= Artistic swimming at the European Games =

Sport

Artistic swimming has been contested twice at the European Games. At the 2015 Games, the sport was officially known by its old name as synchronised swimming.

== Editions ==
Games	Year	Events	Best Nation
I	2015	4	Russia
II	Not contested		
III	2023	8	Spain

== Venues ==
Games	Venue	Other sports hosted at venue	Capacity	Notes
2015 Baku	Aquatic Palace	Swimming and diving	6,000	New arena
2023 Kraków-Małopolska	Oświęcim Aquatics Centre	–	400	

== Events ==
Event	15	23	Years
Recurve
Women's solo	X		1
Women's duet	X		1
Women's duet technical		X	1
Women's duet free		X	1
Mixed duet technical		X	1
Mixed duet free		X	1
Women's team	X		1
Open team technical		X	1
Open team free		X	1
Women's combination	X		1
Open combination		X	1
Open acrobatic		X	1
Total	4	8	

== Medal table ==
Rank	Nation	Gold	Silver	Bronze	Total
1	Russia (RUS)	4	0	0	4
2	Spain (ESP)	3	4	0	7
3	Austria (AUT)	2	1	1	4
4	Italy (ITA)	1	3	1	5
5	France (FRA)	1	0	1	2
5	Israel (ISR)	1	0	1	2
7	Ukraine (UKR)	0	2	3	5
8	Germany (GER)	0	1	0	1
8	Netherlands (NED)	0	1	0	1
10	Great Britain (GBR)	0	0	3	3
11	Greece (GRE)	0	0	1	1
11	Turkey (TUR)	0	0	1	1
Totals (12 entries)		12	12	12	36

== Medallists ==
=== Women's solo ===
Games	Gold	Silver	Bronze
2015 Baku	Anisiya Neborako; Russia	Berta Ferreras; Spain	Anna-Maria Alexandri; Austria

=== Women's duet ===
==== Women's technical and free routines combined ====
Games	Gold	Silver	Bronze
2015 Baku	Russia; Valeriya Filenkova; Daria Kulagina	Austria; Anna-Maria Alexandri; Eirini-Marina Alexandri	Ukraine; Yana Nariezhna; Yelyzaveta Yakhno

==== Women's technical routine ====
Games	Gold	Silver	Bronze
2023 Oświęcim	Austria; Anna-Maria Alexandri; Eirini-Marina Alexandri	Netherlands; Bregje de Brouwer; Marloes Steenbeek	Greece; Sofia Malkogeorgou; Evangelia Platanioti

==== Women's free routine ====
Games	Gold	Silver	Bronze
2023 Oświęcim	Austria; Anna-Maria Alexandri; Eirini-Marina Alexandri	Ukraine; Maryna Aleksiyiva; Vladyslava Aleksiyiva	Great Britain; Kate Shortman; Isabelle Thorpe

=== Mixed duet ===
==== Mixed technical routine ====
Games	Gold	Silver	Bronze
2023 Oświęcim	Italy; Giorgio Minisini; Lucrezia Ruggiero	Spain; Emma García; Dennis González	Great Britain; Beatrice Crass; Ranjuo Tomblin

==== Mixed free routine ====
Games	Gold	Silver	Bronze
2023 Oświęcim	Spain; Mireia Hernández; Dennis González	Italy; Giorgio Minisini; Lucrezia Ruggiero	Great Britain; Beatrice Crass; Ranjuo Tomblin

=== Team ===
==== Women's technical and free routines combined ====
Games	Gold	Silver	Bronze
2015 Baku	Russia; Valeriya Filenkova; Mayya Gurbanberdieva; Veronika Kalinina; Daria Kulagina; Anna Larkina; Anisiya Neborako; ~~Mariia Nemchinova~~; Maria Salmina; Anastasiia Arkhipovskaia; Elizaveta Ovchinnikova	Spain; Julia Echeberría; Berta Ferreras; Helena Jaumà; María del Carmen Juárez; Emilia Luboslavova; Raquel Navarro; Itzíar Sánchez; Irene Toledano; Sara Saldaña; Lidia Vigara	Ukraine; Valeriia Aprielieva; Valeriya Berezhna; Veronika Gryshko; Yana Nariezhna; Alina Shynkarenko; Kateryna Tkachova; Yelyzaveta Yakhno; Anna Yesipova

==== Open technical routine ====
Games	Gold	Silver	Bronze
2023 Oświęcim	Spain; Cristina Arambula; Marina García; Meritxell Mas; Alisa Ozhogina; Paula Ramírez; Sara Saldaña; Iris Tió; Blanca Toledano	Italy; Linda Cerruti; Marta Iacoacci; Sofia Mastroianni; Enrica Piccoli; Lucrezia Ruggiero; Isotta Sportelli; Giulia Vernice; Francesca Zunino	France; Laelys Alavez; Anastasia Bayandina; Ambre Esnault; Mayssa Guermoud; Romane Lunel; Eve Planeix; Charlotte Tremble; Laura Tremble

==== Open free routine ====
Games	Gold	Silver	Bronze
2023 Oświęcim	Spain; Cristina Arambula; Marina García; Meritxell Mas; Alisa Ozhogina; Paula Ramírez; Sara Saldaña; Iris Tió; Berta Ferreras	Italy; Linda Cerruti; Marta Iacoacci; Sofia Mastroianni; Enrica Piccoli; Lucrezia Ruggiero; Isotta Sportelli; Giorgio Minisini; Francesca Zunino	Israel; Shelly Bobritsky; Maya Dorf; Noy Gazala; Catherine Kunin; Aya Mazor; Nikol Nahshonov; Ariel Nassee; Neta Rubichek

=== Combination ===
==== Women's combination ====
Games	Gold	Silver	Bronze
2015 Baku	Russia; Anastasia Arkhipovskaya; Valeriya Filenkova; Mayya Gurbanberdieva; Veronika Kalinina; Daria Kulagina; Anna Larkina; Anisiya Neborako; ~~Mariia Nemchinova~~; Elizaveta Ovchinnikova; Maria Salmina	Spain; Julia Echeberría; Berta Ferreras; Helena Jaumà; María del Carmen Juárez; Emilia Luboslavova; Raquel Navarro; Itzíar Sánchez; Irene Toledano; Sara Saldaña; Lidia Vigara	Ukraine; Valeriia Aprielieva; Valeriya Berezhna; Veronika Gryshko; Yana Nariezhna; Alina Shynkarenko; Kateryna Tkachova; Yelyzaveta Yakhno; Anna Yesipova

==== Open free combination ====
Games	Gold	Silver	Bronze
2023 Oświęcim	Israel; Eden Blecher; Shelly Bobritsky; Maya Dorf; Noy Gazala; Catherine Kunin; Aya Mazor; Nikol Nahshonov; Ariel Nassee; Neta Rubichek; Shani Sharaizin	Germany; Klara Bleyer; Amelie Blumenthal Haz; Marlene Bojer; Maria Denisov; Solene Guisard; Daria Martens; Susana Rovner; Frithjof Seidel; Daria Tonn; Michelle Zimmer	Turkey; Derin Aralp; Duru Kanberoğlu; Ayda Salepçioğlu; Ece Sokullu; Nil Talu; Selin Telci; Ece Üngör; Dila Yildiz; Esmanur Yirmibeş; İsra Yüksel

=== Acrobatic ===
==== Open acrobatic ====
Games	Gold	Silver	Bronze
2023 Oświęcim	France; Anastasia Bayandina; Ambre Esnault; Mayssa Guermoud; Claudia Janvier; Romane Lunel; Eve Planeix; Charlotte Tremble; Laura Tremble	Ukraine; Maryna Aleksiiva; Vladyslava Aleksiiva; Marta Fiedina; Veronika Hryshko; Daria Moshynska; Anhelina Ovchynnikova; Anastasiia Shmonina; Valeriya Tyshchenko	Italy; Linda Cerruti; Marta Iacoacci; Sofia Mastroianni; Giorgio Minisini; Enrica Piccoli; Carmen Rocchino; Isotta Sportelli; Francesca Zunino

== Participating nations ==
Nation	15	23	Years
Austria	9	2	2
Azerbaijan	2		1
Belgium		2	1
Belarus	10		1
Bulgaria	2	4	2
Czech Republic	2	2	2
Denmark		2	1
Estonia		2	1
France	10	14	2
Georgia		2	1
Germany	1	10	2
Great Britain	10	12	2
Greece	10	11	2
Hungary	8	12	2
Israel	2	11	2
Italy	10	10	2
Liechtenstein	2	3	2
Netherlands	10	3	2
Poland	2	2	2
Portugal		12	1
Russia	10		1
Serbia		3	1
Slovakia	10	2	2
Slovenia		2	1
Spain	10	13	2
Switzerland	10	9	2
Turkey	10	12	2
Ukraine	10	11	2
No. of nations	21	25	
No. of archers	150	168	
Year	15	23	
