= Artistic swimming at the 2019 World Aquatics Championships =

- Host city: Gwangju, South Korea
- Date(s): 12–20 July
- Venue(s): Yeomju Gymnasium
- Nations participating: 47
- Athletes participating: 384
- Events: 10

Artistic swimming (formally synchronized swimming) at the 2019 World Aquatics Championships was held between 12 and 20 July 2019.

== Schedule ==
Ten events were held.

All time are local (UTC+9).

Date	Time	Round
12 July 2019	11:00	Solo technical routine preliminaries
12 July 2019	16:00	Duet technical routine preliminaries
13 July 2019	11:00	Mixed duet technical routine preliminaries
13 July 2019	19:00	Solo technical routine final
14 July 2019	11:00	Team technical routine preliminaries
14 July 2019	19:00	Duet technical routine final
15 July 2019	11:00	Solo free routine preliminaries
15 July 2019	17:00	Mixed duet technical routine final
15 July 2019	19:00	Highlight routine final
16 July 2019	11:00	Duet free routine preliminaries
16 July 2019	19:00	Team technical routine final
17 July 2019	11:00	Team free routine preliminaries
17 July 2019	19:00	Solo free routine final
18 July 2019	11:00	Free combination preliminaries
18 July 2019	19:00	Duet free routine final
19 July 2019	11:00	Mixed duet free routine preliminaries
19 July 2019	19:00	Team free routine final
20 July 2019	17:00	Mixed duet free routine final
20 July 2019	19:00	Free combination final

== Medal summary ==
=== Medal table ===
Rank	Nation	Gold	Silver	Bronze	Total
1	Russia	9	0	0	9
2	Ukraine	1	0	5	6
3	China	0	5	0	5
4	Italy	0	3	0	3
5	Spain	0	2	1	3
6	Japan	0	0	4	4
Totals (6 entries)		10	10	10	30

=== Medal events ===
Event	Gold		Silver		Bronze	
Solo Technical Routine	Svetlana Kolesnichenko; Russia	95.0023	Ona Carbonell; Spain	92.5002	Yukiko Inui; Japan	92.3084
Solo Free Routine	Svetlana Romashina; Russia	97.1333	Ona Carbonell; Spain	94.5667	Yukiko Inui; Japan	93.2000
Duet Technical Routine	Russia; Svetlana Kolesnichenko; Svetlana Romashina	95.9010	China; Huang Xuechen; Sun Wenyan	94.0072	Ukraine; Marta Fiedina; Anastasiya Savchuk	92.5847
Duet Free Routine	Russia; Svetlana Kolesnichenko; Svetlana Romashina	97.5000	China; Huang Xuechen; Sun Wenyan	95.7667	Ukraine; Marta Fiedina; Anastasiya Savchuk	94.1000
Team Technical Routine	Russia; Anastasia Arkhipovskaya; Vlada Chigireva; Mayya Doroshko; Marina Goliadkina; Veronika Kalinina; Polina Komar; Alla Shishkina; Maria Shurochkina	96.9426	China; Feng Yu; Guo Li; Huang Xuechen; Liang Xinping; Sun Wenyan; Wang Qianyi; Xiao Yanning; Yin Chengxin	95.1543	Ukraine; Maryna Aleksiiva; Vladyslava Aleksiiva; Marta Fiedina; Yana Nariezhna; Kateryna Reznik; Anastasiya Savchuk; Alina Shynkarenko; Yelyzaveta Yakhno	93.4514
Team Free Routine	Russia; Anastasia Arkhipovskaya; Vlada Chigireva; Marina Goliadkina; Veronika Kalinina; Polina Komar; Alla Shishkina; Maria Shurochkina; Varvara Subbotina	98.0000	China; Chang Hao; Feng Yu; Guo Li; Huang Xuechen; Liang Xinping; Sun Wenyan; Xiao Yanning; Yin Chengxin	96.0333	Ukraine; Maryna Aleksiiva; Vladyslava Aleksiiva; Marta Fiedina; Yana Nariezhna; Kateryna Reznik; Anastasiya Savchuk; Alina Shynkarenko; Yelyzaveta Yakhno	94.3667
Highlight Routine	Ukraine; Maryna Aleksiiva; Vladyslava Aleksiiva; Valeriia Aprielieva; Veronika Hryshko; Oleksandra Kovalenko; Yana Nariezhna; Kateryna Reznik; Anastasiya Savchuk; Alina Shynkarenko; Yelyzaveta Yakhno	94.5000	Italy; Beatrice Callegari; Domiziana Cavanna; Linda Cerruti; Francesca Deidda; Costanza Di Camillo; Costanza Ferro; Gemma Galli; Alessia Pezone; Enrica Piccoli; Federica Sala	91.7333	Spain; Leyre Abadía; Ona Carbonell; Abril Conesa; Berta Ferreras; Cecilia Jiménez; María Juárez; Meritxell Mas; Elena Melián; Paula Ramírez; Blanca Toledano	91.1333
Free Routine Combination	Russia; Anastasia Arkhipovskaya; Vlada Chigireva; Mayya Doroshko; Marina Goliadkina; Mikhaela Kalancha; Veronika Kalinina; Polina Komar; Alla Shishkina; Maria Shurochkina; Varvara Subbotina	98.0000	China; Chang Hao; Cheng Wentao; Feng Yu; Guo Li; Liang Xinping; Sun Wenyan; Tang Mengni; Wang Qianyi; Xiao Yanning; Yin Chengxin	96.5667	Ukraine; Maryna Aleksiiva; Vladyslava Aleksiiva; Valeriia Aprielieva; Veronika Hryshko; Oleksandra Kovalenko; Yana Nariezhna; Kateryna Reznik; Anastasiya Savchuk; Alina Shynkarenko; Yelyzaveta Yakhno	94.5333
Mixed Duet Technical Routine	Russia; Mayya Gurbanberdieva; Aleksandr Maltsev	92.0749	Italy; Manila Flamini; Giorgio Minisini	90.8511	Japan; Atsushi Abe; Yumi Adachi	88.5113
Mixed Duet Free Routine	Russia; Mayya Gurbanberdieva; Aleksandr Maltsev	92.9667	Italy; Manila Flamini; Giorgio Minisini	91.8333	Japan; Atsushi Abe; Yumi Adachi	90.4000
