= Ukraine at the 2018 European Championships =

- IOC code: UKR

in (United Kingdom) Glasgow (Germany) Berlin 2 August 2018 – 12 August 2018
- Competitors: 175 in 6 sports
- Medals Ranked 8th: Gold 8 Silver 13 Bronze 5 Total 26

European Championships appearances
- 2018; 2022

Ukraine competed at the inaugural 7 sports 2018 European Championships from 2 to 12 August 2018. It competed in 6 sports.

== Medallists ==
Medal	Name	Sport	Event	Date
Gold	Mykhailo Romanchuk	Swimming	Men's 400 metre freestyle	3 August
Gold	Roman Gladysh	Cycling	Men's scratch	3 August
Gold	Maryna Aleksiiva; Vladyslava Aleksiiva; Valeria Aprielieva; Marta Fiedina; Oleksandra Kashuba; Yana Nariezhna; Kateryna Reznik; Anastasiya Savchuk; Alina Shynkarenko; Yelyzaveta Yakhno; Veronika Hryshko; Oleksandra Kovalenko	Synchronised swimming	Combination routine	5 August
Gold	Oleg Kolodiy; Sofiia Lyskun	Diving	Mixed team	6 August
Gold	Maryan Zakalnytskyy	Athletics	Men's 50 kilometres walk	7 August
Gold	Andriy Govorov	Swimming	Men's 50 metre butterfly	7 August
Gold	Mykhailo Romanchuk	Swimming	Men's 800 metre freestyle	8 August
Gold	Nataliya Pryshchepa	Athletics	Women's 800 metres	10 August
Silver	Anastasiya Savchuk; Yelyzaveta Yakhno	Synchronised swimming	Duet technical routine	3 August
Silver	Liubov Basova; Olena Starikova	Cycling	Women's team sprint	3 August
Silver	Olena Buryak; Yevheniya Dovhodko; Anastasiya Kozhenkova; Daryna Verkhohliad	Rowing	Women's quadruple sculls	4 August
Silver	Maryna Aleksiiva; Valeria Aprielieva; Oleksandra Kashuba; Yana Nariezhna; Kateryna Reznik; Anastasiya Savchuk; Alina Shynkarenko; Yelyzaveta Yakhno; Veronika Hryshko; Oleksandra Kovalenko	Synchronised swimming	Team free routine	4 August
Silver	Mykhailo Romanchuk	Swimming	Men's 1500 metre freestyle	5 August
Silver	Yelyzaveta Yakhno	Synchronised swimming	Solo technical routine	6 August
Silver	Maryna Aleksiiva; Valeria Aprielieva; Oleksandra Kashuba; Yana Nariezhna; Vladyslava Aleksiiva; Anastasiya Savchuk; Alina Shynkarenko; Yelyzaveta Yakhno; Veronika Hryshko; Oleksandra Kovalenko	Synchronised swimming	Team free routine	6 August
Silver	Olena Starikova	Cycling	Women's 500 m time trial	6 August
Silver	Anastasiya Savchuk; Yelyzaveta Yakhno	Synchronised swimming	Duet free routine	7 August
Silver	Alina Tsviliy	Athletics	Women's 50 kilometres walk	7 August
Silver	Anna Ryzhykova	Athletics	Women's 400 metres hurdles	10 August
Silver	Maryna Bekh	Athletics	Women's long jump	11 August
Silver	Igor Radivilov	Gymnastics	Men's vault	12 August
Bronze	Diana Dymchenko	Rowing	Women's single sculls	5 August
Bronze	Yelyzaveta Yakhno	Synchronised swimming	Solo free routine	7 August
Bronze	Viktoriya Kesar; Stanislav Oliferchyk	Diving	Mixed 3 m springboard synchro	8 August
Bronze	Serhiy Nykyforov	Athletics	Men's long jump	8 August
Bronze	Olha Lyakhova	Athletics	Women's 800 metres	10 August
