= Ukraine at the 2019 World Aquatics Championships =

- Flag of Ukraine
- World Aquatics code: UKR
- National federation: Ukrainian Swimming Federation
- Website: usf.org.ua (in Ukrainian)

in Gwangju, South Korea
- Medals Ranked 14th: Gold 1 Silver 1 Bronze 5 Total 7

World Aquatics Championships appearances
- 1994; 1998; 2001; 2003; 2005; 2007; 2009; 2011; 2013; 2015; 2017; 2019; 2022; 2023; 2024; 2025

Other related appearances
- Soviet Union (1973–1991)

Ukraine competed at the 2019 World Aquatics Championships in Gwangju, South Korea from 12 to 28 July.

== Medalists ==
Medal	Name	Sport	Event	Date
Gold	Maryna Aleksiiva; Vladyslava Aleksiiva; Valeriia Aprielieva; Veronika Hryshko; Oleksandra Kovalenko; Yana Nariezhna; Kateryna Reznik; Anastasiya Savchuk; Alina Shynkarenko; Yelyzaveta Yakhno	Artistic swimming	Highlight routine	15 July
Silver	Mykhailo Romanchuk	Swimming	Men's 1500 metre freestyle	28 July
Bronze	Marta Fiedina; Anastasiya Savchuk	Artistic swimming	Duet technical routine	14 July
Bronze	Maryna Aleksiiva; Vladyslava Aleksiiva; Marta Fiedina; Yana Nariezhna; Kateryna Reznik; Anastasiya Savchuk; Alina Shynkarenko; Yelyzaveta Yakhno	Artistic swimming	Team technical routine	16 July
Bronze	Marta Fiedina; Anastasiya Savchuk	Artistic swimming	Duet free routine	18 July
Bronze	Maryna Aleksiiva; Vladyslava Aleksiiva; Marta Fiedina; Yana Nariezhna; Kateryna Reznik; Anastasiya Savchuk; Alina Shynkarenko; Yelyzaveta Yakhno	Artistic swimming	Team free routine	19 July
Bronze	Maryna Aleksiiva; Vladyslava Aleksiiva; Valeriia Aprielieva; Veronika Hryshko; Oleksandra Kovalenko; Yana Nariezhna; Kateryna Reznik; Anastasiya Savchuk; Alina Shynkarenko; Yelyzaveta Yakhno	Artistic swimming	Free routine combination	20 July

== Artistic swimming ==
Ukraine entered 12 artistic swimmers.

Women

Athlete	Event	Preliminaries		Final	
Athlete	Event	Points	Rank	Points	Rank
Marta Fiedina	Solo technical routine	90.6797	4 Q	91.3014	4
Marta Fiedina	Solo free routine	92.0667	4 Q	92.5667	4
Marta Fiedina; Anastasiya Savchuk; Yelyzaveta Yakhno (R)	Duet technical routine	92.0610	3 Q	92.5847	3rd place, bronze medalist(s)
Marta Fiedina; Anastasiya Savchuk; Yelyzaveta Yakhno (R)	Duet free routine	93.1333	3 Q	94.1000	3rd place, bronze medalist(s)
Maryna Aleksiiva; Vladyslava Aleksiiva; Marta Fiedina; Yana Nariezhna; Kateryna Reznik; Anastasiya Savchuk; Alina Shynkarenko; Yelyzaveta Yakhno; Veronika Hryshko (R); Oleksandra Kovalenko (R)	Team technical routine	93.3313	3 Q	93.4514	3rd place, bronze medalist(s)
Maryna Aleksiiva; Vladyslava Aleksiiva; Marta Fiedina; Yana Nariezhna; Kateryna Reznik; Anastasiya Savchuk; Alina Shynkarenko; Yelyzaveta Yakhno; Veronika Hryshko (R); Oleksandra Kovalenko (R)	Team free routine	93.9667	3 Q	94.3667	3rd place, bronze medalist(s)
Maryna Aleksiiva; Vladyslava Aleksiiva; Valeriia Aprielieva; Veronika Hryshko; Oleksandra Kovalenko; Yana Nariezhna; Kateryna Reznik; Anastasiya Savchuk; Alina Shynkarenko; Yelyzaveta Yakhno; Marta Fiedina (R); Daria Kornieieva (R)	Highlight routine	—N/a		94.5000	1st place, gold medalist(s)
Maryna Aleksiiva; Vladyslava Aleksiiva; Valeriia Aprielieva; Veronika Hryshko; Oleksandra Kovalenko; Yana Nariezhna; Kateryna Reznik; Anastasiya Savchuk; Alina Shynkarenko; Yelyzaveta Yakhno; Marta Fiedina (R); Daria Kornieieva (R)	Free routine combination	94.3333	3 Q	94.5333	3rd place, bronze medalist(s)

Legend: (R) = Reserve Athlete

== Diving ==
Ukraine entered 9 divers.

Men

Athlete	Event	Preliminaries		Semifinals		Final	
Athlete	Event	Points	Rank	Points	Rank	Points	Rank
Oleh Kolodiy	1 m springboard	370.40	5 Q	—N/a		396.40	7
Oleh Kolodiy	3 m springboard	402.75	16 Q	438.60	10 Q	421.40	12
Stanislav Oliferchyk	1 m springboard	274.05	35	—N/a		Did not advance	
Stanislav Oliferchyk	3 m springboard	346.30	37	Did not advance			
Oleh Serbin	10 m platform	339.10	26	Did not advance			
Oleksii Sereda	10 m platform	446.95	8 Q	476.30	7 Q	490.50	4
Oleksandr Horshkovozov; Oleh Kolodiy	3 m synchronized springboard	378.03	3 Q	—N/a		393.24	6
Oleh Serbin; Oleksii Sereda	10 m synchronized platform	339.21	11 Q	—N/a		412.62	4

Women

Athlete	Event	Preliminaries		Semifinals		Final	
Athlete	Event	Points	Rank	Points	Rank	Points	Rank
Anna Arnautova	1 m springboard	210.70	24	—N/a		Did not advance	
Olena Fedorova	1 m springboard	215.65	20	—N/a		Did not advance	
Olena Fedorova	3 m springboard	288.00	11 Q	279.10	15	Did not advance	
Viktoriya Kesar	3 m springboard	258.60	18 Q	300.25	9 Q	276.45	11
Viktoriya Kesar; Hanna Pysmenska	3 m synchronized springboard	249.03	15	—N/a		Did not advance	

Mixed

Athlete	Event	Final	
Athlete	Event	Points	Rank
Stanislav Oliferchyk; Viktoriya Kesar	3 m synchronized springboard	282.84	7
Oleksii Sereda; Anna Arnautova	Team	323.20	9

== High diving ==
Ukraine qualified two male and one female high divers.

Men

Athlete	Event	Points	Rank
Viacheslav Kolesnikov	Men's high diving	358.10	8
Oleksiy Pryhorov	Men's high diving	233.40	15

Women

Athlete	Event	Points	Rank
Antonina Vyshyvanova	Women's high diving	257.65	5

== Open water swimming ==
Ukraine qualified one male and one female open water swimmers.

Men

Athlete	Event	Time	Rank
Ihor Chervynskyy	Men's 10 km	1:52:45.2	52

Women

Athlete	Event	Time	Rank
Krystyna Panchishko	Women's 5 km	59:44.0	29
Krystyna Panchishko	Women's 10 km	2:00:28.6	36

== Swimming ==
Ukraine entered six swimmers.

Men

Athlete	Event	Heat		Semifinal		Final	
Athlete	Event	Time	Rank	Time	Rank	Time	Rank
Serhiy Frolov	800 m freestyle	7:47.25	7 Q	—N/a		7:47.32	7
Serhiy Frolov	1500 m freestyle	14:55.06	8 Q	—N/a		15:01.04	7
Andriy Govorov	50 m freestyle	22.57	37	Did not advance			
Andriy Govorov	50 m butterfly	22.84	=1 Q	22.80	3 Q	22.91	6
Denys Kesil	100 m butterfly	53.39	28	Did not advance			
Denys Kesil	200 m butterfly	1:55.82	3 Q	1:55.95	7 Q	1:54.79 NR	5
Denys Kesil	400 m individual medley	4:24.99	24	—N/a		Did not advance	
Mykyta Koptyelov	100 m breaststroke	1:03.47	56	Did not advance			
Mykyta Koptyelov	200 m breaststroke	2:09.94	15 Q	2:09.96	15	Did not advance	
Mykhailo Romanchuk	800 m freestyle	7:47.01	6 Q	—N/a		7:49.32	8
Mykhailo Romanchuk	1500 m freestyle	14:47.54	3 Q	—N/a		14:37.63	2nd place, silver medalist(s)
Serhiy Shevtsov	100 m freestyle	48.87	=19	Did not advance			
Serhiy Shevtsov	50 m butterfly	23.87	27	Did not advance			
