= Artistic swimming at the 2019 World Aquatics Championships – Team free routine =

Team free routine at the 2019 World Aquatics Championships
- Venue: Yeomju Gymnasium
- Location: Gwangju, South Korea
- Dates: 17, 19 July
- Competitors: 216 from 27 nations
- Teams: 27
- Winning points: 98.0000

Medalists
gold medal	Anastasia Arkhipovskaya; Vlada Chigireva; Marina Goliadkina; Veronika Kalinina; Polina Komar; Alla Shishkina; Maria Shurochkina; Varvara Subbotina	Russia
silver medal	Chang Hao; Feng Yu; Guo Li; Huang Xuechen; Liang Xinping; Sun Wenyan; Xiao Yanning; Yin Chengxin	China
bronze medal	Maryna Aleksiiva; Vladyslava Aleksiiva; Marta Fiedina; Yana Nariezhna; Kateryna Reznik; Anastasiya Savchuk; Alina Shynkarenko; Yelyzaveta Yakhno	Ukraine

The Team free routine competition at the 2019 World Aquatics Championships was held on 17 and 19 July 2019.

== Results ==
The preliminary round was started on 17 July at 11:00. The final was started on 19 July at 19:00.

Green denotes finalists

Rank	Nation	Preliminary		Final	
Rank	Nation	Points	Rank	Points	Rank
1st place, gold medalist(s)	Russia	97.7667	1	98.0000	1
2nd place, silver medalist(s)	China	95.7667	2	96.0333	2
3rd place, bronze medalist(s)	Ukraine	93.9667	3	94.3667	3
4	Japan	92.6667	4	93.3667	4
5	Italy	91.2667	6	91.6000	5
6	Spain	91.3333	5	91.4000	6
7	Canada	90.2000	7	90.1000	7
8	Greece	87.8000	8	88.3333	8
9	France	87.3000	9	87.4667	9
10	Mexico	86.3333	10	87.0333	10
11	United States	85.2667	11	84.4000	11
12	Israel	82.9333	12	83.2667	12
13	Belarus	82.5667	13	did not advance	
14	Switzerland	81.5667	14	did not advance	
15	Kazakhstan	80.5667	15	did not advance	
16	Brazil	80.0667	16	did not advance	
17	Egypt	77.8333	17	did not advance	
18	South Korea	77.1667	18	did not advance	
19	Hungary	76.8667	19	did not advance	
20	Singapore	76.3333	20	did not advance	
21	Slovakia	75.3333	21	did not advance	
22	Australia	74.5333	22	did not advance	
23	Poland	73.7000	23	did not advance	
24	New Zealand	70.1667	24	did not advance	
25	Hong Kong	68.7667	25	did not advance	
26	South Africa	67.1333	26	did not advance	
27	Thailand	65.5000	27	did not advance	
