= Artistic swimming at the 2019 World Aquatics Championships – Team technical routine =

Team technical routine at the 2019 World Aquatics Championships
- Venue: Yeomju Gymnasium
- Location: Gwangju, South Korea
- Dates: 14–16 July
- Competitors: 184 from 23 nations
- Teams: 23
- Winning points: 96.9426

Medalists
gold medal	Anastasia Arkhipovskaya; Vlada Chigireva; Mayya Doroshko; Marina Goliadkina; Veronika Kalinina; Polina Komar; Alla Shishkina; Maria Shurochkina	Russia
silver medal	Feng Yu; Guo Li; Huang Xuechen; Liang Xinping; Sun Wenyan; Wang Qianyi; Xiao Yanning; Yin Chengxin	China
bronze medal	Maryna Aleksiiva; Vladyslava Aleksiiva; Marta Fiedina; Yana Nariezhna; Kateryna Reznik; Anastasiya Savchuk; Alina Shynkarenko; Yelyzaveta Yakhno	Ukraine

The Team technical routine competition at the 2019 World Aquatics Championships was held on 14 and 16 July 2019.

== Results ==
The preliminary round was started on 14 July at 11:00. The final was held on 16 July at 19:00.

Green denotes finalists

Rank	Nation	Preliminary		Final	
Rank	Nation	Points	Rank	Points	Rank
1st place, gold medalist(s)	Russia	96.2253	1	96.9426	1
2nd place, silver medalist(s)	China	94.3638	2	95.1543	2
3rd place, bronze medalist(s)	Ukraine	93.3313	3	93.4514	3
4	Japan	92.3274	4	92.7207	4
5	Italy	90.1049	5	91.0411	5
6	Spain	89.4561	6	90.2506	6
7	Canada	88.4953	7	89.4990	7
8	Greece	86.0075	8	87.0863	8
9	France	85.5793	9	86.6543	9
10	Mexico	85.4235	10	85.6618	10
11	United States	84.4057	11	84.0566	11
12	Israel	81.9659	12	82.5039	12
13	Switzerland	81.7065	13	did not advance	
14	Belarus	81.5990	14	did not advance	
15	Brazil	80.6196	15	did not advance	
16	Egypt	76.8351	16	did not advance	
17	South Korea	76.4096	17	did not advance	
18	Hungary	75.6005	18	did not advance	
19	Singapore	75.0587	19	did not advance	
20	Australia	73.4450	20	did not advance	
21	Poland	72.7496	21	did not advance	
22	New Zealand	66.4279	22	did not advance	
23	Costa Rica	65.5853	23	did not advance	
