= Artistic swimming at the 2019 World Aquatics Championships – Highlight routine =

Highlight routine at the 2019 World Aquatics Championships
- Venue: Yeomju Gymnasium
- Location: Gwangju, South Korea
- Dates: 15 July
- Competitors: 80 from 8 nations
- Teams: 8
- Winning points: 94.5000

Medalists
| gold medal | Maryna Aleksiiva; Vladyslava Aleksiiva; Valeriia Aprielieva; Veronika Hryshko; Oleksandra Kovalenko; Yana Nariezhna; Kateryna Reznik; Anastasiya Savchuk; Alina Shynkarenko; Yelyzaveta Yakhno | Ukraine |
| silver medal | Beatrice Callegari; Domiziana Cavanna; Linda Cerruti; Francesca Deidda; Costanza Di Camillo; Costanza Ferro; Gemma Galli; Alessia Pezone; Enrica Piccoli; Federica Sala | Italy |
| bronze medal | Leyre Abadía; Ona Carbonell; Abril Conesa; Berta Ferreras; Cecilia Jiménez; María Juárez; Meritxell Mas; Elena Melián; Paula Ramírez; Blanca Toledano | Spain |

The Highlight routine competition at the 2019 World Aquatics Championships was held on 15 July 2019.

== Results ==
The final was started at 19:00.

| Rank | Nation | Points |
|---|---|---|
| 1st place, gold medalist(s) | Ukraine | 94.5000 |
| 2nd place, silver medalist(s) | Italy | 91.7333 |
| 3rd place, bronze medalist(s) | Spain | 91.1333 |
| 4 | Canada | 89.9333 |
| 5 | France | 87.2000 |
| 6 | Israel | 83.7000 |
| 7 | Hungary | 77.5667 |
| 8 | Thailand | 71.1333 |
