= Artistic swimming at the 2019 World Aquatics Championships – Free routine combination =

Free routine combination at the 2019 World Aquatics Championships
- Venue: Yeomju Gymnasium
- Location: Gwangju, South Korea
- Dates: 18–20 July
- Competitors: 150 from 15 nations
- Teams: 15
- Winning points: 98.0000

Medalists
gold medal	Anastasia Arkhipovskaya; Vlada Chigireva; Mayya Doroshko; Marina Goliadkina; Mikhaela Kalancha; Veronika Kalinina; Polina Komar; Alla Shishkina; Maria Shurochkina; Varvara Subbotina	Russia
silver medal	Chang Hao; Cheng Wentao; Feng Yu; Guo Li; Liang Xinping; Sun Wenyan; Tang Mengni; Wang Qianyi; Xiao Yanning; Yin Chengxin	China
bronze medal	Maryna Aleksiiva; Vladyslava Aleksiiva; Valeriia Aprielieva; Veronika Hryshko; Oleksandra Kovalenko; Yana Nariezhna; Kateryna Reznik; Anastasiya Savchuk; Alina Shynkarenko; Yelyzaveta Yakhno	Ukraine

The Free routine combination competition at the 2019 World Aquatics Championships was held on 18 and 20 July 2019.

== Results ==
The preliminary round was started on 18 July at 11:00. The final was started on 20 July at 19:00.

Green denotes finalists

Rank	Nation	Preliminary		Final	
Rank	Nation	Points	Rank	Points	Rank
1st place, gold medalist(s)	Russia	96.5667	1	98.0000	1
2nd place, silver medalist(s)	China	96.0000	2	96.5667	2
3rd place, bronze medalist(s)	Ukraine	94.3333	3	94.5333	3
4	Japan	93.0000	4	93.2333	4
5	Italy	90.9000	5	91.4667	5
6	Greece	88.1333	6	87.6000	6
7	Israel	83.6333	7	83.7667	7
8	Brazil	81.6667	9	83.6333	8
9	Belarus	82.8333	8	82.9667	9
10	Kazakhstan	81.6667	9	82.0000	10
11	South Korea	77.7000	11	78.8000	11
12	Hungary	77.4000	12	77.9333	12
13	Slovakia	76.7000	13	did not advance	
14	South Africa	66.7000	14	did not advance	
15	Thailand	66.1333	15	did not advance	
