= Synchronised swimming at the 2018 European Aquatics Championships – Team technical routine =

Team technical routine at the 2018 European Aquatics Championships
- Venue: Scotstoun Sports Campus
- Dates: 6 August
- Competitors: 88 from 11 nations
- Teams: 11
- Winning points: 94.6000

Medalists
| gold medal | Anastasiia Arkhipovskaya; Anastasia Bayandina; Daria Bayandina; Marina Goliadkina; Mikhaela Kalancha; Veronika Kalinina; Polina Komar; Maria Shurochkina; Darina Valitova | Russia |
| silver medal | Maryna Aleksiiva; Vladyslava Aleksiiva; Oleksandra Kashuba; Oleksandra Kovalenko; Yana Nariezhna; Anastasiya Savchuk; Alina Shynkarenko; Yelyzaveta Yakhno; Valeriia Aprielieva; Veronika Hryshko | Ukraine |
| bronze medal | Beatrice Callegari; Domiziana Cavanna; Linda Cerruti; Francesca Deidda; Costanza Di Camillo; Costanza Ferro; Gemma Galli; Enrica Piccoli; Alessia Pezone; Federica Sala | Italy |

The Team technical routine competition of the 2018 European Aquatics Championships was held on 6 August 2018.

== Results ==
The final was started at 13:30.

| Rank | Nation | |
| Rank | Nation | Points |
|---|---|---|
| 1st place, gold medalist(s) | Russia | 94.6000 |
| 2nd place, silver medalist(s) | Ukraine | 90.7439 |
| 3rd place, bronze medalist(s) | Italy | 90.3553 |
| 4 | Spain | 89.8716 |
| 5 | Greece | 85.9359 |
| 6 | France | 85.1023 |
| 7 | Belarus | 83.7633 |
| 8 | Israel | 81.1266 |
| 9 | Great Britain | 77.8708 |
| 10 | Austria | 77.2775 |
| 11 | Turkey | 75.1178 |
| | Portugal | DNS |
