= Ukraine at the 2022 European Championships =

in (Germany) Munich 11 August 2022 – 22 August 2022
- Competitors: 157 in 10 sports
- Medals Ranked 11th: Gold 5 Silver 8 Bronze 9 Total 22

European Championships appearances
- 2018; 2022

Ukraine competed at the 2022 European Championships in Munich from August 11 to August 22, 2022.

== Medallists ==
Medal	Name	Sport	Event	Date
Gold	Svitlana Bohuslavska; Iaroslav Koiuda	Rowing	Mixed PR2 double sculls	14 August
Gold	Danyil Boldyrev	Sport climbing	Men's speed	15 August
Gold	Maryna Bekh-Romanchuk	Athletics	Women's triple jump	19 August
Gold	Liudmyla Luzan; Anastasiia Chetverikova	Canoeing	Women's C-2 500 metres	20 August
Gold	Yaroslava Mahuchikh	Athletics	Women's high jump	21 August
Silver	Roman Polianskyi	Rowing	Men's PR1 single sculls	13 August
Silver	Olena Starikova	Cycling	Women's 500 m time trial	13 August
Silver	Liudmyla Luzan	Canoeing	Women's C-1 500 metres	19 August
Silver	Liudmyla Luzan	Canoeing	Women's C-1 200 metres	21 August
Silver	Vladyslav Yepifanov	Canoeing	Men's VL3 200 metres	19 August
Silver	Viktoriya Tkachuk	Athletics	Women's 400 metres hurdles	19 August
Silver	Mykola Syniuk	Canoeing	Men's KL2 200 metres	21 August
Silver	Illia Kovtun	Men's Artistic Gymnastics	Parallel bars	21 August
Bronze	Anna Sheremet	Rowing	Women's PR1 single sculls	13 August
Bronze	Daryna Verkhogliad; Nataliya Dovhodko; Kateryna Dudchenko; Yevheniya Dovhodko	Rowing	Women's quadruple sculls	13 August
Bronze	Olena Starikova	Cycling	Women's keirin	16 August
Bronze	Andriy Protsenko	Athletics	Men's high jump	18 August
Bronze	Nataliia Lahutenko	Canoeing	Women's VL3 200 metres	19 August
Bronze	Anna Ryzhykova	Athletics	Women's 400 metres hurdles	19 August
Bronze	Igor Radivilov	Men's Artistic Gymnastics	Vault	21 August
Bronze	Liudmyla Babak	Canoeing	Women's Canoe C-1 5000 metres	21 August
Bronze	Maryna Mazhula	Canoeing	Women's KL1 200 metres	21 August

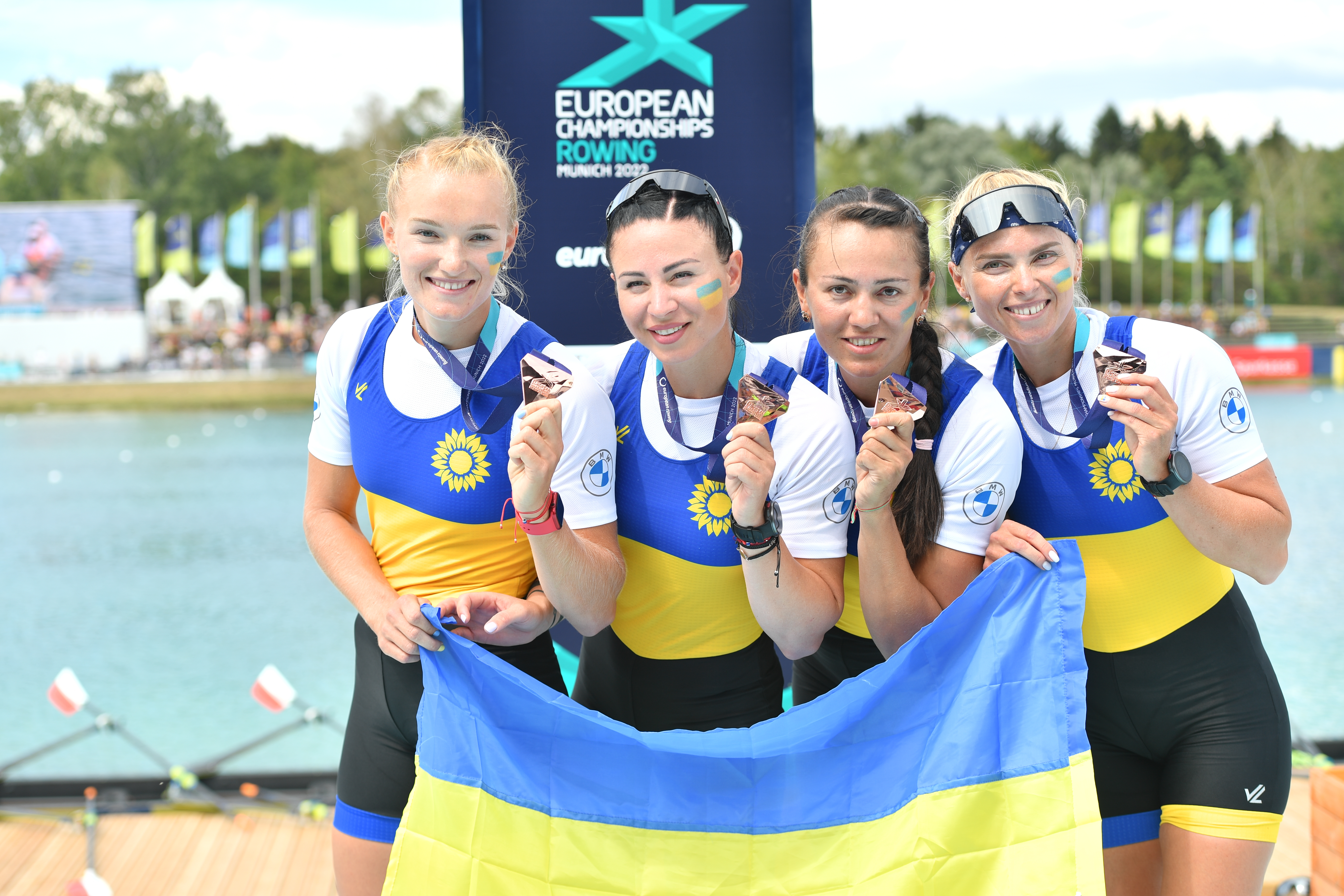
Ukrainian women's team with their bronze medals won in rowing

== Competitors ==
The following is the list of number of competitors in the Championships:

Sport	Men	Women	Total
Athletics	25	28	53
Beach volleyball	0	6	6
Gymnastics (men and women)	5	5	10
Canoe sprint	18	13	31
Cycling mountain bike	1	1	2
Cycling track	5	5	10
Rowing	12	8	20
Sport climbing	5	6	11
Table tennis	4	4	8
Triathlon	2	2	4
Total	81	76	157

== Athletics ==
Ukraine entered the following athletes.

Key

- Q = Qualified for the next round
- q = Qualified for the next round as a fastest loser or, in field events, by position without achieving the qualifying target
- NR = National record
- PB = Personal best
- SB = Season best
- N/A = Round not applicable for the event

=== Men ===
Track and road events

Athlete	Event	Heat		Semifinal		Final	
Athlete	Event	Result	Rank	Result	Rank	Result	Rank
Danylo Danylenko	400 m	46.39 SB	23	Did not advance			
Vitaliy Shafar	Marathon	—N/a				2:22:24	53
Ihor Heletiy	Marathon	—N/a				2:26:33 SB	59
Viktor Shumik	20 km walk	—N/a				1:25:51 SB	15
Ivan Losev	20 km walk	—N/a				1:27:10 SB	18
Serhiy Svitlychniy	20 km walk	—N/a				1:28:51 SB	22
Maryan Zakalnytskyy	35 km walk	—N/a				2:39:06 SB	11
Ivan Banzeruk	35 km walk	—N/a				2:39:34 SB	13
Anton Radko	35 km walk	—N/a				2:43:10 SB	15
Serhiy Smelyk; Stanislav Kovalenko; Kyrylo Prykhodko; Andrii Vasyliev	4 × 100 m relay	39.62 SB	14	—N/a		Did not advance	
Oleksiy Pozdnyakov; Danylo Danylenko; Mykyta Barabanov; Oleksandr Pohorilko	4 × 400 m relay	3:04.15 SB	12	—N/a		Did not advance	

Field events

Athlete	Event	Qualification		Final	
Athlete	Event	Distance	Position	Distance	Position
Andriy Protsenko	High jump	2.21	8 q	2.27	3rd place, bronze medalist(s)
Oleh Doroshchuk	High jump	2.21	10 q	2.23	4
Bohdan Bondarenko	High jump	2.17	14	Did not advance	
Roman Kokoshko	Shot put	19.86	13	Did not advance	
Mykyta Nesterenko	Dscus throw	57.59	23	Did not advance	
Mykhaylo Kokhan	Hammer throw	77.85	3 Q	78.48	5
Mykhailo Havryliuk	Hammer throw	71.14	17	Did not advance	
Artur Felfner	Javelin throw	76.06	15	Did not advance	

=== Women ===
Track and road events

Athlete	Event	Heat		Semifinal		Final	
Athlete	Event	Result	Rank	Result	Rank	Result	Rank
Nataliya Krol	800 m	2:00.89 SB	1 Q	2:01.84	13	Did not advance	
Olha Lyakhova	800 m	2:02.91	13	Did not advance			
Valeriia Zinenko	10,000 m	—N/a				31:55.60 PB	7
Tetyana Hamera	Marathon	—N/a				2:37:28 SB	27
Marina Nemchenko	Marathon	—N/a				2:53:13 SB	51
Yevheniya Prokofyeva	Marathon	—N/a				DNF	
Viktoriia Kaliuzhna	Marathon	—N/a				DNF	
Hanna Plotitsyna	100 m hurdles	13.66	20	Did not advance			
Anna Ryzhykova	400 m hurdles	Bye		54.25 SB	2 Q	54.86	3rd place, bronze medalist(s)
Viktoriya Tkachuk	400 m hurdles	Bye		54.65	4 Q	54.30	2nd place, silver medalist(s)
Nataliya Strebkova	3000 m steeplechase	9:47.35	14 q	—N/a		9:37.52	9
Lyudmyla Olyanovska	20 km walk	—N/a				1:29:46 SB	4
Olena Sobchuk	20 km walk	—N/a				1:32:07	9
Hanna Shevchuk	20 km walk	—N/a				DQ	
Inna Loseva	35 km walk	—N/a				2:57:55 SB	8
Tamara Havrylyuk	35 km walk	—N/a				3:21:01 SB	18

Field events

Athlete	Event	Qualification		Final	
Athlete	Event	Distance	Position	Distance	Position
Iryna Herashchenko	High jump	1.87	5 q	1.93	5
Yaroslava Mahuchikh	High jump	1.87	9 q	1.95	1st place, gold medalist(s)
Yuliya Levchenko	High jump	1.87	13 q	1.86	9
Yana Hladiychuk	Pole vault	4.25	18	Did not advance	
Maryna Kylypko	Pole vault	4.25	22	Did not advance	
Maryna Bekh-Romanchuk	Long jump	6.87 SB	2 Q	6.76	4
Maryna Bekh-Romanchuk	Triple jump	14.36	3 q	15.02 EL	1st place, gold medalist(s)
Iryna Klymets	Hammer throw	67.87	10 q	69.18	6
Hanna Hatsko	Javelin throw	57.39	13	Did not advance	

Combined events – Heptathlon

Athlete	Event	100H	HJ	SP	200 m	LJ	JT	800 m	Final	Rank
Yuliya Loban	Result	14.36	1.74	13.99	25.68	6.00 PB	44.77	2:22.62	5846 SB	12
Yuliya Loban	Points	928	903	793	825	850	759	788	5846 SB	12

== Beach Volleyball ==
Ukraine qualified 3 female pairs.

Athlete	Event	Preliminary round			Round of 24	Round of 16	Quarterfinals	Semifinals	Final / BM	
Athlete	Event	Opposition Score	Opposition Score	Rank	Opposition Score	Opposition Score	Opposition Score	Opposition Score	Opposition Score	Rank
Valentyna Davidova; Diana Lunina	Women's	Böbner – Vergé-Dépré (SUI)								
Anhelina Khmil; Tetiana Lazarenko	Women's	Borger – Sude (GER)								
Inna Makhno; Iryna Makhno	Women's	Heidrich – Vergé-Dépré (SUI)								

== Gymnastics ==
Ukraine entered 5 men and 5 women.

=== Men ===
Qualification

Athlete	Event	Qualification								Final							
Athlete	Event	Apparatus						Total	Rank	Apparatus						Total	Rank
Athlete	Event	F	PH	R	V	PB	HB	Total	Rank	F	PH	R	V	PB	HB	Total	Rank
Nazar Chepurnyi	Team															—N/a	
Illia Kovtun	Team															—N/a	
Mykyta Melnykov	Team															—N/a	
Petro Pakhniuk	Team															—N/a	
Igor Radivilov	Team															—N/a	
Total	Team																

=== Women ===
Qualification

Athlete	Event	Qualification						Final					
Athlete	Event	Apparatus				Total	Rank	Apparatus				Total	Rank
Athlete	Event	V	UB	BB	F	Total	Rank	V	UB	BB	F	Total	Rank
Yelyzaveta Hubareva	Team											—N/a	
Viktoriia Ivanenko	Team											—N/a	
Yuliia Kasianenko	Team											—N/a	
Kateryna Kulinii	Team											—N/a	
Valeriia Osipova	Team											—N/a	
Total	Team												

== Triathlon ==
Athlete	Event	Swim (1.5 km)	Trans 1	Bike (40 km)	Trans 2	Run (10 km)	Total Time	Rank
Vitalii Vorontsov	Men's							
Maryna Kyryk	Women's							

Relay

Athlete	Event	Swim (300 m)	Trans 1	Bike (6.8 km)	Trans 2	Run (2 km)	Total Group Time	Rank
	Mixed relay							
