= Synchronised swimming at the 2015 European Games – Women's team =

Synchronised swimming – Women's team at the 2015 European Games
- Venue: Baku Aquatics Centre
- Date: 12–15 July
- Nations: 14

Medalists
| gold medal | Valeriya Filenkova; Mayya Gurbanberdieva; Veronika Kalinina; Daria Kulagina; Anna Larkina; Anisiya Neborako; Mariia Nemchinova; Maria Salmina; Anastasiia Arkhipovskaia; Elizaveta Ovchinnikova | Russia |
| silver medal | Julia Echeberría; Berta Ferreras; Helena Jaumà; María del Carmen Juárez; Emilia Luboslavova; Raquel Navarro; Itzíar Sánchez; Irene Toledano; Sara Saldaña; Lidia Vigara | Spain |
| bronze medal | Valeriia Aprielieva; Valeriya Berezhna; Veronika Gryshko; Yana Nariezhna; Alina Shynkarenko; Kateryna Tkachova; Yelyzaveta Yakhno; Anna Yesipova | Ukraine |

The Women's team event at the 2015 European Games in Baku was held from 12 to 15 June, at the Baku Aquatics Centre.

Austria couldn't compete in the free routine after three of its swimmers, Vanessa Sahinovic, Luna Pajer and Verena Breit, were injured after being hit by a bus.

== Schedule ==
All times are local (UTC+5).

| Date | Time | Event |
|---|---|---|
| Friday, 12 June 2015 | 15:30 | Free Routine Preliminary |
| Sunday, 14 June 2015 | 09:00 | Figures |
| Monday, 15 June 2015 | 18:00 | Free Routine Final |

== Results ==
- FR — Free Reserve

=== Preliminary ===
| Rank | Team | Free | Figures | Total | Notes |
|---|---|---|---|---|---|
| 1 | Russia (RUS); Valeriya Filenkova; Mayya Gurbanberdieva; Veronika Kalinina; Daria Kulagina; Anna Larkina; Anisiya Neborako; Mariia Nemchinova; Maria Salmina; Anastasiia Arkhipovskaia (FR); Elizaveta Ovchinnikova (FR) | 89.9333 | 78.3659 | 168.2992 | Q |
| 2 | Spain (ESP); Julia Echeberría; Berta Ferreras; Helena Jaumà; María del Carmen Juárez; Emilia Luboslavova; Raquel Navarro; Itzíar Sánchez; Irene Toledano; Sara Saldaña (FR); Lidia Vigara (FR) | 86.1333 | 74.5739 | 160.7072 | Q |
| 3 | Ukraine (UKR); Valeriia Aprielieva; Valeriya Berezhna; Veronika Gryshko; Yana Nariezhna; Alina Shynkarenko; Kateryna Tkachova; Yelyzaveta Yakhno; Anna Yesipova | 87.3000 | 71.1193 | 158.4193 | Q |
| 4 | Italy (ITA); Beatrice Amadei; Maria Antonietta Buccheri; Noemi Carrozza; Veronica Gallo; Laila Huric; Claudia Modaelli; Enrica Piccoli; Ludovica Redaelli; Raffaella Baldi (FR); Elena Sernagiotto (FR) | 84.5333 | 71.8801 | 156.4134 | Q |
| 5 | France (FRA); Carolane Canavese; Alice Carbonnel; Esther Ducrocq; Inesse Guermoud; Solène Lusseau; Estelle Philibert; Abbygaëlle Slonina; Laura Tremble; Camille Egidio (FR); Charlotte Tremble (FR) | 81.8333 | 71.8920 | 153.7253 | Q |
| 6 | Belarus (BLR); Aliaksandra Bichun; Hanna Kulpo; Anastasiya Navasiolava; Hanna Shulhina; Volha Taleiko; Dominika Tsyplakova; Valeryia Valasach; Elmira Wardak; Maria Egorova (FR); Nastassia Shkuleva (FR) | 80.1667 | 72.2341 | 152.4008 | Q |
| 7 | Greece (GRE); Maria Eleni Armaou; Ifigeneia Dipla; Valentina Farantouri; Giana Gkeorgkieva; Sofia Malkogeorgou; Anastasia Taxopoulou; Anna Maria Taxopoulou; Athanasia Tsola; Vasiliki Kofidi (FR); Maria Papadokonstantaki (FR) | 82.2000 | 69.9074 | 152.1074 | Q |
| 8 | Switzerland (SUI); Maxence Bellina; Christine Fluri; Melisande Jaccard; Vivienne Koch; Joelle Peschl; Maria Piffaretti; Pauline Rosselet; Sarina Weibel; Anaïs Bernard (FR); Lara Soto Couceiro (FR) | 78.5000 | 70.5972 | 149.0972 | Q |
| 9 | Netherlands (NED); Bregje de Brouwer; Noortje de Brouwer; Shelby Kasse; Mirthe Kuperus; Eva Meulblok; Lotte Tromp; Jori van den Hoogen; Adriani Vasilakis; Diede Bronkhorst (FR); Laura van Meel (FR) | 76.0000 | 68.5534 | 144.5534 | Q |
| 10 | Great Britain (GBR); Phoebe Bradley-Smith; Jorja Brown; Jodie Cowie; Emma Critchley; Esme Lower; Genevieve Randall; Hannah Randall; Rebecca Richardson; Danielle Cooper (FR); Lara Hockin (FR) | 75.1000 | 68.1716 | 143.2716 | Q |
| 11 | Turkey (TUR); Defne Bakırcı; Öykü Evliya; Mısra Gündeş; Dilay Horasan; Rezzan Eda Tuncay; Ebru Mina Turhan; Selin Ünser; Hande Yıldız; Nurberat Gökmen (FR); Öykü Halis (FR) | 74.8333 | 67.3818 | 142.2151 | Q |
| 12 | Slovakia (SVK); Simona Barutová; Nada Daabousová; Petra Ďurišová; Miroslava Kratinová; Sophia Lobpreisová; Diana Miškechová; Natália Pivarčiová; Rebecca Schererová; Júlia Bachárová (FR); Alexandra Ratajová (FR) | 72.8000 | 65.9097 | 138.7097 | Q |
| 13 | Hungary (HUN); Dorina Dimanopulosz; Adél Fodor; Viktória Harcsa; Lili Kertai; Fanni Kézdi; Sarolta Lukovszky; Alexandra Riemer; Veronka Szabó | 72.0667 | 63.0120 | 135.0787 | |
| | Austria (AUT); Anna-Maria Alexandri; Eirini-Marina Alexandri; Vasiliki-Pagona Alexandri; Raffaela Breit; Verena Breit; Luna Pajer; Edit Pinter; Vanessa Sahinovic; Vanessa Gamauf (FR) | DNS | 49.5682 | 49.5682 | |

=== Final ===
| Rank | Team | Free | Figures | Total |
|---|---|---|---|---|
| 1st place, gold medalist(s) | Russia (RUS); Valeriya Filenkova; Mayya Gurbanberdieva; Veronika Kalinina; Daria Kulagina; Anna Larkina; Anisiya Neborako; Mariia Nemchinova; Maria Salmina; Anastasiia Arkhipovskaia (FR); Elizaveta Ovchinnikova (FR) | 90.7333 | 78.3659 | 169.0992 |
| 2nd place, silver medalist(s) | Spain (ESP); Julia Echeberría; Berta Ferreras; Helena Jaumà; María del Carmen Juárez; Emilia Luboslavova; Raquel Navarro; Itzíar Sánchez; Irene Toledano; Sara Saldaña (FR); Lidia Vigara (FR) | 87.4667 | 74.5739 | 162.0406 |
| 3rd place, bronze medalist(s) | Ukraine (UKR); Valeriia Aprielieva; Valeriya Berezhna; Veronika Gryshko; Yana Nariezhna; Alina Shynkarenko; Kateryna Tkachova; Yelyzaveta Yakhno; Anna Yesipova | 87.9667 | 71.1193 | 159.0860 |
| 4 | Italy (ITA); Beatrice Amadei; Maria Antonietta Buccheri; Noemi Carrozza; Veronica Gallo; Laila Huric; Claudia Modaelli; Enrica Piccoli; Ludovica Redaelli; Raffaella Baldi (FR); Elena Sernagiotto (FR) | 83.6333 | 71.8801 | 155.5134 |
| 5 | France (FRA); Carolane Canavese; Esther Ducrocq; Inesse Guermoud; Solène Lusseau; Estelle Philibert; Abbygaëlle Slonina; Charlotte Tremble; Laura Tremble; Alice Carbonnel (FR); Camille Egidio (FR) | 83.5333 | 71.9545 | 155.4878 |
| 6 | Belarus (BLR); Aliaksandra Bichun; Hanna Kulpo; Anastasiya Navasiolava; Hanna Shulhina; Volha Taleiko; Dominika Tsyplakova; Valeryia Valasach; Elmira Wardak; Maria Egorova (FR); Nastassia Shkuleva (FR) | 81.4000 | 72.2341 | 153.6341 |
| 7 | Greece (GRE); Maria Eleni Armaou; Ifigeneia Dipla; Valentina Farantouri; Giana Gkeorgkieva; Sofia Malkogeorgou; Anastasia Taxopoulou; Anna Maria Taxopoulou; Athanasia Tsola; Vasiliki Kofidi (FR); Maria Papadokonstantaki (FR) | 81.2667 | 69.9074 | 151.1741 |
| 8 | Switzerland (SUI); Maxence Bellina; Christine Fluri; Melisande Jaccard; Vivienne Koch; Joelle Peschl; Maria Piffaretti; Pauline Rosselet; Sarina Weibel; Anaïs Bernard (FR); Lara Soto Couceiro (FR) | 79.4667 | 70.5972 | 150.0639 |
| 9 | Great Britain (GBR); Phoebe Bradley-Smith; Jorja Brown; Jodie Cowie; Emma Critchley; Esme Lower; Genevieve Randall; Hannah Randall; Rebecca Richardson; Danielle Cooper (FR); Lara Hockin (FR) | 76.4333 | 68.1716 | 144.6049 |
| 10 | Netherlands (NED); Bregje de Brouwer; Noortje de Brouwer; Shelby Kasse; Mirthe Kuperus; Eva Meulblok; Lotte Tromp; Jori van den Hoogen; Adriani Vasilakis; Diede Bronkhorst (FR); Laura van Meel (FR) | 75.7000 | 68.5534 | 144.2534 |
| 11 | Turkey (TUR); Defne Bakırcı; Öykü Evliya; Mısra Gündeş; Dilay Horasan; Rezzan Eda Tuncay; Ebru Mina Turhan; Selin Ünser; Hande Yıldız; Nurberat Gökmen (FR); Öykü Halis (FR) | 74.9667 | 67.3818 | 142.3485 |
| 12 | Slovakia (SVK); Simona Barutová; Nada Daabousová; Petra Ďurišová; Miroslava Kratinová; Sophia Lobpreisová; Diana Miškechová; Natália Pivarčiová; Rebecca Schererová; Júlia Bachárová (FR); Alexandra Ratajová (FR) | 73.9333 | 65.9097 | 139.8430 |
