= Artistic swimming at the 2020 European Aquatics Championships – Combination routine =

Combination routine at the 2020 European Aquatics Championships
- Venue: Danube Arena
- Dates: 13 May 2021
- Competitors: 40 from 4 nations
- Teams: 4
- Winning points: 94.7000

Medalists
gold medal	Maryna Aleksiiva; Vladyslava Aleksiiva; Olesia Derevianchenko; Marta Fiedina; Veronika Hryshko; Kateryna Reznik; Anastasiya Savchuk; Alina Shynkarenko; Kseniya Sydorenko; Yelyzaveta Yakhno	Ukraine
silver medal	Maria Alzigkouzi Kominea; Eleni Deligianni; Eleni Fragkaki; Krystalenia Gialama; Pinelopi Karamesiou; Zoi Karangelou; Danai Kariori; Andriana Misikevych; Georgia Vasilopoulou; Violeta Zouzouni	Greece
bronze medal	Vera Butsel; Marharyta Kiryliuk; Hanna Koutsun; Yana Kudzina; Kseniya Kuliashova; Anastasiya Navasiolava; Valeryia Puz; Anastasiya Suvalava; Kseniya Tratseuskaya; Aliaksandra Vysotskaya	Belarus

The Combination routine competition of the 2020 European Aquatics Championships was held on 13 May 2021.

== Results ==
The final was held at 16:00.

Rank	Nation	Swimmers	Points
1st place, gold medalist(s)	Ukraine	Maryna Aleksiiva; Vladyslava Aleksiiva; Olesia Derevianchenko; Marta Fiedina; Veronika Hryshko; Kateryna Reznik; Anastasiya Savchuk; Alina Shynkarenko; Kseniya Sydorenko; Yelyzaveta Yakhno	94.7000
2nd place, silver medalist(s)	Greece	Maria Alzigkouzi Kominea; Eleni Deligianni; Eleni Fragkaki; Krystalenia Gialama; Pinelopi Karamesiou; Zoi Karangelou; Danai Kariori; Andriana Misikevych; Georgia Vasilopoulou; Violeta Zouzouni	89.1000
3rd place, bronze medalist(s)	Belarus	Vera Butsel; Marharyta Kiryliuk; Hanna Koutsun; Yana Kudzina; Kseniya Kuliashova; Anastasiya Navasiolava; Valeryia Puz; Anastasiya Suvalava; Kseniya Tratseuskaya; Aliaksandra Vysotskaya	86.0667
4	Hungary	Anna Apáthy; Niké Barta; Linda Farkas; Boglárka Gács; Lilien Götz; Hanna Hatala; Szabina Hungler; Adelin Regényi; Luca Rényi; Anna Viktória Szabó	78.7667
