= Kateryna Tkachova =

Ukrainian synchronised swimmer

Personal information
- Nationality: Ukrainian
- Born: 21 October 1998 (age 27) Kharkiv, Ukraine
- Height: 1.67 m (5 ft 6 in)
- Weight: 46 kg (101 lb)

Sport
- Sport: Swimming
- Strokes: Synchronised swimming
Medal record
Women's synchronised swimming
Representing Ukraine
Event	1st	2nd	3rd
European Games	0	0	2
World Junior Championships	0	0	1
European Junior Championships	0	4	0
Total	0	4	3
European Games
Bronze medal – third place	2015 Baku	Team
Bronze medal – third place	2015 Baku	Free routine combination
World Junior Championships
Bronze medal – third place	2016 Kazan	Team routine
European Junior Championships
Silver medal – second place	2013 Poznań	Team routine
Silver medal – second place	2013 Poznań	Free routine combination
Silver medal – second place	2016 Rijeka	Team routine
Silver medal – second place	2016 Rijeka	Free routine combination

Kateryna Tkachova (Ukrainian: Катерина Ткачова; born 21 October 1998 in Kharkiv, Ukraine) is a Ukrainian synchronised swimmer. She won two bronze medals at the inaugural European Games where she was third in team and combination competitions.
