= Oleksandra Kashuba =

Ukrainian synchronized swimmer

Personal information
- National team: Ukraine
- Born: 6 June 1996 (age 30) Donetsk, Ukraine
- Height: 1.81 m (5 ft 11 in)

Sport
- Sport: Swimming
- Strokes: Synchronized swimming
Medal record
Women's artistic swimming
Representing Ukraine
Event	1st	2nd	3rd
World Championships	0	1	1
European Championships	3	2	0
World Junior Championships	0	1	1
European Junior Championships	0	2	0
Total	3	6	2
World Championships
Silver medal – second place	2017 Budapest	Free routine combination
Bronze medal – third place	2017 Budapest	Team free routine
European Championships
Gold medal – first place	2014 Berlin	Free routine combination
Gold medal – first place	2016 London	Team free routine
Gold medal – first place	2018 Glasgow	Free routine combination
Silver medal – second place	2018 Glasgow	Team free routine
Silver medal – second place	2018 Glasgow	Team technical routine
World Junior Championships
Silver medal – second place	2012 Volos	Team routine
Bronze medal – third place	2012 Volos	Free routine combination
European Junior Championships
Silver medal – second place	2013 Poznań	Team routine
Silver medal – second place	2013 Poznań	Free routine combination

Oleksandra Kashuba (Ukrainian: Олександра Кашуба, born 6 June 1996) is a Ukrainian competitor in synchronized swimming.

She won a gold medal at the 2014 European Aquatics Championships and 2016 European Aquatics Championships. At the 2017 World Aquatics Championships Kashuba won a silver medal in combination event and a bronze medal in team free routine.

== Extermnal links ==
- FINA profile
