= Synchronised swimming at the 2015 European Games – Women's solo =

Synchronised swimming – Women's solo at the 2015 European Games
- Venue: Baku Aquatics Centre
- Date: 13–16 June
- Competitors: 21 from 21 nations

Medalists
gold medal	Anisiya Neborako	Russia
silver medal	Berta Ferreras	Spain
bronze medal	Anna-Maria Alexandri	Austria

The Women's solo event at the 2015 European Games in Baku took place between 13 and 16 June at the Baku Aquatics Centre.

== Schedule ==
All times are local (UTC+5).

Date	Time	Event
Saturday, 13 June 2015	10:00	Free Routine Preliminary
Sunday, 14 June 2015	09:00	Figures
Tuesday, 16 June 2015	10:00	Free Routine Final

== Results ==
=== Preliminary ===
Rank	Athlete	Country	Free	Figures	Total	Notes
1	Anisiya Neborako	Russia	89.1333	80.9591	170.0924	Q
2	Berta Ferreras	Spain	86.6333	76.0091	162.6424	Q
3	Anna-Maria Alexandri	Austria	84.2000	76.4000	160.6000	Q
4	Yelyzaveta Yakhno	Ukraine	86.1667	73.7545	159.9212	Q
5	Noemi Carrozza	Italy	84.9333	74.5182	159.4515	Q
6	Inesse Guermoud	France	82.7667	74.7364	157.5031	Q
7	Athanasia Tsola	Greece	81.3000	74.8727	156.1727	Q
8	Volha Taleiko	Belarus	78.3000	72.9500	151.2500	Q
9	Lara Mechnig	Liechtenstein	76.0333	73.4000	149.4333	Q
10	Nada Daabousová	Slovakia	74.7333	73.7182	148.4515	Q
11	Vivienne Koch	Switzerland	77.4000	70.4864	147.8864	Q
12	Defne Bakırcı	Turkey	75.7667	71.0182	146.7849	Q
13	Genevieve Randall	Great Britain	76.2333	70.0727	146.3060	
14	Michelle Zimmer	Germany	73.7667	70.3364	144.1031	
15	Yekaterina Valiulina	Azerbaijan	72.3000	70.7000	143.0000	
16	Shelby Kasse	Netherlands	74.5000	66.7955	141.2955	
17	Marie Vlasáková	Czech Republic	72.1333	67.5500	139.6833	
18	Gal Litman	Israel	70.2667	68.4591	138.7258	
19	Swietłana Szczepańska	Poland	68.5667	65.0909	133.6576	
20	Maria Kirkova	Bulgaria	66.6000	63.1864	129.7864	
21	Veronka Szabó	Hungary	70.7000	51.2182	121.9182	

=== Final ===
Rank	Athlete	Country	Free	Figures	Total
1st place, gold medalist(s)	Anisiya Neborako	Russia	90.0333	80.9591	170.9924
2nd place, silver medalist(s)	Berta Ferreras	Spain	86.9667	76.0091	162.9758
3rd place, bronze medalist(s)	Anna-Maria Alexandri	Austria	86.0333	76.4000	162.4333
4	Yelyzaveta Yakhno	Ukraine	85.9333	73.7545	159.6878
5	Noemi Carrozza	Italy	84.7000	74.5182	159.2182
6	Athanasia Tsola	Greece	81.5333	74.8727	156.4060
7	Inesse Guermoud	France	81.5667	74.7364	156.3031
8	Volha Taleiko	Belarus	78.7667	72.9500	151.7167
9	Nada Daabousová	Slovakia	76.6667	73.7182	150.3849
10	Lara Mechnig	Liechtenstein	76.7667	73.4000	150.1667
11	Vivienne Koch	Switzerland	79.0667	70.4864	149.5531
12	Defne Bakırcı	Turkey	76.3667	71.0182	147.3849
