= Synchronised swimming at the 2018 European Aquatics Championships – Team free routine =

Team free routine at the 2018 European Aquatics Championships
- Venue: Scotstoun Sports Campus
- Dates: 3 August (preliminary); 4 August (final)
- Competitors: 104 from 13 nations
- Teams: 13
- Winning points: 97.0333

Medalists
gold medal	Anastasia Arkhipovskaya; Anastasia Bayandina; Daria Bayandina; Marina Goliadkina; Veronika Kalinina; Polina Komar; Maria Shurochkina; Darina Valitova; Mikhaela Kalancha	Russia
silver medal	Valeriia Aprielieva; Veronika Hryshko; Oleksandra Kashuba; Yana Nariezhna; Kateryna Reznik; Anastasiya Savchuk; Alina Shynkarenko; Yelyzaveta Yakhno; Maryna Aleksiiva; Oleksandra Kovalenko	Ukraine
bronze medal	Beatrice Callegari; Linda Cerruti; Francesca Deidda; Costanza Di Camillo; Costanza Ferro; Gemma Galli; Alessia Pezone; Enrica Piccoli; Domiziana Cavanna; Federica Sala	Italy

The Team free routine competition of the 2018 European Aquatics Championships was held on 3 and 4 August 2018.

== Results ==
The preliminary round was held on 3 August at 09:00. The final was started on 4 August at 13:30.

Green denotes finalists

Rank	Nation	Preliminary		Final	
Rank	Nation	Points	Rank	Points	Rank
1st place, gold medalist(s)	Russia	95.5000	1	97.0333	1
2nd place, silver medalist(s)	Ukraine	93.4333	2	94.6000	2
3rd place, bronze medalist(s)	Italy	90.8333	4	92.2333	3
4	Spain	91.3333	3	92.1000	4
5	Greece	86.0333	6	87.6333	5
6	France	86.4667	5	87.5000	6
7	Belarus	82.5333	7	83.6000	7
8	Israel	82.2333	8	83.1000	8
9	Great Britain	78.3667	9	78.9333	9
10	Germany	76.6333	11	78.8000	10
11	Austria	77.0667	10	78.5667	11
12	Portugal	74.2333	12	75.9000	12
13	Turkey	74.0000	13		
