= Synchronized swimming at the 2017 World Aquatics Championships – Team free routine =

Team free routine at the 2017 World Aquatics Championships
- Venue: City Park
- Location: Budapest, Hungary
- Dates: 19 July (preliminaries); 21 July (final)
- Competitors: 200 from 25 nations
- Teams: 25
- Winning points: 97.3000

Medalists
gold medal	Anastasia Bayandina; Daria Bayandina; Vlada Chigireva; Maryna Goliadkina; Veronika Kalinina; Polina Komar; Maria Shurochkina; Darina Valitova	Russia
silver medal	Feng Yu; Guo Li; Liang Xinping; Tang Mengni; Chang Hao; Yu Lele; Xiao Yanning; Yin Chengxin	China
bronze medal	Vladyslava Aleksiiva; Valeriia Aprielieva; Anna Voloshyna; Oleksandra Kashuba; Yelyzaveta Yakhno; Anastasiya Savchuk; Kseniya Sydorenko; Maryna Aleksiiva	Ukraine

The Team free routine competition at the 2017 World Championships was held on 19 and 21 July 2017.

== Results ==
The preliminary round was started on 19 July at 19:00. The final was held on 21 July at 11:00.

Green denotes finalists

Rank	Nation	Preliminary		Final	
Rank	Nation	Points	Rank	Points	Rank
1st place, gold medalist(s)	Russia	96.8000	1	97.3000	1
2nd place, silver medalist(s)	China	94.3667	2	95.2333	2
3rd place, bronze medalist(s)	Ukraine	92.9000	3	93.9333	3
4	Japan	92.4667	4	93.1000	4
5	Italy	90.4667	5	91.7000	5
6	Spain	89.9333	6	90.7000	6
7	Canada	88.2667	7	88.8000	7
8	Mexico	87.9000	8	87.9000	8
9	Greece	85.3667	9	86.4333	9
10	France	85.0333	10	85.4667	10
11	North Korea	83.6000	11	83.7667	11
12	United States	82.9667	12	83.5667	12
13	Belarus	82.5333	13	did not advance	
14	Switzerland	81.3667	14	did not advance	
15	Kazakhstan	80.6667	15	did not advance	
16	Hungary	78.3333	16	did not advance	
17	Uzbekistan	77.3333	17	did not advance	
18	Australia	76.0333	18	did not advance	
19	Slovakia	75.5667	19	did not advance	
20	Singapore	74.9000	20	did not advance	
21	Egypt	74.1000	21	did not advance	
22	Israel	73.0667	22	did not advance	
23	Macau	70.7333	23	did not advance	
24	Costa Rica	66.9000	24	did not advance	
25	South Africa	62.1333	25	did not advance	
