= Synchronised swimming at the 2018 European Aquatics Championships – Mixed technical routine =

Mixed technical routine at the 2018 European Aquatics Championships
- Venue: Scotstoun Sports Campus
- Dates: 3 August
- Competitors: 8 from 4 nations
- Teams: 4
- Winning points: 89.5853

Medalists
gold medal	Mayya Gurbanberdieva; Aleksandr Maltsev	Russia
silver medal	Manila Flamini; Giorgio Minisini	Italy
bronze medal	Berta Ferreras; Pau Ribes	Spain

The Mixed technical routine competition of the 2018 European Aquatics Championships will be held on 3 August 2018.

== Results ==
The final was held at 14:42.

Rank	Nation	Swimmers	Points
1st place, gold medalist(s)	Russia	Mayya Gurbanberdieva; Aleksandr Maltsev	89.5853
2nd place, silver medalist(s)	Italy	Manila Flamini; Giorgio Minisini	88.6973
3rd place, bronze medalist(s)	Spain	Berta Ferreras; Pau Ribes	82.3217
4	Greece	Vasileios Gkortsilas; Nikoleta Papegeorgiou	72.7838
