= Synchronised swimming at the 2015 European Games – Women's free combination =

Synchronised swimming - Women's free combination at the 2015 European Games
- Venue: Baku Aquatics Centre
- Date: 13, 16 June
- Competitors: 132 from 14 nations

Medalists
gold medal	Anastasia Arkhipovskaya; Valeriya Filenkova; Mayya Gurbanberdieva; Veronika Kalinina; Daria Kulagina; Anna Larkina; Anisiya Neborako; Mariia Nemchinova; Elizaveta Ovchinnikova; Maria Salmina	Russia
silver medal	Julia Echeberría; Berta Ferreras; Helena Jaumà; María del Carmen Juárez; Emilia Luboslavova; Raquel Navarro; Sara Saldaña; Itzíar Sánchez; Irene Toledano; Lidia Vigara	Spain
bronze medal	Valeriia Aprielieva; Valeriya Berezhna; Veronika Gryshko; Yana Nariezhna; Alina Shynkarenko; Kateryna Tkachova; Yelyzaveta Yakhno; Anna Yesipova	Ukraine

The Women's free combination event at the 2015 European Games in Baku took place 13 and 16 June at the Baku Aquatics Centre.

== Schedule ==
All times are local (UTC+5).

Date	Time	Event
Saturday, 13 June 2015	18:00	Preliminary
Tuesday, 16 June 2015	18:00	Final

== Results ==
Green denotes finalists

Rank	Athlete	Preliminary		Final	
Rank	Athlete	Points	Rank	Points	Rank
1st place, gold medalist(s)	Russia (RUS); Anastasia Arkhipovskaya; Valeriya Filenkova; Mayya Gurbanberdieva; Veronika Kalinina; Daria Kulagina; Anna Larkina; Anisiya Neborako; Mariia Nemchinova; Elizaveta Ovchinnikova; Maria Salmina	89.0000	1	90.2333	1
2nd place, silver medalist(s)	Spain (ESP); Julia Echeberría; Berta Ferreras; Helena Jaumà; María del Carmen Juárez; Emilia Luboslavova; Raquel Navarro; Sara Saldaña; Itzíar Sánchez; Irene Toledano; Lidia Vigara	86.9667	2	87.7333	2
3rd place, bronze medalist(s)	Ukraine (UKR); Valeriia Aprielieva; Valeriya Berezhna; Veronika Gryshko; Yana Nariezhna; Alina Shynkarenko; Kateryna Tkachova; Yelyzaveta Yakhno; Anna Yesipova	86.4667	3	86.8667	3
4	Italy (ITA); Beatrice Amadei; Raffaella Baldi; Maria Antonietta Buccheri; Noemi Carrozza; Veronica Gallo; Laila Huric; Claudia Modaelli; Enrica Piccoli; Ludovica Redaelli; Elena Sernagiotto	84.8000	4	84.8667	4
5	France (FRA); Carolane Canavese; Alice Carbonnel; Esther Ducrocq; Camille Egidio; Inesse Guermoud; Solène Lusseau; Estelle Philibert; Abbygaëlle Slonina; Charlotte Tremble; Laura Tremble	82.7000	5	82.6333	5
6	Greece (GRE); Maria Armaou; Ifigeneia Dipla; Valentina Farantouri; Giana Gkeorgkieva; Vasiliki Kofidi; Sofia Malkogeorgou; Maria Papadokonstantaki; Anastasia Taxopoulou; Anna Maria Taxopoulou; Athanasia Tsola	81.9000	6	82.2333	6
7	Belarus (BLR); Aliaksandra Bichun; Maria Egorova; Hanna Kulpo; Anastasiya Navasiolava; Nastassia Shkuleva; Hanna Shulhina; Volha Taleiko; Dominika Tsyplakova; Valeryia Valasach; Elmira Wardak	80.7000	7	80.4667	7
8	Switzerland (SUI); Maxence Bellina; Anaïs Bernard; Christine Fluri; Mélisande Jaccard; Vivienne Koch; Joelle Peschl; Maria Piffaretti; Pauline Rosselet; Lara Soto Couceiro; Sarina Weibel	79.4333	8	79.2000	8
9	Netherlands (NED); Diede Bronkhorst; Bregje de Brouwer; Noortje de Brouwer; Shelby Kasse; Mirthe Kuperus; Eva Meulblok; Lotte Tromp; Jori van den Hoogen; Laura van Meel; Adriani Vasilakis	76.4667	9	77.0667	9
10	Great Britain (GBR); Phoebe Bradley-Smith; Jorja Brown; Danielle Cooper; Jodie Cowie; Emma Critchley; Lara Hockin; Esme Lower; Genevieve Randall; Hannah Randall; Rebecca Richardson	74.9000	10	75.9000	10
11	Turkey (TUR); Defne Bakırcı; Öykü Evliya; Nurberat Gökmen; Mısra Gündeş; Öykü Halis; Dilay Horasan; Rezzan Eda Tuncay; Ebru Mina Turhan; Selin Ünser; Hande Yıldız	74.8000	11	75.6667	11
12	Slovakia (SVK); Júlia Bachárová; Simona Barutová; Nada Daabousová; Petra Ďurišová; Miroslava Kratinová; Sophia Lobpreisová; Diana Miškechová; Natália Pivarčiová; Alexandra Ratajová; Rebecca Schererová	74.0333	12	74.5667	12
13	Austria (AUT); Eirini-Marina Alexandri; Vasiliki-Pagona Alexandri; Raffaela Breit; Verena Breit; Vanessa Gamauf; Edit Pinter	72.8000	13	did not advance	
14	Hungary (HUN); Dorina Dimanopulosz; Adél Fodor; Viktória Harcsa; Lili Kertai; Fanni Kézdi; Sarolta Lukovszky; Alexandra Riemer; Veronka Szabó	71.9000	14	did not advance	
