= Anastasia Bayandina =

French-Russian synchronised swimmer

Personal information
- Nationality: Russian
- Born: 1 November 1996 (age 29) Krasnoyarsk, Russia

Sport
- Country: Russia; France
- Sport: Synchronised swimming
Medal record
Women's synchronised swimming
Representing France
European Games
| Gold medal – first place | 2023 Kraków-Małopolska | Team acrobatic routine |
| Bronze medal – third place | 2023 Kraków-Małopolska | Team technical routine |
European Artistic Swimming Championships
| Bronze medal – third place | 2025 Funchal | Duet technical routine |
Representing Russia
World Championships
| Gold medal – first place | 2017 Budapest | Team technical routine |
| Gold medal – first place | 2017 Budapest | Team free routine |
European Championships
| Gold medal – first place | 2018 Glasgow | Team free routine |
| Gold medal – first place | 2018 Glasgow | Team technical routine |

Anastasia Bayandina (born 1 November 1996) is a French-Russian synchronised swimmer.

She won a gold medal in the team free routine competition at the 2018 European Aquatics Championships.

In December 2018, after being excluded from the Russian national team in the run-up to the 2024 Olympics, Anastasia and her twin sister, Daria Bayandina, contacted the French Swimming Federation. An agreement is reached, the Russian federation accepts the transfer, then Anastasia begins to train at INSEP. Naturalized in 2021 at the same time as her sister, Anastasia Bayandina is participating in the Paris 2024 Summer Olympic Games in team and duo.
