= Synchronised swimming at the 2015 European Games =

Synchronized swimming at the 2015 European Games
- Venue: Aquatics Centre
- Dates: 12–16 June 2015
- Competitors: 150 expected

Synchronised swimming competitions at the 2015 European Games in Baku were held from 12 to 16 June, at the Baku Aquatics Centre.

Synchronised swimming was not included in the earliest list of sports confirmed for the 2015 Games, as the European swimming authorities at that stage were minded not to take part. However, following negotiations with the organising authorities, a compromise was reached whereby, in 2015, these events were for junior swimmers only - in effect, under 18 for women.

== Medalists ==
Event	Gold	Silver	Bronze
Solo	Anisiya Neborako; Russia	Berta Ferreras; Spain	Anna-Maria Alexandri; Austria
Duet	Russia (RUS); Valeriya Filenkova; Daria Kulagina	Austria (AUT); Anna-Maria Alexandri; Eirini-Marina Alexandri	Ukraine (UKR); Yana Nariezhna; Yelyzaveta Yakhno
Team	Russia (RUS); Valeria Filenkova; Mayya Gurbanberdieva; Veronika Kalinina; Daria Kulagina; Anna Larkina; Anisiya Neborako; ~~Mariia Nemchinova~~; Maria Salmina; Anastasia Arkhipovskaya; Elizaveta Ovchinnikova	Spain (ESP); Julia Echeberría; Berta Ferreras; Helena Jaumà; María del Carmen Juárez; Emilia Luboslavova; Raquel Navarro; Itzíar Sánchez; Irene Toledano; Sara Saldaña; Lidia Vigara	Ukraine (UKR); Valeriia Aprielieva; Valeriya Berezhna; Veronika Gryshko; Yana Nariezhna; Alina Shynkarenko; Kateryna Tkachova; Yelyzaveta Yakhno; Anna Yesipova
Free combination	Russia (RUS); Anastasia Arkhipovskaya; Valeriya Filenkova; Mayya Gurbanberdieva; Veronika Kalinina; Daria Kulagina; Anna Larkina; Anisiya Neborako; ~~Mariia Nemchinova~~; Elizaveta Ovchinnikova; Maria Salmina	Spain (ESP); Julia Echeberría; Berta Ferreras; Helena Jaumà; María del Carmen Juárez; Emilia Luboslavova; Raquel Navarro; Sara Saldaña; Itzíar Sánchez; Irene Toledano; Lidia Vigara	Ukraine (UKR); Valeriia Aprielieva; Valeriya Berezhna; Veronika Gryshko; Yana Nariezhna; Alina Shynkarenko; Kateryna Tkachova; Yelyzaveta Yakhno; Anna Yesipova

== Medal table ==
Rank	Nation	Gold	Silver	Bronze	Total
1	Russia (RUS)	4	0	0	4
2	Spain (ESP)	0	3	0	3
3	Austria (AUT)	0	1	1	2
4	Ukraine (UKR)	0	0	3	3
Totals (4 entries)		4	4	4	12

== Participating nations ==
A total of 150 athletes from 21 nations competed in Synchronised swimming at the 2015 European Games.

- Austria (9)
- Azerbaijan (2)
- Belarus (10)
- Bulgaria (2)
- Czech Republic (2)
- Spain (10)
- France (10)
- Great Britain (10)
- Germany (1)
- Greece (10)
- Hungary (8)
- Israel (2)
- Italy (10)
- Liechtenstein (2)
- Netherlands (10)
- Poland (2)
- Russia (10)
- Switzerland (10)
- Slovakia (10)
- Turkey (10)
- Ukraine (10)
