= Synchronised swimming at the 2015 European Games – Women's duet =

Synchronised swimming – Women's duet at the 2015 European Games
- Venue: Baku Aquatics Centre
- Date: 12–15 June
- Competitors: 40 from 20 nations

Medalists
gold medal	Valeriya Filenkova; Daria Kulagina	Russia
silver medal	Anna-Maria Alexandri; Eirini-Marina Alexandri	Austria
bronze medal	Yana Nariezhna; Yelyzaveta Yakhno	Ukraine

The Women's duet event at the 2015 European Games in Baku was held from 12 to 15 June at the Baku Aquatics Centre.

== Schedule ==
All times are local (UTC+5).

Date	Time	Event
Friday, 12 June 2015	12:00	Free Routine Preliminary
Sunday, 14 June 2015	09:00	Figures
Monday, 15 June 2015	10:00	Free Routine Final

== Results ==
=== Preliminary ===
Rank	Athlete	Country	Free	Figures	Total	Notes
1	Valeriya Filenkova; Daria Kulagina	Russia	89.2333	79.7568	168.9901	Q
2	Yana Nariezhna; Yelyzaveta Yakhno	Ukraine	87.5333	74.3500	161.8833	Q
3	Anna-Maria Alexandri; Eirini-Marina Alexandri	Austria	83.8333	76.9728	160.8061	Q
4	Julia Echeberría; Irene Toledano	Spain	85.7333	74.7046	160.4379	Q
5	Noemi Carrozza; Laila Huric	Italy	83.8000	74.1932	157.9932	Q
6	Giana Gkeorgkieva; Athanasia Tsola	Greece	81.9667	74.0772	156.0439	Q
7	Charlotte Tremble; Laura Tremble	France	81.2000	70.6864	151.8864	Q
8	Hanna Shulhina; Dominika Tsyplakova	Belarus	77.3667	72.5636	149.9303	Q
9	Maxence Bellina; Maria Piffaretti	Switzerland	77.2333	71.5182	148.7515	Q
10	Bregje de Brouwer; Noortje de Brouwer	Netherlands	77.3333	70.9273	148.2606	Q
11	Defne Bakırcı; Misra Gündeş	Turkey	75.2333	69.5864	144.8197	Q
12	Jodie Cowie; Genevieve Randall	Great Britain	75.1667	69.2659	144.4326	Q
13	Lara Mechnig; Marluce Schierscher	Liechtenstein	71.6000	70.7228	142.3228	
14	Petra Ďurišová; Diana Miškechová	Slovakia	72.3333	68.8228	141.1561	
15	Tatyana Nikitina; Yekaterina Valiulina	Azerbaijan	71.4333	69.3841	140.8174	
16	Adél Fodor; Viktória Harcsa	Hungary	71.6667	67.3705	139.0372	
17	Aviv-Lea Bublil; Gal Litman	Israel	72.1000	66.9000	139.0000	
18	Šárka Kociánová; Marie Vlasáková	Czech Republic	71.6667	67.0478	138.7145	
19	Wiktoria Grabowska; Swietlana Szczepańska	Poland	66.7000	64.2250	130.9250	
20	Maria Kirkova; Mihaela Peeva	Bulgaria	66.5667	61.9386	128.5053	

=== Final ===
Rank	Athlete	Country	Free	Figures	Total
1st place, gold medalist(s)	Valeriya Filenkova; Daria Kulagina	Russia	89.3000	79.7568	169.0568
2nd place, silver medalist(s)	Anna-Maria Alexandri; Eirini-Marina Alexandri	Austria	85.8667	76.9728	162.8395
3rd place, bronze medalist(s)	Yana Nariezhna; Yelyzaveta Yakhno	Ukraine	87.3000	74.3500	161.6500
4	Julia Echeberría; Irene Toledano	Spain	86.1000	74.7046	160.8046
5	Noemi Carrozza; Laila Huric	Italy	83.9333	74.1932	158.1265
6	Giana Gkeorgkieva; Athanasia Tsola	Greece	81.5333	74.0772	155.6105
7	Charlotte Tremble; Laura Tremble	France	82.0333	70.6864	152.7197
8	Hanna Shulhina; Dominika Tsyplakova	Belarus	78.4667	72.5636	151.0303
9	Maxence Bellina; Maria Piffaretti	Switzerland	77.5667	71.5182	149.0849
10	Bregje de Brouwer; Noortje de Brouwer	Netherlands	77.6667	70.9273	148.5940
11	Defne Bakırcı; Misra Gündes	Turkey	76.3667	69.5864	145.9531
12	Jodie Cowie; Genevieve Randall	Great Britain	75.3000	69.2659	144.5659
