= Artistic swimming at the 2020 European Aquatics Championships – Team free routine =

Team free routine at the 2020 European Aquatics Championships
- Venue: Danube Arena
- Dates: 14 May 2021
- Competitors: 56 from 7 nations
- Teams: 7
- Winning points: 95.0667

Medalists
| gold medal | Maryna Aleksiiva; Vladyslava Aleksiiva; Marta Fiedina; Kateryna Reznik; Anastasiya Savchuk; Alina Shynkarenko; Kseniya Sydorenko; Yelyzaveta Yakhno | Ukraine |
| silver medal | Abril Conesa; Berta Ferreras; Meritxell Mas; Alisa Ozhogina; Paula Ramírez; Sara Saldaña; Iris Tió; Blanca Toledano | Spain |
| bronze medal | Eden Blecher; Shelly Bobritsky; Maya Dorf; Noy Gazala; Catherine Kunin; Nikol Nahshonov; Ariel Nassee; Polina Prikazchikova | Israel |

The Team free routine competition of the 2020 European Aquatics Championships was held on 14 May 2021.

== Results ==
The final was held at 16:00.

| Rank | Nation | Swimmers | Points |
|---|---|---|---|
| 1st place, gold medalist(s) | Ukraine | Maryna Aleksiiva; Vladyslava Aleksiiva; Marta Fiedina; Kateryna Reznik; Anastasiya Savchuk; Alina Shynkarenko; Kseniya Sydorenko; Yelyzaveta Yakhno | 95.0667 |
| 2nd place, silver medalist(s) | Spain | Abril Conesa; Berta Ferreras; Meritxell Mas; Alisa Ozhogina; Paula Ramírez; Sara Saldaña; Iris Tió; Blanca Toledano | 91.2333 |
| 3rd place, bronze medalist(s) | Israel | Eden Blecher; Shelly Bobritsky; Maya Dorf; Noy Gazala; Catherine Kunin; Nikol Nahshonov; Ariel Nassee; Polina Prikazchikova | 86.8000 |
| 4 | Belarus | Marharyta Kiryliuk; Hanna Koutsun; Yana Kudzina; Kseniya Kuliashova; Anastasiya Navasiolava; Valeryia Puz; Kseniya Tratseuskaya; Aliaksandra Vysotskaya | 86.3333 |
| 5 | Great Britain | Millicent Costello; Isobel Davies; Daisy Gunn; Cerys Hughes; Cerys Larsen; Daniella Lloyd; Robyn Swatman; Laura Turberville | 81.8333 |
| 6 | Hungary | Linda Farkas; Boglárka Gács; Lilien Götz; Hanna Hatala; Szabina Hungler; Adelin Regényi; Luca Rényi; Anna Viktória Szabó | 77.4000 |
| 7 | Poland | Adrianna Aleksak; Dominika Herich; Maja Kalisz; Martyna Paulińska; Barbara Rybicka; Kamila Sahli Ousini; Swietłana Szczepańska; Martyna Wójcik | 72.500 |
