= Pau Ribes =

Spanish synchronized swimmer

Personal information
- Full name: Pau Ribes Culla
- Nationality: Spanish
- Born: 1 September 1995 (age 30)

Sport
- Country: Spain
- Sport: Synchronised swimming
Medal record
Men's artistic swimming
Representing Spain
European Championships
Silver medal – second place	2020 Budapest	Mixed technical routine
Silver medal – second place	2022 Rome	Mixed free routine
Silver medal – second place	2022 Rome	Mixed technical routine
Bronze medal – third place	2016 London	Mixed free routine
Bronze medal – third place	2016 London	Mixed technical routine
Bronze medal – third place	2018 Glasgow	Mixed free routine
Bronze medal – third place	2018 Glasgow	Mixed technical routine

Pau Ribes Culla (Note: In this Spanish name, the first or paternal surname is Ribes and the second or maternal family name is Culla.) (born 1 September 1995) is a Spanish synchronised swimmer.

He won a bronze medal in the mixed free routine competition at the 2018 European Aquatics Championships.
