= Synchronised swimming at the 2018 European Aquatics Championships – Mixed free routine =

Mixed free routine at the 2018 European Aquatics Championships
- Venue: Scotstoun Sports Campus
- Dates: 7 August
- Competitors: 10 from 5 nations
- Teams: 5
- Winning points: 92.4000

Medalists
gold medal	Mayya Gurbanberdieva aleksandr Maltsev	Russia
silver medal	Manila Flamini; Giorgio Minisini	Italy
bronze medal	Berta Ferreras; Pau Ribes	Spain

The Mixed free routine competition of the 2018 European Aquatics Championships was held on 7 August 2018.

== Results ==
The final was started at 10:11.

Rank	Nation	Swimmers	
Rank	Nation	Swimmers	Points
1st place, gold medalist(s)	Russia	Mayya Gurbanberdieva; Aleksandr Maltsev	92.4000
2nd place, silver medalist(s)	Italy	Manila Flamini; Giorgio Minisini	90.7333
3rd place, bronze medalist(s)	Spain	Berta Ferreras; Pau Ribes	85.4333
4	Greece	Vasileios Gkortsilas; Nikoleta Papegeorgiou	74.9333
5	Turkey	Gökçen Akgün; Rezzan Eda Tunçay	72.2000
