= Artistic swimming at the 2020 European Aquatics Championships – Team technical routine =

Team technical routine at the 2020 European Aquatics Championships
- Venue: Danube Arena
- Dates: 12 May 2021
- Competitors: 56 from 7 nations
- Teams: 7
- Winning points: 95.6705

Medalists
gold medal	Vlada Chigireva; Marina Goliadkina; Veronika Kalinina; Svetlana Kolesnichenko; Polina Komar; Svetlana Romashina; Alla Shishkina; Maria Shurochkina	Russia
silver medal	Maryna Aleksiiva; Vladyslava Aleksiiva; Marta Fiedina; Kateryna Reznik; Anastasiya Savchuk; Alina Shynkarenko; Kseniya Sydorenko; Yelyzaveta Yakhno	Ukraine
bronze medal	Ona Carbonell; Berta Ferreras; Meritxell Mas; Alisa Ozhogina; Paula Ramírez; Sara Saldaña; Iris Tió; Blanca Toledano	Spain

The Team technical routine competition of the 2020 European Aquatics Championships was held on 12 May 2021.

== Results ==
The final was held at 16:00.

Rank	Nation	Swimmers	Points
1st place, gold medalist(s)	Russia	Vlada Chigireva; Marina Goliadkina; Veronika Kalinina; Svetlana Kolesnichenko; Polina Komar; Svetlana Romashina; Alla Shishkina; Maria Shurochkina	95.6705
2nd place, silver medalist(s)	Ukraine	Maryna Aleksiiva; Vladyslava Aleksiiva; Marta Fiedina; Kateryna Reznik; Anastasiya Savchuk; Alina Shynkarenko; Kseniya Sydorenko; Yelyzaveta Yakhno	92.3920
3rd place, bronze medalist(s)	Spain	Ona Carbonell; Berta Ferreras; Meritxell Mas; Alisa Ozhogina; Paula Ramírez; Sara Saldaña; Iris Tió; Blanca Toledano	89.7700
4	Belarus	Vera Butsel; Marharyta Kiryliuk; Hanna Koutsun; Kseniya Kuliashova; Anastasiya Navasiolava; Valeryia Puz; Kseniya Tratseuskaya; Aliaksandra Vysotskaya	84.0494
5	Israel	Eden Blecher; Shelly Bobritsky; Maya Dorf; Noy Gazala; Catherine Kunin; Nikol Nahshonov; Ariel Nassee; Polina Prikazchikova	82.7741
6	Switzerland	Mila Egli; Ilona Fahrni; Emma Grosvenor; Anouk Helfer; Vivienne Koch; Joelle Peschl; Alissa Weibel; Tessa Zollinger	82.3816
7	Great Britain	Isobel Blinkhorn; Millicent Costello; Daisy Gunn; Cerys Larsen; Aimee Lawrence; Daniella Lloyd; Robyn Swatman; Laura Turberville	79.0943
