= Anna Yesipova (swimmer) =

Ukrainian synchronised swimmer

Personal information
- Nationality: Ukrainian
- Born: 27 January 1997 (age 29) Odesa, Ukraine
- Height: 1.70 m (5 ft 7 in)
- Weight: 53 kg (117 lb)

Sport
- Sport: Swimming
- Strokes: Synchronised swimming
Medal record
Women's synchronised swimming
Representing Ukraine
Event	1st	2nd	3rd
European Games	0	0	2
World Junior Championships	0	1	0
European Junior Championships	0	2	0
Total	0	3	2
European Games
Bronze medal – third place	2015 Baku	Team
Bronze medal – third place	2015 Baku	Free routine combination
World Junior Championships
Silver medal – second place	2012 Volos	Free routine combination
European Junior Championships
Silver medal – second place	2013 Poznań	Team routine
Silver medal – second place	2013 Poznań	Free routine combination

Anna Yesipova (Ukrainian: Анна Єсипова; born 27 January 1997 in Odesa, Ukraine) is a Ukrainian synchronised swimmer. She won two bronze medals at the inaugural European Games where she was third in team and combination competitions.
