= Alessia Pezone =

Italian synchronized swimmer

Personal information
- Nationality: Italian
- Born: 23 April 1993 (age 33) Frascati, Italy
- Height: 1.73 m (5 ft 8 in)

Sport
- Country: Italy
- Sport: Synchronised swimming
- Club: Unicusano Aurelia Nuoto
Medal record
World Championships
Silver medal – second place	2019 Gwangju	Highlight routine
European Championships
Silver medal – second place	2018 Glasgow	Free routine combination
Bronze medal – third place	2018 Glasgow	Team free routine
Bronze medal – third place	2018 Glasgow	Team technical routine

Alessia Pezone (born 23 April 1993) is an Italian synchronised swimmer.

== Biography ==
Pezone is an athlete of the Gruppo Sportivo Fiamme Oro. She won a bronze medal in the team free routine competition at the 2018 European Aquatics Championships.
