= Polina Komar =

Russian synchronised swimmer

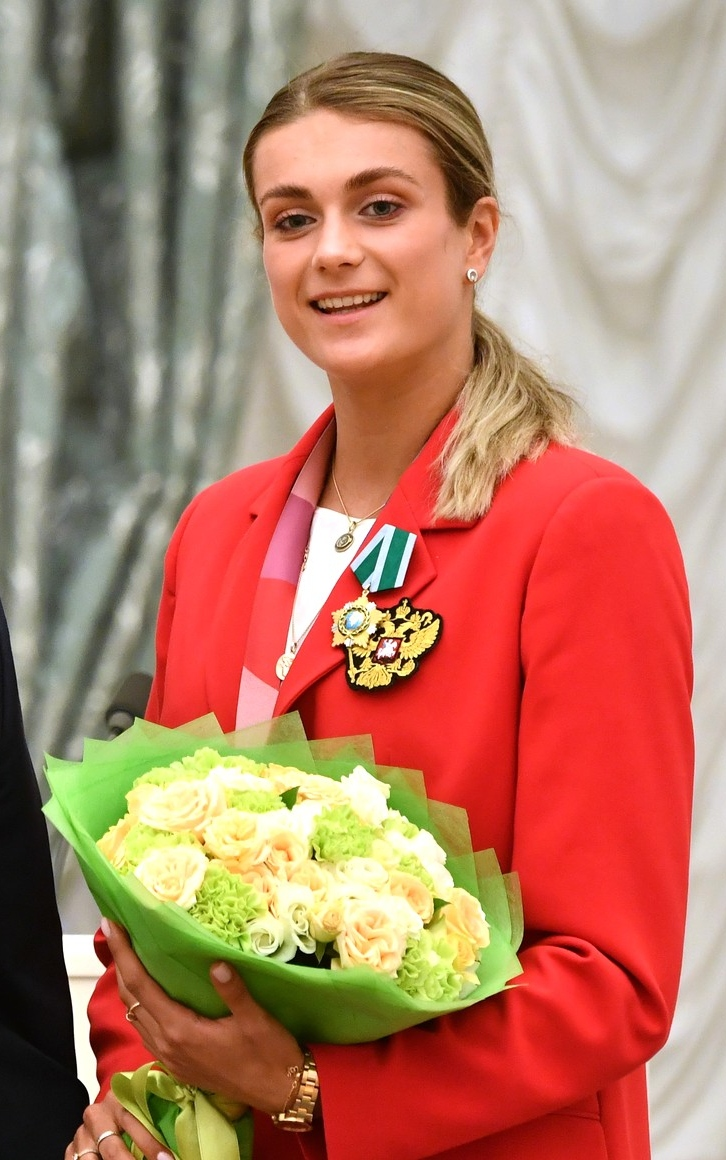
- Komar in 2021

Personal information
- Full name: Polina Dmitryevna Komar
- Nationality: Russian
- Born: 4 November 1999 (age 27) Moscow, Russia
- Education: Russian State University of Physical Education, Sport, Youth and Tourism

Sport
- Country: Russia
- Sport: Synchronised swimming
- Club: MGFSO
- Coached by: Tatiana Pokrovskaya; Elena Gryzunova; Olga Vasilchenko
Medal record
Representing (Russia) ROC
Olympic Games
Gold medal – first place	2020 Tokyo	Team
Representing Russia
World Championships
Gold medal – first place	2017 Budapest	Team technical routine
Gold medal – first place	2017 Budapest	Team free routine
Gold medal – first place	2019 Gwangju	Team technical routine
Gold medal – first place	2019 Gwangju	Team free routine
Gold medal – first place	2019 Gwangju	Free routine combination
European Championships
Gold medal – first place	2018 Glasgow	Team free routine
Gold medal – first place	2018 Glasgow	Team technical routine
Gold medal – first place	2020 Budapest	Team technical routine

Polina Dmitryevna Komar (Russian: Полина Дмитриевна Комар, IPA: [pɐˈlʲinə kɐˈmar]; born 4 November 1999) is a Russian synchronised swimmer. She won team gold medals at the 2020 Olympics, and all world and European championships between 2017 and 2020.
