= Federica Sala =

Italian synchronized swimmer

Personal information
- Nationality: Italian
- Born: 18 July 1993 (age 32) Vimercate, Italy

Sport
- Country: Italy
- Sport: Synchronised swimming
Medal record
Women's artistic swimming
Representing Italy
World Championships
| Silver medal – second place | 2019 Gwangju | Highlight routine |
| Silver medal – second place | 2022 Budapest | Highlight routine |
| Bronze medal – third place | 2022 Budapest | Free routine combination |
European Championships
| Silver medal – second place | 2018 Glasgow | Free routine combination |
| Silver medal – second place | 2022 Rome | Combination routine |
| Silver medal – second place | 2022 Rome | Highlights routine |
| Bronze medal – third place | 2018 Glasgow | Team free routine |
| Bronze medal – third place | 2018 Glasgow | Team technical routine |

Federica Sala (born 18 July 1993) is an Italian synchronised swimmer.

She won a bronze medal in the team free routine competition at the 2018 European Aquatics Championships.
