= Marina Goliadkina =

Russian synchronized swimmer

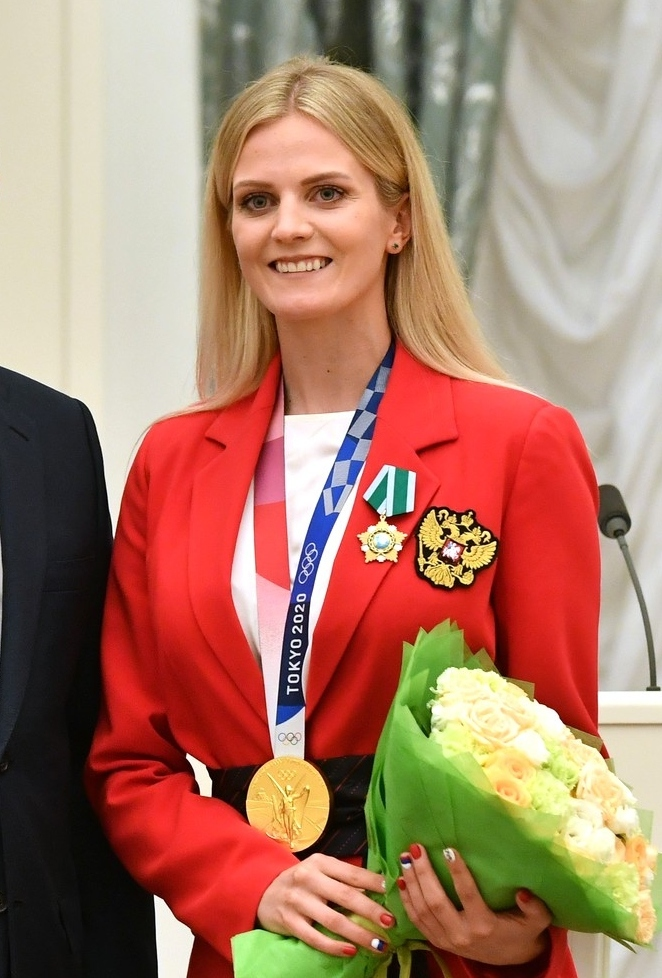
- Goliadkina in 2021

Personal information
- Full name: Marina Sergeevna Goliadkina
- Nationality: Russian
- Born: 13 June 1997 (age 29) Donetsk, Ukraine
- Education: Moscow State Academy of Physical Education
- Height: 1.70 m (5 ft 7 in)
- Weight: 51 kg (112 lb)

Sport
- Country: Russia
- Sport: Synchronised swimming
- Coached by: Tatiana Pokrovskaya; Anastasia Davydova
Medal record
Representing (Russia) ROC
Olympic Games
Gold medal – first place	2020 Tokyo	Team
Representing Russia
World Championships
Gold medal – first place	2017 Budapest	Team technical routine
Gold medal – first place	2017 Budapest	Team free routine
Gold medal – first place	2019 Gwangju	Team technical routine
Gold medal – first place	2019 Gwangju	Team free routine
Gold medal – first place	2019 Gwangju	Free routine combination
European Championships
Gold medal – first place	2016 London	Team technical routine
Gold medal – first place	2016 London	Free routine combination
Gold medal – first place	2018 Glasgow	Team free routine
Gold medal – first place	2018 Glasgow	Team technical routine
Gold medal – first place	2020 Budapest	Team technical routine
Representing Ukraine
World Championships
Bronze medal – third place	2013 Barcelona	Free routine combination

Marina Sergeyevna Goliadkina (Russian: Марина Сергеевна Голядкина [mɐˈrʲinə ɡɐˈlʲatkʲɪnə]; Ukrainian: Марина Сергіївна Голядкіна, romanized: Maryna Serhiivna Holiadkina; born 13 June 1997) is a Ukrainian-born Russian synchronised swimmer. She won team gold medals at the 2020 Summer Olympics, and at all world and European championships between 2017 and 2020.

Goliadkina was born in Donetsk, Ukraine, and between ages two and eight trained in rhythmic gymnastics. She then changed to synchronised swimming, and won a bronze medal at the 2013 World Aquatics Championships. She moved to Russia in August 2014 and received Russian citizenship in 2015.

Goliadkina's elder sister Diana is a 2010 European champion in team modern pentathlon. Their mother is a former Soviet champion in swimming.
