= Daria Bayandina =

Russian synchronised swimmer

Personal information
- Nationality: Russian
- Born: 1 November 1996 (age 29)

Sport
- Country: Russia
- Sport: Synchronised swimming
Medal record
Women's synchronised swimming
Representing Russia
World Championships
Gold medal – first place	2017 Budapest	Team technical routine
Gold medal – first place	2017 Budapest	Team free routine
European Championships
Gold medal – first place	2018 Glasgow	Team free routine
Gold medal – first place	2018 Glasgow	Team technical routine

Daria Bayandina (born 1 November 1996) is a Russian synchronised swimmer.

She won a gold medal in the team free routine competition at the 2018 European Aquatics Championships.
