= Beatrice Callegari =

Italian synchronized swimmer (born 1991)

Personal information
- Nationality: Italian
- Born: 20 December 1991 (age 34) Castelfranco Veneto, Italy
- Height: 1.75 m (5 ft 9 in)
- Weight: 59 kg (130 lb)

Sport
- Sport: Swimming
- Strokes: Synchronised swimming
- Club: Montebelluna; G.S. Marina Militare
Medal record
World Championships
Silver medal – second place	2019 Gwangju	Highlight routine
European Championships
Silver medal – second place	2018 Glasgow	Free routine combination
Bronze medal – third place	2018 Glasgow	Team free routine
Bronze medal – third place	2018 Glasgow	Team technical routine

Beatrice Callegari (born 20 December 1991) is an Italian synchronised swimmer. She competed in the team event at the 2016 Summer Olympics. and in Team at the 2020 Summer Olympics.

Callegari is an athlete of the Gruppo Sportivo della Marina Militare.
