= Synchronised swimming at the 2018 European Aquatics Championships – Solo free routine =

Solo free routine at the 2018 European Aquatics Championships
- Venue: Scotstoun Sports Campus
- Dates: 5 August (preliminary); 7 August (final)
- Competitors: 19 from 19 nations
- Winning points: 94.9333

Medalists
gold medal	Svetlana Kolesnichenko	Russia
silver medal	Linda Cerruti	Italy
bronze medal	Yelyzaveta Yakhno	Ukraine

The Solo free routine competition of the 2018 European Aquatics Championships was held on 5 and 7 August 2018.

== Results ==
The preliminary round was held on 5 August at 09:00. The final was started on 7 August at 13:00.

Green denotes finalists

Rank	Swimmer	Nationality	Preliminary		Final	
Rank	Swimmer	Nationality	Points	Rank	Points	Rank
1st place, gold medalist(s)	Svetlana Kolesnichenko	Russia	95.5333	1	94.9333	1
2nd place, silver medalist(s)	Linda Cerruti	Italy	91.3000	3	92.5000	2
3rd place, bronze medalist(s)	Yelyzaveta Yakhno	Ukraine	92.9333	2	92.1333	3
4	Iris Tió	Spain	89.2667	4	89.6000	4
5	Evangelia Platanioti	Greece	89.0667	5	89.4000	5
6	Eve Planeix	France	86.5000	6	87.3000	6
7	Vasiliki Alexandri	Austria	85.8667	7	86.0333	7
8	Vasilina Khandoshka	Belarus	85.5333	8	85.9333	8
9	Kate Shortman	Great Britain	84.2000	9	84.7333	9
10	Lara Mechnig	Liechtenstein	83.0000	10	83.8000	10
11	Marlene Bojer	Germany	80.9667	12	82.1000	11
12	Vivienne Koch	Switzerland	81.7667	11	81.8000	12
13	Szofi Kiss	Hungary	79.2333	13		
14	Nada Daabousová	Slovakia	78.9333	14		
15	Alžběta Dufková	Czech Republic	78.2667	15		
16	Defne Bakırcı	Turkey	77.8333	16		
17	Aleksandra Atanasova	Bulgaria	75.5333	17		
18	Swietłana Szczepańska	Poland	74.5000	18		
19	Nevena Dimitrijević	Serbia	74.3333	19		
