= Anastasia Arkhipovskaya =

Russian synchronised swimmer

Personal information
- Nationality: Russian
- Born: 19 December 1998 (age 27) Moscow, Russia

Sport
- Country: Russia
- Sport: Synchronised swimming
Medal record
World Championships
Gold medal – first place	2019 Gwangju	Team technical routine
Gold medal – first place	2019 Gwangju	Team free routine
Gold medal – first place	2019 Gwangju	Free routine combination
European Championships
Gold medal – first place	2018 Glasgow	Team free routine
Gold medal – first place	2018 Glasgow	Team technical routine
2015 European Games
Gold medal – first place	2015 Baku	Team
Gold medal – first place	2015 Baku	Free routine combination

Anastasia Arkhipovskaya (born 19 December 1998) is a Russian synchronised swimmer.

She won a gold medal in the team free routine competition at the 2018 European Aquatics Championships.
