= Mayya Gurbanberdieva =

Russian synchronised swimmer (born 1999)

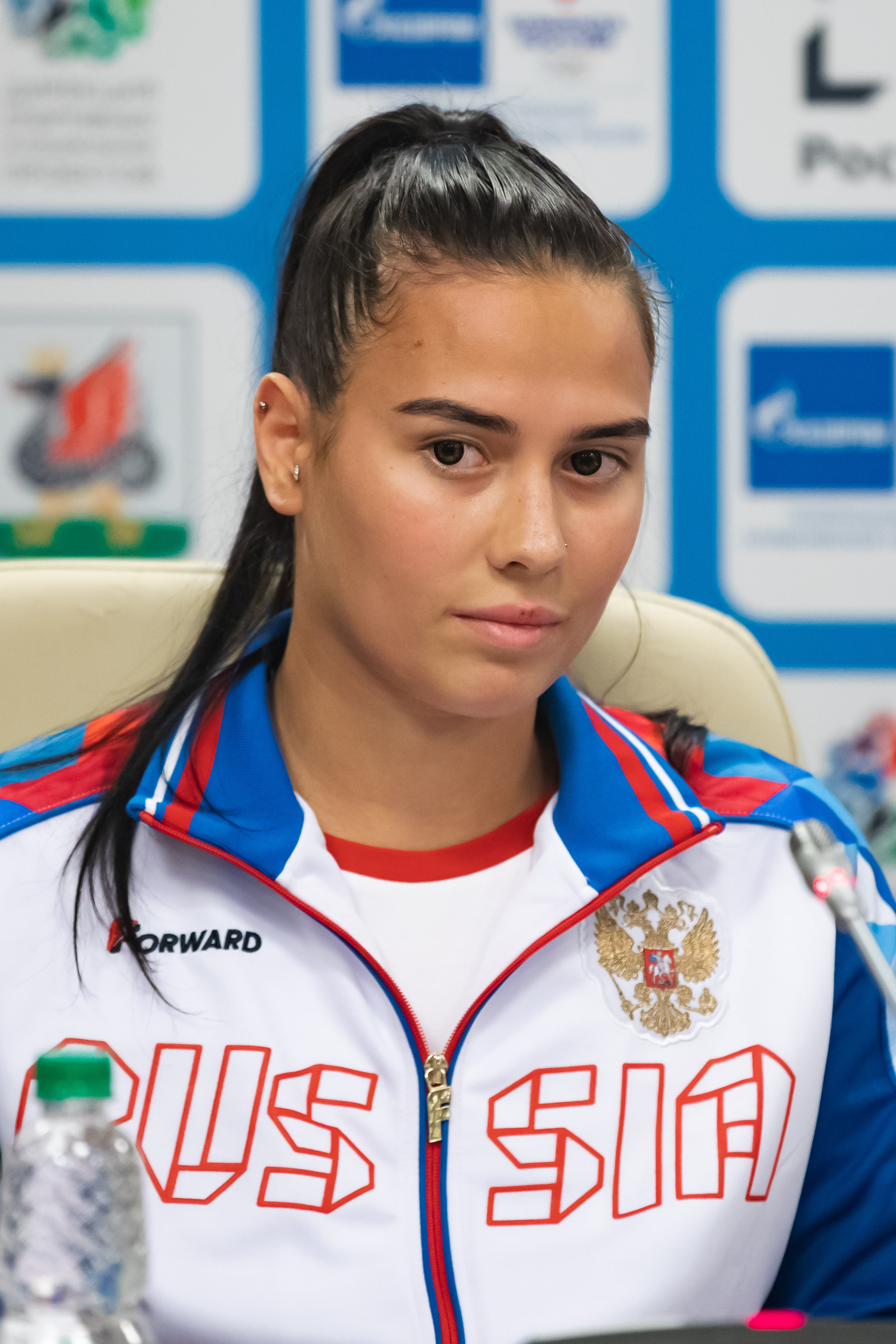
- Gurbanberdieva in 2020

Personal information
- Full name: Mayya Ezizovna Gurbanberdieva
- Born: 9 May 1999 (age 27) Moscow, Russia

Sport
- Country: Russia
- Sport: Synchronised swimming
Medal record
Representing Russia
World Championships
Gold medal – first place	2019 Gwangju	Mixed duet technical
Gold medal – first place	2019 Gwangju	Mixed duet free
European Championships
Gold medal – first place	2018 Glasgow	Mixed free routine
Gold medal – first place	2018 Glasgow	Mixed technical routine
Gold medal – first place	2020 Budapest	Mixed technical routine
European Games
Gold medal – first place	2015 Baku	Team
Gold medal – first place	2015 Baku	Free routine combination
Representing Neutral Athletes B
World Championships
Gold medal – first place	2025 Singapore	Mixed technical routine

Mayya Ezizovna Gurbanberdieva (Russian: Майя Эзизовна Гурбанбердиева; born 9 May 1999) is a Russian synchronised swimmer.

She won a gold medal in the mixed free routine competition at the 2018 European Aquatics Championships.

== Personal life ==
Gurbanberdieva was born on 9 February 1999 in Moscow, Russia. Her father, Eziz Gurbanberdiýew, is from Turkmenistan and works as a news editor at the Channel One Russia television company.
