= Berta Ferreras =

Spanish synchronised swimmer

Personal information
- Full name: Berta Ferreras Sanz
- Nationality: Spanish
- Born: 9 September 1997 (age 28) Mataró, Spain

Sport
- Country: Spain
- Sport: Synchronised swimming
Medal record
Women's artistic swimming
Representing Spain
Event	1st	2nd	3rd
World Championships	0	0	2
European Championships	0	1	4
European Games	2	3	0
Total	2	4	6
World Championships
Bronze medal – third place	2019 Gwangju	Highlight routine
Bronze medal – third place	2022 Budapest	Highlight routine
European Games
Gold medal – first place	2023 Kraków-Małopolska	Team free routine
Gold medal – first place	2023 Kraków-Małopolska	Team technical routine
Silver medal – second place	2015 Baku	Solo
Silver medal – second place	2015 Baku	Team
Silver medal – second place	2015 Baku	Free routine combination
European Championships
Silver medal – second place	2020 Budapest	Team free routine
Bronze medal – third place	2018 Glasgow	Free routine combination
Bronze medal – third place	2018 Glasgow	Mixed free routine
Bronze medal – third place	2018 Glasgow	Mixed technical routine
Bronze medal – third place	2020 Budapest	Team technical routine

Berta Ferreras Sanz (Note: In this Spanish name, the first or paternal surname is Ferreras and the second or maternal family name is Sanz.) (born 9 September 1997) is a Spanish synchronised swimmer.

She won a bronze medal in the free routine combination competition at the 2018 European Aquatics Championships.
