= Veronika Kalinina =

Russian synchronised swimmer

Personal information
- Nationality: Russian
- Born: 19 January 1999 (age 27) Chekhov, Russia

Sport
- Country: Russia
- Sport: Synchronised swimming
Medal record
Women's synchronised swimming
Representing Russia
World Championships
Gold medal – first place	2017 Budapest	Team technical routine
Gold medal – first place	2017 Budapest	Team free routine
Gold medal – first place	2019 Gwangju	Team technical routine
Gold medal – first place	2019 Gwangju	Team free routine
Gold medal – first place	2019 Gwangju	Free routine combination
European Championships
Gold medal – first place	2018 Glasgow	Team free routine
Gold medal – first place	2018 Glasgow	Team technical routine
Gold medal – first place	2020 Budapest	Team technical routine
European Games
Gold medal – first place	2015 Baku	Team
Gold medal – first place	2015 Baku	Free routine combination
World Junior Championships
Gold medal – first place	2016 Kazan	Duet routine

Veronika Kalinina (born 19 January 1999) is a Russian synchronised swimmer.

She won a gold medal in the team free routine competition at the 2018 European Aquatics Championships.
