= Anastasiya Savchuk =

Ukrainian synchronized swimmer

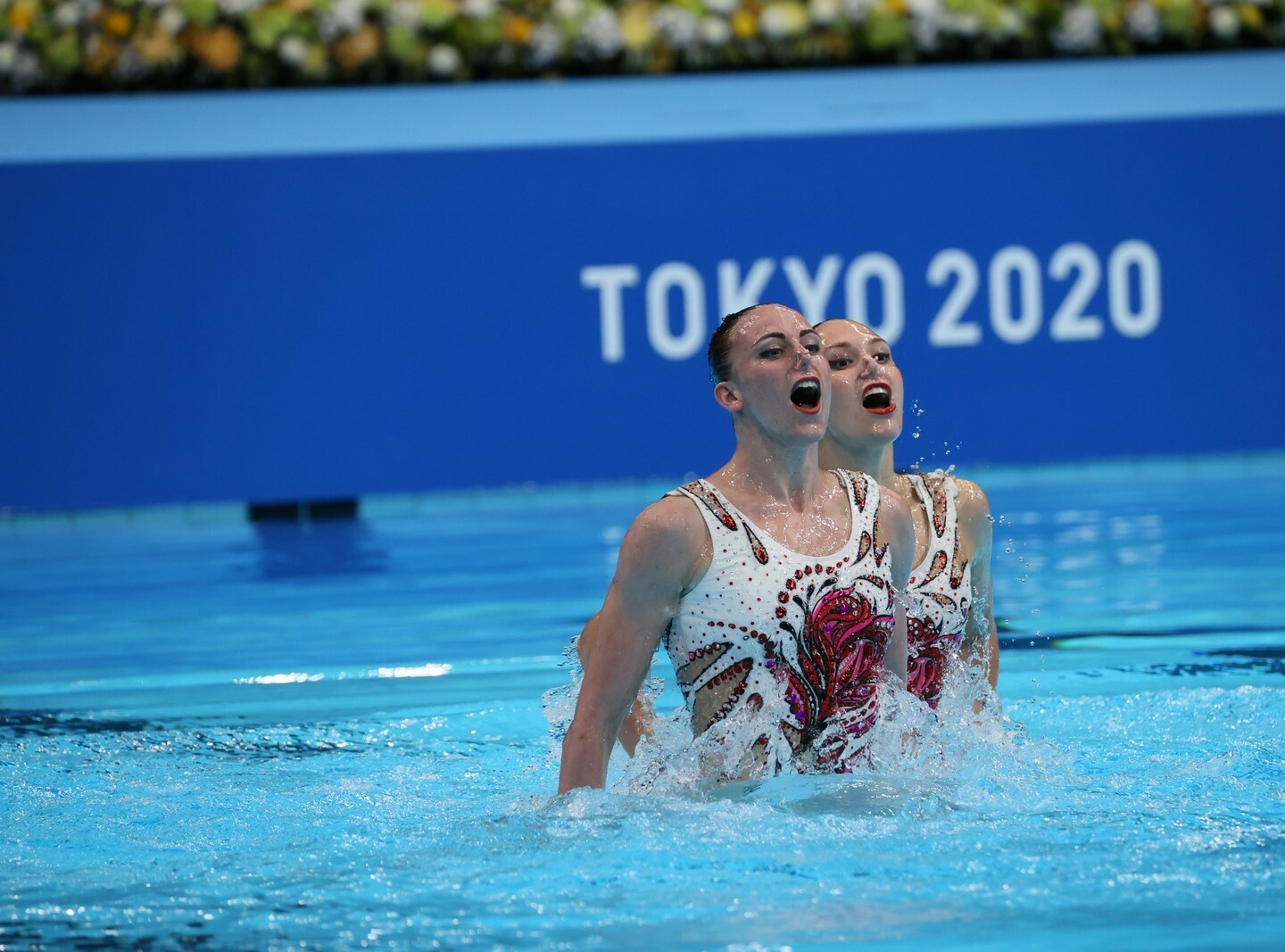
- Savchuk (left) and her duet partner Marta Fiedina at 2020 Summer Olympics

Personal information
- Full name: Anastasiya Hennadiyivna Savchuk
- Born: 2 March 1996 (age 30) Kharkiv, Ukraine
- Height: 1.77 m (5 ft 10 in)
- Weight: 62 kg (137 lb)

Sport
- Country: Ukraine
- Sport: Synchronized swimming
- Club: Dynamo Kharkiv
Medal record
Women's artistic swimming
Representing Ukraine
Event	1st	2nd	3rd
Olympic Games	0	0	2
World Championships	1	1	9
European Championships	6	10	0
World Junior Championships	0	1	2
European Junior Championships	0	5	3
Total	7	17	16
Olympic Games
Bronze medal – third place	2020 Tokyo	Duet
Bronze medal – third place	2020 Tokyo	Team
World Championships
Gold medal – first place	2019 Gwangju	Highlight routine
Silver medal – second place	2017 Budapest	Free routine combination
Bronze medal – third place	2013 Barcelona	Team technical routine
Bronze medal – third place	2013 Barcelona	Team free routine
Bronze medal – third place	2013 Barcelona	Free routine combination
Bronze medal – third place	2017 Budapest	Team free routine
Bronze medal – third place	2019 Gwangju	Duet technical routine
Bronze medal – third place	2019 Gwangju	Duet free routine
Bronze medal – third place	2019 Gwangju	Team technical routine
Bronze medal – third place	2019 Gwangju	Team free routine
Bronze medal – third place	2019 Gwangju	Free routine combination
European Championships
Gold medal – first place	2014 Berlin	Free routine combination
Gold medal – first place	2016 London	Team free routine
Gold medal – first place	2018 Glasgow	Free routine combination
Gold medal – first place	2020 Budapest	Team free routine
Gold medal – first place	2020 Budapest	Combination routine
Gold medal – first place	2020 Budapest	Highlights routine
Silver medal – second place	2014 Berlin	Team routine
Silver medal – second place	2016 London	Team technical routine
Silver medal – second place	2016 London	Free routine combination
Silver medal – second place	2018 Glasgow	Duet free routine
Silver medal – second place	2018 Glasgow	Duet technical routine
Silver medal – second place	2018 Glasgow	Team free routine
Silver medal – second place	2018 Glasgow	Team technical routine
Silver medal – second place	2020 Budapest	Duet technical routine
Silver medal – second place	2020 Budapest	Duet free routine
Silver medal – second place	2020 Budapest	Team technical routine
World Junior Championships
Silver medal – second place	2012 Volos	Free routine combination
Bronze medal – third place	2012 Volos	Duet routine
Bronze medal – third place	2012 Volos	Team routine
European Junior Championships
Silver medal – second place	2011 Belgrade	Duet routine
Silver medal – second place	2013 Poznań	Free routine combination
Silver medal – second place	2013 Poznań	Team routine
Silver medal – second place	2013 Poznań	Duet routine
Silver medal – second place	2013 Poznań	Solo routine
Bronze medal – third place	2011 Belgrade	Free routine combination
Bronze medal – third place	2011 Belgrade	Team routine
Bronze medal – third place	2011 Belgrade	Solo routine

Anastasiya Hennadiyivna Savchuk (Ukrainian: Анастасія Геннадіївна Савчук; born 2 March 1996) is a Ukrainian competitor in synchronized swimming.

She won 3 bronze medals at the 2013 World Aquatics Championships, a silver and a bronze medal at the 2017 World Aquatics Championships and a silver and a gold at the 2014 European Aquatics Championships.

In 2018, Savchuk and Yelyzaveta Yakhno won the silver medal in both the duet technical routine and duet free routine at the 2018 European Aquatics Championships.
