= Oleksandra Kovalenko =

Ukrainian synchronised swimmer

Personal information
- Nationality: Ukrainian
- Born: 2 May 2001 (age 25) Kharkiv, Ukraine

Sport
- Sport: Swimming
- Strokes: Synchronised swimming
Medal record
Women's synchronised swimming
Representing Ukraine
Event	1st	2nd	3rd
World Championships	1	0	1
European Championships	0	1	0
World Junior Championships	0	0	1
European Junior Championships	0	5	0
Total	1	6	2
World Championships
Gold medal – first place	2019 Gwangju	Highlight routine
Bronze medal – third place	2019 Gwangju	Free routine combination
European Championships
Silver medal – second place	2018 Glasgow	Team technical routine
World Junior Championships
Bronze medal – third place	2016 Kazan	Team routine
European Junior Championships
Silver medal – second place	2016 Rijeka	Team routine
Silver medal – second place	2016 Rijeka	Free routine combination
Silver medal – second place	2017 Belgrade	Duet routine
Silver medal – second place	2017 Belgrade	Team routine
Silver medal – second place	2017 Belgrade	Free routine combination

Oleksandra Kovalenko (Ukrainian: Олександра Коваленко; born 2 May 2001) is a Ukrainian synchronised swimmer. She is a World Champion as well as European Championships medalist.
