= 2012 FINA World Junior Synchronised Swimming Championships =

International synchronised swimming competition

The 13th FINA World Junior Synchronised Swimming Championships was held September 12–16, 2012 in Volos, Greece. The synchronised swimmers are aged between 15 and 18 years old, from 33 nations, swimming in four events: Solo, Duet, Team and Free combination.

== Participating nations ==
33 nations swam at the 2012 World Junior Championships were:

- Argentina
- Austria
- Belarus
- Brazil
- Canada
- China
- Colombia
- Croatia
- Czech Republic
- Egypt
- Finland
- France
- Germany
- Great Britain
- Greece
- Hungary
- Israel
- Italy
- Japan
- Kazakhstan
- Mexico
- Netherlands
- New Zealand
- Peru
- Russia
- Serbia
- Singapore
- Slovakia
- Spain
- Switzerland
- Ukraine
- USA
- Venezuela

== Results ==
Event	Gold		Silver		Bronze	
Solo details	Vlada Chigireva; Russia	170.9870	Hikaru Kazumori; Japan	163.4881	Jacqueline Simoneau; Canada	162.4059
Duet details	Milena Miteva; Elena Prokofyeva; Russia	168.5908	Hikaru Kazumori; Momoka Tamura; Japan	162.7664	Kateryna Reznik; Anastasiya Savchuk; Ukraine	160.5239
Team details	Russia	168.1266	Japan	160.6472	Ukraine	159.5809
Free combination details	Russia	91.6100	Ukraine	88.9000	Spain	87.3600
