= Alina Shynkarenko =

Ukrainian synchronised swimmer

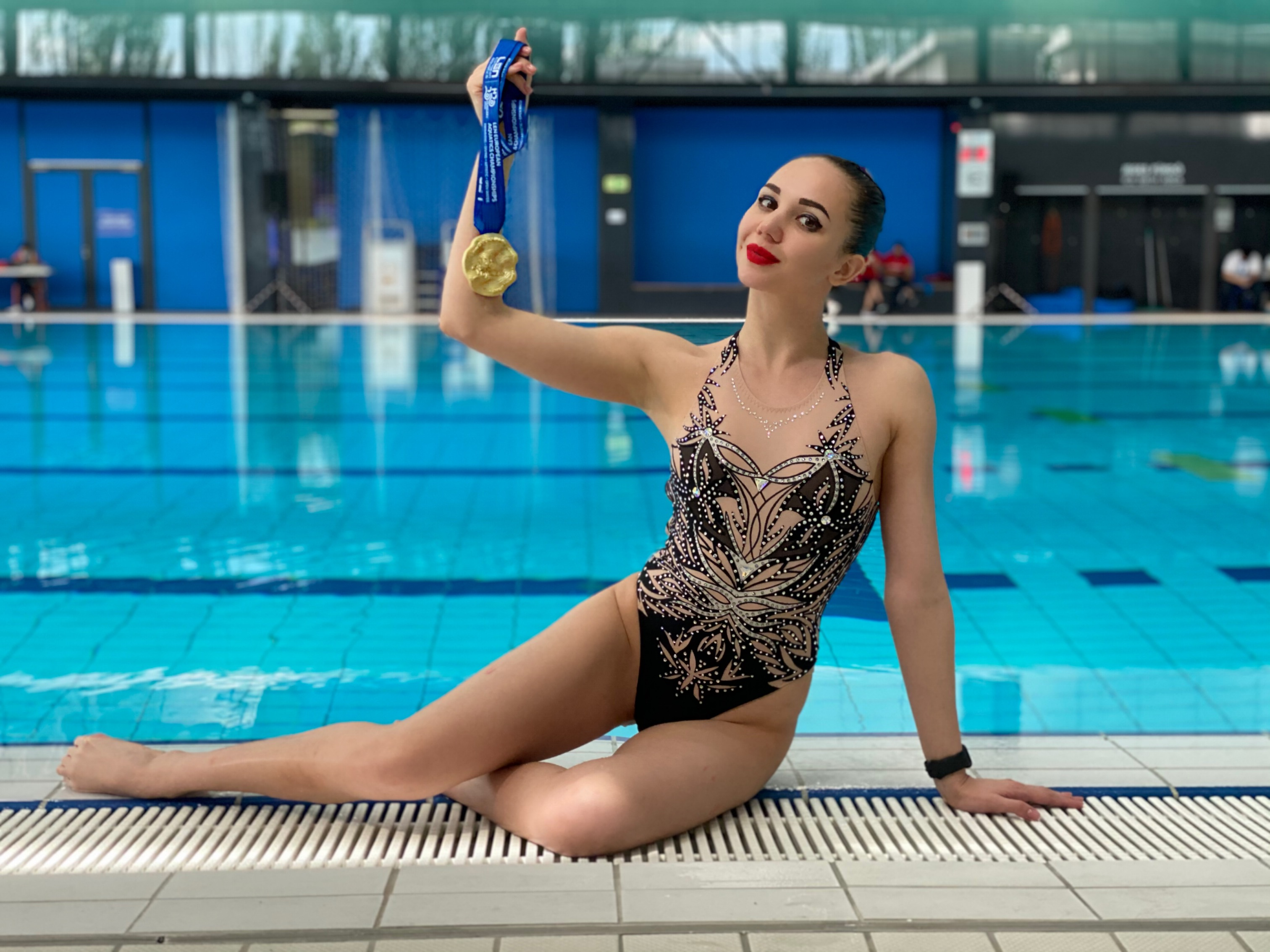
- Shynkarenko in 2021

Personal information
- Nationality: Ukrainian
- Born: 14 November 1998 (age 27) Donetsk, Ukraine

Sport
- Sport: Swimming
- Strokes: Synchronised swimming
Medal record
Women's synchronised swimming
Representing Ukraine
Event	1st	2nd	3rd
Olympic Games	0	0	1
World Championships	1	1	3
European Championships	4	3	0
European Games	0	0	2
World Junior Championships	0	0	1
European Junior Championships	0	2	0
Total	5	6	7
Olympic Games
Bronze medal – third place	2020 Tokyo	Team
World Championships
Gold medal – first place	2019 Gwangju	Highlight routine
Silver medal – second place	2017 Budapest	Free routine combination
Bronze medal – third place	2019 Gwangju	Team technical routine
Bronze medal – third place	2019 Gwangju	Team free routine
Bronze medal – third place	2019 Gwangju	Free routine combination
European Championships
Gold medal – first place	2018 Glasgow	Free routine combination
Gold medal – first place	2020 Budapest	Team free routine
Gold medal – first place	2020 Budapest	Combination routine
Gold medal – first place	2020 Budapest	Highlights routine
Silver medal – second place	2018 Glasgow	Team free routine
Silver medal – second place	2018 Glasgow	Team technical routine
Silver medal – second place	2020 Budapest	Team technical routine
European Games
Bronze medal – third place	2015 Baku	Team
Bronze medal – third place	2015 Baku	Free routine combination
World Junior Championships
Bronze medal – third place	2016 Kazan	Team routine
European Junior Championships
Silver medal – second place	2016 Rijeka	Free routine combination
Silver medal – second place	2016 Rijeka	Team routine

Alina Vitaliyivna Shynkarenko (Ukrainian: Аліна Віталіївна Шинкаренко; born 14 November 1998) is a Ukrainian synchronised swimmer. She is World Championships medalist.

== Career ==
Shynkarenko won two bronze medals at the inaugural European Games where she was third in team and combination competitions.

At the 2017 World Aquatics Championships Shynkarenko won silver in the combination event.
