= 2016 FINA World Junior Synchronised Swimming Championships =

International synchronised swimming competition

15th FINA World Junior Synchronised Swimming Championships
- Host city: Kazan, Russia
- Date: 9–13 July
- Venue: Palace of Water Sports

The 15th FINA World Junior Synchronised Swimming Championships was held from 9 to 13 July 2022 at the Palace of Water Sports in Kazan, Russia. It was the last edition of the championships to use synchronized swimming in the name of the event before the change of the name of the sport to artistic swimming in 2017.

== Results ==
Event	Gold		Silver		Bronze	
Solo figures	Varvara Subbotina; Russia	82.0856	Daria Kulagina; Russia	80.0833	Irene Toledano; Spain	79.5878
Solo	Varvara Subbotina; Russia	173.9189	Yelyzaveta Yakhno; Ukraine	169.3473	Irene Toledano; Spain	167.1878
Duet	Russia; Veronika Kalinina; Daria Kulagina; Varvara Subbotina^{[a]}	170.7455	Ukraine; Yana Nariezhna; Yelyzaveta Yakhno; Vladyslava Aleksiyiva^{[a]}	165.9185	Japan; Kirara Oya; Mashiro Yasunaga; Sakiko Akutsu^{[a]}	165.7798
Team	Russia	170.8215	Japan	166.5645	Ukraine	165.6804
Team free combination	Russia	91.9333	China	91.2333	Japan	89.3333

^{a} Individual was a reserve competitor.

== Medal table ==
* Host nation (Russia)

Rank	Nation	Gold	Silver	Bronze	Total
1	Russia	5	1	0	6
2	Ukraine	0	2	1	3
3	Japan	0	1	2	3
4	China	0	1	0	1
5	Spain	0	0	2	2
Totals (5 entries)		5	5	5	15
