= Yana Nariezhna =

Ukrainian synchronised swimmer

Personal information
- Nationality: Ukrainian
- Born: 5 July 1999 (age 26) Kharkiv, Ukraine

Sport
- Sport: Swimming
- Strokes: Synchronised swimming
Medal record
Women's synchronised swimming
Representing Ukraine
Event	1st	2nd	3rd
World Championships	1	1	3
European Championships	1	2	0
European Games	0	0	3
World Junior Championships	0	1	1
European Junior Championships	0	3	0
Total	2	7	7
World Championships
Gold medal – first place	2019 Gwangju	Highlight routine
Silver medal – second place	2017 Budapest	Free routine combination
Bronze medal – third place	2019 Gwangju	Team technical routine
Bronze medal – third place	2019 Gwangju	Team free routine
Bronze medal – third place	2019 Gwangju	Free routine combination
European Championships
Gold medal – first place	2018 Glasgow	Free routine combination
Silver medal – second place	2018 Glasgow	Team free routine
Silver medal – second place	2018 Glasgow	Team technical routine
European Games
Bronze medal – third place	2015 Baku	Duet
Bronze medal – third place	2015 Baku	Team
Bronze medal – third place	2015 Baku	Free routine combination
World Junior Championships
Silver medal – second place	2016 Kazan	Duet routine
Bronze medal – third place	2016 Kazan	Team routine
European Junior Championships
Silver medal – second place	2016 Rijeka	Team routine
Silver medal – second place	2016 Rijeka	Duet routine
Silver medal – second place	2016 Rijeka	Free routine combination

Yana Nariezhna (Ukrainian: Яна Наріжна; born 29 August 1999) is a Ukrainian synchronised swimmer. She is World Championships medalist.

== Career ==
Nariezhna won three bronze medals at the inaugural European Games where she was third in duet, team and combination competitions.

At the 2017 World Aquatics Championships Nariezhna won silver in the combination event.
