= Valeriia Aprielieva =

Ukrainian synchronised swimmer

Personal information
- Nationality: Ukrainian
- Born: 1 February 1997 (age 29) Kharkiv oblast, Ukraine

Sport
- Sport: Swimming
- Strokes: Synchronised swimming
Medal record
Women's synchronized swimming
Representing Ukraine
Event	1st	2nd	3rd
World Championships	1	1	2
European Championships	1	1	0
European Games	0	0	2
World Junior Championships	0	1	0
European Junior Championships	0	2	0
Total	2	5	4
World Championships
Gold medal – first place	2019 Gwangju	Highlight routine
Silver medal – second place	2017 Budapest	Free routine combination
Bronze medal – third place	2017 Budapest	Team free routine
Bronze medal – third place	2019 Gwangju	Free routine combination
European Championships
Gold medal – first place	2018 Glasgow	Free routine combination
Silver medal – second place	2018 Glasgow	Team free routine
European Games
Bronze medal – third place	2015 Baku	Team
Bronze medal – third place	2015 Baku	Free routine combination
World Junior Championships
Silver medal – second place	2012 Volos	Free routine combination
European Junior Championships
Silver medal – second place	2013 Poznań	Team routine
Silver medal – second place	2013 Poznań	Free routine combination

Valeriia Aprielieva (Ukrainian: Валерія Апрелєва; born 1 February 1997) is a Ukrainian synchronised swimmer. She is World Championships medalist.

== Career ==
Aprielieva won two bronze medals at the inaugural European Games where she was third in team and combination competitions.

At the 2017 World Aquatics Championships Aprielieva won a bronze medal in team free routine. The next day she won silver in the combination event.
