= Yelyzaveta Yakhno =

Ukrainian synchronised swimmer

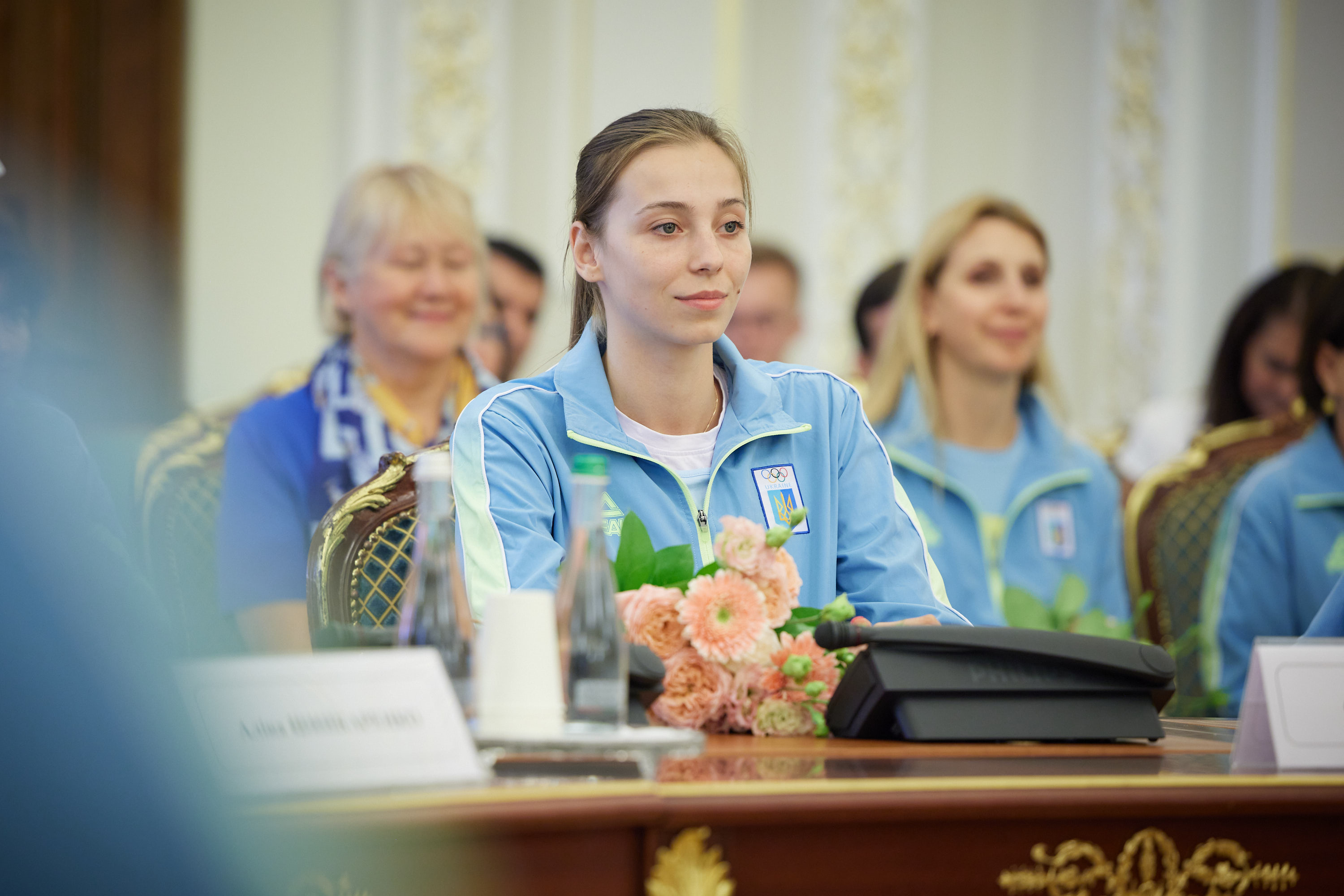
- Yakhno in 2021

Personal information
- Nationality: Ukrainian
- Born: 4 June 1998 (age 28) Donetsk, Ukraine

Sport
- Sport: Swimming
- Strokes: Synchronised swimming
Medal record
Women's synchronized swimming
Representing Ukraine
Event	1st	2nd	3rd
Olympic Games	0	0	1
World Championships	1	1	6
European Championships	4	6	1
European Games	0	0	3
World Junior Championships	0	2	1
European Junior Championships	0	4	0
Total	5	13	12
Olympic Games
Bronze medal – third place	2020 Tokyo	Team
World Championships
Gold medal – first place	2019 Gwangju	Highlight routine
Silver medal – second place	2017 Budapest	Free routine combination
Bronze medal – third place	2017 Budapest	Duet technical routine
Bronze medal – third place	2017 Budapest	Duet free routine
Bronze medal – third place	2017 Budapest	Team free routine
Bronze medal – third place	2019 Gwangju	Team technical routine
Bronze medal – third place	2019 Gwangju	Team free routine
Bronze medal – third place	2019 Gwangju	Free routine combination
European Championships
Gold medal – first place	2018 Glasgow	Free routine combination
Gold medal – first place	2020 Budapest	Team free routine
Gold medal – first place	2020 Budapest	Combination routine
Gold medal – first place	2020 Budapest	Highlights routine
Silver medal – second place	2018 Glasgow	Solo technical routine
Silver medal – second place	2018 Glasgow	Duet free routine
Silver medal – second place	2018 Glasgow	Duet technical routine
Silver medal – second place	2018 Glasgow	Team free routine
Silver medal – second place	2018 Glasgow	Team technical routine
Silver medal – second place	2020 Budapest	Team technical routine
Bronze medal – third place	2018 Glasgow	Solo free routine
European Games
Bronze medal – third place	2015 Baku	Duet
Bronze medal – third place	2015 Baku	Team
Bronze medal – third place	2015 Baku	Free routine combination
World Junior Championships
Silver medal – second place	2016 Kazan	Solo routine
Silver medal – second place	2016 Kazan	Duet routine
Bronze medal – third place	2016 Kazan	Team routine
European Junior Championships
Silver medal – second place	2016 Rijeka	Team routine
Silver medal – second place	2016 Rijeka	Duet routine
Silver medal – second place	2016 Rijeka	Solo routine
Silver medal – second place	2016 Rijeka	Free routine combination

Yelyzaveta Serhiivna Yakhno (Ukrainian: Єлизавета Сергіївна Яхно; born 4 June 1998) is a Ukrainian synchronised swimmer. She is World Championships medalist.

== Career ==
Yakhno won three bronze medals at the inaugural European Games where she was third in duet, team and combination competitions.

At the 2017 World Aquatics Championships Yakhno in pair with outstanding Ukrainian synchro swimmer Anna Voloshyna won a bronze medal in duet technical routine which became her first major international achievement. Later she repeated her success in duet free routine. She also finished third in team free routine. The next day she won silver in the combination event.

In 2018, Yakhno and Anastasiya Savchuk won the silver medal in both the duet technical routine and duet free routine at the 2018 European Aquatics Championships.

In the 2020 Summer Olympics, she won bronze as part of the artistic swimming team competition.

After the Russian invasion of Ukraine began, she left Ukraine and accepted an assistant coach position offer from Canada Artistic Swimming. She is currently staying in Montreal.
