= Daria Kulagina =

Belarusian synchronized swimmer

Personal information
- Nationality: Belarus
- Born: 3 March 1999 (age 27) Moscow, Russia
- Height: 1.68 m (5 ft 6 in)

Sport
- Sport: Synchronized swimming
- Event: Women's duet
Medal record
Women's synchronised swimming
Representing Russia
World Junior Championships
Gold medal – first place	2016 Kazan	Duet routine
Silver medal – second place	2016 Kazan	Solo figures

Daria Kulagina (born 3 March 1999) is a Belarusian synchronized swimmer. She competed in the 2020 Summer Olympics.
