= Artistic swimming at the 2022 Asian Games =

- Venue: Hangzhou Olympic Expo Aquatics Center
- Dates: 6–8 October 2023
- Competitors: 84 from 10 nations

Artistic swimming at the 2022 Asian Games was held at the Hangzhou Olympic Expo Aquatics Center in Hangzhou, China from 6 to 8 October 2023.

On 7 October 2022, World Aquatics (then FINA) voted to amend its rules to allow up to two male athletes to participate in the team event. However, only two male swimmers from China and Thailand participated in the games.

== Schedule ==
A	Acrobatic routine	T	Technical routine	F	Free routine

Event↓/Date →	6th Fri	7th Sat	8th Sun
Women's duet	T	F	
Team	A	T	F

== Medalists ==
Event	Gold	Silver	Bronze
Duet	China; Wang Liuyi; Wang Qianyi	Japan; Moe Higa; Tomoka Sato; Mashiro Yasunaga	Kazakhstan; Arina Pushkina; Yasmin Tuyakova
Team	China; Chang Hao; Cheng Wentao; Feng Yu; Shi Haoyu; Wang Ciyue; Wang Liuyi; Wang Qianyi; Xiang Binxuan; Xiao Yanning; Zhang Yayi	Japan; Moka Fujii; Moe Higa; Moeka Kijima; Tomoka Sato; Ayano Shimada; Ami Wada; Akane Yanagisawa; Mashiro Yasunaga; Megumu Yoshida	Kazakhstan; Nargiza Bolatova; Eteri Kakutia; Aigerim Kurmangaliyeva; Xeniya Makarova; Arina Myasnikova; Anna Pavletsova; Arina Pushkina; Yasmin Tuyakova; Zhaklin Yakimova; Zhaniya Zhiyengazy

== Medal table ==
Rank	Nation	Gold	Silver	Bronze	Total
1	China (CHN)	2	0	0	2
2	Japan (JPN)	0	2	0	2
3	Kazakhstan (KAZ)	0	0	2	2
Totals (3 entries)		2	2	2	6

== Participating nations ==
A total of 84 athletes from 10 nations competed in artistic swimming at the 2022 Asian Games:

- China (10)
- Hong Kong (10)
- Japan (9)
- Kazakhstan (10)
- Macau (10)
- North Korea (10)
- Singapore (10)
- South Korea (2)
- Thailand (10)
- Uzbekistan (3)
