= Artistic swimming at the 2023 World Aquatics Championships – Women's duet technical routine =

Women's duet technical routine at the 2023 World Aquatics Championships
- Venue: Marine Messe Fukuoka
- Location: Fukuoka, Japan
- Dates: 14 July (preliminary); 16 July (final)
- Competitors: 76 from 38 nations
- Teams: 38
- Winning points: 273.9500

Medalists
| gold medal | Moe Higa; Mashiro Yasunaga | Japan |
| silver medal | Linda Cerruti; Lucrezia Ruggiero | Italy |
| bronze medal | Alisa Ozhogina; Iris Tió | Spain |

The women's duet technical routine was an artistic swimming competition at the 2023 World Aquatics Championships was held on 14 and 16 July 2023.

== Results ==
The preliminary round was started on 14 July at 15:42. The final was held on 16 July at 19:30.

Green denotes finalists

| Rank | Swimmers | Nationality | Preliminary | | Final | |
| Rank | Swimmers | Nationality | Points | Rank | Points | Rank |
|---|---|---|---|---|---|---|
| 1st place, gold medalist(s) | Moe Higa; Mashiro Yasunaga | Japan | 215.2700 | 12 | 273.9500 | 1 |
| 2nd place, silver medalist(s) | Linda Cerruti; Lucrezia Ruggiero | Italy | 234.2667 | 8 | 263.0334 | 2 |
| 3rd place, bronze medalist(s) | Alisa Ozhogina; Iris Tió | Spain | 228.7059 | 9 | 257.8368 | 3 |
| 4 | Wang Liuyi; Wang Qianyi | China | 280.3334 | 1 | 249.4099 | 4 |
| 5 | Anna-Maria Alexandri; Eirini-Marina Alexandri | Austria | 275.3233 | 2 | 240.5117 | 5 |
| 6 | Sofia Malkogeorgou; Evangelia Platanioti | Greece | 236.1667 | 7 | 238.4784 | 6 |
| 7 | Bregje de Brouwer; Noortje de Brouwer | Netherlands | 259.9635 | 4 | 231.7799 | 7 |
| 8 | Kate Shortman; Isabelle Thorpe | Great Britain | 226.9067 | 10 | 228.3801 | 8 |
| 9 | Nuria Diosdado; Joana Jiménez | Mexico | 244.2000 | 6 | 222.5667 | 9 |
| 10 | Maryna Aleksiiva; Vladyslava Aleksiiva | Ukraine | 274.1934 | 3 | 213.1599 | 10 |
| 11 | Maria Gonçalves; Cheila Vieira | Portugal | 217.5866 | 11 | 208.4600 | 11 |
| 12 | Shelly Bobritsky; Ariel Nassee | Israel | 248.7284 | 5 | 182.7332 | 12 |
| 13 | Hur Yoon-seo; Lee Ri-young | South Korea | 204.8133 | 13 | Did not advance | |
| 14 | Noemi Büchel; Leila Marxer | Liechtenstein | 204.5567 | 14 | Did not advance | |
| 15 | Laura Miccuci; Gabriela Regly | Brazil | 203.9234 | 15 | Did not advance | |
| 16 | Melisa Ceballos; Estefanía Roa | Colombia | 196.2966 | 16 | Did not advance | |
| 17 | Megumi Field; Ruby Remati | United States | 196.0066 | 17 | Did not advance | |
| 18 | Scarlett Finn; Kenzie Priddell | Canada | 192.0200 | 18 | Did not advance | |
| 19 | Carolyn Buckle; Kiera Gazzard | Australia | 189.6634 | 19 | Did not advance | |
| 20 | Chiara Diky; Lea Anna Krajčovičová | Slovakia | 186.5100 | 20 | Did not advance | |
| 21 | Arina Pushkina; Yasmin Tuyakova | Kazakhstan | 184.2734 | 21 | Did not advance | |
| 22 | Karolína Klusková; Aneta Mrázková | Czech Republic | 183.8601 | 22 | Did not advance | |
| 23 | Diana Onkes; Ziyodakhon Toshkhujaeva | Uzbekistan | 182.8649 | 23 | Did not advance | |
| 24 | Hana Hiekal; Malak Toson | Egypt | 179.0300 | 24 | Did not advance | |
| 25 | Debbie Soh; Miya Yong | Singapore | 176.5883 | 25 | Did not advance | |
| 26 | Pongpimporn Pongsuwan; Supitchaya Songpan | Thailand | 175.2599 | 26 | Did not advance | |
| 27 | Blanka Barbócz; Angelika Bastianelli | Hungary | 173.8016 | 27 | Did not advance | |
| 28 | Isidora Letelier; Rocío Vargas | Chile | 172.4133 | 28 | Did not advance | |
| 29 | Sasha Miteva; Dalia Penkova | Bulgaria | 168.6933 | 29 | Did not advance | |
| 30 | Tiziana Bonucci; Luisina Caussi | Argentina | 167.4149 | 30 | Did not advance | |
| 31 | Kyra Hoevertsz; Mikayla Morales | Aruba | 165.2667 | 31 | Did not advance | |
| 32 | Nil Talu; Esmanur Yirmibeş | Turkey | 163.6001 | 32 | Did not advance | |
| 33 | Andrea Maroto; Raquel Zúñiga | Costa Rica | 159.2233 | 33 | Did not advance | |
| 34 | Eva Morris; Eden Worsley | New Zealand | 157.3483 | 34 | Did not advance | |
| 35 | Gabriela Alpajón; Dayaris Varona | Cuba | 156.8600 | 35 | Did not advance | |
| 36 | Agustina Medina; Lucía Pérez | Uruguay | 153.1900 | 36 | Did not advance | |
| 37 | Ao Weng I Chau Cheng Han | Macau | 152.1800 | 37 | Did not advance | |
| 38 | Jess Pretorius; Laura Strugnell | South Africa | 126.7933 | 38 | Did not advance | |
