= Artistic swimming at the 2024 Summer Olympics – Qualification =

This article details the qualifying phase for artistic swimming at the 2024 Summer Olympics. The competition at these Games comprised a total of 96 artistic swimmers coming from their respective National Olympic Committees (NOCs); each was allowed to enter a maximum of eight members (including two men) if qualified for the open team, and a maximum of two artistic swimmers competing in the women's duet. NOCs could select two of the qualified team members to compete in the women's duet. Host nation France reserved an eight-member team across all events as Europe's continental representative.

For the team event, the highest-ranked NOC in each of the five continental meets, except for the host nation France (representing Europe), obtained a quota place, while the remaining NOCs competed for the five available spots at the 2024 World Aquatics Championships. For the duet, the highest-ranked NOC from each of the five continental meets that did not have a qualified team received a spot, with the remaining NOCs competing for the three remaining spots through the 2024 Worlds. All ten NOCs eligible to compete in the team event were required to select two members to form a duet.

== Timeline ==
Event	Date	Venue
2023 European Games	June 21–25, 2023	(Poland) Kraków-Małopolska
Oceania Continental Selection	July 14–22, 2023	(Japan) Fukuoka
2022 Asian Games	October 6–8, 2023	(China) Hangzhou
2023 Pan American Games	October 31–November 3, 2023	(Chile) Santiago
African Continental Selection	February 2–10, 2024	(Qatar) Doha
2024 World Aquatics Championships	February 2–10, 2024	(Qatar) Doha

== Qualification summary ==
Nation	Team	Duet	Athletes
Australia	Yes	Yes	8
Austria	—	Yes	2
Canada	Yes	Yes	8
China	Yes	Yes	8
Egypt	Yes	Yes	8
France	Yes	Yes	8
Great Britain	—	Yes	2
Greece	—	Yes	2
Italy	Yes	Yes	8
Israel	—	Yes	2
Japan	Yes	Yes	8
South Korea	—	Yes	2
Mexico	Yes	Yes	8
Netherlands	—	Yes	2
New Zealand	—	Yes	2
Spain	Yes	Yes	8
Ukraine	—	Yes	2
United States	Yes	Yes	8
Total: 18 NOCs	80	16	96

== Open team ==
Event	Place	Qualified team
Host nation	1	France
African Continental Selection	1	Egypt
Oceania Continental Selection	1	Australia
2022 Asian Games	1	China
2023 Pan American Games	1	Mexico
2024 World Aquatics Championships	5	United States; Spain; Japan; Italy; Canada
Total	10	

== Women's duet ==
Event	Place	Qualified NOC
Qualified for the team event	10	Australia; Canada; China; Egypt; France; Italy; Japan; Mexico; Spain; United States
2023 European Games	1	Austria
African Continental Selection	~~1~~ (Note: Egypt, Japan and United States qualified through team event and therefore their women's duet quota spots will be allocated to the 2024 World Aquatics Championships pathway.)	—
Oceania Continental Selection	1	New Zealand
2022 Asian Games	~~1~~	—
2023 Pan American Games	~~1~~	—
2024 World Aquatics Championships	6	Great Britain; Netherlands; Greece; Israel; Ukraine; South Korea
Total	18	
