= Artistic swimming at the 2023 World Aquatics Championships – Women's duet free routine =

Women's duet free routine at the 2023 World Aquatics Championships
- Venue: Marine Messe Fukuoka
- Location: Fukuoka, Japan
- Dates: 18 July (preliminary); 20 July (final)
- Competitors: 72 from 36 nations
- Teams: 36
- Winning points: 255.4583

Medalists
gold medal	Anna-Maria Alexandri; Eirini-Marina Alexandri	Austria
silver medal	Wang Liuyi; Wang Qianyi	China
bronze medal	Moe Higa; Mashiro Yasunaga	Japan

The women's duet free routine was an artistic swimming competition at the 2023 World Aquatics Championships was held on 18 and 20 July 2023.

== Results ==
The preliminary round was started on 18 July at 09:00. The final was held on 20 July at 19:30.

Green denotes finalists

Rank	Swimmers	Nationality	Preliminary		Final	
Rank	Swimmers	Nationality	Points	Rank	Points	Rank
1st place, gold medalist(s)	Anna-Maria Alexandri; Eirini-Marina Alexandri	Austria	251.4313	1	255.4583	1
2nd place, silver medalist(s)	Wang Liuyi; Wang Qianyi	China	184.7208	9	255.2480	2
3rd place, bronze medalist(s)	Mashiro Yasunaga; Moe Higa	Japan	178.1583	11	249.5167	3
4	Shelly Bobritsky; Ariel Nassee	Israel	225.1625	4	236.1334	4
5	Isabelle Thorpe; Kate Shortman	Great Britain	184.6145	10	226.4834	5
6	Vladyslava Aleksiyiva; Maryna Aleksiyiva	Ukraine	251.0981	2	224.6375	6
7	Megumi Field; Ruby Remati	United States	225.9459	3	209.5187	7
8	Marloes Steenbeek; Bregje de Brouwer	Netherlands	217.6916	6	206.0396	8
9	Lucrezia Ruggiero; Linda Cerruti	Italy	213.6813	7	200.0751	9
10	Sofia Malkogeorgou; Evangelia Platanioti	Greece	173.0249	12	189.4291	10
11	Iris Tió; Alisa Ozhogina	Spain	223.1792	5	175.7437	11
12	Anastasia Bayandina; Eve Planeix	France	193.7375	8	170.0542	12
13	Lee Ri-young; Hur Yoon-seo	South Korea	169.6645	13	Did not advance	
14	Leila Marxer; Noemi Büchel	Liechtenstein	168.4124	14	Did not advance	
15	Cheila Vieira; Maria Gonçalves	Portugal	167.1750	15	Did not advance	
16	Laura Miccuci; Gabriela Regly	Brazil	165.2500	16	Did not advance	
17	Ziyodakhon Toshkhujaeva; Diana Onkes	Uzbekistan	159.7541	17	Did not advance	
18	Susana Rovner; Klara Bleyer	Germany	148.8394	18	Did not advance	
19	Estefanía Roa; Melisa Ceballos	Colombia	145.4605	19	Did not advance	
20	Hana Hiekal; Malak Toson	Egypt	144.0021	20	Did not advance	
21	Yasmin Tuyakova; Arina Pushkina	Kazakhstan	141.8146	21	Did not advance	
22	Zoe Poulis; Georgia Courage-Gardiner	Australia	139.7875	22	Did not advance	
23	Mikayla Morales; Kyra Hoevertsz	Aruba	138.4396	23	Did not advance	
24	Angelika Bastianelli; Blanka Barbócz	Hungary	135.5583	24	Did not advance	
25	Supitchaya Songpan; Pongpimporn Pongsuwan	Thailand	134.4812	25	Did not advance	
26	Dalia Penkova; Sasha Miteva	Bulgaria	132.2832	26	Did not advance	
27	Eden Worsley; Eva Morris	New Zealand	127.0959	27	Did not advance	
28	Jess Pretorius; Laura Strugnell	South Africa	121.1624	28	Did not advance	
29	Agustina Medina; Lucía Pérez	Uruguay	120.6291	29	Did not advance	
30	Luisina Caussi; Tiziana Bonucci	Argentina	120.1125	30	Did not advance	
31	Nika Seljak; Karin Pesrl	Slovenia	117.5188	31	Did not advance	
32	Karolína Klusková; Aneta Mrázková	Czech Republic	115.5354	32	Did not advance	
33	Dayaris Varona; Gabriela Alpajón	Cuba	112.3021	33	Did not advance	
34	Esmanur Yirmibeş; Nil Talu	Turkey	105.6480	34	Did not advance	
35	Maria Alfaro; Anna Mitinian	Costa Rica	99.5604	35	Did not advance	
36	Chau Cheng Han; Ao Weng I	Macau	94.0439	36	Did not advance	
	Joana Jiménez; Nuria Diosdado	Mexico	Did not start			
