= Artistic swimming at the 2023 World Aquatics Championships – Mixed duet free routine =

Mixed duet free routine at the 2023 World Aquatics Championships
- Venue: Marine Messe Fukuoka
- Location: Fukuoka, Japan
- Dates: 21 July (preliminary); 22 July (final)
- Competitors: 30 from 15 nations
- Teams: 15
- Winning points: 225.1020

Medalists
gold medal	Cheng Wentao; Shi Haoyu	China
silver medal	Itzamary González; Diego Villalobos	Mexico
bronze medal	Dennis González; Mireia Hernández	Spain

The mixed duet free routine was an artistic swimming competition at the 2023 World Aquatics Championships was held on 21 and 22 July 2023.

== Results ==
The preliminary round was started on 21 July at 10:00. The final was held on 22 July at 10:00.

Green denotes finalists

Rank	Nation	Swimmers	Preliminary		Final	
Rank	Nation	Swimmers	Points	Rank	Points	Rank
1st place, gold medalist(s)	China	Shi Haoyu; Cheng Wentao	221.1023	1	225.1020	1
2nd place, silver medalist(s)	Mexico	Itzamary González; Diego Villalobos	166.4040	5	192.5500	2
3rd place, bronze medalist(s)	Spain	Dennis González; Mireia Hernández	198.9042	2	183.4207	3
4	Colombia	Gustavo Sánchez; Jennifer Cerquera	172.3666	4	170.2208	4
5	Great Britain	Beatrice Crass; Ranjuo Tomblin	150.6208	6	151.5416	5
6	Serbia	Ivan Martinović; Jelena Kontić	143.0189	8	146.5708	6
7	Belgium	Renaud Barral; Lisa Ingenito	147.1521	7	144.7812	7
8	Thailand	Voranan Toomchay; Kantinan Adisaisiributr	138.1084	9	135.6167	8
9	Kazakhstan	Nargiza Bolatova; Eduard Kim	191.8354	3	133.6979	9
10	South Korea	Kim Ji-hye; Byun Jae-jun	125.3708	11	125.1542	10
11	Peru	Sandy Quiroz; Álvaro Aronés	135.4417	10	121.0668	11
12	Chile	Theodora Garrido; Nicolás Campos	125.3354	12	119.1291	12
13	Germany	Michelle Zimmer; Frithjof Seidel	124.7188	13	Did not advance	
14	Puerto Rico	Javier Ruisanchez; Nicolle Torrens	90.0770	14	Did not advance	
15	Cuba	Carelys Valdes; Andy Ávila	78.4522	15	Did not advance	
	Japan	Tomoka Sato; Yotaro Sato	Did not start			
