= Artistic swimming at the 2023 World Aquatics Championships – Mixed duet technical routine =

Mixed duet technical routine at the 2023 World Aquatics Championships
- Venue: Marine Messe Fukuoka
- Location: Fukuoka, Japan
- Dates: 15 July (preliminary); 16 July (final)
- Competitors: 32 from 16 nations
- Teams: 16
- Winning points: 255.5066

Medalists
gold medal	Tomoka Sato; Yotaro Sato	Japan
silver medal	Dennis González; Emma García	Spain
bronze medal	Cheng Wentao; Shi Haoyu	China

The mixed duet technical routine was an artistic swimming competition at the 2023 World Aquatics Championships was held on 15 and 16 July 2023.

== Results ==
The preliminary round was started on 15 July at 14:00. The final was held on 16 July at 16:30.

Green denotes finalists

Rank	Nation	Swimmers	Preliminary		Final	
Rank	Nation	Swimmers	Points	Rank	Points	Rank
1st place, gold medalist(s)	Japan	Tomoka Sato; Yotaro Sato	227.7200	3	255.5066	1
2nd place, silver medalist(s)	Spain	Dennis González; Emma García	244.1433	1	248.0499	2
3rd place, bronze medalist(s)	China	Cheng Wentao; Shi Haoyu	188.7334	7	247.3033	3
4	Mexico	Itzamary González; Diego Villalobos	228.0075	2	223.6066	4
5	Great Britain	Ranjuo Tomblin; Beatrice Crass	190.0833	5	215.2967	5
6	Colombia	Gustavo Sánchez; Jennifer Cerquera	168.5900	12	210.1833	6
7	Kazakhstan	Eduard Kim; Nargiza Bolatova	192.0333	4	204.0967	7
8	Chile	Theodora Garrido; Nicolás Campos	177.4817	8	200.4767	8
9	Serbia	Jelena Kontić; Ivan Martinović	169.6216	11	191.1167	9
10	South Korea	Kim Ji-hye; Byun Jae-jun	188.9558	6	190.2934	10
11	Belgium	Renaud Barral; Lisa Ingenito	170.9367	10	189.2567	11
12	Peru	Sandy Quiroz; Álvaro Aronés	177.0883	9	187.5250	12
13	Puerto Rico	Javier Ruisanchez; Nicolle Torrens	165.3800	13	Did not advance	
14	Thailand	Voranan Toomchay; Kantinan Adisaisiributr	162.9283	14	Did not advance	
15	Germany	Frithjof Seidel; Michelle Zimmer	158.3550	15	Did not advance	
16	Cuba	Andy Ávila; Carelys Valdes	108.1650	16	Did not advance	
