= Artistic swimming at the 2024 World Aquatics Championships – Women's duet technical routine =

Women's duet technical routine at the 2024 World Aquatics Championships
- Venue: Aspire Dome
- Location: Doha, Qatar
- Dates: 2 February (preliminary); 5 February (final)
- Competitors: 80 from 40 nations
- Teams: 40
- Winning points: 266.0484

Medalists
gold medal	Wang Liuyi; Wang Qianyi	China
silver medal	Kate Shortman; Isabelle Thorpe	Great Britain
bronze medal	Alisa Ozhogina; Iris Tió	Spain

The Women's duet technical routine competition at the 2024 World Aquatics Championships was held on 2 and 5 February 2024.

== Results ==
The preliminary round was started on 2 February at 14:00. The final was held on 5 February at 14:00.

Green denotes finalists

Rank	Swimmers	Nationality	Preliminary		Final	
Rank	Swimmers	Nationality	Points	Rank	Points	Rank
1st place, gold medalist(s)	Wang Liuyi; Wang Qianyi	China	269.8883	1	266.0484	1
2nd place, silver medalist(s)	Kate Shortman; Isabelle Thorpe	Great Britain	253.6733	3	259.560	2
3rd place, bronze medalist(s)	Alisa Ozhogina; Iris Tió	Spain	258.7199	2	258.0333	3
4	Bregje de Brouwer; Noortje de Brouwer	Netherlands	251.5750	7	251.8633	4
5	Shelly Bobritsky; Ariel Nassee	Israel	251.7183	5	251.2432	5
6	Audrey Lamothe; Jacqueline Simoneau	Canada	243.9016	8	247.1533	6
7	Sofia Malkogeorgou; Evangelia Platanioti	Greece	251.7183	5	245.9084	7
8	Maria Gonçalves; Cheila Vieira	Portugal	231.5767	10	236.8117	8
9	Linda Cerruti; Lucrezia Ruggiero	Italy	252.1400	4	217.7833	9
10	Hur Yoon-seo; Lee Ri-young	South Korea	232.7351	9	204.5667	10
11	Nuria Diosdado; Joana Jiménez	Mexico	223.2233	12	203.8166	11
12	Diana Onkes; Ziyodakhon Toshkhujaeva	Uzbekistan	223.8500	11	203.4817	12
13	Arina Pushkina; Yasmin Tuyakova	Kazakhstan	222.3934	13	Did not advance	
14	Melisa Ceballos; Estefanía Roa	Colombia	217.3399	14	Did not advance	
15	Kyra Hoevertsz; Mikayla Morales	Aruba	216.7183	15	Did not advance	
16	Karolína Klusková; Aneta Mrázková	Czech Republic	216.1000	16	Did not advance	
17	Soledad García; Trinidad García	Chile	214.1434	17	Did not advance	
18	Chiara Diky; Lea Anna Krajčovičová	Slovakia	213.9150	18	Did not advance	
19	Carolyn Buckle; Kiera Gazzard	Australia	211.1166	19	Did not advance	
20	Maryna Aleksiiva; Vladyslava Aleksiiva	Ukraine	210.9650	20	Did not advance	
21	Yvette Chong; Debbie Soh	Singapore	206.6867	21	Did not advance	
22	Johanna Bleyer; Klara Bleyer	Germany	204.9199	22	Did not advance	
23	Blanka Barbócz; Angelika Bastianelli	Hungary	204.3967	23	Did not advance	
24	Laura Miccuci; Gabriela Regly	Brazil	203.9932	24	Did not advance	
25	Hana Hiekal; Malak Toson	Egypt	203.7000	25	Did not advance	
26	Noemi Büchel; Leila Marxer	Liechtenstein	200.9201	26	Did not advance	
27	María Ccoyllo; Camila Fernández	Peru	200.5100	27	Did not advance	
28	Agustina Medina; Lucía Ververis	Uruguay	188.6535	28	Did not advance	
29	Duru Kanberoğlu; Bade Yıldız	Turkey	187.2751	29	Did not advance	
30	Cesia Castaneda; Grecia Mendoza	El Salvador	187.1016	30	Did not advance	
31	Pongpimporn Pongsuwan; Supitchaya Songpan	Thailand	186.9250	31	Did not advance	
32	Ao Weng I Chau Cheng Han	Macau	178.8834	32	Did not advance	
33	Ani Kipiani; Nita Natobadze	Georgia	176.8650	33	Did not advance	
34	Andrea Maroto; Raquel Zúñiga	Costa Rica	176.7768	34	Did not advance	
35	Thea Grima Buttigieg; Emily Ruggier	Malta	176.1333	35	Did not advance	
36	Nina Brown; Eva Morris	New Zealand	175.5834	36	Did not advance	
37	Gabriela Alpajón; Dayaris Varona	Cuba	172.9066	37	Did not advance	
38	Tiziana Bonucci; Luisina Caussi	Argentina	169.2433	38	Did not advance	
39	Hilda Tri Julyandra; Gabrielle Permata Sari	Indonesia	158.4967	39	Did not advance	
40	Grace Borrebach; Kyra van den Berg	Curaçao	137.0949	40	Did not advance	
	Moe Higa; Mashiro Yasunaga	Japan	Did not start			
	Jennah Hafsi; Noah Kroon	Morocco	Did not start			
	Jessica Hayes-Hill; Laura Strugnell	South Africa	Did not start			
