= Colombia at the 2024 World Aquatics Championships =

- Flag of Colombia
- World Aquatics code: COL
- National federation: Federación Colombiana de Natación
- Website: fecna.com.co

in Doha, Qatar
- Competitors: 22 in 5 sports
- Medals Ranked 31st: Gold 0 Silver 0 Bronze 2 Total 2

World Aquatics Championships appearances
- 1973; 1975; 1978; 1982; 1986; 1991; 1994; 1998; 2001; 2003; 2005; 2007; 2009; 2011; 2013; 2015; 2017; 2019; 2022; 2023; 2024; 2025

Colombia competed at the 2024 World Aquatics Championships in Doha, Qatar from 2 to 18 February.

== Medalists ==
Medal	Name	Sport	Event	Date
3rd place, bronze medalist(s)	Gustavo Sánchez	Artistic swimming	Men's solo technical routine	5 February 2024
3rd place, bronze medalist(s)	Gustavo Sánchez	Artistic swimming	Men's solo free routine	7 February 2024

== Competitors ==
The following is the list of competitors in the Championships.

Sport	Men	Women	Total
Artistic swimming	1	4	5
Diving	6	1	7
High diving	3	1	4
Open water swimming	1*	0	1*
Swimming	3*	3	6*
Total	13*	9	22*

- Juan Morales competed in both open water swimming and pool swimming.

== Artistic swimming ==
Men

Athlete	Event	Preliminaries		Final	
Athlete	Event	Points	Rank	Points	Rank
Gustavo Sánchez	Solo technical routine	228.9966	2 Q	231.0000	3rd place, bronze medalist(s)
Gustavo Sánchez	Solo free routine	140.6583	6 Q	192.0812	3rd place, bronze medalist(s)

Women

Athlete	Event	Preliminaries		Final	
Athlete	Event	Points	Rank	Points	Rank
Mónica Arango	Solo technical routine	230.6650	10 Q	201.3300	11
Mónica Arango	Solo free routine	192.1437	14	Did not advance	
Melisa Ceballos; Estefanía Roa	Duet technical routine	217.3399	14	Did not advance	
Melisa Ceballos; Estefanía Roa	Duet free routine	190.4313	12	185.7103	12

Mixed

Athlete	Event	Preliminaries		Final	
Athlete	Event	Points	Rank	Points	Rank
Jennifer Cerquera; Gustavo Sánchez	Duet technical routine	214.9517	7 Q	197.3592	8
Jennifer Cerquera; Gustavo Sánchez	Duet free routine	181.7958	4 Q	191.8729	4

== Diving ==
Men

Athlete	Event	Preliminaries		Semifinals		Final	
Athlete	Event	Points	Rank	Points	Rank	Points	Rank
Leonardo García	10 m platform	318.75	31	Did not advance			
Sebastián Morales	1 m springboard	350.70	10 Q	—N/a		340.60	10
Sebastián Morales	3 m springboard	274.75	55	Did not advance			
Luis Uribe	3 m springboard	381.95	13 Q	440.75	4 Q	443.15	4
Sebastián Villa	10 m platform	372.15	16 Q	385.40	13	Did not advance	
Daniel Restrepo; Luis Uribe	3 m synchro springboard	—N/a				320.13	17
Alejandro Solarte; Sebastián Villa	10 m synchro platform	—N/a				324.27	15

Women

Athlete	Event	Preliminaries		Semifinals		Final	
Athlete	Event	Points	Rank	Points	Rank	Points	Rank
Mariana Osorio	10 m platform	199.10	39	Did not advance			

== High diving ==
Athlete	Event	Points	Rank
Miguel García	Men's high diving	317.95	11
Juan Gil	Men's high diving	240.95	20
Víctor Ortega	Men's high diving	267.50	17
María Quintero	Women's high diving	258.80	10

== Open water swimming ==
Men

Athlete	Event	Time	Rank
Juan Morales	10 km	1:50:43.8	32

== Swimming ==
Colombia entered 6 swimmers.

Men

Athlete	Event	Heat		Semifinal		Final	
Athlete	Event	Time	Rank	Time	Rank	Time	Rank
David Arias	100 metre butterfly	52.72	19	Did not advance			
David Arias	200 metre butterfly	2:02.32	30	Did not advance			
Juan Morales	400 metre freestyle	3:54.22	33	—N/a		Did not advance	
Juan Morales	800 metre freestyle	8:11.31	35	—N/a		Did not advance	
Jorge Murillo	50 metre breaststroke	28.38	28	Did not advance			
Jorge Murillo	100 metre breaststroke	1:02.44	35	Did not advance			
Jorge Murillo	200 metre breaststroke	2:22.90	31	Did not advance			

Women

Athlete	Event	Heat		Semifinal		Final	
Athlete	Event	Time	Rank	Time	Rank	Time	Rank
Valentina Becerra	100 metre butterfly	1:00.34	23	Did not advance			
Stefanía Gómez	50 metre breaststroke	31.75	23	Did not advance			
Stefanía Gómez	100 metre breaststroke	1:08.67	20	Did not advance			
Stefanía Gómez	200 metre individual medley	2:16.22	17 Q	2:19.30	16	Did not advance	
Sirena Rowe	50 metre freestyle	25.91	35	Did not advance			
Sirena Rowe	50 metre butterfly	27.29	29	Did not advance			
