= Artistic swimming at the 2023 World Aquatics Championships – Team acrobatic routine =

Team acrobatic routine at the 2023 World Aquatics Championships
- Venue: Marine Messe Fukuoka
- Location: Fukuoka, Japan
- Dates: 15 July (preliminary); 17 July (final)
- Competitors: 152 from 19 nations
- Teams: 19
- Winning points: 238.0033

Medalists
gold medal	Chang Hao; Cheng Wentao; Feng Yu; Shi Haoyu; Wang Ciyue; Xiang Binxuan; Xiao Yanning; Zhang Yayi	China
silver medal	Anita Álvarez; Jaime Czarkowski; Nicole Dzurko; Keana Hunter; Audrey Kwon; Calista Liu; Bill May; Daniella Ramirez	United States
bronze medal	Moka Fujii; Ikoi Hirota; Moeka Kijima; Tomoka Sato; Yotaro Sato; Hikari Suzuki; Akane Yanagisawa; Megumu Yoshida	Japan

The team acrobatic routine was an artistic swimming competition at the 2023 World Aquatics Championships was held on 15 and 17 July 2023.

== Results ==
The preliminary round was started on 15 July at 10:00. The final was held on 17 July at 19:30.

Green denotes finalists

Rank	Nation	Preliminary		Final	
Rank	Nation	Points	Rank	Points	Rank
1st place, gold medalist(s)	China	236.0733	1	238.0033	1
2nd place, silver medalist(s)	United States	233.9333	2	232.4033	2
3rd place, bronze medalist(s)	Japan	224.5167	4	220.5867	3
4	Mexico	202.4533	7	215.7267	4
5	France	212.8900	5	210.6900	5
6	Canada	203.6600	6	205.4900	6
7	Ukraine	227.9200	3	204.3634	7
8	Israel	198.4967	8	199.9667	8
9	Germany	190.0267	10	197.3501	9
10	Kazakhstan	178.5166	11	191.5333	10
11	Egypt	178.4466	12	177.6833	11
12	Italy	197.5167	9	177.3267	12
13	Great Britain	169.4567	13	Did not advance	
14	Australia	159.7100	14	Did not advance	
15	Singapore	159.1299	15	Did not advance	
16	Chile	154.2067	16	Did not advance	
17	New Zealand	153.0934	17	Did not advance	
18	Greece	144.1068	18	Did not advance	
19	Thailand	122.7601	19	Did not advance	
