= Diving at the 2023 World Aquatics Championships – Women's 3 metre springboard =

Women's 3 metre springboard at the 2023 World Aquatics Championships
- Venue: Fukuoka Prefectural Pool
- Location: Fukuoka, Japan
- Dates: 20 July (preliminary and semifinal); 21 July (final)
- Competitors: 51 from 33 nations
- Winning points: 359.50

Medalists
gold medal	Chen Yiwen	China
silver medal	Chang Yani	China
bronze medal	Pamela Ware	Canada

The women's 3 metre springboard competition at the 2023 World Aquatics Championships was held on 20 and 21 July 2023.

== Results ==
The preliminary round was started on 20 July at 09:00. The semifinal was held on 20 July at 14:30. The final was started on 21 July at 18:00.

Green denotes finalists

Blue denotes semifinalists

Rank	Diver	Nationality	Preliminary		Semifinal		Final	
Rank	Diver	Nationality	Points	Rank	Points	Rank	Points	Rank
1st place, gold medalist(s)	Chen Yiwen	China	355.00	1	363.70	1	359.50	1
2nd place, silver medalist(s)	Chang Yani	China	303.60	4	354.75	2	341.50	2
3rd place, bronze medalist(s)	Pamela Ware	Canada	304.95	3	332.40	4	332.00	3
4	Maddison Keeney	Australia	301.00	6	319.75	6	327.95	4
5	Chiara Pellacani	Italy	277.70	14	304.95	8	308.15	5
6	Hailey Hernandez	United States	277.45	16	291.75	12	307.15	6
7	Sayaka Mikami	Japan	316.05	2	340.55	3	305.25	7
8	Emilia Nilsson Garip	Sweden	289.80	8	308.15	7	302.00	8
9	Scarlett Mew Jensen	Great Britain	288.60	10	302.05	10	299.10	9
10	Julia Vincent	South Africa	277.70	14	295.95	11	297.30	10
11	Sarah Bacon	United States	292.95	7	320.10	5	293.20	11
12	Elena Bertocchi	Italy	284.85	12	303.05	9	269.65	12
13	Carolina Mendoza	Mexico	276.15	18	289.75	13	Did not advance	
14	Elizabeth Roussel	New Zealand	277.10	17	287.60	14	Did not advance	
15	Nur Dhabitah Sabri	Malaysia	303.55	5	285.45	15	Did not advance	
16	Kim Su-ji	South Korea	285.05	11	283.60	16	Did not advance	
17	Clare Cryan	Ireland	289.55	9	283.45	17	Did not advance	
18	Lena Hentschel	Germany	282.65	13	225.30	18	Did not advance	
19	Georgia Sheehan	Australia	274.90	19	Did not advance			
19	Jana Rother	Germany	274.90	19	Did not advance			
21	Mia Vallée	Canada	274.80	21	Did not advance			
22	Michelle Heimberg	Switzerland	271.85	22	Did not advance			
23	Elna Widerström	Sweden	270.90	23	Did not advance			
24	Yasmin Harper	Great Britain	266.10	24	Did not advance			
25	Helle Tuxen	Norway	262.45	25	Did not advance			
26	Daniela Zapata	Colombia	262.40	26	Did not advance			
27	Gladies Lariesa Garina Haga	Indonesia	255.20	27	Did not advance			
28	Anisley García	Cuba	254.10	28	Did not advance			
29	Naïs Gillet	France	253.90	29	Did not advance			
30	Anna Santos	Brazil	251.60	30	Did not advance			
31	Prisis Ruiz	Cuba	250.80	31	Did not advance			
32	Elizabeth Pérez	Venezuela	233.90	32	Did not advance			
33	Kaja Skrzek	Poland	233.55	33	Did not advance			
34	Haruka Enomoto	Japan	232.80	34	Did not advance			
35	Rocío Velázquez	Spain	230.65	35	Did not advance			
36	Ng Yan Yee	Malaysia	229.25	36	Did not advance			
37	Park Ha-reum	South Korea	227.05	37	Did not advance			
38	Maha Amer Eissa	Egypt	219.75	38	Did not advance			
39	Aranza Vázquez	Mexico	218.70	39	Did not advance			
40	Estilla Mosena	Hungary	215.80	40	Did not advance			
41	Celine van Duijn	Netherlands	214.60	41	Did not advance			
42	Juliette Landi	France	211.10	42	Did not advance			
43	Ana Ricci	Peru	207.75	43	Did not advance			
44	Ashlee Tan	Singapore	204.40	44	Did not advance			
45	Lauren Hallaselkä	Finland	193.35	45	Did not advance			
46	Elizabeth Miclau	Puerto Rico	193.05	46	Did not advance			
47	Patrícia Kun	Hungary	189.30	47	Did not advance			
48	Amelie Foerster	Romania	188.95	48	Did not advance			
49	Bailey Heydra	South Africa	188.40	49	Did not advance			
50	Caroline Kupka	Norway	184.70	50	Did not advance			
	Luana Lira	Brazil	Did not finish					
	Maggie Squire	New Zealand	Did not start					
