= Singapore at the 2023 World Aquatics Championships =

- Flag of Singapore
- FINA code: SGP
- National federation: Singapore Swimming Federation
- Website: singaporeswimming.org

in Fukuoka, Japan
- Competitors: 27 in 4 sports
- Medals: Gold 0 Silver 0 Bronze 0 Total 0

World Aquatics Championships appearances
- 1973; 1975; 1978; 1982; 1986; 1991; 1994; 1998; 2001; 2003; 2005; 2007; 2009; 2011; 2013; 2015; 2017; 2019; 2022; 2023; 2024

Singapore competed at the 2023 World Aquatics Championships in Fukuoka, Japan from 14 to 30 July.

== Athletes by discipline ==
The following is the list of number of competitors participating at the Championships per discipline.

Sport	Men	Women	Total
Artistic swimming	0	11	11
Diving	2	1	3
Open water swimming	1	1	2
Swimming	7	4	11
Total	10	17	27

- Moesha Johnson was compete in both open water swimming and indoor swimming.

== Artistic swimming ==
Women

Athlete	Event	Preliminaries		Final	
Athlete	Event	Points	Rank	Points	Rank
Debbie Soh; Miya Yong	Duet technical routine	176.5883	25	Did not advance	

Mixed

Athlete	Event	Preliminaries		Final	
Athlete	Event	Points	Rank	Points	Rank
Yvette Ann Chong; Posh Soh; Claire Tan; Caitlyn Anne Tan; Vivien Tai; Royce Soh; Eleanor Quah; Kiera Lee	Team acrobatic routine	159.1299	15	Did not advance	
Posh Soh; Kiera Lee; Claire Tan; Debbie Soh; Yvette Ann Chong; Eleanor Quah; Vivien Tai; Rhea Thean	Team technical routine	192.3279	13	Did not advance	
Vivien Tai; Royce Soh; Eleanor Quah; Kiera Lee; Posh Soh; Claire Tan; Rae-Anne Ong; Yvette Ann Chong	Team free routine	DNS			

== Diving ==
Singapore entered 3 divers.

Men

Athlete	Event	Preliminaries		Semifinals		Final	
Athlete	Event	Points	Rank	Points	Rank	Points	Rank
Max Lee	10 m platform	337.20	28	Did not advance			
Avvir Tham	1 m springboard	291.65	34	—		Did not advance	
Avvir Tham	3 m springboard	359.60	30	Did not advance			

Women

Athlete	Event	Preliminaries		Semifinals		Final	
Athlete	Event	Points	Rank	Points	Rank	Points	Rank
Ashlee Tan	3 m springboard	204.40	44	Did not advance			

== Open water swimming ==
Singapore entered 3 open water swimmers.

Men

Athlete	Event	Time	Rank
Artyom Lukasevits	Men's 10 km	DNS	
Ritchie Oh	Men's 10 km	2:05:36.3	55

Women

Athlete	Event	Time	Rank
Chantal Liew	Women's 5 km	1:01:29.3	25
Chantal Liew	Women's 10 km	2:07:48.5	34

== Swimming ==
Singapore entered 11 swimmers.

Men

Athlete	Event	Heat		Semifinal		Final	
Athlete	Event	Time	Rank	Time	Rank	Time	Rank
Maximillian Wei Ang	50 metre breaststroke	28.51	34	Did not advance			
Maximillian Wei Ang	100 metre breaststroke	1:02.45	40	Did not advance			
Maximillian Wei Ang	200 metre breaststroke	2:14.63	31	Did not advance			
Glen Lim Jun Wei	200 m freestyle	1:49.13	33	Did not advance			
Glen Lim Jun Wei	400 m freestyle	3:54.42	31	—		Did not advance	
Glen Lim Jun Wei	800 m freestyle	8:09.90	33	—		Did not advance	
Mikkel Lee	50 metre butterfly	23.73	30	Did not advance			
Quah Zheng Wen	50 metre backstroke	25.76	32	Did not advance			
Quah Zheng Wen	100 metre backstroke	55.30	32	Did not advance			
Quah Zheng Wen	100 metre butterfly	52.53	30	Did not advance			
Jonathan Tan	50 metre freestyle	22.20	26	Did not advance			
Jonathan Tan	100 metre freestyle	49.08	34	Did not advance			
Tan Zachary Ian	200 metre individual medley	2:04.92	34	Did not advance			
Teong Tzen Wei	50 metre freestyle	22.76	48	Did not advance			
Teong Tzen Wei	50 metre butterfly	23.92	41	Did not advance			
Quah Zheng Wen; Jonathan Tan; Mikkel Lee; Glen Lim Jun Wei	4 × 100 m freestyle relay	3:17.89	18	—		Did not advance	

Women

Athlete	Event	Heat		Semifinal		Final	
Athlete	Event	Time	Rank	Time	Rank	Time	Rank
Gan Ching Hwee	200 m freestyle	2:02.32	39	Did not advance			
Gan Ching Hwee	400 m freestyle	4:13.10	24	—		Did not advance	
Gan Ching Hwee	800 m freestyle	8:36.31	17	—		Did not advance	
Gan Ching Hwee	1500 m freestyle	16:20.88 NR	14	—		Did not advance	
Quah Jing Wen	100 metre butterfly	59.60	25	Did not advance			
Quah Jing Wen	200 metre butterfly	2:11.50	19	Did not advance			
Quah Ting Wen	50 metre freestyle	25.52	28	Did not advance			
Quah Ting Wen	100 metre freestyle	56.52	31	Did not advance			
Quah Ting Wen	50 metre butterfly	26.67	25	Did not advance			
Letitia Sim	50 metre breaststroke	31.33	24	Did not advance			
Letitia Sim	100 metre breaststroke	1:07.65	25	Did not advance			
Letitia Sim	200 metre breaststroke	2:27.73 NR	22	Did not advance			
Letitia Sim	200 metre individual medley	2:17.20	26	Did not advance			

Mixed

Athlete	Event	Heat		Final	
Athlete	Event	Time	Rank	Time	Rank
Jonathan Tan; Mikkel Lee; Quah Ting Wen; Quah Jing Wen	4 × 100 m freestyle relay	3:30.89	20	Did not advance	
