= Shi Haoyu =

Chinese artistic swimmer (born 2001)

Personal information
- Nationality: Chinese
- Born: 14 October 2001 (age 24)

Sport
- Country: China
- Sport: Synchronised swimming
Medal record
Women's artistic swimming
Representing China
World Championships
Gold medal – first place	2023 Fukuoka	Mixed duet free
Gold medal – first place	2023 Fukuoka	Team acrobatic
Gold medal – first place	2024 Doha	Mixed duet free
Silver medal – second place	2024 Doha	Mixed duet technical
Bronze medal – third place	2023 Fukuoka	Mixed duet technical
Bronze medal – third place	2022 Budapest	Mixed duet technical
Bronze medal – third place	2022 Budapest	Mixed duet free
Asian Games
Gold medal – first place	2022 Hangzhou	Team
World Junior Championships
Silver medal – second place	2018 Budapest	Mixed duet technical
Silver medal – second place	2018 Budapest	Mixed duet free

Shi Haoyu (Chinese: 石浩玙, born 14 October 2001) is a Chinese synchronised swimmer.

== Career ==
Shi made his World Aquatics Championships debut in 2022 and won bronze medals in the mixed duet technical and mixed duet free routines. He became the first Chinese male artistic swimmer to medal at the World Championship.

In July 2023, he competed at the 2023 World Aquatics Championships and won a gold medal in the mixed duet free routine, along with Cheng Wentao. This marked the first time China won gold in the event at the World Aquatics Championships. He also won a gold medal in the team acrobatic routine, and a bronze medal in the mixed duet technical routine. He then competed at the 2022 Asian Games, which were postponed until October 2023. This marked the first time men competed in artistic swimming at the Asian Games. He won a gold medal in the team routine.

In February 2024, he competed at the 2024 World Aquatics Championships and again won a gold medal in the mixed duet free routine along with Cheng. He also won a silver medal in the mixed duet technical routine with Cheng.
