= Kazakhstan at the 2023 World Aquatics Championships =

- Flag of Kazakhstan
- FINA code: KAZ
- National federation: Swimming Federation of the Republic of Kazakhstan
- Website: aquatics.kz

in Fukuoka, Japan
- Competitors: 50 in 4 sports
- Medals Ranked 26th: Gold 0 Silver 0 Bronze 1 Total 1

World Aquatics Championships appearances
- 1994; 1998; 2001; 2003; 2005; 2007; 2009; 2011; 2013; 2015; 2017; 2019; 2022; 2023; 2024

Other related appearances
- Soviet Union (1973–1991)

Kazakhstan is set to compete at the 2023 World Aquatics Championships in Fukuoka, Japan from 14 to 30 July.

== Medalists ==
| Medal | Name | Sport | Event | Date |
|---|---|---|---|---|
| Bronze | Eduard Kim | Artistic swimming | Men's solo technical routine | July 17 |

== Athletes by discipline ==
The following is the list of number of competitors participating at the Championships per discipline.

| Sport | Men | Women | Total |
|---|---|---|---|
| Artistic swimming | 2 | 12 | 14 |
| Open water swimming | 3 | 2* | 5* |
| Swimming | 1 | 3* | 4* |
| Water polo | 15 | 13 | 28 |
| Total | 21 | 29 | 50 |

- Diana Taszhanova was compete in both open water swimming and indoor swimming.

== Artistic swimming ==
Kazakhstan entered 14 artistic swimmers.

Men

| Athlete | Event | Preliminaries | | Final | |
| Athlete | Event | Points | Rank | Points | Rank |
|---|---|---|---|---|---|
| Eduard Kim | Solo technical routine | 180.5634 | 5 Q | 216.0000 | 3rd place, bronze medalist(s) |
| Eduard Kim | Solo free routine | 173.0499 | 2 Q | DNS | |

Women

| Athlete | Event | Preliminaries | | Final | |
| Athlete | Event | Points | Rank | Points | Rank |
|---|---|---|---|---|---|
| Karina Magrupova | Solo technical routine | 195.3433 | 10 Q | 192.3200 | 11 |
| Karina Magrupova | Solo free routine | 137.0083 | 15 | Did not advance | |
| Arina Pushkina; Yasmin Tuyakova | Duet technical routine | 184.2734 | 21 | Did not advance | |
| Arina Pushkina; Yasmin Tuyakova | Duet free routine | 141.8146 | 21 | Did not advance | |

Mixed

| Athlete | Event | Preliminaries | | Final | |
| Athlete | Event | Points | Rank | Points | Rank |
|---|---|---|---|---|---|
| Nargiza Bolatova; Eduard Kim | Duet technical routine | 192.0333 | 4 Q | 204.0967 | 7 |
| Nargiza Bolatova; Eduard Kim | Duet free routine | 191.8354 | 3 Q | 133.6979 | 9 |
| Nargiza Bolatova; Eteri Kakutia; Aigerim Kurmangaliyeva; Artur Maidanov; Xeniya Makarova; Anna Pavletsova; Valeriya Stolbunova; Zhaklin Yakimova | Team acrobatic routine | 178.5166 | 11 Q | 191.5333 | 10 |
| Eteri Kakutia; Aigerim Kurmangaliyeva; Karina Magrupova; Xeniya Makarova; Anna Pavletsova; Valeriya Stolbunova; Zhaklin Yakimova; Zhaniya Zhiyengazy | Team technical routine | 179.5535 | 17 | Did not advance | |
| Eteri Kakutia; Aigerim Kurmangaliyeva; Xeniya Makarova; Arina Myasnikova; Anna Pavletsova; Valeriya Stolbunova; Zhaklin Yakimova; Zhaniya Zhiyengazy | Team free routine | 189.2292 | 12 Q | 185.0375 | 11 |

== Open water swimming ==
Kazikhstan entered 5 open water swimmers.

Men

| Athlete | Event | Time | Rank |
|---|---|---|---|
| Daniil Androssov | Men's 10 km | 2:05:36.4 | 56 |
| Galymzhan Balabek | Men's 5 km | 1:01:29.3 | 56 |
| Lev Cherepanov | Men's 5 km | 58:21.0 | 38 |
| Lev Cherepanov | Men's 10 km | 2:03:08.4 | 45 |

Women

| Athlete | Event | Time | Rank |
|---|---|---|---|
| Mariya Fedotova | Women's 5 km | 1:05:57.4 | 45 |
| Mariya Fedotova | Women's 10 km | 2:22:57.6 | 54 |
| Diana Taszhanova | Women's 5 km | 1:02:25.9 | 30 |
| Diana Taszhanova | Women's 10 km | 2:13:16.7 | 44 |

Mixed

| Athlete | Event | Time | Rank |
|---|---|---|---|
| Diana Taszhanova; Galymzhan Balabek; Mariya Fedotova; Lev Cherepanov | Team relay | 1:17:41.8 | 17 |

== Swimming ==
Kazakhstan entered 4 swimmers.

Men

| Athlete | Event | Heat | | Semifinal | | Final | |
| Athlete | Event | Time | Rank | Time | Rank | Time | Rank |
|---|---|---|---|---|---|---|---|
| Adilbek Mussin | 100 metre freestyle | 49.64 | 39 | Did not advance | | | |
| Adilbek Mussin | 50 metre butterfly | 23.55 | 24 | Did not advance | | | |
| Adilbek Mussin | 100 metre butterfly | 51.68 NR | 14 Q | 51.81 | 14 | Did not advance | |

Women

| Athlete | Event | Heat | | Semifinal | | Final | |
| Athlete | Event | Time | Rank | Time | Rank | Time | Rank |
|---|---|---|---|---|---|---|---|
| Xeniya Ignatova | 50 metre backstroke | 29.25 | 35 | Did not advance | | | |
| Xeniya Ignatova | 100 metre backstroke | 1:02.34 | 32 | Did not advance | | | |
| Xeniya Ignatova | 200 metre backstroke | 2:16.06 | 27 | Did not advance | | | |
| Adelaida Pchelintseva | 50 metre breaststroke | 31.61 | 28 | Did not advance | | | |
| Adelaida Pchelintseva | 100 metre breaststroke | 1:11.41 | 42 | Did not advance | | | |
| Diana Taszhanova | 800 metre freestyle | 8:51.46 | 30 | — | | Did not advance | |
| Diana Taszhanova | 1500 metre freestyle | 17:09.98 | 29 | — | | Did not advance | |

== Water polo ==
Summary

| Team | Event | Group stage | | | | Playoff | Quarterfinal | Semifinal | Final / BM | |
| Team | Event | Opposition Score | Opposition Score | Opposition Score | Rank | Opposition Score | Opposition Score | Opposition Score | Opposition Score | Rank |
|---|---|---|---|---|---|---|---|---|---|---|
| Kazakhstan | Men's tournament | United States; L 5–18 | Greece; L 2–18 | Australia; L 6–22 | 4 | — | — | China; W 12–5 | Argentina; L 7–11 | 14 |
| Kazakhstan | Women's tournament | Israel; L 6–17 | Netherlands; L 2–30 | Spain; L 5–24 | 4 | — | — | China; L 6–16 | Argentina; W 10–8 | 15 |

=== Men's tournament ===
Team roster

The following is the Kazakh roster.

Head coach: Nebojša Obradović

- 1 Temirlan Balfanbayev GK
- 2 Eduard Tsoy FP
- 3 Yegor Berbelyuk FP
- 4 Dushan Markovich FP
- 5 Danil Artyukh FP
- 6 Alexey Shmider FP
- 7 Murat Shakenov FP
- 8 Srđan Vuksanović FP
- 9 Ruslan Akhmetov FP
- 10 Mikhail Ruday FP
- 11 Olzhas Kanysh FP
- 12 Sultan Shonzhigitov FP
- 13 Daniil Matolinets GK
- Maxim Lamayev FP
- Yegor Beloussev FP

Group play

| Pos | Team | Pld | W | PSW | PSL | L | GF | GA | GD | Pts | Qualification |
|---|---|---|---|---|---|---|---|---|---|---|---|
| 1 | Greece | 3 | 3 | 0 | 0 | 0 | 46 | 25 | +21 | 9 | Quarterfinals |
| 2 | United States | 3 | 2 | 0 | 0 | 1 | 48 | 28 | +20 | 6 | Playoffs |
| 3 | Australia | 3 | 1 | 0 | 0 | 2 | 39 | 35 | +4 | 3 | Playoffs |
| 4 | Kazakhstan | 3 | 0 | 0 | 0 | 3 | 13 | 58 | −45 | 0 | |

Source: Sportresult
Rules for classification: 1) points; 2) head-to-head points; 3) head-to-head goal difference; 4) head-to-head number of goals scored; 5) Goal difference.

| 17 July 2023; 09:00 | Report | Kazakhstan | 5–18 | United States | Marine Messe Fukuoka, Fukuoka; Referees: Chisato Kurosaki (JPN), David Gómez (ESP) |
| 17 July 2023; 09:00 | Report | Score by quarters: 1–5, 4–4, 0–4, 0–5 | | | Marine Messe Fukuoka, Fukuoka; Referees: Chisato Kurosaki (JPN), David Gómez (ESP) |
| 17 July 2023; 09:00 | Report | Markovich 3 | Goals | Abramson 5 | Marine Messe Fukuoka, Fukuoka; Referees: Chisato Kurosaki (JPN), David Gómez (ESP) |

| 19 July 2023; 17:30 | Report | Greece | 18–2 | Kazakhstan | Marine Messe Fukuoka, Fukuoka; Referees: Raffaele Colombo (ITA), Germán Moller (ARG) |
| 19 July 2023; 17:30 | Report | Score by quarters: 6–1, 5–0, 4–1, 3–0 | | | Marine Messe Fukuoka, Fukuoka; Referees: Raffaele Colombo (ITA), Germán Moller (ARG) |
| 19 July 2023; 17:30 | Report | three players 3 | Goals | Akhmetov, Ruday 1 | Marine Messe Fukuoka, Fukuoka; Referees: Raffaele Colombo (ITA), Germán Moller (ARG) |

| 21 July 2023; 16:00 | Report | Australia | 22–6 | Kazakhstan | Marine Messe Fukuoka, Fukuoka; Referees: Tamás Kovács-Csatlós (HUN), David Gómez (ESP) |
| 21 July 2023; 16:00 | Report | Score by quarters: 7–2, 3–0, 4–2, 8–2 | | | Marine Messe Fukuoka, Fukuoka; Referees: Tamás Kovács-Csatlós (HUN), David Gómez (ESP) |
| 21 July 2023; 16:00 | Report | Negus, Poot 4 | Goals | Artyukh 2 | Marine Messe Fukuoka, Fukuoka; Referees: Tamás Kovács-Csatlós (HUN), David Gómez (ESP) |

13–16th place semifinals

| 23 July 2023; 09:00 | Report | Kazakhstan | 12–5 | China | Marine Messe Fukuoka, Fukuoka; Referees: Chisato Kurosaki (JPN), Vojin Putniković (SRB) |
| 23 July 2023; 09:00 | Report | Score by quarters: 1–1, 4–0, 3–1, 4–3 | | | Marine Messe Fukuoka, Fukuoka; Referees: Chisato Kurosaki (JPN), Vojin Putniković (SRB) |
| 23 July 2023; 09:00 | Report | Markovich 4 | Goals | Xie Z. 3 | Marine Messe Fukuoka, Fukuoka; Referees: Chisato Kurosaki (JPN), Vojin Putniković (SRB) |

13th place game

| 25 July 2023; 10:30 | Report | Kazakhstan | 7–11 | Argentina | Marine Messe Fukuoka, Fukuoka; Referees: Marta Cabanas (ESP), Lee-Anne Stewart (RSA) |
| 25 July 2023; 10:30 | Report | Score by quarters: 1–5, 1–1, 3–3, 2–2 | | | Marine Messe Fukuoka, Fukuoka; Referees: Marta Cabanas (ESP), Lee-Anne Stewart (RSA) |
| 25 July 2023; 10:30 | Report | Markovich, Vuksanovich 2 | Goals | Corsi 4 | Marine Messe Fukuoka, Fukuoka; Referees: Marta Cabanas (ESP), Lee-Anne Stewart (RSA) |

=== Women's tournament ===
Team roster

The following is the Kazakh roster.

Head coach: Marina Pertseva

- 1 Alexandra Zharkimbayeva GK
- 2 Darya Pochinok FP
- 3 Anastasiya Glukhova FP
- 4 Viktoriya Kaplun FP
- 5 Valeriya Anossova FP
- 6 Madina Rakhmanova FP
- 7 Anna Novikova FP
- 8 Olga Vorontsova FP
- 9 Milena Nabiyeva FP
- 10 Viktoriya Khritankova FP
- 11 Anastassiya Mirshina FP
- 12 Anastassiya Tsoy FP
- 13 Mariya Martynenko GK

Group play

| Pos | Team | Pld | W | PSW | PSL | L | GF | GA | GD | Pts | Qualification |
|---|---|---|---|---|---|---|---|---|---|---|---|
| 1 | Netherlands | 3 | 3 | 0 | 0 | 0 | 61 | 16 | +45 | 9 | Quarterfinals |
| 2 | Spain | 3 | 2 | 0 | 0 | 1 | 52 | 17 | +35 | 6 | Playoffs |
| 3 | Israel | 3 | 1 | 0 | 0 | 2 | 30 | 52 | −22 | 3 | Playoffs |
| 4 | Kazakhstan | 3 | 0 | 0 | 0 | 3 | 13 | 71 | −58 | 0 | |

Source: Sportresult
Rules for classification: 1) points; 2) head-to-head points; 3) head-to-head goal difference; 4) head-to-head number of goals scored; 5) Goal difference.

| 16 July 2023; 13:30 | Report | Israel | 17–6 | Kazakhstan | Marine Messe Fukuoka, Fukuoka; Referees: Natalia Markopoulou (GRE), Lee-Anne Stewart (RSA) |
| 16 July 2023; 13:30 | Report | Score by quarters: 5–3, 6–1, 2–2, 4–0 | | | Marine Messe Fukuoka, Fukuoka; Referees: Natalia Markopoulou (GRE), Lee-Anne Stewart (RSA) |
| 16 July 2023; 13:30 | Report | three players 4 | Goals | Khritankova, Mirshina 2 | Marine Messe Fukuoka, Fukuoka; Referees: Natalia Markopoulou (GRE), Lee-Anne Stewart (RSA) |

| 18 July 2023; 09:00 | Report | Kazakhstan | 2–30 | Netherlands | Marine Messe Fukuoka, Fukuoka; Referees: Hélène Painchaud (CAN), Germán Moller (ARG) |
| 18 July 2023; 09:00 | Report | Score by quarters: 0–10, 1–7, 1–9, 0–4 | | | Marine Messe Fukuoka, Fukuoka; Referees: Hélène Painchaud (CAN), Germán Moller (ARG) |
| 18 July 2023; 09:00 | Report | Mirshina, Pochinok 1 | Goals | Van de Kraats 8 | Marine Messe Fukuoka, Fukuoka; Referees: Hélène Painchaud (CAN), Germán Moller (ARG) |

| 20 July 2023; 17:30 | Report | Spain | 24–5 | Kazakhstan | Marine Messe Fukuoka, Fukuoka; Referees: Nóra Debreceni (HUN), Lee-Anne Stewart (RSA) |
| 20 July 2023; 17:30 | Report | Score by quarters: 5–3, 8–1, 5–0, 6–1 | | | Marine Messe Fukuoka, Fukuoka; Referees: Nóra Debreceni (HUN), Lee-Anne Stewart (RSA) |
| 20 July 2023; 17:30 | Report | Peña 4 | Goals | Novikova, Tsoy 2 | Marine Messe Fukuoka, Fukuoka; Referees: Nóra Debreceni (HUN), Lee-Anne Stewart (RSA) |

13–16th place semifinals

| 22 July 2023; 09:00 | Report | China | 16–6 | Kazakhstan | Marine Messe Fukuoka, Fukuoka; Referees: Jennifer McCall (USA), Hélène Painchaud (CAN) |
| 22 July 2023; 09:00 | Report | Score by quarters: 3–1, 6–2, 3–2, 4–1 | | | Marine Messe Fukuoka, Fukuoka; Referees: Jennifer McCall (USA), Hélène Painchaud (CAN) |
| 22 July 2023; 09:00 | Report | Yan S., Zhang J. 4 | Goals | Kaplun 3 | Marine Messe Fukuoka, Fukuoka; Referees: Jennifer McCall (USA), Hélène Painchaud (CAN) |

15th place game

| 24 July 2023; 09:00 | Report | Kazakhstan | 10–8 | Argentina | Marine Messe Fukuoka, Fukuoka; Referees: Raffaele Colombo (ITA), Nicola Johnson (AUS) |
| 24 July 2023; 09:00 | Report | Score by quarters: 3–0, 3–3, 2–4, 2–1 | | | Marine Messe Fukuoka, Fukuoka; Referees: Raffaele Colombo (ITA), Nicola Johnson (AUS) |
| 24 July 2023; 09:00 | Report | Khritankova, Novikova 3 | Goals | Bacigalupo 4 | Marine Messe Fukuoka, Fukuoka; Referees: Raffaele Colombo (ITA), Nicola Johnson (AUS) |
