= Mexico at the 2023 World Aquatics Championships =

- Flag of Mexico
- World Aquatics code: MEX
- National federation: Mexican Swimming Federation

in Fukuoka, Japan
- Competitors: 48 in 5 sports
- Medals Ranked 19th: Gold 0 Silver 5 Bronze 2 Total 7

World Aquatics Championships appearances
- 1973; 1975; 1978; 1982; 1986; 1991; 1994; 1998; 2001; 2003; 2005; 2007; 2009; 2011; 2013; 2015; 2017; 2019; 2022; 2023; 2024; 2025

Mexico competed at the 2023 World Aquatics Championships in Fukuoka, Japan from 14 to 30 July.

== Medalists ==
Medal	Name	Sport	Event	Date
Silver	Diego Balleza; Viviana del Ángel	Diving	Mixed synchronized 10 m platform	July 15
Silver	Osmar Olvera	Diving	Men's 1 m springboard	July 16
Silver	Gabriela Agúndez; Jahir Ocampo; Randal Willars; Aranza Vázquez	Diving	Team event	July 18
Silver	Osmar Olvera	Diving	Men's 3 m springboard	July 20
Silver	Itzamary González; Diego Villalobos	Artistic swimming	Mixed duet free routine	July 22
Bronze	Aranza Vázquez	Diving	Women's 1 m springboard	July 15
Bronze	Kevin Berlín; Randal Willars	Diving	Men's synchronized 10 m platform	July 17

Medals by sport
Sport	1st place, gold medalist(s)	2nd place, silver medalist(s)	3rd place, bronze medalist(s)	Total
Diving	0	4	2	6
Artistic swimming	0	1	0	1

== Athletes by discipline ==
The following is the list of number of competitors participating at the Championships per discipline.

Sport	Men	Women	Total
Artistic swimming	2	11	13
Diving	7	7	14
High diving	3	1	4
Open water swimming	3	3	6
Swimming	5	6	11
Total	20	28	48

== Artistic swimming ==
Men

Athlete	Event	Preliminaries		Final	
Athlete	Event	Points	Rank	Points	Rank
Joel Benavides	Solo technical routine	163.5466	7 Q	170.7166	7

Women

Athlete	Event	Preliminaries		Final	
Athlete	Event	Points	Rank	Points	Rank
Nuria Diosdado; Joana Jiménez	Duet technical routine	244.2000	6 Q	222.5667	9
Nuria Diosdado; Joana Jiménez	Duet free routine	DNS			

Mixed

Athlete	Event	Preliminaries		Final	
Athlete	Event	Points	Rank	Points	Rank
Itzamary González; Diego Villalobos	Duet technical routine	228.0075	2 Q	223.6066	4
Itzamary González; Diego Villalobos	Duet free routine	166.4040	5 Q	192.5500	2nd place, silver medalist(s)
Daniela Estrada; Luisa Rodríguez; Joana Jiménez; Glenda Inzunza; Itzamary González; Nuria Diosdado; Jessica Sobrino; Pamela Toscano	Team acrobatic routine	202.4533	7 Q	215.7267	4
Nuria Diosdado; María Fernanda Arellano; Regina Alferez; Joana Jiménez; Daniela Estrada; Pamela Toscano; Jessica Sobrino; Itzamary González	Team technical routine	219.5325	9 Q	257.1380	6

== Diving ==
Mexico entered 14 divers.

Men

Athlete	Event	Preliminaries		Semifinals		Final	
Athlete	Event	Points	Rank	Points	Rank	Points	Rank
Diego Balleza	10 m platform	361.65	21	Did not advance			
Juan Celaya	1 m springboard	362.30	10 Q	—N/a		406.25	4
Rodrigo Diego	3 m springboard	419.65	7 Q	446.45	6 Q	439.80	5
Osmar Olvera	1 m springboard	395.85	2 Q	—N/a		428.85	2nd place, silver medalist(s)
Osmar Olvera	3 m springboard	443.70	4 Q	471.00	4 Q	507.50	2nd place, silver medalist(s)
Randal Willars	10 m platform	411.55	9 Q	477.55	4 Q	465.55	8
Juan Celaya; Rodrigo Diego	3 m synchro springboard	382.08	5 Q	—N/a		369.75	11
Kevin Berlín; Randal Willars	10 m synchro platform	411.78	3 Q	—N/a		434.16	3rd place, bronze medalist(s)

Women

Athlete	Event	Preliminaries		Semifinals		Final	
Athlete	Event	Points	Rank	Points	Rank	Points	Rank
Gabriela Agúndez	10 m platform	286.45	17 Q	336.55	4 Q	325.35	4
Carolina Mendoza	3 m springboard	276.15	18 Q	289.75	13	Did not advance	
Alejandra Orozco	10 m platform	318.30	6 Q	315.50	6 Q	313.40	7
Paola Pineda	1 m springboard	214.25	31	—N/a		Did not advance	
Aranza Vázquez	1 m springboard	262.20	3 Q	—N/a		285.05	3rd place, bronze medalist(s)
Aranza Vázquez	3 m springboard	218.70	39	Did not advance			
Arantxa Chávez; Paola Pineda	3 m synchro springboard	282.30	4 Q	—N/a		274.50	7
Gabriela Agúndez; Alejandra Orozco	10 m synchro platform	290.70	5 Q	—N/a		291.18	4

Mixed

Athlete	Event	Final	
Athlete	Event	Points	Rank
Jahir Ocampo; Aranza Vázquez	3 m synchro springboard	273.90	6
Diego Balleza; Viviana del Ángel	10 m synchro platform	313.44	2nd place, silver medalist(s)
Gabriela Agúndez; Jahir Ocampo; Randal Willars; Aranza Vázquez	Team event	455.35	2nd place, silver medalist(s)

== High diving ==
Athlete	Event	Points	Rank
Alejandra Aguilar	Women's high diving	204.75	15
Sergio Guzmán	Men's high diving	361.35	10
Yolotl Martínez	Men's high diving	290.90	16
Jonathan Paredes	Men's high diving	352.50	11

== Open water swimming ==
Mexico entered 6 open water swimmers.

Men

Athlete	Event	Time	Rank
Daniel Delgadillo	Men's 10 km	1:54:12.7	29
Santiago Gutiérrez	Men's 5 km	1:01:21.9	52
Paulo Strehlke	Men's 5 km	56:46.6	16
Paulo Strehlke	Men's 10 km	1:53:04.4	11

Women

Athlete	Event	Time	Rank
Paulina Alanis	Women's 10 km	2:13:16.7	44
Alejandra Hoyos	Women's 5 km	1:05:55.5	44
Martha Sandoval	Women's 5 km	1:02:26.6	32
Martha Sandoval	Women's 10 km	2:03:44.8	19

Mixed

Athlete	Event	Time	Rank
Paulina Alanis; Daniel Delgadillo; Martha Sandoval; Paulo Strehlke	Team relay	1:16:52.7	15

== Swimming ==
Mexico entered 11 swimmers.

Men

Athlete	Event	Heat		Semifinal		Final	
Athlete	Event	Time	Rank	Time	Rank	Time	Rank
Diego Camacho	50 metre backstroke	26.04	38	Did not advance			
Diego Camacho	100 metre backstroke	55.80	35	Did not advance			
Miguel de Lara	50 metre breaststroke	27.38	17	Did not advance			
Miguel de Lara	100 metre breaststroke	1:01.02	25	Did not advance			
Miguel de Lara	200 metre breaststroke	2:12.40	22	Did not advance			
Jorge Iga	50 metre freestyle	22.64	46	Did not advance			
Jorge Iga	100 metre freestyle	49.24	37	Did not advance			
Jorge Iga	200 metre freestyle	1:46.89	19	Did not advance			
Jorge Iga	50 metre butterfly	24.05	45	Did not advance			
Jorge Iga	100 metre butterfly	52.39	29	Did not advance			
Héctor Ruvalcaba	200 metre butterfly	1:57.80	22	Did not advance			
Héctor Ruvalcaba	200 metre individual medley	2:03.87	31	Did not advance			
Héctor Ruvalcaba	400 metre individual medley	4:21.25 NR	18	—N/a		Did not advance	
Diego Camacho; Miguel de Lara; Jorge Iga; Andres Dupont	4 × 100 m medley relay	3:37.25	18	—N/a		Did not advance	

Women

Athlete	Event	Heat		Semifinal		Final	
Athlete	Event	Time	Rank	Time	Rank	Time	Rank
Miranda Grana	100 metre backstroke	1:02.91	37	Did not advance			
María José Mata	200 metre freestyle	2:00.30	29	Did not advance			
María José Mata	200 metre butterfly	2:09.50	11 Q	2:09.33	12	Did not advance	
Athena Meneses	200 metre backstroke	2:15.14	26	Did not advance			
Athena Meneses	100 metre butterfly	1:00.95	32	Did not advance			
Tayde Revilak	50 metre freestyle	25.48	27	Did not advance			
Melissa Rodríguez	50 metre breaststroke	32.05	34	Did not advance			
Melissa Rodríguez	100 metre breaststroke	1:09.16	33	Did not advance			
Melissa Rodríguez	200 metre breaststroke	2:30.57	25	Did not advance			
Tayde Sansores	50 metre backstroke	28.91	32	Did not advance			
Tayde Sansores	50 metre butterfly	26.82	29	Did not advance			
Miranda Grana; Melissa Rodríguez; María José Mata; Athena Meneses	4 × 100 m medley relay	4:06.85 NR	22	—N/a		Did not advance	

Mixed

Athlete	Event	Heat		Final	
Athlete	Event	Time	Rank	Time	Rank
Jorge Iga; Andres Dupont; Athena Meneses; Tayde Revilak	4 × 100 m freestyle relay	3:30.77	19	Did not advance	
Miranda Grana; Miguel de Lara; Athena Meneses; Andres Dupont	4 × 100 m medley relay	3:53.38	18	Did not advance	
