= Artistic swimming at the 2023 World Aquatics Championships – Team free routine =

Team free routine at the 2023 World Aquatics Championships
- Venue: Marine Messe Fukuoka
- Location: Fukuoka, Japan
- Dates: 20 July (preliminary); 21 July (final)
- Competitors: 160 from 20 nations
- Teams: 20
- Winning points: 329.1687

Medalists
| gold medal | Chang Hao; Feng Yu; Wang Ciyue; Wang Liuyi; Wang Qianyi; Xiang Binxuan; Xiao Yanning; Zhang Yayi | China |
| silver medal | Moe Higa; Moeka Kijima; Uta Kobayashi; Ayano Shimada; Ami Wada; Akane Yanagisawa; Mashiro Yasunaga; Megumu Yoshida | Japan |
| bronze medal | Maryna Aleksiiva; Vladyslava Aleksiiva; Marta Fiedina; Veronika Hryshko; Daria Moshynska; Anhelina Ovchynnikova; Anastasiia Shmonina; Valeriya Tyshchenko | Ukraine |

The team free routine was an artistic swimming competition at the 2023 World Aquatics Championships was held on 20 and 21 July 2023.

== Results ==
The preliminary round was started on 20 July at 10:00. The final was held on 21 July at 19:30.

Green denotes finalists

| Rank | Nation | Preliminary | | Final | |
| Rank | Nation | Points | Rank | Points | Rank |
|---|---|---|---|---|---|
| 1st place, gold medalist(s) | China | 322.2731 | 1 | 329.1687 | 1 |
| 2nd place, silver medalist(s) | Japan | 293.4522 | 3 | 317.8085 | 2 |
| 3rd place, bronze medalist(s) | Ukraine | 275.7209 | 4 | 256.2415 | 3 |
| 4 | Spain | 294.9313 | 2 | 249.6521 | 4 |
| 5 | Israel | 251.9394 | 6 | 247.7290 | 5 |
| 6 | Italy | 233.1010 | 7 | 244.1174 | 6 |
| 7 | Greece | 221.8460 | 9 | 232.6396 | 7 |
| 8 | Australia | 191.7478 | 11 | 221.6416 | 8 |
| 9 | United States | 251.9500 | 5 | 218.6605 | 9 |
| 10 | Great Britain | 225.5188 | 8 | 217.1897 | 10 |
| 11 | Kazakhstan | 189.2292 | 12 | 185.0375 | 11 |
| 12 | Egypt | 194.4771 | 10 | 179.6291 | 12 |
| 13 | Slovakia | 188.0291 | 13 | Did not advance | |
| 14 | Chile | 182.3626 | 14 | Did not advance | |
| 15 | Germany | 181.0417 | 15 | Did not advance | |
| 16 | Thailand | 159.0417 | 16 | Did not advance | |
| 17 | New Zealand | 150.0363 | 17 | Did not advance | |
| 18 | Costa Rica | 134.3000 | 18 | Did not advance | |
| 19 | Macau | 128.5917 | 19 | Did not advance | |
| | Singapore | Did not start | | Did not advance | |
