= Artistic swimming at the 2024 World Aquatics Championships – Mixed duet technical routine =

Mixed duet technical routine at the 2024 World Aquatics Championships
- Venue: Aspire Dome
- Location: Doha, Qatar
- Dates: 3 February (preliminary); 4 February (final)
- Competitors: 26 from 13 nations
- Teams: 13
- Winning points: 228.0050

Medalists
gold medal	Nargiza Bolatova; Eduard Kim	Kazakhstan
silver medal	Cheng Wentao; Shi Haoyu	China
bronze medal	Miranda Barrera; Diego Villalobos	Mexico

The Mixed duet technical routine competition at the 2024 World Aquatics Championships was held on 3 and 4 February 2024.

== Results ==
The preliminary round was started on 3 February 2024 at 09:30. The preliminary round was started on 4 February 2024 at 20:00.

Green denotes finalists

Rank	Swimmers	Nationality	Preliminary		Final	
Rank	Swimmers	Nationality	Points	Rank	Points	Rank
1st place, gold medalist(s)	Nargiza Bolatova; Eduard Kim	Kazakhstan	233.3217	4	228.0050	1
2nd place, silver medalist(s)	Cheng Wentao; Shi Haoyu	China	250.5150	1	223.3166	2
3rd place, bronze medalist(s)	Miranda Barrera; Diego Villalobos	Mexico	217.6450	5	217.5192	3
4	Dennis González; Mireia Hernández	Spain	237.6200	3	214.4833	4
5	Nicolás Campos; Theodora Garrido	Chile	217.3200	6	214.2950	5
6	Giorgio Minisini; Susanna Pedotti	Italy	248.8633	2	204.3316	6
7	Sandra Freund; David Martinez	Sweden	199.0434	8	199.9283	7
8	Jennifer Cerquera; Gustavo Sánchez	Colombia	214.9517	7	197.3592	8
9	Bernardo Santos; Anna Giulia Veloso	Brazil	196.6817	9	196.6433	9
10	Jelena Kontić; Ivan Martinović	Serbia	187.8333	10	186.0100	10
11	Kantinan Adisaisiributr; Voranan Toomchay	Thailand	187.0349	11	183.6733	11
12	Hristina Cherkezova; Dimitar Isaev	Bulgaria	151.0600	12	155.3433	12
13	Andy Ávila; Carelys Valdés	Cuba	146.6900	13	Did not advance	
