= Chile at the 2024 World Aquatics Championships =

- Flag of Chile
- World Aquatics code: CHI
- National federation: Chilean Federation of Aquatics Sport

in Doha, Qatar
- Competitors: 12 in 3 sports
- Medals: Gold 0 Silver 0 Bronze 0 Total 0

World Aquatics Championships appearances
- 1973; 1975; 1978; 1982; 1986; 1991; 1994; 1998; 2001; 2003; 2005; 2007; 2009; 2011; 2013; 2015; 2017; 2019; 2022; 2023; 2024; 2025

Chile competed at the 2024 World Aquatics Championships in Doha, Qatar from 2 to 18 February.

== Competitors ==
The following is the list of competitors in the Championships.

Sport	Men	Women	Total
Artistic swimming	1	7	8
Diving	1	0	1
Swimming	2	1	3
Total	4	8	12

== Artistic swimming ==
Men

Athlete	Event	Preliminaries		Final	
Athlete	Event	Points	Rank	Points	Rank
Nicolás Campos	Solo technical routine	204.1083	7 Q	203.8483	8

Women

Athlete	Event	Preliminaries		Final	
Athlete	Event	Points	Rank	Points	Rank
Soledad García; Trinidad García	Duet technical routine	214.1434	17	Did not advance	

Mixed

Athlete	Event	Preliminaries		Final	
Athlete	Event	Points	Rank	Points	Rank
Nicolás Campos; Trinidad García	Duet technical routine	217.3200	6 Q	214.2950	5
Nicolás Campos; Soledad García; Trinidad García; Theodora Garrido; Macarena Lagos; Josefa Morales; Fiona Prieto; Rocío Vargas	Team acrobatic routine	182.6333	12 Q	186.8766	11

== Diving ==
Men

Athlete	Event	Preliminaries		Semifinals		Final	
Athlete	Event	Points	Rank	Points	Rank	Points	Rank
Donato Neglia	1 m springboard	289.65	25	—N/a		Did not advance	
Donato Neglia	3 m springboard	Did not finish		Did not advance			

== Swimming ==
Chile entered 3 swimmers.

Men

Athlete	Event	Heat		Semifinal		Final	
Athlete	Event	Time	Rank	Time	Rank	Time	Rank
Benjamin Schnapp	100 metre freestyle	51.29	44	Did not advance			
Benjamin Schnapp	100 metre butterfly	53.77 NR	33	Did not advance			
Vicente Villanueva	100 metre breaststroke	1:03.91	50	Did not advance			
Vicente Villanueva	200 metre breaststroke	2:17.45	24	Did not advance			

Women

Athlete	Event	Heat		Semifinal		Final	
Athlete	Event	Time	Rank	Time	Rank	Time	Rank
Kristel Köbrich	800 metre freestyle	8:38.81	14	—N/a		Did not advance	
Kristel Köbrich	1500 metre freestyle	16:16.62	8 Q	—N/a		16:18.90	8
