= Cuba at the 2023 World Aquatics Championships =

- Flag of Cuba
- World Aquatics code: CUB
- National federation: Federación Cubana de Natación

in Fukuoka, Japan
- Competitors: 12 in 3 sports
- Medals: Gold 0 Silver 0 Bronze 0 Total 0

World Aquatics Championships appearances
- 1973; 1975; 1978; 1982; 1986; 1991; 1994; 1998; 2001; 2003; 2005; 2007; 2009; 2011; 2013; 2015; 2017; 2019; 2022; 2023; 2024; 2025

Cuba is set to compete at the 2023 World Aquatics Championships in Fukuoka, Japan from 14 to 30 July.

== Artistic swimming ==
Cuba entered 4 artistic swimmers.

Men

Athlete	Event	Preliminaries		Final	
Athlete	Event	Points	Rank	Points	Rank
Andy Ávila	Solo technical routine	128.4033	9 Q	136.3867	10
Andy Ávila	Solo free routine	84.8166	10 Q	95.6146	9

Women

Athlete	Event	Preliminaries		Final	
Athlete	Event	Points	Rank	Points	Rank
Gabriela Alpajón	Solo technical routine	160.7934	25	Did not advance	
Gabriela Alpajón	Solo free routine	107.2771	28	Did not advance	
Gabriela Alpajón; Dayaris Varona	Duet technical routine	156.8600	35	Did not advance	
Gabriela Alpajón; Dayaris Varona	Duet free routine	112.3021	33	Did not advance	

Mixed

Athlete	Event	Preliminaries		Final	
Athlete	Event	Points	Rank	Points	Rank
Andy Ávila; Carelys Valdes	Duet technical routine	108.1650	16	Did not advance	
Andy Ávila; Carelys Valdes	Duet free routine	78.4522	15	Did not advance	

== Diving ==
Cuba entered 4 divers.

Men

Athlete	Event	Preliminaries		Semifinal		Final	
Athlete	Event	Points	Rank	Points	Rank	Points	Rank
Carlos Escalona	1 m springboard	316.30	24	—N/a		Did not advance	
Carlos Escalona	3 m springboard	369.55	21	Did not advance			
Carlos Ramos	10 m platform	344.95	26	Did not advance			

Women

Athlete	Event	Preliminaries		Semifinal		Final	
Athlete	Event	Points	Rank	Points	Rank	Points	Rank
Anisley García	1 m springboard	226.30	24	—N/a		Did not advance	
Anisley García	3 m springboard	254.10	28	Did not advance			
Anisley García	10 m platform	278.90	20	Did not advance			
Prisis Ruiz	1 m springboard	181.15	43	—N/a		Did not advance	
Prisis Ruiz	3 m springboard	250.80	31	Did not advance			
Anisley García; Prisis Ruiz	3 m synchro springboard	232.80	15	—N/a		Did not advance	

Mixed

Athlete	Event	Final	
Athlete	Event	Points	Rank
Anisley García; Carlos Ramos	10 m synchro platform	262.05	8
Anisley García; Carlos Escalona; Prisis Ruiz; Carlos Ramos	Team event	341.50	9

== Swimming ==
Cuba entered 4 swimmers.

Men

Athlete	Event	Heat		Semifinal		Final	
Athlete	Event	Time	Rank	Time	Rank	Time	Rank
Julio Calero Suarez	50 metre breaststroke	28.97	41	Did not advance			
Julio Calero Suarez	100 metre breaststroke	1:04.51	55	Did not advance			
Rodolfo Falcón Jr	800 metre freestyle	8:20.35	36	—N/a		Did not advance	
Rodolfo Falcón Jr	1500 metre freestyle	15:49.72	26	—N/a		Did not advance	

Women

Athlete	Event	Heat		Semifinal		Final	
Athlete	Event	Time	Rank	Time	Rank	Time	Rank
Andrea Becali	100 metre backstroke	1:04.27	42	Did not advance			
Andrea Becali	200 metre backstroke	2:18.65	31	Did not advance			
Elisbet Gámez	100 metre freestyle	55.40	24	Did not advance			
Elisbet Gámez	200 metre freestyle	1:59.98	28	Did not advance			
