= Poland at the 2023 World Aquatics Championships =

- Flag of Poland
- FINA code: POL
- National federation: Polish Swimming Federation
- Website: polswim.pl (in Polish)

in Fukuoka, Japan
- Competitors: 17 in 2 sports
- Medals Ranked 21st: Gold 0 Silver 1 Bronze 0 Total 1

World Aquatics Championships appearances
- 1973; 1975; 1978; 1982; 1986; 1991; 1994; 1998; 2001; 2003; 2005; 2007; 2009; 2011; 2013; 2015; 2017; 2019; 2022; 2023; 2024

Poland is set to compete at the 2023 World Aquatics Championships in Fukuoka, Japan from 14 to 30 July.

== Medalists ==
Medal	Name	Sport	Event	Date
Silver	Krzysztof Chmielewski	Swimming	Men's 200 m butterfly	July 26

== Athletes by discipline ==
The following is the list of number of competitors participating at the Championships per discipline.

Sport	Men	Women	Total
Diving	4	1	5
Swimming	6	6	12
Total	10	7	17

== Diving ==
Poland entered 5 divers.

Men

Athlete	Event	Preliminaries		Semifinals		Final	
Athlete	Event	Points	Rank	Points	Rank	Points	Rank
Filip Jachim	10 m platform	315.90	36	Did not advance			
Kacper Lesiak	1 m springboard	353.85	16	—		Did not advance	
Kacper Lesiak	3 m springboard	339.85	39	Did not advance			
Robert Łukaszewicz	10 m platform	358.60	22	Did not advance			
Andrzej Rzeszutek	1 m springboard	316.05	25	—		Did not advance	
Andrzej Rzeszutek	3 m springboard	364.70	26	Did not advance			
Kacper Lesiak; Andrzej Rzeszutek	3 m synchro springboard	349.29	9 Q	—		370.50	9
Filip Jachim; Robert Łukaszewicz	10 m synchro platform	360.21	9 Q	—		371.58	7

Women

Athlete	Event	Preliminaries		Semifinals		Final	
Athlete	Event	Points	Rank	Points	Rank	Points	Rank
Kaja Skrzek	1 m springboard	229.45	18	—		Did not advance	
Kaja Skrzek	3 m springboard	233.55	33	Did not advance			

Mixed

Athlete	Event	Final	
Athlete	Event	Points	Rank
Andrzej Rzeszutek; Kaja Skrzek	3 m synchro springboard	255.15	10

== Swimming ==
Poland entered 12 swimmers.

Men

Athlete	Event	Heat		Semifinal		Final	
Athlete	Event	Time	Rank	Time	Rank	Time	Rank
Krzysztof Chmielewski	400 m freestyle	3:49.90	22	—		Did not advance	
Krzysztof Chmielewski	200 m butterfly	1:55.02	3 Q	1:54.36	4 Q	1:53.62	2nd place, silver medalist(s)
Adrian Jaśkiewicz	50 m butterfly	23.84	38	Did not advance			
Adrian Jaśkiewicz	100 metre butterfly	52.10	23	Did not advance			
Ksawery Masiuk	50 m backstroke	24.71	4 Q	24.47	4 Q	24.57	4
Ksawery Masiuk	100 m backstroke	53.15	3 Q	53.20	7 Q	52.92	6
Ksawery Masiuk	200 m backstroke	Did not start					
Kamil Sieradzki	50 m freestyle	22.59	44	Did not advance			
Kamil Sieradzki	100 m freestyle	48.80	29	Did not advance			
Kamil Sieradzki	200 m freestyle	1:47.34	25	Did not advance			
Kacper Stokowski	50 m backstroke	24.91	10 Q	24.99	11	Did not advance	
Kacper Stokowski	100 m backstroke	53.81	12 Q	53.96	14	Did not advance	
Dawid Wiekiera	100 m breaststroke	1:00.89	22	Did not advance			
Dawid Wiekiera	200 m breaststroke	2:11.92	17	Did not advance			
Kamil Sieradzki; Kacper Stokowski; Adrian Jaśkiewicz; Ksawery Masiuk	4 × 100 m freestyle relay	3:15.55	14	—		Did not advance	
Ksawery Masiuk; Dawid Wiekiera; Adrian Jaśkiewicz; Kamil Sieradzki	4 × 100 m medley relay	3:34.66	12	—		Did not advance	

Women

Athlete	Event	Heat		Semifinal		Final	
Athlete	Event	Time	Rank	Time	Rank	Time	Rank
Laura Bernat	200 m freestyle	Disqualified		Did not advance			
Laura Bernat	200 m backstroke	2:09.08 NR	3 Q	2:08.96 NR	6	2:10.68	7
Kornelia Fiedkiewicz	100 m freestyle	54.82	19	Did not advance			
Paulina Peda	50 m backstroke	28.40	19	Did not advance			
Paulina Peda	100 m backstroke	1:01.40	26	Did not advance			
Paulina Peda	50 m butterfly	26.71	26	Did not advance			
Paulina Peda	100 m butterfly	59.34	21	Did not advance			
Adela Piskorska	50 m backstroke	28.35	18	Did not advance			
Adela Piskorska	100 m backstroke	1:00.51	17	Did not advance			
Adela Piskorska	200 m backstroke	2:13.74	22	Did not advance			
Dominika Sztandera	50 m breaststroke	30.68	13 Q	30.59	14	Did not advance	
Dominika Sztandera	100 m breaststroke	1:06.42 NR	7Q	1:07.13	16	Did not advance	
Katarzyna Wasick	50 m freestyle	24.71	9 Q	24.72	12	Did not advance	
Adela Piskorska; Dominika Sztandera; Paulina Peda; Kornelia Fiedkiewicz	4 × 100 m medley relay	4:00.23 NR	10	—		Did not advance	

Mixed

Athlete	Event	Heat		Final	
Athlete	Event	Time	Rank	Time	Rank
Ksawery Masiuk; Dominika Sztandera; Adrian Jaśkiewicz; Kornelia Fiedkiewicz	4 × 100 m medley relay	3:46.29	12	Did not advance	
