= Kazakhstan at the 2024 World Aquatics Championships =

- Flag of Kazakhstan
- FINA code: KAZ
- National federation: Swimming Federation of the Republic of Kazakhstan
- Website: aquatics.kz

in Doha, Qatar
- Competitors: 57 in 5 sports
- Medals Ranked 23rd: Gold 1 Silver 0 Bronze 0 Total 1

World Aquatics Championships appearances
- 1994; 1998; 2001; 2003; 2005; 2007; 2009; 2011; 2013; 2015; 2017; 2019; 2022; 2023; 2024

Other related appearances
- Soviet Union (1973–1991)

Kazakhstan competed at the 2024 World Aquatics Championships in Doha, Qatar from 2 to 18 February.

== Medalists ==
Medal	Name	Sport	Event	Date
1st place, gold medalist(s)	Nargiza Bolatova; Eduard Kim	Artistic swimming	Mixed duet technical routine	4 February 2024

== Competitors ==
The following is the list of competitors in the Championships.

Sport	Men	Women	Total
Artistic swimming	1	12	13
Diving	2	0	2
Open water swimming	3	3*	6*
Swimming	4	4*	8*
Water polo	14	15	29
Total	24	33*	57*

Diana Taszhanova competed in both open water swimming and pool swimming.

== Artistic swimming ==
Men

Athlete	Event	Preliminaries		Final	
Athlete	Event	Points	Rank	Points	Rank
Eduard Kim	Solo technical routine	214.4384	5 Q	215.9483	6

Women

Athlete	Event	Preliminaries		Final	
Athlete	Event	Points	Rank	Points	Rank
Karina Magrupova	Solo technical routine	219.8800	12 Q	199.9433	12
Karina Magrupova	Solo free routine	200.6688	9 Q	200.8166	9
Arina Pushkina; Yasmin Tuyakova	Duet technical routine	222.3934	23	Did not advance	
Arina Pushkina; Yasmin Tuyakova	Duet free routine	188.3146	14	Did not advance	

Mixed

Athlete	Event	Preliminaries		Final	
Athlete	Event	Points	Rank	Points	Rank
Nargiza Bolatova; Eduard Kim	Duet technical routine	233.3217	4 Q	228.0050	1st place, gold medalist(s)
Nargiza Bolatova; Eduard Kim	Duet free routine	140.8416	7 Q	170.6875	5
Eteri Kakutia; Aigerim Kurmangaliyeva; Karina Magrupova; Xeniya Makarova; Arina Myasnikova; Anna Pavletsova; Zhaklin Yakimova; Zhaniya Zhiyengazy	Team technical routine	212.8557	10 Q	223.2108	9
Eteri Kakutia; Aigerim Kurmangaliyeva; Xeniya Makarova; Arina Myasnikova; Anna Pavletsova; Valeriya Stolbunova; Zhaklin Yakimova; Zhaniya Zhiyengazy	Team free routine	213.4418	12 Q	208.2312	12
Nargiza Bolatova; Eteri Kakutia; Aigerim Kurmangaliyeva; Xeniya Makarova; Arina Myasnikova; Anna Pavletsova; Zhaklin Yakimova; Zhaniya Zhiyengazy	Team acrobatic routine	177.1933	13	Did not advance	

== Diving ==
Men

Athlete	Event	Preliminaries		Semifinals		Final	
Athlete	Event	Points	Rank	Points	Rank	Points	Rank
Nazar Kozhanov	3 m springboard	202.25	66	Did not advance			
Nazar Kozhanov; Kirill Novikov	3 m synchro springboard	—				232.29	25

== Open water swimming ==
Men

Athlete	Event	Time	Rank
Daniil Androssov	Men's 10 km	2:03:37.2	69
Galymzhan Balabek	Men's 5 km	55:23.2	50
Lev Cherepanov	Men's 5 km	53:26.0	26
Lev Cherepanov	Men's 10 km	1:55:24.7	59

Women

Athlete	Event	Time	Rank
Mariya Fedotova	Women's 10 km	2:16:01.9	57
Darya Pushko	Women's 5 km	1:04:55.2	47
Diana Taszhanova	Women's 5 km	1:01:20.7	41
Diana Taszhanova	Women's 10 km	2:17:32.7	58

Mixed

Athlete	Event	Time	Rank
Galymzhan Balabek; Diana Taszhanova; Mariya Fedotova; Lev Cherepanov	Team relay	1:10:44.2	19

== Swimming ==
Kazakhstan entered 8 swimmers.

Men

Athlete	Event	Heat		Semifinal		Final	
Athlete	Event	Time	Rank	Time	Rank	Time	Rank
Arsen Kozhakhmetov	50 metre breaststroke	28.59	32	Did not advance			
Arsen Kozhakhmetov	100 metre breaststroke	1:02.53	37	Did not advance			
Adilbek Mussin	100 metre freestyle	49.45	31	Did not advance			
Adilbek Mussin	100 metre butterfly	51.75	4 Q	52.06	11	Did not advance	
Yegor Popov	100 metre backstroke	56.59	33	Did not advance			
Yegor Popov	200 metre backstroke	2:01.61	22	Did not advance			
Maxim Skazobtsov	50 metre butterfly	24.23	34	Did not advance			
Maxim Skazobtsov	200 metre butterfly	2:05.49	34	Did not advance			
Yegor Popov; Arsen Kozhakhmetov; Maxim Skazobtsov; Adilbek Mussin	4 × 100 m medley relay	3:39.21	19	—		Did not advance	

Women

Athlete	Event	Heat		Semifinal		Final	
Athlete	Event	Time	Rank	Time	Rank	Time	Rank
Xeniya Ignatova	50 metre backstroke	29.40	30	Did not advance			
Xeniya Ignatova	100 metre backstroke	1:02.83	29	Did not advance			
Xeniya Ignatova	200 metre backstroke	2:14.22	19	Did not advance			
Adelaida Pchelintseva	50 metre breaststroke	Disqualified		Did not advance			
Adelaida Pchelintseva	100 metre breaststroke	1:10.16	30	Did not advance			
Sofia Spodarenko	50 metre butterfly	26.38	15 Q	26.46	15	Did not advance	
Sofia Spodarenko	100 metre butterfly	1:00.39	24	Did not advance			
Diana Taszhanova	400 metre freestyle	4:18.15	23	—		Did not advance	
Diana Taszhanova	800 metre freestyle	8:55.78	23	—		Did not advance	
Xeniya Ignatova; Adelaida Pchelintseva; Sofia Spodarenko; Diana Taszhanova	4 × 100 m medley relay	4:13.92	18	—		Did not advance	

Mixed

Athlete	Event	Heat		Semifinal		Final	
Athlete	Event	Time	Rank	Time	Rank	Time	Rank
Xeniya Ignatova; Arsen Korzhakhmetov; Sofia Spodarenko; Adilbek Mussin	4 × 100 m medley relay	3:54.45	17	—		Did not advance	

== Water polo ==
Summary

Team	Event	Group stage				Playoff	Quarterfinal	Semifinal	Final / BM	
Team	Event	Opposition Score	Opposition Score	Opposition Score	Rank	Opposition Score	Opposition Score	Opposition Score	Opposition Score	Rank
Kazakhstan	Men's tournament	Italy; L 3–33	Romania; L 3–25	Hungary; L 1–28	4	—	—	Japan; L 4–17	South Africa; L 10–11	16
Kazakhstan	Women's tournament	Brazil; W 16–15	Netherlands; L 4–27	United States; L 4–32	3 QP	Greece; L 5–24	—	New Zealand; L 8–23	Great Britain; L 6-8	12

=== Men's tournament ===
Team roster

The following is the Kazakh roster.

Head coach: Rustam Ukumanov

- 1 Temirlan Balfanbayev GK
- 2 Eduard Tsoy FP
- 3 Alexandr Yeremin FP
- 4 Yegor Beloussov FP
- 5 Maxim Lamayev FP
- 6 Vladimir Yurtayev FP
- 7 Anatoliy Pustovalov FP
- 8 Tamir Gribov FP
- 9 Ruslan Akhmetov FP
- 10 Igor Nedokontsev FP
- 11 Kirill Panteleyev FP
- 12 Sultan Shonzhigitov FP
- 13 Akzhan Aday GK
- 14 Nurzhas Nurtaza FP

Group play

Pos	Team	Pld	W	PSW	PSL	L	GF	GA	GD	Pts	Qualification
1	Hungary	3	2	1	0	0	52	18	+34	8	Quarterfinals
2	Italy	3	2	0	1	0	58	22	+36	7	Playoffs
3	Romania	3	1	0	0	2	43	34	+9	3	Playoffs
4	Kazakhstan	3	0	0	0	3	7	86	−79	0	13–16th place semifinals

Source: World Aquatics
Rules for classification: 1) points; 2) head-to-head points; 3) head-to-head goal difference; 4) head-to-head number of goals scored; 5) Goal difference.

5 February 2024; 19:00	Report	Italy	33–3	Kazakhstan	Aspire Dome, Doha; Referees: Zhang Liang (CHN), Matan Schwartz (ISR)
5 February 2024; 19:00	Report	Score by quarters: 6–1, 10–1, 8–1, 9–0			Aspire Dome, Doha; Referees: Zhang Liang (CHN), Matan Schwartz (ISR)
5 February 2024; 19:00	Report	Cannella, Fondelli 7	Goals	three players 1	Aspire Dome, Doha; Referees: Zhang Liang (CHN), Matan Schwartz (ISR)

7 February 2024; 16:00	Report	Kazakhstan	3–25	Romania	Aspire Dome, Doha; Referees: Zhang Liang (CHN), Matan Schwartz (ISR)
7 February 2024; 16:00	Report	Score by quarters: 1–7, 1–6, 0–5, 1–7			Aspire Dome, Doha; Referees: Zhang Liang (CHN), Matan Schwartz (ISR)
7 February 2024; 16:00	Report	three players 1	Goals	Fulea, Prioteasa 5	Aspire Dome, Doha; Referees: Zhang Liang (CHN), Matan Schwartz (ISR)

9 February 2024; 10:30	Report	Kazakhstan	1–28	Hungary	Aspire Dome, Doha; Referees: Hélène Painchaud (CAN), Cheng Beng Guan (SGP)
9 February 2024; 10:30	Report	Score by quarters: 0–8, 0–5, 0–8, 1–7			Aspire Dome, Doha; Referees: Hélène Painchaud (CAN), Cheng Beng Guan (SGP)
9 February 2024; 10:30	Report	Yeremin 1	Goals	Vigvári 5	Aspire Dome, Doha; Referees: Hélène Painchaud (CAN), Cheng Beng Guan (SGP)

13–16th place semifinals

11 February 2024; 10:30	Report	Japan	17–4	Kazakhstan	Aspire Dome, Doha; Referees: Natalia Markopoulou (GRE), Jennifer McCall (USA)
11 February 2024; 10:30	Report	Score by quarters: 3–2, 5–0, 5–2, 4–0			Aspire Dome, Doha; Referees: Natalia Markopoulou (GRE), Jennifer McCall (USA)
11 February 2024; 10:30	Report	Inaba 3	Goals	four players 1	Aspire Dome, Doha; Referees: Natalia Markopoulou (GRE), Jennifer McCall (USA)

15th place game

13 February 2024; 09:00	Report	South Africa	11–10	Kazakhstan	Aspire Dome, Doha; Referees: David Couper (NZL), Asumi Tsuzaki (JPN)
13 February 2024; 09:00	Report	Score by quarters: 3–0, 4–3, 1–4, 3–3			Aspire Dome, Doha; Referees: David Couper (NZL), Asumi Tsuzaki (JPN)
13 February 2024; 09:00	Report	Swanepoel 4	Goals	Akhmetov 3	Aspire Dome, Doha; Referees: David Couper (NZL), Asumi Tsuzaki (JPN)

=== Women's tournament ===
Team roster

The following is the Kazakh roster.

Head coach: Marina Pertseva

- 1 Valeriya Kolesnichenko GK
- 2 Darya Pochinok FP
- 3 Anastasiya Glukhova FP
- 4 Viktoriya Kaplun FP
- 5 Valeriya Anossova FP
- 6 Madina Rakhmanova FP
- 7 Anna Novikova FP
- 8 Yelizaveta Rudneva FP
- 9 Milena Nabiyeva FP
- 10 Viktoriya Khritankova FP
- 11 Anastassiya Mirshina FP
- 12 Anastassiya Tsoy FP
- 13 Mariya Martynenko GK
- 14 Yuliya Druzhinina FP
- 15 Olga Vorontsova FP

Group play

Pos	Team	Pld	W	PSW	PSL	L	GF	GA	GD	Pts	Qualification
1	United States	3	3	0	0	0	63	16	+47	9	Quarterfinals
2	Netherlands	3	2	0	0	1	62	19	+43	6	Playoffs
3	Kazakhstan	3	0	1	0	2	17	69	−52	2	Playoffs
4	Brazil	3	0	0	1	2	20	58	−38	1	13–16th place semifinals

Source: World Aquatics
Rules for classification: 1) points; 2) head-to-head points; 3) head-to-head goal difference; 4) head-to-head number of goals scored; 5) Goal difference.

4 February 2024; 09:00	Report	Kazakhstan	16–15	Brazil	Aspire Dome, Doha; Referees: Tamas Couper (NZL), Matan Painchaud (CAN)
4 February 2024; 09:00	Report	Score by quarters: 1–2, 2–2, 5–3, 2–3 PSO: 6–5			Aspire Dome, Doha; Referees: Tamas Couper (NZL), Matan Painchaud (CAN)
4 February 2024; 09:00	Report	Novikova, Pochinok 3	Goals	Cavalcante 4	Aspire Dome, Doha; Referees: Tamas Couper (NZL), Matan Painchaud (CAN)

6 February 2024; 17:30	Report	Netherlands	27–4	Kazakhstan	Aspire Dome, Doha; Referees: David Couper (NZL), Asumi Tsuzaki (JPN)
6 February 2024; 17:30	Report	Score by quarters: 6–0, 4–1, 8–3, 9–0			Aspire Dome, Doha; Referees: David Couper (NZL), Asumi Tsuzaki (JPN)
6 February 2024; 17:30	Report	Joustra 7	Goals	Tsoy 2	Aspire Dome, Doha; Referees: David Couper (NZL), Asumi Tsuzaki (JPN)

8 February 2024; 16:00	Report	Brazil	5–27	Netherlands	Aspire Dome, Doha; Referees: Giuliana Nicolosi (ITA), David Couper (NZL)
8 February 2024; 16:00	Report	Score by quarters: 1–7, 1–4, 2–7, 1–9			Aspire Dome, Doha; Referees: Giuliana Nicolosi (ITA), David Couper (NZL)
8 February 2024; 16:00	Report	Ferreira 2	Goals	three players 5	Aspire Dome, Doha; Referees: Giuliana Nicolosi (ITA), David Couper (NZL)

Playoffs

10 February 2024; 16:00	Report	Kazakhstan	5–24	Greece	Aspire Dome, Doha; Referees: Ashleigh Kaeshler (AUS), Cheng Beng Guan (SGP)
10 February 2024; 16:00	Report	Score by quarters: 2–8, 0–4, 1–7, 2–5			Aspire Dome, Doha; Referees: Ashleigh Kaeshler (AUS), Cheng Beng Guan (SGP)
10 February 2024; 16:00	Report	five players 1	Goals	Ninou 4	Aspire Dome, Doha; Referees: Ashleigh Kaeshler (AUS), Cheng Beng Guan (SGP)

9–12th place semifinals

12 February 2024; 13:30	Report	Kazakhstan	8–23	New Zealand	Aspire Dome, Doha; Referees: Giuliana Nicolosi (ITA), Hélène Painchaud (CAN)
12 February 2024; 13:30	Report	Score by quarters: 2–6, 1–5, 3–7, 2–5			Aspire Dome, Doha; Referees: Giuliana Nicolosi (ITA), Hélène Painchaud (CAN)
12 February 2024; 13:30	Report	Mirshina 3	Goals	McDowall 11	Aspire Dome, Doha; Referees: Giuliana Nicolosi (ITA), Hélène Painchaud (CAN)

Eleventh place game

14 February 2024; 09:00	Report	Great Britain	8–6	Kazakhstan	Aspire Dome, Doha; Referees: Cheng Beng Guan (SGP), Asumi Tsuzaki (JPN)
14 February 2024; 09:00	Report	Score by quarters: 3–1, 2–2, 0–3, 3–0			Aspire Dome, Doha; Referees: Cheng Beng Guan (SGP), Asumi Tsuzaki (JPN)
14 February 2024; 09:00	Report	Tafazolli 4	Goals	Novikova, Rakhmanova 2	Aspire Dome, Doha; Referees: Cheng Beng Guan (SGP), Asumi Tsuzaki (JPN)
