= Diving at the 2023 World Aquatics Championships – Men's 1 metre springboard =

Men's 1 metre springboard at the 2023 World Aquatics Championships
- Venue: Fukuoka Prefectural Pool
- Location: Fukuoka, Japan
- Dates: 14 July (preliminary); 16 July (final)
- Competitors: 63 from 41 nations
- Winning points: 440.45

Medalists
gold medal	Peng Jianfeng	China
silver medal	Osmar Olvera	Mexico
bronze medal	Zheng Jiuyuan	China

The men's 1 metre springboard competition at the 2023 World Aquatics Championships was held on 14 and 16 July 2023.

== Results ==
The preliminary round was started on 14 July at 15:00. The final was held on 16 July at 14:30.

Green denotes finalists

Rank	Diver	Nationality	Preliminary		Final	
Rank	Diver	Nationality	Points	Rank	Points	Rank
1st place, gold medalist(s)	Peng Jianfeng	China	403.75	1	440.45	1
2nd place, silver medalist(s)	Osmar Olvera	Mexico	395.85	2	428.85	2
3rd place, bronze medalist(s)	Zheng Jiuyuan	China	371.65	5	418.30	3
4	Juan Celaya	Mexico	362.30	10	406.25	4
5	Li Shixin	Australia	374.50	4	400.55	5
6	Moritz Wesemann	Germany	364.45	7	388.55	6
7	Woo Ha-ram	South Korea	362.65	9	385.50	7
8	Jordan Houlden	Great Britain	374.90	3	382.90	8
9	Jack Ryan	United States	363.75	8	376.35	9
10	Jules Bouyer	France	361.50	11	374.15	10
11	Danylo Konovalov	Ukraine	360.25	12	354.15	11
12	Jonathan Suckow	Switzerland	369.00	6	349.40	12
13	Lyle Yost	United States	355.05	13	Did not advance	
14	Giovanni Tocci	Italy	354.00	14	Did not advance	
15	Jonathan Ruvalcaba	Dominican Republic	353.85	15	Did not advance	
16	Kacper Lesiak	Poland	353.85	16	Did not advance	
17	Jake Passmore	Ireland	344.60	17	Did not advance	
18	Lorenzo Marsaglia	Italy	340.70	18	Did not advance	
19	Dariush Lotfi	Austria	327.15	19	Did not advance	
20	Luis Uribe	Colombia	327.10	20	Did not advance	
21	Alexis Jandard	France	322.70	21	Did not advance	
22	Yona Knight-Wisdom	Jamaica	319.20	22	Did not advance	
23	Daniel Restrepo	Colombia	318.35	23	Did not advance	
24	Carlos Escalona	Cuba	316.30	24	Did not advance	
25	Andrzej Rzeszutek	Poland	316.05	25	Did not advance	
26	Jesús Liranzo	Peru	313.50	26	Did not advance	
27	Rafael Fogaça	Brazil	311.35	27	Did not advance	
28	Bryden Hattie	Canada	311.30	28	Did not advance	
29	Adrián Abadía	Spain	311.15	29	Did not advance	
30	Alexander Lube	Germany	309.70	30	Did not advance	
31	Rikuto Tamai	Japan	298.60	31	Did not advance	
32	Nikolaj Schaller	Austria	297.00	32	Did not advance	
33	Martynas Lisauskas	Lithuania	295.10	33	Did not advance	
34	Avvir Tham	Singapore	291.65	34	Did not advance	
35	Elias Petersen	Sweden	291.20	35	Did not advance	
36	Jesús González	Venezuela	290.50	36	Did not advance	
37	Frandiel Gómez	Dominican Republic	289.60	37	Did not advance	
38	David Ledinski	Croatia	288.55	38	Did not advance	
39	Mohamed Farouk	Egypt	287.70	39	Did not advance	
40	Rafael Max	Brazil	285.65	40	Did not advance	
41	Donato Neglia	Chile	283.85	41	Did not advance	
42	David Ekdahl	Sweden	282.20	42	Did not advance	
43	Isak Børslien	Norway	280.45	43	Did not advance	
44	Alberto Arévalo	Spain	279.00	44	Did not advance	
45	Yohan Eskrick-Parkinson	Jamaica	277.05	45	Did not advance	
46	Alexandru Avasiloae	Romania	275.40	46	Did not advance	
47	Tornike Onikashvili	Georgia	275.35	47	Did not advance	
48	Irakli Sakandelidze	Georgia	263.10	48	Did not advance	
49	Matej Neveščanin	Croatia	257.55	49	Did not advance	
50	Kim Yeong-taek	South Korea	256.00	50	Did not advance	
51	Hanis Nazirul Jaya Surya	Malaysia	250.10	51	Did not advance	
52	Mohamed Noaman	Egypt	248.50	52	Did not advance	
53	Gabriel Gilbert Daim	Malaysia	242.95	53	Did not advance	
54	Athanasios Tsirikos	Greece	240.75	54	Did not advance	
55	Curtis Yuen	Hong Kong	237.05	55	Did not advance	
56	Hemam London Singh	India	235.65	56	Did not advance	
57	Adityo Restu Putra	Indonesia	232.80	57	Did not advance	
58	Thibaud Bucher	Switzerland	231.75	58	Did not advance	
59	Diego Carquín	Chile	224.80	59	Did not advance	
60	Maori Pomeroy-Farrell	Fiji	224.00	60	Did not advance	
61	Stefan Steenkamp	South Africa	219.30	61	Did not advance	
62	Sebastian Konecki	Lithuania	216.45	62	Did not advance	
63	Abdulrahman Abbas	Kuwait	201.80	63	Did not advance	
