= Cuba at the 2024 World Aquatics Championships =

- Flag of Colombia
- FINA code: CUB
- National federation: Federación Cubana de Natación

in Doha, Qatar
- Competitors: 11 in 3 sports
- Medals: Gold 0 Silver 0 Bronze 0 Total 0

World Aquatics Championships appearances
- 1973; 1975; 1978; 1982; 1986; 1991; 1994; 1998; 2001; 2003; 2005; 2007; 2009; 2011; 2013; 2015; 2017; 2019; 2022; 2023; 2024

Cuba competed at the 2024 World Aquatics Championships in Doha, Qatar from 2 to 18 February.

== Competitors ==
The following is the list of competitors in the Championships.

Sport	Men	Women	Total
Artistic swimming	1	3	4
Diving	2	2	4
Swimming	1	2	3
Total	4	7	11

== Artistic swimming ==
Men

Athlete	Event	Preliminaries		Final	
Athlete	Event	Points	Rank	Points	Rank
Andy Ávila	Solo technical routine	141.9067	13	Did not advance	
Andy Ávila	Solo free routine	95.0625	9 Q	111.9460	9

Women

Athlete	Event	Preliminaries		Final	
Athlete	Event	Points	Rank	Points	Rank
Gabriela Alpajón	Solo technical routine	173.6300	23	Did not advance	
Gabriela Alpajón	Solo free routine	126.7458	25	Did not advance	
Gabriela Alpajón; Dayaris Varona	Duet technical routine	172.9066	37	Did not advance	
Gabriela Alpajón; Dayaris Varona	Duet free routine	100.2688	36	Did not advance	

Mixed

Athlete	Event	Preliminaries		Final	
Athlete	Event	Points	Rank	Points	Rank
Andy Ávila; Carelys Valdés	Duet technical routine	146.6900	13	Did not advance	
Andy Ávila; Carelys Valdés	Duet free routine	75.6249	10 Q	96.8334	9

== Diving ==
Men

Athlete	Event	Preliminaries		Semifinals		Final	
Athlete	Event	Points	Rank	Points	Rank	Points	Rank
Carlos Ramos	10 m platform	329.45	30	Did not advance			
Frank Rosales	1 m springboard	317.40	15	—		Did not advance	
Frank Rosales	3 m springboard	272.70	56	Did not advance			

Women

Athlete	Event	Preliminaries		Semifinals		Final	
Athlete	Event	Points	Rank	Points	Rank	Points	Rank
Anisley García	3 m springboard	245.40	20	Did not advance			
Anisley García	10 m platform	259.90	19	Did not advance			
Prisis Ruiz	1 m springboard	227.80	18	—		Did not advance	
Prisis Ruiz	3 m springboard	262.35	13 Q	229.90	16	Did not advance	

== Swimming ==
Cuba entered 3 swimmers.

Men

Athlete	Event	Heat		Semifinal		Final	
Athlete	Event	Time	Rank	Time	Rank	Time	Rank
Rodolfo Falcón Jr.	800 metre freestyle	8:38.90	42	—		Did not advance	
Rodolfo Falcón Jr.	1500 metre freestyle	16:11.17	30	—		Did not advance	

Women

Athlete	Event	Heat		Semifinal		Final	
Athlete	Event	Time	Rank	Time	Rank	Time	Rank
Andrea Becali	100 metre backstroke	1:04.22	31	Did not advance			
Andrea Becali	200 metre backstroke	2:21.54	28	Did not advance			
Elisbet Gámez	100 metre freestyle	56.20	24	Did not advance			
Elisbet Gámez	200 metre freestyle	2:00.83	27	Did not advance			
Elisbet Gámez	400 metre freestyle	4:19.91	25	—		Did not advance	
