= Artistic swimming at the 2024 World Aquatics Championships – Men's solo technical routine =

Men's solo technical routine at the 2024 World Aquatics Championships
- Venue: Aspire Dome
- Location: Doha, Qatar
- Dates: 2 February (preliminary); 5 February (final)
- Competitors: 14 from 14 nations
- Winning points: 246.4766

Medalists
gold medal	Yang Shuncheng	China
silver medal	Giorgio Minisini	Italy
bronze medal	Gustavo Sánchez	Colombia

The Men's solo technical routine competition at the 2024 World Aquatics Championships was held on 2 and 5 February 2024.

== Results ==
The preliminary round was started on 2 February at 12:15. The final was started on 5 February at 20:00.

Green denotes finalists

Rank	Swimmer	Nationality	Preliminary		Final	
Rank	Swimmer	Nationality	Points	Rank	Points	Rank
1st place, gold medalist(s)	Yang Shuncheng	China	242.4367	1	246.4766	1
2nd place, silver medalist(s)	Giorgio Minisini	Italy	218.0966	4	245.3166	2
3rd place, bronze medalist(s)	Gustavo Sánchez	Colombia	228.9966	2	231.0000	3
4	Dennis González	Spain	228.7550	3	227.6000	4
5	Diego Villalobos	Mexico	210.7850	6	221.5433	5
6	Eduard Kim	Kazakhstan	214.4384	5	215.9483	6
7	Kenneth Gaudet	United States	180.8534	10	215.4533	7
8	Nicolás Campos	Chile	204.1083	7	203.8483	8
9	Kantinan Adisaisiributr	Thailand	177.3216	11	188.7716	9
10	David Martinez	Sweden	181.1451	9	187.2700	10
11	Bernardo Santos	Brazil	182.6351	8	177.2900	11
12	Renaud Barral	Belgium	167.4516	12	166.4566	12
13	Andy Ávila	Cuba	141.9067	13	Did not advance	
14	Dimitar Isaev	Bulgaria	121.4600	14	Did not advance	
