= Cuba at the 2019 World Aquatics Championships =

- Flag of Cuba
- FINA code: CUB
- National federation: Federación Cubaña de Natación

in Gwangju, South Korea
- Competitors: 26 in 4 sports
- Medals: Gold 0 Silver 0 Bronze 0 Total 0

World Aquatics Championships appearances
- 1973; 1975; 1978; 1982; 1986; 1991; 1994; 1998; 2001; 2003; 2005; 2007; 2009; 2011; 2013; 2015; 2017; 2019; 2022; 2023; 2024

Cuba competed at the 2019 World Aquatics Championships in Gwangju, South Korea from 12 to 28 July.

== Artistic swimming ==
Cuba's artistic swimming team consisted of 4 athletes (4 female).

Women

Athlete	Event	Preliminaries		Final	
Athlete	Event	Points	Rank	Points	Rank
Gabriela Alpajon; Carelys Valdes (R)	Solo technical routine	70.3457	23	did not advance	
Gabriela Alpajon; Carelys Valdes (R)	Solo free routine	70.5667	29	did not advance	
Gabriela Alpajon; Carelys Valdes; Stephany Urbina (R)	Duet technical routine	66.7881	40	did not advance	
Stephany Urbina; Cire Zuferri; Gabriela Alpajon (R)	Duet free routine	66.9667	41	did not advance	

Legend: (R) = Reserve Athlete

== Diving ==
Cuba entered six divers.

Men

Athlete	Event	Preliminaries		Semifinals		Final	
Athlete	Event	Points	Rank	Points	Rank	Points	Rank
Angello Alcebo	1 m springboard	241.65	40	—		did not advance	
Angello Alcebo	3 m springboard	327.80	43	did not advance			
Laydel Domínguez	3 m springboard	352.00	34	did not advance			
Carlos Ramos	10 m platform	312.60	36	did not advance			
Yoan Merino	10 m platform	326.85	31	did not advance			
Angello Alcebo; Laydel Domínguez	3 m synchronized springboard	267.72	24	—		did not advance	

Women

Athlete	Event	Preliminaries		Semifinals		Final	
Athlete	Event	Points	Rank	Points	Rank	Points	Rank
Anisley García	1 m springboard	213.25	22	—		did not advance	
Anisley García	10 m platform	269.60	21	did not advance			
Anisley García; Prisis Ruiz	3 m synchronized springboard	219.30	20	—		did not advance	

Mixed

Athlete	Event	Final	
Athlete	Event	Points	Rank
Carlos Ramos; Anisley García	Team	306.60	12

== Swimming ==
Cuba entered three swimmers.

Men

Athlete	Event	Heat		Semifinal		Final	
Athlete	Event	Time	Rank	Time	Rank	Time	Rank
Armando Barrera	50 m backstroke	26.53	49	did not advance			
Armando Barrera	100 m backstroke	57.00	47	did not advance			
Armando Barrera	200 m backstroke	2:05.23	37	did not advance			
Luis Emigdio Vega	200 m butterfly	1:59.94	29	did not advance			

Women

Athlete	Event	Heat		Semifinal		Final	
Athlete	Event	Time	Rank	Time	Rank	Time	Rank
Elisbet Gámez	200 m freestyle	2:00.33	20	did not advance			
Elisbet Gámez	400 m freestyle	4:18.19	29	—		did not advance	

== Water polo ==
=== Women's tournament ===
Team roster

- Mairelis Zunzunegui Morgan (C)
- Dalia Grau Quintero
- Madonni Chavez Pena
- Thaimi Gonzalez Tamayo
- Daniuska Carrasco Leyva
- Mayelin Bernal Villa
- Jennifer Plasencia Suarez
- Arisel Gonzalez Sanchez
- Cecilia Diaz Mesa
- Dianela Fria Tellez
- Lisbeth Santana Sosa
- Aliannis Ramirez White
- Arisney Ramos Betancourt

Group C

Pos	Team	Pld	W	D	L	GF	GA	GD	Pts	Qualification
1	Spain	3	3	0	0	51	16	+35	6	Quarterfinals
2	Greece	3	2	0	1	37	25	+12	4	Playoffs
3	Kazakhstan	3	1	0	2	22	37	−15	2	Playoffs
4	Cuba	3	0	0	3	16	48	−32	0	

Updated to match(es) played on 18 July 2019. Source: Sportresult
Rules for classification: 1) points; 2) head-to-head points; 3) head-to-head goal difference; 4) head-to-head number of goals scored; 5) Goal difference.

14 July 2019; 16:30	Report	Cuba	6–9	Kazakhstan	Nambu University Aquatics Center, Gwangju; Referees: Adrian Alexandrescu (ROU), Dion Willis (RSA)
14 July 2019; 16:30	Report	Score by quarters: 0–1, 3–1, 2–4, 1–3			Nambu University Aquatics Center, Gwangju; Referees: Adrian Alexandrescu (ROU), Dion Willis (RSA)
14 July 2019; 16:30	Report	Chávez 2	Goals	Myrzabekova 3	Nambu University Aquatics Center, Gwangju; Referees: Adrian Alexandrescu (ROU), Dion Willis (RSA)

16 July 2019; 12:30	Report	Cuba	4–20	Greece	Nambu University Aquatics Center, Gwangju; Referees: Adrian Alexandrescu (ROU), Ni Shi Wei (CHN)
16 July 2019; 12:30	Report	Score by quarters: 0–5, 3–6, 0–5, 1–4			Nambu University Aquatics Center, Gwangju; Referees: Adrian Alexandrescu (ROU), Ni Shi Wei (CHN)
16 July 2019; 12:30	Report	Carrasco 2	Goals	Avramidou 6	Nambu University Aquatics Center, Gwangju; Referees: Adrian Alexandrescu (ROU), Ni Shi Wei (CHN)

18 July 2019; 08:30	Report	Cuba	6–19	Spain	Nambu University Aquatics Center, Gwangju; Referees: Germán Moller (ARG), Jeremy Cheng (SGP)
18 July 2019; 08:30	Report	Score by quarters: 0–7, 1–6, 4–3, 1–3			Nambu University Aquatics Center, Gwangju; Referees: Germán Moller (ARG), Jeremy Cheng (SGP)
18 July 2019; 08:30	Report	Bernal 3	Goals	two players 4	Nambu University Aquatics Center, Gwangju; Referees: Germán Moller (ARG), Jeremy Cheng (SGP)

13th–16th place semifinals

20 July 2019; 12:00	Report	Cuba	9–21	Japan	Nambu University Aquatics Center, Gwangju; Referees: Gabriella Varkonyi (HUN), John Waldow (NZL)
20 July 2019; 12:00	Report	Score by quarters: 3–6, 2–6, 2–4, 2–5			Nambu University Aquatics Center, Gwangju; Referees: Gabriella Varkonyi (HUN), John Waldow (NZL)
20 July 2019; 12:00	Report	Bernal 3	Goals	Arima 5	Nambu University Aquatics Center, Gwangju; Referees: Gabriella Varkonyi (HUN), John Waldow (NZL)

15th place match

22 July 2019; 08:00	Report	South Korea	–	Cuba	Nambu University Aquatics Center, Gwangju

13th–16th place semifinals

20 July 2019; 12:00	Report	Cuba	9–21	Japan	Nambu University Aquatics Center, Gwangju; Referees: Gabriella Várkonyi (HUN), John Waldow (NZL)
20 July 2019; 12:00	Report	Score by quarters: 3–6, 2–6, 2–4, 2–5			Nambu University Aquatics Center, Gwangju; Referees: Gabriella Várkonyi (HUN), John Waldow (NZL)
20 July 2019; 12:00	Report	Bernal 3	Goals	Arima 5	Nambu University Aquatics Center, Gwangju; Referees: Gabriella Várkonyi (HUN), John Waldow (NZL)

15th place game

22 July 2019; 08:00	Report	South Korea	0–30	Cuba	Nambu University Aquatics Center, Gwangju; Referees: Natacha Florestano (BRA), Viktor Salnichenko (KAZ)
22 July 2019; 08:00	Report	Score by quarters: 0–8, 0–9, 0–6, 0–7			Nambu University Aquatics Center, Gwangju; Referees: Natacha Florestano (BRA), Viktor Salnichenko (KAZ)
22 July 2019; 08:00	Report		Goals	four players 5	Nambu University Aquatics Center, Gwangju; Referees: Natacha Florestano (BRA), Viktor Salnichenko (KAZ)
