= Artistic swimming at the 2024 World Aquatics Championships – Mixed duet free routine =

Mixed duet free routine at the 2024 World Aquatics Championships
- Venue: Aspire Dome
- Location: Doha, Qatar
- Dates: 9 February (preliminary); 10 February (final)
- Competitors: 20 from 10 nations
- Teams: 10
- Winning points: 224.1437

Medalists
gold medal	Cheng Wentao; Shi Haoyu	China
silver medal	Dennis González; Mireia Hernández	Spain
bronze medal	Trinidad Meza; Diego Villalobos	Mexico

The Mixed duet free routine competition at the 2024 World Aquatics Championships was held on 9 and 10 February 2024.

== Results ==
The preliminary round was started on 9 February at 09:30. The final was held on 10 February at 09:30.

Rank	Swimmers	Nationality	Preliminary		Final	
Rank	Swimmers	Nationality	Points	Rank	Points	Rank
1st place, gold medalist(s)	Cheng Wentao; Shi Haoyu	China	215.2042	1	224.1437	1
2nd place, silver medalist(s)	Dennis González; Mireia Hernández	Spain	202.6041	2	208.3583	2
3rd place, bronze medalist(s)	Trinidad Meza; Diego Villalobos	Mexico	183.4813	3	192.5772	3
4	Jennifer Cerquera; Gustavo Sánchez	Colombia	181.7958	4	191.8729	4
5	Nargiza Bolatova; Eduard Kim	Kazakhstan	140.8416	7	170.6875	5
6	Jelena Kontić; Ivan Martinović	Serbia	156.4125	5	161.5540	6
7	Kantinan Adisaisiributr; Voranan Toomchay	Thailand	135.4730	8	144.5978	7
8	Bernardo Santos; Anna Giulia Veloso	Brazil	141.3770	6	118.0980	8
9	Andy Ávila; Carelys Valdés	Cuba	75.6249	10	96.8334	9
10	Hristina Cherkezova; Dimitar Isaev	Bulgaria	108.2458	9	93.7938	10
