= Diving at the 2023 World Aquatics Championships – Men's 10 metre platform =

Men's 10 metre platform at the 2023 World Aquatics Championships
- Venue: Fukuoka Prefectural Pool
- Location: Fukuoka, Japan
- Dates: 21 July (preliminary and semifinal); 22 July (final)
- Competitors: 40 from 24 nations
- Winning points: 520.85

Medalists
gold medal	Cassiel Rousseau	Australia
silver medal	Lian Junjie	China
bronze medal	Yang Hao	China

The men's 10 metre platform competition at the 2023 World Aquatics Championships was held on 21 and 22 July 2023.

== Results ==
The preliminary round was started on 21 July at 09:00. The semifinal was held on 21 July at 15:30. The final was started on 22 July at 18:30.

Green denotes finalists

Blue denotes semifinalists

Rank	Diver	Nationality	Preliminary		Semifinal		Final	
Rank	Diver	Nationality	Points	Rank	Points	Rank	Points	Rank
1st place, gold medalist(s)	Cassiel Rousseau	Australia	423.80	5	494.10	2	520.85	1
2nd place, silver medalist(s)	Lian Junjie	China	466.90	1	505.50	1	512.35	2
3rd place, bronze medalist(s)	Yang Hao	China	465.95	2	484.90	3	504.00	3
4	Noah Williams	Great Britain	435.15	4	450.65	6	499.10	4
5	Kyle Kothari	Great Britain	423.70	6	475.60	5	497.35	5
6	Oleksiy Sereda	Ukraine	409.10	10	418.15	12	475.55	6
7	Nathan Zsombor-Murray	Canada	391.55	13	422.55	9	468.00	7
8	Randal Willars	Mexico	411.55	9	477.55	4	465.55	8
9	Isaac Souza	Brazil	420.15	7	418.95	11	447.50	9
10	Bertrand Rhodict Lises	Malaysia	449.65	3	420.70	10	442.35	10
11	Kim Yeong-taek	South Korea	402.40	11	425.90	8	405.85	11
12	Rikuto Tamai	Japan	404.50	12	427.70	7	Withdrawn	
13	Carlos Camacho	Spain	389.75	14	399.10	13	Did not advance	
14	Yi Jae-gyeong	South Korea	377.40	17	396.55	14	Did not advance	
15	Yevhen Naumenko	Ukraine	411.75	8	394.35	15	Did not advance	
16	Maxwell Flory	United States	384.95	16	382.95	16	Did not advance	
17	Anton Knoll	Austria	389.10	15	375.50	17	Did not advance	
18	Constantin Popovici	Romania	376.80	18	334.80	18	Did not advance	
19	Samuel Fricker	Australia	370.35	19	Did not advance			
20	Emanuel Vázquez	Puerto Rico	368.50	20	Did not advance			
21	Diego Balleza	Mexico	361.65	21	Did not advance			
22	Robert Łukaszewicz	Poland	358.60	22	Did not advance			
23	Brandon Loschiavo	United States	356.55	23	Did not advance			
24	Nathan Brown	New Zealand	351.15	24	Did not advance			
25	Nikolaos Molvalis	Greece	346.70	25	Did not advance			
26	Carlos Ramos	Cuba	344.95	26	Did not advance			
27	Diogo Silva	Brazil	344.25	27	Did not advance			
28	Max Lee	Singapore	337.20	28	Did not advance			
29	Shu Ohkubo	Japan	336.65	29	Did not advance			
30	Isak Børslien	Norway	334.30	30	Did not advance			
31	Riccardo Giovannini	Italy	325.25	31	Did not advance			
32	Athanasios Tsirikos	Greece	323.20	32	Did not advance			
33	Dariush Lotfi	Austria	323.10	33	Did not advance			
34	Andreas Sargent Larsen	Italy	322.30	34	Did not advance			
35	Luis Avila Sanchez	Germany	319.55	35	Did not advance			
36	Filip Jachim	Poland	315.90	36	Did not advance			
37	Luke Sipkes	New Zealand	315.35	37	Did not advance			
38	Jaden Eikermann	Germany	310.70	38	Did not advance			
39	Enrique Harold	Malaysia	308.20	39	Did not advance			
40	Marat Grigoryan	Armenia	208.00	40	Did not advance			
	Jesús González	Venezuela	Did not start					
