= Colombia at the 2023 World Aquatics Championships =

- Flag of Colombia
- World Aquatics code: COL
- National federation: Federación Colombiana de Natación
- Website: fecna.com.co

in Fukuoka, Japan
- Competitors: 15 in 4 sports
- Medals Ranked 21st: Gold 0 Silver 1 Bronze 0 Total 1

World Aquatics Championships appearances
- 1973; 1975; 1978; 1982; 1986; 1991; 1994; 1998; 2001; 2003; 2005; 2007; 2009; 2011; 2013; 2015; 2017; 2019; 2022; 2023; 2024; 2025

Colombia is scheduled to compete at the 2023 World Aquatics Championships in Fukuoka, Japan from 14 to 30 July 2023.

== Medalists ==
Medal	Name	Sport	Event	Date
Silver	Gustavo Sánchez	Artistic swimming	Men's solo free routine	July 19

== Artistic swimming ==
Men

Athlete	Event	Preliminaries		Final	
Athlete	Event	Points	Rank	Points	Rank
Gustavo Sánchez	Solo technical routine	202.2200	3 Q	204.8617	4
Gustavo Sánchez	Solo free routine	166.3022	6 Q	189.9625	2nd place, silver medalist(s)

Women

Athlete	Event	Preliminaries		Final	
Athlete	Event	Points	Rank	Points	Rank
Melisa Ceballos; Estefanía Roa	Duet technical routine	196.2966	16	Did not advance	
Melisa Ceballos; Estefanía Roa	Duet free routine	145.4605	19	Did not advance	

Mixed

Athlete	Event	Preliminaries		Final	
Athlete	Event	Points	Rank	Points	Rank
Jennifer Cerquera; Gustavo Sánchez	Duet technical routine	168.5900	12 Q	210.1833	6
Jennifer Cerquera; Gustavo Sánchez	Duet free routine	172.3666	4 Q	170.2208	4

== Diving ==
Colombia entered 3 divers.

Men

Athlete	Event	Preliminaries		Semifinals		Final	
Athlete	Event	Points	Rank	Points	Rank	Points	Rank
Daniel Restrepo	1 m springboard	318.35	23	—N/a		Did not advance	
Daniel Restrepo	3 m springboard	385.65	16 Q	410.90	11 Q	328.80	10
Luis Uribe	1 m springboard	327.10	20	—N/a		Did not advance	
Luis Uribe	3 m springboard	360.85	29	Did not advance			
Daniel Restrepo; Luis Uribe	3 m synchronized springboard	334.32	17	—N/a		Did not advance	

Women

Athlete	Event	Preliminaries		Semifinals		Final	
Athlete	Event	Points	Rank	Points	Rank	Points	Rank
Daniela Zapata	1 m springboard	210.70	34	—N/a		Did not advance	
Daniela Zapata	3 m springboard	262.40	26	Did not advance			

== High diving ==
Colombia entered 3 high divers.

Men

Athlete	Event	Points	Rank
Miguel García	Men's high diving	374.40	8
Víctor Ortega	Men's high diving	220.95	22

Women

Athlete	Event	Points	Rank
María Quintero	Women's high diving	288.60	7

== Open water swimming ==
Colombia entered 1 open water swimmer.

Men

Athlete	Event	Time	Rank
Juan Morales	Men's 10 km	DNS	

== Swimming ==
Colombia entered 6 swimmers.

Men

Athlete	Event	Heat		Semifinal		Final	
Athlete	Event	Time	Rank	Time	Rank	Time	Rank
Santiago Corredor	200 metre freestyle	1:50.68	38	Did not advance			
Santiago Corredor	200 metre individual medley	2:06.37	38	Did not advance			
Jorge Murillo	50 metre breaststroke	27.71	24	Did not advance			
Jorge Murillo	100 metre breaststroke	1:01.23	29	Did not advance			

Women

Athlete	Event	Heat		Semifinal		Final	
Athlete	Event	Time	Rank	Time	Rank	Time	Rank
Karen Durango	200 metre freestyle	2:00.71	30	Did not advance			
Karen Durango	200 metre butterfly	2:12.86	23	Did not advance			
Stefanía Gómez	100 metre breaststroke	1:09.11	32	Did not advance			
Stefanía Gómez	200 metre individual medley	2:17.21	27	Did not advance			
Sirena Rowe	50 metre freestyle	25.79	38	Did not advance			
Sirena Rowe	50 metre butterfly	27.19	33	Did not advance			

Mixed

Athlete	Event	Heat		Final	
Athlete	Event	Time	Rank	Time	Rank
Santiago Corredor; Jorge Murillo; Karen Durango; Sirena Rowe	4 × 100 m medley relay	3:57.47	22	Did not advance	
