= Artistic swimming at the 2022 Asian Games – Team =

Team at the 2022 Asian Games
- Venue: Hangzhou Olympic Expo Aquatics Center
- Date: 6–8 October 2023
- Competitors: 89 from 10 nations

Medalists
gold medal	China; Chang Hao, Cheng Wentao, Feng Yu, Shi Haoyu, Wang Ciyue, Wang Liuyi; Wang Qianyi, Xiang Binxuan, Xiao Yanning, Zhang Yayi
silver medal	Japan; Moka Fujii, Moe Higa, Moeka Kijima, Tomoka Sato, Ayano Shimada, Ami Wada, Akane Yanagisawa, Mashiro Yasunaga, Megumu Yoshida
bronze medal	Kazakhstan; Nargiza Bolatova, Eteri Kakutia, Aigerim Kurmangaliyeva, Xeniya Makarova, Arina Myasnikova, Anna Pavletsova, Arina Pushkina, Yasmin Tuyakova, Zhaklin Yakimova, Zhaniya Zhiyengazy

The team event at the 2022 Asian Games took place from 6 to 8 October 2023 at HOC Aquatics Center.

On 7 October 2022, World Aquatics (then FINA) voted to amend its rules to allow up to two male athletes to participate in the team event. However, only two male swimmers from China and Thailand participated in the games.

== Schedule ==
All times are China Standard Time (UTC+08:00)

Date	Time	Event
Friday, 6 October 2023	19:30	Acrobatic routine
Saturday, 7 October 2023	19:30	Technical routine
Sunday, 8 October 2023	10:00	Free routine

== Results ==
Legend

- AR — Reserve in acrobatic
- FR — Reserve in free
- RR — Reserve in acrobatic, technical and free
- TR — Reserve in technical

Rank	Team	Acrobatic	Technical	Free	Total
1st place, gold medalist(s)	China (CHN); Chang Hao; Cheng Wentao (TR/FR); Feng Yu; Shi Haoyu (TR/FR); Wang Ciyue; Wang Liuyi (AR); Wang Qianyi (AR); Xiang Binxuan; Xiao Yanning; Zhang Yayi	235.7534	291.7267	341.4875	868.9676
2nd place, silver medalist(s)	Japan (JPN); Moka Fujii (RR); Moe Higa; Moeka Kijima; Tomoka Sato; Ayano Shimada; Ami Wada; Akane Yanagisawa; Mashiro Yasunaga; Megumu Yoshida	222.3466	279.6672	329.2397	831.2535
3rd place, bronze medalist(s)	Kazakhstan (KAZ); Nargiza Bolatova; Eteri Kakutia; Aigerim Kurmangaliyeva; Xeniya Makarova; Arina Myasnikova; Anna Pavletsova; Arina Pushkina (RR); Yasmin Tuyakova (RR); Zhaklin Yakimova; Zhaniya Zhiyengazy	205.6333	223.5541	234.5543	663.7417
4	North Korea (PRK); Han Ryu-jong; Jong Mi-yon; Kang U-na (RR); Kim Hyon-jong (RR); Kim Il-sim; Min Hae-yon; Pak Hyon-a; Pak Rye-yon; So Jong-hui; Yun Kyong-ryong	178.3133	235.8380	191.8896	606.0409
5	Singapore (SGP); Yvette Chong; Kiera Lee; Rae-Anne Ong; Eleanor Quah (TR); Debbie Soh (AR/FR); Posh Soh; Royce Soh; Vivien Tai; Claire Tan; Miya Yong (RR)	159.9467	202.0863	213.5834	575.6164
6	Hong Kong (HKG); Eva Chong (AR); Katherine Chu; Nandini Dulani (AR); Hung Sze Ching; Lauren Lam (FR); Haynee Lau; Lee Chi Yin; Mok Ka Yan (TR); Wong Wing Ka; Wu Kiu Lok (TR/FR)	148.5166	176.3172	163.6627	488.4965
7	Macau (MAC); Ao Weng I Au Ieong Sin Ieng; Chan Ka Hei; Chau Cheng Han; Chio Un Tong; Chio Weng Tong (RR); Constanca Gabriel Zhou; Lo Wai Lam; Shao Anlan (TR/FR); Zheng Zexuan (AR)	151.4901	179.4118	156.5834	487.4853
8	Thailand (THA); Jinnipha Adisaisiributr; Kantinan Adisaisiributr; Patrawee Chayawararak; Nannapat Duangprasert; Chantaras Jarupraditlert; Pongpimporn Pongsuwan; Chalisa Sinsawat (RR); Supitchaya Songpan; Nichapa Takiennut (RR); Voranan Toomchay	150.9001	165.2154	160.5272	476.6427
