= Megumu Yoshida (synchronized swimmer) =

Japanese synchronized swimmer

Personal information
- Nationality: Japanese
- Born: 2 July 1995 (age 31) Nagoya, Japan

Sport
- Sport: Swimming
- Strokes: Synchronised swimming
Medal record
Synchronised swimming
World Championships
Silver medal – second place	2022 Budapest	Free routine combination
Silver medal – second place	2022 Budapest	Team technical routine
Silver medal – second place	2024 Doha	Team free routine
Bronze medal – third place	2022 Budapest	Team free routine
Bronze medal – third place	2023 Fukuoka	Team acrobatic routine
Bronze medal – third place	2024 Doha	Team technical routine
Asian Games
Silver medal – second place	2018 Jakarta-Palembang	Duet routine
Silver medal – second place	2018 Jakarta-Palembang	Team routine
Silver medal – second place	2022 Hangzhou	Team routine

Megumu Yoshida (吉田 萌, Yoshida Megumu, born 2 July 1995) is a Japanese competitor in synchronised swimming. She competed at the 2020 Summer Olympics, in the duet event with Yukiko Inui, and in the team event.

== Career ==
She participated for the 2019 World Aquatics Championships, 2018 Asian Games, and 2021 FINA Artistic Swimming World Series.

She studies at Aichi Gakuin University.
