= Moeka Kijima =

Japanese synchronized swimmer

Personal information
- Nationality: Japanese
- Born: 2 September 1999 (age 27) Hakusan, Japan

Sport
- Sport: Swimming
- Strokes: Synchronised swimming
Medal record
Women's synchronised swimming
Representing Japan
World Championships
| Silver medal – second place | 2022 Budapest | Free routine combination |
| Silver medal – second place | 2022 Budapest | Team technical routine |
| Silver medal – second place | 2023 Fukuoka | Team free routine |
| Silver medal – second place | 2024 Doha | Team free routine |
| Bronze medal – third place | 2022 Budapest | Team free routine |
| Bronze medal – third place | 2024 Doha | Team technical routine |
Asian Games
| Silver medal – second place | 2018 Jakarta-Palembang | Team routine |
| Silver medal – second place | 2022 Hangzhou | Team routine |

Moeka Kijima (木島 萌香, Kijima Moeka; born 2 September 1999) is a Japanese competitor in synchronised swimming.

== Career ==
Kijima participated for the 2018 Asian Games, where she won a silver medal in the team event as well as the 2019 World Aquatics Championships. She competed for the 2020 Summer Olympics, where she was part of Japan's team that finished fourth in the team event.

In June 2022 at the World Aquatics Championships in Budapest, Kijima was part of the Japanese team that won silver in both the free routine combination and technical routine as well as bronze in the free routine. In July 2023 at the World Championships in Fukuoka, she was part of the Japanese team that won silver in the team free routine and bronze in the team acrobatic routine. In October 2023 at the delayed 2022 Asian Games in Hangzhou, Kijima was part of Japan's team that won silver in the team competition.

In February 2024 at the World Championships in Doha, she was part of the Japanese team that won silver in the acrobatic, free routine and bronze in the technical routine.
