= Artistic swimming at the 2022 Asian Games – Women's duet =

Women's duet at the 2022 Asian Games
- Venue: Hangzhou Olympic Expo Aquatics Center
- Date: 6–7 October 2023
- Competitors: 25 from 10 nations

Medalists
gold medal	China; Wang Liuyi, Wang Qianyi
silver medal	Japan; Moe Higa, Tomoka Sato, Mashiro Yasunaga
bronze medal	Kazakhstan; Arina Pushkina, Yasmin Tuyakova

The women's duet event at the 2022 Asian Games took place from 6 to 7 October 2023 at HOC Aquatics Center.

== Schedule ==
All times are China Standard Time (UTC+08:00)

Date	Time	Event
Friday, 6 October 2023	14:00	Technical routine
Saturday, 7 October 2023	14:00	Free routine

== Results ==
Legend

- RR — Reserve in technical and free

Rank	Team	Technical	Free	Total
1st place, gold medalist(s)	China (CHN); Wang Liuyi; Wang Qianyi	266.5767	260.2853	526.8620
2nd place, silver medalist(s)	Japan (JPN); Moe Higa; Tomoka Sato (RR); Mashiro Yasunaga	253.7433	235.6855	489.4288
3rd place, bronze medalist(s)	Kazakhstan (KAZ); Arina Pushkina; Yasmin Tuyakova	218.1633	200.5354	418.6987
4	South Korea (KOR); Hur Yoon-seo; Lee Ri-young	201.9967	200.0334	402.0301
5	Singapore (SGP); Debbie Soh; Miya Yong	206.6833	175.2875	381.9708
6	Uzbekistan (UZB); Diana Onkes; Ziyodakhon Toshkhujaeva; Anna Vashchenko (RR)	190.6966	179.8417	370.5383
7	North Korea (PRK); Jong Mi-yon; Kim Il-sim (RR); Min Hae-yon	202.9900	163.2897	366.2797
8	Thailand (THA); Pongpimporn Pongsuwan; Supitchaya Songpan	176.6717	136.5459	313.2176
9	Hong Kong (HKG); Eva Chong; Katherine Chu (RR); Nandini Dulani	176.8884	133.4397	310.3281
10	Macau (MAC); Ao Weng I Chau Cheng Han; Chio Un Tong (RR)	167.4751	139.1917	306.6668
