= Wang Qianyi =

Chinese synchronized swimmer

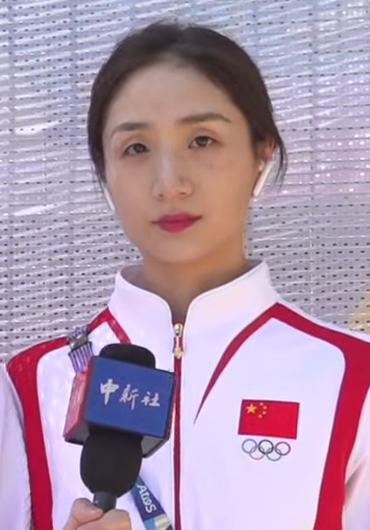
- Wang in 2024

Personal information
- National team: China
- Born: 16 January 1997 (age 29) Shenzhen, Guangdong, China

Sport
- Sport: Swimming
- Strokes: Synchronised swimming
Medal record
Women's synchronised swimming
Representing China
Olympic Games
Gold medal – first place	2024 Paris	Team
Gold medal – first place	2024 Paris	Duet
Silver medal – second place	2020 Tokyo	Team
World Championships
Gold medal – first place	2017 Budapest	Free routine combination
Gold medal – first place	2022 Budapest	Duet technical routine
Gold medal – first place	2022 Budapest	Duet free routine
Gold medal – first place	2022 Budapest	Team technical routine
Gold medal – first place	2022 Budapest	Team free routine
Gold medal – first place	2023 Fukuoka	Team free routine
Gold medal – first place	2024 Doha	Duet technical routine
Gold medal – first place	2024 Doha	Duet free routine
Gold medal – first place	2024 Doha	Team acrobatic routine
Gold medal – first place	2024 Doha	Team technical routine
Silver medal – second place	2017 Budapest	Team technical routine
Silver medal – second place	2019 Gwangju	Team technical routine
Silver medal – second place	2019 Gwangju	Free routine combination
Silver medal – second place	2023 Fukuoka	Duet free routine
Asian Games
Gold medal – first place	2018 Jakarta-Palembang	Team routine
Gold medal – first place	2022 Hangzhou	Duet routine
Gold medal – first place	2022 Hangzhou	Team routine

Wang Qianyi (Chinese: 王芊懿, born 16 January 1997) is a Chinese synchronised swimmer. She won a gold medal (China's first ever) and a silver medal at the 2017 World Aquatics Championships. At the 2024 Summer Olympics, she won gold medals in both the artistic swimming women's team and duet events.

She is the younger twin sister of Wang Liuyi who is also her teammate and duet partner.
