= Byun Jae-jun =

South Korean synchronized swimmer

Byun jae-jun
Personal information
- Born: 28 June 2003 (age 23)

Sport
- Sport: Swimming
- Strokes: Synchronized swimming

Byun Jae-jun (born 2003) is a South Korean artistic swimmer. He is the first Korean male Artistic swimmer. He finished 10th in both the mixed duet technical and mixed duet free events at the 2023 World Aquatics Championships.

Byun's mother, Lee Ju-young, competed in artistic swimming, as well. His father is South Korean singer Byun Jin-sub.
