= Wang Liuyi =

Chinese synchronized swimmer

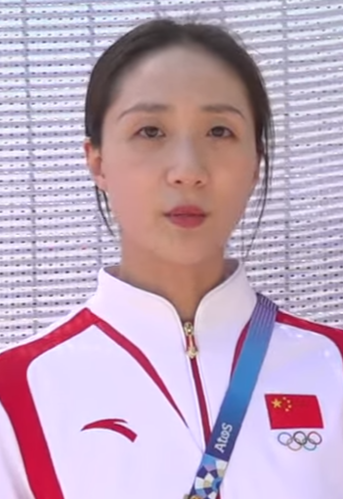
- Wang in 2024

Personal information
- Born: 16 January 1997 (age 29) Shenzhen, Guangdong, China

Sport
- Sport: Swimming
- Strokes: Synchronized swimming
Medal record
Women's synchronized swimming
Representing China
Olympic Games
Gold medal – first place	2024 Paris	Team
Gold medal – first place	2024 Paris	Duet
World Championships
Gold medal – first place	2017 Budapest	Free combination
Gold medal – first place	2022 Budapest	Duet technical routine
Gold medal – first place	2022 Budapest	Duet free routine
Gold medal – first place	2022 Budapest	Team technical routine
Gold medal – first place	2022 Budapest	Team free routine
Gold medal – first place	2023 Fukuoka	Team free routine
Gold medal – first place	2024 Doha	Duet technical routine
Gold medal – first place	2024 Doha	Duet free routine
Gold medal – first place	2024 Doha	Team acrobatic routine
Gold medal – first place	2024 Doha	Team technical routine
Silver medal – second place	2017 Budapest	Team technical
Silver medal – second place	2023 Fukuoka	Duet free routine
Asian Games
Gold medal – first place	2018 Jakarta-Palembang	Team routine
Gold medal – first place	2022 Hangzhou	Duet routine
Gold medal – first place	2022 Hangzhou	Team routine

Wang Liuyi (Chinese: 王柳懿, born 16 January 1997) is a Chinese synchronised swimmer. She won a gold medal (China's first ever) and a silver medal at the 2017 World Aquatics Championships. She also won a team gold medal at the 2018 Asian Games and a duet-free gold medal at the 2018 World Series. At the 2024 Summer Olympics, she won gold in both the artistic swimming women's team and duet events.

She is the elder twin sister of Wang Qianyi, who is also her teammate and duet partner.
