= Cheng Wentao =

Chinese synchronized swimmer (born 1998)

Personal information
- Nationality: Chinese
- Born: 18 May 1998 (age 28)

Sport
- Country: China
- Sport: Synchronised swimming
Medal record
Women's synchronised swimming
Representing China
World Championships
Gold medal – first place	2023 Fukuoka	Team acrobatic routine
Gold medal – first place	2023 Fukuoka	Mixed duet free routine
Gold medal – first place	2024 Doha	Team free routine
Gold medal – first place	2024 Doha	Mixed duet free routine
Gold medal – first place	2025 Singapore	Team free routine
Gold medal – first place	2025 Singapore	Team technical routine
Gold medal – first place	2025 Singapore	Team acrobatic routine
Silver medal – second place	2019 Gwangju	Free routine combination
Silver medal – second place	2024 Doha	Mixed duet technical routine
Bronze medal – third place	2023 Fukuoka	Mixed duet technical routine
Asian Games
Gold medal – first place	2022 Hangzhou	Team routine

Cheng Wentao (born 18 May 1998) is a Chinese synchronised swimmer.

She participated at the 2019 World Aquatics Championships, winning a medal.
