= Laura Strugnell =

South African synchronized swimmer

Personal information
- Nationality: South Africa
- Born: 14 April 1992 (age 33); South Africa

Sport
- Sport: Synchronized swimming
- Event: Women's duet

Laura Strugnell (born 14 April 1992) is a South African synchronized swimmer. She competed in the 2020 Summer Olympics in Tokyo, Japan. She also competed at the 2022 World Aquatics Championships in Budapest, Hungary.
