= Artistic swimming at the 2026 Asian Games =

- Venue: Hamamatsu Swimming Center
- Dates: 26 – 28 September 2026
- Competitors: 58 from 8 nations

Artistic swimming at the 2026 Asian Games was held between 26 and 28 September 2026 at Furuhashi Hironoshin Memorial Hamamatsu Swimming Centre.

On 7 October 2022, World Aquatics voted to amend its rules to allow up to two male athletes to participate in the team event.

== Schedule ==
The schedule is as follows:

A	Acrobatic routine	T	Technical routine	F	Free routine

Event↓/Date →	26th Sat	27th Sun	28th Mon
Women's duet	T	F	
Team	A	T	F

== Medal summary ==
=== Medal table ===
Rank	Nation	Gold	Silver	Bronze	Total
1	China	2	0	0	2
2	Japan*	0	2	0	2
3	Kazakhstan	0	0	2	2
Totals (3 entries)		2	2	2	6

=== Medalists ===
Event	Gold	Silver	Bronze
Duet	China; Lin Yanjun; Xu Huiyan	Japan; Moe Higa; Tomoka Sato	Kazakhstan; Nargiza Bolatova; Yasmin Tuyakova
Team	China; Chang Hao; Lin Yanhan; Lin Yanjun; Li Xiuchen; Zhang Xiaoyou; Xu Huiyan; Zhang Yayi; Xiang Binxuan; Dai Shiyi; Guo Muye	Japan; Nao Shirahase; Kaho Aitaka; Yuka Kawase; Uta Kobayashi; Ayano Shimada; Moka Fujii; Moe Higa; Tomoka Sato; Konatsu Ishi; Risako Mitsuhashi	Kazakhstan; Nargiza Bolatova; Viktor Druzin; Aigerim Kurmangaliyeva; Karina Magrupova; Xeniya Makarova; Anna Pavletsova; Valeriya Stolbunova; Yasmin Tuyakova; Dayana Jamanchalova; Zhaklin Yakimova

== Participating nations ==
- China (10)
- Hong Kong (10)
- Japan (10)
- Kazakhstan (10)
- Singapore (2)
- South Korea (3)
- Thailand (10)
- Uzbekistan (3)
