= China at the 2024 World Aquatics Championships =

- Flag of China
- FINA code: CHN
- National federation: Chinese Swimming Association
- Website: swimming.org.cn

in Doha, Qatar
- Competitors: 80 in 5 sports
- Medals Ranked 1st: Gold 23 Silver 8 Bronze 2 Total 33

World Aquatics Championships appearances
- 1973; 1975; 1978; 1982; 1986; 1991; 1994; 1998; 2001; 2003; 2005; 2007; 2009; 2011; 2013; 2015; 2017; 2019; 2022; 2023; 2024

China competed at the 2024 World Aquatics Championships in Doha, Qatar from 2 to 18 February.

== Medalists ==
Medal	Name	Sport	Event	Date
1st place, gold medalist(s)	Huang Jianjie; Zhang Jiaqi	Diving	Mixed synchronized 10 metre platform	3 February 2024
1st place, gold medalist(s)	Chang Hao; Feng Yu; Wang Ciyue; Wang Liuyi; Wang Qianyi; Xiang Binxuan; Xiao Yanning; Zhang Yayi	Artistic swimming	Team acrobatic routine	4 February 2024
1st place, gold medalist(s)	Long Daoyi; Wang Zongyuan	Diving	Men's synchronized 3 metre springboard	4 February 2024
1st place, gold medalist(s)	Yang Shuncheng	Artistic swimming	Men's solo technical routine	5 February 2024
1st place, gold medalist(s)	Quan Hongchan	Diving	Women's 10 metre platform	5 February 2024
1st place, gold medalist(s)	Wang Liuyi; Wang Qianyi	Artistic swimming	Women's duet technical routine	5 February 2024
1st place, gold medalist(s)	Chang Hao; Feng Yu; Wang Ciyue; Wang Liuyi; Wang Qianyi; Xiang Binxuan; Xiao Yanning; Zhang Yayi	Artistic swimming	Team technical routine	6 February 2024
1st place, gold medalist(s)	Chen Yuxi; Quan Hongchan	Diving	Women's synchronized 10 metre platform	6 February 2024
1st place, gold medalist(s)	Chang Yani; Chen Yiwen	Diving	Women's synchronized 3 metre springboard	7 February 2024
1st place, gold medalist(s)	Wang Zongyuan	Diving	Men's 3 metre springboard	7 February 2024
1st place, gold medalist(s)	Wang Liuyi; Wang Qianyi	Artistic swimming	Women's duet free routine	8 February 2024
1st place, gold medalist(s)	Lian Junjie; Yang Hao	Diving	Men's synchronized 10 metre platform	8 February 2024
1st place, gold medalist(s)	Chang Hao; Cheng Wentao; Feng Yu; Li Xiuchen; Wang Ciyue; Xiang Binxuan; Xiao Yanning; Zhang Yayi	Artistic swimming	Team free routine	9 February 2024
1st place, gold medalist(s)	Chang Yani	Diving	Women's 3 metre springboard	9 February 2024
1st place, gold medalist(s)	Cheng Wentao; Shi Haoyu	Artistic swimming	Mixed duet free routine	10 February 2024
1st place, gold medalist(s)	Yang Hao	Diving	Men's 10 metre platform	10 February 2024
1st place, gold medalist(s)	Pan Zhanle; Ji Xinjie; Zhang Zhanshuo; Wang Haoyu	Swimming	Men's 4 × 100 metre freestyle relay	11 February 2024
1st place, gold medalist(s)	Tang Qianting	Swimming	Women's 100 metre breaststroke	13 February 2024
1st place, gold medalist(s)	Pan Zhanle	Swimming	Men's 100 metre freestyle	15 February 2024
1st place, gold medalist(s)	Ai Yanhan; Gong Zhenqi; Li Bingjie; Yang Peiqi; Ma Yonghui	Swimming	Women's 4 × 200 metre freestyle relay	15 February 2024
1st place, gold medalist(s)	Dong Zhihao	Swimming	Men's 200 metre breaststroke	16 February 2024
1st place, gold medalist(s)	Ji Xinjie; Wang Haoyu; Pan Zhanle; Zhang Zhanshuo	Swimming	Men's 4 × 200 metre freestyle relay	16 February 2024
1st place, gold medalist(s)	Pan Zhanle; Wang Haoyu; Li Bingjie; Yu Yiting; Ji Xinjie; Ai Yanhan	Swimming	Mixed 4 × 100 metre freestyle relay	17 February 2024
2nd place, silver medalist(s)	Cheng Wentao; Shi Haoyu	Artistic swimming	Mixed duet technical routine	4 February 2024
2nd place, silver medalist(s)	Chen Yuxi	Diving	Women's 10 metre platform	5 February 2024
2nd place, silver medalist(s)	Xie Siyi	Diving	Men's 3 metre springboard	7 February 2024
2nd place, silver medalist(s)	Chen Yiwen	Diving	Women's 3 metre springboard	9 February 2024
2nd place, silver medalist(s)	Cao Yuan	Diving	Men's 10 metre platform	10 February 2024
2nd place, silver medalist(s)	Li Bingjie	Swimming	Women's 400 metre freestyle	11 February 2024
2nd place, silver medalist(s)	Li Bingjie	Swimming	Women's 1500 metre freestyle	13 February 2024
2nd place, silver medalist(s)	Tang Qianting	Swimming	Women's 50 metre breaststroke	18 February 2024
3rd place, bronze medalist(s)	Xu Huiyan	Artistic swimming	Women's solo technical routine	3 February 2024
3rd place, bronze medalist(s)	Yu Yiting	Swimming	Women's 200 metre individual medley	12 February 2024

== Competitors ==
The following is the list of competitors in the Championships.

Sport	Men	Women	Total
Artistic swimming	2	11	13
Diving	8	5	13
Open water swimming	2	2*	4*
Swimming	8	13*	21*
Water polo	15	15	30
Total	35	45*	80*

- Mao Yihan competed in both open water swimming and pool swimming.

== Artistic swimming ==
Men

Athlete	Event	Preliminaries		Final	
Athlete	Event	Points	Rank	Points	Rank
Yang Shuncheng	Solo technical routine	242.4367	1 Q	246.4766	1st place, gold medalist(s)
Yang Shuncheng	Solo free routine	213.9999	1 Q	176.3647	4

Women

Athlete	Event	Preliminaries		Final	
Athlete	Event	Points	Rank	Points	Rank
Xu Huiyan	Solo technical routine	258.2067	4 Q	262.3700	3rd place, bronze medalist(s)
Xu Huiyan	Solo free routine	230.8104	4 Q	244.2251	4
Wang Liuyi; Wang Qianyi	Duet technical routine	269.8883	1 Q	266.0484	1st place, gold medalist(s)
Wang Liuyi; Wang Qianyi	Duet free routine	250.8438	1 Q	250.7729	1st place, gold medalist(s)

Mixed

Athlete	Event	Preliminaries		Final	
Athlete	Event	Points	Rank	Points	Rank
Cheng Wentao; Shi Haoyu	Duet technical routine	250.5150	1 Q	223.3166	2nd place, silver medalist(s)
Cheng Wentao; Shi Haoyu	Duet free routine	215.2042	1 Q	224.1437	1st place, gold medalist(s)
Chang Hao; Feng Yu; Wang Ciyue; Wang Liuyi; Wang Qianyi; Xiang Binxuan; Xiao Yanning; Zhang Yayi	Team technical routine	304.1272	1 Q	299.8712	1st place, gold medalist(s)
Chang Hao; Feng Yu; Wang Ciyue; Wang Liuyi; Wang Qianyi; Xiang Binxuan; Xiao Yanning; Zhang Yayi	Team acrobatic routine	247.0233	1 Q	244.1767	1st place, gold medalist(s)
Chang Hao; Cheng Wentao; Feng Yu; Li Xiuchen; Wang Ciyue; Wang Binxuan; Xiang Binxuan; Xiao Yanning; Zhang Yayi	Team free routine	338.4981	1 Q	339.7604	1st place, gold medalist(s)

== Diving ==
Men

Athlete	Event	Preliminaries		Semifinals		Final	
Athlete	Event	Points	Rank	Points	Rank	Points	Rank
Cao Yuan	10 m platform	503.80	1 Q	492.75	1 Q	553.20	2nd place, silver medalist(s)
Wang Zongyuan	3 m springboard	474.30	2 Q	469.95	2 Q	538.70	1st place, gold medalist(s)
Xie Siyi	3 m springboard	493.05	1 Q	518.00	1 Q	516.10	2nd place, silver medalist(s)
Yang Hao	10 m platform	497.70	2 Q	468.15	3 Q	564.05	1st place, gold medalist(s)
Zheng Jiuyuan	1 m springboard	378.60	4	—		334.35	11
Long Daoyi; Wang Zongyuan	3 m synchro springboard	—				442.41	1st place, gold medalist(s)
Lian Junjie; Yang Hao	10 m synchro platform	—				470.76	1st place, gold medalist(s)

Women

Athlete	Event	Preliminaries		Semifinals		Final	
Athlete	Event	Points	Rank	Points	Rank	Points	Rank
Chang Yani	3 m springboard	290.90	4 Q	332.25	2 Q	354.75	1st place, gold medalist(s)
Chen Yuxi	10 m platform	435.20	1 Q	421.85	1 Q	427.80	2nd place, silver medalist(s)
Chen Yiwen	3 m springboard	297.75	2 Q	354.75	1 Q	336.60	2nd place, silver medalist(s)
Quan Hongchan	10 m platform	399.30	2 Q	405.30	2 Q	436.25	1st place, gold medalist(s)
Chang Yani; Chen Yiwen	3 m synchro springboard	—				323.43	1st place, gold medalist(s)
Chen Yuxi; Quan Hongchan	10 m synchro platform	—				362.22	1st place, gold medalist(s)

Mixed

Athlete	Event	Final	
Athlete	Event	Points	Rank
Huang Jianjie; Zhang Jiaqi	10 m synchro platform'	353.82	1st place, gold medalist(s)

== Open water swimming ==
Men

Athlete	Event	Time	Rank
Liu Peixin	Men's 5 km	55:16.8	43
Liu Peixin	Men's 10 km	1:59:41.7	63
Zhang Jinhou	Men's 5 km	55:11.5	40
Zhang Jinhou	Men's 10 km	1:54:06.0	51

Women

Athlete	Event	Time	Rank
Mao Yihan	Women's 5 km	58:57.5	19
Mao Yihan	Women's 10 km	2:06:07.6	40
Xin Xin	Women's 5 km	58:07.2	18
Xin Xin	Women's 10 km	2:04:21.1	37

Mixed

Athlete	Event	Time	Rank
Liu Peixin; Mao Yihan; Xin Xin; Zhang Jinhou	Team relay	1:07:17.2	11

== Swimming ==
China entered 21 swimmers.

Men

Athlete	Event	Heat		Semifinal		Final	
Athlete	Event	Time	Rank	Time	Rank	Time	Rank
Dong Zhihao	100 metre breaststroke	59.97	13 Q	1:00.45	16	Did not advance	
Dong Zhihao	200 metre breaststroke	2:11.13	7 Q	2:09.16	2 Q	2:07.94	1st place, gold medalist(s)
Fei Liwei	400 metre freestyle	3:47.06	13	—		Did not advance	
Fei Liwei	800 metre freestyle	7:51.18	16	—		Did not advance	
Fei Liwei	1500 metre freestyle	14:54.36	7 Q	—		14:50.51	7
Ji Xinjie	200 metre freestyle	1:47.13	12 Q	1:46.92	12	Did not advance	
Pan Zhanle	50 metre freestyle	Did not start		Did not advance			
Pan Zhanle	100 metre freestyle	47.82	1 Q	47.73	1 Q	47.53	1st place, gold medalist(s)
Pan Zhanle	200 metre freestyle	1:51.03	38	Did not advance			
Wang Haoyu	100 metre freestyle	48.61	9 Q	48.11	6 Q	48.06	7
Wang Xizhe	100 metre butterfly	53.10	24	Did not advance			
Wang Xizhe	200 metre butterfly	1:59.32	23	Did not advance			
Xu Yifan	50 metre backstroke	26.37	33	Did not advance			
Zhang Zhanshuo	400 metre freestyle	3:46.46	10	—		Did not advance	
Zhang Zhanshuo	800 metre freestyle	7:55.86	23	—		Did not advance	
Zhang Zhanshuo	1500 metre freestyle	15:20.69	21	—		Did not advance	
Zhang Zhanshuo	200 metre individual medley	1:59.87	7 Q	1:58.98	8 Q	1:59.17	8
Zhang Zhanshuo	400 metre individual medley	4:19.86	12	—		Did not advance	
Pan Zhanle; Ji Xinjie; Zhang Zhanshuo; Wang Haoyu	4 × 100 m freestyle relay	3:14.07	4 Q	—		3:11.08	1st place, gold medalist(s)
Pan Zhanle; Ji Xinjie; Zhang Zhanshuo; Wang Haoyu	4 × 200 m freestyle relay	7:06.93	1 Q	—		7:01.84 NR	1st place, gold medalist(s)
Xu Yifan; Dong Zhihao; Wang Xizhe; Ji Xinjie	4 × 100 m medley relay	3:36.68	12	—		Did not advance	

Women

Athlete	Event	Heat		Semifinal		Final	
Athlete	Event	Time	Rank	Time	Rank	Time	Rank
Ai Yanhan	100 metre freestyle	55.19	15 WD	Did not advance			
Ai Yanhan	200 metre freestyle	1:58.06	5 Q	1:57.33	10 Q	1:57.53	8
Chen Xin	100 metre backstroke	1:02.49	23	Did not advance			
Chen Jie	50 metre backstroke	28.67	18	Did not advance			
Gong Zhenqi	100 metre butterfly	59.87	20	Did not advance			
Li Bingjie	200 metre freestyle	1:57.16	1 Q	1:57.13	7 WD	Did not advance	
Li Bingjie	400 metre freestyle	4:04.65	1 Q	—		4:01.62	2nd place, silver medalist(s)
Li Bingjie	1500 metre freestyle	16:13.61	3 Q	—		15:56.62	2nd place, silver medalist(s)
Lyu Yue	50 metre freestyle	25.10	15 Q	25.04	15	Did not advance	
Ma Yonghui	800 metre freestyle	8:37.66	12	—		Did not advance	
Ma Yonghui	200 metre butterfly	2:09.50	3 Q	2:08.73	5 Q	2:08.77	5
Mao Yihan	400 metre individual medley	4:46.88	12	—		Did not advance	
Sun Mingxia	200 metre backstroke	2:11.79	10 Q	2:12.07	14	Did not advance	
Tang Qianting	50 metre breaststroke	29.93	2 Q	29.80 AS	2 Q	29.51 AS	2nd place, silver medalist(s)
Tang Qianting	100 metre breaststroke	1:06.16	1 Q	1:05.36	1 Q	1:05.27 NR	1st place, gold medalist(s)
Yang Peiqi	400 metre freestyle	4:06.82	7 Q	—		4:05.73	6
Yang Peiqi	800 metre freestyle	8:36.75	10	—		Did not advance	
Yang Peiqi	1500 metre freestyle	16:14.85	6 Q	—		16:13.08	6
Yang Chang	50 metre breaststroke	31.02	13 Q	30.86	11	Did not advance	
Yang Chang	100 metre breaststroke	1:06.80	5 Q	1:06.27	3 Q	1:06.75	7
Yu Yiting	50 metre butterfly	26.06	10 Q	25.81	4 WD	Did not advance	
Yu Yiting	200 metre individual medley	2:11.53	4 Q	2:08.83	3 Q	2:09.01	3rd place, bronze medalist(s)
Ai Yanhan; Ma Yonghui; Gong Zhenqi; Lyu Yue	4 × 100 m freestyle relay	3:41.75	7	—		3:41.11	7
Ai Yanhan; Gong Zhenqi; Li Bingjie; Yang Peiqi; Ma Yonghui	4 × 200 m freestyle relay	7:54.38	1 Q	—		7:47.26	1st place, gold medalist(s)
Sun Mingxia; Tang Qianting; Yu Yiting; Ai Yanhan; Yang Chang	4 × 100 m medley relay	4:02.22	5 Q	—		3:59.16	4

Mixed

Athlete	Event	Heat		Semifinal		Final	
Athlete	Event	Time	Rank	Time	Rank	Time	Rank
Pan Zhanle; Wang Haoyu; Li Bingjie; Yu Yiting; Ji Xinjie; Ai Yanhan	4 × 100 m freestyle relay	3:24.47 AS	1 Q	—		3:21.18 AS	1st place, gold medalist(s)
Chen Jie; Dong Zhihao; Yu Yiting; Ji Xinjie	4 × 100 m medley relay	3:48.16	11	—		Did not advance	

== Water polo ==
Summary

Team	Event	Group stage				Playoff	Quarterfinal	Semifinal	Final / BM	
Team	Event	Opposition Score	Opposition Score	Opposition Score	Rank	Opposition Score	Opposition Score	Opposition Score	Opposition Score	Rank
China	Men's tournament	Greece; L 6–24	France; L 9–16	Brazil; W 10-8	3 QP	Croatia; L 4–22	—	Romania; L 7–9	Australia; L 7–17	12
China	Women's tournament	Spain; L 5–18	France; W 11–10	Greece; L 9–22	3 QP	Netherlands; L 14–16	—	Great Britain; W 16–10	New Zealand; L 15-16	10

=== Men's tournament ===
Team roster

The following is the Chinese roster.

Head coach: Ivan Asič

- 1 Wu Honghui GK
- 2 Zhu Beile FP
- 3 Chu Chenghao FP
- 4 Peng Jiahao FP
- 5 Zhang Jinpeng FP
- 6 Xie Zekai FP
- 7 Chen Zhongxian FP
- 8 Chen Rui FP
- 9 Chen Yimin FP
- 10 Liu Yu FP
- 11 Zhang Chufeng FP
- 12 Shen Dingsong FP
- 13 Liang Zhiwei GK
- 14 Zhao Yuehao FP
- 15 He Xingmeng FP

Group play

Pos	Team	Pld	W	PSW	PSL	L	GF	GA	GD	Pts	Qualification
1	Greece	3	3	0	0	0	60	22	+38	9	Quarterfinals
2	France	3	2	0	0	1	44	33	+11	6	Playoffs
3	China	3	1	0	0	2	25	48	−23	3	Playoffs
4	Brazil	3	0	0	0	3	23	49	−26	0	13–16th place semifinals

Source: World Aquatics
Rules for classification: 1) points; 2) head-to-head points; 3) head-to-head goal difference; 4) head-to-head number of goals scored; 5) Goal difference.

5 February 2024; 10:30	Report	China	6–24	Greece	Aspire Dome, Doha; Referees: Alessandro Severo (ITA), Stanko Ivanovski (MNE)
5 February 2024; 10:30	Report	Score by quarters: 1–4, 0–6, 3–7, 2–7			Aspire Dome, Doha; Referees: Alessandro Severo (ITA), Stanko Ivanovski (MNE)
5 February 2024; 10:30	Report	Xie 2	Goals	Genidounias 5	Aspire Dome, Doha; Referees: Alessandro Severo (ITA), Stanko Ivanovski (MNE)

7 February 2024; 09:00	Report	France	16–9	China	Aspire Dome, Doha; Referees: Stanko Ivanovski (MNE), Andreia Stanojević (SRB)
7 February 2024; 09:00	Report	Score by quarters: 3–3, 4–2, 2–1, 7–3			Aspire Dome, Doha; Referees: Stanko Ivanovski (MNE), Andreia Stanojević (SRB)
7 February 2024; 09:00	Report	Vernoux 6	Goals	Chen Z. 3	Aspire Dome, Doha; Referees: Stanko Ivanovski (MNE), Andreia Stanojević (SRB)

9 February 2024; 20:30	Report	Brazil	8–10	China	Aspire Dome, Doha; Referees: Alessandro Severo (ITA), David Couper (NZL)
9 February 2024; 20:30	Report	Score by quarters: 3–2, 2–1, 1–3, 2–4			Aspire Dome, Doha; Referees: Alessandro Severo (ITA), David Couper (NZL)
9 February 2024; 20:30	Report	Freitas 3	Goals	Chen Z. 3	Aspire Dome, Doha; Referees: Alessandro Severo (ITA), David Couper (NZL)

Playoffs

11 February 2024; 12:00	Report	Croatia	22–4	China	Aspire Dome, Doha; Referees: Sébastien Dervieux (FRA), Stanko Ivanovski (MNE)
11 February 2024; 12:00	Report	Score by quarters: 5–2, 5–1, 6–1, 6–0			Aspire Dome, Doha; Referees: Sébastien Dervieux (FRA), Stanko Ivanovski (MNE)
11 February 2024; 12:00	Report	Kharkov 4	Goals	four players 1	Aspire Dome, Doha; Referees: Sébastien Dervieux (FRA), Stanko Ivanovski (MNE)

9–12th place semifinals

13 February 2024; 12:00	Report	China	7–9	Romania	Aspire Dome, Doha; Referees: György Kun (HUN), Andreia Stanojević (SRB)
13 February 2024; 12:00	Report	Score by quarters: 2–1, 2–2, 1–4, 2–2			Aspire Dome, Doha; Referees: György Kun (HUN), Andreia Stanojević (SRB)
13 February 2024; 12:00	Report	Chen Z., Zhang C. 3	Goals	Georgescu 3	Aspire Dome, Doha; Referees: György Kun (HUN), Andreia Stanojević (SRB)

Eleventh place game

15 February 2024; 09:00	Report	China	7–17	Australia	Aspire Dome, Doha; Referees: Andreia Stanojević (SRB), Hélène Painchaud (CAN)
15 February 2024; 09:00	Report	Score by quarters: 2–8, 0–4, 1–4, 4–1			Aspire Dome, Doha; Referees: Andreia Stanojević (SRB), Hélène Painchaud (CAN)
15 February 2024; 09:00	Report	Chen Z. 3	Goals	Maksimović, Mercep 4	Aspire Dome, Doha; Referees: Andreia Stanojević (SRB), Hélène Painchaud (CAN)

=== Women's tournament ===
Team roster

The following is the Chinese roster.

Head coach: Juan Jané

- 1 Zhang Jiaqi GK
- 2 Yan Siya FP
- 3 Yan Jing FP
- 4 Xiong Dunhan FP
- 5 Zhong Qiyun FP
- 6 Wang Shiyun FP
- 7 Lu Yiwen FP
- 8 Wang Huan FP
- 9 Deng Zewen FP
- 10 Nong Sanfeng FP
- 11 Li Ziqi FP
- 12 Zhang Jing FP
- 13 Dong Wenxin GK
- 14 Wang Xuan FP
- 15 Xie Liyi FP

Group play

Pos	Team	Pld	W	PSW	PSL	L	GF	GA	GD	Pts	Qualification
1	Spain	3	3	0	0	0	48	20	+28	9	Quarterfinals
2	Greece	3	2	0	0	1	41	31	+10	6	Playoffs
3	China	3	0	1	0	2	20	46	−26	2	Playoffs
4	France	3	0	0	1	2	19	31	−12	1	13–16th place semifinals

Source: World Aquatics
Rules for classification: 1) points; 2) head-to-head points; 3) head-to-head goal difference; 4) head-to-head number of goals scored; 5) Goal difference.

4 February 2024; 10:30	Report	China	5–18	Spain	Aspire Dome, Doha; Referees: Ashley Kaeshler (AUS), Andreia Stanojević (SRB)
4 February 2024; 10:30	Report	Score by quarters: 2–3, 2–5, 1–4, 0–6			Aspire Dome, Doha; Referees: Ashley Kaeshler (AUS), Andreia Stanojević (SRB)
4 February 2024; 10:30	Report	Lu 2	Goals	Crespí 4	Aspire Dome, Doha; Referees: Ashley Kaeshler (AUS), Andreia Stanojević (SRB)

6 February 2024; 09:00	Report	France	10–11	China	Aspire Dome, Doha; Referees: Nóra Debreceni (HUN), Helen Painchaud (CAN)
6 February 2024; 09:00	Report	Score by quarters: 0–2, 2–1, 3–3, 1–0 PSO: 4–5			Aspire Dome, Doha; Referees: Nóra Debreceni (HUN), Helen Painchaud (CAN)
6 February 2024; 09:00	Report	Battu, Bouloukbakchi 2	Goals	Zhang J. 5	Aspire Dome, Doha; Referees: Nóra Debreceni (HUN), Helen Painchaud (CAN)

8 February 2024; 20:30	Report	Greece	22–9	China	Aspire Dome, Doha; Referees: Nóra Debreceni (HUN), Lucas Letshabo (RSA)
8 February 2024; 20:30	Report	Score by quarters: 7–2, 4–2, 6–1, 5–4			Aspire Dome, Doha; Referees: Nóra Debreceni (HUN), Lucas Letshabo (RSA)
8 February 2024; 20:30	Report	Ninou, Plevritou 4	Goals	Deng 3	Aspire Dome, Doha; Referees: Nóra Debreceni (HUN), Lucas Letshabo (RSA)

Playoffs

10 February 2024; 12:00	Report	Netherlands	16–14	China	Aspire Dome, Doha; Referees: Jennifer McCall (USA), Lucas Letshabo (RSA)
10 February 2024; 12:00	Report	Score by quarters: 5–5, 3–2, 5–4, 3–3			Aspire Dome, Doha; Referees: Jennifer McCall (USA), Lucas Letshabo (RSA)
10 February 2024; 12:00	Report	three players 3	Goals	Lu 5	Aspire Dome, Doha; Referees: Jennifer McCall (USA), Lucas Letshabo (RSA)

9–12th place semifinals

12 February 2024; 12:00	Report	China	15–10	Great Britain	Aspire Dome, Doha; Referees: Asumi Tsuzaki (JPN), Nóra Debreceni (HUN)
12 February 2024; 12:00	Report	Score by quarters: 4–2, 5–3, 2–1, 4–4			Aspire Dome, Doha; Referees: Asumi Tsuzaki (JPN), Nóra Debreceni (HUN)
12 February 2024; 12:00	Report	three players 3	Goals	Turner 4	Aspire Dome, Doha; Referees: Asumi Tsuzaki (JPN), Nóra Debreceni (HUN)

Ninth place game

14 February 2024; 10:30	Report	China	15–16	New Zealand	Aspire Dome, Doha; Referees: Viktor Salnichenko (KAZ), Giuliana Nicolosi (ITA)
14 February 2024; 10:30	Report	Score by quarters: 4–4, 3–5, 3–4, 5–3			Aspire Dome, Doha; Referees: Viktor Salnichenko (KAZ), Giuliana Nicolosi (ITA)
14 February 2024; 10:30	Report	Lu 5	Goals	Houghton 5	Aspire Dome, Doha; Referees: Viktor Salnichenko (KAZ), Giuliana Nicolosi (ITA)
