= Artistic swimming at the 2024 World Aquatics Championships =

- Host city: Doha, Qatar
- Date(s): 2–10 February
- Venue(s): Aspire Dome
- Events: 11

The artistic swimming events at the 2024 World Aquatics Championships was held from 2 to 10 February 2024 at the Aspire Dome in Doha, Qatar.

== Schedule ==
11 events were held.

All times are local (UTC+3).

Date	Time	Event
2 February 2024	09:30	Women solo technical
2 February 2024	12:00	Men solo technical
2 February 2024	14:00	Women duet technical Group B
2 February 2024	20:00	Women duet technical Group A
3 February 2024	10:00	Mixed duet technical
3 February 2024	14:00	Women solo technical
3 February 2024	20:00	Acrobatic routine
4 February 2024	09:30	Solo free women
4 February 2024	14:00	Acrobatic routine
4 February 2024	20:00	Mixed duet technical
5 February 2024	09:30	Team technical
5 February 2024	14:00	Women duet technical
5 February 2024	20:00	Men solo technical
6 February 2024	09:30	Men solo free
6 February 2024	14:00	Team technical
6 February 2024	20:00	Women solo free
7 February 2024	09:30	Women duet free Group B
7 February 2024	14:00	Women duet free Group A
7 February 2024	20:00	Men solo free
8 February 2024	09:30	Team free
8 February 2024	14:00	Women duet free
9 February 2024	09:30	Mixed duet free
9 February 2024	14:00	Team free
10 February 2024	09:30	Mixed duet free
10 February 2024	12:00	Gala exhibition

== Medal summary ==
=== Medal table ===
* Host nation (Qatar)

Rank	Nation	Gold	Silver	Bronze	Total
1	China	7	1	1	9
2	Canada	1	1	0	2
2	Greece	1	1	0	2
2	Italy	1	1	0	2
5	Kazakhstan	1	0	0	1
6	Spain	0	3	1	4
7	Great Britain	0	1	1	2
7	Japan	0	1	1	2
9	Netherlands	0	1	0	1
9	Ukraine	0	1	0	1
11	Colombia	0	0	2	2
11	Mexico	0	0	2	2
11	United States	0	0	2	2
14	Neutral Independent Athletes (Note: In accordance with sanctions imposed following by the 2022 Russian invasion of Ukraine, athletes from Belarus were not permitted to use the name, flag, or anthem of Belarus. They instead participated as "Neutral Independent Athletes (NIA)" and under the World Aquatics flag.)	0	0	1	1
Totals (14 entries)		11	11	11	33

Source: Worldaquatics

=== Men ===
Event	Gold		Silver		Bronze	
Solo free routine	Giorgio Minisini; Italy	210.1355	Dennis González; Spain	196.2750	Gustavo Sánchez; Colombia	192.0812
Solo technical routine	Yang Shuncheng; China	246.4766	Giorgio Minisini; Italy	245.3166	Gustavo Sánchez; Colombia	231.0000

=== Women ===
Event	Gold		Silver		Bronze	
Solo free routine	Jacqueline Simoneau; Canada	264.8207	Evangelia Platanioti; Greece	253.2833	Vasilina Khandoshka; Neutral Independent Athletes	245.1042
Solo technical routine	Evangelia Platanioti; Greece	272.9633	Jacqueline Simoneau; Canada	269.2767	Xu Huiyan; China	262.3700
Duet free routine	China; Wang Liuyi; Wang Qianyi	250.7729	Netherlands; Bregje de Brouwer; Noortje de Brouwer	250.4979	Great Britain; Kate Shortman; Isabelle Thorpe	247.2626
Duet technical routine	China; Wang Liuyi; Wang Qianyi	266.0484	Great Britain; Kate Shortman; Isabelle Thorpe	259.5601	Spain; Alisa Ozhogina; Iris Tió	258.0333

=== Mixed ===
Event	Gold		Silver		Bronze	
Duet free routine	China; Cheng Wentao; Shi Haoyu	224.1437	Spain; Dennis González; Mireia Hernández	208.3583	Mexico; Miranda Barrera; Diego Villalobos	192.5772
Duet technical routine	Kazakhstan; Nargiza Bolatova; Eduard Kim	228.0050	China; Cheng Wentao; Shi Haoyu	223.3166	Mexico; Trinidad Meza; Diego Villalobos	217.5192

=== Team ===
Event	Gold		Silver		Bronze	
Acrobatic routine	China; Chang Hao; Feng Yu; Wang Ciyue; Wang Liuyi; Wang Qianyi; Xiang Binxuan; Xiao Yanning; Zhang Yayi	244.1767	Ukraine; Maryna Aleksiiva; Vladyslava Aleksiiva; Marta Fiedina; Oleksandra Goretska; Veronika Hryshko; Daria Moshynska; Anastasiia Shmonina; Valeriya Tyshchenko	243.3167	United States; Anita Álvarez; Jaime Czarkowski; Nicole Dzurko; Keana Hunter; Audrey Kwon; Calista Liu; Bill May; Daniella Ramirez	242.2300
Free routine	China; Chang Hao; Feng Yu; Wang Ciyue; Wang Liuyi; Wang Qianyi; Xiang Binxuan; Xiao Yanning; Zhang Yayi	339.7604	Japan; Moe Higa; Moeka Kijima; Uta Kobayashi; Tomoka Sato; Ayano Shimada; Ami Wada; Mashiro Yasunaga; Megumu Yoshida	315.2229	United States; Anita Alvarez; Daniella Ramirez; Jacklyn Luu; Calista Liu; Audrey Kwon; Megumi Field; Jaime Czarkowski; Natalia Vega Figueroa	304.9021
Technical routine	China; Chang Hao; Feng Yu; Wang Ciyue; Wang Liuyi; Wang Qianyi; Xiang Binxuan; Xiao Yanning; Zhang Yayi	299.8712	Spain; Marina García Polo; Lilou Lluis Valette; Meritxell Mas; Alisa Ozhogina; Paula Ramírez; Sara Saldaña; Iris Tió; Blanca Toledano	275.8925	Japan; Moe Higa; Moeka Kijima; Uta Kobayashi; Tomoka Sato; Ayano Shimada; Ami Wada; Mashiro Yasunaga; Megumu Yoshida	275.8787
