= Sofiia Matsiievska =

Ukrainian synchronised swimmer

Personal information
- Nationality: Ukrainian
- Born: 3 September 2004 (age 21)

Sport
- Sport: Swimming
- Strokes: Synchronised swimming
Medal record
Women's artistic swimming
Representing Ukraine
Event	1st	2nd	3rd
World Championships	2	1	0
European Championships	2	0	0
European Games	0	1	0
European Junior Championships	1	5	0
Total	5	7	0
World Championships
Gold medal – first place	2022 Budapest	Free routine combination
Gold medal – first place	2022 Budapest	Highlight routine
Silver medal – second place	2022 Budapest	Team free routine
European Championships
Gold medal – first place	2022 Rome	Combination routine
Gold medal – first place	2022 Rome	Highlights routine
European Games
Silver medal – second place	2023 Kraków-Małopolska	Team acrobatic routine
European Junior Championships
Gold medal – first place	2021 Valletta	Highlights routine
Silver medal – second place	2021 Valletta	Team free routine
Silver medal – second place	2021 Valletta	Free routine combination
Silver medal – second place	2021 Valletta	Team technical routine
Silver medal – second place	2021 Valletta	Duet technical routine
Silver medal – second place	2021 Valletta	Duet free routine

Sofiia Matsiievska (Ukrainian: Софія Богданівна Мацієвська; born 3 September 2004) is a Ukrainian synchronised swimmer. She is a two-time World champion and two-time European champion. She represents Kharkiv Oblast.
