= Artistic swimming at the 2024 World Aquatics Championships – Team technical routine =

Team technical routine at the 2024 World Aquatics Championships
- Venue: Aspire Dome
- Location: Doha, Qatar
- Dates: 5 February (preliminary); 6 February (final)
- Competitors: 136 from 17 nations
- Teams: 17
- Winning points: 299.8712

Medalists
| gold medal | Chang Hao; Feng Yu; Wang Ciyue; Wang Liuyi; Wang Qianyi; Xiang Binxuan; Xiao Yanning; Zhang Yayi | China |
| silver medal | Marina García Polo; Lilou Lluis Valette; Meritxell Mas; Alisa Ozhogina; Paula Ramírez; Sara Saldaña; Iris Tió; Blanca Toledano | Spain |
| bronze medal | Moe Higa; Moeka Kijima; Uta Kobayashi; Tomoka Sato; Ayano Shimada; Ami Wada; Mashiro Yasunaga; Megumu Yoshida | Japan |

The Team technical routine competition at the 2024 World Aquatics Championships was held on 5 and 6 February 2024.

== Results ==
Green denotes finalists The preliminary round was started on 5 February at 09:30. The final was held on 6 February at 14:00.

| Rank | Nation | Preliminary | | Final | |
| Rank | Nation | Points | Rank | Points | Rank |
|---|---|---|---|---|---|
| 1st place, gold medalist(s) | China | 304.1272 | 1 | 299.8712 | 1 |
| 2nd place, silver medalist(s) | Spain | 278.0675 | 3 | 275.8925 | 2 |
| 3rd place, bronze medalist(s) | Japan | 282.4379 | 2 | 275.8787 | 3 |
| 4 | United States | 273.2900 | 4 | 266.9333 | 4 |
| 5 | Italy | 242.4208 | 6 | 260.8183 | 5 |
| 6 | Canada | 259.4950 | 5 | 253.3550 | 6 |
| 7 | Israel | 226.3484 | 8 | 237.6533 | 7 |
| 8 | Australia | 220.6945 | 9 | 224.0447 | 8 |
| 9 | Kazakhstan | 212.8557 | 10 | 223.2108 | 9 |
| 10 | Ukraine | 234.8733 | 7 | 206.7175 | 10 |
| 11 | Slovakia | 201.9179 | 11 | 201.5421 | 11 |
| 12 | Thailand | 189.9891 | 12 | 187.8733 | 12 |
| 13 | Egypt | 189.2367 | 13 | Did not advance | |
| 14 | Greece | 185.5846 | 14 | Did not advance | |
| 15 | Brazil | 183.5283 | 15 | Did not advance | |
| 16 | Costa Rica | 147.7479 | 16 | Did not advance | |
| 17 | South Africa | 118.8650 | 17 | Did not advance | |
