= Anhelina Ovchynnikova =

Ukrainian synchronised swimmer

Personal information
- Nationality: Ukrainian
- Born: 9 December 2003 (age 22)

Sport
- Sport: Swimming
- Strokes: Synchronised swimming
Medal record
Women's artistic swimming
Representing Ukraine
Event	1st	2nd	3rd
World Championships	2	1	1
European Championships	4	0	0
European Games	0	1	0
European Junior Championships	1	5	1
Total	7	7	2
World Championships
Gold medal – first place	2022 Budapest	Free routine combination
Gold medal – first place	2022 Budapest	Highlight routine
Silver medal – second place	2022 Budapest	Team free routine
Bronze medal – third place	2023 Fukuoka	Team free routine
European Games
Silver medal – second place	2023 Kraków-Małopolska	Team acrobatic routine
European Championships
Gold medal – first place	2022 Rome	Team free routine
Gold medal – first place	2022 Rome	Team technical routine
Gold medal – first place	2022 Rome	Combination routine
Gold medal – first place	2022 Rome	Highlights routine
European Junior Championships
Gold medal – first place	2021 Valletta	Highlights routine
Silver medal – second place	2019 Prague	Team technical routine
Silver medal – second place	2019 Prague	Team free routine
Silver medal – second place	2021 Valletta	Free routine combination
Silver medal – second place	2021 Valletta	Team free routine
Silver medal – second place	2021 Valletta	Team technical routine
Bronze medal – third place	2019 Prague	Free routine combination

Anhelina Ovchynnikova (Ukrainian: Ангеліна Олександрівна Овчиннікова; born 9 December 2003) is a Ukrainian synchronised swimmer. She is a World champion and multiple European champion. She represents Kharkiv Oblast.
