= Artistic swimming at the 2024 World Aquatics Championships – Team free routine =

Team free routine at the 2024 World Aquatics Championships
- Venue: Aspire Dome
- Location: Doha, Qatar
- Dates: 8 February (preliminary); 9 February (final)
- Competitors: 120 from 15 nations
- Teams: 15
- Winning points: 339.7604

Medalists
gold medal	Chang Hao; Cheng Wentao; Feng Yu; Li Xiuchen; Wang Ciyue; Xiang Binxuan; Xiao Yanning; Zhang Yayi	China
silver medal	Moe Higa; Moeka Kijima; Uta Kobayashi; Tomoka Sato; Ami Wada; Akane Yanagisawa; Mashiro Yasunaga; Megumu Yoshida	Japan
bronze medal	Anita Álvarez; Jaime Czarkowski; Megumi Field; Audrey Kwon; Calista Liu; Jacklyn Luu; Daniella Ramirez; Natalia Vega	United States

The Team free routine competition at the 2024 World Aquatics Championships was held on 8 and 9 February 2024.

== Results ==
The preliminary round was started on 8 February at 09:30. The final was held on 9 February at 14:00.

Green denotes finalists

Rank	Nation	Preliminary		Final	
Rank	Nation	Points	Rank	Points	Rank
1st place, gold medalist(s)	China	338.4981	1	339.7604	1
2nd place, silver medalist(s)	Japan	319.4124	2	315.2229	2
3rd place, bronze medalist(s)	United States	305.8229	4	304.9021	3
4	Spain	308.2480	3	302.8228	4
5	Italy	289.0522	6	282.4312	5
6	Greece	270.9751	8	267.8292	6
7	Canada	268.5854	9	263.3980	7
8	Israel	282.3667	7	259.3188	8
9	Ukraine	297.2999	5	233.5229	9
10	Australia	222.7791	10	229.6751	10
11	Brazil	219.9521	11	225.0126	11
12	Kazakhstan	213.4418	12	208.2312	12
13	Slovakia	196.4710	13	Did not advance	
14	Thailand	186.8813	14	Did not advance	
15	Egypt	182.5937	15	Did not advance	
	Costa Rica	Did not start			
