= Swimming at the 2024 World Aquatics Championships – Women's 200 metre individual medley =

Women's 200 metre individual medley at the 2024 World Aquatics Championships
- Venue: Aspire Dome
- Location: Doha, Qatar
- Dates: 11 February (heats and semifinals); 12 February (final)
- Competitors: 25 from 23 nations
- Winning time: 2:07.05

Medalists
gold medal	Kate Douglass	United States
silver medal	Sydney Pickrem	Canada
bronze medal	Yu Yiting	China

The Women's 200 metre individual medley competition at the 2024 World Aquatics Championships was held on 11 and 12 February 2024.

== Qualification ==
Each National Federation was permitted to enter a maximum of two qualified athletes in each individual event, but only if both of them had attained the "A" standard qualification time at approved qualifying events. For this event, the "A" standard qualification time was 2:12.98. Federations could enter one athlete into the event if they met the "B" standard qualification time. For this event, the "B" standard qualification time was 2:17.63. Athletes could also enter the event if they had met an "A" or "B" standard in a different event and their Federation had not entered anyone else. Additional considerations applied to Federations who had few swimmers enter through the standard qualification times. Federations in this category could at least enter two men and two women into the competition, all of whom could enter into up to two events.

== Records ==
Prior to the competition, the existing world and championship records were as follows.

World record	Katinka Hosszú (HUN)	2:06.12	Kazan, Russia	3 August 2015
Competition record	Katinka Hosszú (HUN)	2:06.12	Kazan, Russia	3 August 2015

== Results ==
=== Heats ===
The heats were started on 11 February at 09:32.

Rank	Heat	Lane	Name	Nationality	Time	Notes
1	3	4	Kate Douglass	United States	2:10.01	Q
2	2	4	Sydney Pickrem	Canada	2:10.97	Q
3	1	4	Marrit Steenbergen	Netherlands	2:11.45	Q
4	1	3	Yu Yiting	China	2:11.53	Q
5	1	5	Abbie Wood	Great Britain	2:11.57	Q
6	2	3	Charlotte Bonnet	France	2:12.32	Q
7	2	6	Ashley McMillan	Canada	2:12.65	Q
8	3	5	Anastasia Gorbenko	Israel	2:12.76	Q
9	2	5	Sara Franceschi	Italy	2:13.66	Q
10	3	3	Kim Seo-yeong	South Korea	2:13.85	Q
11	1	2	Lena Kreundl	Austria	2:14.03	Q
12	3	2	Kristen Romano	Puerto Rico	2:14.24	Q
13	2	2	Letitia Sim	Singapore	2:14.26	Q-->WD
14	3	6	Dalma Sebestyen	Hungary	2:14.27	Q
15	1	6	Cyrielle Duhamel	France	2:15.24	Q
16	3	7	Tamara Potocká	Slovakia	2:15.69	Q
17	1	7	Stefanía Gómez	Colombia	2:16.22	Q
18	3	1	McKenna DeBever	Peru	2:16.52	
19	2	7	Kamonchanok Kwanmuang	Thailand	2:17.48	
20	2	8	Stephanie Iannaccone	Guatemala	2:18.45	NR
21	2	1	Nicole Frank	Uruguay	2:20.66	
22	1	1	Valerie Tarazi	Palestine	2:22.88	
23	1	8	Inana Soleman	Syria	2:27.15	NR
24	3	0	Mok Sze Ki	Hong Kong	2:29.14	
25	3	8	Hamna Ahmed	Maldives	2:54.15	

=== Semifinals ===
The semifinals were started on 11 February at 20:01.

Rank	Heat	Lane	Name	Nationality	Time	Notes
1	2	4	Kate Douglass	United States	2:08.41	Q
2	1	4	Sydney Pickrem	Canada	2:08.76	Q
3	1	5	Yu Yiting	China	2:08.83	Q
4	1	6	Anastasia Gorbenko	Israel	2:10.15	Q
5	1	3	Charlotte Bonnet	France	2:10.24	Q
6	2	5	Marrit Steenbergen	Netherlands	2:11.23	Q
7	2	3	Abbie Wood	Great Britain	2:11.35	Q
8	2	6	Ashley McMillan	Canada	2:12.23	Q
9	2	2	Sara Franceschi	Italy	2:12.34	
10	1	2	Kim Seo-yeong	South Korea	2:12.72	
11	2	1	Dalma Sebestyen	Hungary	2:13.25	
12	1	7	Kristen Romano	Puerto Rico	2:13.33	
13	2	7	Lena Kreundl	Austria	2:13.72	
14	1	1	Cyrielle Duhamel	France	2:13.93	
15	2	8	Tamara Potocká	Slovakia	2:15.36	
16	1	8	Stefanía Gómez	Colombia	2:19.30	

=== Final ===
The final was held on 12 February at 20:23.

Rank	Lane	Name	Nationality	Time	Notes
1st place, gold medalist(s)	4	Kate Douglass	United States	2:07.05	
2nd place, silver medalist(s)	5	Sydney Pickrem	Canada	2:08.56	
3rd place, bronze medalist(s)	3	Yu Yiting	China	2:09.01	
4	6	Anastasia Gorbenko	Israel	2:10.17	
5	7	Marrit Steenbergen	Netherlands	2:10.24	
6	1	Abbie Wood	Great Britain	2:11.20	
7	2	Charlotte Bonnet	France	2:11.23	
8	8	Ashley McMillan	Canada	2:13.48	

== Sources ==
- "Competition Regulations" (PDF). World Aquatics. Archived (PDF) from the original on 15 February 2026.
