= Swimming at the 2024 World Aquatics Championships – Women's 1500 metre freestyle =

Women's 1500 metre freestyle at the Swimming at the 2024 World Aquatics Championships
- Venue: Aspire Dome
- Location: Doha, Qatar
- Dates: 12 February (heats); 13 February (final)
- Competitors: 23 from 19 nations
- Winning time: 15:46.99

Medalists
gold medal	Simona Quadarella	Italy
silver medal	Li Bingjie	China
bronze medal	Isabel Gose	Germany

The Women's 1500 metre freestyle competition at the 2024 World Aquatics Championships was held on 12 and 13 February 2024.

== Qualification ==
Each National Federation was permitted to enter a maximum of two qualified athletes in each individual event, but only if both of them had attained the "A" standard qualification time at approved qualifying events. For this event, the "A" standard qualification time was 16:29.57. Federations could enter one athlete into the event if they met the "B" standard qualification time. For this event, the "B" standard qualification time was 17:04.20. Athletes could also enter the event if they had met an "A" or "B" standard in a different event and their Federation had not entered anyone else. Additional considerations applied to Federations who had few swimmers enter through the standard qualification times. Federations in this category could at least enter two men and two women into the competition, all of whom could enter into up to two events.

== Records ==
Prior to the competition, the existing world and championship records were as follows.

World record	Katie Ledecky (USA)	15:20.48	Indianapolis, United States	16 May 2018
Competition record	Katie Ledecky (USA)	15:25.48	Kazan, Russia	4 August 2015

== Results ==
=== Heats ===
The heats were started on 12 February at 10:46.

Rank	Heat	Lane	Name	Nationality	Time	Notes
1	3	4	Simona Quadarella	Italy	16:02.96	Q
2	3	5	Isabel Gose	Germany	16:10.60	Q
3	2	5	Li Bingjie	China	16:13.61	Q
4	2	3	Maddy Gough	Australia	16:14.48	Q
5	2	4	Anastasiia Kirpichnikova	France	16:14.76	Q
6	2	6	Yang Peiqi	China	16:14.85	Q
7	2	2	Eve Thomas	New Zealand	16:16.43	Q
8	3	2	Kristel Köbrich	Chile	16:16.62	Q
9	3	6	Kate Hurst	United States	16:17.83	
10	2	1	Caitlin Deans	New Zealand	16:17.98	
11	3	7	Agostina Hein	Argentina	16:21.68	
12	3	3	Beatriz Dizotti	Brazil	16:25.90	
13	3	0	Ichika Kajimoto	Japan	16:27.96	
14	3	8	Gan Ching Hwee	Singapore	16:29.74	
15	2	7	Tamila Holub	Portugal	16:31.64	
16	2	0	Ajna Késely	Hungary	16:34.84	
17	3	1	Kayla Han	United States	16:35.02	
18	1	4	Stephanie Houtman	South Africa	16:35.39	
19	2	8	Alisee Pisane	Belgium	16:37.91	
20	3	9	Imani de Jong	Netherlands	16:43.55	
21	2	9	Lucie Hanquet	Belgium	16:48.23	
22	1	5	Nip Tsz Yin	Hong Kong	17:04.85	
23	1	3	Malak Meqdar	Morocco	18:06.86	

=== Final ===
The final were was on 13 February at 19:10.

Rank	Lane	Name	Nationality	Time	Notes
1st place, gold medalist(s)	4	Simona Quadarella	Italy	15:46.99	
2nd place, silver medalist(s)	3	Li Bingjie	China	15:56.62	
3rd place, bronze medalist(s)	5	Isabel Gose	Germany	15:57.55	
4	1	Eve Thomas	New Zealand	16:09.43	
5	2	Anastasiia Kirpichnikova	France	16:12.98	
6	7	Yang Peiqi	China	16:13.08	
7	6	Maddy Gough	Australia	16:16.85	
8	8	Kristel Köbrich	Chile	16:18.90	

== Sources ==
- "Competition Regulations" (PDF). World Aquatics. Archived (PDF) from the original on 15 February 2026.
