= Valeriya Tyshchenko =

Ukrainian synchronised swimmer

Personal information
- Nationality: Ukrainian
- Born: 14 November 2004 (age 21)

Sport
- Sport: Swimming
- Strokes: Synchronised swimming
Medal record
Women's artistic swimming
Representing Ukraine
| Event | 1st | 2nd | 3rd |
|---|---|---|---|
| World Championships | 2 | 2 | 1 |
| European Championships | 4 | 0 | 0 |
| European Games | 0 | 1 | 0 |
| European Junior Championships | 1 | 3 | 0 |
| Total | 7 | 6 | 1 |
World Championships
| Gold medal – first place | 2022 Budapest | Free routine combination |
| Gold medal – first place | 2022 Budapest | Highlight routine |
| Silver medal – second place | 2022 Budapest | Team free routine |
| Silver medal – second place | 2024 Doha | Team acrobatic routine |
| Bronze medal – third place | 2023 Fukuoka | Team free routine |
European Games
| Silver medal – second place | 2023 Kraków-Małopolska | Team acrobatic routine |
European Championships
| Gold medal – first place | 2022 Rome | Team free routine |
| Gold medal – first place | 2022 Rome | Team technical routine |
| Gold medal – first place | 2022 Rome | Combination routine |
| Gold medal – first place | 2022 Rome | Highlights routine |
European Junior Championships
| Gold medal – first place | 2021 Valletta | Highlights routine |
| Silver medal – second place | 2021 Valletta | Team technical routine |
| Silver medal – second place | 2021 Valletta | Team free routine |
| Silver medal – second place | 2021 Valletta | Free routine combination |

Valeriya Tyshchenko (Ukrainian: Валерія Євгенівна Тищенко; born 14 November 2004) is a Ukrainian synchronised swimmer. She is a two-time World champion and multiple European champion. She represents Kharkiv Oblast.
