= Artistic swimming at the 2024 World Aquatics Championships – Team acrobatic routine =

Team acrobatic routine at the 2024 World Aquatics Championships
- Venue: Aspire Dome
- Location: Doha, Qatar
- Dates: 3 February (preliminary); 4 February (final)
- Competitors: 152 from 19 nations
- Teams: 19
- Winning points: 244.1767

Medalists
gold medal	Chang Hao; Feng Yu; Wang Ciyue; Wang Liuyi; Wang Qianyi; Xiang Binxuan; Xiao Yanning; Zhang Yayi	China
silver medal	Maryna Aleksiiva; Vladyslava Aleksiiva; Marta Fiedina; Oleksandra Goretska; Veronika Hryshko; Daria Moshynska; Anastasiia Shmonina; Valeriya Tyshchenko	Ukraine
bronze medal	Anita Álvarez; Jaime Czarkowski; Nicole Dzurko; Keana Hunter; Audrey Kwon; Calista Liu; Bill May; Daniella Ramirez	United States

The Team acrobatic routine competition at the 2024 World Aquatics Championships was held on 3 and 4 February 2024.

== Results ==
The preliminary round was started on 3 February at 19:00. The final was held on 4 February at 14:00.

Rank	Nation	Preliminary		Final	
Rank	Nation	Points	Rank	Points	Rank
1st place, gold medalist(s)	China	247.0233	1	244.1767	1
2nd place, silver medalist(s)	Ukraine	243.2134	2	243.3167	2
3rd place, bronze medalist(s)	United States	220.0534	6	242.2300	3
4	Canada	220.8767	4	222.1367	4
5	Spain	220.3767	5	219.9367	5
6	Italy	209.8799	9	213.3501	6
7	Japan	209.8801	8	206.7434	7
8	Egypt	186.9534	11	196.3433	8
9	Israel	206.8200	10	188.5401	9
10	Mexico	225.0267	3	187.6499	10
11	Chile	182.6333	12	186.8766	11
12	Greece	214.2368	7	173.0234	12
13	Kazakhstan	177.1933	13	Did not advance	
14	Hungary	174.3800	14	Did not advance	
15	Australia	172.9033	15	Did not advance	
16	Slovakia	172.2900	16	Did not advance	
17	Thailand	161.9300	17	Did not advance	
18	Macau	158.0933	18	Did not advance	
19	Brazil	147.3167	19	Did not advance	
