= Italy at the 2024 World Aquatics Championships =

- Flag of Italy
- World Aquatics code: ITA
- National federation: Italian Swimming Federation
- Website: federnuoto.it (in Italian)

in Doha, Qatar
- Competitors: 94 in 6 sports
- Medals Ranked 6th: Gold 3 Silver 10 Bronze 6 Total 19

World Aquatics Championships appearances (overview)
- 1973; 1975; 1978; 1982; 1986; 1991; 1994; 1998; 2001; 2003; 2005; 2007; 2009; 2011; 2013; 2015; 2017; 2019; 2022; 2023; 2024; 2025

Italy competed at the 2024 World Aquatics Championships in Doha, Qatar from 2 to 18 February.

== Medalists ==
Medal	Name	Sport	Event	Date
1st place, gold medalist(s)	Giorgio Minisini	Artistic swimming	Men's solo free routine	7 February 2024
1st place, gold medalist(s)	Simona Quadarella	Swimming	Women's 1500 metre freestyle	13 February 2024
1st place, gold medalist(s)	Simona Quadarella	Swimming	Women's 800 metre freestyle	17 February 2024
2nd place, silver medalist(s)	Lorenzo Marsaglia; Giovanni Tocci	Diving	Men's synchronized 3 metre springboard	4 February 2024
2nd place, silver medalist(s)	Giorgio Minisini	Artistic swimming	Men's solo technical routine	5 February 2024
2nd place, silver medalist(s)	Giulia Gabbrielleschi; Arianna Bridi; Gregorio Paltrinieri; Domenico Acerenza	Open water swimming	Team	8 February 2024
2nd place, silver medalist(s)	Matteo Santoro; Chiara Pellacani	Diving	Mixed synchronized 3 metre springboard	10 February 2024
2nd place, silver medalist(s)	Alessandro Miressi; Lorenzo Zazzeri; Paolo Conte Bonin; Manuel Frigo; Leonardo Deplano	Swimming	Men's 4 × 100 metre freestyle relay	11 February 2024
2nd place, silver medalist(s)	Nicolò Martinenghi	Swimming	Men's 100 metre breaststroke	12 February 2024
2nd place, silver medalist(s)	Nicolò Martinenghi	Swimming	Men's 50 metre breaststroke	14 February 2024
2nd place, silver medalist(s)	Alberto Razzetti	Swimming	Men's 200 metre butterfly	14 February 2024
2nd place, silver medalist(s)	Alessandro Miressi	Swimming	Men's 100 metre freestyle	15 February 2024
2nd place, silver medalist(s)	Italy men's national water polo team: Marco Del Lungo Francesco Di Fulvio Luca Damonte Luca Marziali Andrea Fondelli Giacomo Cannella Vincenzo Renzuto Gonzalo Echenique; Nicholas Presciutti Lorenzo Bruni Edoardo Di Somma Alessandro Velotto Gianmarco Nicosia Francesco Condemi Matteo Iocchi	Water polo	Men's tournament	17 February 2024
3rd place, bronze medalist(s)	Domenico Acerenza	Open water swimming	Men's 5 km	7 February 2024
3rd place, bronze medalist(s)	Gregorio Paltrinieri	Swimming	Men's 800 metre freestyle	14 February 2024
3rd place, bronze medalist(s)	Alberto Razzetti	Swimming	Men's 200 metre individual medley	15 February 2024
3rd place, bronze medalist(s)	Benedetta Pilato	Swimming	Women's 50 metre breaststroke	18 February 2024
3rd place, bronze medalist(s)	Sara Franceschi	Swimming	Women's 400 metre individual medley	18 February 2024
3rd place, bronze medalist(s)	Michele Lamberti; Nicolò Martinenghi; Gianmarco Sansone; Alessandro Miressi; Ludovico Viberti; Federico Burdisso	Swimming	Men's 4 × 100 metre medley relay	18 February 2024

== Competitors ==
The following is the list of competitors in the Championships.

Sport	Men	Women	Total
Artistic swimming	1	9	10
Diving	6	5	11
High diving	2	1	3
Open water swimming	3*	4	7*
Swimming	20*	14	34*
Water polo	15	15	30
Total	46*	48	94*

Gregorio Paltrinieri competed in both open water swimming and pool swimming.

== Artistic swimming ==
Men

Athlete	Event	Preliminaries		Final	
Athlete	Event	Points	Rank	Points	Rank
Giorgio Minisini	Solo technical routine	218.0966	4 Q	245.3166	2nd place, silver medalist(s)
Giorgio Minisini	Solo free routine	174.1583	3 Q	210.1355	1st place, gold medalist(s)

Women

Athlete	Event	Preliminaries		Final	
Athlete	Event	Points	Rank	Points	Rank
Susanna Pedotti	Solo technical routine	238.2967	6 Q	215.0833	9
Susanna Pedotti	Solo free routine	212.4521	7 Q	195.5000	10
Linda Cerruti; Lucrezia Ruggiero	Duet technical routine	252.1400	4 Q	217.7833	9
Linda Cerruti; Lucrezia Ruggiero	Duet free routine	231.1168	8 Q	233.9957	7

Mixed

Athlete	Event	Preliminaries		Final	
Athlete	Event	Points	Rank	Points	Rank
Giorgio Minisini; Susanna Pedotti	Duet technical routine	248.8633	2 Q	204.3316	6
Linda Cerruti; Marta Iacoacci; Sofia Mastroianni; Enrica Piccoli; Lucrezia Ruggiero; Isotta Sportelli; Giulia Vernice; Francesca Zunino	Team technical routine	242.4208	6 Q	260.8183	5
Linda Cerruti; Marta Iacoacci; Sofia Mastroianni; Enrica Piccoli; Lucrezia Ruggiero; Isotta Sportelli; Giulia Vernice; Francesca Zunino	Team free routine	289.0522	6 Q	282.4312	5
Linda Cerruti; Marta Iacoacci; Giorgio Minisini; Enrica Piccoli; Lucrezia Ruggiero; Isotta Sportelli; Giulia Vernice; Francesca Zunino	Team acrobatic routine	209.8799	9 Q	213.3501	6

== Diving ==
Men

Athlete	Event	Preliminaries		Semifinals		Final	
Athlete	Event	Points	Rank	Points	Rank	Points	Rank
Riccardo Giovannini	10 m platform	379.75	13 Q	360.05	16	Did not advance	
Andreas Sargent Larsen	10 m platform	365.85	18 Q	361.15	15	Did not advance	
Lorenzo Marsaglia	1 m springboard	342.90	11 Q	—N/a		378.25	5
Lorenzo Marsaglia	3 m springboard	377.65	16 Q	372.50	12 Q	366.25	12
Giovanni Tocci	1 m springboard	385.05	2 Q	—N/a		388.75	4
Giovanni Tocci	3 m springboard	359.00	21	Did not advance			
Lorenzo Marsaglia; Giovanni Tocci	3 m synchro springboard	—N/a				384.24	2nd place, silver medalist(s)
Andreas Sargent Larsen; Eduard Timbretti Gugiu	10 m synchro platform	—N/a				351.06	10

Women

Athlete	Event	Preliminaries		Semifinals		Final	
Athlete	Event	Points	Rank	Points	Rank	Points	Rank
Elena Bertocchi	1 m springboard	239.95	7 Q	—N/a		236.55	11
Elena Bertocchi	3 m springboard	247.00	17 Q	194.15	18	Did not advance	
Maia Biginelli	10 m platform	263.25	18 Q	241.40	18	Did not advance	
Sarah Jodoin Di Maria	10 m platform	319.45	4 Q	293.75	7 Q	322.15	5
Chiara Pellacani	1 m springboard	193.05	33	—N/a		Did not advance	
Chiara Pellacani	3 m springboard	274.95	10 Q	302.10	3 Q	272.05	10
Elena Bertocchi; Chiara Pellacani	3 m synchro springboard	—N/a				260.28	8

Mixed

Athlete	Event	Final	
Athlete	Event	Points	Rank
Matteo Santoro; Chiara Pellacani	3 m synchro springboard	287.49	2nd place, silver medalist(s)
Eduard Timbretti Gugiu; Irene Pesce	10 m platform	186.36	8
Eduard Timbretti Gugiu; Chiara Pellacani; Irene Pesce; Matteo Santoro	Team event	271.70	10

== High diving ==
Athlete	Event	Points	Rank
Andrea Barnaba	Men's high diving	325.05	9
Davide Baraldi	Men's high diving	315.40	12
Elisa Cosetti	Women's high diving	272.90	8

== Open water swimming ==
Men

Athlete	Event	Time	Rank
Domenico Acerenza	Men's 5 km	51:30.0	3rd place, bronze medalist(s)
Domenico Acerenza	Men's 10 km	1:48:30.4	7
Gregorio Paltrinieri	Men's 5 km	51:31.7	5
Dario Verani	Men's 10 km	1:48:30.8	8

Women

Athlete	Event	Time	Rank
Arianna Bridi	Women's 10 km	1:57:33.2	8
Giulia Gabbrielleschi	Women's 5 km	57:47.6	7
Barbara Pozzobon	Women's 5 km	57:58.5	15
Ginevra Taddeucci	Women's 10 km	1:58:21.1	22

Mixed

Athlete	Event	Time	Rank
Giulia Gabbrielleschi; Arianna Bridi; Gregorio Paltrinieri; Domenico Acerenza	Team relay	1:03:28.2	2nd place, silver medalist(s)

== Swimming ==
Italy entered 34 swimmers.

Men

Athlete	Event	Heat		Semifinal		Final	
Athlete	Event	Time	Rank	Time	Rank	Time	Rank
Federico Burdisso	50 metre butterfly	23.92	28	Did not advance			
Federico Burdisso	200 metre butterfly	1:57.48	14 Q	1:56.68	9	Did not advance	
Simone Cerasuolo	50 metre breaststroke	27.00	8 Q	26.98	5 Q	26.93	6
Matteo Ciampi	200 metre freestyle	1:47.65	24	Did not advance			
Matteo Ciampi	400 metre freestyle	3:47.23	14	—N/a		Did not advance	
Luca De Tullio	800 metre freestyle	7:46.52	1 Q	—N/a		7:49.79	7
Luca De Tullio	1500 metre freestyle	15:00.22	13	—N/a		Did not advance	
Marco De Tullio	200 metre freestyle	1:48.46	29	Did not advance			
Marco De Tullio	400 metre freestyle	3:49.44	24	—N/a		Did not advance	
Leonardo Deplano	50 metre freestyle	21.98	12 Q	21.81	10	Did not advance	
Manuel Frigo	100 metre freestyle	48.65	10 Q	48.25	9	Did not advance	
Michele Lamberti	50 metre backstroke	24.88	7 Q	24.68	6 Q	24.82	7
Michele Lamberti	100 metre backstroke	53.73	5 Q	53.89	11	Did not advance	
Nicolò Martinenghi	50 metre breaststroke	26.75	4 Q	26.65	2 Q	26.39	2nd place, silver medalist(s)
Nicolò Martinenghi	100 metre breaststroke	59.27	2 Q	59.13	4 Q	58.84	2nd place, silver medalist(s)
Alessandro Miressi	100 metre freestyle	47.94	2 Q	47.88	2 Q	47.72	2nd place, silver medalist(s)
Lorenzo Mora	200 metre backstroke	1:59.80	19	Did not advance			
Gregorio Paltrinieri	800 metre freestyle	7:47.38	7 Q	—N/a		7:42.98	3rd place, bronze medalist(s)
Gregorio Paltrinieri	1500 metre freestyle	14:55.19	9	—N/a		Did not advance	
Alberto Razzetti	200 metre butterfly	1:56.53	7 Q	1:55.09	1 Q	1:54.65	2nd place, silver medalist(s)
Alberto Razzetti	200 metre individual medley	2:00.14	9 Q	1:58.21	5 Q	1:57.42	3rd place, bronze medalist(s)
Alberto Razzetti	400 metre individual medley	4:15.84	8 Q	—N/a		4:13.05	5
Gianmarco Sansone	100 metre butterfly	52.46	15 Q	52.15	14		
Ludovico Viberti	100 metre breaststroke	59.86	12 Q	59.61	10	Did not advance	
Lorenzo Zazzeri	50 metre freestyle	21.85	6 Q	21.80	9	Did not advance	
Alessandro Miressi; Lorenzo Zazzeri; Paolo Conte Bonin; Manuel Frigo; Leonardo Deplano	4 × 100 m freestyle relay	3:12.96	2 Q	—N/a		3:12.08	2nd place, silver medalist(s)
Filippo Megli; Alessandro Ragaini; Matteo Ciampi; Stefano Di Cola; Marco De Tullio	4 × 200 m freestyle relay	7:08.48	3 Q	—N/a		7:07.00	5
Michele Lamberti; Nicolò Martinenghi; Gianmarco Sansone; Alessandro Miressi; Ludovico Viberti; Federico Burdisso	4 × 100 m medley relay	3:34.20	6 Q	—N/a		3:31.59	3rd place, bronze medalist(s)

Women

Athlete	Event	Heat		Semifinal		Final	
Athlete	Event	Time	Rank	Time	Rank	Time	Rank
Anita Bottazzo	50 metre breaststroke	30.94	12 Q	30.89	13	Did not advance	
Arianna Castogiloni	100 metre breaststroke	1:07.48	13 Q	1:07.57	16	Did not advance	
Costanza Cocconcelli	50 metre backstroke	28.28	8 Q	28.14	9	Did not advance	
Giulia D'Innocenzo	200 metre freestyle	1:59.57	18	Did not advance			
Francesca Fangio	200 metre breaststroke	2:26.01	6 Q	2:26.39	10	Did not advance	
Sara Franceschi	200 metre breaststroke	2:30.01	19	Did not advance			
Sara Franceschi	200 metre individual medley	2:13.66	9 Q	2:12.34	9	Did not advance	
Sara Franceschi	400 metre individual medley	4:43.61	8 Q	—N/a		4:37.86	3rd place, bronze medalist(s)
Sonia Laquintana	50 metre butterfly	26.84	22	Did not advance			
Sonia Laquintana	100 metre butterfly	1:01.31	27	Did not advance			
Francesca Pasquino	100 metre backstroke	1:01.54	14 Q	1:01.68	16	Did not advance	
Benedetta Pilato	50 metre breaststroke	29.89	1 Q	29.91	3 Q	30.01	3rd place, bronze medalist(s)
Benedetta Pilato	100 metre breaststroke	1:07.24	10 Q	1:06.70	9	Did not advance	
Simona Quadarella	800 metre freestyle	8:27.80	2 Q	—N/a		8:17.44	1st place, gold medalist(s)
Simona Quadarella	1500 metre freestyle	16:02.96	1 Q	—N/a		15:46.99	1st place, gold medalist(s)
Chiara Tarantino	50 metre freestyle	26.09	39	Did not advance			
Chiara Tarantino	100 metre freestyle	54.87	12 Q	54.51	10	Did not advance	
Chiara Tarantino; Sofia Morini; Emma Virginia Menicucci; Costanza Cocconcelli	4 × 100 m freestyle relay	3:39.20	2 Q	—N/a		3:38.67	5
Sofia Morini; Giulia Ramatelli; Emma Menicci; Giulia D'Innocenzo	4 × 200 m freestyle relay	8:00.19	10	—N/a		Did not advance	
Francesca Pasquino; Benedetta Pilato; Costanza Cocconcelli; Chiara Tarantino; Arianna Castiglioni	4 × 100 m medley relay	4:02.62	7 Q	—N/a		4:00.34	6

Mixed

Athlete	Event	Heat		Semifinal		Final	
Athlete	Event	Time	Rank	Time	Rank	Time	Rank
Alessandro Miressi; Manuel Frigo; Sofia Morini; Chiara Tarantino; Lorenzo Zazzeri	4 × 100 m medley relay	3:26.06	4 Q	—N/a		3:24.40	5
Michele Lamberti; Nicolò Martinenghi; Giulia D'Innocenzo; Chiara Tarantino; Ludovico Viberti	4 × 100 m medley relay	3:47.65	8 Q	—N/a		3:47.29	6

== Water polo ==
Summary

Team	Event	Group stage				Playoff	Quarterfinal	Semifinal	Final / BM	
Team	Event	Opposition Score	Opposition Score	Opposition Score	Rank	Opposition Score	Opposition Score	Opposition Score	Opposition Score	Rank
Italy	Men's tournament	Kazakhstan; W 33–3	Hungary; L 14–15	Romania; W 16–10	2 QP	United States; W 13–12	Greece; W 11–10	Spain; W 8–6	Croatia; L 13–15	2nd place, silver medalist(s)
Italy	Women's tournament	Great Britain; W 22–10	South Africa; W 25–3	Canada; W 12–8	1 QF	—N/a	Greece; L 12–14	Netherlands; L 5–10	Canada; W 18-12	7

=== Men's tournament ===
Team roster

The following is the Italian roster.

Head coach: Sandro Campagna

- 1 Marco Del Lungo GK
- 2 Francesco Di Fulvio FP
- 3 Luca Damonte FP
- 4 Luca Marziali FP
- 5 Andrea Fondelli FP
- 6 Giacomo Cannella FP
- 7 Vincenzo Renzuto FP
- 8 Gonzalo Echenique FP
- 9 Nicholas Presciutti FP
- 10 Lorenzo Bruni FP
- 11 Edoardo Di Somma FP
- 12 Alessandro Velotto FP
- 13 Gianmarco Nicosia GK
- 14 Francesco Condemi FP
- 15 Matteo Iocchi FP

Group play

Pos	Team	Pld	W	PSW	PSL	L	GF	GA	GD	Pts	Qualification
1	Hungary	3	2	1	0	0	52	18	+34	8	Quarterfinals
2	Italy	3	2	0	1	0	58	22	+36	7	Playoffs
3	Romania	3	1	0	0	2	43	34	+9	3	Playoffs
4	Kazakhstan	3	0	0	0	3	7	86	−79	0	13–16th place semifinals

Source: World Aquatics
Rules for classification: 1) points; 2) head-to-head points; 3) head-to-head goal difference; 4) head-to-head number of goals scored; 5) Goal difference.

5 February 2024; 19:00	Report	Italy	33–3	Kazakhstan	Aspire Dome, Doha; Referees: Zhang Liang (CHN), Matan Schwartz (ISR)
5 February 2024; 19:00	Report	Score by quarters: 6–1, 10–1, 8–1, 9–0			Aspire Dome, Doha; Referees: Zhang Liang (CHN), Matan Schwartz (ISR)
5 February 2024; 19:00	Report	Cannella, Fondelli 7	Goals	three players 1	Aspire Dome, Doha; Referees: Zhang Liang (CHN), Matan Schwartz (ISR)

7 February 2024; 20:30	Report	Hungary	15–14 (PSO)	Italy	Aspire Dome, Doha; Referees: Georgios Stavridis (GRE), Frank Ohme (GER)
7 February 2024; 20:30	Report	Score by quarters: 2–2, 2–2, 3–3, 2–2 PSO: 6–5			Aspire Dome, Doha; Referees: Georgios Stavridis (GRE), Frank Ohme (GER)
7 February 2024; 20:30	Report	three players 2	Goals	Di Fulvio 3	Aspire Dome, Doha; Referees: Georgios Stavridis (GRE), Frank Ohme (GER)

9 February 2024; 12:00	Report	Romania	10–16	Italy	Aspire Dome, Doha; Referees: Sébastien Dervieux (FRA), Lucas Letshabo (RSA)
9 February 2024; 12:00	Report	Score by quarters: 3–4, 4–4, 2–5, 1–3			Aspire Dome, Doha; Referees: Sébastien Dervieux (FRA), Lucas Letshabo (RSA)
9 February 2024; 12:00	Report	Georgescu 3	Goals	Di Fulvio 5	Aspire Dome, Doha; Referees: Sébastien Dervieux (FRA), Lucas Letshabo (RSA)

Playoffs

11 February 2024; 19:00	Report	United States	12–13	Italy	Aspire Dome, Doha; Referees: Xavi Buch (ESP), Michiel Zwart (NED)
11 February 2024; 19:00	Report	Score by quarters: 3–3, 1–3, 4–4, 4–3			Aspire Dome, Doha; Referees: Xavi Buch (ESP), Michiel Zwart (NED)
11 February 2024; 19:00	Report	Daube 4	Goals	Di Fulvio, Fondelli 3	Aspire Dome, Doha; Referees: Xavi Buch (ESP), Michiel Zwart (NED)

Quarterfinals

13 February 2024; 17:30	Report	Greece	10–11	Italy	Aspire Dome, Doha; Referees: Boris Margeta (SLO), Sébastien Dervieux (FRA)
13 February 2024; 17:30	Report	Score by quarters: 3–1, 2–5, 3–2, 2–3			Aspire Dome, Doha; Referees: Boris Margeta (SLO), Sébastien Dervieux (FRA)
13 February 2024; 17:30	Report	Genidounias 3	Goals	three players 2	Aspire Dome, Doha; Referees: Boris Margeta (SLO), Sébastien Dervieux (FRA)

Semifinals

15 February 2024; 16:00	Report	Spain	6–8	Italy	Aspire Dome, Doha; Referees: Boris Margeta (SLO), György Kun (HUN)
15 February 2024; 16:00	Report	Score by quarters: 1–1, 1–3, 1–2, 3–2			Aspire Dome, Doha; Referees: Boris Margeta (SLO), György Kun (HUN)
15 February 2024; 16:00	Report	Larumbe, Munárriz 2	Goals	three players 2	Aspire Dome, Doha; Referees: Boris Margeta (SLO), György Kun (HUN)

Final

17 February 2024; 17:30	Report	Italy	13–15 (PSO)	Croatia	Aspire Dome, Doha; Referees: Frank Ohme (GER), Sébastien Dervieux (FRA)
17 February 2024; 17:30	Report	Score by quarters: 3–2, 2–3, 2–3, 4–3 PSO: 2–4			Aspire Dome, Doha; Referees: Frank Ohme (GER), Sébastien Dervieux (FRA)
17 February 2024; 17:30	Report	Fondelli 5	Goals	Kharkov 4	Aspire Dome, Doha; Referees: Frank Ohme (GER), Sébastien Dervieux (FRA)

=== Women's tournament ===
Team roster

The following is the Italian roster.

Head coach: Carlo Silipo

- 1 Aurora Condorelli GK
- 2 Chiara Tabani FP
- 3 Giuditta Galardi FP
- 4 Silvia Avegno FP
- 5 Sofia Giustini FP
- 6 Dafne Bettini FP
- 7 Domitilla Picozzi FP
- 8 Roberta Bianconi FP
- 9 Valeria Palmieri FP
- 10 Claudia Marletta FP
- 11 Agnese Cocchiere FP
- 12 Giulia Viacava FP
- 13 Caterina Banchelli GK
- 14 Lucrezia Cergol FP
- 15 Veronica Gant FP

Group play

Pos	Team	Pld	W	PSW	PSL	L	GF	GA	GD	Pts	Qualification
1	Italy	3	3	0	0	0	59	21	+38	9	Quarterfinals
2	Canada	3	2	0	0	1	52	19	+33	6	Playoffs
3	Great Britain	3	1	0	0	2	29	47	−18	3	Playoffs
4	South Africa	3	0	0	0	3	10	63	−53	0	13–16th place semifinals

Source: World Aquatics
Rules for classification: 1) points; 2) head-to-head points; 3) head-to-head goal difference; 4) head-to-head number of goals scored; 5) Goal difference.

4 February 2024; 16:30	Report	Great Britain	10–22	Italy	Aspire Dome, Doha; Referees: Jennifer McCall (USA), Cheng Beng Guan (SGP)
4 February 2024; 16:30	Report	Score by quarters: 3–5, 2–6, 2–6, 3–5			Aspire Dome, Doha; Referees: Jennifer McCall (USA), Cheng Beng Guan (SGP)
4 February 2024; 16:30	Report	Turner 3	Goals	Avegno, Bianconi 4	Aspire Dome, Doha; Referees: Jennifer McCall (USA), Cheng Beng Guan (SGP)

6 February 2024; 16:00	Report	Italy	25–3	South Africa	Aspire Dome, Doha; Referees: Andreia Stanojević (SRB), Yuri Maciel (BRA)
6 February 2024; 16:00	Report	Score by quarters: 6–1, 5–1, 6–1, 8–0			Aspire Dome, Doha; Referees: Andreia Stanojević (SRB), Yuri Maciel (BRA)
6 February 2024; 16:00	Report	Giustini 5	Goals	Versfeld 2	Aspire Dome, Doha; Referees: Andreia Stanojević (SRB), Yuri Maciel (BRA)

8 February 2024; 12:00	Report	Italy	12–8	Canada	Aspire Dome, Doha; Referees: Jennifer McCall (USA), Zhang Liang (CHN)
8 February 2024; 12:00	Report	Score by quarters: 4–4, 4–2, 2–2, 2–0			Aspire Dome, Doha; Referees: Jennifer McCall (USA), Zhang Liang (CHN)
8 February 2024; 12:00	Report	Marletta 4	Goals	Bakoc, Wright 2	Aspire Dome, Doha; Referees: Jennifer McCall (USA), Zhang Liang (CHN)

Quarterfinals

12 February 2024; 20:30	Report	Italy	12–14	Greece	Aspire Dome, Doha; Referees: Matan Schwartz (ISR), Ashleigh Kaeshler (AUS)
12 February 2024; 20:30	Report	Score by quarters: 0–3, 3–4, 4–4, 5–3			Aspire Dome, Doha; Referees: Matan Schwartz (ISR), Ashleigh Kaeshler (AUS)
12 February 2024; 20:30	Report	Picozzi 3	Goals	Ninou 5	Aspire Dome, Doha; Referees: Matan Schwartz (ISR), Ashleigh Kaeshler (AUS)

5–8th place semifinals

14 February 2024; 14:30	Report	Netherlands	10–5	Italy	Aspire Dome, Doha; Referees: Boris Margeta (SLO), György Kun (HUN)
14 February 2024; 14:30	Report	Score by quarters: 5–1, 2–3, 1–1, 2–0			Aspire Dome, Doha; Referees: Boris Margeta (SLO), György Kun (HUN)
14 February 2024; 14:30	Report	L. Rogge, van de Kraats 3	Goals	Giustini 2	Aspire Dome, Doha; Referees: Boris Margeta (SLO), György Kun (HUN)

Seventh place game

16 February 2024; 10:00	Report	Canada	12–18	Italy	Aspire Dome, Doha; Referees: Boris Margeta (SLO), Darren Spiritosanto (USA)
16 February 2024; 10:00	Report	Score by quarters: 4–5, 4–6, 1–2, 3–5			Aspire Dome, Doha; Referees: Boris Margeta (SLO), Darren Spiritosanto (USA)
16 February 2024; 10:00	Report	Bakoc 4	Goals	Bianconi 5	Aspire Dome, Doha; Referees: Boris Margeta (SLO), Darren Spiritosanto (USA)
