= Artistic swimming at the 2022 World Aquatics Championships – Team free routine =

Team free routine at the 2022 World Aquatics Championships
- Venue: Szechy Pool
- Location: Budapest, Hungary
- Dates: 22 June (preliminary); 24 June (final)
- Competitors: 164 from 21 nations
- Teams: 21
- Winning points: 96.7000

Medalists
gold medal	Chang Hao; Feng Yu; Wang Ciyue; Wang Liuyi; Wang Qianyi; Xiang Binxuan; Xiao Yanning; Zhang Yayi	China
silver medal	Maryna Aleksiiva; Vladyslava Aleksiiva; Olesia Derevianchenko; Marta Fiedina; Veronika Hryshko; Sofiia Matsiievska; Anhelina Ovchynnikova; Valeriya Tyshchenko	Ukraine
bronze medal	Moka Fujii; Moe Higa; Moeka Kijima; Tomoka Sato; Hikari Suzuki; Akane Yanagisawa; Mashiro Yasunaga; Megumu Yoshida	Japan

The Team free routine competition at the 2022 World Aquatics Championships will be held on 22 and 24 June 2022.

== Results ==
The preliminary round was started on 22 June at 10:00. The final was held on 24 June at 16:00.

Rank	Nation	Preliminary		Final	
Rank	Nation	Points	Rank	Points	Rank
1st place, gold medalist(s)	China	95.8000	1	96.7000	1
2nd place, silver medalist(s)	Ukraine	94.3667	2	95.0000	2
3rd place, bronze medalist(s)	Japan	92.7667	3	93.1333	3
4	Spain	91.4333	4	92.0000	4
5	Italy	91.2667	5	91.9000	5
6	France	89.1000	6	90.2667	6
7	Mexico	87.5333	9	88.9667	7
8	Greece	88.4000	7	88.1667	8
9	United States	88.3000	8	87.4667	9
10	Israel	85.0000	10	85.5667	10
11	Kazakhstan	82.5000	11	83.1667	11
12	Great Britain	82.3667	12	82.8000	12
13	Switzerland	81.0333	13	did not advance	
14	Brazil	78.8333	14	did not advance	
15	Egypt	77.4333	15	did not advance	
16	Singapore	75.4333	16	did not advance	
17	Slovakia	75.0333	17	did not advance	
18	Turkey	69.8667	18	did not advance	
19	Thailand	68.5333	19	did not advance	
20	New Zealand	67.6000	20	did not advance	
	Canada	did not start			
