= Artistic swimming at the 2024 World Aquatics Championships – Women's solo technical routine =

Women's solo technical routine at the 2024 World Aquatics Championships
- Venue: Aspire Dome
- Location: Doha, Qatar
- Dates: 2 February (preliminary); 3 February (final)
- Competitors: 28 from 28 nations
- Winning points: 272.9633

Medalists
gold medal	Evangelia Platanioti	Greece
silver medal	Jacqueline Simoneau	Canada
bronze medal	Xu Huiyan	China

The Women's solo technical routine competition at the 2024 World Aquatics Championships was held on 2 and 3 February 2024.

== Results ==
The preliminary round was started on 2 February at 09:30. The final was held on 3 February at 14:00.

Green denotes finalists

Rank	Swimmer	Nationality	Preliminary		Final	
Rank	Swimmer	Nationality	Points	Rank	Points	Rank
1st place, gold medalist(s)	Evangelia Platanioti	Greece	270.1901	1	272.9633	1
2nd place, silver medalist(s)	Jacqueline Simoneau	Canada	260.7500	3	269.2767	2
3rd place, bronze medalist(s)	Xu Huiyan	China	258.2067	4	262.3700	3
4	Vasilina Khandoshka	Neutral Independent Athletes	253.1917	5	261.7466	4
5	Klara Bleyer	Germany	231.8401	9	237.1333	5
6	Vasiliki Alexandri	Austria	264.5967	2	234.4984	6
7	Kyra Hoevertsz	Aruba	221.3450	11	227.1683	7
8	Mari Alavidze	Georgia	233.5017	7	216.7634	8
9	Susanna Pedotti	Italy	238.2967	6	215.0833	9
10	Marloes Steenbeek	Netherlands	231.9267	8	210.9300	10
11	Mónica Arango	Colombia	230.6650	10	201.3300	11
12	Karina Magrupova	Kazakhstan	219.8800	12	199.9433	12
13	Jasmine Verbena	San Marino	217.9267	13	Did not advance	
14	Viktória Reichová	Slovakia	216.1600	14	Did not advance	
15	Ece Üngör	Turkey	212.4533	15	Did not advance	
16	Jullia Catharino	Brazil	209.1350	16	Did not advance	
17	Sandra Freund	Sweden	207.4601	17	Did not advance	
18	Nadine Barsoum	Egypt	203.3500	18	Did not advance	
19	Ana Culic	Malta	189.7283	19	Did not advance	
20	Patrawee Chayawararak	Thailand	188.1168	20	Did not advance	
21	Jennifer Russanov	New Zealand	187.1066	21	Did not advance	
22	Grecia Mendoza	El Salvador	175.0434	22	Did not advance	
23	Gabriela Alpajón	Cuba	173.6300	23	Did not advance	
24	María Alfaro	Costa Rica	167.3550	24	Did not advance	
25	Pinja Kekki	Finland	160.7867	25	Did not advance	
26	Jennah Hafsi	Morocco	155.9850	26	Did not advance	
27	Hilda Tri Julyandra	Indonesia	152.0934	27	Did not advance	
28	Alexandra Mansaré-Traoré	Guinea	129.1199	28	Did not advance	
