= Oleksandra Goretska =

Ukrainian synchronised swimmer

Personal information
- Nationality: Ukrainian
- Born: 19 August 2008 (age 17) Kyiv, Ukraine

Sport
- Sport: Swimming
- Strokes: Artistic swimming
Medal record
Women's artistic swimming
Representing Ukraine
Event	1st	2nd	3rd
World Championships	0	1	0
European Artistic Swimming Championships	0	2	0
Total	0	3	0
World Championships
Silver medal – second place	2024 Doha	Team acrobatic routine
European Artistic Swimming Championships
Silver medal – second place	2025 Funchal	Team acrobatic routine
Silver medal – second place	2025 Funchal	Team technical routine

Oleksandra Goretska (Ukrainian: Горецька Олександра Сергіївна; born 19 August 2008 in Kyiv, Ukraine) is a Ukrainian synchronised swimmer. She is a silver medalist of the 2024 World Aquatics Championships in the team acrobatic routine event. She competed at the 2023 European Junior Artistic Swimming Championships in the team acrobatic routine without receiving a medal (4th place).
