= Artistic swimming at the 2026 Asian Games – Women's duet =

Women's duet at the 2026 Asian Games
- Venue: Hamamatsu Swimming Center
- Date: 26–27 September 2026
- Competitors: 14 from 7 nations

Medalists
gold medal	China; Lin Yanjun; Xu Huiyan
silver medal	Japan; Moe Higa; Tomoka Sato
bronze medal	Kazakhstan; Nargiza Bolatova; Yasmin Tuyakova

The women's duet event at the 2026 Asian Games took place from 26 to 27 September 2026 at Hamamatsu Swimming Center.

== Schedule ==
All times are Japan Standard Time (UTC+09:00)

Date	Time	Event
Saturday, 26 September 2026	11:00	Technical routine
Sunday, 27 September 2026	11:00	Free routine

== Results ==
Rank	Team	Technical	Free	Total
1st place, gold medalist(s)	China (CHN); Lin Yanjun; Xu Huiyan	317.5108	322.8468	640.3576
2nd place, silver medalist(s)	Japan (JPN); Moe Higa; Tomoka Sato	309.8432	291.7134	601.5566
3rd place, bronze medalist(s)	Kazakhstan (KAZ); Nargiza Bolatova; Yasmin Tuyakova	279.6500	286.0826	565.7326
4	Uzbekistan (UZB); Anastasiya Bakhtyreva; Violetta Evenko	289.1675	270.5893	559.7568
5	South Korea (KOR); Hur Yoon-seo; Kim Ji-yoon	258.6234	245.9430	504.5664
6	Hong Kong (HKG); Katherine Chu; Hung Sze Ching	227.4893	204.2733	431.7626
7	Thailand (THA); Patrawee Chayawararak; Getsarin Sawangarom	221.7158	202.2504	423.9662
