= Artistic swimming at the 2026 Asian Games – Team =

Mixed team at the 2026 Asian Games
- Venue: Hamamatsu Swimming Center
- Date: 26–28 September 2026
- Competitors: 50 from 5 nations

Medalists
gold medal	China; Chang Hao; Lin Yanhan; Lin Yanjun; Li Xiuchen; Zhang Xiaoyou; Xu Huiyan; Zhang Yayi; Xiang Binxuan; Dai Shiyi; Guo Muye
silver medal	Japan; Mitsuhashi Risako; Ishii Konatsu; Shirahase Nao; Aitaka Kaho; Kawase Yuka; Kobayashi Uta; Ayano Shimada; Moka Fujii; Moe Higa; Tomoka Sato
bronze medal	Kazakhstan; Nargiza Bolatova; Viktor Druzin; Aigerim Kurmangaliyeva; Karina Magrupova; Xeniya Makarova; Anna Pavletsova; Valeriya Stolbunova; Yasmin Tuyakova; Dayana Jamanchalova; Zhaklin Yakimova

The mixed team event at the 2026 Asian Games took place from 26 to 28 September 2026 at Hamamatsu Swimming Center.

== Schedule ==
All times are Japan Standard Time (UTC+09:00)

Date	Time	Event
Saturday, 26 September 2026	17:00	Acrobatic routine
Sunday, 27 September 2026	17:00	Technical routine
Monday, 28 September 2026	11:00	Free routine

== Results ==
Legend

- A — Competed in acrobatic routine
- T — Competed in technical routine
- T/F — Competed in technical and free routines
- A/F — Competed in acrobatic and free routines
- A/T — Competed in acrobatic and technical routines

Rank	Team	Acrobatic	Technical	Free	Total
1st place, gold medalist(s)	China (CHN); Chang Hao (A); Lin Yanhan; Lin Yanjun; Li Xiuchen (T/F); Zhang Xiaoyou (T/F); Xu Huiyan; Zhang Yayi (A); Xiang Binxuan; Dai Shiyi; Guo Muye	246.0977	312.1990	299.2117	857.5084
2nd place, silver medalist(s)	Japan (JPN); Mitsuhashi Risako; Ishii Konatsu (A/F); Shirahase Nao (A/T); Aitaka Kaho; Kawase Yuka (T/F); Kobayashi Uta; Ayano Shimada; Moka Fujii; Moe Higa; Tomoka Sato	234.5992	300.8724	286.2688	821.7404
3rd place, bronze medalist(s)	Kazakhstan (KAZ); Nargiza Bolatova (A); Viktor Druzin (A/F); Aigerim Kurmangaliyeva; Karina Magrupova; Xeniya Makarova; Anna Pavletsova; Valeriya Stolbunova; Yasmin Tuyakova (T); Dayana Jamanchalova (T/F); Zhaklin Yakimova	191.2626	264.5442	216.7961	672.6029
4	Hong Kong (HKG); Anna Brontie Chan; Jasmine Cheng; Katherine Chu; Hung Sze Ching; Azland Chi Yeung Lam (T/F); Lauren Lam; Lee Chi Yin (A/F); Wong Wing Ka; Yang Zihua; Meyako Zhao (A/T)	169.3926	206.6814	172.3026	548.3766
5	Thailand (THA); Chanathan Pariyanupat; Nichapat Wongsto; Patrawee Chayawararak (T/F); Thunyaporn Homnan (T/F); Napatcha Varasai (A/F); Brazil Na-songkhla; Natnicha Rungtananukorn (A); Sasipa Kijkanokudomdesh; Getsarin Sawangarom; Pimyada Sinsuppharoek (A/T)	152.8570	206.0995	158.5823	517.5388
