= Artistic swimming at the 2022 European Aquatics Championships – Highlights routine =

Highlights routine at the 2022 European Aquatics Championships
- Venue: Foro Italico
- Dates: 12 August
- Competitors: 40 from 4 nations
- Winning points: 94.0667

Medalists
gold medal	Maryna Aleksiiva; Vladyslava Aleksiiva; Olesia Derevianchenko; Marta Fiedina; Veronika Hryshko; Sofiia Matsiievska; Daria Moshynska; Anhelina Ovchynnikova; Anastasiia Shmonina; Valeriya Tyshchenko	Ukraine
silver medal	Domiziana Cavanna; Linda Cerruti; Costanza Di Camillo; Costanza Ferro; Gemma Galli; Marta Iacoacci; Marta Murru; Enrica Piccoli; Federica Sala; Francesca Zunino	Italy
bronze medal	Camille Bravard; Manon Disbeaux; Ambre Esnault; Laura Gonzalez; Mayssa Guermoud; Maureen Jenkins; Romane Lunel; Eve Planeix; Charlotte Tremble; Mathilde Vigneres	France

The Highlights routine competition of the 2022 European Aquatics Championships was held on 12 August 2022.

== Results ==
The event was held on 12 August at 17:00.

Rank	Nation	Swimmers	Points
1st place, gold medalist(s)	Ukraine	Maryna Aleksiiva; Vladyslava Aleksiiva; Olesia Derevianchenko; Marta Fiedina; Veronika Hryshko; Sofiia Matsiievska; Daria Moshynska; Anhelina Ovchynnikova; Anastasiia Shmonina; Valeriya Tyshchenko	94.0667
2nd place, silver medalist(s)	Italy	Domiziana Cavanna; Linda Cerruti; Costanza Di Camillo; Costanza Ferro; Gemma Galli; Marta Iacoacci; Marta Murru; Enrica Piccoli; Federica Sala; Francesca Zunino	91.7000
3rd place, bronze medalist(s)	France	Camille Bravard; Manon Disbeaux; Ambre Esnault; Laura Gonzalez; Mayssa Guermoud; Maureen Jenkins; Romane Lunel; Eve Planeix; Charlotte Tremble; Mathilde Vigneres	89.2000
4	Hungary	Anna Apáthy; Niké Barta; Linda Farkas; Boglárka Gács; Lilien Götz; Hanna Hatala; Szabina Hungler; Cintia Makai; Léna Szórát; Blanka Taksonyi	78.5667
