= Xiang Binxuan =

Chinese synchronised swimmer (born 2001)

Personal information
- National team: China
- Born: 16 November 2001 (age 24)

Sport
- Sport: Swimming
- Strokes: Synchronised swimming
Medal record
Women's synchronised swimming
Representing China
Olympic Games
Gold medal – first place	2024 Paris	Team
World Championships
Gold medal – first place	2022 Budapest	Team technical routine
Gold medal – first place	2022 Budapest	Team free routine
Gold medal – first place	2023 Fukuoka	Team acrobatic routine
Gold medal – first place	2023 Fukuoka	Team free routine
Gold medal – first place	2024 Doha	Team acrobatic routine
Gold medal – first place	2024 Doha	Team technical routine
Gold medal – first place	2024 Doha	Team free routine
Gold medal – first place	2025 Singapore	Team free routine
Gold medal – first place	2025 Singapore	Team technical routine
Gold medal – first place	2025 Singapore	Team acrobatic routine
Asian Games
Gold medal – first place	2022 Hangzhou	Women's team
Gold medal – first place	2026 Aichi–Nagoya	Team routine

Xiang Binxuan (Chinese: 向玢璇, born 16 November 2001) is a Chinese synchronised swimmer.

== Career ==
In June 2022, at the World Aquatics Championships in Budapest, Xiang was part of the Chinese team that won gold in both the technical and free routines. In July 2023, at the World Championships in Fukuoka, she was part of the Chinese team that won gold in both the team free routine and the team acrobatic routine. In October 2023, at the delayed 2022 Asian Games in Hangzhou, she was part of China's team that won gold in the team competition.

In February 2024 at the World Championships in Doha, Xiang was part of the Chinese team that won gold in the acrobatic, free and technical team routines. At the 2024 Summer Olympics in Paris, she was part of China's team that won gold in the team event.
