= Feng Yu (synchronized swimmer) =

Chinese synchronised swimmer (born 1999)

Personal information
- National team: China
- Born: 30 September 1999 (age 27) Beijing, China

Sport
- Sport: Swimming
- Strokes: Synchronised swimming
Medal record
Women's synchronised swimming
Representing China
Olympic Games
| Gold medal – first place | 2024 Paris | Team |
| Silver medal – second place | 2020 Tokyo | Team |
World Championships
| Gold medal – first place | 2017 Budapest | Free routine combination |
| Gold medal – first place | 2022 Budapest | Team technical routine |
| Gold medal – first place | 2022 Budapest | Team free routine |
| Gold medal – first place | 2023 Fukuoka | Team acrobatic routine |
| Gold medal – first place | 2023 Fukuoka | Team free routine |
| Gold medal – first place | 2024 Doha | Team acrobatic routine |
| Gold medal – first place | 2024 Doha | Team technical routine |
| Gold medal – first place | 2024 Doha | Team free routine |
| Gold medal – first place | 2025 Singapore | Team free routine |
| Gold medal – first place | 2025 Singapore | Team technical routine |
| Gold medal – first place | 2025 Singapore | Team acrobatic routine |
| Silver medal – second place | 2017 Budapest | Team technical routine |
| Silver medal – second place | 2017 Budapest | Team free routine |
| Silver medal – second place | 2019 Gwangju | Team technical routine |
| Silver medal – second place | 2019 Gwangju | Team free routine |
| Silver medal – second place | 2019 Gwangju | Free routine combination |
Asian Games
| Gold medal – first place | 2018 Jakarta-Palembang | Team routine |
| Gold medal – first place | 2022 Hangzhou | Team routine |
Asian Swimming Championships
| Silver medal – second place | 2016 Tokyo | Duet free routine |
| Silver medal – second place | 2016 Tokyo | Team technical routine |
| Silver medal – second place | 2016 Tokyo | Team free routine |
| Silver medal – second place | 2016 Tokyo | Free routine combination |
| Silver medal – second place | 2016 Tokyo | Team Highlights |

Feng Yu (Chinese: 冯雨, born 30 September 1999) is a Chinese synchronised swimmer. She won a gold medal (China's first ever) and two silver medals at the 2017 World Aquatics Championships. She also won four silver medals at the 2016 Asian Swimming Championships.

Olympic Games
| Preceded by Zhu Ting & Zhao Shuai | Flagbearer for China (with Ma Long); Paris 2024 | Succeeded by Incumbent |
