= Water polo at the 2024 World Aquatics Championships =

- Host city: Doha, Qatar
- Date: 4–17 February
- Venue: Aspire Dome
- Events: 2

Two water polo competitions took place as part of the 2024 World Aquatics Championships between 4 and 17 February 2024 at the Aspire Dome in Doha, Qatar.

== Qualification ==
A total of 16 teams qualified for each tournament.

=== Men ===
As of 2025, this was the last time France, Kazakhstan qualified and the last time Canada and Singapore failed to qualify.

Event	Dates	Hosts	Quota	Qualifier(s)
2023 World Cup	8 March – 2 July 2023	(United States) Los Angeles	2	Spain; Italy
2023 World Championships	17–29 July 2023	(Japan) Fukuoka	4	Hungary; Greece; Serbia; France
2022 Asian Games	2–7 October 2023	(China) Hangzhou	3	Japan; China; Kazakhstan
2023 Pan American Games	30 October – 4 November 2023	(Chile) Santiago	2	United States; Brazil
2024 European Championship	4–16 January 2024	(Croatia) Dubrovnik/Zagreb	3	Croatia; Montenegro; Romania
African selection	—N/a	—N/a	1	South Africa
Oceanian selection	—N/a	—N/a	1	Australia
Total			16	

=== Women ===
Event	Dates	Hosts	Quota	Qualifier(s)
2023 World Cup	11 April – 25 June 2023	(United States) Long Beach	2	United States; Netherlands
2023 World Championships	16–28 July 2023	(Japan) Fukuoka	4	Spain; Italy; Australia; Hungary
2022 Asian Games	25 September – 1 October 2023	(China) Hangzhou	3	China; ~~Japan~~; Kazakhstan; Singapore
2023 Pan American Games	30 October – 4 November 2023	(Chile) Santiago	2	Canada; Brazil
2024 European Championship	5–13 January 2024	(Netherlands) Eindhoven	3	Greece; France; Great Britain
African selection	—N/a	—N/a	1	South Africa
Oceanian selection	—N/a	—N/a	1	New Zealand
Total			16	

- Due a limited budget Japan was forced to withdraw from tournament and was replaced by Singapore.

== Medalists ==
=== Medal table ===
* Host nation (Qatar)

Rank	Nation	Gold	Silver	Bronze	Total
1	Croatia	1	0	0	1
1	United States	1	0	0	1
3	Hungary	0	1	0	1
3	Italy	0	1	0	1
5	Spain	0	0	2	2
Totals (5 entries)		2	2	2	6

=== Medal summary ===
Event	Gold	Silver	Bronze
Men	Croatia	Italy	Spain
Women	United States	Hungary	Spain
