= Xiao Yanning =

Chinese synchronized swimmer

Personal information
- National team: China
- Born: 23 February 1998 (age 28) Dazhou, Sichuan, China
- Height: 1.67 m (5 ft 6 in)

Sport
- Sport: Swimming
- Strokes: Synchronised swimming
Medal record
Women's synchronised swimming
Representing China
Olympic Games
Gold medal – first place	2024 Paris	Team
Silver medal – second place	2020 Tokyo	Team
World Championships
Gold medal – first place	2017 Budapest	Free routine combination
Gold medal – first place	2022 Budapest	Team technical routine
Gold medal – first place	2022 Budapest	Team free routine
Gold medal – first place	2023 Fukuoka	Team acrobatic routine
Gold medal – first place	2023 Fukuoka	Team free routine
Gold medal – first place	2024 Doha	Team acrobatic routine
Gold medal – first place	2024 Doha	Team technical routine
Gold medal – first place	2024 Doha	Team free routine
Silver medal – second place	2015 Kazan	Free routine combination
Silver medal – second place	2017 Budapest	Team technical routine
Silver medal – second place	2017 Budapest	Team free routine
Silver medal – second place	2019 Gwangju	Team technical routine
Silver medal – second place	2019 Gwangju	Team free routine
Silver medal – second place	2019 Gwangju	Free routine combination
Asian Games
Gold medal – first place	2018 Jakarta	Team routine
Gold medal – first place	2022 Hangzhou	Team routine
Asian Swimming Championships
Silver medal – second place	2016 Tokyo	Duet technical routine
Silver medal – second place	2016 Tokyo	Team technical routine
Silver medal – second place	2016 Tokyo	Team free routine
Silver medal – second place	2016 Tokyo	Free routine combination
Silver medal – second place	2016 Tokyo	Team Highlights

Xiao Yanning (Chinese: 肖雁宁, born 23 February 1998) is a Chinese competitor in synchronised swimming.

She won a silver medal at the 2015 World Aquatics Championships as the youngest athlete on the Chinese team. She also won 2 bronze medals at the 2014 FINA World Junior Synchronised Swimming Championships.
