= Xu Huiyan =

Chinese artistic swimmer (born 2005)

Personal information
- Nationality: Chinese
- Born: 9 October 2005 (age 21)

Sport
- Country: China
- Sport: Synchronised swimming
Medal record
Women's artistic swimming
Representing China
World Championships
| Gold medal – first place | 2025 Singapore | Solo technical |
| Gold medal – first place | 2025 Singapore | Team free |
| Gold medal – first place | 2025 Singapore | Team acrobatic |
| Silver medal – second place | 2025 Singapore | Solo free |
| Bronze medal – third place | 2024 Doha | Solo technical |
World Junior Championships
| Gold medal – first place | 2024 Lima | Solo technical |
| Gold medal – first place | 2024 Lima | Team free |
| Gold medal – first place | 2024 Lima | Team technical |
| Silver medal – second place | 2024 Lima | Duet free |
| Bronze medal – third place | 2024 Lima | Solo free |
Asian Games
| Gold medal – first place | 2026 Aichi–Nagoya | Duet routine |
| Gold medal – first place | 2026 Aichi–Nagoya | Team routine |

Xu Huiyan (Chinese: 徐汇妍, born 9 October 2005) is a Chinese synchronised swimmer.

== Career ==
Xu competed at the 2025 World Aquatics Championships and won a gold medal in the solo technical routine with a score of 272.9917 points, China's first gold medal of the championships. This also marked the first time China has won gold in this event at the World Aquatics Championships. She also won a silver medal in the solo free routine with a score of 241.0025 points. She then helped China win gold medals in the team free and team acrobatic routines.

In September 2026, she competed at the 2026 Asian Games and won gold medals in the duet and team routines.
