= Chang Hao (synchronized swimmer) =

Chinese synchronised swimmer (born 1997)

Personal information
- National team: China
- Born: 28 April 1997 (age 29) Beijing, China

Sport
- Sport: Swimming
- Strokes: Synchronised swimming
Medal record
Women's synchronized swimming
Representing China
Olympic Games
Gold medal – first place	2024 Paris	Team
World Championships
Gold medal – first place	2017 Budapest	Free routine combination
Gold medal – first place	2022 Budapest	Team technical routine
Gold medal – first place	2022 Budapest	Team free routine
Gold medal – first place	2023 Fukuoka	Team acrobatic routine
Gold medal – first place	2023 Fukuoka	Team free routine
Gold medal – first place	2024 Doha	Team acrobatic routine
Gold medal – first place	2024 Doha	Team technical routine
Gold medal – first place	2024 Doha	Team free routine
Gold medal – first place	2025 Singapore	Team free routine
Gold medal – first place	2025 Singapore	Team technical routine
Gold medal – first place	2025 Singapore	Team acrobatic routine
Silver medal – second place	2017 Budapest	Team free routine
Silver medal – second place	2019 Gwangju	Team free routine
Silver medal – second place	2019 Gwangju	Free routine combination
Asian Games
Gold medal – first place	2018 Jakarta–Palembang	Team routine
Gold medal – first place	2022 Hangzhou	Team routine
Gold medal – first place	2026 Aichi–Nagoya	Team routine
Asian Swimming Championships
Silver medal – second place	2016 Tokyo	Team technical routine
Silver medal – second place	2016 Tokyo	Free routine combination
Silver medal – second place	2016 Tokyo	Team Highlights

Chang Hao (Chinese: 常昊, born 28 April 1997) is a Chinese synchronised swimmer. She won a gold medal (China's first ever) and a silver medal at the 2017 World Aquatics Championships. She also won 4 silver medals at the 2016 Asian Swimming Championships.
