= Moe Higa =

Japanese artistic swimmer

Personal information
- Nationality: Japanese
- Born: September 15, 2007 (age 19) Hiroshima, Japan
- Education: Kindai University

Sport
- Sport: Artistic swimming
- Club: Imura Artistic Swimming Club
Medal record
Representing Japan
Artistic swimming
Asian Games
Silver medal – second place	2026 Aichi–Nagoya	Women's duet
Silver medal – second place	2026 Aichi–Nagoya	Team
Silver medal – second place	2023 Hangzhou	Women's duet
Silver medal – second place	2023 Hangzhou	Team acrobatic
World Aquatics Championships
Gold medal – first place	2023 Fukuoka	Women's duet technical
Silver medal – second place	2023 Fukuoka	Team free
Bronze medal – third place	2023 Fukuoka	Women's duet free
Silver medal – second place	2024 Doha	Team free
Bronze medal – third place	2024 Doha	Team technical

Moe Higa (Japanese: 比嘉 もえ; born 15 September 2007) is a Japanese artistic swimming athlete. She represented Japan at the 2024 Summer Olympics in Paris and has won medals at the World Aquatics Championships, the Asian Games and the World Aquatics Artistic Swimming World Cup. Her international achievements include a gold medal in the women's duet technical event at the 2023 World Aquatics Championships and two silver medals at the 2026 Asian Games in Aichi–Nagoya.

== Career ==
Higa was born on 15 September 2007 in Hiroshima, Japan. She attended Shitennoji High School in Osaka and trained with the Imura Artistic Swimming Club. She developed into one of Japan's leading young artistic swimmers and began competing internationally as a teenager. At the 2022 World Aquatics Championships in Budapest, Hungary, she won silver medals in the women's team technical routine and free combination, as well as bronze in the team free routine. She also competed in the junior and youth world championships that year, winning gold medals in solo events.

In 2023, Higa represented Japan at the World Aquatics Championships in Fukuoka, Japan. Competing in the women's duet with Tomoka Sato, she won the gold medal in the technical routine and bronze in the free routine. She also won silver in the team free routine. These results made her one of the youngest Japanese swimmers to achieve multiple medals at a senior world championships. Later that year, she competed at the Asian Games in Hangzhou, China, where she won silver medals in the women's duet and team acrobatic events.

At the 2024 World Aquatics Championships in Doha, Qatar, Higa contributed to Japan's silver-medal finish in the team free routine and bronze-medal finish in the team technical routine. She was subsequently selected for Japan's team at the 2024 Summer Olympics in Paris. At the Games, she competed in both the women's duet and team events. Japan finished eighth in the duet and fifth in the team competition.

In 2025, Higa competed at the World Aquatics Championships in Singapore, where she finished sixth in the women's solo technical routine. She continued to compete in international World Cup events and represented Japan in both solo and team disciplines. Her results included appearances in the women's duet and team routines alongside other members of Japan's national artistic swimming squad.

Higa entered Kindai University in 2026, where she joined the university's athletic programme while continuing to represent Japan internationally. At the Japanese national championships that year, she won the women's solo technical, duet technical and acrobatic routine events. At the World Aquatics Artistic Swimming World Cup Super Final in Toronto, Canada, in June, she earned bronze in the women's solo technical routine and silver in the duet free routine with Sato. She was also part of the Japanese team that won gold in the team free event and silver in the team acrobatic routine.

At the 2026 Asian Games in Aichi and Nagoya, Japan, Higa competed in the women's duet and team events. She won silver medals in both competitions as part of the Japanese national team.
