= Synchronised swimming =

Hybrid form of swimming, dance and gymnastics

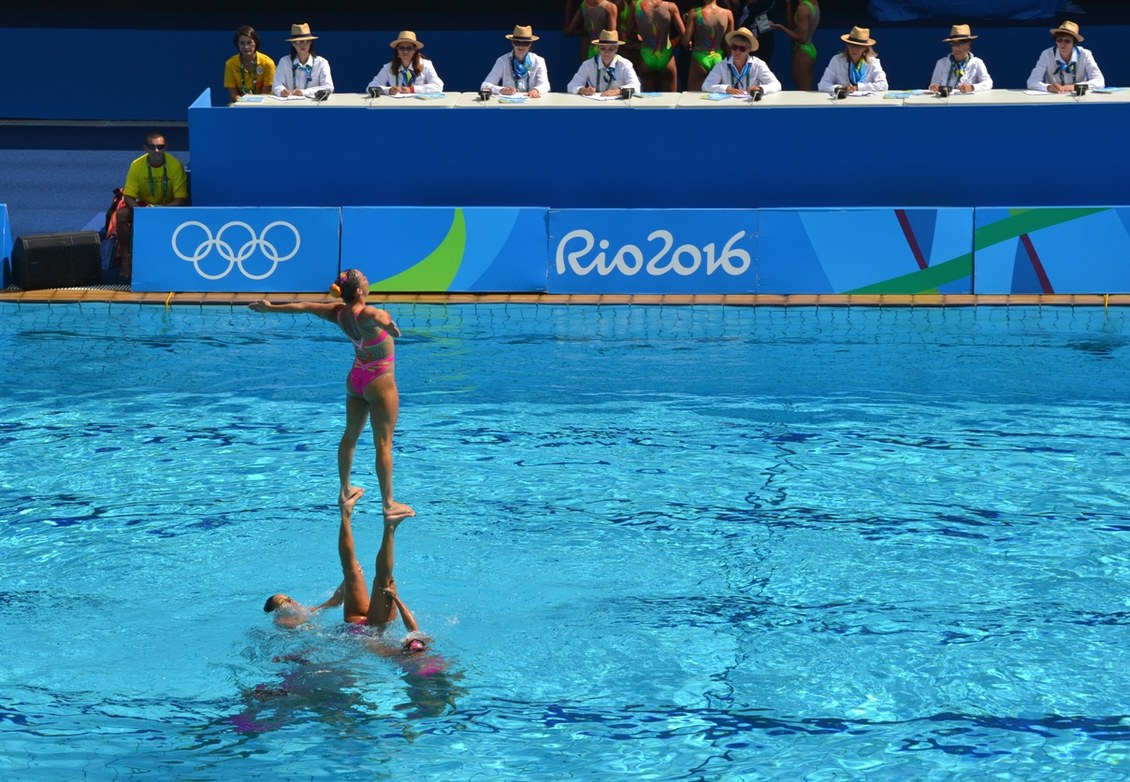
- Brazilian synchronised swimming team performing a free routine combination in 2016
- Highest governing body: World Aquatics (formerly known as FINA)

Characteristics
- Contact: No
- Type: Female; Aquatic sport; Women's duet; Team events
- Venue: Swimming pool

Presence
- Olympic: Yes

Pictogram for artistic swimming at the Summer Olympics

Synchronised swimming (or synchronized swimming), also known as artistic swimming, is a sport where swimmers perform a synchronised choreographed routine, accompanied by music. The sport is governed internationally by World Aquatics (formerly known as FINA). It has traditionally been a women's sport, although FINA introduced a new mixed-gender duet competition that included one male swimmer in each duet at the 2015 World Aquatics Championships and European Aquatics introduced men's individual events at the 2022 European Aquatics Championships. From 2024, men are able to compete in the team event at the Olympics.

Synchronised swimming has been part of the Summer Olympics program since 1984, featuring both women's duet and team events. In 2017, under the instruction of the International Olympic Committee (IOC), FINA renamed the sport from "synchronised swimming" to "artistic swimming" – a decision that has faced controversy. The new official name has yet to gain general acceptance beyond the core of the sport.

In 2022, the synchronised-swimming rules were overhauled to reduce subjectivity in judging. This change brings the sport's rules closer to the sport of artistic gymnastics and also figure skating.

== Routine ==
Routines are composed of elements and transitions. Under World Aquatics rules, they are from two to three minutes long, with competition category determining routine length. There is a penalty for touching the bottom of the pool during the routine. Swimmers are synchronised to each other and to the music. Routines are judged on execution and artistic impression and a pre-determined degree of difficulty. The degree of difficulty is declared prior to performing, and may decrease in the final score if athletes fail to complete the declared movements. Each routine has a coach card, where the elements and their difficulty are declared in order of performance.

=== Elements ===
There are three types of elements: hybrid, acrobatic, and technical required elements. Each category of routine has a certain number of elements which must be performed. Elements have a difficulty score which is declared prior to the routine's performance. If the element is not performed as it is declared, the element will receive a base mark, reducing its difficulty to its base value. A panel of judges scores each element for execution, which is multiplied by the difficulty of the element, making it a significant loss to the routine's score if an element receives a base mark.

==== Hybrids ====
A hybrid is a combination of leg movements, with the head and torso underneath the water. It is defined as five or more movements performed with the head underneath the hips. A hybrid consists of skills, with each skill having a difficulty value determined by World Aquatics. The difficulty of the skills is added to the base value (0.5) to get the declared difficulty. An example of how a hybrid could receive a base mark would be if a skill with a 360 degree spin is declared, but the swimmer doesn't spin the full amount.

==== Acrobatic ====
An acrobatic is a movement where one or more swimmers are lifted out of the water by their teammates. They are also referred to as lifts or highlights.

==== Technical required element (TRE) ====
A technical required element is a predetermined movement that must be performed in a technical routine. They are visually similar to hybrids, but will stay the same across routines in the same category. The required elements vary in different categories, so teams and duets and solos all have different required elements.

=== Technical and free routines ===
Technical routines include technical required elements and are shorter than free routines. They also include free hybrids and acrobatics, but the majority of the elements performed are technical elements. A free routine does not include technical required elements, only hybrids and acrobatics. Free routines allow for more creativity and innovation in choreography. Younger categories of competition will compete in figures competitions, performing predetermined movements outside of a routine, rather than technical routines.

== Acrobatic movements ==
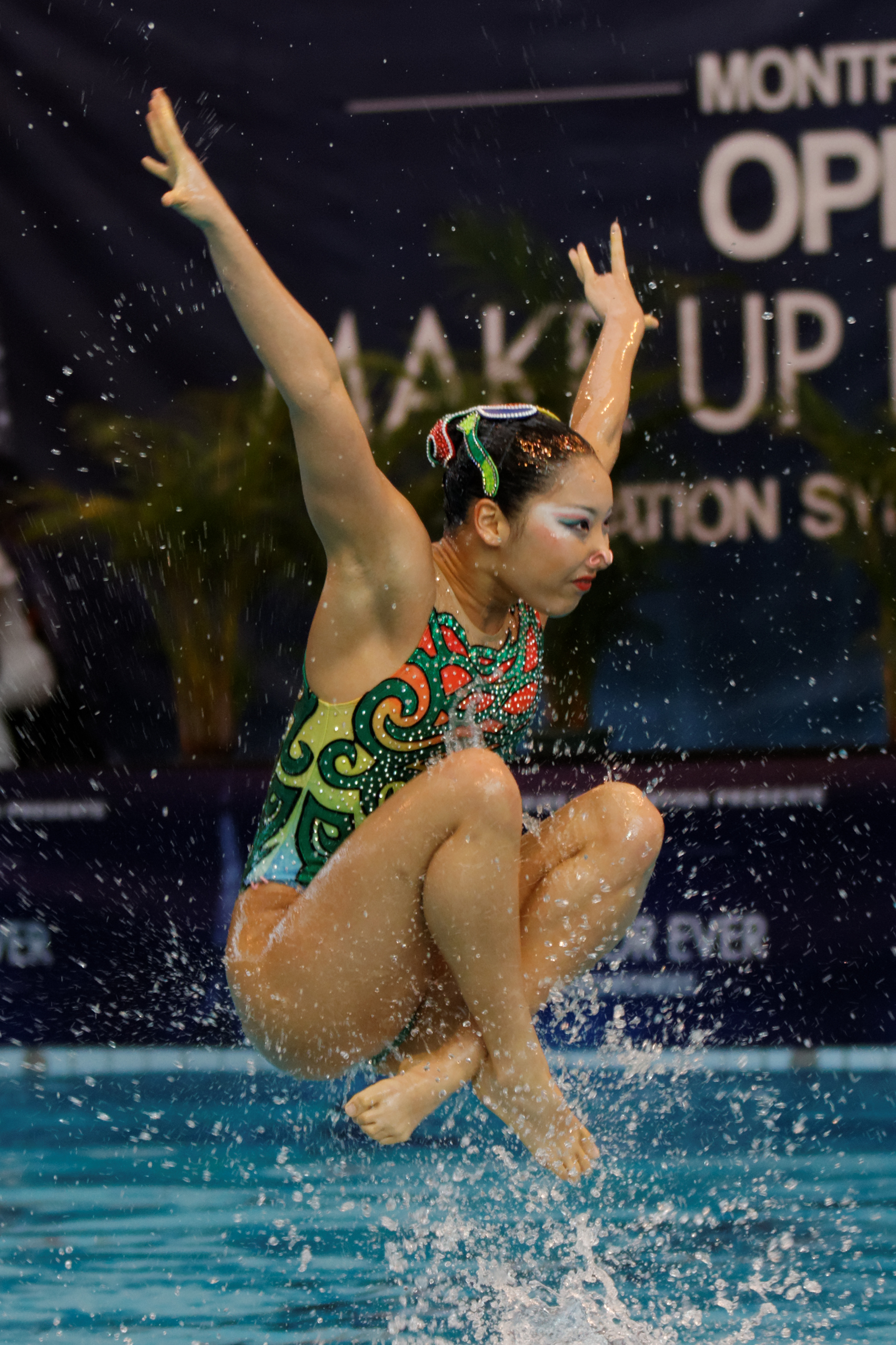
A member of the Japanese team is thrown up in the air during the team's free routine at the 2013 French Open.

An acrobatic movement, also referred to as a lift or highlight, is when an athlete is propelled out of the water with the assistance of other swimmers. Generally, an acrobatic movement is an element in the routine, and has a degree of difficulty. Under the World Aquatics rules, there are four types of acrobatic movement:

- Airborne: featured swimmer is lifted into the air, disconnecting from the support swimmers.
- Balance: featured swimmer balances on a support swimmer, staying connected from exit and entrance into the water.
- Platform: the support swimmers form a stable base or platform that the featured swimmer is lifted on. While this type will not achieve the same height the Balance, the stable base allows the featured swimmer to be lifted out of the water for longer.
- Combined: A combination of any of the above types of acrobatic movement.

=== Construction ===
There are varying techniques used in acrobatics. The featured swimmer, or the flyer, is the athlete who is lifted out of the water to perform poses or acrobatic movements. The featured swimmer will often need gymnastics and diving skills to perform high-difficulty acrobatics. They are supported by swimmers underneath the water who typically use eggbeater to generate the power to lift the flyer out of the water.

== Olympic Games ==
The first Olympic demonstration of synchronised swimming was at the 1952 Olympic Games, where the Helsinki officials welcomed Katherine Curtis and lit a torch in her honour. Curtis died in 1980, but synchronised swimming did not become an official Olympic sport until the 1984 Summer Olympic Games. It was also not until 1968 that synchronised swimming became officially recognised by FINA as the fourth water sport next to swimming, platform diving and water polo.

From 1984 through 1992, the Summer Olympic Games featured solo and duet competitions, but they were both dropped in 1996 in favour of team competition. At the 2000 Olympic Games, however, the duet competition was restored and is now featured alongside the team competition. At the 2024 Olympic Games, men were included in competition for the first time. Additionally, these games included a team acrobatic routine round.

| Event | 1984 | 1988 | 1992 | 1996 | 2000 | 2004 | 2008 | 2012 | 2016 | 2020 | 2024 | 2028 | Years |
|---|---|---|---|---|---|---|---|---|---|---|---|---|---|
| Women's / Open team | | | | ● | ● | ● | ● | ● | ● | ● | ● | ● | 9 |
| Women's duet | ● | ● | ● | | ● | ● | ● | ● | ● | ● | ● | ● | 11 |
| Women's solo | ● | ● | ● | | | | | | | | | | 3 |
| Total Events | 2 | 2 | 2 | 1 | 2 | 2 | 2 | 2 | 2 | 2 | 2 | 2 | |

== World Aquatics Championships ==
Synchronised swimming has been part of the World Aquatics Championships since the beginning. From 1973 through 2001, the World Aquatics Championships featured solo, duet and team competitions. In 2003, a free routine combination, comprising elements of solo, duet and team, was added. In 2005, it was renamed free combination. In 2007, solo, duet and team events were split between technical and free routines. In 2015, the mixed duet (technical and free) were added to the competition program. In 2019, the highlight routine was added into the competition program and it was renamed into acrobatic routine in 2023. Also in 2023, the men's solo (technical and free routines) were added to the competition program.

| Event | 1973 | 1975 | 1978 | 1982 | 1986 | 1991 | 1994 | 1998 | 2001 | 2003 | 2005 | 2007 | 2009 | 2011 | 2013 | 2015 | 2017 | 2019 | 2022 | 2023 | 2024 | 2025 | Years |
|---|---|---|---|---|---|---|---|---|---|---|---|---|---|---|---|---|---|---|---|---|---|---|---|
| Free combination | | | | | | | | | | ● | ● | ● | ● | ● | ● | ● | ● | ● | | | | | 10 |
| Free team | ● | ● | ● | ● | ● | ● | ● | ● | ● | ● | ● | ● | ● | ● | ● | ● | ● | ● | ● | ● | ● | ● | 22 |
| Technical team | | | | | | | | | | | | ● | ● | ● | ● | ● | ● | ● | ● | ● | ● | ● | 11 |
| Women's free duet | ● | ● | ● | ● | ● | ● | ● | ● | ● | ● | ● | ● | ● | ● | ● | ● | ● | ● | ● | ● | ● | ● | 22 |
| Women's technical duet | | | | | | | | | | | | ● | ● | ● | ● | ● | ● | ● | ● | ● | ● | ● | 11 |
| Women's free solo | ● | ● | ● | ● | ● | ● | ● | ● | ● | ● | ● | ● | ● | ● | ● | ● | ● | ● | ● | ● | ● | ● | 22 |
| Women's technical solo | | | | | | | | | | | | ● | ● | ● | ● | ● | ● | ● | ● | ● | ● | ● | 11 |
| Men's free solo | | | | | | | | | | | | | | | | | | | | ● | ● | ● | 3 |
| Men's technical solo | | | | | | | | | | | | | | | | | | | | ● | ● | ● | 3 |
| Mixed free duet | | | | | | | | | | | | | | | | ● | ● | ● | ● | ● | ● | ● | 7 |
| Mixed technical duet | | | | | | | | | | | | | | | | ● | ● | ● | ● | ● | ● | ● | 7 |
| Highlight / Acrobatic | | | | | | | | | | | | | | | | | | ● | ● | ● | ● | ● | 5 |
| Total Events | 3 | 3 | 3 | 3 | 3 | 3 | 3 | 3 | 3 | 4 | 4 | 7 | 7 | 7 | 7 | 9 | 9 | 10 | 10 | 11 | 11 | 11 | |

== European Aquatics Championships ==
Artistic swimming is part of the program of the European Aquatics Championships from 1974. A stand alone European Aquatics Artistic Swimming Championships was incorporated into the 2023 European Games, for the first time taking place outside the larger European Aquatics Championships.

== Basic skills ==
=== Sculls ===
Sculls (hand movements used to propel the body) are some of the most essential skills in synchronised swimming. Commonly used sculls include support scull, stationary scull, propeller scull, alligator scull, torpedo scull, split scull, barrel scull, spinning scull, totem scull, canoe scull and paddle scull. The support scull is used most often to support the body while a swimmer is performing upside down.

=== Eggbeater ===
The "eggbeater kick" is another important skill of synchronised swimming. It is a form of treading water that allows for stability and height above the water while leaving the hands free to perform arm motions. An average eggbeater height is usually around collarbone level. Eggbeater is used in all "arm" sections, a piece of choreography in which the swimmer is upright, often with one or both arms in the air. Another variation is a body boost, which is executed through an eggbeater buildup and a strong whip kick, propelling the swimmer out of the water vertically. A body boost can raise a swimmer out of the water to hip level

== Positions ==
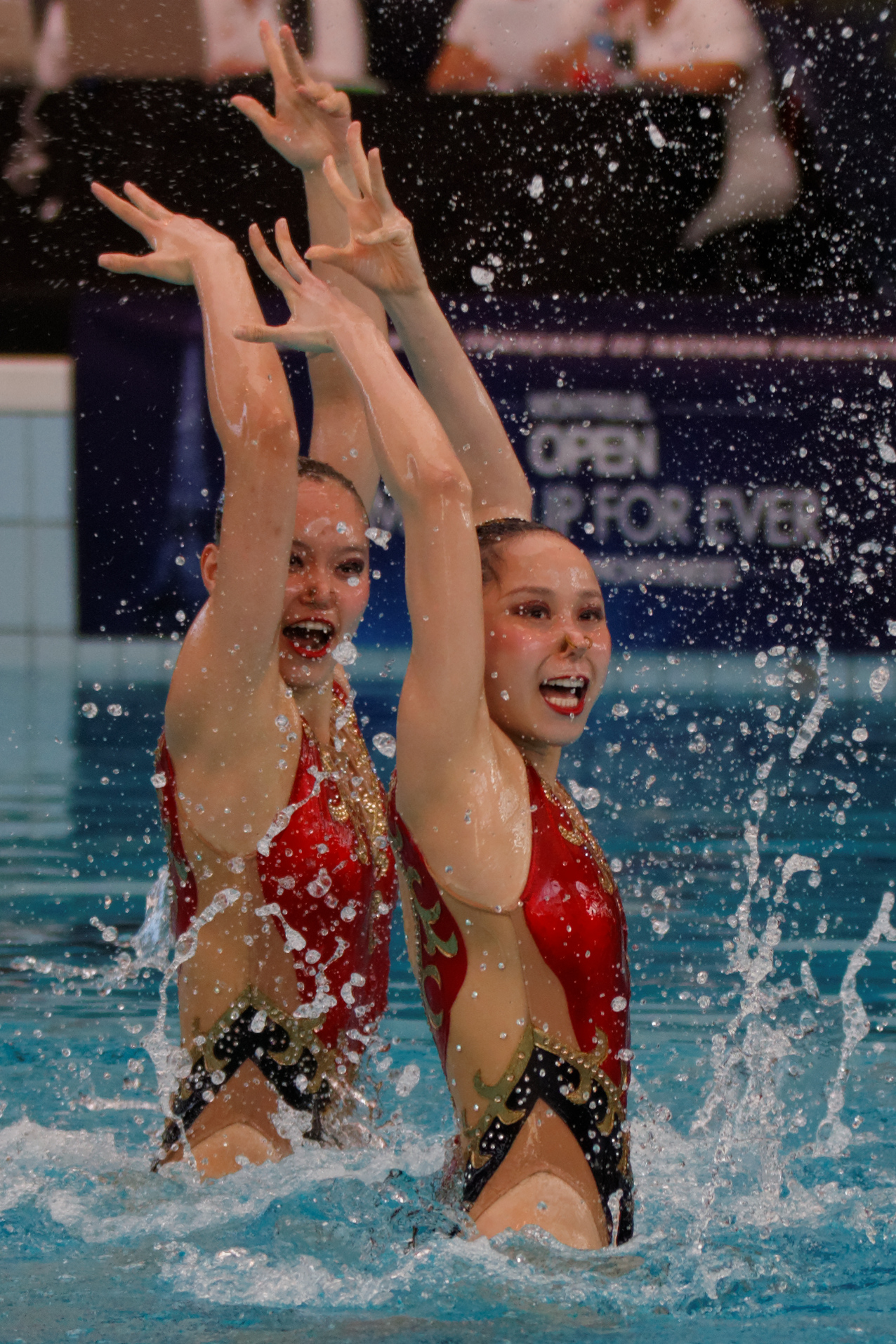
Wu Yiwen and Huang Xuechen of China perform during the duet technical routine at the 2013 French Open.

There are hundreds of different regular positions that can be used to create seemingly infinite combinations. These are a few basic and commonly used ones:

- Back Layout: The most basic position. The body floats, completely straight and rigid, face-up on the surface while sculling under the hips.
- Back Tuck Somersault: Start in a back layout position. Bring your legs into your chest and pivot yourself backwards doing a full rotation or 360. From the tuck position, extend your legs and finish in a back layout position.
- Ballet Leg: Beginning in a back layout, one leg is extended and held perpendicular to the body, while the other is held parallel to the surface of the water.
- Bent Knee (or Heron): While holding a vertical body position, one leg remains vertical while the other leg bends so that its toe is touching the knee of the vertical leg.
- Crane (or Fishtail): While holding a vertical body position, one leg remains vertical while the other is dropped parallel to the surface, making a 90-degree angle or "L" shape. More specifically, a crane position requires the 90-degree angle in the legs (even if the bottom leg is submerged), while a fishtail requires the bottom foot to be at the surface which may or may not create a 90-degree angle in the legs depending on height.
- Double Ballet Leg: Similar to ballet leg position where both legs are extended and held perpendicular to the body.
- Flamingo: Similar to ballet leg position where bottom leg is pulled into the chest so that the shin of the bottom leg is touching the knee of the vertical leg, while remaining parallel to the surface of the water.
- Front Layout: Much like a Back Layout, the only difference is that the swimmer is on his/her stomach, sculling by his/her chest, and not breathing.
- Front Walkover: Begin in a front layout position. Scull downwards into a pike position. Lift one leg vertically into a crane position. Lower that same leg into a split position. Lift the remaining leg vertically into a knight position. Lower the remaining leg and scull above your head into a back layout position.
- Knight: The body is in a surface arch position, where the legs are flat on the surface, and the body is arched so that the head is vertically in line with the hips. One leg is lifted, creating a vertical line perpendicular to the surface.
- Side Fishtail: Side fishtail is a position which one leg remains vertical, while the other is extended out to the side parallel to the water, creating a side "Y" position.
- Split Position: With the body vertical, one leg is stretched forward along the surface and the other extended back along the surface, in an upside down split position.
- Tower: Start in a front layout position. Scull downwards into a pike position. Lift one leg vertically into a crane position. Lift the other leg into a vertical position and descend into the water.
- Tub: Both legs are pulled up to the chest with the shins and tops of the feet dry and parallel on the surface of the water.
- Vertical: Achieved by holding the body completely straight upside down and perpendicular to the surface usually with both legs entirely out of water.

The International Olympic Committee has further described the technical positions.

== Competitions ==
Competitors wear a noseclip to keep water from entering their nose when submerged. While competing, hair is typically worn in a bun and gelatin is applied to keep the hair in place. Rarely, swimmers compete with custom-made swimming caps in place of their hair in buns.

Competitors wear custom swimsuits, usually elaborately decorated with bright fabric and sequins to reflect the music to which they are swimming. Headpieces are part of the costume, and attached to the bun. Athletes are not permitted to wear goggles during competition. Athletes will normally compete wearing make-up.

Underwater speakers ensure that swimmers can hear the music and synchronise with each other.

=== Figures ===
A figure is a combination of body movements, similar to a technical required element. They are performed outside of a routine, and without music accompaniment, in front of a panel of judges. Figures are competed by younger swimmers, generally under the age of sixteen, instead of the technical routine. The scores of the figures competition will contribute to the free routine scores. The origin of figures in the sport comes from compulsory figures in figure skating.

=== United States ===
In the United States, competitors are divided into groups by age. The eight age groups are: 12 and under, 13–15, 16–17, 18–19, Junior (elite 15–18), Senior (elite 15+), Collegiate, and Master. In addition to these groups, younger swimmers may be divided by ability into three levels: Novice, Intermediate, and age group. Certain competitions require the athlete(s) to pass a certain Grade Level. Grades as of now range from Level one to Level six, and will soon go to Level ten. Seasons range in length, and some swimmers participate year-round in competitions. There are many levels of competition, including but not limited to: State, Regional, Zone, National, Junior Olympic, and US Junior and Senior Opens. Each swimmer may compete in the following routine events: solo, duet, combo (consisting of ten swimmers), and team (consisting of eight swimmers). In the 12 & under and 13-15 age groups, figure scores are combined with routines to determine the final rankings. The 16-17 and 18-19 age groups combine the scores of the technical and free routines to determine the final rankings. USA Synchro's annual intercollegiate championships have been dominated by The Ohio State University, Stanford University, Lindenwood University (which no longer has a collegiate program), and The University of the Incarnate Word.

=== Canada ===
In Canada, as of 2010, synchronised swimming has an age-based structure system with age groups 10 & under, 12 & under, and 13–15 for the provincial levels. There is also a skill level which is 13–15 and juniors (16–18) known as national stream, as well as competition at the Masters and University levels. The 13–15 age group and 16–18 age group are national stream athletes that align with international age groups – 15 and Under and Junior (16–18) and Senior (18+) level athletes. Wildrose age group is for competitors before they reach 13–15 national stream. Wildrose ranges from Tier 8 and under 16 and over provincial/wildrose. These are also competitive levels. Recreational levels, called "stars", also exist. Synchro Canada requires that a competitor must pass Star 3 before entering Tier 1. To get into a Tier a swimmer must take a test for that Tier. In these tests, the swimmer must be able to perform the required movements for the level. (Canada no longer uses Tiers as a form of level placement). The Canadian University synchronised swimming League (CUASL) is intended for Canadian Swimmers who wish to continue their participation in the sport during their university studies, as well as offering a "Novice" category for those new to the sport. Traditionally, the top teams hail from McGill University, the University of Ottawa, and the University of British Columbia.

=== Men's and mixed competition ===
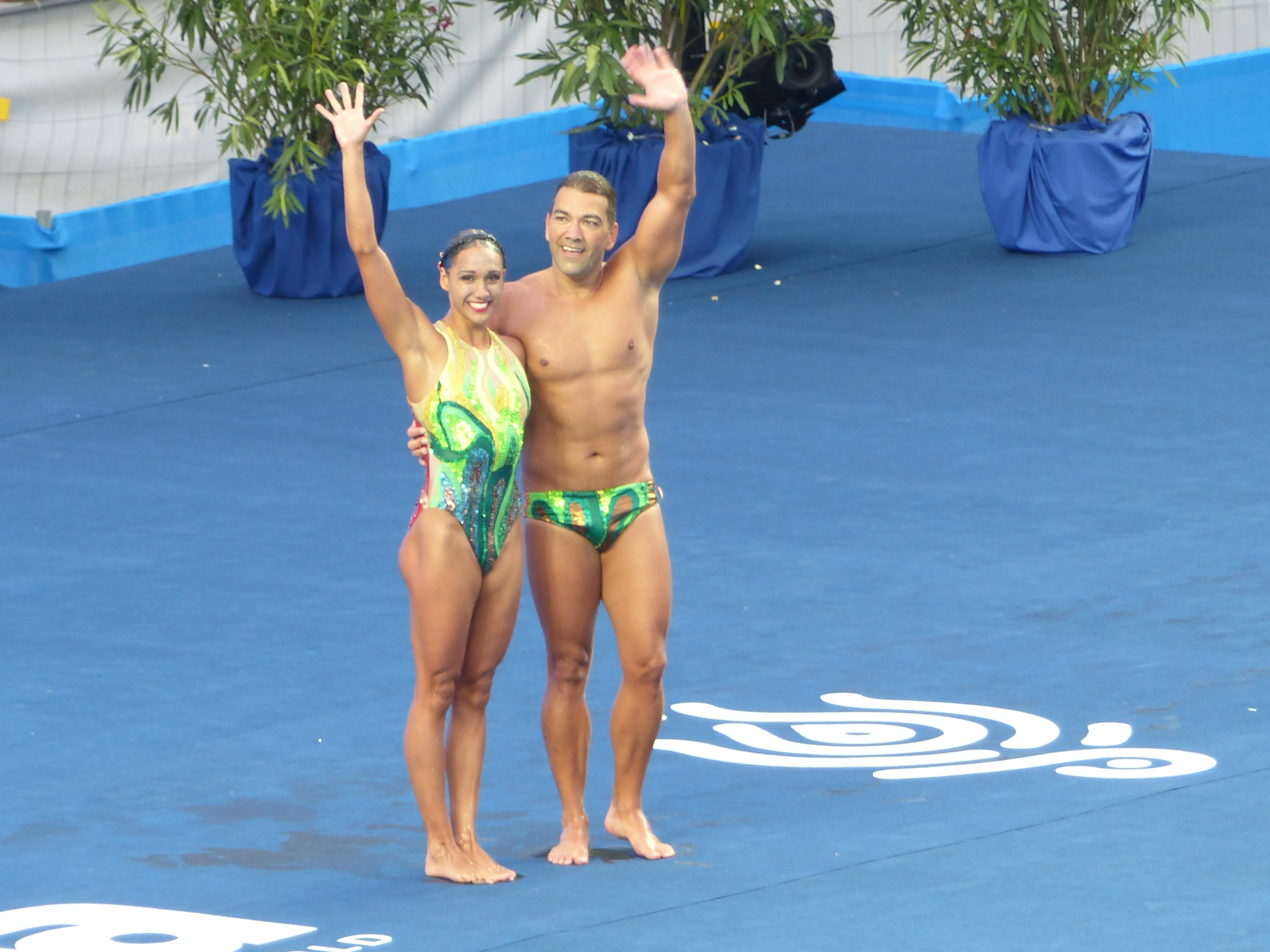
A mixed-sex pair, participating in FINA World Championships of synchronised swimming, waves to the crowd before diving into water.

Some international, national and regional competitions allow men to compete, and the Fédération internationale de natation (FINA) introduced a new mixed duet competition at the 2015 World Aquatics Championships.

In the late 19th century, synchronised swimming was a male-only event. However, in the 20th century it became a women's sport, with men banned from many competitions. In the U.S., men were allowed to participate with women until 1941, when synchronised swimming became part of the Amateur Athletic Union (AAU). The AAU required men and women to compete separately, which resulted in a decline of male participants. In the 1940s and 1950s, Bert Hubbard and Donn Squire were among the top US male competitors.

In 1978, the U.S. changed their rules to allow men to once again compete with women. Rules in other countries varied; in the UK, men were prohibited from competing until 2014, while in France, Benoît Beaufils was allowed to compete at national events in the 1990s. American Bill May was a top competitor in the late-1990s and early-2000s. He medalled in several international events, including the 1998 Goodwill Games. However, male competitors were barred from top competitions, including the World Aquatics Championships and the Olympics. However, at the 2015 World Aquatics Championships, FINA introduced a new mixed duet discipline. Both May and Beaufils returned from decade-long retirements to represent their countries. Among their competitors were Russian Aleksandr Maltsev and Italian Giorgio Minisini, both over 15 years younger than May and Beaufils. Pairs from ten countries competed in the inaugural events. The 2016 European Aquatics Championships was the first time men were allowed to compete at the European Championships. While men are allowed in more events, they were still barred from competing in the 2016 Summer Olympics. FINA did propose adding the mixed duet competition to the 2020 Summer Olympics.

In 2022, FINA allowed men to compete as soloists at the 2022 FINA Artistic Swimming World Series and the 2022 FINA World Junior Artistic Swimming Championships and LEN allowed men to compete as soloists both at the European Junior Championships and the 2022 European Aquatics Championships. The International Olympic Committee allowed for the participation of up to two men per team of eight in a mixed gender team event at the 2024 Olympic Games, competition of men in duet, solo, and men-only team events was not permitted. The mixed team format for the 2024 Olympic Games was adapted from the mixed team format, up to two men allowed per team, used at the 2022 FINA Artistic Swimming World Series (March to May 2022).

Men's solo events debuted at the senior World Championships level at the 2023 World Aquatics Championships with solo technical and solo free routines.

== History ==
At the turn of the 20th century, synchronised swimming was referred to as water ballet. The first recorded synchronised swimming competition took place in 1891 in Berlin, Germany. During this period, many swim clubs were formed, and the sport simultaneously developed in Canada. As well as existing as a sport, it often constituted a popular addition to Music Hall evenings, in the larger variety theatres of London or Glasgow which were equipped with on-stage water tanks for the purpose.

In 1917, Australian Annette Kellerman popularised the sport when she performed in a water ballet at the New York Hippodrome. After experimenting with various diving actions and stunts in the water, Katherine Curtis started one of the first water ballet clubs at the University of Chicago, where the team began executing strokes, "tricks", and floating formations. Curtis is widely credited as the true originator of synchronised swimming; important historical details regarding the origin of the phrase "synchronized swimming", its reference to the Olympic sport, and the technical structure of that sport are all credited to Curtis.

Busby Berkeley created a 15-minute "aquacade" for the 1933 film Footlight Parade, "By a Waterfall". According to TCM.com, "The set, complete with an 80-by-40-foot swimming pool, took up an entire soundstage. Berkeley had the pool lined with glass walls and a glass floor so he could shoot the swimmers from every possible angle. Then he designed the swimming suits and bathing caps to create the illusion that the women were almost naked." It was shot in six days after two weeks' rehearsal. "The results were so spectacular that the audience at the premiere gave the number a standing ovation and threw their programs in the air. Broadway impresario Billy Rose even tried to steal Berkeley from Warners to stage his aquacade."

On 27 May 1939, the first U.S. synchronised-swimming competition took place at Wright Junior College between Wright and the Chicago Teachers' College.

In 1924, the first competition in North America was in Montreal, with Peg Seller as the first champion. Other important pioneers of the sport are Beulah Gundling, Käthe Jacobi, Marion Kane Elston, Dawn Bean, Billie MacKellar, Teresa Anderson, Gail Johnson, Gail Emery, Charlotte Davis, Mary Derosier, Norma Olsen, and Clark Leach. Charlotte Davis coached Tracie Ruiz and Candy Costie, who won the gold medal in duet synchronised swimming at the 1984 Olympics in Los Angeles.

In 1933 and 1934, Katherine Curtis organised a show, "The Kay Curtis Modern Mermaids", for the World Exhibition in Chicago. The announcer, Norman Ross, introduced the sport as "synchronized swimming" for the first time. The term eventually became standardised through the AAU. However, Curtis still used the term "rhythmic swimming" in her book, Rhythmic Swimming: A Source Book of Synchronised Swimming and Water Pageantry (Minneapolis: Burgess Publishing Co., 1936).

Curtis persuaded the AAU to make synchronised swimming an officially recognised sport in December 1941, but she herself transferred overseas in 1943. She served as the Recreation Director of the Red Cross under Generals Patton and Eisenhower, during which time she produced the first international aquacade in Caserta, Italy. She was the Director of Travel in post-war Europe until 1962. In 1959, the Helms Hall of Fame officially recognised Curtis (along with Annette Kellerman), ascribing to her the primary development of synchronised swimming. In 1979, the International Swimming Hall of Fame inducted Curtis with similar accolades.

The first Official National Team Championships were held in Chicago at Riis Pool on 11 August 1946. The Town Club 'C' team was the first national champions. The team was composed of: Polly Wesner, Nancy Hanna, Doris Dieskow, Marion Mittlacher, Shirley Brown, Audrey Huettenrauch, Phyllis Burrell and Priscilla Hirsch.

Esther Williams, a national AAU champion swimmer, popularised synchronized swimming during World War II and after, through (often elaborately staged) scenes in Hollywood films such as Bathing Beauty (1944), Million Dollar Mermaid (1952), and Jupiter's Darling (1955). In the 1970s and 1980s, Ft. Lauderdale swimming champion Charkie Phillips revived water ballet on television with The Krofftettes in The Brady Bunch Hour (1976–1977), NBC's The Big Show (1980), and then on screen with Miss Piggy in The Great Muppet Caper (1981).

Margaret Swan Forbes published Coaching Synchronised Swimming Effectively in 1984; it was the first official teaching manual for synchronised swimming.

In July 2017, following a request by the IOC, FINA approved changes to its constitution that renamed synchronised swimming to "artistic swimming". FINA justified the change by stating that it would help to clarify the nature of the sport (with the new name being similar to artistic gymnastics), and claimed it would help "enhance its popularity". The changes received criticism, with swimmers and coaches arguing that they were never consulted, and that the name "artistic swimming" diminishes the athleticism of the sport which already had historically faced an "uphill battle to be taken seriously". Another objection raised was that rebranding would cost federations and other groups involved in the sport sums of money that neither the IOC nor FINA was willing to compensate. Deputy Prime Minister of Russia Vitaly Mutko vowed that the country would still refer to the sport as synchronised swimming, stating that "to keep the name synchronised swimming is our right, and if the Federation itself, the coaches will want it, we will do it". Since then, most national governing bodies have adopted the new name, some such as the U.S. adopted it after a delay (in 2020), with the CEO of USA Artistic Swimming stating that "19 of the top 25 countries in the world are either partially or fully using the name artistic swimming". Competitions where the new name was first used include the 2019 World Aquatics Championships and the 2018 Asian Games. It was also used at the 2020 Summer Olympics and the 2020 European Aquatics Championships.

In 2022, a spattering of competitions introduced men-only individual (solo) events for the first time, including the 2022 European Aquatics Championships and the 2022 World Junior Artistic Swimming Championships. This followed the addition of mixed gender events featuring one male and one female swimmer at the 2015 World Aquatics Championships. Later in the year, in December, the International Olympic Committee announced men were eligible to compete at the 2024 Olympic Games only in a mixed gender team event, with a cap on male participation at 25% of team event members, following the up-to-two men format of mixed gender team events at the 2022 FINA Artistic Swimming World Series.

In 2023, World Aquatics added men's solo events to the artistic swimming program for the first time at a World Aquatics Championships, scheduling the debut for the 2023 World Aquatics Championships.

== Injuries ==
The most common types of injuries that may occur in synchronised swimming are tendon injuries and joint and ligament injuries, with the most commonly injured areas being the shoulder, knees, and the lumbar spine. Synchronised swimmers are injured at a similar rate to athletes in other aquatic sports.

Concussions are a serious issue in the sport, especially in recent decades, as athletes swim closer together and move faster in order to increase the difficulty of their routines. Bill Moreau, the medical director for the U.S. Olympic Committee (USOC), was the lead medical liaison for a two-week training session for the national team in Colorado Springs, during which he was shocked to find that the team members suffered a 50% concussion rate. He said of synchronised swimming, "These women are superior athletes. They're in the pool eight hours a day. Literally, they're within inches of one another, sculling and paddling. As they go through their various routines, they're literally kicking each other in the head." As a result, the USOC began reassessing concussion awareness and prevention for all sports. Swim caps are now available that are meant to offer some protection and may be used when training dangerous moves.

Others believe the incidence of concussions among synchronised swimmers is much higher, especially among the sport's elite athletes. "I would say 100 percent of my athletes will get a concussion at some point", said Myriam Glez, a former French synchronised swimmer and coach. "It might be minor, might be more serious, but at some point or another, they will get hit." In a 2019 survey of US artistic swimmers, 25% said they had sustained a concussion, and another 15% said that they thought they had.

== See also ==
- NHK Twinscam
- Swimming (sport)
- Water aerobics
- Water polo
- Composite stroke
- List of synchronised swimmers
- 2022 FINA Artistic Swimming World Series
