= Artistic swimming at the 2022 World Aquatics Championships =

- Host city: Budapest, Hungary
- Date(s): 17–25 June
- Venue(s): Tamás Széchy Swimming Complex
- Events: 10

Artistic swimming (formally synchronized swimming) at the 2022 World Aquatics Championships was held in Budapest between 17 and 25 June 2022.

== Schedule ==
Ten events were held.

All time are local (UTC+2).

Date	Time	Round
17 June 2022	09:00	Solo technical routine preliminaries
17 June 2022	13:00	Duet technical routine preliminaries
18 June 2022	10:00	Free combination preliminaries
18 June 2022	13:00	Mixed duet technical routine preliminaries
18 June 2022	16:00	Solo technical routine final
19 June 2022	10:00	Team technical routine preliminaries
19 June 2022	16:00	Duet technical routine final
20 June 2022	09:00	Solo free routine preliminaries
20 June 2022	14:00	Mixed duet technical routine final
20 June 2022	16:00	Free combination final
21 June 2022	09:00	Duet free routine preliminaries
21 June 2022	16:00	Team technical routine final
22 June 2022	10:00	Team free routine preliminaries
22 June 2022	16:00	Solo free routine final
23 June 2022	10:00	Highlight routine preliminaries
23 June 2022	16:00	Duet free routine final
24 June 2022	10:00	Mixed duet free routine preliminaries
24 June 2022	16:00	Team free routine final
25 June 2022	13:30	Mixed duet free routine final
25 June 2022	15:00	Highlight routine final

== Medal summary ==
=== Medal table ===
* Host nation (Hungary)

Rank	Nation	Gold	Silver	Bronze	Total
1	China	4	0	2	6
2	Ukraine	2	5	0	7
3	Japan	2	4	1	7
4	Italy	2	1	2	5
5	Austria	0	0	2	2
5	Greece	0	0	2	2
7	Spain	0	0	1	1
Totals (7 entries)		10	10	10	30

=== Medalists ===
Event	Gold		Silver		Bronze	
Solo technical routine	Yukiko Inui; Japan	92.8662	Marta Fiedina; Ukraine	91.9555	Evangelia Platanioti; Greece	89.5110
Solo free routine	Yukiko Inui; Japan	95.3667	Marta Fiedina; Ukraine	93.8000	Evangelia Platanioti; Greece	91.7667
Duet technical routine	China; Wang Liuyi; Wang Qianyi	93.7536	Ukraine; Maryna Aleksiyiva; Vladyslava Aleksiyiva	91.8617	Austria; Anna-Maria Alexandri; Eirini-Marina Alexandri	91.2622
Duet free routine	China; Wang Liuyi; Wang Qianyi	95.5667	Ukraine; Maryna Aleksiyiva; Vladyslava Aleksiyiva	94.1667	Austria; Anna-Maria Alexandri; Eirini-Marina Alexandri	92.8000
Team technical routine	China; Chang Hao; Feng Yu; Wang Ciyue; Wang Liuyi; Wang Qianyi; Xiang Binxuan; Xiao Yanning; Zhang Yayi	94.7202	Japan; Moka Fujii; Moe Higa; Moeka Kijima; Tomoka Sato; Akane Yanagisawa; Mashiro Yasunaga; Megumu Yoshida; Rie Yoshida	92.2261	Italy; Domiziana Cavanna; Linda Cerruti; Costanza Di Camillo; Costanza Ferro; Gemma Galli; Marta Iacoacci; Marta Murru; Enrica Piccoli	91.0191
Team free routine	China; Chang Hao; Feng Yu; Wang Ciyue; Wang Liuyi; Wang Qianyi; Xiang Binxuan; Xiao Yanning; Zhang Yayi	96.7000	Ukraine; Maryna Aleksiyiva; Vladyslava Aleksiyiva; Olesia Derevianchenko; Marta Fiedina; Veronika Hryshko; Sofiia Matsiievska; Anhelina Ovchynnikova; Valeriya Tyshchenko	95.0000	Japan; Moka Fujii; Moe Higa; Moeka Kijima; Tomoka Sato; Hikari Suzuki; Akane Yanagisawa; Mashiro Yasunaga; Megumu Yoshida	93.1333
Highlight routine	Ukraine; Maryna Aleksiyiva; Vladyslava Aleksiyiva; Olesia Derevianchenko; Marta Fiedina; Veronika Hryshko; Sofiia Matsiievska; Daria Moshynska; Anhelina Ovchynnikova; Anastasiia Shmonina; Valeriya Tyshchenko	95.0333	Italy; Domiziana Cavanna; Linda Cerruti; Constanza Di Camillo; Costanza Ferro; Gemma Galli; Marta Iacoacci; Marta Murru; Enrica Piccoli; Federica Sala; Francesca Zunino	92.2667	Spain; Cristina Arámbula; Abril Conesa; Berta Ferreras; Emma García; Mireia Hernández; Meritxell Mas; Alisa Ozhogina; Paula Ramírez; Iris Tió; Blanca Toledano	91.9333
Free routine combination	Ukraine; Maryna Aleksiyiva; Vladyslava Aleksiyiva; Olesia Derevianchenko; Marta Fiedina; Veronika Hryshko; Sofiia Matsiievska; Daria Moshynska; Anhelina Ovchynnikova; Anastasiia Shmonina; Valeriya Tyshchenko	95.0333	Japan; Moka Fujii; Moe Higa; Asaka Hosokawa; Yuka Kawase; Moeka Kijima; Hikari Suzuki; Akane Yanagisawa; Mashiro Yasunaga; Megumu Yoshida; Rie Yoshida	93.5667	Italy; Domiziana Cavanna; Linda Cerruti; Constanza Di Camillo; Costanza Ferro; Gemma Galli; Marta Iacoacci; Marta Murru; Enrica Piccoli; Federica Sala; Francesca Zunino	92.0333
Mixed Duet technical routine	Italy; Giorgio Minisini; Lucrezia Ruggiero	89.2685	Japan; Tomoka Sato; Yotaro Sato	86.5939	China; Shi Haoyu; Zhang Yiyao	86.4425
Mixed Duet free routine	Italy; Giorgio Minisini; Lucrezia Ruggiero	90.9667	Japan; Tomoka Sato; Yotaro Sato	89.7333	China; Shi Haoyu; Zhang Yiyao	88.4000
