= Artistic swimming at the 2023 European Games =

Water sport competitions

- Venue: Oswiecim
- Dates: 21–25 June 2023
- Competitors: 170 expected

Artistic swimming competitions at the 2023 European Games in Oswiecim were held from 21 to 25 June, at the Oswiecim Aquatics Centre.

Unlike in 2015, these events represent a full European Aquatics Artistic Swimming Championships, the first ever held outside a wider European Aquatics Championships, and included mixed sex competition for the first time - historically, like Rhythmic gymnastics and netball, artistic swimming had been viewed as a female only sport.

The event was also a direct qualification event for the duet event at the 2024 Summer Olympics.

== Timetable ==
OC	Opening ceremony	●	Event competitions	1	Event finals	CC	Closing ceremony

June/July		20th Tue	21st Wed	22nd Thu	23rd Fri	24th Sat	25th Sun	26th Mon	27th Tue	28th Wed	29th Thu	30th Fri	1st Sat	2nd Sun	Total events
Ceremonies			OC											CC	
Aquatics	Artistic swimming		●	2	2	3	1								8

== Medalists ==
Event	Gold	Silver	Bronze
Duet technical routine	Austria; Anna-Maria Alexandri; Eirini-Marina Alexandri	Netherlands; Bregje de Brouwer; Marloes Steenbeek	Greece; Sofia Malkogeorgou; Evangelia Platanioti
Duet free routine	Austria; Anna-Maria Alexandri; Eirini-Marina Alexandri	Ukraine; Maryna Aleksiyiva; Vladyslava Aleksiyiva	Great Britain; Kate Shortman; Isabelle Thorpe
Mixed duet technical routine	Italy; Giorgio Minisini; Lucrezia Ruggiero	Spain; Emma García; Dennis González	Great Britain; Beatrice Crass; Ranjuo Tomblin
Mixed duet free routine	Spain; Mireia Hernández; Dennis González	Italy; Giorgio Minisini; Lucrezia Ruggiero	Great Britain; Beatrice Crass; Ranjuo Tomblin
Team technical routine	Spain; Cristina Arámbula; Marina García; Meritxell Mas; Alisa Ozhogina; Paula Ramírez; Sara Saldaña; Iris Tió; Blanca Toledano; Berta Ferreras	Italy; Linda Cerruti; Marta Iacoacci; Sofia Mastroianni; Enrica Piccoli; Lucrezia Ruggiero; Isotta Sportelli; Giulia Vernice; Francesca Zunino; Carmen Rocchino; Giorgio Minisini	France; Laelys Alavez; Anastasia Bayandina; Ambre Esnault; Mayssa Guermoud; Romane Lunel; Eve Planeix; Charlotte Tremble; Laura Tremble; Oriane Jaillardon; Claudia Janvier
Team free routine	Spain; Cristina Arámbula; Berta Ferreras; Marina García; Meritxell Mas; Alisa Ozhogina; Paula Ramírez; Sara Saldaña; Iris Tió; Blanca Toledano	Italy; Linda Cerruti; Marta Iacoacci; Sofia Mastroianni; Giorgio Minisini; Enrica Piccoli; Lucrezia Ruggiero; Isotta Sportelli; Francesca Zunino; Carmen Rocchino; Giulia Vernice	Israel; Shelly Bobritsky; Maya Dorf; Noy Gazala; Catherine Kunin; Aya Mazor; Nikol Nahshonov; Ariel Nassee; Neta Rubichek; Eden Blecher; Shani Sharaizin
Team acrobatic routine	France; Anastasia Bayandina; Ambre Esnault; Mayssa Guermoud; Claudia Janvier; Romane Lunel; Eve Planeix; Charlotte Tremble; Laura Tremble; Manon Disbeaux; Laura Gonzalez	Ukraine; Maryna Aleksiyiva; Vladyslava Aleksiyiva; Marta Fiedina; Veronika Hryshko; Daria Moshynska; Anhelina Ovchynnikova; Anastasiia Shmonina; Valeriya Tyshchenko; Olesia Derevianchenko; Sofiia Matsiievska	Italy; Linda Cerruti; Marta Iacoacci; Sofia Mastroianni; Giorgio Minisini; Enrica Piccoli; Carmen Rocchino; Isotta Sportelli; Francesca Zunino; Lucrezia Ruggiero; Giulia Vernice
Free routine combination	Israel; Eden Blecher; Shelly Bobritsky; Maya Dorf; Noy Gazala; Catherine Kunin; Aya Mazor; Nikol Nahshonov; Ariel Nassee; Neta Rubichek; Shani Sharaizin; Shaya Sar Shalom Nechmad	Germany; Klara Bleyer; Amelie Blumenthal Haz; Marlene Bojer; Maria Denisov; Solene Guisard; Daria Martens; Susana Rovner; Frithjof Seidel; Daria Tonn; Michelle Zimmer	Turkey; Derin Aralp; Duru Kanberoğlu; Ayda Salepçioğlu; Ece Sokullu; Nil Talu; Selin Telci; Ece Üngör; Dila Yildiz; Esmanur Yirmibeş; İsra Yüksel; Melek Andreea Akay; Cansın Kütüçoğlu

== Medal table ==
Rank	NOC	Gold	Silver	Bronze	Total
1	Spain	3	1	0	4
2	Austria	2	0	0	2
3	Italy	1	3	1	5
4	France	1	0	1	2
4	Israel	1	0	1	2
6	Ukraine	0	2	0	2
7	Germany	0	1	0	1
7	Netherlands	0	1	0	1
9	Great Britain	0	0	3	3
10	Greece	0	0	1	1
10	Turkey	0	0	1	1
Totals (11 entries)		8	8	8	24

== Athletes ==
A total of 170 athletes from 20 nations are expected to compete in Artistic swimming at the 2023 European Games.

== Paris 2024 Qualification ==
The artistic swimming meet at the 2023 European Games is a direct qualification event for the artistic swimming program in Paris 2024. A total of 2 quota places, representing one pair, will be awarded for one event in Paris:

Event	Qualification path	Quotas	NOCS
Duet (Free and Technical combined)	One NOC of the highest placed duet pair, combining the scores of the Duet Free and Duet Technical events, will earn two (2) women’s quota places for one duet pair.	2 (1 pair)	Austria
Total quota places awarded		2 (1 pair)	
