= Artistic swimming at the 2023 European Games – Team technical routine =

Team technical at the 2023 European Games
- Venue: Oświęcim
- Dates: 23 June
- Competitors: 64 from 8 nations
- Winning points: 278.4066

Medalists
gold medal	Cristina Arámbula; Marina García; Meritxell Mas; Alisa Ozhogina; Paula Ramírez; Sara Saldaña; Iris Tió; Blanca Toledano	Spain
silver medal	Linda Cerruti; Marta Iacoacci; Sofia Mastroianni; Enrica Piccoli; Lucrezia Ruggiero; Isotta Sportelli; Giulia Vernice; Francesca Zunino	Italy
bronze medal	Laëlys Alavez; Anastasia Bayandina; Ambre Esnault; Mayssa Guermoud; Romane Lunel; Eve Planeix; Charlotte Tremble; Laura Tremble	France

The team technical routine competition of the 2023 European Games was held on 23 June 2023 in Oświęcim, Poland.

== Results ==
All eight entered teams competed in the final. There was no preliminary round.

Rank	Nation	D	E	A	P	Total
1st place, gold medalist(s)	Spain: Cristin Arámbula; Meritxell Mas; Paula Ramírez; Iris Tió; Marina García; Alisa Ozhogina; Sara Saldaña; Blanca Toledano	38.150	172.7566	105.6500	-4.2	278.4066
2nd place, silver medalist(s)	Italy: Linda Cerruti; Sofia Mastroianni; Lucrezia Ruggiero; Giulia Vernice; Marta Iacoacci; Enrica Piccoli; Isotta Sportelli; Francesca Zunino	30.750	148.6145	100.5000	-5.2	249.1145
3rd place, bronze medalist(s)	France: Laëlys Alavez; Ambre Esnault; Romane Lunel; Charlotte Tremble; Anastasia Bayandina; Mayssa Guermoud; Eve Planeix; Laura Tremble	30.350	143.4716	99.2000	-4.5	242.6716
4	Greece: Maria Alzigkouzi Kominea; Eleni Fragkaki; Maria Karapanagiotou; Ifigeneia Krommydaki; Thaleia Dampali; Krystalenia Gialama; Danai Kariori; Sofia Malkogeorgou	28.700	133.1417	96.2000	-6.1	229.3417
5	Ukraine: Maryna Aleksiyiva; Marta Fiedina; Daria Moshynska; Anastasiia Shmonina; Vladyslava Aleksiyiva; Veronika Hryshko; Anhelina Ovchynnikova; Valeriya Tyshchenko	17.150	100.9697	102.8000	-6.2	203.7697
6	Switzerland: Ilona Fahrni; Jessica Jütz; Sofie Müntener; Chloé Regard; Emma Grosvenor; Ladina Lippuner; Alice Ponsar; Babou Schüpbach	20.100	98.2566	92.3500	-10.1	190.6066
7	Portugal: Lara Botelho; Inês Dubini; Carlota Fonseca; Marta Moreira; Anna Carvalho; Filipa Faria; Beatriz Gama; Mariana Rocha	22.250	99.6558	85.0000	-6.7	184.6558
8	Great Britain: Eleanor Blinkhorn; Millicent Costello; Aimee Laurence; Robyn Swatman; Isobel Blinkhorn; Isobel Davies; Daniella Lloyd; Isabelle Thorpe	17.350	87.3500	90.3414	-8.2	177.6914
