= Ukraine at the 2022 World Aquatics Championships =

- Flag of Ukraine
- World Aquatics code: UKR
- National federation: Ukrainian Swimming Federation

in Budapest, Hungary
- Competitors: 32 in 4 sports
- Medals Ranked 8th: Gold 2 Silver 6 Bronze 2 Total 10

World Aquatics Championships appearances
- 1994; 1998; 2001; 2003; 2005; 2007; 2009; 2011; 2013; 2015; 2017; 2019; 2022; 2023; 2024; 2025

Other related appearances
- Soviet Union (1973–1991)

Ukraine competed at the 2022 World Aquatics Championships in Budapest, Hungary from 18 June to 3 July.

== Medalists ==
Medal	Name	Sport	Event	Date
Gold	Maryna Aleksiyiva; Vladyslava Aleksiyiva; Olesia Derevianchenko; Marta Fiedina; Veronika Hryshko; Sofiia Matsiievska; Daria Moshynska; Anhelina Ovchynnikova; Anastasiia Shmonina; Valeriya Tyshchenko	Artistic swimming	Free routine combination	20 June
Gold	Maryna Aleksiyiva; Vladyslava Aleksiyiva; Olesia Derevianchenko; Marta Fiedina; Veronika Hryshko; Sofiia Matsiievska; Daria Moshynska; Anhelina Ovchynnikova; Anastasiia Shmonina; Valeriya Tyshchenko	Artistic swimming	Highlight routine	25 June
Silver	Marta Fiedina	Artistic swimming	Solo technical routine	18 June
Silver	Maryna Aleksiyiva; Vladyslava Aleksiyiva	Artistic swimming	Duet technical routine	19 June
Silver	Marta Fiedina	Artistic swimming	Solo free routine	22 June
Silver	Maryna Aleksiyiva; Vladyslava Aleksiyiva	Artistic swimming	Duet free routine	23 June
Silver	Maryna Aleksiyiva; Vladyslava Aleksiyiva; Olesia Derevianchenko; Marta Fiedina; Veronika Hryshko; Sofiia Matsiievska; Anhelina Ovchynnikova; Valeriya Tyshchenko	Artistic swimming	Team free routine	24 June
Silver	Oleksiy Sereda; Sofiya Lyskun	Diving	Mixed synchronized 10 metre platform	1 July
Bronze	Mykhailo Romanchuk	Swimming	Men's 800 metre freestyle	21 June
Bronze	Mykhailo Romanchuk	Open water swimming	Men's 5 km	27 June

== Artistic swimming ==
Ukraine entered 11 artistic swimmers.

Women

Athlete	Event	Preliminaries		Final	
Athlete	Event	Points	Rank	Points	Rank
Marta Fiedina	Solo technical routine	90.9382	2 Q	91.9555	2nd place, silver medalist(s)
Marta Fiedina	Solo free routine	92.6333	2 Q	93.8000	2nd place, silver medalist(s)
Maryna Aleksiyiva; Vladyslava Aleksiyiva	Duet technical routine	91.8565	2 Q	91.8617	2nd place, silver medalist(s)
Maryna Aleksiyiva; Vladyslava Aleksiyiva	Duet free routine	94.0000	2 Q	94.1667	2nd place, silver medalist(s)
	Team technical routine	did not start		did not advance	
Maryna Aleksiyiva; Vladyslava Aleksiyiva; Olesia Derevianchenko; Marta Fiedina; Veronika Hryshko; Sofiia Matsiievska; Anhelina Ovchynnikova; Valeriya Tyshchenko	Team free routine	94.3667	2 Q	95.0000	2nd place, silver medalist(s)
Maryna Aleksiyiva; Vladyslava Aleksiyiva; Olesia Derevianchenko; Marta Fiedina; Veronika Hryshko; Sofiia Matsiievska; Daria Moshynska; Anhelina Ovchynnikova; Anastasiia Shmonina; Valeriya Tyshchenko	Free routine combination	93.9333	1 Q	95.0333	1st place, gold medalist(s)
Maryna Aleksiyiva; Vladyslava Aleksiyiva; Olesia Derevianchenko; Marta Fiedina; Veronika Hryshko; Sofiia Matsiievska; Daria Moshynska; Anhelina Ovchynnikova; Anastasiia Shmonina; Valeriya Tyshchenko	Highlight routine	94.2333	1 Q	95.0333	1st place, gold medalist(s)

== Diving ==
Ukraine entered 9 divers.

Men

Athlete	Event	Preliminaries		Semifinals		Final	
Athlete	Event	Points	Rank	Points	Rank	Points	Rank
Oleh Kolodiy	1 m springboard	277.65	37	—N/a		did not advance	
Danylo Konovalov	3 m springboard	260.65	50	did not advance			
Yevhen Naumenko	10 m platform	326.25	26	did not advance			
Stanislav Oliferchyk	1 m springboard	312.80	30	—N/a		did not advance	
Oleksiy Sereda	10 m platform	437.55	4 Q	458.80	4 Q	477.45	6
Oleksandr Horshkovozov; Oleh Kolodiy	Synchronized 3 m springboard	353.64	8 Q	—N/a		362.43	9
Kirill Boliukh; Oleksiy Sereda	Synchronized 10 m platform	393.00	2 Q	—N/a		396.27	4

Women

Athlete	Event	Preliminaries		Semifinals		Final	
Athlete	Event	Points	Rank	Points	Rank	Points	Rank
Sofiya Lyskun	10 m platform	323.65	5 Q	279.40	14	did not advance	
Kseniya Baylo; Sofiya Lyskun	Synchronized 10 m platform	267.72	8 Q	—N/a		283.08	6

Mixed

Athlete	Event	Preliminaries		Final	
Athlete	Event	Points	Rank	Points	Rank
Oleksiy Sereda; Sofiya Lyskun	Synchronized 10 m platform	—N/a		317.01	2nd place, silver medalist(s)

== Open water swimming ==
Ukraine entered 3 open water swimmers ( 1 male and 2 female)

Men

Athlete	Event	Time	Rank
Mykhailo Romanchuk	5 km	53:13.9	3rd place, bronze medalist(s)
Mykhailo Romanchuk	10 km	1:51:41.6	6

Women

Athlete	Event	Time	Rank
Mariia Bondarenko	5 km	1:05:56.3	44
Mariia Bondarenko	10 km	2:18:41.7	51
Krystyna Panchishko	5 km	1:01:00.3	25
Krystyna Panchishko	10 km	2:06:52.8	26

== Swimming ==
Ukraine entered 10 swimmers.

Men

Athlete	Event	Heat		Semifinal		Final	
Athlete	Event	Time	Rank	Time	Rank	Time	Rank
Vladyslav Bukhov	50 m freestyle	21.87	5 Q	21.87	10	did not advance	
Vladyslav Bukhov	50 m butterfly	23.66	25	did not advance			
Andriy Govorov	50 m freestyle	22.71	41	did not advance			
Andriy Govorov	50 m butterfly	23.34	11 Q	23.31	14	did not advance	
Denys Kesil	200 m butterfly	1:58.36	22	did not advance			
Volodymyr Lisovets	100 m breaststroke	1:02.33	33	did not advance			
Vadym Naumenko	200 m individual medley	2:02.00	24	did not advance			
Maksym Ovchinnikov	50 m breaststroke	27.99	24	did not advance			
Maksym Ovchinnikov	200 m breaststroke	2:13.33	21	did not advance			
Mykhailo Romanchuk	400 m freestyle	3:52.92	24	—N/a		did not advance	
Mykhailo Romanchuk	800 m freestyle	7:44.75	1 Q	—N/a		7:40.05 NR	3rd place, bronze medalist(s)
Mykhailo Romanchuk	1500 m freestyle	14:50.68	2 Q	—N/a		14:40.98	5
Sergii Shevtsov	100 m freestyle	50.28	45	did not advance			
Oleksandr Zheltiakov	100 m backstroke	54.86	21	did not advance			
Oleksandr Zheltiakov	200 m backstroke	2:02.69	23	did not advance			

Women

Athlete	Event	Heat		Semifinal		Final	
Athlete	Event	Time	Rank	Time	Rank	Time	Rank
Kamila Isaieva	100 m breaststroke	1:09.66	29	did not advance			
Kamila Isaieva	200 m breaststroke	2:32.53	25	did not advance			

Legend: (*) = Swimmers who participated in the heat only.
