= Ukraine at the 2024 World Aquatics Championships =

- Flag of Ukraine
- FINA code: UKR
- National federation: Ukrainian Swimming Federation
- Website: usf.org.ua

in Doha, Qatar
- Competitors: 28 in 4 sports
- Medals Ranked 17th: Gold 1 Silver 1 Bronze 2 Total 4

World Aquatics Championships appearances
- 1994; 1998; 2001; 2003; 2005; 2007; 2009; 2011; 2013; 2015; 2017; 2019; 2022; 2023; 2024

Other related appearances
- Soviet Union (1973–1991)

Ukraine competed at the 2024 World Aquatics Championships in Doha, Qatar from 2 to 18 February.

== Medalists ==
Medal	Name	Sport	Event	Date
1st place, gold medalist(s)	Vladyslav Bukhov	Swimming	Men's 50 metre freestyle	17 February 2024
2nd place, silver medalist(s)	Maryna Aleksiiva Vladyslava Aleksiiva Marta Fiedina Oleksandra Goretska; Veronika Hryshko Daria Moshynska Anastasiia Shmonina Valeriya Tyshchenko	Artistic swimming	Team acrobatic routine	4 February 2024
3rd place, bronze medalist(s)	Oleksiy Sereda	Diving	Men's 10 metre platform	10 February 2024
3rd place, bronze medalist(s)	Kirill Boliukh; Oleksiy Sereda	Diving	Men's synchronized 10 metre platform	8 February 2024

== Competitors ==
The following is the list of competitors in the Championships.

Sport	Men	Women	Total
Artistic swimming	0	8	8
Diving	6	5	11
High diving	2	0	2
Swimming	7	0	7
Total	15	13	28

== Artistic swimming ==
Women

Athlete	Event	Preliminaries		Final	
Athlete	Event	Points	Rank	Points	Rank
Maryna Aleksiyiva; Vladyslava Aleksiyiva	Duet technical routine	210.9650	20	Did not advance	
Maryna Aleksiyiva; Vladyslava Aleksiyiva	Duet free routine	232.3936	7 Q	233.1437	8

Mixed

Athlete	Event	Preliminaries		Final	
Athlete	Event	Points	Rank	Points	Rank
Maryna Aleksiiva; Vladyslava Aleksiiva; Marta Fiedina; Oleksandra Goretska; Veronika Hryshko; Daria Moshynska; Anastasiia Shmonina; Valeriya Tyshchenko	Team technical routine	234.8733	7 Q	206.7175	10
Maryna Aleksiiva; Vladyslava Aleksiiva; Marta Fiedina; Oleksandra Goretska; Veronika Hryshko; Daria Moshynska; Anastasiia Shmonina; Valeriya Tyshchenko	Team free routine	297.2999	5 Q	233.5229	9
Maryna Aleksiiva; Vladyslava Aleksiiva; Marta Fiedina; Oleksandra Goretska; Veronika Hryshko; Daria Moshynska; Anastasiia Shmonina; Valeriya Tyshchenko	Team acrobatic routine	243.2134	2 Q	243.3167	2nd place, silver medalist(s)

== Diving ==
Men

Athlete	Event	Preliminaries		Semifinals		Final	
Athlete	Event	Points	Rank	Points	Rank	Points	Rank
Kyrylo Azarov	1 m springboard	311.80	17	—		Did not advance	
Kyrylo Azarov	3 m springboard	294.25	47	Did not advance			
Danylo Konovalov	1 m springboard	356.90	8 Q	—		349.55	8
Danylo Konovalov	3 m springboard	325.90	38	Did not advance			
Yevhen Naumenko	10 m platform	354.70	22	Did not advance			
Oleksiy Sereda	10 m platform	446.40	5 Q	441.70	5 Q	528.65	3rd place, bronze medalist(s)
Oleh Kolodiy; Danylo Konovalov	3 m synchro springboard	—				363.12	6
Kirill Boliukh; Oleksiy Sereda	10 m synchro platform	—				406.47	3rd place, bronze medalist(s)

Women

Athlete	Event	Preliminaries		Semifinals		Final	
Athlete	Event	Points	Rank	Points	Rank	Points	Rank
Karina Hlyzhina	10 m platform	237.00	28	Did not advance			
Viktoriya Kesar	3 m springboard	276.30	8 Q	262.70	12 Q	208.25	12
Sofiya Lyskun	10 m platform	281.70	14 Q	249.70	17	Did not advance	
Viktoriya Kesar; Hanna Pysmenska	3 m synchro springboardm	—				277.47	5
Kseniya Baylo; Sofiya Lyskun	10 m synchro platform	—				292.50	5

Mixed

Athlete	Event	Final	
Athlete	Event	Points	Rank
Kyrylo Azarov; Hanna Pysmenska	3 m synchro springboard	235.50	13

== High diving ==
Athlete	Event	Points	Rank
Vadym Nevinhlovskyi	Men's high diving	264.95	18
Oleksiy Pryhorov	Men's high diving	318.90	10

== Swimming ==
Ukraine entered 7 swimmers.

Men

Athlete	Event	Heat		Semifinal		Final	
Athlete	Event	Time	Rank	Time	Rank	Time	Rank
Vladyslav Bukhov	50 metre freestyle	21.56	2 Q	21.38 NR	2 Q	21.44	1st place, gold medalist(s)
Vladyslav Bukhov	100 metre freestyle	49.24	26	Did not advance			
Andriy Govorov	50 metre freestyle	22.48	33	Did not advance			
Andriy Govorov	50 metre butterfly	23.63	21	Did not advance			
Denys Kesil	100 metre butterfly	53.57	29	Did not advance			
Denys Kesil	200 metre butterfly	1:57.42	12 Q	1:57.67	13	Did not advance	
Vadym Naumenko	200 metre individual medley	2:01.87	19	Did not advance			
Maksym Ovchinnikov	50 metre breaststroke	28.62	34	Did not advance			
Maksym Ovchinnikov	100 metre breaststroke	1:00.72	21	Did not advance			
Maksym Ovchinnikov	200 metre breaststroke	2:11.55	10 Q	2:11.82	12	Did not advance	
Mykhailo Romanchuk	800 metre freestyle	7:47.20	6 Q	—		7:54.51	8
Mykhailo Romanchuk	1500 metre freestyle	14:51.83	4 Q	—		14:47.54	5
Oleksandr Zheltyakov	50 metre backstroke	25.60	20	Did not advance			
Oleksandr Zheltyakov	100 metre backstroke	54.24	16 Q	54.05	15	Did not advance	
Oleksandr Zheltyakov	200 metre backstroke	2:01.81	23	Did not advance			
