= Ukraine at the 2023 World Aquatics Championships =

- Flag of Ukraine
- World Aquatics code: UKR
- National federation: Ukrainian Swimming Federation
- Website: usf.org.ua

in Fukuoka, Japan
- Competitors: 22 in 5 sports
- Medals Ranked 20th: Gold 0 Silver 1 Bronze 1 Total 2

World Aquatics Championships appearances
- 1994; 1998; 2001; 2003; 2005; 2007; 2009; 2011; 2013; 2015; 2017; 2019; 2022; 2023; 2024; 2025

Other related appearances
- Soviet Union (1973–1991)

Ukraine is set to compete at the 2023 World Aquatics Championships in Fukuoka, Japan from 14 to 30 July.

== Medalists ==
Medal	Name	Sport	Event	Date
Silver	Kirill Boliukh; Oleksiy Sereda	Diving	Men's synchronized 10 m platform	July 17
Bronze	Maryna Aleksiiva; Vladyslava Aleksiiva; Marta Fiedina; Veronika Hryshko; Daria Moshynska; Anhelina Ovchynnikova; Anastasiia Shmonina; Valeriya Tyshchenko	Artistic swimming	Team free routine	July 21

Medals by sport
Sport	1st place, gold medalist(s)	2nd place, silver medalist(s)	3rd place, bronze medalist(s)	Total
Diving	0	1	0	1
Artistic swimming	0	0	1	1

== Artistic swimming ==
Ukraine entered 8 artistic swimmers.

Women

Athlete	Event	Preliminaries		Final	
Athlete	Event	Points	Rank	Points	Rank
Maryna Aleksiiva; Vladyslava Aleksiiva	Duet technical routine	274.1934	3 Q	213.1599	10
Maryna Aleksiiva; Vladyslava Aleksiiva	Duet free routine	251.0981	2 Q	224.6375	6

Mixed

Athlete	Event	Preliminaries		Final	
Athlete	Event	Points	Rank	Points	Rank
Maryna Aleksiiva; Vladyslava Aleksiiva; Marta Fiedina; Veronika Hryshko; Daria Moshynska; Anhelina Ovchynnikova; Anastasiia Shmonina; Valeriya Tyshchenko	Team acrobatic routine	227.9200	3 Q	204.3634	7
Maryna Aleksiiva; Vladyslava Aleksiiva; Marta Fiedina; Veronika Hryshko; Daria Moshynska; Anhelina Ovchynnikova; Anastasiia Shmonina; Valeriya Tyshchenko	Team technical routine	230.0000	8 Q	202.7401	11
Maryna Aleksiiva; Vladyslava Aleksiiva; Marta Fiedina; Veronika Hryshko; Daria Moshynska; Anhelina Ovchynnikova; Anastasiia Shmonina; Valeriya Tyshchenko	Team free routine	275.7209	4 Q	256.2415	3rd place, bronze medalist(s)

== Diving ==
Ukraine entered 2 divers.

Men

Athlete	Event	Preliminaries		Semifinals		Final	
Athlete	Event	Points	Rank	Points	Rank	Points	Rank
Oleh Kolodiy	3 m springboard	362.35	28	Did not advance			
Danylo Konovalov	1 m springboard	360.25	12 Q	—N/a		354.15	11
Danylo Konovalov	3 m springboard	344.45	38	Did not advance			
Yevhen Naumenko	10 m platform	411.75	8 Q	394.35	15	Did not advance	
Oleksiy Sereda	10 m platform	409.10	10 Q	418.15	12 Q	475.55	6
Oleh Kolodiy; Danylo Konovalov	3 m synchro springboard	325.23	21	—N/a		Did not advance	
Kirill Boliukh; Oleksiy Sereda	10 m synchro platform	404.22	4 Q	—N/a		439.32	2nd place, silver medalist(s)

Women

Athlete	Event	Preliminaries		Semifinals		Final	
Athlete	Event	Points	Rank	Points	Rank	Points	Rank
Kseniya Baylo; Sofia Esman	10 m synchro platform	268.20	8 Q	—N/a		252.60	9

Mixed

Athlete	Event	Final	
Athlete	Event	Points	Rank
Kirill Boliukh; Kseniya Baylo	10 m synchro platform	295.44	4

== High diving ==
Ukraine entered 1 high diver.

Men

Athlete	Event	Points	Rank
Oleksiy Prygorov	Men's high diving	423.15	4

== Open water swimming ==
Ukraine entered 2 open water swimmers.

Men

Athlete	Event	Time	Rank
Sergii Frolov	Men's 5 km	59:59.5	44
Mykhailo Romanchuk	Men's 5 km	55:37.0	11

== Swimming ==
Ukraine entered 5 swimmers.

Men

Athlete	Event	Heat		Semifinal		Final	
Athlete	Event	Time	Rank	Time	Rank	Time	Rank
Vladyslav Bukhov	50 metre freestyle	21.92	11 Q	21.91	9	Did not advance	
Vladyslav Bukhov	100 metre freestyle	49.48	38	Did not advance			
Andriy Govorov	50 metre freestyle	22.18	25	Did not advance			
Andriy Govorov	50 metre butterfly	23.44	21	Did not advance			
Denys Kesil	100 metre butterfly	53.47	41	Did not advance			
Denys Kesil	200 metre butterfly	1:55.75	11 Q	1:56.89	14	Did not advance	
Maksym Ovchynnikov	50 metre breaststroke	27.78	25	Did not advance			
Maksym Ovchynnikov	100 metre breaststroke	1:01.01	24	Did not advance			
Maksym Ovchynnikov	200 metre breaststroke	2:11.71	16 Q	2:11.95	16	Did not advance	
Mykhailo Romanchuk	800 metre freestyle	7:44.07	6 Q	—N/a		7:43.08	6
Mykhailo Romanchuk	1500 metre freestyle	14:52.15	5 Q	—N/a		14:53.21	7
