= Artistic swimming at the 2023 European Games – Team free routine =

Team free at the 2023 European Games
- Venue: Oświęcim
- Dates: 21 June (preliminary); 25 June (final)
- Competitors: 56 from 7 nations
- Winning points: 303.2751

Medalists
gold medal	Cristin Arambula; Berta Ferreras; Marina García; Meritxell Mas; Alisa Ozhogina; Paula Ramírez; Sara Saldaña; Iris Tió	Spain
silver medal	Linda Cerruti; Marta Iacoacci; Sofia Mastroianni; Giorgio Minisini; Enrica Piccoli; Lucrezia Ruggiero; Isotta Sportelli; Francesca Zunino	Italy
bronze medal	Shelly Bobritsky; Maya Dorf; Noy Gazala; Catherine Kunin; Aya Mazor; Nikol Nahshonov; Ariel Nassee; Neta Rubichek	Israel

The team free routine competition of the 2023 European Games was held on 21 and 25 June 2023 in Oświęcim, Poland.

== Results ==
All seven entered teams competed in a preliminary round, before going through to the final.

Rank	Nation	Preliminary					Final				
Rank	Nation	D	E	A	P	Total	D	E	A	P	Total
1st place, gold medalist(s)	Spain: Cristin Arambula; Marina García; Alisa Ozhogina; Sara Saldaña; Berta Ferreras; Meritxell Mas; Paula Ramírez; Iris Tió	45.750	182.5251	120.7500	-2.6	303.2751	35.150	139.4374	122.2000	-4.2	261.6374
2nd place, silver medalist(s)	Italy: Linda Cerruti; Sofia Mastroianni; Enrica Piccoli; Isotta Sportelli; Marta Iacoacci; Giorgio Minisini; Lucrezia Ruggiero; Francesca Zunino	39.235	157.729	117.7000	-4.1	275.429	34.885	136.6209	116.8500	-5.9	253.4709
3rd place, bronze medalist(s)	Israel: Shelly Bobritsky; Noy Gazala; Aya Mazor; Ariel Nassee; Maya Dorf; Catherine Kunin; Nikol Nahshonov; Neta Rubichek	34.350	131.1271	109.8500	-3.8	240.9771	34.850	130.7001	112.9000	-7.3	243.600
4	Ukraine: Maryna Aleksiyiva; Marta Fiedina; Daria Moshynska; Anastasiia Shmonina; Vladyslava Aleksiyiva; Veronika Hryshko; Anhelina Ovchynnikova; Valeriya Tyshchenko	35.400	138.3042	116.3500	-7.2	254.6542	27.150	102.9439	119.2500	-7.1	222.1939
5	Great Britain: Eleanor Blinkhorn; Millicent Costello; Isobel Davies; Daniella Lloyd; Isobel Blinkhorn; Beatrice Crass; Aimee Lawrence; Robyn Swatman	27.850	100.8418	99.2000	-6.1	200.0418	31.050	111.3356	101.0500	-6.5	212.3856
6	Switzerland: Ilona Fahrni; Jessica Jütz; Sofie Müntener; Babou Schüpbach; Emma Grosvenor; Ladina Lippuner; Alice Ponsar; Chloé Regard	31.150	116.6107	105.3500	-4.8	221.9607	24.800	91.0333	109.0000	-6.3	200.0333
7	Germany: Klara Bleyer; Maria Denisov; Daria Martens; Daria Tonn; Marlene Bojer; Solene Guisard; Susana Rovner; Michelle Zimmer	27.575	102.4929	107.3000	-5.6	209.7929	25.325	91.7783	107.1500	-7.0	198.9283
