= Artistic swimming at the 2022 World Aquatics Championships – Highlight routine =

Highlight routine at the 2022 World Aquatics Championships
- Venue: Szechy Pool
- Location: Budapest, Hungary
- Dates: 23 June (preliminary); 25 June (final)
- Competitors: 150 from 15 nations
- Teams: 15
- Winning points: 95.0333

Medalists
| gold medal | Maryna Aleksiiva; Vladyslava Aleksiiva; Olesia Derevianchenko; Marta Fiedina; Veronika Hryshko; Sofiia Matsiievska; Daria Moshynska; Anhelina Ovchynnikova; Anastasiia Shmonina; Valeriya Tyshchenko | Ukraine |
| silver medal | Domiziana Cavanna; Linda Cerruti; Constanza di Camillo; Costanza Ferro; Gemma Galli; Marta Iacoacci; Marta Murru; Enrica Piccoli; Federica Sala; Francesca Zunino | Italy |
| bronze medal | Cristina Arámbula; Abril Conesa; Berta Ferreras; Emma García; Mireia Hernández; Meritxell Mas; Alisa Ozhogina; Paula Ramírez; Iris Tió; Blanca Toledano | Spain |

The Highlight routine competition at the 2022 World Aquatics Championships was held on 23 and 25 June 2022.

== Results ==
The preliminary round was started on 23 June at 10:00. The final was held on 25 June at 15:00.

| Rank | Nation | Preliminary | | Final | |
| Rank | Nation | Points | Rank | Points | Rank |
|---|---|---|---|---|---|
| 1st place, gold medalist(s) | Ukraine | 94.2333 | 1 | 95.0333 | 1 |
| 2nd place, silver medalist(s) | Italy | 91.6667 | 2 | 92.2667 | 2 |
| 3rd place, bronze medalist(s) | Spain | 91.3667 | 3 | 91.9333 | 3 |
| 4 | Mexico | 88.5333 | 4 | 89.3667 | 4 |
| 5 | United States | 87.5000 | 6 | 87.8667 | 5 |
| 6 | Greece | 87.6000 | 5 | 87.2333 | 6 |
| 7 | Canada | 85.1000 | 7 | 85.2000 | 7 |
| 8 | Kazakhstan | 83.0333 | 8 | 83.7667 | 8 |
| 9 | Brazil | 81.2000 | 9 | 81.6667 | 9 |
| 10 | Switzerland | 80.6333 | 10 | 80.9000 | 10 |
| 11 | Hungary | 78.5000 | 11 | 79.0667 | 11 |
| 12 | Slovakia | 77.0667 | 12 | 77.2667 | 12 |
| 13 | Australia | 72.9667 | 13 | did not advance | |
| 14 | Thailand | 70.7000 | 14 | did not advance | |
| 15 | Costa Rica | 65.7667 | 15 | did not advance | |
