= Artistic swimming at the 2022 European Aquatics Championships – Women's solo free routine =

Solo free routine at the 2022 European Aquatics Championships
- Venue: Foro Italico
- Dates: 11 August (preliminary); 14 August (final)
- Competitors: 22 from 22 nations
- Winning points: 94.633

Medalists
gold medal	Marta Fiedina	Ukraine
silver medal	Linda Cerruti	Italy
bronze medal	Vasiliki Alexandri	Austria

The Solo free routine competition of the 2022 European Aquatics Championships was held on 11 and 14 August 2022.

== Results ==
The preliminary round was held on 11 August at 09:30. The final round was held on 14 August at 09:30.

Rank	Swimmer	Nationality	Preliminary		Final	
Rank	Swimmer	Nationality	Points	Rank	Points	Rank
1st place, gold medalist(s)	Marta Fiedina	Ukraine	94.0000	1	94.6333	1
2nd place, silver medalist(s)	Linda Cerruti	Italy	91.3000	2	92.1000	2
3rd place, bronze medalist(s)	Vasiliki Alexandri	Austria	90.3333	4	91.8333	3
4	Evangelia Platanioti	Greece	91.0667	3	90.6000	4
5	Eve Planeix	France	88.1667	5	89.0333	5
6	Marlene Bojer	Germany	83.6667	6	85.1667	6
7	Polina Prikazchikova	Israel	82.4333	8	83.8333	7
8	Ilona Fahrni	Switzerland	82.5333	7	82.8000	8
9	Robyn Swatman	Great Britain	80.7667	9	82.1667	9
10	Maria Alavidze	Georgia	80.5000	10	81.3000	10
11	Jasmine Verbena	San Marino	80.1333	11	81.2000	11
12	Viktória Reichová	Slovakia	77.4667	12	78.2333	12
13	Aleksandra Atanasova	Bulgaria	76.1000	13	did not advance	
14	Karolína Klusková	Czech Republic	75.5333	14	did not advance	
15	Klara Šilobodec	Croatia	74.3333	15	did not advance	
16	Szabina Hungler	Hungary	74.2667	16	did not advance	
17	Sofija Džipković	Serbia	73.6000	17	did not advance	
18	Ece Üngör	Turkey	72.3667	18	did not advance	
19	Clara Ternström	Sweden	72.1000	19	did not advance	
20	Pinja Kekki	Finland	71.6667	20	did not advance	
21	Nika Seljak	Slovenia	70.1667	21	did not advance	
22	Ana Culic	Malta	68.6000	22	did not advance	
