= Artistic swimming at the 2022 World Aquatics Championships – Free routine combination =

Free routine combination at the 2022 World Aquatics Championships
- Venue: Szechy Pool
- Location: Budapest, Hungary
- Dates: 18 June (preliminary); 20 June (final)
- Competitors: 100 from 10 nations
- Teams: 10
- Winning points: 95.0333

Medalists
gold medal	Maryna Aleksiiva; Vladyslava Aleksiiva; Olesia Derevianchenko; Marta Fiedina; Veronika Hryshko; Sofiia Matsiievska; Daria Moshynska; Anhelina Ovchynnikova; Anastasiia Shmonina; Valeriya Tyshchenko	Ukraine
silver medal	Moka Fujii; Moe Higa; Asaka Hosokawa; Yuka Kawase; Moeka Kijima; Hikari Suzuki; Akane Yanagisawa; Mashiro Yasunaga; Megumu Yoshida; Rie Yoshida	Japan
bronze medal	Domiziana Cavanna; Linda Cerruti; Costanza Di Camillo; Costanza Ferro; Gemma Galli; Marta Iacoacci; Marta Murru; Enrica Piccoli; Federica Sala; Francesca Zunino	Italy

The Free routine combination competition at the 2022 World Aquatics Championships was held on 18 and 20 June 2022.

== Results ==
The preliminary round was started on 18 June at 10:00. The final was held on 20 June at 16:00.

Rank	Nation	Preliminary		Final	
Rank	Nation	Points	Rank	Points	Rank
1st place, gold medalist(s)	Ukraine	93.9333	1	95.0333	1
2nd place, silver medalist(s)	Japan	92.8333	2	93.5667	2
3rd place, bronze medalist(s)	Italy	90.9667	3	92.0333	3
4	Greece	86.9333	4	88.2000	4
5	Israel	85.5333	5	85.9667	5
6	Great Britain	83.5333	6	84.6333	6
7	Kazakhstan	81.1333	7	82.6333	7
8	Hungary	78.7333	8	80.4667	8
9	Brazil	78.7333	8	80.3333	9
10	Thailand	67.5000	10	68.5667	10
