= Artistic swimming at the 2022 European Aquatics Championships – Free routine combination =

Free routine combination at the 2022 European Aquatics Championships
- Venue: Foro Italico
- Dates: 14 August
- Competitors: 60 from 6 nations
- Winning points: 95.2000

Medalists
gold medal	Maryna Aleksiiva; Vladyslava Aleksiiva; Olesia Derevianchenko; Marta Fiedina; Veronika Hryshko; Sofiia Matsiievska; Daria Moshynska; Anhelina Ovchynnikova; Anastasiia Shmonina; Valeriya Tyshchenko	Ukraine
silver medal	Domiziana Cavanna; Linda Cerruti; Costanza Di Camillo; Costanza Ferro; Gemma Galli; Marta Iacoacci; Marta Murru; Enrica Piccoli; Federica Sala; Francesca Zunino	Italy
bronze medal	Zoi Agrafioti; Maria Alzigkouzi Kominea; Eleni Fragkaki; Krystalenia Gialama; Zoi Karangelou; Maria Karapanagiotou; Danai Kariori; Ifigeneia Krommydaki; Sofia Malkogeorgou; Andriana Misikevych	Greece

The Free routine combination competition of the 2022 European Aquatics Championships was held on 14 August 2022.

== Results ==
The event was held on 14 August at 15:00.

Rank	Nation	Swimmers	Points
1st place, gold medalist(s)	Ukraine	Maryna Aleksiiva; Vladyslava Aleksiiva; Olesia Derevianchenko; Marta Fiedina; Veronika Hryshko; Sofiia Matsiievska; Daria Moshynska; Anhelina Ovchynnikova; Anastasiia Shmonina; Valeriya Tyshchenko	95.2000
2nd place, silver medalist(s)	Italy	Domiziana Cavanna; Linda Cerruti; Costanza Di Camillo; Costanza Ferro; Gemma Galli; Marta Iacoacci; Marta Murru; Enrica Piccoli; Federica Sala; Francesca Zunino	92.6667
3rd place, bronze medalist(s)	Greece	Zoi Agrafioti; Maria Alzigkouzi Kominea; Eleni Fragkaki; Krystalenia Gialama; Zoi Karangelou; Maria Karapanagiotou; Danai Kariori; Ifigeneia Krommydaki; Sofia Malkogeorgou; Andriana Misikevych	89.4000
4	Great Britain	Kate Shortman; Isabelle Thorpe; Robyn Swatman; Laura Turberville; Millicent Costello; Cerys Hughes; Daisy Gunn; Daniella Lloyd; Isobel Blinkhorn; Isobel Davies	84.5000
5	Israel	Shelly Bobritsky; Maya Dorf; Noy Gazala; Catherine Kunin; Nikol Nahshonov; Ariel Nassee; Avital Podkopaev; Polina Prikazchikova; Neta Rubichek; Shani Sharaizin	83.3333
6	Hungary	Anna Apáthy; Niké Barta; Linda Farkas; Boglárka Gács; Lilien Götz; Hanna Hatala; Szabina Hungler; Panna Szakáll; Léna Szórát; Blanka Taksonyi	79.4667
