= Artistic swimming at the 2022 European Aquatics Championships – Women's solo technical routine =

Solo technical routine at the 2022 European Aquatics Championships
- Venue: Foro Italico
- Dates: 12 August
- Competitors: 20 from 20 nations
- Winning points: 92.6394

Medalists
gold medal	Marta Fiedina	Ukraine
silver medal	Linda Cerruti	Italy
bronze medal	Vasiliki Alexandri	Austria

The Solo technical routine competition of the 2022 European Aquatics Championships was held on 12 August 2022.

== Results ==
The final was held on 12 August at 15:00.

Rank	Swimmers	Nationality	Points
1st place, gold medalist(s)	Marta Fiedina	Ukraine	92.6394
2nd place, silver medalist(s)	Linda Cerruti	Italy	90.8839
3rd place, bronze medalist(s)	Vasiliki Alexandri	Austria	90.0156
4	Evangelia Platanioti	Greece	89.9965
5	Kate Shortman	Great Britain	85.0690
6	Oriane Jaillardon	France	84.6909
7	Marlene Bojer	Germany	81.9748
8	Ilona Fahrni	Switzerland	80.3979
9	Jasmine Verbena	San Marino	80.2443
10	Karolína Klusková	Czech Republic	76.4867
11	Viktória Reichová	Slovakia	75.4606
12	Aleksandra Atanasova	Bulgaria	74.9366
13	Sude Dicle	Turkey	72.2716
14	Leila Olivia Marxer	Liechtenstein	70.0434
15	Klara Šilobodec	Croatia	69.8420
16	Ana Culic	Malta	69.1990
17	Jelena Kontić	Serbia	68.1781
18	Clara Ternström	Sweden	67.1984
19	Nika Seljak	Slovenia	66.8590
20	Pinja Kekki	Finland	66.1937
