= Artistic swimming at the 2022 European Aquatics Championships – Team technical routine =

Team technical routine at the 2022 European Aquatics Championships
- Venue: Foro Italico
- Dates: 11 August
- Competitors: 62 from 8 nations
- Winning points: 92.5106

Medalists
| gold medal | Maryna Aleksiiva; Vladyslava Aleksiiva; Olesia Derevianchenko; Marta Fiedina; Veronika Hryshko; Anhelina Ovchynnikova; Anastasiia Shmonina; Valeriya Tyshchenko | Ukraine |
| silver medal | Domiziana Cavanna; Linda Cerruti; Costanza Di Camillo; Costanza Ferro; Gemma Galli; Marta Iacoacci; Marta Murru; Enrica Piccoli | Italy |
| bronze medal | Ambre Esnault; Laura Gonzalez; Mayssa Guermoud; Oriane Jaillardon; Maureen Jenkins; Romane Lunel; Eve Planeix; Charlotte Tremble | France |

The Team technical routine competition of the 2022 European Aquatics Championships was held on 11 August 2022.

== Results ==
The event was held on 11 August at 15:00.

| Rank | Nation | Swimmers | Points |
|---|---|---|---|
| 1st place, gold medalist(s) | Ukraine | Maryna Aleksiiva; Vladyslava Aleksiiva; Olesia Derevianchenko; Marta Fiedina; Veronika Hryshko; Anhelina Ovchynnikova; Anastasiia Shmonina; Valeriya Tyshchenko | 92.5106 |
| 2nd place, silver medalist(s) | Italy | Domiziana Cavanna; Linda Cerruti; Costanza Di Camillo; Costanza Ferro; Gemma Galli; Marta Iacoacci; Marta Murru; Enrica Piccoli | 90.3772 |
| 3rd place, bronze medalist(s) | France | Ambre Esnault; Laura Gonzalez; Mayssa Guermoud; Oriane Jaillardon; Maureen Jenkins; Romane Lunel; Eve Planeix; Charlotte Tremble | 88.0093 |
| 4 | Greece | Maria Alzigkouzi Kominea; Eleni Fragkaki; Krystalenia Gialama; Danai Kariori; Ifigeneia Krommydaki; Sofia Malkogeorgou; Andriana Misikevych; Maria Karapanagiotou | 87.1274 |
| 5 | Israel | Shelly Bobritsky; Maya Dorf; Noy Gazala; Catherine Kunin; Nikol Nahshonov; Ariel Nassee; Polina Prikazchikova; Shani Sharaizin | 82.9956 |
| 6 | Great Britain | Isabelle Thorpe; Kate Shortman; Daniella Lloyd; Laura Turberville; Isobel Blinkhorn; Robyn Swatman; Isobel Davies; Millicent Costello | 81.4116 |
| 7 | Switzerland | Ilona Fahrni; Emma Grosvenor; Ladina Lippuner; Milla Morel; Sofie Müntener; Babou Schupbach; Alicia Semon; Fanny Semon | 81.2375 |
| 8 | Serbia | Milica Đurašinović; Sofija Džipković; Marta Jovanović; Jelena Kontić; Deana Manojlović; Sara Stojanović | 70.1633 |
