= Artistic swimming at the 2022 World Aquatics Championships – Team technical routine =

2022 artistic swimming competition

Team technical routine at the 2022 World Aquatics Championships
- Venue: Szechy Pool
- Location: Budapest, Hungary
- Dates: 19 June (preliminary); 21 June (final)
- Competitors: 144 from 18 nations
- Teams: 18
- Winning points: 94.7202

Medalists
| gold medal | Chang Hao; Feng Yu; Wang Ciyue; Wang Liuyi; Wang Qianyi; Xiang Binxuan; Xiao Yanning; Zhang Yayi | China |
| silver medal | Moka Fujii; Moe Higa; Moeka Kijima; Tomoka Sato; Akane Yanagisawa; Mashiro Yasunaga; Megumu Yoshida; Rie Yoshida | Japan |
| bronze medal | Domiziana Cavanna; Linda Cerruti; Costanza Di Camillo; Costanza Ferro; Gemma Galli; Marta Iacoacci; Marta Murru; Enrica Piccoli | Italy |

The Team technical routine competition at the 2022 World Aquatics Championships was held on 19 and 21 June 2022.

== Results ==
The preliminary round was started on 19 June at 10:00. The final was started on 21 June at 16:00.

Green denotes finalists

| Rank | Nation | Preliminary | | Final | |
| Rank | Nation | Points | Rank | Points | Rank |
|---|---|---|---|---|---|
| 1st place, gold medalist(s) | China | 94.0039 | 1 | 94.7202 | 1 |
| 2nd place, silver medalist(s) | Japan | 91.2049 | 2 | 92.2261 | 2 |
| 3rd place, bronze medalist(s) | Italy | 89.5775 | 3 | 91.0191 | 3 |
| 4 | France | 86.4984 | 4 | 88.3558 | 4 |
| 5 | Greece | 86.2755 | 5 | 87.2261 | 5 |
| 6 | United States | 85.6085 | 6 | 86.9907 | 6 |
| 7 | Israel | 84.3848 | 8 | 84.5315 | 7 |
| 8 | Canada | 84.7752 | 7 | 84.4817 | 8 |
| 9 | Great Britain | 82.1773 | 9 | 82.5264 | 9 |
| 10 | Switzerland | 81.3767 | 10 | 81.5920 | 10 |
| 11 | Kazakhstan | 80.3196 | 11 | 81.2713 | 11 |
| 12 | Brazil | 78.4964 | 12 | 79.2419 | 12 |
| 13 | Portugal | 75.6638 | 13 | did not advance | |
| 14 | Hungary | 75.6519 | 14 | did not advance | |
| 15 | Egypt | 75.5103 | 15 | did not advance | |
| 16 | Singapore | 74.1444 | 16 | did not advance | |
| 17 | Australia | 70.5530 | 17 | did not advance | |
| 18 | Costa Rica | 64.7922 | 18 | did not advance | |
| – | Ukraine | did not start | | | |
