= Synchronised swimming at the 2018 European Aquatics Championships – Combination routine =

Combination routine at the 2018 European Aquatics Championships
- Venue: Scotstoun Sports Campus
- Dates: 5 August
- Competitors: 100 from 10 nations
- Teams: 10
- Winning points: 94.4667

Medalists
gold medal	Maryna Aleksiiva; Vladyslava Aleksiiva; Valeria Aprielieva; Marta Fiedina; Oleksandra Kashuba; Yana Nariezhna; Kateryna Reznik; Anastasiya Savchuk; Alina Shynkarenko; Yelyzaveta Yakhno; Veronika Hryshko; Oleksandra Kovalenko	Ukraine
silver medal	Beatrice Callegari; Domiziana Cavanna; Linda Cerruti; Francesca Deidda; Costanza Di Camillo; Costanza Ferro; Gemma Galli; Alessia Pezone; Enrica Piccoli; Federica Sala; Marta Murru; Francesca Zunino	Italy
bronze medal	Leyre Abadía; Abril Conesa; Berta Ferreras; Emma García; María Juárez; Meritxell Mas; Elena Melián; Paula Ramírez; Sara Saldaña; Blanca Toledano; Iris Tió	Spain

The Combination routine competition of the 2018 European Aquatics Championships was held on 5 August 2018.

== Results ==
The final was started at 13:30.

Rank	Nation	Points
1st place, gold medalist(s)	Ukraine	94.4667
2nd place, silver medalist(s)	Italy	92.6000
3rd place, bronze medalist(s)	Spain	91.4667
4	Greece	88.0667
5	Belarus	84.6333
6	Israel	83.1000
7	Great Britain	81.3667
8	Germany	80.3000
9	Austria	80.0000
10	Portugal	76.3667
