= Artistic swimming at the 2022 European Aquatics Championships – Team free routine =

Team free routine at the 2022 European Aquatics Championships
- Venue: Foro Italico
- Dates: 13 August (preliminary); 15 August (final)
- Competitors: 72 from 9 nations
- Winning points: 94.1000

Medalists
gold medal	Maryna Aleksiiva; Vladyslava Aleksiiva; Olesia Derevianchenko; Marta Fiedina; Veronika Hryshko; Anhelina Ovchynnikova; Anastasiia Shmonina; Valeriya Tyshchenko	Ukraine
silver medal	Domiziana Cavanna; Linda Cerruti; Costanza Di Camillo; Costanza Ferro; Gemma Galli; Marta Iacoacci; Francesca Zunino; Enrica Piccoli	Italy
bronze medal	Camille Bravard; Ambre Esnault; Laura Gonzalez; Mayssa Guermoud; Maureen Jenkins; Eve Planeix; Charlotte Tremble; Mathilde Vigneres	France

The Team free routine competition of the 2022 European Aquatics Championships will be held on 13 and 15 August 2022.

== Results ==
The preliminary round was held on 13 August at 09:30. The final round was held on 15 August at 15:00.

Rank	Nation	Swimmers	Preliminary		Final	
Rank	Nation	Swimmers	Points	Rank	Points	Rank
1st place, gold medalist(s)	Ukraine	Maryna Aleksiiva; Vladyslava Aleksiiva; Olesia Derevianchenko; Marta Fiedina; Veronika Hryshko; Anhelina Ovchynnikova; Anastasiia Shmonina; Valeriya Tyshchenko	94.7000	1	94.1000	1
2nd place, silver medalist(s)	Italy	Domiziana Cavanna; Linda Cerruti; Costanza Di Camillo; Costanza Ferro; Gemma Galli; Marta Iacoacci; Francesca Zunino; Enrica Piccoli	91.7333	2	92.6667	2
3rd place, bronze medalist(s)	France	Camille Bravard; Ambre Esnault; Laura Gonzalez; Mayssa Guermoud; Maureen Jenkins; Eve Planeix; Charlotte Tremble; Mathilde Vigneres	89.5000	3	90.5667	3
4	Greece	Maria Alzigkouzi Kominea; Eleni Fragkaki; Krystalenia Gialama; Danai Kariori; Ifigeneia Krommydaki; Sofia Malkogeorgou; Zoi Karangelou; Andriana Misikevych	88.0000	4	89.1333	4
5	Israel	Shelly Bobritsky; Maya Dorf; Noy Gazala; Catherine Kunin; Nikol Nahshonov; Ariel Nassee; Polina Prikazchikova; Shani Sharaizin	85.1667	5	86.0333	5
6	Germany	Thea Marta Zehentner; Jazz Li Alicja Lausch; Denise Deisner; Maria Denisov; Susana Rovner; Klara Bleyer; Marlene Bojer; Michelle Zimmer; Mia Emilia Duda-Dudynska; Solene Guisard	84.2667	6	84.6000	6
7	Great Britain	Robyn Swatman; Laura Turberville; Cerys Hugues; Daisy Gunn; Millicent Costello; Daniella Lloyd; Isobel Davies; Isobel Blinkhorn	81.8667	7	82.9333	7
8	Switzerland	Ilona Fahrni; Emma Grosvenor; Ladina Lippuner; Milla Morel; Babou Schupbach; Alicia Semon; Fanny Semon; Anna Tary	81.8333	8	82.4667	8
9	Turkey	Alara Aker; Sude Dicle; Zeynep Buse Güngör; Cansın Kütüçoğlu; Nil Deniz Senturk; Nil Talu; Selin Telci; Ece Ungor	70.5333	9	72.0667	9
