= 2024 World Aquatics Artistic Swimming Junior Championships =

International synchronised swimming competition

18th World Aquatics Artistic Swimming Junior Championships
- Host city: Lima, Peru
- Date: 28 August–1 September
- Venue: Videna Aquatic Centre

The 18th World Aquatics Artistic Swimming Junior Championships will be held from 28 August to 1 September 2024 at Videna Aquatic Centre in Lima, Peru. The competition is open to females between 15 and 19 years of age, and males between 15 and 20 years of age, inclusive, per their age at the end of the 2024 calendar year.

== Schedule ==
P	Preliminaries	F	Final

Date Event	Wed 28	Thu 29	Fri 30	Sat 31	Sun 1
Women's Solo Technical	F				
Women's Solo Free		P			F
Women's Duet Technical			F		
Women's Duet Free			P	F	
Women's Team Technical		F			
Women's Team Free				P	F
Women's Team Acrobatic		F			
Men's Solo Technical	F				
Men's Solo Free			F		
Mixed Duet Technical		F			
Mixed Duet Free				F	

== Results ==
=== Women ===
Event	Gold		Silver		Bronze	
Solo technical	Xu Huiyan; China	281.8533	Marloes Steenbeek; Netherlands	273.5599	Sakurako Uchida; Japan	270.7017
Solo free	Zoi Karangelou; Greece	283.2958	Marloes Steenbeek; Netherlands	283.1460	Xu Huiyan; China	282.0334
Duet technical	Japan; Risako Mitsuhashi; Sakurako Uchida	282.2267	Ukraine; Daria Moshynska; Anastasiia Shmonina	281.4283	Spain; Naia Alvarez Vicente; Rocío Calle García	270.0083
Duet free	Ukraine; Daria Moshynska; Anastasiia Shmonina	294.6001	China; Xu Huiyan; Zhang Wanyi	290.7793	Spain; Naia Alvarez Vicente; Rocío Calle García	276.5147
Team technical	China	305.3328	Japan	303.8268	Spain	299.3034
Team free	China	387.4418	Japan	375.2146	Spain	347.9065
Team acrobatic	United States	233.1699	Mexico	233.0467	China	232.5300

=== Men ===
Event	Gold		Silver		Bronze	
Solo technical	Diego Villalobos Carrillo; Mexico	258.5516	Guo Muye; China	257.8783	Nicolás Campos; Chile	251.1600
Solo free	Diego Villalobos Carrillo; Mexico	255.0521	Nicolás Campos; Chile	253.5354	Guo Muye; China	253.0042

=== Mixed ===
Event	Gold		Silver		Bronze	
Duet technical	China; Guo Muye; Guo Sitong	274.6433	Mexico; Camila Argumedo Gomez; Diego Villalobos Carrillo	267.8083	Italy; Filippo Pelati; Sarah Maria Rizea	260.3166
Duet free	Mexico; Camila Argumedo Gomez; Diego Villalobos Carrillo	270.4042	China; Guo Muye; Zhou Kunyi	264.8729	Spain; Ariadna Benito; Jordi Caceres Iglesias	251.8313

== Medal table ==
* Host nation (Peru)

Rank	Nation	Gold	Silver	Bronze	Total
1	China	4	3	3	10
2	Mexico	3	2	0	5
3	Japan	1	2	1	4
4	Ukraine	1	1	0	2
5	Greece	1	0	0	1
5	United States	1	0	0	1
7	Netherlands	0	2	0	2
8	Chile	0	1	1	2
9	Spain	0	0	5	5
10	Italy	0	0	1	1
Totals (10 entries)		11	11	11	33
