= Anna Nosova =

Ukrainian synchronized swimmer

Personal information
- Nationality: Ukrainian
- Born: 22 December 2001 (age 24)

Sport
- Sport: Swimming
- Strokes: Artistic swimming
Medal record
Women's artistic swimming
Representing Ukraine
European Championships
Gold medal – first place	2020 Budapest	Highlights routine

Anna Nosova (Ukrainian: Анна Носова; born 22 December 2001) is a Ukrainian artistic swimmer. She is the 2020 European Championships champion in highlights routine.
