= Artistic swimming at the 2023 European Games – Team acrobatic routine =

Team acrobatic at the 2023 European Games
- Venue: Oswiecim
- Dates: 23 June
- Competitors: 56 from 7 nations
- Winning points: 214.2833

Medalists
| gold medal | Anastasia Bayandina; Ambre Esnault; Mayssa Guermoud; Claudia Janvier; Romane Lunel; Eve Planeix; Charlotte Tremble; Laura Tremble | France |
| silver medal | Maryna Aleksiiva; Vladyslava Aleksiiva; Marta Fiedina; Veronika Hryshko; Daria Moshynska; Anhelina Ovchynnikova; Anastasiia Shmonina; Valeriya Tyshchenko | Ukraine |
| bronze medal | Linda Cerruti; Marta Iacoacci; Sofia Mastroianni; Giorgio Minisini; Enrica Piccoli; Carmen Rocchino; Isotta Sportelli; Francesca Zunino | Italy |

The team acrobatic routine competition of the 2023 European Games was held on 23 June 2023 in Oswiecim, Poland. For the first time male competitors took part in the sport at this level.

== Final ==
All seven entered teams competed in the final. There was no preliminary round.

| Rank | Nation | D | E | A | P | Total |
|---|---|---|---|---|---|---|
| 1st place, gold medalist(s) | France: Anastasia Bayandina; Mayssa Guermoud; Romane Lunel; Charlotte Tremble; Ambre Esnault; Claudia Janvier; Eve Planeix; Laura Tremble | 18.650 | 125.7833 | 88.5000 | -3.1 | 214.2833 |
| 2nd place, silver medalist(s) | Ukraine: Maryna Aleksiyiva; Marta Fiedina; Daria Moshynska; Anastasiia Shmonina; Vladyslava Aleksiyiva; Veronika Hryshko; Anhelina Ovchynnikova; Valeriya Tyshchenko | 17.550 | 120.3800 | 88.6000 | -3.2 | 208.9800 |
| 3rd place, bronze medalist(s) | Italy: Linda Cerruti; Sofia Mastroianni; Enrica Piccoli; Isotta Sportelli; Marta Iacoacci; Giorgio Minisini; Carmen Rocchino; Francesca Zunino | 17.850 | 116.6400 | 85.3500 | -3.4 | 201.9900 |
| 4 | Israel: Eden Blecher; Maya Dorf; Nikol Nahshonov; Neta Rubichek; Shelly Bobritsky; Catherine Kunin; Ariel Nassee; Shani Sharaizin | 15.900 | 98.4000 | 81.0000 | -2.8 | 179.4000 |
| 5 | Great Britain: Eleanor Blinkhorn; Millicent Costello; Cerys Hughes; Daniella Lloyd; Isobel Blinkhorn; Isobel Davies; Aimee Laurence; Robyn Swatman | 15.600 | 92.8533 | 75.8000 | -4.0 | 168.6533 |
| 6 | Hungary: Léna Fábos; Szabina Hungler; Réka Márialigeti; Blanka Taksonyi; Lilien Götz; Kira Kecskés; Léna Szórát; Roxána Uy | 15.800 | 93.8034 | 74.4500 | -5.3 | 168.2534 |
| 7 | Portugal: Lara Botelho; Inês Dubini; Carlota Fonseca; Marta Moreira; Anna Carvalho; Filipa Faria; Beatriz Gama; Mariana Rocha | 14.800 | 84.7400 | 72.1000 | -6.6 | 155.8400 |
