= Artistic swimming at the 2020 European Aquatics Championships – Highlights routine =

Highlights routine at the 2020 European Aquatics Championships
- Venue: Danube Arena
- Dates: 15 May 2021
- Competitors: 30 from 3 nations
- Teams: 3
- Winning points: 95.3000

Medalists
gold medal	Maryna Aleksiiva; Vladyslava Aleksiiva; Marta Fiedina; Veronika Hryshko; Anna Nosova; Kateryna Reznik; Anastasiya Savchuk; Alina Shynkarenko; Kseniya Sydorenko; Yelyzaveta Yakhno	Ukraine
silver medal	Vera Butsel; Marharyta Kiryliuk; Hanna Koutsun; Yana Kudzina; Kseniya Kuliashova; Anastasiya Navasiolava; Valeryia Puz; Anastasiya Suvalava; Kseniya Tratseuskaya; Aliaksandra Vysotskaya	Belarus
bronze medal	Niké Barta; Katalin Csilling; Linda Farkas; Boglárka Gács; Lilien Götz; Hanna Hatala; Szabina Hungler; Adelin Regényi; Luca Rényi; Anna Viktória Szabó	Hungary

The Highlights routine competition of the 2020 European Aquatics Championships was held on 15 May 2021.

It was the first time the highlights routine was contested at a LEN European Aquatics Championships.

== Results ==
The final was held at 09:00.

Rank	Nation	Swimmers	Points
1st place, gold medalist(s)	Ukraine	Maryna Aleksiiva; Vladyslava Aleksiiva; Marta Fiedina; Veronika Hryshko; Anna Nosova; Kateryna Reznik; Anastasiya Savchuk; Alina Shynkarenko; Kseniya Sydorenko; Yelyzaveta Yakhno	95.3000
2nd place, silver medalist(s)	Belarus	Vera Butsel; Marharyta Kiryliuk; Hanna Koutsun; Yana Kudzina; Kseniya Kuliashova; Anastasiya Navasiolava; Valeryia Puz; Anastasiya Suvalava; Kseniya Tratseuskaya; Aliaksandra Vysotskaya	86.5667
3rd place, bronze medalist(s)	Hungary	Niké Barta; Katalin Csilling; Linda Farkas; Boglárka Gács; Lilien Götz; Hanna Hatala; Szabina Hungler; Adelin Regényi; Luca Rényi; Anna Viktória Szabó	79.1000
