= Linda Cerruti =

Italian synchronized swimmer

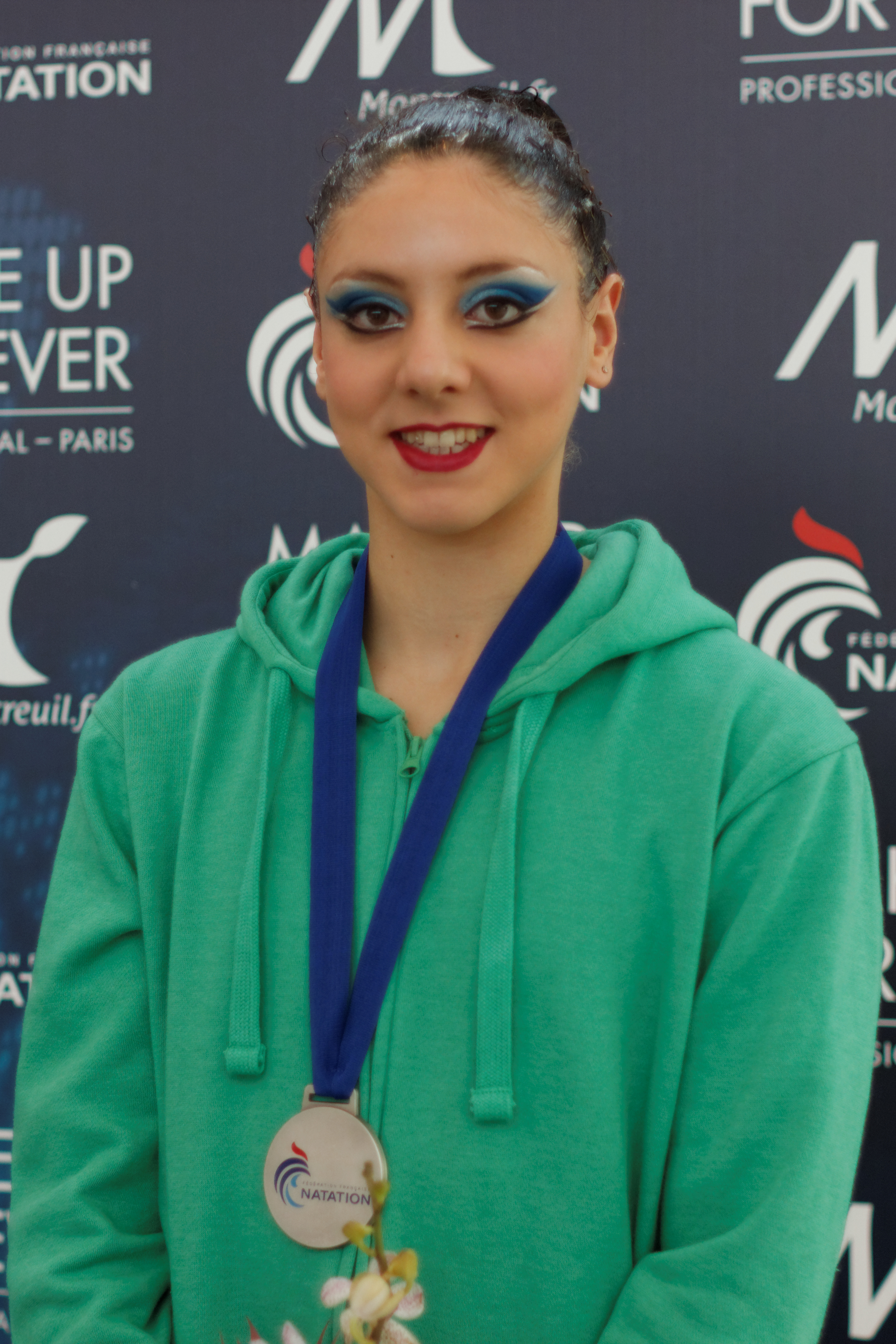
- Cerruti in March 2013

Personal information
- Nationality: Italian
- Born: 7 October 1993 (age 32) Savona, Italy
- Height: 1.73 m (5 ft 8 in)
- Weight: 56 kg (123 lb)

Sport
- Sport: Swimming
- Strokes: Synchronised swimming
- Club: G.S. Marina Militare
- Coach: Anastasiya Yermakova
Medal record
Women's artistic swimming
Representing Italy
Event	1st	2nd	3rd
World Championships	0	4	2
European Championships	0	9	14
European Games	0	2	1
Total	0	15	17
World Championships
Silver medal – second place	2019 Gwangju	Highlight routine
Silver medal – second place	2022 Budapest	Highlight routine
Silver medal – second place	2023 Fukuoka	Duet technical routine
Silver medal – second place	2023 Fukuoka	Team technical routine
Bronze medal – third place	2022 Budapest	Free routine combination
Bronze medal – third place	2022 Budapest	Team technical routine
European Games
Silver medal – second place	2023 Kraków-Małopolska	Team free routine
Silver medal – second place	2023 Kraków-Małopolska	Team technical routine
Bronze medal – third place	2023 Kraków-Małopolska	Team acrobatic routine
European Championships
Silver medal – second place	2016 London	Team free routine
Silver medal – second place	2018 Glasgow	Solo free routine
Silver medal – second place	2018 Glasgow	Free routine combination
Silver medal – second place	2022 Rome	Solo free routine
Silver medal – second place	2022 Rome	Solo technical routine
Silver medal – second place	2022 Rome	Team free routine
Silver medal – second place	2022 Rome	Team technical routine
Silver medal – second place	2022 Rome	Free routine combination
Silver medal – second place	2022 Rome	Highlights routine
Bronze medal – third place	2014 Berlin	Free routine combination
Bronze medal – third place	2016 London	Solo free routine
Bronze medal – third place	2016 London	Solo technical routine
Bronze medal – third place	2016 London	Duet free routine
Bronze medal – third place	2016 London	Duet technical routine
Bronze medal – third place	2016 London	Team technical routine
Bronze medal – third place	2016 London	Free routine combination
Bronze medal – third place	2018 Glasgow	Solo technical routine
Bronze medal – third place	2018 Glasgow	Duet free routine
Bronze medal – third place	2018 Glasgow	Duet technical routine
Bronze medal – third place	2018 Glasgow	Team free routine
Bronze medal – third place	2018 Glasgow	Team technical routine
Bronze medal – third place	2022 Rome	Duet free routine
Bronze medal – third place	2022 Rome	Duet technical routine

Linda Cerruti (born 7 October 1993) is an Italian competitor in synchronised swimming who competed at the 2011 World Aquatics Championships, 2013 World Aquatics Championships, 2010 European Aquatics Championships, 2012 European Aquatics Championships. and in Duet at the 2020 Summer Olympics. She also competed at the 2022 World Aquatics Championships in Budapest, Hungary and at the 2022 European Aquatics Championships in Rome, Italy.

== Background ==
Cerruti is an athlete of the Gruppo Sportivo della Marina Militare.

== Career ==
=== 2022 European Aquatics Championships ===
On the second day of artistic swimming at the 2022 European Aquatics Championships, held in Rome in August, she won her first medal of the day, a silver medal in the solo technical routine, with a score of 90.8839 points. Later in the day, she won a silver medal in the highlights routine, helping achieve a score of 91.7000 points. One day earlier, she won her first silver medal as part of the team technical routine with a score of 90.3772 points. The third day, she won a bronze medal in the duet free routine, scoring 91.7000 points with her partner Costanza Ferro. On day four, she won the silver medal in the solo free routine with a score of 92.1000 points. Later in the day, she won a sixth medal, a silver medal as part of the team in the free combination routine, helping achieve a score of 92.6667 points. The fifth and final day, she and Costanza Ferro won the bronze medal in the duet technical routine with a score of 90.3577 points. For her eighth and final medal, she won a silver medal in the team free routine with a final score of 92.6667 points.
