= Meritxell Mas =

Spanish synchronized swimmer

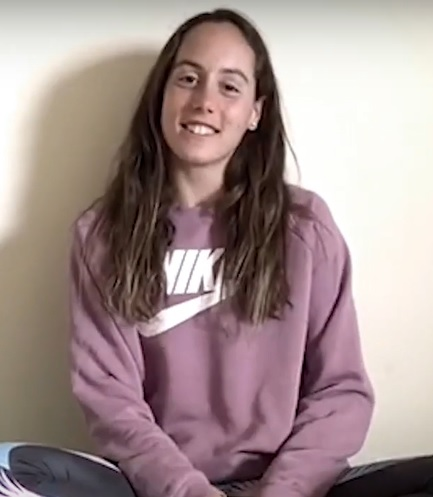
- Mas in 2020

Personal information
- Full name: Meritxell Mas Pujadas
- National team: Spain
- Born: 25 December 1994 (age 31) Granollers, Spain
- Height: 1.70 m (5 ft 7 in)
- Weight: 55 kg (121 lb)

Sport
- Sport: Swimming
- Strokes: Synchronised swimming
- Club: CN Les Franqueses
Medal record
Women's artistic swimming
Representing Spain
Event	1st	2nd	3rd
Olympic Games	0	0	1
World Championships	1	4	3
European Championships	1	1	4
European Games	2	0	0
Total	4	5	8
Olympic Games
Bronze medal – third place	2024 Paris	Team
World Championships
Gold medal – first place	2023 Fukuoka	Team technical routine
Silver medal – second place	2013 Barcelona	Team technical routine
Silver medal – second place	2013 Barcelona	Team free routine
Silver medal – second place	2013 Barcelona	Free routine combination
Silver medal – second place	2024 Doha	Team technical routine
Bronze medal – third place	2019 Gwangju	Highlight routine
Bronze medal – third place	2022 Budapest	Highlight routine
Bronze medal – third place	2025 Singapore	Team acrobatic routine
European Games
Gold medal – first place	2023 Kraków-Małopolska	Team free routine
Gold medal – first place	2023 Kraków-Małopolska	Team technical routine
European Championships
Gold medal – first place	2024 Belgrade	Team technical routine
Silver medal – second place	2014 Berlin	Free routine combination
Bronze medal – third place	2014 Berlin	Team Routine
Bronze medal – third place	2016 London	Team free routine
Bronze medal – third place	2018 Glasgow	Free routine combination
Bronze medal – third place	2020 Budapest	Team technical routine

Meritxell Mas Pujadas (born 25 December 1994) is a Spanish competitor in synchronised swimming.

She won 3 silver medals at the 2013 World Aquatics Championships. She also won a silver and a bronze at the 2014 European Aquatics Championships.
