= Blanca Toledano =

Spanish synchronised swimmer (born 2000)

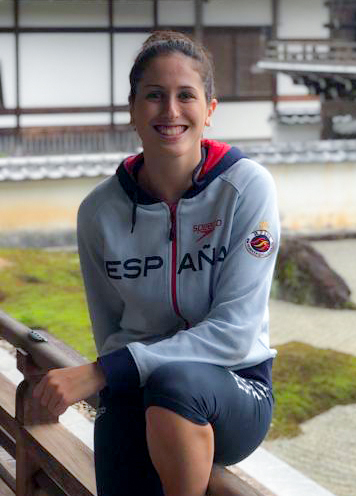
- Toledano in 2019

Personal information
- Full name: Blanca Toledano Laut
- Nationality: Spanish
- Born: 3 November 2000 (age 25) Madrid, Spain
- Height: 1.71 m (5 ft 7 in)
- Weight: 57 kg (126 lb)

Sport
- Country: Spain
- Sport: Synchronised swimming
Medal record
Women's artistic swimming
Representing Spain
Event	1st	2nd	3rd
Olympic Games	0	0	1
World Championships	1	1	2
European Championships	1	0	2
European Games	2	0	0
Total	4	1	5
Olympic Games
Bronze medal – third place	2024 Paris	Team
World Championships
Gold medal – first place	2023 Fukuoka	Team technical routine
Silver medal – second place	2024 Doha	Team technical routine
Bronze medal – third place	2019 Gwangju	Highlight routine
Bronze medal – third place	2022 Budapest	Highlight routine
European Games
Gold medal – first place	2023 Kraków-Małopolska	Team free routine
Gold medal – first place	2023 Kraków-Małopolska	Team technical routine
European Championships
Gold medal – first place	2024 Belgrade	Team technical routine
Bronze medal – third place	2018 Glasgow	Free routine combination
Bronze medal – third place	2020 Budapest	Team technical routine

Blanca Toledano Laut (born 3 November 2000) is a Spanish synchronised swimmer.

She won a bronze medal in the free routine combination competition at the 2018 European Aquatics Championships.
