= Costanza Ferro =

Italian synchronized swimmer

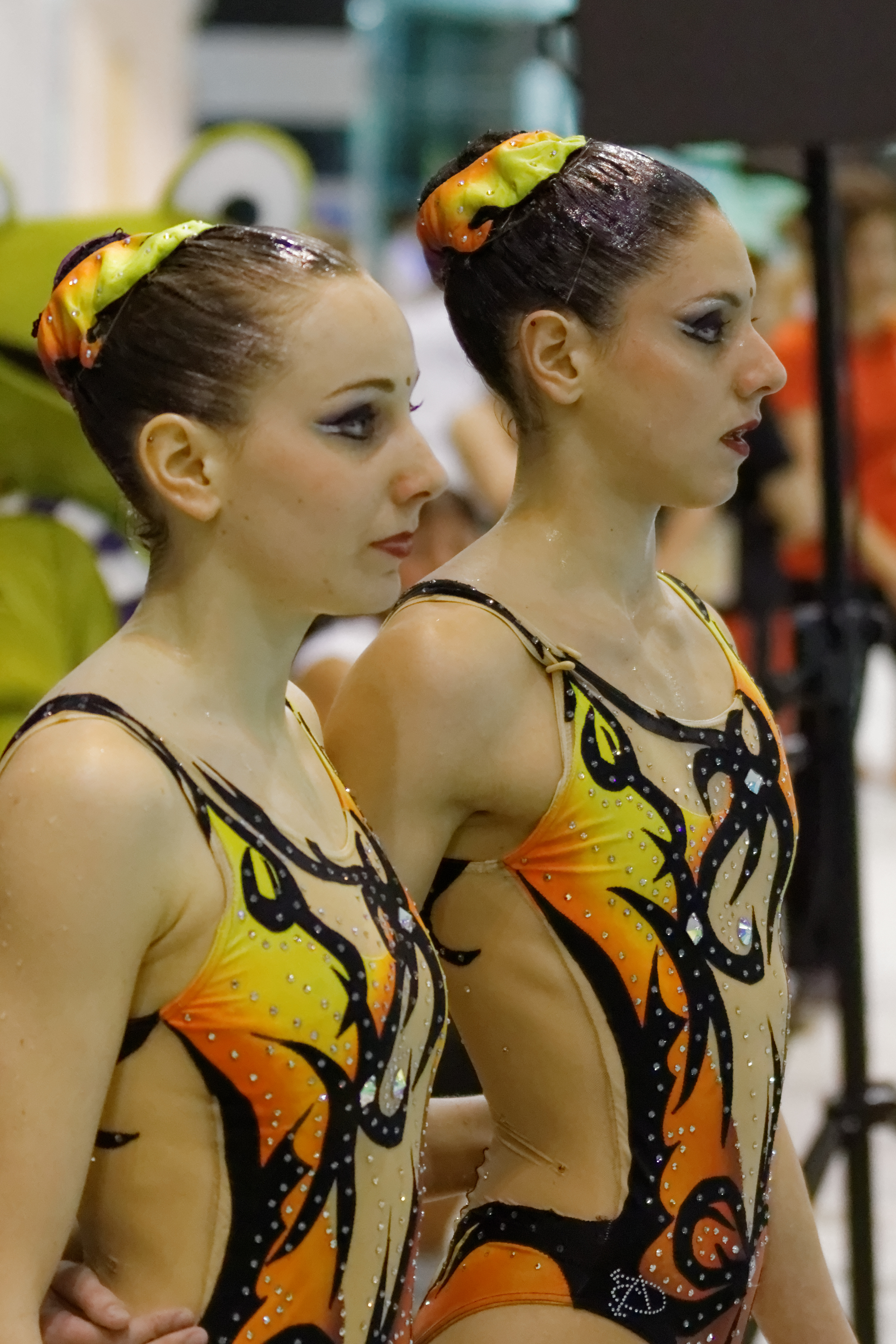
- Costanza Ferro (left) with Linda Cerruti (right)

Personal information
- Born: 5 July 1993 (age 33) Genoa, Italy
- Height: 1.69 m (5 ft 7 in)
- Weight: 56 kg (123 lb)

Sport
- Country: Italy
- Sport: Synchronized swimming
- Club: Rari Nantes Savona; G.S. Marina Militare
Medal record
Women's artistic swimming
Representing Italy
World Championships
Silver medal – second place	2019 Gwangju	Highlight routine
Silver medal – second place	2022 Budapest	Highlight routine
Bronze medal – third place	2022 Budapest	Free routine combination
Bronze medal – third place	2022 Budapest	Team technical routine
European Championships
Silver medal – second place	2018 Glasgow	Free routine combination
Silver medal – second place	2022 Rome	Team free routine
Silver medal – second place	2022 Rome	Team technical routine
Silver medal – second place	2022 Rome	Combination routine
Silver medal – second place	2022 Rome	Highlights routine
Bronze medal – third place	2018 Glasgow	Duet free routine
Bronze medal – third place	2018 Glasgow	Duet technical routine
Bronze medal – third place	2018 Glasgow	Team free routine
Bronze medal – third place	2018 Glasgow	Team technical routine
Bronze medal – third place	2022 Rome	Duet free routine
Bronze medal – third place	2022 Rome	Duet technical routine

Costanza Ferro (born 5 July 1993) is an Italian synchronized swimmer. She competed in the women's duet at the 2016 Summer Olympics. and Duet at the 2020 Summer Olympics.

Ferro is an athlete of the Gruppo Sportivo della Marina Militare,
