= Olesia Derevianchenko =

Ukrainian synchronised swimmer

Personal information
- Nationality: Ukrainian
- Born: 13 March 2002 (age 24)

Sport
- Sport: Swimming
- Strokes: Artistic swimming
Medal record
Women's artistic swimming
Representing Ukraine
Event	1st	2nd	3rd
World Championships	2	1	0
European Championships	5	0	0
European Games	0	1	0
World Junior Championships	0	2	0
European Junior Championships	1	12	1
Total	8	16	1
World Championships
Gold medal – first place	2022 Budapest	Free routine combination
Gold medal – first place	2022 Budapest	Highlight routine
Silver medal – second place	2022 Budapest	Team free routine
European Championships
Gold medal – first place	2020 Budapest	Combination routine
Gold medal – first place	2022 Rome	Team free routine
Gold medal – first place	2022 Rome	Team technical routine
Gold medal – first place	2022 Rome	Combination routine
Gold medal – first place	2022 Rome	Highlights routine
European Games
Silver medal – second place	2023 Kraków-Małopolska	Team acrobatic routine
World Junior Championships
Silver medal – second place	2018 Budapest	Team free routine
Silver medal – second place	2018 Budapest	Team technical routine
European Junior Championships
Gold medal – first place	2021 Valletta	Highlights routine
Silver medal – second place	2018 Tampere	Team technical routine
Silver medal – second place	2018 Tampere	Team free routine
Silver medal – second place	2018 Tampere	Free routine combination
Silver medal – second place	2019 Prague	Team free routine
Silver medal – second place	2019 Prague	Team technical routine
Silver medal – second place	2019 Prague	Duet technical routine
Silver medal – second place	2019 Prague	Duet free routine
Silver medal – second place	2021 Valletta	Team free routine
Silver medal – second place	2021 Valletta	Team technical routine
Silver medal – second place	2021 Valletta	Free routine combination
Silver medal – second place	2021 Valletta	Duet technical routine
Silver medal – second place	2021 Valletta	Duet free routine
Bronze medal – third place	2019 Prague	Free routine combination

Olesia Derevianchenko (Ukrainian: Олеся Дерев’янченко; born 13 March 2002) is a Ukrainian artistic swimmer. She is 2020 European Championships champion in combination.
