= 2018 FINA World Junior Artistic Swimming Championships =

Swimming competition

16th FINA World Junior Artistic Swimming Championships
- Host city: Budapest, Hungary
- Date: 18–22 July
- Venue: Danube Arena

The 16th FINA World Junior Artistic Swimming Championships was held from 18 to 22 July 2018 at Danube Arena in Budapest, Hungary. It was the first World Junior Championships following the renaming of the sport from synchronized swimming to artistic swimming to reflect the incorporation of evaluation criteria emphasizing choreography and artistic expression, in addition to synchronization, and was the first to use the name World Junior Artistic Swimming Championships at the time of competition.

This 2018 edition also marked the first time men were allowed to compete at any edition of the Championships, with a mixed gender duet debuted that featured one male and one female swimmer per duo.

== Results ==
=== Women ===
Event	Gold		Silver		Bronze	
Solo technical	Varvara Subbotina; Russia	92.6551	Marta Fiedina; Ukraine	88.6030	Mana Fujiwara; Japan	87.9752
Solo free	Varvara Subbotina; Russia	93.5667	Marta Fiedina; Ukraine	90.7667	Mana Fujiwara; Japan	88.3333
Duet technical	Russia; Kseniia Ladnaia; Elizaveta Minaeva	91.6280	Ukraine; Maryna Aleksiyiva; Vladyslava Aleksiyiva	89.9301	China; Liu Jin Han; Liu Jin Tong	87.5172
Duet free	Russia; Kseniia Ladnaia; Elizaveta Minaeva	93.1000	Ukraine; Maryna Aleksiyiva; Vladyslava Aleksiyiva	91.0333	Japan; Mana Fujiwara; Ami Wada	89.1333
Team technical	Russia	92.7347	Ukraine	90.3331	Japan	89.0176
Team free	Russia	93.6667	Ukraine	91.8000	Japan	90.5667
Team free combination	Russia	94.2333	Ukraine	92.1000	Japan	90.5333

=== Mixed ===
Event	Gold		Silver		Bronze	
Duet technical	Russia; Alina Mantulenko; Mikhail Vasilev	83.6404	China; Shi Haoyu; Zhang Yiyao	79.3538	Japan; Jimma Iwasaki; Kana Miyauchi	78.7287
Duet free	Russia; Alina Mantulenko; Mikhail Vasilev	85.1333	China; Shi Haoyu; Zhang Yiyao	81.4667	Japan; Jimma Iwasaki; Kana Miyauchi	80.7667

== Medal table ==
* Host nation (Hungary)

Rank	Nation	Gold	Silver	Bronze	Total
1	Russia	9	0	0	9
2	Ukraine	0	7	0	7
3	China	0	2	1	3
4	Japan	0	0	8	8
Totals (4 entries)		9	9	9	27
