= Gemma Galli =

Italian synchronized swimmer

Personal information
- Nationality: Italian
- Born: 13 July 1996 (age 29) Melzo, Italy

Sport
- Country: Italy
- Sport: Synchronised swimming
- Club: G.S. Marina Militare
Medal record
Women's artistic swimming
Representing Italy
World Championships
Silver medal – second place	2019 Gwangju	Highlight routine
Silver medal – second place	2022 Budapest	Highlight routine
Bronze medal – third place	2022 Budapest	Free routine combination
Bronze medal – third place	2022 Budapest	Team technical routine
European Championships
Silver medal – second place	2018 Glasgow	Free routine combination
Silver medal – second place	2022 Rome	Team free routine
Silver medal – second place	2022 Rome	Team technical routine
Silver medal – second place	2022 Rome	Combination routine
Silver medal – second place	2022 Rome	Highlights routine
Bronze medal – third place	2018 Glasgow	Team free routine
Bronze medal – third place	2018 Glasgow	Team technical routine

Gemma Galli (born 13 July 1996) is an Italian synchronised swimmer. She competed in Team at the 2020 Summer Olympics.

Galli is an athlete of the Gruppo Sportivo della Marina Militare,

== Biography ==
She won a bronze medal in the team free routine competition at the 2018 European Aquatics Championships.
