= Francesca Zunino =

Italian synchronized swimmer

Personal information
- Nationality: Italian
- Born: 13 February 2000 (age 26)
- Height: 1.76 m (5 ft 9 in)

Sport
- Country: Italy
- Sport: Synchronised swimming
Medal record
Women's artistic swimming
Representing Italy
Event	1st	2nd	3rd
World Championships	0	2	1
European Championships	0	4	0
European Games	0	2	1
Total	0	8	2
World Championships
Silver medal – second place	2022 Budapest	Highlight routine
Silver medal – second place	2023 Fukuoka	Team technical routine
Bronze medal – third place	2022 Budapest	Free routine combination
European Games
Silver medal – second place	2023 Kraków-Małopolska	Team free routine
Silver medal – second place	2023 Kraków-Małopolska	Team technical routine
Bronze medal – third place	2023 Kraków-Małopolska	Team acrobatic routine
European Championships
Silver medal – second place	2018 Glasgow	Free routine combination
Silver medal – second place	2022 Rome	Team free routine
Silver medal – second place	2022 Rome	Combination routine
Silver medal – second place	2022 Rome	Highlights routine

Francesca Zunino (born 13 February 2000) is an Italian synchronised swimmer.

She won a silver medal in the free routine combination competition at the 2018 European Aquatics Championships.
