= Enrica Piccoli =

Italian synchronized swimmer (born 1999)

Personal information
- Nationality: Italian
- Born: 19 January 1999 (age 27) Castelfranco Veneto, Italy

Sport
- Country: Italy
- Sport: Synchronised swimming
Medal record
Women's artistic swimming
Representing Italy
Event	1st	2nd	3rd
World Championships	0	4	2
European Championships	1	6	2
European Games	0	2	1
Total	1	12	5
World Championships
Silver medal – second place	2019 Gwangju	Highlight routine
Silver medal – second place	2022 Budapest	Highlight routine
Silver medal – second place	2023 Fukuoka	Team technical routine
Silver medal – second place	2025 Singapore	Duet free routine
Bronze medal – third place	2022 Budapest	Free routine combination
Bronze medal – third place	2022 Budapest	Team technical routine
European Games
Silver medal – second place	2023 Kraków-Małopolska	Team free routine
Silver medal – second place	2023 Kraków-Małopolska	Team technical routine
Bronze medal – third place	2023 Kraków-Małopolska	Team acrobatic routine
European Championships
Gold medal – first place	2025 Funchal	Duet free routine
Silver medal – second place	2018 Glasgow	Free routine combination
Silver medal – second place	2022 Rome	Team free routine
Silver medal – second place	2022 Rome	Team technical routine
Silver medal – second place	2022 Rome	Combination routine
Silver medal – second place	2022 Rome	Highlights routine
Silver medal – second place	2025 Funchal	Solo free routine
Bronze medal – third place	2018 Glasgow	Team free routine
Bronze medal – third place	2018 Glasgow	Team technical routine

Enrica Piccoli (born 19 January 1999) is an Italian synchronised swimmer. She competed in Team at the 2020 Summer Olympics.

She won a bronze medal in the team free routine competition at the 2018 European Aquatics Championships.

At the 2022 European Aquatics Championships, contested in Rome in August, Piccoli won a silver medal in the team technical routine on day one, helping achieve a final mark of 90.3772 points.
