= Costanza Di Camillo =

Italian synchronized swimmer

Personal information
- Nationality: Italian
- Born: 25 January 1995 (age 31) Rome, Italy
- Height: 1.77 m (5 ft 10 in)
- Weight: 56 kg (123 lb)

Sport
- Country: Italy
- Sport: Synchronised swimming
Medal record
Women's artistic swimming
Representing Italy
World Championships
Silver medal – second place	2019 Gwangju	Highlight routine
Bronze medal – third place	2022 Budapest	Team technical routine
European Championships
Silver medal – second place	2016 London	Team free routine
Silver medal – second place	2018 Glasgow	Free routine combination
Silver medal – second place	2022 Rome	Team free routine
Silver medal – second place	2022 Rome	Team technical routine
Silver medal – second place	2022 Rome	Combination routine
Silver medal – second place	2022 Rome	Highlights routine
Bronze medal – third place	2018 Glasgow	Team free routine
Bronze medal – third place	2018 Glasgow	Team technical routine

Costanza Di Camillo (born 25 January 1995) is an Italian synchronised swimmer. She competed in Team at the 2020 Summer Olympics.

She won a bronze medal at the 2018 European Championships, and before a silver medal at the 2016 European Aquatics Championships.

Di Camillo is an athlete of the Gruppo Sportivo della Marina Militare,
