= Eve Planeix =

French synchronized swimmer

Personal information
- Born: 20 December 2000 (age 25)

Sport
- Sport: Swimming
- Strokes: Synchronized swimming
Medal record
Women's artistic swimming
Representing France
European Championships (LC)
Bronze medal – third place	2022 Rome	Team free routine
Bronze medal – third place	2022 Rome	Team technical routine
Bronze medal – third place	2022 Rome	Highlights routine

Eve Planeix (born 20 December 2000) is a French synchronized swimmer. She represented France at the 2017 World Aquatics Championships in Budapest, Hungary and at the 2019 World Aquatics Championships in Gwangju, South Korea. At the 2019 World Aquatics Championships she finished in 9th place in the solo free routine. She also competed in the solo free routine at the 2022 World Aquatics Championships held in Budapest, Hungary.
