= 2022 European Aquatics Championships =

Water sport competitions

36th European Aquatics Championships
- Host city: Rome, Italy
- Date: 11–21 August 2022
- Venue(s): Foro Italico (swimming, diving, artistic swimming); Ostia (open water swimming)
- Website: www.roma2022.eu/en/

The 2022 European Aquatics Championships took place in Rome, Italy, from 11 to 21 August 2022. The event exactly coincided with, but was not officially part of, the 2022 European Championships. This diverged from the joined format of the 2018 edition, which was held as part of the inaugural 2018 European Championships.

== Schedule ==
A total of 77 medal events were held across 5 disciplines. Competition dates by discipline are:

- Swimming: 11–17 August
- Open water swimming: 20–21 August
- Artistic swimming: 11–15 August
- Diving: 15–21 August
- High diving: 18–20 August

●	Finals

August	11	12	13	14	15	16	17	18	19	20	21	Total
Swimming	3	6	7	5	6	7	9					43
Open water swimming										4	3	7
Artistic swimming	1	3	2	3	3							12
Diving					1	2	2	2	2	2	2	13
High diving									1	1		2
Total	4	9	9	8	10	9	11	2	3	7	5	77
Cumulative Total	4	13	22	30	40	49	60	62	65	72	77	77

== Overall medal table ==
After all 77 events.
‡ The two events previously cancelled are restored and reassigned.

* Host nation (Italy)

Rank	Nation	Gold	Silver	Bronze	Total
1	Italy*	25	26	21	72
2	Great Britain	10	8	9	27
3	Ukraine	10	6	1	17
4	Germany	6	2	7	15
5	Hungary	5	8	3	16
6	Netherlands	5	1	6	12
7	France	4	8	10	22
8	Sweden	4	2	2	8
9	Romania	3	1	0	4
10	Switzerland	1	4	0	5
11	Greece	1	1	2	4
12	Lithuania	1	0	3	4
13	Bosnia and Herzegovina	1	0	1	2
14	Israel	1	0	0	1
15	Spain	0	5	0	5
16	Austria	0	2	4	6
17	Poland	0	1	1	2
18	Denmark	0	1	0	1
18	Finland	0	1	0	1
20	Portugal	0	0	3	3
21	Slovakia	0	0	2	2
22	Serbia	0	0	1	1
22	Turkey	0	0	1	1
Totals (23 entries)		77	77	77	231

== Team trophy ==
Results:

=== Swimming (50 m) ===
Rank	Team	Points
1	Italy	1190
2	France	641
3	Great Britain	622
4	Hungary	586
5	Netherlands	504
6	Germany	426
7	Poland	406
8	Sweden	316
9	Spain	306
10	Switzerland	235

=== Open water swimming ===
Rank	Team	Points
1	Italy	210
2	France	175
3	Germany	131
4	Hungary	123
5	Spain	71
6	Netherlands	62
7	Portugal	52
8	Czech Republic	51
9	Israel	29
10	Greece	13

=== Artistic swimming ===
Rank	Team	Points
1	Italy	1504
2	Ukraine	1152
3	Greece	898
4	Great Britain	844
5	Israel	798
6	France	746
7	Serbia	660
8	Germany	603
9	Switzerland	544
10	Hungary	484

=== Diving ===
Rank	Team	Points
1	Great Britain	185
2	Italy	180
3	Germany	140
4	Ukraine	124
5	Switzerland	57
6	Sweden	52
7	France	38
8	Spain	36
9	Ireland	20
10	Greece	17

=== High diving ===
Rank	Team	Points
1	Italy	29
2	Romania	24
3	Germany	22
4	Ukraine	19
5	Spain	15
6	France	9
6	Great Britain	9
8	Netherlands	8
9	Denmark	7
10	Czech Republic	5

== Swimming ==
=== Medal table ===
After all 43 events.

* Host nation (Italy)

Rank	Nation	Gold	Silver	Bronze	Total
1	Italy*	13	13	9	35
2	Hungary	5	7	3	15
3	Great Britain	4	5	6	15
4	Netherlands	4	1	6	11
5	Sweden	4	1	1	6
6	France	3	7	3	13
7	Germany	2	2	4	8
8	Romania	2	0	0	2
9	Switzerland	1	3	0	4
10	Greece	1	1	1	3
11	Lithuania	1	0	3	4
12	Bosnia and Herzegovina	1	0	1	2
13	Israel	1	0	0	1
13	Ukraine	1	0	0	1
15	Poland	0	1	1	2
16	Denmark	0	1	0	1
16	Finland	0	1	0	1
18	Austria	0	0	2	2
18	Portugal	0	0	2	2
20	Turkey	0	0	1	1
Totals (20 entries)		43	43	43	129

=== Men ===
Event	Gold		Silver		Bronze	
50 m freestyle	Ben Proud; Great Britain	21.58	Leonardo Deplano; Italy	21.60	Kristian Gkolomeev; Greece	21.75
100 m freestyle	David Popovici; Romania	46.86; WR	Kristóf Milák; Hungary	47.47; NR	Alessandro Miressi; Italy	47.63
200 m freestyle	David Popovici; Romania	1:42.97; WJ, CR, NR	Antonio Djakovic; Switzerland	1:45.60	Felix Auböck; Austria	1:45.89
400 m freestyle	Lukas Märtens; Germany	3:42.50; CR	Antonio Djakovic; Switzerland	3:43.93 NR	Henning Mühlleitner; Germany	3:44.53
800 m freestyle	Gregorio Paltrinieri; Italy	7:40.86; CR	Lukas Märtens; Germany	7:42.65	Lorenzo Galossi; Italy	7:43.37; WJ
1500 m freestyle	Mykhailo Romanchuk; Ukraine	14:36.10; NR	Gregorio Paltrinieri; Italy	14:39.79	Damien Joly; France	14:50.36
50 m backstroke	Apostolos Christou; Greece	24.36 NR	Thomas Ceccon; Italy	24.40 NR	Ole Braunschweig; Germany	24.68
100 m backstroke	Thomas Ceccon; Italy	52.21	Apostolos Christou; Greece	52.24	Yohann Ndoye-Brouard; France	52.92
200 m backstroke	Yohann Ndoye-Brouard; France	1:55.62; NR	Benedek Kovács; Hungary	1:56.03	Luke Greenbank; Great Britain	1:56.15
50 m breaststroke	Nicolò Martinenghi; Italy	26.33; NR	Simone Cerasuolo; Italy	26.95	Lucas Matzerath; Germany	27.11
100 m breaststroke	Nicolò Martinenghi; Italy	58.26 =NR	Federico Poggio; Italy	58.98	Andrius Šidlauskas; Lithuania	59.50
200 m breaststroke	James Wilby; Great Britain	2:08.96	Matti Mattsson; Finland	2:09.40	Luca Pizzini; Italy	2:09.97
50 m butterfly	Thomas Ceccon; Italy	22.89	Maxime Grousset; France	22.97	Diogo Ribeiro; Portugal	23.07; NR
100 m butterfly	Kristóf Milák; Hungary	50.33	Noè Ponti; Switzerland	50.87	Jakub Majerski; Poland	51.22
200 m butterfly	Kristóf Milák; Hungary	1:52.01	Richárd Márton; Hungary	1:54.78	Alberto Razzetti; Italy	1:55.01
200 m individual medley	Hubert Kós; Hungary	1:57.22	Alberto Razzetti; Italy	1:57.82	Gabriel Lopes; Portugal	1:58.34
400 m individual medley	Alberto Razzetti; Italy	4:10.60	Dávid Verrasztó; Hungary	4:12.58	Pier Andrea Matteazzi; Italy	4:13.29
4 × 100 m freestyle relay	Italy; Alessandro Miressi (47.76); Thomas Ceccon (47.88); Lorenzo Zazzeri (47.60); Manuel Frigo (47.26); Alessandro Bori^{[a]} Leonardo Deplano^{[a]} Filippo Megli^{[a]}	3:10.50	Hungary; Nándor Németh (47.86); Szebasztián Szabó (48.42); Dániel Mészáros (2003) (48.91); Kristóf Milák (47.24)	3:12.43	Great Britain; Jacob Whittle (48.72); Matthew Richards (47.88); Thomas Dean (47.74); Edward Mildred (48.36)	3:12.70
4 × 200 m freestyle relay	Hungary; Nándor Németh (1:46.28); Richárd Márton (1:47.01); Balázs Holló (1:47.67); Kristóf Milák (1:44.42); Dániel Mészáros^{[a]}	7:05.38; NR	Italy; Marco De Tullio (1:46.47); Lorenzo Galossi (1:47.91); Gabriele Detti (1:46.51); Stefano Di Cola (1:45.36); Matteo Ciampi^{[a]} Filippo Megli^{[a]}	7:06.25	France; Hadrien Salvan (1:46.50); Wissam-Amazigh Yebba (1:45.92); Enzo Tesic (1:47.51); Roman Fuchs (1:47.04); Mewen Tomac^{[a]}	7:06.97
4 × 100 m medley relay	Italy; Thomas Ceccon (52.82); Nicolò Martinenghi (57.72); Matteo Rivolta (50.75); Alessandro Miressi (47.17); Michele Lamberti^{[a]} Federico Poggio^{[a]} Federico Burdisso^{[a]} Manuel Frigo^{[a]}	3:28.46; CR	France; Yohann Ndoye-Brouard (53.06); Antoine Viquerat (1:00.48); Clément Secchi (51.53); Maxime Grousset (47.43); Mewen Tomac^{[a]} Charles Rihoux^{[a]}	3:32.50	Austria; Bernhard Reitshammer (54.68); Valentin Bayer (59.54); Simon Bucher (50.97); Heiko Gigler (48.09)	3:33.28

^{a} Swimmers who participated in the heats only and received medals.

=== Women ===
Event	Gold		Silver		Bronze	
50 m freestyle	Sarah Sjöström; Sweden	23.91	Katarzyna Wasick; Poland	24.20	Valerie van Roon; Netherlands	24.64
100 m freestyle	Marrit Steenbergen; Netherlands	53.24	Charlotte Bonnet; France	53.62	Freya Anderson; Great Britain	53.63
200 m freestyle	Marrit Steenbergen; Netherlands	1:56.36	Freya Anderson; Great Britain	1:56.52	Isabel Marie Gose; Germany	1:57.09
400 m freestyle	Isabel Marie Gose; Germany	4:04.13	Simona Quadarella; Italy	4:04.77	Ajna Késely; Hungary	4:08.00
800 m freestyle	Simona Quadarella; Italy	8:20.54	Isabel Marie Gose; Germany	8:22.01	Merve Tuncel; Turkey	8:24.33
1500 m freestyle	Simona Quadarella; Italy	15:54.15	Viktória Mihályvári-Farkas; Hungary	16:02.15	Martina Caramignoli; Italy	16:12.39
50 m backstroke	Analia Pigrée; France	27.27; NR	Silvia Scalia; Italy	27.53	Maaike de Waard; Netherlands	27.54
100 m backstroke	Margherita Panziera; Italy	59.40	Medi Harris; Great Britain	59.46	Kira Toussaint; Netherlands	59.53
200 m backstroke	Margherita Panziera; Italy	2:07.13	Katie Shanahan; Great Britain	2:09.26	Dóra Molnár; Hungary	2:09.73
50 m breaststroke	Rūta Meilutytė; Lithuania	29.59	Benedetta Pilato; Italy	29.71	Imogen Clark; Great Britain	30.31
100 m breaststroke	Benedetta Pilato; Italy	1:05.97	Lisa Angiolini; Italy	1:06.34	Rūta Meilutytė; Lithuania	1:06.50
200 m breaststroke	Lisa Mamié; Switzerland	2:23.27	Martina Carraro; Italy	2:23.64	Kotryna Teterevkova; Lithuania	2:24.16
50 m butterfly	Sarah Sjöström; Sweden	24.96	Marie Wattel; France	25.33	Maaike de Waard; Netherlands	25.62
100 m butterfly	Louise Hansson; Sweden	56.66	Marie Wattel; France	56.80	Lana Pudar; Bosnia and Herzegovina	57.27; NR
200 m butterfly	Lana Pudar; Bosnia and Herzegovina	2:06.81; NR	Helena Rosendahl Bach; Denmark	2:07.30; NR	Ilaria Cusinato; Italy	2:07.77
200 m individual medley	Anastasia Gorbenko; Israel	2:10.92	Marrit Steenbergen; Netherlands	2:11.14	Sara Franceschi; Italy	2:11.38
400 m individual medley	Viktória Mihályvári-Farkas; Hungary	4:37.56	Zsuzsanna Jakabos; Hungary	4:39.79	Freya Colbert; Great Britain	4:40.06
4 × 100 m freestyle relay	Great Britain; Lucy Hope (54.88); Anna Hopkin (53.44); Medi Harris (54.61); Freya Anderson (53.54)	3:36.47	Sweden; Sarah Sjöström (53.12); Louise Hansson (54.21); Sara Junevik (55.12); Sofia Åstedt (54.84)	3:37.29	Netherlands; Kim Busch (55.21); Tessa Giele (54.60); Valerie van Roon (54.76); Marrit Steenbergen (53.02)	3:37.59
4 × 200 m freestyle relay	Netherlands; Imani de Jong (1:58.97); Silke Holkenborg (1:58.92); Janna van Kooten (1:59.92); Marrit Steenbergen (1:56.26); Lotte Hosper^{[b]}	7:54.07	Great Britain; Freya Colbert (1:58.72); Lucy Hope (1:58.98); Medi Harris (2:00.01); Freya Anderson (1:57.02); Tamryn van Selm^{[b]} Holly Hibbott^{[b]}	7:54.73	Hungary; Nikolett Pádár (1:58.52); Katinka Hosszú (2:00.62); Ajna Késely (1:59.43); Lilla Minna Ábrahám (1:57.16); Zsuzsanna Jakabos^{[b]} Dóra Molnár^{[b]}	7:55.73
4 × 100 m medley relay	Sweden; Hanna Rosvall (1:00.66); Sophie Hansson (1:06.26); Louise Hansson (56.29); Sarah Sjöström (52.04)	3:55.25	France; Pauline Mahieu (1:00.17); Charlotte Bonnet (1:06.49); Marie Wattel (56.09); Béryl Gastaldello (53.61); Emma Terebo^{[b]} Adèle Blanchetière^{[b]}	3:56.36; NR	Netherlands; Kira Toussaint (1:00.29); Tes Schouten (1:06.75); Maaike de Waard (57.74); Marrit Steenbergen (52.23); Tessa Giele^{[b]} Valerie van Roon^{[b]}	3:57.01; NR

^{b} Swimmers who participated in the heats only and received medals.

=== Mixed events ===
Event	Gold		Silver		Bronze	
4 × 100 m mixed freestyle relay	France; Maxime Grousset (48.02); Charles Rihoux (48.39); Charlotte Bonnet (53.34); Marie Wattel (53.05); Hadrien Salvan^{[c]} Lucile Tessariol^{[c]} Béryl Gastaldello^{[c]}	3:22.80	Great Britain; Thomas Dean (48.46); Matthew Richards (48.19); Anna Hopkin (53.62); Freya Anderson (53.03); Edward Mildred^{[c]} Jacob Whittle^{[c]} Lucy Hope^{[c]}	3:23.30	Sweden; Björn Seeliger (48.09); Robin Hanson (48.91); Sarah Sjöström (52.68); Louise Hansson (53.72); Sofia Åstedt^{[c]}	3:23.40; NR
4 × 200 m mixed freestyle relay	Great Britain; Thomas Dean (1:46.15); Matthew Richards (1:46.91); Freya Colbert (1:57.29); Freya Anderson (1:57.81); Kieran Bird^{[c]} Jacob Whittle^{[c]} Lucy Hope^{[c]}	7:28.16	France; Hadrien Salvan (1:47.63); Wissam-Amazigh Yebba (1:46.53); Charlotte Bonnet (1:56.39); Lucile Tessariol (1:58.70); Roman Fuchs^{[c]} Giulia Rossi-Bene^{[c]}	7:29.25; NR	Italy; Stefano Di Cola (1:47.00); Matteo Ciampi (1:47.69); Alice Mizzau (1:58.73); Antonietta Cesarano (1:58.43); Filippo Megli^{[c]} Noemi Cesarano^{[c]} Linda Caponi^{[c]}	7:31.85; NR
4 × 100 m mixed medley relay	Netherlands; Kira Toussaint (59.49); Arno Kamminga (59.19); Nyls Korstanje (50.72); Marrit Steenbergen (52.33); Tessa Giele^{[c]}	3:41.73	Italy; Thomas Ceccon (52.82); Nicolò Martinenghi (58.13); Elena Di Liddo (58.49); Silvia Di Pietro (54.17); Michele Lamberti^{[c]} Francesca Fangio^{[c]} Ilaria Bianchi^{[c]} Leonardo Deplano^{[c]}	3:43.61	Great Britain; Medi Harris (1:00.20); James Wilby (59.31); Jacob Peters (51.84); Anna Hopkin (53.34); Lauren Cox^{[c]} Greg Butler^{[c]}	3:44.69

^{c} Swimmers who participated in the heats only and received medals.

== Diving ==
=== Medal table ===
After all 13 events.

* Host nation (Italy)

Rank	Nation	Gold	Silver	Bronze	Total
1	Great Britain	6	3	3	12
2	Italy*	4	3	5	12
3	Germany	2	0	3	5
4	Ukraine	1	5	1	7
5	Sweden	0	1	1	2
6	Switzerland	0	1	0	1
Totals (6 entries)		13	13	13	39

=== Men ===
Event	Gold		Silver		Bronze	
1 m springboard	Jack Laugher; Great Britain	413.40	Lorenzo Marsaglia; Italy	396.25	Giovanni Tocci; Italy	386.20
3 m springboard	Lorenzo Marsaglia; Italy	453.85	Jordan Houlden; Great Britain	428.55	Giovanni Tocci; Italy	392.70
3 m springboard synchro	Great Britain; Anthony Harding; Jack Laugher	412.83	Italy; Lorenzo Marsaglia; Giovanni Tocci	387.51	Ukraine; Oleksandr Horshkovozov; Oleh Kolodiy	384.39
10 m platform	Oleksiy Sereda; Ukraine	493.55	Noah Williams; Great Britain	459.00	Ben Cutmore; Great Britain	438.35
10 m platform synchro	Great Britain; Ben Cutmore; Kyle Kothari	390.48	Ukraine; Kirill Boliukh; Oleksiy Sereda	388.02	Germany; Timo Barthel; Jaden Eikermann	369.30

=== Women ===
Event	Gold		Silver		Bronze	
1 m springboard	Elena Bertocchi; Italy	264.25	Emma Gullstrand; Sweden	259.65	Chiara Pellacani; Italy	259.05
3 m springboard	Chiara Pellacani; Italy	318.75	Michelle Heimberg; Switzerland	301.80	Yasmin Harper; Great Britain	296.20
3 m springboard synchro	Germany; Lena Hentschel; Tina Punzel	281.16	Italy; Elena Bertocchi; Chiara Pellacani	260.76	Sweden; Emilia Nilsson; Elna Widerström	257.70
10 m platform	Andrea Spendolini-Sirieix; Great Britain	333.60	Sofiya Lyskun; Ukraine	329.80	Christina Wassen; Germany	314.10
10 m platform synchro	Great Britain; Andrea Spendolini-Sirieix; Lois Toulson	303.60	Ukraine; Kseniya Baylo; Sofiya Lyskun	298.86	Germany; Christina Wassen; Elena Wassen	289.86

=== Mixed events ===
Event	Gold		Silver		Bronze	
3 m springboard synchro	Germany; Lou Massenberg; Tina Punzel	294.69	Great Britain; James Heatly; Grace Reid	290.76	Italy; Chiara Pellacani; Matteo Santoro	283.56
10 m platform synchro	Great Britain; Kyle Kothari; Lois Toulson	300.78	Ukraine; Sofiya Lyskun; Oleksiy Sereda	298.59	Italy; Sarah Jodoin Di Maria; Eduard Timbretti Gugiu	290.28
Team event	Italy; Eduard Timbretti Gugiu; Sarah Jodoin Di Maria; Andreas Sargent Larsen; Chiara Pellacani	402.55	Ukraine; Kseniya Baylo; Kirill Boliukh; Viktoriya Kesar; Danylo Konovalov	399.05	Great Britain; James Heatly; Noah Williams; Andrea Spendolini-Sirieix; Grace Reid	384.70

== High diving ==
=== Medal table ===
After all 2 events.

* Host nation (Italy)

Rank	Nation	Gold	Silver	Bronze	Total
1	Romania	1	1	0	2
2	Germany	1	0	0	1
3	Ukraine	0	1	0	1
4	Italy*	0	0	2	2
Totals (4 entries)		2	2	2	6

=== Results ===
Event	Gold		Silver		Bronze	
Men	Constantin Popovici; Romania	455.70	Cătălin Preda; Romania	436.20	Alessandro De Rose; Italy	416.45
Women	Iris Schmidbauer; Germany	309.30	Antonina Vyshyvanova; Ukraine	295.40	Elisa Cosetti; Italy	284.30

== Open water swimming ==
=== Medal table ===
After all 7 events.
‡ The two events previously cancelled are restored and reassigned.

* Host nation (Italy)

Rank	Nation	Gold	Silver	Bronze	Total
1	Italy*	4	4	3	11
2	France	1	1	3	5
3	Germany	1	0	0	1
3	Netherlands	1	0	0	1
5	Hungary	0	1	0	1
5	Spain	0	1	0	1
7	Portugal	0	0	1	1
Totals (7 entries)		7	7	7	21

=== Men ===
Event	Gold		Silver		Bronze	
5 km	Gregorio Paltrinieri; Italy	52:13.5	Domenico Acerenza; Italy	52:14.2	Marc-Antoine Olivier; France	52:20.8
10 km	Domenico Acerenza; Italy	1:50:33.6	Marc-Antoine Olivier; France	1:50:37.3	Logan Fontaine; France	1:50:39.1
25 km †‡	Mario Sanzullo; Italy		Dario Verani; Italy		Matteo Furlan; Italy	

† Cancelled due to extreme weather
‡ The race positions and medals have been restored and reassigned.

=== Women ===
Event	Gold		Silver		Bronze	
5 km	Sharon van Rouwendaal; Netherlands	56:58.7	María de Valdés; Spain	57:00.2	Giulia Gabbrielleschi; Italy	57:00.3
10 km	Leonie Beck; Germany	2:01:13.4	Ginevra Taddeucci; Italy	2:01:15.2	Angélica André; Portugal	2:01:16.4
25 km †‡	Caroline Jouisse; France		Barbara Pozzobon; Italy		Veronica Santoni; Italy	

† Cancelled due to extreme weather
‡ The race positions and medals have been restored and reassigned.

=== Team ===
Event	Gold		Silver		Bronze	
Team	Italy; Rachele Bruni; Ginevra Taddeucci; Gregorio Paltrinieri; Domenico Acerenza	59:43.1	Hungary; Réka Rohács; Anna Olasz; Dávid Betlehem; Kristóf Rasovszky	59:53.9	France; Madelon Catteau; Aurélie Muller; Axel Reymond; Logan Fontaine	1:00:08.3

== Artistic swimming ==
=== Medal table ===
After all 12 events.

* Host nation (Italy)

Rank	Nation	Gold	Silver	Bronze	Total
1	Ukraine	8	0	0	8
2	Italy*	4	6	2	12
3	Spain	0	4	0	4
4	Austria	0	2	2	4
5	France	0	0	4	4
6	Slovakia	0	0	2	2
7	Greece	0	0	1	1
7	Serbia	0	0	1	1
Totals (8 entries)		12	12	12	36

=== Results ===
Event	Gold		Silver		Bronze	
Solo free routine	Marta Fiedina; Ukraine	94.6333	Linda Cerruti; Italy	92.1000	Vasiliki Alexandri; Austria	91.8333
Men solo free routine	Giorgio Minisini; Italy	88.4667	Fernando Díaz del Río; Spain	83.3333	Quentin Rakotomalala; France	78.0000
Solo technical routine	Marta Fiedina; Ukraine	92.6394	Linda Cerruti; Italy	90.8839	Vasiliki Alexandri; Austria	90.0156
Men solo technical routine	Giorgio Minisini; Italy	85.7033	Fernando Díaz del Río; Spain	79.4951	Ivan Martinović; Serbia	58.8834
Duet free routine	Ukraine; Maryna Aleksiyiva; Vladyslava Aleksiyiva	94.7333	Austria; Anna-Maria Alexandri; Eirini-Marina Alexandri	93.0000	Italy; Linda Cerruti; Costanza Ferro	91.7000
Duet technical routine	Ukraine; Maryna Aleksiyiva; Vladyslava Aleksiyiva	92.8538	Austria; Anna-Maria Alexandri; Eirini-Marina Alexandri	91.9852	Italy; Linda Cerruti; Costanza Ferro	90.3577
Team free routine	Ukraine; Maryna Aleksiyiva; Vladyslava Aleksiyiva; Olesia Derevianchenko; Marta Fiedina; Veronika Hryshko; Anhelina Ovchynnikova; Anastasiia Shmonina; Valeriya Tyshchenko	95.1000	Italy; Domiziana Cavanna; Linda Cerruti; Costanza Di Camillo; Costanza Ferro; Gemma Galli; Marta Iacoacci; Enrica Piccoli; Francesca Zunino	92.6667	France; Ambre Esnault; Laura González; Mayssa Guermoud; Oriane Jaillardon; Maureen Jenkins; Romane Lunel; Eve Planeix; Charlotte Tremble	90.5667
Team technical routine	Ukraine; Maryna Aleksiyiva; Vladyslava Aleksiyiva; Olesia Derevianchenko; Marta Fiedina; Veronika Hryshko; Anhelina Ovchynnikova; Anastasiia Shmonina; Valeriya Tyshchenko	92.5106	Italy; Domiziana Cavanna; Linda Cerruti; Costanza Di Camillo; Costanza Ferro; Gemma Galli; Marta Iacoacci; Marta Murru; Enrica Piccoli	90.3772	France; Ambre Esnault; Laura González; Mayssa Guermoud; Oriane Jaillardon; Maureen Jenkins; Romane Lunel; Eve Planeix; Charlotte Tremble	88.0093
Combination routine	Ukraine; Maryna Aleksiyiva; Vladyslava Aleksiyiva; Olesia Derevianchenko; Marta Fiedina; Veronika Hryshko; Sofiia Matsiievska; Daria Moshynska; Anhelina Ovchynnikova; Anastasiia Shmonina; Valeriya Tyshchenko	95.2000	Italy; Domiziana Cavanna; Linda Cerruti; Costanza Di Camillo; Costanza Ferro; Gemma Galli; Marta Iacoacci; Marta Murru; Enrica Piccoli; Federica Sala; Francesca Zunino	92.6667	Greece; Zoi Agrafioti; Maria Alzigkouzi Kominea; Eleni Fragkaki; Krystalenia Gialama; Zoi Karangelou; Maria Karapanagiotou; Danai Kariori; Ifigeneia Krommydaki; Sofia Malkogeorgou; Andriana Misikevych	89.4000
Highlights routine	Ukraine; Maryna Aleksiyiva; Vladyslava Aleksiyiva; Olesia Derevianchenko; Marta Fiedina; Veronika Hryshko; Sofiia Matsiievska; Daria Moshynska; Anhelina Ovchynnikova; Anastasiia Shmonina; Valeriya Tyshchenko	94.0667	Italy; Domiziana Cavanna; Linda Cerruti; Costanza Di Camillo; Costanza Ferro; Gemma Galli; Marta Iacoacci; Marta Murru; Enrica Piccoli; Federica Sala; Francesca Zunino	91.7000	France; Camille Bravard; Manon Disbeaux; Ambre Esnault; Laura González; Mayssa Guermoud; Maureen Jenkins; Romane Lunel; Eve Planeix; Charlotte Tremble; Mathilde Vigneres	89.2000
Mixed free routine	Italy; Giorgio Minisini; Lucrezia Ruggiero	89.7333	Spain; Emma García; Pau Ribes	84.7667	Slovakia; Jozef Solymosy; Silvia Solymosyová	77.0333
Mixed technical routine	Italy; Giorgio Minisini; Lucrezia Ruggiero	89.3679	Spain; Emma García; Pau Ribes	83.7548	Slovakia; Jozef Solymosy; Silvia Solymosyová	75.5914
