= Maryna Aleksiyiva =

Ukrainian synchronised swimmer (born 2001)

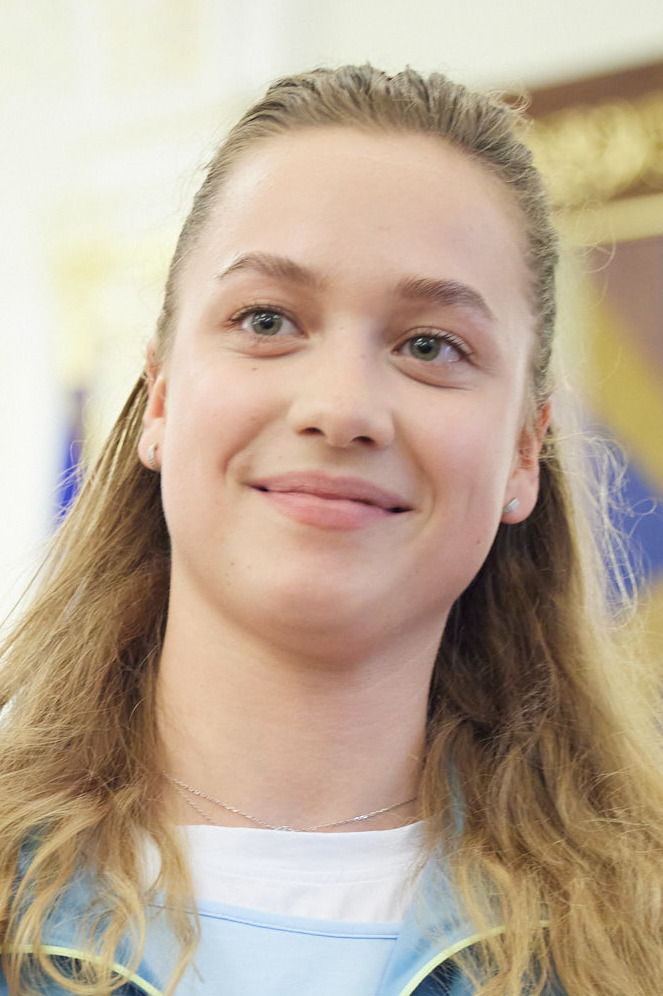
- Aleksiyiva in 2021

Personal information
- Nationality: Ukrainian
- Born: 29 May 2001 (age 25) Kharkiv Oblast, Ukraine

Sport
- Sport: Swimming
- Strokes: Synchronised swimming
Medal record
Women's artistic swimming
Representing Ukraine
Event	1st	2nd	3rd
Olympic Games	0	0	1
World Championships	3	5	5
European Championships	10	3	0
European Games	0	2	0
World Junior Championships	0	2	1
European Junior Championships	0	4	0
Total	13	16	7
Olympic Games
Bronze medal – third place	2020 Tokyo	Team
World Championships
Gold medal – first place	2019 Gwangju	Highlight routine
Gold medal – first place	2022 Budapest	Free routine combination
Gold medal – first place	2022 Budapest	Highlight routine
Silver medal – second place	2017 Budapest	Free routine combination
Silver medal – second place	2022 Budapest	Duet technical routine
Silver medal – second place	2022 Budapest	Duet free routine
Silver medal – second place	2022 Budapest	Team free routine
Silver medal – second place	2024 Doha	Team acrobatic routine
Bronze medal – third place	2017 Budapest	Team free routine
Bronze medal – third place	2019 Gwangju	Team technical routine
Bronze medal – third place	2019 Gwangju	Team free routine
Bronze medal – third place	2019 Gwangju	Free routine combination
Bronze medal – third place	2023 Fukuoka	Team free routine
European Games
Silver medal – second place	2023 Kraków-Małopolska	Duet free routine
Silver medal – second place	2023 Kraków-Małopolska	Team acrobatic routine
European Championships
Gold medal – first place	2018 Glasgow	Free routine combination
Gold medal – first place	2020 Budapest	Team free routine
Gold medal – first place	2020 Budapest	Combination routine
Gold medal – first place	2020 Budapest	Highlights routine
Gold medal – first place	2022 Rome	Duet free routine
Gold medal – first place	2022 Rome	Duet technical routine
Gold medal – first place	2022 Rome	Team free routine
Gold medal – first place	2022 Rome	Team technical routine
Gold medal – first place	2022 Rome	Combination routine
Gold medal – first place	2022 Rome	Highlights routine
Silver medal – second place	2018 Glasgow	Team free routine
Silver medal – second place	2018 Glasgow	Team technical routine
Silver medal – second place	2020 Budapest	Team technical routine
World Junior Championships
Silver medal – second place	2018 Budapest	Duet technical routine
Silver medal – second place	2018 Budapest	Duet free routine
Bronze medal – third place	2016 Kazan	Team routine
European Junior Championships
Silver medal – second place	2016 Rijeka	Team routine
Silver medal – second place	2016 Rijeka	Team free routine
Silver medal – second place	2018 Tampere	Duet free routine
Silver medal – second place	2018 Tampere	Duet technical routine

Maryna Antonivna Aleksiyiva (Ukrainian: Марина Антонівна Алексіїва; born 29 May 2001) is a Ukrainian synchronised swimmer. She is World Championships medalist. Vladyslava Aleksiyiva, who is also a synchro swimmer, is her twin sister.

== Career ==
At the 2017 World Aquatics Championships Aleksiyiva won a bronze medal in team free routine which became her first major international achievement. The next day she won silver in the combination event.

In the summer of 2018, she was a member of the Ukrainian synchronized swimming team, which became the best at the European Summer Sports Championships.

At the World Aquatics Championships in July 2019 in synchronized swimming, the group, technical program she and Vladyslava Aleksiyiva, Yana Nariezhna, Kateryna Reznik, Anastasiya Savchuk, Marta Fiedina, Alina Shynkarenko, Yelyzaveta Yakhno won bronze awards. In the highlight program, the team won gold awards.

At the 2024 Summer Olympics in Paris, Aleksiyiva and her duet partner Vladyslava Aleksiyiva finished fifth in artistic swimming.

In July 2024, Aleksiyiva and Vladyslava Aleksiyiva are the main characters of the documentary The Sirens of Ukraine, directed by Louis Villers and broadcast on Canal Plus in France.
