= Vladyslava Aleksiyiva =

Ukrainian synchronised swimmer (born 2001)

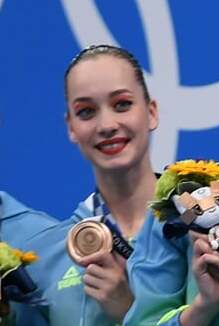
- Aleksiyiva in 2021

Personal information
- Nationality: Ukrainian
- Born: 29 May 2001 (age 25) Kharkiv Oblast, Ukraine

Sport
- Sport: Swimming
- Strokes: Synchronised swimming
Medal record
Women's artistic swimming
Representing Ukraine
Event	1st	2nd	3rd
Olympic Games	0	0	1
World Championships	3	5	5
European Championships	10	2	0
European Games	0	2	0
World Junior Championships	0	3	0
European Junior Championships	0	5	0
Total	13	17	6
Olympic Games
Bronze medal – third place	2020 Tokyo	Team
World Championships
Gold medal – first place	2019 Gwangju	Highlight routine
Gold medal – first place	2022 Budapest	Free routine combination
Gold medal – first place	2022 Budapest	Highlight routine
Silver medal – second place	2017 Budapest	Free routine combination
Silver medal – second place	2022 Budapest	Duet technical routine
Silver medal – second place	2022 Budapest	Duet free routine
Silver medal – second place	2022 Budapest	Team free routine
Silver medal – second place	2024 Doha	Team acrobatic routine
Bronze medal – third place	2017 Budapest	Team free routine
Bronze medal – third place	2019 Gwangju	Team technical routine
Bronze medal – third place	2019 Gwangju	Team free routine
Bronze medal – third place	2019 Gwangju	Free routine combination
Bronze medal – third place	2023 Fukuoka	Team free routine
European Games
Silver medal – second place	2023 Kraków-Małopolska	Duet free routine
Silver medal – second place	2023 Kraków-Małopolska	Team acrobatic routine
European Championships
Gold medal – first place	2018 Glasgow	Free routine combination
Gold medal – first place	2020 Budapest	Team free routine
Gold medal – first place	2020 Budapest	Combination routine
Gold medal – first place	2020 Budapest	Highlights routine
Gold medal – first place	2022 Rome	Duet free routine
Gold medal – first place	2022 Rome	Duet technical routine
Gold medal – first place	2022 Rome	Team free routine
Gold medal – first place	2022 Rome	Team technical routine
Gold medal – first place	2022 Rome	Combination routine
Gold medal – first place	2022 Rome	Highlights routine
Silver medal – second place	2018 Glasgow	Team technical routine
Silver medal – second place	2020 Budapest	Team technical routine
World Junior Championships
Silver medal – second place	2016 Kazan	Duet routine
Silver medal – second place	2018 Budapest	Duet technical routine
Silver medal – second place	2018 Budapest	Duet free routine
European Junior Championships
Silver medal – second place	2016 Rijeka	Team routine
Silver medal – second place	2016 Rijeka	Duet routine
Silver medal – second place	2016 Rijeka	Free routine combination
Silver medal – second place	2018 Tampere	Duet free routine
Silver medal – second place	2018 Tampere	Duet technical routine

Vladyslava Antonivna Aleksiyiva (Ukrainian: Владислава Антонівна Алексіїва; born 29 May 2001) is a Ukrainian synchronised swimmer. She is World Championships medalist. Maryna Aleksiyiva, who is also a synchro swimmer, is her twin sister.

== Career ==
At the 2017 World Aquatics Championships Aleksiiva won a bronze medal in team free routine which became her first major international achievement. The next day she won silver in the combination event.
