= Veronika Hryshko =

Ukrainian synchronised swimmer

Personal information
- Nationality: Ukrainian
- Born: 31 August 2000 (age 25) Donetsk, Ukraine

Sport
- Sport: Swimming
- Strokes: Synchronised swimming
Medal record
Women's artistic swimming
Representing Ukraine
Event	1st	2nd	3rd
World Championships	3	2	2
European Championships	6	1	0
European Games	0	1	2
World Junior Championships	0	0	1
European Junior Championships	0	4	0
Total	9	8	5
World Championships
Gold medal – first place	2019 Gwangju	Highlight routine
Gold medal – first place	2022 Budapest	Free routine combination
Gold medal – first place	2022 Budapest	Highlight routine
Silver medal – second place	2022 Budapest	Team free routine
Silver medal – second place	2024 Doha	Team acrobatic routine
Bronze medal – third place	2022 Budapest	Free routine combination
Bronze medal – third place	2023 Fukuoka	Team free routine
European Championships
Gold medal – first place	2020 Budapest	Combination routine
Gold medal – first place	2020 Budapest	Highlights routine
Gold medal – first place	2022 Rome	Team free routine
Gold medal – first place	2022 Rome	Team technical routine
Gold medal – first place	2022 Rome	Combination routine
Gold medal – first place	2022 Rome	Highlights routine
Silver medal – second place	2018 Glasgow	Team free routine
European Games
Silver medal – second place	2023 Kraków-Małopolska	Team acrobatic routine
Bronze medal – third place	2015 Baku	Team
Bronze medal – third place	2015 Baku	Free routine combination
World Junior Championships
Bronze medal – third place	2016 Kazan	Team routine
European Junior Championships
Silver medal – second place	2016 Rijeka	Team routine
Silver medal – second place	2016 Rijeka	Free routine combination
Silver medal – second place	2017 Belgrade	Team routine
Silver medal – second place	2017 Belgrade	Free routine combination

Veronika Hryshko (Ukrainian: Вероніка Гришко; born 31 August 2000) is a Ukrainian synchronised swimmer. She is a World Championships medalist.
