= Marta Fiedina =

Ukrainian synchro swimmer

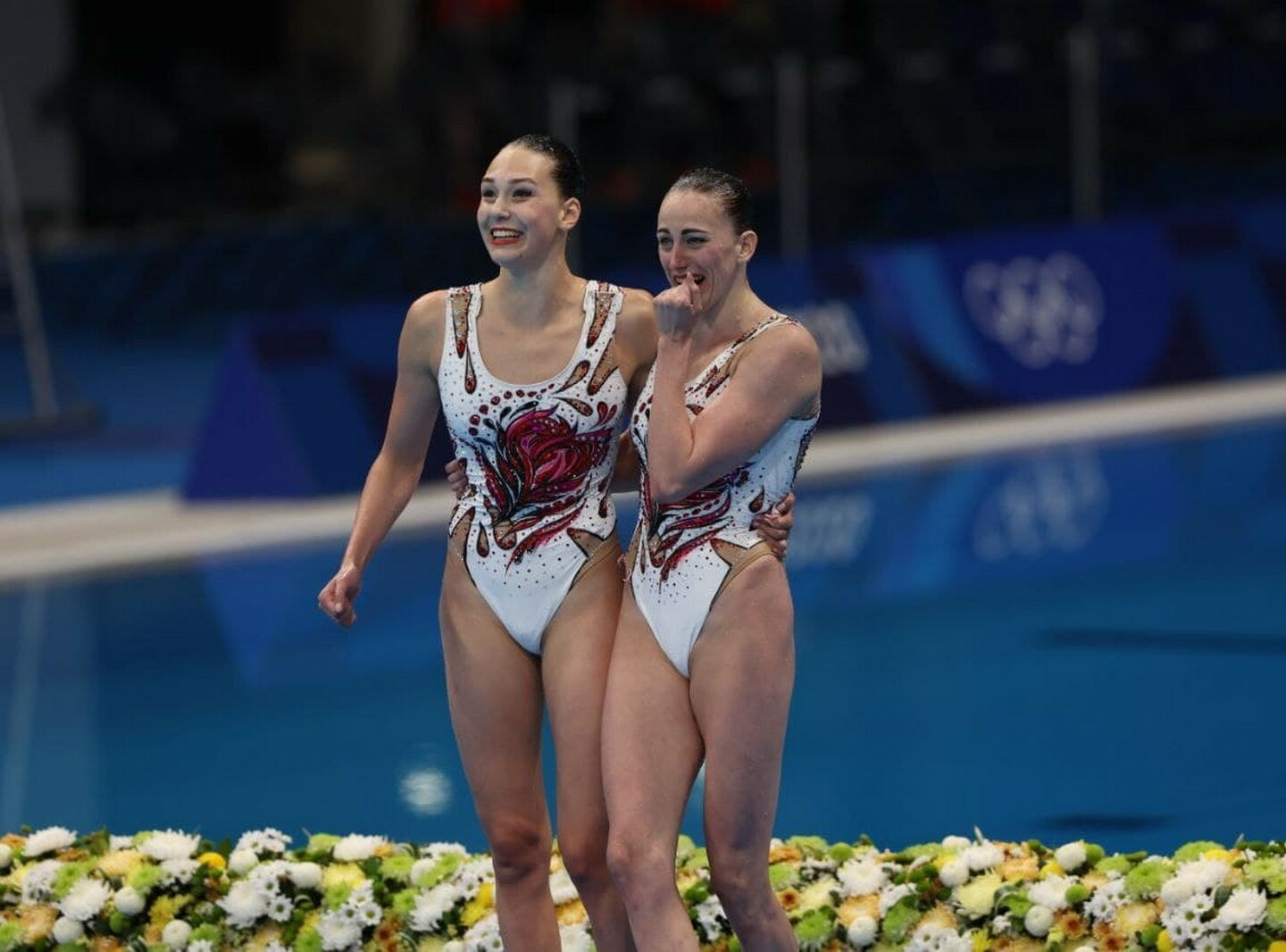
- Fiedina (left) and Anastasiya Savchuk at the 2020 Summer Olympics

Personal information
- Full name: Marta Vadymivna Fiedina
- Nationality: Ukrainian
- Born: 1 February 2002 (age 24) Donetsk, Ukraine

Sport
- Sport: Swimming
- Retired: yes
- Strokes: Synchronised swimming
Medal record
Women's artistic swimming
Representing Ukraine
Event	1st	2nd	3rd
Olympic Games	0	0	2
World Championships	2	4	5
European Championships	11	4	0
European Games	0	1	0
World Junior Championships	0	4	0
European Junior Championships	0	7	0
Total	13	20	7
Olympic Games
Bronze medal – third place	2020 Tokyo	Duet
Bronze medal – third place	2020 Tokyo	Team
World Championships
Gold medal – first place	2022 Budapest	Free routine combination
Gold medal – first place	2022 Budapest	Highlight routine
Silver medal – second place	2022 Budapest	Solo technical routine
Silver medal – second place	2022 Budapest	Solo free routine
Silver medal – second place	2022 Budapest	Team free routine
Silver medal – second place	2024 Doha	Team acrobatic routine
Bronze medal – third place	2019 Gwangju	Duet technical routine
Bronze medal – third place	2019 Gwangju	Duet free routine
Bronze medal – third place	2019 Gwangju	Team technical routine
Bronze medal – third place	2019 Gwangju	Team free routine
Bronze medal – third place	2023 Fukuoka	Team free routine
European Games
Silver medal – second place	2023 Kraków-Małopolska	Team acrobatic routine
European Championships
Gold medal – first place	2018 Glasgow	Free routine combination
Gold medal – first place	2020 Budapest	Solo technical routine
Gold medal – first place	2020 Budapest	Team free routine
Gold medal – first place	2020 Budapest	Combination routine
Gold medal – first place	2020 Budapest	Highlights routine
Gold medal – first place	2022 Rome	Solo free routine
Gold medal – first place	2022 Rome	Solo technical routine
Gold medal – first place	2022 Rome	Team free routine
Gold medal – first place	2022 Rome	Team technical routine
Gold medal – first place	2022 Rome	Combination routine
Gold medal – first place	2022 Rome	Highlights routine
Silver medal – second place	2020 Budapest	Solo free routine
Silver medal – second place	2020 Budapest	Duet technical routine
Silver medal – second place	2020 Budapest	Duet free routine
Silver medal – second place	2020 Budapest	Team technical routine
World Junior Championships
Silver medal – second place	2018 Budapest	Solo technical routine
Silver medal – second place	2018 Budapest	Solo free routine
Silver medal – second place	2018 Budapest	Team free routine
Silver medal – second place	2018 Budapest	Team free combination
European Junior Championships
Silver medal – second place	2017 Belgrade	Solo routine
Silver medal – second place	2017 Belgrade	Team routine
Silver medal – second place	2017 Belgrade	Duet routine
Silver medal – second place	2017 Belgrade	Free combination routine
Silver medal – second place	2018 Tampere	Free combination routine
Silver medal – second place	2018 Tampere	Solo free routine
Silver medal – second place	2018 Tampere	Solo technical routine

Marta Vadymivna Fiedina (Ukrainian: Марта Вадимівна Федіна; born 1 February 2002) is a retired Ukrainian synchro swimmer. She is a twice Olympic bronze medalist.

== Career ==
At the 2020 Summer Olympics (postponed to 2021 because of the COVID-19 pandemic), Fiedina and her duet partner Anastasiya Savchuk won Ukraine's first-ever Olympic medal in artistic swimming, scoring a total of 189.4620 in the combined technical and free routines on 4 August. On 7 August, she was part of the Ukrainian team that finished third in the final with a total score of 190.3018, earning her a second bronze medal.

She won the silver medal in the solo technical routine at the 2022 World Aquatics Championships held in Budapest, Hungary.

== Recognition ==
- Nonimee of the Women Artistic Swimmer of the Year according to FINA (2022)
- Best Women Artistic Swimmer of the Year according to LEN (2022)
