= United States at the 2019 World Aquatics Championships =

- Flag of the United States
- World Aquatics code: USA
- National federation: United States Aquatic Sports
- Website: usaquaticsports.org

in Gwangju, South Korea
- Medals Ranked 2nd: Gold 15 Silver 11 Bronze 10 Total 36

World Aquatics Championships appearances
- 1973; 1975; 1978; 1982; 1986; 1991; 1994; 1998; 2001; 2003; 2005; 2007; 2009; 2011; 2013; 2015; 2017; 2019; 2022; 2023; 2024; 2025

The United States competed at the 2019 World Aquatics Championships in Gwangju, South Korea from 12 to 28 July.

== Medalists ==
| Medal | Name | Sport | Event | Date |
|---|---|---|---|---|
| Gold | Nathan Adrian; Zach Apple; Michael Chadwick*; Caeleb Dressel; Townley Haas*; Blake Pieroni | Swimming | Men's 4 × 100 metre freestyle relay | July 21 |
| Gold | Caeleb Dressel | Swimming | Men's 50 metre butterfly | July 22 |
| Gold | Lilly King | Swimming | Women's 100 metre breaststroke | July 23 |
| Gold | Caeleb Dressel | Swimming | Men's 100 metre freestyle | July 25 |
| Gold | Olivia Smoliga | Swimming | Women's 50 metre backstroke | July 25 |
| Gold | United States women's national water polo team: Amanda Longan; Madeline Musselman; Melissa Seidemann; Rachel Fattal; Paige Hauschild; Maggie Steffens; Stephania Haralabidis; Kiley Neushul; Aria Fischer; Kaleigh Gilchrist; Makenzie Fischer; Alys Williams; Ashleigh Johnson | Water polo | Women's tournament | July 26 |
| Gold | Simone Manuel | Swimming | Women's 100 metre freestyle | July 26 |
| Gold | Caeleb Dressel | Swimming | Men's 50 m freestyle | July 27 |
| Gold | Caeleb Dressel | Swimming | Men's 100 m butterfly | July 27 |
| Gold | Katie Ledecky | Swimming | Women's 800 m freestyle | July 27 |
| Gold | Regan Smith | Swimming | Women's 200 m backstroke | July 27 |
| Gold | Nathan Adrian*; Zach Apple; Mallory Comerford; Caeleb Dressel; Simone Manuel; Katie McLaughlin*; Blake Pieroni*; Abbey Weitzeil* | Swimming | Mixed 4×100 m freestyle relay | July 27 |
| Gold | Lilly King | Swimming | Women's 50 metre breaststroke | July 28 |
| Gold | Simone Manuel | Swimming | Women's 50 metre freestyle | July 28 |
| Gold | Regan Smith; Lilly King; Kelsi Dahlia; Simone Manuel; Olivia Smoliga*; Melanie Margalis*; Katie McLaughlin*; Mallory Comerford* | Swimming | Women's 4×100 metre medley relay | July 28 |
| Silver | Sarah Bacon | Diving | Women's 1 metre springboard | July 13 |
| Silver | Haley Anderson | Open water swimming | Women's 10 km | July 14 |
| Silver | Katie Ledecky | Swimming | Women's 400 metre freestyle | July 21 |
| Silver | Mallory Comerford; Kelsi Dahlia; Margo Geer*; Simone Manuel; Lia Neal*; Allison Schmitt*; Abbey Weitzeil | Swimming | Women's 4 × 100 metre freestyle relay | July 21 |
| Silver | Steven LoBue | High diving | Men's high diving | July 24 |
| Silver | Mallory Comerford*; Kelsi Dahlia*; Caeleb Dressel; Matt Grevers*; Lilly King; Simone Manuel; Ryan Murphy; Andrew Wilson* | Swimming | Mixed 4 × 100 metre medley relay | July 24 |
| Silver | Hali Flickinger | Swimming | Women's 200 metre butterfly | July 25 |
| Silver | Gabby DeLoof*; Katie Ledecky; Simone Manuel; Melanie Margalis; Katie McLaughlin; Allison Schmitt*; Leah Smith* | Swimming | Women's 4 × 200 metre freestyle relay | July 25 |
| Silver | Ryan Murphy | Swimming | Men's 200 metre backstroke | July 26 |
| Silver | Jay Litherland | Swimming | Men's 400 metre individual medley | July 28 |
| Silver | Ryan Murphy; Andrew Wilson; Caeleb Dressel; Nathan Adrian; Matt Grevers*; Michael Andrew*; Jack Conger*; Zach Apple* | Swimming | Men's 4×100 metre medley relay | July 28 |
| Bronze | Samantha Bromberg; Katrina Young | Diving | Women's 10 metre synchronized platform | July 14 |
| Bronze | Andrew Capobianco; Katrina Young | Diving | Team event | July 16 |
| Bronze | Hannah Moore | Open water swimming | Women's 5 km | July 17 |
| Bronze | Delaney Schnell | Diving | Women's 10 metre platform | July 17 |
| Bronze | Haley Anderson; Michael Brinegar; Hannah Moore; Jordan Wilimovsky | Open water swimming | Team relay | July 18 |
| Bronze | Leah Smith | Swimming | Women's 400 metre freestyle | July 21 |
| Bronze | Olivia Smoliga | Swimming | Women's 100 metre backstroke | July 23 |
| Bronze | Katie Drabot | Swimming | Women's 200 metre butterfly | July 25 |
| Bronze | Chase Kalisz | Swimming | Men's 200 metre individual medley | July 25 |
| Bronze | Zach Apple; Jack Conger*; Townley Haas; Jack LeVant*; Blake Pieroni; Andrew Seliskar | Swimming | Men's 4 × 200 metre freestyle relay | July 26 |

== Awards ==
- 2019 FINA World Championships: Best Team

== Artistic swimming ==
Women

| Athlete | Event | Preliminaries | | Final | |
| Athlete | Event | Points | Rank | Points | Rank |
|---|---|---|---|---|---|
| Anita Alvarez | Solo free routine | 84.4667 | 12 Q | 84.7333 | 12 |
| Anita Alvarez; Ruby Remati | Duet technical routine | 84.4615 | 12 Q | 84.0190 | 12 |
| Anita Alvarez; Ruby Remati | Duet free routine | 84.5000 | 12 Q | 83.6333 | 12 |
| Paige Areizaga; Nicole Goot; Hannah Heffernan; Daniella Ramirez; Ruby Remati; Abby Remmers; Lindi Schroeder; Emma Tchakmakjian | Team technical routine | 84.4057 | 11 Q | 84.0566 | 11 |
| Anita Alvarez; Paige Areizaga; Nicole Goot; Hannah Heffernan; Daniella Ramirez; Ruby Remati; Abby Remmers; Lindi Schroeder | Team free routine | 85.2667 | 11 Q | 84.4000 | 11 |

Mixed

| Athlete | Event | Preliminaries | | Final | |
| Athlete | Event | Points | Rank | Points | Rank |
|---|---|---|---|---|---|
| Bill May; Natalia Vega | Duet technical routine | 86.3969 | 4 Q | 86.9235 | 4 |
| Bill May; Natalia Vega | Duet free routine | 87.8667 | 4 Q | 88.3000 | 4 |

== Diving ==
Men

| Athlete | Event | Preliminaries | | Semifinals | | Final | |
| Athlete | Event | Points | Rank | Points | Rank | Points | Rank |
|---|---|---|---|---|---|---|---|
| David Boudia | 3 m springboard | 424.45 | 7 Q | 464.20 | 4 Q | 458.10 | 5 |
| David Dinsmore | 10 m platform | 436.95 | 9 Q | 483.60 | 5 Q | 438.15 | 12 |
| Briadam Herrera | 1 m springboard | 365.25 | 6 Q | —N/a | | 399.90 | 6 |
| Michael Hixon | 1 m springboard | 330.00 | 17 | —N/a | | Did not advance | |
| Michael Hixon | 3 m springboard | 423.05 | 8 Q | 428.00 | 12 Q | 449.95 | 7 |
| Brandon Loschiavo | 10 m platform | 401.40 | 12 Q | 433.70 | 9 Q | 470.10 | 8 |
| Andrew Capobianco; Michael Hixon | 3 m synchronized springboard | 374.97 | 7 Q | —N/a | | 388.08 | 8 |
| Benjamin Bramley; Steele Johnson | 10 m synchronized platform | 373.80 | 8 Q | —N/a | | 383.79 | 8 |

Women

| Athlete | Event | Preliminaries | | Semifinals | | Final | |
| Athlete | Event | Points | Rank | Points | Rank | Points | Rank |
|---|---|---|---|---|---|---|---|
| Sarah Bacon | 1 m springboard | 240.00 | 6 Q | —N/a | | 262.00 | 2nd place, silver medalist(s) |
| Sarah Bacon | 3 m springboard | 295.95 | 6 Q | 282.65 | 14 | Did not advance | |
| Maria Coburn | 1 m springboard | 239.70 | 7 Q | —N/a | | 237.75 | 10 |
| Amelia Magana | 10 m platform | 318.10 | 7 Q | 308.50 | 12 Q | 305.00 | 11 |
| Delaney Schnell | 10 m platform | 305.75 | 10 Q | 317.35 | 8 Q | 364.20 | 3rd place, bronze medalist(s) |
| Brooke Schultz | 3 m springboard | 241.45 | 29 | Did not advance | | | |
| Alison Gibson; Krysta Palmer | 3 m synchronized springboard | 274.44 | 5 Q | —N/a | | 274.47 | 10 |
| Samantha Bromberg; Katrina Young | 10 m synchronized platform | 295.38 | 4 Q | —N/a | | 304.86 | 3rd place, bronze medalist(s) |

Mixed

| Athlete | Event | Final | |
| Athlete | Event | Points | Rank |
|---|---|---|---|
| Briadam Herrera; Maria Coburn | 3 m synchronized springboard | 295.95 | 5 |
| Zachary Cooper; Olivia Rosendahl | 10 m synchronized platform | 267.96 | 5 |
| Andrew Capobianco; Katrina Young | Team | 357.60 | 3rd place, bronze medalist(s) |

== High diving ==
Men

| Athlete | Event | Points | Rank |
|---|---|---|---|
| David Colturi | Men's high diving | 343.90 | 10 |
| Andy Jones | Men's high diving | 365.85 | 6 |
| Steven LoBue | Men's high diving | 433.65 | 2nd place, silver medalist(s) |

Women

| Athlete | Event | Points | Rank |
|---|---|---|---|
| Genevieve Bradley | Women's high diving | 280.80 | 4 |
| Ellie Smart | Women's high diving | 209.85 | 10 |

== Open water swimming ==
The United States qualified four male and five female open water swimmers.

Men

| Athlete | Event | Time | Rank |
|---|---|---|---|
| Michael Brinegar | Men's 5 km | 53:37.1 | 12 |
| Brennan Gravley | Men's 5 km | 53:37.8 | 14 |
| Brennan Gravley | Men's 25 km | 4:57:17.5 | 15 |
| David Heron | Men's 10 km | 1:49:57.6 | 25 |
| David Heron | Men's 25 km | 4:55:11.8 | 14 |
| Jordan Wilimovsky | Men's 10 km | 1:48:01.0 | 5 |

Women

| Athlete | Event | Time | Rank |
|---|---|---|---|
| Haley Anderson | Women's 10 km | 1:54:48.1 | 2nd place, silver medalist(s) |
| Katy Campbell | Women's 25 km | 5:11:59.6 | 9 |
| Hannah Moore | Women's 5 km | 57:58.0 | 3rd place, bronze medalist(s) |
| Erica Sullivan | Women's 25 km | 5:11:23.2 | 5 |
| Ashley Twichell | Women's 5 km | 58:00.0 | 7 |
| Ashley Twichell | Women's 10 km | 1:54:50.5 | 6 |

Mixed

| Athlete | Event | Time | Rank |
|---|---|---|---|
| Haley Anderson; Michael Brinegar; Hannah Moore; Jordan Wilimovsky | Team | 53:59.0 | 3rd place, bronze medalist(s) |

== Swimming ==
Men

| Athlete | Event | Heat | | Semifinal | | Final | |
| Athlete | Event | Time | Rank | Time | Rank | Time | Rank |
|---|---|---|---|---|---|---|---|
| Michael Andrew | 50 m backstroke | 24.70 | 2 Q | 24.76 | 7 Q | 24.58 | 5 |
| Michael Andrew | 50 m breaststroke | 27.02 | 11 Q | 26.88 | 7 Q | 26.88 | 7 |
| Michael Andrew | 100 m breaststroke | 1:00.04 | 19 | Did not advance | | | |
| Michael Andrew | 50 m butterfly | 23.09 | 5 Q | 22.95 | 5 Q | 22.80 | 4 |
| Michael Andrew | 50 m freestyle | 21.82 | 7 Q | 21.77 | 8 Q | 21.62 | 6 |
| Jack Conger | 100 m butterfly | 51.96 | 9 Q | 51.91 | 11 | Did not advance | |
| Abrahm DeVine | 200 m individual medley | 1:59.26 | 12 Q | 1:57.91 | 7 Q | 1:57.66 | 8 |
| Caeleb Dressel | 50 m butterfly | 22.84 | =1 Q | 22.57 AM CR | 1 Q | 22.35 AM CR | 1st place, gold medalist(s) |
| Caeleb Dressel | 100 m butterfly | 50.28 | 1 Q | 49.50 WR | 1 Q | 49.66 | 1st place, gold medalist(s) |
| Caeleb Dressel | 50 m freestyle | 21.49 | 1 Q | 21.18 | 1 Q | 21.04 CR NR | 1st place, gold medalist(s) |
| Caeleb Dressel | 100 m freestyle | 47.32 | 1 Q | 47.32 | 1 Q | 46.96 NR | 1st place, gold medalist(s) |
| Matt Grevers | 100 m backstroke | 53.22 | 4 Q | 52.82 | 4 Q | 52.82 | 5 |
| Zane Grothe | 400 m freestyle | 3:45.83 | 6 Q | —N/a | | 3:45.78 | 8 |
| Zane Grothe | 800 m freestyle | 7:50.14 | 11 | —N/a | | Did not advance | |
| Zane Grothe | 1500 m freestyle | 15:21.43 | 26 | —N/a | | Did not advance | |
| Townley Haas | 200 m freestyle | 1:46.85 | 13 Q | 1:46.37 | 14 | Did not advance | |
| Zach Harting | 200 m butterfly | 1:56.42 | 8 Q | 1:55.26 | 2 Q | 1:55.69 | 6 |
| Chase Kalisz | 200 m individual medley | 1:58.20 | 3 Q | 1:57.34 | 4 Q | 1:56.78 | 3rd place, bronze medalist(s) |
| Chase Kalisz | 400 m individual medley | 4:15.62 | 10 | —N/a | | Did not advance | |
| Jay Litherland | 400 m individual medley | 4:13.78 | 3 Q | —N/a | | 4:09.22 | 2nd place, silver medalist(s) |
| Ryan Murphy | 50 m backstroke | 24.93 | 6 Q | 24.64 | 4 Q | 24.53 | 4 |
| Ryan Murphy | 100 m backstroke | 53.69 | 9 Q | 52.44 | =2 Q | 52.78 | 4 |
| Ryan Murphy | 200 m backstroke | 1:56.61 | 1 Q | 1:56.25 | 2 Q | 1:54.12 | 2nd place, silver medalist(s) |
| Jacob Pebley | 200 m backstroke | 1.58.07 | 16 Q | 1:56.65 | 4 Q | 1:56.72 | 6 |
| Blake Pieroni | 100 m freestyle | 48.31 | 5 Q | 47.87 | 5 Q | 47.88 | 4 |
| Josh Prenot | 200 m breaststroke | 2:09.68 | =9 Q | 2:08.77 | 13 | Did not advance | |
| Andrew Seliskar | 200 m freestyle | 1:46.74 | 12 Q | 1:46.83 | 15 | Did not advance | |
| Grant Shoults | 400 m freestyle | 3:52.96 | 25 | —N/a | | Did not advance | |
| Jordan Wilimovsky | 800 m freestyle | 7:53.11 | 16 | —N/a | | Did not advance | |
| Jordan Wilimovsky | 1500 m freestyle | 14:59.94 | 11 | —N/a | | Did not advance | |
| Andrew Wilson | 50 m breaststroke | DNS | | Did not advance | | | |
| Andrew Wilson | 100 m breaststroke | 59.26 | 8 Q | 58.95 | 5 Q | 59.11 | 6 |
| Andrew Wilson | 200 m breaststroke | 2:09.61 | 8 Q | 2:07.86 | 3 Q | 2:08.10 | 6 |
| Justin Wright | 200 m butterfly | 1:57.18 | 18 | Did not advance | | | |
| Nathan Adrian; Zach Apple; Michael Chadwick*; Caeleb Dressel; Townley Haas*; Blake Pieroni | 4×100 m freestyle relay | 3:11.31 | 1 Q | —N/a | | 3:09.06 CR | 1st place, gold medalist(s) |
| Zach Apple; Jack Conger*; Townley Haas; Jack LeVant*; Blake Pieroni; Andrew Seliskar | 4×200 m freestyle relay | 7:06.86 | 3 Q | —N/a | | 7:01.98 | 3rd place, bronze medalist(s) |
| Ryan Murphy; Andrew Wilson; Caeleb Dressel; Nathan Adrian; Matt Grevers*; Michael Andrew*; Jack Conger*; Zach Apple* | 4×100 m medley relay | 3:31.93 | 2 Q | —N/a | | 3:28.45 | 2nd place, silver medalist(s) |

Women

| Athlete | Event | Heat | | Semifinal | | Final | |
| Athlete | Event | Time | Rank | Time | Rank | Time | Rank |
|---|---|---|---|---|---|---|---|
| Kathleen Baker | 50 m backstroke | 28.17 | 11 Q | 27.62 | 1 Q | 27.69 | 6 |
| Kathleen Baker | 100 m backstroke | 59.31 | 4 Q | 59.03 | 4 Q | 59.56 | 6 |
| Kathleen Baker | 200 m backstroke | 2:10.08 | 9 Q | 2:09.68 | 9 | Did not advance | |
| Mallory Comerford | 100 m freestyle | 53.57 | 6 Q | 53.10 | 5 Q | 53.22 | 7 |
| Kelsi Dahlia | 50 m butterfly | 25.70 | 2 Q | 25.59 | 4 Q | 25.48 =AM | 4 |
| Kelsi Dahlia | 100 m butterfly | 57.22 | 5 Q | 57.06 | 7 Q | 57.11 | 6 |
| Katie Drabot | 200 m butterfly | 2:08.33 | 5 Q | 2:06.59 | 2 Q | 2:07.04 | 3rd place, bronze medalist(s) |
| Ella Eastin | 200 m individual medley | 2:11.06 | 8 Q | 2:10.72 | =9 | Did not advance | |
| Hali Flickinger | 200 m butterfly | 2:05.96 | 1 Q | 2:06.25 | 1 Q | 2:06.95 | 2nd place, silver medalist(s) |
| Brooke Forde | 400 m individual medley | 4:39.74 | 9 | —N/a | | Did not advance | |
| Lilly King | 50 m breaststroke | 30.18 | 2 Q | 29.84 | 1 Q | 29.84 | 1st place, gold medalist(s) |
| Lilly King | 100 m breaststroke | 1:06.31 | 1 Q | 1:05.66 | 2 Q | 1:04.93 | 1st place, gold medalist(s) |
| Lilly King | 200 m breaststroke | DSQ | | Did not advance | | | |
| Katie Ledecky | 200 m freestyle | DNS | | Did not advance | | | |
| Katie Ledecky | 400 m freestyle | 4:01.84 | 1 Q | —N/a | | 3:59.97 | 2nd place, silver medalist(s) |
| Katie Ledecky | 800 m freestyle | 8:17.42 | 2 Q | —N/a | | 8:13.58 | 1st place, gold medalist(s) |
| Katie Ledecky | 1500 m freestyle | 15:48.90 | 1 Q | —N/a | | WD | |
| Simone Manuel | 50 m freestyle | 24.41 | 3 Q | 24.21 | 4 Q | 24.05 | 1st place, gold medalist(s) |
| Simone Manuel | 100 m freestyle | 53.10 | 1 Q | 53.31 | =7 Q | 52.04 AM | 1st place, gold medalist(s) |
| Melanie Margalis | 200 m individual medley | 2:09.69 | 3 Q | 2:09.14 | 3 Q | 2:08.91 | 4 |
| Ally McHugh | 400 m individual medley | 4:38.32 | 5 Q | —N/a | | 4:38.34 | 6 |
| Katie McLaughlin | 100 m butterfly | 57.67 | 8 Q | 57.23 | 9 | Did not advance | |
| Allison Schmitt | 200 m freestyle | 1:58.73 | 14 Q | 1:58.27 | 14 | Did not advance | |
| Leah Smith | 400 m freestyle | 4:04.53 | 5 Q | —N/a | | 4:01.29 | 3rd place, bronze medalist(s) |
| Leah Smith | 800 m freestyle | 8:17.23 | 1 Q | —N/a | | 8:17.10 | 5 |
| Regan Smith | 200 m backstroke | 2:06.01 | 1 Q | 2:03.35 | 1 Q WR | 2:03.69 | 1st place, gold medalist(s) |
| Olivia Smoliga | 50 m backstroke | 27.96 | 6 Q | 27.76 | 5 Q | 27.33 NR | 1st place, gold medalist(s) |
| Olivia Smoliga | 100 m backstroke | 59.55 | 5 Q | 59.36 | 6 Q | 58.91 | 3rd place, bronze medalist(s) |
| Micah Sumrall | 100 m breaststroke | 1:07.81 | 16 Q | 1:07.94 | 16 | Did not advance | |
| Micah Sumrall | 200 m breaststroke | 2:25.17 | =8 Q | 2:25.41 | 11 | Did not advance | |
| Ashley Twichell | 1500 m freestyle | 15:56.22 | 5 Q | —N/a | | 15:54.19 | 4 |
| Abbey Weitzeil | 50 m freestyle | 24.47 | 6 Q | 24.58 | 10 | Did not advance | |
| Mallory Comerford; Kelsi Dahlia; Margo Geer*; Simone Manuel; Lia Neal*; Allison Schmitt*; Abbey Weitzeil | 4×100 m freestyle relay | 3:36.13 | 4 Q | —N/a | | 3:31.02 AM | 2nd place, silver medalist(s) |
| Gabby DeLoof*; Katie Ledecky; Simone Manuel; Melanie Margalis; Katie McLaughlin; Allison Schmitt*; Leah Smith* | 4×200 m freestyle relay | 7:51.58 | 2 Q | —N/a | | 7:41.87 AM | 2nd place, silver medalist(s) |
| Regan Smith; Lilly King; Kelsi Dahlia; Simone Manuel; Olivia Smoliga*; Melanie Margalis*; Katie McLaughlin*; Mallory Comerford* | 4×100 m medley relay | 3:55.39 | 1 Q | —N/a | | 3:50.40 WR | 1st place, gold medalist(s) |

Mixed

| Athlete | Event | Heat | | Semifinal | | Final | |
| Athlete | Event | Time | Rank | Time | Rank | Time | Rank |
|---|---|---|---|---|---|---|---|
| Nathan Adrian*; Zach Apple; Mallory Comerford; Caeleb Dressel; Simone Manuel; Katie McLaughlin*; Blake Pieroni*; Abbey Weitzeil* | 4×100 m freestyle relay | 3:22.70 | 1 Q | —N/a | | 3:19.40 WR | 1st place, gold medalist(s) |
| Mallory Comerford*; Kelsi Dahlia*; Caeleb Dressel; Matt Grevers*; Lilly King; Simone Manuel; Ryan Murphy; Andrew Wilson* | 4×100 m medley relay | 3:41.23 | 1 Q | —N/a | | 3:39.10 | 2nd place, silver medalist(s) |

Legend: (*) = Swimmers who participated in the heat only.

== Water polo ==
=== Men's tournament ===
Team roster

- Alex Wolf
- Johnny Hooper
- Marko Vavic
- Alex Obert
- Ben Hallock
- Luca Cupido
- Hannes Daube
- Matthew Farmer
- Alex Bowen
- Chancellor Ramirez
- Jesse Smith (C)
- Max Irving
- Drew Holland
- Coach: Dejan Udovičić

Group play

| Pos | Team | Pld | W | D | L | GF | GA | GD | Pts | Qualification |
|---|---|---|---|---|---|---|---|---|---|---|
| 1 | Croatia | 3 | 3 | 0 | 0 | 52 | 16 | +36 | 6 | Quarterfinals |
| 2 | United States | 3 | 2 | 0 | 1 | 35 | 35 | 0 | 4 | Playoffs |
| 3 | Australia | 3 | 1 | 0 | 2 | 32 | 34 | −2 | 2 | Playoffs |
| 4 | Kazakhstan | 3 | 0 | 0 | 3 | 20 | 54 | −34 | 0 | |

Source: Sportresult
Rules for classification: 1) points; 2) head-to-head points; 3) head-to-head goal difference; 4) head-to-head number of goals scored; 5) Goal difference.

| 15 July 2019; 11:10 | Report | United States | 16–7 | Kazakhstan | Nambu University Aquatics Center, Gwangju; Referees: Boris Margeta (SLO), Georgios Stavridis (GRE) |
| 15 July 2019; 11:10 | Report | Score by quarters: 4–1, 4–2, 3–2, 5–2 | | | Nambu University Aquatics Center, Gwangju; Referees: Boris Margeta (SLO), Georgios Stavridis (GRE) |
| 15 July 2019; 11:10 | Report | four players 3 | Goals | seven players 1 | Nambu University Aquatics Center, Gwangju; Referees: Boris Margeta (SLO), Georgios Stavridis (GRE) |

| 17 July 2019; 09:50 | Report | United States | 7–17 | Croatia | Nambu University Aquatics Center, Gwangju; Referees: Michiel Zwart (NED), Daniel Flahive (AUS) |
| 17 July 2019; 09:50 | Report | Score by quarters: 1–4, 3–5, 2–4, 1–4 | | | Nambu University Aquatics Center, Gwangju; Referees: Michiel Zwart (NED), Daniel Flahive (AUS) |
| 17 July 2019; 09:50 | Report | Ramirez 2 | Goals | four players 3 | Nambu University Aquatics Center, Gwangju; Referees: Michiel Zwart (NED), Daniel Flahive (AUS) |

| 19 July 2019; 19:10 | Report | United States | 12–11 | Australia | Nambu University Aquatics Center, Gwangju; Referees: Adrian Alxandrescu (ROU), Arkadiy Voevodin (RUS) |
| 19 July 2019; 19:10 | Report | Score by quarters: 4–3, 3–3, 2–2, 3–3 | | | Nambu University Aquatics Center, Gwangju; Referees: Adrian Alxandrescu (ROU), Arkadiy Voevodin (RUS) |
| 19 July 2019; 19:10 | Report | Cupido 3 | Goals | four players 2 | Nambu University Aquatics Center, Gwangju; Referees: Adrian Alxandrescu (ROU), Arkadiy Voevodin (RUS) |

Playoffs

| 21 July 2019; 15:30 | Report | Greece | 11–9 | United States | Nambu University Aquatics Center, Gwangju; Referees: Germán Moller (ARG), Sebastien Dervieux (FRA) |
| 21 July 2019; 15:30 | Report | Score by quarters: 3–4, 3–2, 2–2, 3–1 | | | Nambu University Aquatics Center, Gwangju; Referees: Germán Moller (ARG), Sebastien Dervieux (FRA) |
| 21 July 2019; 15:30 | Report | Genidounias 4 | Goals | three players 2 | Nambu University Aquatics Center, Gwangju; Referees: Germán Moller (ARG), Sebastien Dervieux (FRA) |

9th–12th place semifinals

| 23 July 2019; 12:30 | Report | United States | 20–3 | South Africa | Nambu University Aquatics Center, Gwangju; Referees: Jeremy Cheng (SGP), Daniel Flahive (AUS) |
| 23 July 2019; 12:30 | Report | Score by quarters: 5–0, 8–1, 5–2, 2–0 | | | Nambu University Aquatics Center, Gwangju; Referees: Jeremy Cheng (SGP), Daniel Flahive (AUS) |
| 23 July 2019; 12:30 | Report | three players 4 | Goals | three players 1 | Nambu University Aquatics Center, Gwangju; Referees: Jeremy Cheng (SGP), Daniel Flahive (AUS) |

9th place game

| 25 July 2019; 11:00 | Report | Montenegro | 14–15 | United States | Nambu University Aquatics Center, Gwangju; Referees: Frank Ohme (GER), Daniel Flahive (AUS) |
| 25 July 2019; 11:00 | Report | Score by quarters: 2–4, 6–4, 4–4, 2–3 | | | Nambu University Aquatics Center, Gwangju; Referees: Frank Ohme (GER), Daniel Flahive (AUS) |
| 25 July 2019; 11:00 | Report | Ivović 6 | Goals | Hooper 4 | Nambu University Aquatics Center, Gwangju; Referees: Frank Ohme (GER), Daniel Flahive (AUS) |

=== Women's tournament ===
Team roster

- Amanda Longan
- Maddie Musselman
- Melissa Seidemann
- Rachel Fattal
- Paige Hauschild
- Margaret Steffens (C)
- Stephania Haralabidis
- Kiley Neushul
- Aria Fischer
- Kaleigh Gilchrist
- Makenzie Fischer
- Alys Williams
- Ashleigh Johnson
- Coach: Adam Krikorian

Group play

| Pos | Team | Pld | W | D | L | GF | GA | GD | Pts | Qualification |
|---|---|---|---|---|---|---|---|---|---|---|
| 1 | United States | 3 | 3 | 0 | 0 | 60 | 13 | +47 | 6 | Quarterfinals |
| 2 | Netherlands | 3 | 2 | 0 | 1 | 57 | 18 | +39 | 4 | Playoffs |
| 3 | New Zealand | 3 | 1 | 0 | 2 | 26 | 41 | −15 | 2 | Playoffs |
| 4 | South Africa | 3 | 0 | 0 | 3 | 5 | 76 | −71 | 0 | |

Source: Sportresult
Rules for classification: 1) points; 2) head-to-head points; 3) head-to-head goal difference; 4) head-to-head number of goals scored; 5) Goal difference.

| 14 July 2019; 09:50 | Report | New Zealand | 3–22 | United States | Nambu University Aquatics Center, Gwangju; Referees: Jaume Teixido (ESP), Stanko Ivanovski (MNE) |
| 14 July 2019; 09:50 | Report | Score by quarters: 0–8, 1–4, 0–6, 2–4 | | | Nambu University Aquatics Center, Gwangju; Referees: Jaume Teixido (ESP), Stanko Ivanovski (MNE) |
| 14 July 2019; 09:50 | Report | Doyle 2 | Goals | Haralabidis 5 | Nambu University Aquatics Center, Gwangju; Referees: Jaume Teixido (ESP), Stanko Ivanovski (MNE) |

| 16 July 2019; 19:10 | Report | United States | 12–9 | Netherlands | Nambu University Aquatics Center, Gwangju; Referees: Sebastien Dervieux (FRA), Vojin Putniković (SRB) |
| 16 July 2019; 19:10 | Report | Score by quarters: 3–2, 1–2, 4–3, 4–2 | | | Nambu University Aquatics Center, Gwangju; Referees: Sebastien Dervieux (FRA), Vojin Putniković (SRB) |
| 16 July 2019; 19:10 | Report | Gilchrist, Musselman 3 | Goals | Keuning 2 | Nambu University Aquatics Center, Gwangju; Referees: Sebastien Dervieux (FRA), Vojin Putniković (SRB) |

| 18 July 2019; 16:30 | Report | South Africa | 1–26 | United States | Nambu University Aquatics Center, Gwangju; Referees: Alessandro Severo (ITA), An Jin-yong (KOR) |
| 18 July 2019; 16:30 | Report | Score by quarters: 0–7, 1–8, 0–6, 0–5 | | | Nambu University Aquatics Center, Gwangju; Referees: Alessandro Severo (ITA), An Jin-yong (KOR) |
| 18 July 2019; 16:30 | Report | Meecham 1 | Goals | Musselman 5 | Nambu University Aquatics Center, Gwangju; Referees: Alessandro Severo (ITA), An Jin-yong (KOR) |

Quarterfinals

| 22 July 2019; 14:00 | Report | United States | 15–5 | Greece | Nambu University Aquatics Center, Gwangju; Referees: Gabriella Várkonyi (HUN), Jaume Teixidó (ESP) |
| 22 July 2019; 14:00 | Report | Score by quarters: 4–0, 4–2, 2–2, 5–1 | | | Nambu University Aquatics Center, Gwangju; Referees: Gabriella Várkonyi (HUN), Jaume Teixidó (ESP) |
| 22 July 2019; 14:00 | Report | Musselman 4 | Goals | Eleftheriadou, Xenaki 2 | Nambu University Aquatics Center, Gwangju; Referees: Gabriella Várkonyi (HUN), Jaume Teixidó (ESP) |

Semifinals

| 24 July 2019; 17:00 | Report | United States | 7–2 | Australia | Nambu University Aquatics Center, Gwangju; Referees: Nenad Peris (CRO), Adrian Alexandrescu (ROU) |
| 24 July 2019; 17:00 | Report | Score by quarters: 3–0, 2–0, 1–1, 1–1 | | | Nambu University Aquatics Center, Gwangju; Referees: Nenad Peris (CRO), Adrian Alexandrescu (ROU) |
| 24 July 2019; 17:00 | Report | three players 2 | Goals | Halligan, Webster 1 | Nambu University Aquatics Center, Gwangju; Referees: Nenad Peris (CRO), Adrian Alexandrescu (ROU) |

Gold medal final

| 26 July 2019; 18:30 | Report | United States | 11–6 | Spain | Nambu University Aquatics Center, Gwangju; Referees: Michiel Zwart (NED), Nenad Peris (CRO) |
| 26 July 2019; 18:30 | Report | Score by quarters: 3–1, 2–2, 4–0, 2–3 | | | Nambu University Aquatics Center, Gwangju; Referees: Michiel Zwart (NED), Nenad Peris (CRO) |
| 26 July 2019; 18:30 | Report | Neushul 3 | Goals | Tarragó 3 | Nambu University Aquatics Center, Gwangju; Referees: Michiel Zwart (NED), Nenad Peris (CRO) |
