= Diving at the 2019 World Aquatics Championships – Men's synchronized 3 metre springboard =

Men's synchronized 3 metre springboard at the 2019 World Aquatics Championships
- Venue: Nambu University Municipal Aquatics Center
- Location: Gwangju, South Korea
- Dates: 13 July
- Competitors: 50 from 25 nations
- Teams: 25
- Winning points: 439.74

Medalists
gold medal	Cao Yuan; Xie Siyi	China
silver medal	Daniel Goodfellow; Jack Laugher	Great Britain
bronze medal	Yahel Castillo; Juan Celaya	Mexico

The Men's synchronized 3 metre springboard competition at the 2019 World Aquatics Championships was held on 13 July 2019.

== Results ==
The preliminary round was started at 10:00. The final was started at 20:45.

Green denotes finalists

Rank	Nation	Divers	Preliminary		Final	
Rank	Nation	Divers	Points	Rank	Points	Rank
1st place, gold medalist(s)	China	Cao Yuan; Xie Siyi	447.18	1	439.74	1
2nd place, silver medalist(s)	Great Britain	Daniel Goodfellow; Jack Laugher	377.22	4	415.02	2
3rd place, bronze medalist(s)	Mexico	Yahel Castillo; Juan Celaya	366.60	9	413.94	3
4	Germany	Patrick Hausding; Lars Rüdiger	376.44	6	399.87	4
5	Russia	Evgeny Kuznetsov; Nikita Shleikher	345.00	12	396.81	5
6	Ukraine	Oleksandr Horshkovozov; Oleh Kolodiy	378.03	3	393.24	6
7	Japan	Sho Sakai; Ken Terauchi	384.09	2	389.43	7
8	United States	Andrew Capobianco; Mike Hixon	374.97	7	388.08	8
9	Colombia	Sebastián Morales; Daniel Restrepo	367.44	8	381.36	9
10	South Korea	Kim Yeong-nam; Woo Ha-ram	376.47	5	372.33	10
11	Poland	Kacper Lesiak; Andrzej Rzeszutek	350.28	10	360.69	11
12	Malaysia	Chew Yiwei; Ooi Tze Liang	348.00	11	357.30	12
13	France	Gwendal Bisch; Alexis Jandard	344.16	13	did not advance	
14	Australia	Matthew Carter; Li Shixin	338.40	14	did not advance	
15	Dominican Republic	Frandiel Gómez; José Ruvalcaba	335.25	15	did not advance	
16	Switzerland	Guillaume Dutoit; Simon Rieckhoff	330.60	16	did not advance	
17	Italy	Lorenzo Marsaglia; Giovanni Tocci	320.64	17	did not advance	
18	New Zealand	Anton Down-Jenkins; Liam Stone	319.29	18	did not advance	
19	Singapore	Timothy Lee; Mark Lee	314.91	19	did not advance	
20	Kuwait	Abdulrahman Abbas; Hasan Qali	307.77	20	did not advance	
21	Brazil	Luis Bonfim; Kawan Figueredo	297.15	21	did not advance	
22	Egypt	Youssef Ezzat; Ammar Hassan	294.63	22	did not advance	
23	Georgia	Sandro Melikidze; Tornike Onikashvili	292.71	23	did not advance	
24	Cuba	Angello Alcebo; Laydel Domínguez	267.72	24	did not advance	
25	Canada	Philippe Gagné; François Imbeau-Dulac	182.94	25	did not advance	
