= Diving at the 2019 World Aquatics Championships – Women's 10 metre platform =

Women's 10 metre platform at the 2019 World Aquatics Championships
- Venue: Nambu University Municipal Aquatics Center
- Location: Gwangju, South Korea
- Dates: 16–17 July
- Competitors: 38 from 24 nations
- Winning points: 439.00

Medalists
gold medal	Chen Yuxi	China
silver medal	Lu Wei	China
bronze medal	Delaney Schnell	United States

The Women's 10 metre platform competition at the 2019 World Aquatics Championships was held on 16 and 17 July 2019.

== Results ==
The preliminary round was started on 16 July at 10:00. The semifinal was started on 16 July at 15:30. The final was started on 17 July at 20:45.

Green denotes finalists

Blue denotes semifinalists

Rank	Diver	Nationality	Preliminary		Semifinal		Final	
Rank	Diver	Nationality	Points	Rank	Points	Rank	Points	Rank
1st place, gold medalist(s)	Chen Yuxi	China	339.80	4	407.95	1	439.00	1
2nd place, silver medalist(s)	Lu Wei	China	383.75	1	370.85	2	377.80	2
3rd place, bronze medalist(s)	Delaney Schnell	United States	305.75	10	317.35	8	364.20	3
4	Melissa Wu	Australia	343.70	3	322.50	6	360.20	4
5	Pandelela Rinong	Malaysia	303.70	12	312.70	9	349.25	5
6	Meaghan Benfeito	Canada	344.60	2	340.60	4	347.80	6
7	Caeli McKay	Canada	315.85	8	356.70	3	331.40	7
8	Noemi Batki	Italy	321.10	6	328.60	5	328.90	8
9	Matsuri Arai	Japan	304.75	11	312.45	10	321.45	9
10	Celine van Duijn	Netherlands	301.50	13	309.55	11	309.40	10
11	Amy Cozad	United States	318.10	7	308.50	12	305.00	11
12	Lois Toulson	Great Britain	311.90	9	319.60	7	303.60	12
13	Alejandra Orozco	Mexico	281.35	17	303.90	13	Did not advance	
14	Christina Wassen	Germany	298.80	14	298.90	14	Did not advance	
15	Robyn Birch	Great Britain	288.50	15	297.00	15	Did not advance	
16	Maria Kurjo	Germany	285.45	16	295.55	16	Did not advance	
17	Rin Kaneto	Japan	333.95	5	285.05	17	Did not advance	
18	Laura Hingston	Australia	281.00	18	283.70	18	Did not advance	
19	Antonia Pavel	Romania	273.90	19	Did not advance			
20	Freida Lim	Singapore	270.30	20	Did not advance			
21	Anisley García	Cuba	269.60	21	Did not advance			
22	Moon Na-yun	South Korea	268.50	22	Did not advance			
23	Cho Eun-bi	South Korea	263.45	23	Did not advance			
24	Maha Abdelsalam	Egypt	260.85	24	Did not advance			
25	Ellen Ek	Sweden	256.20	25	Did not advance			
26	Alais Kalonji	France	252.60	26	Did not advance			
27	Helle Tuxen	Norway	240.05	27	Did not advance			
28	Nicoleta Muscalu	Romania	239.65	28	Did not advance			
29	Tanya Watson	Ireland	237.00	29	Did not advance			
30	Anna Chuinyshena	Russia	235.30	30	Did not advance			
31	Yulia Timoshinina	Russia	233.25	31	Did not advance			
32	Gabriela Agúndez	Mexico	219.45	32	Did not advance			
33	Myra Lee	Singapore	205.20	33	Did not advance			
34	Viviana Uribe	Colombia	201.90	34	Did not advance			
35	María Betancourt	Venezuela	199.10	35	Did not advance			
36	Andressa Mendes	Brazil	195.80	36	Did not advance			
37	Anne Tuxen	Norway	180.70	37	Did not advance			
38	Valentina Quintero	Colombia	151.50	38	Did not advance			
