= Diving at the 2019 World Aquatics Championships – Men's 1 metre springboard =

Men's 1 metre springboard at the 2019 World Aquatics Championships
- Venue: Nambu University Municipal Aquatics Center
- Location: Gwangju, South Korea
- Dates: 12–14 July
- Competitors: 44 from 28 nations
- Winning points: 429.40

Medalists
| gold medal | Wang Zongyuan | China |
| silver medal | Rommel Pacheco | Mexico |
| bronze medal | Peng Jianfeng | China |

The Men's 1 metre springboard competition at the 2019 World Aquatics Championships was held on 12 and 14 July 2019.

== Results ==
The preliminary round was started on 12 July at 11:00. The final was started on 14 July at 15:30.

Green denotes finalists

| Rank | Diver | Nationality | Preliminary | | Final | |
| Rank | Diver | Nationality | Points | Rank | Points | Rank |
|---|---|---|---|---|---|---|
| 1st place, gold medalist(s) | Wang Zongyuan | China | 429.40 | 1 | 440.25 | 1 |
| 2nd place, silver medalist(s) | Rommel Pacheco | Mexico | 390.40 | 4 | 420.15 | 2 |
| 3rd place, bronze medalist(s) | Peng Jianfeng | China | 410.80 | 2 | 415.00 | 3 |
| 4 | Woo Ha-ram | South Korea | 396.10 | 3 | 406.15 | 4 |
| 5 | Patrick Hausding | Germany | 357.20 | 9 | 405.05 | 5 |
| 6 | Briadam Herrera | United States | 365.25 | 6 | 399.90 | 6 |
| 7 | Oleh Kolodiy | Ukraine | 370.40 | 5 | 396.40 | 7 |
| 8 | Kacper Lesiak | Poland | 358.70 | 7 | 380.05 | 8 |
| 9 | James Heatly | Great Britain | 355.35 | 10 | 372.15 | 9 |
| 10 | Yona Knight-Wisdom | Jamaica | 354.30 | 11 | 371.90 | 10 |
| 11 | Rafael Quintero | Puerto Rico | 352.00 | 12 | 360.80 | 11 |
| 12 | Giovanni Tocci | Italy | 357.50 | 8 | 344.25 | 12 |
| 13 | Kim Yeong-nam | South Korea | 349.10 | 13 | did not advance | |
| 14 | Jonathan Suckow | Switzerland | 346.60 | 14 | did not advance | |
| 15 | Li Shixin | Australia | 338.60 | 15 | did not advance | |
| 16 | Gwendal Bisch | France | 331.35 | 16 | did not advance | |
| 17 | Mike Hixon | United States | 330.00 | 17 | did not advance | |
| 18 | Daniel Restrepo | Colombia | 328.05 | 18 | did not advance | |
| 19 | Nicolás García | Spain | 327.50 | 19 | did not advance | |
| 20 | Vinko Paradzik | Sweden | 326.40 | 20 | did not advance | |
| 21 | Jahir Ocampo | Mexico | 324.30 | 21 | did not advance | |
| 22 | Kawan Pereira | Brazil | 323.40 | 22 | did not advance | |
| 23 | Ross Haslam | Great Britain | 322.90 | 23 | did not advance | |
| 24 | Kevin Chávez | Australia | 322.25 | 24 | did not advance | |
| 24 | Adrián Abadía | Spain | 322.25 | 24 | did not advance | |
| 26 | Lorenzo Marsaglia | Italy | 320.45 | 26 | did not advance | |
| 27 | Oliver Dingley | Ireland | 314.40 | 27 | did not advance | |
| 28 | Simon Rieckhoff | Switzerland | 314.25 | 28 | did not advance | |
| 29 | Sergey Nazin | Russia | 303.45 | 29 | did not advance | |
| 30 | Andrzej Rzeszutek | Poland | 296.25 | 30 | did not advance | |
| 31 | Sebastián Morales | Colombia | 295.10 | 31 | did not advance | |
| 32 | Alexis Jandard | France | 292.15 | 32 | did not advance | |
| 33 | Muhammad Puteh | Malaysia | 283.20 | 33 | did not advance | |
| 34 | Frithjof Seidel | Germany | 277.80 | 34 | did not advance | |
| 35 | Stanislav Oliferchyk | Ukraine | 274.05 | 35 | did not advance | |
| 36 | Sulaiman Al-Sabe | Kuwait | 273.90 | 36 | did not advance | |
| 37 | Luis Moura | Brazil | 264.45 | 37 | did not advance | |
| 38 | Frandiel Gómez | Dominican Republic | 258.90 | 38 | did not advance | |
| 39 | Ammar Hassan | Egypt | 253.65 | 39 | did not advance | |
| 40 | Angello Alcebo | Cuba | 241.65 | 40 | did not advance | |
| 41 | Diego Carquin | Chile | 241.00 | 41 | did not advance | |
| 42 | Juraj Melša | Croatia | 231.60 | 42 | did not advance | |
| 43 | Hasan Qali | Kuwait | 207.35 | 43 | did not advance | |
| 44 | Rungsiman Yanmongkon | Thailand | 141.25 | 44 | did not advance | |
