= Diving at the 2019 World Aquatics Championships – Men's synchronized 10 metre platform =

2019 10meter platform competition

Men's synchronized 10 metre platform at the 2019 World Aquatics Championships
- Venue: Nambu University Municipal Aquatics Center
- Location: Gwangju, South Korea
- Dates: 15 July
- Competitors: 34 from 17 nations
- Teams: 17
- Winning points: 486.93

Medalists
gold medal	Cao Yuan; Chen Aisen	China
silver medal	Aleksandr Bondar; Viktor Minibaev	Russia
bronze medal	Tom Daley; Matty Lee	Great Britain

The Men's synchronized 10 metre platform competition at the 2019 World Aquatics Championships was held on 15 July 2019.

== Results ==
The preliminary round was started at 13:00. The final was held at 20:45.

Green denotes finalists

Rank	Nation	Divers	Preliminary		Final	
Rank	Nation	Divers	Points	Rank	Points	Rank
1st place, gold medalist(s)	China	Cao Yuan; Chen Aisen	460.29	1	486.93	1
2nd place, silver medalist(s)	Russia	Aleksandr Bondar; Viktor Minibaev	407.37	3	444.60	2
3rd place, bronze medalist(s)	Great Britain	Tom Daley; Matty Lee	416.28	2	425.91	3
4	Ukraine	Oleh Serbin; Oleksii Sereda	339.21	11	412.62	4
5	Australia	Domonic Bedggood; Declan Stacey	370.29	9	411.24	5
6	South Korea	Kim Yeong-nam; Woo Ha-ram	377.91	7	401.67	6
7	Mexico	Kevin Berlin; Ivan García	387.33	5	400.71	7
8	United States	Benjamin Bramley; Steele Johnson	373.80	8	383.79	8
9	Armenia	Vladimir Harutyunyan; Lev Sargsyan	336.48	12	372.48	9
10	Germany	Timo Barthel; Lou Massenberg	378.96	6	368.25	10
11	Canada	Vincent Riendeau; Nathan Zsombor-Murray	397.38	4	368.19	11
12	Brazil	Kawan Pereira; Isaac Filho	342.06	10	348.78	12
13	Malaysia	Jellson Jabillin; Hanis Jaya	333.90	13	did not advance	
14	Greece	Nikolaos Molvalis; Athanasios Tsirikos	332.64	14	did not advance	
15	Dominican Republic	Frandiel Gómez; José Ruvalcaba	330.99	15	did not advance	
16	Thailand	Conrad Lewandowski; Thitipoom Marksin	277.86	16	did not advance	
17	Uzbekistan	Botir Khasanov; Marsel Zaynetdinov	255.45	17	did not advance	
