= China at the 2019 World Aquatics Championships =

- Flag of China
- World Aquatics code: CHN
- National federation: Chinese Swimming Association
- Website: swimming.org.cn

in Gwangju, South Korea
- Medals Ranked 1st: Gold 16 Silver 11 Bronze 3 Total 30

World Aquatics Championships appearances
- 1973; 1975; 1978; 1982; 1986; 1991; 1994; 1998; 2001; 2003; 2005; 2007; 2009; 2011; 2013; 2015; 2017; 2019; 2022; 2023; 2024; 2025

China competed at the 2019 World Aquatics Championships in Gwangju, South Korea from 12 to 28 July 2019.

== Medalists ==
| Medal | Name | Sport | Event | Date |
|---|---|---|---|---|
| Gold | Lian Junjie; Si Yajie | Diving | Mixed synchronized 10 m platform | 13 July |
| Gold | Chen Yiwen | Diving | Women's 1 m springboard | 13 July |
| Gold | Cao Yuan; Xie Siyi | Diving | Men's synchronized 3 m springboard | 13 July |
| Gold | Xin Xin | Open water swimming | Women's 10 km | 14 July |
| Gold | Wang Zongyuan | Diving | Men's 1 m springboard | 14 July |
| Gold | Lu Wei; Zhang Jiaqi | Diving | Women's synchronized 10 m platform | 14 July |
| Gold | Shi Tingmao; Wang Han | Diving | Women's synchronized 3 m springboard | 15 July |
| Gold | Cao Yuan; Chen Aisen | Diving | Men's synchronized 10 m platform | 15 July |
| Gold | Yang Jian; Lin Shan | Diving | Team event | 16 July |
| Gold | Chen Yuxi | Diving | Women's 10 m platform | 17 July |
| Gold | Xie Siyi | Diving | Men's 3 m springboard | 18 July |
| Gold | Shi Tingmao | Diving | Women's 3 m springboard | 19 July |
| Gold | Yang Jian | Diving | Men's 10 m platform | 20 July |
| Gold | Sun Yang | Swimming | Men's 400 m freestyle | 21 July |
| Gold | Sun Yang | Swimming | Men's 200 m freestyle | 23 July |
| Gold | Xu Jiayu | Swimming | Men's 100 m backstroke | 23 July |
| Silver | Huang Xuechen; Sun Wenyan | Artistic swimming | Duet technical routine | 14 July |
| Silver | Feng Yu; Guo Li; Huang Xuechen; Liang Xinping; Sun Wenyan; Wang Qianyi; Xiao Yanning; Yin Chengxin | Artistic swimming | Team technical routine | 16 July |
| Silver | Lu Wei | Diving | Women's 10 m platform | 17 July |
| Silver | Huang Xuechen; Sun Wenyan | Artistic swimming | Duet free routine | 18 July |
| Silver | Cao Yuan | Diving | Men's 3 m springboard | 18 July |
| Silver | Chang Hao; Feng Yu; Guo Li; Huang Xuechen; Liang Xinping; Sun Wenyan; Xiao Yanning; Yin Chengxin | Artistic swimming | Team free routine | 19 July |
| Silver | Wang Han | Diving | Women's 3 m springboard | 19 July |
| Silver | Chang Hao; Cheng Wentao; Feng Yu; Guo Li; Liang Xinping; Sun Wenyan; Tang Mengni; Wang Qianyi; Xiao Yanning; Yin Chengxin | Artistic swimming | Free routine combination | 20 July |
| Silver | Yang Hao | Diving | Men's 10 m platform | 20 July |
| Silver | Ye Shiwen | Swimming | Women's 200 m individual medley | 22 July |
| Silver | Ye Shiwen | Swimming | Women's 400 m individual medley | 28 July |
| Bronze | Peng Jianfeng | Diving | Men's 1 m springboard | 14 July |
| Bronze | Yan Zibei | Swimming | Men's 100 m breaststroke | 22 July |
| Bronze | Wang Jianjiahe | Swimming | Women's 1500 m freestyle | 23 July |

== Artistic swimming ==
China's artistic swimming team consisted of 14 athletes (13 female and 1 male).

Women

| Athlete | Event | Preliminaries | | Final | |
| Athlete | Event | Points | Rank | Points | Rank |
|---|---|---|---|---|---|
| Huang Xuechen; Sun Wenyan; Feng Yu (R) | Duet technical routine | 93.4148 | 2 Q | 94.0072 | 2nd place, silver medalist(s) |
| Huang Xuechen; Sun Wenyan; Feng Yu (R) | Duet free routine | 94.5333 | 2 Q | 95.7667 | 2nd place, silver medalist(s) |
| Feng Yu; Guo Li; Huang Xuechen; Liang Xinping; Sun Wenyan; Wang Qianyi; Xiao Yanning; Yin Chengxin; Chang Hao (R); Tang Mengni (R) | Team technical routine | 94.3638 | 2 Q | 95.1543 | 2nd place, silver medalist(s) |
| Chang Hao; Feng Yu; Guo Li; Huang Xuechen; Liang Xinping; Sun Wenyan; Xiao Yanning; Yin Chengxin; Tang Mengni (R); Wang Qianyi (R) | Team free routine | 95.7667 | 2 Q | 96.0333 | 2nd place, silver medalist(s) |
| Chang Hao; Cheng Wentao; Feng Yu; Guo Li; Liang Xinping; Sun Wenyan; Tang Mengni; Wang Qianyi; Xiao Yanning; Yin Chengxin; Dai Shiyi (R); Huang Xuechen (R) | Free routine combination | 96.0000 | 2 Q | 96.5667 | 2nd place, silver medalist(s) |

Mixed

| Athlete | Event | Preliminaries | | Final | |
| Athlete | Event | Points | Rank | Points | Rank |
|---|---|---|---|---|---|
| Shi Haoyu; Zhang Yayi | Duet technical routine | 85.2740 | 5 Q | 85.5881 | 5 |
| Cheng Wentao; Shi Haoyu | Duet free routine | 85.7000 | 6 Q | 85.6667 | 6 |

Legend: (R) = Reserve Athlete

== Diving ==
Men

| Athlete | Event | Preliminaries | | Semifinals | | Final | |
| Athlete | Event | Points | Rank | Points | Rank | Points | Rank |
|---|---|---|---|---|---|---|---|
| Peng Jianfeng | 1 m springboard | 410.80 | 2 Q | —N/a | | 415.00 | 3rd place, bronze medalist(s) |
| Wang Zongyuan | 1 m springboard | 429.40 | 1 Q | —N/a | | 440.25 | 1st place, gold medalist(s) |
| Cao Yuan | 3 m springboard | 451.35 | 4 Q | 469.30 | 2 Q | 517.85 | 2nd place, silver medalist(s) |
| Xie Siyi | 3 m springboard | 499.15 | 1 Q | 522.60 | 1 Q | 545.45 | 1st place, gold medalist(s) |
| Yang Hao | 10 m platform | 503.20 | 3 Q | 572.30 | 2 Q | 585.75 | 2nd place, silver medalist(s) |
| Yang Jian | 10 m platform | 530.10 | 1 Q | 573.35 | 1 Q | 598.65 | 1st place, gold medalist(s) |
| Cao Yuan; Xie Siyi | 3 m synchronized springboard | 447.18 | 1 Q | —N/a | | 439.74 | 1st place, gold medalist(s) |
| Cao Yuan; Chen Aisen | 10 m synchronized platform | 460.29 | 1 Q | —N/a | | 486.93 | 1st place, gold medalist(s) |

Women

| Athlete | Event | Preliminaries | | Semifinals | | Final | |
| Athlete | Event | Points | Rank | Points | Rank | Points | Rank |
|---|---|---|---|---|---|---|---|
| Chang Yani | 1 m springboard | 257.65 | 2 Q | —N/a | | 241.70 | 9 |
| Chen Yiwen | 1 m springboard | 287.95 | 1 Q | —N/a | | 285.45 | 1st place, gold medalist(s) |
| Shi Tingmao | 3 m springboard | 357.90 | 1 Q | 359.40 | 1 Q | 391.00 | 1st place, gold medalist(s) |
| Wang Han | 3 m springboard | 356.40 | 2 Q | 345.80 | 3 Q | 372.85 | 2nd place, silver medalist(s) |
| Chen Yuxi | 10 m platform | 339.80 | 4 Q | 407.95 | 1 Q | 439.00 | 1st place, gold medalist(s) |
| Lu Wei | 10 m platform | 383.75 | 1 Q | 370.85 | 2 Q | 377.80 | 2nd place, silver medalist(s) |
| Shi Tingmao; Wang Han | 3 m synchronized springboard | 309.90 | 1 Q | —N/a | | 342.00 | 1st place, gold medalist(s) |
| Lu Wei; Zhang Jiaqi | 10 m synchronized platform | 317.82 | 1 Q | —N/a | | 345.24 | 1st place, gold medalist(s) |

Mixed

| Athlete | Event | Final | |
| Athlete | Event | Points | Rank |
|---|---|---|---|
| Yang Hao; Chang Yani | 3 m synchronized springboard | —N/a | DNS |
| Lian Junjie; Si Yajie | 10 m synchronized platform | 346.14 | 1st place, gold medalist(s) |
| Yang Jian; Lin Shan | Team | 416.65 | 1st place, gold medalist(s) |

Legend: DNS = Did not start

== Open water swimming ==
China qualified six male and six female open water swimmers.

Men

| Athlete | Event | Time | Rank |
|---|---|---|---|
| An Jiabao | Men's 10 km | 1:50:14.0 | 29 |
| Cheng Long | Men's 5 km | 54:18.7 | 45 |
| Lu Mingyu | Men's 25 km | 5:15:20.6 | 19 |
| Qiao Zhongyi | Men's 5 km | 53:37.6 | 13 |
| Wang Ruoyu | Men's 25 km | 5:15:29.3 | 20 |
| Zhao Junbohang | Men's 10 km | 1:52:52.7 | 54 |

Women

| Athlete | Event | Time | Rank |
|---|---|---|---|
| Dong Fuwei | Women's 10 km | 1:54:56.7 | 14 |
| Hou Yawen | Women's 5 km | 58:00.9 | 8 |
| Qu Fang | Women's 25 km | 5:59:12.3 | 16 |
| Ren Luomeng | Women's 25 km | 5:32:13.1 | 14 |
| Xin Xin | Women's 10 km | 1:54:47.2 | 1st place, gold medalist(s) |
| Yan Siyu | Women's 5 km | 58:17.6 | 23 |

Mixed

| Athlete | Event | Time | Rank |
|---|---|---|---|
| An Jiabao; Cheng Long; Hou Yawen; Xin Xin | Team | 55:14.8 | 9 |

== Swimming ==
Men

| Athlete | Event | Heat | | Semifinal | | Final | |
| Athlete | Event | Time | Rank | Time | Rank | Time | Rank |
|---|---|---|---|---|---|---|---|
| Cui Junming | 50 m butterfly | 23.80 | 23 | Did not advance | | | |
| He Junyi | 100 m freestyle | 48.76 | =14 Q | 48.67 | 15 | Did not advance | |
| Ji Xinjie | 200 m freestyle | 1:46.62 | 10 Q | 1:45.88 | 10 | Did not advance | |
| Ji Xinjie | 400 m freestyle | 3:46.34 | 8 Q | —N/a | | 3:45.64 | 7 |
| Ji Xinjie | 1500 m freestyle | 15:15.41 | 21 | —N/a | | Did not advance | |
| Li Guangyuan | 100 m backstroke | 54.29 | 22 | Did not advance | | | |
| Li Guangyuan | 200 m backstroke | 1:58.57 | 21 | Did not advance | | | |
| Li Zhuhao | 100 m butterfly | 52.44 | =14 Q | 52.00 | 13 | Did not advance | |
| Li Zhuhao | 200 m butterfly | 2:01.84 | 37 | Did not advance | | | |
| Qin Haiyang | 200 m breaststroke | 2:09.86 | 12 Q | 2:09.11 | 14 | Did not advance | |
| Sun Yang | 200 m freestyle | 1:46.22 | 2 Q | 1:45.31 | 2 Q | 1:44.93 | 1st place, gold medalist(s) |
| Sun Yang | 400 m freestyle | 3:44.10 | 1 Q | —N/a | | 3:42.44 | 1st place, gold medalist(s) |
| Sun Yang | 800 m freestyle | 7:48.12 | 8 Q | —N/a | | 7:45.01 | 6 |
| Wang Lizhuo | 50 m breaststroke | 27.39 | 18 | Did not advance | | | |
| Wang Lizhuo | 100 m breaststroke | 59.44 | 12 Q | 59.79 | 15 | Did not advance | |
| Wang Peng | 50 m backstroke | 25.79 | 33 | Did not advance | | | |
| Wang Shun | 200 m individual medley | 1:59.18 | 11 Q | 1:57.98 | 8 Q | 1:56.97 | 6 |
| Wang Shun | 400 m individual medley | 4:23.23 | 23 | —N/a | | Did not advance | |
| Wang Yizhe | 400 m individual medley | 4:31.14 | 34 | —N/a | | Did not advance | |
| Wang Zhou | 200 m butterfly | 2:03.07 | 40 | Did not advance | | | |
| Xu Jiayu | 50 m backstroke | 24.87 | 5 Q | 24.73 | 6 Q | 24.64 | 6 |
| Xu Jiayu | 100 m backstroke | 52.85 | 1 Q | 52.17 | 1 Q | 52.43 | 1st place, gold medalist(s) |
| Xu Jiayu | 200 m backstroke | 1:57.15 | 5 Q | Withdrawn | | | |
| Yan Zibei | 50 m breaststroke | 26.93 AS | 6 Q | 26.86 AS | 6 Q | 26.86 =AS | 6 |
| Yan Zibei | 100 m breaststroke | 59.13 | 4 Q | 58.67 AS | 2 Q | 58.63 AS | 3rd place, bronze medalist(s) |
| Yu Hexin | 50 m freestyle | 22.21; SO: 22.08 | =16 Q | 22.11 | 15 | Did not advance | |
| Yu Hexin | 50 m butterfly | 23.92 | 30 | Did not advance | | | |
| Zhang Ruixuan | 200 m breaststroke | 2:10.89 | 22 | Did not advance | | | |
| Yu Hexin; Yang Jintong; Cao Jiwen; He Junyi | 4 × 100 m freestyle relay | 3:16.23 | 17 | —N/a | | Did not advance | |
| Ji Xinjie; Wang Shun; Xu Jiayu; Sun Yang | 4 × 200 m freestyle relay | 7:07.05 | 5 Q | —N/a | | 7:04.74 | 6 |
| Xu Jiayu; Yan Zibei; Li Zhuhao; Cao Jiwen; He Junyi* | 4 × 100 m medley relay | 3:33.42 | 7 Q | —N/a | | 3:31.61 | 7 |

Women

| Athlete | Event | Heat | | Semifinal | | Final | |
| Athlete | Event | Time | Rank | Time | Rank | Time | Rank |
|---|---|---|---|---|---|---|---|
| Chen Jie | 50 m backstroke | 28.19 | 12 Q | 28.07 | 13 | Did not advance | |
| Chen Jie | 100 m backstroke | 1:00.64 | 15 Q | 1:01.68 | 16 | Did not advance | |
| Fu Yuanhui | 50 m backstroke | 27.70 | 1 Q | 27.84 | 9 | Did not advance | |
| Fu Yuanhui | 100 m backstroke | 1:01.19 | 22 | Did not advance | | | |
| Li Bingjie | 200 m freestyle | 1:57.59 | 8 Q | 1:57.30 | 11 | Did not advance | |
| Li Bingjie | 400 m freestyle | 4:07.88 | 9 | —N/a | | Did not advance | |
| Li Bingjie | 800 m freestyle | 8:37.41 | 15 | —N/a | | Did not advance | |
| Liu Xiang | 50 m freestyle | 24.61 | 8 Q | 24.46; SO: 24.53 | 9 | Did not advance | |
| Liu Yaxin | 200 m backstroke | 2:10.72 | 15 Q | 2:12.93 | 16 | Did not advance | |
| Peng Xuwei | 200 m backstroke | 2:12.41 | 22 | Did not advance | | | |
| Shi Jinglin | 100 m breaststroke | 1:09.88 | 31 | Did not advance | | | |
| Suo Ran | 50 m breaststroke | 31.20 | =13 Q | 31.46 | 14 | Did not advance | |
| Wang Jianjiahe | 400 m freestyle | 4:03.97 | 4 Q | —N/a | | 4:03.67 | 5 |
| Wang Jianjiahe | 800 m freestyle | 8:20.91 | 5 Q | —N/a | | 8:18.57 | 6 |
| Wang Jianjiahe | 1500 m freestyle | 16:00.17 | 7 Q | —N/a | | 15:51.00 | 3rd place, bronze medalist(s) |
| Wang Yichun | 50 m butterfly | 26.13 | 10 Q | 26.21 | 13 | Did not advance | |
| Wang Yichun | 100 m butterfly | 58.51 | 18 | Did not advance | | | |
| Wu Qingfeng | 50 m freestyle | 25.15 | 19 | Did not advance | | | |
| Yang Junxuan | 100 m freestyle | DNS | | Did not advance | | | |
| Yang Junxuan | 200 m freestyle | 1:56.43 | 4 Q | 1:55.99 WJ | 5 | 1:55.43 WJ | 5 |
| Ye Shiwen | 200 m breaststroke | 2:25.41 | 10 Q | 2:23.49 | 4 Q | 2:23.15 | 4 |
| Ye Shiwen | 200 m individual medley | 2:09.45 | 2 Q | 2:09.58 | 4 Q | 2:08.60 | 2nd place, silver medalist(s) |
| Ye Shiwen | 400 m individual medley | 4:37.66 | 3 Q | —N/a | | 4:32.07 | 2nd place, silver medalist(s) |
| Yu Jingyao | 100 m breaststroke | 1:06.91 | 6 Q | 1:06.85 | 7 Q | 1:06.56 | 5 |
| Yu Jingyao | 200 m breaststroke | 2:26.77 | 17 | Did not advance | | | |
| Yu Yiting | 200 m individual medley | 2:12.98 | 16 Q | 2:11.60 | 11 | Did not advance | |
| Yu Yiting | 400 m individual medley | 4:42.52 | 14 | —N/a | | Did not advance | |
| Zhang Ke | 1500 m freestyle | 16:50.55 | 23 | —N/a | | Did not advance | |
| Zhang Yufei | 50 m butterfly | 26.14 | =11 Q | 26.18 | 12 | Did not advance | |
| Zhang Yufei | 100 m butterfly | 58.02 | 12 Q | 57.93 | 13 | Did not advance | |
| Zhang Yufei | 200 m butterfly | 2:14.20 | 26 | Did not advance | | | |
| Zhu Jiaming | 200 m butterfly | 2:10.54 | 15 Q | 2:10.52 | 14 | Did not advance | |
| Zhu Menghui | 100 m freestyle | 54.25 | 16 Q | 54.07 | 14 | Did not advance | |
| Zhu Menghui; Wu Qingfeng; Wang Jingzhuo; Yang Junxuan | 4 × 100 m freestyle relay | 3:37.89 | 7 Q | —N/a | | 3:35.83 | 5 |
| Yang Junxuan; Wang Jianjiahe; Li Bingjie; Zhang Yuhan; Ai Yanhan*; Dong Jie* | 4 × 200 m freestyle relay | 7:54.10 | 4 Q | —N/a | | 7:46.22 | 4 |
| Chen Jie; Yu Jingyao; Zhang Yufei; Yang Junxuan; Fu Yuanhui*; Wang Yichun*; Zhu Menghui* | 4 × 100 m medley relay | 3:59.26 | 5 Q | —N/a | | 3:57.11 | 5 |

Mixed

| Athlete | Event | Heat | | Final | |
| Athlete | Event | Time | Rank | Time | Rank |
|---|---|---|---|---|---|
| Yu Hexin; Cao Jiwen; Wang Jingzhuo; Wu Qingfeng | 4 × 100 m mixed freestyle relay | 3:31.72 | 15 | Did not advance | |
| Li Guangyuan; Wang Lizhuo; Wang Yichun; Zhu Menghui | 4 × 100 m mixed medley relay | DSQ | | Did not advance | |

Legend: (*) = Swimmers who participated in the heat only.

== Water polo ==
=== Women's tournament ===
Team roster

- Peng Lin
- Wang Xinyan (C)
- Mei Xiaohan
- Xiong Dunhan
- Niu Guannan
- Guo Ning
- Wang Huan
- Zhang Cong
- Zhao Zihan
- Zhang Danyi
- Chen Xiao
- Zhang Jing
- Dong Wenxin
- Coach: Gong Dali

Group D

| Pos | Team | Pld | W | D | L | GF | GA | GD | Pts | Qualification |
|---|---|---|---|---|---|---|---|---|---|---|
| 1 | Italy | 3 | 3 | 0 | 0 | 33 | 22 | +11 | 6 | Quarterfinals |
| 2 | Australia | 3 | 2 | 0 | 1 | 32 | 29 | +3 | 4 | Playoffs |
| 3 | China | 3 | 1 | 0 | 2 | 26 | 34 | −8 | 2 | Playoffs |
| 4 | Japan | 3 | 0 | 0 | 3 | 20 | 26 | −6 | 0 | |

Source: Sportresult
Rules for classification: 1) points; 2) head-to-head points; 3) head-to-head goal difference; 4) head-to-head number of goals scored; 5) Goal difference.

| 14 July 2019; 19:10 | Report | Japan | 6–8 | China | Nambu University Aquatics Center, Gwangju; Referees: Gabriella Várkonyi (HUN), Michael Goldenberg (USA) |
| 14 July 2019; 19:10 | Report | Score by quarters: 2–1, 1–1, 2–4, 1–2 | | | Nambu University Aquatics Center, Gwangju; Referees: Gabriella Várkonyi (HUN), Michael Goldenberg (USA) |
| 14 July 2019; 19:10 | Report | Arima 3 | Goals | Chen, Wang X. 2 | Nambu University Aquatics Center, Gwangju; Referees: Gabriella Várkonyi (HUN), Michael Goldenberg (USA) |

| 16 July 2019; 16:30 | Report | Australia | 14–12 | China | Nambu University Aquatics Center, Gwangju; Referees: Viktor Salnichenko (KAZ), Michael Goldenberg (USA) |
| 16 July 2019; 16:30 | Report | Score by quarters: 4–4, 5–3, 3–3, 2–2 | | | Nambu University Aquatics Center, Gwangju; Referees: Viktor Salnichenko (KAZ), Michael Goldenberg (USA) |
| 16 July 2019; 16:30 | Report | Gofers, Webster 3 | Goals | Zhao 4 | Nambu University Aquatics Center, Gwangju; Referees: Viktor Salnichenko (KAZ), Michael Goldenberg (USA) |

| 18 July 2019; 12:30 | Report | Italy | 14–6 | China | Nambu University Aquatics Center, Gwangju; Referees: Marie-Claude Deslieres (CAN), Nenad Periš (CRO) |
| 18 July 2019; 12:30 | Report | Score by quarters: 5–1, 3–1, 4–2, 2–2 | | | Nambu University Aquatics Center, Gwangju; Referees: Marie-Claude Deslieres (CAN), Nenad Periš (CRO) |
| 18 July 2019; 12:30 | Report | Garibotti, Tabani 3 | Goals | Xiong 2 | Nambu University Aquatics Center, Gwangju; Referees: Marie-Claude Deslieres (CAN), Nenad Periš (CRO) |

Playoffs

| 20 July 2019; 17:00 | Report | Greece | 12–8 | China | Nambu University Aquatics Center, Gwangju; Referees: Nenad Periš (CRO), Dion Willis (RSA) |
| 20 July 2019; 17:00 | Report | Score by quarters: 4–1, 2–2, 4–4, 2–1 | | | Nambu University Aquatics Center, Gwangju; Referees: Nenad Periš (CRO), Dion Willis (RSA) |
| 20 July 2019; 17:00 | Report | Plevritou 3 | Goals | Zhao 4 | Nambu University Aquatics Center, Gwangju; Referees: Nenad Periš (CRO), Dion Willis (RSA) |

9th–12th place semifinals

| 22 July 2019; 11:00 | Report | Canada | 17–16 (PSO) | China | Nambu University Aquatics Center, Gwangju; Referees: Frank Ohme (GER), Daniel Flahive (AUS) |
| 22 July 2019; 11:00 | Report | Score by quarters: 4–4, 3–4, 1–1, 2–1 PSO: 7–6 | | | Nambu University Aquatics Center, Gwangju; Referees: Frank Ohme (GER), Daniel Flahive (AUS) |
| 22 July 2019; 11:00 | Report | Christmas 3 | Goals | Zhang 4 | Nambu University Aquatics Center, Gwangju; Referees: Frank Ohme (GER), Daniel Flahive (AUS) |

Eleventh place game

| 24 July 2019; 09:30 | Report | China | 14–12 | New Zealand | Nambu University Aquatics Center, Gwangju; Referees: Natacha Florestano (BRA), Jeremy Cheng (SGP) |
| 24 July 2019; 09:30 | Report | Score by quarters: 4–2, 3–2, 4–2, 3–6 | | | Nambu University Aquatics Center, Gwangju; Referees: Natacha Florestano (BRA), Jeremy Cheng (SGP) |
| 24 July 2019; 09:30 | Report | Zhang J 3 | Goals | McDowall, Houghton 4 | Nambu University Aquatics Center, Gwangju; Referees: Natacha Florestano (BRA), Jeremy Cheng (SGP) |
