= Swimming at the 2019 World Aquatics Championships =

- Host city: Gwangju, South Korea
- Date(s): 21–28 July
- Venue(s): Nambu University Municipal Aquatics Center
- Events: 42

Swimming at the 2019 World Aquatics Championships was held from 21 to 28 July 2019.

== Schedule ==
42 events were held.

All times are local (UTC+9).

H	Heats	½	Semi finals	F	Final

A = Afternoon session (starting at 10:00), E = Evening session (starting at 20:00)

Men
Date →	Sun 21		Mon 22		Tue 23		Wed 24		Thu 25		Fri 26		Sat 27		Sun 28	
Event ↓	A	E	A	E	A	E	A	E	A	E	A	E	A	E	A	E
50 m freestyle											H	½		F		
100 m freestyle							H	½		F						
200 m freestyle			H	½		F										
400 m freestyle	H	F														
800 m freestyle					H			F								
1500 m freestyle													H			F
50 m backstroke													H	½		F
100 m backstroke			H	½		F										
200 m backstroke									H	½		F				
50 m breaststroke					H	½		F								
100 m breaststroke	H	½		F												
200 m breaststroke									H	½		F				
50 m butterfly	H	½		F												
100 m butterfly											H	½		F		
200 m butterfly					H	½		F								
200 m individual medley							H	½		F						
400 m individual medley															H	F
4 × 100 m freestyle relay	H	F														
4 × 200 m freestyle relay											H	F				
4 × 100 m medley relay															H	F

Women
Date →	Sun 21		Mon 22		Tue 23		Wed 24		Thu 25		Fri 26		Sat 27		Sun 28	
Event ↓	A	E	A	E	A	E	A	E	A	E	A	E	A	E	A	E
50 m freestyle													H	½		F
100 m freestyle									H	½		F				
200 m freestyle					H	½		F								
400 m freestyle	H	F														
800 m freestyle											H			F		
1500 m freestyle			H			F										
50 m backstroke							H	½		F						
100 m backstroke			H	½		F										
200 m backstroke											H	½		F		
50 m breaststroke													H	½		F
100 m breaststroke			H	½		F										
200 m breaststroke									H	½		F				
50 m butterfly											H	½		F		
100 m butterfly	H	½		F												
200 m butterfly							H	½		F						
200 m individual medley	H	½		F												
400 m individual medley															H	F
4 × 100 m freestyle relay	H	F														
4 × 200 m freestyle relay									H	F						
4 × 100 m medley relay															H	F

Mixed
Date →	Sun 21		Mon 22		Tue 23		Wed 24		Thu 25		Fri 26		Sat 27		Sun 28	
Event ↓	A	E	A	E	A	E	A	E	A	E	A	E	A	E	A	E
4 × 100 m freestyle relay													H	F		
4 × 100 m medley relay							H	F								

== Medal summary ==
=== Medal table ===
Rank	Nation	Gold	Silver	Bronze	Total
1	United States	14	8	5	27
2	Australia	5	9	5	19
3	Hungary	4	0	0	4
4	Russia	3	7	6	16
5	Italy	3	2	3	8
6	China	3	2	2	7
7	Great Britain	3	1	3	7
8	Japan	2	2	2	6
9	Canada	2	0	6	8
10	Sweden	1	2	2	5
11	South Africa	1	1	2	4
12	Germany	1	1	0	2
13	Brazil	0	3	2	5
14	Greece	0	1	0	1
14	Netherlands	0	1	0	1
14	Norway	0	1	0	1
14	Switzerland	0	1	0	1
14	Ukraine	0	1	0	1
19	France	0	0	2	2
20	Egypt	0	0	1	1
20	New Zealand	0	0	1	1
Totals (21 entries)		42	43	42	127

=== Men ===
Event	Gold		Silver		Bronze	
50 m freestyle	Caeleb Dressel; United States	21.04; CR, NR	Bruno Fratus; Brazil Kristian Golomeev; Greece	21.45	None awarded	
100 m freestyle	Caeleb Dressel; United States	46.96; NR	Kyle Chalmers; Australia	47.08	Vladislav Grinev; Russia	47.82
200 m freestyle	Sun Yang; China	1:44.93	Katsuhiro Matsumoto; Japan	1:45.22; NR	Martin Malyutin; Russia Duncan Scott; Great Britain	1:45.63
400 m freestyle	Sun Yang; China	3:42.44	Mack Horton; Australia	3:43.17	Gabriele Detti; Italy	3:43.23; NR
800 m freestyle	Gregorio Paltrinieri; Italy	7:39.27; ER	Henrik Christiansen; Norway	7:41.28; NR	David Aubry; France	7:42.08; NR
1500 m freestyle	Florian Wellbrock; Germany	14:36.54	Mykhailo Romanchuk; Ukraine	14:37.63	Gregorio Paltrinieri; Italy	14:38.75
50 m backstroke	Zane Waddell; South Africa	24.43	Evgeny Rylov; Russia	24.49	Kliment Kolesnikov; Russia	24.51
100 m backstroke	Xu Jiayu; China	52.43	Evgeny Rylov; Russia	52.67	Mitch Larkin; Australia	52.77
200 m backstroke	Evgeny Rylov; Russia	1:53.40	Ryan Murphy; United States	1:54.12	Luke Greenbank; Great Britain	1:55.85
50 m breaststroke	Adam Peaty; Great Britain	26.06	Felipe Lima; Brazil	26.66	João Gomes Júnior; Brazil	26.69
100 m breaststroke	Adam Peaty; Great Britain	57.14	James Wilby; Great Britain	58.46	Yan Zibei; China	58.63; AS
200 m breaststroke	Anton Chupkov; Russia	2:06.12; WR	Matthew Wilson; Australia	2:06.68	Ippei Watanabe; Japan	2:06.73
50 m butterfly	Caeleb Dressel; United States	22.35; CR, AM	Oleg Kostin; Russia	22.70; NR	Nicholas Santos; Brazil	22.79
100 m butterfly	Caeleb Dressel; United States	49.66	Andrey Minakov; Russia	50.83; NR	Chad le Clos; South Africa	51.16
200 m butterfly	Kristóf Milák; Hungary	1:50.73; WR	Daiya Seto; Japan	1:53.86	Chad le Clos; South Africa	1:54.15
200 m individual medley	Daiya Seto; Japan	1:56.14	Jérémy Desplanches; Switzerland	1:56.56; NR	Chase Kalisz; United States	1:56.78
400 m individual medley	Daiya Seto; Japan	4:08.95	Jay Litherland; United States	4:09.22	Lewis Clareburt; New Zealand	4:12.07; NR
4 × 100 m freestyle relay	United States; Caeleb Dressel (47.63); Blake Pieroni (47.49); Zach Apple (46.86); Nathan Adrian (47.08); Townley Haas^{[a]} Michael Chadwick^{[a]}	3:09.06; CR	Russia; Vladislav Grinev (47.83); Vladimir Morozov (47.62); Kliment Kolesnikov (47.50); Evgeny Rylov (47.02); Andrey Minakov^{[a]}	3:09.97	Australia; Cameron McEvoy (48.44); Clyde Lewis (47.61); Alexander Graham (48.11); Kyle Chalmers (47.06)	3:11.22
4 × 200 m freestyle relay	Australia; Clyde Lewis (1:45.58); Kyle Chalmers (1:45.37); Alexander Graham (1:45.05); Mack Horton (1:44.85); Jack McLoughlin^{[a]} Thomas Fraser-Holmes^{[a]}	7:00.85; OC	Russia; Mikhail Dovgalyuk (1:45.56); Mikhail Vekovishchev (1:45.45); Aleksandr Krasnykh (1:45.38); Martin Malyutin (1:45.42); Ivan Girev^{[a]}	7:01.81	United States; Andrew Seliskar (1:45.81); Blake Pieroni (1:44.98); Zach Apple (1:46.03); Townley Haas (1:45.16); Jack Conger^{[a]} Jack LeVant^{[a]}	7:01.98
4 × 100 m medley relay	Great Britain; Luke Greenbank (53.95); Adam Peaty (57.20); James Guy (50.81); Duncan Scott (46.14); James Wilby^{[a]}	3:28.10; ER	United States; Ryan Murphy (52.92); Andrew Wilson (58.65); Caeleb Dressel (49.28); Nathan Adrian (47.60); Matt Grevers^{[a]} Michael Andrew^{[a]} Jack Conger^{[a]} Zach Apple^{[a]}	3:28.45	Russia; Evgeny Rylov (52.57); Kirill Prigoda (58.68); Andrey Minakov (50.54); Vladimir Morozov (47.02); Kliment Kolesnikov^{[a]} Anton Chupkov^{[a]} Mikhail Vekovishchev^{[a]} Vladislav Grinev^{[a]}	3:28.81; NR
AF African record | AM Americas record | AS Asian record | CR Championship record | ER European record | OC Oceania record | WR World record | NR National record

^{a} Swimmers who participated in the heats only and received medals.

=== Women ===
Event	Gold		Silver		Bronze	
50 m freestyle	Simone Manuel; United States	24.05	Sarah Sjöström; Sweden	24.07	Cate Campbell; Australia	24.11
100 m freestyle	Simone Manuel; United States	52.04; AM	Cate Campbell; Australia	52.43	Sarah Sjöström; Sweden	52.46
200 m freestyle	Federica Pellegrini; Italy	1:54.22	Ariarne Titmus; Australia	1:54.66	Sarah Sjöström; Sweden	1:54.78
400 m freestyle	Ariarne Titmus; Australia	3:58.76; OC	Katie Ledecky; United States	3:59.97	Leah Smith; United States	4:01.29
800 m freestyle	Katie Ledecky; United States	8:13.58	Simona Quadarella; Italy	8:14.99; NR	Ariarne Titmus; Australia	8:15.70; OC
1500 m freestyle	Simona Quadarella; Italy	15:40.89; NR	Sarah Köhler; Germany	15:48.83; NR	Wang Jianjiahe; China	15:51.00
50 m backstroke	Olivia Smoliga; United States	27.33; NR	Etiene Medeiros; Brazil	27.44	Daria Vaskina; Russia	27.51
100 m backstroke	Kylie Masse; Canada	58.60	Minna Atherton; Australia	58.85	Olivia Smoliga; United States	58.91
200 m backstroke	Regan Smith; United States	2:03.69	Kaylee McKeown; Australia	2:06.26	Kylie Masse; Canada	2:06.62
50 m breaststroke	Lilly King; United States	29.84	Benedetta Pilato; Italy	30.00	Yuliya Yefimova; Russia	30.15
100 m breaststroke	Lilly King; United States	1:04.93	Yuliya Yefimova; Russia	1:05.49	Martina Carraro; Italy	1:06.36; NR
200 m breaststroke	Yuliya Yefimova; Russia	2:20.17	Tatjana Schoenmaker; South Africa	2:22.52	Sydney Pickrem; Canada	2:22.90
50 m butterfly	Sarah Sjöström; Sweden	25.02	Ranomi Kromowidjojo; Netherlands	25.35	Farida Osman; Egypt	25.47
100 m butterfly	Maggie MacNeil; Canada	55.83; AM	Sarah Sjöström; Sweden	56.22	Emma McKeon; Australia	56.61
200 m butterfly	Boglárka Kapás; Hungary	2:06.78	Hali Flickinger; United States	2:06.95	Katie Drabot; United States	2:07.04
200 m individual medley	Katinka Hosszú; Hungary	2:07.53	Ye Shiwen; China	2:08.60	Sydney Pickrem; Canada	2:08.70
400 m individual medley	Katinka Hosszú; Hungary	4:30.39	Ye Shiwen; China	4:32.07	Yui Ohashi; Japan	4:32.33
4 × 100 m freestyle relay	Australia; Bronte Campbell (52.85); Brianna Throssell (53.34); Emma McKeon (52.57); Cate Campbell (51.45); Madison Wilson^{[b]}	3:30.21; CR	United States; Mallory Comerford (52.98); Abbey Weitzeil (52.66); Kelsi Dahlia (53.46); Simone Manuel (51.92); Allison Schmitt^{[b]} Margo Geer^{[b]} Lia Neal^{[b]}	3:31.02; AM	Canada; Kayla Sanchez (53.72); Taylor Ruck (52.19); Penny Oleksiak (52.69); Maggie MacNeil (53.18); Rebecca Smith^{[b]}	3:31.78; NR
4 × 200 m freestyle relay	Australia; Ariarne Titmus (1:54.27) OC; Madison Wilson (1:56.73); Brianna Throssell (1:55.60); Emma McKeon (1:54.90); Leah Neale^{[b]} Kiah Melverton^{[b]}	7:41.50; WR	United States; Simone Manuel (1:56.09); Katie Ledecky (1:54.61); Melanie Margalis (1:55.81); Katie McLaughlin (1:55.36); Allison Schmitt^{[b]} Gabby DeLoof^{[b]} Leah Smith^{[b]}	7:41.87; AM	Canada; Kayla Sanchez (1:57.32); Taylor Ruck (1:56.41); Emily Overholt (1:56.26); Penny Oleksiak (1:54.36); Rebecca Smith^{[b]} Emma O'Croinin^{[b]}	7:44.35; NR
4 × 100 m medley relay	United States; Regan Smith (57.57) WR; Lilly King (1:04.81); Kelsi Dahlia (56.16); Simone Manuel (51.86); Olivia Smoliga^{[b]} Melanie Margalis^{[b]} Katie McLaughlin^{[b]} Mallory Comerford^{[b]}	3:50.40; WR	Australia; Minna Atherton (59.06); Jessica Hansen (1:06.08); Emma McKeon (56.32); Cate Campbell (51.96); Kaylee McKeown^{[b]} Brianna Throssell^{[b]} Madison Wilson^{[b]}	3:53.42	Canada; Kylie Masse (59.12); Sydney Pickrem (1:06.42); Maggie MacNeil (55.56); Penny Oleksiak (52.48); Kierra Smith^{[b]} Rebecca Smith^{[b]} Taylor Ruck^{[b]}	3:53.58; NR
AF African record | AM Americas record | AS Asian record | CR Championship record | ER European record | OC Oceania record | WR World record | NR National record

^{b} Swimmers who participated in the heats only and received medals.

=== Mixed ===
Event	Gold		Silver		Bronze	
4 × 100 m freestyle relay	United States; Caeleb Dressel (47.34); Zach Apple (47.34); Mallory Comerford (52.72); Simone Manuel (52.00); Blake Pieroni^{[c]} Nathan Adrian^{[c]} Katie McLaughlin^{[c]} Abbey Weitzeil^{[c]}	3:19.40; WR	Australia; Kyle Chalmers (47.37); Clyde Lewis (48.18); Emma McKeon (52.06); Bronte Campbell (52.36); Cameron McEvoy^{[c]} Alexander Graham^{[c]} Brianna Throssell^{[c]} Madison Wilson^{[c]}	3:19.97; OC	France; Clément Mignon (48.44); Mehdy Metella (47.78); Charlotte Bonnet (52.87); Marie Wattel (53.02); Maxime Grousset^{[c]} Béryl Gastaldello^{[c]}	3:22.11
4 × 100 m medley relay	Australia; Mitch Larkin (53.47); Matthew Wilson (58.37); Emma McKeon (56.14); Cate Campbell (51.10); Minna Atherton^{[c]} Matthew Temple^{[c]} Bronte Campbell^{[c]}	3:39.08	United States; Ryan Murphy (52.46); Lilly King (1:04.94); Caeleb Dressel (49.33); Simone Manuel (52.37); Matt Grevers^{[c]} Andrew Wilson^{[c]} Kelsi Dahlia^{[c]} Mallory Comerford^{[c]}	3:39.10	Great Britain; Georgia Davies (59.25); Adam Peaty (57.73); James Guy (50.72); Freya Anderson (52.98); James Wilby^{[c]}	3:40.68
AF African record | AM Americas record | AS Asian record | CR Championship record | ER European record | OC Oceania record | WR World record | NR National record

^{c} Swimmers who participated in the heats only and received medals.

== Doping ==
Days before the competition, 20-year-old Australian swimmer Shayna Jack withdrew from the World Championships, mentioning “personal reasons”. On 27 July 2019, Jack published a statement on her social media profiles, confirming doping allegations over testing positive for a banned substance.

== Records ==
The following world and championship records were broken during the competition.

=== World records ===
Date	Event	Established for	Time	Name	Nation
July 21	Men's 100 m breaststroke semifinals	(same)	56.88	Adam Peaty	Great Britain
July 24	Men's 200 m butterfly final	(same)	1:50.73	Kristóf Milák	Hungary
July 25	Men's 200 m breaststroke semifinals	(same)	=2:06.67	Matthew Wilson	Australia
July 25	Women's 4 × 200 m freestyle relay final	(same)	7:41.50	Ariarne Titmus (1:54.27); Madison Wilson (1:56.73); Brianna Throssell (1:55.60); Emma McKeon (1:54.90)	Australia
July 26	Men's 100 m butterfly semifinals	(same)	49.50	Caeleb Dressel	United States
July 26	Women's 200 metre backstroke semifinals	(same)	2:03.35	Regan Smith	United States
July 26	Men's 200 m breaststroke final	(same)	2:06.12	Anton Chupkov	Russia
July 27	Mixed 4 × 100 m freestyle relay final	(same)	3:19.40	Caeleb Dressel (47.34); Zach Apple (47.34); Mallory Comerford (52.72); Simone Manuel (52.00)	United States
July 28	Women's 4 × 100 m medley relay final	Women's 100 m backstroke	57.57	Regan Smith	United States
July 28	Women's 4 × 100 m medley relay final	(same)	3:50.40	Regan Smith (57.57); Lilly King (1:04.81); Kelsi Dahlia (56.16); Simone Manuel (51.86)	United States

=== Championship records ===
Date	Event	Time	Name	Nation
July 21	Men's 50 m butterfly semifinals	22.57	Caeleb Dressel	United States
July 21	Men's 4 × 100 m freestyle relay final	3:09.06	Caeleb Dressel (47.63); Blake Pieroni (47.49); Zach Apple (46.86); Nathan Adrian (47.08)	United States
July 21	Women's 4 × 100 m freestyle relay final	3:30.21	Bronte Campbell (52.85); Brianna Throssell (53.34); Emma McKeon (52.57); Cate Campbell (51.45)	Australia
July 22	Men's 100 m backstroke semifinals	52.17	Xu Jiayu	China
July 22	Men's 50 m butterfly final	22.35	Caeleb Dressel	United States
July 25	Men's 200 m breaststroke semifinals	2:06.83	Anton Chupkov	Russia
July 27	Men's 50 m freestyle final	21.04	Caeleb Dressel	United States
