= Diving at the 2019 World Aquatics Championships – Mixed synchronized 10 metre platform =

Mixed synchronized 10 metre platform at the 2019 World Aquatics Championships
- Venue: Nambu University Municipal Aquatics Center
- Location: Gwangju, South Korea
- Dates: 13 July
- Competitors: 16 from 8 nations
- Teams: 8
- Winning points: 346.14

Medalists
gold medal	Lian Junjie; Si Yajie	China
silver medal	Viktor Minibaev; Ekaterina Beliaeva	Russia
bronze medal	José Balleza; María Sánchez	Mexico

The Mixed synchronized 10 metre platform competition at the 2019 World Aquatics Championships was held on 13 July 2019.

== Results ==
The final was started at 13:00.

Rank	Nation	Divers	Points
1st place, gold medalist(s)	China	Lian Junjie; Si Yajie	346.14
2nd place, silver medalist(s)	Russia	Viktor Minibaev; Ekaterina Beliaeva	311.28
3rd place, bronze medalist(s)	Mexico	José Balleza; María Sánchez	287.64
4	Great Britain	Noah Williams; Robyn Birch	285.18
5	United States	Zachary Cooper; Olivia Rosendahl	267.96
6	Italy	Maicol Verzotto; Noemi Batki	259.62
7	South Korea	Kim Ji-wook; Kwon Ha-lim	247.20
8	Brazil	Isaac Souza; Ingrid Oliveira	239.46
