= Diving at the 2019 World Aquatics Championships – Team event =

Team event at the 2019 World Aquatics Championships
- Venue: Nambu University Municipal Aquatics Center
- Location: Gwangju, South Korea
- Dates: 16 July
- Competitors: 32 from 16 nations
- Teams: 16
- Winning points: 416.65

Medalists
gold medal	Yang Jian; Lin Shan	China
silver medal	Sergey Nazin; Yulia Timoshinina	Russia
bronze medal	Andrew Capobianco; Katrina Young	United States

The Team event competition at the 2019 World Aquatics Championships was held on 16 July 2019.

== Results ==
The final was started at 20:45.

Rank	Nation	Divers	Points
1st place, gold medalist(s)	China	Yang Jian; Lin Shan	416.65
2nd place, silver medalist(s)	Russia	Sergey Nazin; Yulia Timoshinina	390.05
3rd place, bronze medalist(s)	United States	Andrew Capobianco; Katrina Young	357.60
4	Malaysia	Chew Yiwei; Leong Mun Yee	347.80
5	Australia	Cassiel Rousseau; Laura Hingston	329.30
6	Great Britain	Ross Haslam; Eden Cheng	327.90
7	Colombia	Sebastián Villa; Diana Pineda	325.40
8	Germany	Lars Rüdiger; Maria Kurjo	324.50
9	Ukraine	Oleksii Sereda; Anna Arnautova	323.20
10	Mexico	Ivan García; Paola Espinosa	319.55
11	Sweden	Vinko Paradzik; Ellen Ek	315.65
12	Cuba	Carlos Ramos; Anisley García	306.60
13	Italy	Riccardo Giovannini; Chiara Pellacani	301.05
14	Venezuela	Oscar Ariza; María Betancourt	294.00
15	Brazil	Isaac Souza; Tammy Takagi	287.10
16	Thailand	Thitipoom Marksin; Ramanya Yanmongkon	238.70
