= Diving at the 2019 World Aquatics Championships – Men's 10 metre platform =

Men's 10 metre platform at the 2019 World Aquatics Championships
- Venue: Nambu University Municipal Aquatics Center
- Location: Gwangju, South Korea
- Dates: 19–20 July
- Competitors: 47 from 28 nations
- Winning points: 598.65

Medalists
gold medal	Yang Jian	China
silver medal	Yang Hao	China
bronze medal	Aleksandr Bondar	Russia

The Men's 10 metre platform competition at the 2019 World Aquatics Championships was held on 19 and 20 July 2019.

== Results ==
The preliminary round was started on 19 July at 10:00. The semifinal was held on 19 July at 15:30. The final was held on 20 July at 20:45.

Green denotes finalists

Blue denotes semifinalists

Rank	Diver	Nationality	Preliminary		Semifinal		Final	
Rank	Diver	Nationality	Points	Rank	Points	Rank	Points	Rank
1st place, gold medalist(s)	Yang Jian	China	530.10	1	573.35	1	598.65	1
2nd place, silver medalist(s)	Yang Hao	China	503.20	3	572.30	2	585.75	2
3rd place, bronze medalist(s)	Aleksandr Bondar	Russia	483.55	5	426.60	10	541.05	3
4	Oleksiy Sereda	Ukraine	446.95	8	476.30	7	490.50	4
5	Benjamin Auffret	France	473.70	6	469.20	8	489.20	5
6	Woo Ha-ram	South Korea	485.15	4	493.90	4	477.25	6
7	Tom Daley	Great Britain	514.60	2	505.40	3	470.35	7
8	Brandon Loschiavo	United States	401.40	12	433.70	9	470.10	8
9	Cassiel Rousseau	Australia	393.95	17	416.80	12	455.35	9
10	Noah Williams	Great Britain	406.45	11	480.50	6	440.95	10
11	Vincent Riendeau	Canada	408.20	10	421.00	11	440.70	11
12	David Dinsmore	United States	436.95	9	483.60	5	438.15	12
13	Isaac Filho	Brazil	397.90	14	404.50	13	did not advance	
14	Igor Mialin	Russia	398.50	13	403.60	14	did not advance	
15	Rafael Quintero	Puerto Rico	397.65	15	382.30	15	did not advance	
16	Iván García	Mexico	469.55	7	368.80	16	did not advance	
17	Lou Massenberg	Germany	394.75	16	365.70	17	did not advance	
18	Kevin Berlín	Mexico	390.80	18	361.85	18	did not advance	
19	Sebastián Villa	Colombia	381.35	19	Did not advance			
20	Bryden Hattie	Canada	379.30	20	Did not advance			
21	Timo Barthel	Germany	366.50	21	Did not advance			
22	Vinko Paradzik	Sweden	365.90	22	Did not advance			
23	Nikolaos Molvalis	Greece	346.70	23	Did not advance			
24	Maicol Verzotto	Italy	346.20	24	Did not advance			
25	José Ruvalcaba	Dominican Republic	341.20	25	Did not advance			
26	Oleh Serbin	Ukraine	339.10	26	Did not advance			
27	Víctor Ortega	Colombia	339.05	27	Did not advance			
28	Oscar Ariza	Venezuela	334.50	28	Did not advance			
29	Youssef Ezzat	Egypt	328.65	29	Did not advance			
30	Jellson Jabillin	Malaysia	327.40	30	Did not advance			
31	Yoan Meriño	Cuba	326.85	31	Did not advance			
32	Jonathan Chan	Singapore	322.85	32	Did not advance			
33	Siddharth Pardeshi	India	319.60	33	Did not advance			
34	Riccardo Giovannini	Italy	319.30	34	Did not advance			
35	Vladimir Harutyunyan	Armenia	318.70	35	Did not advance			
36	Carlos Ramos	Cuba	312.60	36	Did not advance			
37	Kawan Pereira	Brazil	309.15	37	Did not advance			
38	Kim Yeong-taek	South Korea	298.40	38	Did not advance			
39	Lev Sargsyan	Armenia	296.10	39	Did not advance			
40	Nathan Brown	New Zealand	293.80	40	Did not advance			
41	Constantin Popovici	Romania	292.70	41	Did not advance			
42	Cătălin Cozma	Romania	287.95	42	Did not advance			
43	Athanasios Tsirikos	Greece	286.20	43	Did not advance			
44	Conrad Lewandowski	Thailand	283.55	44	Did not advance			
45	Mohab Ishak	Egypt	271.00	45	Did not advance			
46	Thitipoom Marksin	Thailand	269.00	46	Did not advance			
47	Frandiel Gómez	Dominican Republic	220.45	47	Did not advance			
