= Diving at the 2019 World Aquatics Championships – Women's synchronized 10 metre platform =

Women's synchronized 10 metre platform at the 2019 World Aquatics Championships
- Venue: Nambu University Municipal Aquatics Center
- Location: Gwangju, South Korea
- Dates: 14 July
- Competitors: 28 from 14 nations
- Teams: 14
- Winning points: 345.24

Medalists
gold medal	Lu Wei; Zhang Jiaqi	China
silver medal	Leong Mun Yee; Pandelela Rinong	Malaysia
bronze medal	Samantha Bromberg; Katrina Young	United States

The Women's synchronized 10 metre platform competition at the 2019 World Aquatics Championships was held on 14 July 2019.

== Results ==
The preliminary round was started at 10:00. The final was started at 20:45.

Green denotes finalists

Rank	Nation	Divers	Preliminary		Final	
Rank	Nation	Divers	Points	Rank	Points	Rank
1st place, gold medalist(s)	China	Lu Wei; Zhang Jiaqi	317.82	1	345.24	1
2nd place, silver medalist(s)	Malaysia	Leong Mun Yee; Pandelela Rinong	297.18	3	312.72	2
3rd place, bronze medalist(s)	United States	Samantha Bromberg; Katrina Young	295.38	4	304.86	3
4	Canada	Meaghan Benfeito; Caeli McKay	298.11	2	304.05	4
5	Russia	Ekaterina Beliaeva; Yulia Timoshinina	288.00	5	291.30	5
6	Great Britain	Eden Cheng; Lois Toulson	281.10	7	289.14	6
7	Italy	Noemi Batki; Chiara Pellacani	280.86	8	280.38	7
8	Australia	Emily Chinnock; Melissa Wu	274.20	9	277.44	8
9	Mexico	Gabriela Agúndez; Alejandra Orozco	281.28	6	274.68	9
10	South Korea	Cho Eun-bi; Moon Na-yun	256.86	12	261.12	10
11	Romania	Nicoleta Muscalu; Antonia Pavel	258.78	11	260.82	11
12	Germany	Christina Wassen; Tina Punzel	264.48	10	258.40	12
13	Norway	Anne Tuxen; Helle Tuxen	231.60	13	did not advance	
14	Macau	Leong Sut In; Leong Sut Chan	192.39	14	did not advance	
