= Swimming at the 2019 World Aquatics Championships – Women's 400 metre individual medley =

Women's 400 metre individual medley at the 2019 World Aquatics Championships
- Venue: Nambu University Municipal Aquatics Center
- Location: Gwangju, South Korea
- Dates: 28 July (heats and final)
- Competitors: 26 from 21 nations
- Winning time: 4:30.39

Medalists
gold medal	Katinka Hosszú	Hungary
silver medal	Ye Shiwen	China
bronze medal	Yui Ohashi	Japan

The Women's 400 metre individual medley competition at the 2019 World Championships was held on 28 July 2019.

== Records ==
Prior to the competition, the existing world and championship records were as follows.

World record	Katinka Hosszú (HUN)	4:26.36	Rio de Janeiro, Brazil	6 August 2016
Competition record	Katinka Hosszú (HUN)	4:29.33	Budapest, Hungary	30 July 2017

== Results ==
=== Heats ===
The heats were held on 28 July at 10:30.

Rank	Heat	Lane	Name	Nationality	Time	Notes
1	3	4	Katinka Hosszú	Hungary	4:35.40	Q
2	2	4	Yui Ohashi	Japan	4:37.23	Q
3	3	7	Ye Shiwen	China	4:37.66	Q
4	3	1	Emily Overholt	Canada	4:37.90	Q
5	3	3	Ally McHugh	United States	4:38.32	Q
6	3	5	Fantine Lesaffre	France	4:38.40	Q
7	2	6	Sydney Pickrem	Canada	4:38.59	Q
8	2	1	Zsuzsanna Jakabos	Hungary	4:38.93	Q
9	3	6	Brooke Forde	United States	4:39.74	
10	2	2	Kim Seo-yeong	South Korea	4:40.55	
11	2	3	Aimee Willmott	Great Britain	4:41.24	
12	2	7	Anja Crevar	Serbia	4:41.59	
13	3	2	Mireia Belmonte	Spain	4:42.16	
14	2	0	Yu Yiting	China	4:42.52	
15	3	0	Victoria Kaminskaya	Portugal	4:43.03	
16	2	5	Ilaria Cusinato	Italy	4:43.27	
17	2	8	Viktoriya Zeynep Güneş	Turkey	4:46.01	
18	3	9	Jimena Pérez	Spain	4:47.51	
19	3	8	Nguyễn Thị Ánh Viên	Vietnam	4:47.96	
20	1	2	Katja Fain	Slovenia	4:48.24	
21	2	9	Barbora Závadová	Czech Republic	4:48.93	
22	1	5	Rebecca Meder	South Africa	4:53.99	
23	1	6	Azzahra Permatahani	Indonesia	4:58.19	
24	1	7	María Fe Muñoz	Peru	4:58.62	
25	1	4	Aleksandra Knop	Poland	5:00.77	
26	1	3	Claudia Gadea	Romania	5:01.11	

=== Final ===
The final was held on 28 July at 21:19.

Rank	Lane	Name	Nationality	Time	Notes
1st place, gold medalist(s)	4	Katinka Hosszú	Hungary	4:30.39	
2nd place, silver medalist(s)	3	Ye Shiwen	China	4:32.07	
3rd place, bronze medalist(s)	5	Yui Ohashi	Japan	4:32.33	
4	1	Sydney Pickrem	Canada	4:36.72	
5	6	Emily Overholt	Canada	4:37.42	
6	2	Ally McHugh	United States	4:38.34	
7	8	Zsuzsanna Jakabos	Hungary	4:39.15	
8	7	Fantine Lesaffre	France	4:39.68	
