= Malaysia at the 2019 World Aquatics Championships =

- Flag of Malaysia
- FINA code: MAS
- National federation: Amateur Swimming Union of Malaysia
- Website: malaysiaswimming.org

in Gwangju, South Korea
- Medals Ranked 18th: Gold 0 Silver 1 Bronze 0 Total 1

World Aquatics Championships appearances
- 1973; 1975; 1978; 1982; 1986; 1991; 1994; 1998; 2001; 2003; 2005; 2007; 2009; 2011; 2013; 2015; 2017; 2019; 2022; 2023; 2024

Malaysia competed at the 2019 World Aquatics Championships in Gwangju, South Korea from 12 to 28 July.

== Medalists ==
Medal	Name	Sport	Event	Date
Silver	Leong Mun Yee; Pandelela Rinong	Diving	Women's 10 m synchronized platform	July 14

== Diving ==
Malaysia entered nine divers.

Men

Athlete	Event	Preliminaries		Semifinals		Final	
Athlete	Event	Points	Rank	Points	Rank	Points	Rank
Muhammad Syafiq Puteh	1 m springboard	283.20	33	—		Did not advance	
Ooi Tze Liang	3 m springboard	376.95	25	Did not advance			
Chew Yiwei	3 m springboard	332.65	41	Did not advance			
Jellson Jabillin	10 m platform	327.40	30	Did not advance			
Chew Yiwei; Ooi Tze Liang	Synchronized 3 m springboard	348.00	11 Q	—		357.30	12
Jellson Jabillin; Hanis Nazirul Jaya Surya	Synchronized 10 m platform	333.90	13	—		Did not advance	

Women

Athlete	Event	Preliminaries		Semifinals		Final	
Athlete	Event	Points	Rank	Points	Rank	Points	Rank
Nur Dhabitah Sabri	3 m springboard	249.05	25	Did not advance			
Ng Yan Yee	3 m springboard	279.30	12 Q	288.60	10 Q	282.40	9
Pandelela Rinong	10 m platform	303.70	12 Q	312.70	9 Q	349.25	5
Ng Yan Yee; Nur Dhabitah Sabri	Synchronized 3 m springboard	270.60	6 Q	—		277.35	8
Leong Mun Yee; Pandelela Rinong	Synchronized 10 m platform	297.18	3 Q	—		312.72	2nd place, silver medalist(s)

Mixed

Athlete	Event	Final	
Athlete	Event	Points	Rank
Muhammad Syafiq Puteh; Nur Dhabitah Sabri	Synchronized 3 m springboard	271.29	11
Chew Yiwei; Leong Mun Yee	Team event	347.80	4

== Swimming ==
Malaysia entered five swimmers.

Men

Athlete	Event	Heat		Semifinal		Final	
Athlete	Event	Time	Rank	Time	Rank	Time	Rank
Chan Jie	50 m butterfly	25.08	=54	Did not advance			
Chan Jie	100 m butterfly	53.85	38	Did not advance			
Welson Sim	100 m freestyle	50.77	59	Did not advance			
Welson Sim	200 m freestyle	1:48.61	29	Did not advance			
Welson Sim	400 m freestyle	3:52.85	24	—		Did not advance	
Tern Jian Han	50 m backstroke	26.12	=42	Did not advance			
Tern Jian Han	100 m backstroke	57.34	48	Did not advance			
Tia'a Faang Der	200 m butterfly	2:03.51	42	Did not advance			
Tia'a Faang Der	400 m individual medley	4:33.88	37	—		Did not advance	
Welson Sim; Chan Jie; Tern Jian Han; Tia'a Faang Der	4 × 100 m freestyle relay	3:29.95	25	—		Did not advance	
	4 × 100 m medley relay	DNS		—		Did not advance	

Women

Athlete	Event	Heat		Semifinal		Final	
Athlete	Event	Time	Rank	Time	Rank	Time	Rank
Phee Jinq En	50 m breaststroke	32.23	31	Did not advance			
Phee Jinq En	100 m breaststroke	1:09.05	=27	Did not advance			

Mixed

Athlete	Event	Heat		Final	
Athlete	Event	Time	Rank	Time	Rank
	4 × 100 m medley relay	DNS		Did not advance	
