= Swimming at the 2019 World Aquatics Championships – Men's 100 metre freestyle =

Men's 100 metre freestyle at the 2019 World Aquatics Championships
- Venue: Nambu University Municipal Aquatics Center
- Location: Gwangju, South Korea
- Dates: 24 July (heats and semifinals); 25 July (final)
- Competitors: 120 from 112 nations
- Winning time: 46.96

Medalists
gold medal	Caeleb Dressel	United States
silver medal	Kyle Chalmers	Australia
bronze medal	Vladislav Grinev	Russia

The Men's 100 metre freestyle competition at the 2019 World Championships was held on 24 and 25 July 2019.

== Records ==
Prior to the competition, the existing world and championship records were as follows.

World record	César Cielo (BRA)	46.91	Rome, Italy	30 July 2009
Competition record	César Cielo (BRA)	46.91	Rome, Italy	30 July 2009

== Results ==
=== Heats ===
The heats were held on 24 July at 10:15.

Rank	Heat	Lane	Name	Nationality	Time	Notes
1	11	5	Caeleb Dressel	United States	47.32	Q
2	12	4	Vladislav Grinev	Russia	47.92	Q
3	11	4	Marcelo Chierighini	Brazil	47.95	Q
4	12	7	Clément Mignon	France	48.20	Q
5	12	3	Blake Pieroni	United States	48.31	Q
6	11	6	Nándor Németh	Hungary	48.36	Q
7	13	6	Breno Correia	Brazil	48.39	Q
8	13	3	Alessandro Miressi	Italy	48.57	Q
9	13	7	Clyde Lewis	Australia	48.63	Q
10	13	4	Kyle Chalmers	Australia	48.66	Q
11	13	2	Katsumi Nakamura	Japan	48.68	Q
11	11	1	Shinri Shioura	Japan	48.68	Q
13	12	2	Mehdy Metella	France	48.71	Q
14	11	3	He Junyi	China	48.76	Q
14	11	2	Pieter Timmers	Belgium	48.76	Q
16	13	8	Dylan Carter	Trinidad and Tobago	48.77	Q
17	12	0	Yuri Kisil	Canada	48.79	
18	12	1	Santo Condorelli	Italy	48.80	
19	11	0	Kacper Majchrzak	Poland	48.87	
19	11	8	Serhiy Shevtsov	Ukraine	48.87	
21	11	9	Simonas Bilis	Lithuania	48.90	
22	13	0	Markus Thormeyer	Canada	49.05	
23	11	7	Oussama Sahnoune	Algeria	49.08	
24	13	5	Vladimir Morozov	Russia	49.09	
25	13	1	Kyle Stolk	Netherlands	49.20	
26	10	8	Ali Khalafalla	Egypt	49.22	
27	13	9	Bruno Blašković	Croatia	49.24	
28	12	8	Marius Kusch	Germany	49.31	
29	10	2	Yang Jae-hoon	South Korea	49.37	
30	10	0	Cristian Quintero	Venezuela	49.40	
31	2	7	Nils Liess	Switzerland	49.42	
32	12	9	Velimir Stjepanović	Serbia	49.44	
32	8	8	Daniel Zaitsev	Estonia	49.44	NR
34	10	4	Khader Baqlah	Jordan	49.46	
35	10	1	Emir Muratović	Bosnia and Herzegovina	49.59	
35	10	3	Mikel Schreuders	Aruba	49.59	
37	10	5	Daniel Hunter	New Zealand	49.78	
38	9	3	Meiron Cheruti	Israel	49.82	
39	10	6	Renzo Tjon A Joe	Suriname	49.85	
40	9	6	Darren Chua	Singapore	49.89	
41	9	5	Artsiom Machekin	Belarus	49.90	
42	8	7	Luke Gebbie	Philippines	49.94	NR
43	9	2	Ben Hockin	Paraguay	49.95	
44	8	5	Ari-Pekka Liukkonen	Finland	49.98	
44	9	4	Miguel Nascimento	Portugal	49.98	
46	7	8	Alexei Sancov	Moldova	50.05	
47	9	2	Hüseyin Emre Sakçı	Turkey	50.24	
48	7	2	Artur Barseghyan	Armenia	50.26	
49	9	9	Vladimír Štefánik	Slovakia	50.27	
50	10	7	Adil Kaskabay	Kazakhstan	50.34	
51	8	3	Ian Ho Yentou	Hong Kong	50.38	
52	8	1	Julien Henx	Luxembourg	50.43	
53	8	0	Xander Skinner	Namibia	50.44	NR
53	9	1	Niksa Stojkovski	Norway	50.44	
55	8	6	Ioannis Georgarakis	Greece	50.48	
56	7	3	Peter Wetzlar	Zimbabwe	50.50	NR
57	3	8	Waleed Abdulrazzak	Kuwait	50.63	NR
58	7	5	Isaac Beitia	Panama	50.66	NR
59	10	9	Welson Sim	Malaysia	50.77	
60	8	9	Horus Briseño	Mexico	50.80	
61	8	2	Curtis Coulter	Ireland	50.86	
62	7	7	Enzo Martínez	Uruguay	50.99	
63	6	7	Mokhtar Al-Yamani	Yemen	51.16	NR
64	7	6	Gabriel Araya	Chile	51.34	
65	7	4	Andrew Digby	Thailand	51.47	
66	6	4	Benyamin Gharehhassanloo	Iran	51.49	
67	9	7	Lin Chien-liang	Chinese Taipei	51.65	
67	7	9	Jean-Luc Zephir	Saint Lucia	51.65	
69	6	3	Jesse Washington	Bermuda	51.67	
70	8	4	Triady Fauzi Sidiq	Indonesia	51.80	
71	7	0	Jared Fitzgerald	Bahamas	51.88	
72	6	5	Teimuraz Kobakhidze	Georgia	51.93	
73	6	9	Noah Mascoll-Gomes	Antigua and Barbuda	52.12	
73	5	0	Netani Ross	Fiji	52.12	
75	6	6	Miguel Mena	Nicaragua	52.20	
76	6	8	Abdoul Niane	Senegal	52.26	
77	5	1	Audai Hassouna	Libya	52.34	
78	5	2	Jordan Crooks	Cayman Islands	52.36	
79	7	1	Omiros Zagkas	Cyprus	52.44	
80	5	3	Kledi Kadiu	Albania	52.53	
80	6	2	Jagger Stephens	Guam	52.53	
82	6	1	Sam Seghers	Papua New Guinea	52.64	
83	6	0	Danilo Rosafio	Kenya	52.66	
84	2	0	Nixon Hernández	El Salvador	52.74	
85	5	6	Delron Felix	Grenada	53.08	
86	5	8	Syed Tariq	Pakistan	53.34	NR
87	5	4	Matt Galea	Malta	53.63	
88	5	5	Issa Al-Adawi	Oman	53.81	
89	4	4	Atuhaire Ambala	Uganda	53.89	NR
90	4	5	Noel Keane	Palau	54.10	
91	1	4	Musa Zhalayev	Turkmenistan	54.14	
92	3	1	Myagmaryn Delgerkhüü	Mongolia	54.43	
93	4	3	Andrew Fowler	Guyana	54.72	
94	1	3	Alex Joachim	Saint Vincent and the Grenadines	54.96	
95	5	9	Theo Chiabaut	Monaco	54.99	
96	2	3	Heriniavo Rasolonjatovo	Madagascar	55.22	
97	2	6	Yellow Yeiyah	Nigeria	55.23	
98	3	7	Christian Nikles	Brunei	55.33	
99	5	7	Firas Saidi	Qatar	55.60	
100	2	9	Daniel Christian	Eritrea	55.88	
101	4	6	Kaleo Kihleng	Federated States of Micronesia	55.97	
102	3	9	Alexander Shah	Nepal	56.28	
103	4	2	Dren Ukimeraj	Kosovo	56.33	
104	4	7	Billy-Scott Irakose	Burundi	56.45	
105	2	2	Hem Puch	Cambodia	56.77	
106	4	1	Finau Ohuafi	Tonga	57.45	
107	3	0	Lennosuke Suzuki	Northern Mariana Islands	57.83	
108	4	0	Mubal Ibrahim	Maldives	58.24	NR
109	3	3	Adama Ouedraogo	Burkina Faso	58.27	
110	4	8	Alijon Khairulloev	Tajikistan	58.36	
111	2	8	Mark Hoare	Eswatini	59.27	
112	3	2	Albachir Mouctar	Niger	1:00.15	
113	3	4	Edgar Iro	Solomon Islands	1:00.98	
114	1	5	Guerby Ruuska	Haiti	1:01.04	
115	3	6	Michael Swift	Malawi	1:02.55	
116	4	9	Houssein Gaber	Djibouti	1:03.54	
117	2	4	Hakim Youssouf	Comoros	1:05.48	
118	2	1	Mamadou Bah	Guinea	1:05.54	
119	2	5	Domingos da Silva	Timor-Leste	1:06.71	
120	3	5	Tenzin Sangay	Bhutan	1:07.28	
	9	8	Khurshidjon Tursunov	Uzbekistan	DNS	
	12	5	Duncan Scott	Great Britain	DNS	
	12	6	Chad le Clos	South Africa	DNS	

=== Semifinals ===
The semifinals were held on 24 July at 20:26.

==== Semifinal 1 ====
Rank	Lane	Name	Nationality	Time	Notes
1	2	Kyle Chalmers	Australia	47.58	Q
2	4	Vladislav Grinev	Russia	47.82	Q
3	5	Clément Mignon	France	48.25	Q
4	3	Nándor Németh	Hungary	48.29	Q
5	6	Alessandro Miressi	Italy	48.36	
6	7	Katsumi Nakamura	Japan	48.45	
7	8	Dylan Carter	Trinidad and Tobago	48.52	NR
8	1	Pieter Timmers	Belgium	48.91	

==== Semifinal 2 ====
Rank	Lane	Name	Nationality	Time	Notes
1	4	Caeleb Dressel	United States	47.35	Q
2	5	Marcelo Chierighini	Brazil	47.76	Q
3	3	Blake Pieroni	United States	47.87	Q
4	6	Breno Correia	Brazil	48.33	Q
5	2	Clyde Lewis	Australia	48.45	
6	7	Shinri Shioura	Japan	48.54	
7	1	Mehdy Metella	France	48.65	
8	8	He Junyi	China	48.67	

=== Final ===
The final was held on 25 July at 20:22.

Rank	Lane	Name	Nationality	Time	Notes
1st place, gold medalist(s)	4	Caeleb Dressel	United States	46.96	NR
2nd place, silver medalist(s)	5	Kyle Chalmers	Australia	47.08	
3rd place, bronze medalist(s)	6	Vladislav Grinev	Russia	47.82	
4	2	Blake Pieroni	United States	47.88	
5	3	Marcelo Chierighini	Brazil	47.93	
6	1	Nándor Németh	Hungary	48.10	NR
7	7	Clément Mignon	France	48.43	
8	8	Breno Correia	Brazil	48.90	
