= Swimming at the 2019 World Aquatics Championships – Women's 50 metre freestyle =

Women's 50 metre freestyle at the 2019 World Aquatics Championships
- Venue: Nambu University Municipal Aquatics Center
- Location: Gwangju, South Korea
- Dates: 27 July (heats and semifinals); 28 July (final)
- Competitors: 101 from 94 nations
- Winning time: 24.05

Medalists
gold medal	Simone Manuel	United States
silver medal	Sarah Sjöström	Sweden
bronze medal	Cate Campbell	Australia

The Women's 50 metre freestyle competition at the 2019 World Championships was held on 27 and 28 July 2019.

== Records ==
Prior to the competition, the existing world and championship records were as follows.

World record	Sarah Sjöström (SWE)	23.67	Budapest, Hungary	29 July 2017
Competition record	Sarah Sjöström (SWE)	23.67	Budapest, Hungary	29 July 2017

== Results ==
=== Heats ===
The heats were held on 27 July at 10:00.

Rank	Heat	Lane	Name	Nationality	Time	Notes
1	11	4	Sarah Sjöström	Sweden	24.26	Q
2	9	4	Cate Campbell	Australia	24.40	Q
3	11	5	Simone Manuel	United States	24.41	Q
4	10	4	Pernille Blume	Denmark	24.44	Q
4	11	3	Maria Kameneva	Russia	24.44	Q
6	11	6	Abbey Weitzeil	United States	24.47	Q
7	9	5	Ranomi Kromowidjojo	Netherlands	24.56	Q
8	9	6	Liu Xiang	China	24.61	Q
9	10	5	Bronte Campbell	Australia	24.74	Q
10	9	3	Femke Heemskerk	Netherlands	24.80	Q
11	11	1	Anna Hopkin	Great Britain	24.85	Q
12	9	2	Michelle Coleman	Sweden	24.95	Q
13	11	7	Lidón Muñoz del Campo	Spain	24.96	Q
14	11	2	Katarzyna Wilk	Poland	24.97	Q
15	9	8	Julie Kepp Jensen	Denmark	25.02	Q
16	10	9	Julie Meynen	Luxembourg	25.07	Q
17	10	1	Federica Pellegrini	Italy	25.08	
18	8	3	Neža Klančar	Slovenia	25.12	NR
19	10	2	Wu Qingfeng	China	25.15	
20	11	0	Rika Omoto	Japan	25.17	
21	10	7	Arina Surkova	Russia	25.19	
21	11	8	Theodora Drakou	Greece	25.19	
23	10	3	Etiene Medeiros	Brazil	25.26	
24	8	4	Anika Apostalon	Czech Republic	25.30	
25	8	5	Jeong So-eun	South Korea	25.40	
25	9	9	Andrea Murez	Israel	25.40	
27	10	0	Erin Gallagher	South Africa	25.48	
28	11	9	Quah Ting Wen	Singapore	25.50	
29	9	7	Mimosa Jallow	Finland	25.66	
30	9	0	Nina Kost	Switzerland	25.74	
31	8	1	Selen Özbilen	Turkey	25.83	
32	8	8	Kalia Antoniou	Cyprus	25.86	
33	7	5	Cherelle Thompson	Trinidad and Tobago	25.89	=NR
34	8	9	Remedy Rule	Philippines	25.92	
35	8	6	Gabriela Ņikitina	Latvia	25.96	
36	8	2	Karen Torrez	Bolivia	26.01	
37	8	0	Chelsey Edwards	New Zealand	26.05	
38	8	7	Allyson Ponson	Aruba	26.06	
39	2	9	Talita Baqlah	Jordan	26.13	NR
40	7	7	On Kei Lei	Macau	26.34	
41	6	8	Felicity Passon	Seychelles	26.35	
42	7	9	Natalya Kritinina	Uzbekistan	26.47	NR
43	7	4	Maddy Moore	Bermuda	26.48	
44	7	0	Lushavel Stickland	Samoa	26.77	
45	7	1	Emily Muteti	Kenya	26.81	
45	7	6	Mariel Mencia	Dominican Republic	26.81	
47	3	1	Catharine Cooper	Panama	26.88	
48	6	5	Matelita Buadromo	Fiji	27.00	
49	7	3	Chade Nersicio	Curaçao	27.13	
50	3	5	Mónica Ramírez	Andorra	27.17	
51	7	2	Lauren Hew	Cayman Islands	27.26	
52	6	4	Samantha Roberts	Antigua and Barbuda	27.27	
53	6	7	Jeanne Boutbien	Senegal	27.33	
54	6	3	Nikol Merizaj	Albania	27.40	
55	6	6	Inés Remersaro	Uruguay	27.41	
56	2	3	Varsenik Manucharyan	Armenia	27.54	
57	2	0	Kimiko Raheem	Sri Lanka	27.56	
58	5	6	Batbayaryn Enkhkhüslen	Mongolia	27.66	NR
59	6	0	Marie Khoury	Lebanon	27.85	
59	6	2	Naima Hazell	Saint Lucia	27.85	
61	6	1	Mariam Imnadze	Georgia	27.95	
62	5	4	Bisma Khan	Pakistan	28.05	
63	6	9	Lina Khiyara	Morocco	28.17	
64	3	0	Judith Meauri	Papua New Guinea	28.30	
65	5	2	Daila Ismatul	Guatemala	28.31	
66	5	5	Fjorda Shabani	Kosovo	28.34	
67	5	9	Noelani Day	Tonga	28.67	
68	5	7	Jamila Sanmoogan	Guyana	28.72	
69	2	2	Dirngulbai Misech	Palau	28.88	
70	5	0	Anastasiia Filina	Kyrgyzstan	28.99	
71	3	9	Sofia Shah	Nepal	29.05	
72	1	2	Naomy Grand'Pierre	Haiti	29.07	
73	5	8	Camille Koenig	Mauritius	29.14	
74	2	5	Latroya Pina	Cape Verde	29.34	
75	5	3	Avice Meya	Uganda	29.49	
76	3	8	Alaa Binrajab	Bahrain	29.55	
77	1	6	Angelika Ouedraogo	Burkina Faso	29.60	
78	5	1	Ann-Marie Hepler	Marshall Islands	29.63	
79	3	6	Taffi Illis	Sint Maarten	29.76	
80	4	4	Margie Winter	Federated States of Micronesia	29.80	
81	4	3	Ammara Pinto	Malawi	29.98	
81	4	5	Anastasiya Tyurina	Tajikistan	29.98	
83	1	7	Hemthon Vitiny	Cambodia	30.01	
84	4	6	Dania Nour	Palestine	30.46	
85	4	1	Nafissath Radji	Benin	30.85	
86	3	3	Junayna Ahmed	Bangladesh	30.96	
87	4	2	Domingas Munhemeze	Mozambique	30.98	
88	4	7	Siri Arun Budcharern	Laos	31.32	
89	4	8	Sylvia Caloiaro	Tanzania	31.51	
90	3	2	Nada Arkaji	Qatar	31.57	
91	4	9	Chloe Sauvourel	Central African Republic	32.16	
92	2	4	Rahel Gebresilassie	Ethiopia	32.36	
93	3	7	Aya Mpali	Gabon	32.68	
94	3	4	Roukaya Mahamane	Niger	33.71	
95	4	0	Imelda Ximenes	Timor-Leste	34.64	
96	2	8	Haneen Ibrahim	Sudan	34.81	
97	2	6	Tity Dumbuya	Sierra Leone	34.85	
98	1	5	Odrina Kaze	Burundi	34.97	
99	2	7	Safia Houssein	Djibouti	37.16	
100	1	4	Ida Cham	Gambia	45.44	
	2	1	Juanita Ndong	Equatorial Guinea	DSQ	
	1	3	Grace Kadje	Togo	DNS	
	7	8	Naomi Ruele	Botswana	DNS	
	9	1	Kayla Sanchez	Canada	DNS	
	10	6	Charlotte Bonnet	France	DNS	
	10	8	Farida Osman	Egypt	DNS	

=== Semifinals ===
The semifinals were started on 27 July at 20:17.

==== Semifinal 1 ====
Rank	Lane	Name	Nationality	Time	Notes
1	4	Cate Campbell	Australia	24.09	Q
2	5	Pernille Blume	Denmark	24.14	Q
3	6	Liu Xiang	China	24.46	QSO
4	3	Abbey Weitzeil	United States	24.58	
5	2	Femke Heemskerk	Netherlands	24.77	
6	8	Julie Meynen	Luxembourg	24.78	NR
7	7	Michelle Coleman	Sweden	24.94	
8	1	Katarzyna Wilk	Poland	25.03	

==== Semifinal 2 ====
Rank	Lane	Name	Nationality	Time	Notes
1	4	Sarah Sjöström	Sweden	24.05	Q
2	5	Simone Manuel	United States	24.21	Q
3	3	Maria Kameneva	Russia	24.33	Q
4	7	Anna Hopkin	Great Britain	24.34	Q
5	6	Ranomi Kromowidjojo	Netherlands	24.38	Q
6	2	Bronte Campbell	Australia	24.46	QSO
7	8	Julie Kepp Jensen	Denmark	24.89	
8	1	Lidón Muñoz del Campo	Spain	25.02	

==== Swim-off ====
The swim-off was started on 27 July at 22:33.

Rank	Lane	Name	Nationality	Time	Notes
1	5	Bronte Campbell	Australia	24.38	Q
2	4	Liu Xiang	China	24.53	

=== Final ===
The final was held on 28 July at 20:47.

Rank	Lane	Name	Nationality	Time	Notes
1st place, gold medalist(s)	6	Simone Manuel	United States	24.05	
2nd place, silver medalist(s)	4	Sarah Sjöström	Sweden	24.07	
3rd place, bronze medalist(s)	5	Cate Campbell	Australia	24.11	
4	3	Pernille Blume	Denmark	24.12	
5	2	Maria Kameneva	Russia	24.31	
6	1	Ranomi Kromowidjojo	Netherlands	24.35	
7	7	Anna Hopkin	Great Britain	24.40	
8	8	Bronte Campbell	Australia	24.48	
