= Mexico at the 2019 World Aquatics Championships =

- Flag of Mexico
- World Aquatics code: MEX
- National federation: Mexican Swimming Federation
- Website: fmn.org.mx (in Spanish)

in Gwangju, South Korea
- Competitors: 40 in 5 sports
- Medals Ranked 17th: Gold 0 Silver 2 Bronze 4 Total 6

World Aquatics Championships appearances
- 1973; 1975; 1978; 1982; 1986; 1991; 1994; 1998; 2001; 2003; 2005; 2007; 2009; 2011; 2013; 2015; 2017; 2019; 2022; 2023; 2024; 2025

Mexico competed at the 2019 World Aquatics Championships in Gwangju, South Korea from 12 to 28 July.

== Medalists ==
Medal	Name	Sport	Event	Date
Silver	Rommel Pacheco	Diving	Men's 1 m springboard	14 July
Silver	Adriana Jiménez	High diving	Women's high diving	23 July
Bronze	José Balleza; María Sánchez	Diving	Mixed 10 m synchronized platform	13 July
Bronze	Yahel Castillo; Juan Celaya	Diving	Men's 3 m synchronized springboard	13 July
Bronze	Paola Espinosa; Melany Hernández	Diving	Women's 3 m synchronized springboard	15 July
Bronze	Jonathan Paredes	High diving	Men's high diving	24 July

== Artistic swimming ==
Mexico entered 10 artistic swimmers.

Women

Athlete	Event	Preliminaries		Final	
Athlete	Event	Points	Rank	Points	Rank
Nuria Diosdado; Joana Jiménez	Duet technical routine	84.5751	11 Q	84.9938	11
Nuria Diosdado; Joana Jiménez	Duet free routine	85.8667	11 Q	86.1000	11
Regina Alférez; Teresa Ixchel Alonso; Nuria Diosdado; Joanna Jiménez; Luisa Samanta Rodríguez; Jessica Sobrino; Ana Karen Soto; Amaya Velázquez; Glenda Inzunza (R); Pamela Nuzhet Toscano (R)	Team technical routine	85.4235	10 Q	85.6618	10
Regina Alférez; Teresa Ixchel Alonso; Nuria Diosdado; Joanna Jiménez; Luisa Samanta Rodríguez; Jessica Sobrino; Ana Karen Soto; Amaya Velázquez; Glenda Inzunza (R); Pamela Nuzhet Toscano (R)	Team free routine	86.3333	10 Q	87.0333	10

Legend: (R) = Reserve Athlete

== Diving ==
Mexico entered 16 divers.

Men

Athlete	Event	Preliminaries		Semifinals		Final	
Athlete	Event	Points	Rank	Points	Rank	Points	Rank
Jahir Ocampo	1 m springboard	324.30	21	—		did not advance	
Rommel Pacheco	1 m springboard	390.40	4 Q	—		420.15	2nd place, silver medalist(s)
Rommel Pacheco	3 m springboard	427.30	6 Q	451.55	6 Q	443.30	8
Alejandro Islas	3 m springboard	295.90	50	did not advance			
Kevin Berlín	10 m platform	390.80	18 Q	361.85	18	did not advance	
Iván García	10 m platform	469.55	7 Q	368.80	16	did not advance	
Yahel Castillo; Juan Celaya	3 m synchronized springboard	366.60	9 Q	—		413.94	3rd place, bronze medalist(s)
Kevin Berlín; Iván García	10 m synchronized platform	387.33	5 Q	—		400.71	7

Women

Athlete	Event	Preliminaries		Semifinals		Final	
Athlete	Event	Points	Rank	Points	Rank	Points	Rank
Melany Hernández	1 m springboard	231.95	13	—		did not advance	
Aranza Vázquez	1 m springboard	217.50	18	—		did not advance	
Paola Espinosa	3 m springboard	250.15	24	did not advance			
Dolores Hernández	3 m springboard	240.90	30	did not advance			
Gabriela Agúndez	10 m platform	219.45	32	did not advance			
Alejandra Orozco	10 m platform	281.35	17 Q	303.90	13	did not advance	
Paola Espinosa; Melany Hernández	3 m synchronized springboard	265.50	8 Q	—		294.90	3rd place, bronze medalist(s)
Gabriela Agúndez; Alejandra Orozco	10 m synchronized platform	281.28	6 Q	—		274.68	9

Mixed

Athlete	Event	Final	
Athlete	Event	Points	Rank
Dolores Hernández; Osmar Oliveira	3 m synchronized springboard	288.30	6
José Balleza; María Sánchez	10 m synchronized platform	287.64	3rd place, bronze medalist(s)
Paola Espinosa; Iván García	Team	319.55	10

== High diving ==
Mexico qualified three male and one female high divers.

Men

Athlete	Event	Points	Rank
Sergio Guzman	Men's high diving	328.45	11
Jonathan Paredes	Men's high diving	430.15	3rd place, bronze medalist(s)
Diego Rivero	Men's high diving	219.65	19

Women

Athlete	Event	Points	Rank
Adriana Jiménez	Women's high diving	297.90	2nd place, silver medalist(s)

== Open water swimming ==
Mexico qualified three male and three female open water swimmers.

Men

Athlete	Event	Time	Rank
Fernando Betanzos	Men's 5 km	56:25.1	46
Fernando Betanzos	Men's 10 km	1:56:07.9	57
Daniel Delgadillo	Men's 5 km	53:43.6	24
Daniel Delgadillo	Men's 25 km	5:02:41.6	17
Arturo Pérez Vertti	Men's 10 km	1:52:42.6	50

Women

Athlete	Event	Time	Rank
Martha Aguilar	Women's 10 km	2:01:42.1	43
Lourdes Sandoval	Women's 5 km	1:02:00.5	45
Martha Sandoval	Women's 5 km	59:51.3	31
Martha Sandoval	Women's 10 km	2:01:17.5	41

Mixed

Athlete	Event	Time	Rank
Fernando Betanzos; Arturo Pérez Vertti; Martha Sandoval; Martha Aguilar	Team	58:37.0	17

== Swimming ==
Mexico has entered four swimmers.

Men

Athlete	Event	Heat		Semifinal		Final	
Athlete	Event	Time	Rank	Time	Rank	Time	Rank
Horus Briseño	50 m freestyle	23.65	67	did not advance			
Horus Briseño	100 m freestyle	50.80	60	did not advance			
Miguel Chavez	100 m breaststroke	1:02.37	45	did not advance			
Miguel Chavez	200 m breaststroke	DSQ		did not advance			

Women

Athlete	Event	Heat		Semifinal		Final	
Athlete	Event	Time	Rank	Time	Rank	Time	Rank
Miriam Guevara	100 m butterfly	1:01.51	38	did not advance			
Maria Jimenez	100 m breaststroke	1:11.83	38	did not advance			
Maria Jimenez	200 m breaststroke	2:37.49	29	did not advance			

Mixed

Athlete	Event	Heat		Final	
Athlete	Event	Time	Rank	Time	Rank
Miriam Guevara; Miguel Chavez; María Jiménez; Horus Briseño	4 × 100 m mixed medley relay	DSQ		did not advance	
