= Sweden at the 2019 World Aquatics Championships =

- Flag of Sweden
- World Aquatics code: SWE
- National federation: Swedish Swimming Federation
- Website: svensksimidrott.se (in Swedish)

in Gwangju, South Korea
- Medals Ranked 13th: Gold 1 Silver 2 Bronze 2 Total 5

World Aquatics Championships appearances (overview)
- 1973; 1975; 1978; 1982; 1986; 1991; 1994; 1998; 2001; 2003; 2005; 2007; 2009; 2011; 2013; 2015; 2017; 2019; 2022; 2023; 2024; 2025

Sweden competed at the 2019 World Aquatics Championships in Gwangju, South Korea from 12 to 28 July.

== Medalists ==
Medal	Name	Sport	Event	Date
Gold	Sarah Sjöström	Swimming	Women's 50 metre butterfly	27 July
Silver	Sarah Sjöström	Swimming	Women's 100 metre butterfly	22 July
Silver	Sarah Sjöström	Swimming	Women's 50 metre freestyle	28 July
Bronze	Sarah Sjöström	Swimming	Women's 200 metre freestyle	24 July
Bronze	Sarah Sjöström	Swimming	Women's 100 metre freestyle	26 July

== Diving ==
Sweden entered four divers.

Men

Athlete	Event	Preliminaries		Semifinals		Final	
Athlete	Event	Points	Rank	Points	Rank	Points	Rank
Vinko Paradzik	1 m springboard	326.40	20	—N/a		did not advance	
Vinko Paradzik	10 m platform	365.90	22	did not advance			

Women

Athlete	Event	Preliminaries		Semifinals		Final	
Athlete	Event	Points	Rank	Points	Rank	Points	Rank
Emilia Nilsson	1 m springboard	231.50	14	—N/a		did not advance	
Emilia Nilsson	3 m springboard	176.60	47	did not advance			
Emma Gullstrand	1 m springboard	194.00	36	—N/a		did not advance	
Emma Gullstrand	3 m springboard	258.10	19	did not advance			
Ellen Ek	10 m platform	256.20	25	did not advance			

Mixed

Athlete	Event	Final	
Athlete	Event	Points	Rank
Vinko Paradzik; Emma Gullstrand	Synchronized 3 m springboard	253.62	14
Vinko Paradzik; Ellen Ek	Team	315.65	11

== Open water swimming ==
Sweden qualified two male open water swimmers.

Men

Athlete	Event	Time	Rank
Victor Johansson	Men's 10 km	1:50:14.8	34
Elliot Sodemann	Men's 10 km	1:50:16.0	37

== Swimming ==
Sweden entered seven swimmers.

Men

Athlete	Event	Heat		Semifinal		Final	
Athlete	Event	Time	Rank	Time	Rank	Time	Rank
Erik Persson	100 m breaststroke	1:00.66	26	did not advance			
Erik Persson	200 m breaststroke	2:08.87	4 Q	2:08.00	5 Q	2:08.39	8
Simon Sjödin	100 m butterfly	53.70	35	did not advance			
Simon Sjödin	200 m individual medley	2:00.67	21	did not advance			

Women

Athlete	Event	Heat		Semifinal		Final	
Athlete	Event	Time	Rank	Time	Rank	Time	Rank
Michelle Coleman	50 m freestyle	24.95	=12 Q	24.94	14	did not advance	
Michelle Coleman	100 m freestyle	54.01	15 Q	54.56	16	did not advance	
Michelle Coleman	100 m backstroke	1:01.95	34	did not advance			
Hanna Eriksson	800 m freestyle	8:52.14	28	—N/a		did not advance	
Louise Hansson	50 m backstroke	29.12	26	did not advance			
Louise Hansson	100 m backstroke	DNS		did not advance			
Louise Hansson	50 m butterfly	25.97	6 Q	26.10	10	did not advance	
Louise Hansson	100 m butterfly	57.50	7 Q	57.10	8 Q	57.16	7
Sophie Hansson	50 m breaststroke	30.96	9 Q	31.12	10	did not advance	
Sophie Hansson	100 m breaststroke	1:08.39	20	did not advance			
Sophie Hansson	200 m breaststroke	2:29.97	23	did not advance			
Sarah Sjöström	50 m freestyle	24.26	1 Q	24.05	1 Q	24.07	2nd place, silver medalist(s)
Sarah Sjöström	100 m freestyle	53.11	2 Q	52.43	1 Q	52.46	3rd place, bronze medalist(s)
Sarah Sjöström	200 m freestyle	1:55.14	1 Q	1:55.70	4 Q	1:54.78	3rd place, bronze medalist(s)
Sarah Sjöström	50 m butterfly	25.39	1 Q	24.79	1 Q	25.02	1st place, gold medalist(s)
Sarah Sjöström	100 m butterfly	56.45	1 Q	56.29	1 Q	56.22	2nd place, silver medalist(s)
Sarah Sjöström; Michelle Coleman; Louise Hansson; Sophie Hansson; Hanna Eriksson*	4 × 100 m freestyle relay	3:36.03	3 Q	—N/a		3:36.33	6
Michelle Coleman; Sophie Hansson; Louise Hansson; Sarah Sjöström	4 × 100 m medley relay	3:59.40	6 Q	—N/a		3:58.39	7

Legend: (*) = Swimmers who participated in the heat only.
