= Katrina Young =

American diver (born 1992)

Personal information
- Born: January 10, 1992 (age 34) Shoreline, Washington, U.S.
- Education: Florida State University
- Height: 5 ft 4 in (163 cm)
- Weight: 132 lb (60 kg)

Sport
- Country: United States
- Sport: Diving
- Event: 10 m synchro
Medal record
World Championships
Silver medal – second place	2022 Budapest	10 m synchro
Bronze medal – third place	2019 Gwangju	10 m synchro
Bronze medal – third place	2019 Gwangju	Mixed team

Katrina Young (born January 10, 1992) is an American diver. She competed for the United States in the women's 10-meter diving at the 2016 Summer Olympics in Rio de Janeiro and in the 10-meter platform contest at the 2020 Summer Olympics in Tokyo.

== Early life ==
She was born on January 10, 1992, in Shoreline, Washington, to parents Patrick and Carol Young. Her grandmother, Elaine Silburn, was an Olympian who competed in Track and Field for Canada at the London 1948 Olympic Games.

Young graduated from Shorecrest High School in 2010.

== Diving ==
As a child, Young first took up gymnastics. It wasn't until her older sister took an interest in swimming that Young followed in her footsteps and began diving at age 9. She competed as a diver for Florida State University from 2010 to 2015.

=== 2012 US Olympic Trials ===
She made the final in platform diving at the 2012 US Olympic Trials, and did not qualify to compete at the 2012 Summer Olympics.

=== 2016 Summer Olympics ===
In June 2016, Young qualified for the U.S. Olympic team for diving in the women's 10-meter platform. Young was in fourth place going into the last dive at the Olympic trials, but a strong final dive allowed her to secure the second qualifying spot.

At the 2016 Summer Olympics in Rio de Janeiro, Brazil in August 2016, Young finished 13th in the semifinals of the 10-meter platform, not advancing to the final.

=== 2019 World Aquatics Championships ===
2019 World Championships
Bronze medal – third place	10 m synchro platform	304.86
Bronze medal – third place	mixed team	357.60

In July 2019 at the 2019 World Aquatics Championships held in Gwangju, South Korea, Young medaled in two events. She won the bronze medal with her partner Samantha Bromberg in the synchronized 10-meter platform with a score of 304.86 in the final. Young won a second bronze medal in the mixed team event with her teammate and second diver for the event, Andrew Capobianco, they scored a 357.60 in the final. This was the first medal for the United States at the World Championships in a synchronized diving event since 2009.

=== 2020 Summer Olympics ===
On June 13, 2021, Young qualified for the U.S. Olympic team at the 2020 Summer Olympics for diving in the women's 10-meter platform for her second Olympics, placing second.

In the preliminary round of competition in the 10-meter platform, Young placed 17th with a score of 286.65 and advanced to the semifinal. She scored a total of 263.60 points in the semifinal, finished in 17th place, and did not qualify for the final.

=== 2022 World Aquatics Championships ===
On June 30, 2022, at the 2022 World Aquatics Championships, Young and her partner Delaney Schnell won the silver medal in the synchronized 10 meter platform with a score of 299.40. Schnell was originally supposed to compete with Tarrin Gilliland, but Gilliland withdrew due to injury a few weeks before the competition, and Young took her place.

=== 2022 Diving World Cup ===
At the 2022 FINA Diving World Cup, held in October in Berlin, Germany, Young won a silver medal in the 10 meter synchronized event as well as a gold medal in the mixed team event with a team score of 375.80 points.

== Personal ==
Young has stated that she draws inspiration from musical rhythms for her diving.

Young started a YouTube channel on November 21, 2011. On her channel Young publishes videos directly related to her diving, including footage of her performing dives, as well as indirectly related to her diving, such as her practicing synchronization in the form singing and playing a guitar or ukulele at the same time. These musical rhythm videos feature songs she wrote herself and songs written by others.
