= Lu Wei (diver) =

Chinese diver

Personal information
- Nationality: Chinese
- Born: 10 December 2005 (age 20)

Sport
- Country: China
- Sport: Diving
- Events: 10 m, 10 m synchro
Medal record
World Championships
Gold medal – first place	2019 Gwangju	10 m synchro
Silver medal – second place	2019 Gwangju	10 m platform
Asian Games
Gold medal – first place	2026 Aichi-Nagoya	10 m synchro
World University Games
Gold medal – first place	2025 Rhine-Ruhr	10 m platform
Gold medal – first place	2025 Rhine-Ruhr	10 m synchro

Lu Wei (Chinese: 卢为; pinyin: Lú Wéi, born 10 December 2005) is a Chinese diver.

She participated at the 2019 World Aquatics Championships, winning a medal.
