= Samantha Bromberg =

American diver

Personal information
- Nationality: American
- Born: July 12, 1995 (age 30) Bexley, Ohio, U.S.
- Height: 5 ft 2 in (157 cm)

Sport
- Country: United States
- Sport: Diving
- Event: 10 m synchro
- Club: Longhorn Aquatics
Medal record
World Championships
Bronze medal – third place	2019 Gwangju	10 m synchro

Samantha "Murphy" Bromberg (born July 12, 1995) is a former American diver.

Bromberg is the daughter of Danny and Karen Bromberg. She graduated from Bexley High School in 2013 and attended the University of Texas.

She participated at the 2019 World Aquatics Championships, winning a medal.

As a collegian, Bromberg made All-America four times and was the Big 12 Conference Diver of the Year in 2017-2018 and 2018-2019 in addition to being a Big 12 champion five times. She also was a finalist at the U.S. Olympic Diving Trials in 2016 and the FINA World Championships in 2013.

On July 14, 2019, Bromberg and Katrina Young won the bronze medal in the FINA World Championships' synchronized 10-meter diving event, clinching the United States' first spot in the 2020 Olympic Games.
