= Jack LeVant =

American swimmer

Personal information
- Nationality: American
- Born: October 3, 1999 (age 26)
- Height: 6 ft 3 in (191 cm)

Sport
- Sport: Swimming
- Strokes: Freestyle
- Club: Alto Swim Club
Medal record
World Championships
Bronze medal – third place	2019 Gwangju	4×200 m freestyle

Jack Harrison LeVant (born October 3, 1999) is an American swimmer, currently attending Stanford University.

He participated at the 2019 World Aquatics Championships, swimming a leg of a preliminary heat for the USA men's 4×200-metre freestyle relay alongside Andrew Seliskar, Jack Conger, and Zach Apple; although LeVant did not swim in the final, he was awarded a bronze medal as the USA team finished third.
