= Diving at the 2019 World Aquatics Championships =

- Host city: Gwangju, South Korea
- Date(s): 12–20 July
- Venue(s): Nambu University Municipal Aquatics Center
- Nations participating: 47
- Athletes participating: 267
- Events: 13

Diving at the 2019 World Aquatics Championships was held from 12 to 20 July 2019.

== Events ==
The following events were contested:

- 1 m springboard
- 3 m springboard
- 10 m platform
- 3 m springboard synchronized
- 10 m platform synchronized
- 3 m springboard mixed synchronized
- 10 m platform mixed synchronized
- Team event

Individual events consisted of preliminaries, semifinals and finals. The order of divers in the preliminary round was determined by computerized random selection, during the technical meeting. The 18 divers with the highest scores in the preliminaries proceed to the semifinals.

The semifinal consisted of the top 18 ranked divers from the preliminary competition and the final consisted of the top 12 ranked divers from the semifinal.

== Schedule ==
13 events were held.

All time are local (UTC+9).

Date	Time	Event
12 July 2019	11:00	Men's 1 metre springboard preliminaries
12 July 2019	15:30	Women's 1 metre springboard preliminaries
13 July 2019	10:00	Men's Synchronized 3 metre springboard preliminaries
13 July 2019	13:00	Mixed Synchronized 10 metre platform final
13 July 2019	15:30	Women's 1 metre springboard final
13 July 2019	20:45	Men's Synchronized 3 metre springboard final
14 July 2019	10:00	Women's Synchronized 10 metre platform preliminaries
14 July 2019	15:30	Men's 1 metre springboard final
14 July 2019	20:45	Women's Synchronized 10 metre platform final
15 July 2019	10:00	Women's Synchronized 3 metre springboard preliminaries
15 July 2019	13:00	Men's Synchronized 10 metre platform preliminaries
15 July 2019	15:30	Women's Synchronized 3 metre springboard final
15 July 2019	20:45	Men's Synchronized 10 metre platform final
16 July 2019	10:00	Women's 10 metre platform preliminaries
16 July 2019	15:30	Women's 10 metre platform semifinal
16 July 2019	20:45	Team event
17 July 2019	10:00	Men's 3 metre springboard preliminaries
17 July 2019	15:30	Men's 3 metre springboard preliminaries semifinal
17 July 2019	20:45	Women's 10 metre platform final
18 July 2019	10:00	Women's 3 metre springboard preliminaries
18 July 2019	15:30	Women's 3 metre springboard semifinal
18 July 2019	20:45	Men's 3 metre springboard final
19 July 2019	10:00	Men's 10 metre platform preliminaries
19 July 2019	15:30	Men's 10 metre platform semifinal
19 July 2019	20:45	Women's 3 metre springboard final
20 July 2019	15:30	Mixed Synchronized 3 metre springboard final
20 July 2019	20:45	Men's 10 metre platform final

== Medal summary ==
=== Medal table ===
* Host nation (South Korea)

Rank	Nation	Gold	Silver	Bronze	Total
1	China	12	4	1	17
2	Australia	1	0	1	2
3	Russia	0	3	1	4
4	Canada	0	2	0	2
5	Mexico	0	1	3	4
5	United States	0	1	3	4
7	Great Britain	0	1	2	3
8	Malaysia	0	1	0	1
9	Germany	0	0	1	1
9	South Korea*	0	0	1	1
Totals (10 entries)		13	13	13	39

=== Men ===
Event	Gold		Silver		Bronze	
1 metre springboard	Wang Zongyuan; China	440.25	Rommel Pacheco; Mexico	420.15	Peng Jianfeng; China	415.00
3 metre springboard	Xie Siyi; China	545.45	Cao Yuan; China	517.85	Jack Laugher; Great Britain	504.55
10 metre platform	Yang Jian; China	598.65	Yang Hao; China	585.75	Aleksandr Bondar; Russia	541.05
Synchronized; 3 metre springboard	China (CHN); Cao Yuan; Xie Siyi	439.74	Great Britain (GBR); Daniel Goodfellow; Jack Laugher	415.02	Mexico (MEX); Yahel Castillo; Juan Celaya	413.94
Synchronized; 10 metre platform	China (CHN); Cao Yuan; Chen Aisen	486.93	Russia (RUS); Aleksandr Bondar; Viktor Minibaev	444.60	Great Britain (GBR); Tom Daley; Matty Lee	425.91

=== Women ===
Event	Gold		Silver		Bronze	
1 metre springboard	Chen Yiwen; China	285.45	Sarah Bacon; United States	262.00	Kim Su-ji; South Korea	257.20
3 metre springboard	Shi Tingmao; China	391.00	Wang Han; China	372.85	Maddison Keeney; Australia	367.05
10 metre platform	Chen Yuxi; China	439.00	Lu Wei; China	377.80	Delaney Schnell; United States	364.20
Synchronized; 3 metre springboard	China (CHN); Shi Tingmao; Wang Han	342.00	Canada (CAN); Jennifer Abel; Mélissa Citrini-Beaulieu	311.10	Mexico (MEX); Paola Espinosa; Melany Hernández	294.90
Synchronized; 10 metre platform	China (CHN); Lu Wei; Zhang Jiaqi	345.24	Malaysia (MAS); Leong Mun Yee; Pandelela Rinong	312.72	United States (USA); Samantha Bromberg; Katrina Young	304.86

=== Mixed ===
Event	Gold		Silver		Bronze	
3 metre springboard	Australia (AUS); Matthew Carter; Maddison Keeney	304.86	Canada (CAN); François Imbeau-Dulac; Jennifer Abel	304.08	Germany (GER); Lou Massenberg; Tina Punzel	301.62
10 metre platform	China (CHN); Lian Junjie; Si Yajie	346.14	Russia (RUS); Viktor Minibaev; Ekaterina Beliaeva	311.28	Mexico (MEX); José Balleza; María Sánchez	287.64
Team	China (CHN); Yang Jian; Lin Shan	416.65	Russia (RUS); Sergey Nazin; Yulia Timoshinina	390.05	United States (USA); Andrew Capobianco; Katrina Young	357.60
