= Swimming at the 2019 World Aquatics Championships – Men's 100 metre butterfly =

Men's 100 metre butterfly at the 2019 World Aquatics Championships
- Venue: Nambu University Municipal Aquatics Center
- Location: Gwangju, South Korea
- Dates: 26 July (heats and semifinals); 27 July (final)
- Competitors: 78 from 73 nations
- Winning time: 49.66

Medalists
gold medal	Caeleb Dressel	United States
silver medal	Andrey Minakov	Russia
bronze medal	Chad le Clos	South Africa

The Men's 100 metre butterfly competition at the 2019 World Championships was held on 26 and 27 July 2019. The defending champion Caeleb Dressel broke Michael Phelps' ten-year-old record by 0.32 second in the semi-final, setting a new world-record time of 49.50 seconds. Dressel won the final held the following day, defending his title.

== Records ==
Prior to the competition, the existing world and championship records were as follows.

World record	Michael Phelps (USA)	49.82	Rome, Italy	1 August 2009
Competition record	Michael Phelps (USA)	49.82	Rome, Italy	1 August 2009

The following new records were set during this competition.

Date	Event	Name	Nationality	Time	Record
26 July	Semifinal	Caeleb Dressel	United States	49.50	WR

== Results ==
=== Heats ===
The heats were held on 26 July at 10:00.

Rank	Heat	Lane	Name	Nationality	Time	Notes
1	9	4	Caeleb Dressel	United States	50.28	Q
2	7	2	Kristóf Milák	Hungary	51.42	Q
3	9	3	Andrey Minakov	Russia	51.54	Q
4	7	4	Chad le Clos	South Africa	51.58	Q
5	9	5	Mehdy Metella	France	51.65	Q
6	9	6	Vinicius Lanza	Brazil	51.83	Q
7	9	7	László Cseh	Hungary	51.88	Q
8	8	2	Matthew Temple	Australia	51.89	Q
9	8	5	Jack Conger	United States	51.96	Q
10	7	3	Marius Kusch	Germany	52.05	Q
11	8	3	James Guy	Great Britain	52.06	Q
12	8	6	Naoki Mizunuma	Japan	52.23	Q
13	7	1	Tomer Frankel	Israel	52.36	Q
14	7	6	Li Zhuhao	China	52.44	Q
14	9	1	Yauhen Tsurkin	Belarus	52.44	Q
14	9	2	David Morgan	Australia	52.44	Q
17	7	8	Adilbek Mussin	Kazakhstan	52.46	
18	8	9	Deividas Margevičius	Lithuania	52.55	NR
19	7	7	Federico Burdisso	Italy	52.65	
20	8	7	Konrad Czerniak	Poland	52.77	
21	6	2	Ümitcan Gureş	Turkey	52.86	
22	9	8	Mathys Goosen	Netherlands	52.87	
23	6	4	Kregor Zirk	Estonia	52.92	
24	7	5	Joseph Schooling	Singapore	52.93	
24	8	0	Josiah Binnema	Canada	52.93	
26	8	4	Piero Codia	Italy	53.09	
27	8	8	Daniel Martin	Romania	53.15	
28	6	1	Denys Kesil	Ukraine	53.39	
29	7	9	Andreas Vazaios	Greece	53.41	
30	8	1	Ryan Coetzee	South Africa	53.46	
31	5	6	Mihajlo Čeprkalo	Bosnia and Herzegovina	53.52	NR
32	5	4	Chu Chen-ping	Chinese Taipei	53.58	
33	6	6	Riku Pöytäkivi	Finland	53.62	
34	6	3	Yun Seok-hwan	South Korea	53.64	
35	6	5	Simon Sjödin	Sweden	53.70	
36	5	5	Bradlee Ashby	New Zealand	53.73	
37	6	9	Benjamin Hockin	Paraguay	53.78	
38	5	3	Chan Jie	Malaysia	53.85	
39	6	8	Roberto Strelkov	Argentina	54.11	
40	5	7	Yusuf Tibazi	Morocco	54.21	
41	6	0	Sajan Prakash	India	54.30	
42	5	8	Nicholas Lim	Hong Kong	54.36	
43	5	0	Navaphat Wongcharoen	Thailand	54.38	
44	6	7	Glenn Victor Sutanto	Indonesia	54.57	
45	1	5	Abbas Qali	Kuwait	54.67	
46	4	4	Cadell Lyons	Trinidad and Tobago	54.79	
47	5	2	Steven Aimable	Senegal	54.94	NR
47	5	9	Abeiku Jackson	Ghana	54.94	
49	5	1	Ralph Goveia	Zambia	55.14	
50	4	6	Ayman Kelzi	Syria	55.15	NR
51	4	3	Alireza Yavari	Iran	55.63	
52	4	5	Keanan Dols	Jamaica	55.66	
53	4	2	Teimuraz Kobakhidze	Georgia	56.03	
54	4	1	Bryan Alvaréz	Costa Rica	56.04	
55	4	0	Jayhan Odlum-Smith	Saint Lucia	56.31	
56	2	5	Artur Barseghyan	Armenia	56.52	
57	4	7	Seggio Bernardina	Curaçao	56.54	
58	3	5	Yousif Bu Arish	Saudi Arabia	56.58	
59	4	8	Yacob Al-Khulaifi	Qatar	56.62	
60	3	4	Rami Anis	FINA Independent Athletes	57.26	
61	3	3	Jesse Washington	Bermuda	57.29	
62	3	8	Salvador Gordo	Angola	57.32	
63	1	3	Ifeakachuku Nmor	Nigeria	57.65	
64	3	7	Simon Bachmann	Seychelles	58.06	
65	3	1	Bernat Lomero	Andorra	58.12	
66	4	9	Fernando Ponce	Guatemala	58.26	
67	1	4	Abdulla Ahmed	Bahrain	58.44	NR
68	3	0	Collins Saliboko	Tanzania	58.82	
69	3	6	Davidson Vincent	Haiti	58.91	
70	3	2	Mathieu Marquet	Mauritius	1:00.03	
71	2	1	Daniel Christian	Eritrea	1:00.77	
72	2	3	Ousmane Touré	Mali	1:00.81	
73	3	9	Emilien Puyo	Monaco	1:01.12	
74	2	2	Lim Keouodom	Cambodia	1:01.17	
75	2	8	Simanga Dlamini	Eswatini	1:02.39	
76	2	4	Belly-Cresus Ganira	Burundi	1:03.34	
77	2	7	Achala Gekabel	Ethiopia	1:06.40	
	2	6	Irvin Hoost	Suriname	DSQ	
	7	0	Viktor Bromer	Denmark	DNS	
	9	0	Tomoe Zenimoto Hvas	Norway	DNS	
	9	9	Antani Ivanov	Bulgaria	DNS	

=== Semifinals ===
The semifinals were held on 26 July at 20:10.

==== Semifinal 1 ====
Rank	Lane	Name	Nationality	Time	Notes
1	4	Kristóf Milák	Hungary	50.95	Q
2	5	Chad le Clos	South Africa	51.40	Q
3	2	Marius Kusch	Germany	51.50	Q
4	6	Matthew Temple	Australia	51.70	Q
5	7	Naoki Mizunuma	Japan	51.71	
6	3	Vinicius Lanza	Brazil	51.92	
7	1	Li Zhuhao	China	52.00	
8	8	David Morgan	Australia	52.20	

==== Semifinal 2 ====
Rank	Lane	Name	Nationality	Time	Notes
1	4	Caeleb Dressel	United States	49.50	Q, WR
2	5	Andrey Minakov	Russia	50.94	Q, NR
3	3	Mehdy Metella	France	51.62	Q
4	7	James Guy	Great Britain	51.69	Q
5	6	László Cseh	Hungary	51.86	
6	2	Jack Conger	United States	51.91	
7	1	Tomer Frankel	Israel	52.15	NR
8	8	Yauhen Tsurkin	Belarus	52.55	

=== Final ===
The final was started on 27 July at 20:43.

Rank	Lane	Name	Nationality	Time	Notes
1st place, gold medalist(s)	4	Caeleb Dressel	United States	49.66	
2nd place, silver medalist(s)	5	Andrey Minakov	Russia	50.83	NR
3rd place, bronze medalist(s)	6	Chad le Clos	South Africa	51.16	
4	3	Kristóf Milák	Hungary	51.26	
5	7	Mehdy Metella	France	51.38	
6	8	Matthew Temple	Australia	51.51	
7	1	James Guy	Great Britain	51.62	
8	2	Marius Kusch	Germany	51.66	
