= Open water swimming at the 2019 World Aquatics Championships – Women's 25 km =

Women's 25 km at the 2019 World Aquatics Championships
- Venue: Yeosu Expo Ocean Park
- Location: Gwangju, South Korea
- Dates: 19 July
- Competitors: 20 from 13 nations
- Winning time: 5:08:03.0

Medalists
gold medal	Ana Marcela Cunha	Brazil
silver medal	Finnia Wunram	Germany
bronze medal	Lara Grangeon	France

The women's 25 km competition at the 2019 World Aquatics Championships was held on 19 July 2019.

== Race ==
The race was started at 08:00.

Results
Rank	Swimmer	Nationality	Time
1st place, gold medalist(s)	Ana Marcela Cunha	Brazil	5:08:03.0
2nd place, silver medalist(s)	Finnia Wunram	Germany	5:08:11.6
3rd place, bronze medalist(s)	Lara Grangeon	France	5:08:21.2
4	Lisa Pou	France	5:08:28.4
5	Erica Sullivan	United States	5:11:23.2
6	Anna Olasz	Hungary	5:11:51.5
7	Arianna Bridi	Italy	5:11:52.6
8	Onon Sömenek	Hungary	5:11:54.7
9	Katy Campbell	United States	5:11:59.6
10	Samantha Arévalo	Ecuador	5:12:22.1
11	Sofia Kolesnikova	Russia	5:12:30.0
12	Lea Boy	Germany	5:12:40.6
13	Barbara Pozzobon	Italy	5:12:53.7
14	Ren Luomeng	China	5:32:13.1
15	Lenka Štěrbová	Czech Republic	5:45:19.3
16	Qu Fang	China	5:59:12.3
	Angélica André	Portugal	DNF
	Anastasia Basalduk	Russia	DNF
	Chelsea Gubecka	Australia	DNF
	Karolína Balážiková	Slovakia	DNF
	Sharon van Rouwendaal	Netherlands	DNS
