= Swimming at the 2019 World Aquatics Championships – Men's 50 metre butterfly =

Men's 50 metre butterfly at the 2019 World Aquatics Championships
- Venue: Nambu University Municipal Aquatics Center
- Location: Gwangju, South Korea
- Dates: 21 July (heats and semifinals); 22 July (final)
- Competitors: 94 from 87 nations
- Winning time: 22.35

Medalists
gold medal	Caeleb Dressel	United States
silver medal	Oleg Kostin	Russia
bronze medal	Nicholas Santos	Brazil

The Men's 50 metre butterfly competition at the 2019 World Championships was held on 21 and 22 July 2019. The defending champion Ben Proud finished 7th in the final. The winner, Caeleb Dressel, set a competition record in the final, winning in 22.35 seconds.

== Records ==
Prior to the competition, the existing world and championship records were as follows.

World record	Andriy Govorov (UKR)	22.27	Rome, Italy	1 July 2018
Competition record	Milorad Čavić (SRB)	22.67	Rome, Italy	27 July 2009

The following new records were set during this competition.

Date	Event	Name	Nationality	Time	Record
21 July	Semifinal	Caeleb Dressel	United States	22.57	CR
22 July	Final	Caeleb Dressel	United States	22.35	CR

== Results ==
=== Heats ===
The heats were held on 21 July at 11:02.

Rank	Heat	Lane	Name	Nationality	Time	Notes
1	8	5	Caeleb Dressel	United States	22.84	Q
1	10	4	Andriy Govorov	Ukraine	22.84	Q
3	8	4	Oleg Kostin	Russia	23.01	Q
4	10	6	Szebasztián Szabó	Hungary	23.07	Q
5	9	5	Michael Andrew	United States	23.09	Q
6	10	8	Daniel Zaitsev	Estonia	23.26	Q, NR
7	10	3	Andrey Zhilkin	Russia	23.27	Q
8	9	3	Dylan Carter	Trinidad and Tobago	23.33	Q
9	10	5	Ben Proud	Great Britain	23.35	Q
10	8	9	Maxime Grousset	France	23.36	Q
11	9	4	Nicholas Santos	Brazil	23.48	Q
12	9	8	Meiron Cheruti	Israel	23.49	Q, NR
13	8	3	Kristian Golomeev	Greece	23.51	Q
14	10	7	Piero Codia	Italy	23.52	Q
15	7	5	Abdelrahman Sameh	Egypt	23.54	Q, NR
16	8	6	Konrad Czerniak	Poland	23.63	Q
17	7	3	Adilbek Mussin	Kazakhstan	23.64	NR
18	9	0	Tomoe Zenimoto Hvas	Norway	23.67	
19	9	6	Yauhen Tsurkin	Belarus	23.70	
20	9	1	Joseph Schooling	Singapore	23.73	
21	9	2	Naoki Mizunuma	Japan	23.74	
22	8	0	Niksa Stojkovski	Norway	23.75	
23	10	9	Cui Junming	China	23.80	
24	8	2	Mathys Goosen	Netherlands	23.84	
25	7	8	Umitcan Gures	Turkey	23.86	
25	10	2	Marius Kusch	Germany	23.86	
27	8	7	Serhiy Shevtsov	Ukraine	23.87	
28	7	1	Julien Henx	Luxembourg	23.91	NR
28	8	1	Vinicius Lanza	Brazil	23.91	
30	8	8	Yu Hexin	China	23.92	
31	9	9	Riku Pöytäkivi	Finland	23.93	
32	10	1	László Cseh	Hungary	23.94	
33	7	4	Roberto Strelkov	Argentina	23.99	
34	10	0	Tadas Duškinas	Lithuania	24.02	
35	7	0	Nikola Miljenić	Croatia	24.06	
36	9	7	Ryan Coetzee	South Africa	24.13	
37	6	4	Yusuf Tibazi	Morocco	24.18	
38	7	6	Daniel Hunter	New Zealand	24.21	
39	7	2	Benjamin Hockin	Paraguay	24.23	
40	7	7	Antani Ivanov	Bulgaria	24.28	
41	7	9	Virdhawal Khade	India	24.41	
42	5	4	Vladimír Štefánik	Slovakia	24.47	
43	6	2	George-Adrian Ratiu	Romania	24.48	
44	6	8	Joshua Edwards	Canada	24.52	
45	6	1	Ng Cheuk Yin	Hong Kong	24.54	
46	6	6	Paul le Nguyễn	Vietnam	24.58	
47	6	3	Mihajlo Čeprkalo	Bosnia and Herzegovina	24.59	
48	6	5	Heo Hwan	South Korea	24.63	
49	6	7	Glenn Sutanto	Indonesia	24.84	
50	6	9	Abeiku Jackson	Ghana	24.85	
51	5	5	Aleksi Schmid	Switzerland	24.88	
52	5	2	Abbas Qali	Kuwait	24.91	
53	6	0	Lin Chien-liang	Chinese Taipei	24.96	
54	5	3	Ralph Goveia	Zambia	25.08	
54	5	6	Jie Chan	Malaysia	25.08	
56	4	4	Boško Radulović	Montenegro	25.11	
57	4	3	Daniel Francisco	Angola	25.15	
58	5	1	Bernat Lomero	Andorra	25.24	
58	5	7	Seggio Bernardina	Curaçao	25.24	
60	2	2	Ifeakachuku Nmor	Nigeria	25.34	
61	4	6	Erico Cuna	Mozambique	25.40	
62	5	0	Issa Mohamed	Kenya	25.44	
63	5	9	Jayhan Odlum-Smith	Saint Lucia	25.47	
64	5	8	Yousif Bu Arish	Saudi Arabia	25.48	
65	4	1	Stefano Mitchell	Antigua and Barbuda	25.69	
66	3	8	Irvin Hoost	Suriname	25.97	
67	1	3	Vahan Mkhitaryan	Armenia	26.06	
68	4	7	Rami Anis	FINA Independent Athletes	26.24	
69	2	9	Abdulla Ahmed	Bahrain	26.69	NR
70	2	8	Kerry Ollivierre	Grenada	26.93	
71	4	5	Hilal Hilal	Tanzania	27.13	
72	2	0	Keouodom Lim	Cambodia	27.33	
73	4	0	Mohammed Jibali	Libya	27.53	
74	2	1	Ousmane Touré	Mali	27.67	
75	2	4	Troy Pina	Cape Verde	27.68	
76	4	8	Billy-Scott Irakose	Burundi	28.43	
77	3	4	Leon Seaton	Guyana	28.54	
78	3	3	Izzeldin Ibrahim	Sudan	28.62	
79	2	7	Simanga Dlamini	Eswatini	28.64	
80	3	5	Jefferson Kpanou	Benin	28.72	
81	4	9	Alijon Khairulloev	Tajikistan	28.81	
82	3	0	Edgar Iro	Solomon Islands	29.40	
83	1	4	Albachir Mouctar	Niger	29.45	
84	2	6	Achala Gekabel	Ethiopia	29.59	
85	2	3	Michael Swift	Malawi	29.60	
86	2	5	Joshua Wyse	Sierra Leone	29.85	
87	3	6	Shawn Dingilius-Wallace	Palau	30.39	
88	1	5	Slava Sihanouvong	Laos	30.40	
89	3	2	Cedrick Niyibizi	Rwanda	30.92	
90	3	9	Charly Ndjoume	Cameroon	31.71	
91	3	7	Houssein Gaber	Djibouti	31.74	
92	1	2	Mohamed Ibrahim	Comoros	32.53	
93	1	6	Kinley Lhendup	Bhutan	34.21	
94	3	1	Hassan Baidar	Yemen	34.70	
	4	2	Davidson Vincent	Haiti	DNS	

=== Semifinals ===
The semifinals were held on 21 July at 20:23.

==== Semifinal 1 ====
Rank	Lane	Name	Nationality	Time	Notes
1	4	Andriy Govorov	Ukraine	22.80	Q
2	5	Szebasztián Szabó	Hungary	23.09	Q
3	1	Piero Codia	Italy	23.29	
4	3	Daniel Zaitsev	Estonia	23.31	
5	8	Konrad Czerniak	Poland	23.36	
6	6	Dylan Carter	Trinidad and Tobago	23.37	
7	2	Maxime Grousset	France	23.41	
8	7	Meiron Cheruti	Israel	23.62	

==== Semifinal 2 ====
Rank	Lane	Name	Nationality	Time	Notes
1	4	Caeleb Dressel	United States	22.57	Q, CR, AM
2	7	Nicholas Santos	Brazil	22.77	Q
3	5	Oleg Kostin	Russia	22.88	Q
4	3	Michael Andrew	United States	22.95	Q
5	2	Ben Proud	Great Britain	23.14	Q
6	6	Andrey Zhilkin	Russia	23.21	Q
7	1	Kristian Golomeev	Greece	23.29	
8	8	Abdelrahman Sameh	Egypt	23.68	

=== Final ===
The final was held on 22 July at 20:47.

Rank	Lane	Name	Nationality	Time	Notes
1st place, gold medalist(s)	4	Caeleb Dressel	United States	22.35	CR, AM
2nd place, silver medalist(s)	6	Oleg Kostin	Russia	22.70	NR
3rd place, bronze medalist(s)	5	Nicholas Santos	Brazil	22.79	
4	2	Michael Andrew	United States	22.80	
5	7	Szebasztián Szabó	Hungary	22.90	NR
6	3	Andriy Govorov	Ukraine	22.91	
7	1	Ben Proud	Great Britain	23.01	
8	8	Andrey Zhilkin	Russia	23.11	
