= Open water swimming at the 2019 World Aquatics Championships – Men's 5 km =

Men's 5 km at the 2019 World Aquatics Championships
- Venue: Yeosu Expo Ocean Park
- Location: Gwangju, South Korea
- Dates: 13 July
- Competitors: 61 from 38 nations
- Winning time: 53:22.1

Medalists
gold medal	Kristóf Rasovszky	Hungary
silver medal	Logan Fontaine	France
bronze medal	Eric Hedlin	Canada

The men's 5 km competition at the 2019 World Aquatics Championships was held on 13 July 2019.

== Race ==
The race was started at 08:00.

Results
Rank	Swimmer	Nationality	Time
1st place, gold medalist(s)	Kristóf Rasovszky	Hungary	53:22.1
2nd place, silver medalist(s)	Logan Fontaine	France	53:32.2
3rd place, bronze medalist(s)	Eric Hedlin	Canada	53:32.4
4	Matěj Kozubek	Czech Republic	53:33.6
5	Domenico Acerenza	Italy	53:34.0
6	Dániel Székelyi	Hungary	53:34.4
7	Bailey Armstrong	Australia	53:34.8
8	Kirill Abrosimov	Russia	53:35.5
9	Hayden Cotter	Australia	53:35.5
10	Guillem Pujol	Spain	53:35.8
11	Krzysztof Pielowski	Poland	53:36.9
12	Michael Brinegar	United States	53:37.1
13	Qiao Zhongyi	China	53:37.6
14	Brennan Gravley	United States	53:37.8
15	Damien Joly	France	53:40.2
16	Raben Dommann	Canada	53:40.5
17	Marcello Guidi	Italy	53:41.0
18	Niklas Frach	Germany	53:41.8
19	Yuval Safra	Israel	53:41.9
19	David Castro	Ecuador	53:41.9
21	Pepijn Smits	Netherlands	53:42.4
22	Michael McGlynn	South Africa	53:42.4
23	Sören Meißner	Germany	53:43.1
24	Daniel Delgadillo	Mexico	53:43.6
25	Denis Adeev	Russia	53:43.6
25	Fernando Ponte	Brazil	53:43.6
27	Tamás Farkas	Serbia	53:44.5
28	Rafael Gil	Portugal	53:45.7
29	Yonatan Rosin	Israel	53:45.8
30	Vít Ingeduld	Czech Republic	53:46.1
31	Vitaliy Khudyakov	Kazakhstan	53:48.3
32	David Brandl	Austria	53:50.1
33	David Farinango	Ecuador	53:50.4
34	Raúl Santiago	Spain	53:52.8
35	Wilder Carreno	Venezuela	53:53.1
36	Diogo Villarinho	Brazil	53:55.4
37	William Thorley	Hong Kong	53:56.2
38	Tiago Campos	Portugal	53:57.2
39	Mathieu Ben Rahou	Morocco	53:59.9
40	Tomáš Peciar	Slovakia	54:00.7
41	Marwan El-Amrawy	Egypt	54:00.7
42	Gordon Mason	Great Britain	54:01.0
43	Christopher McGlynn	South Africa	54:06.2
44	Rodrigo Caballero	Bolivia	54:08.0
45	Cheng Long	China	54:18.7
46	Fernando Betanzos	Mexico	56:25.1
47	Maximiliano Paccot	Uruguay	56:26.1
48	Baek Seung-ho	South Korea	57:05.3
49	Keith Sin	Hong Kong	58:21.6
50	Simon Bachmann	Seychelles	58:32.0
51	Amadou Ndiaye	Senegal	59:57.2
52	Cho Jae-hoo	South Korea	59:57.8
53	Sander Paavo	Estonia	1:00:05.8
54	Zedheir Torrez	Bolivia	1:00:36.2
55	Cristofer Lanuza	Costa Rica	1:00:38.9
56	Rinel Pius	Estonia	1:01:51.4
57	Santiago Reyes	Guatemala	1:01:51.7
58	João Duarte	Angola	1:04:05.5
59	Kenessary Kenenbayev	Kazakhstan	1:04:41.7
60	Dean Hoffman	Seychelles	1:05:33.5
	Mohamed Ibrahim	Sudan	OTL
