= Germany at the 2019 World Aquatics Championships =

- Flag of Germany
- World Aquatics code: GER
- National federation: German Swimming Federation
- Website: dsv.de (in German)

in Gwangju, South Korea
- Competitors: 36 in 5 sports
- Medals Ranked 8th: Gold 3 Silver 2 Bronze 3 Total 8

World Aquatics Championships appearances
- 1991; 1994; 1998; 2001; 2003; 2005; 2007; 2009; 2011; 2013; 2015; 2017; 2019; 2022; 2023; 2024; 2025

Other related appearances
- East Germany (1973–1986); West Germany (1973–1986)

Germany competed at the 2019 World Aquatics Championships in Gwangju, South Korea from 12 to 28 July.

== Medalists ==
| Medal | Name | Sport | Event | Date |
|---|---|---|---|---|
| Gold | Florian Wellbrock | Open water swimming | 10 km | 16 July |
| Gold | Lea Boy; Sarah Köhler; Sören Meißner; Rob Muffels | Open water swimming | Team | 18 July |
| Gold | Florian Wellbrock | Swimming | Men's 1500 metre freestyle | 28 July |
| Silver | Finnia Wunram | Open water swimming | 25 km | 19 July |
| Silver | Sarah Köhler | Swimming | Women's 1500 metre freestyle | 23 July |
| Bronze | Rob Muffels | Open water swimming | 10 km | 16 July |
| Bronze | Leonie Beck | Open water swimming | 5 km | 17 July |
| Bronze | Lou Massenberg; Tina Punzel | Diving | 3 m mixed synchro | 20 July |

== Artistic swimming ==
Germany's artistic swimming team consisted of 2 athletes (2 female).

Women

| Athlete | Event | Preliminaries | | Final | |
| Athlete | Event | Points | Rank | Points | Rank |
|---|---|---|---|---|---|
| Marlene Bojer | Solo technical routine | 78.4601 | 14 | did not advance | |
| Marlene Bojer | Solo free routine | 79.7000 | 15 | did not advance | |
| Marlene Bojer; Daniela Reinhardt | Duet technical routine | 79.8807 | 20 | did not advance | |
| Marlene Bojer; Daniela Reinhardt | Duet free routine | 79.9667 | 19 | did not advance | |

== Diving ==
Germany entered 10 divers (six male and four female).

Men

| Athlete | Event | Preliminaries | | Semifinals | | Final | |
| Athlete | Event | Points | Rank | Points | Rank | Points | Rank |
|---|---|---|---|---|---|---|---|
| Patrick Hausding | 1 m springboard | 357.20 | 9 | —N/a | | 405.05 | 5 |
| Frithjof Seidel | 1 m springboard | 277.80 | 34 | —N/a | | did not advance | |
| Patrick Hausding | 3 m springboard | 418.25 | 9 | 446.20 | 9 | 452.25 | 6 |
| Martin Wolfram | 3 m springboard | 408.55 | 14 | 403.50 | 15 | did not advance | |
| Timo Barthel | 10 m platform | 366.50 | 21 | did not advance | | | |
| Lou Massenberg | 10 m platform | 394.75 | 16 | 365.70 | 17 | did not advance | |
| Patrick Hausding; Lars Rüdiger | 3 m synchronized springboard | 376.44 | 6 | —N/a | | 399.87 | 4 |
| Timo Barthel; Lou Massenberg | 10 m synchronized platform | 378.96 | 6 | —N/a | | 368.25 | 10 |

Women

| Athlete | Event | Preliminaries | | Semifinals | | Final | |
| Athlete | Event | Points | Rank | Points | Rank | Points | Rank |
|---|---|---|---|---|---|---|---|
| Lena Hentschel | 1 m springboard | 214.10 | 21 | —N/a | | did not advance | |
| Lena Hentschel | 3 m springboard | 238.10 | 32 | did not advance | | | |
| Tina Punzel | 3 m springboard | 293.05 | 7 | 309.40 | 5 | 281.00 | 10 |
| Christina Wassen | 10 m platform | 298.80 | 14 | 298.90 | 14 | did not advance | |
| Maria Kurjo | 10 m platform | 285.45 | 16 | 295.55 | 16 | did not advance | |
| Lena Hentschel; Tina Punzel | 3 m synchronized springboard | 253.59 | 13 | —N/a | | did not advance | |
| Tina Punzel; Christina Wassen | 10 m synchronized platform | 264.48 | 10 | —N/a | | 258.40 | 12 |

Mixed

| Athlete | Event | Final | |
| Athlete | Event | Points | Rank |
|---|---|---|---|
| Lou Massenberg; Tina Punzel | 3 m mixed synchronized springboard | 301.62 | 3rd place, bronze medalist(s) |
| Maria Kurjo; Lars Rüdiger | Team | 324.50 | 8 |

== High diving ==
Germany qualified one male and one female high diver, but opted not to enter the male diver.

Women

| Athlete | Event | Points | Rank |
|---|---|---|---|
| Iris Schmidbauer | Women's high diving | 233.55 | 8 |

== Open water swimming ==
Germany qualified five male and four female open water swimmers.

Men

| Athlete | Event | Time | Rank |
|---|---|---|---|
| Niklas Frach | Men's 5 km | 53:41.8 | 18 |
| Sören Meißner | Men's 5 km | 53:43.1 | 23 |
| Sören Meißner | Men's 25 km | 4:52:52.9 | 9 |
| Rob Muffels | Men's 10 km | 1:47:57.4 | 3rd place, bronze medalist(s) |
| Andreas Waschburger | Men's 25 km | 4:52:26.3 | 8 |
| Florian Wellbrock | Men's 10 km | 1:47:55.9 | 1st place, gold medalist(s) |

Women

| Athlete | Event | Time | Rank |
|---|---|---|---|
| Leonie Beck | Women's 5 km | 57:58.0 | 3rd place, bronze medalist(s) |
| Leonie Beck | Women's 10 km | 1:54:51.0 | 9 |
| Lea Boy | Women's 25 km | 5:12:40.6 | 12 |
| Finnia Wunram | Women's 5 km | 58:12.0 | 15 |
| Finnia Wunram | Women's 10 km | 1:54:50.7 | 8 |
| Finnia Wunram | Women's 25 km | 5:08:11.6 | 2nd place, silver medalist(s) |

Team

| Athletes | Event | Time | Rank |
|---|---|---|---|
| Lea Boy; Sarah Köhler; Sören Meißner; Rob Muffels | Team | 53:58.7 | 1st place, gold medalist(s) |

== Swimming ==
German swimmers have achieved qualifying standards in the following events (up to a maximum of 2 swimmers in each event at the A-standard entry time, and 1 at the B-standard)

Men

| Athlete | Event | Heat | | Semifinal | | Final | |
| Athlete | Event | Time | Rank | Time | Rank | Time | Rank |
|---|---|---|---|---|---|---|---|
| Christian Diener | 100 m backstroke | 54.68 | 26 | did not advance | | | |
| Christian Diener | 200 m backstroke | 1:57.61 | 8 Q | 1:57.33 | 9 | did not advance | |
| Jacob Heidtmann | 200 m freestyle | 1:47.38 | 18 | did not advance | | | |
| Philip Heintz | 200 m individual medley | 1:58.71 | 6 Q | 1:56.95 | 2 Q | 1:56.78 | 4 |
| Philip Heintz | 400 m individual medley | 4:15.24 | 8 Q | —N/a | | Withdrawn | |
| Marco Koch | 200 m breaststroke | 2:08.70 | 3 Q | 2:08.28 | 8 Q | 2:07.60 | 5 |
| Marius Kusch | 100 m freestyle | 49.31 | 28 | did not advance | | | |
| Marius Kusch | 50 m butterfly | 23.86 | 25 | did not advance | | | |
| Marius Kusch | 100 m butterfly | 52.05 | 10 Q | 51.50 | 5 Q | 51.66 | 8 |
| Maximilian Pilger | 200 m breaststroke | 2:11.35 | 23 | did not advance | | | |
| Fabian Schwingenschlögl | 100 m breaststroke | 1:00.12 | 20 | did not advance | | | |
| Ruwen Straub | 1500 m freestyle | 15:05.51 | 17 | —N/a | | did not advance | |
| David Thomasberger | 200 m butterfly | 1:57.31 | 20 | did not advance | | | |
| Florian Wellbrock | 800 m freestyle | 7:53.75 | 17 | —N/a | | did not advance | |
| Florian Wellbrock | 1500 m freestyle | 14:47.52 | 2 Q | —N/a | | 14:36.54 | 1st place, gold medalist(s) |
| Poul Zellmann | 200 m freestyle | 1:47.65 | 21 | did not advance | | | |
| Damian Wierling; Marius Kusch; Josha Salchow; Christoph Fildebrandt | 4 × 100 m freestyle relay | 3:14.58 | 11 | —N/a | | did not advance | |
| Poul Zellmann; Rafael Miroslaw; Jacob Heidtmann; Damian Wierling | 4 × 200 m freestyle relay | 7:08.45 | 7 Q | —N/a | | 7:07.65 | 8 |
| Christian Diener; Fabian Schwingenschlögl; Marius Kusch; Damian Wierling | 4 × 100 m medley relay | 3:34.02 | 8 Q | —N/a | | 3:32.86 | 8 |

Women

| Athlete | Event | Heat | | Semifinal | | Final | |
| Athlete | Event | Time | Rank | Time | Rank | Time | Rank |
|---|---|---|---|---|---|---|---|
| Anna Elendt | 50 m breaststroke | 31.24 | 15 Q | 31.10 | 8 Q | 31.06 | 7 |
| Anna Elendt | 100 m breaststroke | 1:08.70 | 24 | did not advance | | | |
| Franziska Hentke | 200 m butterfly | 2:08.69 | 6 Q | 2:08.14 | 5 Q | 2:07.30 | 4 |
| Angelina Köhler | 50 m butterfly | 26.65 | 22 | did not advance | | | |
| Angelina Köhler | 100 m butterfly | 57.92 | 11 Q | 57.93 | 13 | did not advance | |
| Sarah Köhler | 800 m freestyle | 8:22.95 | 6 Q | —N/a | | 8:16.43 NR | 4 |
| Sarah Köhler | 1500 m freestyle | 15:54.08 | 3 Q | —N/a | | 15:48.89 NR | 2nd place, silver medalist(s) |
| Laura Riedemann | 100 m backstroke | 1:00.12 | 11 Q | 59.82 | 10 | did not advance | |
| Annika Bruhn; Reva Foos; Julia Mrozinski; Jessica Steiger | 4 × 100 m freestyle relay | 3:38.55 | 8 Q | —N/a | | 3:39.07 | 8 |
| Reva Foos; Isabel Gose; Marie Pietruschka; Annika Bruhn | 4 × 200 m freestyle relay | 7:54.30 | 5 Q | —N/a | | 7:55.63 | 7 |
| Laura Riedemann; Anna Elendt; Angelina Köhler; Jessica Steiger | 4 × 100 m medley relay | 4:00.91 | 9 | —N/a | | did not advance | |

Mixed

| Athlete | Event | Heat | | Semifinal | | Final | |
| Athlete | Event | Time | Rank | Time | Rank | Time | Rank |
|---|---|---|---|---|---|---|---|
| Josha Salchow; Christoph Fildebrandt; Isabel Gose; Julia Mrozinski | 4 × 100 m mixed freestyle relay | 3:27.37 | 9 | —N/a | | did not advance | |
| Laura Riedemann; Fabian Schwingenschlögl; Marius Kusch; Jessica Steiger | 4 × 100 m mixed medley relay | 3:45.20 | 8 Q | —N/a | | 3:45.07 | 7 |

== Water polo ==
=== Men's tournament ===
Team roster

- Moritz Schenkel
- Ben Reibel
- Timo van der Bosch
- Julian Real (C)
- Tobias Preuss
- Maurice Jüngling
- Denis Strelezkij
- Luuk Gielen
- Marko Stamm
- Mateo Čuk
- Marin Restović
- Dennis Eidner
- Kevin Götz
- Coach: Hagen Stamm

Group D

| Pos | Team | Pld | W | D | L | GF | GA | GD | Pts | Qualification |
|---|---|---|---|---|---|---|---|---|---|---|
| 1 | Italy | 3 | 3 | 0 | 0 | 31 | 19 | +12 | 6 | Quarterfinals |
| 2 | Germany | 3 | 1 | 1 | 1 | 31 | 25 | +6 | 3 | Playoffs |
| 3 | Japan | 3 | 1 | 1 | 1 | 27 | 27 | 0 | 3 | Playoffs |
| 4 | Brazil | 3 | 0 | 0 | 3 | 22 | 40 | −18 | 0 | Eliminated |

Source: Sportresult
Rules for classification: 1) points; 2) head-to-head points; 3) head-to-head goal difference; 4) head-to-head number of goals scored; 5) Goal difference.

| 15 July 2019; 20:30 | Report | Germany | 9–9 | Japan | Nambu University Aquatics Center, Gwangju; Referees: Michael Goldenberg (USA), Daniel Flahive (AUS) |
| 15 July 2019; 20:30 | Report | Score by quarters: 3–2, 4–3, 1–3, 1–1 | | | Nambu University Aquatics Center, Gwangju; Referees: Michael Goldenberg (USA), Daniel Flahive (AUS) |
| 15 July 2019; 20:30 | Report | Stamm 3 | Goals | Arai 3 | Nambu University Aquatics Center, Gwangju; Referees: Michael Goldenberg (USA), Daniel Flahive (AUS) |

| 17 July 2019; 17:50 | Report | Brazil | 8–15 | Germany | Nambu University Aquatics Center, Gwangju; Referees: Nenad Peris (CRO), Arkadiy Voevodin (RUS) |
| 17 July 2019; 17:50 | Report | Score by quarters: 1–4, 1–6, 2–2, 4–3 | | | Nambu University Aquatics Center, Gwangju; Referees: Nenad Peris (CRO), Arkadiy Voevodin (RUS) |
| 17 July 2019; 17:50 | Report | Coutinho 3 | Goals | Stamm 5 | Nambu University Aquatics Center, Gwangju; Referees: Nenad Peris (CRO), Arkadiy Voevodin (RUS) |

| 19 July 2019; 12:30 | Report | Germany | 7–8 | Italy | Nambu University Aquatics Center, Gwangju; Referees: Stanko Ivanovski (MNE), Daniel Flahive (AUS) |
| 19 July 2019; 12:30 | Report | Score by quarters: 2–1, 2–3, 3–2, 0–2 | | | Nambu University Aquatics Center, Gwangju; Referees: Stanko Ivanovski (MNE), Daniel Flahive (AUS) |
| 19 July 2019; 12:30 | Report | Eidner 3 | Goals | Aicardi, de Fulvio 2 | Nambu University Aquatics Center, Gwangju; Referees: Stanko Ivanovski (MNE), Daniel Flahive (AUS) |

Playoffs

| 21 July 2019; 18:30 | Report | South Africa | 5–25 | Germany | Nambu University Aquatics Center, Gwangju; Referees: Jaume Teixidó (ESP), Juan Menéndez (CUB) |
| 21 July 2019; 18:30 | Report | Score by quarters: 2–5, 0–6, 1–9, 2–5 | | | Nambu University Aquatics Center, Gwangju; Referees: Jaume Teixidó (ESP), Juan Menéndez (CUB) |
| 21 July 2019; 18:30 | Report | five players 1 | Goals | Gielen 6 | Nambu University Aquatics Center, Gwangju; Referees: Jaume Teixidó (ESP), Juan Menéndez (CUB) |

Quarterfinals

| 23 July 2019; 15:30 | Report | Croatia | 10–8 | Germany | Nambu University Aquatics Center, Gwangju; Referees: Michael Goldenberg (USA), Stanko Ivanovski (MNE) |
| 23 July 2019; 15:30 | Report | Score by quarters: 1–2, 3–1, 3–3, 3–2 | | | Nambu University Aquatics Center, Gwangju; Referees: Michael Goldenberg (USA), Stanko Ivanovski (MNE) |
| 23 July 2019; 15:30 | Report | Joković 3 | Goals | Gielen 3 | Nambu University Aquatics Center, Gwangju; Referees: Michael Goldenberg (USA), Stanko Ivanovski (MNE) |

5th–8th place semifinal

| 25 July 2019; 14:00 | Report | Serbia | 17–16 (PSO) | Germany | Nambu University Aquatics Center, Gwangju; Referees: Dion Willis (RSA), Sebastien Dervieux (FRA) |
| 25 July 2019; 14:00 | Report | Score by quarters: 3–3, 3–3, 2–3, 4–3 PSO: 5–4 | | | Nambu University Aquatics Center, Gwangju; Referees: Dion Willis (RSA), Sebastien Dervieux (FRA) |
| 25 July 2019; 14:00 | Report | Mandić 5 | Goals | three players 2 | Nambu University Aquatics Center, Gwangju; Referees: Dion Willis (RSA), Sebastien Dervieux (FRA) |

Seventh place match

| 27 July 2019; 14:00 | Report | Germany | 6–11 | Greece | Nambu University Aquatics Center, Gwangju; Referees: Stanko Ivanovski (MNE), Nenad Periš (CRO) |
| 27 July 2019; 14:00 | Report | Score by quarters: 2–1, 2–3, 0–2, 2–5 | | | Nambu University Aquatics Center, Gwangju; Referees: Stanko Ivanovski (MNE), Nenad Periš (CRO) |
| 27 July 2019; 14:00 | Report | Stamm 2 | Goals | Dervisis 3 | Nambu University Aquatics Center, Gwangju; Referees: Stanko Ivanovski (MNE), Nenad Periš (CRO) |
