= Swimming at the 2019 World Aquatics Championships – Men's 4 × 100 metre medley relay =

2019 swimming competition

Men's 4 × 100 metre medley relay at the 2019 World Aquatics Championships
- Venue: Nambu University Municipal Aquatics Center
- Location: Gwangju, South Korea
- Dates: 28 July (heats and final)
- Competitors: 120 from 27 nations
- Teams: 27
- Winning time: 3:28.10

Medalists
gold medal	Luke Greenbank; Adam Peaty; James Guy; Duncan Scott; James Wilby	Great Britain
silver medal	Ryan Murphy; Andrew Wilson; Caeleb Dressel; Nathan Adrian; Matt Grevers; Michael Andrew; Jack Conger; Zach Apple	United States
bronze medal	Evgeny Rylov; Kirill Prigoda; Andrey Minakov; Vladimir Morozov; Kliment Kolesnikov; Anton Chupkov; Mikhail Vekovishchev; Vladislav Grinev	Russia

The Men's 4 × 100 metre medley relay competition at the 2019 World Championships was held on 28 July 2019. The final was won by the British team in a European record time of three minutes, 28.10 seconds.

== Records ==
Prior to the competition, the existing world and championship records were as follows.

World record	United States	3:27.28	Rome, Italy	2 August 2009
Competition record	United States	3:27.28	Rome, Italy	2 August 2009

== Results ==
=== Heats ===
The heats were held on 28 July at 10:50.

Rank	Heat	Lane	Nation	Swimmers	Time	Notes
1	2	3	Russia	Kliment Kolesnikov (53.75); Anton Chupkov (58.90); Mikhail Vekovishchev (50.87); Vladislav Grinev (47.20)	3:30.72	Q
2	3	5	United States	Matt Grevers (52.89); Michael Andrew (59.75); Jack Conger (51.70); Zach Apple (47.59)	3:31.93	Q
3	2	4	Japan	Ryosuke Irie (53.83); Yasuhiro Koseki (58.66); Naoki Mizunuma (51.76); Katsumi Nakamura (48.09)	3:32.34	Q
4	3	3	Great Britain	Luke Greenbank (54.11); James Wilby (59.02); James Guy (51.41); Duncan Scott (47.81)	3:32.35	Q
5	2	5	Australia	Mitch Larkin (53.47); Matthew Wilson (59.16); Matthew Temple (51.27); Clyde Lewis (48.60)	3:32.50	Q
6	3	6	Brazil	Guilherme Guido (53.35); João Gomes Júnior (59.68); Vinicius Lanza (51.66); Breno Correia (47.89)	3:32.58	Q
7	3	4	China	Xu Jiayu (53.06); Yan Zibei (58.67); Li Zhuhao (52.19); He Junyi (49.50)	3:33.42	Q
8	3	2	Germany	Christian Diener (54.56); Fabian Schwingenschlögl (59.67); Marius Kusch (51.48); Damian Wierling (48.31)	3:34.02	Q
9	3	1	Belarus	Mikita Tsmyh (54.98); Ilya Shymanovich (58.30); Yauhen Tsurkin (52.46); Artsiom Machekin (48.82)	3:34.56	
10	3	7	Canada	Markus Thormeyer (54.36); Richard Funk (1:00.23); Joshua Liendo (52.09); Yuri Kisil (48.11)	3:34.79	
11	2	2	Lithuania	Danas Rapšys (54.66); Andrius Šidlauskas (59.51); Deividas Margevičius (52.53); Simonas Bilis (48.18)	3:34.88	
12	2	7	Hungary	Richárd Bohus (54.16); Dávid Horváth (1:01.99); Sebastian Sabo (51.00); Nándor Németh (47.96)	3:35.11	
13	2	6	Italy	Simone Sabbioni (54.82); Nicolò Martinenghi (59.48); Federico Burdisso (52.10); Manuel Frigo (48.83)	3:35.23	
14	1	8	Ireland	Shane Ryan (54.39); Darragh Greene (59.08); Brendan Hyland (53.11); Jordan Sloan (49.28)	3:35.86	NR
15	3	8	Netherlands	Nyls Korstanje (56.11); Arno Kamminga (59.28); Mathys Goosen (52.60); Jesse Puts (48.78)	3:36.77	
16	1	4	Turkey	Metin Aydın (55.72); Berkay Öğretir (59.74); Ümitcan Güreş (52.52); Hüseyin Emre Sakçı (48.87)	3:36.85	NR
17	2	0	South Korea	Lee Ju-ho (54.62); Moon Jae-kwon (1:00.78); Yun Seok-hwan (52.61); Yang Jae-hoon (48.96)	3:36.97	NR
18	3	9	Switzerland	Roman Mityukov (54.62) NR; Yannick Käser (1:00.59); Jérémy Desplanches (52.35); Nils Liess (49.42)	3:36.98	NR
19	1	3	Croatia	Anton Lončar (55.52); Nikola Obrovac (1:00.01); Nikola Miljenić (52.93); Bruno Blašković (48.72)	3:37.18	
20	1	5	Israel	Yakov Toumarkin (54.36); Itay Goldfaden (1:01.09); Tomer Frankel (52.76); Meiron Cheruti (49.30)	3:37.51	
21	2	9	Poland	Radosław Kawęcki (55.10); Jan Kałusowski (1:02.17); Konrad Czerniak (52.01); Kacper Majchrzak (48.81)	3:38.09	
22	2	8	Kazakhstan	Adil Kaskabay (56.83); Dmitriy Balandin (58.52); Adilbek Mussin (52.71); Alexandr Varakin (50.07)	3:38.13	
23	2	1	South Africa	Christopher Reid (55.06); Michael Houlie (1:01.16); Chad le Clos (50.94); Ryan Coetzee (51.02)	3:38.18	
24	1	2	Egypt	Mohamed Samy (55.23); Youssef El-Kamash (1:00.97); Abdelrahman Sameh (53.99); Ali Khalafalla (48.84)	3:39.03	NR
25	1	6	Chinese Taipei	Chuang Mu-lun (55.89); Chen Chih-ming (1:01.67); Chu Chen-ping (53.41); Wang Yu-lian (49.89)	3:40.86	NR
26	3	0	Singapore	Quah Zheng Wen (55.34); Lionel Khoo (1:02.44); Jonathan Tan Eu Jin (54.13); Darren Chua Yi Shou (49.67)	3:41.58	
27	1	7	Hong Kong	Cheuk Yin Ng (58.48); Michael Ng Yu Hin (1:04.80); Nicholas Lim (54.95); Ian Ho Yentou (49.78)	3:48.01	
	1	1	Malaysia		DNS	

=== Final ===
The final was held on 28 July at 21:38.

Rank	Lane	Nation	Swimmers	Time	Notes
1st place, gold medalist(s)	6	Great Britain	Luke Greenbank (53.95); Adam Peaty (57.20); James Guy (50.81); Duncan Scott (46.14)	3:28.10	ER
2nd place, silver medalist(s)	5	United States	Ryan Murphy (52.92); Andrew Wilson (58.65); Caeleb Dressel (49.28); Nathan Adrian (47.60)	3:28.45	
3rd place, bronze medalist(s)	4	Russia	Evgeny Rylov (52.57); Kirill Prigoda (58.68); Andrey Minakov (50.54); Vladimir Morozov (47.02)	3:28.81	NR
4	3	Japan	Ryosuke Irie (53.54); Yasuhiro Koseki (58.16); Naoki Mizunuma (51.16); Katsumi Nakamura (47.49)	3:30.35	
5	2	Australia	Mitch Larkin (53.16); Matthew Wilson (59.67); Matthew Temple (50.99); Kyle Chalmers (46.60)	3:30.42	
6	7	Brazil	Guilherme Guido (53.20); João Gomes Júnior (58.80); Vinicius Lanza (51.29); Marcelo Chierighini (47.57)	3:30.86	
7	1	China	Xu Jiayu (52.97); Yan Zibei (58.26); Li Zhuhao (51.72); Cao Jiwen (48.66)	3:31.61	
8	8	Germany	Christian Diener (54.83); Fabian Schwingenschlögl (59.26); Marius Kusch (50.79); Damian Wierling (47.98)	3:32.86	
