= Ecuador at the 2019 World Aquatics Championships =

- Flag of Ecuador
- FINA code: ECU
- National federation: Ecuadorian Swimming Federation
- Website: fena-ecuador.org (in Spanish)

in Gwangju, South Korea
- Competitors: 8 in 2 sports
- Medals: Gold 0 Silver 0 Bronze 0 Total 0

World Aquatics Championships appearances
- 1973; 1975; 1978; 1982; 1986; 1991; 1994; 1998; 2001; 2003; 2005; 2007; 2009; 2011; 2013; 2015; 2017; 2019; 2022; 2023; 2024

Ecuador competed at the 2019 World Aquatics Championships in Gwangju, South Korea from 12 to 28 July.

== Open water swimming ==
Ecuador qualified three male and three female open water swimmers.

Men

Athlete	Event	Time	Rank
David Castro	Men's 5 km	53:41.9	=19
David Castro	Men's 10 km	1:50:14.4	31
Esteban Enderica	Men's 10 km	1:48:07.3	11
David Farinango	Men's 5 km	53:50.4	33

Women

Athlete	Event	Time	Rank
Ana Abad	Women's 5 km	1:07:09.3	51
Samantha Arévalo	Women's 10 km	1:55:22.8	18
Samantha Arévalo	Women's 25 km	5:12:22.1	10
Nataly Caldas	Women's 5 km	1:01:41.9	41
Nataly Caldas	Women's 10 km	2:02:03.5	44

Mixed

Athlete	Event	Time	Rank
David Farinango; Nataly Caldas; Ana Abad; David Castro	Team	59:37.9	20

== Swimming ==
Ecuador entered two swimmers.

Men

Athlete	Event	Heat		Semifinal		Final	
Athlete	Event	Time	Rank	Time	Rank	Time	Rank
Tomas Peribonio	200 m individual medley	2:00.07	19	did not advance			
Tomas Peribonio	400 m individual medley	4:17.83	17	—		did not advance	

Women

Athlete	Event	Heat		Semifinal		Final	
Athlete	Event	Time	Rank	Time	Rank	Time	Rank
Anicka Delgado	100 m freestyle	56.67	41	did not advance			
Anicka Delgado	50 m butterfly	27.48	=34	did not advance			
