= Russia at the 2019 World Aquatics Championships =

- World Aquatics code: RUS
- National federation: All Russian Swimming Federation
- Website: russwimming.ru (in Russian)

in Gwangju, South Korea
- Competitors: 91 in 6 sports
- Medals Ranked 3rd: Gold 12 Silver 11 Bronze 7 Total 30

World Aquatics Championships appearances
- 1994; 1998; 2001; 2003; 2005; 2007; 2009; 2011; 2013; 2015; 2017; 2019; 2022–2025

Other related appearances
- Soviet Union (1973–1991)

Russia competed at the 2019 World Aquatics Championships in Gwangju, South Korea from 12 to 28 July.

== Medalists ==
Medal	Name	Sport	Event	Date
Gold	Svetlana Kolesnichenko	Artistic swimming	Solo technical routine	13 July
Gold	Svetlana Kolesnichenko; Svetlana Romashina	Artistic swimming	Duet technical routine	14 July
Gold	Mayya Gurbanberdieva; Aleksandr Maltsev	Artistic swimming	Mixed duet technical routine	15 July
Gold	Anastasia Arkhipovskaya; Vlada Chigireva; Mayya Doroshko; Marina Goliadkina; Veronika Kalinina; Polina Komar; Alla Shishkina; Maria Shurochkina	Artistic swimming	Team technical routine	16 July
Gold	Svetlana Romashina	Artistic swimming	Solo free routine	17 July
Gold	Svetlana Kolesnichenko; Svetlana Romashina	Artistic swimming	Duet free routine	18 July
Gold	Anastasia Arkhipovskaya; Vlada Chigireva; Marina Goliadkina; Veronika Kalinina; Polina Komar; Alla Shishkina; Maria Shurochkina; Varvara Subbotina	Artistic swimming	Team free routine	19 July
Gold	Mayya Gurbanberdieva; Aleksandr Maltsev	Artistic swimming	Mixed duet free routine	20 July
Gold	Anastasia Arkhipovskaya; Vlada Chigireva; Mayya Doroshko; Marina Goliadkina; Mikhaela Kalancha; Veronika Kalinina; Polina Komar; Alla Shishkina; Maria Shurochkina; Varvara Subbotina	Artistic swimming	Free routine combination	20 July
Gold	Yuliya Yefimova	Swimming	Women's 200 m breaststroke	26 July
Gold	Evgeny Rylov	Swimming	Men's 200 m backstroke	26 July
Gold	Anton Chupkov	Swimming	Men's 200 m breaststroke	26 July
Silver	Viktor Minibaev; Ekaterina Beliaeva	Diving	Mixed synchronized 10 m platform	13 July
Silver	Aleksandr Bondar; Viktor Minibaev	Diving	Men's synchronized 10 m platform	15 July
Silver	Sergey Nazin; Yulia Timoshinina	Diving	Team event	16 July
Silver	Kirill Belyaev	Open water swimming	Men's 25 km	19 July
Silver	Vladislav Grinev; Kliment Kolesnikov; Andrei Minakov*; Vladimir Morozov; Evgeny Rylov	Swimming	Men's 4 x 100 m freestyle relay	21 July
Silver	Oleg Kostin	Swimming	Men's 50 m butterfly	22 July
Silver	Evgeny Rylov	Swimming	Men's 100 m backstroke	23 July
Silver	Yuliya Efimova	Swimming	Women's 100 m breaststroke	23 July
Silver	Mikhail Dovgalyuk; Ivan Girev*; Aleksandr Krasnykh; Martin Malyutin; Mikhail Vekovishchev	Swimming	Men's 4 x 200 m freestyle relay	26 July
Silver	Andrey Minakov	Swimming	Men's 100 m butterfly	27 July
Silver	Evgeny Rylov	Swimming	Men's 50 m backstroke	28 July
Bronze	Aleksandr Bondar	Diving	Men's 10 m platform	20 July
Bronze	Martin Malyutin	Swimming	Men's 200 m freestyle	23 July
Bronze	Vladislav Grinev	Swimming	Men's 100 m freestyle	25 July
Bronze	Daria Vaskina	Swimming	Women's 50 m backstroke	25 July
Bronze	Kliment Kolesnikov	Swimming	Men's 50 m backstroke	28 July
Bronze	Yuliya Yefimova	Swimming	Women's 50 m breaststroke	28 July
Bronze	Anton Chupkov; Vladislav Grinev; Kliment Kolesnikov; Andrey Minakov; Vladimir Morozov; Kirill Prigoda; Evgeny Rylov; Mikhail Vekovishchev	Swimming	Men's 4 × 100 m medley relay	28 July

== Artistic swimming ==
Russia's artistic swimming team consisted of 14 athletes (1 male and 13 female).

Women

Athlete	Event	Preliminaries		Final	
Athlete	Event	Points	Rank	Points	Rank
Svetlana Kolesnichenko	Solo technical routine	94.1126	1 Q	95.0023	1st place, gold medalist(s)
Svetlana Romashina	Solo free routine	96.4667	1 Q	97.1333	1st place, gold medalist(s)
Svetlana Kolesnichenko; Svetlana Romashina	Duet technical routine	95.9501	1 Q	95.9010	1st place, gold medalist(s)
Svetlana Kolesnichenko; Svetlana Romashina	Duet free routine	96.6667	1 Q	97.5000	1st place, gold medalist(s)
Anastasia Arkhipovskaya; Vlada Chigireva; Mayya Doroshko; Marina Goliadkina; Veronika Kalinina; Polina Komar; Alla Shishkina; Maria Shurochkina	Team technical routine	96.2253	1 Q	96.9426	1st place, gold medalist(s)
Anastasia Arkhipovskaya; Vlada Chigireva; Marina Goliadkina; Veronika Kalinina; Polina Komar; Alla Shishkina; Maria Shurochkina; Varvara Subbotina	Team free routine	97.7667	1 Q	98.0000	1st place, gold medalist(s)
Anastasia Arkhipovskaya; Vlada Chigireva; Mayya Doroshko; Marina Goliadkina; Mikhaela Kalancha; Veronika Kalinina; Polina Komar; Alla Shishkina; Maria Shurochkina; Varvara Subbotina	Free routine combination	96.5667	1 Q	98.0000	1st place, gold medalist(s)

Mixed

Athlete	Event	Preliminaries		Final	
Athlete	Event	Points	Rank	Points	Rank
Mayya Gurbanberdieva; Aleksandr Maltsev	Duet technical routine	91.5878	1 Q	92.0749	1st place, gold medalist(s)
Mayya Gurbanberdieva; Aleksandr Maltsev	Duet free routine	93.1000	1 Q	92.9667	1st place, gold medalist(s)

== Diving ==
Russia has entered 13 divers (6 male and 7 female).

Men

Athlete	Event	Preliminaries		Semifinals		Final	
Athlete	Event	Points	Rank	Points	Rank	Points	Rank
Sergey Nazin	1 m springboard	303.45	29	—N/a		Did not advance	
Evgeny Kuznetsov	3 m springboard	416.10	12 Q	447.55	8 Q	434.55	10
Nikita Shleikher	3 m springboard	436.30	5 Q	452.15	5 Q	442.95	9
Aleksandr Bondar	10 m platform	483.55	5 Q	426.60	10 Q	541.05	3rd place, bronze medalist(s)
Igor Mialin	10 m platform	398.50	13 Q	403.60	14	Did not advance	
Evgeny Kuznetsov; Nikita Shleikher	3 m synchronized springboard	345.00	12 Q	—N/a		396.81	5
Aleksandr Bondar; Viktor Minibaev	10 m synchronized platform	407.37	3 Q	—N/a		444.60	2nd place, silver medalist(s)

Women

Athlete	Event	Preliminaries		Semifinals		Final	
Athlete	Event	Points	Rank	Points	Rank	Points	Rank
Kristina Ilinykh	1 m springboard	245.50	3 Q	—N/a		252.80	5
Maria Polyakova	1 m springboard	212.25	23	—N/a		Did not advance	
Elena Chernykh	3 m springboard	266.70	17 Q	264.45	18	Did not advance	
Uliana Kliueva	3 m springboard	251.70	22	Did not advance			
Anna Chuinyshena	10 m platform	235.30	30	Did not advance			
Yulia Timoshinina	10 m platform	233.25	31	Did not advance			
Kristina Ilinykh; Maria Polyakova	3 m synchronized springboard	267.90	7 Q	—N/a		292.80	4
Ekaterina Beliaeva; Yulia Timoshinina	10 m synchronized platform	288.00	5 Q	—N/a		291.30	5

Mixed

Athlete	Event	Final	
Athlete	Event	Points	Rank
Sergey Nazin; Kristina Ilinykh	3 m synchronized springboard	273.24	10
Viktor Minibaev; Ekaterina Beliaeva	10 m synchronized platform	311.28	2nd place, silver medalist(s)
Sergey Nazin; Yulia Timoshinina	Team	390.05	2nd place, silver medalist(s)

== High diving ==
Russia qualified three male high divers.

Athlete	Event	Points	Rank
Nikita Fedotov	Men's high diving	327.75	12
Igor Semashko	Men's high diving	184.50	22
Artem Silchenko	Men's high diving	230.45	17

== Open water swimming ==
Russia qualified four male and five female open water swimmers.

Men

Athlete	Event	Time	Rank
Kirill Abrosimov	Men's 5 km	53:35.5	8
Kirill Abrosimov	Men's 10 km	1:48:55.9	19
Denis Adeev	Men's 5 km	53:43.6	25
Kirill Belyaev	Men's 25 km	4:51:06.5	2nd place, silver medalist(s)
Evgeny Drattsev	Men's 10 km	1:49:37.4	22
Evgeny Drattsev	Men's 25 km	4:51:19.6	6

Women

Athlete	Event	Time	Rank
Anastasia Basalduk	Women's 25 km	Did not finish	
Valeriia Ermakova	Women's 5 km	58:17.5	22
Sofia Kolesnikova	Women's 25 km	5:12:30.0	11
Anastasiya Krapyvina	Women's 10 km	1:55:24.9	20
Mariia Novikova	Women's 5 km	58:17.3	20
Mariia Novikova	Women's 10 km	1:55:26.0	21

Mixed

Athlete	Event	Time	Rank
Kirill Abrosimov; Denis Adeev; Anastasia Basalduk; Valeriia Ermakova	Team	55:19.1	10

== Swimming ==
Men

Athlete	Event	Heat		Semifinal		Final	
Athlete	Event	Time	Rank	Time	Rank	Time	Rank
Anton Chupkov	100 m breaststroke	59.31	9 Q	59.15	7 Q	59.19	8
Anton Chupkov	200 m breaststroke	2:08.22	2 Q	2:06.83	2 Q	2:06.12	1st place, gold medalist(s)
Mikhail Dovgalyuk	200 m freestyle	1:46.72	11 Q	1:46.20	12	Did not advance	
Ilya Druzhinin	800 m freestyle	7:54.07	18	—N/a		Did not advance	
Ilya Druzhinin	1500 m freestyle	15:07.93	18	—N/a		Did not advance	
Vladislav Grinev	50 m freestyle	22.52	31	Did not advance			
Vladislav Grinev	100 m freestyle	47.92	2 Q	47.82	4	47.82	3rd place, bronze medalist(s)
Kliment Kolesnikov	50 m backstroke	24.61	1 Q	24.35	1 Q	24.51	3rd place, bronze medalist(s)
Kliment Kolesnikov	100 m backstroke	53.89	14 Q	53.44	9	Did not advance	
Oleg Kostin	50 m butterfly	23.01	3 Q	22.88	4 Q	22.70	2nd place, silver medalist(s)
Alexander Krasnykh	400 m freestyle	3:46.65	9	—N/a		Did not advance	
Martin Malyutin	200 m freestyle	1:46.29	3 Q	1:45.60	7	1:45.63	3rd place, bronze medalist(s)
Martin Malyutin	400 m freestyle	3:47.43	11	—N/a		Did not advance	
Andrei Minakov	100 m butterfly	51.54	3 Q	50.94	2 Q	50.83	2nd place, silver medalist(s)
Vladimir Morozov	50 m freestyle	21.70	3 Q	21.65	5	21.53	4
Vladimir Morozov	100 m freestyle	49.09	24	Did not advance			
Andrei Nikolaev	50 m breaststroke	26.99	9 Q	27.17	=11	Did not advance	
Aleksandr Palatov	200 m breaststroke	2:12.06	26	Did not advance			
Kirill Prigoda	50 m breaststroke	26.93	6 Q	27.08	=8 so	26.72	4
Kirill Prigoda	100 m breaststroke	59.32	10 Q	59.21	8 Q	59.09	5
Evgeny Rylov	50 m backstroke	25.16	15 Q	24.56	3 Q	24.49	2nd place, silver medalist(s)
Evgeny Rylov	100 m backstroke	53.45	6 Q	52.44	=2 Q	52.67	2nd place, silver medalist(s)
Evgeny Rylov	200 m backstroke	1:56.76	2 Q	1:55.48	1 Q	1:53.40	1st place, gold medalist(s)
Grigory Tarasevich	200 m backstroke	1:57.99	13 Q	1:57.72	12	Did not advance	
Andrey Zhilkin	50 m butterfly	23.27	7 Q	23.21	8 Q	23.11	8
Andrey Zhilkin	200 m individual medley	1:58.73	7 Q	1:58.16	9	Did not advance	
Vladislav Grinev; Kliment Kolesnikov; Andrei Minakov*; Vladimir Morozov; Evgeny Rylov	4×100 m freestyle relay	3:12.64	3 Q	—N/a		3:09.97	2nd place, silver medalist(s)
Mikhail Dovgalyuk; Ivan Girev*; Aleksandr Krasnykh; Martin Malyutin; Mikhail Vekovishchev	4×200 m freestyle relay	7:05.28	2 Q	—N/a		7:01.81	2nd place, silver medalist(s)
Anton Chupkov*; Vladislav Grinev*; Kliment Kolesnikov*; Andrey Minakov; Vladimir Morozov; Kirill Prigoda; Evgeny Rylov; Mikhail Vekovishchev*	4×100 m medley relay	3:30.72	1 Q	—N/a		3:28.81	3rd place, bronze medalist(s)

Women

Athlete	Event	Heat		Semifinal		Final	
Athlete	Event	Time	Rank	Time	Rank	Time	Rank
Veronika Andrusenko	100 m freestyle	54.78	24	Did not advance			
Veronika Andrusenko	200 m freestyle	1:57.77	10 Q	1:57.65	13	Did not advance	
Veronika Andrusenko	400 m freestyle	4:06.28	6 Q	—N/a		4:08.60	8
Anastasiia Avdeeva	200 m backstroke	2:10.34	11 Q	2:09.78	10	Did not advance	
Viktoriya Belyakova	200 m individual medley	2:14.65	20	Did not advance			
Anna Belousova	50 m breaststroke	31.20	=13 Q	31.56	15	Did not advance	
Anna Belousova	100 m breaststroke	1:07.56	14 Q	1:07.17	13	Did not advance	
Svetlana Chimrova	50 m butterfly	26.64	21	Did not advance			
Svetlana Chimrova	100 m butterfly	58.10	13 Q	57.78	11	Did not advance	
Svetlana Chimrova	200 m butterfly	2:08.26	4 Q	2:08.30	7 Q	2:08.70	7
Anna Egorova	400 m freestyle	4:07.10	8 Q	—N/a		4:06.16	7
Anna Egorova	800 m freestyle	8:34.73	12	—N/a		Did not advance	
Anastasia Fesikova	50 m backstroke	28.02	8 Q	28.01	11	Did not advance	
Anastasia Fesikova	100 m backstroke	1:00.38	13 Q	1:00.33	14	Did not advance	
Maria Kameneva	50 m freestyle	24.44	=4 Q	24.33	5 Q	24.31	5
Maria Kameneva	100 m freestyle	53.68	9 Q	53.45	=10	Did not advance	
Anastasiia Kirpichnikova	800 m freestyle	8:37.90	16	—N/a		Did not advance	
Anastasiia Kirpichnikova	1500 m freestyle	16:27.59	15	—N/a		Did not advance	
Valeriya Salamatina	200 m freestyle	1:57.98	11 Q	1:57.25	10	Did not advance	
Arina Surkova	50 m freestyle	25.19	=21	Did not advance			
Arina Surkova	50 m butterfly	26.32	=16 so	26.06	9	Did not advance	
Maria Temnikova	200 m breaststroke	2:25.98	12 Q	2:24.55	10	Did not advance	
Daria Ustinova	200 m backstroke	2:12.64	23	Did not advance			
Daria Vaskina	50 m backstroke	28.29	16 Q	27.79	8	27.51	3rd place, bronze medalist(s)
Daria Vaskina	100 m backstroke	1:00.66	16 Q	59.46	7 Q	59.74	8
Yuliya Yefimova	50 m breaststroke	30.63	5 Q	30.12	2 Q	30.15	3rd place, bronze medalist(s)
Yuliya Yefimova	100 m breaststroke	1:06.58	2 Q	1:05.56	1 Q	1:05.49	2nd place, silver medalist(s)
Yuliya Yefimova	200 m breaststroke	2:25.01	=5 Q	2:21.20	1 Q	2:20.17	1st place, gold medalist(s)
Maria Kameneva; Sofya Lobova; Arina Openysheva; Daria S. Ustinova	4×100 m freestyle relay	3:38.94	9	—N/a		Did not advance	
Veronika Andrusenko; Anastasia Guzhenkova; Anna Egorova; Daria Mullakaeva*; Valeriya Salamatina	4×200 m freestyle relay	7:52.66	3 Q	—N/a		7:48.25	5
Anna Belousova; Svetlana Chimrova; Daria S. Ustinova; Daria Vaskina	4×100 m medley relay	4:02.26	12	—N/a		Did not advance	

Mixed

Athlete	Event	Heat		Final	
Athlete	Event	Time	Rank	Time	Rank
Veronika Andrusenko*; Ivan Girev*; Vladislav Grinev; Maria Kameneva; Vladimir Morozov; Daria S. Ustinova; Mikhail Vekovishchev*	4×100 m freestyle relay	3:25.38	6 Q	3:22.72	5
Svetlana Chimrova; Maria Kameneva; Andrei Minakov*; Kirill Prigoda; Evgeny Rylov; Daria Vaskina*	4×100 m medley relay	3:43.30	3 Q	3:40.78	4

== Water polo ==
=== Women's tournament ===
Team roster

Head coach: Alexandr Gaidukov

№	Name	Pos.	Height	Weight	L/R	Date of birth	Club
1	Evgeniia Golovina	GK				14 July 1999 (aged 20)	(Russia) Uralochka Zlatoust
2	Maria Bersneva	FP	1.87 m (6 ft 2 in)			17 December 1998 (aged 20)	(Russia) Uralochka Zlatoust
3	Ekaterina Prokofyeva (C)	FP	1.76 m (5 ft 9 in)			13 March 1991 (aged 28)	(Russia) Kinef Kirishi
4	Elvina Karimova	FP	1.66 m (5 ft 5 in)			25 March 1994 (aged 25)	(Russia) Uralochka Zlatoust
5	Tatiana Tolkunova	FP	1.74 m (5 ft 9 in)			15 May 1999 (aged 20)	(Russia) Spartak Volgograd
6	Olga Gorbunova	FP				27 August 1993 (aged 25)	(Russia) Spartak Volgograd
7	Alena Serzhantova	FP	1.87 m (6 ft 2 in)			6 May 1998 (aged 21)	(Russia) SKIF-CSP Krylatskoye
8	Anastasia Simanovich	FP	1.72 m (5 ft 8 in)			23 January 1995 (aged 24)	(Russia) Kinef Kirishi
9	Anna Timofeeva	FP	1.78 m (5 ft 10 in)			18 July 1987 (aged 31)	(Russia) Yugra
10	Evgenia Soboleva	FP				26 August 1988 (aged 30)	(Russia) Kinef Kirishi
11	Evgeniya Ivanova	FP	1.76 m (5 ft 9 in)			26 July 1987 (aged 31)	(Russia) Kinef Kirishi
12	Daria Ryzhkova	FP				8 February 1995 (aged 24)	(Russia) Kinef Kirishi
13	Anna Karnaukh	GK	1.73 m (5 ft 8 in)			31 August 1993 (aged 25)	(Russia) Kinef Kirishi

Preliminary round

Pos	Team	Pld	W	D	L	GF	GA	GD	Pts	Qualification
1	Russia	3	3	0	0	65	23	+42	6	Quarterfinals
2	Hungary	3	2	0	1	91	31	+60	4	Playoffs
3	Canada	3	1	0	2	46	35	+11	2	Playoffs
4	South Korea (H)	3	0	0	3	3	116	−113	0	

Source: Sportresult
Rules for classification: 1) points; 2) head-to-head points; 3) head-to-head goal difference; 4) head-to-head number of goals scored; 5) Goal difference.
(H) Hosts

14 July 2019; 11:10	Report	Canada	10–18	Russia	Nambu University Aquatics Center, Gwangju; Referees: Alessandro Severo (ITA), Nenad Periš (CRO)
14 July 2019; 11:10	Report	Score by quarters: 1–2, 2–5, 4–5, 3–6			Nambu University Aquatics Center, Gwangju; Referees: Alessandro Severo (ITA), Nenad Periš (CRO)
14 July 2019; 11:10	Report	Christmas 3	Goals	Prokofyeva 3	Nambu University Aquatics Center, Gwangju; Referees: Alessandro Severo (ITA), Nenad Periš (CRO)

16 July 2019; 08:30	Report	South Korea	1–30	Russia	Nambu University Aquatics Center, Gwangju; Referees: Jaume Teixidó (ESP), Dion Willis (RSA)
16 July 2019; 08:30	Report	Score by quarters: 0–7, 0–9, 0–8, 1–6			Nambu University Aquatics Center, Gwangju; Referees: Jaume Teixidó (ESP), Dion Willis (RSA)
16 July 2019; 08:30	Report	Kyung 1	Goals	ten players 3	Nambu University Aquatics Center, Gwangju; Referees: Jaume Teixidó (ESP), Dion Willis (RSA)

18 July 2019; 20:30	Report	Hungary	12–17	Russia	Nambu University Aquatics Center, Gwangju; Referees: Vojin Putniković (SRB), Georgios Stavridis (GRE)
18 July 2019; 20:30	Report	Score by quarters: 4–6, 3–5, 1–2, 4–4			Nambu University Aquatics Center, Gwangju; Referees: Vojin Putniković (SRB), Georgios Stavridis (GRE)
18 July 2019; 20:30	Report	Vályi 4	Goals	Bersneva 4	Nambu University Aquatics Center, Gwangju; Referees: Vojin Putniković (SRB), Georgios Stavridis (GRE)

Quarterfinal

22 July 2019; 15:30	Report	Russia	7–9	Australia	Nambu University Aquatics Center, Gwangju; Referees: Alessandro Severo (ITA), Adrian Alexandrescu (ROU)
22 July 2019; 15:30	Report	Score by quarters: 1–2, 0–2, 3–2, 3–3			Nambu University Aquatics Center, Gwangju; Referees: Alessandro Severo (ITA), Adrian Alexandrescu (ROU)
22 July 2019; 15:30	Report	Karimova 2	Goals	Webster 3	Nambu University Aquatics Center, Gwangju; Referees: Alessandro Severo (ITA), Adrian Alexandrescu (ROU)

5–8th place semifinal

24 July 2019; 14:00	Report	Greece	4–13	Russia	Nambu University Aquatics Center, Gwangju; Referees: Stanko Ivanovski (MNE), Jaume Teixidó (ESP)
24 July 2019; 14:00	Report	Score by quarters: 0–2, 1–2, 2–4, 1–5			Nambu University Aquatics Center, Gwangju; Referees: Stanko Ivanovski (MNE), Jaume Teixidó (ESP)
24 July 2019; 14:00	Report	Plevritou 2	Goals	Bersneva, Karimova 3	Nambu University Aquatics Center, Gwangju; Referees: Stanko Ivanovski (MNE), Jaume Teixidó (ESP)

Fifth place game

26 July 2019; 15:30	Report	Russia	10–9	Italy	Nambu University Aquatics Center, Gwangju; Referees: Gabriella Várkonyi (HUN), Sebastien Dervieux (FRA)
26 July 2019; 15:30	Report	Score by quarters: 3–3, 1–2, 5–2, 1–2			Nambu University Aquatics Center, Gwangju; Referees: Gabriella Várkonyi (HUN), Sebastien Dervieux (FRA)
26 July 2019; 15:30	Report	three players 2	Goals	Bianconi, Chiappini 3	Nambu University Aquatics Center, Gwangju; Referees: Gabriella Várkonyi (HUN), Sebastien Dervieux (FRA)
