= Swimming at the 2019 World Aquatics Championships – Men's 200 metre freestyle =

Men's 200 metre freestyle at the 2019 World Aquatics Championships
- Venue: Nambu University Municipal Aquatics Center
- Location: Gwangju, South Korea
- Dates: 22 July (heats and semifinals); 23 July (final)
- Competitors: 66 from 58 nations
- Winning time: 1:44.93

Medalists
gold medal	Sun Yang	China
silver medal	Katsuhiro Matsumoto	Japan
bronze medal	Martin Malyutin	Russia
bronze medal	Duncan Scott	Great Britain

The Men's 200 metre freestyle competition at the 2019 World Championships was held on 22 and 23 July 2019. Sun Yang was the defending champion, and defended his title. Lithuania's Danas Rapšys finished first, but was disqualified for flinching just before the start. During the medal ceremony, Great Britain's Duncan Scott refused to shake hands with China's Sun Yang, with Sun Yang calling Scott a "loser" in response.

== Records ==
Prior to the competition, the existing world and championship records were as follows.

World record	Paul Biedermann (GER)	1:42.00	Rome, Italy	28 July 2009
Competition record	Paul Biedermann (GER)	1:42.00	Rome, Italy	28 July 2009

== Results ==
=== Heats ===
The heats were held on 22 July at 10:57.

Rank	Heat	Lane	Name	Nationality	Time	Note
1	7	2	James Guy	Great Britain	1:46.18	Q
2	5	4	Sun Yang	China	1:46.22	Q
3	7	5	Martin Malyutin	Russia	1:46.29	Q
4	5	5	Kyle Chalmers	Australia	1:46.36	Q
5	6	4	Duncan Scott	Great Britain	1:46.45	Q
6	6	6	Fernando Scheffer	Brazil	1:46.46	Q
7	7	3	Katsuhiro Matsumoto	Japan	1:46.51	Q
8	5	3	Dominik Kozma	Hungary	1:46.55	Q
9	7	4	Danas Rapšys	Lithuania	1:46.60	Q
10	6	2	Ji Xinjie	China	1:46.62	Q
11	5	6	Mikhail Dovgalyuk	Russia	1:46.72	Q
12	6	3	Andrew Seliskar	United States	1:46.74	Q
13	6	5	Townley Haas	United States	1:46.85	Q
14	7	6	Clyde Lewis	Australia	1:46.93	Q
15	7	7	Filippo Megli	Italy	1:46.95	Q
16	6	7	Maarten Brzoskowski	Netherlands	1:47.06	Q
17	5	7	Breno Correia	Brazil	1:47.26	
18	6	1	Jacob Heidtmann	Germany	1:47.38	
19	5	1	Velimir Stjepanović	Serbia	1:47.40	
20	5	2	Naito Ehara	Japan	1:47.46	
21	7	8	Poul Zellmann	Germany	1:47.65	
22	7	1	Khader Baqlah	Jordan	1:47.72	
23	6	8	Kacper Majchrzak	Poland	1:48.05	
24	4	9	Cristian Quintero	Venezuela	1:48.10	
25	7	9	Nils Liess	Switzerland	1:48.29	
26	4	3	Kregor Zirk	Estonia	1:48.51	NR
27	2	3	Alexei Sancov	Moldova	1:48.60	
27	7	0	Jordan Sloan	Ireland	1:48.60	
29	5	8	Welson Sim	Malaysia	1:48.61	
30	6	0	Denis Loktev	Israel	1:48.76	
31	5	9	Lee Ho-joon	South Korea	1:48.89	
32	4	2	Mikel Schreuders	Aruba	1:48.92	
33	3	4	Erge Gezmis	Turkey	1:49.35	
34	4	5	Matthew Stanley	New Zealand	1:49.36	
35	4	4	Alexander Pratt	Canada	1:49.56	
35	4	6	Darren Chua	Singapore	1:49.56	
37	6	9	Miguel Nascimento	Portugal	1:49.71	
38	3	5	Pit Brandenburger	Luxembourg	1:50.10	
39	2	4	Mokhtar Al-Yamani	Yemen	1:50.18	
40	4	0	An Ting-yao	Chinese Taipei	1:50.48	
41	4	8	Ognjen Marić	Croatia	1:50.84	
42	2	5	Michael Gunning	Jamaica	1:51.14	
43	4	1	Wesley Roberts	Cook Islands	1:51.25	
44	3	6	Eben Vorster	South Africa	1:51.70	
45	3	2	Marko Kovačić	Bosnia and Herzegovina	1:51.78	
46	3	9	Alex Sobers	Barbados	1:51.89	
47	3	1	Aflah Prawira	Indonesia	1:51.91	
48	3	8	Igor Mogne	Mozambique	1:52.19	
49	3	0	Cheuk Ming Ho	Hong Kong	1:52.34	
49	3	3	Sajan Prakash	India	1:52.34	
51	2	1	Omar Abbas	Syria	1:52.78	
52	3	7	Andrew Digby	Thailand	1:53.01	
53	2	2	Jorge Depassier	Chile	1:53.62	
54	2	9	Audai Hassouna	Libya	1:53.74	
55	1	5	Irakli Revishvili	Georgia	1:54.00	
56	2	8	Noah Mascoll-Gomes	Antigua and Barbuda	1:54.20	
57	1	6	Kledi Kadiu	Albania	1:55.11	
58	2	6	Alireza Yavari	Iran	1:56.28	
59	1	3	Jordan Crooks	Cayman Islands	1:56.33	
60	1	1	Yacob Al-Khulaifi	Qatar	1:56.57	
61	2	0	Lin Sizhuang	Macau	1:57.37	
62	1	4	Matt Galea	Malta	1:58.57	
63	1	2	Noel Keane	Palau	2:02.63	
64	1	7	Dren Ukimeraj	Kosovo	2:05.29	
65	1	8	Mubal Ibrahim	Maldives	2:09.06	NR
	4	7	Marwan El-Kamash	Egypt	DNS	
	5	0	Felix Auböck	Austria	DNS	
	2	7	James Freeman	Botswana	DSQ	

=== Semifinals ===
The semifinals were held on 22 July at 21:12.

==== Semifinal 1 ====
Rank	Lane	Name	Nationality	Time	Notes
1	1	Clyde Lewis	Australia	1:44.90	Q
2	4	Sun Yang	China	1:45.31	Q
3	6	Dominik Kozma	Hungary	1:45.57	Q
4	3	Fernando Scheffer	Brazil	1:45.83	
5	2	Ji Xinjie	China	1:45.88	
6	5	Kyle Chalmers	Australia	1:46.21	
7	7	Andrew Seliskar	United States	1:46.83	
8	8	Maarten Brzoskowski	Netherlands	1:47.13	

==== Semifinal 2 ====
Rank	Lane	Name	Nationality	Time	Notes
1	2	Danas Rapšys	Lithuania	1:45.44	Q
2	3	Duncan Scott	Great Britain	1:45.56	Q
2	6	Katsuhiro Matsumoto	Japan	1:45.56	Q
4	5	Martin Malyutin	Russia	1:45.60	Q
5	8	Filippo Megli	Italy	1:45.76	Q, NR
6	4	James Guy	Great Britain	1:45.95	
7	7	Mikhail Dovgalyuk	Russia	1:46.20	
8	1	Townley Haas	United States	1:46.37	

=== Final ===
The final was held on 23 July at 20:02.

Rank	Lane	Name	Nationality	Time	Notes
1st place, gold medalist(s)	5	Sun Yang	China	1:44.93	
2nd place, silver medalist(s)	2	Katsuhiro Matsumoto	Japan	1:45.22	NR
3rd place, bronze medalist(s)	1	Martin Malyutin	Russia	1:45.63	
3rd place, bronze medalist(s)	6	Duncan Scott	Great Britain	1:45.63	
5	8	Filippo Megli	Italy	1:45.67	NR
6	4	Clyde Lewis	Australia	1:45.78	
7	7	Dominik Kozma	Hungary	1:45.90	
	3	Danas Rapšys	Lithuania	DSQ	
