= Swimming at the 2019 World Aquatics Championships – Women's 100 metre freestyle =

Women's 100 metre freestyle at the 2019 World Aquatics Championships
- Venue: Nambu University Municipal Aquatics Center
- Location: Gwangju, South Korea
- Dates: 25 July (heats and semifinals); 26 July (final)
- Competitors: 93 from 85 nations
- Winning time: 52.04

Medalists
gold medal	Simone Manuel	United States
silver medal	Cate Campbell	Australia
bronze medal	Sarah Sjöström	Sweden

The Women's 100 metre freestyle competition at the 2019 World Championships was held on 25 and 26 July 2019.

== Records ==
Prior to the competition, the existing world and championship records were as follows.

World record	Sarah Sjöström (SWE)	51.71	Budapest, Hungary	23 July 2017
Competition record	Sarah Sjöström (SWE)	51.71	Budapest, Hungary	23 July 2017

== Results ==
=== Heats ===
The heats were held on 25 July at 10:00.

Rank	Heat	Lane	Name	Nationality	Time	Notes
1	8	4	Simone Manuel	United States	53.10	Q
2	10	5	Sarah Sjöström	Sweden	53.11	Q
3	8	7	Anna Hopkin	Great Britain	53.21	Q
4	10	4	Cate Campbell	Australia	53.36	Q
5	9	3	Femke Heemskerk	Netherlands	53.56	Q
6	10	3	Mallory Comerford	United States	53.57	Q
7	9	4	Emma McKeon	Australia	53.58	Q
8	8	5	Charlotte Bonnet	France	53.67	Q
9	9	6	Maria Kameneva	Russia	53.68	Q
10	9	5	Taylor Ruck	Canada	53.69	Q
11	10	2	Freya Anderson	Great Britain	53.77	Q
12	10	6	Siobhán Haughey	Hong Kong	53.81	Q
13	10	7	Béryl Gastaldello	France	53.95	Q
14	8	3	Ranomi Kromowidjojo	Netherlands	53.99	Q
15	9	2	Michelle Coleman	Sweden	54.01	Q
16	9	0	Zhu Menghui	China	54.25	Q
17	8	9	Julie Meynen	Luxembourg	54.44	NR
18	7	4	Maria Ugolkova	Switzerland	54.54	
19	8	1	Barbora Seemanová	Czech Republic	54.62	
20	9	8	Erin Gallagher	South Africa	54.64	
21	7	5	Andrea Murez	Israel	54.67	
22	8	2	Federica Pellegrini	Italy	54.68	
22	10	8	Katarzyna Wilk	Poland	54.68	
24	8	8	Veronika Andrusenko	Russia	54.78	
25	10	9	Neža Klančar	Slovenia	54.88	
26	10	1	Rika Omoto	Japan	54.89	
27	7	3	Valentine Dumont	Belgium	54.90	NR
28	6	4	Farida Osman	Egypt	54.93	NR
29	8	0	Lidón Muñoz del Campo	Spain	55.23	
30	7	2	Theodora Drakou	Greece	55.50	
31	10	0	Anika Apostalon	Czech Republic	55.51	
32	9	9	Quah Ting Wen	Singapore	55.60	
33	9	7	Signe Bro	Denmark	55.65	
34	7	7	Selen Özbilen	Turkey	55.71	
35	7	6	Jeong So-eun	South Korea	55.86	
36	6	5	Remedy Rule	Philippines	56.13	
37	7	8	Ieva Maļuka	Latvia	56.19	
38	7	0	Aksana Dziamidava	Belarus	56.33	
39	6	3	Kalia Antoniou	Cyprus	56.53	
40	7	9	Aleksa Gold	Estonia	56.62	
41	6	7	Anicka Delgado	Ecuador	56.67	NR
42	6	9	Elan Daley	Bermuda	57.00	
43	6	6	Snæfríður Jórunnardóttir	Iceland	57.34	
44	6	2	Karen Torrez	Bolivia	57.37	
45	6	8	Sirena Rowe	Colombia	57.42	
46	6	1	Allyson Ponson	Aruba	57.67	
47	5	4	Matelita Buadromo	Fiji	57.93	
48	2	3	Talita Baqlah	Jordan	58.06	
49	5	3	Mariel Mencia	Dominican Republic	58.82	
50	6	0	Gabriela Santis	Guatemala	58.93	
51	5	2	Maria Brunlehner	Kenya	59.08	
51	5	5	Maria Schutzmeier	Nicaragua	59.08	
53	4	5	Natalya Kritinina	Uzbekistan	59.19	
54	2	1	Catarina Sousa	Angola	59.28	
55	5	6	Mya Azzopardi	Malta	59.37	
56	5	7	Lauren Hew	Cayman Islands	59.57	
57	4	8	Nikol Merizaj	Albania	59.60	
58	5	1	Inés Remersaro	Uruguay	59.69	
59	4	2	Batbayaryn Enkhkhüslen	Mongolia	59.76	
60	4	6	Jeanne Boutbien	Senegal	59.79	
61	5	0	Ani Poghosyan	Armenia	59.89	
62	4	4	Lina Khiyara	Morocco	59.93	
63	4	3	Mariam Imnadze	Georgia	59.97	
64	5	8	Catharine Cooper	Panama	1:00.08	
65	4	1	Mikaili Charlemagne	Saint Lucia	1:00.27	
66	4	9	Kaya Forson	Ghana	1:00.29	NR
67	5	9	Paige van der Westhuizen	Zimbabwe	1:00.47	
68	4	7	Samantha Roberts	Antigua and Barbuda	1:00.53	
69	4	0	Gaurika Singh	Nepal	1:00.62	
70	3	4	Anastasiia Filina	Kyrgyzstan	1:01.07	
71	3	3	Abiola Ogunbanwo	Nigeria	1:01.31	
72	3	5	Andela Antunović	Montenegro	1:01.38	
73	3	2	Yusra Mardini	FINA Independent Athletes	1:01.75	
74	3	6	Fjorda Shabani	Kosovo	1:02.05	
75	3	0	Georgia-Leigh Vele	Papua New Guinea	1:02.45	
76	2	9	Latroya Pina	Cape Verde	1:03.88	
76	3	7	Selina Katumba	Uganda	1:03.88	
78	3	8	Mya de Freitas	Saint Vincent and the Grenadines	1:03.91	
79	3	1	Mineri Gomez	Guam	1:05.11	
80	2	6	Mishael Ayub	Pakistan	1:05.58	
81	1	2	Alaa Binrajab	Bahrain	1:07.08	
81	3	9	Margie Winter	Micronesia	1:07.08	
83	2	8	Osisang Chilton	Palau	1:07.36	
84	2	2	Charissa Panuve	Tonga	1:08.00	
85	1	4	Jennifer Harding-Marlin	Saint Kitts and Nevis	1:08.05	
86	2	0	Ekaterina Bordachyova	Tajikistan	1:10.13	
87	1	5	Jin Ju Thompson	Northern Mariana Islands	1:10.31	
88	1	3	Nada Arkaji	Qatar	1:12.91	
89	2	4	Tayamika Chang'anamuno	Malawi	1:13.46	
90	1	7	Lina Selo	Ethiopia	1:14.88	
91	2	5	Imelda Ximenes	Timor-Leste	1:18.03	
92	1	6	Roukaya Mahamane	Niger	1:21.51	
93	2	7	Haneen Ibrahim	Sudan	1:22.18	
	7	1	Evelyn Verrasztó	Hungary	DNS	
	8	6	Penny Oleksiak	Canada	DNS	
	9	1	Yang Junxuan	China	DNS	

=== Semifinals ===
The semifinals were held on 25 July at 20:11.

==== Semifinal 1 ====
Rank	Lane	Name	Nationality	Time	Notes
1	4	Sarah Sjöström	Sweden	52.43	Q
2	5	Cate Campbell	Australia	52.71	Q
3	2	Taylor Ruck	Canada	53.04	Q
4	3	Mallory Comerford	United States	53.10	Q
5	1	Ranomi Kromowidjojo	Netherlands	53.43	
6	7	Siobhán Haughey	Hong Kong	53.45	
7	6	Charlotte Bonnet	France	53.62	
8	8	Zhu Menghui	China	54.07	

==== Semifinal 2 ====
Rank	Lane	Name	Nationality	Time	Notes
1	6	Emma McKeon	Australia	52.77	Q
2	3	Femke Heemskerk	Netherlands	53.16	Q
3	4	Simone Manuel	United States	53.31	Q
3	7	Freya Anderson	Great Britain	53.31	Q
5	2	Maria Kameneva	Russia	53.45	NR
6	5	Anna Hopkin	Great Britain	53.65	
7	1	Béryl Gastaldello	France	54.31	
8	8	Michelle Coleman	Sweden	54.56	

=== Final ===
The final was held on 26 July at 20:02.

Rank	Lane	Name	Nationality	Time	Notes
1st place, gold medalist(s)	1	Simone Manuel	United States	52.04	AM
2nd place, silver medalist(s)	5	Cate Campbell	Australia	52.43	
3rd place, bronze medalist(s)	4	Sarah Sjöström	Sweden	52.46	
4	3	Emma McKeon	Australia	52.75	
5	6	Taylor Ruck	Canada	53.03	
6	7	Femke Heemskerk	Netherlands	53.05	
7	2	Mallory Comerford	United States	53.22	
8	8	Freya Anderson	Great Britain	53.44	
