= Swimming at the 2019 World Aquatics Championships – Men's 800 metre freestyle =

Men's 800 metre freestyle at the 2019 World Aquatics Championships
- Venue: Nambu University Municipal Aquatics Center
- Location: Gwangju, South Korea
- Dates: 23 July (heats); 24 July (final)
- Competitors: 38 from 33 nations
- Winning time: 7:39.27

Medalists
gold medal	Gregorio Paltrinieri	Italy
silver medal	Henrik Christiansen	Norway
bronze medal	David Aubry	France

The Men's 800 metre freestyle competition at the 2019 World Championships was held on 23 and 24 July 2019. The defending champion was Gabriele Detti, but he finished 5th in the final. The champion, Gregorio Paltrinieri, was the defending bronze medalist.

== Records ==
Prior to the competition, the existing world and championship records were as follows.

World record	Zhang Lin (CHN)	7:32.12	Rome, Italy	29 July 2009
Competition record	Zhang Lin (CHN)	7:32.12	Rome, Italy	29 July 2009

== Results ==
=== Heats ===
The heats were held on 23 July at 11:05.

Rank	Heat	Lane	Name	Nationality	Time	Notes
1	3	3	Gregorio Paltrinieri	Italy	7:45.70	Q
2	3	6	David Aubry	France	7:46.37	Q
3	4	2	Jack McLoughlin	Australia	7:46.42	Q
4	3	5	Gabriele Detti	Italy	7:46.46	Q
5	4	3	Henrik Christiansen	Norway	7:46.53	Q
6	4	4	Mykhailo Romanchuk	Ukraine	7:47.01	Q
7	4	1	Serhiy Frolov	Ukraine	7:47.25	Q
8	3	2	Sun Yang	China	7:48.12	Q
9	4	7	Anton Ipsen	Denmark	7:48.74	NR
10	3	7	Jan Micka	Czech Republic	7:48.93	NR
11	4	5	Zane Grothe	United States	7:50.14	
12	4	8	Damien Joly	France	7:50.30	
13	2	4	Wojciech Wojdak	Poland	7:50.64	
14	4	0	Mack Horton	Australia	7:52.65	
15	4	9	Nguyễn Huy Hoàng	Vietnam	7:52.74	
16	4	6	Jordan Wilimovsky	United States	7:53.11	
17	3	4	Florian Wellbrock	Germany	7:53.75	
18	3	8	Ilya Druzhinin	Russia	7:54.07	
19	3	9	Ákos Kalmár	Hungary	7:54.55	
20	2	6	Zac Reid	New Zealand	7:57.46	
21	3	1	Guilherme Costa	Brazil	7:58.67	
22	2	2	Dimitrios Negris	Greece	7:58.99	
23	3	0	Vuk Čelić	Serbia	7:59.17	
24	2	5	Felix Auböck	Austria	8:02.26	
25	2	0	Aflah Prawira	Indonesia	8:06.58	
26	2	3	Marwan El-Kamash	Egypt	8:07.97	
27	2	8	Huang Guo-ting	Chinese Taipei	8:08.76	
28	2	9	Christian Bayo	Puerto Rico	8:08.78	
29	2	7	Page Advait	India	8:10.35	
30	1	5	Glen Lim Jun Wei	Singapore	8:13.02	
31	2	1	Kim Woo-min	South Korea	8:14.44	
32	1	4	Cheuk Ming Ho	Hong Kong	8:15.22	
33	1	3	Joaquín Moreno	Argentina	8:18.24	
34	1	1	Daniel Jacobs	Aruba	8:22.96	
35	1	2	Pit Brandenburger	Luxembourg	8:23.99	
36	1	6	Oil Mortensen	Faroe Islands	8:24.02	
37	1	7	Franci Aleksi	Albania	8:33.54	
38	1	8	Filip Derkoski	North Macedonia	8:35.54	

=== Final ===
The final was held on 24 July at 20:02.

Rank	Lane	Name	Nationality	Time	Notes
1st place, gold medalist(s)	4	Gregorio Paltrinieri	Italy	7:39.27	ER
2nd place, silver medalist(s)	2	Henrik Christiansen	Norway	7:41.28	NR
3rd place, bronze medalist(s)	5	David Aubry	France	7:42.08	NR
4	3	Jack McLoughlin	Australia	7:42.64	
5	6	Gabriele Detti	Italy	7:43.89	
6	8	Sun Yang	China	7:45.01	
7	1	Serhiy Frolov	Ukraine	7:47.32	
8	7	Mykhailo Romanchuk	Ukraine	7:49.32	
