= Ousmane Touré (swimmer) =

Malian swimmer

Personal information
- Born: 1 November 2002 (age 23)

Sport
- Sport: Swimming

Ousmane Touré (born 1 November 2002) is a Malian swimmer. In 2019, he represented Mali at the 2019 World Aquatics Championships in Gwangju, South Korea. He competed in the men's 50 metre butterfly and men's 100 metre butterfly events, where he did not advance to compete in the semi-finals.

In 2018, he competed in the boys' 50 metre butterfly and boys' 100 metre butterfly events at the 2018 Summer Youth Olympics held in Buenos Aires, Argentina. The following year, he represented Mali at the 2019 African Games held in Rabat, Morocco. He competed in the men's 50 metre butterfly and men's 100 metre butterfly events, and in both events he did not advance to compete in the final.
