= Brazil at the 2019 World Aquatics Championships =

- Flag of Brazil
- World Aquatics code: BRA
- National federation: Brazilian Confederation of Water Sports
- Website: cbda.org.br (in Portuguese)

in Gwangju, South Korea
- Competitors: 63 in 6 sports
- Medals Ranked 9th: Gold 2 Silver 3 Bronze 2 Total 7

World Aquatics Championships appearances (overview)
- 1973; 1975; 1978; 1982; 1986; 1991; 1994; 1998; 2001; 2003; 2005; 2007; 2009; 2011; 2013; 2015; 2017; 2019; 2022; 2023; 2024; 2025

Brazil competed at the 2019 World Aquatics Championships in Gwangju, South Korea from 12 to 28 July.

== Medalists ==
Medal	Name	Sport	Event	Date
Gold	Ana Marcela Cunha	Open water swimming	Women's 5 km	July 17
Gold	Ana Marcela Cunha	Open water swimming	Women's 25 km	July 19
Silver	Felipe Lima	Swimming	Men's 50 metre breaststroke	July 24
Silver	Etiene Medeiros	Swimming	Women's 50 metre backstroke	July 25
Silver	Bruno Fratus	Swimming	Men's 50 metre freestyle	July 27
Bronze	Nicholas Santos	Swimming	Men's 50 metre butterfly	July 22
Bronze	João Gomes Júnior	Swimming	Men's 50 metre breaststroke	July 24

== Artistic swimming ==
Brazil's artistic swimming team consisted of 12 athletes (11 female and 1 male).

Women

Athlete	Event	Preliminaries		Final	
Athlete	Event	Points	Rank	Points	Rank
Luisa Borges; Maria Coutinho	Duet technical routine	81.0395	17	Did not advance	
Luisa Borges; Maria Coutinho	Duet free routine	DNS		Did not advance	
Luisa Borges; Maria Bruno; Laura Miccuci; Maria Eduarda Miccuci; Lorena Molinos; Gabriela Regly; Giovana Stephan; Anna Giulia Veloso; Jullia Catharino (R); Maria Coutinho (R)	Team technical routine	80.6196	15	Did not advance	
Luisa Borges; Maria Bruno; Laura Miccuci; Maria Eduarda Miccuci; Lorena Molinos; Gabriela Regly; Giovana Stephan; Anna Giulia Veloso; Jullia Catharino (R); Maria Coutinho (R)	Team free routine	80.0667	16	Did not advance	
Luisa Borges; Maria Bruno; Vitoria Casale; Jullia Catharino; Maria Coutinho; Laura Miccuci; Maria Eduarda Miccuci; Lorena Molinos; Gabriela Regly; Giovana Stephan; Anna Giulia Veloso	Free routine combination	81.6667	9 Q	83.6333	8

Mixed

Athlete	Event	Preliminaries		Final	
Athlete	Event	Points	Rank	Points	Rank
Renan Souza; Giovana Stephan	Duet technical routine	78.1404	7 Q	79.4495	7
Renan Souza; Giovana Stephan	Duet free routine	81.2333	7 Q	81.2333	7

Legend: (R) = Reserve Athlete

== Diving ==
Brazil has entered 9 divers.

Men

Athlete	Event	Preliminaries		Semifinals		Final	
Athlete	Event	Points	Rank	Points	Rank	Points	Rank
Luis Filipe Bonfim	1 m springboard	264.45	37	—N/a		Did not advance	
Luis Filipe Bonfim	3 m springboard	287.95	51	Did not advance			
Kawan Figueredo	1 m springboard	323.40	22	—N/a		Did not advance	
Kawan Figueredo	3 m springboard	275.90	52	Did not advance			
Kawan Figueredo	10 m platform	309.15	37	Did not advance			
Isaac Souza	10 m platform	397.90	14 Q	404.50	13	Did not advance	
Luis Filipe Bonfim; Kawan Figueredo	3 m synchronized springboard	297.15	21	—N/a		Did not advance	
Kawan Figueredo; Isaac Souza	10 m synchronized platform	342.06	10	—N/a		348.78	12

Women

Athlete	Event	Preliminaries		Semifinals		Final	
Athlete	Event	Points	Rank	Points	Rank	Points	Rank
Danielle Robles	1 m springboard	124.95	43	—N/a		Did not advance	
Luana Lira	1 m springboard	202.35	32	—N/a		Did not advance	
Luana Lira	3 m springboard	220.20	41	Did not advance			
Juliana Veloso	3 m springboard	206.70	43	Did not advance			
Andressa Mendes	10 m platform	195.80	36	Did not advance			
Luana Lira; Tammy Takagi	3 m synchronized springboard	242.07	16	—N/a		Did not advance	

Mixed

Athlete	Event	Final	
Athlete	Event	Points	Rank
Luis Filipe Bonfim; Tammy Takagi	3 m synchronized springboard	249.30	16
Isaac Souza Filho; Ingrid Oliveira	10 m synchronized platform	239.46	8
Isaac Souza Filho; Tammy Takagi	Team	287.10	15

== High diving ==
Brazil qualified one female high diver.

Athlete	Event	Points	Rank
Jacqueline Valente	Women's high diving	223.60	9

== Open water swimming ==
Brazil qualified four male and two female open water swimmers.

Men

Athlete	Event	Time	Rank
Victor Colonese	Men's 10 km	1:50:15.2	35
Allan do Carmo	Men's 10 km	1:50:14.7	33
Fernando Ponte	Men's 5 km	53:43.6	=25
Diogo Villarinho	Men's 5 km	53:55.4	36

Women

Athlete	Event	Time	Rank
Ana Marcela Cunha	Women's 5 km	57:56.0	1st place, gold medalist(s)
Ana Marcela Cunha	Women's 10 km	1:54:50.5	5
Ana Marcela Cunha	Women's 25 km	5:08:03.0	1st place, gold medalist(s)
Viviane Jungblut	Women's 5 km	58:17.4	21
Viviane Jungblut	Women's 10 km	1:54:51.9	12

Mixed

Athlete	Event	Time	Rank
Ana Marcela Cunha; Viviane Jungblut; Diogo Villarinho; Fernando Ponte	Team	54:24.5	4

== Swimming ==
Brazil has entered 22 swimmers.

Men

Athlete	Event	Heat		Semifinal		Final	
Athlete	Event	Time	Rank	Time	Rank	Time	Rank
Bruno Fratus	50 m freestyle	21.71	4 Q	21.53	2 Q	21.45	2nd place, silver medalist(s)
Marcelo Chierighini	50 m freestyle	22.03	10 Q	22.19	16	Did not advance	
Marcelo Chierighini	100 m freestyle	47.95	3 Q	47.76	3 Q	47.93	5
Breno Correia	100 m freestyle	48.39	7 Q	48.33	8 Q	48.90	8
Breno Correia	200 m freestyle	1:47.26	17	Did not advance			
Fernando Scheffer	200 m freestyle	1:46.46	6 Q	1:45.83	9	Did not advance	
Guilherme Costa	800 m freestyle	7:58.67	21	—N/a		Did not advance	
Guilherme Costa	1500 m freestyle	15:20.73	25	—N/a		Did not advance	
Diogo Villarinho	1500 m freestyle	15:15.91	22	—N/a		Did not advance	
Guilherme Guido	50 m backstroke	24.98	8 Q	24.87	9	Did not advance	
Guilherme Guido	100 m backstroke	52.95 SA	2 Q	53.23	7 Q	53.26	7
Leonardo de Deus	200 m backstroke	1:58.74	22	Did not advance			
Leonardo de Deus	200 m butterfly	1:56.05	4 Q	1:55.71	4 Q	1:55.96	7
João Gomes Júnior	50 m breaststroke	26.73	2 Q	26.84	5 Q	26.69	3rd place, bronze medalist(s)
João Gomes Júnior	100 m breaststroke	59.25	7 Q	59.32	11	Did not advance	
Felipe Lima	50 m breaststroke	26.73	2 Q	26.62	2 Q	26.66	2nd place, silver medalist(s)
Felipe Lima	100 m breaststroke	1:00.00	18	Did not advance			
Nicholas Santos	50 m butterfly	23.48	11 Q	22.77	2 Q	22.79	3rd place, bronze medalist(s)
Vinicius Lanza	50 m butterfly	23.91	28	Did not advance			
Vinicius Lanza	100 m butterfly	51.83	6 Q	51.92	12	Did not advance	
Luiz Altamir Melo	400 m freestyle	3:48.87	15	—N/a		Did not advance	
Luiz Altamir Melo	200 m butterfly	1:57.08	13 Q	1:57.43	13	Did not advance	
Caio Pumputis	200 m breaststroke	DSQ	DSQ	Did not advance			
Caio Pumputis	200 m individual medley	2:01.06	23	Did not advance			
Leonardo Coelho Santos	200 m individual medley	1:59.37	13 Q	1:58.99	14	Did not advance	
Brandonn Almeida	400 m individual medley	4:15.92	11	—N/a		Did not advance	
Marcelo Chierighini; Pedro Spajari; Bruno Fratus; Breno Correia; André Calvelo*	4 × 100 m freestyle relay	3:12.97	6 Q	—N/a		3:11.99	6
Luiz Altamir Melo; Fernando Scheffer; João de Lucca; Breno Correia	4 × 200 m freestyle relay	7:07.12 SA	6 Q	—N/a		7:07.64	7
Guilherme Guido; João Gomes Júnior; Vinicius Lanza; Marcelo Chierighini; Breno Correia*	4 × 100 m medley relay	3:32.58	6 Q	—N/a		3:30.86	6

Women

Athlete	Event	Heat		Semifinal		Final	
Athlete	Event	Time	Rank	Time	Rank	Time	Rank
Etiene Medeiros	50 m freestyle	25.26	23	Did not advance			
Etiene Medeiros	50 m backstroke	27.85	2 Q	27.69	2 Q	27.44	2nd place, silver medalist(s)
Viviane Jungblut	800 m freestyle	8:42.52	19	—N/a		Did not advance	
Viviane Jungblut	1500 m freestyle	16:36.25	20	—N/a		Did not advance	

Legend: (*) = Swimmers who participated in the heat only.

== Water polo ==
=== Men's tournament ===
Team roster

- Slobodan Soro (C)
- Logan Cabral
- Pedro Real
- Gustavo Coutinho
- Roberto Freitas
- Guilherme Almeida
- Rafael Real
- Heitor Carrulo
- Bernardo Rocha
- Rudá Franco
- Gustavo Guimarães
- Luis Ricardo Silva
- João Pedro Fernandes
- Coach: Rick Azavedo

Group D

Pos	Team	Pld	W	D	L	GF	GA	GD	Pts	Qualification
1	Italy	3	3	0	0	31	19	+12	6	Quarterfinals
2	Germany	3	1	1	1	31	25	+6	3	Playoffs
3	Japan	3	1	1	1	27	27	0	3	Playoffs
4	Brazil	3	0	0	3	22	40	−18	0	

Source: Sportresult
Rules for classification: 1) points; 2) head-to-head points; 3) head-to-head goal difference; 4) head-to-head number of goals scored; 5) Goal difference.

15 July 2019; 19:10	Report	Brazil	5–14	Italy	Nambu University Aquatics Center, Gwangju; Referees: Stanko Ivanovski (MNE); Jaume Teixido Bermudez (ESP)
15 July 2019; 19:10	Report	Score by quarters: 3–5, 1–2, 0–5, 1–2			Nambu University Aquatics Center, Gwangju; Referees: Stanko Ivanovski (MNE); Jaume Teixido Bermudez (ESP)
15 July 2019; 19:10	Report	Guimarães 2	Goals	Luongo 4	Nambu University Aquatics Center, Gwangju; Referees: Stanko Ivanovski (MNE); Jaume Teixido Bermudez (ESP)

17 July 2019; 17:50	Report	Brazil	8–15	Germany	Nambu University Aquatics Center, Gwangju; Referees: Nenad Periš (CRO), Arkadiy Voevodin (RUS)
17 July 2019; 17:50	Report	Score by quarters: 1–4, 1–6, 2–2, 4–3			Nambu University Aquatics Center, Gwangju; Referees: Nenad Periš (CRO), Arkadiy Voevodin (RUS)
17 July 2019; 17:50	Report	Coutinho 3	Goals	Stamm 5	Nambu University Aquatics Center, Gwangju; Referees: Nenad Periš (CRO), Arkadiy Voevodin (RUS)

19 July 2019; 11:10	Report	Brazil	9–11	Japan	Nambu University Aquatics Center, Gwangju; Referees: Nenad Periš (CRO), Viktor Salnichenko (KAZ)
19 July 2019; 11:10	Report	Score by quarters: 2–2, 1–5, 3–3, 3–1			Nambu University Aquatics Center, Gwangju; Referees: Nenad Periš (CRO), Viktor Salnichenko (KAZ)
19 July 2019; 11:10	Report	Guimarães 3	Goals	Shiga, Yoshida 3	Nambu University Aquatics Center, Gwangju; Referees: Nenad Periš (CRO), Viktor Salnichenko (KAZ)

13th–16th place semifinals

21 July 2019; 12:00	Report	New Zealand	8–12	Brazil	Nambu University Aquatics Center, Gwangju; Referees: Frank Ohme (GER), Kunihiro Sato (JPN)
21 July 2019; 12:00	Report	Score by quarters: 1–2, 4–6, 2–2, 1–2			Nambu University Aquatics Center, Gwangju; Referees: Frank Ohme (GER), Kunihiro Sato (JPN)
21 July 2019; 12:00	Report	Small 3	Goals	P. Real, Guimarães 3	Nambu University Aquatics Center, Gwangju; Referees: Frank Ohme (GER), Kunihiro Sato (JPN)

13th place game

23 July 2019; 09:30	Report	Kazakhstan	8–9	Brazil	Nambu University Aquatics Center, Gwangju; Referees: Nenad Peris (CRO), Frank Ohme (GER)
23 July 2019; 09:30	Report	Score by quarters: 3–3, 2–2, 1–2, 2–2			Nambu University Aquatics Center, Gwangju; Referees: Nenad Peris (CRO), Frank Ohme (GER)
23 July 2019; 09:30	Report	three players 2	Goals	R. Real 3	Nambu University Aquatics Center, Gwangju; Referees: Nenad Peris (CRO), Frank Ohme (GER)
