= Artistic swimming at the 2019 World Aquatics Championships – Mixed duet technical routine =

2019 artistic swimming competition

Mixed duet technical routine at the 2019 World Aquatics Championships
- Venue: Yeomju Gymnasium
- Location: Gwangju, South Korea
- Dates: 13–15 July
- Competitors: 18 from 9 nations
- Teams: 9
- Winning points: 92.0749

Medalists
gold medal	Mayya Gurbanberdieva; Aleksandr Maltsev	Russia
silver medal	Manila Flamini; Giorgio Minisini	Italy
bronze medal	Yumi Adachi; Atsushi Abe	Japan

The Mixed duet technical routine competition at the 2019 World Aquatics Championships was held on 13 and 15 July 2019.

== Results ==
The preliminary round was started on 13 July at 11:00. The final was held on 15 July at 17:00.

Green denotes finalists

Rank	Nation	Swimmers	Preliminary		Final	
Rank	Nation	Swimmers	Points	Rank	Points	Rank
1st place, gold medalist(s)	Russia	Mayya Gurbanberdieva; Aleksandr Maltsev	91.5878	1	92.0749	1
2nd place, silver medalist(s)	Italy	Manila Flamini; Giorgio Minisini	90.3829	2	90.8511	2
3rd place, bronze medalist(s)	Japan	Yumi Adachi; Atsushi Abe	88.2948	3	88.5113	3
4	United States	Natalia Vega; Bill May	86.3969	4	86.9235	4
5	China	Zhang Yayi; Shi Haoyu	85.2740	5	85.5881	5
6	Spain	Emma García; Pau Ribes	83.7049	6	84.4015	6
7	Brazil	Giovana Stephan; Renan Souza	78.1404	7	79.4495	7
8	Colombia	Jennifer Cerquera; Gustavo Sánchez	76.1453	8	77.5388	8
9	Kazakhstan	Aigerim Issayeva; Olzhas Makhanbetiyarov	71.7055	9	72.2398	9
