= France at the 2019 World Aquatics Championships =

- Flag of France
- World Aquatics code: FRA
- National federation: French Swimming Federation
- Website: ffnatation.fr (in French)

in Gwangju, South Korea
- Medals Ranked 12th: Gold 1 Silver 3 Bronze 3 Total 7

World Aquatics Championships appearances
- 1973; 1975; 1978; 1982; 1986; 1991; 1994; 1998; 2001; 2003; 2005; 2007; 2009; 2011; 2013; 2015; 2017; 2019; 2022; 2023; 2024; 2025

France competed at the 2019 World Aquatics Championships in Gwangju, South Korea from 12 to 28 July.

== Medalists ==
Medal	Name	Sport	Event	Date
Gold	Axel Reymond	Open water swimming	Men's 25 km	19 July
Silver	Logan Fontaine	Open water swimming	Men's 5 km	13 July
Silver	Marc-Antoine Olivier	Open water swimming	Men's 10 km	16 July
Silver	Aurélie Muller	Open water swimming	Women's 5 km	17 July
Bronze	Lara Grangeon	Open water swimming	Women's 25 km	19 July
Bronze	David Aubry	Swimming	Men's 800 metre freestyle	24 July
Bronze	Clément Mignon; Mehdy Metella; Charlotte Bonnet; Marie Wattel; Maxime Grousset*; Béryl Gastaldello*	Swimming	Mixed 4×100 m freestyle relay	27 July

== Artistic swimming ==
France's artistic swimming team consisted of 12 athletes (12 female).

Women

Athlete	Event	Preliminaries		Final	
Athlete	Event	Points	Rank	Points	Rank
Eve Planeix	Solo free routine	86.4667	9 Q	86.6667	9
Charlotte Tremble; Laura Tremble	Duet technical routine	85.7983	9 Q	86.2420	10
Charlotte Tremble; Laura Tremble	Duet free routine	86.7333	10 Q	88.0000	8
Marie Annequin; Ambre Esnault; Inesse Guermoud; Maureen Jenkins; Solene Lusseau; Eve Planeix; Charlotte Tremble; Laura Tremble; Laura Auge (R); Manon Disbeaux (R)	Team technical routine	85.5793	9 Q	86.6543	9
Marie Annequin; Camille Bravard; Manon Disbeaux; Ambre Esnault; Laura Gonzalez; Maureen Jenkins; Solene Lusseau; Eve Planeix; Laura Auge (R); Inesse Guermoud (R)	Team free routine	87.3000	9 Q	87.4667	9
Marie Annequin; Manon Disbeaux; Ambre Esnault; Laura Gonzalez; Inesse Guermoud; Maureen Jenkins; Solene Lusseau; Eve Planeix; Charlotte Tremble; Laura Tremble; Laura Auge (R); Camille Bravard (R)	Highlight routine	—N/a		87.2000	5

Legend: (R) = Reserve Athlete

== Diving ==
France has entered four divers.

Men

Athlete	Event	Preliminaries		Semifinals		Final	
Athlete	Event	Points	Rank	Points	Rank	Points	Rank
Gwendal Bisch	1 m springboard	331.35	16	—N/a		Did not advance	
Gwendal Bisch	3 m springboard	341.45	39	Did not advance			
Alexis Jandard	1 m springboard	292.15	32	—N/a		Did not advance	
Alexis Jandard	3 m springboard	376.90	26	Did not advance			
Benjamin Auffret	10 m platform	473.70	6 Q	469.20	8 Q	489.20	5
Gwendal Bisch; Alexis Jandard	3 m synchronized springboard	344.16	13	—N/a		Did not advance	

Women

Athlete	Event	Preliminaries		Semifinals		Final	
Athlete	Event	Points	Rank	Points	Rank	Points	Rank
Alais Kalonji	10 m platform	252.60	26	Did not advance			

== Open water swimming ==
France qualified five male and four female open water swimmers.

Men

Athlete	Event	Time	Rank
David Aubry	Men's 10 km	1:48:05.1	10
Logan Fontaine	Men's 5 km	53:32.2	2nd place, silver medalist(s)
Damien Joly	Men's 5 km	53:40.2	15
Marc-Antoine Olivier	Men's 10 km	1:47:56.1	2nd place, silver medalist(s)
Marc-Antoine Olivier	Men's 25 km	DNF	
Axel Reymond	Men's 25 km	4:51:06.2	1st place, gold medalist(s)

Women

Athlete	Event	Time	Rank
Lara Grangeon	Women's 5 km	58:01.5	9
Lara Grangeon	Women's 10 km	1:54:50.0	4
Lara Grangeon	Women's 25 km	5:08:21.2	3rd place, bronze medalist(s)
Aurélie Muller	Women's 5 km	57:57.0	2nd place, silver medalist(s)
Aurélie Muller	Women's 10 km	1:54:51.2	11
Lisa Pou	Women's 25 km	5:08:28.4	4

Mixed

Athlete	Event	Time	Rank
David Aubry; Oceane Cassignol; Aurélie Muller; Marc-Antoine Olivier	Team	54:37.1	6

== Swimming ==
France has entered 11 swimmers.

Men

Athlete	Event	Heat		Semifinal		Final	
Athlete	Event	Time	Rank	Time	Rank	Time	Rank
David Aubry	800 m freestyle	7:46.37	2 Q	—N/a		7:42.08 NR	3rd place, bronze medalist(s)
David Aubry	1500 m freestyle	14:53.38	7 Q	—N/a		14:44.72	4
Maxime Grousset	50 m freestyle	22.12	14 Q	21.86	9	Did not advance	
Maxime Grousset	50 m butterfly	23.36	10 Q	23.41	14	Did not advance	
Damien Joly	800 m freestyle	7:50.30	12	—N/a		Did not advance	
Damien Joly	1500 m freestyle	14:55.51	9	—N/a		Did not advance	
Mehdy Metella	100 m freestyle	48.71	13 Q	48.65	14	Did not advance	
Mehdy Metella	100 m butterfly	51.65	5 Q	51.62	6 Q	51.38	5
Clément Mignon	50 m freestyle	DNS		Did not advance			
Clément Mignon	100 m freestyle	48.20	4 Q	48.25	6 Q	48.43	7
Jérémy Stravius	50 m backstroke	24.78	3 Q	24.98	11	Did not advance	
Clément Mignon; Jérémy Stravius; Tom Paco Pedroni; Mehdy Metella	4×100 m freestyle relay	3:13.04	7 Q	—N/a		3:13.34	8

Women

Athlete	Event	Heat		Semifinal		Final	
Athlete	Event	Time	Rank	Time	Rank	Time	Rank
Charlotte Bonnet	50 m freestyle	DNS		Did not advance			
Charlotte Bonnet	100 m freestyle	53.67	8 Q	53.62	12	Did not advance	
Charlotte Bonnet	200 m freestyle	1:58.21	13 Q	1:56.19	6 Q	1:56.95	7
Béryl Gastaldello	100 m freestyle	53.95	13 Q	54.31	15	Did not advance	
Béryl Gastaldello	100 m backstroke	1:01.45	28	Did not advance			
Béryl Gastaldello	100 m butterfly	58.83	20	Did not advance			
Fantine Lesaffre	200 m individual medley	2:12.34	13 Q	2:12.18	13	Did not advance	
Fantine Lesaffre	400 m individual medley	4:38.40	6 Q	—N/a		4:39.68	8
Marie Wattel	50 m butterfly	26.07	8 Q	25.56	3 Q	25.50	5
Marie Wattel	100 m butterfly	57.23	6 Q	57.00	3 Q	57.29	8

Mixed

Athlete	Event	Heat		Final	
Athlete	Event	Time	Rank	Time	Rank
Clément Mignon; Mehdy Metella; Charlotte Bonnet; Marie Wattel; Maxime Grousset*; Béryl Gastaldello*	4×100 m freestyle relay	3:24.27	4 Q	3:22.11	3rd place, bronze medalist(s)

Legend: (*) = Swimmers who participated in the heat only.
