= Hungary at the 2019 World Aquatics Championships =

- Flag of Hungary
- FINA code: HUN
- National federation: Hungarian Swimming Federation
- Website: www.musz.hu (in Hungarian)

in Gwangju, South Korea
- Competitors: 67 in 4 sports
- Medals Ranked 5th: Gold 5 Silver 0 Bronze 0 Total 5

World Aquatics Championships appearances (overview)
- 1973; 1975; 1978; 1982; 1986; 1991; 1994; 1998; 2001; 2003; 2005; 2007; 2009; 2011; 2013; 2015; 2017; 2019; 2022; 2023; 2024

Hungary competed at the 2019 World Aquatics Championships in Gwangju, South Korea from 12 to 28 July.

== Medalists ==
Medal	Name	Sport	Event	Date
Gold	Kristóf Rasovszky	Open water swimming	Men's 5 km	July 13
Gold	Katinka Hosszú	Swimming	Women's 200 m individual medley	July 22
Gold	Kristóf Milák	Swimming	Men's 200 m butterfly	July 24
Gold	Boglárka Kapás	Swimming	Women's 200 m butterfly	July 25
Gold	Katinka Hosszú	Swimming	Women's 400 m individual medley	July 28

== Artistic swimming ==
Hungary's artistic swimming team consisted of 12 athletes (12 female).

Women

Athlete	Event	Preliminaries		Final	
Athlete	Event	Points	Rank	Points	Rank
Janka Dávid; Boglárka Gács; Szabina Kassai (R)	Duet technical routine	75.8968	29	Did not advance	
Janka Dávid; Boglárka Gács; Szabina Kassai (R)	Duet free routine	76.0333	28	Did not advance	
Anna Apáthy; Janka Dávid; Dóra Farkas; Boglárka Gács; Szabina Hungler; Kamilla Kassai; Anna Szabó; Virág Teravágimov; Lilien Götz (R); Lili Péntek (R)	Team technical routine	75.6005	18	Did not advance	
Anna Apáthy; Janka Dávid; Dóra Farkas; Boglárka Gács; Szabina Hungler; Kamilla Kassai; Anna Szabó; Virág Teravágimov; Alice di Franco (R); Mira Gerstenkorn (R)	Team free routine	76.8667	19	Did not advance	
Anna Apáthy; Janka Dávid; Alice di Franco; Dóra Farkas; Boglárka Gács; Lilien Götz; Szabina Hungler; Kamilla Kassai; Anna Szabó; Virág Teravágimov; Mira Gerstenkorn (R); Lili Péntek (R)	Highlight routine	—		77.5667	7
Anna Apáthy; Janka Dávid; Dóra Farkas; Boglárka Gács; Mira Gerstenkorn; Szabina Hungler; Kamilla Kassai; Lili Péntek; Anna Szabó; Virág Teravágimov; Alice di Franco (R); Lilien Götz (R)	Free routine combination	77.4000	12 Q	77.9333	12

Legend: (R) = Reserve Athlete

== Open water swimming ==
Hungary qualified three male and three female open water swimmers.

Men

Athlete	Event	Time	Rank
Gergely Gyurta	25 km	4:52:57.5	10
Kristóf Rasovszky	5 km	53:22.1	1st place, gold medalist(s)
Kristóf Rasovszky	10 km	1:47:59.5	4
Kristóf Rasovszky	25 km	DNF	
Dániel Székelyi	5 km	53:34.4	6
Dániel Székelyi	10 km	1:50:11.3	27

Women

Athlete	Event	Time	Rank
Anna Olasz	5 km	58:12.2	17
Anna Olasz	10 km	1:54:58.7	16
Anna Olasz	25 km	5:11:51.5	6
Réka Rohács	5 km	58:14.8	18
Réka Rohács	10 km	1:55:26.7	=22
Onon Sömenek	25 km	5:11:54.7	8

Mixed

Athlete	Event	Time	Rank
Réka Rohács; Gergely Gyurta; Anna Olasz; Kristóf Rasovszky	Team	55:02.7	8

== Swimming ==
Hungary's swimming team consisted of 24 athletes (15 male and 9 female).

Men

Athlete	Event	Heat		Semifinal		Final	
Athlete	Event	Time	Rank	Time	Rank	Time	Rank
Gábor Balog	50 m backstroke	25.29	18	Did not advance			
Péter Bernek	200 m individual medley	2:02.56	31	Did not advance			
Péter Bernek	400 m individual medley	4:15.49	9 QR	—		4:13.83	5
Richárd Bohus	50 m backstroke	25.12	14 Q	24.88	10	Did not advance	
Richárd Bohus	100 m backstroke	54.07	18 Q	53.94	15	Did not advance	
László Cseh	50 m butterfly	23.94	32	Did not advance			
László Cseh	100 m butterfly	51.88	7 Q	51.86	10	Did not advance	
László Cseh	200 m individual medley	1:57.79	1 Q	1:58.17	10	Did not advance	
Gergely Gyurta	1500 m freestyle	15:14.20	20	—		Did not advance	
Dávid Horváth	100 m breaststroke	1:02.38	46	Did not advance			
Dávid Horváth	200 m breaststroke	2:12.83	29	Did not advance			
Ákos Kalmár	800 m freestyle	7:54.55	19	—		Did not advance	
Ákos Kalmár	1500 m freestyle	15:00.99	12	—		Did not advance	
Tamás Kenderesi	200 m butterfly	1:56.82	11 Q	1:56.25; SO: 1:59.39	8 Q	1:57.10	8
Dominik Kozma	200 m freestyle	1:46.55	8 Q	1:45.57	6 Q	1:45.90	7
Maxim Lobanovszkij	50 m freestyle	22.11	13 Q	21.89	11	Did not advance	
Nándor Németh	50 m freestyle	22.51	30	Did not advance			
Nándor Németh	100 m freestyle	48.36	6 Q	48.29	7 Q	48.10 NR	6
Kristóf Milák	100 m butterfly	51.42	2 Q	50.95	3 Q	51.26	4
Kristóf Milák	200 m butterfly	1:54.19	1 Q	1:52.96	1 Q	1:50.73 WR	1st place, gold medalist(s)
Szebasztián Szabó	50 m butterfly	23.07	4 Q	23.09	6 Q	22.90	5
Ádám Telegdy	200 m backstroke	1:57.20	6 Q	1:57.07	6 Q	1:56.86	7
Dávid Verrasztó	400 m individual medley	4:16.95	13	—		Did not advance	
Dominik Kozma; Kristóf Milák; Péter Holoda; Nándor Németh; Richárd Bohus*; Szebasztián Szabó*	4×100 m freestyle relay	3:13.90	8 Q	—		3:12.85	7
Dominik Kozma; Péter Bernek; Ákos Kalmár; Nándor Németh	4×200 m freestyle relay	7:13.64	15	—		Did not advance	
Richárd Bohus; Dávid Horváth; Sebastian Sabo; Nándor Németh	4×100 m medley relay	3:35.11	12	—		Did not advance	

Women

Athlete	Event	Heat		Semifinal		Final	
Athlete	Event	Time	Rank	Time	Rank	Time	Rank
Beatrix Bordás	50 m butterfly	26.98	29	Did not advance			
Katalin Burián	50 m backstroke	28.84	24	Did not advance			
Katalin Burián	100 m backstroke	1:01.22	23	Did not advance			
Katalin Burián	200 m backstroke	2:09.70	7 Q	2:09.40	8 Q	2:08.65	7
Katinka Hosszú	200 m freestyle	1:59.44	17	Did not advance			
Katinka Hosszú	100 m backstroke	DNS		Did not advance			
Katinka Hosszú	200 m backstroke	2:08.34	2 Q	2:07.48	5 Q	2:10.08	8
Katinka Hosszú	200 m individual medley	2:07.02	1 Q	2:07.17	1 Q	2:07.53	1st place, gold medalist(s)
Katinka Hosszú	400 m individual medley	4:35.40	1 Q	—		4:30.39	1st place, gold medalist(s)
Zsuzsanna Jakabos	200 m individual medley	2:13.29	17	Did not advance			
Zsuzsanna Jakabos	400 m individual medley	4:38.93	8 Q	—		4:39.15	7
Boglárka Kapás	400 m freestyle	4:07.05	7 Q	—		4:05.36	6
Boglárka Kapás	800 m freestyle	8:50.13	27	—		Did not advance	
Boglárka Kapás	200 m butterfly	2:07.60	2 Q	2:07.33	3 Q	2:06.78	1st place, gold medalist(s)
Ajna Késely	400 m freestyle	4:03.51	3 Q	—		4:01.31 NR	4
Ajna Késely	800 m freestyle	8:32.34	10	—		Did not advance	
Ajna Késely	1500 m freestyle	15:54.48	4 Q	—		16:01.35	6
Liliána Szilágyi	100 m butterfly	59.32	26	Did not advance			
Liliána Szilágyi	200 m butterfly	2:08.16	3 Q	2:07.83	4 Q	2:07.68	6
Anna Sztankovics	50 m breaststroke	31.13	12 Q	31.41	12	Did not advance	
Anna Sztankovics	100 m breaststroke	1:08.64	=22	Did not advance			
Evelyn Verrasztó	100 m freestyle	DNS		Did not advance			
Ajna Késely; Evelyn Verrasztó; Zsuzsanna Jakabos; Katinka Hosszú	4×200 m freestyle relay	7:55.40	7 Q	—		7:54.57	6
Katalin Burián; Anna Sztankovics; Liliána Szilágyi; Evelyn Verrasztó	4×100 m medley relay	4:05.61	19	—		Did not advance	

Mixed

Athlete	Event	Heat		Final	
Athlete	Event	Time	Rank	Time	Rank
Richárd Bohus; Anna Sztankovics; Szebasztián Szabó; Katinka Hosszú	4×100 m medley relay	3:48.44	12	Did not advance	

Legend: (*) = Swimmers who participated in the heats only.

== Water polo ==
=== Men's tournament ===
Team roster

- Viktor Nagy
- Dániel Angyal
- Bence Bátori
- Balázs Hárai
- Szilárd Jansik
- Tamás Mezei
- Krisztián Manhercz
- Zoltán Pohl
- Tamás Sedlmayer
- Dénes Varga (C)
- Márton Vámos
- Gergő Zalánki
- Soma Vogel
- Coach: Tamás Märcz

Group C

Pos	Team	Pld	W	D	L	GF	GA	GD	Pts	Qualification
1	Hungary	3	3	0	0	60	20	+40	6	Quarterfinals
2	Spain	3	2	0	1	57	19	+38	4	Playoffs
3	South Africa	3	0	1	2	16	54	−38	1	Playoffs
4	New Zealand	3	0	1	2	15	55	−40	1	

Source: Sportresult
Rules for classification: 1) points; 2) head-to-head points; 3) head-to-head goal difference; 4) head-to-head number of goals scored; 5) Goal difference.

15 July 2019; 17:50	Report	New Zealand	4–24	Hungary	Nambu University Aquatics Center, Gwangju; Referees: An Jin-yong (KOR), Dion Willis (RSA)
15 July 2019; 17:50	Report	Score by quarters: 0–4, 1–7, 2–6, 1–7			Nambu University Aquatics Center, Gwangju; Referees: An Jin-yong (KOR), Dion Willis (RSA)
15 July 2019; 17:50	Report	four players	Goals	Zalánki 4	Nambu University Aquatics Center, Gwangju; Referees: An Jin-yong (KOR), Dion Willis (RSA)

17 July 2019; 11:10	Report	Hungary	13–11	Spain	Nambu University Aquatics Center, Gwangju; Referees: Boris Margenta (SLO), Michael Goldenberg (USA)
17 July 2019; 11:10	Report	Score by quarters: 4–2, 5–4, 3–0, 1–5			Nambu University Aquatics Center, Gwangju; Referees: Boris Margenta (SLO), Michael Goldenberg (USA)
17 July 2019; 11:10	Report	Zalánki 3	Goals	Granados 3	Nambu University Aquatics Center, Gwangju; Referees: Boris Margenta (SLO), Michael Goldenberg (USA)

19 July 2019; 08:30	Report	South Africa	5–23	Hungary	Nambu University Aquatics Center, Gwangju; Referees: Michael Goldenberg (USA), An Jin-yong (KOR)
19 July 2019; 08:30	Report	Score by quarters: 1–5, 2–5, 0–8, 2–5			Nambu University Aquatics Center, Gwangju; Referees: Michael Goldenberg (USA), An Jin-yong (KOR)
19 July 2019; 08:30	Report	Badenhorst 2	Goals	Zalánki 5	Nambu University Aquatics Center, Gwangju; Referees: Michael Goldenberg (USA), An Jin-yong (KOR)

Quarterfinals

23 July 2019; 17:00	Report	Hungary	10–9	Australia	Nambu University Aquatics Center, Gwangju; Referees: Arkadiy Voevodin (RUS), Vojin Putniković (SRB)
23 July 2019; 17:00	Report	Score by quarters: 3–3, 2–3, 3–1, 2–2			Nambu University Aquatics Center, Gwangju; Referees: Arkadiy Voevodin (RUS), Vojin Putniković (SRB)
23 July 2019; 17:00	Report	Vámos, Zalánki 3	Goals	four players 2	Nambu University Aquatics Center, Gwangju; Referees: Arkadiy Voevodin (RUS), Vojin Putniković (SRB)

Semifinals

25 July 2019; 18:30	Report	Hungary	10–12	Italy	Nambu University Aquatics Center, Gwangju; Referees: Michiel Zwart (NED), Boris Margeta (SLO)
25 July 2019; 18:30	Report	Score by quarters: 4–2, 1-5, 2-2, 3-3			Nambu University Aquatics Center, Gwangju; Referees: Michiel Zwart (NED), Boris Margeta (SLO)
25 July 2019; 18:30	Report	three players 2	Goals	Echenique 4	Nambu University Aquatics Center, Gwangju; Referees: Michiel Zwart (NED), Boris Margeta (SLO)

Third place game

27 July 2019; 17:00	Report	Croatia	10–7	Hungary	Nambu University Aquatics Center, Gwangju; Referees: Adrian Alexandrescu (ROU), Georgios Stavridis (GRE)
27 July 2019; 17:00	Report	Score by quarters: 2–1, 2–2, 2–2, 4–2			Nambu University Aquatics Center, Gwangju; Referees: Adrian Alexandrescu (ROU), Georgios Stavridis (GRE)
27 July 2019; 17:00	Report	Joković 6	Goals	Hárai, Manhercz 2	Nambu University Aquatics Center, Gwangju; Referees: Adrian Alexandrescu (ROU), Georgios Stavridis (GRE)

=== Women's tournament ===
Team roster

- Edina Gangl
- Dóra Csabai
- Gréta Gurisatti
- Anikó Gyöngyössy
- Brigitta Horváth
- Anna Illés
- Rita Keszthelyi (C)
- Dóra Leimeter
- Alda Magyari
- Natasa Rybanska
- Rebecca Parkes
- Dorottya Szilágyi
- Vanda Vályi
- Coach: Attila Bíró

Group B

Pos	Team	Pld	W	D	L	GF	GA	GD	Pts	Qualification
1	Russia	3	3	0	0	65	23	+42	6	Quarterfinals
2	Hungary	3	2	0	1	91	31	+60	4	Playoffs
3	Canada	3	1	0	2	46	35	+11	2	Playoffs
4	South Korea (H)	3	0	0	3	3	116	−113	0	

Source: Sportresult
Rules for classification: 1) points; 2) head-to-head points; 3) head-to-head goal difference; 4) head-to-head number of goals scored; 5) Goal difference.
(H) Hosts

14 July 2019; 12:30	Report	Hungary	64–0	South Korea	Nambu University Aquatics Center, Gwangju; Referees: Jeremy Cheng (SIN), John Waldow (NZL)
14 July 2019; 12:30	Report	Score by quarters: 16–0, 18–0, 16–0, 14–0			Nambu University Aquatics Center, Gwangju; Referees: Jeremy Cheng (SIN), John Waldow (NZL)
14 July 2019; 12:30	Report	Parkes 11	Goals		Nambu University Aquatics Center, Gwangju; Referees: Jeremy Cheng (SIN), John Waldow (NZL)

16 July 2019; 09:50	Report	Canada	14–15	Hungary	Nambu University Aquatics Center, Gwangju; Referees: Nenad Peris (CRO), Georgios Stavridis (GRE)
16 July 2019; 09:50	Report	Score by quarters: 2–3, 4–5, 3–5, 5–2			Nambu University Aquatics Center, Gwangju; Referees: Nenad Peris (CRO), Georgios Stavridis (GRE)
16 July 2019; 09:50	Report	E. Wright, Fournier 3	Goals	Keszthelyi 7	Nambu University Aquatics Center, Gwangju; Referees: Nenad Peris (CRO), Georgios Stavridis (GRE)

18 July 2019; 20:30	Report	Hungary	12–17	Russia	Nambu University Aquatics Center, Gwangju; Referees: Vojin Putniković (SRB), Georgios Stavridis (GRE)
18 July 2019; 20:30	Report	Score by quarters: 4–6, 3–5, 1–2, 4–4			Nambu University Aquatics Center, Gwangju; Referees: Vojin Putniković (SRB), Georgios Stavridis (GRE)
18 July 2019; 20:30	Report	Vályi 4	Goals	Bersneva 4	Nambu University Aquatics Center, Gwangju; Referees: Vojin Putniković (SRB), Georgios Stavridis (GRE)

Playoffs

20 July 2019; 15:30	Report	New Zealand	6–17	Hungary	Nambu University Aquatics Center, Gwangju; Referees: Natacha Florestano (BRA), Juan Menéndez (CUB)
20 July 2019; 15:30	Report	Score by quarters: 2–4, 1–4, 1–4, 2–5			Nambu University Aquatics Center, Gwangju; Referees: Natacha Florestano (BRA), Juan Menéndez (CUB)
20 July 2019; 15:30	Report	Houghton, McDowall 2	Goals	Keszthelyi 4	Nambu University Aquatics Center, Gwangju; Referees: Natacha Florestano (BRA), Juan Menéndez (CUB)

Quarterfinals

22 July 2019; 18:30	Report	Italy	6–7	Hungary	Nambu University Aquatics Center, Gwangju; Referees: Boris Margeta (SLO), Vojin Putniković (SRB)
22 July 2019; 18:30	Report	Score by quarters: 2–4, 2–1, 1–1, 1–1			Nambu University Aquatics Center, Gwangju; Referees: Boris Margeta (SLO), Vojin Putniković (SRB)
22 July 2019; 18:30	Report	six players 1	Goals	Gurisatti, Leimeter 2	Nambu University Aquatics Center, Gwangju; Referees: Boris Margeta (SLO), Vojin Putniković (SRB)

Semifinals

24 July 2019; 18:30	Report	Spain	16–10	Hungary	Nambu University Aquatics Center, Gwangju; Referees: Georgios Stavridis (GRE), Boris Margeta (SLO)
24 July 2019; 18:30	Report	Score by quarters: 5–3, 5–5, 4–1, 2–1			Nambu University Aquatics Center, Gwangju; Referees: Georgios Stavridis (GRE), Boris Margeta (SLO)
24 July 2019; 18:30	Report	Tarragó, Forca 4	Goals	Leimeter 4	Nambu University Aquatics Center, Gwangju; Referees: Georgios Stavridis (GRE), Boris Margeta (SLO)

Bronze Medal match

26 July 2019; 17:00	Report	Australia	10–9	Hungary	Nambu University Aquatics Center, Gwangju; Referees: Marie-Claude Deslieres (CAN), Jaume Teixidó (ESP)
26 July 2019; 17:00	Report	Score by quarters: 3–3, 4–3, 1–1, 2–2			Nambu University Aquatics Center, Gwangju; Referees: Marie-Claude Deslieres (CAN), Jaume Teixidó (ESP)
26 July 2019; 17:00	Report	Arancini 3	Goals	Keszthelyi 3	Nambu University Aquatics Center, Gwangju; Referees: Marie-Claude Deslieres (CAN), Jaume Teixidó (ESP)
