= Swimming at the 2019 World Aquatics Championships – Men's 100 metre breaststroke =

Men's 100 metre breaststroke at the 2019 World Aquatics Championships
- Venue: Nambu University Municipal Aquatics Center
- Location: Gwangju, South Korea
- Dates: 21 July (heats and semifinals); 22 July (final)
- Competitors: 87 from 80 nations
- Winning time: 57.14

Medalists
gold medal	Adam Peaty	Great Britain
silver medal	James Wilby	Great Britain
bronze medal	Yan Zibei	China

The Men's 100 metre breaststroke competition at the 2019 World Championships was held on 21 and 22 July 2019. Adam Peaty broke the world record with a time of 56.88 in the semi-final, the first man to swim under 57 seconds in this event, and went on to win in the final.

== Records ==
Prior to the competition, the existing world and championship records were as follows.

World record	Adam Peaty (GBR)	57.10	Glasgow, United Kingdom	4 August 2018
Competition record	Adam Peaty (GBR)	57.47	Budapest, Hungary	24 July 2017

The following new records were set during this competition.

Date	Event	Name	Nationality	Time	Record
21 July	Semifinal	Adam Peaty	Great Britain	56.88	WR

== Results ==
=== Heats ===
The heats were held on 21 July at 11:54.

Rank	Heat	Lane	Name	Nationality	Time	Notes
1	9	4	Adam Peaty	Great Britain	57.59	Q
2	8	4	Ilya Shymanovich	Belarus	58.87	Q
3	9	5	Yasuhiro Koseki	Japan	58.91	Q
4	8	5	Yan Zibei	China	59.13	Q
5	7	4	James Wilby	Great Britain	59.15	Q
6	9	1	Matthew Wilson	Australia	59.17	Q
7	9	7	João Gomes Júnior	Brazil	59.25	Q
8	9	6	Andrew Wilson	United States	59.26	Q
9	9	3	Anton Chupkov	Russia	59.31	Q
10	8	6	Kirill Prigoda	Russia	59.32	Q
11	8	3	Arno Kamminga	Netherlands	59.39	Q
12	8	1	Wang Lizhuo	China	59.44	Q
13	8	2	Dmitriy Balandin	Kazakhstan	59.56	Q
14	7	6	Nicolò Martinenghi	Italy	59.58	Q
15	7	5	Fabio Scozzoli	Italy	59.61	Q
16	7	7	Andrius Šidlauskas	Lithuania	59.75	Q
17	8	8	Darragh Greene	Ireland	59.82	NR
18	8	7	Felipe Lima	Brazil	1:00.00	
19	9	2	Michael Andrew	United States	1:00.04	
20	7	1	Fabian Schwingenschlögl	Germany	1:00.12	
21	9	8	Giedrius Titenis	Lithuania	1:00.20	
22	7	2	Berkay-Ömer Öğretir	Turkey	1:00.26	
23	7	3	Tobias Bjerg	Denmark	1:00.29	
24	7	0	Anton Sveinn McKee	Iceland	1:00.32	NR
25	7	9	Martin Allikvee	Estonia	1:00.60	
26	8	9	Erik Persson	Sweden	1:00.66	
27	8	0	Richard Funk	Canada	1:00.73	
28	5	2	Denis Petrashov	Kyrgyzstan	1:00.94	NR
29	6	8	Nikola Obrovac	Croatia	1:01.18	NR
29	9	0	Michael Houlie	South Africa	1:01.18	
31	6	6	Youssef El-Kamash	Egypt	1:01.24	
31	7	8	Moon Jae-kwon	South Korea	1:01.24	
33	9	9	Jorge Murillo	Colombia	1:01.45	
34	6	9	Jan Kałusowski	Poland	1:01.49	
35	6	4	Tomáš Klobučník	Slovakia	1:01.65	
36	6	5	Valentin Bayer	Austria	1:01.68	
37	5	6	Itay Goldfaden	Israel	1:01.69	
38	6	2	Yannick Käser	Switzerland	1:01.85	
39	5	3	Peter John Stevens	Slovenia	1:01.90	
40	5	0	Lyubomir Epitropov	Bulgaria	1:02.04	
41	5	9	Chao Man Hou	Macau	1:02.14	NR
42	6	7	Chen Chih-ming	Chinese Taipei	1:02.18	
43	4	5	Martin Melconian	Uruguay	1:02.21	NR
44	5	5	Renato Prono	Paraguay	1:02.28	
45	5	1	Miguel Chávez	Mexico	1:02.37	
46	6	0	Dávid Horváth	Hungary	1:02.38	
47	6	3	Vladislav Mustafin	Uzbekistan	1:02.48	
48	5	4	Édgar Crespo	Panama	1:02.62	
49	5	7	Lionel Khoo	Singapore	1:02.66	
50	4	6	Amro Al-Wir	Jordan	1:02.75	NR
51	4	4	James Deiparine	Philippines	1:02.84	
52	5	8	S.P. Likhith	India	1:02.90	
53	4	9	Adriel Sanes	Virgin Islands	1:02.91	NR
54	4	3	Taichi Vakasama	Fiji	1:03.18	
55	4	7	Daniils Bobrovs	Latvia	1:03.32	
56	6	1	Mykyta Koptyelov	Ukraine	1:03.47	
57	4	8	Julio Horrego	Honduras	1:03.55	
58	4	2	Izaak Bastian	Bahamas	1:03.60	
59	4	0	Sebastien Kouma	Mali	1:04.03	
60	3	3	Adrian Robinson	Botswana	1:04.26	NR
61	1	7	Benjamin Schulte	Guam	1:04.40	
62	3	8	Ryan Maskelyne	Papua New Guinea	1:04.44	
63	4	1	Fausto Huerta	Dominican Republic	1:04.65	
64	3	4	Yu Hin Michael Ng	Hong Kong	1:04.66	
65	3	6	Tasi Limtiaco	Federated States of Micronesia	1:05.10	
66	3	7	Ronan Wantenaar	Namibia	1:05.17	
67	3	9	Micah Masei	American Samoa	1:05.24	
68	3	1	Liam Davis	Zimbabwe	1:05.39	
69	3	0	Giacomo Casadei	San Marino	1:05.96	NR
70	1	2	Rashed Al-Tarmoom	Kuwait	1:06.35	
71	2	2	Rainier Rafaela	Curaçao	1:06.41	
72	3	2	Arnoldo Herrera	Costa Rica	1:06.42	
73	3	5	Santiago Cavanagh	Bolivia	1:06.44	
74	1	1	Muhammad Isa Ahmad	Brunei	1:06.51	
75	1	6	Jonathan Raharvel	Madagascar	1:06.53	
76	2	6	Malcolm Richardson	Cook Islands	1:06.64	
77	2	5	Filipe Gomes	Malawi	1:07.51	
78	2	4	Mohammad Islam	Bangladesh	1:07.74	
79	2	3	Günsennorovyn Zandanbal	Mongolia	1:07.92	
80	2	1	Alex Joachim	Saint Vincent and the Grenadines	1:08.14	
81	1	5	Amini Fonua	Tonga	1:08.32	
82	2	7	Abobakr Abass	Sudan	1:09.34	
83	2	0	Kumaren Naidu	Zambia	1:10.13	
84	2	8	Shuvam Shrestha	Nepal	1:11.74	
85	1	3	Yaya Yeressa	Guinea	1:19.66	
86	1	4	Lennosuke Suzuki	Northern Mariana Islands	1:20.97	
87	2	9	Gildas Koumondji	Benin	1:26.57	

=== Semifinals ===
The semifinals were held on 21 July at 20:51.

==== Semifinal 1 ====
Rank	Lane	Name	Nationality	Time	Notes
1	5	Yan Zibei	China	58.67	Q, AS
2	6	Andrew Wilson	United States	58.95	Q
3	2	Kirill Prigoda	Russia	59.21	Q
4	3	Matthew Wilson	Australia	59.26	
5	4	Ilya Shymanovich	Belarus	59.38	
6	8	Andrius Šidlauskas	Lithuania	59.66	
7	7	Wang Lizhuo	China	59.79	
	1	Nicolò Martinenghi	Italy	DSQ	

==== Semifinal 2 ====
Rank	Lane	Name	Nationality	Time	Notes
1	4	Adam Peaty	Great Britain	56.88	Q, WR
2	3	James Wilby	Great Britain	58.83	Q
3	5	Yasuhiro Koseki	Japan	58.89	Q
4	1	Dmitriy Balandin	Kazakhstan	59.03	Q, NR
5	2	Anton Chupkov	Russia	59.15	Q
6	8	Fabio Scozzoli	Italy	59.22	
7	6	João Gomes Júnior	Brazil	59.32	
8	7	Arno Kamminga	Netherlands	59.49	

=== Final ===
The final was held on 22 July at 20:02.

Rank	Lane	Name	Nationality	Time	Notes
1st place, gold medalist(s)	4	Adam Peaty	Great Britain	57.14	
2nd place, silver medalist(s)	3	James Wilby	Great Britain	58.46	
3rd place, bronze medalist(s)	5	Yan Zibei	China	58.63	AS
4	6	Yasuhiro Koseki	Japan	58.93	
5	8	Kirill Prigoda	Russia	59.09	
6	2	Andrew Wilson	United States	59.11	
7	7	Dmitriy Balandin	Kazakhstan	59.14	
8	1	Anton Chupkov	Russia	59.19	
