= Open water swimming at the 2019 World Aquatics Championships =

- Host city: Yeosu, South Korea
- Date(s): 13–19 July
- Venue(s): Yeosu Expo Ocean Park
- Events: 7

Open water swimming at the 2019 World Aquatics Championships was held from 13 to 19 July 2019.

== Schedule ==
Seven events were held.

All times are local (UTC+9).

Date	Time	Event
13 July 2019	08:00	Men's 5 km
14 July 2019	08:00	Women's 10 km
16 July 2019	08:00	Men's 10 km
17 July 2019	08:00	Women's 5 km
18 July 2019	08:00	5 km team
19 July 2019	08:00	Men's 25 km
19 July 2019	08:05	Women's 25 km

== Medal summary ==
=== Medal table ===
Rank	Nation	Gold	Silver	Bronze	Total
1	Germany	2	1	2	5
2	Brazil	2	0	0	2
3	France	1	3	1	5
4	China	1	0	0	1
4	Hungary	1	0	0	1
6	Italy	0	1	2	3
6	United States	0	1	2	3
8	Russia	0	1	0	1
9	Canada	0	0	1	1
Totals (9 entries)		7	7	8	22

=== Men ===
Event	Gold		Silver		Bronze	
5 km	Kristóf Rasovszky; Hungary	53:22.1	Logan Fontaine; France	53:32.2	Eric Hedlin; Canada	53:32.4
10 km	Florian Wellbrock; Germany	1:47:55.9	Marc-Antoine Olivier; France	1:47:56.1	Rob Muffels; Germany	1:47:57.4
25 km	Axel Reymond; France	4:51:06.2	Kirill Belyaev; Russia	4:51:06.5	Alessio Occhipinti; Italy	4:51:09.5

=== Women ===
Event	Gold		Silver		Bronze	
5 km	Ana Marcela Cunha; Brazil	57:56.0	Aurélie Muller; France	57:57.0	Hannah Moore; United States Leonie Beck; Germany	57:58.0
10 km	Xin Xin; China	1:54:47.2	Haley Anderson; United States	1:54:48.1	Rachele Bruni; Italy	1:54:49.9
25 km	Ana Marcela Cunha; Brazil	5:08:03.0	Finnia Wunram; Germany	5:08:11.6	Lara Grangeon; France	5:08:21.2

=== Team ===
Event	Gold		Silver		Bronze	
Team	Germany; Lea Boy; Sarah Köhler; Sören Meißner; Rob Muffels	53:58.7	Italy; Rachele Bruni; Giulia Gabbrielleschi; Domenico Acerenza; Gregorio Paltrinieri	53:58.9	United States; Haley Anderson; Jordan Wilimovsky; Ashley Twichell; Michael Brinegar	53:59.0
