= Finnia Wunram =

German swimmer (born 1995)

Personal information
- Nationality: German
- Born: 18 December 1995 (age 30) Eckernförde, Germany
- Height: 1.64 m (5 ft 5 in)
- Weight: 51 kg (112 lb)

Sport
- Sport: Swimming
- Strokes: Freestyle
- Club: SC Magdeburg
Medal record
World Championships
Silver medal – second place	2019 Gwangju	25 km open water

Finnia Wunram (born 18 December 1995) is a German swimmer, specialising in open water events. She competed in the women's 10 km and 25 km events at the 2019 World Aquatics Championships, winning a silver medal in the latter. She qualified to represent Germany at the 2020 Summer Olympics.
