= Abdulla Ahmed =

Bahraini swimmer (born 2002)

Personal information
- Native name: عبدالله عيسى احمد علي يوسف
- Full name: Abdulla Essa Ahmed Ali Yusuf
- Nationality: Bahrain
- Born: 20 November 2002 (age 23)

Sport
- Sport: Swimming

Abdulla Essa Ahmed Ali Yusuf (Arabic: عبدالله عيسى احمد علي يوسف; born 20 November 2002) is a Bahraini swimmer. He competed in the 2020 Summer Olympics.
