= Naoki Mizunuma =

Japanese swimmer (born 1996)

Personal information
- Nationality: Japanese
- Born: 13 December 1996 (age 29) Mooka, Japan

Sport
- Sport: Swimming
Medal record
World Championships (LC)
Silver medal – second place	2022 Budapest	100 m butterfly

Naoki Mizunuma (水沼 尚輝, Mizunuma Naoki; born 13 December 1996) is a Japanese swimmer. He competed in the men's 50 metre butterfly at the 2019 World Aquatics Championships.
