= Moldova at the 2025 World Aquatics Championships =

- Flag of Moldova
- World Aquatics code: MDA
- National federation: Water Kind of Sports Federation of the Republic of Moldova

in Singapore
- Competitors: 3 in 1 sport
- Medals: Gold 0 Silver 0 Bronze 0 Total 0

World Aquatics Championships appearances
- 1994; 1998; 2001; 2003; 2005; 2007; 2009; 2011; 2013; 2015; 2017; 2019; 2022; 2023; 2024; 2025

Other related appearances
- Soviet Union (1973–1991)

Moldova is competing at the 2025 World Aquatics Championships in Singapore from 11 July to 3 August 2025.

== Competitors ==
The following is the list of competitors in the Championships.

Sport	Men	Women	Total
Swimming	2	1	3
Total	2	1	3

== Swimming ==
Men

Athlete	Event	Heat		Semifinal		Final	
Athlete	Event	Time	Rank	Time	Rank	Time	Rank
Constantin Malachi	50 m freestyle	23.44	59	Did not advance			
Constantin Malachi	200 m breaststroke	2:17.69	32	Did not advance			
Denis Svet	50 m breaststroke	28.73	57	Did not advance			
Denis Svet	100 m breaststroke	1:04.11	54	Did not advance			

Women

Athlete	Event	Heat		Semifinal		Final	
Athlete	Event	Time	Rank	Time	Rank	Time	Rank
Natalia Zaiteva	100 m backstroke	1:04.72	40	Did not advance			
Natalia Zaiteva	200 m backstroke	2:19.38	37	Did not advance			
