= List of Moldovan records in swimming =

The Moldovan records in swimming are the fastest ever performances of swimmers from Moldova, which are recognised and ratified by the Moldovan Swimming Federation.

All records were set in finals unless noted otherwise.

== Long Course (50 m) ==
=== Men ===
Event	Time		Name	Club	Date	Meet	Location	Ref
50 m freestyle	22.96		Pavel Izbisciuc	Moldova	20 March 2016	Ukrainian Championships	Dnipropetrovsk, Ukraine	
100 m freestyle	49.01		Alexei Sancov	Moldova	30 June 2017	European Junior Championships	Netanya, Israel	
200 m freestyle	1:47.00		Alexei Sancov	Moldova	2 July 2017	European Junior Championships	Netanya, Israel	
400 m freestyle	3:53.42		Alexei Sancov	Moldova	28 July 2015	European Youth Olympic Festival	Tbilisi, Georgia	
800 m freestyle	8:06.54	h	Alexei Sancov	Moldova	20 August 2014	Youth Olympic Games	Nanjing, China	
1500 m freestyle	15:29.73		Alexei Sancov	Moldova	31 July 2015	European Youth Olympic Festival	Tbilisi, Georgia	
50 m backstroke	26.10		Chirill Chirsanov	Moldova	18 May 2025	Grand Prix Burgas	Burgas, Bulgaria	
100 m backstroke	57.10		Serghei Golban	SSG Leipzig	2 June 2010	German Junior Championships	Berlin, Germany	
100 m backstroke	56.27	not ratified	Serghei Golban	SSG Leipzig	12 June 2013	German Junior Championships	Berlin, Germany	
200m backstroke	2:03.79	h	Volodymyr Naleykin	Moldova	1 March 2012	Ukrainian Championships	Dnipropetrovsk, Ukraine	
50m breaststroke	28.18	h	Denis Svet	Moldova	21 June 2024	European Championships	Belgrade, Serbia	
100m breaststroke	1:01.60		Danila Artiomov	Moldova	4 July 2012	European Junior Championships	Antwerp, Belgium	
200m breaststroke	2:14.23	h	Danila Artiomov	Moldova	29 February 2012	Ukrainian Championships	Dnipropetrovsk, Ukraine	
50m butterfly	24.34		Pavel Izbisciuc	-	February 2017	Moldovan Winter Championships	Tiraspol, Moldova	
100m butterfly	53.18		Alexei Sancov	USC Aquatics	5 June 2021	Mare Nostrum	Barcelona, Spain	
200m butterfly	1:57.55	h	Alexei Sancov	Moldova	26 July 2021	Olympic Games	Tokyo, Japan	
200m individual medley	2:01.80		Serghei Mariniuc	-	31 March 1994	US Spring Nationals	Federal Way, United States	
400m individual medley	4:17.71		Serghei Mariniuc	-	31 March 1994	US Spring Nationals	Federal Way, United States	
4×100m freestyle relay	3:25.16			-	1988	USSR Championships	Moscow, Soviet Union	
4×200m freestyle relay	7:43.20			-	1986	Spartakiades of Peoples of USSR	Moscow, Soviet Union	
4×100m medley relay	3:50.14	h	Volodymyr Naleykin (58.25); Danila Artiomov (1:03.92); Pavel Izbisciuc (56.55); Evgheni Coroliuc (51.42)	Moldova	8 July 2012	European Junior Championships	Antwerp, Belgium	

Legend: # – Record awaiting ratification by Moldovan Swimming Federation; WR – World record; ER – European record; e – equalled existing record;
Records not set in finals: h – heat; sf – semifinal; r – relay 1st leg; rh – relay heat 1st leg; b – B final; † – en route to final mark; so – swim-off; tt – time trial

=== Women ===
Event	Time		Name	Club	Date	Meet	Location	Ref
50m freestyle	26.26		Maria Corlăteanu	Moldova	17 May 2026	Burgas Grand Prix	Burgas, Bulgaria	
100m freestyle	57.23		Giordana Artic	CC Aniene	5 August 2021	Italian Summer Championships	Rome, Italy	
200m freestyle	2:01.67	b	Giordana Artic	CC Aniene	10 April 2022	Italian Championships	Riccione, Italy	
400m freestyle	4:14.68		Giordana Artic	CC Aniene	21 July 2022	Italian Championships	Ostia, Italy	
800m freestyle	8:51.4		Oksana Komissarova	-	1982	USSR Championships	Soviet Union	
1500m freestyle	17:18.4		Alla Vakulenchik	-	1990	USSR Championships	Soviet Union	
50m backstroke	29.27	h	Tatiana Salcuțan	Moldova	18 May 2021	European Championships	Budapest, Hungary	
100m backstroke	1:01.55		Tatiana Salcuțan	Moldova	2 July 2017	European Junior Championships	Netanya, Israel	
200m backstroke	2:09.98	h	Tatiana Salcuțan	Moldova	29 July 2021	Olympic Games	Tokyo, Japan	
50m breaststroke	31.12		Tatiana Chișca	Moldova	19 April 2016	Russian Championships	Moscow, Russia	
100m breaststroke	1:09.31	h	Tatiana Chișca	Moldova	4 August 2018	European Championships	Glasgow, Great Britain	
200m breaststroke	2:26.39	sf	Anastasia Basisto	Moldova	20 May 2021	European Championships	Budapest, Hungary	
50m butterfly	28.75		Anastasia Basisto	Ss 11-1	6 March 2026	Moldovan Championships	Chisinau, Moldova	
100m butterfly	1:03.47		Tatiana Perstniova	-	2016	Moldovan Championships	Moldova	
200m butterfly	2:19.96		Tatiana Salcuțan	Moldova	7 September 2018	World Cup	Kazan, Russia	
200m individual medley	2:19.7		Nadezhda Katanova	-	1987			
400m individual medley	4:55.5		Nadezhda Katanova	-	1987			
4×50m freestyle relay	1:49.23		Maria Corlateanu (26.93); Xenia Rogovei (27.38); Sophie Cernous (27.48); Anastasia Basisto (27.44)	Moldova	15 May 2026	Burgas Grand Prix	Burgas, Bulgaria	
4×100m freestyle relay	4:00.8			-	1986	Spartakiades of Peoples of USSR	Moscow, Soviet Union	
4×200m freestyle relay	8:46.4			-	1986	Spartakiades of Peoples of USSR	Moscow, Soviet Union	
4×100m medley relay	4:18.73		Tatiana Salcuțan (1:02.39); Tatiana Chișca (1:09.13); Anastasia Moscenscaia (1:09.36); Alina Matrenitcaia (57.85)	Moldova	27 May 2018	Romanian Championships	Bucharest, Romania	

Legend: # – Record awaiting ratification by Moldovan Swimming Federation; WR – World record; ER – European record; e – equalled existing record;
Records not set in finals: h – heat; sf – semifinal; r – relay 1st leg; rh – relay heat 1st leg; b – B final; † – en route to final mark; so – swim-off; tt – time trial

=== Mixed relay ===
Event	Time		Name	Club	Date	Meet	Location	Ref
4×100 m freestyle relay	3:44.35		Dan Siminel (53.15); Tatiana Salcutan (59.58); Alina Matrenitcaia (1:00.19); Constantin Malachi (51.43)	Moldova	25 May 2018	Romanian Championships	Bucharest, Romania	
4×50 m medley relay	1:54.18		Adrian Herpu; Alina Bulmag; Tatiana Kishka; Dan Siminel	Chișinău	2019	-	Tiraspol, Moldova	
4×100 m medley relay	3:54.75	h	Tatiana Salcutan (1:02.63); Anastasia Basisto (1:08.52); Alexei Sancov (52.69); Constantin Malachi (50.91)	Moldova	20 May 2021	European Championships	Budapest, Hungary	

Legend: # – Record awaiting ratification by Moldovan Swimming Federation; WR – World record; ER – European record; e – equalled existing record;
Records not set in finals: h – heat; so – swim-off

== Short Course (25 m) ==
=== Men ===
Event	Time		Name	Club	Date	Meet	Location	Ref
50 m freestyle	22.28		Yuri Bashkatov	-	1991	World Cup		
100 m freestyle	48.85		Yuri Bashkatov	-	1991	World Cup		
200 m freestyle	1:46.06 (Note: by official result source; 1:46.05 by Moldovan Swimming Federation source, a typo)		Alexei Sancov	Moldova	22 December 2020	Vladimir Salnikov Cup	Saint Petersburg, Russia	
400 m freestyle	3:50.21		Pavel Alovatki	-	2022	-	Moldova	
800 m freestyle	8:01.80		Pavel Alovatki	-	2022	-	Moldova	
1500 m freestyle	15:23.73		Alexei Sancov	-	2015	Moldovan Championships	Moldova	
50m backstroke	24.35	h	Chirill Chirsanov	Moldova	17 October 2026	World Cup	Astana, Kazakhstan	
100m backstroke	53.27	h	Serghei Golban	SSG Leipzig	27 November 2011	German Championships	Wuppertal, Germany	
200m backstroke	2:00.06		Ivan Danco	Tssro	26 June 2026	Moldovan Championships	Chișinău, Moldova	
50m breaststroke	27.15		Constantin Malachi	Leo-L. Schiltigheim-Bischheim	29 October 2023	French Championships	Angers, France	
100m breaststroke	59.43		Constantin Malachi	Leo-L. Schiltigheim-Bischheim	28 October 2023	French Championships	Angers, France	
200m breaststroke	2:09.37		Constantin Malachi	Leo-L. Schiltigheim-Bischheim	27 October 2023	French Championships	Angers, France	
50m butterfly	23.86		Serghei Golban	SSG Leipzig	25 November 2011	German Championships	Wuppertal, Germany	
100m butterfly	52.75	h	Alexei Sancov	Moldova	22 December 2020	Vladimir Salnikov Cup	Saint Petersburg, Russia	
200m butterfly	1:55.73		Alexei Sancov	Moldova	21 December 2020	Vladimir Salnikov Cup	Saint Petersburg, Russia	
100m individual medley	55.91		Ivan Danco	Moldova	10 October 2026	International Meeting Briz	Burgas, Bulgaria	
200m individual medley	1:59.92		Serghei Mariniuc	Moldova	2 December 1993	World Championships	Palma de Mallorca, Spain	
400m individual medley	4:11.55		Serghei Mariniuc	Moldova	1996	World Cup		
4×50m freestyle relay	1:32.06	h	Dan Siminel (23.33); Constantin Malachi (22.03); Egor Covaliov (23.40); Tudor Vartic (23.30)	Moldova	5 December 2023	European Championships	Otopeni, Romania	
4×100m freestyle relay								
4×200m freestyle relay								
4×50m medley relay	1:40.38	h	Chirill Chirsanov (25.72); Constantin Malachi (27.18); Egor Covaliov (25.08); Dan Siminel (22.40)	Moldova	6 December 2023	European Championships	Otopeni, Romania	
4×100m medley relay								

Legend: # – Record awaiting ratification by Moldovan Swimming Federation; WR – World record; ER – European record; e – equalled existing record;
Records not set in finals: h – heat; sf – semifinal; r – relay 1st leg; rh – relay heat 1st leg; b – B final; † – en route to final mark; so – swim-off; tt – time trial

=== Women ===
Event	Time		Name	Club	Date	Meet	Location	Ref
50m freestyle	25.82	h	Uliana Crevenciuc	Moldova	1 October 2026	World Cup	Baku, Azerbaijan	
100m freestyle	55.86		Giordana Artic	CC Aniene	21 December 2021	1a Prova Regionale di Categoria	Frosinone, Italy	
200m freestyle	1:58.53		Giordana Artic	CC Aniene	6 March 2021	4a Prova di Qualificazione Regionale	Rome, Italy	
400m freestyle	4:07.46		Giordana Artic	CC Aniene	11 November 2022	Italian Championships	Riccione, Italy	
800m freestyle	8:33.50		Giordana Artic	CC Aniene	10 November 2022	Italian Championships	Riccione, Italy	
1500m freestyle	16:33.05		Giordana Artic	CC Aniene	22 January 2021	2a Prova Regionale di Categoria	Rome, Italy	
50m backstroke	27.98		Tatiana Salcuțan	-	2018	Moldovan Championships	Moldova	
100m backstroke	59.80		Tatiana Salcuțan	-	2018	Moldovan Championships	Moldova	
200m backstroke	2:07.63		Tatiana Salcuțan	Moldova	16 December 2016	Vladimir Salnikov Cup	Saint Petersburg, Russia	
50m breaststroke	30.57	sf	Tatiana Chișca	Moldova	4 December 2019	European Championships	Glasgow, Great Britain	
100m breaststroke	1:06.94		Tatiana Chișca	Moldova	21 December 2018	Vladimir Salnikov Cup	Saint Petersburg, Russia	
200m breaststroke	2:26.41	h	Anastasia Basisto	Moldova	21 December 2021	World Championships	Abu Dhabi, United Arab Emirates	
50m butterfly	28.19		Anastasia Basisto	Ss nr. 11	27 June 2026	Moldovan Championships	Chișinău, Moldova	
100m butterfly	1:01.58		Tatiana Perstniova	-	2015	Moldovan Championships	Moldova	
200m butterfly	2:18.57		Tatiana Salcuțan	-	2016	Moldovan Championships	Moldova	
100m individual medley	1:03.59		Mihaela Bat	-	25 February 2017	-	Turin, Italy	
200m individual medley	2:15.39	h	Alexandra Ablovatskaia	Moldova	5 December 2025	European Championships	Lublin, Poland	
400m individual medley	4:51.72	h	Alexandra Ablovatskaia	Moldova	7 December 2025	European Championships	Lublin, Poland	
4×50m freestyle relay	1:48.90		Alexandra Deineco; Alina Matrenitcaia; Tatiana Salcuțan; Anastasia Moscenscaia	-	2018	Moldovan Championships	Moldova	
4×100m freestyle relay	3:59.66		Maria Corlăteanu (57.69); Anastasia Basisto (1:00.40); Sophie Cernous (1:01.16); Xenia Rogovei (1:00.41)	Ss nr. 11	25 June 2026	Moldovan Championships	Chișinău, Moldova	
4×200m freestyle relay								
4×50m medley relay	2:02.31		Alexandra Degteariova; Alexandra Vinicenco; Tatiana Salcuțan; Ana Cosmina	-	2015	Moldovan Championships	Moldova	
4×100m medley relay	4:21.69		Maria Corlăteanu (1:04.11); Anastasia Basisto (1:09.57); Xenia Rogovei (1:07.41); Sophie Cernous (1:00.60)	Ss nr. 11	26 June 2026	Moldovan Championships	Chișinău, Moldova	

Legend: # – Record awaiting ratification by Moldovan Swimming Federation; WR – World record; ER – European record; e – equalled existing record;
Records not set in finals: h – heat; sf – semifinal; r – relay 1st leg; rh – relay heat 1st leg; b – B final; † – en route to final mark; so – swim-off; tt – time trial

=== Mixed relay ===
Event	Time		Name	Club	Date	Meet	Location	Ref
4×50 m freestyle relay	1:39.31	h	Constantin Malachi (22.94); Egor Covaliov (22.89); Anastasia Basisto (26.83); Alexandra Ablovatskaia (26.65)	Moldova	4 December 2025	European Championships	Lublin, Poland	
4×50 m medley relay	1:49.46	h	Tatiana Salcuțan (29.39); Tatiana Chișca (30.64); Nichita Bortnicov (25.99); Dan Siminel (23.44)	Moldova	13 December 2018	World Championships	Hangzhou, China	

Legend: # – Record awaiting ratification by Moldovan Swimming Federation; WR – World record; ER – European record; e – equalled existing record;
Records not set in finals: h – heat; so – swim-off
