= Netherlands at the 2019 World Aquatics Championships =

- Flag of the Netherlands
- World Aquatics code: NED
- National federation: Royal Dutch Swimming Federation
- Website: knzb.nl (in Dutch)

in Gwangju, South Korea
- Medals Ranked 18th: Gold 0 Silver 1 Bronze 0 Total 1

World Aquatics Championships appearances
- 1973; 1975; 1978; 1982; 1986; 1991; 1994; 1998; 2001; 2003; 2005; 2007; 2009; 2011; 2013; 2015; 2017; 2019; 2022; 2023; 2024; 2025

Netherlands competed at the 2019 World Aquatics Championships in Gwangju, South Korea from 12 to 28 July.

== Medalists ==
Medal	Name	Sport	Event	Date
Silver	Ranomi Kromowidjojo	Swimming	Women's 50 metre butterfly	27 July

== Artistic swimming ==
The Netherlands entered 2 artistic swimmers (2 female).

Athlete	Event	Preliminaries		Final	
Athlete	Event	Points	Rank	Points	Rank
Bregje de Brouwer; Noortje de Brouwer	Duet technical routine	83.8188	13	Did not advance	
Bregje de Brouwer; Noortje de Brouwer	Duet free routine	84.4000	13	Did not advance	

== Diving ==
The Netherlands entered 2 divers (2 female).

Women

Athlete	Event	Preliminaries		Semifinals		Final	
Athlete	Event	Points	Rank	Points	Rank	Points	Rank
Inge Jansen	3 m springboard	288.15	10 Q	286.80	11 Q	268.20	12
Celine van Duijn	10 m platform	301.50	13 Q	309.55	11 Q	309.40	10
Inge Jansen; Celine van Duijn	Synchronized 3 m springboard	259.50	10 Q	—N/a		277.50	7

== Open water swimming ==
The Netherlands qualified two male and two female open water swimmers.

Men

Athlete	Event	Time	Rank
Pepijn Smits	5 km	53:42.4	21
Ferry Weertman	10 km	1:48:01.9	7

Women

Athlete	Event	Time	Rank
Sharon van Rouwendaal	5 km	58:11.6	11
Sharon van Rouwendaal	10 km	1:54:51.1	10
Sharon van Rouwendaal	25 km	DNS	
Esmee Vermeulen	10 km	1:54:58.4	15

Mixed

Athlete	Event	Time	Rank
Esmee Vermeulen; Sharon van Rouwendaal; Pepijn Smits; Ferry Weertman	Team	54:37.2	7

== Swimming ==
The Netherlands entered 18 swimmers.

Men

Athlete	Event	Heat		Semifinal		Final	
Athlete	Event	Time	Rank	Time	Rank	Time	Rank
Maarten Brzoskowski	200 m freestyle	1:47.06	16 Q	1:47.13	16	Did not advance	
Ties Elzerman	50 m breaststroke	27.19	14 Q	27.61	16	Did not advance	
Mathys Goosen	50 m butterfly	23.84	24	Did not advance			
Mathys Goosen	100 m butterfly	52.87	22	Did not advance			
Arno Kamminga	100 m breaststroke	59.39	11 Q	59.49	13	Did not advance	
Arno Kamminga	200 m breaststroke	2:09.39	7 Q	2:08.48	10	Did not advance	
Arjan Knipping	200 m individual medley	2:00.12	20	Did not advance			
Arjan Knipping	400 m individual medley	4:13.46 NR	2 Q	—N/a		4:17.06	8
Jesse Puts	50 m freestyle	22.16	15 Q	21.91	12	Did not advance	
Kyle Stolk	100 m freestyle	49.20	25	Did not advance			
Jesse Puts; Nyls Korstanje; Kyle Stolk; Stan Pijnenburg	4×100 m freestyle relay	3:15.77	16	—N/a		Did not advance	
Nyls Korstanje; Arno Kamminga; Mathys Goosen; Jesse Puts	4×100 m medley relay	3:36.77	15	—N/a		Did not advance	

Women

Athlete	Event	Heat		Semifinal		Final	
Athlete	Event	Time	Rank	Time	Rank	Time	Rank
Maaike de Waard	50 m backstroke	28.19	=12 Q	28.04	12	Did not advance	
Maaike de Waard	100 m backstroke	1:01.26	25	Did not advance			
Maaike de Waard	50 m butterfly	26.40	18	Did not advance			
Femke Heemskerk	50 m freestyle	24.80	10 Q	24.77	11	Did not advance	
Femke Heemskerk	100 m freestyle	53.56	5 Q	53.16	6 Q	53.05	6
Ranomi Kromowidjojo	50 m freestyle	24.56	7 Q	24.38	7 Q	24.35	6
Ranomi Kromowidjojo	100 m freestyle	53.99	14 Q	53.43	9	Did not advance	
Ranomi Kromowidjojo	50 m butterfly	25.86	5 Q	25.54	2 Q	25.35	2nd place, silver medalist(s)
Rosey Metz	50 m breaststroke	30.99	10 Q	31.44	13	Did not advance	
Tes Schouten	50 m breaststroke	31.03	11 Q	31.31	11	Did not advance	
Tes Schouten	100 m breaststroke	1:08.01	17	Did not advance			
Kira Toussaint	50 m backstroke	27.86	3 Q	27.78	7 Q	27.85	8
Kira Toussaint	100 m backstroke	1:00.27	12 Q	1:00.13	13	Did not advance	
Kim Busch; Ranomi Kromowidjojo; Kira Toussaint; Femke Heemskerk	4×100 m freestyle relay	3:36.62	6 Q	—N/a		3:35.32	4
Kira Toussaint; Tes Schouten; Kim Busch; Femke Heemskerk	4×100 m medley relay	4:01.42	10	—N/a		Did not advance	

Mixed

Athlete	Event	Heat		Final	
Athlete	Event	Time	Rank	Time	Rank
Kyle Stolk; Jesse Puts; Femke Heemskerk; Ranomi Kromowidjojo; Kira Toussaint*; Maud van der Meer*	4×100 m freestyle relay	3:27.29	8 Q	3:23.48	6
Kira Toussaint; Arno Kamminga; Mathys Goosen; Femke Heemskerk	4×100 m medley relay	3:44.67	7 Q	DSQ	

Legend: (*) = Swimmers who participated in the heat only.

== Water polo ==
=== Women's tournament ===
Team roster

- Joanne Koenders
- Maud Megens
- Dagmar Genee (C)
- Sabrina van der Sloot
- Iris Wolves
- Nomi Stomphorst
- Bente Rogge
- Vivian Sevenich
- Maartje Keuning
- Ilse Koolhaas
- Simone van de Kraats
- Rozanne Voorvelt
- Sarah Buis
- Coach: Arno Havenga

Group A

Pos	Team	Pld	W	D	L	GF	GA	GD	Pts	Qualification
1	United States	3	3	0	0	60	13	+47	6	Quarterfinals
2	Netherlands	3	2	0	1	57	18	+39	4	Playoffs
3	New Zealand	3	1	0	2	26	41	−15	2	Playoffs
4	South Africa	3	0	0	3	5	76	−71	0	

Source: Sportresult
Rules for classification: 1) points; 2) head-to-head points; 3) head-to-head goal difference; 4) head-to-head number of goals scored; 5) Goal difference.

14 July 2019; 08:30	Report	South Africa	0–33	Netherlands	Nambu University Aquatics Center, Gwangju; Referees: Viktor Salnichenko (KAZ), Ni Shi Wei (CHN)
14 July 2019; 08:30	Report	Score by quarters: 0–7, 0–10, 0–9, 0–7			Nambu University Aquatics Center, Gwangju; Referees: Viktor Salnichenko (KAZ), Ni Shi Wei (CHN)
14 July 2019; 08:30	Report		Goals	Van de Kraats 7	Nambu University Aquatics Center, Gwangju; Referees: Viktor Salnichenko (KAZ), Ni Shi Wei (CHN)

16 July 2019; 19:10	Report	United States	12–9	Netherlands	Nambu University Aquatics Center, Gwangju; Referees: Sebastien Dervieux (FRA), Vojin Putniković (SRB)
16 July 2019; 19:10	Report	Score by quarters: 3–2, 1–2, 4–3, 4–2			Nambu University Aquatics Center, Gwangju; Referees: Sebastien Dervieux (FRA), Vojin Putniković (SRB)
16 July 2019; 19:10	Report	Gilchrist, Musselman 3	Goals	Keuning 2	Nambu University Aquatics Center, Gwangju; Referees: Sebastien Dervieux (FRA), Vojin Putniković (SRB)

18 July 2019; 17:50	Report	New Zealand	6–15	Netherlands	Nambu University Aquatics Center, Gwangju; Referees: Jaume Teixidó (ESP), Viktor Salnichenko (KAZ)
18 July 2019; 17:50	Report	Score by quarters: 0–2, 3–4, 1–4, 2–5			Nambu University Aquatics Center, Gwangju; Referees: Jaume Teixidó (ESP), Viktor Salnichenko (KAZ)
18 July 2019; 17:50	Report	McDowall 3	Goals	Megens 5	Nambu University Aquatics Center, Gwangju; Referees: Jaume Teixidó (ESP), Viktor Salnichenko (KAZ)

Playoffs

20 July 2019; 14:00	Report	Netherlands	5–4	Canada	Nambu University Aquatics Center, Gwangju; Referees: Frank Ohme (GER), Stanko Ivanovski (MNE)
20 July 2019; 14:00	Report	Score by quarters: 0–0, 4–2, 0–1, 1–1			Nambu University Aquatics Center, Gwangju; Referees: Frank Ohme (GER), Stanko Ivanovski (MNE)
20 July 2019; 14:00	Report	Megens 2	Goals	E. Wright 2	Nambu University Aquatics Center, Gwangju; Referees: Frank Ohme (GER), Stanko Ivanovski (MNE)

Quarterfinals

22 July 2019; 17:00	Report	Spain	12–8	Netherlands	Nambu University Aquatics Center, Gwangju; Referees: Marie-Claude Deslieres (CAN), Nenad Peris (CRO)
22 July 2019; 17:00	Report	Score by quarters: 6–1, 2–3, 2–1, 2–3			Nambu University Aquatics Center, Gwangju; Referees: Marie-Claude Deslieres (CAN), Nenad Peris (CRO)
22 July 2019; 17:00	Report	A. Espar, García 4	Goals	van der Sloot 3	Nambu University Aquatics Center, Gwangju; Referees: Marie-Claude Deslieres (CAN), Nenad Peris (CRO)

5th–8th place semifinals

24 July 2019; 15:30	Report	Netherlands	5–10	Italy	Nambu University Aquatics Center, Gwangju; Referees: Frank Ohme (GER), Marie-Claude Deslieres (CAN)
24 July 2019; 15:30	Report	Score by quarters: 1–3, 2–3, 1–2, 1–2			Nambu University Aquatics Center, Gwangju; Referees: Frank Ohme (GER), Marie-Claude Deslieres (CAN)
24 July 2019; 15:30	Report	Megens 3	Goals	Avegno 4	Nambu University Aquatics Center, Gwangju; Referees: Frank Ohme (GER), Marie-Claude Deslieres (CAN)

Seventh place game

26 July 2019; 14:00	Report	Greece	9–11	Netherlands	Nambu University Aquatics Center, Gwangju; Referees: Germán Moller (ARG), Alessandro Severo (ITA)
26 July 2019; 14:00	Report	Score by quarters: 2–1, 1–5, 6–4, 0–1			Nambu University Aquatics Center, Gwangju; Referees: Germán Moller (ARG), Alessandro Severo (ITA)
26 July 2019; 14:00	Report	Kotsia 3	Goals	Megens, Keuning 3	Nambu University Aquatics Center, Gwangju; Referees: Germán Moller (ARG), Alessandro Severo (ITA)
