= Moldova at the 2015 World Aquatics Championships =

- Flag of Moldova
- FINA code: MDA
- National federation: Moldovan Swimming Federation
- Website: www.swimmingmoldova.org

in Kazan, Russia
- Competitors: 5 in 1 sport
- Medals: Gold 0 Silver 0 Bronze 0 Total 0

World Aquatics Championships appearances
- 1994; 1998; 2001; 2003; 2005; 2007; 2009; 2011; 2013; 2015; 2017; 2019; 2022; 2023; 2024

Other related appearances
- Soviet Union (1973–1991)

Moldova competed at the 2015 World Aquatics Championships in Kazan, Russia from 24 July to 9 August 2015.

== Swimming ==
Moldovan swimmers have achieved qualifying standards in the following events (up to a maximum of 2 swimmers in each event at the A-standard entry time, and 1 at the B-standard):

Men

Athlete	Event	Heat		Semifinal		Final	
Athlete	Event	Time	Rank	Time	Rank	Time	Rank
Alexei Sancov	200 m freestyle	1:50.18	41	did not advance			
Alexei Sancov	400 m freestyle	3:55.83	46	—		did not advance	
Alexei Sancov	800 m freestyle	8:10.83	34	—		did not advance	
Alexei Sancov	1500 m freestyle	15:53.85	40	—		did not advance	

Women

Athlete	Event	Heat		Semifinal		Final	
Athlete	Event	Time	Rank	Time	Rank	Time	Rank
Mihaela Bat	200 m breaststroke	2:40.57	44	did not advance			
Tatiana Chişca	50 m breaststroke	32.38	42	did not advance			
Tatiana Perstniova	200 m backstroke	2:19.37	37	did not advance			
Alexandra Vinicenco	100 m breaststroke	1:13.88	50	did not advance			
Tatiana Perstniova; Tatiana Chișca; Alexandra Vinicenco; Mihaela Bat	4 × 100 m medley relay	4:26.55	25	—		did not advance	
