= Marius van Zeijts =

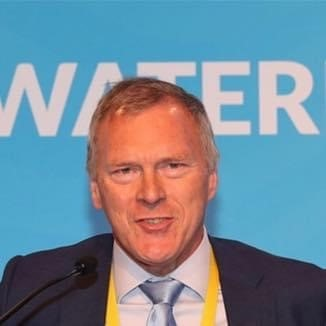
- Born: 29 May 1958 (age 68); Gorssel, Netherlands
- Education: Royal Military Academy; University of Amsterdam; Nyenrode University
- Occupations: President of the Royal Dutch Swimming Federation (2017); Bureau member Ligue Européenne de Natation (2018)

General Marius van Zeijts is an official of various swimming organizations in the Netherlands. He was born on May 29, 1958, in Gorssel, the Netherlands. In April 2017, Van Zeijts was elected Chairman of the KNZB (the Royal Dutch Swimming Federation). A year later, Van Zeijts became a member of the main board of the LEN, the Ligue Européenne de Natation - the European Swimming Federation, where he holds the position of vice-president since November 2020. As Chairman of the KNZB, he is also a member of NOC*NSF. In his military career he achieved the rank of Brigadier General and held his last position until the end of 2017 with NATO in Aix-en-Provence, France.

== Military career ==
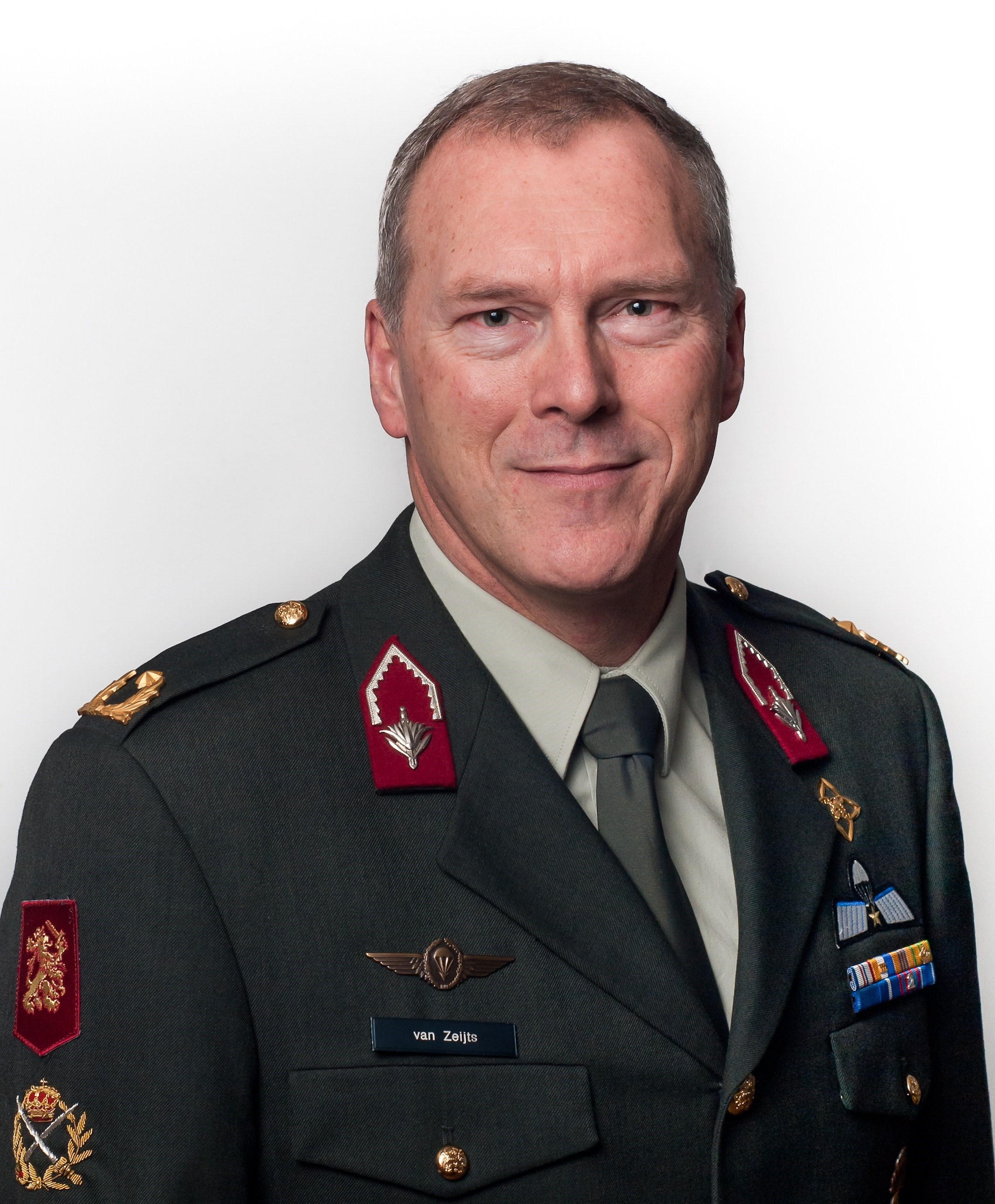

Van Zeijts joined the army in 1976 at the Royal Military Academy. After completing his education at the academy, he was commissioned in several positions. These positions included Auditing, Finance and Organization & Information. Van Zeijts obtained several academic titles, including Chartered Accountant at the University of Amsterdam and Doctoral Business Administration from Nyenrode University. In 1997 and at the age of 38, he was promoted to Colonel. A mission to SFOR's headquarters in Sarajevo followed in late 1998. In 2000, Colonel Van Zeijts was appointed Commander Higher Maintenance Agency of the Royal Netherlands Army, where he was charged with investigating possible outsourcing of maintenance work to the civil industry.

Van Zeijts has worked as a Senior Policy Advisor at the Ministry of Defence in The Hague and has held the portfolio of National Security and Personnel. In 2008 he led a short mission to Burundi which was dedicated to Strategic Sector Reform.

In 2010, Van Zeijts worked at NATO Headquarters in Brussels where he contributed to the NATO Agency Reform.

In January 2011, Van Zeijts started the position of Director of Personnel and Organization of the Royal Netherlands Army. In this period, a cutback imposed by politics had to be implemented, including a reduction in the army of 5,000 jobs. After completing the personnel reorganization, Van Zeijts was placed in the position of Division Leader Administration at NAHEMA (NATO Helicopter Design and Development, Production and Logistics Management Agency). Here, he was responsible for contracting and financing the NH90 helicopter project that was carried out on behalf of ten European countries and Australia & New Zealand.

Brigadier General Van Zeijts officially retired on November 1, 2015. However, at the request of the Ministry of Defence, he remained in his position at NAHEMA until September 2017.

== Administrative functions ==
During his military career, Van Zeijts held many additional administrative positions which were largely sports related. For example, in 1997 he joined the board of AZ&PC Amersfoort Swimming and Polo Club in Amersfoort, where he was appointed Honorary Chairman in 2004.

In 2005, Van Zeijts took the gavel from Vice Admiral Van Rijn and headed the Royal Military Fencing Association. Van Zeijts was appointed as an honorary member after his resignation in 2016.

In 2010, Van Zeijts acted as chief of mission at the Military World Fencing Championships in Caracas, Venezuela.

From 2004 to 2013, he held the position of supervisory director of the sports company SRO NV, where his main points of interest were finance and governance.

In 2003, Van Zeijts founded the Stichting Steunfonds AZ&PC. The aim of this foundation was to support the AZ&PC Association in achieving its objectives insofar as funding for them was not possible by third parties. He was chairman of this foundation from 2005 to 2019 (the year the foundation was closed).

In 2013, Van Zeijts was nominated by the Ministry of Defence as a candidate for the position of Secretary General of CISM (Conseil Internationale du Sport Militaire). CISM Europe unanimously supported this nomination. However, during the General Assembly of CISM in Jakarta, it was decided to postpone the election for a year. The following year, Van Zeijts no longer made himself available because he then lived and worked in the South of France.

In April 2017, Van Zeijts was elected Chairman of the KNZB. A year later, Van Zeijts became a member of the main board of the LEN, the Ligue Européenne de Natation - the European Swimming Federation. As Chairman of the KNZB, he is also a member of NOC*NSF.

Since 2019, Van Zeijts is the Chairman of Swim to Fight Cancer Amersfoort.

In November 2020, Van Zeijts was elected by the LEN Congress as LEN Vice -President.

== Personal life ==
Marius is married and has a daughter and son. His son has followed him in his footsteps by also participating in the Military. Throughout his career they have been residing in a villa (locally known as "the white house") near the military base in Amersfoort.
