= New Zealand at the 2019 World Aquatics Championships =

- Flag of New Zealand
- FINA code: NZL
- National federation: Swimming New Zealand
- Website: swimmingnz.org.nz

in Gwangju, South Korea
- Medals Ranked 23rd: Gold 0 Silver 0 Bronze 1 Total 1

World Aquatics Championships appearances
- 1973; 1975; 1978; 1982; 1986; 1991; 1994; 1998; 2001; 2003; 2005; 2007; 2009; 2011; 2013; 2015; 2017; 2019; 2022; 2023; 2024

New Zealand competed at the 2019 World Aquatics Championships in Gwangju, South Korea from 12 to 28 July.

== Medalists ==
Medal	Name	Sport	Event	Date
Bronze	Lewis Clareburt	Swimming	Men's 400 metre individual medley	28 July

== Artistic swimming ==
New Zealand entered 9 artistic swimmers.

Women

Athlete	Event	Preliminaries		Final	
Athlete	Event	Points	Rank	Points	Rank
Eva Morris	Solo free routine	69.5667	30	did not advance	
Eva Morris; Eden Worsley	Duet technical routine	65.8879	41	did not advance	
Eva Morris; Isobel Pettit	Duet free routine	68.8667	39	did not advance	
Nina Brown; Eva Morris; Isobel Pettit; Ali Robertson; Zyleika Smith; Karlina Steiner; Arielle Wilkes; Eden Worsley; Madeleine Pastor-Pasi (R)	Team technical routine	66.4279	22	did not advance	
Nina Brown; Eva Morris; Isobel Pettit; Ali Robertson; Zyleika Smith; Karlina Steiner; Arielle Wilkes; Eden Worsley; Madeleine Pastor-Pasi (R)	Team free routine	70.1667	24	did not advance	

Legend: (R) = Reserve Athlete

== Diving ==
New Zealand entered six divers.

Men

Athlete	Event	Preliminaries		Semifinals		Final	
Athlete	Event	Points	Rank	Points	Rank	Points	Rank
Anton Down-Jenkins	3 m springboard	307.30	48	did not advance			
Liam Stone	3 m springboard	332.15	42	did not advance			
Nathan Brown	10 m platform	293.80	40	did not advance			
Anton Down-Jenkins; Liam Stone	3 m synchronized springboard	319.29	18	—		did not advance	

Women

Athlete	Event	Preliminaries		Semifinals		Final	
Athlete	Event	Points	Rank	Points	Rank	Points	Rank
Shaye Boddington	1 m springboard	208.40	26	—		did not advance	
Shaye Boddington	3 m springboard	176.85	46	did not advance			
Elizabeth Cui	1 m springboard	235.90	11 Q	—		245.60	7
Elizabeth Cui	3 m springboard	273.90	14 Q	284.10	13	did not advance	
Elizabeth Cui; Goh Yu Qian	3 m synchronized springboard	236.40	17	—		did not advance	

Mixed

Athlete	Event	Final	
Athlete	Event	Points	Rank
Anton Down-Jenkins; Elizabeth Cui	3 m synchronized springboard	274.80	9

== Swimming ==
New Zealand entered 11 swimmers.

Men

Athlete	Event	Heat		Semifinal		Final	
Athlete	Event	Time	Rank	Time	Rank	Time	Rank
Bradlee Ashby	100 m backstroke	55.02	30	did not advance			
Bradlee Ashby	100 m butterfly	53.73	36	did not advance			
Bradlee Ashby	200 m individual medley	1:59.96	18	did not advance			
Lewis Clareburt	400 m individual medley	4:14.56	5 Q	—		4:12.07	3rd place, bronze medalist(s)
Daniel Hunter	100 m freestyle	24.21	38	did not advance			
Daniel Hunter	50 m butterfly	24.21	38	did not advance			
Michael Pickett	50 m freestyle	22.59	=38	did not advance			
Zac Reid	400 m freestyle	3:51.25	18	—		did not advance	
Zac Reid	800 m freestyle	7:57.46	20	—		did not advance	
Matthew Stanley	200 m freestyle	1:49.36	34	did not advance			
Lewis Clareburt; Matthew Stanley; Daniel Hunter; Zac Reid	4×200 m freestyle relay	7:13.06 NR	14	—		did not advance	

Women

Athlete	Event	Heat		Semifinal		Final	
Athlete	Event	Time	Rank	Time	Rank	Time	Rank
Chelsey Edwards	50 m freestyle	26.05	37	did not advance			
Erika Fairweather	200 m freestyle	1:59.68	19	did not advance			
Erika Fairweather	400 m freestyle	4:12.30	17	—		did not advance	
Ali Galyer	100 m backstroke	1:01.53	30	did not advance			
Ali Galyer	200 m backstroke	2:09.98	8 Q	2:10.19	12	did not advance	
Eve Thomas	800 m freestyle	8:44.65	21	—		did not advance	
Erika Fairweather; Carina Doyle; Chelsey Edwards; Eve Thomas	4×200 m freestyle relay	8:03.28	10	—		did not advance	

== Water polo ==
=== Men's tournament ===
Team roster

- Sid Dymond
- Matthew Lewis
- Rowan Brown
- Ryan Pike
- Nicholas Stankovich
- Matthew Small (C)
- Anton Sunde
- Joshua Potaka
- Sean Bryant
- Matthew Bryant
- Louis Clark
- Sean Newcombe
- Bae Fountain
- Coach: Davor Carevic

Group C

Pos	Team	Pld	W	D	L	GF	GA	GD	Pts	Qualification
1	Hungary	3	3	0	0	60	20	+40	6	Quarterfinals
2	Spain	3	2	0	1	57	19	+38	4	Playoffs
3	South Africa	3	0	1	2	16	54	−38	1	Playoffs
4	New Zealand	3	0	1	2	15	55	−40	1	

Source: Sportresult
Rules for classification: 1) points; 2) head-to-head points; 3) head-to-head goal difference; 4) head-to-head number of goals scored; 5) Goal difference.

15 July 2019; 17:50	Report	New Zealand	4–24	Hungary	Nambu University Aquatics Center, Gwangju; Referees: An Jin-yong (KOR), Dion Willis (RSA)
15 July 2019; 17:50	Report	Score by quarters: 0–4, 1–7, 2–6, 1–7			Nambu University Aquatics Center, Gwangju; Referees: An Jin-yong (KOR), Dion Willis (RSA)
15 July 2019; 17:50	Report	four players	Goals	Zalánki 4	Nambu University Aquatics Center, Gwangju; Referees: An Jin-yong (KOR), Dion Willis (RSA)

17 July 2019; 12:30	Report	South Africa	8–8	New Zealand	Nambu University Aquatics Center, Gwangju; Referees: Georgios Stavridis (GRE), Stanko Ivanovski (MNE)
17 July 2019; 12:30	Report	Score by quarters: 2–0, 2–2, 2–4, 2–2			Nambu University Aquatics Center, Gwangju; Referees: Georgios Stavridis (GRE), Stanko Ivanovski (MNE)
17 July 2019; 12:30	Report	three players 2	Goals	Small 2	Nambu University Aquatics Center, Gwangju; Referees: Georgios Stavridis (GRE), Stanko Ivanovski (MNE)

19 July 2019; 09:50	Report	New Zealand	3–23	Spain	Nambu University Aquatics Center, Gwangju; Referees: Jeremy Cheng (SGP), Vojin Putniković (SRB)
19 July 2019; 09:50	Report	Score by quarters: 0–8, 1–5, 1–7, 1–3			Nambu University Aquatics Center, Gwangju; Referees: Jeremy Cheng (SGP), Vojin Putniković (SRB)
19 July 2019; 09:50	Report	three players 1	Goals	Barosso 6	Nambu University Aquatics Center, Gwangju; Referees: Jeremy Cheng (SGP), Vojin Putniković (SRB)

13th–16th place semifinals

21 July 2019; 12:00	Report	New Zealand	8–12	Brazil	Nambu University Aquatics Center, Gwangju; Referees: Frank Ohme (GER), Kunihiro Sato (JPN)
21 July 2019; 12:00	Report	Score by quarters: 1–2, 4–6, 2–2, 1–2			Nambu University Aquatics Center, Gwangju; Referees: Frank Ohme (GER), Kunihiro Sato (JPN)
21 July 2019; 12:00	Report	Small 3	Goals	P. Real, Guimarães 3	Nambu University Aquatics Center, Gwangju; Referees: Frank Ohme (GER), Kunihiro Sato (JPN)

15th place game

23 July 2019; 08:00	Report	South Korea	17–16	New Zealand	Nambu University Aquatics Center, Gwangju; Referees: Jaume Teixidó (ESP), Sebastien Dervieux (FRA)
23 July 2019; 08:00	Report	Score by quarters: 3–3, 2–2, 4–5, 3–2 PSO: 5–4			Nambu University Aquatics Center, Gwangju; Referees: Jaume Teixidó (ESP), Sebastien Dervieux (FRA)
23 July 2019; 08:00	Report	Gwon Y-g 3	Goals	Lewis 4	Nambu University Aquatics Center, Gwangju; Referees: Jaume Teixidó (ESP), Sebastien Dervieux (FRA)

=== Women's tournament ===
Team roster

- Jessica Milicich (C)
- Emily Nicholson
- Bernadette Doyle
- Shinae Carrington
- Elizabeth Alsemgeest
- Morgan Mcdowall
- Emmerson Houghton
- Katie McKenty
- Grace Tobin
- Kaitlyn Howarth
- Amanda Lemon
- Kate Enoka
- Bridget Layburn
- Coach: Angela Winstanley-Smith

Group A

Pos	Team	Pld	W	D	L	GF	GA	GD	Pts	Qualification
1	United States	3	3	0	0	60	13	+47	6	Quarterfinals
2	Netherlands	3	2	0	1	57	18	+39	4	Playoffs
3	New Zealand	3	1	0	2	26	41	−15	2	Playoffs
4	South Africa	3	0	0	3	5	76	−71	0	

Source: Sportresult
Rules for classification: 1) points; 2) head-to-head points; 3) head-to-head goal difference; 4) head-to-head number of goals scored; 5) Goal difference.

14 July 2019; 09:50	Report	New Zealand	3–22	United States	Nambu University Aquatics Center, Gwangju; Referees: Jaume Teixidó (ESP), Stanko Ivanovski (MNE)
14 July 2019; 09:50	Report	Score by quarters: 0–8, 1–4, 0–6, 2–4			Nambu University Aquatics Center, Gwangju; Referees: Jaume Teixidó (ESP), Stanko Ivanovski (MNE)
14 July 2019; 09:50	Report	Doyle 2	Goals	Haralabidis 5	Nambu University Aquatics Center, Gwangju; Referees: Jaume Teixidó (ESP), Stanko Ivanovski (MNE)

16 July 2019; 20:30	Report	South Africa	4–17	New Zealand	Nambu University Aquatics Center, Gwangju; Referees: Alessandro Severo (ITA), Daniel Flahive (AUS)
16 July 2019; 20:30	Report	Score by quarters: 0–6, 0–2, 2–6, 2–3			Nambu University Aquatics Center, Gwangju; Referees: Alessandro Severo (ITA), Daniel Flahive (AUS)
16 July 2019; 20:30	Report	Hallendorff 2	Goals	Doyle, McDowall 4	Nambu University Aquatics Center, Gwangju; Referees: Alessandro Severo (ITA), Daniel Flahive (AUS)

18 July 2019; 17:50	Report	New Zealand	6–15	Netherlands	Nambu University Aquatics Center, Gwangju; Referees: Jaume Teixidó (ESP), Viktor Salnichenko (KAZ)
18 July 2019; 17:50	Report	Score by quarters: 0–2, 3–4, 1–4, 2–5			Nambu University Aquatics Center, Gwangju; Referees: Jaume Teixidó (ESP), Viktor Salnichenko (KAZ)
18 July 2019; 17:50	Report	McDowall 3	Goals	Megens 5	Nambu University Aquatics Center, Gwangju; Referees: Jaume Teixidó (ESP), Viktor Salnichenko (KAZ)

Playoffs

20 July 2019; 15:30	Report	New Zealand	6–17	Hungary	Nambu University Aquatics Center, Gwangju; Referees: Natacha Florestano (BRA), Juan Menéndez (CUB)
20 July 2019; 15:30	Report	Score by quarters: 2–4, 1–4, 1–4, 2–5			Nambu University Aquatics Center, Gwangju; Referees: Natacha Florestano (BRA), Juan Menéndez (CUB)
20 July 2019; 15:30	Report	Houghton, McDowall 2	Goals	Keszthelyi 4	Nambu University Aquatics Center, Gwangju; Referees: Natacha Florestano (BRA), Juan Menéndez (CUB)

9th–12th place semifinals

22 July 2019; 12:30	Report	New Zealand	12–14	Kazakhstan	Nambu University Aquatics Center, Gwangju; Referees: Dion Willis (RSA), Georgios Stavridis (GRE)
22 July 2019; 12:30	Report	Score by quarters: 3–6, 3–2, 2–0, 2–2 PSO: 2–4			Nambu University Aquatics Center, Gwangju; Referees: Dion Willis (RSA), Georgios Stavridis (GRE)
22 July 2019; 12:30	Report	Doyle 4	Goals	Mirshina 4	Nambu University Aquatics Center, Gwangju; Referees: Dion Willis (RSA), Georgios Stavridis (GRE)

Eleventh place game

24 July 2019; 09:30	Report	China	14–12	New Zealand	Nambu University Aquatics Center, Gwangju; Referees: Natacha Florestano (BRA), Jeremy Cheng (SGP)
24 July 2019; 09:30	Report	Score by quarters: 4–2, 3–2, 4–2, 3–6			Nambu University Aquatics Center, Gwangju; Referees: Natacha Florestano (BRA), Jeremy Cheng (SGP)
24 July 2019; 09:30	Report	Zhang J 3	Goals	McDowall, Houghton 4	Nambu University Aquatics Center, Gwangju; Referees: Natacha Florestano (BRA), Jeremy Cheng (SGP)
