= Swimming at the 2019 World Aquatics Championships – Men's 200 metre individual medley =

Men's 200 metre individual medley at the 2019 World Aquatics Championships
- Venue: Nambu University Municipal Aquatics Center
- Location: Gwangju, South Korea
- Dates: 24 July (heats and semifinals); 25 July (final)
- Competitors: 51 from 45 nations
- Winning time: 1:56.14

Medalists
gold medal	Daiya Seto	Japan
silver medal	Jérémy Desplanches	Switzerland
bronze medal	Chase Kalisz	United States

The Men's 200 metre individual medley competition at the 2019 World Championships was held on 24 and 25 July 2019.

== Records ==
Prior to the competition, the existing world and championship records were as follows.

World record	Ryan Lochte (USA)	1:54.00	Shanghai, China	28 July 2011
Competition record	Ryan Lochte (USA)	1:54.00	Shanghai, China	28 July 2011

== Results ==
=== Heats ===
The heats were held on 24 July at 10:50.

Rank	Heat	Lane	Name	Nationality	Time	Notes
1	4	7	László Cseh	Hungary	1:57.79	Q
2	4	5	Daiya Seto	Japan	1:57.90	Q
3	6	4	Chase Kalisz	United States	1:58.20	Q
4	6	3	Jérémy Desplanches	Switzerland	1:58.43	Q
5	6	5	Duncan Scott	Great Britain	1:58.57	Q
6	5	5	Philip Heintz	Germany	1:58.71	Q
7	5	6	Andrey Zhilkin	Russia	1:58.73	Q
8	5	4	Mitch Larkin	Australia	1:58.75	Q
9	4	2	Thomas Fraser-Holmes	Australia	1:58.86	Q
10	4	6	Alexis Santos	Portugal	1:59.01	Q
11	4	4	Wang Shun	China	1:59.18	Q
12	5	3	Abrahm DeVine	United States	1:59.26	Q
13	6	7	Leonardo Coelho Santos	Brazil	1:59.37	Q
14	6	9	Raphaël Stacchiotti	Luxembourg	1:59.62	Q, NR
15	5	7	Thomas Dean	Great Britain	1:59.64	Q
16	5	2	Gabriel Lópes	Portugal	1:59.76	Q
17	6	2	Andreas Vazaios	Greece	1:59.80	
18	4	1	Bradlee Ashby	New Zealand	1:59.96	
19	5	0	Tomas Peribonio	Ecuador	2:00.07	NR
20	4	0	Arjan Knipping	Netherlands	2:00.12	NR
21	5	8	Simon Sjödin	Sweden	2:00.67	
22	6	8	Yakov Toumarkin	Israel	2:00.97	
23	4	3	Caio Pumputis	Brazil	2:01.06	
24	3	1	Wang Hsing-hao	Chinese Taipei	2:01.54	
24	3	8	Jarod Arroyo	Puerto Rico	2:01.54	NR
26	5	9	Metin Aydın	Turkey	2:01.72	
27	2	5	Jaouad Syoud	Algeria	2:01.76	NR
28	3	6	Dawid Szwedzki	Poland	2:02.14	
29	4	9	Kim Min-suk	South Korea	2:02.36	
30	3	9	Andrius Šidlauskas	Lithuania	2:02.50	
31	6	1	Péter Bernek	Hungary	2:02.56	
32	3	4	Mohamed Samy	Egypt	2:02.57	
33	2	3	Christoph Meier	Liechtenstein	2:02.68	NR
34	6	6	Hugo González	Spain	2:03.09	
35	3	7	Pang Sheng Jun	Singapore	2:03.96	
36	3	5	Cole Pratt	Canada	2:04.26	
37	2	7	Svetlozar Nikolov	Bulgaria	2:04.99	
38	2	4	Keanan Dols	Jamaica	2:05.18	
39	3	0	Eben Vorster	South Africa	2:05.69	
40	2	1	Brandon Schuster	Samoa	2:06.93	
41	1	4	Munzer Kabbara	Lebanon	2:07.27	
42	2	8	Alvi Hjelm	Faroe Islands	2:07.91	
43	2	0	Ronan Wantenaar	Namibia	2:09.02	
44	2	9	Christian Mayer	Peru	2:09.69	
45	1	3	Davor Petrovski	North Macedonia	2:10.74	
46	1	2	Lin Sizhuang	Macau	2:10.87	
47	2	2	Julio Horrego	Honduras	2:11.10	
48	2	6	Patrick Groters	Aruba	2:11.38	
49	3	2	Triady Fauzi Sidiq	Indonesia	2:12.09	
50	1	5	Fausto Huerta	Dominican Republic	2:13.64	
51	1	6	Kinley Lhendup	Bhutan	3:00.53	
	3	3	Brendan Hyland	Ireland	DNS	
	4	8	Thomas Ceccon	Italy	DNS	
	5	1	Tomoe Zenimoto Hvas	Norway	DNS	
	6	0	Bernhard Reitshammer	Austria	DNS	

=== Semifinals ===
The semifinals were held on 24 July at 21:31.

==== Semifinal 1 ====
Rank	Lane	Name	Nationality	Time	Notes
1	5	Jérémy Desplanches	Switzerland	1:56.73	Q, NR
2	3	Philip Heintz	Germany	1:56.95	Q
3	4	Daiya Seto	Japan	1:57.10	Q
4	6	Mitch Larkin	Australia	1:57.45	Q
5	7	Abrahm DeVine	United States	1:57.91	Q
6	2	Alexis Santos	Portugal	1:58.62	
7	8	Gabriel Lópes	Portugal	1:59.56	
8	1	Raphaël Stacchiotti	Luxembourg	2:00.26	

==== Semifinal 2 ====
Rank	Lane	Name	Nationality	Time	Notes
1	5	Chase Kalisz	United States	1:57.34	Q
2	3	Duncan Scott	Great Britain	1:57.83	Q
3	7	Wang Shun	China	1:57.98	Q
4	6	Andrey Zhilkin	Russia	1:58.16	NR
5	4	László Cseh	Hungary	1:58.17	
6	8	Thomas Dean	Great Britain	1:58.34	
7	2	Thomas Fraser-Holmes	Australia	1:58.86	
8	1	Leonardo Coelho Santos	Brazil	1:58.99	

=== Final ===
The final was held on 25 July at 21:05.

Rank	Lane	Name	Nationality	Time	Notes
1st place, gold medalist(s)	3	Daiya Seto	Japan	1:56.14	
2nd place, silver medalist(s)	4	Jérémy Desplanches	Switzerland	1:56.56	NR
3rd place, bronze medalist(s)	6	Chase Kalisz	United States	1:56.78	
4	5	Philip Heintz	Germany	1:56.86	
5	7	Duncan Scott	Great Britain	1:56.91	
6	8	Wang Shun	China	1:56.97	
7	2	Mitch Larkin	Australia	1:57.32	
8	1	Abrahm DeVine	United States	1:57.66	
