= Swimming at the 2024 Summer Olympics – Men's 100-metre butterfly =

Men's 100 metre butterfly at the Games of the XXXIII Olympiad
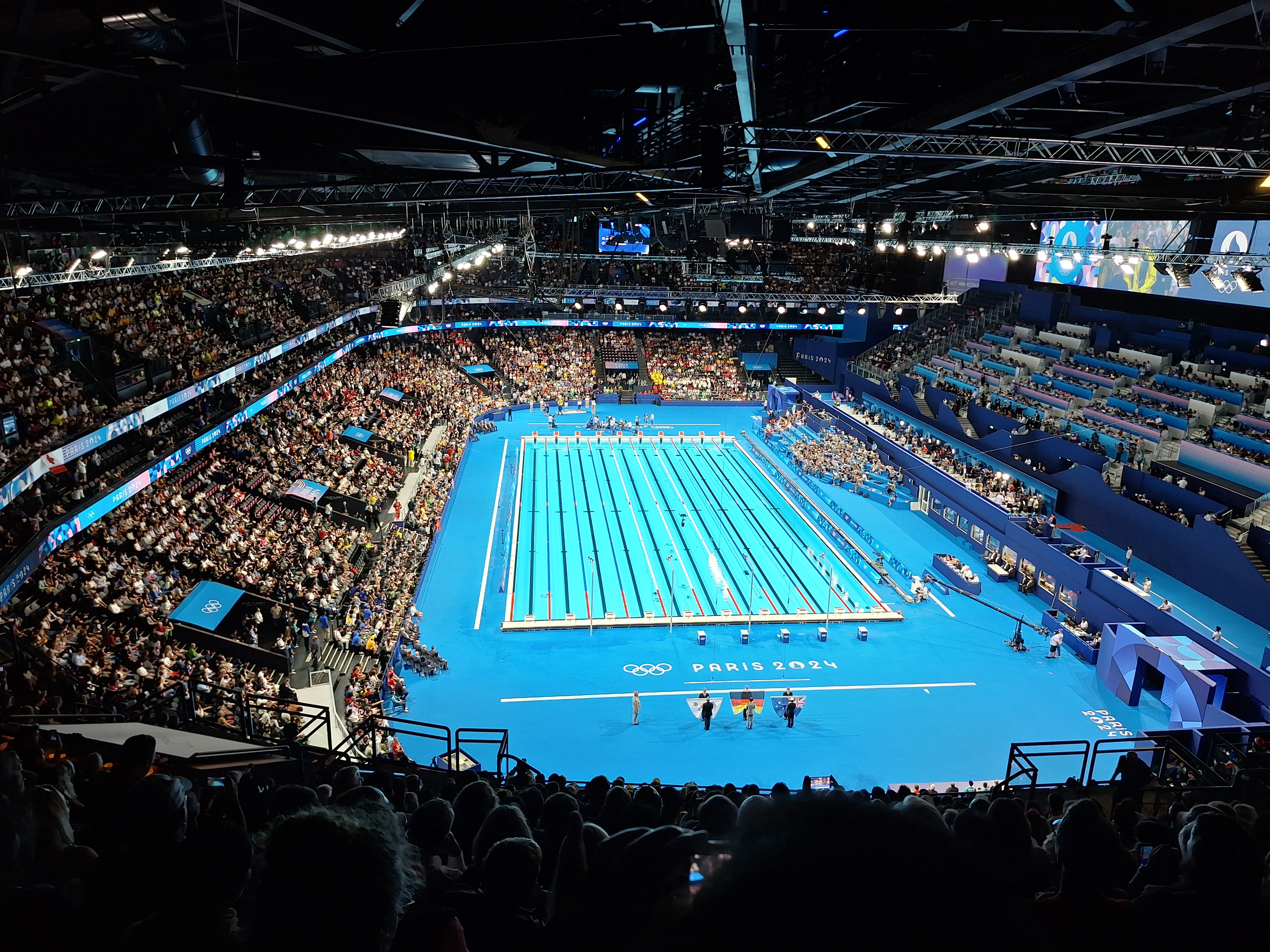
- Paris La Défense Arena after it was converted to a swimming pool for the swimming events
- Venue: Paris La Défense Arena
- Dates: 2 August 2024 (Heats and Semis); 3 August 2024 (Final)
- Competitors: 40 from 31 nations
- Winning time: 49.90

Medalists
1st place, gold medalist(s)		Kristóf Milák	Hungary
2nd place, silver medalist(s)		Joshua Liendo	Canada
3rd place, bronze medalist(s)		Ilya Kharun	Canada

The men's 100 metre butterfly event at the 2024 Summer Olympics was held from 2 to 3 August 2024 at Paris La Défense Arena, which was converted to a swimming pool for the swimming events.

Caeleb Dressel of the US was the favourite going into the event, while defending Olympic silver medallist Kristóf Milák of Hungary, Canada's Josh Liendo and France's Maxime Grousset were also favourites based on recent results. In the semifinals, Dressel did not qualify for the final, while Nyls Korstanje set a new Dutch record to qualify fourth. Milák won the final with a time of 49.90, 0.09 seconds ahead of Liendo who won silver with a new Canadian national record of 49.99. Canada's Ilya Kharun finished third with 50.45.

== Background ==
The defending Olympic champion, Caeleb Dressel of the US; the defending Olympic silver medallist, Kristóf Milák of Hungary; and the defending Olympic bronze medallist, Noè Ponti of Switzerland, were returning. Dressel had missed a period of competition from 2022 to 2023, during which Milák won the event at the 2022 World Championships. However, he also took a break from swimming in 2023. Milák returned to training in 2024, but the Hungarian national head coach Csaba Sós reported that Milák had been training inconsistently in the lead up to the Olympics. In Dressel and Milák's absence, France's Maxime Grousset won the event at the 2023 World Championships.

Going into the event, Canada's Josh Liendo was ranked number one in the world, having swum a 50.06 at the Canadian Olympic Trials. Other contenders who had swum under 51 seconds in 2024 were: Hungarian Hubert Kós, Dutchman Nyls Korstanje, Katsuhiro Matsumoto of Japan, Jakub Majerski of Poland, Gal Cohen Groumi of Israel and Thomas Heilman of the US. Both SwimSwam and Swimming World projected that Dressel would win gold and Liendo would take silver. Swimming World also said it was "one of the most anticipated races of the Paris Games" due to several competitors having qualifying times in the low-to-mid 50 seconds.

Prior to the event, the world and Olympic records were 49.45, set by Dressel at the 2020 games.

The event was held at Paris La Défense Arena, which was converted to a swimming pool for the swimming events.

== Qualification ==
Each National Olympic Committee (NOC) was permitted to enter a maximum of two qualified athletes in each individual event, but only if both of them had attained the Olympic Qualifying Time (OQT). For this event, the OQT was 51.67 seconds. World Aquatics then considered athletes qualifying through universality; NOCs were given one event entry for each gender, which could be used by any athlete regardless of qualification time, providing the spaces had not already been taken by athletes from that nation who had achieved the OQT. Finally, the rest of the spaces were filled by athletes who had met the Olympic Consideration Time (OCT), which was 51.93 for this event. In total, 29 athletes qualified through achieving the OQT, 10 athletes qualified through universality places and one athlete qualified through achieving the OCT.

Top 10 fastest qualification times
Swimmer	Country	Time	Competition
Josh Liendo	Canada	50.06	2024 Canadian Olympic Trials
Maxime Grousset	France	50.14	2023 World Aquatics Championships
Noè Ponti	Switzerland	50.16	2024 Swiss Championships
Caeleb Dressel	United States	50.19	2024 United States Olympic Trials
Matthew Temple	Australia	50.25	2023 Japan Open
Kristóf Milák	Hungary	50.75	2024 Mare Nostrum Monte Carlo
Nyls Korstanje	Netherlands	50.78	2023 World Aquatics Championships
Thomas Heilman	United States	50.80	2024 United States Olympic Trials
Hubert Kós	Hungary	50.84	2024 Pro Swim Series San Antonio
Katsuhiro Matsumoto	Japan	50.96	2023 Japanese Championships

== Heats ==
Five heats (preliminary rounds) took place on 2 August 2024, starting at 11:00. (Note: All times are Central European Summer Time (UTC+2)) The swimmers with the best 16 times in the heats advanced to the semifinals. Milák swam the fastest, with a time of 50.19. Heilman did not qualify. Jesse Ssuubi Ssengonzi lowered his Ugandan record with a time of 53.76.

Results
Rank	Heat	Lane	Swimmer	Nation	Time	Notes
1	3	5	Kristóf Milák	Hungary	50.19	Q
2	5	4	Josh Liendo	Canada	50.55	Q
3	3	4	Noè Ponti	Switzerland	50.65	Q
3	4	4	Maxime Grousset	France	50.65	Q
5	5	2	Ilya Kharun	Canada	50.71	Q
6	5	5	Caeleb Dressel	United States	50.83	Q
7	4	5	Matthew Temple	Australia	50.89	Q
8	5	3	Nyls Korstanje	Netherlands	51.17	Q
9	4	6	Jakub Majerski	Poland	51.18	Q
10	3	6	Gal Cohen Groumi	Israel	51.30	Q
11	5	1	Ben Armbruster	Australia	51.33	Q
12	5	6	Katsuhiro Matsumoto	Japan	51.43	Q
13	4	7	Simon Bucher	Austria	51.55	Q
14	3	3	Hubert Kós	Hungary	51.58	Q
15	4	1	Naoki Mizunuma	Japan	51.62	Q
15	5	7	Clément Secchi	France	51.62	Q
17	3	8	Josif Miladinov	Bulgaria	51.77	
18	4	3	Thomas Heilman	United States	51.82	
19	2	6	Sun Jiajun	China	51.85	
20	3	2	Diogo Ribeiro	Portugal	51.90	
21	4	2	Tomer Frankel	Israel	51.94	
22	4	8	Kayky Mota	Brazil	52.11	
23	5	8	James Guy	Great Britain	52.23	
24	2	5	Chad le Clos	South Africa	52.24	
25	2	4	Mario Mollà	Spain	52.27	
26	3	7	Wang Changhao	China	52.37	
27	3	1	Daniel Gracík	Czech Republic	52.61	
28	2	3	Kaii Winkler	Germany	52.64	
29	2	7	Adilbek Mussin	Kazakhstan	52.74	
30	1	2	Nikola Miljenić	Croatia	53.32	
31	1	3	Jesse Ssuubi Ssengonzi	Uganda	53.76	NR
32	2	1	Cameron Gray	New Zealand	53.83	
33	1	5	Joe Kurniawan	Indonesia	53.95	
34	1	4	Miloš Milenković	Montenegro	54.26	
35	2	2	Matthew Sates	South Africa	54.53	
36	1	6	Josh Kirlew	Jamaica	54.66	
36	2	8	Jarod Hatch	Philippines	54.66	
38	1	7	Oscar Mitilla	Rwanda	58.77	
39	1	1	Hasan Al-Zinkee	Iraq	1:00.23	
40	1	8	Yusuf Nasser	Yemen	1:08.72	

== Semifinals ==
Two semifinals took place on 2 August, starting at 21:05. The swimmers with the best eight times in the semifinals advanced to the final. Milák claimed the fastest seed with at time of 50.38, and Grousset finished with 50.41 to take the second seed. Dressel did not make it through to the final with a time of 51.57, and was filmed crying after the race. SwimSwam speculated that is poor performance could have been due to having already swum three races that day, including the final of the 50 metre freestyle 30 minutes earlier. Nyls Korstanje set a new Dutch record of 50.59 to qualify fourth, which beat his previous national record of 50.78. None of the countries that qualified had previously won a gold medal in the event.

Results
Rank	Heat	Lane	Swimmer	Nation	Time	Notes
1	2	4	Kristóf Milák	Hungary	50.38	Q
2	1	5	Maxime Grousset	France	50.41	Q
3	1	4	Josh Liendo	Canada	50.42	Q
4	1	6	Nyls Korstanje	Netherlands	50.59	Q, NR
5	2	5	Noè Ponti	Switzerland	50.60	Q
6	2	3	Ilya Kharun	Canada	50.68	Q
7	2	6	Matthew Temple	Australia	50.95	Q
8	2	8	Naoki Mizunuma	Japan	51.08	Q
9	2	7	Ben Armbruster	Australia	51.17	
10	2	1	Simon Bucher	Austria	51.35	
11	2	2	Jakub Majerski	Poland	51.37	
12	1	2	Gal Cohen Groumi	Israel	51.48	
13	1	3	Caeleb Dressel	United States	51.57	
14	1	8	Clément Secchi	France	51.58	
15	1	7	Katsuhiro Matsumoto	Japan	51.69	
16	1	1	Hubert Kós	Hungary	52.22	

== Final ==
The final took place at 20:30 on 3 August. Milák won with a time of 49.90; he was fifth at the halfway turn but finished with the fastest closing 50 metres split to win gold. Canada's Ilya Kharun had the second fastest closing 50 metres split, which elevated him from seventh at halfway to third at the finish, winning him the bronze. Grousset was third at the 50 metre mark, but performed a slow turn compared to the rest of the field which SwimSwam later opined may have cost him third place. Liendo was second at the 50 metre mark, but he performed a fast open turn and underwater to emerge in the lead. He didn't finish as close to the optimum period in the butterfly stroke as Milák did, which SwimSwam said might have cost him the gold medal. He won silver with a new Canadian national record of 49.99. Kharun was the only swimmer to increase his distance per stroke (DPS) throughout the race, while Milák had the highest average DPS.

Liendo's silver made him the fifth fastest performer of all time in the event and won him his first Olympic medal. Liendo and Kharun gave Canada its first double podium of the games since the 1976 Summer Olympics.

Results
Rank	Lane	Swimmer	Nation	Time	Notes
1st place, gold medalist(s)	4	Kristóf Milák	Hungary	49.90	
2nd place, silver medalist(s)	3	Josh Liendo	Canada	49.99	NR
3rd place, bronze medalist(s)	7	Ilya Kharun	Canada	50.45	
4	2	Noè Ponti	Switzerland	50.55	
5	5	Maxime Grousset	France	50.75	
6	6	Nyls Korstanje	Netherlands	50.83	
7	1	Matthew Temple	Australia	51.10	
8	8	Naoki Mizunuma	Japan	51.11	

Statistics
Name	15 metre split (s)	50 metre split (s)	50–65 metre split (s)	Time (s)	Stroke rate (strokes/min)
Kristof Milak	5.25	23.40	7.42	49.90	52.7
Josh Liendo	5.22	23.24	7.41	49.99	56.8
Ilya Kharun	5.48	23.73	7.40	50.45	58.7
Noe Ponti	5.36	23.70	7.21	50.55	56.7
Maxime Grousset	5.42	23.26	7.86	50.75	54.9
Nyls Korstanje	5.36	23.23	7.58	50.83	58.6
Matthew Temple	5.25	23.59	7.38	51.10	53.8
Naoki Mizunuma	5.70	24.03	7.62	51.11	58.0
