= Moldova at the 2019 World Aquatics Championships =

- Flag of Moldova
- FINA code: MDA
- National federation: Moldovan Swimming Federation
- Website: www.swimmingmoldova.org

in Gwangju, South Korea
- Medals: Gold 0 Silver 0 Bronze 0 Total 0

World Aquatics Championships appearances
- 1994; 1998; 2001; 2003; 2005; 2007; 2009; 2011; 2013; 2015; 2017; 2019; 2022; 2023; 2024

Other related appearances
- Soviet Union (1973–1991)

Moldova competed at the 2019 World Aquatics Championships in Gwangju, South Korea from 12 to 28 July.

== Swimming ==
Moldova entered four swimmers.

Men

Athlete	Event	Heat		Semifinal		Final	
Athlete	Event	Time	Rank	Time	Rank	Time	Rank
Constantin Malachi	50 m freestyle	23.11	54	did not advance			
Constantin Malachi	50 m breaststroke	29.76	57	did not advance			
Alexei Sancov	100 m freestyle	50.05	46	did not advance			
Alexei Sancov	200 m freestyle	1:48.60	=27	did not advance			

Women

Athlete	Event	Heat		Semifinal		Final	
Athlete	Event	Time	Rank	Time	Rank	Time	Rank
Tatiana Chișca	50 m breaststroke	31.68	24	did not advance			
Tatiana Chișca	100 m breaststroke	1:10.16	=33	did not advance			
Tatiana Salcuțan	100 m backstroke	1:03.08	40	did not advance			
Tatiana Salcuțan	200 m backstroke	2:10.29	10 Q	2:10.82	14	did not advance	

Mixed

Athlete	Event	Heat		Final	
Athlete	Event	Time	Rank	Time	Rank
Tatiana Salcuțan; Tatiana Chișca; Alexei Sancov; Constantin Malachi	4×100 m medley relay	3:55.15	22	did not advance	
