= Swimming at the 2015 European Youth Summer Olympic Festival =

Swimming at the 2015 European Youth Summer Olympic Festival was held in July 2015 in Tbilisi, Georgia.

== Medal events ==
=== Boys' events ===
Games	Gold		Silver		Bronze	
50m Freestyle	Nyls Korstanje; Netherlands	23.26	Oleksandr Moroz; Ukraine	23.65	István Végh; Hungary	23.68
100m Freestyle	Alexei Sancov; Moldova	50.90	Nyls Korstanje; Netherlands	50.97	Aleksa Bobar; Serbia	51.60
200m Freestyle	Alexei Sancov; Moldova	1:49.20	Johannes Hintze; Germany	1:50.18	Richárd Márton; Hungary	1:50.42
400m Freestyle	Alexei Sancov; Moldova	3:53.42	César Castro Valle; Spain	3:54.17	Richárd Márton; Hungary	3:54.36
1500m Freestyle	César Castro Valle; Spain	15:24.02 MR	Alexei Sancov; Moldova	15:29.73	Dávid Huszti; Hungary	15:32.00
100m Backstroke	Hugo González; Spain	55.87	Conor Ferguson; Ireland	56.44	Kacper Stokowski; Poland	56.97
200m Backstroke	Pavel Tatarenko; Russia	2:03.21	Conor Ferguson; Ireland	2:03.46	Daniel Cristian Martin; Romania	2:04.92
100m Breaststroke	Nicolò Martinenghi; Italy	1:01.75	Daniil Kitov; Russia	1:02.45	Tanguy Lesparre; France	1:03.25
200m Breaststroke	Nicolò Martinenghi; Italy	2:15.14	Rafał Kusto; Poland	2:17.45	Tanguy Lesparre; France	2:17.61
100m Butterfly	Kregor Zirk; Estonia	54.07	Tomer Frankel; Israel; Egor Kuimov; Russia	54.57	not awarded	
200m Butterfly	Dmitry Popov; Russia	2:00.86	Richard Marton; Hungary	2:01.39	Arnau Honrubia Cerdá; Spain	2:04.00
200m Medley	Johannes Hintze; Germany	2:02.52	Hugo González; Spain	2:02.85	Evgenii Somov; Russia	2:03.91
400m Medley	Barta Márton; Hungary	4:24.73	Hugo González; Spain	4:28.68	Tanguy Lesparre; France	4:29.15
4×100m Freestyle Relay	Russia; Evgenii Somov (52.11); Kliment Kolesnikov (51.58); Pavel Tatarenko (51.78); Ivan Girev (50.69)	3:26.16	Germany; Tom Reuther (52.53); Daniel Pinneker (51.52); Josha Salchow (51.90); Johannes Hintze (50.25)	3:26.20	Hungary; István Végh (52.25); Márton Barta (51.65); Balázs Holló (51.60); Richárd Márton (50.90)	3:26.40
4×100m Medley Relay	Italy; Emanuel Fava; Nicolò Martinenghi; Andrea Facciola; Alberto Razzetti	3:46.15	Spain; Hugo González; Alejandro Raez Munoz; Arnau Honrubia Cerdá; Alex Ramos Fernandez	3:48.46	Poland; Kacper Stokowski; Rafal Krzysztof Kusto; Marcel Wagrowski; Antoni Kaluzynski	3:48.83
NYR = national youth record | NRU17 = national record under 17 years | NR16 = national record aged 16 | NR15 = national record aged 15

=== Girls' events ===
Games	Gold		Silver		Bronze	
50m Freestyle	Fanni Gyurinovics; Hungary	25.95	Janja Šegel; Slovenia	26.29	Loulou Janssen; Netherlands	26.40
100m Freestyle	Janja Šegel; Slovenia	56.85	Ajna Késely; Hungary	57.18	Nadia Gonzalez de Oliveira; Spain	57.42
200m Freestyle	Ajna Késely; Hungary	2:01.84	Janja Šegel; Slovenia	2:02.93	Nadia Gonzalez de Oliveira; Spain	2:04.60
400m Freestyle	Ajna Késely; Hungary	4:15.65	Antoinette Neamt; Ireland	4:16.61	Annalea Davison; Great Britain	5:19.33
800m Freestyle	Ajna Késely; Hungary	8:44.72	Petra Barocsai; Hungary	8:44.99	Antoinette Neamt; Ireland	8:47.12
100m Backstroke	Valeriya Egorova; Russia	1:03.93	Janja Jamšek; Slovenia	1:04.07	Ellinor Southward; Great Britain	1:04.41
200m Backstroke	Janja Jamšek; Slovenia	2:16.75	Tatiana Salcutan; Moldova	2:16.84	Sophie Hobbah; Great Britain	2:17.38
100m Breaststroke	Hannah Brunzell; Sweden	1:10.66	Tina Celik; Slovenia	1:11.26	Katie Robertson; Great Britain	1:11.45
200m Breaststroke	Anna Fehlinger; Germany	2:33.48	Hannah Brunzell; Sweden	2:34.47	Vanessa Cavagnoli; Italy	2:36.34
100m Butterfly	Petra Barocsai; Hungary	1:01.46	Ellen Walshe; Ireland	1:02.17	Charissa Jochems; Belgium	1:02.44
200m Butterfly	Ajna Késely; Hungary	2:15.04	Emily Large; Great Britain	2:16.20	Ariadna Escribano Trivino; Spain	2:17.24
200m Medley	Fanni Gyurinovics; Hungary	2:18.93	Yara Sophie Hierath; Germany	2:19.56	Sophie Hobbah; Great Britain	2:20.50
400m Medley	Maria Claudia Gadea; Romania	4:53.87	Rebecca Sutton; Great Britain	4:55.65	Celine Rieder; Germany	4:56.85
4×100m Freestyle Relay	Russia; Valeriia Sukhanova (56.68); Katarina Milutinovich (58.06); Marianna Bobrova (57.90); Iuliia Filippova (57.69)	3:50.33	Germany; Emily Feldboss (58.96); Yara Hierath (58.03); Sarah Wendt (58.97); Laura Rohrbach (57.88)	3:53.84	Turkey; Gizem Guvenc (58.48); Selen Ozbilen (58.49); Zehra-Duru Bilgin (58.58); Defne Kurt (58.35)	
4×100m Medley Relay	Slovenia; Janja Jamsek; Tina Celik; Pika Perenic; Janja Šegel	4:15.53	Great Britain; Ellinor Southward; Katie Robertson; Caitlin Hubbard; Rebecca Sutton	4:16.14	Russia; Valeriya Egorova; Ekaterina Mikhaylova; Aleksandra Denisenko; Katarina Milutinovich	4:16.66
NR = national record | NYR = national youth record | NR14 = national record aged 14

=== Mixed events ===
Games	Gold		Silver		Bronze	
4×100m Freestyle Relay	Spain; César Castro Valle; Alex Ramos Fernandez; Andrea Feng Prades Rodriguez; Nadia Gonzalez Oliveira	3:38.28	Germany; Daniel Pinneker; Laura Maialen Lydia Rohrbach; Yara Sophie Hierath; Johannes Hintze	3:38.41	Russia; Ivan Girev; Kliment Kolesnikov; Katarina Milutinovich; Iuliia Filippova	3:39.25
4×100m Medley Relay	Russia; Valeriya Egorova; Daniil Kitov; Egor Kuimov; Valeriia Sukhanova	3:58.49	Germany; Yara Sophie Hierath; Philipp Andre Brandt; Johannes Hintze; Emily Charlotte Feldvoss	4:02.43	Slovenia; Janja Jamšek; Dejan Steharnik; David Mihalic; Janja Šegel	4:03.03
