= Arjan Knipping =

Dutch swimmer (born 1994)

Personal information
- Full name: Arjan Antonius Knipping
- National team: Netherlands
- Born: 1 August 1994 (age 31) De Heurne, Netherlands
- Height: 175 cm (5 ft 9 in)
- Weight: 65 kg (143 lb)

Sport
- Sport: Swimming
- Strokes: Medley
- Club: PSV
- Coach: Geert Janssen

Arjan Knipping (born 1 August 1994) is a Dutch swimmer specialising in 200 and 400 metre individual medley. Knipping holds the Dutch national record on the 200 and 400 metre medley.

== Career ==
He represented the Netherlands at the 2019 World Aquatics Championships and reached the finals in both the 200 and 400 metre individual medley, setting a new national record in both events. With these results he also qualified for the 2020 Summer Olympics in Tokyo, Japan.

He also competed in the 2017 Summer Universiade and 2018 European Aquatics Championships.

== Personal bests ==
Short course
Event	Time	Date	Location
100 m medley	54.71	2021-07-04	Amsterdam, Netherlands
200 m medley	1:55.99	2019-12-06	Glasgow, United Kingdom
400 m medley	4:05.76	2019-12-05	Glasgow, United Kingdom

Long course
Event	Time	Date	Location
200 m medley	1:59.44 NR	2021-07-28	Tokyo, Japan
400 m freestyle	4:13.46 NR	2019-07-28	Gwangju, South Korea
