= Job Kienhuis =

Dutch swimmer (born 1989)

Personal information
- Full name: Job Kienhuis
- Nationality: Netherlands
- Born: 7 November 1989 (age 36) Denekamp
- Height: 190 cm (6 ft 3 in)
- Weight: 72.5 kg (160 lb)

Sport
- Sport: Swimming
- Strokes: freestyle
- Club: Nationaal Zweminstituut Eindhoven
Medal record
European Championships (SC)
Bronze medal – third place	2010 Eindhoven	1500 m freestyle

Job Kienhuis (born 7 November 1989) is a Dutch swimmer who mainly specializes in the middle- and long freestyle events. He is currently training under the guidance of former world champion Marcel Wouda alongside Olympic champion Hinkelien Schreuder. He holds 4 national records, the 800 m and 1500 m freestyle in both long course and short course.

== Swimming career ==
Kienhuis participated in the 2007 European Junior Swimming Championships in Antwerp, Belgium where ended 16th in the 400 m freestyle and 12th in the 1500 m freestyle. In the summer of 2008 he won a gold medal at the 2008 European Junior Open Water Swimming Championships in Sète, France.

In December 2008 at the Swim Cup Eindhoven 2008 he broke the national records in the 800 m and 1500 m freestyle, long course. Two weeks later at the national short course champions he lowered the national record at the 1500 m freestyle.

He won bronze in the 1500 m freestyle at the 2010 European Short Course Championships which was held in Eindhoven.

In 2012, he represented the Netherlands at the Olympics in the 1500 m freestyle but did not reach the final.

== Personal bests ==
Short course
Event	Time	Date	Location
400 m freestyle	3:43.56	8 December 2011	Szczecin, Poland
800 m freestyle	NR 7:44.33	18 December 2011	St Petersburg, Russia
1500 m freestyle	NR 14:30.14	18 December 2011	St Petersburg, Russia

Long course
Event	Time	Date	Location
400 m freestyle	3:53.21	26 July 2011	Shanghai, China
800 m freestyle	NR 7:51.92	8 April 2011	Eindhoven, Netherlands
1500 m freestyle	NR 14.58.34	4 December 2011	Eindhoven, Netherlands

== See also ==
- List of Dutch records in swimming
