= Swimming at the 2019 World Aquatics Championships – Men's 400 metre individual medley =

Men's 400 metre individual medley at the 2019 World Aquatics Championships
- Venue: Nambu University Municipal Aquatics Center
- Location: Gwangju, South Korea
- Dates: 27 July (heats and final)
- Competitors: 41 from 38 nations
- Winning time: 4:08.95

Medalists
gold medal	Daiya Seto	Japan
silver medal	Jay Litherland	United States
bronze medal	Lewis Clareburt	New Zealand

The Men's 400 metre individual medley competition at the 2019 World Championships was held on 28 July 2019.

== Records ==
Prior to the competition, the existing world and championship records were as follows.

World record	Michael Phelps (USA)	4:03.84	Beijing, China	10 August 2008
Competition record	Chase Kalisz (USA)	4:05.90	Budapest, Hungary	30 July 2017

== Results ==
=== Heats ===
The heats were held at 10:00.

Rank	Heat	Lane	Name	Nationality	Time	Notes
1	4	4	Daiya Seto	Japan	4:12.27	Q
2	5	8	Arjan Knipping	Netherlands	4:13.46	Q, NR
3	5	5	Jay Litherland	United States	4:13.78	Q
4	5	3	Max Litchfield	Great Britain	4:14.35	Q
5	4	7	Lewis Clareburt	New Zealand	4:14.56	Q
6	5	6	Maksym Shemberev	Azerbaijan	4:14.62	Q
7	4	2	Joan Lluís Pons	Spain	4:15.14	Q
8	5	7	Philip Heintz	Germany	4:15.24	Q, WD
9	4	3	Péter Bernek	Hungary	4:15.49	Q
10	5	4	Chase Kalisz	United States	4:15.62	
11	4	6	Brandonn Almeida	Brazil	4:15.92	
12	5	1	Thomas Fraser-Holmes	Australia	4:16.93	
13	4	5	Dávid Verrasztó	Hungary	4:16.95	
14	5	0	João Vital	Portugal	4:17.18	
15	3	3	Tristan Cote	Canada	4:17.22	
16	5	9	Dawid Szwedzki	Poland	4:17.48	
17	3	4	Tomas Peribonio	Ecuador	4:17.83	
18	3	2	Jarod Arroyo	Puerto Rico	4:18.94	NR
19	3	5	Ayrton Sweeney	South Africa	4:20.32	
20	4	8	Wang Hsing-hao	Chinese Taipei	4:21.65	
21	3	6	Kim Min-suk	South Korea	4:22.06	
22	3	7	Christoph Meier	Liechtenstein	4:22.56	
23	5	2	Wang Shun	China	4:23.23	
24	2	5	Denys Kesil	Ukraine	4:24.99	
25	3	8	Trần Hưng Nguyễn	Vietnam	4:25.49	
26	2	4	Aflah Prawira	Indonesia	4:26.49	
27	3	0	Svetlozar Nikolov	Bulgaria	4:26.88	
28	3	1	Raphaël Stacchiotti	Luxembourg	4:27.80	
29	2	6	Erick Gordillo	Guatemala	4:28.57	
30	3	9	Jaouad Syoud	Algeria	4:28.65	
31	2	2	Pang Sheng Jun	Singapore	4:28.93	
32	2	7	Brandon Schuster	Samoa	4:29.84	
33	2	3	Ahmed Hamdy	Egypt	4:30.17	
34	4	9	Wang Yizhe	China	4:31.14	
35	2	8	Alvi Hjelm	Faroe Islands	4:33.28	
36	1	3	Gustavo Gutiérrez	Peru	4:33.87	
37	1	4	Faang Der Tiaa	Malaysia	4:33.88	
38	2	1	Munzer Kabbara	Lebanon	4:35.58	
39	1	5	Simon Bachmann	Seychelles	4:41.42	
	4	0	Richard Nagy	Slovakia	DSQ	
	4	1	Patrick Stäber	Austria	DSQ	

=== Final ===
The final was held on 28 July at 21:01.

Rank	Lane	Name	Nationality	Time	Notes
1st place, gold medalist(s)	4	Daiya Seto	Japan	4:08.95	
2nd place, silver medalist(s)	3	Jay Litherland	United States	4:09.22	
3rd place, bronze medalist(s)	2	Lewis Clareburt	New Zealand	4:12.07	NR
4	1	Joan Lluís Pons	Spain	4:13.30	NR
5	8	Péter Bernek	Hungary	4:13.83	
6	7	Maksym Shemberev	Azerbaijan	4:14.10	
7	6	Max Litchfield	Great Britain	4:14.75	
8	5	Arjan Knipping	Netherlands	4:17.06	
