= Moldova at the 2013 World Aquatics Championships =

- Flag of Moldova
- FINA code: MDA
- National federation: Moldovan Swimming Federation
- Website: www.swimmingmoldova.org

in Barcelona, Spain
- Competitors: 3 in 1 sports
- Medals Ranked -th: Gold 0 Silver 0 Bronze 0 Total 0

World Aquatics Championships appearances
- 1994; 1998; 2001; 2003; 2005; 2007; 2009; 2011; 2013; 2015; 2017; 2019; 2022; 2023; 2024

Other related appearances
- Soviet Union (1973–1991)

Moldova competed at the 2013 World Aquatics Championships in Barcelona, Spain from 19 July to 4 August 2013.

== Swimming ==
Moldovan swimmers achieved qualifying standards in the following events (up to a maximum of 2 swimmers in each event at the A-standard entry time, and 1 at the B-standard):

Men

Athlete	Event	Heat		Semifinal		Final	
Athlete	Event	Time	Rank	Time	Rank	Time	Rank
Artiom Gladun	50 m backstroke	26.93	32	did not advance			
Artiom Gladun	100 m backstroke	58.60	39	did not advance			

Women

Athlete	Event	Heat		Semifinal		Final	
Athlete	Event	Time	Rank	Time	Rank	Time	Rank
Tatiana Chişca	50 m breaststroke	32.85	43	did not advance			
Tatiana Chişca	100 m breaststroke	1:14.11	47	did not advance			
Tatiana Perstniova	100 m backstroke	1:03.59	36	did not advance			
Tatiana Perstniova	200 m backstroke	2:17.19	31	did not advance			
