= 2024 World Aquatics Swimming Championships (25 m) – Men's 50 metre butterfly =

Swimming competition

Men's 50 metre butterfly at the 2024 World Aquatics Swimming Championships (25 m)
- Venue: Duna Arena
- Location: Budapest, Hungary
- Dates: 10 December (heats and semifinals); 11 December (final)
- Competitors: 84 from 79 nations
- Winning time: 21.32 WR

Medalists
gold medal	Noè Ponti	Switzerland
silver medal	Ilya Kharun	Canada
bronze medal	Nyls Korstanje	Netherlands

The men's 50 metre butterfly event at the 2024 World Aquatics Swimming Championships (25 m) was held from 10 to 11 December 2024 at the Duna Arena in Budapest, Hungary.

== Records ==
Prior to the competition, the existing world and championship records were as follows:

World record	Noè Ponti (SUI)	21.50	Singapore	2 November 2024
Competition record	Nicholas Santos (BRA)	21.78	Melbourne, Australia	14 December 2022

The following records were established during the competition:

Date	Round	Name	Nationality	Time	Record
10 December	Heat 8	Nyls Korstanje	Netherlands	21.62	CR
10 December	Heat 9	Noè Ponti	Switzerland	21.53	CR
10 December	Semifinal 2	Noè Ponti	Switzerland	21.43	WR
11 December	Final	Noè Ponti	Switzerland	21.32	WR

== Background ==
Switzerland’s Noè Ponti entered the event as the world record holder and favourite, having lowered the previous mark to 21.50 during the 2024 World Cup. Ponti swam under the old record four times across the three World Cup stops, including a 21.67 in Shanghai and 21.64 in Berlin. However, Canada’s Ilya Kharun had declared his intent to challenge the record and had shown strong form, including a 19.94 flat-start 50 free and a 22.28 personal best in the 50 fly. The Netherlands’ Nyls Korstanje became the second-fastest performer in history with a 21.74 in Singapore, after three runner-up finishes to Ponti. Returning finalists included Szebasztián Szabó of Hungary (21.86), Teong Tzen Wei of Singapore (22.11), Chad le Clos of South Africa, Dylan Carter of Trinidad and Tobago, Marius Kusch of Germany, and Daniel Zaitsev of Estonia. Australia’s Isaac Cooper showed consistent sub-22.5 form, while the USA’s Dare Rose and Michael Andrew, and Great Britain’s Jacob Peters (22.10), were also entered.

SwimSwam predicted Ponti would win, Kharun would place second, and Korstanje would place third.

== Results ==
=== Heats ===
The heats were started on 10 December at 10:25.

Rank	Heat	Lane	Name	Nationality	Time	Notes
1	9	4	Noè Ponti	Switzerland	21.53	Q, CR
2	8	4	Nyls Korstanje	Netherlands	21.62	Q, NR
3	6	3	Ilya Kharun	Canada	21.84	Q, NR
4	9	5	Tzen Wei Teong	Singapore	21.97	Q, =AS
5	7	6	Grigori Pekarski	Neutral Athletes A	22.08	Q, NR
6	9	6	Oleg Kostin	Neutral Athletes B	22.16	Q
7	7	4	Szebasztián Szabó	Hungary	22.18	Q
7	8	3	Dylan Carter	Trinidad and Tobago	22.18	Q
9	9	3	Roman Shevliakov	Neutral Athletes B	22.24	Q
10	8	1	Dare Rose	United States	22.26	Q
10	9	1	Guilherme Caribé	Brazil	22.26	Q
12	8	2	Michele Busa	Italy	22.28	Q
13	8	5	Jacob Peters	United Kingdom	22.35	Q
14	7	2	Daniel Zaitsev	Estonia	22.37	Q
15	7	5	Marius Kusch	Germany	22.39	Q
16	7	7	Matthew Temple	Australia	22.43	Q
17	9	7	Simon Bucher	Austria	22.49	R
18	8	7	Nikola Miljenic	Croatia	22.56	R
19	9	2	Thomas Verhoeven	Netherlands	22.60	
20	8	8	Michael Andrew	United States	22.65	
21	7	3	Isaac Cooper	Australia	22.66	
22	8	6	Chad le Clos	South Africa	22.67	
23	8	0	Durde Matic	Serbia	22.85	
24	6	7	Adilbek Mussin	Kazakhstan	22.90	
24	7	8	Kim Jihun	South Korea	22.90	
26	6	8	Jakub Majerski	Poland	22.93	
27	6	9	Jorge Otaiza	Venezuela	22.94	
28	9	0	Meiron Amir Cheruti	Israel	22.95	
29	7	0	Arsenii Kovalov	Ukraine	23.02	
30	6	4	Daniel Gracik	Czech Republic	23.03	
31	9	9	Lukas Edl	Austria	23.05	
32	7	1	Max McCusker	Ireland	23.09	
33	4	8	David Young	Fiji	23.11	NR
34	6	2	Emre Gurdenli	Turkey	23.12	
34	9	8	Abdelrahman Sameh	Egypt	23.12	
36	8	9	Mario Molla Yanes	Spain	23.16	
37	7	9	Nicholas Lia	Norway	23.17	
38	6	6	Christopher Elson	New Zealand	23.23	
39	5	3	Lamar Taylor	Bahamas	23.24	NR
40	6	1	Tibor Tistan	Slovakia	23.28	
41	5	9	Abdul Jabar Adama	Nigeria	23.56	
42	6	5	Anthony Puertas	Peru	23.57	
43	5	2	Bryan Leong Xin Ren	Malaysia	23.64	NR
44	6	0	Julien Henx	Luxembourg	23.69	
45	5	4	M.J.J. Mahmutoglu	Philippines	23.84	NR
45	5	7	Abeku Jackson	Ghana	23.84	
47	5	8	Grisi Koxhaku	Albania	23.86	NR
48	5	1	Milos Milenkovic	Montenegro	23.89	NR
49	5	5	Simon Statkevicius	Iceland	23.90	
50	5	6	Andrei Ungur	Romania	24.24	
51	5	0	Kokoro Frost	Samoa	24.25	NR
52	4	6	Jefferson Kpanou	Benin	24.49	NR
53	4	3	Benjamin Schnapp	Chile	24.59	
54	4	9	Jayden Elijah Asher Loran	Curaçao	24.85	
55	3	4	Nathan Fletcher	Grenada	24.87	
56	4	5	Chi Chong Lam	Macau	24.89	
57	3	3	Gerald Hernandez	Nicaragua	24.91	
58	2	7	C.P.A. Kelly	Barbados	24.96	
59	4	2	Mohamad Eyad Masoud	World Aquatics Refugee Team	24.98	
60	1	3	Daniyal Hatim	Pakistan	25.05	NR
61	4	0	Stephen Nyoike	Kenya	25.16	
62	3	5	Thomas Chen	Papua New Guinea	25.32	
63	4	1	Sidrell Williams	Jamaica	25.60	
64	2	0	Jonathan Bardales Essien	Saint Kitts and Nevis	25.80	
65	2	1	Ryong Hyon Kim	North Korea	25.89	
66	1	6	Daniil Mistriukov	Kyrgyzstan	26.15	
67	3	2	Ethan Hazell	Saint Lucia	26.37	
68	3	7	Abobakr Abass	Sudan	26.45	NR
69	2	6	Jonathan Raharvel	Madagascar	26.85	
70	3	1	Kinley Lhendup	Bhutan	27.34	
71	3	9	Nigel Fontenelle	Sint Maarten	27.89	
72	3	0	Charlie Gibbons	Palau	28.00	
73	2	2	Leo Nzimbi	Central African Republic	28.21	
74	3	8	Michael Mponezya Joseph	Tanzania	28.51	
75	2	5	Leo Lebot	Vanuatu	29.29	
76	1	5	Claudio Yelegou	Cameroon	29.48	
77	2	3	Higinio Ndong Obama	Equatorial Guinea	30.91	
	1	4	Jacques Ngoie Kazadi	Democratic Republic of the Congo	Did not start	
	2	4	Y.M.A. Nasser	Yemen	Did not start	
	2	8	Surafel Geremew Asfaw	Ethiopia	Did not start	
	2	9	Danilson Ie	Guinea-Bissau	Did not start	
	3	6	Ajal Kaji Tamrakar	Nepal	Did not start	
	4	4	Adam Moncherry	Seychelles	Did not start	
	4	7	Joash Mckonie	Zimbabwe	Did not start	

=== Semifinals ===
The semifinals were started on 10 December at 17:52.

Rank	Heat	Lane	Name	Nationality	Time	Notes
1	2	4	Noè Ponti	Switzerland	21.43	Q, WR
2	1	4	Nyls Korstanje	Netherlands	21.81	Q
3	2	5	Ilya Kharun	Canada	21.93	Q
4	2	8	Marius Kusch	Germany	21.99	Q
5	1	5	Tzen Wei Teong	Singapore	22.04	Q
6	2	3	Grigori Pekarski	Neutral Athletes A	22.05	Q, NR
7	1	7	Michele Busa	Italy	22.08	Q
8	2	6	Szebasztián Szabó	Hungary	22.09	Q
9	1	6	Dylan Carter	Trinidad and Tobago	22.16	R
10	2	7	Guilherme Caribé	Brazil	22.18	R
11	2	2	Roman Shevliakov	Neutral Athletes B	22.22	
12	1	2	Dare Rose	United States	22.25	
13	1	3	Oleg Kostin	Neutral Athletes B	22.26	
14	1	1	Daniel Zaitsev	Estonia	22.28	
15	2	1	Jacob Peters	United Kingdom	22.45	
16	1	8	Matthew Temple	Australia	22.50	

=== Final ===
The final were started on 11 December at 18:42.

Rank	Lane	Name	Nationality	Time	Notes
1st place, gold medalist(s)	4	Noè Ponti	Switzerland	21.32	WR
2nd place, silver medalist(s)	3	Ilya Kharun	Canada	21.67	AM
3rd place, bronze medalist(s)	5	Nyls Korstanje	Netherlands	21.68	
4	8	Szebasztián Szabó	Hungary	22.00	
5	1	Michele Busa	Italy	22.01	NR
6	7	Grigori Pekarski	Neutral Athletes A	22.06	
7	2	Tzen Wei Teong	Singapore	22.11	
8	6	Marius Kusch	Germany	22.17	
