= Moldova at the 2017 World Aquatics Championships =

- Flag of Moldova
- FINA code: MDA
- National federation: Moldovan Swimming Federation
- Website: www.swimmingmoldova.org

in Budapest, Hungary
- Competitors: 4 in 1 sport
- Medals: Gold 0 Silver 0 Bronze 0 Total 0

World Aquatics Championships appearances
- 1994; 1998; 2001; 2003; 2005; 2007; 2009; 2011; 2013; 2015; 2017; 2019; 2022; 2023; 2024

Other related appearances
- Soviet Union (1973–1991)

Moldova competed at the 2017 World Aquatics Championships in Budapest, Hungary, from 14 July to 30 July.

== Swimming ==
Moldova has received a Universality invitation from FINA to send a maximum of four swimmers (two men and two women) to the World Championships.

Athlete	Event	Heat		Semifinal		Final	
Athlete	Event	Time	Rank	Time	Rank	Time	Rank
Pavel Izbisciuc	Men's 50 m freestyle	23.23	58	did not advance			
Pavel Izbisciuc	Men's 50 m butterfly	24.80	45	did not advance			
Evghenii Paponin	Men's 50 m breaststroke	29.42	50	did not advance			
Evghenii Paponin	Men's 100 m breaststroke	1:05.16	=56	did not advance			
Alina Bulmag	Women's 100 m breaststroke	1:10.89	34	did not advance			
Alina Bulmag	Women's 200 m breaststroke	2:37.42	28	did not advance			
Tatiana Salcutan	Women's 100 m backstroke	1:03.08	37	did not advance			
Tatiana Salcutan	Women's 200 m backstroke	2:11.17	15 Q	2:11.27	15	did not advance	
Pavel Izbisciuc; Evghenii Paponin; Alina Bulmag; Tatiana Salcutan	Mixed 4×100 m medley relay	4:05.04	17	—		did not advance	
