= Moldova at the 2024 World Aquatics Championships =

- Flag of Moldova
- FINA code: MDA
- National federation: Water Kind of Sports Federation of the Republic of Moldova

in Doha, Qatar
- Competitors: 3 in 1 sport
- Medals: Gold 0 Silver 0 Bronze 0 Total 0

World Aquatics Championships appearances
- 1994; 1998; 2001; 2003; 2005; 2007; 2009; 2011; 2013; 2015; 2017; 2019; 2022; 2023; 2024

Other related appearances
- Soviet Union (1973–1991)

Moldova competed at the 2024 World Aquatics Championships in Doha, Qatar from 2 to 18 February.

== Competitors ==
The following is the list of competitors in the Championships.

Sport	Men	Women	Total
Swimming	2	1	3
Total	2	1	3

== Swimming ==
Moldova entered 3 swimmers.

Men

Athlete	Event	Heat		Semifinal		Final	
Athlete	Event	Time	Rank	Time	Rank	Time	Rank
Egor Covaliov	100 metre freestyle	51.94	57	Did not advance			
Egor Covaliov	200 metre freestyle	1:54.43	51	Did not advance			
Denis Svet	100 metre breaststroke	1:03.62	47	Did not advance			
Denis Svet	200 metre breaststroke	2:16.98	23	Did not advance			

Women

Athlete	Event	Heat		Semifinal		Final	
Athlete	Event	Time	Rank	Time	Rank	Time	Rank
Natalia Zaiteva	100 metre backstroke	1:04.50	35	Did not advance			
Natalia Zaiteva	200 metre backstroke	2:20.07	26	Did not advance			
