= Moldova at the 2023 World Aquatics Championships =

- Flag of Moldova
- FINA code: MDA
- National federation: Water Kind of Sports Federation of the Republic of Moldova

in Fukuoka, Japan
- Competitors: 3 in 1 sport
- Medals: Gold 0 Silver 0 Bronze 0 Total 0

World Aquatics Championships appearances
- 1994; 1998; 2001; 2003; 2005; 2007; 2009; 2011; 2013; 2015; 2017; 2019; 2022; 2023; 2024

Other related appearances
- Soviet Union (1973–1991)

Moldova competed at the 2023 World Aquatics Championships in Fukuoka, Japan from 14 to 30 July.

== Swimming ==
Moldova entered 3 swimmers.

Men

Athlete	Event	Heat		Semifinal		Final	
Athlete	Event	Time	Rank	Time	Rank	Time	Rank
Pavel Alovatki	200 metre freestyle	1:54.19	47	Did not advance			
Pavel Alovatki	400 metre freestyle	4:02.43	37	—		Did not advance	
Constantin Malachi	100 metre breaststroke	1:03.23	45	Did not advance			
Constantin Malachi	200 metre breaststroke	2:18.87	36	Did not advance			

Women

Athlete	Event	Heat		Semifinal		Final	
Athlete	Event	Time	Rank	Time	Rank	Time	Rank
Tatiana Salcuțan	100 metre backstroke	1:03.18	40	Did not advance			
Tatiana Salcuțan	200 metre backstroke	2:12.65	18	Did not advance			
