= Johannes Hintze =

German swimmer

Personal information
- Born: July 5, 1999 (age 27) Brandenburg an der Havel, Germany

Sport
- Sport: Swimming
- Strokes: Medley

Johannes Hintze (born 5 July 1999) is a German swimmer. Hintze placed 18th in the 400 metre individual medley at the 2016 Summer Olympics in Rio de Janeiro, Brazil.
