= Anton Down-Jenkins =

New Zealand diver (born 1999)

Personal information
- Nationality: New Zealand
- Born: 6 September 1999 (age 27) Wellington, New Zealand
- Education: University of North Carolina at Chapel Hill
- Height: 185 cm (6 ft 1 in)
- Weight: 84 kg (185 lb; 13 st 3 lb)

Sport
- Country: New Zealand
- Sport: Diving
- Events: Men's 3m, Men's 3m Synchronised, Mixed 3m Synchronised
- University team: South Carolina Gamecocks; North Carolina Tar Heels
- Partners: Elizabeth Cui, Liam Stone
- Coached by: Yaidel Gamboa

Achievements and titles
- Olympic finals: 8th - Men's 3m

Anton Down-Jenkins (born 6 September 1999) is a New Zealand Olympic diver who competed at the 2020 Summer Olympics.

Down-Jenkins got his Olympic quota for individual 3 m springboard at the 2021 Diving World Cup, Olympic Qualification Event, held in Tokyo, in May 2021. The Wellingtonian, who competes in the 3m springboard, placed 10th at the event, New Zealand's best ever finish at a Diving World Cup.

He competed in the individual 3m springboard event at the 2020 Summer Olympics in Tokyo, becoming the first male diver to compete for New Zealand at the Olympics since 1984. He is the first New Zealand diver to qualify for an Olympic final, finishing 8th out of 12 divers, from an original field of 29 in the competition.

Down-Jenkins represented New Zealand at the Gold Coast 2018 Commonwealth Games where he placed 8th in the 3m synchronised and 14th in the individual 3m springboard.

Down-Jenkins is Māori; his iwi affiliation is Te Arawa.

He is now based at the University of North Carolina. He is gay.
