= Moldova at the 2011 World Aquatics Championships =

- Flag of Moldova
- FINA code: MDA
- National federation: Moldovan Swimming Federation
- Website: www.swimmingmoldova.org

in Shanghai, China
- Competitors: 3 in 1 sports
- Medals Ranked -th: Gold 0 Silver 0 Bronze 0 Total 0

World Aquatics Championships appearances
- 1994; 1998; 2001; 2003; 2005; 2007; 2009; 2011; 2013; 2015; 2017; 2019; 2022; 2023; 2024

Other related appearances
- Soviet Union (1973–1991)

Moldova competed at the 2011 World Aquatics Championships in Shanghai, China between July 16 and 31, 2011.

== Swimming ==
Moldova qualified 3 swimmers.

Men

Athlete	Event	Heats		Semifinals		Final	
Athlete	Event	Time	Rank	Time	Rank	Time	Rank
Serghei Golban	Men's 50m Freestyle	24.23	50	did not advance			
Serghei Golban	Men's 50m Butterfly	25.37	34	did not advance			

Women

Athlete	Event	Heats		Semifinals		Final	
Athlete	Event	Time	Rank	Time	Rank	Time	Rank
Tatiana Perstneva	Women's 100m Backstroke	1:05.35	45	did not advance			
Tatiana Perstneva	Women's 200m Backstroke	2:21.25	36	did not advance			
Evghenia Tanasienco	Women's 100m Breaststroke	1:11.03	29	did not advance			
Evghenia Tanasienco	Women's 200m Breaststroke	2:34.00	28	did not advance			
