= Moldova at the 2022 World Aquatics Championships =

- Flag of Moldova
- FINA code: MDA
- National federation: Moldovan Swimming Federation
- Website: www.swimmingmoldova.org

in Budapest, Hungary
- Medals: Gold 0 Silver 0 Bronze 0 Total 0

World Aquatics Championships appearances
- 1994; 1998; 2001; 2003; 2005; 2007; 2009; 2011; 2013; 2015; 2017; 2019; 2022; 2023; 2024

Other related appearances
- Soviet Union (1973–1991)

Moldova competed at the 2022 World Aquatics Championships in Budapest, Hungary from 17 June to 3 July.

== Swimming ==
Moldova entered three swimmers.

Men

Athlete	Event	Heat		Semifinal		Final	
Athlete	Event	Time	Rank	Time	Rank	Time	Rank
Pavel Alovatki	200 m freestyle	1:51.64	43	did not advance			
Pavel Alovatki	400 m freestyle	3:55.64	28	—		did not advance	
Constantin Malachi	50 m breaststroke	28.43	31	did not advance			
Constantin Malachi	200 m breaststroke	2:16.25	28	did not advance			

Women

Athlete	Event	Heat		Semifinal		Final	
Athlete	Event	Time	Rank	Time	Rank	Time	Rank
Tatiana Salcuțan	200 m backstroke	2:13.45	14 Q	2:14.10	14	did not advance	
