= Nyls Korstanje =

Dutch swimmer (born 1999)

Personal information
- Nationality: Dutch
- Born: 5 February 1999 (age 27) Sneek, Netherlands
- Height: 1.88 m (6 ft 2 in)
- Weight: 76 kg (168 lb)

Sport
- Sport: Swimming
- Strokes: Freestyle; Butterfly
- Club: North Carolina State University
- Coach: Braden Holloway (NC State)
Medal record
Men's swimming
Representing the Netherlands
World Championships (LC)
Silver medal – second place	2024 Doha	4×100 m medley
Bronze medal – third place	2022 Budapest	4×100 m mixed medley
World Championships (SC)
Silver medal – second place	2016 Windsor	4×50 m mixed freestyle
Bronze medal – third place	2022 Melbourne	4×50 m freestyle
Bronze medal – third place	2022 Melbourne	4×50 m mixed freestyle
Bronze medal – third place	2024 Budapest	50 m butterfly
European Championships (LC)
Gold medal – first place	2022 Rome	4×100 m mixed medley
Silver medal – second place	2018 Glasgow	4×100 m mixed freestyle
Silver medal – second place	2020 Budapest	4×100 m mixed medley
European Championships (SC)
Gold medal – first place	2019 Glasgow	4×50 m mixed freestyle
European Youth Olympic Festival
Gold medal – first place	2015 Tbilisi	50 m freestyle
Silver medal – second place	2015 Tbilisi	100 m freestyle

Nyls Korstanje (born 5 February 1999) is a Dutch swimmer who competed for North Carolina State University and represented the Netherlands in the 2020 Tokyo and 2024 Paris Olympics. A prolific swimmer in international competition, he won two golds at the European Championships, with one in the 4x50 mixed freestyle relay in Glasgow in 2019, and one in the 4x100 mixed medley in Rome in 2022. In Long and Short Course competition, at the World Championships between 2016 and 2024, he won two silver and four bronze medals.

Korstanje was born 5 February 1999 in Sneek, Netherlands, and attended High School at Sint Joris College Eindhoven.

== North Carolina State ==
During his collegiate years, he competed for North Carolina State University under Head Coach Braden Holloway. At NC State, in 2023, he was an NCAA Champion in the 200 medley relay. He was an All American at NC State twenty-two times from 2019 to 2023, in various years in the 50 and 100 freestyle, the 100 butterfly, the 200 and 400 freestyle relay, and the 400 medley relay. Korstanje was an Atlantic Coast Conference (ACC) Champion a total of 11 times from 2019 to 2023. In 2019, he was a conference champion in the 200 and 400 medley relay, and the 200 freestyle relay. In 2020, he was a conference champion in the 50 and 100 freestyle, and both the 200 medley relay and the 400 freestyle relay. In 2022, he was again a conference champion in the 400 medley relay, and in 2023 was a conference champion in the 200 medley relay, the 200 freestyle relay, and the 400 medley relay.

Outstanding in both freestyle, and butterfly, Korstanje was rated second in NC State all-time event standings in both the 50 Freestyle and 100 Butterfly events. Recognized for his achievements in his first year at NC State in 2019, he was an Atlantic Coast Conference All-Conference Men's Freshman of the Year. A solid student, in 2019, 2022, and 2023, he was part of the Academic All-ACC Team, and in 2020 was a College Swimming Coaches's of America Association (CSCAA) Scholar All-American.

== International career ==
Korstanje helped set a new European record in the 4×50 meter freestyle mixed relay event in Copenhagen, Denmark on 16 December 2017 of 1:28.39. The medal held through 7 December 2019.

He competed in the 4 × 100 m mixed freestyle relay event at the 2018 European Aquatics Championships in Glasgow, Scotland, winning the silver medal. As shown in his Medal Record at right, in the 2016, 2022, and 2024 World Aquatics Long and Short Course Championships, he won a total of two silver and four bronze medals in the 4x50 freestyle and 4x50 mixed freestyle relay events and the 4x100 medley and mixed medley relay events, as well as the 50 meter butterfly. In the European Long and Short Course Championships he won two golds and two silvers in 2018, 2019, 2020, and 2022 in the 4x50 and 4x100 mixed freestyle and mixed medley events.

== Olympics ==
=== 2020 Tokyo ===
At the 2020 Tokyo Olympics, he placed sixth in the mixed 4x100 medley relay with a combined team time of 3:41.25, and twelfth in both the 4x100 meter freestyle relay where his team recorded a combined time of 3:14.07 and the 100 meter butterfly where he swam a 51.80, around 2.35 seconds behind American gold medalist Caleb Dressel.

=== 2024 Paris ===
Improving his finishes at the 2024 Paris Olympics in early August while again competing for the Netherlands, he placed sixth in the men's 100-meter butterfly with a time of 50.83. His relay team placed eighth in the men's 4x100 medley relay where he swam the third leg with the Dutch team of Kai Van Westering, Caspar Korbeau, and Stan Pijenberg, recording a combined time in the finals of 3:32.52. He placed sixth in the mixed 4x100 meter medley relay with a combined time of 3:43.12.

== Personal bests ==
Short course
Event	Time	Date	Location
50 m freestyle	21.17	2022-07-02	Amsterdam, Netherlands
100 m freestyle	46.91	2022-07-03	Amsterdam, Netherlands
50 m butterfly	22.25 NR	2022-07-03	Amsterdam, Netherlands
100 m butterfly	49.49 NR	2022-07-02	Amsterdam, Netherlands

Long course
Event	Time	Date	Location
50 m freestyle	21.98	2020-12-03	Rotterdam, Netherlands
100 m freestyle	48.86	2021-05-17	Budapest, Hungary
50 m butterfly	22.88 NR	2022-08-11	Rome, Italy
100 m butterfly	51.41 NR	2021-06-23	Budapest, Hungary
