= Pavel Izbisciuc =

Moldovan swimmer

Personal information
- Born: 10 July 1995 (age 30)

Sport
- Sport: Swimming

Pavel Izbisciuc (born 10 July 1995) is a Moldovan butterfly swimmer. He competed in the men's 50 metre butterfly event at the 2017 World Aquatics Championships.
