= Royal Dutch Swimming Federation =

Official governing body for swimming in the Netherlands

Koninklijke Nederlandse Zwem Bond (Royal Dutch Swimming Federation)
- Abbreviation: KNZB
- Formation: 14 August 1888 (137 years ago)
- Type: Federation of national associations
- Headquarters: Nieuwegein, Netherlands
- Region served: Netherlands
- Official language: Dutch
- President: Hayke Veldman
- General Secretary: Arnoud Strijbis
- Affiliations: FINA; LEN; NOC*NSF
- Website: www.knzb.nl

The Royal Dutch Swimming Federation (Dutch: Koninklijke Nederlandse Zwem Bond, “KNZB”) is the official governing body for swimming, in the Netherlands. The federation overlooks several other sports including competition swimming, open water swimming, water polo, diving and synchronized swimming. The federation is based in Nieuwegein and affiliated with the national sports body NOC*NSF. The responsibility of the KNZB is to organize and track various events. When a new organization from one of the water sports joins the KNZB they can participate in the competitions governed by the KNZB. They will then be placed on a ranking list.

== History ==
The KNZB was founded on August 14, 1888 by four collaborating swim organizations. At this time the federations responsibility covered only five swim clubs

- Arnhemse Zwemclub,
- Goudse Zwemclub,
- Hollandse Dames Zwemclub,
- Leidsche Zwem Club (later LZ 1886)
- AZ 1870 (Amsterdamse Zwemclub)

In 1888 the federation was named Nederlandse Zwem Bond (“NZB” English: Dutch Swimming Federation). In 1933, federation was renamed to the KNZB gaining the word Koninklijk (Royal in Dutch). In 1909 the KNZB joined the world swimming governing body, FINA which was established one year earlier.

== Competition Swimming ==
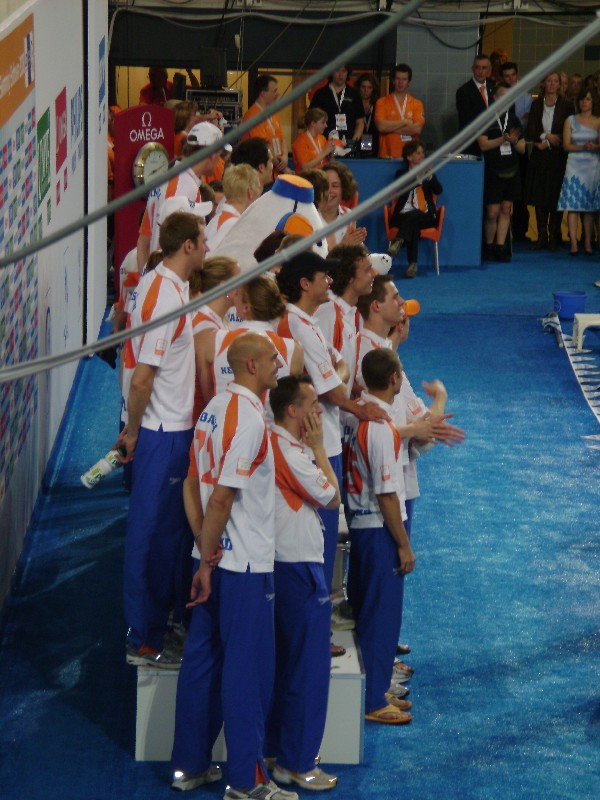
Dutch National Swim Team

Competition swimming is considered a top sport in the Netherlands where swimmers such as Pieter van den Hoogenband, Inge de Bruijn, and Ranomi Kromowidjojo have brought home Olympic success. All Dutch swimming records are ratified by the KNZB. Virtually all swim clubs of the Netherlands are member of the KNZB. Membership benefits include the right to participate in competitions, discounts to attend courses and liability insurance.

=== Competitions ===
There are two national competitions that the KNZB governs. They are:

- National Swim Competition
- KNZB Long Distance Circuit

The objective of the National Swim Competition is for all swim clubs affiliated with the KNZB to participate in a competition against other KNZB clubs with more or less equal strength.

The KNZB Long Distance Circuit is designed to simulate swimming over an extended length. The competition promotes swimmers to practice longer distances. Simplified regulations for the individual makes the competition more attractive.

=== Officials ===
In order to keep the games fair, all judges are trained under the material of the KNZB. This system uses a ladder style chart for grading officials. Where officials must meet certain requirements before they can move to the next level.

Official	Qualification	Rights
Referee	1	The official holds the head power to the game. The official has the ability to disqualify participants and impose sanctions if necessary. In order to obtain this qualification, one must first obtain the 3, J and K qualifications.
Starter	2	The starter blows the whistle to start a race The official has the ability to call a false start. In order to obtain this qualification the person must be of 16 years of older.
Umpire	K	The official checks that all swimmers follow the regulations by walking alongside the swimmers. In order to obtain this qualification, one must first obtain the 3 and J qualifications.
Jury Secretary	J	The official processes the swum times into the computer and ensures the timers are working properly. In order to obtain this qualification the person must be of 16 years of older.
Turn Commissioner; Time Keeper	3	An official with qualification 3 may function in both international and national competitions. In order to obtain this qualification, one must hold qualification 4 for over one year and have officiated 10 competitions or more. obtain the 3 and J qualifications.
Turn Commissioner; Time Keeper	4	The official checks that all swimmers follow the regulations on the turn. In order to obtain this qualification the person must be of 16 years of older at the time of the exam.
Based on competition regulations (revised June 2011)

== Water Polo ==
All water polo games that are associated with the KNZB are eligible to partake in the national league games. The league games determine the ranking of the club.

== Diving ==
The KNZB currently has three competitions set up for diving, in which are:

- KNZB All In Competition

This competition is classified as the qualification NK-Al.

- KNZB Youth Competition

This competition is classified as the qualification NJK.

- Recreational Competition
