= List of Dutch records in swimming =

Below is the complete list of the Dutch records in swimming, which are ratified by the Royal Dutch Swimming Federation (KNZB).

== Long course (50 m) ==
=== Men ===
Event	Time		Name	Club	Date	Meet	Location	Ref
50 m freestyle	21.56	h	Sean Niewold	Albion	5 July 2026	Dutch European Trials	Eindhoven, Netherlands	
100 m freestyle	47.68	sf	Pieter van den Hoogenband	Netherlands	13 August 2008	Olympic Games	Beijing, China	
200 m freestyle	1:44.89		Pieter van den Hoogenband	Netherlands	2 August 2002	European Championships	Berlin, Germany	
400 m freestyle	3:47.09		Maarten Brzoskowski	Netherlands	16 May 2016	European Championships	London, Great Britain	
800 m freestyle	7:51.92		Job Kienhuis	Eiffel Swimmers PSV	8 April 2011	Swim Cup	Eindhoven, Netherlands	
1500 m freestyle	14:58.34		Job Kienhuis	Eiffel Swimmers PSV	4 December 2011	Dutch Nationals	Eindhoven, Netherlands	
5000 m freestyle	54:06.88		Maarten van der Weijden	Netherlands	15 Feb 2008	Open Water World Championship Trials	Eindhoven, Netherlands	
50 m backstroke	24.73		Bastiaan Lijesen	Eiffel Swimmers PSV	5 April 2013	Eindhoven Swim Cup	Eindhoven, Netherlands	
100 m backstroke	53.51	h	Kai van Westering	Netherlands	12 June 2025	Dutch Championships	Amersfoort, Netherlands	
200 m backstroke	1:56.85	sf	Nick Driebergen	Netherlands	30 Jul 2009	World Championships	Rome, Italy	
50m breaststroke	26.62		Koen de Groot	Netherlands	15 August 2026	European Championships	Paris, France	
100m breaststroke	57.80	h	Arno Kamminga	Netherlands	24 July 2021	Olympic Games	Tokyo, Japan	
200m breaststroke	2:06.85		Arno Kamminga	HPC - De Dolfijn	4 December 2020	Rotterdam Qualification Meet	Rotterdam, Netherlands	
50m butterfly	22.69		Sean Niewold	Albion	2 July 2026	Dutch European Trials	Eindhoven, Netherlands	
100m butterfly	50.59	sf	Nyls Korstanje	Netherlands	2 August 2024	Olympic Games	Paris, France	
200m butterfly	1:56.59		Joeri Verlinden	Netherlands	28 July 2009	World Championships	Rome, Italy	
200m individual medley	1:59.44	h	Arjan Knipping	Netherlands	28 July 2021	Olympic Games	Tokyo, Japan	
400m individual medley	4:13.46	h	Arjan Knipping	Netherlands	28 July 2019	World Championships	Gwangju, South Korea	
4×50m freestyle relay	1:28.34		Mark Veens; Gijs Damen; Klaas-Erik Zwering; Pieter van den Hoogenband	-	28 March 2004	-	Eindhoven, Netherlands	
4×100m freestyle relay	3:13.79		Nyls Korstanje (48.86); Stan Pijnenburg (47.79); Thom de Boer (49.03); Jesse Puts (48.11)	Netherlands	17 May 2021	European Championships	Budapest, Hungary	
4×200m freestyle relay	7:07.82		Dion Dreesens (1:47.92); Maarten Brzoskowski (1:46.55); Kyle Stolk (1:47.88); Sebastiaan Verschuren (1:45.47)	Netherlands	21 May 2016	European Championships	London, Great Britain	
4×50m medley relay	1:41.57		Ensger Kotterink (27.08); Perry Laarhoven (28.94); Thomas Verhoeven (23.30); Sean Niewold (22.25)	Rijnhaeghe	27 February 2022	Blue Marlins Qualification Meet	The Hague, Netherlands	
4×100m medley relay	3:31.07	h	Kai van Westering (53.89); Caspar Corbeau (58.60); Nyls Korstanje (51.11); Sean Niewold (47.47)	Netherlands	3 August 2025	World Championships	Singapore, Singapore	

Legend: # – Record awaiting ratification by KNZB; WR – World record; ER – European record; e – equalled existing record;
Records not set in finals: h – heat; sf – semifinal; r – relay 1st leg; rh – relay heat 1st leg; b – B final; † – en route to final mark; so – swim-off; tt – time trial

=== Women ===
Event	Time		Name	Club	Date	Meet	Location	Ref
50m freestyle	23.85		Ranomi Kromowidjojo	Netherlands	30 July 2017	World Championships	Budapest, Hungary	
100m freestyle	51.68	WR	Marrit Steenbergen	Netherlands	27 June 2026	Sette Colli Trophy	Rome, Italy	
200m freestyle	1:54.65		Marrit Steenbergen	Netherlands	13 August 2026	European Championships	Paris, France	
400m freestyle	4:03.02		Sharon van Rouwendaal	Netherlands	2 August 2015	World Championships	Kazan, Russia	
800m freestyle	8:24.12		Sharon van Rouwendaal	Netherlands	8 August 2015	World Championships	Kazan, Russia	
1500m freestyle	16:03.37		Sharon van Rouwendaal	Netherlands	9 July 2015	Romanian Open Championships	Bucharest, Romania	
5000m freestyle	56:23.05		Sharon van Rouwendaal	AAS Sarcelles Natation 95	7 February 2015	13th French Championships 5 km Indoor	Sarcelles, France	
50m backstroke	27.10		Kira Toussaint	De Dolfijn	10 April 2021	Eindhoven Qualification Meet	Eindhoven, Netherlands	
100m backstroke	58.33		Marrit Steenbergen	Team NL - PSV	2 July 2026	Dutch European Trials	Eindhoven, Netherlands	
200m backstroke	2:07.78		Sharon van Rouwendaal	Netherlands	30 July 2011	World Championships	Shanghai, China	
50m breaststroke	30.38	sf	Moniek Nijhuis	Netherlands	1 Aug 2009	World Championships	Rome, Italy	
100m breaststroke	1:05.71	h	Tes Schouten	HPC - BZ&PC	9 April 2023	Eindhoven Qualification Meet	Eindhoven, Netherlands	
200m breaststroke	2:19.81		Tes Schouten	Netherlands	16 February 2024	World Championships	Doha, Qatar	
50m butterfly	25.24		Ranomi Kromowidjojo	Netherlands	13 March 2021	HPC Training Meet	Amsterdam, Netherlands	
100m butterfly	56.61		Inge de Bruijn	Netherlands	17 Sep 2000	Olympic Games	Sydney, Australia	
200m butterfly	2:08.74		Sharon van Rouwendaal	AAS Sarcelles Natation 95	2 April 2015	French Championships	Limoges, France	
200m individual medley	2:08.86		Marrit Steenbergen	Team NL - PSV	13 April 2024	Eindhoven Qualification Meet	Eindhoven, Netherlands	
400m individual medley	4:44.28	h	Marrit Steenbergen	HPC - PSV	7 April 2023	Eindhoven Qualification Meet	Eindhoven, Netherlands	
4×50m freestyle relay	1:39.15		Inge Dekker; Hinkelien Schreuder; Chantal Groot; Marleen Veldhuis	-	27 March 2005	Dutch Open Swim Cup	Eindhoven, Netherlands	
4×100m freestyle relay	3:31.72	ER	Inge Dekker (53.61); Ranomi Kromowidjojo (52.30); Femke Heemskerk (53.03); Marleen Veldhuis (52.78)	Netherlands	26 July 2009	World Championships	Rome, Italy	
4×200m freestyle relay	7:52.06		Marrit Steenbergen (1:57.95); Esmee Vermeulen (1:58.67); Robin Neumann (1:59.38); Femke Heemskerk (1:56.06)	Netherlands	6 April 2016	Swim Cup	Eindhoven, Netherlands	
4×50m medley relay	1:51.38		Hinkelien Schreuder; Moniek Nijhuis; Inge Dekker; Chantal Groot	-	23 April 2006	Dutch Open Swim Cup	Eindhoven, Netherlands	
4×100m medley relay	3:57.01		Kira Toussaint (1:00.29); Tes Schouten (1:06.75); Maaike de Waard (57.74); Marrit Steenbergen (52.23)	Netherlands	17 August 2022	European Championships	Rome, Italy	

Legend: # – Record awaiting ratification by KNZB; WR – World record; ER – European record; e – equalled existing record;
Records not set in finals: h – heat; sf – semifinal; r – relay 1st leg; rh – relay heat 1st leg; b – B final; † – en route to final mark; so – swim-off; tt – time trial

=== Mixed relay ===
Event	Time	Name	Club	Date	Meet	Location	Ref
4×100 m freestyle relay	3:20.09	Sean Niewold (47.95); Merlin Belmon (48.55); Milou van Wijk (52.85); Marrit Steenbergen (50.74)	Netherlands	14 August 2026	European Championships	Paris, France	
4×200 m freestyle relay	7:32.39	Kyle Stolk (1:48.64); Stan Pijnenburg (1:47.79); Femke Heemskerk (1:56.13); Robin Neumann (1:59.83)	Netherlands	4 August 2018	European Championships	Glasgow, Great Britain	
4×100 m medley relay	3:40.92	Maaike de Waard (59.89); Caspar Corbeau (59.03); Sean Niewold (51.13); Marrit Steenbergen (50.87)	Netherlands	11 August 2026	European Championships	Paris, France	

Legend: # – Record awaiting ratification by KNZB; WR – World record; ER – European record; e – equalled existing record;
Records not set in finals: h – heat; so – swim-off

== Short course (25 m) ==
=== Men ===
Event	Time		Name	Club	Date	Meet	Location	Ref
50m freestyle	20.63	sf	Nyls Korstanje	Netherlands	14 December 2024	World Championships	Budapest, Hungary	
100m freestyle	46.36	b	Sean Niewold	TriVia	24 October 2026	Dutch Qualifiers	Rotterdam, Netherlands	
200m freestyle	1:41.89		Pieter van den Hoogenband	Netherlands	14 December 2003	European Championships	Dublin, Ireland	
400m freestyle	3:38.33		Luc Kroon	Netherlands	2 November 2021	European Championships	Kazan, Russia	
800m freestyle	7:44.18		Luc Kroon	Ed-Vo	21 December 2019	Dutch Championships	Tilburg, Netherlands	
1500m freestyle	14:30.14		Job Kienhuis	Netherlands	18 December 2011	Vladimir Salnikov's Cup	Saint Petersburg, Russia	
50m backstroke	23.63	r	Nick Driebergen	Netherlands	10 December 2009	European Championships	Istanbul, Turkey	
100m backstroke	50.97		Kai van Westering	HPC - PSV	23 October 2026	Dutch Qualifiers	Rotterdam, Netherlands	
200m backstroke	1:51.59		Kai van Westering	HPC - PSV	22 October 2026	Dutch Qualifiers	Rotterdam, Netherlands	
50m breaststroke	25.52		Caspar Corbeau	Netherlands	18 October 2025	World Cup	Westmont, United States	
100m breaststroke	55.54	h	Caspar Corbeau	Netherlands	2 December 2025	European Championships	Lublin, Poland	
200m breaststroke	1:59.52	WR	Caspar Corbeau	Netherlands	25 October 2025	World Cup	Toronto, Canada	
50m butterfly	21.62	h	Nyls Korstanje	Netherlands	10 December 2024	World Championships	Budapest, Hungary	
100m butterfly	48.99		Nyls Korstanje	Netherlands	24 October 2024	World Cup	Incheon, South Korea	
200m butterfly	1:51.36		Joeri Verlinden	Netherlands	12 December 2009	European Championships	Istanbul, Turkey	
100m individual medley	51.78	h	Caspar Corbeau	Netherlands	23 October 2025	World Cup	Toronto, Canada	
200m individual medley	1:54.33	h	Kyle Stolk	Netherlands	6 August 2017	World Cup	Berlin, Germany	
400m individual medley	4:04.20		Thomas Jansen	Netherlands	17 October 2026	World Cup	Astana, Kazakhstan	
4×50m freestyle relay	1:22.89		Jesse Puts (21.10); Stan Pijnenburg (20.74); Kenzo Simons (20.59); Thom de Boer (20.46)	Netherlands	2 November 2021	European Championships	Kazan, Russia	
4×100m freestyle relay	3:06.10		Stan Pijnenburg (46.64); Thom de Boer (46.60); Nyls Korstanje (46.82); Jesse Puts (46.04)	Netherlands	16 December 2021	World Championships	Abu Dhabi, United Arab Emirates	
4×200m freestyle relay	6:58.55	h	Dion Dreesens (1:44.86); Maarten Brzoskowski (1:44.56); Ben Schwietert (1:45.32); Kyle Stolk (1:43.81)	Netherlands	9 December 2016	World Championships	Windsor, Canada	
4×50m medley relay	1:32.16		Stan Pijnenburg (23.80); Arno Kamminga (25.48); Jesse Puts (22.56); Thom de Boer (20.32)	Netherlands	3 November 2021	European Championships	Kazan, Russia	
4×100m medley relay	3:26.59		Stan Pijnenburg (53.61); Arno Kamminga (56.14); Nyls Korstanje (50.48); Luc Kroon (46.36)	Netherlands	21 December 2021	World Championships	Abu Dhabi, United Arab Emirates	

Legend: # – Record awaiting ratification by KNZB; WR – World record; ER – European record; e – equalled existing record;
Records not set in finals: h – heat; sf – semifinal; r – relay 1st leg; rh – relay heat 1st leg; b – B final; † – en route to final mark; so – swim-off; tt – time trial

=== Women ===
Event	Time		Name	Club	Date	Meet	Location	Ref
50 m freestyle	22.93	ER	Ranomi Kromowidjojo	Netherlands	7 August 2017	World Cup	Berlin, Germany	
100 m freestyle	50.32	ER	Marrit Steenbergen	Netherlands	10 October 2026	World Cup	Tashkent, Uzbekistan	
200 m freestyle	1:50.23	ER	Marrit Steenbergen	Netherlands	15 October 2026	World Cup	Astana, Kazakhstan	
400 m freestyle	3:57.76		Sharon van Rouwendaal	Netherlands	5 December 2014	World Championships	Doha, Qatar	
800 m freestyle	8:08.17		Sharon van Rouwendaal	Netherlands	4 December 2014	World Championships	Doha, Qatar	
1500 m freestyle	15:48.67		Sharon van Rouwendaal	Netherlands	22 November 2014	French Championships	Montpellier, France	
50m backstroke	25.47	r, ER	Marrit Steenbergen	Netherlands	7 December 2025	European Championships	Lublin, Poland	
100m backstroke	55.17	sf, =	Kira Toussaint	Netherlands	4 December 2019	European Championships	Glasgow, Great Britain	
100m backstroke	55.17	=	Marrit Steenbergen	Netherlands	2 October 2026	World Cup	Baku, Azerbaijan	
200m backstroke	2:01.26		Kira Toussaint	Netherlands	4 November 2021	European Championships	Kazan, Russia	
50m breaststroke	29.62	h	Moniek Nijhuis	Netherlands	3 December 2014	World Championships	Doha, Qatar	
100m breaststroke	1:03.90		Tes Schouten	Netherlands	15 December 2022	World Championships	Melbourne, Australia	
200m breaststroke	2:16.09		Tes Schouten	Netherlands	8 December 2023	European Championships	Otopeni, Romania	
50m butterfly	24.44		Ranomi Kromowidjojo	Netherlands	19 December 2021	World Championships	Abu Dhabi, United Arab Emirates	
100m butterfly	54.66		Tessa Giele	Netherlands	14 December 2024	World Championships	Budapest, Hungary	
200m butterfly	2:05.40		Tessa Giele	Feijenoord Albion Zwemclub	22 December 2024	Dutch Championships	Den Haag, Netherlands	
100m individual medley	56.18	ER	Marrit Steenbergen	Netherlands	8 October 2026	World Cup	Tashkent, Uzbekistan	
200m individual medley	2:01.83	ER	Marrit Steenbergen	Netherlands	6 December 2025	European Championships	Lublin, Poland	
400m individual medley	4:31.08		Marrit Steenbergen	Psv	7 November 2026	KNZB Competition Round 2 – Eredivisie	Eindhoven, Netherlands	
4×50m freestyle relay	1:32.50	tt, WR	Ranomi Kromowidjojo (23.05); Maaike de Waard (23.16); Kim Busch (23.47); Femke Heemskerk (22.82)	Eiffel Swimmers PSV	12 December 2020	Wouda Cup	Eindhoven, Netherlands	
4×100m freestyle relay	3:26.53	ER	Inge Dekker (52.39); Femke Heemskerk (50.58); Maud van der Meer (52.55); Ranomi Kromowidjojo (51.01)	Netherlands	5 December 2014	World Championships	Doha, Qatar	
4×200m freestyle relay	7:32.85	ER	Inge Dekker (1:54.73); Femke Heemskerk (1:51.22); Ranomi Kromowidjojo (1:54.17); Sharon van Rouwendaal (1:52.73)	Netherlands	3 December 2014	World Championships	Doha, Qatar	
4×50m medley relay	1:42.69		Hinkelien Schreuder (26.32); Moniek Nijhuis (29.16); Inge Dekker (24.51); Ranomi Kromowidjojo (22.70)	Netherlands	12 Dec 2009	European Championships	Istanbul, Turkey	
4×100m medley relay	3:47.70		Kira Toussaint (56.53); Tes Schouten (1:05.28); Maaike de Waard (55.42); Marrit Steenbergen (50.47)	Netherlands	18 December 2022	World Championships	Melbourne, Australia	

Legend: # – Record awaiting ratification by KNZB; WR – World record; ER – European record; e – equalled existing record;
Records not set in finals: h – heat; sf – semifinal; r – relay 1st leg; rh – relay heat 1st leg; b – B final; † – en route to final mark; so – swim-off; tt – time trial

=== Mixed relay ===
Event	Time		Name	Club	Date	Meet	Location	Ref
4×50 m freestyle relay	1:28.39		Nyls Korstanje (21.42); Kyle Stolk (20.66); Ranomi Kromowidjojo (23.01); Femke Heemskerk (23.30)	Netherlands	16 December 2017	European Championships	Copenhagen, Denmark	
4×50 m medley relay	1:36.18	=	Kira Toussaint (25.99); Arno Kamminga (25.54); Maaike de Waard (24.50); Thom de Boer (20.15)	Netherlands	7 November 2021	European Championships	Kazan, Russia	
4×50m medley relay	1:36.18	=	Maaike de Waard (26.02); Caspar Corbeau (24.78); Sean Niewold (22.27); Marrit Steenbergen (23.11)	Netherlands	3 December 2025	European Championships	Lublin, Poland	
4×100 m medley relay	3:35.30	h	Maaike de Waard (56.66); Caspar Corbeau (56.69); Nyls Korstanje (49.75); Milou van Wijk (52.20)	Netherlands	14 December 2024	World Championships	Budapest, Hungary	

Legend: # – Record awaiting ratification by KNZB; e – equalled existing record;
Records not set in finals: h – heat; so – swim-off
