= Alexei Sancov =

Moldovan swimmer

Personal information
- Born: 15 October 1999 (age 27) Chișinău, Moldova
- Height: 6 ft 2 in (188 cm)
- Weight: 187 lb (85 kg)

Sport
- Sport: Swimming
- Strokes: Freestyle
- College team: University of Southern California
Medal record
Representing Moldova
European Junior Championships
Gold medal – first place	2017 Netanya	200 m freestyle
Silver medal – second place	2016 Hódmezővásárhely	200 m freestyle
Silver medal – second place	2017 Netanya	100 m freestyle
European Youth Olympic Festival
Gold medal – first place	2015 Tbilisi	100 m freestyle
Gold medal – first place	2015 Tbilisi	200 m freestyle
Gold medal – first place	2015 Tbilisi	400 m freestyle
Silver medal – second place	2015 Tbilisi	1500 m freestyle

Alexei Sancov (born 15 October 1999) is a Moldovan competitive swimmer. He competed in the men's 200 metre freestyle event at the 2016 Summer Olympics and placed 34th with a time of 1:48.85. He competed at the 2020 Summer Olympics.

== Career ==
On 2 July 2017, Sancov broke the World Junior record in the 200 meter free at 18 years old and won the gold medal at the European Junior Championships with a time of 1:47.00. That time broke the official World Junior Record at the time in this event, which currently stood at 1:47.10, held by American Maxime Rooney. Rooney swam that time at the 2015 US National Championships in San Antonio, Texas. Earlier in the European Junior Championships he took silver in the 100 meter free with a time of :49.01.

He studied at University of Southern California.
