= Tatiana Chișca =

Moldovan swimmer (born 1995)

Tatiana Chişca
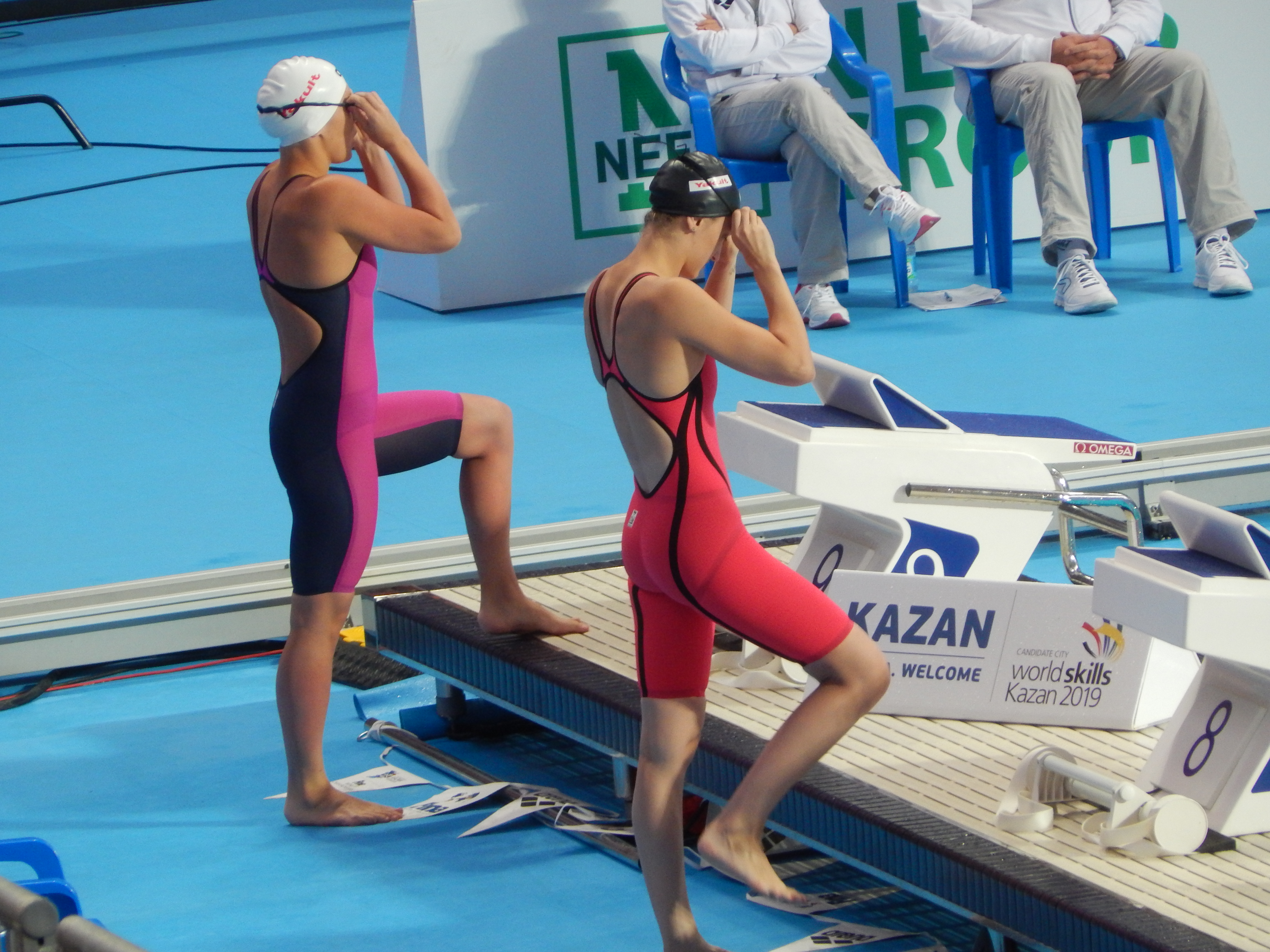
- Right on photo

Personal information
- Nationality: Moldova
- Born: 19 July 1995 (age 31) Bălți, Moldova
- Height: 1.75 m (5 ft 9 in)
- Weight: 57 kg (126 lb)

Sport
- Sport: Swimming
- Strokes: Breaststroke

Tatiana Chişca (born July 19, 1995, in Bălți) is a Moldovan swimmer, who specialized in breaststroke events. Chisca qualified for the women's 100 m breaststroke at the 2012 Summer Olympics in London by breaking a Moldovan record and eclipsing a FINA B-standard entry time of 1:10.68 from the Ukrainian Championships in Dnipropetrovsk. She challenged seven other swimmers on the second heat, including two-time Olympian Danielle Beaubrun of St. Lucia. Chisca rounded out the field to last place by more than two seconds behind Chinese Taipei's Chen I-Chuan in 1:13.30. Chisca failed to advance into the semifinals, as she placed fortieth overall in the preliminaries.
