= Portugal at the 2023 World Aquatics Championships =

- Flag of Portugal
- World Aquatics code: POR
- National federation: Portuguese Swimming Federation
- Website: fpnatacao.pt (in Portuguese)

in Fukuoka, Japan
- Competitors: 14 in 3 sports
- Medals Ranked 21st: Gold 0 Silver 1 Bronze 0 Total 1

World Aquatics Championships appearances
- 1973; 1975; 1978; 1982; 1986; 1991; 1994; 1998; 2001; 2003; 2005; 2007; 2009; 2011; 2013; 2015; 2017; 2019; 2022; 2023; 2024; 2025

Portugal competed at the 2023 World Aquatics Championships in Fukuoka, Japan from 14 to 30 July.

== Medalists ==
Medal	Name	Sport	Event	Date
Silver	Diogo Ribeiro	Swimming	Men's 50 m butterfly	July 24

== Artistic swimming ==
Portugal entered 2 artistic swimmers.

Women

Athlete	Event	Preliminaries		Final	
Athlete	Event	Points	Rank	Points	Rank
Maria Gonçalves; Cheila Vieira	Duet technical routine	217.5866	11 Q	208.4600	11
Maria Gonçalves; Cheila Vieira	Duet free routine	167.1750	15	did not advance	

== Open water swimming ==
Portugal entered 4 open water swimmers.

Men

Athlete	Event	Time	Rank
Tiago Campos	Men's 5 km	DNF	
Tiago Campos	Men's 10 km	1:54:05.5	20
Diogo Cardoso	Men's 5 km	57:49.7	35
Diogo Cardoso	Men's 10 km	1:54:08.7	23

Women

Athlete	Event	Time	Rank
Angélica André	Women's 5 km	59:35.6	4
Angélica André	Women's 10 km	2:03:18.9	15
Mafalda Rosa	Women's 5 km	59:44.6	9
Mafalda Rosa	Women's 10 km	2:03:25.9	17

== Swimming ==
Portugal entered 8 swimmers.

Men

Athlete	Event	Heat		Semifinal		Final	
Athlete	Event	Time	Rank	Time	Rank	Time	Rank
João Costa	50 metre backstroke	25.28 NR	22	Did not advance			
João Costa	100 metre backstroke	53.71 NR	10 Q	54.30	16	Did not advance	
João Costa	200 metre backstroke	1:59.30	19	Did not advance			
Gabriel Lopes	100 metre breaststroke	1:01.69	32	Did not advance			
Gabriel Lopes	200 metre individual medley	1:58.77	14 Q	2:00.28	16	Did not advance	
Diogo Ribeiro	50 metre freestyle	22.05	16 Q	22.03	13	Did not advance	
Diogo Ribeiro	100 metre freestyle	48.21	14 Q	48.13	10	Did not advance	
Diogo Ribeiro	50 metre butterfly	23.14	6 Q	23.04	7 Q	22.80	2nd place, silver medalist(s)
Diogo Ribeiro	100 metre butterfly	51.57	12 Q	51.54	13	Did not advance	
Miguel Nascimento	50 metre freestyle	22.38	34	Did not advance			
Miguel Nascimento	50 metre butterfly	23.95	42	Did not advance			
João Costa; Gabriel Lopes; Diogo Ribeiro; Miguel Nascimento	4 × 100 m medley relay	3:35.63 NR	16	—N/a		Did not advance	

Women

Athlete	Event	Heat		Semifinal		Final	
Athlete	Event	Time	Rank	Time	Rank	Time	Rank
Diana Durães	1500 metre freestyle	17:05.18	28	—N/a		Did not advance	
Tamila Holub	800 metre freestyle	8:42.90	25	—N/a		Did not advance	
Tamila Holub	1500 metre freestyle	16:30.39	20	—N/a		Did not advance	
Ana Rodrigues	50 metre freestyle	Did not start					
Ana Rodrigues	50 metre breaststroke	Did not start					
Ana Rodrigues	100 metre breaststroke	1:09.97	37	Did not advance			
Camila Rebelo	50 metre backstroke	28.65	28	Did not advance			
Camila Rebelo	100 metre backstroke	1:01.27	24	Did not advance			
Camila Rebelo	200 metre backstroke	2:11.80	15 Q	2:12.47	15	Did not advance	
