= Portugal at the 2025 World Aquatics Championships =

- Flag of Portugal
- World Aquatics code: POR
- National federation: Portuguese Swimming Federation
- Website: fpnatacao.pt (in Portuguese)

in Singapore
- Competitors: 7 in 2 sports
- Medals: Gold 0 Silver 0 Bronze 0 Total 0

World Aquatics Championships appearances
- 1973; 1975; 1978; 1982; 1986; 1991; 1994; 1998; 2001; 2003; 2005; 2007; 2009; 2011; 2013; 2015; 2017; 2019; 2022; 2023; 2024; 2025

Portugal competed at the 2025 World Aquatics Championships in Singapore from July 11 to August 3, 2025.

== Competitors ==
The following is the list of competitors in the Championships.

Sport	Men	Women	Total
Open water swimming	2	1	3
Swimming	1	3	4
Total	3	4	7

== Open water swimming ==
Men

Athlete	Event	Heat		Semi-final		Final	
Athlete	Event	Time	Rank	Time	Rank	Time	Rank
Tiago Campos	Men's 5 km	—				1:03:27.9	52
Tiago Campos	Men's 10 km	—				2:11:38.5	42
Diogo Cardoso	Men's 5 km	—				1:01:06.7	30
Diogo Cardoso	Men's 10 km	—				2:03:17.9	17

Women

Athlete	Event	Heat		Semi-final		Final	
Athlete	Event	Time	Rank	Time	Rank	Time	Rank
Mafalda Rosa	Women's 5 km	—				1:05:00.6	23
Mafalda Rosa	Women's 10 km	—				2:09:22.7	7

== Swimming ==
Portugal entered 4 swimmers.

Men

Athlete	Event	Heat		Semi-final		Final	
Athlete	Event	Time	Rank	Time	Rank	Time	Rank
Diogo Ribeiro	50 m freestyle	22.08	26	Did not advance			
Diogo Ribeiro	100 m freestyle	Did not start		Did not advance			
Diogo Ribeiro	50 m butterfly	22.90	4 Q	22.83	5 Q	22.77 NR	4
Diogo Ribeiro	100 m butterfly	51.34	9 Q	51.21	12	Did not advance	

Women

Athlete	Event	Heat		Semi-final		Final	
Athlete	Event	Time	Rank	Time	Rank	Time	Rank
Diana Durães	800 m freestyle	8:49.84	24	—		Did not advance	
Diana Durães	1500 m freestyle	16:56.80	25	—		Did not advance	
Camila Rebelo	100 m backstroke	1:01.38	23	Did not advance			
Camila Rebelo	200 m backstroke	2:09.79	9 Q	2:09.40	9	Did not advance	
Francisca Soares Martins	200 m freestyle	1:58.67	20	Did not advance			
Francisca Soares Martins	400 m freestyle	4:10.16	15	—		Did not advance	
