= Portugal at the 2017 World Aquatics Championships =

- Flag of Portugal
- World Aquatics code: POR
- National federation: Federação Portuguesa de Natação
- Website: www.fpnatacao.pt

in Budapest, Hungary
- Competitors: 12 in 3 sports
- Medals: Gold 0 Silver 0 Bronze 0 Total 0

World Aquatics Championships appearances
- 1973; 1975; 1978; 1982; 1986; 1991; 1994; 1998; 2001; 2003; 2005; 2007; 2009; 2011; 2013; 2015; 2017; 2019; 2022; 2023; 2024; 2025

Portugal competed at the 2017 World Aquatics Championships in Budapest, Hungary from 14 July to 30 July.

== Open water swimming ==
Portugal has entered two open water swimmers

Athlete	Event	Time	Rank
Angelica María	Women's 5 km	1:01:13.3	19
Angelica María	Women's 10 km	2:07:20.4	35
Vânia Neves	Women's 5 km	1:01:27.7	25
Vânia Neves	Women's 10 km	2:09:39.0	41

== Swimming ==
Portuguese swimmers have achieved qualifying standards in the following events (up to a maximum of 2 swimmers in each event at the A-standard entry time, and 1 at the B-standard):

Men

Athlete	Event	Heat		Semifinal		Final	
Athlete	Event	Time	Rank	Time	Rank	Time	Rank
Gabriel Lopes	50 m backstroke	26.05	38	did not advance			
Gabriel Lopes	100 m backstroke	55.99	30	did not advance			
Gabriel Lopes	200 m backstroke	2:02.78	33	did not advance			
Miguel Nascimento	50 m freestyle	22.69	36	did not advance			
Miguel Nascimento	100 m freestyle	49.56	33	did not advance			
Miguel Nascimento	200 m butterfly	1:59.02	23	did not advance			
Guilherme Pina	800 m freestyle	8:08.96	25	—N/a		did not advance	
Guilherme Pina	1500 m freestyle	15:26.10	28	—N/a		did not advance	
Alexis Santos	200 m individual medley	1:59.69	14 Q	1:59.22 NR	12	did not advance	
Alexis Santos	400 m individual medley	4:17.34	11	—N/a		did not advance	

Women

Athlete	Event	Heat		Semifinal		Final	
Athlete	Event	Time	Rank	Time	Rank	Time	Rank
Diana Durães	200 m freestyle	2:01.48	26	did not advance			
Diana Durães	400 m freestyle	4:10.07	13	—N/a		did not advance	
Diana Durães	800 m freestyle	8:35.10	13	—N/a		did not advance	
Tamila Holub	800 m freestyle	8:44.85	21	—N/a		did not advance	
Tamila Holub	1500 m freestyle	16:24.05	10	—N/a		did not advance	
Victoria Kaminskaya	200 m breaststroke	2:29.18	20	did not advance			
Victoria Kaminskaya	200 m individual medley	2:14.33	24	did not advance			
Victoria Kaminskaya	400 m individual medley	4:44.96	17	—N/a		did not advance	

== Synchronized swimming ==
Portugal's synchronized swimming team consisted of 3 athletes (3 female).

Women

Athlete	Event	Preliminaries		Final	
Athlete	Event	Points	Rank	Points	Rank
Maria Gonçalves; Cheila Vieira; Barbara Costa (R)	Duet technical routine	71.7694	33	did not advance	
Maria Gonçalves; Cheila Vieira; Barbara Costa (R)	Duet free routine	70.8667	37	did not advance	

Legend: (R) = Reserve Athlete
