= Portugal at the 2024 World Aquatics Championships =

- Flag of Portugal
- FINA code: POR
- National federation: Portuguese Swimming Federation
- Website: fpnatacao.pt (in Portuguese)

in Doha, Qatar
- Competitors: 15 in 3 sports
- Medals Ranked 11th: Gold 2 Silver 0 Bronze 1 Total 3

World Aquatics Championships appearances
- 1973; 1975; 1978; 1982; 1986; 1991; 1994; 1998; 2001; 2003; 2005; 2007; 2009; 2011; 2013; 2015; 2017; 2019; 2022; 2023; 2024

Portugal competed at the 2024 World Aquatics Championships in Doha, Qatar from 2 to 18 February.

== Medalists ==
Medal	Name	Sport	Event	Date
1st place, gold medalist(s)	Diogo Ribeiro	Swimming	Men's 50 metre butterfly	12 February 2024
1st place, gold medalist(s)	Diogo Ribeiro	Swimming	Men's 100 metre butterfly	17 February 2024
3rd place, bronze medalist(s)	Angélica André	Open water swimming	Women's 10 km	3 February 2024

== Competitors ==
The following is the list of competitors in the Championships.

Sport	Men	Women	Total
Artistic swimming	0	2	2
Open water swimming	2	2	4
Swimming	4	5	9
Total	6	9	15

== Artistic swimming ==
Women

Athlete	Event	Preliminaries		Final	
Athlete	Event	Points	Rank	Points	Rank
Maria Gonçalves; Cheila Vieira	Duet technical routine	231.5767	10 Q	236.8117	8
Maria Gonçalves; Cheila Vieira	Duet free routine	172.4542	19	Did not advance	

== Open water swimming ==
Men

Athlete	Event	Time	Rank
Tiago Campos	Men's 5 km	53:19.4	17
Tiago Campos	Men's 10 km	1:49:54.5	23
Diogo Cardoso	Men's 5 km	54:13.3	32
Diogo Cardoso	Men's 10 km	1:49:58.2	26

Women

Athlete	Event	Time	Rank
Angélica André	Women's 5 km	57:54.1	10
Angélica André	Women's 10 km	1:57:28.2	3rd place, bronze medalist(s)
Mafalda Rosa	Women's 5 km	57:55.4	13
Mafalda Rosa	Women's 10 km	1:57:52.9	19

Mixed

Athlete	Event	Time	Rank
Angélica André; Tiago Campos; Diogo Cardoso; Mafalda Rosa	Team relay	1:05:05.7	7

== Swimming ==
Portugal entered 9 swimmers.

Men

Athlete	Event	Heat		Semifinal		Final	
Athlete	Event	Time	Rank	Time	Rank	Time	Rank
Gabriel Lopes	100 metre backstroke	55.08	24	Did not advance			
Gabriel Lopes	200 metre individual medley	1:59.80	6 Q	2:00.27	12	Did not advance	
Diogo Ribeiro	50 metre freestyle	22.14	18	Did not advance			
Diogo Ribeiro	100 metre freestyle	48.72	12 Q	48.44	11	Did not advance	
Diogo Ribeiro	50 metre butterfly	23.18	5 Q	23.18	4 Q	22.97	1st place, gold medalist(s)
Diogo Ribeiro	100 metre butterfly	51.78	5 Q	51.30 NR	1 Q	51.17 NR	1st place, gold medalist(s)
Miguel Nascimento	50 metre freestyle	22.25	26	Did not advance			
Francisco Robalo	100 metre breaststroke	1:01.83	29	Did not advance			
Gabriel Lopes; Francisco Robalo; Diogo Ribeiro; Miguel Nascimento	4 × 100 m medley relay	3:35.63 NR	10	—		Did not advance	

Women

Athlete	Event	Heat		Semifinal		Final	
Athlete	Event	Time	Rank	Time	Rank	Time	Rank
Tamila Holub	800 metre freestyle	8:45.94	19	—		Did not advance	
Tamila Holub	1500 metre freestyle	16:31.64	15	—		Did not advance	
Mariana Pacheco	100 metre butterfly	59.93	21	Did not advance			
Mariana Pacheco	200 metre butterfly	2:12.59	16 Q	2:12.52	13	Did not advance	
Ana Rodrigues	50 metre breaststroke	31.25	16 Q	31.09	14	Did not advance	
Ana Rodrigues	100 metre breaststroke	1:09.82	27	Did not advance			
Camila Rebelo	50 metre backstroke	29.19	27	Did not advance			
Camila Rebelo	100 metre backstroke	1:01.51	13 Q	1:00.91	10	Did not advance	
Camila Rebelo	200 metre backstroke	2:13.33	18	Did not advance			
Francisca Soares	200 metre freestyle	2:00.10	20	Did not advance			
Francisca Soares	400 metre freestyle	4:15.04	20	—		Did not advance	
Camila Rebelo; Ana Rodrigues; Mariana Pacheco; Francisca Soares	4 × 100 m medley relay	4:05.26	14	—		Did not advance	
