= Portugal at the 2019 World Aquatics Championships =

- Flag of Portugal
- World Aquatics code: POR
- National federation: Portuguese Swimming Federation
- Website: fpnatacao.pt (in Portuguese)

in Gwangju, South Korea
- Medals: Gold 0 Silver 0 Bronze 0 Total 0

World Aquatics Championships appearances
- 1973; 1975; 1978; 1982; 1986; 1991; 1994; 1998; 2001; 2003; 2005; 2007; 2009; 2011; 2013; 2015; 2017; 2019; 2022; 2023; 2024; 2025

Portugal competed at the 2019 World Aquatics Championships in Gwangju, South Korea from 12 to 28 July.

== Artistic swimming ==
Portugal entered two artistic swimmers.

Women

| Athlete | Event | Preliminaries | | Final | |
| Athlete | Event | Points | Rank | Points | Rank |
|---|---|---|---|---|---|
| Maria Gonçalves; Cheila Vieira | Duet technical routine | 76.2328 | 25 | Did not advance | |
| Maria Gonçalves; Cheila Vieira | Duet free routine | 75.6333 | 31 | Did not advance | |

== Open water swimming ==
Portugal qualified two male and one female open water swimmers.

Men

| Athlete | Event | Time | Rank |
|---|---|---|---|
| Tiago Campos | Men's 5 km | 53:57.2 | 38 |
| Tiago Campos | Men's 10 km | 1:52:39.3 | 49 |
| Rafael Gil | Men's 5 km | 53:45.7 | 28 |
| Rafael Gil | Men's 10 km | 1:50:27.3 | 42 |

Women

| Athlete | Event | Time | Rank |
|---|---|---|---|
| Angélica André | Women's 5 km | 58:11.8 | 12 |
| Angélica André | Women's 10 km | 1:55:23.4 | 19 |
| Angélica André | Women's 25 km | DNF | |

== Swimming ==
Portugal entered 10 swimmers.

Men

| Athlete | Event | Heat | | Semifinal | | Final | |
| Athlete | Event | Time | Rank | Time | Rank | Time | Rank |
|---|---|---|---|---|---|---|---|
| Gabriel Lópes | 100 m backstroke | 55.33 | 31 | Did not advance | | | |
| Gabriel Lópes | 200 m backstroke | 2:03.33 | 34 | Did not advance | | | |
| Gabriel Lópes | 200 m individual medley | 1:59.76 | 16 Q | 1:59.56 | 15 | Did not advance | |
| Miguel Nascimento | 50 m freestyle | DNS | | Did not advance | | | |
| Miguel Nascimento | 100 m freestyle | 49.98 | 44 | Did not advance | | | |
| Miguel Nascimento | 200 m freestyle | 1:49.71 | 37 | Did not advance | | | |
| Alexis Santos | 50 m backstroke | 25.68 | 30 | Did not advance | | | |
| Alexis Santos | 200 m individual medley | 1:59.01 | 10 Q | 1:58.62 | 12 | Did not advance | |
| João Vital | 400 m individual medley | 4:17.18 | 14 | —N/a | | Did not advance | |
| Miguel Nascimento; Alexis Santos; Tomás Veloso; Diogo Carvalho | 4×200 m freestyle relay | 7:17.92 | 20 | —N/a | | Did not advance | |

Women

| Athlete | Event | Heat | | Semifinal | | Final | |
| Athlete | Event | Time | Rank | Time | Rank | Time | Rank |
|---|---|---|---|---|---|---|---|
| Diana Durães | 400 m freestyle | 4:17.87 | 27 | —N/a | | Did not advance | |
| Diana Durães | 800 m freestyle | 8:44.37 | 20 | —N/a | | Did not advance | |
| Diana Durães | 1500 m freestyle | 16:30.67 | 18 | —N/a | | Did not advance | |
| Tamila Holub | 800 m freestyle | 8:38.77 | 17 | —N/a | | Did not advance | |
| Tamila Holub | 1500 m freestyle | 16:29.57 | 16 | —N/a | | Did not advance | |
| Victoria Kaminskaya | 200 m breaststroke | 2:26.06 | 14 Q | 2:25.67 | 12 | Did not advance | |
| Victoria Kaminskaya | 200 m individual medley | 2:13.97 | 19 | Did not advance | | | |
| Victoria Kaminskaya | 400 m individual medley | 4:43.03 | 15 | —N/a | | Did not advance | |
| Ana Monteiro | 100 m butterfly | 1:00.37 | 29 | Did not advance | | | |
| Ana Monteiro | 200 m butterfly | 2:09.43 | 9 Q | 2:09.72 | 12 | Did not advance | |
| Diana Durães; Tamila Holub; Ana Monteiro; Victoria Kaminskaya | 4×200 m freestyle relay | 8:29.99 | 14 | —N/a | | Did not advance | |
