= Portugal at the 2022 World Aquatics Championships =

- Flag of Portugal
- World Aquatics code: POR
- National federation: Portuguese Swimming Federation

in Budapest, Hungary
- Competitors: 14 in 3 sports
- Medals: Gold 0 Silver 0 Bronze 0 Total 0

World Aquatics Championships appearances
- 1973; 1975; 1978; 1982; 1986; 1991; 1994; 1998; 2001; 2003; 2005; 2007; 2009; 2011; 2013; 2015; 2017; 2019; 2022; 2023; 2024; 2025

Portugal competed at the 2022 World Aquatics Championships in Budapest, Hungary from 18 June to 3 July.

== Artistic swimming ==
Portugal entered 10 artistic swimmers.

Women

Athlete	Event	Preliminaries		Final	
Athlete	Event	Points	Rank	Points	Rank
Maria Gonçalves; Cheila Vieira	Duet free routine	79.3333	16	did not advance	
Beatriz Cruz Gama; Filipa Faria; Carlota Fonseca; Maria Gonçalves; Marta Moreira; Barbara Neto Costa; Francisca Rosa; Cheila Vieira	Team technical routine	75.6638	13	did not advance	

== Open water swimming ==
Portugal entered 4 open water swimmers (2 male and 2 female)

Men

Athlete	Event	Time	Rank
Tiago Campos	10 km	1:55:33.5	20
Diogo Cardoso	10 km	1:56:18.4	27

Women

Athlete	Event	Time	Rank
Angélica André	10 km	2:02:39.3	7
Mafalda Rosa	10 km	2:02:48.3	12

Mixed

Athlete	Event	Time	Rank
Angélica André; Mafalda Rosa; Tiago Campos; Diogo Cardoso	Team	1:07:08.0	10

== Swimming ==
Portugal entered 2 swimmers.

Men

Athlete	Event	Heat		Semifinal		Final	
Athlete	Event	Time	Rank	Time	Rank	Time	Rank
José Paulo Lopes	400 m freestyle	3:56.59	30	—N/a		did not advance	
José Paulo Lopes	800 m freestyle	8:14.40	22	—N/a		did not advance	

Women

Athlete	Event	Heat		Semifinal		Final	
Athlete	Event	Time	Rank	Time	Rank	Time	Rank
Diana Durães	800 m freestyle	8:41.37	15	—N/a		did not advance	
Diana Durães	1500 m freestyle	16:25.23	11	—N/a		did not advance	
