= Portugal at the 2013 World Aquatics Championships =

- Flag of Portugal
- World Aquatics code: POR
- National federation: Federação Portuguesa de Natação
- Website: www.fpnatacao.pt

in Barcelona, Spain
- Competitors: 9 in 2 sports
- Medals: Gold 0 Silver 0 Bronze 0 Total 0

World Aquatics Championships appearances
- 1973; 1975; 1978; 1982; 1986; 1991; 1994; 1998; 2001; 2003; 2005; 2007; 2009; 2011; 2013; 2015; 2017; 2019; 2022; 2023; 2024; 2025

Portugal is competing at the 2013 World Aquatics Championships in Barcelona, Spain between 19 July and 4 August 2013.

== Open water swimming ==
Portugal qualified three quota places for the following events in open water swimming.

Athlete	Event	Time	Rank
Vasco Gaspar	Men's 5 km	53:40.5	14
Vasco Gaspar	Men's 10 km	1:50:20.7	33
Arseniy Lavrentyev	Men's 10 km	1:50:31.7	39
Arseniy Lavrentyev	Men's 25 km	5:03:12.8	27
Angelica André	Women's 5 km	57:22.1	21
Angelica André	Women's 10 km	2:04:45.4	=41

== Swimming ==
Portuguese swimmers achieved qualifying standards in the following events (up to a maximum of 2 swimmers in each event at the A-standard entry time, and 1 at the B-standard):

Men

Athlete	Event	Heat		Semifinal		Final	
Athlete	Event	Time	Rank	Time	Rank	Time	Rank
Carlos Almeida	50 m breaststroke	28.16 NR	=37	did not advance			
Carlos Almeida	100 m breaststroke	1:01.01 NR	24	did not advance			
Carlos Almeida	200 m breaststroke	2:13.21 NR	22	did not advance			
Diogo Carvalho	200 m individual medley	1:59.39	13 Q	2:00.09	15	did not advance	
Simão Morgado	50 m butterfly	24.20	31	did not advance			
Simão Morgado	100 m butterfly	53.83	31	did not advance			
Pedro Oliveira	200 m backstroke	1:59.95	19	did not advance			
Pedro Oliveira	200 m butterfly	1:58.78	23	did not advance			
Alexis Santos	50 m backstroke	25.78	20	did not advance			
Alexis Santos	400 m individual medley	4:16.30	12	—		did not advance	

Women

Athlete	Event	Heat		Semifinal		Final	
Athlete	Event	Time	Rank	Time	Rank	Time	Rank
Victoria Kaminskaya	200 m individual medley	2:17.21 NR	30	did not advance			
Victoria Kaminskaya	400 m individual medley	4:52.12	25	—		did not advance	

== See also ==
- Portugal at the 2013 World Championships in Athletics
