= Portugal at the 2015 World Aquatics Championships =

- Flag of Portugal
- World Aquatics code: POR
- National federation: Federação Portuguesa de Natação
- Website: www.fpnatacao.pt

in Kazan, Russia
- Competitors: 8 in 2 sports
- Medals: Gold 0 Silver 0 Bronze 0 Total 0

World Aquatics Championships appearances
- 1973; 1975; 1978; 1982; 1986; 1991; 1994; 1998; 2001; 2003; 2005; 2007; 2009; 2011; 2013; 2015; 2017; 2019; 2022; 2023; 2024; 2025

Portugal competed at the 2015 World Aquatics Championships in Kazan, Russia from 24 July to 9 August 2015.

== Open water swimming ==
Portugal fielded a full team of three swimmers to compete in the open water marathon.

Athlete	Event	Time	Rank
Vasco Gaspar	Men's 5 km	55:36.4	28
Vasco Gaspar	Men's 10 km	1:56:38.9	55
Rafael Gil	Men's 10 km	1:53:01.2	41
Angélica André	Women's 10 km	2:01:40.4	38
Angélica André; Vasco Gaspar; Rafael Gil	Mixed team	58:12.6	15

== Swimming ==
Portuguese swimmers have achieved qualifying standards in the following events (up to a maximum of 2 swimmers in each event at the A-standard entry time, and 1 at the B-standard):

Men

Athlete	Event	Heat		Semifinal		Final	
Athlete	Event	Time	Rank	Time	Rank	Time	Rank
Diogo Carvalho	200 m breaststroke	2:15.58	36	did not advance			
Diogo Carvalho	200 m individual medley	1:59.61	11 Q	2:00.31	15	did not advance	
Diogo Carvalho	400 m individual medley	4:18.67	18	—N/a		did not advance	
Nuno Quintanilha	100 m butterfly	54.27	43	did not advance			
Nuno Quintanilha	200 m butterfly	2:01.46	30	did not advance			
Alexis Santos	50 m backstroke	25.70	28	did not advance			
Alexis Santos	400 m individual medley	4:22.35	26	—N/a		did not advance	

Women

Athlete	Event	Heat		Semifinal		Final	
Athlete	Event	Time	Rank	Time	Rank	Time	Rank
Victoria Kaminskaya	200 m breaststroke	2:33.73	35	did not advance			
Victoria Kaminskaya	200 m individual medley	2:16.89	28	did not advance			
Victoria Kaminskaya	400 m individual medley	4:53.47	31	—N/a		did not advance	
Ana Catarina Monteiro	100 m butterfly	1:01.53	40	did not advance			
Ana Catarina Monteiro	200 m butterfly	2:12.87	24	did not advance			
