= Open water swimming at the 2019 World Aquatics Championships – Men's 10 km =

Men's 10 km at the 2019 World Aquatics Championships
- Venue: Yeosu Expo Ocean Park
- Location: Gwangju, South Korea
- Dates: 16 July
- Competitors: 74 from 47 nations
- Winning time: 1:47:55.9

Medalists
gold medal	Florian Wellbrock	Germany
silver medal	Marc-Antoine Olivier	France
bronze medal	Rob Muffels	Germany

The men's 10 km competition in open water swimming at the 2019 World Aquatics Championships was held on 16 July 2019. Florian Wellbrock won gold, after also winning gold in the 1500 m freestyle. This was the first time that the 1500 m gold and 10 km gold had been achieved by the same person in any international meet.

== Race ==
The race was started at 08:00.

Results
Rank	Swimmer	Nation	Time
1st place, gold medalist(s)	Florian Wellbrock	Germany	1:47:55.9
2nd place, silver medalist(s)	Marc-Antoine Olivier	France	1:47:56.1
3rd place, bronze medalist(s)	Rob Muffels	Germany	1:47:57.4
4	Kristóf Rasovszky	Hungary	1:47:59.5
5	Jordan Wilimovsky	United States	1:48:01.0
5	Gregorio Paltrinieri	Italy	1:48:01.0
7	Ferry Weertman	Netherlands	1:48:01.9
8	Alberto Martínez	Spain	1:48:02.2
9	Mario Sanzullo	Italy	1:48:04.7
10	David Aubry	France	1:48:05.1
11	Esteban Enderica	Ecuador	1:48:07.3
12	Jack Burnell	Great Britain	1:48:09.9
13	Athanasios Kynigakis	Greece	1:48:15.4
14	Kai Edwards	Australia	1:48:16.2
15	Logan Vanhuys	Belgium	1:48:17.5
16	Matěj Kozubek	Czech Republic	1:48:19.1
17	Hau-Li Fan	Canada	1:48:21.1
18	Tobias Robinson	Great Britain	1:48:23.5
19	Kirill Abrosimov	Russia	1:48:55.9
20	Matan Roditi	Israel	1:48:59.6
21	Nicholas Sloman	Australia	1:49:22.7
22	Evgeny Drattsev	Russia	1:49:37.4
23	Chad Ho	South Africa	1:49:37.9
24	Jon McKay	Canada	1:49:43.7
25	David Heron	United States	1:49:57.6
26	Krzysztof Pielowski	Poland	1:50:02.8
27	Dániel Székelyi	Hungary	1:50:11.3
28	Guillem Pujol	Spain	1:50:11.6
29	An Jiabao	China	1:50:14.0
30	Danie Marais	South Africa	1:50:14.2
31	David Castro	Ecuador	1:50:14.4
32	Phillip Seidler	Namibia	1:50:14.4
33	Allan do Carmo	Brazil	1:50:14.7
34	Victor Johansson	Sweden	1:50:14.8
35	Victor Colonese	Brazil	1:50:15.2
36	Diego Vera	Venezuela	1:50:15.6
37	Elliot Sodemann	Sweden	1:50:16.0
38	Oussama Mellouli	Tunisia	1:50:21.0
39	Takeshi Toyoda	Japan	1:50:22.0
40	Santiago Arteta	Argentina	1:50:24.1
41	Vít Ingeduld	Czech Republic	1:50:24.9
42	Rafael Gil	Portugal	1:50:27.3
43	Yuval Safra	Israel	1:50:34.2
44	David Brandl	Austria	1:51:26.3
45	Taiki Nonaka	Japan	1:51:35.3
46	Joaquín Moreno	Argentina	1:51:45.7
47	Aflah Prawira	Indonesia	1:52:33.8
48	Tamaš Farkaš	Serbia	1:52:36.7
49	Tiago Campos	Portugal	1:52:39.3
50	Arturo Pérez	Mexico	1:52:42.6
51	Evgenij Pop Acev	North Macedonia	1:52:43.0
52	Ihor Chervynskyy	Ukraine	1:52:45.2
53	Park Seok-hyun	South Korea	1:52:47.6
54	Zhao Junbohang	China	1:52:52.7
55	Wilder Carreno	Venezuela	1:52:53.5
56	Marwan El-Amrawy	Egypt	1:54:40.8
57	Fernando Betanzos	Mexico	1:56:07.9
58	Mathieu Ben Rahou	Morocco	1:56:07.9
59	Jae Park	South Korea	1:56:41.4
60	Lev Cherepanov	Kazakhstan	1:58:04.4
61	William Thorley	Hong Kong	1:59:36.8
62	Rodrigo Caballero	Bolivia	1:59:41.5
63	Keith Sin	Hong Kong	2:00:21.9
64	Tomáš Peciar	Slovakia	2:00:24.2
65	Maximiliano Paccot	Uruguay	2:00:24.5
66	Damien Payet	Seychelles	2:00:27.6
67	Tanakrit Kittiya	Thailand	2:00:37.1
68	Sushrut Kapse	India	2:03:25.9
69	Santiago Reyes	Guatemala	2:08:27.5
70	Zedheir Torrez	Bolivia	2:08:27.7
71	Siwat Matangkapong	Thailand	2:09:32.8
72	Rinel Pius	Estonia	2:09:56.0
73	Cristofer Lanuza	Costa Rica	2:10:16.8
	Alain Vidot	Seychelles	OTL
	Saurabh Sangvekar	India	DNS
