= Marathon swimming at the 2020 Summer Olympics – Men's 10 kilometre =

Men's marathon swimming at the Games of the XXXII Olympiad
- Venue: Odaiba Marine Park
- Dates: 5 August 2021
- Competitors: 26 from 23 nations
- Winning time: 1:48:33.7

Medalists
1st place, gold medalist(s)		Florian Wellbrock	Germany
2nd place, silver medalist(s)		Kristóf Rasovszky	Hungary
3rd place, bronze medalist(s)		Gregorio Paltrinieri	Italy

The men's marathon swimming 10 kilometre event at the 2020 Summer Olympics was held on 5 August 2021 at the Odaiba Marine Park. It was the fourth appearance of the event, having first been held in 2008.

Florian Wellbrock won the gold medal for Germany, with a final time of 1:48:33.7. This was 25.3 seconds ahead of silver medalist Kristóf Rasovszky of Hungary; Gregorio Paltrinieri of Italy took the bronze. 2016 gold medalist Ferry Weertman of the Netherlands came seventh.

It was all three of the medalists debut open water swim in the Olympics, though all three had previously met the 1500 m pool event at the 2016 Rio Olympics.

== Race ==
Wellbrock broke away from the rest of the field from the start, and led at every checkpoint. This was the first time anybody had won the men's 10 kilometer event at the Olympics by breaking away at the start and holding the lead until the finish.

Wellbrock's victory margin of 25.3 seconds was the largest victory margin ever seen in the event's history at the Olympics, with the second largest margin of victory being held by Sharon van Rouwendaal who finished 17.4 seconds ahead of second place at the 2016 women's 10 kilometer race.

== Qualification ==
The men's 10 km open water marathon at the 2020 Olympics featured a field of 25 swimmers:

- 10: the top-10 finishers in the 10 km races at the 2019 World Aquatics Championships (maximum of 2 per NOC)
- 9: the top-9 finishers at the 2020 Olympic Marathon Swim Qualifier, open only to NOCs with no qualified swimmers (maximum of 1 per NOC)
- 5: one representative from each FINA continent (Africa, Americas, Asia, Europe and Oceania), based on the finishes at the 2020 Olympic Qualifier
- 1: from the host nation (Japan) if not qualified by other means. If Japan already has a qualifier in the race, this spot is allocated back into the general pool from the 2020 Olympic Qualifier.

== Competition format ==
Unlike all of the swimming events in the pool, the men's and women's marathon swimming 10 kilometre races are held in open water. No preliminary heats are held, with only the single mass-start race being contested. This race is held using freestyle swimming, with a lack of stroke regulations.

== Schedule ==
All times are Japan Standard Time (UTC+9)

Date	Time	Round
5 August 2021	6:30	Final

== Results ==
Rank	Swimmer	Nation	Time	Time behind	Notes
1st place, gold medalist(s)	Florian Wellbrock	Germany	1:48:33.7		
2nd place, silver medalist(s)	Kristóf Rasovszky	Hungary	1:48:59.0	+25.3	
3rd place, bronze medalist(s)	Gregorio Paltrinieri	Italy	1:49:01.1	+27.4	
4	Matan Roditi	Israel	1:49:24.9	+51.2	
5	Athanasios Kynigakis	Greece	1:49:29.2	+55.5	
6	Marc-Antoine Olivier	France	1:50:23.0	+1:49.3	
7	Ferry Weertman	Netherlands	1:51:30.8	+2:57.1	
8	Michael McGlynn	South Africa	1:51:32.7	+2:59.0	
9	Hau-Li Fan	Canada	1:51:37.0	+3:03.3	
10	Jordan Wilimovsky	United States	1:51:40.2	+3:06.5	
11	Rob Muffels	Germany	1:53:03.3	+4:29.6	
12	Kai Edwards	Australia	1:53:04.0	+4:30.3	
13	Taishin Minamide	Japan	1:53:07.5	+4:33.8	
14	Mario Sanzullo	Italy	1:53:08.6	+4:34.9	
15	David Farinango	Ecuador	1:53:09.8	+4:36.1	
16	Phillip Seidler	Namibia	1:53:14.1	+4:40.4	
17	Daniel Delgadillo	Mexico	1:53:14.4	+4:40.7	
18	Alberto Martínez	Spain	1:53:16.4	+4:42.7	
19	Kirill Abrosimov	ROC	1:54:29.3	+5:55.6	
20	Oussama Mellouli	Tunisia	1:56:33.3	+7:59.6	
21	Vitaliy Khudyakov	Kazakhstan	1:57:53.7	+9:20.0	
22	William Yan Thorley	Hong Kong	1:58:33.4	+9:59.7	
23	Tiago Campos	Portugal	1:59:42.0	+11:08.3	
24	Matěj Kozubek	Czech Republic	2:01:52.1	+13:18.4	
	Hector Pardoe	Great Britain	Did not finish		
	David Aubry	France	Did not finish		
