= Swimming at the 2022 European Aquatics Championships – Men's 50 metre butterfly =

Men's 50 metre butterfly at the 2022 European Aquatics Championships
- Venue: Foro Italico
- Dates: 11 August (heats and semifinals); 12 August (final)
- Competitors: 57 from 32 nations
- Winning time: 22.89

Medalists
gold medal	Thomas Ceccon	Italy
silver medal	Maxime Grousset	France
bronze medal	Diogo Ribeiro	Portugal

The Men's 50 metre butterfly competition of the 2022 European Aquatics Championships was held on 11 and 12 August 2022.

== Records ==
Prior to the competition, the existing world, European and championship records were as follows.

	Name	Nation	Time	Location	Date
World record European record	Andriy Govorov	Ukraine	22.27	Rome	1 July 2018
Championship record	Andriy Govorov	Ukraine	22.48	Glasgow	7 August 2018

== Results ==
=== Heats ===
The heats were started on 11 August at 09:00.

Rank	Heat	Lane	Name	Nationality	Time	Notes
1	4	5	Nyls Korstanje	Netherlands	22.90	Q, NR
2	6	5	Maxime Grousset	France	23.20	Q
3	4	3	Diogo Ribeiro	Portugal	23.24	Q, NR
4	4	6	Piero Codia	Italy	23.28	Q
5	6	4	Thomas Ceccon	Italy	23.38	Q
6	4	4	Andriy Govorov	Ukraine	23.41	Q
7	5	0	Josif Miladinov	Bulgaria	23.46	Q, NR
8	6	3	Simon Bucher	Austria	23.47	Q
9	5	4	Szebasztián Szabó	Hungary	23.49	Q
10	5	6	Nicholas Lia	Norway	23.52	Q
11	4	9	Mario Mollà	Spain	23.54	Q
12	5	5	Konrad Czerniak	Poland	23.55	Q
13	6	7	Karol Ostrowski	Poland	23.57	Q
14	5	7	Max McCusker	Ireland	23.61	Q
15	5	9	Alberto Lozano	Spain	23.62	Q
15	6	8	Thomas Piron	France	23.62	Q
17	6	9	Kristian Gkolomeev	Greece	23.65	
18	5	3	Thomas Verhoeven	Netherlands	23.72	
19	3	4	Stergios Bilas	Greece	23.79	
19	4	2	Lorenzo Gargani	Italy	23.79	
21	5	2	Daniel Zaitsev	Estonia	23.82	
22	6	2	Meiron Cheruti	Israel	23.89	
23	4	0	Julien Berol	France	23.93	
23	6	1	Vladyslav Bukhov	Ukraine	23.93	
25	5	8	Julien Henx	Luxembourg	23.95	
26	4	8	Oskar Hoff	Sweden	23.97	
26	2	5	Nikola Miljenić	Croatia	23.97	
26	4	7	Jacob Peters	Great Britain	23.97	
29	6	0	Matteo Rivolta	Italy	23.98	
30	6	6	Paweł Smoliński	Poland	24.06	
30	2	3	Konstantinos Stamou	Greece	24.06	
32	3	7	Christos Papadopoulos	Greece	24.12	
32	3	5	Kenzo Simons	Netherlands	24.12	
34	3	8	Heiko Gigler	Austria	24.13	
34	4	1	Jan Šefl	Czech Republic	24.13	
36	3	9	Julius Munk	Denmark	24.14	
37	3	3	Sean Niewold	Netherlands	24.18	
38	2	4	Brendan Hyland	Ireland	24.19	
39	3	2	Clément Secchi	France	24.22	
40	1	8	Oleksii Khnykin	Ukraine	24.32	
41	2	8	Tomàs Lomero	Andorra	24.35	
42	2	6	Bernat Lomero	Andorra	24.37	
43	2	2	Alex Ahtiainen	Estonia	24.41	
44	3	1	Ádám Halás	Slovakia	24.42	
45	3	0	Valentyn Nesterkin	Ukraine	24.51	
46	3	6	Tobias Dan Hansen	Denmark	24.54	
47	2	1	Đurđe Matić	Serbia	24.57	
48	1	5	Símon Elías Statkevicius	Iceland	24.63	
49	1	4	Artur Barseghyan	Armenia	24.64	
49	2	0	Malthe Lindeblad	Denmark	24.64	
51	2	7	Ari-Pekka Liukkonen	Finland	25.09	
52	1	1	Ramil Valizada	Azerbaijan	25.25	
53	2	9	Tomáš Franta	Czech Republic	25.26	
54	1	3	Rudi Spiteri	Malta	25.51	
55	1	2	Luka Kukhalashvili	Georgia	25.54	
56	1	6	Alessandro Rebosio	San Marino	25.81	
57	1	7	Drini Ujkashej	Albania	29.80	
	5	1	Jakub Majerski	Poland	Did not start	

=== Semifinals ===
The semifinals were started on 11 August at 18:00.

Rank	Heat	Lane	Name	Nationality	Time	Notes
1	2	4	Nyls Korstanje	Netherlands	22.88	Q, NR
2	1	4	Maxime Grousset	France	22.90	Q
3	2	3	Thomas Ceccon	Italy	23.14	Q
4	2	5	Diogo Ribeiro	Portugal	23.18	Q, NR
5	2	6	Josif Miladinov	Bulgaria	23.20	Q, NR
6	1	3	Andriy Govorov	Ukraine	23.34	Q
7	2	2	Szebasztián Szabó	Hungary	23.36	Q
8	1	6	Simon Bucher	Austria	23.39	Q
9	1	5	Piero Codia	Italy	23.48	
10	2	7	Mario Mollà	Spain	23.61	
11	2	1	Karol Ostrowski	Poland	23.64	
12	2	8	Alberto Lozano	Spain	23.66	
13	1	7	Konrad Czerniak	Poland	23.70	
14	1	8	Thomas Piron	France	23.71	
15	1	1	Max McCusker	Ireland	23.75	
16	1	2	Nicholas Lia	Norway	23.88	

=== Final ===
The final was held on 12 August at 18:07.

Rank	Lane	Name	Nationality	Time	Notes
1st place, gold medalist(s)	3	Thomas Ceccon	Italy	22.89	
2nd place, silver medalist(s)	5	Maxime Grousset	France	22.97	
3rd place, bronze medalist(s)	6	Diogo Ribeiro	Portugal	23.07	NR
4	4	Nyls Korstanje	Netherlands	23.10	
5	8	Simon Bucher	Austria	23.12	NR
6	7	Andriy Govorov	Ukraine	23.18	
7	2	Josif Miladinov	Bulgaria	23.41	
8	1	Szebasztián Szabó	Hungary	23.62	
