= Maxime Grousset =

French swimmer (born 1999)

- Grousset in 2024

Personal information
- Nationality: French
- Born: 24 April 1999 (age 27) Nouméa, New Caledonia
- Height: 1.90 m (6 ft 3 in)
- Weight: 92 kg (203 lb)

Sport
- Sport: Swimming
- Strokes: Freestyle, butterfly
- Club: Amiens Metropole Natation
Medal record
Men's swimming
Representing France
Event	1st	2nd	3rd
Olympic Games	0	0	1
World Championships (LC)	3	2	5
World Championships (SC)	1	2	0
European Championships (LC)	3	4	1
European Championships (SC)	3	4	4
Total	10	12	11
Olympic Games
Bronze medal – third place	2024 Paris	4×100 m medley
World Championships (LC)
Gold medal – first place	2023 Fukuoka	100 m butterfly
Gold medal – first place	2025 Singapore	50 m butterfly
Gold medal – first place	2025 Singapore	100 m butterfly
Silver medal – second place	2022 Budapest	100 m freestyle
Silver medal – second place	2025 Singapore	4×100 m medley
Bronze medal – third place	2019 Gwangju	4×100 m mixed freestyle
Bronze medal – third place	2022 Budapest	50 m freestyle
Bronze medal – third place	2023 Fukuoka	100 m freestyle
Bronze medal – third place	2023 Fukuoka	50 m butterfly
Bronze medal – third place	2025 Singapore	4x100 m mixed freestyle
World Championships (SC)
Gold medal – first place	2022 Melbourne	4×50 m mixed freestyle
Silver medal – second place	2022 Melbourne	100 m freestyle
Silver medal – second place	2024 Budapest	100 m butterfly
European Championships (LC)
Gold medal – first place	2018 Glasgow	4×100 m mixed freestyle
Gold medal – first place	2022 Rome	4×100 m mixed freestyle
Gold medal – first place	2026 Paris	4×100 m mixed medley
Silver medal – second place	2022 Rome	4×100 m medley
Silver medal – second place	2022 Rome	50 m butterfly
Silver medal – second place	2026 Paris	50 m butterfly
Silver medal – second place	2026 Paris	100 m butterfly
Bronze medal – third place	2026 Paris	4×100 m medley
European Championships (SC)
Gold medal – first place	2023 Otopeni	100 m freestyle
Gold medal – first place	2025 Lublin	100 m freestyle
Gold medal – first place	2025 Lublin	100 m butterfly
Silver medal – second place	2023 Otopeni	100 m butterfly
Silver medal – second place	2025 Lublin	100 m medley
Silver medal – second place	2025 Lublin	50 m freestyle
Silver medal – second place	2025 Lublin	4x50 m medley
Bronze medal – third place	2019 Glasgow	4×50 m mixed freestyle
Bronze medal – third place	2023 Otopeni	50 m butterfly
Bronze medal – third place	2023 Otopeni	4×50 m mixed freestyle
Bronze medal – third place	2025 Lublin	50 m butterfly
World Junior Championships
Silver medal – second place	2017 Indianapolis	50 m freestyle
European Junior Championships
Bronze medal – third place	2017 Netanya	50 m freestyle
Bronze medal – third place	2017 Netanya	50 m butterfly

Maxime Grousset (French pronunciation: [maksim ɡʁusɛ]; born 24 April 1999) is a French swimmer from New Caledonia. He is a world record holder in the short course 4×50 metre mixed freestyle relay and european record holder in the long course 100 butterfly with a time of 49.62, second best performer and third best performances of all time. In butterfly, he has won three gold medals at the World Aquatics Championships (long course), in 50 m in 2025, and in 100 m in 2023 and 2025.

== Early life ==
Grousset was born and raised in the French sui generis overseas collectivity of New Caledonia, and began swimming at age five. His younger sister is Emma Grousset, who was crowned Miss New Caledonia 2023 and competed at Miss France 2024.

== Career ==
=== 2017–2018 ===
At the 2017 European Junior Swimming Championships in June and July, Grousset won bronze medals in the 50 metre freestyle, with a 22.59, and the 50 metre butterfly, with a 23.88, and placed seventh in the 100 metre freestyle with a 49.85 and fourth in the 4×100 metre medley relay, where he contributed to a final time of 3:41.67. The following month, at the 2017 World Junior Swimming Championships, he won the silver medal in the 50 metre freestyle with a time of 22.25 seconds, placed seventh in the 100 metre freestyle with a 49.95 and sixth in the 4×100 metre medley relay with a 3:41.89. He competed in the 4×100 metre mixed freestyle relay event at the 2018 European Aquatics Championships, winning the gold medal.

=== 2019–2021 ===
At the 2019 World Aquatics Championships in Gwangju, South Korea, Grousset won a bronze medal in the 4×100 metre mixed freestyle relay, contributing a 48.61 for the second leg of the relay in the preliminaries before being substituted out and Medhy Metella substituted in for the final. Later in the year, he won a bronze medal in the 4×50 metre mixed freestyle relay at the 2019 European Short Course Championships, held in December in Glasgow, Scotland, leading off with a 21.35 to contribute to a finish in a French record time of 1:28.86. In 2021, at the 2020 Summer Olympics in Tokyo, Japan, he placed fourth in the 100 metre freestyle, with a time of 47.72 seconds, behind Caeleb Dressel of the United States, Kyle Chalmers of Australia, and Kliment Kolesnikov of Russia.

==== 2021 World Short Course Championships ====
The second day of the 2021 World Short Course Championships in December in Abu Dhabi, United Arab Emirates, Grousset placed sixth in the 4×50 metre mixed freestyle relay, swimming a 21.17 for the lead-off leg of the relay to contribute to a final time of 1:30.06. On the morning of day four, he placed seventeenth in the preliminaries of the 50 metre butterfly with a time of 22.94 seconds, not advancing to the evening semifinals. In the evening, he placed sixth in the final of the 50 metre freestyle, finishing in a time of 21.08 seconds. Two days later, he started the evening finals session off with a fifth-place finish in the 100 metre freestyle in a time of 46.20 seconds. He concluded the day, and the Championships, with a relay team disqualification in the final of the 4×100 metre medley relay, with the disqualification due to a negative reaction time for the start by the breaststroke swimmer.

=== 2022 ===
==== 2022 World Championships ====
At the 2022 World Aquatics Championships, contested at Danube Arena in Budapest, Hungary, Grousset won the silver medal in the 100 metre freestyle, finishing with a time of 47.64 seconds, which was 0.06 seconds behind gold medalist David Popovici of Romania. He also won the bronze medal in the 50 metre freestyle with a time of 21.57 seconds, finishing 0.25 seconds behind gold medalist Ben Proud of Great Britain and 0.16 seconds behind silver medalist Michael Andrew of the United States.

==== 2022 European Championships ====
Grousset started competition on day one of the 2022 European Aquatics Championships, held in Rome, Italy, ranking second in the preliminaries of the 50 metre butterfly with a time of 23.20 seconds and advancing to the semifinals. In the semifinals, he ranked second across both heats, qualifying for the final with a personal best time of 22.90 seconds. Day two of competition, in the morning preliminaries of the 100 metre freestyle, he ranked fourth and qualified for the evening semifinals with a time of 48.31 seconds. In the evening session, he won the silver medal in the 50 metre butterfly with a time of 22.97 seconds, 0.08 seconds behind gold medalist Thomas Ceccon of Italy. Later in the session, he lowered his time to a 48.15 for the semifinals of the 100 metre freestyle and qualified for the final ranking fifth. In the final of the 100 metre freestyle the following day, he placed fourth with a time of 47.78 seconds, finishing 0.15 seconds behind bronze medalist Alessandro Miressi of Italy.

On the fourth day, Grousset led-off the 4×100 metre freestyle relay in the final with a 47.69 before the relay was disqualified for an early start by the second swimmer. The next day, he swam the lead-off leg of the 4×100 metre mixed freestyle relay, contributing a 48.02 to the final mark of 3:22.80 to win the gold medal. For the preliminaries of the 50 metre freestyle in the morning on day six, he tied Diogo Ribeiro of Portugal for fourteenth rank with a time of 22.23 seconds and qualified for the semifinals. In the evening semifinals, he brought his time down to a 21.75, ranking fifth overall and qualifying for the final. The seventh day, he placed fifth in the final of the 50 metre freestyle with a time of 21.87 seconds. Later in the session, he won a silver medal as part of the 4×100 metre medley relay, anchoring the relay to a finish in 3:32.50 with a split time of 47.43 seconds.

==== 2022 Swimming World Cup ====
In the 100 metre freestyle at the 2022 FINA Swimming World Cup stop held in Berlin, Germany, Grousset won the silver medal with a time of 46.38 seconds, finishing 0.50 seconds behind gold medalist Kyle Chalmers. For his other events, he placed sixth in the 50 metre freestyle with a time of 21.31 seconds and ninth in the 50 metre butterfly with a time of 22.98 seconds.

==== 2022 World Short Course Championships ====
Achieving a personal best time of 45.77 seconds in the preliminaries of the 100 metre freestyle on day two of the 2022 World Short Course Championships, held in December in Melbourne, Australia, Grousset qualified for the semifinals ranking second overall. In the evening semifinals, he lowered his personal best time to a 45.58 and qualified for the final ranking second. The morning of day three, he ranked first across all preliminary heats in the 100 metre individual medley with a time of 51.94 seconds and advanced to the semifinals. Finishing in a personal best time of 45.41 seconds in the evening final of the 100 metre freestyle, he won the silver medal. He was subsequently disqualified in the semifinals of the 100 metre individual medley in the same session.

The morning of day four, Grousset split a 20.76 for the second leg of the 4×50 metre mixed freestyle relay to help advance the relay with a time of 1:29.69 to the final ranking first. Then he tied in rank for tenth in the preliminaries of the 50 metre freestyle with a time of 21.13 seconds and advanced to the semifinals. In the evening session, he led-off the finals relay with a 20.92 to contribute to a new world record time of 1:27.33 and winning the gold medal. Approximately 65 minutes later, he ranked eighth in the semifinals of the 50 metre freestyle with a personal best time of 20.97 seconds and qualified for the final. The following morning, he split a 22.18 for the butterfly leg of the 4×50 metre medley relay, helping qualify for the final ranking second with a 1:32.53. On the finals relay, he lowered his time to a 21.90, helping achieve a fifth-place finish in a time of 1:31.41. Later in the session, he placed fifth in the final of the 50 metre freestyle, finishing in a personal best time of 20.90 seconds. On the sixth, and final, day, he achieved a personal best time of 1:41.79 in the preliminaries of the 200 metre freestyle to qualify for the evening final ranking third. Improving his personal best mark to a 1:41.56 in the final, he placed sixth.

=== 2023 ===
At the 2023 Camille Muffat Meeting in March in Nice, Grousset won the silver medal in the 100 metre freestyle with a 48.97, finishing 0.02 seconds behind Szebasztián Szabó of Hungary. Three days later, he won the gold medal in the 100 metre freestyle at the 2023 Giant Open with a time of 48.50 seconds. The day before, 18 March, he won the 100 metre butterfly with a personal best time of 51.72 seconds. On 11 June, day one of the 2023 French Elite Swimming Championships in Rennes, he won the gold medal in the 50 metre butterfly with a time of 23.06 seconds. On the third evening, he won the gold medal in the 100 metre freestyle with a 2023 World Aquatics Championships qualifying time of 47.62 seconds, which also ranked him as the third-fastest performer in the event for the 2023 year, 0.40 seconds behind first-ranked Pan Zhanle of China. Two evening sessions later, he won the silver medal in the 50 metre freestyle with a World Championships qualifying time of 21.78 seconds, finishing 0.16 seconds after gold medalist Florent Manaudou.

== International championships (50 m) ==
Meet	50 freestyle	100 freestyle	50 butterfly	100 butterfly	4×100 freestyle	4×100 medley	4×100 mixed freestyle
Junior level
EJC 2016	14th	49th	15th	6th			
EJC 2017	3rd place, bronze medalist(s)	7th	3rd place, bronze medalist(s)		4th		
WJC 2017	2nd place, silver medalist(s)	6th			5th		
Senior level
EC 2018	16th	22nd			9th		(gold) ^{[a]}
WC 2019	9th		14th				(bronze) ^{[a]}
EC 2020	7th	5th	9th			5th	
OG 2020	12th	4th	—N/a		6th		—N/a
WC 2022	3rd place, bronze medalist(s)	2nd place, silver medalist(s)	9th			5th	
EC 2022	5th	4th	2nd place, silver medalist(s)		DSQ	2nd place, silver medalist(s)	1st place, gold medalist(s)
WC 2023	DNS	3rd place, bronze medalist(s)	3rd place, bronze medalist(s)	1st place, gold medalist(s)		4th	
OG 2024	WD	5th		5th		3rd place, bronze medalist(s)	
WC 2025	DNS	7th	1st place, gold medalist(s)	1st place, gold medalist(s)		2nd place, silver medalist(s)	3rd place, bronze medalist(s)

^{a} Grousset swam only in the preliminaries.

== International championships (25 m) ==
Meet	50 freestyle	100 freestyle	200 freestyle	50 butterfly	100 medley	4×50 freestyle	4×50 medley	4×100 medley	4×50 mixed freestyle
EC 2017	24th	23rd				14th	15th	—N/a	
EC 2019	16th	4th					11th	—N/a	3rd place, bronze medalist(s)
WC 2021	6th	5th		17th				DSQ	6th
WC 2022	5th	2nd place, silver medalist(s)	6th		DSQ		5th		1st place, gold medalist(s)

== Personal best times ==
=== Long course metres (50 m pool) ===
Event	Time	Meet	Location	Date	Ref
50 m freestyle	21.51	17th Meeting National des Hortillons	Amiens, France	19 December 2025	
100 m freestyle	47.33	2024 French Elite Swimming Championships	Chartres, France	18 June 2024	
50 m butterfly	22.48	2025 World Aquatics Championships	Singapore	28 July 2025	
100 m butterfly	49.62 ER	2025 World Aquatics Championships	Singapore	2 August 2025	

=== Short course metres (25 m pool) ===
Event	Time	Meet	Location	Date	Ref
50 m freestyle	20.81	2025 European Short Course Championships (25 m)	Lublin, Poland	7 December 2025	
100 m freestyle	45.41	2022 World Short Course Championships	Melbourne, Australia	15 December 2022	
200 m freestyle	1:41.56	2022 World Short Course Championships	Melbourne, Australia	18 December 2022	
50 m butterfly	22.89	2019 French Short Course Championships	Angers	14 December 2019	
100 m individual medley	51.49	2022 French Short Course Championships	Chartres	3 November 2022	

== Swimming World Cup circuits ==
The following medals Grousset has won at Swimming World Cup circuits.

Edition	Gold medals	Silver medals	Bronze medals	Total
2019	0	0	1	1
2022	0	1	0	1
Total	0	1	1	2

== World records ==
=== Short course metres (25 m pool) ===
No.	Event	Time	Meet	Date	Location	Status	Ref
1	4×50 m mixed freestyle	1:27.33	2022 World Short Course Championships	16 December 2022	Melbourne, Australia	Former	
