= Swimming at the 2019 World Aquatics Championships – Women's 1500 metre freestyle =

Women's 1500 metre freestyle at the 2019 World Aquatics Championships
- Venue: Nambu University Municipal Aquatics Center
- Location: Gwangju, South Korea
- Dates: 22 July (heats); 23 July (final)
- Competitors: 29 from 23 nations
- Winning time: 15:40.89

Medalists
gold medal	Simona Quadarella	Italy
silver medal	Sarah Köhler	Germany
bronze medal	Wang Jianjiahe	China

The Women's 1500 metre freestyle competition at the 2019 World Championships was held on 22 and 23 July 2019. The defending champion was Katie Ledecky, but she was forced to withdraw due to illness.

== Records ==
Prior to the competition, the existing world and championship records were as follows.

World record	Katie Ledecky (USA)	15:20.48	Indianapolis, United States	16 May 2018
Competition record	Katie Ledecky (USA)	15:25.48	Kazan, Russia	4 August 2015

== Results ==
=== Heats ===
The heats were started on 22 July at 11:23.

Rank	Heat	Lane	Name	Nationality	Time	Notes
1	3	4	Katie Ledecky	United States	15:48.90	Q, WD
2	2	4	Simona Quadarella	Italy	15:51.59	Q
3	3	6	Sarah Köhler	Germany	15:54.08	Q, NR
4	2	6	Ajna Késely	Hungary	15:54.48	Q
5	2	5	Ashley Twichell	United States	15:56.22	Q
6	2	3	Kiah Melverton	Australia	15:59.92	Q
7	3	5	Wang Jianjiahe	China	16:00.17	Q
8	3	3	Maddy Gough	Australia	16:02.75	Q
9	3	3	Mireia Belmonte	Spain	16:08.37	Q
10	3	7	Tjaša Oder	Slovenia	16:10.14	
11	2	2	Giulia Gabbrielleschi	Italy	16:16.01	
12	2	7	Kristel Köbrich	Chile	16:16.26	
13	3	1	Jimena Pérez	Spain	16:19.61	
14	3	8	Julia Hassler	Liechtenstein	16:25.59	
15	3	0	Anastasiya Kirpichnikova	Russia	16:27.59	
16	2	0	Tamila Holub	Portugal	16:29.57	
17	2	9	Emma O'Croinin	Canada	16:30.46	
18	2	8	Diana Durães	Portugal	16:30.67	
19	1	4	Marlene Kahler	Austria	16:32.00	
20	3	9	Viviane Jungblut	Brazil	16:36.25	
21	1	3	Gan Ching Hwee	Singapore	16:44.65	
22	1	5	Han Da-kyung	South Korea	16:49.13	
23	2	1	Zhang Ke	China	16:50.55	
24	1	7	Arianna Valloni	San Marino	16:56.98	
25	1	2	Ho Nam Wai	Hong Kong	16:59.13	
26	1	6	Matea Sumajstorčić	Croatia	17:02.01	
27	1	8	Julia Arino	Argentina	17:17.99	
28	1	1	Souad Cherouati	Algeria	17:25.12	
29	1	0	Eva Petrovska	North Macedonia	17:35.18	

=== Final ===
The final was held on 23 July at 20:10.

Rank	Lane	Name	Nationality	Time	Notes
1st place, gold medalist(s)	4	Simona Quadarella	Italy	15:40.89	NR
2nd place, silver medalist(s)	5	Sarah Köhler	Germany	15:48.83	NR
3rd place, bronze medalist(s)	7	Wang Jianjiahe	China	15:51.00	
4	6	Ashley Twichell	United States	15:54.19	
5	1	Maddy Gough	Australia	15:59.40	
6	3	Ajna Késely	Hungary	16:01.35	
7	2	Kiah Melverton	Australia	16:01.38	
8	8	Mireia Belmonte	Spain	16:02.10	
