= Swimming at the 2022 Mediterranean Games – Men's 50 metre butterfly =

Men's 50 metre butterfly at the 2022 Mediterranean Games
- Location: Bir El Djir, Algeria
- Dates: 1 July
- Competitors: 19 from 12 nations
- Winning time: 23.38

Medalists
gold medal	Diogo Ribeiro	Portugal
silver medal	Matteo Rivolta	Italy
bronze medal	Kristian Gkolomeev	Greece

The men's 50 metre butterfly competition at the 2022 Mediterranean Games was held on 1 July 2022 at the Aquatic Center of the Olympic Complex in Bir El Djir.

== Records ==
Prior to this competition, the existing world and Mediterranean Games records were as follows:

World record	Andriy Govorov (UKR)	22.27	Rome, Italy	1 July 2018
Mediterranean Games record	Ivan Lenđer (SRB)	23.50	Mersin, Turkey	24 June 2013

The following records were established during the competition:

Date	Event	Name	Nationality	Time	Record
1 July	Final	Diogo Ribeiro	Portugal	23.38	GR

== Results ==
=== Heats ===
The heats were started at 10:10.

Rank	Heat	Lane	Name	Nationality	Time	Notes
1	1	4	Kristian Gkolomeev	Greece	23.70	Q
2	2	6	Mario Mollà	Spain	23.81	Q
3	2	3	Matteo Rivolta	Italy	23.89	Q
4	3	4	Diogo Ribeiro	Portugal	24.03	Q
5	1	5	Stergios Bilas	Greece	24.05	Q
6	1	6	Emre Sakçı	Turkey	24.08	Q
7	3	3	Julien Berol	France	24.09	Q
8	3	6	Jaouad Syoud	Algeria	24.15	Q
9	2	4	Miguel Nascimento	Portugal	24.20	
10	3	5	Ümitcan Güreş	Turkey	24.25	
11	1	3	Gianluca Andolfi	Italy	24.26	
12	1	7	Tomàs Lomero	Andorra	24.47	
13	2	5	Sergueï Comte	France	24.57	
14	3	2	Đurde Matić	Serbia	24.66	
15	2	2	Miguel Martínez	Spain	24.89	
16	3	7	Youcef Bouzouia	Algeria	25.11	
17	1	2	Alessandro Rebosio	San Marino	26.26	
18	2	7	Alush Telaku	Kosovo	26.74	
19	3	1	Drini Ujkashej	Albania	29.88	

=== Final ===
The final was held at 18:04.

Rank	Lane	Name	Nationality	Time	Notes
1st place, gold medalist(s)	6	Diogo Ribeiro	Portugal	23.38	GR
2nd place, silver medalist(s)	3	Matteo Rivolta	Italy	23.59	
3rd place, bronze medalist(s)	4	Kristian Gkolomeev	Greece	23.61	
4	5	Mario Mollà	Spain	23.70	
5	2	Stergios Bilas	Greece	23.71	
6	1	Julien Berol	France	23.87	
7	7	Emre Sakçı	Turkey	23.96	
8	8	Jaouad Syoud	Algeria	24.27	
