= Swimming at the 2019 World Aquatics Championships – Women's 800 metre freestyle =

Women's 800 metre freestyle at the 2019 World Aquatics Championships
- Venue: Nambu University Municipal Aquatics Center
- Location: Gwangju, South Korea
- Dates: 26 July (heats); 27 July (final)
- Competitors: 40 from 32 nations
- Winning time: 8:13.58

Medalists
gold medal	Katie Ledecky	United States
silver medal	Simona Quadarella	Italy
bronze medal	Ariarne Titmus	Australia

The Women's 800-metre freestyle competition at the 2019 World Championships was held on 26 and 27 July 2019. Defending champion Katie Ledecky successfully defended her title in 8:13.58 with a final lap comeback against Italy's Simona Quadarella.

== Records ==
Prior to the competition, the existing world and championship records were as follows.

World record	Katie Ledecky (USA)	8:04.79	Rio de Janeiro, Brazil	12 August 2016
Competition record	Katie Ledecky (USA)	8:07.39	Kazan, Russia	8 August 2015

== Results ==
=== Heats ===
The heats were started on 26 July at 12:05.

Rank	Heat	Lane	Name	Nationality	Time	Notes
1	5	5	Leah Smith	United States	8:17.23	Q
2	5	4	Katie Ledecky	United States	8:17.42	Q
3	5	3	Ariarne Titmus	Australia	8:19.43	Q
4	4	5	Simona Quadarella	Italy	8:20.86	Q
5	4	4	Wang Jianjiahe	China	8:20.91	Q
6	4	3	Sarah Köhler	Germany	8:22.95	Q
7	5	7	Mireia Belmonte	Spain	8:28.22	Q
8	4	6	Kiah Melverton	Australia	8:29.70	Q
9	5	1	Tjaša Oder	Slovenia	8:30.97	
10	5	6	Ajna Késely	Hungary	8:32.34	
11	5	8	Jimena Pérez	Spain	8:32.38	
12	5	2	Anna Egorova	Russia	8:34.73	
13	4	1	Julia Hassler	Liechtenstein	8:34.91	
14	3	3	Giulia Gabbrielleschi	Italy	8:35.03	
15	4	7	Li Bingjie	China	8:37.41	
16	5	0	Anastasiya Kirpichnikova	Russia	8:37.90	
17	3	5	Tamila Holub	Portugal	8:38.77	
18	4	8	Mackenzie Padington	Canada	8:39.58	
19	5	9	Viviane Jungblut	Brazil	8:42.52	
20	4	9	Diana Durães	Portugal	8:44.37	
21	3	6	Eve Thomas	New Zealand	8:44.65	
22	3	4	Marlene Kahler	Austria	8:45.13	
23	3	2	Gan Ching Hwee	Singapore	8:47.88	
24	3	8	Duné Coetzee	South Africa	8:47.97	
25	2	5	Matea Sumajstorčić	Croatia	8:48.61	NR
26	3	7	Han Da-kyung	South Korea	8:49.90	
27	4	2	Boglárka Kapás	Hungary	8:50.13	
28	3	9	Hanna Eriksson	Sweden	8:52.14	
29	2	2	Arianna Valloni	San Marino	8:52.85	
30	2	4	Ho Nam Wai	Hong Kong	8:53.37	
31	2	3	Laura Lahtinen	Finland	8:54.94	
32	3	0	Nicole Oliva	Philippines	8:55.50	
33	2	6	Ammiga Himathongkom	Thailand	8:57.83	
34	2	8	Julia Arino	Argentina	9:04.02	
35	2	7	Souad Cherouati	Algeria	9:12.30	
36	1	4	Eva Petrovska	North Macedonia	9:12.71	
37	2	0	Gabriella Doueihy	Lebanon	9:19.78	
38	1	3	Talita Te Flan	Ivory Coast	9:21.19	
39	1	5	Raya Embury-Brown	Cayman Islands	9:22.69	
40	2	1	Diana Zlobina	Kazakhstan	9:31.05	
	3	1	Joanna Evans	Bahamas	DNS	
	4	0	Kristel Köbrich	Chile	DNS	

=== Final ===
The final was started on 27 July at 21:25.

Rank	Lane	Name	Nationality	Time	Notes
1st place, gold medalist(s)	5	Katie Ledecky	United States	8:13.58	
2nd place, silver medalist(s)	6	Simona Quadarella	Italy	8:14.99	NR
3rd place, bronze medalist(s)	3	Ariarne Titmus	Australia	8:15.70	OC
4	7	Sarah Köhler	Germany	8:16.43	NR
5	4	Leah Smith	United States	8:17.10	
6	2	Wang Jianjiahe	China	8:18.57	
7	8	Kiah Melverton	Australia	8:25.07	
8	1	Mireia Belmonte	Spain	8:25.51	
