= List of Portuguese records in swimming =

Below is a complete list of the Portuguese records in swimming, which are ratified by Portuguese Swimming Federation (FPN).

== Long course (50 m) ==
=== Men ===
Event	Time		Name	Club	Date	Meet	Location	Ref
50m freestyle	21.59		Diogo Ribeiro	Portugal	16 August 2026	European Championships	Paris, France	
100m freestyle	47.98		Diogo Ribeiro	Benfica	31 March 2023	Portugal Open	Funchal, Portugal	
200m freestyle	1:47.97		Miguel Nascimento	Benfica	6 April 2019	Portuguese Championships	Coimbra, Portugal	
400m freestyle	3:50.56		José Lopes	Portugal	6 June 2021	Mare Nostrum	Barcelona, Spain	
800m freestyle	7:52.68		José Lopes	Portugal	22 May 2021	European Championships	Budapest, Hungary	
1500m freestyle	15:15.12		Guilherme Pina	Sporting CP	30 March 2017	Portuguese Championships	Coimbra, Portugal	
50m backstroke	25.25	h	João Costa	Vitória Sport Clube	4 April 2025	Portuguese Championships	Oeiras, Portugal	
100m backstroke	53.71	h	João Costa	Portugal	24 July 2023	World Championships	Fukuoka, Japan	
200m backstroke	1:57.06		Francisco Santos	Sporting CP	6 June 2021	International Meet	Porto, Portugal	
50m breaststroke	27.92	b	Alexandre Amorim	Vitória Sport Clube	15 April 2025	Swim Open Stockholm	Stockholm, Sweden	
100m breaststroke	1:01.01	h	Carlos Almeida	Portugal	28 July 2013	World Championships	Barcelona, Spain	
200m breaststroke	2:11.92	h	Gabriel Lopes	Portugal	13 August 2022	European Championships	Rome, Italy	
50m butterfly	22.77		Diogo Ribeiro	Portugal	28 July 2025	World Championships	Singapore, Singapore	
50m butterfly	22.68	sf, #	Diogo Ribeiro	Portugal	10 August 2026	European Championships	Paris, France	
100m butterfly	51.17		Diogo Ribeiro	Portugal	17 February 2024	World Championships	Doha, Qatar	
200m butterfly	1:56.17	h	Pedro Oliveira	Portugal	28 July 2009	World Championships	Rome, Italy	
200m individual medley	1:58.19		Alexis Santos	Sporting CP	6 April 2019	Portuguese Championships	Coimbra, Portugal	
400m individual medley	4:15.84	h	Alexis Santos	Portugal	6 August 2016	Olympic Games	Rio de Janeiro, Brazil	
4×50m freestyle relay	1:29.80	not ratified	Miguel Nascimento (22.20); Miguel Marques (22.18); Diogo Lebre (23.05); Diogo Costa (22.37)	Benfica	27 July 2022	Portuguese Open	Oeiras, Portugal	
4×100m freestyle relay	3:20.66	not ratified	Miguel Nascimento (49.88); Diogo Ribeiro (48.22); Francisco Santos (50.74); João Costa (51.82)	Portugal	3 July 2022	Mediterranean Games	Oran, Algeria	
4×200m freestyle relay	7:16.48		Diogo Carvalho; Jorge Maia; Fábio Pereira; César Faria	Portugal	31 July 2009	World Championships	Rome, Italy	
4×50m medley relay	1:41.67	not ratified	Francisco Santos (26.10); Francisco Quintas (27.91); Tiago Costa (24.80); Alexis Santos (22.86)	Sporting CP	29 July 2022	Portuguese Open	Oeiras, Portugal	
4×100m medley relay	3:37.50	not ratified	João Costa (54.45); Gabriel Lopes (1:01.45); Diogo Ribeiro (52.80); Miguel Nascimento (48.80)	Portugal	4 July 2022	Mediterranean Games	Oran, Algeria	
4×100m medley relay	3:35.63	h, =, not ratified	João Costa (54.13); Gabriel Lopes (1:00.57); Diogo Ribeiro (51.76); Miguel Nascimento (49.17)	Portugal	30 July 2023	World Championships	Fukuoka, Japan	
4×100m medley relay	3:35.63	h, =, not ratified	Gabriel Lopes (54.80); Francisco Robalo (1:01.15); Diogo Ribeiro (51.26); Miguel Nascimento (48.42)	Portugal	18 February 2024	World Championships	Doha, Qatar	

Legend: # – Record awaiting ratification by FPN; WR – World record; ER – European record;
Records not set in finals: h – heat; sf – semifinal; r – relay 1st leg; rh – relay heat 1st leg; b – B final; † – en route to final mark; so – swim-off; tt – time trial

=== Women ===
Event	Time		Name	Club	Date	Meet	Location	Ref
50m freestyle	25.25		Ana Rodrigues	Desportiva de Viana	30 March 2023	Portugal Open	Funchal, Portugal	
100m freestyle	55.30		Francisca Martins	Foca Quinta Da Lixa - CNF	26 July 2026	Portugal Championships	Oeiras, Portugal	
200m freestyle	1:57.85		Francisca Martins	Portugal	22 July 2025	World University Games	Berlin, Germany	
400m freestyle	4:06.93		Francisca Martins	Portugal	16 August 2026	European Championships	Paris, France	
800m freestyle	8:29.33		Diana Durães	Portugal	23 June 2018	Mediterranean Games	Tarragona, Spain	
1500m freestyle	16:15.12		Diana Durães	Benfica	9 February 2020	Lisbon International Meeting	Lisbon, Portugal	
50m backstroke	28.24		Rafaela Azevedo	Sport Algés e Dafundo	23 December 2021	Jamor Open	Oeiras, Portugal	
100m backstroke	59.90	sf	Camila Rebelo	Portugal	14 August 2026	European Championships	Paris, France	
200m backstroke	2:08.95		Camila Rebelo	Portugal	18 June 2024	European Championships	Belgrade, Serbia	
200m backstroke	2:07.62	#	Camila Rebelo	Portugal	11 August 2026	European Championships	Paris, France	
50m breaststroke	30.73	h	Ana Rodrigues	Desportiva de Viana	10 June 2023	Porto International Meeting	Porto, Portugal	
100m breaststroke	1:08.22		Ana Rodrigues	Desportiva de Viana	11 June 2023	Porto International Meeting	Porto, Portugal	
200m breaststroke	2:25.67	sf	Victoria Kaminskaya	Portugal	25 July 2019	World Championships	Gwangju, South Korea	
50m butterfly	26.58		Ana Guedes	Ginasio de Vila Real	6 June 2021	International Meet	Porto, Portugal	
100m butterfly	58.76	sf	Sara Oliveira	Portugal	12 August 2010	European Championships	Budapest, Hungary	
200m butterfly	2:08.03		Ana Monteiro	Portugal	6 August 2018	European Championships	Glasgow, United Kingdom	
200m individual medley	2:13.87		Victoria Kaminskaya	Portugal	10 April 2017	Spanish Championships	Pontevedra, Spain	
400m individual medley	4:40.11		Victoria Kaminskaya	Portugal	9 April 2017	Spanish Championships	Pontevedra, Spain	
4×50m freestyle relay	1:46.22	not ratified	Marta Marinho (26.50); Sara Loureiro (26.81); Alexandra Oliveira (26.99); Sara Oliveira (25.92)	FC Porto	1 April 2011	Portuguese Championships	Rio Maior, Portugal	
4×100m freestyle relay	3:50.23		Maria Moura (58.90); Carolina Viana (58.85); Laura Barbeito (56.69); Anna Fomina (55.79)	Sporting CP	30 March 2026	Portuguese Championships	Coimbra, Portugal	
4×200m freestyle relay	8:13.42		Diana Durães (2:02.62); Rita Frischknecht (2:02.41); Ana Monteiro (2:03.57); Tamila Holub (2:04.82)	Portugal	23 June 2018	Mediterranean Games	Tarragona, Spain	
4×200m freestyle relay	8:01.21	h, #	Francisca Martins (1:57.87); Anna Fomina (1:59.24); Ema Conceicao (2:01.75); Mariana Cunha (2:02.35)	Portugal	10 August 2026	European Championships	Paris, France	
4×50m medley relay	1:56.39	not ratified	Rafaela Azevedo (28.64); Raquel Pereira (32.87); Rita Frischknecht (29.00); Ana Sousa (25.88)	Sport Algés e Dafundo	3 August 2019	Portuguese Open	Funchal, Portugal	
4×100m medley relay	4:05.26	h, not ratified	Camila Rebelo (1:01.13); Ana Rodrigues (1:08.89); Mariana Cunha (59.00); Francisca Martins (56.24)	Portugal	16 February 2024	World Championships	Doha, Qatar	

Legend: # – Record awaiting ratification by FPN; WR – World record; ER – European record;
Records not set in finals: h – heat; sf – semifinal; r – relay 1st leg; rh – relay heat 1st leg; b – B final; † – en route to final mark; so – swim-off; tt – time trial

=== Mixed relay ===
Event	Time	Name	Club	Date	Meet	Location	Ref
4×50 m freestyle relay	1:40.41	Porfirio Braga; Mariana Pacheco; Francisca Soares; Tomes Teixeira	AN Norte de Portugal	14 May 2022	Trofeo Internacional Villa de Gijón	Gijón, Spain	
4×100 m freestyle relay	3:31.22	Diogo Lebre (50.28); Gustavo Carvalhais (49.78); Anna Fomina (56.38); Francisca Martins (54.78)	Portugal	21 July 2025	World University Games	Berlin, Germany	
4×50 m medley relay	1:49.28	Joao Nogueira; Joao Campelo; Mariana Pacheco; Francisca Soares	AN Norte de Portugal	15 May 2022	Trofeo Internacional Villa de Gijón	Gijón, Spain	
4×100 m medley relay	3:50.20	Camila Rebelo (1:01.06); Gabriel Lopes (1:01.33); Vasco Alves Morgado (53.04); Francisca Martins (54.77)	Portugal	23 August 2026	Mediterranean Games	Taranto, Italy	

Legend: # – Record awaiting ratification by FPN; WR – World record; ER – European record;
Records not set in finals: h – heat; so – swim-off

== Short Course (25 m) ==
=== Men ===
Event	Time		Name	Club	Date	Meet	Location	Ref
50m freestyle	21.15		Diogo Ribeiro	Benfica	13 December 2025	Portuguese Championships	Leiria, Portugal	
100m freestyle	46.55	r	Diogo Ribeiro	Benfica	15 December 2024	Portuguese Championships	Tomar, Portugal	
200m freestyle	1:43.16	r	Miguel Nascimento	Portugal	14 December 2018	World Championships	Hangzhou, China	
400m freestyle	3:42.57	h	José Lopes	Portugal	16 December 2021	World Championships	Abu Dhabi, United Arab Emirates	
800m freestyle	7:41.51		José Lopes	Braga	14 April 2024	Felgueiras International Meeting	Felgueiras, Portugal	
1500m freestyle	14:39.82	h	José Lopes	Portugal	20 December 2021	World Championships	Abu Dhabi, United Arab Emirates	
50m backstroke	23.35	sf	Alexis Santos	Portugal	18 December 2021	World Championships	Abu Dhabi, United Arab Emirates	
100m backstroke	50.82		Gabriel Lopes	Louzan Natacao	11 December 2022	Portuguese Championships	Leiria, Portugal	
200m backstroke	1:52.66	h	Gabriel Lopes	Portugal	16 December 2018	World Championships	Hangzhou, China	
50m breaststroke	27.01		Alexandre Amorim	Vitoria	14 April 2024	Felgueiras International Meeting	Felgueiras, Portugal	
100m breaststroke	58.19	sf	Carlos Almeida	Portugal	22 November 2012	European Championships	Chartres, France	
200m breaststroke	2:05.59		Carlos Almeida	Portugal	25 November 2012	European Championships	Chartres, France	
50m butterfly	22.48	h	Diogo Ribeiro	Benfica	14 December 2025	Portuguese Championships	Leiria, Portugal	
100m butterfly	50.12		Diogo Ribeiro	Benfica	14 December 2024	Portuguese Championships	Tomar, Portugal	
200m butterfly	1:53.39	h	Diogo Carvalho	Portugal	12 December 2009	European Championships	Istanbul, Turkey	
100m individual medley	52.73	sf	Alexis Santos	Portugal	7 December 2019	European Championships	Glasgow, Great Britain	
200m individual medley	1:53.45		Diogo Carvalho	Portugal	4 December 2015	European Championships	Netanya, Israel	
400m individual medley	4:05.87		Gabriel Lopes	Benfica	9 December 2022	Portuguese Championships	Leiria, Portugal	
4×50m freestyle relay	1:26.91		Miguel Nascimento (21.22); Miguel Marques (21.75); Diogo Costa (22.62); Diogo Ribeiro (21.32)	Benfica	9 December 2022	Portuguese Championships	Leiria, Portugal	
4×100m freestyle relay	3:12.55		Diogo Ribeiro (46.55); Diogo Costa (49.46); Gustavo Ribeiro (48.65); Miguel Nascimento (47.89)	Benfica	15 December 2024	Portuguese Championships	Tomar, Portugal	
4×200m freestyle relay	6:59.28		Miguel Nascimento (1:43.16); Alexis Santos (1:43.43); Gabriel Lopes (1:46.06); Diogo Carvalho (1:46.63)	Portugal	14 December 2018	World Championships	Hangzhou, China	
4×50m medley relay	1:33.82		João Costa (23.90); Gabriel Lopes (26.64); Diogo Ribeiro (22.35); Miguel Nascimento (20.93)	Portugal	6 December 2023 (Note: by official result source; 6 December 2003 by FPN source, a typo)	European Championships	Otopeni, Romania	
4×100m medley relay	3:30.21	h	Gabriel Lopes (52.38); Diogo Carvalho (59.51); Alexis Santos (51.68); Miguel Nascimento (46.64)	Portugal	11 December 2016	World Championships	Windsor, Canada	

Legend: # – Record awaiting ratification by FPN; WR – World record; ER – European record;
Records not set in finals: h – heat; sf – semifinal; r – relay 1st leg; rh – relay heat 1st leg; b – B final; † – en route to final mark; so – swim-off; tt – time trial

=== Women ===
Event	Time		Name	Club	Date	Meet	Location	Ref
50 m freestyle	24.94		Patrícia Conceição	C. N. Amadora	20 December 2009	Portuguese Club Championships	Loures, Portugal	
100 m freestyle	54.66		Ana Rodrigues	Sanjoanense	20 December 2019	Portuguese Championships	Felgueiras, Portugal	
200 m freestyle	1:55.91		Francisca Martins	Foca Quinta da Lixa CNF	12 April 2025	Felgueiras International Meeting	Felgueiras, Portugal	
400 m freestyle	4:04.57		Francisca Martins	Portugal	10 December 2023	European Championships	Otopeni, Romania	
800 m freestyle	8:20.97	h	Diana Durães	Portugal	4 December 2019	European Championships	Glasgow, Great Britain	
1500 m freestyle	15:55.19		Diana Durães	S.L. Benfica	23 November 2019	Regional Championships	Felgueiras, Portugal	
50m backstroke	27.16	sf	Camila Rebelo	Portugal	6 December 2025	European Championships	Lublin, Poland	
100m backstroke	57.79	h	Camila Rebelo	Portugal	4 December 2025	European Championships	Lublin, Poland	
200m backstroke	2:03.51		Camila Rebelo	Portugal	3 December 2025	European Championships	Lublin, Poland	
50m breaststroke	29.98		Ana Rodrigues	Braga	13 December 2025	Portuguese Championships	Leiria, Portugal	
100m breaststroke	1:06.41		Ana Rodrigues	Braga	14 December 2025	Portuguese Championships	Leiria, Portugal	
200m breaststroke	2:22.12		Raquel Pereira	Alges e Dafundo	29 June 2019	Tournament of Sport Alges and Dafundo	Algés, Portugal	
50m butterfly	26.12		Ana Guedes	Ginasio de Vila Real	23 April 2023	Felgueiras International Meeting	Felgueiras, Portugal	
100m butterfly	57.93		Mariana Cunha	Colegio Efanor	16 December 2025	Portuguese Championships	Leiria, Portugal	
200m butterfly	2:05.74		Ana Monteiro	Portugal	12 December 2018	World Championships	Hangzhou, China	
100m individual medley	1:00.19	=	Mariana Cunha	Colegio Efanor	13 April 2025	Felgueiras International Meeting	Felgueiras, Portugal	
100m individual medley	1:00.19	=	Mariana Cunha	Colegio Efanor	15 December 2025	Portuguese Championships	Leiria, Portugal	
200m individual medley	2:11.70		Camila Rebelo	Louzan Natacao	14 December 2024	Portuguese Championships	Tomar, Portugal	
400m individual medley	4:36.19		Victoria Kaminskaya	Portugal	13 December 2017	European Championships	Copenhagen, Denmark	
4×50m freestyle relay	1:41.99	h	Ana Guedes (25.99); Mariana Cunha (25.20); Francisca Martins (25.36); Camila Rebelo (25.44)	Portugal	5 December 2023	European Championships	Otopeni, Romania	
4×100m freestyle relay	3:42.27		Laura Barbeito (56.21); Maria Moura (56.38); Carolina Viana (56.36); Anna Fomina (53.32)	Sporting CP	20 December 2025	Portuguese Club Championships	Quarteira, Portugal	
4×200m freestyle relay	8:03.35		Leticia Andre (2:02.31); Catarina Franco (2:01.02); Ema Conceicao (1:59.66); Diana Durães (2:00.36)	Benfica	22 December 2023	Portuguese Club Championships	Felgueiras, Portugal	
4×50m medley relay	1:49.10	h	Camila Rebelo (27.55); Ana Rodrigues (29.91); Ana Guedes (26.40); Mariana Cunha (25.24)	Portugal	7 December 2025	European Championships	Lublin, Poland	
4×100m medley relay	4:05.43		Maelie Fonseca (1:01.39); Madalena Cerdeira (1:09.42); Maria Moura (1:00.28); Anna Fomina (54.34)	Sporting CP	20 December 2025	Portuguese Club Championships	Quarteira, Portugal	

Legend: # – Record awaiting ratification by FPN; WR – World record; ER – European record;
Records not set in finals: h – heat; sf – semifinal; r – relay 1st leg; rh – relay heat 1st leg; b – B final; † – en route to final mark; so – swim-off; tt – time trial

=== Mixed relay ===
Event	Time		Name	Club	Date	Meet	Location	Ref
4×50 m freestyle relay	1:34.61	h	Miguel Nascimento (21.80); Alexandre Amorim (22.37); Mariana Cunha (25.47); Ana Rodrigues (24.97)	Portugal	4 December 2025	European Championships	Lublin, Poland	
4×100 m freestyle relay	3:38.72			FC Porto	14 November 2021	Felguerias, Portugal		
4×50 m medley relay	1:44.20		Miguel Duarte Nascimento; Rebeca Leonor Antunes; Diogo Matos Ribeiro; Rita Barros Frischnecht	Sport Lisboa e Benfica	14 December 2025	Portuguese Championships	Leiria, Portugal	
4×50 m medley relay	1:42.17	h, not ratified	Camila Rebelo (27.81); Gabriel Lopes (26.97); Ana Guedes (26.38); Miguel Nascimento (21.01)	Portugal	10 December 2023	European Championships	Otopeni, Romania	
4×100 m medley relay	3:58.31			Vitoria	14 November 2021	Felguerias, Portugal		

Legend: # – Record awaiting ratification by FPN; WR – World record; ER – European record;
Records not set in finals: h – heat; so – swim-off
