= Swimming at the 2026 European Aquatics Championships – Men's 100 metre butterfly =

Men's 100 metre butterfly at the 2026 European Aquatics Championships
- Venue: Paris Aquatic Centre
- Dates: 12 August (heats and semifinals); 13 August (final)
- Competitors: 66 from 31 nations
- Winning time: 49.48 ER, CR

Medalists
gold medal	Kristóf Milák	Hungary
silver medal	Maxime Grousset	France
bronze medal	Noè Ponti	Switzerland

The Men's 100 metre butterfly competition of the 2026 European Aquatics Championships was held on 12 and 13 August 2026.

== Records ==
Prior to the competition, the existing world, European and championship records were as follows.

	Time	Swimmer	Location	Date
World record	49.45	Caeleb Dressel (USA)	(Japan) Tokyo	31 July 2021
European record	49.62	Maxime Grousset (FRA)	Singapore	2 August 2025
Championship record	50.18	Kristóf Milák (HUN)	(Hungary) Budapest	23 May 2021

== Results ==
=== Heats ===
The heats were started on 12 August 2026.
Qualification Rules: The 16 fastest from the heats qualify to the semifinals.

Ranks	Heats	Lane	Swimmer	Country	Time	Notes
1	6	4	Noè Ponti	Switzerland	50.47	Q
2	5	4	Kristóf Milák	Hungary	50.81	Q
3	7	4	Maxime Grousset	France	51.03	Q
4	7	6	Edward Mildred	Great Britain	51.18	Q
5	6	2	Jakub Majerski	Poland	51.35	Q
6	5	3	Kaii Winkler	Germany	51.38	Q
7	5	2	Denis Popescu	Romania	51.44	Q
8	6	5	Hubert Kós	Hungary	51.49	Q
9	7	8	Alberto Razzetti	Italy	51.70	Q
10	7	3	Andrey Minakov	Neutral Athletes B	51.78	Q
11	6	6	Luca Nik Armbruster	Germany	51.80	Q
12	7	7	Michele Busa	Italy	51.82	Q
13	5	6	Josha Salchow	Germany	51.87	
14	5	5	Roman Shevliakov	Neutral Athletes B	51.96	Q
14	7	1	Lorenzo Gargani	Italy	51.96	
16	6	9	Ihor Troianovskyi	Ukraine	51.98	Q
17	6	7	Ksawery Masiuk	Poland	52.02	Q
18	4	3	Vlad Mihalache	Romania	52.07	Q
19	5	0	Casper Puggaard	Denmark	52.11	R
20	6	8	Joshua Gammon	Great Britain	52.12	R
20	7	2	Jacob Peters	Great Britain	52.12	
22	4	6	Lukas Edl	Austria	52.20	
22	5	8	Richárd Márton	Hungary	52.20	
24	4	4	Isak Fernández	Spain	52.28	
24	7	0	Adrian Jaśkiewicz	Poland	52.28	
26	6	3	Simon Bucher	Austria	52.37	
27	5	7	Björn Kammann	Germany	52.39	
28	6	0	Vili Sivec	Croatia	52.40	
29	4	0	Alex Ahtiainen	Estonia	52.42	
30	4	2	Maro Miknić	Croatia	52.66	
31	4	7	Konstantinos Stamou	Greece	52.78	
32	3	8	Kregor Zirk	Estonia	52.89	
33	3	4	Miloš Milenković	Montenegro	52.91	
34	3	2	Elias Klev	Norway	53.11	
35	7	9	Egor Iurchenko	Neutral Athlete B	53.17	
36	4	9	Ivan Shamshuryn	Neutral Athlete A	53.22	
37	3	5	Rasmus Skovgaard Nickelsen	Denmark	53.25	
37	4	5	Grigori Pekarski	Neutral Athlete A	53.25	
39	1	2	Daniel Krichevsky	Israel	53.30	
40	4	1	Matthew Hamilton	Ireland	53.32	
40	6	1	Martin Espernberger	Austria	53.32	
42	2	4	Tom Sela	Israel	53.37	
43	3	0	Florian Frippiat	Luxembourg	53.49	
44	3	6	Vasco Morgado	Portugal	53.51	
45	1	8	Inbar Ono Danziger	Israel	53.53	
46	3	3	Robin Yeboah	Switzerland	53.54	
47	3	1	Ludvig Bartolek	Sweden	53.61	
48	3	7	Mathias Christensen	Denmark	53.78	
49	5	9	Mateusz Chowaniec	Poland	53.79	
50	2	0	Simen Schmitz-Lund	Norway	53.82	
51	2	6	Lukas Peacock	Denmark	53.91	
52	2	1	Enrico Sottile	Switzerland	53.96	
53	4	8	Melker Rosengren	Sweden	54.05	
54	2	5	Iason Routoulas	Greece	54.13	
55	2	3	Birnir Freyr Hálfdánarson	Iceland	54.38	
56	2	7	Jacob Armon	Ireland	54.72	
57	2	8	Jan Jurčík	Czech Republic	54.74	
58	2	2	Ondřej Slavík	Czech Republic	54.96	
59	1	4	Marius Toscan	Switzerland	55.23	
60	1	7	Ārons Roderts	Latvia	55.57	
61	3	9	Luka Kmetić	Croatia	55.61	
62	1	5	Ísak Dag Brisenfeldt	Faroe Islands	55.71	
63	1	6	Ronens Kermans	Latvia	55.95	
64	2	9	Dmitrijs Tolstihs	Latvia	56.08	
65	1	3	Nathan Cachia	Malta	56.09	
66	1	1	Arion Budima	Kosovo	59.29	
	5	1	Tajus Juška	Lithuania	Did not start	

=== Semifinals ===
The semifinals were started on 12 August at 19:33.
Qualification Rules: The first 2 competitors of each semifinal and the remaining fastest (up to a total of 8 qualified competitors) from the semifinals advance to the final.

Rank	Heat	Lane	Swimmer	Nation	Time	Notes
1	2	4	Noè Ponti	Switzerland	50.21	Q
2	1	4	Kristóf Milák	Hungary	50.50	Q
3	2	5	Maxime Grousset	France	50.78	Q
4	1	6	Hubert Kós	Hungary	51.05	Q
5	1	3	Kaii Winkler	Germany	51.34	Q
6	2	3	Jakub Majerski	Poland	51.37	Q
7	1	2	Andrey Minakov	Neutral Athletes B	51.43	Q
8	1	5	Edward Mildred	Great Britain	51.44	Q
9	2	2	Alberto Razzetti	Italy	51.50	
10	1	1	Ihor Troianovskyi	Ukraine	51.57	
10	2	8	Ksawery Masiuk	Poland	51.57	
12	2	6	Denis Popescu	Romania	51.67	
13	1	7	Michele Busa	Italy	51.72	
14	2	1	Roman Shevliakov	Neutral Athletes B	51.73	
14	2	7	Luca Nik Armbruster	Germany	51.73	
16	1	8	Vlad Mihalache	Romania	52.40	

=== Final ===
The final was held on 13 August at 18:30.

Rank	Lane	Name	Nationality	Time	Notes
1st place, gold medalist(s)	5	Kristóf Milák	Hungary	49.48	ER, CR
2nd place, silver medalist(s)	3	Maxime Grousset	France	49.70	
3rd place, bronze medalist(s)	4	Noè Ponti	Switzerland	49.93	
4	6	Hubert Kós	Hungary	50.25	
5	8	Edward Mildred	Great Britain	51.06	
6	2	Kaii Winkler	Germany	51.08	
7	7	Jakub Majerski	Poland	51.78	
8	1	Andrey Minakov	Neutral Athletes B	51.89	
