= Hau-Li Fan =

Canadian swimmer (born 1997)

Personal information
- Born: September 8, 1997 (age 29) Vancouver, British Columbia, Canada
- Height: 188 cm (6 ft 2 in)
- Weight: 80 kg (176 lb)

Sport
- Country: Canada
- Sport: Swimming
- Event: Open water swimming

Hau-Li Fan (born September 8, 1997) is a Canadian competitive swimmer who specializes in the open water swimming events.

== Career ==
In 2019, Fan finished in seventeenth position in the 10 km event at the 2019 World Aquatics Championships.

At the 2020 Olympic Marathon Swim Qualifier in Setúbal, Portugal, Fan qualified for the 2020 Summer Olympics as the highest finisher from the Americas not yet qualified. Competing in Tokyo, Fan finished ninth in the 10 km marathon.
