= Italy at the 2019 World Aquatics Championships =

- Flag of Italy
- World Aquatics code: ITA
- National federation: Italian Swimming Federation
- Website: federnuoto.it (in Italian)

in Gwangju, South Korea
- Medals Ranked 6th: Gold 4 Silver 6 Bronze 5 Total 15

World Aquatics Championships appearances (overview)
- 1973; 1975; 1978; 1982; 1986; 1991; 1994; 1998; 2001; 2003; 2005; 2007; 2009; 2011; 2013; 2015; 2017; 2019; 2022; 2023; 2024; 2025

Italy competed at the 2019 World Aquatics Championships in Gwangju, South Korea from 12 to 28 July.

== Medalists ==
Medal	Name	Sport	Event	Date
Gold	Simona Quadarella	Swimming	Women's 1500 metre freestyle	23 July
Gold	Gregorio Paltrinieri	Swimming	Men's 800 metre freestyle	24 July
Gold	Federica Pellegrini	Swimming	Women's 200 metre freestyle	24 July
Gold	Italy men's national water polo team: Marco Del Lungo; Pietro Figlioli; Edoardo Di Somma; Vincenzo Dolce; Stefano Luongo; Gianmarco Nicosia; Matteo Aicardi; Michaël Bodegas; Francesco Di Fulvio; Gonzalo Echenique; Niccolò Figari; Vincenzo Renzuto Iodice; Alessandro Velotto	Water polo	Men's tournament	27 July
Silver	Beatrice Callegari; Domiziana Cavanna; Linda Cerruti; Francesca Deidda; Costanza Di Camillo; Costanza Ferro; Gemma Galli; Alessia Pezone; Enrica Piccoli; Federica Sala	Artistic swimming	Women's highlight routine	15 July
Silver	Manila Flamini; Giorgio Minisini	Artistic swimming	Mixed duet technical routine	15 July
Silver	Rachele Bruni; Giulia Gabbrielleschi; Domenico Acerenza; Gregorio Paltrinieri	Open water swimming	Team relay	18 July
Silver	Manila Flamini; Giorgio Minisini	Artistic swimming	Mixed duet free routine	20 July
Silver	Simona Quadarella	Swimming	Women's 800 metre freestyle	27 July
Silver	Benedetta Pilato	Swimming	Women's 50 m breaststroke	28 July
Bronze	Rachele Bruni	Open water swimming	Women's 10 km	14 July
Bronze	Alessio Occhipinti	Open water swimming	Men's 25 km	19 July
Bronze	Gabriele Detti	Swimming	Men's 400 metre freestyle	21 July
Bronze	Martina Carraro	Swimming	Women's 100 metre breaststroke	23 July
Bronze	Gregorio Paltrinieri	Swimming	Men's 1500 metre freestyle	28 July

== Artistic swimming ==
Italy's artistic swimming team consisted of 14 athletes (1 male and 13 female).

Women

Athlete	Event	Preliminaries		Final	
Athlete	Event	Points	Rank	Points	Rank
Linda Cerruti	Solo technical routine	87.8093	6 Q	88.0378	6
Linda Cerruti	Solo free routine	90.2333	6 Q	90.4667	6
Linda Cerruti; Costanza Ferro; Francesca Deidda (R)	Duet technical routine	88.6622	5 Q	90.1743	5
Linda Cerruti; Francesca Deidda; Costanza Ferro (R)	Duet free routine	90.4667	6 Q	91.0000	6
Beatrice Callegari; Domiziana Cavanna; Linda Cerruti; Francesca Deidda; Costanza Di Camillo; Costanza Ferro; Gemma Galli; Enrica Piccoli; Alessia Pezone (R); Federica Sala (R)	Team technical routine	90.1049	5 Q	91.0411	5
Beatrice Callegari; Linda Cerruti; Francesca Deidda; Costanza Di Camillo; Costanza Ferro; Gemma Galli; Alessia Pezone; Enrica Piccoli; Domiziana Cavanna (R); Federica Sala (R)	Team free routine	91.2667	6 Q	91.6000	5
Beatrice Callegari; Domiziana Cavanna; Linda Cerruti; Francesca Deidda; Costanza Di Camillo; Costanza Ferro; Gemma Galli; Alessia Pezone; Enrica Piccoli; Federica Sala; Marta Murru (R); Francesca Zunino (R)	Highlight routine	—N/a		91.7333	2nd place, silver medalist(s)
Beatrice Callegari; Domiziana Cavanna; Linda Cerruti; Francesca Deidda; Costanza Di Camillo; Costanza Ferro; Gemma Galli; Alessia Pezone; Enrica Piccoli; Federica Sala; Marta Murru (R); Francesca Zunino (R)	Free routine combination	90.9000	5 Q	91.4667	5

Mixed

Athlete	Event	Preliminaries		Final	
Athlete	Event	Points	Rank	Points	Rank
Manila Flamini; Giorgio Minisini	Duet technical routine	90.3829	2 Q	90.8511	2nd place, silver medalist(s)
Manila Flamini; Giorgio Minisini	Duet free routine	91.6000	2 Q	91.8333	2nd place, silver medalist(s)

Legend: (R) = Reserve Athlete

== Diving ==
Italy's diving team consisted of 7 athletes (4 male, 3 female).

Men

Athlete	Event	Preliminaries		Semifinals		Final	
Athlete	Event	Points	Rank	Points	Rank	Points	Rank
Lorenzo Marsaglia	1 m springboard	320.45	26	—N/a		did not advance	
Lorenzo Marsaglia	3 m springboard	379.00	23	did not advance			
Giovanni Tocci	1 m springboard	357.50	8 Q	—N/a		344.25	12
Giovanni Tocci	3 m springboard	363.20	30	did not advance			
Riccardo Giovannini	10 m platform	319.30	34	did not advance			
Maicol Verzotto	10 m platform	346.20	24	did not advance			
Lorenzo Marsaglia; Giovanni Tocci	Synchronized 3 m springboard	320.64	17	—N/a		did not advance	

Women

Athlete	Event	Preliminaries		Semifinals		Final	
Athlete	Event	Points	Rank	Points	Rank	Points	Rank
Elena Bertocchi	1 m springboard	232.55	12 Q	—N/a		251.95	6
Elena Bertocchi	3 m springboard	235.45	34	did not advance			
Chiara Pellacani	3 m springboard	290.00	9 Q	275.10	17	did not advance	
Noemi Batki	10 m platform	321.10	6 Q	328.60	5 Q	328.90	8
Elena Bertocchi; Chiara Pellacani	Synchronized 3 m springboard	257.37	12 Q	—N/a		274.74	9
Noemi Batki; Chiara Pellacani	Synchronized 10 m platform	280.86	8 Q	—N/a		280.38	7

Mixed

Athlete	Event	Final	
Athlete	Event	Points	Rank
Maicol Verzotto; Elena Bertocchi	Synchronized 3 m springboard	261.60	13
Maicol Verzotto; Noemi Batki	Synchronized 10 m platform	259.62	6
Riccardo Giovannini; Chiara Pellacani	Team event	301.05	13

== High diving ==
Italy qualified one male high diver.

Athlete	Event	Points	Rank
Alessandro de Rose	Men's high diving	378.90	5

== Open water swimming ==
Italy qualified six male and four female open water swimmers.

Men

Athlete	Event	Time	Rank
Domenico Acerenza	5 km	53:34.0	5
Marcello Guidi	5 km	53:41.0	17
Alessio Occhipinti	25 km	4:51:09.5	3rd place, bronze medalist(s)
Gregorio Paltrinieri	10 km	1:48:01.0	6
Simone Ruffini	25 km	4:51:14.9	4
Mario Sanzullo	10 km	1:48:04.7	9

Women

Athlete	Event	Time	Rank
Arianna Bridi	10 km	1:54:52.0	13
Arianna Bridi	25 km	5:11:52.6	7
Rachele Bruni	5 km	57:58.7	5
Rachele Bruni	10 km	1:54:49.9	3rd place, bronze medalist(s)
Giulia Gabbrielleschi	5 km	57:59.0	6
Barbara Pozzobon	25 km	5:12:53.7	13

Mixed

Athlete	Event	Time	Rank
Rachele Bruni; Giulia Gabbrielleschi; Domenico Acerenza; Gregorio Paltrinieri	Team	53:58.9	2nd place, silver medalist(s)

== Swimming ==
Italy has entered 33 swimmers.

Men

Athlete	Event	Heat		Semifinal		Final	
Athlete	Event	Time	Rank	Time	Rank	Time	Rank
Domenico Acerenza	1500 m freestyle	14:52.03	6 Q	—N/a		14:52.05	6
Federico Burdisso	100 m butterfly	52.65	19	did not advance			
Federico Burdisso	200 m butterfly	1:56.64	10 Q	1:55.92	6 Q	1:54.39	4
Thomas Ceccon	50 m backstroke	25.58	=26	did not advance			
Thomas Ceccon	100 m backstroke	54.04	17 Q	54.20	17	did not advance	
Thomas Ceccon	200 m individual medley	DNS		did not advance			
Piero Codia	50 m butterfly	23.52	14 Q	23.29	=9	did not advance	
Piero Codia	100 m butterfly	53.09	26	did not advance			
Santo Condorelli	100 m freestyle	48.80	18	did not advance			
Marco De Tullio	400 m freestyle	3:45.99	7 Q	—N/a		3:44.86	5
Gabriele Detti	400 m freestyle	3:45.49	4 Q	—N/a		3:43.23 NR	3rd place, bronze medalist(s)
Gabriele Detti	800 m freestyle	7:46.46	4 Q	—N/a		7:43.89	5
Luca Dotto	50 m freestyle	22.48	29	did not advance			
Nicolo Martinenghi	50 m breaststroke	27.00	10 Q	27.31	=14	did not advance	
Nicolo Martinenghi	100 m breaststroke	59.58	14 Q	DSQ		did not advance	
Filippo Megli	200 m freestyle	1:46.95	15 Q	1:45.76	8 Q	1:45.67	5
Alessandro Miressi	100 m freestyle	48.57	8 Q	48.36	9	did not advance	
Gregorio Paltrinieri	800 m freestyle	7:45.70	1 Q	—N/a		7:39.27 ER	1st place, gold medalist(s)
Gregorio Paltrinieri	1500 m freestyle	14:45.80	1 Q	—N/a		14:38.75	3rd place, bronze medalist(s)
Luca Pizzini	200 m breaststroke	2:10.88	21	did not advance			
Matteo Restivo	200 m backstroke	1:57.67	10 Q	1:58.12	14	did not advance	
Simone Sabbioni	50 m backstroke	25.28	17 QR	25.06	14	did not advance	
Simone Sabbioni	100 m backstroke	53.85	13 Q	53.71	12	did not advance	
Fabio Scozzoli	50 m breaststroke	27.11	12 Q	26.70	3 Q	DSQ	
Fabio Scozzoli	100 m breaststroke	59.61	15 Q	59.22	9	did not advance	
Andrea Vergani	50 m freestyle	22.56	=34	did not advance			
Santo Condorelli; Manuel Frigo; Luca Dotto; Alessandro Miressi; Alessandro Bori*	4×100 m freestyle relay	3:12.66	5	—N/a		3:11.39	4
Filippo Megli; Gabriele Detti; Stefano Ballo; Stefano Di Cola; Matteo Ciampi*	4×200 m freestyle relay	7:04.97	1 Q	—N/a		7:02.01	4
Simone Sabbioni; Nicolò Martinenghi; Federico Burdisso; Manuel Frigo	4×100 m medley relay	3:35.23	13	—N/a		did not advance	

Women

Athlete	Event	Heat		Semifinal		Final	
Athlete	Event	Time	Rank	Time	Rank	Time	Rank
Ilaria Bianchi	100 m butterfly	58.26	15 Q	57.92	12	did not advance	
Ilaria Bianchi	200 m butterfly	DNS		did not advance			
Martina Carraro	50 m breaststroke	30.38	3 Q	30.23	4 Q	30.49	5
Martina Carraro	100 m breaststroke	1:06.62	3 Q	1:06.39	4 Q	1:06.36	3rd place, bronze medalist(s)
Martina Carraro	200 m breaststroke	2:27.41	18	did not advance			
Arianna Castiglioni	100 m breaststroke	1:07.09	7 Q	1:06.97; SO: 1:06.39	=8 Q	1:07.06	8
Ilaria Cusinato	200 m butterfly	2:10.03	12 Q	2:09.18	9	did not advance	
Ilaria Cusinato	200 m individual medley	2:12.16	12 Q	2:12.12	12	did not advance	
Ilaria Cusinato	400 m individual medley	4:43.27	16	—N/a		did not advance	
Elena Di Liddo	50 m butterfly	26.03	7 Q	26.16	11	did not advance	
Elena Di Liddo	100 m butterfly	57.18	4 Q	57.04	6 Q	57.07	4
Giulia Gabbrielleschi	800 m freestyle	8:35.03	14	—N/a		did not advance	
Giulia Gabbrielleschi	1500 m freestyle	16:16.01	11	—N/a		did not advance	
Margherita Panziera	100 m backstroke	59.99	9 Q	59.83	11	did not advance	
Margherita Panziera	200 m backstroke	2:08.51	3 Q	2:06.62	3 Q	2:06.67	4
Federica Pellegrini	50 m freestyle	25.08	17	did not advance			
Federica Pellegrini	100 m freestyle	54.68	=22	did not advance			
Federica Pellegrini	200 m freestyle	1:56.81	5 Q	1:55.14	1 Q	1:54.22	1st place, gold medalist(s)
Benedetta Pilato	50 m breaststroke	29.98	1 Q	30.17	3 Q	30.00	2nd place, silver medalist(s)
Simona Quadarella	800 m freestyle	8:20.86	4 Q	—N/a		8:14.99	2nd place, silver medalist(s)
Simona Quadarella	1500 m freestyle	15:51.59	2 Q	—N/a		15:40.89	1st place, gold medalist(s)
Silvia Scalia	50 m backstroke	28.30	17	did not advance			
Silvia Scalia	100 m backstroke	1:00.74	17	did not advance			
Margherita Panziera; Martina Carraro; Elena Di Liddo; Federica Pellegrini; Arianna Castiglioni*; Ilaria Bianchi*	4×100 m medley relay	3:58.35	3 Q	—N/a		3:56.50	4

Mixed

Athlete	Event	Heat		Final	
Athlete	Event	Time	Rank	Time	Rank
Manuel Frigo; Alessandro Miressi; Ilaria Bianchi; Federica Pellegrini	4×100 m freestyle relay	3:25.06	5 Q	3:25.58	8
Simone Sabbioni; Fabio Scozzoli; Elena Di Liddo; Federica Pellegrini; Margherita Panziera*; Nicolò Martinenghi*; Manuel Frigo*	4×100 m medley relay	3:44.38	6 Q	3:43.27	6

Legend: (*) = Swimmers who participated in the heat only.

== Water polo ==
=== Men's tournament ===
Team roster

- Marco del Lungo
- Francesco di Fulvio
- Stefano Luongo
- Pietro Figlioli (C)
- Edoardo di Somma
- Alessandro Velotto
- Vincenzo Renzuto Iodice
- Gonzalo Echenique
- Niccolo Figari
- Michaël Bodegas
- Matteo Aicardi
- Vincenzo Dolce
- Gianmarco Nicosia
- Coach: Alessandro Campagna

Group D

Pos	Team	Pld	W	D	L	GF	GA	GD	Pts	Qualification
1	Italy	3	3	0	0	31	19	+12	6	Quarterfinals
2	Germany	3	1	1	1	31	25	+6	3	Playoffs
3	Japan	3	1	1	1	27	27	0	3	Playoffs
4	Brazil	3	0	0	3	22	40	−18	0	

Source: Sportresult
Rules for classification: 1) points; 2) head-to-head points; 3) head-to-head goal difference; 4) head-to-head number of goals scored; 5) Goal difference.

15 July 2019; 19:10	Report	Brazil	5–14	Italy	Nambu University Aquatics Center, Gwangju; Referees: Stanko Ivanovski (MNE), Jaume Teixidó (ESP)
15 July 2019; 19:10	Report	Score by quarters: 3–5, 1–2, 0–5, 1–2			Nambu University Aquatics Center, Gwangju; Referees: Stanko Ivanovski (MNE), Jaume Teixidó (ESP)
15 July 2019; 19:10	Report	Guimarães 2	Goals	Luongo 4	Nambu University Aquatics Center, Gwangju; Referees: Stanko Ivanovski (MNE), Jaume Teixidó (ESP)

17 July 2019; 16:30	Report	Japan	7–9	Italy	Nambu University Aquatics Center, Gwangju; Referees: Sebastien Dervieux (FRA), Jaume Teixidó (ESP)
17 July 2019; 16:30	Report	Score by quarters: 0–2, 2–1, 4–4, 1–2			Nambu University Aquatics Center, Gwangju; Referees: Sebastien Dervieux (FRA), Jaume Teixidó (ESP)
17 July 2019; 16:30	Report	Arai, Inaba 2	Goals	Figlioli 4	Nambu University Aquatics Center, Gwangju; Referees: Sebastien Dervieux (FRA), Jaume Teixidó (ESP)

19 July 2019; 12:30	Report	Germany	7–8	Italy	Nambu University Aquatics Center, Gwangju; Referees: Stanko Ivanovski (MNE), Daniel Flahive (AUS)
19 July 2019; 12:30	Report	Score by quarters: 2–1, 2–3, 3–2, 0–2			Nambu University Aquatics Center, Gwangju; Referees: Stanko Ivanovski (MNE), Daniel Flahive (AUS)
19 July 2019; 12:30	Report	Eidner 3	Goals	Aicardi, Di Fulvio 2	Nambu University Aquatics Center, Gwangju; Referees: Stanko Ivanovski (MNE), Daniel Flahive (AUS)

Quarterfinals

23 July 2019; 18:30	Report	Italy	7–6	Greece	Nambu University Aquatics Center, Gwangju; Referees: Boris Margeta (SLO), Adrian Alexandrescu (ROU)
23 July 2019; 18:30	Report	Score by quarters: 2-2, 2–1, 2–3, 1–0			Nambu University Aquatics Center, Gwangju; Referees: Boris Margeta (SLO), Adrian Alexandrescu (ROU)
23 July 2019; 18:30	Report	Di Fulvio, Luongo 2	Goals	Genidounias, Gounas 2	Nambu University Aquatics Center, Gwangju; Referees: Boris Margeta (SLO), Adrian Alexandrescu (ROU)

Semifinals

25 July 2019; 18:30	Report	Hungary	10–12	Italy	Nambu University Aquatics Center, Gwangju; Referees: Michiel Zwart (NED), Boris Margeta (SLO)
25 July 2019; 18:30	Report	Score by quarters: 4–2, 1-5, 2-2, 3-3			Nambu University Aquatics Center, Gwangju; Referees: Michiel Zwart (NED), Boris Margeta (SLO)
25 July 2019; 18:30	Report	three players 2	Goals	Echenique 4	Nambu University Aquatics Center, Gwangju; Referees: Michiel Zwart (NED), Boris Margeta (SLO)

Final

27 July 2019; 18:30	Report	Spain	5–10	Italy	Nambu University Aquatics Center, Gwangju; Referees: Boris Margeta (SLO), Michael Goldenberg (USA)
27 July 2019; 18:30	Report	Score by quarters: 2–2, 1–3, 1–3, 1–2			Nambu University Aquatics Center, Gwangju; Referees: Boris Margeta (SLO), Michael Goldenberg (USA)
27 July 2019; 18:30	Report	Perrone 2	Goals	Dolce 2	Nambu University Aquatics Center, Gwangju; Referees: Boris Margeta (SLO), Michael Goldenberg (USA)

=== Women's tournament ===
Team roster

- Giulia Gorlero
- Chiara Tabani
- Arianna Garibotti
- Silvia Avegno
- Elisa Queirolo (C)
- Rosaria Aiello
- Domitilla Picozzi
- Roberta Bianconi
- Giulia Emmolo
- Valeria Palmieri
- Izabella Chiappini
- Giulia Viacava
- Federica Lavi
- Coach: Fabio Conti

Group D

Pos	Team	Pld	W	D	L	GF	GA	GD	Pts	Qualification
1	Italy	3	3	0	0	33	22	+11	6	Quarterfinals
2	Australia	3	2	0	1	32	29	+3	4	Playoffs
3	China	3	1	0	2	26	34	−8	2	Playoffs
4	Japan	3	0	0	3	20	26	−6	0	

Source: Sportresult
Rules for classification: 1) points; 2) head-to-head points; 3) head-to-head goal difference; 4) head-to-head number of goals scored; 5) Goal difference.

14 July 2019; 20:30	Report	Italy	10–9	Australia	Nambu University Aquatics Center, Gwangju; Referees: Sebastien Dervieux (FRA), Germán Moller (ARG)
14 July 2019; 20:30	Report	Score by quarters: 3–0, 3–2, 3–3, 1–4			Nambu University Aquatics Center, Gwangju; Referees: Sebastien Dervieux (FRA), Germán Moller (ARG)
14 July 2019; 20:30	Report	Garibotti 3	Goals	Webster 4	Nambu University Aquatics Center, Gwangju; Referees: Sebastien Dervieux (FRA), Germán Moller (ARG)

16 July 2019; 17:50	Report	Japan	7–9	Italy	Nambu University Aquatics Center, Gwangju; Referees: Gabriella Várkonyi (HUN), Arkadiy Voevodin (RUS)
16 July 2019; 17:50	Report	Score by quarters: 2–3, 2–3, 1–1, 2–2			Nambu University Aquatics Center, Gwangju; Referees: Gabriella Várkonyi (HUN), Arkadiy Voevodin (RUS)
16 July 2019; 17:50	Report	Arima 3	Goals	Bianconi 5	Nambu University Aquatics Center, Gwangju; Referees: Gabriella Várkonyi (HUN), Arkadiy Voevodin (RUS)

18 July 2019; 12:30	Report	Italy	14–6	China	Nambu University Aquatics Center, Gwangju; Referees: Marie-Claude Deslieres (CAN), Nenad Periš (CRO)
18 July 2019; 12:30	Report	Score by quarters: 5–1, 3–1, 4–2, 2–2			Nambu University Aquatics Center, Gwangju; Referees: Marie-Claude Deslieres (CAN), Nenad Periš (CRO)
18 July 2019; 12:30	Report	Garibotti, Tabani 3	Goals	Xiong 2	Nambu University Aquatics Center, Gwangju; Referees: Marie-Claude Deslieres (CAN), Nenad Periš (CRO)

Quarterfinals

22 July 2019; 18:30	Report	Italy	6–7	Hungary	Nambu University Aquatics Center, Gwangju; Referees: Boris Margeta (SLO), Vojin Putniković (SRB)
22 July 2019; 18:30	Report	Score by quarters: 2–4, 2–1, 1–1, 1–1			Nambu University Aquatics Center, Gwangju; Referees: Boris Margeta (SLO), Vojin Putniković (SRB)
22 July 2019; 18:30	Report	six players 1	Goals	Gurisatti, Leimeter 2	Nambu University Aquatics Center, Gwangju; Referees: Boris Margeta (SLO), Vojin Putniković (SRB)

5th–8th place semifinals

24 July 2019; 15:30	Report	Netherlands	5–10	Italy	Nambu University Aquatics Center, Gwangju; Referees: Frank Ohme (GER), Marie-Claude Deslieres (CAN)
24 July 2019; 15:30	Report	Score by quarters: 1–3, 2–3, 1–2, 1–2			Nambu University Aquatics Center, Gwangju; Referees: Frank Ohme (GER), Marie-Claude Deslieres (CAN)
24 July 2019; 15:30	Report	Megens 3	Goals	Avegno 4	Nambu University Aquatics Center, Gwangju; Referees: Frank Ohme (GER), Marie-Claude Deslieres (CAN)

Fifth place game

26 July 2019; 15:30	Report	Russia	10–9	Italy	Nambu University Aquatics Center, Gwangju; Referees: Gabriella Várkonyi (HUN), Sebastien Dervieux (FRA)
26 July 2019; 15:30	Report	Score by quarters: 3–3, 1–2, 5–2, 1–2			Nambu University Aquatics Center, Gwangju; Referees: Gabriella Várkonyi (HUN), Sebastien Dervieux (FRA)
26 July 2019; 15:30	Report	three players 2	Goals	Bianconi, Chiappini 3	Nambu University Aquatics Center, Gwangju; Referees: Gabriella Várkonyi (HUN), Sebastien Dervieux (FRA)
