= Alexandre Yokochi =

Portuguese-born swimmer

Personal information
- Full name: Alexandre Felske Tadayuki Yokochi
- Nationality: Portuguese
- Born: 13 February 1965 (age 61) Lisbon, Portugal
- Height: 1.80 m (5 ft 11 in)
- Weight: 76 kg (168 lb)

Sport
- Sport: Swimming
- Strokes: Breaststroke
- Club: S.L. Benfica
Medal record
Men's swimming
Representing Portugal
European Championships (LC)
Silver medal – second place	1985 Sofia	200 m breaststroke
Summer Universiade
Gold medal – first place	1987 Zagreb	200 m breaststroke
Silver medal – second place	1985 Kobe	200 m breaststroke

Alexandre Felske Tadayuki Yokochi (born 13 February 1965) is a Portuguese-born former swimmer. He now resides in the United States and works as a professor of mechanical engineering at Baylor University.

== Swimming career ==
Born in Lisbon, Portugal, Yokochi was a breaststroke swimmer who broke many Portuguese swimming records. One of his most famous achievements was when he broke both the 100 m and 200 m. He competed in many international competitions such as the European Championships and Olympics whilst representing S.L. Benfica. His 100 m and 200 m records remain unbeaten in the Iberian Peninsula. He was trained by his father, Shintaro Yokochi (1935-2023), who was the head coach of S.L. Benfica and as well of the Portugal national team. Yokochi now resides in the United States as a teacher in Baylor University.

== Professor career ==
Yokochi received an M.S. in 1992 from Southern Illinois University Carbondale under the direction of Prof. Conrad C. Hickley and his Ph.D. from Texas A&M University in 1997 under the direction of F. Albert Cotton. After the completion of his degree, he joined the chemistry faculty at Oregon State University where he was a research professor working in the area of chemical crystallography. From 2004-2017 he was a professor in the School of Chemical, Biological, and Environmental Engineering at Oregon State University. Since 2017, he has been with the School of Engineering & Computer Science at Baylor University as a professor in the Mechanical Engineering department.

Yokochi's current research focuses primarily on problems encompassing advanced functional materials and energy problems including the development of nanocomposite materials, the thermochemical production of hydrogen, the storage of renewable energy using flow batteries, and the development of methodology to avoid biofouling on devices deployed in the ocean.

== Awards ==
- European Vice Champion
- Olympics Finalist 7th and 9th and a B Final Champion
- Latin Champion
- World Championship Finalist
- Record Breaker of the Iberian Peninsula
- Olympic Medal Nobre Guedes
- University of Kobe Vice Champion
- Portuguese National Champion
