= Kai Edwards =

Kai Edwards may refer to:

- Kai Edwards (basketball) (born 1997), Dutch professional basketball player
- Kai Edwards (swimmer) (born 1998), Australian professional swimmer
