= Chile at the 2019 World Aquatics Championships =

- Flag of Chile
- FINA code: CHI
- National federation: Federación Chilena de Deportes Acuáticos
- Website: www.fechida.cl

in Gwangju, South Korea
- Competitors: 8 in 3 sports
- Medals: Gold 0 Silver 0 Bronze 0 Total 0

World Aquatics Championships appearances
- 1973; 1975; 1978; 1982; 1986; 1991; 1994; 1998; 2001; 2003; 2005; 2007; 2009; 2011; 2013; 2015; 2017; 2019; 2022; 2023; 2024

Chile competed at the 2019 World Aquatics Championships in Gwangju, South Korea from 12 to 28 July.

== Artistic swimming ==
Chile's artistic swimming team consisted of 2 athletes (2 female).

Women

Athlete	Event	Preliminaries		Final	
Athlete	Event	Points	Rank	Points	Rank
Isidora Letelier; Natalie Lubascher	Duet technical routine	73.3622	36	did not advance	
Isidora Letelier; Natalie Lubascher	Duet free routine	74.3333	34	did not advance	

== Diving ==
Chile entered three divers.

Men

Athlete	Event	Preliminaries		Semifinals		Final	
Athlete	Event	Points	Rank	Points	Rank	Points	Rank
Diego Carquin	1 m springboard	241.00	41	—		did not advance	
Diego Carquin	3 m springboard	317.70	45	did not advance			
Donato Neglia	3 m springboard	299.50	49	did not advance			

Women

Athlete	Event	Preliminaries		Semifinals		Final	
Athlete	Event	Points	Rank	Points	Rank	Points	Rank
Alison Maillard	1 m springboard	207.85	27	—		did not advance	
Alison Maillard	3 m springboard	190.25	45	did not advance			

Mixed

Athlete	Event	Final	
Athlete	Event	Points	Rank
Donato Neglia; Alison Maillard	3 m synchronized springboard	242.64	17

== Swimming ==
Chile has entered three swimmers.

Men

Athlete	Event	Heat		Semifinal		Final	
Athlete	Event	Time	Rank	Time	Rank	Time	Rank
Gabriel Araya	100 m freestyle	51.34	64	did not advance			
Gabriel Araya	200 m butterfly	2:01.63, NR	35	did not advance			
Jorge Depassier	50 m freestyle	24.29	82	did not advance			
Jorge Depassier	200 m freestyle	1:53.62	53	did not advance			

Women

Athlete	Event	Heat		Semifinal		Final	
Athlete	Event	Time	Rank	Time	Rank	Time	Rank
Kristel Köbrich	800 m freestyle	DNS		—		did not advance	
Kristel Köbrich	1500 m freestyle	16:16.26	12	—		did not advance	
