= Kai Edwards (swimmer) =

Australian swimmer

Personal information
- Full name: Kai Graeme Edwards
- Nationality: Australian
- Born: 13 September 1998 (age 28) Queensland, Australia
- Height: 184 cm (6 ft 0 in)
- Weight: 82 kg (181 lb)

Sport
- Sport: Swimming
- Strokes: marathon swimming, open water swimming
- Club: Carlile Swim Club

Kai Edwards (born 13 September 1998) is an Australian marathon swimmer.

== Career ==
Edwards competed at the 2019 World Aquatics Championships in the 10 km race, where he finished 14th, as well as in the marathon event in which he finished 5th overall in 4:51:17.20, only 11 seconds behind the overall winner.

He finished second at the Australian 10 km Championship on the Sunshine Coast in January 2021, which secured him a place at the final Olympic qualifying race in Setubal, Portugal and qualified from to compete in the marathon 10 kilometre race at the 2020 Summer Olympics.

== Personal life ==
He is from Carlile Swimming in Sydney. He studied Sport Studies at Griffith University on the Gold Coast and received the Full Blue Award from Griffith University in 2017, 2018 and 2019.
