= José Paulo Lopes =

Portuguese swimmer (born 2000)

Personal information
- Full name: José Paulo da Graça Antunes Lopes
- Nationality: Portuguese
- Born: 16 October 2000 (age 24); Braga, Portugal
- Height: 1.87 m (6 ft 2 in)
- Weight: 83 kg (183 lb)

Sport
- Sport: Swimming
- Club: S.C. Braga

José Paulo da Graça Antunes Lopes (born 16 October 2000) is a Portuguese freestyle and medley swimmer. He competed in the 2020 Summer Olympics.
