= S.L. Benfica (swimming) =

Benfica

Club information
- Full name: Sport Lisboa e Benfica
- City: Lisbon
- Founded: 1914
- Home pool: Estádio da Luz swimming pool complex

Sport Lisboa e Benfica (Portuguese pronunciation: [sɨˈpɔɾ liʒˈβoɐ i βɐ̃jˈfikɐ]), commonly known as Benfica, created a swimming section in 1914, which had one of the most successful teams in Portugal. Before the appearance of Diogo Ribeiro, Benfica's most notable swimmer had been Alexandre Yokochi, who competed for the club his entire career.

Apart from individual titles, Benfica have won nine Men's National Championships, one regional bracket of Men´s European Economic Community (EEC) Champions Clubs Cup and three Women's National Championship.

== Honours ==
=== Men's ===
- Portuguese Championship

Winners (9): 1986, 1988, 1989, 1992, 1993, 2022, 2023, 2024, 2025

- European Economic Community (EEC) Champions Clubs Cup

Winners: 1990 (regional bracket)

=== Women's ===
- Portuguese Championship

Winners (3): 1987, 2023, 2025
