= Victoria Kaminskaya =

Russian-born Portuguese swimmer (born 1995)

Personal information
- Nationality: Russian; Portuguese
- Born: 7 October 1995 (age 31) Bryansk, Russia
- Spouse: Miguel Nascimento

Sport
- Sport: Swimming
- Club: Benfica

Victoria Kaminskaya Nascimento (Russian: Виктория Каминская, born 7 October 1995) is a Russian-born Portuguese swimmer who competed in the women's 200 and 400 metre individual medley events at the 2016 Summer Olympics. On 4 May 2018 it was announced that the multiple Portuguese record holder would be representing Benfica.
