= Tamila Holub =

Portuguese swimmer

Personal information
- Full name: Tamila Hryhorivna Holub
- Nationality: Portuguese
- Born: 15 May 1999 (age 27) Cherkasy, Ukraine
- Height: 1.76 m (5 ft 9 in)
- Weight: 62 kg (137 lb)

Sport
- Sport: Swimming
- Strokes: Freestyle
- Club: S.C. Braga
- College team: NC State University
Medal record
Representing Portugal
European Junior Championships
Gold medal – first place	2016 Hódmezővásárhely	1500 m freestyle
Silver medal – second place	2016 Hódmezővásárhely	800 m freestyle

Tamila Hryhorivna Holub (Ukrainian: Таміла Григорівна Голуб; born 15 May 1999) is a Ukrainian-born Portuguese swimmer. She competed in the women's 800 metre freestyle event at the 2016 Summer Olympics. She began attending and swimming for NC State University in Fall 2017. She has qualified to represent Portugal at the 2020 Summer Olympics.

In 2019, she represented Portugal at the 2019 World Aquatics Championships held in Gwangju, South Korea. She competed in the women's 800 metre freestyle and women's 1500 metre freestyle events. In both events she did not advance to compete in the final. She also competed in the women's 4 × 200 metre freestyle relay event.
