= Diogo Ribeiro (swimmer) =

Portuguese swimmer (born 2004)

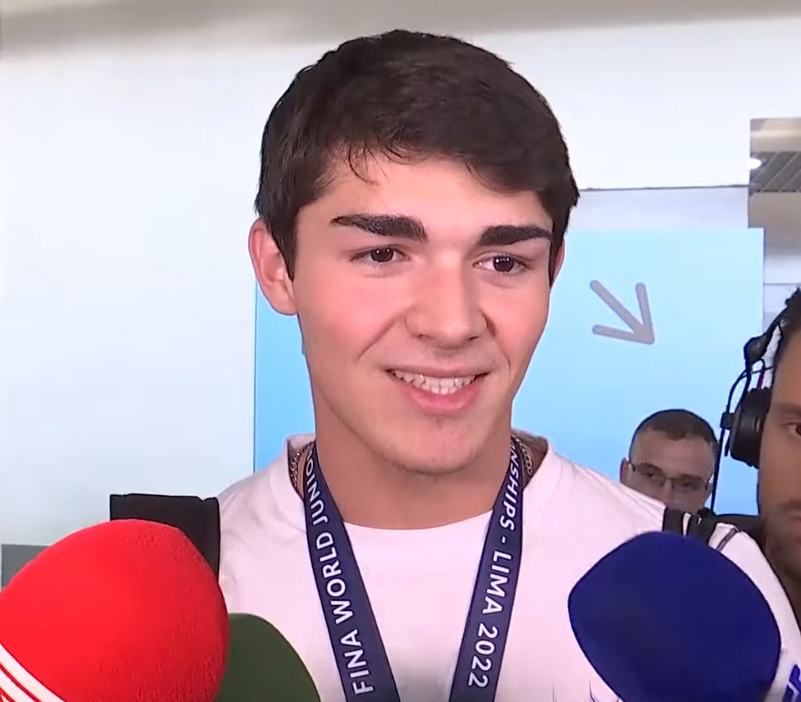
- Ribeiro in 2022

Personal information
- Full name: Diogo Matos Ribeiro
- Nationality: Portuguese
- Born: 27 October 2004 (age 21) Coimbra, Portugal
- Height: 1.84 m (6 ft 0 in)
- Weight: 67 kg (148 lb)

Sport
- Sport: Swimming
- Strokes: Butterfly, freestyle
- Club: Benfica
- Coach: André Vaz
Medal record
Men's swimming
Representing Portugal
World Championships (LC)
Gold medal – first place	2024 Doha	50 m butterfly
Gold medal – first place	2024 Doha	100 m butterfly
Silver medal – second place	2023 Fukuoka	50 m butterfly
European Championships (LC)
Bronze medal – third place	2022 Rome	50 m butterfly
Mediterranean Games
Gold medal – first place	2022 Oran	50 m butterfly
Silver medal – second place	2022 Oran	100 m freestyle
World Junior Championships
Gold medal – first place	2022 Lima	50 m freestyle
Gold medal – first place	2022 Lima	50 m butterfly
Gold medal – first place	2022 Lima	100 m butterfly
European U23 Championships
Gold medal – first place	2025 Samorin	50 m freestyle
Gold medal – first place	2025 Samorin	50 m butterfly
Silver medal – second place	2025 Samorin	100 m butterfly
European Junior Championships
Silver medal – second place	2021 Rome	100 m butterfly

Diogo Matos Ribeiro (European Portuguese pronunciation: [diˈoɣu ʁiˈβɐjɾu]; born 27 October 2004) is a Portuguese competitive swimmer who specializes in freestyle and butterfly events. He represents S.L. Benfica at the club level.

Ribeiro rose to prominence in Portuguese and world swimming after winning three gold medals and establishing a new junior world record in the long course 50-metre butterfly event at the 2022 World Junior Championships in Lima, Peru. The following year, competing in his first senior-level World Championships in Fukuoka, Japan, he claimed a silver medal in the 50 metres butterfly with a national record time to become the first Portuguese swimmer to win a World Championship medal. Ribeiro's biggest achievement came at the 2024 World Aquatics Championships in Doha, Qatar, where he won the 50-metre and 100-metre butterfly events and secured the first World Championship gold medals for Portuguese swimming at senior level.

== Career ==
In his hometown of Coimbra, he was a swimmer for the Beatriz Santos Foundation (FBS), the Clube Náutico Académico (CNAC) and União 1919. Diogo Ribeiro joined Lisbon-based S.L. Benfica in October 2021, renewing in 2022, in a contract that included the current Olympic cycle and the next one.

Ribeiro won the gold medal in the 50-metre butterfly event at the 2022 FINA World Junior Swimming Championships in Lima, Peru with a Championships and Portuguese record time of 22.96 seconds, which was 0.09 seconds faster than the former world junior record of 23.05 seconds set by Andrey Minakov of Russia in 2020. He also won the gold medal in the 100-metre butterfly, with a time of 52.03 seconds, and the gold medal in the 50-metre freestyle, with a time of 21.92 seconds.

At the 2023 World Aquatics Championships, he won the silver medal in the 50-metre butterfly event, thus becoming the first ever Portuguese medalist in senior world championships. He set a new Portuguese record with a time of 22.80 seconds.

Diogo Ribeiro became world champion in the 100-meter butterfly at the 2024 World Aquatics Championships in Doha, Qatar, repeating the title he won five days earlier in the 50-meter butterfly event.

== Achievements ==
=== Results in international championships ===
Long course (50-metre pool)
Meet	50 freestyle	100 freestyle	50 butterfly	100 butterfly	4×100 medley
EJC 2021	11th	5th	6th	2nd place, silver medalist(s)	
MG 2022	5th	2nd place, silver medalist(s)	1st place, gold medalist(s)	9th	5th
EC 2022	11th	9th	3rd place, bronze medalist(s)	8th	
WJC 2022	1st place, gold medalist(s)	1st (h)^{[a]}	1st place, gold medalist(s)	1st place, gold medalist(s)	
WC 2023	13th	10th	2nd place, silver medalist(s)	13th	16th
WC 2024	18th	11th	1st place, gold medalist(s)	1st place, gold medalist(s)	10th

^{a} Ribeiro withdrew after qualifying for the semifinal.

Short course (25-metre pool)
Meet	100 freestyle	50 butterfly	100 butterfly	4×50 medley
EC 2023	7th	9th	9th	5th

=== Personal best times ===
Long course (50-metre pool)
Event	Time	Meet	Location	Date	Notes	Ref
50 m freestyle	21.87	2023 Portuguese National Championships	Funchal, Portugal	30 March 2023	NR (h)	
100 m freestyle	47.98	2023 Portuguese National Championships	Funchal, Portugal	31 March 2023	NR	
200 m freestyle	1:48.98	2023 Portuguese National Club Championships	Oeiras, Portugal	7 April 2023		
400 m freestyle	4:06.88	2022 Portuguese National Club Championships	Oeiras, Portugal	9 April 2022		
50 m backstroke	27.00	"Rumo a Tóquio 2021" Meet	Coimbra, Portugal	27 March 2021		
100 m backstroke	59.54	13th Coimbra Meet	Coimbra, Portugal	24 April 2021		
200 m backstroke	2:21.03	3rd Latvian Junior and Youth Championship	Riga, Latvia	4 May 2019		
50 m breaststroke	31.73	13th Coimbra Meet	Coimbra, Portugal	24 April 2021		
50 m butterfly	22.80	2023 World Aquatics Championships	Fukuoka, Japan	24 July 2023	NR	
100 m butterfly	51.17	2024 World Aquatics Championships	Doha, Qatar	17 February 2024	NR	
200 m butterfly	2:08.38	2019 Portuguese Junior National Championships	Coimbra, Portugal	4 April 2019		
200 m individual medley	2:11.46	"Rumo a Tóquio 2021" Meet	Coimbra, Portugal	28 March 2021		
400 m individual medley	4:48.79	2019 Portuguese Junior National Championships	Coimbra, Portugal	5 April 2019		
4×100 m freestyle relay	3:20.92	2023 Portuguese National Club Championships	Oeiras, Portugal	6 April 2023	NR	
4×200 m freestyle relay	7:38.79	2023 Portuguese National Club Championships	Oeiras, Portugal	7 April 2023		
4×100 m medley relay	3:35.63	2023 World Aquatics Championships	Fukuoka, Japan	30 July 2023	NR (h)	

Legend: NR – Portuguese record;
Records not set in finals: h – heat; sf – semifinal; r – relay 1st leg; rh – relay heat 1st leg; b – B final; † – en route to final mark; so – swim-off; tt – time trial

Short course (25-metre pool)
Event	Time	Meet	Location	Date	Notes	Ref
50 m freestyle	21.87	8th International Algarve Meeting	Albufeira, Portugal	13 November 2022		
100 m freestyle	46.61	2023 European Short Course Championships	Otopeni, Romania	10 December 2023	NR	
50 m backstroke	27.08	Vale do Sousa Open	Felgueiras, Portugal	28 April 2019		
50 m butterfly	22.71	2023 European Short Course Championships	Otopeni, Romania	8 December 2023	NR	
100 m butterfly	51.00	2023 Portuguese National Club Championships	Felgueiras, Portugal	22 December 2023	NR	
200 m butterfly	2:06.17	Vale do Sousa Open	Felgueiras, Portugal	27 April 2019		
200 m individual medley	2:09.69	Vale do Sousa Open	Felgueiras, Portugal	28 April 2019		
4×50 m freestyle relay	1:40.36	Vale do Sousa Open	Felgueiras, Portugal	27 April 2019		
4×50 m medley relay	1:33.82	2023 European Short Course Championships	Otopeni, Romania	6 December 2023		

Legend: NR – Portuguese record;
Records not set in finals: h – heat; sf – semifinal; r – relay 1st leg; rh – relay heat 1st leg; b – B final; † – en route to final mark; so – swim-off; tt – time trial

=== Records ===
Below are listed Ribeiro's sanctioned record times obtained at world, continental and other relevant international competitions.

Long course (50-metre pool)
No.	Event	Time	Meet	Location	Date	Type	Status	Ref
1	50 m butterfly	23.38	2022 Mediterranean Games	Oran, Algeria	1 July 2022	CR	Current	
2	50 m butterfly	22.96	2022 World Junior Championships	Lima, Peru	3 September 2022	WJR, CR	Current	

Legend: WJR – World junior record; CR – Competition record;
Records not set in finals: h – heat; sf – semifinal; r – relay 1st leg; rh – relay heat 1st leg; b – B final; † – en route to final mark; so – swim-off; tt – time trial

== Personal life ==
Diogo Ribeiro lost his father when he was 4 years old and got into the habit, in his own words, "of talking to him a lot at night." When he was 16, he had a motorbike accident in Coimbra that left him with a broken index finger, part of which he lost, and excruciating pain all over his body. Before he made a full recovery, he spent a week in hospital and a month in bed at home. Then he started physiotherapy, but for a while he still had to use a wheelchair when he went to the toilet.
