= Portuguese Swimming Federation =

Sports governing body in Portugal

LEN
- Founded: 19 August 1930
- FINA affiliation: 1930
- LEN affiliation: 1930
- Website: "Federação Portuguesa de Natação". fpnatacao.pt.
- President: António da Silva

The Portuguese Swimming Federation (Portuguese: Federação Portuguesa de Natação is the national sports federation tasked with the development, promotion and international representation of swimming in Portugal. The federation overlooks several other sports including competition swimming, open water swimming, water polo, diving and synchronized swimming. The federation is based in Lisbon and Porto. It is a member of the Olympic Committee of Portugal, and represents roughly 11,000 members.
