= Miguel Nascimento =

Portuguese swimmer (born 1995)

Personal information
- Full name: Miguel de Almeida Silva Duarte Nascimento
- Born: 19 January 1995 (age 31) Portimao, Portugal
- Height: 185 cm (6 ft 1 in)
- Spouse: Victoria Kaminskaya

Sport
- Sport: Swimming
- Club: Benfica
Medal record
Men's swimming
Representing Portugal
Mediterranean Games
| Silver medal – second place | 2022 Oran | 50 m freestyle |

Miguel de Almeida Silva Duarte Nascimento (born 19 January 1995) is a Portuguese swimmer. He competed in the men's 100 metre freestyle event at the 2017 World Aquatics Championships. At club level, he competes for Benfica. As of 3 August 2018, he holds the national record in the 400 metres freestyle, with a mark of 3:51.89.
