= Diana Durães =

Portuguese swimmer (born 1996)

Personal information
- Full name: Diana Margarida Coelho Durães
- Nationality: Portuguese
- Born: 8 June 1996 (age 30) Fafe, Portugal
- Height: 1.70 m (5 ft 7 in)
- Weight: 62 kg (137 lb)

Sport
- Sport: Swimming
- Club: Benfica
Medal record
Representing Portugal
Women's swimming
Mediterranean Games
Bronze medal – third place	2018 Tarragona	400 m freestyle

Diana Margarida Coelho Durães (born 8 June 1996) is a Portuguese swimmer who holds national records in the 200, 400, 800, 1500 and 5000 metres freestyle. She competed in the women's 200 metre freestyle event at the 2017 World Aquatics Championships. At club level, she represents S.L. Benfica.
