= Tiago Campos (swimmer) =

Portuguese swimmer (born 1999)

Personal information
- Full name: Tiago Filipe Carvalho de Campos
- Born: 16 March 1999 (age 26) Santarém, Portugal
- Height: 1.80 m (5 ft 11 in)
- Weight: 80 kg (176 lb)

Sport
- Country: Portugal
- Sport: Swimming
- Event: Marathon swimming

Tiago Filipe Carvalho de Campos (born 16 March 1999) is a Portuguese marathon swimmer. He competed in the 2020 Summer Olympics.
