= Portugal at the 2011 World Aquatics Championships =

Sporting event delegation

Flag of Portugal

Portugal competed at the 2011 World Aquatics Championships in Shanghai, China between July 16 and 31, 2011.

== Open water swimming ==
Men

Athlete	Event	Final	
Athlete	Event	Time	Position
Arseniy Lavrentyev	Men's 10km	2:03:51.9	47

== Swimming ==
Portugal qualified 7 swimmers.

Men

Athlete	Event	Heats		Semifinals		Final	
Athlete	Event	Time	Rank	Time	Rank	Time	Rank
Alexandre Agostinho	Men's 50m Freestyle	22.81	32	did not advance			
Alexandre Agostinho	Men's 100m Freestyle	50.71	45	did not advance			
Carlos Almeida	Men's 100m Breaststroke	1:02.13	42	did not advance			
Carlos Almeida	Men's 200m Breaststroke	2:14.86	29	did not advance			
Simao Morgado	Men's 100m Butterfly	53.01	22	did not advance			
Duarte Mourao	Men's 200m Butterfly	1:59.81	28	did not advance			
Diogo Carvalho	Men's 200m individual medley	1:59.51	9 Q	1:59.84	12	did not advance	
Diogo Carvalho	Men's 400m IM	4:18.68	14			did not advance	

Women

Athlete	Event	Heats		Semifinals		Final	
Athlete	Event	Time	Rank	Time	Rank	Time	Rank
Sara Oliveira	Women's 50m Butterfly	27.75	30	did not advance			
Sara Oliveira	Women's 100m Butterfly	59.93	32	did not advance			
Sara Oliveira	Women's 200m Butterfly	2:11.37	24	did not advance			
Nadia Vieira	Women's 200m IM	2:19.74	28	did not advance			
Nadia Vieira	Women's 400m IM	4:51.65	28			did not advance	
