= Japan at the 2023 World Aquatics Championships =

- Flag of Japan
- World Aquatics code: JPN
- National federation: Japan Swimming Federation
- Website: swim.or.jp (in Japanese)

in Fukuoka, Japan
- Competitors: 102 in 6 sports
- Medals Ranked 4th: Gold 4 Silver 1 Bronze 5 Total 10

World Aquatics Championships appearances
- 1973; 1975; 1978; 1982; 1986; 1991; 1994; 1998; 2001; 2003; 2005; 2007; 2009; 2011; 2013; 2015; 2017; 2019; 2022; 2023; 2024; 2025

Japan competed at the 2023 World Aquatics Championships in Fukuoka, Japan from 14 to 30 July.

== Medalists ==
| Medal | Name | Sport | Event | Date |
|---|---|---|---|---|
| Gold | Yukiko Inui | Artistic swimming | Women's solo technical routine | July 15 |
| Gold | Tomoka Sato; Yotaro Sato | Artistic swimming | Mixed duet technical routine | July 16 |
| Gold | Moe Higa; Mashiro Yasunaga | Artistic swimming | Women's duet technical routine | July 16 |
| Gold | Yukiko Inui | Artistic swimming | Women's solo free routine | July 19 |
| Silver | Moe Higa; Moeka Kijima; Uta Kobayashi; Ayano Shimada; Ami Wada; Akane Yanagisawa; Mashiro Yasunaga; Megumu Yoshida | Artistic swimming | Team free routine | July 21 |
| Bronze | Hiroki Ito; Minami Itahashi | Diving | Mixed synchronized 10 metre platform | July 15 |
| Bronze | Moka Fujii; Hikari Suzuki; Yotaro Sato; Akane Yanagisawa; Ikoi Hirota; Megumu Yoshida; Tomoka Sato; Moeka Kijima | Artistic swimming | Team acrobatic routine | July 17 |
| Bronze | Moe Higa; Mashiro Yasunaga | Artistic swimming | Women's duet free routine | July 20 |
| Bronze | Daiya Seto | Swimming | Men's 400 m individual medley | July 23 |
| Bronze | Tomoru Honda | Swimming | Men's 200 m butterfly | July 26 |

Medals by sport
| Sport | 1st place, gold medalist(s) | 2nd place, silver medalist(s) | 3rd place, bronze medalist(s) | Total |
| Artistic swimming | 4 | 1 | 2 | 7 |
| Diving | 0 | 0 | 1 | 1 |
| Swimming | 0 | 0 | 2 | 2 |

== Athletes by discipline ==
The following is the list of number of competitors participating at the Championships per discipline.

| Sport | Men | Women | Total |
|---|---|---|---|
| Artistic swimming | 1 | 13 | 14 |
| Diving | 5 | 4 | 9 |
| High diving | 1 | 0 | 1 |
| Open water swimming | 4 | 4 | 8 |
| Swimming | 20 | 20 | 40 |
| Water polo | 15 | 15 | 30 |
| Total | 46 | 56 | 102 |

== Artistic swimming ==
Men

| Athlete | Event | Preliminaries | | Final | |
| Athlete | Event | Points | Rank | Points | Rank |
|---|---|---|---|---|---|
| Yotaro Sato | Solo free routine | 167.7478 | 5 Q | 167.9709 | 4 |

Women

| Athlete | Event | Preliminaries | | Final | |
| Athlete | Event | Points | Rank | Points | Rank |
|---|---|---|---|---|---|
| Yukiko Inui | Solo technical routine | 273.2700 | 1 Q | 276.5717 | 1st place, gold medalist(s) |
| Yukiko Inui | Solo free routine | 253.1853 | 1 Q | 254.6062 | 1st place, gold medalist(s) |
| Moe Higa; Mashiro Yasunaga | Duet technical routine | 215.2700 | 12 Q | 273.9500 | 1st place, gold medalist(s) |
| Moe Higa; Mashiro Yasunaga | Duet free routine | 178.1583 | 11 Q | 249.5167 | 3rd place, bronze medalist(s) |

Mixed

| Athlete | Event | Preliminaries | | Final | |
| Athlete | Event | Points | Rank | Points | Rank |
|---|---|---|---|---|---|
| Tomoka Sato; Yotaro Sato | Duet technical routine | 227.7200 | 3 Q | 255.5066 | 1st place, gold medalist(s) |
| Tomoka Sato; Yotaro Sato | Duet free routine | Did not start | | | |
| Moka Fujii; Ikoi Hirota; Moeka Kijima; Tomoka Sato; Yotaro Sato; Hikari Suzuki; Akane Yanagisawa; Megumu Yoshida | Team acrobatic routine | 224.5167 | 4 Q | 220.5867 | 3rd place, bronze medalist(s) |
| Moe Higa; Moeka Kijima; Tomoka Sato; Ayano Shimada; Ami Wada; Akane Yanagisawa; Mashiro Yasunaga; Megumu Yoshida | Team technical routine | 235.2972 | 7 Q | 260.1055 | 4 |
| Moe Higa; Moeka Kijima; Uta Kobayashi; Ayano Shimada; Ami Wada; Akane Yanagisawa; Mashiro Yasunaga; Megumu Yoshida | Team free routine | 293.4522 | 3 Q | 317.8085 | 2nd place, silver medalist(s) |

== Diving ==
Japan entered 9 divers.

Men

| Athlete | Event | Preliminaries | | Semifinals | | Final | |
| Athlete | Event | Points | Rank | Points | Rank | Points | Rank |
|---|---|---|---|---|---|---|---|
| Shu Ohkubo | 10 m platform | 336.65 | 29 | Did not advance | | | |
| Rikuto Tamai | 1 m springboard | 298.60 | 31 | —N/a | | Did not advance | |
| Rikuto Tamai | 10 m platform | 404.50 | 12 Q | 427.70 | 7 Q | Withdrew | |
| Haruki Suyama | 3 m springboard | 365.60 | 24 | Did not advance | | | |
| Yuto Araki; Haruki Suyama | 3 m synchro springboard | 359.04 | 8 Q | —N/a | | 375.90 | 7 |

Women

| Athlete | Event | Preliminaries | | Semifinals | | Final | |
| Athlete | Event | Points | Rank | Points | Rank | Points | Rank |
|---|---|---|---|---|---|---|---|
| Matsuri Arai | 10 m platform | 314.10 | 7 Q | 313.95 | 7 Q | 288.85 | 11 |
| Haruka Enomoto | 3 m springboard | 232.80 | 34 | Did not advance | | | |
| Sayaka Mikami | 3 m springboard | 316.05 | 2 Q | 340.55 | 3 Q | 305.25 | 7 |
| Matsuri Arai; Minami Itahashi | 10 m synchro platform | 289.32 | 6 Q | —N/a | | 284.76 | 5 |

Mixed

| Athlete | Event | Final | |
| Athlete | Event | Points | Rank |
|---|---|---|---|
| Hiroki Ito; Minami Itahashi | 10 m synchro platform | 305.34 | 3rd place, bronze medalist(s) |

== High diving ==
| Athlete | Event | Points | Rank |
|---|---|---|---|
| Kyohei Arata | Men's high diving | 222.65 | 20 |

== Open water swimming ==
Japan entered 8 open water swimmers.

Men

| Athlete | Event | Time | Rank |
|---|---|---|---|
| Riku Ezawa | Men's 5 km | 59:40.6 | 40 |
| Kaiki Furuhata | Men's 10 km | 1:54:07.7 | 22 |
| Taishin Minamide | Men's 10 km | 1:54:12.6 | 28 |
| Kaito Tsujimori | Men's 5 km | 58:17.2 | 37 |

Women

| Athlete | Event | Time | Rank |
|---|---|---|---|
| Airi Ebina | Women's 10 km | 2:05:08.4 | 28 |
| Ichika Kajimoto | Women's 5 km | 1:00:56.4 | 14 |
| Hanano Kato | Women's 10 km | 2:07:26.4 | 33 |
| Miku Kojima | Women's 5 km | 1:02:28.8 | 35 |

Mixed

| Athlete | Event | Time | Rank |
|---|---|---|---|
| Airi Ebina; Kaiki Furuhata; Ichika Kajimoto; Kaito Tsujimori | Team relay | 1:13:38.5 | 7 |

== Swimming ==
Japan entered 39 swimmers.

Men

| Athlete | Event | Heat | | Semifinal | | Final | |
| Athlete | Event | Time | Rank | Time | Rank | Time | Rank |
|---|---|---|---|---|---|---|---|
| Yuya Hinomoto | 50 m breaststroke | 27.35 | 15 Q | 27.25 | 11 | Did not advance | |
| Tomoru Honda | 200 m butterfly | 1:54.21 | 1 Q | 1:54.43 | 5 Q | 1:53.66 | 3rd place, bronze medalist(s) |
| Tomoru Honda | 400 m individual medley | 4:16.71 | 14 | —N/a | | Did not advance | |
| Ryosuke Irie | 50 m backstroke | 25.11 | 16 Q | 25.21 | 15 | Did not advance | |
| Ryosuke Irie | 100 m backstroke | 53.98 | 18 | Did not advance | | | |
| Takeshi Kawamoto | 50 m backstroke | 25.05 | 13 Q | 25.14 | 14 | Did not advance | |
| Takeshi Kawamoto | 50 m butterfly | 23.79 | 35 | Did not advance | | | |
| Katsuhiro Matsumoto | 100 m freestyle | 48.58 | 21 | Did not advance | | | |
| Katsuhiro Matsumoto | 200 m freestyle | 1:46.44 | 8 Q | 1:45.97; 1:46.37 | 8 SO; 2 | Did not advance | |
| Katsuhiro Matsumoto | 100 m butterfly | 51.48 | 10 Q | 51.16 | 7 Q | 51.20 | 6 |
| Naoki Mizunuma | 50 m butterfly | 23.75 | 33 | Did not advance | | | |
| Naoki Mizunuma | 100 m butterfly | 51.93 | 19 | Did not advance | | | |
| Teppei Morimoto | 200 m butterfly | 1:55.72 | 10 Q | 1:55.36 | 10 | Did not advance | |
| Katsumi Nakamura | 50 m freestyle | 22.21 | 27 | Did not advance | | | |
| So Ogata | 200 m individual medley | 1:57.88 | 3 Q | 1:57.06 | 5 Q | 1:57.82 | 8 |
| Shoma Sato | 200 m breaststroke | 2:11.03 | 15 Q | 2:10.72 | 14 | Did not advance | |
| Daiya Seto | 200 m individual medley | 1:57.80 | 2 Q | 1:57.15 | 6 Q | 1:56.70 | 6 |
| Daiya Seto | 400 m individual medley | 4:10.89 | 3 Q | —N/a | | 4:09.41 | 3rd place, bronze medalist(s) |
| Shinri Shioura | 50 m freestyle | 22.15 | 23 | Did not advance | | | |
| Hidekazu Takehara | 200 m backstroke | 1:58.46 | 16 Q | 1:58.10 | 14 | Did not advance | |
| Ippei Watanabe | 100 m breaststroke | 1:00.28 | 17 | Did not advance | | | |
| Ippei Watanabe | 200 m breaststroke | 2:10.11 | 8 Q | 2:09.50 | 8 Q | 2:08.78 | 6 |
| Daiki Yanagawa | 200 m backstroke | 1:58.14 | 13 Q | 1:57.23 | 7 Q | 1:58.75 | 8 |
| Katsuhiro Matsumoto; Masahiro Kawane; Tomonobu Gomi; Katsumi Nakamura | 4 × 100 m freestyle relay | 3:14.84 | 13 | —N/a | | Did not advance | |
| Hidenari Mano; Katsuhiro Matsumoto; Taikan Tanaka; Fuyu Yoshida | 4 × 200 m freestyle relay | 7:08.70 | 9 | —N/a | | Did not advance | |
| Ryosuke Irie; Ippei Watanabe; Naoki Mizunuma; Katsuhiro Matsumoto | 4 × 100 m medley relay | 3:32.36 | 7 Q | —N/a | | 3:32.58 | 6 |

Women

| Athlete | Event | Heat | | Semifinal | | Final | |
| Athlete | Event | Time | Rank | Time | Rank | Time | Rank |
|---|---|---|---|---|---|---|---|
| Reona Aoki | 100 m breaststroke | 1:06.61 | 10 Q | 1:06.32 | 9 | Did not advance | |
| Hanane Hironaka | 200 m backstroke | 2:12.57 | 17 | Did not advance | | | |
| Rikako Ikee | 50 m freestyle | 25.27 | 20 | Did not advance | | | |
| Rikako Ikee | 100 m freestyle | 54.67 | 16 Q | 54.86 | 15 | Did not advance | |
| Rikako Ikee | 50 m butterfly | 25.50 | 3 Q | 25.72 | 5 Q | 25.78 | 7 |
| Rikako Ikee | 100 m butterfly | 58.61 | 17 | Did not advance | | | |
| Nagisa Ikemoto | 200 m freestyle | 1:59.23 | 22 | Did not advance | | | |
| Runa Imai | 200 m breaststroke | 2:25.27 | 8 Q | 2:24.68 | 9 | Did not advance | |
| Waka Kobori | 400 m freestyle | 4:07.48 | 10 | —N/a | | Did not advance | |
| Waka Kobori | 800 m freestyle | 8:29.54 | 11 | —N/a | | Did not advance | |
| Hiroko Makino | 200 m butterfly | 2:09.03 | 8 Q | 2:08.40 | 9 | Did not advance | |
| Airi Mitsui | 200 m butterfly | 2:08.54 | 6 Q | 2:07.51 | 7 Q | 2:07.15 | 5 |
| Yukimi Moriyama | 1500 m freestyle | 16:18.66 | 13 | —N/a | | Did not advance | |
| Miyu Namba | 400 m freestyle | 4:10.23 | 16 | —N/a | | Did not advance | |
| Miyu Namba | 800 m freestyle | 8:34.62 | 16 | —N/a | | Did not advance | |
| Mio Narita | 200 m individual medley | 2:11.69 | 15 Q | 2:12.24 | 12 | Did not advance | |
| Mio Narita | 400 m individual medley | 4:38.05 | 3 Q | —N/a | | 4:42.14 | 8 |
| Yui Ohashi | 200 m individual medley | 2:10.80 | 9 Q | 2:10.32 | 5 Q | 2:11.27 | 6 |
| Rio Shirai | 100 m backstroke | 1:00.83 | 19 | Did not advance | | | |
| Rio Shirai | 200 m backstroke | 2:11.24 | 13 Q | 2:12.45 | 14 | Did not advance | |
| Ai Soma | 50 m butterfly | 25.96 | 8 Q | 26.18 | 15 | Did not advance | |
| Ai Soma | 100 m butterfly | 58.17 | 13 Q | 58.27 | 14 | Did not advance | |
| Satomi Suzuki | 50 m breaststroke | 30.29 | 5 Q | 30.33 | 8 Q | 30.44 | 7 |
| Satomi Suzuki | 100 m breaststroke | 1:06.20 | 5 Q | 1:06.31 | 8 Q | 1:06.67 | 8 |
| Miki Takahashi | 50 m backstroke | 27.84 | 7 Q | 28.13 | 14 | Did not advance | |
| Ageha Tanigawa | 400 m individual medley | 4:40.21 | 9 | —N/a | | Did not advance | |
| Rikako Ikee; Nagisa Ikemoto; Yume Jinno; Rio Shirai | 4 × 100 m freestyle relay | 3:37.71 | 8 Q | —N/a | | 3:38.61 | 8 |
| Rio Shirai; Nagisa Ikemoto; Chihiro Igarashi; Kinuko Mochizuki | 4 × 200 m freestyle relay | 7:57.22 | 9 | —N/a | | Did not advance | |
| Rio Shirai; Satomi Suzuki; Ai Soma; Rikako Ikee; Reona Aoki | 4 × 100 m medley relay | 3:58.58 | 8 Q | —N/a | | 3:58.02 | 6 |

Mixed

| Athlete | Event | Heat | | Final | |
| Athlete | Event | Time | Rank | Time | Rank |
|---|---|---|---|---|---|
| Tomonobu Gomi; Katsumi Nakamura; Nagisa Ikemoto; Yume Jinno | 4 × 100 m freestyle relay | 3:26.47 | 6 Q | 3:26.96 | 7 |
| Ryosuke Irie; Ippei Watanabe; Ai Soma; Rikako Ikee | 4 × 100 m medley relay | 3:44.79 | 7 Q | 3:45.33 | 7 |

== Water polo ==
Summary

| Team | Event | Group stage | | | | Playoff | Quarterfinal | Semifinal | Final / BM | |
| Team | Event | Opposition Score | Opposition Score | Opposition Score | Rank | Opposition Score | Opposition Score | Opposition Score | Opposition Score | Rank |
|---|---|---|---|---|---|---|---|---|---|---|
| Japan | Men's tournament | Hungary; L 8–16 | Argentina; W 20–9 | Croatia; L 12–17 | 3 QP | Serbia; L 10–16 | —N/a | Australia; L 15–16 | Canada; W 23–11 | 11 |
| Japan | Women's tournament | New Zealand; L 16–17 | Hungary; L 21–26 | Canada; L 12–17 | 4 | —N/a | —N/a | Argentina; W 21–11 | China; L 10–18 | 14 |

=== Men's tournament ===
Team roster

The following is the Japanese roster.

Head coach: Yoshinori Shiota

- 1 Katsuyuki Tanamura GK
- 2 Seiya Adachi FP
- 3 Taiyo Watanabe FP
- 4 Daichi Ogihara FP
- 5 Ikkei Nitta FP
- 6 Toi Suzuki FP
- 7 Kiyomu Date FP
- 8 Mitsuru Takata FP
- 9 Atsushi Arai FP
- 10 Yusuke Inaba FP
- 11 Keigo Okawa FP
- 12 Kenta Araki FP
- 13 Towa Nishimura GK
- Masayuki Yamamoto FP
- Ren Sasano FP

Group play

| Pos | Team | Pld | W | PSW | PSL | L | GF | GA | GD | Pts | Qualification |
|---|---|---|---|---|---|---|---|---|---|---|---|
| 1 | Hungary | 3 | 3 | 0 | 0 | 0 | 49 | 31 | +18 | 9 | Quarterfinals |
| 2 | Croatia | 3 | 2 | 0 | 0 | 1 | 51 | 29 | +22 | 6 | Playoffs |
| 3 | Japan (H) | 3 | 1 | 0 | 0 | 2 | 40 | 42 | −2 | 3 | Playoffs |
| 4 | Argentina | 3 | 0 | 0 | 0 | 3 | 27 | 65 | −38 | 0 | |

Source: Sportresult
Rules for classification: 1) points; 2) head-to-head points; 3) head-to-head goal difference; 4) head-to-head number of goals scored; 5) Goal difference.
(H) Host

| 17 July 2023; 19:00 | Report | Hungary | 16–8 | Japan | Marine Messe Fukuoka, Fukuoka; Referees: Zhang Liang (CHN), Nicola Johnson (AUS) |
| 17 July 2023; 19:00 | Report | Score by quarters: 4–4, 3–2, 3–1, 6–1 | | | Marine Messe Fukuoka, Fukuoka; Referees: Zhang Liang (CHN), Nicola Johnson (AUS) |
| 17 July 2023; 19:00 | Report | Jansik, Zalánki 4 | Goals | Suzuki, Takata 2 | Marine Messe Fukuoka, Fukuoka; Referees: Zhang Liang (CHN), Nicola Johnson (AUS) |

| 19 July 2023; 19:00 | Report | Japan | 20–9 | Argentina | Marine Messe Fukuoka, Fukuoka; Referees: Zhang Liang (CHN), Darren Spiritsanto (USA) |
| 19 July 2023; 19:00 | Report | Score by quarters: 6–1, 4–2, 4–2, 6–4 | | | Marine Messe Fukuoka, Fukuoka; Referees: Zhang Liang (CHN), Darren Spiritsanto (USA) |
| 19 July 2023; 19:00 | Report | Watanabe 5 | Goals | Martino 3 | Marine Messe Fukuoka, Fukuoka; Referees: Zhang Liang (CHN), Darren Spiritsanto (USA) |

| 21 July 2023; 19:00 | Report | Croatia | 17–12 | Japan | Marine Messe Fukuoka, Fukuoka; Referees: Georgios Stavridis (GRE), Michiel Zwartt (NED) |
| 21 July 2023; 19:00 | Report | Score by quarters: 4–3, 3–3, 8–3, 2–3 | | | Marine Messe Fukuoka, Fukuoka; Referees: Georgios Stavridis (GRE), Michiel Zwartt (NED) |
| 21 July 2023; 19:00 | Report | Kharkov 4 | Goals | Adachi 4 | Marine Messe Fukuoka, Fukuoka; Referees: Georgios Stavridis (GRE), Michiel Zwartt (NED) |

Playoffs

| 23 July 2023; 18:30 | Report | Japan | 10–16 | Serbia | Marine Messe Fukuoka, Fukuoka; Referees: Tamás Kovács-Csatlós (HUN), Veselin Mišković (MNE) |
| 23 July 2023; 18:30 | Report | Score by quarters: 3–3, 2–3, 2–7, 3–3 | | | Marine Messe Fukuoka, Fukuoka; Referees: Tamás Kovács-Csatlós (HUN), Veselin Mišković (MNE) |
| 23 July 2023; 18:30 | Report | Inaba 4 | Goals | Radulović, Rašović 3 | Marine Messe Fukuoka, Fukuoka; Referees: Tamás Kovács-Csatlós (HUN), Veselin Mišković (MNE) |

9–12th place semifinals

| 25 July 2023; 13:30 | Report | Australia | 16–15 | Japan | Marine Messe Fukuoka, Fukuoka; Referees: David Gómez (ESP), Darren Spiritsanto (USA) |
| 25 July 2023; 13:30 | Report | Score by quarters: 5–3, 4–7, 4–3, 3–2 | | | Marine Messe Fukuoka, Fukuoka; Referees: David Gómez (ESP), Darren Spiritsanto (USA) |
| 25 July 2023; 13:30 | Report | Pavillard 4 | Goals | Adachi, Takata 4 | Marine Messe Fukuoka, Fukuoka; Referees: David Gómez (ESP), Darren Spiritsanto (USA) |

Eleventh place game

| 27 July 2023; 09:00 | Report | Canada | 11–23 | Japan | Marine Messe Fukuoka, Fukuoka; Referees: Vojin Putniković (SRB), Darren Spiritosanto (USA) |
| 27 July 2023; 09:00 | Report | Score by quarters: 3–6, 3–6, 2–8, 3–3 | | | Marine Messe Fukuoka, Fukuoka; Referees: Vojin Putniković (SRB), Darren Spiritosanto (USA) |
| 27 July 2023; 09:00 | Report | Djerkovic 3 | Goals | Inaba 5 | Marine Messe Fukuoka, Fukuoka; Referees: Vojin Putniković (SRB), Darren Spiritosanto (USA) |

=== Women's tournament ===
Team roster

The following is the Japanese roster.

Head coach: Yoji Omoto

- 1 Minami Shioya GK
- 2 Yumi Arima FP
- 3 Akari Inaba FP
- 4 Eruna Ura FP
- 5 Kako Kawaguchi FP
- 6 Hikaru Shitara FP
- 7 Ai Sunabe FP
- 8 Eri Kitamura FP
- 9 Yuka Yamai FP
- 10 Fuka Nishiyama FP
- 11 Momoe Inoue FP
- 12 Kyoko Kudo FP
- 13 Yuka Kawatashiro GK
- Manami Noda FP
- Kiyoka Goto FP

Group play

| Pos | Team | Pld | W | PSW | PSL | L | GF | GA | GD | Pts | Qualification |
|---|---|---|---|---|---|---|---|---|---|---|---|
| 1 | Hungary | 3 | 3 | 0 | 0 | 0 | 60 | 36 | +24 | 9 | Quarterfinals |
| 2 | Canada | 3 | 2 | 0 | 0 | 1 | 40 | 34 | +6 | 6 | Playoffs |
| 3 | New Zealand | 3 | 1 | 0 | 0 | 2 | 33 | 52 | −19 | 3 | Playoffs |
| 4 | Japan (H) | 3 | 0 | 0 | 0 | 3 | 49 | 60 | −11 | 0 | |

Source: Sportresult
Rules for classification: 1) points; 2) head-to-head points; 3) head-to-head goal difference; 4) head-to-head number of goals scored; 5) Goal difference.
(H) Host

| 16 July 2023; 19:00 | Report | New Zealand | 17–16 | Japan | Marine Messe Fukuoka, Fukuoka; Referees: Jennifer McCall (USA), Matan Schwartz (ISR) |
| 16 July 2023; 19:00 | Report | Score by quarters: 5–5, 4–3, 4–5, 4–3 | | | Marine Messe Fukuoka, Fukuoka; Referees: Jennifer McCall (USA), Matan Schwartz (ISR) |
| 16 July 2023; 19:00 | Report | Doyle 5 | Goals | Ura 5 | Marine Messe Fukuoka, Fukuoka; Referees: Jennifer McCall (USA), Matan Schwartz (ISR) |

| 18 July 2023; 19:00 | Report | Japan | 21–26 | Hungary | Marine Messe Fukuoka, Fukuoka; Referees: Matan Schwartz (ISR), Frank Ohme (GER) |
| 18 July 2023; 19:00 | Report | Score by quarters: 4–5, 6–8, 5–7, 6–6 | | | Marine Messe Fukuoka, Fukuoka; Referees: Matan Schwartz (ISR), Frank Ohme (GER) |
| 18 July 2023; 19:00 | Report | Arima 7 | Goals | Hajdú 5 | Marine Messe Fukuoka, Fukuoka; Referees: Matan Schwartz (ISR), Frank Ohme (GER) |

| 20 July 2023; 19:00 | Report | Canada | 17–12 | Japan | Marine Messe Fukuoka, Fukuoka; Referees: Adil Aimbetov (KAZ), Nicola Johnson (AUS) |
| 20 July 2023; 19:00 | Report | Score by quarters: 5–1, 3–3, 5–4, 4–4 | | | Marine Messe Fukuoka, Fukuoka; Referees: Adil Aimbetov (KAZ), Nicola Johnson (AUS) |
| 20 July 2023; 19:00 | Report | Lemay-Lavoie 5 | Goals | Arima, Kawaguchi 4 | Marine Messe Fukuoka, Fukuoka; Referees: Adil Aimbetov (KAZ), Nicola Johnson (AUS) |

13–16th place semifinals

| 22 July 2023; 10:30 | Report | Argentina | 11–21 | Japan | Marine Messe Fukuoka, Fukuoka; Referees: Alessia Ferrari (ITA), Lee-Anne Stewart (RSA) |
| 22 July 2023; 10:30 | Report | Score by quarters: 0–8, 3–4, 5–4, 3–5 | | | Marine Messe Fukuoka, Fukuoka; Referees: Alessia Ferrari (ITA), Lee-Anne Stewart (RSA) |
| 22 July 2023; 10:30 | Report | Bacigalupo 3 | Goals | Arima, Nishiyama 4 | Marine Messe Fukuoka, Fukuoka; Referees: Alessia Ferrari (ITA), Lee-Anne Stewart (RSA) |

13th place game

| 24 July 2023; 10:30 | Report | China | 18–10 | Japan | Marine Messe Fukuoka, Fukuoka; Referees: Adil Aimbetov (KAZ), Lee-Anne Stewart (RSA) |
| 24 July 2023; 10:30 | Report | Score by quarters: 4–3, 5–3, 4–3, 5–1 | | | Marine Messe Fukuoka, Fukuoka; Referees: Adil Aimbetov (KAZ), Lee-Anne Stewart (RSA) |
| 24 July 2023; 10:30 | Report | Lu, Yan J. 3 | Goals | Ura 3 | Marine Messe Fukuoka, Fukuoka; Referees: Adil Aimbetov (KAZ), Lee-Anne Stewart (RSA) |
