= Artistic swimming at the 2023 World Aquatics Championships =

- Host city: Fukuoka, Japan
- Date(s): 14–22 July
- Venue(s): Marine Messe Fukuoka
- Events: 11

The artistic swimming events at the 2023 World Aquatics Championships were held from 14 to 22 July 2023 at the Marine Messe Fukuoka in Fukuoka, Japan.

== Schedule ==
11 events were held.

All times are local (UTC+9).

Date	Time	Event
14 July 2023	09:00	Solo Technical Women
14 July 2023	12:00	Solo Technical Men
14 July 2023	15:00	Duet Technical Group B
14 July 2023	17:50	Duet Technical Group A
15 July 2023	10:00	Acrobatic Routine
15 July 2023	14:00	Mixed Duet Technical
15 July 2023	19:30	Solo Technical Women
16 July 2023	10:00	Team Technical
16 July 2023	16:30	Mixed Duet Technical
16 July 2023	19:30	Duet Technical
17 July 2023	09:00	Solo Free Women
17 July 2023	14:00	Solo Technical Men
17 July 2023	19:30	Acrobatic Routine
18 July 2023	09:00	Duet Free Group B
18 July 2023	12:00	Duet Free Group A
18 July 2023	15:00	Solo Free Men
18 July 2023	19:30	Team Technical
19 July 2023	16:30	Solo Free Men
19 July 2023	19:30	Solo Free Women
20 July 2023	10:00	Team Free
20 July 2023	19:30	Duet Free
21 July 2023	10:00	Mixed Duet Free
21 July 2023	19:30	Team Free
22 July 2023	10:00	Mixed Duet Free
22 July 2023	12:30	Gala Exhibition

== Medal summary ==
=== Medal table ===
* Host nation (Japan)

Rank	Nation	Gold	Silver	Bronze	Total
1	Japan*	4	1	2	7
2	Spain	3	1	3	7
3	China	3	1	1	5
4	Austria	1	2	0	3
5	United States	0	2	2	4
6	Italy	0	2	0	2
7	Colombia	0	1	0	1
7	Mexico	0	1	0	1
9	Great Britain	0	0	1	1
9	Kazakhstan	0	0	1	1
9	Ukraine	0	0	1	1
Totals (11 entries)		11	11	11	33

=== Men ===
Event	Gold		Silver		Bronze	
Solo free routine	Dennis González; Spain	193.0334	Gustavo Sánchez; Colombia	189.9625	Kenneth Gaudet; United States	179.5562
Solo technical routine	Fernando Díaz del Río; Spain	224.5550	Kenneth Gaudet; United States	216.8000	Eduard Kim; Kazakhstan	216.0000

=== Women ===
Event	Gold		Silver		Bronze	
Solo free routine	Yukiko Inui; Japan	254.6062	Vasiliki Alexandri; Austria	229.3251	Kate Shortman; Great Britain	219.9542
Solo technical routine	Yukiko Inui; Japan	276.5717	Vasiliki Alexandri; Austria	264.4200	Iris Tió; Spain	254.2100
Duet free routine	Austria; Anna-Maria Alexandri; Eirini-Marina Alexandri	255.4583	China; Wang Liuyi; Wang Qianyi	255.2480	Japan; Moe Higa; Mashiro Yasunaga	249.5167
Duet technical routine	Japan; Moe Higa; Mashiro Yasunaga	273.9500	Italy; Linda Cerruti; Lucrezia Ruggiero	263.0334	Spain; Alisa Ozhogina; Iris Tió	257.8368

=== Mixed ===
Event	Gold		Silver		Bronze	
Mixed duet free routine	China; Cheng Wentao; Shi Haoyu	225.1020	Mexico; Itzamary González; Diego Villalobos	192.5500	Spain; Dennis González; Mireia Hernández	183.4207
Mixed duet technical routine	Japan; Tomoka Sato; Yotaro Sato	255.5066	Spain; Dennis González; Emma García	248.0499	China; Cheng Wentao; Shi Haoyu	247.3033

=== Team ===
Event	Gold		Silver		Bronze	
Acrobatic routine	China; Chang Hao; Cheng Wentao; Feng Yu; Shi Haoyu; Wang Ciyue; Xiang Binxuan; Xiao Yanning; Zhang Yayi	238.0033	United States; Anita Álvarez; Jaime Czarkowski; Nicole Dzurko; Keana Hunter; Audrey Kwon; Calista Liu; Bill May; Daniella Ramirez	232.4033	Japan; Moka Fujii; Ikoi Hirota; Moeka Kijima; Tomoka Sato; Yotaro Sato; Hikari Suzuki; Akane Yanagisawa; Megumu Yoshida	220.5867
Free routine	China; Chang Hao; Feng Yu; Wang Ciyue; Wang Liuyi; Wang Qianyi; Xiang Binxuan; Xiao Yanning; Zhang Yayi	329.1687	Japan; Moe Higa; Moeka Kijima; Uta Kobayashi; Ayano Shimada; Ami Wada; Akane Yanagisawa; Mashiro Yasunaga; Megumu Yoshida	317.8085	Ukraine; Maryna Aleksiiva; Vladyslava Aleksiiva; Marta Fiedina; Veronika Hryshko; Daria Moshynska; Anhelina Ovchynnikova; Anastasiia Shmonina; Valeriya Tyshchenko	256.2415
Technical routine	Spain; Cristina Arámbula; Marina García Polo; Meritxell Mas; Alisa Ozhogina; Paula Ramírez; Sara Saldaña; Iris Tió; Blanca Toledano	281.6893	Italy; Linda Cerruti; Marta Iacoacci; Sofia Mastroianni; Enrica Piccoli; Lucrezia Ruggiero; Isotta Sportelli; Giulia Vernice; Francesca Zunino	274.5155	United States; Anita Álvarez; Jaime Czarkowski; Megumi Field; Audrey Kwon; Jacklyn Luu; Daniella Ramirez; Ruby Remati; Natalia Vega	273.7396
