= Artistic swimming at the 2023 World Aquatics Championships – Men's solo free routine =

2023 World Aquatics Championships
- Venue: Marine Messe Fukuoka
- Location: Fukuoka, Japan
- Dates: 18 July (preliminary); 19 July (final)
- Competitors: 10 from 10 nations
- Winning points: 193.0334

Medalists
gold medal	Dennis González	Spain
silver medal	Gustavo Sánchez	Colombia
bronze medal	Kenneth Gaudet	United States

The men's solo free routine was an artistic swimming competition at the 2023 World Aquatics Championships was held on 18 and 19 July 2023.

== Results ==
The preliminary round was started on 18 July at 15:00. The final was held on 19 July at 16:30.

Rank	Swimmer	Nationality	Preliminary		Final	
Rank	Swimmer	Nationality	Points	Rank	Points	Rank
1st place, gold medalist(s)	Dennis González	Spain	169.8521	4	193.0334	1
2nd place, silver medalist(s)	Gustavo Sánchez	Colombia	166.3022	6	189.9625	2
3rd place, bronze medalist(s)	Kenneth Gaudet	United States	179.7834	1	179.5562	3
4	Yotaro Sato	Japan	167.7478	5	167.9709	4
5	Ranjuo Tomblin	Great Britain	172.5166	3	166.1792	5
6	Quentin Rakotomalala	France	145.3501	7	155.9813	6
7	Kantinan Adisaisiributr	Thailand	136.0416	8	139.9063	7
8	Javier Ruisanchez	Puerto Rico	104.5375	9	103.7500	8
9	Andy Ávila	Cuba	84.8166	10	95.6146	9
	Eduard Kim	Kazakhstan	173.0499	2	Did not start	
