= Artistic swimming at the 2023 World Aquatics Championships – Men's solo technical routine =

Artistic swimming at 2023 World Aquatics Championships (14-17 July 2023)

Men's solo technical routine at the 2023 World Aquatics Championships
- Venue: Marine Messe Fukuoka
- Location: Fukuoka, Japan
- Dates: 14 July (preliminary); 17 July (final)
- Competitors: 10 from 10 nations
- Winning points: 224.5550

Medalists
gold medal	Fernando Díaz del Río	Spain
silver medal	Kenneth Gaudet	United States
bronze medal	Eduard Kim	Kazakhstan

The men's solo technical routine was an artistic swimming competition at the 2023 World Aquatics Championships was held on 14 and 17 July 2023.

== Results ==
The preliminary round was started on 14 July at 09:27. The final was held on 17 July at 14:00.

Rank	Swimmer	Nationality	Preliminary		Final	
Rank	Swimmer	Nationality	Points	Rank	Points	Rank
1st place, gold medalist(s)	Fernando Díaz del Río	Spain	220.4034	1	224.5550	1
2nd place, silver medalist(s)	Kenneth Gaudet	United States	214.4916	2	216.8000	2
3rd place, bronze medalist(s)	Eduard Kim	Kazakhstan	180.5634	5	216.0000	3
4	Gustavo Sánchez	Colombia	202.2200	3	204.8617	4
5	Ranjuo Tomblin	Great Britain	166.8601	6	193.7500	5
6	Kantinan Adisaisiributr	Thailand	157.5800	8	180.1168	6
7	Joel Benavides	Mexico	163.5466	7	170.7166	7
8	Quentin Rakotomalala	France	186.7233	4	167.3266	8
9	Javier Ruisanchez	Puerto Rico	125.8333	10	136.8817	9
10	Andy Ávila	Cuba	128.4033	9	136.3867	10
