= Zhang Yiyao =

Chinese artistic swimmer (born 2002)

Personal information
- Nationality: Chinese
- Born: 13 March 2002 (age 24)

Sport
- Country: China
- Sport: Artistic swimming
- Partner: Shi Haoyu
Medal record
Women's artistic swimming
Representing China
Event	1st	2nd	3rd
World Championships	0	0	3
Total	0	0	3
World Championships
Bronze medal – third place	2022 Budapest	Mixed duet technical routine
Bronze medal – third place	2022 Budapest	Mixed duet free routine
Bronze medal – third place	2023 Fukuoka	Mixed duet technical routine
World Junior Championships
Silver medal – second place	2018 Budapest	Mixed duet technical routine
Silver medal – second place	2018 Budapest	Mixed duet free routine

Zhang Yiyao (born 13 March 2002) is a Chinese artistic swimmer. At the 2022 World Aquatics Championships, she won a bronze medal in the mixed duet technical routine and a bronze medal in the mixed duet free routine. In 2018, she won two silver medals in mixed duet events at the World Junior Championships and four gold medals, two in mixed duet events and two in team events, at the leg of the 2018 Artistic Swimming World Series held in Beijing.

== Background ==
Yiyao was born 13 March 2002 in China.

== Career ==
=== 2018 ===
At the second leg of the 2018 FINA Artistic Swimming World Series, held in Beijing in April, Yiyao won two gold medals in team events, the team technical routine and the team free routine, contributing in a reserve role for each event. In the mixed duet technical routine, she and her partner Shi Haoyu won the gold medal with a score of 76.9274 points. They followed up their performance with another gold medal, this time in the mixed duet free routine with a score of 77.8667 points. Later in the year, in July at the 2018 World Junior Artistic Swimming Championships in Budapest, Hungary, she won silver medals in the mixed duet technical routine, with a score of 79.3538 points, and the mixed duet free routine, with a score of 81.4667 points, competing with partner Shi Haoyu in both events.

=== 2022 World Aquatics Championships ===
2022 World Championships
Bronze medal – third place	mixed duet technical routine	86.4425
Bronze medal – third place	mixed duet free routine	88.4000

In the preliminaries of the mixed duet technical routine at the 2022 World Aquatics Championships, held in Budapest, Hungary with artistic swimming contested in June, Yiyao and her partner Shi Haoyu scored 84.8232 points, advancing to the final ranking third. For their performance in the final two days later, the duo scored 86.4425 points and won the bronze medal behind gold medalists Giorgio Minisini and Lucrezia Ruggiero of Italy and silver medalists Yotaro Sato and Tomoka Sato of Japan. In the preliminaries of the mixed duet free routine four days later, the duo qualified for the final with an overall third-rank and score of 87.8333 points. Improving their score to 88.4000 points in the final with choreography to music by Chinese musical artist Yang Bingyin with a "Swordsmen" theme, they won the bronze medal.

== International championships ==
Meet	mixed duet technical routine	mixed duet free routine
Junior level
WJC 2018	(silver) (79.3538)	(silver) (81.4667)
Senior level
WC 2022	(bronze) (86.4425)	(bronze) (88.4000)

== Artistic Swimming World Series circuits ==
The following medals Yiyao has won at Artistic Swimming World Series circuits.

Edition	Gold medals	Silver medals	Bronze medals	Total
2018	4	0	0	4
Total	4	0	0	4

== See also ==
- China at the 2022 World Aquatics Championships
