= Japan at the 2022 World Aquatics Championships =

- Flag of Japan
- World Aquatics code: JPN
- National federation: Japan Swimming Federation
- Website: swim.or.jp

in Budapest, Hungary
- Competitors: 58 in 5 sports
- Medals: Gold 2 Silver 8 Bronze 3 Total 13

World Aquatics Championships appearances
- 1973; 1975; 1978; 1982; 1986; 1991; 1994; 1998; 2001; 2003; 2005; 2007; 2009; 2011; 2013; 2015; 2017; 2019; 2022; 2023; 2024; 2025

Japan competed at the 2022 World Aquatics Championships in Budapest, Hungary from 18 June to 3 July. 58 competitors took part in all 5 sports held at the championships; artistic swimming, open water swimming, swimming, diving, and water polo.

== Medalists ==
| Medal | Name | Sport | Event | Date |
|---|---|---|---|---|
| Gold | Yukiko Inui | Artistic swimming | Solo technical routine | June 18 |
| Gold | Yukiko Inui | Artistic swimming | Solo free routine | June 22 |
| Silver | Tomoka Sato; Yotaro Sato | Artistic swimming | Mixed Duet technical routine | June 20 |
| Silver | Moka Fujii; Moe Higa; Moeka Kijima; Tomoka Sato; Hikari Suzuki; Akane Yanagisawa; Mashiro Yasunaga; Megumu Yoshida | Artistic swimming | Free routine combination | June 20 |
| Silver | Moka Fujii; Moe Higa; Moeka Kijima; Tomoka Sato; Hikari Suzuki; Akane Yanagisawa; Mashiro Yasunaga; Megumu Yoshida | Artistic swimming | Team technical routine | June 21 |
| Silver | Yu Hanaguruma | Swimming | Men's 200 metre breaststroke | June 23 |
| Silver | Naoki Mizunuma | Swimming | Men's 100 metre butterfly | June 24 |
| Silver | Tomoka Sato; Yotaro Sato | Artistic swimming | Mixed Duet free routine | June 25 |
| Silver | Rin Kaneto; Sayaka Mikami | Diving | Women's synchronized 3 metre springboard | July 3 |
| Silver | Rikuto Tamai | Diving | Men's 10 metre platform | July 3 |
| Bronze | Tomoru Honda | Swimming | Men's 200 metre butterfly | June 21 |
| Bronze | Daiya Seto | Swimming | Men's 200 metre individual medley | June 22 |
| Bronze | Moka Fujii; Moe Higa; Moeka Kijima; Tomoka Sato; Hikari Suzuki; Akane Yanagisawa; Mashiro Yasunaga; Megumu Yoshida | Artistic swimming | Team free routine | June 24 |

Medals by sport
| Sport | 1st place, gold medalist(s) | 2nd place, silver medalist(s) | 3rd place, bronze medalist(s) | Total |
| Artistic swimming | 2 | 4 | 1 | 7 |
| Swimming | 0 | 2 | 2 | 4 |
| Diving | 0 | 2 | 0 | 2 |
| Total | 2 | 8 | 3 | 13 |

== Artistic Swimming ==
Japan entered 13 artistic swimmers.

Women

| Athlete | Event | Preliminaries | | Final | |
| Athlete | Event | Points | Rank | Points | Rank |
|---|---|---|---|---|---|
| Yukiko Inui | Solo technical routine | 91.9189 | 1 Q | 92.8662 | 1st place, gold medalist(s) |
| Yukiko Inui | Solo free routine | 94.5667 | 1 Q | 95.3667 | 1st place, gold medalist(s) |
| Moe Higa; Megumu Yoshida | Duet technical routine | 90.0294 | 4 Q | 89.9444 | 4 |
| Moka Fujii; Moe Higa; Moeka Kijima; Tomoka Sato; Akane Yanagisawa; Mashiro Yasunaga; Megumu Yoshida; Rie Yoshida | Team technical routine | 91.2049 | 2 Q | 92.2261 | 2nd place, silver medalist(s) |
| Moka Fujii; Moe Higa; Moeka Kijima; Tomoka Sato; Hikari Suzuki; Akane Yanagisawa; Mashiro Yasunaga; Megumu Yoshida | Team free routine | 92.7667 | 3 Q | 93.1333 | 3rd place, bronze medalist(s) |
| Moka Fujii; Moe Higa; Asaka Hosokawa; Yuka Kawase; Moeka Kijima; Hikari Suzuki; Akane Yanagisawa; Mashiro Yasunaga; Megumu Yoshida; Rie Yoshida | Free routine combination | 92.8333 | 2 Q | 93.5667 | 2nd place, silver medalist(s) |

Mixed

| Athlete | Event | Preliminaries | | Final | |
| Athlete | Event | Points | Rank | Points | Rank |
|---|---|---|---|---|---|
| Tomoka Sato; Yotaro Sato | Duet technical routine | 85.8086 | 2 Q | 86.5939 | 2nd place, silver medalist(s) |
| Tomoka Sato; Yotaro Sato | Duet free routine | 88.9000 | 2 Q | 89.7333 | 2nd place, silver medalist(s) |

== Diving ==
Japan entered 9 divers.

Men

| Athlete | Event | Preliminaries | | Semifinals | | Final | |
| Athlete | Event | Points | Rank | Points | Rank | Points | Rank |
|---|---|---|---|---|---|---|---|
| Shu Ohkubo | 10 m platform | 381.10 | 12 Q | 373.75 | 12 Q | 370.25 | 12 |
| Sho Sakai | 3 m springboard | 401.95 | 5 Q | 360.95 | 12 Q | 424.00 | 6 |
| Haruki Suyama | 3 m springboard | 364.45 | 18 Q | 392.75 | 9 Q | 344.90 | 12 |
| Rikuto Tamai | 1 m springboard | 366.70 | 5 Q | —N/a | | 326.60 | 11 |
| Rikuto Tamai | 10 m platform | 455.50 | 3 Q | 471.95 | 3 Q | 488.00 | 2nd place, silver medalist(s) |

Women

| Athlete | Event | Preliminaries | | Semifinals | | Final | |
| Athlete | Event | Points | Rank | Points | Rank | Points | Rank |
|---|---|---|---|---|---|---|---|
| Matsuri Arai | 10 m platform | 270.60 | 17 Q | 316.70 | 5 Q | 307.00 | 6 |
| Haruka Enomoto | 3 m springboard | 273.45 | 14 Q | 280.90 | 10 Q | 281.05 | 10 |
| Minami Itahashi | 10 m platform | 239.75 | 21 | did not advance | | | |
| Sayaka Mikami | 3 m springboard | 209.65 | 6 Q | 297.00 | 6 Q | 294.70 | 7 |
| Rin Kaneto; Sayaka Mikami | 3 m synchronized springboard | 275.10 | 5 Q | —N/a | | 303.00 | 2nd place, silver medalist(s) |
| Matsuri Arai; Minami Itahashi | 10 m synchronized platform | 275.46 | 4 Q | —N/a | | 297.84 | 4 |

Mixed

| Athlete | Event | Points | Rank |
|---|---|---|---|
| Haruki Suyama; Haruka Enomoto | 3 m synchronized springboard | 266.46 | 9 |

== Open water swimming ==
Japan entered 7 open water swimmers ( 3 male and 4 female)

Men

| Athlete | Event | Time | Rank |
|---|---|---|---|
| Kaiki Furuhata | Men's 5 km | 56:24.6 | 18 |
| Taishin Minamide | Men's 5 km | 56:22.3 | 16 |
| Taishin Minamide | Men's 10 km | 1:54:28.5 | 16 |
| Taishin Minamide | Men's 25 km | 5:09:26.1 | 14 |
| Taiki Nonaka | Men's 10 km | 1:58:42.5 | 29 |

Women

| Athlete | Event | Time | Rank |
|---|---|---|---|
| Airi Ebina | Women's 5 km | 1:00:00.0 | 11 |
| Airi Ebina | Women's 10 km | 2:05:51.7 | 21 |
| Hanano Kato | Women's 25 km | 5:26:30.9 | 9 |
| Yukimi Moriyama | Women's 5 km | 1:00:03.7 | 13 |
| Yumi Tou | Women's 10 km | 2:10:32.2 | 40 |

Mixed

| Athlete | Event | Time | Rank |
|---|---|---|---|
| Airi Ebina; Kaiki Furuhata; Yukimi Moriyama; Taishin Minamide | Team | 1:06:32.9 | 9 |

== Swimming ==
Japan entered 18 swimmers.

Men

| Athlete | Event | Heat | | Semifinal | | Final | |
| Athlete | Event | Time | Rank | Time | Rank | Time | Rank |
|---|---|---|---|---|---|---|---|
| Yu Hanaguruma | 200 m breaststroke | 2:09.86 | 6 Q | 2:08.75 | 3 Q | 2:08.38 | 2nd place, silver medalist(s) |
| Tomoru Honda | 200 m butterfly | 1:54.94 | 3 Q | 1:54.01 | 2 Q | 1:53.61 | 3rd place, bronze medalist(s) |
| Tomoru Honda | 400 m individual medley | 4:12.24 | 6 Q | —N/a | | 4:12.20 | 7 |
| Ryosuke Irie | 50 m backstroke | 24.85 | 8 Q | Withdrew | | did not advance | |
| Ryosuke Irie | 100 m backstroke | 53.16 | 2 Q | 52.85 | 7 Q | 52.83 | 7 |
| Katsuhiro Matsumoto | 100 m freestyle | 48.83 | 23 | did not advance | | | |
| Katsuhiro Matsumoto | 200 m freestyle | 1:46.72 | 10 Q | 1:46.63 | =12 | did not advance | |
| Katsuhiro Matsumoto | 100 m butterfly | 51.78 | 11 Q | 51.57 | 13 | did not advance | |
| Naoki Mizunuma | 50 m butterfly | 23.60 | 20 | did not advance | | | |
| Naoki Mizunuma | 100 m butterfly | 51.46 | 5 Q | 50.81 NR | 2 Q | 50.94 | 2nd place, silver medalist(s) |
| Ryuya Mura | 100 m breaststroke | 59.90 | =7 Q | 59.64 | 10 | did not advance | |
| Ryuya Mura | 200 m breaststroke | 2:10.20 | 8 Q | 2:09.69 | 8 Q | 2:08.86 | 4 |
| Daiya Seto | 200 m individual medley | 1:58.29 | 3 Q | 1:56.74 | 3 Q | 1:56.22 | 3rd place, bronze medalist(s) |
| Daiya Seto | 400 m individual medley | 4:10.51 | 4 Q | —N/a | | 4:11.93 | 6 |
| Takumi Terada | 200 m butterfly | 1:56.70 | 15 Q | 1:56.07 | 13 | did not advance | |
| Ryosuke Irie; Ryuya Mura; Naoki Mizunuma; Katsuhiro Matsumoto | 4 × 100 m medley relay | 3:34.17 | 9 | —N/a | | did not advance | |

Women

| Athlete | Event | Heat | | Semifinal | | Final | |
| Athlete | Event | Time | Rank | Time | Rank | Time | Rank |
|---|---|---|---|---|---|---|---|
| Reona Aoki | 50 m breaststroke | 30.80 | 12 Q | 30.71 | 11 | did not advance | |
| Reona Aoki | 100 m breaststroke | 1:07.35 | 16 Q | 1:06.07 | 5 Q | 1:06.38 | 5 |
| Kina Hayashi | 200 m butterfly | 2:08.63 | 3 Q | 2:08.32 | 9 | did not advance | |
| Waka Kobori | 400 m freestyle | 4:08.55 | 11 | —N/a | | did not advance | |
| Chiho Mizuguchi | 200 m butterfly | 2:11.65 | 16 Q | 2:12.54 | 16 | did not advance | |
| Miyu Namba | 400 m freestyle | 4:08.07 | 9 | —N/a | | did not advance | |
| Miyu Namba | 800 m freestyle | 8:32.91 | 10 | —N/a | | did not advance | |
| Miyu Namba | 1500 m freestyle | 16:20.45 | 10 | —N/a | | did not advance | |
| Yui Ohashi | 200 m individual medley | 2:12.22 | 12 Q | 2:12.05 | 13 | did not advance | |
| Yui Ohashi | 400 m individual medley | 4:39.52 | 6 Q | —N/a | | 4:37.99 | 5 |
| Rika Omoto | 50 m freestyle | 25.38 | 18 | did not advance | | | |
| Rika Omoto | 200 m individual medley | 2:11.28 | 8 Q | 2:10.65 | 7 | 2:10.01 | 4 |
| Ageha Tanigawa | 400 m individual medley | 4:40.70 | 8 Q | —N/a | | 4:44.28 | 8 |
| Momoka Yoshii; Miyu Namba; Aoi Masuda; Waka Kobori | 4 × 200 m freestyle relay | 7:58.67 | 7 Q | —N/a | | 8:00.03 | 8 |

Mixed

| Athlete | Event | Heat | | Final | |
| Athlete | Event | Time | Rank | Time | Rank |
|---|---|---|---|---|---|
| Ryosuke Irie; Reona Aoki; Naoki Mizunuma; Rika Omoto | 4 × 100 m medley relay | 3:45.08 | 6 Q | 3:45.28 | 7 |

== Water polo ==
Summary

| Team | Event | Group stage | | | | Playoff | Quarterfinal | Semifinal | Final / BM | |
| Team | Event | Opposition Score | Opposition Score | Opposition Score | Rank | Opposition Score | Opposition Score | Opposition Score | Opposition Score | Rank |
|---|---|---|---|---|---|---|---|---|---|---|
| Japan | Men's tournament | Germany; W 12–11 | Greece; L 7–18 | Croatia; L 13–21 | 3 P/off | Montenegro; L 9–10 | —N/a | Australia; W 15–7 | Georgia; W 16–15 | 9 |

Men's tournament

Team roster

The following is Japanese roster in the Water polo at the 2022 World Aquatics Championships – Men's tournament.

Head coach: Yoshinori Shiota

- 1 Katsuyuki Tanamura GK
- 2 Seiya Adachi FP
- 3 Taiyo Watanabe FP
- 4 Daichi Ogihara FP
- 5 Yuki Maita FP
- 6 Toi Suzuki FP
- 7 Kiyomu Date FP
- 8 Mitsuru Takata FP
- 9 Atsushi Arai FP
- 10 Yusuke Inaba FP
- 11 Keigo Okawa FP
- 12 Kenta Araki FP
- 13 Tomoyoshi Fukushima GK

Group play

| Pos | Team | Pld | W | D | L | GF | GA | GD | Pts | Qualification |
|---|---|---|---|---|---|---|---|---|---|---|
| 1 | Greece | 3 | 2 | 1 | 0 | 42 | 23 | +19 | 5 (Note: Greece 8–8 Croatia) | Quarterfinals |
| 2 | Croatia | 3 | 2 | 1 | 0 | 42 | 30 | +12 | 5 | Playoffs |
| 3 | Japan | 3 | 1 | 0 | 2 | 32 | 50 | −18 | 2 | Playoffs |
| 4 | Germany | 3 | 0 | 0 | 3 | 28 | 41 | −13 | 0 | |

Source: Sportresult
Rules for classification: 1) points; 2) head-to-head points; 3) head-to-head goal difference; 4) head-to-head number of goals scored; 5) Goal difference.
Notes:

| 21 June 2022; 18:00 | Report | Germany | 11–12 | Japan | Debrecen Swimming Pool Complex, Debrecen; Referees: Ivan Raković (SRB), Adil Aimbetov (KAZ) |
| 21 June 2022; 18:00 | Report | Score by quarters: 2–5, 2–3, 2–3, 5–1 | | | Debrecen Swimming Pool Complex, Debrecen; Referees: Ivan Raković (SRB), Adil Aimbetov (KAZ) |
| 21 June 2022; 18:00 | Report | Schütze 3 | Goals | Inaba 5 | Debrecen Swimming Pool Complex, Debrecen; Referees: Ivan Raković (SRB), Adil Aimbetov (KAZ) |

| 23 June 2022; 19:30 | Report | Japan | 7–18 | Greece | Debrecen Swimming Pool Complex, Debrecen; Referees: Adil Aimbetov (KAZ), Michael Goldenberg (USA) |
| 23 June 2022; 19:30 | Report | Score by quarters: 1–3, 2–4, 2–5, 2–6 | | | Debrecen Swimming Pool Complex, Debrecen; Referees: Adil Aimbetov (KAZ), Michael Goldenberg (USA) |
| 23 June 2022; 19:30 | Report | three players 2 | Goals | Argyropoulos 6 | Debrecen Swimming Pool Complex, Debrecen; Referees: Adil Aimbetov (KAZ), Michael Goldenberg (USA) |

| 25 June 2022; 18:00 | Report | Japan | 13–21 | Croatia | Debrecen Swimming Pool Complex, Debrecen; Referees: Michael Goldenberg (USA), David Gómez (ESP) |
| 25 June 2022; 18:00 | Report | Score by quarters: 3–4, 6–3, 2–7, 2–7 | | | Debrecen Swimming Pool Complex, Debrecen; Referees: Michael Goldenberg (USA), David Gómez (ESP) |
| 25 June 2022; 18:00 | Report | Inaba 5 | Goals | Kharkov, Krapić 5 | Debrecen Swimming Pool Complex, Debrecen; Referees: Michael Goldenberg (USA), David Gómez (ESP) |

Playoffs

| 27 June 2022; 14:00 | Report | Montenegro | 10–9 | Japan | Alfréd Hajós National Swimming Stadium, Budapest; Referees: Michael Goldenberg (USA), Michiel Zwart (NED) |
| 27 June 2022; 14:00 | Report | Score by quarters: 3–1, 2–5, 3–2, 2–1 | | | Alfréd Hajós National Swimming Stadium, Budapest; Referees: Michael Goldenberg (USA), Michiel Zwart (NED) |
| 27 June 2022; 14:00 | Report | Perković 3 | Goals | Takata 2 | Alfréd Hajós National Swimming Stadium, Budapest; Referees: Michael Goldenberg (USA), Michiel Zwart (NED) |

9–12th place semifinals

| 29 June 2022; 17:00 | Report | Japan | 15–7 | Australia | Szeged Tiszavirág Pool, Szeged; Referees: Ivan Raković (SRB), Veselin Mišković (MNE) |
| 29 June 2022; 17:00 | Report | Score by quarters: 2–2, 5–2, 5–2, 3–1 | | | Szeged Tiszavirág Pool, Szeged; Referees: Ivan Raković (SRB), Veselin Mišković (MNE) |
| 29 June 2022; 17:00 | Report | Date 4 | Goals | seven players 1 | Szeged Tiszavirág Pool, Szeged; Referees: Ivan Raković (SRB), Veselin Mišković (MNE) |

Ninth place game

| 1 July 2022; 18:30 | Report | Japan | 16–15 | Georgia | Szeged Tiszavirág Pool, Szeged; Referees: Veselin Mišković (MNE), Ivan Raković (SRB) |
| 1 July 2022; 18:30 | Report | Score by quarters: 3–5, 7–4, 2–2, 4–4 | | | Szeged Tiszavirág Pool, Szeged; Referees: Veselin Mišković (MNE), Ivan Raković (SRB) |
| 1 July 2022; 18:30 | Report | Adachi 5 | Goals | Bitadze, Vapenski 4 | Szeged Tiszavirág Pool, Szeged; Referees: Veselin Mišković (MNE), Ivan Raković (SRB) |
