= Artistic swimming at the 2022 World Aquatics Championships – Mixed duet technical routine =

Mixed duet technical routine at the 2022 World Aquatics Championships
- Venue: Szechy Pool
- Location: Budapest, Hungary
- Dates: 18 June (preliminary); 20 June (final)
- Competitors: 26 from 13 nations
- Teams: 13
- Winning points: 89.2685

Medalists
gold medal	Giorgio Minisini; Lucrezia Ruggiero	Italy
silver medal	Tomoka Sato; Yotaro Sato	Japan
bronze medal	Shi Haoyu; Zhang Yiyao	China

The Mixed duet technical routine competition at the 2022 World Aquatics Championships will be held on 18 and 20 June 2022.

== Results ==
The preliminary round was started on 18 June at 13:00. The final was held on 20 June at 14:00.

Green denotes finalists

Rank	Nation	Swimmers	Preliminary		Final	
Rank	Nation	Swimmers	Points	Rank	Points	Rank
1st place, gold medalist(s)	Italy	Giorgio Minisini; Lucrezia Ruggiero	88.5734	1	89.2685	1
2nd place, silver medalist(s)	Japan	Tomoka Sato; Yotaro Sato	85.8086	2	86.5939	2
3rd place, bronze medalist(s)	China	Shi Haoyu; Zhang Yiyao	84.8232	3	86.4425	3
4	Spain	Emma García; Pau Ribes	84.3709	4	84.4829	4
5	United States	Claudia Coletti; Kenneth Gaudet	82.0709	5	82.8966	5
6	Colombia	Jennifer Cerquera; Gustavo Sánchez	78.5003	6	81.2272	6
7	Kazakhstan	Eduard Kim; Zhaklin Yakimova	77.9746	7	79.2599	7
8	Mexico	Joel Benavides; Trinidad Meza	76.4581	8	77.5890	8
9	Brazil	Fabiano Ferreira; Gabriela Regly	73.2235	9	74.8994	9
10	Slovakia	Jozef Solymosy; Silvia Solymosyová	72.2422	10	73.2881	10
11	Thailand	Kantinan Adisaisiributr; Voranan Toomchay	65.2202	12	67.3477	11
12	Puerto Rico	Javier Ruisanchez; Nicolle Torrens	65.5330	11	65.8801	12
13	Cuba	Andy Avila; Carelys Valdes	62.6229	13		
