= Artistic swimming at the 2024 World Aquatics Championships – Men's solo free routine =

Men's solo free routine at the 2024 World Aquatics Championships
- Venue: Aspire Dome
- Location: Doha, Qatar
- Dates: 6 February (preliminary); 7 February (final)
- Competitors: 9 from 9 nations
- Winning points: 210.1355

Medalists
gold medal	Giorgio Minisini	Italy
silver medal	Dennis González	Spain
bronze medal	Gustavo Sánchez	Colombia

The Men's solo free routine competition at the 2024 World Aquatics Championships was held on 6 and 7 February 2024.

== Results ==
The preliminary round was started on 6 February at 09:30. The final was held on 7 February at 20:00.

Rank	Swimmer	Nationality	Preliminary		Final	
Rank	Swimmer	Nationality	Points	Rank	Points	Rank
1st place, gold medalist(s)	Giorgio Minisini	Italy	174.1583	3	210.1355	1
2nd place, silver medalist(s)	Dennis González	Spain	191.3562	2	196.2750	2
3rd place, bronze medalist(s)	Gustavo Sánchez	Colombia	140.6583	6	192.0812	3
4	Yang Shuncheng	China	213.9999	1	176.3647	4
5	Kenneth Gaudet	United States	159.7918	4	166.6250	5
6	Kantinan Adisaisiributr	Thailand	152.8916	5	150.2583	6
7	Joel Benavides	Mexico	140.6459	7	134.2562	7
8	Renaud Barral	Belgium	118.8895	8	117.4333	8
9	Andy Ávila	Cuba	95.0625	9	111.9460	9
