= 2022 FINA Artistic Swimming World Series =

- Date: 19 March – 22 May 2022
- Competitors: 247 from 40 nations

The 2022 FINA Artistic Swimming World Series began on 19 March 2022 with a virtual event jointly hosted by the United States and Canada and ended on 22 May 2022 with an onsite super final event in Athens, Greece. The series consisted of four legs across three continents and featured solo, duet, and team artistic swimming events in female, male, and mixed categories. It was the final edition to use the name FINA Artistic Swimming World Series preceding a change of competition name on 9 December 2022 to FINA Artistic Swimming World Cup for the 2023 edition.

Mixed gender team events featured up to two men per team. In December 2022, following the conclusion of World Series, the International Olympic Committee announced it would be allowing men to compete in artistic swimming for the first time only in mixed gender teams events at the 2024 Olympic Games, using the same format for team composition, up to two men, as the World Series.

From 21 April through the end of the World Series, athletes and officials from Russia and Belarus were banned from participating due to the Russian invasion of Ukraine.

== Schedule ==
Originally the World Series was scheduled to include five legs across three continents, including a first ever joint hosting of a FINA Artistic Swimming World Series leg and a FINA Diving World Series leg in Kazan, Russia for the third leg in May 2022. However, due to the Russian invasion of Ukraine, which started on 24 February 2022, FINA canceled the leg of the World Series scheduled to take place in Kazan out of concern for the safety and well-being of participating athletes. To ensure the safety of participants, FINA required athletes and officials from Russia and Belarus to compete under neutral labels (no country name, flag, anthem, etc.) during competition. The designation "Independent FINA Athlete" (IFA) was the neutral term for competitors from the two countries. After initially allowing athletes and officials from both countries to participate as neutrals, FINA reversed its decision and banned the athletes and officials altogether effective 21 April 2022 through the end of competition. The updated schedule included the four non-canceled legs.

| Leg | Dates | Host | Venue | # athletes | # countries | Notes |
|---|---|---|---|---|---|---|
| 1 | 19–20 March^{[a]} | United States - Canada | Various | 80 | 15 | Virtual event |
| 2 | 1–3 April | Paris, France | Piscine Georges Vallerey | 124 | 26 | |
| 3 | 8–10 April | Kazan, Russia | Palace of Water Sports | – | – | Cancelled |
| 4 | 7–8 May^{[b]} | Australia | Various | 126 | 24 | Virtual event |
| 5 | 20–22 May | Athens, Greece | Olympic Athletic Center of Athens | 137 | 23 | Super Final |

^{a} Leg 1 was a virtual format with events competed between 19 and 25 February 2022 and performances webcast publicly with commentary on 19 and 20 March 2022.
^{b} Leg 4 was a virtual format with events competed between 8 and 19 April 2022 and performances webcast publicly with commentary on 7 and 8 May 2022.

== Medal summary ==
Each National Swimming Federation was permitted multiple entrants in individual and duet events, however, medals were awarded to the top three competitors in each event, with only the highest scoring competitor from each National Swimming Federation eligible for a final ranking and medal.

=== Medal table ===
| Rank | Nation | Gold | Silver | Bronze | Total |
|---|---|---|---|---|---|
| 1 | United States (USA) | 10 | 6 | 4 | 20 |
| 2 | Spain (ESP) | 10 | 4 | 1 | 15 |
| 3 | Austria (AUT) | 6 | 0 | 0 | 6 |
| 4 | Independent FINA Athletes | 5 | 1 | 2 | 8 |
| 5 | France (FRA) | 4 | 1 | 2 | 7 |
| 6 | Canada (CAN) | 3 | 9 | 1 | 13 |
| 7 | Israel (ISR) | 3 | 6 | 8 | 17 |
| 8 | Japan (JPN) | 2 | 4 | 3 | 9 |
| 9 | Colombia (COL) | 2 | 0 | 1 | 3 |
| 10 | Puerto Rico (PRI) | 1 | 2 | 5 | 8 |
| 11 | Greece (GRE) | 1 | 2 | 0 | 3 |
| 12 | Italy (ITA) | 0 | 4 | 1 | 5 |
| 13 | Kazakhstan (KAZ) | 0 | 3 | 7 | 10 |
| 14 | Netherlands (NED) | 0 | 2 | 0 | 2 |
| 15 | South Korea (KOR) | 0 | 1 | 1 | 2 |
| 16 | Chile (CHI) | 0 | 0 | 1 | 1 |
| 16 | Germany (GER) | 0 | 0 | 1 | 1 |
| 16 | Slovakia (SVK) | 0 | 0 | 1 | 1 |
| 16 | Switzerland (SUI) | 0 | 0 | 1 | 1 |
| Totals (19 entries) | | 47 | 45 | 40 | 132 |

=== Female ===
==== Solo technical routine ====
| Event | Gold | | Silver | | Bronze | |
|---|---|---|---|---|---|---|
| United States; Canada | Varvara Subbotina; Independent FINA Athlete | 91.5848 | Itsuki Hirota; Japan | 82.5916 | Audrey Lamothe; Canada | 82.0037 |
| (France) Paris | Oriane Jaillardon; France | 83.5476 | Audrey Lamothe; Canada | 83.3653 | Polina Prikazchikova; Israel | 80.4161 |
| (Russia) Kazan | Cancelled | | | | | |
| Australia | Vasiliki Alexandri; Austria | 84.1776 | Audrey Lamothe; Canada | 83.0599 | Itsuki Hirota; Japan | 82.7571 |
| (Greece) Athens | Vasiliki Alexandri; Austria | 86.9450 | Anita Alvarez; United States | 84.6848 | Marlene Bojer; Germany | 80.0743 |

==== Solo free routine ====
| Event | Gold | | Silver | | Bronze | |
|---|---|---|---|---|---|---|
| United States; Canada | Eve Planeix; France | 87.4667 | Yuka Kawase; Japan | 84.2667 | Emma Grosvenor; Switzerland | 77.9667 |
| (France) Paris | Iris Tió; Spain | 86.7333 | Federica Sala; Italy | 85.8000 | Laelys Alavez; France | 83.9000 |
| (Russia) Kazan | Cancelled | | | | | |
| Australia | Audrey Lamothe; Canada | 84.6000 | Itsuki Hirota; Japan | 83.9000 | Polina Prikazchikova; Israel | 83.0667 |
| (Greece) Athens | Vasiliki Alexandri; Austria | 89.4333 | Iris Tió; Spain | 88.2000 | Anita Alvarez; United States | 87.1000 |

==== Duet technical routine ====
| Event | Gold | | Silver | | Bronze | |
|---|---|---|---|---|---|---|
| United States; Canada | Independent FINA Athletes; Varvara Subbotina; Svetlana Kolesnichenko | 93.1321 | France; Anastasia Bayandina; Daria Bayandina | 88.3151 | Japan; Siri Kawaguchi; Uta Kobayashi | 80.2902 |
| (France) Paris | France; Oriane Jaillardon; Romane Lunel | 83.7000 | Greece; Eleni Fragkaki; Krystalenia Gialama | 82.7753 | Israel; Shelly Bobritsky; Ariel Nassee | 82.4852 |
| (Russia) Kazan | Cancelled | | | | | |
| Australia | Austria; Anna-Maria Alexandri; Eirini-Marina Alexandri | 87.8449 | Israel; Shelly Bobritsky; Ariel Nassee | 82.6422 | Japan; Airi Kawaguchi; Uta Kobayashi | 81.7360 |
| (Greece) Athens | Austria; Anna-Maria Alexandri; Eirini-Marina Alexandri | 90.4430 | Netherlands; Bregje de Brouwer; Marloes Steenbeek | 84.8617 | United States; Megumi Field; Daniella Ramirez | 84.3622 |

==== Duet free routine ====
| Event | Gold | | Silver | | Bronze | |
|---|---|---|---|---|---|---|
| United States; Canada | United States; Megumi Field; Natalia Vega | 84.9000 | South Korea; Yoonseo Hur; Lee Ri-young | 84.2000 | Independent FINA Athletes; Marharyta Kiryliuk; Valeryia Valasach | 83.7333 |
| (France) Paris | United States; Megumi Field; Natalia Vega | 85.7667 | Israel; Shelly Bobritsky; Nikol Nahshonov | 83.8000 | France; Lalie Chassaigne; Sasha Comte | 83.2333 |
| (Russia) Kazan | Cancelled | | | | | |
| Australia | United States; Megumi Field; Natalia Vega | 84.8000 | Israel; Shelly Bobritsky; Nikol Nahshonov | 84.2667 | South Korea; Yoonseo Hur; Lee Ri-young | 82.7333 |
| (Greece) Athens | Austria; Anna-Maria Alexandri; Eirini-Marina Alexandri | 91.6000 | Netherlands; Bregje de Brouwer; Marloes Steenbeek | 86.6667 | Israel; Eden Blecher; Shelly Bobritsky | 85.8000 |

==== Team technical routine ====
| Event | Gold | | Silver | | Bronze | |
|---|---|---|---|---|---|---|
| United States; Canada | France | 87.7137 | Canada | 83.2592 | Independent FINA Athletes | 81.9504 |
| (France) Paris | United States | 86.0680 | Canada | 84.7341 | Israel | 82.5568 |
| (Russia) Kazan | Cancelled | | | | | |
| Australia | United States | 84.8199 | Canada | 83.5067 | Israel | 81.5018 |
| (Greece) Athens | United States | 86.1525 | Israel | 83.4367 | Kazakhstan | 79.2041 |

==== Team free routine ====
| Event | Gold | | Silver | | Bronze | |
|---|---|---|---|---|---|---|
| United States; Canada | Canada | 84.7000 | Independent FINA Athletes | 83.2333 | none awarded | |
| (France) Paris | Spain | 90.7000 | Canada | 85.7667 | Israel | 84.4667 |
| (Russia) Kazan | Cancelled | | | | | |
| Australia | Canada | 84.8000 | Israel | 83.9333 | Kazakhstan | 79.6000 |
| (Greece) Athens | Israel | 85.1333 | Kazakhstan | 81.5333 | Slovakia | 75.7333 |

=== Male ===
==== Solo technical routine ====
| Event | Gold | | Silver | | Bronze | |
|---|---|---|---|---|---|---|
| United States; Canada | Aleksandr Maltsev; Independent FINA Athlete | 90.4231 | Fernando Díaz del Río; Spain | 76.4571 | Javier Ruisanchez; Puerto Rico | 53.7147 |
| (France) Paris | Fernando Díaz del Río; Spain | 76.2795 | Javier Ruisanchez; Puerto Rico | 60.8774 | none awarded | |
| (Russia) Kazan | Cancelled | | | | | |
| Australia | Fernando Díaz del Río; Spain | 74.2865 | Eduard Kim; Kazakhstan | 69.8678 | Javier Ruisanchez; Puerto Rico | 57.9860 |
| (Greece) Athens | Fernando Díaz del Río; Spain | 77.9618 | Kenneth Gaudet; United States | 74.8963 | Eduard Kim; Kazakhstan | 74.8478 |

==== Solo free routine ====
| Event | Gold | | Silver | | Bronze | |
|---|---|---|---|---|---|---|
| United States; Canada | Javier Ruisanchez; Puerto Rico | 60.2000 | none awarded | | none awarded | |
| (France) Paris | Gustavo Sánchez; Colombia | 80.8667 | Nicolò Ogliari; Italy | 79.0667 | Javier Ruisanchez; Puerto Rico | 65.6333 |
| (Russia) Kazan | Cancelled | | | | | |
| Australia | Gustavo Sánchez; Colombia | 77.4667 | Javier Ruisanchez; Puerto Rico | 62.5333 | none awarded | |
| (Greece) Athens | Fernando Díaz del Río; Spain | 80.3333 | Nicolò Ogliari; Italy | 76.5000 | Kenneth Gaudet; United States | 76.4667 |

=== Mixed ===
==== Duet technical routine ====
| Event | Gold | | Silver | | Bronze | |
|---|---|---|---|---|---|---|
| United States; Canada | Independent FINA Athletes; Mayya Gurbanberdieva; Aleksandr Maltsev | 90.5697 | Spain; Emma García; Pau Ribes | 82.7569 | Puerto Rico; Nicolle Torrens; Javier Ruisanchez | 64.1346 |
| (France) Paris | Spain; Emma García; Pau Ribes | 84.3804 | United States; Ivy Davis; Kenneth Gaudet | 79.0104 | Colombia; Gustavo Sánchez; Jennifer Cerquera | 77.7850 |
| (Russia) Kazan | Cancelled | | | | | |
| Australia | Japan; Yotaro Sato; Tomoka Sato | 83.5156 | Spain; Emma García; Pau Ribes | 82.8584 | Kazakhstan; Eduard Kim; Zhaklin Yakimova | 78.8609 |
| (Greece) Athens | Spain; Emma García; Pau Ribes | 83.3138 | United States; Claudia Coletti; Kenneth Gaudet | 78.3346 | Kazakhstan; Eduard Kim; Zhaklin Yakimova | 78.2740 |

==== Duet free routine ====
| Event | Gold | | Silver | | Bronze | |
|---|---|---|---|---|---|---|
| United States; Canada | Independent FINA Athletes; Aleksandr Maltsev; Olesia Platonova | 91.9000 | Japan; Tomoka Sato; Yotaro Sato | 82.7000 | Puerto Rico; Nicolle Torrens; Javier Ruisanchez | 63.2333 |
| (France) Paris | Spain; Emma García; Pau Ribes | 85.5667 | United States; Claudia Coletti; Kenneth Gaudet | 83.0333 | Italy; Nicolò Ogliari; Federica Sala | 82.3667 |
| (Russia) Kazan | Cancelled | | | | | |
| Australia | Japan; Tomoka Sato; Yotaro Sato | 83.2667 | United States; Claudia Coletti; Kenneth Gaudet | 82.1000 | Spain; Judith Calvo Requena; Fernando Díaz del Río | 81.7333 |
| (Greece) Athens | Spain; Emma García; Pau Ribes | 84.0000 | Italy; Nicolò Ogliari; Federica Sala | 82.5667 | United States; Claudia Coletti; Kenneth Gaudet | 80.9333 |

==== Team highlight routine ====
| Event | Gold | | Silver | | Bronze | |
|---|---|---|---|---|---|---|
| United States; Canada | United States | 84.6333 | Canada | 82.9667 | none awarded | |
| (France) Paris (all female)^{[a]} | United States | 87.8333 | Canada | 85.5333 | Chile | 81.4333 |
| (Russia) Kazan | Cancelled | | | | | |
| Australia | United States | 87.8000 | Canada | 85.4000 | Kazakhstan | 80.4000 |
| (Greece) Athens | United States | 86.8333 | Greece | 85.0000 | Israel | 84.5667 |

^{a} Team highlight routine were composed of up to two men, events composed of only women were all female events.

==== Team free combination ====
| Event | Gold | | Silver | | Bronze | |
|---|---|---|---|---|---|---|
| United States; Canada | none awarded | | none awarded | | none awarded | |
| (France) Paris (all female)^{[a]} | Israel | 84.0667 | none awarded | | none awarded | |
| (Russia) Kazan | Cancelled | | | | | |
| Australia | Israel | 84.0667 | Kazakhstan | 79.4667 | none awarded | |
| (Greece) Athens | Greece | 85.9333 | Israel | 85.1667 | Kazakhstan | 80.8000 |

^{a} Team free combination were composed of up to two men, events composed of only women were all female events.

== Participating countries ==
Athletes from the following 40 countries competed in the World Series.

- Australia (12)
- Austria (3)
- Belgium (2)
- Bulgaria (6)
- Canada (17)
- Chile (10)
- Colombia (2)
- Curaçao (1)
- Czech Republic (6)
- Denmark (10)
- Finland (4)
- France (13)
- Georgia (1)
- Germany (2)
- Greece (11)
- Hungary (11)
- Independent FINA Athletes (17)
- Israel (12)
- Italy (2)
- Jamaica (2)
- Japan (6)
- Kazakhstan (14)
- Liechtenstein (2)
- Malta (2)
- Netherlands (2)
- Portugal (2)
- Puerto Rico (2)
- San Marino (2)
- Serbia (3)
- Singapore (8)
- Slovakia (11)
- Slovenia (2)
- South Korea (3)
- Spain (12)
- Sweden (4)
- Switzerland (7)
- Thailand (3)
- Turkey (2)
- United States (14)
- Uzbekistan (2)

== National Swimming Federation withdrawals ==
On 18 March 2022, the German Swimming Federation withdrew its athletes from the World Series. The German Swimming Federation rejoined the World Series in April on the fourth leg.

On 23 March 2022, the Russian Swimming Federation pulled all athletes from FINA events for the rest of the duration of the 2022 year, including the World Series. A little under one month later, on 21 April 2022, FINA banned all athletes and officials from Russia and Belarus from the World Series.
