= Artistic swimming at the 2022 World Aquatics Championships – Mixed duet free routine =

Mixed duet free routine at the 2022 World Aquatics Championships
- Venue: Szechy Pool
- Location: Budapest, Hungary
- Dates: 24 June (preliminary); 25 June (final)
- Competitors: 26 from 13 nations
- Teams: 13
- Winning points: 90.9667

Medalists
gold medal	Giorgio Minisini; Lucrezia Ruggiero	Italy
silver medal	Tomoka Sato; Yotaro Sato	Japan
bronze medal	Shi Haoyu; Zhang Yiyao	China

The Mixed duet free routine competition at the 2022 World Aquatics Championships was held on 24 and 25 June 2022.

== Results ==
The preliminary round was started on 24 June at 10:00. The final was held on 25 June at 13:30.

Green denotes finalists

Rank	Nation	Swimmers	Preliminary		Final	
Rank	Nation	Swimmers	Points	Rank	Points	Rank
1st place, gold medalist(s)	Italy	Giorgio Minisini; Lucrezia Ruggiero	90.5000	1	90.9667	1
2nd place, silver medalist(s)	Japan	Tomoka Sato; Yotaro Sato	88.9000	2	89.7333	2
3rd place, bronze medalist(s)	China	Shi Haoyu; Zhang Yiyao	87.8333	3	88.4000	3
4	Spain	Emma García; Pau Ribes	86.1667	4	87.1333	4
5	United States	Claudia Coletti; Kenneth Gaudet	83.6000	5	85.2000	5
6	Colombia	Jennifer Cerquera; Gustavo Sánchez	81.4667	6	83.0667	6
7	Kazakhstan	Eduard Kim; Zhaklin Yakimova	80.3000	7	82.3000	7
8	Brazil	Fabiano Ferreira; Gabriela Regly	77.2333	8	78.7667	8
9	Slovakia	Jozef Solymosy; Silvia Solymosyová	73.8333	9	75.1000	9
10	Thailand	Kantinan Adisaisiributr; Voranan Toomchay	67.4333	10	68.1333	10
11	Puerto Rico	Javier Ruisanchez; Nicolle Torrens	66.4000	11	65.7000	11
12	Cuba	Andy Avila; Carelys Valdes	64.5333	12	64.6333	12
13	South Africa	Laura Strugnell; Ayrton Sweeney	63.6000	13		
