= Audrey Lamothe =

Canadian artistic swimmer (born 2005)

Personal information
- Born: 18 February 2005 (age 21) Montreal, Quebec, Canada
- Height: 163 cm (5 ft 4 in)

Sport
- Country: Canada
- Sport: Artistic swimming
- Event(s): Solo technical routine, Solo free routine, Team technical routine, Team free routine, Mixed team highlight
- Club: Montréal Synchro
Medal record
Women's artistic swimming
Representing Canada
Event	1st	2nd	3rd
Pan American Games	0	0	1
Artistic Swimming World Series	2	8	1
Artistic Swimming World Cup	0	0	2
Total	2	8	4
Pan American Games
Bronze medal – third place	2023 Santiago	Women's team
Artistic Swimming World Series
Gold medal – first place	2022 USA-CAN	Team free routine
Gold medal – first place	2022 Australia	Solo free routine
Silver medal – second place	2022 USA-CAN	Team technical routine
Silver medal – second place	2022 USA-CAN	Mixed team highlight
Silver medal – second place	2022 Paris	Solo technical routine
Silver medal – second place	2022 Paris	Team technical routine
Silver medal – second place	2022 Paris	Mixed team highlight
Silver medal – second place	2022 Australia	Solo technical routine
Silver medal – second place	2022 Australia	Team technical routine
Silver medal – second place	2022 Australia	Mixed team highlight
Bronze medal – third place	2022 USA-CAN	Solo technical routine
Artistic Swimming World Cup
Bronze medal – third place	2023 Markham	Solo technical routine
Bronze medal – third place	2023 Markham	Solo free routine

Audrey Lamothe (born 18 February 2005) is a Canadian artistic swimmer. She is a 13-time medallist at Artistic Swimming World Series and World Cup circuits. She won 11 medals at the 2022 Artistic Swimming World Series, two gold medals, eight silver medals, and one bronze medal. She was the champion in the solo free routine at the leg of the World Series hosted virtually by Australia. At the 2022 World Aquatics Championships, she placed eighth in the team technical routine, ninth in the solo free routine and tenth in the solo technical routine. At the 2022 World Junior Championships, she placed fifth in the solo technical routine, fifth in the team technical routine, and sixth in the solo free routine.

== Background ==
Lamothe was born 18 February 2005 to parents Nathalie and Jean and began artistic swimming when she was 5 years old.

== Career ==
=== 2022 ===
==== 2022 Artistic Swimming World Series ====
On the first day of the first leg of the 2022 Artistic Swimming World Series, a virtual event in March hosted by the United States and Canada, Lamothe won the bronze medal in the solo technical routine with a score of 82.0037 points, competing to the music "Cry Me a River" by Michael Bublé. She won her second medal of the day in the team technical routine, helping win the silver medal in a hip hop and rap-themed performance with a final score of 83.2592 points. The second and final day of competition, she won a gold medal in the team free routine, helping score 84.7000 points and performing to a theme of "Triumph". She capped off competition in the mixed team highlight event, where the team debuted new choreography and won the silver medal with a score of 82.9667 points.

At the second leg of the World Series, held at Piscine Georges Vallerey in Paris, France in April, Lamothe won the silver medal in the solo technical routine with a score of 83.3653 points on day two. She won her second medal of the day as part of the mixed highlight event, with the team scoring a 85.5333 competing with music by Stan Erbrink in the theme of "Galaxy" to win the silver medal. The third and final day of competition, as part of the team technical routine in the theme of hip hop and rap, she won a silver medal with a team score of 84.7341.

For the leg of the World Series in May, conducted in virtual format, and hosted by Australia, Lamothe won a silver medal in the solo technical event reiterating the "Cry Me a River" by Michael Bublé music choice from the first leg of the series to place second with a score of 83.0599 points. Later in the day, she won a silver medal with the rest of her teammates in the team technical routine with a score of 83.5067, less than 1.5 points behind the first-place team from the United States. She won a third medal on day one in the mixed team highlight event, scoring 85.4000 points for their routine. In her final event of the World Series, she won the gold medal in the solo free routine on the second and final day of the Australia-hosted virtual leg, scoring 84.6000 points for her routine choreographed in the theme of "Hungarian Spirit".

==== 2022 World Aquatics Championships ====
In advance of the 2022 World Aquatics Championships in Budapest, Hungary, Lamothe took part in the Canada Artistic Swimming national team training camp in Quebec. For artistic swimming competition at the World Championships, she entered to compete in a total of five events, which was 50% of all events offered in artistic swimming at the Championships. On the first day of competition, 17 June, she ranked tenth in the preliminaries of the solo technical routine and qualified for the final with a score of 83.1821 points. Choosing to showcase her country with the music choice for her performance, she executed her choreography to fellow Canadian Michael Bublé's song "Cry Me a River". In the final the following day, she placed tenth with a score of 83.0909 points. In the preliminaries of the team technical routine on the morning of day three, she helped qualify for the final ranking seventh with a score of 84.7752 points. The following morning, she ranked ninth in the preliminaries of the solo free routine, advancing to the final with a score of 84.5333 points.

On day five of competition, she helped achieve an eighth-place finish in the final of the team technical routine with a final score of 84.4871 points. The following morning, the Canada team for the team free routine did not start competition. Later in the day, she placed ninth in the final of the solo free routine with a score of 85.4000 points. Prior to the start of competition for the highlight routine, she withdrew from competition in the event.

==== 2022 World Junior Championships ====
Lamothe was highlight in a FINA press release as a swimmer to watch at the 2022 World Junior Artistic Swimming Championships, leading up to the start of competition on 23 August in Québec. She presented the choreography to "Cry Me a River" as at the senior World Aquatics Championships for the solo technical routine on day one, even though time limits for some events at the World Junior Championships compared to the senior World Series and World Aquatics Championships were shorter, earning a score of 83.5463 points to improve upon her final score from the senior World Championships by over 0.45 points and place fifth. She finished 0.8441 points behind bronze medalist Oriane Jaillardon of France. Later in the day, she performed in the team technical routine, helping place fifth with a score of 83.5095 points. The following day, she scored 83.8667 points in the preliminaries of the solo free routine, qualifying for the final three days later ranking fifth. The final day of competition, 27 August, she placed sixth in the final of the solo free routine with a score of 84.1667 points.

=== 2023 ===
==== 2023 Artistic Swimming World Cup ====
At the stop of the 2023 Artistic Swimming World Cup, a World Aquatics competition retaining the same multi-location format as the FINA Artistic Swimming World Series and implementing a new scoring system, contested in March in Markham, Lamothe started competition with a bronze medal in the solo technical routine, finishing 46.5084 points behind silver medalist Yukiko Inui of Japan with a score of 196.2833 points. The next day, she achieved a score of 224.5041 points in the solo free routine, winning the bronze medal and finishing within 100 points of gold medalist Yukiko Inui. Her free routine featured new choreography in a new theme "Roman Gods", instead of reusing the same routine from the 2022 circuit.

== International championships ==
Meet	solo technical routine	solo free routine	highlight routine	team technical routine	team free routine
Junior level
WJC 2022	5th (83.5463)	6th (84.1667)		5th (83.5095)	
Senior level
WC 2022	10th (83.0909)	9th (85.4000)	WD	8th (84.4871)	DNS

== World series and world cup circuits ==
The following medals Lamothe has won at Artistic Swimming World Series (2022) and World Cup (2023) circuits.

Edition	Gold medals	Silver medals	Bronze medals	Total
2022	2	8	1	11
2023	0	0	2	2
Total	2	8	3	13

== See also ==
- 2022 FINA Artistic Swimming World Series
