= Fabiano Ferreira =

Brazilian swimmer

Personal information
- Full name: Fabiano Ferreira
- Born: 27 January 1998 (age 28)

Sport
- Country: Brazil
- Sport: Artistic swimming
- Event(s): Solo technical routine, Solo free routine, Mixed duet technical routine, Mixed duet free routine
- Club: Fluminense Football Club
- Partner: Gabriela Regly
Medal record
Men's artistic swimming
Representing Brazil
South American Championships
Bronze medal – third place	2021 Buenos Aires	mixed duet routine

Fabiano Ferreira (born 27 January 1998) is a Brazilian artistic swimmer. He and his partner Gabriela Regly competed at the 2022 World Aquatics Championships, placing 8th in the final of the mixed duet free routine and 9th in the final of the mixed duet technical routine.

== Career ==
=== 2021 South American Championships ===
Ferreira won the bronze medal at the South American Swimming Championships in Buenos Aires 2021 in the mixed duet with a score of 146.1865 points, which was less than 11 points behind gold medalists Gustavo Sánchez and Jennifer Cerquera of Colombia.

=== 2022 World Aquatics Championships ===
For his first event in artistic swimming competition at the 2022 World Aquatics Championships, held in Budapest, Hungary, Ferreira competed with his partner Gabriela Regly in the preliminaries of the mixed duet technical routine to achieve a score of 73.2235 points. Improving their score to 74.8994 points in the final, the duo placed ninth overall, 14.3691 points behind gold medalists Giorgio Minisini and Lucrezia Ruggiero of Italy. In the preliminaries of the mixed duet free routine on 24 June, he and Gabriela Regly scored 77.2333 points, qualifying for the final ranking 8th. He concluded the championships placing 8th in the final of the mixed duet free routine with a score of 78.7667 points.

== International championships ==
Meet	mixed duet technical routine	mixed duet free routine	mixed duet routine
SAC 2021	—N/a	—N/a	(bronze) (146.1865)
WC 2022	9th (74.8994)	8th (78.7667)	—N/a

== Personal life ==
Ferreira came out as gay via the social media platform Instagram.

== See also ==
- Brazil at the 2022 World Aquatics Championships
