= 2022 FINA World Junior Artistic Swimming Championships =

International synchronised swimming competition

17th FINA World Junior Artistic Swimming Championships
- Host city: Quebec City, Canada
- Date: 23–27 August
- Venue: Desjardins Aquatic Centre

The 17th FINA World Junior Artistic Swimming Championships was held from 23 to 27 August 2022 at Desjardins Aquatic Centre in Quebec City, Quebec, Canada. Competition was open to individuals between 15 and 18 years of age, inclusive, per their age at the end of the 2022 calendar year. It was the first FINA World Junior Artistic Swimming Championships to allow men to compete as individuals (in solo events).

In April 2022, FINA banned all Belarusian and Russian athletes and officials from the Championships due to the 2022 Russian invasion of Ukraine.

== Results ==
=== Women ===
Event	Gold		Silver		Bronze	
Solo technical	Moe Higa; Japan	88.4438	Susanna Pedotti; Italy	85.2942	Oriane Jaillardon; France	84.3904
Solo free	Moe Higa; Japan	89.7667	Marina Garcia Polo; Spain	87.6000	Susanna Pedotti; Italy	86.8000
Duet technical	Japan; Moka Fujii; Yukina Hotta	87.5591	Spain; Aitana Crespo; Mercedes Diaz Cervera; Lilou Lluis Valette^{[a]}	85.6516	France; Oriane Jaillardon; Romane Lunel	84.6559
Duet free	Japan; Moka Fujii; Yukina Hotta	88.7333	Spain; Aitana Crespo; Mercedes Diaz Cervera	88.2000	Italy; Alessia Macchi; Susanna Pedotti	86.5667
Team technical	Japan	88.3786	Spain	86.6667	Italy	85.2905
Team free	Spain	89.3000	Japan	89.2333	Italy	86.9333
Team free combination	Japan	89.1667	Spain	88.5000	Italy	86.3667

^{a} Individual was a reserve competitor.

=== Men ===
Event	Gold		Silver		Bronze	
Solo technical	Dennis Gonzalez Boneu; Spain	82.6639	Yotaro Sato; Japan	80.9088	Eduard Kim; Kazakhstan	79.2620
Solo free	Dennis Gonzalez Boneu; Spain	83.6000	Yotaro Sato; Japan	83.3000	Eduard Kim; Kazakhstan	79.6000

=== Mixed ===
Event	Gold		Silver		Bronze	
Duet technical	Japan; Yotaro Sato; Ayano Shimada	84.0251	Spain; Dennis Gonzalez Boneu; Valeria Parra Telegina	83.2318	Italy; Alessia Austranti; Filippo Pelati	79.5817
Duet free	Japan; Yotaro Sato; Ayano Shimada	85.7000	Spain; Valeria Parra Telegina; Dennis Gonzalez Boneu	84.6333	Kazakhstan; Eduard Kim; Zhaklin Yakimova	84.6333
Team highlight	Spain	87.5333	Italy	86.6000	Greece	84.7333

== Medal table ==
* Host nation (Canada)

Rank	Nation	Gold	Silver	Bronze	Total
1	Japan	8	3	0	11
2	Spain	4	7	0	11
3	Italy	0	2	6	8
4	Kazakhstan	0	0	3	3
5	France	0	0	2	2
6	Greece	0	0	1	1
Totals (6 entries)		12	12	12	36
