= Artistic swimming at the 2022 World Aquatics Championships – Solo technical routine =

Solo technical routine at the 2022 World Aquatics Championships
- Venue: Szechy Pool
- Location: Budapest, Hungary
- Dates: 17 June (preliminary); 18 June (final)
- Competitors: 26 from 26 nations
- Winning points: 92.8662

Medalists
gold medal	Yukiko Inui	Japan
silver medal	Marta Fiedina	Ukraine
bronze medal	Evangelia Platanioti	Greece

The Solo technical routine competition at the 2022 World Aquatics Championships was held on 17 and 18 June 2022.

== Results ==
The preliminary round was started on 17 June at 09:00. The final was held on 18 June at 16:00.

Green denotes finalists

Rank	Diver	Nationality	Preliminary		Final	
Rank	Diver	Nationality	Points	Rank	Points	Rank
1st place, gold medalist(s)	Yukiko Inui	Japan	91.9189	1	92.8662	1
2nd place, silver medalist(s)	Marta Fiedina	Ukraine	90.9382	2	91.9555	2
3rd place, bronze medalist(s)	Evangelia Platanioti	Greece	88.6163	3	89.5110	3
4	Linda Cerruti	Italy	88.6075	4	89.0142	4
5	Vasiliki Alexandri	Austria	87.9133	5	88.9841	5
6	Anita Alvarez	United States	85.4685	6	86.2807	6
7	Kate Shortman	Great Britain	83.8324	7	85.1632	7
8	Joana Jiménez	Mexico	83.1988	9	83.8394	8
9	Oriane Jaillardon	France	83.6928	8	83.6865	9
10	Audrey Lamothe	Canada	83.1821	10	83.0909	10
11	Marlene Bojer	Germany	80.8648	11	81.4450	11
12	Lee Ri-young	South Korea	80.5753	12	80.5294	12
13	Karina Magrupova	Kazakhstan	80.0042	13		
14	Ilona Fahrni	Switzerland	79.8704	14		
15	Jasmine Verbena	San Marino	78.9977	15		
16	Chiara Diky	Slovakia	77.5403	16		
17	Karolína Klusková	Czech Republic	74.8578	17		
18	Clara De León	Uruguay	74.2252	18		
19	Klara Šilobodec	Croatia	72.4970	19		
20	Clara Ternström	Sweden	72.2373	20		
21	Gabriela Alpajon	Cuba	68.6361	21		
22	Laura Strugnell	South Africa	68.1776	22		
23	Ana Culic	Malta	67.8191	23		
24	Sude Dicle	Turkey	66.6667	24		
25	Maria Salazar	Aruba	65.6580	25		
26	Maria Alfaro	Costa Rica	61.4452	26		
