= Artistic swimming at the 2022 World Aquatics Championships – Solo free routine =

Solo free routine at the 2022 World Aquatics Championships
- Venue: Szechy Pool
- Location: Budapest, Hungary
- Dates: 20 June (preliminary); 22 June (final)
- Competitors: 28 from 28 nations
- Winning points: 95.3667

Medalists
gold medal	Yukiko Inui	Japan
silver medal	Marta Fiedina	Ukraine
bronze medal	Evangelia Platanioti	Greece

The Solo free routine competition at the 2022 World Aquatics Championships was held on 20 and 22 June 2022.

== Results ==
The preliminary round was started on 20 June at 10:00. The final was held on 22 June at 16:00.

Green denotes finalists

Rank	Diver	Nationality	Preliminary		Final	
Rank	Diver	Nationality	Points	Rank	Points	Rank
1st place, gold medalist(s)	Yukiko Inui	Japan	94.5667	1	95.3667	1
2nd place, silver medalist(s)	Marta Fiedina	Ukraine	92.6333	2	93.8000	2
3rd place, bronze medalist(s)	Evangelia Platanioti	Greece	90.4000	3	91.7667	3
4	Linda Cerruti	Italy	90.2667	4	90.9667	4
5	Vasiliki Alexandri	Austria	89.5667	5	90.1333	5
6	Iris Tió	Spain	89.0333	6	89.7000	6
7	Anita Alvarez	United States	87.6333	7	87.6333	7
8	Eve Planeix	France	87.1667	8	87.4667	8
9	Audrey Lamothe	Canada	84.5333	9	85.4000	9
10	Marlene Bojer	Germany	82.8667	10	84.2000	10
11	Ilona Fahrni	Switzerland	82.2667	11	83.1000	11
12	Karina Magrupova	Kazakhstan	81.3000	12	82.0667	12
13	Jasmine Verbena	San Marino	80.8667	13		
14	Lee Ri-young	South Korea	80.6000	14		
15	Clara De León	Uruguay	77.5333	15		
16	Viktória Reichová	Slovakia	77.3000	16		
17	Szabina Hungler	Hungary	75.8667	17		
18	Karolína Klusková	Czech Republic	74.6667	18		
19	Klara Šilobodec	Croatia	73.9333	19		
20	Ece Üngör	Turkey	73.7333	20		
21	Zoe Poulis	Australia	72.4333	21		
21	Clara Ternström	Sweden	72.4333	21		
23	Patrawee Chayawararak	Thailand	70.1000	23		
24	Ana Culic	Malta	68.9000	24		
25	Gabriela Alpajon	Cuba	68.3000	25		
26	Anna Mitinian	Costa Rica	66.2000	26		
27	Xera Vegter	South Africa	66.1667	27		
28	Moramay Koomen	Curaçao	64.9667	28		
–	Polina Prikazchikova	Israel	Did not start			
