= Cuba at the 2022 World Aquatics Championships =

- Flag of Cuba
- FINA code: CUB
- National federation: Federación Cubaña de Natación

in Budapest, Hungary
- Competitors: 13 in 3 sports
- Medals: Gold 0 Silver 0 Bronze 0 Total 0

World Aquatics Championships appearances
- 1973; 1975; 1978; 1982; 1986; 1991; 1994; 1998; 2001; 2003; 2005; 2007; 2009; 2011; 2013; 2015; 2017; 2019; 2022; 2023; 2024

Cuba competed at the 2022 World Aquatics Championships in Budapest, Hungary from 18 June to 3 July.

== Artistic swimming ==
Cuba entered 4 artistic swimmers.

Women

| Athlete | Event | Preliminaries | | Final | |
| Athlete | Event | Points | Rank | Points | Rank |
|---|---|---|---|---|---|
| Gabriela Alpajon | Solo technical routine | 68.6361 | 21 | did not advance | |
| Gabriela Alpajon | Solo free routine | 68.3000 | 25 | did not advance | |
| Gabriela Alpajon; Stephany Urbina | Duet technical routine | 66.7595 | 27 | did not advance | |
| Gabriela Alpajon; Stephany Urbina | Duet free routine | 68.5333 | 29 | did not advance | |

Mixed

| Athlete | Event | Preliminaries | | Final | |
| Athlete | Event | Points | Rank | Points | Rank |
|---|---|---|---|---|---|
| Andy Avila; Carelys Valdes | Duet technical routine | 62.6229 | 13 | did not advance | |
| Andy Avila; Carelys Valdes | Duet free routine | 64.5333 | 12 | 64.6333 | 12 |

== Diving ==
Colombia entered 5 divers.

Men

| Athlete | Event | Preliminaries | | Semifinals | | Final | |
| Athlete | Event | Points | Rank | Points | Rank | Points | Rank |
|---|---|---|---|---|---|---|---|
| Luis Cañabate | 10 metre platform | 372.45 | 14 Q | 353.95 | 17 | did not advance | |
| Carlos Escalona | 1 m springboard | 319.90 | 26 | — | | did not advance | |
| Carlos Escalona | 3 m springboard | 366.70 | 17 Q | 327.05 | 16 | did not advance | |
| Johan Morell | 1 m springboard | 300.70 | 33 | — | | did not advance | |
| Johan Morell | 3 m springboard | 281.30 | 45 | did not advance | | | |
| Carlos Ramos | 10 metre platform | 372.20 | 15 Q | 359.30 | 16 | did not advance | |
| Luis Cañabate; Carlos Ramos | Synchronized 10 metre platform | 336.69 | 9 | — | | 371.01 | 6 |

Women

| Athlete | Event | Preliminaries | | Semifinals | | Final | |
| Athlete | Event | Points | Rank | Points | Rank | Points | Rank |
|---|---|---|---|---|---|---|---|
| Anisley García | 10 m platform | 281.10 | 13 Q | 225.90 | 18 | did not advance | |

Mixed

| Athlete | Event | Preliminaries | | Final | |
| Athlete | Event | Points | Rank | Points | Rank |
|---|---|---|---|---|---|
| Anisley García; Luis Cañabate | Team event | — | | 237.55 | 12 |
| Anisley García; Carlos Ramos | Synchronized 10 m platform | — | | 263.91 | 6 |

== Swimming ==
Colombia entered 4 swimmers.

Men

| Athlete | Event | Heat | | Semifinal | | Final | |
| Athlete | Event | Time | Rank | Time | Rank | Time | Rank |
|---|---|---|---|---|---|---|---|
| Julio Calero | 50 m breaststroke | Disqualified | | did not advance | | | |
| Julio Calero | 100 m breaststroke | 1:04.12 | 44 | did not advance | | | |
| Rodolfo Falcón | 800 m freestyle | 8:24.45 | 26 | — | | did not advance | |
| Rodolfo Falcón | 1500 m freestyle | 16:02.43 | 20 | — | | did not advance | |

Women

| Athlete | Event | Heat | | Semifinal | | Final | |
| Athlete | Event | Time | Rank | Time | Rank | Time | Rank |
|---|---|---|---|---|---|---|---|
| Andrea Becali | 100 m backstroke | 1:04.72 | 32 | did not advance | | | |
| Andrea Becali | 200 m backstroke | Disqualified | | did not advance | | | |
| Elisbet Gámez | 200 m freestyle | 2:00.86 | 22 | did not advance | | | |
