= Kazakhstan at the 2022 World Aquatics Championships =

- Flag of Kazakhstan
- FINA code: KAZ
- National federation: Swimming Federation of the Republic of Kazakhstan

in Budapest, Hungary
- Competitors: 49 in 4 sports
- Medals: Gold 0 Silver 0 Bronze 0 Total 0

World Aquatics Championships appearances
- 1994; 1998; 2001; 2003; 2005; 2007; 2009; 2011; 2013; 2015; 2017; 2019; 2022; 2023; 2024

Other related appearances
- Soviet Union (1973–1991)

Kazakhstan competed at the 2022 World Aquatics Championships in Budapest, Hungary from 18 June to 3 July.

== Artistic swimming ==
Kazakhstan entered 14 artistic swimmers.

Women

| Athlete | Event | Preliminaries | | Final | |
| Athlete | Event | Points | Rank | Points | Rank |
|---|---|---|---|---|---|
| Karina Magrupova | Solo technical routine | 80.0042 | 13 | did not advance | |
| Karina Magrupova | Solo free routine | 81.3000 | 12 Q | 82.0667 | 12 |
| Karina Abdulina; Nargiza Bolatova; Eteri Kakutia; Aigerim Kurmangaliyeva; Xeniya Makarova; Anna Pavletsova; Yulia Rogaleva; Yasmin Tuyakova | Team technical routine | 80.3196 | 11 Q | 81.2713 | 11 |
| Nargiza Bolatova; Eteri Kakutia; Aigerim Kurmangaliyeva; Xeniya Makarova; Anna Pavletsova; Yulia Rogaleva; Valeriya Stolbunova; Yasmin Tuyakova | Team free routine | 82.5000 | 11 Q | 83.1667 | 11 |
| Karina Abdulina; Nargiza Bolatova; Eteri Kakutia; Aigerim Kurmangaliyeva; Xeniya Makarova; Anna Pavletsova; Yulia Rogaleva; Valeriya Stolbunova; Yasmin Tuyakova; Zhaniya Zhiyengazy | Free routine combination | 81.1333 | 7 Q | 82.6333 | 7 |
| Karina Abdulina; Nargiza Bolatova; Eteri Kakutia; Aigerim Kurmangaliyeva; Xeniya Makarova; Anna Pavletsova; Arina Pushkina; Yulia Rogaleva; Valeriya Stolbunova; Yasmin Tuyakova | Highlight routine | 83.0333 | 8 Q | 83.7667 | 8 |

Mixed

| Athlete | Event | Preliminaries | | Final | |
| Athlete | Event | Points | Rank | Points | Rank |
|---|---|---|---|---|---|
| Eduard Kim; Zhaklin Yakimova | Duet technical routine | 77.9746 | 7 Q | 79.2599 | 7 |
| Eduard Kim; Zhaklin Yakimova | Duet free routine | 80.3000 | 7 Q | 82.3000 | 7 |

== Open water swimming ==
Kazakhstan entered 4 open water swimmers (2 male and 2 female)

Men

| Athlete | Event | Time | Rank |
|---|---|---|---|
| Lev Cherepanov | 5 km | 59:38.2 | 36 |
| Lev Cherepanov | 10 km | 2:08:15.0 | 51 |
| Vitaliy Khudyakov | 5 km | 59:14.5 | 34 |
| Vitaliy Khudyakov | 25 km | 5:23:10.4 | 20 |

Women

| Athlete | Event | Time | Rank |
|---|---|---|---|
| Xeniya Romanchuk | 5 km | 1:05:22.5 | 40 |
| Xeniya Romanchuk | 10 km | did not finish | |
| Diana Taszhanova | 5 km | 1:03:02.7 | 33 |
| Diana Taszhanova | 10 km | 2:09:40.7 | 36 |

Mixed

| Athlete | Event | Time | Rank |
|---|---|---|---|
| Lev Cherepanov; Xeniya Romanchuk; Diana Taszhanova; Vitaliy Khudyakov | Team | 1:11:09.9 | 16 |

== Swimming ==
Kazakhstan entered 5 swimmers.

Men

| Athlete | Event | Heat | | Semifinal | | Final | |
| Athlete | Event | Time | Rank | Time | Rank | Time | Rank |
|---|---|---|---|---|---|---|---|
| Aibek Kamzenov | 50 m breaststroke | 28.70 | 35 | did not advance | | | |
| Aibek Kamzenov | 100 m breaststroke | 1:03.46 | 41 | did not advance | | | |
| Adilbek Mussin | 50 m butterfly | 23.69 | 26 | did not advance | | | |
| Adilbek Mussin | 100 m butterfly | 53.09 | 32 | did not advance | | | |
| Alexander Varakin | 50 metre freestyle | 22.79 | 46 | did not advance | | | |
| Alexander Varakin | 100 m freestyle | 54.19 | 80 | did not advance | | | |

Women

| Athlete | Event | Heat | | Semifinal | | Final | |
| Athlete | Event | Time | Rank | Time | Rank | Time | Rank |
|---|---|---|---|---|---|---|---|
| Xenia Ignatova | 100 m backstroke | 1:03.92 | 28 | did not advance | | | |
| Xenia Ignatova | 200 m backstroke | 2:17.04 | 18 | did not advance | | | |
| Adelaida Pchelintseva | 50 m breaststroke | 31.75 | 25 | did not advance | | | |
| Adelaida Pchelintseva | 100 m breaststroke | 1:12.40 | 39 | did not advance | | | |

== Water polo ==
Summary

| Team | Event | Group stage | | | | Playoff | Quarterfinal | Semifinal | Final / BM | |
| Team | Event | Opposition Score | Opposition Score | Opposition Score | Rank | Opposition Score | Opposition Score | Opposition Score | Opposition Score | Rank |
|---|---|---|---|---|---|---|---|---|---|---|
| Kazakhstan | Men's tournament | Australia; L 4–10 | United States; L 4–17 | Serbia; L 3–22 | 4 | — | — | — | Germany; L 7–16 | 14 |
| Kazakhstan | Women's tournament | Australia; L 6–19 | Brazil; W 10–6 | New Zealand; L 11–15 | 3 P/off | Spain; L 1–14 | — | Canada; L 11–19 | Argentina; W 12–6 | 11 |

=== Men's tournament ===
Team roster

The following is Kazakh roster in the Water polo at the 2022 World Aquatics Championships – Men's tournament.

Head coach: Rustam Ukumanov

- 1 Madikhan Makhmetov GK
- 2 Eduard Tsoy FP
- 3 Anatoliy Pustovalov FP
- 4 Srđan Vuksanović FP
- 5 Maxim Lamayev FP
- 6 Danil Artyukh FP
- 7 Murat Shakenov FP
- 8 Yegor Berbelyuk FP
- 9 Ruslan Akhmetov FP
- 10 Alexey Shmider FP
- 11 Timur Khassanov FP
- 12 Sultan Shonzhigitov FP
- 13 Pavel Lipilin GK

Group play

| Pos | Team | Pld | W | D | L | GF | GA | GD | Pts | Qualification |
|---|---|---|---|---|---|---|---|---|---|---|
| 1 | Serbia | 3 | 3 | 0 | 0 | 45 | 21 | +24 | 6 | Quarterfinals |
| 2 | United States | 3 | 2 | 0 | 1 | 44 | 30 | +14 | 4 | Playoffs |
| 3 | Australia | 3 | 1 | 0 | 2 | 24 | 24 | 0 | 2 | Playoffs |
| 4 | Kazakhstan | 3 | 0 | 0 | 3 | 11 | 49 | −38 | 0 | |

Source: Sportresult
Rules for classification: 1) points; 2) head-to-head points; 3) head-to-head goal difference; 4) head-to-head number of goals scored; 5) Goal difference.

| 21 June 2022; 18:00 | Report | Australia | 10–4 | Kazakhstan | Szeged Tiszavirág Pool, Szeged; Referees: Levan Berishvili (GEO), Veselin Mišković (MNE) |
| 21 June 2022; 18:00 | Report | Score by quarters: 1–0, 3–0, 3–2, 3–2 | | | Szeged Tiszavirág Pool, Szeged; Referees: Levan Berishvili (GEO), Veselin Mišković (MNE) |
| 21 June 2022; 18:00 | Report | Pavillard, Power 3 | Goals | Shmider 3 | Szeged Tiszavirág Pool, Szeged; Referees: Levan Berishvili (GEO), Veselin Mišković (MNE) |

| 23 June 2022; 19:30 | Report | Kazakhstan | 4–17 | United States | Szeged Tiszavirág Pool, Szeged; Referees: Levan Berishvili (GEO), Veselin Mišković (MNE) |
| 23 June 2022; 19:30 | Report | Score by quarters: 1–7, 2–3, 1–2, 0–5 | | | Szeged Tiszavirág Pool, Szeged; Referees: Levan Berishvili (GEO), Veselin Mišković (MNE) |
| 23 June 2022; 19:30 | Report | Shakenov 2 | Goals | Irving 4 | Szeged Tiszavirág Pool, Szeged; Referees: Levan Berishvili (GEO), Veselin Mišković (MNE) |

| 25 June 2022; 18:00 | Report | Kazakhstan | 3–22 | Serbia | Szeged Tiszavirág Pool, Szeged; Referees: Raffaele Colombo (ITA), Fabio Toffoli (BRA) |
| 25 June 2022; 18:00 | Report | Score by quarters: 0–4, 1–8, 0–5, 2–5 | | | Szeged Tiszavirág Pool, Szeged; Referees: Raffaele Colombo (ITA), Fabio Toffoli (BRA) |
| 25 June 2022; 18:00 | Report | Vuksanović 3 | Goals | S. Rašović 6 | Szeged Tiszavirág Pool, Szeged; Referees: Raffaele Colombo (ITA), Fabio Toffoli (BRA) |

13th place game

| 29 June 2022; 15:30 | Report | Germany | 16–7 | Kazakhstan | Szeged Tiszavirág Pool, Szeged; Referees: Levan Berishvili (GEO), Agustin Pinski (ARG) |
| 29 June 2022; 15:30 | Report | Score by quarters: 4–2, 4–2, 3–1, 5–2 | | | Szeged Tiszavirág Pool, Szeged; Referees: Levan Berishvili (GEO), Agustin Pinski (ARG) |
| 29 June 2022; 15:30 | Report | Küppers 4 | Goals | Shakenov 3 | Szeged Tiszavirág Pool, Szeged; Referees: Levan Berishvili (GEO), Agustin Pinski (ARG) |

=== Women's tournament ===
Team roster

The following is Kazakhstani roster in the Water polo at the 2022 World Aquatics Championships – Women's tournament.

Head coach: Marat Naurazbekov

- 1 Alexandra Zharkimbayeva GK
- 2 Darya Pochinok CB
- 3 Valeriya Anossova D
- 4 Anna Turova CB
- 5 Anastassiya Yeremina CB
- 6 Darya Roga D
- 7 Anna Novikova D
- 8 Darya Muravyeva CF
- 9 Nadezhda Shapovalova D
- 10 Viktoriya Khritankova D
- 11 Anastassiya Mirshina CF
- 12 Anastassiya Murataliyeva D
- 13 Mariya Martynenko GK

Group play

| Pos | Team | Pld | W | D | L | GF | GA | GD | Pts | Qualification |
|---|---|---|---|---|---|---|---|---|---|---|
| 1 | Australia | 3 | 3 | 0 | 0 | 47 | 13 | +34 | 6 | Quarterfinals |
| 2 | New Zealand | 3 | 2 | 0 | 1 | 29 | 30 | −1 | 4 | Playoffs |
| 3 | Kazakhstan | 3 | 1 | 0 | 2 | 27 | 40 | −13 | 2 | Playoffs |
| 4 | Brazil | 3 | 0 | 0 | 3 | 19 | 39 | −20 | 0 | |

Source: Sportresult
Rules for classification: 1) points; 2) head-to-head points; 3) head-to-head goal difference; 4) head-to-head number of goals scored; 5) Goal difference.

| 20 June 2022; 19:30 | Report | Kazakhstan | 6–19 | Australia | Sopron Lőver Pool, Sopron; Referees: György Kun (HUN), Chisato Kurosaki (JPN) |
| 20 June 2022; 19:30 | Report | Score by quarters: 1–6, 1–9, 3–3, 1–1 | | | Sopron Lőver Pool, Sopron; Referees: György Kun (HUN), Chisato Kurosaki (JPN) |
| 20 June 2022; 19:30 | Report | Yeremina 3 | Goals | Arancini 5 | Sopron Lőver Pool, Sopron; Referees: György Kun (HUN), Chisato Kurosaki (JPN) |

| 22 June 2022; 19:30 | Report | Brazil | 6–10 | Kazakhstan | Sopron Lőver Pool, Sopron; Referees: Radu Matache (ROU), Georgios Stavridis (GRE) |
| 22 June 2022; 19:30 | Report | Score by quarters: 2–3, 2–2, 1–1, 1–4 | | | Sopron Lőver Pool, Sopron; Referees: Radu Matache (ROU), Georgios Stavridis (GRE) |
| 22 June 2022; 19:30 | Report | Coutinho 2 | Goals | Turova, Yeremina 3 | Sopron Lőver Pool, Sopron; Referees: Radu Matache (ROU), Georgios Stavridis (GRE) |

| 24 June 2022; 19:30 | Report | Kazakhstan | 11–15 | New Zealand | Sopron Lőver Pool, Sopron; Referees: Maro Savinović (CRO), Agustin Pinski (ARG) |
| 24 June 2022; 19:30 | Report | Score by quarters: 3–4, 5–2, 2–5, 1–4 | | | Sopron Lőver Pool, Sopron; Referees: Maro Savinović (CRO), Agustin Pinski (ARG) |
| 24 June 2022; 19:30 | Report | Muravyeva 3 | Goals | Josephson 4 | Sopron Lőver Pool, Sopron; Referees: Maro Savinović (CRO), Agustin Pinski (ARG) |

Playoffs

| 26 June 2022; 17:00 | Report | Kazakhstan | 1–14 | Spain | Alfréd Hajós National Swimming Stadium, Budapest; Referees: Helene Painchaud (CAN), Harvey Hinds (CUR) |
| 26 June 2022; 17:00 | Report | Score by quarters: 0–4, 1–2, 0–7, 0–1 | | | Alfréd Hajós National Swimming Stadium, Budapest; Referees: Helene Painchaud (CAN), Harvey Hinds (CUR) |
| 26 June 2022; 17:00 | Report | Turova 1 | Goals | Ortiz 4 | Alfréd Hajós National Swimming Stadium, Budapest; Referees: Helene Painchaud (CAN), Harvey Hinds (CUR) |

9–12th place semifinals

| 28 June 2022; 18:30 | Report | Canada | 19–11 | Kazakhstan | Szeged Tiszavirag Pool, Szeged; Referees: Ivan Raković (SRB), Fabio Toffoli (BRA) |
| 28 June 2022; 18:30 | Report | Score by quarters: 3–2, 6–3, 5–3, 5–3 | | | Szeged Tiszavirag Pool, Szeged; Referees: Ivan Raković (SRB), Fabio Toffoli (BRA) |
| 28 June 2022; 18:30 | Report | three players 4 | Goals | Yeremina 3 | Szeged Tiszavirag Pool, Szeged; Referees: Ivan Raković (SRB), Fabio Toffoli (BRA) |

Eleventh place game

| 30 June 2022; 17:00 | Report | Argentina | 6–12 | Kazakhstan | Szeged Tiszavirag Pool, Szeged; Referees: Levan Berishvili (GEO), Edgar Baron (COL) |
| 30 June 2022; 17:00 | Report | Score by quarters: 2–4, 1–3, 1–3, 2–2 | | | Szeged Tiszavirag Pool, Szeged; Referees: Levan Berishvili (GEO), Edgar Baron (COL) |
| 30 June 2022; 17:00 | Report | Leonard 3 | Goals | Roga 5 | Szeged Tiszavirag Pool, Szeged; Referees: Levan Berishvili (GEO), Edgar Baron (COL) |
