= Hiroki Ito (diver) =

Japanese diver (born 1999)

Personal information
- Nationality: Japanese
- Born: 26 October 1999 (age 26) Zama, Japan

Sport
- Sport: Diving
Medal record
World Championships
Bronze medal – third place	2023 Fukuoka	10 m mixed synchro

Hiroki Ito (伊藤洸輝, Itō Hiroki, born 26 October 1999) is a Japanese diver. He competed in the 2020 Summer Olympics.
