= Javier Ruisanchez =

Puerto Rican swimmer (born 1997)

Personal information
- Full name: Javier Enrique Ruisanchez Torres Zayas
- Born: 8 February 1997 (age 29) San Juan, Puerto Rico

Sport
- Country: Puerto Rico
- Sport: Artistic swimming, pool swimming (former)
- Event(s): Solo technical routine, Solo free routine, Mixed duet technical routine, Mixed duet free routine
- College team: Gannon University (pool swimming)
- Partner: Nicolle Torrens
- Coached by: Julia Toro
Medal record
Men's artistic swimming
Representing Puerto Rico
Event	1st	2nd	3rd
Artistic Swimming World Series	1	2	6
Total	1	2	6
Artistic Swimming World Series
Gold medal – first place	2022 USA-CAN	Solo free routine
Silver medal – second place	2022 Paris	Solo technical routine
Silver medal – second place	2022 Australia	Solo free routine
Bronze medal – third place	2021 Canada	Mixed duet technical routine
Bronze medal – third place	2022 USA-CAN	Solo technical routine
Bronze medal – third place	2022 USA-CAN	Mixed duet technical routine
Bronze medal – third place	2022 USA-CAN	Mixed duet free routine
Bronze medal – third place	2022 Paris	Solo free routine
Bronze medal – third place	2022 Australia	Solo technical routine

Javier Enrique Ruisanchez Torres Zayas (born 8 February 1997) is a Puerto Rican artistic swimmer and former pool swimmer. He is a nine-time medalist at the FINA Artistic Swimming World Series, winning eight medals at the 2022 FINA Artistic Swimming World Series. At the 2022 World Aquatics Championships, he and his partner Nicolle Torrens became the first artistic swimmers representing Puerto Rico to qualify for, and compete in, a final of a mixed gender duet event at a FINA World Aquatics Championships, finishing eleventh in the mixed duet free routine and twelfth in the mixed duet technical routine.

== Background ==
Ruisanchez was born 8 February 1997, in San Juan, Puerto Rico. He was raised in Puerto Rico and later moved to the United States, graduating from West Springfield High School in Virginia. Growing up, he was a competitive pool swimmer, specializing in freestyle, butterfly, and individual medley events, and he later competed collegiately in the NCAA for Gannon University. In 2021, he transitioned from pool swimming to artistic swimming, combining and channeling his dance experience in ballet and competition experience in pool swimming into one sport, in which he competes with partner Nicolle Torrens and is coached by Julia Toro.

== Career ==
=== 2021 Artistic Swimming World Series ===
At the fourth leg of the 2021 FINA Artistic Swimming World Series, a virtual event hosted by Canada in May, Ruisanchez and his partner in the mixed duet technical routine, Nicolle Torrens, won the bronze medal in the event, choreographing their routine to music by Lebanese musical artist Emad Sayyah in the theme of "Arabian Royalty".

=== 2022 Artistic Swimming World Series ===
On the first leg of the 2022 FINA Artistic Swimming World Series, a virtual format competition hosted by Canada and the United States in March, he won two medals on the first of two days, the first was a bronze medal in the male solo technical routine with choreography in the theme of "Black Swan" and a score of 53.7147 points and the second was a bronze medal with partner Nicolle Torrens in the mixed duet technical routine with a score of 64.1346 points. The second of two days, he won an additional two medals, including the gold medal in the solo free routine, with a score of 60.2000 points and choreography to the song "Fire on Fire" by English musical artist Sam Smith, and a bronze medal in the mixed duet free routine, scoring within 20 points of silver medalists Tomoka Sato and Yotaro Sato of Japan.

The second leg of the World Series, which took place in April at Piscine Georges Vallerey in Paris, France, Ruisanchez won the bronze medal in the solo technical routine with a score of 65.6333 points and the silver medal in the solo free routine with a score of 60.8774 points. For the following leg, another virtual format event this time hosted by Australia for the first time in early May, he won a bronze medal on day one in the solo technical routine with a score of 57.9860 points. The next day, in the solo free routine, he scored within 15 points of gold medalist Gustavo Sánchez of Colombia to win the silver medal with a final mark of 62.5333 points.

At the final leg of the World Series, called the Super Final and held in mid-May at Athens Olympic Sports Complex in Athens, Greece, Ruisanchez was the only Latin American athlete to qualify to compete. As part of competition, he placed fourth in both the solo technical routine and the solo free routine.

=== 2022 World Aquatics Championships ===
Day two of artistic swimming competition at the 2022 World Aquatics Championships, held in Budapest, Hungary, Ruisanchez and his partner Nicolle Torrens scored 65.5330 points in the preliminaries of the mixed duet technical routine accomplishing a historic feat for Puerto Rico by becoming the first artistic swimmers representing the nation at a FINA World Aquatics Championships to qualify for the final of a mixed gender artistic swimming event with their eleventh-rank performance, which advanced them to the final of the event two days later on 20 June. With a score of 65.8801 points in the final, they placed twelfth. The eighth day, they achieved a mark of 66.4000 points in the preliminaries of the mixed duet free routine, which advanced them to their second final in eleventh-rank. They finished with another historic feat for Puerto Rico, earning 65.7000 points in the final of the mixed duet free routine to place eleventh and mark the first time in history the nation had artistic swimmers place in the final of two artistic swimming events at a single World Aquatics Championships.

=== 2023 Artistic Swimming World Cup ===
In the mixed duet technical routine at the first stop of the inaugural Artistic Swimming World Cup, held in March 2023 in Markham, Canada, Ruisanchez achieved a final mark of 119.1250 points with his partner Nicolle Torrens, ranking seventh out of all competing duos and sixth out of all competing nations, Spain had two duos compete.

== International championships ==
Meet	mixed duet technical routine	mixed duet free routine
WC 2022	12th (65.8801)	11th (65.7000)

== Artistic Swimming World Series circuits ==
The following medals Ruisanchez has won at Artistic Swimming World Series circuits.

Edition	Gold medals	Silver medals	Bronze medals	Total
2021	0	0	1	1
2022	1	2	5	8
Total	1	2	6	9

== Awards and honors ==
- Puerto Rico Olympic Committee, Federation Sporting Excellence (artistic swimming): 2022

== Personal life ==
Ruisanchez came out publicly as gay in October 2013 via social media platform Twitter during high school when he was 16 years old.

== See also ==
- Puerto Rico at the 2022 World Aquatics Championships
- 2022 FINA Artistic Swimming World Series
