= Tomoka Sato =

Japanese artistic swimmer (born 2001)

Personal information
- Nationality: Japanese
- Born: 22 August 2001 (age 25) Tsukuba, Japan

Sport
- Country: Japan
- Sport: Artistic swimming
- Partner: Yotaro Sato
Medal record
Women's artistic swimming
Representing Japan
World Championships
Gold medal – first place	2023 Fukuoka	Mixed duet technical routine
Silver medal – second place	2022 Budapest	Mixed duet technical routine
Silver medal – second place	2022 Budapest	Mixed duet free routine
Silver medal – second place	2022 Budapest	Team technical routine
Silver medal – second place	2024 Doha	Team free routine
Silver medal – second place	2025 Singapore	Team free routine
Bronze medal – third place	2022 Budapest	Team free routine
Bronze medal – third place	2023 Fukuoka	Team acrobatic routine
Bronze medal – third place	2024 Doha	Team technical routine
Asian Games
Silver medal – second place	2022 Hangzhou	Team routine
Silver medal – second place	2026 Aichi–Nagoya	Duet routine
Silver medal – second place	2026 Aichi–Nagoya	Team routine
World Junior Championships
Bronze medal – third place	2018 Budapest	Team technical routine
Bronze medal – third place	2018 Budapest	Team free routine
Bronze medal – third place	2018 Budapest	Team free combination

Tomoka Sato (佐藤 友花, born 22 August 2001) is a Japanese artistic swimmer. At the 2022 World Aquatics Championships, she and her younger brother Yotaro Sato became the first duo representing Japan to win a silver medal in the mixed duet technical routine, they also became the first representing Japan to win a silver medal in the mixed duet free routine. She also won a silver in the team technical routine and a bronze medal in the team free routine at the same Championships. Earlier in the year, she won a gold medal in the mixed duet technical routine and a gold medal and a silver medal in the mixed duet free routine as part of the 2022 FINA Artistic Swimming World Series. At the 2018 World Junior Artistic Swimming Championships, she won three bronze medals in team events.

== Background ==
Sato has a younger brother, Yotaro Sato, who competes as her partner in mixed duet artistic swimming events.

== Career ==
=== 2018–2021 ===
At the 2018 World Junior Artistic Swimming Championships, held in July in Budapest, Hungary, Sato won a bronze medal in the team technical routine with a team score of 89.0176 points, a bronze medal in the team free routine with a final score of 90.5667 points, and a bronze medal in the team free combination with a score of 90.5333 points, finishing behind the teams from Russia, who won the gold medals in all three events, and Ukraine, who won the silver medals in all three events, in each event. The following year, she won a silver medal in the team free combination at the eighth leg the 2019 Artistic Swimming World Series, held mid-year in Barcelona, Spain, helping achieve a final mark of 87.5668 points to place behind the team from Ukraine and head of the team from Spain. Two years later, she won silver medals in the team technical routine, with a score of 91.4460 points, and the team free routine, with a score of 93.1667 points, at the third leg of the 2021 Artistic Swimming World Series, hosted by Russia at the Palace of Water Sports in Kazan in April, finishing only behind the team from Russia in each event.

=== 2022 ===
==== 2022 Artistic Swimming World Series ====
On the first leg of the 2022 FINA Artistic Swimming World Series, hosted jointly by Canada and the United States as a virtual event in March, Sato and her partner, younger brother Yotaro Sato, scored 82.7000 points in the mixed duet free routine to win the silver medal behind gold medalists Olesia Platonova and Aleksandr Maltsev of Russia, who competed as FINA independent athletes, and ahead of bronze medalists Nicolle Torrens and Javier Ruisanchez of Puerto Rico. For the fourth leg of the World Series, a virtual event hosted by Australia in May, she and her brother won the gold medal in the mixed duet technical routine, narrowly outscoring the silver medalists in the event, Emma García and Pau Ribes of Spain, by less than one point with their final mark of 83.5156 points. In their second event, the mixed duet free routine, Sato and her brother won another gold medal, this time scoring 83.2667 points and finishing over one point ahead of the silver medalists, Claudia Coletti and Kenneth Gaudet of the United States.

==== 2022 World Aquatics Championships ====
2022 World Championships
Silver medal – second place	mixed duet technical routine	86.5939
Silver medal – second place	team technical routine	92.2261
Silver medal – second place	mixed duet free routine	89.7333
Bronze medal – third place	team free routine	93.1333

Day four of the 2022 World Aquatics Championships, with artistic swimming contested in June in Budapest, Hungary, Sato won her first medal of the Championships, a silver medal in the mixed duet technical routine with her brother Yotaro Sato and a final score of 86.5939 points, which was also marked the first time a duo representing Japan had ever won a silver medal in any mixed gender event at a FINA World Aquatics Championships. The following day, she won a silver medal in the team technical routine, scoring 92.2261 points to finish less than two points ahead of the bronze medal team from Italy and less than three points behind the gold medal team from China.

Three days later, Sato helped achieve a final mark of 93.1333 points in the team free routine to win the bronze medal, placing behind the gold medal team from China and the silver medal team from Ukraine. The ninth and final day of artistic swimming competition, she and her brother won a first silver medal for Japan in the mixed duet free routine, finishing 1.2334 points behind Lucrezia Ruggiero and Giorgio Minisini of Italy and 1.3333 points ahead of Haoyu Shi and Yiyao Zhang of China with their score of 89.7333 points. The Sato siblings choreographed their free routine to music by Niconi Commons in the theme of "Samurai".

=== 2023 ===
==== 2023 Artistic Swimming World Cup ====
At the inaugural Artistic Swimming World Cup conducted by World Aquatics, starting in March 2023 in Markham, Canada, Sato won a gold medal on day one in the mixed team technical event, helping achieve a final mark of 281.8896 points. Two days later, she won a silver medal in the mixed team acrobatic, where the Japan team of eight scored a total of 223.6875 points (artistic impression 89.4000 points, execution 134.2875 points, total difficulty 15.5500 points).

== International championships ==
Meet	mixed duet technical routine	mixed duet free routine	team technical routine	team free routine	team free combination
Junior level
WJC 2018			(bronze) (89.0176)	(bronze) (90.5667)	(bronze) (90.5333)
Senior level
WC 2022	(silver) (86.5939)	(silver) (89.7333)	(silver) (92.2261)	(bronze) (93.1333)	

== World series and world cup circuits ==
The following medals Sato has won at Artistic Swimming World Series (through 2022) and Artistic Swimming World Cup (2023) circuits.

Edition	Gold medals	Silver medals	Bronze medals	Total
2019	0	1	0	1
2021	0	2	0	2
2022	2	1	0	3
2023	1	1	0	2
Total	3	5	0	8

== See also ==
- Japan at the 2022 World Aquatics Championships
- Japan at the 2023 World Aquatics Championships
- 2022 FINA Artistic Swimming World Series
