= Gustavo Sánchez (artistic swimmer) =

Colombian artistic swimmer (born 2000)

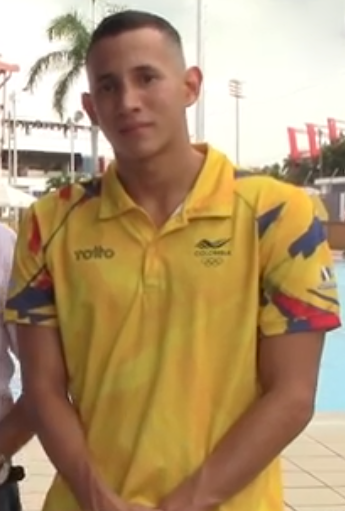
- In a 2023 interview

Personal information
- Full name: Gustavo Adolfo Sánchez
- Born: 31 August 2000 (age 26) Cali, Colombia

Sport
- Country: Colombia
- Sport: Artistic swimming
- Events: Solo free routine; Solo technical routine; Mixed duet free routine; Mixed duet technical routine; Highlight routine
- Partner: Jennifer Cerquera Hatiusca
Medal record
Representing Colombia
Men's artistic swimming
Event	1st	2nd	3rd
World Championships	0	1	2
World Cup	3	8	13
World Series	2	0	1
CAC Games	5	5	0
South American Games	0	1	1
South American Championships	3	2	0
Bolivarian Games	1	0	0
Total	14	17	17
World Championships
Silver medal – second place	2023 Fukuoka	Solo free
Bronze medal – third place	2024 Doha	Solo free
Bronze medal – third place	2024 Doha	Solo technical
World Cup (Super Final)
Gold medal – first place	2024 Budapest	Solo free
Silver medal – second place	2023 Oviedo	Mixed duet technical
Silver medal – second place	2024 Budapest	Mixed duet free
Bronze medal – third place	2023 Oviedo	Solo technical
Bronze medal – third place	2023 Oviedo	Mixed duet free
Bronze medal – third place	2025 Xian	Solo free
Central American and Caribbean Games
Gold medal – first place	2023 San Salvador	Highlight
Gold medal – first place	2023 San Salvador	Mixed duet technical
Gold medal – first place	2026 Santo Domingo	Solo free
Gold medal – first place	2026 Santo Domingo	Solo technical
Gold medal – first place	2026 Santo Domingo	Mixed duet free
Silver medal – second place	2023 San Salvador	Mixed duet free
Silver medal – second place	2026 Santo Domingo	Mixed duet technical
Silver medal – second place	2026 Santo Domingo	Mixed team free
Silver medal – second place	2026 Santo Domingo	Mixed team technical
Silver medal – second place	2026 Santo Domingo	Team acrobatic
South American Games
Silver medal – second place	2026 Santa Fe	Mixed team
Bronze medal – third place	2026 Santa Fe	Mixed duet
South American Championships
Gold medal – first place	2021 Buenos Aires	Mixed duet
Gold medal – first place	2024 Cali	Mixed duet technical
Gold medal – first place	2024 Cali	Team acrobatic
Silver medal – second place	2024 Cali	Solo free
Silver medal – second place	2024 Cali	Solo technical
Bolivarian Games
Gold medal – first place	2022 Valledupar	Mixed duet

Gustavo Adolfo Sánchez (born 2000) is a Colombian artistic swimmer. He won two gold medals in the solo free routine at the 2022 Artistic Swimming World Series as well as a bronze medal in the mixed duet technical routine. His gold medal in the solo free routine at the Paris stop of the 2022 World Series marked the first gold medal won by an artistic swimmer representing Colombia at a FINA Artistic Swimming World Series. He is a 2022 Bolivarian Games champion in the mixed duet routine. At World Aquatic Championships, he placed sixth in the mixed duet technical routine in 2022 and eighth in 2019, as well as sixth in the mixed duet free routine in 2022 and eighth in 2019.

== Background ==
Sánchez was born 31 August 2000 in Cali, Colombia. He dreams that one day the Olympic Games will include men in artistic swimming, which has been omitted from the Olympic program in both men-only and mixed gender duet events as least through the 2024 Summer Olympics. He was unaffected by the allowance of up to two men to compete in the team event (featuring eight team event members) at the 2024 Olympic Games as the International Olympic Committee also continued barring the entrance of men in the sport in solo and duet events. For his collegiate studies, he attends Javeriana University in Cali, where he studies visual communication design.

== Career ==
=== 2019 World Aquatics Championships ===
On the second day of the 2019 World Aquatics Championships in Gwangju, South Korea in July, Sánchez and his partner Jennifer Cerquera Hatiusca ranked eighth in the preliminaries of the mixed duet technical routine, qualifying for the final two days later with a score of 76.1453 that included a minus 1.0 penalty incurred during the performance. In the final, they placed eighth with a score of 77.5388 points, penalty free. Day eight of competition, he and Cerquera Hatiusca qualified for the final of the mixed duet free routine, with a score of 78.5667 points in the preliminaries. For the final the following day, the duo placed eighth, scoring 78.7000 points with no penalty.

=== 2022 ===
==== 2022 Artistic Swimming World Series ====
On the second day of competition for the second leg of the 2022 FINA Artistic Swimming World Series, held in April at Piscine Georges Vallerey in Paris, France, Sánchez won the gold medal in the solo free routine with a score of 80.8667 points for his performance choreographed in the theme of "The Joker". This was the first-ever gold medal at a FINA Artistic Swimming World Series won by an artistic swimmer representing Colombia. The third and final day, he started off with a bronze medal-winning performance in the mixed duet technical routine with his partner Jennifer Cerquera Hatiusca, performing to the song "Age of Gods" by Thomas Bergersen with a theme of "Constellations" to score 77.7850 points. He finished the day off in the mixed duet free routine with the same partner, placing fourth with a score of 80.2667 points.

In his first event of the fourth leg of the World Series, hosted in a virtual format by Australia in May, he and Cerquera Hatiusca placed fifth with a score of 75.3905 points, finishing less than four points behind the bronze medal-winning duo representing Kazakhstan. For his second event, he competed in the solo free routine, performing his "The Joker" theme choreography to win the gold medal with a score of 77.4667 points and outscoring the silver medalist Javier Ruisanchez of Puerto Rico by over 14 points. The final event he competed in for the World Series was the mixed duet free routine on the fourth leg of the World Series, where he and Cerquera Hatiusca scored 77.3667 points and placed fifth.

==== 2022 World Aquatics Championships ====
Sánchez entered to compete in 100% of events open to men, two mixed gender events, in artistic swimming competition at the 2022 World Aquatics Championships in Budapest, Hungary, with his partner Jennifer Cerquera Hatiusca. On the second day of competition, 18 June, he and his partner achieved their highest rank finish in a preliminary or final at a FINA World Aquatics Championships ever, qualifying for the final and ranking sixth in the preliminaries of the mixed duet technical routine with a score of 78.5003 points. In the final, he and his partner improved their marks by over two full points and achieved a sixth-place finish with a score of 81.2272 points, which was their highest place finish and highest score in a final at a FINA World Aquatics Championships in any mixed duet event. For their second of two events, the mixed duet free routine, they achieved a new personal best score at a World Championships of 81.4667 points, ranked sixth overall, and qualified for the final. They further improved their personal best score in the final, placing sixth with a score of 83.0667 points.

==== 2022 Bolivarian Games ====
2022 Bolivarian Games
Gold medal – first place	mixed duet routine	78.350

At the 2022 Bolivarian Games, held in Valledupar less than a week after the conclusion of artistic swimming competition at the World Championships, Sánchez won a gold medal in the mixed duet routine, scoring 75.943 points for the technical competency and 78.350 for the free competency.

== International championships ==
Meet	Solo technical routine	Solo free routine	Mixed duet technical routine	Mixed duet free routine	Mixed duet routine	Highlight routine	Mixed team technical routine	Mixed team free routine	Team acrobatic	Team routine
WC 2019	—N/a	—N/a	8th (77.5388)	8th (78.7000)	—N/a		—N/a	—N/a	—N/a	—N/a
SAC 2021	—N/a	—N/a	1st (75.7376)	1st (80.5167)	(gold) (156.2543)		—N/a	—N/a	—N/a	
WC 2022	—N/a	—N/a	6th (81.2272)	6th (83.0667)	—N/a		—N/a	—N/a	—N/a	—N/a
BvG 2022	—N/a	—N/a	1st (75.943)	1st (78.350)	(gold) (154.2930)	—N/a	—N/a	—N/a	—N/a	
CAC 2023	—N/a	—N/a	(gold) (217.8867)	(silver) (154.7958)	—N/a	(gold) (185.4800)	—N/a	—N/a	—N/a	—N/a
WC 2023	4th (204.8617)	(silver) (189.9625)	6th (210.1833)	4th (170.2208)	—N/a	—N/a				—N/a
PAG 2023	—N/a	—N/a	—N/a	—N/a	—N/a	—N/a	5th (204.1163)	5th (191.7229)	6th (179.1933)	6th (575.0325)
WC 2024	(bronze) (231.0000)	(bronze) (192.0812)	8th (197.3592)	4th (191.8729)	—N/a	—N/a				—N/a
WC 2025	7th (225.1908)	7th (198.9025)	12th (170.9792)	5th (282.9484)	—N/a	—N/a				—N/a
CAC 2026	(gold) (227.6908)	(gold) (243.6738)	(silver) (214.0683)	(gold) (251.2784)	—N/a	—N/a	(silver) (235.3117)	(silver) (222.6148)	(silver) (175.3367)	—N/a

== World series and world cup circuits ==
The following medals Sánchez has won at Artistic Swimming World Series (through 2022) and Artistic Swimming World Cup (2023–2026) circuits.

Edition	Gold medals	Silver medals	Bronze medals	Total
2022	2	0	1	3
2023	0	4	7	11
2024	3	2	0	5
2025	0	0	4	4
2026	0	2	2	4
Total	5	8	14	27

== See also ==
- Colombia at the 2019 World Aquatics Championships
- 2022 FINA Artistic Swimming World Series
