= Akane Yanagisawa =

Japanese synchronized swimmer

Personal information
- National team: Japan
- Born: 8 October 1998 (age 27) Saitama Prefecture, Japan

Sport
- Sport: Swimming
- Strokes: Synchronized swimming
Medal record
World Championships
| Silver medal – second place | 2022 Budapest | Free routine combination |
| Silver medal – second place | 2022 Budapest | Team technical routine |
| Silver medal – second place | 2023 Fukuoka | Team free routine |
| Silver medal – second place | 2024 Doha | Team free routine |
| Bronze medal – third place | 2022 Budapest | Team free routine |
| Bronze medal – third place | 2023 Fukuoka | Team acrobatic routine |

Akane Yanagisawa (栁澤 明希, Yanagisawa Akane; born 8 October 1998) is a Japanese competitor in synchronized swimming. She qualified for the 2020 Summer Olympics held in Tokyo, in the team event.

She competed in the 2019 FINA World Championships.

Yanagisawa has also participated in several World Championships. In 2019, she won silver medals in both the women’s team free routine and the women’s free routine combination. In 2022, she continued to excel, securing silver in the women’s team technical routine and free combination, and a bronze in the women’s team free routine (InsideSynchro). In 2023, she earned a silver medal in the women’s team event at the Asian Games, along with additional silver and bronze medals at the World Championships. She also claimed gold and silver medals at World Cup events in Markham and Montpellier (InsideSynchro). As of 2024, Yanagisawa has accumulated 23 medals in major international competitions, including 10 gold, 11 silver, and 2 bronze (World Aquatics). Born in Saitama Prefecture, Japan, she began her athletic career in swimming before transitioning to synchronized swimming.
