= Ayano Shimada =

Japanese artistic swimmer

Personal information
- Native name: 島田 綾乃
- Nationality: Japanese
- Born: June 22, 2006 (age 20) Mie Prefecture, Japan
- Education: Ritsumeikan University

Sport
- Sport: Artistic swimming
- Club: Mie A.S.C.
Medal record
Representing Japan
Artistic swimming
Asian Games
Silver medal – second place	2026 Aichi–Nagoya	Mixed team
Silver medal – second place	2023 Hangzhou	Team acrobatic
World Aquatics Championships
Silver medal – second place	2023 Fukuoka	Team free
Bronze medal – third place	2024 Doha	Team technical

Ayano Shimada (Japanese: 島田 綾乃; born 22 June 2006) is a Japanese artistic swimmer. She has represented Japan at the World Aquatics Championships, the Summer Olympics and the Asian Games. Her international achievements include silver medals at the 2023 and 2026 Asian Games, as well as medals at the World Aquatics Championships and the World Aquatics Artistic Swimming World Cup. She is a student at Ritsumeikan University and is affiliated with Mie A.S.C.

== Career ==
Shimada was born on 22 June 2006 in Mie Prefecture, Japan. She attended Suzuka High School and trained with Mie A.S.C. before pursuing her university studies at Ritsumeikan University. She became involved in international competition as a junior athlete and was selected to represent Japan at the World Junior Artistic Swimming Championships.

At the 2019 World Youth Artistic Swimming Championships, Shimada competed in the women's solo figures and team events. She continued to develop as an international competitor and was part of the Japanese team at the 2022 World Junior Artistic Swimming Championships in Quebec City, Canada. At that competition, she won gold medals in the women's team technical routine, team free combination and mixed duet technical and free routines, as well as a silver medal in the women's team free routine.

Shimada made further progress at senior international level in 2023. At the World Aquatics Artistic Swimming World Cup in Montpellier, France, she won a silver medal in the team technical event. She also earned a silver medal in the team free event at the 2023 World Aquatics Championships in Fukuoka, Japan. Later that year, she represented Japan at the 2022 Asian Games, held in Hangzhou in 2023, and won silver in the team acrobatic event.

In 2024, Shimada continued competing for Japan on the international circuit. At the World Aquatics Championships in Doha, Qatar, she won bronze in the team technical event. She also appeared in the artistic swimming competition at the 2024 Summer Olympics in Paris, where Japan competed in the team event.

After entering Ritsumeikan University, Shimada competed in Japanese university artistic swimming events. At the 2025 Japan Intercollegiate Swimming Championships, she won the women's solo event and finished second in the duet with Natsuha Taneda. In May 2025, the pair had also won the duet technical routine at the Japan Artistic Swimming Championships.

Shimada continued to earn medals in international World Cup competitions in 2026. She won gold in the team free event at the World Aquatics Artistic Swimming World Cup stop in Toronto, Canada, and silver in the team acrobatic event at the same stop. These results added to her international medal record ahead of the Asian Games.

At the 102nd Japan Intercollegiate Swimming Championships in August 2026, Shimada and Taneda won the women's duet with a combined score of 256.8788 points. Shimada also represented Japan at the 2026 Asian Games in Aichi and Nagoya. She was a member of the Japanese national team, known as Mermaid Japan, that won silver in the mixed team event with a score of 821.7404 points. The result marked Japan's sixth consecutive silver medal in the Asian Games artistic swimming team competition.
