= Kenneth Gaudet =

American synchronized swimmer (born 2004)

Personal information
- Born: November 4, 2004 (age 21) Lakeland, Florida, United States

Sport
- Sport: Swimming
- Strokes: Synchronised swimming
Medal record
Men's Synchronized swimming
Representing the United States
World Championships
Silver medal – second place	2023 Fukuoka	Solo technical routine
Bronze medal – third place	2023 Fukuoka	Solo free routine
Junior Pan American Games
Gold medal – first place	2021 Cali-Valle	Mixed duet

Kenneth Gaudet (born November 4, 2004) is an American synchronized swimmer. He won a silver medal at the 2023 World Aquatics Championships.
At the age of 17, he won a gold medal in the Mixed Duet category at the 2021 Junior Pan American Games, held in Cali, Colombia, along with partner Ivy Davis.
