= Yotaro Sato =

Japanese artistic swimmer

Personal information
- Nationality: Japanese
- Born: 10 August 2004 (age 21)
- Height: 180 cm (5 ft 11 in)

Sport
- Country: Japan
- Sport: Artistic swimming
- Partner: Tomoka Sato
Medal record
Men's artistic swimming
Representing Japan
Event	1st	2nd	3rd
World Championships	1	2	1
Total	1	2	1
World Championships
Gold medal – first place	2023 Fukuoka	Mixed duet technical routine
Silver medal – second place	2022 Budapest	Mixed duet technical
Silver medal – second place	2022 Budapest	Mixed duet free
Bronze medal – third place	2023 Fukuoka	Team acrobatic routine
World Junior Artistic Swimming Championships
Gold medal – first place	2022 Quebec	Mixed duet technical
Gold medal – first place	2022 Quebec	Mixed duet free
Silver medal – second place	2022 Quebec	Solo technical
Silver medal – second place	2022 Quebec	Solo free
World Youth Artistic Swimming Championships
Bronze medal – third place	2019 Samorin	Mixed duet

Yotaro Sato (born 10 August 2004) is a Japanese artistic swimmer. He won the silver medal in the mixed duet technical routine at the 2022 World Aquatics Championships with his older sister Tomoka Sato, which was the first medal for Japan in the event at a FINA World Aquatics Championships other than a bronze medal, as well as a silver medal in the mixed duet free routine. As part of the 2022 FINA Artistic Swimming World Series, he won one gold medal and one silver medal in the mixed duet free routine and one gold medal in the mixed duet technical routine. At the 2022 World Junior Championships, he became the first male artistic swimmer to win the silver medal each in the solo technical routine and the solo free routine at a World Junior Championships.

== Background ==
Sato and his older sister by approximately three years, Tomoka Sato, compete together as professional artistic swimming partners in mixed duet events.

== Career ==
=== 2019 World Youth Championships ===
Competing at the 2019 World Youth Artistic Swimming Championships, held in Šamorín, Slovakia, when he was 15 years old, Sato placed fourth in the solo figures with a score of 70.0078 points, which was less than four-tenths of a point behind bronze medalist Jozef Solymosy of Slovakia. He also won the bronze medal in the mixed duet event with a score of 147.8146 points, which included 76.9332 points for the free routine portion and 70.8814 points for the figures portion of the event.

=== 2022 Artistic Swimming World Series ===
For the 2022 FINA Artistic Swimming World Series, Sato and his partner Tomoka Sato won the silver medal in the mixed duet free routine on the first leg of the World Series, a virtual event hosted jointly by Canada and the United States in March, scoring 82.7000 points for their routine choreographed in the theme "Samori". On the first day of the fourth leg of the World Series, hosted in virtual format by Australia for the first time in May, the duo won the gold medal in the mixed duet technical routine for their performance inspired by jungle animals, which earned 83.5156 points from the judges. The following day, they won the gold medal in the mixed duet free routine with a score of 83.2667 points.

=== 2022 World Aquatics Championships ===
2022 World Championships
Silver medal – second place	mixed duet technical	86.5939
Silver medal – second place	mixed duet free	89.7333

On the second day of artistic swimming competition at the 2022 World Aquatics Championships in Budapest, Hungary in June, Sato and his partner Tomoka Sato ranked second in the preliminaries of the mixed duet technical routine with a score of 85.8086 points and advanced to the final. Achieving a final mark of 86.5939 points in the final, the duo won the silver medal. Their silver medal was the highest place finish ever for Japan in the event at a FINA World Aquatics Championships. Four days later, in the preliminaries of the mixed duet free routine, they qualified for the final ranking second with a score of 88.9000 points. He and his sister won the silver medal in the final with a score of 89.7333 points, contributing to a new record number of 7 medals achieved by artistic swimmers representing Japan at a single FINA World Aquatics Championships. They scored within 1.3 points of gold medalists Giorgio Minisini and Lucrezia Ruggiero of Italy.

=== 2022 World Junior Championships ===
At the 2022 World Junior Artistic Swimming Championships, held in August in Quebec City, Canada, Sato competed in the solo free routine on day three, scoring 83.3000 points and finishing ahead of bronze medalist Eduard Kim of Kazakhstan to win the silver medal. Two days earlier in the Championships, he won the silver medal in the solo technical routine with a score of 80.9088 points. The Championships was the first World Junior Artistic Swimming Championships to include male solo technical and free routines in the program. One day after the silver medal in the solo technical routine, he and Ayano Shimada won the gold medal in the mixed duet technical routine with a score of 84.0251 points, outscoring the silver medal duo from Spain by 0.7933 points. On 26 August, day four of competition, he won a second gold medal, this time helping score 85.7000 points in the mixed duet free routine.

== International championships ==
Meet	solo figures	solo technical	solo free	mixed duet technical	mixed duet free	mixed duet
Junior level
WYC 2019	4th (70.0078)	—N/a	—N/a	—N/a	—N/a	(bronze) (147.8146)
WJC 2022	—N/a	(silver) (80.9088)	(silver) (83.3000)	(gold) (84.0251)	(gold) (85.7000)	—N/a
Senior level
WC 2022	—N/a	—N/a	—N/a	(silver) (86.5939)	(silver) (89.7333)	—N/a

== See also ==
- List of World Aquatics Championships medalists in synchronised swimming
- 2022 FINA Artistic Swimming World Series
