= Spain at the 2025 World Aquatics Championships =

- Flag of Spain
- World Aquatics code: ESP
- National federation: Royal Spanish Swimming Federation
- Website: rfen.es

in Singapore
- Competitors: 67 in 5 sports
- Medals Ranked 6th: Gold 4 Silver 3 Bronze 5 Total 12

World Aquatics Championships appearances
- 1973; 1975; 1978; 1982; 1986; 1991; 1994; 1998; 2001; 2003; 2005; 2007; 2009; 2011; 2013; 2015; 2017; 2019; 2022; 2023; 2024; 2025

Spain will compete at the 2025 World Aquatics Championships in Singapore from July 11 to August 3, 2025.

== Medalists ==
Medal	Name	Sport	Event	Date
1st place, gold medalist(s)	Iris Tió	Artistic swimming	Women's solo free routine	22 July 2025
1st place, gold medalist(s)	Lilou Lluís; Iris Tió	Artistic swimming	Women's duet free routine	24 July 2025
1st place, gold medalist(s)	Spain men's national water polo team: Unai Aguirre; Alberto Munárriz; Álvaro Granados; Bernat Sanahuja; Miguel del Toro; Marc Larumbe; José Javier Sánchez; Sergi Cabanas; Roger Tahull; Felipe Perrone (c); Unai Biel; Alejandro Bustos; Eduardo Lorrio; Biel Gomila Faiges; Fran Valera	Water polo	Men's tournament	24 July 2025
1st place, gold medalist(s)	Dennis González Boneu; Iris Tió	Artistic swimming	Mixed duet free routine	25 July 2025
2nd place, silver medalist(s)	Dennis González Boneu	Artistic swimming	Men's solo technical routine	19 July 2025
2nd place, silver medalist(s)	Dennis González Boneu; Mireia Hernández	Artistic swimming	Mixed duet technical routine	23 July 2025
2nd place, silver medalist(s)	Carlos Gimeno	High diving	Men's high diving	27 July 2025
3rd place, bronze medalist(s)	Iris Tió	Artistic swimming	Women's solo technical routine	19 July 2025
3rd place, bronze medalist(s)	Cristina Arambula; Meritxell Ferré; Marina García Polo; Dennis González Boneu; Alisa Ozhogina; Paula Ramírez; Sara Saldaña; Iris Tió	Artistic swimming	Team free routine	20 July 2025
3rd place, bronze medalist(s)	Cristina Arambula; Meritxell Ferré; Marina García; Lilou Lluís; Alisa Ozhogina; Paula Ramírez; Sara Saldaña; Iris Tió; Mireia Hernández	Artistic swimming	Team technical routine	22 July 2025
3rd place, bronze medalist(s)	Spain women's national water polo team: Mariona Terre Marti; Ariadna Ruiz; Anni Espar (c); Beatriz Ortiz; Nona Pérez; Paula Crespí; Elena Ruiz; Paula Prats Rodriguez; Daniela Moreno Perez; Paula Camus; Irene González; Paula Leitón; Martina Terré; Carlota Peñalver	Water polo	Women's tournament	23 July 2025
3rd place, bronze medalist(s)	Cristina Arámbula; Meritxell Ferré; Marina García Polo; Dennis González; Lilou Lluís; Meritxell Mas; Paula Ramírez; Sara Saldaña	Artistic swimming	Team acrobatic routine	25 July 2025

Multiple medalists
Name	Sport	1st place, gold medalist(s)	2nd place, silver medalist(s)	3rd place, bronze medalist(s)	Total
Iris Tió	Artistic swimming	3	0	3	6
Dennis González Boneu	Artistic swimming	1	2	2	5
Lilou Lluís	Artistic swimming	1	0	2	3
Meritxell Ferré	Artistic swimming	0	0	3	3
Marina García Polo	Artistic swimming	0	0	3	3
Alisa Ozhogina	Artistic swimming	0	0	2	2
Paula Ramírez	Artistic swimming	0	0	3	3
Sara Saldaña	Artistic swimming	0	0	3	3
Cristina Arámbula	Artistic swimming	0	0	3	3

== Competitors ==
The following is the list of competitors in the Championships.

Sport	Men	Women	Total
Artistic swimming	2	10	12
Diving	4	2	6
High diving	1	0	1
Open water swimming	0	3	3
Swimming	9	7	16
Water polo	15	14	29
Total	31	36	67

== Artistic swimming ==
Men

Athlete	Event	Preliminaries		Final	
Athlete	Event	Points	Rank	Points	Rank
Dennis González	Solo technical routine	—N/a		241.1667	2nd place, silver medalist(s)
Jordi Caceres	Solo free routine	—N/a		202.0400	6

Women

Athlete	Event	Preliminaries		Final	
Athlete	Event	Points	Rank	Points	Rank
Iris Tió	Solo technical routine	253.7691	3 Q	260.2917	3rd place, bronze medalist(s)
Iris Tió	Solo free routine	235.3063	3 Q	245.1913	1st place, gold medalist(s)
Meritxell Ferré; Lilou Lluís	Duet technical routine	288.4774	5 Q	287.3898	5
Lilou Lluís; Iris Tió	Duet free routine	273.8950	1 Q	282.6087	1st place, gold medalist(s)

Mixed

Athlete	Event	Preliminaries		Final	
Athlete	Event	Points	Rank	Points	Rank
Dennis González; Mireia Hernández	Duet technical routine	—N/a		230.4634	2nd place, silver medalist(s)
Dennis González; Iris Tió	Duet free routine	—N/a		323.8563	1st place, gold medalist(s)
Cristina Arambula; Meritxell Ferré; Marina García; Lilou Lluís; Alisa Ozhogina; Paula Ramírez; Sara Saldaña; Iris Tió; Mireia Hernández	Team technical routine	288.4091	3 Q	294.8575	3rd place, bronze medalist(s)
Cristina Arambula; Meritxell Ferré; Marina García Polo; Dennis González; Alisa Ozhogina; Paula Ramírez; Sara Saldaña; Iris Tió	Team free routine	329.4288	2 Q	321.1328	3rd place, bronze medalist(s)
Cristina Arámbula; Meritxell Ferré; Marina García Polo; Dennis González; Lilou Lluís; Meritxell Mas; Paula Ramírez; Sara Saldaña	Team acrobatic routine	224.2870	2 Q	221.0962	3rd place, bronze medalist(s)

== Diving ==
Men

Athlete	Event	Preliminary		Semifinal		Final	
Athlete	Event	Points	Rank	Points	Rank	Points	Rank
Max Liñán	1 m springboard	325.60	23	—N/a		Did not advance	
Juan Pablo Cortes Zapata	3 m springboard	340.30	40	Did not advance			
Max Liñán	3 m springboard	368.00	21	Did not advance			
Rodrigo Cardona Herrero	10 m platform	351.20	30	Did not advance			
Jorge Rodriguez Ledesma	10 m platform	378.95	18	379.95	17	Did not advance	
Juan Pablo Cortes Zapata; Max Liñán	3 m synchro springboard	342.42	14	—N/a		Did not advance	

Women

Athlete	Event	Preliminary		Semifinal		Final	
Athlete	Event	Points	Rank	Points	Rank	Points	Rank
Valeria Antolino	10 m platform	249.00	22	Did not advance			
Ana Carvajal	10 m platform	249.70	21	Did not advance			
Valeria Antolino; Ana Carvajal	10 m synchro platform	260.70	11	—N/a		Did not advance	

Mixed

Athlete	Event	Final	
Athlete	Event	Points	Rank
Valeria Antolino; Ana Carvajal; Juan Pablo Cortes Zapata; Jorge Rodriguez Ledesma	Team	358.75	9

== High diving ==
Spain entered 1 high diver.

Men

Athlete	Event	Preliminaries		Final	
Athlete	Event	Points	Rank	Points	Rank
Carlos Gimeno	Men's high diving	450.65	2 Q	425.30	2nd place, silver medalist(s)

== Open water swimming ==
Women

Athlete	Event	Heat		Semi-final		Final	
Athlete	Event	Time	Rank	Time	Rank	Time	Rank
María de Valdés	Women's 5 km	—N/a				1:02:33.1	4
María de Valdés	Women's 10 km	—N/a				2:08:09.6	4
Ángela Martínez	Women's 3 km knockout sprints	18:35.6	4 Q	12:10.5	5 Q	6:28.1	9
Ángela Martínez	Women's 10 km	—N/a				2:08:17.3	5
Paula Otero	Women's 3 km knockout sprints	18:18.7	12	Did not advance			
Paula Otero	Women's 5 km	—N/a				1:04:28.7	17

== Swimming ==
Spain entered 16 swimmers.

Men

Athlete	Event	Heat		Semi-final		Final	
Athlete	Event	Time	Rank	Time	Rank	Time	Rank
Nil Cadevall	50 m breaststroke	27.90	41	Did not advance			
Nil Cadevall	100 m breaststroke	1:00.93	26	Did not advance			
Nil Cadevall	200 m individual medley	2:01.70	27	Did not advance			
Carles Coll	200 m breaststroke	2:10.30	5 Q	2:08.49 NR	5	2:09.44	7
Sergio de Celis	50 m freestyle	22.06	22	Did not advance			
Arbidel González	100 m butterfly	53.12	39	Did not advance			
Arbidel González	200 m butterfly	1:56.48	17	Did not advance			
Luca Hoek	100 m freestyle	48.23 NR	14	48.04 NR	14	Did not advance	
Iván Martínez	50 m backstroke	25.03	23	Did not advance			
Iván Martínez	200 m backstroke	1:58.66	26	Did not advance			
Miguel Pérez-Godoy	200 m freestyle	1:48.46	33	Did not advance			
Adrián Santos	50 m backstroke	24.76	10 Q	24.80	13	Did not advance	
Adrián Santos	100 m backstroke	54.22	23	Did not advance			
Sergio de Celis; Luca Hoek; Miguel Pérez-Godoy; Nacho Campos Beas	4 × 100 m freestyle relay	3:14.34	16	—N/a		Did not advance	
Adrián Santos; Carles Coll; Arbidel González; Luca Hoek	4 × 100 m medley relay	3:36.14	16	—N/a		Did not advance	

Women

Athlete	Event	Heat		Semi-final		Final	
Athlete	Event	Time	Rank	Time	Rank	Time	Rank
Laura Cabanes	200 m butterfly	2:09.89	14 Q	2:10.07	12	Did not advance	
Laura Cabanes	200 m individual medley	2:13.80	23	Did not advance			
Emma Carrasco	200 m breaststroke	2:27.80	21	Did not advance			
Emma Carrasco	200 m individual medley	2:12.29; 2:12.21	16 S/off; 1 Q	2:12.49	16	Did not advance	
Emma Carrasco	400 m individual medley	4:44.47	13	—N/a		Did not advance	
María Daza	50 m freestyle	25.40	27	Did not advance			
María Daza	100 m freestyle	54.55	21	Did not advance			
Jimena Ruiz	50 m breaststroke	31.50	28	Did not advance			
Jimena Ruiz	100 m breaststroke	1:09.84	39	Did not advance			
Estella Tonrath	200 m backstroke	2:09.29	7 Q	2:09.84	12	Did not advance	
Alba Vázquez	400 m individual medley	4:46.01	14	—N/a		Did not advance	
Carmen Weiler	50 m backstroke	28.14	22	Did not advance			
Carmen Weiler	100 m backstroke	59.86	11 Q	59.92	12	Did not advance	
Carmen Weiler	200 m backstroke	2:10.08	13 Q	2:10.40	14	Did not advance	
Carmen Weiler; Jimena Ruiz; Laura Cabanes; Maria Daza Garcia	4 × 100 m medley relay	4:05.49	17	—N/a		Did not advance	

Mixed

Athlete	Event	Heat		Final	
Athlete	Event	Time	Rank	Time	Rank
Sergio de Celis; Luca Hoek; Carmen Weiler; María Daza	4 × 100 m freestyle relay	3:24.48 NR	5 Q	3:24.87	7
Estella Tonrath; Nil Cadevall; Arbidel González; María Daza	4 × 100 m medley relay	3:48.87	14	Did not advance	

== Water polo ==
Summary

Key:
- FT – After full time.
- P – Match decided by penalty-shootout.

Team	Event	Group stage				Quarterfinal	Semifinal	Final / BM	
Team	Event	Opposition Score	Opposition Score	Opposition Score	Rank	Opposition Score	Opposition Score	Opposition Score	Rank
Spain men's	Men's tournament	Japan; W 22–16	Australia; W 10–7	Hungary; W 10–9	1 Q	Montenegro; W 14–5	Greece; W 4–2^{P} FT: 7–7	Hungary; W 15–13	1st place, gold medalist(s)
Spain women's	Women's tournament	South Africa; W 23–4	France; W 23–6	Great Britain; W 16–7	1 Q	Netherlands; W 4–2^{P} FT: 11–11	Hungary; L 9–15	United States; W 13–12	3rd place, bronze medalist(s)

=== Men's tournament ===
Team roster

The following is the Spanish roster.

Head coach: David Martín

- 1 Unai Aguirre GK
- 2 Alberto Munárriz FP
- 3 Álvaro Granados FP
- 4 Bernat Sanahuja FP
- 5 Miguel del Toro FP
- 6 Marc Larumbe FP
- 7 José Javier Bustos Sánchez FP
- 8 Sergi Cabanas FP
- 9 Roger Tahull FP
- 10 Felipe Perrone FP
- 11 Unai Biel FP
- 12 Alejandro Bustos FP
- 13 Eduardo Lorrio GK
- 14 Biel Gomila Faiges FP
- 15 Fran Valera FP

Group play

Pos	Team	Pld	W	PSW	PSL	L	GF	GA	GD	Pts	Qualification
1	Spain	3	3	0	0	0	42	32	+10	9	Quarterfinals
2	Hungary	3	2	0	0	1	50	34	+16	6	Playoffs
3	Japan	3	1	0	0	2	46	56	−10	3	Playoffs
4	Australia	3	0	0	0	3	24	40	−16	0	13–16th place semifinals

Source: Omegatiming
Rules for classification: 1) points; 2) head-to-head points; 3) head-to-head goal difference; 4) head-to-head number of goals scored; 5) Goal difference.

12 July 2025; 16:00	Report	Spain	22–16	Japan	OCBC Aquatic Centre, Singapore; Referees: Scott Voltz (USA), Michiel Zwart (NED)
12 July 2025; 16:00	Report	Score by quarters: 5–3, 6–2, 5–4, 6–7			OCBC Aquatic Centre, Singapore; Referees: Scott Voltz (USA), Michiel Zwart (NED)
12 July 2025; 16:00	Report	Granados 5	Goals	Inaba 5	OCBC Aquatic Centre, Singapore; Referees: Scott Voltz (USA), Michiel Zwart (NED)

14 July 2025; 16:00	Report	Australia	7–10	Spain	OCBC Aquatic Centre, Singapore; Referees: Stanko Ivanovski (MNE), Frank Ohme (GER)
14 July 2025; 16:00	Report	Score by quarters: 0–4, 2–5, 2–0, 3–1			OCBC Aquatic Centre, Singapore; Referees: Stanko Ivanovski (MNE), Frank Ohme (GER)
14 July 2025; 16:00	Report	Pavillard 2	Goals	three players 2	OCBC Aquatic Centre, Singapore; Referees: Stanko Ivanovski (MNE), Frank Ohme (GER)

16 July 2025; 20:45	Report	Spain	10–9	Hungary	OCBC Aquatic Centre, Singapore; Referees: Andrej Franulović (CRO), Zhang Liang (CHN)
16 July 2025; 20:45	Report	Score by quarters: 2–2, 1–3, 2–3, 5–1			OCBC Aquatic Centre, Singapore; Referees: Andrej Franulović (CRO), Zhang Liang (CHN)
16 July 2025; 20:45	Report	Granados 4	Goals	Angyal, Vigvári 2	OCBC Aquatic Centre, Singapore; Referees: Andrej Franulović (CRO), Zhang Liang (CHN)

Quarterfinals

20 July 2025; 17:35	Report	Spain	14–5	Montenegro	OCBC Aquatic Centre, Singapore; Referees: Tamás Kovács-Csatlós (HUN), Ivan Raković (SRB)
20 July 2025; 17:35	Report	Score by quarters: 4–3, 4–1, 3–0, 3–1			OCBC Aquatic Centre, Singapore; Referees: Tamás Kovács-Csatlós (HUN), Ivan Raković (SRB)
20 July 2025; 17:35	Report	Sanahuja 6	Goals	five players 1	OCBC Aquatic Centre, Singapore; Referees: Tamás Kovács-Csatlós (HUN), Ivan Raković (SRB)

Semifinals

22 July 2025; 17:35	Report	Greece	9–11 (PSO)	Spain	OCBC Aquatic Centre, Singapore; Referees: Michiel Zwart (NED), Frank Ohme (GER)
22 July 2025; 17:35	Report	Score by quarters: 2–3, 1–3, 1–0, 3–1 PSO: 2–4			OCBC Aquatic Centre, Singapore; Referees: Michiel Zwart (NED), Frank Ohme (GER)
22 July 2025; 17:35	Report	Genidounias, Gkillas 2	Goals	Sanahuja 3	OCBC Aquatic Centre, Singapore; Referees: Michiel Zwart (NED), Frank Ohme (GER)

Final

24 July 2025; 21:35	Report	Spain	15–13	Hungary	OCBC Aquatic Centre, Singapore; Referees: Georgios Stavridis (GRE), Boris Margeta (SLO)
24 July 2025; 21:35	Report	Score by quarters: 5–5, 2–1, 2–4, 6–3			OCBC Aquatic Centre, Singapore; Referees: Georgios Stavridis (GRE), Boris Margeta (SLO)
24 July 2025; 21:35	Report	Sanahuja, Granados 5	Goals	Burián 3	OCBC Aquatic Centre, Singapore; Referees: Georgios Stavridis (GRE), Boris Margeta (SLO)

=== Women's tournament ===
Team roster

The following is the Spanish roster.

Head coach: Jordi Valls

- 1 Mariona Terre Marti GK
- 2 Ariadna Ruiz FP
- 3 Anni Espar FP
- 4 Beatriz Ortiz FP
- 5 Nona Pérez FP
- 6 Paula Crespí FP
- 7 Elena Ruiz FP
- 8 Paula Prats Rodriguez FP
- 9 Daniela Moreno Perez FP
- 10 Paula Camus FP
- 11 Irene González FP
- 12 Paula Leitón FP
- 13 Martina Terré GK
- 14 Carlota Peñalver Granero FP

Group play

Pos	Team	Pld	W	PSW	PSL	L	GF	GA	GD	Pts	Qualification
1	Spain	3	3	0	0	0	62	17	+45	9	Quarterfinals
2	Great Britain	3	2	0	0	1	31	28	+3	6	Playoffs
3	France	3	1	0	0	2	28	41	−13	3	Playoffs
4	South Africa	3	0	0	0	3	13	48	−35	0	13–16th place semifinals

Source: Omegatiming
Rules for classification: 1) points; 2) head-to-head points; 3) head-to-head goal difference; 4) head-to-head number of goals scored; 5) Goal difference.

11 July 2025; 09:00	Report	South Africa	4–23	Spain	OCBC Aquatic Centre, Singapore; Referees: Wu Zhekang (SGP), Michiel Zwart (NED)
11 July 2025; 09:00	Report	Score by quarters: 1–9, 0–5, 2–4, 1–5			OCBC Aquatic Centre, Singapore; Referees: Wu Zhekang (SGP), Michiel Zwart (NED)
11 July 2025; 09:00	Report	four players 1	Goals	González 5	OCBC Aquatic Centre, Singapore; Referees: Wu Zhekang (SGP), Michiel Zwart (NED)

13 July 2025; 16:00	Report	Spain	23–6	France	OCBC Aquatic Centre, Singapore; Referees: Jennifer McCall (USA), Fiona Haigh (AUS)
13 July 2025; 16:00	Report	Score by quarters: 6–3, 5–2, 6–0, 6–1			OCBC Aquatic Centre, Singapore; Referees: Jennifer McCall (USA), Fiona Haigh (AUS)
13 July 2025; 16:00	Report	Ruiz 4	Goals	Vernoux 2	OCBC Aquatic Centre, Singapore; Referees: Jennifer McCall (USA), Fiona Haigh (AUS)

15 July 2025; 13:45	Report	Great Britain	7–16	Spain	OCBC Aquatic Centre, Singapore; Referees: Marcella Braga (BRA), Alessia Ferrari (ITA)
15 July 2025; 13:45	Report	Score by quarters: 0–4, 1–3, 5–3, 1–6			OCBC Aquatic Centre, Singapore; Referees: Marcella Braga (BRA), Alessia Ferrari (ITA)
15 July 2025; 13:45	Report	three players 3	Goals	Ruiz 3	OCBC Aquatic Centre, Singapore; Referees: Marcella Braga (BRA), Alessia Ferrari (ITA)

Quarterfinals

19 July 2025; 20:45	Report	Spain	15–13 (PSO)	Netherlands	OCBC Aquatic Centre, Singapore; Referees: Frank Ohme (GER), Georgios Stavridis (GRE)
19 July 2025; 20:45	Report	Score by quarters: 3–1, 4–2, 3–5, 1–3 PSO: 4–2			OCBC Aquatic Centre, Singapore; Referees: Frank Ohme (GER), Georgios Stavridis (GRE)
19 July 2025; 20:45	Report	Ortiz 3	Goals	L. Rogge 6	OCBC Aquatic Centre, Singapore; Referees: Frank Ohme (GER), Georgios Stavridis (GRE)

Semifinals

21 July 2025; 21:35	Report	Hungary	15–9	Spain	OCBC Aquatic Centre, Singapore; Referees: Alessia Ferrari (ITA), Andrej Franulović (CRO)
21 July 2025; 21:35	Report	Score by quarters: 6–2, 5–2, 3–2, 1–3			OCBC Aquatic Centre, Singapore; Referees: Alessia Ferrari (ITA), Andrej Franulović (CRO)
21 July 2025; 21:35	Report	Keszthelyi, Szilágyi 3	Goals	Ruiz 3	OCBC Aquatic Centre, Singapore; Referees: Alessia Ferrari (ITA), Andrej Franulović (CRO)

Third place game

23 July 2025; 20:00	Report	United States	12–13	Spain	OCBC Aquatic Centre, Singapore; Referees: Andrej Franulović (CRO), Michiel Zwart (NED)
23 July 2025; 20:00	Report	Score by quarters: 2–4, 2–3, 5–4, 3–2			OCBC Aquatic Centre, Singapore; Referees: Andrej Franulović (CRO), Michiel Zwart (NED)
23 July 2025; 20:00	Report	Lineback 5	Goals	Espar 4	OCBC Aquatic Centre, Singapore; Referees: Andrej Franulović (CRO), Michiel Zwart (NED)
