= Artistic swimming at the 2024 European Aquatics Championships – Team technical routine =

Team technical routine at the 2024 European Aquatics Championships
- Venue: Sports Centre Milan Gale Muškatirović
- Dates: 10 June
- Competitors: 40 from 5 nations
- Winning points: 278.4684

Medalists
gold medal	Cristina Arámbula; Meritxell Ferré; Marina García; Lilou Lluís; Meritxell Mas; Alisa Ozhogina; Iris Tió; Blanca Toledano	Spain
silver medal	Maria Alzigkouzi Kominea; Thaleia Dampali; Athina Kamarinopoulou; Zoi Karangelou; Maria Karapanagiotou; Ifigeneia Krommydaki; Sofia Rigakou; Vasiliki Thanou	Greece
bronze medal	Beatrice Andina; Valentina Bisi; Beatrice Esegio; Alessia Macchi; Giorgia Lucia Macino; Marta Murru; Carmen Rocchino; Sophie Tabbiani	Italy

The Team technical routine competition of the 2024 European Aquatics Championships was held on 10 June 2024.

== Results ==
The final was held on 10 June at 16:30.

Rank	Nation	Swimmers	Points
1st place, gold medalist(s)	Spain	Cristina Arámbula; Meritxell Ferré; Marina García; Lilou Lluís; Meritxell Mas; Alisa Ozhogina; Iris Tió; Blanca Toledano	278.4684
2nd place, silver medalist(s)	Greece	Maria Alzigkouzi Kominea; Thaleia Dampali; Athina Kamarinopoulou; Zoi Karangelou; Maria Karapanagiotou; Ifigeneia Krommydaki; Sofia Rigakou; Vasiliki Thanou	257.8918
3rd place, bronze medalist(s)	Italy	Beatrice Andina; Valentina Bisi; Beatrice Esegio; Alessia Macchi; Giorgia Lucia Macino; Marta Murru; Carmen Rocchino; Sophie Tabbiani	256.8584 8
4	Great Britain	Eleanor Blinkhorn; Florence Blinkhorn; Lily Halasi; Rhea Howard; Holly Hughes; Sophie Rowney; Robyn Swatman; Eve Young	211.3692
5	Serbia	Ana Gobeljić; Jelena Kontić; Iva Lukić; Ivan Martinović; Sara Miletić; Teodora Sperlić; Sara Stojanović; Lana Takić	159.6992
