= Artistic swimming at the 2025 World Aquatics Championships – Women's duet technical routine =

Women's duet technical routine at the Artistic swimming at the 2025 World Aquatics Championships
- Venue: World Aquatics Championships Arena
- Location: Singapore
- Dates: 18 July (preliminaries); 21 July (final)
- Competitors: 78 from 39 nations
- Teams: 39

Medalists
gold medal	Anna-Maria Alexandri; Eirini-Marina Alexandri	Austria
silver medal	Lin Yanhan; Lin Yanjun	China
bronze medal	Mayya Doroshko; Tatiana Gayday	Authorised Neutral Athletes

The Women's duet technical routine competition at the 2025 World Aquatics Championships was held on 18 and 21 July 2025.

== Results ==
The preliminary round was started on 18 July at 14:02. The final was started on 21 July at 18:32.

Green denotes finalists

Rank	Swimmers	Nationality	Preliminary		Final	
Rank	Swimmers	Nationality	Points	Rank	Points	Rank
1st place, gold medalist(s)	Anna-Maria Alexandri; Eirini-Marina Alexandri	Austria	305.1684	1	307.1451	1
2nd place, silver medalist(s)	Lin Yanhan; Lin Yanjun	China	301.0933	2	301.4057	2
3rd place, bronze medalist(s)	Mayya Doroshko; Tatiana Gayday	Neutral Athlete B	297.0033	3	300.2183	3
4	Moe Higa; Tomoka Sato	Japan	293.4950	4	295.6240	4
5	Meritxell Ferré; Lilou Lluís	Spain	288.4774	5	287.3898	5
6	Enrica Piccoli; Lucrezia Ruggiero	Italy	279.0533	7	285.0441	6
7	Daria Fedaruk; Vasilina Khandoshka	Neutral Athlete A	262.8175	12	277.4267	7
8	Marla Arellano; Itzamary González	Mexico	278.6633	8	276.7307	8
9	Daria Moshynska; Anastasiia Shmonina	Ukraine	267.5208	10	273.4933	9
10	Ghizal Akbar; Jaime Czarkowski	United States	265.7292	11	269.5409	10
11	Anastasia Bayandina; Romane Lunel	France	284.6158	6	254.9667	11
12	Audrey Lamothe; Ximena Ortiz	Canada	271.6526	9	236.5825	12
13	Klara Bleyer; Amélie Blumenthal Haz	Germany	261.1208	13	Did not advance	
14	Zoi Karangelou; Sofia Malkogeorgou	Greece	260.0175	14	Did not advance	
15	Lea Krajčovičová; Žofia Strapeková	Slovakia	257.8766	15	Did not advance	
16	Arina Pushkina; Yasmin Tuyakova	Kazakhstan	249.1542	16	Did not advance	
17	Yvette Chong; Debbie Soh	Singapore	243.6826	17	Did not advance	
18	Sabina Makhmudova; Ziyodakhon Toshkhujaeva	Uzbekistan	241.7117	18	Did not advance	
19	Georgia Courage-Gardiner; Margo Joseph-Kuo	Australia	241.6624	19	Did not advance	
20	Melisa Ceballos; Estefanía Roa	Colombia	240.9567	20	Did not advance	
21	Zeina Amr; Maryam Samer	Egypt	239.4892	21	Did not advance	
22	Soledad García; Trinidad García	Chile	238.8183	22	Did not advance	
23	Blanka Barbócz; Blanka Taksonyi	Hungary	238.2042	23	Did not advance	
24	Gabriela Regly; Anna Giulia Veloso	Brazil	235.3092	24	Did not advance	
25	Robyn Swatman; Eve Young	Great Britain	233.1983	25	Did not advance	
26	Tekla Gogilidze; Nita Natobadze	Georgia	229.9192	26	Did not advance	
27	Korina Maretić; Mia Piri	Croatia	223.1858	27	Did not advance	
28	Julie Lewczyszynová; Sofie Schindlerová	Czech Republic	217.4508	28	Did not advance	
29	Agustina Medina; Lucía Ververis	Uruguay	215.8466	29	Did not advance	
30	Ana Culic; Thea Grima Buttigieg	Malta	214.5317	30	Did not advance	
31	Tiziana Bonucci; María Carasatorre	Argentina	210.2050	31	Did not advance	
32	Cesia Castaneda; Grecia Mendoza	El Salvador	204.3550	32	Did not advance	
33	María Ccoyllo; Lía Luna	Peru	201.0175	33	Did not advance	
34	María Alfaro; Anna Mitinian	Costa Rica	200.0366	34	Did not advance	
35	Katherine Chu; Hung Sze Ching	Hong Kong	188.4642	35	Did not advance	
36	Hilda Tri Julyandra; Talitha Amabelle Putri Subeni	Indonesia	185.7741	36	Did not advance	
37	Lam Cheng Tong; Leong Hoi Cheng	Macau	172.9959	37	Did not advance	
38	Gabriela Batista; Alejandra Molina	Cuba	166.1010	38	Did not advance	
39	Aurelia Pretorius; Rebecca Schenk	South Africa	150.4983	39	Did not advance	
