= Artistic swimming at the 2023 European Games – Duet technical routine =

Duet technical at the 2023 European Games
- Venue: Oswiecim
- Dates: 22 June
- Competitors: 38 from 19 nations
- Teams: 19
- Winning points: 266.4584

Medalists
gold medal	Anna-Maria Alexandri; Eirini-Marina Alexandri	Austria
silver medal	Bregje de Brouwer; Marloes Steenbeek	Netherlands
bronze medal	Sofia Malkogeorgou; Evangelia Platanioti	Greece

The Duet technical routine competition of the 2023 European Games was held on 22 June 2023 in Oswiecim, Poland. Together with the Duet Free routine event, it formed part of a direct qualification competition for the 2024 Summer Olympics. Anna-Maria Alexandri and Eirini-Marina Alexandri secured the quota for Austria, winning both free and technical golds.

== Results ==
No preliminary round was held. In the final, all nineteen duets perform.

Rank	Nation	Swimmers	D	E	A	P	Total
1st place, gold medalist(s)	Austria	Anna-Maria Alexandri; Eirini-Marina Alexandri	33.750	163.3584	103.1000	-2.9	266.4584
2nd place, silver medalist(s)	Netherlands	Bregje de Brouwer; Marloes Steenbeek	32.050	150.5783	97.8500	-4.7	248.4283
3rd place, bronze medalist(s)	Greece	Sofia Malkogeorgou; Evangelia Platanioti	30.200	145.9399	99.7500	-4.2	245.6899
4	Ukraine	Maryna Aleksiyiva; Vladyslava Aleksiyiva	29.900	140.6001	104.4500	-3.8	245.0501
5	Great Britain	Kate Shortman; Isabelle Thorpe	31.550	144.8967	98.1000	-3.9	242.9967
6	Israel	Shelly Bobritsky; Ariel Nassee	29.000	134.2933	98.3500	-4.6	232.6433
7	Spain	Alisa Ozhogina; Iris Tió	24.250	126.9616	104.7500	-4.2	231.7116
8	Italy	Linda Cerruti; Lucrezia Ruggiero	24.550	124.7250	102.1000	-5.3	226.8250
9	France	Anastasia Bayandina; Eve Planeix	23.650	118.2251	101.3500	-4.2	219.5751
10	Czech Republic	Karolína Klusková; Aneta Mrázková	27.800	125.4199	87.8500	-5.5	213.2699
11	Portugal	Maria Beatriz Gonçalves; Cheila Morais	21.650	107.3166	94.3000	-4.3	201.6166
12	Slovakia	Chiara Diky; Lea Krajčovičová	21.800	107.3733	86.4500	-5.3	193.8233
13	Liechtenstein	Noemi Büchel; Leila Marxer	20.500	87.0133	87.3500	-15.1	174.3633
14	Bulgaria	Sasha Miteva; Dalia Penkova	20.800	92.2234	81.4000	-5.2	173.6234
15	Hungary	Blanka Barbócz; Angelika Bastianelli	18.650	85.7866	85.0000	-6.4	170.7866
16	Denmark	Karoline Christensen; Mia Heide	23.400	95.2933	74.3000	-4.9	169.5933
17	Turkey	Nil Talu; Esmanur Yirmibeş	16.600	78.5000	79.2500	-7.9	157.7500
18	Poland	Nikola Leja; Swietłana Szczepańska	14.500	62.4000	76.6500	-10.2	139.0500
19	Estonia	Ksenija Grabtšuk; Maria Ruditš	9.650	22.1851	64.1000	-16.0	86.2851
