= Artistic swimming at the 2026 European Aquatics Championships – Women's duet technical routine =

Women's duet technical routine at the 2026 European Aquatics Championships
- Venue: Paris Aquatic Centre
- Dates: 31 July
- Competitors: 38 from 19 nations
- Teams: 19
- Winning points: 311.4308

Medalists
gold medal	Anna-Maria Alexandri; Eirini-Marina Alexandri	Greece
silver medal	Mayya Doroshko; Elizaveta Minaeva	Authorised Neutral Athletes
bronze medal	Kate Shortman; Isabelle Thorpe	Great Britain

The Women's duet technical routine competition at the 2026 European Aquatics Championships was held on 31 July 2026.

== Results ==
The event was held at 18:00.

Rank	Swimmers	Nationality	Points
1st place, gold medalist(s)	Anna-Maria Alexandri; Eirini-Marina Alexandri	Greece	311.4308
2nd place, silver medalist(s)	Mayya Doroshko; Elizaveta Minaeva	Neutral Athletes B	302.9950
3rd place, bronze medalist(s)	Kate Shortman; Isabelle Thorpe	Great Britain	297.9108
4	Laëlys Alavez; Romane Lunel	France	294.6549
5	Enrica Piccoli; Lucrezia Ruggiero	Italy	290.4416
6	Klara Bleyer; Maria Denisov	Germany	284.9774
7	Anastasiya Dabravolskaya; Aliaksandra Mironchyk	Neutral Athletes A	275.7825
8	Lilou Lluís; Iris Tió	Spain	274.0117
9	Daria Moshynska; Ameliia Volynska	Ukraine	270.0233
10	Catherine Kunin; Aya Mazor	Israel	260.6284
11	Maria Alavidze; Nita Natobadze	Georgia	256.9308
12	Anna-Sophia Aeschbacher; Ixchel Höner	Switzerland	255.5009
13	Selin Hürmeriç; Ece Üngör	Turkey	251.4525
14	Anna Carvalho; Inês Dubini	Portugal	233.8316
15	Maria Valeva; Lora Zheynova	Bulgaria	231.7550
16	Julie Cooninx; Lara Drijkoningen	Belgium	200.7750
17	Mari Moilala; Iiris-Maria Nurmi	Finland	193.7783
18	Julie Lewczyszynová; Sofie Schindlerová	Czechia	184.2883
19	Ana Culic; Thea Grima Buttigieg	Malta	175.7850
