= Artistic swimming at the 2025 World Aquatics Championships – Women's solo free routine =

Women's solo free routine at the Artistic swimming at the 2025 World Aquatics Championships
- Venue: World Aquatics Championships Arena
- Location: Singapore
- Dates: 20 July (preliminaries); 22 July (final)
- Competitors: 30 from 30 nations
- Winning points: 235.3063

Medalists
gold medal	Iris Tió	Spain
silver medal	Xu Huiyan	China
bronze medal	Vasilina Khandoshka

The Women's solo free routine competition at the 2025 World Aquatics Championships was held on 20 and 22 July 2025.

== Results ==
The preliminary round was held on 20 July at 10:02. The final was started on 22 July at 10:02.

Green denotes finalists

Rank	Swimmer	Nationality	Preliminary		Final	
Rank	Swimmer	Nationality	Points	Rank	Points	Rank
1st place, gold medalist(s)	Iris Tió	Spain	235.3063	3	245.1913	1
2nd place, silver medalist(s)	Xu Huiyan	China	238.7737	1	241.0025	2
3rd place, bronze medalist(s)	Vasilina Khandoshka	Neutral Athlete A	238.2762	2	239.5437	3
4	Vasiliki Alexandri	Austria	229.8163	5	238.9976	4
5	Klara Bleyer	Germany	229.9099	4	237.5600	5
6	Enrica Piccoli	Italy	225.7726	6	232.6551	6
7	Marloes Steenbeek	Netherlands	218.5851	8	226.3387	7
8	Audrey Lamothe	Canada	219.5675	7	224.2263	8
9	Maria Alavidze	Georgia	213.2687	11	220.9438	9
10	Jasmine Verbena	San Marino	214.1775	9	216.6937	10
11	Zoi Karangelou	Greece	213.8351	10	216.1775	11
12	Kyra Hoevertsz	Aruba	209.7838	12	206.7925	12
13	Karina Magrupova	Kazakhstan	205.5326	13	Did not advance	
14	Lea Krajčovičová	Slovakia	204.6238	14	Did not advance	
15	Ece Üngör	Turkey	203.8162	15	Did not advance	
16	Rachel Thean	Singapore	201.2638	16	Did not advance	
17	Matea Butorac	Croatia	195.0713	17	Did not advance	
18	Zoe Poulis	Australia	185.1412	18	Did not advance	
19	Ariana Coronado	Peru	183.0175	19	Did not advance	
20	Zea Montfort	Malta	180.4912	20	Did not advance	
21	Jennifer Russanov	New Zealand	180.2101	21	Did not advance	
22	Sabina Makhmudova	Uzbekistan	161.9862	22	Did not advance	
23	Lucía Ververis	Uruguay	149.0163	23	Did not advance	
24	Cesia Castaneda	El Salvador	147.8300	24	Did not advance	
25	Shao Anlan	Macau	140.6200	25	Did not advance	
26	Xera Vegter Maharajh	South Africa	134.0263	26	Did not advance	
27	Hilda Tri Julyandra	Indonesia	132.6663	27	Did not advance	
28	María Alfaro	Costa Rica	128.0950	28	Did not advance	
29	Alexandra Mansaré-Traoré	Guinea	100.2962	29	Did not advance	
30	Talía Joa	Cuba	91.7500	30	Did not advance	
