= Artistic swimming at the 2020 European Aquatics Championships – Duet technical routine =

Duet technical routine at the 2020 European Aquatics Championships
- Venue: Danube Arena
- Dates: 13 May 2021
- Competitors: 38 from 19 nations
- Teams: 19
- Winning points: 96.2904

Medalists
gold medal	Svetlana Kolesnichenko; Svetlana Romashina	Russia
silver medal	Marta Fiedina; Anastasiya Savchuk	Ukraine
bronze medal	Anna-Maria Alexandri; Eirini-Marina Alexandri	Austria

The Duet technical routine competition of the 2020 European Aquatics Championships was held on 13 May 2021.

== Results ==
The final was held at 09:00.

Rank	Nation	Swimmers	Points
1st place, gold medalist(s)	Russia	Svetlana Kolesnichenko; Svetlana Romashina	96.2904
2nd place, silver medalist(s)	Ukraine	Marta Fiedina; Anastasiya Savchuk	92.6862
3rd place, bronze medalist(s)	Austria	Anna-Maria Alexandri; Eirini-Marina Alexandri	89.4592
4	Belarus	Vasilina Khandoshka; Daria Kulagina	88.1958
5	Netherlands	Bregje de Brouwer; Noortje de Brouwer	87.2526
6	Spain	Alisa Ozhogina; Iris Tió	86.9546
7	Great Britain	Kate Shortman; Isabelle Thorpe	84.9244
8	Israel	Eden Blecher; Shelly Bobritsky	84.5304
9	Switzerland	Vivienne Koch; Joelle Peschl	82.7963
10	Germany	Marlene Bojer; Michelle Zimmer	82.6499
11	Liechtenstein	Lara Mechnig; Marluce Schierscher	82.2704
12	Slovakia	Nada Daabousová; Chiara Diky	78.7889
13	San Marino	Jasmine Verbena; Jasmine Zonzini	77.3348
14	Czech Republic	Karolína Klusková; Aneta Mrázková	77.2511
15	Portugal	Maria Gonçalves; Cheila Vieira	76.6679
16	Serbia	Nevena Dimitrijević; Jelena Kontić	75.5980
17	Hungary	Linda Farkas; Boglárka Gács	75.3736
18	Croatia	Antonija Huljev; Klara Šilobodec	72.7136
19	Bulgaria	Aleksandra Atanasova; Anthea Chernookova	71.9778
