= Artistic swimming at the 2025 World Aquatics Championships – Women's solo technical routine =

Women's solo technical routine at the Artistic swimming at the 2025 World Aquatics Championships
- Venue: World Aquatics Championships Arena
- Location: Singapore
- Dates: 18 July (preliminaries); 19 July (final)
- Competitors: 35 from 35 nations
- Winning points: 272.9917

Medalists
gold medal	Xu Huiyan	China
silver medal	Vasilina Khandoshka	Authorised Neutral Athletes
bronze medal	Iris Tió	Spain

The Women's solo technical routine competition at the 2025 World Aquatics Championships was held on 18 and 19 July 2025.

== Results ==
The preliminary round was started on 18 July at 10:02. The final was started on 19 July at 18:32.

Green denotes finalists

Rank	Swimmer	Nationality	Preliminary		Final	
Rank	Swimmer	Nationality	Points	Rank	Points	Rank
1st place, gold medalist(s)	Xu Huiyan	China	265.8984	1	272.9917	1
2nd place, silver medalist(s)	Vasilina Khandoshka	Neutral Athlete A	254.8200	2	260.5416	2
3rd place, bronze medalist(s)	Iris Tió	Spain	253.7691	3	260.2917	3
4	Vasiliki Alexandri	Austria	250.9533	4	253.8417	4
5	Klara Bleyer	Germany	250.2750	5	253.2892	5
6	Moe Higa	Japan	249.1833	6	251.2184	6
7	Enrica Piccoli	Italy	237.0000	8	240.2850	7
8	Romane Temessek	France	236.9400	9	239.7925	8
9	Marloes Steenbeek	Netherlands	236.4451	10	238.6417	9
10	Audrey Lamothe	Canada	234.7058	11	236.6008	10
11	Karina Magrupova	Kazakhstan	232.2050	12	233.5199	11
12	Tatiana Gayday	Neutral Athlete B	246.0517	7	228.5625	12
13	Mari Alavidze	Georgia	232.0834	13	Did not advance	
14	Jasmine Verbena	San Marino	229.8858	14	Did not advance	
15	Kyra Hoevertsz	Aruba	229.3517	15	Did not advance	
16	Zoi Karangelou	Greece	229.3250	16	Did not advance	
17	Žofia Strapeková	Slovakia	226.9667	17	Did not advance	
18	Ece Üngör	Turkey	226.0333	18	Did not advance	
19	Zoe Poulis	Australia	220.3541	19	Did not advance	
20	Rachel Thean	Singapore	215.9750	20	Did not advance	
21	Loya Cenkci	Great Britain	213.2850	21	Did not advance	
22	Zea Montfort	Malta	206.2833	22	Did not advance	
23	Sabina Makhmudova	Uzbekistan	206.2250	23	Did not advance	
24	Jennifer Russanov	New Zealand	204.0442	24	Did not advance	
25	Ariana Coronado	Peru	200.2917	25	Did not advance	
26	Mia Piri	Croatia	197.4967	26	Did not advance	
27	Patrawee Chayawararak	Thailand	194.8100	27	Did not advance	
28	Agustina Medina	Uruguay	189.2041	28	Did not advance	
29	María Alfaro	Costa Rica	187.1917	29	Did not advance	
30	Grecia Mendoza	El Salvador	186.8484	30	Did not advance	
31	Tiziana Bonucci	Argentina	183.0400	31	Did not advance	
32	Hilda Tri Julyandra	Indonesia	175.7333	32	Did not advance	
33	Xera Vegter Maharajh	South Africa	175.5766	33	Did not advance	
34	Alexandra Mansaré-Traoré	Guinea	157.6750	34	Did not advance	
35	Talía Joa	Cuba	151.5376	35	Did not advance	
