= Artistic swimming at the 2025 World Aquatics Championships – Team free routine =

Team free routine at the Artistic swimming at the 2025 World Aquatics Championships
- Venue: World Aquatics Championships Arena
- Location: Singapore
- Dates: 19 July (preliminaries); 20 July (final)
- Competitors: 160 from 20 nations
- Teams: 20
- Winning points: 348.4779

Medalists
gold medal	Chang Hao; Cheng Wentao; Dai Shiyi; Feng Yu; Li Xiuchen; Lin Yanhan; Xiang Binxuan; Xu Huiyan	China
silver medal	Kaho Aitaka; Moka Fujii; Moe Higa; Yuka Kawase; Uta Kobayashi; Tomoka Sato; Nao Shirahase; Sakurako Uchida	Japan
bronze medal	Cristina Arambula; Meritxell Ferré; Marina García Polo; Dennis González Boneu; Alisa Ozhogina; Paula Ramírez; Sara Saldaña; Iris Tió	Spain

The Team free routine competition at the 2025 World Aquatics Championships was held on 19 and 20 July 2025.

== Results ==
The preliminary round was started on 19 July 2025 at 10:02. The final was started on 20 July at 18:32.

Green denotes finalists

Rank	Nation	Preliminary		Final	
Rank	Nation	Points	Rank	Points	Rank
1st place, gold medalist(s)	China	338.2167	1	348.4779	1
2nd place, silver medalist(s)	Japan	327.9186	3	334.7232	2
3rd place, bronze medalist(s)	Spain	329.4288	2	321.1328	3
4	United States	314.2542	4	318.0808	4
5	Italy	304.5067	6	313.4337	5
6	Mexico	305.0511	5	285.7186	6
7	Kazakhstan	261.9755	8	277.8196	7
8	Neutral Athlete A	271.5473	7	274.9779	8
9	Greece	261.7529	9	250.2924	9
10	North Korea	245.1942	11	249.6529	10
11	Chile	235.4976	12	240.6881	11
12	Brazil	249.6293	10	238.3475	12
13	Israel	230.6845	13	Did not advance	
14	Great Britain	223.3776	14	Did not advance	
15	Hungary	222.8117	15	Did not advance	
16	Thailand	213.9607	16	Did not advance	
17	Hong Kong	144.9394	17	Did not advance	
18	Costa Rica	141.5545	18	Did not advance	
19	Indonesia	126.6905	19	Did not advance	
20	South Africa	101.5804	20	Did not advance	
