= Artistic swimming at the 2025 World Aquatics Championships – Men's solo free routine =

Men's solo free routine at the Artistic swimming at the 2025 World Aquatics Championships
- Venue: World Aquatics Championships Arena
- Location: Singapore
- Dates: 21 July
- Competitors: 14 from 14 nations
- Winning points: 229.5613

Medalists
gold medal	Aleksandr Maltsev	Authorised Neutral Athletes
silver medal	Guo Muye	China
bronze medal	Filippo Pelati	Italy

The Men's solo free routine competition at the 2025 World Aquatics Championships was held on 21 July 2025.

== Results ==
The final was held at 14:02.

Rank	Swimmer	Nationality	Points
1st place, gold medalist(s)	Aleksandr Maltsev	Neutral Athletes B	229.5613
2nd place, silver medalist(s)	Guo Muye	China	220.1926
3rd place, bronze medalist(s)	Filippo Pelati	Italy	213.9850
4	Ranjuo Tomblin	Great Britain	210.9125
5	Diego Villalobos	Mexico	206.8150
6	Jordi Caceres	Spain	202.0400
7	Gustavo Sánchez	Colombia	198.9025
8	Viktor Druzin	Kazakhstan	197.9225
9	Nicolás Campos	Chile	179.2325
10	Marios Kritsas	Greece	167.7863
11	David Martinez	Sweden	164.7187
12	Bernardo Santos	Brazil	152.8275
13	Wattikorn Khethirankanok	Thailand	129.7475
14	José Borges	Cuba	86.6687
