= Kazakhstan at the 2025 World Aquatics Championships =

- Flag of Kazakhstan
- World Aquatics code: KAZ
- National federation: Swimming Federation of the Republic of Kazakhstan
- Website: aquatics.kz

in Singapore
- Competitors: 28 in 4 sports
- Medals: Gold 0 Silver 0 Bronze 0 Total 0

World Aquatics Championships appearances
- 1994; 1998; 2001; 2003; 2005; 2007; 2009; 2011; 2013; 2015; 2017; 2019; 2022; 2023; 2024; 2025

Other related appearances
- Soviet Union (1973–1991)

Kazakhstan competed at the 2025 World Aquatics Championships in Singapore from July 11 to August 3, 2025.

== Competitors ==
The following is the list of competitors in the Championships.

Sport	Men	Women	Total
Artistic swimming	2	12	14
Diving	2	0	2
Open water swimming	2	4	6
Swimming	3	3	6
Total	9	19	28

== Artistic swimming ==
Men

Athlete	Event	Preliminaries		Final	
Athlete	Event	Points	Rank	Points	Rank
Eduard Kim	Solo technical routine	—		217.7084	9
Viktor Druzin	Solo free routine	—		197.9225	8

Women

Athlete	Event	Preliminaries		Final	
Athlete	Event	Points	Rank	Points	Rank
Karina Magrupova	Solo technical routine	232.2050	12 Q	233.5199	11
Karina Magrupova	Solo free routine	205.5326	13	Did not advance	
Arina Pushkina; Yasmin Tuyakova	Duet technical routine	249.1542	16	Did not advance	
Dayana Jamanchalova; Yasmin Tuyakova	Duet free routine	228.2541	13	Did not advance	

Mixed

Athlete	Event	Preliminaries		Final	
Athlete	Event	Points	Rank	Points	Rank
Eduard Kim; Nargiza Bolatova	Mixed duet technical routine	—		199.8050	7
Eduard Kim; Nargiza Bolatova	Mixed duet free routine	—		Did not start	
Dayana Jamanchalova; Aigerim Kurmangaliyeva; Xeniya Makarova; Arina Myasnikova; Anna Pavletsova; Valeriya Stolbunova; Zhaklin Yakimova; Zhaniya Zhiyengazy	Team technical routine	230.8467	13	Did not advance	
Dayana Jamanchalova; Aigerim Kurmangaliyeva; Xeniya Makarova; Arina Myasnikova; Anna Pavletsova; Valeriya Stolbunova; Yasmin Tuyakova; Zhaklin Yakimova	Team free routine	261.9755	8 Q	277.8196	7
Nargiza Bolatova; Viktor Druzin; Aigerim Kurmangaliyeva; Xeniya Makarova; Arina Myasnikova; Anna Pavletsova; Zhaklin Yakimova; Zhaniya Zhiyengazy	Team acrobatic routine	190.1238	11 Q	178.1367	12

== Diving ==
Men

Athlete	Event	Preliminaries		Semifinals		Final	
Athlete	Event	Points	Rank	Points	Rank	Points	Rank
Nazar Kozhanov	1 m springboard	276.70	43	—		Did not advance	
Nazar Kozhanov	3 m springboard	324.55	45	Did not advance			
Nazar Kozhanov; Kirill Novikov	3 m synchro springboard	275.13	25	—		Did not advance	

== Open water swimming ==
Men

Athlete	Event	Heats		Semifinal		Final	
Athlete	Event	Time	Rank	Time	Rank	Time	Rank
Galymzhan Balabek	Men's 3 km knockout sprints	18:01.9	20	Did not advance			
Galymzhan Balabek	Men's 5 km	—				Did not finish	
Lev Cherepanov	Men's 3 km knockout sprints	17:11.4	8 Q	12:00.4	20	Did not advance	
Lev Cherepanov	Men's 5 km	—				1:01:03.8	27
Lev Cherepanov	Men's 10 km	—				2:07:47.5	30

Women

Athlete	Event	Heats		Semifinal		Final	
Athlete	Event	Time	Rank	Time	Rank	Time	Rank
Ayazhan Ainabekova	Women's 5 km	—				1:16:07.8	66
Mariya Fedotova	Women's 3 km knockout sprints	18:21.0	14	Did not advance			
Mariya Fedotova	Women's 10 km	—				Did not finish	
Darya Pushko	Women's 3 km knockout sprints	20:08.7	24	Did not advance			
Darya Pushko	Women's 10 km	—				2:29:50.0	47
Saida Yelemes	Women's 5 km	—				1:11:47.1	51

Mixed

Athlete	Event	Time	Rank
Mariya Fedotova; Darya Pushko; Galymzhan Balabek; Lev Cherepanov	Team relay	1:15:00.2	11

== Swimming ==
Kazakhstan entered 6 swimmers.

Men

Athlete	Event	Heat		Semi-final		Final	
Athlete	Event	Time	Rank	Time	Rank	Time	Rank
Gleb Kovalenya	50 m backstroke	26.05	48	Did not advance			
Gleb Kovalenya	200 m backstroke	2:10.35	40	Did not advance			
Arsen Kozhakhmetov	50 m breaststroke	27.97	42	Did not advance			
Arsen Kozhakhmetov	100 m breaststroke	1:02.61	45	Did not advance			
Adilbek Mussin	50 m freestyle	22.84	52	Did not advance			
Adilbek Mussin	100 m freestyle	49.75	40	Did not advance			
Adilbek Mussin	50 metre butterfly	23.33 NR	18	Did not advance			
Adilbek Mussin	100 metre butterfly	51.87	22	Did not advance			

Women

Athlete	Event	Heat		Semi-final		Final	
Athlete	Event	Time	Rank	Time	Rank	Time	Rank
Xeniya Ignatova	50 m backstroke	29.28	33	Did not advance			
Xeniya Ignatova	100 m backstroke	1:02.32	30	Did not advance			
Xeniya Ignatova	200 m backstroke	2:14.09	28	Did not advance			
Adelaida Pchelintseva	50 m breaststroke	31.86	33	Did not advance			
Adelaida Pchelintseva	100 m breaststroke	1:13.46	50	Did not advance			
Sofia Spodarenko	50 m butterfly	26.75	32	Did not advance			
Sofia Spodarenko	100 m butterfly	1:02.88	43	Did not advance			
