= Artistic swimming at the 2025 World Aquatics Championships – Women's duet free routine =

Women's duet free routine at the Artistic swimming at the 2025 World Aquatics Championships
- Venue: World Aquatics Championships Arena
- Location: Singapore
- Dates: 23 July (preliminaries); 24 July (final)
- Competitors: 72 from 36 nations
- Teams: 36
- Winning points: 282.6087

Medalists
gold medal	Lilou Lluís; Iris Tió	Spain
silver medal	Enrica Piccoli; Lucrezia Ruggiero	Italy
bronze medal	Mayya Doroshko; Tatiana Gayday	Authorised Neutral Athletes

The Women's duet free routine competition at the 2025 World Aquatics Championships was held on 23 and 24 July 2025.

== Results ==
The preliminary round was started on 23 July at 10:02. The final was started on 24 July at 19:32.

Green denotes finalists

Rank	Swimmers	Nationality	Preliminary		Final	
Rank	Swimmers	Nationality	Points	Rank	Points	Rank
1st place, gold medalist(s)	Lilou Lluís; Iris Tió	Spain	273.8950	1	282.6087	1
2nd place, silver medalist(s)	Enrica Piccoli; Lucrezia Ruggiero	Italy	266.9571	3	278.7137	2
3rd place, bronze medalist(s)	Mayya Doroshko; Tatiana Gayday	Neutral Athlete B	269.4688	2	277.1117	3
4	Lin Yanhan; Lin Yanjun	China	251.8706	6	274.3090	4
5	Laëlys Alavez; Romane Lunel	France	252.6575	5	257.9033	5
6	Sofia Malkogeorgou; Vasiliki Thanou	Greece	240.2455	10	257.2792	6
7	Uta Kobayashi; Tomoka Sato	Japan	255.9020	4	254.9917	7
8	Klara Bleyer; Amélie Blumenthal Haz	Germany	242.4307	9	245.1512	8
9	Audrey Lamothe; Ximena Ortiz	Canada	233.0079	11	238.0437	9
10	Daria Moshynska; Anastasiia Shmonina	Ukraine	251.0959	7	231.2713	10
11	Marla Arellano; Itzamary González	Mexico	246.7462	8	228.6608	11
12	Robyn Swatman; Eve Young	Great Britain	230.3952	12	210.9404	12
13	Dayana Jamanchalova; Yasmin Tuyakova	Kazakhstan	228.2541	13	Did not advance	
14	Yvette Chong; Debbie Soh	Singapore	222.6152	14	Did not advance	
15	Selin Hürmeriç; Ece Üngör	Turkey	220.5633	15	Did not advance	
16	Maria Alavidze; Nita Natobadze	Georgia	218.3351	16	Did not advance	
17	Sara Castañeda; Melisa Ceballos	Colombia	214.9316	17	Did not advance	
18	Blanka Barbócz; Blanka Taksonyi	Hungary	214.8972	18	Did not advance	
19	Lea Krajčovičová; Žofia Strapeková	Slovakia	209.5096	19	Did not advance	
20	Daria Fedaruk; Vasilina Khandoshka	Neutral Athlete A	203.2920	20	Did not advance	
21	Gabriela Regly; Anna Giulia Veloso	Brazil	201.1367	21	Did not advance	
22	Korina Maretić; Mia Piri	Croatia	200.3586	22	Did not advance	
23	Agustina Medina; Lucía Ververis	Uruguay	197.2808	23	Did not advance	
24	Sabina Makhmudova; Ziyodakhon Toshkhujaeva	Uzbekistan	197.0643	24	Did not advance	
25	Julie Lewczyszynová; Sofie Schindlerová	Czech Republic	192.4092	25	Did not advance	
26	María Ccoyllo; Lía Luna	Peru	187.5567	26	Did not advance	
27	Zeina Amr; Maryam Samer	Egypt	185.3659	27	Did not advance	
28	Bárbara Coppelli; Macarena Vial	Chile	182.7804	28	Did not advance	
29	Ana Culic; Thea Grima Buttigieg	Malta	173.0667	29	Did not advance	
30	Tiziana Bonucci; María Carasatorre	Argentina	168.5584	30	Did not advance	
31	Katherine Chu; Hung Sze Ching	Hong Kong	164.2558	31	Did not advance	
32	Leong Hoi Cheng; Shao Anlan	Macau	155.2513	32	Did not advance	
33	Cesia Castaneda; Grecia Mendoza	El Salvador	139.7125	33	Did not advance	
34	María Alfaro; Anna Mitinian	Costa Rica	135.2216	34	Did not advance	
35	Hilda Tri Julyandra; Talitha Amabelle Putri Subeni	Indonesia	128.2740	35	Did not advance	
36	Gabriela Batista; Alejandra Molina	Cuba	112.7179	36	Did not advance	
