= Artistic swimming at the 2025 World Aquatics Championships – Team acrobatic routine =

Team acrobatic routine at the Artistic swimming at the 2025 World Aquatics Championships
- Venue: World Aquatics Championships Arena
- Location: Singapore
- Dates: 24 July (preliminaries); 25 July (final)
- Competitors: 200 from 25 nations
- Teams: 25
- Winning points: 229.0186

Medalists
gold medal	Chang Hao; Cheng Wentao; Feng Yu; Lin Yanhan; Lin Yanjun; Xiang Binxuan; Xu Huiyan; Zhang Yayi	China
silver medal	Anna Andrianova; Anastasiia Bakhtyreva; Daria Geloshvili; Ekaterina Kossova; Elizaveta Minaeva; Evelina Simonova; Elizaveta Smirnova; Agniia Tulupova	Authorised Neutral Athletes
bronze medal	Cristina Arambula; Meritxell Ferré; Marina García Polo; Dennis González Boneu; Lilou Lluís; Meritxell Mas; Paula Ramírez; Sara Saldaña	Spain

The Team acrobatic routine competition at the 2025 World Aquatics Championships was held on 24 and 25 July 2025.

== Results ==
The preliminary round was started on 24 July 2025 at 10:02. The final was started on 25 July at 19:32.

Green denotes finalists

Rank	Nation	Preliminary		Final	
Rank	Nation	Points	Rank	Points	Rank
1st place, gold medalist(s)	China	225.7993	1	229.0186	1
2nd place, silver medalist(s)	Neutral Athlete B	201.8712	7	224.7291	2
3rd place, bronze medalist(s)	Spain	224.2870	2	221.0962	3
4	Italy	215.7280	3	217.5667	4
5	Mexico	196.4790	8	216.7876	5
6	France	190.5908	10	211.2587	6
7	Ukraine	210.1837	5	209.1731	7
8	Canada	203.1652	6	202.7948	8
9	United States	212.1612	4	198.8750	9
10	Japan	191.0638	9	193.0367	10
11	Neutral Athlete A	181.7937	12	187.3608	11
12	Kazakhstan	190.1238	11	178.1367	12
13	Israel	176.9417	13	Did not advance	
14	Greece	176.8464	14	Did not advance	
15	Egypt	173.6470	15	Did not advance	
16	Brazil	170.5412	16	Did not advance	
17	Thailand	165.9060	17	Did not advance	
18	North Korea	165.0262	18	Did not advance	
19	Slovakia	164.8533	19	Did not advance	
20	Hungary	150.2713	20	Did not advance	
21	Germany	142.7017	21	Did not advance	
22	Singapore	137.0708	22	Did not advance	
23	Hong Kong	127.1312	23	Did not advance	
24	Australia	120.5608	24	Did not advance	
25	Costa Rica	102.0533	25	Did not advance	
