= Artistic swimming at the 2025 World Aquatics Championships – Mixed duet free routine =

Mixed duet free routine at the Artistic swimming at the 2025 World Aquatics Championships
- Venue: World Aquatics Championships Arena
- Location: Singapore
- Dates: 25 July
- Competitors: 22 from 11 nations
- Teams: 11
- Winning points: 323.8563

Medalists
gold medal	Dennis González; Iris Tió	Spain
silver medal	Aleksandr Maltsev; Olesia Platonova	Authorised Neutral Athletes
bronze medal	Ranjuo Tomblin; Isabelle Thorpe	Great Britain

The Mixed duet free routine competition at the 2025 World Aquatics Championships was held on 25 July 2025.

== Results ==
The final was started at 10:02.

Rank	Swimmers	Nationality	Points
1st place, gold medalist(s)	Dennis González; Iris Tió	Spain	323.8563
2nd place, silver medalist(s)	Aleksandr Maltsev; Olesia Platonova	Neutral Athlete B	323.4438
3rd place, bronze medalist(s)	Ranjuo Tomblin; Isabelle Thorpe	Great Britain	322.0583
4	Filippo Pelati; Lucrezia Ruggiero	Italy	315.9598
5	Gustavo Sánchez; Emily Minante	Colombia	282.9484
6	Nicolás Campos; Theodora Garrido	Chile	277.8287
7	Guo Muye; Liu Jinhan	China	256.8216
8	Kantinan Adisaisiributr; Supitchaya Songpan	Thailand	254.7522
9	Frithjof Seidel; Maria Denisov	Germany	203.1574
10	José Borges; Talía Joa	Cuba	142.1834
	Eduard Kim; Nargiza Bolatova	Kazakhstan	DNS
