= Colombia at the 2025 World Aquatics Championships =

- Flag of Colombia
- World Aquatics code: COL
- National federation: Federación Colombiana de Natación
- Website: fecna.com.co

in Singapore
- Competitors: 15 in 4 sports
- Medals: Gold 0 Silver 0 Bronze 0 Total 0

World Aquatics Championships appearances
- 1973; 1975; 1978; 1982; 1986; 1991; 1994; 1998; 2001; 2003; 2005; 2007; 2009; 2011; 2013; 2015; 2017; 2019; 2022; 2023; 2024; 2025

Colombia competed at the 2025 World Aquatics Championships in Singapore from July 11 to August 3, 2025.

== Competitors ==
The following is the list of competitors in the Championships.

Sport	Men	Women	Total
Artistic swimming	1	4	5
Diving	1	3	1
High diving	2	2	4
Swimming	2	0	2
Total	6	9	15

== Artistic swimming ==
Men

Athlete	Event	Preliminaries		Final	
Athlete	Event	Points	Rank	Points	Rank
Gustavo Sánchez	Solo technical routine	—		225.1908	7
Gustavo Sánchez	Solo free routine	—		198.9025	7

Women

Athlete	Event	Preliminaries		Final	
Athlete	Event	Points	Rank	Points	Rank
Melisa Ceballos; Estefanía Roa	Duet technical routine	240.9567	20	Did not advance	
Sara Castañeda; Melisa Ceballos	Duet free routine	214.9316	17	Did not advance	

Mixed

Athlete	Event	Preliminaries		Final	
Athlete	Event	Points	Rank	Points	Rank
Gustavo Sánchez; Emily Minante	Duet technical routine	—		170.9792	12
Gustavo Sánchez; Emily Minante	Duet free routine	—		282.9484	5

== Diving ==
Men

Athlete	Event	Preliminaries		Semifinals		Final	
Athlete	Event	Points	Rank	Points	Rank	Points	Rank
Luis Uribe	3 m springboard	418.10	7 Q	429.55	6 Q	443.25	8

Women

Athlete	Event	Preliminary		Semifinal		Final	
Athlete	Event	Points	Rank	Points	Rank	Points	Rank
Juliana Giron	10 m platform	245.45	25	Did not advance			
Mariana Osorio	10 m platform	217.45	32	Did not advance			
Viviana Uribe	1 m springboard	213.20	34	—		Did not advance	
Viviana Uribe	3 m springboard	256.05	24	Did not advance			

== High diving ==
Colombia entered 4 high divers.

Men

Athlete	Event	Points	Rank
Miguel García	Men's high diving	341.45	10
Juan Gil	Men's high diving	234.60	14
María Quintero	Women's high diving	278.30	7
Isabel Pérez	Women's high diving	287.20	5

== Swimming ==
Colombia entered 2 swimmers.

Men

Athlete	Event	Heat		Semifinal		Final	
Athlete	Event	Time	Rank	Time	Rank	Time	Rank
Juan Morales	200 metre freestyle	1:48.95	36	Did not advance			
Juan Morales	400 metre freestyle	3:51.24	29	—		Did not advance	
Juan Morales	800 metre freestyle	7:59.29	19	—		Did not advance	
Jorge Murillo	50 metre breaststroke	27.77	37	Did not advance			
