= Neutral Athletes at the 2025 World Aquatics Championships =

Neutral Athletes A at the 2025 World Aquatics Championships
- World Aquatics code: NAA (Belarus)
- National federation: World Aquatics

in Singapore 11 July 2025 – 3 August 2025
- Competitors: 16 in 2 sports
- Medals Ranked 22nd: Gold 0 Silver 1 Bronze 2 Total 3

World Aquatics Championships appearances
- 1973; 1975; 1978; 1982; 1986; 1991; 1994; 1998; 2001; 2003; 2005; 2007; 2009; 2011; 2013; 2015; 2017; 2019; 2022; 2023; 2024; 2025

Neutral Athletes B at the 2025 World Aquatics Championships
- World Aquatics code: NAB (Russia)
- National federation: World Aquatics

in Singapore 11 July 2025 – 3 August 2025
- Competitors: 59 in 4 sports
- Medals Ranked 4th: Gold 6 Silver 8 Bronze 4 Total 18

World Aquatics Championships appearances
- 1973; 1975; 1978; 1982; 1986; 1991; 1994; 1998; 2001; 2003; 2005; 2007; 2009; 2011; 2013; 2015; 2017; 2019; 2022; 2023; 2024; 2025

Neutral Athletes competed at the 2025 World Aquatics Championships in Singapore, from 11 July to 3 August 2025.

== Background ==
Due to the Russian invasion of Ukraine, Russian and Belarusian athletes were barred from representing their respective countries at the Championships. Athletes from these countries could instead apply to compete as neutral athletes. If the athletes met the qualification criteria to compete as neutral athletes, which includes that they have not shown any support for the war, then they would be approved to compete. Russian athletes are competing for the "Neutral Athletes B" team.

Neutral Athletes are allowed to speak to the media, but they are not allowed to talk about any of the reasons why they are not competing for their respective countries.

== Athletes by discipline ==
The following is the number of competitors who will participate at the Championships per discipline.

Sport	Neutral Athletes A		Neutral Athletes B		Total
Sport	Belarus		Russia		Total
Sport	Men	Women	Men	Women	Total
Artistic swimming	0	11	1	12	24
Diving	0	0	6	7	13
Open water swimming	0	0	3	4	7
Swimming	2	3	18	12	35
Total	2	14	28	34*	78*

- Kseniia Misharina competed in both open water swimming and swimming.

== Medalists ==
=== Neutral Athletes A ===
Medal	Name	From	Sport	Event	Date
Silver	Vasilina Khandoshka	Belarus	Artistic swimming	Women's solo technical routine	19 July
Bronze	Vasilina Khandoshka	Belarus	Artistic swimming	Women's solo free routine	22 July
Bronze	Alina Zmushka	Belarus	Swimming	Women's 200 m breaststroke	1 August

=== Neutral Athletes B ===
Medal	Name	From	Sport	Event	Date
Gold	Aleksandr Maltsev	Russia	Artistic swimming	Men's solo technical routine	19 July
Gold	Aleksandr Maltsev	Russia	Artistic swimming	Men's solo free routine	21 July
Gold	Aleksandr Maltsev; Mayya Gurbanberdieva	Russia	Artistic swimming	Mixed duet technical routine	23 July
Gold	Daria Klepikova; Miron Lifintsev; Kirill Prigoda; Daria Trofimova; Aleksandra Kuznetsova*; Danil Semianinov*	Russia	Swimming	Mixed 4 × 100 m medley relay	30 July
Gold	Kliment Kolesnikov	Russia	Swimming	Men's 50 m backstroke	3 August
Gold	Egor Kornev; Miron Lifintsev; Andrey Minakov; Kirill Prigoda; Ivan Giryov*; Kliment Kolesnikov*; Ivan Kozhakin*	Russia	Swimming	Men's 4 × 100 m medley relay	3 August
Silver	Anna Andrianova; Anastasiia Bakhtyreva; Daria Geloshvili; Ekaterina Kossova; Elizaveta Minaeva; Evelina Simonova; Elizaveta Smirnova; Agniia Tulupova	Russia	Artistic swimming	Team technical routine	22 July
Silver	Anna Andrianova; Anastasiia Bakhtyreva; Daria Geloshvili; Ekaterina Kossova; Elizaveta Minaeva; Evelina Simonova; Elizaveta Smirnova; Agniia Tulupova	Russia	Artistic swimming	Team acrobatic routine	25 July
Silver	Aleksandr Maltsev; Olesia Platonova	Russia	Artistic swimming	Mixed duet free routine	25 July
Silver	Nikita Shleikher; Ruslan Ternovoi	Russia	Diving	Men's synchronized 10 m platform	29 July
Silver	Kirill Prigoda	Russia	Swimming	Men's 50 m breaststroke	30 July
Silver	Evgeniia Chikunova	Russia	Swimming	Women's 200 m breaststroke	1 August
Silver	Ivan Giryov; Daria Klepikova; Egor Kornev; Daria Trofimova; Alina Gaifutdinova*; Vladislav Grinev*; Milana Stepanova*	Russia	Swimming	Mixed 4 × 100 m freestyle relay	2 August
Silver	Pavel Samusenko	Russia	Swimming	Men's 50 m backstroke	3 August
Bronze	Mayya Doroshko; Tatiana Gayday	Russia	Artistic swimming	Women's duet technical routine	21 July
Bronze	Mayya Doroshko; Tatiana Gayday	Russia	Artistic swimming	Women's duet free routine	24 July
Bronze	Aleksandr Bondar; Anna Konanykhina	Russia	Diving	Mixed synchronized 10 m platform	27 July
Bronze	Ilya Borodin	Russia	Swimming	Men's 400 m individual medley	3 August

== Multiple medalists ==
Athlete	From	Sport	Gold	Silver	Bronze	Total
Aleksandr Maltsev	Russia	Artistic swimming	3	1	0	4
Kirill Prigoda	Russia	Swimming	2	1	0	3
Kliment Kolesnikov	Russia	Swimming	2	0	0	2
Miron Lifintsev	Russia	Swimming	2	0	0	2
Ivan Giryov	Russia	Swimming	1	1	0	2
Daria Klepikova	Russia	Swimming	1	1	0	2
Egor Kornev	Russia	Swimming	1	1	0	2
Daria Trofimova	Russia	Swimming	1	1	0	2
Anna Andrianova	Russia	Artistic swimming	0	2	0	2
Anastasiia Bakhtyreva	Russia	Artistic swimming	0	2	0	2
Daria Geloshvili	Russia	Artistic swimming	0	2	0	2
Ekaterina Kossova	Russia	Artistic swimming	0	2	0	2
Elizaveta Minaeva	Russia	Artistic swimming	0	2	0	2
Evelina Simonova	Russia	Artistic swimming	0	2	0	2
Elizaveta Smirnova	Russia	Artistic swimming	0	2	0	2
Agniia Tulupova	Russia	Artistic swimming	0	2	0	2
Vasilina Khandoshka	Belarus	Artistic swimming	0	1	1	2
Mayya Doroshko	Russia	Artistic swimming	0	0	2	2
Tatiana Gayday	Russia	Artistic swimming	0	0	2	2

== Artistic swimming ==
Men

Athlete	From	Event	Final	
Athlete	From	Event	Points	Rank
Aleksandr Maltsev	Russia	Solo technical routine	251.7133	1st place, gold medalist(s)
Aleksandr Maltsev	Russia	Solo free routine	229.5613	1st place, gold medalist(s)

Women

Athlete	From	Event	Preliminaries		Final	
Athlete	From	Event	Points	Rank	Points	Rank
Vasilina Khandoshka	Belarus	Solo technical	254.8200	2 Q	260.5416	2nd place, silver medalist(s)
Vasilina Khandoshka	Belarus	Solo free routine	238.2762	2 Q	239.5437	3rd place, bronze medalist(s)
Daria Fedaruk; Vasilina Khandoshka	Belarus	Duet technical routine	262.8175	12 Q	277.4267	7
Daria Fedaruk; Vasilina Khandoshka	Belarus	Duet free routine	203.2920	20	Did not advance	
Tatiana Gayday	Russia	Solo technical	246.0517	7 Q	228.5625	12
Mayya Doroshko; Tatiana Gayday	Russia	Duet technical routine	297.0033	3 Q	300.2183	3rd place, bronze medalist(s)
Mayya Doroshko; Tatiana Gayday	Russia	Duet free routine	269.4688	2 Q	277.1117	3rd place, bronze medalist(s)

Mixed

Athlete	From	Event	Preliminaries		Final	
Athlete	From	Event	Points	Rank	Points	Rank
Anastasiya Bernat (F); Anastasiya Dabravolskaya; Volha Dzemidovich; Marharyta Kiryliuk; Varvara Kulba (T, A); Kseniya Kuliashova; Aliaksandra Mironchyk; Valeryia Shymanskaya; Yana Tratseuskaya	Belarus	Team technical routine	255.7183	7 Q	259.7317	10
Anastasiya Bernat (F); Anastasiya Dabravolskaya; Volha Dzemidovich; Marharyta Kiryliuk; Varvara Kulba (T, A); Kseniya Kuliashova; Aliaksandra Mironchyk; Valeryia Shymanskaya; Yana Tratseuskaya	Belarus	Team free routine	271.5473	7 Q	274.9779	8
Anastasiya Bernat (F); Anastasiya Dabravolskaya; Volha Dzemidovich; Marharyta Kiryliuk; Varvara Kulba (T, A); Kseniya Kuliashova; Aliaksandra Mironchyk; Valeryia Shymanskaya; Yana Tratseuskaya	Belarus	Team acrobatic routine	181.7937	12 Q	187.3608	11
Mayya Gurbanberdieva; Aleksandr Maltsev	Russia	Duet technical routine	—N/a		233.2100	1st place, gold medalist(s)
Aleksandr Maltsev; Olesia Platonova	Russia	Duet free routine	—N/a		323.4438	2nd place, silver medalist(s)
Anna Andrianova; Anastasiia Bakhtyreva; Daria Geloshvili; Ekaterina Kossova; Elizaveta Minaeva; Evelina Simonova; Elizaveta Smirnova; Agniia Tulupova	Russia	Team technical routine	295.4633	2 Q	300.6183	2nd place, silver medalist(s)
Anna Andrianova; Anastasiia Bakhtyreva; Daria Geloshvili; Ekaterina Kossova; Elizaveta Minaeva; Evelina Simonova; Elizaveta Smirnova; Agniia Tulupova	Russia	Team acrobatic routine	201.8712	7 Q	224.7291	2nd place, silver medalist(s)

== Diving ==
Men

Athlete	From	Event	Preliminaries		Semifinal		Final	
Athlete	From	Event	Points	Rank	Points	Rank	Points	Rank
Gennadii Fokin	Russia	1 m springboard	359.75	8 Q	—N/a		381.00	8
Egor Lapin	Russia	1 m springboard	313.40	29	—N/a		Did not advance	
Ilia Molchanov	Russia	3 m springboard	394.80	11 Q	397.05	11 Q	440.25	9
Nikita Shleikher	Russia	3 m springboard	445.15	4 Q	427.70	7 Q	452.75	7
Gennadii Fokin; Ilia Molchanov	Russia	3 m synchronized springboard	358.80	12	—N/a		Did not advance	
Nikita Shleikher	Russia	10 m platform	448.70	6 Q	464.60	6 Q	441.80	11
Ruslan Ternovoi	Russia	10 m platform	434.65	9 Q	458.55	7 Q	459.05	7
Nikita Shleikher; Ruslan Ternovoi	Russia	10 m synchronized platform	407.91	2 Q	—N/a		428.70	2nd place, silver medalist(s)

Women

Athlete	From	Event	Preliminaries		Semifinal		Final	
Athlete	From	Event	Points	Rank	Points	Rank	Points	Rank
Viktoriia Frolova	Russia	1 m springboard	214.00	33	—N/a		Did not advance	
Kristina Ilinykh	Russia	1 m springboard	244.70	10 Q	—N/a		261.85	6
Kristina Ilinykh	Russia	3 m springboard	291.00	9 Q	308.30	5 Q	310.30	7
Elizaveta Kuzina	Russia	3 m springboard	249.20	28	Did not advance			
Kristina Ilinykh; Elizaveta Kuzina	Russia	3 m synchronized springboard	208.80	16	—N/a		Did not advance	
Ekaterina Beliaeva	Russia	10 m platform	308.70	5 Q	293.00	10	335.10	7
Yulia Timoshinina	Russia	10 m platform	273.25	16 Q	246.95	16	Did not advance	
Aleksandra Kedrina; Anna Konanykhina	Russia	10 m synchronized platform	280.62	6 Q	—N/a		269.46	7

Mixed

Athlete	From	Event	Final	
Athlete	From	Event	Points	Rank
Elizaveta Kuzina; Ilia Molchanov	Russia	3 m synchronized springboard	273.84	5
Aleksandr Bondar; Anna Konanykhina	Russia	10 m synchronized platform	311.88	3rd place, bronze medalist(s)
Elizaveta Kuzina; Ilia Molchanov; Ruslan Ternovoi; Yulia Timoshinina	Russia	Team event	400.35	5

== Open water swimming ==
Men

Athlete	From	Event	Heat		Semifinal		Final	
Athlete	From	Event	Time	Rank	Time	Rank	Time	Rank
Denis Adeev	Russia	5 km	—N/a				57:37.2	5
Denis Adeev	Russia	10 km	—N/a				2:00:35.8	6
Savelii Luzin	Russia	3 km knockout sprints	17:11.1	14	Did not advance			
Savelii Luzin	Russia	5 km	—N/a				1:01:04.9	29
Vladislav Utrobin	Russia	3 km knockout sprints	17:11.5	10 Q	11:34.3	15	Did not advance	
Vladislav Utrobin	Russia	10 km	—N/a				2:09:27.7	35

Women

Athlete	From	Event	Heat		Semifinal		Final	
Athlete	From	Event	Time	Rank	Time	Rank	Time	Rank
Margarita Ershova	Russia	3 km knockout sprints	18:15.10	9 Q	12:10.9	6 Q	6:26.9	8
Margarita Ershova	Russia	10 km	—N/a				Did not finish	
Polina Koziakina	Russia	5 km	—N/a				1:05:24.0	24
Kseniia Misharina	Russia	3 km knockout sprints	18:33.3	1 Q	12:11.1	7 Q	6:30.3	10
Ekaterina Sorokina	Russia	5 km	—N/a				1:04:09.7	14
Ekaterina Sorokina	Russia	10 km	—N/a				2:09:39.8	11

Mixed

Athlete	From	Event	Time	Rank
Margarita Ershova; Kseniia Misharina; Savelii Luzin; Denis Adeev	Russia	Team relay	1:10:24.0	6

== Swimming ==
Men

Athlete	From	Event	Heat		Semifinal		Final	
Athlete	From	Event	Time	Rank	Time	Rank	Time	Rank
Grigori Pekarski	Belarus	50 m butterfly	23.42	24	Did not advance			
Grigori Pekarski	Belarus	100 m butterfly	52.90	35	Did not advance			
Ilya Shymanovich	Belarus	50 m breaststroke	26.89	8 Q	26.94	10	Did not advance	
Ilya Shymanovich	Belarus	100 m breaststroke	59.59	11 Q	59.44	12	Did not advance	
Mikhail Antipov	Russia	100 m butterfly	52.26	30	Did not advance			
Ilya Borodin	Russia	200 m individual medley	1:58.01	6 Q	1:57.67	11	Did not advance	
Ilya Borodin	Russia	400 m individual medley	4:10.63	3 Q	—N/a		4:09.16	3rd place, bronze medalist(s)
Egor Iurchenko	Russia	50 m butterfly	23.44	25	Did not advance			
Kliment Kolesnikov	Russia	50 m freestyle	21.95	18	Did not advance			
Kliment Kolesnikov	Russia	50 m backstroke	24.08	1 Q	24.16	1 Q	23.68	1st place, gold medalist(s)
Kliment Kolesnikov	Russia	100 m backstroke	52.57	2 Q	52.26	2 Q	52.38	6
Egor Kornev	Russia	50 m freestyle	21.52	2 Q	21.51	4 Q	21.53	5
Egor Kornev	Russia	100 m freestyle	47.51	3 Q	47.29	3 Q	47.51	5
Oleg Kostin	Russia	50 m butterfly	23.34	19	Did not advance			
Ivan Kozhakin	Russia	50 m breaststroke	26.77	5 Q	26.66	3 Q	26.73	4
Miron Lifintsev	Russia	100 m backstroke	52.77	6 Q	52.57	8 Q	52.51	7
Andrey Minakov	Russia	100 m freestyle	48.48	19	Did not advance			
Andrey Minakov	Russia	100 m butterfly	50.93	3 Q	50.87	7 Q	50.90	6
Kirill Prigoda	Russia	50 m breaststroke	26.76	4 Q	26.92	7 Q	26.62	2nd place, silver medalist(s)
Kirill Prigoda	Russia	100 m breaststroke	58.53	1 Q	59.36	8 Q	Disqualified	
Kirill Prigoda	Russia	200 m breaststroke	2:10.46	7 Q	2:08.91	7 Q	2:07.99	4
Pavel Samusenko	Russia	50 m backstroke	24.66	7 Q	24.31	2 Q	24.17	= (silver)
Dmitrii Savenko	Russia	200 m backstroke	2:00.20	29	Did not advance			
Danil Semianinov	Russia	100 m breaststroke	59.92	14 Q	59.39	9 Q	59.55	8
Maxim Stupin	Russia	400 m individual medley	4:11.53	5 Q	—N/a		4:12.46	5
Aleksandr Zhigalov	Russia	200 m breaststroke	2:08.32	1 Q	2:08.55	6 Q	Disqualified	
Kliment Kolesnikov; Vladislav Grinev; Ivan Giryov; Vasilii Kukushkin	Russia	4 × 100 m freestyle relay	3:12.87	9	—N/a		Did not advance	
Miron Lifintsev; Kirill Prigoda; Andrey Minakov; Egor Kornev; Kliment Kolesnikov*; Ivan Kozhakin*; Ivan Girev*	Russia	4 × 100 m medley relay	3:30.05	2 Q	—N/a		3:26.93	1st place, gold medalist(s)

Women

Athlete	From	Event	Heat		Semifinal		Final	
Athlete	From	Event	Time	Rank	Time	Rank	Time	Rank
Anastasiya Kuliashova	Belarus	50 m butterfly	26.79	23	Did not advance			
Anastasiya Kuliashova	Belarus	100 m butterfly	58.52	19	Did not advance			
Anastasiya Shkurdai	Belarus	100 m backstroke	1:00.11	13 Q	1:00.46	15	Did not advance	
Anastasiya Shkurdai	Belarus	200 m backstroke	2:08.96	6 Q	2:07.85	2 Q	2:08.09	5
Alina Zmushka	Belarus	50 m breaststroke	30.82	19	Did not advance			
Alina Zmushka	Belarus	100 m breaststroke	1:06.96	16 Q	1:06.09	5 Q	1:06.38	7
Alina Zmushka	Belarus	200 m breaststroke	2:24.24	3 Q	2:23.33	5 Q	2:23.52	= (bronze)
Evgeniia Chikunova	Russia	50 m breaststroke	31.34	26	Did not advance			
Evgeniia Chikunova	Russia	100 m breaststroke	1:06.19	4 Q	1:05.97	4 Q	1:06.04	5
Evgeniia Chikunova	Russia	200 m breaststroke	2:22.30	1 Q	2:20.65	1 Q	2:19.96	2nd place, silver medalist(s)
Sofia Diakova	Russia	400 m freestyle	4:08.65	10	—N/a		Did not advance	
Sofia Diakova	Russia	800 m freestyle	8:33.16	14	—N/a		Did not advance	
Alina Gaifutdinova	Russia	50 m backstroke	27.57	2 Q	27.57	8 Q	27.44	6
Alina Gaifutdinova	Russia	100 m backstroke	1:00.56	16 Q	59.93	13	Did not advance	
Daria Klepikova	Russia	100 m freestyle	53.55	4 Q	53.14	3 Q	52.98	5
Daria Klepikova	Russia	100 m butterfly	57.29	8 Q	56.42	4 Q	56.53	5
Aleksandra Kuznetsova	Russia	50 m freestyle	25.55	31	Did not advance			
Kseniia Misharina	Russia	800 m freestyle	8:35.94	16	—N/a		Did not advance	
Kseniia Misharina	Russia	1500 m freestyle	16:12.35	12	—N/a		Did not advance	
Mariia Osetrova	Russia	50 m butterfly	26.37	23	Did not advance			
Milana Stepanova	Russia	200 m backstroke	2:10.60	17 Q	2:09.57	11	Did not advance	
Arina Surkova	Russia	50 m freestyle	24.64	10 Q	24.64	13	Did not advance	
Arina Surkova	Russia	50 m butterfly	25.56	4 Q	25.54	5 Q	25.59	5
Daria Trofimova	Russia	100 m freestyle	54.14	13 Q	54.21	13	Did not advance	
Daria Zarubenkova	Russia	200 m backstroke	2:10.35	16 Q	2:10.92	16	Did not advance	
Daria Trofimova; Aleksandra Kuznetsova; Alina Gaifutdinova; Daria Klepikova; Daria Surushkina*	Russia	4 × 100 m freestyle relay	3:35.95	6 Q	—N/a		3:34.69	6
Alina Gaifutdinova; Evgeniia Chikunova; Daria Klepikova; Daria Trofimova; Arina Surkova*; Milana Stepanova*	Russia	4 × 100 m medley relay	3:59.36	8 Q	—N/a		3:55.17	4

Mixed

Athlete	From	Event	Heat		Final	
Athlete	From	Event	Time	Rank	Time	Rank
Egor Kornev; Ivan Giryov; Daria Trofimova; Daria Klepikova; Vladislav Grinev*; Alina Gaifutdinova*; Milana Stepanova*	Russia	4 × 100 m freestyle relay	3:24.46	4 Q	3:19.68	2nd place, silver medalist(s)
Miron Lifintsev; Kirill Prigoda; Daria Klepikova; Daria Trofimova; Danil Semianinov*; Aleksandra Kuznetsova*	Russia	4 × 100 m medley relay	3:44.14	7 Q	3:37.97	1st place, gold medalist(s)
