= Cuba at the 2025 World Aquatics Championships =

- Flag of Cuba
- World Aquatics code: CUB
- National federation: Federación Cubana de Natación

in Singapore
- Competitors: 11 in 3 sports
- Medals: Gold 0 Silver 0 Bronze 0 Total 0

World Aquatics Championships appearances
- 1973; 1975; 1978; 1982; 1986; 1991; 1994; 1998; 2001; 2003; 2005; 2007; 2009; 2011; 2013; 2015; 2017; 2019; 2022; 2023; 2024; 2025

Cuba is competing at the 2025 World Aquatics Championships in Singapore from 11 July to 3 August 2025.

== Competitors ==
The following is the list of competitors in the Championships.

Sport	Men	Women	Total
Artistic swimming	1	3	4
Diving	3	1	4
Swimming	1	2	3
Total	5	6	11

== Artistic swimming ==
Men

Athlete	Event	Final	
Athlete	Event	Points	Rank
José Borges	Solo free	86.6687	14

Women

Athlete	Event	Preliminary		Final	
Athlete	Event	Points	Rank	Points	Rank
Talía Joa	Solo technical	151.5376	35	Did not advance	
Talía Joa	Solo free	91.7500	30	Did not advance	
Gabriela Batista; Alejandra Molina	Duet technical	166.1010	38	Did not advance	
Gabriela Batista; Alejandra Molina	Duet free	112.7179	36	Did not advance	

Mixed

Athlete	Event	Final	
Athlete	Event	Points	Rank
José Borges; Talía Joa	Duet technical	120.8859	13
José Borges; Talía Joa	Duet free	142.1834	10

== Diving ==
Men

Athlete	Event	Preliminary		Semifinal		Final	
Athlete	Event	Points	Rank	Points	Rank	Points	Rank
Frank Rosales	1 m springboard	334.10	20	—		Did not advance	
Frank Rosales	3 m springboard	339.75	41	Did not advance			
Bernaldo Arias	10 m platform	288.20	44	Did not advance			
Carlos Ramos	10 m platform	354.15	29	Did not advance			
Bernaldo Arias; Carlos Ramos	10 m synchronized platform	320.43	16	—		Did not advance	

Women

Athlete	Event	Preliminary		Semifinal		Final	
Athlete	Event	Points	Rank	Points	Rank	Points	Rank
Anisley García	3 m springboard	278.70	13 Q	248.30	16	Did not advance	
Anisley García	10 m platform	251.75	20	Did not advance			

Mixed

Athlete	Event	Final	
Athlete	Event	Points	Rank
Anisley García; Carlos Ramos	10 m synchronized platform	267.78	9
Bernaldo Arias; Anisley García; Carlos Ramos; Frank Rosales	Team	343.85	11

== Swimming ==
Men

Athlete	Event	Heat		Final	
Athlete	Event	Time	Rank	Time	Rank
Vladimir Hernandez	400 m freestyle	4:11.70	42	Did not advance	
Vladimir Hernandez	800 m freestyle	8:41.26	26	Did not advance	

Women

Athlete	Event	Heat		Semifinal		Final	
Athlete	Event	Time	Rank	Time	Rank	Time	Rank
Andrea Becali	100 m freestyle	57.05	38	Did not advance			
Andrea Becali	200 m freestyle	2:07.65	39	Did not advance			
Laurent Estrada	50 m backstroke	30.24	41	Did not advance			
Laurent Estrada	100 m backstroke	1:03.72	37	Did not advance			
