= Artistic swimming at the 2025 World Aquatics Championships – Men's solo technical routine =

Men's solo technical routine at the Artistic swimming at the 2025 World Aquatics Championships
- Venue: World Aquatics Championships Arena
- Location: Singapore
- Dates: 19 July
- Competitors: 13 from 13 nations
- Winning points: 251.7133

Medalists
gold medal	Aleksandr Maltsev	Authorised Neutral Athletes
silver medal	Dennis González	Spain
bronze medal	Diego Villalobos	Mexico

The Men's solo technical routine competition at the 2025 World Aquatics Championships was held on 19 July 2025.

== Results ==
The final was started at 14:02.

Rank	Swimmer	Nationality	Points
1st place, gold medalist(s)	Aleksandr Maltsev	Neutral Athletes B	251.7133
2nd place, silver medalist(s)	Dennis González	Spain	241.1667
3rd place, bronze medalist(s)	Diego Villalobos	Mexico	238.1600
4	Guo Muye	China	235.0725
5	Ranjuo Tomblin	Great Britain	228.4316
6	Filippo Pelati	Italy	228.0800
7	Gustavo Sánchez	Colombia	225.1908
8	Nicolás Campos	Chile	220.6167
9	Eduard Kim	Kazakhstan	217.7084
10	Marios Critsas	Greece	195.2258
11	David Martinez	Sweden	195.0033
12	Kantinan Adisaisiributr	Thailand	192.4416
13	Bernardo Barreto	Brazil	186.4083
