= Artistic swimming at the 2025 World Aquatics Championships – Team technical routine =

Team technical routine at the Artistic swimming at the 2025 World Aquatics Championships
- Venue: World Aquatics Championships Arena
- Location: Singapore
- Dates: 21 July (preliminaries); 22 July (final)
- Competitors: 209 from 26 nations
- Teams: 26
- Winning points: 307.8001

Medalists
gold medal	Chang Hao; Cheng Wentao; Dai Shiyi; Feng Yu; Li Xiuchen; Lin Yanjun; Xiang Binxuan; Xu Huiyan	China
silver medal	Anna Andrianova; Anastasiia Bakhtyreva; Daria Geloshvili; Ekaterina Kossova; Elizaveta Minaeva; Evelina Simonova; Elizaveta Smirnova; Agniia Tulupova
bronze medal	Cristina Arambula; Meritxell Ferré; Marina García; Lilou Lluís; Alisa Ozhogina; Paula Ramírez; Sara Saldaña; Iris Tió; Mireia Hernández	Spain

The Team technical routine competition at the 2025 World Aquatics Championships was held on 21 and 22 July 2025.

== Results ==
The preliminary round was started on 21 July 2025 at 10:02. The final was held on 22 July at 18:32.

Green denotes finalists

Rank	Nation	Preliminary		Final	
Rank	Nation	Points	Rank	Points	Rank
1st place, gold medalist(s)	China	306.2460	1	307.8001	1
2nd place, silver medalist(s)	Neutral Athlete B	295.4633	2	300.6183	2
3rd place, bronze medalist(s)	Spain	288.4091	3	294.8575	3
4	Japan	265.7967	6	282.4134	4
5	Italy	278.0758	4	282.3191	5
6	United States	238.5699	12	273.6650	6
7	Ukraine	268.9901	5	273.0525	7
8	France	249.3725	8	270.3816	8
9	Canada	244.3817	10	266.5116	9
10	Neutral Athlete A	255.7183	7	259.7317	10
11	Greece	247.2800	9	255.4266	11
12	Israel	241.8292	11	245.2975	12
13	Egypt	237.4850	13	Did not advance	
14	Kazakhstan	230.8467	14	Did not advance	
15	Slovakia	229.8708	15	Did not advance	
16	Chile	228.0433	16	Did not advance	
17	Great Britain	227.8151	17	Did not advance	
18	Australia	224.8300	18	Did not advance	
19	North Korea	223.2442	19	Did not advance	
20	Brazil	219.6482	20	Did not advance	
21	Hungary	217.8617	21	Did not advance	
22	Thailand	204.3100	22	Did not advance	
23	Singapore	200.6333	23	Did not advance	
24	Hong Kong	177.0934	24	Did not advance	
25	South Africa	139.1717	25	Did not advance	
26	Indonesia	136.4583	26	Did not advance	
