= Artistic swimming at the 2026 European Aquatics Championships – Team acrobatic routine =

Team acrobatic routine at the 2026 European Aquatics Championships
- Venue: Paris Aquatic Centre
- Dates: 5 August
- Competitors: 64 from 8 nations
- Teams: 8
- Winning points: 244.8221

Medalists
gold medal	Mayya Doroshko; Ekaterina Kossova; Elizaveta Minaeva; Valeriia Plekhanova; Elena Shabanova; Evelina Simonova; Elizaveta Smirnova; Olga Tiutiunik	Authorised Neutral Athletes
silver medal	Cristina Arámbula; Meritxell Ferré; Marina García; Dennis González; Lilou Lluís; Paula Ramírez; Sara Saldaña; Iris Tió	Spain
bronze medal	Beatrice Andina; Valentina Bisi; Marta Iacoacci; Alessia Macchi; Giorgia Macino; Sofia Mastroianni; Susanna Pedotti; Giulia Vernice	Italy

The Team acrobatic routine competition at the 2026 European Aquatics Championships was held on 5 August 2026.

== Results ==
The final was started at 16:00.

Rank	Nation	Points
1st place, gold medalist(s)	Neutral Athletes B Mayya Doroshko; Ekaterina Kossova; Elizaveta Minaeva; Valeriia Plekhanova; Elena Shabanova; Evelina Simonova; Elizaveta Smirnova; Olga Tiutiunik	244.8221
2nd place, silver medalist(s)	Spain; Cristina Arámbula; Meritxell Ferré; Marina García; Dennis González; Lilou Lluís; Paula Ramírez; Sara Saldaña; Iris Tió	242.2428
3rd place, bronze medalist(s)	Italy; Beatrice Andina; Valentina Bisi; Marta Iacoacci; Alessia Macchi; Giorgia Macino; Sofia Mastroianni; Susanna Pedotti; Giulia Vernice	219.2545
4	Ukraine; Mariia Hrynishyna; Uliana Hrynishyna; Yelyzaveta Lymar; Daria Moshynska; Anastasiia Shmonina; Ameliia Volynska; Mariia Zachepa; Mariia Zdorovtsova	212.9099
5	Greece; Maria Amerali; Thaleia Dampali; Olga Imvrioti; Ismini Karavasili; Stylianos Koukouselis Fouskis; Sofia Malkogeorgou; Vasiliki Thanou; Danai Tsaprali	206.8142
6	Israel; Yogev Dagan; Catherine Kunin; Alexandra Lerman; Noga Levy; Lior Makmel; Shaya Sar Shalom Nechmad; Yaara Sharabi; Ella Stiner	188.4286
7	Portugal; Marta Abreu; Daniel Ascenso; Lara Botelho; Rodrigo Carvalho; Maria Fonseca; Elisabete Fortunato; Lara Rolo; Joana Rosa	145.4944
8	Bulgaria; Iren Davidkova; Raya Furnadzhieva; Magdalena Maleva; Taisia Nikolaenko; Valentina Troanska; Maria Valeva; Viktoria Vekova; Lora Zheynova	141.6790
