= Artistic swimming at the 2026 European Aquatics Championships – Team free routine =

Team free routine at the 2026 European Aquatics Championships
- Venue: Paris Aquatic Centre
- Dates: 2 August (preliminary); 3 August (final)
- Competitors: 65 from 8 nations
- Teams: 8
- Winning points: 285.0346

Medalists
| gold medal | Kira Cherezova; Mayya Doroshko; Ekaterina Kossova; Elizaveta Minaeva; Svetlana Pavlova; Elena Shabanova; Elizaveta Smirnova; Olga Tiutiunik | Authorised Neutral Athletes |
| silver medal | Cristina Arámbula; Meritxell Ferré; Marina García; Mireia Hernández; Aurora Lázaro; Lilou Lluís; Alisa Ozhogina; Sara Saldaña | Spain |
| bronze medal | Beatrice Andina; Valentina Bisi; Beatrice Esegio; Marta Iacoacci; Alessia Macchi; Sofia Mastroianni; Susanna Pedotti; Giulia Vernice | Italy |

The Team free routine competition at the 2026 European Aquatics Championships was held on 2 and 3 August 2026.

== Results ==
The preliminary round was started on 2 August at 09:00. The final was started on 3 August at 16:00.

| Rank | Nation | Preliminary | | Final | |
| Rank | Nation | Points | Rank | Points | Rank |
|---|---|---|---|---|---|
| 1st place, gold medalist(s) | Neutral Athletes B Kira Cherezova; Mayya Doroshko; Ekaterina Kossova; Elizaveta Minaeva; Svetlana Pavlova; Elena Shabanova; Elizaveta Smirnova; Olga Tiutiunik | 272.7400 | 1 | 285.0346 | 1 |
| 2nd place, silver medalist(s) | Spain; Cristina Arámbula; Meritxell Ferré; Marina García; Mireia Hernández; Aurora Lázaro; Lilou Lluís; Alisa Ozhogina; Sara Saldaña | 266.5275 | 2 | 282.3541 | 2 |
| 3rd place, bronze medalist(s) | Italy; Beatrice Andina; Valentina Bisi; Beatrice Esegio; Marta Iacoacci; Alessia Macchi; Sofia Mastroianni; Susanna Pedotti; Giulia Vernice | 235.7041 | 3 | 256.1558 | 3 |
| 4 | Greece; Thaleia Dampali; Olga Imvrioti; Ismini Karavasili; Stylianos Koukouselis Fouskis; Sofia Malkogeorgou; Vasiliki Thanou; Danai Tsaprali; Georgia Zangana | 220.6266 | 4 | 234.5287 | 4 |
| 5 | France; Laëlys Alavez; Anastasia Bayandina; Angeline Bertinelli; Jeanne Clair; Claudia Janvier; Romane Lunel; Prune Tapié; Milan Violon | 203.1195 | 7 | 232.5472 | 5 |
| 6 | Ukraine; Mariia Hrynishyna; Uliana Hrynishyna; Yelyzaveta Lymar; Daria Moshynska; Daria Prynko; Anastasiia Shmonina; Ameliia Volynska; Mariia Zachepa | 205.7788 | 6 | 220.9466 | 6 |
| 7 | Israel; Yogev Dagan; Catherine Kunin; Alexandra Lerman; Noga Levy; Lior Makmel; Liya Makmel; Aya Mazor; Noya Tzarfati | 206.4693 | 5 | 214.2970 | 7 |
| 8 | Great Britain; Anastasia Appleby; Loya Cenkci; Hannah Gibbons; Holly Hughes; Molly Hussey; Pia Lanham (PR); Imogen Sutton; Magdalena Townsend; Eve Young (F) | 190.4655 | 8 | 193.5646 | 8 |
