= Chile at the 2025 World Aquatics Championships =

- Flag of Chile
- World Aquatics code: CHI
- National federation: Chilean Federation of Aquatics Sport

in Singapore
- Competitors: 14 in 3 sports
- Medals: Gold 0 Silver 0 Bronze 0 Total 0

World Aquatics Championships appearances
- 1973; 1975; 1978; 1982; 1986; 1991; 1994; 1998; 2001; 2003; 2005; 2007; 2009; 2011; 2013; 2015; 2017; 2019; 2022; 2023; 2024; 2025

Chile competed at the 2025 World Aquatics Championships in Singapore from July 11 to August 3, 2025.

== Competitors ==
The following is the list of competitors in the Championships.

Sport	Men	Women	Total
Artistic swimming	1	9	10
Diving	1	0	1
Swimming	2	1	3
Total	4	10	14

== Artistic swimming ==
Men

Athlete	Event	Preliminaries		Final	
Athlete	Event	Points	Rank	Points	Rank
Nicolás Campos	Solo technical routine	—		220.6167	8
Nicolás Campos	Solo free routine	—		179.2325	9

Women

Athlete	Event	Preliminaries		Final	
Athlete	Event	Points	Rank	Points	Rank
Soledad García; Trinidad García	Duet technical routine	238.8183	22	Did not advance	
Bárbara Coppelli; Macarena Vial	Duet free routine	182.7804	28	Did not advance	

Mixed

Athlete	Event	Preliminaries		Final	
Athlete	Event	Points	Rank	Points	Rank
Nicolás Campos; Theodora Garrido	Duet technical routine	—		199.7834	8
Nicolás Campos; Theodora Garrido	Duet free routine	—		277.8287	6
Dominga Cerda; Dominga Cesped; Bárbara Coppelli; Soledad García; Theodora Garrido; Josefa Oravec; Chloe Plaut; Macarena Via	Team technical routine	228.0433	16	Did not advance	
Nicolás Campos; Dominga Cerda; Dominga Cesped; Bárbara Coppelli; Theodora Garrido; Josefa Oravec; Chloe Plaut; Macarena Via	Team technical routine	235.4976	12 Q	240.6881	11

== Diving ==
Men

Athlete	Event	Preliminaries		Semifinals		Final	
Athlete	Event	Points	Rank	Points	Rank	Points	Rank
Donato Neglia	1 m springboard	238.00	22	—		Did not advance	
Donato Neglia	3 m springboard	284.40	57	—		Did not advance	

== Swimming ==
Chile entered 3 swimmers.

Men

Athlete	Event	Heat		Semifinal		Final	
Athlete	Event	Time	Rank	Time	Rank	Time	Rank
Mariano Lazzerini	100 metre breaststroke	1:01.89	39	Did not advance			
Mariano Lazzerini	200 metre breaststroke	2:14.61	26	Did not advance			
Edhy Vargas	100 metre backstroke	56.59	45	Did not advance			
Edhy Vargas	200 metre backstroke	2:02.29	34	Did not advance			

Women

Athlete	Event	Heat		Semifinal		Final	
Athlete	Event	Time	Rank	Time	Rank	Time	Rank
Kristel Köbrich	800 metre freestyle	8:39.78	18	—		Did not advance	
Kristel Köbrich	1500 metre freestyle	16:22.66	14	—		Did not advance	
