= Artistic swimming at the 2022 European Aquatics Championships – Duet technical routine =

Duet technical routine at the 2022 European Aquatics Championships
- Venue: Foro Italico
- Dates: 15 August
- Competitors: 36 from 18 nations
- Winning points: 92.8538

Medalists
gold medal	Maryna Aleksiiva; Vladyslava Aleksiiva	Ukraine
silver medal	Anna-Maria Alexandri; Eirini-Marina Alexandri	Austria
bronze medal	Linda Cerruti; Costanza Ferro	Italy

The Duet technical routine competition of the 2022 European Aquatics Championships was held on 15 August 2022.

== Results ==
The preliminary round was held on 15 August at 09:30.

Rank	Swimmers	Nationality	Points
1st place, gold medalist(s)	Ukraine	Maryna Aleksiiva; Vladyslava Aleksiiva	92.8538
2nd place, silver medalist(s)	Austria	Anna-Maria Alexandri; Eirini-Marina Alexandri	91.9852
3rd place, bronze medalist(s)	Italy	Linda Cerruti; Costanza Ferro	90.3577
4	Greece	Sofia Malkogeorgou; Evangelia Platanioti	88.4669
5	Netherlands	Bregje de Brouwer; Marloes Steenbeek	85.9743
6	Israel	Shelly Bobritsky; Ariel Nassee	84.3681
7	Great Britain	Kate Shortman; Isabelle Thorpe	84.2598
8	Germany	Marlene Bojer; Michelle Zimmer	83.6096
9	Switzerland	Ilona Fahrni; Babou Schupbach	81.1615
10	San Marino	Jasmine Verbena; Jasmine Zonzini	79.3951
11	Czech Republic	Karolína Klusková; Aneta Mrázková	78.0686
12	Hungary	Linda Farkas; Boglárka Gács	76.5595
13	Bulgaria	Nia Atanasova; Dalia Penkova	74.9435
14	Serbia	Sofija Džipković; Jelena Kontić	73.8506
15	Denmark	Karoline Christensen; Mia Heide	68.7978
16	Sweden	Anna Hogdal; Clara Ternstrom	68.5743
17	Malta	Thea Blake; Ana Culic	64.3190
18	Turkey	Ece Üngör; Selin Telci	63.1037
