= Artistic swimming at the 2022 European Aquatics Championships – Duet free routine =

Duet free routine at the 2022 European Aquatics Championships
- Venue: Foro Italico
- Dates: 12 August (preliminary); 13 August (final)
- Competitors: 36 from 18 nations
- Winning points: 94.7333

Medalists
gold medal	Maryna Aleksiiva; Vladyslava Aleksiiva	Ukraine
silver medal	Anna-Maria Alexandri; Eirini-Marina Alexandri	Austria
bronze medal	Linda Cerruti; Costanza Ferro	Italy

The Duet free routine competition of the 2022 European Aquatics Championships was held on 12 and 13 August 2022.

== Results ==
The preliminary round was held on 12 August at 09:30. The final round was held on 13 August at 15:00.

Rank	Nation	Swimmers	Preliminary		Final	
Rank	Nation	Swimmers	Points	Rank	Points	Rank
1st place, gold medalist(s)	Ukraine	Maryna Aleksiiva; Vladyslava Aleksiiva	94.3667	1	94.7333	1
2nd place, silver medalist(s)	Austria	Anna-Maria Alexandri; Eirini-Marina Alexandri	92.6000	2	93.0000	2
3rd place, bronze medalist(s)	Italy	Linda Cerruti; Costanza Ferro	90.6667	3	91.7000	3
4	Greece	Sofia Malkogeorgou; Evangelia Platanioti	90.0000	4	90.2667	4
5	Netherlands	Bregje de Brouwer; Marloes Steenbeek	86.1000	5	87.1667	5
6	Israel	Shelly Bobritsky; Ariel Nassee	85.0667	6	86.0333	6
7	Great Britain	Kate Shortman; Isabelle Thorpe	83.9667	7	84.9667	7
8	Germany	Marlene Bojer; Michelle Zimmer	83.7333	8	83.6337	8
9	Portugal	Maria da Silva Jorge; Cheila Vieira	80.9667	9	81.2000	9
10	San Marino	Jasmine Verbena; Jasmine Zonzini	80.6333	10	81.100	10
11	Liechtenstein	Noemi Büchel; Nadina Klauser	78.5333	11	79.4000	11
12	Czech Republic	Karolína Klusková; Aneta Mrázková	77.5333	12	77.5333	12
13	Serbia	Sofija Džipković; Jelena Kontić	75.6000	13	did not advance	
14	Croatia	Antonija Huljev; Klara Šilobodec	75.6000	14	did not advance	
15	Bulgaria	Nia Atanasova; Dalia Penkova	74.6667	15	did not advance	
16	Sweden	Anna Högdal; Clara Ternström	78.5333	16	did not advance	
17	Denmark	Karoline Christensen; Mia Heide	71.1000	17	did not advance	
18	Turkey	Selin Telci; Ece Üngör	70.9333	18	did not advance	
