= Artistic swimming at the 2026 European Aquatics Championships – Team technical routine =

Team technical routine at the 2026 European Aquatics Championships
- Venue: Paris Aquatic Centre
- Dates: 4 August
- Competitors: 80 from 10 nations
- Teams: 10
- Winning points: 303.2467

Medalists
gold medal	Kira Cherezova; Valentina Gerasimova; Ekaterina Kossova; Svetlana Pavlova; Elena Shabanova; Aleksandra Shmidt; Elizaveta Smirnova; Olga Tiutiunik	Authorised Neutral Athletes
silver medal	Cristina Arámbula; Meritxell Ferré; Marina García; Mireia Hernández; Aurora Lázaro; Lilou Lluís; Sara Saldaña; Iris Tió	Spain
bronze medal	Beatrice Andina; Valentina Bisi; Beatrice Esegio; Marta Iacoacci; Alessia Macchi; Sofia Mastroianni; Susanna Pedotti; Giulia Vernice	Italy

The Team technical routine competition at the 2026 European Aquatics Championships was held on 4 August 2026.

== Results ==
The final was started at 16:00.

Rank	Nation	Points
1st place, gold medalist(s)	Neutral Athletes B Kira Cherezova; Valentina Gerasimova; Ekaterina Kossova; Svetlana Pavlova; Elena Shabanova; Aleksandra Shmidt; Elizaveta Smirnova; Olga Tiutiunik	303.2467
2nd place, silver medalist(s)	Spain; Cristina Arámbula; Meritxell Ferré; Marina García; Mireia Hernández; Aurora Lázaro; Lilou Lluís; Sara Saldaña; Iris Tió	296.4299
3rd place, bronze medalist(s)	Italy; Beatrice Andina; Valentina Bisi; Beatrice Esegio; Marta Iacoacci; Alessia Macchi; Sofia Mastroianni; Susanna Pedotti; Giulia Vernice	284.6725
4	France; Laëlys Alavez; Anastasia Bayandina; Angeline Bertinelli; Jeanne Clair; Héloïse Guillot; Claudia Janvier; Romane Lunel; Prune Tapié	276.4857
5	Ukraine; Mariia Hrynishyna; Uliana Hrynishyna; Yelyzaveta Lymar; Daria Moshynska; Daria Prynko; Anastasiia Shmonina; Ameliia Volynska; Mariia Zachepa	272.4366
6	Greece; Thaleia Dampali; Olga Imvrioti; Ismini Karavasili; Stylianos Koukouselis Fouskis; Sofia Malkogeorgou; Vasiliki Thanou; Danai Tsaprali; Georgia Zangana	270.7375
7	Israel; Yogev Dagan; Catherine Kunin; Alexandra Lerman; Noga Levy; Lior Makmel; Liya Makmel; Aya Mazor; Noya Tzarfati	252.9074
8	Great Britain; Anastasia Appleby; Loya Cenkci; Holly Hughes; Pia Lanham; Imogen Sutton; Robyn Swatman; Magdalena Townsend; Eve Young	237.3576
9	Bulgaria; Iren Davidkova; Raya Furnadzhieva; Magdalena Maleva; Taisia Nikolaenko; Valentina Troanska; Maria Valeva; Viktoria Vekova; Lora Zheynova	212.9699
10	Turkey; Ayça Boru; Ece Doğanyıldız; İda Doğrayan; Defne Dündar; Defne Gümüş; Bade Haceryan; Nefise Naz Pınar; Esmanur Yirmibeş	202.9867
