= Artistic swimming at the 2026 European Aquatics Championships – Women's duet free routine =

Women's duet free routine at the 2026 European Aquatics Championships
- Venue: Paris Aquatic Centre
- Dates: 31 July (preliminary); 1 August (final)
- Competitors: 36 from 18 nations
- Teams: 18
- Winning points: 316.3315

Medalists
| gold medal | Anna-Maria Alexandri; Eirini-Marina Alexandri | Greece |
| silver medal | Lilou Lluís; Iris Tió | Spain |
| bronze medal | Mayya Doroshko; Aleksandra Shmidt | Authorised Neutral Athletes |

The Women's duet free routine competition of the 2026 European Aquatics Championships was held on 31 July and 1 August 2026.

== Results ==
The preliminary round was started on 31 July at 09:00. The final was started on 1 August at 16:50.

Green denotes finalists

| Rank | Swimmers | Nationality | Preliminary | | Final | |
| Rank | Swimmers | Nationality | Points | Rank | Points | Rank |
|---|---|---|---|---|---|---|
| 1st place, gold medalist(s) | Anna-Maria Alexandri; Eirini-Marina Alexandri | Greece | 312.7074 | 2 | 316.3315 | 1 |
| 2nd place, silver medalist(s) | Lilou Lluís; Iris Tió | Spain | 316.3850 | 1 | 315.6442 | 2 |
| 3rd place, bronze medalist(s) | Mayya Doroshko; Aleksandra Shmidt | Neutral Athletes B | 308.0287 | 3 | 310.4407 | 3 |
| 4 | Enrica Piccoli; Lucrezia Ruggiero | Italy | 293.3870 | 4 | 295.4962 | 4 |
| 5 | Laëlys Alavez; Romane Lunel | France | 286.9980 | 5 | 289.4847 | 5 |
| 6 | Klara Bleyer; Maria Denisov | Germany | 273.9076 | 6 | 274.7263 | 6 |
| 7 | Mariia Hrynishyna; Uliana Hrynishyna | Ukraine | 244.0395 | 12 | 259.0834 | 7 |
| 8 | Catherine Kunin; Aya Mazor | Israel | 245.0557 | 11 | 248.8000 | 8 |
| 9 | Anastasiya Dabravolskaya; Aliaksandra Mironchyk | Neutral Athletes A | 270.9021 | 7 | 248.2192 | 9 |
| 10 | Robyn Swatman; Eve Young | Great Britain | 245.9813 | 10 | 245.0216 | 10 |
| 11 | Anna-Sophia Aeschbacher; Ixchel Höner | Switzerland | 248.3254 | 9 | 236.8474 | 11 |
| 12 | Maria Alavidze; Nita Natobadze | Georgia | 249.8442 | 8 | 227.4412 | 12 |
| 13 | Mariana Kudynová; Silvia Majerová | Czechia | 236.3687 | 13 | Did not advance | |
| 14 | Anna Carvalho; Inês Dubini | Portugal | 230.4983 | 14 | Did not advance | |
| 15 | Selin Hürmeriç; Ece Üngör | Turkey | 227.6017 | 15 | Did not advance | |
| 16 | Marilyn De Decker; Fien Sandra | Belgium | 214.3313 | 16 | Did not advance | |
| 17 | Raya Furnadzhieva; Lora Zheynova | Bulgaria | 193.8304 | 17 | Did not advance | |
| 18 | Ana Culic; Thea Grima Buttigieg | Malta | 177.1104 | 18 | Did not advance | |
