= Colombia at the 2013 World Aquatics Championships =

- Flag of Colombia
- World Aquatics code: COL
- National federation: Federación Colombiana de Natación
- Website: fecna.com.co

in Barcelona, Spain
- Medals Ranked 19th: Gold 1 Silver 0 Bronze 0 Total 1

World Aquatics Championships appearances
- 1973; 1975; 1978; 1982; 1986; 1991; 1994; 1998; 2001; 2003; 2005; 2007; 2009; 2011; 2013; 2015; 2017; 2019; 2022; 2023; 2024; 2025

Colombia competed at the 2013 World Aquatics Championships in Barcelona, Spain between 19 July and 4 August 2013.

== Medalists ==
Medal	Name	Sport	Event	Date
Gold	Orlando Duque	High diving	Men's high diving	31 July

== Diving ==
Colombia qualified 6 quota places for the following diving events.

Men

Athlete	Event	Preliminaries		Semifinals		Final	
Athlete	Event	Points	Rank	Points	Rank	Points	Rank
Sebastián Morales	1 m springboard	380.45	5 Q	—N/a		387.30	9
Sebastián Morales	3 m springboard	351.40	30	did not advance			
Juan Ríos Lopera	10 m platform	404.35	14 Q	421.05	13	did not advance	
Víctor Ortega; Juan Ríos Lopera	10 m synchronized platform	338.85	12 Q	—N/a		354.30	12

Women

Athlete	Event	Preliminaries		Semifinals		Final	
Athlete	Event	Points	Rank	Points	Rank	Points	Rank
Diana Pineda	1 m springboard	214.35	30	—N/a		did not advance	
Diana Pineda	3 m springboard	236.10	24	did not advance			
Carolina Murillo	3 m springboard	213.40	33	did not advance			
Carolina Murillo	10 m platform	269.95	22	did not advance			

== High diving ==
Colombia qualified one quota places for the following high diving event.

Athlete	Event	Points	Rank
Orlando Duque	Men's high diving	590.20	1st place, gold medalist(s)

== Swimming ==
Colombian swimmers earned qualifying standards in the following events (up to a maximum of 2 swimmers in each event at the A-standard entry time, and 1 at the B-standard):

Men

Athlete	Event	Heat		Semifinal		Final	
Athlete	Event	Time	Rank	Time	Rank	Time	Rank
Mateo de Angulo	200 m freestyle	1:51.14	38	did not advance			
Mateo de Angulo	1500 m freestyle	15:30.59	28	—N/a		did not advance	
Jorge Murillo	50 m breaststroke	28.16	=37	did not advance			
Jorge Murillo	100 m breaststroke	1:01.28	26	did not advance			
Jorge Murillo	200 m breaststroke	2:14.06	25	did not advance			

Women

Athlete	Event	Heat		Semifinal		Final	
Athlete	Event	Time	Rank	Time	Rank	Time	Rank
Monica Álvarez	50 m breaststroke	33.39	=50	did not advance			
Isabella Arcila	100 m freestyle	56.62	36	did not advance			
Jessica Camposano	100 m butterfly	1:00.65	29	did not advance			
Carolina Colorado Henao	50 m freestyle	26.18	35	did not advance			
Carolina Colorado Henao	50 m backstroke	29.08	25	did not advance			
Carolina Colorado Henao	100 m backstroke	1:01.41	18	did not advance			
Carolina Colorado Henao	200 m backstroke	2:14.02	22	did not advance			
Carolina Colorado Henao	50 m butterfly	27.18	29	did not advance			

== Synchronized swimming ==
Colombian synchronized swimmers earned qualifying standards in the following events.

Athlete	Event	Preliminaries		Final	
Athlete	Event	Points	Rank	Points	Rank
Jennifer Cerquera	Solo technical routine	77.100	20	did not advance	
Jennifer Cerquera	Solo free routine	76.370	24	did not advance	
Estefanía Álvarez; Mónica Arango	Duet technical routine	77.700	17	did not advance	
Estefanía Álvarez; Mónica Arango	Duet free routine	77.430	19	did not advance	
