= Anna-Maria Alexandri =

Greek-Austrian synchronized swimmer

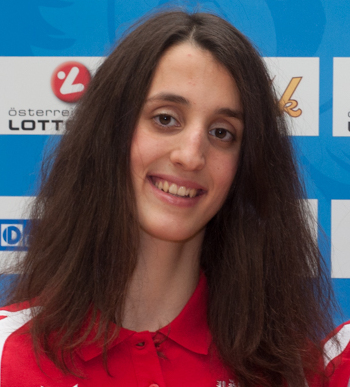
- Alexandri in 2016

Personal information
- Full name: Anna Maria Alexandri (Greek: Άννα Μαρία Αλεξανδρή)
- Nationality: Austrian, Greek
- Born: 15 September 1997 (age 29) Athens, Greece
- Height: 1.72 m (5 ft 8 in)
- Weight: 51 kg (112 lb)

Sport
- Country: Austria (2014-2025); Greece (2012, 2026-present)
- Sport: Artistic swimming
- Club: Olympiacos
Medal record
Women's artistic swimming
Representing Greece
European Championships
Gold medal – first place	2026 Paris	Duet technical routine
Gold medal – first place	2026 Paris	Duet free routine
Representing Austria
World Championships
Gold medal – first place	2023 Fukuoka	Duet free routine
Gold medal – first place	2025 Singapore	Duet technical routine
Bronze medal – third place	2022 Budapest	Duet technical routine
Bronze medal – third place	2022 Budapest	Duet free routine
European Games
Gold medal – first place	2023 Kraków-Małopolska	Duet technical routine
Gold medal – first place	2023 Kraków-Małopolska	Duet free routine
Silver medal – second place	2015 Baku	Duet
Bronze medal – third place	2015 Baku	Solo
European Championships
Gold medal – first place	2025 Funchal	Duet technical routine
Silver medal – second place	2022 Rome	Duet free routine
Silver medal – second place	2022 Rome	Duet technical routine
Bronze medal – third place	2020 Budapest	Duet technical routine

Anna-Maria Alexandri (Greek: Άννα-Μαρία Αλεξανδρή; born 15 September 1997) is a Greek-Austrian artistic swimmer. She competed in the women's duet at the 2016 Summer Olympics, and 2020 Olympics. She competed at the 2024 Paris Olympics in artistic swimming women's duet on 9 and 10 August 2024.

She has two more sisters and they are triplets, Eirini-Marina and Vasiliki Alexandri. The three sisters grew up in Volos, and moved in Austria in 2012, after an argument with Hellenic Aquatics Federation. She competed at the 2024 Paris Olympics in artistic swimming women's duet on 9 and 10 August 2024.

On 27 February 2026, the Hellenic Olympic Committee announced Anna-Maria's and her sisters return to Greece representing their birth country again starting from the 2026 European Aquatics Championships in Paris, France.

== Career ==
Anna Maria was a member of the Greek National Team from 2010. She won gold medals in two Comen Cups on 2010, 2011 (age group 13–15) and she competed at the European Championships (senior category) on 2012 in Eindhoven at the age of 15 years old. In 2012 she moved to Austria, and in 2014 she acquired the Austrian nationality and represents Austria in synchronised swimming since then. She took part in the Junior World Championships in Helsinki in 2014, where she qualified for the finals and placed 7th in Solo and 9th in Duet with her sister. In 2015, she competed at the 1st European Games in Baku, where she won the silver medal in women's duet and the bronze medal in women's solo. With those two medals, Austria was placed 3rd in the medal table. Later that year, Anna Maria competed with her sisters in the senior category at the World Championships, where she qualified to the Finals in the women's technical duet.

In 2016, she competed at the European Championships in London, where she finished in 5th place.

She competed for Austria at the 2024 Summer Olympics in artistic swimming women's duet on August 9 and 10, 2024.
