= Mayya Doroshko =

Russian synchronised swimmer (born 1999)

Personal information
- Nationality: Russian
- Born: 23 April 1999 (age 27)

Sport
- Country: Russia
- Sport: Synchronised swimming
Medal record
Representing Neutral Athletes B
World Championships
Bronze medal – third place	2025 Singapore	Duet technical routine
Bronze medal – third place	2025 Singapore	Duet free routine
European Championships
Gold medal – first place	2026 Paris	Team free routine
Gold medal – first place	2026 Paris	Team acrobatic routine
Silver medal – second place	2026 Paris	Duet technical routine
Bronze medal – third place	2026 Paris	Duet free routine
Representing Russia
World Championships
Gold medal – first place	2019 Gwangju	Team technical routine
Gold medal – first place	2019 Gwangju	Free routine combination

Mayya Alexandrovna Doroshko (Russian: Майя Александровна Дорошко; born 23 April 1999) is a Russian synchronised swimmer.

She participated at the 2019 World Aquatics Championships, winning a medal.

As a result of the Russian invasion of Ukraine, Doroshko was unable to compete in the 2024 Summer Olympics as Russia was banned from all team events.
