= Eirini-Marina Alexandri =

Greek-Austrian synchronized swimmer

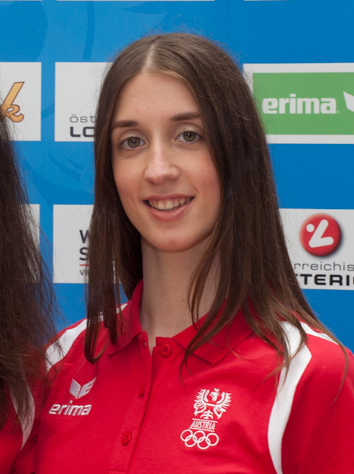
- Alexandri in 2016

Personal information
- Nationality: Austrian-Greek
- Born: 15 September 1997 (age 29) Athens, Greece
- Height: 1.73 m (5 ft 8 in)
- Weight: 53 kg (117 lb)

Sport
- Country: Austria (2014 until 2025); Greece (2012, 2026-present)
- Sport: Artistic swimming
- Club: Olympiacos
Medal record
Women's artistic swimming
Representing Greece
European Championships
Gold medal – first place	2026 Paris	Duet technical routine
Gold medal – first place	2026 Paris	Duet free routine
Representing Austria
World Championships
Gold medal – first place	2023 Fukuoka	Duet free routine
Gold medal – first place	2025 Singapore	Duet technical routine
Bronze medal – third place	2022 Budapest	Duet technical routine
Bronze medal – third place	2022 Budapest	Duet free routine
European Games
Gold medal – first place	2023 Kraków-Małopolska	Duet technical routine
Gold medal – first place	2023 Kraków-Małopolska	Duet free routine
Silver medal – second place	2015 Baku	Duet
European Championships
Gold medal – first place	2025 Funchal	Duet technical routine
Silver medal – second place	2022 Rome	Duet free routine
Silver medal – second place	2022 Rome	Duet technical routine
Bronze medal – third place	2020 Budapest	Duet technical routine

Eirini-Marina Alexandri (Greek: Ειρήνη-Μαρίνα Αλεξανδρή; born 15 September 1997) is a Greek-Austrian artistic swimmer. She competed in the women's duet at the 2016 Summer Olympics, and 2020 Olympics. She is a triplet and teams with her sisters, Anna-Maria and Vasiliki Alexandri. The three sisters grew up in Volos, and moved in Austria in 2012, after an argument with Hellenic Aquatics Federation. She competed at the 2024 Paris Olympics in artistic swimming women's duet on 9 and 10 August 2024.

On 27 February 2026, the Hellenic Olympic Committee announced Eirini-Marina's and her sisters return to Greece representing their birth country again starting from the 2026 European Aquatics Championships in Paris, France.
