= Sara Saldaña =

Spanish synchronized swimmer (born 2000)

Personal information
- Full name: Sara Saldaña López
- Nationality: Spanish
- Born: 25 July 2000 (age 26) Leganés, Spain
- Height: 1.71 m (5 ft 7 in)
- Weight: 54 kg (119 lb)

Sport
- Country: Spain
- Sport: Synchronised swimming
Medal record
World Championships
Gold medal – first place	2023 Fukuoka	Team technical routine
Silver medal – second place	2024 Doha	Team technical routine
Bronze medal – third place	2025 Singapore	Team free routine
Bronze medal – third place	2025 Singapore	Team technical routine
Bronze medal – third place	2025 Singapore	Team acrobatic routine
European Championships
Silver medal – second place	2026 Paris	Team free routine
Silver medal – second place	2026 Paris	Team technical routine
Silver medal – second place	2026 Paris	Team acrobatic routine
Bronze medal – third place	2018 Glasgow	Free routine combination
Bronze medal – third place	2020 Budapest	Team technical routine
European Games
Gold medal – first place	2023 Kraków–Małopolska	Team technical routine
Gold medal – first place	2023 Kraków–Małopolska	Team free routine
Silver medal – second place	2015 Baku	Team
Silver medal – second place	2015 Baku	Free routine combination

Sara Saldaña López (born 25 July 2000) is a Spanish synchronised swimmer.

She won a bronze medal in the free routine combination competition at the 2018 European Aquatics Championships.
