= Paula Ramírez =

Spanish synchronized swimmer (born 1996)

Personal information
- Full name: Paula Ramírez Ibáñez
- Nationality: Spanish
- Born: 23 April 1996 (age 30) Barcelona, Spain
- Height: 1.75 m (5 ft 9 in)
- Weight: 57 kg (126 lb)

Sport
- Country: Spain
- Sport: Synchronised swimming
Medal record
Women's artistic swimming
Representing Spain
| Event | 1st | 2nd | 3rd |
|---|---|---|---|
| Olympic Games | 0 | 0 | 1 |
| World Championships | 1 | 2 | 5 |
| European Championships | 0 | 1 | 3 |
| European Games | 2 | 0 | 0 |
| Total | 3 | 3 | 9 |
Olympic Games
| Bronze medal – third place | 2024 Paris | Team |
World Championships
| Gold medal – first place | 2023 Fukuoka | Team technical routine |
| Silver medal – second place | 2024 Doha | Team technical routine |
| Bronze medal – third place | 2019 Gwangju | Highlight routine |
| Bronze medal – third place | 2022 Budapest | Highlight routine |
| Bronze medal – third place | 2025 Singapore | Team free routine |
| Bronze medal – third place | 2025 Singapore | Team technical routine |
| Bronze medal – third place | 2025 Singapore | Team acrobatic routine |
European Games
| Gold medal – first place | 2023 Kraków-Małopolska | Team free routine |
| Gold medal – first place | 2023 Kraków-Małopolska | Team technical routine |
European Championships
| Silver medal – second place | 2026 Paris | Team acrobatic routine |
| Bronze medal – third place | 2018 Glasgow | Free routine combination |
| Bronze medal – third place | 2016 London | Team free routine |
| Bronze medal – third place | 2020 Budapest | Team technical routine |

Paula Ramírez Ibáñez (born 23 April 1996) is a Spanish synchronised swimmer.

She won a bronze medal in the free routine combination competition at the 2018 European Aquatics Championships.
