= Marina García Polo =

Spanish synchronised swimmer (born 2004)

Marina García
Personal information
- Full name: Marina García Polo
- National team: Spain
- Born: 5 December 2004 (age 21)
- Home town: Sant Cugat del Vallès, Spain

Sport
- Sport: Swimming
- Strokes: Synchronised swimming
Medal record
Women's synchronised swimming
Representing Spain
Olympic Games
Bronze medal – third place	2024 Paris	Team
World Championships
Bronze medal – third place	2025 Singapore	Team free routine
Bronze medal – third place	2025 Singapore	Team technical routine
Bronze medal – third place	2025 Singapore	Team acrobatic routine
European Championships
Silver medal – second place	2026 Paris	Team free routine
Silver medal – second place	2026 Paris	Team technical routine
Silver medal – second place	2026 Paris	Team acrobatic routine

Marina García Polo (born 5 December 2004) is a Spanish synchronised swimmer.

== Career ==
She was part of the Spanish team that won the bronze medal at the 2024 Summer Olympics in Paris.
