= Alisa Ozhogina =

Spanish synchronized swimmer (born 2000)

Personal information
- Full name: Alisa Ozhogina Ozhogin
- National team: Spain
- Born: 31 October 2000 (age 25) Moscow, Russia
- Height: 1.73 m (5 ft 8 in)
- Weight: 59 kg (130 lb)

Sport
- Sport: Swimming
- Strokes: Synchronised swimming
Medal record
Women's artistic swimming
Representing Spain
Event	1st	2nd	3rd
Olympic Games	0	0	1
World Championships	1	1	5
European Championships	1	1	1
European Games	2	0	0
Total	4	2	7
Olympic Games
Bronze medal – third place	2024 Paris	Team
World Championships
Gold medal – first place	2023 Fukuoka	Team technical routine
Silver medal – second place	2024 Doha	Team technical routine
Bronze medal – third place	2022 Budapest	Highlight routine
Bronze medal – third place	2023 Fukuoka	Duet technical routine
Bronze medal – third place	2024 Doha	Duet technical routine
Bronze medal – third place	2025 Singapore	Team free routine
Bronze medal – third place	2025 Singapore	Team technical routine
European Games
Gold medal – first place	2023 Kraków-Małopolska	Team free routine
Gold medal – first place	2023 Kraków-Małopolska	Team technical routine
European Championships
Gold medal – first place	2024 Belgrade	Team technical routine
Silver medal – second place	2020 Budapest	Team free routine
Silver medal – second place	2026 Paris	Team free routine
Bronze medal – third place	2020 Budapest	Team technical routine

Alisa Ozhogina Ozhogin (born 31 October 2000) is a synchro (artistic) swimmer. Born in Russia, she represents Spain internationally. She is a two-time 2020 European medalist in team events.

She was born in Moscow, Russia, but grew up in the Spanish city of Seville.

She represented Spain at the 2021 Olympic Games in Tokyo. She became bronze medallist at the Paris 2024 Olympic Games.
