= Zoi Karangelou =

Greek synchronized swimmer (born 2005)

Personal information
- Nationality: Greek
- Born: 11 March 2005 (age 21) Volos, Greece
- Height: 1.63 m (5 ft 4 in)

Sport
- Sport: Swimming
- Strokes: Artistic Swimming
Medal record
European Championships
| Gold medal – first place | 2024 Belgrade | Team free routine |
| Silver medal – second place | 2020 Budapest | Free combination routine |
| Silver medal – second place | 2024 Belgrade | Team acrobatic routine |
| Silver medal – second place | 2024 Belgrade | Team technical routine |
| Bronze medal – third place | 2022 Rome | Free combination routine |
World Junior Championships
| Gold medal – first place | 2024 Lima | Solo free routine |
| Bronze medal – third place | 2022 Quebec City | Highlight routine |
European Junior Championships
| Silver medal – second place | 2023 Funchal | Solo free routine |
| Silver medal – second place | 2024 Cottonera | Team acrobatic routine |
| Silver medal – second place | 2024 Cottonera | Team technical routine |
| Bronze medal – third place | 2022 Alicante | Free combination routine |
| Bronze medal – third place | 2022 Alicante | Highlight routine |
| Bronze medal – third place | 2024 Cottonera | Solo free routine |
| Bronze medal – third place | 2024 Cottonera | Team free routine |

Zoi Karangelou (Greek: Ζωή Καράγγελου; born 11 March 2005) is a Greek artistic swimmer.

In August 2024, she won the gold medal in solo free routine at the 2024 World Artistic Swimming Junior Championships in Lima, Peru.

== Career ==
In junior level, she has won 7 medals (3 silver and 4 bronze) in the European Championships while in the World Championships she has won 2 medals (1 gold and 1 bronze). The gold medal that she claimed in solo free routine at the 2024 World Championships in Lima, Peru was the first-ever for Greece in World Championships competition at junior category and the third-ever at all categories (Youth, Junior or Senior).

At the 2020 European Championships which were held in 2021 due to COVID-19 pandemic in Budapest, Hungary she was part of the team that won the silver medal in free combination routine.

In 2022 FINA Artistic Swimming World Series final which was held in Athens, Greece she won 2 medals (1 gold and 1 silver) in free combination routine and highlight routine.

At the 2022 European Championships which were held in Rome, Italy she was part of the team that won the bronze medal in free combination routine.

At the 2024 European Championships which were held in Belgrade, Serbia she claimed 3 medals (1 gold and 2 silver) in all team events (technical routine, free routine, acrobatic routine). The gold medal in team free routine was the first-ever for Greece at the European Championships.
