= Artistic swimming at the 2025 World Aquatics Championships =

- Host city: Singapore
- Date: 18–25 July
- Venue: World Aquatics Championships Arena
- Events: 11

The artistic swimming events at the 2025 World Aquatics Championships was held from 18 to 25 July 2025 at the World Aquatics Championships Arena in Singapore.

== Schedule ==
11 events were held.

All times are local (UTC+8).

Date	Time	Event
18 July 2025	10:00	Women solo technical
18 July 2025	14:00	Women duet technical
19 July 2025	10:00	Team free
19 July 2025	14:00	Men solo technical
19 July 2025	18:30	Women solo technical
20 July 2025	10:00	Women solo free
20 July 2025	20:00	Team free
21 July 2025	10:00	Team technical
21 July 2025	14:00	Men solo free
21 July 2025	18:30	Women duet technical
22 July 2025	10:00	Women solo free
22 July 2025	18:30	Team technical
23 July 2025	10:00	Women duet free
23 July 2025	19:30	Mixed duet technical
24 July 2025	10:00	Team acrobatic
24 July 2025	19:30	Women duet free
25 July 2025	10:00	Mixed duet free
25 July 2025	19:30	Team acrobatic

== Medal summary ==
=== Medal table ===
* Host nation (Singapore)

Rank	Nation	Gold	Silver	Bronze	Total
1	China	4	3	0	7
2	Neutral Athletes B (Note: In accordance with sanctions imposed following by the 2022 Russian invasion of Ukraine, athletes from Russia were not permitted to use the name, flag, or anthem of Russia. They instead participated as "Neutral Athlete B (NAB)" and under the World Aquatics flag.)	3	3	2	8
3	Spain	3	2	4	9
4	Austria	1	0	0	1
5	Italy	0	1	2	3
6	Neutral Athletes A (Note: In accordance with sanctions imposed following by the 2022 Russian invasion of Ukraine, athletes from Belarus were not permitted to use the name, flag, or anthem of Belarus. They instead participated as "Neutral Athlete A (NAA)" and under the World Aquatics flag.)	0	1	1	2
7	Japan	0	1	0	1
8	Great Britain	0	0	1	1
8	Mexico	0	0	1	1
Totals (9 entries)		11	11	11	33

=== Men ===
Event	Gold		Silver		Bronze	
Solo free routine	Aleksandr Maltsev; Neutral Athletes B	229.5613	Guo Muye; China	220.1926	Filippo Pelati; Italy	213.9850
Solo technical routine	Aleksandr Maltsev; Neutral Athletes B	251.7133	Dennis González; Spain	241.1667	Diego Villalobos; Mexico	238.1600

=== Women ===
Event	Gold		Silver		Bronze	
Solo free routine	Iris Tió; Spain	245.1913	Xu Huiyan; China	241.0025	Vasilina Khandoshka; Neutral Athletes A	239.5437
Solo technical routine	Xu Huiyan; China	272.9917	Vasilina Khandoshka; Neutral Athletes A	260.5416	Iris Tió; Spain	260.2917
Duet free routine	Spain; Lilou Lluís; Iris Tió	282.6087	Italy; Enrica Piccoli; Lucrezia Ruggiero	278.7137	Neutral Athletes B Mayya Doroshko; Tatiana Gayday	277.1117
Duet technical routine	Austria; Anna-Maria Alexandri; Eirini-Marina Alexandri	307.1451	China; Lin Yanhan; Lin Yanjun	301.4057	Neutral Athletes B Mayya Doroshko; Tatiana Gayday	300.2183

=== Mixed ===
Event	Gold		Silver		Bronze	
Duet free routine	Spain; Dennis González; Iris Tió	323.8563	Neutral Athletes B Aleksandr Maltsev; Olesia Platonova	323.4438	Great Britain; Ranjuo Tomblin; Isabelle Thorpe	322.0583
Duet technical routine	Neutral Athletes B Aleksandr Maltsev; Mayya Gurbanberdieva	233.2100	Spain; Dennis González; Mireia Hernández	230.4634	Italy; Filippo Pelati; Lucrezia Ruggiero	228.0275

=== Team ===
Event	Gold		Silver		Bronze	
Acrobatic routine	China; Chang Hao; Cheng Wentao; Feng Yu; Lin Yanhan; Lin Yanjun; Xiang Binxuan; Xu Huiyan; Zhang Yayi	229.0186	Neutral Athletes B Anna Andrianova; Anastasiia Bakhtyreva; Daria Geloshvili; Ekaterina Kossova; Elizaveta Minaeva; Evelina Simonova; Elizaveta Smirnova; Agniia Tulupova	224.7291	Spain; Cristina Arambula; Meritxell Ferré; Marina García Polo; Dennis González Boneu; Lilou Lluís; Meritxell Mas; Paula Ramírez; Sara Saldaña	221.0962
Free routine	China; Chang Hao; Cheng Wentao; Dai Shiyi; Feng Yu; Li Xiuchen; Lin Yanhan; Xiang Binxuan; Xu Huiyan	348.4779	Japan; Kaho Aitaka; Moka Fujii; Moe Higa; Yuka Kawase; Uta Kobayashi; Tomoka Sato; Nao Shirahase; Sakurako Uchida	334.7232	Spain; Cristina Arambula; Meritxell Ferré; Marina García Polo; Dennis González Boneu; Alisa Ozhogina; Paula Ramírez; Sara Saldaña; Iris Tió	321.1328
Technical routine	China; Chang Hao; Cheng Wentao; Dai Shiyi; Feng Yu; Li Xiuchen; Lin Yanjun; Xiang Binxuan; Xu Huiyan	307.8001	Neutral Athletes B Anna Andrianova; Anastasiia Bakhtyreva; Daria Geloshvili; Ekaterina Kossova; Elizaveta Minaeva; Evelina Simonova; Elizaveta Smirnova; Agniia Tulupova	300.6183	Spain; Cristina Arambula; Meritxell Ferré; Marina García; Lilou Lluís; Alisa Ozhogina; Paula Ramírez; Sara Saldaña; Iris Tió; Mireia Hernández	294.8575
