= Meritxell Ferré =

Spanish synchronised swimmer (born 2006)

Personal information
- Full name: Meritxell Ferré Gaset
- Nickname: Txell
- National team: Spain
- Born: 10 November 2006 (age 19)

Sport
- Sport: Swimming
- Strokes: Synchronised swimming
Medal record
Women's synchronised swimming
Representing Spain
Olympic Games
Bronze medal – third place	2024 Paris	Team
World Championships
Bronze medal – third place	2025 Singapore	Team free routine
Bronze medal – third place	2025 Singapore	Team technical routine
Bronze medal – third place	2025 Singapore	Team acrobatic routine
European Championships
Silver medal – second place	2026 Paris	Team free routine
Silver medal – second place	2026 Paris	Team technical routine
Silver medal – second place	2026 Paris	Team acrobatic routine

Meritxell "Txell" Ferré Gaset (born 10 November 2006) is a Spanish synchronised swimmer.

== Career ==
She was part of the Spanish team that won the bronze medal at the 2024 Summer Olympics in Paris.
