= Lilou Lluís =

Spanish synchronized swimmer (born 2006)

Personal information
- Full name: Lilou Lluís Valette
- Born: 28 July 2006 (age 20)

Sport
- Country: Spain
- Sport: Synchronized swimming
Medal record
Women's synchronized swimming
Representing Spain
Olympic Games
Bronze medal – third place	2024 Paris	Team
World Championships
Gold medal – first place	2025 Singapore	Duet free routine
Bronze medal – third place	2025 Singapore	Team technical routine
Bronze medal – third place	2025 Singapore	Team acrobatic routine
European Championships
Gold medal – first place	2025 Funchal	Team technical routine
Silver medal – second place	2025 Funchal	Duet free routine
Silver medal – second place	2025 Funchal	Duet technical routine
Silver medal – second place	2026 Paris	Duet free routine
Silver medal – second place	2026 Paris	Team free routine
Silver medal – second place	2026 Paris	Team technical routine
Silver medal – second place	2026 Paris	Team acrobatic routine
Bronze medal – third place	2025 Funchal	Acrobatic routine

Lilou Lluís Valette (born 28 July 2006) is a Spanish synchronized swimmer. She competed at the 2024 Summer Olympics and won a bronze medal in the team event.

== Career ==
Lluís was born on 28 July 2006. She grew up in Perpignan, France, and later Madrid, Spain, where she competed at a young age in synchronized swimming for the club CNS Fabio Nelli. She later was a member of AD Sincro Retiro. She won an individual silver medal in her age group at the 2021 Spanish Winter Championships and later that year was called up to the youth national team, competing at the European Championships and the Mediterranean Cup.

Lluís represented Spain at the 2022 FINA World Junior Artistic Swimming Championships, where she won two gold medals and three silver. In 2023, at age 16, she competed at the World Aquatics Artistic Swimming World Cup, winning two silver medals including in the solo free event. She also won two gold medals – in the free duo and solo events – at the 2023 Spanish national championships.

As of 2024, Lluís was a high school student. She was one of four Madrid natives selected to compete at the 2024 World Aquatics Championships, where she participated in two events. At the World Aquatics Championships, she helped Spain win the silver medal in the team technical event. She also helped Spain win a gold medal at the 2024 European championships. She was chosen to compete for the Spanish team at the 2024 Summer Olympics, being the youngest member of the team at 17 years old (she turned 18 during the games). At the Olympics, she was part of the Spanish team that won the bronze medal.
