= Iris Tió =

Spanish synchronised swimmer (born 2002)

Personal information
- Full name: Iris Tió Casas
- Nationality: Spanish
- Born: 2 November 2002 (age 23) Barcelona, Spain
- Height: 1.76 m (5 ft 9 in)
- Weight: 61 kg (134 lb)

Sport
- Country: Spain
- Sport: Synchronised swimming
Medal record
Olympic Games
Bronze medal – third place	2024 Paris	Team
World Championships
Gold medal – first place	2023 Fukuoka	Team technical routine
Gold medal – first place	2025 Singapore	Solo free routine
Gold medal – first place	2025 Singapore	Duet free routine
Gold medal – first place	2025 Singapore	Mixed duet free routine
Silver medal – second place	2024 Doha	Team technical routine
Bronze medal – third place	2022 Budapest	Highlight routine
Bronze medal – third place	2023 Fukuoka	Solo technical routine
Bronze medal – third place	2023 Fukuoka	Duet technical routine
Bronze medal – third place	2024 Doha	Duet technical routine
Bronze medal – third place	2025 Singapore	Solo technical routine
Bronze medal – third place	2025 Singapore	Team technical routine
Bronze medal – third place	2025 Singapore	Team free routine
European Games
Gold medal – first place	2023 Kraków–Małopolska	Team technical routine
Gold medal – first place	2023 Kraków–Małopolska	Team free routine
European Championships
Gold medal – first place	2024 Belgrade	Team technical routine
Gold medal – first place	2025 Funchal	Mixed duet free routine
Gold medal – first place	2025 Funchal	Team free routine
Gold medal – first place	2025 Funchal	Team technical routine
Gold medal – first place	2026 Paris	Solo technical routine
Silver medal – second place	2025 Funchal	Solo technical routine
Silver medal – second place	2025 Funchal	Duet free routine
Silver medal – second place	2026 Paris	Duet free routine
Silver medal – second place	2026 Paris	Mixed duet free
Silver medal – second place	2026 Paris	Team technical routine
Silver medal – second place	2026 Paris	Team acrobatic routine
Bronze medal – third place	2018 Glasgow	Free routine combination
Bronze medal – third place	2020 Budapest	Team technical routine
Bronze medal – third place	2025 Funchal	Solo free routine
Bronze medal – third place	2026 Paris	Solo free routine

Iris Tió Casas (born 2 November 2002) is a Spanish synchronised swimmer.

== Career ==
She won a bronze medal in the free routine combination competition at the 2018 European Aquatics Championships. During the 2025 World Aquatics Championships in Singapore she won two bronze medals – in solo technical routine and team free routine events – and three gold medals – solo free routine, duet free routine and mixed duet free routine –, becoming the first Spaniard to win each one of the three medals, and the only Spaniard with more than one gold medal in the world championships.
