= Artistic swimming at the 2019 World Aquatics Championships – Mixed duet free routine =

Mixed duet free routine at the 2019 World Aquatics Championships
- Venue: Yeomju Gymnasium
- Location: Gwangju, South Korea
- Dates: 19–20 July
- Competitors: 22 from 11 nations
- Teams: 11
- Winning points: 92.9667

Medalists
| gold medal | Mayya Gurbanberdieva; Aleksandr Maltsev | Russia |
| silver medal | Manila Flamini; Giorgio Minisini | Italy |
| bronze medal | Yumi Adachi; Atsushi Abe | Japan |

The Mixed duet free routine competition at the 2019 World Aquatics Championships was held on 19 and 20 July 2019.

== Results ==
The preliminary round was started on 19 July at 11:00. The final was started on 20 July at 17:00.

Green denotes finalists

| Rank | Nation | Swimmers | Preliminary | | Final | |
| Rank | Nation | Swimmers | Points | Rank | Points | Rank |
|---|---|---|---|---|---|---|
| 1st place, gold medalist(s) | Russia | Mayya Gurbanberdieva; Aleksandr Maltsev | 93.1000 | 1 | 92.9667 | 1 |
| 2nd place, silver medalist(s) | Italy | Manila Flamini; Giorgio Minisini | 91.6000 | 2 | 91.8333 | 2 |
| 3rd place, bronze medalist(s) | Japan | Yumi Adachi; Atsushi Abe | 89.8000 | 3 | 90.4000 | 3 |
| 4 | United States | Natalia Vega; Bill May | 87.8667 | 4 | 88.3000 | 4 |
| 5 | Spain | Emma García; Pau Ribes | 86.1333 | 5 | 86.3667 | 5 |
| 6 | China | Cheng Wentao; Shi Haoyu | 85.7000 | 6 | 85.6667 | 6 |
| 7 | Brazil | Giovana Stephan; Renan Souza | 81.2333 | 7 | 81.2333 | 7 |
| 8 | Colombia | Jennifer Cerquera; Gustavo Sánchez | 78.5667 | 8 | 78.7000 | 8 |
| 9 | Uzbekistan | Dinara Ibragimova; Vyacheslav Rudnev | 74.2333 | 9 | 74.4333 | 9 |
| 10 | Turkey | Gökçe Akgün; Rümeysa Ünal | 70.2000 | 10 | 70.9000 | 10 |
| 11 | Australia | Danielle Kettlewell; Ethan Calleja | 68.9667 | 11 | 68.7000 | 11 |
