= Artistic swimming at the 2020 European Aquatics Championships – Mixed free routine =

Mixed free routine at the 2020 European Aquatics Championships
- Venue: Danube Arena
- Dates: 14 May 2021
- Competitors: 8 from 4 nations
- Teams: 4
- Winning points: 93.9333

Medalists
gold medal	Olesia Platonova; Aleksandr Maltsev	Russia
silver medal	Emma García; Pau Ribes	Spain
bronze medal	Isotta Sportelli; Nicolò Ogliari	Italy

The Mixed free routine competition of the 2020 European Aquatics Championships was held on 14 May 2021.

== Results ==
The final was held at 10:10.

Rank	Nation	Swimers	Points			
Rank	Nation	Swimers	Execution	Impression	Elements	Total
1st place, gold medalist(s)	Russia	Olesia Platonova; Aleksandr Maltsev	28,3000	37,7333	27,9000	93,9333
2nd place, silver medalist(s)	Spain	Emma García; Pau Ribes	25,1000	35,3333	26,1000	86,5333
3rd place, bronze medalist(s)	Italy	Isotta Sportelli; Nicolò Ogliari	24,3000	33.4667	24,100	81,8667
4	Slovakia	Silvia Solymosyová; Jozef Solymosy	22,2000	31,4667	22,5000	76,1667
