= World Aquatics Artistic Swimming Junior Championships =

International sporting event

The World Aquatics Junior Artistic Swimming Championships is an international, synchronized swimming event organized by World Aquatics held every 2 years. It was first held in 1989, and 2012 saw its thirteenth edition.

The event features competition in five artistic swimming event categories (Solo, Duet, Team, Free Combination, Highlight). Free Combination was added to the program beginning in 2002 and Highlight was added to the program starting in the 2022 edition.

For the editions of the Championships between 1989 and 2016, inclusive, the name of the Championships at the time of competition was FINA World Junior Artistic Swimming Championships, but following a name change of the sport from synchronised swimming to artistic swimming in 2017, which corresponded with a change in performance evaluation criteria, the name of the Championships at the time of competition was changed to FINA World Junior Artistic Swimming Championships for all subsequent editions (2018 and 2022).

== Editions ==
Edition	Year	Events	Location	Dates	Nations
1	1989	S, D, T	Cali, Colombia	17–23 July	
2	1991	S, D, T	Salerno, Italy	25–28 July	
3	1993	S, D, T	Leeds, United Kingdom	27–30 August	
4	1995	S, D, T	Bonn, Germany	20–23 July	28
5	1997	S, D, T	Moscow, Russia	29 June – 3 July	27
6	1999	S, D, T	Cali, Colombia	7–11 July	15
7	2001	S, D, T	Federal Way, United States	15–19 August	28
8	2002	S, D, T, FC	Montreal, Canada	15–18 August	29
9	2004	S, D, T, FC	Moscow, Russia	21–25 July	31
10	2006	S, D, T, FC	Foshan, China	7–11 October	
11	2008	S, D, T, FC	St. Petersburg, Russia	8–13 July	26
12	2010	S, D, T, FC	Indianapolis, United States	9–15 August	25
13	2012	S, D, T, FC	Volos, Greece	12–16 September	33
14	2014	S, D, T, FC	Helsinki, Finland	30 July – 3 August	34
15	2016	Fig, S, D, T, FC	Kazan, Russia	9–13 July	34
16	2018	TS, FS, TD, FD, MDT, MDF, TT, FT, FC	Budapest, Hungary	18–22 July	41
17	2022	TS, FS, TD, FD, MDT, MDF, MH, TT, FT, FC, MTS, MFS	Quebec City, Canada	23–27 August	25
18	2024	TS, FS, TD, FD, MDT, MDF, A, TT, FT, MTS, MFS	Lima, Peru	28 August – 1 September	35
19	2026	TS, FS, TD, FD, MDT, MDF, A, TT, FT, MTS, MFS	Budapest, Hungary	12–16 August	

Event codes: Fig= Solo Figures, S= Solo, TS= Technical Solo, FS= Free Solo, D= Duet, TD=Technical Duet, FD= Free Duet, T= Team, TT= Technical Team, FT= Free Team, FC= Free Combination, MDT= Mixed Duet Technical, MDF= Mixed Duet Free, MH= Mixed Highlight, A= Acrobatic, MTS= Man Technical Solo, MFS= Man Free Solo

== Medal table ==
Updated after 2026 Championships.

Rank	Nation	Gold	Silver	Bronze	Total
1	Russia (RUS)	60	4	3	67
2	Japan (JPN)	14	23	24	61
3	Spain (ESP)	6	12	16	34
4	China (CHN)	5	18	16	39
5	United States (USA)	3	1	4	8
6	Canada (CAN)	2	11	9	22
7	Ukraine (UKR)	1	15	3	19
8	South Korea (KOR)	1	1	0	2
9	Greece (GRE)	1	0	2	3
10	Italy (ITA)	0	2	10	12
11	Kazakhstan (KAZ)	0	2	5	7
12	France (FRA)	0	2	2	4
13	Soviet Union (URS)	0	1	1	2
14	Great Britain (GBR)	0	1	0	1
15	Belarus (BLR)	0	0	1	1
Totals (15 entries)		93	93	96	282

== See also ==
- FINA World Junior Swimming Championships
- FINA World Junior Diving Championships
- FINA Junior Water Polo World Championships
- FINA World Junior Open Water Swimming Championships
