= Filippo Pelati =

Italian artistic swimmer (born 2007)

Personal information
- Nationality: Italian
- Born: 22 March 2007 (age 19) Lagosanto, Italy

Sport
- Country: Italy
- Sport: Synchronised swimming
Medal record
Men's artistic swimming
Representing Italy
World Championships
Bronze medal – third place	2025 Singapore	Solo free
Bronze medal – third place	2025 Singapore	Mixed duet technical
European Championships
Silver medal – second place	2024 Belgrade	Mixed duet free
Silver medal – second place	2024 Belgrade	Mixed duet technical
Silver medal – second place	2025 Funchal	Solo free
Silver medal – second place	2025 Funchal	Solo technical
Silver medal – second place	2025 Funchal	Mixed duet free
Silver medal – second place	2026 Paris	Solo free
Silver medal – second place	2026 Paris	Solo technical
Silver medal – second place	2026 Paris	Mixed duet technical
Bronze medal – third place	2025 Funchal	Mixed duet technical
Bronze medal – third place	2026 Paris	Mixed duet free
World Junior Championships
Bronze medal – third place	2022 Quebec City	Duet technical
Bronze medal – third place	2024 Lima	Duet technical

Filippo Pelati (born 22 March 2007) is an Italian synchronised swimmer.

== Early life ==
Pelati was born in Lagosanto. He discovered artistic swimming at eight years old, and moved to Bologna in 2021 to train under Beatrice Casalini and Patrizia Giallombardo, the technical director of the Italian national team.

== Career ==
Pelati made his World Aquatics Championships debut in 2025. He won bronze medals in the solo free routine and the mixed duet technical routine, along with his partner Lucrezia Ruggiero.

In August 2026, he competed at the 2026 European Aquatics Championships and won silver medals in the solo free and solo technical routines. He also won a silver medal in the mixed duet technical routine, and a bronze medal in the mixed duet free, along with Ruggiero.
