= Artistic swimming at the 2020 European Aquatics Championships – Mixed technical routine =

Mixed technical routine at the 2020 European Aquatics Championships
- Venue: Danube Arena
- Dates: 10 May 2021
- Competitors: 8 from 4 nations
- Teams: 4
- Winning points: 91.7963

Medalists
gold medal	Mayya Gurbanberdieva; Aleksandr Maltsev	Russia
silver medal	Emma García; Pau Ribes	Spain
bronze medal	Isotta Sportelli; Nicolò Ogliari	Italy

The Mixed technical routine competition of the 2020 European Aquatics Championships was held on 10 May 2021.

== Results ==
The final was held at 17:30.

Rank	Nation	Swimers	Points			
Rank	Nation	Swimers	Execution	Impression	Elements	Total
1st place, gold medalist(s)	Russia	Mayya Gurbanberdieva; Aleksandr Maltsev	28.0000	27.4000	36.3963	91.7963
2nd place, silver medalist(s)	Spain	Emma García; Pau Ribes	25.8000	25.9000	33.1694	84.8694
3rd place, bronze medalist(s)	Italy	Isotta Sportelli; Nicolò Ogliari	23.6000	23.4000	30.4281	77.4281
4	Slovakia	Silvia Solymosyová; Jozef Solymosy	22.2000	22.8000	28.3682	73.3682
