= Aleksandr Maltsev (synchronised swimmer) =

Russian swimmer (born 1995)

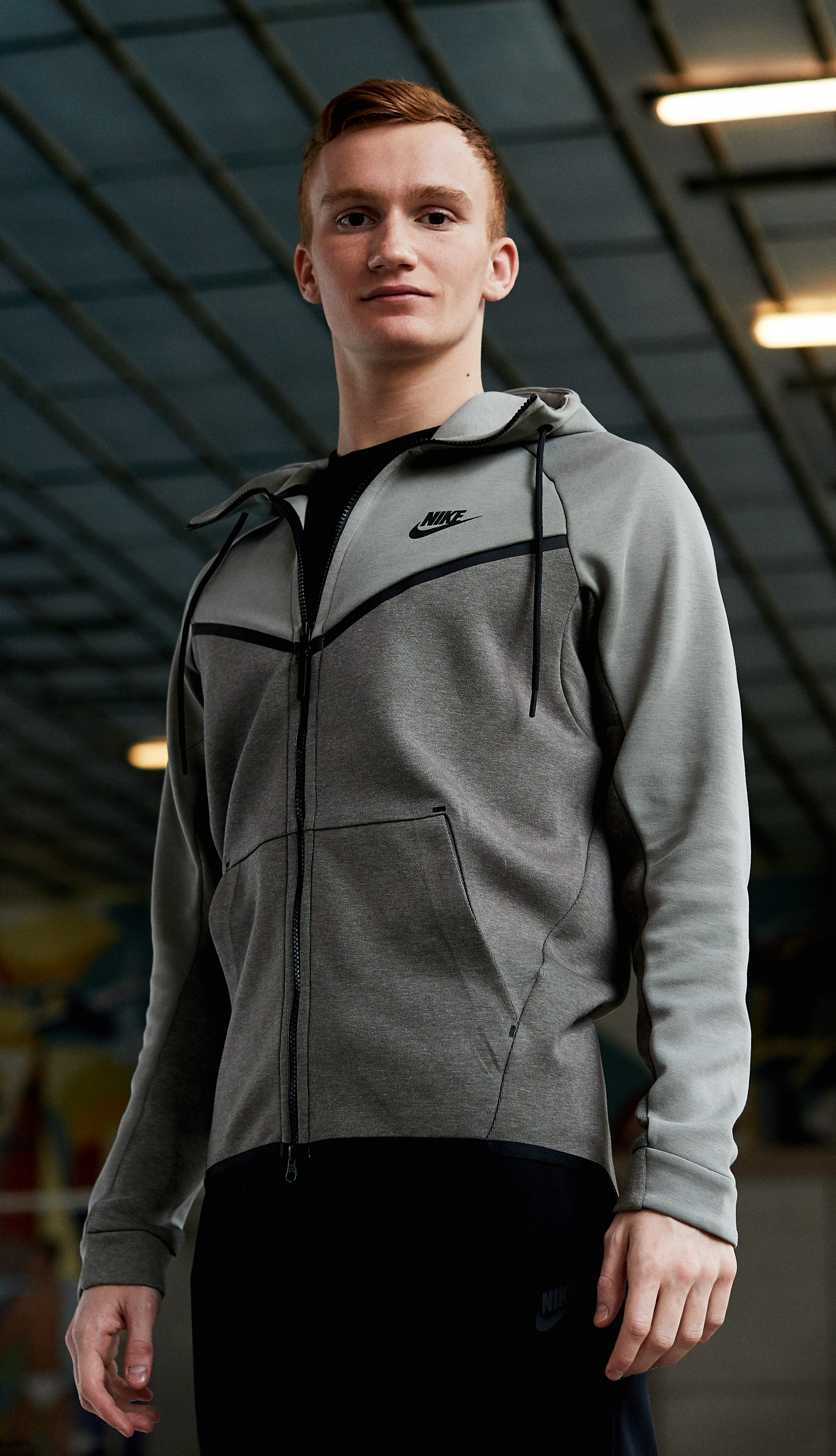

Personal information
- Full name: Aleksandr Evgenyevich Maltsev
- Nationality: Russian
- Born: 22 June 1995 (age 31) St. Petersburg, Russia
- Height: 1.75 m (5 ft 9 in)
- Weight: 64 kg (141 lb)

Sport
- Country: Russia and Individual Neutral Athletes
- Sport: Artistic swimming
- Club: MGFSO
Medal record
Representing Russia
World Championships
Gold medal – first place	2015 Kazan	Mixed duet free
Gold medal – first place	2017 Budapest	Mixed duet free
Gold medal – first place	2019 Gwangju	Mixed duet technical
Gold medal – first place	2019 Gwangju	Mixed duet free
Silver medal – second place	2015 Kazan	Mixed duet technical
Silver medal – second place	2017 Budapest	Mixed duet technical
European Championships
Gold medal – first place	2016 London	Mixed duet technical
Gold medal – first place	2016 London	Mixed duet free
Gold medal – first place	2018 Glasgow	Mixed duet free
Gold medal – first place	2018 Glasgow	Mixed duet technical
Gold medal – first place	2020 Budapest	Mixed duet technical
Gold medal – first place	2020 Budapest	Mixed duet free
Representing Neutral Athletes B
World Championships
Gold medal – first place	2025 Singapore	Solo technical
Gold medal – first place	2025 Singapore	Solo free
Gold medal – first place	2025 Singapore	Mixed duet technical
Silver medal – second place	2025 Singapore	Mixed duet free

Aleksandr Evgenyevich Maltsev (Russian: Александр Евгеньевич Мальцев, born 22 June 1995) is a 4-time world champion and 6-time European champion in artistic swimming (mixed duet) and a founder of men's artistic swimming in Russia. Aleksandr is the most titled male artistic swimmer in the world. He is recognized as the best male artistic swimmer in the world by the International Swimming Federation (FINA) (2015, 2017, 2019, 2021) and as the best male artistic swimmer in Europe by the European Swimming League (LEN) (2019, 2021).

== Career ==
Maltsev was enrolled by his mother in a synchronized swimming group at a local sports school in St. Petersburg when he was 7. At the time, they accepted everyone, boys and girls. At age of 10, Maltsev was selected for the St. Petersburg municipal team and at 15, he was training with Russia's female synchronized swimmers for the first time. Despite being the only male synchronized swimmer in the national team, Maltsev continued to pursue his career even with attempts to divert his attention to water polo and diving. He continued to train his favorite sport even though many people did not understand or support his desires.

In 2014, FINA officially approved of adding mixed-gender events in synchronized swimming and diving under its banner after a vote at the Extraordinary Congress in Doha (Qatar). Maltsev began pairing up with Darina Valitova. They competed at the Italian Open Test in Mixed Duet free where they took gold medals.

At the 2015 World Aquatics Championships in Kazan, Maltsev/Valitova represented Russia at the inaugural Mixed Duet in synchronized swimming, after leading the preliminaries in Mixed Duet technical, they finished second in the finals losing just 0.2122 points to Americans Bill May and Christina Jones. They avenged their loss by winning the gold in Mixed Duet free with a score of 91.7333 points ahead of May/Lum.

Maltsev partnered with Mikhaela Kalancha at the 2016 European Championships; where they won gold in mixed free and technical routines. In November 2016, the Maltsev/Kalancha pair performed the newly composed Swan Lake at the 11th FINA Synchronized Swimming World Trophy in Yangzhou (China) and won the title in 92.6000 points. The next year, they took part in the 2017 World Aquatics Championships in Budapest, and won gold and silver in the mixed free and technical routines respectively.

In 2018, he began partnering with Mayya Gurbanberdieva. Their duet took gold medals in free routine of two steps of the FINA Artistic Swimming World Series 2018 in Paris and Syros Island. At the 2018 European Championships there they won gold in mixed free and technical routines.

In 2019, the Maltsev/Gurbanberdieva duet won the Superfinal of the FINA Artistic Swimming World Series, winning 10 gold medals in technical and free duets at the steps of this series (Kazan, Tokyo, Beijing, Barcelona, Budapest). A month later, in Gwangju Maltsev and Gurbanberdieva won 2 gold medals at the same World Championships for the first time in the history of mixed duets, performing with the technical routine "Tango" and the free one "Sing, Sing, Sing".

== Education ==
He graduated from the Russian State University of Physical Education, Sport, Youth and Tourism. In 2017, he received a bachelor's degree in Physical culture. In 2019, he received a master's degree in Sports.

== Awards and titles ==
- Honored Master of Sports of Russia.
- The best male artistic swimmer in the world (2015, 2017, 2019, 2021) by the FINA.
- The best male artistic swimmer in Europe (2019, 2021) by the LEN.
