= Fernando Díaz del Río =

Spanish artistic swimmer

Personal information
- Full name: Fernando Díaz del Río Soto
- Nationality: Spanish
- Born: 15 February 2003 (age 23) Spain

Sport
- Country: Spain
- Sport: Artistic swimming
Medal record
Men's artistic swimming
Representing Spain
World Championships
Gold medal – first place	2023 Fukuoka	Solo technical routine
European Championships
Silver medal – second place	2022 Rome	Solo technical routine
Silver medal – second place	2022 Rome	Solo free routine

Fernando Díaz del Río Soto (born 15 February 2003) is a Spanish artistic swimmer. He was the first man to win a silver medal in a solo male artistic swimming event at a LEN European Aquatics Championships, winning the first silver medal in the solo technical routine, and afterwards the first silver medal in the solo free routine, at the 2022 European Aquatics Championships. He is an eight-time medalist at FINA Artistic Swimming World Series, including four gold medals, one silver medal, and three bronze medals spanning solo and mixed duet routines.

== Background ==
Díaz del Río formerly trained with the La Palma club and currently trains at Sant Cugat High Performance Center in Barcelona.

== Career ==
=== 2019–2021 ===
At the leg of the 2019 FINA Artistic Swimming World Series held at the Palace of Water Sports in mid-April in Kazan, Russia, Díaz del Río won a bronze medal in the mixed duet technical routine with a score of 74.3859 points on 19 April. One day later, he won a bronze medal in the mixed duet free routine with a score of 77.3667 points. In 2021, as part of the leg of the FINA Artistic Swimming World Series held in a virtual format and hosted by the United States in February, he scored 77.4407 points in the mixed duet technical routine, which ranked second overall, however he did not win a medal as only the highest scoring duo from each country was eligible for a medal, and he and his partner ranked as the second-highest scoring duo from Spain. Approximately three months later, at the leg of the World Series held in a virtual format and hosted by Canada, he and his partner achieved a score of 80.7076 points in the mixed duet technical routine, however were again ineligible for a medal as they were outscored by another team from Spain.

=== 2022 ===
==== 2022 Artistic Swimming World Series ====
For the first leg of the 2022 FINA Artistic Swimming World Series, conducted in virtual format by the United States and Canada in March, Díaz del Río performed his choreography in the solo technical routine to music by English musical artist Labrinth, earning 76.4571 points and winning the silver medal. The following month, he scored 76.2795 points in the solo technical routine at the leg of the World Series conducted at Piscine Georges Vallerey in Paris, France, winning the gold medal 15.4021 points ahead of silver medalist Javier Ruisanchez of Puerto Rico. In May, as part of the World Series leg conducted in virtual format by Australia, he won a gold medal in the solo technical routine with choreography to music by American band Aerosmith and a final score of 74.2865 points, which was less than five points ahead of silver medalist Eduard Kim of Kazakhstan. The following day, he won the bronze medal in the mixed duet free routine with a score of 81.7333 points, finishing just 1.5334 points behind gold medalists Tomoka Sato and Yotaro Sato of Japan.

Performing in-person later the same month at olympic Athletic Center of Athens in Athens, Greece, for the final leg of the 2022 World Series, Díaz del Río won the gold medal in the male solo technical routine with a personal best score of 77.9618 points from the World Series circuit. He earned his final medal of the circuit the following day, winning his first gold medal in the solo free routine with a score of 80.3333 points and a lead of over three points ahead of silver medalist Nicolò Ogliari of Italy.

==== 2022 European Aquatics Championships ====
As part of the artistic swimming program at the 2022 European Aquatics Championships, contested starting 11 August at Foro Italico in Rome, Italy, solo male events were included in competition for the first time at a LEN European Aquatics Championships. Performing his choreography in the first solo event, the solo technical routine on 12 August, to music by American band Aerosmith, he achieved a score of 79.4952 points to win the silver medal, 6.2082 points behind gold medalist Giorgio Minisini of Italy and 20.6117 points ahead of bronze medalist Ivan Martinović of Serbia. With his win, he became the first silver medalist in a solo male artistic swimming event, and first silver medalist in the men's solo technical routine, at a LEN European Aquatics Championships. On 14 August, he became the first silver medalist in the men's solo free routine at a LEN European Aquatics Championships, winning the silver medal in the event with choreography to music by America musical artist Danny Elfman and a final score of 83.3333 points, which was 5.3333 points ahead of bronze medalist Quentin Rakotomalala of France and 5.1334 points behind gold medalist Giorgio Minisini of Italy.

=== 2023 ===
==== 2023 Artistic Swimming World Cup ====
For the first stop of the first Artistic Swimming World Cup organized by World Aquatics, contested in March in Markham, Canada, Díaz del Río won the silver medal in the solo free routine on the second day of competition with a score of 168.4000 points, finishing behind Giorgio Minisini and ahead of Eduard Kim. Later in the day, he and his partner Emma García achieved a score of 188.7458 points in the mixed duet technical routine, however they were ineligible for a medal as they were not the highest-ranking duo in the event from Spain. The third and final day, he and Mireia Hernandez Luna ranked third in the mixed duet free routine with a 194.5083, however the bronze medal went to the duo from Belgium as they were not the highest-scoring Spaniards. For his final event, the mixed team acrobatic, he contributed to a final mark of 189.6875 points, which ranked sixth overall.

== International championships ==
Meet	solo technical routine	solo free routine
EC 2022	(silver) (79.4951)	(silver) (83.3333)

== World series and world cup circuits ==
The following medals Díaz del Río has won at Artistic Swimming World Series (through 2022) and Artistic Swimming World Cup (2023) circuits.

Edition	Gold medals	Silver medals	Bronze medals	Total
2019	0	0	2	2
2022	4	1	1	6
2023	0	1	0	1
Total	4	2	3	8
