= Isotta Sportelli =

Italian synchronized swimmer (born 2000)

Personal information
- Nationality: Italian
- Born: 2 January 2001 (age 25) Rome, Italy
- Height: 170 cm (5 ft 7 in)
- Weight: 54 kg (119 lb; 8 st 7 lb)

Sport
- Sport: Synchronized swimming
- Club: Fiamme Oro; Aurelia Nuoto
- Coached by: Rosella Pibiri
Medal record
Women's artistic swimming
Representing Italy
Event	1st	2nd	3rd
FINA World Trophy	-	2	-
European Games	-	2	1
World Aquatics Championships	-	1	-
Total	0	5	1
World Championships
Silver medal – second place	2023 Fukuoka	Team technical routine
European Games
Silver medal – second place	2023 Kraków-Małopolska	Team technical routine
Silver medal – second place	2023 Kraków-Małopolska	Team free routine
Bronze medal – third place	2023 Kraków-Małopolska	Team acrobatic routine
Bronze medal – third place	2021 Budapest	Mixed free routine
Bronze medal – third place	2021 Budapest	Mixed technical routine
FINA World Trophy
Silver medal – second place	2016 Yangzhou	Team free
Silver medal – second place	2016 Yangzhou	Team free combination
- Updated on 1 August 2024

Isotta Sportelli (born 2 January 2000) is an Italian synchronised swimmer. She competed at the 2024 Summer Olympics, the 2023 and 2024 World Aquatics Championships, and the 2023 European Games. She was a part of the Italian junior national team from 2016 to 2018, and has since graduated to the national team.

== Life ==
Sportelli was born in Rome, Italy, to her parents Vincenzo and Monica Sportelli. She is the youngest of five children. All four of her brothers play water polo, with her being the only sibling to "[choose] synchronized swimming from the age of five."

She has competed at the World Junior Championships, the European Junior Championships, and the European Cup. She has also won two silver medals at the 2016 FINA World Trophy tournament in Yangzhou, China.

In 2021, Sportelli won a bronze medal in the mixed duet competition at the European Aquatics Championships in Budapest, Hungary, with her partner Nicolò Ogliari.

As of 2021, she attended the Sapienza University in Rome, studying Pharmacy.
