= Quentin Rakotomalala =

French artistic swimmer

Personal information
- Nationality: French
- Born: 29 May 2003 (age 23) Marseille, France

Sport
- Country: France
- Sport: Artistic swimming
- Event(s): Solo free routine, Mixed duet technical routine, Mixed duet free routine
Medal record
Men's artistic swimming
Representing France
Event	1st	2nd	3rd
European Championships	0	0	1
Artistic Swimming World Series	0	2	0
Total	0	2	1
European Championships
Bronze medal – third place	2022 Rome	Solo free routine
Bronze medal – third place	2024 Belgrade	Solo free
Artistic Swimming World Series
Silver medal – second place	2020 Paris	Mixed duet technical routine
Silver medal – second place	2020 Paris	Mixed duet free routine

Quentin Rakotomalala (born 29 May 2003) is a French artistic swimmer. He was the first man to win a bronze medal in the solo free routine at a LEN European Aquatics Championships, winning the medal at the 2022 European Aquatics Championships.

== Background ==
Rakotomalala has expressed hopes that one day the Olympic Games will include men in solo and duet artistic swimming competition at the Games, specifying in 2022 his goal of competing at the 2028 Summer Olympics. In December 2022, the International Olympic Committee announced men could compete in the team event in the sport at the 2024 Olympic Games so long as the male competitors do not constitute more than 25% of the team event members, however, the Committee also continued the exclusion of men in solo and duet events, events Rakotomalala competes in.

== Career ==
=== 2020 Artistic Swimming World Series ===
Competing as a 16-year-old at the leg of the 2020 FINA Artistic Swimming World Series held in Paris, Rakotomalala and his partner Madeline Philippe won their first medal in the mixed duet technical routine, scoring 72.0468 points to win the silver medal behind gold medalists Emma García and Pau Ribes of Spain. They won their second medal later in the day in the mixed duet free routine with a score of 75.3000 points, this time finishing 10.1333 points behind the Spaniards.

=== 2022 European Aquatics Championships ===
The 2022 European Aquatics Championships, held in Rome, Italy, was the first edition of the LEN European Aquatics Championships to offer solo male artistic swimming events, and as such Rakotomalala entered to compete in the second ever solo male event, the solo free routine, which took place after the solo technical routine in the Championships program, and was the first time the solo free routine was ever conducted. In the final of the solo free routine, held on 12 August at Foro Italico, he scored a total of 78.0000 points, finishing 10.4667 points behind Giorgio Minisini of Italy, 5.3333 points behind Fernando Díaz del Río of Spain, and 9.4667 points ahead of Ivan Martinović of Serbia to win the first ever bronze medal in the event. He executed his bronze medal-winning choreography to music by Benjamin Clementine of Great Britain.

== International championships ==
Meet	solo free routine
EC 2022	(bronze) (78.0000)
