= Artistic swimming at the 2022 European Aquatics Championships – Men's solo free routine =

Men's solo free routine at the 2022 European Aquatics Championships
- Venue: Foro Italico
- Dates: 14 August
- Competitors: 4 from 4 nations
- Winning points: 88.4667

Medalists
gold medal	Giorgio Minisini	Italy
silver medal	Fernando Díaz del Río	Spain
bronze medal	Quentin Rakotomalala	France

The Men's solo free routine competition of the 2022 European Aquatics Championships was held on 14 August 2022.

It marked the first time male artistic swimmers competed in a solo free routine at a LEN European Aquatics Championships and the second solo event open to men, following the solo technical routine two days earlier.

== Results ==
The final was held on 14 August at 10:30.

Rank	Swimmers	Nationality	Points
1st place, gold medalist(s)	Giorgio Minisini	Italy	88.4667
2nd place, silver medalist(s)	Fernando Díaz del Río	Spain	83.3333
3rd place, bronze medalist(s)	Quentin Rakotomalala	France	78.0000
4	Ivan Martinović	Serbia	68.5333
