= Dennis González (artistic swimmer) =

Spanish artistic swimmer (born 2004)

Personal information
- Full name: Dennis González Boneu
- Nationality: Spanish
- Born: 11 May 2004 (age 22)

Sport
- Country: Spain
- Sport: Synchronised swimming
Medal record
Men's artistic swimming
Representing Spain
Event	1st	2nd	3rd
World Championships	2	6	3
European Championships	6	1	2
European Games	1	1	0
World Junior Championships	2	2	0
Total	11	10	5
World Championships
Gold medal – first place	2023 Fukuoka	Solo free
Gold medal – first place	2025 Singapore	Mixed duet free
Silver medal – second place	2023 Fukuoka	Mixed duet technical
Silver medal – second place	2024 Doha	Solo free
Silver medal – second place	2024 Doha	Mixed duet free
Silver medal – second place	2025 Singapore	Solo technical
Silver medal – second place	2025 Singapore	Mixed duet technical
Bronze medal – third place	2023 Fukuoka	Mixed duet free
Bronze medal – third place	2025 Singapore	Team acrobatic
Bronze medal – third place	2025 Singapore	Team free
European Championships
Gold medal – first place	2024 Belgrade	Solo technical
Gold medal – first place	2024 Belgrade	Mixed duet free
Gold medal – first place	2024 Belgrade	Mixed duet technical
Gold medal – first place	2025 Funchal	Mixed duet free
Gold medal – first place	2025 Funchal	Mixed duet technical
Gold medal – first place	2025 Funchal	Team free
Silver medal – second place	2026 Paris	Mixed duet free
Silver medal – second place	2026 Paris	Team acrobatic
Bronze medal – third place	2025 Funchal	Solo technical
Bronze medal – third place	2025 Funchal	Team acrobatic
European Games
Gold medal – first place	2023 Kraków-Małopolska	Mixed duet free
Silver medal – second place	2023 Kraków-Małopolska	Mixed duet technical
World Junior Championships
Gold medal – first place	2022 Quebec	Solo technical
Gold medal – first place	2022 Quebec	Solo free
Silver medal – second place	2022 Quebec	Mixed duet technical
Silver medal – second place	2022 Quebec	Mixed duet free

Dennis González Boneu (born 11 May 2004) is a Spanish artistic swimmer.

== Career ==
González competed at the 2023 World Aquatics Championships and won a gold medal in the solo free routine with a score of 193.0334 points. He became the first World Champion in the men's free solo routine. He also won a silver medal in the mixed duet technical routine, along with Emma García, and a bronze medal in the mixed duet free routine. He was subsequently named the 2023 World Aquatics Artistic Swimmer of the Year.

In February 2024, he competed at the 2024 World Aquatics Championships and won silver medals in the solo free and mixed duet free routines. In June 2024, he competed at the 2024 European Aquatics Championships and won gold medals in the solo technical, mixed duet free and mixed duet technical routines.

In April 2025, he competed at the World Aquatics Artistic Swimming World Cup in Egypt, and won a gold medal in the team routine. He became the first man to compete and win artistic swimming team gold with Spain. In June 2025, he competed at the 2025 European Artistic Swimming Championships and won gold medals in the mixed duet free routine, mixed duet technical routine and team free routine. He also won a bronze medal in the solo technical routine and team acrobatic routine.

He then competed at the 2025 World Aquatics Championships and won a gold medal in the mixed duet free routine, along with Iris Tió. He also won silver medals in the solo technical and mixed duet technical routines. He won bronze medals in the team acrobatic and team free routines. He was subsequently voted the best men's artistic swimmer at the 2025 European Aquatics Athlete of the Year Awards.

In August 2026, he competed at the 2026 European Aquatics Championships and won a silver medal in the mixed duet free routine, along with Tió.
