= FINA Synchronised Swimming World Trophy =

Swimming competion

The FINA Synchronised Swimming World Trophy is an annual, international synchronised swimming event, organized by FINA. To highlight the beauty of synchronised swimming, this competition differ from other top-level international competitions: scores are given for the Artistic Impression only, accessories or equipment are permitted, etc. It was first held in 2006.

For the event, 8-12 nations are invited to compete, based on their rankings from recent FINA World Championships and the Olympic Games.

== Editions ==
Number	Year	Events	Location	Dates
I	2006	D, T, FC	(Russia) Moscow	
II	2007	D, T, FC	(Brazil) Rio de Janeiro	
III	2008	DF, DT, TF, FC	(Spain) Madrid	December 5-7
IV	2009	S, DT, T, FC, SH	(Canada) Montreal	November 27-29
V	2010	DT, T, FC, SH	(Russia) Moscow	December 3-10
VI	2011	DT, T, FC, SH	(China) Beijing	December 9-11
VII	2012	DT, T, FC, SH	Mexico City	December 5-8
VIII	2013	DT, T, FC, SH	Mexico City	December 5-8
IX	2014	DT, T, FC, SH	(China) Beijing	December 13–14
X	2015	DT, T, FC, SH	(China) Shaoxing	December 12–13
XI	2016	DT, T, FC, SH	(China) Yangzhou	November 26–27

Event codes: S= Free-Solo, D= Duet, DF= Duet-Free, DT= Duet-Thematic, T= Team, TF= Team-Free, FC= Free Combination, SH=Synchro Highlight routine.
