= Synchronised swimming at the 2015 World Aquatics Championships – Mixed duet free routine =

Mixed duet free routine at the 2015 World Aquatics Championships
- Dates: 28–30 July
- Competitors: 20 from 10 nations
- Winning points: 91.7333

Medalists
| gold medal | Aleksandr Maltsev; Darina Valitova | Russia |
| silver medal | Kristina Lum; Bill May | United States |
| bronze medal | Giorgio Minisini; Mariangela Perrupato | Italy |

The Mixed duet free routine competition of the synchronised swimming events at the 2015 World Aquatics Championships was held on 28 and 30 July 2015.

== Results ==
The preliminary round was held on 28 July at 12:25. The final was held on 30 July at 19:15.

Green denotes finalists

| Rank | Nation | Swimmers | Preliminary | | Final | |
| Rank | Nation | Swimmers | Points | Rank | Points | Rank |
|---|---|---|---|---|---|---|
| 1st place, gold medalist(s) | Russia | Aleksandr Maltsev; Darina Valitova | 89.3667 | 2 | 91.7333 | 1 |
| 2nd place, silver medalist(s) | United States | Kristina Lum; Bill May | 90.5000 | 1 | 91.4667 | 2 |
| 3rd place, bronze medalist(s) | Italy | Giorgio Minisini; Mariangela Perrupato | 87.9667 | 4 | 89.3333 | 3 |
| 4 | France | Benoît Beaufils; Virginie Dedieu | 88.5333 | 3 | 88.5333 | 4 |
| 5 | Spain | Gemma Mengual; Pau Ribes | 86.9000 | 5 | 86.8000 | 5 |
| 6 | Ukraine | Kateryna Reznik; Anton Timofeyev | 85.5667 | 6 | 85.1333 | 6 |
| 7 | Japan | Atsushi Abe; Yumi Adachi | 84.9667 | 7 | 84.9000 | 7 |
| 8 | Canada | Stéphanie Leclair; René Prévost | 82.3333 | 8 | 82.5333 | 8 |
| 9 | Turkey | Gökçe Akgün; Yağmur Demircan | 76.5333 | 9 | 76.3667 | 9 |
| 10 | Czech Republic | Ondřej Cibulka; Sabina Holubová | 73.7000 | 10 | 71.5667 | 10 |
