= Artistic swimming at the 2025 World Aquatics Championships – Mixed duet technical routine =

Mixed duet technical routine at the Artistic swimming at the 2025 World Aquatics Championships
- Venue: World Aquatics Championships Arena
- Location: Singapore
- Dates: 23 July
- Competitors: 28 from 14 nations
- Teams: 14
- Winning points: 233.2100

Medalists
gold medal	Aleksandr Maltsev; Mayya Gurbanberdieva	Authorised Neutral Athletes
silver medal	Dennis González; Mireia Hernández	Spain
bronze medal	Filippo Pelati; Lucrezia Ruggiero	Italy

The Mixed duet technical routine competition at the 2025 World Aquatics Championships was held on 23 July 2025.

== Results ==
The final was started at 19:32.

Rank	Swimmers	Nationality	Points
1st place, gold medalist(s)	Aleksandr Maltsev; Mayya Gurbanberdieva	Neutral Athlete B	233.2100
2nd place, silver medalist(s)	Dennis González; Mireia Hernández	Spain	230.4634
3rd place, bronze medalist(s)	Filippo Pelati; Lucrezia Ruggiero	Italy	228.0275
4	Ranjuo Tomblin; Isabelle Thorpe	Great Britain	226.0899
5	Diego Villalobos; Joana Jiménez	Mexico	218.8959
6	Guo Muye; Guo Sitong	China	216.5234
7	Eduard Kim; Nargiza Bolatova	Kazakhstan	199.8050
8	Nicolás Campos; Theodora Garrido	Chile	199.7834
9	Yogev Dagan; Aya Mazor	Israel	186.7492
10	Kantinan Adisaisiributr; Pongpimporn Pongsuwan	Thailand	185.4400
11	Bernardo Santos; Gabriela Regly	Brazil	182.1041
12	Gustavo Sánchez; Emily Minante	Colombia	170.9792
13	José Borges; Talía Joa	Cuba	120.8859
14	Yaqil Alberto; Kyra van den Berg	Curaçao	108.2151
