= Artistic swimming at the 2024 European Aquatics Championships – Mixed duet technical routine =

Mixed duet technical routine at the 2024 European Aquatics Championships
- Venue: Sports Centre Milan Gale Muškatirović
- Dates: 14 June
- Competitors: 16 from 8 nations
- Winning points: 218.7658

Medalists
gold medal	Dennis González; Mireia Hernández	Spain
silver medal	Filippo Pelati; Sarah Maria Rizea	Italy
bronze medal	Beatrice Crass; Ranjuo Tomblin	Great Britain

The Mixed duet technical routine competition of the 2024 European Aquatics Championships was held on 14 June 2024.

== Results ==
The final was held on 14 June at 12:00.

Rank	Swimmers	Nationality	Points
1st place, gold medalist(s)	Dennis González; Mireia Hernández	Spain	218.7658
2nd place, silver medalist(s)	Filippo Pelati; Sarah Maria Rizea	Italy	217.1633
3rd place, bronze medalist(s)	Beatrice Crass; Ranjuo Tomblin	Great Britain	202.9817
4	Matea Butorac; Adrian Gavelle	Croatia	166.0767
5	Jelena Kontić; Ivan Martinović	Serbia	165.9100
6	Solene Guisard; Robin Wiehn	Germany	165.7016
7	Hristina Cherkezova; Dimitar Isaev	Bulgaria	152.5633
8	Sandra Freund; David Martinez Delgado	Sweden	152.1133
