= 2004 FINA World Junior Synchronised Swimming Championships =

International synchronised swimming competition

The 9th FINA World Junior Synchronised Swimming Championships was held July 21-25, 2004 in Moscow, Russia. The synchronised swimmers are aged between 15 and 18 years old, from 31 nations, swimming in four events: Solo, Duet, Team and Free combination.

== Participating nations ==
31 nations swam at the 2004 World Junior Championships were:

- Australia
- Austria
- Belarus
- Brazil
- Canada
- China
- Costa Rica
- Egypt
- France
- Germany
- Great Britain
- Greece
- Israel
- Italy
- Japan
- Kazakhstan
- Macau
- Malaysia
- Mexico
- Netherlands
- Portugal
- Russia
- Serbia and Montenegro
- Slovakia
- Spain
- Switzerland
- Thailand
- Ukraine
- USA
- Uzbekistan

== Results ==
Event	Gold		Silver		Bronze	
Solo details	Natalia Ishchenko; Russia	89.902	Christina Jones (United States) USA	86.346	(Canada) CAN	84.599
Duet details	Svetlana Romashina; Aleksandra Elchinova; Russia	88.431	Annabelle Orme; Christina Jones (United States) USA	85.086	Takako Konishi; Chisa Ichikava; Japan	84.386
Team details	Russia	87.596	Japan	84.760	China	84.480
Free combination details	Russia	96.600	Japan	94.900	China	94.000
