= Artistic swimming at the 2024 European Aquatics Championships – Men's solo technical routine =

Men's solo technical routine at the 2024 European Aquatics Championships
- Venue: Sports Centre Milan Gale Muškatirović
- Dates: 11 June
- Competitors: 7 from 7 nations
- Winning points: 225.8466

Medalists
| gold medal | Dennis González | Spain |
| silver medal | Ranjuo Tomblin | Great Britain |
| bronze medal | Giorgio Minisini | Italy |

The Men's solo technical routine competition of the 2024 European Aquatics Championships was held on 11 June 2024.

== Results ==
The final was held on 11 June at 18:15.

| Rank | Swimmers | Nationality | Points |
|---|---|---|---|
| 1st place, gold medalist(s) | Dennis González | Spain | 225.8466 |
| 2nd place, silver medalist(s) | Ranjuo Tomblin | Great Britain | 204.4466 |
| 3rd place, bronze medalist(s) | Giorgio Minisini | Italy | 185.9800 |
| 4 | Quentin Rakotomalala | France | 167.1733 |
| 5 | David Martinez Delgado | Sweden | 162.4284 |
| 6 | Renaud Barral | Belgium | 138.3133 |
| 7 | Dimitar Isaev | Bulgaria | 107.1283 |
