= Artistic swimming at the 2026 European Aquatics Championships – Men's solo technical routine =

Men's solo technical routine at the 2026 European Aquatics Championships
- Venue: Paris Aquatic Centre
- Dates: 31 July
- Competitors: 7 from 7 nations
- Winning points: 249.3951

Medalists
gold medal	Ranjuo Tomblin	Great Britain
silver medal	Filippo Pelati	Italy
bronze medal	Zakhar Trofimov	Authorised Neutral Athletes

The Men's solo technical routine competition at the 2026 European Aquatics Championships was held on 31 July 2026.

== Results ==
The event was held at 19:50.

Rank	Swimmer	Nationality	Points
1st place, gold medalist(s)	Ranjuo Tomblin	Great Britain	249.3951
2nd place, silver medalist(s)	Filippo Pelati	Italy	241.7008
3rd place, bronze medalist(s)	Zakhar Trofimov	Neutral Athletes B	235.7858
4	Dennis González	Spain	235.3817
5	David Martinez Delgado	Sweden	200.3575
6	Jude Bonnici Peresso	Malta	163.0083
7	Dimitar Isaev	Bulgaria	161.0833
