= Artistic swimming at the 2023 European Games – Mixed duet free routine =

Mixed duet free at the 2023 European Games
- Venue: Oświęcim
- Dates: 24 June
- Competitors: 18 from 9 nations
- Teams: 9
- Winning points: 210.3918

Medalists
gold medal	Dennis González; Mireia Hernández	Spain
silver medal	Giorgio Minisini; Lucrezia Ruggiero	Italy
bronze medal	Beatrice Crass; Ranjuo Tomblin	Great Britain

The Mixed duet free routine competition of the 2023 European Games was held on 24 June 2023 in Oświęcim, Poland. For the first time male competitors took part in the sport at this level.

== Results ==
All nine entered duets went through to the final.

Rank	Nation	Swimmers	D	E	A	P	Total
1st place, gold medalist(s)	Spain	Dennis González; Mireia Hernández	31.950	122.5918	87.8000	-5.8	210.3918
2nd place, silver medalist(s)	Italy	Giorgio Minisini; Lucrezia Ruggiero	21.300	82.7374	89.2500	-5.0	171.9874
3rd place, bronze medalist(s)	Great Britain	Beatrice Crass; Ranjuo Tomblin	24.850	85.0688	78.9000	-7.7	163.9688
4	Serbia	Jelena Kontić; Ivan Martinović	23.100	67.5104	76.6000	-10.6	144.1104
5	Belgium	Renaud Barral; Lisa Ingenito	19.950	63.6814	76.1000	-7.4	139.7814
6	Germany	Frithjof Seidel; Michelle Zimmer	15.280	44.5250	75.0500	-8.5	119.5750
7	Bulgaria	Hristina Cherkezova; Dimitar Isaev	5.750	8.8729	65.4000	-9.7	74.2729
