= Synchronised swimming at the 2015 World Aquatics Championships – Mixed duet technical routine =

Mixed duet technical routine at the 2015 World Aquatics Championships
- Dates: 25–26 July
- Competitors: 12 from 6 nations
- Winning points: 88.5108

Medalists
gold medal	Christina Jones; Bill May	United States
silver medal	Aleksandr Maltsev; Darina Valitova	Russia
bronze medal	Manila Flamini; Giorgio Minisini	Italy

The Mixed duet technical routine competition of the synchronised swimming events at the 2015 World Aquatics Championships was held on 25 and 26 July 2015.

== Results ==
The preliminary round was held on 25 July at 11:45. The final was held on 26 July at 19:15.

Green denotes finalists

Rank	Nation	Swimmers	Preliminary		Final	
Rank	Nation	Swimmers	Points	Rank	Points	Rank
1st place, gold medalist(s)	United States	Christina Jones; Bill May	86.7108	2	88.5108	1
2nd place, silver medalist(s)	Russia	Aleksandr Maltsev; Darina Valitova	88.8539	1	88.2986	2
3rd place, bronze medalist(s)	Italy	Manila Flamini; Giorgio Minisini	85.4125	3	86.3640	3
4	Ukraine	Oleksandra Sabada; Anton Timofeyev	84.0767	4	83.7653	4
5	Japan	Atsushi Abe; Yumi Adachi	81.8724	5	82.3509	5
6	Turkey	Gökçe Akgün; Yağmur Demircan	71.4913	6	74.7756	6
