= Artistic swimming at the 2023 European Games – Mixed duet technical routine =

Mixed duet technical at the 2023 European Games
- Venue: Oswiecim
- Dates: 22 June
- Competitors: 16 from 8 nations
- Teams: 8
- Winning points: 242.3599

Medalists
gold medal	Giorgio Minisini; Lucrezia Ruggiero	Italy
silver medal	Emma García; Dennis González	Spain
bronze medal	Beatrice Crass; Ranjuo Tomblin	Great Britain

The mixed duet free routine competition of the 2023 European Games was held on 22 June 2023 in Oswiecim, Poland. For the first time male competitors took part in the sport at this level.

== Results ==
All eight entered duets went through to the final.

Rank	Nation	Swimmers	D	E	A	P	Total
1st place, gold medalist(s)	Italy	Giorgio Minisini; Lucrezia Ruggiero	28.900	141.7099	100.6500	-4.6	242.3599
2nd place, silver medalist(s)	Spain	Emma García; Dennis González	23.200	120.8867	95.7000	-4.7	216.5867
3rd place, bronze medalist(s)	Great Britain	Beatrice Crass; Ranjuo Tomblin	26.800	117.0916	86.4000	-5.0	203.4916
4	France	Valirina Rakotomalala; Manon Disbeaux	20.700	99.4833	85.4500	-5.8	184.9333
5	Serbia	Jelena Kontić; Ivan Martinović	20.850	91.2467	83.6000	-4.9	174.8467
6	Belgium	Renaud Barral; Lisa Ingenito	18.100	88.5366	84.5000	-6.4	173.0366
7	Germany	Frithjof Seidel; Michelle Zimmer	18.050	78.8034	80.5000	-5.5	159.3034
8	Bulgaria	Hristina Cherkezova; Dimitar Isaev	13.200	54.6566	76.0000	-6.0	130.6566
