= Synchronized swimming at the 2007 Pan American Games =

- Venue: Maria Lenk Aquatic Park
- No. of events: 2

Synchronized swimming at the 2007 Pan American Games took place at the Maria Lenk Aquatic Park.

== Medal table ==
| Rank | Nation | Gold | Silver | Bronze | Total |
|---|---|---|---|---|---|
| 1 | United States | 2 | 0 | 0 | 2 |
| 2 | Canada | 0 | 2 | 0 | 2 |
| 3 | Brazil | 0 | 0 | 2 | 2 |
| Totals (3 entries) | | 2 | 2 | 2 | 6 |

== Medalists ==
| Event | Gold | Silver | Bronze |
|---|---|---|---|
| Duet | United States (USA); Christina Jones; Andrea Nott | Canada (CAN); Marie-Pier Boudreau Gagnon; Isabelle Rampling | Brazil (BRA); Caroline Hildebrandt; Lara Teixeira |
| Team | United States (USA); Brooke Abel; Janet Culp; Kate Hooven; Christina Jones; Becky Kim; Meghan Kinney; Andrea Nott; Annabelle Orme; Jillian Penner; Kim Probst | Canada (CAN); Marie-Pier Boudreau Gagnon; Jessika Dubuc; Marie-Pierre Gagné; Dominika Kopcik; Ève Lamoureux; Tracy Little; Élise Marcotte; Isabelle Rampling; Jennifer Song | Brazil (BRA); Beatriz Feres; Branca Feres; Caroline Hildebrant; Giovana Stephan; Glaucia Souza; Lara Teixeira; Michelle Frota; Nayara Figueira; Pamela Nogueira |

== Final classification ==
=== Duets ===
| Place | Team | Points |
|---|---|---|
| 1st place, gold medalist(s) | United States | 95.500 |
| 2nd place, silver medalist(s) | Canada | 95.084 |
| 3rd place, bronze medalist(s) | Brazil | 90.667 |
| 4 | Mexico | 88.251 |
| 5 | Cuba | 87.001 |
| 6 | Venezuela | 83.251 |
| 7 | Colombia | 82.167 |
| 8 | Chile | 78.583 |
| 9 | Argentina | 77.751 |
| 10 | Aruba | 76.501 |
| 11 | Costa Rica | 73.250 |

=== Teams ===
| Place | Team | Points |
|---|---|---|
| 1st place, gold medalist(s) | United States | 95.667 |
| 2nd place, silver medalist(s) | Canada | 95.251 |
| 3rd place, bronze medalist(s) | Brazil | 90.750 |
| 4 | Mexico | 89.000 |
| 5 | Cuba | 83.667 |
| 6 | Venezuela | 83.417 |
| 7 | Colombia | 82.667 |
| 8 | Aruba | 78.000 |
