= 2007 FINA Synchronised Swimming World Trophy =

The 2nd FINA Synchronised Swimming World Trophy was held 2007 in Rio de Janeiro, Brazil. It featured swimmers from 8 nations, swimming in three events: Duet, Team and Free Combination.

== Participating nations ==
8 nations swam at the 2007 Synchro World Trophy:

- Brazil
- Egypt
- Italy
- Japan
- Mexico
- Russia
- Spain
- USA

== Results ==
Event	Gold		Silver		Bronze	
Duet details	Anastasia Davydova; Anastasia Ermakova; Russia	98.334	Gemma Mengual; Andrea Fuentes; Spain	98.000	Christina Jones; Andrea Nott (United States) USA	96.666
Team details	Spain	99.667	Russia	99.000	(United States) USA	96.000
Free combination details	Russia	99.000	(United States) USA	98.667	Spain	97.333

== Final standings ==
Place	Nation	Total
1	Russia	296.333
2	Spain	295.000
3	(United States) USA	291.334
