= Ivan Martinović =

Ivan Martinović may refer to:

- Ivan Martinović (handballer) (born 1999), Croatian handball player
- Ivan Martinović (swimmer) (born 2001), Serbian artistic swimmer
