= 1999 FINA World Junior Synchronised Swimming Championships =

The 6th FINA World Junior Synchronised Swimming Championships was held July 7–11, 1999 in Cali, Colombia. The synchronised swimmers are aged between 15 and 18 years old, from 15 nations, swimming in three events: Solo, Duet and Team.

== Participating nations ==
15 nations swam at the 1999 World Junior Championships were:

- Brazil
- Chile
- China
- Colombia
- Czech Republic
- France
- Italy
- Korea
- Mexico
- Russia
- Slovakia
- Spain
- Ukraine
- USA
- Venezuela

== Results ==
Event	Gold		Silver		Bronze	
Solo details	Anastasia Davydova; Russia	89.63	Charlotte Fabre; France	87.64	Lorena Zaffalon; Italy	86.95
Duet details	Anastasia Davydova; Anastasia Ermakova; Russia	89.09	He Xiaochu; Wang Ha; China	86.60	Lorena Zaffalon; Joey Paccagnella; Italy	86.10
Team details	Russia	89.04	China	87.14	Italy	86.08
