= Artistic swimming at the 2024 European Aquatics Championships – Mixed duet free routine =

Mixed duet free routine at the 2024 European Aquatics Championships
- Venue: Sports Centre Milan Gale Muškatirović
- Dates: 12 June
- Competitors: 14 from 7 nations
- Winning points: 189.7938

Medalists
gold medal	Dennis González; Emma García	Spain
silver medal	Filippo Pelati; Flaminia Vernice	Italy
bronze medal	Beatrice Crass; Ranjuo Tomblin	Great Britain

The Mixed duet free routine competition of the 2024 European Aquatics Championships was held on 12 June 2024.

== Results ==
The final was held on 12 June at 18:17.

Rank	Swimmers	Nationality	Points
1st place, gold medalist(s)	Dennis González; Emma García	Spain	189.7938
2nd place, silver medalist(s)	Filippo Pelati; Flaminia Vernice	Italy	188.6250
3rd place, bronze medalist(s)	Beatrice Crass; Ranjuo Tomblin	Great Britain	175.1563
4	Jelena Kontić; Ivan Martinović	Serbia	139.4772
5	Daniel Ascenso; Filipa Faria	Portugal	136.6147
6	Solene Guisard; Robin Wiehn	Germany	130.1478
7	Hristina Cherkezova; Dimitar Isaev	Bulgaria	85.5208
