= Jill Penner =

American synchronized swimmer

Personal information
- Born: November 14, 1987 (age 38) Seattle, Washington, United States

Sport
- Sport: Synchronised swimming
Medal record
Representing United States
World Championships
Bronze medal – third place	2007 Melbourne	Team, free routine
Pan American Games
Gold medal – first place	2007 Rio de Janeiro	Team

Jillian "Jill" Penner (born November 14, 1987) is an American synchronized swimmer who competed in the 2008 Summer Olympics.
