= Kim Probst =

American synchronized swimmer

Personal information
- Born: March 6, 1981 (age 45) Troy, New York, United States

Sport
- Sport: Synchronised swimming
Medal record
Representing United States
World Championships
Bronze medal – third place	2007 Melbourne	Team, free routine
Pan American Games
Gold medal – first place	2007 Rio de Janeiro	Team

Kimberly "Kim" Probst (born 6 March 1981) is an American synchronized swimmer who competed in the 2008 Summer Olympics.
