= Artistic swimming at the 2022 European Aquatics Championships – Mixed duet free routine =

Mixed duet free routine at the 2022 European Aquatics Championships
- Venue: Foro Italico
- Dates: 13 August
- Competitors: 10 from 5 nations
- Winning points: 89.7333

Medalists
gold medal	Giorgio Minisini; Lucrezia Ruggiero	Italy
silver medal	Emma García; Pau Ribes	Spain
bronze medal	Jozef Solymosy; Silvia Solymosyová	Slovakia

The Mixed duet free routine competition of the 2022 European Aquatics Championships was held on 13 August 2022.

== Results ==
The event was held on 13 August at 16:05.

Rank	Swimmers	Nationality	Points
1st place, gold medalist(s)	Italy	Giorgio Minisini; Lucrezia Ruggiero	89.7333
2nd place, silver medalist(s)	Spain	Emma García; Pau Ribes	84.7667
3rd place, bronze medalist(s)	Slovakia	Jozef Solymosy; Silvia Solymosyová	77.0333
4	Germany	Frithjof Seidel; Michelle Zimmer	74.7667
5	Belgium	Renaud Barral; Lisa Ingenito	73.7333
