= Ethan Calleja =

Australian synchronised swimmer

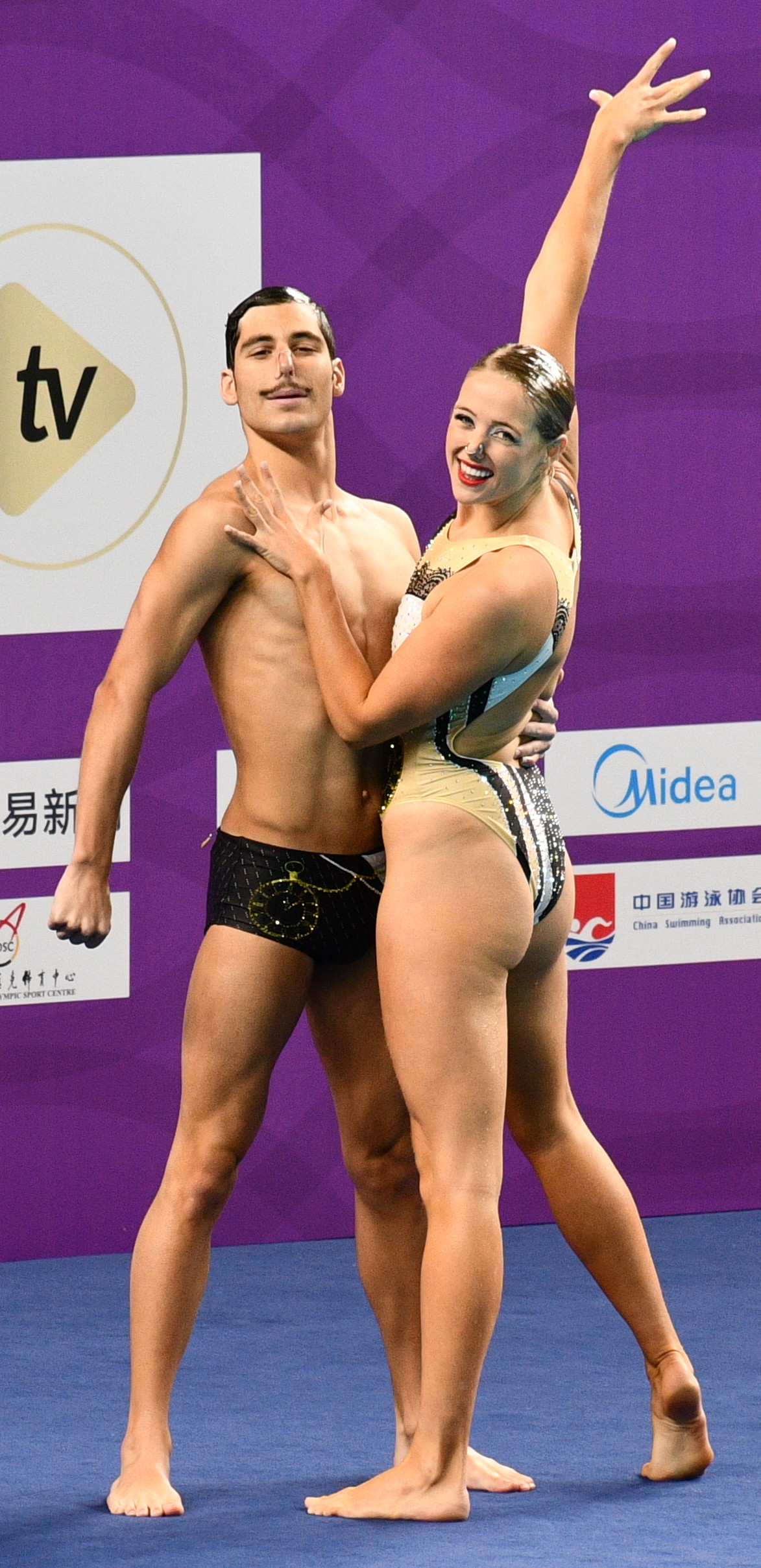
- Calleja and Kettlewell at the 2019 FINA World Series China Open event

Personal information
- Full name: Ethan Christopher Calleja
- National team: Australia
- Born: 2 December 1999 (age 26) Perth, Western Australia

Sport
- Sport: Artistic swimming
- Club: SupaNova Synchronised Swimming Club
- Coached by: Briana Preiss

Ethan Christopher Calleja (born 2 December 1999) is an Australian synchronised swimmer. He is the first male synchronised swimmer to compete internationally for Australia. Together with Danielle Kettlewell he placed fifth in the mixed duet event at the 2019 FINA World Aquatic Championships.

== Career ==
=== Swimming ===
Calleja had a 13-year-long swimming career in Australia. Calleja broke 25 records over his career of which a number remain. He represented Western Australia at five School Sport Australia Swimming championships, and was elected as the team captain in 2016 and 2017. He also competed at the 2014 and 2016 Australian Swimming Championships.

=== Synchronised swimming ===
Calleja and Kettlewell won the mixed duet event at the 2019 Hancock Prospecting Artistic Swimming Australian National Championships. They participated in the 2019 FINA World Series – China Open, and placed fifth in the free mixed duet event, becoming the first two Australians to compete in this event internationally. They also reached the final of the mixed duet free routine event.

Calleja appeared in the documentary Treading Water, conducted by students at Edith Cowan University and directed by Corina Stagg.
