= Artistic swimming at the 2026 European Aquatics Championships – Mixed duet free routine =

Mixed duet free routine at the 2026 European Aquatics Championships
- Venue: Paris Aquatic Centre
- Dates: 1 August
- Competitors: 12 from 6 nations
- Teams: 6
- Winning points: 258.2383

Medalists
gold medal	Isabelle Thorpe; Ranjuo Tomblin	Great Britain
silver medal	Iris Tió; Dennis González	Spain
bronze medal	Lucrezia Ruggiero; Filippo Pelati	Italy

The Mixed duet free routine competition at the 2026 European Aquatics Championships was held on 1 August 2026.

== Results ==
The final was started at 16:00.

Rank	Swimmers	Nationality	Points
1st place, gold medalist(s)	Isabelle Thorpe; Ranjuo Tomblin	Great Britain	258.2383
2nd place, silver medalist(s)	Iris Tió; Dennis González	Spain	257.9733
3rd place, bronze medalist(s)	Lucrezia Ruggiero; Filippo Pelati	Italy	255.1641
4	Alina Rumiantseva; Zakhar Trofimov	Neutral Athletes B	238.0834
5	Cheila Vieira; Daniel Ascenso	Portugal	181.5924
6	Magdalena Maleva; Dimitar Isaev	Bulgaria	157.0717
