= Artistic swimming at the 2022 European Aquatics Championships – Mixed duet technical routine =

Mixed duet technical routine at the 2022 European Aquatics Championships
- Venue: Foro Italico
- Dates: 15 August
- Competitors: 10 from 5 nations
- Winning points: 89.3679

Medalists
| gold medal | Giorgio Minisini; Lucrezia Ruggiero | Italy |
| silver medal | Emma García; Pau Ribes | Spain |
| bronze medal | Jozef Solymosy; Silvia Solymosyová | Slovakia |

The Mixed duet technical routine competition of the 2022 European Aquatics Championships was held on 15 August 2022.

== Results ==
The event was held on 15 August at 11:00.

| Rank | Swimmers | Nationality | Points |
|---|---|---|---|
| 1st place, gold medalist(s) | Italy | Giorgio Minisini; Lucrezia Ruggiero | 89.3679 |
| 2nd place, silver medalist(s) | Spain | Emma García; Pau Ribes | 83.7548 |
| 3rd place, bronze medalist(s) | Slovakia | Jozef Solymosy; Silvia Solymosyová | 75.5914 |
| 4 | Belgium | Renaud Barral; Lisa Ingenito | 73.5119 |
| 5 | Serbia | Jelena Kontić; Ivan Martinović | 68.1061 |
