= Artistic swimming at the 2026 European Aquatics Championships – Mixed duet technical routine =

Mixed duet technical routine at the 2026 European Aquatics Championships
- Venue: Paris Aquatic Centre
- Dates: 2 August
- Competitors: 16 from 16 nations
- Teams: 8
- Winning points: 229.6783

Medalists
gold medal	Isabelle Thorpe; Ranjuo Tomblin	Great Britain
silver medal	Lucrezia Ruggiero; Filippo Pelati	Italy
bronze medal	Alina Rumiantseva; Zakhar Trofimov	Individual Neutral Athletes

The Mixed duet technical routine competition at the 2026 European Aquatics Championships was held on 2 August 2026.

== Results ==
The final was started at 16:00.

Rank	Swimmers	Nationality	Points
1st place, gold medalist(s)	Isabelle Thorpe; Ranjuo Tomblin	Great Britain	229.6783
2nd place, silver medalist(s)	Lucrezia Ruggiero; Filippo Pelati	Italy	229.0092
3rd place, bronze medalist(s)	Alina Rumiantseva; Zakhar Trofimov	Neutral Athletes B	215.9201
4	Carla Lorenzo; Jordi Cáceres	Spain	210.8584
5	Lior Makmel; Yogev Dagan	Israel	193.8017
6	Maria Beatriz Gonçalves; Daniel Ascenso	Portugal	174.5467
7	Solène Guisard; Robin Wiehn	Germany	151.6250
8	Iren Davidkova; Dimitar Isaev	Bulgaria	146.3958
