= Artistic swimming at the 2024 European Aquatics Championships – Men's solo free routine =

Men's solo free routine at the 2024 European Aquatics Championships
- Venue: Sports Centre Milan Gale Muškatirović
- Dates: 13 June
- Competitors: 6 from 6 nations
- Winning points: 191.0293

Medalists
gold medal	Ranjuo Tomblin	Great Britain
silver medal	Giorgio Minisini	Italy
bronze medal	Quentin Rakotomalala	France

The Men's solo free routine competition of the 2024 European Aquatics Championships was held on 13 June 2024.

== Results ==
The final was held on 13 June at 11:53.

Rank	Swimmers	Nationality	Points
1st place, gold medalist(s)	Ranjuo Tomblin	Great Britain	191.0293
2nd place, silver medalist(s)	Giorgio Minisini	Italy	183.5313
3rd place, bronze medalist(s)	Quentin Rakotomalala	France	174.4708
4	David Martinez Delgado	Sweden	139.9187
5	Renaud Barral	Belgium	134.2478
6	Frithjof Seidel	Germany	112.6625
