= 2025 European Artistic Swimming Championships =

Water sport competitions

- Location: Funchal, Portugal
- Dates: 2–5 June
- Nations: 21
- Website: Home page

The 2025 European Artistic Swimming Championships took place in Funchal in Portugal at the Penteada Olympic Swimming Pools Complex from 2 to 5 June 2025. his event marked the first standalone edition of the European Artistic Swimming Championships, following its evolution from the European Cup. Organized by European Aquatics (formerly LEN) in collaboration with the Portuguese Swimming Federation, the competition featured 136 athletes from 21 nations competing across 11 events.

== Medal summary ==
Event	Gold		Silver		Bronze	
Men
Solo free routine	Jordi Cáceres; Spain	188.9500	Filippo Pelati; Italy	187.1288	Ranjuo Tomblin; Great Britain	173.3837
Solo technical routine	Ranjuo Tomblin; Great Britain	234.4225	Filippo Pelati; Italy	232.6259	Dennis González; Spain	213.6642
Women
Solo free routine	Klara Bleyer; Germany	219.8363	Enrica Piccoli; Italy	212.9451	Iris Tió; Spain	208.9075
Solo technical routine	Vasiliki Alexandri; Austria	257.2400	Iris Tió; Spain	249.0917	Klara Bleyer; Germany	246.9650
Duet free routine	Italy; Enrica Piccoli; Lucrezia Ruggiero	250.6683	Spain; Lilou Lluís; Iris Tió	248.3325	Germany; Klara Bleyer; Amélie Blumenthal Haz	237.0950
Duet technical routine	Austria; Anna-Maria Alexandri; Eirini-Marina Alexandri	301.8800	Spain; Meritxell Ferré; Lilou Lluís	282.1017	France; Anastasia Bayandina; Romane Lunel	277.1442
Open and Mixed
Mixed duet free routine	Spain; Dennis González; Iris Tió	290.4242	Italy; Filippo Pelati; Lucrezia Ruggiero	288.8300	Great Britain; Holly Hughes; Ranjuo Tomblin	283.0990
Mixed duet technical routine	Spain; Dennis González; Mireia Hernández	216.1967	Great Britain; Isabelle Thorpe; Ranjuo Tomblin	214.9441	Italy; Filippo Pelati; Lucrezia Ruggiero	205.9059
Team free routine	Spain; Cristina Arámbula; Meritxell Ferré; Marina García; Dennis González; Alisa Ozhogina; Paula Ramírez; Sara Saldaña; Iris Tió	320.1147	Italy; Valentina Bisi; Beatrice Esegio; Marta Iacoacci; Alessia Macchi; Sofia Mastroianni; Susanna Pedotti; Sophie Tabbiani; Giulia Vernice	277.7194	Israel; Yogev Dagan; Catherine Kunin; Alexandra Lerman; Noga Levy; Lior Makmel; Aya Mazor; Shaya Sar Shalom Nechmad; Yaara Sharabi	223.7710
Team technical routine	Spain; Cristina Arámbula; Meritxell Ferré; Marina García; Lilou Lluís; Alisa Ozhogina; Paula Ramírez; Sara Saldaña; Iris Tió	290.3810	Ukraine; Oleksandra Goretska; Mariia Hrynishyna; Uliana Hrynishyna; Alisa Kulyk; Yelyzaveta Lymar; Daria Moshynska; Daria Prynko; Anastasiia Shmonina	266.2233	France; Angéline Bertinelli; Jeanne Clair; Ambre Esnault; Héloïse Guillot; Claudia Janvier; Romane Lunel; Romane Temessek; Lou Thuillier	265.7233
Acrobatic routine	Italy; Beatrice Andina; Marta Iacoacci; Alessia Macchi; Giorgia Lucia Macino; Sofia Mastroianni; Susanna Pedotti; Sophie Tabbiani; Giulia Vernice	208.4609	Ukraine; Ivanna Burba; Olexandra Goretska; Uliana Hrynishyna; Alisa Kulyk; Yelyzaveta Lymar; Daria Moshynska; Anastasiya Shmonina; Mariya Zdorovtsova	202.7965	Spain; Cristina Arámbula; Meritxell Ferré; Marina García; Dennis González; Lilou Lluís; Meritxell Mas; Paula Ramírez; Sara Saldaña	202.6892

== Medal table ==
* Host nation (Portugal)

Rank	Nation	Gold	Silver	Bronze	Total
1	Spain	5	3	3	11
2	Italy	2	5	1	8
3	Austria	2	0	0	2
4	Great Britain	1	1	2	4
5	Germany	1	0	2	3
6	Ukraine	0	2	0	2
7	France	0	0	2	2
8	Israel	0	0	1	1
Totals (8 entries)		11	11	11	33
