= 2026 World Aquatics Artistic Swimming Junior Championships =

International synchronised swimming competition

19th World Aquatics Artistic Swimming Junior Championships
- Host city: Budapest, Hungary
- Date: 12–16 August 2026
- Venue: Duna Aréna
- Events: 11

The 19th World Aquatics Artistic Swimming Junior Championships were held from 12 to 16 August 2026 at Duna Arena in Budapest, Hungary. The competition is open to females between 15 and 19 years of age, and males between 15 and 20 years of age, inclusive, per their age at the end of the 2026 calendar year.

== Schedule ==
P	Preliminaries	F	Final

Date Event	Wed 12	Thu 13	Fri 14	Sat 15	Sun 16
Women's Solo Technical	F				
Women's Solo Free		P			F
Women's Duet Technical		F			
Women's Duet Free			P	F	
Women's Team Technical	F				
Women's Team Free			P		F
Women's Team Acrobatic				F	
Men's Solo Technical	F				
Men's Solo Free					F
Mixed Duet Technical			F		
Mixed Duet Free				F	

== Results ==
=== Women ===
Event	Gold		Silver		Bronze	
Solo technical	Aleksandra Zavialova; Russia	251.9833	He Zhien; China	241.5683	Daniela Suárez; Spain	240.0559
Solo free	Ekaterina Shtatnova; Russia	283.3826	Naia Álvarez; Spain	268.6363	Zhou Kunyi; China	261.4876
Duet technical	Russia; Kristina Chekhanova; Anastasiia Sidorina	300.1509	China; He Zhien; Zhou Kunyi	289.7367	Spain; Naia Álvarez; Daniela Suárez	289.3125
Duet free	Spain; Naia Álvarez; Daniela Suárez	298.6813	China; He Zhien; Zhou Kunyi	295.0701	Russia; Kristina Chekhanova; Anastasiia Sidorina	294.0996
Team technical	Russia	290.1267	China	283.0642	Spain	273.0474
Team free	Russia	277.6814	China	261.3654	Spain	251.1846
Team acrobatic	Russia	232.2147	Kazakhstan	203.0926	Belarus	200.9777

=== Men ===
Event	Gold		Silver		Bronze	
Solo technical	Zakhar Trofimov; Russia	241.2409	Eneko Sánchez; Spain	240.5016	Viktor Druzin; Kazakhstan	238.5317
Solo free	Zakhar Trofimov; Russia	267.0426	Eneko Sánchez; Spain	264.4163	Viktor Druzin; Kazakhstan	257.1201

=== Mixed ===
Event	Gold		Silver		Bronze	
Duet technical	Russia; Alina Rumiantseva; Zakhar Trofimov	234.1350	Spain; Martina García i Boque; Eneko Sánchez	221.6983	China; Jin Yanxiao; Chen Keyu	217.5259
Duet free	Spain; Arlet Arnan; Eneko Sánchez	263.2992	Kazakhstan; Yasmina Islamova; Aldiyar Ramazanov	248.1058	Japan; Manami Dodo; Heizo Aitaka	246.9850

== Medal table ==
* Host nation (Hungary)

Rank	Nation	Gold	Silver	Bronze	Total
1	Russia	9	0	1	10
2	Spain	2	4	4	10
3	China	0	5	2	7
4	Kazakhstan	0	2	2	4
5	Belarus	0	0	1	1
5	Japan	0	0	1	1
Totals (6 entries)		11	11	11	33
