= Isabelle Blanchet-Rampling =

Canadian synchronized swimmer

Isabelle Rampling
Personal information
- Born: June 24, 1985 (age 41) Toronto, Ontario

Sport
- Sport: Swimming
- Strokes: synchronized swimming
Medal record
Representing Canada
Synchronized swimming
Commonwealth Games
Gold medal – first place	2006 Melbourne	Duet
Pan American Games
Silver medal – second place	2007 Rio	Duet
Silver medal – second place	2007 Rio	Team

Isabelle Rampling (born June 24, 1985) is a Canadian synchronized swimmer.

== Career ==
At the 2006 Commonwealth Games, Rampling won a gold medal, which she followed up with two silver medals at the 2007 Pan American Games. At the 2008 Summer Olympics, she placed sixth with partner Marie-Pier Boudreau Gagnon in the duet.

In 2017, she was selected to compete at the World Championships in the mixed duet event with Robert Prévost. Her name was reported to be Isabelle Blanchet-Rampling (she formerly competed under the name Isabelle Rampling).
