= Artistic swimming at the 2026 European Aquatics Championships – Men's solo free routine =

Men's solo free routine at the 2026 European Aquatics Championships
- Venue: Paris Aquatic Centre
- Dates: 3 August
- Competitors: 7 from 7 nations
- Winning points: 258.9188

Medalists
gold medal	Ranjuo Tomblin	Great Britain
silver medal	Filippo Pelati	Italy
bronze medal	Jordi Cáceres	Spain

The Men's solo free routine competition at the 2026 European Aquatics Championships was held on 3 August 2026.

== Results ==
The final was started at 10:15.

Rank	Swimmer	Nationality	Points
1st place, gold medalist(s)	Ranjuo Tomblin	Great Britain	258.9188
2nd place, silver medalist(s)	Filippo Pelati	Italy	252.8713
3rd place, bronze medalist(s)	Jordi Cáceres	Spain	229.2599
4	Zakhar Trofimov	Neutral Athletes B	201.8313
5	David Martinez Delgado	Sweden	185.0550
6	Jude Bonnici Peresso	Malta	165.4199
7	Dimitar Isaev	Bulgaria	137.9725
