= Becky Kim =

American synchronized swimmer

Personal information
- Full name: Rebakah Kim
- Nationality: USA
- Born: February 28, 1985 (age 41) Redwood City, California, U.S.
- Height: 5 ft 5 in (165 cm)
- Weight: 124 lb (56 kg)

Sport
- Sport: Synchronized swimming
- Club: Walnut Creek Aquanuts
- College team: Ohio State University
- Coach: Gail Emery, T. McGregor (Aquanuts); Tammy McGregor (Olympics); Linda Witter (OSU)
Medal record
Representing United States
World Championships
Bronze medal – third place	2007 Melbourne	Team, free routine
Pan American Games
Gold medal – first place	2007 Rio de Janeiro	Team

Rebekah "Becky" Kim (born February 28, 1985) is an American synchronized swimmer who competed for Ohio State University and participated in the 2008 Beijing Olympics, placing fifth in the team competition.

Kim was born to Korean parents Peter and Jane Kim on February 28, 1985 in Redwood City, California. She began as a gymnast, figure skater and dancer, and did not take up synchronized swim training until at least the age of nine. Beginning at the age of nine, she trained with the Walnut Creek Aquanuts where she was managed and trained initially by Hall of Fame Synchronized Swim Coach Gail Emery and later by Tammy Cleland-McGregor who began as an Assistant Coach. Kim attended and graduated Northgate High School in Walnut Creek, California, where she grew up. She was an active member of the San Francisco Korean Full Gospel Church.

Only a few months prior to the 2008 Olympics, Kim experienced an injury in her elbows caused by a lift that limited her Olympic participation to the team technical event only. She did some of her Olympic training after being selected for the team in South Korea.

== 2008 Beijing Olympics ==
Coached by Tammy Cleland-McGregor in synchronized swimming at the 2008 Summer Olympics in Beijing, China, Kim's U.S. team placed fifth in the team competition with a points score of 95.33. The Russian Federation team, the pre-game favorite, placed first with a score of 99.5, the team from Spain placed second for the silver with score of 98.25, and the home team from the People's Republic of China placed third for the bronze with a score of 98.334.

=== Ohio State University ===
From around 2004-2006, and then in 2009 after the Olympics, Kim competed on a full athletic scholarship in synchronized swimming for Ohio State University, where she was managed and trained by Coach Linda Witter. Witter coached the synchronized swim team at Ohio State from around 1995-2012, had an exceptional record of 671-18 in collegiate meets, and worked as both an Assistant and Head Coach of the U.S. National team. Kim was a college All-American at Ohio State four times, and while at OSU, captured championships in college competition a total of six times that included titles in trio, team and duet. Taking a year off from Ohio State from 2007-8, Kim competed almost exclusively with the U.S. National team, and trained in earnest for the 2008 Olympics. She was a college Athlete of the Year for U.S. Synchronized Swimming in 2009. In both 2004, and 2009, she helped Ohio State to National titles in synchronized swimming in collegiate competition. Kim was a member of National Squad's Team 1 and Team 2. At OSU, she had an interest in studying both communications and nutrition, and later had plans to study nursing.

=== International highlights ===
She won a bronze medal in synchronized swimming at the 2007 World Aquatics Championships in Melbourne in the team free routine, and a gold medal in synchronized swimming at the 2007 Summer Pan American Games in Rio de Janeiro in the group competition. She competed in many more international competitions.

=== Honors ===
Kim was inducted to the Ohio State Hall of Fame in 2014 for her years of achievement on the school's synchronized swimming team.
