= Mikhaela Kalancha =

Russian synchronized swimmer (born 1994)

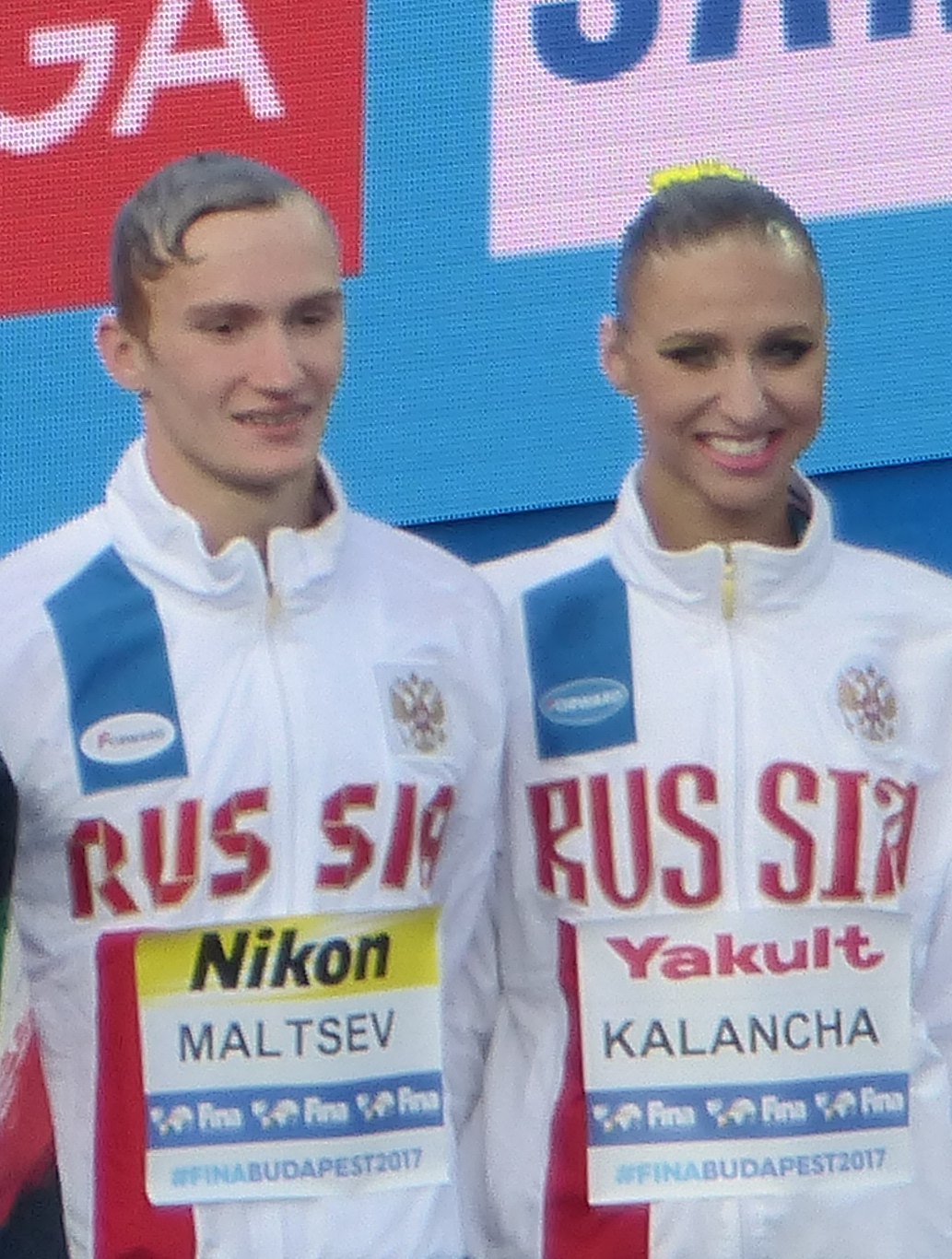

Personal information
- Full name: Mikhaela Olegovna Kalancha
- Nationality: Russian
- Born: 5 July 1994 (age 32) Chișinău, Moldova
- Height: 1.71 m (5 ft 7 in)
- Weight: 50 kg (110 lb)

Sport
- Sport: Swimming
- Strokes: Synchronised swimming
- Club: MGFSO
- College team: Russian State University of Physical Education, Sport, Youth and Tourism
Medal record
Synchronized swimming
Representing Russia
World Championships
Gold medal – first place	2013 Barcelona	Free combination
Gold medal – first place	2015 Kazan	Free combination
Gold medal – first place	2017 Budapest	Mixed duet free
Gold medal – first place	2019 Gwangju	Free routine combination
Silver medal – second place	2017 Budapest	Mixed duet technical
European Championships
Gold medal – first place	2016 London	Mixed free routine
Gold medal – first place	2016 London	Mixed technical routine
Gold medal – first place	2018 Glasgow	Team free routine
Gold medal – first place	2018 Glasgow	Team technical routine

Mikhaela Olegovna Kalancha (Russian: Михаэла Олеговна Каланча, born 5 July 1994) is a Moldovan-born Russian competitor in synchronised swimming.

== Career ==
Kalancha won a gold medal at the 2015 World Aquatics Championships and a gold medal at the 2013 World Aquatics Championships in Team free routine combination.

In 2016, Kalancha began competing in mixed synchronized swimming and partnered with Aleksandr Maltsev at the 2016 European Championships; there they won gold in mixed free and technical routines respectively.

The next year, they took part in the 2017 World Aquatics Championships in Budapest, and won gold and silver respectively in the mixed free and technical routines.
