= Kate Hooven =

American synchronized swimmer

Personal information
- Born: January 3, 1985 (age 41) Newton, Massachusetts, United States

Sport
- Sport: Synchronised swimming
Medal record
Representing United States
World Championships
Bronze medal – third place	2007 Melbourne	Team, free routine
Pan American Games
Gold medal – first place	2007 Rio de Janeiro	Team

Katherine "Kate" Hooven (born January 3, 1985) is an American synchronized swimmer who competed in the 2008 Summer Olympics.
