= Synchronised swimming at the 2016 European Aquatics Championships – Mixed free routine =

Solo free routine at the 2016 European Aquatics Championships
- Dates: 11 May
- Competitors: 10 from 5 nations
- Teams: 5
- Winning points: 90.4667

Medalists
gold medal	Aleksandr Maltsev; Mikhaela Kalancha	Russia
silver medal	Giorgio Minisini; Mariangela Perrupato	Italy
bronze medal	Pau Ribes; Berta Ferreras	Spain

The Mixed free routine competition of the 2016 European Aquatics Championships was held on 11 May 2016.

== Results ==
The final was held at 18:30.

Rank	Swimmers	Nationality	
Rank	Swimmers	Nationality	Points
1st place, gold medalist(s)	Aleksandr Maltsev; Mikhaela Kalancha	Russia	90.4667
2nd place, silver medalist(s)	Giorgio Minisini; Mariangela Perrupato	Italy	87.4667
3rd place, bronze medalist(s)	Pau Ribes; Berta Ferreras	Spain	86.5667
4	Chloé Kautzmann; Benoît Beaufils	France	85.2667
5	Kateryna Reznik; Anton Timofeyev	Ukraine	83.8667
