= Synchronised swimming at the 2016 European Aquatics Championships – Mixed technical routine =

Mixed technical routine at the 2016 European Aquatics Championships
- Dates: 13 May
- Competitors: 8 from 4 nations
- Teams: 4
- Winning points: 89.0902

Medalists
gold medal	Aleksandr Maltsev; Mikhaela Kalancha	Russia
silver medal	Manila Flamini; Giorgio Minisini	Italy
bronze medal	Pau Ribes; Berta Ferreras	Spain

The Mixed technical routine competition of the 2016 European Aquatics Championships was held on 13 May 2016.

== Results ==
The final was held at 08:30.

Rank	Swimmers	Nationality	
Rank	Swimmers	Nationality	Points
1st place, gold medalist(s)	Aleksandr Maltsev; Mikhaela Kalancha	Russia	89.0902
2nd place, silver medalist(s)	Manila Flamini; Giorgio Minisini	Italy	86.1772
3rd place, bronze medalist(s)	Pau Ribes; Berta Ferreras	Spain	82.0645
4	Kateryna Reznik; Anton Timofeyev	Ukraine	80.4905
