= Lagosanto =

- Comune
- Comune di Lagosanto
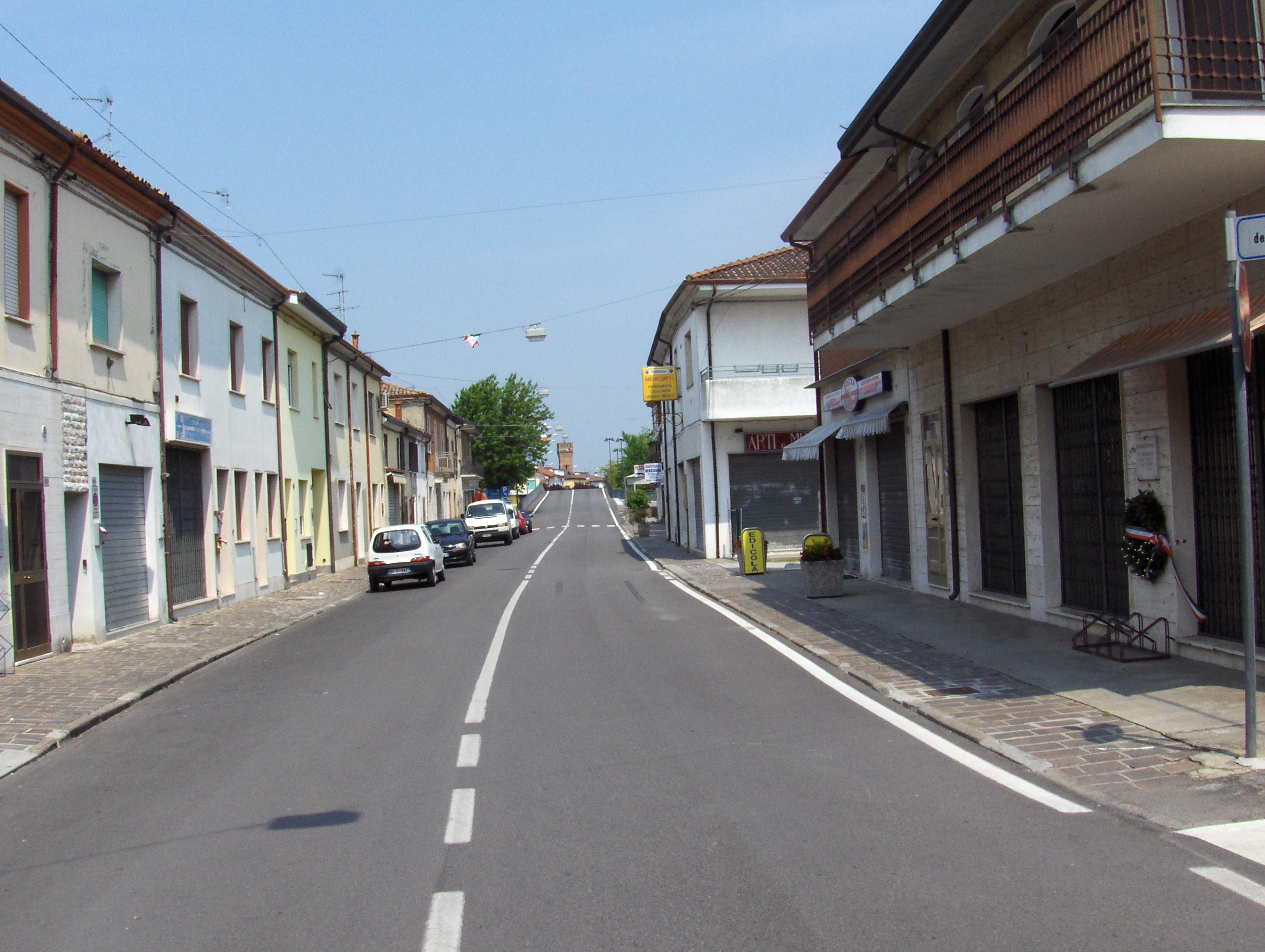
- View of Lagosanto

- Flag Coat of arms

- Location within Italy Location within Emilia-Romagna
- Coordinates: 44°46′N 12°8′E
- Country: Italy
- Region: Emilia-Romagna
- Province: Ferrara (FE)

Government
  - Mayor: Cristian Bertarelli

Area
  - Total: 34.44 km^{2} (13.30 sq mi)
- Elevation: 2 m (6.6 ft)

Population (31 August 2017)
  - Total: 4,864
  - Density: 141.2/km^{2} (365.8/sq mi)
- Demonym: Laghesi
- Time zone: UTC+1 (CET)
  - Summer (DST): UTC+2 (CEST)
- Postal code: 44023
- Dialing code: 0533
- Website: Official website

Lagosanto is a municipality in the province of Ferrara, Emilia-Romagna region, Italy, with a population of approximately 4,800 (2018). The town center includes the town hall, restaurants, shops, bars, and residential areas.

The Mayor is the right-wing politician Cristian Bertarelli.

Most residents live in rural areas outside the town, such as Marozzo, which features a water pumping station dating back to the 1870s. This station, called an idrovoro, was built to drain marshlands and make the land suitable for agriculture. The original steam-powered facility is now a small museum with exhibitions about land drainage and changes to the local landscape.

A modern pumping station, constructed in 1986, is located nearby and replaced the old one.

== People ==
- Fulvio Mingozzi (1925-2000), actor
