= Lucrezia Ruggiero =

Italian artistic swimmer (born 2000)

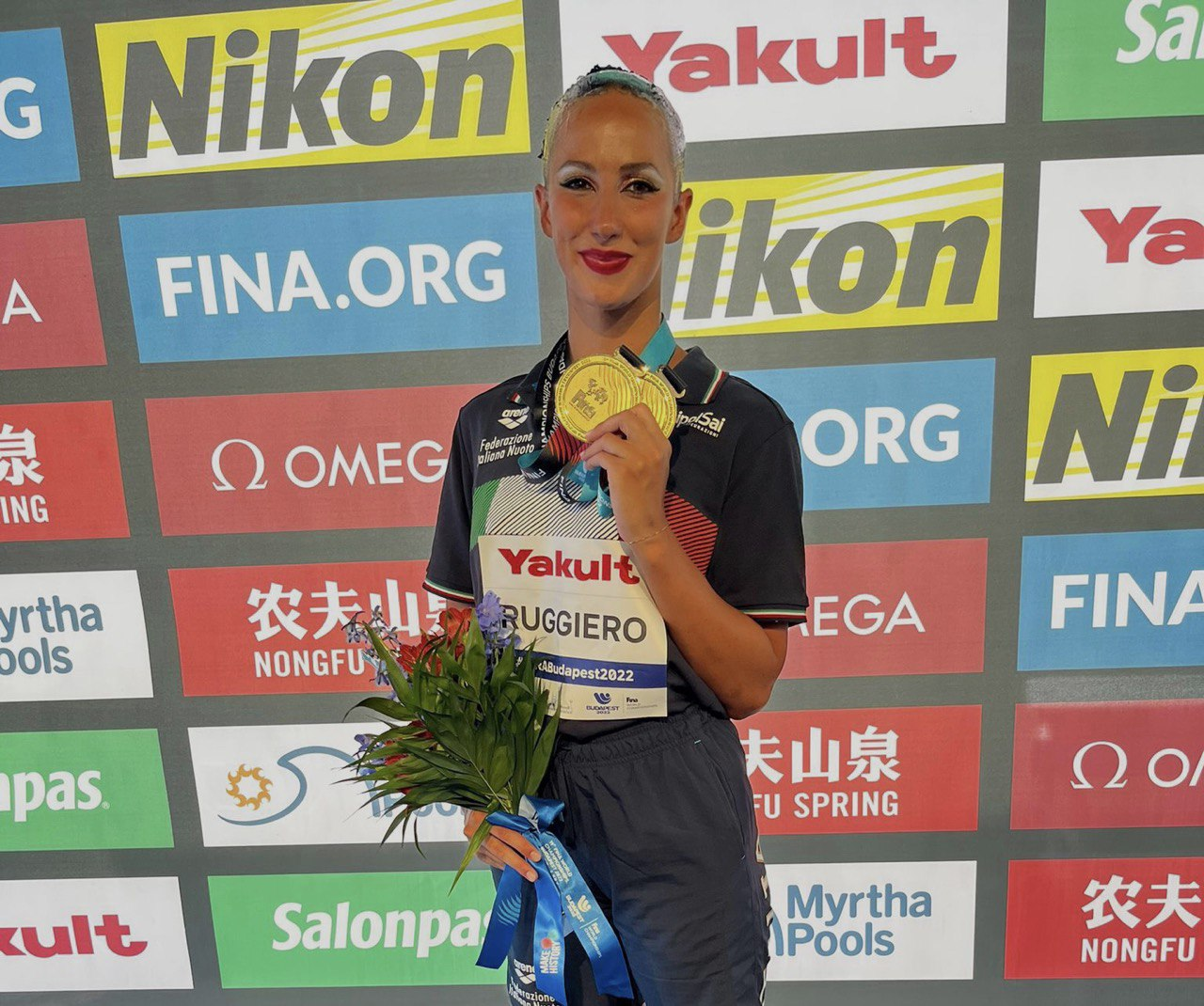

Personal information
- Nationality: Italian
- Born: 7 June 2000 (age 26) Rome, Italy

Sport
- Country: Italy
- Sport: Artistic swimming
- Club: Gruppo Sportivo Fiamme Oro
- Partner: Giorgio Minisini
Medal record
Women's artistic swimming
Representing Italy
Event	1st	2nd	3rd
World Championships	2	3	1
European Championships	3	1	1
European Games	1	3	1
Artistic Swimming World Series	0	1	0
Artistic Swimming World Cup	1	0	0
Total	7	8	3
World Championships
Gold medal – first place	2022 Budapest	Mixed duet free routine
Gold medal – first place	2022 Budapest	Mixed duet technical routine
Silver medal – second place	2023 Fukuoka	Duet technical routine
Silver medal – second place	2023 Fukuoka	Team technical routine
Silver medal – second place	2025 Singapore	Duet free routine
Bronze medal – third place	2025 Singapore	Mixed duet technical routine
European Games
Gold medal – first place	2023 Kraków-Małopolska	Mixed duet technical routine
Silver medal – second place	2023 Kraków-Małopolska	Team free routine
Silver medal – second place	2023 Kraków-Małopolska	Mixed duet free routine
Silver medal – second place	2023 Kraków-Małopolska	Team technical routine
Bronze medal – third place	2023 Kraków-Małopolska	Team acrobatic routine
European Championships
Gold medal – first place	2025 Funchal	Duet free routine
Gold medal – first place	2022 Rome	Mixed duet free routine
Gold medal – first place	2022 Rome	Mixed duet technical routine
Silver medal – second place	2025 Funchal	Mixed duet free routine
Silver medal – second place	2026 Paris	Mixed duet technical routine
Bronze medal – third place	2025 Funchal	Mixed duet technical routine
Bronze medal – third place	2026 Paris	Mixed duet free routine

Lucrezia Ruggiero (born 7 June 2000) is an Italian artistic swimmer. She won one gold medal each at the 2022 World Aquatics Championships in the mixed duet technical routine and the mixed duet free routine. At the 2022 European Aquatics Championships, she won gold medals in the mixed duet technical routine and the mixed duet free routine.

== Background ==
Ruggiero was born 7 June 2000 in Rome, Italy, where she trains and competes for sports club Gruppo Sportivo Fiamme Oro. She has been training with her professional artistic swimming partner for mixed duet events, Giorgio Minisini, since 2019.

== Career ==
=== 2021 Artistic Swimming World Series ===
At the 2021 FINA Artistic Swimming World Series leg held in June in Barcelona, Spain, Ruggiero and her partner Giorgio Minisini won the silver medal in the mixed duet free routine with a score of 88.6332 points. For their performance, the duo chose to choreograph their routine to the song "Stairway to Heaven" by Led Zeppelin.

=== 2022 World Aquatics Championships ===
2022 World Championships
Gold medal – first place	mixed duet technical routine	89.2685
Gold medal – first place	mixed duet free routine	90.9667

On the second day of artistic swimming at the 2022 World Aquatics Championships, contested in June in Budapest, Hungary, Ruggiero and her partner Giorgio Minisini scored 88.5734 points in the preliminaries of the mixed duet technical routine to qualify for the final ranking first. Day four, 20 June, the duo won the gold medal with a score of 89.2685 points, finishing 2.6746 points ahead of silver medalists Tomoka Sato and Yotaro Sato of Japan and 2.8260 points ahead of bronze medalists Shi Haoyu and Zhang Yiyao of China. Four days later, in the preliminaries of the mixed duet free routine, she and Minisini advanced to the final with a score of 90.5000 points. The following day, 25 June, they won the gold medal with a score of 90.9667 points and choreography to music by Italian band Måneskin in the theme of "Risorgimento".

=== 2022 European Aquatics Championships ===
For her first of two events at the 2022 European Aquatics Championships, held in Rome in August, Ruggiero and her partner Giorgio Minisini won the gold medal in the mixed duet free routine with a score of 89.7333 points, placing over four points ahead of silver medalists Pau Ribes and Emma García of Spain. In her second event, she and Giorgio Minisini won the gold medal in the mixed duet technical routine, this time outscoring the Spaniards Pau Ribes and Emma García by over five points with a final mark of 89.3679 points.

=== 2023 Artistic Swimming World Cup ===
For the stop of the 2023 Artistic Swimming World Cup held in March in Markham, Canada, Ruggiero and her partner Linda Cerruti won the gold medal in the women's duet free routine with a final mark of 321.2667 points, outscoring the silver medalists from Ukraine by over 25 points and the bronze medalists from Israel by over 35 points.

== International championships ==
Meet	mixed duet technical routine	mixed duet free routine
WC 2022	(gold) (89.2685)	(gold) (90.9667)
EC 2022	(gold) (89.3679)	(gold) (89.7333)

== See also ==
- Italy at the 2022 World Aquatics Championships
