= Annabelle Orme =

American synchronized swimmer (born 1987)

Personal information
- Born: March 9, 1987 (age 39) New York City, United States

Sport
- Sport: Synchronised swimming
Medal record
Representing United States
World Championships
Bronze medal – third place	2007 Melbourne	Team, free routine
Pan American Games
Gold medal – first place	2007 Rio de Janeiro	Team

Annabelle Orme (born 9 March 1987) is an American synchronized swimmer who competed in the 2008 Summer Olympics.
