= 2006 FINA World Junior Synchronised Swimming Championships =

International synchronised swimming competition

The 10th FINA World Junior Synchronised Swimming Championships was held 2006 in Foshan, China. The synchronised swimmers are aged between 15 and 18 years old, swimming in four events: Solo, Duet, Team and Free combination.

== Results ==
Event	Gold		Silver		Bronze	
Solo details	Huang Xuechen; China	84.441	Aleksandra Elchinova; Russia	84.038	Yukiko Inui; Japan	83.624
Duet details	Antonina Volkova; Sofia Volkova; Russia	94.100	Ona Carbonell; Violan Cristina; Spain	92.900	He Dandan; Han Ying; China	92.400
Team details	Russia	85.780	China	84.183	Japan	83.252
Free combination details	Russia	94.600	China	93.500	Japan	92.600
