= Andrea Nott =

American synchronized swimmer (born 1982)

Personal information
- Born: April 15, 1982 (age 44) San Jose, California, United States
- Height: 5 ft 8 in (1.73 m)
- Weight: 130 lb (59 kg)

Sport
- Country: United States
- Sport: Synchronised swimming
Medal record
Representing United States
World Championships
Bronze medal – third place	2007 Melbourne	Team, free routine
Pan American Games
Gold medal – first place	2007 Rio de Janeiro	Duet
Gold medal – first place	2007 Rio de Janeiro	Team

Andrea Michelle Nott (born April 15, 1982) is an American competitor in synchronised swimming. She swam with Christina Jones in the duet event and team event at the 2008 Summer Olympics in Beijing, placing fifth in both. She has double gold medals in the team and duet events from the Pan American Games in 2007 held in Rio de Janeiro, Brazil. Inducted into US Artistic Swimming Hall of Fame in 2023.
