= Ivan Martinović (swimmer) =

Serbian artistic swimmer (born 2001)

Personal information
- Born: 26 March 2001 (age 25) Serbia, FR Yugoslavia

Sport
- Country: Serbia
- Sport: Artistic swimming
- Event(s): Solo technical routine, Solo free routine, Mixed duet technical routine
Medal record
Men's artistic swimming
Representing Serbia
Event	1st	2nd	3rd
European Championships	0	0	1
Total	0	0	1
European Championships
Bronze medal – third place	2022 Rome	Solo technical routine

Ivan Martinović (born 26 March 2001) is a Serbian artistic swimmer. In 2022, he became the first man to win a bronze medal in a solo male artistic swimming event at a LEN European Aquatics Championships, winning the bronze medal in the solo technical routine at the 2022 European Aquatics Championships.

== Background ==
Martinović was born 26 March 2001 and is a student at the University of Belgrade.

== Career ==
=== 2022 European Aquatics Championships ===
At the 2022 European Aquatics Championships, held in August in Rome, Italy, solo male artistic swimming events were included in the program for the first time. On the second day of competition, 12 August, Martinović scored 58.8834 points in the final of the first solo male event, the solo technical routine, and won the bronze medal, which made him the first male artistic swimmer to win a bronze medal in a solo event at a LEN European Aquatics Championships. He shared the podium with first gold medalist Giorgio Minisini of Italy and first silver medalist Fernando Díaz del Río of Spain. Two days later, in the final of the solo free routine, he scored 68.5333 points, placing fourth within 10 points of bronze medalist Quentin Rakotomalala of France. With his fourth-place finish, he became the first man to compete in the solo free routine at a LEN European Aquatics Championships, place, and not earn a medal. In his third and final event, the mixed duet technical routine the following day, he and partner Jelena Kontić placed fifth with a score of 68.1061 points, which was 7.4853 points behind the duo of Jozef Solymosy and Silvia Solymosyová from Slovakia who won the bronze medal and 21.2618 points behind Giorgio Minisini and Lucrezia Ruggiero of Italy who won the gold medal.

== International championships ==
Meet	solo technical routine	solo free routine	mixed duet technical routine
EC 2022	(bronze) (58.8834)	4th (68.5333)	5th (68.1061)
