= Kristina Lum =

American synchronized swimmer

Personal information
- Full name: Kristina Michelle Lum
- Born: October 18, 1976 (age 49) Santa Clara, California, US
- Height: 1.55 m (5 ft 1 in)
- Weight: 47 kg (104 lb)

Sport
- Sport: Swimming
- Strokes: Synchronized swimming
- Club: Santa Clara Aquamaids
Medal record
Women's synchronized swimming
Representing United States
World Championships
Bronze medal – third place	1998 Perth	Team
Silver medal – second place	2015 Kazan	Mixed duet free routine
- Updated on 30 July 2015

Kristina Lum (born October 18, 1976) is an American synchronized swimmer.

Teaming with partner Bill May, Lum won the duet event at the 1998 US national championships. The pair then won a silver medal in the same event at the 1998 Goodwill Games.

Kristina went on to compete in the women's team event at the 2000 Summer Olympics, finishing in fifth place. In 2012, she was inducted into the United States Synchronized Swimming Hall of Fame.
