= 1991 FINA World Junior Synchronised Swimming Championships =

International synchronised swimming competition

The 2nd FINA World Junior Synchronised Swimming Championships was held July 25-28, 1991 in Salerno, Italy. The synchronised swimmers are aged between 15 and 18 years old, swimming in three events: Solo, Duet and Team.

== Participating nations ==
- Austria
- Canada
- Egypt
- France
- Great Britain (United Kingdom)
- Italy
- Japan
- Soviet Union
- Switzerland
- United States

== Results ==
Event	Gold		Silver		Bronze	
Solo details	Miya Tachibana; Japan	161.14	Laila Vakil (United Kingdom) Great Britain	159.09	Janice Bremner; Canada	158.59
Duet details	Miya Tachibana; Rei Jimbo; Japan	160.54	Natalie Gruzdeva; Julie Beloglazova; Soviet Union	158.24	Laurie McClelland; Jenny Ohanesian (United States) USA	156.47
Team details	Japan	160.17	(United States) USA	158.69	Soviet Union	157.16
