= Ranjuo Tomblin =

British synchronised swimmer (born 2005)

Personal information
- Nationality: British
- Born: 25 September 2005 (age 20)

Sport
- Country: Great Britain
- Sport: Synchronised swimming
Medal record
Men's artistic swimming
Representing Great Britain
Event	1st	2nd	3rd
World Championships	0	0	1
European Championships	6	2	4
European Games	0	0	2
Total	6	2	7
World Championships
Bronze medal – third place	2025 Singapore	Mixed duet free
European Championships
Gold medal – first place	2024 Belgrade	Solo free
Gold medal – first place	2025 Funchal	Solo technical
Gold medal – first place	2026 Paris	Solo free
Gold medal – first place	2026 Paris	Solo technical
Gold medal – first place	2026 Paris	Mixed duet free
Gold medal – first place	2026 Paris	Mixed duet technical
Silver medal – second place	2024 Belgrade	Solo technical
Silver medal – second place	2025 Funchal	Mixed duet technical
Bronze medal – third place	2024 Belgrade	Mixed duet free
Bronze medal – third place	2024 Belgrade	Mixed duet technical
Bronze medal – third place	2025 Funchal	Solo free
Bronze medal – third place	2025 Funchal	Mixed duet free
European Games
Bronze medal – third place	2023 Kraków-Małopolska	Mixed duet free
Bronze medal – third place	2023 Kraków-Małopolska	Mixed duet technical

Ranjuo Tomblin (born 25 September 2005) is a British synchronised swimmer.

== Career ==
Tomblin began artistic swimming in 2017, and became the first male artistic swimmer to represent Great Britain internationally at the 2021 European Junior Championships.

Tomblin competed at the 2024 European Aquatics Championships and won a gold medal in the solo free routine with a score of 191.0293. He became the first British man to win a European Championships title in artistic swimming. In June 2025, he competed at the 2025 European Artistic Swimming Championships and won a gold medal in the solo technical free routine and a bronze medal in the solo free routine.

In August 2026, he competed at the 2026 European Aquatics Championships and won gold medals in the solo free and solo technical routines. He also won gold medals in the mixed duet free and mixed duet technical routines, along with his partner Isabelle Thorpe. This was Great Britain's first-ever mixed duet free European title. Their score of 258.2383 denied Spain a fourth consecutive title in the event by 0.2650 points. This marked the end of their partnership as both athletes are shifting their focus toward individual qualification paths and events for the 2028 Summer Olympics. The 2028 Games will be the first time that men can compete in artistic swimming, with a maximum of two males allowed per squad of eight in the team event.
