= 2008 FINA Synchronised Swimming World Trophy =

The 3rd FINA Synchronised Swimming World Trophy was held December 5–7, 2008 in Madrid, Spain. It featured swimmers from 8 nations, swimming in four events: Duet Free, Duet Thematic, Team Free and Free Combination.

== Participating nations ==
8 nations swam at the 2008 Synchro World Trophy:

- Canada
- China
- Egypt
- Italy
- Japan
- Russia
- Spain
- USA

== Results ==
Event	Gold		Silver		Bronze	
Duet free details	Gemma Mengual; Andrea Fuentes; Spain	99.000	Jiang Wenwen; Jiang Tingting; China	97.000	Angelika Timanina; Daria Korobova; Russia	96.667
Duet thematic details	Gemma Mengual; Andrea Fuentes; Spain	99.000	Jiang Wenwen; Jiang Tingting; China	97.000	Saya Kimura; Maya Timura; Japan	96.000
Team free details	Spain	99.666	China	98.000	Russia	97.000
Free combination details	Spain	99.000	China	98.666	Russia	97.334

== Final standings ==
Place	Nation	Total
1	Spain	396.666
2	China	390.666
3	Russia	386.001
