= Charlotte Fabre =

French synchronized swimmer

Personal information
- Born: 29 July 1981 (age 45) Nice, France
- Height: 174 cm (5 ft 9 in)
- Weight: 62 kg (137 lb)

Sport
- Sport: Swimming

Charlotte Fabre (born 29 July 1981) is a French former synchronized swimmer who competed in the 2000 Summer Olympics.
