= Bill May (synchronized swimmer) =

American synchronized swimmer (born 1979)

Personal information
- Full name: William May
- Born: January 17, 1979 (age 47) Syracuse, New York, U.S.
- Height: 5 ft 9 in (175 cm)

Sport
- Country: United States
- Sport: Synchronized swimming
Medal record
World Championships
Gold medal – first place	2015 Kazan	Mixed duet technical routine
Silver medal – second place	2015 Kazan	Mixed duet free routine
Silver medal – second place	2023 Fukuoka	Team acrobatic routine
Bronze medal – third place	2017 Budapest	Mixed duet technical routine
Bronze medal – third place	2017 Budapest	Mixed duet free
Bronze medal – third place	2024 Doha	Team acrobatic routine
Goodwill Games
Silver medal – second place	1998 New York	Duet

William May (born January 17, 1979) is an American synchronized swimmer. Performing primarily in duets, May won several national and international events. May desired to compete at the 2004 Summer Olympics, but then there was not yet a mixed or male category in Synchronized Swimming.

== Early career ==
May was born in Syracuse, New York. He became interested in synchronized swimming when he was 10 years old while living in Syracuse, after watching his sister in a beginning class. He explained why he became involved, "I did competitive swimming there and the synchro class was right after it, so we couldn't go home until she was done. It was either try it with her or sit outside the pool and watch her, so my mom told me to try it, just to be in the water and be doing something."

May began taking lessons and later performed with a local team, the Syracuse Synchro Cats. After the Synchro Cats disbanded, he performed with the Oswego Lakettes.

In 1996, at age 16, May moved to Santa Clara, California. He tried out for the Santa Clara Aquamaids, one of the top synchronized swimming programs in the United States, and was accepted into the junior A squad. May eventually was promoted to the Aquamaid's top "A" squad.

== Competition ==
Teaming with partner Kristina Lum, May won the duet event at the 1998 US national championships. The pair then won the silver medal in the event at the 1998 Goodwill Games. May desired to compete in the Pan American games but there was not yet a male or mixed category in Synchronized Swimming 1999 Pan American Games.

The International Swimming Federation (FINA) allowed May to compete in its sanctioned events. In 1999, May finished first in duet at the Swiss Open and French Open. He won the Grand Slam at the 2000 Jantzen Nationals and was named the US Synchronized Swimming Athlete of the Year in 1998 and 1999.

May was not allowed to compete at the 2004 Summer Olympics because Synchronized swimming at the Summer Olympics consisted of two women's only events.

== Later career ==
In 2008, May performed in Cirque du Soleil's water-based show, O. He was paid $100 for each performance. In addition, he later showed Natalie Fletcher, an up-and-coming synchronized swimmer who would go on to win 13-15 nationals, around the set of Cirque du Soleil, an excursion organized by Tammy McGregor, former Olympian.

== Comeback to the sport ==
With the mixed duet added to the World Championship program, Bill May returned to the sport after a 10-year retirement. On July 26, 2015, he became the first man ever to win Synchronized swimming gold at a major event, such as an Olympic or World Championships, by winning the mixed duet technical routine gold, with his partner Christina Jones at the World Aquatic Championships in Kazan, Russia. Aleksandr Maltsev from Russia would become the second man by defeating May and his partner Kristina Lum with his partner Darina Valitova in the mixed duet free routine on July 30, 2015. May and Lum would finish second and win the silver. Maltsev and Valitova had been a close second to May and Jones in the technical routine event. Lum had been May's duet partner in 1998, where they also made in winning the duet at the U.S. Synchronized Swimming Championships, and a silver at the 1998 Goodwill Games.

In July 2023, at age 44, May became the first American man to win a world team medal, joining the U.S. team that claimed silver in the acrobatic routine. It was the first U.S. medal in artistic swimming since 2007. This is the first year that men were permitted to compete in artistic team events at the World Championships, taking place in Fukuoka, Japan. Men will also be able to compete at the Olympics in a team event for the first time at the 2024 Paris games. However, he missed the cut for the 2024 USA Olympic team.

On August 6th 2024 he was honoured to open the Artistic swimming team competition (free routine) at the Summer Olympics in Paris.
