= 1993 FINA World Junior Synchronised Swimming Championships =

International synchronised swimming competition

The 3rd FINA World Junior Synchronised Swimming Championships was held August 27–30, 1993 in Leeds, Great Britain. The synchronised swimmers are aged between 15 and 18 years old, swimming in three events: Solo, Duet and Team.

== Participating nations ==
- Australia
- Austria
- Belarus
- Brazil
- Bulgaria
- Canada
- China
- Czech Republic
- Egypt
- France
- Germany
- Great Britain (United Kingdom)
- Hungary
- Italy
- Japan
- Kazakhstan
- Mexico
- Netherlands
- New Zealand
- Poland
- Russia
- Slovakia
- South Africa
- Spain
- Sweden
- Switzerland
- Ukraine
- United States

== Results ==
Event	Gold		Silver		Bronze	
Solo details	Olga Brusnikina; Russia	174.60	Kasia Kulesza; Canada	173.66	Miho Takeda; Japan	172.45
Duet details	Olga Brusnikina; Yulia Pankratova; Russia	173.11	Kasia Kulesza; Marie-Miche Cloutier; Canada	173.02	Miho Takeda; Akiko Miyazaki; Japan	171.36
Team details	Canada	173.49	Japan	171.51	Russia	169.95
