= Danielle Kettlewell =

Australian synchronised swimmer

Danielle Reedy (née Kettlewell)
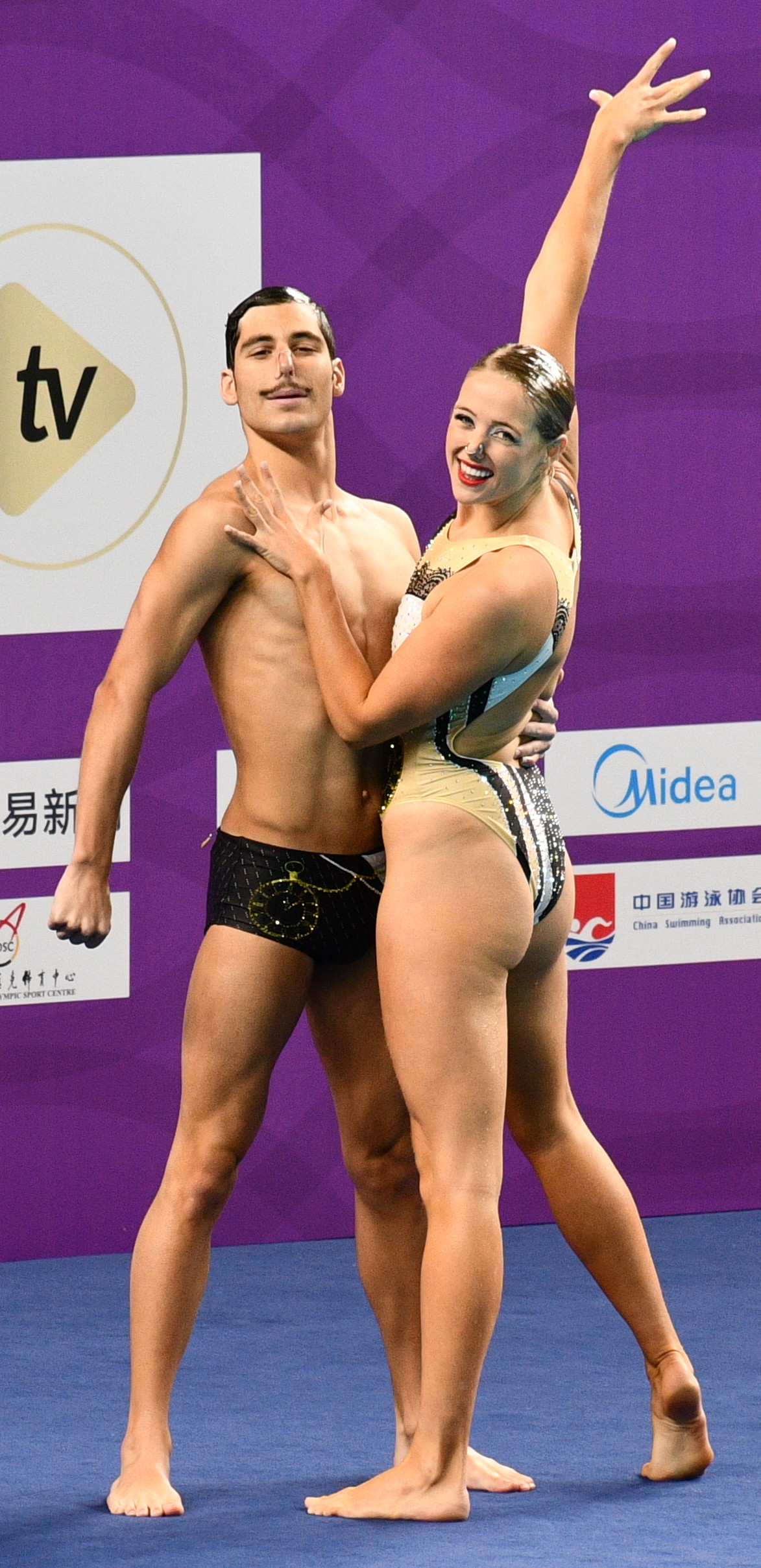
- Danielle Kettlewell and her Mixed Duet partner Ethan Calleja at the 2019 FINA World Series - China Open

Personal information
- Full name: Danielle Merlyn Kettlewell
- Born: 17 November 1992 (age 33) Vancouver, British Columbia, Canada

Sport
- Sport: Swimming
- Strokes: Synchronised swimming

Danielle Merlyn Reedy (née Kettlewell) (born 17 November 1992) is an Australian synchronised swimmer. She competed in the team event at the 2016 Summer Olympics.

She was training for the 2019 FINA World Aquatic Championships of which both her male counterpart, Ethan Calleja and herself have been selected as Australia's first Mixed Duet in the sport of Artistic swimming, formally known as Synchronised Swimming.

Kettlewell and her duet partner Calleja, became National champions in their mixed duet event, showcasing a free duet in Sydney at the 2019 Hancock Prospecting Artistic Swimming Australian National Championships. They also have recently competed at the 2019 FINA World Series - China Open in May, which was held at the Yung Ting Natatorium (Beijing). Kettlewell and Calleja placed 5th in the Free Mixed Duet event, securing the position of the first two Australians to compete in this event internationally.
