= He Xiaochu =

Chinese synchronized swimmer

Personal information
- Born: April 4, 1984 (age 42) Chengdu, Sichuan, China

Sport
- Sport: Synchronised swimming

He Xiaochu (Chinese: 贺晓初, born 4 April 1984) is a female Chinese synchronized swimmer who competed in the 2004 Summer Olympics.
