= 2001 FINA World Junior Synchronized Swimming Championships =

International synchronized swimming competition

The 7th FINA World Junior Synchronized Swimming Championships was held August 15–19, 2001 at the King County Aquatic Center in Federal Way, United States. The synchronised swimmers are aged between 15 and 18 years old, from 28 nations, swimming in three events: Solo, Duet and Team.

== Participating nations ==
28 nations swam at the 2001 World Junior Championships were:

- Australia
- Brazil
- Canada
- Chile
- China
- Colombia
- Dominican Republic
- Egypt
- France
- Germany
- Great Britain
- Greece
- Israel
- Italy
- Japan
- Kazakhstan
- Korea
- Mexico
- Netherlands
- Puerto Rico
- Russia
- Slovakia
- South Africa
- Spain
- Switzerland
- Ukraine
- USA
- Yugoslavia

== Results ==
Event	Gold		Silver		Bronze	
Solo details	Anastasia Davydova; Russia	91.76	Anouk Renière-Lafrenière; Canada	89.56	Tomomi Kago; Japan	89.32
Duet details	Anastasia Ermakova; Anastasia Davydova; Russia	92.69	Tomomi Kago; Masako Tachivana; Japan	90.06	Tina Fuentes; Andrea Fuentes; Spain	89.73
Team details	Russia	91.25	Japan	89.45	China	89.28
