= Atsushi Abe (synchronized swimmer) =

Japanese synchronised swimmer

Personal information
- Nationality: Japanese
- Born: 30 August 1982 (age 43)

Sport
- Country: Japan
- Sport: Synchronised swimming
Medal record
World Championships
Bronze medal – third place	2019 Gwangju	Mixed duet technical
Bronze medal – third place	2019 Gwangju	Mixed duet free

Atsushi Abe (安部 篤史, Abe Atsushi; born 30 August 1982) is a Japanese synchronised swimmer.

He participated at the 2019 World Aquatics Championships, winning a medal.
