= Artistic swimming at the 2022 European Aquatics Championships – Men's solo technical routine =

Men's solo technical routine at the 2022 European Aquatics Championships
- Venue: Foro Italico
- Dates: 12 August
- Competitors: 3 from 3 nations
- Winning points: 85.7033

Medalists
gold medal	Giorgio Minisini	Italy
silver medal	Fernando Díaz del Río	Spain
bronze medal	Ivan Martinović	Serbia

The Men's solo technical routine competition of the 2022 European Aquatics Championships was held on 12 August 2022.

It marked the first time male artistic swimmers competed in a solo event at a LEN European Aquatics Championships.

== Results ==
The final was held on 12 August at 16:30.

Rank	Swimmers	Nationality	Points
1st place, gold medalist(s)	Giorgio Minisini	Italy	85.7033
2nd place, silver medalist(s)	Fernando Díaz del Río	Spain	79.4951
3rd place, bronze medalist(s)	Ivan Martinović	Serbia	58.8834
