= Jozef Solymosy =

Slovak artistic swimmer

Personal information
- Nationality: Slovak
- Born: 23 July 2005 (age 20) Bratislava, Slovakia

Sport
- Country: Slovakia
- Sport: Artistic swimming
- Event(s): Mixed duet technical routine, Mixed duet free routine,
- Club: TJ Slávia STU Bratislava
- Coached by: Ivana Solymosyová
Medal record
Men's artistic swimming
Representing Slovakia
Event	1st	2nd	3rd
European Championships	0	0	2
Total	0	0	2
European Championships
Bronze medal – third place	2022 Rome	Mixed duet free routine
Bronze medal – third place	2022 Rome	Mixed duet technical routine

Jozef Solymosy (born 23 July 2005) is a Slovak artistic swimmer. In 2022, he won an historic, first-time medal for Slovakia in artistic swimming event at a LEN European Aquatics Championships, with his older sister Silvia Solymosyová winning the bronze medal in the mixed duet free routine at the 2022 European Aquatics Championships, as well as a bronze medal in the mixed duet technical routine.

== Background ==
Solymosy was born 23 July 2005 in Bratislava. He has one older sister Silvia and one younger brother Ivan.

== Career ==
=== 2019 World Youth Artistic Swimming Championships ===
Competing at the 2019 World Youth Artistic Swimming Championships, held in Šamorín, Slovakia Solymosy placed third in the solo figures with a score of 70.3333 points. He also placed fifth in the mixed duet event with a score of 141.2158 points.

=== 2021 European Championships ===
At the 2021 European Championships held in Budapest, Hungary, Solymosy placed fourth twice (mixed duets).

=== 2022 World Aquatics Championships ===
At the 2022 World Aquatics Championships again in Budapest, Hungary, Solymosy placed ninth in the free mixed duet and tenth in the technical mixed duet.

=== 2022 European Championships ===
In the mixed duet free routine at the 2022 European Aquatics Championships, he won the bronze medal with his partner Silvia Solymosyová with a score of 77.0333 points. He also won a bronze medal in the mixed duet technical routine with a score of 75.5914 points.

== International championships ==
Meet	men figures	mixed duet technical routine	mixed duet free routine	mixed duet
WYC 2019	(bronze) (70.3333)			5th (141.2158)
EC 2021		4th (73.3682)	4th (76.1667)	
WC 2022		10th (73.2881)	9th (75.1000)	
EC 2022		(bronze) (75.5914)	(bronze) (77.0333)	

== See also ==
Slovakia at the 2022 World Aquatics Championships
