= Silvia Solymosyová =

Slovak artistic swimmer

Personal information
- Nationality: Slovak
- Born: 10 June 2003 (age 23) Bratislava, Slovakia

Sport
- Country: Slovakia
- Sport: Artistic swimming
- Events: Mixed duet technical routine, Mixed duet free routine,
- Club: TJ Slávia STU Bratislava
- Coached by: Ivana Solymosyová
Medal record
Women's artistic swimming
Representing Slovakia
Event	1st	2nd	3rd
European Championships	0	0	2
Total	0	0	2
European Championships
Bronze medal – third place	2022 Rome	Mixed duet free routine
Bronze medal – third place	2022 Rome	Mixed duet technical routine

Silvia Solymosyová (born 10 June 2003) is a Slovak artistic swimmer, underwater performer, and social media content creator. In 2022, the Solymosy siblings won an historic, first-time medal for Slovakia in artistic swimming event at a LEN European Aquatics Championships, winning the bronze medal in the mixed duet free routine at the 2022 European Aquatics Championships.

== Background ==
Solymosyová was born 10 June 2003 in Bratislava. She has two younger brothers Jozef and Ivan. She gained popularity for her TikTok videos of her underwater dancing and walking. Solymosyová appeared in the documentary "Silvia Solymosyová: The art of walking under water | Her Game" by Olympic Channel.

== Artistic Swimming ==
At the 2018 FINA World Junior Artistic Swimming Championships in Budapest, Hungary, Solymosyová placed 12th in the Women Team Free Combination. At the 2019 FINA World Championships in Gwangju, Korea, Solymosyova acted as a reserve for the Free Combination. At the 2021 European Championships held in Budapest, Hungary, Solymosyová placed fourth twice (mixed duets).

At the 2022 World Aquatics Championships again in Budapest, Hungary, Solymosyová placed ninth in the free mixed duet and tenth in the technical mixed duet. In the mixed duet free routine at the 2022 European Aquatics Championships, she won the bronze medal with her partner Jozef Solymosy with a score of 77.0333 points. She also won a bronze medal in the mixed duet technical routine with a score of 75.5914 points.

== International championships ==
Meet	mixed duet technical routine	mixed duet free routine
EC 2021	4th (73.3682)	4th (76.1667)
WC 2022	10th (73.2881)	9th (75.1000)
EC 2022	(bronze) (75.5914)	(bronze) (77.0333)

== Social Media and content creation ==
Solymosyová began creating short-form video content on TikTok in December 2019, becoming the first swimmer to reach 1 million followers on TikTok. She is also a YouTuber. Her YouTube channel has over 788,000 subscribers and 1.19 billion views as of October 2026.

== Other work ==
In August 2023, Solymosyová appeared as an underwater performer in the official music video for the song "Plážová" by Slovak band Polemic.

== Awards ==
- 2020 SWAMMY AWARDS VIRAL VIDEO OF THE YEAR

== See also ==
Slovakia at the 2022 World Aquatics Championships
