= Giorgio Minisini =

Italian synchronized swimmer

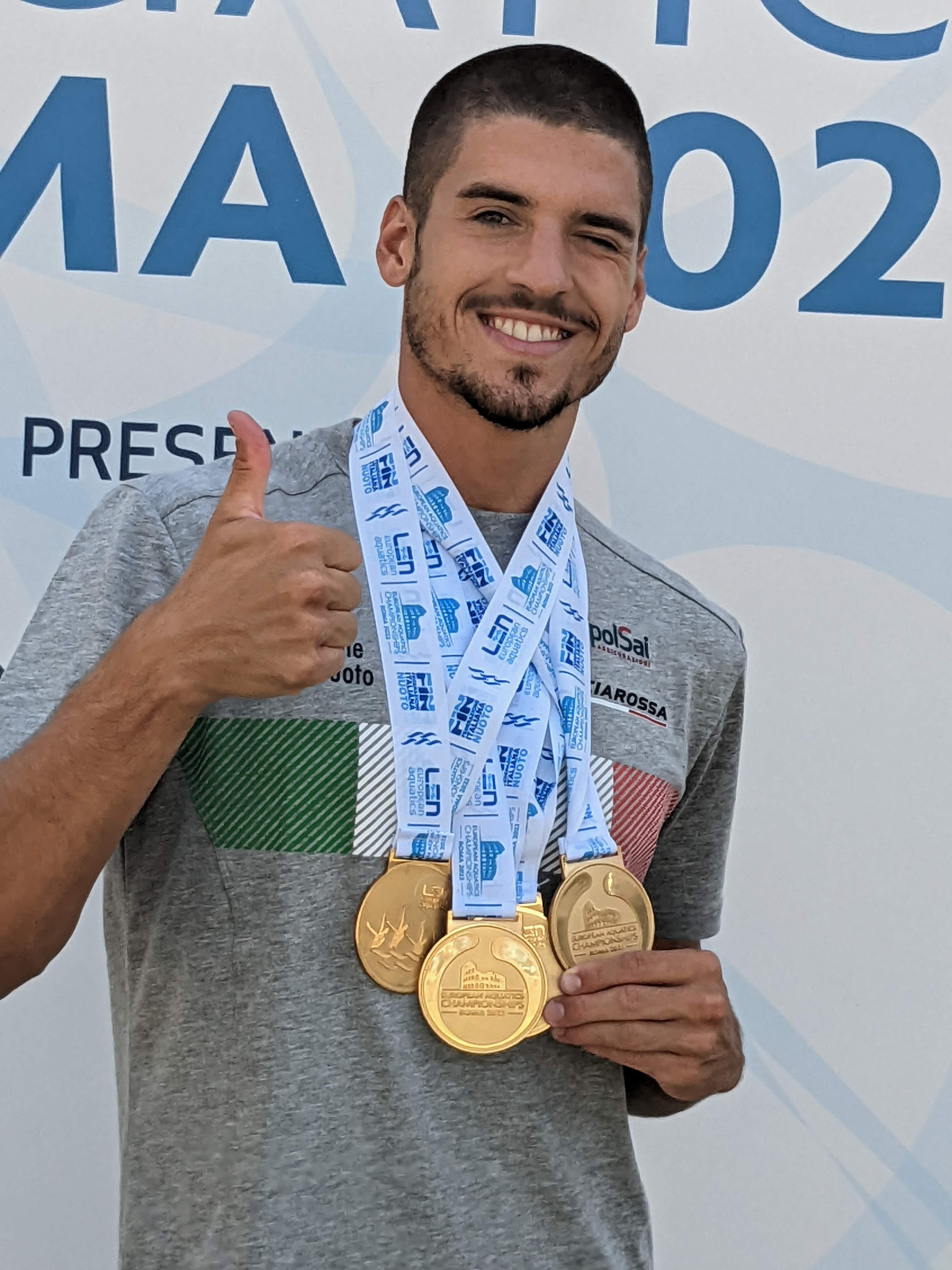
- Minisini in 2022

Personal information
- Nationality: Italian
- Born: 9 March 1996 (age 30) Rome, Italy
- Height: 1.76 m (5 ft 9 in)
- Weight: 73 kg (161 lb)

Sport
- Sport: Swimming
- Strokes: Synchronized swimming
- Club: Fiamme Oro
Medal record
Men's artistic swimming
Representing Italy
| Event | 1st | 2nd | 3rd |
|---|---|---|---|
| World Championships | 4 | 4 | 2 |
| European Championships | 4 | 5 | 1 |
| European Games | 1 | 3 | 1 |
| Total | 9 | 12 | 4 |
World Championships
| Gold medal – first place | 2017 Budapest | Mixed duet technical |
| Gold medal – first place | 2022 Budapest | Mixed duet free |
| Gold medal – first place | 2022 Budapest | Mixed duet technical |
| Gold medal – first place | 2024 Doha | Solo free routine |
| Silver medal – second place | 2017 Budapest | Mixed duet free |
| Silver medal – second place | 2019 Gwangju | Mixed duet free |
| Silver medal – second place | 2019 Gwangju | Mixed duet technical |
| Silver medal – second place | 2024 Doha | Solo technical routine |
| Bronze medal – third place | 2015 Kazan | Mixed duet free |
| Bronze medal – third place | 2015 Kazan | Mixed duet technical |
European Games
| Gold medal – first place | 2023 Kraków-Małopolska | Mixed duet technical routine |
| Silver medal – second place | 2023 Kraków-Małopolska | Team free routine |
| Silver medal – second place | 2023 Kraków-Małopolska | Mixed duet free routine |
| Silver medal – second place | 2023 Kraków-Małopolska | Team technical routine |
| Bronze medal – third place | 2023 Kraków-Małopolska | Team acrobatic routine |
European Championships
| Gold medal – first place | 2022 Rome | Solo free |
| Gold medal – first place | 2022 Rome | Solo technical |
| Gold medal – first place | 2022 Rome | Mixed duet free |
| Gold medal – first place | 2022 Rome | Mixed duet technical |
| Silver medal – second place | 2016 London | Mixed duet free |
| Silver medal – second place | 2016 London | Mixed duet technical |
| Silver medal – second place | 2018 Glasgow | Mixed duet free |
| Silver medal – second place | 2018 Glasgow | Mixed duet technical |
| Silver medal – second place | 2024 Belgrade | Solo free |
| Bronze medal – third place | 2024 Belgrade | Solo technical |

Giorgio Minisini (born 9 March 1996) is an Italian synchronised swimmer. He won two bronze medals in the inaugural mixed duet competition at the 2015 World Championships. He was world champion at the FINA World Aquatics Championships in the mixed duet technical routine in 2017 and 2022 and the mixed duet free routine in 2022. In 2022, he became the first male artistic swimmer to win a gold medal at a LEN European Aquatics Championships in a men's solo event, winning the gold medal in the solo technical routine.

== Career ==
In 2014, FINA officially approved of adding mixed-gender events in Synchronized swimming and diving under its banner after a vote at the Extraordinary Congress in Doha, Qatar.

=== 2015 ===
At the 2015 World Aquatics Championships in Kazan, Minisini represented Italy at the inaugural Mixed Duet in synchronized swimming, he won a bronze medal with duet partner Manila Flamini in Mixed Duet technical, and another bronze medal in Mixed Duet free with Mariangela Perrupato. With his win, he became the first male bronze medalist in artistic swimming at a World Championships.

=== 2022 World Championships ===
In the mixed duet technical routine at the 2022 World Aquatics Championships, he won the gold medal with his partner Lucrezia Ruggiero with a score of 89.2685 points in the final. He also won a gold medal in the mixed duet free routine with a score of 90.9667 points, finishing less than two points ahead of silver medalists Tomoka Sato and Yotaro Sato of Japan. His scores contributed to Italy being the highest scoring country across all events contested in artistic swimming at the 2022 World Aquatics Championships.

=== 2022 European Championships ===
On the second day of competition at the 2022 European Aquatics Championships, held in Rome in August, Minisini won the gold medal in the solo technical routine with a score of 85.7033 points, marking the second gold medal for Italy at the Championships across all sports. With his win, Minisini became the first man in history to win a gold medal in any solo male artistic swimming (synchronized swimming) event at a LEN European Aquatics Championships. The following day, he won a gold medal in the mixed duet free routine, scoring 89.7333 points with partner Lucrezia Ruggiero. Minisini won his third gold medal of the Championships on day four, placing first in the solo free routine with a score of 88.4667 to win the first-ever gold medal in the event at a LEN European Aquatics Championships. For his final event, the mixed duet technical routine, he won the gold medal with Lucrezia Ruggiero, scoring 89.3679 points. title=No Male Following his performances at the Championships, in December, the International Olympic Committee announced it would include up to two men in the teams of eight for the team event at the 2024 Olympic Games and they would not include male solo, male duet, nor mixed duet events, to which Minisini applauded the decision to include men in some form (up to 25% of team event member composition allowed). However, he was cut from the 2024 Italian Olympic team.

== International championships ==
| Meet | solo technical | solo free | mixed duet technical | mixed duet free |
|---|---|---|---|---|
| WC 2015 | —N/a | —N/a | (bronze) (86.3640) | (bronze) (89.3333) |
| EC 2016 | —N/a | —N/a | (silver) (86.1772) | (silver) (87.4667) |
| WC 2017 | —N/a | —N/a | (gold) (90.2979) | (silver) (91.1000) |
| EC 2018 | —N/a | —N/a | (silver) (88.6973) | (silver) (90.7333) |
| WC 2019 | —N/a | —N/a | (silver) (90.8511) | (silver) (91.8333) |
| WC 2022 | —N/a | —N/a | (gold) (89.2685) | (gold) (90.9667) |
| EC 2022 | (gold) (85.7033) | (gold) (88.4667) | (gold) (89.3679) | (gold) (89.7333) |
