= Christina Jones =

American synchronized swimmer (born 1987)

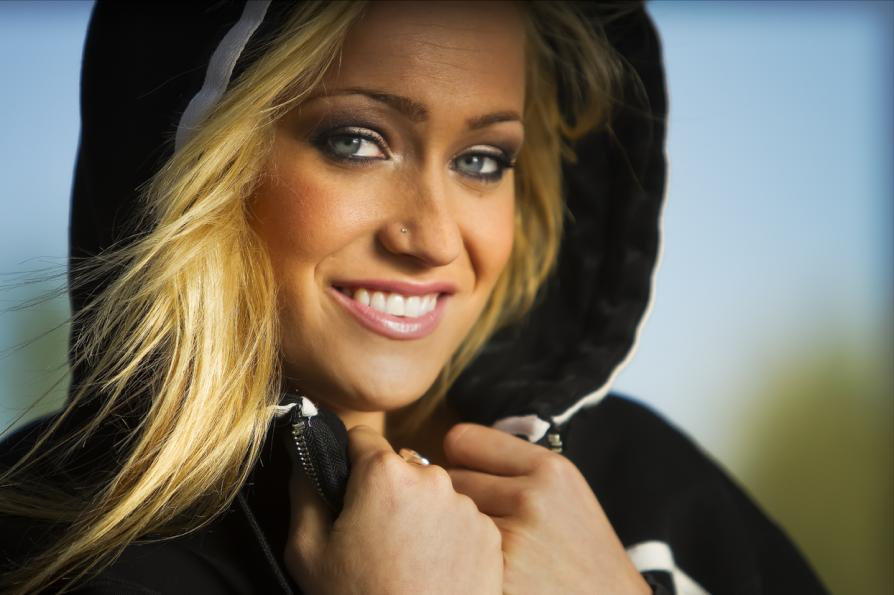
- Jones in 2010

Personal information
- Full name: Christina Noelle Jones
- Born: September 17, 1987 (age 38) Missoula, Montana, U.S.

Sport
- Country: United States
- Sport: Synchronized swimming
Medal record
World Championships
Gold medal – first place	2015 Kazan	Mixed duet technical routine

Christina Noelle Jones (born September 17, 1987) is an American competitor in synchronized swimming. She grew up in Fremont, California and lives in Las Vegas, Nevada.

Jones swam with Andrea Nott in the duet event at the 2008 Summer Olympics in Beijing, placing fifth. She also participated on the American team that placed fifth in synchronized team.

At the 2015 World Aquatics Championships, she won a gold medal in the mixed duet technical routine with swim partner Bill May.

Jones is an artist in Cirque du Soleil's water-based show, O.
