= Emma García =

Spanish synchronized swimmer

Personal information
- Full name: Emma García García
- Nationality: Spanish
- Born: 13 January 1999 (age 27)

Sport
- Country: Spain
- Sport: Synchronised swimming
Medal record
Women's artistic swimming
Representing Spain
Event	1st	2nd	3rd
World Championships	0	1	1
European Championships	1	3	1
European Games	0	1	0
Total	1	5	2
World Championships
Silver medal – second place	2023 Fukuoka	Mixed duet technical routine
Bronze medal – third place	2022 Budapest	Highlights routine
European Games
Silver medal – second place	2023 Kraków-Małopolska	Mixed duet technical routine
European Championships
Gold medal – first place	2024 Belgrade	Mixed free routine
Silver medal – second place	2020 Budapest	Mixed technical routine
Silver medal – second place	2022 Rome	Mixed free routine
Silver medal – second place	2022 Rome	Mixed technical routine
Bronze medal – third place	2018 Glasgow	Free routine combination

Emma García García (born 13 January 1999) is a Spanish synchronised swimmer.

She won a bronze medal in the free routine combination competition at the 2018 European Aquatics Championships.
