= San Marino at the 2025 World Aquatics Championships =

- Flag of San Marino
- World Aquatics code: SMR
- National federation: Federazione Sammarinese Nuoto
- Website: www.fsn.sm

in Singapore
- Competitors: 1 in 1 sport
- Medals: Gold 0 Silver 0 Bronze 0 Total 0

World Aquatics Championships appearances
- 1994; 1998; 2001; 2003; 2005; 2007; 2009; 2011; 2013; 2015; 2017; 2019; 2022; 2023; 2024; 2025

San Marino is competing at the 2025 World Aquatics Championships in Singapore from 11 July to 3 August 2025.

== Competitors ==
The following is the list of competitors in the Championships.

Sport	Men	Women	Total
Artistic swimming	0	1	1
Total	0	1	1

== Artistic swimming ==
Women

Athlete	Event	Preliminary		Final	
Athlete	Event	Points	Rank	Points	Rank
Jasmine Verbena	Solo technical	229.8858	14	Did not advance	
Jasmine Verbena	Solo free	214.1775	9 Q	216.6937	10
