= Artistic swimming at the 2024 World Aquatics Championships – Women's duet free routine =

Women's duet free routine at the 2024 World Aquatics Championships
- Venue: Aspire Dome
- Location: Doha, Qatar
- Dates: 7 February (preliminary); 8 February (final)
- Competitors: 76 from 38 nations
- Teams: 38
- Winning points: 250.7729

Medalists
gold medal	Wang Liuyi; Wang Qianyi	China
silver medal	Bregje de Brouwer; Noortje de Brouwer	Netherlands
bronze medal	Kate Shortman; Isabelle Thorpe	Great Britain

The Women's duet free routine competition at the 2024 World Aquatics Championships was held on 7 and 8 February 2024.

== Results ==
The preliminary round was started on 7 February at 09:30. The final was started on 8 February at 14:00.

Green denotes finalists

Rank	Swimmers	Nationality	Preliminary		Final	
Rank	Swimmers	Nationality	Points	Rank	Points	Rank
1st place, gold medalist(s)	Wang Liuyi; Wang Qianyi	China	250.8438	1	250.7729	1
2nd place, silver medalist(s)	Bregje de Brouwer; Noortje de Brouwer	Netherlands	244.2439	2	250.4979	2
3rd place, bronze medalist(s)	Kate Shortman; Isabelle Thorpe	Great Britain	237.1042	3	247.2626	3
4	Alisa Ozhogina; Iris Tió	Spain	236.9958	4	243.9918	4
5	Audrey Lamothe; Jacqueline Simoneau	Canada	234.9855	5	239.0563	5
6	Sofia Malkogeorgou; Evangelia Platanioti	Greece	232.8188	6	236.7834	6
7	Linda Cerruti; Lucrezia Ruggiero	Italy	231.1168	8	233.9957	7
8	Maryna Aleksiiva; Vladyslava Aleksiiva	Ukraine	232.3936	7	233.1437	8
9	Shelly Bobritsky; Ariel Nassee	Israel	226.7439	9	228.4708	9
10	Hur Yoon-seo; Lee Ri-young	South Korea	215.2875	10	213.5979	10
11	Kyra Hoevertsz; Mikayla Morales	Aruba	196.3771	11	199.0876	11
12	Melisa Ceballos; Estefanía Roa	Colombia	190.4313	12	185.7103	12
13	Noemi Büchel; Leila Marxer	Liechtenstein	189.4106	13	Did not advance	
14	Arina Pushkina; Yasmin Tuyakova	Kazakhstan	188.3146	14	Did not advance	
15	Johanna Bleyer; Klara Bleyer	Germany	186.8874	15	Did not advance	
16	Nadine Barsoum; Hana Hiekal	Egypt	183.8062	16	Did not advance	
17	Laura Miccuci; Gabriela Regly	Brazil	179.1250	17	Did not advance	
18	Chiara Diky; Lea Anna Krajčovičová	Slovakia	177.6645	18	Did not advance	
19	Maria Gonçalves; Cheila Vieira	Portugal	172.4542	19	Did not advance	
20	Yvette Chong; Debbie Soh	Singapore	170.9959	20	Did not advance	
21	Carolyn Buckle; Kiera Gazzard	Australia	161.2521	21	Did not advance	
22	Thea Grima Buttigieg; Emily Ruggier	Malta	158.6000	22	Did not advance	
23	Pongpimporn Pongsuwan; Supitchaya Songpan	Thailand	153.1542	23	Did not advance	
24	María Ccoyllo; Adriana Toulier	Peru	151.1249	24	Did not advance	
25	Karolína Klusková; Aneta Mrázková	Czech Republic	150.6167	25	Did not advance	
26	Blanka Barbócz; Angelika Bastianelli	Hungary	150.5209	26	Did not advance	
27	Duru Kanberoğlu; Bade Yıldız	Turkey	149.1166	27	Did not advance	
28	Cesia Castaneda; Grecia Mendoza	El Salvador	143.1771	28	Did not advance	
29	Mari Alavidze; Tekla Gogilidze	Georgia	141.7354	29	Did not advance	
30	Diana Onkes; Ziyodakhon Toshkhujaeva	Uzbekistan	140.4958	30	Did not advance	
31	Agustina Medina; Lucía Ververis	Uruguay	137.9854	31	Did not advance	
32	María Alfaro; Anna Mitinian	Costa Rica	118.6812	32	Did not advance	
33	Nina Brown; Eva Morris	New Zealand	116.8854	33	Did not advance	
34	Tiziana Bonucci; Luisina Caussi	Argentina	111.6167	34	Did not advance	
35	Gabriel Zhou; Lam Cheng Tong	Macau	105.5105	35	Did not advance	
36	Gabriela Alpajón; Dayaris Varona	Cuba	100.2688	36	Did not advance	
37	Hilda Tri Julyandra; Gabrielle Permata Sari	Indonesia	87.5688	37	Did not advance	
38	Grace Borrebach; Kyra van den Berg	Curaçao	81.0250	38	Did not advance	
–	Jennah Hafsi; Noah Kroon	Morocco	Did not start			
–	Jessica Hayes-Hill; Laura Strugnell	South Africa	Did not start			
