= Uzbekistan at the 2015 World Aquatics Championships =

- Flag of Uzbekistan
- FINA code: UZB
- National federation: Uzbekistan Swimming Federation

in Kazan, Russia
- Competitors: 12 in 3 sports
- Medals: Gold 0 Silver 0 Bronze 0 Total 0

World Aquatics Championships appearances
- 1994; 1998; 2001; 2003; 2005; 2007; 2009; 2011; 2013; 2015; 2017; 2019; 2022; 2023; 2024

Other related appearances
- Soviet Union (1973–1991)

Uzbekistan competed at the 2015 World Aquatics Championships in Kazan, Russia from 24 July to 9 August 2015.

== Diving ==
Uzbek divers qualified for the individual spots at the World Championships.

Men

Athlete	Event	Preliminaries		Semifinals		Final	
Athlete	Event	Points	Rank	Points	Rank	Points	Rank
Mirzokhid Mirkarimov	1 m springboard	234.15	38	—		did not advance	
Doston Botirov	3 m springboard	272.80	57	did not advance			
Botir Khasanov	10 m platform	209.25	48	did not advance			

== Swimming ==
Uzbek swimmers have achieved qualifying standards in the following events (up to a maximum of 2 swimmers in each event at the A-standard entry time, and 1 at the B-standard):

Men

Athlete	Event	Heat		Semifinal		Final	
Athlete	Event	Time	Rank	Time	Rank	Time	Rank
Danil Bukin	50 m backstroke	26.42	=40	did not advance			
Aleksey Derlyugov	200 m individual medley	2:04.98	35	did not advance			
Vladislav Mustafin	50 m breaststroke	27.51	15 Q	27.79	16	did not advance	
Vladislav Mustafin	100 m breaststroke	1:00.63	20	did not advance			
Vladislav Mustafin	200 m breaststroke	2:14.31	30	did not advance			
Daniil Tulupov	100 m freestyle	50.71	51	did not advance			
Khurshidjon Tursunov	200 m freestyle	1:50.98	46	did not advance			
Daniil Tulupov; Danil Bukin; Aleksey Derlyugov; Khurshidjon Tursunov	4 × 100 m freestyle relay	3:26.36	27	—		did not advance	
Danil Bukin; Aleksey Derlyugov; Vladislav Mustafin; Daniil Tulupov	4 × 100 m medley relay	3:42.33	22	—		did not advance	

Women

Athlete	Event	Heat		Semifinal		Final	
Athlete	Event	Time	Rank	Time	Rank	Time	Rank
Ranohon Amanova	200 m individual medley	2:15.13	24	did not advance			
Ranohon Amanova	400 m individual medley	4:47.85	24	—		did not advance	
Yulduz Kuchkarova	50 m backstroke	29.37	32	did not advance			
Yulduz Kuchkarova	100 m backstroke	1:02.80	39	did not advance			

== Synchronized swimming ==
Uzbekistan has qualified two synchronized swimmers to compete in each of the following events.

Athlete	Event	Preliminaries		Final	
Athlete	Event	Points	Rank	Points	Rank
Yuliya Kim; Anastasiya Ruzmetsova	Duet technical routine	73.9526	25	did not advance	
Yuliya Kim; Anastasiya Ruzmetsova	Duet free routine	77.5000	21	did not advance	
