= Uzbekistan at the 2022 World Aquatics Championships =

- Flag of Uzbekistan
- FINA code: UZB
- National federation: Uzbekistan Swimming Federation

in Budapest, Hungary
- Competitors: 7 in 3 sports
- Medals: Gold 0 Silver 0 Bronze 0 Total 0

World Aquatics Championships appearances
- 1994; 1998; 2001; 2003; 2005; 2007; 2009; 2011; 2013; 2015; 2017; 2019; 2022; 2023; 2024

Other related appearances
- Soviet Union (1973–1991)

Uzbekistan competed at the 2022 World Aquatics Championships in Budapest, Hungary from 17 June to 3 July.

== Artistic swimming ==
Uzbekistan entered three artistic swimmers. Anna Vashchenko did not compete in the duet free routine competition.

Women

Athlete	Event	Preliminaries		Final	
Athlete	Event	Points	Rank	Points	Rank
Diana Onkes; Ziyodakhon Toshkhujaeva	Duet free routine	81.3333	14	did not advance	

== Diving ==
Uzbekistan entered three divers.

Men

Athlete	Event	Preliminaries		Semifinals		Final	
Athlete	Event	Points	Rank	Points	Rank	Points	Rank
Kamronbek Khodjimov	3 m springboard	106.55	55	did not advance			
Botir Khasanov; Marsel Zaynetdinov	10 m synchronized platform	232.89	14	—		did not advance	

== Swimming ==
Uzbekistan entered two swimmers.

Men

Athlete	Event	Heat		Semifinal		Final	
Athlete	Event	Time	Rank	Time	Rank	Time	Rank
Aleksey Tarasenko	100 m freestyle	49.35	31	did not advance			
Aleksey Tarasenko	200 metre freestyle	1:49.87	34	did not advance			
Khurshidjon Tursunov	50 m freestyle	23.20	52	did not advance			
Khurshidjon Tursunov	50 m butterfly	25.44	54	did not advance			
