= Uzbekistan at the 2017 World Aquatics Championships =

- Flag of Uzbekistan
- FINA code: UZB
- National federation: Uzbekistan Swimming Federation

in Budapest, Hungary
- Competitors: 17 in 3 sports
- Medals: Gold 0 Silver 0 Bronze 0 Total 0

World Aquatics Championships appearances
- 1994; 1998; 2001; 2003; 2005; 2007; 2009; 2011; 2013; 2015; 2017; 2019; 2022; 2023; 2024

Other related appearances
- Soviet Union (1973–1991)

Uzbekistan is scheduled to compete at the 2017 World Aquatics Championships in Budapest, Hungary from 14 July to 30 July.

== Diving ==
Uzbekistan has entered 3 divers (two male and one female).

Athlete	Event	Preliminaries		Semifinals		Final	
Athlete	Event	Points	Rank	Points	Rank	Points	Rank
Doston Botirov	Men's 3 m springboard	49.50	56	did not advance			
Yuliya Nushtaeva; Botir Khasanov	Mixed 10 m synchronized platform	—				196.20	16

== Swimming ==
Uzbek swimmers have achieved qualifying standards in the following events (up to a maximum of 2 swimmers in each event at the A-standard entry time, and 1 at the B-standard):

Athlete	Event	Heat		Semifinal		Final	
Athlete	Event	Time	Rank	Time	Rank	Time	Rank
Daniil Bukin	Men's 200 m backstroke	2:03.49	36	did not advance			
Artyom Kozlyuk	Men's 50 m butterfly	24.20	34	did not advance			
Artyom Kozlyuk	Men's 100 m butterfly	52.95	31	did not advance			
Aleksey Tarasenko	Men's 50 m freestyle	23.37	=62	did not advance			
Khurshidjon Tursunov	Men's 100 m freestyle	49.91	45	did not advance			
Khurshidjon Tursunov	Men's 200 m freestyle	1:51.13	50	did not advance			
Daniil Bukin; Artyom Kozlyuk; Aleksey Tarasenko; Khurshidjon Tursunov	Men's 4 × 100 m freestyle relay	3:25.10	19	—		did not advance	

== Synchronized swimming ==
Uzbekistan's synchronized swimming team consisted of 10 athletes (10 female).

Women

Athlete	Event	Preliminaries		Final	
Athlete	Event	Points	Rank	Points	Rank
Anastasiya Ruzmetova; Gulsanam Yuldasheva; Yuliya Kim (R)	Duet technical routine	76.2008	23	did not advance	
Anna Eltisheva; Khurshida Khakimova; Yuliya Kim; Anastasiya Morozova; Anastasiya Ruzmetova; Nigora Shomakhsudova; Khonzodakhon Toshkhujaeva; Mokhirakhon Tulkinova (R); Gulsanam Yuldasheva	Team technical routine	74.8230	16	did not advance	
Anna Eltisheva; Khurshida Khakimova; Yuliya Kim; Anastasiya Morozova; Anastasiya Ruzmetova; Nigora Shomakhsudova; Khonzodakhon Toshkhujaeva; Mokhirakhon Tulkinova (R); Gulsanam Yuldasheva	Team free routine	77.3333	17	did not advance	
Anna Eltisheva; Khurshida Khakimova; Yuliya Kim; Anastasiya Morozova; Anastasiya Ruzmetova; Nigora Shomakhsudova; Khonzodakhon Toshkhujaeva; Mokhirakhon Tulkinova; Nozimakhon Tulkinova; Gulsanam Yuldasheva	Free routine combination	76.8333	14	did not advance	

Legend: (R) = Reserve Athlete
