= Artistic swimming at the 2024 European Aquatics Championships – Women's duet free routine =

Women's duet free routine at the 2024 European Aquatics Championships
- Venue: Sports Centre Milan Gale Muškatirović
- Dates: 11 June (preliminary); 12 June (final)
- Competitors: 20 from 10 nations
- Winning points: 264.6584

Medalists
| gold medal | Bregje de Brouwer; Noortje de Brouwer | Netherlands |
| silver medal | Isabelle Thorpe; Kate Shortman | Great Britain |
| bronze medal | Shelly Bobritsky; Ariel Nassee | Israel |

The Women's duet free routine competition of the 2024 European Aquatics Championships was held on 11 and 12 June 2024.

== Results ==
The preliminary round was held on 11 June at 10:30. The final was held on 12 June at 16:30.

| Rank | Swimmer | Nationality | Preliminary | | Final | |
| Rank | Swimmer | Nationality | Points | Rank | Points | Rank |
|---|---|---|---|---|---|---|
| 1st place, gold medalist(s) | Bregje de Brouwer; Noortje de Brouwer | Netherlands | 259.0126 | 1 | 264.6584 | 1 |
| 2nd place, silver medalist(s) | Isabelle Thorpe; Kate Shortman | Great Britain | 253.9750 | 2 | 261.0313 | 2 |
| 3rd place, bronze medalist(s) | Shelly Bobritsky; Ariel Nassee | Israel | 238.0645 | 3 | 245.6105 | 3 |
| 4 | Sarah Maria Rizea; Flaminia Vernice | Italy | 217.7876 | 4 | 221.0939 | 4 |
| 5 | Klara Bleyer; Susana Rovner | Germany | 204.8936 | 5 | 192.1063 | 5 |
| 6 | Sasha Miteva; Dalia Penkova | Bulgaria | 150.6374 | 7 | 166.3292 | 6 |
| 7 | Mari Moilala; Iiris-Maria Nurmi | Finland | 153.9813 | 6 | 158.1103 | 7 |
| 8 | Korina Maretić; Mia Piri | Croatia | 140.5290 | 8 | 146.0770 | 8 |
| 9 | Maša Avramović; Karin Pesrl | Slovenia | 104.2834 | 10 | 128.0813 | 9 |
| 10 | Duru Kanberoğlu; Bade Yıldız | Turkey | 134.8353 | 9 | 106.0415 | 10 |
