= Artistic swimming at the 2024 European Aquatics Championships – Women's duet technical routine =

Women's duet technical routine at the 2024 European Aquatics Championships
- Venue: Sports Centre Milan Gale Muškatirović
- Dates: 14 June
- Competitors: 26 from 13 nations
- Winning points: 260.6567

Medalists
gold medal	Bregje de Brouwer; Noortje de Brouwer	Netherlands
silver medal	Isabelle Thorpe; Kate Shortman	Great Britain
bronze medal	Shelly Bobritsky; Ariel Nassee	Israel

The Women's duet technical routine competition of the 2024 European Aquatics Championships was held on 13 June 2024.

== Results ==
The final was held on 14 June at 10:30.

Rank	Swimmers	Nationality	Points
1st place, gold medalist(s)	Bregje de Brouwer; Noortje de Brouwer	Netherlands	260.6567
2nd place, silver medalist(s)	Isabelle Thorpe; Kate Shortman	Great Britain	256.7184
3rd place, bronze medalist(s)	Shelly Bobritsky; Ariel Nassee	Israel	243.6250
4	Maria Gonçalves; Cheila Vieira	Portugal	223.8266
5	Sofia Malkogeorgou; Evangelia Platanioti	Greece	220.6701
6	Sarah Maria Rizea; Flaminia Vernice	Italy	199.2867
7	Johanna Bleyer; Klara Bleyer	Germany	194.2267
8	Karolína Klusková; Aneta Mrázková	Czech Republic	193.1550
9	Sasha Miteva; Dalia Penkova	Bulgaria	181.2833
10	Korina Maretić; Mia Piri	Croatia	177.1433
11	Maria Alavidze; Ani Kipiani	Georgia	152.8858
12	Duru Kanberoğlu; Bade Yıldız	Turkey	152.3967
13	Maša Avramović; Karin Pesrl	Slovenia	151.5300
