= Artistic swimming at the 2023 World Aquatics Championships – Women's solo technical routine =

Women's solo technical routine at the 2023 World Aquatics Championships
- Venue: Marine Messe Fukuoka
- Location: Fukuoka, Japan
- Dates: 14 July (preliminary); 15 July (final)
- Competitors: 30 from 30 nations
- Winning points: 276.5717

Medalists
gold medal	Yukiko Inui	Japan
silver medal	Vasiliki Alexandri	Austria
bronze medal	Iris Tió	Spain

The women's solo technical routine was an artistic swimming competition at the 2023 World Aquatics Championships was held on 14 and 15 July 2023.

== Results ==
The preliminary round was started on 14 July at 08:38. The final was held on 15 July at 19:30.

Green denotes finalists

Rank	Swimmer	Nationality	Preliminary		Final	
Rank	Swimmer	Nationality	Points	Rank	Points	Rank
1st place, gold medalist(s)	Yukiko Inui	Japan	273.2700	1	276.5717	1
2nd place, silver medalist(s)	Vasiliki Alexandri	Austria	232.8367	3	264.4200	2
3rd place, bronze medalist(s)	Iris Tió	Spain	204.6666	7	254.2100	3
4	Evangelia Platanioti	Greece	252.2400	2	242.5000	4
5	Susanna Pedotti	Italy	193.1283	12	223.7133	5
6	Audrey Lamothe	Canada	214.9417	6	216.4351	6
7	Kyra Hoevertsz	Aruba	193.9400	11	212.1967	7
8	Klara Bleyer	Germany	200.9649	9	202.4266	8
9	Lee Ri-young	South Korea	201.7866	8	200.8383	9
10	Oriane Jaillardon	France	229.7233	4	193.4234	10
11	Karina Magrupova	Kazakhstan	195.3433	10	192.3200	11
12	Kate Shortman	Great Britain	223.6033	5	192.0267	12
13	Viktória Reichová	Slovakia	181.4233	13	Did not advance	
14	Jasmine Verbena	San Marino	178.0966	14	Did not advance	
15	Jennah Hafsi	Morocco	175.6200	15	Did not advance	
16	Nadine Barsoum	Egypt	174.5900	16	Did not advance	
17	Antonia Mella	Chile	174.3566	17	Did not advance	
18	Aleksandra Atanasova	Bulgaria	168.2733	18	Did not advance	
19	Patrawee Chayawararak	Thailand	168.1863	19	Did not advance	
20	Gulsanam Bukina	Uzbekistan	166.3867	20	Did not advance	
21	Karolína Klusková	Czech Republic	165.1000	21	Did not advance	
22	Ana Culic	Malta	165.0033	22	Did not advance	
23	Ece Üngör	Turkey	163.0701	23	Did not advance	
24	Mari Alavidze	Georgia	162.0168	24	Did not advance	
25	Gabriela Alpajón	Cuba	160.7934	25	Did not advance	
26	Skye MacDonald	South Africa	158.9600	26	Did not advance	
27	Nika Seljak	Slovenia	155.9468	27	Did not advance	
28	Marfa Chragina	Sweden	148.3234	28	Did not advance	
29	María Alfaro	Costa Rica	148.2166	29	Did not advance	
30	Alexandra Mansaré-Traoré	Guinea	140.8950	30	Did not advance	
