= Artistic swimming at the 2023 European Games – Duet free routine =

Duet free at the 2023 European Games
- Venue: Oswiecim
- Dates: 21 June (preliminary); 24 June (final)
- Competitors: 36 from 18 nations
- Winning points: 255.9501

Medalists
gold medal	Anna-Maria Alexandri; Eirini-Marina Alexandri	Austria
silver medal	Maryna Aleksiyiva; Vladyslava Aleksiyiva	Ukraine
bronze medal	Kate Shortman; Isabelle Thorpe	Great Britain

The Duet free routine competition of the 2023 European Games was held on 21 and 24 June 2023 in Oswiecim, Poland. Together with the Duet Technical event, it formed part of a direct qualification competition for the 2024 Summer Olympics.

== Preliminary round ==
In the preliminary rounds all eighteen pairs of entrants competed, with the top twelve pairs progressing to the final.

Rank	Athletes	Nation	D	E	A	P	Total	Notes
1	Anna-Maria Alexandri; Eirini-Marina Alexandri	Austria	40.400	172.3959	92.7500	-1.6	265.1459	Q
2	Maryna Aleksiyiva; Vladyslava Aleksiyiva	Ukraine	34.450	140.6522	93.3500	-1.7	234.0022	Q
3	Ariel Nassee; Shelly Bobritsky	Israel	32.900	130.3188	87.0500	-2.7	217.3688	Q
4	Alisa Ozhogina; Iris Tió	Spain	28.600	117.9000	92.3000	-1.4	210.2000	Q
5	Kate Shortman; Isabelle Thorpe	Great Britain	29.800	118.8523	88.1500	-1.7	207.0023	Q
6	Linda Cerruti; Lucrezia Ruggiero	Italy	23.750	101.0749	92.3000	-2.1	193.3749	Q
7	Bregje de Brouwer; Marloes Steenbeek	Netherlands	23.800	97.6314	87.6500	-1.9	185.2814	Q
8	Maria Beatriz Gonçalves; Cheila Morais	Portugal	26.150	99.4063	83.9000	-1.9	183.3063	Q
9	Noemi Büchel; Leila Marxer	Liechtenstein	25.000	94.4313	79.6500	-2.8	174.0813	Q
10	Klara Bleyer; Susana Rovner	Germany	19.700	66.8416	80.9500	-9.9	147.7916	Q
11	Blanka Barbócz; Angelika Bastianelli	Hungary	21.050	71.4292	75.8500	-5.1	147.2792	Q
12	Sasha Miteva; Dalia Penkova	Bulgaria	19.500	68.9315	75.5000	-4.2	144.4315	Q
13	Karoline Christensen; Mia Heide	Denmark	17.150	54.5958	70.8000	-2.4	125.3958	
14	Karolína Klusková; Aneta Mrázková	Czech Republic	15.800	44.7582	77.6000	-15.5	122.3582	
15	Karin Pesrl; Nika Seljak	Slovenia	15.750	46.9209	70.9000	-5.6	117.8209	
16	Maria Alavidze; Ani Kipiani	Georgia	13.950	42.9605	74.6500	-8.3	117.6105	
17	Nikola Leja; Swietłana Szczepańska	Poland	8.300	17.0501	71.0000	-12.4	88.0501	
18	Ksenija Grabtšuk; Maria Ruditš	Estonia	7.450	5.6625	62.7500	-15.8	68.4125	

== Final ==
In the final, all twelve duets perform in reverse order of qualification.

Rank	Athletes	Nation	D	E	A	P	Total	Notes
1st place, gold medalist(s)	Anna-Maria Alexandri; Eirini-Marina Alexandri	Austria	40.400	164.1501	91.8000	-3.5	255.9501	
2nd place, silver medalist(s)	Maryna Aleksiiva; Vladyslava Aleksiiva	Ukraine	35.700	139.5938	93.2500	-3.1	232.8438	
3rd place, bronze medalist(s)	Kate Shortman; Isabelle Thorpe	Great Britain	34.500	135.9584	87.5500	-3.4	223.5084	
4	Ariel Nassee; Shelly Bobritsky	Israel	29.900	114.3750	86.5500	-3.1	200.9250	
5	Bregje de Brouwer; Marloes Steenbeek	Netherlands	28.750	110.0023	86.5500	-5.6	196.5523	
6	Alisa Ozhogina; Iris Tió	Spain	26.050	100.5145	93.0000	-3.2	193.5145	
7	Maria Beatriz Gonçalves; Cheila Morais	Portugal	23.800	86.5231	84.8500	-2.9	171.3731	
8	Linda Cerruti; Lucrezia Ruggiero	Italy	19.450	77.4125	88.8000	-4.1	166.2125	
9	Noemi Büchel; Leila Marxer	Liechtenstein	21.550	74.6395	79.5000	-4.2	154.1395	
10	Klara Bleyer; Susana Rovner	Germany	15.350	51.0854	80.3500	-6.3	131.4354	
11	Blanka Barbócz; Angelika Bastianelli	Hungary	15.200	48.2000	75.8500	-4.7	124.0500	
12	Sasha Miteva; Dalia Penkova	Bulgaria	15.100	50.0229	73.8000	-4.2	123.8229	
