= Artistic swimming at the 2024 Summer Olympics – Women's duet =

Women's Duet at the Games of the XXXIII Olympiad
- Venue: Paris Aquatic Centre
- Dates: 9-10 August
- Competitors: 36 from 18 nations

Medalists
| 1st place, gold medalist(s) | | Wang Liuyi; Wang Qianyi | China |
| 2nd place, silver medalist(s) | | Kate Shortman; Isabelle Thorpe | Great Britain |
| 3rd place, bronze medalist(s) | | Bregje de Brouwer; Noortje de Brouwer | Netherlands |

The women's duet event at the 2024 Summer Olympics was held from 9 to 10 August 2024 at the Paris Aquatic Centre. In the absence of Russian swimmers, the Chinese pair of Wang Liuyi and Wang Qianyi broke the Russian streak of six consecutive titles. The minor medals went to Great Britain's Kate Shortman and Isabelle Thorpe and the Netherlands' Bregje and Noortje de Brouwer, the first Olympic medals in the sport for both nations.

== Qualification ==
For the duet, the highest-ranked NOC from each of the five continental meets that did not have a qualified team received a spot, while the remaining NOCs competed for the three remaining spots through the 2024 World Aquatics Championships. All ten NOCs eligible to compete in the team event were required to select two members to form a duet.

== Competition format ==
The competition consisted of the technical routine and free routine. The points accumulated from each of these routines were added together to determine the final ranking.

== Schedule ==
All times are Central European Summer Time (UTC+2)

Schedule
| Date | Time | Round |
|---|---|---|
| 9 August 2024 | 19:30 | Technical routine |
| 10 August 2024 | 19:30 | Free routine |

== Results ==
| Rank | NOC | Athletes | Technical Routine | Free Routine | Total points |
|---|---|---|---|---|---|
| 1st place, gold medalist(s) | China | Wang Liuyi & Wang Qianyi | 276.7867 | 289.6916 | 566.4783 |
| 2nd place, silver medalist(s) | Great Britain | Kate Shortman & Isabelle Thorpe | 264.0282 | 294.5085 | 558.5367 |
| 3rd place, bronze medalist(s) | Netherlands | Bregje de Brouwer & Noortje de Brouwer | 264.7066 | 293.6897 | 558.3963 |
| 4 | Austria | Anna-Maria Alexandri & Eirini-Marina Alexandri | 267.2533 | 288.4145 | 555.6678 |
| 5 | Ukraine | Maryna Aleksiiva & Vladyslava Aleksiiva | 260.4600 | 278.2084 | 538.6684 |
| 6 | Greece | Sofia Malkogeorgou & Evangelia Platanioti | 250.4584 | 281.8418 | 532.3002 |
| 7 | Spain | Alisa Ozhogina & Iris Tió Casas | 254.0816 | 267.4021 | 521.4837 |
| 8 | Japan | Moe Higa & Tomoka Sato | 257.3533 | 249.7271 | 507.0804 |
| 9 | Canada | Audrey Lamothe & Jacqueline Simoneau | 201.5167 | 290.9103 | 492.4270 |
| 10 | United States | Jaime Czarkowski & Megumi Field | 230.7134 | 254.0354 | 484.7488 |
| 11 | Israel | Shelly Bobritsky & Ariel Nassee | 243.0666 | 239.3416 | 482.4082 |
| 12 | Mexico | Nuria Diosdado & Joana Jimenez | 238.9383 | 232.6563 | 471.5946 |
| 13 | South Korea | Hur Yoon-seo & Lee Ri-young | 227.5667 | 227.7500 | 455.3167 |
| 14 | France | Anastasia Bayandina & Romane Lunel | 241.3116 | 189.0687 | 430.3803 |
| 15 | Egypt | Nadine Barsoum & Hana Hiekal | 196.5250 | 225.6541 | 422.1791 |
| 16 | Australia | Rayna Buckle & Kiera Gazzard | 210.0782 | 198.0271 | 408.1053 |
| 17 | New Zealand | Nina Brown & Eva Morris | 188.0901 | 166.5105 | 354.6006 |
| | Italy | Linda Cerruti & Lucrezia Ruggiero | DNS | | |
