= Uzbekistan at the 2019 World Aquatics Championships =

- Flag of Uzbekistan
- FINA code: UZB
- National federation: Uzbekistan Swimming Federation

in Gwangju, South Korea
- Medals: Gold 0 Silver 0 Bronze 0 Total 0

World Aquatics Championships appearances
- 1994; 1998; 2001; 2003; 2005; 2007; 2009; 2011; 2013; 2015; 2017; 2019; 2022; 2023; 2024

Other related appearances
- Soviet Union (1973–1991)

Uzbekistan competed at the 2019 World Aquatics Championships in Gwangju, South Korea from 12 to 28 July.

== Artistic swimming ==
Uzbekistan entered five artistic swimmers.

Women

Athlete	Event	Preliminaries		Final	
Athlete	Event	Points	Rank	Points	Rank
Khonzodakhon Toshkhujaeva	Solo technical routine	76.1548	16	Did not advance	
Khonzodakhon Toshkhujaeva	Solo free routine	76.8333	20	Did not advance	
Anna Eltisheva; Anastasiya Morozova	Duet technical routine	77.6988	23	Did not advance	
Anna Eltisheva; Anastasiya Morozova	Duet free routine	77.7000	22	Did not advance	

Mixed

Athlete	Event	Preliminaries		Final	
Athlete	Event	Points	Rank	Points	Rank
Dinara Ibragimova; Vyacheslav Rudnev	Duet free routine	74.2333	9 Q	74.4333	9

== Diving ==
Uzbekistan entered three divers.

Men

Athlete	Event	Preliminaries		Semifinals		Final	
Athlete	Event	Points	Rank	Points	Rank	Points	Rank
Davron Botirov	3 m springboard	251.45	55	Did not advance			
Botir Khasanov; Marsel Zaynetdinov	10 m synchronized platform	255.45	17	—		Did not advance	

== Swimming ==
Uzbekistan entered seven swimmers.

Men

Athlete	Event	Heat		Semifinal		Final	
Athlete	Event	Time	Rank	Time	Rank	Time	Rank
Vladislav Mustafin	50 m breaststroke	27.90	32	Did not advance			
Vladislav Mustafin	100 m breaststroke	1:02.48	47	Did not advance			
Khurshidjon Tursunov	50 m freestyle	DNS		Did not advance			
Khurshidjon Tursunov	100 m freestyle	DNS		Did not advance			

Women

Athlete	Event	Heat		Semifinal		Final	
Athlete	Event	Time	Rank	Time	Rank	Time	Rank
Natalya Kritinina	50 m freestyle	26.47	42	Did not advance			
Natalya Kritinina	100 m freestyle	59.19	53	Did not advance			
