= Artistic swimming at the 2019 World Aquatics Championships – Solo free routine =

Solo free routine at the 2019 World Aquatics Championships
- Venue: Yeomju Gymnasium
- Location: Gwangju, South Korea
- Dates: 15–17 July
- Competitors: 32 from 32 nations
- Winning points: 97.1333

Medalists
gold medal	Svetlana Romashina	Russia
silver medal	Ona Carbonell	Spain
bronze medal	Yukiko Inui	Japan

The Solo free routine competition at the 2019 World Aquatics Championships was held on 15 and 17 July 2019.

== Results ==
The preliminary round was started on 15 July at 11:00. The final was held on 17 July at 19:00.

Green denotes finalists

Rank	Diver	Nationality	Preliminary		Final	
Rank	Diver	Nationality	Points	Rank	Points	Rank
1st place, gold medalist(s)	Svetlana Romashina	Russia	96.4667	1	97.1333	1
2nd place, silver medalist(s)	Ona Carbonell	Spain	93.8333	2	94.5667	2
3rd place, bronze medalist(s)	Yukiko Inui	Japan	92.5667	3	93.2000	3
4	Marta Fiedina	Ukraine	92.0667	4	92.5667	4
5	Jacqueline Simoneau	Canada	90.4333	5	90.7000	5
6	Linda Cerruti	Italy	90.2333	6	90.4667	6
7	Evangelia Platanioti	Greece	88.4333	7	88.6667	7
8	Vasiliki Alexandri	Austria	86.7333	8	87.1667	8
9	Eve Planeix	France	86.4667	9	86.6667	9
10	Vasilina Khandoshka	Belarus	84.7000	10	85.0667	10
11	Kate Shortman	Great Britain	84.6000	11	84.7667	11
12	Anita Alvarez	United States	84.4667	12	84.7333	12
13	Lara Mechnig	Liechtenstein	82.4000	13	did not advance	
14	Vivienne Koch	Switzerland	82.1333	14	did not advance	
15	Marlene Bojer	Germany	79.7000	15	did not advance	
16	Lee Ri-young	South Korea	78.8000	16	did not advance	
17	Alžběta Dufková	Czech Republic	78.4333	17	did not advance	
18	Mónica Arango	Colombia	78.4000	18	did not advance	
19	Nada Daabousová	Slovakia	78.1667	19	did not advance	
20	Khonzodakhon Toshkhujaeva	Uzbekistan	76.8333	20	did not advance	
21	Jasmine Verbena	San Marino	76.2333	21	did not advance	
22	Aleksandra Atanasova	Bulgaria	76.1333	22	did not advance	
23	Nevena Dimitrijević	Serbia	75.4000	23	did not advance	
24	Kyra Hoevertsz	Aruba	74.6667	24	did not advance	
25	Camila Arregui	Argentina	74.6333	25	did not advance	
26	Defne Bakırcı	Turkey	74.5000	26	did not advance	
27	Natalija Ambrazaitė	Lithuania	73.8000	27	did not advance	
28	Aleksandra Filipiuk	Poland	73.6333	28	did not advance	
29	Gabriela Alpajón	Cuba	70.5667	29	did not advance	
30	Eva Morris	New Zealand	69.5667	30	did not advance	
31	Valeria Lizano	Costa Rica	67.1333	31	did not advance	
32	Zheng Zexuan	Macau	66.8000	32	did not advance	
