= Uzbekistan at the 2013 World Aquatics Championships =

- Flag of Uzbekistan
- World Aquatics code: UZB
- National federation: Uzbekistan Swimming Federation

in Barcelona, Spain
- Competitors: 21 in 3 sports
- Medals: Gold 0 Silver 0 Bronze 0 Total 0

World Aquatics Championships appearances
- 1994; 1998; 2001; 2003; 2005; 2007; 2009; 2011; 2013; 2015; 2017; 2019; 2022; 2023; 2024; 2025

Other related appearances
- Soviet Union (1973–1991)

Uzbekistan is competing at the 2013 World Aquatics Championships in Barcelona, Spain between 19 July and 4 August 2013.

== Swimming ==
Uzbekistani swimmers achieved qualifying standards in the following events (up to a maximum of 2 swimmers in each event at the A-standard entry time, and 1 at the B-standard):

Men

Athlete	Event	Heat		Semifinal		Final	
Athlete	Event	Time	Rank	Time	Rank	Time	Rank
Danil Bukin	100 m backstroke	56.63	32	Did not advance			
Danil Bukin	200 m backstroke	DSQ		Did not advance			
Aleksey Derlyugov	200 m individual medley	2:02.79	32	Did not advance			
Vladislav Mustafin	50 m breaststroke	28.97	49	Did not advance			
Vladislav Mustafin	100 m breaststroke	1:03.76	51	Did not advance			

Women

Athlete	Event	Heat		Semifinal		Final	
Athlete	Event	Time	Rank	Time	Rank	Time	Rank
Ranohon Amanova	200 m individual medley	2:18.60	35	Did not advance			
Ranohon Amanova	400 m individual medley	DNS		—N/a		Did not advance	
Yulduz Kuchkarova	50 m backstroke	29.84	37	Did not advance			
Yulduz Kuchkarova	100 m backstroke	1:03.54	35	Did not advance			

== Synchronized swimming ==
Uzbekistan has qualified the following synchronized swimmers.

Athlete	Event	Preliminaries		Final	
Athlete	Event	Points	Rank	Points	Rank
Anastasiya Ruzmetsova	Solo technical routine	74.000	25	Did not advance	
Yuliya Kim; Anastasiya Ruzmetsova	Duet free routine	71.250	28	Did not advance	
Anastasiya Ruzmetsova; Anastasia Zdraykovskaya	Duet technical routine	72.100	21	Did not advance	

== Water polo ==
=== Women's tournament ===
Team roster

- Elena Dukhanova
- Diana Dadabaeva
- Aleksandra Sarancha
- Angelina Djumalieva
- Evgeniya Ivanova
- Ekaterina Morozova
- Natalya Plyusova
- Anna Shcheglova
- Ramilya Halikova
- Adelina Zinurova
- Guzelya Hamitova
- Anna Plyusova
- Natalya Shlyonskaya

Group play

	Pld	W	D	L	GF	GA	GD	Pts
Russia	3	2	1	0	41	24	+17	5
Spain	3	2	0	1	40	23	+17	4
Netherlands	3	1	1	1	54	29	+25	3
Uzbekistan	3	0	0	3	13	72	−59	0

21 July 2013; 09:30	Report	Russia	22–6	Uzbekistan	Piscines Bernat Picornell, Barcelona; Attendance: 225; Referees: Terepenka (CAN), Makita (JPN)
21 July 2013; 09:30	Report	Score by quarters: 5–1, 6–1, 5–2, 6–2			Piscines Bernat Picornell, Barcelona; Attendance: 225; Referees: Terepenka (CAN), Makita (JPN)
21 July 2013; 09:30	Report	Prokofyeva 6	Goals	three players 2	Piscines Bernat Picornell, Barcelona; Attendance: 225; Referees: Terepenka (CAN), Makita (JPN)

23 July 2013; 20:10	Report	Uzbekistan	3–30	Netherlands	Piscines Bernat Picornell, Barcelona; Attendance: 500; Referees: Makita (JPN), Moller (ARG)
23 July 2013; 20:10	Report	Score by quarters: 1–7, 0–9, 1–6, 1–8			Piscines Bernat Picornell, Barcelona; Attendance: 500; Referees: Makita (JPN), Moller (ARG)
23 July 2013; 20:10	Report	three players 1	Goals	Klaassen 6	Piscines Bernat Picornell, Barcelona; Attendance: 500; Referees: Makita (JPN), Moller (ARG)

25 July 2013; 21:30	Report	Spain	20–4	Uzbekistan	Piscines Bernat Picornell, Barcelona; Attendance: 800; Referees: Vogel (HUN), Drury (USA)
25 July 2013; 21:30	Report	Score by quarters: 8–1, 3–0, 6–0, 3–3			Piscines Bernat Picornell, Barcelona; Attendance: 800; Referees: Vogel (HUN), Drury (USA)
25 July 2013; 21:30	Report	Blas 6	Goals	Plyusova, Halikova 2	Piscines Bernat Picornell, Barcelona; Attendance: 800; Referees: Vogel (HUN), Drury (USA)

Round of 16

27 July 2013; 10:50	Report	Australia	25–2	Uzbekistan	Piscines Bernat Picornell, Barcelona; Attendance: 100; Referees: Moller (ARG), Littlejohn (GBR)
27 July 2013; 10:50	Report	Score by quarters: 6–0, 5–1, 5–1, 9–0			Piscines Bernat Picornell, Barcelona; Attendance: 100; Referees: Moller (ARG), Littlejohn (GBR)
27 July 2013; 10:50	Report	Buckling 6	Goals	Sarancha 2	Piscines Bernat Picornell, Barcelona; Attendance: 100; Referees: Moller (ARG), Littlejohn (GBR)
