= Artistic swimming at the 2019 World Aquatics Championships – Solo technical routine =

Solo technical routine at the 2019 World Aquatics Championships
- Venue: Yeomju Gymnasium
- Location: Gwangju, South Korea
- Dates: 12–13 July
- Competitors: 28 from 28 nations
- Winning points: 95.0023

Medalists
gold medal	Svetlana Kolesnichenko	Russia
silver medal	Ona Carbonell	Spain
bronze medal	Yukiko Inui	Japan

The Solo technical routine competition at the 2019 World Aquatics Championships was held on 12 and 13 July 2019.

== Results ==
The preliminary round was started on 12 July at 11:00. The final was held on 13 July at 19:00.

Green denotes finalists

Rank	Diver	Nationality	Preliminary		Final	
Rank	Diver	Nationality	Points	Rank	Points	Rank
1st place, gold medalist(s)	Svetlana Kolesnichenko	Russia	94.1126	1	95.0023	1
2nd place, silver medalist(s)	Ona Carbonell	Spain	91.8259	2	92.5002	2
3rd place, bronze medalist(s)	Yukiko Inui	Japan	91.7284	3	92.3084	3
4	Marta Fiedina	Ukraine	90.6797	4	91.3014	4
5	Jacqueline Simoneau	Canada	89.1527	5	89.2932	5
6	Linda Cerruti	Italy	87.8093	6	88.0378	6
7	Evangelia Platanioti	Greece	86.1571	7	86.2921	7
8	Vasiliki Alexandri	Austria	85.3434	8	85.6098	8
9	Vasilina Khandoshka	Belarus	84.4333	9	84.4867	9
10	Kate Shortman	Great Britain	83.4981	10	83.9548	10
11	Lara Mechnig	Liechtenstein	81.3678	11	81.7811	11
12	Noemi Peschl	Switzerland	81.0914	12	81.6587	12
13	Mónica Arango	Colombia	78.8804	13	did not advance	
14	Marlene Bojer	Germany	78.4601	14	did not advance	
15	Lee Ri-young	South Korea	77.4921	15	did not advance	
16	Khonzodakhon Toshkhujaeva	Uzbekistan	76.1548	16	did not advance	
17	Alžběta Dufková	Czech Republic	75.8189	17	did not advance	
18	Aleksandra Atanasova	Bulgaria	75.4207	18	did not advance	
19	Jasmine Zonzini	San Marino	73.8142	19	did not advance	
20	Kyra Hoevertsz	Aruba	73.4699	20	did not advance	
21	Defne Bakırcı	Turkey	73.2867	21	did not advance	
22	Nada Daabousová	Slovakia	71.3210	22	did not advance	
23	Gabriela Alpajón	Cuba	70.3457	23	did not advance	
24	Natalija Ambrazaitė	Lithuania	69.8135	24	did not advance	
25	Wiktoria Grabowska	Poland	69.2711	25	did not advance	
26	Trinidad López	Argentina	68.0890	26	did not advance	
27	Natalia Jenkins	Costa Rica	67.8807	27	did not advance	
28	Chau Cheng Han	Macau	62.3529	28	did not advance	
