= Uzbekistan at the 2024 World Aquatics Championships =

- Flag of Uzbekistan
- FINA code: UZB
- National federation: Uzbekistan Swimming Federation

in Doha, Qatar
- Competitors: 6 in 3 sports
- Medals: Gold 0 Silver 0 Bronze 0 Total 0

World Aquatics Championships appearances
- 1994; 1998; 2001; 2003; 2005; 2007; 2009; 2011; 2013; 2015; 2017; 2019; 2022; 2023; 2024

Other related appearances
- Soviet Union (1973–1991)

Uzbekistan competed at the 2024 World Aquatics Championships in Doha, Qatar from 2 to 18 February.

== Competitors ==
The following is the list of competitors in the Championships.

Sport	Men	Women	Total
Artistic swimming	0	2	2
Diving	2	0	2
Swimming	2	0	2
Total	4	2	6

== Artistic swimming ==
Women

Athlete	Event	Preliminaries		Final	
Athlete	Event	Points	Rank	Points	Rank
Diana Onkes; Ziyodakhon Toshkhujaeva	Duet technical routine	223.8500	11 Q	203.4817	12
Diana Onkes; Ziyodakhon Toshkhujaeva	Duet free routine	140.4958	30	Did not advance	

== Diving ==
Men

Athlete	Event	Preliminaries		Semifinals		Final	
Athlete	Event	Points	Rank	Points	Rank	Points	Rank
Vyacheslav Kachanov	1 m springboard	258.45	30	—		Did not advance	
Vyacheslav Kachanov	3 m springboard	279.55	52	Did not advance			
Igor Myalin	10 m platform	377.85	14 Q	415.80	7 Q	379.80	12
Vyacheslav Kachanov; Igor Myalin	3 m synchro springboard	—				310.62	21

== Swimming ==
Uzbekistan entered 2 swimmers.

Men

Athlete	Event	Heat		Semifinal		Final	
Athlete	Event	Time	Rank	Time	Rank	Time	Rank
Ilia Sibirtsev	400 metre freestyle	3:50.09 NR	26	—		Did not advance	
Ilia Sibirtsev	800 metre freestyle	7:53.87 NR	21	—		Did not advance	
Eldor Usmonov	50 metre butterfly	23.54	19	Did not advance			
Eldor Usmonov	100 metre butterfly	52.83	23	Did not advance			
