= Uzbekistan at the 2023 World Aquatics Championships =

- Flag of Uzbekistan
- FINA code: UZB
- National federation: Uzbekistan Swimming Federation
- Website: aquatics.uz

in Fukuoka, Japan
- Competitors: 8 in 2 sports
- Medals: Gold 0 Silver 0 Bronze 0 Total 0

World Aquatics Championships appearances
- 1994; 1998; 2001; 2003; 2005; 2007; 2009; 2011; 2013; 2015; 2017; 2019; 2022; 2023; 2024

Other related appearances
- Soviet Union (1973–1991)

Uzbekistan competed at the 2023 World Aquatics Championships in Fukuoka, Japan from 14 to 30 July.

== Artistic swimming ==
Uzbekistan entered 4 artistic swimmers.

Women

Athlete	Event	Preliminaries		Final	
Athlete	Event	Points	Rank	Points	Rank
Gulsanam Bukina	Solo technical routine	166.3867	20	did not advance	
Anna Vashchenko	Solo free routine	108.4708	27	did not advance	
Diana Onkes; Ziyodakhon Toshkhujaeva	Duet technical routine	182.8649	23	did not advance	
Diana Onkes; Ziyodakhon Toshkhujaeva	Duet free routine	159.7541	17	did not advance	

== Open water swimming ==
Uzbekistan entered 4 open water swimmers.

Men

Athlete	Event	Time	Rank
Nikita Kornilov	Men's 5 km	1:06:22.4	61
Nikita Kornilov	Men's 10 km	2:16:01.9	64
Vyacheslav Shkretov	Men's 5 km	DNF	

Women

Athlete	Event	Time	Rank
Parizoda Iskandarova	Women's 5 km	DSQ	
Parizoda Iskandarova	Women's 10 km	OTL	
Anastasiya Zelinskaya	Women's 5 km	1:07:15.9	50
Anastasiya Zelinskaya	Women's 10 km	2:19:13.5	50

Mixed

Athlete	Event	Time	Rank
Parizoda Iskandarova; Nikita Kornilov; Vyacheslav Shkretov; Anastasiya Zelinskaya	Team relay	1:26:29.2	21
