= San Marino at the 2015 World Aquatics Championships =

- Flag of San Marino
- World Aquatics code: SMR
- National federation: Federazione Sammarinese Nuoto
- Website: www.fsn.sm

in Kazan, Russia
- Competitors: 2 in 1 sport
- Medals: Gold 0 Silver 0 Bronze 0 Total 0

World Aquatics Championships appearances
- 1994; 1998; 2001; 2003; 2005; 2007; 2009; 2011; 2013; 2015; 2017; 2019; 2022; 2023; 2024; 2025

San Marino competed at the 2015 World Aquatics Championships in Kazan, Russia from 24 July to 9 August 2015.

== Swimming ==
Sammarinese swimmers have achieved qualifying standards in the following events (up to a maximum of 2 swimmers in each event at the A-standard entry time, and 1 at the B-standard):

Women

Athlete	Event	Heat		Semifinal		Final	
Athlete	Event	Time	Rank	Time	Rank	Time	Rank
Beatrice Felici	50 m freestyle	28.15	75	did not advance			
Beatrice Felici	100 m freestyle	59.51	65	did not advance			
Elena Giovannini	200 m freestyle	2:07.84	53	did not advance			
Elena Giovannini	400 m freestyle	4:29.40	42	—N/a		did not advance	
