= Khonzodakhon Toshkhujaeva =

Uzbekistani synchronized swimmer (born 2000)

Personal information
- Nationality: Uzbekistani
- Born: 3 March 2003 (age 22)

Sport
- Country: Uzbekistan
- Sport: Synchronised swimming

Khonzodakhon Toshkhujaeva (born 3 March 2000) is an Uzbekistani synchronized swimmer. She represented Uzbekistan at the 2017 World Aquatics Championships in Budapest, Hungary and at the 2019 World Aquatics Championships in Gwangju, South Korea.

In 2018, she finished in 5th place in the women's team event at the Asian Games held in Jakarta, Indonesia.

At the 2019 World Aquatics Championships she finished in 16th place in the preliminary round in the solo technical routine. She finished in 20th place in the preliminary round in the solo free routine.
