= San Marino at the 2024 World Aquatics Championships =

- Flag of San Marino
- FINA code: SMR
- National federation: Federazione Sammarinese Nuoto
- Website: www.fsn.sm

in Doha, Qatar
- Competitors: 3 in 2 sports

World Aquatics Championships appearances
- 1994; 1998; 2001; 2003; 2005; 2007; 2009; 2011; 2013; 2015; 2017; 2019; 2022; 2023; 2024

San Marino competed at the 2024 World Aquatics Championships in Doha, Qatar from 2 to 18 February.

== Athletes by discipline ==
The following is the list of number of competitors participating at the Championships per discipline.

Sport	Men	Women	Total
Artistic swimming	0	1	1
Swimming	2	0	2
Total	2	1	3

== Artistic swimming ==
Women

Athlete	Event	Preliminaries		Final	
Athlete	Event	Points	Rank	Points	Rank
Jasmine Verbena	Solo technical routine	217.9267	13	Did not advance	
Jasmine Verbena	Solo free routine	207.0645	9 Q	207.5209	7

== Swimming ==
Men

Athlete	Event	Heat		Semifinal		Final	
Athlete	Event	Time	Rank	Time	Rank	Time	Rank
Giacomo Casadei	100 metre breaststroke	1:04.11	51	Did not advance			
Giacomo Casadei	200 metre breaststroke	2:19.60	27	Did not advance			
Loris Bianchi	400 metre freestyle	3:58.47	38	—		Did not advance	
Loris Bianchi	800 metre freestyle	8:17.70 NR	37	—		Did not advance	
