= Artistic swimming at the 2018 Asian Games – Women's duet =

Women's duet at the 2018 Asian Games
- Venue: Gelora Bung Karno Aquatic Stadium
- Date: 27–28 August 2018
- Competitors: 26 from 11 nations

Medalists
gold medal	Jiang Tingting; Jiang Wenwen	China
silver medal	Yukiko Inui; Megumu Yoshida	Japan
bronze medal	Alexandra Nemich; Yekaterina Nemich	Kazakhstan

The Women's duet event at the 2018 Asian Games took place from 27 to 28 August 2018 at the Gelora Bung Karno Aquatic Stadium.

== Schedule ==
All times are Western Indonesia Time (UTC+07:00)

Date	Time	Event
Monday, 27 August 2018	10:00	Technical routine
Tuesday, 28 August 2018	10:00	Free routine

== Results ==
Legend

- FR — Reserve in free
- RR — Reserve in technical and free
- TR — Reserve in technical

Rank	Team	Technical	Free	Total
1st place, gold medalist(s)	China (CHN); Jiang Tingting; Jiang Wenwen	92.4101	94.1000	186.5101
2nd place, silver medalist(s)	Japan (JPN); Yukiko Inui; Megumu Yoshida	90.2363	92.1000	182.3363
3rd place, bronze medalist(s)	Kazakhstan (KAZ); Alexandra Nemich; Yekaterina Nemich	84.7178	86.1667	170.8845
4	North Korea (PRK); Jang Hyon-ok; Min Hae-yon	82.8094	83.8000	166.6094
5	Uzbekistan (UZB); Anna Eltisheva; Anastasiya Morozova; Nafisa Shomirzaeva (RR)	77.7847	78.1333	155.9180
6	South Korea (KOR); Choi Jung-yeon; Lee Ri-young (TR); Uhm Ji-wan (FR)	75.8941	78.8000	154.6941
7	Singapore (SGP); Debbie Soh; Rachel Thean	73.5593	76.4000	149.9593
8	Malaysia (MAS); Foong Yan Nie (FR); Gan Hua Wei; Zylane Lee (TR)	73.2032	75.1333	148.3365
9	Macau (MAC); Au Ieong Sin Ieng (RR); Chau Cheng Han; Lo Wai Lam	68.5963	69.9000	138.4963
10	Hong Kong (HKG); Haruka Kawazoe; Christie Poon	65.6146	67.7000	133.3146
11	Indonesia (INA); Andriani Shintya Ardhana; Naima Syeeda Sharita	62.6657	65.9667	128.6324
