= San Marino at the 2019 World Aquatics Championships =

- Flag of San Marino
- FINA code: SMR
- National federation: Federazione Sammarinese Nuoto
- Website: www.fsn.sm

in Gwangju, South Korea
- Medals: Gold 0 Silver 0 Bronze 0 Total 0

World Aquatics Championships appearances
- 1994; 1998; 2001; 2003; 2005; 2007; 2009; 2011; 2013; 2015; 2017; 2019; 2022; 2023; 2024

San Marino competed at the 2019 World Aquatics Championships in Gwangju, South Korea from 12 to 28 July.

== Artistic swimming ==
San Marino entered two artistic swimmers.

Women

Athlete	Event	Preliminaries		Final	
Athlete	Event	Points	Rank	Points	Rank
Jasmine Zonzini	Solo technical routine	73.8142	19	did not advance	
Jasmine Zonzini	Solo free routine	76.2333	21	did not advance	
Jasmine Verbena; Jasmine Zonzini	Duet technical routine	74.3178	33	did not advance	
Jasmine Verbena; Jasmine Zonzini	Duet free routine	76.7000	26	did not advance	

== Swimming ==
San Marino entered two swimmers.

Men

Athlete	Event	Heat		Semifinal		Final	
Athlete	Event	Time	Rank	Time	Rank	Time	Rank
Giacomo Casadei	50 m breaststroke	30.13	=58	did not advance			
Giacomo Casadei	100 m breaststroke	1:05.96	69	did not advance			

Women

Athlete	Event	Heat		Final	
Athlete	Event	Time	Rank	Time	Rank
Arianna Valloni	800 m freestyle	8:52.85	29	did not advance	
Arianna Valloni	1500 m freestyle	16:56.98	24	did not advance	
