= Georgia Vasilopoulou =

Greek synchronized swimmer

Personal information
- Born: 13 November 2001 (age 24) Volos, Greece
- Height: 172 cm (5 ft 8 in)
- Weight: 62 kg (137 lb)

Sport
- Sport: Swimming
- Strokes: Synchronised swimming
Medal record
Women's artistic swimming
Representing Greece
LEN European Aquatics Championships
Silver medal – second place	2020 Budapest	Combination Routine
FINA Artistic Swimming World Series
Bronze medal – third place	2018	Duet Free
Bronze medal – third place	2019	Team Technical

Georgia Vasilopoulou (Greek: Γεωργία Βασιλοπούλου, born 13 November 2001) is a Greek synchronized swimmer. She won a silver medal in artistic swimming at the 2020 European Aquatics Championships as a member of the Greek team in the Combination Routine event. Vasilopoulou earned bronze medals at the FINA Artistic Swimming World Series in the Duet Free event (2018) and Team Technical event (2019) and also competed for Greece at the 2019 World Aquatics Championships.

Vasilopoulou was a member of the Greek team which finished in 3rd place at the 2020 FINA Olympic Games Artistic Swimming Qualification Tournament. That team would have competed at the 2020 Summer Olympics, but was disqualified due to a swimmer testing positive for COVID-19.
