= Artistic swimming at the 2023 World Aquatics Championships – Women's solo free routine =

Women's solo free routine at the 2023 World Aquatics Championships
- Venue: Marine Messe Fukuoka
- Location: Fukuoka, Japan
- Dates: 17 July (preliminary); 19 July (final)
- Competitors: 29 from 29 nations
- Winning points: 254.6062

Medalists
gold medal	Yukiko Inui	Japan
silver medal	Vasiliki Alexandri	Austria
bronze medal	Kate Shortman	Great Britain

The women's solo free routine was an artistic swimming competition at the 2023 World Aquatics Championships was held on 17 and 19 July 2023.

== Results ==
The preliminary round was started on 17 July at 09:00. The final was held on 19 July at 19:30.

Green denotes finalists

Rank	Swimmer	Nationality	Preliminary		Final	
Rank	Swimmer	Nationality	Points	Rank	Points	Rank
1st place, gold medalist(s)	Yukiko Inui	Japan	253.1853	1	254.6062	1
2nd place, silver medalist(s)	Vasiliki Alexandri	Austria	179.2834	6	229.3251	2
3rd place, bronze medalist(s)	Kate Shortman	Great Britain	213.8417	2	219.9542	3
4	Audrey Lamothe	Canada	167.3625	8	207.4480	4
5	Evangelia Platanioti	Greece	199.4834	3	205.5459	5
6	Hur Yoon-seo	South Korea	185.9500	4	186.6167	6
7	Jasmine Verbena	San Marino	182.3520	5	186.4918	7
8	Iris Tió	Spain	174.0208	7	178.9146	8
9	Laelys Alavez	France	150.4520	12	175.8146	9
10	Ece Üngör	Turkey	153.9521	10	160.4291	10
11	Matea Butorac	Croatia	166.7458	9	151.1520	11
12	Kyra Hoevertsz	Aruba	153.2980	11	136.4083	12
13	Mari Alavidze	Georgia	148.3376	13	Did not advance	
14	Sandra Freund	Sweden	144.1728	14	Did not advance	
15	Karina Magrupova	Kazakhstan	137.0083	15	Did not advance	
16	Viktória Reichová	Slovakia	135.4375	16	Did not advance	
17	Patrawee Chayawararak	Thailand	135.0437	17	Did not advance	
18	Aleksandra Atanasova	Bulgaria	132.9146	18	Did not advance	
19	Nika Seljak	Slovenia	128.8188	19	Did not advance	
20	Ana Culic	Malta	128.6814	20	Did not advance	
21	Susanna Pedotti	Italy	122.6167	21	Did not advance	
22	Skye MacDonald	South Africa	122.4375	22	Did not advance	
23	Marlene Bojer	Germany	121.9084	23	Did not advance	
24	Karolína Klusková	Czech Republic	115.0375	24	Did not advance	
25	Jennah Hafsi	Morocco	114.3521	25	Did not advance	
26	Alexandra Mansaré-Traoré	Guinea	109.9249	26	Did not advance	
27	Anna Vashchenko	Uzbekistan	108.4708	27	Did not advance	
28	Gabriela Alpajón	Cuba	107.2771	28	Did not advance	
29	Anna Mitinian	Costa Rica	96.0500	29	Did not advance	
