= San Marino at the 2022 World Aquatics Championships =

- Flag of San Marino
- FINA code: SMR
- National federation: Federazione Sammarinese Nuoto
- Website: www.fsn.sm

in Budapest, Hungary
- Competitors: 5 in 3 sports
- Medals: Gold 0 Silver 0 Bronze 0 Total 0

World Aquatics Championships appearances
- 1994; 1998; 2001; 2003; 2005; 2007; 2009; 2011; 2013; 2015; 2017; 2019; 2022; 2023; 2024

San Marino competed at the 2022 World Aquatics Championships in Budapest, Hungary from 17 June to 3 July.

== Artistic swimming ==
San Marino entered two artistic swimmers.

Women

| Athlete | Event | Preliminaries | | Final | |
| Athlete | Event | Points | Rank | Points | Rank |
|---|---|---|---|---|---|
| Jasmine Verbena | Solo technical routine | 78.9977 | 15 | did not advance | |
| Jasmine Verbena | Solo free routine | 80.8667 | 13 | did not advance | |
| Jasmine Verbena; Jasmine Zonzini | Duet technical routine | 78.7143 | 14 | did not advance | |
| Jasmine Verbena; Jasmine Zonzini | Duet free routine | 79.1333 | 17 | did not advance | |

== Open water swimming ==
San Marino qualified one female open water swimmer.

Women

| Athlete | Event | Time | Rank |
|---|---|---|---|
| Arianna Valloni | 5 km | 1:03:38.5 | 35 |
| Arianna Valloni | 10 km | 2:10:43.3 | 42 |

== Swimming ==
San Marino entered three swimmers.

Men

| Athlete | Event | Heat | | Semifinal | | Final | |
| Athlete | Event | Time | Rank | Time | Rank | Time | Rank |
|---|---|---|---|---|---|---|---|
| Loris Bianchi | 400 m freestyle | 4:04.57 | 38 | — | | did not advance | |
| Loris Bianchi | 800 m freestyle | 8:27.93 | 27 | — | | did not advance | |
| Giacomo Casadei | 50 m breaststroke | 30.07 | 48 | did not advance | | | |
| Giacomo Casadei | 100 m breaststroke | 1:05.17 | 51 | did not advance | | | |

Women

| Athlete | Event | Heat | | Semifinal | | Final | |
| Athlete | Event | Time | Rank | Time | Rank | Time | Rank |
|---|---|---|---|---|---|---|---|
| Arianna Valloni | 800 m freestyle | 8:59.95 | 19 | — | | did not advance | |
