= Artistic swimming at the 2023 European Games – Free routine combination =

Free routine combination at the 2023 European Games
- Venue: Oswiecim
- Dates: 23 June
- Competitors: 30 from 3 nations
- Winning points: 248.6083

Medalists
gold medal	Eden Blecher; Shelly Bobritsky; Maya Dorf; Noy Gazala; Catherine Kunin; Aya Mazor; Nikol Nahshonov; Ariel Nassee; Neta Rubichek; Shani Sharaizin	Israel
silver medal	Klara Bleyer; Amelie Blumenthal Haz; Marlene Bojer; Maria Denisov; Solene Guisard; Daria Martens; Susana Rovner; Frithjof Seidel; Daria Tonn; Michelle Zimmer	Germany
bronze medal	Derin Aralp; Duru Kanberoğlu; Ayda Salepçioğlu; Ece Sokullu; Nil Talu; Selin Telci; Ece Üngör; Dila Yildiz; Esmanur Yirmibeş; İsra Yüksel	Turkey

The Free routine combination competition of the 2023 European Games was held on 23 June 2023 in Oswiecim, Poland. For the first time male competitors took part in the sport at this level.

== Results ==
All three entered teams competed in the final. There was no preliminary round.

Rank	Nation	D	E	A	P	Total
1st place, gold medalist(s)	Israel; Eden Blecher; Shelly Bobritsky; Maya Dorf; Noy Gazala; Catherine Kunin; Aya Mazor; Nikol Nahshonov; Ariel Nassee; Neta Rubichek; Shani Sharaizin	35.000	137.1583	111.4500	-5.0	248.6083
2nd place, silver medalist(s)	Germany; Klara Bleyer; Amelie Blumenthal Haz; Marlene Bojer; Maria Denisov; Solene Guisard; Daria Martens; Susana Rovner; Frithjof Seidel; Daria Tonn; Michelle Zimmer	15.755	55.3205	108.0000	-5.6	163.3205
3rd place, bronze medalist(s)	Turkey; Derin Aralp; Duru Kanberoğlu; Ayda Salepçioğlu; Ece Sokullu; Nil Talu; Selin Telci; Ece Üngör; Dila Yildiz; Esmanur Yirmibeş; İsra Yüksel	15.700	43.2999	92.5000	-12.5	135.7999
