= Mayu Tsukamoto =

Japanese synchronized swimmer

Personal information
- Nationality: Japan
- Born: 15 April 1997 (age 29)

Sport
- Sport: Synchronized swimming
- Event: Women's team
Medal record
Asian Games
Silver medal – second place	2018 Jakarta–Palembang	Team

Mayu Tsukamoto (born 15 April 1997) is a Japanese synchronized swimmer. She competed in the 2020 Summer Olympics.

She also participated at the 2018 Asian Games and won a silver medal in the team event.
