= Greece at the 2019 World Aquatics Championships =

- Flag of Greece
- World Aquatics code: GRE
- National federation: Hellenic Swimming Federation
- Website: koe.org.gr (in Greek)

in Gwangju, South Korea
- Competitors: 49 in 5 sports
- Medals Ranked 18th: Gold 0 Silver 1 Bronze 0 Total 1

World Aquatics Championships appearances
- 1973; 1975; 1978; 1982; 1986; 1991; 1994; 1998; 2001; 2003; 2005; 2007; 2009; 2011; 2013; 2015; 2017; 2019; 2022; 2023; 2024; 2025

Greece competed at the 2019 World Aquatics Championships in Gwangju, South Korea from 12 to 28 July.

== Medalists ==
Medal	Name	Sport	Event	Date
Silver	Kristian Golomeev	Swimming	Men's 50 metre freestyle	July 27

== Artistic swimming ==
Greece's artistic swimming team consisted of 12 athletes (12 female).

Women

Athlete	Event	Preliminaries		Final	
Athlete	Event	Points	Rank	Points	Rank
Evangelia Platanioti	Solo technical routine	86.1571	7 Q	86.2921	7
Evangelia Platanioti	Solo free routine	88.4333	7 Q	88.6667	7
Evangelia Papazoglou; Evangelia Platanioti	Duet technical routine	85.6252	10 Q	86.4975	9
Evangelia Papazoglou; Evangelia Platanioti	Duet free routine	87.8667	8 Q	87.3333	9
Eleni Fragaki; Krystalenia Gialama; Maria Karapanagiotou; Anastasia Koutselini; Evangelia Papazoglou; Evangelia Platanioti; Georgia Vasilopoulou; Violeta Zouzouni; Vasiliki Kofidi (R); Olga Kourgiantaki (R)	Team technical routine	86.0075	8 Q	87.0863	8
Eleni Fragaki; Krystalenia Gialama; Maria Karapanagiotou; Anastasia Koutselini; Evangelia Papazoglou; Evangelia Platanioti; Georgia Vasilopoulou; Violeta Zouzouni; Vasiliki Kofidi (R); Olga Kourgiantaki (R)	Team free routine	87.8000	8 Q	88.333	8
Eleni Fragaki; Krystalenia Gialama; Danai Kariori; Vasiliki Kofidi; Olga Kourgiantaki; Anastasia Koutselini; Evangelia Papazoglou; Evangelia Platanioti; Georgia Vasilopoulou; Violeta Zouzouni; Maria Karapanagiotou (R); Pinelopi Karamesiou (R)	Free routine combination	88.1333	6 Q	87.6000	6

Legend: (R) = Reserve Athlete

== Diving ==
Greek divers qualified for the individual spots at the World Championships.

Men

Athlete	Event	Preliminaries		Semifinals		Final	
Athlete	Event	Points	Rank	Points	Rank	Points	Rank
Nikolaos Molvalis	10 m platform	346.70	23	did not advance			
Athanasios Tsirikos	10 m platform	286.20	43	did not advance			
Nikolaos Molvalis; Athanasios Tsirikos	Synchronized 10 m platform	332.64	14	—N/a		did not advance	

== Open water swimming ==
Greece qualified one male and one female open water swimmers.

Men

Athlete	Event	Time	Rank
Athanasios Kynigakis	Men's 10 km	1:48:15.4	13

Women

Athlete	Event	Time	Rank
Kalliopi Araouzou	Women's 5 km	58:17.2	19
Kalliopi Araouzou	Women's 10 km	2:00:30.3	37

== Swimming ==
Greek swimmers have achieved qualifying standards in the following events (up to a maximum of 2 swimmers in each event at the A-standard entry time, and 1 at the B-standard):

Men

Athlete	Event	Heat		Semifinal		Final	
Athlete	Event	Time	Rank	Time	Rank	Time	Rank
Apostolos Christou	50 m backstroke	25.00	9 Q	24.86	8 Q	24.75	8
Apostolos Christou	100 m backstroke	53.82	12 Q	53.56	10	did not advance	
Apostolos Christou	200 m backstroke	1:59.42	24	did not advance			
Ioannis Georgarakis	100 m freestyle	50.48	55	did not advance			
Kristian Golomeev	50 m freestyle	21.80	6 Q	21.60	4 Q	21.45	2nd place, silver medalist(s)
Kristian Golomeev	50 m butterfly	23.51	13 Q	23.29	9	did not advance	
Dimitrios Negris	400 m freestyle	3:50.81	16	—N/a		did not advance	
Dimitrios Negris	800 m freestyle	7:58.99	22	—N/a		did not advance	
Dimitrios Negris	1500 m freestyle	15:25.71	27	—N/a		did not advance	
Andreas Vazaios	100 m butterfly	53.41	29	did not advance			
Andreas Vazaios	200 m individual medley	1:59.80	17	did not advance			
Andreas Vazaios; Kristian Golomeev; Ioannis Georgarakis; Apostolos Christou	4 × 100 m freestyle relay	3:14.44	10	—N/a		did not advance	

Women

Athlete	Event	Heat		Semifinal		Final	
Athlete	Event	Time	Rank	Time	Rank	Time	Rank
Theodora Drakou	50 m freestyle	25.19	21	did not advance			
Theodora Drakou	100 m freestyle	55.50	30	did not advance			
Theodora Drakou	50 m backstroke	28.48	21	did not advance			
Anna Ntountounaki	50 m butterfly	26.26	15 Q	26.31	15	did not advance	
Anna Ntountounaki	100 m butterfly	57.88	9 Q	57.99	15	did not advance	
Anna Ntountounaki	200 m butterfly	2:13.83	25	did not advance			

== Water polo ==
Greece qualified both a men's and women's teams.

=== Men's tournament ===
Team roster

- Emmanouil Zerdevas
- Konstantinos Galanidis
- Dimitrios Skoumpakis
- Konstantinos Genidounias
- Marios Kapotsis
- Ioannis Fountoulis (C)
- Georgios Dervisis
- Alexandros Papanastasiou
- Stylianos Argyropoulos
- Konstantinos Mourikis
- Christodoulos Kolomvos
- Alexandros Gounas
- Angelos Vlachopoulos
- Coach: Theodoros Vlachos

Group A

Pos	Team	Pld	W	D	L	GF	GA	GD	Pts	Qualification
1	Serbia	3	2	1	0	41	15	+26	5	Quarterfinals
2	Montenegro	3	1	2	0	44	26	+18	4	Playoffs
3	Greece	3	1	1	1	39	22	+17	3	Playoffs
4	South Korea (H)	3	0	0	3	11	72	−61	0	

Source: Sportresult
Rules for classification: 1) points; 2) head-to-head points; 3) head-to-head goal difference; 4) head-to-head number of goals scored; 5) Goal difference.
(H) Hosts

15 July 2019; 09:50	Report	South Korea	3–26	Greece	Nambu University Aquatics Center, Gwangju; Referees: Jeremy Cheng (SGP), Gabriella Várkonyi (HUN)
15 July 2019; 09:50	Report	Score by quarters: 0–7, 0–7, 1–3, 2–9			Nambu University Aquatics Center, Gwangju; Referees: Jeremy Cheng (SGP), Gabriella Várkonyi (HUN)
15 July 2019; 09:50	Report	Dong-hyeok 2	Goals	three players 4	Nambu University Aquatics Center, Gwangju; Referees: Jeremy Cheng (SGP), Gabriella Várkonyi (HUN)

17 July 2019; 19:10	Report	Greece	10–10	Montenegro	Nambu University Aquatics Center, Gwangju; Referees: Adrian Alexandrescu (ROU), Alessandro Severo (ITA)
17 July 2019; 19:10	Report	Score by quarters: 3–3, 1–2, 4–4, 2–1			Nambu University Aquatics Center, Gwangju; Referees: Adrian Alexandrescu (ROU), Alessandro Severo (ITA)
17 July 2019; 19:10	Report	three players 2	Goals	Janović 3	Nambu University Aquatics Center, Gwangju; Referees: Adrian Alexandrescu (ROU), Alessandro Severo (ITA)

19 July 2019; 16:30	Report	Serbia	9–3	Greece	Nambu University Aquatics Center, Gwangju; Referees: Boris Margeta (SLO), Germán Moller (ARG)
19 July 2019; 16:30	Report	Score by quarters: 3–1, 3–2, 0–0, 3–0			Nambu University Aquatics Center, Gwangju; Referees: Boris Margeta (SLO), Germán Moller (ARG)
19 July 2019; 16:30	Report	Mandić 4	Goals	three players 1	Nambu University Aquatics Center, Gwangju; Referees: Boris Margeta (SLO), Germán Moller (ARG)

Playoffs

21 July 2019; 15:30	Report	Greece	11–9	United States	Nambu University Aquatics Center, Gwangju; Referees: Germán Moller (ARG), Sebastien Dervieux (FRA)
21 July 2019; 15:30	Report	Score by quarters: 3–4, 3–2, 2–2, 3–1			Nambu University Aquatics Center, Gwangju; Referees: Germán Moller (ARG), Sebastien Dervieux (FRA)
21 July 2019; 15:30	Report	Genidounias 4	Goals	three players 2	Nambu University Aquatics Center, Gwangju; Referees: Germán Moller (ARG), Sebastien Dervieux (FRA)

Quarterfinals

23 July 2019; 18:30	Report	Italy	7–6	Greece	Nambu University Aquatics Center, Gwangju; Referees: Boris Margeta (SLO), Adrian Alexandrescu (ROU)
23 July 2019; 18:30	Report	Score by quarters: 2-2, 2–1, 2–3, 1–0			Nambu University Aquatics Center, Gwangju; Referees: Boris Margeta (SLO), Adrian Alexandrescu (ROU)
23 July 2019; 18:30	Report	Di Fulvio, Luongo 2	Goals	Genidounias, Gounas 2	Nambu University Aquatics Center, Gwangju; Referees: Boris Margeta (SLO), Adrian Alexandrescu (ROU)

5th–8th place semifinals

25 July 2019; 15:30	Report	Australia	9–8	Greece	Nambu University Aquatics Center, Gwangju; Referees: Michael Goldenberg (USA), Nenad Peris (CRO)
25 July 2019; 15:30	Report	Score by quarters: 3–2, 2–3, 3–3, 1–0			Nambu University Aquatics Center, Gwangju; Referees: Michael Goldenberg (USA), Nenad Peris (CRO)
25 July 2019; 15:30	Report	Kayes 3	Goals	Kapotsis, Kolomvos 2	Nambu University Aquatics Center, Gwangju; Referees: Michael Goldenberg (USA), Nenad Peris (CRO)

Seventh place game

27 July 2019; 14:00	Report	Germany	6–11	Greece	Nambu University Aquatics Center, Gwangju; Referees: Stanko Ivanovski (MNE), Nenad Peris (CRO)
27 July 2019; 14:00	Report	Score by quarters: 2–1, 2–3, 0–2, 2–5			Nambu University Aquatics Center, Gwangju; Referees: Stanko Ivanovski (MNE), Nenad Peris (CRO)
27 July 2019; 14:00	Report	Stamm 2	Goals	Dervisis 3	Nambu University Aquatics Center, Gwangju; Referees: Stanko Ivanovski (MNE), Nenad Peris (CRO)

=== Women's tournament ===
Team roster

- Ioanna Stamatopoulou
- Marina Kotsioni
- Christina Tsoukala
- Ioanna Chydirioti
- Nikoleta Eleftheriadou
- Christina Kotsia
- Alkisti Avramidou
- Alexandra Asimaki (C)
- Maria Patra
- Alkistis Benekou
- Eirini Ninou
- Eleftheria Plevritou
- Eleni Xenaki
- Coach: Georgios Morfesis

Group C

Pos	Team	Pld	W	D	L	GF	GA	GD	Pts	Qualification
1	Spain	3	3	0	0	51	16	+35	6	Quarterfinals
2	Greece	3	2	0	1	37	25	+12	4	Playoffs
3	Kazakhstan	3	1	0	2	22	37	−15	2	Playoffs
4	Cuba	3	0	0	3	16	48	−32	0	

Source: Sportresult
Rules for classification: 1) points; 2) head-to-head points; 3) head-to-head goal difference; 4) head-to-head number of goals scored; 5) Goal difference.

14 July 2019; 17:50	Report	Greece	4–14	Spain	Nambu University Aquatics Center, Gwangju; Referees: Boris Margeta (SLO), Michiel Zwart (NED)
14 July 2019; 17:50	Report	Score by quarters: 1–6, 2–2, 0–3, 1–3			Nambu University Aquatics Center, Gwangju; Referees: Boris Margeta (SLO), Michiel Zwart (NED)
14 July 2019; 17:50	Report	four players 1	Goals	Tarragó 6	Nambu University Aquatics Center, Gwangju; Referees: Boris Margeta (SLO), Michiel Zwart (NED)

16 July 2019; 12:30	Report	Cuba	4–20	Greece	Nambu University Aquatics Center, Gwangju; Referees: Adrian Alexandrescu (ROU), Ni Shi Wei (CHN)
16 July 2019; 12:30	Report	Score by quarters: 0-5, 3-6, 0-5, 1-4			Nambu University Aquatics Center, Gwangju; Referees: Adrian Alexandrescu (ROU), Ni Shi Wei (CHN)
16 July 2019; 12:30	Report	Carrasco 2	Goals	Avramidou 6	Nambu University Aquatics Center, Gwangju; Referees: Adrian Alexandrescu (ROU), Ni Shi Wei (CHN)

18 July 2019; 09:50	Report	Greece	13–7	Kazakhstan	Nambu University Aquatics Center, Gwangju; Referees: Sebastien Dervieux (FRA), Adrian Alexandrescu (ROU)
18 July 2019; 09:50	Report	Score by quarters: 4–1, 4–1, 1–3, 4–2			Nambu University Aquatics Center, Gwangju; Referees: Sebastien Dervieux (FRA), Adrian Alexandrescu (ROU)
18 July 2019; 09:50	Report	Xenaki 3	Goals	Zakirova 3	Nambu University Aquatics Center, Gwangju; Referees: Sebastien Dervieux (FRA), Adrian Alexandrescu (ROU)

Playoffs

20 July 2019; 17:00	Report	Greece	12–8	China	Nambu University Aquatics Center, Gwangju; Referees: Nenad Periš (CRO), Dion Willis (RSA)
20 July 2019; 17:00	Report	Score by quarters: 4–1, 2–2, 4–4, 2–1			Nambu University Aquatics Center, Gwangju; Referees: Nenad Periš (CRO), Dion Willis (RSA)
20 July 2019; 17:00	Report	Plevritou 3	Goals	Zhao 4	Nambu University Aquatics Center, Gwangju; Referees: Nenad Periš (CRO), Dion Willis (RSA)

Quarterfinals

22 July 2019; 14:00	Report	United States	15–5	Greece	Nambu University Aquatics Center, Gwangju; Referees: Gabriella Várkonyi (HUN), Jaume Teixidó (ESP)
22 July 2019; 14:00	Report	Score by quarters: 4–0, 4–2, 2–2, 5–1			Nambu University Aquatics Center, Gwangju; Referees: Gabriella Várkonyi (HUN), Jaume Teixidó (ESP)
22 July 2019; 14:00	Report	Musselman 4	Goals	Eleftheriadou, Xenaki 2	Nambu University Aquatics Center, Gwangju; Referees: Gabriella Várkonyi (HUN), Jaume Teixidó (ESP)

5th–8th place semifinals

24 July 2019; 14:00	Report	Greece	4–13	Russia	Nambu University Aquatics Center, Gwangju; Referees: Stanko Ivanovski (MNE), Jaume Teixidó (ESP)
24 July 2019; 14:00	Report	Score by quarters: 0–2, 1–2, 2–4, 1–5			Nambu University Aquatics Center, Gwangju; Referees: Stanko Ivanovski (MNE), Jaume Teixidó (ESP)
24 July 2019; 14:00	Report	Plevritou 2	Goals	Bersneva, Karimova 3	Nambu University Aquatics Center, Gwangju; Referees: Stanko Ivanovski (MNE), Jaume Teixidó (ESP)

Seventh place game

26 July 2019; 14:00	Report	Greece	9–11	Netherlands	Nambu University Aquatics Center, Gwangju; Referees: Germán Moller (ARG), Alessandro Severo (ITA)
26 July 2019; 14:00	Report	Score by quarters: 2–1, 1–5, 6–4, 0–1			Nambu University Aquatics Center, Gwangju; Referees: Germán Moller (ARG), Alessandro Severo (ITA)
26 July 2019; 14:00	Report	Kotsia 3	Goals	Megens, Keuning 3	Nambu University Aquatics Center, Gwangju; Referees: Germán Moller (ARG), Alessandro Severo (ITA)
