= Anna Eltisheva =

Uzbekistani synchronized swimmer (born 2000)

Personal information
- Born: 6 April 2000 (age 26)

Sport
- Sport: Swimming
- Strokes: Synchronized swimming

Anna Eltisheva (born 6 April 2000) is an Uzbekistani synchronized swimmer. She represented Uzbekistan at the 2017 World Aquatics Championships in Budapest, Hungary and at the 2019 World Aquatics Championships in Gwangju, South Korea.

In 2018, she finished in 5th place in the women's team event at the Asian Games held in Jakarta, Indonesia. In the women's duet she also finished in 5th place.

At the 2019 World Aquatics Championships, Eltisheva and Anastasiya Morozova competed in the duet technical routine and duet free routine. In the duet technical routine they finished in 23rd place in the preliminary round and in the duet free routine they finished in 22nd place in the preliminary round.
