= San Marino at the 2023 World Aquatics Championships =

- Flag of San Marino
- FINA code: SMR
- National federation: Federazione Sammarinese Nuoto
- Website: www.fsn.sm

in Fukuoka, Japan
- Competitors: 3 in 2 sports
- Medals: Gold 0 Silver 0 Bronze 0 Total 0

World Aquatics Championships appearances
- 1994; 1998; 2001; 2003; 2005; 2007; 2009; 2011; 2013; 2015; 2017; 2019; 2022; 2023; 2024

San Marino competed at the 2023 World Aquatics Championships in Fukuoka, Japan from 14 to 30 July.

== Artistic swimming ==
San Marino entered 1 artistic swimmer.

Women

| Athlete | Event | Preliminaries | | Final | |
| Athlete | Event | Points | Rank | Points | Rank |
|---|---|---|---|---|---|
| Jasmine Verbena | Solo technical routine | 178.0966 | 14 | Did not advance | |
| Jasmine Verbena | Solo free routine | 182.3520 | 5 Q | 186.4918 | 7 |

== Swimming ==
San Marino entered 2 swimmers.

Men

| Athlete | Event | Heat | | Semifinal | | Final | |
| Athlete | Event | Time | Rank | Time | Rank | Time | Rank |
|---|---|---|---|---|---|---|---|
| Loris Bianchi | 200 metre freestyle | 1:53.10 | 45 | Did not advance | | | |
| Loris Bianchi | 400 metre freestyle | 4:03.88 | 38 | — | | Did not advance | |
| Giacomo Casadei | 50 metre breaststroke | 29.84 | 47 | Did not advance | | | |
| Giacomo Casadei | 100 metre breaststroke | 1:04.31 | 51 | Did not advance | | | |
