= Isabelle Thorpe =

British synchronised swimmer (born 2001)

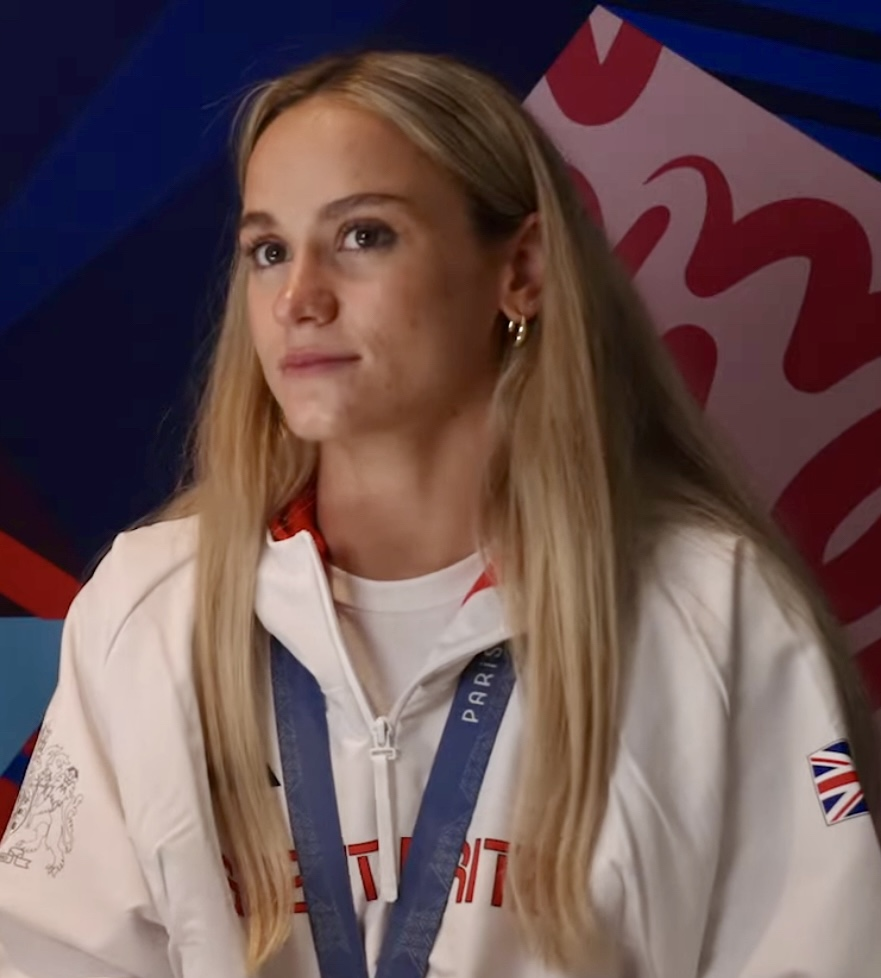
- Thorpe in 2024

Personal information
- Full name: Isabelle Anya Thorpe
- National team: United Kingdom
- Born: 4 March 2001 (age 25) Bristol, England
- Height: 165 cm (5 ft 5 in)

Sport
- Sport: Swimming
- Strokes: Synchronised swimming
- Club: City of bristol
- Coach: Yumiko Tomomatsu
Medal record
Representing Great Britain
Olympic Games
| Silver medal – second place | 2024 Paris | Duet |
World Championships
| Silver medal – second place | 2024 Doha | Duet technical |
| Bronze medal – third place | 2024 Doha | Duet free |
| Bronze medal – third place | 2025 Singapore | Mixed duet free |
European Championships
| Gold medal – first place | 2026 Paris | Mixed duet free |
| Gold medal – first place | 2026 Paris | Mixed duet technical |
| Silver medal – second place | 2024 Belgrade | Duet technical |
| Silver medal – second place | 2024 Belgrade | Duet free |
| Silver medal – second place | 2025 Funchal | Mixed duet technical |
| Bronze medal – third place | 2026 Paris | Duet technical |
European Games
| Bronze medal – third place | 2023 Kraków-Małopolska | Duet free |

Isabelle Anya Thorpe (born 4 March 2001) is a British synchronised swimmer who won a silver medal at the 2024 Summer Olympics in the duet. She competed in the women's duet event at the 2020 Summer Olympics held in Tokyo, Japan. She also represented Great Britain at the 2017 World Aquatics Championships in Budapest, Hungary and at the 2019 World Aquatics Championships in Gwangju, South Korea. She also competed at the 2022 World Aquatics Championships in Budapest, Hungary. She trains at the City of Bristol Swimming Club.

== Career ==
At the 2019 World Aquatics Championships, Thorpe and Kate Shortman competed in the duet technical routine and duet free routine and they finished in 14th place in the preliminary round in both events.

In 2021, she competed in the duet free routine and duet technical routine events at the 2020 European Aquatics Championships held in Budapest, Hungary. Thorpe and Kate Shortman finished in 9th place in the duet technical routine at the 2022 World Aquatics Championships held in Budapest, Hungary.

At the 2024 World Aquatics Championships in Doha, Thorpe and Shortman won the silver medal in the Duet technical routine competition, becoming the first Britons to do so. The pair followed this up with bronze in the Duet free routine competition. This ensured the duo's qualification for the 2024 Paris Olympics where they won a silver medal. This was the first ever medal for Great Britain in artistic swimming at the Olympics.
