= South Korea at the 2019 World Aquatics Championships =

- Flag of South Korea
- FINA code: KOR
- National federation: Korea Swimming Federation
- Website: swimming.sports.or.kr (in Korean)

in Gwangju, South Korea
- Medals Ranked 23rd: Gold 0 Silver 0 Bronze 1 Total 1

World Aquatics Championships appearances
- 1973; 1975; 1978; 1982; 1986; 1991; 1994; 1998; 2001; 2003; 2005; 2007; 2009; 2011; 2013; 2015; 2017; 2019; 2022; 2023; 2024

South Korea competed at the 2019 World Aquatics Championships in Gwangju, South Korea from 12 to 28 July.The country participated in all six disciplines: swimming, diving, high diving, open water swimming, artistic swimming, and water polo.

== Medalists ==
Medal	Name	Sport	Event	Date
Bronze	Kim Su-ji	Diving	Women's 1 m springboard	13 July

== Artistic swimming ==
South Korea entered 11 artistic swimmers.

Women

Athlete	Event	Preliminaries		Final	
Athlete	Event	Points	Rank	Points	Rank
Lee Ri-young	Solo technical routine	77.4921	15	Did not advance	
Lee Ri-young	Solo free routine	78.8000	16	Did not advance	
Baek Seo-yeon; Lee Ri-young	Duet technical routine	74.8296	31	Did not advance	
Baek Seo-yeon; Koo Ye-mo	Duet free routine	75.0333	33	Did not advance	
Baek Seo-yeon; Kim Ji-hye; Kim Jun-hee; Koo Ye-mo; Lee Gabin; Lee Jae-hyun; Lee Ri-young; Lee You-jin; Kim So-jin (R); Song Min-ju (R)	Team technical routine	76.4096	17	Did not advance	
Baek Seo-yeon; Kim Ji-hye; Kim Jun-hee; Koo Ye-mo; Lee Gabin; Lee Jae-hyun; Lee Ri-young; Lee You-jin; Kim So-jin (R); Shin Jeong-yun (R)	Team free routine	77.1667	18	Did not advance	
Baek Seo-yeon; Kim Ji-hye; Kim Jun-hee; Kim So-jin; Koo Ye-mo; Lee Gabin; Lee Jae-hyun; Lee You-jin; Shin Jeong-yun; Song Min-ju; Lee Ri-young (R)	Free routine combination	77.7000	11 Q	78.8000	11

Legend: (R) = Reserve Athlete

== Diving ==
South Korea entered 8 divers.

Men

Athlete	Event	Preliminaries		Semifinals		Final	
Athlete	Event	Points	Rank	Points	Rank	Points	Rank
Kim Yeong-nam	1 m springboard	349.10	13	—		Did not advance	
Woo Ha-ram	1 m springboard	396.10	3 Q	—		406.15	4
Woo Ha-ram	3 m springboard	457.70	3 Q	430.65	11 Q	478.80	4
Woo Ha-ram	10 m platform	485.15	4 Q	493.90	4 Q	477.25	6
Kim Yeong-taek	3 m springboard	356.65	33	Did not advance			
Kim Yeong-taek	10 m platform	298.40	38	Did not advance			
Kim Yeong-nam; Woo Ha-ram	3 m synchronized springboard	376.47	5 Q	—		372.33	10
Kim Yeong-nam; Woo Ha-ram	10 m synchronized platform	377.91	7 Q	—		401.67	6

Women

Athlete	Event	Preliminaries		Semifinals		Final	
Athlete	Event	Points	Rank	Points	Rank	Points	Rank
Kwon Ha-lim	1 m springboard	217.80	17	—		Did not advance	
Kim Su-ji	1 m springboard	238.95	8 Q	—		257.20	3rd place, bronze medalist(s)
Kim Su-ji	3 m springboard	256.95	21	Did not advance			
Cho Eun-bi	3 m springboard	221.15	40	Did not advance			
Cho Eun-bi	10 m platform	263.45	23	Did not advance			
Moon Na-yun	10 m platform	268.50	22	Did not advance			
Cho Eun-bi; Kim Su-ji	3 m synchronized springboard	257.52	11 Q	—		258.75	12
Cho Eun-bi; Moon Na-yun	10 m synchronized platform	256.86	12 Q	—		261.12	10

Mixed

Athlete	Event	Final	
Athlete	Event	Points	Rank
Kim Ji-wook; Kim Su-ji	3 m synchronized springboard	249.90	15
Kim Ji-wook; Kwon Ha-lim	10 m synchronized platform	247.20	7

== Open water swimming ==
South Korea qualified four male and four female open water swimmers.

Men

Athlete	Event	Time	Rank
Baek Seung-ho	5 km	57:05.3	48
Cho Jae-hoo	5 km	59:57.8	52
Jae Park	10 km	1:56:41.4	59
Park Seok-hyun	10 km	1:52:47.6	53

Women

Athlete	Event	Time	Rank
Ban Seon-jae	5 km	1:04:26.9	46
Jung Ha-eun	10 km	2:09:36.8	55
Lee Jeong-min	5 km	1:04:47.0	48
Lim Da-youn	10 km	2:07:50.9	53

Mixed

Athlete	Event	Time	Rank
Ban Seon-jae; Park Seok-hyun; Jung Ha-eun; Jae Park	Team	58:59.0	18

== Swimming ==
South Korea entered 29 swimmers.

Men

Athlete	Event	Heat		Semifinal		Final	
Athlete	Event	Time	Rank	Time	Rank	Time	Rank
Cho Sung-jae	200 m breaststroke	2:13.48	30	Did not advance			
Heo Hwan	50 m butterfly	24.63	48	Did not advance			
Kim Min-seop	200 m butterfly	2:00.95	32	Did not advance			
Kim Min-suk	200 m individual medley	2:02.36	29	Did not advance			
Kim Min-suk	400 m individual medley	4:22.06	21	—		Did not advance	
Kim Woo-min	800 m freestyle	8:14.44	31	—		Did not advance	
Kim Woo-min	1500 m freestyle	15:26.17	28	—		Did not advance	
Lee Ho-joon	200 m freestyle	1:48.89	31	Did not advance			
Lee Ho-joon	400 m freestyle	3:51.89	22	—		Did not advance	
Lee Ju-ho	50 m backstroke	25.42	22	Did not advance			
Lee Ju-ho	100 m backstroke	54.56	25	Did not advance			
Lee Ju-ho	200 m backstroke	1:57.80	12 Q	1:57.68	11	Did not advance	
Moon Jae-kwon	50 m breaststroke	27.57	23	Did not advance			
Moon Jae-kwon	100 m breaststroke	1:01.24	31	Did not advance			
Yang Jae-hoon	50 m freestyle	22.26	19	Did not advance			
Yang Jae-hoon	100 m freestyle	49.37	29	Did not advance			
Yun Seok-hwan	100 m butterfly	53.64	34	Did not advance			
Hwang Sun-woo; Jang Dong-hyeok; Park Seon-kwan; Yang Jae-hoon	4×100 m freestyle relay	3:18.09	22	—		Did not advance	
Lee Yoo-yeon; Jang Dong-hyeok; Hwang Sun-woo; Lee Ho-joon	4×200 m freestyle relay	7:15.05 NR	18	—		Did not advance	
Lee Ju-ho; Moon Jae-kwon; Yun Seok-hwan; Yang Jae-hoon	4×100 m medley relay	3:36.97 NR	17	—		Did not advance	

Women

Athlete	Event	Heat		Semifinal		Final	
Athlete	Event	Time	Rank	Time	Rank	Time	Rank
Back Su-yeon	50 m breaststroke	32.02	28	Did not advance			
Back Su-yeon	100 m breaststroke	1:08.52	21	Did not advance			
Back Su-yeon	200 m breaststroke	2:26.56	16 Q	2:26.29	13	Did not advance	
Han Da-kyung	800 m freestyle	8:49.90	26	—		Did not advance	
Han Da-kyung	1500 m freestyle	16:49.13	22	—		Did not advance	
Im Da-sol	50 m backstroke	28.50	22	Did not advance			
Im Da-sol	100 m backstroke	1:00.86	18	Did not advance			
Im Da-sol	200 m backstroke	2:11.33	20	Did not advance			
Jeong So-eun	50 m freestyle	25.40	=25	Did not advance			
Jeong So-eun	100 m freestyle	55.86	35	Did not advance			
Jo Hyun-ju	200 m freestyle	2:03.16	32	Did not advance			
Kim Seo-yeong	200 m individual medley	2:11.45	10 Q	2:10.21	7 Q	2:10.12	6
Kim Seo-yeong	400 m individual medley	4:40.55	10	—		Did not advance	
Park Su-jin	200 m butterfly	2:10.73	17	Did not advance			
Park Ye-rin	50 m butterfly	26.75	24	Did not advance			
Park Ye-rin	100 m butterfly	58.99	21	Did not advance			
Ryu Ji-won	400 m freestyle	4:21.70	32	—		Did not advance	
Lee Kun-a; Jeong So-eun; Choi Ji-won; Jung You-in	4×100 m freestyle relay	3:42.58	15	—		Did not advance	
Choi Jung-min; Jung Hyun-young; Park Na-ri; Jo Hyun-ju	4×200 m freestyle relay	8:08.38	12	—		Did not advance	
Im Da-sol; Back Su-yeon; Park Ye-rin; Jeong So-eun	4×100 m medley relay	4:03.38 NR	13	—		Did not advance	

Mixed

Athlete	Event	Heat		Final	
Athlete	Event	Time	Rank	Time	Rank
Yang Jae-hoon; Lee Kun-a; Jeong So-eun; Park Seon-kwan	4×100 m freestyle relay	3:31.20	13	Did not advance	
Lee Ju-ho; Moon Jae-kwon; Park Ye-rin; Jeong So-eun	4×100 m medley relay	3:50.89	17	Did not advance	

== Water polo ==
=== Men's tournament ===
Team roster

- Lee Jin-woo
- Kim Dong-hyeok
- Kim Byeong-ju
- Lee Seon-uk (C)
- Gwon Dae-yong
- Lee Seong-gyu
- Gwon Yeong-gyun
- Kim Moon-soo
- Chu Min-jong
- Han Hyo-min
- Seo Kang-won
- Song Jae-hoon
- Jung Byeong-young
- Coach: Go Ki-mura

Group A

Pos	Team	Pld	W	D	L	GF	GA	GD	Pts	Qualification
1	Serbia	3	2	1	0	41	15	+26	5	Quarterfinals
2	Montenegro	3	1	2	0	44	26	+18	4	Playoffs
3	Greece	3	1	1	1	39	22	+17	3	Playoffs
4	South Korea (H)	3	0	0	3	11	72	−61	0	

Source: Sportresult
Rules for classification: 1) points; 2) head-to-head points; 3) head-to-head goal difference; 4) head-to-head number of goals scored; 5) Goal difference.
(H) Hosts

15 July 2019; 09:50	Report	South Korea	3–26	Greece	Nambu University Aquatics Center, Gwangju; Referees: Jeremy Cheng (SGP), Gabriella Várkonyi (HUN)
15 July 2019; 09:50	Report	Score by quarters: 0–7, 0–7, 1–3, 2–9			Nambu University Aquatics Center, Gwangju; Referees: Jeremy Cheng (SGP), Gabriella Várkonyi (HUN)
15 July 2019; 09:50	Report	Kim Dong-hyeok 2	Goals	three players 4	Nambu University Aquatics Center, Gwangju; Referees: Jeremy Cheng (SGP), Gabriella Várkonyi (HUN)

17 July 2019; 20:30	Report	Serbia	22–2	South Korea	Nambu University Aquatics Center, Gwangju; Referees: Ni Shi Wei (CHN), John Waldow (NZL)
17 July 2019; 20:30	Report	Score by quarters: 6–1, 5–0, 4–1, 7–0			Nambu University Aquatics Center, Gwangju; Referees: Ni Shi Wei (CHN), John Waldow (NZL)
17 July 2019; 20:30	Report	Jakšić 5	Goals	Han H., Lee Seong. 1	Nambu University Aquatics Center, Gwangju; Referees: Ni Shi Wei (CHN), John Waldow (NZL)

19 July 2019; 17:50	Report	South Korea	6–24	Montenegro	Nambu University Aquatics Center, Gwangju; Referees: Alessandro Severo (ITA), Ni Shi Wei (CHN)
19 July 2019; 17:50	Report	Score by quarters: 1–6, 1–4, 1–8, 3–6			Nambu University Aquatics Center, Gwangju; Referees: Alessandro Severo (ITA), Ni Shi Wei (CHN)
19 July 2019; 17:50	Report	Han H., Lee Seonu. 2	Goals	Ivović 6	Nambu University Aquatics Center, Gwangju; Referees: Alessandro Severo (ITA), Ni Shi Wei (CHN)

13th–16th place semifinals

21 July 2019; 10:30	Report	South Korea	4–17	Kazakhstan	Nambu University Aquatics Center, Gwangju; Referees: Daniel Flahive (AUS), Vojin Putniković (SRB)
21 July 2019; 10:30	Report	Score by quarters: 1–4, 2–4, 0–7, 1–2			Nambu University Aquatics Center, Gwangju; Referees: Daniel Flahive (AUS), Vojin Putniković (SRB)
21 July 2019; 10:30	Report	four players 1	Goals	Aubakirov 4	Nambu University Aquatics Center, Gwangju; Referees: Daniel Flahive (AUS), Vojin Putniković (SRB)

15th place game

23 July 2019; 08:00	Report	South Korea	17–16	New Zealand	Nambu University Aquatics Center, Gwangju; Referees: Jaume Teixidó (ESP), Sebastien Dervieux (FRA)
23 July 2019; 08:00	Report	Score by quarters: 3–3, 2–2, 4–5, 3–2 PSO: 5–4			Nambu University Aquatics Center, Gwangju; Referees: Jaume Teixidó (ESP), Sebastien Dervieux (FRA)
23 July 2019; 08:00	Report	Gwon Y-g 3	Goals	Lewis 4	Nambu University Aquatics Center, Gwangju; Referees: Jaume Teixidó (ESP), Sebastien Dervieux (FRA)

=== Women's tournament ===
Team roster

Group B

Pos	Team	Pld	W	D	L	GF	GA	GD	Pts	Qualification
1	Russia	3	3	0	0	65	23	+42	6	Quarterfinals
2	Hungary	3	2	0	1	91	31	+60	4	Playoffs
3	Canada	3	1	0	2	46	35	+11	2	Playoffs
4	South Korea (H)	3	0	0	3	3	116	−113	0	

Source: Sportresult
Rules for classification: 1) points; 2) head-to-head points; 3) head-to-head goal difference; 4) head-to-head number of goals scored; 5) Goal difference.
(H) Hosts

14 July 2019; 12:30	Report	Hungary	64–0	South Korea	Nambu University Aquatics Center, Gwangju; Referees: Jeremy Cheng (SIN), John Waldow (NZL)
14 July 2019; 12:30	Report	Score by quarters: 16–0, 18–0, 16–0, 14–0			Nambu University Aquatics Center, Gwangju; Referees: Jeremy Cheng (SIN), John Waldow (NZL)
14 July 2019; 12:30	Report	Parkes 11	Goals		Nambu University Aquatics Center, Gwangju; Referees: Jeremy Cheng (SIN), John Waldow (NZL)

16 July 2019; 08:30	Report	South Korea	1–30	Russia	Nambu University Aquatics Center, Gwangju; Referees: Jaume Teixidó (ESP), Dion Willis (RSA)
16 July 2019; 08:30	Report	Score by quarters: 0–7, 0–9, 0–8, 1–6			Nambu University Aquatics Center, Gwangju; Referees: Jaume Teixidó (ESP), Dion Willis (RSA)
16 July 2019; 08:30	Report	Kyung 1	Goals	ten players 3	Nambu University Aquatics Center, Gwangju; Referees: Jaume Teixidó (ESP), Dion Willis (RSA)

18 July 2019; 19:10	Report	Canada	22–2	South Korea	Nambu University Aquatics Center, Gwangju; Referees: Michiel Zwart (NED), Michael Goldenberg (USA)
18 July 2019; 19:10	Report	Score by quarters: 5–0, 6–0, 6–0, 5–2			Nambu University Aquatics Center, Gwangju; Referees: Michiel Zwart (NED), Michael Goldenberg (USA)
18 July 2019; 19:10	Report	Christmas, E. Wright 3	Goals	Kyung, Lee J. 1	Nambu University Aquatics Center, Gwangju; Referees: Michiel Zwart (NED), Michael Goldenberg (USA)

13th–16th place semifinals

20 July 2019; 10:30	Report	South Africa	26–3	South Korea	Nambu University Aquatics Center, Gwangju; Referees: Arkadiy Voevodin (RUS), Kunihiro Sato (JPN)
20 July 2019; 10:30	Report	Score by quarters: 7–1, 4–0, 7–1, 8–1			Nambu University Aquatics Center, Gwangju; Referees: Arkadiy Voevodin (RUS), Kunihiro Sato (JPN)
20 July 2019; 10:30	Report	three players 4	Goals	three players 1	Nambu University Aquatics Center, Gwangju; Referees: Arkadiy Voevodin (RUS), Kunihiro Sato (JPN)

15th place game

22 July 2019; 08:00	Report	South Korea	0–30	Cuba	Nambu University Aquatics Center, Gwangju; Referees: Natacha Florestano (BRA), Viktor Salnichenko (KAZ)
22 July 2019; 08:00	Report	Score by quarters: 0–8, 0–9, 0–6, 0–7			Nambu University Aquatics Center, Gwangju; Referees: Natacha Florestano (BRA), Viktor Salnichenko (KAZ)
22 July 2019; 08:00	Report		Goals	four players 5	Nambu University Aquatics Center, Gwangju; Referees: Natacha Florestano (BRA), Viktor Salnichenko (KAZ)
