= Artistic swimming at the 2018 Asian Games – Women's team =

Women's team at the 2018 Asian Games
- Venue: Gelora Bung Karno Aquatic Stadium
- Date: 29 August 2018
- Competitors: 89 from 10 nations

Medalists
gold medal	China; Chang Hao, Feng Yu, Guo Li, Liang Xinping, Wang Liuyi, Wang Qianyi, Xiao Yanning, Yin Chengxin
silver medal	Japan; Juka Fukumura, Yukiko Inui, Moeka Kijima, Okina Kyogoku, Kei Marumo, Kano Omata, Mayu Tsukamoto, Mashiro Yasunaga, Megumu Yoshida
bronze medal	North Korea; Cha Ye-gyong, Jang Hyon-ok, Jong Na-ri, Ko Su-rim, Min Hae-yon, Mun Hye-song, Ri Il-sim, Ri Sol, Yun Yu-jong

The women's team event at the 2018 Asian Games took place on 29 August 2018 at the Gelora Bung Karno Aquatic Stadium.

== Schedule ==
All times are Western Indonesia Time (UTC+07:00)

Date	Time	Event
Wednesday, 29 August 2018	10:00	Technical routine
Wednesday, 29 August 2018	14:00	Free routine

== Results ==
Legend

- FR — Reserve in free
- RR — Reserve in technical and free
- TR — Reserve in technical

Rank	Team	Technical	Free	Total
1st place, gold medalist(s)	China (CHN); Chang Hao; Feng Yu; Guo Li; Liang Xinping; Wang Liuyi; Wang Qianyi; Xiao Yanning; Yin Chengxin	92.5062	94.4333	186.9395
2nd place, silver medalist(s)	Japan (JPN); Juka Fukumura; Yukiko Inui; Moeka Kijima (FR); Okina Kyogoku (TR); Kei Marumo; Kano Omata; Mayu Tsukamoto; Mashiro Yasunaga; Megumu Yoshida	90.9357	91.9333	182.8690
3rd place, bronze medalist(s)	North Korea (PRK); Cha Ye-gyong (RR); Jang Hyon-ok; Jong Na-ri; Ko Su-rim; Min Hae-yon; Mun Hye-song; Ri Il-sim; Ri Sol; Yun Yu-jong	84.5142	86.3333	170.8475
4	Kazakhstan (KAZ); Yana Degtyareva; Yelena Krylova; Alina Matkova; Alexandra Nemich (FR); Yekaterina Nemich (TR); Jennifer Russanova; Yekaterina Simonova; Kristina Tynybayeva; Olga Yezdakova	80.5444	82.5000	163.0444
5	Uzbekistan (UZB); Anna Eltisheva; Khurshida Khakimova; Anastasiya Morozova; Diana Onkes; Anastasiya Ruzmetova; Nigora Shomakhsudova (TR); Nafisa Shomirzaeva (FR); Khonzodakhon Toshkhujaeva; Mokhirakhon Tulkinova (TR); Nozimakhon Tulkinova (FR)	76.4403	78.0333	154.4736
6	South Korea (KOR); Baek Seo-yeon; Choi Jung-yeon; Jung Young-hee; Kim Jun-hee (RR); Kim So-jin; Koo Ye-mo; Lee Jae-hyun (RR); Lee Ri-young; Lee You-jin; Uhm Ji-wan	75.7956	77.4667	153.2623
7	Singapore (SGP); Hannah Chiang; Lee Yi Jie; Ariel Sng; Debbie Soh; Posh Soh; Vivien Tai; Teo Mou Wen; Rachel Thean	73.0044	74.8667	147.8711
8	Macau (MAC); Au Ieong Sin Ieng; Chan Chi Ian (RR); Chau Cheng Han; Kou Chin; Lei Cheok Ian; Lei Cheuk Sze; Leong Mei Hun; Li Ni (TR); Lo Wai Lam; Zheng Zexuan (FR)	69.5442	72.7333	142.2775
9	Hong Kong (HKG); Chan Hoi Lam; Cheung Ka Wing; Chew Ching Lam; Haruka Kawazoe; Kwok Kam Wing; Pang Tsz Ching; Christie Poon; Tze Yan Hei	66.9680	70.5000	137.4680
10	Indonesia (INA); Andriani Shintya Ardhana; Nabila Putri Giswatama; Sherly Haryono; Maharani Sekar Langit; Petra Septaria Puspa Melati; Iin Rahmadhania; Naima Syeeda Sharita; Nurfa Nurul Utami	64.5059	67.7667	132.2726
