= Kate Shortman =

British synchronised swimmer

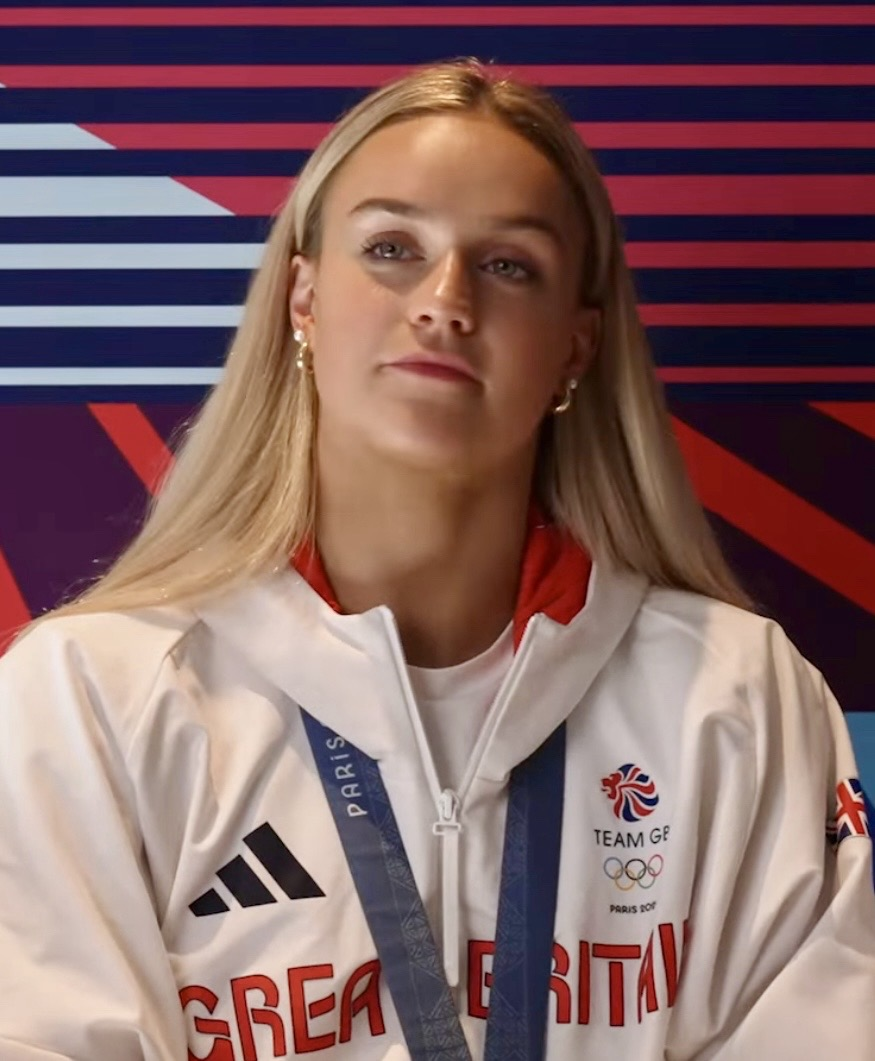
- Shortman in 2024

Personal information
- Full name: Kate Elizabeth Shortman
- Nationality: British
- Born: 19 November 2001 (age 24) Bristol, England
- Height: 164 cm (5 ft 5 in)

Sport
- Sport: Swimming
- Strokes: Synchronised swimming
- Club: City of Bristol
- Coach: Yumiko Tomomatsu
Medal record
Representing Great Britain
Olympic Games
Silver medal – second place	2024 Paris	Duet
World Championships
Silver medal – second place	2024 Doha	Duet technical routine
Bronze medal – third place	2023 Fukuoka	Solo free routine
Bronze medal – third place	2024 Doha	Duet free routine
European Championships
Silver medal – second place	2024 Belgrade	Duet technical routine
Silver medal – second place	2024 Belgrade	Duet free routine
Bronze medal – third place	2026 Paris	Duet technical routine
European Games
Bronze medal – third place	2023 Kraków-Małopolska	Duet free routine

Kate Elizabeth Shortman (born 19 November 2001) is a British synchronised swimmer, the most successful in her nation's history. With partner Isabelle Thorpe, she won a silver medal at the 2024 Summer Olympics in the duet, the first medal won by Great Britain in the sport.

Shortman competed in the women's duet event at the 2020 Summer Olympics held in Tokyo, Japan. She has also represented Great Britain at the 2017 World Aquatics Championships in Budapest, Hungary, at the 2019 World Aquatics Championships in Gwangju, South Korea the 2022 World Aquatics Championships in Budapest, Hungary. In 2023 at the 2023 World Aquatics Championships in Fukuoka, she won a first world medal in the solo free routine, after winning a duet bronze with Thorpe at the 2023 European Games. The following year saw consistent silver medal success for Shortman and Thorpe in European, World and finally Olympic duet.

== Progression ==
At the 2019 World Aquatics Championships, she finished in 10th place in the solo technical routine and in 11th place in the solo free routine. Shortman and Isabelle Thorpe competed in the duet technical routine and duet free routine and they finished in 14th place in the preliminary round in both events.

In 2021, she competed in the solo free routine, the duet free routine and duet technical routine events at the 2020 European Aquatics Championships held in Budapest, Hungary.

She finished in 7th place in the solo technical routine at the 2022 World Aquatics Championships held in Budapest, Hungary. Shortman and Isabelle Thorpe finished in 9th place in the duet technical routine.

At the 2024 World Aquatics Championships in Doha, Thorpe and Shortman won the silver medal in the Duet technical routine competition, becoming the first Britons to do so. The pair followed this up with bronze in the Duet free routine competition. This ensured the duo's qualification for the 2024 Paris Olympics where they won a silver medal. This was the first ever medal for Great Britain in artistic swimming at the Olympics.

== Early life and education ==
Shortman was born in Bristol. She attended Redland High School and Redmaids' High School before attending Clifton High School along with Isabelle Thorpe. Shortman earned a Bill Whiteley Scholarship to study International Management and French at the University of Bath.

Shortman and Thorpe train at the City of Bristol Swimming Club.
