= Ariel Nassee =

Israeli artistic swimmer

Personal information
- Nationality: Israel
- Born: 6 October 2003 (age 22)

Sport
- Sport: Artistic swimming
- Event(s): Duet, Team
Medal record
Representing Israel
Artistic swimming
European Games
Gold medal – first place	2023 Oswiecim	Free routine combination
Bronze medal – third place	2023 Oswiecim	Team free routine
European Championships
Bronze medal – third place	2024 Belgrade	Duet technical routine
Bronze medal – third place	2024 Belgrade	Duet free routine

Ariel Nassee (born 6 October 2003) is an Israeli Olympic swimmer who competes in Artistic swimming. She competed in the 2024 Summer Olympics in duet with Shelly Bobritsky. She was also part of the 2023 European Games winning team in the free combination event which also claimed bronze in the team free routine. In Duet she and Bobritsky also won two 2024 European Championships bronze medals.
