= Natalija Ambrazaitė =

Lithuanian synchronized swimmer (born 2001)

Personal information
- Nationality: Lithuanian
- Born: 24 April 2001 (age 24)

Sport
- Country: Lithuania
- Sport: Artistic swimming
- Event: Solo

Natalija Ambrazaitė (born 24 April 2001) is a Lithuanian female synchronized swimmer. She is the first Lithuanian to compete in World Championships.

Natalija Ambrazaitė competed at the 2019 World Aquatics Championships, where she became the first Lithuanian to ever compete at the World Championships. Ambrazaitė finished 24th in technical event and 27th in free routine.
