= Shelly Bobritsky =

Israeli artistic swimmer

Shelly Brobitsky שלי בובריצקי
Personal information
- Nationality: Israeli
- Born: 27 June 2001 (age 25) Rehovot, Israel

Sport
- Sport: Artistic swimming
- Event: Duet
- Coached by: Svetlana Blecher and Anna Tres
Medal record
Representing Israel
Artistic swimming
European Games
Gold medal – first place	2023 Oswiecim	Free routine combination
Bronze medal – third place	2023 Oswiecim	Team free routine
Bronze medal – third place	2023 Oswiecim	Duet free routine
European Championships
Bronze medal – third place	2021 Budapest	Team free routine
Bronze medal – third place	2024 Belgrade	Duet technical routine
Bronze medal – third place	2024 Belgrade	Duet free routine

Shelly Bobritsky (Hebrew: שלי בובריצקי; born 27 June 2001) is an Israeli Olympic swimmer who competes in Artistic swimming. She competed in the 2020 Olympics in duet, was the European Champion in the free combination event in 2023, and was a three-time European medalist as well as a two-time European Cup bronze medalist. Bobritsky represented Israel at the 2024 Paris Olympics in artistic swimming women's duet with Ariel Nassee, and the pair came in 11th.

== Early life ==
Bobritsky was born in and lives in Rehovot, Israel. She is the eldest daughter in a family of three children, with a brother Nir and a younger sister Michal. She graduated high school with majors in chemistry and communication.

== Artistic swimming career ==
Bobritsky first entered a swimming pool when she was seven months old, and has been engaged in artistic swimming since the age of five years old. At 11 years of age, she began competing for Israel's junior team, and in the 11th grade she became a member of Israel's senior team.

=== 2018–19 ===
In March 2018, at 16 years of age, at the FINA Artistic Swimming World Series 2018 in Paris, France, Bobritsky won a bronze medal in the Women Team Highlight.

In May 2018 at the FINA Artistic Swimming World Series 2018 in Budapest, Hungary, she won a silver medal in the Women Team Highlight, and bronze medals in the Women Team Free and the Women Team Free Combination.

In March 2019 at the FINA Artistic Swimming World Series 2019 in Paris, France, Bobritsky won a silver medal in the Women Team Free Combination, and bronze medals in the Women Team Free, Women Team Highlight, and Women Team Technical.

In April 2019 at the FINA Artistic Swimming World Series 2019 in Alexandroupolis, Greece, she won a gold medal in the Women Team Free Combination and a bronze medal in the Women Team Free.

=== 2020–21 ===
In 2020 at the French Open artistic swimming championship in Paris, Bobritsky and Eden Blecher ranked fifth overall in the free duet and seventh in the technical duet.

On April 11, 2021, at the FINA Artistic Swimming World Series 2021 in Budapest, Hungary, she won bronze medals in the Women Duet Free, the Women Duet Technical, and the Women Team Free.

In May 2021 at the 2021 European Aquatics Championships in Budapest, Hungary, Bobritsky won a bronze medal with Team Israel in the team free routine.

=== 2020 Tokyo Summer Olympics (in 2021) ===
In August 2021, Bobritsky represented Israel with Eden Blecher in the Tokyo 2020 Tokyo Summer Olympics Women's duet artistic swimming. They finished in 15th position and did not advance to the finals.

=== 2022 ===
In April 2022 at the FINA Artistic Swimming World Series 2022 in Paris, France, Bobritsky won a gold medal in the Women Team Free Combination, a silver medal in the Women Duet Free, and bronze medals in the Women Team Technical, Women Team Free, and Women Duet Technical.

In May 2022 at the FINA Artistic Swimming World Series 2022 in Australia, she won a gold medal in the Mixed Team Free Combination, silver medals in the Women Duet Free, Women Team Free, and Women Duet Technical, and a bronze medal in the Women Team Technical.

Later in May 2022 at the FINA Artistic Swimming World Series 2022 - Super Final in Athens, Greece, Bobritsky won a gold medal in the Women Team Free, silver medals in the Mixed Team Free Combination and the Women Team Technical, and bronze medals in the Women Duet Free and the Mixed Team Highlight/Acrobatic.

In August 2022 at the European Championships in Rome, Italy, she won a silver medal in the Women Team Free Combination.

=== 2023; European Games gold medal ===
In March 2023 at the World Aquatics Artistic Swimming World Cup in Markham, Canada, Bobritsky and Ariel Nassee won the Women's Duet Technical gold medal and a Duet Free bronze medal, and she won a bronze medal in the team technical.

On May 7, 2023, at the World Aquatics Artistic Swimming World Cup 2023 in the team free she won a silver medal in Montpellier, France.

In June 2023, at the World Aquatics Artistic Swimming World Cup 2023 Super Final in Oviedo, Spain, in the Women Duet Free she won a gold medal, and in the Technical Duet event, Bobritsky and fellow Israeli Ariel Nassee won the gold medal with 225.7915 points. Bobritsky said: "We knew we could win the gold. We are fighting for a medal, so we brought everything we had into this moment. We were focused."

Also in June 2023, at the Artistic swimming at the 2023 European Games – Free routine combination in Oswiecim, Poland, she and Team Israel won the gold medal, and two days later in the team free routine they won the bronze medal, as in the duet free routine Bobritsky won the bronze medal with Ariel Nassee.

On July 5, 2023, she won a silver medal in the team free at the World Aquatics Artistic Swimming World Cup 2023 in France with a personal best score of 356.3647.

=== 2024–present ===
On April 7, 2024, Bobritsky won a gold medal with Ariel Nassee in the Women's Duet Free at the World Aquatics Artistic Swimming World Cup 2024 in Beijing, China.

==== 2024 Paris Olympics ====
Bobritsky represented Israel at the 2024 Paris Olympics in artistic swimming women's-duet with Ariel Nassee at the Paris Aquatic Centre. The pair came in 11th, in Israel's best-ever finish in the sport. They wore yellow ribbons in their hair as they swam, for the hostages being held in Gaza, and used music titled "Shalom Aleichem/October 7th/Hai."

== Career highlights ==
Event	Points	Medal	Age*	Competition	Comp Country	Date
Women Solo Free	73.2000	-	15	FINA Synchro World Series 2017	France	11/03/2017
Women Duet Technical	251.2432	-	22	World Aquatics Championships - Doha 2024	Qatar	05/02/2024
Women Duet Free	293.0209	-	21	World Aquatics Artistic Swimming World Cup 2023	France	06/05/2023
Women Team Technical	84.5315	-	20	19th FINA World Championships Budapest 2022	Hungary	24/06/2022
Women Team Free	84.5333	-	20	19th FINA World Championships Budapest 2022	Hungary	24/06/2022
Women Team Free Combination	85.5667	-	20	19th FINA World Championships Budapest 2022	Hungary	24/06/2022
Women Team Highlight	83.7000	-	18	18th FINA World Championships 2019	Korea	15/07/2019
