= Lee Ri-young =

South Korean synchronized swimmer

Personal information
- Born: 11 August 2000 (age 25)

Sport
- Sport: Swimming
- Strokes: Synchronized swimming

Lee Ri-young (born 11 August 2000) is a South Korean synchronized swimmer. She represented South Korea at the 2017 World Aquatics Championships in Budapest, Hungary and at the 2019 World Aquatics Championships in Gwangju, South Korea. She also competed at the 2022 World Aquatics Championships in Budapest, Hungary.

In 2018, she finished in 6th place in the women's team event at the Asian Games held in Jakarta, Indonesia. In the women's duet she also finished in 6th place.

At the 2019 World Aquatics Championships in Gwangju, South Korea, she finished in 16th place in the preliminary round in the solo free routine. She finished in 15th place in the preliminary round in the solo technical routine. Lee and Baek Seo-yeon competed in the duet technical routine. They finished in 31st place in the preliminary round.
