= Khurshidjon Tursunov =

Uzbekistani swimmer (born 1994)

Personal information
- Born: 5 August 1994 (age 31) Navoiy, Uzbekistan

Sport
- Sport: Swimming
- Strokes: Freestyle
Medal record
Men's swimming
Representing Uzbekistan
Asian Games
Bronze medal – third place	2014 Incheon	4×100 m medley
Islamic Solidarity Games
Gold medal – first place	2021 Konya	4×100 m medley
Silver medal – second place	2021 Konya	50 m freestyle
Silver medal – second place	2021 Konya	100 m freestyle
Silver medal – second place	2021 Konya	4×100 m freestyle

Khurshidjon Tursunov (born 5 August 1994) is an Uzbekistani swimmer. He competed in the men's 100 metre freestyle event at the 2017 World Aquatics Championships. In 2019, he was scheduled to represent Uzbekistan at the 2019 World Aquatics Championships held in Gwangju, South Korea in the men's 50 metre freestyle and men's 100 metre freestyle events. In both events he did not compete.
