= Bregje de Brouwer =

Dutch synchronized swimmer

Personal information
- Nationality: Dutch
- Born: 9 March 1999 (age 27)

Sport
- Sport: Synchronized swimming
- Event(s): Women's duet Women's team
Medal record
Representing Netherlands
Olympic Games
Bronze medal – third place	2024 Paris	Duet
World Championships
Silver medal – second place	2024 Doha	Duet free routine
European Games
Silver medal – second place	2023 Kraków-Małopolska	Duet technical routine
European Championships
Gold medal – first place	2024 Belgrade	Duet free routine
Gold medal – first place	2024 Belgrade	Duet technical routine

Bregje de Brouwer (born 9 March 1999) is a Dutch synchronized swimmer. She competed in the 2020 Summer Olympics held in Tokyo, Japan. Her twin sister Noortje is her usual partner in pairs events. She is competing at the 2024 Paris Olympics in artistic swimming women's duet on 9 and 10 August 2024.
