= San Marino at the 2011 World Aquatics Championships =

Sporting event delegation

Flag of San Marino

San Marino competed at the 2011 World Aquatics Championships in Shanghai, China between July 16 and 31, 2011.

== Swimming ==
San Marino qualified 3 swimmers.

Men

Athlete	Event	Heats		Semifinals		Final	
Athlete	Event	Time	Rank	Time	Rank	Time	Rank
Emanuele Nicolini	Men's 200 m Freestyle	1:57.23	51	did not advance			
Emanuele Nicolini	Men's 400 m Freestyle	4:04.38	38			did not advance	

Women

Athlete	Event	Heats		Semifinals		Final	
Athlete	Event	Time	Rank	Time	Rank	Time	Rank
Clelia Tini	Women's 50 m Freestyle	27.15	41	did not advance			
Clelia Tini	Women's 100 m Freestyle	59.50	49	did not advance			
Simona Muccioli	Women's 100 m Butterfly	1:06.45	45	did not advance			
Simona Muccioli	Women's 200 m Butterfly	2:22.03	31	did not advance			

== Synchronised swimming ==
San Marino has qualified 2 athletes in synchronised swimming.

Women

Athlete	Event	Preliminary		Final	
Athlete	Event	Points	Rank	Points	Rank
Elena Tini	Solo Technical Routine	74.500	25	Did not advance	
Elena Tini	Solo Free Routine	72.430	24	did not advance	
Cristina Nicolini; Elena Tini	Duet Technical Routine	71.900	33	Did not advance	
Cristina Nicolini; Elena Tini	Duet Free Routine	73.640	32	did not advance	
