= Uzbekistan at the 2011 World Aquatics Championships =

Competing Team in the 2011 World Aquatics Championship

Flag of Uzbekistan

Uzbekistan competed at the 2011 World Aquatics Championships in Shanghai, China between July 16 and 31, 2011.

== Swimming ==
Uzbekistan qualified 4 swimmers.

Men

Athlete	Event	Heats		Semifinals		Final	
Athlete	Event	Time	Rank	Time	Rank	Time	Rank
Sobitjon Amilov	Men's 400m Freestyle	3:59.01	33			did not advance	
Sobitjon Amilov	Men's 800m Freestyle	8:27.35	45			did not advance	
Aleksey Derlyugov	Men's 200m IM	2:03.30	28	did not advance			
Aleksey Derlyugov	Men's 400m IM	4:27.19	26			did not advance	

Women

Athlete	Event	Heats		Semifinals		Final	
Athlete	Event	Time	Rank	Time	Rank	Time	Rank
Ranohon Amanova	Women's 200m Freestyle	2:02.89	37	did not advance			
Ranohon Amanova	Women's 200m IM	2:16.75	22	did not advance			
Yulduz Kuchkarova	Women's 100m Backstroke	1:02.98	33	did not advance			
Yulduz Kuchkarova	Women's 200m Backstroke	2:18.62	34	did not advance			

== Synchronised swimming ==
Uzbekistan has qualified 2 athletes in synchronised swimming.

Women

Athlete	Event	Preliminary		Final	
Athlete	Event	Points	Rank	Points	Rank
Anastasiya Ruzmetova	Solo Technical Routine	76.100	20	did not advance	
Anastasiya Ruzmetova; Anastasiya Zdraykovakaya	Duet Technical Routine	74.300	31	did not advance	
Anastasiya Ruzmetova; Anastasiya Zdraykovakaya	Duet Free Routine	75.060	31	did not advance	

== Water polo ==
=== Women ===
Team Roster

- Elena Dukhanova
- Daiana Dadabaeva
- Aleksandra Sarancha
- Eseniya Piftor
- Evgeniya Ivanova
- Liliya Umarova
- Natalya Plyusova – Captain
- Anna Sheglova
- Ramilya Halikova
- Ekaterina Morozova
- Anastasiya Osipenko
- Anna Plyusova
- Guzelya Hamitova

==== Group B ====
Team	Pld	W	D	L	GF	GA	GD	Pts
Canada	3	3	0	0	43	17	+26	6
Australia	3	2	0	1	46	16	+30	4
New Zealand	3	1	0	2	27	29	−2	2
Uzbekistan	3	0	0	3	14	68	−54	0

July 17, 2011; 13:30	Report	New Zealand	19–6	Uzbekistan	Shanghai Oriental Sports Center, Shanghai; Attendance: 450; Referees: Pinker (RSA); Borrell (ESP)
July 17, 2011; 13:30	Report	Score by quarters: 4–2, 5–1, 6–1, 4–2			Shanghai Oriental Sports Center, Shanghai; Attendance: 450; Referees: Pinker (RSA); Borrell (ESP)
July 17, 2011; 13:30	Report	Hudson 6	Goals	Halikova 3	Shanghai Oriental Sports Center, Shanghai; Attendance: 450; Referees: Pinker (RSA); Borrell (ESP)

July 19, 2011; 09:30	Report	Uzbekistan	6–22	Canada	Shanghai Oriental Sports Center, Shanghai; Attendance: 450; Referees: Menendez (CUB), Makita (JPN)
July 19, 2011; 09:30	Report	Score by quarters: 2–6, 1–6, 1–7, 2–3			Shanghai Oriental Sports Center, Shanghai; Attendance: 450; Referees: Menendez (CUB), Makita (JPN)
July 19, 2011; 09:30	Report	Sarancha 2	Goals	Alogbo 5	Shanghai Oriental Sports Center, Shanghai; Attendance: 450; Referees: Menendez (CUB), Makita (JPN)

July 21, 2011; 18:20	Report	Australia	27–2	Uzbekistan	Shanghai Oriental Sports Center, Shanghai; Attendance: 400; Referees: Wengenroth (SUI), Gonzalez (PUR)
July 21, 2011; 18:20	Report	Score by quarters: 3–1, 9–0, 6–1, 9–0			Shanghai Oriental Sports Center, Shanghai; Attendance: 400; Referees: Wengenroth (SUI), Gonzalez (PUR)
July 21, 2011; 18:20	Report	three players 4	Goals	Sarancha, Plyusova 1	Shanghai Oriental Sports Center, Shanghai; Attendance: 400; Referees: Wengenroth (SUI), Gonzalez (PUR)

==== Classification 13–16 ====
July 23, 2011; 09:30	Report	Kazakhstan	14–13	Uzbekistan	Shanghai Oriental Sports Center, Shanghai; Attendance: 450; Referees: Gonzalez (PUR), Juhaz (HUN)
July 23, 2011; 09:30	Report	Score by quarters: 4–2, 2–4, 4–2, 4–5			Shanghai Oriental Sports Center, Shanghai; Attendance: 450; Referees: Gonzalez (PUR), Juhaz (HUN)
July 23, 2011; 09:30	Report	Vassilyeva 4	Goals	Halikova 8	Shanghai Oriental Sports Center, Shanghai; Attendance: 450; Referees: Gonzalez (PUR), Juhaz (HUN)

==== Fifteenth place game ====
July 25, 2011; 8:40	Report	Uzbekistan	5–6	South Africa	Shanghai Oriental Sports Center, Shanghai; Attendance: 200; Referees: Gonzalez (PUR), Menendez (CUB)
July 25, 2011; 8:40	Report	Score by quarters: 0–1, 2–2, 2–1, 1–2			Shanghai Oriental Sports Center, Shanghai; Attendance: 200; Referees: Gonzalez (PUR), Menendez (CUB)
July 25, 2011; 8:40	Report	five players 1	Goals	Kay, Harris 2	Shanghai Oriental Sports Center, Shanghai; Attendance: 200; Referees: Gonzalez (PUR), Menendez (CUB)
