= Open water swimming at the 2023 World Aquatics Championships – Mixed 4 × 1500 metre relay =

Mixed 4 × 1500 metre open water relay at the 2023 World Aquatics Championships
- Venue: Seaside Momochi Beach Park
- Location: Fukuoka, Japan
- Dates: 20 July
- Competitors: 84 from 21 nations
- Teams: 21
- Winning time: 1:10:31.2

Medalists
gold medal	Barbara Pozzobon; Ginevra Taddeucci; Domenico Acerenza; Gregorio Paltrinieri	Italy
silver medal	Bettina Fábián; Anna Olasz; Kristóf Rasovszky; Dávid Betlehem	Hungary
bronze medal	Chelsea Gubecka; Moesha Johnson; Nicholas Sloman; Kyle Lee	Australia

The mixed 4 × 1500 metre relay event at the 2023 World Aquatics Championships was held on 20 July 2023 at the Seaside Momochi Beach Park in Fukuoka, Japan. Spain led the early portions of the race with male swimmers, before being overtaken by Australia, who started with female swimmers. Australia's Kyle Lee led at the final changeover, after which he was overtaken by Italy's Gregorio Paltrinieri and Hungary's Dávid Betlehem. Paltrinieri and Betlehem raced for the gold and silver over the final leg.

Paltrinieri finished first for Italy with a time of 1:10:31.2, Hungary finished second with 1:10:35.3, and Australia finished third with 1:11:26.9, two tenths of a second ahead of Germany in fourth. It was the first time Italy had won an open water team event at the World Championships.

== Event description ==
Each athlete swam 1500 m. The teams consisted of two men and two women, meaning each team completed 6 km in total. The men and women could swim in any order. Each World Aquatics member federation could enter one team.

== Background ==
Germany was considered the favourite going into the event, with Leonie Beck having won the women's 5 km and 10 km earlier in the programme. Germany's Florian Wellbrock, who won the individual men's 5 km and 10 km, did not compete in this event, in order to recover for the 1500 m and 800 m races in the pool the following week. It was the last event of the open water swimming programme at the Championships.

== Race ==
The race took place at 08:00 on 20 July at the Seaside Momochi Beach Park in Fukuoka, Japan. The water temperature was around 26.7 °C (80.1 °F) and the air temperature was about 25.4 °C (77.7 °F). The water conditions were rougher than in the other open water events at the Championships.

Spain took an early lead in the race with a male on the first leg. Spain led into the first changeover, while Australia's Chelsea Gubecka was the first female to finish the first leg. Australia's Moesha Johnson was the first woman to reach the second changeover, where she had a 13-second lead on the European nations who also decided to place women on the first two legs.

By the 3700-metre mark (700 metres into the third leg), Australia was leading the race with Nicholas Sloman, who was sixteen seconds ahead of Germany's Rob Muffels. Australia's Kyle Lee entered the water at the final changeover with a lead of seven seconds on Italy's Gregorio Paltrinieri and Hungary's Dávid Betlehem. Lee was overtaken by Paltrinieri and Betlehem, and Paltrinieri and Betlehem continued to race to the finish. Paltrinieri won for Italy with a time of 1:10:31.2, while Hungary finished second with 1:10:35.3. Australia finished third with 1:11.26.9, two tenths of a second ahead of Germany in fourth. A photo finish was needed to determine whether Australia or Germany won the bronze.

It was the first time Italy had won an open water team event at the World Championships.

Results
Rank	Nation	Swimmer (Note: Names ordered according to the order they swam in)	Time
1st place, gold medalist(s)	Italy	Barbara Pozzobon; Ginevra Taddeucci; Domenico Acerenza; Gregorio Paltrinieri	1:10:31.2
2nd place, silver medalist(s)	Hungary	Bettina Fábián; Anna Olasz; Kristóf Rasovszky; Dávid Betlehem	1:10:35.3
3rd place, bronze medalist(s)	Australia	Chelsea Gubecka; Moesha Johnson; Nicholas Sloman; Kyle Lee	1:11:26.7
4	Germany	Lea Boy; Leonie Beck; Rob Muffels; Oliver Klemet	1:11:26.9
5	France	Anastasiia Kirpichnikova; Logan Fontaine; Aurélie Muller; David Aubry	1:11:40.6
6	Brazil	Ana Marcela Cunha; Viviane Jungblut; Diogo Villarinho; Alexandre Finco	1:13:07.4
7	Japan	Airi Ebina; Kaito Tsujimori; Ichika Kajimoto; Kaiki Furuhata	1:13:38.5
8	Spain	Carlos Garach; Guillem Pujol; Ángela Martínez; Paula Otero	1:13:41.8
9	United States	Joey Tepper; Brennan Gravley; Mariah Denigan; Katie Grimes	1:13:58.6
10	Canada	Emma Finlin; Eric Hedlin; Bailey O'Regan; Eric Brown	1:14:11.8
11	China	Zhang Ziyang; Wang Kexin; Wu Shutong; Meng Rui	1:14:50.1
12	Argentina	Candela Giordanino; Cecilia Biagioli; Franco Cassini; Joaquín Moreno	1:14:53.7
13	Israel	Eva Fabian; Matan Roditi; Yonatan Ahdut; Orian Gablan	1:15:52.3
14	South Africa	Amica de Jager; Kate Beavon; Matthew Caldwell; Connor Buck	1:16:12.1
15	Mexico	Martha Sandoval; Paulo Strehlke; Paulina Alanís; Daniel Delgadillo	1:16:52.7
16	Czech Republic	Lenka Štěrbová; Ondřej Zach; Alena Benešová; Martin Straka	1:17:41.7
17	Kazakhstan	Diana Taszhanova; Galymzhan Balabek; Mariya Fedotova; Lev Cherepanov	1:17:41.8
18	South Korea	Park Jae-hun; Sung Jun-ho; Lee Hae-rim; Lee Jeong-min	1:19:28.7
19	Hong Kong	William Yan Thorley; Nikita Lam; Nip Tsz Yin; Keith Sin	1:19:31.8
20	Puerto Rico	Christian Bayo; Mariela Guadamuro; Alondra Quiles; Jamarr Bruno	1:23:31.2
21	Uzbekistan	Nikita Kornilov; Parizoda Iskandarova; Anastasiya Zelinskaya; Vyacheslav Shkretov	1:26:29.2

== Further information ==
- "Ranking Progression" (PDF). Omega Timing. 20 July 2023. Archived (PDF) from the original on 2 August 2024. – Graph comparing the placement of each team throughout the race
- "Open Water | Mixed 4x1500m Relay | World Aquatics Championships Fukuoka 2023". World Aquatics. 20 July 2023. Archived from the original on 29 October 2025. – Photo gallery from the event
- "Italy Win Mixed Open Water Relay Gold at Swimming Worlds". Xinhuanet. 20 July 2023. Archived from the original on 29 October 2025. – Another photo gallery from the event
- Ross, Andy (20 July 2023). "Italy Roars Home to Claim Open Water Mixed Team Relay Gold Ahead of Hungary and Australia". World Aquatics. Archived from the original on 8 July 2025. – Post-race quotes from the swimmers in the medalling teams
- "World Aquatics Open Water Championships Conclude with Mixed 4x1500m Relay". USA Swimming. 20 July 2023. Archived from the original on 29 October 2025. – Post-race quotes from the United States swimmers
- "Championnats Du Monde De Fukuoka : Le Relais D'Eau Libre Cinquième Mondial, Les Poloïstes En Huitièmes De Finale". French Swimming Federation. Archived from the original on 14 June 2024. – Includes the French Swimming Federation's report on the race and two post-race quotes from the French swimmers.
- "Freiwasserschwimmen: Deutsche Freiwasser-Staffel Verpasst Medaille Bei Schwimm-WM". Die Zeit (in German). Deutsche Presse-Agentur. 20 July 2023. ISSN 0044-2070. Archived from the original on 26 July 2023. – Report on the German performance
- Retico, Alessandra (20 July 2023). "Fukuoka Swimming World Championships: Italy Gold in the 4x1.5 km relay". la Repubblica. ISSN 0390-1076. OCLC 642673598. Archived from the original on 29 October 2025. – Further details on the Italian race and post-race quotes from the Italian team
