= Czech Republic at the 2015 World Aquatics Championships =

- Flag of the Czech Republic
- World Aquatics code: CZE
- National federation: Český svaz plaveckých sportů
- Website: plavani.cstv.cz

in Kazan, Russia
- Competitors: 24 in 4 sports
- Medals: Gold 0 Silver 0 Bronze 0 Total 0

World Aquatics Championships appearances
- 1994; 1998; 2001; 2003; 2005; 2007; 2009; 2011; 2013; 2015; 2017; 2019; 2022; 2023; 2024; 2025

Other related appearances
- Czechoslovakia (1973–1991)

Czech Republic competed at the 2015 World Aquatics Championships in Kazan, Russia from 24 July to 9 August 2015.

== High diving ==
Czech Republic has qualified one high diver.

Athlete	Event	Points	Rank
Michal Navrátil	Men's high diving	564.35	8

== Open water swimming ==
Czech Republic fielded a full team of six swimmers to compete in the open water marathon.

Men

Athlete	Event	Time	Rank
Vít Ingeduld	5 km	55:38.5	29
Vít Ingeduld	25 km	5:13:11.0	19
Matěj Kozubek	10 km	1:56:34.2	54
Matěj Kozubek	25 km	5:05:22.3	15
Ján Kútnik	5 km	55:28.8	18
Ján Kútnik	10 km	1:52:56.8	37

Women

Athlete	Event	Time	Rank
Alena Benešová	5 km	1:00:50.3	18
Alena Benešová	10 km	2:00:12.4	30
Silvie Rybářová	25 km	did not finish	
Lenka Štěrbová	25 km	5:36:09.9	15

Mixed

Athlete	Event	Time	Rank
Alena Benešová; Matěj Kozubek; Ján Kútnik	Team	59:43.1	17

== Swimming ==
Czech swimmers earned qualifying standards in the following events (up to a maximum of 2 swimmers in each event at the A-standard entry time, and 1 at the B-standard):

Men

Athlete	Event	Heat		Semifinal		Final	
Athlete	Event	Time	Rank	Time	Rank	Time	Rank
Petr Bartůněk	50 m breaststroke	28.47	38	did not advance			
Petr Bartůněk	100 m breaststroke	1:02.90	46	did not advance			
Roman Dmytrijev	200 m backstroke	2:01.49	27	did not advance			
Pavel Janeček	200 m freestyle	1:50.95	45	did not advance			
Pavel Janeček	200 m individual medley	2:02.43	22	did not advance			
Pavel Janeček	400 m individual medley	4:20.43	22	—N/a		did not advance	
Jan Micka	400 m freestyle	3:53.79	43	—N/a		did not advance	
Jan Micka	800 m freestyle	8:05.76	30	—N/a		did not advance	
Jan Micka	1500 m freestyle	15:22.16	23	—N/a		did not advance	
Jan Šefl	50 m butterfly	24.34	36	did not advance			
Jan Šefl	100 m butterfly	53.21	33	did not advance			
Jan Šefl	200 m butterfly	1:57.63	17	did not advance			
Martin Verner	100 m freestyle	50.01	40	did not advance			
Petr Bartůněk; Roman Dmytrijev; Jan Šefl; Martin Verner	4×100 m medley relay	3:44.21	24	—N/a		did not advance	

Women

Athlete	Event	Heat		Semifinal		Final	
Athlete	Event	Time	Rank	Time	Rank	Time	Rank
Simona Baumrtová	50 m backstroke	28.67	20	did not advance			
Simona Baumrtová	100 m backstroke	1:00.91	20	did not advance			
Simona Baumrtová	200 m backstroke	2:11.78	19	did not advance			
Petra Chocová	50 m breaststroke	31.21	15 Q	31.40	16	did not advance	
Petra Chocová	100 m breaststroke	1:08.09	24	did not advance			
Martina Elhenická	400 m freestyle	4:18.57	30	—N/a		did not advance	
Martina Elhenická	800 m freestyle	8:53.08	30	—N/a		did not advance	
Martina Elhenická	1500 m freestyle	16:50.22	22	—N/a		did not advance	
Anna Kolářová	50 m freestyle	25.67	34	did not advance			
Anna Kolářová	100 m freestyle	55.26	26	did not advance			
Anna Kolářová	200 m freestyle	2:00.24	25	did not advance			
Martina Moravčíková	200 m breaststroke	2:28.41	22	did not advance			
Lucie Svěcená	100 m butterfly	1:00.16	=34	did not advance			
Barbora Závadová	200 m butterfly	2:12.89	25	did not advance			
Barbora Závadová	200 m individual medley	2:13.12	14 Q	2:11.97	12	did not advance	
Barbora Závadová	400 m individual medley	4:35.60	2 Q	—N/a		4:36.73	5
Simona Baumrtová; Anna Kolářová; Martina Moravčíková; Lucie Svěcená	4×100 m medley relay	4:03.44	15	—N/a		did not advance	

== Synchronized swimming ==
Czech Republic has qualified four synchronized swimmers.

Women

Athlete	Event	Preliminaries		Final	
Athlete	Event	Points	Rank	Points	Rank
Soňa Bernardová	Solo technical routine	80.0377	13	did not advance	
Soňa Bernardová; Alžběta Dufková	Duet technical routine	80.6425	16	did not advance	
Soňa Bernardová; Alžběta Dufková	Duet free routine	82.4000	15	did not advance	

Mixed

Athlete	Event	Preliminaries		Final	
Athlete	Event	Points	Rank	Points	Rank
Ondřej Cibulka; Sabina Holubová	Duet free routine	73.7000	10 Q	71.5667	10
