= Open water swimming at the 2020 European Aquatics Championships – Women's 10 km =

Women's 10 km at the 2020 European Aquatics Championships
- Venue: Lupa Lake
- Dates: 13 May 2021
- Competitors: 25 from 16 nations
- Winning time: 1:59:12.7

Medalists
gold medal	Sharon van Rouwendaal	Netherlands
silver medal	Anna Olasz	Hungary
bronze medal	Rachele Bruni	Italy

The Women's 10 km competition of the 2020 European Aquatics Championships was held on 13 May 2021.

== Results ==
The race was held at 10:00.

Rank	Swimmer	Nationality	Time
1st place, gold medalist(s)	Sharon van Rouwendaal	Netherlands	1:59:12.7
2nd place, silver medalist(s)	Anna Olasz	Hungary	1:59:13.0
3rd place, bronze medalist(s)	Rachele Bruni	Italy	1:59:15.1
4	Paula Ruiz	Spain	1:59:15.5
5	Giulia Gabbrielleschi	Italy	1:59:16.2
6	Angélica André	Portugal	1:59:18.0
7	Ginevra Taddeucci	Italy	1:59:19.1
8	Anastasiya Kirpichnikova	Russia	1:59:19.3
9	Lara Grangeon	France	1:59:21.8
10	Réka Rohács	Hungary	1:59:33.2
11	Alena Benešová	Czech Republic	2:01:05.3
12	Ekaterina Sorokina	Russia	2:02:01.3
13	Kata Sömenek Onon	Hungary	2:02:03.9
14	Océane Cassignol	France	2:02:46.8
15	Emily Clarke	Great Britain	2:03:24.6
16	Lea Boy	Germany	2:03:49.4
17	Johanna Enkner	Austria	2:04:50.9
18	Špela Perše	Slovenia	2:05:14.6
19	Julie Pleskotová	Czech Republic	2:07:35.1
20	Eva Fabian	Israel	2:08:37.9
21	Lenka Štěrbová	Czech Republic	2:10:15.7
22	Lærke Toft Ruby	Denmark	2:11:06.5
23	Nefeli Giannopoulou	Greece	2:11:07.8
	Valeriia Ermakova	Russia	DNF
	Krystyna Panchishko	Ukraine	DNF
	Leonie Beck	Germany	DNS
