= Czech Republic at the 2017 World Aquatics Championships =

- Flag of the Czech Republic
- World Aquatics code: CZE
- National federation: Český svaz plaveckých sportů
- Website: plavani.cstv.cz

in Budapest, Hungary
- Competitors: 21 in 4 sports
- Medals Ranked 22nd: Gold 0 Silver 1 Bronze 0 Total 1

World Aquatics Championships appearances
- 1994; 1998; 2001; 2003; 2005; 2007; 2009; 2011; 2013; 2015; 2017; 2019; 2022; 2023; 2024; 2025

Other related appearances
- Czechoslovakia (1973–1991)

Czech Republic is scheduled to compete at the 2017 World Aquatics Championships in Budapest, Hungary from 14 July to 30 July.

== Medalists ==
Medal	Name	Sport	Event	Date
Silver	Michal Navrátil	High diving	Men's high diving	July 30

== High diving ==
Czech Republic qualified one male high diver.

Athlete	Event	Points	Rank
Michal Navrátil	Men's high diving	390.90	2nd place, silver medalist(s)

== Open water swimming ==
The Czech Republic has entered four open water swimmers

Athlete	Event	Time	Rank
Vít Ingeduld	Men's 5 km	55:54.8	41
Vít Ingeduld	Men's 10 km	1:57:59.8	46
Matěj Kozubek	Men's 5 km	55:39.1	35
Matěj Kozubek	Men's 10 km	1:54:24.6	33
Matěj Kozubek	Men's 25 km	5:13:17.0	18
Alena Benešová	Women's 5 km	1:01:14.7	22
Alena Benešová	Women's 10 km	2:07:58.5	36
Lenka Štěrbová	Women's 5 km	1:01:27.9	26
Lenka Štěrbová	Women's 10 km	2:08:32.9	37
Lenka Štěrbová	Women's 25 km	5:33:04.6	11
Alena Benešová; Lenka Štěrbová; Vít Ingeduld; Matěj Kozubek	Mixed team	58:32.2	16

== Swimming ==
Czech swimmers have achieved qualifying standards in the following events (up to a maximum of 2 swimmers in each event at the A-standard entry time, and 1 at the B-standard):

Men

Athlete	Event	Heat		Semifinal		Final	
Athlete	Event	Time	Rank	Time	Rank	Time	Rank
Roman Dmytrijev	200 m backstroke	2:01.38	30	did not advance			
Tomáš Havránek	200 m butterfly	2:01.50	32	did not advance			
Pavel Janeček	200 m individual medley	2:03.87	31	did not advance			
Pavel Janeček	400 m individual medley	4:22.11	25	—N/a		did not advance	
Jan Micka	400 m freestyle	3:53.06	28	—N/a		did not advance	
Jan Micka	800 m freestyle	7:56.71	16	—N/a		did not advance	
Jan Micka	1500 m freestyle	14:55.47 NR	4 Q	—N/a		15:09.28	8
Jan Šefl	50 m butterfly	24.09	=28	did not advance			
Jan Šefl	100 m butterfly	52.65	26	did not advance			

Women

Athlete	Event	Heat		Semifinal		Final	
Athlete	Event	Time	Rank	Time	Rank	Time	Rank
Simona Baumrtová	50 m backstroke	28.15	15 Q	28.03	14	did not advance	
Simona Baumrtová	100 m backstroke	1:00.28	12 Q	59.65 NR	6 Q	59.71	7
Simona Baumrtová	200 m backstroke	2:11.80	17	did not advance			
Simona Baumrtová	200 m individual medley	2:14.26	23	did not advance			
Petra Chocová	50 m breaststroke	31.69	22	did not advance			
Martina Elhenická	800 m freestyle	8:52.39	24	—N/a		did not advance	
Martina Elhenická	1500 m freestyle	17:04.63	18	—N/a		did not advance	
Anna Kolářová	50 m freestyle	25.56	27	did not advance			
Anna Kolářová	100 m freestyle	55.73	26	did not advance			
Anna Kolářová	200 m freestyle	2:02.99	29	did not advance			
Martina Moravčíková	100 m breaststroke	1:07.69	19	did not advance			
Martina Moravčíková	200 m breaststroke	2:25.26	8 Q	2:25.67	13	did not advance	
Lucie Svěcená	50 m butterfly	26.90	28	did not advance			
Lucie Svěcená	100 m butterfly	1:00.34	26	did not advance			
Barbora Závadová	400 m freestyle	4:13.85	17	—N/a		did not advance	
Barbora Závadová	200 m butterfly	2:12.09	23	did not advance			
Barbora Závadová	400 m individual medley	4:46.75	18	—N/a		did not advance	
Simona Baumrtová; Anna Kolářová; Martina Moravčíková; Lucie Svěcená	4×100 m medley relay	4:02.23	9	—N/a		did not advance	

== Synchronized swimming ==
Czech Republic's synchronized swimming team consisted of 4 athletes (4 female).

Women

Athlete	Event	Preliminaries		Final	
Athlete	Event	Points	Rank	Points	Rank
Alžběta Dufková; Sabina Langerová	Duet technical routine	77.8287	20	did not advance	
Alžběta Dufková; Sabina Langerová	Duet free routine	79.2667	23	did not advance	

Legend: (R) = Reserve Athlete
