= Open water swimming at the 2023 World Aquatics Championships – Women's 5 km =

Women's 5 km at the 2023 World Aquatics Championships
- Venue: Seaside Momochi Beach Park
- Location: Fukuoka, Japan
- Dates: 18 July
- Competitors: 59 from 39 nations
- Winning time: 59:31.7

Medalists
gold medal	Leonie Beck	Germany
silver medal	Sharon van Rouwendaal	Netherlands
bronze medal	Ana Marcela Cunha	Brazil

The women's 5 km competition at the 2023 World Aquatics Championships was held on 18 July 2023.

== Results ==
The race was started at 08:00.

Rank	Swimmer	Nationality	Time
1st place, gold medalist(s)	Leonie Beck	Germany	59:31.7
2nd place, silver medalist(s)	Sharon van Rouwendaal	Netherlands	59:32.7
3rd place, bronze medalist(s)	Ana Marcela Cunha	Brazil	59:33.9
4	Angélica André	Portugal	59:35.6
5	Barbara Pozzobon	Italy	59:35.8
6	Viviane Jungblut	Brazil	59:38.2
7	Aurélie Muller	France	59:40.1
8	Bettina Fábián	Hungary	59:44.2
9	Mafalda Rosa	Portugal	59:44.6
10	Moesha Johnson	Australia	59:46.3
11	Anastasiia Kirpichnikova	France	59:46.4
12	Ángela Martínez	Spain	59:50.3
13	Jeannette Spiwoks	Germany	1:00:05.1
14	Ichika Kajimoto	Japan	1:00:56.4
15	María Bramont-Arias	Peru	1:01:09.4
16	Anna Olasz	Hungary	1:01:09.4
17	Eva Fabian	Israel	1:01:11.4
18	Mariah Denigan	United States	1:01:18.3
19	Wang Kexin	China	1:01:19.6
20	Bianca Crisp	Australia	1:01:19.8
21	Rachele Bruni	Italy	1:01:24.2
22	Candela Sánchez	Spain	1:01:25.3
23	Špela Perše	Slovenia	1:01:25.6
24	Amica de Jager	South Africa	1:01:28.9
25	Chantal Liew	Singapore	1:01:29.3
26	Lenka Štěrbová	Czech Republic	1:01:46.7
27	Nefeli Giannopoulou	Greece	1:01:48.6
28	Nip Tsz Yin	Hong Kong	1:02:15.7
29	Candela Giordanino	Argentina	1:02:24.7
30	Diana Taszhanova	Kazakhstan	1:02:25.9
31	Teng Yu-wen	Chinese Taipei	1:02:26.5
32	Martha Sandoval	Mexico	1:02:26.6
33	Bailey O'Regan	Canada	1:02:27.0
34	Lamees El-Sokkary	Egypt	1:02:28.1
35	Miku Kojima	Japan	1:02:28.8
36	Ma Xiaoming	China	1:02:29.0
37	Alena Benešová	Czech Republic	1:02:29.4
38	Lee Jeong-min	South Korea	1:02:30.1
39	Lee Hae-rim	South Korea	1:02:33.9
40	Nikita Lam	Hong Kong	1:02:34.7
41	Amber Keegan	Great Britain	1:02:35.5
42	Kate Beavon	South Africa	1:02:46.5
43	Klara Bošnjak	Croatia	1:03:12.3
44	Alejandra Hoyos	Mexico	1:05:55.5
45	Mariya Fedotova	Kazakhstan	1:05:57.4
46	Nadine Karim	Egypt	1:05:59.2
47	Britta Schwengle	Aruba	1:06:49.5
48	Orian Gablan	Israel	1:06:57.1
49	Alondra Quiles	Puerto Rico	1:07:14.4
50	Anastasiya Zelinskaya	Uzbekistan	1:07:15.9
51	Malak Meqdar	Morocco	1:07:16.2
52	Mariela Guadamuro	Puerto Rico	1:10:32.8
53	María Porres	Guatemala	1:11:37.8
54	Bangalore Mahesh Rithika	India	1:12:23.2
55	Sofie Frichot	Seychelles	1:13:46.0
	Kisha Jiménez	Costa Rica	OTL
	Rafaela Santo	Angola	OTL
	Swagiah Mubiru	Uganda	OTL
	Fátima Portillo	El Salvador	DNS
	Sabrina Condori	Bolivia	DNS
	Parizoda Iskandarova	Uzbekistan	DSQ
