= Czech Republic at the 2025 World Aquatics Championships =

- Flag of Czech Republic
- World Aquatics code: CZE

in Singapore
- Competitors: 15 in 4 sports
- Medals: Gold 0 Silver 0 Bronze 0 Total 0

World Aquatics Championships appearances
- 1994; 1998; 2001; 2003; 2005; 2007; 2009; 2011; 2013; 2015; 2017; 2019; 2022; 2023; 2024; 2025

Other related appearances
- Czechoslovakia (1973–1991)

Czech Republic are competing at the 2025 World Aquatics Championships in Singapore from July 11 to August 3, 2025.

== Athletes by discipline ==
The following is the number of competitors who will participate at the Championships per discipline.

| Sport | Men | Women | Total |
|---|---|---|---|
| Artistic swimming | 0 | 2 | 2 |
| Diving | 0 | 2 | 2 |
| Open water swimming | 1 | 2 | 3 |
| Swimming | 4 | 4 | 8 |
| Total | 5 | 10 | 15 |

== Artistic swimming ==
Women

| Athlete | Event | Preliminaries | | Final | |
| Athlete | Event | Points | Rank | Points | Rank |
|---|---|---|---|---|---|
| Julie Lewczyszynová; Sofie Schindlerová | Duet technical routine | 217.4508 | 28 | Did not advance | |
| Julie Lewczyszynová; Sofie Schindlerová | Duet free routine | 192.4092 | 25 | Did not advance | |

== Diving ==
Women

| Athlete | Event | Preliminaries | | Semi-finals | | Final | |
| Athlete | Event | Points | Rank | Points | Rank | Points | Rank |
|---|---|---|---|---|---|---|---|
| Tereza Jelínková | 1 m springboard | 217.20 | 26 | — | | Did not advance | |
| Ivana Medková | 1 m springboard | 177.15 | 47 | — | | Did not advance | |
| Tereza Jelínková | 3 m springboard | 237.70 | 30 | Did not advance | | | |
| Ivana Medková | 3 m springboard | 182.55 | 48 | Did not advance | | | |
| Tereza Jelínková; Ivana Medková | 3 m synchronized springboard | 206.31 | 17 | — | | Did not advance | |

== Open water swimming ==
Men

| Athlete | Event | Heats | | Semifinal | | Final | |
| Athlete | Event | Time | Rank | Time | Rank | Time | Rank |
|---|---|---|---|---|---|---|---|
| Martin Straka | Men's 3 km knockout sprints | 17:06.2 | 4 Q | 11:31.9 | 8 | 6:08.6 | 9 |
| Martin Straka | Men's 5 km | — | | | | 58:12.5 | 15 |
| Martin Straka | Men's 10 km | — | | | | 2:03:29.0 | 18 |

Women

| Athlete | Event | Heats | | Semifinal | | Final | |
| Athlete | Event | Time | Rank | Time | Rank | Time | Rank |
|---|---|---|---|---|---|---|---|
| Alena Benešová | Women's 3 km knockout sprints | 18:39.2 | 12 | Did not advance | | | |
| Julie Pleskotová | Women's 3 km knockout sprints | 18:16.3 | 11 | Did not advance | | | |
| Alena Benešová | Women's 5 km | — | | | | 1:06:31.0 | 29 |
| Julie Pleskotová | Women's 5 km | — | | | | 1:04:35.3 | 18 |
| Alena Benešová | Women's 10 km | — | | | | 2:20:39.9 | 30 |
| Julie Pleskotová | Women's 10 km | — | | | | 2:18:02.5 | 23 |

== Swimming ==
Men

| Athlete | Event | Heat | | Semi-final | | Final | |
| Athlete | Event | Time | Rank | Time | Rank | Time | Rank |
|---|---|---|---|---|---|---|---|
| Jakub Bursa | 200 m individual medley | 2:01.93 | 30 | Did not advance | | | |
| Jakub Bursa | 400 m individual medley | 4:22.28 | 23 | — | | Did not advance | |
| Jan Čejka | 200 m backstroke | 1:56.79 | 11 Q | 1:55.46 NR | 7 Q | 1:55.37 NR | 6 |
| Miroslav Knedla | 50 m backstroke | 24.52 NR | 3 Q | 24.61 | 9 | Did not advance | |
| Miroslav Knedla | 100 m backstroke | 53.59 | 12 Q | 53.15 NR | 12 | Did not advance | |
| Jakub Krischke | 50 m freestyle | 22.79 | 50 | Did not advance | | | |
| Jakub Krischke | 50 m backstroke | 25.34 | 25.34 | Did not advance | | | |

Women

| Athlete | Event | Heat | | Semi-final | | Final | |
| Athlete | Event | Time | Rank | Time | Rank | Time | Rank |
|---|---|---|---|---|---|---|---|
| Kristýna Horská | 100 m breaststroke | 1:08.79 | 34 | Did not advance | | | |
| Kristýna Horská | 200 m breaststroke | 2:26.29 | 13 Q | 2:25.95 | 13 | Did not advance | |
| Barbora Janíčková | 50 m freestyle | 24.98 | 19 | Did not advance | | | |
| Barbora Janíčková | 100 m freestyle | 54.38 | 16 Q | 53.60 | 9 | Did not advance | |
| Barbora Janíčková | 100 m butterfly | 59.97 | 31 | Did not advance | | | |
| Daryna Nabojčenko | 50 m butterfly | 26.16 | 19 | Did not advance | | | |
| Barbora Seemanová | 100 m freestyle | 53.94 | 9 Q | 53.72 | 10 | Did not advance | |
| Barbora Seemanová | 200 m freestyle | 1:57.13 | 5 Q | 1:55.63 | 4 Q | 1:55.20 | 5 |
