= Open water swimming at the 2023 World Aquatics Championships – Women's 10 km =

Women's 10 km at the 2023 World Aquatics Championships
- Venue: Seaside Momochi Beach Park
- Location: Fukuoka, Japan
- Dates: 15 July
- Competitors: 61 from 37 nations
- Winning time: 2:02:34.0

Medalists
gold medal	Leonie Beck	Germany
silver medal	Chelsea Gubecka	Australia
bronze medal	Katie Grimes	United States

The women's 10 km competition at the 2023 World Aquatics Championships was held on 15 July 2023.

== Results ==
The race was held at 08:00.

Rank	Swimmer	Nationality	Time
1st place, gold medalist(s)	Leonie Beck	Germany	2:02:34.0
2nd place, silver medalist(s)	Chelsea Gubecka	Australia	2:02:38.1
3rd place, bronze medalist(s)	Katie Grimes	United States	2:02:42.3
4	Sharon van Rouwendaal	Netherlands	2:02:42.4
5	Ana Marcela Cunha	Brazil	2:02:42.5
6	Ginevra Taddeucci	Italy	2:02:46.7
7	Lea Boy	Germany	2:03:12.9
8	Mariah Denigan	United States	2:03:13.5
9	Bettina Fábián	Hungary	2:03:15.2
10	Giulia Gabbrielleschi	Italy	2:03:15.7
11	Ángela Martínez	Spain	2:03:16.5
12	Anna Olasz	Hungary	2:03:16.9
13	Anastasiia Kirpichnikova	France	2:03:17.6
14	Candela Sánchez	Spain	2:03:18.2
15	Angélica André	Portugal	2:03:18.9
16	Océane Cassignol	France	2:03:25.5
17	Mafalda Rosa	Portugal	2:03:25.9
18	Amber Keegan	Great Britain	2:03:30.3
19	Martha Sandoval	Mexico	2:03:44.8
20	Cecilia Biagioli	Argentina	2:03:47.2
21	Špela Perše	Slovenia	2:03:48.2
22	María Bramont-Arias	Peru	2:04:11.9
23	Maddy Gough	Australia	2:04:18.6
24	Leah Crisp	Great Britain	2:05:03.5
25	Eva Fabian	Israel	2:05:05.0
26	Viviane Jungblut	Brazil	2:05:05.8
27	Sun Jiake	China	2:05:06.1
28	Airi Ebina	Japan	2:05:08.4
29	Nip Tsz Yin	Hong Kong	2:07:06.3
30	Emma Finlin	Canada	2:07:09.5
31	Paola Pérez	Venezuela	2:07:11.7
32	Alena Benešová	Czech Republic	2:07:24.3
33	Hanano Kato	Japan	2:07:26.4
34	Chantal Liew	Singapore	2:07:48.5
35	Wu Shutong	China	2:08:56.7
36	Candela Giordanino	Argentina	2:09:07.2
37	Lenka Štěrbová	Czech Republic	2:09:36.5
38	Bailey O'Regan	Canada	2:10:08.1
39	Nikita Lam	Hong Kong	2:10:08.8
40	Amica de Jager	South Africa	2:10:31.9
41	Teng Yu-wen	Chinese Taipei	2:11:11.1
42	Lee Hae-rim	South Korea	2:12:43.0
43	Lamees El-Sokkary	Egypt	2:12:49.6
44	Paulina Alanís	Mexico	2:13:16.7
44	Diana Taszhanova	Kazakhstan	2:13:16.7
46	Nadine Karim	Egypt	2:13:29.1
47	Lee Jeong-min	South Korea	2:13:41.0
48	Pimpun Choopong	Thailand	2:18:23.0
49	Britta Schwengle	Aruba	2:19:11.9
50	Anastasiya Zelinskaya	Uzbekistan	2:19:13.5
51	Tory Earle	South Africa	2:19:27.7
52	María Porres	Guatemala	2:21:58.3
53	Thitirat Charoensup	Thailand	2:22:17.3
54	Mariya Fedotova	Kazakhstan	2:22:57.6
55	Mariela Guadamuro	Puerto Rico	2:23:34.8
56	Alondra Quiles	Puerto Rico	2:25:07.9
57	Ashmitha Chandra	India	2:27:58.7
	Sofie Frichot	Seychelles	OTL
	Parizoda Iskandarova	Uzbekistan	OTL
	Kisha Jiménez	Costa Rica	OTL
	Fernanda Ramírez	Bolivia	OTL
	Fátima Portillo	El Salvador	DNS
