= Open water swimming at the 2022 European Aquatics Championships – Women's 10 km =

European sporting event

Women's 10 km at the 2022 European Aquatics Championships
- Venue: Ostia
- Dates: 21 August
- Competitors: 23 from 13 nations
- Winning time: 2:01:13.4

Medalists
| gold medal | Leonie Beck | Germany |
| silver medal | Ginevra Taddeucci | Italy |
| bronze medal | Angélica André | Portugal |

The Women's 10 km competition of the 2022 European Aquatics Championships was held on 21 August.

== Results ==
The race was started at 10:00.

| Rank | Swimmer | Nationality | Time |
|---|---|---|---|
| 1st place, gold medalist(s) | Leonie Beck | Germany | 2:01:13.4 |
| 2nd place, silver medalist(s) | Ginevra Taddeucci | Italy | 2:01:15.2 |
| 3rd place, bronze medalist(s) | Angélica André | Portugal | 2:01:16.4 |
| 4 | Sharon van Rouwendaal | Netherlands | 2:01:16.6 |
| 5 | Rachele Bruni | Italy | 2:01:31.5 |
| 6 | Anna Olasz | Hungary | 2:01:33.4 |
| 7 | Giulia Gabbrielleschi | Italy | 2:02:09.3 |
| 8 | Madelon Catteau | France | 2:02:17.7 |
| 9 | Aurélie Muller | France | 2:02:21.6 |
| 10 | Réka Rohács | Hungary | 2:03:22.3 |
| 11 | María de Valdés | Spain | 2:03:25.9 |
| 12 | Alena Benešová | Czech Republic | 2:03:28.8 |
| 13 | Lea Boy | Germany | 2:04:44.3 |
| 14 | Špela Perše | Slovenia | 2:06:10.8 |
| 15 | Vivien Balogh | Hungary | 2:07:11.2 |
| 16 | Ángela Martínez | Spain | 2:07:13.4 |
| 17 | Eva Fabian | Israel | 2:07:23.8 |
| 18 | Mafalda Rosa | Portugal | 2:07:36.3 |
| 19 | Ella Dyson | Great Britain | 2:07:53.1 |
| 20 | Arianna Valloni | San Marino | 2:13:27.5 |
| 21 | Fleur Lewis | Great Britain | 2:13:30.1 |
| | Nefeli Giannopoulou | Greece | DNF |
| | Jeannette Spiwoks | Germany | DNF |
| | Klaudia Tarasiewicz | Poland | DNS |
