= Open water swimming at the 2019 World Aquatics Championships – Women's 5 km =

Women's 5 km at the 2019 World Aquatics Championships
- Venue: Yeosu Expo Ocean Park
- Location: Gwangju, South Korea
- Dates: 17 July
- Competitors: 54 from 35 nations
- Winning time: 57:56.0

Medalists
gold medal	Ana Marcela Cunha	Brazil
silver medal	Aurélie Muller	France
bronze medal	Hannah Moore	United States
bronze medal	Leonie Beck	Germany

The Women's 5 km competition at the 2019 World Aquatics Championships was held on 17 July 2019.

== Results ==
The race was started at 08:00.

Results
Rank	Swimmer	Nationality	Time
1st place, gold medalist(s)	Ana Marcela Cunha	Brazil	57:56.0
2nd place, silver medalist(s)	Aurélie Muller	France	57:57.0
3rd place, bronze medalist(s)	Hannah Moore	United States	57:58.0
3rd place, bronze medalist(s)	Leonie Beck	Germany	57:58.0
5	Rachele Bruni	Italy	57:58.7
6	Giulia Gabbrielleschi	Italy	57:59.0
7	Ashley Twichell	United States	58:00.0
8	Hou Yawen	China	58:00.9
9	Lara Grangeon	France	58:01.5
10	María Bramont-Arias	Peru	58:09.1
11	Sharon van Rouwendaal	Netherlands	58:11.6
12	Angélica André	Portugal	58:11.8
13	Paula Ruiz	Spain	58:11.9
14	María de Valdés Álvarez	Spain	58:12.0
15	Finnia Wunram	Germany	58:12.0
16	Špela Perše	Slovenia	58:12.1
17	Anna Olasz	Hungary	58:12.2
18	Réka Rohács	Hungary	58:14.8
19	Kalliopi Araouzou	Greece	58:17.2
20	Mariia Novikova	Russia	58:17.3
21	Viviane Jungblut	Brazil	58:17.4
22	Valeriia Ermakova	Russia	58:17.5
23	Yan Siyu	China	58:17.6
24	Kate Sanderson	Canada	58:17.7
25	Alena Benešová	Czech Republic	58:17.8
26	Julia Arino	Argentina	58:17.9
27	Eva Fabian	Israel	58:18.0
28	Chantel Jeffrey	Canada	58:18.1
29	Krystyna Panchishko	Ukraine	59:44.0
30	Chloe Gubecka	Australia	59:50.6
31	Martha Sandoval	Mexico	59:51.3
32	Michelle Weber	South Africa	59:54.6
33	Mackenzie Brazier	Australia	59:56.1
34	Justyna Burska	Poland	1:01:33.7
35	Eden Girloanta	Israel	1:01:37.1
36	Lenka Štěrbová	Czech Republic	1:01:39.1
37	Liliana Hernández	Venezuela	1:01:39.2
38	Sandy Atef	Egypt	1:01:39.2
39	Paola Pérez	Venezuela	1:01:39.4
40	Karolína Balážiková	Slovakia	1:01:40.6
41	Nataly Caldas	Ecuador	1:01:41.9
42	Robyn Kinghorn	South Africa	1:01:50.0
43	Maisie Macartney	Great Britain	1:01:50.5
44	Nip Tsz Yin	Hong Kong	1:02:00.0
45	Lourdes Sandoval	Mexico	1:02:00.5
46	Ban Seon-jae	South Korea	1:04:26.9
47	Wong Cho Ying	Hong Kong	1:04:39.3
48	Lee Jeong-min	South Korea	1:04:47.0
49	Mariya Fedotova	Kazakhstan	1:06:24.0
50	Yanci Vanegas	Guatemala	1:06:24.4
51	Ana Abad	Ecuador	1:07:09.3
52	Camila Mercado	Bolivia	1:11:17.4
53	Merle Liivand	Estonia	1:11:19.5
54	Genesis Rojas	Costa Rica	1:12:55.7
