= Czech Republic at the 2019 World Aquatics Championships =

- Flag of the Czech Republic
- World Aquatics code: CZE
- National federation: Czech Swimming Federation
- Website: czechswimming.cz (in Czech)

in Gwangju, South Korea
- Medals: Gold 0 Silver 0 Bronze 0 Total 0

World Aquatics Championships appearances
- 1994; 1998; 2001; 2003; 2005; 2007; 2009; 2011; 2013; 2015; 2017; 2019; 2022; 2023; 2024; 2025

Other related appearances
- Czechoslovakia (1973–1991)

The Czech Republic competed at the 2019 World Aquatics Championships in Gwangju, South Korea from 12 to 28 July.

== Artistic swimming ==
The Czech Republic's artistic swimming team consisted of 4 athletes (4 female).

Women

Athlete	Event	Preliminaries		Final	
Athlete	Event	Points	Rank	Points	Rank
Alzbeta Dufkova	Solo technical routine	75.8189	17	did not advance	
Alzbeta Dufkova	Solo free routine	78.4333	17	did not advance	
Karolina Kluskova; Aneta Mrazkova	Duet technical routine	74.5514	32	did not advance	
Alzbeta Dufkova; Vendula Mazankova	Duet free routine	76.8667	25	did not advance	

== High diving ==
The Czech Republic qualified one male high diver.

Athlete	Event	Points	Rank
Michal Navrátil	Men's high diving	380.80	4

== Open water swimming ==
Czech Republic qualified two male and two female open water swimmers.

Men

Athlete	Event	Time	Rank
Vít Ingeduld	5 km	53:46.1	30
Vít Ingeduld	10 km	1:50:24.9	41
Matěj Kozubek	5 km	53:33.6	4
Matěj Kozubek	10 km	1:48:19.1	16
Matěj Kozubek	25 km	4:54:27.5	11

Women

Athlete	Event	Time	Rank
Alena Benešová	5 km	58:17.8	25
Alena Benešová	10 km	1:57:48.6	34
Lenka Štěrbová	5 km	1:01:39.1	36
Lenka Štěrbová	10 km	2:01:15.5	40
Lenka Štěrbová	25 km	5:45:19.3	15

== Swimming ==
Czech Republic entered seven swimmers.

Men

Athlete	Event	Heat		Semifinal		Final	
Athlete	Event	Time	Rank	Time	Rank	Time	Rank
Tomáš Franta	50 m backstroke	25.69	31	did not advance			
Tomáš Franta	100 m backstroke	54.16	20	did not advance			
Tomáš Franta	200 m backstroke	2:00.52	27	did not advance			
Jan Micka	800 m freestyle	7:48.93	10	—N/a		did not advance	
Jan Micka	1500 m freestyle	14:59.05	10	—N/a		did not advance	

Women

Athlete	Event	Heat		Semifinal		Final	
Athlete	Event	Time	Rank	Time	Rank	Time	Rank
Anika Apostalon	50 m freestyle	25.30	24	did not advance			
Anika Apostalon	100 m freestyle	54.62	19	did not advance			
Simona Kubová	50 m backstroke	28.00	7 Q	27.91	10	did not advance	
Simona Kubová	100 m backstroke	59.95	8 Q	59.79	9	did not advance	
Simona Kubová	200 m backstroke	2:11.29	19	did not advance			
Barbora Seemanová	200 m freestyle	1:57.32	7 Q	1:57.16	9	did not advance	
Barbora Seemanová	400 m freestyle	4:09.73	13	—N/a		did not advance	
Barbora Závadová	200 m butterfly	2:15.63	28	did not advance			
Barbora Závadová	200 m individual medley	2:18.34	27	did not advance			
Barbora Závadová	400 m individual medley	4:48.93	21	—N/a		did not advance	
Barbora Seemanová; Anna Kolářová; Simona Kubová; Anika Apostalon	4×100 m freestyle relay	3:40.78	11	—N/a		did not advance	
