= Czech Republic at the 2024 World Aquatics Championships =

- Flag of the Czech Republic
- FINA code: CZE
- National federation: Czech Aquatics
- Website: czechswimming.cz (in Czech)

in Doha, Qatar
- Competitors: 15 in 4 sports
- Medals: Gold 0 Silver 0 Bronze 0 Total 0

World Aquatics Championships appearances
- 1994; 1998; 2001; 2003; 2005; 2007; 2009; 2011; 2013; 2015; 2017; 2019; 2022; 2023; 2024

Other related appearances
- Czechoslovakia (1973–1991)

Czech Republic competed at the 2024 World Aquatics Championships in Doha, Qatar from 2 to 18 February.

== Competitors ==
The following is the list of competitors in the Championships.

| Sport | Men | Women | Total |
|---|---|---|---|
| Artistic swimming | 0 | 2 | 2 |
| Diving | 0 | 2 | 2 |
| Open water swimming | 2 | 2 | 4 |
| Swimming | 4 | 3 | 7 |
| Total | 6 | 9 | 15 |

== Artistic swimming ==
Women

| Athlete | Event | Preliminaries | | Final | |
| Athlete | Event | Points | Rank | Points | Rank |
|---|---|---|---|---|---|
| Karolína Klusková; Aneta Mrázková | Duet technical routine | 216.1000 | 16 | Did not advance | |
| Karolína Klusková; Aneta Mrázková | Duet free routine | 150.6167 | 25 | Did not advance | |

== Diving ==
Women

| Athlete | Event | Preliminaries | | Semifinals | | Final | |
| Athlete | Event | Points | Rank | Points | Rank | Points | Rank |
|---|---|---|---|---|---|---|---|
| Tereza Jelínková | 1 m springboard | 180.00 | 36 | — | | Did not advance | |
| Tereza Jelínková | 3 m springboard | 218.95 | 36 | Did not advance | | | |
| Ivana Medková | 1 m springboard | 148.55 | 42 | — | | Did not advance | |
| Ivana Medková | 3 m springboard | 136.20 | 51 | Did not advance | | | |
| Tereza Jelínková; Ivana Medková | 3 m synchro springboard | — | | | | 180.24 | 16 |

== Open water swimming ==
Men

| Athlete | Event | Time | Rank |
|---|---|---|---|
| Matěj Kozubek | Men's 5 km | 54:11.3 | 31 |
| Matěj Kozubek | Men's 10 km | 1:49:47.3 | 21 |
| Martin Straka | Men's 5 km | 51:56.9 | 15 |
| Martin Straka | Men's 10 km | 1:48:58.8 | 17 |

Women

| Athlete | Event | Time | Rank |
|---|---|---|---|
| Alena Benešová | Men's 5 km | 59:07.8 | 27 |
| Alena Benešová | Men's 10 km | 2:03:58.9 | 35 |
| Lenka Pavlacká | Men's 5 km | 59:14.3 | 31 |
| Lenka Pavlacká | Men's 10 km | 2:06:12.6 | 41 |

Mixed

| Athlete | Event | Time | Rank |
|---|---|---|---|
| Alena Benešová; Matěj Kozubek; Lenka Pavlacká; Martin Straka | Team relay | 1:08:07.1 | 14 |

== Swimming ==
Czech Republic entered 7 swimmers.

Men

| Athlete | Event | Heat | | Semifinal | | Final | |
| Athlete | Event | Time | Rank | Time | Rank | Time | Rank |
|---|---|---|---|---|---|---|---|
| Ondrej Gemov | 200 metre freestyle | 1:49.78 | 35 | Did not advance | | | |
| Ondrej Gemov | 200 metre butterfly | 1:57.45 | 13 Q | 1:58.34 | 15 | Did not advance | |
| Daniel Gracík | 50 metre butterfly | 23.51 | 14 Q | 23.45 NR | 13 | Did not advance | |
| Daniel Gracík | 100 metre butterfly | 52.77 | 20 | Did not advance | | | |
| Miroslav Knedla | 50 metre backstroke | 25.14 | 13 Q | 25.06 | 12 | Did not advance | |
| Miroslav Knedla | 100 metre backstroke | 54.20 | 14 Q | 53.70 | 7 Q | 53.74 | 7 |
| Miroslav Knedla | 200 metre individual medley | 2:02.44 | 21 | Did not advance | | | |
| Vojtěch Netrh | 100 metre breaststroke | 1:02.13 | 34 | Did not advance | | | |
| Vojtěch Netrh | 200 metre breaststroke | 2:13.83 | 18 | Did not advance | | | |

Women

| Athlete | Event | Heat | | Semifinal | | Final | |
| Athlete | Event | Time | Rank | Time | Rank | Time | Rank |
|---|---|---|---|---|---|---|---|
| Kristýna Horská | 100 metre breaststroke | 1:08.95 | 24 | Did not advance | | | |
| Kristýna Horská | 200 metre breaststroke | 2:26.71 | 9 Q | 2:25.34 | 8 Q | 2:25.34 | 6 |
| Barbora Janíčková | 50 metre freestyle | 25.47 | 20 | Did not advance | | | |
| Barbora Janíčková | 50 metre backstroke | 28.65 | 17 | Did not advance | | | |
| Barbora Seemanová | 100 metre freestyle | 53.97 | 4 Q | 53.76 | 6 Q | 54.64 | 8 |
| Barbora Seemanová | 200 metre freestyle | 1:58.25 | 8 Q | 1:57.00 | 4 Q | 1:56.13 | 4 |
| Barbora Seemanová | 50 metre butterfly | Did not start | | Did not advance | | | |
| Barbora Seemanová | 100 metre butterfly | 58.37 | 8 Q | 58.28 | 10 | Did not advance | |
