= Open water swimming at the 2019 World Aquatics Championships – Women's 10 km =

Women's 10 km at the 2019 World Aquatics Championships
- Venue: Yeosu Expo Ocean Park
- Location: Yeosu, South Korea
- Dates: 14 July
- Competitors: 64 from 40 nations
- Winning time: 1:54:47.2

Medalists
| gold medal | Xin Xin | China |
| silver medal | Haley Anderson | United States |
| bronze medal | Rachele Bruni | Italy |

The women's 10 km competition at the 2019 World Aquatics Championships was held on 14 July 2019.

== Race ==
The race was started at 08:00.

| Rank | Swimmer | Nationality | Time |
|---|---|---|---|
| 1st place, gold medalist(s) | Xin Xin | China | 1:54:47.2 |
| 2nd place, silver medalist(s) | Haley Anderson | United States | 1:54:48.1 |
| 3rd place, bronze medalist(s) | Rachele Bruni | Italy | 1:54:49.9 |
| 4 | Lara Grangeon | France | 1:54:50.0 |
| 5 | Ana Marcela Cunha | Brazil | 1:54:50.5 |
| 5 | Ashley Twichell | United States | 1:54:50.5 |
| 5 | Kareena Lee | Australia | 1:54:50.5 |
| 8 | Finnia Wunram | Germany | 1:54:50.7 |
| 9 | Leonie Beck | Germany | 1:54:51.0 |
| 10 | Sharon van Rouwendaal | Netherlands | 1:54:51.1 |
| 11 | Aurélie Muller | France | 1:54:51.2 |
| 12 | Viviane Jungblut | Brazil | 1:54:51.9 |
| 13 | Arianna Bridi | Italy | 1:54:52.0 |
| 14 | Dong Fuwei | China | 1:54:56.7 |
| 15 | Esmee Vermeulen | Netherlands | 1:54:58.4 |
| 16 | Anna Olasz | Hungary | 1:54:58.7 |
| 17 | Alice Dearing | Great Britain | 1:55:05.9 |
| 18 | Samantha Arévalo | Ecuador | 1:55:22.8 |
| 19 | Angélica André | Portugal | 1:55:23.4 |
| 20 | Anastasiya Krapyvina | Russia | 1:55:24.9 |
| 21 | Mariya Novikova | Russia | 1:55:26.0 |
| 22 | Yumi Kida | Japan | 1:55:26.7 |
| 22 | Réka Rohács | Hungary | 1:55:26.7 |
| 24 | Paula Ruiz | Spain | 1:55:31.2 |
| 25 | Danielle Huskisson | Great Britain | 1:55:31.5 |
| 26 | María Bramont-Arias | Peru | 1:55:33.8 |
| 27 | Špela Perše | Slovenia | 1:55:44.4 |
| 28 | Eva Fabian | Israel | 1:55:44.8 |
| 29 | Chelsea Gubecka | Australia | 1:55:45.2 |
| 30 | Minami Niikura | Japan | 1:55:46.8 |
| 31 | Michelle Weber | South Africa | 1:56:25.8 |
| 32 | Julia Arino | Argentina | 1:56:32.2 |
| 33 | María Vilas | Spain | 1:57:34.4 |
| 34 | Alena Benešová | Czech Republic | 1:57:48.6 |
| 35 | Kate Sanderson | Canada | 2:00:23.9 |
| 36 | Krystyna Panchishko | Ukraine | 2:00:28.6 |
| 37 | Kalliopi Araouzou | Greece | 2:00:30.3 |
| 38 | Eden Girloanta | Israel | 2:00:34.6 |
| 39 | Nip Tsz Yin | Hong Kong | 2:01:14.6 |
| 40 | Lenka Štěrbová | Czech Republic | 2:01:15.5 |
| 41 | Martha Sandoval | Mexico | 2:01:17.5 |
| 42 | Paola Pérez | Venezuela | 2:01:29.7 |
| 43 | Martha Aguilar | Mexico | 2:01:42.1 |
| 44 | Nataly Caldas | Ecuador | 2:02:03.5 |
| 45 | Chantel Jeffrey | Canada | 2:02:19.9 |
| 46 | Robyn Kinghorn | South Africa | 2:03:05.1 |
| 47 | Justyna Burska | Poland | 2:03:28.4 |
| 48 | Sandy Atef | Egypt | 2:07:37.8 |
| 49 | Liliana Hernández | Venezuela | 2:07:38.4 |
| 50 | Karolína Balážiková | Slovakia | 2:07:38.7 |
| 51 | Mariya Fedotova | Kazakhstan | 2:07:42.5 |
| 52 | Wong Cho Ying | Hong Kong | 2:07:43.4 |
| 53 | Lim Da-youn | South Korea | 2:07:50.9 |
| 54 | Pimpun Choopong | Thailand | 2:08:16.6 |
| 55 | Jung Ha-eun | South Korea | 2:09:36.8 |
| 56 | Yanci Vanegas | Guatemala | 2:11:59.1 |
| 57 | Fatima Flores | El Salvador | 2:12:00.6 |
| 58 | Katawan Teeka | Thailand | 2:17:27.0 |
| 59 | Hita Nayak | India | 2:17:32.3 |
| 60 | Sofie Frichot | Seychelles | 2:18:07.7 |
| 61 | Nikitha Setru | India | 2:20:09.5 |
| 62 | Camila Mercado | Bolivia | 2:23:09.7 |
| 63 | Genesis Rojas | Costa Rica | 2:23:29.4 |
| 64 | Merle Liivand | Estonia | 2:23:30.8 |
