= Czech Republic at the 2023 World Aquatics Championships =

- Flag of the Czech Republic
- World Aquatics code: CZE
- National federation: Czech Aquatics
- Website: czechswimming.cz (in Czech)

in Fukuoka, Japan
- Competitors: 10 in 3 sports
- Medals: Gold 0 Silver 0 Bronze 0 Total 0

World Aquatics Championships appearances
- 1994; 1998; 2001; 2003; 2005; 2007; 2009; 2011; 2013; 2015; 2017; 2019; 2022; 2023; 2024; 2025

Other related appearances
- Czechoslovakia (1973–1991)

Czech Republic competed at the 2023 World Aquatics Championships in Fukuoka, Japan from 14 to 30 July.

== Artistic swimming ==
Czech Republic entered 2 artistic swimmers.

Women

Athlete	Event	Preliminaries		Final	
Athlete	Event	Points	Rank	Points	Rank
Karolína Klusková	Solo technical routine	165.1000	21	did not advance	
Karolína Klusková	Solo free routine	115.0375	24	did not advance	
Karolína Klusková; Aneta Mrázková	Duet technical routine	183.8601	22	did not advance	
Karolína Klusková; Aneta Mrázková	Duet free routine	115.5354	32	did not advance	

== Open water swimming ==
Czech Republic entered 4 open water swimmers.

Men

Athlete	Event	Time	Rank
Martin Straka	Men's 5 km	56:49.5	20
Martin Straka	Men's 10 km	1:53:16.2	13
Ondřej Zach	Men's 5 km	56:52.2	22
Ondřej Zach	Men's 10 km	1:57:36.7	37

Women

Athlete	Event	Time	Rank
Alena Benešová	Women's 5 km	1:02:29.4	37
Alena Benešová	Women's 10 km	2:07:24.3	32
Lenka Štěrbová	Women's 5 km	1:01:46.7	26
Lenka Štěrbová	Women's 10 km	2:09:36.5	37

Mixed

Athlete	Event	Time	Rank
Alena Benešová; Martin Straka; Lenka Štěrbová; Ondřej Zach	Team relay	1:17:41.7	16

== Swimming ==
Czech Republic entered 5 swimmers, but Kristýna Horská has withdrawn because of injury.

Men

Athlete	Event	Heat		Semifinal		Final	
Athlete	Event	Time	Rank	Time	Rank	Time	Rank
Tomáš Franta	50 metre backstroke	25.35	24	Did not advance			
Tomáš Franta	100 metre backstroke	54.50	24	Did not advance			
Daniel Gracík	50 metre butterfly	23.96	43	Did not advance			
Daniel Gracík	100 metre butterfly	53.13	37	Did not advance			

Women

Athlete	Event	Heat		Semifinal		Final	
Athlete	Event	Time	Rank	Time	Rank	Time	Rank
Kristýna Horská	100 metre breaststroke	Did not start					
Kristýna Horská	200 metre breaststroke	Did not start					
Kristýna Horská	200 metre individual medley	Did not start					
Simona Kubová	50 metre backstroke	28.14	14 Q	28.16	15	Did not advance	
Simona Kubová	100 metre backstroke	1:00.45	14 Q	1:00.43	14	Did not advance	
Barbora Seemanová	50 metre freestyle	25.68	34	Did not advance			
Barbora Seemanová	100 metre freestyle	55.04	21	Did not advance			
Barbora Seemanová	200 metre freestyle	1:57.35	8 Q	1:56.50	9	Did not advance	
Barbora Seemanová	50 metre butterfly	27.02	32	Did not advance			
Barbora Seemanová	100 metre butterfly	59.36	22	Did not advance			
