= Germany at the 2023 World Aquatics Championships =

- Flag of Germany
- World Aquatics code: GER
- National federation: Deutscher Schwimmverband
- Website: www.dsv.de

in Fukuoka, Japan
- Competitors: 46 in 5 sports
- Medals Ranked 6th: Gold 4 Silver 0 Bronze 3 Total 7

World Aquatics Championships appearances
- 1991; 1994; 1998; 2001; 2003; 2005; 2007; 2009; 2011; 2013; 2015; 2017; 2019; 2022; 2023; 2024; 2025

Other related appearances
- East Germany (1973–1986); West Germany (1973–1986)

Germany competed at the 2023 World Aquatics Championships in Fukuoka, Japan from 14 to 30 July.

== Medalists ==
Medal	Name	Sport	Event	Date
1st place, gold medalist(s)	Leonie Beck	Open water swimming	Women's 10 km	15 July 2023
1st place, gold medalist(s)	Florian Wellbrock	Open water swimming	Men's 10 km	16 July 2023
1st place, gold medalist(s)	Leonie Beck	Open water swimming	Women's 5 km	18 July 2023
1st place, gold medalist(s)	Florian Wellbrock	Open water swimming	Men's 5 km	18 July 2023
3rd place, bronze medalist(s)	Oliver Klemet	Open water swimming	Men's 10 km	16 July 2023
3rd place, bronze medalist(s)	Timo Barthel; Lena Hentschel; Christina Wassen; Moritz Wesemann	Diving	Team event	18 July 2023
3rd place, bronze medalist(s)	Lukas Märtens	Swimming	Men's 400 metre freestyle	23 July 2023

== Athletes by discipline ==
The following is the list of number of competitors participating at the Championships per discipline.

Sport	Men	Women	Total
Artistic swimming	1	8	9
Diving	6	6	12
High diving	1	1	2
Open water swimming	3*	3	6*
Swimming	11*	8	19*
Total	20	26	46

- Oliver Klemet and Florian Wellbrock was compete in both open water swimming and indoor swimming.

== Artistic swimming ==
Women

Athlete	Event	Preliminaries		Final	
Athlete	Event	Points	Rank	Points	Rank
Klara Bleyer	Solo technical routine	200.9649	9 Q	202.4266	8
Marlene Bojer	Solo free routine	121.9084	23	Did not advance	
Klara Bleyer; Susana Rovner	Duet free routine	148.8394	18	Did not advance	

Mixed

Athlete	Event	Preliminaries		Final	
Athlete	Event	Points	Rank	Points	Rank
Frithjof Seidel; Michelle Zimmer	Duet technical routine	158.3550	15	Did not advance	
Frithjof Seidel; Michelle Zimmer	Duet free routine	124.7188	13	Did not advance	
Klara Bleyer; Marlene Bojer; Maria Denisov; Solene Guisard; Daria Martens; Susana Rovner; Frithjof Seidel; Michelle Zimmer	Team acrobatic routine	190.0267	10 Q	197.3501	9
Klara Bleyer; Marlene Bojer; Maria Denisov; Solene Guisard; Daria Martens; Susana Rovner; Daria Tonn; Michelle Zimmer	Team free routine	181.0417	15	Did not advance	

== Diving ==
Men

Athlete	Event	Preliminaries		Semifinals		Final	
Athlete	Event	Points	Rank	Points	Rank	Points	Rank
Alexander Lube	1 m springboard	309.70	30	—		Did not advance	
Moritz Wesemann	1 m springboard	364.45	7 Q	—		388.55	6
Lars Rüdiger	3 m springboard	407.35	11 Q	409.70	12 Q	408.25	8
Moritz Wesemann	3 m springboard	408.70	10 Q	448.45	5 Q	433.35	7
Luis Avila Sanchez	10 m platform	319.55	35	Did not advance			
Jaden Eikermann	10 m platform	310.70	38	Did not advance			
Timo Barthel; Lars Rüdiger	Synchronized 3 m springboard	383.04	4 Q	—		370.26	10
Timo Barthel; Jaden Eikermann	Synchronized 10 m platform	381.27	5 Q	—		364.80	9

Women

Athlete	Event	Preliminaries		Semifinals		Final	
Athlete	Event	Points	Rank	Points	Rank	Points	Rank
Lena Hentschel	1 m springboard	212.00	33	—		Did not advance	
Jette Müller	1 m springboard	242.00	8 Q	—		248.25	10
Lena Hentschel	3 m springboard	282.65	13 Q	225.30	18	Did not advance	
Jana Rother	3 m springboard	274.90	19	Did not advance			
Christina Wassen	10 m platform	290.60	14 Q	309.05	11 Q	306.75	9
Elena Wassen	10 m platform	298.60	10 Q	307.30	12 Q	293.95	10
Lena Hentschel; Jana Rother	Synchronized 3 m springboard	261.60	9 Q	—		272.67	9
Christina Wassen; Elena Wassen	Synchronized 10 m platform	273.06	7 Q	—		283.08	6

Mixed

Athlete	Event	Final	
Athlete	Event	Points	Rank
Jana Rother; Alexander Lube	Synchronized 3 m springboard	270.45	7
Pauline Pfeif; Alexander Lube	Synchronized 10 m platform	256.38	10
Timo Barthel; Lena Hentschel; Christina Wassen; Moritz Wesemann	Team event	432.15	3rd place, bronze medalist(s)

== High diving ==
Athlete	Event	Points	Rank
Manuel Halbisch	Men	246.00	18
Iris Schmidbauer	Women	215.80	13

== Open water swimming ==
Germany entered 6 open water swimmers.

Men

Athlete	Event	Time	Rank
Oliver Klemet	Men's 5 km	54:57.2	4
Oliver Klemet	Men's 10 km	1:51:00.8	3rd place, bronze medalist(s)
Florian Wellbrock	Men's 5 km	53:58.0	1st place, gold medalist(s)
Florian Wellbrock	Men's 10 km	1:50:40.3	1st place, gold medalist(s)

Women

Athlete	Event	Time	Rank
Leonie Beck	Women's 5 km	59:31.7	1st place, gold medalist(s)
Leonie Beck	Women's 10 km	2:02:34.0	1st place, gold medalist(s)
Lea Boy	Women's 10 km	2:03:12.9	7
Jeannette Spiwoks	Women's 5 km	1:00:05.1	13

Mixed

Athlete	Event	Time	Rank
Leonie Beck; Lea Boy; Rob Muffels; Oliver Klemet	Team relay	1:11:26.9	4

== Swimming ==
Men

Athlete	Event	Heat		Semifinal		Final	
Athlete	Event	Time	Rank	Time	Rank	Time	Rank
Ole Braunschweig	50 metre backstroke	24.72	5 Q	24.73	7 Q	24.93	8
Ole Braunschweig	100 metre backstroke	53.57	6 Q	54.00	15	Did not advance	
Jan Eric Friese	100 metre butterfly	53.02	36	Did not advance			
Oliver Klemet	400 metre freestyle	3:49.79	21	—		Did not advance	
Lukas Märtens	200 metre freestyle	Did not start					
Lukas Märtens	400 metre freestyle	3:44.42	5 Q	—		3:42.20	3rd place, bronze medalist(s)
Lukas Märtens	800 metre freestyle	7:42.04	3 Q	—		7:39.48 NR	5
Lukas Märtens	1500 metre freestyle	14:51.20	4 Q	—		14:44.51	5
Lucas Matzerath	50 metre breaststroke	26.94	7 Q	26.89	4 Q	26.94	6
Lucas Matzerath	100 metre breaststroke	58.74 NR	3 Q	58.75	2 Q	58.88	5
Rafael Miroslaw	100 metre freestyle	48.68	25	Did not advance			
Rafael Miroslaw	200 metre freestyle	1:46.69	13 Q	1:46.30	12	Did not advance	
Peter Varjasi	50 metre freestyle	22.54	42	Did not advance			
Florian Wellbrock	800 metre freestyle	7:45.87	9	—		Did not advance	
Florian Wellbrock	1500 metre freestyle	15:10.33	20	—		Did not advance	
Rafael Miroslaw; Josha Salchow; Luca Armbruster; Peter Varjasi	4 × 100 metre freestyle relay	3:14.04	9	—		Did not advance	
Lukas Märtens; Rafael Miroslaw; Josha Salchow; Timo Sorgius	4 × 200 metre freestyle relay	7:07.50	7 Q	—		7:06.14	7
Ole Braunschweig; Lucas Matzerath; Jan Eric Friese; Josha Salchow	4 × 100 metre medley relay	3:32.11	5 Q	—		3:32.91	8

Women

Athlete	Event	Heat		Semifinal		Final	
Athlete	Event	Time	Rank	Time	Rank	Time	Rank
Anna Elendt	50 metre breaststroke	30.33	6 Q	30.55	12	Did not advance	
Anna Elendt	100 metre breaststroke	1:07.09	19	Did not advance			
Anna Elendt	200 metre breaststroke	Did not start					
Isabel Gose	400 metre freestyle	4:03.02 NR	4 Q	—		4:05.27	7
Isabel Gose	800 metre freestyle	8:21.71	7 Q	—		8:17.95	5
Isabel Gose	1500 metre freestyle	15:59.67	5 Q	—		15:54.58	6
Angelina Köhler	50 metre butterfly	26.02	10 Q	25.88	11	Did not advance	
Angelina Köhler	100 metre butterfly	57.23	3 Q	57.05 NR	5 Q	57.05	5
Isabel Gose; Leonie Kullmann; Nele Schulze; Nina Holt	4 × 200 metre freestyle relay	8:00.48	13	—		Did not advance	
Laura Riedemann; Anna Elendt; Angelina Köhler; Nele Schulze	4 × 100 metre medley relay	4:00.71	12	—		Did not advance	

Mixed

Athlete	Event	Heat		Final	
Athlete	Event	Time	Rank	Time	Rank
Peter Varjasi; Rafael Miroslaw; Nele Schulze; Nina Holt	4 × 100 metre freestyle relay	3:26.78	8 Q	3:27.18	8
Ole Braunschweig; Lucas Matzerath; Angelina Köhler; Nele Schulze; Lisa-Marie Finger (*)	4 × 100 metre medley relay	3:45.34	8 Q	3:45.62	8

Legend: (*) = Swimmers who participated in the heat only.
