= Czech Republic at the 2013 World Aquatics Championships =

- Flag of the Czech Republic
- FINA code: CZE
- National federation: Český svaz plaveckých sportů
- Website: plavani.cstv.cz

in Barcelona, Spain
- Competitors: 20 in 4 sports
- Medals: Gold 0 Silver 0 Bronze 0 Total 0

World Aquatics Championships appearances
- 1994; 1998; 2001; 2003; 2005; 2007; 2009; 2011; 2013; 2015; 2017; 2019; 2022; 2023; 2024

Other related appearances
- Czechoslovakia (1973–1991)

Czech Republic competed at the 2013 World Aquatics Championships in Barcelona, Spain, between 19 July and 4 August 2013.

== High diving ==
Czech Republic has qualified one high diver.

| Athlete | Event | Points | Rank |
|---|---|---|---|
| Michal Navrátil | Men's high diving | 540.70 | 4 |

== Open water swimming ==
Czech Republic qualified five quota places for the following events in open water swimming.

| Athlete | Event | Time | Rank |
|---|---|---|---|
| Jan Kutník | Men's 5 km | 54:01.2 | 32 |
| Jan Kutník | Men's 10 km | 1:51:15.1 | 47 |
| Jan Pošmourný | Men's 5 km | 53:45.7 | 21 |
| Jan Pošmourný | Men's 10 km | 1:49:54.4 | 22 |
| Jan Pošmourný | Men's 25 km | 4:48:53.4 | 10 |
| Libor Smolka | Men's 25 km | 4:58:13.7 | 22 |
| Barbora Picková | Women's 5 km | 58:58.2 | 29 |
| Barbora Picková | Women's 10 km | 2:04:02.8 | 37 |
| Barbora Picková | Women's 25 km | DNF | |
| Silvie Rybářová | Women's 10 km | 1:58:55.3 | 28 |
| Silvie Rybářová | Women's 25 km | 5:22:42.4 | 14 |

== Swimming ==
Czech swimmers achieved qualifying standards in the following events (up to a maximum of 2 swimmers in each event at the A-standard entry time, and 1 at the B-standard):

Men

| Athlete | Event | Heat | | Semifinal | | Final | |
| Athlete | Event | Time | Rank | Time | Rank | Time | Rank |
|---|---|---|---|---|---|---|---|
| Martin Baďura | 50 m backstroke | 26.26 | 26 | did not advance | | | |
| Martin Baďura | 100 m backstroke | 56.19 | 30 | did not advance | | | |
| Petr Bartůněk | 50 m breaststroke | 27.84 | 27 | did not advance | | | |
| Petr Bartůněk | 100 m breaststroke | 1:05.90 | =58 | did not advance | | | |
| Tomáš Havránek | 200 m freestyle | 1:50.56 | 36 | did not advance | | | |
| Pavel Janeček | 200 m individual medley | 2:03.83 | 39 | did not advance | | | |
| Pavel Janeček | 400 m individual medley | 4:25.14 | 28 | — | | did not advance | |
| Tomáš Plevko | 50 m freestyle | 22.71 | 27 | did not advance | | | |
| Tomáš Plevko | 50 m butterfly | 24.71 | 40 | did not advance | | | |
| Jan Šefl | 200 m butterfly | 2:02.43 | 30 | did not advance | | | |
| Martin Verner | 100 m freestyle | 49.61 | =21 | did not advance | | | |
| Martin Žikmund | 100 m butterfly | 54.63 | 38 | did not advance | | | |
| Tomáš Plevko; Jan Šefl; Martin Verner; Martin Žikmund | 4×100 m freestyle relay | 3:20.12 | 13 | — | | did not advance | |
| Martin Baďura; Petr Bartůněk; Martin Verner; Martin Žikmund | 4×100 m medley relay | 3:41.49 | 18 | — | | did not advance | |

Women

| Athlete | Event | Heat | | Semifinal | | Final | |
| Athlete | Event | Time | Rank | Time | Rank | Time | Rank |
|---|---|---|---|---|---|---|---|
| Simona Baumrtová | 50 m backstroke | 28.38 NR | 11 Q | 28.20 NR | 9 | did not advance | |
| Simona Baumrtová | 100 m backstroke | 1:00.05 | 6 Q | 59.99 =NR | 7 Q | 59.84 NR | 6 |
| Simona Baumrtová | 200 m backstroke | 2:11.86 | 15 Q | 2:10.46 | 11 | did not advance | |
| Petra Chocová | 50 m breaststroke | 30.77 | 7 Q | 30.31 NR | 5 Q | DSQ | |
| Petra Chocová | 100 m breaststroke | 1:08.18 NR | 13 Q | 1:08.10 NR | 14 | did not advance | |
| Sabina Dostálová | 50 m freestyle | 26.57 | 42 | did not advance | | | |
| Sabina Dostálová | 100 m freestyle | 58.39 | 51 | did not advance | | | |
| Martina Moravčíková | 200 m breaststroke | 2:28.35 | 18 | did not advance | | | |
| Barbora Závadová | 200 m individual medley | 2:14.98 | =23 | did not advance | | | |
| Barbora Závadová | 400 m individual medley | 4:41.88 | 12 | — | | did not advance | |
| Simona Baumrtová; Petra Chocová; Sabina Dostálová; Barbora Závadová | 4×100 m medley relay | DNS | | — | | did not advance | |

== Synchronized swimming ==
Czech Republic has qualified two synchronized swimmers.

| Athlete | Event | Preliminaries | | Final | |
| Athlete | Event | Points | Rank | Points | Rank |
|---|---|---|---|---|---|
| Soňa Bernardová | Solo free routine | 84.410 | 12 Q | 83.690 | 12 |
| Soňa Bernardová | Solo technical routine | 84.900 | 11 Q | 85.200 | 11 |
| Soňa Bernardová; Alžběta Dufková | Duet free routine | 83.100 | 13 | did not advance | |
| Soňa Bernardová; Alžběta Dufková | Duet technical routine | 83.900 | 11 Q | 84.600 | 11 |
