= Italy at the 2023 World Aquatics Championships =

- Flag of Italy
- World Aquatics code: ITA
- National federation: Italian Swimming Federation
- Website: federnuoto.it (in Italian)

in Fukuoka, Japan
- Competitors: 90 in 6 sports
- Medals Ranked 8th: Gold 2 Silver 7 Bronze 5 Total 14

World Aquatics Championships appearances (overview)
- 1973; 1975; 1978; 1982; 1986; 1991; 1994; 1998; 2001; 2003; 2005; 2007; 2009; 2011; 2013; 2015; 2017; 2019; 2022; 2023; 2024; 2025

Italy competed at the 2023 World Aquatics Championships in Fukuoka, Japan from 14 to 30 July.

== Medalists ==
Medal	Name	Sport	Event	Date
Gold	Barbara Pozzobon; Ginevra Taddeucci; Domenico Acerenza; Gregorio Paltrinieri	Open water swimming	Team	July 20
Gold	Thomas Ceccon	Swimming	Men's 50 m butterfly	July 24
Silver	Linda Cerruti; Lucrezia Ruggiero	Artistic swimming	Women's duet technical routine	July 16
Silver	Gregorio Paltrinieri	Open water swimming	Men's 5 km	July 18
Silver	Linda Cerruti Marta Iacoacci Isotta Sportelli Enrica Piccoli; Sofia Mastroianni Lucrezia Ruggiero Francesca Zunino Giulia Vernice	Artistic swimming	Team technical routine	July 18
Silver	Alessandro Miressi; Manuel Frigo; Lorenzo Zazzeri; Thomas Ceccon; Leonardo Deplano	Swimming	Men's 4 × 100 m freestyle relay	July 23
Silver	Nicolò Martinenghi	Swimming	Men's 100 m breaststroke	July 24
Silver	Simona Quadarella	Swimming	Women's 1500 m freestyle	July 25
Silver	Thomas Ceccon	Swimming	Men's 100 m backstroke	July 25
Bronze	Elena Bertocchi; Chiara Pellacani	Diving	Women's synchronized 3 m springboard	July 17
Bronze	Domenico Acerenza	Open water swimming	Men's 5 km	July 18
Bronze	Matteo Santoro; Chiara Pellacani	Diving	Mixed synchronized 3 m springboard	July 22
Bronze	Italy women's national water polo team: Giuseppina Condorelli Chiara Tabani Giuditta Galardi Silvia Avegno Sofia Giustini Dafne Bettini Domitilla Picozzi; Roberta Bianconi Valeria Palmieri Claudia Marletta Agnese Cocchiere Giulia Viacava Caterina Banchelli	Water polo	Women's tournament	July 28
Bronze	Benedetta Pilato	Swimming	Women's 50 m breaststroke	July 30

== Athletes by discipline ==
The following is the list of number of competitors participating at the Championships per discipline.

Sport	Men	Women	Total
Artistic swimming	0	11	11
Diving	6	4	10
High diving	2	1	3
Open water swimming	2*	4	6*
Swimming	19*	12	31*
Water polo	15	15	30
Total	43	47	90

- Gregorio Paltrinieri was compete in both open water swimming and indoor swimming.

== Artistic swimming ==
Women

Athlete	Event	Preliminaries		Final	
Athlete	Event	Points	Rank	Points	Rank
Susanna Pedotti	Solo technical routine	193.1283	12 Q	223.7133	5
Susanna Pedotti	Solo free routine	122.6167	21	Did not advance	
Linda Cerruti; Lucrezia Ruggiero	Duet technical routine	234.2667	8 Q	263.0334	2nd place, silver medalist(s)
Linda Cerruti; Lucrezia Ruggiero	Duet free routine	213.6813	7 Q	200.0751	9

Mixed

Athlete	Event	Preliminaries		Final	
Athlete	Event	Points	Rank	Points	Rank
Linda Cerruti; Marta Iacoacci; Alessia Macchi; Sofia Mastroianni; Enrica Piccoli; Isotta Sportelli; Sophie Tabbiani; Francesca Zunino	Team acrobatic routine	197.5167	9 Q	177.3267	12
Linda Cerruti; Marta Iacoacci; Sofia Mastroianni; Enrica Piccoli; Lucrezia Ruggiero; Isotta Sportelli; Giulia Vernice; Francesca Zunino	Team technical routine	251.5379	3 Q	274.5155	2nd place, silver medalist(s)
Linda Cerruti; Marta Iacoacci; Sofia Mastroianni; Enrica Piccoli; Lucrezia Ruggiero; Isotta Sportelli; Giulia Vernice; Francesca Zunino	Team free routine	233.1010	7 Q	244.1174	6

== Diving ==
Italy entered 10 divers.

Men

Athlete	Event	Preliminaries		Semifinals		Final	
Athlete	Event	Points	Rank	Points	Rank	Points	Rank
Riccardo Giovannini	10 m platform	325.25	31	Did not advance			
Andreas Sargent Larsen	10 m platform	322.30	34	Did not advance			
Lorenzo Marsaglia	1 m springboard	340.70	18	—		Did not advance	
Lorenzo Marsaglia	3 m springboard	403.20	12 Q	430.20	8 Q	379.75	11
Giovanni Tocci	1 m springboard	354.00	14	—		Did not advance	
Giovanni Tocci	3 m springboard	434.80	5 Q	435.95	7 Q	365.95	12
Lorenzo Marsaglia; Giovanni Tocci	3 m synchro springboard	384.69	2 Q	—		380.97	6
Riccardo Giovannini; Eduard Timbretti Gugiu	10 m synchro platform	367.35	8 Q	—		368.79	8

Women

Athlete	Event	Preliminaries		Semifinals		Final	
Athlete	Event	Points	Rank	Points	Rank	Points	Rank
Elena Bertocchi	1 m springboard	239.55	9 Q	—		215.10	12
Elena Bertocchi	3 m springboard	284.85	12 Q	303.05	9 Q	269.65	12
Maia Biginelli	10 m platform	289.75	15 Q	247.30	18	Did not advance	
Sarah Jodoin Di Maria	10 m platform	326.65	4 Q	277.10	16	Did not advance	
Chiara Pellacani	1 m springboard	243.45	5 Q	—		260.85	6
Chiara Pellacani	3 m springboard	277.70	14 Q	304.95	8 Q	308.15	5
Elena Bertocchi; Chiara Pellacani	3 m synchro springboard	277.41	6 Q	—		285.99	3rd place, bronze medalist(s)

Mixed

Athlete	Event	Final	
Athlete	Event	Points	Rank
Matteo Santoro; Chiara Pellacani	3 m synchro springboard	294.12	3rd place, bronze medalist(s)
Eduard Timbretti Gugiu; Sarah Jodoin Di Maria	10 m synchro platform	278.58	6
Sarah Jodoin Di Maria; Lorenzo Marsaglia; Chiara Pellacani; Eduard Timbretti Gugiu	Team event	365.85	7

== High diving ==
Athlete	Event	Points	Rank
Davide Baraldi	Men's high diving	321.35	13
Andrea Barnaba	Men's high diving	308.25	15
Elisa Cosetti	Women's high diving	258.50	9

== Open water swimming ==
Italy entered 6 open water swimmers.

Men

Athlete	Event	Time	Rank
Domenico Acerenza	Men's 5 km	54:04.2	3rd place, bronze medalist(s)
Domenico Acerenza	Men's 10 km	1:51:16.7	4
Gregorio Paltrinieri	Men's 5 km	54:02.5	2nd place, silver medalist(s)
Gregorio Paltrinieri	Men's 10 km	1:51:40.7	5

Women

Athlete	Event	Time	Rank
Rachele Bruni	Women's 5 km	1:01:24.2	21
Giulia Gabbrielleschi	Women's 10 km	2:03:15.7	10
Barbara Pozzobon	Women's 5 km	59:35.8	5
Ginevra Taddeucci	Women's 10 km	2:02:46.7	6

Mixed

Athlete	Event	Time	Rank
Barbara Pozzobon; Ginevra Taddeucci; Domenico Acerenza; Gregorio Paltrinieri	Team relay	1:10:31.2	1st place, gold medalist(s)

== Swimming ==
Italy entered 32 swimmers.

Men

Athlete	Event	Heat		Semifinal		Final	
Athlete	Event	Time	Rank	Time	Rank	Time	Rank
Federico Burdisso	100 metre butterfly	51.98	20	Did not advance			
Federico Burdisso	200 metre butterfly	1:56.86	18	Did not advance			
Thomas Ceccon	50 metre backstroke	24.80	8 Q	24.57	5 Q	24.58	5
Thomas Ceccon	100 metre backstroke	53.84	14 Q	52.16	1 Q	52.27	2nd place, silver medalist(s)
Thomas Ceccon	50 metre butterfly	23.14	6 Q	22.92	3 Q	22.68 NR	1st place, gold medalist(s)
Simone Cerasuolo	50 metre breaststroke	27.06	8 Q	27.07	9	Did not advance	
Matteo Ciampi	400 metre freestyle	3:48.12	14	—		Did not advance	
Piero Codia	50 metre butterfly	24.13	47	Did not advance			
Piero Codia	100 metre butterfly	52.01	21	Did not advance			
Luca De Tullio	800 metre freestyle	7:46.87	11	—		Did not advance	
Luca De Tullio	1500 metre freestyle	14:57.68	13	—		Did not advance	
Marco De Tullio	200 metre freestyle	1:46.69	13 Q	1:46.05	10	Did not advance	
Marco De Tullio	400 metre freestyle	3:47.23	12	—		Did not advance	
Leonardo Deplano	50 metre freestyle	21.99	14 Q	21.74	6	21.92	8
Stefano Di Cola	200 metre freestyle	1:47.27	24	Did not advance			
Manuel Frigo	100 metre freestyle	48.45	20	Did not advance			
Nicolò Martinenghi	50 metre breaststroke	26.64	2 Q	26.74	2 Q	26.84	5
Nicolò Martinenghi	100 metre breaststroke	59.04	4 Q	59.21	7 Q	58.72	2nd place, silver medalist(s)
Alessandro Miressi	100 metre freestyle	48.14	9 Q	48.21	13	Did not advance	
Lorenzo Mora	200 metre backstroke	1:59.99	23	Did not advance			
Gregorio Paltrinieri	800 metre freestyle	7:44.89	7 Q	—		7:53.68	8
Federico Poggio	100 metre breaststroke	59.43	7 Q	59.51	9	Did not advance	
Alberto Razzetti	200 metre butterfly	1:55.35	5 Q	1:55.00	9	Did not advance	
Alberto Razzetti	200 metre individual medley	1:58.74	13 Q	1:57.39	9	Did not advance	
Alberto Razzetti	400 metre individual medley	4:11.57	4 Q	—		4:11.73	7
Matteo Restivo	200 metre backstroke	1:58.57	17	Did not advance			
Lorenzo Zazzeri	50 metre freestyle	22.28	30	Did not advance			
Alessandro Miressi; Manuel Frigo; Lorenzo Zazzeri; Thomas Ceccon; Leonardo Deplano	4 × 100 m freestyle relay	3:12.53	3 Q	—		3:10.49	2nd place, silver medalist(s)
Marco De Tullio; Filippo Megli; Matteo Ciampi; Stefano Di Cola	4 × 200 m freestyle relay	7:06.12	3 Q	—		7:03.86	5
Thomas Ceccon; Nicolò Martinenghi; Piero Codia; Manuel Frigo	4 × 100 m medley relay	3:33.54	9	—		Did not advance	

Women

Athlete	Event	Heat		Semifinal		Final	
Athlete	Event	Time	Rank	Time	Rank	Time	Rank
Lisa Angiolini	100 metre breaststroke	1:06.28	6 Q	1:07.03	14	Did not advance	
Lisa Angiolini	200 metre breaststroke	Did not start					
Ilaria Bianchi	100 metre butterfly	58.62	18	Did not advance			
Anita Bottazzo	50 metre breaststroke	30.02	2 Q	30.29	7	30.11	5
Martina Carraro	100 metre breaststroke	1:06.63	11 Q	1:06.56	11	Did not advance	
Martina Carraro	200 metre breaststroke	2:26.10	13 Q	2:25.76	14	Did not advance	
Costanza Cocconcelli	50 metre backstroke	28.51	23	Did not advance			
Sara Franceschi	200 metre individual medley	2:10.68	8 Q	Disqualified		Did not advance	
Sara Franceschi	400 metre individual medley	4:38.89	6 Q	—		4:37.73	6
Sofia Morini	100 metre freestyle	54.50	13 Q	54.72	14	Did not advance	
Margherita Panziera	50 metre backstroke	28.61	25	Did not advance			
Margherita Panziera	100 metre backstroke	1:00.40	13 Q	1:01.31	16	Did not advance	
Margherita Panziera	200 metre backstroke	2:10.90	11 Q	2:10.65	10	Did not advance	
Simona Quadarella	800 metre freestyle	8:21.65	6 Q	—		8:16.46	4
Simona Quadarella	1500 metre freestyle	15:55.05	2 Q	—		15:43.31	2nd place, silver medalist(s)
Benedetta Pilato	50 metre breaststroke	29.60	1 Q	30.09	4	30.04	3rd place, bronze medalist(s)
Chiara Tarantino	50 metre freestyle	25.11	18	Did not advance			
Chiara Tarantino; Costanza Cocconcelli; Emma Menicucci; Sofia Morini	4 × 100 m freestyle relay	3:37.93	9	—		Did not advance	
Sofia Morini; Costanza Cocconcelli; Sara Franceschi; Emma Menicucci	4 × 200 m freestyle relay	8:00.13	12	—		Did not advance	
Margherita Panziera; Martina Carraro; Ilaria Bianchi; Sofia Morini	4 × 100 m medley relay	4:00.67	11	—		Did not advance	

Mixed

Athlete	Event	Heat		Final	
Athlete	Event	Time	Rank	Time	Rank
Alessandro Miressi; Thomas Ceccon; Costanza Cocconcelli; Sofia Morini; Manuel Frigo	4 × 100 m freestyle relay	3:24.39	3 Q	3:24.53	5
Lorenzo Mora; Federico Poggio; Ilaria Bianchi; Costanza Cocconcelli	4 × 100 m medley relay	3:46.08	11	Did not advance	

== Water polo ==
Summary

Team	Event	Group stage				Playoff	Quarterfinal	Semifinal	Final / BM	
Team	Event	Opposition Score	Opposition Score	Opposition Score	Rank	Opposition Score	Opposition Score	Opposition Score	Opposition Score	Rank
Italy	Men's tournament	France; W 13–6	Canada; W 24–6	China; W 18–5	1 Q	—	Serbia; L 14–15	Montenegro; W 10–6	France; W 16–9	5
Italy	Women's tournament	Argentina; W 27–1	South Africa; W 24–2	Greece; L 12–16	2 QP	New Zealand; W 14–7	United States; W 8–7	Netherlands; L 8–9	Australia; W 16–14	3rd place, bronze medalist(s)

=== Men's tournament ===
Team roster

The following is the Italian roster.

Head coach: Sandro Campagna

- 1 Marco Del Lungo GK
- 2 Francesco Di Fulvio FP
- 3 Luca Damonte FP
- 4 Luca Marziali FP
- 5 Andrea Fondelli FP
- 6 Giacomo Cannella FP
- 7 Vincenzo Renzuto FP
- 8 Gonzalo Echenique FP
- 9 Nicholas Presciutti FP
- 10 Lorenzo Bruni FP
- 11 Edoardo Di Somma FP
- 12 Vincenzo Dolce FP
- 13 Gianmarco Nicosia GK
- Alessandro Velotto FP
- Francesco Condemi FP

Group play

Pos	Team	Pld	W	PSW	PSL	L	GF	GA	GD	Pts	Qualification
1	Italy	3	3	0	0	0	55	17	+38	9	Quarterfinals
2	France	3	2	0	0	1	38	32	+6	6	Playoffs
3	Canada	3	1	0	0	2	30	49	−19	3	Playoffs
4	China	3	0	0	0	3	23	48	−25	0	

Source: Sportresult
Rules for classification: 1) points; 2) head-to-head points; 3) head-to-head goal difference; 4) head-to-head number of goals scored; 5) Goal difference.

17 July 2023; 13:30	Report	France	6–13	Italy	Marine Messe Fukuoka, Fukuoka; Referees: Vojin Putniković (SRB), Michiel Zwartt (NED)
17 July 2023; 13:30	Report	Score by quarters: 3–2, 2–3, 0–3, 1–5			Marine Messe Fukuoka, Fukuoka; Referees: Vojin Putniković (SRB), Michiel Zwartt (NED)
17 July 2023; 13:30	Report	Crousillat, Khasz 2	Goals	Fondelli 4	Marine Messe Fukuoka, Fukuoka; Referees: Vojin Putniković (SRB), Michiel Zwartt (NED)

19 July 2023; 09:00	Report	Italy	24–6	Canada	Marine Messe Fukuoka, Fukuoka; Referees: Tamás Kovács-Csatlós (HUN), David Gómez (ESP)
19 July 2023; 09:00	Report	Score by quarters: 6–0, 4–2, 8–4, 6–0			Marine Messe Fukuoka, Fukuoka; Referees: Tamás Kovács-Csatlós (HUN), David Gómez (ESP)
19 July 2023; 09:00	Report	three players 4	Goals	Constantin-Bicari 3	Marine Messe Fukuoka, Fukuoka; Referees: Tamás Kovács-Csatlós (HUN), David Gómez (ESP)

21 July 2023; 17:30	Report	China	5–18	Italy	Marine Messe Fukuoka, Fukuoka; Referees: Veselin Mišković (MNE), Germán Moller (ARG)
21 July 2023; 17:30	Report	Score by quarters: 2–2, 1–7, 2–6, 0–3			Marine Messe Fukuoka, Fukuoka; Referees: Veselin Mišković (MNE), Germán Moller (ARG)
21 July 2023; 17:30	Report	Chen Z. 2	Goals	Condemi, Di Fulvio 4	Marine Messe Fukuoka, Fukuoka; Referees: Veselin Mišković (MNE), Germán Moller (ARG)

Quarterfinals

25 July 2023; 16:30	Report	Italy	14–15 (PSO)	Serbia	Marine Messe Fukuoka, Fukuoka; Referees: Michiel Zwartt (NED), Frank Ohme (GER)
25 July 2023; 16:30	Report	Score by quarters: 3–3, 2–2, 4–4, 2–2 PSO: 3–4			Marine Messe Fukuoka, Fukuoka; Referees: Michiel Zwartt (NED), Frank Ohme (GER)
25 July 2023; 16:30	Report	Di Fulvio 3	Goals	Rašović 4	Marine Messe Fukuoka, Fukuoka; Referees: Michiel Zwartt (NED), Frank Ohme (GER)

5–8th place semifinals

27 July 2023; 14:00	Report	Montenegro	6–10	Italy	Marine Messe Fukuoka, Fukuoka; Referees: Adrian-Tiberiu Alexandrescu (ROU), Tamás Kovács-Csatlós (HUN)
27 July 2023; 14:00	Report	Score by quarters: 1–1, 1–3, 2–3, 2–3			Marine Messe Fukuoka, Fukuoka; Referees: Adrian-Tiberiu Alexandrescu (ROU), Tamás Kovács-Csatlós (HUN)
27 July 2023; 14:00	Report	Perković 3	Goals	Damonte 3	Marine Messe Fukuoka, Fukuoka; Referees: Adrian-Tiberiu Alexandrescu (ROU), Tamás Kovács-Csatlós (HUN)

Fifth place game

29 July 2023; 16:30	Report	Italy	16–9	France	Marine Messe Fukuoka, Fukuoka; Referees: Tamás Kovács-Csatlós (HUN), Veselin Mišković (MNE)
29 July 2023; 16:30	Report	Score by quarters: 1–2, 3–2, 7–3, 5–2			Marine Messe Fukuoka, Fukuoka; Referees: Tamás Kovács-Csatlós (HUN), Veselin Mišković (MNE)
29 July 2023; 16:30	Report	Di Fulvio 5	Goals	Crousillat 3	Marine Messe Fukuoka, Fukuoka; Referees: Tamás Kovács-Csatlós (HUN), Veselin Mišković (MNE)

=== Women's tournament ===
Team roster

The following is the Italian roster.

Head coach: Carlo Silipo

- 1 Giuseppina Condorelli GK
- 2 Chiara Tabani FP
- 3 Giuditta Galardi FP
- 4 Silvia Avegno FP
- 5 Sofia Giustini FP
- 6 Dafne Bettini FP
- 7 Domitilla Picozzi FP
- 8 Roberta Bianconi FP
- 9 Valeria Palmieri FP
- 10 Claudia Marletta FP
- 11 Agnese Cocchiere FP
- 12 Giulia Viacava FP
- 13 Caterina Banchelli GK
- Lucrezia Cergol FP
- Veronica Gant FP

Group play

Pos	Team	Pld	W	PSW	PSL	L	GF	GA	GD	Pts	Qualification
1	Greece	3	3	0	0	0	61	16	+45	9	Quarterfinals
2	Italy	3	2	0	0	1	63	19	+44	6	Playoffs
3	South Africa	3	1	0	0	2	16	57	−41	3	Playoffs
4	Argentina	3	0	0	0	3	12	60	−48	0	

Source: Sportresult
Rules for classification: 1) points; 2) head-to-head points; 3) head-to-head goal difference; 4) head-to-head number of goals scored; 5) Goal difference.

16 July 2023; 16:00	Report	Italy	27–1	Argentina	Marine Messe Fukuoka, Fukuoka; Referees: Adil Aimbetov (KAZ), Sébastien Dervieux (FRA)
16 July 2023; 16:00	Report	Score by quarters: 3–1, 7–0, 6–0, 11–0			Marine Messe Fukuoka, Fukuoka; Referees: Adil Aimbetov (KAZ), Sébastien Dervieux (FRA)
16 July 2023; 16:00	Report	Avegno 4	Goals	Leonard 1	Marine Messe Fukuoka, Fukuoka; Referees: Adil Aimbetov (KAZ), Sébastien Dervieux (FRA)

18 July 2023; 12:00	Report	South Africa	2–24	Italy	Marine Messe Fukuoka, Fukuoka; Referees: Jennifer McCall (USA), Chisato Kurosaki (JPN)
18 July 2023; 12:00	Report	Score by quarters: 1–2, 0–7, 1–7, 0–8			Marine Messe Fukuoka, Fukuoka; Referees: Jennifer McCall (USA), Chisato Kurosaki (JPN)
18 July 2023; 12:00	Report	MacDonell, Meecham 1	Goals	Bettini, Giustini 4	Marine Messe Fukuoka, Fukuoka; Referees: Jennifer McCall (USA), Chisato Kurosaki (JPN)

20 July 2023; 10:30	Report	Greece	16–12	Italy	Marine Messe Fukuoka, Fukuoka; Referees: Nenad Peris (CRO), Matan Schwartz (ISR)
20 July 2023; 10:30	Report	Score by quarters: 6–4, 4–1, 3–2, 3–5			Marine Messe Fukuoka, Fukuoka; Referees: Nenad Peris (CRO), Matan Schwartz (ISR)
20 July 2023; 10:30	Report	four players 3	Goals	four players 2	Marine Messe Fukuoka, Fukuoka; Referees: Nenad Peris (CRO), Matan Schwartz (ISR)

Playoffs

22 July 2023; 17:00	Report	Italy	14–7	New Zealand	Marine Messe Fukuoka, Fukuoka; Referees: Germán Moller (ARG), Chisato Kurosaki (JPN)
22 July 2023; 17:00	Report	Score by quarters: 4–1, 6–2, 1–3, 3–1			Marine Messe Fukuoka, Fukuoka; Referees: Germán Moller (ARG), Chisato Kurosaki (JPN)
22 July 2023; 17:00	Report	Bettini 3	Goals	Doyle 2	Marine Messe Fukuoka, Fukuoka; Referees: Germán Moller (ARG), Chisato Kurosaki (JPN)

Quarterfinals

24 July 2023; 15:00	Report	United States	7–8	Italy	Marine Messe Fukuoka, Fukuoka; Referees: Matan Schwartz (ISR), Zhang Liang (CHN)
24 July 2023; 15:00	Report	Score by quarters: 2–3, 2–1, 2–2, 1–2			Marine Messe Fukuoka, Fukuoka; Referees: Matan Schwartz (ISR), Zhang Liang (CHN)
24 July 2023; 15:00	Report	Steffens 4	Goals	Giustini 3	Marine Messe Fukuoka, Fukuoka; Referees: Matan Schwartz (ISR), Zhang Liang (CHN)

Semifinals

26 July 2023; 17:00	Report	Italy	8–9	Netherlands	Marine Messe Fukuoka, Fukuoka; Referees: Sébastien Dervieux (FRA), Nóra Debreceni (HUN)
26 July 2023; 17:00	Report	Score by quarters: 2–4, 3–2, 2–2, 1–1			Marine Messe Fukuoka, Fukuoka; Referees: Sébastien Dervieux (FRA), Nóra Debreceni (HUN)
26 July 2023; 17:00	Report	Marletta 3	Goals	L. Rogge, Wolves 2	Marine Messe Fukuoka, Fukuoka; Referees: Sébastien Dervieux (FRA), Nóra Debreceni (HUN)

Third place game

28 July 2023; 13:00	Report	Italy	16–14	Australia	Marine Messe Fukuoka, Fukuoka; Referees: Darren Spiritosanto (USA), Matan Schwartz (ISR)
28 July 2023; 13:00	Report	Score by quarters: 5–4, 5–6, 3–1, 3–3			Marine Messe Fukuoka, Fukuoka; Referees: Darren Spiritosanto (USA), Matan Schwartz (ISR)
28 July 2023; 13:00	Report	Bianconi 6	Goals	Williams 3	Marine Messe Fukuoka, Fukuoka; Referees: Darren Spiritosanto (USA), Matan Schwartz (ISR)
