= Karolína Balážiková =

Slovak swimmer (born 2001)

Personal information
- Born: 26 April 2001 (age 25)

Sport
- Sport: Swimming

Karolína Balážiková (born 26 April 2001) is a Slovak swimmer. She represented Slovakia at the 2017 World Aquatics Championships in Budapest, Hungary and at the 2019 World Aquatics Championships in Gwangju, South Korea.

In 2018, she finished in 18th place in the women's 5 km at the 2018 European Aquatics Championships.

In 2019, she competed in all three women's long-distance swimming competitions at the 2019 World Aquatics Championships: in the 5 km event she finished in 40th place, in the 10 km event she finished in 50th place and in the 25 km event she did not finish her race.
