= Diving at the 2023 World Aquatics Championships – Mixed synchronized 10 metre platform =

Mixed synchronized 10 metre platform at the 2023 World Aquatics Championships
- Venue: Fukuoka Prefectural Pool
- Location: Fukuoka, Japan
- Dates: 15 July
- Competitors: 28 from 14 nations
- Teams: 14
- Winning points: 339.54

Medalists
gold medal	Wang Feilong; Zhang Jiaqi	China
silver medal	Diego Balleza; Viviana del Ángel	Mexico
bronze medal	Hiroki Ito; Minami Itahashi	Japan

The mixed synchronized 10 metre platform competition at the 2023 World Aquatics Championships was held on 15 July 2023.

== Results ==
The final was started at 12:30.

Rank	Nation	Divers	Points
1st place, gold medalist(s)	China	Wang Feilong; Zhang Jiaqi	339.54
2nd place, silver medalist(s)	Mexico	Diego Balleza; Viviana del Ángel	313.44
3rd place, bronze medalist(s)	Japan	Hiroki Ito; Minami Itahashi	305.34
4	Ukraine	Kirill Boliukh; Kseniya Baylo	295.44
5	Canada	Nathan Zsombor-Murray; Kate Miller	290.43
6	Italy	Eduard Timbretti Gugiu; Sarah Jodoin Di Maria	278.58
7	Puerto Rico	Emanuel Vázquez; Maycey Vieta	276.84
8	Cuba	Carlos Ramos; Anisley García	262.05
9	South Korea	Kim Yeong-taek; Moon Na-yun	256.50
10	Germany	Alexander Lube; Pauline Pfeif	256.38
11	United States	Max Weinrich; Kaylee Bishop	256.02
12	Malaysia	Jellson Jabillin; Nur Eilisha Rania Muhammad Abrar Raj	251.64
13	Spain	Carlos Camacho; Valeria Antolino	249.72
14	Macau	Zhang Hoi; Lo Ka Wai	186.15
