= Chantel Jeffrey =

Canadian swimmer (born 2001)

Personal information
- Full name: Chantel Lily Jeffrey
- Born: 18 July 2001 (age 24) Salmon Arm, British Columbia, Canada
- Height: 164.6 cm (5 ft 5 in)

Sport
- Sport: Swimming
- Coach: Brad Dingey

Chantel Lily Jeffrey (born 18 July 2001) is a Canadian swimmer. In 2019, she competed in the women's 5 km and women's 10 km events at the 2019 World Aquatics Championships held in Gwangju, South Korea. In the 5 km event she finished in 28th place and in the 10 km event she finished in 45th place. In 2019, she also competed in the women's marathon 10 kilometres at the 2019 Pan American Games held in Lima, Peru and she finished in 9th place.
