= Open water swimming at the 2018 European Aquatics Championships – Women's 5 km =

Women's 5 km at the 2018 European Aquatics Championships
- Venue: Loch Lomond
- Dates: 8 August
- Competitors: 18 from 11 nations
- Winning time: 56:01.0

Medalists
gold medal	Sharon van Rouwendaal	Netherlands
silver medal	Leonie Beck	Germany
bronze medal	Rachele Bruni	Italy

The Women's 5 km competition of the 2018 European Aquatics Championships was held on 8 August 2018.

== Results ==
The race was started at 09:30.

Rank	Swimmer	Nationality	Time
1st place, gold medalist(s)	Sharon van Rouwendaal	Netherlands	56:01.0
2nd place, silver medalist(s)	Leonie Beck	Germany	56:17.8
3rd place, bronze medalist(s)	Rachele Bruni	Italy	56:49.7
4	Arianna Bridi	Italy	56:58.8
5	Kalliopi Araouzou	Greece	57:17.3
6	Alena Benešová	Czech Republic	57:21.1
7	Martina De Memme	Italy	57:24.4
8	Lara Grangeon	France	57:25.6
9	Mariia Novikova	Russia	57:25.8
10	Oceane Cassignol	France	57:25.9
11	Adeline Furst	France	58:03.7
12	Lea Boy	Germany	58:04.0
13	Polly Holden	Great Britain	58:20.9
14	Krystyna Panchishko	Ukraine	58:22.9
15	Špela Perše	Slovenia	58:24.4
16	Jeannette Spiwoks	Germany	58:24.5
17	Daria Kulik	Russia	59:14.6
18	Karolína Balážiková	Slovakia	1:02:52.4
