= Justyna Burska =

Polish swimmer (1995–2024)

Personal information
- Born: 7 April 1995 Łódź, Poland
- Died: 17 August 2024 (aged 29)

Sport
- Sport: Swimming

Justyna Burska (7 April 1995 – 17 August 2024) was a Polish swimmer. In 2019, she competed in the women's 5 km and women's 10 km events at the 2019 World Aquatics Championships held in Gwangju, South Korea. In the 5 km event she finished in 34th place and in the 10 km event she finished in 47th place. Burksa was born on 7 April 1995, and died in a traffic collision on 17 August 2024, at the age of 29.
