= Spain at the 2023 World Aquatics Championships =

- Flag of Spain
- World Aquatics code: ESP
- National federation: Royal Spanish Swimming Federation
- Website: rfen.es (in Spanish)

in Fukuoka, Japan
- Competitors: 75 in 6 sports
- Medals Ranked 7th: Gold 3 Silver 2 Bronze 4 Total 9

World Aquatics Championships appearances
- 1973; 1975; 1978; 1982; 1986; 1991; 1994; 1998; 2001; 2003; 2005; 2007; 2009; 2011; 2013; 2015; 2017; 2019; 2022; 2023; 2024; 2025

Spain competed at the 2023 World Aquatics Championships in Fukuoka, Japan from 14 to 30 July.

== Medalists ==
Medal	Name	Sport	Event	Date
Gold	Fernando Díaz del Río	Artistic swimming	Men's solo technical routine	July 17
Gold	Cristina Arambula Paula Ramírez Blanca Toledano Iris Tió; Meritxell Mas Sara Saldaña Alisa Ozhogina Marina García Polo	Artistic swimming	Team technical routine	July 18
Gold	Dennis González	Artistic swimming	Men's solo free routine	July 19
Silver	Dennis González; Emma García	Artistic swimming	Mixed duet technical routine	July 16
Silver	Spain women's national water polo team: Laura Ester Cristina Nogué Anni Espar Beatriz Ortiz Nona Pérez Paula Crespí Elena Ruiz; Pili Peña Judith Forca Paula Camus Maica García Godoy Paula Leitón Martina Terré	Water polo	Women's tournament	July 28
Bronze	Iris Tió	Artistic swimming	Women's solo technical routine	July 15
Bronze	Alisa Ozhogina; Iris Tió	Artistic swimming	Women's duet technical routine	July 16
Bronze	Dennis González; Mireia Hernández	Artistic swimming	Mixed duet free routine	July 22
Bronze	Spain men's national water polo team: Unai Aguirre Alberto Munárriz Álvaro Granados Bernat Sanahuja Miguel del Toro Marc Larumbe Martin Famera; Sergi Cabanas Roger Tahull Felipe Perrone Blai Mallarach Alejandro Bustos Eduardo Lorrio	Water polo	Men's tournament	July 29

Medals by sport
Sport	1st place, gold medalist(s)	2nd place, silver medalist(s)	3rd place, bronze medalist(s)	Total
Artistic swimming	3	1	3	7
Water polo	0	1	1	2

== Athletes by discipline ==
The following is the list of number of competitors participating at the Championships per discipline.

Sport	Men	Women	Total
Artistic swimming	2	11	13
Diving	4	3	7
High diving	1	1	2
Open water swimming	2*	3*	5*
Swimming	10*	12*	22*
Water polo	15	14	29
Total	33	42	75

- Carlos Garach, Ángela Martínez and Paula Otero was compete in both open water swimming and indoor swimming.

== Artistic swimming ==
Men

Athlete	Event	Preliminaries		Final	
Athlete	Event	Points	Rank	Points	Rank
Fernando Díaz del Río	Solo technical routine	220.4034	1 Q	224.5550	1st place, gold medalist(s)
Dennis González	Solo free routine	169.8521	4 Q	193.0334	1st place, gold medalist(s)

Women

Athlete	Event	Preliminaries		Final	
Athlete	Event	Points	Rank	Points	Rank
Iris Tió	Solo technical routine	204.6666	7 Q	254.2100	3rd place, bronze medalist(s)
Iris Tió	Solo free routine	174.0208	7 Q	178.9146	8
Alisa Ozhogina; Iris Tió	Duet technical routine	228.7059	9 Q	257.8368	3rd place, bronze medalist(s)
Alisa Ozhogina; Iris Tió	Duet free routine	223.1792	5 Q	175.7437	11

Mixed

Athlete	Event	Preliminaries		Final	
Athlete	Event	Points	Rank	Points	Rank
Emma García; Dennis González	Duet technical routine	244.1433	1 Q	248.0499	2nd place, silver medalist(s)
Dennis González; Mireia Hernández	Duet free routine	198.9042	2 Q	183.4207	3rd place, bronze medalist(s)
Cristina Arambula; Marina García Polo; Meritxell Mas; Alisa Ozhogina; Paula Ramírez; Sara Saldaña; Iris Tió; Blanca Toledano	Team technical routine	246.7484	6 Q	281.6893	1st place, gold medalist(s)
Cristina Arambula; Berta Ferreras; Marina García Polo; Meritxell Mas; Alisa Ozhogina; Paula Ramírez; Sara Saldaña; Iris Tió	Team free routine	294.9313	2 Q	249.6521	4

== Diving ==
Spain entered 7 divers.

Men

Athlete	Event	Preliminaries		Semifinals		Final	
Athlete	Event	Points	Rank	Points	Rank	Points	Rank
Adrián Abadía	1 m springboard	311.15	29	—N/a		Did not advance	
Alberto Arévalo	1 m springboard	279.00	44	—N/a		Did not advance	
Alberto Arévalo	3 m springboard	294.25	51	Did not advance			
Carlos Camacho	10 m platform	389.75	14 Q	399.10	13	Did not advance	
Nicolás García	3 m springboard	359.05	31	Did not advance			
Adrián Abadía; Nicolás García	3 m synchro springboard	370.62	6 Q	—N/a		383.61	5

Women

Athlete	Event	Preliminaries		Semifinals		Final	
Athlete	Event	Points	Rank	Points	Rank	Points	Rank
Valeria Antolino	10 m platform	292.30	13 Q	292.50	14	Did not advance	
Ana Carvajal	10 m platform	300.55	9 Q	313.50	10 Q	311.70	8
Rocío Velázquez	1 m springboard	189.40	40	—N/a		Did not advance	
Rocío Velázquez	3 m springboard	230.65	35	Did not advance			
Valeria Antolino; Ana Carvajal	10 m synchro platform	259.83	9 Q	—N/a		280.38	7

Mixed

Athlete	Event	Final	
Athlete	Event	Points	Rank
Carlos Camacho; Rocío Velázquez	3 m synchro springboard	245.88	12
Carlos Camacho; Valeria Antolino	10 m synchro platform	249.72	13
Rocío Velázquez; Alberto Arévalo; Carlos Camacho; Valeria Antolino	Team event	400.00	6

== High diving ==
Athlete	Event	Points	Rank
Carlos Gimeno	Men's high diving	396.00	6
Carlota González	Women's high diving	203.00	17

== Open water swimming ==
Spain entered 5 open water swimmers.

Men

Athlete	Event	Time	Rank
Carlos Garach	Men's 5 km	56:14.7	12
Guillem Pujol	Men's 5 km	57:48.4	33
Guillem Pujol	Men's 10 km	1:54:03.1	19

Women

Athlete	Event	Time	Rank
Ángela Martínez	Women's 5 km	59:50.3	12
Ángela Martínez	Women's 10 km	2:03:16.5	11
Candela Sánchez	Women's 5 km	1:01:25.3	22
Candela Sánchez	Women's 10 km	2:03:18.2	14

Mixed

Athlete	Event	Time	Rank
Carlos Garach; Ángela Martínez; Paula Otero; Guillem Pujol	Team relay	1:13:41.8	8

== Swimming ==
Spain entered 22 swimmers.

Men

Athlete	Event	Heat		Semifinal		Final	
Athlete	Event	Time	Rank	Time	Rank	Time	Rank
Carles Coll	200 metre breaststroke	2:13.09	28	Did not advance			
Carles Coll	200 metre individual medley	2:01.22	23	Did not advance			
Sergio de Celis	50 metre freestyle	22.51	39	Did not advance			
Luis Domínguez	100 metre freestyle	49.11	35	Did not advance			
Luis Domínguez	200 metre freestyle	1:49.28	34	Did not advance			
Carlos Garach	800 metre freestyle	7:59.52	25	—N/a		Did not advance	
Carlos Garach	1500 metre freestyle	15:08.02	19	—N/a		Did not advance	
Arbidel González	200 metre butterfly	1:54.99 NR	2 Q	1:55.61	12	Did not advance	
Hugo González	50 metre backstroke	25.42	26	Did not advance			
Hugo González	100 metre backstroke	53.70	9 Q	53.38	11	Did not advance	
Hugo González	200 metre backstroke	1:57.99	10 Q	1:57.28	8 Q	1:56.33	7
Hugo González	200 metre individual medley	1:58.47	10 Q	1:56.58	4 Q	1:57.37	7
Mario Mollà	50 metre butterfly	23.34	14	23.16	10	Did not advance	
Mario Mollà	100 metre butterfly	52.05	22	Did not advance			
Carlos Quijada	400 metre freestyle	3:49.60	20	—N/a		Did not advance	
Adrian Santos	50 metre backstroke	25.15	18	Did not advance			
Sergio de Celis; Luis Domínguez; Mario Mollà; César Castro	4 × 100 m freestyle relay	3:13.77	6 Q	—N/a		3:14.64	8
Cesar Castro; Luis Dominguez; Sergio de Celis; Carlos Quijada	4 × 200 m freestyle relay	7:10.85 NR	13	—N/a		Did not advance	
Hugo González; Carles Coll; Mario Mollà; César Castro	4 × 100 m medley relay	3:35.13	14	—N/a		Did not advance	

Women

Athlete	Event	Heat		Semifinal		Final	
Athlete	Event	Time	Rank	Time	Rank	Time	Rank
Ainhoa Campabadal	200 metre freestyle	2:02.78	43	Did not advance			
Emma Carrasco	200 metre individual medley	2:15.11	22	Did not advance			
Emma Carrasco	400 metre individual medley	4:50.83	28	—N/a		Did not advance	
Paula Juste	100 metre butterfly	59.94	27	Did not advance			
Ángela Martínez	800 metre freestyle	8:39.60	23	—N/a		Did not advance	
Ángela Martínez	1500 metre freestyle	16:24.38	15	—N/a		Did not advance	
Jimena Pérez	800 metre freestyle	8:37.40	21	—N/a		Did not advance	
Paula Otero	400 metre freestyle	4:14.63	28	—N/a		Did not advance	
Paula Otero	1500 metre freestyle	16:38.73	23	—N/a		Did not advance	
Jessica Vall	100 metre breaststroke	1:08.64	28	Did not advance			
Jessica Vall	200 metre breaststroke	2:26.88	18	Did not advance			
Alba Vázquez	400 metre individual medley	4:42.11	15	—N/a		Did not advance	
Carmen Weiler	100 metre freestyle	55.46	25	Did not advance			
Carmen Weiler	50 metre backstroke	28.59	24	Did not advance			
Carmen Weiler	100 metre backstroke	1:00.87	21	Did not advance			
África Zamorano	200 metre backstroke	2:09.99	8 Q	2:10.76	11	Did not advance	
Carmen Weiler; Ainhoa Campabadal; África Zamorano; Paula Juste	4 × 100 m freestyle relay	3:42.53	16	—N/a		Did not advance	
Carla Carron; Ainhoa Campabadal; Alba Herrero; Paula Juste	4 × 200 m freestyle relay	8:03.62	14	—N/a		Did not advance	
Carmen Weiler (1:01.46); Jessica Vall (1:08.32); Paula Juste (1:00.27); Ainhoa Campabadal	4 × 100 m medley relay	4:05.85	20	—N/a		Did not advance	

Mixed

Athlete	Event	Heat		Final	
Athlete	Event	Time	Rank	Time	Rank
Sergio de Celis; Carles Coll; Carmen Weiler; Ainhoa Campabadal	4 × 100 m freestyle relay	3:29.06	17	Did not advance	

== Water polo ==
Summary

Team	Event	Group stage				Playoff	Quarterfinal	Semifinal	Final / BM	
Team	Event	Opposition Score	Opposition Score	Opposition Score	Rank	Opposition Score	Opposition Score	Opposition Score	Opposition Score	Rank
Spain	Men's tournament	Serbia; W 16–14	Montenegro; W 11–7	South Africa; W 27–6	1 Q	—N/a	France; W 7–6	Hungary; L 11–12	Serbia; W 9–6	3rd place, bronze medalist(s)
Spain	Women's tournament	Netherlands; L 6–7	Israel; W 22–5	Kazakhstan; W 24–5	2 QP	France; W 16–9	Hungary; W 12–9	Australia; W 12–10	Netherlands; L 16–17	2nd place, silver medalist(s)

=== Men's tournament ===
Team roster

The following is the Spanish roster.

Head coach: David Martín

- 1 Unai Aguirre GK
- 2 Alberto Munárriz FP
- 3 Álvaro Granados FP
- 4 Bernat Sanahuja FP
- 5 Miguel del Toro FP
- 6 Marc Larumbe FP
- 7 Martin Famera FP
- 8 Sergi Cabanas FP
- 9 Roger Tahull FP
- 10 Felipe Perrone FP
- 11 Blai Mallarach FP
- 12 Alejandro Bustos FP
- 13 Eduardo Lorrio GK
- Alberto Barroso FP
- Fran Valera FP

Group play

Pos	Team	Pld	W	PSW	PSL	L	GF	GA	GD	Pts	Qualification
1	Spain	3	3	0	0	0	54	27	+27	9	Quarterfinals
2	Serbia	3	1	1	0	1	57	34	+23	5	Playoffs
3	Montenegro	3	1	0	1	1	55	34	+21	4	Playoffs
4	South Africa	3	0	0	0	3	21	92	−71	0	

Source: Sportresult
Rules for classification: 1) points; 2) head-to-head points; 3) head-to-head goal difference; 4) head-to-head number of goals scored; 5) Goal difference.

17 July 2023; 20:30	Report	Serbia	14–16	Spain	Marine Messe Fukuoka, Fukuoka; Referees: Boris Margeta (SLO), Raffaele Colombo (ITA)
17 July 2023; 20:30	Report	Score by quarters: 2–3, 3–5, 5–5, 4–3			Marine Messe Fukuoka, Fukuoka; Referees: Boris Margeta (SLO), Raffaele Colombo (ITA)
17 July 2023; 20:30	Report	Rašović 6	Goals	Granados 5	Marine Messe Fukuoka, Fukuoka; Referees: Boris Margeta (SLO), Raffaele Colombo (ITA)

19 July 2023; 13:30	Report	Spain	11–7	Montenegro	Marine Messe Fukuoka, Fukuoka; Referees: Georgios Stavridis (GRE), Sebastien Dervieux (FRA)
19 July 2023; 13:30	Report	Score by quarters: 2–2, 3–2, 4–2, 2–1			Marine Messe Fukuoka, Fukuoka; Referees: Georgios Stavridis (GRE), Sebastien Dervieux (FRA)
19 July 2023; 13:30	Report	Perrone 5	Goals	Đurđić 2	Marine Messe Fukuoka, Fukuoka; Referees: Georgios Stavridis (GRE), Sebastien Dervieux (FRA)

21 July 2023; 10:30	Report	South Africa	6–27	Spain	Marine Messe Fukuoka, Fukuoka; Referees: Sebastien Dervieux (FRA), Natalia Markopoulou (GRE)
21 July 2023; 10:30	Report	Score by quarters: 2–8, 2–7, 2–8, 0–4			Marine Messe Fukuoka, Fukuoka; Referees: Sebastien Dervieux (FRA), Natalia Markopoulou (GRE)
21 July 2023; 10:30	Report	Badenhorst 2	Goals	Valera 5	Marine Messe Fukuoka, Fukuoka; Referees: Sebastien Dervieux (FRA), Natalia Markopoulou (GRE)

Quarterfinals

25 July 2023; 19:30	Report	Spain	7–6	France	Marine Messe Fukuoka, Fukuoka; Referees: Georgios Stavridis (GRE), Raffaele Colombo (ITA)
25 July 2023; 19:30	Report	Score by quarters: 1–2, 1–2, 2–1, 3–1			Marine Messe Fukuoka, Fukuoka; Referees: Georgios Stavridis (GRE), Raffaele Colombo (ITA)
25 July 2023; 19:30	Report	Tahull 2	Goals	Bouet, Crousillat 2	Marine Messe Fukuoka, Fukuoka; Referees: Georgios Stavridis (GRE), Raffaele Colombo (ITA)

Semifinals

27 July 2023; 18:30	Report	Hungary	12–11	Spain	Marine Messe Fukuoka, Fukuoka; Referees: Boris Margeta (SLO), Frank Ohme (GER)
27 July 2023; 18:30	Report	Score by quarters: 3–3, 1–3, 3–2, 5–3			Marine Messe Fukuoka, Fukuoka; Referees: Boris Margeta (SLO), Frank Ohme (GER)
27 July 2023; 18:30	Report	Manhercz 3	Goals	three players 2	Marine Messe Fukuoka, Fukuoka; Referees: Boris Margeta (SLO), Frank Ohme (GER)

Third place game

29 July 2023; 13:00	Report	Serbia	6–9	Spain	Marine Messe Fukuoka, Fukuoka; Referees: Frank Ohme (GER), Raffaele Colombo (ITA)
29 July 2023; 13:00	Report	Score by quarters: 3–3, 2–3, 0–2, 1–1			Marine Messe Fukuoka, Fukuoka; Referees: Frank Ohme (GER), Raffaele Colombo (ITA)
29 July 2023; 13:00	Report	Rašović 3	Goals	Granados 3	Marine Messe Fukuoka, Fukuoka; Referees: Frank Ohme (GER), Raffaele Colombo (ITA)

=== Women's tournament ===
Team roster

The following is the Spanish roster.

Head coach: Miki Oca

- 1 Laura Ester GK
- 2 Cristina Nogué FP
- 3 Anni Espar FP
- 4 Beatriz Ortiz FP
- 5 Nona Pérez FP
- 6 Paula Crespí FP
- 7 Elena Ruiz FP
- 8 Pili Peña FP
- 9 Judith Forca FP
- 10 Paula Camús FP
- 11 Maica García Godoy FP
- 12 Paula Leitón FP
- 13 Martina Terré GK
- Ariadna Ruiz FP

Group play

Pos	Team	Pld	W	PSW	PSL	L	GF	GA	GD	Pts	Qualification
1	Netherlands	3	3	0	0	0	61	16	+45	9	Quarterfinals
2	Spain	3	2	0	0	1	52	17	+35	6	Playoffs
3	Israel	3	1	0	0	2	30	52	−22	3	Playoffs
4	Kazakhstan	3	0	0	0	3	13	71	−58	0	

Source: Sportresult
Rules for classification: 1) points; 2) head-to-head points; 3) head-to-head goal difference; 4) head-to-head number of goals scored; 5) Goal difference.

16 July 2023; 12:00	Report	Netherlands	7–6	Spain	Marine Messe Fukuoka, Fukuoka; Referees: Alessia Ferrari (ITA), Nenad Peris (CRO)
16 July 2023; 12:00	Report	Score by quarters: 1–2, 1–1, 3–2, 2–1			Marine Messe Fukuoka, Fukuoka; Referees: Alessia Ferrari (ITA), Nenad Peris (CRO)
16 July 2023; 12:00	Report	three players 2	Goals	E. Ruiz 3	Marine Messe Fukuoka, Fukuoka; Referees: Alessia Ferrari (ITA), Nenad Peris (CRO)

18 July 2023; 10:30	Report	Spain	22–5	Israel	Marine Messe Fukuoka, Fukuoka; Referees: Lee-Anne Stewart (RSA), David Couper (NZL)
18 July 2023; 10:30	Report	Score by quarters: 5–2, 5–1, 5–0, 7–2			Marine Messe Fukuoka, Fukuoka; Referees: Lee-Anne Stewart (RSA), David Couper (NZL)
18 July 2023; 10:30	Report	Camus, A. Ruiz 4	Goals	five players 1	Marine Messe Fukuoka, Fukuoka; Referees: Lee-Anne Stewart (RSA), David Couper (NZL)

20 July 2023; 17:30	Report	Spain	24–5	Kazakhstan	Marine Messe Fukuoka, Fukuoka; Referees: Nóra Debreceni (HUN), Lee-Anne Stewart (RSA)
20 July 2023; 17:30	Report	Score by quarters: 5–3, 8–1, 5–0, 6–1			Marine Messe Fukuoka, Fukuoka; Referees: Nóra Debreceni (HUN), Lee-Anne Stewart (RSA)
20 July 2023; 17:30	Report	Peña 4	Goals	Novikova, Tsoy 2	Marine Messe Fukuoka, Fukuoka; Referees: Nóra Debreceni (HUN), Lee-Anne Stewart (RSA)

Playoffs

22 July 2023; 15:30	Report	France	9–16	Spain	Marine Messe Fukuoka, Fukuoka; Referees: Matan Schwartz (ISR), Raffaele Colombo (ITA)
22 July 2023; 15:30	Report	Score by quarters: 1–3, 4–4, 2–5, 2–4			Marine Messe Fukuoka, Fukuoka; Referees: Matan Schwartz (ISR), Raffaele Colombo (ITA)
22 July 2023; 15:30	Report	Bouloukbachi, Dhalluin 2	Goals	Forca 5	Marine Messe Fukuoka, Fukuoka; Referees: Matan Schwartz (ISR), Raffaele Colombo (ITA)

Quarterfinals

24 July 2023; 19:30	Report	Hungary	9–12	Spain	Marine Messe Fukuoka, Fukuoka; Referees: Alessia Ferrari (ITA), Nenad Peris (CRO)
24 July 2023; 19:30	Report	Score by quarters: 2–3, 2–3, 3–4, 2–2			Marine Messe Fukuoka, Fukuoka; Referees: Alessia Ferrari (ITA), Nenad Peris (CRO)
24 July 2023; 19:30	Report	Garda 4	Goals	Forca 5	Marine Messe Fukuoka, Fukuoka; Referees: Alessia Ferrari (ITA), Nenad Peris (CRO)

Semifinals

26 July 2023; 18:30	Report	Australia	10–12	Spain	Marine Messe Fukuoka, Fukuoka; Referees: Georgios Stavridis (GRE), Jennifer McCall (USA)
26 July 2023; 18:30	Report	Score by quarters: 2–5, 4–3, 2–2, 2–2			Marine Messe Fukuoka, Fukuoka; Referees: Georgios Stavridis (GRE), Jennifer McCall (USA)
26 July 2023; 18:30	Report	Kearns 3	Goals	E. Ruiz 4	Marine Messe Fukuoka, Fukuoka; Referees: Georgios Stavridis (GRE), Jennifer McCall (USA)

Final

28 July 2023; 18:00	Report	Netherlands	17–16 (PSO)	Spain	Marine Messe Fukuoka, Fukuoka; Referees: Nenad Peris (CRO), Alessia Ferrari (ITA)
28 July 2023; 18:00	Report	Score by quarters: 4–3, 2–3, 3–1, 3–5 PSO: 5–4			Marine Messe Fukuoka, Fukuoka; Referees: Nenad Peris (CRO), Alessia Ferrari (ITA)
28 July 2023; 18:00	Report	Van de Kraats, Sleeking 3	Goals	Forca 5	Marine Messe Fukuoka, Fukuoka; Referees: Nenad Peris (CRO), Alessia Ferrari (ITA)
