= Réka Rohács =

Hungarian swimmer

Personal information
- Born: 28 May 2000 (age 26)

Sport
- Sport: Swimming
Medal record
World Championships
Silver medal – second place	2022 Budapest	Team relay
European Championships
Silver medal – second place	2022 Rome	Team relay
Bronze medal – third place	2020 Budapest	Team relay

Réka Rohács (born 28 May 2000) is a Hungarian swimmer. She competed in the women's 5 km and women's 10 km events at the 2019 World Aquatics Championships held in Gwangju, South Korea. In the 5 km event she finished in 18th place and in the 10 km event she finished in 22nd place.

In 2021, she won the bronze medal in the team relay event at the 2020 European Aquatics Championships held in Budapest, Hungary. She also competed in the women's 10 km event.
