= Roman Dmytrijev =

Czech swimmer

Personal information
- Born: 19 January 1995 (age 31)

Sport
- Sport: Swimming

Roman Dmytrijev (born 19 January 1995) is a Czech swimmer. He competed in the men's 200 metre backstroke event at the 2017 World Aquatics Championships.
