= Paula Ruiz =

Spanish swimmer (born 1999)

Personal information
- Full name: Paula Ruiz Bravo
- Nationality: Spanish
- Born: 16 February 1999 (age 27) Málaga, Spain
- Height: 1.73 m (5 ft 8 in)

Sport
- Sport: Swimming

Paula Ruiz Bravo (Note: In this Spanish name, the first or paternal surname is Ruiz and the second or maternal family name is Bravo.) (born 16 February 1999) is a Spanish swimmer, specialising in open water events. She competed in the women's 10 km event at the 2019 World Aquatics Championships, finishing in 24th place.
