= Silvie Rybářová =

Czech swimmer

Personal information
- Born: August 25, 1985 (age 40) Brno, Czechoslovakia

Sport
- Sport: Swimming

Silvie Rybářová—Kodešová (born 25 August 1985) is a Czech female open water swimmer who represented the Czech Republic in the world championships. She resides in Brno.

She earned her M.S. and Ph.D. in physical education at the Faculty of Sports Studies of Masaryk University in Brno.

== Achievements ==
She participated in the following World Championships: 2005 Izmir (Turkey), 2007 Bangkok (Thailand), 2009 Belgrade (Serbia), 2011 Shenzhen (China), 2013 Barcelona (Spain), 2015 Kazan (Russia).

- 1st in the 20 km at the Czech Open Water Swimming 2012
- 9th in the 25 km at the 2011 World Swimming Championships

== Personal ==
Husband: Jan Kodeš (June 17, 2017), daughter: Terezka [2017]
