= 2023 World Aquatics Championships =

20th World Aquatics Championships

20th World Aquatics Championships
- Host city: Fukuoka, Japan
- Date: 14–30 July 2023
- Venue: 3
- Nations: 195
- Athletes: 2,392
- Opened by: Fumihito
- Closed by: Husain Al-Musallam

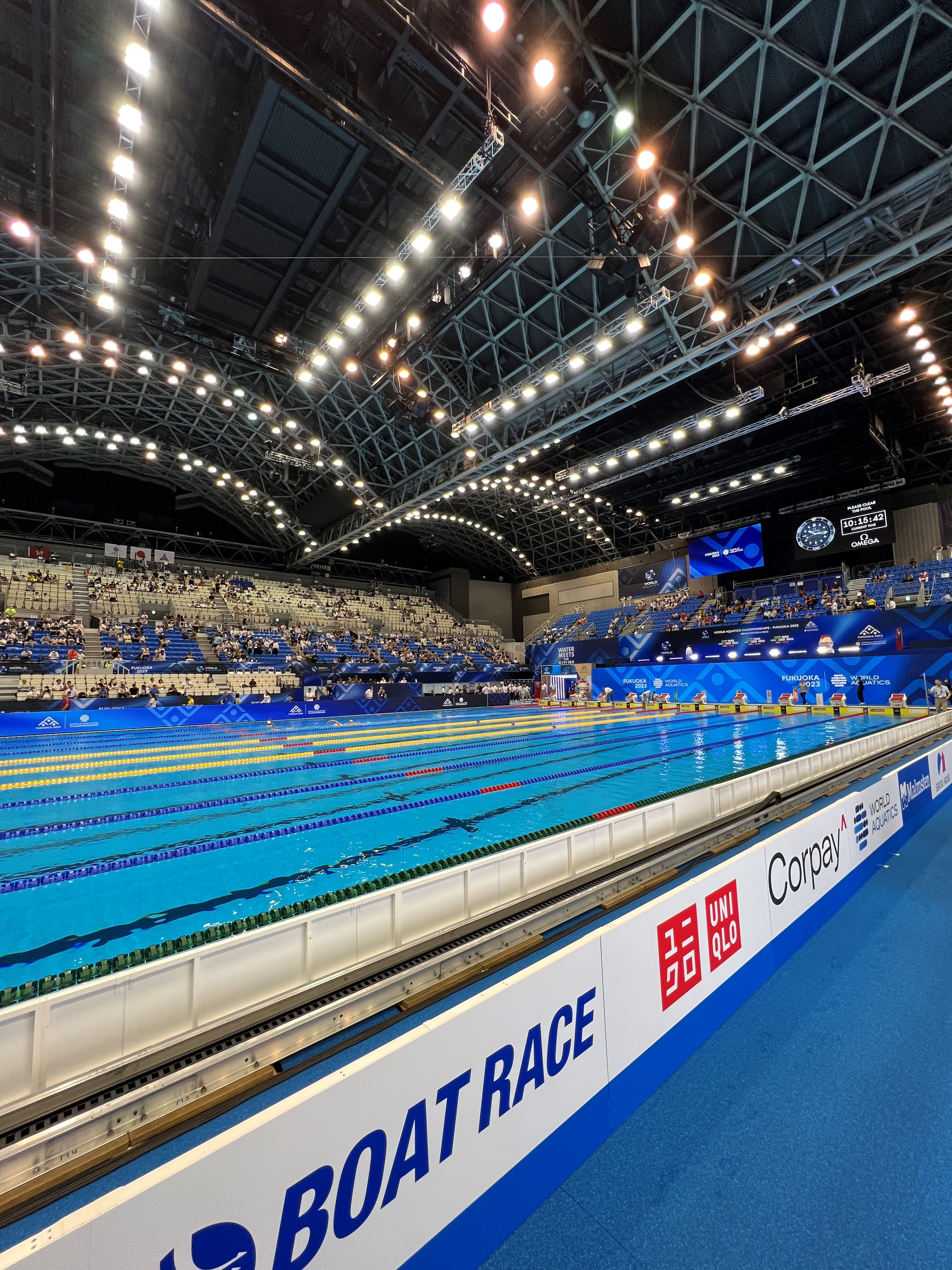
Marine Messe Hall A, Swimming & Artistic Swimming Venue, Fukuoka

The 2023 World Aquatics Championships, the 20th edition of the World Aquatics Championships, were held in Fukuoka, Japan, from 14 to 30 July 2023. Originally scheduled to be held in 2021 as the 19th championships, the championships were postponed until May 2022 in response to the rescheduling of the 2020 Summer Olympics in Tokyo to 2021 due to the COVID-19 pandemic. The event was pushed back a second time to 2023 due to ongoing travel restrictions and safety measures in place in Japan. In its place, Budapest hosted the 19th Championships from 18 June to 3 July 2022, while the originally scheduled 2023 championships in Doha, Qatar, were moved to 2024.

It was the second time Fukuoka hosted the event having previously held the 9th World Aquatics Championships in 2001, with South Africa's Roland Schoeman (swimming) and Brazil-Spain's Felipe Perrone (water polo) the only two athletes to compete in both the 2001 and 2023 championships.

The championships included 2,392 athletes competing from 192 member federations. While originally listed as 195 nations competing, due to the status of their member federation with World Aquatics, athletes from both the Philippines and Kenya were required to compete under the banner 'Suspended Member Federation', while two athletes of Syria competed under the banner 'World Aquatics Refugee Team'. World Aquatics ban on athletes from Russia and Belarus remained in effect for these championships.

These championships were the first edition of the championships to be held under the new World Aquatics branding following the renaming of FINA (French: Fédération Internationale de Natation) in December 2022.

== Host selection ==
The competition was originally to be held in Budapest, Hungary, in the summer of 2021. This was announced on 19 July 2013, at the biennial General Congress of World Aquatics (then FINA) in Barcelona, the host-city of the 2013 World Aquatics Championships.

However, in March 2015, it was announced that Budapest would instead host the 2017 Championships, after Guadalajara, Mexico, pulled out from the organization of the championships for financial reasons. A new bidding procedure was opened for both the 2021 and 2023 events.

On 9 June 2015, World Aquatics (then FINA) reported it had received expressions of interest for the 2021 and 2023 FINA World Championships from Argentina, Australia (Melbourne or Sydney), China (Wuhan or Nanjing), Germany (two potential cities), Japan, Turkey and Qatar. On 30 June 2015, an information meeting was organised for the nations and cities which had shown interest in bidding. This meeting was attended by representatives of cities from six countries: Abu Dhabi (United Arab Emirates), Buenos Aires (Argentina), Istanbul (Turkey), Nanjing (China), Fukuoka (Japan), Doha (Qatar). Bidding cities were then asked to present FINA with an executed Host City Agreement by October 26, 2015, and to make a formal presentation to the FINA Bureau on November 8, 2015. Australia and Germany were the first two countries to quit the bidding race and were followed by Argentina. Two others, Turkey and United Arab Emirates, had also shown interest, but withdrew before the presentation stage. With all other interested cities formerly withdrawing, on October 2, 2015, FINA executive director Cornel Marculescu confirmed there were three final bidders: Nanjing (China), Fukuoka (Japan), and Doha (Qatar).

On 31 January 2016, each of the bids were presented in a formal presentation at the FINA Bureau meeting in Budapest. After a vote, FINA announced Fukuoka as 2021 hosts and Doha as 2023 hosts.

In a press release issued on the same day, FINA President Julio Maglione stated that the bids from Fukuoka and Doha met all requirements and would host the championships under optimal conditions.

== Venues ==
The Fukuoka championships had three main venue precincts. Swimming, artistic swimming, the closing ceremony, and the international broadcast center, were all based at Marine Messe Fukuoka Hall A (part of the Fukuoka Convention Center), built for the 1995 Summer Universiade and also used during the 2001 World Aquatics Championships. Water polo events were based at the newly built Marine Messe Fukuoka Hall B. The opening ceremony was held at Boat Race Fukuoka in Fukuoka City.

- Marine Messe Fukuoka Hall A (swimming, artistic swimming, closing ceremony)
- Marine Messe Fukuoka Hall B (water polo)
- Fukuoka Prefectural Pool (diving)
- Seaside Momochi Beach Park (open water swimming, high diving)
- Boat Race Fukuoka (opening ceremony)

== Schedule ==
A total of 75 medal events were held across six disciplines. The program returned to the traditional schedule with artistic swimming, diving, and open water swimming staged during week one, swimming and high diving in week two, and water polo matches across both weeks.

●	Opening ceremony	●	Other competitions	●	Finals	●	Closing ceremony	M	Men's matches	W	Women's matches

July	14	15	16	17	18	19	20	21	22	23	24	25	26	27	28	29	30	Total
Ceremonies	●																●	-
Swimming										5	4	5	5	5	5	6	7	42
Open water swimming		1	1		2		1											5
Artistic swimming	●	1	2	2	1	2	1	1	1									11
Diving	●	3	2	2	1	1	1	1	2									13
High diving												●	1	1				2
Water polo			W	M	W	M	W	M	W	M	W	M	W	M	W	M		2
Total	0	5	5	4	4	3	3	2	3	5	4	5	6	6	6	7	7	75
Cumulative Total	0	5	10	14	18	21	24	26	29	34	38	43	49	55	61	68	75	75

== Medal table ==
* Host nation (Japan)

Rank	Nation	Gold	Silver	Bronze	Total
1	China	20	8	12	40
2	Australia	15	9	6	30
3	United States	7	22	15	44
4	Japan*	4	1	5	10
5	France	4	0	4	8
6	Germany	4	0	3	7
7	Spain	3	2	4	9
8	Italy	2	7	5	14
9	Great Britain	2	5	5	12
10	Canada	2	3	5	10
11	Hungary	2	2	0	4
12	Tunisia	2	1	0	3
13	Lithuania	2	0	0	2
13	Sweden	2	0	0	2
15	Netherlands	1	2	2	5
16	Austria	1	2	0	3
17	Romania	1	1	0	2
17	South Africa	1	1	0	2
19	Mexico	0	5	2	7
20	Ukraine	0	1	1	2
21	Colombia	0	1	0	1
21	Greece	0	1	0	1
21	Hong Kong	0	1	0	1
21	Poland	0	1	0	1
21	Portugal	0	1	0	1
26	Brazil	0	0	1	1
26	Kazakhstan	0	0	1	1
26	New Zealand	0	0	1	1
26	South Korea	0	0	1	1
26	Switzerland	0	0	1	1
Totals (30 entries)		75	77	74	226

Source: World Aquatics

== Participating countries ==
- Afghanistan (1)
- Albania (4)
- Algeria (2)
- American Samoa (1)
- Andorra (2)
- Angola (6)
- Anguilla (1)
- Antigua and Barbuda (4)
- Argentina (36)
- Armenia (6)
- Athlete Refugee Team (2)
- Aruba (7)
- Australia (91)
- Austria (20)
- Bahamas (4)
- Bahrain (4)
- Bangladesh (2)
- Barbados (4)
- Belgium (14)
- Benin (2)
- Bermuda (4)
- Bhutan (2)
- Bolivia (7)
- Bosnia and Herzegovina (4)
- Botswana (2)
- Brazil (41)
- Brunei (3)
- Bulgaria (6)
- Burkina Faso (2)
- Burundi (4)
- Cambodia (2)
- Cameroon (3)
- Canada (80)
- Cape Verde (4)
- Cayman Islands (3)
- Central African Republic (1)
- Chile (16)
- China (105)
- Chinese Taipei (10)
- Colombia (15)
- Comoros (2)
- Cook Islands (2)
- Costa Rica (12)
- Croatia (23)
- Cuba (12)
- Curaçao (2)
- Cyprus (4)
- Czech Republic (10)
- Denmark (6)
- Djibouti (2)
- Dominica (1)
- Dominican Republic (6)
- Ecuador (4)
- Egypt (28)
- El Salvador (2)
- Estonia (5)
- Eswatini (4)
- Ethiopia (2)
- Faroe Islands (2)
- Federated States of Micronesia (4)
- Fiji (4)
- Finland (6)
- France (85)
- Gabon (2)
- The Gambia (3)
- Georgia (6)
- Germany (46)
- Ghana (3)
- Great Britain (55)
- Greece (61)
- Grenada (2)
- Guam (4)
- Guatemala (5)
- Guinea (4)
- Guinea-Bissau (1)
- Guyana (3)
- Haiti (2)
- Honduras (3)
- Hong Kong (15)
- Hungary (61)
- Iceland (2)
- India (10)
- Indonesia (9)
- Iran (2)
- Iraq (2)
- Ireland (15)
- Israel (43)
- Italy (90)
- Ivory Coast (0)
- Jamaica (3)
- Japan (102)
- Jordan (4)
- Kazakhstan (50)
- Kosovo (2)
- Kuwait (7)
- Kyrgyzstan (2)
- Laos (3)
- Latvia (5)
- Lebanon (4)
- Lesotho (1)
- Libya (2)
- Liechtenstein (2)
- Lithuania (9)
- Luxembourg (4)
- Macau (17)
- Madagascar (2)
- Malawi (4)
- Malaysia (17)
- Maldives (4)
- Mali (1)
- Malta (5)
- Marshall Islands (2)
- Mauritius (3)
- Mexico (48)
- Moldova (3)
- Monaco (1)
- Mongolia (4)
- Montenegro (17)
- Morocco (3)
- Mozambique (3)
- Namibia (2)
- Nepal (4)
- Netherlands (40)
- New Zealand (49)
- Nicaragua (2)
- Niger (2)
- Nigeria (4)
- North Macedonia (4)
- Northern Mariana Islands (4)
- Norway (7)
- Oman (2)
- Pakistan (4)
- Palau (4)
- Palestine (4)
- Panama (4)
- Papua New Guinea (4)
- Paraguay (4)
- Peru (10)
- Poland (17)
- Portugal (14)
- Puerto Rico (12)
- Qatar (4)
- Republic of the Congo (2)
- Romania (7)
- Rwanda (2)
- Saint Kitts and Nevis (1)
- Saint Lucia (2)
- Saint Vincent and the Grenadines (4)
- Samoa (4)
- San Marino (3)
- Saudi Arabia (2)
- Senegal (4)
- Serbia (23)
- Seychelles (4)
- Sierra Leone (2)
- Singapore (27)
- Sint Maarten (0)
- Slovakia (18)
- Slovenia (8)
- Solomon Islands (1)
- South Africa (51)
- South Korea (38)
- Spain (75)
- Sri Lanka (3)
- Sudan (2)
- Suriname (2)
- Suspended Member Federation (9)
- Sweden (19)
- Switzerland (16)
- Syria (2)
- Tajikistan (2)
- Tanzania (4)
- Thailand (23)
- (Timor-Leste) Timor Leste (2)
- Togo (2)
- Tonga (4)
- Trinidad and Tobago (2)
- Tunisia (3)
- Turkey (11)
- Turkmenistan (4)
- Turks and Caicos Islands (2)
- Uganda (6)
- Ukraine (22)
- United Arab Emirates (2)
- United States (120)
- Uruguay (7)
- Uzbekistan (8)
- Vanuatu (2)
- Venezuela (12)
- Vietnam (10)
- Virgin Islands (3)
- Yemen (2)
- Zambia (3)
- Zimbabwe (4)

== See also ==
- 2023 World Para Swimming Championships in Manchester, United Kingdom
