= Anna Kolářová (swimmer) =

Czech swimmer

Personal information
- Born: 17 April 1997 (age 29)

Sport
- Sport: Swimming

Anna Kolářová (born 17 April 1997) is a Czech swimmer. She competed in the women's 200 metre freestyle event at the 2017 World Aquatics Championships.
