= Leonie Beck =

German swimmer (born 1997)

Personal information
- Nationality: German
- Born: 27 May 1997 (age 29) Augsburg, Germany
- Height: 1.82 m (6 ft 0 in)
- Weight: 62 kg (137 lb)

Sport
- Sport: Swimming
- Strokes: Freestyle
Medal record
Women's swimming
Representing Germany
World Championships
Gold medal – first place	2022 Budapest	Team open water
Gold medal – first place	2023 Fukuoka	5 km open water
Gold medal – first place	2023 Fukuoka	10 km open water
Silver medal – second place	2022 Budapest	10 km open water
Bronze medal – third place	2019 Gwangju	5 km open water
European Championships
Gold medal – first place	2022 Rome	10 km open water
Gold medal – first place	2024 Belgrade	5 km open water
Gold medal – first place	2024 Belgrade	10 km open water
Silver medal – second place	2018 Glasgow	5 km open water
Silver medal – second place	2018 Glasgow	Team relay
Silver medal – second place	2020 Budapest	Team relay

Leonie Antonia Beck (born 27 May 1997) is a German swimmer. She competed in the women's 800 metre freestyle event at the 2016 Summer Olympics.

At the 2022 European Aquatics Championships, held in Rome, Italy with open water swimming at Ostia in August, Beck won the gold medal in the 10 kilometre open water swim with a time of 2:01:13.4.

As part of the 2023 FINA Open Water Tour, Beck first won the gold medal in the 10 kilometre open water swim at the first leg, in Egypt in early May, with a time of 2:04:05.60 before following up with a gold medal victory also in the 10 kilometre swim on 20 May at the second leg, held in Golfo Aranci, Italy, with a time of 1:56:17.40.
