= Jan Šefl =

Czech swimmer

Personal information
- Nationality: Czech
- Born: 10 May 1990 (age 36)

Sport
- Sport: Swimming
- Strokes: Butterfly
- Club: Slávia VŠ Plzeň (2001-2020); Ústí Swimming Academy (2020 - present)

Jan Šefl (born 10 May 1990) is a Czech swimmer. He competed in the men's 50 metre butterfly event at the 2017 World Aquatics Championships. He represented the Czech Republic in men's 100 metre butterfly event at the 2020 Summer Olympic Games in Tokyo. He holds the men's Czech national record in the event. He currently works as a maintenance technician at the Plzen swimming pool.
