= Angélica André =

Portuguese swimmer (born 1994)

Personal information
- Nationality: Portuguese
- Born: 13 October 1994 (age 31) Matosinhos, Portugal
- Height: 1.64 m (5 ft 5 in)
- Weight: 58 kg (128 lb)

Sport
- Sport: Swimming
- Strokes: Freestlye
Medal record
Women's swimming
Representing Portugal
World Championships
Bronze medal – third place	2024 Doha	10 km open water
European Championships
Bronze medal – third place	2022 Rome	10 km open water

Angélica Maria Ribeiro André (born 13 October 1994) is a Portuguese swimmer specialising in open water events. She competed in the women's 10 km event at the 2019 World Aquatics Championships and she finished in 19th place. She also competed in the women's 25 km event, but did not finish the race.
