= Matěj Kozubek =

Czech swimmer

Personal information
- Nationality: Czech Republic
- Born: 11 May 1996 (age 30) Prague, Czech Republic
- Height: 1.83 m (6 ft 0 in)

Sport
- Sport: Swimming
- Event: Marathon swimming

Matěj Kozubek (born 11 May 1996) is a Czech marathon swimmer. He competed in the 2020 Summer Olympics.
