= Anna Olasz =

Hungarian swimmer

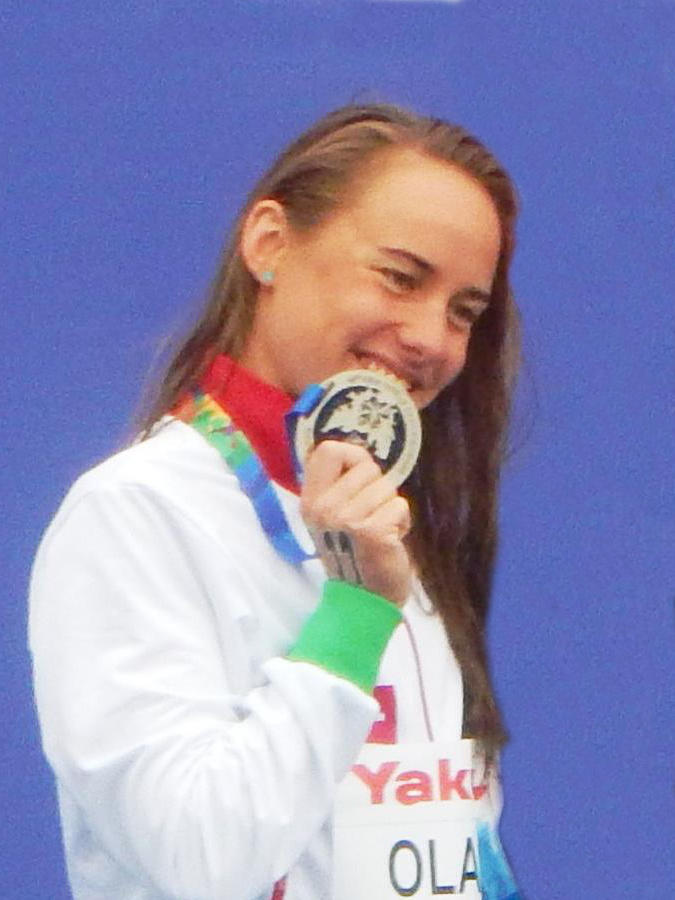
- Olasz in 2015

Personal information
- Nationality: Hungarian
- Born: 19 September 1993 (age 33) Szeged, Hungary
- Height: 1.67 m (5 ft 6 in)
- Weight: 55 kg (121 lb)

Sport
- Sport: Swimming
- Strokes: Open water swimming
Medal record
Women's open water swimming
Representing Hungary
World Championships
Silver medal – second place	2015 Kazan	25 km marathon
Silver medal – second place	2022 Budapest	Team relay
Silver medal – second place	2023 Fukuoka	Team relay
European Championships
Silver medal – second place	2020 Budapest	10 km open water
Silver medal – second place	2022 Rome	Team relay
Bronze medal – third place	2020 Budapest	Team relay

Anna Olasz (born 19 September 1993) is a Hungarian swimmer. She competed in the women's marathon 10 kilometre event at the 2016 Summer Olympics. In 2020, she won the silver medal in the women's 10 km event at the 2020 European Aquatics Championships held in Budapest, Hungary, and the bronze medal in the team relay event.
