= Lenka Pavlacká =

Czech swimmer

Personal information
- Born: 8 August 1994 (age 31)

Sport
- Sport: Swimming

Lenka Pavlacká, née Štěrbová (born 8 August 1994) is a Czech swimmer. She represented the Czech Republic at the 2015 World Aquatics Championships in Kazan, Russia, at the 2017 World Aquatics Championships in Budapest, Hungary and at the 2019 World Aquatics Championships in Gwangju, South Korea.

In 2019, she competed in all three women's long-distance swimming competitions: in the 5 km event she finished in 36th place, in the 10 km event she finished in 40th place and in the 25 km event she finished in 15th place.
