= Alena Benešová =

Czech swimmer (born 1998)

Personal information
- Born: 16 April 1998 (age 28)

Sport
- Sport: Swimming

Alena Benešová (born 16 April 1998) is a Czech swimmer. She represented the Czech Republic at the 2015 World Aquatics Championships in Kazan, Russia, at the 2017 World Aquatics Championships in Budapest, Hungary and at the 2019 World Aquatics Championships in Gwangju, South Korea.

In 2018, she finished in 6th place in the women's 5 km at the 2018 European Aquatics Championships.

In 2019, she competed in the women's 10 km event at the 2019 World Aquatics Championships and she finished in 34th place. She also competed in the women's 5 km event and she finished in 25th place.
