= South Korea at the 2023 World Aquatics Championships =

- Flag of South Korea
- World Aquatics code: KOR
- National federation: Korea Swimming Federation

in Fukuoka, Japan
- Competitors: 38 in 5 sports
- Medals Ranked 26th: Gold 0 Silver 0 Bronze 1 Total 1

World Aquatics Championships appearances
- 1973; 1975; 1978; 1982; 1986; 1991; 1994; 1998; 2001; 2003; 2005; 2007; 2009; 2011; 2013; 2015; 2017; 2019; 2022; 2023; 2024; 2025

South Korea competed at the 2023 World Aquatics Championships in Fukuoka, Japan from 14 to 30 July.

== Medalists ==
Medal	Name	Sport	Event	Date
Bronze	Hwang Sun-woo	Swimming	Men's 200 m freestyle	July 25

== Athletes by discipline ==
The following is the list of number of competitors participating at the Championships per discipline.

Sport	Men	Women	Total
Artistic swimming	1	3	4
Diving	3	5	8
High diving	1	0	1
Open water swimming	2	2	4
Swimming	14	7	21
Total	21	17	38

== Artistic swimming ==
Women

Athlete	Event	Preliminaries		Final	
Athlete	Event	Points	Rank	Points	Rank
Lee Ri-young	Solo technical routine	201.7866	8 Q	200.8383	9
Hur Yoon-seo	Solo free routine	185.9500	4 Q	186.6167	6
Lee Ri-young; Hur Yoon-seo	Duet technical routine	204.8133	13	Did not advance	
Lee Ri-young; Hur Yoon-seo	Duet free routine	169.6645	13	Did not advance	

Mixed

Athlete	Event	Preliminaries		Final	
Athlete	Event	Points	Rank	Points	Rank
Byun Jae-jun; Kim Ji-hye	Duet technical routine	188.9558	6 Q	190.2934	10
Byun Jae-jun; Kim Ji-hye	Duet free routine	125.3708	11 Q	125.1542	10

== Diving ==
South Korea entered 8 divers.

Men

Athlete	Event	Preliminaries		Semifinals		Final	
Athlete	Event	Points	Rank	Points	Rank	Points	Rank
Kim Yeong-taek	1 m springboard	256.00	50	—N/a		Did not advance	
Kim Yeong-taek	10 m platform	402.40	11 Q	425.90	8 Q	405.85	11
Woo Ha-ram	1 m springboard	362.65	9 Q	—N/a		385.50	7
Woo Ha-ram	3 m springboard	382.40	19	Did not advance			
Yi Jae-gyeong	3 m springboard	349.70	35	Did not advance			
Yi Jae-gyeong	10 m platform	377.40	17 Q	396.55	14	Did not advance	
Woo Ha-ram; Yi Jae-gyeong	3 m synchro springboard	331.62	18	—N/a		Did not advance	
Kim Yeong-taek; Yi Jae-gyeong	10 m synchro platform	348.78	12 Q	—N/a		347.88	10

Women

Athlete	Event	Preliminaries		Semifinals		Final	
Athlete	Event	Points	Rank	Points	Rank	Points	Rank
Cho Eun-bi	10 m platform	240.50	30	Did not advance			
Kim Na-hyun	1 m springboard	234.40	14	—N/a		Did not advance	
Kim Su-ji	1 m springboard	229.40	19	—N/a		Did not advance	
Kim Su-ji	3 m springboard	285.05	11 Q	283.60	16	Did not advance	
Moon Na-yun	10 m platform	257.55	23	Did not advance			
Park Ha-reum	3 m springboard	227.05	37	Did not advance			
Kim Su-ji; Park Ha-reum	3 m synchro springboard	255.84	12 Q	—N/a		194.04	12
Cho Eun-bi; Moon Na-yun	10 m synchro platform	209.04	11 Q	—N/a		222.12	11

Mixed

Athlete	Event	Final	
Athlete	Event	Points	Rank
Yi Jae-gyeong; Kim Su-ji	3 m synchro springboard	281.46	4
Kim Yeong-taek; Moon Na-yun	10 m synchro platform	256.50	9
Kim Su-ji; Yi Jae-gyeong; Cho Eun-bi; Kim Yeong-taek	Team event	345.60	8

== High diving ==
Athlete	Event	Points	Rank
Choi Byung-hwa	Men's high diving	187.50	23

== Open water swimming ==
South Korea entered 4 open water swimmers.

Men

Athlete	Event	Time	Rank
Park Jae-hun	Men's 5 km	57:49.5	34
Park Jae-hun	Men's 10 km	2:00:09.5	39
Sung Jun-ho	Men's 5 km	1:02:17.0	58
Sung Jun-ho	Men's 10 km	2:06:23.8	59

Women

Athlete	Event	Time	Rank
Lee Hae-rim	Women's 5 km	1:02:33.9	39
Lee Hae-rim	Women's 10 km	2:12:43.0	42
Lee Jeong-min	Women's 5 km	1:02:30.1	38
Lee Jeong-min	Women's 10 km	2:13:41.0	47

Mixed

Athlete	Event	Time	Rank
Lee Hae-rim; Lee Jeong-min; Park Jae-hun; Sung Jun-ho	Team relay	1:19:28.7	18

== Swimming ==
South Korea entered 22 swimmers.

Men

Athlete	Event	Heat		Semifinal		Final	
Athlete	Event	Time	Rank	Time	Rank	Time	Rank
Baek In-chul	50 metre butterfly	23.50	23	Did not advance			
Cho Sung-jae	200 metre breaststroke	2:12.77	26	Did not advance			
Choi Dong-yeol	50 metre breaststroke	27.48	19	Did not advance			
Choi Dong-yeol	100 metre breaststroke	59.94	12 Q	59.59 NR	11	Did not advance	
Hwang Sun-woo	100 metre freestyle	48.20	12 Q	48.08	9	Did not advance	
Hwang Sun-woo	200 metre freestyle	1:46.69	13 Q	1:45.07	3 Q	1:44.42 NR	3rd place, bronze medalist(s)
Ji Yu-chan	50 metre freestyle	22.17	24	Did not advance			
Kim Min-suk	200 metre individual medley	2:01.75	25	Did not advance			
Kim Min-suk	400 metre individual medley	4:22.17	21	—N/a		Did not advance	
Kim Woo-min	400 metre freestyle	3:44.52	6 Q	—N/a		3:43.92	5
Kim Woo-min	800 metre freestyle	7:47.69 NR	14	—N/a		Did not advance	
Kim Woo-min	1500 metre freestyle	Did not start					
Kim Young-beom	100 metre butterfly	52.80	31	Did not advance			
Lee Ho-joon	200 metre freestyle	1:46.21	5 Q	1:45.93	6 Q	1:46.04	6
Lee Ju-ho	100 metre backstroke	54.21	20	Did not advance			
Lee Ju-ho	200 metre backstroke	1:57.99	10 Q	1:58.05	13	Did not advance	
Moon Seung-woo	200 metre butterfly	1:57.79	21	Did not advance			
Won Young-jun	50 metre backstroke	25.18	19	Did not advance			
Lee Ho-joon; Ji Yu-chan; Yang Jae-hoon; Kim Ji-heun	4 × 100 m freestyle relay	3:16.15	17	—N/a		Did not advance	
Hwang Sun-woo; Kim Woo-min; Yang Jae-hoon; Lee Ho-joon	4 × 200 m freestyle relay	7:06.82 NR	6 Q	—N/a		7:04.07 NR	6
Lee Ju-ho; Choi Dong-yeol; Kim Young-beom; Hwang Sun-woo	4 × 100 m medley relay	3:34.25 NR	10	—N/a		Did not advance	

Women

Athlete	Event	Heat		Semifinal		Final	
Athlete	Event	Time	Rank	Time	Rank	Time	Rank
Han Da-kyung	400 metre freestyle	4:11.08	18	—N/a		Did not advance	
Han Da-kyung	800 metre freestyle	8:43.68	26	—N/a		Did not advance	
Han Da-kyung	1500 metre freestyle	17:01.57	26	—N/a		Did not advance	
Hur Yeon-kyung	100 metre freestyle	54.97	20	Did not advance			
Hur Yeon-kyung	200 metre freestyle	2:01.19	34	Did not advance			
Jeong So-eun	50 metre freestyle	25.45	26	Did not advance			
Kim Seo-yeong	200 metre individual medley	2:11.50	14 Q	2:12.91	13	Did not advance	
Kim Seo-yeong	400 metre individual medley	4:45.04	19	—N/a		Did not advance	
Kwon Se-hyun	200 metre breaststroke	2:27.93	23	Did not advance			
Lee Eun-ji	50 metre backstroke	28.40	19	Did not advance			
Lee Eun-ji	100 metre backstroke	1:00.56	18	Did not advance			
Lee Eun-ji	200 metre backstroke	2:11.78	14 Q	2:13.65	16	Did not advance	
Park Su-jin	100 metre butterfly	1:00.20	28	Did not advance			
Park Su-jin	200 metre butterfly	2:11.20	18	Did not advance			
Kim Seo-yeong; Hur Yeon-kyung; Han Da-kyung; Park Su-jin	4 × 200 m freestyle relay	8:05.40	15	—N/a		Did not advance	
Lee Eun-ji; Kwon Se-hyun; Kim Seo-yeong; Hur Yeon-kyung	4 × 100 m medley relay	4:05.16	18	—N/a		Did not advance	

Mixed

Athlete	Event	Heat		Final	
Athlete	Event	Time	Rank	Time	Rank
Ji Yu-chan; Yang Jae-hoon; Hur Yeon-kyung; Jeong So-eun	4 × 100 m freestyle relay	3:27.99 NR	13	Did not advance	
Lee Eun-ji; Choi Dong-yeol; Kim Young-beom; Hur Yeon-kyung	4 × 100 m medley relay	3:47.09	13	Did not advance	
