= Great Britain at the 2023 World Aquatics Championships =

- Flag of Great Britain
- World Aquatics code: GBR
- National federation: British Swimming
- Website: britishswimming.org

in Fukuoka, Japan
- Competitors: 55 in 5 sports
- Medals Ranked 9th: Gold 2 Silver 5 Bronze 5 Total 12

World Aquatics Championships appearances
- 1973; 1975; 1978; 1982; 1986; 1991; 1994; 1998; 2001; 2003; 2005; 2007; 2009; 2011; 2013; 2015; 2017; 2019; 2022; 2023; 2024; 2025

Great Britain is set to compete at the 2023 World Aquatics Championships in Fukuoka, Japan from 14 to 30 July.

== Medalists ==
Medal	Name	Sport	Event	Date
1st place, gold medalist(s)	Matt Richards	Swimming	Men's 200 m freestyle	25 July 2023
1st place, gold medalist(s)	Duncan Scott Matthew Richards James Guy Tom Dean; Joe Litchfield (heat)	Swimming	Men’s 4 × 200 m freestyle relay	28 July 2023
2nd place, silver medalist(s)	Jack Laugher; Anthony Harding	Diving	Men's 3 m synchro springboard	15 July 2023
2nd place, silver medalist(s)	Andrea Spendolini-Sirieix; Lois Toulson	Diving	Women's 10 m synchro platform	16 July 2023
2nd place, silver medalist(s)	Yasmin Harper; Scarlett Mew Jensen	Diving	Women's 3 m synchro springboard	17 July 2023
2nd place, silver medalist(s)	Tom Dean	Swimming	Men's 200 m freestyle	25 July 2023
2nd place, silver medalist(s)	Duncan Scott	Swimming	Men's 200 m individual medley	27 July 2023
3rd place, bronze medalist(s)	Kate Shortman	Artistic swimming	Women's solo free routine	19 July 2023
3rd place, bronze medalist(s)	Lauren Cox	Swimming	Women's 50 m backstroke	27 July 2023
3rd place, bronze medalist(s)	Tom Dean	Swimming	Men's 200 m individual medley	27 July 2023
3rd place, bronze medalist(s)	Benjamin Proud	Swimming	Men's 50 m freestyle	29 July 2023
3rd place, bronze medalist(s)	Matt Richards Duncan Scott Anna Hopkin Freya Anderson; Jacob Whittle (heat) Tom Dean (heat) Lucy Hope (heat)	Swimming	Mixed 4 × 100 m freestyle relay	29 July 2023

== Athletes by discipline ==
The following is the list of number of competitors participating at the Championships per discipline.

Sport	Men	Women	Total
Artistic swimming	1	11	12
Diving	7	4	11
High diving	1	0	1
Open water swimming	1	2	3
Swimming	16	12	28
Total	26	29	55

== Artistic swimming ==
Men

Athlete	Event	Preliminaries		Final	
Athlete	Event	Points	Rank	Points	Rank
Ranjuo Tomblin	Solo technical routine	166.8601	6 Q	193.7500	5
Ranjuo Tomblin	Solo free routine	172.5166	3 Q	166.1792	5

Women

Athlete	Event	Preliminaries		Final	
Athlete	Event	Points	Rank	Points	Rank
Kate Shortman	Solo technical routine	223.6033	5 Q	192.0267	12
Kate Shortman	Solo free routine	213.8417	2 Q	219.9542	3rd place, bronze medalist(s)
Kate Shortman; Isabelle Thorpe	Duet technical routine	226.9067	10 Q	228.3801	8
Kate Shortman; Isabelle Thorpe	Duet free routine	184.6145	10 Q	226.4834	5

Mixed

Athlete	Event	Preliminaries		Final	
Athlete	Event	Points	Rank	Points	Rank
Beatrice Crass; Ranjuo Tomblin	Duet technical routine	190.0833	5 Q	215.2967	5
Beatrice Crass; Ranjuo Tomblin	Duet free routine	150.6208	6 Q	151.5416	5
Eleanor Blinkhorn; Isobel Blinkhorn; Millicent Costello; Isobel Davies; Cerys Hughes; Aimee Lawrence; Daniella Lloyd; Robyn Swatman	Team acrobatic routine	169.4567	13	Did not advance	
Eleanor Blinkhorn; Isobel Blinkhorn; Millicent Costello; Isobel Davies; Aimee Lawrence; Daniella Lloyd; Robyn Swatman; Isabelle Thorpe	Team technical routine	186.8912	15	Did not advance	
Eleanor Blinkhorn; Isobel Blinkhorn; Millicent Costello; Beatrice Crass; Isobel Davies; Aimee Lawrence; Daniella Lloyd; Robyn Swatman	Team free routine	225.5188	8 Q	217.1897	10

== Diving ==
Great Britain entered 11 divers.

Men

Athlete	Event	Preliminaries		Semifinals		Final	
Athlete	Event	Points	Rank	Points	Rank	Points	Rank
Daniel Goodfellow	3 m springboard	459.70	2 Q	477.20	3 Q	438.05	6
Jordan Houlden	1 m springboard	374.90	3 Q	—		382.90	8
Jordan Houlden	3 m springboard	368.55	22	Did not advance			
Kyle Kothari	10 m platform	423.70	6 Q	475.60	5 Q	497.35	5
Noah Williams	10 m platform	435.15	4 Q	450.65	6 Q	499.10	4
Jack Laugher; Anthony Harding	3 m synchro springboard	383.46	3 Q	—		424.62	2nd place, silver medalist(s)
Matty Lee; Noah Williams	10 m synchro platform	429.18	2 Q	—		419.82	4

Women

Athlete	Event	Preliminaries		Semifinals		Final	
Athlete	Event	Points	Rank	Points	Rank	Points	Rank
Yasmin Harper	3 m springboard	266.10	24	Did not advance			
Scarlett Mew Jensen	3 m springboard	288.60	10 Q	302.05	10 Q	299.10	9
Andrea Spendolini-Sirieix	10 m platform	353.90	3 Q	305.20	13	Did not advance	
Lois Toulson	10 m platform	293.50	12 Q	313.90	9 Q	319.30	5
Yasmin Harper; Scarlett Mew Jensen	3 m synchro springboard	294.72	3 Q	—		296.58	2nd place, silver medalist(s)
Andrea Spendolini-Sirieix; Lois Toulson	10 m synchro platform	293.22	3 Q	—		311.76	2nd place, silver medalist(s)

== High diving ==
Athlete	Event	Points	Rank
Aidan Heslop	Men's high diving	413.05	5

== Open water swimming ==
Great Britain entered 3 open water swimmers.

Men

Athlete	Event	Time	Rank
Hector Pardoe	Men's 5 km	56:46.5	15
Hector Pardoe	Men's 10 km	1:53:04.2	10

Women

Athlete	Event	Time	Rank
Leah Crisp	Women's 10 km	2:05:03.5	24
Amber Keegan	Women's 5 km	1:02:35.5	41
Amber Keegan	Women's 10 km	2:03:30.3	18

== Swimming ==
Great Britain entered 29 swimmers.

Men

Athlete	Event	Heat		Semifinal		Final	
Athlete	Event	Time	Rank	Time	Rank	Time	Rank
Cameron Brooker	100 m backstroke	54.54	25	Did not advance			
Lewis Burras	50 m freestyle	22.14	22	Did not advance			
Lewis Burras	100 m freestyle	48.99	31	Did not advance			
Greg Butler	200 m breaststroke	2:12.52	23	Did not advance			
Tom Dean	200 m freestyle	1:46.02	4 Q	1:45.29	4 Q	1:44.32	2nd place, silver medalist(s)
Tom Dean	200 m individual medley	1:58.20	6 Q	1:57.18	7 Q	1:56.07	3rd place, bronze medalist(s)
James Guy	100 m butterfly	51.50	11 Q	51.43	10	Did not advance	
Daniel Jervis	800 m freestyle	7:55.92	23	—		Did not advance	
Daniel Jervis	1500 m freestyle	14:57.88	14	—		Did not advance	
Oliver Morgan	100 m backstroke	53.52	5 Q	53.26	9	Did not advance	
Oliver Morgan	200 m backstroke	1:57.61	6 Q	1:57.50	9	Did not advance	
Jacob Peters	50 m butterfly	22.85	2 Q	22.92	3 Q	22.84	4
Jacob Peters	100 m butterfly	51.77; 51.39	16 S/off; 1 Q	51.51	12	Did not advance	
Ben Proud	50 m freestyle	21.90	7 Q	21.61	3 Q	21.58	3rd place, bronze medalist(s)
Ben Proud	50 m butterfly	23.27	9 Q	22.96	6 Q	22.91	5
Matt Richards	100 m freestyle	47.59 NR	1 Q	47.47 NR	1 Q	47.45	5
Matt Richards	200 m freestyle	1:45.82	2 Q	1:45.40	5 Q	1:44.30	1st place, gold medalist(s)
Duncan Scott	200 m individual medley	1:57.76	1 Q	1:56.50	2 Q	1:55.95	2nd place, silver medalist(s)
Luke Turley	400 m freestyle	3:51.95	26	—		Did not advance	
Luke Turley	800 m freestyle	7:55.84	22	—		Did not advance	
James Wilby	100 m breaststroke	59.66	8 Q	59.54	10	Did not advance	
Brodie Williams	200 m backstroke	1:57.92	9 Q	1:57.93	11	Did not advance	
Lewis Burras; Matt Richards; Jacob Whittle; Duncan Scott	4 × 100 m freestyle relay	Disqualified		—		Did not advance	
Duncan Scott; Matthew Richards; James Guy; Tom Dean; Joe Litchfield	4 × 200 m freestyle relay	7:06.20	4 Q	—		6:59.08	1st place, gold medalist(s)
Oliver Morgan; James Wilby; Jacob Peters; Matt Richards; James Guy; Tom Dean	4 × 100 m medley relay	3:33.27	8 Q	—		3:30.16	5

Women

Athlete	Event	Heat		Semifinal		Final	
Athlete	Event	Time	Rank	Time	Rank	Time	Rank
Freya Anderson	200 m freestyle	1:57.12	7 Q	1:55.85	6 Q	1:56.33	7
Freya Colbert	400 m freestyle	4:09.02	13	—		Did not advance	
Freya Colbert	400 m individual medley	4:38.29	4 Q	—		4:35.28	5
Lauren Cox	50 m backstroke	27.98	11 Q	27.29	3 Q	27.20	3rd place, bronze medalist(s)
Lauren Cox	100 m backstroke	1:00.10	11 Q	59.79	10	Did not advance	
Kara Hanlon	100 m breaststroke	1:07.52	23	Did not advance			
Kara Hanlon	200 m breaststroke	2:27.16	19	Did not advance			
Medi Harris	100 m backstroke	1:00.11	12 Q	59.62	8 Q	59.84	7
Anna Hopkin	50 m freestyle	24.61	6 Q	24.73	13	Did not advance	
Emily Large	200 m butterfly	2:08.93	7 Q	2:08.66	10	Did not advance	
Keanna MacInnes	100 m butterfly	59.30	20	Did not advance			
Katie Shanahan	200 m backstroke	2:09.18	4 Q	2:08.32	4 Q	2:07.45	4
Katie Shanahan	200 m individual medley	2:11.26	12 Q	Disqualified		Did not advance	
Katie Shanahan	400 m individual medley	4:39.46	8 Q	—		4:41.29	7
Laura Stephens	200 m butterfly	2:08.07	4 Q	2:07.47	6 Q	2:07.27	7
Abbie Wood	200 m freestyle	1:58.39	18	Did not advance			
Anna Hopkin; Lucy Hope; Abbie Wood; Freya Anderson	4 × 100 m freestyle relay	3:35.98	4 Q	—		3:33.90 NR	4
Freya Colbert; Lucy Hope; Abbie Wood; Freya Anderson; Medi Harris	4 × 200 m freestyle relay	7:51.13	3 Q	—		7:46.63	4
Lauren Cox; Kara Hanlon; Laura Stephens; Anna Hopkin	4 × 100 m medley relay	3:58.95	9	—		Did not advance	

Mixed

Athlete	Event	Heat		Final	
Athlete	Event	Time	Rank	Time	Rank
Matt Richards; Duncan Scott; Anna Hopkin; Freya Anderson; Jacob Whittle; Tom Dean; Lucy Hope	4 × 100 m freestyle relay	3:24.41	4 Q	3:21.68 ER	3rd place, bronze medalist(s)
Medi Harris; James Wilby; Jacob Peters; Anna Hopkin	4 × 100 m medley relay	3:43.47	5 Q	3:43.20	5
