= Venezuela at the 2023 World Aquatics Championships =

- Flag of Venezuela
- FINA code: VEN
- National federation: Venezuelan Water Sports Federation
- Website: feveda.org.ve (in Spanish)

in Fukuoka, Japan
- Competitors: 12 in 3 sports
- Medals: Gold 0 Silver 0 Bronze 0 Total 0

World Aquatics Championships appearances
- 1973; 1975; 1978; 1982; 1986; 1991; 1994; 1998; 2001; 2003; 2005; 2007; 2009; 2011; 2013; 2015; 2017; 2019; 2022; 2023; 2024

Venezuela is set to compete at the 2023 World Aquatics Championships in Fukuoka, Japan from 14 to 30 July.

== Diving ==
Venezuela entered 2 divers.

Men

Athlete	Event	Preliminaries		Semifinals		Final	
Athlete	Event	Points	Rank	Points	Rank	Points	Rank
Jesús González	1 m springboard	290.50	36	—		Did not advance	
Jesús González	3 m springboard	305.45	47	Did not advance			
Jesús González	10 m platform	Did not start					

Women

Athlete	Event	Preliminaries		Semifinals		Final	
Athlete	Event	Points	Rank	Points	Rank	Points	Rank
Elizabeth Pérez	1 m springboard	213.10	32	—		Did not advance	
Elizabeth Pérez	3 m springboard	233.90	32	Did not advance			

Mixed

Athlete	Event	Final	
Athlete	Event	Points	Rank
Jesús González; Elizabeth Pérez	3 m synchro springboard	248.10	11

== Open water swimming ==
Venezuela entered 3 open water swimmers.

Men

Athlete	Event	Time	Rank
Johndry Segovia	Men's 5 km	56:57.4	27
Johndry Segovia	Men's 10 km	2:00:20.5	40
Diego Vera	Men's 5 km	59:41.9	42
Diego Vera	Men's 10 km	2:05:47.8	57

Women

Athlete	Event	Time	Rank
Paola Pérez	Women's 10 km	2:07:11.7	31

== Swimming ==
Venezuela entered 7 swimmers.

Men

Athlete	Event	Heat		Semifinal		Final	
Athlete	Event	Time	Rank	Time	Rank	Time	Rank
Alberto Mestre	50 metre freestyle	22.32	33	Did not advance			
Alberto Mestre	100 metre freestyle	49.80	42	Did not advance			
Alfonso Mestre	200 metre freestyle	1:47.36	26	Did not advance			
Alfonso Mestre	400 metre freestyle	3:46.61	11	—		Did not advance	
Alfonso Mestre	800 metre freestyle	7:48.66 NR	16	—		Did not advance	
Alfonso Mestre	1500 metre freestyle	15:14.10 NR	22	—		Did not advance	
Emil Pérez	50 metre butterfly	25.22	59	Did not advance			
Jorge Otaiza	100 metre butterfly	53.44	39	Did not advance			
Jorge Otaiza	200 metre butterfly	2:01.83	28	Did not advance			
Alberto Mestre; Emil Pérez; Jorge Otaiza; Alfonso Mestre	4 × 100 m freestyle relay	3:25.11	19	—		Did not advance	

Women

Athlete	Event	Heat		Semifinal		Final	
Athlete	Event	Time	Rank	Time	Rank	Time	Rank
Lismar Lyon	50 metre freestyle	26.27	45	Did not advance			
Lismar Lyon	50 metre butterfly	27.53	34	Did not advance			
Mercedes Toledo	50 metre breaststroke	32.00	32	Did not advance			
Mercedes Toledo	100 metre breaststroke	1:10.37	38	Did not advance			
María Yegres	200 metre freestyle	2:00.82	31	Did not advance			
María Yegres	400 metre freestyle	4:15.79	29	—		Did not advance	
