= Hungary at the 2023 World Aquatics Championships =

- Flag of Hungary
- FINA code: HUN
- National federation: Hungarian Swimming Association
- Website: www.musz.hu (in Hungarian)

in Fukuoka, Japan
- Competitors: 61 in 5 sports
- Medals Ranked 11th: Gold 2 Silver 2 Bronze 0 Total 4

World Aquatics Championships appearances (overview)
- 1973; 1975; 1978; 1982; 1986; 1991; 1994; 1998; 2001; 2003; 2005; 2007; 2009; 2011; 2013; 2015; 2017; 2019; 2022; 2023; 2024

Hungary is set to compete at the 2023 World Aquatics Championships in Fukuoka, Japan from 14 to 30 July.

== Medalists ==
Medal	Name	Sport	Event	Date
1st place, gold medalist(s)	Hubert Kós	Swimming	Men's 200 m backstroke	28 July 2023
1st place, gold medalist(s)	Hungary men's national water polo team: Márton Lévai Dániel Angyal Krisztián Manhercz Zoltán Pohl Márton Vámos Ádám Nagy Gergő Zalánki; Gergő Fekete Toni Német Dénes Varga Szilárd Jansik Vendel Vigvári Soma Vogel	Water polo	Men's tournament	29 July 2023
2nd place, silver medalist(s)	Kristóf Rasovszky	Open water swimming	Men's 10 km	16 July 2023
2nd place, silver medalist(s)	Bettina Fábián; Anna Olasz; Kristóf Rasovszky; Dávid Betlehem	Open water swimming	Team	20 July 2023

== Athletes by discipline ==
The following is the list of number of competitors participating at the Championships per discipline.

Sport	Men	Women	Total
Artistic swimming	0	2	2
Diving	0	2	2
Open water swimming	2*	2*	4*
Swimming	12*	14*	26*
Water polo	15	15	30
Total	27	34	61

- Dávid Betlehem, Bettina Fábián and Kristóf Rasovszky was compete in both open water swimming and indoor swimming.

== Artistic swimming ==
Hungary entered 2 artistic swimmers.

Women

Athlete	Event	Preliminaries		Final	
Athlete	Event	Points	Rank	Points	Rank
Blanka Barbócz; Angelika Bastianelli	Duet technical routine	173.8016	27	did not advance	
Blanka Barbócz; Angelika Bastianelli	Duet free routine	135.5583	24	did not advance	

== Diving ==
Hungary entered 2 divers.

Women

Athlete	Event	Preliminaries		Semifinals		Final	
Athlete	Event	Points	Rank	Points	Rank	Points	Rank
Patricia Kun	1 m springboard	182.40	42	—		Did not advance	
Patricia Kun	3 m springboard	189.30	47	Did not advance			
Estilla Mosena	1 m springboard	186.90	41	—		Did not advance	
Estilla Mosena	3 m springboard	215.80	40	Did not advance			

== Open water swimming ==
Hungary entered 4 open water swimmers.

Men

Athlete	Event	Time	Rank
Dávid Betlehem	Men's 5 km	54:58.6	5
Dávid Betlehem	Men's 10 km	1:53:30.9	16
Kristóf Rasovszky	Men's 5 km	55:23.9	7
Kristóf Rasovszky	Men's 10 km	1:50:59.0	2nd place, silver medalist(s)

Women

Athlete	Event	Time	Rank
Bettina Fábián	Women's 5 km	59:44.2	8
Bettina Fábián	Women's 10 km	2:03:15.2	9
Anna Olasz	Women's 5 km	1:01:09.4	16
Anna Olasz	Women's 10 km	2:03:16.9	12

Mixed

Athlete	Event	Time	Rank
Bettina Fábián; Anna Olasz; Kristóf Rasovszky; Dávid Betlehem	Team relay	1:10:35.3	2nd place, silver medalist(s)

== Swimming ==
Hungary entered 26 swimmers. Kristóf Milák was originally named in the team, however withdraw for mental health reasons.

Men

Athlete	Event	Heat		Semifinal		Final	
Athlete	Event	Time	Rank	Time	Rank	Time	Rank
Dávid Betlehem	800 metre freestyle	7:47.02	12	—		Did not advance	
Dávid Betlehem	1500 metre freestyle	14:59.76	15	—		Did not advance	
Balázs Holló	400 metre individual medley	4:12.77	7 Q	—		4:15.17	8
Hubert Kós	100 metre backstroke	53.12 NR	2 Q	53.17	6 Q	53.11 NR	7
Hubert Kós	200 metre backstroke	1:57.27	3 Q	1:55.99	3 Q	1:54.14 NR	1st place, gold medalist(s)
Hubert Kós	100 metre butterfly	Did not start					
Hubert Kós	200 metre individual medley	Did not start					
Benedek Kovács	100 metre backstroke	54.24	21	Did not advance			
Benedek Kovács	200 metre backstroke	1:58.17	14 Q	1:55.89	2 Q	1:55.85	5
Richárd Márton	100 metre butterfly	52.31	=27	Did not advance			
Richárd Márton	200 metre butterfly	1:56.03	14 Q	1:54.54	6 Q	1:55.02	7
Nándor Németh	100 metre freestyle	48.21	=14 Q	47.62	4 Q	48.17	8
Nándor Németh	200 metre freestyle	1:47.11	23	Did not advance			
Kristóf Rasovszky	400 metre freestyle	3:46.56	10	—		Did not advance	
Kristóf Rasovszky	800 metre freestyle	7:47.93	15	—		Did not advance	
Kristóf Rasovszky	1500 metre freestyle	14:54.09	7 Q	—		14:51.46	6
Szebasztián Szabó	50 metre freestyle	21.67	2 Q	22.16	16	Did not advance	
Szebasztián Szabó	100 metre freestyle	48.36	17	Did not advance			
Szebasztián Szabó	50 metre butterfly	23.27	=9 Q	23.16	=10	Did not advance	
Áron Székely	50 metre backstroke	25.59	30	Did not advance			
Ádám Telegdy	200 metre individual medley	2:01.82	26	Did not advance			
Ádám Telegdy	400 metre individual medley	4:21.29	19	—		Did not advance	
Nándor Németh; Dániel Mészáros; Szebasztián Szabó; Hubert Kós	4 × 100 metre freestyle relay	3:14.42	11	—		Did not advance	
Nándor Németh; Richárd Márton; Balázs Holló; Kristóf Rasovszky	4 × 200 metre freestyle relay	7:11.57	15	—		Did not advance	

Women

Athlete	Event	Heat		Semifinal		Final	
Athlete	Event	Time	Rank	Time	Rank	Time	Rank
Katalin Burián	200 metre backstroke	2:11.94	16 Q	2:11.47	12	Did not advance	
Bettina Fábián	400 metre freestyle	4:12.83	23	—		Did not advance	
Bettina Fábián	800 metre freestyle	8:39.63	24	—		Did not advance	
Nóra Flück	1500 metre freestyle	16:34.63	22	—		Did not advance	
Zsuzsanna Jakabos	100 metre butterfly	1:01.51	30	Did not advance			
Zsuzsanna Jakabos	200 metre butterfly	2:10.73	14 Q	2:11.23	15	Did not advance	
Zsuzsanna Jakabos	400 metre individual medley	4:43.52	18	—		Did not advance	
Boglárka Kapás	200 metre butterfly	2:10.18	13 Q	2:09.56	13	Did not advance	
Ajna Késely	200 metre freestyle	1:58.99	21	Did not advance			
Ajna Késely	400 metre freestyle	4:07.08	9	—		Did not advance	
Ajna Késely	800 metre freestyle	8:28.23	10	—		Did not advance	
Lora Komoróczy	50 metre backstroke	28.29	17	Did not advance			
Viktória Mihályvári-Farkas	1500 metre freestyle	16:25.16	19	—		Did not advance	
Viktória Mihályvári-Farkas	400 metre individual medley	4:41.28	10	—		Did not advance	
Dóra Molnár	100 metre backstroke	1:02.62	34	Did not advance			
Nikolett Pádár	200 metre freestyle	1:57.35	8 Q	1:56.55	10	Did not advance	
Dalma Sebestyén	200 metre individual medley	2:13.32	19	Did not advance			
Petra Senánszky	50 metre freestyle	25.04	17	Did not advance			
Petra Senánszky	100 metre freestyle	DNS					
Eszter Szabó-Feltóthy	200 metre backstroke	2:10.38	9 Q	2:09.90	9	Did not advance	
Petra Senánszky; Dóra Molnár; Lilla Minna Ábrahám; Nikolett Pádár	4 × 100 metre freestyle relay	3:40.02	13	—		Did not advance	
Lilla Ábrahám; Nikolett Pádár; Ajna Késely; Dóra Molnár	4 × 200 metre freestyle relay	7:55.26	7 Q	—		7:54.65	7

Mixed

Athlete	Event	Heat		Final	
Athlete	Event	Time	Rank	Time	Rank
Áron Székely; Dalma Sebestyén; Lora Komoróczy; Dániel Mészáros	4 × 100 m medley relay	3:56.82	21	Did not advance	

== Water polo ==
Summary

Team	Event	Group stage				Playoff	Quarterfinal	Semifinal	Final / BM	
Team	Event	Opposition Score	Opposition Score	Opposition Score	Rank	Opposition Score	Opposition Score	Opposition Score	Opposition Score	Rank
Hungary	Men's tournament	Japan; W 16–8	Croatia; W 12–10	Argentina; W 21–13	1 Q	—	United States; W 13–12	Spain; W 12–11	Greece; W 14–13	1st place, gold medalist(s)
Hungary	Women's tournament	Canada; W 11–10	Japan; W 26–21	New Zealand; W 23–5	1 Q	—	Spain; L 9–12	Greece; W 10–9	United States; L 13–15	6

=== Men's tournament ===
Team roster

The following is the Hungarian roster.

Head coach: Zsolt Varga

- 1 Márton Lévai GK
- 2 Dániel Angyal FP
- 3 Krisztián Manhercz FP
- 4 Zoltán Pohl FP
- 5 Márton Vámos FP
- 6 Ádám Nagy FP
- 7 Gergő Zalánki FP
- 8 Gergő Fekete FP
- 9 Toni Német FP
- 10 Dénes Varga FP
- 11 Szilárd Jansik FP
- 12 Vendel Vigvári FP
- 13 Soma Vogel GK
- Erik Molnár FP
- Vince Vigvári FP

Group play

Pos	Team	Pld	W	PSW	PSL	L	GF	GA	GD	Pts	Qualification
1	Hungary	3	3	0	0	0	49	31	+18	9	Quarterfinals
2	Croatia	3	2	0	0	1	51	29	+22	6	Playoffs
3	Japan (H)	3	1	0	0	2	40	42	−2	3	Playoffs
4	Argentina	3	0	0	0	3	27	65	−38	0	

Source: Sportresult
Rules for classification: 1) points; 2) head-to-head points; 3) head-to-head goal difference; 4) head-to-head number of goals scored; 5) Goal difference.
(H) Host

17 July 2023; 19:00	Report	Hungary	16–8	Japan	Marine Messe Fukuoka, Fukuoka; Referees: Zhang Liang (CHN), Nicola Johnson (AUS)
17 July 2023; 19:00	Report	Score by quarters: 4–4, 3–2, 3–1, 6–1			Marine Messe Fukuoka, Fukuoka; Referees: Zhang Liang (CHN), Nicola Johnson (AUS)
17 July 2023; 19:00	Report	Jansik, Zalánki 4	Goals	Suzuki, Takata 2	Marine Messe Fukuoka, Fukuoka; Referees: Zhang Liang (CHN), Nicola Johnson (AUS)

19 July 2023; 12:00	Report	Croatia	10–12	Hungary	Marine Messe Fukuoka, Fukuoka; Referees: Adrian-Tiberiu Alexandrescu (ROU), Frank Ohme (GER)
19 July 2023; 12:00	Report	Score by quarters: 1–3, 2–2, 3–3, 4–4			Marine Messe Fukuoka, Fukuoka; Referees: Adrian-Tiberiu Alexandrescu (ROU), Frank Ohme (GER)
19 July 2023; 12:00	Report	three players 2	Goals	Zalánki 3	Marine Messe Fukuoka, Fukuoka; Referees: Adrian-Tiberiu Alexandrescu (ROU), Frank Ohme (GER)

21 July 2023; 09:00	Report	Hungary	21–13	Argentina	Marine Messe Fukuoka, Fukuoka; Referees: Zhang Liang (CHN), Alessia Ferrari (ITA)
21 July 2023; 09:00	Report	Score by quarters: 7–1, 5–4, 4–4, 5–4			Marine Messe Fukuoka, Fukuoka; Referees: Zhang Liang (CHN), Alessia Ferrari (ITA)
21 July 2023; 09:00	Report	Vigvári 4	Goals	Camnasio, Corsi 3	Marine Messe Fukuoka, Fukuoka; Referees: Zhang Liang (CHN), Alessia Ferrari (ITA)

Quarterfinals

25 July 2023; 18:00	Report	Hungary	13–12	United States	Marine Messe Fukuoka, Fukuoka; Referees: Adrian-Tiberiu Alexandrescu (ROU), Vojin Putniković (SRB)
25 July 2023; 18:00	Report	Score by quarters: 4–4, 3–1, 3–2, 3–5			Marine Messe Fukuoka, Fukuoka; Referees: Adrian-Tiberiu Alexandrescu (ROU), Vojin Putniković (SRB)
25 July 2023; 18:00	Report	Zalánki 6	Goals	Bowen 4	Marine Messe Fukuoka, Fukuoka; Referees: Adrian-Tiberiu Alexandrescu (ROU), Vojin Putniković (SRB)

Semifinals

27 July 2023; 18:30	Report	Hungary	12–11	Spain	Marine Messe Fukuoka, Fukuoka; Referees: Boris Margeta (SLO), Frank Ohme (GER)
27 July 2023; 18:30	Report	Score by quarters: 3–3, 1–3, 3–2, 5–3			Marine Messe Fukuoka, Fukuoka; Referees: Boris Margeta (SLO), Frank Ohme (GER)
27 July 2023; 18:30	Report	Manhercz 3	Goals	three players 2	Marine Messe Fukuoka, Fukuoka; Referees: Boris Margeta (SLO), Frank Ohme (GER)

Final

29 July 2023; 18:00	Report	Greece	13–14	Hungary	Marine Messe Fukuoka, Fukuoka; Referees: Michiel Zwartt (NED), Vojin Putniković (SRB)
29 July 2023; 18:00	Report	Score by quarters: 2–4, 2–1, 3–2, 3–3 PSO: 3–4			Marine Messe Fukuoka, Fukuoka; Referees: Michiel Zwartt (NED), Vojin Putniković (SRB)
29 July 2023; 18:00	Report	Genidounias 4	Goals	Manhercz, Zalánki 3	Marine Messe Fukuoka, Fukuoka; Referees: Michiel Zwartt (NED), Vojin Putniković (SRB)

=== Women's tournament ===
Team roster

The following is the Hungarian roster.

Head coach: Attila Bíró

- 1 Alda Magyari GK
- 2 Dorottya Szilágyi FP
- 3 Vanda Vályi FP
- 4 Gréta Gurisatti FP
- 5 Géraldine Mahieu FP
- 6 Rebecca Parkes FP
- 7 Zsuzsanna Máté FP
- 8 Rita Keszthelyi FP
- 9 Dóra Leimeter FP
- 10 Natasa Rybanska FP
- 11 Kamilla Faragó FP
- 12 Krisztina Garda FP
- 13 Boglárka Neszmély GK
- Kata Hajdu FP
- Dalma Dömsödi FP

Group play

Pos	Team	Pld	W	PSW	PSL	L	GF	GA	GD	Pts	Qualification
1	Hungary	3	3	0	0	0	60	36	+24	9	Quarterfinals
2	Canada	3	2	0	0	1	40	34	+6	6	Playoffs
3	New Zealand	3	1	0	0	2	33	52	−19	3	Playoffs
4	Japan (H)	3	0	0	0	3	49	60	−11	0	

Source: Sportresult
Rules for classification: 1) points; 2) head-to-head points; 3) head-to-head goal difference; 4) head-to-head number of goals scored; 5) Goal difference.
(H) Host

16 July 2023; 20:30	Report	Hungary	11–10	Canada	Marine Messe Fukuoka, Fukuoka; Referees: Marta Cabanas (ESP), Zhang Liang (CHN)
16 July 2023; 20:30	Report	Score by quarters: 5–3, 2–2, 1–2, 3–3			Marine Messe Fukuoka, Fukuoka; Referees: Marta Cabanas (ESP), Zhang Liang (CHN)
16 July 2023; 20:30	Report	Keszthelyi 4	Goals	four players 2	Marine Messe Fukuoka, Fukuoka; Referees: Marta Cabanas (ESP), Zhang Liang (CHN)

18 July 2023; 19:00	Report	Japan	21–26	Hungary	Marine Messe Fukuoka, Fukuoka; Referees: Matan Schwartz (ISR), Frank Ohme (GER)
18 July 2023; 19:00	Report	Score by quarters: 4–5, 6–8, 5–7, 6–6			Marine Messe Fukuoka, Fukuoka; Referees: Matan Schwartz (ISR), Frank Ohme (GER)
18 July 2023; 19:00	Report	Arima 7	Goals	Hajdú 5	Marine Messe Fukuoka, Fukuoka; Referees: Matan Schwartz (ISR), Frank Ohme (GER)

20 July 2023; 12:00	Report	New Zealand	5–23	Hungary	Marine Messe Fukuoka, Fukuoka; Referees: Veselin Mišković (MNE), Marta Cabanas (ESP),
20 July 2023; 12:00	Report	Score by quarters: 3–6, 0–3, 2–9, 0–5			Marine Messe Fukuoka, Fukuoka; Referees: Veselin Mišković (MNE), Marta Cabanas (ESP),
20 July 2023; 12:00	Report	Doyle, Houghton 2	Goals	Szilágyi 5	Marine Messe Fukuoka, Fukuoka; Referees: Veselin Mišković (MNE), Marta Cabanas (ESP),

Quarterfinals

24 July 2023; 19:30	Report	Hungary	9–12	Spain	Marine Messe Fukuoka, Fukuoka; Referees: Alessia Ferrari (ITA), Nenad Peris (CRO)
24 July 2023; 19:30	Report	Score by quarters: 2–3, 2–3, 3–4, 2–2			Marine Messe Fukuoka, Fukuoka; Referees: Alessia Ferrari (ITA), Nenad Peris (CRO)
24 July 2023; 19:30	Report	Garda 4	Goals	Forca 5	Marine Messe Fukuoka, Fukuoka; Referees: Alessia Ferrari (ITA), Nenad Peris (CRO)

5–8th place semifinals

26 July 2023; 15:30	Report	Greece	9–10	Hungary	Marine Messe Fukuoka, Fukuoka; Referees: Matan Schwartz (ISR), Zhang Liang (CHN)
26 July 2023; 15:30	Report	Score by quarters: 1–2, 2–2, 4–5, 2–1			Marine Messe Fukuoka, Fukuoka; Referees: Matan Schwartz (ISR), Zhang Liang (CHN)
26 July 2023; 15:30	Report	Ninou 3	Goals	Garda, Keszthelyi 3	Marine Messe Fukuoka, Fukuoka; Referees: Matan Schwartz (ISR), Zhang Liang (CHN)

Fifth place game

28 July 2023; 16:30	Report	United States	15–13	Hungary	Marine Messe Fukuoka, Fukuoka; Referees: Zhang Liang (CHN), Marta Cabanas (ESP)
28 July 2023; 16:30	Report	Score by quarters: 4–2, 1–3, 5–4, 1–2 PSO: 4–2			Marine Messe Fukuoka, Fukuoka; Referees: Zhang Liang (CHN), Marta Cabanas (ESP)
28 July 2023; 16:30	Report	Raney 3	Goals	Keszthelyi 4	Marine Messe Fukuoka, Fukuoka; Referees: Zhang Liang (CHN), Marta Cabanas (ESP)
