= Swimming at the 2023 World Aquatics Championships – Women's 100 metre freestyle =

Women's 100 metre freestyle at the 2023 World Aquatics Championships
- Venue: Marine Messe Fukuoka
- Location: Fukuoka, Japan
- Dates: 27 July (heats and semifinals); 28 July (final)
- Competitors: 79 from 74 nations
- Winning time: 52.16

Medalists
gold medal	Mollie O'Callaghan	Australia
silver medal	Siobhán Haughey	Hong Kong
bronze medal	Marrit Steenbergen	Netherlands

The women's 100 metre freestyle competition at the 2023 World Aquatics Championships was held on 27 and 28 July 2023.

== Records ==
Prior to the competition, the existing world and championship records were as follows.

World record	Sarah Sjöström (SWE)	51.71	Budapest, Hungary	23 July 2017
Competition record	Sarah Sjöström (SWE)	51.71	Budapest, Hungary	23 July 2017

== Results ==
=== Heats ===
The heats were started on 27 July at 10:32.

Rank	Heat	Lane	Name	Nationality	Time	Notes
1	7	4	Siobhán Haughey	Hong Kong	53.15	Q
2	8	5	Abbey Weitzeil	United States	53.25	Q
3	6	4	Emma McKeon	Australia	53.40	Q
4	7	3	Marie Wattel	France	53.59	Q
5	6	2	Michelle Coleman	Sweden	53.72	Q
6	6	5	Marrit Steenbergen	Netherlands	53.82	Q
7	8	4	Mollie O'Callaghan	Australia	54.01	Q
8	8	3	Cheng Yujie	China	54.11	Q
9	6	6	Stephanie Balduccini	Brazil	54.15	Q
10	6	3	Beryl Gastaldello	France	54.16	Q
11	8	5	Kate Douglass	United States	54.41	Q
12	8	6	Yang Junxuan	China	54.45	Q
13	7	8	Sofia Morini	Italy	54.50	Q
14	6	1	Aimee Canny	South Africa	54.60	Q
15	8	2	Signe Bro	Denmark	54.61	Q
16	7	6	Rikako Ikee	Japan	54.67	Q
17	6	8	Snæfríður Jórunnardóttir	Iceland	54.74	NR
17	7	2	Kalia Antoniou	Cyprus	54.74	
19	6	7	Kornelia Fiedkiewicz	Poland	54.82	
20	8	8	Hur Yeon-kyung	South Korea	54.97	
21	7	1	Barbora Seemanová	Czech Republic	55.04	
22	8	7	Janja Šegel	Slovenia	55.17	
23	5	5	Jillian Crooks	Cayman Islands	55.32	NR
24	6	0	Elisbet Gámez	Cuba	55.40	
25	7	0	Carmen Weiler Sastre	Spain	55.46	
26	8	0	Victoria Catterson	Ireland	55.56	
27	5	3	Anicka Delgado	Ecuador	55.57	
28	8	1	Roos Vanotterdijk	Belgium	55.89	
29	8	9	Chelsey Edwards	New Zealand	56.04	
30	5	4	Teresa Ivan	Slovakia	56.16	
31	6	9	Quah Ting Wen	Singapore	56.52	
32	7	9	Nina Kost	Switzerland	56.60	
33	5	2	Inés Marín	Chile	56.90	NR
34	4	5	Elisabeth Timmer	Aruba	57.86	
35	5	6	Maddy Moore	Bermuda	58.01	
36	5	7	Mia Blaževska Eminova	North Macedonia	58.05	
37	5	9	Ani Poghosyan	Armenia	58.80	
38	4	2	Zaylie Thompson	Bahamas	58.86	
39	1	9	Maria Brunlehner	Suspended Member Federation	59.00	
40	5	1	Maxine Egner	Botswana	59.02	
41	4	3	Adriana Giles	Bolivia	59.17	
42	4	4	Mya Azzopardi	Malta	59.27	
43	5	8	Sabrina Lyn	Jamaica	59.38	
44	4	7	Kirabo Namutebi	Uganda	59.50	
45	4	8	Tilly Collymore	Grenada	59.85	
46	4	1	Paige van der Westhuizen	Zimbabwe	1:00.12	
47	4	6	Mariel Mencia	Dominican Republic	1:00.13	
48	5	0	Isabella Alas	El Salvador	1:00.58	
49	4	0	Aleka Persaud	Guyana	1:00.67	NR
50	3	2	Aunjelique Liddie	Antigua and Barbuda	1:01.07	
51	3	3	Georgia-Leigh Vele	Papua New Guinea	1:01.17	
52	1	0	Asma Lefalher	Bahrain	1:01.18	
53	4	9	Jehanara Nabi	Pakistan	1:01.39	NR
54	3	4	Mariam Mithqal	Jordan	1:01.69	
54	3	8	Mia Lee	Guam	1:01.69	
56	3	5	Dorcas Abeng	Nigeria	1:01.81	
57	1	1	Katie Rock	Albania	1:01.89	
58	3	0	Makelyta Singsombath	Laos	1:01.90	
59	3	9	Duana Lama	Nepal	1:01.93	
60	3	6	Kaiya Brown	Samoa	1:02.01	
61	1	8	Mya de Freitas	Saint Vincent and the Grenadines	1:02.19	
62	3	7	Jovana Kuljaca	Montenegro	1:02.31	
63	1	4	Hayley Wong	Brunei	1:03.48	
64	2	4	Charissa Panuve	Tonga	1:03.51	
65	3	1	Anastasiya Morginshtern	Turkmenistan	1:03.86	
66	1	7	Sophia Latiff	Tanzania	1:04.47	
67	2	5	Saba Sultan	Kuwait	1:05.49	
68	2	3	Tayamika Chang'Anamuno	Malawi	1:06.58	
69	1	6	Mashael Al-Ayed	Saudi Arabia	1:07.66	
70	2	1	Simanga Dlamini	Eswatini	1:07.78	
71	2	7	Rana Saadeldin	Sudan	1:08.38	
72	1	3	Kayla Hepler	Marshall Islands	1:09.01	
73	2	9	Loane Russet	Vanuatu	1:10.17	
74	2	2	Yuri Hosei	Palau	1:10.20	
75	2	6	Iman Kouraogo	Burkina Faso	1:10.65	
76	1	5	Alia Ishimwe	Burundi	1:13.45	
77	2	8	Imelda Ximenes	Timor-Leste	1:17.14	
	1	2	Mariama Sow	Guinea	Did not start	
	2	0	Abbi Illis	Sint Maarten	Did not start	
	7	7	Petra Senánszky	Hungary	Did not start	

==== Swim-off ====
The swim-off to determine the first reserve was held on 27 July at 12:05.

Rank	Lane	Name	Nationality	Time	Notes
1	4	Snæfríður Jórunnardóttir	Iceland	54.87	
2	5	Kalia Antoniou	Cyprus	55.07	

=== Semifinals ===
The semifinals were held on 27 July at 20:11.

Rank	Heat	Lane	Name	Nationality	Time	Notes
1	1	3	Marrit Steenbergen	Netherlands	52.82	Q
2	2	6	Mollie O'Callaghan	Australia	52.86	Q
3	2	4	Siobhán Haughey	Hong Kong	52.90	Q
4	2	5	Emma McKeon	Australia	53.00	Q
5	1	4	Abbey Weitzeil	United States	53.36	Q
6	2	7	Kate Douglass	United States	53.38	Q
7	2	3	Michelle Coleman	Sweden	53.41	Q
8	1	7	Yang Junxuan	China	53.67	Q
9	1	5	Marie Wattel	France	53.83	
10	1	6	Cheng Yujie	China	53.92	
11	2	8	Signe Bro	Denmark	53.94	
12	1	2	Beryl Gastaldello	France	54.49	
13	2	2	Stephanie Balduccini	Brazil	54.69	
14	2	1	Sofia Morini	Italy	54.72	
15	1	8	Rikako Ikee	Japan	54.86	
16	1	1	Aimee Canny	South Africa	54.87	

=== Final ===
The final was started on 28 July at 20:02.

Rank	Lane	Name	Nationality	Time	Notes
1st place, gold medalist(s)	5	Mollie O'Callaghan	Australia	52.16	
2nd place, silver medalist(s)	3	Siobhán Haughey	Hong Kong	52.49	
3rd place, bronze medalist(s)	4	Marrit Steenbergen	Netherlands	52.71	
4	7	Kate Douglass	United States	52.81	
5	6	Emma McKeon	Australia	52.83	
6	2	Abbey Weitzeil	United States	53.34	
7	1	Michelle Coleman	Sweden	53.83	
8	8	Yang Junxuan	China	54.09	
