= France at the 2023 World Aquatics Championships =

- Flag of France
- World Aquatics code: FRA
- National federation: French Swimming Federation
- Website: www.ffnatation.fr (in French)

in Fukuoka, Japan
- Competitors: 85 in 6 sports
- Medals Ranked 4th: Gold 4 Silver 0 Bronze 4 Total 8

World Aquatics Championships appearances
- 1973; 1975; 1978; 1982; 1986; 1991; 1994; 1998; 2001; 2003; 2005; 2007; 2009; 2011; 2013; 2015; 2017; 2019; 2022; 2023; 2024; 2025

France competed at the 2023 World Aquatics Championships in Fukuoka, Japan from 14 to 30 July.

== Medalists ==
Medal	Name	Sport	Event	Date
Gold	Léon Marchand	Swimming	Men's 400 m individual medley	July 23
Gold	Léon Marchand	Swimming	Men's 200 m butterfly	July 26
Gold	Léon Marchand	Swimming	Men's 200 m individual medley	July 27
Gold	Maxime Grousset	Swimming	Men's 100 m butterfly	July 29
Bronze	Jules Bouyer; Alexis Jandard	Diving	Men's synchronized 3 m springboard	July 15
Bronze	Maxime Grousset	Swimming	Men's 50 m butterfly	July 24
Bronze	Gary Hunt	High diving	Men's high diving	July 27
Bronze	Maxime Grousset	Swimming	Men's 100 m freestyle	July 27

Medals by sport
Sport	1st place, gold medalist(s)	2nd place, silver medalist(s)	3rd place, bronze medalist(s)	Total
Diving	0	0	1	1
High diving	0	0	1	1
Swimming	4	0	2	5

== Athletes by discipline ==
The following is the list of number of competitors participating at the Championships per discipline.

Sport	Men	Women	Total
Artistic swimming	1	10	11
Diving	4*	4	8*
High diving	1*	1	2*
Open water swimming	3*	3	6*
Swimming	19*	13	32*
Water polo	15	15	30
Total	40	45	85

- David Aubry, Logan Fontaine and Anastasiya Kirpichnikova was compete in both open water swimming and indoor swimming. Gary Hunt was compete in both diving competitions.

== Artistic swimming ==
Men

Athlete	Event	Preliminaries		Final	
Athlete	Event	Points	Rank	Points	Rank
Quentin Rakotomalala	Solo technical routine	186.7233	4 Q	167.3266	8
Quentin Rakotomalala	Solo free routine	145.3501	7 Q	155.9813	6

Women

Athlete	Event	Preliminaries		Final	
Athlete	Event	Points	Rank	Points	Rank
Oriane Jaillardon	Solo technical routine	229.7233	4 Q	193.4234	10
Laelys Alavez	Solo free routine	150.4520	12 Q	175.8146	9
Anastasia Bayandina; Eve Planeix	Duet free routine	193.7375	8 Q	170.0542	12

Mixed

Athlete	Event	Preliminaries		Final	
Athlete	Event	Points	Rank	Points	Rank
Anastasia Bayandina; Romane Lunel; Ambre Esnault; Laura Tremble; Claudia Janvier; Mayssa Guermoud; Eve Planeix; Charlotte Tremble	Team acrobatic routine	212.8900	5 Q	210.6900	5
Romane Lunel; Laura Tremble; Ambre Esnault; Laelys Alavez; Charlotte Tremble; Eve Planeix; Mayssa Guermoud; Anastasia Bayandina	Team technical routine	208.6443	10 Q	248.1573	9

== Diving ==
France entered 7 divers.

Men

Athlete	Event	Preliminaries		Semifinals		Final	
Athlete	Event	Points	Rank	Points	Rank	Points	Rank
Jules Bouyer	1 m springboard	361.50	11 Q	—N/a		374.15	10
Jules Bouyer	3 m springboard	415.25	9 Q	389.05	17	Did not advance	
Alexis Jandard	1 m springboard	322.70	21	—N/a		Did not advance	
Alexis Jandard	3 m springboard	424.70	6 Q	390.40	16	Did not advance	
Jules Bouyer; Alexis Jandard	3 m synchro springboard	344.85	11 Q	—N/a		389.10	3rd place, bronze medalist(s)
Loïs Szymczak; Gary Hunt	10 m synchro platform	285.51	17	—N/a		Did not advance	

Women

Athlete	Event	Preliminaries		Semifinals		Final	
Athlete	Event	Points	Rank	Points	Rank	Points	Rank
Jade Gillet	10 m platform	247.50	26	Did not advance			
Naïs Gillet	1 m springboard	225.15	25	—N/a		Did not advance	
Naïs Gillet	3 m springboard	253.90	29	Did not advance			
Juliette Landi	3 m springboard	211.10	42	Did not advance			
Jade Gillet; Naïs Gillet	3 m synchro springboard	235.44	14	—N/a		Did not advance	
Jade Gillet; Emily Halifax	10 m synchro platform	240.24	10 Q	—N/a		236.16	10

== High diving ==
Athlete	Event	Points	Rank
Madeleine Bayon	Women's high diving	224.80	12
Gary Hunt	Men's high diving	426.30	3rd place, bronze medalist(s)

== Open water swimming ==
France entered 6 open water swimmers.

Men

Athlete	Event	Time	Rank
Logan Fontaine	Men's 5 km	55:33.0	9
Logan Fontaine	Men's 10 km	1:52:41.7	9
Sacha Velly	Men's 5 km	55:33.1	10
Sacha Velly	Men's 10 km	1:53:14.7	12

Women

Athlete	Event	Time	Rank
Océane Cassignol	Women's 10 km	2:03:25.5	16
Anastasiya Kirpichnikova	Women's 5 km	59:46.4	11
Anastasiya Kirpichnikova	Women's 10 km	2:03:17.6	13
Aurélie Muller	Women's 5 km	59:40.1	7

Mixed

Athlete	Event	Time	Rank
David Aubry; Logan Fontaine; Anastasiya Kirpichnikova; Aurélie Muller	Team relay	1:11:40.6	5

== Swimming ==
France entered 32 swimmers.

Men

Athlete	Event	Heat		Semifinal		Final	
Athlete	Event	Time	Rank	Time	Rank	Time	Rank
David Aubry	1500 m freestyle	14:54.29	8	—N/a		14:56.63	8
Pacome Bricout	800 m freestyle	7:55.20	20	—N/a		Did not advance	
Logan Fontaine	400 m freestyle	3:51.56	25	—N/a		Did not advance	
Roman Fuchs	200 m freestyle	1:48.13	29	Did not advance			
Maxime Grousset	50 m freestyle	Did not start					
Maxime Grousset	100 m freestyle	48.06	8 Q	47.87	7 Q	47.42	3rd place, bronze medalist(s)
Maxime Grousset	50 m butterfly	22.74 NR	1 Q	22.72 NR	1 Q	22.82	3rd place, bronze medalist(s)
Maxime Grousset	100 m butterfly	51.00	4 Q	50.62	2 Q	50.14 NR	1st place, gold medalist(s)
Antoine Herlem	200 m backstroke	1:58.20	15 Q	1:57.55	10	Did not advance	
Damien Joly	800 m freestyle	7:47.44	13	—N/a		Did not advance	
Damien Joly	1500 m freestyle	14:56.31	10	—N/a		Did not advance	
Antoine Marc	200 m breaststroke	2:10.51	11 Q	2:10.66	13	Did not advance	
Florent Manaudou	50 m freestyle	21.72	3 Q	21.96	12	Did not advance	
Léon Marchand	200 m breaststroke	Did not start					
Léon Marchand	200 m butterfly	1:55.46	7 Q	1:54.21	2 Q	1:52.43 NR	1st place, gold medalist(s)
Léon Marchand	200 m individual medley	1:58.38	9 Q	1:56.34	1 Q	1:54.82 ER	1st place, gold medalist(s)
Léon Marchand	400 m individual medley	4:10.88	2 Q	—N/a		4:02.50 WR	1st place, gold medalist(s)
Yohann Ndoye-Brouard	100 m backstroke	53.90	15 Q	53.06	5 Q	52.84	5
Hadrien Salvan	200 m freestyle	1:46.87	17	Did not advance			
Mewen Tomac	100 m backstroke	53.57	6 Q	52.86	4 Q	53.16	8
Mewen Tomac	200 m backstroke	1:58.09	12 Q	1:56.05	5 Q	1:55.79	4
Hadrien Salvan; Max Berg; Guillaume Guth; Florent Manaudou	4 × 100 m freestyle relay	3:14.54	12	—N/a		Did not advance	
Hadrien Salvan; Wissam-Amazigh Yebba; Enzo Tesic; Léon Marchand; Roman Fuchs	4 × 200 m freestyle relay	7:06.40	5 Q	—N/a		7:03.86	4
Yohann Ndoye-Brouard; Léon Marchand; Maxime Grousset; Hadrien Salvan; Mewen Tomac	4 × 100 m medley relay	3:31.61	2 Q	—N/a		3:29.88	4

Women

Athlete	Event	Heat		Semifinal		Final	
Athlete	Event	Time	Rank	Time	Rank	Time	Rank
Charlotte Bonnet	200 m breaststroke	2:27.47	20	Did not advance			
Charlotte Bonnet	200 m individual medley	2:13.28	17	Did not advance			
Cyrielle Duhamel	400 m freestyle	4:16.97	30	—N/a		Did not advance	
Cyrielle Duhamel	400 m individual medley	4:45.32	20	—N/a		Did not advance	
Béryl Gastaldello	100 m freestyle	54.16	10 Q	54.49	12	Did not advance	
Mélanie Henique	50 m freestyle	25.31	21	Did not advance			
Mélanie Henique	50 m butterfly	25.75	4 Q	25.70	4 Q	25.80	8
Anastasiya Kirpichnikova	400 m freestyle	4:09.43	14	—N/a		Did not advance	
Anastasiya Kirpichnikova	800 m freestyle	8:22.74	9	—N/a		Did not advance	
Anastasiya Kirpichnikova	1500 m freestyle	16:00.40	6 Q	—N/a		15:48.53 NR	4
Fantine Lesaffre	200 m individual medley	2:13.28	17	Did not advance			
Fantine Lesaffre	400 m individual medley	4:42.07	14	—N/a		Did not advance	
Pauline Mahieu	100 m backstroke	59.60	6 Q	59.30 NR	5	59.72	6
Mary-Ambre Moluh	50 m backstroke	27.69	5 Q	27.82	10	Did not advance	
Analia Pigrée	50 m backstroke	28.01	12 Q	27.70	6 Q	28.04	8
Analia Pigrée	100 m backstroke	1:01.67	30	Did not advance			
Emma Terebo	200 m backstroke	2:13.95	24	Did not advance			
Marie Wattel	50 m freestyle	24.84	14 Q	24.68; 24.62	8 S/off; 2	Did not advance	
Marie Wattel	100 m freestyle	53.59	4 Q	53.83	9	Did not advance	
Marie Wattel	100 m butterfly	58.02	11 Q	57.17	8 Q	57.13	6
Béryl Gastaldello; Lison Nowaczyk; Mary-Ambre Moluh; Assia Touati	4 × 100 m freestyle relay	3:38.52	10	—N/a		Did not advance	
Pauline Mahieu; Charlotte Bonnet; Marie Wattel; Lison Nowaczyk	4 × 100 m medley relay	3:58.54	7 Q	—N/a		3:59.24	8

Mixed

Athlete	Event	Heat		Final	
Athlete	Event	Time	Rank	Time	Rank
Max Berg; Guillaume Guth; Assia Touati; Lison Nowaczyk	4 × 100 m freestyle relay	3:27.62	10	Did not advance	
Pauline Mahieu; Clement Bidard; Stanislas Huille; Beryl Gastaldello	4 × 100 m medley relay	3:46.07	10	Did not advance	

== Water polo ==
Summary

Team	Event	Group stage				Playoff	Quarterfinal	Semifinal	Final / BM	
Team	Event	Opposition Score	Opposition Score	Opposition Score	Rank	Opposition Score	Opposition Score	Opposition Score	Opposition Score	Rank
France	Men's tournament	Italy; L 6–11	China; W 17–8	Canada; W 15–11	2 QP	Australia; W 11–8	Spain; L 6–7	United States; W 18–16	Italy; L 9–16	6
France	Women's tournament	Australia; L 8–10	China; W 12–11	United States; L 5–16	3 QP	Spain; L 9–16	—N/a	South Africa; W 20–6	Israel; W 11–7	9

=== Men's tournament ===
Team roster

The following is the French roster.

Head coach: Florian Bruzzo

- 1 Clément Dubois GK
- 2 Rémi Saudadier FP
- 3 Ugo Crousillat FP
- 4 Alexandre Bouet FP
- 5 Enzo Khasz FP
- 6 Thomas Vernoux FP
- 7 Duje Živković FP
- 8 Emil Bjorch FP
- 9 Mehdi Marzouki FP
- 10 Charles Canonne FP
- 11 Pierre-Frédéric Vanpeperstraete FP
- 12 Andrea De Nardi FP
- 13 Hugo Fontani GK
- Mathias Bachelier FP
- Denis Do Carmo FP

Group play

Pos	Team	Pld	W	PSW	PSL	L	GF	GA	GD	Pts	Qualification
1	Italy	3	3	0	0	0	55	17	+38	9	Quarterfinals
2	France	3	2	0	0	1	38	32	+6	6	Playoffs
3	Canada	3	1	0	0	2	30	49	−19	3	Playoffs
4	China	3	0	0	0	3	23	48	−25	0	

Source: Sportresult
Rules for classification: 1) points; 2) head-to-head points; 3) head-to-head goal difference; 4) head-to-head number of goals scored; 5) Goal difference.

17 July 2023; 13:30	Report	France	6–13	Italy	Marine Messe Fukuoka, Fukuoka; Referees: Vojin Putniković (SRB), Michiel Zwartt (NED)
17 July 2023; 13:30	Report	Score by quarters: 3–2, 2–3, 0–3, 1–5			Marine Messe Fukuoka, Fukuoka; Referees: Vojin Putniković (SRB), Michiel Zwartt (NED)
17 July 2023; 13:30	Report	Crousillat, Khasz 2	Goals	Fondelli 4	Marine Messe Fukuoka, Fukuoka; Referees: Vojin Putniković (SRB), Michiel Zwartt (NED)

19 July 2023; 10:30	Report	China	8–17	France	Marine Messe Fukuoka, Fukuoka; Referees: Michiel Zwartt (NED), Veselin Mišković (MNE)
19 July 2023; 10:30	Report	Score by quarters: 1–4, 4–6, 0–4, 3–3			Marine Messe Fukuoka, Fukuoka; Referees: Michiel Zwartt (NED), Veselin Mišković (MNE)
19 July 2023; 10:30	Report	Chen R., Xie 2	Goals	Marzouki 4	Marine Messe Fukuoka, Fukuoka; Referees: Michiel Zwartt (NED), Veselin Mišković (MNE)

21 July 2023; 20:30	Report	France	15–11	Canada	Marine Messe Fukuoka, Fukuoka; Referees: Nenad Peris (CRO), Vojin Putniković (SRB)
21 July 2023; 20:30	Report	Score by quarters: 5–4, 5–3, 3–2, 2–2			Marine Messe Fukuoka, Fukuoka; Referees: Nenad Peris (CRO), Vojin Putniković (SRB)
21 July 2023; 20:30	Report	three players 3	Goals	three players 3	Marine Messe Fukuoka, Fukuoka; Referees: Nenad Peris (CRO), Vojin Putniković (SRB)

Playoffs

23 July 2023; 15:30	Report	Australia	8–11	France	Marine Messe Fukuoka, Fukuoka; Referees: Adrian-Tiberiu Alexandrescu (ROU), Darren Spiritsanto (USA)
23 July 2023; 15:30	Report	Score by quarters: 0–4, 5–2, 2–4, 1–1			Marine Messe Fukuoka, Fukuoka; Referees: Adrian-Tiberiu Alexandrescu (ROU), Darren Spiritsanto (USA)
23 July 2023; 15:30	Report	Negus, Pavillard 2	Goals	Vernoux 4	Marine Messe Fukuoka, Fukuoka; Referees: Adrian-Tiberiu Alexandrescu (ROU), Darren Spiritsanto (USA)

Quarterfinals

25 July 2023; 19:30	Report	Spain	7–6	France	Marine Messe Fukuoka, Fukuoka; Referees: Georgios Stavridis (GRE), Raffaele Colombo (ITA)
25 July 2023; 19:30	Report	Score by quarters: 1–2, 1–2, 2–1, 3–1			Marine Messe Fukuoka, Fukuoka; Referees: Georgios Stavridis (GRE), Raffaele Colombo (ITA)
25 July 2023; 19:30	Report	Tahull 2	Goals	Bouet, Crousillat 2	Marine Messe Fukuoka, Fukuoka; Referees: Georgios Stavridis (GRE), Raffaele Colombo (ITA)

5–8th place semifinals

27 July 2023; 15:30	Report	United States	16–18 (PSO)	France	Marine Messe Fukuoka, Fukuoka; Referees: Michiel Zwartt (NED), David Gómez (ESP)
27 July 2023; 15:30	Report	Score by quarters: 3–1, 3–3, 5–4, 2–5 PSO: 3–5			Marine Messe Fukuoka, Fukuoka; Referees: Michiel Zwartt (NED), David Gómez (ESP)
27 July 2023; 15:30	Report	Bowen 5	Goals	Crousillat, Vernoux 3	Marine Messe Fukuoka, Fukuoka; Referees: Michiel Zwartt (NED), David Gómez (ESP)

Fifth place game

29 July 2023; 16:30	Report	Italy	16–9	France	Marine Messe Fukuoka, Fukuoka; Referees: Tamás Kovács-Csatlós (HUN), Veselin Mišković (MNE)
29 July 2023; 16:30	Report	Score by quarters: 1–2, 3–2, 7–3, 5–2			Marine Messe Fukuoka, Fukuoka; Referees: Tamás Kovács-Csatlós (HUN), Veselin Mišković (MNE)
29 July 2023; 16:30	Report	Di Fulvio 5	Goals	Crousillat 3	Marine Messe Fukuoka, Fukuoka; Referees: Tamás Kovács-Csatlós (HUN), Veselin Mišković (MNE)

=== Women's tournament ===
Team roster

The following is the French roster.

Head coach: Theodoros Lorantos

- 1 Mia Rycraw GK
- 2 Estelle Millot FP
- 3 Valentine Heurtaux FP
- 4 Camelia Bouloukbachi FP
- 5 Louise Guillet FP
- 6 Orsolya Hertzka FP
- 7 Juliette Dhalluin FP
- 8 Aurélie Battu FP
- 9 Erica Hardy FP
- 10 Camille Radosavljevic FP
- 11 Tiziana Raspo FP
- 12 Audrey Daulé FP
- 13 Pasiphaé Martineaud-Peret GK
- Lara Andres FP
- Ema Vernoux FP

Group play

Pos	Team	Pld	W	PSW	PSL	L	GF	GA	GD	Pts	Qualification
1	United States	3	3	0	0	0	40	16	+24	9	Quarterfinals
2	Australia	3	2	0	0	1	26	24	+2	6	Playoffs
3	France	3	1	0	0	2	25	37	−12	3	Playoffs
4	China	3	0	0	0	3	24	38	−14	0	

Source: Sportresult
Rules for classification: 1) points; 2) head-to-head points; 3) head-to-head goal difference; 4) head-to-head number of goals scored; 5) Goal difference.

16 July 2023; 10:30	Report	France	8–10	Australia	Marine Messe Fukuoka, Fukuoka; Referees: Hélène Painchaud (CAN), Germán Moller (ARG)
16 July 2023; 10:30	Report	Score by quarters: 3–3, 2–4, 2–1, 1–2			Marine Messe Fukuoka, Fukuoka; Referees: Hélène Painchaud (CAN), Germán Moller (ARG)
16 July 2023; 10:30	Report	Bouloukbachi 3	Goals	Andrews, Fasala 2	Marine Messe Fukuoka, Fukuoka; Referees: Hélène Painchaud (CAN), Germán Moller (ARG)

18 July 2023; 20:30	Report	China	11–12	France	Marine Messe Fukuoka, Fukuoka; Referees: Tamás Kovács-Csatlós (HUN), Alessia Ferrari (ITA)
18 July 2023; 20:30	Report	Score by quarters: 4–3, 1–3, 4–1, 2–5			Marine Messe Fukuoka, Fukuoka; Referees: Tamás Kovács-Csatlós (HUN), Alessia Ferrari (ITA)
18 July 2023; 20:30	Report	Wang H. 3	Goals	Dhalluin 4	Marine Messe Fukuoka, Fukuoka; Referees: Tamás Kovács-Csatlós (HUN), Alessia Ferrari (ITA)

20 July 2023; 16:00	Report	France	5–16	United States	Marine Messe Fukuoka, Fukuoka; Referees: Chisato Kurosaki (JPN), Alessia Ferrari (ITA)
20 July 2023; 16:00	Report	Score by quarters: 1–5, 1–2, 0–4, 3–5			Marine Messe Fukuoka, Fukuoka; Referees: Chisato Kurosaki (JPN), Alessia Ferrari (ITA)
20 July 2023; 16:00	Report	Bouloukbachi 2	Goals	Prentice 4	Marine Messe Fukuoka, Fukuoka; Referees: Chisato Kurosaki (JPN), Alessia Ferrari (ITA)

Playoffs

22 July 2023; 15:30	Report	France	9–16	Spain	Marine Messe Fukuoka, Fukuoka; Referees: Matan Schwartz (ISR), Raffaele Colombo (ITA)
22 July 2023; 15:30	Report	Score by quarters: 1–3, 4–4, 2–5, 2–4			Marine Messe Fukuoka, Fukuoka; Referees: Matan Schwartz (ISR), Raffaele Colombo (ITA)
22 July 2023; 15:30	Report	Bouloukbachi, Dhalluin 2	Goals	Forca 5	Marine Messe Fukuoka, Fukuoka; Referees: Matan Schwartz (ISR), Raffaele Colombo (ITA)

9–12th place semifinals

24 July 2023; 13:30	Report	France	20–6	South Africa	Marine Messe Fukuoka, Fukuoka; Referees: Hélène Painchaud (CAN), Germán Moller (ARG)
24 July 2023; 13:30	Report	Score by quarters: 4–1, 6–0, 5–4, 5–1			Marine Messe Fukuoka, Fukuoka; Referees: Hélène Painchaud (CAN), Germán Moller (ARG)
24 July 2023; 13:30	Report	Vernoux 6	Goals	Thornton-Dibb 3	Marine Messe Fukuoka, Fukuoka; Referees: Hélène Painchaud (CAN), Germán Moller (ARG)

Ninth place game

26 July 2023; 10:30	Report	Israel	7–11	France	Marine Messe Fukuoka, Fukuoka; Referees: Nicola Johnson (AUS), Natalia Markopoulou (GRE)
26 July 2023; 10:30	Report	Score by quarters: 2–3, 1–4, 1–4, 3–0			Marine Messe Fukuoka, Fukuoka; Referees: Nicola Johnson (AUS), Natalia Markopoulou (GRE)
26 July 2023; 10:30	Report	Bogachenko 4	Goals	Millot 3	Marine Messe Fukuoka, Fukuoka; Referees: Nicola Johnson (AUS), Natalia Markopoulou (GRE)
