= Swimming at the 2023 World Aquatics Championships – Men's 200 metre freestyle =

Men's 200 metre freestyle at the 2023 World Aquatics Championships
- Venue: Marine Messe Fukuoka
- Location: Fukuoka, Japan
- Dates: 24 July (heats and semifinals); 25 July (final)
- Competitors: 72 from 64 nations
- Winning time: 1:44.30

Medalists
gold medal	Matt Richards	Great Britain
silver medal	Tom Dean	Great Britain
bronze medal	Hwang Sun-woo	South Korea

The men's 200 metre freestyle competition at the 2023 World Aquatics Championships was held on 24 and 25 July 2023.

== Records ==
Prior to the competition, the existing world and championship records were as follows.

World record	Paul Biedermann (GER)	1:42.00	Rome, Italy	28 July 2009
Competition record	Paul Biedermann (GER)	1:42.00	Rome, Italy	28 July 2009

== Results ==
=== Heats ===
The heats were started on 24 July at 11:27.

Rank	Heat	Lane	Name	Nationality	Time	Notes
1	7	3	Luke Hobson	United States	1:45.69	Q
2	8	5	Matt Richards	Great Britain	1:45.82	Q
3	8	4	David Popovici	Romania	1:45.86	Q
4	7	5	Tom Dean	Great Britain	1:46.02	Q
5	7	2	Lee Ho-joon	South Korea	1:46.21	Q
6	6	3	Kieran Smith	United States	1:46.38	Q
7	7	1	Lucas Henveaux	Belgium	1:46.40	Q
8	6	5	Katsuhiro Matsumoto	Japan	1:46.44	Q
9	6	6	Fernando Scheffer	Brazil	1:46.45	Q
10	8	3	Felix Auböck	Austria	1:46.48	Q
11	6	4	Pan Zhanle	China	1:46.49	Q
12	6	8	Alexander Graham	Australia	1:46.58	Q
13	6	2	Marco De Tullio	Italy	1:46.69	Q
13	7	4	Hwang Sun-woo	South Korea	1:46.69	Q
13	8	7	Rafael Miroslaw	Germany	1:46.69	Q
16	8	6	Antonio Djakovic	Switzerland	1:46.70	Q
17	8	2	Danas Rapšys	Lithuania	1:46.87	
17	8	8	Hadrien Salvan	France	1:46.87	
19	6	0	Jorge Iga	Mexico	1:46.89	
20	6	7	Kai Taylor	Australia	1:46.94	
21	7	7	Denis Loktev	Israel	1:47.08	
22	8	9	Robin Hanson	Sweden	1:47.09	
23	8	1	Nándor Németh	Hungary	1:47.11	
24	6	1	Stefano di Cola	Italy	1:47.27	
25	5	3	Kamil Sieradzki	Poland	1:47.34	
26	5	6	Alfonso Mestre	Venezuela	1:47.36	
27	5	5	Velimir Stjepanović	Serbia	1:47.93	
28	7	9	Kregor Zirk	Estonia	1:48.00	
29	8	0	Roman Fuchs	France	1:48.13	
30	5	4	Khiew Hoe Yean	Malaysia	1:48.18	
31	7	0	Dimitrios Markos	Greece	1:48.84	
32	7	8	Hong Jinquan	China	1:48.93	
33	5	1	Glen Lim Jun Wei	Singapore	1:49.13	
34	6	9	Luis Domínguez	Spain	1:49.28	
35	5	2	Jovan Lekić	Bosnia and Herzegovina	1:49.54	
36	4	5	Joaquín Vargas	Peru	1:49.85	
37	4	1	František Jablčník	Slovakia	1:50.61	
38	4	3	Santiago Corredor	Colombia	1:50.68	
39	4	2	Pit Brandenburger	Luxembourg	1:51.27	
39	4	4	Wesley Roberts	Cook Islands	1:51.27	
41	5	7	Zac Reid	New Zealand	1:51.66	
42	4	8	Omar Abbass	Syria	1:52.11	
43	5	8	Dulyawat Kaewsriyong	Thailand	1:52.24	
44	4	6	Righardt Muller	South Africa	1:52.25	
45	3	2	Loris Bianchi	San Marino	1:53.10	NR
46	5	0	Hoàng Quý Phước	Vietnam	1:53.67	
47	4	0	Pavel Alovatki	Moldova	1:54.19	
48	5	9	Baturalp Ünlü	Turkey	1:54.56	
49	3	4	Matheo Mateos	Paraguay	1:54.67	
50	3	3	Sauod Alshamroukh	Kuwait	1:54.77	
51	4	9	Alberto Vega	Costa Rica	1:55.07	
52	3	6	Henrique Mascarenhas	Angola	1:55.09	
53	3	0	Monyo Maina	Suspended Member Federation	1:55.28	
54	1	3	Artur Barseghyan	Armenia	1:55.69	
55	2	0	Lin Sizhuang	Macau	1:55.87	
56	3	1	Mauricio Arias	Dominican Republic	1:55.90	
57	4	7	Simon Doueihy	Lebanon	1:55.96	
58	2	8	Mahmoud Abu Garbieh	Palestine	1:56.37	NR
59	2	4	Nasir Yahya Hussain	Nepal	1:57.26	
60	3	7	Ado Gargovic	Montenegro	1:57.81	
61	3	8	Clinton Opute	Nigeria	1:57.92	
62	2	6	Justino Pale	Mozambique	1:58.32	
63	2	2	Muhammad Siddiqui	Pakistan	1:58.36	
64	3	3	Mohammed Al Zaki	Saudi Arabia	1:58.96	
65	1	1	Ali Sadeq Alawi	Bahrain	1:59.08	NR
66	2	2	Mal Gashi	Kosovo	1:59.20	
67	1	1	Hussein Suwaed	Iraq	1:59.69	
68	2	5	Issa Al-Adawi	Oman	2:00.09	
69	2	7	Israel Poppe	Guam	2:02.57	
70	2	9	Diego Aranda	Uruguay	2:02.84	
71	2	1	Sangay Tenzin	Bhutan	2:06.93	
72	1	4	Kyler Anthony Kihleng	Micronesia	2:07.89	
	3	5	Mark Ducaj	Albania	DNS	
	7	6	Lukas Martens	Germany	DNS	

=== Semifinals ===
The semifinals was started on 24 July at 21:11.

Rank	Heat	Lane	Name	Nationality	Time	Notes
1	2	5	David Popovici	Romania	1:44.70	Q
2	2	4	Luke Hobson	United States	1:44.87	Q
3	1	1	Hwang Sun-woo	South Korea	1:45.07	Q
4	1	5	Tom Dean	Great Britain	1:45.29	Q
5	1	4	Matt Richards	Great Britain	1:45.40	Q
6	2	3	Lee Ho-joon	South Korea	1:45.93	Q
7	1	3	Kieran Smith	United States	1:45.96	Q
8	1	2	Felix Auböck	Austria	1:45.97	
8	1	6	Katsuhiro Matsumoto	Japan	1:45.97	
10	2	1	Marco De Tullio	Italy	1:46.05	
10	2	7	Pan Zhanle	China	1:46.05	
12	2	8	Rafael Miroslaw	Germany	1:46.30	
13	1	7	Alexander Graham	Australia	1:46.61	
14	1	8	Antonio Djakovic	Switzerland	1:46.66	
15	2	6	Lucas Henveaux	Belgium	1:46.77	
16	2	2	Fernando Scheffer	Brazil	1:47.35	

==== Swim-off ====
The swim-off was held on 24 July at 22:00.

Rank	Lane	Name	Nationality	Time	Notes
1	4	Felix Auböck	Austria	1:46.30	Q
2	5	Katsuhiro Matsumoto	Japan	1:46.37	

=== Final ===
The final was held on 25 July at 20:02.

Rank	Lane	Name	Nationality	Time	Notes
1st place, gold medalist(s)	2	Matt Richards	Great Britain	1:44.30	
2nd place, silver medalist(s)	6	Tom Dean	Great Britain	1:44.32	
3rd place, bronze medalist(s)	3	Hwang Sun-woo	South Korea	1:44.42	NR
4	4	David Popovici	Romania	1:44.90	
5	5	Luke Hobson	United States	1:45.09	
6	7	Lee Ho-joon	South Korea	1:46.04	
7	1	Kieran Smith	United States	1:46.10	
8	8	Felix Auböck	Austria	1:46.40	
