= Swimming at the 2023 World Aquatics Championships – Men's 200 metre butterfly =

Men's 200 metre butterfly at the 2023 World Aquatics Championships
- Venue: Marine Messe Fukuoka
- Location: Fukuoka, Japan
- Dates: 25 July (heats and semifinals); 26 July (final)
- Competitors: 38 from 34 nations
- Winning time: 1:52.43

Medalists
gold medal	Léon Marchand	France
silver medal	Krzysztof Chmielewski	Poland
bronze medal	Tomoru Honda	Japan

The men's 200 metre butterfly competition at the 2023 World Aquatics Championships was held on 25 and 26 July 2023.

== Records ==
Prior to the competition, the existing world and championship records were as follows.

World record	Kristóf Milák (HUN)	1:50.34	Budapest, Hungary	21 June 2022
Competition record	Kristóf Milák (HUN)	1:50.34	Budapest, Hungary	21 June 2022

== Results ==
=== Heats ===
The heats were started on 25 July at 11:13.

Rank	Heat	Lane	Name	Nationality	Time	Notes
1	5	4	Tomoru Honda	Japan	1:54.21	Q
2	3	1	Arbidel González	Spain	1:54.99	Q, NR
3	4	6	Krzysztof Chmielewski	Poland	1:55.02	Q
4	5	2	Wang Kuan-hung	Chinese Taipei	1:55.17	Q
5	5	6	Alberto Razzetti	Italy	1:55.35	Q
6	4	5	Carson Foster	United States	1:55.36	Q
7	4	4	Léon Marchand	France	1:55.46	Q
8	5	3	Thomas Heilman	United States	1:55.59	Q
9	3	6	Niu Guangsheng	China	1:55.69	Q
10	4	3	Teppei Morimoto	Japan	1:55.72	Q
11	3	7	Denys Kesil	Ukraine	1:55.75	Q
12	5	5	Noè Ponti	Switzerland	1:55.85	Q
13	3	5	Ilya Kharun	Canada	1:55.93	Q
14	3	3	Richárd Márton	Hungary	1:56.03	Q
15	3	2	Lewis Clareburt	New Zealand	1:56.23	Q
16	5	1	Matthew Temple	Australia	1:56.51	Q, WD
17	4	2	Leonardo de Deus	Brazil	1:56.79	Q
18	5	7	Federico Burdisso	Italy	1:56.86	
19	3	4	Chen Juner	China	1:56.87	
20	4	8	Martin Espernberger	Austria	1:57.36	
21	4	1	Moon Seung-woo	South Korea	1:57.79	
22	5	8	Héctor Ruvalcaba	Mexico	1:57.80	
23	5	0	Sajan Prakash	India	1:58.07	
24	4	7	Kregor Zirk	Estonia	1:58.69	
25	5	9	Yeziel Morales	Puerto Rico	1:59.10	
26	2	4	Erick Gordillo	Guatemala	1:59.96	
27	3	9	Abdalla Nasr	Egypt	2:00.17	
28	4	0	Jorge Otaiza	Venezuela	2:01.83	
29	3	0	Navaphat Wongcharoen	Thailand	2:03.05	
30	2	5	Richard Nagy	Slovakia	2:03.33	
31	2	6	Simon Bachmann	Seychelles	2:03.57	
32	2	3	Diego Balbi	Peru	2:03.61	
33	1	3	Raekwon Noel	Guyana	2:05.65	NR
34	2	7	Gerald Hernández	Nicaragua	2:07.28	
35	2	1	Christian Jerome	Haiti	2:08.54	NR
36	4	9	Hồ Nguyễn Duy Khoa	Vietnam	2:11.47	
37	2	8	Ali Haidar	Kuwait	2:13.97	
38	1	4	Mohamed Rihan Shiham	Maldives	2:32.93	
	1	5	James Hendrix	Guam	DNS	
	2	2	Salem Sabt	United Arab Emirates	DNS	
	3	8	Jaouad Syoud	Algeria	DNS	

=== Semifinals ===
The semifinals were held on 25 July at 21:33.

Rank	Heat	Lane	Name	Nationality	Time	Notes
1	1	3	Carson Foster	United States	1:53.85	Q
2	2	6	Léon Marchand	France	1:54.21	Q
3	2	1	Ilya Kharun	Canada	1:54.28	Q, NR
4	2	5	Krzysztof Chmielewski	Poland	1:54.36	Q
5	2	4	Tomoru Honda	Japan	1:54.43	Q
6	1	1	Richárd Márton	Hungary	1:54.54	Q
7	1	6	Thomas Heilman	United States	1:54.57	Q
8	1	5	Wang Kuan-hung	Chinese Taipei	1:54.97	Q
9	2	3	Alberto Razzetti	Italy	1:55.00	
10	1	2	Teppei Morimoto	Japan	1:55.36	
11	1	7	Noè Ponti	Switzerland	1:55.44	
12	1	4	Arbidel González	Spain	1:55.61	
13	2	8	Lewis Clareburt	New Zealand	1:56.44	
14	2	7	Denys Kesil	Ukraine	1:56.89	
15	2	2	Niu Guangsheng	China	1:57.51	
16	1	8	Leonardo de Deus	Brazil	1:57.94	

=== Final ===
The final was held on 26 July at 20:53.

Rank	Lane	Name	Nationality	Time	Notes
1st place, gold medalist(s)	5	Léon Marchand	France	1:52.43	NR
2nd place, silver medalist(s)	6	Krzysztof Chmielewski	Poland	1:53.62	
3rd place, bronze medalist(s)	2	Tomoru Honda	Japan	1:53.66	
4	1	Thomas Heilman	United States	1:53.82	
4	3	Ilya Kharun	Canada	1:53.82	NR
6	4	Carson Foster	United States	1:54.74	
7	7	Richárd Márton	Hungary	1:55.02	
8	8	Wang Kuan-hung	Chinese Taipei	1:55.43	
