= Ecuador at the 2023 World Aquatics Championships =

- Flag of Ecuador
- FINA code: ECU
- National federation: Federación Ecuatoriana de Natación
- Website: fena-ecuador.org

in Fukuoka, Japan
- Competitors: 4 in 2 sports

World Aquatics Championships appearances
- 1973; 1975; 1978; 1982; 1986; 1991; 1994; 1998; 2001; 2003; 2005; 2007; 2009; 2011; 2013; 2015; 2017; 2019; 2022; 2023; 2024

Ecuador is set to compete at the 2023 World Aquatics Championships in Fukuoka, Japan from 14 to 30 July.

== Open water swimming ==
Ecuador entered 2 open water swimmers.

Men

Athlete	Event	Time	Rank
Esteban Enderica	Men's 5 km	56:49.5	19
Esteban Enderica	Men's 10 km	1:53:18.7	15
David Farinango	Men's 5 km	56:52.8	24
David Farinango	Men's 10 km	1:53:17.1	14

== Swimming ==
Ecuador entered 2 swimmers.

Men

Athlete	Event	Heat		Semifinal		Final	
Athlete	Event	Time	Rank	Time	Rank	Time	Rank
Tomas Peribonio	100 metre breaststroke	1:02.90 NR	42	Did not advance			
Tomas Peribonio	200 metre individual medley	2:01.14	22	Did not advance			

Women

Athlete	Event	Heat		Semifinal		Final	
Athlete	Event	Time	Rank	Time	Rank	Time	Rank
Anicka Delgado	50 metre freestyle	25.55	30	Did not advance			
Anicka Delgado	100 metre freestyle	55.57	27	Did not advance			
