= Swimming at the 2023 World Aquatics Championships – Men's 100 metre butterfly =

Men's 100 metre butterfly at the 2023 World Aquatics Championships
- Venue: Marine Messe Fukuoka
- Location: Fukuoka, Japan
- Dates: 28 July (heats and semifinals); 29 July (final)
- Competitors: 74 from 66 nations
- Winning time: 50.14

Medalists
gold medal	Maxime Grousset	France
silver medal	Joshua Liendo	Canada
bronze medal	Dare Rose	United States

The men's 100 metre butterfly competition at the 2023 World Aquatics Championships was held on 28 and 29 July 2023.

== Records ==
Prior to the competition, the existing world and championship records were as follows.

World record	Caeleb Dressel (USA)	49.45	Tokyo, Japan	31 July 2021
Competition record	Caeleb Dressel (USA)	49.50	Gwangju, South Korea	26 July 2019

== Results ==
=== Heats ===
The heats were started on 28 July at 10:32.

Rank	Heat	Lane	Name	Nationality	Time	Notes
1	7	3	Matthew Temple	Australia	50.76	Q
2	7	2	Nyls Korstanje	Netherlands	50.78	Q, NR
3	8	4	Joshua Liendo	Canada	50.98	Q
4	7	4	Maxime Grousset	France	51.00	Q
4	7	5	Noè Ponti	Switzerland	51.00	Q
6	6	4	Dare Rose	United States	51.17	Q
7	7	7	Ilya Kharun	Canada	51.33	Q
8	5	5	Josif Miladinov	Bulgaria	51.47	Q
8	7	0	Kayky Mota	Brazil	51.47	Q
10	6	5	Katsuhiro Matsumoto	Japan	51.48	Q
11	8	2	James Guy	Great Britain	51.50	Q
12	8	7	Diogo Ribeiro	Portugal	51.57	Q
13	8	0	Gal Cohen Groumi	Israel	51.61	Q
14	6	9	Adilbek Mussin	Kazakhstan	51.68	Q, NR
15	8	3	Tomer Frankel	Israel	51.76	Q
16	6	3	Jacob Peters	Great Britain	51.77	S/off
16	7	6	Thomas Heilman	United States	51.77	S/off
18	6	2	Wang Changhao	China	51.78	
19	8	5	Naoki Mizunuma	Japan	51.93	
20	6	7	Federico Burdisso	Italy	51.98	
21	7	1	Piero Codia	Italy	52.01	
22	7	9	Mario Molla Yanes	Spain	52.05	
23	6	1	Adrian Jaskiewicz	Poland	52.10	
24	8	1	Shaun Champion	Australia	52.15	
25	6	8	Sun Jiajun	China	52.16	
26	8	6	Simon Bucher	Austria	52.27	
27	6	0	Youssef Ramadan	Egypt	52.31	
27	8	8	Richárd Márton	Hungary	52.31	
29	5	0	Jorge Iga	Mexico	52.39	
30	8	9	Quah Zheng Wen	Singapore	52.53	
31	5	1	Kim Young-beom	South Korea	52.80	
32	4	4	Jarod Hatch	Suspended Member Federation	52.87	NR (Note: Philippine record – Suspended Member Federation competitor registered under Philippine Swimming)
33	5	2	Lewis Clareburt	New Zealand	52.89	
34	5	4	Daniel Zaitsev	Estonia	52.92	
35	4	3	Bryan Leong	Malaysia	52.96	NR
36	7	8	Jan Eric Friese	Germany	53.02	
37	5	6	Daniel Gracik	Czech Republic	53.13	
38	5	8	Andreas Vazaios	Greece	53.38	
39	5	3	Jorge Otaiza	Venezuela	53.44	
40	5	7	Max McCusker	Ireland	53.46	
41	4	6	Denys Kesil	Ukraine	53.47	
42	4	8	Abeku Jackson	Ghana	53.73	
43	4	5	Navaphat Wongcharoen	Thailand	53.84	
44	4	1	Diego Balbi	Peru	53.92	
45	4	7	Oskar Hoff	Sweden	53.97	
46	4	9	Steven Aimable	Senegal	53.98	
47	3	8	Tibor Tistan	Slovakia	54.30	
48	1	5	Isaiah Aleksenko	Northern Mariana Islands	54.46	NR
49	4	0	Benjamin Hockin	Paraguay	54.69	
50	3	2	Esteban Nuñez del Prado	Bolivia	55.26	
51	3	4	Salvador Gordo	Angola	55.44	
52	3	1	Davante Carey	Bahamas	55.48	
53	4	2	Joe Aditya Wijaya Kurniawan	Indonesia	55.55	
54	3	5	Tomas Lomero Arenas	Andorra	55.60	
55	3	7	Jeancarlo Calderon Harper	Panama	55.63	
56	2	6	Christian Jerome	Haiti	55.83	
57	3	3	Jayhan Odlum-Smith	Saint Lucia	55.86	
58	3	6	Yousuf Al-Matrooshi	United Arab Emirates	56.05	
59	1	6	Tameea Elhamayda	Qatar	56.11	
60	3	0	Zackary Gresham	Grenada	56.91	
61	3	9	Clinton Opute	Nigeria	57.19	
62	2	9	James Hendrix	Guam	57.65	
63	1	2	Osama Trabulsi	Syria	58.90	
64	2	4	Mohamad Masoud	Athlete Refugee Team	58.91	
65	2	2	Ali Haidar	Kuwait	59.94	
66	2	3	Abdulhai Ashour	Libya	59.98	
67	2	5	Kokoro Frost	Samoa	1:00.20	
68	1	4	Abdul Al-Kulaibi	Oman	1:01.18	NR
69	2	1	Kinley Lhendup	Bhutan	1:02.84	
70	1	7	Nathaniel Noka	Papua New Guinea	1:03.69	
71	2	7	Simanga Dlamini	Eswatini	1:04.50	
72	1	3	Nicky Irakoze	Burundi	1:05.28	
73	2	8	Elhadj Diallo	Guinea	1:05.39	
74	2	0	Troy Pina	Cape Verde	1:05.63	
	5	9	Jaouad Syoud	Algeria	DNS	
	6	6	Hubert Kós	Hungary	DNS	

==== Swim-off ====
The swim-off was started on 28 July at 12:55.

Rank	Lane	Name	Nationality	Time	Notes
1	4	Jacob Peters	Great Britain	51.39	Q
2	5	Thomas Heilman	United States	51.66	

=== Semifinals ===
The semifinals were held on 28 July at 20:09.

Rank	Heat	Lane	Name	Nationality	Time	Notes
1	1	3	Dare Rose	United States	50.53	Q
2	1	5	Maxime Grousset	France	50.62	Q
3	2	5	Joshua Liendo	Canada	50.75	Q
4	2	4	Matthew Temple	Australia	50.89	Q
5	1	4	Nyls Korstanje	Netherlands	50.98	Q
5	2	1	Gal Cohen Groumi	Israel	50.98	Q, NR
7	1	2	Katsuhiro Matsumoto	Japan	51.16	Q
8	2	3	Noè Ponti	Switzerland	51.17	Q
9	2	6	Ilya Kharun	Canada	51.22	
10	2	2	Kayky Mota	Brazil	51.43	
10	2	7	James Guy	Great Britain	51.43	
12	1	8	Jacob Peters	Great Britain	51.51	
13	1	7	Diogo Ribeiro	Portugal	51.54	
14	1	1	Adilbek Mussin	Kazakhstan	51.81	
14	1	6	Josif Miladinov	Bulgaria	51.81	
16	2	8	Tomer Frankel	Israel	52.04	

=== Final ===
The final was started on 29 July at 20:42.

Rank	Lane	Name	Nationality	Time	Notes
1st place, gold medalist(s)	5	Maxime Grousset	France	50.14	NR
2nd place, silver medalist(s)	3	Joshua Liendo	Canada	50.34	NR
3rd place, bronze medalist(s)	4	Dare Rose	United States	50.46	
4	6	Matthew Temple	Australia	50.81	
5	2	Nyls Korstanje	Netherlands	51.05	
6	1	Katsuhiro Matsumoto	Japan	51.20	
7	8	Noè Ponti	Switzerland	51.23	
8	7	Gal Cohen Groumi	Israel	51.32	
