= Open water swimming at the 2023 World Aquatics Championships – Men's 10 km =

Men's 10 km at the 2023 World Aquatics Championships
- Venue: Seaside Momochi Beach Park
- Location: Fukuoka, Japan
- Dates: 16 July
- Competitors: 67 from 42 nations
- Winning time: 1:50:40.3

Medalists
gold medal	Florian Wellbrock	Germany
silver medal	Kristóf Rasovszky	Hungary
bronze medal	Oliver Klemet	Germany

The men's 10 km competition at the 2023 World Aquatics Championships was held on 16 July 2023.

== Results ==
The race was held at 08:00.

Rank	Swimmer	Nationality	Time
1st place, gold medalist(s)	Florian Wellbrock	Germany	1:50:40.3
2nd place, silver medalist(s)	Kristóf Rasovszky	Hungary	1:50:59.0
3rd place, bronze medalist(s)	Oliver Klemet	Germany	1:51:00.8
4	Domenico Acerenza	Italy	1:51:16.7
5	Gregorio Paltrinieri	Italy	1:51:40.7
6	Athanasios Kynigakis	Greece	1:51:42.1
7	Nicholas Sloman	Australia	1:51:42.2
8	Matan Roditi	Israel	1:51:43.8
9	Logan Fontaine	France	1:52:41.7
10	Hector Pardoe	Great Britain	1:53:04.2
11	Paulo Strehlke	Mexico	1:53:04.4
12	Sacha Velly	France	1:53:14.7
13	Martin Straka	Czech Republic	1:53:16.2
14	David Farinango	Ecuador	1:53:17.1
15	Esteban Enderica	Ecuador	1:53:18.7
16	Dávid Betlehem	Hungary	1:53:30.9
17	Jan Hercog	Austria	1:54:02.2
18	Logan Vanhuys	Belgium	1:54:03.1
19	Guillem Pujol	Spain	1:54:03.1
20	Tiago Campos	Portugal	1:54:05.5
21	Franco Cassini	Argentina	1:54:07.4
22	Kaiki Furuhata	Japan	1:54:07.7
23	Diogo Cardoso	Portugal	1:54:08.7
24	Joaquín Moreno	Argentina	1:54:09.7
25	Asterios Daldogiannis	Greece	1:54:10.3
26	Christian Schreiber	Switzerland	1:54:11.5
27	Diogo Villarinho	Brazil	1:54:12.2
28	Taishin Minamide	Japan	1:54:12.6
29	Daniel Delgadillo	Mexico	1:54:12.7
30	Brennan Gravley	United States	1:54:13.0
31	Eric Hedlin	Canada	1:54:25.4
32	Eric Brown	Canada	1:55:31.2
33	Alexandre Finco	Brazil	1:55:32.5
34	Bailey Armstrong	Australia	1:55:32.8
35	Yonatan Ahdut	Israel	1:57:05.2
36	Joey Tepper	United States	1:57:23.9
37	Ondřej Zach	Czech Republic	1:57:36.7
38	Cho Cheng-chi	Chinese Taipei	1:59:19.7
39	Park Jae-hun	South Korea	2:00:09.5
40	Johndry Segovia	Venezuela	2:00:20.5
41	Lan Tianchen	China	2:00:37.5
42	Théo Druenne	Monaco	2:00:46.8
43	Connor Buck	South Africa	2:01:34.7
44	Adrián Ywanaga	Peru	2:02:36.0
45	Lev Cherepanov	Kazakhstan	2:03:08.4
46	Zhang Ziyang	China	2:03:46.2
47	Anurag Singh	India	2:03:52.5
48	William Yan Thorley	Hong Kong	2:04:20.4
49	Tomáš Peciar	Slovakia	2:04:22.2
50	Jeison Rojas	Costa Rica	2:04:33.1
51	Aflah Fadlan Prawira	Indonesia	2:04:41.7
52	Joshua Ashley	South Africa	2:04:53.6
53	Tanakrit Kittiya	Thailand	2:05:07.4
54	Keith Sin	Hong Kong	2:05:36.1
55	Ritchie Oh	Singapore	2:05:36.3
56	Daniil Androssov	Kazakhstan	2:05:36.4
57	Diego Vera	Venezuela	2:05:47.8
58	Christian Bayo	Puerto Rico	2:06:01.9
59	Sung Jun-ho	South Korea	2:06:23.8
60	Jamarr Bruno	Puerto Rico	2:10:19.8
61	Damien Payet	Seychelles	2:11:03.3
62	Maximiliano Paccot	Uruguay	2:11:12.6
63	Santiago Reyes	Guatemala	2:12:45.3
64	Nikita Kornilov	Uzbekistan	2:16:01.9
65	Fernando Ponce	Guatemala	2:18:54.5
	David Calderón	Bolivia	DNF
	Khomchan Wichachai	Thailand	DNF
	Artyom Lukasevits	Singapore	DNS
	Juan Morales	Colombia	DNS
