= Open water swimming at the 2023 World Aquatics Championships – Men's 5 km =

Men's 5 km at the 2023 World Aquatics Championships
- Venue: Seaside Momochi Beach Park
- Location: Fukuoka, Japan
- Dates: 18 July
- Competitors: 71 from 44 nations
- Winning time: 53:58.0

Medalists
| gold medal | Florian Wellbrock | Germany |
| silver medal | Gregorio Paltrinieri | Italy |
| bronze medal | Domenico Acerenza | Italy |

The men's 5 km competition at the 2023 World Aquatics Championships was held on 18 July 2023.

== Results ==
The race was started at 10:00.

| Rank | Swimmer | Nationality | Time |
|---|---|---|---|
| 1st place, gold medalist(s) | Florian Wellbrock | Germany | 53:58.0 |
| 2nd place, silver medalist(s) | Gregorio Paltrinieri | Italy | 54:02.5 |
| 3rd place, bronze medalist(s) | Domenico Acerenza | Italy | 54:04.2 |
| 4 | Oliver Klemet | Germany | 54:57.2 |
| 5 | Dávid Betlehem | Hungary | 54:58.6 |
| 6 | Athanasios Kynigakis | Greece | 54:58.6 |
| 7 | Kristóf Rasovszky | Hungary | 55:23.9 |
| 8 | Kyle Lee | Australia | 55:32.7 |
| 9 | Logan Fontaine | France | 55:33.0 |
| 10 | Sacha Velly | France | 55:33.1 |
| 11 | Mykhailo Romanchuk | Ukraine | 55:37.0 |
| 12 | Carlos Garach | Spain | 56:14.7 |
| 13 | Jack Wilson | Australia | 56:24.0 |
| 14 | Logan Vanhuys | Belgium | 56:43.2 |
| 15 | Hector Pardoe | Great Britain | 56:46.5 |
| 16 | Paulo Strehlke | Mexico | 56:46.6 |
| 17 | Dylan Gravley | United States | 56:48.5 |
| 18 | Christian Schreiber | Switzerland | 56:48.9 |
| 19 | Esteban Enderica | Ecuador | 56:49.5 |
| 20 | Martin Straka | Czech Republic | 56:49.5 |
| 21 | Jan Hercog | Austria | 56:52.0 |
| 22 | Ondřej Zach | Czech Republic | 56:52.2 |
| 23 | Connor Buck | South Africa | 56:52.4 |
| 24 | David Farinango | Ecuador | 56:52.8 |
| 25 | Tamás Farkas | Serbia | 56:53.5 |
| 26 | Eric Hedlin | Canada | 56:54.0 |
| 27 | Johndry Segovia | Venezuela | 56:57.4 |
| 28 | Brennan Gravley | United States | 57:20.0 |
| 29 | Benjamin Cote | Canada | 57:24.1 |
| 30 | Asterios Daldogiannis | Greece | 57:46.6 |
| 31 | Thiago Ruffini | Brazil | 57:47.3 |
| 32 | Bruce Almeida | Brazil | 57:48.2 |
| 33 | Guillem Pujol | Spain | 57:48.4 |
| 34 | Park Jae-hun | South Korea | 57:49.5 |
| 35 | Diogo Cardoso | Portugal | 57:49.7 |
| 36 | Cho Cheng-chi | Chinese Taipei | 57:51.6 |
| 37 | Kaito Tsujimori | Japan | 58:17.2 |
| 38 | Lev Cherepanov | Kazakhstan | 58:21.0 |
| 39 | Lan Tianchen | China | 58:44.7 |
| 40 | Riku Ezawa | Japan | 59:40.6 |
| 41 | Tomáš Peciar | Slovakia | 59:41.7 |
| 42 | Diego Vera | Venezuela | 59:41.9 |
| 43 | Christian Bayo | Puerto Rico | 59:44.4 |
| 44 | Serhiy Frolov | Ukraine | 59:59.5 |
| 45 | Adrián Ywanaga | Peru | 1:00:08.1 |
| 46 | Ziv Cohen | Israel | 1:00:10.6 |
| 47 | Théo Druenne | Monaco | 1:00:14.6 |
| 48 | Meng Rui | China | 1:00:58.8 |
| 49 | Jamarr Bruno | Puerto Rico | 1:01:01.9 |
| 50 | Grgo Mujan | Croatia | 1:01:09.6 |
| 51 | Maximiliano Paccot | Uruguay | 1:01:09.7 |
| 52 | Santiago Gutiérrez | Mexico | 1:01:21.9 |
| 53 | Jeison Rojas | Costa Rica | 1:01:28.3 |
| 54 | William Yan Thorley | Hong Kong | 1:01:28.4 |
| 55 | Keith Sin | Hong Kong | 1:01:28.8 |
| 56 | Galymzhan Balabek | Kazakhstan | 1:01:29.3 |
| 57 | Damien Payet | Seychelles | 1:01:56.4 |
| 58 | Sung Jun-ho | South Korea | 1:02:17.0 |
| 59 | Santiago Reyes | Guatemala | 1:05:42.9 |
| 60 | Prashans Hiremagalur | India | 1:05:43.7 |
| 61 | Nikita Kornilov | Uzbekistan | 1:06:22.4 |
| 62 | Fernando Ponce | Guatemala | 1:06:23.0 |
| 63 | Army Pal | India | 1:08:42.5 |
| | Ousseynou Diop | Senegal | OTL |
| | Yano Elias | Angola | OTL |
| | Hayyan Kisitu | Uganda | OTL |
| | Alejandro Plaza | Bolivia | OTL |
| | Matthew Caldwell | South Africa | DNF |
| | Adnan Kabuye | Uganda | DNF |
| | Tiago Campos | Portugal | DNF |
| | Vyacheslav Shkretov | Uzbekistan | DNF |
| | Alex Fortes | Angola | DNS |
