= Greece at the 2023 World Aquatics Championships =

- Flag of Greece
- World Aquatics code: GRE
- National federation: Hellenic Swimming Federation
- Website: koe.org.gr (in Greek)

in Fukuoka, Japan
- Competitors: 61 in 5 sports
- Medals Ranked 21st: Gold 0 Silver 1 Bronze 0 Total 1

World Aquatics Championships appearances
- 1973; 1975; 1978; 1982; 1986; 1991; 1994; 1998; 2001; 2003; 2005; 2007; 2009; 2011; 2013; 2015; 2017; 2019; 2022; 2023; 2024; 2025

Greece is set to compete at the 2023 World Aquatics Championships in Fukuoka, Japan from 14 to 30 July.

== Medalists ==
Medal	Name	Sport	Event	Date
2nd place, silver medalist(s)	Greece men's national water polo team: Emmanouil Zerdevas Konstantinos Genidounias Dimitrios Skoumpakis Efstathios Kalogeropoulos Ioannis Fountoulis Alexandros Papanastasiou Georgios Dervisis; Stylianos Argyropoulos Dimitrios Nikolaidis Konstantinos Kakaris Ioannis Alafragkis Konstantinos Gkiouvetsis Panagiotis Tzortzatos	Water polo	Men's tournament	July 29

== Athletes by discipline ==
The following is the list of number of competitors participating at the Championships per discipline.

Sport	Men	Women	Total
Artistic swimming	0	10	10
Diving	3	0	3
Open water swimming	2	1	3
Swimming	9	6	15
Water polo	15	15	30
Total	29	32	61

== Artistic swimming ==
Greece entered 10 artistic swimmers.

Women

Athlete	Event	Preliminaries		Final	
Athlete	Event	Points	Rank	Points	Rank
Evangelia Platanioti	Solo technical routine	252.2400	2 Q	252.5000	4
Evangelia Platanioti	Solo free routine	199.4834	3 Q	205.5459	5
Sofia Malkogeorgou; Evangelia Platanioti	Duet technical routine	236.1667	7 Q	238.4784	6
Sofia Malkogeorgou; Evangelia Platanioti	Duet free routine	173.0249	12 Q	189.4291	10

Mixed

Athlete	Event	Preliminaries		Final	
Athlete	Event	Points	Rank	Points	Rank
Maria Alzigkouzi Kominea; Eleni Fragkaki; Krystalenia Gialama; Maria Karapanagiotou; Danai Kariori; Ifigeneia Krommydaki; Sofia Malkogeorgou; Lydia Papanastasiou	Team acrobatic routine	144.1068	18	Did not advance	
Maria Alzigkouzi Kominea; Eleni Fragkaki; Krystalenia Gialama; Zoi Karangelou; Maria Karapanagiotou; Danai Kariori; Ifigeneia Krommydaki; Sofia Malkogeorgou	Team technical routine	261.7013	2 Q	259.4729	5
Maria Alzigkouzi Kominea; Eleni Fragkaki; Krystalenia Gialama; Zoi Karangelou; Maria Karapanagiotou; Danai Kariori; Ifigeneia Krommydaki; Sofia Malkogeorgou	Team free routine	221.8460	9 Q	232.6396	7

== Diving ==
Greece entered 3 divers.

Men

Athlete	Event	Preliminaries		Semifinals		Final	
Athlete	Event	Points	Rank	Points	Rank	Points	Rank
Theofilos Afthinos	3 m springboard	305.60	46	Did not advance			
Nikolaos Molvalis	10 m platform	346.70	25	—		Did not advance	
Athanasios Tsirikos	1 m springboard	240.75	54	—		Did not advance	
Athanasios Tsirikos	3 m springboard	235.30	64	Did not advance			
Athanasios Tsirikos	10 m platform	323.20	32	—		Did not advance	
Theofilos Afthinos; Nikolaos Molvalis	3 m synchro springboard	262.95	24	—		Did not advance	
Nikolaos Molvalis; Athanasios Tsirikos	10 m synchro platform	348.45	13	—		Did not advance	

== Open water swimming ==
Greece entered 3 open water swimmers.

Men

Athlete	Event	Time	Rank
Asterios Daldogiannis	Men's 5 km	57:46.6	30
Asterios Daldogiannis	Men's 10 km	1:54:10.3	25
Athanasios Kynigakis	Men's 5 km	54:58.6	6
Athanasios Kynigakis	Men's 10 km	1:51:42.1	6

Women

Athlete	Event	Time	Rank
Nefeli Giannopoulou	Women's 5 km	1:01:48.6	27

== Swimming ==
Greece entered 15 swimmers.

Men

Athlete	Event	Heat		Semifinal		Final	
Athlete	Event	Time	Rank	Time	Rank	Time	Rank
Arkadios Aspougalis	50 metre breaststroke	27.23	12 Q	27.50	15	Did not advance	
Stergios Bilas	50 metre butterfly	23.39	17	Did not advance			
Apostolos Christou	50 metre backstroke	24.48	2 Q	24.57	5 Q	24.60	6
Apostolos Christou	100 metre backstroke	54.01	19	Did not advance			
Kristian Gkolomeev	50 metre freestyle	21.91	9 Q	21.85	7 Q	21.82	7
Dimitrios Markos	200 metre freestyle	1:48.84	31	Did not advance			
Dimitrios Markos	400 metre freestyle	3:49.41	19	—		Did not advance	
Dimitrios Markos	800 metre freestyle	7:55.72	21	—		Did not advance	
Dimitrios Markos	1500 metre freestyle	15:07.61	18	—		Did not advance	
Odyssef Meladinis	100 metre freestyle	49.23	41	Did not advance			
Apostolos Papastamos	400 metre individual medley	4:14.52	10	—		Did not advance	
Apostolos Siskos	200 metre backstroke	1:57.40	5 Q	1:58.04	12	Did not advance	
Andreas Vazaios	100 metre butterfly	53.38	38	Did not advance			
Andreas Vazaios	200 metre individual medley	1:59.72	18	Did not advance			
Andreas Vazaios; Apostolos Christou; Odyssefs Meladinis; Kristian Gkolomeev	4 × 100 m freestyle relay	3:15.86	15	—		Did not advance	
Apostolos Siskos; Arkadios Aspougalis; Andreas Vazaios; Kristian Gkolomeev	4 × 100 m medley relay	3:42.02	20	—		Did not advance	

Women

Athlete	Event	Heat		Semifinal		Final	
Athlete	Event	Time	Rank	Time	Rank	Time	Rank
Georgia Damasioti	200 metre butterfly	2:11.03	17	Did not advance			
Theodora Drakou	50 metre freestyle	25.12	19	Did not advance			
Theodora Drakou	50 metre backstroke	28.20	12 Q	27.87	11	Did not advance	
Maria-Thaleia Drasidou	50 metre breaststroke	31.44	27	Did not advance			
Maria-Thaleia Drasidou	100 metre breaststroke	1:10.67	40	Did not advance			
Eleni Kontogeorgou	200 metre breaststroke	2:30.46	24	Did not advance			
Anna Ntountounaki	50 metre butterfly	26.14	12 Q	25.82	9	Did not advance	
Anna Ntountounaki	100 metre butterfly	58.12	12 Q	57.79	12	Did not advance	
Artemis Vasilaki	200 metre freestyle	2:03.92	44	Did not advance			
Artemis Vasilaki	800 metre freestyle	8:49.61	28	—		Did not advance	
Theodora Drakou; Eleni Kontogeorgou; Anna Ntountounaki; Maria-Thalia Drasidou	4 × 100 m medley relay	4:04.99	17	—		Did not advance	

Mixed

Athlete	Event	Heat		Final	
Athlete	Event	Time	Rank	Time	Rank
Andreas Vazaios; Stergios Bilas; Theodora Drakou; Maria-Thaleia Drasidou	4 × 100 m freestyle relay	3:28.96	15	Did not advance	
Apostolos Christou; Arkadios Aspougalis; Anna Ntountounaki; Maria-Thaleia Drasidou	4 × 100 m medley relay	3:47.57	14	Did not advance	

== Water polo ==
Summary

Team	Event	Group stage				Playoff	Quarterfinal	Semifinal	Final / BM	
Team	Event	Opposition Score	Opposition Score	Opposition Score	Rank	Opposition Score	Opposition Score	Opposition Score	Opposition Score	Rank
Greece	Men's tournament	Australia; W 13–9	Kazakhstan; W 18–2	United States; W 15–14	1 Q	—	Montenegro; W 10–9	Serbia; W 13–7	Hungary; L 13–14	2nd place, silver medalist(s)
Greece	Women's tournament	South Africa; W 24–2	Argentina; W 21–2	Italy; W 16–12	1 Q	—	Australia; L 8–9	Hungary; L 9–10	Canada; L 12–14	8

=== Men's tournament ===
Team roster

The following is the Greek roster.

Head coach: Theodoros Vlachos

- 1 Emmanouil Zerdevas GK
- 2 Konstantinos Genidounias FP
- 3 Dimitrios Skoumpakis FP
- 4 Efstathios Kalogeropoulos FP
- 5 Ioannis Fountoulis FP
- 6 Alexandros Papanastasiou FP
- 7 Georgios Dervisis FP
- 8 Stylianos Argyropoulos FP
- 9 Dimitrios Nikolaidis FP
- 10 Konstantinos Kakaris FP
- 11 Ioannis Alafragkis FP
- 12 Konstantinos Gkiouvetsis FP
- 13 Panagiotis Tzortzatos GK
- Nikolaos Gkillas FP
- Aristeidis Chalyvopoulos FP

Group play

Pos	Team	Pld	W	PSW	PSL	L	GF	GA	GD	Pts	Qualification
1	Greece	3	3	0	0	0	46	25	+21	9	Quarterfinals
2	United States	3	2	0	0	1	48	28	+20	6	Playoffs
3	Australia	3	1	0	0	2	39	35	+4	3	Playoffs
4	Kazakhstan	3	0	0	0	3	13	58	−45	0	

Source: Sportresult
Rules for classification: 1) points; 2) head-to-head points; 3) head-to-head goal difference; 4) head-to-head number of goals scored; 5) Goal difference.

17 July 2023; 10:30	Report	Australia	9–13	Greece	Marine Messe Fukuoka, Fukuoka; Referees: Adrian-Tiberiu Alexandrescu (ROU), Veselin Mišković (MNE)
17 July 2023; 10:30	Report	Score by quarters: 2–2, 1–3, 3–3, 3–5			Marine Messe Fukuoka, Fukuoka; Referees: Adrian-Tiberiu Alexandrescu (ROU), Veselin Mišković (MNE)
17 July 2023; 10:30	Report	Power 4	Goals	Argyropoulos 3	Marine Messe Fukuoka, Fukuoka; Referees: Adrian-Tiberiu Alexandrescu (ROU), Veselin Mišković (MNE)

19 July 2023; 17:30	Report	Greece	18–2	Kazakhstan	Marine Messe Fukuoka, Fukuoka; Referees: Raffaele Colombo (ITA), Germán Moller (ARG)
19 July 2023; 17:30	Report	Score by quarters: 6–1, 5–0, 4–1, 3–0			Marine Messe Fukuoka, Fukuoka; Referees: Raffaele Colombo (ITA), Germán Moller (ARG)
19 July 2023; 17:30	Report	three players 3	Goals	Akhmetov, Ruday 1	Marine Messe Fukuoka, Fukuoka; Referees: Raffaele Colombo (ITA), Germán Moller (ARG)

21 July 2023; 13:30	Report	United States	14–15	Greece	Marine Messe Fukuoka, Fukuoka; Referees: Boris Margeta (SLO), Frank Ohme (GER)
21 July 2023; 13:30	Report	Score by quarters: 3–3, 6–1, 2–4, 3–7			Marine Messe Fukuoka, Fukuoka; Referees: Boris Margeta (SLO), Frank Ohme (GER)
21 July 2023; 13:30	Report	Irving 6	Goals	Genidounias, Papanastasiou 4	Marine Messe Fukuoka, Fukuoka; Referees: Boris Margeta (SLO), Frank Ohme (GER)

Quarterfinals

25 July 2023; 15:00	Report	Greece	10–9	Montenegro	Marine Messe Fukuoka, Fukuoka; Referees: Boris Margeta (SLO), Tamás Kovács-Csatlós (HUN)
25 July 2023; 15:00	Report	Score by quarters: 2–1, 4–3, 1–3, 3–2			Marine Messe Fukuoka, Fukuoka; Referees: Boris Margeta (SLO), Tamás Kovács-Csatlós (HUN)
25 July 2023; 15:00	Report	Genidounias 5	Goals	Radović 3	Marine Messe Fukuoka, Fukuoka; Referees: Boris Margeta (SLO), Tamás Kovács-Csatlós (HUN)

Semifinals

27 July 2023; 17:00	Report	Greece	13–7	Serbia	Marine Messe Fukuoka, Fukuoka; Referees: Nenad Peris (CRO), Raffaele Colombo (ITA)
27 July 2023; 17:00	Report	Score by quarters: 3–2, 3–0, 3–3, 4–2			Marine Messe Fukuoka, Fukuoka; Referees: Nenad Peris (CRO), Raffaele Colombo (ITA)
27 July 2023; 17:00	Report	Argyropoulos, Kakaris 3	Goals	Jakšić, Rašović 2	Marine Messe Fukuoka, Fukuoka; Referees: Nenad Peris (CRO), Raffaele Colombo (ITA)

Final

29 July 2023; 18:00	Report	Greece	13–14 (PSO)	Hungary	Marine Messe Fukuoka, Fukuoka; Referees: Michiel Zwartt (NED), Vojin Putniković (SRB)
29 July 2023; 18:00	Report	Score by quarters: 2–4, 2–1, 3–2, 3–3 PSO: 3–4			Marine Messe Fukuoka, Fukuoka; Referees: Michiel Zwartt (NED), Vojin Putniković (SRB)
29 July 2023; 18:00	Report	Genidounias 4	Goals	Manhercz, Zalánki 3	Marine Messe Fukuoka, Fukuoka; Referees: Michiel Zwartt (NED), Vojin Putniković (SRB)

=== Women's tournament ===
Team roster

The following is the Greek roster.

Head coach: Alexia Kammenou

- 1 Chrysi Diamantopoulou GK
- 2 Eleftheria Plevritou FP
- 3 Ioanna Chydirioti FP
- 4 Nikoleta Eleftheriadou FP
- 5 Margarita Plevritou FP
- 6 Eleni Xenaki FP
- 7 Eirini Ninou FP
- 8 Foteini Tricha FP
- 9 Christina Siouti FP
- 10 Vasiliki Plevritou FP
- 11 Eleftheria Fountotou FP
- 12 Maria Myriokefalitaki FP
- 13 Ioanna Stamatopoulou GK
- Eleni Elliniadi FP
- Athina Giannopoulou FP

Group play

Pos	Team	Pld	W	PSW	PSL	L	GF	GA	GD	Pts	Qualification
1	Greece	3	3	0	0	0	61	16	+45	9	Quarterfinals
2	Italy	3	2	0	0	1	63	19	+44	6	Playoffs
3	South Africa	3	1	0	0	2	16	57	−41	3	Playoffs
4	Argentina	3	0	0	0	3	12	60	−48	0	

Source: Sportresult
Rules for classification: 1) points; 2) head-to-head points; 3) head-to-head goal difference; 4) head-to-head number of goals scored; 5) Goal difference.

16 July 2023; 17:30	Report	Greece	24–2	South Africa	Marine Messe Fukuoka, Fukuoka; Referees: Nicola Johnson (AUS), Darren Spiritsanto (USA)
16 July 2023; 17:30	Report	Score by quarters: 7–1, 6–1, 6–0, 5–0			Marine Messe Fukuoka, Fukuoka; Referees: Nicola Johnson (AUS), Darren Spiritsanto (USA)
16 July 2023; 17:30	Report	Fountotou, E. Plevritou 4	Goals	Sileno, Zondo 1	Marine Messe Fukuoka, Fukuoka; Referees: Nicola Johnson (AUS), Darren Spiritsanto (USA)

18 July 2023; 13:30	Report	Argentina	2–21	Greece	Marine Messe Fukuoka, Fukuoka; Referees: Adil Aimbetov (KAZ), Nicola Johnson (AUS)
18 July 2023; 13:30	Report	Score by quarters: 1–6, 0–5, 1–6, 0–4			Marine Messe Fukuoka, Fukuoka; Referees: Adil Aimbetov (KAZ), Nicola Johnson (AUS)
18 July 2023; 13:30	Report	Bacigalupo, Hatcher 1	Goals	three players 3	Marine Messe Fukuoka, Fukuoka; Referees: Adil Aimbetov (KAZ), Nicola Johnson (AUS)

20 July 2023; 10:30	Report	Greece	16–12	Italy	Marine Messe Fukuoka, Fukuoka; Referees: Nenad Peris (CRO), Matan Schwartz (ISR)
20 July 2023; 10:30	Report	Score by quarters: 6–4, 4–1, 3–2, 3–5			Marine Messe Fukuoka, Fukuoka; Referees: Nenad Peris (CRO), Matan Schwartz (ISR)
20 July 2023; 10:30	Report	four players 3	Goals	four players 2	Marine Messe Fukuoka, Fukuoka; Referees: Nenad Peris (CRO), Matan Schwartz (ISR)

Quarterfinals

24 July 2023; 18:00	Report	Greece	8–9	Australia	Marine Messe Fukuoka, Fukuoka; Referees: Jennifer McCall (USA), Sébastien Dervieux (FRA)
24 July 2023; 18:00	Report	Score by quarters: 4–3, 1–4, 3–2, 0–0			Marine Messe Fukuoka, Fukuoka; Referees: Jennifer McCall (USA), Sébastien Dervieux (FRA)
24 July 2023; 18:00	Report	Xenaki 3	Goals	four players 2	Marine Messe Fukuoka, Fukuoka; Referees: Jennifer McCall (USA), Sébastien Dervieux (FRA)

5–8th place semifinals

26 July 2023; 15:30	Report	Greece	9–10	Hungary	Marine Messe Fukuoka, Fukuoka; Referees: Matan Schwartz (ISR), Zhang Liang (CHN)
26 July 2023; 15:30	Report	Score by quarters: 1–2, 2–2, 4–5, 2–1			Marine Messe Fukuoka, Fukuoka; Referees: Matan Schwartz (ISR), Zhang Liang (CHN)
26 July 2023; 15:30	Report	Ninou 3	Goals	Garda, Keszthelyi 3	Marine Messe Fukuoka, Fukuoka; Referees: Matan Schwartz (ISR), Zhang Liang (CHN)

Seventh place game

28 July 2023; 11:30	Report	Canada	14–12 (PSO)	Greece	Marine Messe Fukuoka, Fukuoka; Referees: Nóra Debreceni (HUN), Nicola Johnson (AUS)
28 July 2023; 11:30	Report	Score by quarters: 4–1, 1–4, 4–1, 1–4 PSO: 4–2			Marine Messe Fukuoka, Fukuoka; Referees: Nóra Debreceni (HUN), Nicola Johnson (AUS)
28 July 2023; 11:30	Report	Wright 3	Goals	Xenaki 3	Marine Messe Fukuoka, Fukuoka; Referees: Nóra Debreceni (HUN), Nicola Johnson (AUS)
