= Swimming at the 2023 World Aquatics Championships – Women's 200 metre freestyle =

Women's 200 metre freestyle at the 2023 World Aquatics Championships
- Venue: Marine Messe Fukuoka
- Location: Fukuoka, Japan
- Dates: 25 July (heats and semifinals); 26 July (final)
- Competitors: 65 from 56 nations
- Winning time: 1:52.85 WR

Medalists
gold medal	Mollie O'Callaghan	Australia
silver medal	Ariarne Titmus	Australia
bronze medal	Summer McIntosh	Canada

The women's 200 metre freestyle competition at the 2023 World Aquatics Championships was held on 25 and 26 July 2023.

== Records ==
Prior to the competition, the existing world and championship records were as follows.

World record	Federica Pellegrini (ITA)	1:52.98	Rome, Italy	29 July 2009
Competition record	Federica Pellegrini (ITA)	1:52.98	Rome, Italy	29 July 2009

The following new records were set during this competition.

Date	Event	Name	Nationality	Time	Record
26 July	Final	Mollie O'Callaghan	Australia	1:52.85	WR

== Results ==
=== Heats ===
The heats were started on 25 July 10:47.

Rank	Heat	Lane	Name	Nationality	Time	Notes
1	6	4	Mollie O'Callaghan	Australia	1:55.68	Q
2	5	4	Summer McIntosh	Canada	1:55.88	Q
3	7	4	Ariarne Titmus	Australia	1:56.20	Q
4	7	5	Siobhán Haughey	Hong Kong	1:56.56	Q
5	7	3	Marrit Steenbergen	Netherlands	1:56.66	Q
6	7	6	Liu Yaxin	China	1:56.93	Q
7	6	3	Freya Anderson	Great Britain	1:57.12	Q
8	7	1	Nikolett Pádár	Hungary	1:57.35	Q
8	7	7	Barbora Seemanová	Czech Republic	1:57.35	Q
10	5	5	Erika Fairweather	New Zealand	1:57.36	Q
11	5	3	Bella Sims	United States	1:57.71	Q
12	6	5	Claire Weinstein	United States	1:57.93	Q
13	7	2	Janja Šegel	Slovenia	1:58.02	Q
14	4	3	Snæfríður Jórunnardóttir	Iceland	1:58.14	Q, NR
15	7	0	Janna van Kooten	Netherlands	1:58.16	Q
16	5	1	Valentine Dumont	Belgium	1:58.23	Q
17	6	6	Li Jiaping	China	1:58.26	
18	5	6	Abbie Wood	Great Britain	1:58.39	
19	6	7	Mary-Sophie Harvey	Canada	1:58.50	
20	5	7	Maria Fernanda Costa	Brazil	1:58.67	
21	6	8	Ajna Késely	Hungary	1:58.99	
22	7	8	Nagisa Ikemoto	Japan	1:59.23	
23	6	0	Anastasia Gorbenko	Israel	1:59.27	
24	6	1	Aimee Canny	South Africa	1:59.30	
25	5	0	Signe Bro	Denmark	1:59.33	
26	6	2	Stephanie Balduccini	Brazil	1:59.55	
27	5	8	Daria Golovaty	Israel	1:59.77	
28	4	5	Elisbet Gámez	Cuba	1:59.98	
29	4	0	María José Mata	Mexico	2:00.30	
30	4	7	Karen Durango	Colombia	2:00.71	
31	4	8	María Yegres	Venezuela	2:00.82	
31	6	9	Victoria Catterson	Ireland	2:00.82	
33	3	6	Ieva Maļuka	Latvia	2:00.94	NR
34	5	9	Hur Yeon-kyung	South Korea	2:01.19	
35	5	2	Katja Fain	Slovenia	2:01.31	
36	4	6	Cornelia Pammer	Austria	2:01.66	
37	3	5	Inés Marín	Chile	2:02.20	
38	3	3	Kamonchanok Kwanmuang	Thailand	2:02.22	
39	3	4	Gan Ching Hwee	Singapore	2:02.32	
40	4	9	Batbayaryn Enkhkhüslen	Mongolia	2:02.49	
41	4	2	Sofia Åstedt	Sweden	2:02.57	
42	4	4	Merve Tuncel	Turkey	2:02.66	
43	7	9	Ainhoa Campabadal	Spain	2:02.78	
44	4	1	Artemis Vasilaki	Greece	2:03.92	
45	3	2	Iman Avdić	Bosnia and Herzegovina	2:04.38	
46	3	1	Lucero Mejia	Guatemala	2:06.24	
47	3	9	Harper Barrowman	Cayman Islands	2:06.49	
48	3	7	Julimar Ávila	Honduras	2:06.92	
49	2	5	Ani Poghosyan	Armenia	2:08.65	
50	2	4	Danielle Treasure	Barbados	2:08.88	
51	2	3	Paige van der Westhuizen	Zimbabwe	2:09.85	
52	1	6	Anna Nikishkina	Kyrgyzstan	2:10.81	
53	2	6	Jehanara Nabi	Pakistan	2:11.09	NR
54	3	8	Mya Azzopardi	Malta	2:11.59	
55	2	1	Duana Lama	Nepal	2:12.46	
56	2	7	Natalia Kuipers	U.S. Virgin Islands	2:12.60	
57	2	8	Bianca Mitchell	Antigua and Barbuda	2:13.24	
58	2	0	Chloe Farro	Aruba	2:13.48	
59	1	5	Asma Lefalher	Bahrain	2:13.80	NR
60	2	2	Maria Lopes Freitas	Angola	2:14.03	
61	1	2	Katie Rock	Albania	2:15.02	
62	1	4	Mya de Freitas	Saint Vincent and the Grenadines	2:16.22	
63	2	9	Charissa Panuve	Tonga	2:20.00	
64	1	3	Galyah Ngerchesiuch Mikel	Palau	2:43.01	
	3	0	Laura Bernat	Poland	DSQ	

=== Semifinals ===
The semifinals were held on 25 July at 21:13.

Rank	Heat	Lane	Name	Nationality	Time	Notes
1	2	5	Ariarne Titmus	Australia	1:54.64	Q
2	1	4	Summer McIntosh	Canada	1:54.67	Q
3	2	4	Mollie O'Callaghan	Australia	1:54.91	Q
4	2	7	Bella Sims	United States	1:55.45	Q
5	1	5	Siobhán Haughey	Hong Kong	1:55.48	Q
6	2	6	Freya Anderson	Great Britain	1:55.85	Q
7	1	3	Liu Yaxin	China	1:56.34	Q
8	2	3	Marrit Steenbergen	Netherlands	1:56.49	Q
9	2	2	Barbora Seemanová	Czech Republic	1:56.50	
10	1	6	Nikolett Pádár	Hungary	1:56.55	
11	1	2	Erika Fairweather	New Zealand	1:56.87	
12	1	7	Claire Weinstein	United States	1:57.03	
13	1	8	Valentine Dumont	Belgium	1:57.97	
14	1	1	Snæfríður Jórunnardóttir	Iceland	1:57.98	NR
15	2	8	Janna van Kooten	Netherlands	1:58.12	
16	2	1	Janja Šegel	Slovenia	1:58.18	

=== Final ===
The final was held on 26 July at 20:17.

Rank	Lane	Name	Nationality	Time	Notes
1st place, gold medalist(s)	3	Mollie O'Callaghan	Australia	1:52.85	WR
2nd place, silver medalist(s)	4	Ariarne Titmus	Australia	1:53.01	
3rd place, bronze medalist(s)	5	Summer McIntosh	Canada	1:53.65	WJ, NR
4	2	Siobhán Haughey	Hong Kong	1:53.96	
5	8	Marrit Steenbergen	Netherlands	1:55.51	
6	6	Bella Sims	United States	1:56.00	
7	7	Freya Anderson	Great Britain	1:56.33	
8	1	Liu Yaxin	China	1:56.97	
