= Swimming at the 2023 World Aquatics Championships – Men's 200 metre individual medley =

Men's 200 metre individual medley at the 2023 World Aquatics Championships
- Venue: Marine Messe Fukuoka
- Location: Fukuoka, Japan
- Dates: 26 July (heats and semifinals); 27 July (final)
- Competitors: 49 from 43 nations
- Winning time: 1:54.82

Medalists
gold medal	Léon Marchand	France
silver medal	Duncan Scott	Great Britain
bronze medal	Tom Dean	Great Britain

The men's 200 metre individual medley competition at the 2023 World Aquatics Championships was held on 26 and 27 July 2023.

== Records ==
Prior to the competition, the existing world and championship records were as follows.

World record	Ryan Lochte (USA)	1:54.00	Shanghai, China	28 July 2011
Competition record	Ryan Lochte (USA)	1:54.00	Shanghai, China	28 July 2011

== Results ==
=== Heats ===
The heats were started on 26 July at 11:17.

Rank	Heat	Lane	Name	Nationality	Time	Notes
1	5	5	Duncan Scott	Great Britain	1:57.76	Q
2	4	5	Daiya Seto	Japan	1:57.80	Q
3	6	6	So Ogata	Japan	1:57.88	Q
4	6	7	Jérémy Desplanches	Switzerland	1:58.00	Q
5	5	6	Lewis Clareburt	New Zealand	1:58.08	Q
6	6	3	Tom Dean	Great Britain	1:58.20	Q
7	6	5	Carson Foster	United States	1:58.24	Q
8	4	6	Thomas Neill	Australia	1:58.30	Q
9	6	4	Léon Marchand	France	1:58.38	Q
10	4	7	Hugo González	Spain	1:58.47	Q
11	5	4	Shaine Casas	United States	1:58.56	Q
12	4	3	Finlay Knox	Canada	1:58.64	Q
13	6	2	Alberto Razzetti	Italy	1:58.74	Q
14	5	7	Gabriel Lopes	Portugal	1:58.77	Q
15	6	1	Brendon Smith	Australia	1:59.03	Q
16	4	4	Wang Shun	China	1:59.05	Q
17	5	2	Ron Polonsky	Israel	1:59.15	
18	5	8	Andreas Vazaios	Greece	1:59.72	
18	5	9	Berke Saka	Turkey	1:59.72	
20	6	8	Gal Cohen Groumi	Israel	2:00.00	
21	4	0	Wang Hsing-hao	Chinese Taipei	2:00.01	
22	5	0	Tomas Peribonio	Ecuador	2:01.14	
23	4	1	Carles Coll	Spain	2:01.22	
24	3	5	Bernhard Reitshammer	Austria	2:01.42	
25	4	8	Kim Min-suk	South Korea	2:01.75	
26	5	1	Ádám Telegdy	Hungary	2:01.82	
27	3	2	Erick Gordillo	Guatemala	2:02.64	
28	3	0	Munzer Kabbara	Lebanon	2:02.99	NR
29	3	7	Kristaps Mikelsons	Latvia	2:03.38	
30	3	4	Daniil Pancerevas	Lithuania	2:03.76	
31	6	9	Héctor Ruvalcaba	Mexico	2:03.87	
32	3	3	Frantisek Jablcnik	Slovakia	2:03.89	
33	2	4	Bernhard Tyler Christianson	Panama	2:04.71	
34	4	9	Tan Zachary Ian	Singapore	2:04.92	
35	6	0	Trần Hưng Nguyên	Vietnam	2:05.77	
36	3	8	Ronan Wantenaar	Namibia	2:05.97	
37	3	9	Tan Khai Xin	Malaysia	2:06.31	
38	3	1	Santiago Corredor	Colombia	2:06.37	
39	2	2	Esteban Nuñez del Prado	Bolivia	2:06.60	
40	2	5	Jarod Arroyo	Puerto Rico	2:06.67	
41	2	3	Simon Bachmann	Seychelles	2:08.50	
42	2	6	Zhulian Lavdaniti	Albania	2:09.32	
43	1	3	Lin Sizhuang	Macau	2:10.10	
44	2	1	Nikola Ǵuretanoviḱ	North Macedonia	2:13.17	
45	2	7	Thomas Wareing	Malta	2:13.80	
46	1	5	Abdul Al-Kulaibi	Oman	2:20.01	
47	1	4	Hussein Suwaed	Iraq	2:20.23	
48	2	0	Kinley Lhendup	Bhutan	2:28.39	
	2	8	Filipe Gomes	Malawi	Did not start	
	4	2	Jaouad Syoud	Algeria	Did not start	
	5	3	Hubert Kós	Hungary	Did not start	
	3	6	Matheo Mateos	Paraguay	Disqualified	

=== Semifinals ===
The semifinals was held on 26 July at 21:29.

Rank	Heat	Lane	Name	Nationality	Time	Notes
1	2	2	Léon Marchand	France	1:56.34	Q
2	2	4	Duncan Scott	Great Britain	1:56.50	Q
3	2	6	Carson Foster	United States	1:56.55	Q
4	1	2	Hugo González	Spain	1:56.58	Q
5	2	5	So Ogata	Japan	1:57.06	Q
6	1	4	Daiya Seto	Japan	1:57.15	Q
7	1	3	Tom Dean	Great Britain	1:57.18	Q
8	2	7	Shaine Casas	United States	1:57.23	Q
9	2	1	Alberto Razzetti	Italy	1:57.39	
10	1	6	Thomas Neill	Australia	1:57.51	
11	1	8	Wang Shun	China	1:57.97	
12	2	3	Lewis Clareburt	New Zealand	1:58.01	
13	1	7	Finlay Knox	Canada	1:58.23	
14	1	5	Jérémy Desplanches	Switzerland	1:58.29	
15	2	8	Brendon Smith	Australia	1:59.35	
16	1	1	Gabriel Lopes	Portugal	2:00.28	

=== Final ===
The final was held on 27 July at 21:03.

Rank	Lane	Name	Nationality	Time	Notes
1st place, gold medalist(s)	4	Léon Marchand	France	1:54.82	ER
2nd place, silver medalist(s)	5	Duncan Scott	Great Britain	1:55.95	
3rd place, bronze medalist(s)	1	Tom Dean	Great Britain	1:56.07	
4	8	Shaine Casas	United States	1:56.35	
5	3	Carson Foster	United States	1:56.43	
6	7	Daiya Seto	Japan	1:56.70	
7	6	Hugo González	Spain	1:57.37	
8	2	So Ogata	Japan	1:57.82	
