= Swimming at the 2023 World Aquatics Championships – Men's 100 metre breaststroke =

Men's 100 metre breaststroke at the 2023 World Aquatics Championships
- Venue: Marine Messe Fukuoka
- Location: Fukuoka, Japan
- Dates: 23 July (heats and semifinals); 24 July (final)
- Competitors: 69 from 66 nations
- Winning time: 57.69

Medalists
gold medal	Qin Haiyang	China
silver medal	Nicolò Martinenghi	Italy
silver medal	Arno Kamminga	Netherlands
silver medal	Nic Fink	United States

The men's 100 metre breaststroke competition at the 2023 World Aquatics Championships was held on 23 and 24 July 2023.

== Records ==
Prior to the competition, the existing world and championship records were as follows.

World record	Adam Peaty (GBR)	56.88	Gwangju, South Korea	21 July 2019
Competition record	Adam Peaty (GBR)	56.88	Gwangju, South Korea	21 July 2019

== Results ==
=== Heats ===
The heats were started on 22 July at 12:26.

Rank	Heat	Lane	Name	Nationality	Time	Notes
1	7	4	Qin Haiyang	China	58.26	Q, AS
2	7	5	Arno Kamminga	Netherlands	58.71	Q
3	6	3	Lucas Matzerath	Germany	58.74	Q, NR
4	6	4	Nicolò Martinenghi	Italy	59.04	Q
5	5	4	Nic Fink	United States	59.38	Q
6	7	6	Josh Matheny	United States	59.40	Q
7	6	5	Federico Poggio	Italy	59.43	Q
8	7	3	James Wilby	Great Britain	59.66	Q
9	5	5	Yan Zibei	China	59.73	Q
10	6	6	Andrius Šidlauskas	Lithuania	59.90	Q
11	6	8	Denis Petrashov	Kyrgyzstan	59.91	Q, NR
12	7	7	Choi Dong-yeol	South Korea	59.94	Q
13	5	3	Berkay Ömer Öğretir	Turkey	59.99	Q
14	6	7	João Gomes Júnior	Brazil	1:00.12	Q
15	5	2	Bernhard Reitshammer	Austria	1:00.20	Q
16	5	6	Zac Stubblety-Cook	Australia	1:00.22	Q
17	7	2	Ippei Watanabe	Japan	1:00.28	
18	6	2	Valentin Bayer	Austria	1:00.51	
19	5	1	Darragh Greene	Ireland	1:00.54	
20	6	1	Matti Mattsson	Finland	1:00.62	
21	5	8	Anton McKee	Iceland	1:00.86	
22	7	8	Dawid Wiekiera	Poland	1:00.89	
23	4	5	Jérémy Desplanches	Switzerland	1:00.95	
24	5	9	Maksym Ovchynnikov	Ukraine	1:01.01	
25	5	7	Miguel de Lara	Mexico	1:01.02	
26	7	1	Erik Persson	Sweden	1:01.03	
27	5	0	Lyubomir Epitropov	Bulgaria	1:01.16	
28	7	0	James Dergousoff	Canada	1:01.19	
29	6	0	Jorge Murillo	Colombia	1:01.23	
30	4	3	Michael Houlie	South Africa	1:01.58	
31	4	9	Peter Stevens	Slovenia	1:01.59	
32	4	7	Gabriel Lopes	Portugal	1:01.69	
33	4	4	Joshua Gilbert	New Zealand	1:01.79	
34	4	1	Amro Al-Wir	Jordan	1:01.80	
35	4	6	Ronan Wantenaar	Namibia	1:01.91	
36	3	2	Mariano Lazzerini	Chile	1:01.97	
37	3	4	Jadon Wuilliez	Antigua and Barbuda	1:02.10	NR
38	3	6	Chao Man Hou	Macau	1:02.19	
39	4	8	Adam Chillingworth	Hong Kong	1:02.43	
40	4	2	Maximillian Wei Ang	Singapore	1:02.45	
41	1	8	Alexandre Grand'Pierre	Haiti	1:02.65	NR
42	2	3	Tomas Peribonio	Ecuador	1:02.90	NR
43	4	0	Julio Horrego	Honduras	1:03.04	
44	3	5	Muhammad Dwiky Raharjo	Indonesia	1:03.18	
45	2	4	Constantin Malachi	Moldova	1:03.23	
46	7	9	Phạm Thanh Bảo	Vietnam	1:03.37	
47	2	2	Tasi Limtiaco	Micronesia	1:03.53	NR
48	3	1	Daniils Bobrovs	Latvia	1:03.70	
49	3	0	Adrian Robinson	Botswana	1:03.79	
50	3	9	Andres Martijena	Dominican Republic	1:03.80	
51	2	5	Giacomo Casadei	San Marino	1:04.31	
52	3	7	Panayiotis Panaretos	Cyprus	1:04.38	
53	3	8	Jonathan Raharvel	Madagascar	1:04.39	
54	1	4	Ashot Chakhoyan	Armenia	1:04.47	NR
55	2	6	Julio Calero Suarez	Cuba	1:04.51	
56	2	1	Luka Eradze	Georgia	1:04.91	
57	2	7	Luis Sebastian Weekes	Barbados	1:05.15	
58	2	8	Abdulaziz Al-Obaidly	Qatar	1:05.24	
59	2	0	Bransly Dirksz	Aruba	1:05.38	
60	2	9	Jonathan Chung Yee	Mauritius	1:06.05	NR
61	1	0	Abdulla Khalid Jamal	Bahrain	1:06.07	
62	1	9	Osama Trabulsi	Syria	1:07.33	
63	1	6	Micah Masei	American Samoa	1:08.42	
64	1	5	Jayden Loran	Curaçao	1:08.47	
65	1	3	Zach Moyo	Zambia	1:10.10	
66	1	7	Chadd Ng Chiu Ning Ning	Eswatini	1:10.80	
67	1	1	Anthony Deleon Guerrero	Northern Mariana Islands	1:12.66	
68	1	2	Jion Hosei	Palau	1:17.05	
	3	3	Andrew Goh	Malaysia	DSQ	
	6	9	Jaouad Syoud	Algeria	DNS	

=== Semifinals ===
The semifinals were held on 23 July at 20:50.

Rank	Heat	Lane	Name	Nationality	Time	Notes
1	2	4	Qin Haiyang	China	57.82	Q, AS
2	2	5	Lucas Matzerath	Germany	58.75	Q
3	2	3	Nic Fink	United States	58.88	Q
4	2	2	Yan Zibei	China	59.02	Q
5	1	4	Arno Kamminga	Netherlands	59.08	Q
6	1	3	Josh Matheny	United States	59.20	Q
7	1	5	Nicolò Martinenghi	Italy	59.21	Q
8	2	1	Berkay Ömer Öğretir	Turkey	59.50	Q
9	2	6	Federico Poggio	Italy	59.51	
10	1	6	James Wilby	Great Britain	59.54	
11	1	7	Choi Dong-yeol	South Korea	59.59	NR
12	1	8	Zac Stubblety-Cook	Australia	59.69	
13	2	7	Denis Petrashov	Kyrgyzstan	59.78	NR
14	1	2	Andrius Šidlauskas	Lithuania	59.95	
15	1	1	João Gomes Júnior	Brazil	1:00.04	
16	2	8	Bernhard Reitshammer	Austria	1:00.67	

=== Final ===
The final was held on 24 July at 20:02.

Rank	Lane	Name	Nationality	Time	Notes
1st place, gold medalist(s)	4	Qin Haiyang	China	57.69	AS
2nd place, silver medalist(s)	1	Nicolò Martinenghi	Italy	58.72	
2nd place, silver medalist(s)	2	Arno Kamminga	Netherlands	58.72	
2nd place, silver medalist(s)	3	Nic Fink	United States	58.72	
5	5	Lucas Matzerath	Germany	58.88	
6	6	Yan Zibei	China	59.23	
7	7	Josh Matheny	United States	59.45	
8	8	Berkay Ömer Öğretir	Turkey	59.79	
