= High diving at the 2023 World Aquatics Championships =

- Host city: Fukuoka, Japan
- Date(s): 25–27 July
- Venue(s): Seaside Momochi Beach Park
- Events: 2

The high diving events at the 2023 World Aquatics Championships were held from 25 to 27 July 2023 at the Seaside Momochi Beach Park in Fukuoka, Japan.

== Schedule ==
Two events were held.

All times are local (UTC+9).

| Date | Time | Event |
|---|---|---|
| 25 July 2023 | 11:30 | Women Rounds 1–2 |
| 25 July 2023 | 14:00 | Men Rounds 1–2 |
| 26 July 2023 | 12:00 | Women Rounds 3–4 |
| 27 July 2023 | 12:00 | Men Rounds 3–4 |

== Medal summary ==
=== Medal table ===
* Host nation (Japan)

| Rank | Nation | Gold | Silver | Bronze | Total |
|---|---|---|---|---|---|
| 1 | Romania | 1 | 1 | 0 | 2 |
| 2 | Australia | 1 | 0 | 0 | 1 |
| 3 | Canada | 0 | 1 | 1 | 2 |
| 4 | France | 0 | 0 | 1 | 1 |
| Totals (4 entries) | | 2 | 2 | 2 | 6 |

=== Medal events ===
| Event | Gold | | Silver | | Bronze | |
|---|---|---|---|---|---|---|
| Men | Constantin Popovici; Romania | 472.80 | Cătălin Preda; Romania | 438.45 | Gary Hunt; France | 426.30 |
| Women | Rhiannan Iffland; Australia | 357.40 | Molly Carlson; Canada | 322.80 | Jessica Macaulay; Canada | 320.95 |
