= Slovakia at the 2015 World Aquatics Championships =

- Flag of Slovakia
- World Aquatics code: SVK
- National federation: Slovenská Plavecká Federácia
- Website: www.swimmsvk.sk

in Kazan, Russia
- Competitors: 10 in 3 sports
- Medals: Gold 0 Silver 0 Bronze 0 Total 0

World Aquatics Championships appearances
- 1994; 1998; 2001; 2003; 2005; 2007; 2009; 2011; 2013; 2015; 2017; 2019; 2022; 2023; 2024; 2025

Other related appearances
- Czechoslovakia (1973–1991)

Slovakia competed at the 2015 World Aquatics Championships in Kazan, Russia from 24 July to 9 August 2015.

== Open water swimming ==
Slovakia has qualified one swimmer to compete in the open water marathon.

Athlete	Event	Time	Rank
Marek Pavúk	Men's 5 km	1:02:49.4	45
Marek Pavúk	Men's 10 km	2:16:37.0	68

== Swimming ==
Slovak swimmers have achieved qualifying standards in the following events (up to a maximum of 2 swimmers in each event at the A-standard entry time, and 1 at the B-standard):

Men

Athlete	Event	Heat		Semifinal		Final	
Athlete	Event	Time	Rank	Time	Rank	Time	Rank
Marek Botík	50 m breaststroke	28.26	33	did not advance			
Tomáš Klobučník	100 m breaststroke	1:00.77	23	did not advance			
Tomáš Klobučník	200 m breaststroke	2:12.74	24	did not advance			
Richárd Nagy	400 m freestyle	3:51.63	32	—N/a		did not advance	
Richárd Nagy	800 m freestyle	7:55.31	18	—N/a		did not advance	
Richárd Nagy	1500 m freestyle	15:04.03	13	—N/a		did not advance	
Richárd Nagy	400 m individual medley	4:16.37 NR	12	—N/a		did not advance	

Women

Athlete	Event	Heat		Semifinal		Final	
Athlete	Event	Time	Rank	Time	Rank	Time	Rank
Lucia Ledererová	50 m breaststroke	32.20	=38	did not advance			
Katarína Listopadová	200 m freestyle	2:00.69	29	did not advance			
Katarína Listopadová	50 m backstroke	28.63	18	did not advance			
Katarína Listopadová	100 m backstroke	1:01.61	28	did not advance			
Katarína Listopadová	50 m butterfly	26.84	24	did not advance			
Katarína Listopadová	100 m butterfly	58.87	22	did not advance			
Miroslava Syllabová	50 m freestyle	25.59	31	did not advance			
Miroslava Syllabová	100 m freestyle	55.60	29	did not advance			
Karin Tomečková	200 m backstroke	2:16.63	33	did not advance			

== Synchronized swimming ==
Slovakia has qualified synchronized swimmers to compete in each of the following events.

Athlete	Event	Preliminaries		Final	
Athlete	Event	Points	Rank	Points	Rank
Naďa Daabousová; Jana Labáthová	Duet technical routine	77.9122	21	did not advance	
Naďa Daabousová; Jana Labáthová	Duet free routine	76.9333	23	did not advance	
