= Slovakia at the 2017 World Aquatics Championships =

- Flag of Slovakia
- World Aquatics code: SVK
- National federation: Slovenská Plavecká Federácia
- Website: www.swimmsvk.sk

in Budapest, Hungary
- Competitors: 21 in 3 sports
- Medals: Gold 0 Silver 0 Bronze 0 Total 0

World Aquatics Championships appearances
- 1994; 1998; 2001; 2003; 2005; 2007; 2009; 2011; 2013; 2015; 2017; 2019; 2022; 2023; 2024; 2025

Other related appearances
- Czechoslovakia (1973–1991)

Slovakia is scheduled to compete at the 2017 World Aquatics Championships in Budapest, Hungary from 14 July to 30 July.

== Open water swimming ==
Slovakia has entered three open water swimmers

Athlete	Event	Time	Rank
Peter Gutyan	Men's 5 km	1:00:24.5	54
Peter Gutyan	Men's 10 km	2:06:07.0	57
Marek Pavuk	Men's 10 km	2:07:14.9	58
Karolína Balážiková	Women's 5 km	1:09:25.0	53
Karolína Balážiková	Women's 10 km	2:26:37.8	56

== Swimming ==
Slovak swimmers have achieved qualifying standards in the following events (up to a maximum of 2 swimmers in each event at the A-standard entry time, and 1 at the B-standard):

Men

Athlete	Event	Heat		Semifinal		Final	
Athlete	Event	Time	Rank	Time	Rank	Time	Rank
Marek Botík	50 m breaststroke	27.92	31	Did not advance			
Tomáš Klobučník	100 m breaststroke	1:00.96	29	Did not advance			
Richárd Nagy	400 m freestyle	3:52.10	26	—N/a		Did not advance	
Richárd Nagy	800 m freestyle	8:01.42	20	—N/a		Did not advance	
Richárd Nagy	200 m individual medley	2:01.78	24	Did not advance			
Richárd Nagy	400 m individual medley	4:15.69	8 Q	—N/a		4:16.33	8

Women

Athlete	Event	Heat		Semifinal		Final	
Athlete	Event	Time	Rank	Time	Rank	Time	Rank
Karolina Hájková	200 m backstroke	2:16.42	25	Did not advance			
Katarína Listopadová	50 m backstroke	28.68	29	Did not advance			
Katarína Listopadová	100 m backstroke	1:02.10	=29	Did not advance			
Barbora Mišendová	50 m butterfly	27.23	32	Did not advance			
Barbora Mišendová	100 m butterfly	1:01.71	34	Did not advance			
Andrea Podmaníková	50 m breaststroke	32.04	28	Did not advance			
Andrea Podmaníková	100 m breaststroke	1:10.13	30	Did not advance			
Andrea Podmaníková	200 m breaststroke	2:32.63	24	Did not advance			
Karolina Hájková; Katarína Listopadová; Barbora Mišendová; Andrea Podmaníková	4×100 m medley relay	4:12.03	15	—N/a		Did not advance	

Mixed

Athlete	Event	Heat		Final	
Athlete	Event	Time	Rank	Time	Rank
Tomáš Klobučník; Richárd Nagy; Katarína Listopadová; Barbora Mišendová	4×100 m freestyle relay	DNS		Did not advance	
Tomáš Klobučník; Richárd Nagy; Katarína Listopadová; Barbora Mišendová	4×100 m medley relay	3:56.78	13	Did not advance	

== Synchronized swimming ==
Slovakia's synchronized swimming team consisted of 11 athletes (11 female).

Women

Athlete	Event	Preliminaries		Final	
Athlete	Event	Points	Rank	Points	Rank
Naďa Daabousová	Solo technical routine	77.1854	15	Did not advance	
Petra Ďurišová; Diana Miškechová; Naďa Daabousová (R)	Duet technical routine	74.6111	29	Did not advance	
Petra Ďurišová; Diana Miškechová; Naďa Daabousová (R)	Duet free routine	75.8000	29	Did not advance	
Zužana Bodíková (R); Naďa Daabousová; Petra Ďurišová; Romana Horská; Kristina Kvasnovska; Laura Lisa; Diana Miškechová; Natalia Pivarčiová; Rebeka Schererová; Sarah Kartousova; Sophia Šuranová (R)	Team technical routine	74.5487	17	Did not advance	
Zužana Bodíková; Naďa Daabousová (R); Petra Ďurišová; Romana Horská; Kristina Kvasnovska; Laura Lisa; Diana Miškechová; Natalia Pivarčiová; Rebeka Schererová Sarah Kartousova; Sophia Šuranová (R)	Team free routine	75.5667	19	Did not advance	
Julia Bacharová; Zužana Bodíková; Naďa Daabousová (R); Petra Ďurišová; Romana Horská; Kristina Kvasnovska; Laura Lisa; Diana Miškechová; Natalia Pivarčiová; Rebeka Schererová; Sophia Šuranová	Free routine combination	75.4667	15	Did not advance	

Legend: (R) = Reserve Athlete
