= Botswana at the 2025 World Aquatics Championships =

- Flag of Botswana
- World Aquatics code: BOT
- National federation: Botswana Swimming Sport Association

in Singapore
- Competitors: 3 in 2 sports
- Medals: Gold 0 Silver 0 Bronze 0 Total 0

World Aquatics Championships appearances
- 1973; 1975; 1978; 1982; 1986; 1991; 1994; 1998; 2001; 2003; 2005; 2007; 2009; 2011; 2013; 2015; 2017; 2019; 2022; 2023; 2024; 2025

Botswana competed at the 2025 World Aquatics Championships in Singapore from July 11 to August 3, 2025.

== Open water swimming ==
Men

Athlete	Event	Time	Rank
Benco Van Rooyen	Men's 5 km	DNF	

== Swimming ==
Botswana swimmers have achieved qualifying standards in the following events.

Men

Athlete	Event	Heat		Semifinal		Final	
Athlete	Event	Time	Rank	Time	Rank	Time	Rank
Adrian Robinson	50 m breaststroke	28.70	56	Did not advance			
Adrian Robinson	100 m breaststroke	1:03.22	51	Did not advance			

Women

Athlete	Event	Heat		Semifinal		Final	
Athlete	Event	Time	Rank	Time	Rank	Time	Rank
Melodi Saleshando	50 m backstroke	31.65	51	Did not advance			
Melodi Saleshando	200 m individual medley	2:41.13	36	Did not advance			
