= Slovakia at the 2025 World Aquatics Championships =

- Flag of Slovakia
- World Aquatics code: SVK
- National federation: Slovak Swimming Federation

in Singapore
- Competitors: 21 in 3 sports
- Medals: Gold 0 Silver 0 Bronze 0 Total 0

World Aquatics Championships appearances
- 1994; 1998; 2001; 2003; 2005; 2007; 2009; 2011; 2013; 2015; 2017; 2019; 2022; 2023; 2024; 2025

Other related appearances
- Czechoslovakia (1973–1991)

Slovakia competed at the 2025 World Aquatics Championships in Singapore from July 11 to August 3, 2025.

== Competitors ==
The following is the list of competitors in the Championships.

Sport	Men	Women	Total
Artistic swimming	0	9	9
Open water swimming	4	0	4
Swimming	5	3	8
Total	9	12	21

== Artistic swimming ==
Women

Athlete	Event	Preliminaries		Final	
Athlete	Event	Points	Rank	Points	Rank
Žofia Strapeková	Solo technical routine	226.9667	17	Did not advance	
Lea Krajčovičová	Solo free routine	204.6238	14	Did not advance	
Lea Krajčovičová; Žofia Strapeková	Duet technical routine	257.8766	15	Did not advance	
Lea Krajčovičová; Žofia Strapeková	Duet free routine	209.5096	19	Did not advance	

Mixed

Athlete	Event	Preliminaries		Final	
Athlete	Event	Points	Rank	Points	Rank
Veronika Ásványiová; Michaela Bernáthovájii; Lea Krajčovičová; Johana Lajčáková; Viktória Reichová; Žofia Strapeková; Isabella Vilímová; Mia Vilímová	Team technical routine	229.8708	15	Did not advance	
Veronika Ásványiová; Michaela Bernáthovájii; Lea Krajčovičová; Johana Lajčáková; Hana Markusová; Viktória Reichová; Žofia Strapeková; Mia Vilímová	Team acrobatic routine	164.8533	19	Did not advance	

== Open water swimming ==
Men

Athlete	Event	Heat		Semi-final		Final	
Athlete	Event	Time	Rank	Time	Rank	Time	Rank
Jakub Gabriel	Men's 3 km knockout sprints	18:23.8	25	Did not advance			
Jakub Gabriel	Men's 10 km	—				2:17:20.4	51
Tomáš Pavelka	Men's 10 km	—				2:17:48.7	53
Tomáš Peciar	Men's 5 km	—				1:07:01.8	62
Richard Urban	Men's 3 km knockout sprints	18:15.9	23	Did not advance			
Richard Urban	Men's 5 km	—				1:04:57.5	61

== Swimming ==
Slovakia entered 8 swimmers.

Men

Athlete	Event	Heat		Semi-final		Final	
Athlete	Event	Time	Rank	Time	Rank	Time	Rank
Matej Duša	50 m freestyle	22.22	30	Did not advance			
Matej Duša	100 m freestyle	51.00	55	Did not advance			
František Jablcnik	200 m freestyle	1:50.21	39	Did not advance			
František Jablcnik	200 m individual medley	2:04.41	35	Did not advance			
Samuel Kostal	100 m butterfly	53.69	43	Did not advance			
Samuel Kostal	200 m butterfly	1:59.42	26	Did not advance			
Richard Nagy	200 m breaststroke	2:20.64	34	Did not advance			
Richard Nagy	400 m individual medley	4:19.69	21	—		Did not advance	
Milan Vojtko	400 m freestyle	3:51.97	31	—		Did not advance	
Milan Vojtko	800 m freestyle	8:02.57	20	—		Did not advance	

Women

Athlete	Event	Heat		Semi-final		Final	
Athlete	Event	Time	Rank	Time	Rank	Time	Rank
Andrea Podmaníková	50 m breaststroke	31.56	29	Did not advance			
Andrea Podmaníková	100 m breaststroke	1:10.35	40	Did not advance			
Tamara Potocká	50 m butterfly	25.63 NR	7 Q	25.86	15	Did not advance	
Tamara Potocká	200 m individual medley	2:12.29 NR; 2:12.99	16 S/off; 2	Did not advance			
Lillian Slušná	50 m freestyle	25.22	24	Did not advance			
Lillian Slušná	100 m freestyle	55.48	30	Did not advance			
