= Slovakia at the 2022 World Aquatics Championships =

- Flag of Slovakia
- World Aquatics code: SVK
- National federation: Slovak Swimming Federation

in Budapest, Hungary
- Competitors: 20 in 3 sports
- Medals: Gold 0 Silver 0 Bronze 0 Total 0

World Aquatics Championships appearances
- 1994; 1998; 2001; 2003; 2005; 2007; 2009; 2011; 2013; 2015; 2017; 2019; 2022; 2023; 2024; 2025

Other related appearances
- Czechoslovakia (1973–1991)

Slovakia competed at the 2022 World Aquatics Championships in Budapest, Hungary from 18 June to 3 July.

== Artistic swimming ==
Slovakia entered 14 artistic swimmers.

Women

Athlete	Event	Preliminaries		Final	
Athlete	Event	Points	Rank	Points	Rank
Chiara Diky	Solo technical routine	77.5403	16	did not advance	
Viktória Reichová	Solo free routine	77.3000	16	did not advance	
Chiara Diky; Nicol Diky; Laura Domčeková; Tereza Ďurišová; Lenka Keprtová; Nina Lukáčová; Linda McDonnell; Laura Waterloos	Team free routine	75.0333	17	did not advance	
Chiara Diky; Nicol Diky; Laura Domčeková; Tereza Ďurišová; Emily Italy; Lenka Keprtová; Nina Lukáčová; Linda McDonnell; Terezia Sabajová; Laura Waterloos	Highlight free routine	77.0667	12 Q	77.2667	12

Mixed

Athlete	Event	Preliminaries		Final	
Athlete	Event	Points	Rank	Points	Rank
Jozef Solymosy; Silvia Solymosyová	Duet technical routine	72.2422	10 Q	73.2881	10
Jozef Solymosy; Silvia Solymosyová	Duet free routine	73.8333	9 Q	75.1000	9

== Open water swimming ==
Slovakia entered 1 open water male swimmers

Men

Athlete	Event	Time	Rank
Tomáš Peciar	5 km	58:20.4	31

== Swimming ==
Slovakia entered 6 swimmers.

Men

Athlete	Event	Heat		Semifinal		Final	
Athlete	Event	Time	Rank	Time	Rank	Time	Rank
Matej Duša	50 m freestyle	22.59	34	did not advance			
Matej Duša	100 m freestyle	50.36	47	did not advance			
Ádám Halás	50 m butterfly	23.94 NR	34	did not advance			
Ádám Halás	100 m butterfly	54.02	40	did not advance			
František Jablčník	200 m freestyle	1:51.25	41	did not advance			
František Jablčník	200 m individual medley	2:05.06	31	did not advance			
Richard Nagy	200 m butterfly	2:00.83	31	did not advance			
Richard Nagy	400 m individual medley	4:20.78	20	—N/a		did not advance	

Women

Athlete	Event	Heat		Semifinal		Final	
Athlete	Event	Time	Rank	Time	Rank	Time	Rank
Tamara Potocká	50 m butterfly	26.82	23	did not advance			
Tamara Potocká	100 m butterfly	1:00.12	18	did not advance			
Nikoleta Trníková	200 m breaststroke	2:29.45	22	did not advance			
Nikoleta Trníková	200 m individual medley	2:17.36	26	did not advance			
Nikoleta Trníková	400 m individual medley	did not start		—N/a		did not advance	

Mixed

Athlete	Event	Heat		Final	
Athlete	Event	Time	Rank	Time	Rank
Tamara Potocká; Nikoleta Trníková; Ádám Halás; Matej Duša	4 × 100 metre medley relay	3:58.67	17	did not advance	
