= Slovakia at the 2013 World Aquatics Championships =

- Flag of Slovakia
- World Aquatics code: SVK
- National federation: Slovenská Plavecká Federácia
- Website: www.swimmsvk.sk

in Barcelona, Spain
- Competitors: 8 in 2 sports
- Medals: Gold 0 Silver 0 Bronze 0 Total 0

World Aquatics Championships appearances
- 1994; 1998; 2001; 2003; 2005; 2007; 2009; 2011; 2013; 2015; 2017; 2019; 2022; 2023; 2024; 2025

Other related appearances
- Czechoslovakia (1973–1991)

Slovakia is competing at the 2013 World Aquatics Championships in Barcelona, Spain between 19 July and 4 August 2013.

== Swimming ==
Slovak swimmers achieved qualifying standards in the following events (up to a maximum of 2 swimmers in each event at the A-standard entry time, and 1 at the B-standard):

Men

Athlete	Event	Heat		Semifinal		Final	
Athlete	Event	Time	Rank	Time	Rank	Time	Rank
Marek Botík	50 m breaststroke	28.39	=43	did not advance			
Tomáš Klobučník	100 m breaststroke	1:01.37	27	did not advance			
Tomáš Klobučník	200 m breaststroke	2:11.00 NR	10 Q	2:11.56	14	did not advance	
Richárd Nagy	400 m freestyle	3:53.10	21	—N/a		did not advance	
Richárd Nagy	800 m freestyle	7:59.69	19	—N/a		did not advance	
Richárd Nagy	1500 m freestyle	15:22.20	20	—N/a		did not advance	
Michal Navara	50 m butterfly	24.54	38	did not advance			

Women

Athlete	Event	Heat		Semifinal		Final	
Athlete	Event	Time	Rank	Time	Rank	Time	Rank
Katarína Listopadová	50 m butterfly	27.32	31	did not advance			
Katarína Listopadová	100 m butterfly	59.34	21	did not advance			
Katarína Listopadová	200 m individual medley	2:17.87	30	did not advance			
Zuzana Mimovičová	50 m breaststroke	32.79	41	did not advance			
Zuzana Mimovičová	100 m breaststroke	1:11.67	41	did not advance			

== Synchronized swimming ==
Slovakia has qualified two synchronized swimmers.

Athlete	Event	Preliminaries		Final	
Athlete	Event	Points	Rank	Points	Rank
Jana Labáthová	Solo free routine	77.520	21	did not advance	
Jana Labáthová	Solo technical routine	78.800	18	did not advance	
Kristína Krajčovičová; Jana Labáthová	Duet free routine	76.350	21	did not advance	
Kristína Krajčovičová; Jana Labáthová	Duet technical routine	77.100	20	did not advance	

== See also ==
Slovakia at other World Championships in 2013

- Slovakia at the 2013 UCI Road World Championships
- Slovakia at the 2013 World Championships in Athletics
