= Slovakia at the 2023 World Aquatics Championships =

- Flag of Slovakia
- World Aquatics code: SVK
- National federation: Slovak Swimming Federation

in Fukuoka, Japan
- Competitors: 18 in 3 sports
- Medals: Gold 0 Silver 0 Bronze 0 Total 0

World Aquatics Championships appearances
- 1994; 1998; 2001; 2003; 2005; 2007; 2009; 2011; 2013; 2015; 2017; 2019; 2022; 2023; 2024; 2025

Other related appearances
- Czechoslovakia (1973–1991)

Slovakia competed at the 2023 World Aquatics Championships in Fukuoka, Japan from 14 to 30 July.

== Artistic swimming ==
Women

Athlete	Event	Preliminaries		Final	
Athlete	Event	Points	Rank	Points	Rank
Viktória Reichová	Solo technical routine	181.4233	13	Did not advance	
Viktória Reichová	Solo free routine	135.4375	16	Did not advance	
Chiara Diky; Lea Anna Krajčovičová	Duet technical routine	186.5100	20	Did not advance	

Mixed

Athlete	Event	Preliminaries		Final	
Athlete	Event	Points	Rank	Points	Rank
Veronika Ásványiová; Michaela Bernátová; Chiara Diky; Lea Anna Krajčovičová; Hana Markusová; Linda McDonnell; Žofia Strapeková; Lisa Zemanová	Team technical routine	180.9629	16	Did not advance	
Veronika Ásványiová; Michaela Bernátová; Chiara Diky; Lea Anna Krajčovičová; Johana Lajčáková; Linda McDonnell; Žofia Strapeková; Lisa Zemanová	Team free routine	188.0291	13	Did not advance	

== Open water swimming ==
Slovakia entered 1 open water swimmer.

Men

Athlete	Event	Time	Rank
Tomáš Peciar	Men's 5 km	59:41.7	41
Tomáš Peciar	Men's 10 km	2:04:22.2	49

== Swimming ==
Slovakia entered 7 swimmers.

Men

Athlete	Event	Heat		Semifinal		Final	
Athlete	Event	Time	Rank	Time	Rank	Time	Rank
Matej Duša	50 metre freestyle	22.53	41	Did not advance			
Matej Duša	100 metre freestyle	50.34	50	Did not advance			
František Jablčník	200 metre freestyle	1:50.61	37	Did not advance			
František Jablčník	200 metre individual medley	2:03.89	32	Did not advance			
Richard Nagy	200 metre butterfly	2:03.33	30	Did not advance			
Richard Nagy	400 metre individual medley	4:22.96	22	—N/a		Did not advance	
Tibor Tistan	50 metre butterfly	23.75	33	Did not advance			
Tibor Tistan	100 metre butterfly	54.30	47	Did not advance			

Women

Athlete	Event	Heat		Semifinal		Final	
Athlete	Event	Time	Rank	Time	Rank	Time	Rank
Teresa Ivan	50 metre freestyle	25.39	24	Did not advance			
Teresa Ivan	100 metre freestyle	56.16	30	Did not advance			
Andrea Podmaníková	50 metre breaststroke	31.43 NR	26	Did not advance			
Andrea Podmaníková	100 metre breaststroke	1:09.39	34	Did not advance			
Tamara Potocká	50 metre butterfly	26.55	22	Did not advance			
Tamara Potocká	200 metre individual medley	2:15.41	24	Did not advance			

Mixed

Athlete	Event	Heat		Final	
Athlete	Event	Time	Rank	Time	Rank
Matej Duša; František Jablčník; Tamara Potocká; Teresa Ivan	4 × 100 m freestyle relay	3:31.41	21	Did not advance	
Teresa Ivan; František Jablčník; Andrea Podmaníková; Matej Duša	4 × 100 m medley relay	4:01.69	23	Did not advance	
