= Slovakia at the 2024 World Aquatics Championships =

- Flag of Slovakia
- FINA code: SVK
- National federation: Slovak Swimming Federation

in Doha, Qatar
- Competitors: 22 in 3 sports
- Medals: Gold 0 Silver 0 Bronze 0 Total 0

World Aquatics Championships appearances
- 1994; 1998; 2001; 2003; 2005; 2007; 2009; 2011; 2013; 2015; 2017; 2019; 2022; 2023; 2024

Other related appearances
- Czechoslovakia (1973–1991)

Slovakia competed at the 2024 World Aquatics Championships in Doha, Qatar from 2 to 18 February.

== Competitors ==
The following is the list of competitors in the Championships.

Sport	Men	Women	Total
Artistic swimming	0	9	9
Open water swimming	2	2	4
Swimming	5	4	9
Total	7	15	22

== Artistic swimming ==
Women

Athlete	Event	Preliminaries		Final	
Athlete	Event	Points	Rank	Points	Rank
Viktória Reichová	Solo technical routine	216.1600	14	Did not advance	
Viktória Reichová	Solo free routine	207.7917	8 Q	195.2249	11
Chiara Diky; Lea Anna Krajčovičová	Duet technical routine	213.9150	18	Did not advance	
Chiara Diky; Lea Anna Krajčovičová	Duet free routine	177.6645	18	Did not advance	

Mixed

Athlete	Event	Preliminaries		Final	
Athlete	Event	Points	Rank	Points	Rank
Veronika Ásványiová; Michaela Bernáthová; Chiara Diky; Lea Anna Krajčovičová; Hana Markusová; Viktória Reichová; Žofia Strapeková; Lisa Zemanová	Team technical routine	201.9179	11 Q	201.5421	11
Veronika Ásványiová; Michaela Bernáthová; Chiara Diky; Lea Anna Krajčovičová; Hana Markusová; Viktória Reichová; Žofia Strapeková; Lisa Zemanová	Team free routine	196.4710	13	Did not advance	
Veronika Ásványiová; Michaela Bernáthová; Chiara Diky; Lea Anna Krajčovičová; Johana Lajčáková; Viktória Reichová; Žofia Strapeková; Lisa Zemanová	Team technical routine	172.2900	116	Did not advance	

== Open water swimming ==
Men

Athlete	Event	Time	Rank
Tomáš Peciar	Men's 5 km	55:14.4	42
Richard Urban	Men's 5 km	57:06.0	57

Mixed

Athlete	Event	Time	Rank
Tomáš Peciar; Karolína Valko; Lucia Slámová; Richard Urban	Team relay	1:11:56.6	21

== Swimming ==
Slovakia entered 9 swimmers.

Men

Athlete	Event	Heat		Semifinal		Final	
Athlete	Event	Time	Rank	Time	Rank	Time	Rank
Matej Duša	50 metre freestyle	22.12 NR	16 Q	22.11 NR	16	Did not advance	
Matej Duša	100 metre freestyle	49.12 NR	21	Did not advance			
František Jablcnik	200 metre freestyle	1:50.88	37	Did not advance			
Samuel Kostal	400 metre freestyle	3:54.78	34	—		Did not advance	
Samuel Kostal	200 metre butterfly	1:59.90	26	Did not advance			
Richard Nagy	200 metre individual medley	2:02.89	22	Did not advance			
Richard Nagy	400 metre individual medley	4:20.76	13	—		Did not advance	
Tibor Tistan	50 metre butterfly	23.65 NR	23	Did not advance			
Tibor Tistan	100 metre butterfly	55.27	43	Did not advance			
Tibor Tistan; Matej Duša; Richard Nagy; Frantisek Jablcnik	4 × 100 m freestyle relay	3:24.70 NR	17	—		Did not advance	

Women

Athlete	Event	Heat		Semifinal		Final	
Athlete	Event	Time	Rank	Time	Rank	Time	Rank
Teresa Ivan	50 metre freestyle	25.40	18	Did not advance			
Teresa Ivan	50 metre backstroke	28.90	22	Did not advance			
Tamara Potocká	50 metre butterfly	Disqualified		Did not advance			
Tamara Potocká	200 metre individual medley	2:15.69	16 Q	2:15.36	15	Did not advance	
Lillian Slušná	100 metre freestyle	56.01	23	Did not advance			
Nikoleta Trníková	200 metre breaststroke	2:31.52	21	Did not advance			
Nikoleta Trníková	400 metre individual medley	Did not start		Did not advance			

Mixed

Athlete	Event	Heat		Semifinal		Final	
Athlete	Event	Time	Rank	Time	Rank	Time	Rank
Matej Duša; Tibor Tistan; Lillian Slušná; Teresa Ivan	4 × 100 m freestyle relay	3:31.67	7 Q	—		3:29.88 NR	7
Teresa Ivan; František Jablčník; Tibor Tišťan; Tamara Potocká	4 × 100 m medley relay	3:57.84	18	—		Did not advance	
