= Slovakia at the 2019 World Aquatics Championships =

- Flag of Slovakia
- FINA code: SVK
- National federation: Slovak Swimming Federation
- Website: swimmsvk.sk (in Slovak)

World Aquatics Championships appearances
- 1994; 1998; 2001; 2003; 2005; 2007; 2009; 2011; 2013; 2015; 2017; 2019; 2022; 2023; 2024

Other related appearances
- Czechoslovakia (1973–1991)

Slovakia competed at the 2019 World Aquatics Championships in Gwangju, South Korea from 12 to 28 July.

== Artistic swimming ==
Slovakia's artistic swimming team consisted of 12 athletes (12 female).

Women

Athlete	Event	Preliminaries		Final	
Athlete	Event	Points	Rank	Points	Rank
Nada Daabousová	Solo technical routine	71.3210	22	Did not advance	
Nada Daabousová	Solo free routine	78.1667	19	Did not advance	
Nada Daabousová; Diana Miškechová	Duet technical routine	76.6795	24	Did not advance	
Nada Daabousová; Chiara Diky	Duet free routine	77.1333	24	Did not advance	
Hana Bartovičová; Chiara Diky; Anastasia Iakovlev; Laura Lisá; Linda McDonnell; Diana Miškechová; Barbora Novotná; Rebecca Slezáková; Júlia Bacharová (R); Viktória Riegerová (R)	Team free routine	75.3333	21	Did not advance	
Hana Bartovičová; Nada Daabousová; Chiara Diky; Anastasia Iakovlev; Laura Lisá; Linda McDonnell; Diana Miškechová; Barbora Novotná; Viktória Riegerová; Rebecca Slezáková; Júlia Bacharová (R); Silvia Solymosyová (R)	Free routine combination	76.7000	13	Did not advance	

Legend: (R) = Reserve Athlete

== Open water swimming ==
Slovakia qualified one male and one female open water swimmers.

Men

Athlete	Event	Time	Rank
Tomáš Peciar	Men's 5 km	54:00.7	40
Tomáš Peciar	Men's 10 km	2:00:24.2	64

Women

Athlete	Event	Time	Rank
Karolína Balážiková	Women's 5 km	1:01:40.6	40
Karolína Balážiková	Women's 10 km	2:07:38.7	50
Karolína Balážiková	Women's 25 km	DNF	

== Swimming ==
Slovakia entered four swimmers.

Men

Athlete	Event	Heat		Semifinal		Final	
Athlete	Event	Time	Rank	Time	Rank	Time	Rank
Tomáš Klobučník	50 m breaststroke	28.20	38	Did not advance			
Tomáš Klobučník	100 m breaststroke	1:01.65	35	Did not advance			
Tomáš Klobučník	200 m breaststroke	2:13.97	34	Did not advance			
Richard Nagy	400 m freestyle	3:53.38	26	—		Did not advance	
Richard Nagy	800 m freestyle	DNS		—		Did not advance	
Richard Nagy	200 m butterfly	1:59.29	28	Did not advance			
Richard Nagy	400 m individual medley	DSQ		—		Did not advance	
Vladimír Štefánik	50 m freestyle	23.06	52	Did not advance			
Vladimír Štefánik	100 m freestyle	50.27	49	Did not advance			
Vladimír Štefánik	50 m butterfly	24.47	42	Did not advance			

Women

Athlete	Event	Heat		Semifinal		Final	
Athlete	Event	Time	Rank	Time	Rank	Time	Rank
Karolina Hájková	50 m backstroke	0:29.04	25	Did not advance			
Karolina Hájková	100 m backstroke	1:03.26	41	Did not advance			
Karolina Hájková	200 m backstroke	DNS		Did not advance			
