= List of Botswana records in swimming =

The Botswana records in swimming are the fastest ever performances of swimmers from Botswana, which are recognised and ratified by the Botswana Swimming Sport Association.

All records were set in finals unless noted otherwise.

== Long Course (50 m) ==
=== Men ===
Event	Time		Name	Club	Date	Meet	Location	Ref
50 m freestyle	23.98	h	James Freeman	Tuks	15 December 2019	Swim Cup Amsterdam	Amsterdam, Netherlands	
100 m freestyle	51.31	h	James Freeman	Minnesota Golden Gophers	14 July 2022	Speedo Championship Series	Minneapolis, United States	
200 m freestyle	1:50.63	h	James Freeman	Botswana	30 July 2022	Commonwealth Games	Birmingham, Great Britain	
400 m freestyle	3:53.18		James Freeman	AGC-tshwane	11 April 2019	South African Championships	Durban, South Africa	
800 m freestyle	8:07.67		James Freeman	AGC-tshwane	12 April 2019	South African Championships	Durban, South Africa	
1500 m freestyle	15:38.28		James Freeman	Tuks	23 March 2019	SA National JNR Age Group Champs	Durban, South Africa	
50 m backstroke	26.88	h	David van der Colff	Botswana	8 August 2015	World Championships	Kazan, Russia	
100 m backstroke	57.74		David van der Colff	Northern Tigers Swimming	12 April 2016	South African Championships	Durban, South Africa	
200 m backstroke	2:07.15	sf	David van der Colff	Northern Tigers Swimming	14 April 2016	South African Championships	Durban, South Africa	
50 m breaststroke	27.87	h	Adrian Robinson	Botswana	26 July 2026	Commonwealth Games	Glasgow, United Kingdom	
100 m breaststroke	1:01.65	h	Adrian Robinson	Botswana	24 July 2026	Commonwealth Games	Glasgow, United Kingdom	
200 m breaststroke	2:23.81		Khalil Sethi	Phoenix Swimming	20 March 2026	SA National Youth Championships	Port Elizabeth, South Africa	
50 m butterfly	25.50		James Freeman	AGC-tshwane	9 April 2018	South African Championships	Durban, South Africa	
100 m butterfly	56.24	b	James Freeman	Tuks	15 December 2019	Swim Cup Amsterdam	Amsterdam, Netherlands	
200 m butterfly	2:10.52	h	James Freeman	Botswana	22 July 2017	Commonwealth Youth Games	Nassau, Bahamas	
200 m individual medley	2:10.82	h	James Freeman	Botswana	22 July 2017	Commonwealth Youth Games	Nassau, Bahamas	
400 m individual medley	4:36.91	h	James Freeman	Botswana	20 July 2017	Commonwealth Youth Games	Nassau, Bahamas	
4×100 m freestyle relay	3:41.39		Andile Bekker; Solomon Dzingai; Brandon Rouse; James Freeman	Botswana	21 February 2020	CANA Zone IV Championships	Gaborone, Botswana	
4×200 m freestyle relay								
4×100 m medley relay	4:06.01	h	Ntsika Mothibatsela (1:05.23); Khalil Sethi (1:09.04); Gaamangwe Keitsile (1:00.26); Ray Khonat (51.48)	Botswana	24 August 2025	World Junior Championships	Otopeni, Romania	

Legend: # – Record awaiting ratification by Botswana Swimming Sport Association; WR – World record; AF – African record; e – equalled existing record;
Records not set in finals: h – heat; sf – semifinal; r – relay 1st leg; rh – relay heat 1st leg; b – B final; † – en route to final mark; so – swim-off; tt – time trial

=== Women ===
Event	Time		Name	Club	Date	Meet	Location	Ref
50m freestyle	26.07	h	Naomi Ruele	Botswana	20 March 2016	NCCA Division I Championships	Atlanta, United States	
100m freestyle	57.37		Maxine Egner	Väsby Simsällskap	25 September 2022	Swedish Swim Games	Upplands Väsby, Sweden	
200m freestyle	2:07.62		Maxine Egner	Väsby Simsällskap	23 September 2022	Swedish Swim Games	Upplands Väsby, Sweden	
400m freestyle	4:37.51	h	Maxine Egner	Botswana	3 April 2022	Bergen Swim Festival	Bergen, Norway	
800m freestyle	10:01.28		Maxine Egner	Väsby Simsällskap	13 May 2022	Distriktstandvården Neptuniaden	Stockholm, Sweden	
1500m freestyle	20:36.85		Amaru Ditlhogo	-				
50m backstroke	29.17	sf	Naomi Ruele	Botswana	9 April 2018	Commonwealth Games	Gold Coast, Australia	
100m backstroke	1:02.58	h	Naomi Ruele	Botswana	6 April 2018	Commonwealth Games	Gold Coast, Australia	
200m backstroke	2:33.94	h	Naya Hughes	Botswana	31 October 2020	CANA Zone V Virtual Age Group Championships	Gaborone, Botswana	
50m breaststroke	34.36	h	Chang Yun-Suh	Botswana	19 August 2025	World Junior Championships	Otopeni, Romania	
100m breaststroke	1:20.53	h	Bonita Imsirovic	Botswana	9 September 2015	African Games	Brazzaville, Congo	
200m breaststroke	2:51.41	h	Bonita Imsirovic	Botswana	7 September 2015	African Games	Brazzaville, Congo	
50m butterfly	28.45	h	Maxine Egner	Botswana	10 March 2024	African Games	Accra, Ghana	
100m butterfly	1:05.75		Maxine Egner	Darrell Morton's School Of Swimming Gators	23 March 2023	Botswana National Championships	Gaborone, Botswana	
200m butterfly	2:44.70		Kimberly Ingwe	-				
200m individual medley	2:36.03		Maxine Egner	Väsby Simsällskap	5 June 2022	TYR Invite Täby Sim	Stockholm, Sweden	
400m individual medley	5:54.46		Maxine Egner	Darrell Morton's School Of Swimming Gators	4 April 2019	DMSS Gators Swim Gala	Gaborone, Botswana	
4×100m freestyle relay	4:19.09		Caitlin Loo; Tselane Matthews; Bupe Ruele; Maxine Egner	Botswana	21 February 2020	CANA Zone IV Championships	Gaborone, Botswana	
4×200m freestyle relay								
4×100m medley relay	5:16.67			Botswana	8 December 2018	AUSC Region 5 Under 20 Youth Games	Botswana	

Legend: # – Record awaiting ratification by Botswana Swimming Sport Association; WR – World record; AF – African record; e – equalled existing record;
Records not set in finals: h – heat; sf – semifinal; r – relay 1st leg; rh – relay heat 1st leg; b – B final; † – en route to final mark; so – swim-off; tt – time trial

=== Mixed relay ===
Event	Time		Name	Club	Date	Meet	Location	Ref
4×100 m freestyle relay	3:54.15	h	Maxine Egner (58.44); Kyra Harry (1:04.62); Andile Bekker (54.78); Adrian Robinson (56.31)	Botswana	9 March 2024	African Games	Accra, Ghana	
4×100 m medley relay	4:15.65	h	Naomi Ruele (1:03.42); Adrian Robinson (1:04.70); Caitlin Loo (1:11.82); Kitso Matija (55.71)	Botswana	22 August 2019	African Games	Casablanca, Morocco	

Legend: # – Record awaiting ratification by Botswana Swimming Sport Association; WR – World record; AF – African record; e – equalled existing record;
Records not set in finals: h – heat; sf – semifinal; r – relay 1st leg; rh – relay heat 1st leg; b – B final; † – en route to final mark; so – swim-off; tt – time trial

== Short Course (25 m) ==
=== Men ===
Event	Time		Name	Club	Date	Meet	Location	Ref
50 m freestyle	22.95		James Freeman	Tuks Aquatics Club	27 October 2020	South African Championships	Pietermaritzburg, South Africa	
100 m freestyle	48.96	h	Rayhan Khonat	Botswana	2 October 2026	World Cup	Baku, Azerbaijan	
200 m freestyle	1:47.79	h	Rayhan Khonat	Botswana	3 October 2026	World Cup	Baku, Azerbaijan	
400 m freestyle	3:55.08		Rayhan Khonat	Botswana	3 October 2026	World Cup	Baku, Azerbaijan	
800 m freestyle								
1500 m freestyle								
50 m backstroke	25.99	h	David Van der Colff	Botswana	5 December 2014	World Championships	Doha, Qatar	
100 m backstroke	55.37	h	David Van der Colff	Botswana	3 December 2014	World Championships	Doha, Qatar	
200 m backstroke	2:07.90		David van der Colff	Tuks Aquatics Club	10 August 2014	South African Championships	Durban, South Africa	
50 m breaststroke	27.52	h	Adrian Robinson	Botswana	14 December 2024	World Championships	Budapest, Hungary	
100 m breaststroke	1:00.68	h	Adrian Robinson	Botswana	11 December 2024	World Championships	Budapest, Hungary	
200 m breaststroke	2:23.11	h	Adrian Robinson	Aqua Development	8 November 2024	Hungarian Championships	Kaposvár, Hungary	
200 m breaststroke	2:17.64	h, #	Mmusi Matthews	Botswana	8 July 2025	AUSC Region 5 Games	Swakopmund, Namibia	
50 m butterfly	24.99		James Freeman	Tuks Aquatics Club	26 October 2020	South African Championships	Pietermaritzburg, South Africa	
100 m butterfly	56.08		James Freeman	Tuks	17 June 2019	Tuks Open	Johannesburg, South Africa	
200 m butterfly								
100 m individual medley	59.33	h	David Van der Colff	Botswana	6 December 2014	World Championships	Doha, Qatar	
200 m individual medley	2:06.93		Rayhan Khonat	Botswana	7 July 2025	Region 5 Games	Swakopmund, Namibia	
400 m individual medley								
4×50 m freestyle relay								
4×100 m freestyle relay								
4×200 m freestyle relay								
4×50 m medley relay								
4×100 m medley relay								

Legend: # – Record awaiting ratification by Botswana Swimming Sport Association; WR – World record; AF – African record; e – equalled existing record;
Records not set in finals: h – heat; sf – semifinal; r – relay 1st leg; rh – relay heat 1st leg; b – B final; † – en route to final mark; so – swim-off; tt – time trial

=== Women ===
Event	Time		Name	Club	Date	Meet	Location	Ref
50 m freestyle	25.42	h	Naomi Ruele	Botswana	11 December 2016	World Championships	Windsor, Canada	
100 m freestyle	56.23	h	Maxine Egner	Väsby Simsällskap	27 November 2022	Swedish Championships	Stockholm, Sweden	
200 m freestyle	2:04.16		Maxine Egner	Väsby Simsällskap	25 November 2022	Swedish Championships	Stockholm, Sweden	
400 m freestyle	4:28.14	h	Maxine Egner	Väsby Simsällskap	25 November 2021	Swedish Championships	Stockholm, Sweden	
800 m freestyle	9:29.49		Maxine Egner	Väsby Simsällskap	23 October 2021	DM	Sweden	
1500 m freestyle								
50m backstroke	27.94	h	Naomi Ruele	Botswana	9 December 2016	World Championships	Windsor, Canada	
100m backstroke	1:07.59	h	Naomi Ruele	Botswana	12 December 2012	World Championships	Istanbul, Turkey	
200m backstroke								
50m breaststroke	33.49		Chang Yun-Suh	Botswana	6 July 2025	Region 5 Games	Swakopmund, Namibia	
100m breaststroke	1:14.33		Chang Yun-Suh	Botswana	5 September 2025	African Zone IV Championships	Manzini, Eswatini	
200m breaststroke	2:49.89		Chang Yun-Suh	Botswana	7 July 2025	Region 5 Games	Swakopmund, Namibia	
50m butterfly	27.69	h, so	Maxine Egner	Väsby Simsällskap	23 November 2022	Swedish Championships	Stockholm, Sweden	
100m butterfly	1:03.49	h	Maxine Egner	Väsby Simsällskap	29 October 2022	YSTAD Grand Prix 2	Sweden	
200m butterfly								
100m individual medley	1:08.45	h	Maxine Egner	Väsby Simsällskap	9 October 2022	Polisen Head to Head	Sweden	
200m individual medley	2:24.23		Maxine Egner	Väsby Simsällskap	23 October 2022	DM	Sweden	
400m individual medley								
4×50m freestyle relay	1:58.94			Botswana	March 2018	CANA Zone IV Championships	Malawi	
4×100m freestyle relay	4:22.86			Botswana	March 2018	CANA Zone IV Championships	Malawi	
4×200m freestyle relay								
4×50m medley relay	2:17.44			Botswana	March 2018	CANA Zone IV Championships	Malawi	
4×100m medley relay								

Legend: # – Record awaiting ratification by Botswana Swimming Sport Association; WR – World record; AF – African record; e – equalled existing record;
Records not set in finals: h – heat; sf – semifinal; r – relay 1st leg; rh – relay heat 1st leg; b – B final; † – en route to final mark; so – swim-off; tt – time trial
