= Botswana at the 2017 World Aquatics Championships =

- Flag of Botswana
- World Aquatics code: BOT
- National federation: Botswana Swimming Sport Association

in Budapest, Hungary
- Competitors: 3 in 1 sport
- Medals: Gold 0 Silver 0 Bronze 0 Total 0

World Aquatics Championships appearances
- 1973; 1975; 1978; 1982; 1986; 1991; 1994; 1998; 2001; 2003; 2005; 2007; 2009; 2011; 2013; 2015; 2017; 2019; 2022; 2023; 2024; 2025

Botswana competed at the 2017 World Aquatics Championships in Budapest,Hungary from 14 July to 30 July.

== Swimming ==
Botswana received a Universality invitation from FINA to send three swimmers (two men and one woman) to the World Championships.

Athlete	Event	Heat		Semifinal		Final	
Athlete	Event	Time	Rank	Time	Rank	Time	Rank
Adrian Robinson	Men's 100 m freestyle	56.01	91	did not advance			
Adrian Robinson	Men's 50 m breaststroke	30.38	61	did not advance			
David van der Colff	Men's 50 m backstroke	27.67	44	did not advance			
David van der Colff	Men's 100 m backstroke	1:00.56	44	did not advance			
Naomi Ruele	Women's 50 m backstroke	29.21	35	did not advance			
Naomi Ruele	Women's 100 m backstroke	1:02.96	36	did not advance			
