= List of Slovak records in swimming =

Slovak records in swimming are the fastest ever performances of swimmers from Slovakia, which are recognised and ratified by the Slovak Swimming Federation (Slovenská plavecká federácia).

All records were set in finals unless noted otherwise.

== Long Course (50 m) ==
=== Men ===
Event	Time		Name	Club	Date	Meet	Location	Ref
50 m freestyle	21.87		Matej Duša	Team Charlotte	12 July 2026	North Carolina Senior Championships	Cary, United States	
100 m freestyle	49.12	h	Matej Duša	Slovakia	14 February 2024	World Championships	Doha, Qatar	
200 m freestyle	1:47.26	rh	Samuel Košťál	Slovakia	10 August 2026	European Championships	Paris, France	
400 m freestyle	3:49.95		Milan Vojtko	Slovakia	6 July 2025	European Junior Championships	Šamorín, Slovakia	
800 m freestyle	7:55.31	h	Richard Nagy	Slovakia	4 August 2015	World Championships	Kazan, Russia	
1500 m freestyle	15:04.03	h	Richard Nagy	Slovakia	8 August 2015	World Championships	Kazan, Russia	
50m backstroke	25.44		Ľuboš Križko	Slovakia	21 March 2008	European Championships	Eindhoven, Netherlands	
100m backstroke	54.07	h	Ľuboš Križko	Slovakia	10 August 2008	Olympic Games	Beijing, China	
200m backstroke	1:58.24	h	Martin Perecinsky	Long Island Aquatics Club	19 June 2024	U.S. Olympic Trials	Indianapolis, United States	
50m breaststroke	27.56		Leonardo Bergomi	Canottieri Baldesio	6 August 2026	Italian Category Championships	Rome, Italy	
100m breaststroke	1:00.43	h	Tomáš Klobučník	Slovakia	17 May 2021	European Championships	Budapest, Hungary	
200m breaststroke	2:11.00	h	Tomáš Klobučník	Slovakia	1 August 2013	World Championships	Barcelona, Spain	
50m butterfly	23.50		Tibor Tišťan	Plavecký oddiel Ružomberok	27 May 2024	AP Race London International	London, United Kingdom	
100m butterfly	53.57		Adam Halas	Slovakia	25 April 2021	Graz Trophy	Graz, Austria	
200m butterfly	1:57.26	h	Samuel Košťál	Slovakia	30 May 2024	Mare Nostrum	Barcelona, Spain	
200m individual medley	2:01.63	h	Samuel Košťál	Slovakia	15 August 2026	European Championships	Paris, France	
400m individual medley	4:13.87	h	Richard Nagy	Slovakia	6 August 2016	Olympic Games	Rio de Janeiro, Brazil	
4×100m freestyle relay	3:25.99	national, h	Adam Halas (51.76); Matej Duša (49.64); Jakub Poliacik (52.17); Alex Kusik (52.42)	Slovakia	17 May 2021	European Championships	Budapest, Hungary	
4×100m freestyle relay	3:24.70	national, h, #	Tibor Tišťan (50.82); Matej Duša (50.35); Richard Nagy (52.29); Frantisek Jablcnik (51.24)	Slovakia	11 February 2024	World Championships	Doha, Qatar	
4×100m freestyle relay	3:24.30	club	Matej Duša (50.65); Ondrej Duša (52.29); Jakub Poliacik (50.86); Radoslav Polčič (50.50)	XBS Swimming	27 May 2023	Grand Prix Slovakia	Šamorín, Slovakia	
4×200m freestyle relay	7:26.09		Samuel Kostal (1:50.91); Matej Martinovic (1:50.00); Richard Pucek (1:54.21); Milan Vojtko (1:50.97)	Slovakia	6 July 2024	European Junior Championships	Vilnius, Lithuania	
4×200m freestyle relay	7:16.26	h, #	Samuel Kostal (1:47.26); Frantisek Jablcnik (1:50.25); Milan Vojtko (1:49.08); Jakub Poliačik (1:49.67)	Slovakia	10 August 2026	European Championships	Paris, France	
4×100m medley relay	3:44.62	h	Alex Kušík (58.43); Tomáš Klobučník (1:02.22); Adam Halas (53.80); Matej Duša (50.17)	Slovakia	23 May 2021	European Championships	Budapest, Hungary	

Legend: # – Record awaiting ratification by SPF; WR – World record; ER – European record; e – equalled existing record;
Records not set in finals: h – heat; sf – semifinal; r – relay 1st leg; rh – relay heat 1st leg; b – B final; † – en route to final mark; so – swim-off; tt – time trial

=== Women ===
Event	Time		Name	Club	Date	Meet	Location	Ref
50 m freestyle	24.67		Lillian Slušná	PAP Svit	27 June 2026	Grand Prix Slovakia	Šamorín, Slovakia	
100 m freestyle	54.45		Martina Moravcová	Slovakia	5 July 2000	European Championships	Helsinki, Finland	
200 m freestyle	1:58.32		Martina Moravcová	Slovakia	19 September 2000	Olympic Games	Sydney, Australia	
400 m freestyle	4:14.02		Katarína Listopadová	Kúpele Piešťany	16 April 2016	Trofeu Maria Lenk	Rio de Janeiro, Brazil	
800 m freestyle	8:50.65		Martina Moravcová	Kúpele Piešťany	11 May 1996	-	Ljubljana, Slovenia	
1500 m freestyle	17:10.68		Veronika Kolníková	TJ Znojmo	3 March 2019	Grand Prix Slovakia	Bratislava, Slovakia	
50m backstroke	28.23		Katarína Listopadová	Slovakia	24 June 2016	Trofeo Sette Colli	Rome, Italy	
100m backstroke	1:00.21		Katarína Listopadová	Slovakia	25 June 2016	Trofeo Sette Colli	Rome, Italy	
200m backstroke	2:13.73		Karolína Hájková	Orca Bratislava	17 June 2016	Slovak Championships	Bratislava, Slovakia	
50m breaststroke	31.38		Andrea Podmaníková	Pirana	14 December 2023	Gyor Open	Gyor, Hungary	
100m breaststroke	1:08.02		Andrea Podmaníková	Pirana	16 December 2023	Gyor Open	Gyor, Hungary	
200m breaststroke	2:26.69	sf	Nikoleta Trníková	Slovakia	13 August 2026	European Championships	Paris, France	
50m butterfly	25.63	h	Tamara Potocka	Slovakia	1 August 2025	World Championships	Singapore, Singapore	
100m butterfly	57.20		Martina Moravcová	Slovakia	2 August 2002	European Championships	Berlin, Germany	
200m butterfly	2:10.70		Denisa Smolenová	Slovakia	27 May 2012	European Championships	Debrecen, Hungary	
200m individual medley	2:12.29	h	Tamara Potocka	Slovakia	27 July 2025	World Championships	Singapore, Singapore	
400m individual medley	4:48.72		Nikoleta Trníková	Povazskobystricky PO	9 April 2022	Eindhoven Qualification Meet	Eindhoven, Netherlands	
4×100m freestyle relay	3:43.63	h	Katarína Listopadová (57.14); Katarína Filová (55.27); Miroslava Syllabová (56.44); Martina Moravcová (54.78)	Slovakia	26 July 2009	World Championships	Rome, Italy	
4×200m freestyle relay	8:10.99	h	Laura Benková (2:03.66); Zora Ripková (2:02.90); Tamara Potocka (2:01.79); Martina Cibulková (2:02.64)	Slovakia	21 May 2021	European Championships	Budapest, Hungary	
4×100m medley relay	4:08.38	h	Emma Marušáková (1:04.20); Andrea Podmaníková (1:08.37); Tamara Potocká (1:00.04); Teresa Ivanová (55.77)	Slovakia	23 May 2021	European Championships	Budapest, Hungary	

Legend: # – Record awaiting ratification by SPF; WR – World record; ER – European record; e – equalled existing record;
Records not set in finals: h – heat; sf – semifinal; r – relay 1st leg; rh – relay heat 1st leg; b – B final; † – en route to final mark; so – swim-off; tt – time trial

=== Mixed relay ===
Event	Time		Name	Club	Date	Meet	Location	Ref
4×100 m freestyle relay	3:29.88		Matej Duša (49.37); Tibor Tistan (50.32); Lillian Slušná (55.17); Teresa Ivan (55.02)	Slovakia	17 February 2024	World Championships	Doha, Qatar	
4×200 m freestyle relay	7:54.33	h	Jakub Poliačik (1:53.18); Richard Nagy (1:53.42); Zora Ripková (2:04.74); Martina Cibulková (2:02.99)	Slovakia	18 May 2021	European Championships	Budapest, Hungary	
4×100 m medley relay	3:54.19	h	Karin Tomečková (1:03.44); Tomáš Klobučník (1:01.36); Katarína Listopadová (58.46); Michal Navara (50.93)	Slovakia	19 August 2014	European Championships	Berlin, Germany	

Legend: # – Record awaiting ratification by SPF; WR – World record; ER – European record; e – equalled existing record;
Records not set in finals: h – heat; so – swim-off

== Short Course (25 m) ==
=== Men ===
Event	Time		Name	Club	Date	Meet	Location	Ref
50m freestyle	21.03	sf	Matej Duša	Slovakia	6 December 2025	European Championships	Lublin, Poland	
100m freestyle	47.15		Matej Duša	XBS swimming	16 December 2023	Slovak Championships	Šamorín, Slovakia	
200m freestyle	1:44.76	h	Samuel Košťál	Slovakia	3 December 2025	European Championships	Lublin, Poland	
400m freestyle	3:43.51	h	Richárd Nagy	Slovakia	5 December 2014	World Championships	Doha, Qatar	
800m freestyle	7:44.58		Richárd Nagy	Slovakia	17 October 2014	-	Plzeň, Czech Republic	
1500m freestyle	14:35.50		Richárd Nagy	Slovakia	7 December 2014	World Championships	Doha, Qatar	
50m backstroke	23.15	sf	Ľuboš Križko	Slovakia	12 December 2008	European Championships	Rijeka, Croatia	
100m backstroke	52.80		Samuel Košťál	J&T Sport Team	21 December 2025	Slovak Championships	Košice, Slovakia	
200m backstroke	1:55.72	h	Miroslav Machovič	Slovakia	7 April 2002	European Championships	Moscow, Russia	
50m breaststroke	26.65	h	Marek Botík	Slovakia	13 December 2017	European Championships	Copenhagen, Denmark	
100m breaststroke	57.71	sf	Tomáš Klobučník	Slovakia	3 December 2014	World Championships	Doha, Qatar	
200m breaststroke	2:04.29	h	Tomáš Klobučník	Slovakia	5 December 2014	World Championships	Doha, Qatar	
50m butterfly	22.91		Tibor Tišťan	PO Ružomberok	20 December 2024	Slovak Championships	Šamorín, Slovakia	
100m butterfly	51.34	h	Adam Halas	Slovakia	17 December 2022	World Championships	Melbourne, Australia	
200m butterfly	1:54.92	h	Richárd Nagy	Slovakia	15 December 2022	World Championships	Melbourne, Australia	
100m individual medley	53.20		Adam Halas	XBS swimming	23 October 2022	Slovak Cup	Šamorín, Slovakia	
200m individual medley	1:57.13	h	Richárd Nagy	Slovakia	13 December 2022	World Championships	Melbourne, Australia	
400m individual medley	4:04.73		Richárd Nagy	Slovakia	3 December 2015	European Championships	Netanya, Israel	
4×50m freestyle relay	1:29.21		Patrik Folťan (23.45); Adam Halas (22.32); Vladimir Štefánik (22.07); Matej Duša (21.37)	XBS swimming	19 December 2020	Bubble Control Race	Šamorín, Slovakia	
4×100m freestyle relay	3:16.51	h	Tibor Tišťan (49.05); Matej Duša (48.15); Adam Halas (49.92); Jakub Poliačik (49.39)	Slovakia	10 December 2024	World Championships	Budapest, Hungary	
4×200m freestyle relay	7:06.33	h	Jakub Poliacik (1:45.48); Matej Martinovic (1:46.13); Martin Perecinsky (1:47.97); Frantisek Jablcnik (1:46.75)	Slovakia	13 December 2024	World Championships	Budapest, Hungary	
4×50m medley relay	1:37.20	h	Adam Cernek (25.17); Marek Botík (26.57); Adam Halas (23.16); Vladimir Štefánik (22.30)	Slovakia	17 December 2017	European Championships	Copenhagen, Denmark	
4×100m medley relay	3:38.61		Patrik Folťan (54.74); Bence Dikácz (1:01.93); Adam Halas (52.37); Ondrej Duša (49.57)	XBS swimming	22 October 2021	Slovak Cup	Šamorín, Slovakia	

Legend: # – Record awaiting ratification by SPF; WR – World record; ER – European record; e – equalled existing record;
Records not set in finals: h – heat; sf – semifinal; r – relay 1st leg; rh – relay heat 1st leg; b – B final; † – en route to final mark; so – swim-off; tt – time trial

=== Women ===
Event	Time		Name	Club	Date	Meet	Location	Ref
50m freestyle	23.96		Lillian Slušná	PAP Svit	24 October 2026	Slovak Championships	Šamorín, Slovakia	
100m freestyle	52.96		Martina Moravcová	Slovakia	5 April 2002	European Championships	Moscow, Russia	
200m freestyle	1:54.74		Martina Moravcová	Slovakia	16 December 2001	European Championships	Antwerp, Belgium	
400m freestyle	4:07.02		Martina Moravcová	-	1995	-		
800 m freestyle	8:44.00		Martina Moravcová	-	1996	-		
1500m freestyle	16:43.51		Veronika Kolníková	TJ Znojmo	14 December 2018	Czech Winter Championships	Plzeň, Czech Republic	
50m backstroke	26.79	sf	Katarína Listopadová	Slovakia	5 December 2015	European Championships	Netanya, Israel	
100m backstroke	57.96	sf	Katarína Listopadová	Slovakia	2 December 2015	European Championships	Netanya, Israel	
200m backstroke	2:08.33	h	Tamara Potocká	Slovakia	3 November 2021	European Championships	Kazan, Russia	
50m breaststroke	29.84		Andrea Podmaníková	Pirana	17 December 2023	Slovak Championships	Šamorín, Slovakia	
100m breaststroke	1:04.77		Andrea Podmaníková	Slovakia	6 December 2023	European Championships	Otopeni, Romania	
200m breaststroke	2:20.17		Andrea Podmaníková	Slovakia	8 December 2023	European Championships	Otopeni, Romania	
50m butterfly	25.62		Lillian Slušná	PAP Svit	19 December 2025	Slovak Championships	Košice, Slovakia	
100m butterfly	56.55		Martina Moravcová	Slovakia	26 January 2002	World Cup	Berlin, Germany	
200m butterfly	2:06.63		Martina Moravcová	Slovakia	20 November 2004	World Cup	Durban, South Africa	
100m individual medley	58.85	sf	Tamara Potocká	Slovakia	3 December 2025	European Championships	Lublin, Poland	
200m individual medley	2:07.17	h	Tamara Potocká	Slovakia	10 December 2024	World Championships	Budapest, Hungary	
400m individual medley	4:37.69	h	Nikoleta Trníková	Slovakia	2 November 2021	European Championships	Kazan, Russia	
4×50m freestyle relay	1:36.94	h	Tamara Potocká (24.26); Alexandra Hrncarova (24.42); Teresa Ivan (24.41); Lillian Slusna (23.85)	Slovakia	2 December 2025	European Championships	Lublin, Poland	
4×100m freestyle relay	3:39.23	h	Lillian Slusna (55.34); Tamara Potocka (54.46); Zora Ripkova (55.62); Teresa Ivanova (53.81)	Slovakia	13 December 2022	World Championships	Melbourne, Australia	
4×100m freestyle relay	3:38.25	h, #	Teresa Ivan (54.33); Zora Ripkova (55.07); Alexandra Hrncarova (54.57); Lillian Slusna (54.28)	Slovakia	10 December 2024	World Championships	Budapest, Hungary	
4×200m freestyle relay	8:01.71	h	Zora Ripkova (1:59.78); Tamara Potocka (1:58.68); Teresa Ivanova (2:03.06); Martina Cibulkova (2:00.19)	Slovakia	14 December 2022	World Championships	Melbourne, Australia	
4×50m medley relay	1:48.28	h	Teresa Ivan (27.84); Andrea Podmaníková (30.66); Tamara Potocká (25.37); Lillian Slušná (24.41)	Slovakia	7 December 2025	European Championships	Lublin, Poland	
4×100m medley relay	3:57.18	h	Teresa Ivan (59.79); Andrea Podmaníková (1:06.31); Tamara Potocka (56.72); Lillian Slusna (54.36)	Slovakia	15 December 2024	World Championships	Budapest, Hungary	

Legend: # – Record awaiting ratification by SPF; WR – World record; ER – European record; e – equalled existing record;
Records not set in finals: h – heat; sf – semifinal; r – relay 1st leg; rh – relay heat 1st leg; b – B final; † – en route to final mark; so – swim-off; tt – time trial

=== Mixed relay ===
Event	Time		Name	Club	Date	Meet	Location	Ref
4×50 m freestyle relay	1:30.36		Matej Duša (21.24); Tibor Tišťan (21.18); Teresa Ivan (23.91); Lillian Slusna (24.03)	Slovakia	13 December 2024	World Championships	Budapest, Hungary	
4×50 m medley relay	1:41.80	h	Martin Perečinský (24.97); Andrea Podmaníková (30.59); Tamara Potocká (25.09); Matej Duša (21.15)	Slovakia	11 December 2024	World Championships	Budapest, Hungary	
4×100 m medley relay	3:44.55	h	Martin Perečinský (52.71); Andrea Podmaníková (1:06.78); Tamara Potocká (56.76); Jakub Poliačik (48.30)	Slovakia	14 December 2024	World Championships	Budapest, Hungary	

Legend: # – Record awaiting ratification by SPF; e – equalled existing record;
Records not set in finals: h – heat; so – swim-off
