= Botswana at the 2019 World Aquatics Championships =

- Flag of Botswana
- World Aquatics code: BOT
- National federation: Botswana Swimming Sport Association

in Gwangju, South Korea
- Competitors: 3 in 1 sport
- Medals: Gold 0 Silver 0 Bronze 0 Total 0

World Aquatics Championships appearances
- 1973; 1975; 1978; 1982; 1986; 1991; 1994; 1998; 2001; 2003; 2005; 2007; 2009; 2011; 2013; 2015; 2017; 2019; 2022; 2023; 2024; 2025

Botswana competed at the 2019 World Aquatics Championships in Gwangju, South Korea from 12 to 28 July.

== Swimming ==
Botswana entered three swimmers.

Men

Athlete	Event	Heat		Semifinal		Final	
Athlete	Event	Time	Rank	Time	Rank	Time	Rank
James Freeman	200 m freestyle	DSQ		Did not advance			
James Freeman	400 m freestyle	4:00.48	39	—N/a		Did not advance	
Adrian Robinson	50 m breaststroke	29.11	51	Did not advance			
Adrian Robinson	100 m breaststroke	1:04.26	60	Did not advance			

Women

Athlete	Event	Heat		Semifinal		Final	
Athlete	Event	Time	Rank	Time	Rank	Time	Rank
Naomi Ruele	50 m freestyle	DNS		Did not advance			
