= Botswana at the 2015 World Aquatics Championships =

- Flag of Botswana
- FINA code: BOT
- National federation: Botswana Swimming Sport Association

in Kazan, Russia
- Competitors: 4 in 1 sport
- Medals: Gold 0 Silver 0 Bronze 0 Total 0

World Aquatics Championships appearances
- 1973; 1975; 1978; 1982; 1986; 1991; 1994; 1998; 2001; 2003; 2005; 2007; 2009; 2011; 2013; 2015; 2017; 2019; 2022; 2023; 2024

Botswana competed at the 2015 World Aquatics Championships in Kazan, Russia from 24 July to 9 August 2015.

== Swimming ==
Botswana swimmers have achieved qualifying standards in the following events (up to a maximum of 2 swimmers in each event at the A-standard entry time, and 1 at the B-standard):

Men

Athlete	Event	Heat		Semifinal		Final	
Athlete	Event	Time	Rank	Time	Rank	Time	Rank
David van der Colff	50 m backstroke	26.88	49	did not advance			
David van der Colff	100 m backstroke	57.95	51	did not advance			
Andre van der Merwe	100 m freestyle	54.69	90	did not advance			
Andre van der Merwe	200 m freestyle	2:01.77	76	did not advance			

Women

Athlete	Event	Heat		Semifinal		Final	
Athlete	Event	Time	Rank	Time	Rank	Time	Rank
Bonita Imsirovic	50 m breaststroke	36.46	57	did not advance			
Bonita Imsirovic	100 m breaststroke	1:20.81	62	did not advance			
Naomi Ruele	100 m freestyle	59.62	66	did not advance			
Naomi Ruele	50 m backstroke	29.36	31	did not advance			
