= Botswanan =

Botswanan, a term used internationally ("Batswana" is the preferred term locally) may refer to:

- A member of the Tswana people, an ethnic group in southern Africa
- A citizen of Botswana of any ethnic background
- Tswana language

== See also ==
- Batswana (singular Motswana), Tswana people in Southern Africa, who speak the Tswana language which is also known as Setswana
- Motswana (disambiguation)
