= Swimming at the 2025 World Aquatics Championships – Women's 200 metre individual medley =

Women's 200 metre individual medley at the 2025 World Aquatics Championships
- Venue: World Aquatics Championships Arena
- Location: Singapore Sports Hub, Kallang
- Dates: 27 July (heats and semifinals); 28 July (final)
- Competitors: 38 from 27 nations
- Winning time: 2:06.69

Medalists
gold medal	Summer McIntosh	Canada
silver medal	Alex Walsh	United States
bronze medal	Mary-Sophie Harvey	Canada

The women's 200 metre individual medley event at the 2025 World Aquatics Championships was held from 27 to 28 July 2025 at the World Aquatics Championships Arena at the Singapore Sports Hub in Kallang, Singapore.

== Background ==
The event did not feature Kate Douglass or Kaylee McKeown which left Summer McIntosh of Canada as the clear favorite. McIntosh had broken the world record at the 2025 Canadian Trials with 2:05.70, improving almost a second from her 2024 Olympic gold medal swim of 2:06.56.

Alex Walsh of the United States, who had a 2:07.13 lifetime best, and China’s Yu Yiting, who held a 2:07.75 best and had won bronze at the previous two World Championships, were leading medal contenders. Canada’s Mary-Sophie Harvey (2:08.78) was also entering in strong form. Other contenders for the final were Anastasia Gorbenko of Israel, Abbie Wood of Great Britain, Phoebe Bacon of the United States, Roos Vanotterdijk of Belgium, and Ella Ramsay of Australia.

== Qualification ==
Each National Federation was permitted to enter a maximum of two qualified athletes in each individual event, but they could do so only if both of them had attained the "A" standard qualification time. For this event, the "A" standard qualification time was 2:12.83. Federations could enter one athlete into the event if they met the "B" standard qualification time. For this event, the "B" standard qualification time was 2:17.48. Athletes could also enter the event if they had met an "A" or "B" standard in a different event and their Federation had not entered anyone else. Additional considerations applied to Federations who had few swimmers enter through the standard qualification times. Federations in this category could at least enter two men and two women to the competition, all of whom could enter into up to two events.

Top 10 fastest qualification times
Swimmer	Country	Time	Competition
Summer McIntosh	Canada	2:05.70	2025 Canadian Trials
Kaylee McKeown	Australia	2:06.63	2024 Australian Olympic Trials
Kate Douglass	United States	2:06.79	2024 United States Olympic Trials
Alex Walsh	United States	2:07.45	2024 Summer Olympics
Sydney Pickrem	Canada	2:07.68	2024 Canadian Trials
Torri Huske	United States	2:08.47	Texas stop of the 2024 TYR Pro Swim Series
Yu Yiting	China	2:08.49	2024 Summer Olympics
Anastasia Gorbenko	Israel	2:08.55	Barcelona stop of the 2024 Mare Nostrum Swim Tour
Mary-Sophie Harvey	Canada	2:08.78	2025 Canadian Trials
Abbie Wood	Great Britain	2:08.85	2025 British Championships

== Records ==
Prior to the competition, the existing world and championship records were as follows.

World record	Summer McIntosh (CAN)	2:05.70	Victoria, Canada	9 June 2025
Competition record	Katinka Hosszú (HUN)	2:06.12	Kazan, Russia	3 August 2015

== Heats ==
The heats were held on 27 July at 10:02. Vietnam's Võ Thị Mỹ Tiên won the first heat with 2:16.96, which was not fast enough to qualify. China's Yu Yiting won the second heat with 2:10.33, which was the fifth fastest qualifying time; the US's Alex Walsh won the third heat with the third fastest qualifying time of 2:09.50; and Australian Tara Kinder won the fourth and final heat with 2:09.45. Slovakia's Tamara Potocká and Spain's Emma Carrasco finished with the joint sixteenth fastest qualifying time, so they later raced in a swim-off to determine who would proceed to the semifinals.

Rank	Heat	Lane	Name	Nationality	Time	Notes
1	4	2	Tara Kinder	Australia	2:09.45	Q
2	4	4	Summer McIntosh	Canada	2:09.46	Q
3	3	4	Alex Walsh	United States	2:09.50	Q
4	3	5	Mary-Sophie Harvey	Canada	2:09.95	Q
5	2	4	Yu Yiting	China	2:10.33	Q
6	4	3	Ella Ramsay	Australia	2:10.53	Q
7	2	3	Mio Narita	Japan	2:10.87	Q
8	3	6	Shiho Matsumoto	Japan	2:10.94	Q
9	2	5	Abbie Wood	Great Britain	2:11.15	Q
10	2	7	Ellen Walshe	Ireland	2:11.45	Q
11	4	5	Anastasia Gorbenko	Israel	2:11.53	Q
12	3	3	Phoebe Bacon	United States	2:11.55	Q
13	2	6	Rebecca Meder	South Africa	2:11.68	Q
14	4	1	Lea Polonsky	Israel	2:11.85	Q
15	2	2	Yu Zidi	China	2:11.90	Q
16	3	2	Emma Carrasco	Spain	2:12.29	SO
16	4	8	Tamara Potocká	Slovakia	2:12.29	SO, NR
18	4	6	Katie Shanahan	Great Britain	2:12.42	
19	2	1	Aimee Canny	South Africa	2:12.70	
20	4	0	Clara Rybak-Andersen	Denmark	2:12.74	
21	4	7	Sara Franceschi	Italy	2:12.91	
22	3	7	Anita Gastaldi	Italy	2:13.07	
23	3	1	Laura Cabanes	Spain	2:13.80	
24	4	9	Nikoletta Pavlopoulou	Greece	2:13.85	NR
25	3	8	Ellie McCartney	Ireland	2:13.86	
26	2	8	Kristen Romano	Puerto Rico	2:15.09	
27	3	9	Letitia Sim	Singapore	2:15.45	
28	3	0	Diana Petkova	Bulgaria	2:16.03	
29	2	0	Lee Song-eun	South Korea	2:16.87	
30	1	5	Võ Thị Mỹ Tiên	Vietnam	2:16.96	
31	1	4	Kamonchanok Kwanmuang	Thailand	2:19.11	
32	1	6	Stephanie Iannaccone	Guatemala	2:19.92	
33	2	9	Nicole Frank	Uruguay	2:20.25	
34	1	3	Lai Wa Ng	Hong Kong	2:22.55	
35	1	2	Yasmin Silva Contreras	Peru	2:26.57	
36	1	7	Melodi Saleshando	Botswana	2:41.13	
37	1	8	Meral Ayn Latheef	Maldives	2:44.34	NR
38	1	1	Joanna Chen	Papua New Guinea	2:48.66	

=== Swim-off ===
The swim-off took place on 27 July at 13:03. Emma Carrasco won with a time of 2:12.21, so she advanced to the semifinals.

Rank	Lane	Name	Nationality	Time	Notes
1	4	Emma Carrasco	Spain	2:12.21	Q
2	5	Tamara Potocká	Slovakia	2:12.99	

== Semifinals ==
The semifinals took place on 27 July at 20:00.

Rank	Heat	Lane	Name	Nationality	Time	Notes
1	1	4	Summer McIntosh	Canada	2:07.39	Q
2	2	5	Alex Walsh	United States	2:08.49	Q
3	2	6	Mio Narita	Japan	2:09.16	Q
4	2	7	Anastasia Gorbenko	Israel	2:09.68	Q
5	2	2	Abbie Wood	Great Britain	2:10.12	Q
6	1	5	Mary-Sophie Harvey	Canada	2:10.19	Q
7	2	8	Yu Zidi	China	2:10.22	Q
8	1	2	Ellen Walshe	Ireland	2:10.49	Q, NR
9	2	3	Yu Yiting	China	2:10.63	
10	2	1	Rebecca Meder	South Africa	2:11.05	
11	1	3	Ella Ramsay	Australia	2:11.22	
12	2	4	Tara Kinder	Australia	2:11.24	
13	1	7	Phoebe Bacon	United States	2:11.53	
14	1	6	Shiho Matsumoto	Japan	2:11.69	
15	1	1	Lea Polonsky	Israel	2:12.29	
16	1	8	Emma Carrasco	Spain	2:12.49	

== Final ==
The final took place on 28 July at 20:19.

Rank	Lane	Name	Nationality	Time	Notes
1st place, gold medalist(s)	4	Summer McIntosh	Canada	2:06.69	
2nd place, silver medalist(s)	5	Alex Walsh	United States	2:08.58	
3rd place, bronze medalist(s)	7	Mary-Sophie Harvey	Canada	2:09.15	
4	1	Yu Zidi	China	2:09.21	
5	3	Mio Narita	Japan	2:09.56	
6	2	Abbie Wood	Great Britain	2:09.92	
7	6	Anastasia Gorbenko	Israel	2:10.26	
8	8	Ellen Walshe	Ireland	2:11.57	
