= 2024 World Aquatics Swimming Championships (25 m) – Women's 200 metre individual medley =

Swimming competition

Women's 200 metre individual medley at the 2024 World Aquatics Swimming Championships (25 m)
- Venue: Duna Arena
- Location: Budapest, Hungary
- Dates: 10 December (heats and final)
- Competitors: 35
- Winning time: 2:01.63 WR

Medalists
| gold medal | Kate Douglass | United States |
| silver medal | Alex Walsh | United States |
| bronze medal | Abbie Wood | Great Britain |

The women's 200 metre individual medley event at the 2024 World Aquatics Swimming Championships (25 m) was held on 10 December 2024 at the Duna Arena in Budapest, Hungary.

== Records ==
Prior to the competition, the existing world and championship records were as follows:

| World record | Katinka Hosszú (HUN) | 2:01.86 | Doha, Qatar | 6 December 2014 |
| Competition record | Katinka Hosszú (HUN) | 2:01.86 | Doha, Qatar | 6 December 2014 |

The following record was established during the competition:

| Date | Event | Name | Nationality | Time | Record |
|---|---|---|---|---|---|
| 10 December | Final | Kate Douglass | United States | 2:01.63 | WR |

== Results ==
=== Heats ===
The heats were started at 10:44.

| Rank | Heat | Lane | Name | Nationality | Time | Notes |
|---|---|---|---|---|---|---|
| 1 | 2 | 4 | Abbie Wood | United Kingdom | 2:05.16 | Q |
| 2 | 3 | 4 | Mary-Sophie Harvey | Canada | 2:05.99 | Q |
| 3 | 4 | 4 | Kate Douglass | United States | 2:06.08 | Q |
| 4 | 4 | 3 | Rebecca Meder | South Africa | 2:06.15 | Q, NR |
| 5 | 4 | 2 | Emma Carrasco Cadens | Spain | 2:06.42 | Q |
| 6 | 4 | 6 | Ellen Walshe | Ireland | 2:06.50 | Q, NR |
| 7 | 3 | 3 | Alex Walsh | United States | 2:06.63 | Q |
| 8 | 3 | 2 | Tamara Potocká | Slovakia | 2:07.17 | Q, NR |
| 9 | 2 | 2 | Hanna Bergman | Sweden | 2:08.25 | R |
| 10 | 2 | 5 | Chiara Della Corte | Italy | 2:08.29 | R |
| 11 | 4 | 5 | Tara Kinder | Australia | 2:08.41 | |
| 12 | 4 | 8 | Clara Rybak-Andersen | Denmark | 2:08.61 | |
| 13 | 2 | 8 | Kristen Romano | Puerto Rico | 2:08.92 | NR |
| 14 | 3 | 8 | Zheng Huiyu | China | 2:09.23 | |
| 15 | 3 | 6 | Kayla Hardy | Australia | 2:09.27 | |
| 16 | 2 | 3 | Misuzu Nagaoka | Japan | 2:09.37 | |
| 17 | 3 | 1 | Diana Petkova | Bulgaria | 2:09.50 | NR |
| 18 | 3 | 5 | Lena Kreundl | Austria | 2:09.82 | |
| 19 | 2 | 6 | Dalma Sebestyén | Hungary | 2:09.94 | |
| 20 | 3 | 7 | Fernanda Gomes Celidonio | Brazil | 2:10.08 | |
| 21 | 4 | 7 | Laura Cabanes Garzás | Spain | 2:10.55 | |
| 22 | 2 | 7 | Zhou Yanjun | China | 2:11.51 | |
| 23 | 3 | 0 | Phiangkhwan Pawapotako | Thailand | 2:13.58 | |
| 24 | 1 | 6 | Viktoriia Blinova | Neutral Athletes B | 2:13.78 | |
| 25 | 4 | 1 | Gina McCarthy | New Zealand | 2:14.14 | |
| 26 | 2 | 0 | Xiandi Chua | Philippines | 2:14.85 | |
| 27 | 2 | 1 | Lee Hee-eun | South Korea | 2:15.35 | |
| 28 | 4 | 9 | Nicole Frank | Uruguay | 2:15.97 | |
| 29 | 3 | 9 | Ng Lai Wa | Hong Kong | 2:16.16 | |
| 30 | 1 | 3 | Tara Aloul | Jordan | 2:19.20 | NR |
| 31 | 1 | 2 | Alexis Margett | Bolivia | 2:20.06 | NR |
| 32 | 4 | 0 | Applejean Gwinn | Chinese Taipei | 2:20.25 | |
| 33 | 2 | 9 | Cheang Weng Chi | Macau | 2:21.50 | |
| 34 | 1 | 4 | Yasmin Silva | Peru | 2:22.45 | |
| 35 | 1 | 5 | Molina Smalley | Namibia | 2:22.81 | |

=== Final ===
The final was held at 18:01.

| Rank | Lane | Name | Nationality | Time | Notes |
|---|---|---|---|---|---|
| 1st place, gold medalist(s) | 3 | Kate Douglass | United States | 2:01.63 | WR |
| 2nd place, silver medalist(s) | 1 | Alex Walsh | United States | 2:02.65 | |
| 3rd place, bronze medalist(s) | 4 | Abbie Wood | United Kingdom | 2:02.75 | NR |
| 4 | 5 | Mary-Sophie Harvey | Canada | 2:04.30 | |
| 5 | 7 | Ellen Walshe | Ireland | 2:05.52 | NR |
| 6 | 6 | Rebecca Meder | South Africa | 2:05.61 | AF |
| 7 | 2 | Emma Carrasco Cadens | Spain | 2:07.62 | |
| 8 | 8 | Tamara Potocká | Slovakia | 2:08.00 | |
