= Botswana at the 2011 World Aquatics Championships =

- Flag of Botswana
- FINA code: BOT
- National federation: Botswana Swimming Sport Association

in Shanghai, China
- Competitors: 2 in 1 sports
- Medals: Gold 0 Silver 0 Bronze 0 Total 0

World Aquatics Championships appearances
- 1973; 1975; 1978; 1982; 1986; 1991; 1994; 1998; 2001; 2003; 2005; 2007; 2009; 2011; 2013; 2015; 2017; 2019; 2022; 2023; 2024

Botswana competed at the 2011 World Aquatics Championships in Shanghai, China between July 16 and 31, 2011.

== Swimming ==
Botswana qualified 2 swimmers.

Men

| Athlete | Event | Heats | | Semifinals | | Final | |
| Athlete | Event | Time | Rank | Time | Rank | Time | Rank |
|---|---|---|---|---|---|---|---|
| John Kamyuka | 50 m freestyle | 26.30 | 76 | did not advance | | | |
| John Kamyuka | 50 m butterfly | 29.03 | 45 | did not advance | | | |

Women

| Athlete | Event | Heats | | Semifinals | | Final | |
| Athlete | Event | Time | Rank | Time | Rank | Time | Rank |
|---|---|---|---|---|---|---|---|
| Deandra van der Colff | 50 m freestyle | 30.60 | 62 | did not advance | | | |
| Deandra van der Colff | 50 m butterfly | 34.06 | 47 | did not advance | | | |
