= National symbols of Botswana =

The national symbols of Botswana (Setswana: Matshwao a bosetšhaba a Botswana) are the objects, images, or cultural expressions that are emblematic, representative, or otherwise characteristic of the republic of Botswana or Batswana culture. There are 9 official national symbols.

== Insignia ==
Type	Symbol	Description	Adopted	Image	Ref.
Coat of arms	Coat of arms of Botswana	The coat of arms of Botswana was designed following a design competition. Two women sent in designs, but the cabinet approved neither of them. George Winstanley was instructed to blend the best features in both, and it was slightly altered by his wife and the College of Heralds before being published. The coat of arms features two zebras, with the one on the right holding an ear of sorghum, and the one on the left holding a tusk of ivory, symbolizing the country's elephant population. The three cogs at the top of the shield represent the country's industry, and the three waves allude to the country's national motto, Pula, also featured at the bottom. At the bottom of the shield is the head of a bull, which symbolises the importance of cattle herding in Botswana.	25 January 1966		
Flag	Flag of Botswana	The flag of Botswana was designed solely by George Winstanley, a British colonial administrator who served in the Bechuanaland Protectorate, after there were reportedly no good entries during a flag design competition. It contains an azure blue background which represents water and rainfall; crucial resources in the arid nation. The white and black stripes represent the stripes of a zebra; the national animal, along with racial harmony.	30 September 1966		

== Culture ==
Type	Symbol	Description	Adopted	Ref.
Anthem	Fatshe leno la rona		30 September 1966	
Motto	Pula		25 January 1966 (Note: Adopted with the coat of arms)	

== Species ==
The zebra was already a national symbol when the government declared four more species national symbols in March 2014. They were unveiled in Gaborone on 12 May 2014. In December 2014 President Ian Khama launched postage stamps that depict the four species.

Type	Symbol	Description	Adopted	Image	Ref.
Animal	Zebra		1966		
Bird	Kgori (Kori bustard)		12 May 2014		
Flower	Sengaparile (Harpagophytum procumbens)		12 May 2014		
Grass	Motsikiri (Eragrostis pallens)		12 May 2014		
Tree	Morula (Sclerocarya caffra)		12 May 2014		
