= Botswana at the 2013 World Aquatics Championships =

- Flag of Botswana
- FINA code: BOT
- National federation: Botswana Swimming Sport Association

in Barcelona, Spain
- Competitors: 3 in 1 sports
- Medals: Gold 0 Silver 0 Bronze 0 Total 0

World Aquatics Championships appearances
- 1973; 1975; 1978; 1982; 1986; 1991; 1994; 1998; 2001; 2003; 2005; 2007; 2009; 2011; 2013; 2015; 2017; 2019; 2022; 2023; 2024

Botswana competed at the 2013 World Aquatics Championships in Barcelona, Spain from 19 July to 4 August 2013.

== Swimming ==
Botswana qualified 6 quota places for the following swimming events:

Men

Athlete	Event	Heat		Semifinal		Final	
Athlete	Event	Time	Rank	Time	Rank	Time	Rank
Adrian Todd	50 m freestyle	24.65	64	did not advance			
Adrian Todd	50 m butterfly	25.98	52	did not advance			

Women

Athlete	Event	Heat		Semifinal		Final	
Athlete	Event	Time	Rank	Time	Rank	Time	Rank
Deandra van der Colff	50 m freestyle	29.27	64	did not advance			
Deandra van der Colff	50 m butterfly	31.96	53	did not advance			
Bonita Imsirovic	50 m breaststroke	36.53	63	did not advance			
Bonita Imsirovic	100 m breaststroke	1:21.97	57	did not advance			
