= Deandra =

Deandra is a given name. Notable people with the name include:

- DeAndra' Cobb (born 1981), American former football player
- Deandra Dottin (born 1991), Barbadian and West Indies cricketer and former track and field athlete
- Deandra Grant (born 1968), American lawyer and legal educator
- Deandra van der Colff (born 1993), Botswanan swimmer

== Characters ==
- Deandra Reynolds, bartender from It's Always Sunny in Philadelphia
