= Botswana at the 2024 World Aquatics Championships =

- Flag of Botswana
- FINA code: BOT
- National federation: Botswana Swimming Sport Association

in Doha, Qatar
- Competitors: 3 in 2 sports
- Medals: Gold 0 Silver 0 Bronze 0 Total 0

World Aquatics Championships appearances
- 1973; 1975; 1978; 1982; 1986; 1991; 1994; 1998; 2001; 2003; 2005; 2007; 2009; 2011; 2013; 2015; 2017; 2019; 2022; 2023; 2024

Botswana will compete at the 2024 World Aquatics Championships in Doha, Qatar from 2 to 18 February.

== Competitors ==
The following is the list of competitors in the Championships.

Sport	Men	Women	Total
Open water swimming	1	0	1
Swimming	1	1	2
Total	2	1	3

== Open water swimming ==
Botswana swimmer has achieved qualifying standards in the following events.

Men

Athlete	Event	Time	Rank
Benco Van Rooyen	Men's 5 km	OTL	

== Swimming ==
Botswana swimmers have achieved qualifying standards in the following events.

Men

Athlete	Event	Heat		Semifinal		Final	
Athlete	Event	Time	Rank	Time	Rank	Time	Rank
Adrian Robinson	50 m breaststroke	28.60	33	Did not advance			
Adrian Robinson	100 m breaststroke	1:03.42	44	Did not advance			

Women

Athlete	Event	Heat		Semifinal		Final	
Athlete	Event	Time	Rank	Time	Rank	Time	Rank
Maxine Egner	50 m freestyle	26.58	47	Did not advance			
