= Botswana at the 2023 World Aquatics Championships =

- Flag of Botswana
- FINA code: BOT
- National federation: Botswana Swimming Sport Association

in Fukuoka, Japan
- Competitors: 2 in 1 sport
- Medals: Gold 0 Silver 0 Bronze 0 Total 0

World Aquatics Championships appearances
- 1973; 1975; 1978; 1982; 1986; 1991; 1994; 1998; 2001; 2003; 2005; 2007; 2009; 2011; 2013; 2015; 2017; 2019; 2022; 2023; 2024

Botswana is set to compete at the 2023 World Aquatics Championships in Fukuoka, Japan from 14 to 30 July.

== Swimming ==
Botswana entered 2 swimmers.

Men

Athlete	Event	Heat		Semifinal		Final	
Athlete	Event	Time	Rank	Time	Rank	Time	Rank
Adrian Robinson	50 metre breaststroke	28.67	36	Did not advance			
Adrian Robinson	100 metre breaststroke	1:03.79	49	Did not advance			

Women

Athlete	Event	Heat		Semifinal		Final	
Athlete	Event	Time	Rank	Time	Rank	Time	Rank
Maxine Egner	50 metre freestyle	26.90	53	Did not advance			
Maxine Egner	100 metre freestyle	59.02	40	Did not advance			
