= Agriculture in Botswana =

Agriculture in Botswana is a sector of the national economy with a small contribution to GDP but significant employment. Due to ineffective agricultural policies, the sector remains stagnant. Crop production is subsidized and regulated by the government through the Integrated Support Programme for Arable Agriculture Development (ISPAAD), modeled on European Union systems. Livestock production is more intensive than crop production.

== Physical geography ==
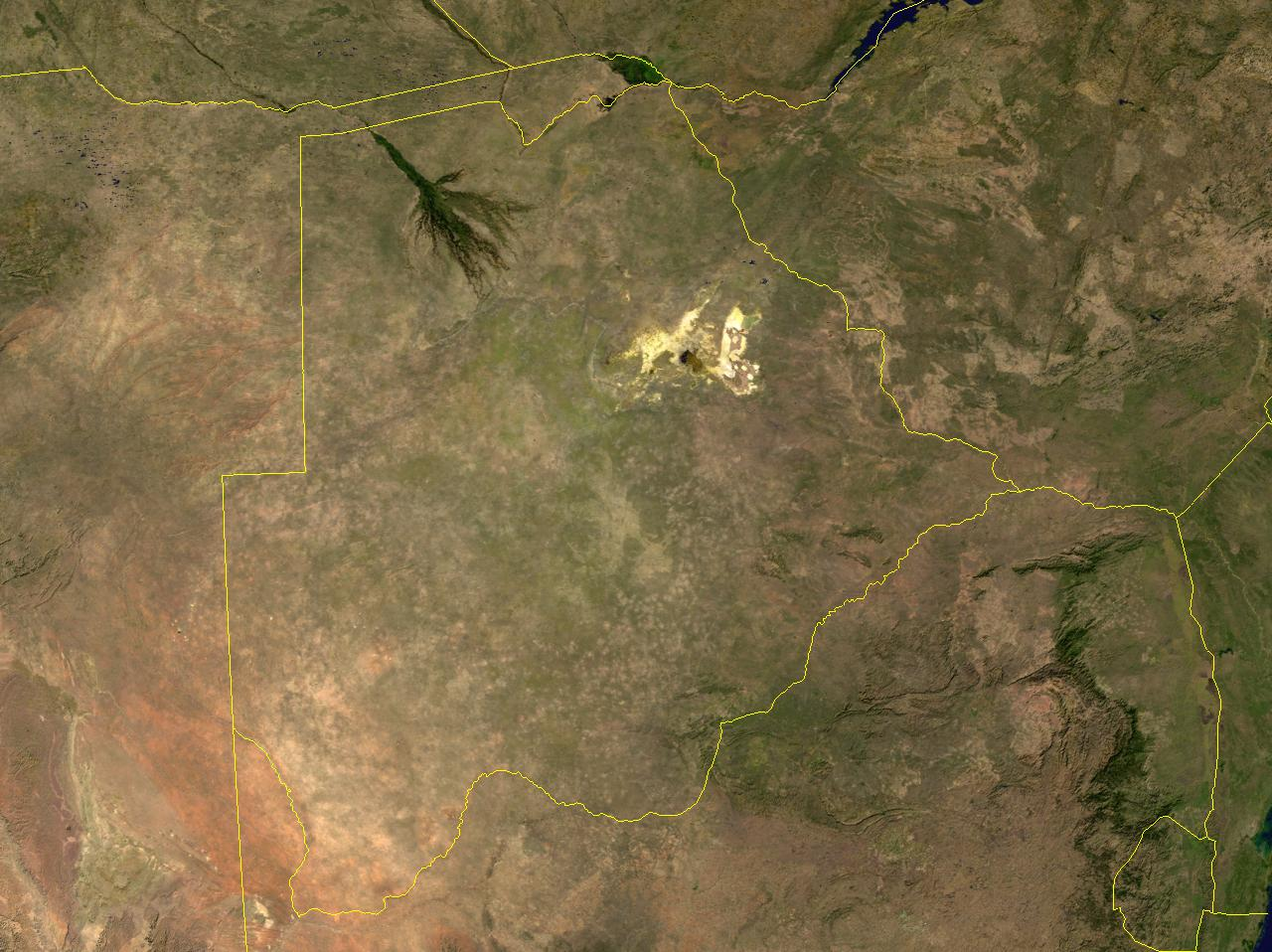
Satellite image of Botswana

Location of the Kalahari (red – desert, red and orange – basin)

=== Agroclimate ===
Located in the Southern Hemisphere, Botswana experiences seasons opposite to those in the Northern Hemisphere. The growing season lasts year-round, though localized frosts occur in winter. July is the coolest month, while January is the warmest. Annual atmospheric temperature is significant for Africa, with average winter temperatures around 12 °C and summer temperatures around 24 °C. Minimum temperatures can drop below 5 °C, while maximums rarely exceed 35 °C. High temperatures and strong sunlight create favorable conditions for biomass development.

However, high elevation and a continental climate result in low precipitation, ranging from 250 to 650 mm annually. The highest rainfall occurs in the north near the Okavango Delta, while the lowest is in the Kalahari. Droughts, occurring approximately every three years, cause significant declines in agricultural production.

=== Soils ===
Botswana's soils are predominantly ultisols, red-brown, and grey soils. The Kalahari Desert features typical desert soils.

=== Hydrology ===
Botswana lies along a continental drainage divide. The southern and central regions, dominated by the Kalahari Desert, lack permanent watercourses, and the central desert also lacks seasonal streams. In the north, the Okavango Delta, the world's largest inland river delta, is a key feature. The Limpopo River flows along the eastern border with South Africa, while the Botletle River is the largest river entirely within Botswana.

== Socio-economic factors ==
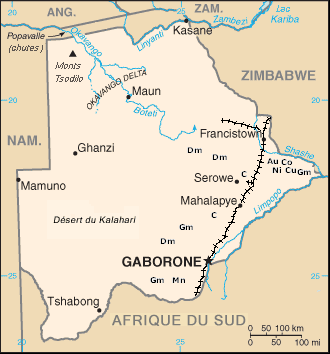
Main mining centers and railway network

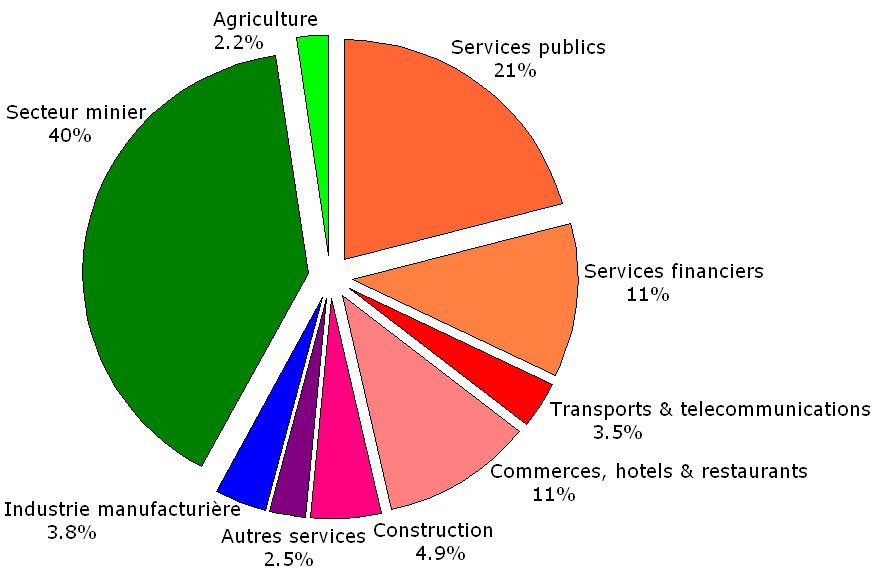
Botswana's GDP in 2006 (agriculture 2.2% – light green)

=== Socio-economic development ===
Botswana is a middle-income country, below the global average but above the African average. According to the HDI, it ranks 118th out of 187 countries. At independence in 1966, Botswana was among the world's poorest nations, with minimal infrastructure, no industry, and unexploited mineral resources. Agriculture then accounted for 40% of GDP, supplemented by remittances, mainly from South Africa. The discovery of mineral resources (primarily copper and diamonds) in 1967 spurred development, transforming Botswana into a middle-income nation. Unlike many rapidly developing countries, Botswana sustained economic growth for three decades. By the 2000s, agriculture's GDP share fell to 2.7%, largely due to agricultural challenges rather than industrial or service sector growth. Agriculture employs over 20% of the workforce.

=== Urbanization and industrialization ===
Botswana is sparsely urbanized, with most cities in the eastern region, while the western desert areas are nearly uninhabited. Only two cities exceed 100,000 residents.

=== Agricultural policy ===
Botswana employs a system of agricultural subsidies and quotas similar to the European Union's, through the Integrated Support Programme for Arable Agriculture Development (ISPAAD), which favors large-scale and industrial agriculture. The program aims to increase income and reduce farming risks. Before independence, Botswana was a food exporter, but failed reforms and weak agricultural governance have made it a food importer, primarily from South Africa. The government purchases grain and resells it to mills at inflated prices, leading to underfunding and reduced yields. In some cases, grain is sold to South Africa, only to be repurchased by Botswana's millers. Low production quotas, set at about 80% of capacity, increase extensiveness and reduce crop yields, particularly for cereals.

== Production ==
=== Crop production ===
In 2008, arable land covered 278,909 hectares, with 226,521 hectares under cultivation and 125,803 hectares harvested.

==== Root crops ====
In 2010, root crops dominated harvests, with 99,400 tonnes collected (11th globally), primarily cassava.

==== Cereals ====
Sorghum is the most widespread cereal, with 41,000 tonnes harvested in 2010, accounting for about 70% of cereal production and 90% of cultivated areas. Botswana's dry climate favors sorghum and millet over other cereals. Sorghum is grown across the country, except in deserts and fertile areas where maize and other demanding crops are cultivated. Gluten-free sorghum beer is popular, ranking 14th globally. Maize, with 14,100 tonnes harvested, is vital for human and animal consumption, especially for chicken feed. Large industrial farmers favor maize. Millet, with 1,800 tonnes harvested, is grown mainly in the north and was the dominant cereal before independence.

==== Vegetables and fruits ====
In 2010, vegetable harvests totaled 27,400 tonnes, surpassing maize, while fruit harvests reached 5,400 tonnes. Native fruit trees, such as marula, mongongo, medlar, corky-bark monkey orange tree, Natal orange, and African chewing gum, are crucial food sources during droughts.

=== Livestock production ===
Livestock production is more significant than in most African countries. In 2010, cow's milk led with 114,170 tonnes, while beef (36,600 tonnes) and game meat (23,200 tonnes) topped value. Botswana ranks 5th globally in dried meat production, following the biltong tradition. In 2008, cattle numbered 2,219,503 head, with 1,944,375 owned by traditional farmers. Goats totaled 1,878,833, with 1,840,646 held by traditional farmers, and sheep numbered 303,238, with 281,782 under traditional ownership. Livestock numbers fluctuated without clear trends from 1998 to 2008. Poultry farming, primarily chickens, is significant, with industrial farms producing eggs and meat. In the 1980s, poultry employed 4,500 people, mostly women, surpassing mining's employment share. After a decline, employment stabilized by the late 2000s.

== Agricultural techniques ==
Botswana employs traditional and industrial farming methods. Traditional farms control 92% of agricultural land, while industrial farms focus on livestock production.

== Agricultural challenges ==
Unfavorable natural conditions, particularly in the Kalahari Desert, limit agriculture to 5% of Botswana's land. Arable land is largely confined to the Limpopo Valley. Government agricultural policy, which mimics the EU system, sets low production quotas, undermining cereal crop yields and contributing to sector decline.

== Bibliography ==
- Harrison, Phillipa Anne (2003). The impact of tourism on agriculture in the Okavango delta, Botswana. Pietermaritzburg: University of Natal.
- Martyn, Danuta (1995). Klimat kuli ziemskiej [Climate of the Earth] (in Polish). Warsaw: PWN. ISBN 83-01-11845-8.
