= Adam Halas =

Slovak swimmer

Personal information
- Nationality: Slovak
- Born: 2 August 1998 (age 28) Voderady, Slovakia

Sport
- Sport: Swimming

Adam Halas (born 2 August 1998) is a Slovak swimmer. He competed in the men's 50 metre butterfly event at the 2018 FINA World Swimming Championships (25 m) in Hangzhou, China.

Halas holds several Slovak national records.
