= Motswana =

Motswana (pl. Batswana) may refer to:

- A member of the Tswana people, an ethnic group in southern Africa
- A citizen of Botswana of any ethnic background
- Aaron Motswana, South African politician
