= Aaron Motswana =

South African politician

Aaron Motswana MPL

Member of the North West Provincial Legislature
- Incumbent
- Assumed office 22 May 2019

Personal details
- Citizenship: South Africa
- Party: African National Congress

Aaron Motswana is a South African politician who has represented the African National Congress (ANC) in the North West Provincial Legislature since 2019. He was formerly the Mayor of Mamusa Local Municipality in the North West.

== Mayor of Mamusa ==
Motswana was elected to the North West ANC's Provincial Executive Committee in 2015, under the leadership of ANC Provincial Chairperson Supra Mahumapelo, and he was elected Mayor of Mamusa in August 2016 after the 2016 local elections. His term on the Provincial Executive Committee ended prematurely when the national party leadership disbanded the committee in mid-2018, and he was among the committee members who attempted to challenge the decision in court. In December 2018, the ANC announced that it would ask Motswana to resign as Mayor of Mamusa "in the interest of public confidence" in the ANC. However, Motswana refused to resign, alleging that he was being targeted for remaining a supporter of Supra Mahumapelo.

== Provincial legislature ==
Motswana remained in the mayoral office until the 2019 general election, when he was ranked 21st on the ANC's provincial party list and secured a seat in the North West Provincial Legislature. On 31 January 2021, the ANC announced that he and four other ANC legislators would be suspended from the party for defying an instruction from Chief Whip Paul Sebegoe; the incident in question had occurred during a session of the legislature in which Priscilla Williams was elected the Chairperson of Committees, beating the ANC's preferred candidate Lenah Miga, and Motswana and the others had reportedly voted to conduct the election by secret ballot, in defiance of an ANC instruction to the caucus. However, Motswana's suspension was terminated when the party leadership failed to serve disciplinary charges against them within the timelines set out in the ANC constitution.
