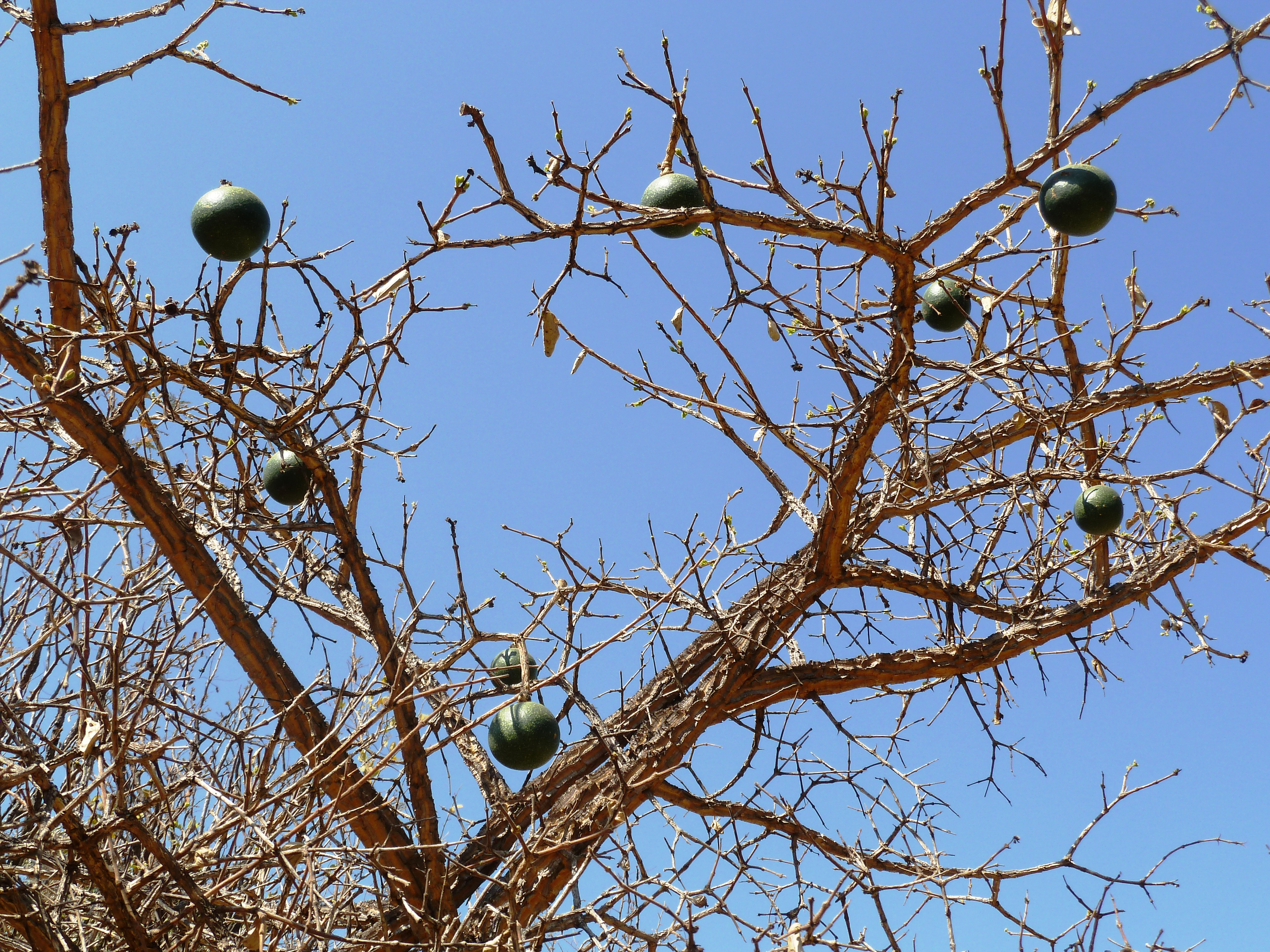

Scientific classification
- Kingdom: Plantae
- Clade: Embryophytes
- Clade: Tracheophytes
- Clade: Spermatophytes
- Clade: Angiosperms
- Clade: Eudicots
- Clade: Asterids
- Order: Gentianales
- Family: Loganiaceae
- Genus: Strychnos
- Species: S. cocculoides

Binomial name
- Strychnos cocculoides Baker

= Strychnos cocculoides =

Species of tree native to Southern Africa

Strychnos cocculoides, also known as the corky-bark monkey orange tree, or Ntonga, and suurklapper in Afrikaans, is a fruiting tree of Southern Africa. It produces a "large, pleasant flavored fruit" (the monkey orange) that is sometimes hard to find in shops but easy to handle. The flavorful fruit is considered a good prospect for further agricultural and economic development in the region.
