= Swimming at the 2015 African Games – Women's 100 metre breaststroke =

Women's 100 metre breaststroke at the 2015 African Games
- Venue: Kintele Aquatic Complex
- Date: September 9, 2015
- Competitors: 13 from 10 nations

Medalists
gold medal	Tatjana Schoenmaker	South Africa
silver medal	Maii Atif	Egypt
bronze medal	Daniela Lindemeier	Namibia

The women's 100 metre breaststroke event at the 2015 African Games took place on 9 September 2015 at Kintele Aquatic Complex.

== Schedule ==
All times are Congo Standard Time (UTC+01:00)

Date	Time	Event
Wednesday, 9 September 2015	10:20	Heat 1
Wednesday, 9 September 2015	10:23	Heat 2
Wednesday, 9 September 2015	17:25	Final

== Results ==
=== Heats ===
Rank	Heat	Athlete	Time	Notes
1	2	Tatjana Schoenmaker (RSA)	1:10.60	Q
2	1	Rebecca Kamau (KEN)	1:12.37	Q
3	1	Kelly Gunnell (RSA)	1:13.03	Q
4	2	Daniela Lindemeier (NAM)	1:13.40	Q
5	2	Maii Atif (EGY)	1:13.75	Q
6	1	Rwioda Heshem (EGY)	1:14.02	Q
7	2	Hannah Taleb Bendiab (ALG)	1:16.44	
8	1	Farah Ben Khelil (TUN)	1:19.16	Q
9	2	Bonita Imsirovic (BOT)	1:20.53	
10	2	Rachek Tonjor (NGR)	1:21.32	Q
11	1	Natasha Oduor Owino (KEN)	1:24.69	
12	1	Gisela Cossa (MOZ)	1:28.14	
13	2	Shannon Hassen (ZAM)	1:32.37	

=== Final ===
Rank	Athlete	Time	Notes
1st place, gold medalist(s)	Tatjana Schoenmaker (RSA)	1:09.47	
2nd place, silver medalist(s)	Maii Atif (EGY)	1:11.07	
3rd place, bronze medalist(s)	Daniela Lindemeier (NAM)	1:11.31	
4	Rebecca Kamau (KEN)	1:11.32	
5	Kelly Gunnell (RSA)	1:11.71	
6	Rwioda Heshem (EGY)	1:12.18	
7	Farah Ben Khelil (TUN)	1:16.33	
8	Rachek Tonjor (NGR)	1:19.67	
