= Katarína Filová =

Slovak swimmer

Personal information
- Nationality: Slovakia
- Born: 14 May 1989 (age 37) Bratislava, Czechoslovakia
- Height: 1.73 m (5 ft 8 in)
- Weight: 63 kg (139 lb)

Sport
- Sport: Swimming
- Strokes: Freestyle
- Club: J&T Sport Team Bratislava (SVK)
- College team: Virginia Tech Hokies (USA)
- Coach: Ned Skinner (USA); Gabriel Baran (SVK)

Katarína Filová (born 14 May 1989 in Bratislava) is a Slovak former competitive swimmer, who specialized in sprint freestyle events. She represented her country at the 2012 Summer Olympics, swimming in the heats of the women's 100 and 200 metres.

== Career ==
Filova was coached and trained by Gabriel Baran in Bratislava, as well as Ned Skinner at Virginia Tech. She qualified for two swimming events at the 2012 Summer Olympics in London, by achieving the FINA B-standard entry times of 55.66 (100 m freestyle) and 2:01.02 (200 m freestyle) at the Grand Prix Slovakia in her home city Bratislava. Her qualification was announced in July 2012 after FINA confirmed the B-standard qualification times. In the 200 m freestyle, Filova challenged seven other swimmers in the second heat, including former Olympic champion Camelia Potec of Romania. Swimming in lane eight, Filova edged out Austria's Jördis Steinegger to pick up sixth spot and twenty-eighth overall by 0.36 of a second in 2:02.03. In her second event, 100 m freestyle, Filova pulled off another sixth-place finish in heat four, a quarter of a second (0.25) behind Olympic breaststroke champion Rūta Meilutytė of Lithuania in a time of 56.58. Filova failed to advance into the semifinals, as she placed thirty-first overall out of 48 swimmers in the preliminaries.

Filova started her fourth-year junior year of an international studies major at Virginia Tech in Blacksburg, Virginia in August 2012. She was one of two Slovak athletes, alongside hammer thrower Marcel Lomnický, who returned to train with the Virginia Tech Hokies after the 2012 Olympics. In 2013 she was an Atlantic Coast Conference team champion in the 200 metre medley relay event, with teammates Sabrina Benson, Heather Savage and Alyssa Bodin.
