= James Freeman (swimmer) =

Botswana swimmer (born 2001)

Personal information
- Full name: James Samuel Freeman
- Nationality: Botswana
- Born: 28 March 2001 (age 25) Palapye, Botswana

Sport
- Sport: Swimming
- Strokes: Freestyle
- College team: University of Minnesota
Medal record
Men's swimming
Representing Botswana
Commonwealth Youth Games
Bronze medal – third place	2017 Bahamas	1500 m freestyle

James Samuel Freeman (born 28 March 2001) is a Botswana swimmer. He competed in the men's 400 metre freestyle at the 2019 World Aquatics Championships and he did not qualify to compete in the final. He competed for Botswana at the 2020 Summer Olympics in the men's 200m freestyle event and the men's 400m freestyle event.

Freeman is a native of Palapye, Botswana and competes at the collegiate level for the University of Minnesota.
