= Coat of arms of Botswana =

Versions
- Shield
- Armiger: Republic of Botswana
- Adopted: 25 January 1966
- Shield: Argent three barrulets wavy in fesse Botswana blue between in chief three Botswana blue cogwheels, one above engaged with two below and in base a brown bull's head caboshed proper
- Supporters: and for the supporters on either side a zebra the dexter supporting a white elephant's tusk the sinister a green stalk of sorghum and brown sorghum head with white grains proper. Motto "Pula" in black on a Botswana blue half tone scroll. The reverse side of the scroll is red.
- Motto: Pula

The coat of arms of Botswana consists of two zebras holding sorghum and ivory. Three cogs lie at the top of a shield representing the country's mineral production. The three waves in the middle of the shield allude to the country's national motto, Pula. At the bottom of the shield is the head of a bull. The central shield has been criticized for seeming to originate from Zulu ihwau shields rather than Batswana battle shields. The coat of arms' design is defined in the Botswana Emblems Law. The coat of arms was adopted in January 1966.

The design was created following a competition led by administrator George Winstanley, combining the two winning entries, and the College of Heralds finalised the design. The coat of arms is featured on the national passport, the national currency, and the presidential standard.

== Design and symbolism ==
The coat of arms features two zebras, with the one on the right holding an ear of sorghum, and the one on the left holding a tusk of ivory, symbolizing the country's elephant population. The coat of arms incorporates Botswana's motto, Pula, which is displayed on a scroll at the base and symbolized by three water waves. Positioned above these waves, a trio of interlocking gears represents the nation's industrial and mineral sectors. At the bottom of the shield is the head of a bull, which symbolises the importance of cattle herding in Botswana.

Part I of the Botswana Emblems Law: Blazon of the Arms or Ensigns Armorial of Botswana described the coat of arms of Botswana as follows:

Argent three barrulets way in fess azure-between chief three cog wheels one above engaged with two below and in base a bull's head caboshed proper, and for the supporters on either side a zebra the dexter supporting an elephant's tusk the sinister stalk of sorghum proper. Motto Pula.

However, its wording was superseded in 2004, which states:

Argent three barrulets wavy in fesse Botswana blue between in chief three Botswana blue cogwheels, one above engaged with two below and in base a brown bull's head caboshed proper, and for the supporters on either side a zebra the dexter supporting a white elephant's tusk the sinister a green stalk of sorghum and brown sorghum head with white grains proper. Motto "Pula" in black on a Botswana blue half tone scroll. The reverse side of the scroll is red.

=== Criticism ===
Local commentators in 1966 criticized the central shield for resembling Zulu ihawu shields instead of traditional Batswana battle shields. While these initial commentators identified the design as alien to Tswana style, later research indicates that the oval design was historically used by Batswana hunters. Historian Neil Parsons argues that the shield is of Zulu origin because the Zulu and Swazi peoples retained its use in traditional dances.

== Protocol and usage ==
Botswana's presidential standard, which features a coat of arms in the center.

The Botswana Emblems Law establishes broad protections for national symbols covered by the law, including the coat of arms, empowering the President to regulate its use or the use of any device resembling it. For commercial use of the flag, organizations separate of the Government of Botswana must send a formal request to the Permanent Secretary to the President of Botswana. The application must include company documents, product samples, and usage details.

The coat of arms feature on the obverse of Botswana's currency, the Botswana pula. Its subunit, the thebe, features a version of the coat of arms without the two zebras. The coat of arms is also featured in the center of the presidential standard, along with the front cover of the national passport.

=== Prohibition of desecration ===
Section 91 of the Botswana Penal Code criminalises any acts, spoken words or published writings that intentionally insult, mock or cause destain for some designated national symbols, including the flag. Conviction under this provision could result in a fine up to P500 (roughly US$37 as of 2024).

== History ==
In 1885, the Bechuanaland Protectorate was formed as a part of the British Empire, and would later gain its independence as the Republic of Botswana in 1966. Before its independence, the nation had no unique national emblems and flew the British Union Jack during its colonial period.

George Winstanley, a British colonial administrator who served in the Bechuanaland Protectorate, administered a coat of arms design competition. Following the competition, Winstanley stated there were "two good entries" from Isabel Fawcus and Shiela England. The Cabinet of Bechuanaland rejected both initial designs. Instead, they instructed Winstanley to merge the strongest elements of each submission into a single concept. It was edited by his wife before being sent to the College of Heralds, who made the finishing touches. The final version was approved by the government and adopted on January 25, 1966, prior to the nation's independence on September 30, 1966.
