= Miroslava Syllabová =

Slovak swimmer

Personal information
- Nationality: Slovak
- Born: 5 September 1990 (age 34); Levice, Czechoslovakia

Sport
- Sport: Swimming

Miroslava Syllabová (born 5 September 1990) is a Slovak swimmer. She was born in Levice. She competed in the women's 50m freestyle at the 2012 Summer Olympics in London, finishing with a time of 26.07 seconds in 38th place in the heats.
