= Nada Daabousová =

Slovak synchronized swimmer (born 1997)

Personal information
- Nationality: Slovakia
- Born: 15 January 1997 (age 29) Bratislava

Sport
- Country: Slovakia
- Sport: Synchronized swimming
- Club: TJ Slávia STU Bratislava

Nada Daabousová (born 15 January 1997) is a Slovak synchronized swimmer. She competed in the women's duet at the 2016 Summer Olympics held in Rio de Janeiro, Brazil. Her greatest solo success is the 7th place in Artistic swimming at the 2020 European Aquatics Championships – Solo free routine.
