= Karolína Hájková =

Slovak swimmer

Personal information
- Born: 14 December 1997 (age 28) Bratislava, Slovakia
- Height: 176 cm (5 ft 9 in)

Sport
- Sport: Swimming
- College team: University of Hawaii at Manoa

Karolína Hájková (born 14 December 1997) is a Slovak swimmer. She competed in the women's 200 metre backstroke event at the 2017 World Aquatics Championships. She is currently a member of the swimming and diving team at the University of Hawaii at Manoa.
