= Matej Duša =

Slovak swimmer (born 2000)

Personal information
- Born: 10 July 2000 (age 26) Bratislava, Slovakia
- Height: 1.94 m (6 ft 4 in)
- Weight: 90 kg (198 lb)

Sport
- Country: Slovakia
- Sport: Swimming
- Club: XBS Swimming

Matej Duša (born 10 July 2000) is a Slovak swimmer.

== Career ==
He has competed at three World Aquatics Championships in 2022, 2023 and 2024. His best result came at the 2024 World Aquatics Championships in Doha where he reached the semifinals of the 50 metres freestyle.

He holds the Slovak records in the 50 and 100 metres freestyle in long and short course metres.

== Education ==
He studied at the Queens University of Charlotte and competed for the swim team.
