= Marek Botík =

Slovak swimmer (born 1991)

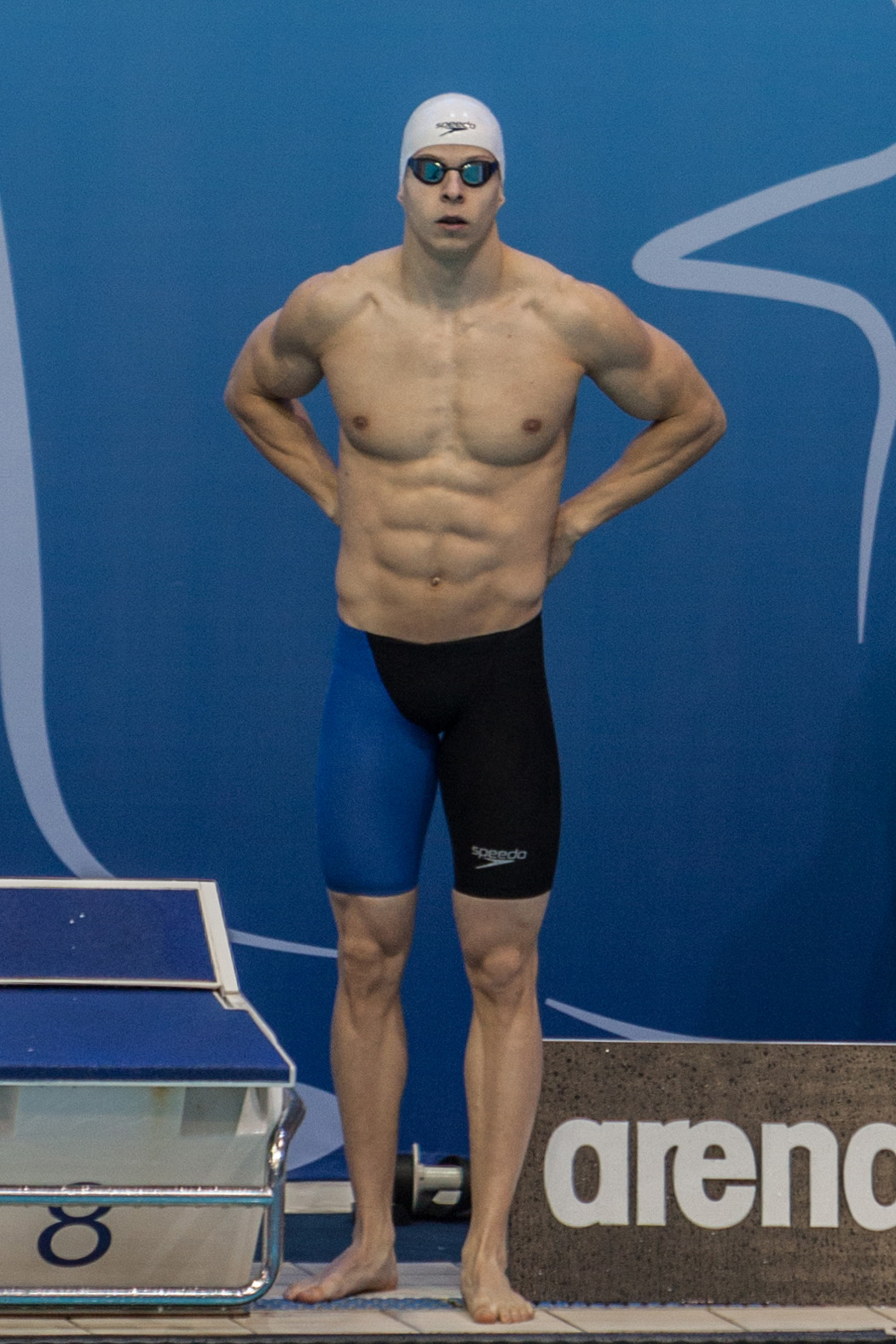

Personal information
- Born: 28 June 1991 (age 35)

Sport
- Sport: Swimming

Marek Botík (born 28 June 1991) is a Slovak swimmer. He competed in the men's 50 metre breaststroke event at the 2017 World Aquatics Championships.
