= Katarína Listopadová =

Slovak swimmer

Personal information
- Nationality: Slovakia
- Born: 22 March 1993 (age 33) Bratislava, Slovakia
- Height: 1.69 m (5 ft 6 1/2 in)
- Weight: 61 kg (134 lb)

Sport
- Sport: Swimming
- Strokes: Freestyle, butterfly, medley
- Club: J&T Sport Team Bratislava
- Coach: Gabriel Baran
Medal record
Swimming
Representing Slovakia
Summer Universiade
Bronze medal – third place	2015 Gwengju	100m butterfly
European Youth Summer Olympic Festival
Silver medal – second place	2007 Belgrade	200 m individual medley

Katarína Listopadová (born 22 March 1993 in Bratislava) is a Slovak swimmer, who specialized in freestyle, butterfly, and individual medley events. She currently holds four Slovak records in the freestyle relays (both 400 and 800 m). Listopadova is also a resident athlete for J&T Sport Team Bratislava, and is coached and trained by Gabriel Baran.

Listopadova made her international debut at the 2010 Summer Youth Olympics in Singapore, where she placed fourth in the 100 m freestyle (56.90), 50 m butterfly (27.38), and 100 m butterfly (1:00.35).

At the 2012 Summer Olympics in London, Listopadova qualified as Slovakia's youngest athlete and swimmer for the women's 200 m individual medley. She posted a FINA B-standard entry time of 2:16.42 from the Budapest Open in Hungary. She topped the first heat by more than half a second (0.50) ahead of Olympic veterans Cheng Wan-jung of Chinese Taipei and Emilia Pikkarainen of Finland, outside her entry time of 2:16.81. Listopadova failed to advance into the semifinals, as she shared a twenty-eighth place tie with Iceland's Eygló Ósk Gústafsdóttir in the preliminaries.
