= Slovakia at the 2011 World Aquatics Championships =

Sporting event delegation

Flag of Slovakia

Slovakia competed at the 2011 World Aquatics Championships in Shanghai, China between July 16 and 31, 2011.

== Swimming ==
Slovakia qualified 4 swimmers.

Men

Athlete	Event	Heats		Semifinals		Final	
Athlete	Event	Time	Rank	Time	Rank	Time	Rank
Pavol Jelenak	Men's 400m Freestyle	4:03.82	37			did not advance	
Pavol Jelenak	Men's 800m Freestyle	8:28.07	47			did not advance	
Pavol Jelenak	Men's 200m IM	2:10.15	42	did not advance			
Tomáš Klobučník	Men's 50m Breaststroke	28.95	35	did not advance			
Tomáš Klobučník	Men's 100m Breaststroke	1:02.69	50	did not advance			
Tomáš Klobučník	Men's 200m Breaststroke	2:16.53	34	did not advance			

Women

Athlete	Event	Heats		Semifinals		Final	
Athlete	Event	Time	Rank	Time	Rank	Time	Rank
Katarína Filová	Women's 50m Freestyle	26.83	36	did not advance			
Katarína Filová	Women's 100m Freestyle	57.06	40	did not advance			
Katarína Filová	Women's 200m Freestyle	2:01.96	35	did not advance			
Katarína Filová	Women's 400m Freestyle	4:21.14	28			did not advance	
Katarína Listopadová	Women's 100m Freestyle	56.52	37	did not advance			
Katarína Listopadová	Women's 200m Freestyle	2:02.15	36	did not advance			
Katarína Listopadová	Women's 50m Butterfly	27.62	29	did not advance			
Katarína Listopadová	Women's 100m Butterfly	59.87	30	did not advance			
Katarína Listopadová	Women's 200m Butterfly	2:17.72	30	did not advance			

== Synchronised swimming ==
Slovakia has qualified 3 athletes in synchronised swimming.

Women

Athlete	Event	Preliminary		Final	
Athlete	Event	Points	Rank	Points	Rank
Kristína Krajčovičová	Solo Technical Routine	75.700	21	did not advance	
Kristína Krajčovičová	Solo Free Routine	74.980	20	did not advance	
Dáša Baloghová; Jana Labáthová	Duet Technical Routine	77.300	25	did not advance	
Dáša Baloghová; Jana Labáthová	Duet Free Routine	76.240	29	did not advance	
