= Botswana Swimming Sport Association =

Sports governing body in Botswana

CANA
- Founded: 2005
- FINA affiliation: 2006
- CANA affiliation: xxxx
- President: James Kamyuka

The Botswana Swimming Sport Association is the national governing body for the sport of swimming in Botswana.
