= Tomáš Klobučník =

Slovak swimmer

Personal information
- Nickname: Kolozh
- Nationality: Slovakia
- Born: 21 June 1990 (age 36) Topoľčany, Czechoslovakia
- Height: 1.85 m (6 ft 1 in)
- Weight: 88 kg (194 lb)

Sport
- Sport: Swimming
- Strokes: Breaststroke
- Club: J&T Sport Team Bratislava
- Coach: Gabriel Baran

Tomáš Klobučník (born 21 June 1990 in Topoľčany) is a Slovak swimmer, who specializes in breaststroke events. He is a multiple-time Slovak swimming champion and record holder in the 100 and 200 m breaststroke, and also, a two-time Swimmer of the Year (2009 and 2011) by the Slovak Swimming Federation. Klobucnik is also a resident athlete for J&T Sport Team Bratislava, and is coached and trained by Gabriel Baran.

Klobucnik qualified for the men's 200 m breaststroke at the 2012 Summer Olympics in London, by breaking a long-course Slovak record, eclipsing the FINA B-cut time of 2:13.10 at the European Championships in Debrecen, Hungary. He challenged seven other swimmers in the second heat, including four-time OIympian Jakob Jóhann Sveinsson of Iceland. He raced to third place by less than 0.11 of a second behind Poland's Slawomir Kuczko in 2:13.40. Klobucnik failed to advance into the semifinals, as he placed twenty-third overall in the preliminaries.

At the 2016 Summer Olympics, he took part in the 100 m breaststroke but was unable to progress from the first round.
