= Flag of Botswana =

Republic of Botswana
- Use: National flag
- Proportion: 2:3
- Adopted: 30 September 1966; 60 years ago
- Design: An azure blue field cut horizontally in the centre by a black stripe with a thin white frame
- Designed by: George Winstanley

The national flag of Botswana (Setswana: folaga ya Botswana) consists of an azure blue background cut horizontally in the centre by a black stripe with a thin white frame. The flag's design is outlined in the Botswana Emblems Law, and Section 91 of the Botswana Penal Code criminalises insults towards the flag. The blue represents water and rainfall, and the black stripe with a white frame represents racial harmony. The flag was designed by George Winstanley, a British colonial administrator, and it was adopted in 1966 to replace the Union Jack following its independence from the United Kingdom.

== Design and symbolism ==
The azure blue background represents water and rainfall, a resource crucial to the agriculture of the arid nation, whilst the black central stripe bordered by two white stripes represents racial harmony. The flag's adoption was a symbolic rejection of the system of apartheid, where its themes of racial equality contrasted with policies of racial hierarchy seen in South Africa and Rhodesia at the time. While talking about the flag in 2003, president Festus Mogae described the flag as "a symbol of [Batswana (Note: Plural of Motswana, denonym for Botswana residents)] fortitude and confidence... [their] very existence as an independent and sovereign people." The rectangular flag is defined as having a 2:3 ratio. The flag is one of few African flags that do not use the Pan-African colours featured on Ethiopia's flag from 1991–1996.

=== Construction ===
The flags construction is outlined in Part II: Design of the National Flag of Botswana, of the Botswana Emblems Law.

Five horizontal stripes having colour and width as follows, that is to say taken from the top:

- 1st Stripe - azure blue having a width equal to 9/24ths of the total depth of the flag.
- 2nd Stripe - white having a width equal to 1/24th of such depth.
- 3rd Stripe - black having a width equal to 4/24ths of such depth.
- 4th Stripe - white having a width equal to 1/24th of such depth.
- 5th Stripe - azure blue having a width equal to 9/24ths of such depth.

This law also does not provide any exact colour specifications; but the Botswana Bureau of Standards specifies the blue as Pantone 15-4225 TCX.

Construction sheet of the flag of Botswana

== Protocol and usage ==
The Botswana Emblems Law establishes broad protections for national symbols covered by the law, including the national flag, empowering the President to regulate its use or the use of any device resembling it. For commercial use of the flag, organizations separate of the Government of Botswana must send a formal request to the Permanent Secretary to the President of Botswana. The application must include company documents, product samples, and usage details.

The flag of Botswana is hoisted during Independence Day parades.

=== Prohibition of desecration ===
Section 91 of the Botswana Penal Code criminalises any acts, spoken words or published writings that intentionally insult, mock or cause destain for some designated national symbols, including the flag. Conviction under this provision could result in a fine up to P500 (roughly US$37 as of 2024).

=== Flag of convenience ===
Despite Botswana being a landlocked nation with no official ship registry, its national flag has been fraudulently displayed on at least 17 ocean-going vessel in 2026 in what is reportedly shadow fleet activity to avoid sanctions, a common pattern with other African national flags.

== History ==
In 1885, the Bechuanaland Protectorate was formed as a part of Great Britain's colonial empire, and would later gain its independence as the Republic of Botswana in 1966. Before its independence the nation had no unique national emblems and flew the Union Jack during its colonial period.

George Winstanley, a British colonial administrator, administered a flag design competition; however he described all the entries as "hopeless", which resulted in Winstanley designing the flag himself. The new flag was first hoisted at midnight on 30 September 1966, the day Botswana gained independence.

== See also ==
- Coat of arms of Botswana
- National symbols of Botswana
