= Tamara Potocká =

Slovak swimmer (born 2002)

Personal information
- Born: 15 August 2002 (age 23) Poprad, Slovakia
- Height: 172 cm (5 ft 8 in)
- Weight: 58 kg (128 lb)

Sport
- Country: Slovakia
- Sport: Swimming
Medal record
Women's swimming
Representing Slovenia
European U23 Championships
Silver medal – second place	2025 Samorin	50 m butterfly
Bronze medal – third place	2025 Samorin	200 m medley

Tamara Potocká (born 15 August 2002) is a Slovak swimmer. She competed at the 2024 Summer Olympics in Paris and at the 2018 Summer Youth Olympics in Buenos Aires.

== Biography ==
Tamara Potocká was born on 15 August 2002 in Poprad.

On 2 August 2024, Potocká collapsed at the poolside after a qualifying heat of the women's 200-metre individual medley at the Paris Olympics. She was conscious as she was carried away on a stretcher.
