= Richard Nagy (swimmer) =

Slovak swimmer

Personal information
- National team: Slovakia
- Born: 9 March 1993 (age 33) Želiezovce, Slovakia
- Height: 1.86 m (6 ft 1 in)
- Weight: 73 kg (161 lb)

Sport
- Sport: Swimming
- Strokes: Individual medley, freestyle
Medal record
Men's swimming
Representing Slovakia
European Championships (LC)
Silver medal – second place	2016 London	400 m medley

Richard Nagy (Hungarian: Nagy Richárd; born 9 March 1993) is a Slovak swimmer from Želiezovce. He is a member of the Hungarian community in Slovakia.

He competed at the 2016 Summer Olympics in Rio de Janeiro, and the 2020 Summer Olympics in Tokyo.
