= Vietnam at the 2025 World Aquatics Championships =

- Flag of Vietnam
- World Aquatics code: VIE
- National federation: Vietnam Aquatic Sports Association

in Singapore
- Competitors: 4 in 1 sport
- Medals: Gold 0 Silver 0 Bronze 0 Total 0

World Aquatics Championships appearances
- 1973; 1975; 1978; 1982; 1986; 1991; 1994; 1998; 2001; 2003; 2005; 2007; 2009; 2011; 2013; 2015; 2017; 2019; 2022; 2023; 2024; 2025

Vietnam competed at the 2025 World Aquatics Championships in Singapore from July 11 to August 3, 2025.

== Competitors ==
The following is the list of competitors in the Championships.

Sport	Men	Women	Total
Swimming	3	1	4
Total	3	1	4

== Swimming ==
Vietnam entered 4 swimmers.

Men

Athlete	Event	Heat		Semi-final		Final	
Athlete	Event	Time	Rank	Time	Rank	Time	Rank
Nguyễn Quang Thuấn	400 m individual medley	4:23.99	25	—		Did not advance	
Nguyễn Huy Hoàng	1500 m freestyle	15:19.39	14	—		Did not advance	
Phạm Thanh Bảo	200 m breaststroke	2:15.73	27	Did not advance			

Women

Athlete	Event	Heat		Semi-final		Final	
Athlete	Event	Time	Rank	Time	Rank	Time	Rank
Võ Thị Mỹ Tiên	200 m individual medley	2:16.96	30	Did not advance			
