= Puerto Rico at the 2024 World Aquatics Championships =

- Flag of Puerto Rico
- World Aquatics code: PUR
- National federation: Federación Puertorriqueña de Natación
- Website: www.natacionpr.org

in Doha, Qatar
- Competitors: 12 in 3 sports
- Medals: Gold 0 Silver 0 Bronze 0 Total 0

World Aquatics Championships appearances
- 1973; 1975; 1978; 1982; 1986; 1991; 1994; 1998; 2001; 2003; 2005; 2007; 2009; 2011; 2013; 2015; 2017; 2019; 2022; 2023; 2024; 2025

Puerto Rico competed at the 2024 World Aquatics Championships in Doha, Qatar from 2 to 18 February.

== Competitors ==
The following is the list of competitors in the Championships.

Sport	Men	Women	Total
Diving	1	3	4
Open water swimming	2	2	4
Swimming	3	1	4
Total	6	6	12

== Diving ==
Men

Athlete	Event	Preliminaries		Semifinals		Final	
Athlete	Event	Points	Rank	Points	Rank	Points	Rank
Emanuel Vázquez	3 m springboard	343.80	27	Did not advance			
Emanuel Vázquez	10 m platform	359.30	20	Did not advance			

Women

Athlete	Event	Preliminaries		Semifinals		Final	
Athlete	Event	Points	Rank	Points	Rank	Points	Rank
Lauren Burch	1 m springboard	215.25	20	—N/a		Did not advance	
Lauren Burch	3 m springboard	206.60	41	Did not advance			
Elizabeth Miclau	10 m platform	225.40	33	Did not advance			
Maycey Vieta	10 m platform	296.50	9 Q	261.50	15	Did not advance	
Lauren Burch; Elizabeth Miclau	10 m synchro platform	—N/a				224.28	15

== Open water swimming ==
Men

Athlete	Event	Time	Rank
Christian Bayo	5 km	56:42.1	54
Christian Bayo	10 km	Did not finish	
Jamarr Bruno	5 km	55:19.5	46
Jamarr Bruno	10 km	2:01:52.5	67

Women

Athlete	Event	Time	Rank
Mariela Guadamuro	Women's 5 km	1:09:25.0	56
Mariela Guadamuro	Women's 10 km	2:22:31.3	66
Alondra Quiles	Women's 5 km	1:05:01.1	51
Alondra Quiles	Women's 10 km	2:17:38.8	61

Mixed

Athlete	Event	Time	Rank
Christian Bayo; Jamarr Bruno; Mariela Guadamuro; Alondra Quiles	Team relay	Did not start	

== Swimming ==
Puerto Rico entered 4 swimmer.

Men

Athlete	Event	Heat		Semifinal		Final	
Athlete	Event	Time	Rank	Time	Rank	Time	Rank
Jarod Arroyo	200 metre individual medley	2:04.83	28	Did not advance			
Jarod Arroyo	400 metre individual medley	Disqualified		—N/a		Did not advance	
Yeziel Morales	50 metre backstroke	26.17	28	Did not advance			
Yeziel Morales	100 metre backstroke	55.50	30	Did not advance			
Yeziel Morales	200 metre backstroke	1:59.38	17	Did not advance			
Yeziel Morales	100 metre butterfly	Did not start		Did not advance			
Yeziel Morales	200 metre butterfly	Did not start		Did not advance			
Xavier Ruiz	100 metre breaststroke	1:02.05	32	Did not advance			
Xavier Ruiz	200 metre breaststroke	2:14.71	20	Did not advance			

Women

Athlete	Event	Heat		Semifinal		Final	
Athlete	Event	Time	Rank	Time	Rank	Time	Rank
Kristen Romano	200 metre backstroke	2:14.46	20	Did not advance			
Kristen Romano	200 metre individual medley	2:14.24	12 Q	2:13.33	12	Did not advance	
Kristen Romano	400 metre individual medley	4:45.78	11	—N/a		Did not advance	
