= Puerto Rico at the 2023 World Aquatics Championships =

- Flag of Puerto Rico
- World Aquatics code: PUR
- National federation: Federación Puertorriqueña de Natación
- Website: natacionpr.org

in Fukuoka, Japan
- Competitors: 12 in 4 sports
- Medals: Gold 0 Silver 0 Bronze 0 Total 0

World Aquatics Championships appearances
- 1973; 1975; 1978; 1982; 1986; 1991; 1994; 1998; 2001; 2003; 2005; 2007; 2009; 2011; 2013; 2015; 2017; 2019; 2022; 2023; 2024; 2025

Puerto Rico is set to compete at the 2023 World Aquatics Championships in Fukuoka, Japan from 14 to 30 July.

== Artistic swimming ==
Puerto Rico entered 2 artistic swimmers.

Men

Athlete	Event	Preliminaries		Final	
Athlete	Event	Points	Rank	Points	Rank
Javier Ruisanchez	Solo technical routine	125.8333	10 Q	136.8817	9
Javier Ruisanchez	Solo free routine	104.5375	9 Q	103.7500	8

Mixed

Athlete	Event	Preliminaries		Final	
Athlete	Event	Points	Rank	Points	Rank
Javier Ruisanchez; Nicolle Torrens	Duet technical routine	165.3800	13	Did not advance	
Javier Ruisanchez; Nicolle Torrens	Duet free routine	90.0770	14	Did not advance	

== Diving ==
Puerto Rico entered 3 divers.

Men

Athlete	Event	Preliminaries		Semifinal		Final	
Athlete	Event	Points	Rank	Points	Rank	Points	Rank
Emanuel Vázquez	3 m springboard	332.50	40	Did not advance			
Emanuel Vázquez	10 m platform	368.50	20	Did not advance			

Women

Athlete	Event	Preliminaries		Semifinal		Final	
Athlete	Event	Points	Rank	Points	Rank	Points	Rank
Elizabeth Miclau	3 m springboard	193.05	46	Did not advance			
Elizabeth Miclau	10 m platform	207.60	34	Did not advance			
Maycey Vieta	10 m platform	244.00	29	Did not advance			

Mixed

Athlete	Event	Final	
Athlete	Event	Points	Rank
Emanuel Vázquez; Maycey Vieta	10 m synchronized platform	276.84	7

== Open water swimming ==
Puerto Rico entered 4 open water swimmer.

Men

Athlete	Event	Time	Rank
Christian Bayo	Men's 5 km	59:44.4	43
Christian Bayo	Men's 10 km	2:06:01.9	58
Jamarr Bruno	Men's 5 km	1:01:01.9	49
Jamarr Bruno	Men's 10 km	2:10:19.8	60

Women

Athlete	Event	Time	Rank
Mariela Guadamuro	Women's 5 km	1:10:32.8	52
Mariela Guadamuro	Women's 10 km	2:23:34.8	55
Alondra Quiles	Women's 5 km	1:07:14.4	49
Alondra Quiles	Women's 10 km	2:25:07.9	56

Mixed

Athlete	Event	Time	Rank
Christian Bayo; Jamarr Bruno; Mariela Guadamuro; Alondra Quiles	Team relay	1:23:21.2	20

== Swimming ==
Puerto Rico entered 3 swimmers.

Men

Athlete	Event	Heat		Semifinal		Final	
Athlete	Event	Time	Rank	Time	Rank	Time	Rank
Jarod Arroyo	200 metre individual medley	2:06.67	40	Did not advance			
Jarod Arroyo	400 metre individual medley	4:27.11	25	—N/a		Did not advance	
Yeziel Morales	200 metre backstroke	2:00.76	25	Did not advance			
Yeziel Morales	200 metre butterfly	1:59.10	25	Did not advance			

Women

Athlete	Event	Heat		Semifinal		Final	
Athlete	Event	Time	Rank	Time	Rank	Time	Rank
Kristen Romano	200 metre individual medley	2:13.94	20	Did not advance			
Kristen Romano	400 metre individual medley	4:48.24	23	—N/a		Did not advance	
