= Puerto Rico at the 2019 World Aquatics Championships =

- Flag of Puerto Rico
- World Aquatics code: PUR
- National federation: Federación Puertorriqueña de Natación
- Website: www.natacionpr.org

in Gwangju, South Korea
- Competitors: 6 in 2 sports
- Medals: Gold 0 Silver 0 Bronze 0 Total 0

World Aquatics Championships appearances
- 1973; 1975; 1978; 1982; 1986; 1991; 1994; 1998; 2001; 2003; 2005; 2007; 2009; 2011; 2013; 2015; 2017; 2019; 2022; 2023; 2024; 2025

Puerto Rico competed at the 2019 World Aquatics Championships in Gwangju, South Korea from 12 to 28 July.

== Diving ==
Puerto Rico entered one diver.

Men

Athlete	Event	Preliminaries		Semifinals		Final	
Athlete	Event	Points	Rank	Points	Rank	Points	Rank
Rafael Quintero	1 m springboard	352.00	12 Q	—N/a		360.80	11
Rafael Quintero	3 m springboard	396.70	18 Q	376.45	17	did not advance	
Rafael Quintero	10 m platform	397.65	15 Q	382.30	15	did not advance	

== Swimming ==
Puerto Rico entered five swimmers.

Men

Athlete	Event	Heat		Semifinal		Final	
Athlete	Event	Time	Rank	Time	Rank	Time	Rank
Jarod Arroyo	200 m butterfly	2:00.28	30	did not advance			
Jarod Arroyo	200 m individual medley	2:01.54	=24	did not advance			
Jarod Arroyo	400 m individual medley	4:18.94	18	—N/a		did not advance	
Christian Bayo	400 m freestyle	3:55.33	32	—N/a		did not advance	
Christian Bayo	800 m freestyle	8:08.78	28	—N/a		did not advance	
Yeziel Morales	200 m backstroke	2:01.13	28	did not advance			

Women

Athlete	Event	Heat		Semifinal		Final	
Athlete	Event	Time	Rank	Time	Rank	Time	Rank
Celismar Guzman	100 m backstroke	1:04.11	46	did not advance			
Kristen Romano	200 m individual medley	2:26.55	34	did not advance			
