= Puerto Rico at the 2017 World Aquatics Championships =

- Flag of Puerto Rico
- World Aquatics code: PUR
- National federation: Federación Puertorriqueña de Natación
- Website: www.natacionpr.org

in Budapest, Hungary
- Competitors: 4 in 2 sports
- Medals: Gold 0 Silver 0 Bronze 0 Total 0

World Aquatics Championships appearances
- 1973; 1975; 1978; 1982; 1986; 1991; 1994; 1998; 2001; 2003; 2005; 2007; 2009; 2011; 2013; 2015; 2017; 2019; 2022; 2023; 2024; 2025

Puerto Rico is scheduled to compete at the 2017 World Aquatics Championships in Budapest, Hungary from 14 to 30 July.

== Diving ==
Puerto Rico has entered 1 diver (one male).

Athlete	Event	Preliminaries		Semifinals		Final	
Athlete	Event	Points	Rank	Points	Rank	Points	Rank
Rafael Quintero	Men's 1 m springboard	285.90	40	—		did not advance	
Rafael Quintero	Men's 3 m springboard	386.70	25	did not advance			

== Swimming ==
Puerto Rican swimmers have achieved qualifying standards in the following events (up to a maximum of 2 swimmers in each event at the A-standard entry time, and 1 at the B-standard):

Athlete	Event	Heat		Semifinal		Final	
Athlete	Event	Time	Rank	Time	Rank	Time	Rank
Christian Bayo	Men's 400 m freestyle	3:55.15	34	—		did not advance	
Christian Bayo	Men's 1500 m freestyle	15:52.78	35	—		did not advance	
Luís Flores	Men's 50 m freestyle	22.83	44	did not advance			
Luís Flores	Men's 100 m freestyle	50.31	53	did not advance			
Yeziel Morales	Men's 200 m backstroke	2:05.11	37	did not advance			
