= Puerto Rico at the 2015 World Aquatics Championships =

- Flag of Puerto Rico
- World Aquatics code: PUR
- National federation: Federación Puertorriqueña de Natación
- Website: www.natacionpr.org

in Kazan, Russia
- Competitors: 6 in 2 sports
- Medals: Gold 0 Silver 0 Bronze 0 Total 0

World Aquatics Championships appearances
- 1973; 1975; 1978; 1982; 1986; 1991; 1994; 1998; 2001; 2003; 2005; 2007; 2009; 2011; 2013; 2015; 2017; 2019; 2022; 2023; 2024; 2025

Puerto Rico competed at the 2015 World Aquatics Championships in Kazan, Russia from 24 July to 9 August 2015.

== Diving ==
Puerto Rican divers qualified for the individual spots and synchronized teams at the World Championships.

Men

Athlete	Event	Preliminaries		Semifinals		Final	
Athlete	Event	Points	Rank	Points	Rank	Points	Rank
Rafael Quintero	1 m springboard	354.60	13	—N/a		Did not advance	
Rafael Quintero	10 m platform	367.45	31	Did not advance			

Women

Athlete	Event	Preliminaries		Semifinals		Final	
Athlete	Event	Points	Rank	Points	Rank	Points	Rank
Jeniffer Fernández	3 m springboard	244.70	32	Did not advance			
Luisa Jiménez	3 m springboard	221.25	40	Did not advance			
Jeniffer Fernández; Luisa Jiménez	3 m synchronized springboard	249.24	14	—N/a		Did not advance	

== Swimming ==
Puerto Rican swimmers have achieved qualifying standards in the following events (up to a maximum of 2 swimmers in each event at the A-standard entry time, and 1 at the B-standard):

Men

Athlete	Event	Heat		Semifinal		Final	
Athlete	Event	Time	Rank	Time	Rank	Time	Rank
Christian Bayo	400 m freestyle	3:53.61	41	—N/a		Did not advance	
Christian Bayo	1500 m freestyle	15:46.19	38	—N/a		Did not advance	
Christian Bayo	400 m individual medley	DNS		—N/a		Did not advance	
Luís Flores	50 m freestyle	23.29	=41	Did not advance			
Luís Flores	100 m freestyle	51.21	=59	Did not advance			
Yeziel Morales	200 m backstroke	2:04.15	31	Did not advance			
