= Puerto Rico at the 2022 World Aquatics Championships =

- Flag of Puerto Rico
- World Aquatics code: PUR
- National federation: Federación Puertorriqueña de Natación
- Website: www.natacionpr.org

in Budapest, Hungary 18 June 2022 – 3 July 2022
- Competitors: 11 in 4 sports
- Medals Ranked 0th: Gold 0 Silver 0 Bronze 0 Total 0

World Aquatics Championships appearances
- 1973; 1975; 1978; 1982; 1986; 1991; 1994; 1998; 2001; 2003; 2005; 2007; 2009; 2011; 2013; 2015; 2017; 2019; 2022; 2023; 2024; 2025

Puerto Rico competed at the 2022 World Aquatics Championships in Budapest, Hungary from 18 June to 3 July.

== Athletes by discipline ==
The following is the list of number of competitors participating at the Championships per discipline.

Sport	Men	Women	Total
Artistic swimming	1	1	2
Diving	1	2	3
Open water swimming	2	2	4
Swimming	1	1	2
Water polo	0	0	0
Total	5	6	11

== Artistic swimming ==
Mixed

Athlete	Event	Preliminaries		Final	
Athlete	Event	Points	Rank	Points	Rank
Javier Ruisanchez; Nicolle Torrens	Duet technical routine	65.5330	11 Q	65.8801	12
Javier Ruisanchez; Nicolle Torrens	Duet free routine	66.4000	11 Q	65.7000	11

== Diving ==
Men

Athlete	Event	Preliminaries		Semifinals		Final	
Athlete	Event	Points	Rank	Points	Rank	Points	Rank
Emanuel Vázquez	3 m springboard	358.60	23	did not advance			
Emanuel Vázquez	10 m platform	329.05	25	did not advance			

Women

Athlete	Event	Preliminaries		Semifinals		Final	
Athlete	Event	Points	Rank	Points	Rank	Points	Rank
Elizabeth Miclau	3 m springboard	187.15	35	did not advance			
Maycey Vieta	10 m platform	288.10	10 Q	280.90	13	did not advance	

== Open water swimming ==
Men

Athlete	Event	Time	Rank
Jamarr Bruno	5 km	OTL	
Jamarr Bruno	10 km	2:10:35.0	54
Diego Ortiz	5 km	OTL	
Diego Ortiz	10 km	2:18:44.0	57

Women

Athlete	Event	Time	Rank
Alondra Quiles	5 km	1:09:22.9	48
Alondra Quiles	10 km	2:26:11.8	56
Leandra Torres	5 km	1:07:12.3	45
Leandra Torres	10 km	2:24:08.4	55

Mixed

Athlete	Event	Time	Rank
Alondra Quiles; Leandra Torres; Jamarr Bruno; Diego Ortiz	Team	1:17:11.9	19

== Swimming ==
Men

Athlete	Event	Heat		Semifinal		Final	
Athlete	Event	Time	Rank	Time	Rank	Time	Rank
Yeziel Morales	50 m backstroke	26.23	33	did not advance			
Yeziel Morales	100 m backstroke	56.52	32	did not advance			
Yeziel Morales	200 m backstroke	1:59.77	16 Q	2:01.47	16	did not advance	

Women

Athlete	Event	Heat		Semifinal		Final	
Athlete	Event	Time	Rank	Time	Rank	Time	Rank
Kristen Romano	200 m backstroke	DSQ		did not advance			
Kristen Romano	200 m individual medley	2:18.89	29	did not advance			
Kristen Romano	400 m individual medley	4:56.39	16	—		did not advance	
