= Puerto Rico at the 2025 World Aquatics Championships =

- Flag of Puerto Rico
- World Aquatics code: PUR
- National federation: Federación Puertorriqueña de Natación
- Website: www.natacionpr.org

in Singapore
- Competitors: 7 in 2 sports
- Medals: Gold 0 Silver 0 Bronze 0 Total 0

World Aquatics Championships appearances
- 1973; 1975; 1978; 1982; 1986; 1991; 1994; 1998; 2001; 2003; 2005; 2007; 2009; 2011; 2013; 2015; 2017; 2019; 2022; 2023; 2024; 2025

Puerto Rico competed at the 2025 World Aquatics Championships in Singapore from July 11 to August 3, 2025.

== Competitors ==
The following is the list of competitors in the Championships.

Sport	Men	Women	Total
Open water swimming	1	1	2
Swimming	2	1	3
Total	3	2	5

== Open water swimming ==
Men

Athlete	Event	Heat		Semi-final		Final	
Athlete	Event	Time	Rank	Time	Rank	Time	Rank
Jamarr Bruno	Men's 3 km knockout sprints	Did not start		Did not advance			
Jamarr Bruno	Men's 5 km	—				1:02:40.8	42
Jamarr Bruno	Men's 10 km	—				2:19:19.8	54

Women

Athlete	Event	Heat		Semi-final		Final	
Athlete	Event	Time	Rank	Time	Rank	Time	Rank
Alondra Quiles	Women's 3 km knockout sprints	20:29.5	27	Did not advance			
Alondra Quiles	Women's 5 km	—				1:12:31.5	55
Alondra Quiles	Women's 10 km	—				2:35:11.6	52

== Swimming ==
Puerto Rico entered 3 swimmers.

Men

Athlete	Event	Heat		Semi-final		Final	
Athlete	Event	Time	Rank	Time	Rank	Time	Rank
Yeziel Morales	100 m backstroke	55.41	38	Did not advance			
Yeziel Morales	200 m backstroke	51.34	27	Did not advance			
Alexander Santiago	50 m freestyle	Did not start		Did not advance			
Alexander Santiago	50 m butterfly	24.11	40	Did not advance			

Women

Athlete	Event	Heat		Semi-final		Final	
Athlete	Event	Time	Rank	Time	Rank	Time	Rank
Kristen Romano	200 m backstroke	Did not start		Did not advance			
Kristen Romano	200 m individual medley	2:15.09	26	Did not advance			
Kristen Romano	400 m individual medley	5:04.08	23	—		Did not advance	
