= Puerto Rico at the 2013 World Aquatics Championships =

- Flag of Puerto Rico
- World Aquatics code: PUR
- National federation: Federación Puertorriqueña de Natación
- Website: www.natacionpr.org

in Barcelona, Spain
- Competitors: 4 in 2 sports
- Medals: Gold 0 Silver 0 Bronze 0 Total 0

World Aquatics Championships appearances
- 1973; 1975; 1978; 1982; 1986; 1991; 1994; 1998; 2001; 2003; 2005; 2007; 2009; 2011; 2013; 2015; 2017; 2019; 2022; 2023; 2024; 2025

Puerto Rico is competing at the 2013 World Aquatics Championships in Barcelona, Spain between 19 July and 4 August 2013.

== Diving ==
Puerto Rico qualified two quotas for the following diving events.

Women

Athlete	Event	Preliminaries		Semifinals		Final	
Athlete	Event	Points	Rank	Points	Rank	Points	Rank
Luisa Jiménez	1 m springboard	220.05	25	—N/a		did not advance	
Luisa Jiménez	3 m springboard	237.40	23	did not advance			

== Swimming ==
Puerto Rican swimmers achieved qualifying standards in the following events (up to a maximum of 2 swimmers in each event at the A-standard entry time, and 1 at the B-standard):

Men

Athlete	Event	Heat		Semifinal		Final	
Athlete	Event	Time	Rank	Time	Rank	Time	Rank
Eladio Carrión	100 m breaststroke	1:04.40	52	did not advance			
Eladio Carrión	200 m breaststroke	2:17.82	36	did not advance			
Yeziel Morales	400 m freestyle	4:02.28	40	—N/a		did not advance	
Yeziel Morales	200 m backstroke	2:06.09	30	did not advance			

Women

Athlete	Event	Heat		Semifinal		Final	
Athlete	Event	Time	Rank	Time	Rank	Time	Rank
Barbara Caraballo	50 m backstroke	29.80 NR	36	did not advance			
Barbara Caraballo	100 m butterfly	1:04.65	42	did not advance			
