= Swimming at the 2023 Pan American Games – Women's 200 metre breaststroke =

Women's 200 metre breaststroke at the 2023 Pan American Games
- Venue: Aquatic Center
- Date: October 23, 2023
- Competitors: 21 from 14 nations
- Winning time: 2:23.39

Medalists
Gold medal	Sydney Pickrem	Canada
Silver medal	Kelsey Wog	Canada
Bronze medal	Gabrielle Assis	Brazil

The women's 200 metre breaststroke competition of the swimming events at the 2023 Pan American Games were held on October 25, 2023, at the Aquatic Center in Santiago, Chile.

== Records ==
World record	Evgeniia Chikunova (RUS)	2:17.55	Kazan, Russia	April 21, 2023
Pan American Games record	Annie Lazor (USA)	2:21.40	Lima, Peru	August 8, 2023

== Results ==
KEY:	QA	Qualified for A final	QB	Qualified for B final	GR	Games record	NR	National record	PB	Personal best	SB	Seasonal best

=== Heats ===
The first round was held on October 25.

Rank	Heat	Lane	Name	Nationality	Time	Notes
1	3	4	Kelsey Wog	Canada	2:25.96	QA
2	3	5	Gabrielle Assis	Brazil	2:26.00	QA
3	1	4	Sydney Pickrem	Canada	2:28.35	QA
4	2	5	Macarena Ceballos	Argentina	2:29.19	QA
5	2	4	Anna Keating	United States	2:30.66	QA
6	2	3	Melissa Rodríguez	Mexico	2:31.65	QA
7	1	5	Emma Weber	United States	2:31.79	QA
8	3	6	Fernanda Jimenez	Mexico	2:32.82	QA
9	1	6	Mercedes Toledo	Venezuela	2:33.50	QB
10	3	3	Bruna Leme	Brazil	2:35.41	QB
11	2	2	Stefanía Gómez	Colombia	2:35.47	QB
12	2	6	Martina Barbeito	Argentina	2:37.10	QB
13	1	3	Emily Santos	Panama	2:37.67	QB
14	1	2	Antonia Cubillos	Chile	2:39.53	QB
15	3	7	Elisa Funes	El Salvador	2:39.59	QB
16	3	2	Valetina Marcantonio	Argentina	2:40.82	QB
17	2	7	Daysi Ramírez Garlobo	Cuba	2:41.72	
18	3	1	Nicole Mack	Independent Athletes Team	2:46.63	
19	1	7	Astrid Caballero	Paraguay	2:48.94	
20	1	1	Arantza Salazar	Chile	2:50.14	
21	2	1	Paola Cwu	Honduras	2:51.90	

=== Final B ===
The B final was also held on October 25.

Rank	Lane	Name	Nationality	Time	Notes
9	2	Emily Santos	Panama	2:31.90	
10	5	Bruna Leme	Brazil	2:32.59	
11	6	Martina Barbeito	Argentina	2:33.97	
12	4	Mercedes Toledo	Venezuela	2:35.42	
13	3	Stefanía Gómez	Colombia	2:35.46	
14	7	Antonia Cubillos	Chile	2:38.17	
15	8	Valetina Marcantonio	Argentina	2:39.33	
16	1	Elisa Funes	El Salvador	2:39.87	

=== Final A ===
The A final was also held on October 25.

Rank	Lane	Name	Nationality	Time	Notes
1st place, gold medalist(s)	3	Sydney Pickrem	Canada	2:23.39	
2nd place, silver medalist(s)	4	Kelsey Wog	Canada	2:23.49	
3rd place, bronze medalist(s)	5	Gabrielle Assis	Brazil	2:25.52	
4	6	Macarena Ceballos	Argentina	2:26.70	
5	7	Melissa Rodríguez	Mexico	2:28.13	
6	1	Emma Weber	United States	2:31.01	
7	2	Anna Keating	United States	2:31.14	
8	8	Fernanda Jimenez	Mexico	2:31.43	
