= 2021 FINA World Swimming Championships (25 m) – Women's 200 metre individual medley =

Swimming competition

Women's 200 metre individual medley at the 2021 FINA World Swimming Championships (25 m)
- Venue: Etihad Arena
- Location: Abu Dhabi, United Arab Emirates
- Dates: 20 December (heats and final)
- Competitors: 31 from 28 nations
- Winning time: 2:04.29

Medalists
gold medal	Sydney Pickrem	Canada
silver medal	Yu Yiting	China
bronze medal	Kate Douglass	United States

The Women's 200 metre individual medley competition of the 2021 FINA World Swimming Championships (25 m) was held on 20 December 2021.

== Records ==
Prior to the competition, the existing world and championship records were as follows.

World record	Katinka Hosszú (HUN)	2:01.86	Doha, Qatar	6 December 2014
Competition record	Katinka Hosszú (HUN)	2:01.86	Doha, Qatar	6 December 2014

== Results ==
=== Heats ===
The heats were started at 09:37.

Rank	Heat	Lane	Name	Nationality	Time	Notes
1	2	6	Kate Douglass	United States	2:04.24	Q
2	2	2	Yu Yiting	China	2:06.48	Q
3	4	4	Sydney Pickrem	Canada	2:06.66	Q
4	4	5	Bailey Andison	Canada	2:07.18	Q
5	4	3	Ilaria Cusinato	Italy	2:07.70	Q
6	3	4	Melanie Margalis	United States	2:08.16	Q
7	3	5	Maria Ugolkova	Switzerland	2:08.30	Q
8	4	7	Kim Seo-yeong	South Korea	2:08.60	Q
9	4	8	Ellen Walshe	Ireland	2:08.69	NR
10	3	0	Marrit Steenbergen	Netherlands	2:08.74	
11	3	3	Katie Shanahan	Great Britain	2:09.02	
12	2	5	Zsuzsanna Jakabos	Hungary	2:09.15	
13	3	2	Irina Shvaeva	Russian Swimming Federation	2:09.35	
14	4	9	Kristen Romano	Puerto Rico	2:09.72	NR
15	4	1	Lena Kreundl	Austria	2:09.76	
16	4	6	Kristýna Horská	Czech Republic	2:10.16	
17	3	7	Anastasiia Sorokina	Russian Swimming Federation	2:11.35	
18	4	2	Catalina Corró	Spain	2:11.60	
19	2	7	Nathalia Almeida	Brazil	2:11.74	
20	1	6	Anja Crevar	Serbia	2:12.04	
21	4	0	Diana Petkova	Bulgaria	2:12.59	NR
22	3	1	Chloe Cheng	Hong Kong	2:12.70	
23	2	9	Ieva Maļuka	Latvia	2:13.56	
24	3	9	Jinjutha Pholjamjumrus	Thailand	2:13.91	
25	1	4	Alexandra Dobrin	Romania	2:14.34	
25	1	7	Nicole Frank	Uruguay	2:14.34	NR
27	1	1	Alondra Ortíz	Costa Rica	2:15.00	
28	2	8	Florencia Perotti	Argentina	2:16.84	
29	1	5	Iman Avdić	Bosnia and Herzegovina	2:17.07	
30	3	8	Maria Romanjuk	Estonia	2:17.08	
31	1	2	Laura Melo	Colombia	2:18.68	NR
	1	3	McKenna DeBever	Peru	DNS	
	1	8	Georgia Damasioti	Greece	DNS	
	2	0	Quah Jing Wen	Singapore	DNS	
	2	1	Nikoleta Trníková	Slovakia	DNS	
	2	3	Costanza Cocconcelli	Italy	DNS	
	2	4	Anastasia Gorbenko	Israel	DNS	
	3	6	Viktoriya Zeynep Güneş	Turkey	DNS	

=== Final ===
The final was held at 18:07.

Rank	Lane	Name	Nationality	Time	Notes
1st place, gold medalist(s)	3	Sydney Pickrem	Canada	2:04.29	
2nd place, silver medalist(s)	5	Yu Yiting	China	2:04.48	NR, WJ
3rd place, bronze medalist(s)	4	Kate Douglass	United States	2:04.68	
4	7	Melanie Margalis	United States	2:06.02	
5	6	Bailey Andison	Canada	2:06.13	
6	2	Ilaria Cusinato	Italy	2:06.92	
7	1	Maria Ugolkova	Switzerland	2:07.26	
8	8	Kim Seo-yeong	South Korea	2:09.94	
