= Vietnam at the 2019 World Aquatics Championships =

- Flag of Vietnam
- World Aquatics code: VIE
- National federation: Vietnam Aquatic Sports Association

in Gwangju, South Korea
- Competitors: 7 in 1 sport
- Medals: Gold 0 Silver 0 Bronze 0 Total 0

World Aquatics Championships appearances
- 1973; 1975; 1978; 1982; 1986; 1991; 1994; 1998; 2001; 2003; 2005; 2007; 2009; 2011; 2013; 2015; 2017; 2019; 2022; 2023; 2024; 2025

Vietnam competed at the 2019 World Aquatics Championships in Gwangju, South Korea from 12 to 28 July.

== Swimming ==
Vietnam entered seven swimmers.

Men

Athlete	Event	Heat		Semifinal		Final	
Athlete	Event	Time	Rank	Time	Rank	Time	Rank
Nguyen Paul Le	50 m backstroke	25.73	32	did not advance			
Nguyen Paul Le	50 m butterfly	24.58	46	did not advance			
Nguyễn Hữu Kim Sơn	400 m freestyle	3:55.59	33	—N/a		did not advance	
Nguyễn Huy Hoàng	800 m freestyle	7:52.74	15	—N/a		did not advance	
Nguyễn Huy Hoàng	1500 m freestyle	15:02.35	14	—N/a		did not advance	
Phạm Thanh Bảo	200 m breaststroke	2:14.90	36	did not advance			
Trần Hưng Nguyễn	400 m individual medley	4:25.49	25	—N/a		did not advance	

Women

Athlete	Event	Heat		Semifinal		Final	
Athlete	Event	Time	Rank	Time	Rank	Time	Rank
Lê Thị Mỹ Thảo	200 m butterfly	2:13.11	22	did not advance			
Nguyễn Thị Ánh Viên	400 m freestyle	4:13.35	19	—N/a		did not advance	
Nguyễn Thị Ánh Viên	200 m individual medley	2:17.79	26	did not advance			
Nguyễn Thị Ánh Viên	400 m individual medley	4:47.96	19	—N/a		did not advance	
