= Vietnam at the 2013 World Aquatics Championships =

- Flag of Vietnam
- World Aquatics code: VIE
- National federation: Vietnam Aquatic Sports Association
- Website: vasa.vn

in Barcelona, Spain
- Competitors: 3 in 1 sports
- Medals: Gold 0 Silver 0 Bronze 0 Total 0

World Aquatics Championships appearances
- 1973; 1975; 1978; 1982; 1986; 1991; 1994; 1998; 2001; 2003; 2005; 2007; 2009; 2011; 2013; 2015; 2017; 2019; 2022; 2023; 2024; 2025

Vietnam is competing at the 2013 World Aquatics Championships in Barcelona, Spain between 19 July and 4 August 2013.

== Swimming ==
Vietnam qualified there quota places for the following swimming events.

Men

Athlete	Event	Heat		Semifinal		Final	
Athlete	Event	Time	Rank	Time	Rank	Time	Rank
Pham Thanh Nguyen	200 m freestyle	2:00.15	58	—N/a		did not advance	
Pham Thanh Nguyen	400 m freestyle	4:13.91	43	—N/a		did not advance	

Women

Athlete	Event	Heat		Semifinal		Final	
Athlete	Event	Time	Rank	Time	Rank	Time	Rank
Ngô Thị Ngọc Quỳnh	100 m breaststroke	DNS		did not advance			
Ngô Thị Ngọc Quỳnh	200 m breaststroke	DNS		did not advance			
Nguyễn Thị Ánh Viên	200 m backstroke	2:12.75	19	did not advance			
Nguyễn Thị Ánh Viên	400 m individual medley	4:47.60	21	—N/a		did not advance	
