= Swimming at the 2019 Pan American Games – Men's 100 metre backstroke =

Men's 100 metre backstroke at the 2019 Pan American Games
- Venue: Villa Deportiva Nacional, VIDENA
- Dates: August 8 (preliminaries and finals)
- Competitors: 23 from 21 nations

Medalists
Gold medal	Daniel Carr	United States
Silver medal	Guilherme Guido	Brazil
Bronze medal	Dylan Carter	Trinidad and Tobago

The men's 100 metre backstroke competition of the swimming events at the 2019 Pan American Games are scheduled to be held August 8, 2019 at the Villa Deportiva Nacional Videna cluster.

== Records ==
Prior to this competition, the existing world and Pan American Games records were as follows:

World record	Ryan Murphy (USA)	51.85	Rio de Janeiro, Brazil	August 13, 2016
Pan American Games record	Guilherme Guido (BRA)	53.12	Toronto, Canada	July 18, 2015

== Results ==
KEY:	q	Fastest non-qualifiers	Q	Qualified	GR	Games record	NR	National record	PB	Personal best	SB	Seasonal best

=== Heats ===
The first round will be held on August 8.

Rank	Heat	Lane	Name	Nationality	Time	Notes
1	2	4	Daniel Carr	United States	53.97	QA
2	1	4	Guilherme Guido	Brazil	54.52	QA
3	2	5	Nick Alexander	United States	54.68	QA
4	3	5	Dylan Carter	Trinidad and Tobago	54.95	QA
5	3	4	Javier Acevedo	Canada	55.51	QA
6	1	3	Charles Hockin	Paraguay	55.53	QA
7	1	5	Omar Pinzón	Colombia	55.55	QA
8	3	6	Jack Stewart Kirby	Barbados	56.08	QA
9	3	2	Patrick Groters	Aruba	56.20	QB, NR
10	2	6	Agustin Hernandez	Argentina	56.43	QB
11	1	6	Yeziel Morales	Puerto Rico	56.53	QB
12	2	3	Andy Xianyang Song An	Mexico	56.57	QB
13	3	3	Armando Barrera Aira	Cuba	56.94	WD
14	1	2	Maximiliano Valdovinos	Chile	58.30	QB
15	1	7	Jesus Lopez Yanez	Venezuela	58.32	QB
16	3	7	Carlos Cobos Davelouis	Peru	58.61	QB
17	2	7	Steven Cobos	Ecuador	58.76	QSO
17	2	1	Jose Neumann Doig	Peru	58.76	QSO
19	2	2	Matthew Mays	Virgin Islands	59.04	
20	1	1	Davantae Carey	Bahamas	59.45	
21	3	1	Hernán González	Panama	59.65	
22	2	8	Gabriel Castillo Sulca	Bolivia	1:00.12	
23	3	8	Eisner Barbarena	Nicaragua	1:00.52	

=== Swim-off ===
The swim-off was also held on August 8.

Rank	Lane	Name	Nationality	Time	Notes
17	4	Steven Cobos	Ecuador	58.26	QB
18	5	Jose Neumann Doig	Peru	58.77	

=== Final B ===
The B final was also held on August 8.

Rank	Lane	Name	Nationality	Time	Notes
9	3	Yeziel Morales	Puerto Rico	55.78	=NR
10	4	Patrick Groters	Aruba	55.82	NR
11	5	Agustin Hernandez	Argentina	56.15	
12	6	Andy Xianyang Song An	Mexico	56.43	
13	7	Jesus Lopez Yanez	Venezuela	58.11	
14	2	Maximiliano Valdovinos	Chile	58.29	
15	7	Carlos Cobos Davelouis	Peru	58.83	
16	8	Steven Cobos	Ecuador	59.02	

=== Final A ===
The A final was also held on August 8.

Rank	Lane	Name	Nationality	Time	Notes
1st place, gold medalist(s)	4	Daniel Carr	United States	53.50	
2nd place, silver medalist(s)	5	Guilherme Guido	Brazil	53.54	
3rd place, bronze medalist(s)	6	Dylan Carter	Trinidad and Tobago	54.42	
4	3	Nick Alexander	United States	54.76	
5	2	Javier Acevedo	Canada	55.14	
6	7	Charles Hockin	Paraguay	55.62	
7	1	Omar Pinzón	Colombia	55.83	
8	8	Jack Stewart Kirby	Barbados	56.38	
