= Swimming at the 2019 Pan American Games – Men's 200 metre backstroke =

Men's 200 metre backstroke at the 2019 Pan American Games
- Venue: Villa Deportiva Nacional, VIDENA
- Dates: August 7 (preliminaries and finals)
- Competitors: 23 from 19 nations

Medalists
Gold medal	Daniel Carr	United States
Silver medal	Nick Alexander	United States
Bronze medal	Leonardo de Deus	Brazil

The men's 200 metre backstroke competition of the swimming events at the 2019 Pan American Games are scheduled to be held August 7th, 2019 at the Villa Deportiva Nacional Videna cluster.

== Records ==
Prior to this competition, the existing world and Pan American Games records were as follows:

World record	Aaron Peirsol (USA)	1:51.92	Rome, Italy	July 31, 2009
Pan American Games record	Sean Lehane (USA)	1:57.11	Toronto, Canada	July 15, 2015

== Results ==
KEY:	q	Fastest non-qualifiers	Q	Qualified	GR	Games record	NR	National record	PB	Personal best	SB	Seasonal best

=== Heats ===
The first round will be held on August 7.

Rank	Heat	Lane	Name	Nationality	Time	Notes
1	1	4	Daniel Carr	United States	1:58.55	QA
2	3	4	Nick Alexander	United States	1:59.81	QA
3	1	3	Yeziel Morales	Puerto Rico	2:00.29	QA, NR
4	3	5	Javier Acevedo	Canada	2:01.19	QA
5	2	4	Leonardo de Deus	Brazil	2:01.51	QA
5	1	5	Brandonn Almeida	Brazil	2:01.51	QA
7	3	6	Anthony Rincón	Colombia	2:02.11	QA
8	1	6	Patrick Groters	Aruba	2:02.32	QA, NR
9	2	3	Omar Pinzón	Colombia	2:02.93	QB
10	2	5	Andy Xianyang Song An	Mexico	2:03.50	QB
11	2	6	Erick Gordillo Guzmán	Guatemala	2:04.36	QB
12	3	3	Armando Barrera Aira	Cuba	2:04.39	QB
13	2	2	Agustin Hernandez	Argentina	2:04.93	QB
14	3	7	Jack Stewart Kirby	Barbados	2:05.59	QB
15	1	7	Carlos Cobos Davelouis	Peru	2:06.53	QB
16	1	2	Steven Cobos	Ecuador	2:07.03	QB
17	3	2	Matías López	Paraguay	2:07.30	
18	2	1	Matthew Mays	Virgin Islands	2:08.00	
19	3	1	Jose Neumann Doig	Peru	2:08.36	
20	2	7	Jesus Lopez Yanez	Venezuela	2:09.51	
21	1	1	Maximiliano Valdovinos	Chile	2:10.27	
22	3	8	Hernán González	Panama	2:11.84	
23	2	8	Eisner Barbarena	Nicaragua	2:15.83	

=== Final B ===
The B final was also held on August 7.

Rank	Lane	Name	Nationality	Time	Notes
9	5	Andy Xianyang Song An	Mexico	2:02.95	
10	4	Omar Pinzón	Colombia	2:03.75	
11	3	Erick Gordillo Guzmán	Guatemala	2:04.88	
12	6	Armando Barrera Aira	Cuba	2:05.15	
13	2	Agustin Hernandez	Argentina	2:05.52	
14	8	Steven Cobos	Ecuador	2:05.89	
15	1	Carlos Cobos Davelouis	Peru	2:06.84	
16	7	Jack Stewart Kirby	Barbados	2:07.66	

=== Final A ===
The A final was also held on August 7.

Rank	Lane	Name	Nationality	Time	Notes
1st place, gold medalist(s)	4	Daniel Carr	United States	1:58.13	
2nd place, silver medalist(s)	5	Nick Alexander	United States	1:58.30	
3rd place, bronze medalist(s)	2	Leonardo de Deus	Brazil	1:58.73	
4	6	Javier Acevedo	Canada	1:59.70	
5	3	Yeziel Morales	Puerto Rico	2:00.27	NR
6	7	Brandonn Almeida	Brazil	2:01.51	
7	1	Anthony Rincón	Colombia	2:02.46	
8	8	Patrick Groters	Aruba	2:03.65	
