= Swimming at the 2023 World Aquatics Championships – Women's 200 metre individual medley =

Women's 200 metre individual medley at the 2023 World Aquatics Championships
- Venue: Marine Messe Fukuoka
- Location: Fukuoka, Japan
- Dates: 23 July (heats and semifinals); 24 July (final)
- Competitors: 34 from 28 nations
- Winning time: 2:07.17

Medalists
gold medal	Kate Douglass	United States
silver medal	Alexandra Walsh	United States
bronze medal	Yu Yiting	China

The women's 200 metre individual medley competition at the 2023 World Aquatics Championships was held on 23 and 24 July 2023.

== Records ==
Prior to the competition, the existing world and championship records were as follows.

World record	Katinka Hosszú (HUN)	2:06.12	Kazan, Russia	3 August 2015
Competition record	Katinka Hosszú (HUN)	2:06.12	Kazan, Russia	3 August 2015

== Results ==
=== Heats ===
The heats were held on 23 July at 10:32.

Rank	Heat	Lane	Name	Nationality	Time	Notes
1	4	4	Kate Douglass	United States	2:09.17	Q
2	2	4	Kaylee McKeown	Australia	2:09.50	Q
3	2	3	Mary-Sophie Harvey	Canada	2:09.65	Q
3	3	4	Alexandra Walsh	United States	2:09.65	Q
5	4	5	Yu Yiting	China	2:09.66	Q
6	4	3	Jenna Forrester	Australia	2:09.79	Q
7	2	6	Ye Shiwen	China	2:09.81	Q
8	4	6	Sara Franceschi	Italy	2:10.68	Q
9	2	2	Yui Ohashi	Japan	2:10.80	Q
10	2	5	Anastasia Gorbenko	Israel	2:10.88	Q
11	4	7	Rebecca Meder	South Africa	2:10.95	Q, NR
12	3	3	Katie Shanahan	Great Britain	2:11.26	Q
13	3	5	Marrit Steenbergen	Netherlands	2:11.31	Q
14	3	6	Kim Seo-yeong	South Korea	2:11.50	Q
15	3	2	Mio Narita	Japan	2:11.69	Q
16	4	8	Ellen Walshe	Ireland	2:12.83	Q
17	2	7	Fantine Lesaffre	France	2:13.28	
17	4	2	Charlotte Bonnet	France	2:13.28	
19	3	7	Dalma Sebestyén	Hungary	2:13.32	
20	3	8	Kristen Romano	Puerto Rico	2:13.94	
21	4	1	Lea Polonsky	Israel	2:14.05	
22	3	1	Emma Carrasco	Spain	2:15.11	
23	1	4	Ieva Maļuka	Latvia	2:15.33	NR
24	2	8	Tamara Potocká	Slovakia	2:15.41	
25	2	1	Bruna Monteiro	Brazil	2:15.65	
26	4	0	Letitia Sim	Singapore	2:17.20	
27	2	0	Stefanía Gómez	Colombia	2:17.21	
28	2	9	McKenna DeBever	Peru	2:17.33	
29	3	0	Florencia Perotti	Argentina	2:17.73	
30	4	9	Kamonchanok Kwanmuang	Thailand	2:18.02	
31	1	3	Alondra Ortiz	Costa Rica	2:19.91	
32	3	9	Chloe Cheng	Hong Kong	2:21.25	
33	1	5	Nicole Frank	Uruguay	2:21.89	
34	1	6	Zaylie Thompson	Bahamas	2:25.36	

=== Semifinals ===
The semifinals were held on 22 July at 21:01.

Rank	Heat	Lane	Name	Nationality	Time	Notes
1	1	5	Alexandra Walsh	United States	2:08.27	Q
2	2	3	Yu Yiting	China	2:09.04	Q
3	2	1	Marrit Steenbergen	Netherlands	2:09.30	Q
4	1	3	Jenna Forrester	Australia	2:10.03	Q
5	2	2	Yui Ohashi	Japan	2:10.32	Q
6	2	4	Kate Douglass	United States	2:10.38	Q
7	2	6	Ye Shiwen	China	2:10.57	Q
8	1	2	Anastasia Gorbenko	Israel	2:10.62	Q
9	1	8	Ellen Walshe	Ireland	2:10.92	
10	2	7	Rebecca Meder	South Africa	2:11.16	
11	2	5	Mary-Sophie Harvey	Canada	2:11.47	
12	2	8	Mio Narita	Japan	2:12.24	
13	1	1	Kim Seo-yeong	South Korea	2:12.91	
	1	4	Kaylee McKeown	Australia	DSQ	
	1	6	Sara Franceschi	Italy	DSQ	
	1	7	Katie Shanahan	Great Britain	DSQ	

=== Final ===
The final was held on 23 July at 21:23.

Rank	Lane	Name	Nationality	Time	Notes
1st place, gold medalist(s)	7	Kate Douglass	United States	2:07.17	
2nd place, silver medalist(s)	4	Alexandra Walsh	United States	2:07.97	
3rd place, bronze medalist(s)	5	Yu Yiting	China	2:08.74	
4	6	Jenna Forrester	Australia	2:08.98	
5	8	Anastasia Gorbenko	Israel	2:10.08	
6	2	Yui Ohashi	Japan	2:11.27	
7	3	Marrit Steenbergen	Netherlands	2:11.89	
8	1	Ye Shiwen	China	2:14.27	
