= Vietnam at the 2015 World Aquatics Championships =

- Flag of Vietnam
- FINA code: VIE
- National federation: Vietnam Aquatic Sports Association
- Website: vasa.vn

in Kazan, Russia
- Competitors: 5 in 1 sport
- Medals: Gold 0 Silver 0 Bronze 0 Total 0

World Aquatics Championships appearances
- 1973; 1975; 1978; 1982; 1986; 1991; 1994; 1998; 2001; 2003; 2005; 2007; 2009; 2011; 2013; 2015; 2017; 2019; 2022; 2023; 2024

Vietnam competed at the 2015 World Aquatics Championships in Kazan, Russia from 24 July to 9 August 2015.

== Swimming ==
Vietnamese swimmers have achieved qualifying standards in the following events (up to a maximum of 2 swimmers in each event at the A-standard entry time, and 1 at the B-standard):

Men

Athlete	Event	Heat		Semifinal		Final	
Athlete	Event	Time	Rank	Time	Rank	Time	Rank
Hoàng Quý Phước	100 m freestyle	51.21	=59	Did not advance			
Hoàng Quý Phước	200 m freestyle	1:54.31	63	Did not advance			
Hoàng Quý Phước	100 m butterfly	DNS		Did not advance			
Lâm Quang Nhật	1500 m freestyle	15:54.56	41	—		Did not advance	
Lê Nguyễn Paul	50 m backstroke	26.14	36	Did not advance			
Lê Nguyễn Paul	100 m backstroke	56.95	44	Did not advance			
Lê Nguyễn Paul	200 m backstroke	2:04.78	32	Did not advance			
Trần Duy Khôi	200 m individual medley	2:04.30	31	Did not advance			
Trần Duy Khôi	400 m individual medley	4:27.43	35	—		Did not advance	

Women

Athlete	Event	Heat		Semifinal		Final	
Athlete	Event	Time	Rank	Time	Rank	Time	Rank
Nguyễn Thị Ánh Viên	200 m freestyle	2:00.80	31	Did not advance			
Nguyễn Thị Ánh Viên	200 m individual medley	2:13.41	16 Q	2:13.29	15	Did not advance	
Nguyễn Thị Ánh Viên	400 m individual medley	4:38.78	10	Did not advance			
