= Swimming at the 2023 World Aquatics Championships – Men's 400 metre individual medley =

Men's 400 metre individual medley at the 2023 World Aquatics Championships
- Venue: Marine Messe Fukuoka
- Location: Fukuoka, Japan
- Dates: 23 July (heats and final)
- Competitors: 29 from 23 nations
- Winning time: 4:02.50 WR

Medalists
gold medal	Léon Marchand	France
silver medal	Carson Foster	United States
bronze medal	Daiya Seto	Japan

The men's 400 metre individual medley competition at the 2023 World Aquatics Championships was held on 23 July 2023.

== Records ==
Prior to the competition, the existing world and championship records were as follows.

World record	Michael Phelps (USA)	4:03.84	Beijing, China	10 August 2008
Competition record	Léon Marchand (FRA)	4:04.28	Budapest, Hungary	18 June 2022

The following new records were set during this competition.

Date	Event	Name	Nationality	Time	Record
23 July	Final	Léon Marchand	France	4:02.50	WR

== Results ==
=== Heats ===
The heats were started at 12:52.

Rank	Heat	Lane	Name	Nationality	Time	Notes
1	2	4	Carson Foster	United States	4:09.83	Q
2	3	4	Léon Marchand	France	4:10.88	Q
3	2	5	Daiya Seto	Japan	4:10.89	Q
4	2	6	Alberto Razzetti	Italy	4:11.57	Q
5	2	3	Brendon Smith	Australia	4:11.75	Q
6	3	5	Chase Kalisz	United States	4:12.37	Q
7	3	2	Balázs Holló	Hungary	4:12.77	Q
8	3	3	Lewis Clareburt	New Zealand	4:12.85	Q
9	2	1	Lorne Wigginton	Canada	4:13.75	
10	3	7	Apostolos Papastamos	Greece	4:14.52	
11	2	7	Thomas Neill	Australia	4:14.98	
12	2	8	Thomas Jansen	Netherlands	4:16.00	
13	3	0	Collyn Gagne	Canada	4:16.08	
14	3	6	Tomoru Honda	Japan	4:16.71	
15	1	2	Erik Gordillo	Guatemala	4:20.17	
16	3	8	Stephan Steverink	Brazil	4:21.22	
17	1	6	Marius Toscan	Switzerland	4:21.24	
18	1	5	Héctor Ruvalcaba	Mexico	4:21.25	
19	2	0	Ádám Telegdy	Hungary	4:21.29	
20	3	1	Luan Grobbelaar	New Zealand	4:21.54	
21	2	9	Kim Min-suk	South Korea	4:22.17	
22	3	9	Richard Nagy	Slovakia	4:22.96	
23	1	3	Nguyễn Quang Thuấn	Vietnam	4:25.92	
24	1	7	Tan Khai Xin	Malaysia	4:26.83	
25	1	8	Jarod Arroyo	Puerto Rico	4:27.11	
26	1	1	Munzer Kabbara	Lebanon	4:28.66	
27	1	9	Kristaps Mikelsons	Latvia	4:36.22	
	1	0	Fu Kun-ming	Chinese Taipei	DSQ	
	2	2	Wang Shun	China	DSQ	
	1	4	Jaouad Syoud	Algeria	DNS	

=== Final ===
The final was started at 21:21.

Rank	Lane	Name	Nationality	Time	Notes
1st place, gold medalist(s)	5	Léon Marchand	France	4:02.50	WR
2nd place, silver medalist(s)	4	Carson Foster	United States	4:06.56	
3rd place, bronze medalist(s)	3	Daiya Seto	Japan	4:09.41	
4	7	Chase Kalisz	United States	4:10.23	
5	2	Brendon Smith	Australia	4:10.37	
6	8	Lewis Clareburt	New Zealand	4:11.29	
7	6	Alberto Razzetti	Italy	4:11.73	
8	1	Balázs Holló	Hungary	4:13.36	
