= Vietnam at the 2023 World Aquatics Championships =

- Flag of Vietnam
- FINA code: VIE
- National federation: Vietnam Aquatic Sports Association

in Fukuoka, Japan
- Competitors: 10 in 1 sport
- Medals: Gold 0 Silver 0 Bronze 0 Total 0

World Aquatics Championships appearances
- 1973; 1975; 1978; 1982; 1986; 1991; 1994; 1998; 2001; 2003; 2005; 2007; 2009; 2011; 2013; 2015; 2017; 2019; 2022; 2023; 2024

Vietnam is set to compete at the 2023 World Aquatics Championships in Fukuoka, Japan from 14 to 30 July.

== Swimming ==
Vietnam entered 10 swimmers.

Men

Athlete	Event	Heat		Semifinal		Final	
Athlete	Event	Time	Rank	Time	Rank	Time	Rank
Đỗ Ngọc Vĩnh	400 metre freestyle	4:02.05	36	—		Did not advance	
Hồ Nguyễn Duy Khoa	200 metre butterfly	2:11.47	36	Did not advance			
Hoàng Quý Phước	200 metre freestyle	1:53.67	46	Did not advance			
Luong Jérémie Loïc Nino	50 metre freestyle	23.39	61	Did not advance			
Luong Jérémie Loïc Nino	100 metre freestyle	51.34	62	Did not advance			
Luong Jérémie Loïc Nino	50 metre butterfly	24.56	54	Did not advance			
Mai Trần Tuấn Anh	800 metre freestyle	8:08.56	32	—		Did not advance	
Nguyễn Hữu Kim Sơn	1500 metre freestyle	16:20.45	27	—		Did not advance	
Nguyễn Quang Thuấn	400 metre individual medley	4:25.92	23	—		Did not advance	
Phạm Thanh Bảo	50 metre breaststroke	29.17	45	Did not advance			
Phạm Thanh Bảo	100 metre breaststroke	1:03.37	46	Did not advance			
Phạm Thanh Bảo	200 metre breaststroke	2:17.89	34	Did not advance			
Trần Hưng Nguyên	200 metre backstroke	2:07.40	34	Did not advance			
Trần Hưng Nguyên	200 metre individual medley	2:05.77	35	Did not advance			
Hoàng Quý Phước; Luong Jérémie Loïc Nino; Trần Hưng Nguyên; Nguyễn Quang Thuấn	4 × 100 m freestyle relay	3:27.63	21	—		Did not advance	
Do Ngoc Vinh; Nguyễn Hữu Kim Sơn; Mai Tran Tuan Anh; Nguyen Quang Thuan	4 × 200 m freestyle relay	7:44.33	17	—		Did not advance	
|Mai Trần Tuấn Anh; Phạm Thanh Bảo; Hồ Nguyễn Duy Khoa; Luong Jérémie Loïc Nino	4 × 100 m medley relay	3:56.18	22	—		Did not advance	

Women

Athlete	Event	Heat		Semifinal		Final	
Athlete	Event	Time	Rank	Time	Rank	Time	Rank
Võ Thị Mỹ Tiên	400 metre freestyle	4:23.21	34	—		Did not advance	
Võ Thị Mỹ Tiên	800 metre freestyle	9:15.23	34	—		Did not advance	
Võ Thị Mỹ Tiên	1500 metre freestyle	17:25.13	30	—		Did not advance	
