= Gabrielle Assis =

Brazilian swimmer (born 1999)

Personal information
- Full name: Gabrielle Assis da Silva
- Born: 5 May 1999 (age 27) São Paulo, Brazil

Sport
- Sport: Swimming
Medal record
Women's swimming
Representing Brazil
Pan American Games
| Bronze medal – third place | 2023 Santiago | 200 m breaststroke |
South American Games
| Gold medal – first place | 2022 Asunción | 200 m breaststroke |

Gabrielle Assis da Silva (born 5 May 1999) is a Brazilian swimmer. She finished 7th in the 200m breaststroke at the 2024 World Championships.

== Career ==
Assis has been swimming since she was 6 years old. She arrived at Clube Atlético Juventus in 2010, brought by her sister.

At the 2022 South American Games, she won a gold medal in the 200 metre breaststroke.

In April 2023, she broke the Brazilian record for the 200m breaststroke for the first time, with a time of 2:26.38, erasing the mark held by Carolina Mussi since 5 May 2009, 2:27.42.

At the 2023 World Aquatics Championships, she broke the Brazilian record for the 200m breaststroke at heats, with a time of 2:25.18. This was the first time in history that a Brazilian swimmer reached the semifinals of the 200m breaststroke. She finished 12th in the semifinals.

At the 2023 Pan American Games, she won a bronze medal in the Women's 200 metre breaststroke.

At the 2024 World Aquatics Championships, she finished 9th in the Women's 200 metre breaststroke semifinals. Due to the withdrawal of the Lithuanian Kotryna Teterevkova, Assis qualified for the final of the race, becoming the first Brazilian in history to swim the final of the women's 200m breaststroke at the World Championships. In the final, she finished in 7th place.
