= Swimming at the 2024 World Aquatics Championships – Women's 200 metre breaststroke =

Women's 200 metre breaststroke at the Swimming at the 2024 World Aquatics Championships
- Venue: Aspire Dome
- Location: Doha, Qatar
- Dates: 15 February (heats and semifinals); 16 February (final)
- Competitors: 31 from 30 nations
- Winning time: 2:19.81

Medalists
gold medal	Tes Schouten	Netherlands
silver medal	Kate Douglass	United States
bronze medal	Sydney Pickrem	Canada

The Women's 200 metre breaststroke competition at the 2024 World Aquatics Championships was held on 15 and 16 February 2024.

== Qualification ==
Each National Federation was permitted to enter a maximum of two qualified athletes in each individual event, but only if both of them had attained the "A" standard qualification time at approved qualifying events. For this event, the "A" standard qualification time was 2:25.91. Federations could enter one athlete into the event if they met the "B" standard qualification time. For this event, the "B" standard qualification time was 2:31.02. Athletes could also enter the event if they had met an "A" or "B" standard in a different event and their Federation had not entered anyone else. Additional considerations applied to Federations who had few swimmers enter through the standard qualification times. Federations in this category could at least enter two men and two women into the competition, all of whom could enter into up to two events.

== Records ==
Prior to the competition, the existing world and championship records were as follows.

World record	Evgeniia Chikunova (RUS)	2:17.55	Kazan, Russia	21 April 2023
Competition record	Rikke Møller Pedersen (DEN)	2:19.11	Barcelona, Spain	1 August 2013

== Results ==
=== Heats ===
The heats were started on 15 February at 10:11.

Rank	Heat	Lane	Name	Nationality	Time	Notes
1	4	4	Kate Douglass	United States	2:24.15	Q
2	2	6	Mona McSharry	Ireland	2:24.82	Q
3	2	4	Kotryna Teterevkova	Lithuania	2:25.09	Q
4	4	5	Sydney Pickrem	Canada	2:25.18	Q
5	3	4	Tes Schouten	Netherlands	2:25.90	Q
6	4	3	Francesca Fangio	Italy	2:26.01	Q
7	4	6	Gabrielle Assis	Brazil	2:26.28	Q
8	1	3	Alina Zmushka	Neutral Independent Athletes	2:26.31	Q
9	3	3	Kristýna Horská	Czech Republic	2:26.71	Q
10	2	5	Letitia Sim	Singapore	2:27.08	Q
11	2	3	Lisa Mamié	Switzerland	2:27.42	Q
12	2	7	Nayara Pineda	Spain	2:27.45	Q
13	2	2	Ana Blažević	Croatia	2:27.51	Q
14	3	7	Moon Su-a	South Korea	2:27.53	Q
15	4	1	Eleni Kontogeorgou	Greece	2:28.53	Q
16	2	1	Melissa Rodríguez	Mexico	2:28.90	Q
17	4	7	Macarena Ceballos	Argentina	2:28.94	
18	4	2	Grace Palmer	Belgium	2:29.03	
19	3	2	Sara Franceschi	Italy	2:30.01	
20	2	8	Emily Santos	Panama	2:31.36	
21	3	1	Nikoleta Trníková	Slovakia	2:31.52	
22	3	5	Abbey Harkin	Australia	2:31.93	
23	3	8	Ida Hulkko	Finland	2:33.27	
24	1	5	Stephanie Iannaccone	Guatemala	2:33.77	NR
25	4	0	Lam Hoi Kiu	Hong Kong	2:36.19	
26	3	0	Nadia Tudo	Andorra	2:37.70	
27	4	9	Tara Aloul	Jordan	2:43.10	
28	2	0	Kelera Mudunasoko	Fiji	2:46.29	
29	1	4	Maria Batallones	Northern Mariana Islands	2:54.73	
	3	6	Sophie Hansson	Sweden	Did not start	
	4	8	Martina Bukvić	Serbia	Did not start	

=== Semifinals ===
The semifinals were held on 15 February at 20:19.

Rank	Heat	Lane	Name	Nationality	Time	Notes
1	2	3	Tes Schouten	Netherlands	2:21.50	Q, NR
2	2	4	Kate Douglass	United States	2:23.17	Q
3	1	5	Sydney Pickrem	Canada	2:23.77	Q
4	1	6	Alina Zmushka	Neutral Independent Athletes	2:24.14	Q, NR
5	2	7	Lisa Mamié	Switzerland	2:24.62	Q
6	2	5	Kotryna Teterevkova	Lithuania	2:24.69	Q→WD
7	1	4	Mona McSharry	Ireland	2:25.13	Q
8	2	2	Kristýna Horská	Czech Republic	2:25.34	Q
9	2	6	Gabrielle Assis	Brazil	2:25.62	Q
10	1	3	Francesca Fangio	Italy	2:26.39	
11	1	1	Moon Su-a	South Korea	2:26.76	
12	1	2	Letitia Sim	Singapore	2:27.04	
13	2	8	Eleni Kontogeorgou	Greece	2:28.14	
14	2	1	Ana Blažević	Croatia	2:28.48	
15	1	8	Melissa Rodríguez	Mexico	2:29.18	
16	1	7	Nayara Pineda	Spain	2:29.74	

=== Final ===
The final was held on 16 February at 19:49.

Rank	Lane	Name	Nationality	Time	Notes
1st place, gold medalist(s)	4	Tes Schouten	Netherlands	2:19.81	NR
2nd place, silver medalist(s)	5	Kate Douglass	United States	2:20.91	
3rd place, bronze medalist(s)	3	Sydney Pickrem	Canada	2:22.94	
4	6	Alina Zmushka	Neutral Independent Athletes	2:24.44	
5	1	Mona McSharry	Ireland	2:24.89	
6	8	Kristýna Horská	Czech Republic	2:25.34	
7	7	Gabrielle Assis	Brazil	2:25.66	
8	2	Lisa Mamié	Switzerland	2:26.23	

== Sources ==
- "Competition Regulations" (PDF). World Aquatics. Archived (PDF) from the original on 15 February 2026.
