= Swimming at the 2019 World Aquatics Championships – Women's 200 metre individual medley =

Women's 200 metre individual medley at the 2019 World Aquatics Championships
- Venue: Nambu University Municipal Aquatics Center
- Location: Gwangju, South Korea
- Dates: 21 July (heats and semifinals); 22 July (final)
- Competitors: 36 from 30 nations
- Winning time: 2:07.53

Medalists
gold medal	Katinka Hosszú	Hungary
silver medal	Ye Shiwen	China
bronze medal	Sydney Pickrem	Canada

The Women's 200 metre individual medley competition at the 2019 World Championships was held on 21 and 22 July 2019.

== Records ==
Prior to the competition, the existing world and championship records were as follows.

World record	Katinka Hosszú (HUN)	2:06.12	Kazan, Russia	3 August 2015
Competition record	Katinka Hosszú (HUN)	2:06.12	Kazan, Russia	3 August 2015

== Results ==
=== Heats ===
The heats were held on 21 July at 10:00.

Rank	Heat	Lane	Name	Nationality	Time	Notes
1	3	4	Katinka Hosszú	Hungary	2:07.02	Q
2	3	5	Ye Shiwen	China	2:09.45	Q
3	2	5	Melanie Margalis	United States	2:09.69	Q
4	4	5	Sydney Pickrem	Canada	2:10.34	Q
5	2	3	Rika Omoto	Japan	2:10.50	Q
6	3	6	Kelsey Wog	Canada	2:10.54	Q
7	4	3	Siobhan-Marie O'Connor	Great Britain	2:10.99	Q
8	3	3	Ella Eastin	United States	2:11.06	Q
9	4	4	Yui Ohashi	Japan	2:11.09	Q
10	2	4	Kim Seo-yeong	South Korea	2:11.45	Q
11	4	7	Anastasia Gorbenko	Israel	2:11.92	Q, NR
12	4	6	Ilaria Cusinato	Italy	2:12.16	Q
13	3	2	Fantine Lesaffre	France	2:12.34	Q
14	2	6	Maria Ugolkova	Switzerland	2:12.35	Q
15	4	1	Viktoriya Zeynep Güneş	Turkey	2:12.42	Q
16	2	2	Yu Yiting	China	2:12.98	Q
17	3	1	Zsuzsanna Jakabos	Hungary	2:13.29	
18	3	7	Aimee Willmott	Great Britain	2:13.90	
19	3	8	Victoria Kaminskaya	Portugal	2:13.97	
20	2	7	Viktoriya Belyakova	Russia	2:14.65	
21	4	2	Mireia Belmonte	Spain	2:17.93	
22	4	8	Rebecca Meder	South Africa	2:15.96	
23	4	9	Jenna Laukkanen	Finland	2:16.28	
24	2	8	Neža Klančar	Slovenia	2:16.53	
25	3	0	McKenna DeBever	Peru	2:16.97	
26	4	0	Nguyễn Thị Ánh Viên	Vietnam	2:17.79	
27	2	1	Barbora Závadová	Czech Republic	2:18.34	
28	3	9	Claudia Gadea	Romania	2:19.03	
29	2	9	Aleksandra Knop	Poland	2:20.18	
30	1	4	Alexandra Schegoleva	Cyprus	2:20.66	
31	1	3	Julimar Avila	Honduras	2:20.93	
32	1	5	Mya Azzopardi	Malta	2:25.24	
33	1	6	Nicole Frank	Uruguay	2:26.49	
34	2	0	Kristen Romano	Puerto Rico	2:26.55	
35	1	2	Claudia Verdino	Monaco	2:30.68	
36	1	7	Kaya Forson	Ghana	2:34.59	NR

=== Semifinals ===
The semifinals were held on 21 July at 21:02.

==== Semifinal 1 ====
Rank	Lane	Name	Nationality	Time	Notes
1	5	Sydney Pickrem	Canada	2:08.83	Q
2	4	Ye Shiwen	China	2:09.58	Q
3	2	Kim Seo-yeong	South Korea	2:10.21	Q
4	1	Maria Ugolkova	Switzerland	2:10.72	NR
5	6	Ella Eastin	United States	2:10.72	
6	8	Yu Yiting	China	2:11.60	
7	7	Ilaria Cusinato	Italy	2:12.12	
8	3	Kelsey Wog	Canada	2:12.96	

==== Semifinal 2 ====
Rank	Lane	Name	Nationality	Time	Notes
1	4	Katinka Hosszú	Hungary	2:07.17	Q
2	5	Melanie Margalis	United States	2:09.14	Q
3	3	Rika Omoto	Japan	2:09.68	Q
4	2	Yui Ohashi	Japan	2:10.04	Q
5	6	Siobhan-Marie O'Connor	Great Britain	2:10.49	Q
6	1	Fantine Lesaffre	France	2:12.18	
7	8	Viktoriya Zeynep Güneş	Turkey	2:12.40	
8	7	Anastasia Gorbenko	Israel	2:13.90	

=== Final ===
The final was held on 22 July at 21:25.

Rank	Lane	Name	Nationality	Time	Notes
1st place, gold medalist(s)	4	Katinka Hosszú	Hungary	2:07.53	
2nd place, silver medalist(s)	6	Ye Shiwen	China	2:08.60	
3rd place, bronze medalist(s)	5	Sydney Pickrem	Canada	2:08.70	
4	3	Melanie Margalis	United States	2:08.91	
5	2	Rika Omoto	Japan	2:09.32	
6	1	Kim Seo-yeong	South Korea	2:10.12	
7	8	Siobhan-Marie O'Connor	Great Britain	2:10.43	
	7	Yui Ohashi	Japan	DSQ	
