= Vietnam at the 2024 World Aquatics Championships =

- Flag of Vietnam
- FINA code: VIE
- National federation: Vietnam Aquatic Sports Association

in Doha, Qatar
- Competitors: 6 in 1 sport
- Medals: Gold 0 Silver 0 Bronze 0 Total 0

World Aquatics Championships appearances
- 1973; 1975; 1978; 1982; 1986; 1991; 1994; 1998; 2001; 2003; 2005; 2007; 2009; 2011; 2013; 2015; 2017; 2019; 2022; 2023; 2024

Vietnam competed at the 2024 World Aquatics Championships in Doha, Qatar from 2 to 18 February.

== Competitors ==
The following is the list of competitors in the Championships.

Sport	Men	Women	Total
Swimming	6	0	6
Total	6	0	6

== Swimming ==
Vietnam entered 6 swimmers.

Men

Athlete	Event	Heat		Semifinal		Final	
Athlete	Event	Time	Rank	Time	Rank	Time	Rank
Ngô Đình Chuyền	200 metre freestyle	1:53.64	46	Did not advance			
Nguyễn Huy Hoàng	400 metre freestyle	4:02.13	40	—		Did not advance	
Nguyễn Huy Hoàng	800 metre freestyle	8:05.17	29	—		Did not advance	
Nguyễn Huy Hoàng	1500 metre freestyle	15:22.86	22	—		Did not advance	
Nguyễn Quang Thuấn	400 metre individual medley	4:28.72	20	—		Did not advance	
Nguyễn Hoàng Khang	50 metre butterfly	24.20	43	Did not advance			
Phạm Thanh Bảo	100 metre breaststroke	1:02.94	40	Did not advance			
Phạm Thanh Bảo	200 metre breaststroke	2:18.58	25	Did not advance			
Trần Hưng Nguyên	200 metre backstroke	2:08.71	32	Did not advance			
Trần Hưng Nguyên	200 metre individual medley	2:04.75	27	Did not advance			
Trần Hưng Nguyên; Nguyễn Huy Hoàng; Ngô Đình Chuyền; Nguyễn Quang Thuấn	4 × 100 m freestyle relay	3:30.37	19	—		Did not advance	
Trần Hưng Nguyên; Nguyễn Huy Hoàng; Ngô Đình Chuyền; Nguyễn Quang Thuấn	4 × 200 m freestyle relay	7:32.22	15	—		Did not advance	
Tran Hung Nguyen; Pham Thanh Bao; Nguyen Hoang Khang; Ngo Dinh Chuyen	4 × 100 m medley relay	3:57.99	22	—		Did not advance	
