= Vietnam at the 2022 World Aquatics Championships =

- Flag of Vietnam
- FINA code: VIE
- National federation: Vietnam Aquatic Sports Association

in Budapest, Hungary
- Competitors: 9 in 1 sport
- Medals: Gold 0 Silver 0 Bronze 0 Total 0

World Aquatics Championships appearances
- 1973; 1975; 1978; 1982; 1986; 1991; 1994; 1998; 2001; 2003; 2005; 2007; 2009; 2011; 2013; 2015; 2017; 2019; 2022; 2023; 2024

Vietnam competed at the 2022 World Aquatics Championships in Budapest, Hungary from 17 June to 3 July.

== Swimming ==
Vietnam entered nine swimmers.

Men

| Athlete | Event | Heat | | Semifinal | | Final | |
| Athlete | Event | Time | Rank | Time | Rank | Time | Rank |
|---|---|---|---|---|---|---|---|
| Hồ Nguyễn Duy Khoa | 200 m butterfly | 2:01.05 | 32 | did not advance | | | |
| Hoàng Quý Phước | 100 m freestyle | 50.43 | =50 | did not advance | | | |
| Hoàng Quý Phước | 200 m freestyle | 1:52.47 | 44 | did not advance | | | |
| Nguyễn Hữu Kim Sơn | 800 m freestyle | 8:24.02 | 25 | — | | did not advance | |
| Nguyễn Huy Hoàng | 400 m freestyle | 3:54.05 | 26 | — | | did not advance | |
| Nguyễn Huy Hoàng | 1500 m freestyle | 15:15.06 | 16 | — | | did not advance | |
| Phạm Thanh Bảo | 50 m breaststroke | 28.90 | 37 | did not advance | | | |
| Phạm Thanh Bảo | 100 m breaststroke | 1:03.19 | 39 | did not advance | | | |
| Phạm Thanh Bảo | 200 m breaststroke | 2:17.34 | 29 | did not advance | | | |
| Trần Hưng Nguyễn | 200 medley | 2:03.62 | 27 | — | | did not advance | |
| Hồ Nguyễn Duy Khoa; Hoàng Quý Phước; Nguyễn Hữu Kim Sơn; Trần Hưng Nguyễn | 4 × 100 m freestyle relay | 3:28.20 | 17 | — | | did not advance | |
| Hoàng Quý Phước; Nguyễn Hữu Kim Sơn; Nguyễn Huy Hoàng; Trần Hưng Nguyễn | 4 × 200 m freestyle relay | 7:29.74 | 13 | — | | did not advance | |
| Hồ Nguyễn Duy Khoa; Hoàng Quý Phước; Phạm Thanh Bảo; Trần Hưng Nguyễn | 4 × 100 m medley relay | 3:47.69 | 16 | — | | did not advance | |

Women

| Athlete | Event | Heat | | Semifinal | | Final | |
| Athlete | Event | Time | Rank | Time | Rank | Time | Rank |
|---|---|---|---|---|---|---|---|
| Lê Thị Mỹ Thảo | 100 m butterfly | 1:02.48 | 23 | did not advance | | | |
| Lê Thị Mỹ Thảo | 200 m butterfly | 2:18.65 | 23 | did not advance | | | |
| Võ Thị Mỹ Tiên | 400 m freestyle | 4:28.99 | 27 | — | | did not advance | |
| Võ Thị Mỹ Tiên | 800 m freestyle | 9:12.87 | 20 | — | | did not advance | |
| Võ Thị Mỹ Tiên | 1500 m freestyle | 17:14.54 | 22 | — | | did not advance | |

Mixed

| Athlete | Event | Heat | | Semifinal | | Final | |
| Athlete | Event | Time | Rank | Time | Rank | Time | Rank |
|---|---|---|---|---|---|---|---|
| Lê Thị Mỹ Thảo; Nguyễn Hữu Kim Sơn; Nguyễn Quang Thuấn; Võ Thị Mỹ Tiên | 4 × 100 m freestyle relay | 3:45.88 | 20 | — | | did not advance | |
| Lê Thị Mỹ Thảo; Nguyễn Quang Thuấn; Phạm Thanh Bảo; Võ Thị Mỹ Tiên | 4 × 100 m medley relay | 4:07.53 | 19 | — | | did not advance | |
