= Vietnam at the 2017 World Aquatics Championships =

- Flag of Vietnam
- FINA code: VIE
- National federation: Vietnam Aquatic Sports Association
- Website: vasa.vn

in Budapest, Hungary
- Competitors: 6 in 1 sport
- Medals: Gold 0 Silver 0 Bronze 0 Total 0

World Aquatics Championships appearances
- 1973; 1975; 1978; 1982; 1986; 1991; 1994; 1998; 2001; 2003; 2005; 2007; 2009; 2011; 2013; 2015; 2017; 2019; 2022; 2023; 2024

Vietnam competed at the 2017 World Aquatics Championships in Budapest, Hungary from 14 July to 30 July.

== Swimming ==
Vietnamese swimmers have achieved qualifying standards in the following events (up to a maximum of 2 swimmers in each event at the A-standard entry time, and 1 at the B-standard):

Men

Athlete	Event	Heat		Semifinal		Final	
Athlete	Event	Time	Rank	Time	Rank	Time	Rank
Hoàng Quý Phước	50 m freestyle	23.56	67	Did not advance			
Hoàng Quý Phước	100 m freestyle	49.67	37	Did not advance			
Hoàng Quý Phước	200 m freestyle	1:49.87	=40	Did not advance			
Hoàng Quý Phước	100 m butterfly	54.76	52	Did not advance			
Lê Nguyễn Paul	50 m backstroke	25.64	32	Did not advance			
Lê Nguyễn Paul	100 m backstroke	56.64	34	Did not advance			
Nguyễn Hữu Kim Sơn	1500 m freestyle	15:29.90 NR	30	—		Did not advance	
Nguyễn Hữu Kim Sơn	400 m individual medley	4:26.07	30	—		Did not advance	
Nguyễn Ngọc Huỳnh	200 m butterfly	2:03.57	39	Did not advance			

Women

Athlete	Event	Heat		Semifinal		Final	
Athlete	Event	Time	Rank	Time	Rank	Time	Rank
Nguyễn Thị Ánh Viên	400 m freestyle	DNS		—		Did not advance	
Nguyễn Thị Ánh Viên	200 m individual medley	2:13.36	18	Did not advance			
Nguyễn Thị Ánh Viên	400 m individual medley	4:40.39	10	—		Did not advance	
Nguyễn Thị Nhất Lam	100 m breaststroke	1:15.99	41	Did not advance			
Nguyễn Thị Nhất Lam	200 m breaststroke	2:45.25	30	Did not advance			
