= Sydney Pickrem =

Canadian swimmer (born 1997)

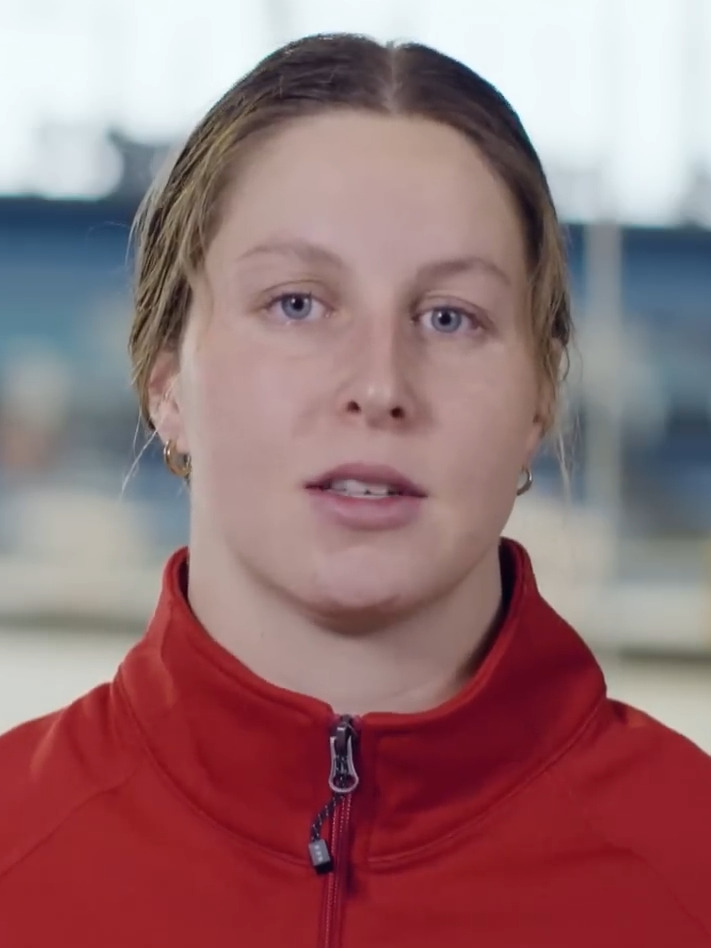
- Pickrem in 2021

Personal information
- Full name: Sydney Martinez Pickrem
- National team: Canada
- Born: Sydney Pickrem; May 21, 1997 (age 29) Dunedin, Florida, U.S.
- Home town: Halifax, Nova Scotia, Canada
- Height: 1.76 m (5 ft 9 in)
- Weight: 54 kg (119 lb)

Sport
- Sport: Swimming
- Strokes: Individual medley, breaststroke
- Club: HPC Toronto
- College team: Texas A&M University
- Coach: Steve Bultman (Texas A&M)
Medal record
Women's swimming
Representing Canada
Event	1st	2nd	3rd
Olympic Games	0	0	1
World Championships (LC)	0	1	6
World Championships (SC)	2	2	2
Pan Pacific Championships	0	1	0
World Junior Championships	0	0	1
Total	2	4	10
Olympic Games
Bronze medal – third place	2020 Tokyo	4×100 m medley
World Championships (LC)
Silver medal – second place	2024 Doha	200 m medley
Bronze medal – third place	2017 Budapest	400 m medley
Bronze medal – third place	2019 Gwangju	200 m breaststroke
Bronze medal – third place	2019 Gwangju	200 m medley
Bronze medal – third place	2019 Gwangju	4×100 m medley
Bronze medal – third place	2024 Doha	200 m breaststroke
Bronze medal – third place	2024 Doha	4×100 m medley
World Championships (SC)
Gold medal – first place	2021 Abu Dhabi	200 m medley
Gold medal – first place	2021 Abu Dhabi	4×200 m freestyle
Silver medal – second place	2021 Abu Dhabi	4×100 m medley
Silver medal – second place	2022 Melbourne	4×200 m freestyle
Bronze medal – third place	2022 Melbourne	4×100 m medley
Bronze medal – third place	2024 Budapest	4×100 m freestyle
Pan American Games
Gold medal – first place	2023 Santiago	200 m medley
Gold medal – first place	2023 Santiago	200 m breaststroke
Silver medal – second place	2015 Toronto	400 m medley
Bronze medal – third place	2015 Toronto	200 m medley
Pan Pacific Championships
Silver medal – second place	2018 Tokyo	200 m medley
World Junior Championships
Bronze medal – third place	2013 Dubai	200 m medley
Junior Pan Pacific Championships
Silver medal – second place	2012 Honolulu	4×100 m medley

Sydney Martinez Pickrem (née Pickrem; born May 21, 1997) is a Canadian competitive swimmer who competed for Texas A&M University in College Station. A three-time Olympian, she placed sixth in the 200m individual medley at the 2016 Summer Olympics and won a bronze medal at the 2020 Summer Olympics as part of the Canadian 4×100 metre medley relay team. At the 2024 Paris Olympics, she participated in the women’s 200-meter individual medley and the 200-meter breaststroke, but finished out of medal contention. Accomplished in international competition, she is a seven-time World Aquatics Championships medallist.

== Early life ==
=== Carwise Middle School ===
Sydney Pickrem attended Joseph L. Carwise Middle School in Palm Harbor, Florida. She competed on the Carwise Girls Track Team while she was there.

=== East Lake High School ===
Sydney Pickrem was born May 21, 1997 in Dunedin, Florida. She attended East Lake High School in Tarpon Springs where she swam for East Lake Coach Tim O'Keefe and would hold state championship individual titles in backstroke, breaststroke, and individual medley.

As a High School Freshman at East Lake, she captured a state championship in the 100 breaststroke with a time of 1:02.91, taking a strong lead throughout the event, and finishing only a second from the state record. She was named "Girls Swimmer of the Year" by the Tampa Bay Times. As a Sophomore at the 2012 Class 3A Florida State Championship meet, Pickrem won the 200 individual medley with a time of 2:01.40.

As an East Lake Junior, she was a conference champion in the 100 backstroke with a county record time of 56.25, and also held the county record time of 2:02.16 in the 200 individual medley. As an East Lake Senior in November, 2014 at the Class 4A Florida State Swimming and Diving Championships, Pickrem captured two more state titles with a first in the 200 Individual Medley with a time of 1:59.17, and another first in the 100 backstroke with a time of 54.72. With Pickrem's East Lake won the team state title that year.

She made her first senior national team in 2014, winning bronze medals in the 200m and 400m individual medley at the Canadian Swimming Trials to earn spots at the 2014 Commonwealth Games and 2014 Pan Pacific Swimming Championships.

Specializing in the breaststroke and individual medley, she was selected to the 2012 Junior Pan Pacific Swimming Championships. In 2013, she represented Canada at the Australian Youth Olympic Festival in January where she won four medals: gold in the 200m backstroke and 200m IM, and silver in the 400m IM and 200m breaststroke. At the 4th FINA World Junior Swimming Championships in Dubai, Pickrem won a bronze in the 200m IM.

=== Texas A&M ===
Pickrem attended Texas A&M University where she swam for Hall of Fame women's coach Steve Bultman. At Texas A&M, she was an All-American 11 times and as a more distinctive form of recognition was awarded the Texas A&M Athlete of the Year award in 2017 and 2018.

== Career ==
=== 2017 World Aquatic Championships ===
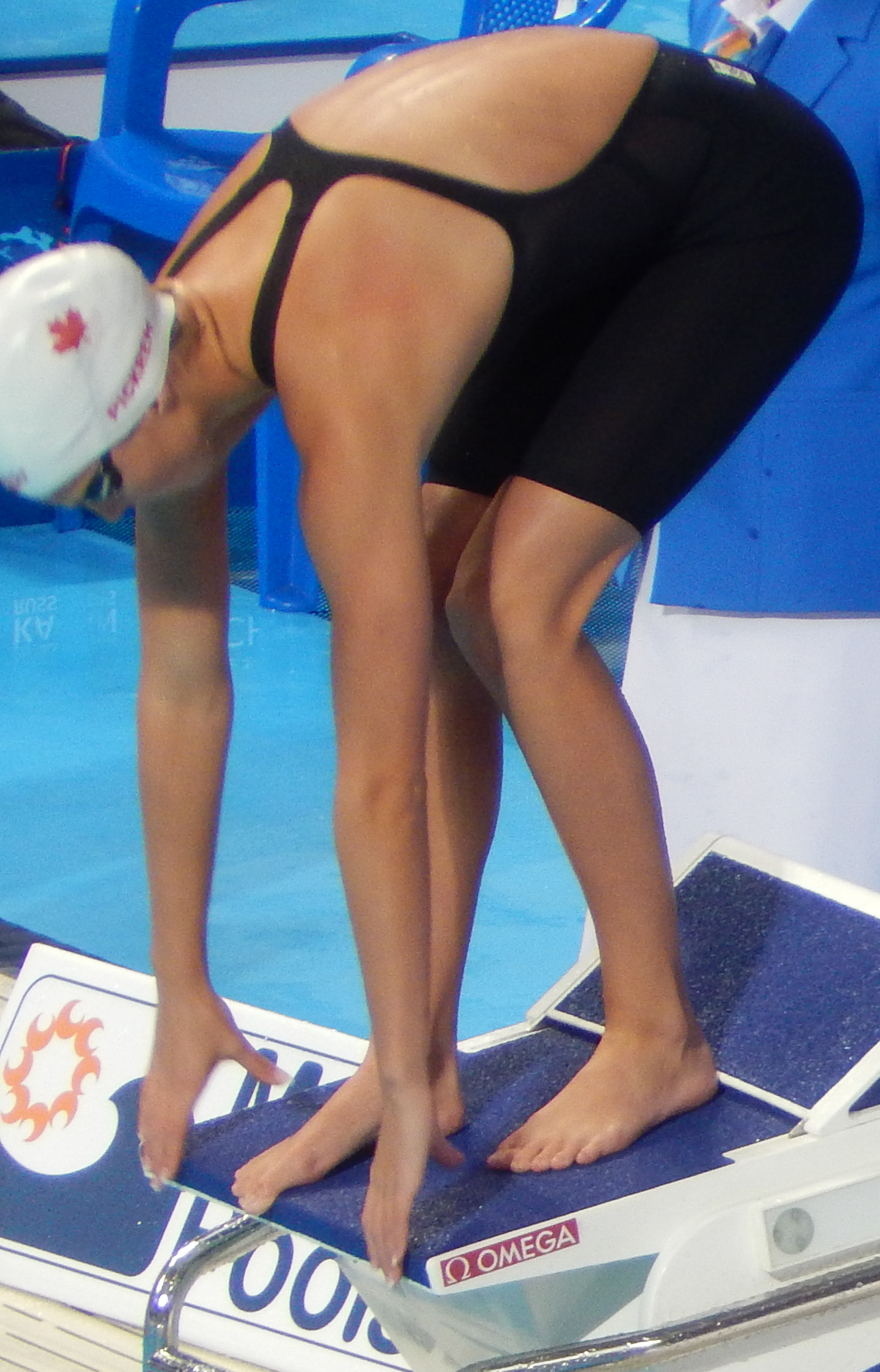
Pickrem in August 2015

Pickrem competed at the 2017 World Championships where she participated in both the 200m and 400m individual medleys. She qualified for the final with the third fastest time in the 200m, putting her in the running for a medal. In the final Pickrem met with disappointment when she suddenly pulled out of the pool after the 50m butterfly after apparently swallowing too much water. She bounced back and captured a bronze medal in the 400m individual medley, setting a personal best in the process. After the race an emotional Pickrem said "As much as I felt like I disappointed Canada in my 200m IM, to come back and be able to get on the podium, it's just a relief and really exciting. I'm proud to be Canadian and do that for Canada."

=== 2016 Olympics ===
In 2016, she was officially named to Canada's Olympic team for the 2016 Summer Olympics where she performed admirably, finishing sixth in the 200m individual medley as a 19 year old. In the 400m individual medley, she finished 12th in the preliminary heats and failed to advance to the finals.

=== 2019 World Aquatic Championships ===
The 2019 World Championships were one of Pickrem's most decorated events. She won her second bronze medal in the 200m individual medley. Pickrem won a second bronze medal while swimming the breaststroke leg of the women's medley relay together with Penny Oleksiak, Maggie Mac Neil, and Kylie Masse. She set a Canadian record in the 200m breaststroke on her way to winning her third bronze medal of the competition. Her three individual bronze medals meant that she was the most decorated Canadian female swimmer at the FINA World Championships, as some of Oleksiak's medals were won in relays.

=== 2020 Olympics ===
Named to Canada's 2020 Olympic team, Pickrem won a bronze medal as part of Canada's 4×100m medley relay team, again alongside Masse, Mac Neil and Oleksiak. In an interview post-race, Pickrem gained a viral social media moment when she accidentally cursed on live television while stating how nervous she was for her leg of the race.

A non-Covid related illness forced Pickrem out of starting her favoured individual events the 400m individual medley and 100m breaststroke, where she had just won medals in the FINA World Championships. She also swam the 200m medley at the 2020 Olympics and placed in sixth position.

=== 2021 FINA World Swimming Championships ===
Pickrem brought home more hardware at the 2021 FINA World Swimming Championships (25m). In the 200m individual medley she trailed Kate Douglass and Yu Yiting after the first 100m but used her stronger breaststroke to take the lead by the 150m mark to take the gold medal. After the win, Pickrem said that "I knew I had to have my best back half, that's my strength. The times don't really matter with how my prep has been this season, it's just getting up and racing." She would add another gold after swimming the semi-final for Canadian women's 4x200 metre freestyle relay team, which won gold in the final. Pickrem also swam the breaststroke leg of the 4x100 metre medley relay, finishing in second place for her third medal of the competition.

=== 2022 withdrawal from competition ===
Following the 2021 season, Pickrem was dogged by mental health struggles. After missing the podium at the 2022 World Aquatics Championships, she announced that she was withdrawing from the Canadian team for the 2022 Commonwealth Games in Birmingham, citing "personal reasons."

After appearing at the 2023 Canadian trials and qualifying for the 2023 World Aquatics Championships, Pickrem subsequently withdrew, saying that she was suffering from "crippling anxiety and depression." She would later state that she "felt like there was Sydney the person, Sydney the swimmer, Sydney the teammate, and Sydney the leader. Those were all separate entities to me. For a long time I didn't even care about Sydney the person."

=== 2023 Swimming World Cup ===
Pickrem returned to competition in the fall on the Swimming World Cup circuit, enjoying success. She said she was "happy to be here and trying to do the best I can every day."

=== 2023 Pan American Games ===
She was named to the Canadian team for the 2023 Pan American Games in Santiago, where she won gold medals in both the 200 m individual medley and the 200 m breaststroke, setting a Games record in the former. She explained afterward that the "biggest thing that me and my coach worked on, let's be the best me that I can be, and whatever swimmer that is, that's what's meant to be."

=== 2024 World Aquatics Championships ===
While many of Canada's top swimmers opted to skip the 2024 World Aquatics Championships in Doha, Pickrem was named to the team. In her first contest of the event, she won a silver medal in the 200 metre individual medley, lowering her personal best to 2:08.56 seconds and finishing 0.45 seconds ahead of Chinese bronze medalist Yu Yiting. She went on to win a bronze medal in the 200 m breaststroke. On the final day of the championships, Pickrem swam the breaststroke leg for Canada in the heats of the 4×100 m medley relay. She was replaced by Sophie Angus in the final, but shared in the team's bronze medal win, her seventh World Aquatics medal.

=== 2024 Olympics ===
Pickrem again represented Canada at the 2024 Paris Olympics, capturing a sixth place finish in the women’s 200-meter individual medley and finishing ninth in the 200-meter breaststroke.

=== Coaching ===
In September 2024, beginning her first season, Pickrem started as an Assistant Coach for West Virginia University Swimming and Diving assisting new Head Coach Brent MacDonald.

== Personal life ==
Pickrem holds dual nationality from being born in the United States to Canadian parents from Halifax, Nova Scotia. She comes from a sporting background as her father Darren Pickrem, played in the Quebec Major Junior Hockey League. With roots in Nova Scotia, Pickrem also lists Clearwater, Florida as her hometown and Prince Edward Island as her favourite place to visit.

== Personal bests ==
=== Long course (50-meter pool) ===
Event	Time	Venue	Date	Notes
100 m freestyle	55.41	Toronto, Canada	May 26, 2021	
100 m breaststroke	1:07.20	Clovis, California, USA	June 7, 2019	
200 m breaststroke	2:22.63	Toronto, Canada	April 3, 2019	
200 m individual medley	2:08.56	Doha, Qatar	February 12, 2024	
400m individual medley	4:32.88	Budapest, Hungary	July 30, 2017	

=== Short course (25-meter pool) ===
Event	Time	Venue	Date	Notes
50m breaststroke	31.60	Eindhoven, Netherlands	December 3, 2021	
200m individual medley	2:04.00	Budapest, Hungary	November 21, 2020	NR
400m individual medley	4:23.68	Budapest, Hungary	November 15, 2020	former NR

== See also ==
- List of World Aquatics Championships medalists in swimming (women)
