= Miriam Sheehan =

Puerto Rican swimmer (born 2004)

Personal information
- Born: 20 September 2004 (age 21) Phoenix, Arizona, U.S.

Sport
- Country: Puerto Rico
- Sport: Swimming

Miriam Sheehan (born 20 September 2004) is a former Puerto Rican swimmer. She competed in the 2020 Summer Olympics, held July–August 2021 in Tokyo.
