= List of Puerto Rican records in swimming =

The Puerto Rican records in swimming are the fastest ever performances of swimmers from Puerto Rico, which are recognised and ratified by the Puerto Rican Swimming Federation: Federación Puertorriqueña de Natación (FPN).

All records were set in finals unless noted otherwise.

== Long Course (50 m) ==
=== Men ===
| Event | Time | | Name | Club | Date | Meet | Location | Ref |
|---|---|---|---|---|---|---|---|---|
| 50 m freestyle | 22.22 | | Erik Risolvato | Puerto Rico | 14 July 2015 | Pan American Games | Toronto, Canada | |
| 50 m freestyle | 22.13 | not ratified | Erik Risolvato | Columbus Aquatic Club | 22 June 2019 | Richard Quick Invitational | Auburn, United States | |
| 100 m freestyle | 49.61 | h | Ricardo Busquets | Puerto Rico | 22 July 1996 | Olympic Games | Atlanta, United States | |
| 200 m freestyle | 1:48.81 | h | Douglas Clark Lennox II | Puerto Rico | 27 July 2009 | World Championships | Rome, Italy | |
| 400 m freestyle | 3:53.61 | h | Christian Bayo | Puerto Rico | 2 August 2015 | World Championships | Kazan, Russia | |
| 800 m freestyle | 8:06.34 | | Christian Bayo | Puerto Rico | 25 April 2019 | Puerto Rico International Open | San Juan, Puerto Rico | |
| 1500 m freestyle | 15:33.61 | | Jorge Herrera | Puerto Rico | 18 August 1991 | Pan American Games | Havana, Cuba | |
| 50 m backstroke | 25.50 | | Yeziel Morales | Puerto Rico | 27 April 2023 | Puerto Rico International Open | San Juan, Puerto Rico | |
| 100 m backstroke | 54.89 | | Yeziel Morales | Azura Florida Aquatic Club | 19 June 2021 | International Meet Ravne | Ravne na Koroškem, Slovenia | |
| 200 m backstroke | 1:57.97 | h | Yeziel Morales | Mission Viejo Nadadores | 21 June 2024 | Mel Zajac Jr. International Meet | Vancouver, Canada | |
| 50 m breaststroke | 28.08 | h | Xavier Ruiz | Puerto Rico | 5 April 2024 | Dominican Republic International Open | Santo Domingo, Dominican Republic | |
| 100 m breaststroke | 1:00.80 | h | Xavier Ruiz | Puerto Rico | 10 August 2025 | Junior Pan American Games | Asunción, Paraguay | |
| 200 m breaststroke | 2:12.00 | | Xavier Ruiz | Puerto Rico | 31 July 2026 | CAC Games | Santo Domingo, Dominican Republic | |
| 50m butterfly | 23.75 | | Erik Risolvato | - | 1 April 2015 | - | Canada | |
| 50m butterfly | 23.72 | tt, not ratified | Erik Risolvato | Unattached | 18 May 2019 | Atlanta Classic | Atlanta, United States | |
| 100m butterfly | 52.39 | h | Douglas Clark Lennox II | Puerto Rico | 31 July 2009 | World Championships | Rome, Italy | |
| 200m butterfly | 1:57.94 | sf | Andrew Livingston | Puerto Rico | 16 July 2001 | World Championships | Fukuoka, Japan | |
| 200m individual medley | 2:00.61 | h | Jarod Arroyo | Puerto Rico | 24 June 2021 | CCCAN Championships | San Juan, Puerto Rico | |
| 400m individual medley | 4:16.63 | | Jarod Arroyo | Puerto Rico | 22 May 2021 | Puerto Rican International Open | Salinas, Puerto Rico | |
| 4 × 50 m freestyle relay | 1:36.23 | | Todd Torres; Santaella; Jorge Herrera; Manuel Guzmán | Puerto Rico | 6 January 1991 | - | Perth, Australia | |
| 4 × 100 m freestyle relay | 3:25.47 | | | Puerto Rico | March 1995 | Pan American Games | Mar del Plata, Argentina | |
| 4 × 200 m freestyle relay | 7:27.29 | | Christian Bayo (1:51.22); Jarod Arroyo (1:51.67); Andres Solivan (1:52.58); Yeziel Morales (1:51.82) | Puerto Rico | 20 July 2018 | CAC Games | Barranquilla, Colombia | |
| 4 × 50 m medley relay | 1:49.71 | | Yeziel Morales (28.01); David Alvarez; Andres Solivan; William Martinez | Puerto Rico | July 2013 | SZS Summer Sectionals | Orlando, United States | |
| 4 × 100 m medley relay | 3:38.65 | | Yeziel Morales (55.54); Xavier Ruiz; Andres Brooks; Alexander Santiago (49.73) | Puerto Rico | 1 August 2026 | CAC Games | Santo Domingo, Dominican Republic | |

Legend: # – Record awaiting ratification by FPN; WR – World record; AM – Americas record; e – equalled existing record;
Records not set in finals: h – heat; sf – semifinal; r – relay 1st leg; rh – relay heat 1st leg; b – B final; † – en route to final mark; so – swim-off; tt – time trial

=== Women ===
| Event | Time | | Name | Club | Date | Meet | Location | Ref |
|---|---|---|---|---|---|---|---|---|
| 50m freestyle | 24.94 | h | Vanessa García | Puerto Rico | 12 August 2016 | Olympic Games | Rio de Janeiro, Brazil | |
| 100m freestyle | 55.00 | | Vanessa García | Puerto Rico | 19 July 2010 | Central American and Caribbean Games | Mayagüez, Puerto Rico | |
| 200m freestyle | 2:04.37 | b | Kristen Romano | Puerto Rico | 21 July 2018 | CAC Games | Barranquilla, Colombia | |
| 400m freestyle | 4:17.15 | | Kristen Romano | Puerto Rico | 20 July 2018 | CAC Games | Barranquilla, Colombia | |
| 800m freestyle | 8:56.90 | | Lucianna Gutierrez | Puerto Rico | 28 July 2026 | CAC Games | Santo Domingo, Dominican Republic | |
| 1500m freestyle | 17:04.29 | | Lucianna Gutierrez | Puerto Rico | 30 July 2026 | CAC Games | Santo Domingo, Dominican Republic | |
| 50m backstroke | 27.62 | | Miriam Sheehan | - | 1 May 2021 | - | San Juan, Puerto Rico | |
| 100m backstroke | 1:01.88 | | Kristen Romano | Tennessee Aquatics | 21 June 2026 | Tennessee Aquatics June Invitational | Santo Domingo, Dominican Republic | |
| 200m backstroke | 2:11.68 | | Kristen Romano | Puerto Rico | 1 August 2026 | CAC Games | Santo Domingo, Dominican Republic | |
| 50m breaststroke | 32.56 | † | Kristen Romano | Puerto Rico | 12 April 2026 | Puerto Rico International Open | Salinas, Puerto Rico | |
| 100m breaststroke | 1:10.93 | | Kristen Romano | Puerto Rico | 12 April 2026 | Puerto Rico International Open | Salinas, Puerto Rico | |
| 200m breaststroke | 2:30.44 | | Kristen Romano | Tennessee Aquatics | 19 June 2026 | Tennessee Aquatics June Invitational | Santo Domingo, Dominican Republic | |
| 50m butterfly | 26.67 | | Miriam Sheehan | Puerto Rico | 23 August 2019 | World Junior Championships | Budapest, Hungary | |
| 100m butterfly | 58.79 | | Kristen Romano | Puerto Rico | 30 July 2026 | CAC Games | Santo Domingo, Dominican Republic | |
| 200m butterfly | 2:14.21 | | Tereysa Lehnertz | - | 24 April 2016 | Mayagüez International Open | Mayagüez, Puerto Rico | |
| 200m individual medley | 2:12.16 | | Kristen Romano | Puerto Rico | 28 July 2026 | CAC Games | Santo Domingo, Dominican Republic | |
| 400m individual medley | 4:44.87 | | Kristen Romano | Puerto Rico | 29 July 2026 | CAC Games | Santo Domingo, Dominican Republic | |
| 4 × 50 m freestyle relay | 1:52.07 | | Ariana Carrasquillo (27.98); Yamilka Rios; Valerie Mejias; Maria Burgos | Puerto Rico | July 2013 | SZS Summer Sectionals | Orlando, United States | |
| 4 × 100 m freestyle relay | 3:50.53 | | Coral López (58.72); Alana Berrocal (58.49); Debra Rodríguez (58.51); Vanessa García (54.81) | Puerto Rico | 22 July 2010 | Central American and Caribbean Games | Mayagüez, Puerto Rico | |
| 4 × 200 m freestyle relay | 8:37.36 | | Gretchen Gotay; Vanessa Martinez; Militza Rios; Vanessa García | Puerto Rico | 17 July 2006 | Central American and Caribbean Games | Cartagena, Colombia | |
| 4 × 50 m medley relay | 2:04.25 | | Erika Carlo (33.10); Patricia Casellas; Marines Rosario; Falan Dorsey | Puerto Rico | July 2013 | SZS Summer Sectionals | Orlando, United States | |
| 4 × 100 m medley relay | 4:16.57 | | Alana Berrocal (1:04.95); Patricia Casellas; Barbara Caraballo; Vanessa García | Puerto Rico | 20 July 2010 | Central American and Caribbean Games | Mayagüez, Puerto Rico | |

Legend: # – Record awaiting ratification by FPN; WR – World record; AM – Americas record; e – equalled existing record;
Records not set in finals: h – heat; sf – semifinal; r – relay 1st leg; rh – relay heat 1st leg; b – B final; † – en route to final mark; so – swim-off; tt – time trial

=== Mixed relay ===
| Event | Time | | Name | Club | Date | Meet | Location | Ref |
|---|---|---|---|---|---|---|---|---|
| 4 × 50 m freestyle relay | 1:37.89 | | Louis Ortiz (22.73); Liznel Ortiz (26.30); Jan Collazo (22.90); Keyla Brown (25.96) | Puerto Rico | 23 June 2021 | CCCAN | San Juan, Puerto Rico | |
| 4 × 100 m freestyle relay | 3:36.28 | not ratified | Armando Flores (50.30); Louis Ortiz (51.42); Celismar Guzman (57.67); Vanessa García (56.89) | Puerto Rico | 23 July 2018 | CAC Games | Barranquilla, Colombia | |
| 4 × 50 m medley relay | | | | | | | | |
| 4 × 100 m medley relay | 3:52.23 | | Yeziel Morales (55.22); Xavier Ruiz (1:00.16); Kristen Romano (58.86); Ella Busquets (57.99) | Puerto Rico | 30 July 2026 | CAC Games | Santo Domingo, Dominican Republic | |

Legend: # – Record awaiting ratification by FPN; WR – World record; AM – Americas record; e – equalled existing record;
Records not set in finals: h – heat; so – swim-off

== Short Course (25 m) ==
=== Men ===
| Event | Time | | Name | Club | Date | Meet | Location | Ref |
|---|---|---|---|---|---|---|---|---|
| 50m freestyle | 21.86 | | Ricardo Busquets | Puerto Rico | 20 March 2000 | - | Athens, Greece | |
| 100m freestyle | 48.87 | | Ricardo Busquets | Puerto Rico | April 1997 | - | Hongkong, Hong Kong | |
| 200m freestyle | 1:49.58 | | Caleb Romero | Los Marlins De Manati | 8 December 2023 | Puerto Rican Championships | San Juan, Puerto Rico | |
| 200m freestyle | 1:47.63 | '#' | Caleb Romero | Los Marlins De Manati | 11 October 2024 | Puerto Rico International Open | San Juan, Puerto Rico | |
| 400m freestyle | 3:50.53 | h | Christian Bayo | Puerto Rico | 6 December 2016 | World Championships | Windsor, Canada | |
| 400m freestyle | 3:49.17 | '#' | Caleb Romero | Los Marlins De Manati | 10 October 2024 | Puerto Rico International Open | San Juan, Puerto Rico | |
| 800m freestyle | 7:59.15 | | Christian Bayo | Equipo Natacion Encantada | 10 December 2022 | Puerto Rican Championships | San Juan, Puerto Rico | |
| 1500m freestyle | 15:21.63 | | Yeziel Morales | BAY | 4 December 2015 | Puerto Rican Championships | San Juan, Puerto Rico | |
| 50m backstroke | 24.06 | h | Yeziel Morales | Azura Florida Aquatics | 28 October 2021 | Puerto Rico International Open | San Juan, Puerto Rico | |
| 100m backstroke | 51.81 | | Yeziel Morales | Azura Florida Aquatics | 31 October 2021 | Puerto Rico International Open | San Juan, Puerto Rico | |
| 200m backstroke | 1:52.16 | | Yeziel Morales | Azura Florida Aquatics | 30 October 2021 | Puerto Rico International Open | San Juan, Puerto Rico | |
| 200m backstroke | 1:51.56 | '#' | Yeziel Morales | Puerto Rico | 23 October 2025 | World Cup | Toronto, Canada | |
| 50m breaststroke | 27.86 | | Xavier Ruiz | San Juan Cariba | 5 October 2023 | - | San Juan, Puerto Rico | |
| 50m breaststroke | 27.61 | '#' | Diego Resto | Guaynabo City Mets Swim Team | 8 October 2024 | Puerto Rico International Open | San Juan, Puerto Rico | |
| 100m breaststroke | 1:00.24 | | Xavier Ruiz | San Juan Cariba | 27 August 2023 | - | San Juan, Puerto Rico | |
| 100m breaststroke | 1:00.02 | '#' | Diego Resto | Guaynabo City Mets Swim Team | 12 October 2024 | Puerto Rico International Open | San Juan, Puerto Rico | |
| 200m breaststroke | 2:09.52 | | Xavier Ruiz | San Juan Cariba | 26 August 2023 | Zone 1-2 Championships | San Juan, Puerto Rico | |
| 200m breaststroke | 2:06.62 | h, # | Xavier Ruiz | Puerto Rico | 12 October 2025 | World Cup | Carmel, United States | |
| 50m butterfly | 23.33 | | Alex Hernández | San Juan Cariba | 20 October 2022 | Puerto Rico International Open | San Juan, Puerto Rico | |
| 50m butterfly | 23.09 | h, # | Alex Santiago | Puerto Rico | 19 October 2025 | World Cup | Westmont, United States | |
| 100m butterfly | 53.96 | | Louis Ortiz | Guaynabo City Mets | 3 December 2021 | - | San Juan, Puerto Rico | |
| 100m butterfly | 52.69 | h, # | Alex Santiago | Puerto Rico | 17 October 2025 | World Cup | Westmont, United States | |
| 200m butterfly | 1:55.71 | h | Yeziel Morales | Puerto Rico | 4 November 2022 | World Cup | Indianapolis, United States | |
| 200m butterfly | 1:55.40 | h, # | Yeziel Morales | Puerto Rico | 12 December 2024 | World Championships | Budapest, Hungary | |
| 100m individual medley | 53.86 | | Yeziel Morales | Azura Florida Aquatics | 29 October 2021 | Puerto Rico International Open | San Juan, Puerto Rico | |
| 200m individual medley | 1:58.86 | h | Miguel Cancel | Puerto Rico | 16 December 2021 | World Championships | Abu Dhabi, United Arab Emirates | |
| 200m individual medley | 1:57.87 | h, # | Xavier Ruiz | Puerto Rico | 11 October 2025 | World Cup | Carmel, United States | |
| 400m individual medley | 4:10.40 | h | Jarod Arroyo | Puerto Rico | 15 December 2018 | World Championships | Hangzhou, China | |
| 4 × 50 m freestyle relay | 1:34.67 | | Robles; Cáceres; Pedraza; Louis Ortiz | University of Puerto Rico at Mayagüez | 5 December 2021 | - | San Juan, Puerto Rico | |
| 4 × 100 m freestyle relay | 3:27.42 | | Pedraza; Robles; Nater; Louis Ortiz | University of Puerto Rico at Mayagüez | 4 December 2021 | - | San Juan, Puerto Rico | |
| 4 × 200 m freestyle relay | 7:56.84 | | Padrón; Mercado; Acosta; Nater | University of Puerto Rico at Mayagüez | 3 December 2021 | - | San Juan, Puerto Rico | |
| 4 × 50 m medley relay | 1:48.24 | | J. Velázquez (29.79); C. Herrera (27.86); C. Herrera (26.98); J. Roso (23.61) | ADI | 11 December 2021 | - | San Juan, Puerto Rico | |
| 4 × 100 m medley relay | 4:05.47 | | A. Soto (1:01.58); R. Hernández (1:10.53); A. Useche (58.76); A. Cintrón (54.60) | Guaynabo City Mets | 12 December 2021 | - | San Juan, Puerto Rico | |

Legend: # – Record awaiting ratification by FPN; WR – World record; AM – Americas record; e – equalled existing record;
Records not set in finals: h – heat; sf – semifinal; r – relay 1st leg; rh – relay heat 1st leg; b – B final; † – en route to final mark; so – swim-off; tt – time trial

=== Women ===
| Event | Time | | Name | Club | Date | Meet | Location | Ref |
|---|---|---|---|---|---|---|---|---|
| 50m freestyle | 25.30 | | Vanessa García | NNDVB | 6 December 2013 | - | San Juan, Puerto Rico | |
| 100m freestyle | 55.57 | | Vanessa García | NNDVB | 6 December 2013 | - | San Juan, Puerto Rico | |
| 200m freestyle | 2:04.25 | | Marissa Lugo | Humacao | 22 October 2022 | Puerto Rico International Open | San Juan, Puerto Rico | |
| 400m freestyle | 4:20.64 | | Michelle Diago | NNDVB | 19 December 1998 | - | Salinas, Puerto Rico | |
| 800m freestyle | 8:48.83 | | Michelle Diago | NNDVB | 18 December 1998 | - | Salinas, Puerto Rico | |
| 1500m freestyle | 17:16.05 | | Emma Guglielmello | Puerto Rico | 31 October 2021 | Puerto Rico International Open | San Juan, Puerto Rico | |
| 50m backstroke | 26.96 | | Miriam Sheehan | San Juan Cariba | 19 September 2021 | Zone 1 & 3 Second Competition | San Juan, Puerto Rico | |
| 100m backstroke | 1:00.10 | | Miriam Sheehan | San Juan Cariba | 11 September 2021 | Zone 1 & 2 First Competition | San Juan, Puerto Rico | |
| 100m backstroke | 59.62 | '#' | Kristen Romano | Puerto Rico | 12 October 2024 | Puerto Rico International Open | San Juan, Puerto Rico | |
| 200m backstroke | 2:17.13 | | Liznel Ortiz | Club Acuatico de Mayagüez | 13 October 2020 | - | San Juan, Puerto Rico | |
| 200m backstroke | 2:06.58 | '#' | Kristen Romano | Tennessee Aquatics | 15 October 2026 | UVA Pro Elite SCM Worlds Prep Meet | Charlottesville, United States | |
| 50m breaststroke | 32.39 | h | Marissa Marie Lugo | Puerto Rico | 16 December 2021 | World Championships | Abu Dhabi, United Arab Emirates | |
| 100m breaststroke | 1:11.99 | | Patricia Casellas | CCC | 5 December 2010 | - | San Juan, Puerto Rico | |
| 200m breaststroke | 2:36.70 | | Maria Burgos | NPL | 4 December 2015 | Puerto Rican Championships | San Juan, Puerto Rico | |
| 50m butterfly | 27.23 | | Miriam Sheehan | San Juan Cariba | 11 September 2021 | Zone 1 & 2 First Competition | San Juan, Puerto Rico | |
| 50m butterfly | 26.94 | not ratified | Miriam Sheehan | San Juan Cariba | 16 November 2019 | - | San Juan, Puerto Rico | |
| 100m butterfly | 59.74 | | Miriam Sheehan | San Juan Cariba | 6 December 2019 | - | San Juan, Puerto Rico | |
| 100m butterfly | 58.93 | h, '#' | Kristen Romano | Puerto Rico | 13 December 2024 | World Championships | Budapest, Hungary | |
| 200m butterfly | 2:17.66 | | Sonia I. Alvarez | AOGR | 8 November 1997 | - | | |
| 100m individual medley | 1:01.76 | h | Kristen Romano | Puerto Rico | 15 December 2022 | World Championships | Melbourne, Australia | |
| 100m individual medley | 1:00.02 | '#' | Kristen Romano | Tennessee Aquatics | 15 October 2026 | UVA Pro Elite SCM Worlds Prep Meet | Charlottesville, United States | |
| 200m individual medley | 2:09.72 | h | Kristen Romano | Puerto Rico | 20 December 2021 | World Championships | Abu Dhabi, United Arab Emirates | |
| 200m individual medley | 2:08.02 | '#' | Kristen Romano | Tennessee Aquatics | 15 October 2026 | UVA Pro Elite SCM Worlds Prep Meet | Charlottesville, United States | |
| 400m individual medley | 4:40.94 | | Portia del Rio Brown | Guaynabo City Mets | 22 October 2022 | Puerto Rico International Open | San Juan, Puerto Rico | |
| 400m individual medley | 4:33.56 | h, # | Kristen Romano | Puerto Rico | 14 December 2024 | World Championships | Budapest, Hungary | |
| 4 × 50 m freestyle relay | 1:52.49 | | S. Mójica; S. Mójica; V. Martinez; Sonia I. Alvarez | Puerto Rico | 14 September 2002 | - | Trujillo Alto, Puerto Rico | |
| 4 × 100 m freestyle relay | 3:58.07 | | Cruz; Alyssa Viner; Lugo; Figueroa | Universidad del Sagrado Corazón | 4 December 2021 | - | San Juan, Puerto Rico | |
| 4 × 200 m freestyle relay | 9:08.12 | | P. Nuñez (2:19.71); A. Ortiz (2:18.40); S. Barreto (2:17.58); L. Pagán (2:12.43) | Caguas | 10 December 2021 | - | San Juan, Puerto Rico | |
| 4 × 50 m medley relay | 2:07.07 | | Ruíz; Vallés; León; González | University of Puerto Rico at Mayagüez | 4 December 2021 | - | San Juan, Puerto Rico | |
| 4 × 100 m medley relay | 4:40.39 | | A. Quiles Santos (1:09.34); C. Renta (1:19.93); A. Batista (1:03.03); I. Pérez (1:03.30) | Guaynabo City Mets | 12 December 2021 | - | San Juan, Puerto Rico | |

Legend: # – Record awaiting ratification by FPN; WR – World record; AM – Americas record; e – equalled existing record;
Records not set in finals: h – heat; sf – semifinal; r – relay 1st leg; rh – relay heat 1st leg; b – B final; † – en route to final mark; so – swim-off; tt – time trial

=== Mixed relay ===
| Event | Time | | Name | Club | Date | Meet | Location | Ref |
|---|---|---|---|---|---|---|---|---|
| 4 × 50 m freestyle relay | | | | | | | | |
| 4 × 100 m freestyle relay | 4:06.62 | | J. Rodríguez; J. Zayas; I. Izquierdo; P. Brown | Guaynabo City Mets | 15 November 2022 | - | Bayamón, Puerto Rico | |
| 4 × 50 m medley relay | 1:58.08 | | A. Sánchez; Xavier Ruiz; G. Castro; Ariadna Del Moral | San Juan Cariba | 26 August 2023 | - | San Juan, Puerto Rico | |
| 4 × 100 m medley relay | 4:14.92 | not ratified | D. Nater; M. Hernández; Alex Hernández; C. Castillo | San Juan Cariba | 10 December 2021 | - | San Juan, Puerto Rico | |

Legend: # – Record awaiting ratification by FPN; WR – World record; AM – Americas record; e – equalled existing record;
Records not set in finals: h – heat; so – swim-off
