= Yu Yiting =

Chinese swimmer (born 2005)

Personal information
- Native name: 余依婷
- Nationality: Chinese
- Born: 5 September 2005 (age 21) Changshan, Quzhou, Zhejiang, China
- Height: 173 cm (5 ft 8 in)

Sport
- Sport: Swimming
- Strokes: Medley
- Club: Zhejiang Swimming Team
Medal record
Women's swimming
Representing China
Event	1st	2nd	3rd
Olympic Games	0	0	2
World Championships (LC)	1	1	4
World Championships (SC)	0	1	1
Asian Games	8	3	0
Total	9	5	7
Olympic Games
Bronze medal – third place	2024 Paris	4×100 m freestyle
Bronze medal – third place	2024 Paris	4×100 m medley
World Championships (LC)
Gold medal – first place	2024 Doha	4×100 m mixed freestyle
Silver medal – second place	2025 Singapore	4×100 m mixed medley
Bronze medal – third place	2023 Fukuoka	200 m medley
Bronze medal – third place	2024 Doha	200 m medley
Bronze medal – third place	2025 Singapore	4×200 m freestyle
Bronze medal – third place	2025 Singapore	4×100 m medley
World Championships (SC)
Silver medal – second place	2021 Abu Dhabi	200 m medley
Bronze medal – third place	2021 Abu Dhabi	4×100 m medley
Pan Pacific Championships
Gold medal – first place	2026 Irvine	200 m medley
Bronze medal – third place	2026 Irvine	4×100 m medley
Asian Games
Gold medal – first place	2022 Hangzhou	200 m medley
Gold medal – first place	2022 Hangzhou	400 m medley
Gold medal – first place	2022 Hangzhou	4×100 m freestyle
Gold medal – first place	2026 Aichi–Nagoya	100 m butterfly
Gold medal – first place	2026 Aichi–Nagoya	4×100 m freestyle
Gold medal – first place	2026 Aichi–Nagoya	4×100 m medley
Gold medal – first place	2026 Aichi–Nagoya	4×100 m mixed medley
Gold medal – first place	2026 Aichi–Nagoya	4×200 m freestyle
Silver medal – second place	2022 Hangzhou	50 m butterfly
Silver medal – second place	2026 Aichi–Nagoya	100 m freestyle
Silver medal – second place	2026 Aichi–Nagoya	200 m medley

Yu Yiting (Chinese: 余依婷; pinyin: Yú Yītíng; born 5 September 2005) is a Chinese swimmer. She competed in the women's 200 metre individual medley at the 2019 World Aquatics Championships. Yu competed in the 200 meter individual medley and 400 meter individual medley at the 2020 Olympic Games.
