= Jarod Arroyo =

Puerto Rican swimmer (born 2001)

Personal information
- National team: Puerto Rico
- Born: 2 January 2001 (age 25)

Sport
- Sport: Swimming
- College team: Arizona State University
- Coach: Bob Bowman, Fernando Canales
Medal record
Representing Puerto Rico
Central American and Caribbean Games
Gold medal – first place	2018 Barranquilla	200 m medley
Silver medal – second place	2018 Barranquilla	400 m medley
Bronze medal – third place	2018 Barranquilla	4×200 m freestyle

Jarod Alexander Arroyo (born 2 January 2001) is a Puerto Rican swimmer. He represented Puerto Rico at the 2019 World Aquatics Championships in Gwangju, South Korea.

In 2018, he won the gold medal in the men's 200 metre individual medley event at the 2018 Central American and Caribbean Games held in Barranquilla, Colombia.

== Major results ==
=== Individual ===
==== Long course ====
Year	Competition	Venue	Position	Event	Notes
Representing Puerto Rico
2018	Central American and Caribbean Games	Barranquilla, Colombia	1st	200 m individual medley	2:02.37 NR
2018	Central American and Caribbean Games	Barranquilla, Colombia	2nd	400 m individual medley	4:21.10 NR
2019	Pan American Games	Lima, Peru	10th (WD)	200 m individual medley	2:04.30
2019	Pan American Games	Lima, Peru	5th (h)	400 m individual medley	4:22.87
2019	Pan American Games	Lima, Peru	14th (h)	200 m freestyle	1:52.97
2019	Pan American Games	Lima, Peru	10th (h)	200 m butterfly	2:01.27
2023	World Championships	Fukuoka, Japan	40th (h)	200 m individual medley	2:06.67
2023	World Championships	Fukuoka, Japan	25th (h)	400 m individual medley	4:27.11
2023	Pan American Games	Santiago, Chile	—	200 m individual medley	DNS
2023	Pan American Games	Santiago, Chile	10th (h)	400 m individual medley	4:28.42

=== Relay ===
==== Long course ====
Year	Competition	Venue	Team	Position	Event	Notes
Representing Puerto Rico
2018	Central American and Caribbean Games	Barranquilla, Colombia	Bayo / Arroyo / Solivan /Morales	3rd	4 × 200 m freestyle relay	7:27.29
2019	Pan American Games	Lima, Peru	Morales / Bayo / Cancel / Arroyo /	5th	4 × 200 m freestyle relay	7:36.13
