= Luís Flores =

Puerto Rican swimmer (born 1994)

Personal information
- Nationality: Puerto Rican
- Born: 9 March 1994 (age 32)

Sport
- Sport: Swimming

Luís Flores (born 9 March 1994) is a Puerto Rican swimmer. He competed in the men's 100 metre freestyle event at the 2017 World Aquatics Championships.
