= Kristen Romano =

Puerto Rican swimmer (born 1999)

Personal information
- Full name: Kristen Elena Romano Anglada
- Nationality: Puerto Rico
- Born: 24 September 1999 (age 26) Lancaster, New York, U.S.
- Height: 5 ft 9 in (175 cm)

Sport
- Sport: Swimming
- Strokes: freestyle, backstroke, medley
- College team: Ohio State Buckeyes
Medal record
Central American and Caribbean Games
Gold medal – first place	2023 San Salvador	200 m backstroke
Gold medal – first place	2023 San Salvador	400 m ind. medley
Gold medal – first place	2023 San Salvador	200 m ind. medley
Bronze medal – third place	2023 San Salvador	100 m backstroke
Gold medal – first place	2018 Barranquilla	200 m backstroke
Gold medal – first place	2018 Barranquilla	400 m ind. medley
Bronze medal – third place	2018 Barranquilla	200 m ind. medley

Kristen Elena Romano Anglada (born September 24, 1999) is an American born Puerto Rican swimmer. She competed at the 2019 World Aquatics Championships. At the 2018 Central American and Caribbean Games she won three medals (2 gold and 1 bronze).

== Major results ==
=== Individual ===
==== Long course ====
Year	Competition	Venue	Position	Event	Notes
Representing Puerto Rico
2018	Central American and Caribbean Games	Barranquilla, Colombia	10th (FB)	200 m freestyle	2:04.37
2018	Central American and Caribbean Games	Barranquilla, Colombia	4th	400 m freestyle	4:17.15
2018	Central American and Caribbean Games	Barranquilla, Colombia	1st	200 m backstroke	2:13.70
2018	Central American and Caribbean Games	Barranquilla, Colombia	3rd	200 m medley	2:17.01
2018	Central American and Caribbean Games	Barranquilla, Colombia	1st	400 m medley	4:46.31
2019	World Championships	Gwangju, South Korea	34th (h)	200 m medley	2:26.55
2021	Central American and Caribbean Championships	San Juan, Puerto Rico	1st	200 m backstroke	2:13.75
2021	Central American and Caribbean Championships	San Juan, Puerto Rico	1st	200 m medley	2:12.86
2022	World Championships	Budapest, Hungary	–	200 m backstroke	DSQ
2022	World Championships	Budapest, Hungary	29th (h)	200 m medley	2:18.89
2022	World Championships	Budapest, Hungary	16th (h)	400 m medley	4:56.39
2023	Central American and Caribbean Games	Santa Tecla, El Salvador	3rd	100 m backstroke	1:02.68
2023	Central American and Caribbean Games	Santa Tecla, El Salvador	1st	200 m backstroke	2:12.56
2023	Central American and Caribbean Games	Santa Tecla, El Salvador	1st	200 m medley	2:13:74 GR
2023	Central American and Caribbean Games	Santa Tecla, El Salvador	1st	400 m medley	4:45.47 GR
2023	World Championships	Fukuoka, Japan	20th (h)	200 m medley	2:13.94
2024	Summer Olympics	Paris, France	21st (h)	200 m medley	2:13.32

=== Relay ===
==== Long course ====
Year	Competition	Venue	Team	Position	Event	Notes
Representing Puerto Rico
2018	Central American and Caribbean Games	Barranquilla, Colombia	Guzman / Casellas / Romano / Rosado	4th	4 × 100 m medley	4:18.54

== Personal bests ==
Event	Result	SP	Competition	Venue	Date
Long course
200 m Freestyle	2:03.01	774	US Open Championships	(United States) East Meadow	5 August 2017
400 m Freestyle	4:17.15 NR	777	Central American and Caribbean Games	(Colombia) Barranquilla	20 July 2018
100 m Backstroke	1:02.99	780	US Junior National Championships	(United States) East Meadow	11 August 2017
200 m Backstroke	2:13.70 NR	798	Central American and Caribbean Games	(Colombia) Barranquilla	25 July 2018
200 m Medley	2:12.86 NR	855	Central American and Caribbean Championships	(Puerto Rico) San Juan	24 June 2021
400 m Medley	4:46.16	806	TYR Pro Swim Series	(United States) Columbus	7 July 2018

- This list include only above 750 Swimming points time.

Sporting positions
Preceded by (United States) Tevyn Waddell	Big Ten Conference Freshman of the Year; 2018	Succeeded by (United States) Max McHugh
