= Yeziel Morales =

Puerto Rican swimmer (born 1996)

Personal information
- Full name: Yeziel David Morales Miranda
- Born: 16 January 1996 (age 30) Bayamon, Puerto Rico

Sport
- Sport: Swimming
Medal record
Representing Puerto Rico
Central American and Caribbean Games
Silver medal – second place	2023 San Salvador	100 m backstroke
Silver medal – second place	2023 San Salvador	200 m backstroke
Silver medal – second place	2023 San Salvador	200 m butterfly
Bronze medal – third place	2014 Veracruz	200m backstroke
Bronze medal – third place	2018 Barranquilla	4x200m freestyle relay

Yeziel David Morales Miranda (born 16 January 1996) is a Puerto Rican swimmer. He represented Puerto Rico at the World Aquatics Championships in 2012, 2013, 2015, 2016, 2017, 2018, 2019 ,2021, 2022, 2023 and 2024.

In 2014, he competed at the 2014 Summer Youth Olympics held in Nanjing, China.

In 2014, he won bronze in the men's 200 metre backstroke event at the 2014 Central American and Caribbean Games held in Veracruz, Mexico. In 2018, he won the bronze medal in the men's 4 x 200 metre freestyle relay event at the 2018 Central American and Caribbean Games held in Barranquilla, Colombia.

In 2019, he competed in the men's 100 metre backstroke, men's 200 metre backstroke and the men's 4 × 200 metre freestyle relay events at the 2019 Pan American Games held in Lima, Peru.

== Major results ==
=== Individual ===
==== Long course ====
Year	Competition	Venue	Position	Event	Notes
Representing Puerto Rico
2014	Central American and Caribbean Games	Veracruz, Mexico	3rd	200 m backstroke	2:03.86
2019	Pan American Games	Lima, Peru	9th (h)	100 m backstroke	55.78NR
2019	Pan American Games	Lima, Peru	5th (h)	200 m backstroke	2:00.27NR
2023	Central American and Caribbean Games	Santa Tecla, El Salvador	2nd	100 m backstroke	56.05
2023	Central American and Caribbean Games	Santa Tecla, El Salvador	2nd	200 m backstroke	2:00.70
2023	Central American and Caribbean Games	Santa Tecla, El Salvador	2nd	200 m butterfly	1:59.05
2023	World Championships	Fukuoka, Japan	25th (h)	200 m backstroke	2:00.76
2023	World Championships	Fukuoka, Japan	25th (h)	200 m butterfly	1:59.10
2023	Pan American Games	Santiago, Chile	8th (h)	100 m backstroke	56.38
2023	Pan American Games	Santiago, Chile	4th (h)	200 m backstroke	2:00.23
2024	Summer Olympics	Paris, France		100 m backstroke	
2024	Summer Olympics	Paris, France		200 m backstroke	

=== Relay ===
==== Long course ====
Year	Competition	Venue	Team	Position	Event	Notes
Representing Puerto Rico
2018	Central American and Caribbean Games	Barranquilla, Colombia	Bayo / Arroyo / Solivan /Morales	3rd	4 × 200 m freestyle relay	7:27.29
2019	Pan American Games	Lima, Peru	Morales / Bayo / Cancel / Arroyo /	5th	4 × 200 m freestyle relay	7:36.13
