= Puerto Rico at the 2011 World Aquatics Championships =

Sporting delegation

Flag of Puerto Rico

Puerto Rico competed at the 2011 World Aquatics Championships in Shanghai, China between July 16 and 31, 2011.

== Swimming ==
Puerto Rico qualified 3 swimmers.

Men

Athlete	Event	Heats		Semifinals		Final	
Athlete	Event	Time	Rank	Time	Rank	Time	Rank
Raul Martinez	Men's 200m Freestyle	1:52.93	44	did not advance			
Raul Martinez	Men's 400m Freestyle	3:58.35	32			did not advance	
Christian Bayo	Men's 800m Freestyle	8:17.02	37			did not advance	

Women

Athlete	Event	Heats		Semifinals		Final	
Athlete	Event	Time	Rank	Time	Rank	Time	Rank
Patricia Casellas	Women's 50m Breaststroke	33.62	25	did not advance			
Patricia Casellas	Women's 100m Breaststroke	1:13.16	35	did not advance			
