= Vietnam at the 2011 World Aquatics Championships =

Sporting event delegation

Flag of Vietnam

Vietnam competed at the 2011 World Aquatics Championships in Shanghai, China between July 16 and 31, 2011.

== Swimming ==
Vietnam qualified 3 swimmers.

Men

Athlete	Event	Heats		Semifinals		Final	
Athlete	Event	Time	Rank	Time	Rank	Time	Rank
Phạm Thành Nguyện	Men's 100m Freestyle	53.10	63	did not advance			
Phạm Thành Nguyện	Men's 200m Freestyle	1:55.33	48	did not advance			
Hoàng Quý Phước	Men's 100m Freestyle	52.11	55	did not advance			
Hoàng Quý Phước	Men's 100m Butterfly	54.39	39	did not advance			
Hoàng Quý Phước	Men's 200m Butterfly	2:05.42	38	did not advance			
Võ Thái Nguyên	Men's 200m Butterfly	2:01.25	33	did not advance			
Võ Thái Nguyên	Men's 400m IM	4:41.02	33			did not advance	
