= Christian Bayo =

Puerto Rican swimmer (born 1991)

Personal information
- Nationality: Puerto Rican
- Born: 12 April 1991 (age 35)

Sport
- Sport: Swimming
Medal record
Representing Puerto Rico
Central American and Caribbean Games
Bronze medal – third place	2010 Mayaguez	4x200m freestyle relay
Bronze medal – third place	2023 San Salvador	1500 m freestyle

Christian Bayo (born 12 April 1991) is a Puerto Rican swimmer. He competed in the men's 400 metre freestyle event at the 2017 World Aquatics Championships. In 2019, he competed in the men's 400 metre freestyle event at the 2019 World Aquatics Championships held in Gwangju, South Korea and he did not qualify to compete in the final.
