= Swimming at the 2023 World Aquatics Championships – Women's 4 × 100 metre medley relay =

Women's 4 × 100 metre medley relay at the 2023 World Aquatics Championships
- Venue: Marine Messe Fukuoka
- Location: Fukuoka, Japan
- Dates: 30 July (heats and final)
- Competitors: 106 from 23 nations
- Teams: 23
- Winning time: 3:52.08

Medalists
gold medal	Regan Smith; Lilly King; Gretchen Walsh; Kate Douglass; Katharine Berkoff; Lydia Jacoby; Torri Huske; Abbey Weitzeil	United States
silver medal	Kaylee McKeown; Abbey Harkin; Emma McKeon; Mollie O'Callaghan; Madison Wilson; Brianna Throssell; Meg Harris	Australia
bronze medal	Kylie Masse; Sophie Angus; Maggie Mac Neil; Summer McIntosh; Ingrid Wilm; Mary-Sophie Harvey	Canada

The women's 4 × 100 metre medley relay competition at the 2023 World Aquatics Championships was held on 30 July 2023.

== Records ==
Prior to the competition, the existing world and championship records were as follows.

World record	United States; Regan Smith (57.57); Lilly King (1:04.81); Kelsi Dahlia (56.16); Simone Manuel (51.86)	3:50.40	Gwangju, South Korea	28 July 2019
Competition record	United States; Regan Smith (57.57); Lilly King (1:04.81); Kelsi Dahlia (56.16); Simone Manuel (51.86)	3:50.40	Gwangju, South Korea	28 July 2019

== Results ==
=== Heats ===
The heats were held at 11:14.

Rank	Heat	Lane	Nation	Swimmers	Time	Notes
1	3	5	Canada	Ingrid Wilm (59.11); Sophie Angus (1:06.30); Maggie Mac Neil (56.53); Mary-Sophie Harvey (53.99)	3:55.93	Q
2	3	4	United States	Katharine Berkoff (58.56); Lydia Jacoby (1:07.73); Torri Huske (57.42); Abbey Weitzeil (52.60)	3:56.31	Q
3	2	5	Sweden	Michelle Coleman (1:01.51); Sophie Hansson (1:06.67); Louise Hansson (56.90); Sarah Sjöström (52.41)	3:57.49	Q
4	2	4	Australia	Madison Wilson (59.54); Abbey Harkin (1:07.66); Brianna Throssell (57.72); Meg Harris (52.82)	3:57.74	Q
5	2	3	Netherlands	Kira Toussaint (1:00.57); Tes Schouten (1:06.79); Kim Busch (58.46); Marrit Steenbergen (51.99)	3:57.81	Q
6	2	6	China	Wang Xueer (1:00.42); Yang Chang (1:07.12); Wang Yichun (57.17); Wu Qingfeng (53.42)	3:58.13	Q
7	3	3	France	Pauline Mahieu (59.82); Charlotte Bonnet (1:06.87); Marie Wattel (57.08); Lison Nowaczyk (54.77)	3:58.54	Q
8	2	7	Japan	Rio Shirai (1:00.60); Reona Aoki (1:06.57); Ai Soma (57.48); Rikako Ikee (53.93)	3:58.58	Q
9	3	2	Great Britain	Lauren Cox (59.79); Kara Hanlon (1:07.39); Laura Stephens (58.66); Anna Hopkin (53.11)	3:58.95	
10	2	2	Poland	Adela Piskorska (1:00.47); Dominika Sztandera (1:07.01); Paulina Peda (58.57); Kornelia Fiedkiewicz (54.18)	4:00.23	NR
11	3	6	Italy	Margherita Panziera (1:00.60); Martina Carraro (1:06.39); Ilaria Bianchi (59.08); Sofia Morini (54.60)	4:00.67	
12	3	8	Germany	Laura Riedemann (1:01.68); Anna Elendt (1:07.23); Angelina Köhler (56.77); Nele Schulze (55.03)	4:00.71	
13	3	9	Ireland	Danielle Hill (1:01.65); Mona McSharry (1:05.55); Ellen Walshe (59.19); Victoria Catterson (54.86)	4:01.25	NR
14	2	0	Denmark	Julie Kepp Jensen (1:03.33); Thea Blomsterberg (1:06.92); Helena Rosendahl Bach (58.51); Signe Bro (54.57)	4:03.33	
15	1	6	Belgium	Roos Vanotterdijk (1:00.91); Florine Gaspard (1:09.14); Valentine Dumont (59.09); Fleur Verdonck (55.40)	4:04.54	NR
16	1	3	Hong Kong	Stephanie Au (1:00.75); Siobhán Haughey (1:07.49); Tam Hoi Lam (1:00.96); Camille Cheng (55.69)	4:04.89	
17	1	4	Greece	Theodora Drakou (1:00.71 NR); Eleni Kontogeorgou (1:10.23); Anna Ntountounaki (58.26); Maria-Thalia Drasidou (55.79)	4:04.99	
18	2	1	South Korea	Lee Eun-ji (1:01.31); Kwon Se-hyun (1:09.94); Kim Seo-yeong (59.74); Hur Yeon-kyung (54.17)	4:05.16	
19	3	7	Israel	Aviv Barzelay (1:02.13); Anastasia Gorbenko (1:06.94); Lea Polonsky (1:00.48); Daria Golovaty (56.02)	4:05.57	
20	3	0	Spain	Carmen Weiler (1:01.46); Jessica Vall (1:08.32); Paula Juste (1:00.27); Ainhoa Campabadal (55.80)	4:05.85	
21	3	1	Brazil	Julia Góes (1:03.96); Jhennifer Conceição (1:08.48); Giovanna Diamante (59.32); Stephanie Balduccini (54.10)	4:05.86	
22	1	5	Mexico	Miranda Grana (1:02.11); Melissa Rodríguez (1:08.80); María José Mata (59.54); Athena Meneses (56.40)	4:06.85	NR
23	2	9	Thailand	Saovanee Boonamphai (1:06.39); Phiangkhwan Pawapotako (1:12.25); Kamonchanok Kwanmuang (1:01.97); Jenjira Srisaard (59.82)	4:20.43	
	2	8	Hungary	DNS		

=== Final ===
The final was held at 21:37.

Rank	Lane	Nation	Swimmers	Time	Notes
1st place, gold medalist(s)	5	United States	Regan Smith (57.68); Lilly King (1:04.93); Gretchen Walsh (57.06); Kate Douglass (52.41)	3:52.08	
2nd place, silver medalist(s)	6	Australia	Kaylee McKeown (57.91); Abbey Harkin (1:07.07); Emma McKeon (56.44); Mollie O'Callaghan (51.95)	3:53.37	
3rd place, bronze medalist(s)	4	Canada	Kylie Masse (58.74); Sophie Angus (1:06.21); Maggie Mac Neil (55.69); Summer McIntosh (53.48)	3:54.12	
4	7	China	Wan Letian (59.49); Tang Qianting (1:06.13); Zhang Yufei (55.50); Cheng Yujie (53.45)	3:54.57	
5	3	Sweden	Michelle Coleman (1:01.08); Sophie Hansson (1:06.34); Louise Hansson (56.82); Sarah Sjöström (52.08)	3:56.32	
6	8	Japan	Rio Shirai (1:00.96); Satomi Suzuki (1:05.73); Ai Soma (57.67); Rikako Ikee (53.66)	3:58.02	
7	2	Netherlands	Kira Toussaint (1:00.34); Tes Schouten (1:06.91); Kim Busch (58.88); Marrit Steenbergen (51.96)	3:58.09	
8	1	France	Pauline Mahieu (1:00.12); Charlotte Bonnet (1:06.78); Marie Wattel (57.72); Lison Nowaczyk (54.62)	3:59.24	
