= 2024 World Aquatics Swimming Championships (25 m) – Women's 100 metre backstroke =

Swimming competition

Women's 100 metre backstroke at the 2024 World Aquatics Swimming Championships (25 m)
- Venue: Duna Arena
- Location: Budapest, Hungary
- Dates: 10 December (heats and semifinals); 11 December (final)
- Competitors: 63 from 57 nations
- Winning time: 54.55

Medalists
gold medal	Regan Smith	United States
silver medal	Katharine Berkoff	United States
bronze medal	Ingrid Wilm	Canada

The women's 100 metre backstroke event at the 2024 World Aquatics Swimming Championships (25 m) was held from 10 to 11 December 2024 at the Duna Arena in Budapest, Hungary.

== Records ==
Prior to the competition, the existing world and championship records were as follows.

World record	Regan Smith (USA)	54.27	Singapore	1 November 2024
Competition record	Katinka Hosszu (HUN)	55.03	Doha, Qatar	4 December 2014

The following record was established during the competition:

Date	Event	Name	Nationality	Time	Record
11 December	Final	Regan Smith	United States	54.55	CR

== Results ==
=== Heats ===
The heats were started on 10 December at 9:32.

Rank	Heat	Lane	Name	Nationality	Time	Notes
1	7	4	Regan Smith	United States	55.86	Q
2	6	4	Iona Anderson	Australia	56.25	Q
3	6	2	Katharine Berkoff	United States	56.33	Q
4	6	5	Anastasiya Shkurdai	Neutral Athletes A	56.50	Q
5	6	7	Kylie Masse	Canada	56.58	Q
6	7	5	Ingrid Wilm	Canada	56.66	Q
7	6	0	Carmen Weiler	Spain	56.68	Q, NR
8	5	5	Qian Xinan	China	56.69	Q
9	6	9	Miranda Grana	Neutral Athletes C	56.83	Q, NR
10	6	3	Maaike de Waard	Netherlands	57.01	Q
11	5	3	Louise Hansson	Sweden	57.14	Q
12	7	3	Pauline Mahieu	France	57.18	Q
13	6	6	Hanna Rosvall	Sweden	57.26	Q
14	7	6	Mizuki Hirai	Japan	57.29	Q
15	5	2	Helena Gasson	New Zealand	57.43	Q
16	5	6	Zheng Huiyu	China	57.52	Q
17	5	4	Kira Toussaint	Netherlands	57.55	R
18	7	7	Giulia D'Innocenzo	Italy	57.82	R
19	7	2	Danielle Hill	Ireland	57.95	
20	5	7	Elizaveta Agapitova	Neutral Athletes B	58.19	
21	5	0	Adela Piskorska	Poland	58.31	
22	7	1	Milana Stepanova	Neutral Athletes B	58.47	
23	4	4	Xeniya Ignatova	Kazakhstan	59.01	
24	7	0	Gabriela Georgieva	Bulgaria	59.06	
25	4	5	Fanny Teijonsalo	Finland	59.27	
26	6	8	Milla Drakopoulos	South Africa	59.33	
27	5	1	Dora Molnar	Hungary	59.37	
28	6	1	Aissia Prisecariu	Romania	59.39	
29	4	1	Abril Aunchayna	Uruguay	59.56	NR
29	4	3	Justine Murdock	Lithuania	59.56	NR
31	7	9	Chloe Isleta	Philippines	59.71	
32	5	8	Cindy Cheung	Hong Kong	59.89	
33	7	8	Kim Seung-won	South Korea	59.95	
34	4	6	Carla González	Venezuela	1:00.11	
35	4	2	Zuri Ferguson	Trinidad and Tobago	1:00.12	NR
36	3	7	Masniari Wolf	Indonesia	1:00.43	NR
37	3	5	Teresa Ivan	Slovakia	1:00.45	
38	3	4	Elizabeth Jiménez	Dominican Republic	1:00.57	
39	4	0	Laurent Estrada	Cuba	1:00.74	
40	5	9	Nika Sharafutdinova	Ukraine	1:00.79	
41	2	4	Jessica Humphrey	Namibia	1:00.95	
42	4	9	Melissa Diego	Guatemala	1:01.23	NR
43	4	8	Danielle Titus	Barbados	1:01.58	
44	3	6	Logan Watson-Brown	Bermuda	1:01.68	
45	3	2	Elisabeth Erlendsdóttir	Faroe Islands	1:02.60	
46	2	7	Ashley Calderón	Honduras	1:02.83	NR
47	2	5	Lara Giménez	Paraguay	1:03.10	NR
48	3	1	Anishta Teeluck	Mauritius	1:03.40	
49	3	3	Natalia Zaiteva	Moldova	1:03.41	
50	2	3	Taline Mourad	Lebanon	1:03.54	NR
51	2	2	Leanna Wainwright	Jamaica	1:04.18	NR
52	3	8	Ganga Senavirathne	Sri Lanka	1:04.40	
53	4	7	Enkh-Amgalangiin Ariuntamir	Mongolia	1:04.46	
54	3	0	Wong Un Iao	Macau	1:04.64	
55	3	9	Mia Laban	Cook Islands	1:04.96	
56	2	6	Idealy Tendrinavalona	Madagascar	1:05.59	NR
57	2	8	Aaliyah Palestrini	Seychelles	1:06.67	
58	2	1	Nubia Adjei	Ghana	1:07.58	
59	1	3	Piper Raho	Northern Mariana Islands	1:09.62	
60	1	5	Juthi Akter	Bangladesh	1:11.25	NR
61	2	0	Ammara Pinto	Malawi	1:17.28	
62	1	4	Aliyana Kachra	Tanzania	1:22.52	
63	2	9	Chloe Ameara	Vanuatu	1:25.21	

=== Semifinals ===
The semifinals were started on 10 December at 18:24.

Rank	Heat	Lane	Name	Nationality	Time	Notes
1	2	4	Regan Smith	United States	55.05	Q
2	2	5	Katharine Berkoff	United States	55.37	Q
3	1	3	Ingrid Wilm	Canada	55.85	Q
4	1	4	Iona Anderson	Australia	55.99	Q
5	2	3	Kylie Masse	Canada	56.06	Q
6	1	5	Anastasiya Shkurdai	Neutral Athletes A	56.07	Q, NR
7	2	6	Carmen Weiler	Spain	56.09	Q, NR
8	2	7	Louise Hansson	Sweden	56.17	Q
9	1	7	Pauline Mahieu	France	56.36	R
10	2	2	Miranda Grana	Neutral Athletes C	56.62	R, NR
11	1	6	Qian Xinan	China	56.79	
12	1	2	Maaike de Waard	Netherlands	56.94	
13	2	1	Hanna Rosvall	Sweden	57.24	
14	1	1	Mizuki Hirai	Japan	57.44	
15	2	8	Helena Gasson	New Zealand	57.64	
16	1	8	Zheng Huiyu	China	58.07	

=== Final ===
The final was held on 11 December at 17:32.

Rank	Lane	Name	Nationality	Time	Notes
1st place, gold medalist(s)	4	Regan Smith	United States	54.55	CR
2nd place, silver medalist(s)	5	Katharine Berkoff	United States	54.93	
3rd place, bronze medalist(s)	3	Ingrid Wilm	Canada	55.75	
4	6	Iona Anderson	Australia	56.08	
5	7	Anastasiya Shkurdai	Neutral Athletes A	56.11	
6	2	Kylie Masse	Canada	56.21	
7	1	Carmen Weiler	Spain	56.39	
8	8	Louise Hansson	Sweden	56.52	
