= Swimming at the 2023 World Aquatics Championships – Women's 50 metre backstroke =

Women's 50 metre backstroke at the 2023 World Aquatics Championships
- Venue: Marine Messe Fukuoka
- Location: Fukuoka, Japan
- Dates: 26 July (heats and semifinals); 27 July (final)
- Competitors: 61 from 54 nations
- Winning time: 27.08

Medalists
gold medal	Kaylee McKeown	Australia
silver medal	Regan Smith	United States
bronze medal	Lauren Cox	Great Britain

The women's 50 metre backstroke competition at the 2023 World Aquatics Championships was held on 26 and 27 July 2023.

== Records ==
Prior to the competition, the existing world and championship records were as follows.

World record	Liu Xiang (CHN)	26.98	Jakarta, Indonesia	21 August 2018
Competition record	Zhao Jing (CHN)	27.06	Rome, Italy	30 July 2009

== Results ==
=== Heats ===
The heats were started on 26 July at 10:32.

Rank	Heat	Lane	Name	Nationality	Time	Notes
1	6	4	Regan Smith	United States	27.31	Q
2	5	4	Kylie Masse	Canada	27.48	Q
3	7	4	Katharine Berkoff	United States	27.56	Q
4	6	5	Kaylee McKeown	Australia	27.60	Q
5	7	2	Mary-Ambre Moluh	France	27.69	Q
6	5	5	Ingrid Wilm	Canada	27.75	Q
7	6	3	Wan Letian	China	27.84	Q
7	7	1	Miki Takahashi	Japan	27.84	Q
9	6	6	Wang Xueer	China	27.89	Q
10	5	3	Maaike de Waard	Netherlands	27.91	Q
11	7	6	Lauren Cox	Great Britain	27.98	Q
12	7	5	Analia Pigrée	France	28.01	Q
13	5	1	Danielle Hill	Ireland	28.03	Q
14	6	2	Simona Kubová	Czech Republic	28.14	Q
15	6	7	Theodora Drakou	Greece	28.20	Q
16	5	9	Andrea Berrino	Argentina	28.24	Q
17	5	8	Lora Komoróczy	Hungary	28.29	
18	7	7	Adela Piskorska	Poland	28.35	
19	5	0	Lee Eun-ji	South Korea	28.40	
19	6	1	Paulina Peda	Poland	28.40	
21	5	6	Kira Toussaint	Netherlands	28.41	
22	6	0	Louise Hansson	Sweden	28.42	
23	6	8	Costanza Cocconcelli	Italy	28.51	
24	7	9	Carmen Weiler Sastre	Spain	28.59	
25	7	0	Margherita Panziera	Italy	28.61	
26	4	4	Ingeborg Løyning	Norway	28.62	
27	6	9	Stephanie Au	Hong Kong	28.63	
28	4	2	Camila Rebelo	Portugal	28.65	
29	5	7	Roos Vanotterdijk	Belgium	28.69	
30	7	8	Julie Kepp Jensen	Denmark	28.77	
31	4	7	Emma Harvey	Bermuda	28.79	
32	4	6	Tayde Sansores	Mexico	28.91	
33	4	5	Nina Kost	Switzerland	29.00	
34	4	3	Julia Góes	Brazil	29.09	
35	4	0	Xeniya Ignatova	Kazakhstan	29.25	
36	3	4	Wu Yi-en	Chinese Taipei	29.28	
37	4	8	Milla Drakopoulos	South Africa	29.31	
38	4	1	Saovanee Boonamphai	Thailand	29.46	
39	3	2	Elisabeth Erlendsdóttir	Faroe Islands	29.94	
40	4	9	Abril Aunchayna	Uruguay	30.04	
41	3	5	Alexia Sotomayor	Peru	30.12	
42	2	9	Mia Phiri	Zambia	30.17	NR
43	3	6	Donata Katai	Zimbabwe	30.21	
44	3	3	Mia Blaževska Eminova	North Macedonia	30.41	
45	3	1	Eda Zeqiri	Kosovo	30.96	
46	3	7	Marie Khoury	Lebanon	31.14	
47	1	6	Gaurika Singh	Nepal	31.44	
48	3	8	Nubia Adjei	Ghana	31.61	
49	3	0	Chanchakriya Kheum	Cambodia	31.90	
50	2	4	Denise Donelli	Mozambique	32.39	
51	2	8	Idealy Tendrinavalona	Madagascar	32.41	
52	2	7	Cheang Weng Lam	Macau	32.48	
53	3	9	Ariuntamir Enkh-Amgalan	Mongolia	32.54	
54	2	0	Shoko Litulumar	Northern Mariana Islands	34.25	
55	1	4	Ria Save	Tanzania	34.71	
56	2	1	Kayla Hepler	Marshall Islands	34.73	
57	2	5	Hamna Ahmed	Maldives	35.11	
58	2	6	Noelani Malia Day	Tonga	35.37	
59	2	3	Nafissath Radji	Benin	35.40	
60	2	2	Tayamika Chang'Anamuno	Malawi	36.03	
61	1	3	Rana Saadeldin	Sudan	36.32	NR
	1	5	Ruth Turay	Sierra Leone	Did not start	
	5	2	Anastasia Gorbenko	Israel	Did not start	
	7	3	Mollie O'Callaghan	Australia	Did not start	

=== Semifinals ===
The semifinals were started on 26 July at 20:36.

Rank	Heat	Lane	Name	Nationality	Time	Notes
1	2	4	Regan Smith	United States	27.10	Q, AM
2	1	5	Kaylee McKeown	Australia	27.26	Q
3	2	7	Lauren Cox	Great Britain	27.29	Q
4	1	4	Kylie Masse	Canada	27.49	Q
4	2	5	Katharine Berkoff	United States	27.49	Q
6	1	7	Analia Pigrée	France	27.70	Q
7	1	3	Ingrid Wilm	Canada	27.71	Q
8	2	2	Wang Xueer	China	27.74	
8	2	6	Wan Letian	China	27.74	
10	2	3	Mary-Ambre Moluh	France	27.82	
11	2	8	Theodora Drakou	Greece	27.87	NR
12	1	2	Maaike de Waard	Netherlands	28.03	
13	2	1	Danielle Hill	Ireland	28.10	
14	1	6	Miki Takahashi	Japan	28.13	
15	1	1	Simona Kubová	Czech Republic	28.16	
16	1	8	Andrea Berrino	Argentina	28.34	

==== Swim-off ====
The swim-off was held on 26 July at 22:14.

Rank	Lane	Name	Nationality	Time	Notes
1	4	Wang Xueer	China	27.78	Q
2	5	Wan Letian	China	27.90	

=== Final ===
The final was held on 27 July at 20:36.

Rank	Lane	Name	Nationality	Time	Notes
1st place, gold medalist(s)	5	Kaylee McKeown	Australia	27.08	OC
2nd place, silver medalist(s)	4	Regan Smith	United States	27.11	
3rd place, bronze medalist(s)	6	Lauren Cox	Great Britain	27.20	
4	3	Kylie Masse	Canada	27.28	
5	2	Katharine Berkoff	United States	27.38	
6	1	Ingrid Wilm	Canada	27.41	
7	8	Wang Xueer	China	27.99	
8	7	Analia Pigrée	France	28.04	
