= Swimming at the 2023 World Aquatics Championships – Women's 100 metre backstroke =

Women's 100 metre backstroke at the 2023 World Aquatics Championships
- Venue: Marine Messe Fukuoka
- Location: Fukuoka, Japan
- Dates: 24 July (heats and semifinals); 25 July (final)
- Competitors: 61 from 54 nations
- Winning time: 57.53

Medalists
gold medal	Kaylee McKeown	Australia
silver medal	Regan Smith	United States
bronze medal	Katharine Berkoff	United States

The women's 100 metre backstroke competition at the 2023 World Aquatics Championships was held on 24 and 25 July 2023.

== Records ==
Prior to the competition, the existing world and championship records were as follows.

World record	Kaylee McKeown (AUS)	57.45	Adelaide, Australia	13 June 2021
Competition record	Regan Smith (USA)	57.57	Gwangju, South Korea	28 July 2019

The following new records were set during this competition.

Date	Event	Name	Nationality	Time	Record
25 July	Final	Kaylee McKeown	Australia	57.53	CR

== Results ==
=== Heats ===
The heats were started on 24 July at 10:32.

Rank	Heat	Lane	Name	Nationality	Time	Notes
1	6	4	Regan Smith	United States	58.47	Q
2	7	4	Kaylee McKeown	Australia	58.90	Q
3	5	4	Katharine Berkoff	United States	59.04	Q
4	7	5	Kylie Masse	Canada	59.14	Q
5	6	3	Wan Letian	China	59.52	Q
6	7	2	Pauline Mahieu	France	59.60	Q
7	6	6	Maaike de Waard	Netherlands	59.89	Q
8	5	5	Wang Xueer	China	59.93	Q
9	6	5	Ingrid Wilm	Canada	59.96	Q
10	5	7	Madison Wilson	Australia	1:00.04	Q
11	6	1	Lauren Cox	Great Britain	1:00.10	Q
12	7	6	Medi Harris	Great Britain	1:00.11	Q
13	5	3	Margherita Panziera	Italy	1:00.40	Q
14	5	1	Simona Kubová	Czech Republic	1:00.45	Q
15	7	0	Hanna Rosvall	Sweden	1:00.46	Q
15	7	3	Kira Toussaint	Netherlands	1:00.46	Q
17	5	2	Adela Piskorska	Poland	1:00.51	
18	6	8	Lee Eun-ji	South Korea	1:00.56	
19	4	4	Helena Gasson	New Zealand	1:00.83	
19	7	1	Rio Shirai	Japan	1:00.83	
21	7	7	Carmen Weiler	Spain	1:00.87	
22	5	6	Roos Vanotterdijk	Belgium	1:00.95	
23	7	9	Stephanie Au	Hong Kong	1:01.08	
24	6	0	Camila Rebelo	Portugal	1:01.27	
25	5	8	Ingeborg Løyning	Norway	1:01.32	
26	6	2	Paulina Peda	Poland	1:01.40	
27	7	8	Danielle Hill	Ireland	1:01.51	
28	4	3	Aviv Barzelay	Israel	1:01.66	
28	4	6	Gabriela Georgieva	Bulgaria	1:01.66	
30	6	7	Analia Pigrée	France	1:01.67	
31	6	9	Nina Kost	Switzerland	1:02.03	
32	4	1	Xeniya Ignatova	Kazakhstan	1:02.34	
32	4	5	Andrea Berrino	Argentina	1:02.34	
34	5	0	Dóra Molnár	Hungary	1:02.62	
35	4	8	Milla Drakopoulos	South Africa	1:02.77	
36	4	7	Julia Góes	Brazil	1:02.87	
37	5	9	Miranda Grana	Mexico	1:02.91	
38	3	4	McKenna DeBever	Peru	1:03.12	
39	4	9	Emma Harvey	Bermuda	1:03.14	
40	4	2	Tatiana Salcuțan	Moldova	1:03.18	
41	3	5	Elizabeth Jiménez	Dominican Republic	1:03.45	
42	3	1	Andrea Becali	Cuba	1:04.27	
43	3	6	Danielle Titus	Barbados	1:04.40	
44	3	3	Saovanee Boonamphai	Thailand	1:04.53	
45	4	0	Abril Aunchayna	Uruguay	1:04.66	
46	3	2	Carolina Cermelli	Panama	1:04.85	
46	3	8	Donata Katai	Zimbabwe	1:04.85	
48	3	0	Ganga Malwaththage	Sri Lanka	1:04.86	
49	3	7	Anishta Teeluck	Mauritius	1:05.32	
50	1	3	Felicity Passon	Seychelles	1:05.35	
51	1	4	Gaurika Singh	Nepal	1:06.80	
52	3	9	Eda Zeqiri	Kosovo	1:07.17	
53	2	5	Ariuntamir Enkh-Amgalan	Mongolia	1:08.59	NR
54	2	1	Cheang Weng Lam	Macau	1:08.60	
55	2	4	Aynura Primova	Turkmenistan	1:08.97	
56	2	8	Idealy Tendrinavalona	Madagascar	1:10.29	
57	2	3	Chanchakriya Kheun	Cambodia	1:10.51	
58	2	6	Jennifer Harding-Marlin	Saint Kitts and Nevis	1:12.19	
59	1	5	Abigail Ai Tom	Papua New Guinea	1:14.69	
60	2	2	Hamna Ahmed	Maldives	1:18.17	NR
61	2	7	Ammara Pinto	Malawi	1:22.06	

=== Semifinals ===
The semifinals were started on 24 July at 20:53.

Rank	Heat	Lane	Name	Nationality	Time	Notes
1	2	4	Regan Smith	United States	58.33	Q
2	1	4	Kaylee McKeown	Australia	58.48	Q
3	2	5	Katharine Berkoff	United States	58.60	Q
4	1	5	Kylie Masse	Canada	59.06	Q
5	1	3	Pauline Mahieu	France	59.30	Q, NR
6	2	2	Ingrid Wilm	Canada	59.35	Q
7	2	3	Wan Letian	China	59.49	Q
8	1	7	Medi Harris	Great Britain	59.62	Q
9	1	2	Madison Wilson	Australia	59.63	
10	2	7	Lauren Cox	Great Britain	59.79	
11	2	6	Maaike de Waard	Netherlands	59.84	
12	1	8	Kira Toussaint	Netherlands	59.89	
13	1	6	Wang Xueer	China	59.96	
14	1	1	Simona Kubová	Czech Republic	1:00.43	
15	2	8	Hanna Rosvall	Sweden	1:00.65	
16	2	1	Margherita Panziera	Italy	1:01.31	

=== Final ===
The final was held on 25 July at 20:51.

Rank	Lane	Name	Nationality	Time	Notes
1st place, gold medalist(s)	5	Kaylee McKeown	Australia	57.53	CR
2nd place, silver medalist(s)	4	Regan Smith	United States	57.78	
3rd place, bronze medalist(s)	3	Katharine Berkoff	United States	58.25	
4	6	Kylie Masse	Canada	59.09	
5	7	Ingrid Wilm	Canada	59.31	
6	2	Pauline Mahieu	France	59.72	
7	8	Medi Harris	Great Britain	59.84	
8	1	Wan Letian	China	1:00.39	
