= Swimming at the 2022 Commonwealth Games – Women's 4 × 100 metre medley relay =

Women's 4 × 100 metre medley relay at the 2022 Commonwealth Games
- Venue: Sandwell Aquatics Centre
- Dates: 3 August
- Competitors: 24 from 6 nations
- Winning time: 3:54.44

Medalists
gold medal	Kaylee McKeown; Chelsea Hodges; Emma McKeon; Mollie O'Callaghan	Australia
silver medal	Kylie Masse; Sophie Angus; Maggie Mac Neil; Summer McIntosh	Canada
bronze medal	Lauren Cox; Molly Renshaw; Laura Stephens; Anna Hopkin	England

The women's 4 × 100 metre medley relay event at the 2022 Commonwealth Games was held on 3 August at the Sandwell Aquatics Centre.

== Records ==
Prior to this competition, the existing world, Commonwealth and Games records were as follows:

World record	United States (USA); Regan Smith; Lilly King; Kelsi Dahlia; Simone Manuel	3:50.40	Gwangju, South Korea	28 July 2019
Commonwealth record	Australia (AUS); Kaylee McKeown; Chelsea Hodges; Emma McKeon; Cate Campbell	3:51.60	Tokyo, Japan	1 August 2021
Games record	Australia; Emily Seebohm; Georgia Bohl; Emma McKeon; Bronte Campbell	3:54.36	Gold Coast, Australia	10 April 2018

== Schedule ==
The schedule is as follows:

All times are British Summer Time (UTC+1)

Date	Time	Round
Wednesday 3 August 2022	21:08	Final

== Results ==
=== Final ===
Rank	Lane	Nation	Swimmers	Time	Notes
1st place, gold medalist(s)	5	Australia	Kaylee McKeown (58.79); Chelsea Hodges (1:06.68); Emma McKeon (56.59); Mollie O'Callaghan (52.38)	3:54.44	
2nd place, silver medalist(s)	4	Canada	Kylie Masse (59.01); Sophie Angus (1:07.66); Maggie Mac Neil (56.59); Summer McIntosh (53.33)	3:56.59	
3rd place, bronze medalist(s)	3	England	Lauren Cox (1:00.72); Molly Renshaw (1:06.61); Laura Stephens (58.96); Anna Hopkin (53.15)	3:59.44	
4	6	South Africa	Rebecca Meder (1:01.39); Lara van Niekerk (1:05.56); Erin Gallagher (58.88); Aimee Canny (53.80)	3:59.63	AF
5	2	Scotland	Katie Shanahan (1:02.27); Kara Hanlon (1:07.54); Keanna Macinnes (1:00.07); Lucy Hope (54.95)	4:04.83	NR
6	7	Guernsey	Tatiana Tostevin (1:05.27); Laura le Cras (1:14.82); Orla Rabey (1:02.36); Molly Staples (1:00.92)	4:23.37	
