= Swimming at the 2023 World Aquatics Championships =

- Host city: Fukuoka, Japan
- Date: 23–30 July
- Venue: Marine Messe Fukuoka
- Events: 42

The swimming events at the 2023 World Aquatics Championships were held from 23 to 30 July 2023 at the Marine Messe Fukuoka Hall A in Fukuoka, Japan. Léon Marchand of France won the Male Swimmer of the Championships award and Kaylee McKeown of Australia won the Female Swimmer of Championships award based on individual point score. The United States won the Team of the Championships award based on team point score. World Records were broken in six individual and three relay events. China's Qin Haiyang and Australia's McKeown became the first male and female athletes at a World Aquatics Championships to win the 50 m, 100 m & 200 m events in a single stroke, at a single World Aquatics Championships.

== Schedule ==
42 events were held.

All times are local (UTC+9).

H	Heats	½	Semi finals	F	Final

M = Morning session (starting at 10:30), E = Evening session (starting at 20:00)

Men
Date →	Sun 23		Mon 24		Tue 25		Wed 26		Thu 27		Fri 28		Sat 29		Sun 30	
Event ↓	M	E	M	E	M	E	M	E	M	E	M	E	M	E	M	E
50 m freestyle											H	½		F		
100 m freestyle							H	½		F						
200 m freestyle			H	½		F										
400 m freestyle	H	F														
800 m freestyle					H			F								
1500 m freestyle													H			F
50 m backstroke													H	½		F
100 m backstroke			H	½		F										
200 m backstroke									H	½		F				
50 m breaststroke					H	½		F								
100 m breaststroke	H	½		F												
200 m breaststroke									H	½		F				
50 m butterfly	H	½		F												
100 m butterfly											H	½		F		
200 m butterfly					H	½		F								
200 m individual medley							H	½		F						
400 m individual medley	H	F														
4 × 100 metre freestyle relay	H	F														
4 × 200 metre freestyle relay											H	F				
4 × 100 metre medley relay															H	F

Women
Date →	Sun 23		Mon 24		Tue 25		Wed 26		Thu 27		Fri 28		Sat 29		Sun 30	
Event ↓	M	E	M	E	M	E	M	E	M	E	M	E	M	E	M	E
50 m freestyle													H	½		F
100 m freestyle									H	½		F				
200 m freestyle					H	½		F								
400 m freestyle	H	F														
800 m freestyle											H			F		
1500 m freestyle			H			F										
50 m backstroke							H	½		F						
100 m backstroke			H	½		F										
200 m backstroke											H	½		F		
50 m breaststroke													H	½		F
100 m breaststroke			H	½		F										
200 m breaststroke									H	½		F				
50 m butterfly											H	½		F		
100 m butterfly	H	½		F												
200 m butterfly							H	½		F						
200 m individual medley	H	½		F												
400 m individual medley															H	F
4 × 100 metre freestyle relay	H	F														
4 × 200 metre freestyle relay									H	F						
4 × 100 metre medley relay															H	F

Mixed
Date →	Sun 23		Mon 24		Tue 25		Wed 26		Thu 27		Fri 28		Sat 29		Sun 30	
Event ↓	M	E	M	E	M	E	M	E	M	E	M	E	M	E	M	E
4 × 100 m freestyle relay													H	F		
4 × 100 m medley relay							H	F								

== Medal summary ==
=== Medal table ===
* Host nation (Japan)

Rank	Nation	Gold	Silver	Bronze	Total
1	Australia	13	7	5	25
2	United States	7	20	11	38
3	China	5	3	8	16
4	France	4	0	2	6
5	Great Britain	2	2	4	8
6	Canada	2	2	2	6
7	Tunisia	2	1	0	3
8	Lithuania	2	0	0	2
8	Sweden	2	0	0	2
10	Italy	1	4	1	6
11	South Africa	1	1	0	2
12	Hungary	1	0	0	1
13	Netherlands	0	1	2	3
14	Hong Kong	0	1	0	1
14	Poland	0	1	0	1
14	Portugal	0	1	0	1
17	Japan*	0	0	2	2
18	Germany	0	0	1	1
18	New Zealand	0	0	1	1
18	South Korea	0	0	1	1
18	Switzerland	0	0	1	1
Totals (21 entries)		42	44	41	127

=== Men ===
Event	Gold		Silver		Bronze	
50 metre freestyle	Cameron McEvoy; Australia	21.06 OC	Jack Alexy; United States	21.57	Ben Proud; Great Britain	21.58
100 metre freestyle	Kyle Chalmers; Australia	47.15	Jack Alexy; United States	47.31	Maxime Grousset; France	47.42
200 metre freestyle	Matt Richards; Great Britain	1:44.30	Tom Dean; Great Britain	1:44.32	Hwang Sun-woo; South Korea	1:44.42 NR
400 metre freestyle	Samuel Short; Australia	3:40.68	Ahmed Hafnaoui; Tunisia	3:40.70 AF	Lukas Märtens; Germany	3:42.20
800 metre freestyle	Ahmed Hafnaoui; Tunisia	7:37.00	Samuel Short; Australia	7:37.76 OC	Bobby Finke; United States	7:38.67 AM
1500 metre freestyle	Ahmed Hafnaoui; Tunisia	14:31.54 CR, AF	Bobby Finke; United States	14:31.59 AM	Samuel Short; Australia	14:37.28
50 metre backstroke	Hunter Armstrong; United States	24.05	Justin Ress; United States	24.24	Xu Jiayu; China	24.50
100 metre backstroke	Ryan Murphy; United States	52.22	Thomas Ceccon; Italy	52.27	Hunter Armstrong; United States	52.58
200 metre backstroke	Hubert Kós; Hungary	1:54.14 NR	Ryan Murphy; United States	1:54.83	Roman Mityukov; Switzerland	1:55.34 NR
50 metre breaststroke	Qin Haiyang; China	26.29	Nic Fink; United States	26.59	Sun Jiajun; China	26.79
100 metre breaststroke	Qin Haiyang; China	57.69 AS	Nicolò Martinenghi; Italy Arno Kamminga; Netherlands Nic Fink; United States	58.72	None awarded	
200 metre breaststroke	Qin Haiyang; China	2:05.48 WR	Zac Stubblety-Cook; Australia	2:06.40	Matthew Fallon; United States	2:07.74
50 metre butterfly	Thomas Ceccon; Italy	22.68 NR	Diogo Ribeiro; Portugal	22.80 NR	Maxime Grousset; France	22.82
100 metre butterfly	Maxime Grousset; France	50.14 NR	Joshua Liendo; Canada	50.34 NR	Dare Rose; United States	50.46
200 metre butterfly	Léon Marchand; France	1:52.43 NR	Krzysztof Chmielewski; Poland	1:53.62	Tomoru Honda; Japan	1:53.66
200 metre individual medley	Léon Marchand; France	1:54.82 ER	Duncan Scott; Great Britain	1:55.95	Tom Dean; Great Britain	1:56.07
400 metre individual medley	Léon Marchand; France	4:02.50 WR	Carson Foster; United States	4:06.56	Daiya Seto; Japan	4:09.41
4 × 100 metre freestyle relay	Australia; Jack Cartwright (47.84); Flynn Southam (47.85); Kai Taylor (47.91); Kyle Chalmers (46.56); Matthew Temple^{[b]}	3:10.16	Italy; Alessandro Miressi (47.54); Manuel Frigo (47.79); Lorenzo Zazzeri (48.13); Thomas Ceccon (47.03); Leonardo Deplano^{[b]}	3:10.49	United States; Ryan Held (48.16); Jack Alexy (47.56); Chris Guiliano (47.77); Matt King (47.32); Destin Lasco^{[b]} Justin Ress^{[b]}	3:10.81
4 × 200 metre freestyle relay	Great Britain; Duncan Scott (1:45.42); Matthew Richards (1:44.65); James Guy (1:45.17); Tom Dean (1:43.84); Joe Litchfield^{[b]}	6:59.08	United States; Luke Hobson (1:46.00); Carson Foster (1:44.49); Jake Mitchell (1:45.06); Kieran Smith (1:44.47); Drew Kibler^{[b]} Baylor Nelson^{[b]} Henry McFadden^{[b]}	7:00.02	Australia; Kai Taylor (1:45.79); Kyle Chalmers (1:45.19); Alexander Graham (1:45.55); Thomas Neill (1:45.60); Flynn Southam^{[b]} Elijah Winnington^{[b]}	7:02.13
4 × 100 metre medley relay	United States; Ryan Murphy (52.04); Nic Fink (58.03); Dare Rose (50.13); Jack Alexy (47.00); Hunter Armstrong^{[b]} Josh Matheny^{[b]} Thomas Heilman^{[b]} Matt King^{[b]}	3:27.20 CR	China; Xu Jiayu (53.39); Qin Haiyang (57.43); Wang Changhao (51.56); Pan Zhanle (46.62); Yan Zibei^{[b]} Sun Jiajun^{[b]} Wang Haoyu^{[b]}	3:29.00 AS	Australia; Bradley Woodward (53.38); Zac Stubblety-Cook (59.25); Matthew Temple (50.10); Kyle Chalmers (46.89); Samuel Williamson^{[b]} Kai Taylor^{[b]}	3:29.62
AF African record | AM Americas record | AS Asian record | CR Championship record | ER European record | OC Oceania record | WR World record | NR National record

=== Women ===
Event	Gold		Silver		Bronze	
50 metre freestyle	Sarah Sjöström; Sweden	23.62	Shayna Jack; Australia	24.10	Zhang Yufei; China	24.15
100 metre freestyle	Mollie O'Callaghan; Australia	52.16	Siobhán Haughey; Hong Kong	52.49	Marrit Steenbergen; Netherlands	52.71
200 metre freestyle	Mollie O'Callaghan; Australia	1:52.85 WR	Ariarne Titmus; Australia	1:53.01	Summer McIntosh; Canada	1:53.65 WJ, NR
400 metre freestyle	Ariarne Titmus; Australia	3:55.38 WR	Katie Ledecky; United States	3:58.73	Erika Fairweather; New Zealand	3:59.59 NR
800 metre freestyle	Katie Ledecky; United States	8:08.87	Li Bingjie; China	8:13.31 AS	Ariarne Titmus; Australia	8:13.59 =OC
1500 metre freestyle	Katie Ledecky; United States	15:26.27	Simona Quadarella; Italy	15:43.31	Li Bingjie; China	15:45.71
50 metre backstroke	Kaylee McKeown; Australia	27.08 OC	Regan Smith; United States	27.11	Lauren Cox; Great Britain	27.20
100 metre backstroke	Kaylee McKeown; Australia	57.53 CR	Regan Smith; United States	57.78	Katharine Berkoff; United States	58.25
200 metre backstroke	Kaylee McKeown; Australia	2:03.85	Regan Smith; United States	2:04.94	Peng Xuwei; China	2:06.74
50 metre breaststroke	Rūta Meilutytė; Lithuania	29.16 WR	Lilly King; United States	29.94	Benedetta Pilato; Italy	30.04
100 metre breaststroke	Rūta Meilutytė; Lithuania	1:04.62	Tatjana Schoenmaker; South Africa	1:05.84	Lydia Jacoby; United States	1:05.94
200 metre breaststroke	Tatjana Schoenmaker; South Africa	2:20.80	Kate Douglass; United States	2:21.23	Tes Schouten; Netherlands	2:21.63 NR
50 metre butterfly	Sarah Sjöström; Sweden	24.77	Zhang Yufei; China	25.05 AS	Gretchen Walsh; United States	25.46
100 metre butterfly	Zhang Yufei; China	56.12	Maggie Mac Neil; Canada	56.45	Torri Huske; United States	56.61
200 metre butterfly	Summer McIntosh; Canada	2:04.06 AM, WJ	Elizabeth Dekkers; Australia	2:05.46	Regan Smith; United States	2:06.78
200 metre individual medley	Kate Douglass; United States	2:07.17	Alexandra Walsh; United States	2:07.97	Yu Yiting; China	2:08.74
400 metre individual medley	Summer McIntosh; Canada	4:27.11 CR	Katie Grimes; United States	4:31.41	Jenna Forrester; Australia	4:32.30
4 × 100 metre freestyle relay	Australia; Mollie O'Callaghan (52.08); Shayna Jack (51.69); Meg Harris (52.29); Emma McKeon (51.90); Brianna Throssell^{[b]} Madison Wilson^{[b]}	3:27.96 WR	United States; Gretchen Walsh (54.06); Abbey Weitzeil (52.71); Olivia Smoliga (52.88); Kate Douglass (52.28); Torri Huske^{[b]} Maxine Parker^{[b]}	3:31.93	China; Cheng Yujie (53.39); Yang Junxuan (53.53); Wu Qingfeng (52.64); Zhang Yufei (52.84); Ai Yanhan^{[b]} Zhu Menghui^{[b]}	3:32.40 AS
4 × 200 metre freestyle relay	Australia; Mollie O'Callaghan (1:53.66); Shayna Jack (1:55.63); Brianna Throssell (1:55.80); Ariarne Titmus (1:52.41); Madison Wilson^{[b]} Lani Pallister^{[b]} Kiah Melverton^{[b]}	7:37.50 WR	United States; Erin Gemmell (1:55.97); Katie Ledecky (1:54.39); Bella Sims (1:54.64); Alex Shackell (1:56.38); Leah Smith^{[b]} Anna Peplowski^{[b]}	7:41.38	China; Li Bingjie (1:55.83); Li Jiaping (1:58.54); Ai Yanhan (1:55.57); Liu Yaxin (1:55.46); Yang Peiqi^{[b]} Ge Chutong^{[b]}	7:44.40
4 × 100 metre medley relay	United States; Regan Smith (57.68); Lilly King (1:04.93); Gretchen Walsh (57.06); Kate Douglass (52.41); Katharine Berkoff^{[b]} Lydia Jacoby^{[b]} Torri Huske^{[b]} Abbey Weitzeil^{[b]}	3:52.08	Australia; Kaylee McKeown (57.91); Abbey Harkin (1:07.07); Emma McKeon (56.44); Mollie O'Callaghan (51.95); Madison Wilson^{[b]} Brianna Throssell^{[b]} Meg Harris^{[b]}	3:53.37	Canada; Kylie Masse (58.74); Sophie Angus (1:06.21); Maggie Mac Neil (55.69); Summer McIntosh (53.48); Ingrid Wilm^{[b]} Mary-Sophie Harvey^{[b]}	3:54.12
AF African record | AM Americas record | AS Asian record | CR Championship record | ER European record | OC Oceania record | WR World record | NR National record

^{b} Swimmers who participated in the heats only and received medals.

=== Mixed events ===
Event	Gold		Silver		Bronze	
4 × 100 metre freestyle relay	Australia; Jack Cartwright (48.14); Kyle Chalmers (47.25); Shayna Jack (51.73); Mollie O'Callaghan (51.71); Flynn Southam^{[b]} Madison Wilson^{[b]} Meg Harris^{[b]}	3:18.83 WR	United States; Jack Alexy (47.68); Matt King (47.78); Abbey Weitzeil (52.94); Kate Douglass (52.42); Chris Guiliano^{[b]} Olivia Smoliga^{[b]} Bella Sims^{[b]}	3:20.82	Great Britain; Matt Richards (47.83); Duncan Scott (47.46); Anna Hopkin (53.30); Freya Anderson (53.09); Jacob Whittle^{[b]} Tom Dean^{[b]} Lucy Hope^{[b]}	3:21.68 ER
4 × 100 metre medley relay	China; Xu Jiayu (52.42); Qin Haiyang (57.31); Zhang Yufei (55.69); Cheng Yujie (53.15); Yan Zibei^{[b]} Wang Yichun^{[b]} Wu Qingfeng^{[b]}	3:38.57	Australia; Kaylee McKeown (58.03); Zac Stubblety-Cook (58.84); Matthew Temple (50.63); Shayna Jack (51.53); Bradley Woodward^{[b]} Samuel Williamson^{[b]} Emma McKeon^{[b]}	3:39.03	United States; Ryan Murphy (52.02); Nic Fink (58.19); Torri Huske (58.19); Kate Douglass (51.79); Katharine Berkoff^{[b]} Josh Matheny^{[b]} Dare Rose^{[b]} Abbey Weitzeil^{[b]}	3:40.19
AF African record | AM Americas record | AS Asian record | CR Championship record | ER European record | OC Oceania record | WR World record | NR National record

^{b} Swimmers who participated in the heats only and received medals.

== Records ==
The following world and championship records were set during the competition.

=== World records ===
Date	Round	Event	Time	Name	Nation
July 23	Final	Women's 400 metre freestyle	3:55.38	Ariarne Titmus	Australia
July 23	Final	Men's 400 metre individual medley	4:02.50	Léon Marchand	France
July 23	Final	Women's 4 × 100 metre freestyle relay	3:27.96	Mollie O'Callaghan (52.08); Shayna Jack (51.69); Meg Harris (52.29); Emma McKeon (51.90)	Australia
July 26	Final	Women's 200 metre freestyle	1:52.85	Mollie O'Callaghan	Australia
July 27	Final	Women's 4 × 200 metre freestyle relay	7:37.50	Mollie O'Callaghan (1:53.66); Shayna Jack (1:55.63); Brianna Throssell (1:55.80); Ariarne Titmus (1:52.42)	Australia
July 28	Final	Men's 200 metre breaststroke	2:05.48	Qin Haiyang	China
July 29	Semifinal 2	Women's 50 metre freestyle	23.61	Sarah Sjöström	Sweden
July 29	Semifinal 2	Women's 50 metre breaststroke	=29.30	Rūta Meilutytė	Lithuania
July 29	Final	Mixed 4 × 100 metre freestyle relay	3:18.83	Jack Cartwright (48.14); Kyle Chalmers (47.25); Shayna Jack (51.73); Mollie O'Callaghan (51.71)	Australia
July 30	Final	Women's 50 metre breaststroke	29.16	Rūta Meilutytė	Lithuania

=== Championship records ===
Date	Round	Event	Time	Name	Nation
July 25	Final	Women's 100 metre backstroke	57.53	Kaylee McKeown	Australia
July 30	Final	Men's 1500 metre freestyle	14:31.54	Ahmed Hafnaoui	Tunisia
July 30	Final	Women's 400 metre individual medley	4:27.11	Summer McIntosh	Canada
July 30	Final	Men's 4 × 100 metre medley relay	3:27.20	Ryan Murphy (52.04); Nic Fink (58.03); Dare Rose (50.13); Jack Alexy (47.00)	United States
