= Kaylee McKeown =

Australian swimmer (born 2001)

Kaylee McKeown OAM
- With gold at the Paris 2024 Olympic Games

Personal information
- Full name: Kaylee Rochelle McKeown
- Born: 12 July 2001 (age 25) Redcliffe, Queensland, Australia
- Height: 1.75 m (5 ft 9 in)
- Weight: 60 kg (132 lb)

Sport
- Sport: Swimming
- Strokes: Backstroke, individual medley
- Club: Griffith University
- Coach: Michael Bohl
Medal record
Women's swimming
Representing Australia
Event	1st	2nd	3rd
Olympic Games	5	1	3
World Championships (LC)	6	9	0
World Championships (SC)	3	1	1
Commonwealth Games	4	1	1
Total	18	12	5
Olympic Games
Gold medal – first place	2020 Tokyo	100 m backstroke
Gold medal – first place	2020 Tokyo	200 m backstroke
Gold medal – first place	2020 Tokyo	4×100 m medley
Gold medal – first place	2024 Paris	100 m backstroke
Gold medal – first place	2024 Paris	200 m backstroke
Silver medal – second place	2024 Paris	4×100 m medley
Bronze medal – third place	2020 Tokyo	4×100 m mixed medley
Bronze medal – third place	2024 Paris	200 m medley
Bronze medal – third place	2024 Paris	4×100 m mixed medley
World Championships (LC)
Gold medal – first place	2022 Budapest	200 m backstroke
Gold medal – first place	2023 Fukuoka	50 m backstroke
Gold medal – first place	2023 Fukuoka	100 m backstroke
Gold medal – first place	2023 Fukuoka	200 m backstroke
Gold medal – first place	2025 Singapore	100 m backstroke
Gold medal – first place	2025 Singapore	200 m backstroke
Silver medal – second place	2017 Budapest	4×100 m mixed medley
Silver medal – second place	2019 Gwangju	200 m backstroke
Silver medal – second place	2019 Gwangju	4×100 m medley
Silver medal – second place	2022 Budapest	200 m medley
Silver medal – second place	2022 Budapest	4×100 m medley
Silver medal – second place	2022 Budapest	4×100 m mixed medley
Silver medal – second place	2023 Fukuoka	4×100 m medley
Silver medal – second place	2023 Fukuoka	4×100 m mixed medley
Silver medal – second place	2025 Singapore	4×100 m medley
World Championships (SC)
Gold medal – first place	2022 Melbourne	100 m backstroke
Gold medal – first place	2022 Melbourne	200 m backstroke
Gold medal – first place	2022 Melbourne	4×50 m medley
Silver medal – second place	2022 Melbourne	4×100 m medley
Bronze medal – third place	2022 Melbourne	200 m medley
Commonwealth Games
Gold medal – first place	2022 Birmingham	100 m backstroke
Gold medal – first place	2022 Birmingham	200 m backstroke
Gold medal – first place	2022 Birmingham	4×100 m medley
Gold medal – first place	2022 Birmingham	4×100 m mixed medley
Silver medal – second place	2022 Birmingham	200 m medley
Bronze medal – third place	2022 Birmingham	50 m backstroke
Summer Youth Olympics
Gold medal – first place	2018 Buenos Aires	50 m backstroke
Silver medal – second place	2018 Buenos Aires	100 m backstroke
Silver medal – second place	2018 Buenos Aires	4×100 m medley
Bronze medal – third place	2018 Buenos Aires	200 m backstroke
Junior Pan Pacific Championships
Gold medal – first place	2016 Maui	200 m backstroke
Bronze medal – third place	2016 Maui	100 m backstroke

Kaylee Rochelle McKeown OAM (/məˈkjuːən/ mə-KEW-ən; born 12 July 2001) is an Australian swimmer and multiple Olympic gold medalist. She is widely considered the greatest backstroker of all time, holding a record 10 individual backstroke titles across the Olympic Games and World Aquatics Championships. She is the reigning Olympic champion in the 100 and 200 metres backstroke. She is the world record holder in the long course and short course 200 metre backstroke, and is the former world record holder in the long course 50 metre backstroke and both the long course and short course 100 metre backstroke. She won gold in both the 100 metre and 200 metre backstroke at both the 2020 and 2024 Olympics. In 2023, she was named as the "Best Female Swimmer of the Year" by World Aquatics, after sweeping gold in all three events of backstroke (50m, 100m, and 200m) at all three World Cup legs, held in Berlin, Athens and Budapest in October, 2023.

== Background ==
Kaylee McKeown was 15 years old when she joined her older sister Taylor on the Australian Dolphins swim team. She was one of the youngest members. She currently trains with the Griffith University swim group with Michael Bohl as her coach.

== Career ==
=== 2016–2019 ===
When she was 15 years old, McKeown competed at the Junior Pan Pacific Championships, held in August in Maui, Hawaii, United States, winning the gold medal in the 200 metre backstroke with a time of 2:10.01 and the bronze medal in the 100 metre backstroke with a time of 1:01.01.

In July 2017, McKeown competed at the World Championships in Budapest. She swam in the heats of the mixed 4 × 100 m medley relay and was replaced by Mitch Larkin in the final; Australia eventually won the silver medal. McKeown then competed in the 200 m backstroke, finishing fourth in a world junior record time of 2:06.76.

In April 2018, McKeown competed at the Commonwealth Games on the Gold Coast. In the 100 m backstroke, she finished fourth in a time of 1:00.08. She then finished fourth in the 200 m backstroke, recording a time of 2:07.86.

In August 2018, McKeown competed at the Pan Pacific Championships in Tokyo. In the 100 m backstroke, she finished fifth in a time of 59.25. In the 200 m backstroke, she finished fourth in a time of 2:07.01.

In July 2019, McKeown competed at the World Championships in Gwangju. In the 100 m backstroke, she finished fifth in a personal best time of 59.10. In the 200 m backstroke, she won the silver medal in a time of 2:06.26. She then swam the heats of the women's 4 × 100 m medley relay; Australia eventually won the silver medal.

=== 2020 ===
In January 2020, McKeown competed at the South Australian Championships in Adelaide. She won the 100 m backstroke in a time of 58.52, which was a personal best and a new Australian Allcomers record. She then swam in the 200 m backstroke, winning in a time of 2:05.83 to set a new personal best and Australian Allcomers record in that event.

In November 2020, McKeown competed at the Medal Shots Long Course Preparation Meet in Brisbane. She went 58.11 in the 100 m backstroke, breaking the Australian record of 58.23 set by Emily Seebohm in 2012. McKeown then competed in the 200 m backstroke, recording a time of 2:04.49 to break Seebohm's Australian record of 2:05.68 from 2017.

At the end of November, Mckeown competed at the Australian Short Course Championships. She went 1:58.94 in the 200 m backstroke, breaking the world record of 1:59.23 set by Hungary's Katinka Hosszú in 2014. McKeown set an Australian record of 2:03.68 in the 200 m individual medley.

In December 2020, McKeown returned to the long course format and competed at the Queensland Championships in Brisbane. She went 57.93 in the 100 m backstroke to lower her own Australian record. She then competed in the 200 m individual medley, recording a personal best and Australian Allcomers record time of 2:08.23.

=== 2021 ===
In May 2021, McKeown competed at the Sydney Open. She went 57.63 in the 100 m backstroke to lower her own Australian record; her time was 0.06 slower than the world record set by the US' Regan Smith in 2019. McKeown then went 2:04.31 in the 200 m backstroke to break her own Australian record. She then swam the 50 m backstroke, recording a time of 27.16 to break Seebohm's Australian record of 27.37 from 2017.

In June 2021, McKeown competed at the Australian Trials in Adelaide. She won the 100 m backstroke in a time of 57.45, breaking Smith's world record. She then won the 200 m individual medley, recording a personal time of 2:08.19, which was the fastest time of the year. Her final event was the 200 m backstroke, which she won in a time of 2:04.28, another Australian record. She qualified for the Olympic team in all three events, but later withdrew from the 200 m individual medley.

In July–August 2021, McKeown competed at the Olympics in Tokyo. Her first event was the 100 m backstroke. She went 57.88 in the heats, breaking the Olympic record of 57.96 set by Smith in the previous heat. Smith reclaimed the record in the semifinals, however, posting a time of 57.86. In the final, McKeown won the gold medal in an Olympic record time of 57.47. Her next event was the 200 m backstroke, which she won in a time of 2:04.68. Later in the session, she swam in the mixed 4 × 100 m medley relay, an event which made its Olympic debut that year. She split 58.14 on the backstroke leg, helping Australia win the bronze medal in an overall time of 3:38.95. On the final day of competition, McKeown swam the backstroke leg of the women's 4 × 100 m medley relay. She split 58.01. Australia won the gold medal in a time of 3:51.60, breaking the Olympic record of 3:52.05 set by the US in 2012, and the national record of 3:52.58 from 2009.

Chris Mooney moved programs, prompting McKeown to move to Michael Bohl at Griffith University.

=== 2022 ===
In June 2022, McKeown competed at the World Championships in Budapest. She did not swim the 100 m backstroke, choosing instead to prioritise the 200 m individual medley, in which she eventually won the silver medal in a time of 2:08.57. She then competed in the mixed 4 × 100 m medley relay, splitting 58.66 on the backstroke leg; Australia won the silver medal in a time of 3:41.34. McKeown won the gold medal in the 200 m backstroke in a time of 2:05.08. Her final event was the women's 4 × 100 m medley relay. She split 58.77 on the backstroke leg; Australia won the silver medal in a time of 3:54.25.

In July–August 2022, McKeown competed at the Commonwealth Games in Birmingham. Her first event was the 100 m backstroke, which she won in a time of 58.60, breaking the games record of 58.63 set by Canada's Kylie Masse in 2018. The following day, McKeown won the 200 m backstroke, winning in a time of 2:05.60 to break the games record of 2:05.98, which was also set by Masse in 2018. She then swam in the 200 m individual medley, winning the silver medal in a time of 2:09.52. The following day, she competed in the mixed 4 × 100 m medley relay. In the final, she split 59.01 on the backstroke leg; Australia won the gold medal in a time of 3:41.30, which broke the games record of 3:45.34 established by Australia in the heats. On the final day, McKeown competed in the women's 4 × 100 m medley relay, splitting 58.79 on the backstroke leg; Australia won the gold medal in a time of 3:54.44.

In December 2022, McKeown competed at the World Championships (25 m) in Melbourne. She won the bronze medal in an Australian record time of 2:03.57. The following day, she swam in the 100 m backstroke, winning the gold medal in a time of 55.49. She then swam in the heats of the women's 4 × 50 m medley relay; Australia eventually won the gold medal. On the final day, McKeown won the 200 m backstroke in a time of 1:59.26. She then swam the backstroke leg of the 4 × 100 m medley relay, splitting 55.74; Australia won the silver medal in a time of 3:44.92, breaking the national record of 3:47.91 from 2019.

=== 2023 ===
In March 2023, McKeown competed at the New South Wales Championships in Sydney. She went 2:03.14 in the 200 m backstroke, breaking the world record of 2:03.35 set by Smith in 2019. In doing so, McKeown became the second swimmer to hold the Olympic title, Commonwealth title, Long Course World Championship title, Short Course World Championship title, Long Course world record and Short Course world record in the same event concurrently, following compatriot Grant Hackett in the 1500 m freestyle.

In July 2023, McKeown competed at the World Championships in Fukuoka. In the semifinals of the 200 m individual medley, she was disqualified for her execution of the backstroke to breaststroke turn, where she was ruled to have been too far on her front. Her next event was the 100 m backstroke, which she won in a time of 57.53, breaking Smith's championship record of 57.57 from 2019. She then swam in the mixed 4 × 100 m medley relay, splitting 58.03 on the backstroke leg; Australia won the silver medal in a time of 3:39.03. McKeown then competed in the 50 m backstroke, winning the gold medal in an Australian record time of 27.08. Her next event was the 200 m backstroke, in which she won the gold medal in a time of 2:03.85. She became the first female swimmer to sweep a single stroke at the world championships. Her final event was the women's 4 × 100 m medley relay. She split 57.91 on the backstroke leg; Australia won the silver medal in a time of 3:53.37.

In October 2023, McKeown competed at the World Cup. In Athens, she went 27.02 in the 50 m backstroke to set a new Australian record. The following week, she competed in Budapest. She went 26.86, breaking the world record of 26.98 set by China's Liu Xiang in 2018. In doing so, McKeown became the first swimmer to hold all 3 backstroke world records (long course). She then competed in the 100 m backstroke, setting a new world record of 57.33; it stood until June 2024.

=== 2024 ===
In April 2024, McKeown competed at the Australian Championships on the Gold Coast. In the 200 m individual medley, she went 2:06.99, breaking the Australian record of 2:07.03, set by Stephanie Rice in 2009. McKeown then went 4:28.22 in the 400 m individual medley, breaking the Australian record of 4:29.45 from 2008, which was also held by Rice.

In June 2024, McKeown competed at the Australian Trials in Brisbane. She went 2:06.63 in the 200 m individual medley to break her own Australian record.

In July–August 2024, McKeown competed at the Olympics in Paris. She swam in the 100 m backstroke, winning in a time of 57.33, tying her Australian record and breaking her Olympic record. She then swam in the 200 m backstroke, winning in a time of 2:03.73 to break the Olympic record of 2:04.06 set by the US' Missy Franklin in 2012. The following day, she swam in the 200 m individual medley, recording a time of 2:08.08 to initially finish fourth, behind the US' Alex Walsh. However, Walsh was later disqualified for executing an backstroke to breaststroke turn, promoting McKeown to the bronze medal. She then competed in the mixed 4 × 100 m medley relay, splitting 57.90 on the backstroke leg; Australia won the bronze medal in an Oceanian record time of 3:38.76. McKeown's final event was the women's 4 × 100 m medley relay. On the backstroke leg, she split 57.72, finishing behind Smith who broke the Olympic record. Australia won the silver medal in a final time of 3:53.11.

In September 2024, McKeown competed at the Australian Short Course Championships in Adelaide. She went 54.56 in the 100 m backstroke, breaking the world record of 54.89 set by compatriot Minna Atherton in 2019. McKeown went 25.40 in the 50 m backstroke, breaking the Oceanian record of 25.49, set by O'Callaghan in 2022. She qualified for the World Championships in Budapest.

In October 2024, McKeown competed at the World Cup. In Shanghai, she went 25.36 in the 50 m backstroke to set another Australian record. She subsequently withdrew from the remainder of the world cup, and from the World Championships.

=== 2025–2026 ===
McKeown started training with Melanie Marshall, who had succeeded Bohl as head coach at Griffith University. However, in April 2025, McKeown returned to USC Spartans to swim for Michael Sage.

In July 2025, McKeown competed at the World Championships in Singapore. In the 100 m backstroke, she won the gold medal in a Australian and championship record time of 57.16. She then swam in the mixed 4 × 100 m medley relay, splitting 57.65 on the backstroke leg; Australia finished fifth in a time of 3:41.02. In the 200 m backstroke, McKeown won the gold medal in a time of 2:03.33, which broke Smith's championship record of 2:03.35 from 2019. Her final event was the women's 4 × 100 m medley relay. She split 57.69 on the backstroke leg; Australia won the silver medal in a time of 3:52.67.

In October 2025, McKeown competed in the World Cup. In Carmel, she went 1:58.86 in the 200 m backstroke to set a new Australian record. The following week, she competed at the Westmont stop, recording a time of 1:57.87 to break Smith's world of 1:58.04 from 2024. The following week, McKeown competed in Toronto. She went 25.35 in the 50 m backstroke to set a new Australian record. She then went 54.49 in the 100 m backstroke to set a new Australian record. Her final event was the 200 m backstroke, where she lowered the world record to 1:57.33.

McKeown qualified for the Commonwealth Games and the Pan Pacific Championships, but later withdrew due to glandular fever.

== Results in major championships ==
Meet	50 back	100 back	200 back	200 medley	400 medley	4×50 medley	4×100 medley	4×100 mixed medley
PACJ 2016	—N/a	3rd place, bronze medalist(s)	1st place, gold medalist(s)	17th		—N/a		—N/a
WC 2017			4th		16th	—N/a		2nd place, silver medalist(s)
CG 2018		4th	4th		9th	—N/a		—N/a
PAC 2018	—N/a	5th	5th			—N/a		
YOG 2018	1st place, gold medalist(s)	2nd place, silver medalist(s)	3rd place, bronze medalist(s)	7th	—N/a		2nd place, silver medalist(s)	9th
WC 2019	4th	5th	2nd place, silver medalist(s)			—N/a	2nd place, silver medalist(s)	
OG 2020	—N/a	1st place, gold medalist(s)	1st place, gold medalist(s)			—N/a	1st place, gold medalist(s)	3rd place, bronze medalist(s)
WC 2022	5th	DNS	1st place, gold medalist(s)	2nd place, silver medalist(s)		—N/a	2nd place, silver medalist(s)	2nd place, silver medalist(s)
CG 2022	3rd place, bronze medalist(s)	1st place, gold medalist(s)	1st place, gold medalist(s)	2nd place, silver medalist(s)		—N/a	1st place, gold medalist(s)	1st place, gold medalist(s)
SCW 2022	9th	1st place, gold medalist(s)	1st place, gold medalist(s)	3rd place, bronze medalist(s)		(gold) ^{[a]}	2nd place, silver medalist(s)	—N/a
WC 2023	1st place, gold medalist(s)	1st place, gold medalist(s)	1st place, gold medalist(s)	DQ		—N/a	2nd place, silver medalist(s)	2nd place, silver medalist(s)
OG 2024	—N/a	1st place, gold medalist(s)	1st place, gold medalist(s)	3rd place, bronze medalist(s)		—N/a	2nd place, silver medalist(s)	3rd place, bronze medalist(s)
WC 2025	DNS	1st place, gold medalist(s)	1st place, gold medalist(s)			—N/a	2nd place, silver medalist(s)	5th

^{a} McKeown swam only in the preliminary heats.

== Career best times ==
=== Long course metres (50 m pool) ===
As of 4 October 2025

Event	Time	Meet	Location	Date	Notes
50 m freestyle	26.59	Queensland Championships	Brisbane	14 December 2020	
50 m freestyle	26.59	NSW Open Championships	Sydney	18 March 2021	
100 m freestyle	54.29	NSW Open Championships	Sydney	18 March 2021	
200 m freestyle	1:56.14	Queensland Championships	Brisbane	10 December 2023	
400 m freestyle	4:06.85	Victorian Open Championships	Melbourne	24 February 2024	
50 m backstroke	26.86	World Cup	Budapest	20 October 2023	
100 m backstroke	57.16	World Championships	Singapore	29 July 2025	CR, OC
200 m backstroke	2:03.14	NSW Open Championships	Sydney	10 March 2023	WR, ACR
50 m breaststroke	32.18	Queensland Championships	Brisbane	14 December 2020	
100 m breaststroke	1:06.86	Victorian Open Championships	Melbourne	17 February 2023	
200 m breaststroke	2:24.18	Australian Championships	Gold Coast	19 April 2023	
50 m butterfly	27.28	Medal Shots Preparation Meet	Brisbane	15 November 2020	
100 m butterfly	59.45	Southport Prep Meet	Gold Coast	18 November 2023	
200 m individual medley	2:06.63	Australian Trials	Brisbane	10 June 2024	OC, ACR
400 m individual medley	4:28.22	Australian Championships	Gold Coast	18 April 2024	OC, ACR

=== Short course metres (25 m pool) ===
As of 19 October 2025

Event	Time	Meet	Location	Date	Notes
200 m freestyle	1:55.84	Australian Championships	Melbourne	27 October 2018	
50 m backstroke	25.35	World Cup	Toronto	23 October 2025	OC
100 m backstroke	54.49	World Cup	Toronto	24 October 2025	CR, OC
200 m backstroke	1:57.33	World Cup	Toronto	25 October 2025	WR
100 m breaststroke	1:08.06	Australian Championships	Melbourne	25 October 2018	
50 m butterfly	27.46	Australian Championships	Brisbane	27 November 2020	
100 m individual medley	57.76	World Cup	Shanghai	18 October 2024	
200 m individual medley	2:03.57	World Championships	Melbourne	13 December 2022	OC

Legend: WR – World record; OC – Oceanian record; CR – Commonwealth record; NR – Australian record; e – equalled existing record; ACR – Australian All Comers record;
Records not set in finals: h – heat; sf – semifinal; r – relay 1st leg; rh – relay heat 1st leg; b – B final; † – en route to final mark; so – swim-off; tt – time trial

== World records ==
=== Long course metres ===
No.	Event	Time	Meet	Location	Date	Status	Ref
1	100 m backstroke	57.45	2021 Australian Swimming Trials	Adelaide, Australia	13 June 2021	Former	
2	200 m backstroke	2:03.14	2023 NSW State Open Championships	Sydney, Australia	10 March 2023	Current	
3	50 m backstroke	26.86	2023 World Aquatics Swimming World Cup	Budapest, Hungary	20 October 2023	Former	
4	100 m backstroke (2)	57.33	2023 World Aquatics Swimming World Cup	Budapest, Hungary	21 October 2023	Former	

=== Short course metres ===
No.	Event	Time	Meet	Location	Date	Status	Ref
1	200 m backstroke	1:58.94	Australian Swimming Championships (25m)	Brisbane, Australia	28 November 2020	Former	
2	100 m backstroke	54.46	Australian Swimming Championships (25m)	Adelaide, Australia	26 September 2024	Former	
3	200 m backstroke	1:57.87	2025 World Aquatics Swimming World Cup	Westmont, United States	19 October 2025	Former	
4	200 m backstroke	1:57.33	2025 World Aquatics Swimming World Cup	Toronto, Canada	25 October 2025	Current	

== Olympic records ==
=== Long course metres ===
No.	Event	Time		Meet	Location	Date	Status	Notes	Ref
1	100 m backstroke	57.88	h	2020 Summer Olympics	Tokyo, Japan	25 July 2021	Former		
2	100 m backstroke (2)	57.47		2020 Summer Olympics	Tokyo, Japan	27 July 2021	Former		
3	4x100 m medley relay^{[a]}	3:51.60		2020 Summer Olympics	Tokyo, Japan	1 August 2021	Former	CR	
4	100 m backstroke (3)	57.33		2024 Summer Olympics	Paris, France	30 July 2024	Former		
5	200 m backstroke	2:03.73		2024 Summer Olympics	Paris, France	2 August 2024	Current		

Legend: WR – World record; OC – Oceanian record; NR – Australian record; e – equalled existing record;
Records not set in finals: h – heat; sf – semifinal; r – relay 1st leg; rh – relay heat 1st leg; b – B final; † – en route to final mark; so – swim-off; tt – time trial

^{a} split 58.01 for backstroke leg; with Chelsea Hodges (breaststroke), Emma McKeon (butterfly), Cate Campbell (freestyle)

== Awards and honours ==
- Medal of the Order of Australia: 2022
- Australian Institute of Sport Performance Awards Female Able-Athlete of the Year: 2023
- World Aquatics Female Athlete of the Year: 2023
- Swimming World Female Swimmer of the Year 2023
- SwimSwam Female Swimmer of the Year: 2020 & 2023
- Swimming Australia Olympic Program Swimmer of the Year: 2024 & 2025

== Personal life ==
In August 2020, McKeown's father, Sholto, died after a two-year battle with brain cancer. She has a tattoo on her foot in his memory that says, "I'll always be with you".

== See also ==
- List of Youth Olympic Games gold medalists who won Olympic gold medals

Sporting positions
Preceded by (United States) Beata Nelson	FINA Swimming World Cup; Overall female winner 2023	Succeeded by (United States) Kate Douglass
Records
Preceded by (China) Liu Xiang	Women's 50-metre backstroke world record-holder (long course); 20 October 2023 – 12 August 2026	Succeeded by (Italy) Sara Curtis
Preceded by (United States) Regan Smith	Women's 100-metre backstroke world record-holder (long course); 13 June 2021 – 18 June 2024	Succeeded by (United States) Regan Smith
Preceded by (United States) Regan Smith	Women's 200-metre backstroke world record-holder (long course); 10 March 2023 – present	Incumbent
Preceded by (Australia) Minna Atherton	Women's 100-metre backstroke world record-holder (short course); 26 September 2024 – 25 October 2024	Succeeded by (United States) Regan Smith
Preceded by (Hungary) Katinka Hosszú (United States) Regan Smith	Women's 200-metre backstroke world record-holder (short course); 28 November 2020 – 2 November 2024; 19 October 2025 –	Succeeded by (United States) Regan Smith; Incumbent
