= 2024 World Aquatics Swimming Championships (25 m) – Women's 50 metre backstroke =

Swimming competition

Women's 50 metre backstroke at the 2024 World Aquatics Swimming Championships (25 m)
- Venue: Duna Arena
- Location: Budapest, Hungary
- Dates: 12 December (heats and semifinals); 13 December (final)
- Competitors: 57 from 53 nations
- Winning time: 25.23 WR

Medalists
gold medal	Regan Smith	United States
silver medal	Katharine Berkoff	United States
bronze medal	Kylie Masse	Canada

The women's 50 metre backstroke event at the 2024 World Aquatics Swimming Championships (25 m) was held from 12 to 13 December 2024 at the Duna Arena in Budapest, Hungary.

== Records ==
Prior to the competition, the existing world and championship records were as follows.

World record	Maggie Mac Neil (CAN)	25.25	Melbourne, Australia	16 December 2022
Competition record	Maggie Mac Neil (CAN)	25.25	Melbourne, Australia	16 December 2022

The following record was established during the competition:

Date	Event	Name	Nationality	Time	Record
13 December	Final	Regan Smith	United States	25.23	WR

== Results ==
=== Heats ===
The heats were started on 12 December at 9:02.

Rank	Heat	Lane	Name	Nationality	Time	Notes
1	5	1	Katharine Berkoff	United States	25.89	Q
2	6	5	Ingrid Wilm	Canada	26.06	Q
3	6	4	Regan Smith	United States	26.08	Q
4	6	1	Kylie Masse	Canada	26.11	Q
5	5	3	Maaike de Waard	Netherlands	26.19	Q
6	4	5	Analia Pigrée	France	26.22	Q
7	6	3	Mizuki Hirai	Japan	26.23	Q
8	5	5	Sara Curtis	Italy	26.35	Q
9	6	6	Lora Komoróczy	Hungary	26.38	Q
10	5	4	Kira Toussaint	Netherlands	26.48	Q
11	4	4	Iona Anderson	Australia	26.56	Q
12	6	9	Hanna Rosvall	Sweden	26.62	Q
13	4	3	Danielle Hill	Ireland	26.67	Q
14	4	6	Anastasiya Shkurdai	Neutral Athletes A	26.68	Q
15	5	0	Fanny Teijonsalo	Finland	26.74	Q
16	6	2	Daryna Nabojčenko	Czech Republic	26.86	Q
17	5	7	Kalia Antoniou	Cyprus	26.87	R, NR
18	5	8	Pauline Mahieu	France	26.88	R
19	3	7	Miranda Grana	Neutral Athletes C	26.96	NR
20	6	7	Savannah-Eve Martin	New Zealand	26.98	
21	5	2	Jessica Thompson	South Africa	27.10	
22	5	9	Carmen Weiler	Spain	27.13	
23	6	8	Theodora Drakou	Greece	27.14	NR
24	6	0	Kim Seung-won	South Korea	27.17	
25	5	6	Lu Xingchen	China	27.20	
26	4	8	Adela Piskorska	Poland	27.24	
27	4	2	Elizaveta Agapitova	Neutral Athletes B	27.39	
28	3	5	Justine Murdock	Lithuania	27.52	
29	2	4	Abril Aunchayna	Uruguay	27.57	
30	3	8	Masniari Wolf	Indonesia	27.70	
31	3	4	Xeniya Ignatova	Kazakhstan	27.75	
32	3	1	Zuri Ferguson	Trinidad and Tobago	27.83	NR
33	4	9	Nika Sharafutdinova	Ukraine	27.91	
34	4	1	Cindy Cheung	Hong Kong	28.23	
35	3	3	Liao Yu-fei	Chinese Taipei	28.27	
36	3	2	Saovanee Boonamphai	Thailand	28.28	
37	3	9	Elizabeth Jiménez	Dominican Republic	28.44	
38	2	5	Jessica Humphrey	Namibia	28.52	NR
39	3	0	Wilina Jules-Marthe	Cape Verde	28.92	
40	4	0	Mariangela Boitšuk	Estonia	29.02	
41	2	3	Leanna Wainwright	Jamaica	29.54	
42	2	6	Lara Giménez	Paraguay	29.60	NR
43	2	2	Nubia Adjei	Ghana	29.87	
44	1	6	Jovana Kuljača	Montenegro	30.10	
45	2	8	Aaliyah Palestrini	Seychelles	30.45	
46	2	7	Chanchakriya Kheun	Cambodia	30.59	
47	1	7	Timipame-Ere Akiayefa	Nigeria	30.64	
48	2	0	Carolann Faeamani	Tonga	31.13	
49	2	1	Ganga Senavirathne	Sri Lanka	31.72	
50	1	2	Juthi Akter	Bangladesh	31.94	NR
51	1	8	Lina Goyayi	Tanzania	34.25	
52	2	9	Ammara Pinto	Malawi	34.28	
53	1	4	Meher Maqbool	Pakistan	35.08	
54	1	1	Aragsan Mugabo	Rwanda	35.65	
55	1	5	Grace Manuela Nguelo'o	Cameroon	36.50	
56	1	3	Kamila Ibrahim	Comoros	37.91	
	3	6	Teresa Ivan	Slovakia	Disqualified	
	4	7	Janja Šegel	Slovenia	Did not start	

=== Semifinals ===
The semifinals were started on 12 December at 17:48.

Rank	Heat	Lane	Name	Nationality	Time	Notes
1	2	4	Katharine Berkoff	United States	25.51	Q
2	2	5	Regan Smith	United States	25.66	Q
3	1	4	Ingrid Wilm	Canada	25.81	Q
4	1	5	Kylie Masse	Canada	25.98	Q
5	1	6	Sara Curtis	Italy	26.03	Q, WJ, NR
6	2	3	Maaike de Waard	Netherlands	26.14	Q
7	1	3	Analia Pigrée	France	26.22	Q
8	2	7	Iona Anderson	Australia	26.25	Q
9	2	6	Mizuki Hirai	Japan	26.26	R
10	2	2	Lora Komoróczy	Hungary	26.27	R
11	2	1	Danielle Hill	Ireland	26.34	
12	1	2	Kira Toussaint	Netherlands	26.35	
12	1	7	Hanna Rosvall	Sweden	26.35	
14	1	1	Anastasiya Shkurdai	Neutral Athletes A	26.48	
15	1	8	Daryna Nabojčenko	Czech Republic	26.67	
16	2	8	Fanny Teijonsalo	Finland	26.72	

=== Final ===
The final was held on 13 December at 18:04.

Rank	Lane	Name	Nationality	Time	Notes
1st place, gold medalist(s)	5	Regan Smith	United States	25.23	WR
2nd place, silver medalist(s)	4	Katharine Berkoff	United States	25.61	
3rd place, bronze medalist(s)	6	Kylie Masse	Canada	25.78	
4	3	Ingrid Wilm	Canada	25.88	
5	1	Analia Pigrée	France	25.94	NR
6	2	Sara Curtis	Italy	26.26	
7	7	Maaike de Waard	Netherlands	26.28	
8	8	Iona Anderson	Australia	26.31	
