= 2018 Pan Pacific Swimming Championships – Women's 200 metre backstroke =

Women's 200 metre backstroke at the 2018 Pan Pacific Swimming Championships
- Venue: Tokyo Tatsumi International Swimming Center
- Dates: 12 August (heats & finals)
- Competitors: 21 from 9 nations
- Winning time: 2:06.14

Medalists
gold medal	Kathleen Baker	United States
silver medal	Taylor Ruck	Canada
bronze medal	Regan Smith	United States

The women's 200 metre backstroke competition at the 2018 Pan Pacific Swimming Championships took place on August 12 at the Tokyo Tatsumi International Swimming Center. The defending champion was Belinda Hocking of Australia.

== Records ==
Prior to this competition, the existing world and Pan Pacific records were as follows:

World record	Missy Franklin (USA)	2:04.06	London, United Kingdom	3 August 2012
Pan Pacific Championships record	Elizabeth Pelton (USA)	2:07.48	Irvine, United States	20 August 2010

== Results ==
All times are in minutes and seconds.

KEY:	QA	Qualified A Final	QB	Qualified B Final	CR	Championships record	NR	National record	PB	Personal best	SB	Seasonal best

=== Heats ===
The first round was held on 12 August from 10:00.

Only two swimmers from each country may advance to the A or B final. If a country not qualify any swimmer to the A final, that same country may qualify up to three swimmers to the B final.

Rank	Name	Nationality	Time	Notes
1	Regan Smith	United States	2:07.86	QA
2	Taylor Ruck	Canada	2:08.37	QA
3	Kathleen Baker	United States	2:08.38	QA
4	Kylie Masse	Canada	2:08.45	QA
5	Emily Seebohm	Australia	2:09.26	QA
6	Kaylee McKeown	Australia	2:09.27	QA
6	Olivia Smoliga	United States	2:09.27	QB
8	Natsumi Sakai	Japan	2:09.48	QA
9	Hali Flickinger	United States	2:09.63	QB
10	Alex Galyer	New Zealand	2:10.11	QA
11	Anna Konishi	Japan	2:10.24	QB
12	Mabel Zavaros	Canada	2:12.20	QB
13	Kennedy Goss	Canada	2:12.65	QB
14	Rio Shirai	Japan	2:13.05	QB
15	Mikkayla Sheridan	Australia	2:13.33	QB
16	Erika Seltenreich-Hodgson	Canada	2:14.44	
17	Yang Yifan	China	2:14.59	QB
18	Chloe Isleta	Philippines	2:19.53	
19	McKenna DeBever	Peru	2:22.38	
20	Gianna Garcia	Philippines	2:32.16	
21	Osisang Chilton	Palau	2:46.76	

=== B Final ===
The B final was held on 12 August from 17:30.

Rank	Name	Nationality	Time	Notes
9	Hali Flickinger	United States	2:09.22	
10	Anna Konishi	Japan	2:09.44	
11	Olivia Smoliga	United States	2:09.67	
12	Mikkayla Sheridan	Australia	2:10.59	
13	Rio Shirai	Japan	2:11.91	
14	Kennedy Goss	Canada	2:12.17	
15	Mabel Zavaros	Canada	2:12.18	
16	Yang Yifan	China	2:13.50	

=== A Final ===
The A final was held on 12 August from 17:30.

Rank	Name	Nationality	Time	Notes
1st place, gold medalist(s)	Kathleen Baker	United States	2:06.14	CR
2nd place, silver medalist(s)	Taylor Ruck	Canada	2:06.41	
3rd place, bronze medalist(s)	Regan Smith	United States	2:06.46	
4	Kylie Masse	Canada	2:07.00	
5	Kaylee McKeown	Australia	2:07.01	
6	Emily Seebohm	Australia	2:07.12	
7	Natsumi Sakai	Japan	2:08.18	
8	Alex Galyer	New Zealand	2:10.26	
