= 2024 World Aquatics Swimming Championships (25 m) – Women's 200 metre backstroke =

Swimming competition

Women's 200 metre backstroke at the 2024 World Aquatics Swimming Championships (25 m)
- Venue: Duna Arena
- Location: Budapest, Hungary
- Dates: 15 December (heats and final)
- Competitors: 42 from 38 nations
- Winning time: 1:58.04 WR

Medalists
gold medal	Regan Smith	United States
silver medal	Summer McIntosh	Canada
bronze medal	Anastasiya Shkurdai

The women's 200 metre backstroke event at the 2024 World Aquatics Swimming Championships (25 m) was held on 15 December 2024 at the Duna Arena in Budapest, Hungary.

== Records ==
Prior to the competition, the existing world and championship records were as follows.

World record	Regan Smith (USA)	1:58.83	Singapore, Singapore	2 November 2024
Competition record	Katinka Hosszú (HUN)	1:59.23	Doha, Qatar	5 December 2014

The following record was established during the competition:

Date	Event	Name	Nationality	Time	Record
15 December	Final	Regan Smith	United States	1:58.04	WR

== Results ==
=== Heats ===
The heats was held on 15 December at 09:46.

Rank	Heat	Lane	Name	Nationality	Time	Notes
1	3	2	Summer McIntosh	Canada	2:01.52	Q
2	4	4	Anastasiya Shkurdai	Neutral Athletes A	2:01.78	Q
3	5	1	Carmen Weiler	Spain	2:02.16	Q, NR
4	3	6	Phoebe Bacon	United States	2:02.36	Q
5	5	4	Regan Smith	United States	2:02.42	Q
6	5	5	Pauline Mahieu	France	2:03.26	Q
7	3	4	Iona Anderson	Australia	2:03.57	Q
8	4	6	Milana Stepanova	Neutral Athletes B	2:04.62	Q
9	3	5	Gabriela Georgieva	Bulgaria	2:04.63	R
10	5	8	Dóra Molnár	Hungary	2:04.88	R
11	5	3	Aimi Nagaoka	Japan	2:04.91	
12	3	0	Adela Piskorska	Poland	2:05.19	
13	3	9	Lottie Cullen	Ireland	2:05.57	
14	4	5	Bella Grant	Australia	2:05.65	
15	4	3	Aissia Prisecariu	Romania	2:05.81	
16	4	8	Regan Rathwell	Canada	2:05.92	
17	5	2	Giulia D'Innocenzo	Italy	2:06.13	
18	5	6	Zhang Jingyan	China	2:06.37	
19	4	1	Eszter Szabó-Feltóthy	Hungary	2:06.69	
20	4	2	Emma Godwin	New Zealand	2:06.96	
21	3	1	Xeniya Ignatova	Kazakhstan	2:07.00	
22	5	7	Iris Julia Berger	Austria	2:07.05	
23	3	8	Kristen Romano	Puerto Rico	2:07.60	NR
24	4	7	Hannah Pearse	South Africa	2:08.41	
25	4	9	Justine Murdock	Lithuania	2:08.86	
26	5	0	Xiandi Chua	Philippines	2:09.43	
27	3	7	Cindy Cheung	Hong Kong	2:09.49	
28	2	5	Zuri Ferguson	Trinidad and Tobago	2:10.62	NR
29	4	0	Alexia Sotomayor	Peru	2:12.40	
30	2	7	Laurent Estrada	Cuba	2:12.78	
31	2	8	Danielle Titus	Barbados	2:12.86	NR
32	2	6	Anishta Teeluck	Mauritius	2:14.13	
33	2	2	Elisabeth Erlendsdóttir	Faroe Islands	2:14.24	
34	5	9	Nika Sharafutdinova	Ukraine	2:14.86	
35	2	9	Melissa Diego	Guatemala	2:15.02	NR
36	2	1	Taline Mourad	Lebanon	2:16.30	NR
37	2	4	Natalia Zaiteva	Moldova	2:16.73	
38	2	3	Ariuntamir Enkh-Amgalan	Mongolia	2:20.37	
39	2	0	Wong Un Iao	Macau	2:23.68	
40	1	5	Marseleima Moss	Fiji	2:24.22	NR
41	1	4	Idealy Tendrinavalona	Madagascar	2:26.25	
42	1	3	Piper Raho	Northern Mariana Islands	2:34.78	
	3	3	Qian Xinan	China	Did not start	

=== Final ===
The final was held on 15 December at 18:02.

Rank	Lane	Name	Nationality	Time	Notes
1st place, gold medalist(s)	2	Regan Smith	United States	1:58.04	WR
2nd place, silver medalist(s)	4	Summer McIntosh	Canada	1:59.96	WJ
3rd place, bronze medalist(s)	5	Anastasiya Shkurdai	Neutral Athletes A	2:00.56	
4	6	Phoebe Bacon	United States	2:00.76	
5	3	Carmen Weiler	Spain	2:02.26	
6	7	Pauline Mahieu	France	2:03.21	
7	1	Iona Anderson	Australia	2:04.60	
8	8	Milana Stepanova	Neutral Athletes B	2:05.06	
