= Kylie Masse =

Canadian swimmer (born 1996)

Kylie Masse OLY
- Masse in 2026

Personal information
- Full name: Kylie Jacqueline Masse
- National team: Canada
- Born: January 18, 1996 (age 30) Windsor, Ontario, Canada
- Height: 172 cm (5 ft 8 in)
- Weight: 61 kg (134 lb)

Sport
- Sport: Swimming
- Strokes: Backstroke
- Club: Windsor Essex Swim Team Toronto Titans (ISL)
- College team: University of Toronto
- Coach: Byron MacDonald, Linda Keifer, Ben Titley, Ryan Mallette
Medal record
Women's swimming
Representing Canada
Event	1st	2nd	3rd
Olympic Games	0	2	3
World Championships (LC)	3	1	6
World Championships (SC)	0	7	4
Pan Pacific Championships	1	0	0
Commonwealth Games	3	7	0
Total	7	17	13
Olympic Games
Silver medal – second place	2020 Tokyo	100 m backstroke
Silver medal – second place	2020 Tokyo	200 m backstroke
Bronze medal – third place	2016 Rio de Janeiro	100 m backstroke
Bronze medal – third place	2020 Tokyo	4×100 m medley
Bronze medal – third place	2024 Paris	200 m backstroke
World Championships (LC)
Gold medal – first place	2017 Budapest	100 m backstroke
Gold medal – first place	2019 Gwangju	100 m backstroke
Gold medal – first place	2022 Budapest	50 m backstroke
Silver medal – second place	2022 Budapest	100 m backstroke
Bronze medal – third place	2017 Budapest	4×100 m mixed medley
Bronze medal – third place	2019 Gwangju	200 m backstroke
Bronze medal – third place	2019 Gwangju	4×100 m medley
Bronze medal – third place	2022 Budapest	4×100 m medley
Bronze medal – third place	2023 Fukuoka	4×100 m medley
Bronze medal – third place	2025 Singapore	4×100 m mixed medley
World Championships (SC)
Silver medal – second place	2016 Windsor	100 m backstroke
Silver medal – second place	2016 Windsor	4×100 m medley
Silver medal – second place	2021 Abu Dhabi	50 m backstroke
Silver medal – second place	2021 Abu Dhabi	100 m backstroke
Silver medal – second place	2021 Abu Dhabi	200 m backstroke
Silver medal – second place	2021 Abu Dhabi	4×100 m medley
Silver medal – second place	2024 Budapest	4x50 m mixed medley
Bronze medal – third place	2022 Melbourne	200 m backstroke
Bronze medal – third place	2022 Melbourne	4×100 m medley
Bronze medal – third place	2022 Melbourne	4×50 m mixed medley
Bronze medal – third place	2024 Budapest	50 m backstroke
Pan Pacific Championships
Gold medal – first place	2018 Tokyo	100 m backstroke
Commonwealth Games
Gold medal – first place	2018 Gold Coast	100 m backstroke
Gold medal – first place	2018 Gold Coast	200 m backstroke
Gold medal – first place	2022 Birmingham	50 m backstroke
Silver medal – second place	2018 Gold Coast	50 m backstroke
Silver medal – second place	2018 Gold Coast	4×100 m medley
Silver medal – second place	2022 Birmingham	100 m backstroke
Silver medal – second place	2022 Birmingham	200 m backstroke
Silver medal – second place	2022 Birmingham	4×100 m medley
Silver medal – second place	2022 Birmingham	4×100 m mixed medley
Silver medal – second place	2026 Glasgow	100 m backstroke
Summer Universiade
Gold medal – first place	2015 Gwangju	100 m backstroke

Kylie Jacqueline Masse (born January 18, 1996) is a Canadian competitive swimmer. A noted backstroke specialist, she is a five-time Olympic medallist, three-time World Aquatics champion, three-time Commonwealth Games gold medallist, and the 2018 Pan Pacific champion in the 100 metre backstroke.

After early success swimming at the university level, Masse had a breakout appearance at the 2016 Summer Olympics, winning a bronze medal in the 100 metre backstroke. Her victory in the same event at the 2017 World Aquatics Championships saw her become the first Canadian woman to win a swimming world title, in the process breaking an eight-year-old world record. She subsequently became the first Canadian woman to defend her world title at the 2019 World Aquatics Championships. She would win a third World Aquatics title, this time in the 50 metre event, in 2022. After collecting three medals at the 2020 Summer Olympics, her bronze medal in the 200 metre backstroke at the 2024 Summer Olympics made her the second Canadian swimmer to medal in three consecutive Olympic Games. Masse currently holds the Canadian record for medals at World Aquatics' short course and long course world championships, with a total of twenty-one.

== Career ==
=== Early career ===
Masse started swimming at a young age for the Windsor Essex Swim team and was coached by Andrei Semenov. She did not achieve success in the junior ranks, and in 2014 was rated 201st overall in the global rankings. She was then recruited to swim with the University of Toronto swim team, where her rapidly improving performances earned her the award for CIS swimmer of the year in both 2015 and 2016.

In April 2015, Masse participated in the Canadian swimming trials, hoping to make the team for the 2015 Pan American Games that were scheduled to be held on home soil in Toronto. She did not qualify for the Pan American Games, to her disappointment, but was instead named to the Canadian team for the 2015 Summer Universiade in Gwangju. In her first senior international event, Masse qualified to the final in the 100 m backstroke, where she was, at age 19, the youngest swimmer in the field. She won the gold medal, one of two for the Canadian team at the Universiade. Reflecting on the championship title five years later, Masse would remark that it "gave me so much confidence in my swimming" and propelled her to further results.

=== 2016 season ===
==== Summer Olympics ====
Masse qualified for the Canadian team for the 2016 Summer Olympics. Masse was Canada's lead competitor in the 100 m backstroke at the games, where she set and improved the national record in the 100 m backstroke in both the heats and semi-finals. In the final she swam to a bronze medal tie with Fu Yuanhui while again bettering the national record, setting it at 58.76.

On the final day of swimming competition, Masse participated in her second event of the games, performing the backstroke leg for the Canadian women's team in the 4 × 100 m medley relay. Expectations for the team had been somewhat raised due to the strong performances of members throughout, including both Masse and breakout star Penny Oleksiak, but they ultimately finished in fifth place.

==== World Swimming Championships ====
Following Rio de Janeiro, Masse's next event was her first World Swimming Championships, held in a short course (25 m) pool. The 2016 edition was held in her hometown of Windsor, Ontario, where her Olympic success had raised her to the level of local celebrity. Masse won the silver medal in the 100 m backstroke, finishing behind only reigning Olympic champion Katinka Hosszú. She won a second silver medal as part of the Canadian Canadian 4 × 100 m medley relay team. Commenting on the results, her coach Byron MacDonald predicted "the upside for Kylie is tremendous. You have to remember she's new to this. Anything can happen right now. She has not hit her limit yet."

=== 2017 season ===
At the 2017 Canadian Swimming Championships, Masse broke the Americas record in the 100 m backstroke in a time of 58.21, which was also the fastest time ever in a textile suit and the third-fastest time in history at that time.

Masse was assigned to compete at the 2017 World Aquatics Championships in Budapest. There she broke a world record that had stood for eight years, en route to winning her first world championship title in 58.10 seconds. She became the first Canadian woman to become a world champion and first Canadian to win a title since Brent Hayden. An elated Masse said after the race that "I don't think it's really sunk in yet. I touched the wall, I looked back and I had to make sure I was looking at the right name and the right time. I was just super excited in the moment. After the Olympics I just gained a lot more confidence in myself and experience. I gained a lot from just doing that routine for a week, doing prelims, semis and finals. All that experience really helps and makes you feel more confident."

Masse followed up her world record by participating in the final of the mixed 4 × 100 m medley with the lead-off backstroke leg of the race. Yuri Kisil anchored the team in the final freestyle leg, pulling the team into a tie for bronze with the Chinese team. She competed in the women's 200 m backstroke setting the Canadian record at 2:05.97 in the semis and qualifying for the final second overall, but was unable to duplicate her time and placed fifth at 2:07.04 ahead of teammate Hilary Caldwell. Following the championships the town of LaSalle, Ontario dedicated an August 18 day to fest her accomplishments and celebrated with her and a town barbecue.

=== 2018 season ===
Masse was named as part of Canada's team at the 2018 Commonwealth Games. She began her part of the competition in her preferred event, the 100 m. Masse set two Commonwealth Games records en route to the final. In the final she again set the record, just out-touching Emily Seebohm for the gold medal. After seeing she had won the event she told reports how she felt about the win and coming in to the event as the favourite, saying, "Relief, happiness. Just coming into another big meet with kind of a target on your back is something relatively new to me. So I’m still trying to kind of focus on my stroke and what I can control and not worry too much about outside pressures or anything like that." Masse followed up her victory in the 100 m back with a gold in the 200 m backstroke the next day. She again set a Commonwealth Games record, finishing ahead of 17-year-old teammate Taylor Ruck. Masse ended her games with a silver medal and a Canadian record in the 50 m backstroke and another silver medal in 4 × 100 m medley relay event.

Following the Commonwealth Games, Masse made her Pan Pacific Swimming Championships debut at the 2018 edition in Tokyo. The 100 m backstroke was anticipated to be one of the highlights, featuring as did reigning World champion Masse as well as top rivals Seebohm and Kathleen Baker, the latter having broken Masse's world record earlier in the season. Masse won the gold medal, finishing 0.11 ahead of Seebohm, though she came up short of reclaiming her world record. She also competed in the 200 m backstroke event, finishing in fourth place, 0.54 seconds behind bronze medallist Regan Smith. She was also part of the Canadian team in the 4 × 100 m medley relay, which finished in fourth place. Masse was named the female swimmer of the championships.

=== 2019–20 seasons ===
At the 2019 World Aquatics Championships Masse entered the competition to defend her title in the 100 m backstroke. In the final she found in herself in fourth place through the first 50 m but passed Minna Atherton on her way to her second consecutive world title in the 100. With the victory Masse became the first Canadian swimmer to defend a world title and only the second to win two golds at the event. She then competed in the 200 m backstroke where she finished in third place. Masse concluded her world championships with a third medal when she won bronze as part of the 4×100 medley relay and her fifth medal over her career at the event. Her three individual medals at worlds in total equalled the number achieved by fellow Canadian Sydney Pickrem and her five world medals in total now tied Penny Oleksiak.

On March 18, 2020, Masse was signed to the Toronto Titans of the International Swimming League as the team captain. This was to be Masse's first time in the ISL. However, the onset of the COVID-19 pandemic upended the planned swimming calendar, including delaying the 2020 Summer Olympics by a year. With training facilities closed in Canada starting in March, Masse was unable to train in a competitive environment for several months, resorting to out-of-water training at home and making use of her parents' pool. In June, she opted to leave the University of Toronto's swimming program to join the Canadian national team, as its facility was reopening.

After seven months away from competition, Masse travelled to Budapest to join the ISL. October 25, 2020, in her ISL debut during Match 3, she finished 8th in the match MVP standings with 30.5 points. She won the 100m backstroke with a time of 56.38 seconds. On November 1, 2020, during Match 6 of the ISL, Masse won the 50m backstroke and helped her team win the 4x100 medley relay. As a result, for the medley win, her team got to pick which skin they wanted to race in. On November 2, Masse won the 100m backstroke, and the skin for the 50m backstroke. On November 5, 2020, during Match 7, Masse won the 50m backstroke again.

=== 2021 season ===
==== Summer Olympics ====
Despite having already been named to the Canadian Olympic team, Masse competed at the national swimming trials, going below the 58-second mark for the first time to win the 100 m backstroke event with a time of 57.70 seconds. Competing first in the 100 m backstroke event, Masse was identified as one of the three medal favourites, alongside Australia's Kaylee McKeown and American Regan Smith. Masse set an Olympic record in her first heat, which was broken minutes later by McKeown, and then in turn by Smith. Masse won her semi-final over McKeown, while Smith won the other with a fourth Olympic record. In the event final, she came second behind McKeown, taking the silver medal in 57.72 seconds.

Masse's second event was the 200 m backstroke, which she had not contested at the Rio Olympics. She was again cited as one of the medal favourites, alongside McKeown and American Rhyan White, and placed second behind McKeown in both the heats and the semifinals, tying with White in the latter. In the final, Masse lead McKeown through the first three lengths of the race, ultimately being overtaken in the final stretch, and won her second silver medal of the Games. In the process she set a new national record.

For her final event, Masse was again the backstroke leg of Canada's team in the 4 × 100 m medley relay, facing off again against McKeown and Smith. Masse won her segment of the competition with a 57.90 time, while the Canadians took the bronze medal, Masse's fourth.

==== World Swimming Championships ====
Masse ended the year at the 2021 FINA World Swimming Championships in Abu Dhabi. Masse's first event was the 100 m backstroke, where she won silver, finishing just behind Sweden's Louise Hansson while setting a Canadian record in the process. She then competed in the 200 m where she won silver behind Rhyan White, though in this distance Masse told media she was disappointed with her time though content with the medal. Masse then competed in the 50 m where she won a third medal behind teammate Maggie Mac Neil who set a world record. She added a silver medal in the women's 4 × 100 m medley relay to win her fourth silver medal of the competition and tenth total medal won at a World Championships to make her the most decorated swimmer at the World Championships.

=== 2022 season ===
After competing at the Canadian swimming trials, Masse was named to the Canadian team for the 2022 World Aquatics Championships, held again in Budapest. Beginning the competition in the 100 m backstroke, she finished first in both her heat and her semi-final. She won the silver medal, finishing 0.18 behind Regan Smith, standing on her third consecutive World podium but missing another title defence. Masse then placed first in the heats and semi-finals of the 50 m backstroke, qualifying to that event final for the first time. She won the gold medal, her third at the World Championships, finishing 0.08 seconds ahead of American silver medallist Katharine Berkoff. Masse said that the win was a tribute to her "50 progress over the last couple of years." She missed the podium in the 200 m backstroke, finishing fifth, but won a bronze medal on the final day as part of the Canadian team in the 4 × 100 m medley relay.

A month later, Masse was part of her second Commonwealth Games team. On her first day of competing, she finished first in both the heats and semi-finals of the 100 m backstroke. Masse won the silver medal, 0.13 seconds behind Australian Kaylee McKeown. The 200 m backstroke was viewed as another contest between Masse and McKeown, which Masse again taking the silver medal. She said afterward that "I always know Kaylee is going to put down a great race and I tried to stick to my race plan and do the best I could." Qualifying to the final of the 50 m backstroke, she set a Games record of 27.47 in the semi-final. On the same day, she swam the backstroke leg for Canada in the mixed medley relay, winning another silver medal. Beginning the final day of competition, Masse won gold in the 50 m backstroke final, lowering her previous day's Games record again to 27.31, exactly equal to her winning time in Budapest earlier in the season. She then swam the backstroke leg of the 4 × 100 m medley relay, winning a final silver medal, her fifth medal of the Birmingham Games.

=== 2023 season ===
In what was considered a significant upset, Masse finished second in the 100 metre backstroke at the Canadian swimming trials, behind Ingrid Wilm. She won both the 50 and 200 metre distances.

Masse began the 2023 World Aquatics Championships in Fukuoka competing in the 100 m backstroke, where she finished fourth, nearly a second behind bronze medalist Berkoff. This was the first time she had failed to reach the podium in the event at the World Championships. Masse said she was "a little bit disappointed" afterward, acknowledging that "the 100 didn't come together this season." She participated in the mixed 4 × 100 m medley, where the Canadians finished in sixth place. Masse reached the final of the 50 m backstroke next, finished fourth as well, 0.08 behind Briton Lauren Cox for the bronze medal. Her time of 27.28 was faster than her winning time for the previous year. She said it was "the fastest I've gone this year so I have to be pleased with that." Masse recorded a fifth-place finish in the final of the 200 m backstroke, for the first time concluding a World Aquatics Championships without an individual medal. On the final day of the championships, she swam the backstroke leg for Canada in the 4 × 100 m medley relay, helping the team to another bronze medal. This was her ninth World Aquatics Championship medal, tying Oleksiak for the most by a Canadian swimmer, though her national record for the most gold medals was broken the same day by Summer McIntosh. She posted her fastest time of the week in the relay.

=== 2024 season ===
As with most of the Canadian team's top swimmers, Masse opted not to attend the 2024 World Aquatics Championships in Doha, citing its proximity to the 2024 Summer Olympics. Appearing at the national Olympic swimming trials, she won both the 100 m and 200 m backstroke events. She posted a time under 58 seconds in the former and under 2:07 in the latter, in both cases her best times since the Tokyo Olympics in 2021. Joining the Canadian Olympic team for the third time, she was a named captain of the swimming team.

==== Summer Olympics ====
Masse qualified to the final of the 100 m backstroke, becoming in the process only the third woman to appear in three consecutive Olympic finals in the event. She ultimately came fourth, 0.31 seconds behind bronze medalist Katharine Berkoff of the United States. In her second appearance of the Paris Games, Masse qualified for the final of the 200 m backstroke. She finished narrowly third, out-touching American Phoebe Bacon for the bronze medal by 0.04 seconds. This was Masse's fifth career Olympic medal, and she became the first Canadian female swimmer to medal at three consecutive Olympic Games, and second overall after Tom Ponting. Masse said that the result "means a lot" following her prior disappointment in the 100 metre event. She went on to make two further appearances in relay events, with the Canadian team coming fifth in the mixed 4 × 100 m medley and fourth in the women's 4 × 100 m medley.

==== World Swimming Championships ====
At the close of the year, Masse travelled to Budapest for the 2024 World Swimming Championships. On December 11 she won a silver medal with the Canadian team in the mixed 4×50 m medley relay, equaling retired teammate Maggie Mac Neil's record for the most medals by a Canadian swimmer from the short- and long-course World championships (19). Two days later she took bronze in the 50 m backstroke, her twentieth medal, moving into sole possession of the record. Masse called this "pretty special," adding that as many of her medals "were a part of relay teams so I feel very fortunate that I have such great teammates and have been given opportunities to race on relays in order to continue that count."

=== 2025 season ===
At the beginning of a new Olympic cycle, Masse declined to state whether she planned on continuing through to the 2028 Summer Olympics in Los Angeles, saying that she was "taking it moment by moment and figuring it out, and I'm not really putting any pressure on myself to commit to that at this point." She described herself as "pleasantly surprised" by her results at the national swimming trials.

Masse competed at the 2025 World Aquatics Championships in Singapore, with her first event being the 100 m backstroke. She qualified to the final third among the semi-finalists, but finished fourth in the final, 0.27 seconds behind bronze medalist Katharine Berkoff of the United States. The following day, she won a bronze medal swimming the backstroke leg for the Canadian team in the mixed 4 × 100 m medley relay. In her second individual event, the 50 m backstroke, Masse reached the final and finished fourth, 0.03 seconds behind Chinese bronze medalist Wan Letian.

=== 2026 season ===
Following the 2025 season, Masse returned to her hometown of LaSalle for the first extended period of time since 2014, remaining there for six months. This time away from training ultimately led to her recommitting to swimming, announcing that she aimed to compete at the 2028 Summer Olympics. After the 2026 national swimming trials, it was announced that she would be part of Canada's team for the 2026 Commonwealth Games, while sitting out the 2026 Pan Pacific Swimming Championships.

== Honours and awards ==
- 2016 Lieutenant Governor Athletic Awards
- Toronto Varsity Blues Female Athlete of the Year: 2016, 2017, 2018, 2019
- U Sports Female Athlete of the Month: February 2018

== Personal bests ==
=== Long course (50-metre pool) ===
Event	Time	Venue	Date	Notes
50 m backstroke	27.18	2022 Canadian Worlds Swimming Trials, Canada	April 6, 2022	NR
100 m backstroke	57.70	2020 Canadian Olympic Swimming Trials	June 19, 2021	NR
200 m backstroke	2:05.42	Tokyo Aquatics Centre, Tokyo	July 31, 2021	NR

=== Short course (25-metre pool) ===
Event	Time	Venue	Date	Notes
50 m backstroke	25.62	Abu Dhabi	December 17, 2021	
100 m backstroke	55.22	Abu Dhabi	December 15, 2021	NR
200 m backstroke	2:01.45	Eindhoven, Netherlands	November 13, 2021	NR

=== International Swimming League (25-metre pool) ===
Event	Time	Venue	Date
50 m backstroke	26.19	Danube Arena	November 2, 2020
100 m backstroke	56.06	Danube Arena	November 6, 2020
200 m backstroke	2:01.76	Danube Arena	November 5, 2020

Records
Preceded by Gemma Spofforth	Women's 100 metre backstroke world record holder (long course); July 25, 2017 – July 28, 2018	Succeeded by Kathleen Baker
