= Sophie Angus =

Canadian swimmer (born 1999)

Personal information
- Nationality: Canadian, American
- Born: March 12, 1999 (age 27) Weston, Connecticut, U.S.
- Height: 167 cm (5 ft 6 in)

Sport
- Sport: Swimming
- Strokes: Breaststroke
- College team: Northwestern University
Medal record
Women's swimming
Representing Canada
World Championships (LC)
Bronze medal – third place	2023 Fukuoka	4×100 m medley
Bronze medal – third place	2024 Doha	4×100 m medley
World Championships (SC)
Bronze medal – third place	2024 Budapest	4×100 m mixed medley
Commonwealth Games
Silver medal – second place	2022 Birmingham	4×100 m medley
Silver medal – second place	2022 Birmingham	4×100 m mixed medley
Pan American Games
Gold medal – first place	2023 Santiago	4 x 100 m medley
Silver medal – second place	2023 Santiago	100 m breaststroke
Universiade
Bronze medal – third place	2019 Naples	4×100 m medley

Sophie Angus (born March 12, 1999) is a Canadian swimmer who competes internationally for Canada. She won a bronze medal at the 2023 World Championships swimming the breaststroke leg in the women's 4×100 m medley.

== Career ==
Raised in Connecticut, Angus was the number 3 ranked graduating senior in high school in the state and ranked number 35 overall by collegeswimming.com. Angus remains the Connecticut record holder in the 100 m and 200 m breaststroke events. As a dual citizen of Canada and the United States, she was eligible to attend both countries' Olympic trials for the 2016 Summer Olympics. At the Canadian trials, she placed seventeenth in the 100 m breastroke, which gave her the qualifier time to participate in the 2016 United States Olympic trials. She appeared at the American trials as well, but did not make the team. Angus committed permanently to the Canadian national team and made the finals at the 2017 Canadian Swimming Trials.

Angus first represented Canada at the 2018 World Swimming Championships, where she finished in 26th place in the heats of the 100 m breaststroke. The following year, Angus made the Canadian team for the 2019 Summer Universiade, winning a bronze medal after swimming in the heats of the 4×100 m medley relay.

Angus contemplated retiring from competitive swimming in March 2022, but ultimately opted to continue, later citing her dreams of winning a World medal and qualifying to compete at the 2024 Summer Olympics. At the Canadian trials in April, she won the 100 m breaststroke gold with a personal best time of 1:07.60, which she said "shocked" her. This qualified Angus for her first World Aquatics Championships, appearing at the 2022 edition in Budapest and finishing 24th in the heats of the 100 m breaststroke. She was also part of Canada's team for the 2022 Commonwealth Games in Birmingham. Angus swam the breaststroke leg in the heats of the 4×100 m mixed medley. She was replaced by James Dergousoff in the final, but received a silver medal after the team finished second there. She won a second silver as part of the women's 4×100 m medley team, again assigned the breaststroke leg. Angus called the summer's results "something I never could have dreamed of."

At the 2023 Canadian trials, Angus won the 100 m breaststroke for the second consecutive year. At the 2023 World Aquatics Championships she did not advance out of the heats in either the 50 m or 100 m breaststroke, but won a bronze medal swimming the breaststroke leg for the Canadian team in the women's 4×100 m medley. Angus posted times of 1:06.30 in the heats and 1:06.21 in the relay final, both considered "surprise" results based on past performances. Her 1:06:21 was the second-best breaststroke split for a Canadian woman since Annamay Pierse's Canadian record performance of 1:05.74 in July 2009. Speaking afterward, Angus said the medal had fulfilled one of her dreams, and cited her teammates as "the ones that keep pushing me. I'm very glad I made that choice to still be here and looking forward to next year.""

While many of Canada's top swimmers opted to skip the 2024 World Aquatics Championships in Doha, Angus was named to the team. She reached the final of the 100 m breaststroke, finishing eighth of the eight finalists. Again swimming the breaststroke leg in the 4×100 m medley relay, she won a second consecutive bronze medal in the event.

== Personal ==
Angus was born in the United States to Canadian parents, and holds dual-citizenship. Her father Bruce Angus played soccer at Duke University before going on to play professionally in Canada. She attended college and competed at Northwestern University where both her father and mother graduated and received their masters degrees in business administration.
