= Regan Smith (swimmer) =

American swimmer (born 2002)

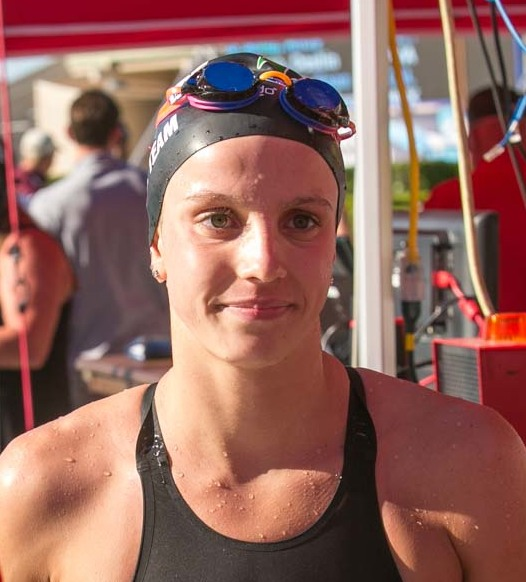
- Smith in 2018

Personal information
- Nickname: "Riptide Rocket"
- National team: United States
- Born: February 9, 2002 (age 24) Burlingame, California, U.S.
- Home town: Lakeville, Minnesota, U.S.
- Height: 5 ft 7 in (170 cm)
- Weight: 123 lb (56 kg)

Sport
- Sport: Swimming
- Strokes: Backstroke, butterfly
- Club: University of Texas (current); Arizona State University (former)
- College team: Stanford
- Coach: Bob Bowman
Medal record
Women's swimming
Representing the United States
Event	1st	2nd	3rd
Olympic Games	2	5	1
World Championships (LC)	6	7	1
World Championships (SC)	4	2	1
Pan Pacific Championships	1	2	1
World Junior Championships	2	2	0
Total	15	18	4
Olympic Games
Gold medal – first place	2024 Paris	4×100 m medley
Gold medal – first place	2024 Paris	4×100 m mixed medley
Silver medal – second place	2020 Tokyo	200 m butterfly
Silver medal – second place	2020 Tokyo	4×100 m medley
Silver medal – second place	2024 Paris	100 m backstroke
Silver medal – second place	2024 Paris	200 m backstroke
Silver medal – second place	2024 Paris	200 m butterfly
Bronze medal – third place	2020 Tokyo	100 m backstroke
World Championships (LC)
Gold medal – first place	2019 Gwangju	200 m backstroke
Gold medal – first place	2019 Gwangju	4×100 m medley
Gold medal – first place	2022 Budapest	100 m backstroke
Gold medal – first place	2022 Budapest	4×100 m medley
Gold medal – first place	2023 Fukuoka	4×100 m medley
Gold medal – first place	2025 Singapore	4×100 m medley
Silver medal – second place	2023 Fukuoka	50 m backstroke
Silver medal – second place	2023 Fukuoka	100 m backstroke
Silver medal – second place	2023 Fukuoka	200 m backstroke
Silver medal – second place	2025 Singapore	50 m backstroke
Silver medal – second place	2025 Singapore	100 m backstroke
Silver medal – second place	2025 Singapore	200 m backstroke
Silver medal – second place	2025 Singapore	200 m butterfly
Bronze medal – third place	2023 Fukuoka	200 m butterfly
World Championships (SC)
Gold medal – first place	2024 Budapest	50 m backstroke
Gold medal – first place	2024 Budapest	100 m backstroke
Gold medal – first place	2024 Budapest	200 m backstroke
Gold medal – first place	2024 Budapest	4×100 m medley
Silver medal – second place	2024 Budapest	200 m butterfly
Silver medal – second place	2024 Budapest	4×100 m mixed medley
Bronze medal – third place	2024 Budapest	4×50 m mixed medley
Pan Pacific Championships
Gold medal – first place	2026 Irvine	200 m backstroke
Silver medal – second place	2026 Irvine	50 m backstroke
Silver medal – second place	2026 Irvine	100 m backstroke
Bronze medal – third place	2018 Tokyo	200 m backstroke
World Junior Championships
Gold medal – first place	2017 Indianapolis	100 m backstroke
Gold medal – first place	2017 Indianapolis	200 m backstroke
Silver medal – second place	2017 Indianapolis	4×100 m medley
Silver medal – second place	2017 Indianapolis	4×100 m mixed medley

Regan Elisabeth Smith (/ˈreɪɡən/; born February 9, 2002) is an American competitive swimmer who specializes in backstroke and butterfly events.

As a teenager, Smith was regarded as the best American swimmer of her age group. She broke out on the international stage at the 2019 World Championships, winning two gold medals. At the 2020 Olympic Games, Smith won three medals but none of them gold. She then won two gold medals at the 2022 World Championships and five medals, including one gold, at the 2023 World Championships. At the 2024 Olympic Games, Smith won five medals, three silver and two gold. She won seven medals, including four golds, at the 2024 Short Course World Championships.

Smith holds the long course world record in the 100 m backstroke and formerly held the record in the 200 m backstroke. She holds the short course world records in the 50 m backstroke, 100 m backstroke, and formerly held the record in the 200 m backstroke.

== Career ==
=== Early life and career ===
Smith was raised in Lakeville, Minnesota. Smith started swimming at the Foss Swim School in 2007. When Smith was 12, she achieved multiple new age-group records and won medals at high school state meets. Following these successes, she joined Apple Valley's Riptide Swim Club and began to receive coaching from Mike Parratto, who was known for coaching 12-time Olympic medalist Jenny Thompson.

By the time she was 14, Smith was competing at meets with Olympians such as Missy Franklin and Katie Ledecky. Smith competed at the 2016 U.S. Olympic Trials. In 2016, she became a member of the U.S. national junior team and set national age group records in the 100 y backstroke, 100 y butterfly, and 100 m backstroke. She was named the 2016 Age Group Swimmer of the Year for 13–14 year-olds.

=== 2017 ===
In July 2017, Smith competed in her first major international meet at the 2017 World Championships. She qualified for the 200 m backstroke event final and finished eighth.

In August, Smith won gold medals in the 100 m backstroke and 200 m backstroke at the 2017 World Junior Championships. In the 100 m final, she broke Missy Franklin's 15–16 national age group record, as well as the world junior record previously set by Taylor Ruck in the semifinals. Smith also won silver medals in the 4×100 medley relay and 4×100 mixed medley relay. She was awarded the 2017 National Age Group Swimmer of the Year for 15–16 year-olds.

=== 2018 ===
At the 2018 U.S. National Championships in July, Smith set a new world junior record when she and Kathleen Baker (at the time the world record holder for the 100 m backstroke) tied for first in the 200 m backstroke with a time of 2:06.43. Smith also finished third in both the 100 m backstroke and 200 m butterfly.

In August 2018, Smith won her first senior international medal by taking bronze in the 200 m backstroke at the 2018 Pan Pacific Championships in Tokyo. She wrapped up 2018 by earning the Age Group Swimmer of the Year title for the third time in her career and the second time consecutively in the age group (15–16 year-olds).

=== 2019 ===
==== 2019 World Championships ====
2019 World Aquatics Championships

Women's swimming

Representing United States
Gold medal – first place	200 m backstroke	2:03.69
Gold medal – first place	4×100 m medley	3:50.40 (WR)

At the 2019 World Championships in Gwangju, South Korea, Smith competed in an individual event, the 200 m backstroke. In the heats and semifinals, she asserted herself as the favorite, recording a time of 2:06.01 in the heats and consequently breaking her own world junior record. In the semifinals, she surged away from the rest of the field and opened up a lead of two body lengths by the last 25 meters. She touched the wall with a time of 2:03.35, shattering Missy Franklin's world record of 2:04.06 that had stood since 2012. The next day in the final, Smith won her first World Championship title, claiming gold by a margin of more than two and a half seconds. She was well under her world record pace with a 100-meter split of 59.45 (a time that would have placed sixth in the 100 m backstroke final held earlier). Smith's pace fell off at the end, but she still managed to finish with the second-fastest 200 m backstroke ever with a time of 2:03.69.

Despite not qualifying for an individual spot in the 100 m backstroke, Smith was chosen as the backstroke leg for the United States in the 4 × 100 m medley relay final. She won gold along with Lilly King, Kelsi Dahlia, and Simone Manuel, with a world-record time of 3:50.40 to break the previous mark of 3:51.55 set in 2017. As the lead-off leg, Smith's split time was eligible for an official world record. Her lead-off split of 57.57 broke Kathleen Baker's 100 m backstroke world record of 58.00.

Smith was awarded 2019 American Swimmer of the Year and World Swimmer of the Year for her achievements in 2019 by Swimming World. She was also named 2019 National Age Group Swimmer of the Year (17–18 year-olds) by SwimSwam, her fourth such award of her career. For the year, she also received the Swammy Awards for World Junior Female Swimmer of the Year, becoming the first American swimmer to win the award, and Female Swimmer of the Year.

=== 2020 ===
==== 2020 U.S. Open Championships ====
In 2020, Smith graduated from Lakeville North High School in Lakeville, Minnesota. At the 2020 U.S. Open Championships, contested in December in a virtual competition format, Smith won the gold medal in the 200 m butterfly with a 2:08.61 and the silver medal in the 100 m backstroke with a 59.95. She placed fourth in the 200 m backstroke with a 2:11.74, fifth in the 100 m butterfly with a 58.09, and ninth in the 200 m individual medley with a 2:15.20.

=== 2021 ===
==== 2020 U.S. Olympic Trials ====
In June 2021, Smith competed at the 2020 U.S. Olympic Trials and qualified for a spot on the U.S. Olympic team. She won the 100 m backstroke final with a time of 58.35. Earlier in the competition, she set a new U.S. Open record of 57.92 when she won the semifinals of the 100 m backstroke. Smith also swam a 57.73 in the semifinals of the 100 m butterfly, ranked sixth, qualified for the final, and did not swim in the event final.

On day four of the Olympic Trials, Smith advanced to the final of the 200 m butterfly with a time of 2:07.89 and ranking second overall in the semifinals. In the final, she placed second with a time of 2:06.99, qualifying to swim the event at the Olympic Games. Smith competed in the preliminary heats of the 200 m backstroke on day six of the trials, swimming a 2:07.81 and advancing to the semifinals. In the evening semifinals, she ranked first with a time of 2:07.23 and qualified for the final. In the 200 m backstroke final, she finished third with a time of 2:06.79 and did not qualify to swim the event at the Olympic Games.

==== 2020 Olympic Games ====
2020 Olympic Games
Silver medal – second place	200 m butterfly	2:05.30
Silver medal – second place	4×100 m medley	3:51.73
Bronze medal – third place	100 m backstroke	58.05

Heading into the 2020 Olympic Games in Tokyo, Smith was one of 17 entrants in the 200 m butterfly and one of 43 entrants in the 100 m backstroke. In the prelims of the 100 m backstroke on day two of competition, she advanced to the semifinals and set a new Olympic record in the event with a time of 57.96, which was broken in the last preliminary heat by Kaylee McKeown, who swam a 57.88. Smith set the Olympic record again in the semifinals, recording a time of 57.86 and advancing to the final ranked first. In the final, she won the bronze medal with a time of 58.05. It was her first Olympic medal.

In the evening of the fourth day of competition, Smith swam the fourth-fastest time out of all swimmers in the 200 m butterfly prelims and qualified for the semifinals. In the competition session the following morning, she ranked fourth overall with a time of 2:06.64 in the semifinals and advanced to the final. She won a silver medal in the final of the 200 m butterfly with a time of 2:05.30. On day nine of competition, Smith competed in the 4 × 100 m medley relay final as the backstroke leg for the U.S. alongside Lydia Jacoby, Torri Huske, and Abbey Weitzeil. The U.S. won the silver medal with a time of 3:51.73, finishing just 0.13 seconds behind Australia's Olympic-record performance of 3:51.60.

==== 2021 NCAA regular season ====
Smith started competing collegiately for Stanford University in the fall of 2021. At her first collegiate swim meet, a dual meet against San Jose State University in October, Smith won her two individual events, the 200 y butterfly and the 200 y individual medley, as well as the 4×50-medley relay. On the first day of the 2021 North Carolina State Invitational in November, Smith placed seventh in the 500 y freestyle with a time of 4:43.86 and helped the 4×100 y medley relay place second in 3:28.76, splitting a 50.06 for the backstroke leg of the relay. On the second day of competition, she placed second in the 4×50 y medley relay with her teammates, swimming a 23.74 on the backstroke leg, won the 100 y backstroke with a final time of 49.97 seconds, and helped win the 4×200 y freestyle relay, splitting a 1:44.95 for the relay's second leg. In the evening of the third and final day of competition, Smith won the 200 y backstroke in 1:48.91 and the 200 y butterfly in 1:52.48.

Switching over to long course meters in December, Smith won two individual events on the last day of competition at the 2021 U.S. Open Championships, the 200 m butterfly with a time of 2:10.58 and the 200 m backstroke in a new championship record time of 2:07.09. Earlier in the championships, Smith won the title in the 100 m backstroke, meaning she won each of the three events she competed in during the competition.

=== 2022 ===
==== 2022 Pac-12 Championships ====
Smith started off the Pac-12 Conference Championships on day one with two first-place finishes, one in the 4×50 y medley relay, where she swam the backstroke leg of the relay in 23.18, and one in the 4×200 y freestyle relay, where she split a 1:43.19 for the third leg. On the third day of competition, Smith placed second in the 100 y butterfly with a 49.87. In her second event of the evening, the 100 y backstroke, she won the conference title in a new Pac-12 Conference record of 49.50. In her third event of the day, Smith split a 49.23 for the backstroke leg of the 4×100 y medley relay to lower her Pac-12 Conference record in the 100 y backstroke and help achieve a first-place finish in 3:25.54. On the fourth and final day of competition, she won the 200 y butterfly with a 1:50.99 and helped to win the 4×100 y freestyle relay in 3:09.06, splitting a 47.41 for the third leg.

==== 2022 NCAA Championships ====
In her first event of the 2022 NCAA Division I Championships, the 4×50 y medley relay, Smith split a 24.31 for the backstroke leg of the relay, helping place tenth with a final time of 1:34.97. For her second event of the first day, she helped win the 4×200 y freestyle relay in a pool record time of 6:48.30, swimming a 1:43.35 for the third leg. On day three, Smith placed third in the 100 y backstroke with a time of 49.96. She achieved another third-place finish in her second event of the evening, the 4×100 y medley relay, where she split a 49.81 for the backstroke leg to contribute to a final time of 3:25.63. On the fourth and final day of competition, Smith won the 200 y backstroke in 1:47.76, marking her first individual NCAA title, setting a new pool record, and finishing over 1.50 seconds ahead of the second-place finisher. In her other two events, she tied for second in the 200 y butterfly with a 1:51.19 and contributed a split of 47.74 seconds to the 4×100 y freestyle relay for the third leg to help achieve a second-place finish in 3:08.97.

Following the end of the 2021–2022 collegiate season, Smith left Stanford University and turned professional. She started training with coach Bob Bowman and the Sun Devils, based at Arizona State University. Smith believed she would be able to increase her training intensity with the switch and mentioned her future goals, saying "Bob's leadership and training will have me exactly where I want to be for Paris 2024."

==== 2022 World Championships ====
2022 World Championships
Gold medal – first place	100 m backstroke	58.22
Gold medal – first place	4×100 m medley	3:53.78

At the 2022 U.S. International Team Trials in April in Greensboro, North Carolina, Smith qualified for the 2022 World Championships in three individual events, the 50 m backstroke, 100 m backstroke, and 200 m butterfly.

On day three of the World Championships, held in June in Budapest, Hungary, Smith won the gold medal in the 100 m backstroke with a time of 58.22, finishing less than two-tenths of a second ahead of silver medalist Kylie Masse. Two days later, Smith started off the evening finals session with a fourth-place finish in the 200 m butterfly in a time of 2:06.79. Approximately 30 minutes later, she concluded the day with a tie for fifth-place in the 50 m backstroke, finishing 0.07 seconds behind bronze medalist Analia Pigrée with a time of 27.47. For her final event of the championships, the 4 × 100 m medley relay on day eight, she led-off with a 58.40 to contribute to the gold medal-winning time of 3:53.78.

==== 2022 U.S. Open Championships ====
At the 2022 U.S. Open Championships, her first competition following a change of training setting to the Sun Devils professional group at Arizona State, Smith set a personal best time of 2:11.66 in the preliminary heats of the 200 m individual medley on day two. In the evening final, she improved upon her personal best time, lowering it to a 2:10.40 to win the gold medal. The following day, she won her second gold medal, achieving a first-place finish in the 100 m butterfly with a time of 57.65. For her third gold medal, she won the 100 m backstroke with a championship record of 57.95, which was 0.68 seconds faster than the former mark set in 2019 by Phoebe Bacon. On day four of four, Smith won the gold medal in the 200 m backstroke with a championship record time of 2:05.28, finishing over a second ahead of silver medalist Summer McIntosh. Later in the same session, she concluded the championships with a fifth gold medal, winning the 200 m butterfly with a time of 2:07.30.

=== 2023 ===
==== 2023 TYR Pro Swim Series ====
In March 2023, at the TYR Pro Swim Series in Fort Lauderdale, Florida, Smith achieved a pair of personal best times, first placing fourth in the 200 m freestyle with a 1:58.14 on day two, then winning the 100 m butterfly with a time of 56.60 on day three.

In April 2023, the next leg of the TYR Pro Swim Series took place in Westmont, Illinois. Smith qualified for finals in four events, the 200 m butterfly, 100 m backstroke, 200 m backstroke, and 100 m butterfly. She won each of these events. Smith swam a time of 2:04.76 in the 200 m backstroke to break the U.S. Open record.

==== 2023 Sun Devil Open ====
In June, at the 2023 Sun Devil Open in Tempe, Arizona, Smith swam a personal best in the 200 m butterfly with a time of 2:03.87, breaking the American record in the process and becoming the first American woman under the 2:04 mark. Her time in the 200 m butterfly was the fourth-fastest time in history. Smith also swam a personal best in the 200 m individual medley with a time of 2:08.48.

==== 2023 World Championships ====
2023 World Championships
Gold medal – first place	4×100 m medley	3:52.08
Silver medal – second place	50 m backstroke	27.11
Silver medal – second place	100 m backstroke	57.78
Silver medal – second place	200 m backstroke	2:04.94
Bronze medal – third place	200 m butterfly	2:06.58

At the 2023 World Championships in Fukuoka, Japan, Smith collected five total medals, four individual medals and one relay medal. In her first final of the competition, Smith won a silver medal in the 100 m backstroke with a time of 57.78. During the next day's semifinals, she swam the 50 m backstroke in 27.10, setting an American record. Smith swam two events in the next finals session, the 200 m butterfly and 50 m backstroke. She earned bronze with a time of 2:06.58 in the 200 m butterfly and silver in the 50 m backstroke with a 27.11. Smith earned silver in the 200 m backstroke with a time of 2:04.94. Smith's second-place finishes in the backstroke events were behind the world record holder in the 200 m backstroke and 100 m backstroke, Australia's Kaylee McKeown. For her final race of the competition, Smith swam the backstroke leg of the 4×100 medley relay with a split of 57.68. With a time of 3:52.08, the team consisting of Smith, Lilly King, Gretchen Walsh, and Kate Douglass, won the gold medal.

==== 2023 U.S. Open Championships ====
At the 2023 U.S. Open Championships in Greensboro, North Carolina, Smith's performance was highlighted by her results on the final night. She won gold in both the 200 m backstroke and 200 m butterfly by a little over two seconds. She went a 2:04.27 in the 200 m backstroke to go a championship record by over two seconds, set by herself the previous year. In the 200 m butterfly, she went a 2:06.72 to beat the championship record from 1999 by about half a second. The previous meet record was held by Susie O'Neill. The previous night, Smith won the 100 m backstroke in a time of 58.16. She had two personal best times at the meet, in the 400 m individual medley and 200 m individual medley, placing third and fifth in each event respectively in times of 4:38.77 and 2:09.50.

=== 2024 ===
==== 2024 Olympic Games ====
2024 Olympic Games
Gold medal – first place	4×100 m medley	3:49.63 (WR)
Gold medal – first place	4×100 m mixed medley	3:37.43 (WR)
Silver medal – second place	100 m backstroke	57.66
Silver medal – second place	200 m backstroke	2:04.26
Silver medal – second place	200 m butterfly	2:03.84

At the 2024 U.S. Olympic Trials, Smith won the 100 m backstroke, 200 m backstroke, and 200 m butterfly, and she finished third in the 100 m butterfly. She broke the world record in the 100 m backstroke.

At the 2024 Olympic Games in Paris, Smith won silver medals in the 100 m backstroke, 200 m backstroke, and 200 m butterfly, finishing behind Kaylee McKeown in the backstroke events and behind Summer McIntosh in the butterfly. This pushed her medal tally to six Olympic medals, including five silver. Smith broke the American record in the 200 m butterfly. She swam in the heats of the 4×100 mixed medley relay, and the U.S. won in the final, finally earning Smith her first Olympic gold medal. She then swam in the final of the 4×100 medley relay, helping the U.S. win gold.

==== 2024 World Cup ====
Smith competed in the 2024 World Cup circuit, consisting of three short course meets in October and November. She won nine total events, sweeping all three in the 100 m backstroke and 200 m backstroke, two in the 50 m backstroke, and one in the 200 m butterfly. In the process, Smith broke the short course world records in the 100 m backstroke and 200 m backstroke. She finished second in the overall World Cup standings.

==== 2024 Short Course World Championships ====
2024 Short Course World Championships
Gold medal – first place	50 m backstroke	25.23 (WR)
Gold medal – first place	100 m backstroke	54.55 (CR)
Gold medal – first place	200 m backstroke	1:58.04 (WR)
Gold medal – first place	4×100 m medley	3:40.41 (WR)
Silver medal – second place	200 m butterfly	2:01.00 (NR)
Silver medal – second place	4×100 m mixed medley	3:30.55
Bronze medal – third place	4×50 m mixed medley	1:36.20

At the 2024 Short Course World Championships in December, Smith competed in seven events, winning four gold medals, two silver medals, and one bronze medal. She set personal bests in four events.

On December 11, Smith won gold in the 100 m backstroke, breaking the championship record. Later that night, she swam the butterfly leg in the 4 × 50 m mixed medley final, helping the U.S. team win bronze. On December 12, Smith won silver in the 200 m butterfly, breaking the American record. On December 13, she won gold in the 50 m backstroke, breaking the world record. On December 14, she swam the backstroke leg in the 4 × 100 m mixed medley final, helping the U.S. win silver. On December 15, Smith won gold in the 200 m backstroke, breaking her own world record. Later that night, she swam the backstroke leg in the 4 × 100 m medley final, breaking her own individual world record, while helping the U.S. win gold and break the event world record.

== International championships ==
Meet	50 backstroke	100 backstroke	200 backstroke	200 butterfly	4×100 medley	4×100 mixed medley
WC 2017			8th			
WC 2019			1st place, gold medalist(s)		1st place, gold medalist(s)	
OG 2021	—N/a	3rd place, bronze medalist(s)		2nd place, silver medalist(s)	2nd place, silver medalist(s)	5th^{[a]}
WC 2022	5th	1st place, gold medalist(s)		4th	1st place, gold medalist(s)	
WC 2023	2nd place, silver medalist(s)	2nd place, silver medalist(s)	2nd place, silver medalist(s)	3rd place, bronze medalist(s)	1st place, gold medalist(s)	
OG 2024	—N/a	2nd place, silver medalist(s)	2nd place, silver medalist(s)	2nd place, silver medalist(s)	1st place, gold medalist(s)	(gold) ^{[a]}
WC 2025	2nd place, silver medalist(s)	2nd place, silver medalist(s)	2nd place, silver medalist(s)	2nd place, silver medalist(s)	1st place, gold medalist(s)	

^{a} Smith swam only in the preliminaries.

== Personal bests ==
=== Long course (50 m pool) ===
Event	Time		Meet	Location	Date	Notes	Ref
50 m backstroke	27.10	sf	2023 World Championships	Fukuoka, Japan	July 26, 2023	AM	
100 m backstroke	57.13		2024 U.S. Olympic Trials	Indianapolis, United States	June 18, 2024	WR	
200 m backstroke	2:03.35	sf	2019 World Championships	Gwangju, South Korea	July 26, 2019	WJ, former WR	
100 m butterfly	55.62		2024 U.S. Olympic Trials	Indianapolis, United States	June 16, 2024		
200 m butterfly	2:03.84		2024 Olympic Games	Paris, France	August 1, 2024	NR	
200 m freestyle	1:58.14		2023 TYR Pro Swim Series	Fort Lauderdale, United States	March 3, 2023		

=== Short course (25 m pool) ===
Event	Time		Meet	Location	Date	Notes	Ref
50 m backstroke	25.23		2024 World Championships (25 m)	Budapest, Hungary	December 13, 2024	style="text-align:center;"	
100 m backstroke	54.02	r	2024 World Championships (25 m)	Budapest, Hungary	December 15, 2024	WR	
200 m backstroke	1:57.86		2025 World Cup (25 m)	Toronto, Canada	October 25, 2025	List of world records in swimming	
200 m butterfly	2:01.00		2024 World Championships (25 m)	Budapest, Hungary	December 12, 2024	NR	

Legend: WR – World record; AM – Americas record; NR – American record; e – equalled existing record; WJ – World Junior record;
Records not set in finals: h – heat; sf – semifinal; r – relay 1st leg; rh – relay heat 1st leg; b – B final; † – en route to final mark; so – swim-off; tt – time trial

== World records ==
=== Long course (50 m pool) ===
Event	Time		Meet	Location	Date	Type	Status	Ref
200 m backstroke	2:07.19	sf	2017 World Championships	Budapest, Hungary	July 28, 2017	WJ	Former	
100 m backstroke	59.11		2017 World Junior Championships	Indianapolis, United States	August 24, 2017	WJ	Former	
100 m backstroke	59.11	r	2017 World Junior Championships	Indianapolis, United States	August 28, 2017	=WJ	Former	
200 m backstroke (2)	2:06.43		2018 U.S. National Championships	Irvine, United States	July 26, 2018	WJ	Former	
100 m backstroke (2)	59.09	h	2018 U.S. National Championships	Irvine, United States	July 28, 2018	WJ	Former	
100 m backstroke (3)	58.83		2018 U.S. National Championships	Irvine, United States	July 28, 2018	WJ	Former	
200 m backstroke (3)	2:06.01	h	2019 World Championships	Gwangju, South Korea	July 26, 2019	WJ	Former	
200 m backstroke (4)	2:03.35	sf	2019 World Championships	Gwangju, South Korea	July 26, 2019	WR	Former	
200 m backstroke (4)	2:03.35	sf	2019 World Championships	Gwangju, South Korea	July 26, 2019	WJ	Current	
100 m backstroke (4)	57.57	r	2019 World Championships	Gwangju, South Korea	July 28, 2019	WR	Former	
100 m backstroke (4)	57.57	r	2019 World Championships	Gwangju, South Korea	July 28, 2019	WJ	Current	
100 m backstroke (5)	57.13		2024 U.S. Olympic Trials	Indianapolis, United States	June 18, 2024	WR	Current	

=== Short course (25 m pool) ===
Event	Time		Meet	Location	Date	Type	Status	Ref
100 m backstroke	54.41		2024 World Cup	Incheon, South Korea	October 25, 2024	WR	Former	
100 m backstroke (2)	54.27		2024 World Cup	Singapore	November 1, 2024	WR	Former	
200 m backstroke	1:58.83		2024 World Cup	Singapore	November 2, 2024	WR	Former	
50 m backstroke	25.23		2024 World Championships (25 m)	Budapest, Hungary	December 13, 2024	WR	Current	
200 m backstroke (2)	1:58.04		2024 World Championships (25 m)	Budapest, Hungary	December 15, 2024	WR	Former	
100 m backstroke (3)	54.02	r	2024 World Championships (25 m)	Budapest, Hungary	December 15, 2024	WR	Current	
100 m backstroke (4)	54.02		2025 World Cup	Westmont, Illinois, United States	October 18, 2025	=WR	Current	

Legend: WR – World record; e – equalled existing record; WJ – World Junior record;
Records not set in finals: h – heat; sf – semifinal; r – relay 1st leg; rh – relay heat 1st leg; b – B final; † – en route to final mark; so – swim-off; tt – time trial

== Awards and honors ==
- SwimSwam Swammy Award, Junior Swimmer of the Year (female): 2019
- SwimSwam Swammy Award, Age Group Swimmer of the Year 17—18 (female): 2019, 2020
- SwimSwam Swammy Award, Age Group Swimmer of the Year 15—16 (female): 2017, 2018
- SwimSwam Swammy Award, Age Group Swimmer of the Year 13—14 (female): 2016
- Golden Goggle Award, Breakout Performer of the Year: 2019
- Golden Goggle Award, Female Race of the Year: 2019
- Golden Goggle Award, Relay Performance of the Year: 2019, 2025
- Swimming World, World Swimmer of the Year (female): 2019
- Swimming World, American Swimmer of the Year (female): 2019
- SwimSwam Swammy Award, Swimmer of the Year (female): 2019
- SwimSwam Top 100 (Women's): 2021 (#2), 2022 (#11)
- Pac-12 Conference, Swimmer of the Year (women's): 2022
- Pac-12 Conference, Freshman of the Year (women's): 2022
- Pac-12 Conference, Swimmer of the Week (women's): January 26, 2022, February 2, 2022
- Golden Goggle Awards, Relay Performance of the Year: 2024

Records
Preceded by (United States) Missy Franklin	Women's 200-meter backstroke world record-holder (long course); July 26, 2019 – March 10, 2023	Succeeded by (Australia) Kaylee McKeown
Preceded by (United States) Kathleen Baker (Australia) Kaylee McKeown	Women's 100-meter backstroke world record-holder (long course); July 28, 2019 – June 13, 2021; June 18, 2024 – present	Succeeded by (Australia) Kaylee McKeown; Incumbent
Awards
Preceded by Katie Ledecky	Swimming World; World Swimmer of the Year; 2019	Succeeded by Emma McKeon
Preceded by Katie Ledecky	American Swimmer of the Year; 2019	Succeeded by Katie Ledecky
