= Katharine Berkoff =

American swimmer (born 2001)

- With bronze (right) at the Paris 2024 Olympic Games

Personal information
- Born: January 28, 2001 (age 25) Missoula, Montana, U.S.
- Height: 1.75 m (5 ft 9 in)

Sport
- Country: United States
- Sport: Swimming
- Strokes: Backstroke, freestyle
- College team: North Carolina State
- Coach: Braden Holloway (NC State)
Medal record
Women's swimming
Representing the United States
Event	1st	2nd	3rd
Olympic Games	1	0	1
World Championships (LC)	3	1	3
World Championships (SC)	4	5	2
Pan Pacific Championships	3	0	0
Summer Universiade	2	0	0
World Junior Championships	0	1	1
Total	13	7	7
Olympic Games
Gold medal – first place	2024 Paris	4×100 m medley
Bronze medal – third place	2024 Paris	100 m backstroke
World Championships (LC)
Gold medal – first place	2023 Fukuoka	4×100 m medley
Gold medal – first place	2025 Singapore	50 m backstroke
Gold medal – first place	2025 Singapore	4×100 m medley
Silver medal – second place	2022 Budapest	50 m backstroke
Bronze medal – third place	2023 Fukuoka	100 m backstroke
Bronze medal – third place	2023 Fukuoka	4×100 m mixed medley
Bronze medal – third place	2025 Singapore	100 m backstroke
World Championships (SC)
Gold medal – first place	2021 Abu Dhabi	4×50 m freestyle
Gold medal – first place	2021 Abu Dhabi	4×100 m freestyle
Gold medal – first place	2024 Budapest	4×100 m freestyle
Gold medal – first place	2024 Budapest	4×100 m medley
Silver medal – second place	2021 Abu Dhabi	4×200 m freestyle
Silver medal – second place	2021 Abu Dhabi	4×50 m medley
Silver medal – second place	2021 Abu Dhabi	4×50 m mixed medley
Silver medal – second place	2024 Budapest	50 m backstroke
Silver medal – second place	2024 Budapest	100 m backstroke
Bronze medal – third place	2021 Abu Dhabi	100 m backstroke
Bronze medal – third place	2024 Budapest	4×50 m mixed medley
Pan Pacific Championships
Gold medal – first place	2026 Irvine	50 m backstroke
Gold medal – first place	2026 Irvine	100 m backstroke
Gold medal – first place	2026 Irvine	4×100 m medley
Summer Universiade
Gold medal – first place	2019 Naples	100 m backstroke
Gold medal – first place	2019 Naples	4×100 m medley
Junior Pan Pacific Championships
Silver medal – second place	2018 Suva	100 m backstroke
Bronze medal – third place	2018 Suva	200 m backstroke

Katharine Berkoff (born January 28, 2001) is an American female swimmer who competed for North Carolina State University and won a gold medal in the 4x100 medley relay and a bronze medal in the 100-meter backstroke at the 2024 Summer Olympics in Paris. A prolific international competitor, she won fifteen medals, including five golds, at Short course and Long course World Championships between 2021 and 2024 in individual backstroke and both freestyle and medley relay events.

== Career ==
=== Early career ===
Berkoff was born in 2001. She is the daughter of Shirley Gustafson and David Berkoff, a former swimmer who won four medals at the Summer Olympics.

Berkoff grew up in Missoula, Montana, and attended Hellgate High School.

She competed at the 2018 Junior Pan Pacific Championships in August. She won the silver medal in the 100 m backstroke and the bronze medal in the 200 m backstroke.

In July 2019, Berkoff competed at the 2019 Summer Universiade. She won the gold medal in the 100 m backstroke and broke the meet record. Then, she finished fourth in the 50 m backstroke. In the women's 4 × 100 m medley relay, she won a gold medal.

=== North Carolina State University ===
Berkoff attended North Carolina State University, where she swam for Head Coach Braden Holloway, a ten-time Atlantic Coast Conference Coach of the Year. She would become NC State's first female Olympian. She started competing for North Carolina in her freshman year from 2019 to 2020, competing through 2023.

=== 2021 ===
Berkoff competed at the 2021 NCAA Division I Championships in March. She won the gold medal in the 100 y backstroke and finished sixth in the 200 y backstroke. Berkoff won gold medals in the women's 200 y medley relay and the women's 400 y medley relay. She won a bronze medal in the women's 200 y freestyle relay.

In June, Berkoff competed at the 2020 U.S. Olympic trials and finished fourth in the 100 m backstroke.

In December, Berkoff competed at the 2021 World Championships (25 m). In the women's 4 × 100 m freestyle relay, she swam in the heats and the final, winning a gold medal. In the women's 4 × 50 m medley relay, she swam in the heats, and the American team finished second in the final, earning her a silver medal. In the 100 m backstroke, Berkoff won the bronze medal. In the mixed 4 × 50 m medley relay, she swam in the heats, and the American team finished second in the final, earning her a silver medal. In the women's 4 × 200 m freestyle relay, she swam in the heats, and the American team finished second in the final, earning her a silver medal. In the women's 4 × 50 m freestyle relay, she swam in the heats and the final, winning a gold medal. In the women's 4 × 100 m medley relay, she swam in the heats and the final, helping the American team finish fourth.

=== 2022 ===
Berkoff competed at the 2022 NCAA Division I Championships in March. She won the gold medal in the 100 y backstroke while breaking the NCAA record. She also won the bronze medal in the 100 y freestyle. Berkoff won silver medals in the women's 200 y medley relay and the women's 400 y medley relay. She won a bronze medal in the women's 200 y freestyle relay.

In April, Berkoff competed at the 2022 U.S. International Team Trials. She won the gold medal in the 50 m backstroke, breaking the American record. She also finished fourth in the 100 m backstroke.

In June, Berkoff competed at the 2022 World Championships and won the silver medal in the 50 m backstroke.

=== 2023 ===
Berkoff competed at the 2023 NCAA Division I Championships in March. She won the silver medal in the 100 y backstroke. She also finished fifth in the 50 y freestyle and fifth in the 100 y freestyle. Berkoff won silver medals in the women's 200 y medley relay and the women's 400 y medley relay.

In June, Berkoff competed at the 2023 U.S. National Championships. She won the gold medal in the 50 m backstroke and won the silver medal in the 100 m backstroke.

In July, Berkoff competed at the 2023 World Championships. In the 100 m backstroke, she won the bronze medal. In the mixed 4 × 100 m medley relay, she swam in the heats, and the American team finished third in the final, earning her a bronze medal. In the 50 m backstroke, Berkoff finished fifth. In the women's 4 × 100 m medley relay, she swam in the heats, and the American team finished first in the final, earning her a gold medal.

== 2024 Paris Olympics ==
Berkoff won a gold medal, swimming leadoff backstroke in the first preliminary of the 4 × 100 m medley, finishing her preliminary leg with a time of 58.98, and her preliminary team finishing with a time of 3:56.40. The American gold medal team later swam a world record time of 3:49.63 in the finals without Berkoff, with Australia taking the silver, and China taking the bronze.

Favored to medal in the Women's 100 m backstroke, she won the bronze medal with a time of 57.98. In a close finish, Australia's Kaylee McKeown took the gold in the Olympic record time of 57.33, and America's Regan Smith took the silver with a time of 57.66.
