= Lauren Cox (swimmer) =

English swimmer

Personal information
- Nationality: British (English)
- Born: 27 November 2001 (age 24) Leamington Spa, England

Sport
- Sport: Swimming
- Strokes: Backstroke
- Club: City of Coventry
Medal record
Women's swimming
Representing Great Britain
World Championships (LC)
Bronze medal – third place	2023 Fukuoka	50 m backstroke
European Championships (LC)
Gold medal – first place	2026 Paris	4×100 m medley
Bronze medal – third place	2022 Rome	4×100 m mixed medley
Bronze medal – third place	2026 Paris	50 m backstroke
European Championships (SC)
Gold medal – first place	2025 Lublin	100 m backstroke
European Junior Championships
Silver medal – second place	2018 Helsinki	50 m backstroke
Representing England
Commonwealth Games
Bronze medal – third place	2022 Birmingham	4×100 m medley
Bronze medal – third place	2022 Birmingham	4×100 m mixed medley

Lauren Cox (born 27 November 2001) is an English international swimmer representing Great Britain in FINA and LEN competition. Representing Great Britain, Cox won the gold medal in the 100 metre backstroke at the 2025 European Short Course Swimming Championships in Lublin, Poland. She has represented England at the Commonwealth Games.

== Biography ==
Cox was educated at King Henry VIII School, Coventry. A private school in the city of Coventry

Cox educated at Loughborough University won two medals including the gold medal in the 50 metres backstroke event, at the 2022 British Swimming Championships.

In 2022, she was selected for the 2022 Commonwealth Games in Birmingham where she competed in two events; the women's 50 metres backstroke, finishing in 4th place and the women's 100 metres backstroke, finishing in 5th place.

In 2023, she won the gold medal at the 2023 British Swimming Championships in the 50 metres backstroke. It was the second time that she had won the 50 metres title.

In 2025, Cox won her third consecutive 50 metres backstroke title at the 2025 Aquatics GB Swimming Championships and earned selection for the 2025 World Aquatics Championships in Singapore. Subsequently at the World Championships, she reached the final of the 50 metres backstroke.
