= Carmen Weiler =

Spanish swimmer (born 2004)

Personal information
- Full name: Carmen Weiler Sastre
- Born: 25 October 2004 (age 21) Bangkok, Thailand

Sport
- Sport: Swimming
Medal record
Representing Spain
European Championships (SC)
Gold medal – first place	2025 Lublin	200 m backstroke
European Youth Olympic Festival
Bronze medal – third place	2019 Baku	100 m freestyle
European Junior Championships
Gold medal – first place	2021 Rome	50 m backstroke

Carmen Weiler Sastre (born 25 October 2004) is a Spanish swimmer, having her best results at backstroke events.

== Career ==
She competed in the women's 100 metre backstroke at the 2024 Summer Olympics, where she stablished a new Spanish national record in the preliminary heats, with a time of 59.57 seconds, qualifying to the semifinals. In this event she finished in a final 9th overall position.

She was born and raised in Singapore to a German father and a Spanish mother.
