= Swimming at the 2020 European Aquatics Championships – Women's 200 metre backstroke =

Women's 200 metre backstroke at the 2020 European Aquatics Championships
- Venue: Danube Arena
- Dates: 22 May 2021 (heats and semifinals); 23 May 2021 (final)
- Competitors: 36 from 26 nations
- Winning time: 2:06.08

Medalists
gold medal	Margherita Panziera	Italy
silver medal	Cassie Wild	Great Britain
bronze medal	Katalin Burián	Hungary

The Women's 200 metre backstroke competition of the 2020 European Aquatics Championships was held on 22 and 23 May 2021.

== Records ==
Before the competition, the existing world, European and championship records were as follows.

	Name	Nation	Time	Location	Date
World record	Regan Smith	United States	2:03.35	Gwangju	26 July 2019
European record	Anastasia Fesikova	Russia	2:04.94	Rome	1 August 2009
Championship record	Margherita Panziera	Italy	2:06.18	Glasgow	9 August 2018

The following new records were set during this competition.

Date	Event	Name	Nationality	Time	Record
23 May	Final	Margherita Panziera	Italy	2:06.08	CR

== Results ==
=== Heats ===
The heats were started on 22 May at 10:00.

Rank	Heat	Lane	Name	Nationality	Time	Notes
1	4	4	Margherita Panziera	Italy	2:08.52	Q
2	4	3	Lena Grabowski	Austria	2:09.12	Q, NR
3	3	4	Katalin Burián	Hungary	2:09.54	Q
4	3	5	Eszter Szabó-Feltóthy	Hungary	2:09.72	Q
5	2	2	Réka Nyirádi	Hungary	2:10.44	
6	3	7	Katie Shanahan	Great Britain	2:10.74	Q
7	2	1	Aviv Barzelay	Israel	2:11.60	Q
8	4	5	África Zamorano	Spain	2:11.98	Q
9	2	6	Cassie Wild	Great Britain	2:12.04	Q
10	3	1	Jenny Mensing	Germany	2:12.13	Q
11	2	4	Daryna Zevina	Ukraine	2:12.32	Q
12	3	3	Tatiana Salcuțan	Moldova	2:13.08	Q
13	4	1	Ugnė Mažutaitytė	Lithuania	2:13.26	Q
14	4	7	Ekaterina Avramova	Turkey	2:13.37	Q
15	2	3	Sonnele Öztürk	Germany	2:13.82	Q
16	2	7	Zuzanna Herasimowicz	Poland	2:13.96	Q
17	4	8	Aleksa Gold	Estonia	2:14.11	Q
18	4	6	Anastasiya Shkurdai	Belarus	2:14.29	
19	3	2	Gabriela Georgieva	Bulgaria	2:14.32	
20	3	6	Gerda Szilágyi	Hungary	2:14.36	
21	2	9	Ioanna Sacha	Greece	2:14.83	
22	4	0	Sudem Denizli	Turkey	2:15.22	
23	4	2	Nadine Lämmler	Germany	2:15.38	
24	2	8	Fanny Borer	Switzerland	2:15.74	
25	1	6	Tamara Potocká	Slovakia	2:16.13	
26	3	0	Ingeborg Løyning	Norway	2:16.45	
27	4	9	Karoline Sørensen	Denmark	2:17.12	
28	1	1	Lisa Nystrand	Sweden	2:17.50	
29	3	9	Marion Gregoire	Belgium	2:17.60	
30	1	4	Jade Smits	Belgium	2:18.34	
31	1	3	Janja Segel	Slovenia	2:18.43	
32	1	5	Signhild Joensen	Faroe Islands	2:18.50	
33	1	7	Emma Marušáková	Slovakia	2:20.80	
34	1	2	Mia Krstevska	North Macedonia	2:23.40	
35	1	8	Jona Beqiri	Kosovo	2:30.61	
	2	5	Laura Bernat	Poland	Disqualified	
	2	0	Nina Kost	Switzerland	Did not start	
	3	8	Paulina Peda	Poland	Did not start	

=== Semifinals ===
The semifinals were held on 22 May at 18:23.

==== Semifinal 1 ====
Rank	Lane	Name	Nationality	Time	Notes
1	4	Lena Grabowski	Austria	2:08.60	Q, NR
2	6	Cassie Wild	Great Britain	2:09.31	Q
3	5	Eszter Szabó-Feltóthy	Hungary	2:09.97	q
4	2	Daryna Zevina	Ukraine	2:11.73	q
5	1	Sonnele Öztürk	Germany	2:14.26	
6	3	Aviv Barzelay	Israel	2:14.63	
7	7	Ugnė Mažutaitytė	Lithuania	2:14.70	
8	8	Aleksa Gold	Estonia	2:15.17	

==== Semifinal 2 ====
Rank	Lane	Name	Nationality	Time	Notes
1	4	Margherita Panziera	Italy	2:07.61	Q
2	5	Katalin Burián	Hungary	2:08.89	Q
3	6	África Zamorano	Spain	2:09.89	q
4	3	Katie Shanahan	Great Britain	2:10.84	q
5	2	Jenny Mensing	Germany	2:12.17	
6	8	Zuzanna Herasimowicz	Poland	2:12.55	
7	1	Ekaterina Avramova	Turkey	2:12.96	
8	7	Tatiana Salcuțan	Moldova	2:13.10	

=== Final ===
The final was held on 23 May at 18:35.

Rank	Lane	Name	Nationality	Time	Notes
1st place, gold medalist(s)	4	Margherita Panziera	Italy	2:06.08	CR
2nd place, silver medalist(s)	6	Cassie Wild	Great Britain	2:07.74	
3rd place, bronze medalist(s)	3	Katalin Burián	Hungary	2:07.87	
4	5	Lena Grabowski	Austria	2:08.19	NR
5	2	África Zamorano	Spain	2:09.76	
6	1	Katie Shanahan	Great Britain	2:09.90	
7	7	Eszter Szabó-Feltóthy	Hungary	2:10.19	
8	8	Daryna Zevina	Ukraine	2:13.06	
