= Swimming at the 2020 European Aquatics Championships – Women's 100 metre backstroke =

Women's 100 metre backstroke at the 2020 European Aquatics Championships
- Venue: Danube Arena
- Dates: 20 May 2021 (heats and semifinals); 21 May 2021 (final)
- Competitors: 48 from 28 nations
- Winning time: 58.49

Medalists
gold medal	Kathleen Dawson	Great Britain
silver medal	Margherita Panziera	Italy
bronze medal	Maria Kameneva	Russia

The Women's 100 metre backstroke competition of the 2020 European Aquatics Championships was held on 20 and 21 May 2021.

== Records ==
Before the competition, the existing world, European and championship records were as follows.

	Name	Nation	Time	Location	Date
World record	Regan Smith	United States	57.57	Gwangju	28 July 2019
European record	Gemma Spofforth	Great Britain	58.12	Rome	28 July 2009
Championship record	Mie Nielsen	Denmark	58.73	London	19 May 2016

The following new records were set during this competition.

Date	Event	Name	Nationality	Time	Record
20 May	Semifinals	Kira Toussaint	Netherlands	58.73	CR
20 May	Semifinals	Kathleen Dawson	Great Britain	58.44	CR

== Results ==
=== Heats ===
The heats were started on 20 May at 10:55.

Rank	Heat	Lane	Name	Nationality	Time	Notes
1	6	4	Kathleen Dawson	Great Britain	59.32	Q
2	5	4	Kira Toussaint	Netherlands	59.57	Q
3	5	5	Maria Kameneva	Russia	59.74	Q
4	4	4	Margherita Panziera	Italy	59.94	Q
5	6	7	Anastasia Gorbenko	Israel	59.96	Q, NR
6	6	3	Cassie Wild	Great Britain	1:00.09	Q
7	6	2	Louise Hansson	Sweden	1:00.17	Q
8	4	3	Maaike de Waard	Netherlands	1:00.23	Q
9	4	5	Anastasia Fesikova	Russia	1:00.44	Q
10	6	6	Katalin Burián	Hungary	1:00.46	Q
11	6	5	Anastasiya Shkurdai	Belarus	1:00.54	Q
12	5	3	Simona Kubová	Czech Republic	1:00.56	Q
13	5	2	Ingeborg Løyning	Norway	1:00.71	Q
14	4	6	Paulina Peda	Poland	1:00.82	Q
15	4	7	Nina Kost	Switzerland	1:01.05	Q
16	5	7	Mimosa Jallow	Finland	1:01.11	QSO
16	6	8	África Zamorano	Spain	1:01.11	QSO
18	5	6	Silvia Scalia	Italy	1:01.12	
19	5	8	Ekaterina Avramova	Turkey	1:01.30	
20	5	0	Rafaela Azevedo	Portugal	1:01.32	
21	4	2	Carlotta Zofkova	Italy	1:01.45	
22	3	4	Theodora Drakou	Greece	1:01.51	
23	5	9	Jenny Mensing	Germany	1:01.52	
24	2	2	Tatiana Salcuțan	Moldova	1:01.64	
25	4	1	Klaudia Naziębło	Poland	1:01.77	
26	6	9	Lena Grabowski	Austria	1:01.82	
26	2	3	Fanny Teijonsalo	Finland	1:01.82	
28	3	3	Ugnė Mažutaitytė	Lithuania	1:01.93	
29	3	2	Eszter Szabó-Feltóthy	Hungary	1:01.99	
30	3	7	Sudem Denizli	Turkey	1:02.07	
30	4	8	Alicia Wilson	Great Britain	1:02.07	
32	4	0	Daryna Zevina	Ukraine	1:02.23	
33	5	1	Gerda Szilágyi	Hungary	1:02.28	
34	4	9	Aviv Barzelay	Israel	1:02.29	
35	3	9	Hanna Rosvall	Sweden	1:02.32	
36	3	1	Mireia Pradell	Spain	1:02.33	
37	3	5	Jade Smits	Belgium	1:02.56	
38	3	8	Sonnele Öztürk	Germany	1:02.94	
39	2	4	Laura Bernat	Poland	1:03.02	
40	6	0	Caroline Pilhatsch	Austria	1:03.05	
41	2	5	Janja Segel	Slovenia	1:03.19	
42	2	1	Ioanna Sacha	Greece	1:03.78	
43	2	8	Mia Blazevska Eminova	North Macedonia	1:04.59	
44	2	7	Signhild Joensen	Faroe Islands	1:04.72	
45	2	6	Emma Marušáková	Slovakia	1:05.26	
46	1	4	Mia Krstevska	North Macedonia	1:05.52	
47	1	5	Teresa Ivanová	Slovakia	1:05.76	
48	1	3	Jona Beqiri	Kosovo	1:10.98	
	2	0	Mónica Ramírez	Andorra	Did not start	
	3	0	Anastasiya Kuliashova	Belarus	Did not start	
	3	6	Panna Ugrai	Hungary	Did not start	
	6	1	Alicja Tchórz	Poland	Did not start	

==== Swim-off ====
The swim-off was held on 20 May at 12:20.

Rank	Lane	Name	Nationality	Time	Notes
1	5	Mimosa Jallow	Finland	1:00.31	Q
2	4	África Zamorano	Spain	1:01.16	

=== Semifinals ===
The semifinals were held on 20 May at 18:12.

==== Semifinal 1 ====
Rank	Lane	Name	Nationality	Time	Notes
1	4	Kira Toussaint	Netherlands	58.73	Q, =CR
2	5	Margherita Panziera	Italy	59.53	Q
3	3	Cassie Wild	Great Britain	59.75	q
4	6	Maaike de Waard	Netherlands	59.76	q
5	2	Katalin Burián	Hungary	1:00.18	
6	7	Simona Kubová	Czech Republic	1:00.43	
7	1	Paulina Peda	Poland	1:00.59	
8	8	Mimosa Jallow	Finland	1:00.82	

==== Semifinal 2 ====
Rank	Lane	Name	Nationality	Time	Notes
1	4	Kathleen Dawson	Great Britain	58.44	Q, CR
2	5	Maria Kameneva	Russia	59.30	Q
3	3	Anastasia Gorbenko	Israel	59.78	q, WD, NR
4	2	Anastasia Fesikova	Russia	1:00.00	q
5	6	Louise Hansson	Sweden	1:00.04	q
6	1	Ingeborg Løyning	Norway	1:00.23	NR
7	8	Nina Kost	Switzerland	1:00.35	
8	7	Anastasiya Shkurdai	Belarus	1:00.52	

=== Final ===
==== First race ====
The final was held on 21 May at 18:24. The race was then declared void after the Swedish protested that the speaker in lane 1 malfunctioned and Hansson was not able to hear the starting gun. A re-race was scheduled for 20:45.

Rank	Lane	Name	Nationality	Time	Notes
	4	Kathleen Dawson	Great Britain	58.18	CR
	5	Kira Toussaint	Netherlands	59.02	
	3	Maria Kameneva	Russia	59.13	
	6	Margherita Panziera	Italy	59.65	
	2	Cassie Wild	Great Britain	59.82	
	7	Maaike de Waard	Netherlands	1:00.33	
	8	Anastasia Fesikova	Russia	1:00.33	
	1	Louise Hansson	Sweden	1:02.29	

==== Re race ====
The final re race was held on 21 May at 20:45.

Rank	Lane	Name	Nationality	Time	Notes
1st place, gold medalist(s)	4	Kathleen Dawson	Great Britain	58.49	
2nd place, silver medalist(s)	6	Margherita Panziera	Italy	59.01	
3rd place, bronze medalist(s)	3	Maria Kameneva	Russia	59.22	
4	5	Kira Toussaint	Netherlands	59.32	
5	2	Cassie Wild	Great Britain	59.68	
6	1	Louise Hansson	Sweden	1:00.04	
7	8	Anastasia Fesikova	Russia	1:00.33	
8	7	Maaike de Waard	Netherlands	1:00.64	
