= Swimming at the 2020 European Aquatics Championships – Women's 50 metre backstroke =

Women's 50 metre backstroke at the 2020 European Aquatics Championships
- Venue: Danube Arena
- Dates: 18 May 2021 (heats and semifinals); 19 May 2021 (final)
- Competitors: 54 from 34 nations
- Winning time: 27.36

Medalists
gold medal	Kira Toussaint	Netherlands
silver medal	Kathleen Dawson	Great Britain
bronze medal	Maaike de Waard	Netherlands

The Women's 50 metre backstroke competition of the 2020 European Aquatics Championships was held on 18 and 19 May 2021.

== Records ==
Before the competition, the existing world, European and championship records were as follows.

	Name	Nationality	Time	Location	Date
World record	Liu Xiang	China	26.98	Jakarta	21 August 2018
European record	Kira Toussaint	Netherlands	27.10	Eindhoven	10 April 2021
Championship record	Georgia Davies	Great Britain	27.21	Glasgow	4 August 2018

The following new records were set during this competition.

Date	Event	Name	Nationality	Time	Record
18 May	Semifinals	Kathleen Dawson	Great Britain	27.19	CR

== Results ==
=== Heats ===
The heats were started on 18 May at 10:47.

Rank	Heat	Lane	Name	Nationality	Time	Notes
1	6	6	Kathleen Dawson	Great Britain	27.29	Q
2	6	4	Kira Toussaint	Netherlands	27.60	Q
3	4	4	Maaike de Waard	Netherlands	27.84	Q
4	5	4	Anastasia Fesikova	Russia	27.86	Q
5	6	3	Mimosa Jallow	Finland	27.97	Q
6	6	5	Caroline Pilhatsch	Austria	28.02	Q
7	6	7	Ingeborg Løyning	Norway	28.05	Q, NR
7	4	3	Alicja Tchórz	Poland	28.05	Q
9	5	2	Cassie Wild	Great Britain	28.11	Q
10	5	6	Nina Kost	Switzerland	28.27	Q
11	5	5	Silvia Scalia	Italy	28.28	Q
12	4	5	Simona Kubová	Czech Republic	28.30	Q
13	6	2	Margherita Panziera	Italy	28.31	Q
14	4	2	Anastasiya Shkurdai	Belarus	28.33	Q
15	4	7	Theodora Drakou	Greece	28.39	Q
16	5	3	Julie Kepp Jensen	Denmark	28.40	Q
17	6	1	Tessa Giele	Netherlands	28.44	
18	5	7	Rafaela Azevedo	Portugal	28.46	
19	6	8	Katalin Burián	Hungary	28.47	
20	3	2	Ekaterina Avramova	Turkey	28.57	
21	4	6	Costanza Cocconcelli	Italy	28.60	
22	5	8	Fanny Teijonsalo	Finland	28.64	
23	4	8	Mireia Pradell	Spain	28.69	
24	4	0	Hanna Rosvall	Sweden	28.73	
25	5	9	Nina Stanisavljević	Serbia	28.78	NR
26	5	0	Anastasiya Kuliashova	Belarus	28.79	
27	5	1	Carlotta Zofkova	Italy	28.83	
28	6	0	Jade Smits	Belgium	28.85	
29	2	7	Selen Özbilen	Turkey	28.96	
30	6	9	Ugnė Mažutaitytė	Lithuania	29.05	
31	4	9	Sara Junevik	Sweden	29.16	
32	3	9	Janja Segel	Slovenia	29.21	
33	3	3	Lena Grabowski	Austria	29.24	
33	4	1	Nadine Lämmler	Germany	29.24	
35	2	3	Tatiana Salcuțan	Moldova	29.27	NR
36	3	5	Zuzanna Herasimowicz	Poland	29.32	
37	3	7	Jenny Mensing	Germany	29.37	
38	3	6	Gerda Szilágyi	Hungary	29.39	
39	3	1	Aviv Barzelay	Israel	29.42	
40	2	4	Steingerður Hauksdóttir	Iceland	29.43	
41	2	8	Eszter Szabó-Feltóthy	Hungary	29.70	
42	1	4	Teresa Ivanová	Slovakia	29.84	
43	2	5	Signhild Joensen	Faroe Islands	29.89	
44	2	2	Tamara Potocká	Slovakia	29.93	
45	2	0	Ida Liljeqvist	Sweden	29.96	
46	1	2	Ieva Maļuka	Latvia	30.00	
47	3	0	Gabriela Georgieva	Bulgaria	30.05	
48	2	6	Laura Bernat	Poland	30.14	
49	3	8	Emma Marušáková	Slovakia	30.71	
50	2	9	Mia Blazevska Eminova	North Macedonia	30.77	
51	1	5	Nicola Muscat	Malta	30.96	
52	1	3	Eda Zeqiri	Kosovo	31.29	
53	1	6	Jona Beqiri	Kosovo	32.31	
	2	1	Mónica Ramírez	Andorra	Disqualified	
	3	4	Panna Ugrai	Hungary	Did not start	

=== Semifinals ===
The semifinals were held on 18 May at 18:49.

==== Semifinal 1 ====
Rank	Lane	Name	Nationality	Time	Notes
1	4	Kira Toussaint	Netherlands	27.22	Q
2	5	Anastasia Fesikova	Russia	27.69	Q
3	3	Caroline Pilhatsch	Austria	27.81	q
4	8	Julie Kepp Jensen	Denmark	28.01	qSO
5	6	Ingeborg Løyning	Norway	28.06	
6	2	Nina Kost	Switzerland	28.30	
7	7	Simona Kubová	Czech Republic	28.52	
8	1	Anastasiya Shkurdai	Belarus	29.16	

==== Semifinal 2 ====
Rank	Lane	Name	Nationality	Time	Notes
1	4	Kathleen Dawson	Great Britain	27.19	Q, CR, NR
2	5	Maaike de Waard	Netherlands	27.69	Q
3	3	Mimosa Jallow	Finland	27.93	q
4	2	Cassie Wild	Great Britain	27.98	q
5	6	Alicja Tchórz	Poland	28.01	qSO
6	1	Margherita Panziera	Italy	28.04	
7	7	Silvia Scalia	Italy	28.24	
8	8	Theodora Drakou	Greece	28.46	

==== Swim-off ====
The swim-off was held on 18 May at 20:01.

Rank	Lane	Name	Nationality	Time	Notes
1	4	Julie Kepp Jensen	Denmark	28.01	q
2	5	Alicja Tchórz	Poland	28.20	

=== Final ===
The final was held on 19 May at 19:18.

Rank	Lane	Name	Nationality	Time	Notes
1st place, gold medalist(s)	5	Kira Toussaint	Netherlands	27.36	
2nd place, silver medalist(s)	4	Kathleen Dawson	Great Britain	27.46	
3rd place, bronze medalist(s)	6	Maaike de Waard	Netherlands	27.74	
4	1	Cassie Wild	Great Britain	27.85	
5	3	Anastasia Fesikova	Russia	27.90	
6	8	Julie Kepp Jensen	Denmark	28.01	
7	7	Mimosa Jallow	Finland	28.16	
	2	Caroline Pilhatsch	Austria	Disqualified	
