= Swimming at the 2022 European Aquatics Championships – Women's 200 metre backstroke =

Women's 200 metre backstroke at the 2022 European Aquatics Championships
- Venue: Foro Italico
- Dates: 11 August (heats and semifinals); 12 August (final)
- Competitors: 25 from 18 nations
- Winning time: 2:07.13

Medalists
gold medal	Margherita Panziera	Italy
silver medal	Katie Shanahan	Great Britain
bronze medal	Dóra Molnár	Hungary

The Women's 200 metre backstroke competition of the 2022 European Aquatics Championships was held on 11 and 12 August 2022.

== Records ==
Prior the competition, the existing world, European and championship records were as follows.

	Name	Nation	Time	Location	Date
World record	Regan Smith	United States	2:03.35	Gwangju	26 July 2019
European record	Anastasia Fesikova	Russia	2:04.94	Rome	1 August 2009
Championship record	Margherita Panziera	Italy	2:06.08	Budapest	23 May 2021

== Results ==
=== Heats ===
The heats were started on 11 August at 09:44.

Rank	Heat	Lane	Name	Nationality	Time	Notes
1	3	4	Margherita Panziera	Italy	2:09.27	Q
2	1	4	Dóra Molnár	Hungary	2:09.53	Q
3	3	5	Eszter Szabó-Feltóthy	Hungary	2:10.17	Q
4	3	3	Katie Shanahan	Great Britain	2:10.93	Q
5	3	2	Pauline Mahieu	France	2:11.36	Q
6	1	3	Camila Rebelo	Portugal	2:12.10	Q
7	1	5	África Zamorano	Spain	2:12.22	Q
8	2	6	Réka Nyirádi	Hungary	2:12.42	
9	1	2	Carmen Weiler	Spain	2:12.44	Q
10	3	8	Gabriela Georgieva	Bulgaria	2:12.46	Q
11	1	6	Anastasya Gorbenko	Israel	2:12.94	Q
12	3	6	Aviv Barzelay	Israel	2:12.95	Q
13	2	4	Lena Grabowski	Austria	2:13.00	Q
14	2	5	Federica Toma	Italy	2:13.13	Q
15	1	1	Sonnele Öztürk	Germany	2:13.18	Q
16	2	3	Laura Bernat	Poland	2:13.30	Q
17	2	2	Emma Terebo	France	2:13.89	Q
18	1	7	Daryna Zevina	Ukraine	2:13.91	
19	2	1	Lotte Hosper	Netherlands	2:14.65	
20	3	1	Nina Kost	Switzerland	2:15.19	
21	3	7	Ingeborg Løyning	Norway	2:15.40	
22	2	8	Fanny Borer	Switzerland	2:15.60	
23	1	8	Karoline Sørensen	Denmark	2:15.70	
24	2	7	Aleksa Gold	Estonia	2:15.74	
25	3	0	Lisa Nystrand	Sweden	2:17.84	

=== Semifinals ===
The semifinals were started at 18:25.

Rank	Heat	Lane	Name	Nationality	Time	Notes
1	2	4	Margherita Panziera	Italy	2:08.18	Q
2	2	5	Eszter Szabó-Feltóthy	Hungary	2:09.80	Q
3	1	5	Katie Shanahan	Great Britain	2:09.82	Q
4	1	4	Dóra Molnár	Hungary	2:09.88	Q
5	2	8	Laura Bernat	Poland	2:10.15	q
6	1	7	Lena Grabowski	Austria	2:10.78	q
7	1	3	Camila Rebelo	Portugal	2:11.05	q
8	2	6	África Zamorano	Spain	2:11.07	q
9	1	8	Emma Terebo	France	2:11.16	
10	2	3	Pauline Mahieu	France	2:11.38	
11	1	2	Anastasya Gorbenko	Israel	2:11.46	
12	1	6	Carmen Weiler	Spain	2:11.78	
13	2	7	Aviv Barzelay	Israel	2:11.84	
14	2	2	Gabriela Georgieva	Bulgaria	2:12.54	
15	1	1	Sonnele Öztürk	Germany	2:13.97	
16	2	1	Federica Toma	Italy	2:15.74	

=== Final ===
The final was held at 18:00.

Rank	Lane	Name	Nationality	Time	Notes
1st place, gold medalist(s)	4	Margherita Panziera	Italy	2:07.13	
2nd place, silver medalist(s)	3	Katie Shanahan	Great Britain	2:09.26	
3rd place, bronze medalist(s)	6	Dóra Molnár	Hungary	2:09.73	
4	5	Eszter Szabó-Feltóthy	Hungary	2:10.23	
5	1	Camila Rebelo	Portugal	2:11.03	
6	8	África Zamorano	Spain	2:11.11	
7	2	Laura Bernat	Poland	2:11.14	
8	7	Lena Grabowski	Austria	2:11.23	
