= Swimming at the 2019 World Aquatics Championships – Women's 200 metre backstroke =

Women's 200 metre backstroke at the 2019 World Aquatics Championships
- Venue: Nambu University Municipal Aquatics Center
- Location: Gwangju, South Korea
- Dates: 26 July 2019 (heats and semifinals); 27 July 2019 (final)
- Competitors: 42 from 35 nations
- Winning time: 2:03.69

Medalists
gold medal	Regan Smith	United States
silver medal	Kaylee McKeown	Australia
bronze medal	Kylie Masse	Canada

The Women's 200 metre backstroke competition at the 2019 World Championships was held on 26 and 27 July 2019.

== Records ==
Prior to the competition, the existing world and championship records were as follows.

World record	Missy Franklin (USA)	2:04.06	London, United Kingdom	3 August 2012
Competition record	Missy Franklin (USA)	2:04.76	Barcelona, Spain	3 August 2013

The following new records were set during this competition.

Date	Event	Name	Nationality	Time	Record
26 July	Semifinal	Regan Smith	United States	2:03.35	WR

== Results ==
=== Heats ===
The heats were held on 26 July at 10:23.

Rank	Heat	Lane	Name	Nationality	Time	Notes
1	3	5	Regan Smith	United States	2:06.01	Q, WJ
2	4	3	Katinka Hosszú	Hungary	2:08.34	Q
3	5	4	Margherita Panziera	Italy	2:08.51	Q
4	5	5	Kaylee McKeown	Australia	2:09.17	Q
5	4	4	Kylie Masse	Canada	2:09.18	Q
6	5	3	Minna Atherton	Australia	2:09.32	Q
7	5	6	Katalin Burián	Hungary	2:09.70	Q
8	5	1	Ali Galyer	New Zealand	2:09.98	Q
9	3	4	Kathleen Baker	United States	2:10.08	Q
10	4	1	Tatiana Salcuțan	Moldova	2:10.29	Q
11	4	2	Anastasia Avdeeva	Russia	2:10.34	Q
12	4	6	Natsumi Sakai	Japan	2:10.40	Q
13	5	7	África Zamorano	Spain	2:10.50	Q
14	4	5	Taylor Ruck	Canada	2:10.67	Q
15	3	6	Liu Yaxin	China	2:10.72	Q
16	3	7	Jessica Fullalove	Great Britain	2:11.08	Q
17	3	1	Lena Grabowski	Austria	2:11.16	
17	4	0	Gabriela Georgieva	Bulgaria	2:11.16	
19	3	8	Simona Kubová	Czech Republic	2:11.29	
20	3	2	Im Da-sol	South Korea	2:11.33	
21	4	8	Zuzanna Herasimowicz	Poland	2:11.57	
22	4	7	Peng Xuwei	China	2:12.41	
23	3	3	Daria Ustinova	Russia	2:12.64	
24	5	9	Ingeborg Løyning	Norway	2:13.25	NR
25	2	5	Maria Ugolkova	Switzerland	2:13.26	NR
26	5	8	Nathania van Niekerk	South Africa	2:13.37	
27	2	6	Kristina Steina	Latvia	2:14.00	NR
28	5	0	Ekaterina Avramova	Turkey	2:14.15	
29	4	9	Ugnė Mažutaitytė	Lithuania	2:14.46	
30	2	2	Felicity Passon	Seychelles	2:14.60	
31	5	2	Rio Shirai	Japan	2:14.98	
32	3	0	Aleksa Gold	Estonia	2:15.24	
33	3	9	Ana Herceg	Croatia	2:16.29	
34	2	3	Signhild Joensen	Faroe Islands	2:17.30	
35	2	4	Toto Wong	Hong Kong	2:17.57	
36	2	7	Elizaveta Rogozhnikova	Kyrgyzstan	2:20.55	
37	1	4	Mia Krstevska	North Macedonia	2:23.13	
38	2	8	Danielle Titus	Barbados	2:25.13	
39	2	0	Eda Zeqiri	Kosovo	2:27.11	
40	1	5	Claudia Verdino	Monaco	2:27.35	
41	2	1	Camille Koenig	Mauritius	2:28.32	
42	1	3	Idealy Tendrinavalona	Madagascar	2:29.80	

=== Semifinals ===
The semifinals were held on 26 July at 20:20.

==== Semifinal 1 ====
Rank	Lane	Name	Nationality	Time	Notes
1	3	Minna Atherton	Australia	2:07.38	Q
2	4	Katinka Hosszú	Hungary	2:07.48	Q
3	5	Kaylee McKeown	Australia	2:08.19	Q
4	1	Taylor Ruck	Canada	2:08.42	Q
5	7	Natsumi Sakai	Japan	2:10.11	
6	6	Ali Galyer	New Zealand	2:10.19	
7	2	Tatiana Salcuțan	Moldova	2:10.82	
8	8	Jessica Fullalove	Great Britain	2:11.12	

==== Semifinal 2 ====
Rank	Lane	Name	Nationality	Time	Notes
1	4	Regan Smith	United States	2:03.35	Q, WR, WJ
2	3	Kylie Masse	Canada	2:06.57	Q
3	5	Margherita Panziera	Italy	2:06.62	Q
4	6	Katalin Burián	Hungary	2:09.40	Q
5	2	Kathleen Baker	United States	2:09.68	
6	7	Anastasia Avdeeva	Russia	2:09.78	
7	1	África Zamorano	Spain	2:10.54	
8	8	Liu Yaxin	China	2:12.93	

=== Final ===
The final was started on 27 July at 20:58.

Rank	Lane	Name	Nationality	Time	Notes
1st place, gold medalist(s)	4	Regan Smith	United States	2:03.69	
2nd place, silver medalist(s)	7	Kaylee McKeown	Australia	2:06.26	
3rd place, bronze medalist(s)	5	Kylie Masse	Canada	2:06.62	
4	3	Margherita Panziera	Italy	2:06.67	
5	1	Taylor Ruck	Canada	2:07.50	
6	6	Minna Atherton	Australia	2:08.26	
7	8	Katalin Burián	Hungary	2:08.65	
8	2	Katinka Hosszú	Hungary	2:10.08	
