= Swimming at the 2020 Summer Olympics – Women's 100 metre backstroke =

Women's 100 metre backstroke at the Games of the XXXII Olympiad
- Venue: Tokyo Aquatics Centre
- Dates: 25 July 2021 (heats); 26 July 2021 (semifinals); 27 July 2021 (final)
- Competitors: 41 from 34 nations
- Winning time: 57.47

Medalists
1st place, gold medalist(s)		Kaylee McKeown	Australia
2nd place, silver medalist(s)		Kylie Masse	Canada
3rd place, bronze medalist(s)		Regan Smith	United States

The women's 100 metre backstroke event at the 2020 Summer Olympics was held from 25 to 27 July 2021 at the Tokyo Aquatics Centre. It was the event's twenty-third consecutive appearance, having been held at every edition since 1924. An unusual occurrence happened where the Olympic record for this event was broken three times in a single day and five times through the course of the entire competition.

== Summary ==
Australia's world record holder Kaylee McKeown broke the Olympic record to win her first individual Olympic title in 57.47, just 0.02 seconds off her world record. Third at the turn, McKeown used a blistering back half to overtake the field and become Australia's first Olympic champion in this event. While Canada's defending Bronze medallist Kylie Masse led at the halfway mark, she could not withstand McKeown's late charge, touching for silver in 57.72 - only 0.02 seconds off her national record. U.S.' previous world record holder Regan Smith was unable to replicate her time from the heats and semi-finals, settling for bronze in 58.05. Though Smith's teammate Rhyan White (58.43) was second at the turn, she would fade over the final 50 m to take fourth place. Australia's Emily Seebohm (58.45), the 2012 silver medallist, was out-touched by 0.02 seconds to finish fifth.

Meanwhile, Great Britain's Kathleen Dawson could not repeat her stunning 58.01 swim from the European Championships months earlier, placing sixth. Dutch record holder Kira Toussaint also missed her national record from the Eindhoven Qualification Meet to take sixth. Israel's Anastasia Gorbenko came eight in 59.90, missing her personal best time from the semi-finals by 6 tenths of a second.

== Records ==
Prior to this competition, the existing world and Olympic records were as follows.

World record	Kaylee McKeown (AUS)	57.45	Adelaide, Australia	13 June 2021
Olympic record	Emily Seebohm (AUS)	58.23	London, United Kingdom	29 July 2012

The following records were established during the competition:

Date	Event	Swimmer	Nation	Time	Record
July 25	Heat 4	Kylie Masse	Canada	58.17	OR
July 25	Heat 5	Regan Smith	United States	57.96	OR
July 25	Heat 6	Kaylee McKeown	Australia	57.88	OR
July 26	Semifinal 1	Regan Smith	United States	57.86	OR
July 27	Final	Kaylee McKeown	Australia	57.47	OR

== Qualification ==
The Olympic Qualifying Time for the event was 1:00.25. Up to two swimmers per National Olympic Committee (NOC) could automatically qualify by swimming that time at an approved qualification event. The Olympic Selection Time was 1:02.06. Up to one swimmer per NOC meeting that time was eligible for selection, allocated by world ranking until the maximum quota for all swimming events is reached. NOCs without a female swimmer qualified in any event could also use their universality place.

== Competition format ==
The competition consisted of three rounds: heats, semifinals, and a final. The swimmers with the best 16 times in the heats advanced to the semifinals. The swimmers with the best 8 times in the semifinals advanced to the final.

== Schedule ==
All times are Japan Standard Time (UTC+9)

Date	Time	Round
25 July 2021	19:00	Heats
26 July 2021	11:53	Semifinals
27 July 2021	10:51	Final

== Results ==
=== Heats ===
The swimmers with the top 16 times, regardless of heat, advanced to the semifinals.

Rank	Heat	Lane	Swimmer	Nation	Time	Notes
1	6	4	Kaylee McKeown	Australia	57.88	Q, OR
2	5	4	Regan Smith	United States	57.96	Q
3	4	4	Kylie Masse	Canada	58.17	Q
4	6	5	Kathleen Dawson	Great Britain	58.69	Q
5	6	3	Emily Seebohm	Australia	58.86	Q
6	5	5	Rhyan White	United States	59.02	Q
7	5	3	Kira Toussaint	Netherlands	59.21	Q
8	4	3	Margherita Panziera	Italy	59.74	Q
9	5	1	Peng Xuwei	China	59.78	Q
10	5	6	Maria Kameneva	ROC	59.88	Q
11	4	5	Taylor Ruck	Canada	59.89	Q
12	4	7	Anastasia Gorbenko	Israel	59.90	Q
13	4	6	Anastasia Fesikova	ROC	59.92	Q
14	6	2	Cassie Wild	Great Britain	59.99	Q
15	5	7	Maaike de Waard	Netherlands	1:00.03	Q
16	4	1	Anna Konishi	Japan	1:00.04	Q
17	3	2	Mimosa Jallow	Finland	1:00.06	NR
18	5	8	Katalin Burián	Hungary	1:00.07	
18	6	8	Ingeborg Løyning	Norway	1:00.07	
20	4	8	Lee Eun-ji	South Korea	1:00.14	
21	5	2	Michelle Coleman	Sweden	1:00.54	
22	6	7	Chen Jie	China	1:00.63	
23	3	5	Béryl Gastaldello	France	1:00.69	
24	6	1	Laura Riedemann	Germany	1:00.81	
25	3	3	Danielle Hill	Ireland	1:00.86	
26	3	6	Stephanie Au	Hong Kong	1:01.07	
27	4	2	Simona Kubová	Czech Republic	1:01.35	
28	2	5	Tatiana Salcuțan	Moldova	1:01.59	
29	3	8	Lena Grabowski	Austria	1:01.80	
30	3	1	Daryna Zevina	Ukraine	1:01.97	
31	2	7	McKenna DeBever	Peru	1:02.09	NR
32	3	7	Isabella Arcila	Colombia	1:02.28	
33	2	4	Ali Galyer	New Zealand	1:02.65	
34	1	5	Donata Katai	Zimbabwe	1:02.73	
35	2	6	Krystal Lara	Dominican Republic	1:03.07	
36	2	3	Celina Márquez	El Salvador	1:03.75	
37	2	1	Danielle Titus	Barbados	1:04.53	
38	2	2	Felicity Passon	Seychelles	1:04.66	
39	1	4	Maana Patel	India	1:05.20	
40	2	8	Diana Nazarova	Kazakhstan	1:06.99	
41	1	3	Kimberly Ince	Grenada	1:10.24	
—	3	4	Louise Hansson	Sweden	DNS	
—	6	6	Anastasiya Shkurdai	Belarus	DNS	

=== Semifinals ===
The swimmers with the best 8 times, regardless of heat, advanced to the final.

Rank	Heat	Lane	Swimmer	Nation	Time	Notes
1	1	4	Regan Smith	United States	57.86	Q, OR
2	2	5	Kylie Masse	Canada	58.09	Q
3	2	4	Kaylee McKeown	Australia	58.11	Q
4	1	3	Rhyan White	United States	58.46	Q
5	1	5	Kathleen Dawson	Great Britain	58.56	Q
6	2	3	Emily Seebohm	Australia	58.59	Q
7	2	6	Kira Toussaint	Netherlands	59.09	Q
8	1	7	Anastasia Gorbenko	Israel	59.30	Q, NR
9	2	7	Taylor Ruck	Canada	59.45	
10	1	2	Maria Kameneva	ROC	59.49	
11	1	6	Margherita Panziera	Italy	59.75	
12	2	2	Peng Xuwei	China	59.98	
13	1	8	Anna Konishi	Japan	1:00.07	
14	1	1	Cassie Wild	Great Britain	1:00.20	
14	2	1	Anastasia Fesikova	ROC	1:00.20	
16	2	8	Maaike de Waard	Netherlands	1:00.49	

=== Final ===
Rank	Lane	Swimmer	Nation	Time	Notes
1st place, gold medalist(s)	3	Kaylee McKeown	Australia	57.47	OR
2nd place, silver medalist(s)	5	Kylie Masse	Canada	57.72	
3rd place, bronze medalist(s)	4	Regan Smith	United States	58.05	
4	6	Rhyan White	United States	58.43	
5	7	Emily Seebohm	Australia	58.45	
6	2	Kathleen Dawson	Great Britain	58.70	
7	1	Kira Toussaint	Netherlands	59.11	
8	8	Anastasia Gorbenko	Israel	59.53	
