= Swimming at the 2018 European Aquatics Championships – Women's 50 metre backstroke =

Women's 50 metre backstroke at the 2018 European Aquatics Championships
- Venue: Tollcross International Swimming Centre
- Dates: 4 August (heats and semifinals); 5 August (final)
- Competitors: 51 from 25 nations
- Winning time: 27.23

Medalists
gold medal	Georgia Davies	Great Britain
silver medal	Anastasia Fesikova	Russia
bronze medal	Mimosa Jallow	Finland

The Women's 50 metre backstroke competition of the 2018 European Aquatics Championships was held on 4 and 5 August 2018.

== Records ==
Prior to the competition, the existing world and championship records were as follows.

	Name	Nation	Time	Location	Date
World record	Zhao Jing	China	27.06	Rome	30 July 2009
European record	Daniela Samulski; Aliaksandra Herasimenia	Germany; Belarus	27.23	Rome; Budapest	30 July 2009; 27 July 2017
Championship record	Francesca Halsall	Great Britain	27.57	London	21 May 2016

The following new records were set during this competition.

Date	Event	Name	Nationality	Time	Record
4 August	Heat	Georgia Davies	Great Britain	27.21	CR, ER

== Results ==
=== Heats ===
The heats were started on 4 August at 10:17.

Rank	Heat	Lane	Name	Nationality	Time	Notes
1	5	4	Georgia Davies	Great Britain	27.21	Q, ER, CR
2	6	4	Anastasia Fesikova	Russia	27.23	Q, NR
3	5	5	Mimosa Jallow	Finland	27.42	Q, NR
4	6	5	Maria Kameneva	Russia	27.70	Q, WD
5	4	5	Simona Baumrtová	Czech Republic	27.78	Q, NR
6	4	6	Kathleen Dawson	Great Britain	27.92	Q
7	4	4	Mie Nielsen	Denmark	27.97	Q
8	5	6	Kira Toussaint	Netherlands	28.04	Q
9	6	3	Béryl Gastaldello	France	28.19	Q
10	6	6	Ida Lindborg	Sweden	28.23	Q
11	4	3	Maaike de Waard	Netherlands	28.30	Q
11	5	7	Cassie Wild	Great Britain	28.30	
13	4	2	Alicja Tchórz	Poland	28.33	Q
14	6	8	Tessa Vermeulen	Netherlands	28.35	
15	5	3	Silvia Scalia	Italy	28.37	Q
15	6	2	Julie Kepp Jensen	Denmark	28.37	Q
17	3	4	Sasha Touretski	Switzerland	28.46	Q, NR
18	5	1	Carlotta Zofkova	Italy	28.48	Q
19	5	2	Theodora Drakou	Greece	28.53	Q
20	4	7	Lucy Hope	Great Britain	28.61	
21	4	1	Polina Egorova	Russia	28.65	
22	6	1	Mathilde Cini	France	28.66	
23	5	9	Nina Kost	Switzerland	28.72	
24	5	8	Jenna Laukkanen	Finland	28.85	
25	6	9	Katalin Burián	Hungary	28.94	
26	3	5	Victoria Bierre	Denmark	29.04	
27	6	0	Anastasiia Abdeeva	Russia	29.08	
28	4	9	Anika Apostalon	Czech Republic	29.22	
29	4	0	Ekaterina Avramova	Turkey	29.27	
30	4	8	Agata Naskręt	Poland	29.38	
31	2	4	Signhild Joensen	Faroe Islands	29.54	
32	3	6	Gabriela Georgieva	Bulgaria	29.58	
33	5	0	Karolina Hájková	Slovakia	29.61	
34	3	3	Shahar Menahem	Israel	29.66	
35	2	5	Elçin Türkmenoğlu	Turkey	29.71	
36	3	8	Magdalena Kuras	Sweden	29.91	
37	3	7	Eygló Ósk Gústafsdóttir	Iceland	29.93	
38	3	0	Ieva Maļuka	Latvia	29.94	
39	3	9	Margaret Markvardt	Estonia	29.96	
40	2	7	Aviv Barzelay	Israel	30.01	
41	3	2	Arina Baikova	Latvia	30.02	
42	2	6	Lena Grabowski	Austria	30.03	
43	2	8	Vilma Ruotsalainen	Finland	30.04	
44	2	2	Kertu Kaare	Estonia	30.23	
45	3	1	Sezin Eliguel	Turkey	30.25	
46	2	1	Weronika Górecka	Poland	30.60	
47	1	5	Eda Zećiri	Kosovo	30.95	
48	1	4	Fjorda Šabani	Kosovo	31.17	
49	1	3	Ani Poghosyan	Armenia	33.05	
—	2	3	Kalia Antoniou	Cyprus	Disqualified	
—	6	7	Caroline Pilhatsch	Austria	Disqualified	

=== Semifinals ===
The semifinals were held on 4 August at 17:49.

==== Semifinal 1 ====
Rank	Lane	Name	Nationality	Time	Notes
1	4	Anastasia Fesikova	Russia	27.49	Q
2	6	Béryl Gastaldello	France	27.86	Q, NR
3	5	Simona Baumrtová	Czech Republic	27.91	Q
4	7	Silvia Scalia	Italy	27.96	
5	8	Theodora Drakou	Greece	28.08	
6	2	Maaike de Waard	Netherlands	28.09	
7	3	Mie Nielsen	Denmark	28.14	
8	1	Sasha Touretski	Switzerland	28.70	

==== Semifinal 2 ====
Rank	Lane	Name	Nationality	Time	Notes
1	4	Georgia Davies	Great Britain	27.46	Q
2	5	Mimosa Jallow	Finland	27.62	Q
3	7	Alicja Tchórz	Poland	27.72	Q, NR
4	6	Kira Toussaint	Netherlands	27.92	Q
5	8	Carlotta Zofkova	Italy	27.94	Q, NR
6	3	Kathleen Dawson	Great Britain	28.11	
7	1	Julie Kepp Jensen	Denmark	28.32	
8	2	Ida Lindborg	Sweden	28.77	

=== Final ===
The final was held on 5 August at 18:21.

Rank	Lane	Name	Nationality	Time	Notes
1st place, gold medalist(s)	4	Georgia Davies	Great Britain	27.23	
2nd place, silver medalist(s)	5	Anastasia Fesikova	Russia	27.31	
3rd place, bronze medalist(s)	3	Mimosa Jallow	Finland	27.70	
4	6	Alicja Tchórz	Poland	27.74	
5	2	Béryl Gastaldello	France	28.10	
6	8	Carlotta Zofkova	Italy	28.31	
7	7	Simona Baumrtová	Czech Republic	28.38	
8	1	Kira Toussaint	Netherlands	28.80	
