= Swimming at the 2024 Summer Olympics – Women's 200-metre backstroke =

Women's 200-metre backstroke at the Games of the XXXIII Olympiad
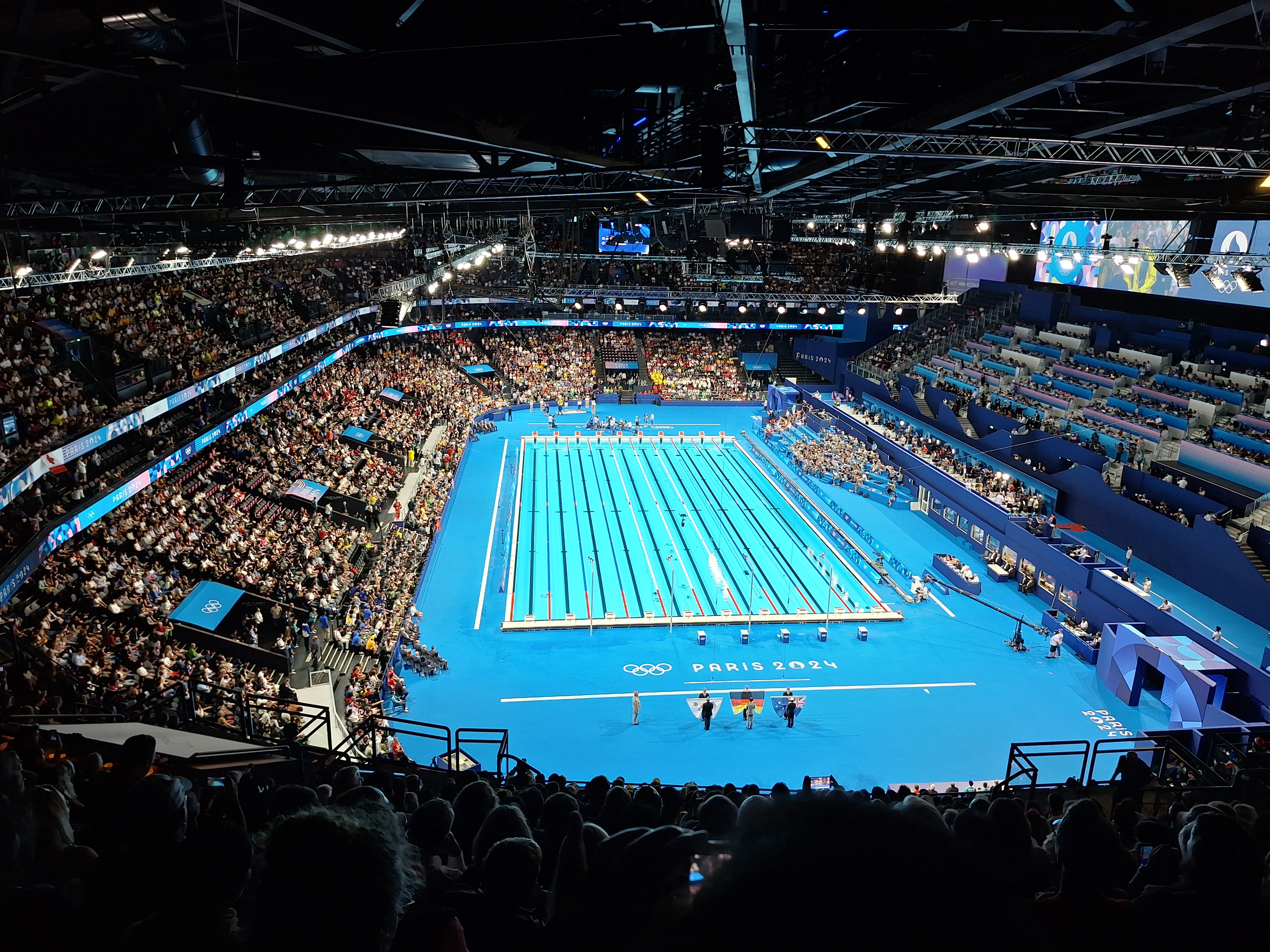
- Paris La Défense Arena after it was converted to a swimming pool for the swimming events
- Venue: Paris La Défense Arena
- Dates: 1 August 2024 (heats and semifinals); 2 August 2024 (final)
- Competitors: 27 from 18 nations
- Winning time: 2:03.73

Medalists
1st place, gold medalist(s)		Kaylee McKeown	Australia
2nd place, silver medalist(s)		Regan Smith	United States
3rd place, bronze medalist(s)		Kylie Masse	Canada

The women's 200-metre backstroke event at the 2024 Summer Olympics was held from 1 to 2 August 2024 at Paris La Défense Arena, which was converted to a swimming pool for the swimming events.

Australia's defending Olympic champion Kaylee McKeown and the US' Regan Smith were the favourites to win the event, with other contenders including Canada's Kylie Masse and the US' Phoebe Bacon. All four of those progressed through the heats and semifinals to qualify for the final.

McKeown won the final with a new Olympic record of 2:03.73, making her the first female athlete to win both backstroke events at consecutive Olympics, and the first Australian athlete to win four individual gold medals. Smith finished second with 2:04.26 and Masse finished third with 2:05.57, 0.04 seconds ahead of Bacon in fourth.

== Background ==
Prior to the event, the world record was 2:03.14, set by defending champion Kaylee McKeown of Australia in 2023. The Olympic record was 2:04.06, set by Missy Franklin of the United States in 2012.

McKeown was the fastest qualifier, with her time of 2:03.30 achieved at the 2024 Australian Olympic Trials. Former world record holder Regan Smith of the United States was the second seed, with a time of 2:03.80. SwimSwam and Swimming World both opined that McKeown and Smith were the main contenders for the gold medal.

Other medal contenders included Kylie Masse of Canada and Phoebe Bacon of the United States, who finished with the silver medal and in fifth place, respectively, at the 2020 Olympic Games. Both SwimSwam and Swimming World predicted that McKeown would win gold, Smith would take silver, and Bacon would claim bronze.

Two days prior to the start of the event, McKeown won the 100 metre backstroke and Smith took silver.

The event was held at Paris La Défense Arena, which was converted to a swimming pool for the swimming events.

== Qualification ==
Each National Olympic Committee (NOC) was permitted to enter a maximum of two qualified athletes in each individual event, but only if both of them had attained the Olympic Qualifying Time (OQT). For this event, the OQT was 2:10.39. World Aquatics then filled the rest of the event places with athletes qualifying through universality; NOCs were given one event entry for each gender, which could be used by any athlete regardless of qualification time, providing the spaces had not already been taken by athletes from that nation who had achieved the OQT. In total, 26 athletes qualified through achieving the OQT, while 2 athletes qualified through universality places.

Top 10 fastest qualification times
Swimmer	Country	Time	Competition
Kaylee McKeown	Australia	2:03.30	2024 Australian Olympic Trials
Regan Smith	United States	2:03.80	2023 United States National Championships
Kylie Masse	Canada	2:06.24	2024 Canadian Olympic Trials
Phoebe Bacon	United States	2:06.27	2024 United States Olympic Trials
Peng Xuwei	China	2:06.74	2023 World Aquatics Championships
Jaclyn Barclay	Australia	2:07.03	2024 World Aquatics Championships
Katie Shanahan	Great Britain	2:07.45	2023 World Aquatics Championships
Margherita Panziera	Italy	2:08.12	2024 Italian Championships
Liu Yaxin	China	2:08.18	2023 Summer World University Games
Honey Osrin	Great Britain	2:08.37	2024 Aquatics GB Swimming Championships

== Heats ==
Four heats (preliminary rounds) took place on 1 August 2024, starting at 11:00. (Note: All times are Central European Summer Time (UTC+2)) The swimmers with the best 16 times in the heats advanced to the semifinals. China's Peng Xuwei won the third heat, qualifying with the fastest time of 2:08.29. Masse won the second heat with 2:08.54 to qualify with the second fastest time, and McKeown won the fourth heat with 2:08.89 to qualify in third.

Results
Rank	Heat	Lane	Swimmer	Nation	Time	Notes
1	3	5	Peng Xuwei	China	2:08.29	Q
2	2	4	Kylie Masse	Canada	2:08.54	Q
3	4	4	Kaylee McKeown	Australia	2:08.89	Q
4	4	5	Phoebe Bacon	United States	2:09.00	Q
5	2	3	Honey Osrin	Great Britain	2:09.57	Q
6	3	4	Regan Smith	United States	2:09.61	Q
7	3	7	Anastasiya Shkurdai	Individual Neutral Athletes	2:09.64	Q
8	4	6	Emma Terebo	France	2:09.66	Q
9	2	6	Eszter Szabó-Feltóthy	Hungary	2:09.72	Q
10	4	8	Lee Eun-ji	South Korea	2:09.88	Q
11	4	3	Katie Shanahan	Great Britain	2:09.92	Q
12	4	2	Carmen Weiler	Spain	2:10.09	Q
13	3	6	Anastasia Gorbenko	Israel	2:10.29	Q
14	4	1	Pauline Mahieu	France	2:10.30	Q
15	2	7	África Zamorano	Spain	2:10.40	Q
16	4	7	Dóra Molnár	Hungary	2:10.51	Q
17	2	5	Jaclyn Barclay	Australia	2:10.53	
18	2	1	Aviv Barzelay	Israel	2:10.71	
19	3	2	Camila Rebelo	Portugal	2:11.26	
20	3	3	Margherita Panziera	Italy	2:11.60	
21	2	8	Gabriela Georgieva	Bulgaria	2:12.15	
22	3	1	Regan Rathwell	Canada	2:12.21	
23	1	5	Tatiana Salcuțan	Moldova	2:13.20	
24	3	8	Adela Piskorska	Poland	2:13.39	
25	2	2	Laura Bernat	Poland	2:14.57	
26	1	4	Cindy Cheung	Hong Kong	2:17.32	
27	1	3	Anishta Teeluck	Mauritius	2:18.67	

== Semifinals ==
Two semifinals took place on 1 August, starting at 21:19. The swimmers with the best 8 times in the semifinals advanced to the final. Bacon led the first semifinal from beginning to end, qualifying with the fastest time of 2:07.32. McKeown won the second semifinal with 2:07.57. Masse and Smith also qualified in fifth and sixth, respectively.

Results
Rank	Heat	Lane	Swimmer	Nation	Time	Notes
1	1	5	Phoebe Bacon	United States	2:07.32	Q
2	2	5	Kaylee McKeown	Australia	2:07.57	Q
3	2	3	Honey Osrin	Great Britain	2:07.84	Q
4	2	4	Peng Xuwei	China	2:07.86	Q
5	1	4	Kylie Masse	Canada	2:07.92	Q
6	1	3	Regan Smith	United States	2:08.14	Q
7	2	7	Katie Shanahan	Great Britain	2:08.52	Q
8	2	6	Anastasiya Shkurdai	Individual Neutral Athletes	2:08.79	Q
9	1	6	Emma Terebo	France	2:09.38	
10	2	2	Eszter Szabó-Feltóthy	Hungary	2:09.41	
11	1	1	Pauline Mahieu	France	2:09.56	
12	1	8	Dóra Molnár	Hungary	2:09.83	
13	1	7	Carmen Weiler	Spain	2:09.99	
14	2	8	África Zamorano	Spain	2:10.63	
15	1	2	Lee Eun-ji	South Korea	2:11.86	
16	2	1	Anastasia Gorbenko	Israel	2:11.96	

== Final ==
The final took place at 20:37 on 2 August. Masse led the field at the 50 metre mark, but by the 100 metre turn Smith had taken the lead. At the 150 metre mark Smith was still in the lead, but over the final 50 metres McKeown took the lead to finish in first place with a new Olympic record of 2:03.73. Smith finished in second with a time of 2:04.26 to claim silver, and Masse finished third with a time of 2:05.57 to claim bronze. Bacon finished fourth, 0.04 seconds behind Masse.

McKeown's time surpassed Missy Franklin's Olympic record of 2:04.06 from 2012. Her win made her the first female to win both backstroke events at consecutive Olympics, and the first Australian athlete to win four individual gold medals.

Results
Rank	Lane	Swimmer	Nation	Time	Notes
1st place, gold medalist(s)	5	Kaylee McKeown	Australia	2:03.73	OR
2nd place, silver medalist(s)	7	Regan Smith	United States	2:04.26	
3rd place, bronze medalist(s)	2	Kylie Masse	Canada	2:05.57	
4	4	Phoebe Bacon	United States	2:05.61	
5	1	Katie Shanahan	Great Britain	2:07.53	
6	6	Peng Xuwei	China	2:07.96	
7	3	Honey Osrin	Great Britain	2:08.16	
8	8	Anastasiya Shkurdai	Individual Neutral Athletes	2:10.23	

Statistics
Name	50 metre split	100 metre split	150 metre split	Time	Stroke rate (strokes/min)
Kaylee McKeown	29.17	1:00.52	1:31.88	2:03.73	43.5
Regan Smith	29.02	59.90	1:31.70	2:04.26	47.5
Kylie Masse	28.95	1:00.37	1:32.70	2:05.57	43.6
Phoebe Bacon	29.47	1:00.77	1:32.63	2:05.61	38.0
Katie Shanahan	30.18	1:02.11	1:34.97	2:07.53	40.1
Peng Xuwei	29.72	1:01.47	1:34.48	2:07.96	44.9
Honey Osrin	29.91	1:02.29	1:34.70	2:08.16	41.3
Anastasiya Shkurdai	30.34	1:02.79	1:36.11	2:10.23	40.2
