= Swimming at the 2020 Summer Olympics – Women's 200 metre backstroke =

Women's event in the 2020 Summer Olympics

Women's 200 metre backstroke at the Games of the XXXII Olympiad
- Venue: Tokyo Aquatics Centre
- Dates: 29 July 2021 (heats); 30 July 2021 (semifinals); 31 July 2021 (final)
- Competitors: 27 from 22 nations
- Winning time: 2:04.68

Medalists
1st place, gold medalist(s)		Kaylee McKeown	Australia
2nd place, silver medalist(s)		Kylie Masse	Canada
3rd place, bronze medalist(s)		Emily Seebohm	Australia

The women's 200 metre backstroke event at the 2020 Summer Olympics was held from 29 to 31 July 2021 at the Tokyo Aquatics Centre. It was the event's fourteenth consecutive appearance, having been held at every edition since 1968.

== Summary ==
In similar fashion to her win in the shorter backstroke event days earlier, Australia's Kaylee McKeown came from behind to strike a backstroke double for the first time since Missy Franklin in 2012. Canada's Kylie Masse narrowly led over McKeown at the first turn, before extending her margin to 0.80 seconds at the halfway mark. Only recovering a tenth of a second on the penultimate lap, McKeown used a blistering final lap to overtake Masse and win Australia's first title in the event in 2:04.68. Meanwhile Masse broke her Canadian record to win the silver medal, her second at these Games.

Fifth at the final turn, Australia's two-time World champion Emily Seebohm (2:06.17) charged home to claim the bronze medal - her second individual Olympic medal - and join teammate McKeown on the podium. The U.S.' Rhyan White (2:06.39) and Phoebe Bacon (2:06.40) could not hold off Seebohm down the stretch, finishing within 0.01 seconds of each other to take fourth and fifth, respectively. Almost two seconds behind, Masse's teammate Taylor Ruck claimed a distant sixth spot in 2:08.40. The Chinese duo of Peng Xuwei (2:08.26) and Liu Yaxin (2:08.48) closed out the championship field.

Notably, the U.S.' world record holder and reigning World champion Regan Smith failed to qualify for the event after placing third at the 2020 USA Swimming Olympic trials.

== Records ==
Prior to this competition, the existing world and Olympic records were as follows.

World record	Regan Smith (USA)	2:03.35	Gwangju, South Korea	26 July 2019
Olympic record	Missy Franklin (USA)	2:04.06	London, United Kingdom	3 August 2012

Prior to this competition, the fastest time this year in the event was as follows:

World Lead	Kaylee McKeown (AUS)	2:04.28 OC	Melbourne, Australia	17 June 2021

No new records were set during the competition.

== Qualification ==
The Olympic Qualifying Time for the event is 2:10.39. Up to two swimmers per National Olympic Committee (NOC) can automatically qualify by swimming that time at an approved qualification event. The Olympic Selection Time is 2:14.30. Up to one swimmer per NOC meeting that time is eligible for selection, allocated by world ranking until the maximum quota for all swimming events is reached. NOCs without a female swimmer qualified in any event can also use their universality place.

== Competition format ==
The competition consists of three rounds: heats, semifinals, and a final. The swimmers with the best 16 times in the heats advance to the semifinals. The swimmers with the best 8 times in the semifinals advance to the final. Swim-offs are used as necessary to break ties for advancement to the next round.

== Schedule ==
All times are Japan Standard Time (UTC+9)

Date	Time	Round
29 July	20:05	Heats
30 July	11:35	Semifinals
31 July	10:37	Final

== Results ==
=== Heats ===
The swimmers with the top 16 times, regardless of heat, advanced to the semifinals.

Rank	Heat	Lane	Swimmer	Nation	Time	Notes
1	4	4	Kaylee McKeown	Australia	2:08.18	Q
2	4	5	Kylie Masse	Canada	2:08.23	Q
2	2	4	Rhyan White	United States	2:08.23	Q
4	2	5	Phoebe Bacon	United States	2:08.30	Q
5	2	6	Liu Yaxin	China	2:08.36	Q
6	4	3	Taylor Ruck	Canada	2:08.87	Q
7	3	2	Peng Xuwei	China	2:09.03	Q
8	3	5	Emily Seebohm	Australia	2:09.10	Q
8	4	6	Katalin Burián	Hungary	2:09.10	Q
10	3	6	Lena Grabowski	Austria	2:09.77	Q
11	2	1	Tatiana Salcuțan	Moldova	2:09.98	Q, NR
12	3	4	Margherita Panziera	Italy	2:10.26	Q
13	4	7	Laura Bernat	Poland	2:10.37	Q
14	4	2	África Zamorano	Spain	2:10.72	Q
15	4	8	Aviv Barzelay	Israel	2:11.13	Q
16	2	2	Sharon van Rouwendaal	Netherlands	2:11.24	Q
17	1	4	Ingeborg Løyning	Norway	2:11.68	NR
18	2	7	Lee Eun-ji	South Korea	2:11.72	
19	3	7	Daryna Zevina	Ukraine	2:12.30	
20	3	3	Katinka Hosszú	Hungary	2:12.84	
21	2	3	Cassie Wild	Great Britain	2:12.93	
22	3	1	Daria Ustinova	ROC	2:13.72	
23	1	5	Celina Márquez	El Salvador	2:14.72	
24	4	1	Ali Galyer	New Zealand	2:15.16	
25	3	8	Simona Kubová	Czech Republic	2:15.81	
26	1	3	Felicity Passon	Seychelles	2:16.18	
27	2	8	Krystal Lara	Dominican Republic	2:18.63	

=== Semifinals ===
The swimmers with the best 8 times, regardless of heat, advanced to the final.

Rank	Heat	Lane	Swimmer	Nation	Time	Notes
1	1	6	Emily Seebohm	Australia	2:07.09	Q
2	1	5	Phoebe Bacon	United States	2:07.10	Q
3	1	4	Rhyan White	United States	2:07.28	Q
4	2	5	Kylie Masse	Canada	2:07.82	Q
5	2	4	Kaylee McKeown	Australia	2:07.93	Q
6	2	3	Liu Yaxin	China	2:08.65	Q
7	1	3	Taylor Ruck	Canada	2:08.73	Q
8	2	6	Peng Xuwei	China	2:08.76	Q
9	1	7	Margherita Panziera	Italy	2:09.54	
10	2	2	Katalin Burián	Hungary	2:09.65	
11	2	7	Tatiana Salcuțan	Moldova	2:10.09	
12	1	2	Lena Grabowski	Austria	2:10.10	
13	1	1	África Zamorano	Spain	2:10.42	
14	2	1	Laura Bernat	Poland	2:12.86	
15	2	8	Aviv Barzelay	Israel	2:12.93	
16	1	8	Sharon van Rouwendaal	Netherlands	2:12.98	

=== Final ===
Rank	Lane	Swimmer	Nation	Time	Notes
1st place, gold medalist(s)	2	Kaylee McKeown	Australia	2:04.68	
2nd place, silver medalist(s)	6	Kylie Masse	Canada	2:05.42	NR
3rd place, bronze medalist(s)	4	Emily Seebohm	Australia	2:06.17	
4	3	Rhyan White	United States	2:06.39	
5	5	Phoebe Bacon	United States	2:06.40	
6	1	Taylor Ruck	Canada	2:08.24	
7	8	Peng Xuwei	China	2:08.26	
8	7	Liu Yaxin	China	2:08.48	
