= Swimming at the 2019 World Aquatics Championships – Women's 100 metre backstroke =

Women's 100 metre backstroke at the 2019 World Aquatics Championships
- Venue: Nambu University Municipal Aquatics Center
- Location: Gwangju, South Korea
- Dates: 22 July (heats and semifinals); 23 July (final)
- Competitors: 63 from 55 nations
- Winning time: 58.60

Medalists
gold medal	Kylie Masse	Canada
silver medal	Minna Atherton	Australia
bronze medal	Olivia Smoliga	United States

The Women's 100 metre backstroke competition at the 2019 World Championships was held on 22 and 23 July 2019.

== Records ==
Prior to the competition, the existing world and championship records were as follows.

World record	Kathleen Baker (USA)	58.00	Irvine, United States	28 July 2018
Competition record	Kylie Masse (CAN)	58.10	Budapest, Hungary	25 July 2017

== Results ==
=== Heats ===
The heats were held on 22 July at 10:00.

Rank	Heat	Lane	Name	Nationality	Time	Notes
1	6	4	Kylie Masse	Canada	58.91	Q
2	6	3	Minna Atherton	Australia	59.22	Q
3	5	3	Kaylee McKeown	Australia	59.25	Q
4	7	4	Kathleen Baker	United States	59.31	Q
5	7	5	Olivia Smoliga	United States	59.55	Q
6	5	4	Taylor Ruck	Canada	59.82	Q
7	7	6	Georgia Davies	Great Britain	59.84	Q
8	6	2	Simona Kubová	Czech Republic	59.95	Q
9	6	5	Margherita Panziera	Italy	59.99	Q
10	7	3	Natsumi Sakai	Japan	1:00.05	Q
11	7	7	Laura Riedemann	Germany	1:00.15	Q
12	5	2	Kira Toussaint	Netherlands	1:00.27	Q
13	5	5	Anastasia Fesikova	Russia	1:00.38	Q
14	6	9	Ingeborg Løyning	Norway	1:00.47	Q, NR
15	5	7	Chen Jie	China	1:00.64	Q
16	6	6	Daria Vaskina	Russia	1:00.66	Q
17	7	8	Silvia Scalia	Italy	1:00.74	
18	7	0	Im Da-sol	South Korea	1:00.86	
19	5	6	Mie Nielsen	Denmark	1:00.99	
20	4	3	Caroline Pilhatsch	Austria	1:01.07	NR
21	4	4	Alicja Tchórz	Poland	1:01.08	
22	6	7	Fu Yuanhui	China	1:01.19	
23	7	1	Katalin Burián	Hungary	1:01.22	
24	5	8	Stephanie Au	Hong Kong	1:01.25	
25	7	9	Maaike de Waard	Netherlands	1:01.26	
26	5	1	Mimosa Jallow	Finland	1:01.39	
27	5	0	Jessica Fullalove	Great Britain	1:01.40	
28	6	1	Béryl Gastaldello	France	1:01.45	
29	4	1	Kristina Steina	Latvia	1:01.49	
30	4	0	Ali Galyer	New Zealand	1:01.53	
31	4	8	África Zamorano	Spain	1:01.66	
32	5	9	Anastasia Gorbenko	Israel	1:01.77	
33	3	1	Gabriela Georgieva	Bulgaria	1:01.81	
34	6	0	Michelle Coleman	Sweden	1:01.95	
35	4	2	Ekaterina Avramova	Turkey	1:02.24	
36	4	7	Krystal Lara	Dominican Republic	1:02.71	
37	4	5	Nina Kost	Switzerland	1:02.86	
38	3	7	Celina Márquez	El Salvador	1:02.94	
39	3	5	Mariella Venter	South Africa	1:02.95	
40	4	9	Tatiana Salcuțan	Moldova	1:03.08	
41	3	4	Karolina Hájková	Slovakia	1:03.26	
42	3	3	Eygló Ósk Gústafsdóttir	Iceland	1:03.46	
43	2	4	Danielle Titus	Barbados	1:03.66	NR
44	3	8	Signhild Joensen	Faroe Islands	1:04.04	
45	4	6	Isabella Arcila	Colombia	1:04.07	
46	3	6	Celismar Guzman	Puerto Rico	1:04.11	
47	3	2	Diana Nazarova	Kazakhstan	1:04.22	
48	3	9	Lushavel Stickland	Samoa	1:05.22	
49	2	6	Mia Krstevska	North Macedonia	1:06.00	
50	3	0	Kimiko Raheem	Sri Lanka	1:06.52	
51	1	2	Robyn Lee	Zimbabwe	1:06.96	
52	2	5	Maria Arrua	Paraguay	1:07.08	
53	1	4	Catarina Sousa	Angola	1:07.96	NR
54	2	3	Eda Zeqiri	Kosovo	1:08.37	
55	1	3	Idealy Tendrinavalona	Madagascar	1:08.41	
56	2	2	Kimberly Ince	Grenada	1:09.85	NR
57	2	9	Leedia Al-Safadi	Jordan	1:10.11	
58	2	7	Colleen Furgeson	Marshall Islands	1:13.64	
59	1	6	Robyn Young	Eswatini	1:13.97	
60	1	5	Osisang Chilton	Palau	1:16.55	
61	2	0	Ammara Pinto	Malawi	1:16.68	
62	2	1	Aishath Sausan	Maldives	1:19.82	
63	2	8	Shivani Bhatt	Tanzania	1:24.04	
	6	8	Louise Hansson	Sweden	DNS	
	7	2	Katinka Hosszú	Hungary	DNS	

=== Semifinals ===
The semifinals were held on 22 July at 20:54.

==== Semifinal 1 ====
Rank	Lane	Name	Nationality	Time	Notes
1	4	Minna Atherton	Australia	58.60	Q
2	3	Taylor Ruck	Canada	58.83	Q
3	5	Kathleen Baker	United States	59.03	Q
4	8	Daria Vaskina	Russia	59.46	Q
5	2	Natsumi Sakai	Japan	59.71	Q
6	6	Simona Kubová	Czech Republic	59.79	
7	7	Kira Toussaint	Netherlands	1:00.13	
8	1	Ingeborg Løyning	Norway	1:00.35	NR

==== Semifinal 2 ====
Rank	Lane	Name	Nationality	Time	Notes
1	4	Kylie Masse	Canada	58.50	Q
2	5	Kaylee McKeown	Australia	59.13	Q
3	3	Olivia Smoliga	United States	59.36	Q
4	7	Laura Riedemann	Germany	59.82	
5	2	Margherita Panziera	Italy	59.83	
6	6	Georgia Davies	Great Britain	59.90	
7	1	Anastasia Fesikova	Russia	1:00.33	
8	8	Chen Jie	China	1:01.68	

=== Final ===
The final was held on 23 July at 20:51.

Rank	Lane	Name	Nationality	Time	Notes
1st place, gold medalist(s)	4	Kylie Masse	Canada	58.60	
2nd place, silver medalist(s)	5	Minna Atherton	Australia	58.85	
3rd place, bronze medalist(s)	7	Olivia Smoliga	United States	58.91	
4	3	Taylor Ruck	Canada	58.96	
5	2	Kaylee McKeown	Australia	59.10	
6	6	Kathleen Baker	United States	59.56	
6	8	Natsumi Sakai	Japan	59.56	
8	1	Daria Vaskina	Russia	59.74	
