= Swimming at the 2016 European Aquatics Championships – Women's 100 metre backstroke =

Women's 100 metre backstroke at the 2016 European Aquatics Championships
- Dates: 18–19 May
- Competitors: 47 from 28 nations
- Winning time: 58.73

Medalists
gold medal	Mie Østergaard Nielsen	Denmark
silver medal	Katinka Hosszú	Hungary
bronze medal	Kathleen Dawson	Great Britain

The Women's 100 metre backstroke competition of the 2016 European Aquatics Championships was held on 18 and 19 May 2016.

== Records ==
Prior to the competition, the existing world, European and championship records were as follows.

	Name	Nation	Time	Location	Date
World record	Gemma Spofforth	Great Britain	58.12	Rome	28 July 2009
European record	Gemma Spofforth	Great Britain	58.12	Rome	28 July 2009
Championship record	Anastasia Zuyeva	Russia	59.41	Eindhoven	21 March 2008

== Results ==
=== Heats ===
The heats were held on 18 May at 10:49.

Rank	Heat	Lane	Name	Nationality	Time	Notes
1	5	4	Mie Østergaard Nielsen	Denmark	59.26	Q, CR
2	6	4	Katinka Hosszú	Hungary	59.38	Q
3	5	2	Kathleen Dawson	Great Britain	1:00.60	Q
4	6	2	Katarína Listopadová	Slovakia	1:00.78	Q
5	3	4	Ekaterina Avramova	Turkey	1:00.82	Q
6	4	4	Georgia Davies	Great Britain	1:00.84	Q
7	6	7	Carlotta Zofkova	Italy	1:00.88	Q
8	6	6	Alicja Tchórz	Poland	1:00.89	Q
9	6	5	Daryna Zevina	Ukraine	1:00.98	Q
10	5	3	Matea Samardžić	Croatia	1:01.27	Q
10	4	1	Theodora Drakou	Greece	1:01.27	Q
12	4	5	Eygló Ósk Gústafsdóttir	Iceland	1:01.44	Q
12	5	5	Elena Gemo	Italy	1:01.44	Q
14	5	7	Margherita Panziera	Italy	1:01.45	
15	4	6	Irina Prikhodko	Russia	1:01.47	Q
16	5	6	Mimosa Jallow	Finland	1:01.49	Q
17	4	3	Simona Baumrtová	Czech Republic	1:01.67	Q
18	4	7	Harriet Cooper	Great Britain	1:01.88	
19	5	1	Kristīna Šteins	Latvia	1:01.93	
20	4	2	Camille Gheorghiu	France	1:02.11	
21	4	8	Maaike de Waard	Netherlands	1:02.13	
22	4	0	Charlotte Evans	Great Britain	1:02.35	
23	6	9	Kata Burián	Hungary	1:02.38	
24	3	5	Halime Zülal Zeren	Turkey	1:02.41	
25	5	8	Caroline Pilhatsch	Austria	1:02.52	
26	6	0	Tereza Grusová	Czech Republic	1:02.61	
27	3	6	Ugnė Mažutaitytė	Lithuania	1:02.66	
28	6	8	Ida Lindborg	Sweden	1:02.70	
29	3	2	Alina Kendzior	Estonia	1:02.75	
30	5	9	Ludwika Szynal	Poland	1:02.94	
31	3	7	Karolina Hájková	Slovakia	1:03.00	
32	2	2	Henriette Stenkvist	Sweden	1:03.02	
33	2	8	Věra Kopřivová	Czech Republic	1:03.34	
34	3	3	Karin Tomečková	Slovakia	1:03.44	
35	5	0	Réka György	Hungary	1:03.53	
35	3	1	Danielle Hill	Ireland	1:03.53	
37	2	5	Jade Smits	Belgium	1:03.62	
38	3	8	Ema Šarar	Croatia	1:03.95	
39	6	1	Mathilde Cini	France	1:04.08	
40	2	6	Sigrid Sepp	Estonia	1:04.55	
41	3	9	Ana Leite	Portugal	1:04.68	
42	1	4	Signhild Joensen	Faroe Islands	1:04.84	
43	2	3	Kätlin Sepp	Estonia	1:05.18	
44	3	0	Tatiana Salcutan	Moldova	1:05.65	
45	2	1	Francisca Azevedo	Portugal	1:05.68	
46	1	5	Desiree Felner	Austria	1:06.07	
47	1	3	Rita Zeqiri	Kosovo	1:12.67	
	2	0	Keren Siebner	Israel	DNS	
	2	4	Sanja Jovanović	Croatia	DNS	
	2	7	Magdalena Kuras	Sweden	DNS	
	4	9	Andrea Murez	Israel	DNS	
	6	3	Kira Toussaint	Netherlands	DNS	

=== Semifinals ===
The semifinals were held on 18 May at 19:41.

==== Semifinal 1 ====
Rank	Lane	Name	Nationality	Time	Notes
1	4	Katinka Hosszú	Hungary	1:00.03	Q
2	3	Georgia Davies	Great Britain	1:00.58	Q
3	8	Simona Baumrtová	Czech Republic	1:00.83	
4	1	Irina Prikhodko	Russia	1:01.09	
5	6	Alicja Tchórz	Poland	1:01.19	
6	5	Katarína Listopadová	Slovakia	1:01.33	
7	7	Elena Gemo	Italy	1:01.70	
8	2	Theodora Drakou	Greece	1:02.06	

==== Semifinal 2 ====
Rank	Lane	Name	Nationality	Time	Notes
1	4	Mie Østergaard Nielsen	Denmark	59.16	Q, CR
2	5	Kathleen Dawson	Great Britain	59.83	Q
3	2	Daryna Zevina	Ukraine	1:00.31	Q
4	1	Eygló Ósk Gústafsdóttir	Iceland	1:00.46	Q
5	3	Ekaterina Avramova	Turkey	1:00.52	Q
6	6	Carlotta Zofkova	Italy	1:00.81	Q
7	8	Mimosa Jallow	Finland	1:01.16	
8	7	Matea Samardžić	Croatia	1:01.80	

=== Final ===
The final was held on 19 May at 19:00.

Rank	Lane	Name	Nationality	Time	Notes
1st place, gold medalist(s)	4	Mie Østergaard Nielsen	Denmark	58.73	CR
2nd place, silver medalist(s)	3	Katinka Hosszú	Hungary	58.94	
3rd place, bronze medalist(s)	5	Kathleen Dawson	Great Britain	59.68	
4	6	Daryna Zevina	Ukraine	59.97	
5	1	Georgia Davies	Great Britain	59.99	
6	2	Eygló Ósk Gústafsdóttir	Iceland	1:00.98	
6	8	Carlotta Zofkova	Italy	1:00.98	
8	7	Ekaterina Avramova	Turkey	1:01.10	
