= Swimming at the 2020 European Aquatics Championships – Mixed 4 × 100 metre medley relay =

Mixed 4 × 100 metre medley relay at the 2020 European Aquatics Championships
- Venue: Danube Arena
- Dates: 20 May 2021
- Competitors: 124 from 27 nations
- Teams: 27
- Winning time: 3:38.82

Medalists
gold medal	Kathleen Dawson; Adam Peaty; James Guy; Anna Hopkin; Joe Litchfield; Harriet Jones	Great Britain
silver medal	Kira Toussaint; Arno Kamminga; Nyls Korstanje; Femke Heemskerk; Ranomi Kromowidjojo	Netherlands
bronze medal	Margherita Panziera; Nicolò Martinenghi; Elena Di Liddo; Alessandro Miressi; Simone Sabbioni; Silvia Di Pietro	Italy

The Mixed 4 × 100 metre medley relay competition of the 2020 European Aquatics Championships was held on 20 May 2021.

== Records ==
Before the competition, the existing European and championship records were as follows.

	Team	Time	Location	Date
World record	China	3:38.41	Qingdao	1 October 2020
European record	Great Britain	3:40.18	Glasgow	6 August 2018
Championship record	Great Britain	3:40.18	Glasgow	6 August 2018

The following new records were set during this competition.

Date	Event	Nation	Time	Record
20 May	Final	Great Britain	3:38.82	ER, CR

== Results ==
=== Heats ===
The heats were started at 11:09.

Rank	Heat	Lane	Nation	Swimmers	Time	Notes
1	3	8	Great Britain	Joe Litchfield (53.92); Adam Peaty (57.63); Harriet Jones (58.66); Anna Hopkin (53.09)	3:43.30	Q
2	1	6	Italy	Simone Sabbioni (54.25); Nicolò Martinenghi (58.11); Elena Di Liddo (57.89); Silvia Di Pietro (53.84)	3:44.09	Q
3	3	7	Russia	Grigoriy Tarasevich (53.43); Danil Semyaninov (59.66); Svetlana Chimrova (57.37); Arina Surkova (54.63)	3:45.09	Q
4	2	6	Netherlands	Ranomi Kromowidjojo (1:01.58); Arno Kamminga (58.31); Nyls Korstanje (52.52); Femke Heemskerk (52.85)	3:45.26	Q
5	3	4	France	Yohann Ndoye Brouard (53.64); Theo Bussiere (59.97); Marie Wattel (57.83); Assia Touati (54.95)	3:46.39	Q, WD, NR
6	3	1	Poland	Alicja Tchorz (1:01.02); Jan Kozakiewicz (59.67); Jakub Majerski (51.11); Kornelia Fiedkiewicz (54.63)	3:46.43	Q, NR
7	2	7	Spain	Hugo González (53.00); Jessica Vall (1:07.31); Alberto Lozano (52.24); Lidón Muñoz (54.05)	3:46.60	Q, NR
8	1	7	Switzerland	Thierry Bollin (55.34); Lisa Mamie (1:06.56); Noè Ponti (50.91); Maria Ugolkova (54.04)	3:46.85	Q
9	1	5	Belarus	Viktar Staselovich (54.50); Ilya Shymanovich (58.22); Anastasiya Kuliashova (59.05); Nastassia Karakouskaya (56.06)	3:47.83	Q
10	2	0	Sweden	Gustav Hökfelt (55.15); Johannes Skagius (1:00.13); Sara Junevik (58.96); Michelle Coleman (53.74)	3:47.98	NR
11	3	2	Denmark	Karoline Sørensen (1:02.40); Tobias Bjerg (58.98); Emilie Beckmann (58.04); Mathias Rysgaard (48.64)	3:48.06	NR
12	2	5	Czech Republic	Tomáš Franta (54.61); Matěj Zábojník (1:01.73); Barbora Janíčková (1:00.01); Barbora Seemanová (52.51)	3:48.86	NR
13	2	3	Ireland	Shane Ryan (54.50); Darragh Greene (59.09); Ellen Walshe (1:00.18); Danielle Hill (55.31)	3:49.08	NR
14	2	8	Greece	Evangelos Makrygiannis (54.88); Konstantinos Meretsolias (1:00.46); Anna Ntountounaki (57.58); Theodora Drakou (56.29)	3:49.21	
15	1	1	Germany	Nadine Lämmler (1:02.70); Melvin Imoudu (1:00.67); Ramon Klenz (52.25); Julia Mrozinski (55.17)	3:50.79	
16	1	4	Estonia	Armin Evert Lelle (55.88); Eneli Jefimova (1:07.44); Alex Ahtiainen (52.72); Aleksa Gold (54.90)	3:50.94	NR
17	3	9	Bulgaria	Gabriela Georgieva (1:04.33); Lyubomir Epitropov (1:01.53); Josif Miladinov (51.48); Diana Petkova (54.80)	3:52.14	NR
18	3	5	Hungary	Richárd Bohus (54.87); Anna Sztankovics (1:08.08); Dóra Hatházi (1:00.62); Péter Holoda (48.64)	3:52.21	
19	1	2	Austria	Bernhard Reitshammer (55.10); Christopher Rothbauer (1:01.08); Lena Kreundl (1:00.71); Cornelia Pammer (55.88)	3:52.77	NR
20	1	3	Turkey	Metin Aydın (56.42); Demirkan Demir (1:01.13); Nida Eliz Üstündağ (1:00.86); Selen Özbilen (55.98)	3:54.39	
21	2	9	Norway	Ingeborg Løyning (1:04.24); André Klippenberg Grindheim (1:00.18); Tomoe Zenimoto Hvas (52.75); Malene Rypestøl (57.29)	3:54.46	NR
22	2	1	Moldova	Tatiana Salcuțan (1:02.63); Anastasia Basisto (1:08.52); Alexei Sancov (52.69); Constantin Malachi (50.91)	3:54.75	NR
23	3	3	Israel	Michael Laitarovsky (55.46); Lea Polonsky (1:10.16); Tomer Frankel (53.44); Daria Golovaty (55.72)	3:54.78	
24	3	0	Lithuania	Ugnė Mažutaitytė (1:03.87); Kotryna Teterevkova (1:08.84); Deividas Margevičius (52.42); Simonas Bilis (49.73)	3:54.86	
25	2	4	Slovakia	Tamara Potocká (1:04.23); Tomáš Klobučník (1:01.59); Zora Ripková (1:00.82); Matej Duša (49.23)	3:55.87	
26	3	6	Latvia	Ģirts Feldbergs (56.46); Daniils Bobrovs (1:02.78); Arina Baikova (1:05.08); Gabriela Ņikitina (56.58)	4:00.90	
27	2	2	Andorra	Mónica Ramírez (1:06.01); Nàdia Tudó (1:14.91); Bernat Lomero (56.96); Tomàs Lomero (52.13)	4:10.01	NR

=== Final ===
The final was held at 19:22.

Rank	Lane	Nation	Swimmers	Time	Notes
1st place, gold medalist(s)	4	Great Britain	Kathleen Dawson (58.43); Adam Peaty (57.13); James Guy (50.61); Anna Hopkin (52.65)	3:38.82	ER, CR
2nd place, silver medalist(s)	6	Netherlands	Kira Toussaint (59.59); Arno Kamminga (58.37); Nyls Korstanje (51.45); Femke Heemskerk (51.87)	3:41.28	NR
3rd place, bronze medalist(s)	5	Italy	Margherita Panziera (59.55); Nicolò Martinenghi (58.05); Elena Di Liddo (57.54); Alessandro Miressi (47.16)	3:42.30	NR
4	3	Russia	Kliment Kolesnikov (52.09); Yuliya Yefimova (1:06.01); Andrey Minakov (51.64); Maria Kameneva (53.86)	3:43.60	
5	1	Switzerland	Roman Mityukov (53.92); Lisa Mamie (1:07.21); Noè Ponti (50.98); Maria Ugolkova (54.05)	3:46.16	
6	8	Belarus	Viktar Staselovich (54.93); Ilya Shymanovich (58.00); Anastasiya Kuliashova (58.91); Anastasiya Shkurdai (54.98)	3:46.82	
7	2	Poland	Kacper Stokowski (54.38); Jan Kalusowski (1:00.90); Paulina Peda (58.94); Katarzyna Wasick (54.80)	3:49.02	
8	7	Spain	Nicolás García (54.90); Jessica Vall (1:08.18); Alberto Lozano (52.39); Lidón Muñoz (54.43)	3:49.90	
