= Swimming at the 2018 European Aquatics Championships – Women's 200 metre backstroke =

Women's 200 metre backstroke at the 2018 European Aquatics Championships
- Venue: Tollcross International Swimming Centre
- Dates: 8 August (heats and semifinals); 9 August (final)
- Competitors: 29 from 20 nations
- Winning time: 2:06.18

Medalists
gold medal	Margherita Panziera	Italy
silver medal	Daria Ustinova	Russia
bronze medal	Katalin Burián	Hungary

The Women's 200 metre backstroke competition of the 2018 European Aquatics Championships was held on 8 and 9 August 2018.

== Records ==
Prior to the competition, the existing world and championship records were as follows.

	Name	Nation	Time	Location	Date
World record	Missy Franklin	United States	2:04.06	London	3 August 2012
European record	Anastasia Zuyeva	Russia	2:04.94	Rome	1 August 2009
Championship record	Krisztina Egerszegi	Hungary	2:06.62	Athens	25 August 1991

The following new records were set during this competition.

Date	Event	Name	Nationality	Time	Record
9 August	Final	Margherita Panziera	Italy	2:06.18	CR

== Results ==
=== Heats ===
The heats were started on 8 August at 09:00.

Rank	Heat	Lane	Name	Nationality	Time	Notes
1	2	4	Daria Ustinova	Russia	2:08.89	Q
2	1	5	Katalin Burián	Hungary	2:10.22	Q
3	1	3	Anastasiia Avdeeva	Russia	2:10.31	Q
4	1	4	Margherita Panziera	Italy	2:10.32	Q
5	2	3	Jenny Mensing	Germany	2:11.23	Q
6	2	6	Cristina García	Spain	2:12.59	Q
7	2	5	Daryna Zevina	Ukraine	2:12.90	Q
8	2	0	Gabriela Georgieva	Bulgaria	2:13.11	Q
9	2	1	Ekaterina Avramova	Turkey	2:13.40	Q
10	3	2	Simona Baumrtová	Czech Republic	2:13.45	Q
11	3	3	Polina Egorova	Russia	2:13.68	
12	2	7	Tessa Vermeulen	Netherlands	2:13.70	Q
13	2	2	Kathryn Greenslade	Great Britain	2:13.75	Q
14	3	5	Lisa Graf	Germany	2:13.77	Q
15	3	6	África Zamorano	Spain	2:14.30	Q
16	1	8	Lena Grabowski	Austria	2:15.30	Q
17	3	9	Aviv Barzelay	Israel	2:15.46	Q
18	3	7	Shahar Menahem	Israel	2:15.58	
19	1	0	Signhild Joensen	Faroe Islands	2:15.84	
20	1	6	Carlotta Toni	Italy	2:16.53	
21	3	1	Weronika Górecka	Poland	2:16.60	
22	2	9	Victoria Bierre	Denmark	2:16.75	
23	2	8	Anastasia Gorbenko	Israel	2:16.89	
24	3	8	Karolina Hájková	Slovakia	2:17.20	
25	3	0	Vilma Ruotsalainen	Finland	2:18.58	
26	1	1	Aleksa Gold	Estonia	2:18.95	
27	1	2	Maryna Kolesnykova	Ukraine	2:19.22	
28	1	7	Agata Naskręt	Poland	2:20.19	
29	1	9	Fjorda Šabani	Kosovo	2:27.71	
	3	4	Katinka Hosszú	Hungary	Did not start	

=== Semifinals ===
The semifinals were started on 8 August at 16:53.

==== Semifinal 1 ====
Rank	Lane	Name	Nationality	Time	Notes
1	5	Margherita Panziera	Italy	2:07.27	Q
2	4	Katalin Burián	Hungary	2:07.65	Q
3	1	África Zamorano	Spain	2:11.69	Q
4	2	Simona Baumrtová	Czech Republic	2:12.02	
5	3	Cristina García	Spain	2:12.67	
6	6	Gabriela Georgieva	Bulgaria	2:13.19	
7	7	Kathryn Greenslade	Great Britain	2:13.96	
8	8	Aviv Barzelay	Israel	2:15.41	

==== Semifinal 2 ====
Rank	Lane	Name	Nationality	Time	Notes
1	4	Daria Ustinova	Russia	2:08.19	Q
2	3	Jenny Mensing	Germany	2:08.92	Q
3	1	Lisa Graf	Germany	2:09.32	Q
4	5	Anastasiia Avdeeva	Russia	2:09.54	Q
5	6	Daryna Zevina	Ukraine	2:11.17	Q
6	7	Tessa Vermeulen	Netherlands	2:13.32	
7	2	Ekaterina Avramova	Turkey	2:14.13	
8	8	Lena Grabowski	Austria	2:15.08	

=== Final ===
The final was started on 9 August at 17:20.

Rank	Lane	Name	Nationality	Time	Notes
1st place, gold medalist(s)	4	Margherita Panziera	Italy	2:06.18	CR
2nd place, silver medalist(s)	3	Daria Ustinova	Russia	2:07.12	
3rd place, bronze medalist(s)	5	Katalin Burián	Hungary	2:07.43	
4	2	Lisa Graf	Germany	2:08.58	
5	7	Anastasiia Avdeeva	Russia	2:10.03	
6	6	Jenny Mensing	Germany	2:10.77	
7	1	Daryna Zevina	Ukraine	2:10.89	
8	8	África Zamorano	Spain	2:11.55	
