= Mitzpe Aviv =

Mitzpe Aviv: מִצְפֵּה אָבִי"ב (Hebrew)
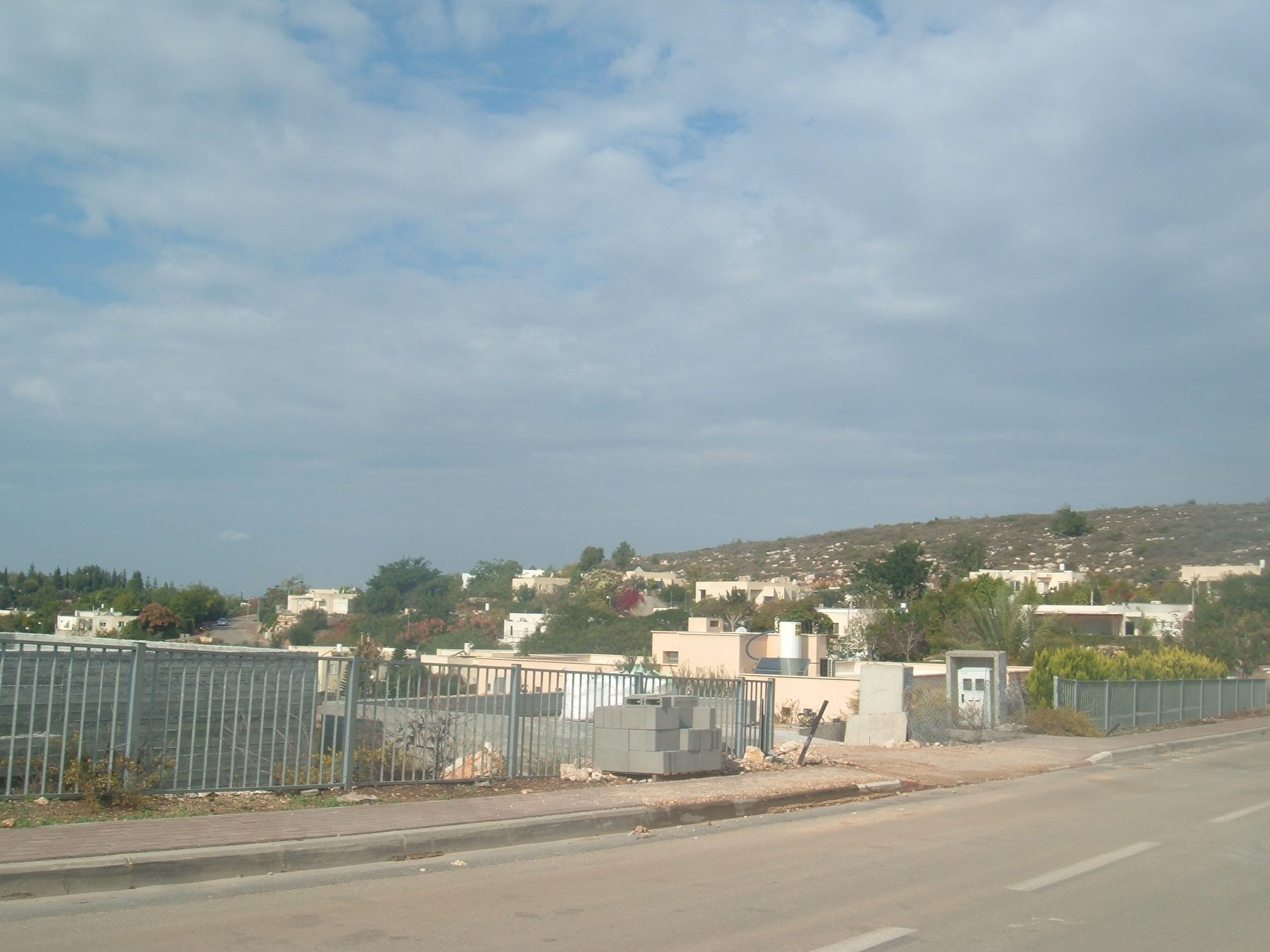
- Etymology: Spring Lookout
- Location within Northwest Israel Location within Israel
- Coordinates: 32°50′14″N 35°12′2″E
- Country: Israel
- District: Northern
- Subdistrict: Acre
- Council: Misgav
- Affiliation: Agricultural Union
- Founded: 1981
- Population (2024): 1,088

Mitzpe Aviv (Hebrew: מִצְפֵּה אָבִי"ב, lit. 'Spring Lookout') is a community settlement in northern Israel. Located in the Galilee near I'billin and Tamra, it falls under the jurisdiction of Misgav Regional Council. In 2024 it had a population of 1,088.

== History ==
The village was established in 1981. The second part of its name is an acronym for the name of the geographer and historian Avraham Ya'akov Brawer.

In November 2009, Mitzpe Aviv amended its bylaws to require that members share the community's vision and goals, which include Zionism and Israel as a Jewish state. Two other community settlements in the area, Manof and Yuvalim, had previously considered similar requirements, but did not implement them.

== Notable residents ==
- Aviv Barzelay (born 2002), Olympic swimmer
