= Dóra Molnár =

Hungarian swimmer (born 2006)

Personal information
- National team: Hungary
- Born: 29 June 2006 (age 20) Budafok, Hungary

Sport
- Sport: Swimming
- Strokes: Backstroke, freestyle
- Club: Budafóka SE
- Coach: Támás Horváth
Medal record
Women's swimming
Representing Hungary
Event	1st	2nd	3rd
World Championships (SC)	0	1	0
European Championships (LC)	2	1	3
World Junior Championships	4	1	0
European Junior Championships	8	3	3
Total	14	6	6
World Championships (SC)
Silver medal – second place	2024 Budapest	4×200 m freestyle
European Championships (LC)
Gold medal – first place	2024 Belgrade	4×100 m freestyle
Gold medal – first place	2024 Belgrade	4×200 m mixed freestyle
Silver medal – second place	2024 Belgrade	4×200 m freestyle
Bronze medal – third place	2022 Rome	200 m backstroke
Bronze medal – third place	2022 Rome	4×200 m freestyle
Bronze medal – third place	2024 Belgrade	200 m backstroke
World Junior Championships
Gold medal – first place	2022 Lima	100 m backstroke
Gold medal – first place	2022 Lima	4×100 m freestyle
Gold medal – first place	2022 Lima	4×200 m freestyle
Gold medal – first place	2022 Lima	4×100 m mixed freestyle
Silver medal – second place	2022 Lima	200 m backstroke
European Junior Championships
Gold medal – first place	2022 Otopeni	100 m backstroke
Gold medal – first place	2022 Otopeni	200 m backstroke
Gold medal – first place	2022 Otopeni	4×200 m freestyle
Gold medal – first place	2022 Otopeni	4×100 m mixed freestyle
Gold medal – first place	2023 Belgrade	200 m backstroke
Gold medal – first place	2023 Belgrade	4x200 m freestyle
Gold medal – first place	2023 Belgrade	4x100 m mixed freestyle
Gold medal – first place	2024 Vilnius	4x200 m freestyle
Silver medal – second place	2022 Otopeni	100 m freestyle
Silver medal – second place	2022 Otopeni	4×100 m medley
Silver medal – second place	2023 Belgrade	4x100 m freestyle
Bronze medal – third place	2021 Rome	4×100 m freestyle
Bronze medal – third place	2023 Belgrade	100 m freestyle
Bronze medal – third place	2024 Vilnius	200 m freestyle
Bronze medal – third place	2024 Vilnius	200 m backstroke

Dóra Molnár (born 29 June 2006) is a Hungarian competitive swimmer. Competing at the 2022 World Aquatics Championships when she was 15 years old, she placed seventh in the 200-metre backstroke, fifth in the 4×200-metre freestyle relay, and eighth in the 4×100-metre freestyle relay. She is the 2022 European Aquatics Championships bronze medalist in the 200-metre backstroke. She won four gold medals, in the 100-metre backstroke, 4×100-metre freestyle relay, 4×200-metre freestyle relay, and the 4×100-metre mixed freestyle relay, as well as one silver medal, in the 200-metre backstroke, at the 2022 World Junior Championships. At the 2022 European Junior Championships, she won gold medals in the 100-metre backstroke, 200-metre backstroke, 4×200-metre freestyle relay, and 4×100-metre mixed freestyle relay and silver medals in the 100-metre freestyle and 4×100-metre medley relay.

== Background ==
Molnár was born 29 June 2006 in Budafok, Budapest, Hungary. She trains with coach Támás Horváth at, and competes for, Budafóka SE swim club.

== Career ==
=== 2021–2022 ===
For the 2021 European Junior Swimming Championships, contested at Stadio Olimpico del Nuoto in Rome, Italy in July, Molnár won a bronze medal in the 4×100-metre freestyle relay, splitting a 56.20 for the third leg of the relay, placed fourth in the 4×100-metre medley relay, fifth in the 4×100-metre mixed medley relay, and 16th in the 100-metre freestyle with a time of 56.89 seconds. Leading up to the 2022 World Aquatics Championships, she achieved a personal best time of 2:09.34 in the 200-metre backstroke at the 2022 Hungarian National Championships, winning the gold medal, and qualifying for the World Championships in the event before stating one of her long terms goals, competing at the 2024 Summer Olympics.

==== 2022 World Aquatics Championships ====
As a 15-year-old at her first senior World Championships, the 2022 World Aquatics Championships conducted with pool swimming competition at Danube Arena in Budapest, Molnár placed eighth in the 4×100-metre freestyle relay on the first day, 18 June. Four days later, she helped achieve a fifth-place finish in the 4×200-metre freestyle relay, splitting a 1:59.76 for the second leg of the relay in the final to contribute to the final mark of 7:57.90. For her individual event, the 200-metre backstroke, she placed seventh in the final on 24 June with a time of 2:10.08, which was a little over three seconds slower than the bronze medalist in the event Rhyan White of the United States.

==== 2022 European Junior Championships ====
2022 European Junior Championships
Gold medal – first place	4×100 m mixed freestyle	3:28.83
Gold medal – first place	4×200 m freestyle	7:59.04
Gold medal – first place	200 m backstroke	2:10.31
Gold medal – first place	100 m backstroke	1:00.88
Silver medal – second place	100 m freestyle	55.20
Silver medal – second place	4×100 m medley	4:05.48

Day one of the 2022 European Junior Swimming Championships, held starting on 5 July in Otopeni, Romania, Molnár swam a 55.11 for lead-off leg of 4×100-metre freestyle relay in the preliminaries to help advance it the final ranking second, before anchoring the relay with a 54.13 in the final to help achieve an eighth-place finish in 3:54.60. The second day of competition, she anchored the 4×100-metre mixed freestyle relay with a time of 54.49 seconds, passing the anchor-leg swimmer on the relay team for Romania to win the gold medal in a final time of 3:28.83. On 7 July, she won a gold medal as part of the 4×200-metre freestyle relay, helping achieve a finish in 7:59.04 in the final, which was over nine seconds faster than the silver medal-winning team from Italy and over 15 seconds ahead of the fourth-place team from Spain.

For day four of competition, Molnár won the gold medal in the 200-metre backstroke with a time of 2:10.31 to finish less than one second ahead of the bronze medalist in the event Evie Dilley of Great Britain. The following day, she swam a time of 55.20 seconds in the final of the 100-metre freestyle, winning the silver medal behind Nikolett Pádár, also of Hungary. She followed up her performance with another gold medal the following day, winning the 100-metre backstroke with a time of 1:00.88 to just finish ahead of silver medalist Roos Vanotterdijk of Belgium by 0.02 seconds. Later in the same day, the sixth and final day, she won a silver medal in the 4×100-metre medley relay, contributing to a final time of 4:05.48 by splitting a 1:01.58 for the backstroke leg of the relay.

==== 2022 European Aquatics Championships ====
2022 European Championships (LC)
Bronze medal – third place	4×200 m freestyle	7:55.73 (h)
Bronze medal – third place	200 m backstroke	2:09.73

Molnár was one of fourteen women named to the Hungarian roster in swimming for the 2022 European Aquatics Championships. In the morning on day one, competing in Rome, Italy at Foro Italico, she ranked second in the preliminaries of the 200-metre backstroke and qualified for the semifinals with a time of 2:09.53. Later in the morning session, she anchored the 4×200-metre freestyle relay with a 2:01.72 to help qualify the relay to the final ranking first with a time of 8:01.05. She finished in a time of 2:09.88 in the evening semifinals of the 200-metre backstroke, qualifying for the final the following day ranking fourth. Later in the session, she won a bronze medal for her efforts in the prelims heats of the 4×200-metre freestyle relay when the finals relay placed third in 7:55.73. The following day, at 16 years, 44 days of age, she won the bronze medal in the 200-metre backstroke with a time of 2:09.73.

In the 4×100-metre freestyle relay on day three of competition, Molnár anchored the relay to a fifth-place finish in 3:39.42, splitting a 54.38. Two days later, she ranked sixteenth in the preliminaries of the 100-metre backstroke with a 1:01.62 and qualified for the semifinals. She placed twelfth in the semifinals with a time of 1:01.13. Approximately 90 minutes later, she anchored the 4×100-metre mixed freestyle relay to a seventh-place finish in 3:26.54 along with finals relay teammates Nándor Németh, Szebasztián Szabó, and Nikolett Pádár, contributing a split time of 54.88 seconds.

==== 2022 World Junior Championships ====
2022 World Junior Championships
Gold medal – first place	4×200 m freestyle	8:04.70
Gold medal – first place	100 m backstroke	1:01.44
Gold medal – first place	4×100 m mixed freestyle	3:30.03
Gold medal – first place	4×100 m freestyle	3:41.94
Silver medal – second place	200 m backstroke	2:09.80

For the 2022 FINA World Junior Swimming Championships, held in Lima, Peru starting later the same month as the European Championships, Molnár and fourteen other Hungarians entered to compete. Finishing in a time of 1:02.27 in the preliminaries of the 100-metre backstroke on day one, she qualified for the semifinals ranking second. For her second event of the morning, she split a 2:04.67 for the second leg of the 4×200-metre freestyle relay, helping qualify the relay to final with a time of 8:26.65 and overall third-rank. In the evening session, she ranked second in the semifinals of the 100-metre backstroke with a 1:02.19, advancing to the final. She followed her semifinals swim up with a 2:02.40 for the second leg of the 4×200-metre freestyle relay in the final, helping win the gold medal with a time of 8:04.70. Finishing in a time of 1:01.44, just 0.01 seconds ahead of Aimi Nagaoka of Japan, in the final of the 100-metre backstroke the following day, she won the gold medal.

The morning of day three, Molnár ranked first in the preliminary heats of the 200-metre backstroke with a 2:11.62, which was less than five-tenths of a second ahead of second-ranked Mio Narita of Japan, and qualified for the final. In the evening final, she won the silver medal, finishing 1.29 seconds ahead of bronze medalist Laura Bernat of Poland with a time of 2:09.80. Later in the same session, she started the fourth leg of the 4×100-metre mixed freestyle relay only behind the relay team from Romania, as she swam her 100-metre portion of the relay in 55.37 seconds, she passed the swimmer from Romania to achieve a first-place finish in 3:30.03 with finals relay teammates Dániel Mészáros, Benedek Bóna, and Nikolett Pádár and win the gold medal.

Two days later, in the preliminaries of the 4×100-metre freestyle relay, Molnár split a 58.43 for the anchor leg to help rank second overall and qualify for the final. She anchored the relay in the final to a first-place finish in 3:41.94 with a split time of 55.06 seconds. The sixth and final morning, she contributed to a time of 4:13.65 in the preliminaries of the 4×100-metre medley relay with a split of 1:02.71 for the 100-metre backstroke portion and the relay qualified for the final ranking fourth. She brought her time down to a 1:02.27 in the final, helping place fourth in 4:09.33.

==== 2022 Hungarian Short Course Championships ====
Starting off the 2022 Hungarian National Short Course Championships, in Kaposvár in November, Molnár placed fourth in the 100-metre freestyle with a time of 54.77 seconds and fifth in the 50-metre backstroke with a 28.56 on day one. Day two of four, she won the silver medal in the 100-metre backstroke with a time of 59.49 seconds, which was less than one-tenth of a second slower than the gold medalist. On the third day, she achieved a personal best time of 1:58.93 in the 200-metre freestyle, which marked her first time faster than 2:00.00 in the event and placed her fifth overall. The fourth and final day, she won the national title and gold medal in the 200-metre backstroke with a personal best time of 2:06.10.

The following month, Molnár achieved six personal best times out of her individual event finals at the 2022 Hungarian Junior National Short Course Championships in Szeged, starting with the 200-metre individual medley on day one, where she won the silver medal with a 2:15.21. The finals session of the second day, she won a bronze medal in the 200-metre butterfly with a personal best time of 2:13.40. Her second personal best time of the evening was in the 50-metre freestyle, where she placed fifth in 26.00 seconds. Day three she placed fourth in the 50-metre butterfly with a personal best time of 27.64 seconds, which was 0.87 seconds behind gold medalist Lora Komoróczy. For her first personal best time in an individual event final on the fourth of four days, she achieved a 1:04.15 in the 100-metre individual medley to place fifth. For the 100-metre butterfly later in the session, she won the gold medal with a personal best time of 1:00.21.

=== 2023 ===
At the 2023 Hungarian National Championships in April in Kaposvár, Molnár won a pair of bronze medals in backstroke events, the first in the 100-metre backstroke on day two with a 1:01.80 and the second in the 200-metre backstroke on day four with a 2:11.31.

== International championships (50 m) ==
Meet	100 free	100 back	200 back	4×100 free	4×200 free	4×100 medley	4×100 mixed free	4×100 mixed medley
Junior level
EJC 2021	16th			3rd place, bronze medalist(s)		4th		5th
EJC 2022	2nd place, silver medalist(s)	1st place, gold medalist(s)	1st place, gold medalist(s)	8th	1st place, gold medalist(s)	2nd place, silver medalist(s)	1st place, gold medalist(s)	
WJC 2022		1st place, gold medalist(s)	2nd place, silver medalist(s)	1st place, gold medalist(s)	1st place, gold medalist(s)	4th	1st place, gold medalist(s)	
Senior level
WC 2022			7th	8th	5th			
EC 2022		12th	3rd place, bronze medalist(s)	5th	(bronze) ^{[a]}		7th	

^{a} Molnár swam only in the prelims heats.

== Personal best times ==
=== Long course metres (50 m pool) ===
Event	Time	Meet	Location	Date	Status	Age	Ref
100 m freestyle	55.11	h, r	2022 European Junior Swimming Championships	Otopeni, Romania	5 July 2022	16	
200 m freestyle	1:59.91		2022 Hungarian Youth National Championships	Kaposvár	3 June 2022	15	
100 m backstroke	1:00.83		2022 Hungarian National Championships	Debrecen	21 April 2022	15	
200 m backstroke	2:09.34		2022 Hungarian National Championships	Debrecen	23 April 2022	15	

Legend: h – preliminaries heat; r – relay 1st leg

=== Short course metres (25 m pool) ===
Event	Time	Meet	Location	Date	Age	Ref
50 m freestyle	26.00	2022 Hungarian Junior National Short Course Championships	Szeged	8 December 2022	16	
100 m freestyle	54.20	2021 Hungarian National Short Course Championships	Kaposvár	13 November 2021	15	
200 m freestyle	1:58.93	2022 Hungarian National Short Course Championships	Kaposvár	18 November 2022	16	
50 m backstroke	28.33	2021 Hungarian National Short Course Championships	Kaposvár	12 November 2021	15	
100 m backstroke	59.08	2021 Hungarian National Short Course Championships	Kaposvár	11 November 2021	15	
200 m backstroke	2:06.10	2022 Hungarian National Short Course Championships	Kaposvár	19 November 2022	16	
50 m butterfly	27.64	2022 Hungarian Junior National Short Course Championships	Szeged	9 December 2022	16	
100 m butterfly	1:00.21	2022 Hungarian Junior National Short Course Championships	Szeged	10 December 2022	16	
200 m butterfly	2:13.40	2022 Hungarian Junior National Short Course Championships	Szeged	8 December 2022	16	
100 m individual medley	1:04.15	2022 Hungarian Junior National Short Course Championships	Szeged	10 December 2022	16	
200 m individual medley	2:15.21	2022 Hungarian Junior National Short Course Championships	Szeged	7 December 2022	16	

== Awards and honours ==
- M4 Sport, Hungarian Youth Athletes Performance of the Year (individual sports, women's team): 2022 (4×100-metre freestyle relay and 4×200-metre freestyle relay at the 2022 World Junior Championships)
- M4 Sport, Hungarian Youth Athletes Performance of the Year (individual sports, mixed team): 2022 (4×100-metre mixed freestyle relay at the 2022 World Junior Championships)
