= Minna Atherton =

Australian swimmer (born 2000)

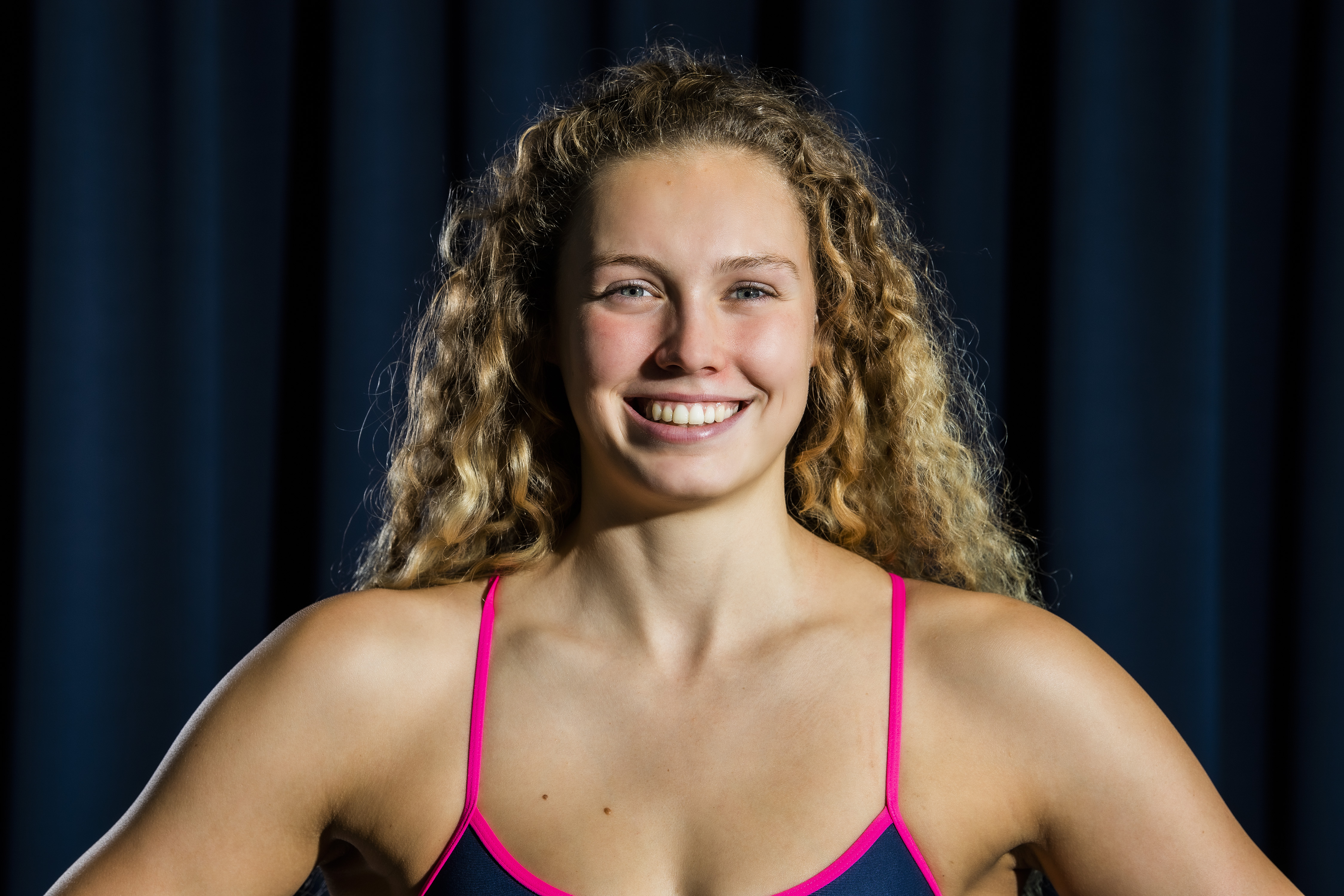
- Minna Atherton Bond University Gold Coast Australia pic: Cavan Flynn

Personal information
- National team: Australia
- Born: 17 May 2000 (age 26) Auchenflower, Queensland

Sport
- Sport: Swimming
- Strokes: Backstroke
- Club: Bond
- Coach: Chris Mooney
Medal record
Women's swimming
Representing Australia
World Championships (LC)
Gold medal – first place	2019 Gwangju	4×100 m mixed medley
Silver medal – second place	2019 Gwangju	100 m backstroke
Silver medal – second place	2019 Gwangju	4×100 m medley
World Championships (SC)
Bronze medal – third place	2018 Hangzhou	100 m backstroke
Bronze medal – third place	2018 Hangzhou	4×50 m freestyle
Bronze medal – third place	2018 Hangzhou	4×200 m freestyle
World Junior Championships
Gold medal – first place	2015 Singapore	100 m backstroke
Gold medal – first place	2015 Singapore	200 m backstroke
Gold medal – first place	2015 Singapore	4×100 m freestyle
Silver medal – second place	2015 Singapore	50 m backstroke
Silver medal – second place	2015 Singapore	4×100 m medley
Silver medal – second place	2015 Singapore	4×100 m mixed medley
Junior Pan Pacific Championships
Gold medal – first place	2016 Maui	100 m backstroke
Bronze medal – third place	2016 Maui	200 m backstroke
Bronze medal – third place	2016 Maui	4×100 m freestyle
Bronze medal – third place	2016 Maui	4×100 m medley

Minna Atherton (born 17 May 2000) is an Australian competitive swimmer who won the gold medals in the 100- and 200-metre backstroke events at the 2015 FINA World Junior Swimming Championships in Singapore. She tied the junior world record (held by American Claire Adams) in the 100-metre backstroke and broke the Championships record in the 200-metre backstroke.

In December 2015 at the Queensland State Swimming Championships in Brisbane, she broke the junior world record in the 100-metre backstroke with a time of 59.37. Two months later, in February 2016, she twice broke the junior world record in the 50-metre backstroke at the Brisbane Sprint Championships. In the heats she swam 27.73, followed by 27.49 in the final.

In April 2016, Atherton did not qualify for the 2016 Summer Olympics. Her best result at the Australian trials was a third-place finish in the 100-meter backstroke behind Emily Seebohm, who trains at the same club as Atherton, and Madison Wilson. Seebohm and Wilson were the gold and silver medalists in this event at the 2015 World Aquatics Championships.

In 2018 she took part in the 2018 Gold Coast Commonwealth Games and took part in the 50M Backstroke event, but did not reach the final.

== International Swimming League ==
Atherton is a member of the London Roar team, competing in the International Swimming League (ISL). The ISL is an annual professional swimming league featuring a team-based competition format with fast-paced race sessions. 12 teams featuring the world's best swimmers competed for the ISL title in 2021. During the 2019 International Swimming League season Atherton was the leading female backstroker in the league, winning ten of the twelve backstroke events she contested for the London Roar. Atherton was also the first person to break a world record while swimming an ISL race when she clocked 54.89 to win a 100-metre backstroke race at Budapest in October 2019.

== World records ==
=== Short course metres ===
No.	Event	Time	Meet	Location	Date	Status	Ref
1	100 m backstroke	54.89	2019 International Swimming League	Budapest, Hungary	27 October 2019	Former	

Records
Preceded by Katinka Hosszú	Women's 100 backstroke world record holder (short course); 27 October 2019 – present	Succeeded by Kaylee McKeown
