= Zuzanna Herasimowicz =

Polish swimmer (born 2002)

Personal information
- Nationality: Polish
- Born: 7 July 2002 (age 22)

Sport
- Sport: Swimming

Zuzanna Herasimowicz (born 7 July 2002) is a Polish swimmer. She competed in the women's 200 metre backstroke at the 2019 World Aquatics Championships.
