= Kathleen Dawson =

Scottish swimmer (born 1997)

Kathleen Dawson MBE
Personal information
- Full name: Kathleen Mary Dawson
- Born: 3 October 1997 (age 29) Kirkcaldy, Fife, Scotland
- Height: 173 cm (5 ft 8 in)
- Weight: 64 kg (141 lb)

Sport
- Sport: Swimming
- Strokes: Backstroke
- Club: Warrington Warriors
- College team: University of Stirling
- Coach: Bradley Hay, Steven Tigg
Medal record
Representing Great Britain
Olympic Games
Gold medal – first place	2020 Tokyo	4×100 m mixed medley
European Championships (LC)
Gold medal – first place	2016 London	4×100 m medley
Gold medal – first place	2020 Budapest	100 m backstroke
Gold medal – first place	2020 Budapest	4×100 m medley
Gold medal – first place	2020 Budapest	4×100 m mixed medley
Silver medal – second place	2020 Budapest	50 m backstroke
Bronze medal – third place	2016 London	100 m backstroke
Bronze medal – third place	2018 Glasgow	4×100 m medley
European Junior Championships
Silver medal – second place	2013 Poznan	50 m backstroke
Silver medal – second place	2013 Poznan	100 m backstroke

Kathleen Mary Dawson (born 3 October 1997) is a Scottish backstroke swimmer. She won gold at the 2020 Tokyo Olympics in mixed 4 × 100 metre medley relay in a world record time. She is also the European champion at the 2020 Budapest Championships and a former holder of the European record in 100 m backstroke (58.08).

== Career ==
Dawson has represented Scotland at the Commonwealth Games since 2014. She represented Great Britain at the 2016 European Aquatics Championships, and won a bronze medal in 100 metre backstroke. She also won a gold in the 4 × 100 metre medley relay.

In May 2021, at the European championships held in Budapest, Dawson won gold in the 100 metres backstroke. As a result of a technical error, she had to swim twice in the final, but won on both occasions. She also won gold in 4x100m medley and mixed medley relay, and silver in 50 m backstroke at the same Championships.

Dawson was named a member of the British team to go to the postponed 2020 Olympics in April 2021. This would be her first Olympics where she would join more experienced Olympians like Aimee Willmott and Molly Renshaw.

At the Tokyo Olympics, Dawson raced in the backstroke lead-off leg of the final of the mixed 4 × 100 metre medley relay, winning gold and setting a world record time of 3 minutes 37.58 seconds together with Adam Peaty, James Guy and Anna Hopkin.

Dawson was announced as an Observatory for Sport in Scotland ambassador, where she helps spotlight the benefits of community sport for all ages and abilities, and she finished 2021 being voted 'Sportswoman of the Year' at the Scottish Women in Sport Awards, held in Glasgow in November, where she pipped fellow nominees Katie Archibald and Laura Muir to the coveted title.

Dawson was appointed Member of the Order of the British Empire (MBE) in the 2022 New Year Honours for services to swimming and women in sport.

After winning the 100 metres backstroke at the 2024 Aquatics GB Swimming Championships, Dawson sealed her place at the 2024 Summer Olympics. At the 2024 Olympic Games in Paris, she participated in the women's 100 metre backstroke competition, where she was eliminated in the heats.
