= Karoline Sørensen =

Danish swimmer (born 2002)

Personal information
- Nationality: Danish
- Born: 19 February 2002 (age 24)

Sport
- Sport: Swimming
- Club: Thisted svømme klub
Medal record
European Championships (LC)
Silver medal – second place	2024 Belgrade	4 × 100 m freestyle

Karoline Sørensen (born 19 February 2002) is a Danish swimmer. She competed in the mixed 4 × 100 metre medley relay at the 2020 Summer Olympics.
