= Jade Smits =

Belgian swimmer (born 2001)

Personal information
- Nationality: Belgian
- Born: 12 May 2001 (age 25)

Sport
- Sport: Swimming

Jade Smits (born 12 May 2001) is a Belgian backstroke swimmer. She competed in the women's 50 metre backstroke event at the 2020 European Aquatics Championships, in Budapest, Hungary.
