= Ali Galyer =

New Zealand swimmer (born 1998)

Personal information
- Nationality: New Zealand
- Born: 19 June 1998 (age 28) Brisbane, Queensland, Australia

Sport
- Sport: Swimming
- College team: Kentucky Wildcats

Ali Galyer (born 19 June 1998) is a New Zealand swimmer. Born in Australia before moving to USA when she was three, she had never lived in New Zealand. Her New Zealand citizenship comes from her father. She went to the University of Kentucky where she studied marketing. After she finished at Kentucky, she moved to New Zealand to live and train with the Coast Swim Club elite team.

She competed in the 200 Backstroke, 100 backstroke and 4x200 Freestyle Relay at the 2020 Tokyo Olympics. She also competed in the women's 200 metre backstroke at the 2019 World Aquatics Championships.
