= Aviv Barzelay =

Israeli swimmer (born 2002)

Aviv Barzelay אביב ברזלי
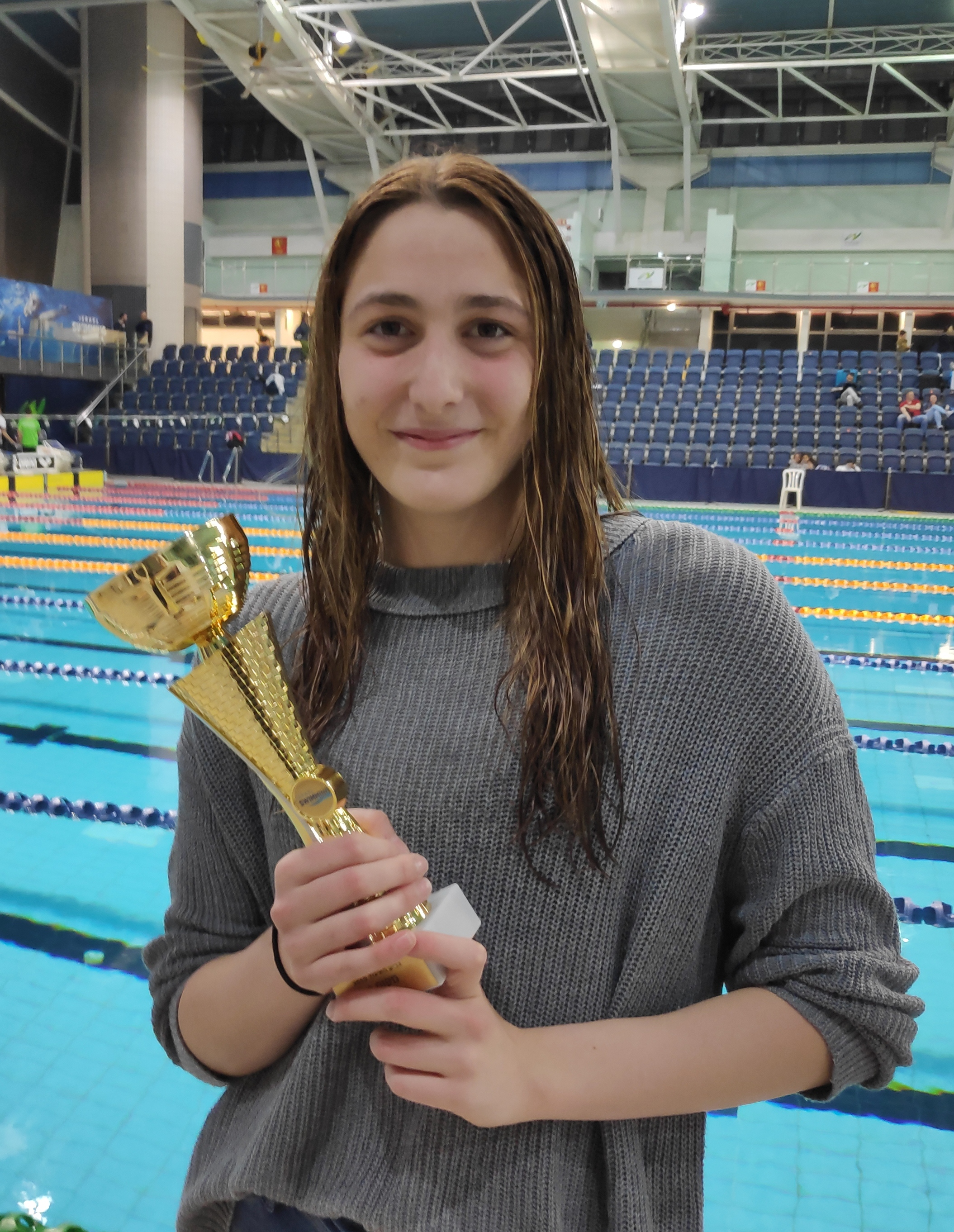
- Barzelay in 2019

Personal information
- Full name: Aviv Barzelay
- Nationality: Israel
- Born: 28 May 2002 (age 24) Mitzpe Aviv, Israel

Sport
- Sport: Swimming
- Strokes: backstroke, freestyle, butterfly, medley
- Club: Maccabi Haifa
- College team: Texas A&M University
Medal record
Women's swimming
Representing Israel
European U23 Championships
Gold medal – first place	2023 Dublin	200 m backstroke

Aviv Barzelay (Hebrew: אביב ברזלי; born 28 May 2002) is an Israeli Olympic swimmer. She represented Israel at the 2020 Summer Olympics in the Women's 200m backstroke event, and came in 15th. At the 2023 European U23 Championships, she won the gold medal in the 200 L backstroke. Barzelay represented Israel at the 2024 Paris Olympics in swimming in the 200 metre backstroke, and the 200 metre individual medley.

== Early life ==
Barzelay was born and raised in Mitzpe Aviv, Israel, in the Galilee, to a Jewish family. Her parents are Mirit (a former nurse who works in nursing department management at Rambam Hospital in Haifa) and Yuval (who manages food factories). Her eldest sister was a soccer referee, another sister played volleyball, her mother played netball, and her father ran marathons and then switched to cycling. Her older brother Alon died when she was 15 years old.

== Early career ==
By the time she was three months old, Barzelay had already learned to swim. She attended the Wingate Institute in 2017–18. Her club is Maccabi Haifa.

In July 2019, at the 2019 European Junior Swimming Championships in Kazan, Russia, Barzelay came in 5th in the 200 L backstroke, with a time of 2:12.01. In August 2019, at the 2019 FINA World Junior Swimming Championships in Budapest, Hungary, she came in 8th in the 200 L back with a time of 2:14.37. In November 2019, she won the gold medal in the Kevin Perry Senior Invitational in La Mirada, California, in the 100 L back with a time of 1:03.50, and a bronze medal in the 100 Y back with a time of 55.32 against 231 competitors. In December 2019, she won the silver medal in the Swim Cup Amsterdam in the Netherlands, in the 200 LCM back, with a time of 2:13.44, behind gold medal winner África Zamorano of Spain.

In July 2020 in Netanya, Israel, Barzelay competed in the 2020 Coronavirus Days Competition. She swam the women's 100m backstroke in a time of 59.42 in the short course race to win the gold medal, becoming Israel's first-ever youth swimmer to break the minute barrier, surpassing the previous national junior record of 1:00.15 that Anastasia Gorbenko had set in 2018. In August 2020, she set a new Israeli national record in the women's 200m back with a time of 2:06.97.

In December 2020, Barzelay won the silver medal in the Rotterdam Qualification Meet in the Netherlands, in the 200 L with a time of 2:12.78, 0.83 seconds behind gold medal winner Lena Grabowski of Austria.

== 2020 Tokyo Olympics ==
Barzelay was invited to represent Israel at the 2020 Summer Olympics after breaking the Israeli record in the 200-meter backstroke event in a championship in Rome, and achieving the FINA ‘B’ cut in the 200 backstroke. She competed in the Women's 200m backstroke event, and swam it in 2:11.13, qualifying for the semi-finals, where she came in 15th with a time of 2:12.93.

== College years ==
=== 2021–22; Israeli national championships ===
Barzelay is a student at Texas A&M University, where she studies business administration, and a member of its Aggies swimming team.

In April 2021, Barzelay won the bronze medal at the Malmsten Swim Open Stockholm in Sweden in the 200 back with a time of 2:10.86, 0.22 seconds behind silver medal winner Lena Grabowski of Austria. In June 2021 at the Internazionali di Nuoto - 58 Settecolli in Rome, Italy, at 19 years of age she won the silver medal in the 200 back with a time of 2:10.76, two seconds behind Italian former 3-time European champion Margherita Panziera. She split 1:03.32/1:07.44, breaking the previous Israeli record of 2:10.86 established by Anastasia Gorbenko earlier in the year.

In 2021–22, in her freshman year, at the NCAA Championships Barzelay finished sixth in the 200 back (1:53.77), and 17th in the 100 back (53.06), while also competing on the 200 and 400 medley relay teams at her first SEC Championships. She had times of 50.52 in the 100 freestyle, 1:49.99 in the 200 free, 54.10 in the 100 back, and 1:55.93 in the 200 back at the Art Adamson Invite. She earned College Swimming Coaches Association of America (CSCAA) Scholar All-America honors.

In May 2022 Barzelay competed at the Trofeu Internacional Ciutat de Barcelona / Mare Nostrum in Sant Andreu, Spain, and won the bronze medal in the 200 L back with a time of 2:11.68. That month she also competed at the Israel Swimming Cup in Netanya, and won the 200 backstroke in a 2:11.46. In June 2022 she came in 9th at the 19th FINA World Championships in Budapest, Hungary, in the 200 L back with a time of 2:10.42. In August 2022 at the 2022 Israeli Summer Championships she won gold medals in the backstroke with times of 29.02 in the 50m, 1:01.62 in the 100m, and 2:12.39 in the 200m.

=== 2023–present; European U23 Championship and Israeli national championships ===
In her sophomore year, at the 2023 NCAA Division I Women's Swimming and Diving Championships in the 100 back Barzelay swam 53.45. She had times of 1:48.21 in the 200 free and 1:52.91 in the 200 back at SEC Championships.

Internationally, Barzelay competed at FINA World Championships, the Israeli Championships, and the LEN European Championships. In June 2023 at the 2023 Israeli Championships, she won the women's 100m back with a time of 1:01.91, and won the women's 200m back in a time of 2:11.30.

At the 2023 European U23 Championships held in August in Dublin, Ireland, Barzelay won the gold medal in the 200L back with a time of 2:11.35.

In 2023–24, in her junior year, at the 2024 NCAA Division I Women's Swimming and Diving Championships, Barzelay had a time of 53.28 in the 100 back. In the 200 back she had a time of 1:52.89 and came in fifth at the SEC Championships. She had times of 50.66 in the 100 free, 53.86 in the 100 back, and 1:54.61 in the 200 back at the Art Adamson Invite. In the 2023–24 season, she was ranked 18th in the world in the 200 back on the basis of two swimmers per country.

In June 2024 at the 2024 Israeli Olympic Trials at the Wingate Institute in Netanya, Barzelay qualified for the 2024 Paris Olympics as she set a new personal best in the women's 200m backstroke with a time of 2:09.63. She said: "In these difficult days I just want to wish for the return of all the abductees, and for all our soldiers to return safely."

== 2024 Paris Olympics ==
Barzelay represented Israel at the 2024 Paris Olympics in swimming in the 200 metre backstroke, and the 200 metre individual medley.

== Career highlights ==
Event	Time	Medal	Pool Length	Age*	Competition	Comp Country	Date
Women 100 Freestyle	50.52	-	25m		Art Adamson Invitational	USA	11/19/2021
Women 200 Freestyle	1:48.21	-	25m		SEC Championships	USA	2/16/2023
Women 50 Backstroke	28.98	-	25m		LEN European Short Course Swimming Championships	Scotland	12/7/2019
Women 100 Backstroke	53.06	-	25m		SEC Championships (21–22)	USA	2022
Women 200 Backstroke	1:52.89	-	25m		SEC Championships	USA	2/24/2024
Women 200 Medley	2:02.38	-	25m		Texas A&M vs. Houston vs. Southern Methodist	USA	2/25/2022
Women 50 Freestyle	26.97	-	50m		Art Adamson Invitational	USA	11/15/2023
Women 100 Freestyle	57.44	-	50m		Israel National Summer Trial and Championships	Israel	6/14/2021
Women 200 Freestyle	2:05.34	-	50m		2022 GU Aggieland April LC Invitational	USA	4/23/2022
Women 50 Backstroke	29.35		50m		Trofeu Internacional Ciutat de Barcelona / Mare Nostrum	Spain	5/25/2022
Women 100 Backstroke	1:01.61		50m		TYR Pro Swim Series - San Antonio	USA	4/1/2022
Women 200 Backstroke	2:10.42		50m		19th FINA World Championships	Hungary	6/23/2022
Women 50 Butterfly	30.66	-	50m		TYR Pro Swim Series Greensboro	USA	11/9/2019
Women 200 Medley	2:21.99	Bronze	50m		Israel Cup	Israel	4/3/2019
Women 4x100 Medley Relay	4:14.63	-	50m	-	European Junior Swimming Championships 2019	Russia	7/5/2019

== See also ==
- List of Israeli records in swimming
