= Cassie Wild =

British swimmer

Personal information
- Full name: Cassie Wild-Richards
- Nationality: British
- Born: 12 June 2000 (age 26) Edinburgh, Scotland

Sport
- Sport: Swimming
Medal record
European Championships (LC)
| Gold medal – first place | 2020 Budapest | 4×100 m medley |
| Silver medal – second place | 2020 Budapest | 200 m backstroke |

Cassie Wild (born 12 June 2000) is a retired British swimmer. She competed in the women's 50 metre backstroke event at the 2020 European Aquatics Championships, in Budapest, Hungary.

Wild is from Chester and she is a student at the University of Stirling. Wild was named as a member of the British team to go to the postponed 2020 Olympics in April 2021. This would be her first Olympics where she would join an "exceptionally high quality team" including more experienced British Olympians including Aimee Willmott and Molly Renshaw.
