= Ugnė Mažutaitytė =

Lithuanian swimmer (born 1997)

Personal information
- Born: 14 March 1997 (age 29)

Sport
- Sport: Swimming
- Strokes: Backstroke
Medal record
Women's swimming
Representing Lithuania
Baltic States Championships
| Gold medal – first place | 2021 Klaipėda | 50 m backstroke |
| Gold medal – first place | 2021 Klaipėda | 100 m backstroke |
| Gold medal – first place | 2021 Klaipėda | 200 m backstroke |
European Junior Championships
| Silver medal – second place | 2013 Poznań | 200 m backstroke |

Ugnė Mažutaitytė (born 14 March 1997) is a Lithuanian swimmer. She competed in the women's 100 metre backstroke event at the 2017 World Aquatics Championships. In 2019, she represented Lithuania at the 2019 World Aquatics Championships in Gwangju, South Korea. She competed in the women's 200 metre backstroke event and she did not advance to the semi-finals.

On 3 August 2022 Mažutaitytė announced her retirement from professional sport.
