= Aleksa Gold =

Estonian swimmer

Personal information
- Nationality: Estonian
- Born: 3 January 2000 (age 26)

Sport
- Sport: Swimming

Aleksa Gold (born 3 January 2000) is an Estonian swimmer. She competed in the women's 200 metre freestyle at the 2019 World Aquatics Championships and she did not advance to compete in the semi-finals.
