= Nina Kost =

Swiss swimmer

Personal information
- Nationality: Swiss
- Born: 17 April 1995 (age 31)

Sport
- Sport: Swimming
- Club: Lancy Natation

Nina Kost (born 17 April 1995) is a Swiss swimmer. She competed in the women's 50 metre freestyle and women's 100 metre backstroke events at the 2019 World Aquatics Championships held in Gwangju, South Korea. In both events she did not advance to compete in the semi-finals. She also competed in two women's relay events, without winning a medal.
