= Margherita Panziera =

Italian swimmer (born 1995)

Personal information
- National team: Italy
- Born: 12 August 1995 (age 30) Montebelluna, Italy
- Height: 180 cm (5 ft 11 in)
- Weight: 65 kg (143 lb)

Sport
- Sport: Swimming
- Strokes: Backstroke
- Club: G.S. Fiamme Oro; Circolo Canottieri Aniene
- Coach: Gianluca Belfiore
Medal record
Women's swimming
Representing Italy
Event	1st	2nd	3rd
World Championships (SC)	0	0	1
European Championships (LC)	4	2	3
European Championships (SC)	1	1	1
Mediterranean Games	4	0	0
Total	9	3	5
World Championships (SC)
Bronze medal – third place	2018 Hangzhou	4×100 m medley
European Championships (LC)
Gold medal – first place	2018 Glasgow	200 m backstroke
Gold medal – first place	2020 Budapest	200 m backstroke
Gold medal – first place	2022 Rome	100 m backstroke
Gold medal – first place	2022 Rome	200 m backstroke
Silver medal – second place	2020 Budapest	100 m backstroke
Silver medal – second place	2020 Budapest	4×200 m mixed freestyle
Bronze medal – third place	2018 Glasgow	4×100 m mixed medley
Bronze medal – third place	2020 Budapest	4×100 m mixed medley
Bronze medal – third place	2020 Budapest	4×100 m medley
European Championships (SC)
Gold medal – first place	2019 Glasgow	200 m backstroke
Silver medal – second place	2021 Kazan	200 m backstroke
Bronze medal – third place	2017 Copenhagen	200 m backstroke
Mediterranean Games
Gold medal – first place	2018 Tarragona	100 m backstroke
Gold medal – first place	2018 Tarragona	200 m backstroke
Gold medal – first place	2018 Tarragona	4×100 m medley
Gold medal – first place	2018 Tarragona	4×200 m freestyle

Margherita Panziera (born 12 August 1995) is an Italian swimmer. She competed at the 2020 Summer Olympics, in 100 m backstroke and 200 m backstroke. She is also a three-time European Champion in the 200 metre backstroke, winning in 2018, 2021, and 2022.

== Career ==
In 2015, at the World Championships in Kazan, in the 200 m backstroke competition, she took 10th place, with a time of 2:09.5. A year later, during the Olympic Games in Rio de Janeiro, in 200 m backstroke, she took 17th place with a time of 2:10.92. In July 2017, at the 200 m World Championships in Budapest, the backstroke was the fourteenth (2:10.95). In the eliminations of 100 m, backstroke, she achieved the time 1:01.03 and took 20th place, not qualifying for the semi-finals. In December of the same year, during the European Championships at the short course (25 m) in Copenhagen, she won the bronze medal over the distance of 200 m backstroke and set a new record for Italy with time 2:02.43.

In August 2018, at the European Championships in Glasgow, she won the 200 m backstroke competition, with a time of 2: 06.18 minutes. Panziera improved both the records of the championship and her country. In a distance twice as short, she took fifth place (59.71). In 2020 she qualified to represent Italy at the 2020 Summer Olympics. At the 2021 European Aquatics Championships she won five medals, a gold, two silver and two bronze.

At the 2022 European Aquatics Championships, held in Rome in August, Panziera won the gold medal in the 200 metre backstroke with a time of 2:07.13. Four days later, with a time of 59.40 seconds, she won the gold medal in the 100 metre backstroke.

== National records ==
Individual long course

- 100 m backstroke: 58.92 (Riccione, Italy, 4 April 2019) - current holder
- 200 m backstroke: 2:05.56 (Riccione, Italy, 31 March 2021) - current holder

== Achievements ==
Competition	Edition	50 m back	100 m back	200 m back	4×50 m mix	4×100 m mix	4×100 m mix med	4×200 m free
Summer Olympics	(Brazil) Rio de Janeiro 2016	-	-	17th 2:10.92 (heats)	-	-	-	-
World Championships	(Russia) Kazan 2015	-	37th 1:02.17 (heats)	10th 2:09.54 (SF)	-	-	-	-
World Championships	(Hungary) Budapest 2017	-	20th 1:01.03 (heats)	14th 2:10.95 (SF)	-	8th 3:59.98 (Note: leg: 1:01.12)	7th 3:46.75 (heats) (Note: leg: 1:01.03)	-
World Championships	(South Korea) Gwangju 2019	-	11th 59.83 (SF)	4th 2:06.67	-	4th 3:56.50 (Note: leg: 59.77)	6th 3:44.38 (heats) (Note: leg: 1:00.19)	-
World Championships	(Hungary) Budapest 2022	-	11th 1:00.26 (SF)	4th 2:07.27	-	7th 3:58.26 (Note: leg: 1:00.35)	-	-
World Championships (25 m)	(China) Hangzhou 2018	-	15th 58.31 (SF)	5th 2:02.50	8th 1:46.44 (Note: leg: 24.48)	Bronze; 3:51.38 (Note: leg: 58.39) NR	-	6th 7:43.18 (Note: leg: 1:56.71)
World Championships (25 m)	(United Arab Emirates) Abu Dhabi 2021	-	15th 58.46 (Heats)	5th 2:03.20	-	-	-	-
European Championships	(United Kingdom) London 2016	19th 29.21 (heats)	14th 1:01.45 (heats)	9th 2:11.80 (SF)	-	-	-	-
European Championships	(United Kingdom) Glasgow 2018	-	5th 59.71	Gold; 2:06.18 CR	-	-	Bronze; 3:44.85 (Note: leg: 1:00.11)	5th 7:32.37 (Note: leg: 1:59.76)
European Championships	(Hungary) Budapest 2021	-	Silver; 59.01	Gold; 2:06.08	Bronze; 3:56.30	-	Bronze; 3:42.30	Silver; 7:29.35 (Note: leg: 2:00.57)
European Championships	(Italy) Roma 2022	-	Gold; 59.40	Gold; 2:07.13	-	-	-	-
European Championships (25 m)	(Israel) Netanya 2015	32nd 28.49 (heats)	13th 59.24 (SF)	7th 2:05.60	-	-	-	-
European Championships (25 m)	(Denmark) Copenaghen 2017	-	11th 58.19 (heats)	Bronze; 2:02.43	-	-	-	-
European Championships (25 m)	(United Kingdom) Glasgow 2019	-	6th 57.45	Gold; 2:01.45 NR	-	-	-	-
European Championships (25 m)	(Russia) Kazan 2021	-	-	Silver; 2:02.05	-	-	-	-
Universiade	(China) Taipei 2017	-	12th 1:01.56 (SF)	5th 2:10.34	-	-	-	-
Mediterranean Games	(Turkey) 2013 Mersin	-	Bronze; 1:01.86	Silver; 2:12.86	-	Gold; 4:11.36 (heats)	-	-
Mediterranean Games	(Spain) Tarragona 2018	-	Gold; 1:00.74 CR	Gold; 2:08.08	-	Gold; 3:58.27 CR (Note: leg: 1:00.54)	-	Gold; 8:02.63

== See also ==
- Italy national swimming team – Women multiple medalists
- List of Italian records in swimming
