= Laura Bernat =

Polish swimmer (born 2005)

Personal information
- Nationality: Polish
- Born: 28 September 2005 (age 20)

Sport
- Sport: Swimming
- Strokes: Backstroke
Medal record
Representing Poland
World Junior Championships
Gold medal – first place	2022 Lima	4×100 m mixed medley
Bronze medal – third place	2022 Lima	200 m backstroke
Bronze medal – third place	2022 Lima	4×100 m medley
European Junior Championships
Gold medal – first place	2021 Rome	200 m backstroke

Laura Bernat (born 28 September 2005) is a Polish swimmer. She competed in the women's 50 metre backstroke event at the 2020 European Aquatics Championships, in Budapest, Hungary. She won gold at the 200 metre backstroke event in the 2021 European Junior Swimming Championships with a time of 2:10.14.
