= África Zamorano =

Spanish swimmer (born 1998)

Personal information
- Full name: África Zamorano Sanz
- Born: 11 January 1998 (age 28) Barcelona, Spain

Sport
- Sport: Swimming
Medal record
Representing Spain
European Championships (LC)
Silver medal – second place	2016 London	4×200 m freestyle
Mediterranean Games
Silver medal – second place	2018 Tarragona	200 m backstroke
Silver medal – second place	2022 Oran	200 m backstroke
Silver medal – second place	2022 Oran	4×100 m medley
Bronze medal – third place	2018 Tarragona	4×200 m freestyle
European Junior Championships
Bronze medal – third place	2013 Poznań	4×200 m freestyle
World Junior Championships
Bronze medal – third place	2015 Singapore	400 m medley
Youth Olympic Games
Bronze medal – third place	2014 Nanjing	200 m backstroke

África Zamorano Sanz (Note: In this Spanish name, the first or paternal surname is Zamorano and the second or maternal family name is Sanz.) (born 11 January 1998) is a Spanish swimmer. She competed in the women's 200 metre individual medley event at the 2016 Summer Olympics. She competed in the women's 200 metre individual medley, 200 metre backstroke, and 4 × 100 metre medley relay at the 2020 Summer Olympics in Tokyo, Japan.
