= Katalin Burián =

Hungarian swimmer (born 1995)

Kata Burián
Personal information
- Full name: Katalin Burián
- Nationality: Hungarian
- Born: 17 January 1995 (age 31) Budapest, Hungary

Sport
- Sport: Swimming
- Strokes: Backstroke
- Club: A Jövő SC (2001–12); Újpesti TE (2012–14); Bácsvíz KVSC (2014–16); Egri ÚK (2016–18); BVSC-Zugló (2019– )
- Coach: Zsolt Plagányi
Medal record
European Championships (LC)
Bronze medal – third place	2018 Glasgow	200 m backstroke
Bronze medal – third place	2020 Budapest	200 m backstroke

Katalin Burián (born 17 January 1995) is a Hungarian swimmer. She competed in the women's 200 metre backstroke event at the 2017 World Aquatics Championships, placing 10th.
