= Ingeborg Løyning =

Norwegian swimmer

Personal information
- Full name: Ingeborg Vassbakk Løyning
- Born: 13 September 2000 (age 25) Tromsø, Norway
- Height: 172 cm (5 ft 8 in)
- Spouse: Kyle Chalmers (m. 2026)

Sport
- Sport: Swimming
- Strokes: Backstroke
- Club: Oslo idrettslag

Ingeborg Vassbakk Løyning (born 13 September 2000) is a Norwegian swimmer. She competed in the women's 100 metre backstroke at the 2019 World Aquatics Championships held in Gwangju, South Korea.

Coming from Narvik, she moved to Bærum at age 16 to attend the Norwegian School of Elite Sport She moved to Adelaide, Australia in 2022 to train. In 2026, she married Australian swimmer and Olympic gold medalist Kyle Chalmers.
