= Lena Grabowski =

Austrian swimmer

Personal information
- Nationality: Austrian
- Born: 10 September 2002 (age 23)

Sport
- Sport: Swimming
Medal record
Women's swimming
Representing Austria
European Championships (SC)
Bronze medal – third place	2021 Kazan	200 m backstroke

Lena Grabowski (born 10 September 2002) is an Austrian swimmer. She competed in the women's 200 metre backstroke at the 2019 World Aquatics Championships. In 2021, she competed in the 2020 Olympics.
