= Tatiana Salcuțan =

Moldovan swimmer (born 2001)

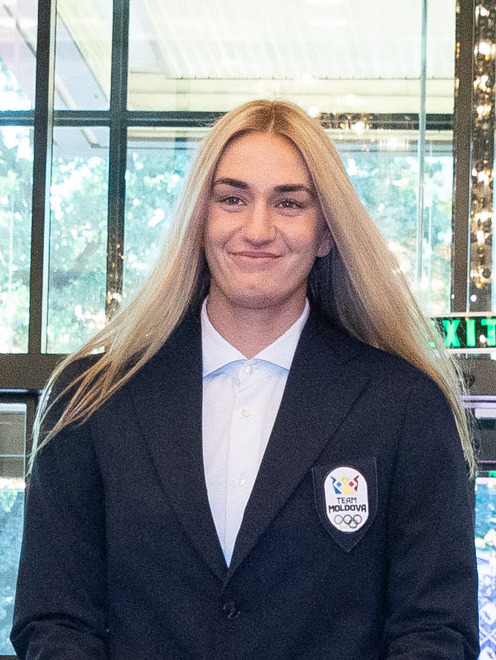
- Salcuțan in 2024

Personal information
- Born: 16 April 2001 (age 25) Tiraspol, Moldova
- Height: 180 cm (5 ft 11 in)
- Weight: 60 kg (132 lb)

Sport
- Sport: Swimming
- Strokes: Backstroke
Medal record
Summer Youth Olympics
Gold medal – first place	2018 Buenos Aires	200 m backstroke

Tatiana Salcuțan (born 16 April 2001) is a Moldovan swimmer. She competed at the 2020 Summer Olympics.

== Career ==
In 2015, she won the silver medal at the European Youth Olympic Festival. and went on to win the silver medal at the Youth Swimming European Championships, which took place in Hódmezővásárhely, Hungary in 2016. She competed at the 2018 Summer Youth Olympics, winning a gold medal.

She competed in the women's 100 metre backstroke event at the 2017 World Aquatics Championships.
