= 2021 FINA World Swimming Championships (25 m) – Women's 100 metre backstroke =

Swimming competition

Women's 100 metre backstroke at the 2021 FINA World Swimming Championships (25 m)
- Venue: Etihad Arena
- Location: Abu Dhabi, United Arab Emirates
- Dates: 16 December (heats and semifinals); 17 December (final)
- Competitors: 49 from 43 nations
- Winning time: 55.20

Medalists
gold medal	Louise Hansson	Sweden
silver medal	Kylie Masse	Canada
bronze medal	Katharine Berkoff	United States

The Women's 100 metre backstroke competition of the 2021 FINA World Swimming Championships (25 m) was held on 16 and 17 December 2021.

== Records ==
Prior to the competition, the existing world and championship records were as follows.

World record	Minna Atherton (AUS)	54.89	Budapest, Hungary	26 November 2021
Competition record	Katinka Hosszú (HUN)	55.03	Doha, Qatar	4 December 2014

== Results ==
=== Heats ===
The heats were started on 16 December at 11:51.

Rank	Heat	Lane	Name	Nationality	Time	Notes
1	4	7	Katharine Berkoff	United States	55.92	Q
2	5	4	Kira Toussaint	Netherlands	55.95	Q
3	4	4	Kylie Masse	Canada	56.12	Q
4	5	5	Louise Hansson	Sweden	56.41	Q
5	5	7	Rhyan White	United States	56.76	Q
6	4	3	Simona Kubová	Czech Republic	57.06	Q
7	3	3	Anastasiya Shkurdai	Belarus	57.07	Q
8	3	4	Maaike de Waard	Netherlands	57.09	Q
9	3	1	Wan Letian	China	57.36	Q
10	4	5	Maggie Mac Neil	Canada	57.42	Q
11	5	0	Holly Barratt	Australia	57.72	Q
12	3	7	Peng Xuwei	China	57.82	Q
13	4	6	Silvia Scalia	Italy	58.05	Q
14	3	6	Hanna Rosvall	Sweden	58.33	Q
15	4	1	Anastasia Gorbenko	Israel	58.39	Q
16	1	7	Caroline Pilhatsch	Austria	58.43	Q, NR
17	5	3	Margherita Panziera	Italy	58.46	
18	4	2	Ekaterina Avramova	Turkey	58.54	
19	3	5	Analia Pigrée	France	58.63	
20	5	2	Daria Ustinova	Russian Swimming Federation	59.15	
21	5	6	Daryna Zevina	Ukraine	59.36	
22	3	8	Stephanie Au	Hong Kong	59.58	
23	5	8	Laura Riedemann	Germany	59.64	
24	4	0	Nina Kost	Switzerland	59.76	
25	3	2	Danielle Hill	Ireland	59.87	
26	4	8	Gabriela Georgieva	Bulgaria	59.94	
27	5	9	Eszter Szabó-Feltóthy	Hungary	1:00.27	
28	5	1	Janja Šegel	Slovenia	1:00.30	
29	3	9	Chloe Isleta	Philippines	1:00.42	NR
30	2	4	Andrea Becali	Cuba	1:01.25	NR
31	2	5	Sarah Szklaruk	Chile	1:01.36	NR
32	2	6	Mia Blaževska Eminova	North Macedonia	1:01.63	
33	3	0	Elisabeth Erlendsdóttir	Faroe Islands	1:02.40	
34	2	3	Ridhima Veerendrakumar	India	1:03.29	
35	2	8	Catarina Sousa	Angola	1:04.12	NR
36	1	8	Leiya Istanbouli	Lebanon	1:05.69	
37	2	1	Ganga Senavirathne	Sri Lanka	1:06.06	
38	1	1	Arianis Martínez	Panama	1:06.72	
39	2	0	Salome Nikolaishvili	Georgia	1:06.97	
40	1	3	Leilaa Al-Khatib	United Arab Emirates	1:07.79	
41	1	2	Erina Idrizaj	Kosovo	1:08.47	
42	1	4	Bisma Khan	Pakistan	1:08.55	
43	2	7	Noor Yussuf Abdulla	Bahrain	1:08.72	
44	2	9	Lindsay Barr	United States Virgin Islands	1:10.07	
45	1	9	Kevern da Silva	Saint Vincent and the Grenadines	1:10.71	
46	1	5	Jennifer Harding-Marlin	Saint Kitts and Nevis	1:11.63	
47	1	0	Patrice Mahaica	Guyana	1:12.24	
48	1	6	Aishath Sausan	Maldives	1:14.03	NR
	2	2	Elizabeth Jiménez	Dominican Republic	DSQ	
	4	9	McKenna DeBever	Peru	DNS	

=== Semifinals ===
The semifinals were started on 16 December at 19:16.

Rank	Heat	Lane	Name	Nationality	Time	Notes
1	1	5	Louise Hansson	Sweden	55.85	Q, NR
2	1	4	Kira Toussaint	Netherlands	56.05	Q
2	2	3	Rhyan White	United States	56.05	Q
4	2	5	Kylie Masse	Canada	56.07	Q
5	2	4	Katharine Berkoff	United States	56.10	Q
6	2	6	Anastasiya Shkurdai	Belarus	56.65	Q, NR
7	1	6	Maaike de Waard	Netherlands	56.72	Q
8	1	3	Simona Kubová	Czech Republic	57.26	Q
9	2	7	Peng Xuwei	China	57.36	
10	1	1	Anastasia Gorbenko	Israel	57.45	NR
10	2	2	Wan Letian	China	57.45	
12	1	2	Holly Barratt	Australia	57.59	
13	1	7	Silvia Scalia	Italy	57.62	
14	2	1	Hanna Rosvall	Sweden	57.91	
15	1	8	Maggie Mac Neil	Canada	58.13	
16	2	8	Caroline Pilhatsch	Austria	59.46	

=== Final ===
The final was held on 17 December at 19:35.

Rank	Lane	Name	Nationality	Time	Notes
1st place, gold medalist(s)	4	Louise Hansson	Sweden	55.20	NR
2nd place, silver medalist(s)	6	Kylie Masse	Canada	55.22	NR
3rd place, bronze medalist(s)	2	Katharine Berkoff	United States	55.40	
4	5	Kira Toussaint	Netherlands	55.53	
5	3	Rhyan White	United States	55.87	
6	1	Maaike de Waard	Netherlands	56.11	
7	8	Simona Kubová	Czech Republic	56.68	
8	7	Anastasiya Shkurdai	Belarus	56.99	
