= Swimming at the 2022 World Aquatics Championships – Women's 50 metre backstroke =

Women's 50 metre backstroke at the 2022 World Aquatics Championships
- Venue: Danube Arena
- Location: Budapest, Hungary
- Dates: 21 June (heats and semifinals); 22 June (final)
- Competitors: 39 from 36 nations
- Winning time: 27.31

Medalists
gold medal	Kylie Masse	Canada
silver medal	Katharine Berkoff	United States
bronze medal	Analia Pigrée	France

The Women's 50 metre backstroke competition at the 2022 World Aquatics Championships was held on 21 and 22 June 2022.

== Records ==
Prior to the competition, the existing world and championship records were as follows.

World record	Liu Xiang (CHN)	26.98	Jakarta, Indonesia	21 August 2018
Competition record	Zhao Jing (CHN)	27.06	Rome, Italy	30 July 2009

== Results ==
=== Heats ===
The heats were started on 21 June at 09:00.

Rank	Heat	Lane	Name	Nationality	Time	Notes
1	4	5	Kylie Masse	Canada	27.26	Q
2	3	4	Katharine Berkoff	United States	27.49	Q
3	4	3	Ingrid Wilm	Canada	27.55	Q
4	3	5	Regan Smith	United States	27.70	Q
5	2	5	Analia Pigrée	France	27.75	Q
6	2	6	Medi Harris	Great Britain	27.83	Q
7	3	3	Silvia Scalia	Italy	27.86	Q
8	2	4	Kaylee McKeown	Australia	27.94	Q
9	4	8	Chen Jie	China	27.95	Q
10	2	3	Maaike de Waard	Netherlands	28.04	Q
11	4	6	Mimosa Jallow	Finland	28.06	Q
12	4	2	Theodora Drakou	Greece	28.12	Q
13	4	4	Kira Toussaint	Netherlands	28.17	Q
14	3	7	Simona Kubová	Czech Republic	28.37	Q
15	4	1	Lee Eun-ji	South Korea	28.38	Q
16	2	2	Paulina Peda	Poland	28.47	Q
17	2	7	Lora Komoróczy	Hungary	28.49	
18	3	2	Julie Kepp Jensen	Denmark	28.50	
19	3	6	Caroline Pilhatsch	Austria	28.54	
20	3	1	Andrea Berrino	Argentina	28.56	
21	4	7	Louise Hansson	Sweden	28.67	
22	3	8	Stephanie Au	Hong Kong	28.70	
23	2	1	Olivia Nel	South Africa	29.06	
24	4	0	Alexia Sotomayor	Peru	29.72	
25	3	0	Donata Katai	Zimbabwe	29.81	
26	4	9	Hsu An	Chinese Taipei	30.46	
27	2	8	Masniari Wolf	Indonesia	30.48	
28	3	9	Marie Khoury	Lebanon	30.57	
29	2	0	Mia Blaževska Eminova	North Macedonia	30.61	
30	1	3	Noor Taha	Bahrain	31.38	
31	1	8	Enkh-Amgalangiin Ariuntamir	Mongolia	31.95	
32	1	6	Lucia Ruchti	Suspended Member Federation	32.33	
33	2	9	Jovana Kuljača	Montenegro	32.74	
34	1	4	Denise Donelli	Mozambique	32.76	
35	1	1	Aynura Primova	Turkmenistan	32.91	
36	1	5	Avice Meya	Uganda	32.94	
37	1	2	Ariel Rodrigues	Guyana	33.18	
38	1	7	Hamna Ahmed	Maldives	34.53	
39	1	0	Kayla Temba	Tanzania	39.30	

=== Semifinals ===
The semifinals were started on 21 June at 18:37.

Rank	Heat	Lane	Name	Nationality	Time	Notes
1	2	4	Kylie Masse	Canada	27.22	Q
2	2	3	Analia Pigrée	France	27.29	Q, NR
2	1	5	Regan Smith	United States	27.29	Q
4	2	5	Ingrid Wilm	Canada	27.39	Q
5	1	4	Katharine Berkoff	United States	27.40	Q
6	1	6	Kaylee McKeown	Australia	27.58	Q
7	2	1	Kira Toussaint	Netherlands	27.69	Q
8	1	3	Medi Harris	Great Britain	27.72	QSO
8	2	6	Silvia Scalia	Italy	27.72	QSO
10	1	2	Maaike de Waard	Netherlands	27.77	
11	2	2	Chen Jie	China	27.83	
12	1	7	Theodora Drakou	Greece	27.99	
12	2	7	Mimosa Jallow	Finland	27.99	
14	1	8	Paulina Peda	Poland	28.11	
15	2	8	Lee Eun-ji	South Korea	28.26	
16	1	1	Simona Kubová	Czech Republic	28.35	

==== Swim-off ====
The swim-off was held on 21 June at 20:24.

Rank	Lane	Name	Nationality	Time	Notes
1	4	Medi Harris	Great Britain	27.56	Q
2	5	Silvia Scalia	Italy	27.65	NR

=== Final ===
The final was held on 22 June at 18:30.

Rank	Lane	Name	Nationality	Time	Notes
1st place, gold medalist(s)	4	Kylie Masse	Canada	27.31	
2nd place, silver medalist(s)	2	Katharine Berkoff	United States	27.39	
3rd place, bronze medalist(s)	3	Analia Pigrée	France	27.40	
4	6	Ingrid Wilm	Canada	27.43	
5	5	Regan Smith	United States	27.47	
5	7	Kaylee McKeown	Australia	27.47	
7	8	Medi Harris	Great Britain	27.72	
8	1	Kira Toussaint	Netherlands	27.80	
