= 2022 FINA World Swimming Championships (25 m) – Women's 50 metre backstroke =

Swimming competition

Women's 50 metre backstroke at the 2022 FINA World Swimming Championships (25 m)
- Venue: Melbourne Sports and Aquatic Centre
- Location: Melbourne, Australia
- Dates: 15 December (heats and semifinals); 16 December (final)
- Competitors: 50 from 42 nations
- Winning time: 25.25 WR

Medalists
gold medal	Maggie Mac Neil	Canada
silver medal	Claire Curzan	United States
bronze medal	Mollie O'Callaghan	Australia

The Women's 50 metre backstroke competition of the 2022 FINA World Swimming Championships (25 m) was held on 15 and 16 December 2022.

== Records ==
Prior to the competition, the existing world and championship records were as follows.

World record	Maggie Mac Neil (CAN)	25.27	Abu Dhabi, United Arab Emirates	20 December 2021
Competition record	Maggie Mac Neil (CAN)	25.27	Abu Dhabi, United Arab Emirates	20 December 2021

The following new records were set during this competition:

Date	Event	Name	Nationality	Time	Record
16 December	Final	Maggie Mac Neil	Canada	25.25	WR

== Results ==
=== Heats ===
The heats was started on 15 December at 11:05.

Rank	Heat	Lane	Name	Nationality	Time	Notes
1	7	6	Julie Kepp Jensen	Denmark	25.85	Q, NR
2	6	4	Kylie Masse	Canada	25.94	Q
3	7	7	Mollie O'Callaghan	Australia	25.99	Q
4	4	5	Claire Curzan	United States	26.07	Q
4	6	2	Hanna Rosvall	Sweden	26.07	Q
4	7	5	Louise Hansson	Sweden	26.07	Q
7	5	4	Kira Toussaint	Netherlands	26.09	Q
7	7	4	Maggie Mac Neil	Canada	26.09	Q
9	7	2	Simona Kubová	Czech Republic	26.17	Q, NR
10	6	6	Kaylee McKeown	Australia	26.24	Q
11	5	5	Maaike de Waard	Netherlands	26.32	Q
12	6	3	Wan Letian	China	26.38	Q
13	5	3	Silvia Scalia	Italy	26.40	Q
14	5	6	Mary-Ambre Moluh	France	26.45	Q
15	4	4	Erika Brown	United States	26.50	Q
16	6	5	Analia Pigrée	France	26.54	Q
17	6	8	Medi Harris	Great Britain	26.68	
18	4	2	Kim San-ha	South Korea	26.70	NR
19	6	7	Miki Takahashi	Japan	26.77	
19	7	1	Adela Piskorska	Poland	26.77	
21	7	3	Caroline Pilhatsch	Austria	26.81	
22	5	7	Peng Xuwei	China	26.99	
23	6	1	Andrea Berrino	Argentina	27.15	
24	3	6	Miranda Grana	Mexico	27.17	
25	5	2	Ingeborg Løyning	Norway	27.20	
26	4	6	Margherita Panziera	Italy	27.30	
26	7	8	Stephanie Au	Hong Kong	27.30	
28	5	1	Emma Godwin	New Zealand	27.37	
29	3	7	Abril Aunchayna	Uruguay	28.06	
29	4	3	Alexia Sotomayor	Peru	28.06	NR
31	4	1	Milla Drakopoulos	South Africa	28.08	
31	5	8	Chloe Isleta	Philippines	28.08	
33	4	8	Teresa Ivanová	Slovakia	28.29	
34	3	4	Amani Al-Obaidli	Bahrain	28.76	
35	3	5	Donata Katai	Zimbabwe	28.83	
36	3	3	Carolina Cermelli	Panama	29.00	NR
37	4	7	Marie Khoury	Lebanon	29.35	
38	2	4	Enkh-Amgalangiin Ariuntamir	Mongolia	29.68	NR
39	3	2	Nubia Adjei	Ghana	29.96	NR
40	3	1	Salome Nikolaishvili	Georgia	30.11	
41	2	8	Cheang Weng Lam	Macau	30.24	
42	1	3	Idealy Tendrinavalona	Madagascar	32.19	
43	2	1	Naya Hughes	Botswana	32.20	
44	2	6	Ria Save	Tanzania	32.90	
45	2	2	Aishath Sausan	Maldives	33.10	
46	2	3	Shoko Litulumar	Northern Mariana Islands	33.86	
47	2	5	Noelani Day	Tonga	33.92	
48	2	7	Kayla Hepler	Marshall Islands	33.99	
49	1	5	Rosha Neupane	Nepal	35.28	
50	1	4	Raya Young	Eswatini	35.86	
	3	8	Ganga Senavirathne	Sri Lanka	Did not start	

=== Semifinals ===
The semifinals was started on 15 December at 19:48.

Rank	Heat	Lane	Name	Nationality	Time	Notes
1	1	5	Claire Curzan	United States	25.60	Q, NR
2	1	6	Maggie Mac Neil	Canada	25.64	Q
3	2	5	Mollie O'Callaghan	Australia	25.69	Q, OC
4	1	4	Kylie Masse	Canada	25.97	Q
5	1	3	Louise Hansson	Sweden	25.99	Q
6	2	3	Hanna Rosvall	Sweden	26.01	Q
7	2	4	Julie Kepp Jensen	Denmark	26.02	Q
7	2	7	Maaike de Waard	Netherlands	26.02	Q
9	1	2	Kaylee McKeown	Australia	26.09	
10	2	6	Kira Toussaint	Netherlands	26.17	
11	1	1	Analia Pigrée	France	26.26	
12	2	2	Simona Kubová	Czech Republic	26.32	
13	2	1	Silvia Scalia	Italy	26.39	
14	1	7	Wan Letian	China	26.48	
15	1	1	Mary-Ambre Moluh	France	26.54	
16	2	8	Erika Brown	United States	26.56	

=== Final ===
The final was held on 16 December at 20:06.

Rank	Lane	Name	Nationality	Time	Notes
1st place, gold medalist(s)	5	Maggie Mac Neil	Canada	25.25	WR
2nd place, silver medalist(s)	4	Claire Curzan	United States	25.54	NR
3rd place, bronze medalist(s)	3	Mollie O'Callaghan	Australia	25.61	OC
4	6	Kylie Masse	Canada	25.81	
5	2	Louise Hansson	Sweden	26.00	
6	7	Hanna Rosvall	Sweden	26.05	
7	1	Julie Kepp Jensen	Denmark	26.14	
8	8	Maaike de Waard	Netherlands	26.16	
