= Swimming at the 2022 World Aquatics Championships – Women's 100 metre backstroke =

Women's 100 metre backstroke at the 2022 World Aquatics Championships
- Venue: Danube Arena
- Location: Budapest, Hungary
- Dates: 19 June (heats and semifinals); 20 June (final)
- Competitors: 43 from 37 nations
- Winning time: 58.22

Medalists
gold medal	Regan Smith	United States
silver medal	Kylie Masse	Canada
bronze medal	Claire Curzan	United States

The Women's 100 metre backstroke competition at the 2022 World Aquatics Championships was held on 19 and 20 June 2022.

== Records ==
Prior to the competition, the existing world and championship records were as follows.

World record	Kaylee McKeown (AUS)	57.45	Adelaide, Australia	13 June 2021
Competition record	Regan Smith (USA)	57.57	Gwangju, South Korea	28 July 2019

== Results ==
=== Heats ===
The heats were started on 19 June at 09:00.

Rank	Heat	Lane	Name	Nationality	Time	Notes
1	3	4	Regan Smith	United States	58.31	Q
2	4	4	Kylie Masse	Canada	58.89	Q
3	5	5	Claire Curzan	United States	59.09	Q
4	5	6	Wan Letian	China	59.67	Q
5	4	5	Kira Toussaint	Netherlands	59.69	Q
6	4	6	Emma Terebo	France	59.87	Q
7	5	3	Peng Xuwei	China	59.93	Q
8	4	2	Medi Harris	Great Britain	1:00.03	Q
9	3	5	Margherita Panziera	Italy	1:00.40	Q
10	3	3	Maaike de Waard	Netherlands	1:00.46	Q
11	5	1	Silvia Scalia	Italy	1:00.77	Q
12	5	7	Lee Eun-ji	South Korea	1:00.78	Q
13	3	6	Paulina Peda	Poland	1:00.83	Q
14	4	0	Hanna Rosvall	Sweden	1:00.99	Q
15	3	7	Mimosa Jallow	Finland	1:01.01	Q
16	5	2	Analia Pigrée	France	1:01.13	Q
17	4	3	Taylor Ruck	Canada	1:01.14	
18	4	7	Simona Kubová	Czech Republic	1:01.19	
19	3	2	Katalin Burián	Hungary	1:01.26	
20	5	8	Theodora Drakou	Greece	1:01.59	
21	3	1	Stephanie Au	Hong Kong	1:01.62	
22	4	8	Aviv Barzelay	Israel	1:01.65	
23	3	8	Andrea Berrino	Argentina	1:02.13	
24	4	1	Gabriela Georgieva	Bulgaria	1:02.86	
25	5	9	Olivia Nel	South Africa	1:02.95	
26	2	4	Jimena Leguizamón	Colombia	1:03.16	
27	2	5	Danielle Titus	Barbados	1:03.79	
28	3	0	Xenia Ignatova	Kazakhstan	1:03.92	
29	5	0	Aleksa Gold	Estonia	1:03.95	
30	2	1	Mia Blaževska Eminova	North Macedonia	1:04.11	NR
31	2	3	Elizabeth Jiménez	Dominican Republic	1:04.15	
32	2	8	Andrea Becali	Cuba	1:04.72	
33	3	9	Donata Katai	Zimbabwe	1:04.80	
34	2	2	Carolina Cermelli	Panama	1:05.16	
35	2	6	Ridima Veerendrakumar	India	1:05.41	
36	4	9	Hsu An	Chinese Taipei	1:05.50	
37	2	7	Masniari Wolf	Indonesia	1:06.70	
38	1	6	Noor Taha	Bahrain	1:09.28	
39	1	4	Enkh-Amgalangiin Ariuntamir	Mongolia	1:10.31	
40	2	0	Jamie Joachim	Saint Vincent and the Grenadines	1:12.76	
41	1	3	Aynura Primova	Turkmenistan	1:13.05	
42	2	9	Jennifer Harding-Marlin	Saint Kitts and Nevis	1:16.28	
43	1	5	Aishath Sausan	Maldives	1:18.76	
	5	4	Kaylee McKeown	Australia	Did not start	

=== Semifinals ===
The semifinals were started on 19 June at 18:56.

Rank	Heat	Lane	Name	Nationality	Time	Notes
1	2	4	Regan Smith	United States	57.65	Q
2	1	4	Kylie Masse	Canada	58.57	Q
3	2	5	Claire Curzan	United States	58.96	Q
4	2	3	Kira Toussaint	Netherlands	59.16	Q
5	1	6	Medi Harris	Great Britain	59.61	Q
6	1	5	Wan Letian	China	59.63	Q
7	2	6	Peng Xuwei	China	59.96	Q
8	1	3	Emma Terebo	France	1:00.06	Q
9	1	2	Maaike de Waard	Netherlands	1:00.15	
10	2	2	Margherita Panziera	Italy	1:00.26	
11	1	7	Lee Eun-ji	South Korea	1:00.58	
11	2	7	Silvia Scalia	Italy	1:00.58	
13	2	8	Mimosa Jallow	Finland	1:00.68	
14	1	1	Hanna Rosvall	Sweden	1:00.76	
15	2	1	Paulina Peda	Poland	1:00.88	
16	1	8	Analia Pigrée	France	1:01.59	

=== Final ===
The final was held on 20 June at 18:51.

Rank	Lane	Name	Nationality	Time	Notes
1st place, gold medalist(s)	4	Regan Smith	United States	58.22	
2nd place, silver medalist(s)	5	Kylie Masse	Canada	58.40	
3rd place, bronze medalist(s)	3	Claire Curzan	United States	58.67	
4	7	Wan Letian	China	59.77	
5	8	Emma Terebo	France	59.98	
6	6	Kira Toussaint	Netherlands	59.99	
7	1	Peng Xuwei	China	1:00.01	
7	2	Medi Harris	Great Britain	1:00.01	
