= 2021 FINA World Swimming Championships (25 m) – Women's 50 metre backstroke =

Swimming competition

Women's 50 metre backstroke at the 2021 FINA World Swimming Championships (25 m)
- Venue: Etihad Arena
- Location: Abu Dhabi, United Arab Emirates
- Dates: 19 December (heats and semifinals); 20 December (final)
- Competitors: 55 from 51 nations
- Winning time: 25.27 WR

Medalists
| gold medal | Maggie Mac Neil | Canada |
| silver medal | Kylie Masse | Canada |
| bronze medal | Louise Hansson | Sweden |

The Women's 50 metre backstroke competition of the 2021 FINA World Swimming Championships (25 m) was held on 19 and 20 December 2021.

== Records ==
Prior to the competition, the existing world and championship records were as follows.

| World record | Kira Toussaint (NED) | 25.60 | Budapest, Hungary Amsterdam, Netherlands | 14 November 2020 18 December 2020 |
| Competition record | Etiene Medeiros (BRA) | 25.67 | Doha, Qatar | 7 December 2014 |

The following new records were set during this competition:

| Date | Event | Name | Nation | Time | Record |
|---|---|---|---|---|---|
| 20 December | Final | Maggie Mac Neil | Canada | 25.27 | WR |

== Results ==
=== Heats ===
The heats were started on 19 December at 09:36.

| Rank | Heat | Lane | Name | Nationality | Time | Notes |
|---|---|---|---|---|---|---|
| 1 | 6 | 4 | Maggie Mac Neil | Canada | 25.98 | Q |
| 2 | 6 | 5 | Louise Hansson | Sweden | 26.27 | Q |
| 3 | 5 | 4 | Kylie Masse | Canada | 26.30 | Q |
| 3 | 7 | 4 | Kira Toussaint | Netherlands | 26.30 | Q |
| 5 | 7 | 3 | Maaike de Waard | Netherlands | 26.39 | Q |
| 5 | 7 | 5 | Analia Pigrée | France | 26.39 | Q |
| 7 | 5 | 3 | Simona Kubová | Czech Republic | 26.44 | Q |
| 8 | 6 | 3 | Silvia Scalia | Italy | 26.50 | Q |
| 9 | 7 | 2 | Hanna Rosvall | Sweden | 26.52 | Q |
| 10 | 5 | 6 | Caroline Pilhatsch | Austria | 26.77 | Q |
| 11 | 7 | 6 | Holly Barratt | Australia | 26.84 | Q |
| 12 | 6 | 1 | Mary-Ambre Moluh | France | 27.15 | Q |
| 13 | 5 | 2 | Danielle Hill | Ireland | 27.17 | Q |
| 13 | 7 | 9 | Peng Xuwei | China | 27.17 | Q |
| 15 | 5 | 5 | Julie Kepp Jensen | Denmark | 27.25 | Q |
| 16 | 6 | 2 | Daryna Zevina | Ukraine | 27.26 | Q |
| 17 | 7 | 7 | Ekaterina Avramova | Turkey | 27.35 | |
| 18 | 5 | 1 | Stephanie Au | Hong Kong | 27.45 | |
| 18 | 5 | 7 | Nina Stanisavljević | Serbia | 27.45 | =NR |
| 20 | 6 | 7 | Anastasiya Kuliashova | Belarus | 27.50 | |
| 21 | 5 | 9 | Chloe Isleta | Philippines | 27.62 | NR |
| 22 | 5 | 8 | Nina Kost | Switzerland | 27.87 | |
| 23 | 7 | 8 | Laura Riedemann | Germany | 28.00 | |
| 24 | 7 | 1 | Daria Ustinova | Russian Swimming Federation | 28.44 | |
| 25 | 6 | 0 | Marie Khoury | Lebanon | 29.13 | NR |
| 26 | 4 | 7 | Sarah Szklaruk | Chile | 29.16 | NR |
| 27 | 6 | 9 | Ridhima Veerendrakumar | India | 29.45 | |
| 28 | 1 | 5 | Lauren Hew | Cayman Islands | 29.58 | |
| 29 | 4 | 3 | Colleen Furgeson | Marshall Islands | 29.76 | NR |
| 30 | 4 | 4 | Nubia Adjei | Ghana | 30.09 | |
| 31 | 4 | 1 | Kimberly Ince | Grenada | 30.30 | |
| 32 | 4 | 6 | Aaliyah Palestrini | Seychelles | 30.34 | |
| 33 | 4 | 0 | Bisma Khan | Pakistan | 30.37 | |
| 34 | 4 | 8 | Salome Nikolaishvili | Georgia | 30.60 | |
| 35 | 4 | 5 | Noor Yussuf Abdulla | Bahrain | 30.64 | |
| 36 | 3 | 4 | Ganga Senavirathne | Sri Lanka | 30.92 | |
| 37 | 2 | 6 | Arianis Martínez | Panama | 31.08 | |
| 38 | 4 | 9 | Jovana Kuljača | Montenegro | 31.34 | |
| 39 | 3 | 2 | Avice Meya | Uganda | 31.35 | |
| 40 | 3 | 5 | Denise Donelli | Mozambique | 31.37 | |
| 41 | 3 | 6 | Naima Hazell | Saint Lucia | 32.00 | |
| 42 | 1 | 3 | Erina Idrizaj | Kosovo | 32.04 | |
| 43 | 2 | 1 | Kevern da Silva | Saint Vincent and the Grenadines | 32.17 | |
| 44 | 3 | 3 | Lindsay Barr | United States Virgin Islands | 32.33 | |
| 45 | 2 | 8 | Arleigha Hall | Turks and Caicos Islands | 32.70 | |
| 46 | 3 | 9 | Hamna Ahmed | Maldives | 32.78 | NR |
| 47 | 3 | 1 | Patrice Mahaica | Guyana | 32.91 | |
| 48 | 3 | 7 | Jennifer Harding-Marlin | Saint Kitts and Nevis | 33.57 | |
| 49 | 3 | 0 | Noelani Day | Tonga | 33.75 | |
| 50 | 2 | 2 | Shoko Litulumar | Northern Mariana Islands | 33.85 | |
| 51 | 2 | 7 | Jourdyn Adams | Federated States of Micronesia | 33.95 | |
| 52 | 2 | 3 | Daniella Nafal | Palestine | 34.11 | |
| 53 | 2 | 4 | Leena Mohamedahmed | Sudan | 41.78 | |
| 54 | 2 | 5 | Kanu Isha | Sierra Leone | 44.23 | |
| 55 | 1 | 4 | Sabrina Ikromova | Tajikistan | 44.36 | |
| | 3 | 8 | Ria Save | Tanzania | DNS | |
| | 4 | 2 | Timipame-ere Akiayefa | Nigeria | DNS | |
| | 5 | 0 | Lucy Hope | Great Britain | DNS | |
| | 6 | 6 | Elena Di Liddo | Italy | DNS | |
| | 6 | 8 | Rhyan White | United States | DNS | |
| | 7 | 0 | Fanny Teijonsalo | Finland | DNS | |

=== Semifinals ===
The semifinals were started on 19 December at 19:19.

| Rank | Heat | Lane | Name | Nationality | Time | Notes |
|---|---|---|---|---|---|---|
| 1 | 1 | 4 | Louise Hansson | Sweden | 25.83 | Q, NR |
| 2 | 2 | 5 | Kylie Masse | Canada | 25.84 | Q, =NR |
| 3 | 2 | 4 | Maggie Mac Neil | Canada | 25.92 | Q |
| 4 | 2 | 3 | Maaike de Waard | Netherlands | 25.97 | Q |
| 5 | 1 | 3 | Analia Pigrée | France | 26.07 | Q |
| 6 | 2 | 8 | Julie Kepp Jensen | Denmark | 26.25 | Q |
| 7 | 1 | 2 | Caroline Pilhatsch | Austria | 26.29 | Q |
| 8 | 2 | 7 | Holly Barratt | Australia | 26.38 | Q |
| 9 | 2 | 2 | Hanna Rosvall | Sweden | 26.39 | |
| 10 | 1 | 5 | Kira Toussaint | Netherlands | 26.43 | |
| 11 | 1 | 6 | Silvia Scalia | Italy | 26.46 | |
| 12 | 2 | 6 | Simona Kubová | Czech Republic | 26.53 | |
| 13 | 1 | 1 | Peng Xuwei | China | 26.86 | |
| 14 | 2 | 1 | Danielle Hill | Ireland | 26.88 | |
| 15 | 1 | 7 | Mary-Ambre Moluh | France | 27.00 | |
| 16 | 1 | 8 | Daryna Zevina | Ukraine | 27.20 | |

=== Final ===
The final was held on 20 December at 19:12.

| Rank | Lane | Name | Nationality | Time | Notes |
|---|---|---|---|---|---|
| 1st place, gold medalist(s) | 3 | Maggie Mac Neil | Canada | 25.27 | WR |
| 2nd place, silver medalist(s) | 5 | Kylie Masse | Canada | 25.62 | |
| 3rd place, bronze medalist(s) | 4 | Louise Hansson | Sweden | 25.86 | |
| 4 | 2 | Analia Pigrée | France | 25.96 | NR |
| 5 | 6 | Maaike de Waard | Netherlands | 25.99 | |
| 6 | 1 | Caroline Pilhatsch | Austria | 26.05 | |
| 7 | 8 | Holly Barratt | Australia | 26.18 | |
| 8 | 7 | Julie Kepp Jensen | Denmark | 26.50 | |
