= Swimming at the 2022 European Aquatics Championships – Women's 100 metre backstroke =

Women's 100 metre backstroke at the 2022 European Aquatics Championships
- Venue: Foro Italico
- Dates: 15 August (heats and semifinals); 16 August (final)
- Competitors: 33 from 20 nations
- Winning time: 59.40

Medalists
gold medal	Margherita Panziera	Italy
silver medal	Medi Harris	Great Britain
bronze medal	Kira Toussaint	Netherlands

The Women's 100 metre backstroke competition of the 2022 European Aquatics Championships was held on 15 and 16 August 2022.

== Records ==
Prior the competition, the existing world, European and championship records were as follows.

	Name	Nationality	Time	Location	Date
World record	Kaylee McKeown	Australia	57.45	Adelaide	15 June 2021
European record Championship record	Kathleen Dawson	Great Britain	58.08	Budapest	23 May 2021

== Results ==
=== Heats ===
The heats were started on 15 August at 09:24.

Rank	Heat	Lane	Name	Nationality	Time	Notes
1	4	4	Kira Toussaint	Netherlands	59.59	Q
2	2	4	Medi Harris	Great Britain	1:00.15	Q
3	3	2	Silvia Scalia	Italy	1:00.28	Q
4	3	4	Margherita Panziera	Italy	1:00.33	Q
5	3	5	Emma Terebo	France	1:00.52	Q
6	4	2	Pauline Mahieu	France	1:00.53	Q
7	4	7	Simona Kubová	Czech Republic	1:00.66	Q
8	2	1	Camila Rebelo	Portugal	1:00.94	Q, NR
9	4	5	Maaike de Waard	Netherlands	1:01.14	Q
10	2	3	Analia Pigrée	France	1:01.24	
11	3	6	Federica Toma	Italy	1:01.32	
12	2	5	Mary-Ambre Moluh	France	1:01.33	
13	3	1	Roos Vanotterdijk	Belgium	1:01.39	Q
14	3	7	Hanna Rosvall	Sweden	1:01.47	Q
15	4	3	Paulina Peda	Poland	1:01.60	Q
16	2	7	Dóra Molnár	Hungary	1:01.62	Q
17	3	8	Rafaela Azevedo	Portugal	1:01.78	Q
18	4	6	Ingeborg Løyning	Norway	1:01.84	Q
19	1	6	Laura Bernat	Poland	1:02.03	Q
20	4	0	Carmen Weiler	Spain	1:02.08	
21	2	6	Danielle Hill	Ireland	1:02.15	
22	4	8	África Zamorano	Spain	1:02.17	
23	2	8	Lotte Hosper	Netherlands	1:02.28	
24	4	1	Lauren Cox	Great Britain	1:02.31	
25	4	9	Johanna Roas	Germany	1:02.48	
26	2	0	Eszter Szabó-Feltóthy	Hungary	1:02.63	
27	1	4	Daryna Zevina	Ukraine	1:02.70	
28	2	2	Nina Kost	Switzerland	1:02.71	
29	1	7	Gabriela Georgieva	Bulgaria	1:02.87	
30	1	2	Nika Sharafutdinova	Ukraine	1:02.95	
31	3	9	Lena Grabowski	Austria	1:03.32	
32	1	3	Karoline Sørensen	Denmark	1:03.40	
33	2	9	Aleksa Gold	Estonia	1:04.15	
	1	5	Alicia Wilson	Great Britain	Did not start	
	3	0	Theodora Drakou	Greece	Did not start	
	3	3	Louise Hansson	Sweden	Did not start	

=== Semifinals ===
The semifinals were started at 18:20.

Rank	Heat	Lane	Name	Nationality	Time	Notes
1	1	5	Margherita Panziera	Italy	59.72	Q
2	1	3	Pauline Mahieu	France	59.75	Q
3	2	2	Maaike de Waard	Netherlands	59.89	Q
4	1	4	Medi Harris	Great Britain	1:00.03	q
5	2	5	Silvia Scalia	Italy	1:00.04	Q
6	2	4	Kira Toussaint	Netherlands	1:00.10	q
7	2	3	Emma Terebo	France	1:00.35	q
8	2	6	Simona Kubová	Czech Republic	1:00.38	q
9	1	6	Camila Rebelo	Portugal	1:00.66	NR
10	2	7	Hanna Rosvall	Sweden	1:00.83	
11	1	7	Paulina Peda	Poland	1:00.87	
12	2	1	Dóra Molnár	Hungary	1:01.13	
13	1	1	Rafaela Azevedo	Portugal	1:01.56	
14	1	2	Roos Vanotterdijk	Belgium	1:01.61	
15	1	8	Laura Bernat	Poland	1:01.73	
16	2	8	Ingeborg Løyning	Norway	1:02.23	

=== Final ===
The final was held at 19:46.

Rank	Lane	Name	Nationality	Time	Notes
1st place, gold medalist(s)	4	Margherita Panziera	Italy	59.40	
2nd place, silver medalist(s)	6	Medi Harris	Great Britain	59.46	
3rd place, bronze medalist(s)	7	Kira Toussaint	Netherlands	59.53	
4	5	Pauline Mahieu	France	1:00.00	
5	2	Silvia Scalia	Italy	1:00.12	
6	1	Emma Terebo	France	1:00.40	
7	8	Simona Kubová	Czech Republic	1:00.50	
8	3	Maaike de Waard	Netherlands	1:00.54	
