= Swimming at the 2022 European Aquatics Championships – Women's 50 metre backstroke =

Women's 50 metre backstroke at the 2022 European Aquatics Championships
- Venue: Foro Italico
- Dates: 13 August (heats and semifinals); 14 August (final)
- Competitors: 36 from 24 nations
- Winning time: 27.27

Medalists
gold medal	Analia Pigrée	France
silver medal	Silvia Scalia	Italy
bronze medal	Maaike de Waard	Netherlands

The Women's 50 metre backstroke competition of the 2022 European Aquatics Championships was held on 13 and 14 August 2022.

== Records ==
Prior to the competition, the existing world, European and championship records were as follows.

	Name	Nationality	Time	Location	Date
World record	Liu Xiang	China	26.98	Jakarta	21 August 2018
European record	Kira Toussaint	Netherlands	27.10	Eindhoven	10 April 2021
Championship record	Kathleen Dawson	Great Britain	27.19	Budapest	18 May 2021

== Results ==
=== Heats ===
The heats were started on 13 August at 09:32.

Rank	Heat	Lane	Name	Nationality	Time	Notes
1	3	4	Analia Pigrée	France	27.53	Q
2	3	5	Silvia Scalia	Italy	27.71	Q
3	2	5	Maaike de Waard	Netherlands	27.87	Q
4	2	4	Medi Harris	Great Britain	27.92	Q
5	4	5	Mary-Ambre Moluh	France	27.96	Q
6	4	4	Kira Toussaint	Netherlands	28.10	Q
7	4	8	Simona Kubová	Czech Republic	28.17	Q
8	4	1	Béryl Gastaldello	France	28.18	
8	3	6	Anastasya Gorbenko	Israel	28.18	Q
10	2	8	Johanna Roas	Germany	28.29	Q
11	2	7	Pauline Mahieu	France	28.39	
12	2	6	Costanza Cocconcelli	Italy	28.42	Q
13	4	3	Caroline Pilhatsch	Austria	28.43	Q
14	3	2	Julie Kepp Jensen	Denmark	28.50	Q
15	4	2	Theodora Drakou	Greece	28.54	Q
15	3	7	Danielle Hill	Ireland	28.54	Q
17	2	3	Federica Toma	Italy	28.56	
18	3	3	Lauren Cox	Great Britain	28.70	Q
19	3	0	Hanna Rosvall	Sweden	28.73	Q
20	3	1	Rafaela Azevedo	Portugal	28.78	
21	2	0	Nina Stanisavljević	Serbia	28.82	
22	3	8	Carmen Weiler	Spain	28.83	
23	4	9	Camila Rebelo	Portugal	28.89	
24	2	9	Daryna Zevina	Ukraine	29.03	
25	1	7	Jenna Laukkanen	Finland	29.13	
25	2	2	Ingeborg Løyning	Norway	29.13	
27	2	1	Nina Kost	Switzerland	29.23	
28	4	0	Roos Vanotterdijk	Belgium	29.27	
29	1	6	Tamara Potocká	Slovakia	29.67	
30	1	2	Gabriela Georgieva	Bulgaria	29.69	
31	3	9	Nika Sharafutdinova	Ukraine	29.70	
32	1	5	Lena Grabowski	Austria	29.77	
33	1	3	Eszter Szabó-Feltóthy	Hungary	29.96	
34	1	4	Laura Bernat	Poland	30.04	
35	1	1	Laura Lahtinen	Finland	31.36	
	4	6	Tessa Giele	Netherlands	Disqualified	
	4	7	Paulina Peda	Poland	Did not start	

=== Semifinals ===
The semifinals were started on 13 August at 18:57.

Rank	Heat	Lane	Name	Nationality	Time	Notes
1	1	4	Silvia Scalia	Italy	27.39	Q, NR
2	1	5	Medi Harris	Great Britain	27.68	Q
2	2	4	Analia Pigrée	France	27.68	Q
4	1	3	Kira Toussaint	Netherlands	27.84	q
5	2	3	Mary-Ambre Moluh	France	27.86	Q
6	2	5	Maaike de Waard	Netherlands	28.00	q
7	1	7	Julie Kepp Jensen	Denmark	28.16	q
8	1	1	Theodora Drakou	Greece	28.18	q
9	2	8	Lauren Cox	Great Britain	28.19	
9	1	6	Anastasya Gorbenko	Israel	28.19	
11	2	6	Simona Kubová	Czech Republic	28.21	
12	1	2	Costanza Cocconcelli	Italy	28.22	
13	1	8	Hanna Rosvall	Sweden	28.49	
14	2	1	Danielle Hill	Ireland	28.54	
15	2	2	Johanna Roas	Germany	28.55	
16	2	7	Caroline Pilhatsch	Austria	28.56	

=== Final ===
The final was held on 14 August at 18:06.

Rank	Lane	Name	Nationality	Time	Notes
1st place, gold medalist(s)	5	Analia Pigrée	France	27.27	NR
2nd place, silver medalist(s)	4	Silvia Scalia	Italy	27.53	
3rd place, bronze medalist(s)	7	Maaike de Waard	Netherlands	27.54	
4	6	Kira Toussaint	Netherlands	27.73	
5	3	Medi Harris	Great Britain	27.90	
6	2	Mary-Ambre Moluh	France	27.95	
7	8	Theodora Drakou	Greece	28.11	
8	1	Julie Kepp Jensen	Denmark	28.54	
