= 2021 FINA World Swimming Championships (25 m) – Women's 4 × 50 metre medley relay =

Swimming competition

Women's 4 × 50 metre medley relay at the 2021 FINA World Swimming Championships (25 m)
- Venue: Etihad Arena
- Location: Abu Dhabi, United Arab Emirates
- Dates: 17 December (heats and final)
- Competitors: 62 from 13 nations
- Teams: 13
- Winning time: 1:42.38 =WR

Medalists
gold medal	Louise Hansson; Sophie Hansson; Sarah Sjöström; Michelle Coleman; Hanna Rosvall; Emelie Fast	Sweden
silver medal	Rhyan White; Lydia Jacoby; Claire Curzan; Abbey Weitzeil; Katharine Berkoff; Emily Escobedo; Kate Douglass	United States
bronze medal	Kira Toussaint; Kim Busch; Maaike de Waard; Ranomi Kromowidjojo; Tessa Giele	Netherlands

The Women's 4 × 50 metre medley relay competition of the 2021 FINA World Swimming Championships (25 m) was held on 17 December 2021.

== Records ==
Prior to the competition, the existing world and championship records were as follows.

World record	United States (USA)	1:42.38	Hangzhou, China	12 December 2018
Competition record	United States (USA)	1:42.38	Hangzhou, China	12 December 2018

The following new records were set during this competition:

Date	Event	Name	Nation	Time	Record
17 December	Final	Louise Hansson (25.91); Sophie Hansson (29.07); Sarah Sjöström (23.96); Michelle Coleman (23.44)	Sweden	1:42.38	=WR

== Results ==
=== Heats ===
The heats were started at 09:30.

Rank	Heat	Lane	Nation	Swimmers	Time	Notes
1	1	1	United States	Katharine Berkoff (25.88); Emily Escobedo (30.32); Claire Curzan (24.87); Kate Douglass (23.43)	1:44.50	Q
2	2	7	Canada	Kylie Masse (26.12); Sydney Pickrem (29.87); Katerine Savard (25.54); Maggie Mac Neil (23.64)	1:45.17	Q, NR
3	2	5	Italy	Silvia Scalia (26.92); Arianna Castiglioni (29.51); Elena Di Liddo (25.17); Silvia Di Pietro (23.88)	1:45.48	Q
4	1	2	China	Peng Xuwei (27.21); Tang Qianting (29.10); Yu Yiting (25.65); Cheng Yujie (23.61)	1:45.57	Q
5	1	4	Sweden	Hanna Rosvall (26.82); Emelie Fast (29.71); Louise Hansson (25.28); Michelle Coleman (23.82)	1:45.63	Q
6	2	4	Russian Swimming Federation	Maria Kameneva (26.55); Evgeniia Chikunova (30.28); Arina Surkova (24.83); Rozaliya Nasretdinova (24.10)	1:45.76	Q
7	1	5	Netherlands	Tessa Giele (26.69); Kim Busch (30.64); Ranomi Kromowidjojo (24.67); Maaike de Waard (24.06)	1:46.06	Q
8	2	1	Belarus	Anastasiya Shkurdai (26.55); Alina Zmushka (30.04); Anastasiya Kuliashova (25.62); Nastassia Karakouskaya (24.47)	1:46.68	Q
9	2	3	France	Marie-Ambre Moluh (27.44); Justine Delmas (30.95); Béryl Gastaldello (25.38); Analia Pigrée (24.72)	1:48.49	
10	1	6	Switzerland	Nina Kost (27.89); Lisa Mamié (30.74); Alexandra Touretski (26.19); Maria Ugolkova (24.29)	1:49.11	NR
11	1	7	Hong Kong	Stephanie Au (27.47); Lam Hoi Kiu (31.34); Chan Kin Lok (26.56); Sze Hang-yu (24.75)	1:50.12	
12	2	6	Slovakia	Tamara Potocká (28.15); Andrea Podmaníková (30.33); Zora Ripková (26.53); Lillian Slušná (25.32)	1:50.33	
13	2	2	Thailand	Jinjutha Pholjamjumrus (29.19); Phiangkhwan Pawapotako (32.45); Jenjira Srisaard (26.01); Kornkarnjana Sapianchai (26.31)	1:53.96	
	1	3	Turkey		DNS	

=== Final ===
The final was held at 18:00.

Rank	Lane	Nation	Swimmers	Time	Notes
1st place, gold medalist(s)	2	Sweden	Louise Hansson (25.91 NR); Sophie Hansson (29.07); Sarah Sjöström (23.96); Michelle Coleman (23.44)	1:42.38	=WR
2nd place, silver medalist(s)	4	United States	Rhyan White (26.33); Lydia Jacoby (29.62); Claire Curzan (24.56); Abbey Weitzeil (23.10)	1:43.61	
3rd place, bronze medalist(s)	1	Netherlands	Kira Toussaint (26.08); Kim Busch (30.59); Maaike de Waard (24.51); Ranomi Kromowidjojo (22.85)	1:44.03	
4	5	Canada	Kylie Masse (25.92); Sydney Pickrem (29.89); Maggie Mac Neil (24.85); Kayla Sanchez (23.50)	1:44.16	NR
5	6	China	Wan Letian (26.41); Tang Qianting (28.96); Yu Yiting (25.28); Cheng Yujie (23.78)	1:44.43	
6	7	Russian Swimming Federation	Maria Kameneva (26.32); Nika Godun (29.56); Arina Surkova (24.63); Rozaliya Nasretdinova (24.00)	1:44.51	
7	3	Italy	Elena Di Liddo (26.81); Arianna Castiglioni (29.34); Silvia Di Pietro (24.93); Costanza Cocconcelli (24.12)	1:45.20	
8	8	Belarus	Anastasiya Shkurdai (26.54); Alina Zmushka (29.72); Anastasiya Kuliashova (25.86); Nastassia Karakouskaya (24.27)	1:46.39	
