= Analia Pigrée =

French Guianese swimmer

Personal information
- National team: France
- Born: 31 July 2001 (age 24) Cayenne, French Guiana
- Height: 1.74 m (5 ft 9 in)

Sport
- Sport: Swimming
- Strokes: Backstroke, freestyle
- Club: Canet 66 Natation
Medal record
Women's swimming
Representing France
Event	1st	2nd	3rd
World Championships (LC)	0	0	1
European Championships (LC)	1	0	0
European Championships (SC)	0	1	1
Total	1	1	2
World Championships (LC)
Bronze medal – third place	2022 Budapest	50 m backstroke
European Championships (LC)
Gold medal – first place	2022 Rome	50 m backstroke
European Championships (SC)
Silver medal – second place	2021 Kazan	50 m backstroke
Silver medal – second place	2025 Lublin	50 m backstroke
Bronze medal – third place	2021 Kazan	100 m backstroke

Analia Pigrée (born 31 July 2001) is a French Guianese swimmer who competes internationally representing France. She is the French record holder in the long course and short course 50 metre backstroke and the short course 100 metre backstroke. In the 50 metre backstroke, she won the gold medal at the 2022 European Aquatics Championships (long course), a silver medal at the 2021 European Short Course Championships, and the bronze medal at the 2022 World Aquatics Championships (long course). In the 100 metre backstroke, she won the bronze medal at the 2021 European Short Course Championships.

== Background ==
Pigrée was born 31 July 2001 in Cayenne, French Guiana. One of the swimmers Pigrée was inspired by growing up was Malia Metella.

== Career ==
=== 2021 ===
At the French Championships held in Chartres, France in June 2021, Pigrée broke the French record in the 50 metre backstroke, set in 2018 by Béryl Gastaldello, with a time of 27.81 seconds in the prelims heats on 18 June. In the final of the 50 metre backstroke later the same day, she lowered her own French record by over two-tenths of a second to 27.59 seconds. About six weeks later, at the 2021 Spanish Summer Open Championships in Las Palmas, Spain, Pigrée set a new French record in the 50 metre backstroke on 3 August with a time of 27.39 seconds.

==== 2021 European Short Course Championships ====
2021 European Championships (SC)
Silver medal – second place	50 m backstroke	26.08
Bronze medal – third place	100 m backstroke	56.40 (NR)

In the semifinals of the 50 metre backstroke at the 2021 European Short Course Championships, held at the Palace of Water Sports in Kazan, Russia, Pigrée swam a personal best time of 26.05 seconds, which advanced her to the final of the event ranked first. In the final of the event on 5 November, Pigrée won the silver medal in a time of 26.08 seconds, finishing behind Kira Toussaint of the Netherlands. About the outcome, Pigrée said to Swimming World, "First international competition, first final and first medal. This is just insane! This race was really close to my heart and really wanted to represent France well." For the 100 metre backstroke, Pigrée swam a time of 56.40 seconds in the final of the event, which earned her the bronze medal and broke the former French record of 57.16 seconds set by Laure Manaudou in 2008. At the end of the Championships, when swimmers were ranked by their best individual performance at the Championships in terms of points earned for one swim, Pigrée ranked as the number five female competitor for her swim of 26.05 seconds in the semifinals of the 50 metre backstroke, which earned her 949 points and was rewarded with €12,000.

==== 2021 World Short Course Championships ====
For the 2021 World Short Course Championships at Etihad Arena in Abu Dhabi, United Arab Emirates in December, Pigrée entered to compete in the 50 metre backstroke and 100 metre backstroke individual events. On the first day of competition, Pigrée ranked 19th in the prelims heats of the 100 metre backstroke with a time of 58.63 seconds and did not qualify for the semifinals. In the prelims heats of the 4×50 metre medley relay on day two, Pigrée split a 24.72 for the freestyle leg of the relay, helping achieve a time of 1:48.49 and rank of ninth overall. Pigrée swam the anchor leg on the 4×50 metre mixed freestyle relay in the prelims heats as well, helping advance the relay to the final ranked sixth with her split of 24.30 seconds. For the finals relay, Marie Wattel substituted in for Pigrée and the relay placed sixth. On the fourth day, Pigrée swam a 26.39 in prelims heat seven of the 50 metre backstroke, tied Maaike de Waard of the Netherlands and both swimmers qualified for the semifinals ranking fifth. In the semifinals Pigrée ranked fifth with a time of 26.07 seconds and qualified for the final. For the final of the 50 metre backstroke Pigrée set a new French record with a time of 25.96 and placed fourth overall, finishing one-tenth of a second behind bronze medalist Louise Hansson of Sweden. Day six, the final day of competition, Pigrée helped qualify the 4×50 metre freestyle relay team to the final ranking sixth, splitting a 24.74 for the third leg of the relay. She anchored the relay in 24.43 in the final, helping achieve a seventh-place finish.

=== 2022 ===
At the 2022 French National Championships in Limoges Métropole, Pigrée placed fourth in the 100 metre backstroke with a time of 1:01.22 seconds. The third day of competition, she achieved a 2022 World Aquatics Championships qualifying time of 27.72 seconds and second-place finish in the 50 metre backstroke. On day five, she placed fourth in the final of the 50 metre butterfly with a time of 26.73 seconds. For the 50 metre freestyle on the sixth and final day, she finished seventh in the final with a time of 25.81 seconds, which was less than one second behind first-place finisher Marie Wattel.

==== 2022 World Aquatics Championships ====
2022 World Championships (LC)
Bronze medal – third place	50 m backstroke	27.40

For the 2022 World Aquatics Championships, with pool swimming competition conducted at Danube Arena in Budapest, Hungary in June, Pigrée entered to compete in two individual events, the 100 metre backstroke, with an entry time of 59.88 seconds she achieved in December 2021 during the qualifying period, and the 50 metre backstroke, with an entry time of 27.41 seconds she achieved on 9 December 2021 and in the qualifying period. On the second day of pool swimming competition, she qualified for the semifinals of the 100 metre backstroke with a time of 1:01.13 and overall 16th rank in the preliminaries. In the semifinals, she placed sixteenth with a time of 1:01.59 and did not advance to the final. On day four, she ranked fifth in the preliminaries of the 50 metre backstroke, qualifying for the semifinals with a time of 27.75 seconds. For the semifinals, she set a new French record in the event with a time of 27.29 seconds, which was 0.31 seconds off the world record of 26.98 seconds set by Liu Xiang of China in 2018, and qualified for the final the following day ranking second. In the final, she won the bronze medal with a time of 27.40 seconds.

==== 2022 European Aquatics Championships ====
2022 European Championships (LC)
Gold medal – first place	50 m backstroke	27.27 (NR)

On the third day of the 2022 European Aquatics Championships, held in August in Rome, Italy, Pigrée ranked first in the prelims heats of the 50 metre backstroke with a time of 27.53 seconds and qualified for the semifinals. She ranked third in the semifinals, finishing in a time of 27.68 seconds and qualifying for the final. In the final, swimming in the outdoor pool at Foro Italico (Stadio Olimpico del Nuoto), she won the gold medal with a personal best and French record time of 27.27 seconds. The gold medal and European title marked her first time achieving a title at an international, continental or world, championships. In the preliminaries of the 100 metre backstroke the following day, she ranked tenth overall with a time of 1:01.24 and did not qualify for the semifinals as she was not one of the two fastest swimmers representing France.

In October, at the 2022 FINA Swimming World Cup in Berlin, Germany, Pigrée competed in three individual events, placing thirteenth in the 50 metre backstroke with a 26.92, eighteenth in the 100 metre backstroke with a time of 59.22 seconds, and 24th in the 50 metre freestyle with a 25.16.

==== 2022 World Short Course Championships ====
Day one of the 2022 World Short Course Championships in December in Melbourne, Australia, Pigrée placed twenty-fourth in the 100 metre backstroke on day one with a time of 58.50 seconds. On the third morning, she qualified for the semifinals of the 50 metre backstroke from the morning preliminaries, where she ranked sixteenth with a time of 26.54 seconds. In the evening, she lowered her time and placed eleventh with a 26.26. The morning of day five, she led-off the 4×50 metre medley relay with a time of 26.49 seconds, helping qualify the relay for the final ranking third with a French record time of 1:44.86. In the final, she lowered her time to a 26.30 to help finish in a French record time of 1:43.96 and place sixth.

=== 2023 ===
In February 2023, at the 44th Alejandro López Swimming Trophy in Spain, Pigrée won the long course 50 metre backstroke in a circuit record time of 28.15 seconds, which lowered the record by 0.10 seconds from the former mark set in 2011, as well as the 100 metre freestyle and 100 metre backstroke to win the overall female title, which was determined based on a FINA points system. The following month, she won the 50 metre backstroke with a time of 27.65 seconds at the 2023 Mediterranean Open in Marseille, earning 929 FINA points and an overall ranking of first amongst all swims by female competitors at the competition, which was 24 points ahead of the second highest-scoring swim, 905 points, by Sarah Sjöström of Sweden in the 50 metre butterfly with a time of 25.25 seconds.

At the 2023 Mare Nostrum stop in May in Canet-en-Roussillon, Pigrée won the gold medal in the women's 50 metre backstroke with a time of 27.92 seconds, which was the only time faster than 28.00 seconds. She also tied for seventh in the final of the 100 metre backstroke with a 1:01.13. On the second day of the 2023 French Elite Swimming Championships the following month in Rennes, she won the silver medal in the 100 metre backstroke with a personal best and 2023 World Aquatics Championships qualifying time of 59.79 seconds. With a 27.61 in the final of the 50 metre backstroke the following day, she won the gold medal and achieved another 2023 World Championships qualifying time. The fourth day, she placed second in the b-final of the 100 metre freestyle with a personal best time of 55.69 seconds. On the following evening, she won the bronze medal in the 50 metre butterfly, finishing 1.62 seconds behind gold medalist Mélanie Henique with a time of 26.86 seconds.

== International championships (50 m) ==
Meet	50 backstroke	100 backstroke
WC 2022 (age: 20)	(bronze) (27.40)	16th (1:01.59)
EC 2022 (age: 21)	(gold) (27.27 NR)	10th (h) (1:01.24)

== International championships (25 m) ==
Meet	50 freestyle	50 backstroke	100 backstroke	4×50 freestyle	4×50 medley	4×50 mixed freestyle	4×50 mixed medley
EC 2021 (age: 20)	12th (24.45)	(silver) (26.08)	(bronze) (56.40 NR)				14th (split 26.14, bk leg)
WC 2021 (age: 20)		4th (25.96 NR)	19th (58.63)	7th (split 24.43, 4th leg)	9th (split 24.72, fr leg)	6th^{[a]} (split 24.30, 4th leg)	
WC 2022 (age: 21)		11th (26.26)	24th (58.50)		6th (split 26.30, bk leg)		

^{a} Prigrée swam only in the prelims heats.

== Personal best times ==
=== Long course metres (50 m pool) ===
Event	Time		Meet	Location	Date	Notes	Ref
100 m freestyle	55.69	b	2023 French Elite Championships	Rennes	14 June 2023		
50 m backstroke	27.27		2022 European Aquatics Championships	Rome, Italy	14 August 2022	NR	
100 m backstroke	59.79		2023 French Elite Championships	Rennes	12 June 2023		
50 m butterfly	26.68		2021 French Winter National Championships	Chartres	19 June 2021		

Legend: NR – French record;
Records not set in finals: h – heat; sf – semifinal; r – relay 1st leg; rh – relay heat 1st leg; b – B final; † – en route to final mark; so – swim-off; tt – time trial

=== Short course metres (25 m pool) ===
Event	Time		Meet	Location	Date	Notes	Ref
50 m freestyle	24.44	h	2021 European Short Course Championships	Kazan, Russia	2 November 2021		
50 m backstroke	25.96		2021 World Short Course Championships	Abu Dhabi, United Arab Emirates	20 December 2021	NR	
100 m backstroke	56.40		2021 European Short Course Championships	Kazan, Russia	6 November 2021	NR	
50 m butterfly	26.69		2018 French Short Course Championships	Montpellier	16 November 2018		

Legend: NR – French record;
Records not set in finals: h – heat; sf – semifinal; r – relay 1st leg; rh – relay heat 1st leg; b – B final; † – en route to final mark; so – swim-off; tt – time trial

== National records ==
=== Long course metres (50 m pool) ===
No.	Event	Time		Meet	Location	Date	Status	Ref
1	50 m backstroke	27.81	h	2021 French Championships	Chartres	18 June 2021	Former	
2	50 m backstroke (2)	27.59		2021 French Championships	Chartres	18 June 2021	Former	
3	50 m backstroke (3)	27.39		2021 Spanish Summer Open Championships	Las Palmas, Spain	3 August 2021	Former	
4	50 m backstroke (4)	27.29	sf	2022 World Aquatics Championships	Budapest, Hungary	21 June 2022	Former	
5	50 m backstroke (5)	27.27		2022 European Aquatics Championships	Rome, Italy	14 August 2022	Current	

Legend: h – heat; sf – semifinal

=== Short course metres (25 m pool) ===
No.	Event	Time		Meet	Location	Date	Status	Ref
1	100 m backstroke	56.40		2021 European Short Course Championships	Kazan, Russia	6 November 2021	Current	
2	50 m backstroke	25.96		2021 World Short Course Championships	Abu Dhabi, United Arab Emirates	20 December 2021	Current	
3	4×50 m medley	1:44.86	h	2022 World Short Course Championships	Melbourne, Australia	17 December 2022	Former	
4	4×50 m medley	1:43.96		2022 World Short Course Championships	Melbourne, Australia	17 December 2022	Current	

Legend: h – preliminary heat

== See also ==
- List of French records in swimming
- List of European Short Course Swimming Championships medalists (women)
