= 2021 FINA World Swimming Championships (25 m) – Women's 4 × 50 metre freestyle relay =

Swimming competition

Women's 4 × 50 metre freestyle relay at the 2021 FINA World Swimming Championships (25 m)
- Venue: Etihad Arena
- Location: Abu Dhabi, United Arab Emirates
- Dates: 21 December (heats and final)
- Competitors: 50 from 11 nations
- Teams: 11
- Winning time: 1:34.22

Medalists
gold medal	Abbey Weitzeil; Claire Curzan; Katharine Berkoff; Kate Douglass; Torri Huske	United States
silver medal	Sarah Sjöström; Michelle Coleman; Sara Junevik; Louise Hansson; Hanna Rosvall	Sweden
bronze medal	Kim Busch; Maaike de Waard; Kira Toussaint; Ranomi Kromowidjojo; Marrit Steenbergen; Tessa Giele	Netherlands

The Women's 4 × 50 metre freestyle relay competition of the 2021 FINA World Swimming Championships (25 m) was held on 21 December 2021.

== Records ==
Prior to the competition, the existing world and championship records were as follows.

World record	Netherlands (NED)	1:32.50	Eindhoven, Netherlands	12 December 2020
Competition record	United States (USA)	1:34.03	Hangzhou, China	16 December 2018

== Results ==
=== Heats ===
The heats were started at 09:30.

Rank	Heat	Lane	Nation	Swimmers	Time	Notes
1	1	6	United States	Katharine Berkoff (24.43); Torri Huske (24.44); Kate Douglass (23.39); Abbey Weitzeil (23.62)	1:35.88	Q
2	1	4	Netherlands	Kim Busch (24.30); Marrit Steenbergen (24.16); Tessa Giele (23.95); Maaike de Waard (23.86)	1:36.27	Q
3	2	3	Sweden	Sarah Sjöström (23.50); Michelle Coleman (23.98); Sara Junevik (24.31); Hanna Rosvall (24.76)	1:36.55	Q
4	2	4	Russian Swimming Federation	Rozaliya Nasretdinova (24.42); Daria Klepikova (24.53); Ekaterina Nikonova (24.35); Daria S. Ustinova (23.84)	1:37.14	Q
5	1	2	China	Cheng Yujie (24.59); Zhang Yufei (23.95); Zhu Menghui (24.19); Wu Qingfeng (24.76)	1:37.49	Q
6	2	5	France	Marie Wattel (24.49); Charlotte Bonnet (24.14); Analia Pigrée (24.74); Béryl Gastaldello (24.21)	1:37.58	Q
7	2	7	Canada	Kayla Sanchez (24.45); Maggie Mac Neil (24.58); Katerine Savard (25.81); Rebecca Smith (25.61)	1:40.45	Q
8	1	1	Hong Kong	Tam Hoi Lam (25.21); Stephanie Au (25.17); Chan Kin Lok (25.22); Sze Hang Yu (25.04)	1:40.64	Q
9	2	6	Turkey	Ekaterina Avramova (25.07); Selen Özbilen (25.66); Viktoriya Zeynep Güneş (24.97); Nida Eliz Üstündağ (25.93)	1:41.63	
10	1	7	Thailand	Jenjira Srisaard (24.80); Kornkarnjana Sapianchai (25.47); Kamonchanok Kwanmuang (26.27); Jinjutha Pholjamjumrus (26.35)	1:42.89	
11	2	1	South Korea	Jeong So-eun (25.37); Kim Seo-yeong (25.39); Han Da-kyung (26.88); Ryu Ji-won (26.17)	1:43.81	
	1	3	Slovakia		DNS	
	1	5	Italy		DNS	
	2	2	Singapore		DNS	

=== Final ===
The final was held at 18:00.

Rank	Lane	Nation	Swimmers	Time	Notes
1st place, gold medalist(s)	4	United States	Abbey Weitzeil (23.59); Claire Curzan (23.40); Katharine Berkoff (23.81); Kate Douglass (23.42)	1:34.22	
2nd place, silver medalist(s)	3	Sweden	Sarah Sjöström (23.33); Michelle Coleman (23.38); Sara Junevik (24.02); Louise Hansson (23.81)	1:34.54	NR
3rd place, bronze medalist(s)	5	Netherlands	Kim Busch (24.29); Maaike de Waard (23.71); Kira Toussaint (24.01); Ranomi Kromowidjojo (22.88)	1:34.89	
4	2	China	Cheng Yujie (24.27); Zhang Yufei (23.12); Zhu Menghui (23.90); Wu Qingfeng (23.71)	1:35.00	AS
5	6	Russian Swimming Federation	Maria Kameneva (23.59); Arina Surkova (23.99); Daria S. Ustinova (23.92); Rozaliya Nasretdinova (23.90)	1:35.40	
6	1	Canada	Kayla Sanchez (23.87); Maggie Mac Neil (23.50); Katerine Savard (24.46); Rebecca Smith (24.04)	1:35.87	
7	7	France	Marie Wattel (24.42); Béryl Gastaldello (23.61); Charlotte Bonnet (23.90); Analia Pigrée (24.43)	1:36.36	
8	8	Hong Kong	Tam Hoi Lam (24.70); Stephanie Au (24.68); Chan Kin Lok (25.21); Sze Hang Yu (24.76)	1:39.35	NR
