= List of Swedish records in swimming =

This is a list of Swedish records in swimming, as ratified by the Swedish Swimming Federation (Swedish: Svenska Simförbundet). All records were achieved in finals unless otherwise noted.

== Long course (50 m) ==
=== Men ===
Event	Time		Name	Club	Date	Meet	Location	Ref
50 m freestyle	21.45	sf, NR	Stefan Nystrand	Sweden	31 July 2009	World Championships	Rome, Italy	
100 m freestyle	47.37	NR	Stefan Nystrand	Sweden	30 July 2009	World Championships	Rome, Italy	
200 m freestyle	1:45.91		Robin Hanson	Spårvägen Simförening	29 June 2025	Swedish Championships	Norrköping, Sweden	
400 m freestyle	3:44.68		Victor Johansson	Sweden	27 July 2025	World Championships	Singapore, Singapore	
800 m freestyle	7:44.81	h	Victor Johansson	Sweden	29 July 2025	World Championships	Singapore, Singapore	
1500 m freestyle	14:58.59		Victor Johansson	Jönköpings SS	2 July 2022	Swedish Championships	Linköping, Sweden	
50 m backstroke	24.79	h, NR	Björn Seeliger	Sweden	14 August 2022	European Championships	Rome, Italy	
100 m backstroke	54.70		Gustav Hökfelt	Sweden	25 June 2021	Sette Colli Trophy	Rome, Italy	
200 m backstroke	1:59.29		Mattias Carlsson	Uddevalla Sim	10 April 2014	Swim Cup	Eindhoven, Netherlands	
50 m breaststroke	27.02	sf, NR	Johannes Skagius	Sweden	25 July 2017	World Championships	Budapest, Hungary	
100 m breaststroke	1:00.08	h	Erik Persson	Sweden	23 July 2017	World Championships	Budapest, Hungary	
200 m breaststroke	2:07.66	NR	Erik Persson	Sweden	20 May 2021	European Championships	Budapest, Hungary	
50 m butterfly	23.46	tt	Oskar Hoff	Landskrona Simsällskap	28 June 2025	Swedish Championships	Norrköping, Sweden	
100 m butterfly	52.00		Lars Frölander	Sweden	22 September 2000	Olympic Games	Sydney, Australia	
200 m butterfly	1:56.46	h	Simon Sjödin	Sweden	8 August 2016	Olympic Games	Rio de Janeiro, Brazil	
200m individual medley	1:58.02	h, NR	Simon Sjödin	Sweden	31 July 2013	World Championships	Barcelona, Spain	
400m individual medley	4:17.32		Adam Paulsson	Sweden	10 July 2019	Universiade	Naples, Italy	
4×50m freestyle relay	1:30.97	NR	Oscar Ekström (23.19); Alexander Nyström (22.19); Christoffer Carlsen (22.63); Gustav Åberg Lejdström (22.94)	Sweden	24 July 2014	Portuguese Open Championships	Oeiras, Portugal	
4×100m freestyle relay	3:11.92	NR	Petter Stymne (49.17); Lars Frölander (48.02); Stefan Nystrand (47.25); Jonas Persson (47.48)	Sweden	11 August 2008	Olympic Games	Beijing, China	
4×200m freestyle relay	7:10.02	h	Robin Hanson (1:46.71); Ludvig Bartolek (1:46.65); Victor Johansson (1:47.46); Charlie Skoglund Macmillan (1:49.20)	Sweden	10 August 2026	European Championships	Paris, France	
4×50m medley relay	1:41.01		Christoffer Carlsen (26.47); Johannes Skagius (27.71); Alexander Nyström (24.27); Oscar Ekström (22.56)	Sweden	26 July 2014	Portuguese Open Championships	Oeiras, Portugal	
4×100m medley relay	3:35.83	h	Simon Sjödin (55.27); Jonas Andersson (1:01.22); Lars Frölander (51.13); Jonas Persson (48.21)	Sweden	15 August 2008	Olympic Games	Beijing, China	

Legend: # – Record awaiting ratification by Swedish Swimming Federation; WR – World record; ER – European record; NR – Nordic record; e – equalled existing record;
Records not set in finals: h – heat; sf – semifinal; r – relay 1st leg; rh – relay heat 1st leg; b – B final; † – en route to final mark; so – swim-off; tt – time trial

=== Women ===
Event	Time		Name	Club	Date	Meet	Location	Ref
50m freestyle	23.61	sf, ER	Sarah Sjöström	Sweden	29 July 2023	World Championships	Fukuoka, Japan	
100m freestyle	51.71	r, ER	Sarah Sjöström	Sweden	23 July 2017	World Championships	Budapest, Hungary	
200m freestyle	1:54.08	NR	Sarah Sjöström	Sweden	9 August 2016	Olympic Games	Rio de Janeiro, Brazil	
400m freestyle	4:06.04		Sarah Sjöström	Södertörns SS	16 March 2014	Golden Lanes	Amiens, France	
800m freestyle	8:31.52		Thilda Häll	Sweden	11 August 2026	European Championships	Paris, France	
1500m freestyle	16:25.99		Thilda Häll	University of Louisville	21 May 2026	TYR Pro Swim Series	Sacramento, United States	
50m backstroke	27.80		Sarah Sjöström	Södertörns SS	30 June 2017	Swedish Championships	Borås, Sweden	
100m backstroke	59.62		Michelle Coleman	Sweden	26 June 2021	Sette Colli Trophy	Rome, Italy	
200m backstroke	2:10.56		Michelle Coleman	Spårvägens SF	10 April 2014	Swim Cup	Eindhoven, Netherlands	
50m breaststroke	30.05	NR	Jennie Johansson	Sweden	9 August 2015	World Championships	Kazan, Russia	
100m breaststroke	1:05.66	h, NR	Sophie Hansson	Sweden	25 July 2021	Olympic Games	Tokyo, Japan	
200m breaststroke	2:22.24	sf, NR	Joline Höstman	Sweden	30 July 2009	World Championships	Rome, Italy	
50m butterfly	24.43	WR	Sarah Sjöström	Södertörns SS	5 July 2014	Swedish Championships	Borås, Sweden	
100m butterfly	55.48	ER	Sarah Sjöström	Sweden	7 August 2016	Olympic Games	Rio de Janeiro, Brazil	
200m butterfly	2:07.83	sf	Martina Granström	Sweden	31 July 2012	Olympic Games	London, Great Britain	
200m individual medley	2:12.29	sf, =	Stina Gardell	Sweden	23 May 2012	European Championships	Debrecen, Hungary	
200m individual medley	2:12.29	=	Stina Gardell	Sweden	24 May 2012	European Championships	Debrecen, Hungary	
400m individual medley	4:38.46		Stina Gardell	Sweden	21 May 2012	European Championships	Debrecen, Hungary	
4×50m freestyle relay	1:41.81	NR	Michelle Coleman (25.36); Magdalena Kuras (25.16); Ida Lindborg (25.42); Jessica Eriksson (25.87)	Sweden	24 July 2014	Portuguese Open Championships	Oeiras, Portugal	
4×100m freestyle relay	3:33.79	NR	Sarah Sjöström (52.53); Michelle Coleman (52.98); Sara Junevik (54.41); Louise Hansson (53.87)	Sweden	27 July 2024	Olympic Games	Paris, France	
4×200m freestyle relay	7:50.24	NR	Sarah Sjöström (1:54.31); Louise Hansson (1:57.72); Michelle Coleman (1:57.36); Ida Marko-Varga (2:00.85)	Sweden	6 August 2015	World Championships	Kazan, Russia	
4×50m medley relay	1:48.91	NR	Ida Lindborg (28.95); Jennie Johansson (30.37); Sarah Sjöström (24.83); Michelle Coleman (24.76)	Sweden	26 July 2014	Portuguese Open Championships	Oeiras, Portugal	
4×100m medley relay	3:54.27	NR	Michelle Coleman (59.75); Sophie Hansson (1:05.67); Louise Hansson (56.12); Sarah Sjöström (52.73)	Sweden	1 August 2021	Olympic Games	Tokyo, Japan	

Legend: # – Record awaiting ratification by Swedish Swimming Federation; WR – World record; ER – European record; NR – Nordic record; e – equalled existing record;
Records not set in finals: h – heat; sf – semifinal; r – relay 1st leg; rh – relay heat 1st leg; b – B final; † – en route to final mark; so – swim-off; tt – time trial

=== Mixed relay ===
Event	Time		Name	Club	Date	Meet	Location	Ref
4×100 m freestyle relay	3:23.40	NR	Björn Seeliger (48.09); Robin Hanson (48.91); Sarah Sjöström (52.68); Louise Hansson (53.72)	Sweden	15 August 2022	European Championships	Rome, Italy	
4×200 m freestyle relay	7:32.10	NR	Robin Hanson (1:46.71); Ludvig Bartolek (1:48.10); Elvira Mörtstrand (1:59.04); Sofia Åstedt (1:58.25)	Sweden	15 August 2026	European Championships	Paris, France	
4×100 m medley relay	3:45.85	h, NR	Hannah Rosvall (1:00.37); Erik Persson (1:00.12); Louise Hansson (57.05); Björn Seeliger (48.31)	Sweden	26 July 2023	World Championships	Fukuoka, Japan	

Legend: # – Record awaiting ratification by Swedish Swimming Federation; WR – World record; ER – European record; NR – Nordic record; e – equalled existing record;
Records not set in finals: h – heat; so – swim-off

== Short course (25 m) ==
=== Men ===
Event	Time		Name	Club	Date	Meet	Location	Ref
50m freestyle	20.70	NR	Stefan Nystrand	Sweden	15 November 2009	World Cup	Berlin, Germany	
100m freestyle	45.54	NR	Stefan Nystrand	Sweden	10 November 2009	World Cup	Stockholm, Sweden	
200m freestyle	1:41.81		Robin Hanson	Sweden	4 December 2025	European Championships	Lublin, Poland	
400m freestyle	3:37.73	h	Victor Johansson	Sweden	2 December 2025	European Championships	Lublin, Poland	
800m freestyle	7:31.38		Victor Johansson	Sweden	6 December 2025	European Championships	Lublin, Poland	
1500m freestyle	14:23.98	h	Victor Johansson	Sweden	3 December 2025	European Championships	Lublin, Poland	
50m backstroke	23.17		Björn Seeliger	SK Neptun	26 November 2023	Swedish Championships	Gothenburg, Sweden	
100m backstroke	50.82	rh	Samuel Törnqvist	Sweden	15 December 2024	World Championships	Budapest, Hungary	
200m backstroke	1:52.46		Samuel Törnqvist	Spårvägen Simförening	23 November 2024	Swedish Championships	Helsingborg, Sweden	
50m breaststroke	26.17	h, =	Johannes Skagius	Sweden	15 December 2018	World Championships	Hangzhou, China	
50m breaststroke	26.17	sf, =	Daniel Kertes	Sweden	14 December 2024	World Championships	Budapest, Hungary	
100m breaststroke	57.30	h	Oliver Munn	Unattached	29 October 2026	World Championship Trials	Westmont, United States	
200m breaststroke	2:02.18		Erik Persson	Sweden	6 November 2021	European Championships	Kazan, Russia	
50m butterfly	22.58	sf	Oskar Hoff	Sweden	8 December 2023	European Championships	Otopeni, Romania	
100m butterfly	50.44		Lars Frölander	Sweden	17 March 2000	World Championships	Athens, Greece	
200m butterfly	1:52.89		Simon Sjödin	Sweden	6 December 2015	European Championships	Netanya, Israel	
100m individual medley	52.51	sf	Simon Sjödin	Sweden	15 December 2012	World Championships	Istanbul, Turkey	
200m individual medley	1:54.17		Simon Sjödin	SK Neptun	5 November 2016	Swedish Championships	Stockholm, Sweden	
400m individual medley	4:05.06	NR	Simon Sjödin	Sweden	3 December 2015	European Championships	Netanya, Israel	
4×50m freestyle relay	1:24.19	NR	Petter Stymne (21.41); Marcus Piehl (20.97); Per Nylin (21.15); Stefan Nystrand (20.66)	Sweden	16 December 2007	European Championships	Debrecen, Hungary	
4×100m freestyle relay	3:09.53	NR	Petter Stymne (48.41); Stefan Nystrand (45.29); Christoffer Vikström (48.61); Simon Sjödin (47.22)	SK Neptun	26 November 2009	Swedish Championships	Gothenburg, Sweden	
4×200m freestyle relay	6:59.35		Gustaf Dahlman (1:46.79); Christoffer Carlsen (1:42.53); Simon Sjödin (1:44.18); Adam Paulsson (1:45.85)	Sweden	14 December 2018	World Championships	Hangzhou, China	
4×50m medley relay	1:33.34	h	Charlie Skoglund Macmillan (23.92); Daniel Kertes (26.04); Melker Rosengren (22.48); Elias Persson (20.90)	Sweden	7 December 2025	European Championships	Lublin, Poland	
4×100m medley relay	3:26.19	h	Samuel Törnqvist (50.82); Daniel Kertes (57.31); Robin Hanson (51.06); Elias Persson (47.00)	Sweden	15 December 2024	World Championships	Budapest, Hungary	

Legend: # – Record awaiting ratification by Swedish Swimming Federation; WR – World record; ER – European record; NR – Nordic record; e – equalled existing record;
Records not set in finals: h – heat; sf – semifinal; r – relay 1st leg; rh – relay heat 1st leg; b – B final; † – en route to final mark; so – swim-off; tt – time trial

=== Women ===
Event	Time		Name	Club	Date	Meet	Location	Ref
50 m freestyle	23.00	NR	Sarah Sjöström	Sweden	7 August 2017	World Cup	Berlin, Germany	
100 m freestyle	50.58	ER	Sarah Sjöström	Sweden	11 August 2017	World Cup	Eindhoven, Netherlands	
200 m freestyle	1:50.43	ER	Sarah Sjöström	Sweden	12 August 2017	World Cup	Eindhoven, Netherlands	
400 m freestyle	4:02.33		Sarah Sjöström	Södertörns SS	20 November 2014	Swedish Championships	Stockholm, Sweden	
800 m freestyle	8:19.28		Gabriella Fagundez	Canet 66 Natation	7 December 2007	French Championships	Nîmes, France	
1500 m freestyle	16:06.45		Thilda Häll	Simklubben Elfsborg	7 November 2025	Swedish Games	Upplands Väsby, Sweden	
50 m backstroke	25.83	sf, NR	Louise Hansson	Sweden	19 December 2021	World Championships	Abu Dhabi, United Arab Emirates	
100 m backstroke	55.20	NR	Louise Hansson	Sweden	17 December 2021	World Championships	Abu Dhabi, United Arab Emirates	
200 m backstroke	2:03.26	NR	Michelle Coleman	Spårvägens SF	22 November 2014	Swedish Championships	Stockholm, Sweden	
50 m breaststroke	29.53		Sophie Hansson	Loughborough; University	18 November 2023	BUCS Championships	Sheffield, Great Britain	
100 m breaststroke	1:03.50	NR	Sophie Hansson	Sweden	20 December 2021	World Championships	Abu Dhabi, United Arab Emirates	
200 m breaststroke	2:18.13		Sophie Hansson	Sweden	21 December 2021	World Championships	Abu Dhabi, United Arab Emirates	
50 m butterfly	24.38	ER	Therese Alshammar	Sweden	21 November 2009	World Cup	Singapore	
100 m butterfly	54.61	ER	Sarah Sjöström	Sweden	7 December 2014	World Championships	Doha, Qatar	
200 m butterfly	2:03.82	NR	Petra Granlund	Sweden	10 December 2009	European Championships	Istanbul, Turkey	
100m individual medley	57.10	NR	Sarah Sjöström	Sweden	2 August 2017	World Cup	Moscow, Russia	
200m individual medley	2:06.29	NR	Louise Hansson	Helsingborgs SS	4 November 2015	Swedish Championships	Helsingborg, Sweden	
400m individual medley	4:31.70	NR	Stina Gardell	Sweden	13 December 2009	European Championships	Istanbul, Turkey	
4×50m freestyle relay	1:34.54	NR	Sarah Sjöström (23.33); Michelle Coleman (23.38); Sara Junevik (24.02); Louise Hansson (23.81)	Sweden	21 December 2021	World Championships	Abu Dhabi, United Arab Emirates	
4×100m freestyle relay	3:28.80	NR	Sarah Sjöström (51.45); Michelle Coleman (52.06); Sophie Hansson (53.41); Louise Hansson (51.88)	Sweden	16 December 2021	World Championships	Abu Dhabi, United Arab Emirates	
4×200m freestyle relay	7:41.91	NR	Gabriella Fagundez (1:56.42); Sarah Sjöström (1:54.88); Ida Marko Varga (1:55.31); Petra Granlund (1:55.30)	Sweden	15 December 2010	World Championships	Dubai, United Arab Emirates	
4×50m medley relay	1:42.38	=WR	Louise Hansson (25.91); Sophie Hansson (29.07); Sarah Sjöström (23.96); Michelle Coleman (23.44)	Sweden	17 December 2021	World Championships	Abu Dhabi, United Arab Emirates	
4×100m medley relay	3:46.20	ER	Louise Hansson (56.25); Sophie Hansson (1:03.70); Sarah Sjöström (54.65); Michelle Coleman (51.60)	Sweden	21 December 2021	World Championships	Abu Dhabi, United Arab Emirates	

Legend: # – Record awaiting ratification by Swedish Swimming Federation; WR – World record; ER – European record; NR – Nordic record; e – equalled existing record;
Records not set in finals: h – heat; sf – semifinal; r – relay 1st leg; rh – relay heat 1st leg; b – B final; † – en route to final mark; so – swim-off; tt – time trial

=== Mixed relay ===
Event	Time		Name	Club	Date	Meet	Location	Ref
4×50 m freestyle relay	1:30.27		Isak Eliasson (21.82); Gustav Hökfelt (21.56); Sarah Sjöström (22.89); Sara Junevik (24.00)	Sweden	6 November 2021	European Championships	Glasgow, Great Britain	
4×50 m medley relay	1:37.05	NR	Louise Hansson (26.07); Daniel Kertes (25.48); Sara Junevik (24.49); Elias Persson (21.01)	Sweden	11 December 2024	World Championships	Budapest, Hungary	
4×100 m medley relay	3:38.15	h, NR	Samuel Törnqvist (51.05); Daniel Kertes (57.95); Sara Junevik (56.48); Sofia Åstedt (52.67)	Sweden	14 December 2024	World Championships	Budapest, Hungary	

Legend: # – Record awaiting ratification by Swedish Swimming Federation; e – equalled existing record;
Records not set in finals: h – heat; so – swim-off
