= 2022 FINA World Swimming Championships (25 m) – Women's 100 metre butterfly =

Swimming competition

Women's 100 metre butterfly at the 2022 FINA World Swimming Championships (25 m)
- Venue: Melbourne Sports and Aquatic Centre
- Location: Melbourne, Australia
- Dates: 17 December (heats and semifinals); 18 December (final)
- Competitors: 29 from 25 nations
- Winning time: 54.05 WR

Medalists
gold medal	Maggie Mac Neil	Canada
silver medal	Torri Huske	United States
bronze medal	Louise Hansson	Sweden

The Women's 100 metre butterfly competition of the 2022 FINA World Swimming Championships (25 m) was held on 17 and 18 December 2022.

== Records ==
Prior to the competition, the existing world and championship records were as follows.

World record	Kelsi Dahlia (USA)	54.59	Eindhoven, Netherlands	3 December 2021
Competition record	Sarah Sjöström (SWE)	54.61	Doha, Qatar	7 December 2014

The following records was established during the competition:

Date	Event	Name	Nationality	Time	Record
18 December	Final	Maggie Mac Neil	Canada	54.05	WR

== Results ==
=== Heats ===
The heats were started on 17 December at 12:05.

Rank	Heat	Lane	Name	Nationality	Time	Notes
1	3	4	Louise Hansson	Sweden	55.74	Q
2	3	5	Torri Huske	United States	56.01	Q
3	3	6	Alexandria Perkins	Australia	56.46	Q
4	4	4	Maggie Mac Neil	Canada	56.53	Q
5	2	7	Angelina Köhler	Germany	56.56	Q
6	2	6	Maaike de Waard	Netherlands	56.67	Q
7	3	3	Ai Soma	Japan	56.72	Q
8	4	7	Katerine Savard	Canada	56.86	Q
9	2	5	Lana Pudar	Bosnia and Herzegovina	56.89	Q
10	2	4	Claire Curzan	United States	56.90	Q
11	3	7	Helena Rosendahl Bach	Denmark	57.15	Q
12	2	3	Moe Tsuda	Japan	57.22	Q
13	2	1	Kim Seo-yeong	South Korea	57.26	Q, NR
14	4	6	Giovanna Diamante	Brazil	57.50	Q
15	4	2	Helena Gasson	New Zealand	57.51	Q
16	2	2	Brittany Castelluzzo	Australia	57.85	QSO
16	3	2	Laura Lahtinen	Finland	57.85	QSO
18	3	1	Amina Kajtaz	Croatia	57.88	NR
19	4	1	Rebecca Meder	South Africa	58.04	
20	3	8	Sze Hang-yu	Hong Kong	58.06	
21	2	8	Barbora Janíčková	Czech Republic	58.65	
22	4	8	Luana Alonso	Paraguay	58.93	
23	1	6	Zora Ripková	Slovakia	59.39	
24	1	4	Krystal Lara	Dominican Republic	59.78	NR
25	1	5	Olivia Borg	Samoa	1:00.13	NR
26	1	7	Julimar Ávila	Honduras	1:01.43	NR
27	1	3	Oumy Diop	Senegal	1:01.54	NR
28	1	2	Imara-Bella Thorpe	Suspended Member Federation	1:01.84	
29	1	1	Tara Naluwoza	Uganda	1:05.28	NR
	4	3	Wang Yichun	China	Did not start	
	4	5	Zhang Yufei	China	Did not start	

==== Swim-off ====
The swim-off was held on 17 December at 13:33.

Rank	Lane	Name	Nationality	Time	Notes
1	5	Laura Lahtinen	Finland	56.88	Q, NR
2	4	Brittany Castelluzzo	Australia	57.76	

=== Semifinals ===
The semifinals were started on 17 December at 21:07.

Rank	Heat	Lane	Name	Nationality	Time	Notes
1	1	4	Torri Huske	United States	55.23	Q
2	2	4	Louise Hansson	Sweden	55.78	Q
3	1	5	Maggie Mac Neil	Canada	55.83	Q
4	2	3	Angelina Köhler	Germany	56.23	Q, NR
5	1	2	Claire Curzan	United States	56.37	Q, WD
6	2	5	Alexandria Perkins	Australia	56.39	Q
7	1	3	Maaike de Waard	Netherlands	56.40	Q
8	1	6	Katerine Savard	Canada	56.44	Q
9	2	6	Ai Soma	Japan	56.51	Q
10	2	2	Lana Pudar	Bosnia and Herzegovina	56.71	
11	2	1	Kim Seo-yeong	South Korea	57.07	NR
12	1	2	Giovanna Diamante	Brazil	57.13	
13	2	7	Helena Rosendahl Bach	Denmark	57.21	
14	2	8	Helena Gasson	New Zealand	57.23	
15	1	7	Moe Tsuda	Japan	57.25	
16	1	8	Laura Lahtinen	Finland	58.09	

=== Final ===
The final was held on 18 December at 19:35.

Rank	Lane	Nation	Swimmers	Time	Notes
1st place, gold medalist(s)	3	Maggie Mac Neil	Canada	54.05	WR
2nd place, silver medalist(s)	4	Torri Huske	United States	54.75	
3rd place, bronze medalist(s)	5	Louise Hansson	Sweden	54.87	
4	6	Angelina Köhler	Germany	56.20	NR
5	8	Ai Soma	Japan	56.27	
6	2	Alexandria Perkins	Australia	56.34	
7	7	Maaike de Waard	Netherlands	56.52	
8	1	Katerine Savard	Canada	56.87	
