= Swimming at the 2022 European Aquatics Championships – Women's 4 × 100 metre medley relay =

Women's 4 × 100 metre medley relay at the 2022 European Aquatics Championships
- Venue: Foro Italico
- Dates: 17 August
- Competitors: 52 from 10 nations
- Teams: 10
- Winning time: 3:55.25

Medalists
gold medal	Hanna Rosvall; Sophie Hansson; Louise Hansson; Sarah Sjöström	Sweden
silver medal	Pauline Mahieu; Charlotte Bonnet; Marie Wattel; Béryl Gastaldello; Emma Terebo; Adèle Blanchetière	France
bronze medal	Kira Toussaint; Tes Schouten; Maaike de Waard; Marrit Steenbergen; Tessa Giele; Valerie van Roon	Netherlands

The Women's 4 × 100 metre medley relay competition of the 2022 European Aquatics Championships was held on 17 August 2022.

== Records ==
Prior to the competition, the existing European and championship records were as follows.

	Team	Time	Location	Date
World record	United States	3:50.40	Gwangju	28 July 2019
European record	Russia	3:53.38	Budapest	30 July 2017
Championship record	Great Britain	3:54.01	Budapest	23 May 2021

== Results ==
=== Heats ===
The heats were started at 09:57.

Rank	Heat	Lane	Nation	Swimmers	Time	Notes
1	1	5	Sweden	Hanna Rosvall (1:01.10); Sophie Hansson (1:07.11); Louise Hansson (56.97); Sarah Sjöström (54.01)	3:59.19	Q
2	1	4	Italy	Silvia Scalia (1:00.67); Lisa Angiolini (1:06.75); Elena Di Liddo (57.83); Chiara Tarantino (55.33)	4:00.58	Q
3	2	6	Netherlands	Kira Toussaint (1:00.73); Tes Schouten (1:07.21); Tessa Giele (59.06); Valerie van Roon (54.59)	4:01.59	Q
4	2	4	Great Britain	Medi Harris (1:00.68); Kara Hanlon (1:08.19); Holly Hibbott (1:00.80); Anna Hopkin (53.54)	4:03.21	Q
5	1	2	France	Emma Terebo (1:00.97); Adèle Blanchetière (1:09.66); Marie Wattel (59.33); Béryl Gastaldello (53.63)	4:03.59	Q
6	2	3	Poland	Laura Bernat (1:01.88); Dominika Sztandera (1:08.94); Julia Maik (59.13); Anna Dowgiert (54.91)	4:04.86	Q
7	1	6	Switzerland	Nina Kost (1:02.40); Lisa Mamié (1:08.40); Julia Ullmann (59.79); Maria Ugolkova (54.69)	4:05.28	Q
8	2	7	Germany	Johanna Roas (1:02.08); Bente Fischer (1:09.63); Angelina Köhler (58.23); Nele Schulze (55.47)	4:05.41	Q
9	1	7	Spain	Carmen Weiler (1:02.15); Jessica Vall (1:07.90); Carla Hurtado (1:01.06); Lidón Muñoz (54.67)	4:05.78	
10	2	2	Denmark	Karoline Sørensen (1:03.13); Thea Blomsterberg (1:07.98); Elisabeth Sabro Ebbesen (1:00.99); Julie Kepp Jensen (54.68)	4:06.78	
	1	3	Austria		Did not start	
	2	5	Hungary		Did not start	

=== Final ===
The final was held at 19:16.

Rank	Lane	Nation	Swimmers	Time	Notes
1st place, gold medalist(s)	4	Sweden	Hanna Rosvall (1:00.66); Sophie Hansson (1:06.26); Louise Hansson (56.29); Sarah Sjöström (52.04)	3:55.25	
2nd place, silver medalist(s)	2	France	Pauline Mahieu (1:00.17); Charlotte Bonnet (1:06.49); Marie Wattel (56.09); Béryl Gastaldello (53.61)	3:56.36	NR
3rd place, bronze medalist(s)	3	Netherlands	Kira Toussaint (1:00.29); Tes Schouten (1:06.75); Maaike de Waard (57.74); Marrit Steenbergen (52.23)	3:57.01	NR
4	5	Italy	Margherita Panziera (59.78); Benedetta Pilato (1:05.65); Ilaria Bianchi (58.37); Silvia Di Pietro (53.43)	3:57.23	
5	6	Great Britain	Medi Harris (1:00.09); Kara Hanlon (1:07.49); Keanna MacInnes (58.62); Freya Anderson (53.85)	4:00.05	
6	7	Poland	Paulina Peda (1:01.09); Dominika Sztandera (1:08.47); Julia Maik (58.73); Aleksandra Polańska (54.24)	4:02.53	NR
7	1	Switzerland	Nina Kost (1:02.53); Lisa Mamié (1:07.05); Julia Ullmann (59.69); Maria Ugolkova (54.67)	4:03.94	
8	8	Germany	Johanna Roas (1:02.11); Bente Fischer (1:09.59); Angelina Köhler (58.61 ) Nele Schulze (55.29)	4:05.60	
