= Sam Bailey (disambiguation) =

Sam Bailey (born 1977) is an English singer who won the tenth series of The X Factor in 2013.

Sam or Samantha Bailey may also refer to:

- Sam Bailey (coach) (1924–2010), American college football, basketball, and baseball coach
- Sam Bailey (director) (born 1989), American writer and director
- Sam Wesley Bailey, namesake of the Sam Bailey Building, a historic school building in Griffin, Georgia, U.S.
- Samantha Bailey (actress) (born 2001), American child actress
- Samantha M. Bailey, Canadian writer

== See also ==
- Samantha Bayley, British artistic gymnast
- Samuel Bailey (1791–1870), British philosopher and writer
- Sam Bayley (1878–?), English footballer
