= Poland at the 2022 World Aquatics Championships =

- Flag of Poland
- World Aquatics code: POL
- National federation: Polish Swimming Association
- Website: polswim.pl (in Polish)

in Budapest, Hungary
- Competitors: 16 in 3 sports
- Medals Ranked 18th: Gold 0 Silver 1 Bronze 1 Total 2

World Aquatics Championships appearances
- 1973; 1975; 1978; 1982; 1986; 1991; 1994; 1998; 2001; 2003; 2005; 2007; 2009; 2011; 2013; 2015; 2017; 2019; 2022; 2023; 2024; 2025

Poland competed at the 2022 World Aquatics Championships in Budapest, Hungary from 17 June to 3 July.

== Medalists ==
Medal	Name	Sport	Event	Date
Bronze	Ksawery Masiuk	Swimming	Men's 50 metre backstroke	June 25
Silver	Katarzyna Wasick	Swimming	Women's 50 metre freestyle	June 25

== Diving ==
Poland entered four divers.

Men

Athlete	Event	Preliminaries		Semifinals		Final	
Athlete	Event	Points	Rank	Points	Rank	Points	Rank
Robert Łukasiewicz	10 m platform	332.10	24	did not advance			
Andrzej Rzeszutek	1 m springboard	322.90	24	—N/a		did not advance	
Andrzej Rzeszutek	3 m springboard	315.35	38	did not advance			

Women

Athlete	Event	Preliminaries		Semifinals		Final	
Athlete	Event	Points	Rank	Points	Rank	Points	Rank
Aleksandra Błażowkska	1 m springboard	216.15	27	—N/a		did not advance	
Aleksandra Błażowkska	3 m springboard	199.50	33	did not advance			
Kaja Skrzek	1 m springboard	228.20	20	—N/a		did not advance	

== Open water swimming ==
Poland qualified one male open water swimmer.

Men

Athlete	Event	Time	Rank
Krzysztof Chmielewski	Men's 10 km	2:00:54.9	34

== Swimming ==
Poland entered 12 swimmers.

Men

Athlete	Event	Heat		Semifinal		Final	
Athlete	Event	Time	Rank	Time	Rank	Time	Rank
Krzysztof Chmielewski	1500 m freestyle	15:07.70	10	—N/a		did not advance	
Krzysztof Chmielewski	200 m butterfly	1:55.73	6 Q	1:55.01	9	did not advance	
Konrad Czerniak	50 m freestyle	22.48	28	did not advance			
Konrad Czerniak	50 m butterfly	23.53	16 QSO; 23.38 Q	23.50	16	did not advance	
Paweł Juraszek	50 m freestyle	21.97	10 Q	22.01	14	did not advance	
Radosław Kawęcki	200 m backstroke	2:00.69	20	did not advance			
Jakub Majerski	100 m butterfly	51.50	6 Q	51.24	6 Q	51.35	7
Ksawery Masiuk	50 m backstroke	24.64	5 Q	24.48	5 Q	24.49	3rd place, bronze medalist(s)
Ksawery Masiuk	100 m backstroke	53.33	5 Q	52.58	4 Q	52.75	6
Tomasz Polewka	50 m backstroke	25.10	13 Q	25.28	16	did not advance	
Paweł Smoliński	50 m butterfly	23.78	31	did not advance			
Dawid Wiekiera	100 m breaststroke	1:00.80	17	did not advance			
Dawid Wiekiera	200 m breaststroke	2:10.86	12 Q	DSQ		did not advance	

Women

Athlete	Event	Heat		Semifinal		Final	
Athlete	Event	Time	Rank	Time	Rank	Time	Rank
Laura Bernat	200 m backstroke	2:11.48	10 Q	2:10.87	11	did not advance	
Paulina Peda	50 m backstroke	28.47	16 Q	28.11	14	did not advance	
Paulina Peda	100 m backstroke	1:00.83	13 Q	1:00.88	15	did not advance	
Katarzyna Wasick	50 m freestyle	24.45	2 Q	24.11	1 Q	24.18	2nd place, silver medalist(s)
