= 2021 FINA World Swimming Championships (25 m) – Women's 100 metre butterfly =

Swimming competition

Women's 100 metre butterfly at the 2021 FINA World Swimming Championships (25 m)
- Venue: Etihad Arena
- Location: Abu Dhabi, United Arab Emirates
- Dates: 20 December (heats and semifinals); 21 December (final)
- Competitors: 41 from 35 nations
- Winning time: 55.04

Medalists
gold medal	Maggie Mac Neil	Canada
silver medal	Louise Hansson	Sweden
bronze medal	Claire Curzan	United States

The Women's 100 metre butterfly competition of the 2021 FINA World Swimming Championships (25 m) was held on 20 and 21 December 2021.

== Records ==
Prior to the competition, the existing world and championship records were as follows.

World record	Kelsi Dahlia (USA)	54.59	Eindhoven, Netherlands	3 December 2021
Competition record	Sarah Sjöström (SWE)	54.61	Doha, Qatar	7 December 2014

== Results ==
=== Heats ===
The heats were started on 20 December at 10:12.

Rank	Heat	Lane	Name	Nationality	Time	Notes
1	5	4	Louise Hansson	Sweden	56.04	Q
2	5	6	Claire Curzan	United States	56.46	Q
3	5	5	Zhang Yufei	China	56.47	Q, WD
4	3	5	Torri Huske	United States	56.59	Q
5	5	2	Lana Pudar	Bosnia and Herzegovina	56.87	Q
6	4	3	Elena Di Liddo	Italy	56.95	Q
7	5	3	Marie Wattel	France	57.03	Q
8	4	6	Svetlana Chimrova	Russian Swimming Federation	57.04	Q
9	4	2	Maria Ugolkova	Switzerland	57.15	Q
10	3	1	Farida Osman	Egypt	57.18	Q
11	3	7	Giovanna Diamante	Brazil	57.22	Q
12	4	1	Katerine Savard	Canada	57.23	Q, WD
13	5	7	Tessa Giele	Netherlands	57.24	Q
14	4	4	Maggie Mac Neil	Canada	57.32	Q
14	5	9	Ellen Walshe	Ireland	57.32	Q, NR
16	3	2	Ilaria Bianchi	Italy	57.40	Q
17	4	5	Anastasiya Shkurdai	Belarus	57.57	Q
18	3	3	Anna Ntountounaki	Greece	57.60	Q
19	5	8	Anastasiya Kuliashova	Belarus	57.77	
20	3	6	Emilie Beckmann	Denmark	57.80	
21	4	7	Daria Klepikova	Russian Swimming Federation	57.86	
22	4	8	Jeong So-eun	South Korea	58.40	
23	3	9	María Mata	Mexico	58.95	
24	3	8	Yu Yiting	China	58.96	
25	5	1	Laura Lahtinen	Finland	59.05	
26	5	0	Chan Kin Lok	Hong Kong	59.46	
27	2	4	Luana Alonso	Paraguay	59.68	NR
28	3	0	Tayla Lovemore	South Africa	1:00.20	
29	2	3	Lê Thị Mỹ Thảo	Vietnam	1:01.38	NR
29	2	5	Krystal Lara	Dominican Republic	1:01.38	
31	2	6	Mariam Sheikhalizadeh	Azerbaijan	1:01.96	
32	2	1	Oumy Diop	Senegal	1:02.51	
33	2	7	Luna Chabat	Uruguay	1:02.54	
34	2	8	Karla Abarca	Nicaragua	1:03.43	
35	2	2	Lia Lima	Angola	1:03.94	
36	2	9	Antsa Rabejaona	Madagascar	1:05.80	
37	2	0	Sara Akasha	United Arab Emirates	1:06.30	
38	1	2	Mei-Li Tan Minnich	Cambodia	1:08.68	NR
39	1	6	Dirngulbai Misech	Palau	1:09.42	
40	1	5	Mineri Gomez	Guam	1:14.43	
41	1	4	Alyse Maniriho	Burundi	1:29.56	
	1	3	Mst Sonia Khatun	Bangladesh	DNS	
	3	4	Béryl Gastaldello	France	DNS	
	4	0	Quah Jing Wen	Singapore	DNS	
	4	9	Tamara Potocká	Slovakia	DNS	

=== Semifinals ===
The semifinals were started on 20 December at 18:32.

Rank	Heat	Lane	Name	Nationality	Time	Notes
1	1	7	Maggie Mac Neil	Canada	55.45	Q
2	1	4	Claire Curzan	United States	55.64	Q, =WJ
3	2	4	Louise Hansson	Sweden	55.81	Q
4	2	5	Torri Huske	United States	56.13	Q
5	2	3	Elena Di Liddo	Italy	56.21	Q
6	1	5	Lana Pudar	Bosnia and Herzegovina	56.28	Q, NR
7	2	8	Anastasiya Shkurdai	Belarus	56.42	Q
8	2	2	Farida Osman	Egypt	56.62	Q
9	2	1	Ellen Walshe	Ireland	56.68	NR
10	2	6	Svetlana Chimrova	Russian Swimming Federation	56.78	
11	1	8	Anna Ntountounaki	Greece	56.87	
12	1	2	Giovanna Diamante	Brazil	56.88	
12	2	7	Tessa Giele	Netherlands	56.88	
14	1	3	Marie Wattel	France	56.99	
15	1	1	Ilaria Bianchi	Italy	57.03	
16	1	6	Maria Ugolkova	Switzerland	57.42	

=== Final ===
The final was held on 21 December at 19:10.

Rank	Lane	Name	Nationality	Time	Notes
1st place, gold medalist(s)	4	Maggie Mac Neil	Canada	55.04	NR
2nd place, silver medalist(s)	3	Louise Hansson	Sweden	55.10	
3rd place, bronze medalist(s)	5	Claire Curzan	United States	55.39	WJ
4	6	Torri Huske	United States	55.75	
5	2	Elena Di Liddo	Italy	56.34	
6	1	Anastasiya Shkurdai	Belarus	56.37	
7	7	Lana Pudar	Bosnia and Herzegovina	56.51	
8	8	Farida Osman	Egypt	57.01	
