= Masniari Wolf =

Indonesian swimmer (born 2005)

Personal information
- National team: Indonesia
- Born: 2 December 2005 (age 20) Wiesbaden, Germany
- Height: 165 cm (5 ft 5 in)

Sport
- Sport: Swimming
- Strokes: Backstroke
- Club: SG Frankfurt
Medal record
Women's swimming
Representing Indonesia
SEA Games
Gold medal – first place	2021 Vietnam	50 m backstroke
Gold medal – first place	2023 Cambodia	50 m backstroke
Gold medal – first place	2025 Thailand	50 m backstroke

Masniari Wolf (born 2 December 2005) is an Indonesian swimmer who specializes in backstroke. In the 2021 SEA Games, she won a gold medal in 50 m backstroke, first gold for Indonesia in women's swimming in 11 years. Wolf competed in the women's 50 metre and 100 metre backstroke at the 2022 World Aquatics Championships.
