= Samantha M. Bailey =

Canadian writer

Samantha M. Bailey is a Canadian writer of thriller novels from Toronto, Ontario, whose 2022 novel Watch Out for Her was selected for the 2025 edition of Canada Reads.

Bailey published her debut novel, Woman on the Edge, in 2019. The book, which became an international bestseller, was optioned by Wildling Pictures and Little Mama Media in 2024 for development as a film.

Watch Out for Her, Bailey's second novel, was published in 2022, and was followed by A Friend in the Dark in 2024.

Watch Out for Her was defended in Canada Reads by Olympic swimmer Maggie Mac Neil.
