= Maggie Mac Neil =

Canadian swimmer (born 2000)

Maggie Mac Neil OLY
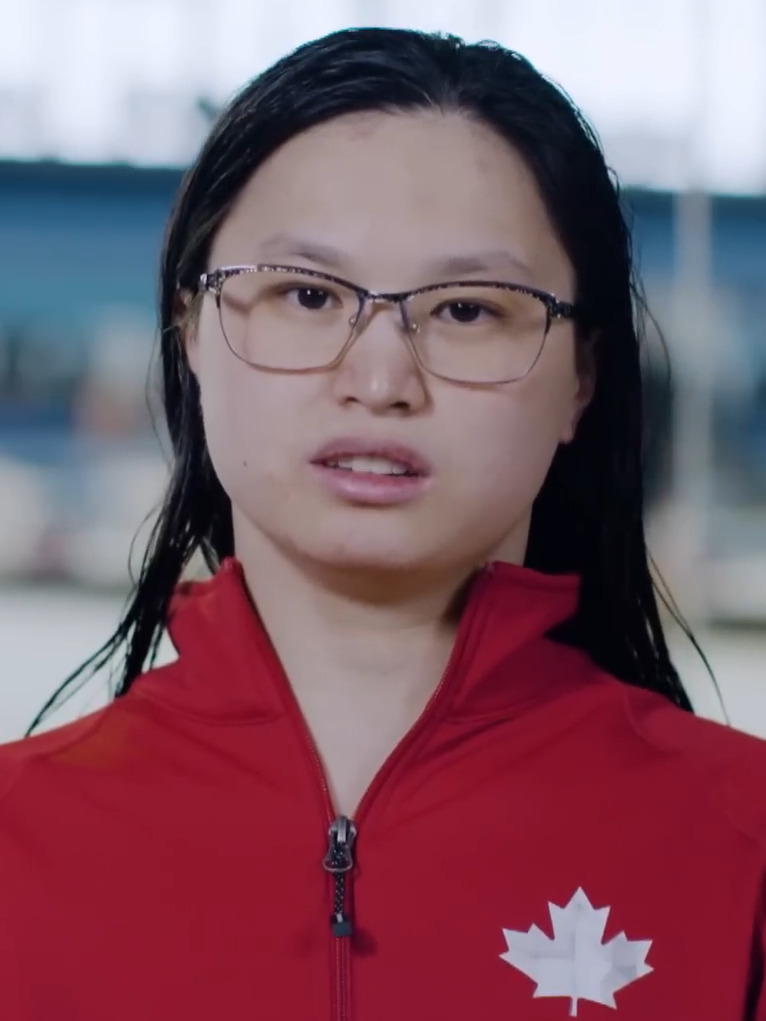
- Mac Neil in 2021

Personal information
- Full name: Hannah Margaret McNair Mac Neil
- National team: Canada
- Born: 26 February 2000 (age 26) Jiujiang, Jiangxi, China
- Height: 169 cm (5 ft 7 in)

Sport
- Sport: Swimming
- Strokes: Butterfly, backstroke, freestyle
- Club: London Aquatic Club
- College team: University of Michigan; Louisiana State University
Medal record
Women's swimming
Representing Canada
Event	1st	2nd	3rd
Olympic Games	1	1	1
World Championships (LC)	1	3	4
World Championships (SC)	7	1	3
Commonwealth Games	1	2	2
Pan American Games	5	1	1
Total	15	8	11
Olympic Games
Gold medal – first place	2020 Tokyo	100 m butterfly
Silver medal – second place	2020 Tokyo	4×100 m freestyle
Bronze medal – third place	2020 Tokyo	4×100 m medley
World Championships (LC)
Gold medal – first place	2019 Gwangju	100 m butterfly
Silver medal – second place	2022 Budapest	4×100 m freestyle
Silver medal – second place	2022 Budapest	4×100 m mixed freestyle
Silver medal – second place	2023 Fukuoka	100 m butterfly
Bronze medal – third place	2019 Gwangju	4×100 m freestyle
Bronze medal – third place	2019 Gwangju	4×100 m medley
Bronze medal – third place	2022 Budapest	4×100 m medley
Bronze medal – third place	2023 Fukuoka	4×100 m medley
World Championships (SC)
Gold medal – first place	2021 Abu Dhabi	50 m backstroke
Gold medal – first place	2021 Abu Dhabi	100 m butterfly
Gold medal – first place	2021 Abu Dhabi	4×100 m freestyle
Gold medal – first place	2021 Abu Dhabi	4×50 m mixed freestyle
Gold medal – first place	2022 Melbourne	50 m backstroke
Gold medal – first place	2022 Melbourne	50 m butterfly
Gold medal – first place	2022 Melbourne	100 m butterfly
Silver medal – second place	2021 Abu Dhabi	4×100 m medley
Bronze medal – third place	2022 Melbourne	4×100 m freestyle
Bronze medal – third place	2022 Melbourne	4×100 m medley
Bronze medal – third place	2022 Melbourne	4×50 m mixed medley
Commonwealth Games
Gold medal – first place	2022 Birmingham	100 m butterfly
Silver medal – second place	2022 Birmingham	4×100 m medley
Silver medal – second place	2022 Birmingham	4×100 m mixed medley
Bronze medal – third place	2022 Birmingham	4×100 m freestyle
Bronze medal – third place	2022 Birmingham	4×100 m mixed freestyle
Pan American Games
Gold medal – first place	2023 Santiago	50 m freestyle
Gold medal – first place	2023 Santiago	100 m butterfly
Gold medal – first place	2023 Santiago	100 m freestyle
Gold medal – first place	2023 Santiago	4×100 m freestyle
Gold medal – first place	2023 Santiago	4×100 m medley
Silver medal – second place	2023 Santiago	4×100 m mixed medley
Bronze medal – third place	2023 Santiago	4×100 m mixed freestyle
Junior Pan Pacific Championships
Gold medal – first place	2018 Suva	100 m butterfly
Silver medal – second place	2018 Suva	4×100 m medley
Silver medal – second place	2018 Suva	4×100 m mixed medley
Bronze medal – third place	2018 Suva	4×100 m freestyle

Hannah Margaret McNair Mac Neil (Note: Her surname is sometimes incorrectly rendered as MacNeil in news reporting and television graphics.) OLY (born 26 February 2000) is a Canadian former competitive swimmer. A 100 metre butterfly event specialist, she is the 2020 Olympic champion, 2019 World (LC) champion, two-time World (SC) champion (2021, 2022), 2022 Commonwealth champion, and 2023 Pan American champion. She held the short course world record, and still holds the Commonwealth record, and Pan American record in the event.

One of Canada's most accomplished swimmers, she is a three-time Olympic medallist, eight-time World (LC) medallist, eleven-time World (SC) medallist, and five-time Commonwealth medallist. She also held the world record in the short course 50 metre backstroke. She announced her retirement on 26 September 2024.

== Early life ==
Mac Neil was born in Jiujiang, China, in February 2000 and was adopted by her Canadian family a year later. Growing up in London, Ontario, Mac Neil's first competitive experience as a swimmer came with the team of the school she first took lessons from. She would later cite the 2008 Summer Olympics in Beijing as the point where she "started to take swimming seriously and knew that I wanted to pursue it further." She competed for Sir Frederick Banting Secondary School and the London Aquatic Club prior to her acceptance at the University of Michigan.

== College career ==
Competing for the University of Michigan, Mac Neil first tied the NCAA record for the 100 yard butterfly, and then broke it at the 2021 NCAA Swimming and Diving Championships in March 2021. She was the first in the NCAA to post a time under 49 seconds (48.89), and the first Michigan swimmer to win an NCAA title since 2008. She went on to win a second gold medal at the same championship, taking the 100 yard freestyle title.

Mac Neil concluded her time at the University of Michigan with two bronze medals at the 2022 NCAA Division I Women's Swimming and Diving Championships. A slip and fall on the pool deck while attending the championships resulted in a "slight" elbow fracture that required rehabilitation.

On 25 March 2022, she announced that she would be transferring to finish her final year of NCAA eligibility at the University of California, Berkeley, where she would be beginning graduate studies in sports management. However, in June she announced that she had changed her plans, and would instead be transferring to Louisiana State University to compete with the LSU Lady Tigers. The move reunited her with former Michigan coach Rick Bishop, and was speculated by Swimming World to have been connected to a burgeoning scandal surrounding Berkeley swim coach Teri McKeever.

In her final appearance at the SEC championships, Mac Neil helped the Lady Tigers win a record fifth gold medal. Winning three individual gold medals, she was named the female swimmer of the meet. She concluded her college career at the 2023 NCAA Division I Women's Swimming and Diving Championships, setting a record time in the 50 yard freestyle event and winning the gold medal. She also won a silver medal in the 100 yard butterfly and the bronze in the 100 yard freestyle. Mac Neil subsequently indicated that she would continue training under Bishop at LSU even though no longer competing collegiately, through to the 2024 Summer Olympics.

== Professional career ==
=== 2015–2018 ===
After various age group successes domestically, Mac Neil appeared in her first international competition in 2015, winning two butterfly finals at the Arena Pro Swim Series in Orlando. Performing well at the 2015 Canadian trials, she was selected to make her major international debut at the 2015 FINA World Junior Swimming Championships in Singapore. In preparation for that event, she was part of a Canadian team sent to the Australian age group national competition in Sydney. She called it a "great experience" to compete at the Sydney Olympic Park Aquatic Centre, the site of swimming competitions at the 2000 Summer Olympics. Her best result in Singapore was twentieth in the heats of the 100 m butterfly. The following year, Mac Neil placed sixth in the 100 m butterfly event trials for Canada's 2016 Olympic team. Based on her trial results, she was assigned to compete at the 2016 Junior Pan Pacific Swimming Championships in Maui, where her best individual placement was fifth in the 100 m butterfly.

In 2017, Mac Neil missed qualification for the 2017 FINA World Junior Swimming Championships, a significant disappointment for her. She improved the following year, doing sufficiently well at the 2018 Canadian national trials to qualify for the 2018 Pan Pacific Swimming Championships, earning the FINA "A" standard in both the 100 m freestyle and 100 m butterfly, finishing the runner-up in the latter event behind reigning Olympic silver medallist Penny Oleksiak. However, she opted to decline the assignment in order to focus on the 2018 Junior Pan Pacific Swimming Championships, explaining that while she was "over the moon to have qualified," she wanted to focus on her more competitive event. Competing in Fiji, Mac Neil won her first major international medals, most notably her first championship title in the 100 m butterfly, where she set an event record of 58.38. She also won three relay medals as part of the Canadian women's teams.

=== 2019–2021 ===
Mac Neil was part of the Canadian women's team at the 2019 World Aquatics Championships in Gwangju. She first won a bronze medal as part of the 4×100 m freestyle relay team, alongside Penny Oleksiak, Taylor Ruck, Kayla Sanchez, and Rebecca Smith. Mac Neil then competed in and won gold in the women's 100 metre butterfly, beating four-time World and reigning Olympic champion Sarah Sjöström, in what was considered a major upset. She closed out the championships as part of the Canadian 4×100 m medley team, swimming the final with Kylie Masse, Sydney Pickrem and Oleksiak. The team finished third, winning Mac Neil's second bronze medal of the event, and setting a record of eight medals for Canada at a single world championship. Her plans for the 2020 international season were significantly disrupted by the onset of the COVID-19 pandemic, which ultimately delayed the Summer Olympics by a full year.

In June 2021, Mac Neil qualified to represent Canada at the 2020 Summer Olympics in Tokyo. Mac Neil first competed as part of the Canadian team for the 4×100 m freestyle relay, replacing Ruck for the event final and swimming a 53.47 second split to help take the silver medal, Mac Neil's first Olympic medal. The following day, Mac Neil competed in the final of the 100 m butterfly event, taking the gold medal by a margin of 0.05 seconds over China's Zhang Yufei, setting a new personal best and Americas record of 55.59. She was the first Canadian gold medallist of the 2020 Tokyo Games. Mac Neil wears glasses, and without contacts or prescription goggles, could not immediately see her results; it took her a few seconds to focus on the results board and realize she won gold. Cameras focused on her squinting at the results board, and she said after that "I was just trying to squint and see where I came. I heard my name getting called, so I knew I must have done something good." Mac Neil's final event was the 4×100 m medley relay, where she posted a 55.27 time in her leg of the relay and the Canadian team won the bronze medal, Mac Neil's third of the Olympics. The Association of National Olympic Committees subsequently named her the "Best Female Athlete of Tokyo 2020".

At the end of the year, Mac Neil was part of the Canadian delegation to the 2021 FINA World Swimming Championships (25 m) in Abu Dhabi, the top international event competed in a short course pool. She won the gold medal in the 50 m backstroke, setting a new world record in the process, afterwards admitting that she would never have expected to set her first world record in that stroke. She won gold as well in the 100 m butterfly with a national record time of 55.04, making her the first woman to hold Olympic, World Aquatic, World Swimming, and NCAA titles in the same event simultaneously, and the second person to do so after Aaron Peirsol. She won three other medals, two gold and a silver, in relay events at the championships. She was one of seven finalists for the 2021 Lou Marsh Trophy, awarded annually to Canada's top athlete.

=== 2022 ===
In the months following the Olympics, Mac Neil had begun to struggle with the weight of expectations on her, and following discussions with Swimming Canada's high performance staff, opted not to attempt a defence of her World title at the 2022 World Aquatics Championships. She instead planned to participate in relay events there, and then return to competing the butterfly at the 2022 Commonwealth Games later in the year. Reflecting on the decision, she said "it's hard to stay at the top and that pressure really got to me. I need a chill summer."

Beginning the World Aquatics Championships in the 4 × 100 m freestyle relay, Mac Neil was part of Canada's silver medal-winning team, a first for Canadian women at the World Championships. Mac Neil swam the anchor leg for the Canadian team in the heats of the 4 × 100 m mixed freestyle relay, helping them qualify to the event final in second place. She was replaced by Penny Oleksiak in the final, but shared in the team's silver medal win. In her final event of the championships, Mac Neil swam the butterfly leg in both the heats and the final of the 4 × 100 m medley relay, winning another bronze medal with the Canadian team.

Named to her first Commonwealth Games team, Mac Neil began the first day of the championships by winning the bronze medal in the mixed 4 × 100 m freestyle relay, and qualifying to the event final of the 100 m butterfly with the second-fastest time in both the heats and semi-finals. On the second day of the Games, Mac Neil set a Games record to win gold in the 100 m butterfly, ousting defending champion Emma McKeon by 0.02 seconds, and shortly afterwards won a second bronze medal in the 4 × 100 m freestyle relay. In the relay she was credited with a "dominant anchor leg" that nearly took the Canadian team into second place. Mac Neil called her decision to step back from competing individual events "the best decision I made for myself at the time, both physically and emotionally." She finished fourth in the 50 m butterfly, but then won two silver medals swimming the butterfly legs of the 4 × 100 m mixed medley and 4 × 100 m medley relays, finishing the Birmingham Games with five medals.

Mac Neil concluded the year at the 2022 FINA World Swimming Championships in Melbourne. In her first individual event, she won gold in the 50 m butterfly, tying American rival Torri Huske with a time of 24.64, a national record. She won a second gold medal in the 50 m backstroke, improving her own previous world record time to 25.25. Her third and final gold medal of the event came in the 100 m butterfly, where she won in a world record time of 54.05, out-touching Huske by 0.70 seconds. Mac Neil also won three bronze medals in the relay events, and was named the female swimmer of the championship. Speaking afterwards, she reflected that after "a rocky first half of the year" she was "enjoying swimming more than ever."

=== 2023–2024 ===
Mac Neil began the 2023 World Aquatics Championships as part of the Canadian 4 × 100 m freestyle relay team; with key member Oleksiak absent and Ruck recovering from a hand injury, the team finished seventh. That same day she qualified to the final of the 100 m butterfly, coming third in the semi-finals. In the event final the following day, Mac Neil led going into the final quarter of the race, but was overtaken in the final stage by China's Zhang, and won the silver medal in 56.45. She said afterward that "there's some things to work on for next year. I'm more happy with second place than the time." Midweek, she appeared as part of the Canada team in both the mixed 4 × 100 m medley and mixed 4 × 100 m freestyle relays, finishing sixth and fourth, respectively. Mac Neil competed in the 50 m butterfly, but did not advance out of the heats. In her final races of the championships, she won her eighth World Aquatics medal, a bronze, in the 4 × 100 m medley relay.

She concluded her 2023 season by leading the Canadian team into the 2023 Pan American Games in Santiago. Mac Neil started the games by helping Canada to gold in the women's 4 × 100 m relay, swimming the third leg of the relay as the beat out the United States for the gold. She followed up this victory with a win in her signature event the 100 m butterfly setting a Pan American Games Record in the process. Mac Neil won her third gold medal of the games, when she won the women's 100 m freestyle later on that Sunday. On Tuesday, Mac Neil won her fourth gold medal of the games in the 50 m freestyle, tying the record for most gold medals at a single Pan American Games by a Canadian. She said of her two freestyle golds that "I'm happy that I could tie for the win. It's still new swimming freestyle for me internationally. The good thing is this is obviously one of my weaker events – I really miss having that extra wall. So I'm really happy with that." She would break the record the next day when she helped the team to gold in the women's 4 × 100 m medley relay, swimming the third butterfly leg. She had also added a silver and bronze in the 4 × 100 mixed medley and 4 × 100 mixed freestyle relays respectively. After her record setting games she said spoke of her freestyle wins saying that "once the 100 fly was over, I really wanted that title and that was the only thing I was really thinking going into the meet. Because it was my first time swimming freestyle internationally, I felt relaxed anyway. I had nothing really to lose. It was a lot of racing for me, but it's always good practice, especially this early on in the season" and she added she hoped to add more relay medals for her teammates at the 2024 Summer Olympics saying that "I want to be able to step up for them and hopefully we get another medal in Paris."

As with most of the Canadian team's top swimmers, Mac Neil opted not to attend the 2024 World Aquatics Championships in Doha, citing its proximity to the Summer Olympics. In Paris, she began by participating in the 4 × 100 m freestyle relay, where the Canadian team finished fourth. Mac Neil next attempted to defend her Olympic title in the 100 m butterfly, but fell short, finishing in fifth place, 0.23 seconds behind bronze medalist Zhang Yufei. She went on to make two further appearances in relay events, with the Canadian team coming fifth in the mixed 4 × 100 m medley and fourth in the women's 4 × 100 m medley. Speaking of the latter, her last Olympic race, Mac Neil called it "hard," but added "it's been a long week, and it's what we trained for. We put up a good fight today."

Mac Neil announced her retirement from swimming in September 2024, saying she was "excited to begin the next chapter of my life journey, as I embark on discovering who I am outside of swimming."

In 2025, she is slated to appear in Canada Reads, advocating for Samantha M. Bailey's novel Watch Out for Her.

== Personal life ==
Mac Neil studied psychology at the University of Michigan starting in 2018. In 2022, she began her Master of Science in sports management at Louisiana State University, graduating in May 2024.

Mac Neil has indicated she plans to attend law school.

== Honours and awards ==
- King Charles III Coronation Medal
- Best Female Athlete of Santiago 2023
- 2023 YMCA of Southwestern Ontario Young Woman of Excellence
- Best Female Athlete of the Championships, 2022 SCW Melbourne
- 2021 ANOC Award, "Best Female Athlete of Tokyo 2020".

== Results ==
=== Championships ===
Meet	50 back	50 fly	100 fly	4×50 free	4×100 free	4×50 medley	4×100 medley	4×50 mixed free	4×100 mixed free	4×50 mixed medley	4×100 mixed medley
WC 2019			1st place, gold medalist(s)		3rd place, bronze medalist(s)		3rd place, bronze medalist(s)		5th		5th
OG 2021			1st place, gold medalist(s)		2nd place, silver medalist(s)		3rd place, bronze medalist(s)				
SCW 2021	1st place, gold medalist(s)		1st place, gold medalist(s)	6th	1st place, gold medalist(s)	4th	2nd place, silver medalist(s)	1st place, gold medalist(s)			
WC 2022					2nd place, silver medalist(s)		3rd place, bronze medalist(s)		2nd place, silver medalist(s)		
SCW 2022	1st place, gold medalist(s)	1st place, gold medalist(s)	1st place, gold medalist(s)		3rd place, bronze medalist(s)	4th	3rd place, bronze medalist(s)			3rd place, bronze medalist(s)	
WC 2023			2nd place, silver medalist(s)		7th		3rd place, bronze medalist(s)		4th		6th

== Personal bests ==
=== Long course (50-meter pool) ===
Event	Time	Venue	Date	Notes
50 m butterfly	26.14	Nambu University Municipal Aquatics Center, Gwangju	26 July 2019	
50 m freestyle	24.78	Toronto Pan Am Sports Centre$4,	28 May 2021	
100 m butterfly	55.59	Tokyo Aquatics Centre, Tokyo	26 July 2021	Former AM, CR, NR
100 m freestyle	53.31	La Defense Arena, Paris	27 July 2024	

=== Short course (25-meter pool) ===
Event	Time	Venue	Date	Notes
50 m backstroke	25.25	Melbourne Sports and Aquatic Centre, Melbourne	16 December 2022	NR, Former WR
50 m butterfly	24.64	Melbourne Sports and Aquatic Centre, Melbourne	14 December 2022	NR
100 m backstroke	56.16	FINA World Cup Series, Berlin	30 September 2021	
100 m butterfly	54.05	Melbourne Sports and Aquatic Centre, Melbourne	18 December 2022	NR, Former WR

== World records ==
=== Short Course (25m) ===
No.	Event	Time	Meet	Location	Date	Status	Ref
1	50 m backstroke	25.27	2021 World Championships (25 m)	Abu Dhabi, United Arab Emirates	20 December 2021	Former	
2	50 m backstroke (2)	25.25	2022 World Championships (25 m)	Melbourne, Australia	16 December 2022	Former	
3	100 m butterfly	54.05	2022 World Championships (25 m)	Melbourne, Australia	18 December 2022	Former	

== Notes ==
Records
Preceded by Kira Toussaint	Women's 50 metre backstroke world record holder (short course); 20 December 2021 – 13 December 2024	Succeeded by Regan Smith
Preceded by Kelsi Dahlia	Women's 100 metre butterfly world record holder (short course); 18 December 2022 – 13 December 2024	Succeeded by Gretchen Walsh
