= Mia Blaževska Eminova =

Macedonian swimmer (born 2005)

Personal information
- Nationality: Macedonian
- Born: August 4, 2005 (age 20)
- Height: 160 cm (5 ft 3 in)

Sport
- Sport: Swimming
- Strokes: Freestyle, backstroke

Mia Blaževska Eminova (born August 4, 2005) is a Macedonian swimmer who competed at the 2020 Summer Olympics in the women's 100 meter freestyle event where she finished 40th with a time of 57.19 seconds. She also competed in the 2020 European Championships in the 50 meter freestyle, 100 meter freestyle, 50 meter backstroke, and 100 meter backstroke.
