= Louise Hansson =

Swedish swimmer (born 1996)

Personal information
- Full name: Louise Maria Hansson
- National team: Sweden
- Born: 24 November 1996 (age 29) Helsingborg, Sweden
- Height: 1.87 m (6 ft 2 in)
- Weight: 71 kg (157 lb)

Sport
- Sport: Swimming
- Strokes: Freestyle, butterfly
- Club: Helsingborgs SS; Toronto Titans (ISL)
- College team: University of Southern California
Medal record
Women's swimming
Representing Sweden
Event	1st	2nd	3rd
World Championships (LC)	0	2	1
World Championships (SC)	3	2	5
European Championships (LC)	3	4	2
European Championships (SC)	0	2	1
Total	6	10	9
World Championships (LC)
Silver medal – second place	2015 Kazan	4×100 m medley
Silver medal – second place	2024 Doha	4×100 m medley
Bronze medal – third place	2024 Doha	100 m butterfly
World Championships (SC)
Gold medal – first place	2021 Abu Dhabi	100 m backstroke
Gold medal – first place	2021 Abu Dhabi	4×50 m medley
Gold medal – first place	2021 Abu Dhabi	4×100 m medley
Silver medal – second place	2021 Abu Dhabi	100 m butterfly
Silver medal – second place	2021 Abu Dhabi	4×50 m freestyle
Bronze medal – third place	2021 Abu Dhabi	4×100 m freestyle
Bronze medal – third place	2021 Abu Dhabi	50 m backstroke
Bronze medal – third place	2022 Melbourne	100 m butterfly
Bronze medal – third place	2022 Melbourne	100 m medley
Bronze medal – third place	2022 Melbourne	4×50 m medley
European Championships (LC)
Gold medal – first place	2014 Berlin	4×100 m freestyle
Gold medal – first place	2022 Rome	100 m butterfly
Gold medal – first place	2022 Rome	4×100 m medley
Silver medal – second place	2012 Debrecen	4×100 m freestyle
Silver medal – second place	2014 Berlin	4×200 m freestyle
Silver medal – second place	2014 Berlin	4×100 m medley
Silver medal – second place	2022 Rome	4×100 m freestyle
Bronze medal – third place	2016 London	4×100 m freestyle
Bronze medal – third place	2020 Budapest	100 m butterfly
Bronze medal – third place	2022 Rome	4×100 m mixed freestyle
European Championships (SC)
Gold medal – first place	2023 Otopeni	100 m butterfly
Gold medal – first place	2023 Otopeni	4x50 m medley
Gold medal – first place	2023 Otopeni	4x50 m freestyle
Silver medal – second place	2023 Otopeni	50 m backstroke
Silver medal – second place	2015 Netanya	4×50 m medley
Silver medal – second place	2017 Copenhagen	4×50 m freestyle
Silver medal – second place	2025 Lublin	4×50 m medley
Bronze medal – third place	2023 Otopeni	100 m medley
Bronze medal – third place	2015 Netanya	200 m medley
Bronze medal – third place	2025 Lublin	100 m butterfly

Louise Maria Hansson (born 24 November 1996) is a Swedish competitive swimmer, a member of Helsingborgs SS.

== Career ==
=== International Swimming League ===
In spring 2020, Hansson signed for the Toronto Titans, the first Canadian based team in the ISL. This will be the first time Louise Hansson has swum in the ISL.

=== World Championships ===
2012: Individually, at the 2012 FINA World Swimming Championships (25 m), she finished 8th in the final of the Women's 100 metre freestyle, 9th in the 50 metre butterfly, missing out on the final with one hundredth of a second, and 9th as well in the 100 metre butterfly.

2013: At the 2013 World Aquatics Championships, she finished fourth in the 4 × 100 metre freestyle relay. At the 2014 World Championships (25m) in Doha, Qatar she was a part of the relay team that finished fourth in the 4 × 100 metre medley relay.

2015: Hansson was anchoring in the relay that won a silver at the 2015 FINA World Swimming Championship in Kazan, Russia.

2016: Hansson did also participate in the 2016 Olympic Games in Rio de Janeiro. She swam 100 fly, 200 IM individually and all relays. In both 4x100 freestyle and 4x200 freestyle Sweden finished 5th.

2017: At the 2017 World Aquatic Championships in Budapest, Hansson reached 5th place in the 4x100m free and missed the 100m fly semi by 0.2 seconds.

2019: Hansson achieved 7th place in 100m fly; 6th in the 4x100m fr; and 7th in the 4x100m medley relay at the World Aquatic Championships in Gwangju, South Korea.

2021: Hansson will represent Sweden at the rescheduled 2021 Tokyo Olympics, after qualifying for the 2020 Olympic Games.

=== Other ===
2011: At the 2011 European Junior Swimming Championships, she won gold in the 50 m butterfly and a silver medal in the 50m freestyle. At the 2012 European Junior Swimming Championships, she again won gold in the 50m butterfly.

2012: At the 2012 European Aquatics Championships, she finished 9th in the 50 metre butterfly. At the 2012 European Aquatics Championships, she won a silver medal as part of the Swedish 4 × 100 m freestyle team.

She finished 9th in the 200 metre freestyle and tenth in the 200 metre individual medley and in the 100 metre butterfly at the 2014 European Aquatics Championships.

2014: She won a gold medal at the 2014 European Aquatics Championships in Berlin with her team in the 4 × 100 m freestyle, and silver medals in the 4 × 200 m freestyle, in a new Swedish record.

2015: Hansson won her first international medal in an individual event, a bronze in the 200m individual medley, at the 2015 Short Course Championships in Netanya, Israel. In the 4×50m medley relay she won a silver medal swimming the backstroke lead-off leg. Her sister Sophie swam the second (breaststroke) leg.

2016: Hansson was bronze in the 4 x 100m fr relay at the 2016 European Aquatics Championships. She also moved to Los Angeles to swim for the University of Southern California in this year.

2018: Hansson reached the finals in the 100m fly in the 2018 European Aquatics Championships in Glasgow.

== Personal records ==
The personal bests of Louise Hansson, as of 1 July 2019.

Personal records
Long course (50m)
Event	Result	Date	Location	Notes
50m freestyle	25.15	2 July 2017	Borås, Sweden	
100m freestyle	54.62	13 April 2014	Eindhoven, Netherlands	
200m freestyle	1:58.45	6 August 2015	Kazan, Russia	
400m freestyle	4:14.00	28 February 2014	Berlin, Germany	
50m backstroke	29.50	1 March 2014	Berlin, Germany	
100 m backstroke	1:00.35	3 April 2019	Toronto, Ontario, Canada	
200m backstroke	2:14.71	28 February 2014	Berlin, Germany	
50m breaststroke	34.70	7 March 2010	Berlin, Germany	
100m breaststroke	1:19.71	19 June 2010	Simrishamn, Sweden	
50m butterfly	25.84	3 April 2019	Toronto, Ontario, Canada	
100m butterfly	57.35	5 April 2019	Toronto, Ontario, Canada	
200m butterfly	2:13.25	8 July 2018	Landskrona, Sweden	
200m medley	2:12.72	31 March 2015	Berlin, Germany	NJR
400m medley	5:08.77	16 May 2010	Mölndal, Sweden	

Personal records
Short course (25m)
Event	Result	Date	Location	Notes
50m freestyle	24.52	4 November 2015	Helsingborg, Sweden	
100m freestyle	52.88	6 November 2015	Helsingborg, Sweden	
200m freestyle	1:53.98	7 November 2015	Helsingborg, Sweden	
400m freestyle	4:06.95	13 October 2013	Moscow, Russia	
800m freestyle	8:32.19	26 January 2015	Helsingborg, Sweden	NJR
50m backstroke	26.98	7 November 2015	Helsingborg, Sweden	
100m backstroke	57.74	3 December 2015	Netanya, Israel	
200m backstroke	2:11.67	18 December 2011	Helsingborg, Sweden	
50m breaststroke	39.88	9 February 2008	Hässleholm, Sweden	
100m breaststroke	1:09.53	21 March 2015	Helsingborg, Sweden	
25m butterfly	16.26	10 March 2007	Helsingborg, Sweden	
50m butterfly	25.83	23 November 2012	Helsingborg, Sweden	
100m butterfly	56.56	17 December 2017	Copenhagen, Denmark	
200m butterfly	2:10.82	14 October 2012	Stockholm, Sweden	
100m medley	58.77	5 November 2015	Helsingborg, Sweden	NJR
200m medley	2:06.29	4 November 2015	Helsingborg, Sweden	NJR
400m medley	4:40.39	5 October 2013	Helsingborg, Sweden	

== Personal ==
She lives in Ramlösa, Helsingborg, Sweden. Her younger sister Sophie Hansson is also a competitive swimmer, winner of a bronze medal at the 2014 European Junior Swimming Championships and finishing fourth in the 50 metre breaststroke at the 2014 Summer Youth Olympics. Her father Lars-Olof Hansson is the coach at her club Helsingborgs SS. She also has a younger brother Gustaf. She studies natural sciences at the Nationell Idrottsutbildning, a sport school in Helsingborg.
