= Caroline Pilhatsch =

Austrian swimmer (born 1999)

Personal information
- Nationality: Austrian
- Born: 1 March 1999 (age 27)

Sport
- Sport: Swimming
Medal record
Representing Austria
World Championships (SC)
| Silver medal – second place | 2018 Hangzhou | 50 m backstroke |

Caroline Pilhatsch (born 1 March 1999) is an Austrian swimmer. She competed in the women's 50 metre backstroke event at the 2017 World Aquatics Championships.
