= Hanna Rosvall =

Swedish swimmer (born 2000)

Personal information
- Nationality: Swedish
- Born: 10 February 2000 (age 26)

Sport
- Sport: Swimming
Medal record
Women's swimming
Representing Sweden
World Championships (LC)
Silver medal – second place	2024 Doha	4×100 m medley
World Championships (SC)
Gold medal – first place	2021 Abu Dhabi	4×50 m medley
Gold medal – first place	2021 Abu Dhabi	4×100 m medley
Silver medal – second place	2021 Abu Dhabi	4×50 m freestyle
Bronze medal – third place	2022 Melbourne	4×50 m medley
European Championships (LC)
Gold medal – first place	2022 Rome	4×100 m medley
European Championships (SC)
Gold medal – first place	2017 Copenhagen	4×50 m medley
Silver medal – second place	2021 Kazan	4×50 m medley
Silver medal – second place	2025 Lublin	4×50 m medley
European Junior Championships
Bronze medal – third place	2017 Netanya	100 m butterfly

Hanna Rosvall (born 10 February 2000) is a Swedish swimmer. She competed at the 2018 FINA World Swimming Championships (25 m) and 2021 FINA World Swimming Championships (25 m).
