= Kira Toussaint =

Dutch swimmer (born 1994)

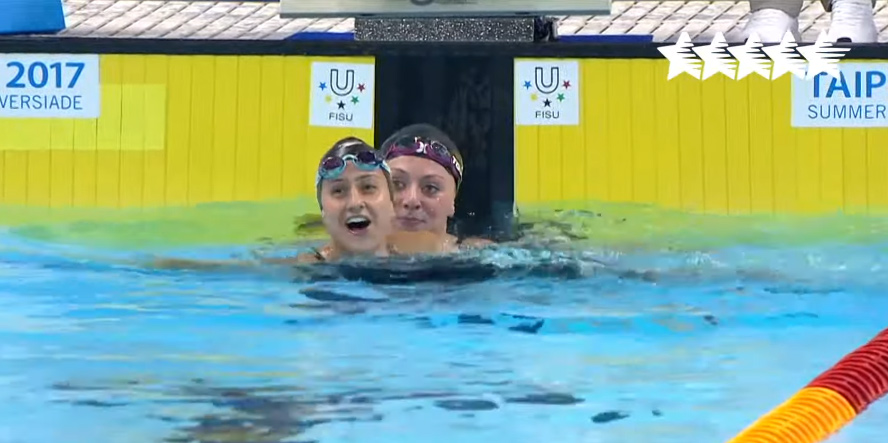
- Toussaint (right) in 2017

Personal information
- National team: Netherlands
- Born: 22 May 1994 (age 32) Amstelveen, Netherlands
- Height: 1.74 m (5 ft 9 in)
- Weight: 72 kg (159 lb)

Sport
- Sport: Swimming
- Strokes: Backstroke, freestyle
- College team: Florida Gulf Coast Eagles; Tennessee Volunteers
Medal record
Women's swimming
Representing the Netherlands
World Championships (LC)
Gold medal – first place	2024 Doha	4×100 m freestyle
Bronze medal – third place	2022 Budapest	4×100 m mixed medley
World Championships (SC)
Gold medal – first place	2021 Abu Dhabi	4×50 m mixed medley
Silver medal – second place	2021 Abu Dhabi	4×50 m mixed freestyle
Bronze medal – third place	2021 Abu Dhabi	4×50 m medley
Bronze medal – third place	2021 Abu Dhabi	4×50 m freestyle
Bronze medal – third place	2022 Melbourne	4×50 m freestyle
European Championships (LC)
Gold medal – first place	2020 Budapest	50 m backstroke
Gold medal – first place	2022 Rome	4×100 m mixed medley
Silver medal – second place	2018 Glasgow	4×100 m freestyle
Silver medal – second place	2018 Glasgow	4×100 m mixed freestyle
Silver medal – second place	2020 Budapest	4×100 m freestyle
Silver medal – second place	2020 Budapest	4×100 m mixed medley
Bronze medal – third place	2022 Rome	100 m backstroke
Bronze medal – third place	2022 Rome	4×100 m medley
European Championships (SC)
Gold medal – first place	2021 Kazan	50 m backstroke
Gold medal – first place	2021 Kazan	100 m backstroke
Gold medal – first place	2021 Kazan	200 m backstroke
Gold medal – first place	2021 Kazan	4x50 m mixed medley
Gold medal – first place	2019 Glasgow	50 m backstroke
Gold medal – first place	2019 Glasgow]	100 m backstroke
Gold medal – first place	2019 Glasgow	4×50 m freestyle
Gold medal – first place	2017 Copenhagen	4×50 m freestyle
Gold medal – first place	2017 Copenhagen	4×50 m mixed medley
Silver medal – second place	2021 Kazan	4x50 m freestyle
Silver medal – second place	2019 Glasgow	4×50 m mixed medley
Silver medal – second place	2017 Copenhagen	100 m backstroke
Bronze medal – third place	2019 Glasgow	200 m backstroke

Kira Marije Toussaint (born 22 May 1994) is a retired Dutch competitive swimmer who specialises in backstroke. She is the former world record holder in the short course 50 metre backstroke and the Dutch record holder in the long course 50 metre backstroke, and the short course 50 metre, 100 metre, and 200 metre backstroke. She also holds the European record in the long course 50 metre backstroke. At the 2021 FINA Swimming World Cup, Toussaint placed second overall for a competitor of any gender in terms of total points scored and earned 11 gold medals.

== Career ==
=== 2012 European Short Course Championships ===
In the semifinals of the 2012 European Short Course Championships in Chartres, France, she broke the Dutch record in the 100 meter backstroke (short course) with a time of 57.16 s. She finished 4th in the final.

=== 2016 Summer Olympics ===
Toussaint qualified for the 2016 Summer Olympics in Rio de Janeiro in the 100 meter backstroke. Her time of 1:00.25 exactly matched the Olympic Qualifying Time. She finished 18th in the heats and did not advance to the semifinals.

=== 2018–2020 ===
In December 2019, Toussaint was found innocent and that no anti-doping rule violation had occurred following an investigation by FINA of one of her doping test sample results from 2 November 2018. FINA had earlier dropped its accusations against Toussaint in March 2019.

==== International Swimming League ====
In 2019 she was member of the 2019 International Swimming League representing Team Iron. She finished second in both the 50 and the 100 backstroke in London. In 2020 International Swimming League she represented London Roar.

=== 2021 Swimming World Cup ===
Toussaint competed in the 2021 FINA Swimming World Cup, where she earned a total of 11 medals, all of which were gold medals. Her performances across all four stops of the World Cup circuit were dominant enough for her to place second overall in terms of total points scored by a competitor, male or female, for all four stops, a total of 227.4 points, and she earned $103,500 of prize money. FINA ranked the accomplishment of Toussaint winning a gold medal in every backstroke event she raced in the month-long World Cup competition as their number six moment from the competition.

== Personal life ==
Toussaint is the daughter of Jolanda de Rover, the Olympic gold medalist in the 200 meter backstroke at the 1984 Summer Olympics in Los Angeles.

== Personal bests ==
Short course
Event	Time	Date	Location
50 m backstroke	25.60 NR	2020-11-14	Budapest, Hungary
50 m backstroke	25.60 NR	2020-12-18	Amsterdam, Netherlands
100 m backstroke	55.17 =NR	2019-12-04	Glasgow, United Kingdom
200 m backstroke	2:01.26NR	2021-11-04	Kazan, Russia

Long course
Event	Time	Date	Location
50 m backstroke	27.10 NR	2021-04-10	Eindhoven, Netherlands
100 m backstroke	58.65 Former NR	2021-04-11	Eindhoven, Netherlands
200 m backstroke	2:10.02	2021-04-09	Eindhoven, Netherlands

== Awards and honours ==
- FINA, Top 10 Moments: 2021 Swimming World Cup (#6)

Records
Preceded by Etiene Medeiros	Women's 50 metre backstroke world record holder (short course); 14 November 2020 – 20 December 2021	Succeeded by Maggie Mac Neil
