= Silvia Scalia =

Italian swimmer (born 1995)

Personal information
- Nationality: Italian
- Born: 16 July 1995 (age 30) Lecco

Sport
- Country: Italy
- Sport: Swimming
Medal record
Women's swimming
Representing Italy
World Championships (SC)
Silver medal – second place	2016 Windsor	4×50 m medley
European Championships (LC)
Silver medal – second place	2022 Rome	50 m backstroke
Bronze medal – third place	2020 Budapest	4×100 m medley
European Championships (SC)
Silver medal – second place	2019 Glasgow	4×50 m medley
Universiade
Gold medal – first place	2019 Naples	50 m backstroke
Bronze medal – third place	2019 Naples	100 m backstroke
Mediterranean Games
Gold medal – first place	2018 Tarragona	50 m backstroke
Silver medal – second place	2018 Tarragona	100 m backstroke

Silvia Scalia (born 16 July 1995) is an Italian swimmer who won two medals at the 2019 Summer Universiade.

== Biography ==
Scalia won also two medals at the 2018 Mediterranean Games and a medal with the relay team at the Short Course Worlds.

At the 2022 European Aquatics Championships, held in Rome in August, she won the silver medal in the 50 metre backstroke with a time of 27.53 seconds, finishing less than three-tenths of a second behind gold medalist Analia Pigrée of France.

== See also ==
- Italy at the 2019 Summer Universiade
- Italy at the 2018 Mediterranean Games
