= Maaike de Waard =

Dutch swimmer (born 1996)

Personal information
- Nationality: Dutch
- Born: 11 October 1996 (age 29) Vlaardingen, Netherlands
- Height: 1.73 m (5 ft 8 in)
- Weight: 58 kg (128 lb)

Sport
- Sport: Swimming
- Strokes: Backstroke, butterfly, crawl
- Club: PSV
Medal record
Women's swimming
Representing the Netherlands
World Championships (SC)
Silver medal – second place	2016 Windsor	4×50 m freestyle
Silver medal – second place	2016 Windsor	4×50 m mixed freestyle
Silver medal – second place	2018 Hangzhou	4×50 m freestyle
Silver medal – second place	2018 Hangzhou	4×100 m freestyle
Silver medal – second place	2018 Hangzhou	4×50 m mixed medley
Bronze medal – third place	2016 Windsor	4×100 m freestyle
Bronze medal – third place	2018 Hangzhou	4×50 m medley
Bronze medal – third place	2021 Abu Dhabi	4x50 m medley
Bronze medal – third place	2021 Abu Dhabi	4×50 m freestyle
Bronze medal – third place	2022 Melbourne	4×50 m freestyle
Bronze medal – third place	2022 Melbourne	4×50 m mixed freestyle
European Championships (LC)
Silver medal – second place	2026 Paris	4×100 m mixed medley
Bronze medal – third place	2020 Budapest	50 m backstroke
Bronze medal – third place	2022 Rome	50 m butterfly
Bronze medal – third place	2022 Rome	50 m backstroke
Bronze medal – third place	2022 Rome	4×100 m medley
European Championships (SC)
Gold medal – first place	2021 Kazan	4×50 m mixed freestyle
Gold medal – first place	2021 Kazan	4×50 m mixed medley
Gold medal – first place	2025 Lublin	4×50 m freestyle
Gold medal – first place	2025 Lublin	4×50 m medley
Silver medal – second place	2021 Kazan	100 m backstroke
Silver medal – second place	2021 Kazan	50 m butterfly
Silver medal – second place	2021 Kazan	4×50 metre freestyle
Silver medal – second place	2025 Lublin	100 m backstroke
Silver medal – second place	2025 Lublin	4×50 m mixed medley
Bronze medal – third place	2017 Copenhagen	50 m backstroke
Bronze medal – third place	2017 Copenhagen	50 m butterfly
Bronze medal – third place	2021 Kazan	50 m backstroke
Bronze medal – third place	2025 Lublin	50 m backstroke
Youth Olympic Games
Gold medal – first place	2014 Nanjing	50 m backstroke

Maaike de Waard (born 11 October 1996) is a Dutch competitive swimmer who specializes in backstroke and butterfly events. She competed in the women's 50 metre backstroke event at the 2017 World Aquatics Championships.

== Personal bests ==
Short course
Event	Time	Date	Location
50 m freestyle	24.10	2021-11-03	Kazan, Russia
100 m freestyle	53.51	2016-11-06	Hoofddorp, Netherlands
50 m backstroke	25.97	2021-12-19	Abu Dhabi, United Arab Emerates
100 m backstroke	55.86	2021-11-06	Kazan, Russia
50 m butterfly	24.92	2022-12-13	Melbourne, Australia
100 m butterfly	56.40	2022-12-17	Melbourne, Australia

Long course
Event	Time	Date	Location
50 m freestyle	25.38	2017-04-09	Eindhoven, Netherlands
100 m freestyle	55.99	2017-04-09	Eindhoven, Netherlands
50 m backstroke	27.54	2022-08-14	Rome, Italy
100 m backstroke	59.62	2022-04-03	Heidelberg, Germany
50 m butterfly	25.62	2022-08-13	Rome, Italy
100 m butterfly	58.10	2020-12-04	Rotterdam, Netherlands
