= Chinese Taipei at the 2025 World Aquatics Championships =

- Flag of Chinese Taipei
- World Aquatics code: TPE

in Singapore
- Competitors: 14 in 3 sports
- Medals: Gold 0 Silver 0 Bronze 0 Total 0

World Aquatics Championships appearances
- 1973; 1975; 1978; 1982; 1986; 1991; 1994; 1998; 2001; 2003; 2005; 2007; 2009; 2011; 2013; 2015; 2017; 2019; 2022; 2023; 2024; 2025

Chinese Taipei are competing at the 2025 World Aquatics Championships in Singapore from July 11 to August 3, 2025.

== Athletes by discipline ==
The following is the number of competitors who will participate at the Championships per discipline.

Sport	Men	Women	Total
Diving	0	2	2
Open water swimming	3	3	6
Swimming	2	4	6
Total	5	9	14

== Diving ==
Women

Athlete	Event	Preliminaries		Semi-finals		Final	
Athlete	Event	Points	Rank	Points	Rank	Points	Rank
Barbara Chen	1 m springboard	145.75	51	—		Did not advance	
Jacqueline Chen	1 m springboard	174.50	48	—		Did not advance	
Barbara Chen	3 m springboard	205.35	41	Did not advance			
Jacqueline Chen	3 m springboard	212.35	39	Did not advance			
Barbara Chen; Jacqueline Chen	3 m synchronized springboard	203.73	18	—		Did not advance	

== Open water swimming ==
Men

Athlete	Event	Heats		Semifinal		Final	
Athlete	Event	Time	Rank	Time	Rank	Time	Rank
Su Bo-ling	Men's 3 km knockout sprints	17:45.4	15	Did not advance			
Tsao Jun-yan	Men's 3 km knockout sprints	18:13.7	21	Did not advance			
Su Bo-ling	Men's 5 km	—				1:02:42.1	46
Tsao Jun-yan	Men's 5 km	—				1:03:31.5	53
Cho Cheng-chi	Men's 10 km	—				2:03:08.9	16
Su Bo-ling	Men's 10 km	—				2:08:39.5	33

Women

Athlete	Event	Heats		Semifinal		Final	
Athlete	Event	Time	Rank	Time	Rank	Time	Rank
Lin Jia-shien	Women's 3 km knockout sprints	19:14.6	20	Did not advance			
Wang Yi-chen	Women's 3 km knockout sprints	19:33.1	24	Did not advance			
Lin Jia-shien	Women's 5 km	—				1:06:34.2	31
Wang Yi-chen	Women's 5 km	—				1:09:53.0	42
Lin Jia-shien	Women's 10 km	—				2:26:49.1	43
Teng Yu-wen	Women's 10 km	—				2:15:54.2	20

Men

Athlete	Event	Final	
Athlete	Event	Time	Rank
Cho Cheng-chi; Lin Jia-shien; Teng Yu-wen; Tsao Jun-yan	Team relay	1:14:57.0	10

== Swimming ==
Men

Athlete	Event	Heat		Semi-final		Final	
Athlete	Event	Time	Rank	Time	Rank	Time	Rank
Jhang Wei-tang	100 m breaststroke	1:01.86	38	Did not advance			
Wang Hsing-hao	200 m breaststroke	2:15.87	28	Did not advance			
Wang Hsing-hao	200 m individual medley	2:01.90	29	Did not advance			

Women

Athlete	Event	Heat		Semi-final		Final	
Athlete	Event	Time	Rank	Time	Rank	Time	Rank
Chang Ya-jia	50 m backstroke	29.25	32	Did not advance			
Chang Ya-jia	200 m backstroke	2:17.34	32	Did not advance			
Chiu Yi-chen	50 m freestyle	26.12	44	Did not advance			
Chiu Yi-chen	50 m breaststroke	32.60	38	Did not advance			
Chiu Yi-chen	50 m butterfly	27.12	35	Did not advance			
Liu Pei-yin	100 m butterfly	1:00.90	34	Did not advance			
Applejean Gwinn	400 m individual medley	4:51.16	18	—		Did not advance	
