= Chinese Taipei at the 2022 World Aquatics Championships =

- Flag of Chinese Taipei
- FINA code: TPE
- National federation: Chinese Taipei Swimming Association

in Budapest, Hungary
- Competitors: 13 in 3 sports
- Medals: Gold 0 Silver 0 Bronze 0 Total 0

World Aquatics Championships appearances
- 1973; 1975; 1978; 1982; 1986; 1991; 1994; 1998; 2001; 2003; 2005; 2007; 2009; 2011; 2013; 2015; 2017; 2019; 2022; 2023; 2024

Chinese Taipei competed at the 2022 World Aquatics Championships in Budapest, Hungary from 18 June to 3 July.

== Diving ==
Chinese Taipei entered 1 diver.

Women

Athlete	Event	Preliminaries		Semifinals		Final	
Athlete	Event	Points	Rank	Points	Rank	Points	Rank
Lai Yu-yen	1 m springboard	145.70	45	—		did not advance	

== Open water swimming ==
Chinese Taipei entered 4 open water swimmers ( 2 men and 2 women)

Men

Athlete	Event	Time	Rank
Cho Cheng-chi	5 km	56:28.90	24
Cho Cheng-chi	10 km	1:55:54.60	23
Cho Cheng-chi	25 km	5:04:18.70	9
Cho Pei-chi	5 km	59:42.70	39
Cho Pei-chi	10 km	2:05:24.00	50

Women

Athlete	Event	Time	Rank
Teng Yu-wen	10 km	2:10:24.90	39
Wang Yi-chen	10 km	2:19:46.30	52

Mixed

Athlete	Event	Time	Rank
Cho Cheng-chi; Cho Pei-chi; Teng Yu-wen; Wang Yi-chen	Team	1:10:53.2	14

== Swimming ==
Chinese Taipei entered 8 swimmers.

Men

Athlete	Event	Heat		Semifinal		Final	
Athlete	Event	Time	Rank	Time	Rank	Time	Rank
Cai Bing-rong	100 m breaststroke	1:02.75	35	did not advance			
Cai Bing-rong	200 m breaststroke	2:15.46	27	did not advance			
Chuang Mu-lun	50 m backstroke	25.55	23	did not advance			
Chuang Mu-lun	100 m backstroke	55.57	27	did not advance			
Wang Kuan-hung	100 m butterfly	52.80	27	did not advance			
Wang Kuan-hung	200 m butterfly	1:56.87	16 Q	1:56.23	15	did not advance	
Wang Hsing-hao	200 m individual medley	2:02.27	25	did not advance			
Wu Chun-feng	50 m freestyle	23.17	51	did not advance			
Wu Chun-feng	50 m breaststroke	28.34	29	did not advance			
Chuang Mu-lun; Cai Bing-rong; Wang Kuan-hung; Wang Hsing-hao	4 × 100 m medley relay	3:42.21	15	—		did not advance	

Women

Athlete	Event	Heat		Semifinal		Final	
Athlete	Event	Time	Rank	Time	Rank	Time	Rank
Hsu An	50 m backstroke	30.46	26	did not advance			
Hsu An	100 m backstroke	1:05.50	36	did not advance			
Huang Mei-chien	50 m freestyle	26.12	29	did not advance			
Huang Mei-chien	50 m butterfly	27.20	30	did not advance			
Lin Pei-wun	50 m breaststroke	32.80	36	did not advance			
Lin Pei-wun	100 m breaststroke	1:13.09	40	did not advance			

Mixed

Athlete	Event	Heat		Semifinal		Final	
Athlete	Event	Time	Rank	Time	Rank	Time	Rank
Wang Kuan-hung; Wang Hsing-hao; Hsu An; Huang Mei-chien	4 × 100 m freestyle relay	3:34.68 NR	15	—		did not advance	
Chuang Mu-lun; Wang Hsing-hao; Hsu An; Huang Mei-chien	4 × 100 m medley relay	3:58.13 NR	16	—		did not advance	
