= Chinese Taipei at the 2023 World Aquatics Championships =

- Flag of Chinese Taipei
- FINA code: TPE
- National federation: Chinese Taipei Swimming Association
- Website: swimming.org.tw

in Fukuoka, Japan
- Competitors: 10 in 2 sports
- Medals: Gold 0 Silver 0 Bronze 0 Total 0

World Aquatics Championships appearances
- 1973; 1975; 1978; 1982; 1986; 1991; 1994; 1998; 2001; 2003; 2005; 2007; 2009; 2011; 2013; 2015; 2017; 2019; 2022; 2023; 2024

Chinese Taipei is set to compete at the 2023 World Aquatics Championships in Fukuoka, Japan from 14 to 30 July.

== Open water swimming ==
Chinese Taipei entered 2 open water swimmer.

Men

Athlete	Event	Time	Rank
Cho Cheng-chi	Men's 5 km	57:51.6	36
Cho Cheng-chi	Men's 10 km	1:59:19.7	38

Women

Athlete	Event	Time	Rank
Teng Yu-wen	Women's 5 km	1:02:26.5	31
Teng Yu-wen	Women's 10 km	2:11:11.1	41

== Swimming ==
Chinese Taipei entered 8 swimmers.

Men

Athlete	Event	Heat		Semifinal		Final	
Athlete	Event	Time	Rank	Time	Rank	Time	Rank
Chuang Mu-lun	50 metre backstroke	25.50	27	Did not advance			
Chuang Mu-lun	100 metre backstroke	54.95 NR	28	Did not advance			
Fu Kun-ming	400 metre individual medley	DSQ		—		Did not advance	
Wang Hsing-hao	200 metre individual medley	2:00.01	21	Did not advance			
Wang Kuan-hung	200 metre butterfly	1:55.17	4 Q	1:54.97	8 Q	1:55.43	8
Wu Chun-feng	50 metre freestyle	23.52	63	Did not advance			

Women

Athlete	Event	Heat		Semifinal		Final	
Athlete	Event	Time	Rank	Time	Rank	Time	Rank
Huang Mei-chien	50 metre freestyle	25.95	42	Did not advance			
Huang Mei-chien	50 metre butterfly	26.73	27	Did not advance			
Lin Pei-wun	100 metre breaststroke	1:09.72	36	Did not advance			
Wu Yi-en	50 metre backstroke	29.28	36	Did not advance			
