= Chinese Taipei at the 2017 World Aquatics Championships =

- Flag of Chinese Taipei
- FINA code: TPE
- National federation: Chinese Taipei Swimming Association
- Website: www.swimming.org.tw

in Budapest, Hungary
- Competitors: 9 in 1 sport
- Medals: Gold 0 Silver 0 Bronze 0 Total 0

World Aquatics Championships appearances
- 1973; 1975; 1978; 1982; 1986; 1991; 1994; 1998; 2001; 2003; 2005; 2007; 2009; 2011; 2013; 2015; 2017; 2019; 2022; 2023; 2024

Chinese Taipei competed at the 2017 World Aquatics Championships in Budapest, Hungary from 14 July to 30 July.

== Swimming ==
Taiwanese swimmers have achieved qualifying standards in the following events (up to a maximum of 2 swimmers in each event at the A-standard entry time, and 1 at the B-standard):

Men

| Athlete | Event | Heat | | Semifinal | | Final | |
| Athlete | Event | Time | Rank | Time | Rank | Time | Rank |
|---|---|---|---|---|---|---|---|
| An Ting-yao | 200 m freestyle | 1:52.09 | 55 | did not advance | | | |
| An Ting-yao | 400 m freestyle | 3:59.57 | 43 | — | | did not advance | |
| Cho Cheng-chi | 400 m individual medley | 4:25.16 | =28 | — | | did not advance | |
| Chou Wei-liang | 100 m butterfly | 54.31 | 47 | did not advance | | | |
| Chou Wei-liang | 200 m butterfly | 2:01.49 | 35 | did not advance | | | |
| Huang Guo-ting | 1500 m freestyle | 15:31.10 | 31 | — | | did not advance | |
| Lee Hsuan-yen | 100 m breaststroke | DSQ | | did not advance | | | |
| Lee Hsuan-yen | 200 m breaststroke | 2:15.94 | 29 | did not advance | | | |
| Wang Yu-lian | 100 m freestyle | 51.04 | 58 | did not advance | | | |
| Wen Ren-hau | 200 m individual medley | 2:05.85 | 35 | did not advance | | | |
| Wu Chun-feng | 50 m freestyle | 22.53 NR | 30 | did not advance | | | |
| Wu Chun-feng | 50 m breaststroke | 28.75 | 46 | did not advance | | | |

Women

| Athlete | Event | Heat | | Semifinal | | Final | |
| Athlete | Event | Time | Rank | Time | Rank | Time | Rank |
|---|---|---|---|---|---|---|---|
| Chen Szu-chi | 50 m backstroke | 29.42 | 39 | did not advance | | | |
