= Chinese Taipei at the 2024 World Aquatics Championships =

- Flag of Chinese Taipei
- FINA code: TPE
- National federation: Chinese Taipei Swimming Association
- Website: swimming.org.tw

in Doha, Qatar
- Competitors: 10 in 2 sports
- Medals: Gold 0 Silver 0 Bronze 0 Total 0

World Aquatics Championships appearances
- 1973; 1975; 1978; 1982; 1986; 1991; 1994; 1998; 2001; 2003; 2005; 2007; 2009; 2011; 2013; 2015; 2017; 2019; 2022; 2023; 2024

Chinese Taipei competed at the 2024 World Aquatics Championships in Doha, Qatar from 2 to 18 February.

== Competitors ==
The following is the list of competitors in the Championships.

Sport	Men	Women	Total
Open water swimming	2	2	4
Swimming	2	4	6
Total	4	6	10

== Open water swimming ==
Men

Athlete	Event	Time	Rank
Cho Pei-chi	Men's 5 km	57:37.7	60
Cho Pei-chi	Men's 10 km	2:07:35.8	72
Cho Cheng-chi	Men's 5 km	51:48.1	13
Cho Cheng-chi	Men's 10 km	1:49:58.7	28

Women

Athlete	Event	Time	Rank
Teng Yu-wen	Women's 5 km	1:01:22.9	42
Teng Yu-wen	Women's 10 km	2:07:28.6	47
Wang Yi-chen	Women's 5 km	1:04:53.7	46
Wang Yi-chen	Women's 10 km	2:15:32.6	55

Mixed

Athlete	Event	Time	Rank
Cho Pei-chi; Cho Cheng-chi; Teng Yu-wen; Wang Yi-chen	Team relay	1:09:37.3	17

== Swimming ==
Chinese Taipei entered 6 swimmers.

Men

Athlete	Event	Heat		Semifinal		Final	
Athlete	Event	Time	Rank	Time	Rank	Time	Rank
Wang Hsing-hao	200 metre individual medley	2:03.85	24	Did not advance			
Wang Hsing-hao	400 metre individual medley	4:39.53	21	—		Did not advance	
Wu Chun-feng	50 metre breaststroke	28.86	40	Did not advance			

Women

Athlete	Event	Heat		Semifinal		Final	
Athlete	Event	Time	Rank	Time	Rank	Time	Rank
Gwinn Applejean	400 metre individual medley	5:00.08	20	—		Did not advance	
Huang Mei-chien	50 metre freestyle	25.68	30	Did not advance			
Huang Mei-chien	50 metre butterfly	27.07	26	Did not advance			
Lin Pei-wun	50 metre breaststroke	32.10	27	Did not advance			
Lin Pei-wun	100 metre breaststroke	1:10.77	32	Did not advance			
Wu Yi-en	50 metre backstroke	31.11	43	Did not advance			
Huang Mei-chien; Wu Yi-en; Lin Pei-wun; Applejean Gwinn	4 × 100 m freestyle relay	3:59.38	13	—		Did not advance	
Huang Mei-chien; Wu Yi-en; Lin Pei-wun; Applejean Gwinn	4 × 100 m medley relay	4:21.94	19	—		Did not advance	
