= Swimming at the 2024 World Aquatics Championships – Women's 4 × 100 metre medley relay =

Women's 4 × 100 metre medley relay at the Swimming at the 2024 World Aquatics Championships
- Venue: Aspire Dome
- Location: Doha, Qatar
- Dates: 18 February (heats and final)
- Competitors: 80 from 20 nations
- Teams: 20
- Winning time: 3:55.98

Medalists
gold medal	Iona Anderson; Abbey Harkin; Brianna Throssell; Shayna Jack; Jaclyn Barclay; Alexandria Perkins	Australia
silver medal	Louise Hansson; Sophie Hansson; Sarah Sjöström; Michelle Coleman; Hanna Rosvall	Sweden
bronze medal	Ingrid Wilm; Sophie Angus; Rebecca Smith; Taylor Ruck; Sydney Pickrem; Katerine Savard	Canada

The Women's 4 × 100 metre medley relay competition at the 2024 World Aquatics Championships was held on 18 February 2024.

== Records ==
Prior to the competition, the existing world and championship records were as follows.

World record	United States	3:50.40	Gwangju, South Korea	28 July 2019
Competition record	United States	3:50.40	Gwangju, South Korea	28 July 2019

== Results ==
=== Heats ===
The heats were held at 10:25.

Rank	Heat	Lane	Nation	Swimmers	Time	Notes
1	3	5	Canada	Ingrid Wilm (59.77); Sydney Pickrem (1:06.14); Rebecca Smith (57.81); Katerine Savard (54.91)	3:58.63	Q
2	3	3	Sweden	Hanna Rosvall (1:01.23); Sophie Hansson (1:07.23); Louise Hansson (56.84); Michelle Coleman (54.05)	3:59.35	Q
3	2	4	Australia	Jaclyn Barclay (1:00.27); Abbey Harkin (1:08.15); Alexandria Perkins (57.21); Brianna Throssell (54.46)	4:00.09	Q
4	2	3	Netherlands	Kira Toussaint (1:00.82); Tes Schouten (1:08.36); Maaike de Waard (58.03); Kim Busch (54.88)	4:02.09	Q
5	2	5	China	Sun Mingxia (1:02.13); Yang Chang (1:06.50); Yu Yiting (57.84); Ai Yanhan (55.75)	4:02.22	Q
6	3	7	Hong Kong	Stephanie Au (1:00.98); Siobhan Haughey (1:07.05); Natalie Kan (59.29); Camille Cheng (55.02)	4:02.34	Q
7	3	2	Italy	Francesca Pasquino (1:01.37); Arianna Castiglioni (1:06.75); Costanza Cocconcelli (58.35); Chiara Tarantino (56.15)	4:02.62	Q
8	2	6	Poland	Adela Piskorska (1:01.16); Dominika Sztandera (1:07.76); Paulina Peda (58.42); Kornelia Fiedkiewicz (55.29)	4:02.63	Q
9	3	8	Singapore	Levenia Sim (1:02.58); Letitia Sim (1:06.41); Quah Jing Wen (58.89); Quah Ting Wen (55.00)	4:02.88	NR
10	3	1	South Africa	Milla Drakopoulos (1:02.48); Lara van Niekerk (1:07.50); Erin Gallagher (57.99); Emma Chelius (55.57)	4:03.54	
11	2	2	Spain	Carmen Weiler (1:01.31); Jimena Ruiz (1:08.67); Paula Juste (59.09); María Daza (54.94)	4:04.01	
11	2	7	Greece	Theodora Drakou (1:01.47); Eleni Kontogeorgou (1:09.01); Anna Ntountounaki (57.79); Maria Thaleia Drasidou (55.74)	4:04.01	NR
13	1	4	Hungary	Lora Komoróczy (1:01.83); Eszter Békési (1:09.43); Panna Ugrai (58.93); Petra Senánszky (55.06)	4:05.25	
14	2	8	Portugal	Camila Rebelo (1:01.13); Ana Rodrigues (1:08.89); Mariana Pacheco (59.00); Francisca Soares (56.24)	4:05.26	
15	1	3	Slovenia	Janja Šegel (1:02.02); Tara Vovk (1:10.49); Hana Sekuti (1:00.40); Neža Klančar (54.56)	4:07.47	NR
16	2	1	Mexico	Tayde Sansores (1:03.13); Melissa Rodríguez (1:08.35); María José Mata Cocco (1:00.53); Tayde Revilak (56.29)	4:08.30	
17	3	0	Philippines	Teia Salvino (1:03.76); Thanya Dela Cruz (1:10.13); Jasmine Alkhaldi (1:02.78); Kayla Sanchez (55.28)	4:11.95	
18	2	0	Kazakhstan	Xeniya Ignatova (1:02.04); Adelaida Pchelintseva (1:11.98); Sofia Spodarenko (1:00.32); Diana Taszhanova (59.58)	4:13.92	
19	3	9	Chinese Taipei	Wu Yi-en (1:07.47); Lin Pei-wun (1:11.36); Applejean Gwinn (1:06.13); Huang Mei-chien (56.98)	4:21.94	
	1	5	Slovakia	Did not start		
	2	9	Lithuania	Did not start		
	3	4	United States	Did not start		
	3	6	South Korea	Song Jae-yun (1:02.11); Moon Su-a (1:10.21); Kim Seo-yeong (58.11); Hur Yeon-kyung	Disqualified	

=== Final ===
The final was held at 20:55.

Rank	Lane	Nation	Swimmers	Time	Notes
1st place, gold medalist(s)	3	Australia	Iona Anderson (59.20); Abbey Harkin (1:07.21); Brianna Throssell (56.86); Shayna Jack (52.71)	3:55.98	
2nd place, silver medalist(s)	5	Sweden	Louise Hansson (59.93); Sophie Hansson (1:06.18); Sarah Sjöström (56.11); Michelle Coleman (54.13)	3:56.35	
3rd place, bronze medalist(s)	4	Canada	Ingrid Wilm (58.95); Sophie Angus (1:06.24); Rebecca Smith (58.28); Taylor Ruck (52.96)	3:56.43	
4	2	China	Sun Mingxia (1:02.20); Tang Qianting (1:05.15); Yu Yiting (57.16); Ai Yanhan (54.65)	3:59.16	
5	6	Netherlands	Kira Toussaint (1:00.26); Tes Schouten (1:07.53); Maaike de Waard (58.16); Kim Busch (54.29)	4:00.24	
6	1	Italy	Francesca Pasquino (1:01.03); Benedetta Pilato (1:06.56); Costanza Cocconcelli (58.12); Chiara Tarantino (54.63)	4:00.34	
7	8	Poland	Adela Piskorska (1:01.24); Dominika Sztandera (1:07.46); Paulina Peda (58.49); Kornelia Fiedkiewicz (54.54)	4:01.73	
8	7	Hong Kong	Stephanie Au (1:01.29); Siobhan Haughey (1:06.82); Natalie Kan (59.95); Camille Cheng (55.09)	4:03.15	
