= List of Taiwanese records in swimming =

The Taiwanese records in swimming are the fastest ever performances of swimmers from Republic of China (Taiwan, ROC), competing as Chinese Taipei, which are recognised and ratified by the Chinese Taipei Swimming Association.

Records are recognized for males and females in the following long course (50m) and short course (25m) events:

- freestyle: 50, 100, 200, 400, 800 and 1500;
- backstroke: 50, 100 and 200;
- breaststroke: 50, 100 and 200;
- butterfly: 50, 100 and 200;
- individual medley (I.M.): 100 (25m only), 200 and 400;
- relays: 4x50 free (25m only), 4x100 free, 4x200 free, 4x50 medley, and 4 × 100 medley.

All records were set in finals unless noted otherwise.

== Long Course (50 m) ==
=== Men ===
Event	Time		Name	Club	Date	Meet	Location	Ref
50 m freestyle	22.21	=	Wu Chun-feng	Chinese Taipei	2 June 2019	Japan Open	Tokyo, Japan	
50 m freestyle	22.21	h, =	Wu Chun-feng	Chinese Taipei	26 July 2019	World Championships	Gwangju, South Korea	
100 m freestyle	49.52	r	Wang Kuan-hung	National Taiwan Normal University	12 May 2021	National Intercollegiate Athletic Games	Tainan, Taiwan	
200 m freestyle	1:48.10		An Ting-yao	Kaohsiung	23 October 2017	National Games	Taipei, Taiwan	
400 m freestyle	3:51.57		Wang Hsing-hao	Taichung	23 October 2019	National Games	Taipei, Taiwan	
800 m freestyle	8:01.07		Wang Kuan-hung	Taipei	16 October 2021	National Games	Taipei, Taiwan	
1500 m freestyle	15:21.73		Huang Guo-ting	National Dong Hwa University	12 May 2021	National Intercollegiate Athletic Games	Tainan, Taiwan	
50 m backstroke	25.12		Chuang Mu-lun	Chinese Taipei	21 September 2026	Asian Games	Tokyo, Japan	
100 m backstroke	54.45		Chuang Mu-lun	Chinese Taipei	1 October 2025	Asian Championships	Ahmedabad, India	
200 m backstroke	2:01.43		Chuang Mu-lun	Kaohsiung	23 October 2019	National Games	Taipei, Taiwan	
50m breaststroke	27.84		Wu Chun-feng	National Taiwan Normal University	10 May 2021	National Intercollegiate Athletic Games	Tainan, Taiwan	
100m breaststroke	1:00.57		Chang Chiao-i	Chinese Taipei	21 September 2026	Asian Games	Tokyo, Japan	
200m breaststroke	2:11.09		Chang Chiao-i	Chinese Taipei	24 September 2026	Asian Games	Tokyo, Japan	
50m butterfly	24.00		Wang Kuan-hung	National Taiwan Normal University	6 May 2026	National Intercollegiate Athletic Games	Taipei, Taiwan	
100m butterfly	51.90		Wang Kuan-hung	National Taiwan Normal University	2 May 2026	National Intercollegiate Athletic Games	Taipei, Taiwan	
200m butterfly	1:54.44	h	Wang Kuan-hung	Chinese Taipei	26 July 2021	Olympic Games	Tokyo, Japan	
200m individual medley	1:59.27	h	Wang Hsing-hao	Chinese Taipei	21 June 2024	Spanish Championships	Palma de Mallorca, Spain	
400m individual medley	4:15.86		Wang Hsing-hao	Chinese Taipei	11 August 2018	Hong Kong Open Championships	Hong Kong, Hong Kong	
4×100m freestyle relay	3:19.02		Lin Chien-liang (49.85); Huang Yen-hsin (50.24); An Ting-yao (49.18); Wang Yu-lian (49.75)	Chinese Taipei	22 August 2018	Asian Games	Jakarta, Indonesia	
4×200m freestyle relay	7:23.22		An Ting-yao (1:50.27); Wang Yu-lian (1:51.65); Huang Yen-hsin (1:50.74); Wang Hsing-hao (1:50.56)	Chinese Taipei	25 August 2017	Universiade	Taipei, Taiwan	
4×100m medley relay	3:38.35		Chuang Mu-lun (55.00); Cai Bing-rong (1:01.49); Wang Kuan-hung (51.80); Wang Hsing-hao (50.06)	Chinese Taipei	26 September 2023	Asian Games	Hangzhou, China	

Legend: # – Record awaiting ratification by Chinese Taipei Swimming Association; WR – World record; AS – Asian record; e – equalled existing record;
Records not set in finals: h – heat; sf – semifinal; r – relay 1st leg; rh – relay heat 1st leg; b – B final; † – en route to final mark; so – swim-off; tt – time trial

=== Women ===
Event	Time		Name	Club	Date	Meet	Location	Ref
50 m freestyle	25.34		Han An-chi	Taipei	21 October 2025	National Games	Taichung, Taiwan	
100 m freestyle	55.26	sf	Han An-chi	Chinese Taipei	18 July 2025	World University Games	Berlin, Germany	
200 m freestyle	1:59.93		Tsai Shu-min	Chinese Taipei	13 January 1998	World Championships	Perth, Australia	
400 m freestyle	4:12.94	b	Tsai Shu-min	Chinese Taipei	14 January 1998	World Championships	Perth, Australia	
800 m freestyle	8:40.31		Lin Chi-chan	Chinese Taipei	25 July 1996	Olympic Games	Atlanta, United States	
1500 m freestyle	16:41.08		Lin Chi-chan	-	6 June 1996	Taiwanese Age Group Championships	Kaohsiung, Taiwan	
50m backstroke	28.50		Chang Ya-jia	-	19 April 2026	National Middle School Athletic Games	Kaohsiung, Taiwan	
100m backstroke	1:00.95		Chang Ya-jia	-	18 April 2026	National Middle School Athletic Games	Kaohsiung, Taiwan	
200m backstroke	2:11.96	h	Han An-chi	Chinese Taipei	17 July 2025	World University Games	Berlin, Germany	
50m breaststroke	31.19	h	Lin Pei-wun	National Taiwan University of Sport	5 May 2023	National Intercollegiate Athletic Games	Hsinchu, Taiwan	
100m breaststroke	1:08.48		Lin Pei-wun	National Taiwan University of Sport	7 May 2023	National Intercollegiate Athletic Games	Hsinchu, Taiwan	
200m breaststroke	2:29.19		Cheng Wan-jung	Taipei City	18 October 2015	National Games	Kaohsiung, Taiwan	
50m butterfly	26.68		Huang Mei-chien	National Taiwan University	1 May 2019	National Intercollegiate Athletic Games	Taoyuan, Taiwan	
100m butterfly	57.98		Han An-chi	National Sports Training Center	12 June 2026	National Zhong Cheng Cup	Taipei, Taiwan	
200m butterfly	2:09.25		Han An-chi	National Sports Training Center	13 June 2026	National Zhong Cheng Cup	Taipei, Taiwan	
200m individual medley	2:11.72		Han An-chi	National Sports Training Center	15 June 2026	National Zhong Cheng Cup	Taipei, Taiwan	
400m individual medley	4:40.21		Cheng Wan-jung	Chinese Taipei	10 December 2009	East Asian Games	Kowloon, Hong Kong	
4×100m freestyle relay	3:46.77		Liu Pei-yin (56.81); Liao Yu-fei (56.61); Chiu Yi-chen (58.08); Han An-chi (55.27)	Chinese Taipei	17 July 2025	World University Games	Berlin, Germany	
4×200 m freestyle relay	8:18.92		Chiang Tzu-ying; Lin Chi-chan; Kuang Chia-hsien; Tsai Shu-min	Chinese Taipei	7 December 1998	Asian Games	Bangkok, Thailand	
4×100m medley relay	4:04.86		Chang Ya-jia (1:01.56); Lin Pei-wun (1:08.31); Han An-chi (59.19); Liu Pei-yin (55.80)	Chinese Taipei	25 September 2026	Asian Games	Tokyo, Japan	

Legend: # – Record awaiting ratification by Chinese Taipei Swimming Association; WR – World record; AS – Asian record; e – equalled existing record;
Records not set in finals: h – heat; sf – semifinal; r – relay 1st leg; rh – relay heat 1st leg; b – B final; † – en route to final mark; so – swim-off; tt – time trial

=== Mixed relay ===
Event	Time		Name	Club	Date	Meet	Location	Ref
4×100 m freestyle relay	3:34.68	h	Wang Kuan-hung (50.49); Wang Hsing-hao (50.08); Hsu An (57.08); Huang Mei-chien (57.03)	Chinese Taipei	24 June 2022	World Championships	Budapest, Hungary	
4×100 m medley relay	3:53.90		Han An-chi (1:02.46); Jhang Wei-tang (1:01.37); Wang Kuan-hung (54.12); Liu Pei-yin (55.95)	Taipei	22 October 2025	National Games	Taichung, Taiwan	

Legend: # – Record awaiting ratification by Chinese Taipei Swimming Association; WR – World record; AS – Asian record; e – equalled existing record;
Records not set in finals: h – heat; so – swim-off

== Short Course (25 m) ==
=== Men ===
Event	Time		Name	Club	Date	Meet	Location	Ref
50m freestyle	21.92		Wu Chun-feng	National Sports Training Center	14 December 2020	Taiwanese Winter Championships	Minxiong, Taiwan	
100m freestyle	48.33	rh	Wang Kuan-hung	Chinese Taipei	13 December 2022	World Championships	Melbourne, Australia	
200m freestyle	1:44.73		An Ting-yao	Chinese Taipei	24 September 2017	Asian Indoor and Martial Arts Games	Ashgabat, Turkmenistan	
400m freestyle	3:42.08		Wang Kuan-hung	Cali Condors	15 November 2020	International Swimming League	Budapest, Hungary	
800m freestyle	7:56.29	†	Cho Cheng-Chi	Chinese Taipei	1 October 2016	World Cup	Beijing, China	
1500m freestyle	14:57.70		Cho Cheng-Chi	Chinese Taipei	1 October 2016	World Cup	Beijing, China	
50m backstroke	23.93		Chuang Mu-lun	University of Taipei	9 November 2024	Taiwanese Winter Championships	Kaohsiung, Taiwan	
100m backstroke	52.17		Chuang Mu-lun	University of Taipei	8 November 2024	Taiwanese Winter Championships	Kaohsiung, Taiwan	
200m backstroke	1:56.05	h	Chuang Mu-lun	Chinese Taipei	15 November 2018	World Cup	Singapore, Singapore	
50m breaststroke	26.67		Wu Chun-feng	Chinese Taipei	17 December 2022	World Championships	Melbourne, Australia	
100m breaststroke	59.14		Wu Chun-feng	National Sports Training Center	12 December 2020	Taiwanese Winter Championships	Minxiong, Taiwan	
200m breaststroke	2:07.75	h	Tsai Ruei-hong	Chinese Taipei	13 December 2024	World Championships	Budapest, Hungary	
50m butterfly	23.53	†	Wang Kuan-hung	Cali Condors	26 October 2020	International Swimming League	Budapest, Hungary	
100m butterfly	50.60		Wang Kuan-hung	Chinese Taipei	28 October 2022	World Cup	Toronto, Canada	
200m butterfly	1:49.89		Wang Kuan-hung	Cali Condors	16 November 2020	International Swimming League	Budapest, Hungary	
100m individual medley	53.69		Wang Hsing-hao	National Sports Training Center	13 December 2020	Taiwanese Winter Championships	Minxiong, Taiwan	
200m individual medley	1:56.29		Wang Hsing-hao	Chinese Taipei	16 November 2018	World Cup	Singapore, Singapore	
400m individual medley	4:09.36	h	Fu Kun-ming	Chinese Taipei	14 December 2024	World Championships	Budapest, Hungary	
4×50m freestyle relay	1:28.08		Lin Chien-liang (22.04); Chang Kuo-chi (21.92); An Ting-yao (22.40); Wang Yu-lian (21.72)	Chinese Taipei	24 September 2017	Asian Indoor and Martial Arts Games	Ashgabat, Turkmenistan	
4×100m freestyle relay	3:14.60		An Ting-yao (48.69); Lin Chien-liang (48.34); Chang Kuo-chi (49.37); Wang Yu-lian (48.20)	Chinese Taipei	23 September 2017	Asian Indoor and Martial Arts Games	Ashgabat, Turkmenistan	
4×200m freestyle relay	7:10.02	h	Wang Hsing-hao (1:45.96); Wang Kuan-hung (1:46.95); Huang Yen-hsin (1:48.94); An Ting-yao (1:48.17)	Chinese Taipei	14 December 2018	World Championships	Hangzhou, China	
4×50m medley relay	1:37.71	h	Chuang Mu-lun (24.86); Wu Chun-feng (26.48); Wang Kuan-hung (24.37); Lin Chien-liang (22.00)	Chinese Taipei	15 December 2018	World Championships	Hangzhou, China	
4×100m medley relay	3:36.03	h	Chuang Mu-lun (54.06); Cai Bing-rong (59.55); Wang Kuan-hung (53.30); Lin Chien-liang (49.12)	Chinese Taipei	16 December 2018	World Championships	Hangzhou, China	

Legend: # – Record awaiting ratification by Chinese Taipei Swimming Association; WR – World record; AS – Asian record; e – equalled existing record;
Records not set in finals: h – heat; sf – semifinal; r – relay 1st leg; rh – relay heat 1st leg; b – B final; † – en route to final mark; so – swim-off; tt – time trial

=== Women ===
Event	Time		Name	Club	Date	Meet	Location	Ref
50 m freestyle	24.85		Chiu Yi-chen	University of Taipei	10 November 2024	Taiwanese Winter Championships	Kaohsiung, Taiwan	
100 m freestyle	54.89		Yang Chin-kuei	Chinese Taipei	3 July 2013	Asian Indoor and Martial Arts Games	Incheon, South Korea	
200 m freestyle	1:57.47		Yang Chin-kuei	Chinese Taipei	21 February 2009	Japan Open	Tokyo, Japan	
400 m freestyle	4:07.58		Yang Chin-kuei	Chinese Taipei	22 February 2009	Japan Open	Tokyo, Japan	
800 m freestyle	8:30.35		Lin Chi-chan	Chinese Taipei	8 January 1997	World Cup	Beijing, China	
1500 m freestyle	16:57.32		Guo Ruian	Xinxing Penglai	13 December 2018	Taiwanese Winter Championships	Chiayi, Taiwan	
50m backstroke	27.68	=	Lee Ru-yi	Water Star Swimming Training	12 December 2020	Taiwanese Winter Championships	Minxiong, Taiwan	
50m backstroke	27.68	=	Lee Pei-Hsuan	Buda	21 November 2026	Taiwanese Winter Championships	Kaohsiung, Taiwan	
100m backstroke	1:00.24		Lin Zhi-yan	New Taipei Municipal Hsinchuang Senior High School	20 November 2026	Taiwanese Winter Championships	Kaohsiung, Taiwan	
200m backstroke	2:12.34		Hsu An	-	21 December 2014	Taiwanese Winter Championships	Kaohsiung, Taiwan	
50m breaststroke	30.62	h	Lin Pei-wun	Chinese Taipei	14 December 2024	World Championships	Budapest, Hungary	
100m breaststroke	1:06.43	h	Lin Pei-wun	Chinese Taipei	11 December 2024	World Championships	Budapest, Hungary	
200m breaststroke	2:24.82		Lin Pei-wun	Chinese Taipei	11 March 2018	Hong Kong Age Group Championships	Hong Kong, Hong Kong	
50m butterfly	26.47	h	Huang Mei-chien	Chinese Taipei	13 December 2022	World Championships	Melbourne, Australia	
100m butterfly	58.77		Cheng Wan-jung	-	21 December 2009	Taiwanese Winter Championships	Kaohsiung, Taiwan	
200m butterfly	2:08.25		Cheng Wan-jung	-	18 December 2009	Taiwanese Winter Championships	Kaohsiung, Taiwan	
100m individual medley	1:01.43		Cheng Wan-jung	-	18 December 2009	Taiwanese Winter Championships	Kaohsiung, Taiwan	
200m individual medley	2:11.70		Cheng Wan-jung	-	19 December 2009	Taiwanese Winter Championships	Kaohsiung, Taiwan	
400m individual medley	4:36.28		Applejean Gwinn	Chinese Taipei	1 November 2024	World Cup	Singapore, Singapore	
4×50m freestyle relay	1:45.26	h	Huang Mei-chien (25.77); Chen Szu-an (26.56); Wang Wan-chen (26.48); Lin Pei-wun (26.45)	Chinese Taipei	16 December 2018	World Championships	Hangzhou, China	
4×100m freestyle relay	3:50.45	h	Chen Szu-an (57.04); Huang Mei-chien (58.05); Wang Wan-chen (57.69); Lin Pei-wun (57.67)	Chinese Taipei	11 December 2018	World Championships	Hangzhou, China	
4×200m freestyle relay	8:25.00	h	Chen Wan-jung (2:06.58); Chen I-chuan (2:10.36); Chen Ting (2:04.40); Ting Sheng-yo (2:03.66)	Chinese Taipei	15 December 2010	World Championships	Dubai, United Arab Emirates	
4×50m medley relay	1:55.75		Teng Yu-chieh (30.52); Chen I-chuan; Yu Yi-chen; Yang Chin-kuei	Chinese Taipei	30 June 2013	Asian Indoor and Martial Arts Games	Incheon, South Korea	
4×100m medley relay	4:09.38	h	Chen Ting (1:01.77); Chen I-chuan (1:09.90); Chen Wan-jung (59.50); Ting Shen-yo (58.21)	Chinese Taipei	17 December 2010	World Championships	Dubai, United Arab Emirates	

Legend: # – Record awaiting ratification by Chinese Taipei Swimming Association; WR – World record; AS – Asian record; e – equalled existing record;
Records not set in finals: h – heat; sf – semifinal; r – relay 1st leg; rh – relay heat 1st leg; b – B final; † – en route to final mark; so – swim-off; tt – time trial

=== Mixed relay ===
Event	Time		Name	Club	Date	Meet	Location	Ref
4×50 m freestyle relay	1:34.86	h	Wu Chun-feng (22.09); Lin Chien-liang (22.11); Huang Mei-chien (25.16); Lin Pei-wun (25.50)	Chinese Taipei	12 December 2018	World Championships	Hangzhou, China	
4×50 m medley relay	1:43.07	h	Chuang Mu-lun (24.74); Wu Chun-feng (26.64); Huang Mei-chien (26.31); Lin Pei-wun (25.38)	Chinese Taipei	13 December 2018	World Championships	Hangzhou, China	

Legend: # – Record awaiting ratification by Chinese Taipei Swimming Association; WR – World record; AS – Asian record; e – equalled existing record;
Records not set in finals: h – heat; so – swim-off
