= Chinese Taipei at the 2019 World Aquatics Championships =

Chinese Taipei at the 2017 World Aquatics Championships
- Flag of Chinese Taipei
- FINA code: TPE
- National federation: Chinese Taipei Swimming Association
- Website: www.swimming.org.tw

World Aquatics Championships appearances
- 1973; 1975; 1978; 1982; 1986; 1991; 1994; 1998; 2001; 2003; 2005; 2007; 2009; 2011; 2013; 2015; 2017; 2019; 2022; 2023; 2024

Chinese Taipei competed at the 2019 World Aquatics Championships in Gwangju, South Korea from 12 to 28 July.

== Swimming ==
Chinese Taipei entered 14 swimmers.

Men

Athlete	Event	Heat		Semifinal		Final	
Athlete	Event	Time	Rank	Time	Rank	Time	Rank
An Ting-yao	200 m freestyle	1:50.48	40	did not advance			
Cai Bing-rong	200 m breaststroke	2:15.18	37	did not advance			
Chen Chih-ming	100 m breaststroke	1:02.18	42	did not advance			
Chu Chen-ping	100 m butterfly	53.58	32	did not advance			
Chuang Mu-lun	50 m backstroke	25.99	40	did not advance			
Chuang Mu-lun	100 m backstroke	56.01	41	did not advance			
Chuang Mu-lun	200 m backstroke	2:03.73	35	did not advance			
Huang Guo-ting	800 m freestyle	8:08.76	27	—		did not advance	
Huang Guo-ting	1500 m freestyle	15:33.53	29	—		did not advance	
Lin Chien-liang	100 m freestyle	51.65	=67	did not advance			
Lin Chien-liang	50 m butterfly	24.96	53	did not advance			
Wang Hsing-hao	200 m individual medley	2:01.54	24	did not advance			
Wang Hsing-hao	400 m individual medley	4:21.65	20	—		did not advance	
Wang Kuan-hung	200 m butterfly	1:57.21	19	did not advance			
Wu Chun-feng	50 m freestyle	22.21; SO: 22.24	17	did not advance			
Wu Chun-feng	50 m breaststroke	28.43	41	did not advance			
Wang Hsing-hao; Wang Yu-lian; Lin Chien-liang; An Ting-yao	4 × 100 m freestyle relay	3:21.81	23	—		did not advance	
Wang Hao; Wang Kuan-hung; An Ting-yao; Wang Hsing-hao	4 × 200 m freestyle relay	7:23.78	22	—		did not advance	
Chuang Mu-lun; Chen Chih-ming; Chu Chen-ping; Wang Yu-lian	4 × 100 m medley relay	3:40.86 NR	25	—		did not advance	

Women

Athlete	Event	Heat		Semifinal		Final	
Athlete	Event	Time	Rank	Time	Rank	Time	Rank
Huang Mei-chien	50 m butterfly	26.89	=25	did not advance			
Lin Pei-wun	50 m breaststroke	32.37	=34	did not advance			
Lin Pei-wun	100 m breaststroke	1:10.74	36	did not advance			

Mixed

Athlete	Event	Heat		Final	
Athlete	Event	Time	Rank	Time	Rank
Wang Yu-lian; An Ting-yao; Huang Mei-chien; Lin Pei-wun	4 × 100 m freestyle relay	3:41.10	21	did not advance	
Chuang Mu-lun; Lin Pei-wun; Chu Chen-ping; Huang Mei-chien	4 × 100 m medley relay	3:59.13	24	did not advance	
