= Swimming at the 2024 World Aquatics Championships – Women's 4 × 100 metre freestyle relay =

Women's 4 × 100 metre freestyle relay at the 2024 World Aquatics Championships
- Venue: Aspire Dome
- Location: Doha, Qatar
- Dates: 11 February (heats and final)
- Competitors: 60 from 14 nations
- Teams: 14
- Winning time: 3:36.61

Medalists
gold medal	Kim Busch; Janna van Kooten; Kira Toussaint; Marrit Steenbergen; Milou van Wijk	Netherlands
silver medal	Brianna Throssell; Alexandria Perkins; Abbey Harkin; Shayna Jack; Jaclyn Barclay	Australia
bronze medal	Rebecca Smith; Sarah Fournier; Katerine Savard; Taylor Ruck; Ella Jansen	Canada

The Women's 4 × 100 metre freestyle relay competition at the 2024 World Aquatics Championships was held on 11 February 2024.

== Records ==
Prior to the competition, the existing world and championship records were as follows.

World record	Australia	3:27.96	Fukuoka, Japan	23 July 2023
Competition record	Australia	3:27.96	Fukuoka, Japan	23 July 2023

== Results ==
=== Heats ===
The heats were started on 11 February at 11:32.

Rank	Heat	Lane	Nation	Swimmers	Time	Notes
1	2	4	Australia	Alexandria Perkins (55.06); Jaclyn Barclay (55.51); Abbey Harkin (54.93); Shayna Jack (52.83)	3:38.33	Q
2	2	3	Italy	Sofia Morini (55.02); Costanza Cocconcelli (55.18); Emma Virginia Menicucci (55.12); Chiara Tarantino (53.88)	3:39.20	Q
3	1	5	Canada	Rebecca Smith (54.88); Sarah Fournier (55.12); Ella Jansen (55.67); Taylor Ruck (54.08)	3:39.75	Q
4	2	5	Netherlands	Kim Busch (55.63); Milou van Wijk (55.64); Janna van Kooten (54.74); Kira Toussaint (54.41)	3:40.42	Q
5	2	7	Poland	Zuzanna Famulok (55.68); Julia Maik (55.39); Aleksandra Polańska (55.73); Kornelia Fiedkiewicz (54.63)	3:41.43	Q
6	1	3	Brazil	Ana Carolina Vieira (55.60); Stephanie Balduccini (54.47); Maria Fernanda Costa (55.48); Aline Rodrigues (56.12)	3:41.67	Q
7	1	4	China	Lyu Yue (55.48); Ma Yonghui (56.02); Gong Zhenqi (56.06); Ai Yanhan (54.19)	3:41.75	Q
8	2	1	Slovenia	Neža Klančar (55.36); Janja Šegel (54.43); Katja Fain (55.94); Hana Sekuti (56.38)	3:42.11	Q
9	2	6	Hong Kong	Tam Hoi Lam (55.53); Camille Cheng (55.22); Stephanie Au (56.74); Li Sum Yiu (54.98)	3:42.47	
10	1	6	Ireland	Erin Riordan (56.15); Grace Davison (55.81); Maria Godden (57.06); Victoria Catterson (54.93)	3:43.95	
11	2	2	Lithuania	Rūta Meilutytė (56.07); Sylvia Statkevicius (56.27); Patricija Geriksonaitė (57.32); Smilte Plytnykaitė (55.33)	3:44.99	
12	1	2	Philippines	Kayla Sanchez (55.04); Jasmine Alkhaldi (57.51); Xiandi Chua (57.48); Teia Salvino (56.90)	3:46.93	
13	1	7	Serbia	Katarina Milutinović (55.61); Nina Stanisavljević (55.83); Jana Marković (57.19); Martina Bukvić (58.49)	3:47.12	
14	1	1	Chinese Taipei	Huang Mei-chien (57.39); Wu Yi-en (1:02.92); Lin Pei-wun (1:00.65); Applejean Gwinn (58.42)	3:59.38	

=== Final ===
The final was started at 20:21.

Rank	Lane	Nation	Swimmers	Time	Notes
1st place, gold medalist(s)	6	Netherlands	Kim Busch (55.21); Janna van Kooten (55.24); Kira Toussaint (53.81); Marrit Steenbergen (52.35)	3:36.61	
2nd place, silver medalist(s)	4	Australia	Brianna Throssell (54.29); Alexandria Perkins (55.02); Abbey Harkin (54.98); Shayna Jack (52.64)	3:36.93	
3rd place, bronze medalist(s)	3	Canada	Rebecca Smith (54.93); Sarah Fournier (55.28); Katerine Savard (54.48); Taylor Ruck (53.26)	3:37.95	
4	2	Poland	Katarzyna Wasick (54.12) NR; Kornelia Fiedkiewicz (54.23); Zuzanna Famulok (55.04); Julia Maik (55.26)	3:38.65	NR
5	5	Italy	Chiara Tarantino (54.60); Sofia Morini (54.49); Emma Virginia Menicucci (54.95); Costanza Cocconcelli (54.63)	3:38.67	
6	7	Brazil	Ana Carolina Vieira (55.29); Stephanie Balduccini (54.35); Maria Fernanda Costa (55.46); Aline Rodrigues (55.46)	3:40.56	
7	1	China	Ai Yanhan (54.68); Ma Yonghui (55.67); Gong Zhenqi (55.71); Lyu Yue (55.05)	3:41.11	
8	8	Slovenia	Neža Klančar (55.15); Janja Šegel (54.78); Katja Fain (55.75); Hana Sekuti (56.04)	3:41.72	
