= 2022 FINA World Swimming Championships (25 m) – Women's 200 metre backstroke =

Swimming competition

Women's 200 metre backstroke at the 2022 FINA World Swimming Championships (25 m)
- Venue: Melbourne Sports and Aquatic Centre
- Location: Melbourne, Australia
- Dates: 18 December (heats and final)
- Competitors: 35 from 27 nations
- Winning time: 1:59.26

Medalists
gold medal	Kaylee McKeown	Australia
silver medal	Claire Curzan	United States
bronze medal	Kylie Masse	Canada

The Women's 200 metre backstroke competition of the 2022 FINA World Swimming Championships (25 m) was held on 18 December 2022.

== Records ==
Prior to the competition, the existing world and championship records were as follows.

World record	Kaylee McKeown (AUS)	1:58.94	Brisbane, Australia	28 November 2020
Competition record	Katinka Hosszú (HUN)	1:59.23	Doha, Qatar	5 December 2014

== Results ==
=== Heats ===
The heats were started at 11:44.

Rank	Heat	Lane	Name	Nationality	Time	Notes
1	3	1	Claire Curzan	United States	2:02.05	Q
2	5	4	Kaylee McKeown	Australia	2:02.32	Q
3	5	5	Kylie Masse	Canada	2:02.54	Q
4	4	5	Margherita Panziera	Italy	2:02.88	Q
5	5	6	Pauline Mahieu	France	2:02.96	Q
6	4	3	Peng Xuwei	China	2:03.27	Q
7	4	4	Kira Toussaint	Netherlands	2:03.40	Q
8	5	3	Ingrid Wilm	Canada	2:03.57	Q
9	3	5	Isabelle Stadden	United States	2:03.78	
10	5	1	Hanna Rosvall	Sweden	2:04.37	
11	4	7	África Zamorano	Spain	2:04.85	
12	3	2	Adela Piskorska	Poland	2:05.05	
12	3	4	Minna Atherton	Australia	2:05.05	
14	4	6	Liu Yaxin	China	2:05.10	
15	5	2	Sayaka Akase	Japan	2:05.13	
16	4	2	Laura Bernat	Poland	2:05.54	
17	3	7	Emma Terebo	France	2:05.94	
18	3	6	Chiaki Yamamoto	Japan	2:06.10	
19	5	8	Simona Kubová	Czech Republic	2:06.19	
20	5	7	Tessa Vermeulen	Netherlands	2:06.58	
21	2	4	Gabriela Georgieva	Bulgaria	2:07.25	
22	3	3	Ingeborg Løyning	Norway	2:07.67	
23	4	1	Emma Godwin	New Zealand	2:07.91	
24	2	3	Andrea Berrino	Argentina	2:08.10	
25	4	8	Tamara Potocká	Slovakia	2:08.61	
26	2	5	Hannah Pearse	South Africa	2:08.84	
27	3	8	Chloe Isleta	Philippines	2:09.17	
28	2	8	Cindy Cheung	Hong Kong	2:09.55	
29	2	7	Alexia Sotomayor	Peru	2:12.36	
30	1	4	Carolina Cermelli	Panama	2:12.40	NR
31	2	1	Elizabeth Jiménez	Dominican Republic	2:12.63	
32	2	6	Celina Márquez	El Salvador	2:13.61	
33	1	5	Anishta Teeluck	Mauritius	2:13.71	NR
34	1	3	Jennifer Harding-Marlin	Saint Kitts and Nevis	2:31.55	
35	1	6	Hamna Ahmed	Maldives	2:59.77	
	2	2	Tatiana Salcuțan	Moldova	Did not start	

=== Final ===
The final was held at 20:08.

Rank	Lane	Name	Nationality	Time	Notes
1st place, gold medalist(s)	5	Kaylee McKeown	Australia	1:59.26	
2nd place, silver medalist(s)	4	Claire Curzan	United States	2:00.53	
3rd place, bronze medalist(s)	3	Kylie Masse	Canada	2:01.26	NR
4	8	Ingrid Wilm	Canada	2:01.78	
5	6	Margherita Panziera	Italy	2:02.18	
6	7	Peng Xuwei	China	2:02.39	NR
7	2	Pauline Mahieu	France	2:03.21	
8	1	Kira Toussaint	Netherlands	2:05.20	
