= Isabelle Stadden =

American swimmer (born 2002)

Personal information
- Born: July 9, 2002 (age 23) Decatur, Illinois, U.S.
- Height: 5 ft 10 in (178 cm)

Sport
- Sport: Swimming
- Strokes: Backstroke
- College team: University of California, Berkeley
Medal record
Women's swimming
Representing the United States
World Championships (SC)
| Bronze medal – third place | 2021 Abu Dhabi | 200 m backstroke |
Pan American Games
| Gold medal – first place | 2019 Lima | 4×100 m medley |
| Silver medal – second place | 2019 Lima | 200 m backstroke |
Junior Pan Pacific Championships
| Gold medal – first place | 2018 Suva | 200 m backstroke |
Representing the California Golden Bears
NCAA Championships
| Bronze medal – third place | 2021 Greensboro | 200 y backstroke |
| Bronze medal – third place | 2023 Knoxville | 200 y backstroke |

Isabelle Stadden (born July 9, 2002) is an American swimmer who specializes in the backstroke.

== Career ==
Stadden was born in Decatur, Illinois, in 2002. She grew up in Blaine, Minnesota, and attended Blaine High School.

=== 2018 ===
At the 2018 USA Championships in July, Stadden won the bronze medal in the 200 m backstroke.

The following month, she competed at the 2018 Junior Pan Pacific Championships and won the gold medal in the 200 m backstroke with a championship record time of 2:09.52.

=== 2019 ===
Stadden competed at the 2019 Pan American Games in August. She won the silver medal in the 200 m backstroke. She swam in the heats of the women's 4 × 100 m medley relay, and the U.S. finished first in the final, earning Stadden a gold medal.

In December, Stadden won the gold medal in the 200 m backstroke at the 2019 U.S. Open.

=== 2021 ===
Stadden enrolled at the University of California, Berkeley, and started competing for the California Golden Bears. At the 2021 NCAA Division I Championships in March, she won the bronze medal in the 200 y backstroke and finished fifth in the 100 y backstroke.

In June, Stadden competed at the 2021 U.S. Olympic trials. She finished fifth in the 100 m backstroke and fourth in the 200 m backstroke and did not qualify for the Olympic team.

In December, Stadden competed at the 2021 World Championships (25 m). She won the bronze medal in the 200 m backstroke.

=== 2022 ===
At the 2022 NCAA Division I Championships in March, Stadden finished fourth in the 200 y backstroke and seventh in the 100 y backstroke.

In July, Stadden competed at the 2022 USA Championships. She won the gold medal in the 200 m backstroke and the bronze medal in the 100 m backstroke.

Stadden competed at the 2022 World Championships (25 m) in December. In the 100 m backstroke, she finished eighth. In the 200 m backstroke, she did not qualify for the final.

=== 2023 ===
At the 2023 NCAA Division I Championships in March, Stadden won the bronze medal in the 200 y backstroke and finished sixth in the 100 y backstroke.

In July, Stadden competed at the 2023 USA Championships. She finished fifth in the 50 m backstroke, fifth in the 100 m backstroke, and sixth in the 200 m backstroke.
