= Swimming at the 2019 Pan American Games – Women's 200 metre backstroke =

Women's 200 metre backstroke at the 2019 Pan American Games
- Venues: Villa Deportiva Nacional, VIDENA
- Dates: August 7 (preliminaries and finals)
- Competitors: 21 from 16 nations

Medalists
Gold medal	Alexandra Walsh	United States
Silver medal	Isabelle Stadden	United States
Bronze medal	Mackenzie Glover	Canada

The women's 200 metre backstroke competition of the swimming events at the 2019 Pan American Games are scheduled to be held August 7th, 2019 at the Villa Deportiva Nacional Videna cluster.

== Records ==
Prior to this competition, the existing world and Pan American Games records were as follows:

World record	Regan Smith (USA)	2:03.35	Gwangju, South Korea	July 26, 2019
Pan American Games record	Hilary Caldwell (CAN)	2:08.22	Toronto, Canada	July 15, 2015

== Results ==
KEY:	q	Fastest non-qualifiers	Q	Qualified	GR	Games record	NR	National record	PB	Personal best	SB	Seasonal best

=== Heats ===
The first round will be held on August 7.

Rank	Heat	Lane	Name	Nationality	Time	Notes
1	3	4	Isabelle Stadden	United States	2:09.15	QA
2	2	4	Alexandra Walsh	United States	2:10.06	QA
3	3	5	Mackenzie Glover	Canada	2:11.60	QA
4	2	3	Fernanda de Goeij	Brazil	2:12.63	QA
5	2	5	Andrea Berrino	Argentina	2:13.68	QA
6	1	4	Madison Broad	Canada	2:14.25	QA
7	3	3	Krystal Lara Garzon	Dominican Republic	2:15.60	QA
8	1	3	Florencia Perotti	Argentina	2:16.67	QA
9	1	6	Celia Pulido Ortíz	Mexico	2:17.02	QB
10	2	6	McKenna DeBever	Peru	2:17.54	QB
11	3	2	Carmen Marquez Orellana	El Salvador	2:18.68	QB, NR
12	1	5	Athena Kovacs	Mexico	2:19.74	QB
13	3	6	Andrea Hurtado	Peru	2:20.32	QB
14	2	2	Laura Melo	Colombia	2:21.13	QB
15	2	7	Danielle Titus	Barbados	2:21.37	QB, NR
16	1	2	Andrea Becali Martí	Cuba	2:22.03	QB
17	1	1	Carolina Cermelli	Panama	2:22.14	
18	3	7	Trinidad Ardiles Quiroz	Chile	2:22.69	
19	1	7	Maria Contreras Ruiz	Ecuador	2:23.62	
20	2	1	Mayerly Escalante Hernandez	Venezuela	2:24.86	
21	3	1	Maria Jose Arrua	Paraguay	2:27.31	

=== Final B ===
The B final was also held on August 7.

Rank	Lane	Name	Nationality	Time	Notes
9	3	Carmen Marquez Orellana	El Salvador	2:14.76	NR
10	5	McKenna DeBever	Peru	2:17.38	
11	6	Athena Kovacs	Mexico	2:17.78	
12	4	Celia Pulido Ortíz	Mexico	2:17.84	
13	2	Andrea Hurtado	Peru	2:19.80	
14	7	Laura Melo	Colombia	2:21.29	
15	8	Andrea Becali Martí	Cuba	2:24.40	
16	1	Danielle Titus	Barbados	2:27.44	

=== Final A ===
The A final was also held on August 7.

Rank	Lane	Name	Nationality	Time	Notes
1st place, gold medalist(s)	5	Alexandra Walsh	United States	2:08.30	
2nd place, silver medalist(s)	4	Isabelle Stadden	United States	2:08.39	
3rd place, bronze medalist(s)	3	Mackenzie Glover	Canada	2:10.95	
4	6	Fernanda de Goeij	Brazil	2:11.95	SA
5	2	Andrea Berrino	Argentina	2:12.71	
6	7	Madison Broad	Canada	2:12.82	
7	8	Florencia Perotti	Argentina	2:16.75	
8	1	Krystal Lara Garzon	Dominican Republic	2:17.09	
