= 2022 FINA World Swimming Championships (25 m) – Women's 100 metre backstroke =

Swimming competition

Women's 100 metre backstroke at the 2022 FINA World Swimming Championships (25 m)
- Venue: Melbourne Sports and Aquatic Centre
- Location: Melbourne, Australia
- Dates: 13 December (heats and semifinals); 14 December (final)
- Competitors: 47 from 38 nations
- Winning time: 55.49

Medalists
gold medal	Kaylee McKeown	Australia
silver medal	Mollie O'Callaghan	Australia
bronze medal	Claire Curzan	United States
bronze medal	Ingrid Wilm	Canada

The Women's 100 metre backstroke competition of the 2022 FINA World Swimming Championships (25 m) was held on 13 and 14 December 2022.

== Records ==
Prior to the competition, the existing world and championship records were as follows.

World record	Minna Atherton (AUS)	54.89	Budapest, Hungary	26 November 2021
Competition record	Katinka Hosszú (HUN)	55.03	Doha, Qatar	4 December 2014

== Results ==
=== Heats ===
The heats were started on 13 December at 11:28.

Rank	Heat	Lane	Name	Nationality	Time	Notes
1	6	4	Louise Hansson	Sweden	56.04	Q
2	6	5	Ingrid Wilm	Canada	56.15	Q
3	6	3	Mollie O'Callaghan	Australia	56.35	Q
4	5	7	Hanna Rosvall	Sweden	56.57	Q
5	4	4	Kira Toussaint	Netherlands	56.62	Q
6	4	3	Simona Kubová	Czech Republic	56.76	Q
7	4	8	Isabelle Stadden	United States	56.85	Q
8	4	2	Pauline Mahieu	France	56.88	Q
9	5	1	Claire Curzan	United States	56.90	Q
10	4	5	Maaike de Waard	Netherlands	57.01	Q
10	5	4	Kylie Masse	Canada	57.01	Q
12	5	5	Kaylee McKeown	Australia	57.11	Q
13	6	2	Wan Letian	China	57.49	Q
14	3	6	Medi Harris	Great Britain	57.51	Q
14	6	1	Sayaka Akase	Japan	57.51	Q
16	6	6	Silvia Scalia	Italy	57.54	Q
17	4	6	Peng Xuwei	China	57.67	
18	5	6	Rio Shirai	Japan	57.71	
19	6	7	Margherita Panziera	Italy	57.72	
20	4	7	Adela Piskorska	Poland	57.74	
21	3	8	Kim San-ha	South Korea	58.02	NR
22	5	8	África Zamorano	Spain	58.28	
23	5	2	Ingeborg Løyning	Norway	58.49	
24	5	3	Analia Pigrée	France	58.50	
25	3	5	Hazel Ouwehand	New Zealand	58.56	
26	2	6	Miranda Grana	Mexico	58.80	
27	3	3	Andrea Berrino	Argentina	58.85	
28	6	8	Stephanie Au	Hong Kong	59.05	
29	4	1	Caroline Pilhatsch	Austria	59.71	
30	3	2	Gabriela Georgieva	Bulgaria	59.84	
31	3	4	Chloe Isleta	Philippines	1:00.25	
32	2	8	Abril Aunchayna	Uruguay	1:01.07	
33	3	1	Celina Márquez	El Salvador	1:01.08	
34	2	5	Tatiana Salcutan	Moldova	1:01.16	
35	2	3	Elizabeth Jiménez	Dominican Republic	1:01.44	
36	3	7	Milla Drakopoulos	South Africa	1:01.52	
37	2	4	Donata Katai	Zimbabwe	1:01.85	
38	2	2	Amani Al-Obaidli	Bahrain	1:03.37	
39	2	7	Anishta Teeluck	Mauritius	1:03.44	
40	1	2	Cheang Weng Lam	Macau	1:04.74	
41	1	5	Enkh-Amgalangiin Ariuntamir	Mongolia	1:04.98	NR
42	1	4	Salome Nikolaishvili	Georgia	1:07.03	
43	1	1	Idealy Tendrinavalona	Madagascar	1:08.30	
44	1	6	Naya Hughes	Botswana	1:09.68	
45	1	3	Aishath Sausan	Maldives	1:14.05	
46	1	8	Shoko Litulumar	Northern Mariana Islands	1:14.72	
47	1	7	Raya Young	Eswatini	1:18.68	
	2	1	Ganga Senavirathne	Sri Lanka	Did not start	

=== Semifinals ===
The semifinals were started on 13 December at 20:27.

Rank	Heat	Lane	Name	Nationality	Time	Notes
1	2	5	Mollie O'Callaghan	Australia	55.80	Q
2	1	4	Ingrid Wilm	Canada	55.92	Q
3	2	2	Claire Curzan	United States	56.08	Q
3	2	4	Louise Hansson	Sweden	56.08	Q
5	2	7	Kylie Masse	Canada	56.13	Q
6	1	7	Kaylee McKeown	Australia	56.35	Q
7	2	6	Isabelle Stadden	United States	56.45	Q
8	2	3	Kira Toussaint	Netherlands	56.54	Q
9	1	5	Hanna Rosvall	Sweden	56.59	
10	1	2	Maaike de Waard	Netherlands	56.78	
11	1	3	Simona Kubová	Czech Republic	56.80	
12	1	1	Medi Harris	Great Britain	57.40	
13	1	6	Pauline Mahieu	France	57.43	
14	2	1	Wan Letian	China	57.59	
15	2	8	Sayaka Akase	Japan	57.65	
16	1	8	Silvia Scalia	Italy	58.02	

=== Final ===
The final was held on 14 December at 20:25.

Rank	Lane	Name	Nationality	Time	Notes
1st place, gold medalist(s)	7	Kaylee McKeown	Australia	55.49	
2nd place, silver medalist(s)	4	Mollie O'Callaghan	Australia	55.62	
3rd place, bronze medalist(s)	3	Claire Curzan	United States	55.74	
3rd place, bronze medalist(s)	5	Ingrid Wilm	Canada	55.74	
5	6	Louise Hansson	Sweden	55.89	
6	2	Kylie Masse	Canada	56.18	
7	8	Kira Toussaint	Netherlands	56.41	
8	1	Isabelle Stadden	United States	57.20	
