= Abbey Harkin =

Australian swimmer (born 1998)

Personal information
- Nationality: Australian
- Born: 6 May 1998 (age 28) Hunter Valley, New South Wales, Australia

Sport
- Sport: Swimming
- Strokes: Breaststroke, freestyle
Medal record
Representing Australia
World Championships (LC)
| Gold medal – first place | 2024 Doha | 4×100 m medley |
| Silver medal – second place | 2023 Fukuoka | 4×100 m medley |
| Silver medal – second place | 2024 Doha | 4×100 m freestyle |
| Silver medal – second place | 2024 Doha | 4×100 m mixed medley |
| Bronze medal – third place | 2024 Doha | 4×200 m freestyle |
World Championships (SC)
| Bronze medal – third place | 2018 Hangzhou | 4×200 freestyle |

Abbey Harkin (born 6 May 1998) is an Australian swimmer. She competed in the women's 200 metre breaststroke at the 2020 Summer Olympics but did not progress from the heats. She was selected to compete in the 100 and 200 metre breaststroke at the 2022 Commonwealth Games in Birmingham, England.
