= 2022 FINA World Swimming Championships (25 m) – Women's 4 × 100 metre medley relay =

Swimming competition

Women's 4 × 100 metre medley relay at the 2022 FINA World Swimming Championships (25 m)
- Venue: Melbourne Sports and Aquatic Centre
- Location: Melbourne, Australia
- Dates: 18 December (heats and finals)
- Competitors: 80 from 15 nations
- Teams: 15
- Winning time: 3:44.35 WR

Medalists
gold medal	Claire Curzan; Lilly King; Torri Huske; Kate Douglass; Alex Walsh; Erika Brown	United States
silver medal	Kaylee McKeown; Jenna Strauch; Emma McKeon; Meg Harris; Mollie O'Callaghan; Chelsea Hodges; Alexandria Perkins	Australia
bronze medal	Ingrid Wilm; Sydney Pickrem; Maggie Mac Neil; Taylor Ruck; Kylie Masse; Rachel Nicol; Katerine Savard; Rebecca Smith	Canada

The Women's 4 × 100 metre medley relay competition of the 2022 FINA World Swimming Championships (25 m) was held on 18 December 2022.

== Records ==
Prior to the competition, the existing world and championship records were as follows.

World record	United States (USA)	3:44.52	Budapest, Hungary	21 November 2020
Competition record	United States (USA)	3:45.58	Hangzhou, China	16 December 2018

The following new records were set during this competition:

Date	Event	Name	Nation	Time	Record
18 December	Final	Claire Curzan (56.47); Lilly King (1:02.88); Torri Huske (54.53); Kate Douglass (50.47)	United States	3:44.35	WR

== Results ==
=== Heats ===
The heats were started at 12:17.

Rank	Heat	Lane	Nation	Swimmers	Time	Notes
1	1	5	United States	Alex Walsh (56.60); Lilly King (1:04.03); Kate Douglass (54.46); Erika Brown (52.58)	3:47.67	Q
2	1	3	Australia	Mollie O'Callaghan (55.81); Chelsea Hodges (1:05.24); Alexandria Perkins (56.27); Meg Harris (51.58)	3:48.90	Q
3	1	4	Canada	Kylie Masse (56.41); Rachel Nicol (1:05.44); Katerine Savard (57.21); Rebecca Smith (52.34)	3:51.40	Q
4	2	4	Sweden	Louise Hansson (56.84); Klara Thormalm (1:05.27); Sara Junevik (56.05); Sofia Åstedt (54.33)	3:52.49	Q
5	2	2	Japan	Rio Shirai (58.11); Reona Aoki (1:04.31); Ai Soma (56.98); Yume Jinno (53.52)	3:52.92	Q
6	2	6	Netherlands	Maaike de Waard (56.78); Tes Schouten (1:04.75); Kim Busch (57.81); Valerie van Roon (53.61)	3:52.95	Q, NR
7	1	6	France	Mary-Ambre Moluh (57.36); Charlotte Bonnet (1:05.58); Béryl Gastaldello (56.90); Mélanie Henique (53.71)	3:53.55	Q, NR
8	2	5	China	Wan Letian (58.08); Yang Chang (1:05.26); Yang Junxuan (57.32); Cheng Yujie (53.91)	3:54.57	Q
9	2	3	Italy	Silvia Scalia (57.64); Sara Franceschi (1:06.77); Ilaria Cusinato (57.94); Costanza Cocconcelli (53.27)	3:55.62	
10	1	7	South Korea	Kim San-ha (58.01) NR; Moon Su-a (1:06.87); Kim Seo-yeong (57.79); Hur Yeon-kyung (53.99)	3:56.66	NR
11	1	8	Slovakia	Tamara Potocká (58.73); Andrea Podmaníková (1:07.13); Zora Ripková (59.24); Teresa Ivanová (54.40)	3:59.50	NR
12	2	7	South Africa	Milla Drakopoulos (1:00.30); Emily Visagie (1:07.40); Rebecca Meder (57.68); Caitlin de Lange (54.26)	3:59.64	AF
13	1	1	New Zealand	Emma Godwin (1:00.01); Helena Gasson (1:06.77); Hazel Ouwehand (1:00.01); Rebecca Moynihan (54.13)	4:00.92	NR
14	2	1	Hong Kong	Cindy Cheung (1:01.82); Lam Hoi Kiu (1:09.10); Yeung Hoi Ching (1:00.31); Sze Hang-yu (54.03)	4:05.26	
15	2	8	Peru	Alexia Sotomayor (1:01.44); McKenna DeBever (1:11.26); María Fe Muñoz (1:03.21); Rafaela Fernandini (56.82)	4:12.73	NR
	1	2	Great Britain		Did not start	

=== Final ===
The final was held at 21:03.

Rank	Lane	Nation	Swimmers	Time	Notes
1st place, gold medalist(s)	4	United States	Claire Curzan (56.47); Lilly King (1:02.88); Torri Huske (54.53); Kate Douglass (50.47)	3:44.35	WR
2nd place, silver medalist(s)	5	Australia	Kaylee McKeown (55.74); Jenna Strauch (1:04.49); Emma McKeon (53.93); Meg Harris (50.76)	3:44.92	OC
3rd place, bronze medalist(s)	3	Canada	Ingrid Wilm (55.36); Sydney Pickrem (1:04.42); Maggie Mac Neil (54.59); Taylor Ruck (51.85)	3:46.22	NR
4	7	Netherlands	Kira Toussaint (56.53); Tes Schouten (1:05.28); Maaike de Waard (55.42); Marrit Steenbergen (50.47)	3:47.70	NR
5	6	Sweden	Hanna Rosvall (56.37); Sophie Hansson (1:04.96); Louise Hansson (54.57); Michelle Coleman (51.94)	3:47.84	
6	1	France	Pauline Mahieu (57.22); Charlotte Bonnet (1:04.12); Béryl Gastaldello (56.20); Mary-Ambre Moluh (52.74)	3:50.28	NR
7	8	China	Peng Xuwei (57.64); Tang Qianting (1:03.56); Yang Junxuan (57.49); Liu Shuhan (52.75)	3:51.44	
	2	Japan	Sayaka Akase (58.07); Reona Aoki (1:04.65); Ai Soma (57.19); Chihiro Igarashi	Disqualified	
