= 2021 FINA World Swimming Championships (25 m) – Women's 200 metre backstroke =

Swimming competition

Women's 200 metre backstroke at the 2021 FINA World Swimming Championships (25 m)
- Venue: Etihad Arena
- Location: Abu Dhabi, United Arab Emirates
- Dates: 18 December (heats and final)
- Competitors: 25 from 23 nations
- Winning time: 2:01.58

Medalists
gold medal	Rhyan White	United States
silver medal	Kylie Masse	Canada
bronze medal	Isabelle Stadden	United States

The Women's 200 metre backstroke competition of the 2021 FINA World Swimming Championships (25 m) was held on 18 December 2021.

== Records ==
Prior to the competition, the existing world and championship records were as follows.

World record	Kaylee McKeown (AUS)	1:58.94	Brisbane, Australia	28 November 2020
Competition record	Katinka Hosszú (HUN)	1:59.23	Doha, Qatar	5 December 2014

== Results ==
=== Heats ===
The heats were started at 10:49.

Rank	Heat	Lane	Name	Nationality	Time	Notes
1	3	2	Isabelle Stadden	United States	2:03.26	Q
2	3	6	Rhyan White	United States	2:04.08	Q
3	1	4	Margherita Panziera	Italy	2:04.58	Q
4	2	4	Kylie Masse	Canada	2:04.79	Q
5	2	5	Anastasiya Shkurdai	Belarus	2:04.98	Q
6	1	2	Peng Xuwei	China	2:05.12	Q
7	3	4	Kira Toussaint	Netherlands	2:05.27	Q
8	3	5	Daryna Zevina	Ukraine	2:05.36	Q
9	1	3	Ekaterina Avramova	Turkey	2:06.00	
10	2	6	Eszter Szabó-Feltóthy	Hungary	2:06.13	
11	2	3	Katie Shanahan	Great Britain	2:06.24	
12	2	2	Liu Yaxin	China	2:06.29	
13	1	5	Daria Ustinova	Russian Swimming Federation	2:06.32	
14	3	3	Lena Grabowski	Austria	2:08.39	
15	2	7	Gabriela Georgieva	Bulgaria	2:08.52	
16	1	1	Andrea Becali	Cuba	2:12.01	NR
17	2	8	Elizabeth Jiménez	Dominican Republic	2:14.23	
18	1	7	Florencia Perotti	Argentina	2:14.36	
19	2	1	Elisabeth Erlendsdóttir	Faroe Islands	2:14.55	
20	3	8	Nicole Frank	Uruguay	2:15.71	
21	3	7	Tamara Potocká	Slovakia	2:16.59	
22	1	8	Samantha van Vuure	Curaçao	2:22.82	
23	3	0	Chrysoula Karamanou	Cyprus	2:23.48	
24	1	0	Leilaa Al-Khatib	United Arab Emirates	2:26.27	
25	2	0	Aishath Sausan	Maldives	2:43.61	NR
	1	6	Hanna Rosvall	Sweden	DNS	
	3	1	Nina Kost	Switzerland	DNS	

=== Final ===
The final was held at 18:23.

Rank	Lane	Name	Nationality	Time	Notes
1st place, gold medalist(s)	5	Rhyan White	United States	2:01.58	
2nd place, silver medalist(s)	6	Kylie Masse	Canada	2:02.07	
3rd place, bronze medalist(s)	4	Isabelle Stadden	United States	2:02.20	
4	7	Peng Xuwei	China	2:03.00	NR
5	3	Margherita Panziera	Italy	2:03.20	
6	2	Anastasiya Shkurdai	Belarus	2:03.26	
7	1	Kira Toussaint	Netherlands	2:04.74	
8	8	Daryna Zevina	Ukraine	2:06.57	
