= Chinese Taipei at the 2013 World Aquatics Championships =

- Flag of Chinese Taipei
- FINA code: TPE
- National federation: Chinese Taipei Swimming Association
- Website: www.swimming.org.tw

in Barcelona, Spain
- Competitors: 5 in 2 sports
- Medals: Gold 0 Silver 0 Bronze 0 Total 0

World Aquatics Championships appearances
- 1973; 1975; 1978; 1982; 1986; 1991; 1994; 1998; 2001; 2003; 2005; 2007; 2009; 2011; 2013; 2015; 2017; 2019; 2022; 2023; 2024

Chinese Taipei is competing at the 2013 World Aquatics Championships in Barcelona, Spain between 19 July and 4 August 2013.

== Diving ==
Chinese Taipei qualified two quotas for the following diving events.

Women

Athlete	Event	Preliminaries		Semifinals		Final	
Athlete	Event	Points	Rank	Points	Rank	Points	Rank
Huang En-tien	1 m springboard	189.75	36	—		did not advance	
Huang En-tien	3 m springboard	229.20	26	did not advance			

== Swimming ==
Swimmers from Chinese Taipei achieved qualifying standards in the following events (up to a maximum of 2 swimmers in each event at the A-standard entry time, and 1 at the B-standard):

Men

Athlete	Event	Heat		Semifinal		Final	
Athlete	Event	Time	Rank	Time	Rank	Time	Rank
Hsu Chi-chieh	200 m butterfly	2:01.49	28	did not advance			
Wang Yu-lian	100 m freestyle	51.70	44	did not advance			
Wang Yu-lian	200 m freestyle	1:52.10	45	did not advance			

Women

Athlete	Event	Heat		Semifinal		Final	
Athlete	Event	Time	Rank	Time	Rank	Time	Rank
Chen I-chuan	50 m breaststroke	33.39	=50	did not advance			
Chen I-chuan	100 m breaststroke	1:13.25	46	did not advance			
Cheng Wan-jung	100 m butterfly	1:01.61	34	did not advance			
Cheng Wan-jung	200 m individual medley	2:18.47	34	did not advance			
