= 2021 FINA World Swimming Championships (25 m) – Women's 4 × 100 metre freestyle relay =

Swimming competition

Women's 4 × 100 metre freestyle relay at the 2021 FINA World Swimming Championships (25 m)
- Venue: Etihad Arena
- Location: Abu Dhabi, United Arab Emirates
- Dates: 16 December (heats and final)
- Competitors: 61 from 14 nations
- Teams: 14
- Winning time: 3:28.52

Medalists
gold medal	Kayla Sanchez; Maggie Mac Neil; Rebecca Smith; Katerine Savard; Bailey Andison	Canada
gold medal	Kate Douglass; Claire Curzan; Katharine Berkoff; Abbey Weitzeil; Torri Huske	United States
bronze medal	Sarah Sjöström; Michelle Coleman; Sophie Hansson; Louise Hansson; Sara Junevik	Sweden

The Women's 4 × 100 metre freestyle relay competition of the 2021 FINA World Swimming Championships (25 m) was held on 16 December 2021.

== Records ==
Prior to the competition, the existing world and championship records were as follows.

World record	Netherlands (NED)	3:26.53	Doha, Qatar	5 December 2014
Competition record	Netherlands (NED)	3:26.53	Doha, Qatar	5 December 2014

== Results ==
=== Heats ===
The heats were started at 12:18.

Rank	Heat	Lane	Nation	Swimmers	Time	Notes
1	2	5	Netherlands	Kim Busch (53.44); Marrit Steenbergen (52.13); Tessa Giele (53.26); Ranomi Kromowidjojo (52.56)	3:31.39	Q
2	2	4	United States	Kate Douglass (52.98); Claire Curzan (52.97); Katharine Berkoff (52.95); Torri Huske (53.01)	3:31.91	Q
3	2	3	China	Zhang Yufei (53.24); Cheng Yujie (52.80); Zhu Menghui (53.22); Wu Qingfeng (52.69)	3:31.95	Q
4	1	5	Sweden	Michelle Coleman (52.81); Sarah Sjöström (51.45); Sara Junevik (54.01); Louise Hansson (53.79)	3:32.06	Q
5	2	6	Russian Swimming Federation	Maria Kameneva (52.61); Ekaterina Nikonova (53.15); Arina Surkova (53.26); Daria Klepikova (53.81)	3:32.83	Q
6	1	4	Canada	Katerine Savard (53.16); Kayla Sanchez (51.76); Rebecca Smith (53.08); Bailey Andison (55.11)	3:33.11	Q
7	2	2	Hungary	Fanni Gyurinovics (53.33); Zsuzsanna Jakabos (53.56); Nikolett Pádár (54.43); Ajna Késely (54.88)	3:36.20	Q, NR
8	2	8	Austria	Lena Kreundl (53.95); Cornelia Pammer (54.77); Nina Gangl (55.11); Lena Opatril (54.94)	3:38.77	Q
9	1	3	Germany	Annika Bruhn (54.75); Marie Pietruschka (54.62); Isabel Marie Gose (55.15); Marlen Kullmann (54.70)	3:39.22	
10	2	7	South Korea	Jeong So-eun (54.19); Ryu Ji-won (55.67); Han Da-kyung (56.78); Kim Seo-yeong (53.76)	3:40.40	NR
11	2	1	Slovakia	Lillian Slušná (55.77); Zora Ripková (54.70); Sabína Kupčová (55.57); Tamara Potocká (55.82)	3:41.86	NR
12	1	1	Thailand	Jenjira Srisaard (55.53); Kornkarnjana Sapianchai (56.28); Kamonchanok Kwanmuang (56.45); Jinjutha Pholjamjumrus (57.63)	3:45.89	
13	1	7	Turkey	Selen Özbilen (56.33); Nida Eliz Üstündağ (56.87); Merve Tuncel (58.28); Deniz Ertan (57.83)	3:49.31	
	1	6	Hong Kong	Katii Tang (55.46); Tam Hoi Lam; Natalie Kan; Sze Hang Yu	DSQ	
	1	2	Singapore		DNS	

=== Final ===
The final will be held at 19:47.

Rank	Lane	Nation	Swimmers	Time	Notes
1st place, gold medalist(s)	7	Canada	Kayla Sanchez (51.73); Maggie Mac Neil (52.07); Rebecca Smith (52.11); Katerine Savard (52.61)	3:28.52	NR
1st place, gold medalist(s)	5	United States	Kate Douglass (52.39); Claire Curzan (52.25); Katharine Berkoff (52.38); Abbey Weitzeil (51.50)	3:28.52	
3rd place, bronze medalist(s)	6	Sweden	Sarah Sjöström (51.45); Michelle Coleman (52.06); Sophie Hansson (53.41); Louise Hansson (51.88)	3:28.80	NR
4	4	Netherlands	Ranomi Kromowidjojo (52.22); Marrit Steenbergen (51.76); Kim Busch (53.06); Kira Toussaint (51.82)	3:28.86	
5	3	China	Cheng Yujie (53.14); Zhang Yufei (52.32); Zhu Menghui (53.05); Wu Qingfeng (52.66)	3:31.17	
6	2	Russian Swimming Federation	Maria Kameneva (52.60); Ekaterina Nikonova (52.97); Arina Surkova (53.32); Daria S. Ustinova (52.66)	3:31.55	NR
7	1	Hungary	Fanni Gyurinovics (53.78); Zsuzsanna Jakabos (53.40); Nikolett Pádár (54.73); Ajna Késely (55.03)	3:36.94	
8	8	Austria	Lena Kreundl (53.39); Cornelia Pammer (55.45); Nina Gangl (55.33); Lena Opatril (55.01)	3:39.18	
