= Claire Curzan =

American swimmer (born 2004)

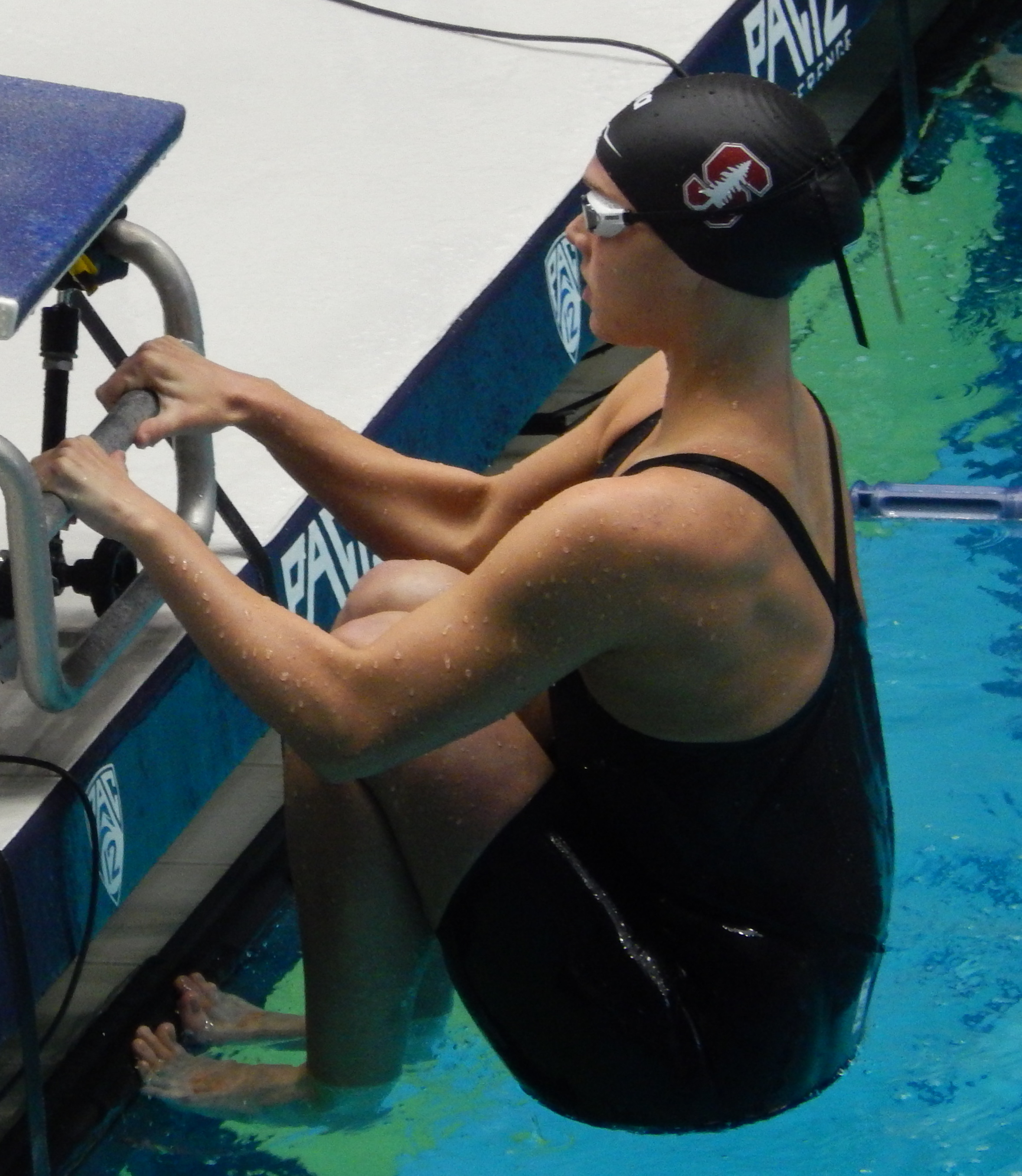
- Curzan in 2023

Personal information
- National team: United States
- Born: June 30, 2004 (age 22) Cary, North Carolina, U.S.

Sport
- Sport: Swimming
- Strokes: Butterfly, backstroke, freestyle
- Club: TAC Titans Swim Club
- College team: Stanford University (2022–23); University of Virginia (2023–)
Medal record
Women's swimming
Representing the United States
Olympic Games
Silver medal – second place	2020 Tokyo	4×100 m medley
World Championships (LC)
Gold medal – first place	2022 Budapest	4×100 m medley
Gold medal – first place	2022 Budapest	4×100 m mixed medley
Gold medal – first place	2024 Doha	50 m backstroke
Gold medal – first place	2024 Doha	100 m backstroke
Gold medal – first place	2024 Doha	200 m backstroke
Gold medal – first place	2024 Doha	4×100 m mixed medley
Gold medal – first place	2025 Singapore	4×100 m medley
Silver medal – second place	2024 Doha	100 m butterfly
Bronze medal – third place	2022 Budapest	100 m backstroke
Bronze medal – third place	2022 Budapest	4×100 m freestyle
Bronze medal – third place	2022 Budapest	4×100 m mixed freestyle
Bronze medal – third place	2024 Doha	4×100 m mixed freestyle
Bronze medal – third place	2025 Singapore	200 m backstroke
World Championships (SC)
Gold medal – first place	2021 Abu Dhabi	4×100 m freestyle
Gold medal – first place	2021 Abu Dhabi	4×50 m freestyle
Gold medal – first place	2022 Melbourne	4×50 m freestyle
Gold medal – first place	2022 Melbourne	4×100 m medley
Silver medal – second place	2021 Abu Dhabi	4×50 m medley
Silver medal – second place	2021 Abu Dhabi	4×50 m mixed medley
Silver medal – second place	2022 Melbourne	50 m backstroke
Silver medal – second place	2022 Melbourne	200 m backstroke
Silver medal – second place	2022 Melbourne	4×100 m freestyle
Silver medal – second place	2022 Melbourne	4×50 m medley
Bronze medal – third place	2021 Abu Dhabi	50 m butterfly
Bronze medal – third place	2021 Abu Dhabi	100 m butterfly
Bronze medal – third place	2022 Melbourne	100 m backstroke
Pan Pacific Championships
Silver medal – second place	2026 Irvine	200 m backstroke
World Junior Championships
Gold medal – first place	2019 Budapest	4×100 m medley
Silver medal – second place	2019 Budapest	100 m backstroke
Bronze medal – third place	2019 Budapest	50 m butterfly
Bronze medal – third place	2019 Budapest	100 m butterfly
Representing Virginia Cavaliers
NCAA Championships
Gold medal – first place	2026 Atlanta	Team
Gold medal – first place	2026 Atlanta	100 m backstroke
Gold medal – first place	2026 Atlanta	200 m backstroke
Gold medal – first place	2026 Atlanta	4×50 m freestyle
Gold medal – first place	2026 Atlanta	4×100 m freestyle
Gold medal – first place	2026 Atlanta	4×50 m medley
Gold medal – first place	2026 Atlanta	4×100 m medley
Gold medal – first place	2025 Federal Way	Team
Gold medal – first place	2025 Federal Way	100 m backstroke
Gold medal – first place	2025 Federal Way	200 m backstroke
Gold medal – first place	2025 Federal Way	4×50 m freestyle
Gold medal – first place	2025 Federal Way	4×100 m freestyle
Gold medal – first place	2025 Federal Way	4×50 m medley
Gold medal – first place	2025 Federal Way	4×100 m medley
Silver medal – second place	2026 Atlanta	100 m butterfly
Silver medal – second place	2025 Federal Way	50 m freestyle

Claire Curzan (born June 30, 2004) is an American competitive swimmer and Olympian. Specialising in multiple events, she earned an Olympic silver medal in the 4×100 meter medley relay in the 2020 Summer Olympics by swimming the preliminary butterfly leg. She holds the world record in the 100 meter backstroke (short course), as well as junior world records in the long course 50 meter freestyle and the short course 50 meter butterfly. She also holds American records in the short course 200 meter backstroke and 200 yard backstroke. She currently swims for the Virginia Cavaliers.

Curzan was raised in Cary, North Carolina, and started swimming aged three. As a 15-year-old, she qualified for her first major international meet, the 2019 World Junior Championships. There, she won medals in three individual events: silver in the 100 meter backstroke, and bronze in the 50 meter and 100 meter butterfly. At the 2021 World Short Course Championships, she won bronze medals in the 50 meter butterfly and 100 meter butterfly. In 2022, she won a bronze medal in the 100 meter backstroke at the 2022 World Aquatics Championships and silver medals in the 50 meter backstroke and 200 meter backstroke as well as a bronze medal in the 100 meter backstroke at the 2022 World Short Course Championships. In 2024, she earned her first senior international individual gold medals, winning the 50 meter, 100 meter, and 200 meter backstroke events at the 2024 World Aquatics Championships.

== Early life and education ==
Curzan was raised in Cary, North Carolina and started swimming when she was three years old. She graduated from Cardinal Gibbons High School in Raleigh, North Carolina in 2022. She was also honored as the 2021–22 NCHSAA Female Athlete of the Year.

In October 2021, she committed to competing collegiately for Stanford University, where she started competing for the school team in the fall of 2022. In August 2023, she announced she was transferring to the University of Virginia, whose swim and dive team had won 3 consecutive NCAA championships.

== Swimming career ==
=== 2019 ===
==== 2019 World Junior Championships ====
2019 World Junior Championships
Gold medal – first place	4×100 m medley relay	3:59.13
Silver medal – second place	100 m backstroke	1:00.00
Bronze medal – third place	50 m butterfly	25.81
Bronze medal – third place	100 m butterfly	58.37

When she was 15 years of age, Curzan competed at the 2019 World Junior Championships in Budapest, Hungary, winning a total of four medals, of which three were in individual events. On August 21, she won her first medal of the Championships, a silver medal in the 100 meter backstroke with a time of 1:00.00. She followed her silver medal up with a bronze medal on August 23 in the 50 meter butterfly, where she finished third in 25.81 seconds, just 0.11 seconds behind the gold medalist in the event and fellow American Torri Huske. On the final day of competition, August 25, she finished third in the 100 meter butterfly with a time of 58.37, winning the bronze medal and missing out on the gold medal to Torri Huske. She wrapped up her competition swimming backstroke on the 4×100 meter medley relay, splitting a time of 1:00.75 and helping the relay win the gold medal in a time of 3:59.13.

=== 2020–2021 ===
As a 16-year-old in August 2020, Curzan set a new National Age Group record in the 100 yard butterfly for the girls 15–16 age group with a time of 49.73 seconds. In November, at the 2020 U.S. Open Swimming Championships, she won the gold medal in the 100 meter butterfly with a Championships record of 56.61 seconds, the bronze medal in the 100 meter freestyle with a 54.93, and placed fourth in the 50 meter freestyle with a 25.23 and the 100 meter backstroke with a 1:00.30. At the 2021 TAC Titans Premier Meet, conducted in long course meters in April, she became the second-fastest female American performer ever in the 100 meter butterfly, with a time of 56.20 seconds that moved her up in rankings behind fastest female American Dana Vollmer and ahead of third-fastest female American Kelsi Dahlia. The 56.20 was a girls 15–16 and 17–18 national age group record and a world junior record. The following month, at the 2021 TAC Spring Invitational, she set a new world junior record in the long course 50 meter freestyle with a time of 24.17 seconds. Two days later at the invitational, she set a new girls 15–16 national age group record in the long course 100 meter freestyle with a personal best time of 53.55 seconds, breaking the former record of 53.63 seconds by Missy Franklin in 2011.

==== 2020 Olympic Trials ====
In 2021, Curzan placed second in the final of the 100 meter butterfly at the US Olympic Team Trials in Omaha, Nebraska with a time of 56.43 seconds, qualifying her for the 2020 US Olympic Team. The 2020 Olympic Games were the first Olympic Games she qualified to compete at, making her just 16 years old when she qualified and 17 years old at her Olympic debut.

==== 2020 Summer Olympics ====
2020 Summer Olympics
Silver medal – second place	4×100 m medley relay	3:51.73 (h)

At the 2020 Summer Olympics in Tokyo, Japan and held in 2021 due to the COVID-19 pandemic, Curzan placed tenth in the 100 meter butterfly and won a silver medal in the 4×100 meter medley relay for her contribution swimming the butterfly leg of the relay in the prelims. The silver medal she won for her efforts as part of the prelims relay consisting of herself, Rhyan White (backstroke), Lilly King (breaststroke), and Erika Brown (freestyle) was her first Olympic medal of any kind.

==== 2021 World Short Course Championships ====
2021 World Championships (SC)
Gold medal – first place	4×100 m freestyle	3:28.52
Gold medal – first place	4×50 m freestyle	1:34.22
Silver medal – second place	4×50 m medley	1:43.61
Silver medal – second place	4×50 m mixed medley	1:37.04
Bronze medal – third place	50 m butterfly	24.55 (AM, WJ)
Bronze medal – third place	100 m butterfly	55.39 (WJ)

Curzan was announced to the United States team for the 2021 World Short Course Championships in late October, with the announcement of the team earning the number two spot for "The Week That Was" honor from Swimming World. Building up her short course racing prowess in advance of the 2021 World Championships, she broke the national high school records, both overall and independent records for each event, in the 100 meter butterfly with a time of 57.08 seconds, in the 50 meter freestyle with a 24.94, and in the 100 meter backstroke where she set the new record at 58.40 seconds. Her three records captured the number three spot for "The Week That Was" honor for the week of November 22.

Prior to the start of competition, Curzan entered to compete in three individual events, the 50 meter freestyle, 50 meter butterfly, and 100 meter butterfly. Commencing competition on day one, she swam in both the prelims and the final of the 4×100 meter freestyle relay, helping achieve a gold medal-win in the final with a time of 3:28.52, splitting a 52.25 for the second leg of the relay. In the morning of day two, she split a 24.87 for the butterfly leg of the 4×50 meter medley relay in the prelims heats, helping advance the relay to the final ranked first. She split a 24.56 for the same leg in the final, helping achieve a silver-medal-winning time of 1:43.61 with finals relay teammates Rhyan White, Lydia Jacoby, and Abbey Weitzeil. She qualified for the semifinals of the 50 meter butterfly in the morning prelims session on day three, ranking fourth with her time of 25.17 seconds. In the evening she qualified for the final of the 50 meter butterfly with a time of 25.20 seconds, which tied her with Arina Surkova of Russia and Torri Huske for fifth-rank heading into the final. For the final of the 4×50 meter mixed medley relay, she helped win the silver medal in a time of 1:37.04, swimming a 24.85 for the butterfly leg of the relay.

In the final of the 50 meter butterfly on day four, Curzan won the bronze medal with a world junior record, Americas record, and American record time of 24.55 seconds. In the prelims heats on day five, she ranked second in the 100 meter butterfly with a time of 56.46, less than half a second slower than first-ranked Louise Hansson of Sweden, and qualified for the semifinals in the evening. Later in the morning, she swam a 24.11 in the prelims of the 50 meter freestyle and qualified for the semifinals ranking eighth. Starting her competition in the evening, she tied the world junior record in the 100 meter butterfly with a time of 55.64 seconds in the semifinals and qualified for the final ranking second. Finishing her day five events, she qualified for the final of the 50 meter freestyle ranked sixth with a time of 23.80 seconds in the semifinals.

For her first final on the sixth and final day of competition, Curzan won a gold medal in the 4×50 meter freestyle relay with a relay time of 1:34.22 and to which she contributed a split of 23.40 seconds for the second leg of the relay. In her second final, she won a bronze medal in the 100 meter butterfly with a world junior record-setting time of 55.39 seconds, which was less than four-tenths of a second slower than the 55.04 swam by gold medalist Margaret MacNeil of Canada. In her third final of the session, she placed sixth in the 50 meter freestyle behind fifth-place finisher and teammate Abbey Weitzeil with a 23.91. In her fourth of four finals for the day, she helped achieve a fourth-place finish in the 4×100 meter medley relay alongside finals relay teammates Katharine Berkoff (backstroke), Emily Escobedo (breaststroke), and Abbey Weitzeil (freestyle), splitting a 55.61 for the butterfly leg of the relay.

=== 2022 ===
In February 2022, Curzan set a new national high school record in the 100 yard backstroke with a time of 50.47 seconds, which was over four-tenths of a second faster than the previous record from 2020 by Phoebe Bacon of 50.89 seconds. The next week, at the year's North Carolina High School State Championships, she set a new American record in the 100 yard butterfly with a time of 49.24 seconds and broke her national high school record in the 100 yard backstroke with a 49.61. At the 2022 US International Team Trials in April, she qualified for the 2022 World Aquatics Championships team in the 100 meter freestyle, 100 meter backstroke, 50 meter butterfly, and 100 meter butterfly.

==== 2022 World Championships ====
2022 World Championships (LC)
Gold medal – first place	4×100 m mixed medley	3:38.79
Gold medal – first place	4×100 m medley	3:53.78
Bronze medal – third place	4×100 m freestyle	3:32.58
Bronze medal – third place	100 m backstroke	58.67
Bronze medal – third place	4×100 m mixed freestyle	3:21.09

At the 2022 World Aquatics Championships, held at Danube Arena in Budapest, Hungary, Curzan won her first medal of competition in the 4×100 meter freestyle relay on day one, anchoring the relay with a 52.71 in the final to help win the bronze medal in 3:32.58. The next day, she placed fifth in the final of the 100 meter butterfly with a 56.74, which was over one second behind gold medalist Torri Huske. On June 20, day three, she won her first medal in an individual event, finishing third to win the bronze medal in the final of the 100 meter backstroke with a time of 58.67 seconds that was 1.10 seconds faster than the fourth-place finisher and 0.45 seconds slower than the first-place finisher. In the final of the 4×100 meter mixed medley relay the following day, she followed Hunter Armstrong (backstroke), Nic Fink (breaststroke), and Torri Huske (butterfly), with a 52.62 for the freestyle leg of the relay to help finish in a time of 3:38.79 and win the gold medal.

Two days later, Curzan swam a 53.81 in the final of the 100 meter freestyle, finishing 1.14 seconds behind gold medalist Mollie O'Callaghan of Australia to place eighth. The finals session of the following day, she started off with a fifth-place finish in the 50 meter butterfly in a personal best time of 25.43 seconds. She concluded the evening session winning a bronze medal in the 4×100 meter mixed freestyle relay in a 3:21.09 achieved with finals relay teammates Ryan Held, Brooks Curry, and Torri Huske. She won her second gold medal and final medal of the Championships on the eighth and final day, anchoring the 4×100 meter medley relay to a first-place finish 0.47 seconds ahead of the second-place team from Australia in a final time of 3:53.78.

==== 2022 World Short Course Championships ====
2022 World Championships (SC)
Gold medal – first place	4×50 m freestyle	1:33.89 (CR, AM)
Gold medal – first place	4×100 m medley	3:44.35 (WR)
Silver medal – second place	4×100 m freestyle	3:26.29 (AM)
Silver medal – second place	50 m backstroke	25.54 (NR)
Silver medal – second place	4×50 m medley	1:42.41
Silver medal – second place	200 m backstroke	2:00.53
Bronze medal – third place	100 m backstroke	55.74

On day one of the 2022 World Short Course Championships in December in Melbourne, Australia, Curzan won a silver medal in the 4×100 meter freestyle relay, contributing a 51.59 to the final, and an Americas and American record, time of 3:26.29 for the third leg of the relay in the final. The second day, she won a bronze medal in the 100 meter backstroke with a personal best time of 55.74 seconds that tied Ingrid Wilm of Canada. Later in the session, she tied for fifth-place with Mélanie Henique of France in the final of the 50 meter butterfly, finishing in a time of 24.92 seconds. Day three, she won her first gold medal of the Championships in the 4×50 meter freestyle relay, helping finish first in the final in a Championships, Americas, and American record time of 1:33.89.

In the final of the 50 meter backstroke on day four, Curzan set a new American record with a personal best time of 25.54 seconds and finished 0.29 seconds behind Margaret MacNeil, who set a new world record in the event, to win the silver medal. Approximately 20 minutes later, she ranked twelfth in the semifinals of the 50 meter freestyle with a 24.22, 0.85 seconds behind first-ranked Katarzyna Wasick of Poland, and did not advance to the final. Day five, she started the evening session off with a silver medal in the 4×50 meter medley relay, where she swam a 25.75 for the backstroke portion of the relay to contribute to a final time of 1:42.41. She finished her evening competition for the day in the semifinals of the 100 meter butterfly, ranking fifth with a 56.37 before withdrawing from competing in the final.

For her first of two finals on day six of six, Curzan won the silver medal in the 200 meter backstroke with a personal best time of 2:00.53, finishing 1.27 seconds behind gold medalist and world record holder in the event Kaylee McKeown of Australia. In her second of two finals, and her tenth event of the Championships, she won a gold medal in the 4×100 meter medley relay in a world record time of 3:44.35, contributing a 56.47 for the backstroke leg of the relay.

=== 2023 ===
==== 2023 Pac-12 Championships ====
Stating off the first collegiate championships season of her NCAA career on the first day of the 2023 Pac-12 Conference Championships, held in February at the King County Aquatic Center in Federal Way, Washington, Curzan led-off with a 23.34 for the backstroke leg of the 4×50 yard medley relay, helping place second in 1:35.42. The following day she won her first conference title in the 4×50 yard freestyle relay, where she contributed a 21.59 to a final time of 1:25.98 for the lead-off leg of the relay. After a disqualification in the final of the 100 yard butterfly on day three, she rebounded to win the first individual event conference title of her collegiate career in the 100 yard backstroke, where she set a new Championships record with a time of 49.46, which lowered the mark 0.04 seconds from the previous record set by Regan Smith one year earlier. The 49.46 also set a new girls 17–18 national age group record in the event. In her third event of the evening, she finished the backstroke leg of the 4×100 yard medley relay in 49.76 seconds to help win the conference title with a final mark of 3:25.79.

For her first event on the final day, Curzan won the gold medal and conference title in the 200 yard backstroke with a Championships record of 1:47.43, which was 0.84 seconds faster than the former record of 1:48.27 by Kathleen Baker in 2018. In her second of two events she won the conference title as well, this time anchoring with a 47.15 for the 4×100 yard freestyle relay to help finish first in 3:08.83.

==== 2023 NCAA Championships ====
In the 4×50 yard medley relay on day one of the 2023 NCAA Division I Championships in Knoxville, Tennessee, Curzan helped place ninth in a final time of 1:35.44. For the 4×50 yard freestyle relay the next day, she swam the second 50 yard portion of the relay in 20.98 seconds, contributing to a final time of 1:25.70 and a silver medal-win. In her first final on the evening of day three, she placed fourth in the 100 yard butterfly with a time 50.09 seconds. She improved to a third-place finish in her second final of the evening, the 100 yard backstroke, winning the bronze medal with a time of 50.08 seconds that was 1.82 seconds behind gold medalist Gretchen Walsh. Concluding the day in her third final of the evening, for the 4×100 yard medley relay, she helped finish in 3:26.10 and place fourth. On the fourth and final day, she won her first NCAA title in an individual event, finishing first in a time of 1:47.64 in the 200 yard backstroke. In her final event, she anchored the 4×100 yard freestyle relay to a silver medal-win in 3:08.54, splitting a 46.85.

=== 2026 ===
At the 2026 US Short Course World Championship trials, she set a women’s world record of 53.92 seconds in the 100 meter backstroke.

== International championships ==
Meet	50 free	100 free	50 back	100 back	200 back	50 fly	100 fly	4×50 free	4×100 free	4×50 medley	4×100 medley	4×50 mixed medley	4×100 mixed free	4×100 mixed medley
WJC 2019			8th (h)	2nd place, silver medalist(s)		3rd place, bronze medalist(s)	3rd place, bronze medalist(s)	—N/a		—N/a	1st place, gold medalist(s)	—N/a		
OG 2020			—N/a			—N/a	10th	—N/a		—N/a	(silver) ^{[a]}	—N/a	—N/a	
SCW 2021	6th					3rd place, bronze medalist(s)	3rd place, bronze medalist(s)	1st place, gold medalist(s)	1st place, gold medalist(s)	2nd place, silver medalist(s)	4th	2nd place, silver medalist(s)	—N/a	—N/a
WC 2022		8th		3rd place, bronze medalist(s)		5th	5th	—N/a	3rd place, bronze medalist(s)	—N/a	1st place, gold medalist(s)	—N/a	3rd place, bronze medalist(s)	1st place, gold medalist(s)
SCW 2022	12th		2nd place, silver medalist(s)	3rd place, bronze medalist(s)	2nd place, silver medalist(s)	5th	5th (SF)^{[b]}	1st place, gold medalist(s)	2nd place, silver medalist(s)	2nd place, silver medalist(s)	1st place, gold medalist(s)		—N/a	—N/a

^{a} Curzan swam only in the prelims heats.
^{b} Curzan withdrew after placing 5th in semi finals.

== Personal best times ==
=== Long course meters (50 m pool) ===
Event	Time	Meet	Location	Date	Notes	Ref
50 m freestyle	24.17	2021 TAC Spring Invitational	Cary, North Carolina	May 14, 2021	WJ	
100 m freestyle	53.55	2021 TAC Spring Invitational	Cary, North Carolina	May 16, 2021		
50 m backstroke	27.43	2024 World Aquatics Championships	Doha, Qatar	February 15, 2024		
100 m backstroke	58.29	2024 World Aquatics Championships	Doha, Qatar	February 13, 2024		
200 m backstroke	2:05.77	2024 World Aquatics Championships	Doha, Qatar	February 17, 2024		
50 m butterfly	25.43	2022 World Aquatics Championships	Budapest, Hungary	June 24, 2022		
100 m butterfly	56.20	2021 TAC Premier Meet	Cary, North Carolina	April 10, 2021		

Legend: e – equalled existing record; WJ – World junior record;
Records not set in finals: h – heat; sf – semifinal; r – relay 1st leg; rh – relay heat 1st leg; b – B final; † – en route to final mark; so – swim-off; tt – time trial

=== Short course meters (25 m pool) ===
Event	Time		Meet	Location	Date	Notes	Ref
50 m freestyle	23.80	sf	2021 World Short Course Championships	Abu Dhabi, United Arab Emirates	December 20, 2021		
50 m backstroke	25.26		US Short Course World Championship Trials	Westmont, Illinois	October 29, 2026		
100 m backstroke	53.92		US Short Course World Championship Trials	Westmont, Illinois	October 30, 2026	WR	
200 m backstroke	1:57.65		US Short Course World Championship Trials	Westmont, Illinois	October 31, 2026	NR	
50 m butterfly	24.55		2021 World Short Course Championships	Abu Dhabi, United Arab Emirates	December 19, 2021	WJ	
100 m butterfly	55.39		2021 World Short Course Championships	Abu Dhabi, United Arab Emirates	December 21, 2021		

Legend: e – equalled existing record; WR – World record; NR – American record; WJ – World junior record;
Records not set in finals: h – heat; sf – semifinal; r – relay 1st leg; rh – relay heat 1st leg; b – B final; † – en route to final mark; so – swim-off; tt – time trial

=== Short course yards (25 yd pool) ===
Event	Time	Meet	Location	Date	Notes	Ref
50 yd freestyle	21.50	2021 Speedo Sectionals - Cary	Cary, North Carolina	March 5, 2021		
100 yd backstroke	49.46	2023 Pac-12 Conference Championships	Federal Way, Washington	February 24, 2023		
200 yd backstroke	1:47.43	2023 Pac-12 Conference Championships	Federal Way, Washington	February 25, 2023		
100 yd butterfly	49.24	2021 North Carolina High School State Championships	Cary, North Carolina	February 10, 2022	Former NR	

Legend: e – equalled existing record; NR – American record;
Records not set in finals: h – heat; sf – semifinal; r – relay 1st leg; rh – relay heat 1st leg; b – B final; † – en route to final mark; so – swim-off; tt – time trial

== World records ==
=== Short course meters (25 m pool) ===
No.	Event	Time	Meet	Location	Date	Status	Ref
1	4×100 m medley relay^{[a]}	3:44.35	2022 World Short Course Championships	Melbourne, Australia	December 18, 2022	Former	
2	100 m backstroke	53.92	US Short Course World Championship Trials	Westmont, Illinois	October 30, 2026	Current	

^{a} split 56.47 (backstroke leg); with Lilly King (breaststroke leg), Torri Huske (butterfly leg), Kate Douglass (freestyle leg)

== Continental and national records ==
=== Short course meters (25 m pool) ===
No.	Event	Time	Meet	Location	Date	Age	Type	Status	Notes	Ref
1	50 m butterfly	24.55	2021 World Short Course Championships	Abu Dhabi, United Arab Emirates	December 19, 2021	17	AM, NR	Current	WJ	
2	4×100 m freestyle relay	3:26.29	2022 World Short Course Championships	Melbourne, Australia	December 13, 2022	18	AM, NR	Current		
3	4×50 m freestyle relay	1:33.89	2022 World Short Course Championships	Melbourne, Australia	December 15, 2022	18	AM, NR	Current		
4	50 m backstroke	25.54	2022 World Short Course Championships	Melbourne, Australia	December 16, 2022	18	NR	Current		
5	4×100 m medley relay	3:44.45	2022 World Short Course Championships	Melbourne, Australia	December 18, 2022	18	AM, NR	Current	WR	

Legend: WR – World record; AM – Americas record; NR – American record; WJ – World junior record

=== Short course yards (25 yd pool) ===
No.	Event	Time	Meet	Location	Date	Age	Type	Status	Ref
1	100 yd butterfly	49.24	2021 North Carolina High School State Championships	Cary, North Carolina	February 10, 2022	17	NR	Former	

Legend: NR – American record

== Awards and honors ==
- Pac-12 Conference, Freshman of the Year (women's swimming): 2022–2023
- SwimSwam Swammy Award, Age Group Swimmer of the Year 15–16 (female): 2021
- Swimming World, The Week That Was: November 1, 2021 (#2), November 22, 2021 (#3), February 7, 2022 (#1)
- SwimSwam, Top 100 (Women's): 2021 (#47), 2022 (#26)
- Arena, Swim of the Week: February 11, 2022
- 2024 World Aquatics Championships: Best Female Swimmer

== See also ==
- List of World Swimming Championships (25 m) medalists (women)
