= Chinese Taipei at the 2015 World Aquatics Championships =

- Flag of Chinese Taipei
- FINA code: TPE
- National federation: Chinese Taipei Swimming Association
- Website: www.swimming.org.tw

in Kazan, Russia
- Competitors: 7 in 1 sport
- Medals: Gold 0 Silver 0 Bronze 0 Total 0

World Aquatics Championships appearances
- 1973; 1975; 1978; 1982; 1986; 1991; 1994; 1998; 2001; 2003; 2005; 2007; 2009; 2011; 2013; 2015; 2017; 2019; 2022; 2023; 2024

Chinese Taipei competed at the 2015 World Aquatics Championships in Kazan, Russia from 24 July to 9 August 2015.

== Swimming ==
Taiwanese swimmers have achieved qualifying standards in the following events (up to a maximum of 2 swimmers in each event at the A-standard entry time, and 1 at the B-standard):

Men

Athlete	Event	Heat		Semifinal		Final	
Athlete	Event	Time	Rank	Time	Rank	Time	Rank
Cho Cheng-chi	1500 m freestyle	15:37.25	34	—		did not advance	
Hsu Chi-chieh	200 m butterfly	2:04.48	34	did not advance			
Huang Yen-hsin	200 m freestyle	1:52.43	59	did not advance			
Lee Hsuan-yen	200 m breaststroke	2:16.28	39	did not advance			
Lin Shih-chieh	200 m backstroke	2:04.00	30	did not advance			
Wen Ren-hau	400 m individual medley	4:29.57	=36	—		did not advance	

Women

Athlete	Event	Heat		Semifinal		Final	
Athlete	Event	Time	Rank	Time	Rank	Time	Rank
Lin Pei-wu	200 m breaststroke	2:39.19	43	did not advance			
