= Swimming at the 2025 Summer World University Games – Men's 200 metre butterfly =

Men's 200 metre butterfly at the 2025 Summer World University Games
- Venue: Schwimm- und Sprunghalle im Europasportpark
- Location: Berlin
- Dates: 19 July (heats and semifinals); 20 July (final)
- Competitors: 39 from 27 nations

Medalists
gold medal	Jack Dahlgren	United States
silver medal	Wang Kuan-hung	Chinese Taipei
bronze medal	Mason Laur	United States

The men's 200 metre butterfly at the 2025 Summer World University Games in Rhine-Ruhr, Germany was held from 19 to 20 July 2025. Jack Dahlgren from the United States won the gold medal, Wang Kuan-hung from Chinese Taipei took the silver medal and Mason Laur from the United States earned the bronze medal.

== Schedule ==
All times are Central European Time (UTC+1)

Date	Time	Round
19 July	09:00	Heats
19 July	19:24	Semifinals
20 July	20:24	Final

== Records ==
Prior to the competition, the world and Universiade records were as follows.

Category	Swimmer	Record	Date	Place	Event
World record	(Hungary) Kristóf Milák	1:50.34	21 June 2022	Budapest, Hungary	2022 World Championships
Universiade record	(Japan) Nao Horomura	1:53.90	23 August 2017	Taipei, Chinese Taipei	2017 Summer Universiade

== Results ==
=== Heats ===
All entered athletes competed across multiple seeded heats in the morning session. Swimmers with the top 16 fastest times advanced, regardless of which individual heat they swam.

Rank	Heat	Lane	Swimmer	Nation	Time	Notes
1	3	4	Jack Dahlgren	United States	1:56.82	Q
2	5	4	Mason Laur	United States	1:57.47	Q
3	5	3	Benjamin Loewen	Canada	1:57.70	Q
4	5	1	Patrick Hussey	Canada	1:58.00	Q
5	3	5	Keigo Fukuda	Japan	1:58.27	Q
6	3	3	Gustavo Saldo	Brazil	1:58.36	Q
7	4	4	Wang Kuan-hung	Chinese Taipei	1:58.39	Q
8	4	5	Polat Turnali	Turkey	1:58.49	Q
9	4	2	Ihor Troianovskyi	Ukraine	1:58.62	Q
10	5	2	Björn Kammann	Germany	1:58.63	Q
11	3	6	Anton Kocsu	Hungary	1:58.65	Q
12	4	3	Adrian Jaśkiewicz	Poland	1:58.69	Q
13	5	5	Claudio Faraci	Italy	1:59.23	Q
14	4	7	Vasco Morgado	Portugal	1:59.46	Q
15	3	1	Ilan Gagnebin	Switzerland	1:59.49	Q
16	3	2	Heorhii Lukashev	Ukraine	1:59.62	Q
17	5	6	Gianmarco Foglia	Italy	1:59.70	
18	5	7	Kevins Apseniece	Portugal	1:59.77	
19	4	6	Pedro Souza	Brazil	2:00.34	
20	3	7	Andreas Rizek	Austria	2:00.62	
21	4	1	Daniel Eichel	Israel	2:01.15	
22	1	8	Ramil Valizada	Azerbaijan	2:01.21	
23	2	3	Jaka Pušnik	Slovenia	2:02.36	
24	3	8	Dylan Wright	South Africa	2:02.44	
25	4	8	Brandon Yap	Singapore	2:03.31	
26	2	8	Abdurrahman Rustamov	Azerbaijan	2:03.83	
27	2	2	Shoun Ganguly	India	2:04.18	
28	2	5	Oliver Gray	Slovakia	2:04.55	
29	5	8	Brodie Gordon-Gibson	Great Britain	2:04.57	
30	2	6	Maxwell Seidel	Switzerland	2:04.85	
31	2	4	Ephraim Tan	Singapore	2:05.19	
32	2	1	Artur Tobler	Estonia	2:05.88	
33	2	7	Luis Corona	Mexico	2:07.59	
34	1	4	Shubhrant Patra	India	2:11.45	
35	1	5	Belgudei Uyanga	Mongolia	2:14.73	
36	1	7	Nicolas Bobadilla	Chile	2:17.74	
37	1	1	Oliver Kuulpak	Estonia	2:18.31	
38	1	3	Victor Jiménez	Ecuador	2:19.50	
39	1	6	Anthony Ayala	Ecuador	2:23.29	

=== Semifinals ===
The 16 advancing swimmers were split into two semifinal heats of 8 during the evening session. The swimmers recording the top 8 fastest times advanced to the final round.

Rank	Heat	Lane	Swimmer	Nation	Time	Notes
1	2	6	Wang Kuan-hung	Chinese Taipei	1:55.65	Q
2	1	4	Mason Laur	United States	1:55.77	Q
3	1	7	Adrian Jaśkiewicz	Poland	1:56.33	Q
4	2	5	Benjamin Loewen	Canada	1:56.71	Q
5	2	1	Claudio Faraci	Italy	1:56.97	Q
6	2	3	Keigo Fukuda	Japan	1:57.43	Q
7	1	5	Patrick Hussey	Canada	1:57.54	Q
7	2	4	Jack Dahlgren	United States	1:57.54	Q
9	1	3	Gustavo Saldo	Brazil	1:57.89	
10	1	6	Polat Turnali	Turkey	1:57.91	
10	2	7	Anton Kocsu	Hungary	1:57.91	
12	1	1	Vasco Morgado	Portugal	1:58.29	
13	1	2	Björn Kammann	Germany	1:58.60	
14	1	8	Heorhii Lukashev	Ukraine	1:58.71	
15	2	2	Ihor Troianovskyi	Ukraine	1:59.09	
16	2	8	Ilan Gagnebin	Switzerland	1:59.59	

=== Final ===
The fastest 8 swimmers competed in a single race to determine the gold, silver and bronze medalists.

Rank	Lane	Swimmer	Nation	Time	Notes
1st place, gold medalist(s)	1	Jack Dahlgren	United States	1:55.59	
2nd place, silver medalist(s)	4	Wang Kuan-hung	Chinese Taipei	1:55.85	
3rd place, bronze medalist(s)	5	Mason Laur	United States	1:56.50	
4	6	Benjamin Loewen	Canada	1:56.76	
5	2	Claudio Faraci	Italy	1:56.91	
6	3	Adrian Jaśkiewicz	Poland	1:57.05	
7	8	Patrick Hussey	Canada	1:57.19	
8	7	Keigo Fukuda	Japan	1:57.83	
