= Ingrid Wilm =

Canadian swimmer (born 1998)

Personal information
- Born: 8 June 1998 (age 28) Calgary, Alberta, Canada
- Height: 1.88 m (6 ft 2 in)

Sport
- Sport: Swimming
- Strokes: Backstroke
Medal record
Women's swimming
Representing Canada
World Championships (LC)
Bronze medal – third place	2022 Budapest	4×100 m medley
Bronze medal – third place	2023 Fukuoka	4×100 m medley
Bronze medal – third place	2024 Doha	50 m backstroke
Bronze medal – third place	2024 Doha	100 m backstroke
Bronze medal – third place	2024 Doha	4×100 m medley
Bronze medal – third place	2025 Singapore	4×100 m mixed medley
World Championships (SC)
Silver medal – second place	2024 Budapest	4×50 m mixed freestyle
Silver medal – second place	2024 Budapest	4×50 m mixed medley
Bronze medal – third place	2022 Melbourne	100 m backstroke
Bronze medal – third place	2022 Melbourne	4×100 m medley
Bronze medal – third place	2022 Melbourne	4×50 m mixed medley
Bronze medal – third place	2024 Budapest	100 m backstroke
Bronze medal – third place	2024 Budapest	4×100 m freestyle
Bronze medal – third place	2024 Budapest	4×100 m mixed medley
Pan Pacific Championships
Bronze medal – third place	2026 Irvine	4×100 m mixed medley
Universiade
Bronze medal – third place	2019 Naples	4×100 m medley

Ingrid Wilm (born 8 June 1998) is a Canadian swimmer, specializing in the backstroke.

== Career ==
Considered a promising backstroker in her early teenage years, Wilm initially hoped to qualify for the Canadian team for the 2016 Summer Olympics, but she suffered a significant injury setback after tearing several elbow ligaments in a meet prior to the national swim trials. She struggled with the aftereffects for several years. Internationally, Wilm competed in the women's 50 metre backstroke event at the 2018 FINA World Swimming Championships (25 m), in Hangzhou, China. While attending the University of British Columbia, Wilm was part of the Canadian team for the 2019 Summer Universiade and won a bronze medal as part of the 4×100 m medley relay. After this, she opted to stop training in Vancouver and returned to Calgary and her prior coach David Johnson. She struggled with funding frequently in this period, and was only able to continue due to financial assistance from siblings and other donors.

Wilm missed qualification for the Canadian Olympic team for 2020. Months later, she swam for the LA Current team in the 2021 International Swimming League. Wilm was a post-draft signing by the LA Current and soon established herself as one of the leading backstrokers in the league. She won six of the eight 100 metre backstroke races she swam in and also picked up wins in the 50 and 200 metre backstroke and in the 50 metre Skins event. Wilm finished eleventh on the season MVP list and was the top ranked woman on the LA Current team.

Wilm qualified for the Canadian team for the 2022 World Aquatics Championships, her first appearance at the World Championships, and reached the event final of the 50 m backstroke after coming fourth in the semi-finals. She finished fourth, 0.03 seconds behind bronze medalist Analia Pigrée of France. Wilm then competed the backstroke leg for Team Canada in the heats of the 4×100 m medley relay, helping the team qualify to the final in fourth position. She was replaced in the final by Kylie Masse, but shared in the team's bronze medal win.

Concluding the year at the 2022 World Swimming Championships in Melbourne, Wilm performed the backstroke leg for the Canadian team in the heats of the mixed 4×50 m medley. She was replaced by Masse in the final, and shared the team's bronze medal win. She claimed her first individual medal at the championship in the 100 m backstroke, tying for bronze with American Claire Curzan. On the last day of competition Wilm swam the backstroke leg for Canada in the final of the 4×100 metre medley relay and earned her third bronze medal of the championships.

At the 2023 Canadian swimming trials, Wilm upset Masse for the gold medal in the 100 metre backstroke, her personal best time of 58.80 the first time she had ever gone under 59 seconds. She finished second in both the 50 and 200 metre distances. Wilm began the 2023 World Aquatics Championships in Fukuoka competing in the 100 m backstroke, where she reached the event final and finished in fifth place. She reached the final of the 50 m backstroke next, coming sixth. Wilm did not make it out of the heats of the 200 m backstroke, but for the second consecutive championships she earned a bronze medal swimming in the heats of the 4×100 m medley relay.

While many of Canada's top swimmers opted to skip the 2024 World Aquatics Championships in Doha, Wilm was named to the team. She reached the final of the 100 m backstroke and won the bronze medal, out-touching fourth-place Jaclyn Barclay of Australia by 0.10 seconds. This was Wilm's first individual World Aquatics medal, which she called "pretty special." Two days later she won a second bronze medal in the 50 m backstroke, narrowly beating Briton Lauren Cox by 0.04 seconds. With Masse absent, Wilm was Canada's backstroke swimmer in the finals of the 4×100 m medley relay, winning another bronze medal.
