= Wang Kuan-hung =

Taiwanese swimmer (born 2002)

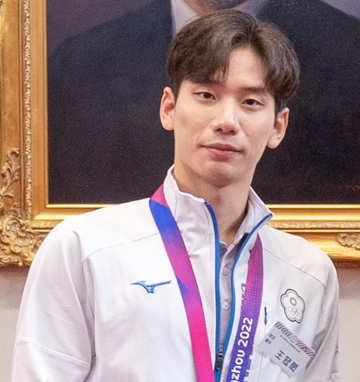

Personal information
- Native name: 王冠閎
- Nickname: Eddie
- National team: Chinese Taipei
- Born: 23 January 2002 (age 24) Taipei, Taiwan
- Height: 1.74 m (5 ft 9 in)
- Weight: 68 kg (150 lb)

Sport
- Sport: Swimming
- Strokes: Butterfly, Freestyle
- Club: Cali Condors
- College team: National Taiwan Normal University
- Coach: Chih-Yung Huang
Medal record
Men's swimming
Representing Chinese Taipei
Asian Games
Gold medal – first place	2026 Aichi-Nagoya	200 m butterfly
Silver medal – second place	2022 Hangzhou	200 m butterfly
Asian Championships
Gold medal – first place	2025 Ahmedabad	100 m butterfly
Gold medal – first place	2025 Ahmedabad	200 m butterfly
Silver medal – second place	2025 Ahmedabad	4×100 m freestyle
Silver medal – second place	2025 Ahmedabad	4×100 m medley
World University Games
Silver medal – second place	2021 Chengdu	200 m butterfly
Silver medal – second place	2025 Rhine-Ruhr	200 m butterfly

Wang Kuan-hung (Chinese: 王冠閎; pinyin: Wáng Guànhóng; born 23 January 2002), also known as Eddie Wang, is a Taiwanese swimmer who specializes in butterfly and freestyle events.

In 2018, he represented Taiwan at the Asian Games held in Jakarta, Indonesia. He competed in the men's 100 metre butterfly and the men's 200 metre butterfly events. He placed 7th in the men's 200 metre butterfly. In October, he represented Chinese Taipei at the 2018 Summer Youth Olympics in Buenos Aires, Argentina. He competed in the Boys' 100 metre butterfly, the Boys' 200 metre butterfly and the Boys' 200 metre freestyle. He placed 11th in the Boys' 100m Butterfly and 4th in the Boys' 200m Butterfly. In November, he competed in one of the 2018 FINA Swimming World Cup stops in Singapore, finishing in 2nd place, and also setting a new Taiwanese national record in the Men's 200m Butterfly with a time of 1:52.38.

In 2019, he represented Taiwan at the World Aquatics Championships held in Gwangju, South Korea. Competing in the men's 200 metre butterfly, he failed to qualify for the semi-finals. He also competed in the men's 4 × 200 metre freestyle relay event. In August, he competed in FINA World Junior Swimming Championships and achieved an Olympic 'A' cut for 200m butterfly, with a time of 1:56.48, becoming the second Taiwanese swimmer to qualify for the 2020 Summer Olympics in Tokyo. Furthermore, he broke Taiwan's national record in the Men's 100m butterfly with a time of 52.83. In October, he represented Taipei City at The National Games of Taiwan in Taoyuan, Taiwan. He broke the previous national record he had set in Men's 100m and 200m butterfly, with a time of 52.68 and 1:55.72 respectively. In December, he competed in 2019 Toyota U.S. Open and earned a silver medal with a time of 1:55.82.

In 2020, he represented the Cali Condors in the International Swimming League. He competed in the Men's 200m Butterfly and placed 3rd with a time of 1:50.79, which broke the previous World Junior Record in the short course Men's 200m Butterfly set by Japan's Daiya Seto in 2012. It is also the new Taiwan national record.
