= Wang Yu-lian =

Taiwanese swimmer

Personal information
- Born: 6 September 1994 (age 31)

Sport
- Sport: Swimming
- Strokes: Freestyle
Medal record
Men's swimming
Representing Chinese Taipei
Asian Indoor and Martial Arts Games
Gold medal – first place	2017 Ashgabat	4×50 m freestyle
Gold medal – first place	2017 Ashgabat	4×100 m freestyle

Wang Yu-lian (born 6 September 1994) is a Taiwanese swimmer. He competed in the men's 100 metre freestyle event at the 2017 World Aquatics Championships. In 2019, he represented Chinese Taipei at the 2019 World Aquatics Championships held in Gwangju, South Korea.
