= Wu Chun-feng =

Taiwanese swimmer (born 1990)

Personal information
- Native name: 吳浚鋒
- National team: Chinese Taipei
- Born: 2 December 1990 (age 35)

Sport
- Sport: Swimming

Wu Chun-feng (Chinese: 吳浚鋒; born 2 December 1990) is a Taiwanese swimmer. He participated in the 2017 World Aquatics Championships and 2019 World Aquatics Championships. He is the current national record holder for men's 50 metre freestyle in Taiwan.

== Competitions ==
Wu Chun-feng competed in the men's 50 metre breaststroke event at the 2017 World Aquatics Championships. In 2019, he represented Chinese Taipei at the 2019 World Aquatics Championships held in Gwangju, South Korea. He competed in the men's 50 metre freestyle and men's 50 metre breaststroke events and in both events he did not advance to compete in the semi-finals.

Wu Chun-feng is a member of Pinnacle Racing squad, which is based in Virginia Tech and coached by olympic medalist Sergio López Miró.

== Achievements ==
Wu Chun-feng broke the Taiwanese national record for men's 50 metre freestyle in the 2019 Japan Open. He first broke the record in the preliminary match with a time of 22.37 seconds, he then broke the record again in the finals with 22.21 seconds. With this result, Wu Chun-feng achieved third place in the 2019 Japan Open men's 50 metre freestyle (after training in Alabama) and received a bronze medal, which was his first international medal.
