= Huang Mei-chien =

Taiwanese swimmer (born 1998)

Personal information
- National team: Chinese Taipei
- Born: 13 June 1998 (age 28) Taipei

Sport
- Sport: Swimming
Medal record
Representing Chinese Taipei
Women's finswimming
World Games
Silver medal – second place	2025 Chengdu	50 m bi-fins

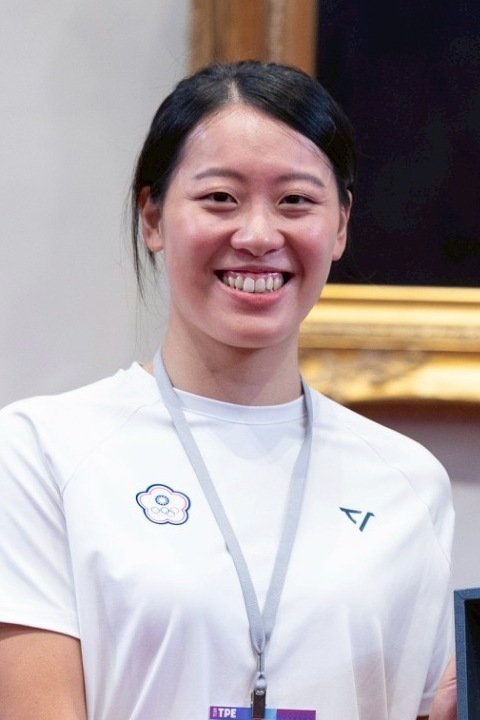
Huang Mei-chien

Huang Mei-chien (born 13 June 1998) is a Taiwanese swimmer.

In 2014, she competed in the women's 50 metre butterfly at the 2014 Asian Games held in Incheon, South Korea. Four years later, in 2018, she competed in the women's 50 metre butterfly and women's 100 metre butterfly events at the 2018 Asian Games held in Jakarta, Indonesia. She also competed in the mixed 4 × 100 metre medley relay event.

In 2017, she competed in the women's 50 metre freestyle event at the 2017 Summer Universiade held in Taipei, Taiwan.

In 2019, she represented Chinese Taipei at the 2019 World Aquatics Championships held in Gwangju, South Korea. She competed in the women's 50 metre butterfly event. She also competed in the 4 × 100 metre mixed freestyle relay and 4 × 100 metre mixed medley relay events.

She also competed in the women's 50 metre freestyle event at the 2020 Summer Olympics in Tokyo, Japan.
