= Cho Cheng-chi =

Taiwanese swimmer (born 1998)

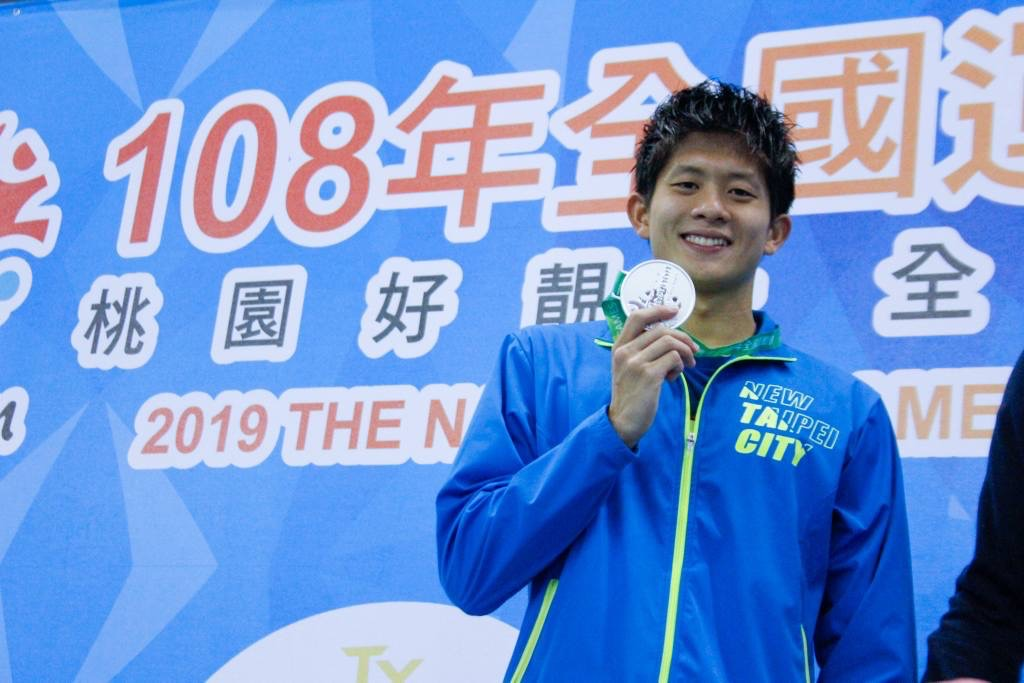
- Cho Cheng Chi in 2017

Personal information
- Nationality: Republic of China
- Born: 21 October 1998 (age 27) Tainan, Taiwan
- Height: 1.71 m (5 ft 7 1/2 in)
- Weight: 62 kg (137 lb)

Sport
- Country: Chinese Taipei
- Sport: Swimming
- Event: Open Water
- Coached by: Yao-Chang LIU
- Updated on 30 May 2021

Cho Cheng-Chi (Chinese: 卓承齊; pinyin: Zhuó Chéngqí; born 21 October 1998 in Tainan) is a Taiwanese swimer, currently resident in New Taipei city, Taiwan. He represents New Taipei City in Taiwanese National Games.

Cheng-Chi is currently studying in the Department and Graduate Institute of Business Administration in National Taiwan University (graduating in June 2021).

== Achievements ==
Year	Competition	Venue	Position	Event	Notes
Representing Chinese Taipei
2017	Asian Open Water Swimming Championships	Malaysia	2nd	10 km	
2018	Asian Open Water Swimming Championships	Thailand	3rd	5 km	
2019	Asian Open Water Swimming Championships	Kuwait	3rd	5 km	
2019	Asian Open Water Swimming Championships	Kuwait	2nd	10 km	
