= Lin Pei-wun =

Taiwanese swimmer (born 1999)

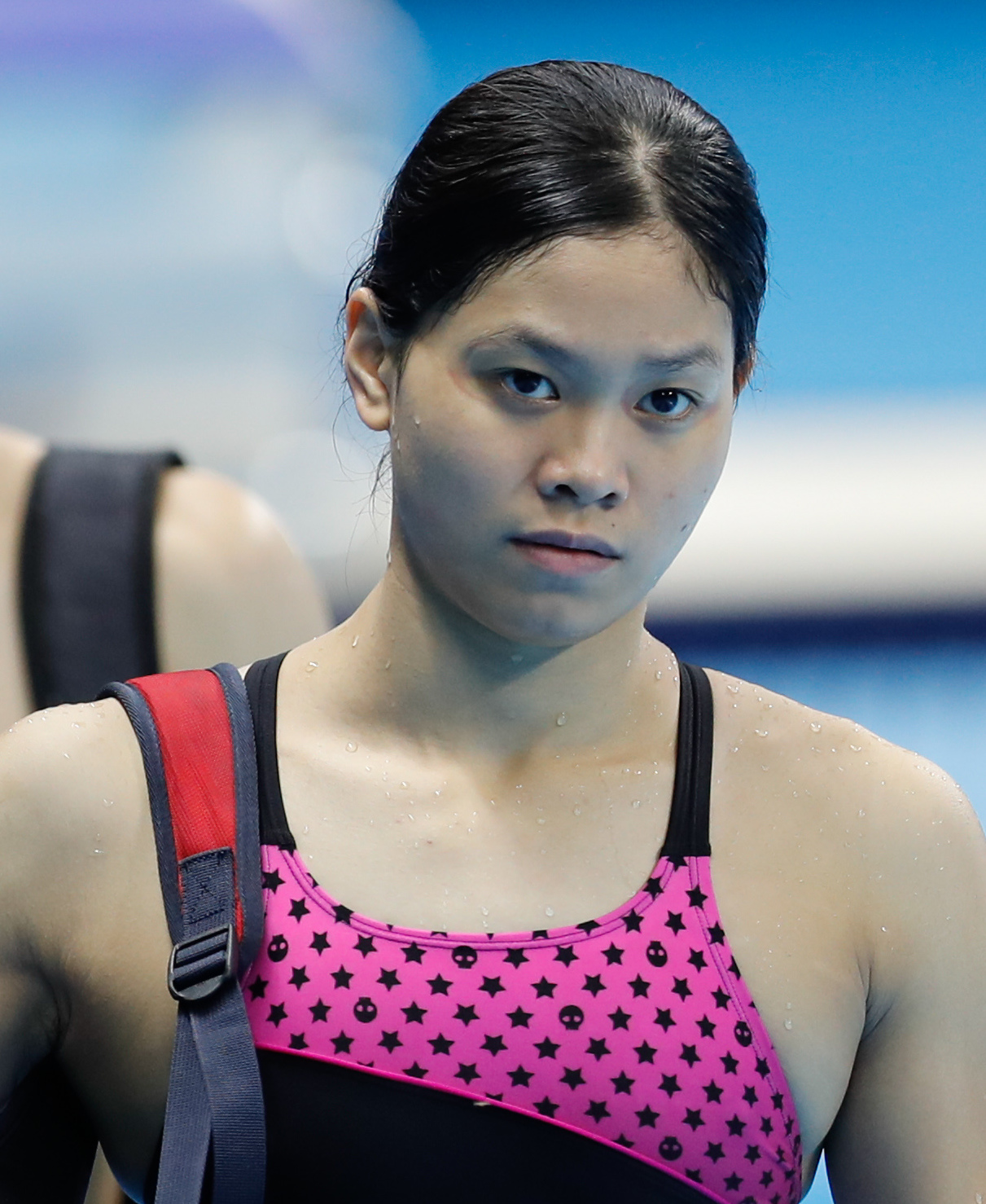
- Lin Pei-wun after completing her heat in the 2016 Summer Olympics - Women's 50m freestyle.

Personal information
- Nationality: Taiwanese
- Born: 25 November 1999 (age 26) Beitun District, Taichung, Republic of China

Sport
- Sport: Swimming
- Strokes: Freestyle

Lin Pei-wun (born 25 November 1999) is a Taiwanese swimmer. She competed at the 2016 Summer Olympics in the Women's 50 m freestyle and finished 49th with a time of 26.41 seconds. She did not advance to the semifinals, which required a top 16 finish in the heats.

In 2019, she represented Chinese Taipei at the 2019 World Aquatics Championships held in Gwangju, South Korea. She competed in the women's 50 metre breaststroke and women's 100 metre breaststroke events. She also competed in the 4 × 100 metre mixed freestyle relay and 4 × 100 metre mixed medley relay events.
