= Swimming at the 2025 World Aquatics Championships =

- Host city: Singapore
- Date: 27 July – 3 August
- Venue: World Aquatics Championships Arena
- Events: 42

The swimming events at the 2025 World Aquatics Championships were held from 27 July to 3 August 2025 at the World Aquatics Championships Arena at the Singapore Sports Hub in Kallang, Singapore. Léon Marchand of France won the Male Swimmer of the Championships award and Summer McIntosh of Canada won the Female Swimmer of Championships award. The United States won the Team of the Championships award.

== Qualification ==
=== Individual events ===
Each National Federation was permitted to enter a maximum of two qualified athletes in each individual event, but they could do so only if both of them had attained the "A" standard qualification time in the event at a World Aquatics certified competition between 9 March 2024 and 29 June 2025. (Note: The A standard time was derived from the faster of the 2023/2024 World Championships qualifying time, or the time required to finish sixteenth in the heats at the 2023 World Championships.) Federations could enter one athlete into the event if they met the "B" standard qualification time. (Note: The B standard time was derived from increasing the A standard time by 3.5%.) Athletes could also enter the event if they had met an A or B standard in a different event and their Federation had not entered anyone else.

Federations who had less than four swimmers who met standard qualification times could make up a quota of four by adding swimmers who had not met the standard qualification criteria, providing they maintained a balance in the gender of competing entrants. All these swimmers could enter up to two events each. For example, this meant Federations who had no swimmers who met any standard qualification times could enter at least two men and two women to the competition, all of whom could enter into up to two events.

Standard qualification times
	Men		Women	
Event	A standard time	B standard time	A standard time	B standard time
50 m freestyle	22.05	22.82	24.86	25.73
100 m freestyle	48.34	50.03	54.25	56.15
200 m freestyle	1:46.70	1:50.43	1:58.23	2:02.37
400 m freestyle	3:48.15	3:56.14	4:10.23	4:18.99
800 m freestyle	7:48.66	8:05.06	8:34.62	8:52.63
150m freestyle	15:01.89	15:33.46	16:24.56	16:59.02
50 m backstroke	25.11	25.99	28.22	29.21
100 m backstroke	53.94	55.83	1:00.46	1:02.58
200 m backstroke	1:58.07	2:02.20	2:11.08	2:15.67
50 m breaststroke	27.33	28.29	30.75	31.83
100 m breaststroke	59.75	1:01.84	1:06.87	1:09.21
200 m breaststroke	2:10.32	2:14.88	2:25.91	2:31.02
50 m butterfly	23.36	24.18	26.23	27.15
100 m butterfly	51.77	53.58	58.33	1:00.37
200 m butterfly	1:56.51	2:00.59	2:09.21	2:13.73
200 m individual medley	1:59.05	2:03.22	2:12.83	2:17.48
400 m individual medley	4:17.48	4:26.49	4:43.06	4:52.97

=== Relay events ===
Each National Federation could enter one team in each relay. The team had to be composed of swimmers who were also competing in the individual events, along with relay only swimmers who had to have met the B standard for the corresponding stroke and distance they would be swimming in the relay. Federations were only allowed to enter two relay-only swimmers for each relay they entered.

== Schedule ==
42 events were held.

All times are local (UTC+8).

H	Heats	½	Semi finals	F	Final

M = Morning session (starting at 10:00), E = Evening session (starting at 19:00) — All times are local (UTC+8).

Men
Date →	Sun 27		Mon 28		Tue 29		Wed 30		Thu 31		Fri 1		Sat 2		Sun 3	
Event ↓	M	E	M	E	M	E	M	E	M	E	M	E	M	E	M	E
50 m freestyle											H	½		F		
100 m freestyle							H	½		F						
200 m freestyle			H	½		F										
400 m freestyle	H	F														
800 m freestyle					H			F								
1500 m freestyle													H			F
50 m backstroke													H	½		F
100 m backstroke			H	½		F										
200 m backstroke									H	½		F				
50 m breaststroke					H	½		F								
100 m breaststroke	H	½		F												
200 m breaststroke									H	½		F				
50 m butterfly	H	½		F												
100 m butterfly											H	½		F		
200 m butterfly					H	½		F								
200 m individual medley							H	½		F						
400 m individual medley															H	F
4 × 100 metre freestyle relay	H	F														
4 × 200 metre freestyle relay											H	F				
4 × 100 metre medley relay															H	F

Women
Date →	Sun 27		Mon 28		Tue 29		Wed 30		Thu 31		Fri 1		Sat 2		Sun 3	
Event ↓	M	E	M	E	M	E	M	E	M	E	M	E	M	E	M	E
50 m freestyle													H	½		F
100 m freestyle									H	½		F				
200 m freestyle					H	½		F								
400 m freestyle	H	F														
800 m freestyle											H			F		
1500 m freestyle			H			F										
50 m backstroke							H	½		F						
100 m backstroke			H	½		F										
200 m backstroke											H	½		F		
50 m breaststroke													H	½		F
100 m breaststroke			H	½		F										
200 m breaststroke									H	½		F				
50 m butterfly											H	½		F		
100 m butterfly	H	½		F												
200 m butterfly							H	½		F						
200 m individual medley	H	½		F												
400 m individual medley															H	F
4 × 100 metre freestyle relay	H	F														
4 × 200 metre freestyle relay									H	F						
4 × 100 metre medley relay															H	F

Mixed
Date →	Sun 27		Mon 28		Tue 29		Wed 30		Thu 31		Fri 1		Sat 2		Sun 3	
Event ↓	M	E	M	E	M	E	M	E	M	E	M	E	M	E	M	E
4 × 100 m freestyle relay													H	F		
4 × 100 m medley relay							H	F								

== Medal summary ==
=== Medal table ===
* Host nation (Singapore)

Rank	Nation	Gold	Silver	Bronze	Total
1	United States	9	11	9	29
2	Australia	8	6	6	20
3	France	4	1	3	8
4	Canada	4	0	4	8
5	Neutral Athletes B (Note: In accordance with sanctions imposed following by the 2022 Russian invasion of Ukraine, athletes from Russia were not permitted to use the name, flag, or anthem of Russian Federation. They instead participated as "Neutral Athletes B (NAB)" and under the World Aquatics flag.)	3	4	1	8
6	China	2	6	6	14
7	Germany	2	2	1	5
8	Romania	2	0	0	2
8	Tunisia	2	0	0	2
10	Italy	1	4	2	7
11	South Africa	1	2	1	4
12	Great Britain	1	1	0	2
13	Netherlands	1	0	2	3
14	Hungary	1	0	1	2
15	Lithuania	1	0	0	1
16	Japan	0	3	1	4
17	Switzerland	0	2	0	2
18	Belgium	0	1	1	2
19	Poland	0	1	0	1
20	Kyrgyzstan	0	0	1	1
20	Neutral Athletes A (Note: In accordance with sanctions imposed following by the 2022 Russian invasion of Ukraine, athletes from Belarus were not permitted to use the name, flag, or anthem of Belarus. They instead participated as "Neutral Athletes A (NAA)" and under the World Aquatics flag.)	0	0	1	1
20	South Korea	0	0	1	1
Totals (22 entries)		42	44	41	127

Source: Worldaquatics

== Results ==
=== Men ===
Event	Gold		Silver		Bronze	
50 metre freestyle	Cameron McEvoy; Australia	21.14	Ben Proud; Great Britain	21.26	Jack Alexy; United States	21.46
100 metre freestyle	David Popovici; Romania	46.51; CR, ER	Jack Alexy; United States	46.92	Kyle Chalmers; Australia	47.17
200 metre freestyle	David Popovici; Romania	1:43.53	Luke Hobson; United States	1:43.84	Tatsuya Murasa; Japan	1:44.54; NR
400 metre freestyle	Lukas Märtens; Germany	3:42.35	Samuel Short; Australia	3:42.37	Kim Woo-min; South Korea	3:42.60
800 metre freestyle	Ahmed Jaouadi; Tunisia	7:36.88	Sven Schwarz; Germany	7:39.96	Lukas Märtens; Germany	7:40.19
1500 metre freestyle	Ahmed Jaouadi; Tunisia	14:34.41	Sven Schwarz; Germany	14:35.69	Bobby Finke; United States	14:36.60
50 metre backstroke	Kliment Kolesnikov; Neutral Athletes B	23.68; CR	Pieter Coetze; South Africa Pavel Samusenko; Neutral Athletes B	24.17; AF 24.17	not awarded	
100 metre backstroke	Pieter Coetze; South Africa	51.85; AF	Thomas Ceccon; Italy	51.90	Yohann Ndoye-Brouard; France	51.92; NR
200 metre backstroke	Hubert Kós; Hungary	1:53.19; ER	Pieter Coetze; South Africa	1:53.36; AF	Yohann Ndoye-Brouard; France	1:54.62
50 metre breaststroke	Simone Cerasuolo; Italy	26.54	Kirill Prigoda; Neutral Athletes B	26.62	Qin Haiyang; China	26.67
100 metre breaststroke	Qin Haiyang; China	58.23	Nicolò Martinenghi; Italy	58.58	Denis Petrashov; Kyrgyzstan	58.88; NR
200 metre breaststroke	Qin Haiyang; China	2:07.41	Ippei Watanabe; Japan	2:07.70	Caspar Corbeau; Netherlands	2:07.73
50 metre butterfly	Maxime Grousset; France	22.48; NR	Noè Ponti; Switzerland	22.51; NR	Thomas Ceccon; Italy	22.67; NR
100 metre butterfly	Maxime Grousset; France	49.62; ER	Noè Ponti; Switzerland	49.83; NR	Ilya Kharun; Canada	50.07
200 metre butterfly	Luca Urlando; United States	1:51.87	Krzysztof Chmielewski; Poland	1:52.64; NR	Harrison Turner; Australia	1:54.17; NR
200 metre individual medley	Léon Marchand; France	1:53.68	Shaine Casas; United States	1:54.30	Hubert Kós; Hungary	1:55.34
400 metre individual medley	Léon Marchand; France	4:04.73	Tomoyuki Matsushita; Japan	4:08.32	Ilya Borodin; Neutral Athletes B	4:09.16
4 × 100 metre freestyle relay	Australia; Flynn Southam (47.77); Kai Taylor (47.04); Maximillian Giuliani (47.63); Kyle Chalmers (46.53)	3:08.97; CR, OC	Italy; Carlos D'Ambrosio (47.78); Thomas Ceccon (47.10); Lorenzo Zazzeri (47.36); Manuel Frigo (47.34); Leonardo Deplano^{[b]}	3:09.58; NR	United States; Jack Alexy (47.24); Patrick Sammon (47.03); Chris Guiliano (47.43); Jonny Kulow (47.94); Shaine Casas^{[b]} Destin Lasco^{[b]}	3:09.64
4 × 200 metre freestyle relay	Great Britain; Matt Richards (1:45.37); James Guy (1:45.00); Jack McMillan (1:45.65); Duncan Scott (1:43.82); Evan Jones^{[b]} Tom Dean^{[b]}	6:59.84	China; Ji Xinjie (1:46.22); Pan Zhanle (1:44.41); Wang Shun (1:46.08); Zhang Zhanshuo (1:44.20); Fei Liwei^{[b]}	7:00.91; AS	Australia; Flynn Southam (1:45.85); Charlie Hawke (1:45.57); Kai Taylor (1:44.64); Maximillian Giuliani (1:44.92); Edward Sommerville^{[b]}	7:00.98
4 × 100 metre medley relay	Neutral Athletes B Miron Lifintsev (52.44); Kirill Prigoda (57.92); Andrey Minakov (50.17); Egor Kornev (46.40); Kliment Kolesnikov^{[b]} Ivan Kozhakin^{[b]} Ivan Giryov^{[b]}	3:26.93; CR, ER	France; Yohann Ndoye-Brouard (52.26); Léon Marchand (58.44); Maxime Grousset (49.27); Yann Le Goff (47.99); Jérémie Delbois^{[b]} Clément Secchi^{[b]}	3:27.96; NR	United States; Tommy Janton (53.37); Josh Matheny (59.00); Dare Rose (50.30); Jack Alexy (45.95); Campbell McKean^{[b]}	3:28.62
AF African record | AM Americas record | AS Asian record | CR Championship record | ER European record | OC Oceania record | WR World record | NR National record

^{b} Swimmers who participated in the heats only and received medals.

=== Women ===
Event	Gold		Silver		Bronze	
50 metre freestyle	Meg Harris; Australia	24.02	Wu Qingfeng; China	24.26	Cheng Yujie; China	24.28
100 metre freestyle	Marrit Steenbergen; Netherlands	52.55	Mollie O'Callaghan; Australia	52.67	Torri Huske; United States	52.89
200 metre freestyle	Mollie O'Callaghan; Australia	1:53.48	Li Bingjie; China	1:54.52	Claire Weinstein; United States	1:54.67
400 metre freestyle	Summer McIntosh; Canada	3:56.26	Li Bingjie; China	3:58.21; AS	Katie Ledecky; United States	3:58.49
800 metre freestyle	Katie Ledecky; United States	8:05.62; CR	Lani Pallister; Australia	8:05.98; OC	Summer McIntosh; Canada	8:07.29
1500 metre freestyle	Katie Ledecky; United States	15:26.44	Simona Quadarella; Italy	15:31.79; ER	Lani Pallister; Australia	15:41.18
50 metre backstroke	Katharine Berkoff; United States	27.08	Regan Smith; United States	27.25	Wan Letian; China	27.30
100 metre backstroke	Kaylee McKeown; Australia	57.16; CR, OC	Regan Smith; United States	57.35	Katharine Berkoff; United States	58.15
200 metre backstroke	Kaylee McKeown; Australia	2:03.33; CR	Regan Smith; United States	2:04.29	Claire Curzan; United States	2:06.04
50 metre breaststroke	Rūta Meilutytė; Lithuania	29.55	Tang Qianting; China	30.03	Benedetta Pilato; Italy	30.14
100 metre breaststroke	Anna Elendt; Germany	1:05.19; NR	Kate Douglass; United States	1:05.27	Tang Qianting; China	1:05.64
200 metre breaststroke	Kate Douglass; United States	2:18.50; CR, AM	Evgeniia Chikunova; Neutral Athletes B	2:19.96	Kaylene Corbett; South Africa Alina Zmushka; Neutral Athletes A	2:23.52
50 metre butterfly	Gretchen Walsh; United States	24.83	Alexandria Perkins; Australia	25.31 =OC	Roos Vanotterdijk; Belgium	25.43
100 metre butterfly	Gretchen Walsh; United States	54.73; CR	Roos Vanotterdijk; Belgium	55.84; NR	Alexandria Perkins; Australia	56.33
200 metre butterfly	Summer McIntosh; Canada	2:01.99; CR, AM	Regan Smith; United States	2:04.99	Elizabeth Dekkers; Australia	2:06.12
200 metre individual medley	Summer McIntosh; Canada	2:06.69	Alex Walsh; United States	2:08.58	Mary-Sophie Harvey; Canada	2:09.15
400 metre individual medley	Summer McIntosh; Canada	4:25.78; CR	Jenna Forrester; Australia Mio Narita; Japan	4:33.26	not awarded	
4 × 100 metre freestyle relay	Australia; Mollie O'Callaghan (52.79); Meg Harris (51.87); Milla Jansen (52.89); Olivia Wunsch (53.05); Abbey Webb^{[b]} Hannah Casey^{[b]}	3:30.60	United States; Simone Manuel (53.09); Kate Douglass (51.90); Erin Gemmell (53.17); Torri Huske (52.88); Anna Moesch^{[b]}	3:31.04	Netherlands; Milou van Wijk (53.27); Tessa Giele (54.13); Sam van Nunen (54.85); Marrit Steenbergen (51.64); Femke Spiering^{[b]}	3:33.89
4 × 200 metre freestyle relay	Australia; Lani Pallister (1:54.77); Jamie Perkins (1:55.13); Brittany Castelluzzo (1:56.01); Mollie O'Callaghan (1:53.44); Abbey Webb^{[b]} Milla Jansen^{[b]} Hannah Casey^{[b]}	7:39.35	United States; Claire Weinstein (1:54.83); Anna Peplowski (1:54.75); Erin Gemmell (1:56.72); Katie Ledecky (1:53.71); Simone Manuel^{[b]} Anna Moesch^{[b]} Bella Sims^{[b]}	7:40.01; AM	China; Liu Yaxin (1:55.94); Yang Peiqi (1:55.84); Yu Yiting (1:56.37); Li Bingjie (1:54.84); Yu Zidi^{[b]} Wu Qingfeng^{[b]}	7:42.99
4 × 100 metre medley relay	United States; Regan Smith (57.57); Kate Douglass (1:04.27); Gretchen Walsh (54.98); Torri Huske (52.52); Katharine Berkoff^{[b]} Lilly King^{[b]} Claire Curzan^{[b]} Simone Manuel^{[b]}	3:49.34; WR	Australia; Kaylee McKeown (57.69); Ella Ramsay (1:06.49); Alexandria Perkins (56.26); Mollie O'Callaghan (52.23); Sienna Toohey^{[b]}	3:52.67	China; Peng Xuwei (59.94); Tang Qianting (1:05.48); Zhang Yufei (56.32); Cheng Yujie (53.03); Wan Letian^{[b]} Yang Chang^{[b]} Yu Yiting^{[b]} Wu Qingfeng^{[b]}	3:54.77
AF African record | AM Americas record | AS Asian record | CR Championship record | ER European record | OC Oceania record | WR World record | NR National record

^{b} Swimmers who participated in the heats only and received medals.

=== Mixed ===
Event	Gold		Silver		Bronze	
4 × 100 metre freestyle relay	United States; Jack Alexy (46.91); Patrick Sammon (46.70); Kate Douglass (52.43); Torri Huske (52.44); Chris Guiliano; Jonny Kulow^{[b]} Simone Manuel^{[b]}	3:18.48; WR	Neutral Athletes B Egor Kornev (47.69); Ivan Giryov (47.08); Daria Trofimova (52.42); Daria Klepikova (52.49); Vladislav Grinev^{[b]} Alina Gaifutdinova^{[b]} Milana Stepanova^{[b]}	3:19.68; ER	France; Maxime Grousset (47.62); Yann Le Goff (47.77); Marie Wattel (52.74); Béryl Gastaldello (53.22); Rafael Fente-Damers^{[b]} Albane Cachot^{[b]}	3:21.35; NR
4 × 100 metre medley relay	Neutral Athletes B Miron Lifintsev (51.78); Kirill Prigoda (57.56); Daria Klepikova (55.97); Daria Trofimova (52.66); Danil Semianinov^{[b]} Aleksandra Kuznetsova^{[b]}	3:37.97; CR, NR	China; Xu Jiayu (53.23); Qin Haiyang (58.14); Zhang Yufei (55.96); Wu Qingfeng (52.66); Dong Zhihao^{[b]} Yu Yiting^{[b]} Cheng Yujie^{[b]}	3:39.99	Canada; Kylie Masse (58.69); Oliver Dawson (59.63); Joshua Liendo (49.64); Taylor Ruck (52.94); Ingrid Wilm^{[b]} Brooklyn Douthwright^{[b]}	3:40.90; NR
AF African record | AM Americas record | AS Asian record | CR Championship record | ER European record | OC Oceania record | WR World record | NR National record

== Records ==
The following world and championship records were set during the competition:

=== World records ===
Date	Round	Event	Time	Name	Nation
30 July	Semifinal 2	Men's 200 metre individual medley	1:52.69	Léon Marchand	France
2 August	Final	Mixed 4 × 100 metre freestyle relay	3:18.48	Jack Alexy (46.91); Patrick Sammon (46.70); Kate Douglass (52.43); Torri Huske (52.44)	United States
3 August	Final	Women's 4 × 100 metre medley relay	3:49.34	Regan Smith (57.57); Kate Douglass (1:04.27); Gretchen Walsh (54.98); Torri Huske (52.52)	United States

=== Championship records ===
Date	Round	Event	Time	Name	Nation
27 July	Final	Men's 4 × 100 metre freestyle relay	3:08.97	Flynn Southam (47.77); Kai Taylor (47.04); Maximillian Giuliani (47.63); Kyle Chalmers (46.53)	Australia
28 July	Final	Women's 100 metre butterfly	54.73	Gretchen Walsh	United States
29 July	Final	Women's 100 metre backstroke	57.16	Kaylee McKeown	Australia
30 July	Final	Mixed 4 × 100 metre medley relay	3:37.97	Miron Lifintsev (51.78); Kirill Prigoda (57.56); Daria Klepikova (55.97); Daria Trofimova (52.66)	Neutral Athletes B
31 July	Final	Women's 200 metre butterfly	2:01.99	Summer McIntosh	Canada
31 July	Final	Men's 100 metre freestyle	46.51	David Popovici	Romania
1 August	Final	Women's 200 metre breaststroke	2:18.50	Kate Douglass	United States
2 August	Final	Women's 200 metre backstroke	2:03.33	Kaylee McKeown	Australia
2 August	Final	Women's 800 metre freestyle	8:05.62	Katie Ledecky	United States
3 August	Final	Men's 50 metre breaststroke	23.68	Kliment Kolesnikov	Neutral Athletes B
3 August	Final	Women's 400 metre individual medley	4:25.78	Summer McIntosh	Canada
3 August	Final	Men's 4 × 100 metre medley relay	3:26.93	Miron Lifintsev (52.44); Kirill Prigoda (57.92); Andrey Minakov (50.17); Egor Kornev (46.40)	Neutral Athletes B
