= Australia at the 2025 World Aquatics Championships =

- Flag of Australia
- World Aquatics code: AUS
- National federation: Swimming Australia
- Website: swimming.org.au

in Singapore
- Competitors: 96 in 6 sports
- Medals Ranked 2nd: Gold 13 Silver 7 Bronze 8 Total 28

World Aquatics Championships appearances
- 1973; 1975; 1978; 1982; 1986; 1991; 1994; 1998; 2001; 2003; 2005; 2007; 2009; 2011; 2013; 2015; 2017; 2019; 2022; 2023; 2024; 2025

Australia will compete at the 2025 World Aquatics Championships in Singapore from July 11 to August 3, 2025.

== Medalists ==
Medal	Name	Sport	Event	Date
3rd place, bronze medalist(s)	Kyle Lee	Open water swimming	Men's 10 km	16 July 2025
1st place, gold medalist(s)	Moesha Johnson	Open water swimming	Women's 10 km	16 July 2025
1st place, gold medalist(s)	Moesha Johnson	Open water swimming	Women's 5 km	18 July 2025
3rd place, bronze medalist(s)	Moesha Johnson	Open water swimming	Women's 3 km knockout sprints	19 July 2025
1st place, gold medalist(s)	Rhiannan Iffland	High diving	Women's event	26 July 2025
1st place, gold medalist(s)	Maddison Keeney	Diving	Women's 1 metre spingboard	26 July 2025
2nd place, silver medalist(s)	Samuel Short	Swimming	Men's 400 metre freestyle	27 July 2025
1st place, gold medalist(s)	Mollie O'Callaghan; Meg Harris; Milla Jansen; Olivia Wunsch; Hannah Casey(heat); Abbey Webb(heat)	Swimming	Women's 4 × 100 metre freestyle relay	27 July 2025
1st place, gold medalist(s)	Flynn Southam; Kai Taylor; Maximillian Giuliani; Kyle Chalmers	Swimming	Men's 4 × 100 metre freestyle relay	27 July 2025
3rd place, bronze medalist(s)	Alexandria Perkins	Swimming	Women's 100 metre butterfly	28 July 2025
3rd place, bronze medalist(s)	Lani Pallister	Swimming	Women's 1500 metre freestyle	29 July 2025
1st place, gold medalist(s)	Kaylee McKeown	Swimming	Women's 100 metre backstroke	29 July 2025
2nd place, silver medalist(s)	Cassiel Rousseau; Maddison Keeney	Diving	3 m synchronized springboard	30 July 2025
1st place, gold medalist(s)	Mollie O'Callaghan	Swimming	Women's 200 m freestyle	30 July 2025
3rd place, bronze medalist(s)	Harrison Turner	Swimming	Men's 200 metre butterfly	30 July 2025
3rd place, bronze medalist(s)	Elizabeth Dekkers	Swimming	Women's 200 metre butterfly	31 July 2025
3rd place, bronze medalist(s)	Kyle Chalmers	Swimming	Men's 100 metre freestyle	31 July 2025
1st place, gold medalist(s)	Lani Pallister; Jamie Perkins; Brittany Castelluzzo; Mollie O'Callaghan; Abbey Webb(heat); Milla Jansen(heat); Hannah Casey(heat)	Swimming	Women's 4 × 200 metre freestyle relay	31 July 2025
2nd place, silver medalist(s)	Mollie O'Callaghan	Swimming	Women's 100 metre freestyle	01 August 2025
3rd place, bronze medalist(s)	Flynn Southam; Charlie Hawke; Kai Taylor; Maximillian Giuliani; Edward Sommerville(heat)	Swimming	Men's 4 × 200 metre freestyle relay	01 August 2025
2nd place, silver medalist(s)	Alexandria Perkins	Swimming	Women's 50 metre butterfly	02 August 2025
1st place, gold medalist(s)	Cameron McEvoy	Swimming	Men's 50 metre freestyle	02 August 2025
1st place, gold medalist(s)	Kaylee McKeown	Swimming	Women's 200 metre backstroke	02 August 2025
2nd place, silver medalist(s)	Lani Pallister	Swimming	Women's 800 metre freestyle	02 August 2025
1st place, gold medalist(s)	Cassiel Rousseau	Diving	Men's 10 metre platform	03 August 2025
1st place, gold medalist(s)	Meg Harris	Swimming	Women's 50 metre freestyle	03 August 2025
2nd place, silver medalist(s)	Jenna Forrester	Swimming	Women's 400 metre individual medley	03 August 2025
2nd place, silver medalist(s)	Kaylee McKeown; Ella Ramsay; Alexandria Perkins; Mollie O'Callaghan; Sienna Toohey(heat)	Swimming	Women's 4*100 metre medley relay	03 August 2025

== Athletes by discipline ==
The following is the number of competitors who will participate at the Championships per discipline.

Sport	Men	Women	Total
Artistic swimming	0	8	8
Diving	4	5	9
High diving	1	2	3
Open water swimming	3	3	6
Swimming	21	19	40
Water polo	15	15	30
Total	44	52	96

== Artistic swimming ==
Women

Athlete	Event	Preliminaries		Final	
Athlete	Event	Points	Rank	Points	Rank
Zoe Poulis	Solo technical routine	220.3541	19	Did not advance	
Georgia Courage-Gardiner; Margo Joseph-Kuo	Duet technical routine	241.6624	19	Did not advance	
Zoe Poulis	Solo free routine	185.1412	18	Did not advance	
Zoe Poulis; Amelie Carle; Bianca Chira; Georgia Courage-Gardiner; Margo Joseph-Kuo; Pam Kurosawa; Cliodhna Ni Cathain; Charlotte Smith	Team acrobatic routine	120.5608	24	Did not advance	

== Diving ==
20 athletes were named to the World Championships roster.

Men

Athlete	Event	Preliminaries		Semi-finals		Final	
Athlete	Event	Points	Rank	Points	Rank	Points	Rank
Hudson Skinner	1 m springboard	318.00	26	—		Did not advance	
Benjamin Wilson	1 m springboard	253.70	52	—		Did not advance	
Hudson Skinner	3 m springboard	329.10	43	Did not advance			
Hudson Skinner; Benjamin Wilson	3 m synchronized springboard	319.47	19	—		Did not advance	
Cassiel Rousseau	10 m platform	483.50	2 Q	478.20	4 Q	534.80	1st place, gold medalist(s)
Jonah Mercieca	10 m platform	371.65	19	Did not advance			
Jaxon Bowshire; Jonah Mercieca	10 m synchronized platform	333.09	14	—		Did not advance	

Women

Athlete	Event	Preliminaries		Semi-finals		Final	
Athlete	Event	Points	Rank	Points	Rank	Points	Rank
Georgia Sheehan	1 m springboard	236.90	14	—		Did not advance	
Maddison Keeney	1 m springboard	301.75	1 Q	—		308.00	1st place, gold medalist(s)
Georgia Sheehan	3 m springboard	228.25	35	Did not advance			
Maddison Keeney	3 m springboard	291.80	7 Q	317.30	3 Q	310.60	6
Maddison Keeney; Alysha Koloi	3 m synchronized springboard	269.28	3 Q	—		285.18	4
Ellie Cole	10 m platform	305.70	8 Q	312.00	6 Q	340.00	5
Maggie Grey	10 m platform	243.60	26	Did not advance			
Ellie Cole; Milly Puckeridge	10 m synchronized platform	284.04	5 Q	—		283.62	4

Mixed

Athlete	Event	Final	
Athlete	Event	Points	Rank
Cassiel Rousseau; Maddison Keeney	3 m synchronized springboard	307.26	2nd place, silver medalist(s)
Cassiel Rousseau; Milly Puckeridge	10 m synchronized platform	279.48	8
Cassiel Rousseau; Alysha Koloi; Ellie Cole	Team event	328.70	14

== High diving ==
Three athletes were named to the World Championships roster.

Men

Athlete	Event	Points	Rank
Zach Picton	Men's high diving	295.16	16

Women

Athlete	Event	Points	Rank
Rhiannan Iffland	Women's high diving	359.25	1st place, gold medalist(s)
Xantheia Pennisi	Women's high diving	269.50	10

== Open water swimming ==
Men

Athlete	Event	Heat		Semi-final		Final	
Athlete	Event	Time	Rank	Time	Rank	Time	Rank
Thomas Edwards Raymond	Men's 3 km knockout sprints	17:03.80	2 Q	11:28.10	3 Q	5:59.00	5
Nicholas Sloman	Men's 3 km knockout sprints	17:03.90	3 Q	11:32.60	=9 Q	6:10.30	10
Kyle Lee	Men's 5 km	—				57:39.60	7
Thomas Edwards Raymond	Men's 5 km	—				57:47.20	10
Nicholas Sloman	Men's 10 km	—				2:01:01.90	8
Kyle Lee	Men's 10 km	—				2:00:10.30	3rd place, bronze medalist(s)

Women

Athlete	Event	Heat		Semi-final		Final	
Athlete	Event	Time	Rank	Time	Rank	Time	Rank
Tayla Martin	Women's 3 km knockout sprints	18:13.60	6 Q	12:28.50	20	Did not advance	
Moesha Johnson	Women's 3 km knockout sprints	18:11.70	4 Q	12:09.60	1 Q	6:23.10	3rd place, bronze medalist(s)
Tayla Martin	Women's 5 km	—				1:04:37.40	20
Moesha Johnson	Women's 5 km	—				1:02:01.30	1st place, gold medalist(s)
Chelsea Gubecka	Women's 10 km	—				2:09:28.80	9
Moesha Johnson	Women's 10 km	—				2:07:51.30	1st place, gold medalist(s)

Mixed

Athlete	Event	Time	Rank
Chelsea Gubecka; Nicholas Sloman; Moesha Johnson; Kyle Lee	Team relay	1:09:59.30	5

== Swimming ==
Men

Athlete	Event	Heat		Semi-final		Final	
Athlete	Event	Time	Rank	Time	Rank	Time	Rank
Kyle Chalmers	50 m freestyle	22.05	20	Did not advance			
Cameron McEvoy	50 m freestyle	21.53	4 Q	21.30	1 Q	21.14	1st place, gold medalist(s)
Kyle Chalmers	100 m freestyle	47.48	2 Q	47.36	4 Q	47.17	3rd place, bronze medalist(s)
Flynn Southam	100 m freestyle	47.73	4 Q	47.90	12	Did not advance	
Edward Sommerville	200 m freestyle	1:46.72	17	Did not advance			
Flynn Southam	200 m freestyle	1:46.00	6 Q	1:45.80	10	Did not advance	
Samuel Short	400 m freestyle	3:42.07	1 Q	—		3:42.37	2nd place, silver medalist(s)
Elijah Winnington	400 m freestyle	3:46.67	10	—		Did not advance	
Ben Goedemans	800 m freestyle	7:48.66	9 q	—		7:50.72	7
Samuel Short	800 m freestyle	7:42.22	2 Q	—		DNS	
Samuel Short	1500 m freestyle	14:46.24	6 Q	—		14:43.08	4
Isaac Cooper	50 m backstroke	24.80	14 Q	24.53	8 Q	24.61	7
Joshua Edwards-Smith	100 m backstroke	54.52	29	Did not advance			
Joshua Edwards-Smith	200 m backstroke	1:56.77	10 Q	1:56.28	13	Did not advance	
Bradley Woodward	200 m backstroke	1:57.71	22	Did not advance			
Nash Wilkes	50 m breaststroke	DSQ		Did not advance			
Nash Wilkes	100 m breaststroke	1:00.42	20	Did not advance			
Jesse Coleman	50 m butterfly	23.40	23	Did not advance			
Jesse Coleman	100 m butterfly	51.20	7 Q	51.14	10	Did not advance	
Matthew Temple	100 m butterfly	50.97	4 Q	50.85	6 Q	50.57	5
Harrison Turner	200 m butterfly	1:54.74	8 Q	1:54.94	8 Q	1:54.17; NR	3rd place, bronze medalist(s)
William Petric	200 m individual medley	1:58.63	13 Q	1:58.21	12	Did not advance	
David Schlicht	200 m individual medley	1:59.50	16 Q	1:59.81	15	Did not advance	
William Petric	400 m individual medley	4:16.91	16	—		Did not advance	
Brendon Smith	400 m individual medley	4:13.08	6 Q	—		4:13.28	8
Flynn Southam; Kai Taylor; Maximillian Giuliani; Kyle Chalmers	4 × 100 m freestyle relay	3:11.29	2 Q	—		3:08.97; CR,OC	1st place, gold medalist(s)
Flynn Southam; Charlie Hawke; Kai Taylor; Maximillian Giuliani; Edward Sommerville(heat)	4 × 200 m freestyle relay	7:04.32	2 Q	—		7:00.98	3rd place, bronze medalist(s)
Joshua Edwards-Smith; Nash Wilkes; Matthew Temple; Kyle Chalmers	4 × 100 m medley relay	3:32.87	11	—		Did not advance	

Women

Athlete	Event	Heat		Semi-final		Final	
Athlete	Event	Time	Rank	Time	Rank	Time	Rank
Meg Harris	50 m freestyle	24.32	1 Q	24.31	=3 Q	24.02	1st place, gold medalist(s)
Mollie O'Callaghan	100 m freestyle	53.40	1 Q	52.82	2 Q	52.67	2nd place, silver medalist(s)
Olivia Wunsch	100 m freestyle	53.74	7 Q	DNS		Did not advance	
Mollie O'Callaghan	200 m freestyle	1:57.04	3 Q	1:55.49	2 Q	1:53.48	1st place, gold medalist(s)
Jamie Perkins	200 m freestyle	1:57.08	4 Q	1:55.89	5 Q	1:56.55	7
Lani Pallister	400 m freestyle	4:02.36	2 Q	—		3:58.87	4
Jamie Perkins	400 m freestyle	4:04.39	6 Q	—		4:03.20	6
Moesha Johnson	800 m freestyle	8:30.85	12	—		Did not advance	
Lani Pallister	800 m freestyle	8:17.06	2 Q	—		8:05.98; OC	2nd place, silver medalist(s)
Moesha Johnson	1500 m freestyle	16:05.13	6 Q	—		16:02.45	6
Lani Pallister	1500 m freestyle	15:46.95	2 Q	—		15:41.18	3rd place, bronze medalist(s)
Hannah Fredericks	50 m backstroke	28.03	18	Did not advance			
Hannah Fredericks	100 m backstroke	59.80	10 Q	59.73	11	Did not advance	
Kaylee McKeown	100 m backstroke	58.57	3 Q	58.44	2 Q	57.16; CR,OC	1st place, gold medalist(s)
Hannah Fredericks	200 m backstroke	2:10.23	15 Q	2:10.83	15	Did not advance	
Kaylee McKeown	200 m backstroke	2:08.01	1 Q	2:08.36	4 Q	2:03.33; CR	1st place, gold medalist(s)
Sienna Toohey	50 m breaststroke	30.76	16 Q	30.58	13	Did not advance	
Ella Ramsay	100 m breaststroke	1:07.23	21	Did not advance			
Sienna Toohey	100 m breaststroke	1:07.24	22	Did not advance			
Tara Kinder	200 m breaststroke	2:29.32	25	Did not advance			
Ella Ramsay	200 m breaststroke	2:25.95	12 Q	2:24.24	9	Did not advance	
Alexandria Perkins	50 m butterfly	25.41	2 Q	25.52	4 Q	25.31 =OC	2nd place, silver medalist(s)
Lily Price	50 m butterfly	25.77	12 Q	25.61	7 Q	25.61	6
Alexandria Perkins	100 m butterfly	56.89	6 Q	56.19	3 Q	56.33	3rd place, bronze medalist(s)
Lily Price	100 m butterfly	57.61	11 Q	57.58	11	Did not advance	
Brittany Castelluzzo	200 m butterfly	2:07.84	2 Q	2:08.04	9	Did not advance	
Elizabeth Dekkers	200 m butterfly	2:08.45	4 Q	2:06.13	1 Q	2:06.12	3rd place, bronze medalist(s)
Tara Kinder	200 m individual medley	2:09.45	1 Q	2:11.24	12	Did not advance	
Ella Ramsay	200 m individual medley	2:10.53	6 Q	2:11.22	11	Did not advance	
Jenna Forrester	400 m individual medley	4:36.17	2 Q	—		4:33.26	2nd place, silver medalist(s)
Mollie O'Callaghan; Meg Harris; Milla Jansen; Olivia Wunsch; Hannah Casey (heat); Abbey Webb (heat)	4 × 100 m freestyle relay	3:34.64	2 Q	—		3:30.60	1st place, gold medalist(s)
Lani Pallister; Jamie Perkins; Brittany Castelluzzo; Mollie O'Callaghan; Abbey Webb(heat); Milla Jansen(heat); Hannah Casey(heat)	4 × 200 m freestyle relay	7:51.76	2 Q	—		7:39.35	1st place, gold medalist(s)
Kaylee McKeown; Ella Ramsay; Alexandria Perkins; Mollie O'Callaghan; Sienna Toohey(heat)	4 × 100 m medley relay	3:55.80	2 Q	—		3:52.67	2nd place, silver medalist(s)

Mixed

Athlete	Event	Heat		Final	
Athlete	Event	Time	Rank	Time	Rank
Kai Taylor; Maximillian Giuliani; Hannah Casey; Milla Jansen	4 × 100 m freestyle relay	3:25.15	11	Did not advance	
Kaylee McKeown; Nash Wilkes; Matthew Temple; Milla Jansen; Alexandria Perkins (heat); Kai Taylor (heat); Hannah Fredericks (heat)	4 × 100 m medley relay	3:43.11	4 Q	3:41.02	5

== Water polo ==
Summary

Team	Event	Group stage				Playoff	Quarterfinal	Semi-final	Final / BM	
Team	Event	Opposition Score	Opposition Score	Opposition Score	Rank	Opposition Score	Opposition Score	Opposition Score	Opposition Score	Rank
Australia	Men's tournament	Hungary; L 6–18	Spain; L 7–10	Japan; L 11–12	4	—	—	South Africa; W 27–4	China; W 16-9	13
Australia	Women's tournament	Singapore; W 34–2	Italy; W 19–15	New Zealand; W 15–6	1 Q	Bye	Greece; L 7-8	Japan; W 21-17	Netherlands; L 11-13	6

=== Men's tournament ===
Team roster

The following is the Australian roster.

Head coach: Timothy Hamill

- 1 Nick Porter GK
- 2 Angus Lambie FP
- 3 Miloš Maksimović FP
- 4 Charlie Negus FP
- 5 Nathan Power FP
- 6 Timothy Putt FP
- 7 Luka Krstic FP
- 8 Jacob Mercep FP
- 9 Matthew Byrnes FP
- 10 Marcus Berehulak FP
- 11 Sam Nangle FP
- 12 Tristan Glanznig FP
- 13 Laurence Barker GK
- 14 Andrej Grgurevic FP
- 15 Drew McJannett FP

Group play

Pos	Team	Pld	W	PSW	PSL	L	GF	GA	GD	Pts	Qualification
1	Spain	3	3	0	0	0	42	32	+10	9	Quarterfinals
2	Hungary	3	2	0	0	1	50	34	+16	6	Playoffs
3	Japan	3	1	0	0	2	46	56	−10	3	Playoffs
4	Australia	3	0	0	0	3	24	40	−16	0	13–16th place semifinals

Source: Omegatiming
Rules for classification: 1) points; 2) head-to-head points; 3) head-to-head goal difference; 4) head-to-head number of goals scored; 5) Goal difference.

12 July 2025; 17:35	Report	Hungary	18–6	Australia	OCBC Aquatic Centre, Singapore; Referees: Andrej Franulović (CRO), Boris Margeta (SLO)
12 July 2025; 17:35	Report	Score by quarters: 5–1, 4–0, 3–2, 6–3			OCBC Aquatic Centre, Singapore; Referees: Andrej Franulović (CRO), Boris Margeta (SLO)
12 July 2025; 17:35	Report	Vámos 3	Goals	Grgurevic 3	OCBC Aquatic Centre, Singapore; Referees: Andrej Franulović (CRO), Boris Margeta (SLO)

14 July 2025; 16:00	Report	Australia	7–10	Spain	OCBC Aquatic Centre, Singapore; Referees: Stanko Ivanovski (MNE), Frank Ohme (GER)
14 July 2025; 16:00	Report	Score by quarters: 0–4, 2–5, 2–0, 3–1			OCBC Aquatic Centre, Singapore; Referees: Stanko Ivanovski (MNE), Frank Ohme (GER)
14 July 2025; 16:00	Report	Pavillard 2	Goals	three players 2	OCBC Aquatic Centre, Singapore; Referees: Stanko Ivanovski (MNE), Frank Ohme (GER)

16 July 2025; 10:35	Report	Australia	11–12	Japan	OCBC Aquatic Centre, Singapore; Referees: Germán Moller (ARG), Michiel Zwart (NED)
16 July 2025; 10:35	Report	Score by quarters: 3–3, 2–3, 2–0, 4–6			OCBC Aquatic Centre, Singapore; Referees: Germán Moller (ARG), Michiel Zwart (NED)
16 July 2025; 10:35	Report	Power 5	Goals	four players 2	OCBC Aquatic Centre, Singapore; Referees: Germán Moller (ARG), Michiel Zwart (NED)

13–16th place semifinals

18 July 2025; 09:00	Report	South Africa	4–27	Australia	OCBC Aquatic Centre, Singapore; Referees: Yasser Mehalhel (EGY), Chisato Kurosaki (JPN)
18 July 2025; 09:00	Report	Score by quarters: 1–5, 1–10, 2–9, 0–3			OCBC Aquatic Centre, Singapore; Referees: Yasser Mehalhel (EGY), Chisato Kurosaki (JPN)
18 July 2025; 09:00	Report	four players 1	Goals	three players 4	OCBC Aquatic Centre, Singapore; Referees: Yasser Mehalhel (EGY), Chisato Kurosaki (JPN)

13th place game

20 July 2025; 10:35	Report	Australia	16–9	China	OCBC Aquatic Centre, Singapore; Referees: Dasch Barber (RSA), Alessia Ferrari (ITA)
20 July 2025; 10:35	Report	Score by quarters: 5–2, 3–1, 5–3, 3–3			OCBC Aquatic Centre, Singapore; Referees: Dasch Barber (RSA), Alessia Ferrari (ITA)
20 July 2025; 10:35	Report	Power 5	Goals	Chen Z. 3	OCBC Aquatic Centre, Singapore; Referees: Dasch Barber (RSA), Alessia Ferrari (ITA)

=== Women's tournament ===
Team roster

The following is the Australian roster.

Head coach: Rebecca Rippon

- 1 Gabriella Palm GK
- 2 Hayley Ballesty FP
- 3 Tenealle Fasala FP
- 4 Bronte Halligan FP
- 5 Sienna Green FP
- 6 Abby Andrews FP
- 7 Charlize Andrews FP
- 8 Sienna Hearn FP
- 9 Pippa Pedley FP
- 10 Alice Williams FP
- 11 Matilda Kearns FP
- 12 Danijela Jackvoch FP
- 13 Genevieve Longman GK
- 14 Alexie Lambert FP
- 15 Olivia Mitchell FP

Group play

Pos	Team	Pld	W	PSW	PSL	L	GF	GA	GD	Pts	Qualification
1	Australia	3	3	0	0	0	68	23	+45	9	Quarterfinals
2	Italy	3	2	0	0	1	61	33	+28	6	Playoffs
3	New Zealand	3	1	0	0	2	37	36	+1	3	Playoffs
4	Singapore (H)	3	0	0	0	3	14	88	−74	0	13–16th place semifinals

Source: Omegatiming
Rules for classification: 1) points; 2) head-to-head points; 3) head-to-head goal difference; 4) head-to-head number of goals scored; 5) Goal difference.
(H) Host

11 July 2025; 19:10	Report	Singapore	2–34	Australia	OCBC Aquatic Centre, Singapore; Referees: Marcella Braga (BRA), Boris Margeta (SLO)
11 July 2025; 19:10	Report	Score by quarters: 0–7, 1–8, 1–10, 0–9			OCBC Aquatic Centre, Singapore; Referees: Marcella Braga (BRA), Boris Margeta (SLO)
11 July 2025; 19:10	Report	Lee, Ong C. 1	Goals	Williams 5	OCBC Aquatic Centre, Singapore; Referees: Marcella Braga (BRA), Boris Margeta (SLO)

13 July 2025; 17:35	Report	Australia	19–15	Italy	OCBC Aquatic Centre, Singapore; Referees: David Gómez (ESP), Frank Ohme (GER)
13 July 2025; 17:35	Report	Score by quarters: 4–3, 4–2, 6–4, 5–6			OCBC Aquatic Centre, Singapore; Referees: David Gómez (ESP), Frank Ohme (GER)
13 July 2025; 17:35	Report	A. Andrews 5	Goals	Ranalli 6	OCBC Aquatic Centre, Singapore; Referees: David Gómez (ESP), Frank Ohme (GER)

15 July 2025; 17:35	Report	Australia	15–6	New Zealand	OCBC Aquatic Centre, Singapore; Referees: Tamás Kovács-Csatlós (HUN), Marta Cabanas (ESP)
15 July 2025; 17:35	Report	Score by quarters: 4–0, 3–2, 5–1, 3–3			OCBC Aquatic Centre, Singapore; Referees: Tamás Kovács-Csatlós (HUN), Marta Cabanas (ESP)
15 July 2025; 17:35	Report	three players 3	Goals	Houghton 3	OCBC Aquatic Centre, Singapore; Referees: Tamás Kovács-Csatlós (HUN), Marta Cabanas (ESP)

Quarterfinals

19 July 2025; 16:00	Report	Australia	7–8	Greece	OCBC Aquatic Centre, Singapore; Referees: Zhang Liang (CHN), Michiel Zwart (NED)
19 July 2025; 16:00	Report	Score by quarters: 1–1, 2–4, 2–1, 2–2			OCBC Aquatic Centre, Singapore; Referees: Zhang Liang (CHN), Michiel Zwart (NED)
19 July 2025; 16:00	Report	A. Andrews, C. Andrews 2	Goals	Plevritou, Santa 2	OCBC Aquatic Centre, Singapore; Referees: Zhang Liang (CHN), Michiel Zwart (NED)

5-8th place semifinals

21 July 2025; 16:00	Report	Australia	21–17	Japan	OCBC Aquatic Centre, Singapore; Referees: Jennifer McCall (USA), Germán Moller (ARG)
21 July 2025; 16:00	Report	Score by quarters: 7–6, 6–4, 2–3, 6–4			OCBC Aquatic Centre, Singapore; Referees: Jennifer McCall (USA), Germán Moller (ARG)
21 July 2025; 16:00	Report	Jackovich 5	Goals	Arima 5	OCBC Aquatic Centre, Singapore; Referees: Jennifer McCall (USA), Germán Moller (ARG)

Fifth place game

23 July 2025; 17:35	Report	Australia	11–13	Netherlands	OCBC Aquatic Centre, Singapore; Referees: Ivan Raković (SRB), Jennifer McCall (USA)
23 July 2025; 17:35	Report	Score by quarters: 2–2, 2–3, 4–4, 3–4			OCBC Aquatic Centre, Singapore; Referees: Ivan Raković (SRB), Jennifer McCall (USA)
23 July 2025; 17:35	Report	Williams 3	Goals	Bosveld 3	OCBC Aquatic Centre, Singapore; Referees: Ivan Raković (SRB), Jennifer McCall (USA)
