= Iona Anderson =

Australian swimmer (born 2005)

Personal information
- Nationality: Australian
- Born: 3 October 2005 (age 20) Duncraig, Western Australia

Sport
- Sport: Swimming
- Strokes: Backstroke, freestyle, medley
Medal record
Women's swimming
Representing Australia
Event	1st	2nd	3rd
Olympic Games	0	1	1
World Championships (LC)	1	2	0
Commonwealth Games	3	1	0
Pan Pacific Championships	0	2	1
World Junior Championships	2	2	0
Total	6	8	2
Olympic Games
Silver medal – second place	2024 Paris	4×100 m medley
Bronze medal – third place	2024 Paris	4×100 m mixed medley
World Championships (LC)
Gold medal – first place	2024 Doha	4×100 m medley
Silver medal – second place	2024 Doha	50 m backstroke
Silver medal – second place	2024 Doha	100 m backstroke
Commonwealth Games
Gold medal – first place	2026 Glasgow	100 m backstroke
Gold medal – first place	2026 Glasgow	4×100 m medley
Gold medal – first place	2026 Glasgow	4×100 m mixed medley
Silver medal – second place	2026 Glasgow	50 m backstroke
Pan Pacific Championships
Silver medal – second place	2026 Irvine	4×100 m mixed medley
Silver medal – second place	2026 Irvine	4×100 m medley
Bronze medal – third place	2026 Irvine	50 m backstroke
World Junior Championships
Gold medal – first place	2023 Netanya	50 m backstroke
Gold medal – first place	2023 Netanya	4×100 m medley
Silver medal – second place	2023 Netanya	100 m backstroke
Silver medal – second place	2023 Netanya	4×100 m mixed medley

Iona Anderson (born 3 October 2005) is an Australian swimmer. She won one gold medal and two silver medals at the 2024 World Aquatics Championships.

== Career ==
Anderson attended Carine Senior High School and trained at the Breakers Swim Club before moving to the Western Australian Institute of Sport in Perth.

Anderson won silver in the 100-meter backstroke and gold in the 50-meter backstroke at the 2023 Junior World Championships. She won another gold medal with the 4 x 100-meter medley relay. She received a silver medal for her participation in the 4 x 100-meter mixed medley relay. In both relays, she was only used in the preliminary rounds; Jaclyn Barclay swam in the finals.

At the 2024 World Championships in Doha, Claire Curzan won the 100-meter backstroke competition with a lead of 0.83 seconds. Anderson finished second, 0.06 seconds ahead of Canadian Ingrid Wilm. Barclay finished fourth, 0.10 seconds behind Wilm. In the 50-meter backstroke, Curzan won by 0.02 seconds ahead of Anderson, while Wilm was 0.16 seconds behind Anderson and also received bronze. The Australian 4 x 100-meter medley relay team, consisting of Barclay, Abbey Harkin, Alexandria Perkins and Brianna Throssell, qualified for the final with the third fastest preliminary time. In the final, Anderson, Harkin, Throssell and Shayna Jack were five seconds faster than the preliminary relay team and won ahead of the Swedes and the Canadians.

Anderson finished second in the 100-meter backstroke at the 2024 Australian Championships and won the title with the 4 x 100-meter freestyle relay.
