= Swimming at the 2024 World Aquatics Championships =

- Host city: Doha, Qatar
- Date: 11–18 February
- Venue: Aspire Dome
- Events: 42

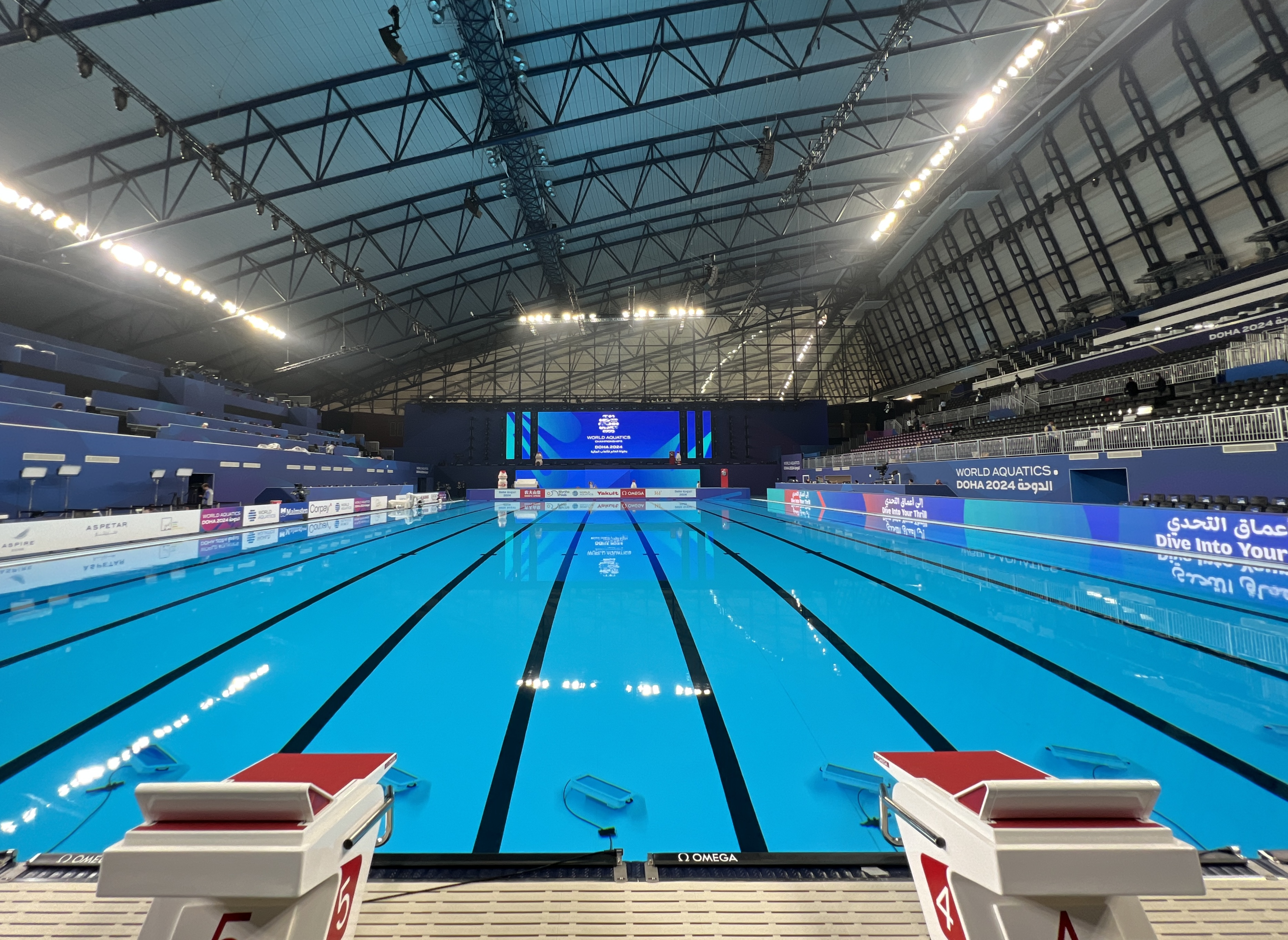
Aspire Dome, Main Competition Pool - Swimming, Doha

The swimming events at the 2024 World Aquatics Championships were held from 11 to 18 February 2024 at the Aspire Dome in Doha, Qatar. Daniel Wiffen of Ireland won the Male Swimmer of the Championships award and Claire Curzan of the United States won the Female Swimmer of Championships award. The United States won the Team of the Championships award.

== Qualification ==
=== Individual events ===
Each National Federation was permitted to enter a maximum of two qualified athletes in each individual event, but they could do so only if both of them had attained the "A" standard qualification time in the event at a World Aquatics certified competition between 1 October 2022 and 19 December 2023. (Note: The A standard time was derived from the faster of: the 2022 World Championships qualifying time, or the time required to finish sixteenth at the 2022 World Championships.) Federations could enter one athlete into the event if they met the "B" standard qualification time. (Note: The B standard time was derived from increasing the A standard time by 3.5%.) Athletes could also enter the event if they had met an A or B standard in a different event and their Federation had not entered anyone else.

Federations who had less than four swimmers who met standard qualification times could make up a quota of four by adding swimmers who had not met the standard qualification criteria, providing they maintained a balance in the gender of competing entrants. All these swimmers could enter up to two events each. For example, this meant Federations who had no swimmers who met any standard qualification times could enter at least two men and two women to the competition, all of whom could enter into up to two events.

Standard qualification times
	Men		Women	
Event	A standard time	B standard time	A standard time	B standard time
50 m freestyle	22.12	22.89	25.04	25.92
100 m freestyle	48.51	50.21	54.25	56.15
200 m freestyle	1:47.06	1:50.81	1:58.66	2:02.81
400 m freestyle	3:48.15	3:56.14	4:10.57	4:19.34
800 m freestyle	7:53.11	8:09.67	8:37.90	8:56.03
1500 m freestyle	15:04.64	15:36.30	16:29.57	17:04.20
50 m backstroke	25.16	26.04	28.22	29.21
100 m backstroke	54.03	55.92	1:00.59	1:02.71
200 m backstroke	1:58.07	2:02.20	2:11.08	2:15.67
50 m breaststroke	27.33	28.29	31.02	32.11
100 m breaststroke	59.75	1:01.84	1:07.35	1:09.71
200 m breaststroke	2:10.32	2:14.88	2:25.91	2:31.02
50 m butterfly	23.53	24.35	26.32	27.24
100 m butterfly	51.96	53.78	58.33	1:00.37
200 m butterfly	1:56.71	2:00.79	2:09.21	2:13.73
200 m individual medley	1:59.53	2:03.71	2:12.98	2:17.63
400 m individual medley	4:17.48	4:26.49	4:43.06	4:52.97

=== Relay events ===
Each National Federation could enter one team in each relay. The team had to be composed of swimmers who were also competing in the individual events, along with relay only swimmers who had to have met the B standard for the corresponding stroke and distance they would be swimming in the relay. Federations were only allowed to enter two relay-only swimmers for each relay they entered.

== Schedule ==
42 events were held.

All times are local (UTC+3).

H	Heats	½	Semi finals	F	Final

M = Morning session (starting at 09:30), E = Evening session (starting at 19:00)

Men
Date →	Sun 11		Mon 12		Tue 13		Wed 14		Thu 15		Fri 16		Sat 17		Sun 18	
Event ↓	M	E	M	E	M	E	M	E	M	E	M	E	M	E	M	E
50 m freestyle											H	½		F		
100 m freestyle							H	½		F						
200 m freestyle			H	½		F										
400 m freestyle	H	F														
800 m freestyle					H			F								
1500 m freestyle													H			F
50 m backstroke													H	½		F
100 m backstroke			H	½		F										
200 m backstroke									H	½		F				
50 m breaststroke					H	½		F								
100 m breaststroke	H	½		F												
200 m breaststroke									H	½		F				
50 m butterfly	H	½		F												
100 m butterfly											H	½		F		
200 m butterfly					H	½		F								
200 m individual medley							H	½		F						
400 m individual medley															H	F
4 × 100 metre freestyle relay	H	F														
4 × 200 metre freestyle relay											H	F				
4 × 100 metre medley relay															H	F

Women
Date →	Sun 11		Mon 12		Tue 13		Wed 14		Thu 15		Fri 16		Sat 17		Sun 18	
Event ↓	M	E	M	E	M	E	M	E	M	E	M	E	M	E	M	E
50 m freestyle													H	½		F
100 m freestyle									H	½		F				
200 m freestyle					H	½		F								
400 m freestyle	H	F														
800 m freestyle											H			F		
1500 m freestyle			H			F										
50 m backstroke							H	½		F						
100 m backstroke			H	½		F										
200 m backstroke											H	½		F		
50 m breaststroke													H	½		F
100 m breaststroke			H	½		F										
200 m breaststroke									H	½		F				
50 m butterfly											H	½		F		
100 m butterfly	H	½		F												
200 m butterfly							H	½		F						
200 m individual medley	H	½		F												
400 m individual medley															H	F
4 × 100 metre freestyle relay	H	F														
4 × 200 metre freestyle relay									H	F						
4 × 100 metre medley relay															H	F

Mixed
Date →	Sun 11		Mon 12		Tue 13		Wed 14		Thu 15		Fri 16		Sat 17		Sun 18	
Event ↓	M	E	M	E	M	E	M	E	M	E	M	E	M	E	M	E
4 × 100 m freestyle relay													H	F		
4 × 100 m medley relay							H	F								

== Medal summary ==
=== Medal table ===
* Host nation (Qatar)

Rank	Nation	Gold	Silver	Bronze	Total
1	United States	8	6	6	20
2	China	7	3	1	11
3	Australia	3	9	4	16
4	Netherlands	3	3	0	6
5	Italy	2	5	5	12
6	Great Britain	2	2	3	7
7	New Zealand	2	1	1	4
7	Sweden	2	1	1	4
9	South Korea	2	1	0	3
10	Ireland	2	0	0	2
10	Portugal	2	0	0	2
12	Germany	1	2	3	6
13	Canada	1	1	5	7
14	Hong Kong	1	1	1	3
15	Lithuania	1	1	0	2
15	Spain	1	1	0	2
17	Japan	1	0	1	2
18	Ukraine	1	0	0	1
19	Austria	0	1	1	2
19	France	0	1	1	2
21	Denmark	0	1	0	1
21	Israel	0	1	0	1
21	Switzerland	0	1	0	1
24	Poland	0	0	3	3
25	Bosnia and Herzegovina	0	0	1	1
25	Egypt	0	0	1	1
25	Greece	0	0	1	1
25	Hungary	0	0	1	1
25	Neutral Independent Athletes (Note: In accordance with sanctions imposed following by the 2022 Russian invasion of Ukraine, athletes from Belarus were not permitted to use the name, flag, or anthem of Belarus. They instead participated as "Neutral Independent Athletes (NIA)" and under the World Aquatics flag.)	0	0	1	1
25	South Africa	0	0	1	1
Totals (30 entries)		42	42	42	126

Source: Worldaquatics

=== Men ===
Event	Gold		Silver		Bronze	
50 metre freestyle	Vladyslav Bukhov; Ukraine	21.44	Cameron McEvoy; Australia	21.45	Ben Proud; Great Britain	21.53
100 metre freestyle	Pan Zhanle; China	47.53	Alessandro Miressi; Italy	47.72	Nándor Németh; Hungary	47.78
200 metre freestyle	Hwang Sun-woo; South Korea	1:44.75	Danas Rapšys; Lithuania	1:45.05	Luke Hobson; United States	1:45.26
400 metre freestyle	Kim Woo-min; South Korea	3:42.71	Elijah Winnington; Australia	3:42.86	Lukas Märtens; Germany	3:42.96
800 metre freestyle	Daniel Wiffen; Ireland	7:40.94	Elijah Winnington; Australia	7:42.95	Gregorio Paltrinieri; Italy	7:42.98
1500 metre freestyle	Daniel Wiffen; Ireland	14:34.07; NR	Florian Wellbrock; Germany	14:44.61	David Aubry; France	14:44.85
50 metre backstroke	Isaac Cooper; Australia	24.13	Hunter Armstrong; United States	24.33	Ksawery Masiuk; Poland	24.44
100 metre backstroke	Hunter Armstrong; United States	52.68	Hugo González; Spain	52.70	Apostolos Christou; Greece	53.36
200 metre backstroke	Hugo González; Spain	1:55.30	Roman Mityukov; Switzerland	1:55.40	Pieter Coetze; South Africa	1:55.99
50 metre breaststroke	Sam Williamson; Australia	26.32; OC	Nicolò Martinenghi; Italy	26.39	Nic Fink; United States	26.49
100 metre breaststroke	Nic Fink; United States	58.57	Nicolò Martinenghi; Italy	58.84	Adam Peaty; Great Britain	59.10
200 metre breaststroke	Dong Zhihao; China	2:07.94	Caspar Corbeau; Netherlands	2:08.24	Nic Fink; United States	2:08.85
50 metre butterfly	Diogo Ribeiro; Portugal	22.97	Michael Andrew; United States	23.07	Cameron McEvoy; Australia	23.08
100 metre butterfly	Diogo Ribeiro; Portugal	51.17	Simon Bucher; Austria	51.28	Jakub Majerski; Poland	51.32
200 metre butterfly	Tomoru Honda; Japan	1:53.88	Alberto Razzetti; Italy	1:54.65	Martin Espernberger; Austria	1:55.16
200 metre individual medley	Finlay Knox; Canada	1:56.64; NR	Carson Foster; United States	1:56.97	Alberto Razzetti; Italy	1:57.42
400 metre individual medley	Lewis Clareburt; New Zealand	4:09.72	Max Litchfield; Great Britain	4:10.40	Daiya Seto; Japan	4:12.51
4 × 100 metre freestyle relay	China; Pan Zhanle (46.80) WR; Ji Xinjie (48.18); Zhang Zhanshuo (48.63); Wang Haoyu (47.47)	3:11.08	Italy; Alessandro Miressi (47.90); Lorenzo Zazzeri (47.99); Paolo Conte Bonin (47.83); Manuel Frigo (48.36); Leonardo Deplano^{[b]}	3:12.08	United States; Matt King (48.02); Shaine Casas (48.47); Luke Hobson (47.68); Carson Foster (48.12); Hunter Armstrong^{[b]} Jack Aikins^{[b]}	3:12.29
4 × 200 metre freestyle relay	China; Ji Xinjie (1:46.45); Wang Haoyu (1:45.69); Pan Zhanle (1:43.90); Zhang Zhanshuo (1:45.80)	7:01.84; NR	South Korea; Yang Jae-hoon (1:47.78); Kim Woo-min (1:44.93); Lee Ho-joon (1:45.47); Hwang Sun-woo (1:43.76); Lee Yoo-yeon^{[b]}	7:01.94	United States; Luke Hobson (1:45.26); Carson Foster (1:43.94); Hunter Armstrong (1:45.73); David Johnston (1:47.15); Shaine Casas^{[b]}	7:02.08
4 × 100 metre medley relay	United States; Hunter Armstrong (53.15); Nic Fink (58.20); Zach Harting (51.13); Matt King (47.32); Jack Aikins^{[b]} Jake Foster^{[b]} Shaine Casas^{[b]} Luke Hobson^{[b]}	3:29.30	Netherlands; Kai van Westering (53.84); Arno Kamminga (58.23); Nyls Korstanje (51.12); Stan Pijnenburg (48.04); Caspar Corbeau^{[b]}	3:31.23; NR	Italy; Michele Lamberti (54.28); Nicolò Martinenghi (57.97); Gianmarco Sansone (52.14); Alessandro Miressi (47.20); Ludovico Viberti^{[b]} Federico Burdisso^{[b]}	3:31.59
AF African record | AM Americas record | AS Asian record | CR Championship record | ER European record | OC Oceania record | WR World record | NR National record

^{b} Swimmers who participated in the heats only and received medals.

=== Women ===
Event	Gold		Silver		Bronze	
50 metre freestyle	Sarah Sjöström; Sweden	23.69	Kate Douglass; United States	23.91; AM	Katarzyna Wasick; Poland	23.95; NR
100 metre freestyle	Marrit Steenbergen; Netherlands	52.26; NR	Siobhán Haughey; Hong Kong	52.56	Shayna Jack; Australia	52.83
200 metre freestyle	Siobhán Haughey; Hong Kong	1:54.89	Erika Fairweather; New Zealand	1:55.77	Brianna Throssell; Australia	1:56.00
400 metre freestyle	Erika Fairweather; New Zealand	3:59.44; NR	Li Bingjie; China	4:01.62	Isabel Marie Gose; Germany	4:02.39; NR
800 metre freestyle	Simona Quadarella; Italy	8:17.44	Isabel Marie Gose; Germany	8:17.53	Erika Fairweather; New Zealand	8:22.26
1500 metre freestyle	Simona Quadarella; Italy	15:46.99	Li Bingjie; China	15:56.62	Isabel Marie Gose; Germany	15:57.55
50 metre backstroke	Claire Curzan; United States	27.43	Iona Anderson; Australia	27.45	Ingrid Wilm; Canada	27.61
100 metre backstroke	Claire Curzan; United States	58.29	Iona Anderson; Australia	59.12	Ingrid Wilm; Canada	59.18
200 metre backstroke	Claire Curzan; United States	2:05.77	Jaclyn Barclay; Australia	2:07.03	Anastasiya Shkurdai; Neutral Independent Athletes	2:09.08
50 metre breaststroke	Rūta Meilutytė; Lithuania	29.40	Tang Qianting; China	29.51; AS	Benedetta Pilato; Italy	30.01
100 metre breaststroke	Tang Qianting; China	1:05.27; NR	Tes Schouten; Netherlands	1:05.82	Siobhán Haughey; Hong Kong	1:05.92; NR
200 metre breaststroke	Tes Schouten; Netherlands	2:19.81; NR	Kate Douglass; United States	2:20.91	Sydney Pickrem; Canada	2:22.94
50 metre butterfly	Sarah Sjöström; Sweden	24.63	Mélanie Henique; France	25.44	Farida Osman; Egypt	25.67
100 metre butterfly	Angelina Köhler; Germany	56.28	Claire Curzan; United States	56.61	Louise Hansson; Sweden	56.94
200 metre butterfly	Laura Stephens; Great Britain	2:07.35	Helena Rosendahl Bach; Denmark	2:07.44	Lana Pudar; Bosnia and Herzegovina	2:07.92
200 metre individual medley	Kate Douglass; United States	2:07.05	Sydney Pickrem; Canada	2:08.56	Yu Yiting; China	2:09.01
400 metre individual medley	Freya Colbert; Great Britain	4:37.14	Anastasia Gorbenko; Israel	4:37.36; NR	Sara Franceschi; Italy	4:37.86
4 × 100 metre freestyle relay	Netherlands; Kim Busch (55.21); Janna van Kooten (55.24); Kira Toussaint (53.81); Marrit Steenbergen (52.35); Milou van Wijk^{[b]}	3:36.61	Australia; Brianna Throssell (54.29); Alexandria Perkins (55.02); Abbey Harkin (54.98); Shayna Jack (52.64); Jaclyn Barclay^{[b]}	3:36.93	Canada; Rebecca Smith (54.93); Sarah Fournier (55.28); Katerine Savard (54.48); Taylor Ruck (53.26); Ella Jansen^{[b]}	3:37.95
4 × 200 metre freestyle relay	China; Ai Yanhan (1:57.65); Gong Zhenqi (1:58.84); Li Bingjie (1:54.59); Yang Peiqi (1:56.18); Ma Yonghui^{[b]}	7:47.26	Great Britain; Freya Colbert (1:57.14); Abbie Wood (1:56.65); Lucy Hope (1:58.71); Medi Harris (1:58.40)	7:50.90	Australia; Brianna Throssell (1:56.87); Shayna Jack (1:57.61); Abbey Harkin (1:58.92); Kiah Melverton (1:58.01); Jaclyn Barclay^{[b]}	7:51.41
4 × 100 metre medley relay	Australia; Iona Anderson (59.20); Abbey Harkin (1:07.21); Brianna Throssell (56.86); Shayna Jack (52.71); Jaclyn Barclay^{[b]} Alexandria Perkins^{[b]}	3:55.98	Sweden; Louise Hansson (59.93); Sophie Hansson (1:06.18); Sarah Sjöström (56.11); Michelle Coleman (54.13); Hanna Rosvall^{[b]}	3:56.35	Canada; Ingrid Wilm (58.95); Sophie Angus (1:06.24); Rebecca Smith (58.28); Taylor Ruck (52.96); Sydney Pickrem^{[b]} Katerine Savard^{[b]}	3:56.43
AF African record | AM Americas record | AS Asian record | CR Championship record | ER European record | OC Oceania record | WR World record | NR National record

^{b} Swimmers who participated in the heats only and received medals.

=== Mixed events ===
Event	Gold		Silver		Bronze	
4 × 100 metre freestyle relay	China; Pan Zhanle (47.29); Wang Haoyu (47.41); Li Bingjie (53.11); Yu Yiting (53.37); Ji Xinjie^{[b]} Ai Yanhan^{[b]}	3:21.18; AS	Australia; Kai Taylor (48.01); Jack Cartwright (47.90); Shayna Jack (52.38); Brianna Throssell (53.49); Alexandria Perkins^{[b]} Abbey Harkin^{[b]}	3:21.78	United States; Hunter Armstrong (47.83); Matt King (47.78); Claire Curzan (53.82); Kate Douglass (52.85); Luke Hobson^{[b]} Jack Aikins^{[b]} Addison Sauickie^{[b]} Kayla Han^{[b]}	3:22.28
4 × 100 metre medley relay	United States; Hunter Armstrong (53.07); Nic Fink (58.27); Claire Curzan (56.54); Kate Douglass (52.34); Jack Aikins^{[b]} Jake Foster^{[b]} Rachel Klinker^{[b]} Addison Sauickie^{[b]}	3:40.22	Australia; Bradley Woodward (53.92); Sam Williamson (59.54); Brianna Throssell (57.22); Shayna Jack (52.44); Alexandria Perkins^{[b]} Abbey Harkin^{[b]}	3:43.12	Great Britain; Medi Harris (1:00.28); Adam Peaty (59.42); Matthew Richards (52.87); Anna Hopkin (52.52); James Wilby^{[b]} Duncan Scott^{[b]}	3:45.09
AF African record | AM Americas record | AS Asian record | CR Championship record | ER European record | OC Oceania record | WR World record | NR National record

^{b} Swimmers who participated in the heats only and received medals.

== Records ==
The following world and championship records were set during the competition.

=== World records ===
Date	Event	Established for	Time	Name	Nation
February 11	Men's 4 × 100 metre freestyle relay final	Men's 100 metre freestyle	46.80	Pan Zhanle	China
