= Anna Moesch =

American swimmer, (born 2005)

Personal information
- Born: October 17, 2005 (age 20)

Sport
- Sport: Swimming
- Strokes: freestyle
- College team: University of Virginia
Medal record
Women's swimming
Representing the United States
World Championships (LC)
Silver medal – second place	2025 Singapore	4×100 m freestyle
Silver medal – second place	2025 Singapore	4×200 m freestyle
World Junior Championships
Silver medal – second place	2023 Netanya	4×100 m freestyle
Silver medal – second place	2023 Netanya	4×100 m mixed freestyle
Bronze medal – third place	2023 Netanya	100 m freestyle

Anna Moesch (born October 17, 2005) is an American swimmer. In 2026, she set the American record in the 100-meter freestyle.

== Career ==
From Green Brook Township, New Jersey, she attended Watchung Hills Regional High School. Moesch won an individual bronze medal in the 100 meters freestyle at the 2023 World Junior Championships. She also won silver medals in the 4 x 100 mixed free relay and the 4 x 100 women's free relay at the championships.

Moesch began competing for the University of Virginia in 2024. That year, she was involved in a swim-off for the final of the 100 meters freestyle at the US Olympic Trials, narrowly losing to veteran Erika Connolly.

The following year, she competed for the United States at the 2025 World Aquatics Championships in Singapore, winning two silver medals having swum in the preliminary legs of the women’s freestyle relays.

In March 2026, Moesch competed at the NCAA Division I championships, where she won the 200-yard freestyle, finishing 0.13 from the 11-year-old American and NCAA records held by Missy Franklin.

In May 2026, Moesch swam a new American record in the women's 100 meters freestyle (long-course), finishing in 51.94 seconds at the AP Race International in London, England. The time broke the previous American record of a 52.04 set by Simone Manuel in 2019. The time placed her second on the all-time list behind the World Record of a 51.71 set by Sarah Sjostrom in 2017. At the same meeting, she swam a time of 24.27 seconds to win the 50 meters freestyle and followed with a 52.30 anchor split in the American women's 400 medley relay. She later also won the 200 m freestyle with a time of 1:55.81.
