= Swimming at the 2025 World Aquatics Championships – Women's 4 × 100 metre freestyle relay =

Women's 4 × 100 metre freestyle relay at the 2025 World Aquatics Championships
- Venue: World Aquatics Championships Arena
- Location: Singapore Sports Hub, Kallang
- Dates: 27 July
- Competitors: 58 from 13 nations
- Teams: 13
- Winning time: 3:30.60

Medalists
gold medal	Mollie O'Callaghan; Meg Harris; Milla Jansen; Olivia Wunsch; Abbey Webb; Hannah Casey	Australia
silver medal	Simone Manuel; Kate Douglass; Erin Gemmell; Torri Huske; Anna Moesch	United States
bronze medal	Milou van Wijk; Tessa Giele; Sam van Nunen; Marrit Steenbergen; Femke Spiering	Netherlands

The women's 4 × 100 metre freestyle relay at the 2025 World Aquatics Championships was held on 27 July 2025 at the World Aquatics Championships Arena at the Singapore Sports Hub in Kallang, Singapore.

== Background ==
The event was expected to feature a close contest between Australia, the United States, and China. Australia, long dominant in the event, fielded a younger and less experienced team than in previous years, and Mollie O’Callaghan and Meg Harris were expected to lead the relay. Their cumulative individual 100-metre times from the 2025 Australian Trials were 3:33.61 which was their slowest since 2021, but with Harris absent from the trials final and O’Callaghan not at full effort, they were expected to be faster in Singapore. The United States, with Torri Huske, Gretchen Walsh, Kate Douglass, and Simone Manuel, appeared strong after a 3:31.20 cumulative trials time, their fastest since 2017. China, having lost Yang Junxuan, were relying on Wu Qingfeng and Cheng Yujie to pursue another podium finish.

== Qualification ==
Each National Federation could enter one team in the relay. The team had to be composed of swimmers who were also competing in the individual events, along with relay only swimmers who had to have met a specific qualifying time for the corresponding stroke and distance they would be swimming in the relay. Federations were only allowed to enter two relay-only swimmers for each relay they entered, though they could also enter relay-only swimmers from other relays which did not count toward this limitation.

== Records ==
Prior to the competition, the existing world and championship records were as follows.

World record	Australia	3:27.96	Fukuoka, Japan	23 July 2023
Competition record	Australia	3:27.96	Fukuoka, Japan	23 July 2023

== Heats ==
The heats took place on 27 July at 12:32.

Rank	Heat	Lane	Nation	Swimmers	Time	Notes
1	1	4	United States	Erin Gemmell (53.52); Kate Douglass (52.04); Anna Moesch (53.80); Simone Manuel (54.21)	3:33.57	Q
2	2	4	Australia	Olivia Wunsch (53.70); Abbey Webb (53.98); Hannah Casey (53.86); Milla Jansen (53.10)	3:34.64	Q
3	1	6	Netherlands	Milou van Wijk (54.09); Femke Spiering (54.65); Sam van Nunen (54.36); Marrit Steenbergen (52.37)	3:35.47	Q
4	2	5	China	Cheng Yujie (53.60); Liu Yaxin (53.92); Yang Wenwen (54.20); Wu Qingfeng (53.91)	3:35.63	Q
5	2	3	France	Béryl Gastaldello (54.10); Marina Jehl (54.27); Albane Cachot (53.91); Marie Wattel (53.48)	3:35.76	Q
6	1	1	Neutral Athlete B	Daria Trofimova (53.73); Aleksandra Kuznetsova (54.01); Daria Surushkina (54.43); Daria Klepikova (53.78)	3:35.95	Q, NR
7	1	3	Italy	Sara Curtis (53.59); Chiara Tarantino (54.59); Sofia Morini (54.36); Emma Virginia Menicucci (54.13)	3:36.67	Q
8	2	6	Hungary	Nikolett Pádár (55.12); Panna Ugrai (54.86); Petra Senánszky (53.60); Lilla Minna Ábrahám (53.46)	3:37.04	Q
9	1	5	Canada	Brooklyn Douthwright (54.36); Taylor Ruck (53.37); Sienna Angove (54.79); Ingrid Wilm (54.98)	3:37.50	
10	1	2	Germany	Nina Holt (54.36); Nina Jazy (54.54); Julianna Bocska (54.64); Lise Seidel (54.76)	3:38.30	
11	2	2	Denmark	Julie Kepp Jensen (54.82); Elisabeth Ebbesen (54.39); Schastine Tabor (55.73); Helena Rosendahl Bach (55.72)	3:40.66	
12	2	7	South Africa	Olivia Nel (54.91); Caitlin de Lange (56.00); Georgia Nel (56.38); Hannah Robertson (58.04)	3:45.33	
13	2	1	South Korea	Jo Hyun-ju (54.97); Hur Yeonk-yung (54.72); Lee Lee-na (57.77); Kim Do-yeon (58.18)	3:45.64	
—	1	7	Kenya	Did not start		

== Final ==
The final took place at 20:18.

Rank	Lane	Nation	Swimmers	Time	Notes
1st place, gold medalist(s)	5	Australia	Mollie O'Callaghan (52.79); Meg Harris (51.87); Milla Jansen (52.89); Olivia Wunsch (53.05)	3:30.60	
2nd place, silver medalist(s)	4	United States	Simone Manuel (53.09); Kate Douglass (51.90); Erin Gemmell (53.17); Torri Huske (52.88)	3:31.04	
3rd place, bronze medalist(s)	3	Netherlands	Milou van Wijk (53.27); Tessa Giele (54.13); Sam van Nunen (54.85); Marrit Steenbergen (51.64)	3:33.89	
4	6	China	Cheng Yujie (53.42); Liu Yaxin (53.93); Yu Yiting (53.88); Wu Qingfeng (52.94)	3:34.17	
5	2	France	Béryl Gastaldello (53.58); Marina Jehl (54.12); Albane Cachot (53.95); Marie Wattel (52.97)	3:34.62	NR
6	7	Neutral Athlete B	Daria Trofimova (53.77); Aleksandra Kuznetsova (54.00); Alina Gaifutdinova (54.24); Daria Klepikova (52.68)	3:34.69	NR (Note: National record for Russia, through they were representing the Neutral Athletes B team.)
7	1	Italy	Sara Curtis (53.29); Emma Virginia Menicucci (53.87); Chiara Tarantino (53.75); Sofia Morini (54.27)	3:35.18	NR
8	8	Hungary	Minna Ábrahám (53.97); Petra Senánszky (53.85); Panna Ugrai (54.41); Nikolett Pádár (54.11)	3:36.34	NR
