= Addison Sauickie =

American swimmer (born 2006)

Personal information
- Nationality: American
- Born: January 6, 2006 (age 20)
- Home town: Sarasota, Florida

Sport
- Sport: Swimming
- Strokes: Freestyle
- Club: Sarasota Sharks
Medal record
Women's swimming
Representing the United States
World Championships (LC)
Gold medal – first place	2024 Doha	4×100 m mixed medley
Bronze medal – third place	2024 Doha	4×100 m mixed freestyle
World Junior Championships
Gold medal – first place	2023 Netanya	200 m freestyle
Gold medal – first place	2023 Netanya	4×200 m freestyle
Silver medal – second place	2023 Netanya	4×100 m freestyle
Bronze medal – third place	2023 Netanya	400 m freestyle

Addison Sauickie (born January 6, 2006) is an American swimmer who won two medals at the 2024 World Championships.

== Career ==
Sauickie was born in 2006. She swam for Riverview High School in Sarasota, Florida. Sauickie helped the team win state championships in 2021, 2022, and 2023, and she won three state titles in the 200 y freestyle during those years.

Sauickie competed at the 2023 World Junior Championships. She won the gold medal in the 200 m freestyle and the bronze medal in the 400 m freestyle. She swam in the final of the 4 × 100 m freestyle relay, winning a silver medal. She swam in the final of the 4 × 200 m freestyle relay, winning a gold medal.

Sauickie competed at the 2024 World Championships. In the 400 m freestyle, she finished 11th in the heats and did not advance to the final. In the 200 m freestyle, she finished 12th in the semi-finals and did not advance to the final. Sauickie then swam in the heats of the mixed 4 × 100 m medley relay, and the U.S. finished first in the final, earning her a gold medal. She swam in the heats of the 4 × 200 m freestyle relay, and the U.S. did not advance to the final. She swam in the heats of the mixed 4 × 100 m freestyle relay, and the U.S. finished third in the final, earning her a bronze medal.
