= Felix Viktor Iberle =

Indonesian swimmer (born 2005)

Personal information
- National team: Indonesia
- Born: 4 February 2005 (age 21) Bali, Indonesia

Sport
- Sport: Swimming
- Strokes: Breaststroke
Medal record
Women's swimming
Representing Indonesia
SEA Games
Gold medal – first place	2023 Cambodia	50 m breaststroke
Bronze medal – third place	2025 Thailand	50 m breaststroke
World Junior Championships
Gold medal – first place	2023 Netanya	50 m breaststroke

Felix Viktor Iberle (born 4 February 2005) is an Indonesian swimmer who specializes in breaststroke. In the 2023 SEA Games, he won a gold medal in 50 m breaststroke and broke the SEA Games record. Iberle won a gold medal at the 2023 World Junior Championships, becoming the first Indonesian swimmer to win a medal at a world championships, both at the junior and senior levels. Iberle competed in the men's 50 metre at the 2025 World Aquatics Championships.

== Personal life ==
Iberle was born to German father and Indonesian mother from Pontianak.
