= Alexanne Lepage =

Canadian swimmer (born 2005)

Personal information
- Born: October 7, 2005 (age 20)
- Home town: Vernon, British Columbia, Canada

Sport
- Sport: Swimming
- Strokes: Breaststroke
- College team: University of Calgary
Medal record
Women's swimming
Representing Canada
World Championships (SC)
Bronze medal – third place	2024 Budapest	4×100 m freestyle
Pan Pacific Championships
Gold medal – first place	2026 Irvine	200 m breaststroke
World Junior Championships
Gold medal – first place	2023 Netanya	100 m breaststroke
Gold medal – first place	2023 Netanya	200 m breaststroke
Silver medal – second place	2023 Netanya	4×100 m medley

Alexanne Lepage (born October 7, 2005) is a Canadian competitive swimmer.

== Early life and education ==
Lepage swims at the collegiate level for the University of Calgary. She was named the 2023 Canada West Women's Swimmer of the Year and Rookie of the Year. At the 2026 Canada West championships, she won gold in the 50, 100 and 200 metre breaststroke, as well as the 400 metre individual medley, while contributing to three silver medal relay finishes. She continued her success at the U SPORTS championships, where she established new Canadian records in the 50 and 100 metre breaststroke. She concluded nationals with four individual gold medals and three relay silver medals. She was subsequently named the 2026 University of Calgary Athlete of the Year.

== Career ==
In August 2026, she competed at the 2026 Pan Pacific Swimming Championships and won a gold medal in the 200 metre breaststroke with a time of 2:21.73.
