= Swimming at the 2026 European Aquatics Championships – Women's 100 metre freestyle =

Women's 100 metre freestyle at the 2026 European Aquatics Championships
- Venue: Paris Aquatic Centre
- Dates: 10 August (heats and semifinals); 11 August (final)
- Competitors: 54 from 29 nations
- Winning time: 51.90

Medalists
gold medal	Marrit Steenbergen	Netherlands
silver medal	Milou van Wijk	Netherlands
bronze medal	Sara Curtis	Italy

The Women's 100 metre freestyle competition of the 2026 European Aquatics Championships was held on 10 and 11 August 2026.

== Records ==
Prior to the competition, the existing world, European and championship records were as follows:

Record	Time	Swimmer	Location	Date
World record	51.68	Marrit Steenbergen (NED)	(Italy) Rome	27 June 2026
European record	51.68	Marrit Steenbergen (NED)	(Italy) Rome	27 June 2026
Championship record	52.67	Sarah Sjostrom (SWE)	(Germany) Berlin	20 August 2014
World Jr record	52.70	Penny Oleksiak (CAN)	(Brazil) Rio de Janeiro	11 August 2016
European Jr record	53.61	Freya Anderson (GBR)	(United Kingdom) Glasgow	8 August 2018

== Results ==
=== Heats ===
The heats were started on 10 August at 09:49.

Rank	Heat	Lane	Swimmer	Nation	Time	Notes
1	6	4	Marrit Steenbergen	Netherlands	52.62	Q, CR
2	4	4	Milou van Wijk	Netherlands	53.00	Q
3	6	5	Daria Klepikova	Neutral Athletes B	53.66	Q
4	5	4	Sara Curtis	Italy	53.76	Q
5	4	3	Barbora Seemanová	Czech Republic	53.77	Q
6	6	3	Barbora Janíčková	Czech Republic	53.83	Q
7	4	5	Marie Wattel	France	53.98	Q
8	4	7	Imani de Jong	Netherlands	54.02	
9	5	5	Béryl Gastaldello	France	54.03	Q
10	4	2	María Daza	Spain	54.11	Q
11	5	8	Yara van Kalmthout	Netherlands	54.25	
12	5	6	Alexandra Kuznetsova	Neutral Athletes B	54.31	Q
13	5	2	Evelyn Davis	Great Britain	54.38	Q
14	4	0	Sofia Åstedt	Sweden	54.43	Q
15	6	6	Emma Virginia Menicucci	Italy	54.45	Q
16	6	2	Nina Jane Holt	Germany	54.48	Q
17	5	3	Florine Gaspard	Belgium	54.54	Q
18	4	6	Roos Vanotterdijk	Belgium	54.63	QSO
18	6	1	Kalia Antoniou	Cyprus	54.63	QSO
20	6	8	Linda Roth	Germany	54.65	
21	5	7	Theodora Taylor	Great Britain	54.66	
22	5	0	Grace Davison	Ireland	54.72	
23	6	9	Nicole Maier	Germany	54.94	
24	4	8	Iris Julia Berger	Austria	54.98	
25	4	1	Alessandra Mao	Italy	55.05	
26	3	6	Zuzanna Famulok	Poland	55.09	
27	3	4	Ieva Jurkūnaitė	Lithuania	55.18	
28	6	0	Nikolett Pádár	Hungary	55.30	
29	4	9	Lillian Slušná	Slovakia	55.31	
30	5	1	Chiara Tarantino	Italy	55.33	
31	5	9	Julianna Dora Bocska	Germany	55.36	
32	3	1	Daria Golovaty	Israel	55.37	
33	3	5	Sylvia Statkevičius	Lithuania	55.44	
34	2	4	Rosalie Phelan	Ireland	55.69	
35	3	2	Snæfríður Sól Jórunnardóttir	Iceland	55.72	
36	3	3	Anna Avgousta Vlachou	Greece	55.74	
37	2	5	Victoria Catterson	Ireland	55.80	
38	3	9	Diana Petkova	Bulgaria	55.83	
39	3	0	Lea Polonsky	Israel	55.84	
40	3	7	Kornelia Fiedkiewicz	Poland	55.90	
41	2	6	Danielle Farrell	Ireland	55.96	
42	3	8	Hedda Øritsland	Norway	56.10	
43	2	1	Laura Lahtinen	Finland	56.23	
44	2	9	Maari Randvali	Estonia	56.58	
45	2	3	Barbora Mileišytė	Lithuania	56.66	
46	1	4	Jóhanna Elín Guðmundsdóttir	Iceland	56.79	
47	2	2	Vala Dís Cicero	Iceland	56.95	
48	2	7	Sandra Maria Balto	Norway	57.06	
49	2	8	Angelina Patt	Switzerland	57.28	
50	2	0	Ieva Visockaitė	Lithuania	57.34	
51	1	3	Uliana Crevenciuc	Moldova	59.62	
52	1	5	Jovana Kuljaca	Montenegro	59.66	
53	1	2	Milania Gunko	Armenia	1:01.04	
54	1	6	Riga Shala	Kosovo	1:02.33	
	6	7	Freya Anderson	Great Britain	Did not start	

=== Swim-off ===
The swim-off was held on 10 August at 12:19.

Rank	Lane	Swimmer	Nation	Time	Notes
1	4	Roos Vanotterdijk	Belgium	53.70	Q
2	5	Kalia Antoniou	Cyprus	54.31	

=== Semifinals ===
The semifinals were started on 10 August at 18:37.

Rank	Heat	Lane	Swimmer	Nation	Time	Notes
1	2	4	Marrit Steenbergen	Netherlands	52.44	Q, CR
2	1	5	Sara Curtis	Italy	52.93	Q
3	2	5	Daria Klepikova	Neutral Athletes B	53.19	Q
4	1	4	Milou van Wijk	Netherlands	53.22	Q
5	2	3	Barbora Seemanová	Czech Republic	53.52	Q
6	2	6	Marie Wattel	France	53.53	Q
7	1	6	Béryl Gastaldello	France	53.58	Q
8	1	3	Barbora Janíčková	Czech Republic	53.62	Q
9	1	2	Alexandra Kuznetsova	Neutral Athletes B	53.70	
9	1	8	Roos Vanotterdijk	Belgium	53.70	
11	1	1	Nina Jane Holt	Germany	53.81	
12	1	7	Sofia Åstedt	Sweden	53.87	
13	2	2	María Daza	Spain	53.97	NR
13	2	7	Evelyn Davis	Great Britain	53.97	
15	2	1	Emma Virginia Menicucci	Italy	54.10	
16	2	8	Florine Gaspard	Belgium	54.73	

=== Final ===
The final was held on 11 August at 18:42.

Rank	Lane	Swimmer	Nation	Time	Notes
1st place, gold medalist(s)	4	Marrit Steenbergen	Netherlands	51.90	CR
2nd place, silver medalist(s)	6	Milou van Wijk	Netherlands	52.71	
3rd place, bronze medalist(s)	5	Sara Curtis	Italy	52.72	
4	3	Daria Klepikova	Neutral Athletes B	53.11	
5	8	Barbora Janíčková	Czech Republic	53.36	NR
6	7	Marie Wattel	France	53.52	
7	2	Barbora Seemanová	Czech Republic	53.63	
8	1	Béryl Gastaldello	France	53.91	
