= Jaclyn Barclay =

Australian swimmer (born 2006)

Personal information
- Nationality: Australian
- Born: 27 December 2006 (age 19) Everton Park, Queensland

Sport
- Sport: Swimming
- Strokes: Backstroke, freestyle, medley
Medal record
Representing Australia
World Championships (LC)
Gold medal – first place	2024 Doha	4×100 m medley
Silver medal – second place	2024 Doha	200 m backstroke
Silver medal – second place	2024 Doha	4×100 m freestyle
Bronze medal – third place	2024 Doha	4×200 m freestyle
World Junior Championships
Gold medal – first place	2023 Netanya	100 m backstroke
Gold medal – first place	2023 Netanya	4×100 m medley relay
Silver medal – second place	2023 Netanya	4×100 m mixed medley relay
Bronze medal – third place	2023 Netanya	50 m backstroke

Jaclyn Barclay (born 27 December 2006) is an Australian swimmer. She won one gold medal, two silver medals and one bronze medal at the 2024 World Aquatics Championships. Barclay swims for the St. Peters Western Swim Club in Brisbane.

== Career ==
Barclay swam the 200-meter backstroke title at the 2023 Australian Championships and came third in both of the shorter backstroke distances. She won gold in the 100-meter backstroke and bronze in the 50-meter backstroke at the 2023 Junior World Championships. She won another gold medal with the 4 x 100-meter medley relay. She won a silver medal with the 4 x 100-meter mixed medley relay. In both relays she was only used in the final, with Iona Anderson swimming in the preliminary rounds.

At the 2024 World Championships in Doha, the 4 x 100 meter freestyle relay team consisting of Alexandria Perkins, Barclay, Abbey Harkin and Shayna Jack swam the fastest preliminary time. In the final, Throssell, Perkins, Harkin and Jack beat the preliminary time by 1.4 seconds and came second behind the Dutch team. Barclay also received a silver medal for her performance in the preliminary round. In the 100 meter backstroke, Claire Curzan from the United States won with a lead of 0.83 seconds over Iona Anderson, who in turn finished 0.06 seconds ahead of Canadian Ingrid Wilm. Barclay came fourth, 0.10 seconds behind Wilm. In the 50 meter backstroke, Barclay was eliminated in the semifinals. In the 4 x 200 meter freestyle relay, Kiah Melverton, Abbey Harkin, Jaclyn Barclay and Brianna Throssell were used in the preliminary round. In the final, Harkin, Jack, Throssel and Melverton came third. In the 200 meter backstroke, Curzan won with 1.26 seconds ahead of Barclay, who finished two seconds ahead of third-placed Belarusian Anastasiya Shkurdai. The Australian 4 x 100 meter medley relay team, consisting of Barclay, Harkin, Perkins and Throssell, qualified for the final with the third fastest preliminary time. In the final, Anderson, Harkin, Throssell and Jack were five seconds faster than the preliminary relay and won ahead of the Swedes and the Canadians. Barclay won a silver medal in an individual event and a medal in each color for her appearances in relay heats.

At 17 years old, Barclay is the youngest swimmer in the 2024 Australian Olympic team.
