= 2023 World Aquatics Junior Swimming Championships =

Swimming event in Netanya, Israel

World Aquatics Junior Swimming Championships 2023
- Host city: Netanya, Israel
- Date: 4–9 September
- Venue: Wingate Institute
- Nations: 93
- Athletes: 648

Wingate Institute Competition Pool, World Aquatics Junior Swimming Championships 2023

The 9th World Aquatics Junior Swimming Championships were held in Netanya, Israel, at the Wingate Institute from 4 to 9 September 2023. These championships were the first to be held under the new World Aquatics name and branding. The age groups for these championships were altered slightly from the previous championships in 2022, with the equalisation of age groups to 14-18 years for both genders (athletes age as of 31 December 2023). In total 648 athletes from 93 member federations competed at the championships. Due to the status of their member federation athletes from the Philippines were required to compete as 'Neutral Independent Athletes'. Three large member federations opted not to compete at these championships, being Great Britain, France, and Hungary.

The United States of America topped the medal tally and were awarded the World Aquatics Team of the Championships award. Ukraine's Oleksandr Zheltiakov was awarded the World Aquatics Male Swimmer of the Championships award and Bosnia and Herzegovina’s Lana Pudar was awarded the World Aquatics Female Swimmer of the Championships award.

== Medal summary ==
=== Medal table ===
* Host nation (Israel)

| Rank | Medal | Gold | Silver | Bronze | Total |
|---|---|---|---|---|---|
| 1 | United States | 15 | 11 | 7 | 33 |
| 2 | Australia | 9 | 7 | 8 | 24 |
| 3 | Canada | 2 | 3 | 8 | 13 |
| 4 | Bosnia and Herzegovina | 2 | 1 | 0 | 3 |
| 4 | Denmark | 2 | 1 | 0 | 3 |
| 4 | Ukraine | 2 | 1 | 0 | 3 |
| 7 | Turkey | 2 | 0 | 0 | 2 |
| 8 | China | 1 | 4 | 4 | 9 |
| 9 | Japan | 1 | 3 | 3 | 7 |
| 10 | Bulgaria | 1 | 2 | 0 | 3 |
| 11 | Estonia | 1 | 1 | 1 | 3 |
| 12 | Czech Republic | 1 | 1 | 0 | 2 |
| 13 | Hong Kong | 1 | 0 | 0 | 1 |
| 13 | Indonesia | 1 | 0 | 0 | 1 |
| 13 | Trinidad and Tobago | 1 | 0 | 0 | 1 |
| 16 | Italy | 0 | 4 | 8 | 12 |
| 17 | Austria | 0 | 1 | 1 | 2 |
| 18 | New Zealand | 0 | 1 | 0 | 1 |
| 18 | South Korea | 0 | 1 | 0 | 1 |
| 20 | Argentina | 0 | 0 | 2 | 2 |
| 21 | Spain | 0 | 0 | 1 | 1 |
| Totals (21 entries) | | 42 | 42 | 43 | 127 |

Source: Medal table

=== Men ===
| Event | Gold | | Silver | | Bronze | |
|---|---|---|---|---|---|---|
| 50 m freestyle | Nikoli Blackman; Trinidad and Tobago | 22.35 | Flynn Southam; Australia | 22.43 | Lorenzo Ballarati; Italy | 22.47 |
| 100 m freestyle | Maximus Williamson; United States | 48.45 | Lorenzo Ballarati; Italy | 49.05 | Edward Sommerville; Australia | 49.16 |
| 200 m freestyle | Flynn Southam; Australia | 1:46.57 | Alessandro Ragaini; Italy | 1:47.28 | Anders McAlpine; Australia | 1:47.94 |
| 400 m freestyle | Petar Mitsin; Bulgaria | 3:46.49 | Alessandro Ragaini; Italy | 3:46.66 | Filippo Bertoni; Italy | 3:48.73 |
| 800 m freestyle | Kuzey Tunçelli; Turkey | 7:48.75 | Petar Mitsin; Bulgaria | 7:49.36 | Zhang Zhanshuo; China | 7:50.03 |
| 1500 m freestyle | Kuzey Tunçelli; Turkey | 14:59.80 | Kim Jun-woo; South Korea | 15:01.94 | Zhang Zhanshuo; China | 15:11.94 |
| 50 m backstroke | Miroslav Knedla; Czech Republic | 24.80 | Oleksandr Zheltyakov; Ukraine | 24.91; NR | Ulises Saravia; Argentina | 25.02 |
| 100 m backstroke | Oleksandr Zheltyakov; Ukraine | 53.73; NR | Miroslav Knedla; Czech Republic | 54.01 | Christian Bacico; Italy | 54.08 |
| 200 m backstroke | Oleksandr Zheltyakov; Ukraine | 1:56.13 | Daniel Diehl; United States | 1:58.93 | Christian Bacico; Italy | 1:59.33 |
| 50 m breaststroke | Felix Viktor Iberle; Indonesia | 27.39 | Jonas Gaur; Denmark | 27.55 | Watson Nguyen; United States | 27.85 |
| 100 m breaststroke | Joshua Chen; United States | 1:00.70 | Yamato Okadome; Japan | 1:01.20 | Watson Nguyen; United States | 1:01.22 |
| 200 m breaststroke | Adam Mak Sai-ting; Hong Kong | 2:11.84 | Jordan Willis; United States | 2:12.07 | Riku Yamaguchi; Japan | 2:12.13 |
| 50 m butterfly | Casper Puggaard; Denmark | 23.50 | Lukas Edl; Austria | 23.89 | Thomas Pattison; Australia | 23.95 |
| 100 m butterfly | Casper Puggaard; Denmark | 52.30 | Wang Xizhe; China | 52.65 | Lukas Edl; Austria | 52.68 |
| 200 m butterfly | Wang Xizhe; China | 1:56.22 | Petar Mitsin; Bulgaria | 1:56.73 | Alessandro Ragaini; Italy | 1:57.79 |
| 200 m individual medley | Maximus Williamson; United States | 1:57.29; CR | Daniel Diehl; United States | 1:58.62 | Lorne Wigginton; Canada | 1:59.44 |
| 400 m individual medley | Tomoyuki Matsushita; Japan | 4:10.97; CR | Zhang Zhanshuo; China | 4:12.44 | Lorne Wigginton; Canada | 4:12.81 |
| 4×100 m freestyle relay | United States (USA); Daniel Diehl (49.93); Maximus Williamson (47.78); Hudson Williams (49.14); Jason Zhao (48.64); Jacob Wimberly^{[a]} Ethan Harrington^{[a]} | 3:15.49; WJ | Australia (AUS); Edward Sommerville (49.24); Marcus da Silva (49.53); Anders McAlpine (49.45); Flynn Southam (48.47); Tane Bidois^{[a]} Thomas Pattison^{[a]} | 3:16.69 | Canada (CAN); Filip Senc-Samardzic (49.80); Paul Dardis (49.15); Antoine Sauve (48.73); Aiden Norman (49.66) | 3:17.34 |
| 4×200 m freestyle relay | United States (USA); Maximus Williamson (1:47.11); Cooper Lucas (1:47.75); Jason Zhao (1:47.56); Daniel Diehl (1:46.61); Norvin Clontz^{[a]} Ryan Erisman^{[a]} Nathan Szobota^{[a]} Jacob Wimberly^{[a]} | 7:09.03 | China (CHN); Wang Xizhe (1:48.05); Ji Yicun (1:48.76); Liu Wudi (1:48.50); Zhang Zhanshuo (1:47.06) | 7:13.37 | Australia (AUS); Anders McAlpine (1:49.17); Edward Sommerville (1:47.91); Marcus da Silva (1:49.68); Flynn Southam (1:49.26); Karl Albertyn^{[a]} Ike Martinez^{[a]} | 7:16.02 |
| 4×100 m medley relay | United States (USA); Daniel Diehl (54.37); Joshua Chen (1:00.25); Jacob Wimberly (53.79); Maximus Williamson (47.57); Caleb Maldari^{[a]} Watson Nguyen^{[a]} Jason Zhao^{[a]} Hudson Williams^{[a]} | 3:35.98 | Italy (ITA); Christian Bacico (54.29); Christian Mantegazza (1:01.87); Daniele Momoni (53.27); Davide Passafaro (48.57); Daniele Del Signore^{[a]} Carlos D'Ambrosio^{[a]} Mirko Chiaversoli^{[a]} | 3:38.00 | China (CHN); Jiang Chenglin (54.82); Zhang Zhanshuo (1:03.61); Wang Xizhe (52.05); Ji Yicun (49.33); Liu Wudi^{[a]} | 3:39.81 |

^{a} Swimmers who participated in the heats only and received medals.

=== Women ===
| Event | Gold | | Silver | | Bronze | |
|---|---|---|---|---|---|---|
| 50 m freestyle | Olivia Wunsch; Australia | 24.59 =CR | Annam Olasewere; United States | 24.95 | Hannah Casey; Australia | 25.07 |
| 100 m freestyle | Olivia Wunsch; Australia | 53.71 | Milla Jansen; Australia | 54.08 | Anna Moesch; United States | 54.69 |
| 200 m freestyle | Addison Sauickie; United States | 1:58.09 | Julie Brousseau; Canada | 1:58.10 | Leah Hayes; United States | 1:58.19 |
| 400 m freestyle | Jamie Perkins; Australia | 4:05.72 | Madi Mintenko; United States | 4:08.06 | Addison Sauickie; United States | 4:08.94 |
| 800 m freestyle | Kayla Han; United States | 8:29.66 | Mao Yihan; China | 8:33.66 | Agostina Hein; Argentina | 8:33.90 |
| 1500 m freestyle | Kate Hurst; United States | 16:09.37 | Ruka Takezawa; Japan | 16:18.68 | Mao Yihan; China | 16:18.76 |
| 50 m backstroke | Iona Anderson; Australia | 28.01 | Erika Pelaez; United States | 28.07 | Jaclyn Barclay; Australia | 28.14 |
| 100 m backstroke | Jaclyn Barclay; Australia | 59.47 | Iona Anderson; Australia | 59.88 | Erika Pelaez; United States | 59.94 |
| 200 m backstroke | Teagan O'Dell; United States | 2:08.09 | Jojo Ramey; United States | 2:10.18 | Bella Grant; Australia | 2:11.24 |
| 50 m breaststroke | Eneli Jefimova; Estonia | 30.42 | Monique Wieruszowski; New Zealand | 30.68 | Piper Enge; United States | 30.74 |
| 100 m breaststroke | Alexanne Lepage; Canada | 1:06.58 | Eneli Jefimova; Estonia | 1:06.84 | Jimena Ruiz; Spain | 1:07.25 |
| 200 m breaststroke | Alexanne Lepage; Canada | 2:24.70 | Mina Nakazawa; Japan | 2:25.57 | Eneli Jefimova; Estonia | 2:26.29 |
| 50 m butterfly | Leah Shackley; United States | 26.20 | Lana Pudar; Bosnia and Herzegovina | 26.26 | Olivia Wunsch; Australia Mizuki Hirai; Japan | 26.53 |
| 100 m butterfly | Lana Pudar; Bosnia and Herzegovina | 57.77 | Leah Shackley; United States | 58.29 | Mizuki Hirai; Japan | 58.35 |
| 200 m butterfly | Lana Pudar; Bosnia and Herzegovina | 2:07.20; CR | Bella Grant; Australia | 2:08.97 | Paola Borrelli; Italy | 2:10.89 |
| 200 m individual medley | Leah Hayes; United States | 2:10.24; CR | Haley McDonald; United States | 2:13.18 | Julie Brousseau; Canada | 2:13.74 |
| 400 m individual medley | Leah Hayes; United States | 4:36.84; CR | Ella Jansen; Canada | 4:37.35 | Julie Brousseau; Canada | 4:38.45 |
| 4×100 m freestyle relay | Australia (AUS); Milla Jansen (54.18); Hannah Casey (54.89); Jaimie de Lutiis (54.84); Olivia Wunsch (52.61); Jamie Perkins^{[a]} Amelia Weber^{[a]} | 3:36.52 | United States (USA); Leah Hayes (54.96); Anna Moesch (54.24); Addison Sauickie (54.62); Erika Pelaez (53.89); Madi Mintenko^{[a]} Teagan O'Dell^{[a]} Bailey Hartman^{[a]} | 3:37.71 | Canada (CAN); Julie Brousseau (55.64); Ella Jansen (54.21); Mia West (55.75); Sienna Angove (54.80); Delia Lloyd^{[a]} Ella Cosgrove^{[a]} | 3:40.40 |
| 4×200 m freestyle relay | United States (USA); Addison Sauickie (1:58.17); Leah Hayes (1:57.86); Lynsey Bowen (1:59.00); Madi Mintenko (1:57.45); Anna Moesch^{[a]} Bailey Hartman^{[a]} | 7:52.48 | Australia (AUS); Jamie Perkins (1:57.85); Hannah Casey (1:58.93); Jaimie de Lutiis (1:58.27); Amelia Weber (1:57.63); Bella Grant^{[a]} | 7:52.68 | Canada (CAN); Julie Brousseau (1:59.07); Sienna Angove (1:58.42); Ella Cosgrove (1:58.66); Ella Jansen (1:56.94); Mia West^{[a]} Julia Strojnowska^{[a]} | 7:53.09 |
| 4×100 m medley relay | Australia (AUS); Jaclyn Barclay (1:00.17); Hayley Mackinder (1:08.63); Isabella Boyd (59.33); Olivia Wunsch (52.73); Iona Anderson^{[a]} Isabella Johnson^{[a]} Bella Grant^{[a]} Milla Jansen^{[a]} | 4:00.86 | Canada (CAN); Delia Lloyd (1:01.51); Alexanne Lepage (1:07.04); Ella Jansen (58.40); Sienna Angove (55.01); Jordan Greber^{[a]} Halle West^{[a]} Victoria Raymond^{[a]} Julie Brousseau^{[a]} | 4:01.96 | Italy (ITA); Giada Gorlier (1:01.59); Francesca Zucca (1:07.35); Paola Borrelli (59.57); Sara Curtis (54.83); Irene Mati^{[a]} Marina Cacciapuoti^{[a]} | 4:03.34 |

^{a} Swimmers who participated in the heats only and received medals.

=== Mixed ===
| Event | Gold | | Silver | | Bronze | |
|---|---|---|---|---|---|---|
| 4×100 m freestyle relay | Australia (AUS); Flynn Southam (48.58); Edward Sommerville (48.54); Olivia Wunsch (53.62); Milla Jansen (53.55); Marcus da Silva^{[a]} Anders McAlpine^{[a]} Jaimie de Lutiis^{[a]} Hannah Casey^{[a]} | 3:24.29; WJ | United States (USA); Maximus Williamson (48.38); Jason Zhao (49.05); Erika Pelaez (53.76); Anna Moesch (54.40); Jacob Wimberly^{[a]} Hudson Williams^{[a]} Caroline Larsen^{[a]} Madi Mintenko^{[a]} | 3:25.59 | Canada (CAN); Paul Dardis (50.20); Antoine Sauve (49.15); Julie Brousseau (55.33); Ella Jansen (54.46); Aiden Norman^{[a]} Sienna Angove^{[a]} Mia West^{[a]} | 3:29.14 |
| 4×100 m medley relay | United States (USA); Teagan O'Dell (59.51); Watson Nguyen (1:00.66); Leah Shackley (57.71); Maximus Williamson (47.74); Caleb Maldari^{[a]} Joshua Chen^{[a]} Haley McDonald^{[a]} | 3:45.62 | Australia (AUS); Jaclyn Barclay (59.81); Gideon Burnes (1:01.44); Isabella Boyd (59.23); Edward Sommerville (48.70); Iona Anderson^{[a]} Joshua Kerr^{[a]} Enoch Robb^{[a]} Jaimie de Lutiis^{[a]} | 3:49.18 | Italy (ITA); Christian Bacico (53.90); Christian Mantegazza (1:01.60); Paola Borrelli (59.31); Matilde Biagiotti (55.28); Daniele del Signore^{[a]} Francesca Zucca^{[a]} Lorenzo Ballarati^{[a]} Cristiana Stevanato^{[a]} | 3:50.09 |

^{a} Swimmers who participated in the heats only and received medals.

== Records ==
The following world junior and championship records were set during the competition.

=== World junior records ===
| Date | Round | Event | Time | Name | Nation |
|---|---|---|---|---|---|
| September 4 | Final | Men's 4 × 100 metre freestyle relay | 3:15.49 | Daniel Diehl (49.93); Maximus Williamson (47.78); Hudson Williams (49.14); Jason Zhao (48.64) | United States |
| September 6 | Final | Mixed 4 × 100 metre freestyle relay | 3:24.29 | Flynn Southam (48.58); Edward Sommerville (48.64); Olivia Wunsch (53.62); Milla Jansen (53.55) | Australia |

=== Championship records ===
| Date | Round | Event | Time | Name | Nation |
|---|---|---|---|---|---|
| September 4 | Final | Women's 400 metre individual medley | 4:36.84 | Leah Hayes | United States |
| September 5 | Heat 4 | Men's 200 metre individual medley | 1:58.42 | Tomoyuki Matsushita | Japan |
| September 5 | Final | Women's 200 metre butterfly | 2:07.20 | Lana Pudar | Bosnia and Herzegovina |
| September 5 | Final | Men's 200 metre individual medley | 1:57.29 | Maximus Williamson | United States |
| September 6 | Semifinal 2 | Women's 100 metre breaststroke | 1:06.23 | Eneli Jefimova | Estonia |
| September 7 | Final | Women's 200 metre individual medley | 2:10.24 | Leah Hayes | United States |
| September 8 | Heat 7 | Men's 50 metre breaststroke | 26.98 | Felix Viktor Iberle | Indonesia |
| September 8 | Final | Men's 400 metre individual medley | 4:10.97 | Tomoyuki Matsushita | Japan |
| September 9 | Final | Women's 50 metre freestyle | =24.59 | Olivia Wunsch | Australia |

Note: The first version of the results erroneously recognized 3 performances as records. The Women's 50m Breaststroke results recorded championship record performances from Alexanne Lepage and Eneli Jefimova in the heats. Likewise, the performance from Kuzey Tuncelli in the final of the Men's 800m Freestyle was recognized as a championship record. Each performance was slower than the existing championship record. All results were later amended.
