= Swimming at the 2025 World Aquatics Championships – Women's 4 × 200 metre freestyle relay =

Women's 4 × 200 metre freestyle relay at the 2025 World Aquatics Championships
- Venue: World Aquatics Championships Arena
- Location: Singapore Sports Hub, Kallang
- Dates: 31 July
- Competitors: 50 from 10 nations
- Winning time: 7:39.35

Medalists
| gold medal | Lani Pallister; Jamie Perkins; Brittany Castelluzzo; Mollie O'Callaghan; Abbey Webb; Milla Jansen; Hannah Casey | Australia |
| silver medal | Claire Weinstein; Anna Peplowski; Erin Gemmell; Katie Ledecky; Simone Manuel; Anna Moesch; Bella Sims | United States |
| bronze medal | Liu Yaxin; Yang Peiqi; Yu Yiting; Li Bingjie; Yu Zidi; Wu Qingfeng | China |

The women's 4 × 200 metre freestyle relay at the 2025 World Aquatics Championships were held on 31 July 2025 at the World Aquatics Championships Arena at the Singapore Sports Hub in Kallang, Singapore.

== Background ==
Australia, the United States, and China were the top contenders in the event. Australia lead on paper with strong performances from Mollie O’Callaghan, Lani Pallister, Jamie Perkins, and either Abbey Webb or Hannah Casey. The USA came close behind with Claire Weinstein, Erin Gemmell, Katie Ledecky, and either Anna Peplowski or Torri Huske. China, with standout swims from Liu Yaxin and Li Bingjie, ranked third in predictions.SwimSwam predicted that Australia would win, the United States would take second, and China would come third.

== Qualification ==
Each National Federation could enter one team in the relay. The team had to be composed of swimmers who were also competing in the individual events, along with relay only swimmers who had to have met a specific qualifying time for the corresponding stroke and distance they would be swimming in the relay. Federations were only allowed to enter two relay-only swimmers for each relay they entered, though they could also enter relay-only swimmers from other relays which did not count toward this limitation.

== Records ==
Prior to the competition, the existing world and championship records were as follows.

| World record | Australia | 7:37.50 | Fukuoka, Japan | 27 July 2023 |
| Competition record | Australia | 7:37.50 | Fukuoka, Japan | 27 July 2023 |

== Heats ==
The heats took place 2025 at 11:35.

| Rank | Heat | Lane | Nation | Swimmers | Time | Notes |
|---|---|---|---|---|---|---|
| 1 | 1 | 5 | United States | Simone Manuel (1:58.06); Anna Peplowski (1:55.16); Anna Moesch (1:57.75); Bella Sims (1:58.46) | 7:49.43 | Q |
| 2 | 1 | 4 | Australia | Abbey Webb (1:58.66); Milla Jansen (1:59.51); Hannah Casey (1:57.66); Brittany Castelluzzo (1:55.93) | 7:51.76 | Q |
| 3 | 1 | 3 | China | Yu Zidi (1:59.28); Yu Yiting (1:58.36); Wu Qingfeng (1:59.10); Yang Peiqi (1:57.32) | 7:54.06 | Q |
| 4 | 1 | 7 | Hungary | Dóra Molnár (1:59.08); Panna Ugrai (1:58.82); Nikolett Pádár (1:58.61); Lilla Minna Ábrahám (1:58.18) | 7:54.69 | Q |
| 5 | 1 | 6 | Canada | Ella Jansen (1:58.78); Sienna Angove (1:58.62); Ella Cosgrove (1:59.41); Brooklyn Douthwright (1:58.09) | 7:54.90 | Q |
| 6 | 1 | 2 | Great Britain | Leah Schlosshan (1:59.50); Abbie Wood (1:58.86); Lucy Hope (2:00.40); Freya Anderson (1:57.65) | 7:56.41 | Q |
| 7 | 1 | 1 | Italy | Matilde Biagiotti (1:59.39); Anna Chiara Mascolo (1:58.75); Bianca Nannucci (1:58.44); Sofia Morini (2:00.44) | 7:57.02 | Q |
| 8 | 1 | 8 | Japan | Nagisa Ikemoto (1:58.90); Miyu Namba (1:59.32); Waka Kobori (1:59.41); Ichika Kajimoto (2:01.17) | 7:58.80 | Q |
| 9 | 1 | 9 | South Korea | Park Hee-kyung (1:59.94); Kim Bo-min (2:01.22); Park Su-jin (2:02.21); Jo Hyun-ju (1:57.74) | 8:01.11 | |
| 10 | 1 | 0 | South Africa | Aimee Canny (2:00.60); Georgia Nel (2:02.86); Hannah Robertson (2:04.76); Catherine van Rensburg (2:04.84) | 8:13.06 | |

== Final ==
The final took place at 20:44.

| Rank | Lane | Nation | Swimmers | Time | Notes |
|---|---|---|---|---|---|
| 1st place, gold medalist(s) | 5 | Australia | Lani Pallister (1:54.77); Jamie Perkins (1:55.13); Brittany Castelluzzo (1:56.01); Mollie O'Callaghan (1:53.44) | 7:39.35 | |
| 2nd place, silver medalist(s) | 4 | United States | Claire Weinstein (1:54.83); Anna Peplowski (1:54.75); Erin Gemmell (1:56.72); Katie Ledecky (1:53.71) | 7:40.01 | AM |
| 3rd place, bronze medalist(s) | 3 | China | Liu Yaxin (1:55.94); Yang Peiqi (1:55.84); Yu Yiting (1:56.37); Li Bingjie (1:54.84) | 7:42.99 | |
| 4 | 6 | Hungary | Nikolett Pádár (1:57.19); Panna Ugrai (1:57.18); Dóra Molnár (1:58.72); Lilla Minna Ábrahám (1:56.57) | 7:49.66 | |
| 5 | 7 | Great Britain | Freya Colbert (1:57.05); Freya Anderson (1:58.36); Abbie Wood (1:57.77); Leah Schlosshan (1:58.69) | 7:51.87 | |
| 6 | 2 | Canada | Brooklyn Douthwright (1:58.58); Sienna Angove (1:57.86); Ella Cosgrove (1:58.64); Ella Jansen (1:57.44) | 7:52.52 | |
| 7 | 1 | Italy | Anna Chiara Mascolo (1:58.22); Bianca Nannucci (1:58.31); Matilde Biagiotti (1:58.43); Emma Virginia Menicucci (1:59.20) | 7:54.16 | |
| 8 | 8 | Japan | Nagisa Ikemoto (1:59.65); Miyu Namba (1:59.82); Waka Kobori (1:58.45); Ichika Kajimoto (2:00.21) | 7:58.13 | |
