= Swimming at the 2025 World Aquatics Championships – Women's 1500 metre freestyle =

Women's 1500 metre freestyle at the 2025 World Aquatics Championships
- Venue: World Aquatics Championships Arena
- Location: Singapore Sports Hub, Kallang
- Dates: 28 July (heats); 29 July (final)
- Competitors: 27 from 21 nations
- Winning time: 15:26.44

Medalists
gold medal	Katie Ledecky	United States
silver medal	Simona Quadarella	Italy
bronze medal	Lani Pallister	Australia

The women's 1500 metre freestyle event at the 2025 World Aquatics Championships was held from 28 to 29 July 2025 at the World Aquatics Championships Arena at the Singapore Sports Hub in Kallang, Singapore.

== Background ==
Katie Ledecky of the United States remains the dominant force in the event, holding 24 of the top 25 times in history. Her 15:24.51 from May is the second-fastest swim ever and puts her nearly 15 seconds ahead of the next-fastest entrant in 2025.

Australia’s Lani Pallister is the top challenger, posting a national record of 15:39.14 to rank second this year. France’s Anastasia Kirpichnikova, Germany’s Isabel Gose, China’s Li Bingjie, and Italy’s Simona Quadarella—all returning Olympic finalists—are separated by just a few seconds and expected to contend for medals. Also in the mix are Australia’s Moesha Johnson, American Jillian Cox, and Hungary’s Vivien Jackl, each aiming for a spot in the final.

== Qualification ==
Each National Federation was permitted to enter a maximum of two qualified athletes in each individual event, but they could do so only if both of them had attained the "A" standard qualification time. For this event, the "A" standard qualification time was 16:24.56 minutes. Federations could enter one athlete into the event if they met the "B" standard qualification time. For this event, the "B" standard qualification time was 16:59.02 minutes. Athletes could also enter the event if they had met an "A" or "B" standard in a different event and their Federation had not entered anyone else. Additional considerations applied to Federations who had few swimmers enter through the standard qualification times. Federations in this category could at least enter two men and two women to the competition, all of whom could enter into up to two events.

Top 10 fastest qualification times
Swimmer	Country	Time	Competition
Katie Ledecky	United States	15:24.51	Fort Lauderdale stop of the 2025 TYR Pro Swim Series
Lani Pallister	Australia	15:39.14	2025 Australian Swimming Trials
Anastasiya Kirpichnikova	France	15:40.35	2024 Summer Olympics
Isabel Gose	Germany	15:41.16	2024 Summer Olympics
Li Bingjie	China	15:43.94	2025 Chinese Championships
Simona Quadarella	Italy	15:44.05	2024 Summer Olympics
Katie Grimes	United States	15:57.77	2024 United States Olympic Trials
Moesha Johnson	Australia	15:57.85	2024 Australian Olympic Trials
Claire Weinstein	United States	16:01.96	2025 United States Championships
Beatriz Dizotti	Brazil	16:02.86	2024 Summer Olympics

== Records ==
Prior to the competition, the existing world and championship records were as follows.

World record	Katie Ledecky (USA)	15:20.48	Indianapolis, United States	16 May 2018
Competition record	Katie Ledecky (USA)	15:25.48	Kazan, Russia	4 August 2015

== Heats ==
The heats took place on 28 July 11:29.

Rank	Heat	Lane	Swimmer	Nation	Time	Notes
1	3	4	Katie Ledecky	United States	15:36.68	Q
2	2	4	Lani Pallister	Australia	15:46.95	Q
3	2	3	Simona Quadarella	Italy	15:47.43	Q
4	2	7	Gan Ching Hwee	Singapore	16:01.29	Q, NR
5	3	3	Li Bingjie	China	16:02.31	Q
6	3	6	Moesha Johnson	Australia	16:05.13	Q
7	3	5	Anastasiya Kirpichnikova	France	16:06.97	Q
8	3	1	Yang Peiqi	China	16:08.19	Q
9	2	5	Isabel Marie Gose	Germany	16:08.41	
10	2	1	Ichika Kajimoto	Japan	16:09.65	
11	2	6	Jillian Cox	United States	16:09.74	
12	3	2	Ksenia Misharina	Neutral Athletes B	16:12.35	
13	2	8	Caitlin Deans	New Zealand	16:13.16	
14	2	9	Kristel Kobrich	Chile	16:22.66	
15	3	8	Viktória Mihályvári-Farkas	Hungary	16:28.04	
16	3	7	Eve Thomas	New Zealand	16:28.10	
17	2	2	Vivien Jackl	Hungary	16:29.60	
18	2	0	Gabrielle Roncatto	Brazil	16:31.26	
19	1	4	Artemis Vasilaki	Greece	16:36.57	
20	3	9	Leticia Fassina Romão	Brazil	16:37.65	
21	1	5	Kim Chae-yun	South Korea	16:47.88	
22	1	7	Delfina Dini	Argentina	16:48.03	
23	1	3	Thilda Häll	Sweden	16:52.74	
24	1	2	Anna Kalandadze	Georgia	16:55.47	
25	3	0	Diana Durães	Portugal	16:56.80	
26	1	6	Catherine van Rensburg	South Africa	16:59.73	
27	1	1	Kyra Rabess	Cayman Islands	17:15.71	

== Final ==
The final took place on 29 July at 19:12.

Rank	Lane	Name	Nationality	Time	Notes
1st place, gold medalist(s)	4	Katie Ledecky	United States	15:26.44	
2nd place, silver medalist(s)	3	Simona Quadarella	Italy	15:31.79	ER
3rd place, bronze medalist(s)	5	Lani Pallister	Australia	15:41.18	
4	2	Li Bingjie	China	15:49.54	
5	1	Anastasiya Kirpichnikova	France	15:57.40	
6	7	Moesha Johnson	Australia	16:02.45	
7	6	Gan Ching Hwee	Singapore	16:03.51	
8	8	Yang Peiqi	China	16:04.93	
