= Maggie Grey =

Australian diver (born 2010)

Personal information
- Born: 1 June 2010 (age 16) Australia

Sport
- Sport: Diving

Maggie Rose Grey (born 1 June 2010) is an Australian diver. She is a junior world diving champion.

== Sporting career ==
Grey started her athletic career as a gymnast at Splitz Gym at aged 7. Grey switched to diving at 9 and began training at Chandler Diving Club and coached by Olympian Jeffrey Arbon. Grey won a gold medal at the 2024 World Aquatics Junior Diving Championships. She competed at the 2025 World Aquatics Championships. She is the current Junior World Platform Champion and a 5 times Australian Champion. She has her sights set on competing at the 2028 Summer Olympics in Los Angeles. At age 14 Grey placed 2nd at the 2025 Australian Opens in the woman’s 10m platform. Grey won Gold in the woman’s 10m platform at the 2025 Canada Cup.

== Personal life ==
Grey is from Thornlands, Queensland. Grey started her athletic career at age 6 as a gymnast at the Splitz Gym in Sumner Park.
