= Milla Jansen =

Australian swimmer (born 2006)

Personal information
- Nationality: Australian
- Born: 29 November 2006 (age 19)

Sport
- Sport: Swimming
- Strokes: Freestyle
Medal record
Representing Australia
World Championships (LC)
Gold medal – first place	2025 Singapore	4×100 m freestyle
Gold medal – first place	2025 Singapore	4×200 m freestyle
World Championships (SC)
Silver medal – second place	2024 Budapest	4×100 m freestyle
Bronze medal – third place	2024 Budapest	4×200 m freestyle
Pan Pacific Championships
Gold medal – first place	2026 Irvine	4×200 m freestyle
Silver medal – second place	2026 Irvine	4×100 m freestyle
World Junior Championships
Gold medal – first place	2023 Netanya	4×100 m freestyle
Gold medal – first place	2023 Netanya	4×100 m medley
Gold medal – first place	2023 Netanya	4×100 m mixed freestyle
Silver medal – second place	2023 Netanya	100 m freestyle
Junior Pan Pacific Championships
Gold medal – first place	2022 Honolulu	50 m freestyle
Gold medal – first place	2024 Canberra	50 m freestyle
Silver medal – second place	2022 Honolulu	100 m freestyle
Silver medal – second place	2022 Honolulu	4×100 m freestyle
Silver medal – second place	2022 Honolulu	4×200 m freestyle
Silver medal – second place	2024 Canberra	100 m freestyle
Silver medal – second place	2024 Canberra	4×100 m freestyle
Silver medal – second place	2024 Canberra	4×100 m medley
Bronze medal – third place	2022 Honolulu	4×100 m medley
Bronze medal – third place	2024 Canberra	200 m freestyle
Bronze medal – third place	2024 Canberra	4×200 m freestyle

Milla Jansen (born 29 November 2006) is an Australian swimmer who competes in freestyle events.

== Career ==
Jansen grew up on the Gold Coast where she attended Somerset College and was a member of the Somerset Swim Club throughout her youth.

She won gold in 50 meter freestyle at the 2022 Junior Pan Pacific Swimming Championships.

On 25 October 2024, she beat the Australian record for her age range on 200 meter short course free style.

She was part of Australia's swimming team that took silver in the 4×100 meter freestyle and bronze in the 4x200 meter freestyle at the 2024 World Aquatics Swimming Championships in Budapest.

Jansen made her senior Long Course team debut at the 2025 World Aquatics Championships in Singapore. She won a gold medal swimming the final of the women's 4x100 meter freestyle relay, and was also awarded a gold medal for swimming the heats of the 4x200 meter freestyle relay.
