= Sam van Nunen =

Dutch swimmer

Personal information
- Born: March 15, 2001 (age 25) Netherlands
- Height: 1.75 m (5 ft 9 in)

Sport
- Sport: Swimming
Medal record
Women's swimming
Representing Netherlands
World Championships (LC)
Bronze medal – third place	2025 Singapore	4×100 m freestyle

Sam van Nunen (born 15 March 2001) is a Dutch swimmer. She competed in the women's 4 × 100-metre freestyle relay event at the 2024 Summer Olympics. She was part of the bronze medal-winning Dutch women's relay team at the 2025 World Aquatics Championships in the 4 × 100 m freestyle relay.
