= Edward Sommerville =

Australian swimmer

Personal information
- Born: 21 March 2005 (age 21) Auchenflower, Queensland, Australia

Sport
- Sport: Swimming
- Strokes: Butterfly, freestyle
- Club: Brisbane Grammar
Medal record
Men's swimming
Representing Australia
World Championships (LC)
Bronze medal – third place	2025 Singapore	4×200 m freestyle
World Championships (SC)
Silver medal – second place	2024 Budapest	4×200 m freestyle
Commonwealth Games
Gold medal – first place	2026 Glasgow	4×100 m freestyle
Gold medal – first place	2026 Glasgow	4×200 m freestyle
Pan Pacific Championships
Silver medal – second place	2026 Irvine	4×100 m freestyle
World Junior Championships
Gold medal – first place	2023 Netanya	4×100 m mixed freestyle
Silver medal – second place	2023 Netanya	4×100 m freestyle
Silver medal – second place	2023 Netanya	4×100 m mixed medley relay
Bronze medal – third place	2023 Netanya	100 m freestyle
Bronze medal – third place	2023 Netanya	4×200 m freestyle

Edward Sommerville (born 21 March 2005) is an Australian competitive swimmer. He won a bronze medal at the 4 × 200 m freestyle at the 2025 World Aquatics Championships. He also holds the Australian records in 4 × 100 m and 200 m freestyle relay races.
