= Olivia Wunsch =

Australian swimmer

Olivia Wunsch OAM
Personal information
- Born: 31 May 2006 (age 20) North Sydney, New South Wales, Australia

Sport
- Sport: Swimming
- Club: Carlile Swim Centre
Medal record
Women's swimming
Representing Australia
Olympic Games
Gold medal – first place	2024 Paris	4×100 m freestyle
World Championships (LC)
Gold medal – first place	2025 Singapore	4×100 m freestyle
Pan Pacific Championships
Silver medal – second place	2026 Irvine	4×100 m freestyle
Bronze medal – third place	2026 Irvine	100 m freestyle
World Junior Championships
Gold medal – first place	2023 Netanya	50 m freestyle
Gold medal – first place	2023 Netanya	100 m freestyle
Gold medal – first place	2023 Netanya	4×100 m freestyle
Gold medal – first place	2023 Netanya	4×100 m medley
Gold medal – first place	2023 Netanya	4×100 m mixed freestyle
Bronze medal – third place	2023 Netanya	50 m butterfly

Olivia Clare Wunsch (born 31 May 2006) is an Australian Olympic swimmer. She competed at the 2024 Summer Olympics and won a gold medal in the 4 × 100 m freestyle relay.

== Biography ==
Wunsch was born on 31 May 2006 in North Sydney, New South Wales. She started swimming at a young age for the Carlile Swim Centre in Ryde, where she still trains. She competed in her first state swimming tournament age eight and in 2017, she won several national championships at the Pacific School Games in the butterfly and freestyle sprint competitions. In 2018, Wunsch participated at the School Sport Australia National Championships and won seven medals; at the event in 2019, she helped her relay team win the gold medal while winning an individual medal herself in the 50m freestyle.

Wunsch won three silver medals at the 2021 Age Nationals and later that year qualified for the Australian junior national team. At the 2022 long course NSW State Age tournament, she won nine individual gold medals. She then won five medals (three silver, two bronze) at the Age Nationals and qualified for the junior national team again, earning her a spot at the Junior Pan Pacific Championships where she participated in five events, winning three medals. At the 2023 World Aquatics Junior Swimming Championships, Wunsch won six medals, including five gold, while she tied the championship record in the 50m freestyle and was part of the relay team setting the world junior record.

Wunsch set several personal bests at the Australian Olympic swimming trials in 2024, qualifying her for the 2024 Summer Olympics. At the Olympics, she was part of the team that won the gold medal in the 4 × 100 metre freestyle relay. As a gold medallist, she was awarded the Medal of the Order of Australia in the 2025 Australia Day Honours.
