= Milou van Wijk =

Dutch swimmer (born 2004)

Personal information
- Nationality: Dutch
- Born: 12 November 2004 (age 21) Zwijndrecht, Netherlands

Sport
- Sport: Swimming
- Strokes: Freestyle
Medal record
Women's swimming
Representing the Netherlands
Event	1st	2nd	3rd
World Championships (LC)	1	0	1
European Championships (LC)	1	2	0
European Championships (SC)	1	0	1
European U23 Championships	2	0	0
Total	5	2	2
World Championships (LC)
Gold medal – first place	2024 Doha	4×100 m freestyle
Bronze medal – third place	2025 Singapore	4×100 m freestyle
European Championships (LC)
Gold medal – first place	2026 Paris	4×100 m freestyle
Silver medal – second place	2026 Paris	100 m freestyle
Silver medal – second place	2026 Paris	4x100 m mixed freestyle
European Championships (SC)
Gold medal – first place	2025 Lublin	4×50 m freestyle
Bronze medal – third place	2025 Lublin	4×50 m mixed freestyle
European U23 Championships
Gold medal – first place	2025 Samorin	50 m freestyle
Gold medal – first place	2025 Samorin	100 m freestyle

Milou van Wijk (born 12 November 2004) is a Dutch swimmer.

== Career ==
van Wijk made her World Aquatics Championships debut in 2023. Her best finish was sixth place in the 4×100 metre freestyle relay. She again competed at the World Championships in 2024 and won a gold medal in the 4×100 metre freestyle relay with a time of 3:36.61. She was replaced by Marrit Steenbergen during the event final.

In June 2025, she competed at the 2025 European U-23 Swimming Championships and won gold medals in the 50 metre and 100 metre freestyle events. The next month she competed at the 2025 World Aquatics Championships and won a bronze medal in the 4×100 metre freestyle relay with a time of 3:33.89. She also advanced to the final of the 50 metre freestyle and finished in fifth place with a time of 24.47 seconds.

In August 2026, she competed at the 2026 European Aquatics Championships and won a gold medal in the 4×100 metre freestyle relay with a European Championships record time of 3:31.89. She also won a silver medal in the 100 metre freestyle with a time of 52.71 seconds.

== Personal life ==
van Wijk was diagnosed with Beckwith–Wiedemann syndrome, a rare growth syndrome as a baby. She was then diagnosed with cancer at two years old. She had a leg-length discrepancy of two and a half centimeters before she underwent surgery on her right knee. During the surgery they drilled into her growth plates so that only her left leg would continue to grow and eventually match the length of her right leg. She now only has a leg-length difference of six millimeters. Because she grew rapidly and asymmetrically, she also developed scoliosis.
