= Alexandra Kuznetsova =

Russian swimmer (born 2006)

Personal information
- Native name: Александра Викторовна Кузнецова
- Nationality: Russian
- Born: 20 April 2006 (age 20) Saint Petersburg, Russia

Sport
- Sport: Swimming
- Strokes: freestyle
- Coach: Elena Dendeberova
Medal record
Women's swimming
Representing Neutral Athletes B
World Championships (LC)
Gold medal – first place	2025 Singapore	4×100 m mixed medley
European Championships (LC)
Bronze medal – third place	2026 Paris	4x100 m freestyle
Bronze medal – third place	2026 Paris	4×100 m medley
Bronze medal – third place	2026 Paris	4×100 m mixed medley

Alexandra Viktorovna Kuznetsova (Russian: Алекса́ндра Ви́кторовна Кузнецо́ва) is a Russian swimmer, 2025 world champion, Russian champion, medalist of the Russian championships, winner of the Russian Cup, Master of Sports of Russia in swimming (2020).

== Biography ==
Alexandra Kuznetsova was born on April 20, 2006, in Saint Petersburg into a family of swimmers. Her father is Viktor Kuznetsov, and her mother is Elena Kuznetsova (Dendeberova). In 2022, she graduated from secondary school No. 514.

== Career ==
Kuznetsova trains at the "Ekran" Aquatics Sports School of Olympic Reserve under the guidance of her mother, Elena Dendeberova.

In 2020, she was awarded the title "Master of Sports of Russia" in swimming.

In 2023, she first became a winner of the Russian Championship as part of the mixed relay team of Saint Petersburg.

In 2024, she won four gold medals at the Russian Cup in relays and three gold medals at the Russian Short Course Swimming Championships.

In 2025, at the Russian Championship in Kazan, she became the winner in the 50-meter freestyle and in three relays.

At the World Championships in Singapore, she won a gold medal as part of the mixed medley relay team.

== Documents ==
- Order on awarding the title "Master of Sports of Russia"
