= Alexandria Perkins =

Australian swimmer (born 2000)

Personal information
- Nationality: Australian
- Born: 27 July 2000 (age 26) Southport, Queensland, Australia

Sport
- Sport: Swimming
- Strokes: Butterfly, freestyle
Medal record
Women's swimming
Representing Australia
Event	1st	2nd	3rd
Olympic Games	0	1	0
World Championships (LC)	1	5	1
World Championships (SC)	0	3	2
Commonwealth Games	6	1	0
Pan Pacific Championships	0	2	1
Total	7	12	4
Olympic Games
Silver medal – second place	2024 Paris	4×100 m medley
World Championships (LC)
Gold medal – first place	2024 Doha	4×100 m medley
Silver medal – second place	2024 Doha	4×100 m freestyle
Silver medal – second place	2024 Doha	4×100 m mixed freestyle
Silver medal – second place	2024 Doha	4×100 m mixed medley
Silver medal – second place	2025 Singapore	50 m butterfly
Silver medal – second place	2025 Singapore	4×100 m medley
Bronze medal – third place	2025 Singapore	100 m butterfly
World Championships (SC)
Silver medal – second place	2022 Melbourne	4×50 m freestyle
Silver medal – second place	2022 Melbourne	4×100 m medley
Silver medal – second place	2024 Budapest	4×100 m freestyle
Bronze medal – third place	2024 Budapest	50 m butterfly
Bronze medal – third place	2024 Budapest	100 m butterfly
Commonwealth Games
Gold medal – first place	2022 Birmingham	4×100 m mixed medley
Gold medal – first place	2026 Glasgow	50 m butterfly
Gold medal – first place	2026 Glasgow	100 m butterfly
Gold medal – first place	2026 Glasgow	4×100 m freestyle
Gold medal – first place	2026 Glasgow	4×100 m medley
Gold medal – first place	2026 Glasgow	4×100 m mixed freestyle
Silver medal – second place	2026 Glasgow	50 m freestyle
Pan Pacific Championships
Silver medal – second place	2026 Irvine	4×100 m freestyle
Silver medal – second place	2026 Irvine	4×100 m medley
Bronze medal – third place	2026 Irvine	100 m butterfly

Alexandria Perkins (born 27 July 2000) is an Australian swimmer who competes in the butterfly and freestyle events.

== Career ==
In February 2024, at the World Aquatics Championships in Doha, Perkins was part of Australia's swimming team that took silver in the 4×100 meter freestyle. She also won silver in the 4×100 mixed freestyle and 4×100 meter mixed medley after swimming the trial heats in both events where Australia subsequently took medals in the finals. In summer 2025, at the World Aquatics Championships in Singapore, Alexandria won a bronze medal in the 100m butterfly after having done a personal best time during the semifinal of 56.19 seconds. She also won an individual silver medal in the 50m butterfly just behind Gretchen Walsh equaling the Oceanic Record.

== Education ==
Perkins is a current Australian Catholic University (ACU) student, as of the 2024 Paris Olympics.
