= World Aquatics Junior Swimming Championships =

Swimming championship

The World Aquatics Junior Swimming Championships (commonly referred to as 'Junior World Championships' or 'Junior Worlds') is an international swimming championship event organized biennially by World Aquatics for swimmers aged 14–18 years as of 31 December of the year of the competition. It is usually held on odd years. Prior to 2023, the event was known as the FINA World Junior Swimming Championships and was open to female swimmers aged 14–17 and male swimmers aged 15–18 as of 31 December of the year of the competition.

== Editions ==
#	Year	Location	Dates	Swimmers	Countries	Events	Top nation
1	2006	Rio de Janeiro, Brazil	22–27 August	685	81	40	Italy
2	2008	Monterrey, Mexico	8–12 July	480	61	40	United States
3	2011	Lima, Peru	16–21 August	528	58	40	United States
4	2013	Dubai, United Arab Emirates	26–31 August	900	95	42	Australia
5	2015	Kallang, Singapore	25–30 August	700	87	42	Australia
6	2017	(United States) Indianapolis, USA	23–28 August	619	90	42	United States
7	2019	Budapest, Hungary	20–25 August	814	126	42	United States
8	2022	Lima, Peru	30 August – 4 September	509	87	42	Japan
9	2023	Netanya, Israel	4–9 September	648	93	42	United States
10	2025	Otopeni, Romania	19–24 August	+600	+100	42	United States

== Medal table ==
Last updated after the 2025 Championships

Rank	Nation	Gold	Silver	Bronze	Total
1	United States	95	75	65	235
2	Australia	41	30	26	97
3	Russia	35	40	42	117
4	Japan	33	42	38	113
5	Italy	27	37	49	113
6	Canada	18	26	33	77
7	Hungary	13	21	3	37
8	Great Britain	13	19	24	56
9	Turkey	13	2	3	18
10	Spain	12	7	12	31
11	Poland	12	6	13	31
12	China	11	14	12	37
13	Ukraine	11	4	5	20
14	New Zealand	10	2	1	13
15	Lithuania	7	4	4	15
16	Romania	6	5	4	15
17	Germany	5	12	5	22
18	France	5	6	10	21
19	Neutral Athletes B	5	5	5	15
20	Brazil	3	11	6	20
21	South Africa	3	6	9	18
22	Greece	3	3	6	12
23	Croatia	3	2	3	8
24	Argentina	3	2	2	7
25	Ireland	3	1	2	6
26	Portugal	3	0	0	3
27	Czech Republic	2	5	5	12
28	Serbia	2	5	3	10
29	Austria	2	3	4	9
30	Denmark	2	1	3	6
31	Belgium	2	1	0	3
31	Bosnia and Herzegovina	2	1	0	3
33	Hong Kong	2	0	2	4
34	Slovenia	2	0	0	2
35	Belarus	1	3	1	5
36	Bulgaria	1	2	2	5
36	South Korea	1	2	2	5
38	Estonia	1	1	1	3
39	Trinidad and Tobago	1	1	0	2
40	Egypt	1	0	1	2
41	Indonesia	1	0	0	1
42	Sweden	0	4	2	6
43	Malaysia	0	2	0	2
44	Cyprus	0	1	1	2
45	Nigeria	0	1	0	1
46	Venezuela	0	0	3	3
47	Ecuador	0	0	1	1
47	Panama	0	0	1	1
47	Slovakia	0	0	1	1
Totals (49 entries)		416	415	415	1,246

== Championships records ==
All records were set in finals unless noted otherwise. All times are swum in a long-course (50m) pool.

=== Men ===
Event	Time		Name	Nationality	Date	Meet	Location	Ref
50m freestyle	21.75	h, =	Michael Andrew	United States	25 August 2017	2017 Championships	Indianapolis, United States	
50m freestyle	21.75	=	Michael Andrew	United States	26 August 2017	2017 Championships	Indianapolis, United States	
50m freestyle	21.75	sf, =	Nikita Sheremet	Ukraine	21 August 2025	2025 Championships	Otopeni, Romania	
100m freestyle	47.07	r	David Popovici	Romania	30 August 2022	2022 Championships	Lima, Peru	
200m freestyle	1:45.15		Carlos D'Ambrosio	Italy	20 August 2025	2025 Championships	Otopeni, Romania	
400m freestyle	3:46.06		Gábor Zombori	Hungary	20 August 2019	2019 Championships	Budapest, Hungary	
800m freestyle	7:45.67		Mack Horton	Australia	28 August 2013	2013 Championships	Dubai, United Arab Emirates	
1500m freestyle	14:46.09		Franko Grgić	Croatia	25 August 2019	2019 Championships	Budapest, Hungary	
50m backstroke	24.44		Ksawery Masiuk	Poland	2 September 2022	2022 Championships	Lima, Peru	
100m backstroke	52.91		Ksawery Masiuk	Poland	31 August 2022	2022 Championships	Lima, Peru	
200m backstroke	1:56.05		Pieter Coetze	South Africa	4 September 2022	2022 Championships	Lima, Peru	
50m breaststroke	26.95	h	Jan Malte Grafe	Germany	23 August 2025	2025 Championships	Otopeni, Romania	
100m breaststroke	59.01	sf	Nicolò Martinenghi	Italy	23 August 2017	2017 Championships	Indianapolis, United States	
200m breaststroke	2:07.32		Filip Nowacki	Great Britain	22 August 2025	2025 Championships	Otopeni, Romania	
50m butterfly	22.96		Diogo Ribeiro	Portugal	3 September 2022	2022 Championships	Lima, Peru	
100m butterfly	51.08		Kristóf Milák	Hungary	25 August 2017	2017 Championships	Indianapolis, United States	
200m butterfly	1:53.87		Kristóf Milák	Hungary	28 August 2017	2017 Championships	Indianapolis, United States	
200m individual medley	1:57.25		Mikhail Shcherbakov	Neutral Athletes B	20 August 2025	2025 Championships	Otopeni, Romania	
400m individual medley	4:10.97		Tomoyuki Matsushita	Japan	8 September 2023	2023 Championships	Netanya, Israel	
4×100m freestyle relay	3:15.38		Mikhail Shcherbakov (49.13); Roman Zhidkov (48.37); Egor Proshin (48.98); Georgii Zlotnikov (48.90)	Neutral Athletes B	19 August 2025	2025 Championships	Otopeni, Romania	
4×200m freestyle relay	7:08.37		Jake Magahey (1:48.11); Luca Urlando (1:47.13); Jake Mitchell (1:47.03); Carson Foster (1:46.10)	United States	23 August 2019	2019 Championships	Budapest, Hungary	
4×100m medley relay	3:33.19		Nikolay Zuev (53.84); Vladislav Gerasimenko (59.53); Andrei Minakov (50.93); Aleksandr Shchegolev (48.89)	Russia	25 August 2019	2019 Championships	Budapest, Hungary	

Legend: # – Record awaiting ratification by FINA;
Records not set in finals: h – heat; sf – semifinal; r – relay 1st leg; rh – relay heat 1st leg; b – B final; † – en route to final mark; tt – time trial

=== Women ===
Event	Time		Name	Nationality	Date	Meet	Location	Ref
50m freestyle	24.59	=	Rikako Ikee	Japan	28 August 2017	2017 Championships	Indianapolis, United States	
50m freestyle	24.59	=	Olivia Wunsch	Australia	9 September 2023	2023 Championships	Netanya, Israel	
100m freestyle	52.79		Rylee Erisman	United States	20 August 2025	2025 Championships	Otopeni, Romania	
200m freestyle	1:56.25		Yang Peiqi	China	24 August 2025	2025 Championships	Otopeni, Romania	
400m freestyle	4:05.38		Yang Peiqi	China	22 August 2025	2025 Championships	Otopeni, Romania	
800m freestyle	8:22.49		Lani Pallister	Australia	21 August 2019	2019 Championships	Budapest, Hungary	
1500m freestyle	15:58.86		Lani Pallister	Australia	24 August 2019	2019 Championships	Budapest, Hungary	
50m backstroke	27.77	sf	Kim Seung-won	South Korea	22 August 2025	2025 Championships	Otopeni, Romania	
100m backstroke	59.11		Regan Smith	United States	24 August 2017	2017 Championships	Indianapolis, United States	
200m backstroke	2:06.99		Audrey Derivaux	United States	20 August 2025	2025 Championships	Otopeni, Romania	
50m breaststroke	29.86		Rūta Meilutytė	Lithuania	27 August 2013	2013 Championships	Dubai, United Arab Emirates	
100m breaststroke	1:06.23	sf	Eneli Jefimova	Estonia	6 September 2023	2023 Championships	Netanya, Israel	
200m breaststroke	2:19.64		Viktoriya Zeynep Gunes	Turkey	30 August 2015	2015 Championships	Singapore, Singapore	
50m butterfly	25.46		Rikako Ikee	Japan	26 August 2017	2017 Championships	Indianapolis, United States	
100m butterfly	56.87		Mizuki Hirai	Japan	24 August 2025	2025 Championships	Otopeni, Romania	
200m butterfly	2:07.20		Lana Pudar	Bosnia and Herzegovina	5 September 2023	2023 Championships	Netanya, Israel	
200m individual medley	2:10.24		Leah Hayes	United States	7 September 2023	2023 Championships	Netanya, Israel	
400m individual medley	4:34.34		Agostina Hein	Argentina	19 August 2025	2025 Championships	Otopeni, Romania	
4×100m freestyle relay	3:35.53		Rylee Erisman (53.41); Liberty Clark (53.85); Julie Mishler (54.65); Lily King (53.62)	United States	23 August 2025	2025 Championships	Otopeni, Romania	
4×200m freestyle relay	7:51.47		Kayla Sanchez (1:59.01); Penny Oleksiak (1:56.86); Rebecca Smith (1:58.66); Taylor Ruck (1:56.94)	Canada	23 August 2017	2017 Championships	Indianapolis, United States	
4×100m medley relay	3:58.38		Jade Hannah (1:00.68); Faith Knelson (1:07.86); Penny Oleksiak (56.91); Taylor Ruck (52.93)	Canada	28 August 2017	2017 Championships	Indianapolis, United States	

Legend: # – Record awaiting ratification by FINA;
Records not set in finals: h – heat; sf – semifinal; r – relay 1st leg; rh – relay heat 1st leg; b – B final; † – en route to final mark; tt – time trial

=== Mixed ===
Event	Time	Name	Nationality	Date	Meet	Location	Ref
4x100 m freestyle relay	3:24.29	Flynn Southam (48.58); Edward Sommerville (48.54); Olivia Wunsch (53.62); Milla Jensen (53.55)	Australia	6 September 2023	2023 Championships	Netanya, Israel	
4x100 m medley relay	3:44.84	Will Grant (53.89); Josh Matheny (59.31); Torri Huske (58.04); Gretchen Walsh (53.60)	United States	21 August 2019	2019 Championships	Budapest, Hungary	

Legend: # – Record awaiting ratification by FINA;
Records not set in finals: h – heat; sf – semifinal; r – relay 1st leg; rh – relay heat 1st leg; b – B final; † – en route to final mark; tt – time trial

== See also ==
- FINA World Junior Diving Championships
- Swimming at the Youth Olympic Games
