= 2025 World Aquatics Swimming World Cup =

Swimming tournament

The 2025 World Aquatics Swimming World Cup was a series of three-day meets in three cities in October 2025. This edition is held in the short course (25-meter pool) format.

== Meets ==
The 2025 World Aquatics Swimming World Cup consisted of the following three meets. These are mainly held in North America.

Meet	Dates	Location	Venue	Result
1	10–12 October	Carmel, United States	Carmel High School Natatorium	
2	17–19 October	Westmont, United States	FMC Natatorium	
3	23–25 October	Toronto, Canada	Toronto Pan Am Sports Centre	

== World Cup standings ==
=== Men ===
Rank	Swimmer	Points awarded			Total
Rank	Swimmer	(United States)	(United States)	(Canada)	Total
1st place, gold medalist(s)	Hubert Kós (HUN)	58.4	58	59.4	175.8
2nd place, silver medalist(s)	Shaine Casas (USA)	53.8	58.5	58.9	171.2
3rd place, bronze medalist(s)	Caspar Corbeau (NED)	55.8	56.3	58.9	171
4	Ilya Kharun (CAN)	55.4	57.7	56.1	169.2
5	Carson Foster (USA)	55.4	49.8	53.4	158.6
6	Noè Ponti (SUI)	53.6	54.1	47.8	155.5
7	Chris Guiliano (USA)	53	46.7	46.4	146.1
8	Thomas Ceccon (ITA)	42.3	49.2	48.4	139.9
9	Josh Liendo (CAN)	26.9	45.2	59	131.1
10	Kacper Stokowski (POL)	42.9	41.1	43.7	127.7

=== Women ===
Rank	Swimmer	Points awarded			Total
Rank	Swimmer	(United States)	(United States)	(Canada)	Total
1st place, gold medalist(s)	Kate Douglass (USA)	58.9	59.1	59.5	177.5
2nd place, silver medalist(s)	Gretchen Walsh (USA)	59.1	59	59.2	177.3
3rd place, bronze medalist(s)	Kaylee McKeown (AUS)	56.8	56.9	59.6	173.3
4	Lani Pallister (AUS)	56.5	57	57.5	171
5	Regan Smith (USA)	56.7	57.7	55.4	169.8
6	Mollie O'Callaghan (AUS)	54.5	52.8	53.5	160.8
7	Alexandria Perkins (AUS)	51	50.9	47.4	149.3
8	Erika Fairweather (NZL)	48.2	48.6	49.7	146.5
9	Ellen Walshe (IRL)	42.9	49.3	53.5	145.7
10	Mona McSharry (IRL)	39.1	49.5	48.8	137.4

=== Absences in participation ===
Siobhan Haughey and Beata Nelson did not compete this season, though they had appeared in previous seasons.

Summer McIntosh was scheduled to participate in the Carmel event but later canceled her appearance because of illness. She has officially chosen to withdraw from all remaining events in this edition of the Swimming World Cup, which might have signified her international debut with Bob Bowman. She later went on to complete at the U.S. Open in Austin, Texas following her withdrawal.

Had McIntosh participated in the Carmel leg, she would have won the 400 freestyle, 200 backstroke, 200 butterfly, and individual medleys this season, and she would have competed in the SWC for the first time since the 2022 edition. She would have also become one of the Canadians to win the overall title in the SWC, joining Mark Tewksbury, who dominated backstroke events in the 1991 edition.

== Event winners ==
In summary, of the total number of 102 events across three meets, the United States (including those representing U.S swimming club (CLB)) won 43 events, followed by Australia winning 19 events and Canada and Hungary each with victories in 10 events.

=== 50 m freestyle ===
Meet	Men		Women	
Meet	Winner	Time	Winner	Time
Carmel	Chris Guiliano (USA)	20.83	Katarzyna Wasick (POL)	23.29
Westmont	Ilya Kharun (CAN)	20.72	Katarzyna Wasick (POL)	23.30
Toronto	Josh Liendo (CAN)	20.31 WC	Katarzyna Wasick (POL)	23.21

=== 100 m freestyle ===
Meet	Men		Women	
Meet	Winner	Time	Winner	Time
Carmel	Jack Alexy (USA)	45.32	Kate Douglass (USA)	50.83
Westmont	Jack Alexy (USA)	45.84	Kate Douglass (USA)	50.19 WR
Toronto	Josh Liendo (CAN)	45.30	Kate Douglass (USA)	49.93 WR

=== 200 m freestyle ===
Meet	Men		Women	
Meet	Winner	Time	Winner	Time
Carmel	Luke Hobson (USA)	1:41.19	Mollie O'Callaghan (AUS)	1:50.77
Westmont	Luke Hobson (USA)	1:40.62	Mollie O'Callaghan (AUS)	1:49.77 WR
Toronto	Luke Hobson (USA)	1:39.94	Mollie O'Callaghan (AUS)	1:49.36 WR

=== 400 m freestyle ===
Meet	Men		Women	
Meet	Winner	Time	Winner	Time
Carmel	Carson Foster (USA)	3:37.80	Lani Pallister (AUS)	3:54.38
Westmont	Samuel Short (AUS)	3:36.27	Lani Pallister (AUS)	3:52.42 WC
Toronto	Carson Foster (USA)	3:36.52	Lani Pallister (AUS)	3:51.87 OC, WC

=== 800 m freestyle ===
Meet	Men		Women	
Meet	Winner	Time	Winner	Time
Carmel	—N/a		Lani Pallister (AUS)	8:02.02
Westmont	Zalán Sárkány (HUN)	7:29.50 WC	—N/a	
Toronto	—N/a		Lani Pallister (AUS)	7:54.00 WR

=== 1500 m freestyle ===
Meet	Men		Women	
Meet	Winner	Time	Winner	Time
Carmel	Samuel Short (AUS)	14:30.00	—N/a	
Westmont	—N/a		Lani Pallister (AUS)	15:13.83
Toronto	Samuel Short (AUS)	14:35.33	—N/a	

=== 50 m backstroke ===
Meet	Men		Women	
Meet	Winner	Time	Winner	Time
Carmel	Hubert Kós (HUN)	22.65	Kaylee McKeown (AUS)	25.42
Westmont	Hubert Kós (HUN)	22.91	Kaylee McKeown (AUS)	25.63
Toronto	Hubert Kós (HUN)	22.67	Kaylee McKeown (AUS)	25.35 OC, WC

=== 100 m backstroke ===
Meet	Men		Women	
Meet	Winner	Time	Winner	Time
Carmel	Hubert Kós (HUN)	49.08	Regan Smith (USA)	54.92
Westmont	Hubert Kós (HUN)	48.78 WC	Regan Smith (USA)	54.02 =WR
Toronto	Hubert Kós (HUN)	48.16 WR	Kaylee McKeown (AUS)	54.49 OC

=== 200 m backstroke ===
Meet	Men		Women	
Meet	Winner	Time	Winner	Time
Carmel	Hubert Kós (HUN)	1:46.84	Kaylee McKeown (AUS)	1:58.86
Westmont	Hubert Kós (HUN)	1:47.51	Kaylee McKeown (AUS)	1:57.87 WR
Toronto	Hubert Kós (HUN)	1:45.12 WR	Kaylee McKeown (AUS)	1:57.33 WR

=== 50 m breaststroke ===
Meet	Men		Women	
Meet	Winner	Time	Winner	Time
Carmel	Chris Smith (RSA)	25.75	Eneli Jefimova (EST)	29.33
Westmont	Caspar Corbeau (NED)	25.52	Mona McSharry (IRL)	29.59
Toronto	Caspar Corbeau (NED)	25.77	Florine Gaspard (BEL)	29.48

=== 100 m breaststroke ===
Meet	Men		Women	
Meet	Winner	Time	Winner	Time
Carmel	Caspar Corbeau (NED)	56.67	Kate Douglass (USA)	1:02.90
Westmont	Ilya Shymanovich (ANA)	56.41	Kate Douglass (USA)	1:03.14
Toronto	Caspar Corbeau (NED)	55.55 WC	Kate Douglass (USA)	1:02.93

=== 200 m breaststroke ===
Meet	Men		Women	
Meet	Winner	Time	Winner	Time
Carmel	Caspar Corbeau (NED)	2:01.63	Kate Douglass (USA)	2:13.97
Westmont	Caspar Corbeau (NED)	2:01.68	Kate Douglass (USA)	2:14.57
Toronto	Caspar Corbeau (NED)	1:59.52 WR	Kate Douglass (USA)	2:13.45

=== 50 m butterfly ===
Meet	Men		Women	
Meet	Winner	Time	Winner	Time
Carmel	Ilya Kharun (CAN)	21.86	Gretchen Walsh (USA)	23.72 WR
Westmont	Ilya Kharun (CAN)	21.69	Gretchen Walsh (USA)	23.90
Toronto	Ilya Kharun (CAN)	21.80	Gretchen Walsh (USA)	23.91

=== 100 m butterfly ===
Meet	Men		Women	
Meet	Winner	Time	Winner	Time
Carmel	Noè Ponti (SUI)	48.53	Gretchen Walsh (USA)	53.69 WC
Westmont	Noè Ponti (SUI)	48.47	Gretchen Walsh (USA)	53.72
Toronto	Josh Liendo (CAN)	47.68 WR	Gretchen Walsh (USA)	53.10 WC

=== 200 m butterfly ===
Meet	Men		Women	
Meet	Winner	Time	Winner	Time
Carmel	Ilya Kharun (CAN)	1:50.65	Regan Smith (USA)	2:00.28 WC
Westmont	Ilya Kharun (CAN)	1:48.46 WC	Regan Smith (USA)	2:00.20 WC
Toronto	Ilya Kharun (CAN)	1:49.71	Regan Smith (USA)	2:00.34

=== 100 m individual medley ===
Meet	Men		Women	
Meet	Winner	Time	Winner	Time
Carmel	Shaine Casas (USA)	50.86	Gretchen Walsh (USA)	55.91 WC
Westmont	Shaine Casas (USA)	50.45	Gretchen Walsh (USA)	55.77 WC
Toronto	Shaine Casas (USA)	50.28	Gretchen Walsh (USA)	55.99

=== 200 m individual medley ===
Meet	Men		Women	
Meet	Winner	Time	Winner	Time
Carmel	Shaine Casas (USA)	1:49.43 AM	Alex Walsh (USA)	2:04.76
Westmont	Shaine Casas (USA)	1:50.08	Alex Walsh (USA)	2:04.44
Toronto	Shaine Casas (USA)	1:49.79	Alex Walsh (USA)	2:04.01

=== 400 m individual medley ===
Meet	Men		Women	
Meet	Winner	Time	Winner	Time
Carmel	Carson Foster (USA)	3:59.58	Abbie Wood (GBR)	4:27.14
Westmont	Shaine Casas (USA)	3:57.41	Ellen Walshe (IRL)	4:25.33
Toronto	Shaine Casas (USA)	3:56.13 WC	Ellen Walshe (IRL)	4:22.97
