= 2024 United States Olympic trials (swimming) =

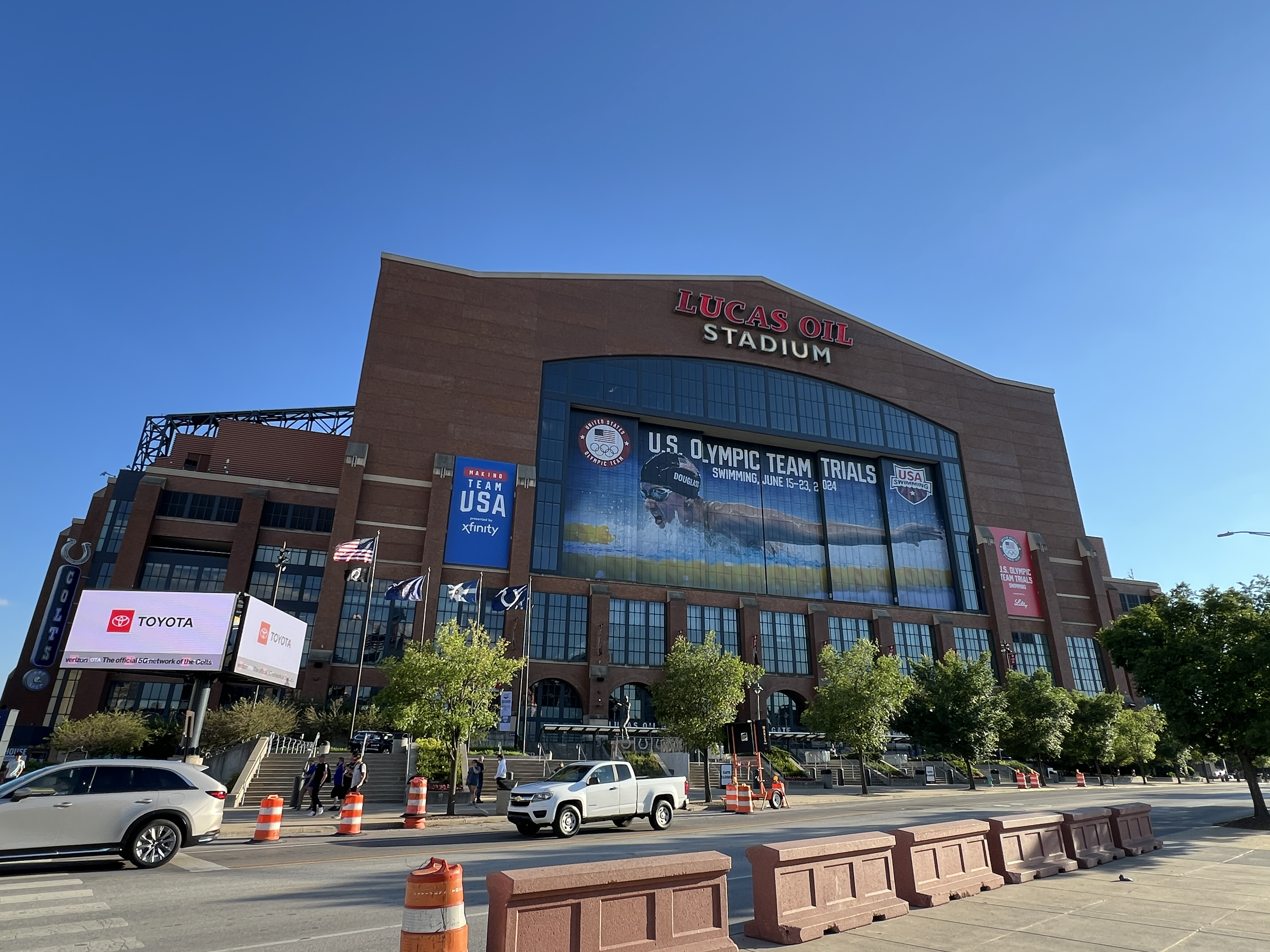
- Host city: Indianapolis, Indiana, U.S.
- Date: June 15 – 23, 2024
- Venue: Lucas Oil Stadium
- Events: 28 (men: 14; women: 14)

The 2024 USA Swimming Olympic trials were held at Lucas Oil Stadium in Indianapolis, Indiana, from June 15 to 23, 2024. The meet served as the National Championships in swimming for the United States and the qualifier for swimming at the 2024 Summer Olympics in Paris, France.

== Schedule ==
Key: (H): heats, (SF): semi-finals, (F): finals

Date	Event	
Date	Morning	Evening
June 15, 2024	Women's 100 butterfly (H); Women's 400 freestyle (H); Men's 100 breaststroke (H); Men's 400 freestyle (H)	Women's 100 butterfly (SF); Men's 400 freestyle (F); Women's 400 freestyle (F); Men's 100 breaststroke (SF)
June 16, 2024	Men's 200 freestyle (H); Men's 400 IM (H); Women's 100 breaststroke (H); Men's 100 backstroke (H); Women's 200 freestyle (H)	Men's 400 IM (F); Women's 100 butterfly (F); Men's 200 freestyle (SF); Women's 100 breaststroke (SF); Men's 100 backstroke (SF); Men's 100 breaststroke (F); Women's 200 freestyle (SF)
June 17, 2024	Women's 400 IM (H); Women's 100 backstroke (H); Men's 800 freestyle (H)	Women's 400 IM (F); Men's 200 freestyle (F); Women's 100 backstroke (SF); Men's 100 backstroke (F); Women's 100 breaststroke (F); Women's 200 freestyle (F)
June 18, 2024	Men's 200 butterfly (H); Men's 100 freestyle (H); Women's 1500 freestyle (H); Women's 100 freestyle (H); Men's 200 breaststroke (H)	Men's 100 freestyle (SF); Men's 200 butterfly (SF); Women's 100 backstroke (F); Men's 800 freestyle (F); Women's 100 freestyle (SF); Men's 200 breaststroke (SF)
June 19, 2024	Women's 200 breaststroke (H); Men's 200 backstroke (H); Women's 200 butterfly (H)	Women's 100 freestyle (F); Men's 200 butterfly (F); Women's 200 butterfly (SF); Women's 1500 freestyle (F); Men's 200 backstroke (SF); Women's 200 breaststroke (SF); Men's 200 breaststroke (F); Men's 100 freestyle (F)
June 20, 2024	Women's 200 backstroke (H); Men's 50 freestyle (H); Men's 200 IM (H)	Women's 200 butterfly (F); Men's 200 backstroke (F); Men's 50 freestyle (SF); Women's 200 breaststroke (F); Women's 200 backstroke (SF); Men's 200 IM (SF)
June 21, 2024	Men's 100 butterfly (H); Women's 200 IM (H); Women's 800 freestyle (H)	Men's 50 freestyle (F); Women's 200 backstroke (F); Men's 200 IM (F); Men's 100 butterfly (SF); Women's 200 IM (SF)
June 22, 2024	Women's 50 freestyle (H); Men's 1500 freestyle (H)	Men's 100 butterfly (F); Women's 50 freestyle (SF); Women's 200 IM (F); Women's 800 freestyle (F)
June 23, 2024	—	Women's 50 freestyle (F); Men's 1500 freestyle (F)

== Results ==
Key: Highlighted swimmers achieved the qualification conditions to be included in the Olympic team in that respective event.

=== Men's events ===
Event	Gold		Silver		Bronze	
50 m freestyle	Caeleb Dressel	21.41	Chris Guiliano	21.69	Matt King	21.70
100 m freestyle	Chris Guiliano	47.38	Jack Alexy	47.47	Caeleb Dressel	47.53
200 m freestyle	Luke Hobson	1:44.89	Chris Guiliano	1:45.38	Drew Kibler	1:45.60
400 m freestyle	Aaron Shackell	3:45.46	Kieran Smith	3:45.76	David Johnston	3:46.19
800 m freestyle	Bobby Finke	7:44.22	Luke Whitlock	7:45.19	Daniel Matheson	7:49.34
1500 m freestyle	Bobby Finke	14:40.28 CR	David Johnston	14:52.74	Luke Whitlock	14:53.00
100 m backstroke	Ryan Murphy	52.22	Hunter Armstrong	52.72	Jack Aikins	52.74
200 m backstroke	Ryan Murphy	1:54.33	Keaton Jones	1:54.61	Jack Aikins	1:54.78
100 m breaststroke	Nic Fink	59.08	Charlie Swanson	59.16	Josh Matheny	59.23
200 m breaststroke	Matthew Fallon	2:06.54 AR, US, CR	Josh Matheny	2:08.86	Ananias Pouch	2:09.05
100 m butterfly	Caeleb Dressel	50.19	Thomas Heilman	50.80	Dare Rose	50.84
200 m butterfly	Thomas Heilman	1:54.50	Luca Urlando	1:55.08	Mason Laur	1:55.37
200 m IM	Carson Foster	1:55.65	Shaine Casas	1:55.83	Kieran Smith	1:56.97
400 m IM	Carson Foster	4:07.64	Chase Kalisz	4:09.39	Jay Litherland	4:12.34

=== Women's events ===
Event	Gold		Silver		Bronze	
50 m freestyle	Simone Manuel	24.13	Gretchen Walsh	24.15	Abbey Weitzeil	24.26
100 m freestyle	Kate Douglass	52.56	Torri Huske	52.93	Gretchen Walsh	53.13
200 m freestyle	Katie Ledecky	1:55.22	Claire Weinstein	1:56.18	Paige Madden	1:56.36
400 m freestyle	Katie Ledecky	3:58.35 CR	Paige Madden	4:02.08	Jillian Cox	4:06.89
800 m freestyle	Katie Ledecky	8:14.12	Paige Madden	8:20.71	Jillian Cox	8:22.97
1500 m freestyle	Katie Ledecky	15:37.35	Katie Grimes	15:57.77	Ashley Twichell	16:08.07
100 m backstroke	Regan Smith	57.13 WR	Katharine Berkoff	57.91	Kennedy Noble	58.81
200 m backstroke	Regan Smith	2:05.16	Phoebe Bacon	2:06.27	Claire Curzan	2:06.34
100 m breaststroke	Lilly King	1:05.43	Emma Weber	1:06.10	Lydia Jacoby	1:06.37
200 m breaststroke	Kate Douglass	2:19.46 CR	Lilly King	2:21.93	Alex Walsh	2:22.38
100 m butterfly	Gretchen Walsh	55.31	Torri Huske	55.52	Regan Smith	55.62
200 m butterfly	Regan Smith	2:05.70	Alex Shackell	2:06.69	Lindsay Looney	2:07:03
200 m IM	Kate Douglass	2:06.79 US, CR	Alex Walsh	2:07.86	Isabel Ivey	2:10.09
400 m IM	Katie Grimes	4:35.00	Emma Weyant	4:35.56	Lilla Bognar	4:37.86

=== Freestyle relay qualifiers ===
Key: Highlighted swimmers achieved the qualification conditions to be included in the Olympic team in that respective relay event based on their
performance in the corresponding 100 meter or 200 meter freestyle individual event. Erika Connolly and Catie DeLoof tied for sixth place in the
Women's 100 meter freestyle. Connolly won a swim-off to break the tie. Swim-off results are shown below in parentheses.

==== Men ====
Place →	1st	2nd	3rd	4th	5th	6th	7th	8th
4×100 m freestyle	Chris Guiliano; 47.38	Jack Alexy; 47.47	Caeleb Dressel; 47.53	Hunter Armstrong; 47.78	Ryan Held; 47.82	Matt King; 47.94	Destin Lasco; 48.14	Macguire McDuff; 48.64
4×200 m freestyle	Luke Hobson; 1:44.89	Chris Guiliano; 1:45.38	Drew Kibler; 1:45.60	Kieran Smith; 1:45.61	Brooks Curry; 1:45.89	Blake Pieroni; 1:46.09	Jake Mitchell; 1:46.48	Aaron Shackell; 1:47.37

==== Women ====
Place →	1st	2nd	3rd	4th	5th	6th	7th	8th
4×100 m freestyle	Kate Douglass; 52.56	Torri Huske; 52.93	Gretchen Walsh; 53.13	Simone Manuel; 53.25	Abbey Weitzeil; 53.70	Erika Connolly; 53.86 (53.76)	Catie DeLoof; 53.86 (53.80)	Beata Nelson; 54.00
4×200 m freestyle	Katie Ledecky; 1:55.22	Claire Weinstein; 1:56.18	Paige Madden; 1:56.36	Erin Gemmell; 1:56.75	Anna Peplowski; 1:57.04	Alex Shackell; 1:57.05	Simone Manuel; 1:57.13	Katie Grimes; 1:57.33

== U.S. Olympic Team ==
The following swimmers qualified to compete at the 2024 Summer Olympics (for pool events):

=== Men ===
Jack Alexy, Hunter Armstrong, Shaine Casas, Brooks Curry, Caeleb Dressel, Matthew Fallon, Nic Fink, Bobby Finke, Carson Foster, Chris Guiliano, Thomas Heilman, Ryan Held, Luke Hobson, David Johnston, Keaton Jones, Chase Kalisz, Drew Kibler, Matthew King, Josh Matheny, Ryan Murphy, Blake Pieroni, Aaron Shackell, Kieran Smith, Charlie Swanson, Luca Urlando, Luke Whitlock

=== Women ===
Phoebe Bacon, Katharine Berkoff, Erika Connolly, Kate Douglass, Erin Gemmell, Katie Grimes, Torri Huske, Lilly King, Katie Ledecky, Paige Madden, Simone Manuel, Anna Peplowski, Alex Shackell, Regan Smith, Alex Walsh, Gretchen Walsh, Emma Weber, Claire Weinstein, Abbey Weitzeil, Emma Weyant

== Sponsorship ==
Eli Lilly and Company is the sponsor of the 2024 United States Olympic trials in swimming.

== Television coverage ==
The event was broadcast on NBC and was also streamed on Peacock, NBCSports.com and the NBC Sports app.

== Attendance Records ==
The 2024 U.S. Olympic Team Trials – Swimming, held at Lucas Oil Stadium in Indianapolis, achieved record-breaking attendance numbers. On June 15, 20,689 attendees set a new record for the largest gathering at a swim meet. The event continued to break records with 17,697 fans attending the prelims session and a peak of 22,209 attendees later in the week. Overall, the trials welcomed over 285,000 fans, marking a significant increase from previous events.
