= 2025 NCAA Division I Men's Swimming and Diving Championships =

- Host city: (Washington (state)) Federal Way, Washington
- Date: March 26–29, 2025
- Venue(s): Weyerhaeuser King County Aquatic Center; Washington State University

The 2025 NCAA Division I Men's Swimming and Diving Championships was contested March 26–29, 2025 at the 101st annual NCAA-sanctioned swim meet to determine the team and individual national champions of Division I men's collegiate swimming and diving in the United States.

This year's events are being hosted by Washington State University at the Weyerhaeuser King County Aquatic Center in Federal Way, Washington.

== Team standings ==
- Note: Top 10 only
- (H) = Hosts
- ^{(DC)} = Defending champions

Rank	Team	Points
1st place, gold medalist(s)	Texas	490
2nd place, silver medalist(s)	California	471
3rd place, bronze medalist(s)	Indiana	459
4	Florida	315
5	Tennessee	266.5
6	Arizona State^{(DC)}	248
7	Georgia	238.5
8	Stanford	216
9	NC State	178
10	Virginia Tech	107.5

== Swimming results ==
Full Results

Event	Gold		Silver		Bronze	
50 freestyle	Jordan Crooks; Tennessee	17.91	Josh Liendo; Florida	18.23	Guilherme Caribé; Tennessee	18.26
100 freestyle	Josh Liendo; Florida	39.99	Jordan Crooks; Tennessee	40.06	Guilherme Caribé; Tennessee	40.15
200 freestyle	Luke Hobson; Texas	1:28.33; US, AR	Chris Guiliano; Texas	1:29.42	Gabriel Jett; California	1:30.08
500 freestyle	Rex Maurer; Texas	4:05.35	Luke Hobson; Texas	4:06.34	Lucas Henveaux; California	4:06.74
1650 freestyle	Zalan Sarkany; Indiana	14:21.29	Rex Maurer; Texas	14:25.22	Lucas Henveaux; California	14:27.62
100 backstroke	Hubert Kos; Texas	43.20; US	Jonny Marshall; Florida	43.22	Ruard van Renen; Georgia	43.85
200 backstroke	Hubert Kos; Texas	1:34.21; US	Destin Lasco; California	1:36.41	Gabriel Jett; California	1:36.76
100 breaststroke	Julian Smith; Florida	49.55	Denis Petrashov; Louisville	50.27	Nate Germonprez; Texas	50.29
200 breaststroke	Jassen Yep; Indiana	1:48.30	Matthew Fallon; Pennsylvania	1:48.87	Carles Coll Marti; Virginia Tech	1:48.89
100 butterfly	Josh Liendo; Florida	43.06	Ilya Kharun; Arizona State	43.43	Luca Urlando; Georgia	43.49
200 butterfly	Luca Urlando; Georgia	1:36.43; US, AR	Dare Rose; California	1:38.04	Ilya Kharun; Arizona State	1:38.74
200 IM	Hubert Kos; Texas	1:37.91	Destin Lasco; California	1:37.98	Owen McDonald; Indiana	1:39.42
400 IM	Rex Maurer; Texas	3:34.00	Tristan Jankovics; Ohio State	3:34.98	Lucas Henveaux; California	3:36.22
200 freestyle relay	Tennessee; Jordan Crooks (17.82); Guilherme Caribé (17.81); Nikoli Blackman (18.67); Lamar Taylor (18.54)	1:12.84; MR	Arizona State; Ilya Kharun (18.39); Tommy Palmer (18.17); Patrick Sammon (18.35); Jonny Kulow (18.14)	1:13.05	Florida; Josh Liendo (18.24); Julian Smith (18.25); Alexander Painter (18.40); Scott Buff (18.48)	1:13.37
400 freestyle relay	Tennessee; Guilherme Caribé (40.57); Lamar Taylor (41.02); Nikoli Blackman (41.35); Jordan Crooks (39.36)	2:42.30; US	Arizona State; Ilya Kharun (41.24); Patrick Sammon (40.55); Tommy Palmer (41.50); Jonny Kulow (39.93)	2:43.22	Florida; Josh Liendo (40.42); Julian Smith (40.96); Alexander Painter (41.18); Scott Buff (41.46)	2:44.02
800 freestyle relay	California; Jack Alexy (1:30.02); Gabriel Jett (1:29.16); Destin Lasco (1:29.10); Lucas Henveaux (1:31.47)	5:59.75; US	Texas; Luke Hobson (1:28.90); Chris Guiliano (1:30.13); Rex Maurer (1:29.91); Coby Carrozza (1:31.14)	6:00.08; AR	Georgia; Tomas Koski (1:30.90); Luca Urlando (1:30.59); Jake Magahey (1:30.70); Reese Branzell (1:33.83)	6:06.02
200 medley relay	Texas; Will Modglin (20.32); Nate Germonprez (22.83); Hubert Kos (19.33); Chris Guiliano (17.80)	1:20.28	Tennessee; Lamar Taylor (20.74); Kevin Houseman (23.04); Guilherme Caribé (19.05); Jordan Crooks (17.67)	1:20.50	California; Bjorn Seeliger (20.57); Yamato Okadome (22.77); Dare Rose (19.39); Jack Alexy (18.03)	1:20.76
400 medley relay	Florida; Jonny Marshall (43.87); Julian Smith (48.85); Josh Liendo (42.46); Alexander Painter (40.92)	2:56.10; MR	Texas; Will Modglin (44.37); Nate Germonprez (50.49); Hubert Kos (43.45); Luke Hobson (40.64)	2:58.95	Arizona State; Jack Wadsworth (45.25); Andy Dobrzanski (50.78); Ilya Kharun (42.83); Jonny Kulow (40.11)	2:58.97

Legend: US – U.S. Open record; MR – Meet record; AR – American record;

== Diving results ==
Event	Gold		Silver		Bronze	
1 m diving	Quentin Henninger; Indiana	434.65	Jack Ryan; Stanford	417.45	Moritz Wesemann; USC	404.30
3 m diving	Carson Tyler; Indiana	467.45	Quentin Henninger; Indiana	466.15	Jack Ryan; Stanford	457.90
Platform diving	Carson Tyler; Indiana	480.45	Jaxon Bowshire; Texas A&M	450.80	Kaden Springfield; Purdue	408.50

== See also ==
- List of college swimming and diving teams
- 2025 NCAA Division I Women's Swimming and Diving Championships
