= List of United States records in swimming =

There are two different kinds of swimming records in the United States and certified by USA Swimming:

- American record: the fastest time by an American swimmer.
- U.S. Open record: the fastest time within the United States.

Note: The American records should not be confused with the Americas records, which are the fastest times ever swum by a swimmer representing any country of the Americas.

== Long course (50 m) ==
=== Men ===
Event	American Record (50 m)	U.S. Open Record (50 m)
freestyle
50 free	21.04; Caeleb Dressel (USA); 2019 World Championships; July 27, 2019 / Gwangju, South Korea 21.04; Caeleb Dressel (Gator Swim Club); 2020 US Olympic Trials; June 20, 2021 / Omaha, Nebraska	21.04; Caeleb Dressel (Gator Swim Club); 2020 US Olympic Trials; June 20, 2021 / Omaha, Nebraska
100 free	46.81; Jack Alexy (USA); 2025 World Championships (sf); July 30, 2025 / Singapore, Singapore	46.99; Jack Alexy (California Aquatics); 2025 USA Championships (p); June 3, 2025 / Indianapolis, Indiana
200 free	1:42.96; Michael Phelps (USA); 2008 Olympic Games; August 12, 2008 / Beijing, China	1:43.73; Luke Hobson (Longhorn Aquatics); 2025 USA Championships; June 4, 2025 / Indianapolis, Indiana
400 free	3:42.78; Larsen Jensen (USA); 2008 Olympic Games; August 10, 2008 / Beijing, China	3:40.52; Samuel Short (Australia); 2026 Pan Pacific Championships; August 14, 2026 / Irvine, California
800 free	7:38.67; Bobby Finke (USA); 2023 World Championships; July 26, 2023 / Fukuoka, Japan	7:37.02; Samuel Short (Australia); 2026 Pan Pacific Championships; August 12, 2026 / Irvine, California
1500 free	14:30.67; Bobby Finke (USA); 2024 Olympic Games; August 4, 2024 / Paris, France	14:33.97; Samuel Short (Australia); 2026 Pan Pacific Championships; August 15, 2026 / Irvine, California
backstroke	American Record (50 m)	U.S. Open Record (50 m)
50 back	23.71; Hunter Armstrong (Ohio State); 2022 USA International Team Trials; April 28, 2022 / Greensboro, North Carolina	same
100 back	51.85; Ryan Murphy (USA); 2016 Olympic Games (r); August 13, 2016 / Rio de Janeiro, Brazil	51.94; Aaron Peirsol (Longhorn Aquatics); 2009 USA Championships; July 8, 2009 / Indianapolis, Indiana
200 back	1:51.92^{+} Aaron Peirsol (USA); 2009 World Championships; July 31, 2009 / Rome, Italy	1:53.08; Aaron Peirsol (Longhorn Aquatics); 2009 USA Championships; July 11, 2009 / Indianapolis, Indiana
breaststroke	American Record (50 m)	U.S. Open Record (50 m)
50 breast	26.30; Van Mathias (Indiana); 2026 USA Swimming Pro Swim Series; June 17, 2026 / Indianapolis, Indiana	same
100 breast	58.01; Van Mathias (Indiana); 2026 USA Swimming Pro Swim Series; June 20, 2026 / Indianapolis, Indiana	same
200 breast	2:06.54; Matthew Fallon (University of Pennsylvania); 2024 US Olympic Trials; June 19, 2024 / Indianapolis, Indiana	same
butterfly	American Record (50 m)	U.S. Open Record (50 m)
50 fly	22.35; Caeleb Dressel (USA); 2019 World Championships; July 22, 2019 / Gwangju, South Korea	22.59 (Canada) Ilya Kharun (Sun Devil Swimming)^{[A]} 2026 USA Championships; July 29, 2026 / Irvine, California
100 fly	49.45^{+} Caeleb Dressel (USA); 2020 Olympic Games; July 31, 2021 / Tokyo, Japan	49.76; Caeleb Dressel (Gator Swim Club); 2020 US Olympic Trials (sf); June 18, 2021 / Omaha, Nebraska
200 fly	1:51.51; Michael Phelps (USA); 2009 World Championships; July 29, 2009 / Rome, Italy	1:52.20; Michael Phelps (Club Wolverine); 2008 US Olympic Trials; July 2, 2008 / Omaha, Nebraska
individual medley	American Record (50 m)	U.S. Open Record (50 m)
200 IM	1:54.00; Ryan Lochte (USA); 2011 World Championships; July 28, 2011 / Shanghai, China	1:54.43; Ryan Lochte (USA); 2010 Pan Pacific Championships; August 21, 2010 / Irvine, California
400 IM	4:03.84; Michael Phelps (USA); 2008 Olympic Games; August 10, 2008 / Beijing, China	4:05.25; Michael Phelps (Club Wolverine); 2008 US Olympic Trials; June 29, 2008 / Omaha, Nebraska
relays	American Record (50 m)	U.S. Open Record (50 m)
400 free relay	3:08.24^{+} USA; Michael Phelps (47.51); Garrett Weber-Gale (47.02); Cullen Jones (47.65); Jason Lezak (46.06); 2008 Olympic Games; August 11, 2008 / Beijing, China	3:09.01; USA; Chris Guiliano (47.51); Patrick Sammon (46.98); Destin Lasco (47.74); Jack Alexy (46.78); 2026 Pan Pacific Championships; August 14, 2026 / Irvine, California
800 free relay	6:58.55^{+} USA; Michael Phelps (1:44.49); Ricky Berens (1:44.13); David Walters (1:45.47); Ryan Lochte (1:44.46); 2009 World Championships; July 31, 2009 / Rome, Italy	6:59.37; USA; Luke Hobson (1:44.13); Aaron Shackell (1:44.23); Patrick Sammon (1:46.92); Gabriel Jett (1:44.09); 2026 Pan Pacific Championships; August 13, 2026 / Irvine, California
400 medley relay	3:26.78^{+} USA; Ryan Murphy (52.31); Michael Andrew (58.49); Caeleb Dressel (49.03); Zach Apple (46.95); 2020 Olympic Games; August 1, 2021 / Tokyo, Japan	3:29.06; USA; Will Modglin (53.86); Van Mathias (57.72); Luca Urlando (50.51); Jack Alexy (46.97); 2026 Pan Pacific Championships; August 15, 2026 / Irvine, California

Legend: + – World record; * – Record awaiting ratification by USA Swimming;
Records not set in finals: p – preliminary; sf – semifinal; r – relay 1st leg; rh – relay heat 1st leg; b – B final; † – en route to final mark; tt – time trial;

=== Women ===
Event	American Record (50 m)	U.S. Open Record (50 m)
freestyle
50 free	23.19^{+} Kate Douglass (USA); 2026 Pan Pacific Championships; August 15, 2026 / Irvine, California	same
100 free	51.69; Kate Douglass (USA); 2026 Pan Pacific Championships (r); August 14, 2026 / Irvine, California	same
200 free	1:53.61; Allison Schmitt (USA); 2012 Olympic Games; July 31, 2012 / London, UK	1:53.67; Lani Pallister (Australia); 2026 Pan Pacific Championships; August 12, 2026 / Irvine, California
400 free	3:56.46; Katie Ledecky (USA); 2016 Olympic Games; August 7, 2016 / Rio de Janeiro, Brazil	3:55.37 (Canada) Summer McIntosh (Longhorn Aquatics); 2025 U.S. Open; December 4, 2025 / Austin, Texas
800 free	8:04.12^{+} Katie Ledecky (Gator Swim Club); 2025 TYR Pro Swim Series; May 3, 2025 / Fort Lauderdale, Florida	same
1500 free	15:20.48^{+} Katie Ledecky (USA); 2018 TYR Pro Swim Series; May 16, 2018 / Indianapolis, Indiana	same
backstroke	American Record (50 m)	U.S. Open Record (50 m)
50 back	26.90; Katharine Berkoff (USA); 2026 Pan Pacific Championships; August 13, 2026 / Irvine, California	same
100 back	57.13^{+} Regan Smith (Longhorn Aquatics); 2024 US Olympic Trials; June 19, 2024 / Indianapolis, Indiana	same
200 back	2:03.35; Regan Smith (USA); 2019 World Championships (sf); July 26, 2019 / Gwangju, South Korea	2:03.80; Regan Smith (Sun Devil); 2023 USA Championships; June 28, 2023 / Indianapolis, Indiana
breaststroke	American Record (50 m)	U.S. Open Record (50 m)
50 breast	29.40; Lilly King (USA); 2017 World Championships; July 30, 2017 / Budapest, Hungary	29.59; Tang Qianting (China); 2026 Pan Pacific Championships (p); August 14, 2026 / Irvine, California
100 breast	1:04.13^{+} Lilly King (USA); 2017 World Championships; July 25, 2017 / Budapest, Hungary	1:04.45; Jessica Hardy (Trojan Swim Club); 2009 U.S. Open Championships; August 7, 2009 / Federal Way, Washington
200 breast	2:18.50; Kate Douglass (USA); 2025 World Championships; August 1, 2025 / Singapore, Singapore	2:19.30; Kate Douglass (New York Aquatic Club); 2024 TYR Pro Swim Series; January 13, 2024 / Knoxville, Tennessee
butterfly	American Record (50 m)	U.S. Open Record (50 m)
50 fly	24.51; Gretchen Walsh (USA); 2026 Sette Colli Trophy; June 26, 2026 / Rome, Italy	24.65; Gretchen Walsh (USA); 2026 Pan Pacific Championships; August 12, 2026 / Irvine, California
100 fly	54.33^{+} Gretchen Walsh (New York Athletic Club); 2026 Fort Lauderdale Open; May 2, 2026 / Fort Lauderdale, Florida	same
200 fly	2:03.84; Regan Smith (USA); 2024 Olympic Games; August 1, 2024 / Paris, France	2:02.62 (Canada) Summer McIntosh (Longhorn Aquatics); 2025 U.S. Open; December 6, 2025 / Austin, Texas
individual medley	American Record (50 m)	U.S. Open Record (50 m)
200 IM	2:06.15; Ariana Kukors (USA); 2009 World Championships; July 27, 2009 / Rome, Italy	2:06.79; Kate Douglass (New York Aquatic Club); 2024 US Olympic Trials; June 22, 2024 / Indianapolis, Indiana
400 IM	4:31.12; Katie Hoff (North Baltimore); 2008 US Olympic Trials; June 29, 2008 / Omaha, Nebraska	4:26.98; Summer McIntosh (Canada); 2025 TYR Pro Swim Series; March 7, 2025 / Westmont, Illinois
relays	American Record (50 m)	U.S. Open Record (50 m)
400 free relay	3:29.32; USA; Kate Douglass (51.69); Gretchen Walsh (52.23); Torri Huske (52.79); Simone Manuel (52.61); 2026 Pan Pacific Championships; August 14, 2026 / Irvine, California	same
800 free relay	7:40.01; USA; Claire Weinstein (1:54.83); Anna Peplowski (1:54.75); Erin Gemmell (1:56.72); Katie Ledecky (1:53.71); 2025 World Championships; July 31, 2025 / Singapore, Singapore	7:42.40; Australia; Inez Miller (1:55.83); Lani Pallister (1:53.46); Hannah Casey (1:57.84); Milla Jansen (1:55.27); 2026 Pan Pacific Championships; August 13, 2026 / Irvine, California
400 medley relay	3:49.34^{+} USA; Regan Smith (57.57); Kate Douglass (1:04.27); Gretchen Walsh (54.98); Torri Huske (52.52); 2025 World Championships; August 3, 2025 / Singapore, Singapore	3:50.43; USA; Katharine Berkoff (58.35); McKenzie Siroky (1:05.07); Gretchen Walsh (54.78); Kate Douglass (52.23); 2026 Pan Pacific Championships; August 15, 2026 / Irvine, California

Legend: + – World record; * – Record awaiting ratification by USA Swimming;
Records not set in finals: p – preliminary; sf – semifinal; r – relay 1st leg; rh – relay heat 1st leg; b – B final; † – en route to final mark; tt – time trial;

== Short course meters (25 m) ==
=== Men ===
Event	American Record (25 m)	U.S. Open Record (25 m)
freestyle
50 free	20.16; Caeleb Dressel (Cali Condors); 2020 International Swimming League; November 21, 2020 / Budapest, Hungary	20.24; Caeleb Dressel (Cali Condors); 2019 International Swimming League; December 20, 2019 / Las Vegas, Nevada
100 free	44.64^{+} Jack Alexy (California Aquatics); World Championship Trials; October 30, 2026 / Westmont, Illinois	same
200 free	1:38.61^{+} Luke Hobson (USA); 2024 World Championships; December 15, 2024 / Budapest, Hungary	1:39.93; Luke Hobson (New York Athletic Club); World Championship Trials; October 31, 2026 / Westmont, Illinois
400 free	3:34.38; Kieran Smith (USA); 2022 World Championships; December 15, 2022 / Melbourne, Australia	3:35.99; Kieran Smith (USA); 2022 World Cup; November 3, 2022 / Indianapolis, United States
800 free	7:30.41; David Johnston (USA); 2022 Australian Championships; August 24, 2022 / Sydney, Australia	7:29.50; Zalán Sárkány (Hungary); 2025 World Cup; October 18, 2025 / Westmont, Illinois
1500 free	14:19.29; Connor Jaeger (USA); 2015 Duel in the Pool; December 12, 2015 / Indianapolis, United States	same
backstroke	American Record (25 m)	U.S. Open Record (25 m)
50 back	22.53; Ryan Murphy (LA Current); 2021 International Swimming League; November 25, 2021 / Eindhoven, Netherlands	22.65; Hubert Kós (Hungary); 2025 World Cup; October 11, 2025 / Carmel, Indiana
100 back	48.33; Coleman Stewart (Cali Condors); 2021 International Swimming League; August 29, 2021 / Naples, Italy	48.78; Hubert Kós (Hungary); 2025 World Cup; October 19, 2025 / Westmont, Illinois
200 back	1:46.68; Ryan Lochte (USA); 2010 World Championships; December 19, 2010 / Dubai, UAE	1:46.84; Hubert Kós (Hungary); 2025 World Cup; October 10, 2025 / Carmel, Indiana
breaststroke	American Record (25 m)	U.S. Open Record (25 m)
50 breast	25.21; Van Mathias (Indiana); World Championship Trials; October 30, 2026 / Westmont, Illinois	same
100 breast	55.14^{+} Van Mathias (Indiana); World Championship Trials; October 29, 2026 / Westmont, Illinois	same
200 breast	2:01.60; Nic Fink (USA); 2022 World Championships; December 16, 2022 / Melbourne, Australia	2:01.63; Caspar Corbeau (Netherlands); 2025 World Cup; October 12, 2025 / Carmel, Indiana
butterfly	American Record (25 m)	U.S. Open Record (25 m)
50 fly	21.46; Ilya Kharun (Unattached)^{[A]} World Championship Trials; October 31, 2026 / Westmont, Illinois	same
100 fly	47.78; Caeleb Dressel (Cali Condors); 2020 International Swimming League; November 21, 2020 / Budapest, Hungary	48.45; Ilya Kharun (Unattached)^{[A]} World Championship Trials; October 29, 2026 / Westmont, Illinois
200 fly	1:47.65; Luca Urlando (DART); World Championship Trials; October 30, 2026 / Westmont, Illinois	same
individual medley	American Record (25 m)	U.S. Open Record (25 m)
100 IM	49.28^{+} Caeleb Dressel (Cali Condors); 2020 International Swimming League; November 22, 2020 / Budapest, Hungary	50.34; Caeleb Dressel (Sporting Jax); World Championship Trials; October 29, 2026 / Westmont, Illinois
200 IM	1:49.43; Shaine Casas (USA); 2025 World Cup; October 11, 2025 / Carmel, Indiana	same
400 IM	3:55.50; Ryan Lochte (USA); 2010 World Championships; December 16, 2010 / Dubai, UAE	3:54.81^{+} (Japan) Daiya Seto (Energy Standard); 2019 International Swimming League; December 20, 2019 / Las Vegas, Nevada
relays	American Record (25 m)	U.S. Open Record (25 m)
200 free relay	1:21.80; USA; Caeleb Dressel (20.43); Ryan Held (20.25); Jack Conger (20.59); Michael Chadwick (20.53); 2018 World Championships; December 14, 2018 / Hangzhou, China	1:23.75; Auburn Tigers (Trinidad and Tobago) George Bovell (21.40); Ryan Wochomurka (21.04); Derek Gibb (20.76) (France) Frédérick Bousquet (20.55); 2004 Men's NCAA Division I Championships; March 25, 2004 / East Meadow, New York
400 free relay	3:01.66^{+} USA; Jack Alexy (45.05); Luke Hobson (45.18); Kieran Smith (46.01); Chris Guiliano (45.42); 2024 World Championships; December 10, 2024 / Budapest, Hungary	3:05.11; London Roar (Australia) Cameron McEvoy (47.49) (Australia) Kyle Chalmers (45.55) (Canada) Yuri Kisil (46.68) (United Kingdom) Duncan Scott (45.39); 2019 International Swimming League; December 20, 2019 / Las Vegas, Nevada
800 free relay	6:40.51^{+} USA; Luke Hobson (1:38.91); Carson Foster (1:40.77); Shaine Casas (1:40.34); Kieran Smith (1:40.49); 2024 World Championships; December 13, 2024 / Budapest, Hungary	7:01.42; Michigan Wolverines; Peter Vanderkaay (1:45.69); Davis Tarwater (1:45.61) (Canada) Andrew Hurd (1:44.96); Dan Ketchum (1:45.16); 2004 Men's NCAA Division I Championships; March 26, 2004 / East Meadow, New York
200 medley relay	1:30.37; USA; Ryan Murphy (22.61); Nic Fink (25.24); Shaine Casas (22.13); Michael Andrew (20.39); 2022 World Championships; December 17, 2022 / Melbourne, Australia	1:31.31; Florida Gators (United Kingdom) Jonathon Marshall (23.34); Julian Smith (25.63) (Canada) Joshua Liendo (21.43) (Canada) Ed Fullum-Huot (20.91); Virginia vs. Florida Dual Meet; October 18, 2024 / Charlottesville, Virginia
400 medley relay	3:18.98; USA; Ryan Murphy (48.96); Nic Fink (54.88); Trenton Julian (49.19); Kieran Smith (45.95); 2022 World Championships; December 18, 2022 / Melbourne, Australia	3:20.91; USA; Matt Grevers (49.25); Kevin Cordes (58.03); Tom Shields (48.07); Nathan Adrian (45.56); 2015 Duel in the Pool; December 12, 2015 / Indianapolis, Indiana

Legend: + – World record; * – Record awaiting ratification by USA Swimming;
Records not set in finals: p – preliminary; sf – semifinal; r – relay 1st leg; rh – relay heat 1st leg; b – B final; † – en route to final mark; tt – time trial;

=== Women ===
Event	American Record (25 m)	U.S. Open Record (25 m)
freestyle
50 free	22.75^{+} Gretchen Walsh (New York Athletic Club); UVA Pro Elite SCM Worlds Prep Meet; October 16, 2026 / Charlottesville, Virginia 22.75^{+} Kate Douglass (New York Athletic Club); World Championship Trials; October 29, 2026 / Westmont, Illinois	same
100 free	49.64^{+} Kate Douglass (New York Athletic Club); World Championship Trials; October 31, 2026 / Westmont, Illinois	same
200 free	1:51.31; Liberty Clark (Indiana); World Championship Trials; October 30, 2026 / Westmont, Illinois	1:49.77; Mollie O'Callaghan (Australia); 2025 World Cup; October 18, 2025 / Westmont, Illinois
400 free	3:52.88; Katie Ledecky (USA); 2022 World Cup; October 28, 2022 / Toronto, Canada	3:52.42; Lani Pallister (Australia); 2025 World Cup; October 17, 2025 / Westmont, Illinois
800 free	7:57.42; Katie Ledecky (USA); 2022 World Cup; November 5, 2022 / Indianapolis, Indiana	same
1500 free	15:08.24^{+} Katie Ledecky (USA); 2022 World Cup; October 29, 2022 / Toronto, Canada	15:13.83; Lani Pallister (Australia); 2025 World Cup; October 19, 2025 / Westmont, Illinois
backstroke	American Record (25 m)	U.S. Open Record (25 m)
50 back	25.21^{+} Katharine Berkoff (Wolfpack Elite); World Championship Trials; October 29, 2026 / Westmont, Illinois	same
100 back	53.92^{+} Claire Curzan (University of Virginia); World Championship Trials; October 30, 2026 / Westmont, Illinois	same
200 back	1:57.65; Claire Curzan (University of Virginia); World Championship Trials; October 31, 2026 / Westmont, Illinois	same
breaststroke	American Record (25 m)	U.S. Open Record (25 m)
50 breast	28.77; Lilly King (Cali Condors); 2020 International Swimming League; November 21, 2020 / Budapest, Hungary	28.70; Rūta Meilutytė (Lithuania); 2022 World Cup; November 5, 2022 / Indianapolis, Indiana
100 breast	1:02.50; Lilly King (Cali Condors); 2020 International Swimming League; November 22, 2020 / Budapest, Hungary	1:02.77; Rūta Meilutytė (Lithuania); 2022 World Cup; November 4, 2022 / Indianapolis, Indiana
200 breast	2:12.50^{+} Kate Douglass (USA); 2024 World Championships; December 13, 2024 / Budapest, Hungary	2:13.97; Kate Douglass (USA); 2025 World Cup; October 10, 2025 / Carmel, Indiana
butterfly	American Record (25 m)	U.S. Open Record (25 m)
50 fly	23.72^{+} Gretchen Walsh (USA); 2025 World Cup; October 11, 2025 / Carmel, Indiana	same
100 fly	52.71^{+} Gretchen Walsh (USA); 2024 World Championships; December 14, 2024 / Budapest, Hungary	53.69; Gretchen Walsh (USA); 2025 World Cup; October 12, 2025 / Carmel, Indiana
200 fly	2:00.20; Regan Smith (USA); 2025 World Cup; October 17, 2025 / Westmont, Illinois	same
individual medley	American Record (25 m)	U.S. Open Record (25 m)
100 IM	55.11^{+} Gretchen Walsh (USA); 2024 World Championships; December 13, 2024 / Budapest, Hungary	55.77; Gretchen Walsh (USA); 2025 World Cup; October 17, 2025 / Westmont, Illinois
200 IM	2:01.63^{+} Kate Douglass (USA); 2024 World Championships; December 10, 2024 / Budapest, Hungary	2:01.66; Kate Douglass (New York Athletic Club); World Championship Trials; October 30, 2026 / Westmont, Illinois
400 IM	4:20.14; Katie Grimes (USA); 2024 World Championships; December 14, 2024 / Budapest, Hungary	4:21.21 (Hungary) Katinka Hosszú (Europe All-Stars); 2015 Duel in the Pool; December 11, 2015 / Indianapolis, Indiana
relays	American Record (25 m)	U.S. Open Record (25 m)
200 free relay	1:33.89; USA; Torri Huske (24.08); Claire Curzan (23.30); Erika Brown (23.74); Kate Douglass (22.77); 2022 World Championships; December 15, 2022 / Melbourne, Australia	1:37.27; Georgia Bulldogs; Kara Lynn Joyce (24.24); Neka Mabry (24.45); Paige Kearns (24.34); Andrea Georoff (24.24); 2004 NCAA Division I Championships; March 18, 2004 / College Station, Texas
400 free relay	3:25.01^{+} USA; Kate Douglass (50.95); Katharine Berkoff (51.38); Alex Shackell (52.01); Gretchen Walsh (50.67); 2024 World Championships; December 13, 2022 / Budapest, Hungary	3:26.48; Energy Standard (Canada) Penny Oleksiak (52.89) (Sweden) Sarah Sjöström (51.41) (Canada) Kayla Sanchez (51.56) (Netherlands) Femke Heemskerk (50.62); 2019 International Swimming League; December 20, 2019 / Las Vegas, Nevada
800 free relay	7:30.13^{+} USA; Alex Walsh (1:53.25); Paige Madden (1:53.18); Katie Grimes (1:53.39); Claire Weinstein (1:50.31); 2024 World Championships; December 12, 2024 / Budapest, Hungary	7:47.72; USA; Dana Vollmer (1:57.83); Rachel Komisarz (1:57.87); Lindsay Benko (1:55.44); Kaitlin Sandeno (1:56.58); 2004 World Championships; October 7, 2004 / Indianapolis, Indiana
200 medley relay	1:42.38; USA; Olivia Smoliga (25.97); Katie Meili (29.29); Kelsi Dahlia (24.02); Mallory Comerford (23.10); 2018 World Championships; December 12, 2018 / Hangzhou, China	1:44.14; Virginia Cavaliers; Gretchen Walsh (25.37); Zoe Skirboll (30.00); Claire Curzan (24.52); Maxine Parker (24.25); Virginia vs. Florida Dual Meet; October 18, 2024 / Charlottesville, Virginia
400 medley relay	3:40.41^{+} USA; Regan Smith (54.02); Lilly King (1:03.02); Gretchen Walsh (52.84); Kate Douglass (50.53); 2024 World Championships; December 15, 2024 / Budapest, Hungary	3:45.20; USA; Courtney Bartholomew (56.08); Katie Meili (1:02.88); Kelsi Worrell (55.01); Simone Manuel (51.23); 2015 Duel in the Pool; December 11, 2015 / Indianapolis, Indiana

Legend: + – World record; * – Record awaiting ratification by USA Swimming;
Records not set in finals: p – preliminary; sf – semifinal; r – relay 1st leg; rh – relay heat 1st leg; b – B final; † – en route to final mark; tt – time trial;

== Short course yards (25 yd) ==
=== Men ===
Event	American Record (25 yd)	U.S. Open Record (25 yd)
freestyle
50 free	17.63; Caeleb Dressel (Florida Gators); 2018 NCAA Division I Championships; March 22, 2018 / Minneapolis, Minnesota	same
100 free	39.90; Caeleb Dressel (Florida Gators); 2018 NCAA Division I Championships; March 24, 2018 / Minneapolis, Minnesota	39.83 (Cayman Islands) Jordan Crooks (Tennessee Volunteers); 2025 NCAA Division I Championships (p); March 29, 2025 / Federal Way, Washington
200 free	1:28.33; Luke Hobson (Texas Longhorns); 2025 NCAA Division I Championships; March 29, 2025 / Federal Way, Washington	same
500 free	4:04.45; Rex Maurer (Texas Longhorns); 2024 Texas Hall of Fame Invite; November 20, 2024 / Austin, Texas	4:02.31 (France) Léon Marchand (Arizona State Sun Devils); 2024 NCAA Division I Championships; March 28, 2024 / Indianapolis, Indiana
1000 free	8:32.83; Luka Mijatovic (Pleasanton Seahawks); 2026 Speedo Sectionals; March 1, 2026 / Roseville, California	same
1650 free	14:12.08; Bobby Finke (Florida Gators); 2020 SEC Championships; February 22, 2020 / Auburn, Alabama	14:10.03 (Tunisia) Ahmed Jaouadi (Florida Gators); 2026 NCAA Division I Championships; March 25, 2026 / Atlanta, Georgia
backstroke	American Record (25 yd)	U.S. Open Record (25 yd)
100 back	43.26; Will Modglin (Texas Longhorns); 2025 Texas Hall of Fame Invite (p); November 20, 2025 / Austin, Texas	42.61 (Hungary) Hubert Kós (Texas Longhorns); 2026 NCAA Division I Championships; March 27, 2026 / Atlanta, Georgia
200 back	1:35.37; Destin Lasco (California Golden Bears); 2024 NCAA Division I Championships; March 30, 2024 / Indianapolis, Indiana	1:34.13 (Hungary) Hubert Kós (Texas Longhorns); 2026 NCAA Division I Championships; March 28, 2026 / Atlanta, Georgia
breaststroke	American Record (25 yd)	U.S. Open Record (25 yd)
100 breast	49.51; Julian Smith (Florida Gators); 2025 SEC Championships; February 21, 2025 / Athens, Georgia	same
200 breast	1:47.91; Will Licon (Texas Longhorns); 2017 NCAA Division I Championships; March 25, 2017 / Indianapolis, Indiana	1:46.35 (France) Léon Marchand (Arizona State Sun Devils); 2024 NCAA Division I Championships; March 30, 2024 / Indianapolis, Indiana
butterfly	American Record (25 yd)	U.S. Open Record (25 yd)
100 fly	42.80; Caeleb Dressel (Florida Gators); 2018 NCAA Division I Championships; March 23, 2018 / Minneapolis, Minnesota	42.49 (Canada) Joshua Liendo (Florida Gators); 2026 NCAA Division I Championships; March 26, 2026 / Atlanta, Georgia
200 fly	1:36.41; Luca Urlando (Georgia Bulldogs); 2025 Georgia Fall Invitational; November 21, 2025 / Athens, Georgia	same
individual medley	American Record (25 yd)	U.S. Open Record (25 yd)
200 IM	1:37.91; Destin Lasco (California Golden Bears); 2024 NCAA Division I Championships; March 28, 2024 / Indianapolis, Indiana	1:36.34 (France) Léon Marchand (Arizona State Sun Devils); 2023 NCAA Division I Championships; March 23, 2023 / Minneapolis, Minnesota
400 IM	3:32.96; Rex Maurer (Texas Longhorns); 2026 NCAA Division I Championships; March 26, 2026 / Atlanta, Georgia	3:28.82 (France) Léon Marchand (Arizona State Sun Devils); 2023 NCAA Division I Championships; March 24, 2023 / Minneapolis, Minnesota
relays	American Record (25 yd)	U.S. Open Record (25 yd)
200 free relay	1:14.13; NC State Wolfpack; Noah Henderson (18.93); Luke Miller (18.23); Jerry Fox (18.44); Quintin McCarty (18.53); 2024 NCAA Division I Championships; March 28, 2024 / Indianapolis, Indiana	1:12.46; Arizona State Sun Devils (Luxembourg) Remi Fabiani (18.59); Adam Chaney (18.12) (Canada) Ilya Kharun (17.76)^{[A]} Jonny Kulow (17.99); 2026 NCAA Division I Championships; March 26, 2026 / Atlanta, Georgia
400 free relay	2:44.31; NC State Wolfpack; Ryan Held (41.05); Justin Ress (40.62); Jacob Molacek (41.02); Coleman Stewart (41.62); 2018 NCAA Division I Championships; March 24, 2018 / Minneapolis, Minnesota	2:42.15; Arizona State Sun Devils (Canada) Ilya Kharun (40.86)^{[A]} Adam Chaney (41.21) (Luxembourg) Remi Fabiani (40.00); Jonny Kulow (40.08); 2026 Big 12 Championships; February 28, 2026 / Greensboro, North Carolina
800 free relay	6:00.08; Texas Longhorns; Luke Hobson (1:28.90); Chris Guiliano (1:30.13); Rex Maurer (1:29.91); Coby Carrozza (1:31.14); 2025 NCAA Division I Championships; March 26, 2025 / Federal Way, Washington	5:59.75; California Golden Bears; Jack Alexy (1:30.02); Gabriel Jett (1:29.16); Destin Lasco (1:29.10) (Belgium) Lucas Henveaux (1:31.47); 2025 NCAA Division I Championships; March 26, 2025 / Federal Way, Washington
200 medley relay	1:20.92; Indiana Hoosiers; Luke Barr (20.65); Brian Benzing (22.65); Finn Brooks (19.49); Matt King (18.13); 2025 NCAA Division I Championships; March 26, 2025 / Federal Way, Washington	1:20.03; Florida Gators (United Kingdom) Jonathon Marshall (20.52) (Netherlands) Koen de Groot (22.61); Scotty Buff (19.32) (Canada) Joshua Liendo (17.58); 2026 SEC Championships; February 17, 2026 / Knoxville, Tennessee
400 medley relay	3:00.34; Texas Longhorns; Will Modglin (43.78); Nate Germonprez (49.91); Garrett Gould (45.31); Camden Taylor (41.34); 2025 Texas Hall of Fame Invite; November 20, 2025 / Austin, Texas	2:55.66; Florida Gators (United Kingdom) Jonathon Marshall (43.91); Julian Smith (48.95) (Canada) Joshua Liendo (42.12) (United Kingdom) Alex Painter (40.68); 2025 SEC Championships; February 21, 2025 / Athens, Georgia

Legend: * – Record awaiting ratification by USA Swimming;
Records not set in finals: p – preliminary; sf – semifinal; r – relay 1st leg; rh – relay heat 1st leg; b – B final; † – en route to final mark; tt – time trial;

=== Women ===
Event	American Record (25 yd)	U.S. Open Record (25 yd)
freestyle
50 free	20.37; Gretchen Walsh (Virginia Cavaliers); 2024 NCAA Division I Championships; March 21, 2024 / Athens, Georgia 20.37; Gretchen Walsh (Virginia Cavaliers); 2025 NCAA Division I Championships (r); March 20, 2025 / Federal Way, Washington	same
100 free	44.71; Gretchen Walsh (Virginia Cavaliers); 2025 NCAA Division I Championships; March 22, 2025 / Federal Way, Washington	same
200 free	1:39.10; Missy Franklin (California Golden Bears); 2015 NCAA Division I Championships; March 20, 2015 / Greensboro, North Carolina	same
500 free	4:24.06; Katie Ledecky (Stanford Cardinal); 2017 NCAA Division I Championships; March 16, 2017 / Indianapolis, Indiana	same
1000 free	8:59.65; Katie Ledecky (Nation's Capital); 2015 Nation's Capital Swim Club Invite; December 13, 2015 / College Park, Maryland	same
1650 free	14:59.62; Katie Ledecky (Gator Swim Club); 2025 Katie Ledecky Invitational; December 14, 2025 / College Park, Maryland	same
backstroke	American Record (25 yd)	U.S. Open Record (25 yd)
100 back	48.10; Gretchen Walsh (Virginia Cavaliers); 2024 ACC Championships; February 23, 2024 / Greensboro, North Carolina	same
200 back	1:46.09; Claire Curzan (Virginia Cavaliers); 2026 ACC Championships; 21 February, 2026 / Atlanta, Georgia	same
breaststroke	American Record (25 yd)	U.S. Open Record (25 yd)
100 breast	55.73; Lilly King (Indiana Hoosiers); 2019 NCAA Division I Championships; March 22, 2019 / Austin, Texas	same
200 breast	2:01.29; Kate Douglass (Virginia Cavaliers); 2023 NCAA Division I Championships; March 18, 2023 / Knoxville, Tennessee	same
butterfly	American Record (25 yd)	U.S. Open Record (25 yd)
100 fly	46.97; Gretchen Walsh (Virginia Cavaliers); 2025 NCAA Division I Championships; March 21, 2025 / Federal Way, Washington	same
200 fly	1:48.33; Regan Smith (Arizona State Sun Devils); Arizona State vs. NC State Dual Meet; October 21, 2023 / Tempe, Arizona	same
individual medley	American Record (25 yd)	U.S. Open Record (25 yd)
200 IM	1:48.37; Kate Douglass (Virginia Cavaliers); 2023 NCAA Division I Championships; March 16, 2023 / Knoxville, Tennessee	same
400 IM	3:54.60; Ella Eastin (Stanford Cardinal); 2018 NCAA Division I Championships; March 16, 2018 / Columbus, Ohio	same
relays	American Record (25 yd)	U.S. Open Record (25 yd)
200 free relay	1:23.87; Virginia Cavaliers; Kate Douglass (20.95); Gretchen Walsh (20.48); Lexi Cuomo (21.14); Alex Walsh (21.30); 2023 ACC Championships; February 15, 2023 / Greensboro, North Carolina	1:23.63; Virginia Cavaliers (Italy) Jasmine Nocentini (21.55); Gretchen Walsh (19.95); Alex Walsh (20.82); Maxine Parker (21.31); 2024 ACC Championships; February 21, 2024 / Greensboro, North Carolina
400 free relay	3:05.84; Virginia Cavaliers; Kate Douglass (46.37); Alex Walsh (46.58); Maxine Parker (47.04); Gretchen Walsh (45.85); 2023 NCAA Division I Championships; March 18, 2023 / Knoxville, Tennessee	3:05.26; Virginia Cavaliers; Claire Curzan (46.62); Madi Mintenko (46.73); Anna Moesch (45.61) (Italy) Sara Curtis (46.30); 2026 NCAA Division I Championships; 21 March, 2026 / Atlanta, Georgia
800 free relay	6:45.91; Stanford Cardinal; Simone Manuel (1:41.41); Lia Neal (1:42.15); Ella Eastin (1:41.89); Katie Ledecky (1:40.46); 2017 NCAA Division I Championships; March 15, 2017 / Indianapolis, Indiana	6:44.13; Virginia Cavaliers; Gretchen Walsh (1:39.34); Alex Walsh (1:41.87) (South Africa) Aimee Canny (1:42.03); Claire Curzan (1:40.89); 2025 ACC Championships; February 18, 2025 / Greensboro, North Carolina
200 medley relay	1:31.10; Virginia Cavaliers; Claire Curzan (23.17); Alex Walsh (25.62); Gretchen Walsh (20.88); Maxine Parker (21.43); 2025 NCAA Division I Championships; 19 March 2025 / Federal Way, Washington	same
400 medley relay	3:19.58; Virginia Cavaliers; Claire Curzan (49.35); Alex Walsh (57.05); Gretchen Walsh (47.00); Anna Moesch (46.18); 2025 ACC Championships; February 21, 2025 / Greensboro, North Carolina	same

Legend: * – Record awaiting ratification by USA Swimming;
Records not set in finals: p – preliminary; sf – semifinal; r – relay 1st leg; rh – relay heat 1st leg; b – B final; † – en route to final mark; tt – time trial;

== Notes ==
1. Ilya Kharun initially represented Canada, before switching his sporting citizenship to the US in October 2026.
