= 2026 NCAA Division I Men's Swimming and Diving Championships =

American collegiate aquatics competition

- Host city: Atlanta, Georgia
- Date: March 25–28, 2026
- Venue(s): McAuley Aquatic Center; Georgia Tech

The 2026 NCAA Division I Men's Swimming and Diving Championships was contested on March 25–28, 2026 as it was the 102nd annual NCAA-sanctioned swim meet to determine the team and individual national champions of Division I men's collegiate swimming and diving in the United States.

This year's events were being hosted by Georgia Tech at the McAuley Aquatic Center in Atlanta, Georgia.

The championship qualifiers were announced on March 11, 2026, on the NCAA website. A total of 270 participants (235 swimmers and 35 divers) will compete in the championships. ESPN+ will provide live digital coverage for preliminary and finals sessions.

Texas won its second consecutive championship with a score of 445.50.

== Team standings ==
- Note: Top 10 only
- (H) = Hosts
- ^{(DC)} = Defending champions

Rank	Team	Points
1st place, gold medalist(s)	Texas ^{(DC)}	445.50
2nd place, silver medalist(s)	Florida	416
3rd place, bronze medalist(s)	Indiana	351
4	Arizona State	328
5	Tennessee	272
6	NC State	258.50
7	California	231
8	Michigan	220
9	Virginia	192
10	Stanford	136

== Swimming Results ==
Full Results

Event	Gold		Silver		Bronze	
50 freestyle	Josh Liendo; Florida	18.06	Guilherme Caribé; Tennessee	18.19	Ilya Kharun; Arizona State	18.24
100 freestyle	Josh Liendo; Florida	39.91	Jere Hribar; LSU	40.33	Guilherme Caribé; Tennessee	40.41
200 freestyle	Maximus Williamson; Virginia	1:30.03	Koby Bujak-Upton; Tennessee	1:30.11	Henry McFadden; Stanford	1:30.13
500 freestyle	Ahmed Hafnaoui; Florida	4:06.56	Ahmed Jaouadi; Florida	4:06.90	Rex Maurer; Texas	4:07.88
1650 freestyle	Ahmed Jaouadi; Florida	14:10.03; US	Zalan Sarkany; Indiana	14:12.20	Levi Sandidge; Kentucky	14:22.26
100 backstroke	Hubert Kós; Texas	42.61; US	Ruard Van Renen; Georgia	43.54	Adam Chaney; Arizona State	43.75
200 backstroke	Hubert Kós; Texas	1:34.13; US	Jonny Marshall; Florida	1:37.15	David King; Virginia	1:37.43
100 breaststroke	Yamato Okadome; California	49.90	Campbell McKean; Texas	50.25	Nate Germonprez; Texas	50.38
200 breaststroke	Yamato Okadome; California	1:48.61	Josh Bey; Indiana	1:48.79	Luka Mladenovic; Michigan	1:49.34
100 butterfly	Josh Liendo; Florida	42.49; US	Hubert Kós; Texas	42.54	Ilya Kharun; Arizona State	42.92
200 butterfly	Ilya Kharun; Arizona State	1:37.66	Thomas Heilman; Virginia	1:38.16	Tyler Ray; Michigan	1:38.47
200 IM	Maximus Williamson; Virginia	1:38.48	Owen McDonald; Indiana	1:38.57	Baylor Nelson; Texas	1:40.08
400 IM	Rex Maurer; Texas	3:32.96; AR	Baylor Nelson; Texas	3:35.28	Tristan Jankovics; Ohio State	3:35.40
200 freestyle relay	Arizona State; Remi Fabiani (18.59); Adam Chaney (18.12); Ilya Kharun (17.76); Jonny Kulow (17.99)	1:12.46; US	Florida; Josh Liendo (18.27); Alexander Painter (18.12); Scotty Buff (18.54); Devin Dilger (18.37)	1:13.30	NC State; Quintin McCarty (18.54); Drew Salls (18.32); Jerry Fox (18.39); Kaii Winkler (18.48)	1:13.73
400 freestyle relay	Arizona State; Ilya Kharun (41.17); Adam Chaney (40.85); Remi Fabiani (40.29); Jonny Kulow (40.07)	2:42.38	NC State; Jerry Fox (41.70); Quintin McCarty (40.55); Hudson Williams (40.91); Kaii Winkler (40.15)	2:43.31	Florida; Devin Dilger (41.86); Alexander Painter (41.00); Scotty Buff (41.14); Josh Liendo (40.38)	2:44.38
800 freestyle relay	Texas; Rafael Fente-Damers (1:32.72); Camden Taylor (1:31.14); Rex Maurer (1:30.76); Baylor Nelson (1:31.20)	6:05.82	Stanford; Andres Dupont Cabrera (1:32.59); Ethan Ekk (1:31.49); Jason Zhao (1:32.59); Henry McFadden (1:29.72)	6:06.39	Ohio State; Tomas Navikonis (1:31.36); Cornelius Jahn (1:31.14); Jordi Vilchez (1:32.15); Tristan Jankovics (1:31.75)	6:06.40
200 medley relay	Arizona State; Adam Chaney (20.35); Andy Dobrzanski (23.04); Ilya Kharun (18.70); Jonny Kulow (17.98)	1:20.07; MR	Florida; Jonny Marshall (20.76); Koen de Groot (22.76); Scotty Buff (19.06); Josh Liendo (17.58)	1:20.16	Texas; Will Modglin (20.36); Nate Germonprez (22.73); Hubert Kós (19.77); Mikkel Lee (18.26)	1:20.46
400 medley relay	Arizona State; Adam Chaney (43.64); Andy Dobrzanski (50.28); Ilya Kharun (42.63); Remi Fabiani (40.24)	2:56.79	Texas; Will Modglin (43.49); Nate Germonprez (49.77); Hubert Kos (42.52); Camden Taylor (41.44)	2:57.22	Florida; Jonny Marshall (44.09); Koen de Groot (50.05); Josh Liendo (42.41); Alexander Painter (40.99)	2:57.54

Legend: US – U.S. Open record; MR – Meet record; AR – American record;

== Diving results ==
Event	Gold		Silver		Bronze	
1 m diving	Luke Sitz; Southern Methodist	428.10	Matteo Santoro; Miami (FL)	412.50	Bennett Greene; Tennessee	400.90
3 m diving	Collier Dyer; Missouri	497.75	Luke Sitz; Southern Methodist	495.30	Moritz Wesemann; USC	485.85
Platform diving	Emilio Trevino; Texas A&M	465.30	Tyler Wills; Purdue	451.15	Jesus Gonzalez; Florida	427.25

== See also ==
- List of college swimming and diving teams
- 2026 NCAA Division I Women's Swimming and Diving Championships
