= 2024 World Aquatics Swimming Championships (25 m) – Mixed 4 × 100 metre medley relay =

Swimming competition

Mixed 4 × 100 metre medley relay at the 2024 World Aquatics Swimming Championships (25 m)
- Venue: Duna Arena
- Location: Budapest, Hungary
- Dates: 14 December (heats and final)
- Competitors: 147 from 34 nations
- Teams: 34
- Winning time: 3:30.47

Medalists
gold medal	Miron Lifintsev; Kirill Prigoda; Arina Surkova; Daria Klepikova; Pavel Samusenko; Alexander Zhigalov; Daria Trofimova
silver medal	Regan Smith; Lilly King; Dare Rose; Jack Alexy; Shaine Casas; AJ Pouch; Alex Shackell; Alex Walsh	United States
bronze medal	Ingrid Wilm; Finlay Knox; Ilya Kharun; Mary-Sophie Harvey; Blake Tierney; Sophie Angus; Penny Oleksiak	Canada

The mixed 4 × 100 metre medley relay event at the 2024 World Aquatics Swimming Championships (25 m) was held on 14 December 2024 at the Duna Arena in Budapest, Hungary.

== Background ==
It was the first time this event was held at the Championships. The Neutral Athletes B team (consisting entirely of Russian athletes) opened with Miron Lifincev and Kirill Prigoda on back and breast, with Arina Surkova and Daria Klepikova closing the relay. The USA's team featured Regan Smith, Lilly King, Dare Rose, and Jack Alexy. Other medal contenders included Canada, Italy, Australia, and China.

SwimSwam wrote that predicting the winners of the mixed relays was "nigh impossible" due to the amount of variables. They predicted Australia would win, the USA would come second, and the Neutral Athletes B team would come third.

== Results ==
=== Heats ===
The heats were started at 11:53.

Rank	Heat	Lane	Nation	Swimmers	Time	Notes
1	5	4	United States	Shaine Casas (50.04); AJ Pouch (56.76); Alex Shackell (55.70); Alex Walsh (51.80)	3:34.30	Q
2	5	5	Australia	Iona Anderson (56.29); Joshua Yong (56.46); Matthew Temple (48.84); Milla Jansen (52.72)	3:34.31	Q
3	5	3	Netherlands	Maaike de Waard (56.66); Caspar Corbeau (56.69); Nyls Korstanje (49.75); Milou van Wijk (52.20)	3:35.30	Q
4	4	5	Canada	Blake Tierney (50.48); Sophie Angus (1:03.89); Finlay Knox (49.96); Penny Oleksiak (51.97)	3:36.30	Q
5	4	3	Great Britain	Oliver Morgan (50.83); Angharad Evans (1:03.64); Joshua Gammon (50.16); Eva Okaro (51.76)	3:36.39	Q
6	1	4	Neutral Athletes B	Pavel Samusenko (50.30); Aleksandr Zhigalov (56.84); Arina Surkova (56.95); Daria Trofimova (52.31)	3:36.40	Q
7	5	1	Spain	Carmen Weiler (56.89); Carles Coll (57.21); Mario Mollá (49.36); María Daza (53.32)	3:36.78	Q, NR
8	4	6	Italy	Lorenzo Mora (50.67); Ludovico Viberti (57.51); Elena Capretta (57.06); Sofia Morini (52.02)	3:37.26	Q, NR
9	5	6	Japan	Masaki Yura (51.23); Taku Taniguchi (56.44); Mizuki Hirai (56.07); Yume Jinno (53.62)	3:37.36	
10	5	7	South Africa	Ruard van Renen (50.07); Rebecca Meder (1:04.81); Chad le Clos (49.57); Caitlin de Lange (53.26)	3:37.71	
11	4	2	Poland	Kacper Stokowski (49.78); Dominika Sztandera (1:04.38); Jakub Majerski (50.08); Kornelia Fiedkiewicz (53.52)	3:37.76	NR
12	5	2	Sweden	Samuel Törnqvist (51.05); Daniel Kertes (57.95); Sara Junevik (56.48); Sofia Åstedt (52.67)	3:38.15	NR
13	4	4	China	Wang Gukailai (50.91); Yu Zongda (58.22); Chen Luying (56.88); Luo Mingyu (53.09)	3:39.10	NR
14	4	7	Hungary	Ádám Jászó (51.84); Henrietta Fángli (1:05.41); Panna Ugrai (57.09); Boldizsár Magda (47.24)	3:41.58	NR
15	4	8	Hong Kong	Hayden Kwan (52.14); Adam Mak (58.38); Yeung Hoi Ching (58.16); Li Sum Yiu (53.69)	3:42.37	NR
16	5	8	Kazakhstan	Xeniya Ignatova (59.34); Arsen Kozhakhmetov (58.00); Adilbek Mussin (50.15); Sofia Spodarenko (55.32)	3:42.81	
17	3	5	Slovakia	Martin Perečinský (52.71); Andrea Podmaníková (1:06.78); Tamara Potocká (56.76); Jakub Poliačik (48.30)	3:44.55	NR
18	4	1	New Zealand	Cooper Morley (51.76); Brearna Crawford (1:07.70); Ben Littlejohn (52.14); Zoe Pedersen (53.40)	3:45.00	NR
19	1	6	Iceland	Guðmundur Leo Rafnsson (53.14); Einar Margeir Ágústsson (57.95); Jóhanna Elín Guðmundsdóttir (1:00.90); Snæfríður Jórunnardóttir (53.02)	3:45.01	NR
20	3	6	Peru	Alexia Sotomayor (1:00.74); Anthony Puertas (1:02.00); Diego Balbi (51.80); Rafaela Fernandini (55.41)	3:49.95	NR
21	3	7	Dominican Republic	Elizabeth Jiménez (1:01.19); Josué Domínguez (59.17); Javier Núñez (52.97); Darielys Ortiz (58.28)	3:51.61	NR
22	3	2	Namibia	Jessica Humphrey (1:01.56); Ronan Wantenaar (59.77); Oliver Durand (54.61); Molina Smalley (58.84)	3:54.78	NR
23	2	3	Kyrgyzstan	Elizaveta Pecherskikh (1:03.66); Denis Petrashov (57.38); Daniil Mistriukov (58.8); Aiymkyz Aidaralieva (59.18)	3:59.02	
24	2	6	Kenya	Imara Thorpe (1:03.55); Haniel Kudwoli (1:02.34); Stephen Nyoike (57.41); Sara Mose (56.24)	3:59.54	NR
25	2	8	Moldova	Natalia Zaiteva (1:04.01); Constantin Malachi (1:00.82); Anastasia Basisto (1:04.03); Chirill Chirsanov (52.29)	4:01.15	
26	2	1	Jordan	Adnan Al-Abdallat (59.44); Amro Al-Wir (59.91); Tara Al-Oul (1:05.65); Karin Belbeisi (1:00.75)	4:05.75	NR
27	1	2	Uganda	Kirabo Namutebi (1:07.61); Tendo Mukalazi (1:04.06); Tendo Kaumi (59.94); Gloria Anna Muzito (54.59)	4:06.20	NR
28	2	7	North Korea	Kim Sol-song (1:08.84); Kim Won-ju (1:05.15); Kim Ryong-hyon (56.41); Pak Mi-song (57.20)	4:07.60	
29	3	8	Madagascar	Idealy Tendrinavalona (1:05.05); Jonathan Raharvel (1:02.27); Baritiana Andriampenomanana (1:01.37); Antsa Rabejaona (59.00)	4:07.69	NR
30	1	7	Samoa	Kaiya Brown (1:09.92); Kokoro Frost (1:07.96); Paige Schendelaar-Kemp (1:01.91); Hector Langkilde (49.70)	4:09.49	
31	2	4	Northern Mariana Islands	Piper Raho (1:09.54); Kouki Cerezo Watanabe (1:05.67); Taiyo Akimaru (59.22); Maria Batallones (1:02.63)	4:17.06	
32	2	2	Maldives	Mohamed Rihan Shiham (1:03.27); Hamna Ahmed (1:24.36); Meral Ayn Latheef (1:12.29); Mohamed Aan Hussain (52.13)	4:32.05	
	1	3	Neutral Athletes A	Anastasiya Shkurdai (57.60); Ilya Shymanovich (57.69); Anastasiya Kuliashova (56.64); Grigori Pekarski	Disqualified	
	3	1	Guatemala	Melissa Diego (1:02.17); Nicole Mack; Erick Gordillo; Miguel Vásquez	Disqualified	
	3	3	Finland	Ronny Brännkärr; Davin Lindholm; Laura Lahtinen; Fanny Teijonsalo	Did not start	

=== Final ===
The final was held at 19:14.

Rank	Lane	Nation	Swimmers	Time	Notes
1st place, gold medalist(s)	7	Neutral Athletes B	Miron Lifintsev (48.90); Kirill Prigoda (54.86); Arina Surkova (55.63); Daria Klepikova (51.08)	3:30.47	
2nd place, silver medalist(s)	4	United States	Regan Smith (54.19); Lilly King (1:03.05); Dare Rose (48.68); Jack Alexy (44.63)	3:30.55	
3rd place, bronze medalist(s)	6	Canada	Ingrid Wilm (55.82); Finlay Knox (56.39); Ilya Kharun (48.27); Mary-Sophie Harvey (51.49)	3:31.97	
4	5	Australia	Iona Anderson (55.89); Joshua Yong (56.40); Matthew Temple (48.63); Milla Jansen (51.91)	3:32.83	
5	2	Great Britain	Oliver Morgan (50.53); Angharad Evans (1:03.44); Joshua Gammon (50.00); Eva Okaro (51.49)	3:35.46	
6	1	Spain	Carmen Weiler (56.97); Carles Coll (56.63); Mario Mollá (49.19); María Daza (52.73)	3:35.52	NR
7	8	Italy	Lorenzo Mora (50.11); Ludovico Viberti (57.08); Elena Capretta (56.77); Sara Curtis (51.58)	3:35.54	NR
8	3	Netherlands	Maaike de Waard (57.14); Caspar Corbeau (56.47); Nyls Korstanje (49.83); Milou van Wijk (52.60)	3:36.04	
