= 2025 NCAA Division I Women's Swimming and Diving Championships =

American college aquatic sports competition

- Host city: (Washington (state)) Federal Way, Washington
- Date: March 19–22, 2025
- Venue: Weyerhaeuser King County Aquatic Center

The 2025 NCAA Division I Women's Swimming and Diving Championships took place on March 19–22, 2025 at the 43rd annual NCAA-sanctioned swim meet to determine the team and individual national champions of Division I women's collegiate swimming and diving in the United States.

The meet is being hosted by Washington State University at Weyerhaeuser King County Aquatic Center in Federal Way, Washington

The University of Virginia won their fifth consecutive title becoming the third program ever to win five years in a row.

== Team standings ==
- Note: Top 10 only
- (H) = Hosts
- ^{(DC)} = Defending champions

Rank	Team	Points
1st place, gold medalist(s)	Virginia ^{(DC)}	544
2nd place, silver medalist(s)	Stanford	417
3rd place, bronze medalist(s)	Texas	394
4	Indiana	312
5	Tennessee	298
6	Florida	232
7	Louisville	209.5
8	California	202.5
9	Michigan	196
10	NC State	164

== Swimming results ==
Full results:

Event	Gold		Silver		Bronze	
50 freestyle	Gretchen Walsh; Virginia	20.49	Claire Curzan; Virginia	21.11	Julia Dennis; Louisville	21.20
100 freestyle	Gretchen Walsh; Virginia	44.71; US, AR	Torri Huske; Stanford	46.01	Camille Spink; Tennessee	46.68
200 freestyle	Anna Peplowski; Indiana	1:40.50	Minna Abraham; USC	1:40.56	Stephanie Balduccini; Michigan	1:40.89
500 freestyle	Jillian Cox; Texas	4:31.58	Aurora Roghair; Stanford	4:33.90	Anna Peplowski; Indiana	4:34.12
1650 freestyle	Jillian Cox; Texas	15:33.54	Aurora Roghair; Stanford	15:39.21	Gan Ching Hwee; Indiana	15:42.40
100 backstroke	Claire Curzan; Virginia	49.11	Bella Sims; Florida	49.12	Miranda Grana; Indiana	49.62
200 backstroke	Claire Curzan; Virginia	1:46.82; US, AR	Bella Sims; Florida	1:47.11	Phoebe Bacon; Wisconsin	1:47.60
100 breaststroke	Alex Walsh; Virginia	56.49	Mona McSharry; Tennessee	57.40	McKenzie Sirosky; Tennessee	57.41
200 breaststroke	Lucy Bell; Stanford	2:04.28	Mackenzie Miller; BYU	2:05.03	Brearna Crawford; Indiana	2:05.66
100 butterfly	Gretchen Walsh; Virginia	46.97; US, AR	Torri Huske; Stanford	48.90	Emma Sticklen; Texas	49.27
200 butterfly	Emma Sticklen; Texas	1:49.11; NC	Alex Walsh; Virginia	1:49.88	Caroline Bricker; Stanford	1:51.55
200 IM	Torri Huske; Stanford	1:49.67	Alex Walsh; Virginia	1:50.14	Lea Polonsky; California	1:51.51
400 IM	Caroline Bricker; Stanford	3:57.36	Emma Weyant; Florida	3:59.05	Lucy Bell; Stanford	4:00.24
200 freestyle relay	Virginia; Gretchen Walsh (20.37) =US, =AR; Claire Curzan (21.18); Maxine Parker (21.56); Anna Moesch (21.34)	1:24.45	Louisville; Caroline Larsen (21.80); Julia Dennis (20.63); Gabi Albiero (21.38); Ella Welch (21.23)	1:25.04	Stanford; Torri Huske (20.92); Lucy Thomas (21.60); Gigi Johnson (21.31); Amy Tang (21.86)	1:25.69
400 freestyle relay	Virginia; Claire Curzan (47.07); Anna Moesch (46.86); Alex Walsh (47.04); Gretchen Walsh (45.04)	3:06.01	Tennessee; Camille Spink (46.90); Josephine Fuller (46.48); Ella Jansen (47.40); Brooklyn Douthwright (47.85)	3:08.64	Louisville; Gabi Albiero (47.51); Julia Dennis (46.52); Caroline Larsen (47.43); Lucy Mehraban (47.25)	3:08.71
800 freestyle relay	Stanford; Caroline Bricker (1:41.73); Aurora Roghair (1:41.89); Lillie Nordmann (1:41.16); Kayla Wilson (1:42.20)	6:46.98	Virginia; Alex Walsh (1:43.04); Aimee Canny (1:42.48); Anna Moesch (1:42.80); Katie Grimes (1:42.97)	6:51.29	Florida; Bella Sims (1:42.55); Julie Brousseau (1:42.72); Emma Weyant (1:44.47); Lainy Kruger (1:43.67)	6:53.41
200 medley relay	Virginia; Claire Curzan (23.17); Alex Walsh (25.62); Gretchen Walsh (20.88); Maxine Parker (21.43)	1:31.10; US, AR	Stanford; Annika Parkhe (24.23); Lucy Thomas (25.71); Gigi Johnson (22.67); Torri Huske (20.39)	1:33.00	Louisville; Abby Karl (24.05); Caroline Larsen (26.28); Gabi Albiero (22.59); Julia Dennis (20.49)	1:33.41
400 medley relay	Virginia; Claire Curzan (49.63); Alex Walsh (56.37); Gretchen Walsh (47.35); Anna Moesch (46.85)	3:20.20; MR	Tennessee; Josephine Fuller (50.21); Mona McSharry (57.32); Sara Stotler (51.01); Camille Spink (46.45)	3:24.99	Florida; Bella Sims (49.54); Anita Bottazzo (57.36); Olivia Peoples (50.65); Micayla Cronk (47.63)	3:25.18

Legend: US – U.S. Open record; NC – NCAA record; MR – Meet record; AR – American record;

== Diving results ==
Event	Gold		Silver		Bronze	
1 m diving	Chiara Pellacani; Miami (FL)	354.65	Mia Vallée; Miami (FL)	333.85	Lanie Gutch; UNC	330.80
3 m diving	Alejandra Estudillo Torres; Texas	389.40	Chiara Pellacani; Miami (FL)	387.60	Skyler Liu; Indiana	382.35
Platform diving	Skyler Liu; Indiana	382.15	Montserrat Lavenant; LSU	375.40	Viviana Del Angel; Minnesota	371.50

== See also ==
- List of college swimming and diving teams
