= Ilya Kharun =

Canadian and American swimmer (born 2005)

Personal information
- National team: Canada (2022–2026); United States (2026–)
- Born: February 7, 2005 (age 21) Montreal, Quebec, Canada
- Height: 1.87 m (6 ft 2 in)

Sport
- Sport: Swimming
- Strokes: Butterfly
- Club: Sandpipers of Nevada
- College team: Arizona State Sun Devils
- Coach: Herbie Behm
Medal record
Men's swimming
Representing Canada
Olympic Games Olympic Games
Bronze medal – third place	2024 Paris	100 m butterfly
Bronze medal – third place	2024 Paris	200 m butterfly
World Championships (LC)
Bronze medal – third place	2025 Singapore	100 m butterfly
World Championships (SC)
Gold medal – first place	2024 Budapest	200 m butterfly
Silver medal – second place	2022 Melbourne	100 m butterfly
Silver medal – second place	2024 Budapest	50 m butterfly
Silver medal – second place	2024 Budapest	4x50 m mixed medley
Silver medal – second place	2024 Budapest	4x50 m mixed freestyle
Bronze medal – third place	2022 Melbourne	4×50 m mixed medley
Bronze medal – third place	2024 Budapest	4x100 m mixed medley

Ilya Kharun (born February 7, 2005) is a Canadian and American competitive swimmer who specializes in the butterfly. He won bronze medals in the 100 m and 200 m butterfly at the 2024 Summer Olympics in Paris.

Kharun was named to the US' team for the 2022 Junior Pan Pacific Championships, but was removed from the team after it was revealed that he was not a US citizen. He was born in Montreal, so he was required to represent Canada. At the 2024 Olympics, he won bronze medals in the 100 and 200 m butterfly events.

In January 2026, Kharun announced his intention to represent the US; he will become eligible in October 2026.

== Early life ==
Kharun was born in Montreal in 2005 as his Ukrainian parents were acrobats who performed there in Cirque du Soleil. The family would eventually move to Las Vegas where they would continue their entertainment careers with Cirque du Soleil.

== Career ==
=== 2022 ===
In May 2022, Kharun was named to the US' team for the Junior Pan Pacific Championships. However, he was removed from the team in August, after USA Swimming was notified that he was not a US Citizen. Kharun's family thought he would be eligible to represent the US, but since he only held a Canadian passport he was required to compete for the nation where he was born.

In November 2022, Kharun competed at the World Cup, making his debut for Canada. He went 49.93 in the 100 m butterfly, breaking the Canadian record of 50.00 set by Joshua Liendo in 2021.

In December 2022, Kharun competed at the World Championships (25 m). He swam in the Mixed 4 × 50 metre medley relay, splitting 22.12 on the butterfly leg; Canada won the bronze medal in a time of 1:36.93. Kharun then swam in the 100 m butterfly. In the heats, he set a Canadian record of 49.66, then lowered the mark to 49.65 in the semifinals. In the final, he won the silver medal in a time of 49.03, which lowered the Canadian record again, and broke the world junior record of 49.53 set by China's Li Zhuhao in 2017.

=== 2023 ===
In March 2023, Kharun competed at the USA Pro Swim Series in Fort Lauderdale. He went 1:54.49 in the 200 m butterfly, breaking the Canadian record of 1:56.27 set by Mackenzie Darragh in 2018.

In July 2023, Kharun competed at the World Championships in Fukuoka. In the 200 m butterfly, he set a Canadian record of 1:54.28 in the semifinals, then in the final, he lowered the mark to 1:53.82, tying with the US' Thomas Heilman for fourth place.

=== 2024 ===
In March 2024, Kharun competed at the NCAA Division I Swimming and Diving Championships in Indianapolis, at the conclusion of his freshman year at Arizona State (ASU). On the first day, he swam in the 200 yd medley relay. He split 19.47 on the butterfly leg; ASU eventually finished second in a time of 1:20.55. The following day, Kharun swam in the 200 yd freestyle relay, splitting 18.48 on the second leg; ASU finished third in a time of 1:13.95. On the third day, Kharun competed in the 400 yd medley relay, splitting 43.44 on the butterfly leg. ASU won their first NCAA swimming relay in the program's history, in a time of 2:57.32; they broke the US Open record of 2:58.32 set by Florida in 2023. On the fourth and final day, Kharun won the 200 yd butterfly in a time of 1:38.26. ASU won the team title, the program's first in Swimming and Diving.

In July 2024, Kharun competed at the Olympic Games in Paris. In the 200 m butterfly, he won the bronze medal in a Canadian record time of 1:52.80. He then won a second bronze medal, this time in the 100 m butterfly, in a time of 50.45. With Liendo winning the silver medal, it was the first time since 1976 that Canada had two athletes on the same Olympic podium.

In December 2024, Kharun competed at the World Championships (25 m) in Budapest. In the 50 m butterfly, he set a Canadian record of 21.84 in the heats. In the final, he improved the mark to 21.67 and won the silver medal. He then competed in the 200 m butterfly. He set a Canadian record of 1:50.11 in the heats, then in the final, he won the gold medal in a time of 1:48.24, lowering the Canadian record again, and tying the championship record set by Japan's Daiya Seto in 2018.

=== 2025 ===
In March 2025, Kharun competed at the NCAA Division I Swimming and Diving Championships in Federal Way, at the conclusion of his Sophomore year. On the first day, he swam in the 200 yd medley relay. He split 18.48 on the butterfly leg; ASU eventually finished fourth in a time of 1:20.87. The following day, Kharun swam in the 200 yd freestyle relay, splitting 18.39 on the first leg; ASU finished second in a time of 1:13.05. The following day, Kharun finished second in the 100 yd butterfly in a time of 43.43. He then competed in the 400 yd medley relay, splitting 42.83 on the butterfly leg; ASU finished third in a time of 2:58.97. On the fourth and final day, Kharun finished third in the 200 yd butterfly in a time of 1:38.74. His final event was the 400 yd freestyle relay, in which he split 41.21 on the first leg; ASU finished second in a time of 2:43.22.

In June 2025, Kharun competed at the Canadian Trials in Victoria, British Columbia. He won the 50 m butterfly in a Canadian record time of 22.68.

In July–August 2025, Kharun competed at the World Championships in Singapore. In the 50 m butterfly, he finished ninth in a time of 22.92, 0.01 behind the eighth qualifier. In the 100 m butterfly, he won the bronze medal in a personal best time of 50.07.

=== 2026 ===
On January 26, 2026, Kharun announced on Instagram he would be switching national allegiances and begin competing for the United States where he studies. Under World Aquatics rules, Kharun will not be able to represent the United States until one year after his release from Swimming Canada, enough time to qualify for the 2028 Summer Olympics.

In February 2026, Kharun competed at the Big 12 Championships in Greensboro, North Carolina. He swam in the 400 yd freestyle relay, splitting 40.86 on the first leg; ASU finished first in a US Open record time of 2:42.15.

In March 2026, Kharun competed at the NCAA Division I Swimming and Diving Championships in Atlanta. On the first day, he swam in the 200 yd medley relay. He split 18.70 on the butterfly leg; ASU finished first in a meet record time of 1:20.07. The following day, Kharun swam in the 100 yd butterfly, finishing third in a time of 42.92. He then swam in the 200 yd freestyle relay, splitting 17.76 on the third leg; ASU finished first in a US Open record time of 1:12.46. The following day, Kharun finished third in the 50 yd freestyle in a time of 18.24. He then competed in the 400 yd medley relay, splitting 42.63 on the butterfly leg; ASU finished first in a time of 2:56.79. On the fourth and final day, Kharun finished first in the 200 yd butterfly in a time of 1:37.66. His final event was the 400 yd freestyle relay, in which he split 41.17 on the first leg; ASU finished first in a time of 2:42.38.

In July 2026, Kharun competed at the US National Championships in Irvine. He went 22.59 in the 50 m butterfly, which was a new personal best and U.S. Open record. He then won the 100 m butterfly in a personal best time of 50.05.

== Personal bests ==
=== Long course (50-metre pool) ===
Event	Time	Venue	Date	Notes	Ref
50 m butterfly	22.59	2026 Toyota National Championships	July 29, 2026		
100 m butterfly	50.05	2026 Toyota National Championships	August 2, 2026		
200 m butterfly	1:52.80	Paris, France	July 31, 2024	NR	

=== Short course (25-metre pool) ===
Event	Time	Venue	Date	Notes	Ref
50 m butterfly	21.67	Danube Arena, Budapest	December 11, 2024	NR, AM	
100 m butterfly	48.35	Toronto Pan Am Sports Centre, Toronto	October 23, 2025		
200 m butterfly	1:48.24	Danube Arena, Budapest	December 12, 2024	NR, AM, CR	
