= Luke Whitlock =

American swimmer (born 2006)

Personal information
- Nationality: American
- Born: March 8, 2006 (age 20)

Sport
- Country: United States
- Sport: Men's swimming
- Strokes: Freestyle
- Club: Fishers Area Swimming Tigers
- College team: Indiana University

Luke Whitlock is an American swimmer. Whitlock placed second in the 800m freestyle at the 2024 US Olympic Swimming Team Trials.
