= Alex Walsh =

American swimmer (born 2001)

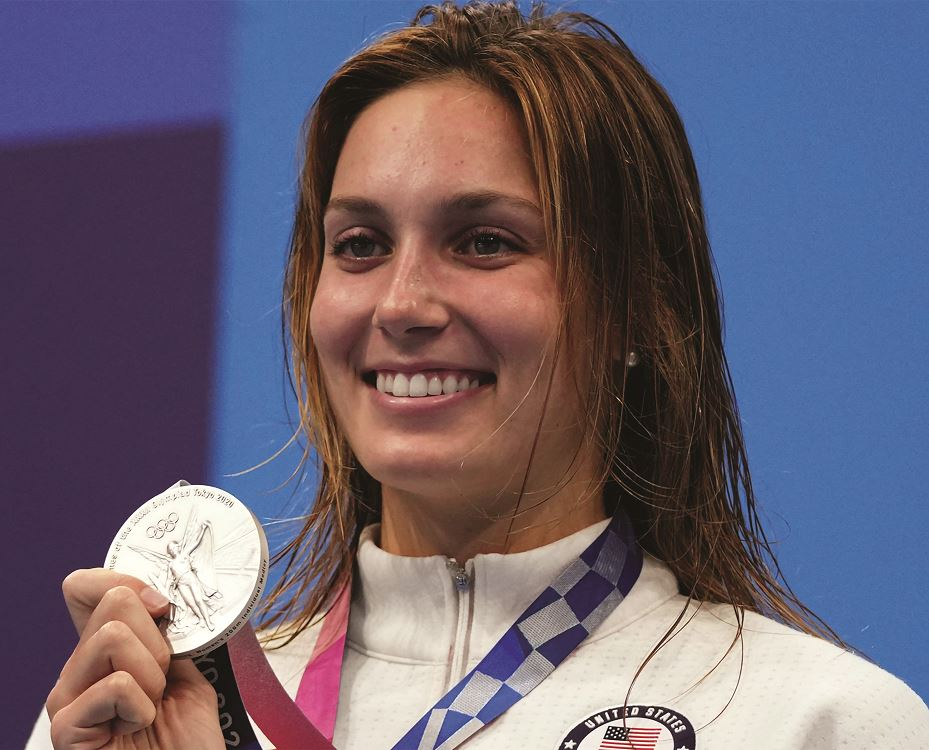
- Walsh with her silver medal at the 2020 Olympic Games

Personal information
- Full name: Alexandra Jane Walsh
- Born: July 31, 2001 (age 25) Nashville, Tennessee, U.S.
- Height: 6 ft 0 in (183 cm)

Sport
- Country: United States
- Sport: Swimming
- Strokes: Medley, freestyle, breaststroke
- Club: Greenwich YWCA Dolphins; Chelsea Piers Aquatic Club; Nashville Aquatic Club
- College team: University of Virginia
- Coach: Todd DeSorbo
Medal record
Women's swimming
Representing the United States
Event	1st	2nd	3rd
Olympic Games	0	1	0
World Championships (LC)	3	2	0
World Championships (SC)	5	4	3
Pan Pacific Championships	0	0	1
Pan American Games	3	0	0
World Junior Championships	0	2	0
Junior Pan Pacific Championships	2	1	0
Total	13	10	4
Olympic Games Olympic Games
Silver medal – second place	2020 Tokyo	200 m medley
World Championships (LC)
Gold medal – first place	2022 Budapest	200 m medley
Gold medal – first place	2022 Budapest	4×200 m freestyle
Gold medal – first place	2022 Budapest	4×100 m medley
Silver medal – second place	2023 Fukuoka	200 m medley
Silver medal – second place	2025 Singapore	200 m medley
World Championships (SC)
Gold medal – first place	2022 Melbourne	4×50 m freestyle
Gold medal – first place	2022 Melbourne	4×100 m medley
Gold medal – first place	2022 Melbourne	4×50 m mixed medley
Gold medal – first place	2024 Budapest	4×200 m freestyle
Gold medal – first place	2024 Budapest	4×100 m medley
Silver medal – second place	2022 Melbourne	200 m medley
Silver medal – second place	2022 Melbourne	4×50 m medley
Silver medal – second place	2024 Budapest	200 m medley
Silver medal – second place	2024 Budapest	4×100 m mixed medley
Bronze medal – third place	2022 Melbourne	4×200 m freestyle
Bronze medal – third place	2024 Budapest	200 m breaststroke
Bronze medal – third place	2024 Budapest	4×50 m mixed medley
Pan Pacific Championships
Bronze medal – third place	2026 Irvine	200 m medley
Pan American Games
Gold medal – first place	2019 Lima	200 m backstroke
Gold medal – first place	2019 Lima	200 m medley
Gold medal – first place	2019 Lima	4×200 m freestyle relay
World Junior Championships
Silver medal – second place	2017 Indianapolis	4×100 m freestyle
Silver medal – second place	2017 Indianapolis	4×100 m medley
Junior Pan Pacific Championships
Gold medal – first place	2018 Suva	200 m medley
Gold medal – first place	2018 Suva	4×100 m freestyle
Silver medal – second place	2016 Maui	200 m medley

Alexandra Jane Walsh (born July 31, 2001) is an American competitive swimmer. She specializes in the individual medley.

Walsh started setting national age group records at age 12. She led her high school team to multiple state and national championships. At the 2019 Pan American Games, she won three gold medals.

From 2020-2025, Walsh competed for the University of Virginia. In her five NCAA Championships, she won 29 medals, including 23 golds, and helped Virginia win team national titles all five times. At the 2020 Olympic Games, she won the silver medal in the 200 m individual medley. She also won three gold medals at the 2022 World Championships and three golds, two silvers, and one bronze at the 2022 Short Course World Championships. At the 2024 Short Course World Championships, she won two golds, two silvers, and two bronzes.

== Swimming career ==
=== Early career ===
Walsh was born in Nashville, Tennessee, in 2001. Her parents are Robert and Glynis Walsh. Glynis also swam competitively and was captain of the Boston College women's swim team in 1993. Walsh has a younger sister, Gretchen Walsh.

The Walsh family moved to Old Greenwich, Connecticut, when Alex was young, and she attended Old Greenwich Elementary School. She began her competitive swimming career at age seven as a member of the Greenwich YWCA Dolphins. She later joined the Chelsea Piers Aquatic Club in Stamford, Connecticut. She swam in the summers for the Rocky Point Club.

At the age of 12, Walsh broke three 11–12 girl's national age group records in the 100 yard individual medley, 100 yard backstroke, and 200 yard breaststroke at the Connecticut Age Group Championships in March 2014. As a 12-year old, her 200-yard breaststroke time of 2:15.64 also set a new pool record at Wesleyan University.

In 2014, the Walsh family moved back to Nashville, Tennessee. There, she competed for the Nashville Aquatic Club, coached by John Morse and Doug Wharam. As a 13-year old, Walsh qualified for the 2016 U.S. Olympic Trials in the 100 and 200 m backstroke events. Later that year, Walsh broke Missy Franklin's national age group record in the 13–14 girl's 200 yard individual medley with a time of 1:56.20.

In June and July, Walsh competed at the 2016 U.S. Olympic Trials in Omaha, Nebraska. She was a semi-finalist in the 100 and 200 m backstroke events, in which she placed 14th and 11th, respectively. Walsh then competed at the 2016 Junior Pan Pacific Championships in Maui, Hawaii, in August. She won a silver medal.

=== High school ===
Walsh attended middle and high school at Harpeth Hall School. She competed at the 2017 Junior World Championships in Indianapolis, Indiana, in August. She swam in the final of the 4 × 100 m freestyle relay, winning a silver medal. Walsh's high school team, coached by Polly Linden, captured the state swimming and diving championship in 2017.

Walsh competed at the 2018 Junior Pan Pacific Championships in Suva, Fiji, in August. She won two gold medals. Walsh continued to break multiple national age group records throughout her high school career. In 2018, she set the NISCA independent school record in the 100 yard breaststroke. Harpeth Hall School repeated as state champions in 2018. They were also named SwimmingWorld national champions.

Walsh competed at the 2019 Pan American Games held in Lima, Peru, in August. In total, she won three gold medals: two individual gold medals in the 200 m individual medley and 200 m backstroke and a gold medal in the 4 × 200 m freestyle relay. Harpeth Hall School was named SwimmingWorld national champions for the second straight year in 2019. Walsh was an eight-time NISCA/Speedo high school swimming All-American.

Walsh competed at the 2019 U.S. Open in Atlanta, Georgia, in December. She won the silver medal behind Olympian Melanie Margalis in the 200 m individual medley. Her time of 2:09.01 shattered the 17–18 girl's national age group record previously set by Elizabeth Pelton in 2011. Walsh graduated from Harpeth Hall School in 2020.

=== 2021 NCAA season ===
Walsh attended the University of Virginia and started competing on their swimming team, coached by Todd DeSorbo, starting in her freshman season of 2020–21. At the 2021 Atlantic Coast Conference (ACC) Championships, Walsh won the 200 yard individual medley, finished third in the 200 yard backstroke, and finished fourth in the 100 yard breaststroke. She swam on four of Virginia's first place relays (200 free relay, 400 free relay, 800 free relay, 400 medley relay).

At the 2021 NCAA Division I Championships in March, Walsh anchored the 4×200 yard freestyle relay to first place, which marked the University of Virginia's first NCAA relay title in program history. Walsh was the NCAA champion in the 200 yard individual medley, finished fifth in the 200 yard breaststroke, and finished fifth in the 200 yard freestyle. She was also part of the 200 and 400 freestyle relays that finished second. Virginia won their first-ever team championship. In April, Walsh was named the ACC Women's Freshman of the Year in swimming and diving.

=== 2020 Olympic Games ===
In June, Walsh competed at the 2020 U.S. Olympic Trials. She won the 200 m individual medley with a time of 2:09.30 to qualify for the 2020 Olympic Games. The race had the closest finish in the history of the Olympic Trials with only 0.04 seconds separating first-place finisher Walsh, second-place finisher Kate Douglass (Walsh's teammate at Virginia), and third-place finisher Madisyn Cox. The race was ranked one of the top moments of the Olympic Trials.

At the 2020 Tokyo Olympics in July, Walsh won silver in the 200 m individual medley. In a thriller of a race, Walsh led down the stretch in the freestyle portion. She finished with a time of 2:08.65, just behind Japan's Yui Ohashi by 0.13 seconds.

=== 2022 NCAA season ===
During her sophomore season at Virginia, Walsh was joined on the team by her younger sister, Gretchen. At the 2022 ACC Championships in February, Alex was a three-time individual champion in the 200 yard individual medley, 200 yard freestyle, and 200 yard breaststroke and also won four relay titles. She was named the ACC Women's Most Valuable Swimmer of the Meet.

At the 2022 NCAA Division I Championships in March, Walsh won three individual titles: the 200 yard individual medley, 400 yard individual medley, and 200 yard butterfly. She set an American, NCAA, U.S. Open, and pool record in the 200 yard individual medley with a time of 1:50.08. She swam on the 400 medley relay, and 400 freestyle relay that broke the NCAA, American, U.S. Open, and pool records. Walsh also participated in the 800 freestyle relay, which placed second. She won a total of six gold medals and one silver medal at the meet, and Virginia won their second straight team national championship. That season, Walsh was a finalist for the Honda Sports Award in swimming and diving, which was won by her teammate Kate Douglass.

=== 2022 World Championships ===
In April, Walsh competed at the 2022 U.S. International Team Trials and qualified for the 2022 World Aquatic Championships team in the 4 × 200 m freestyle relay. She placed sixth in the final with a personal best time of 1:57.82. Walsh also won the 200 m individual medley, setting a new U.S. Open record in the final with a winning time of 2:07.84.

In June, Walsh became a world champion at the 2022 World Championships in Budapest, Hungary. Her gold medal-winning time (2:07:13) in the 200 m individual medley was more than a second faster than the second-place finisher. In that race, she became the second-fastest American of all time and fifth-fastest world performer of all time. In total, she finished the 2022 World Championships as a three-time gold medalist, also winning gold in the 4 × 200 m freestyle relay and 4 × 100 m medley relay. At the 2022 Golden Goggle Awards in September, Walsh was a nominee for Female Athlete of the Year.

In December, Walsh competed at the 2022 Short Course World Championships in Melbourne, Australia. She won three gold medals, two silver medals, and one bronze medal, participating in one individual event and five relays. In the 200 m individual medley, Kate Douglass and Alex Walsh finished first (2:02.12) and second (2:03.37), respectively. Both swimmers broke the previous American record and became the only American women to ever break 2:04. Walsh swam the first leg of the 4 × 200 m freestyle relay, which won bronze and broke the American record with a time of 7:34.70.

=== 2023 NCAA season ===
At the 2023 ACC Championships, Walsh won the 200 yard freestyle, 100 yard breaststroke, and 200 yard breaststroke. She was also a part of four relay wins.

At the 2023 NCAA Division I Championships in March, Walsh won three medals in her individual events. She won the silver medal in the 200 yard butterfly, the bronze medal in the 200 yard individual medley, and the gold medal in the 400 yard individual medley. Virginia won all five relay events, and Walsh swam on four of them. Virginia won their third straight national championship.

=== 2023 World Championships ===
In June and July, Walsh competed at the 2023 U.S. National Championships. She won silver medals in the 200 m individual medley and 400 m individual medley and was named to the 2023 World Championships team.

At the 2023 World Championships in July, Walsh won a silver medal in the 200 m individual medley as part of an American one-two finish with Kate Douglass. Walsh then finished fourth in the 400 m individual medley.

=== 2024 NCAA season ===
In 2024, Walsh helped Virginia win their fifth straight ACC Championship. She won the 200 yard breaststroke, 200 yard butterfly, and 200 yard individual medley. Her time of 1:49.16 in the 200 yard butterfly was an NCAA record. Walsh was also a part of four winning relay teams. By the end of the meet, she had 26 career first-place finishes at the ACC Championships, passing her former teammate Kate Douglass for the most ever.

At the 2024 NCAA Division I Championships in March, Walsh helped Virginia win their fourth straight team national championship. She won gold medals in the 200 yard breaststroke, 200 yard individual medley, and 400 yard individual medley, while setting personal bests in all three events. She also won gold medals in the 200 yard freestyle relay, 400 yard freestyle relay, and 400 yard medley relay. Walsh was a finalist for the Honda Sports Award in swimming and diving for the second time, with the award going to her sister Gretchen.

In May, Walsh graduated from the University of Virginia with a degree in computer science.

=== 2024 Olympic Games ===
Walsh competed at the 2024 U.S. Olympic Trials in June. She finished sixth in the 100 m breaststroke and then finished third in the 200 m breaststroke in personal best times. In her final event, the 200 m individual medley, she finished second and made the Olympic team.

At the 2024 Olympic Games, Walsh initially finished third in the 200 m individual medley but was disqualified due to an illegal transition from backstroke to breaststroke.

In December, Walsh competed at the 2024 Short Course World Championships. She won the silver medal in the 200 m individual medley and the bronze medal in the 200 m breaststroke. Walsh also swam in four relay events. Overall, she won two gold medals, two silver medals, and two bronze medals during the meet.

=== 2025 NCAA season ===
Due to the COVID-19 season during her freshman year, Walsh had five years of eligibility in the NCAA and competed in the 2024–25 season. At the 2025 ACC Championships in February, she won the gold medal in the 200 yard breaststroke, the gold medal in the 200 yard butterfly, and the bronze medal in the 100 yard butterfly. Walsh also won four gold medals in the relays. In her career at the ACC Championships, she won 32 total golds and 12 individual golds, which were both all-time records.

Walsh competed at the 2025 NCAA Division I Championships in March. She won the gold medal in the 100 yard breaststroke, the silver medal in the 200 yard butterfly, and the silver medal in the 200 yard individual medley, becoming the second swimmer after Tracy Caulkins to win NCAA titles in five different individual events. Walsh also won three gold medals and one silver medal in the relays. Virginia won their fifth straight national championship.

Walsh finished her college career with 29 NCAA Championship medals. Her 23 golds included nine individual titles. She was the first swimmer to be a part of five straight national championship teams.

=== 2025 World Championships ===
In June, Walsh competed at the 2025 U.S. National Championships. She won the silver medal in the 200 m breaststroke, finished fifth in the 50 m breaststroke, won the bronze medal in the 100 m breaststroke, and won the gold medal in the 200 m individual medley.

At the 2025 World Championships in July, Walsh won the silver medal in the 200 m individual medley.

== Outside the pool ==
Walsh was featured in Mary Ellen Pethel's book entitled Title IX, Pat Summit, and Tennessee's Trailblazers: 50 Years, 50 Stories. The book was published in 2022 to celebrate the 50th anniversary of Title IX and to honor female athletes and coaches with connections to the state of Tennessee. Walsh spoke about opportunities available for current NCAA athletes after the passage of the NCAA NIL (name image likeness) Policy in 2021. She also discussed the social pressures that come with being an athlete on social media. When commenting about her future, she was quoted as saying "I've come a long way, but I've still got a long way to go."

Walsh and her sister Gretchen were the first NCAA athletes (and set of siblings) to launch an apparel line with a major retailer after the passage of the NIL. In September 2022, Alex and Gretchen released a collaboration with Sporti by Swimoutlet.com and created their swimsuit line called Sporti x Alex + Gretchen Walsh.

== Personal best times ==
=== Long course (50 m) ===
Event	Time	Meet	Location	Date	Note(s)	Ref
200 m freestyle	1:57.82	2022 U.S. International Team Trials	Greensboro, North Carolina	April 27, 2022		
200 m breaststroke	2:22.38	2024 U.S. Olympic Trials	Indianapolis, Indiana	June 20, 2024		
200 m individual medley	2:07.13	2022 World Championships	Budapest, Hungary	June 19, 2022		
400 m individual medley	4:34.46	2023 World Championships	Fukuoka, Japan	July 30, 2023		

=== Short course (25 m) ===
Event	Time		Meet	Location	Date	Note(s)	Ref
200 m freestyle	1:53.25	r	2024 World Championships (25 m)	Budapest, Hungary	December 12, 2024		
200 m breaststroke	2:16.83		2024 World Championships (25 m)	Budapest, Hungary	December 13, 2024		
200 m individual medley	2:02.65		2024 World Championships (25 m)	Budapest, Hungary	December 10, 2024		

=== Short course (25 yd) ===
Event	Time	Meet	Location	Date	Note(s)	Ref
200 yd freestyle	1:41.63	2023 ACC Championships	Greensboro, North Carolina	February 16, 2023		
100 yd breaststroke	56.49	2025 NCAA Division I Championships	Federal Way, Washington	March 21, 2025		
200 yd breaststroke	2:02.07	2024 NCAA Division I Championships	Athens, Georgia	March 23, 2024		
200 yd butterfly	1:49.16	2024 ACC Championships	Greensboro, North Carolina	February 23, 2024		
200 yd individual medley	1:49.20	2024 NCAA Division I Championships	Athens, Georgia	March 21, 2024		
400 yd individual medley	3:55.97	2024 NCAA Division I Championships	Athens, Georgia	March 22, 2024		

Legend: AM – Americas record; e – equalled existing record; NR – American record; US – US Open record;
Records not set in finals: h – heat; sf – semifinal; r – relay 1st leg; rh – relay heat 1st leg; b – B final; † – en route to final mark; so – swim-off; tt – time trial
