= Tristan Jankovics =

Canadian swimmer (born 2004)

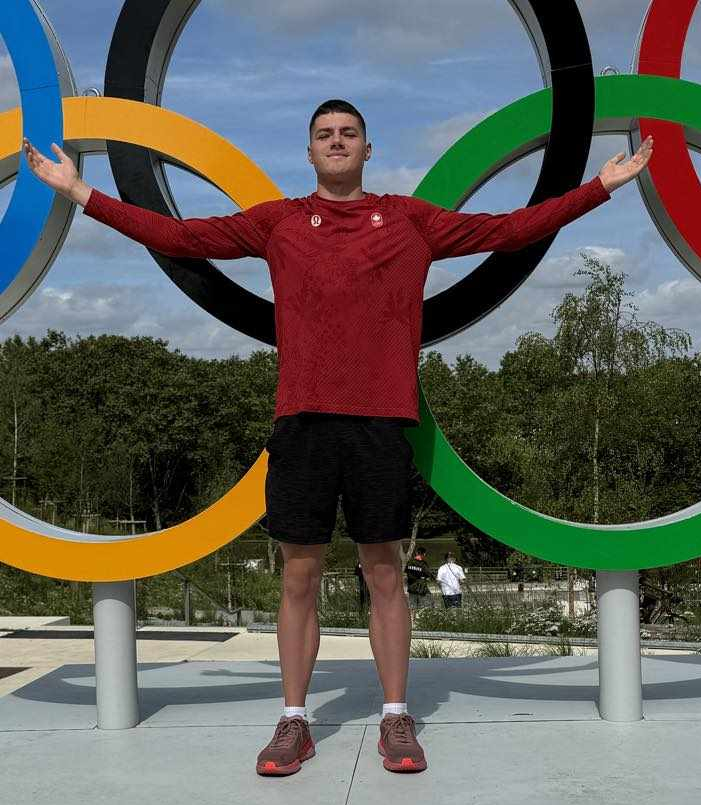
- Jankovics in 2024

Personal information
- Born: May 10, 2004 (age 22) Guelph, Ontario, Canada
- Home town: Puslinch, Ontario, Canada
- Height: 1.98 m (6 ft 6 in)
- Weight: 90.5 kg (200 lb)

Sport
- Country: Canada
- Sport: Swimming
- Strokes: Medley

Tristan Jankovics (born May 10, 2004) is a Canadian competitive swimmer, primarily competing in the medley events. Jankovics was born in Guelph and grew up in Puslinch.

== Career ==
In 2024 at the Canadian trials, Jankovics dropped five seconds from his previous best in the 400 metres individual medley event and went under the Olympic A standard. At the conclusion of the 2024 Canadian Swim trials, Jankovics was named to Canada's 2024 Olympics team.

=== 2024 World Championships Budapest ===
Tristan Jankovic represented Canada at the 2024 World Championships in Budapest, held from December 10 to 15, 2024. Tristan swam in the 400-meter individual medley and set a new Canadian record in the heats, which is now 4:02.01, placing him first in his heat. The record was 21 years old and was set by Brian Johns, and at the time it was a world record.

Swim style results

- Butterfly 55.15
- Backstroke 1:01.19
- Breaststroke 1:09.15
- Freestyle 56.52

With this new result, Jankovic qualified for the final in third place overall. In the final, he swam the course in a time of 4:00.57, which was only good enough for sixth place.

== Personal life ==
Jankovics attends Ohio State University.
