= Jack Alexy =

American swimmer (born 2003)

Personal information
- Full name: John Carroll Alexy
- National team: United States
- Born: January 19, 2003 (age 23) Morristown, New Jersey, U.S.
- Height: 6 ft 8 in (203 cm)
- Weight: 215 lb (98 kg)

Sport
- Sport: Swimming
- Strokes: Freestyle, Backstroke
- Club: California Aquatics, Greater Somerset County YMCA (former)
- College team: University of California, Berkeley
Medal record
Men's swimming
Representing the United States
| Event | 1st | 2nd | 3rd |
|---|---|---|---|
| Olympic Games | 1 | 1 | 0 |
| World Championships (LC) | 2 | 4 | 4 |
| World Championships (SC) | 2 | 2 | 1 |
| Pan Pacific Championships | 3 | 1 | 0 |
| World Junior Championships | 1 | 0 | 0 |
| Total | 9 | 8 | 5 |
Olympic Games
| Gold medal – first place | 2024 Paris | 4×100 m freestyle |
| Silver medal – second place | 2024 Paris | 4×100 m medley |
World Championships (LC)
| Gold medal – first place | 2023 Fukuoka | 4×100 m medley |
| Gold medal – first place | 2025 Singapore | 4×100 m mixed freestyle |
| Silver medal – second place | 2023 Fukuoka | 50 m freestyle |
| Silver medal – second place | 2023 Fukuoka | 100 m freestyle |
| Silver medal – second place | 2023 Fukuoka | 4×100 m mixed freestyle |
| Silver medal – second place | 2025 Singapore | 100 m freestyle |
| Bronze medal – third place | 2023 Fukuoka | 4×100 m freestyle |
| Bronze medal – third place | 2025 Singapore | 50 m freestyle |
| Bronze medal – third place | 2025 Singapore | 4×100 m freestyle |
| Bronze medal – third place | 2025 Singapore | 4×100 m medley |
World Championships (SC)
| Gold medal – first place | 2024 Budapest | 100 m freestyle |
| Gold medal – first place | 2024 Budapest | 4×100 m freestyle |
| Silver medal – second place | 2024 Budapest | 4×100 m medley |
| Silver medal – second place | 2024 Budapest | 4×100 m mixed medley |
| Bronze medal – third place | 2024 Budapest | 50 m freestyle |
Pan Pacific Championships
| Gold medal – first place | 2026 Irvine | 100 m freestyle |
| Gold medal – first place | 2026 Irvine | 4×100 m freestyle |
| Gold medal – first place | 2026 Irvine | 4×100 m medley |
| Silver medal – second place | 2026 Irvine | 50 m freestyle |
World Junior Championships
| Gold medal – first place | 2019 Budapest | 4×100 m freestyle |

John Carroll Alexy (/əˈlɛksi/ ə-LEK-see; born January 19, 2003) is an American swimmer. He currently swims collegiately for the California Golden Bears. He represented the United States at the 2024 Summer Olympics in Paris. He is the grandson of former basketball player Bill Ebben.

== Career ==
Raised in Mendham Borough, New Jersey, Alexy attended Delbarton School where he won state titles at the New Jersey State Interscholastic Athletic Association Meet of Champions in the 50- and 100-meter freestyle events as a freshman and again as a junior, joining two of his three siblings who also won state swimming individual titles.

At the 2019 FINA World Junior Swimming Championships, Alexy earned a gold medal with Team USA in the 4 × 100 m freestyle relay. He split a 50.26 as the lead-off leg in the preliminary heats.

In 2021 during the 2020 United States Olympic trials, Alexy recorded a new best time of 48.69, considerably less than his previous personal best of 49.31, which had been used as his entry time and seeded him in 21st position. He also broke Caeleb Dressel's National Age Group record of 48.78, which had been set in 2015 during the United States Nationals.

=== 2023 ===
==== Collegiate season ====
At the 2023 Pacific 12 Championships, Alexy recorded personal bests in his three individual events (50 free, 100 free, 100 back). Furthermore, his new best time of 41.42 in the 100 free placed second behind his teammate, Bjorn Seeliger.

At the 2023 NCAA Championships, Alexy qualified for his first A final in the 50 yard freestyle after placing 5th in the prelims with a best time of 18.77. At the finals session, he placed 6th overall while contributing to Cal's second-place finish in the 200 freestyle Relay. On Day 4, Alexy swam a new personal best of 40.88 in the preliminaries of the 100 yard freestyle, taking the top seed entering the A final. In the final evening of the competition, Alexy earned two silver medals after finishing second in the 100 yard freestyle and the 400 freestyle relay. Cal won the team championship.

==== Long course season ====
In April, at the TYR Pro Swim Series - Westmont meet, Alexy won the 50 meter freestyle in a personal best time of 22.09. He placed second in the 100 meter freestyle with a time of 48.85.

At the Phillips 66 USA National Championships, Alexy qualified to represent the United States at the 2023 World Aquatics Championships in Fukuoka, Japan. His performances at the meet qualified him to swim the 50m and 100m freestyle events. On June 27, 2023, Alexy won the 100m Freestyle with a time of 47.93. He set a personal best time of 47.75 in the prelims. On July 1, 2023, Alexy placed second in the 50m Freestyle with a personal best time of 21.63. He outswam Michael Andrew (swimmer) by a hundredth of a second, denying him a spot on the World Championship roster. Alexy also placed 10th in the 50m backstroke with a time of 25.14.

His breakthrough season culminated at the 2023 World Aquatics Championships in which he earned five medals for Team USA in his senior international debut. Individually, Alexy won two silver medals: in the 50m and 100m Freestyle events. In the 100m event, after qualifying in 8th place for the final after a poor dive in the semifinals, Alexy posted a new best time of 47.31. In the 50m event, Alexy posted a time of 21.57, which put him one hundredth ahead of Ben Proud in third place. Alexy also claimed three more medals in representing relays for the United States. He won gold in the Men's 4 × 100 metre medley relay after posting a 47.00 freestyle split. He also earned a silver medal in the Mixed 4 × 100 metre freestyle relay after swimming a 47.68 leadoff leg, and a bronze medal in the Men's 4 × 100 metre freestyle relay after swimming a 47.68 split.

=== 2024 ===
==== Collegiate season ====
Alexy opted out of the 2024 Pacific 12 Championships to instead swim at a TYR Pro Swim Series meet in Westmont, Illinois. Alexy won the 100 meter freestyle with a time of 48.37 and placed second in the 50 meter freestyle with a time of 21.86. Additionally, he swam the 200 meter freestyle in a time of 2:15.50.

On night one of the 2024 NCAA Championships, Alexy played a pivotal role in both relays. In the 200 Medley Relay, he anchored Cal to a fourth-place finish with a split time of 18.40. Additionally, he contributed to Cal's victory in the 800 Free Relay with a flying start split of 1:30.50, setting a new NCAA record of 6:02.26. On Day 2, Alexy competed in the 50 Free from a flat start three times, achieving new personal bests each time. He swam an 18.44 in the prelims, followed by an 18.38 in the finals, and led off Cal in the 200 Free Relay with a time of 18.40. Alexy secured medals in both events, finishing second in the relay and third in the 50 Free. On Day 3, Alexy made his NCAA Championship debut in the 200 Freestyle and recorded a time of 1:29.75 in the final to place second. He dropped almost three seconds off his entry time of 1:32.74, and prior to this collegiate season, Alexy had never been under 1:35. On the final day of competition, Alexy placed third in the 100 yard freestyle after swimming a personal best times of 40.80 and 40.59 in the prelims and finals respectively. Alexy also contributed to Cal's third-place finish in the 400 Free Relay with a lead off split of 40.79. Cal placed second behind the Arizona State Sun Devils; out of the 444.5 points they scored, Alexy contributed 49 of them with his individual performances and 136 through the relays.

==== Long course season ====
At the 2024 United States Olympic trials, Alexy opted to enter the 50 and 100 meter freestyle events. He led the preliminary heats in the 100 meter event with a new personal best time of 47.08. In the finals, he placed second behind Chris Guiliano with a time of 47.47, earning him the right to represent the United States at the 2024 Summer Olympics in both the 100 meter freestyle and 4 × 100 meter freestyle relay. In the 50 meter free, Alexy also made the final, finishing in fourth place with a time of 21.76. He had set a seasons best mark in the semi-finals of 21.66.

During the first finals session of the Olympic swimming competition, the team of Alexy, Guiliano, Armstrong, and Dressel earned the gold medal in the 4 × 100 meter freestyle relay. Alexy led off with a time of 47.67 and helped Team USA secure their first gold at the 2024 Olympic Games. In his only individual event, the 100 meter freestyle, Alexy's time of 47.57 was the top time in the preliminaries; he followed this performance with a 6th-place finish in the semi-finals. In the final, Alexy placed 7th with a time of 47.96, behind a world record performance by Pan Zhanle of 46.40, and ahead of his teammate Giuliano. Alexy also earned a silver medal by swimming the freestyle leg in the preliminaries of the 4 × 100 meter medley relay.

== International championships ==
| Meet | 50 freestyle | 100 freestyle | 4×100 freestyle | 4×100 medley | 4×100 mixed freestyle |
|---|---|---|---|---|---|
| WJ 2019 | | | (gold) ^{[a]} | | |
| WC 2023 | 2nd place, silver medalist(s) | 2nd place, silver medalist(s) | 3rd place, bronze medalist(s) | 1st place, gold medalist(s) | 2nd place, silver medalist(s) |
| OG 2024 | | 7th | 1st place, gold medalist(s) | (silver) ^{[a]} | —N/a |

^{a} Alexy swam only in the preliminaries.

== Personal best times ==
=== Long course meters (50 m pool) ===
| Event | Time | | Meet | Location | Date | Ref |
|---|---|---|---|---|---|---|
| 50m freestyle | 21.36 | | 2025 USA Swimming Championships | Indianapolis, Indiana | June 7, 2025 | |
| 100m freestyle | 46.81 | s | 2025 World Aquatics Championships | Singapore | July 30, 2025 | |
| 50m backstroke | 25.14 | h | Phillips 66 USA National Championships | Indianapolis, Indiana | June 29, 2023 | |
| 100m backstroke | 55.47 | h | 2020 United States Olympic trials (swimming) | Omaha, Nebraska | June 17, 2021 | |

Legend: h — prelims heat, s - semifinal

=== Short course yards (25 yd pool) ===
| Event | Time | | Meet | Location | Date | Ref |
|---|---|---|---|---|---|---|
| 50yd freestyle | 18.38 | | 2024 NCAA Championships | Indianapolis, Indiana | March 28, 2024 | |
| 100yd freestyle | 40.36 | | 2025 NCAA Championships | Federal Way, Washington | March 29, 2025 | |
| 200yd freestyle | 1:29.75 | | 2024 NCAA Championships | Indianapolis, Indiana | March 29, 2024 | |
| 100yd backstroke | 45.62 | h | 2023 NCAA Championships | Minneapolis, Minnesota | March 24, 2023 | |

Legend: h — prelims heat
