= David Johnston (swimmer) =

American swimmer

Personal information
- Nationality: American
- Born: October 28, 2001 (age 24) Dallas, Texas, U.S.

Sport
- Country: United States
- Sport: Men's swimming
- Strokes: Freestyle
- Club: Dallas Mustangs; Rockwall Aquatic Center; The Swim Team (Lake Forest, CA)
- College team: University of Texas
- Coach: Eddie Reese, B. Bowman (UT); Mark Schubert ('24 Olympics)

David Johnston is an American swimmer who competed for the University of Texas, and participated in the 2024 Paris Olympics in the 1500-meter freestyle.

Johnston was born in Dallas, Texas on October 28, 2001 and attended the Covenant School in Dallas. At 16, in 2017, he and his sister Carolyn captured three medals swimming in the Division III Texas State Championships. Johnston swam for several clubs during his swimming career including the Dallas Mustangs, the Rockwall Aquatic Center of Excellence, and Flower Mound's Lakeside Aquatic Club.

== University of Texas ==
Johnston attended and swam for the University of Texas beginning around 2021. He trained and competed under Hall of Fame Head Coach Eddie Reese, and after 2024, by incoming Head Coach Bob Bowman. Johnston was a member of Texas's 2021 NCAA National Championship Team, and in 2022 swam for Texas's NCAA National Championship runner-up team. While at Texas, Johnston captured 3 consecutive Big 12 Conference titles and as a Senior won his first Southeastern Conference title in the 1650-yard freestyle with a personal best time of 14:26.00. During his tenure with the Texas Longhorn swim team, Johnston was an All-American eight times, in the 500 free twice from 2022-3, the 1650 free three times from 2021-2023, and the 400 IM three times from 2021-2023.

Johnston qualified to compete for the United States and was selected by USA Swimming to participate in the 2024 World Aquatics Championships held in Dohar, Qatar. Johnston qualified in the 400m freestyle and 400m individual Medley.

== 2024 Paris Olympics ==
Johnston trained for the 2024 Olympics in Lake Forest, California with Mark Schubert's "The Swim Team". He placed third in the 400m freestyle at the 2024 US Olympic Team Trials in Indianapolis. On June 23, he placed first and qualified in the Olympic trial finals of the 1500-meter freestyle with a time of 14:52.74, and in a close finish placed just ahead of second place Luke Whitlock who swam a 14:53.00 in a very close finish.

After travelling to Paris with the U.S. Olympic team, Johnston finished 18th in the 1500-meter freestyle at the 2024 Paris Olympics. He was scheduled to compete in the 10 kilometer swim in the River Seine but did not compete. Before swimming the 1500, he had tested positive for COVID in late July during the Olympics, and observed a period of isolation.

=== Honors ===
Making an early impression in his Freshman year, Johnston was voted Newcomer of the Week for the Big 12 on Jan. 27, 2021. With solid academic skills, he was a member of the CSCAA Scholar All-American First Team in three years, was an All-Big 12 First Team Academic honoree, and made the Big 12 Commissioner's Honor Roll in six semesters.
