= Jonathon Marshall =

British swimmer

Jonny Marshall
Personal information
- Full name: Jonathon Marshall
- Nationality: British (English)
- Born: 15 November 2004 (age 21) Akron, Ohio, United States
- Home town: Southend-on-Sea, Great Britain

Sport
- Sport: Swimming
- Event: Backstroke
- University team: University of Florida
- Club: Carnegie; Gator Swim Club
Medal record
Representing Great Britain
European Junior Championships
Gold medal – first place	2022 Otopeni	4x100 m medley
Silver medal – second place	2022 Otopeni	50 m backstroke
Silver medal – second place	2022 Otopeni	4x100 m mixed medley
Bronze medal – third place	2022 Otopeni	100 m backstroke
Representing the Florida Gators
NCAA Championships
Silver medal – second place	2025 NCAA	100 y backstroke
SEC Championships
Gold medal – first place	2024 SEC	100 y backstroke
Gold medal – first place	2024 SEC	200 y backstroke
Gold medal – first place	2024 SEC	4x100 y medley

Jonathon Marshall (born 15 November 2004) is an English swimmer of American descent. He has a dual citizenship with United States and Great Britain. Marshall specializes in backstroke events and competed at the 2024 Summer Olympics.

Marshall is a three time champion in the SEC championships. He holds the SEC meet and Florida Gators team record in the 200y backstroke and 400y medley relay.

Marshall holds the fastest 100y backstroke for a freshman in NCAA history with a time of 44.12.

== Early life ==
Marshall was born on 15 November 2004, in Akron, Ohio, the son of Steve and Louise Marshall. Both Steve and Louise were swimmers for the University of Cincinnati. Louise represented Great Britain on the National Team.

Marshall attended Firestone high school in Akron, Ohio. While swimming at Firestone, Marshall set five of the eight individual school records. He committed to swim for the University of Florida beginning in the 2023-2024 season.

== Career ==
Marshall won a four medals at 2022 European Junior Swimming Championships, a gold in the 4 × 100 m medley relay, a silver in the 50 m backstroke, a bronze in the 100 m backstroke and a mixed relay silver. He also made his senior debut for Great Britain in 2022 at the 2022 European Aquatics Championships.

In his freshman year at the 2024 Southeastern Conference championships, Marshall won the 100 yard backstroke in 44.12 besting runner up Adam Chaney. This mark lands Marshall as the fastest freshman in NCAA history in the event. Marshall also won the 200 yard backstroke in a time of 1:36.68, setting the SEC meet record in the event. He led off the school-record setting and SEC champion 400y medley relay with a 1:56.21 200y backstroke on their way to a 3:00:49 finish. At the NCAA championships, Marshall placed eighth and fourth in the 100 yard backstroke and 200 yard backstroke respectively.

In 2024, Marshall finished second in the 100 metres backstroke at the 2024 Aquatics GB Swimming Championships. His time of 53.03 seconds, behind Oliver Morgan (who won the event in a national record) was fast enough to meet the British consideration criteria for a place at the 2024 Summer Olympics. He was subsequently named in the British team for the Olympics.

At the 2024 Paris Olympics, Marshall swam a 53.93 in prelims to qualify through to semifinals in the 16th spot. In semifinals, Marshall swam 53.46 to finish in 14th place. In 2025, Marshall finished second to Oliver Morgan in both the 50m and 100m backstroke titles at the 2025 Aquatics GB Swimming Championships and earned selection for the 2025 World Aquatics Championships in Singapore.
