= Chris Guiliano =

American swimmer

Personal information
- Born: June 25, 2003 (age 23) Douglassville, Pennsylvania, U.S.
- Height: 6 ft 5 in (196 cm)
- Weight: 208 lb (94 kg)

Sport
- Country: United States
- Sport: Men's swimming
- Strokes: Freestyle
- Club: TOPS Swim Club
- College team: University of Notre Dame; University of Texas
- Coach: Chris Lindauer (Notre Dame); Bob Bowman (Texas)
Medal record
Men's swimming
Representing the United States
Event	1st	2nd	3rd
Olympic Games	1	1	0
World Championships (LC)	1	1	2
World Championships (SC)	1	0	0
Pan Pacific Championships	1	0	1
Total	4	2	3
Olympic Games
Gold medal – first place	2024 Paris	4×100 m freestyle
Silver medal – second place	2024 Paris	4x200 m freestyle
World Championships (LC)
Gold medal – first place	2025 Singapore	4x100 m mixed freestyle
Silver medal – second place	2023 Fukuoka	4×100 m mixed freestyle
Bronze medal – third place	2023 Fukuoka	4×100 m freestyle
Bronze medal – third place	2025 Singapore	4×100 m freestyle
World Championships (SC)
Gold medal – first place	2024 Budapest	4×100 m freestyle
Pan Pacific Championships
Gold medal – first place	2026 Irvine	4×100 m freestyle
Bronze medal – third place	2026 Irvine	4×100 m medley

Chris Guiliano (/dʒuːliˈɑːnoʊ/ goo-ee-lee-AH-noh; born June 25, 2003) is an American swimmer who swam for the University of Notre Dame, and was a gold medalist in the 4x100-meter relay and a silver medalist in the 4x200-meter relay at the 2024 Paris Summer Olympics .

== Biography ==
=== Early life and swimming ===
Guiliano was born June 25, 2003, in Douglassville, Pennsylvania, to Joseph and Cecelia Guiliano. He began his swimming career around the age of eight, later attending Daniel Boone High School in Berks County, Pennsylvania, where he lettered in swimming all four years and was an honor roll student. At Daniel Boone, he was a team Captain as a Senior and a three-time MVP. He trained and competed with the TOPS swimming club of Pennsburg, and Pottstown, Pennsylvania while in High School where he was named an MVP in two years.

At the high points of his high school swimming career, he was an All-State swimmer in 2019-2020, and named an All American three times primarily for his achievements in individual freestyle and relay events. In one of his more significant swims, he placed first at the 2020 Pennsylvania High School 3A State Championships in the 200 freestyle with an improved time of 1:35.81, having never previously gone under a time of 1:39. In the 100 freestyle, he improved to 44.29, and in the 50 freestyle, improved to 20.27.

=== University of Notre Dame ===
Guiliano attended Notre Dame University from 2021-2024 under Coach Chris Lindauer. Guiliano majored in Economics and Notre Dame, minoring in computer and digital technologies. A talented and experience coach, Lindauer began at Notre Dame in 2022, having formerly Coached at the University of Louisville. With a dominating selection of talented swimmers that included Guiliano, the Notre Dame Swim team went 11-1 in Dual Meets from 2022-24. In his Junior year, Guiliano was selected as an All American six times with five first team selections, and one honorable mention. He was a 2024 NCAA qualifier in the 50, 100, and 200-yard freestyle, and an ACC champion four times that year. He formerly qualified for the NCAA's in 2022 and 2023. Guliano held Notre Dame school records in the 50, 100 and 200-yard freestyle, and was part of relay teams that held records in all five relays. He made the ACC Academic Honor Roll his Senior Year, was voted team MVP, and served as team Captain.

=== Senior year, University of Texas ===
After the University of Note Dame's swimming team was suspended by the University for one year for gambling, Guiliano announced he would transfer to the University of Texas in his final year of eligibility as a Senior in the 2024-5 season. Swimming for the University of Texas, under Hall of Fame Head Coach Bob Bowman and Associate Coach Eric Posegay, Guiliano was on a victorious 200 medley relay team that earned Texas's tenth fastest time. He recorded a 19.04 in the 50 freestyle, and won the 100 free with a time of 41.89.

As a member of the U.S. team in 2023, at the World Aquatic Championships in Fukuoka and the U.S. Open, he captured both silver and bronze medals. At the 2023 World Aquatic Championships, his bronze medal was in the 4x100-meter freestyle and his silver medal in the mixed 4x100 freestyle relays. At the 2024 World Championships in Budapest, he earned a Gold Medal in the 4x100-meter Freestyle relay.

== 2024 Paris Olympic relay medals ==
At the 2024 Olympic trials, Guiliano qualified in two relays, the 4x100 and 4x200 meter freestyle and in three individual events, including the 50, 100 and 200 meter freestyle. His 200-meter qualifying time of 1:45.38 exceeded expectations, and landed him in a close second place, giving him a berth in the event only a half a second behind first place qualifier Luke Hobson of the University of Texas, where Guiliano would later enroll in his senior year in college.

At the 2024 Paris Olympic competition, Guiliano captured two medals. He earned America's first gold medal of the games in the 4×100 free relay, where swimming a speedy second leg with Americans Hunter Armstrong, Jack Alexy, and Caeleb Dressel as anchor, he helped record a combined team time of 3:09.28.

He won a silver medal in the 4×200 free relay with the team of Drew Kibler, Brooks Curry, and Blake Pieroni, recording a second place finals time of 7:05.57.

In individual events, Guiliano placed eighth in the Men's 100-meter Freestyle with a 47.98, making the finals, but finishing out of medal contention. In the 50-meter freestyle, he placed seventeenth, and in the 200-meter freestyle, he placed nineteenth.

=== Honors ===
While at Notre Dame, Guiliano received the Blanchard Award in 2023. Named for former Notre Dame swimmer Dr. Charles Blanchard, and created by the University in 1965, the award is given annually to the swimmer with the most outstanding team leadership skills.

In his 2018-19 swimming season in High School, Guiliano was named a Berks County Player of the Year. He was a 2024 ACC Conference Swimmer of the Year in 2023 and received recognition as the ACC Swimmer of the week on numerous occasions.
