= Luke Hobson =

American swimmer (born 2003)

Personal information
- Born: June 25, 2003 (age 23) Reno, Nevada, U.S.
- Height: 6 ft 4 in (193 cm)

Sport
- Country: United States
- Sport: Men's swimming
- Strokes: Freestyle
- Club: Lakeridge Swim Team; Reno, Nevada
- College team: University of Texas
- Coach: Sharon Weis (Lakeridge Swim Team); Bob Bowman (U. of Texas)
Medal record
Men's swimming
Representing the United States
Olympic Games
Silver medal – second place	2024 Paris	4×200 m freestyle
Bronze medal – third place	2024 Paris	200 m freestyle
World Championships (LC)
Gold medal – first place	2024 Doha	4×100 m medley
Silver medal – second place	2023 Fukuoka	4×200 m freestyle
Silver medal – second place	2025 Singapore	200 m freestyle
Bronze medal – third place	2024 Doha	200 m freestyle
Bronze medal – third place	2024 Doha	4×100 m freestyle
Bronze medal – third place	2024 Doha	4×200 m freestyle
World Championships (SC)
Gold medal – first place	2024 Budapest	200 m freestyle
Gold medal – first place	2024 Budapest	4×100 m freestyle
Gold medal – first place	2024 Budapest	4×200 m freestyle
Pan Pacific Championships
Gold medal – first place	2026 Irvine	200 m freestyle
Gold medal – first place	2026 Irvine	4×200 m freestyle

Luke Hobson (born June 25, 2003) is an American swimmer, who competed for the University of Texas, and was a 2024 Summer Olympics team member for the United States, where he won a silver in the 4x200-meter freestyle relay and a bronze medal in the individual 200-meter freestyle events.

He holds the world record in the 200 meter freestyle (short course), and the US Open and American records in the 200 yard freestyle.

== Early life ==
Hobson was born in Reno, Nevada on June 5, 2003, and attended Reno High School, graduating in 2021. As both his parents were collegiate swimmers, Hobson took up swimming early beginning at the age of eight, and swam for the Lakeridge Swim Team under Coach Sharon Weiss.

== Career ==
=== High School ===
In May 2019, as a Reno High School sophomore, Hobson won both the 200-yard freestyle in a state record time of 1:38.53, and the 500-yard freestyle in 4:28.35 at the Nevada State Championship swim meet at the Carson Aquatic Center in Carson City. Hobson said he wanted to set a goal to continue to win the two events as a Junior and Senior. Continuing to achieve as a High School Senior, he swam a 45.22 in the 100 freestyle on May 22, 2021, which qualified him to compete at the "2020 U.S. Olympic Trials", which were held in June, 2021 due to COVID. In the Spring of 2020, when many pools were shut down due to COVID, Hobson trained by lifting weights and swimming in his parents' backyard pool while tethered to a pole.

=== 2023 ===
In March 2023, in his sophomore year, Hobson competed at the NCAA Division I Championships in Minneapolis, representing the Texas Longhorns. He swam the first leg of the 800 yd freestyle relay, splitting 1:29.63 to achieve a personal best in the 200 yd freestyle. Texas won the title in a time of 6:03.42, breaking the U.S. Open and American records in the relay. He then swam in the 500 yd freestyle, winning the title in a time of 4:07.37. His next event was the 200 yd freestyle, which he won in a time of 1:30.43.

In July 2023, Hobson competed at the World Championships in Fukuoka. His first event was the 200 m freestyle. In the semifinals, he did a personal best time of 1:44.87 to qualify second-fastest for the final. In the final, he finished fifth in a time of 1:45.09. He then swam in the 4 × 200 m freestyle relay, splitting 1:46.00 on the first leg. The US won the silver medal in an overall time of 7:00.02.

=== 2024 ===
Hobson competed at the 2024 NCAA Division I Championships in Indianapolis. His first event was the 800 yd freestyle relay, in which he swam the first leg. He split 1:29.13 to break the 200 yd freestyle U.S. Open and American record of 1:29.15, set by Harvard's Dean Farris in 2019. In the subsequent heat, however, Hobson's U.S. Open record was broken by Arizona State's Léon Marchand, who went 1:28.97. Texas finished third in an overall time of 6:05.33. Hobson then swam in the 500 yd freestyle, finishing second in a time of 4:06.93. In the 200 yd freestyle, he won the title in a time of 1:28.81, reclaiming the U.S. Open record in the event.

In July 2024, Hobson competed at the 2024 Olympics in Paris. He won the bronze medal in the 200 m freestyle in a personal best time of 1:44.79, becoming the first swimmer from the University of Texas to win an Olympic medal in the event. He then competed in the 4 × 200 m freestyle relay, splitting 1:45.55 on the first leg; the US won the silver medal in an overall time of 7:00.78.

In December 2024, Hobson competed at the World Championships (25 m) in Budapest. His first event was the 4 × 100 m freestyle relay, in which he split 45.18 on the second leg; the US won the gold medal in a time of 3:01.66, breaking the world record of 3:02.75 set by Italy in 2022. Hobson then competed in the 4 × 200 m freestyle relay. He split 1:38.91 on the first leg, breaking the 200 m freestyle world record of 1:39.37 set by Germany's Paul Biedermann in 2009. The US won the gold medal in a final time of 6:40.51, breaking the nation's own relay world record of 6:44.12 from 2022. Hobson's final event was the 200 m freestyle, in which he won the gold medal, recording a time of 1:38.61 to break the world record again.

=== 2025 ===
In March 2025, Hobson competed at the 2025 NCAA Division I Championships in Federal Way, Washington. He swam in the 800 yd freestyle relay, which was a close race between Texas and California. Hobson split 1:28.90 on the first leg to give Texas an early lead; Texas finished second in an American record time of 6:00.08, 0.33 behind California. Hobson then won the 200 yd freestyle in a U.S. Open and American record time of 1:28.33. At the conclusion of the championships, Texas won the team title.

In June 2025, Hobson competed at the US National Championships in Indianapolis. In the 200 m freestyle preliminaries, he went a personal best time of 1:44.78. In the final, he did another personal best, recording a time of 1:43.73 to break the U.S. Open record of 1:44.10 set by Michael Phelps in 2008.

In July–August 2025, Hobson competed at the World Championships in Singapore. His first event was the 200 m freestyle, in which he won the silver medal in a time of 1:43.84. He then swam the third leg of the 4 × 200 m freestyle relay. He started his leg in sixth place, splitting 1:43.45 to move the US into first place at the 600 m mark; the US eventually finished fourth in a time of 7:01.24, 0.26 behind the bronze medalist.
