= 2026 Australian Short Course Swimming Championships =

- Host city: Sydney, New South Wales
- Date: 29 September – 2 October
- Venue: Sydney Olympic Park Aquatic Centre
- Teams: 186 clubs
- Athletes: 801
- Events: 71 (men: 34; women: 34; mixed: 3)

The 2026 Australian Short Course Swimming Championships were held from 29 September to 2 October 2026 at the Sydney Olympic Park Aquatic Centre in Sydney, New South Wales. The event served as the official selection meet for the Australian team competing at the 2026 World Short Course Swimming Championships in Beijing, China. It had been announced in July 2025 that the Sydney venue would host both this meet and the 2026 Australian Swimming Trials, which took place earlier that year from 8 to 13 June. A total of 801 swimmers representing 186 clubs from across the nation competed over the four days of competition.

Notable absences from the championships included Kaylee McKeown, who withdrew from both the Commonwealth Games and Pan Pacific Swimming Championships due to glandular fever, and Mollie O'Callaghan, who sat out following a back injury. Kyle Chalmers also skipped the event to prioritise time with his young family. Meanwhile, Olympic champion Cameron McEvoy opted out of the meet to compete on the Swimming World Cup circuit. During the Baku leg, McEvoy set a new Australian, Oceanian and World Cup record in the 50 metre freestyle, clocking a time of 20.22 seconds—a mark he lowered further to 20.13 seconds just a week later in Tashkent.

The meet was highlighted by numerous record-breaking performances across both able-bodied and multi-class disciplines. In the able-bodied individual events, Lani Pallister dominated the women's freestyle fields, winning gold in the 200, 400, 800, and 1500 metre events, alongside a silver-medal finish in the 100 metre freestyle. Her performances in the 400, 800, and 1500 metre events established new allcomers records. Samuel Short secured a golden treble in the men's distance events, winning the 400, 800, and 1500 metre freestyle, while Iona Anderson completed a clean sweep of the women's backstroke events. In the men's freestyle sprint disciplines, Edward Sommerville claimed gold in the 200 metre freestyle in an Australian record time and secured a silver medal in the 100 metre freestyle behind event champion Flynn Southam. Joshua Collett achieved a multi-event victory, winning the 50 and 100 metre breaststroke alongside the 100 metre individual medley, notably establishing a new Australian record in the 100 metre breaststroke. In the women's 400 metre individual medley, Jenna Forrester recorded a time of 4:28.39 to claim gold and lower the long-standing 2009 Australian record set by Ellen Fullerton during the super suit era. In the men's 50 metre butterfly, Ben Armbruster broke Chalmers' national and Oceanian records by registering a time of 22.00 in the heats, before lowering the benchmark further to 21.90 in the final.

The multi-class program produced similarly historic results. Rowan Crothers won four gold medals across the 50, 100, and 200 metre freestyle and the 50 metre butterfly. During these events, he established a new S10 world record in the 200 metre freestyle and equalled his own Australian record in the 50 metre freestyle. Beau Matthews claimed victory in the 50 and 100 metre breaststroke, setting new SB9 Australian records in both disciplines, before also winning the 100 metre butterfly. Madeleine McTernan secured four gold medals across the 50, 100, and 200 metre freestyle and the 100 metre backstroke, establishing new S14 national records in the 100 and 200 metre freestyle events. Finally, Amelie Springett-Kelly won the 50 and 100 metre breaststroke double, while Sarah Howe triumphed in the 50 and 100 metre butterfly. Howe also set a new SM10 Australian record in the 100 metre individual medley, finishing with the silver medal behind SM14 swimmer Vanessa Ozols.

To assist with athlete welfare, dogs from Guide Dogs NSW/ACT were present on the pool deck to help reduce anxiety and calm competitors' nerves. The initiative was introduced by Swimming Australia's national wellbeing and engagement manager, Linley Frame, alongside organisational ambassador Shayna Jack. This program followed a similar framework utilised at the 2024 United States Olympic gymnastics trials in Minneapolis, and the dogs had previously been well received by competitors at both the 2026 Australian Open and the 2026 Australian Swimming Trials.

The event concluded with the official announcement of the Australian squad selected for the World Short Course Swimming Championships in Beijing. The final team consisted of 24 swimmers, which included six rookies making their senior international debut.

== Schedule ==
The four-day event was held in a 10-lane pool, with all lanes utilised for both the morning heats and evening finals. No semi-finals were conducted. In the 50, 100, and 200 metre events—which ran heats from fastest to slowest—the top 10 qualifiers advanced to the A Final. B Finals were only conducted if 24 or more swimmers completed the heats and achieved the entry qualifying time, a rule applying to both able-bodied and multi-class events. Similarly, a C Final was held exclusively for able-bodied events, provided that 36 or more swimmers finished the heats and achieved the entry qualifying time. All individual finals sessions were swum sequentially in an A-B-C order.

Conversely, the 400, 800, and 1500 metre freestyle and the 400 metre individual medley events were run as timed finals; their slower heats took place in the morning, while the fastest heat was contested in the evening. Relays were also timed finals, swum from fastest to slowest heat during the evening sessions, with the sole exception of the 4 × 200 metre freestyle relays, which ran during the Day 3 morning session. Multi-class events followed a standard heats-and-finals format, regardless of the number of competitors in the heats. Additionally, the mixed 4 × 50 metre freestyle multi-class relay was contested as a state relay event, capped at a maximum of two teams per state, with each team consisting of two males and two females.

As this was a selection event, strict visitor restrictions applied. For able-bodied events, visitors were barred from the A Final and capped at two in the B Final, with no restrictions in the C Final. Multi-class events capped visitors at two in the A Final but allowed an unlimited number to progress to the B Final. Minimum age eligibility, determined by the swimmer's age on 29 September 2026, was 13 years for able-bodied events and 12 years for multi-class events.

Legend
Key	H	½	F	TF
Value	Heats	Semifinals	Final	Timed final

|M = Morning session (starting at 10:00), E = Evening session (starting at 18:00)

Men
Date →	29 Sep		30 Sep		1 Oct		2 Oct	
Event ↓	M	E	M	E	M	E	M	E
50 m freestyle							H	F
100 m freestyle			H	F				
200 m freestyle	H	F						
400 m freestyle					TF	TF		
800 m freestyle	TF	TF						
1500 m freestyle							TF	TF
50 m backstroke					H	F		
100 m backstroke	H	F						
200 m backstroke			H	F				
50 m breaststroke			H	F				
100 m breaststroke	H	F						
200 m breaststroke							H	F
50 m butterfly	H	F						
100 m butterfly					H	F		
200 m butterfly							H	F
100 m individual medley							H	F
200 m individual medley					H	F		
400 m individual medley			TF	TF				
4 × 100 metre freestyle relay						TF		
4 × 200 metre freestyle relay					TF			
4 × 100 metre medley relay								TF

Men Multi-Class
Date →	29 Sep		30 Sep		1 Oct		2 Oct	
Event ↓	M	E	M	E	M	E	M	E
50 m freestyle			H	F				
100 m freestyle					H	F		
200 m freestyle	H	F						
400 m freestyle	H	F						
50 m backstroke							H	F
100 m backstroke			H	F				
50 m breaststroke			H	F				
100 m breaststroke							H	F
50 m butterfly	H	F						
100 m butterfly							H	F
100 m individual medley			H	F				
150 m individual medley					H	F		
200 m individual medley					H	F		

Mixed
Date →	29 Sep		30 Sep		1 Oct		2 Oct	
Event ↓	M	E	M	E	M	E	M	E
4 × 50 m freestyle relay				TF				
4 × 50 m medley relay		TF						

Women
Date →	29 Sep		30 Sep		1 Oct		2 Oct	
Event ↓	M	E	M	E	M	E	M	E
50 m freestyle							H	F
100 m freestyle			H	F				
200 m freestyle	H	F						
400 m freestyle					TF	TF		
800 m freestyle							TF	TF
1500 m freestyle	TF	TF						
50 m backstroke					H	F		
100 m backstroke	H	F						
200 m backstroke			H	F				
50 m breaststroke			H	F				
100 m breaststroke	H	F						
200 m breaststroke							H	F
50 m butterfly	H	F						
100 m butterfly					H	F		
200 m butterfly							H	F
100 m individual medley							H	F
200 m individual medley					H	F		
400 m individual medley			TF	TF				
4 × 100 metre freestyle relay						TF		
4 × 200 metre freestyle relay					TF			
4 × 100 metre medley relay								TF

Women's Multi-Class
Date →	29 Sep		30 Sep		1 Oct		2 Oct	
Event ↓	M	E	M	E	M	E	M	E
50 m freestyle			H	F				
100 m freestyle					H	F		
200 m freestyle	H	F						
400 m freestyle	H	F						
50 m backstroke							H	F
100 m backstroke			H	F				
50 m breaststroke			H	F				
100 m breaststroke							H	F
50 m butterfly	H	F						
100 m butterfly							H	F
100 m individual medley			H	F				
150 m individual medley					H	F		
200 m individual medley					H	F		

Mixed Multi-Class
Date →	29 Sep		30 Sep		1 Oct		2 Oct	
Event ↓	M	E	M	E	M	E	M	E
4 × 50 m freestyle relay				TF				

== Qualification criteria ==
Priority 1 selection required athletes to finish first or second in the individual event's A Final while equalling or bettering the qualifying time established by Swimming Australia. These target standards were explicitly set to match the time recorded by the last-place finalist in each respective event at the 2024 World Short Course Swimming Championships.

Swimming Australia qualification times for 2026 World Short Course Swimming Championships
Event	Men	Women
50 metre freestyle	20.80	23.76
100 metre freestyle	46.09	52.31
200 metre freestyle	1:42.84	1:54.29
400 metre freestyle	3:39.14	4:02.03
800 metre freestyle	7:35.92	8:18.85
1500 metre freestyle	14:32.10	15:49.09
50 metre backstroke	22.89	26.25
100 metre backstroke	50.03	56.17
200 metre backstroke	1:51.28	2:04.62
50 metre breaststroke	25.81	29.68
100 metre breaststroke	56.60	1:04.15
200 metre breaststroke	2:04.15	2:19.59
50 metre butterfly	22.09	25.13
100 metre butterfly	49.29	56.12
200 metre butterfly	1:51.79	2:05.53
100 metre individual medley	52.20	58.47
200 metre individual medley	1:53.55	2:07.17
400 metre individual medley	4:04.24	4:32.20

== Results ==
The medallist for all events are below.

=== Men's events ===
Event	Gold		Silver		Bronze	
50 metre freestyle	Isaac Cooper; St Andrew's (Qld)	20.68 ACR, Q	Flynn Southam; Bond (Qld)	20.95	Ollie Moclair; SOPAC (NSW)	21.08
100 metre freestyle	Flynn Southam; Bond (Qld)	45.61 Q	Edward Sommerville; Brisbane Grammar (Qld)	46.06 Q	Marcus Da Silva; Cranbrook (NSW)	46.55
200 metre freestyle	Edward Sommerville; Brisbane Grammar (Qld)	1:40.16 OC, AR, ACR, Q	Marcus Da Silva; Cranbrook (NSW)	1:41.91 Q	Maximillian Giuliani; Miami (Qld)	1:42.02
400 metre freestyle	Samuel Short; Rackley (Qld)	3:35.16 Q	Elijah Winnington; Somerville House (Qld)	3:39.24	Tex Cross; Highlanders (WA)	3:41.53
800 metre freestyle	Samuel Short; Rackley (Qld)	7:25.55 Q	Tex Cross; Highlanders (WA)	7:38.45	Alec Mander; Southside Penrhos Wesley (WA)	7:38.76
1500 metre freestyle	Samuel Short; Rackley (Qld)	14:15.10 Q	Tex Cross; Highlanders (WA)	14:42.17	Alec Mander; Southside Penrhos Wesley (WA)	15:03.36
50 metre backstroke	Isaac Cooper; St Andrew's (Qld)	22.53 Q	Mark Nikolaev; Somerset (Qld)	22.96	Stuart Swinburn; City of Sydney (NSW)	24.01
100 metre backstroke	Mark Nikolaev; Somerset (Qld)	49.79 Q	Isaac Cooper; St Andrew's (Qld)	50.25	Enoch Robb; Griffith University (Qld)	51.09
200 metre backstroke	Stuart Swinburn; City of Sydney (NSW)	1:50.81 Q	Enoch Robb; Griffith University (Qld)	1:51.65	Joshua Edwards-Smith; Griffith University (Qld)	1:52.21
50 metre breaststroke	Joshua Collett; Bond (Qld)	26.09	Gideon Burnes; Bond (Qld)	26.11	James McKechnie; Starplex (SA)	26.49
100 metre breaststroke	Joshua Collett; Bond (Qld)	56.61 OC, AR, ACR	Joshua Yong; Highlanders (WA)	56.72	Gideon Burnes; Bond (Qld)	56.94
200 metre breaststroke	Joshua Yong; Highlanders (WA)	2:03.13 Q	Joshua Collett; Bond (Qld)	2:04.36	Joshua Anderson; Brisbane Grammar (Qld)	2:07.13
50 metre butterfly	Ben Armbruster; Bond (Qld)	21.90 OC, AR, ACR, Q	Jesse Coleman; Bond (Qld)	22.22	James Ward; Caulfield (Vic)	23.21
100 metre butterfly	Matthew Temple; Marion (SA)	49.71	Jesse Coleman; Bond (Qld)	49.89	Ben Armbruster; Bond (Qld)	50.00
200 metre butterfly	Alex Quach; Nudgee College (Qld)	1:51.65 Q	William Jordan; Brisbane Grammar (Qld)	1:53.85	Dylan Zhou; Knox Pymble (NSW)	1:55.27
100 metre individual medley	Joshua Collett; Bond (Qld)	52.73	Lukas Dunn; Knox Pymble (NSW)	52.79	Callum Halloran-Lavelle; Nunawading (Vic)	53.35
200 metre individual medley	David Schlicht; MLC Aquatic A (Vic)	1:53.45 Q	William Petric; Nunawading (Vic)	1:53.53 Q	Lukas Dunn; Knox Pymble (NSW)	1:54.73
400 metre individual medley	William Petric; Nunawading (Vic)	3:59.27 Q	Samuel Higgs; Nunawading (Vic)	4:06.70	Cameron Ricchini; Miami (Qld)	4:09.66
4 × 100 metre freestyle relay	Knox Pymble A (NSW); Tristen Waugh (48.02); Ethan Haegebaert (48.34); Lukas Dunn (47.86); Joseph Hamson (47.57)	3:11.79	Cranbrook A (NSW); Tate Sirianni (48.10); Jacob Whitton (48.79); Lewis Kreutzberger (48.78); Marcus Da Silva (46.38)	3:12.05 Club	Highlanders A (WA); Daniel Boshart (48.66); Flynn Carroll (48.24); Jackson Anderson (48.24); Tex Cross (48.89)	3:14.03
4 × 200 metre freestyle relay	Cranbrook A (NSW); Tate Sirianni (1:48.19); Lewis Kreutzberger (1:50.80); Jackson McCleery (1:50.08); Marcus Da Silva (1:42.64)	7:11.71	Sydney University A (NSW); Kalani Creech (1:46.57); Alexander Clarence (1:49.53); Matthew Costelloe (1:49.98); Kirana Agung Anom (1:50.06)	7:16.14	Knox Pymble A (NSW); Tristen Waugh (1:48.11); Dylan Zhou (1:48.01); Cooper Portlock (1:52.87); Adam Dunn (1:53.73)	7:22.72
4 × 100 metre medley relay	Knox Pymble A (NSW); Ethan Haegebaert (53.79); Lukas Dunn (58.59); Joseph Hamson (50.33); Tristen Waugh (47.55)	3:30.26	Highlanders A (WA); Thomas Prowton (54.07); Joshua Yong (57.49); Daniel Boshart (51.33); Flynn Carroll (47.90)	3:30.79	Manly A (NSW); Callyn Fenwick-Kearns (53.38); Bailey Crehan (59.84); Harrison Rothwell (53.80); Gabriel Gorgas (48.51)	3:35.53
WR World record | CR Commonwealth record | OC Oceanian record | AR Australian record | ACR Australian Allcomers record | Club Australian Club record

=== Men's multi-class events ===
Event	Gold		Silver		Bronze	
50 metre freestyle	Rowan Crothers (S10); Marion (SA)	23.04 =AR (924)	Alexander Tuckfield (S10); AquaBlitz Toongabbie (NSW)	23.52 (868)	Hamish Keenan (S9); Propulsion (Vic)	26.48 (771)
100 metre freestyle	Rowan Crothers (S10); Marion (SA)	49.97 (926)	Alexander Tuckfield (S10); AquaBlitz Toongabbie (NSW)	51.66 (838)	Joshua Alford (S14); University of Queensland (Qld)	56.39 (745)
200 metre freestyle	Rowan Crothers (S10); Marion (SA)	1:49.93 WR (1081)	Alexander Tuckfield (S10); AquaBlitz Toongabbie (NSW)	1:50.79 (1056)	Beau Matthews (S10); AquaBlitz Toongabbie (NSW)	1:56.44 (910)
400 metre freestyle	Joshua Alford (S14); University of Queensland (Qld)	4:19.34 (818)	Daniel Rigby (S9); Knox Pymble (NSW)	4:29.94 (759)	Lockie Bellion (S14); Traralgon (Vic)	4:33.70 (696)
50 metre backstroke	Jesse Aungles (S8); Cruiz (ACT)	31.89 AR (890)	James Logan (S15); Geelong Sharks (Vic)	30.31 (584)	Joshua Alford (S14); University of Queensland (Qld)	30.48 (554)
100 metre backstroke	Jesse Aungles (S8); Cruiz (ACT)	1:07.47 (821)	Samuel Gould (S14); Griffith University (Qld)	1:00.98 (813)	Ethan Blockey (S14); Coffs Harbour (NSW)	1:01.78 (782)
50 metre breaststroke	Beau Matthews (SB9); AquaBlitz Toongabbie (NSW)	30.41 AR (875)	Riley Moore (SB9); Woden Valley (ACT)	30.74 (847)	Thomas Voigt (SB14); Grace (Qld)	33.22 (717)
100 metre breaststroke	Beau Matthews (SB9); AquaBlitz Toongabbie (NSW)	1:05.39 AR (920)	Samuel Gould (SB14); Griffith University (Qld)	1:08.81 (706)	Declan Carriage (SB9); Dapto (NSW)	1:12.66 (670)
50 metre butterfly	Rowan Crothers (S10); Marion (SA)	26.86 (756)	Riley Su (S14); Friends (Tas)	27.31 (713)	Joshua Alford (S14); University of Queensland (Qld)	28.00 (662)
100 metre butterfly	Beau Matthews (S10); AquaBlitz Toongabbie (NSW)	57.93 (823)	Jesse Aungles (S8); Cruiz (ACT)	1:06.04 (747)	Samuel Gould (S14); Griffith University (Qld)	59.33 (742)
100 metre individual medley	Riley Su (SM14); Friends (Tas)	1:04.66 (711)	Thomas Voigt (SM14); Grace (Qld)	1:08.20 (606)	James Logan (SM15); Geelong Sharks (Vic)	1:07.18 (580)
150 metre individual medley	Not contested					
200 metre individual medley	Samuel Gould (SM14); Griffith University (Qld)	2:11.90 (946)	Ethan Blockey (SM14); Coffs Harbour (NSW)	2:15.52 (872)	Beau Matthews (SM10); AquaBlitz Toongabbie (NSW)	2:09.89 AR (871)
WR World record | CR Commonwealth record | OC Oceanian record | AR Australian record | ACR Australian Allcomers record | Club Australian Club record

=== Women's events ===
Event	Gold		Silver		Bronze	
50 metre freestyle	Alexandria Perkins; USC Spartans (Qld)	23.45 Q	Olivia Wunsch; Carlile (NSW)	24.05	Chloe Rowe-Hagans; St Andrew's (Qld)	24.58
100 metre freestyle	Olivia Wunsch; Carlile (NSW)	51.72 Q	Lani Pallister; St Peters Western (Qld)	53.18	Jaimie de Lutiis; Carlile (NSW)	53.46
200 metre freestyle	Lani Pallister; St Peters Western (Qld)	1:51.99 Q	Brittany Castelluzzo; Tea Tree Gully (SA)	1:53.07 Q	Jenna Forrester; St Peters Western (Qld)	1:54.63
400 metre freestyle	Lani Pallister; St Peters Western (Qld)	3:54.55 ACR, Q	Jenna Forrester; St Peters Western (Qld)	4:02.68	Jade Starr; Griffith University (Qld)	4:07.78
800 metre freestyle	Lani Pallister; St Peters Western (Qld)	8:01.66 ACR, Q	Jenna Forrester; St Peters Western (Qld)	8:16.81 Q	Molly Young; Carlile (NSW)	8:35.25
1500 metre freestyle	Lani Pallister; St Peters Western (Qld)	15:18.68 ACR, Q	Clementine Saunders; Randwick City (NSW)	16:37.01	Lucy Doyle; Nunawading (Vic)	16:46.89
50 metre backstroke	Iona Anderson; Highlanders (WA)	25.88 Q	Mackenzie Burns; St Andrew's (Qld)	26.29	Emily Jones; Hunter (NSW)	26.32
100 metre backstroke	Iona Anderson; Highlanders (WA)	55.57 Q	Emily Jones; Hunter (NSW)	56.88	Alyssa Burgess; Highlanders (WA)	57.52
200 metre backstroke	Iona Anderson; Highlanders (WA)	2:03.00 Q	Jenna Forrester; St Peters Western (Qld)	2:04.17 Q	Alyssa Burgess; Highlanders (WA)	2:04.41
50 metre breaststroke	Mia O'Leary; Griffith University (Qld)	29.72	Lily Koch; Melbourne Vicentre (Vic)	30.32	Kyla Brown; Bond (Qld)	30.66
100 metre breaststroke	Tara Kinder; Melbourne Vicentre (Vic); Amelie Smith; Rocky City (Qld)	1:06.12	None awarded		Ava Rollason; Cruiz (ACT)	1:06.27
200 metre breaststroke	Tara Kinder; Melbourne Vicentre (Vic)	2:18.89 Q	Amelie Smith; Rocky City (Qld)	2:21.26	Julia Eve Spedding; Griffith University (Qld)	2:22.93
50 metre butterfly	Alexandria Perkins; USC Spartans (Qld)	24.78 Q	Mackenzie Burns; St Andrew's (Qld)	25.45	Claudia Fydler; Bond (Qld)	25.58
100 metre butterfly	Brittany Castelluzzo; Tea Tree Gully (SA)	56.00 Q	Claudia Fydler; Bond (Qld)	56.94	Olivia Wunsch; Carlile (NSW)	56.98
200 metre butterfly	Brittany Castelluzzo; Tea Tree Gully (SA)	2:04.52 Q	Poppy Stephen; Brisbane Grammar (Qld)	2:05.62	Jess Cole; Carlile (NSW)	2:09.64
100 metre individual medley	Iona Anderson; Highlanders (WA)	59.51	Lexi Harrison; Manly (NSW)	59.70	Isabella Boyd; Nunawading (Vic)	59.77
200 metre individual medley	Tara Kinder; Melbourne Vicentre (Vic)	2:05.48 Q	Jenna Forrester; St Peters Western (Qld)	2:07.62	Amalie Smith; Rocky City (Qld)	2:08.76
400 metre individual medley	Jenna Forrester; St Peters Western (Qld)	4:28.39 OC, AR, ACR, Q	Amalie Smith; Rocky City (Qld)	4:30.87 Q	Kayla Hardy; Cruiz (ACT)	4:32.79
4 × 100 metre freestyle relay	Carlile A (NSW); Olivia Wunsch (52.34); Jess Cole (55.91); Zannah Dixon (56.23); Jaimie de Lutiis (52.94)	3:37.42	Manly A (NSW); Sarah Locke (55.21); Lexi Harrison (54.91); Alexi Furlong (56.64); Lillie McPherson (54.61)	3:41.37	Nunawading A (Vic); Aleisha Clark (55.36); Alannah Torrance (55.88); Lucy Doyle (57.76); Weylen Truong (57.71)	3:46.71
4 × 200 metre freestyle relay	Randwick City A (NSW); Gemma Munro (2:06.25); Clementine Saunders (2:04.38); Isabella Gibbons (2:05.98); Eve Blacklock (2:08.81)	8:25.42	MLC Aquatic A (Vic); Ciara Jeffs (2:01.44); Mariella Simmons (2:08.44); Zoe Cleminson (2:09.32); Jemima Hale (2:08.41)	8:27.61	Warringah A (NSW); Amelie Swann (2:06.85); Pippa McCullough (2:12.16); Matilda Young (2:06.57); Mia Reynolds (2:09.38)	8:34.96
4 × 100 metre medley relay	Carlile A (NSW); Charlotte Lim (1:01.80); Jaimie de Lutiis (1:07.73); Jess Cole (58.83); Olivia Wunsch (51.96)	4:00.32	Manly A (NSW); Sarah Locke (1:02.96); Lexi Harrison (1:08.39); Lillie McPherson (59.46); Alexi Furlong (56.73)	4:07.54	Nunawading A (Vic); Madison Brown (1:04.55); Alannah Torrance (1:09.18); Courtney Mudge (1:02.15); Aleisha Clark (55.22)	4:11.10
WR World record | CR Commonwealth record | OC Oceanian record | AR Australian record | ACR Australian Allcomers record | Club Australian Club record

=== Women's multi-class events ===
Event	Gold		Silver		Bronze	
50 metre freestyle	Madeleine McTernan (S14); Griffith University (Qld)	27.83 (970)	Victoria Belando Nicholson (S9); University of Queensland (Qld)	29.45 (878)	Sarah Howe (S10); St Hilda's (Qld)	30.04 (744)
100 metre freestyle	Madeleine McTernan (S14); Griffith University (Qld)	58.95 AR (946)	Victoria Belando Nicholson (S9); University of Queensland (Qld)	1:03.67 (921)	Sarah Howe (S10); St Hilda's (Qld)	1:04.22 (792)
200 metre freestyle	Madeleine McTernan (S14); Griffith University (Qld)	2:07.68 AR (910)	Aaliyah Currie (S6); Mingara (NSW)	2:59.98 AR (702)	Sienna Compton (S15); NUSwim (NSW)	2:26.42 (601)
400 metre freestyle	Victoria Belando Nicholson (S9); University of Queensland (Qld)	4:54.10 (844)	Emilee Pratt (S9); Hunter (NSW)	5:13.69 (696)	Emmeline Giraud (S10); DRLC Maroubra (NSW)	5:02.00 (689)
50 metre backstroke	Gemma Sellick (S9); Warringah (NSW)	33.90 (868)	Ikuha Zenno (S15); Japan	31.36 (756)	Caitlyn Hayes (S8); Helensvale (Qld)	40.44 (699)
100 metre backstroke	Madeleine McTernan (S14); Griffith University (Qld)	1:06.63 (958)	Gemma Sellick (S9); Warringah (NSW)	1:11.97 (820)	Ikuha Zenno (S15); Japan	1:06.48 (807)
50 metre breaststroke	Amelie Springett-Kelly (SB6); AquaBlitz Toongabbie (NSW)	47.92 (776)	Gemma Sellick (SB8); Warringah (NSW)	40.22 (720)	Alyssa Gillespie (SB8); Knox Pymble (NSW)	41.31 (665)
100 metre breaststroke	Amelie Springett-Kelly (SB6); AquaBlitz Toongabbie (NSW)	1:43.90 (762)	Ikuha Zenno (SB15); Japan	1:18.12 (731)	Gemma Sellick (SB8); Warringah (NSW)	1:29.46 (602)
50 metre butterfly	Sarah Howe (S10); St Hilda's (Qld)	32.17 (689)	Amelie Springett-Kelly (S6); AquaBlitz Toongabbie (NSW)	41.95 (655)	Gemma Sellick (S9); Warringah (NSW)	33.10 (652)
100 metre butterfly	Sarah Howe (S10); St Hilda's (Qld)	1:10.77 (710)	Sienna Compton (S15); NUSwim (NSW)	1:18.45 (528)	Iesha Apthorpe (S19); Port Macquarie (NSW)	1:02.88 AR (505)
100 metre individual medley	Vanessa Ozols (SM14); AquaBlitz Toongabbie (NSW)	1:21.97 (661)	Sarah Howe (SM10); St Hilda's (Qld)	1:15.17 AR (647)	Sienna Compton (SM15); NUSwim (NSW)	1:16.06 (566)
150 metre individual medley	Not contested					
200 metre individual medley	Ikuha Zenno (SM15); Japan	2:25.64 (873)	Gemma Sellick (SM9); Warringah (NSW)	2:46.15 (714)	Sienna Compton (SM15); NUSwim (NSW)	2:45.27 (598)
WR World record | CR Commonwealth record | OC Oceanian record | AR Australian record | ACR Australian Allcomers record | Club Australian Club record

=== Mixed events ===
Event	Gold		Silver		Bronze	
4 × 50 metre freestyle relay	Sydney University A (NSW); William Yang (21.99); Caleb Yago (22.07); Elizabeth Gan (24.82); Asha Ring (25.27)	1:34.15 Club	Manly A (NSW); Callyn Fenwick-Kearns (22.25); Kyan Winn (22.60); Sarah Locke (25.01); Lillie McPherson (24.59)	1:34.45	Knox Pymble A (NSW); Ethan Haegebaert (21.77); Hudson Hegarty (22.34); Megan Chia (26.08); Leena Cho (26.43)	1:36.62
4 × 50 metre medley relay	Highlanders A (WA); Iona Anderson (25.77); Joshua Yong (26.04); Daniel Boshart (23.26); Alyssa Burgess (24.50)	1:39.57 Club	Manly A (NSW); Callyn Fenwick-Kearns (24.78); Bailey Crehan (27.28); Lillie McPherson (26.52); Sarah Locke (25.66)	1:44.24	Sydney University A (NSW); Elizabeth Gan (27.90); Lucas Smith (27.63); Caleb Yago (23.28); Asha Ring (26.06)	1:44.87
WR World record | CR Commonwealth record | OC Oceanian record | AR Australian record | ACR Australian Allcomers record | Club Australian Club record

=== Mixed multi-class events ===
Event	Gold		Silver		Bronze	
4 × 50 metre freestyle relay	NSW A Alexander Tuckfield (S10) (24.27); Beau Matthews (S10) (25.25); Iesha Apthorpe (S19) (26.76); Emmeline Giraud (S10) (29.87)	1:46.15	NSW B Charles Jorgensen (S19) (25.80); Sienna Compton (S15) (30.45); Bryony Rudd (S19) (29.26); Lachlan Lau (S14) (27.05)	1:52.56	Vic A Hamish Keenan (S9) (27.17); Lockie Bellion (S14) (27.77); Mackenzie Gibbs (S10) (31.43); Grace Rider (S19) (29.99)	1:56.36
WR World record | CR Commonwealth record | OC Oceanian record | AR Australian record | ACR Australian Allcomers record | Club Australian Club record

Highlighted swimmers achieved the qualification time to be included in the team in the respective event.

== Records broken ==
During the 2026 Australian Short Course Swimming Championships the following records were set.

=== World records ===
- Men's 200 metre freestyle S10 – Rowan Crothers, Marion (SA) (1:49.93) (final)

=== Oceanian and Australian records ===
- Men's 200 metre freestyle – Edward Sommerville, Brisbane Grammar (Qld) (1:40.16) (final)
- Men's 100 metre breaststroke – Joshua Collett, Bond (Qld) (56.61) (final)
- Men's 50 metre butterfly – Ben Armbruster, Bond (Qld) (22.00) (heats)
- Men's 50 metre butterfly – Ben Armbruster, Bond (Qld) (21.90) (final)
- Women's 400 metre individual medley – Jenna Forrester, St Peters Western (Qld) (4:28.39) (final)
- Men's 50 metre freestyle S10 – Rowan Crothers, Marion (SA) (23.04) (final) (Note: Crothers equalled is own men's 50 metre freestyle S10 Australian record of 23.04 which he swum at the 2020 Australian Short Course Swimming Championships.)
- Men's 50 metre freestyle S19 – Jake Hodgkinson, Tea Tree Gully (SA) (24.61) (heats)
- Men's 50 metre backstroke S8 – Jesse Aungles, Cruiz (ACT) (32.43) (heats)
- Men's 50 metre backstroke S8 – Jesse Aungles, Cruiz (ACT) (31.89) (final)
- Men's 50 metre breaststroke SB9 – Beau Matthews, AquaBlitz Toongabbie (NSW) (30.41) (final)
- Men's 100 metre breaststroke SB9 – Beau Matthews, AquaBlitz Toongabbie (NSW) (1:05.39) (final)
- Men's 200 metre individual medley SM10 – Beau Matthews, AquaBlitz Toongabbie (NSW) (2:09.89) (final)
- Women's 100 metre freestyle S14 – Madeleine McTernan, Griffith University (Qld) (58.95) (final)
- Women's 200 metre freestyle S14 – Madeleine McTernan, Griffith University (Qld) (2:08.30) (heats)
- Women's 200 metre freestyle S14 – Madeleine McTernan, Griffith University (Qld) (2:07.68) (final)
- Women's 200 metre freestyle S6 – Aaliyah Currie, Mingara (NSW) (2:59.98) (final)
- Women's 100 metre butterfly S19 – Iesha Apthorpe, Port Macquarie (NSW) (1:03.49) (heats) (Note: Broke her own previous record of 1:03.65 in the heats before breaking it again the final.)
- Women's 100 metre butterfly S19 – Iesha Apthorpe, Port Macquarie (NSW) (1:02.88) (final)
- Women's 100 metre individual medley SM10 – Sarah Howe, St Hilda's (Qld) (1:17.16) (heats) (Note: Broke her own previous record of 1:17.61 in the heats before breaking it again the final.)
- Women's 100 metre individual medley SM10 – Sarah Howe, St Hilda's (Qld) (1:15.17) (final)

=== Allcomers records ===
- Men's 50 metre freestyle – Isaac Cooper, St Andrew's (Qld) (20.72) (heats)
- Men's 50 metre freestyle – Isaac Cooper, St Andrew's (Qld) (20.68) (final)
- Men's 200 metre freestyle – Edward Sommerville, Brisbane Grammar (Qld) (1:40.16) (final)
- Men's 100 metre breaststroke – Gideon Burnes, Bond (Qld) (56.75) (heats)
- Men's 100 metre breaststroke – Joshua Collett, Bond (Qld) (56.61) (final)
- Men's 50 metre butterfly – Ben Armbruster, Bond (Qld) (22.00) (heats)
- Men's 50 metre butterfly – Ben Armbruster, Bond (Qld) (21.90) (final)
- Women's 400 metre freestyle – Lani Pallister, St Peters Western (Qld) (3:54.55) (timed final)
- Women's 800 metre freestyle – Lani Pallister, St Peters Western (Qld) (8:01.66) (timed final)
- Women's 1500 metre freestyle – Lani Pallister, St Peters Western (Qld) (15:18.68) (timed final)
- Women's 400 metre individual medley – Jenna Forrester, St Peters Western (Qld) (4:28.39) (final)

=== Australian club ===
- Men's 4 × 100 metre freestyle relay – Tate Sirianni, Jacob Whitton, Lewis Kreutzberger, Marcus Da Silva, Cranbrook A (NSW) (3:12.05) (timed final)
- Mixed 4 × 50 metre freestyle relay – William Yang, Caleb Yago, Elizabeth Gan, Asha Ring, Sydney University A (NSW) (1:34.15) (timed final)
- Mixed 4 × 50 metre medley relay – Iona Anderson, Joshua Yong, Daniel Boshart, Alyssa Burgess, Highlanders A (WA) (1:39.57) (timed final)

== Team announcement ==
On 2 October 2026, at the conclusion of the meet, the Australian team for the 2026 World Short Course Swimming Championships was announced. A squad of 24 swimmers was selected for the event, to be held in Beijing, China, from 1 to 6 December 2026—the maximum team size determined by Swimming Australia. David Schlicht will be competing in his fourth World Short Course Championships alongside fellow event medallists Isaac Cooper, Lani Pallister, Alexandria Perkins, Matthew Temple, Joshua Yong, Brittany Castelluzzo, Maximillian Giuliani, Tara Kinder, Flynn Southam and Stuart Swinburn. Six swimmers will be making their senior debut, including 18-year-old Amelie Smith, the youngest in the squad. At 29, Mark Nikolaev is the squad's oldest member and debutant. A former Russian international who won a silver medal in the men's 4 × 100 metre medley relay at the 2019 Summer Universiade, Nikolaev began the process of changing his sporting citizenship to Australia in 2021. Two of the debutants, Emily Jones and Cameron Bladen, have been selected as relay swimmers alongside Temple and Joshua Collett. Edward Sommerville, who qualified in both the 100 and 200 metre freestyle events, ruled himself out of selection to concentrate on his training base in Brisbane, with Giuliani filling the vacancy. Elijah Winnington, the 2024 World Short Course champion in the men's 400 metre freestyle, failed to make selection.

2026 World Short Course Swimming Championships Team
Name	State	Age (Note: As at the time of the announcement)	Championships	Pin No.
Iona Anderson	WA	20	2nd	854
Ben Armbruster	Qld	24	1st	834
Cameron Bladen	Vic	25	1st	Debut
Brittany Castelluzzo	SA	25	2nd	842
Joshua Collett	Qld	22	2nd	860
Isaac Cooper	Qld	22	3rd	813
Marcus Da Silva	NSW	19	1st	Debut
Jenna Forrester	Qld	23	1st	824
Maximillian Giuliani	Qld	23	2nd	857
Emily Jones	NSW	23	1st	Debut
Tara Kinder	Vic	23	2nd	863
Mark Nikolaev	Qld	29	1st	Debut
Lani Pallister	Qld	24	3rd	830
Alexandria Perkins	Qld	26	3rd	836
William Petric	Vic	22	1st	858
Alex Quach	Qld	25	1st	Debut
David Schlicht	Vic	27	4th	805
Samuel Short	Qld	23	1st	832
Amelie Smith	Qld	18	1st	Debut
Flynn Southam	Qld	21	2nd	839
Stuart Swinburn	NSW	25	2nd	850
Matthew Temple	SA	27	3rd	812
Olivia Wunsch	NSW	20	1st	859
Joshua Yong	WA	25	3rd	841

== Club points scores ==
The final club point scores are below. Note: Only the top ten clubs are listed.

2026 Australian Short Course Swimming Championships club point score
Rank	Club	State	Points
1	Griffith University	Queensland	1,048
2	Bond	Queensland	943
3	Knox Pymble	New South Wales	852
4	Nunawading	Victoria	833
5	AquaBlitz Toongabbie	New South Wales	661
6	Highlanders	Western Australia	623
7	Manly	New South Wales	570
8	Carlile	New South Wales	526
9	St Andrew's	Queensland	506
10	University of Queensland	Queensland	481

== Broadcast ==
In January 2025, it was announced that the Nine Network has secured a ten-year multi-platform media agreement with Swimming Australia through to 2034. Both the morning heat sessions and evening final sessions were streamed live on 9Now. The commentary team consisted of Tony Schibeci, Matt Welsh and Jason Cram with Welsh conducting the poolside interviews.
