= 2026 Australian Open (swimming) =

- Host city: Gold Coast, Queensland
- Date: 6–8 April
- Venue: Gold Coast Aquatic Centre
- Events: 65 (men: 32; women: 32, mixed: 1)

The 2026 Australian Open was held from 6 to 8 April 2026 at the Gold Coast Aquatic Centre in Gold Coast, Queensland. In April 2025, Swimming Australia announced that the Gold Coast would be hosting the Open in 2026, 2028 and 2030 in the lead up to the 2032 Brisbane Summer Olympics.

In July 2025, it was announced that the Australian Open Championships will be renamed the Australian Open and would no longer be the Australian Long Course Championships event for swimmers. Australian champions will now determined at the annual Australian Swimming Trials event for able bodied swimmers. This decision was reflective that the fastest racing of the year occurs at Trials. Australian champions in multi-class events however will be continued to be recognised at the Open as this event caters for the entire multi-class community (S1–S19), and not just the para swimmers (S1–S14) with medals presented for this cohort. The Open will also serve at the Open Club Championships event each year with points score being decided on individual and club relay performances.

During the heats, three dogs from Guide Dogs Queensland were present on pool deck to help address anxiety and calm the nerves of the swimmers. This was an initiative by Linley Frame, Swimming Australia's national wellbeing and engagement manager and Shayna Jack who is an ambassador for the organisation. This was well received by the competitors. It follows on the 2024 United States Olympic gymnastics trials in Minneapolis where a four-year-old golden retriever was present.

== Schedule ==
The event was held over three days in a 10-lane pool with heats in the morning and finals in the evenings. There were no semi finals held with the fastest ten swimmers from the heats advancing to the A Final and the next ten fasting contesting the B Final in the 50 m, 100 m and 200 metre events, provided that 24 swimmers entered in the heats. The A Final was swum before the B Final. The heats for these events were swum in the order of fastest to slowest. The 800 and 1500 metre distance events were timed finals with the slow heats being swum in the morning and the fastest heat being contested in the evening. The relay events were also timed finals with all of them being raced in the evening session, slowest to fastest heat. A maximum of two visitors were permitted to progress to the A Final of the multi-class events and there was no restrictions on the number of visitors who were permitted to advance to the A Final of the able-bodied events and the B Finals of all events.

Legend
Key	H	½	F	TF
Value	Heats	Semifinals	Final	Timed final

M = Morning session (starting at 09:00), E = Evening session (starting at 18:00)

Men
Date →	6 April		7 April		8 April	
Event ↓	M	E	M	E	M	E
50 m freestyle					H	F
100 m freestyle	H	F				
200 m freestyle			H	F		
400 m freestyle	H	F				
800 m freestyle			TF	TF		
1500 m freestyle					TF	TF
50 m backstroke	H	F				
100 m backstroke			H	F		
200 m backstroke					H	F
50 m breaststroke					H	F
100 m breaststroke			H	F		
200 m breaststroke	H	F				
50 m butterfly			H	F		
100 m butterfly					H	F
200 m butterfly	H	F				
200 m individual medley			H	F		
400 m individual medley					H	F
4 × 100 metre freestyle relay						TF
4 × 200 metre freestyle relay				TF		
4 × 100 metre medley relay		TF				

Men Multi-Class
Date →	6 April		7 April		8 April	
Event ↓	M	E	M	E	M	E
50 m freestyle					H	F
100 m freestyle			H	F		
200 m freestyle	H	F				
400 m freestyle	H	F				
50 m backstroke					H	F
100 m backstroke					H	F
50 m breaststroke			H	F		
100 m breaststroke			H	F		
50 m butterfly	H	F				
100 m butterfly			H	F		
150 m individual medley					H	F
200 m individual medley					H	F

Mixed
Date →	6 April		7 April		8 April	
Event ↓	M	E	M	E	M	E
4 × 100 m medley relay				TF		

Women
Date →	6 April		7 April		8 April	
Event ↓	M	E	M	E	M	E
50 m freestyle			H	F		
100 m freestyle	H	F				
200 m freestyle					H	F
400 m freestyle			H	F		
800 m freestyle	TF	TF				
1500 m freestyle					TF	TF
50 m backstroke					H	F
100 m backstroke			H	F		
200 m backstroke	H	F				
50 m breaststroke					H	F
100 m breaststroke	H	F				
200 m breaststroke			H	F		
50 m butterfly	H	F				
100 m butterfly			H	F		
200 m butterfly					H	F
200 m individual medley					H	F
400 m individual medley	H	F				
4 × 100 metre freestyle relay						TF
4 × 200 metre freestyle relay				TF		
4 × 100 metre medley relay		TF				

Women's Multi-Class
Date →	6 April		7 April		8 April	
Event ↓	M	E	M	E	M	E
50 m freestyle					H	F
100 m freestyle			H	F		
200 m freestyle	H	F				
400 m freestyle	H	F				
50 m backstroke					H	F
100 m backstroke					H	F
50 m breaststroke			H	F		
100 m breaststroke			H	F		
50 m butterfly	H	F				
100 m butterfly			H	F		
150 m individual medley					H	F
200 m individual medley					H	F

== Results ==
The medallist for all events are below.

=== Men's events ===
Event	Gold		Silver		Bronze	
50 metre freestyle	Jamie Jack; St Peters Western (Qld)	21.71	Thomas Robinson; Cruiz (ACT)	22.32	Ben Armbruster; Bond (Qld)	22.45
100 metre freestyle	Kyle Chalmers; Marion (SA)	48.39	Flynn Southam; Bond (Qld)	48.80	Kai Taylor; St Peters Western (Qld)	48.94
200 metre freestyle	Lewis Clareburt; New Zealand	1:45.57	Edward Sommerville; Brisbane Grammar (Qld)	1:46.08	Kai Taylor; St Peters Western (Qld)	1:46.67
400 metre freestyle	Samuel Short; Rackley (Qld)	3:42.53	Elijah Winnington; St Peters Western (Qld)	3:46.36	Lewis Clareburt; New Zealand	3:46.86
800 metre freestyle	Samuel Short; Rackley (Qld)	7:41.04	Elijah Winnington; St Peters Western (Qld)	7:51.74	Tex Cross; Highlanders (WA)	7:57.06
1500 metre freestyle	Samuel Short; Rackley (Qld)	14:54.75	Benjamin Goedemans; St Peters Western (Qld)	15:12.37	Tex Cross; Highlanders (WA)	15:23.24
50 metre backstroke	Mark Nikolaev; Somerset (Qld)	25.20	Isaac Cooper; St Andrew's (Qld)	25.30	Bradley Woodward; Mingara (NSW); Ethan MacDonald; New Zealand	25.82
100 metre backstroke	Mark Nikolaev; Somerset (Qld)	54.69	Enoch Robb; Griffith University (Qld)	55.02	Bradley Woodward; Mingara (NSW)	55.56
200 metre backstroke	Stuart Swinburn; City of Sydney (NSW)	1:58.25	Matthew Magnussen; Nudgee College (Qld)	1:59.96	Enoch Robb; Griffith University (Qld)	2:00.36
50 metre breaststroke	Samuel Williamson; Melbourne Vicentre (Vic)	27.14	Gideon Burnes; Bond (Qld)	27.40	Joshua Anderson; Brisbane Grammar (Qld)	27.66
100 metre breaststroke	Gideon Burnes; Bond (Qld)	1:00.66	Bailey Lello; St Peters Western (Qld)	1:00.67	Zac Stubblety-Cook; Griffith University (Qld)	1:00.86
200 metre breaststroke	Bailey Lello; St Peters Western (Qld)	2:09.79	Zac Stubblety-Cook; Griffith University (Qld)	2:10.03	William Petric; Nunawading (Vic)	2:11.27
50 metre butterfly	Kyle Chalmers; Marion (SA)	22.77 ACR	Ben Armbruster; Bond (Qld)	23.46	Isaac Cooper; St Andrew's (Qld)	23.57
100 metre butterfly	Matthew Temple; Marion (SA)	51.60	Harrison Turner; Nudgee College (Qld)	51.70	Ben Armbruster; Bond (Qld)	52.33
200 metre butterfly	Harrison Turner; Nudgee College (Qld)	1:56.47	Alex Quach; Nudgee College (Qld)	1:58.08	Caio Gallo; Logan Vikings (Qld)	1:58.93
200 metre individual medley	Lewis Clareburt; New Zealand	1:58.42	William Petric; Nunawading (Vic)	1:59.22	Se-Bom Lee; SOPAC (NSW)	2:00.82
400 metre individual medley	Lewis Clareburt; New Zealand	4:10.10	William Petric; Nunawading (Vic)	4:10.20	Se-Bom Lee; SOPAC (NSW)	4:17.40
4 × 100 metre freestyle relay	St Peters Western A (Qld); Kai Taylor (47.97); Jack Cartwright (49.91); Elijah Winnington (49.71); Jamie Jack (47.68)	3:15.27 Club	Nudgee College A (Qld); Dylan Andrea (50.97); Olive Linde (50.45); Alex Quach (49.47); Harrison Turner (48.24)	3:19.13	Bond A (Qld); Ben Armbruster (50.41); Jesse Coleman (50.63); Campbell Wilson-Moran (49.57); Flynn Southam (49.73)	3:20.34
4 × 200 metre freestyle relay	St Peters Western A (Qld); Brendon Smith (1:51.32); Kai Taylor (1:46.43); Elijah Winnington (1:48.12); Matthew Galea (1:51.46)	7:17.33	Nudgee College A (Qld); Alex Quach (1:50.65); Lincoln Burrowes (1:52.27); Matthew Magnussen (1:51.82); Harrison Turner (1:49.87)	7:24.61	St Peters Western B (Qld); Hugh Dolle (1:57.10); Nicholas Nankervis (1:55.18); Bailey Lello (1:52.39); Benjamin Goedemans (1:51.32)	7:35.99
4 × 100 metre medley relay	Bond A (Qld); Campbell Wilson-Moran (56.59); Joshua Collett (1:01.10); Ben Armbruster (51.87); Flynn Southam (49.63)	3:39.19	Nudgee College A (Qld); Matthew Magnussen (57.08); Finlay Schuster (1:02.44); Harrison Turner (52.76); Dylan Andrea (50.21)	3:42.49	Nunawading A (Vic); Will Sharp (57.68); Lachlan Chan (1:01.43); Callum Halloran-Lavelle (53.86); Zander Coates (50.90)	3:43.87
WR World record | CR Commonwealth record | OC Oceanian record | AR Australian record | ACR Australian Allcomers record | Club Australian Club record

=== Men's multi-class events ===
Event	Gold		Silver		Bronze	
50 metre freestyle	Benjamin Hance (S14); St Andrew's (Qld)	23.21 (968)	Rowan Crothers (S10); Marion (SA)	23.59 (946)	Nicholas Layton (S15); Melbourne Vicentre (Vic)	23.76 (924)
100 metre freestyle	Rowan Crothers (S10); Marion (SA)	51.18 (969)	Alexander Tuckfield (S10); Aquablitz (NSW)	53.39 (853)	Callum Simpson (S8); Flinders Phoenix (Qld)	59.36 (832)
200 metre freestyle	Jack Ireland (S14); University of Queensland (Qld)	1:55.92 (880)	Declan Budd (S14); Knox Pymble (NSW)	1:56.61 (864)	Darren Sisman (S14); SLC Aquadot (NSW)	1:57.88 (837)
400 metre freestyle	Callum Simpson (S9); Flinders Phoenix (Qld)	4:29.73 (893)	Harrison Vig (S9); University of Queensland (Qld)	4:20.69 (881)	Brenden Hall (S9); USC Spartans (Qld)	4:21.10 (877)
50 metre backstroke	Benjamin Hance (S14); St Andrew's (Qld)	26.10 (857)	James Logan (S15); Geelong Sharks (Vic)	31.53 (557)	Jack Carey (S15); SOPAC (NSW)	31.89 (539)
100 metre backstroke	Liam Togher (S9); Knox Pymble (NSW)	1:04.20 (805)	Timothy Hodge (S9); Blacktown (NSW)	1:04.25 (803)	Harrison Vig (S9); University of Queensland (Qld)	1:07.58 (690)
50 metre breaststroke	Joshua Willmer (SB8); New Zealand	32.94 (755)	Riley Moore (SB9); Woden Valley (ACT)	31.28 (695)	Beau Matthews (SB9); Aquablitz (NSW)	31.65 (671)
100 metre breaststroke	Jake Michel (SB14); Carina Leagues CJ's (Qld)	1:05.00 (895)	Joshua Willmer (SB8); New Zealand	1:12.53 (789)	Timothy Hodge (SB8); Blacktown (NSW)	1:13.55 (756)
50 metre butterfly	Benjamin Hance (S14); St Andrew's (Qld)	24.21 (906)	Col Pearse (S10); Nunawading (Vic)	26.80 (685)	Ricky Betar (S14); USC Spartans (Qld)	26.61 (682)
100 metre butterfly	Declan Budd (S14); Knox Pymble (NSW)	56.56 (879)	Nicholas Layton (S15); Melbourne Vicentre (Vic)	56.42 (872)	Timothy Hodge (SB8); Blacktown (NSW)	1:01.29 (812)
150 metre individual medley	Ahmed Kelly (SM3); Yarra Plenty (Vic)	3:16.36 (543)	None awarded		None awarded	
200 metre individual medley	Timothy Hodge (SM9); Blacktown (NSW)	2:14.35 (949)	Ricky Betar (SM14); USC Spartans (Qld)	2:13.98 (820)	Beau Matthews (SM10); Aquablitz (NSW)	2:15.98 (789)
WR World record | CR Commonwealth record | OC Oceanian record | AR Australian record | ACR Australian Allcomers record | Club Australian Club record

=== Women's events ===
Event	Gold		Silver		Bronze	
50 metre freestyle	Shayna Jack; St Peters Western (Qld)	24.60	Olivia Wunsch; Carlile (NSW)	24.84	Mollie O'Callaghan; St Peters Western (Qld)	24.89
100 metre freestyle	Mollie O'Callaghan; St Peters Western (Qld)	52.66	Meg Harris; Rackley (Qld)	53.36	Olivia Wunsch; Carlile (NSW)	53.58
200 metre freestyle	Mollie O'Callaghan; St Peters Western (Qld)	1:53.69	Lani Pallister; St Peters Western (Qld)	1:55.66	Erika Fairweather; New Zealand	1:55.72
400 metre freestyle	Lani Pallister; St Peters Western (Qld)	3:59.36	Erika Fairweather; New Zealand	4:02.09	Maria da Costa; Brazil	4:03.41
800 metre freestyle	Lani Pallister; St Peters Western (Qld)	8:11.28	Maria da Costa; Brazil	8:23.98	Erika Fairweather; New Zealand	8:26.55
1500 metre freestyle	Lani Pallister; St Peters Western (Qld)	15:44.07	Gan Ching Hwee; Singapore	16:08.83	Molly Walker; Southern Performance (SA)	16:14.80
50 metre backstroke	Alexandria Perkins; USC Spartans (Qld)	27.79	Savannah Martin; New Zealand	28.03	Mackenzie Burns; St Andrew's (Qld)	28.25
100 metre backstroke	Kaylee McKeown; USC Spartans (Qld)	58.06	Mollie O'Callaghan; St Peters Western (Qld)	58.98	Hannah Fredericks; St Peters Western (Qld)	1:00.19
200 metre backstroke	Kaylee McKeown; USC Spartans (Qld)	2:05.66	Hannah Fredericks; St Peters Western (Qld)	2:08.80	Jenna Forrester; St Peters Western (Qld)	2:10.74
50 metre breaststroke	Sienna Toohey; Albury (NSW)	30.39	Mia O'Leary; Griffith University (Qld)	30.75	Lily Koch; Melbourne Vicentre (Vic)	31.25
100 metre breaststroke	Sienna Toohey; Albury (NSW)	1:06.69	Ella Ramsay; Griffith University (Qld)	1:07.12	Tara Kinder; Melbourne Vicentre (Vic)	1:07.76
200 metre breaststroke	Tara Kinder; Melbourne Vicentre (Vic)	2:24.19	Sienna Toohey; Albury (NSW)	2:26.43	Ella Ramsay; Griffith University (Qld)	2:26.81
50 metre butterfly	Alexandria Perkins; USC Spartans (Qld)	25.62	Hazel Ouwehand; New Zealand	26.13	Mackenzie Burns; St Andrew's (Qld)	26.34
100 metre butterfly	Alexandria Perkins; USC Spartans (Qld)	57.21	Elizabeth Dekkers; St Peters Western (Qld)	58.21	Lily Price; Rackley (Qld)	58.70
200 metre butterfly	Elizabeth Dekkers; St Peters Western (Qld)	2:05.39	Bella Grant; USC Spartans (Qld)	2:09.97	Poppy Stephen; Brisbane Grammar (Qld)	2:10.20
200 metre individual medley	Kaylee McKeown; USC Spartans (Qld)	2:09.22	Ella Ramsay; Griffith University (Qld)	2:09.94	Tara Kinder; Melbourne Vicentre (Vic); Jenna Forrester; St Peters Western (Qld)	2:11.97
400 metre individual medley	Jenna Forrester; St Peters Western (Qld)	4:35.40	Tara Kinder; Melbourne Vicentre (Vic)	4:37.72	Ella Ramsay; Griffith University (Qld)	4:40.78
4 × 100 metre freestyle relay	St Peters Western A (Qld); Milla Jansen (54.18); Shayna Jack (52.95); Mollie O'Callaghan (53.12); Lani Pallister (54.36)	3:34.61 Club	Bond A (Qld); Dominique Melbourn (56.60); Ainsley Trotter (56.24); Mikayla Bird (56.80); Hannah Casey (54.68)	3:45.40	St Peters Western B (Qld); Amelia Weber (55.83); Jacqueline Davison-McGovern (56.29); Stefanie McCarthy (56.67); Jenna Forrester (56.61)	3:45.40
4 × 200 metre freestyle relay	St Peters Western B (Qld); Milla Jansen (2:04.32); Stefanie McCarthy (2:04.94); Lani Pallister (1:58.58); Jenna Forrester (2:04.94)	8:12.78	St Peters Western A (Qld); Amelia Weber (2:04.42); Shayna Jack (2:04.98); Mollie O'Callaghan (1:58.05); Jacqueline Davison-McGovern (2:05.72)	8:13.17	None awarded	
4 × 100 metre medley relay	St Peters Western A (Qld); Mollie O'Callaghan (59.92); Jenna Forrester (1:12.07); Elizabeth Dekkers (59.44); Shayna Jack (53.57)	4:05.00	Bond A (Qld); Layla Day (1:01.36); Tilly King (1:09.59); Claudia Fydler (1:00.20); Hannah Casey (54.15)	4:05.30	Nunawading A (Vic); Semra Olowoniyi (1:02.58); Alannah Torrance (1:11.44); Isabella Boyd (58.17); Abbey Kearney (57.88)	4:10.07
WR World record | CR Commonwealth record | OC Oceanian record | AR Australian record | ACR Australian Allcomers record | Club Australian Club record

=== Women's multi-class events ===
Event	Gold		Silver		Bronze	
50 metre freestyle	Jasmine Greenwood (S10); Woden Valley (ACT)	27.98 (909)	Kirralee Hayes (S13); Genesis (Qld)	27.92 (861)	Madeleine McTernan (S14); Griffith University (Qld)	28.02 (802)
100 metre freestyle	Chloe Osborn (S7); Aquablitz (NSW)	1:12.72 (819)	Lakeisha Patterson (S9); USC Spartans (Qld)	1:03.20 (809)	Ikuha Nakahigashi (S15); Japan	1:02.81 (754)
200 metre freestyle	Madeleine McTernan (S14); Griffith University (Qld)	2:10.63 (816)	Stephanie Bruzzese (S14); PLC Sydney (NSW)	2:16.53 (715)	Jade Lucy (S14); SLC Aquadot (NSW)	2:19.39 (672)
400 metre freestyle	Lakeisha Patterson (S9); USC Spartans (Qld)	4:36.15 (872)	Ikuha Nakahigashi (S15); Japan	4:49.77 (773)	Chloe Osborn (S7); Aquablitz (NSW)	5:19.56 (759)
50 metre backstroke	Ikuha Nakahigashi (S15); Japan	32.42 (741)	Madeleine McTernan (S14); Griffith University (Qld)	32.27 (709)	Elodie Sebire (S18); The Hills (NSW)	45.34 (669)
100 metre backstroke	Madeleine McTernan (S14); Griffith University (Qld)	1:08.94 (802)	Gemma Sellick (S9); Warringah (NSW)	1:15.54 (711)	Elodie Sebire (S18); The Hills (NSW)	1:39.07 (670)
50 metre breaststroke	Imogen Nolan (SB15); Nunawading (Vic)	34.29 (810)	Sahrah Hancock (SB6); Darwin (NT)	47.81 (626)	Summer Klein (SB14); Kincumber Pacific Dolphins (NSW)	40.31 (473)
100 metre breaststroke	Keira Stephens (SB9); Griffith University (Qld)	1:17.23 (777)	Stephanie Bruzzese (SB14); PLC Sydney (NSW)	1:20.36 (720)	Ikuha Nakahigashi (SB15); Japan	1:21.16 (685)
50 metre butterfly	Kael Thompson (S14); USC Spartans (Qld)	30.31 (867)	Montana Atkinson (S14); USC Spartans (Qld)	31.36 (783)	Rylee Sayer (S7); New Zealand	36.66 (729)
100 metre butterfly	Kael Thompson (S14); USC Spartans (Qld)	1:06.73 (825)	Jasmine Greenwood (S10); Woden Valley (ACT)	1:07.39 (802)	Montana Atkinson (S14); USC Spartans (Qld)	1:09.97 (715)
150 metre individual medley	Not contested					
200 metre individual medley	Lakeisha Patterson (SM9); USC Spartans (Qld)	2:38.85 (764)	Ikuha Nakahigashi (SM15); Japan	2:31.18 (763)	Stephanie Bruzzese (SM14); PLC Sydney (NSW)	2:32.59 (746)
WR World record | CR Commonwealth record | OC Oceanian record | AR Australian record | ACR Australian Allcomers record | Club Australian Club record

=== Mixed events ===
Event	Gold		Silver		Bronze	
4 × 100 metre medley relay	St Peters Western A (Qld); Hannah Fredericks (1:01.16); Bailey Lello (1:00.04); Hugh Dolle (54.11); Lani Pallister (54.29)	3:49.60	Bond A (Qld); James Biddington (57.18); Gideon Burnes (1:00.58); Claudia Fydler (1:00.36); Dominique Melbourn (56.77)	3:54.89	Manly A (NSW); Callyn Fenwick-Kearns (56.69); Ethan Buckland (1:04.65); Lexi Harrison (1:01.21); Sarah Locke (56.12)	3:58.67
WR World record | CR Commonwealth record | OC Oceanian record | AR Australian record | ACR Australian Allcomers record | Club Australian Club record

== Records broken ==
During the 2026 Australian Open the following records were set.

Allcomers records set at the 2026 Australian Open
Event	Swimmer	Club	Time	Stage	Previous swimmer	Previous club	Previous time	Previous stage	Previous meet	Date	Difference	Ref
Men's 50 m butterfly	Kyle Chalmers	Marion (SA)	22.77	A Final	Kyle Chalmers	Marion (SA)	22.89	A Final	2025 Australian Swimming Trials	9 June 2025	-0.12	

Club records set at the 2026 Australian Open
Event	Swimmers	Club	Time	Stage	Previous swimmers	Previous club	Previous time	Previous stage	Previous meet	Date	Difference	Ref
Men's 4 × 100 metre freestyle relay	Kai Taylor; Jack Cartwright; Elijah Winnington; Jamie Jack	St Peters Western (Qld)	3:15.27	Timed Final	Jack Cartwright; Clyde Lewis; Max Carleton; Mitch Larkin	St Peters Western (Qld)	3:16.53	Timed Final	2018 Australian Swimming Championships	3 April 2018	-1.26	
Women's 4 × 100 metre freestyle relay	Milla Jansen; Shayna Jack; Mollie O'Callaghan; Lani Pallister	St Peters Western (Qld)	3:34.61	Timed Final	Ariarne Titmus; Meg Harris; Abbey Harkin; Shayna Jack	St Peters Western (Qld)	3:36.27	Timed Final	2019 Australian Swimming Championships	9 April 2019	-1.66	

== Club points scores ==
The final club point scores are below. Note: Only the top ten clubs are listed.

2026 Australian Open club point score
Rank	Club	State	Points
1	St Peters Western	Queensland	1,665
2	Griffith University	Queensland	1,121
3	USC Spartans	Queensland	998
4	Bond	Queensland	775
5	Nunawading	Victoria	767
6	Nudgee College	Queensland	553
7	Rackley	Queensland	448
8	University of Queensland	Queensland	391
9	Marion	South Australia	386
10	St Andrew's	Queensland	382

== Broadcast ==
In January 2025, it was announced that the Nine Network has secured a ten-year multi-platform media agreement with Swimming Australia through to 2034. Both the morning heat sessions and evening final sessions were streamed live on 9Now. The commentary team consisted of Mat Thompson, Jacob Templeton, Matt Welsh and Emily Seebohm with Welsh and Seebohm conducting the poolside interviews.
