= Ben Armbruster =

Australian swimmer

Personal information
- National team: Australia
- Born: 10 May 2002 (age 24) Stanthorpe, Queensland, Australia
- Height: 1.88 m (6 ft 2 in)

Sport
- Sport: Swimming
Medal record
Men's swimming
Representing Australia
Pan Pacific Championships
| Gold medal – first place | 2026 Irvine | 50 m butterfly |
| Silver medal – second place | 2026 Irvine | 100 m butterfly |
Commonwealth Games
| Gold medal – first place | 2026 Glasgow | 50 m butterfly |
| Gold medal – first place | 2026 Glasgow | 4×100 m medley |
| Bronze medal – third place | 2026 Glasgow | 100 m butterfly |

Ben Armbruster (born 10 May 2002) is an Australian competitive swimmer.

== Early life ==
Armbruster was born and raised in the town of Stanthorpe, Queensland.

== Swimming career ==
In May 2022, Armbruster qualified for the Australian team at the 2022 Commonwealth Games after finishing second in the men's 50 m backstroke at the 2022 Australian Swimming Championships. Competing in the men's 50 m backstroke at the 2022 Commonwealth Games, Armbruster reached the final, where he finished seventh.

At the 2024 Australian Swimming Trials in June 2024, Armbruster placed second in the men's 50 m freestyle, qualifying for the 2024 Olympic Games in Paris. In the men's 50 m freestyle at the 2024 Summer Olympics, Armbruster qualified for the semifinals after placing second in his heat. He did not qualify for the final.

At the 2026 Australian Swimming Trials in Sydney in June 2026, Armbruster won the 50 m butterfly, with his time of 22.90 seeing him qualify for the 2026 Commonwealth Games in Glasgow and 2026 Pan Pacific Swimming Championships in Irvine, California.

At the 2026 Commonwealth Games, Armbruster won the bronze medal in the men's 100 m butterfly. In the men's 50 m butterfly, he qualified for the final as the equal-fastest swimmer (with Kyle Chalmers) in a personal-best time of 22.82 seconds. He won the final in another personal-best time of 22.73 seconds, a dead heat with Chalmers. Their joint time was a new Commonwealth Games record and equalled the Oceanian record. Armbruster also swam the butterfly leg in the heats of the men's 4 × 100 metre medley relay, receiving a gold medal after Australia won the final.

== Continental and national records ==
=== Long course (50 m pool) ===
| No. | Event | Time (Split) | Meet | Location | Date | Age | Type | Status | Notes | Ref |
|---|---|---|---|---|---|---|---|---|---|---|
| 1 | 50 m butterfly | 22.73 | 2026 Commonwealth Games | Glasgow, United Kingdom | 29 July 2026 | 24 | OC, NR | Current | Joint record holder | |

Legend: WR – World record; OC – Oceanian record; CR – Commonwealth record; NR – Australian record; e – equalled existing record;
Records not set in finals: h – heat; sf – semifinal; r – relay 1st leg; rh – relay heat 1st leg; b – B final; † – en route to final mark; so – swim-off; tt – time trial

=== Short course (25 m pool) ===
| No. | Event | Time (Split) | | Meet | Location | Date | Age | Type | Status | Notes | Ref |
|---|---|---|---|---|---|---|---|---|---|---|---|
| 1 | 50 m butterfly | 22.00 | h | 2026 Australian Short Course Swimming Championships | Sydney | 29 September 2026 | 24 | OC, NR | Former | | |
| 2 | 50 m butterfly (2) | 21.90 | | 2026 Australian Short Course Swimming Championships | Sydney | 29 September 2026 | 24 | OC, NR | Current | | |

Legend: WR – World record; OC – Oceanian record; CR – Commonwealth record; NR – Australian record; e – equalled existing record;
Records not set in finals: h – heat; sf – semifinal; r – relay 1st leg; rh – relay heat 1st leg; b – B final; † – en route to final mark; so – swim-off; tt – time trial

== See also ==
- List of Commonwealth Games medallists in swimming (men)
