= Inaburra School =

Location
- Billa Road, Bangor, New South Wales; Australia; 34°00′52″S 151°01′34″E

Information
- Type: Independent co-educational primary and secondary day school
- Motto: Faith, Knowledge, Love
- Established: 1982; 44 years ago
- Educational authority: NSW Department of Education
- Chairman: Robert Dougall
- Principal: James Pietsch
- Employees: 160
- Years: K–12
- Enrolment: c. 1,100
- Colours: Blue and gold
- Website: www.inaburra.nsw.edu.au

Inaburra School is an independent Christian co-educational primary and secondary day school, located in Bangor, a southern suburb of Sydney, New South Wales, Australia. Established in 1982, Inaburra caters for students from Kindergarten to Year 12.

Inaburra is a project of the Menai Baptist Church, however is an independent Christian religious school with non-selective enrolment policy.

== Governance ==
Inaburra School is operated by Inaburra School Limited. The principal and all staff are employed by Inaburra School Limited.

== History ==
The establishment of the Inaburra School can be credited to the Menai Baptist Church who originally wished to establish a Christian school in Menai. The church identified a need for a Christian school in the area due to its rapidly growing population and the lack of a government high school.

A portable building was erected close to the Billa Road site for the use of the preschool and church in 1980, and in 1982 Inaburra officially commenced as a secondary school in temporary accommodation at the Christian Education Center at Gymea Baptist Church.

The name 'Inaburra' was chosen as it Wiradjuri word meaning 'dream'. It also uses Aboriginal names for the clubs and sports colours.

== Principals ==
| Ordinal | Officeholder | Term start | Term end |
|---|---|---|---|
| 1 | Rev. W.M. Knight | 1982 | 1990 |
| 2 | John Merchant | 1991 | 1995 |
| 3 | Ross Whelan | 1995 | 2005 |
| 4 | Paul Burgis | 2005 | 2010 |
| 5 | Tim Bowden | 2011 | 2017 |
| 6 | James Pietsch | 2018 | 2026 |
| 7 | Robert Loe | 2027 | incumbent |

== Curriculum ==
Inaburra School is a registered and accredited school, teaching the NSW Board of Studies Curriculum from Kindergarten to Year 12. Students undertake all NAPLAN tests and the Higher School Certificate in Year 12.

Inaburra has two sections:

- The Junior School (Kindergarten to Year 6)
- The Senior School (Year 7 to Year 12)

The Junior School and Senior School are both located on the Inaburra Campus.

== Notable alumni ==
- Rohan Browning, Olympian sprinter
- Matt Corby, singer and songwriter
- Brielle Davis, Australian recording artist
- Melissa Leong, Masterchef Australia judge
- Beau Matthews, Paralympic Swimmer

== Principals ==
| Ordinal | Officeholder | Term start | Term end | Time in office | Notes |
|---|---|---|---|---|---|
| 1 | Rev. W.M. Knight | 1982 | 1990 | 7–8 years | |
| 2 | John Merchant | 1991 | 1995 | 3–4 years | |
| 3 | Ross Whelan | 1995 | 2005 | 9–10 years | |
| 4 | Paul Burgis | 2005 | 2010 | 4–5 years | |
| 5 | Tim Bowden | 2011 | 2017 | 5–6 years | |
| 6 | James Pietsch | 2018 | 2026 | 7–8 years | |
| 7 | Robert Loe | 2027 | onward | 7–8 years | |

== See also ==
- List of non-government schools in New South Wales
