= Swimming at the 2026 Commonwealth Games – Men's 100 metre breaststroke SB9 =

Men's 100 metre breaststroke SB9 at the 2026 Commonwealth Games
- Venue: Tollcross International Swimming Centre
- Dates: 27 July
- Competitors: 10 from 7 nations
- Winning time: 1:09.41

Medalists
| gold medal | Beau Matthews | Australia |
| silver medal | Joshua Willmer | New Zealand |
| bronze medal | Timothy Hodge | Australia |

The men's 100 metre breaststroke SB9 event at the 2026 Commonwealth Games was held on 27 July at the Tollcross International Swimming Centre.

== Schedule ==
The schedule is as follows:

All times are British Summer Time (UTC+1)

| Date | Time | Round |
|---|---|---|
| Monday 27 July 2026 | 10:30 | Heat |
| Monday 27 July 2026 | 19:00 | Final |

== Results ==
=== Heat ===
The heat was held on the morning of 27 July 2026.

Heat results
| Rank | Lane | Swimmer | Nation | Time | Notes |
|---|---|---|---|---|---|
| 1 | 2 | Fernando Lu (SB9) | Canada | 1:11.62 | Q |
| 2 | 1 | Joshua Willmer (SB8) | New Zealand | 1:11.99 | Q |
| 3 | 2 | Beau Matthews (SB9) | Australia | 1:12.74 | Q |
| 4 | 1 | Timothy Hodge (SB8) | Australia | 1:13.60 | Q |
| 5 | 2 | Jack Gill (SB9) | Canada | 1:13.65 | Q |
| 6 | 2 | Swatik Patil (SB9) | India | 1:15.85 | Q |
| 7 | 1 | Abd Halim Mohammad (SB8) | Malaysia | 1:16.82 | Q |
| 8 | 1 | Oliver Carter (SB9) | Scotland | 1:16.86 | Q |
| 9 | 2 | Alec Elliot (SB9) | Canada | 1:17.52 | R |
| 10 | 1 | Promise Aheto (SB9) | Ghana | 1:41.59 | R |

=== Final ===
The final will take place during of the evening of 27 July 2026.

Final results
| Rank | Lane | Swimmer | Nation | Time | Notes |
|---|---|---|---|---|---|
| 1st place, gold medalist(s) | 3 | Beau Matthews (SB9) | Australia | 1:09.41 | |
| 2nd place, silver medalist(s) | 5 | Joshua Willmer (SB8) | New Zealand | 1:10.84 | |
| 3rd place, bronze medalist(s) | 6 | Timothy Hodge (SB8) | Australia | 1:12.74 | |
| 4 | 2 | Jack Gill (SB9) | Canada | 1:12.79 | |
| 5 | 7 | Swatik Patil (SB9) | India | 1:15.82 | |
| 6 | 1 | Abd Halim Mohammad (SB8) | Malaysia | 1:16.41 | |
| | 4 | Fernando Lu (SB9) | Canada | | DSQ |
| | 8 | Oliver Carter (SB9) | Scotland | | DSQ |
