= Swimming at the 2022 Commonwealth Games – Men's 100 metre breaststroke SB8 =

Men's 100 metre breaststroke SB8 at the 2022 Commonwealth Games
- Venue: Sandwell Aquatics Centre
- Dates: 31 July 2022
- Competitors: 5 from 3 nations
- Winning time: 1:14.12

Medalists
gold medal	Joshua Willmer	New Zealand
silver medal	Timothy Hodge	Australia
bronze medal	Blake Cochrane	Australia

The men's 100 metre breaststroke SB8 event at the 2022 Commonwealth Games was held on 31 July at the Sandwell Aquatics Centre.

== Schedule ==
The schedule is as follows:

All times are British Summer Time (UTC+1)

Date	Time	Round
Sunday 31 July 2022	19:42	Final

== Results ==
=== Final ===
Rank	Lane	Name	Nationality	Time	Notes
1st place, gold medalist(s)	3	Joshua Willmer	New Zealand	1:14.12	
2nd place, silver medalist(s)	4	Timothy Hodge	Australia	1:14.19	
3rd place, bronze medalist(s)	5	Blake Cochrane	Australia	1:18.97	
4	2	Jesse Reynolds	New Zealand	1:20.93	
5	6	Christian Sadie	South Africa	1:22.14	
