= Joshua Willmer =

New Zealand para-swimmer

Personal information
- Born: 1 December 2004 (age 21) Ōtāhuhu, Auckland, New Zealand

Sport
- Sport: Swimming
- Classifications: S9, SB8
- Club: Pukekohe Swimming Club
- Coach: Shaun Foley, Sheldon Kemp
Medal record
Men's para swimming
Representing New Zealand
Commonwealth Games
Gold medal – first place	2022 Birmingham	100 m breaststroke SB8
Silver medal – second place	2026 Glasgow	100 m breaststroke SB9

Joshua Willmer (born 1 December 2004) is a New Zealand para-swimmer who represented his country at the 2022 World Para Swimming Championships and 2022 Commonwealth Games, where he won a gold medal in the 100 m breaststroke SB8 event.

Willmer was educated at Howick College in Auckland.
