= List of Oceanian records in swimming =

Oceania

Below is a list of current Oceanian swimming records as ratified by the continental governing body Oceania Swimming Association.

Currently, Australian swimmers hold all Oceanian records except for 3 held by New Zealanders:

- the men's long-course and short-course 200m butterfly, both held by Moss Burmester
- the men's long-course 400m individual medley, held by Lewis Clareburt

== Long course (50 metres) ==
=== Men ===
Event	Time		Name	Nationality	Date	Meet	Location	Ref
50 m freestyle	20.88	WR	Cameron McEvoy	Australia	20 March 2026	China Open	Shenzhen, China	
100 m freestyle	47.04	CR	Cameron McEvoy	Australia	11 April 2016	Australian Championships	Adelaide, Australia	
200 m freestyle	1:44.06	CR	Ian Thorpe	Australia	25 July 2001	World Championships	Fukuoka, Japan	
400 m freestyle	3:40.08	CR	Ian Thorpe	Australia	30 July 2002	Commonwealth Games	Manchester, United Kingdom	
800 m freestyle	7:36.73	CR	Samuel Short	Australia	10 June 2026	Australian Trials	Sydney, Australia	
1500 m freestyle	14:33.97	CR	Samuel Short	Australia	15 August 2026	Pan Pacific Championships	Irvine, United States	
50 m backstroke	24.12	sf	Isaac Cooper	Australia	17 February 2024	World Championships	Doha, Qatar	
100 m backstroke	52.11		Mitch Larkin	Australia	6 November 2015	World Cup	Dubai, United Arab Emirates	
200 m backstroke	1:53.17	CR	Mitch Larkin	Australia	7 November 2015	World Cup	Dubai, United Arab Emirates	
50 m breaststroke	26.32		Samuel Williamson	Australia	14 February 2024	World Championships	Doha, Qatar	
100 m breaststroke	58.58		Brenton Rickard	Australia	27 July 2009	World Championships	Rome, Italy	
200 m breaststroke	2:05.95	CR	Zac Stubblety-Cook	Australia	19 May 2022	Australian Championships	Adelaide, Australia	
50 m butterfly	22.73	=	Matt Targett	Australia	27 July 2009	World Championships	Rome, Italy	
50 m butterfly	22.73	=	Kyle Chalmers	Australia	29 July 2026	Commonwealth Games	Glasgow, United Kingdom	
50 m butterfly	22.73	=	Ben Armbruster	Australia	29 July 2026	Commonwealth Games	Glasgow, United Kingdom	
100 m butterfly	50.25		Matthew Temple	Australia	3 December 2023	Japan Open	Tokyo, Japan	
200 m butterfly	1:54.15		Moss Burmester	New Zealand	4 April 2009	New Zealand Championships	Christchurch, New Zealand	
200 m individual medley	1:55.72		Mitch Larkin	Australia	12 June 2019	Australian World Championships Trials	Brisbane, Australia	
400 m individual medley	4:08.70	CR	Lewis Clareburt	New Zealand	30 July 2022	Commonwealth Games	Birmingham, Great Britain	
4×100 m freestyle relay	3:08.97	CR	Flynn Southam (47.77); Kai Taylor (47.04); Maximillian Giuliani (47.63); Kyle Chalmers (46.53)	Australia	27 July 2025	World Championships	Singapore, Singapore	
4×200 m freestyle relay	7:00.85		Clyde Lewis (1:45.58); Kyle Chalmers (1:45.37); Alexander Graham (1:45.05); Mack Horton (1:44.85)	Australia	26 July 2019	World Championships	Gwangju, South Korea	
4×100 m medley relay	3:28.64		Ashley Delaney (53.10); Brenton Rickard (57.80); Andrew Lauterstein (50.58); Matt Targett (47.16)	Australia	2 August 2009	World Championships	Rome, Italy	

Legend: # – Record awaiting ratification by Oceania Aquatics; WR – World record; CR – Commonwealth record; e – equalled existing record;
Records not set in finals: h – heat; sf – semifinal; r – relay 1st leg; rh – relay heat 1st leg; b – B final; † – en route to final mark; so – swim-off; tt – time trial

=== Women ===
Event	Time		Name	Nationality	Date	Meet	Location	Ref
50 m freestyle	23.78	CR	Cate Campbell	Australia	7 April 2018	Commonwealth Games	Gold Coast, Australia	
100 m freestyle	51.96	CR	Emma McKeon	Australia	30 July 2021	Olympic Games	Tokyo, Japan	
200 m freestyle	1:52.23	WR	Ariarne Titmus	Australia	12 June 2024	Australian Olympic Trials	Brisbane, Australia	
400 m freestyle	3:55.38		Ariarne Titmus	Australia	23 July 2023	World Championships	Fukuoka, Japan	
800 m freestyle	8:05.98		Lani Pallister	Australia	2 August 2025	World Championships	Singapore, Singapore	
1500 m freestyle	15:38.62	CR	Lani Pallister	Australia	12 August 2026	Pan Pacific Championships	Irvine, United States	
50 m backstroke	26.86	WR	Kaylee McKeown	Australia	20 October 2023	World Cup	Budapest, Hungary	
100 m backstroke	57.16	CR	Kaylee McKeown	Australia	29 July 2025	World Championships	Singapore, Singapore	
200 m backstroke	2:03.14	WR	Kaylee McKeown	Australia	10 March 2023	NSW State Championships	Sydney, Australia	
50 m breaststroke	30.05		Chelsea Hodges	Australia	30 July 2022	Commonwealth Games	Birmingham, Great Britain	
100 m breaststroke	1:05.09		Leisel Jones	Australia	20 March 2006	Commonwealth Games	Melbourne, Australia	
200 m breaststroke	2:20.54		Leisel Jones	Australia	1 February 2006	Australian Championships	Melbourne, Australia	
50 m butterfly	25.31	=	Holly Barratt	Australia	16 August 2019	World Cup	Singapore, Singapore	
50 m butterfly	25.31	=	Alexandria Perkins	Australia	1 August 2025	World Championships	Singapore, Singapore	
100 m butterfly	55.72		Emma McKeon	Australia	26 July 2021	Olympic Games	Tokyo, Japan	
200 m butterfly	2:03.41		Jessicah Schipper	Australia	30 July 2009	World Championships	Rome, Italy	
200 m individual medley	2:06.63		Kaylee McKeown	Australia	10 June 2024	Australian Olympic Trials	Brisbane, Australia	
400 m individual medley	4:28.22		Kaylee McKeown	Australia	18 April 2024	Australian Championships	Gold Coast, Australia	
4×100 m freestyle relay	3:27.96	WR	Mollie O'Callaghan (52.08); Shayna Jack (51.69); Meg Harris (52.29); Emma McKeon (51.90)	Australia	23 July 2023	World Championships	Fukuoka, Japan	
4×200 m freestyle relay	7:37.50	WR	Mollie O'Callaghan (1:53.66); Shayna Jack (1:55.63); Brianna Throssell (1:55.80); Ariarne Titmus (1:52.41)	Australia	27 July 2023	World Championships	Fukuoka, Japan	
4×100 m medley relay	3:51.60	CR	Kaylee McKeown (58.01); Chelsea Hodges (1:05.57); Emma McKeon (55.91); Cate Campbell (52.11)	Australia	1 August 2021	Olympic Games	Tokyo, Japan	

Legend: # – Record awaiting ratification by Oceania Aquatics; WR – World record; CR – Commonwealth record; e – equalled existing record;
Records not set in finals: h – heat; sf – semifinal; r – relay 1st leg; rh – relay heat 1st leg; b – B final; † – en route to final mark; so – swim-off; tt – time trial

=== Mixed relay ===
Event	Time		Name	Nationality	Date	Meet	Location	Ref
4×100 m freestyle relay	3:18.83	CR	Jack Cartwright (48.14); Kyle Chalmers (47.25); Shayna Jack (51.73); Mollie O'Callaghan (51.71)	Australia	29 July 2023	World Championships	Fukuoka, Japan	
4×100 m medley relay	3:38.76		Kaylee McKeown (57.90); Joshua Yong (58.43); Matthew Temple (50.42); Mollie O'Callaghan (52.01)	Australia	3 August 2024	Olympic Games	Paris, France	

Legend: # – Record awaiting ratification by Oceania Aquatics; WR – World record; CR – Commonwealth record; e – equalled existing record;
Records not set in finals: h – heat; so – swim-off

== Short course (25 metres) ==
=== Men ===
Event	Time		Name	Nationality	Date	Meet	Location	Ref
50 m freestyle	20.13		Cameron McEvoy	Australia	8 October 2026	World Cup	Tashkent, Uzbekistan	
100 m freestyle	44.84	WR	Kyle Chalmers	Australia	29 October 2021	World Cup	Kazan, Russia	
200 m freestyle	1:40.16		Edward Sommerville	Australia	29 September 2026	Australian Championships	Sydney, Australia	
400 m freestyle	3:34.58		Grant Hackett	Australia	18 July 2002	2nd Australian Grand Prix	Sydney, Australia	
800 m freestyle	7:23.42	CR	Grant Hackett	Australia	20 July 2008	Victorian Championships	Melbourne, Australia	
1500 m freestyle	14:10.10	CR	Grant Hackett	Australia	7 August 2001	Australian Championships	Perth, Australia	
50 m backstroke	22.49	CR	Isaac Cooper	Australia	13 December 2024	World Championships	Budapest, Hungary	
100 m backstroke	49.03	r, CR	Mitch Larkin	Australia	28 November 2015	Australian Championships	Sydney, Australia	
200 m backstroke	1:45.63	CR	Mitch Larkin	Australia	27 November 2015	Australian Championships	Sydney, Australia	
50m breaststroke	26.02		Grayson Bell	Australia	27 September 2024	Australian Championships	Adelaide, Australia	
100m breaststroke	56.61		Joshua Collett	Australia	29 September 2026	Australian Championships	Sydney, Australia	
200m breaststroke	2:01.67		Joshua Yong	Australia	20 October 2024	World Cup	Shanghai, China	
50m butterfly	21.90		Ben Armbruster	Australia	29 September 2026	Australian Championships	Sydney, Australia	
100m butterfly	48.62		Matthew Temple	Australia	13 December 2023	SASI Time Trial	Adelaide, Australia	
200m butterfly	1:51.05		Moss Burmester	New Zealand	13 April 2008	World Championships	Manchester, United Kingdom	
100m individual medley	51.19		Kenneth To	Australia	20 October 2013	World Cup	Doha, Qatar	
200m individual medley	1:52.01		Kenneth To	Australia	11 August 2013	World Cup	Berlin, Germany	
400m individual medley	3:57.91	CR	Thomas Fraser-Holmes	Australia	28 November 2015	Australian Championships	Sydney, Australia	
4×50m freestyle relay	1:23.44	CR	Isaac Cooper (21.25); Matthew Temple (20.75); Flynn Southam (21.10); Kyle Chalmers (20.34)	Australia	15 December 2022	World Championships	Melbourne, Australia	
4×100m freestyle relay	3:04.63	CR	Flynn Southam (47.04); Matthew Temple (46.06); Thomas Neill (46.55); Kyle Chalmers (44.98)	Australia	13 December 2022	World Championships	Melbourne, Australia	
4×200m freestyle relay	6:45.54	CR	Maximillian Giuliani (1:40.73); Edward Sommerville (1:41.03); Harrison Turner (1:42.21); Elijah Winnington (1:41.57)	Australia	13 December 2024	World Championships	Budapest, Hungary	
4×50m medley relay	1:30.81	CR	Isaac Cooper (22.66); Grayson Bell (25.92); Matthew Temple (21.75); Kyle Chalmers (20.48)	Australia	17 December 2022	World Championships	Melbourne, Australia	
4×100m medley relay	3:18.98	CR	Isaac Cooper (49.46); Joshua Yong (56.55); Matthew Temple (48.34); Kyle Chalmers (44.63)	Australia	18 December 2022	World Championships	Melbourne, Australia	

Legend: # – Record awaiting ratification by Oceania Aquatics; WR – World record; CR – Commonwealth record; e – equalled existing record;
Records not set in finals: h – heat; sf – semifinal; r – relay 1st leg; rh – relay heat 1st leg; b – B final; † – en route to final mark; so – swim-off; tt – time trial

=== Women ===
Event	Time		Name	Nationality	Date	Meet	Location	Ref
50 m freestyle	23.04	CR	Emma McKeon	Australia	17 December 2022	World Championships	Melbourne, Australia	
100 m freestyle	50.25	CR	Cate Campbell	Australia	26 October 2017	Australian Championships	Adelaide, Australia	
200 m freestyle	1:49.36	WR	Mollie O'Callaghan	Australia	24 October 2025	World Cup	Toronto, Canada	
400 m freestyle	3:51.87		Lani Pallister	Australia	23 October 2025	World Cup	Toronto, Canada	
800 m freestyle	7:54.00	WR	Lani Pallister	Australia	25 October 2025	World Cup	Toronto, Canada	
1500 m freestyle	15:13.83	CR	Lani Pallister	Australia	19 October 2025	World Cup	Westmont, United States	
50 m backstroke	25.35		Kaylee McKeown	Australia	23 October 2025	World Cup	Toronto, Canada	
100 m backstroke	54.49	CR	Kaylee McKeown	Australia	24 October 2025	World Cup	Toronto, Canada	
200 m backstroke	1:57.33	WR	Kaylee McKeown	Australia	25 October 2025	World Cup	Toronto, Canada	
50 m breaststroke	29.50		Sarah Katsoulis	Australia	22 November 2009	World Cup	Singapore, Singapore	
100 m breaststroke	1:03.00		Leisel Jones	Australia	14 November 2009	World Cup	Berlin, Germany	
200 m breaststroke	2:15.42	CR	Leisel Jones	Australia	15 November 2009	World Cup	Berlin, Germany	
50 m butterfly	24.60	CR	Alexandria Perkins	Australia	18 October 2025	World Cup	Westmont, United States	
100 m butterfly	54.93		Alexandria Perkins	Australia	12 October 2025	World Cup	Carmel, United States	
200 m butterfly	2:02.88		Ellen Gandy	Australia	25 August 2013	Australian Championships	Sydney, Australia	
100m individual medley	57.53		Alicia Coutts	Australia	10 November 2013	World Cup	Tokyo, Japan	
200m individual medley	2:03.57		Kaylee McKeown	Australia	13 December 2022	World Championships	Melbourne, Australia	
400m individual medley	4:28.39		Jenna Forrester	Australia	30 September 2026	Australian Championships	Sydney, Australia	
4×50m freestyle relay	1:34.23	CR	Meg Harris (23.98); Madison Wilson (23.51); Mollie O'Callaghan (24.01); Emma McKeon (22.73)	Australia	15 December 2022	World Championships	Melbourne, Australia	
4×100m freestyle relay	3:25.43	CR	Mollie O'Callaghan (52.19); Madison Wilson (51.28); Meg Harris (52.00); Emma McKeon (49.96)	Australia	13 December 2022	World Championships	Melbourne, Australia	
4×200m freestyle relay	7:30.87	CR	Madison Wilson (1:53.13); Mollie O'Callaghan (1:52.83); Leah Neale (1:52.67); Lani Pallister (1:52.24)	Australia	14 December 2022	World Championships	Melbourne, Australia	
4×50m medley relay	1:42.35	WR	Mollie O'Callaghan (25.49); Chelsea Hodges (29.11); Emma McKeon (24.43); Madison Wilson (23.32)	Australia	17 December 2022	World Championships	Melbourne, Australia	
4×100m medley relay	3:44.92	CR	Kaylee McKeown (55.74); Jenna Strauch (1:04.49); Emma McKeon (53.93); Meg Harris (50.76)	Australia	18 December 2022	World Championships	Melbourne, Australia	

Legend: # – Record awaiting ratification by Oceania Aquatics; WR – World record; CR – Commonwealth record; e – equalled existing record;
Records not set in finals: h – heat; sf – semifinal; r – relay 1st leg; rh – relay heat 1st leg; b – B final; † – en route to final mark; so – swim-off; tt – time trial

=== Mixed relay ===
Event	Time	Name	Nationality	Date	Meet	Location	Ref
4×50 m freestyle relay	1:28.03	Kyle Chalmers (20.97); Matthew Temple (20.71); Meg Harris (23.73); Emma McKeon (22.62)	Australia	16 December 2022	World Championships	Melbourne, Australia	
4×50 m medley relay	1:36.78	Isaac Cooper (22.68); Joshua Yong (25.87); Alexandria Perkins (24.61); Meg Harris (23.62)	Australia	11 December 2024	World Championships	Budapest, Hungary	
4×100 m medley relay	3:32.83	Iona Anderson (55.89); Joshua Yong (56.40); Matthew Temple (48.63); Milla Jansen (51.91)	Australia	14 December 2024	World Championships	Budapest, Hungary	

Legend: # – Record awaiting ratification by Oceania Aquatics; WR – World record; CR – Commonwealth record; e – equalled existing record;
Records not set in finals: h – heat; so – swim-off
