= List of Commonwealth records in swimming =

Below is a list of current Commonwealth swimming records. This includes all countries that make up the Commonwealth of Nations. Of the 92 events, Australia currently holds records in 47 of them, Canada 20, Great Britain 13, South Africa 7, New Zealand 3, Jamaica 2, and Cayman Islands 1.

This is not to be confused with Commonwealth Games records which are championship records attained in those Games only.

== Long course (50 metres) ==
=== Men ===
Event	Time		Name	Nationality	Date	Meet	Location	Ref
50 m freestyle	20.88	WR	Cameron McEvoy	Australia	20 March 2026	China Open	Shenzhen, China	
100 m freestyle	47.04	OC	Cameron McEvoy	Australia	11 April 2016	Australian Championships	Adelaide, Australia	
200 m freestyle	1:44.06	OC	Ian Thorpe	Australia	25 July 2001	World Championships	Fukuoka, Japan	
400 m freestyle	3:40.08	OC	Ian Thorpe	Australia	30 July 2002	Commonwealth Games	Manchester, United Kingdom	
800 m freestyle	7:36.73	OC	Samuel Short	Australia	10 June 2026	Australian Trials	Sydney, Australia	
1500 m freestyle	14:33.97	OC	Samuel Short	Australia	15 August 2026	Pan Pacific Championships	Irvine, United States	
50 m backstroke	24.04		Liam Tancock	Great Britain	2 August 2009	World Championships	Rome, Italy	
100 m backstroke	51.71	r, AF	Pieter Coetze	South Africa	29 July 2026	Commonwealth Games	Glasgow, United Kingdom	
200 m backstroke	1:53.17	OC	Mitch Larkin	Australia	7 November 2015	World Cup	Dubai, United Arab Emirates	
50 m breaststroke	25.95	sf, WR	Adam Peaty	Great Britain	25 July 2017	World Championships	Budapest, Hungary	
100 m breaststroke	56.88	sf, WR	Adam Peaty	Great Britain	21 July 2019	World Championships	Gwangju, South Korea	
200 m breaststroke	2:05.95	OC	Zac Stubblety-Cook	Australia	19 May 2022	Australian Championships	Adelaide, Australia	
50 m butterfly	22.68		Ilya Kharun	Canada	12 June 2025	Canadian Trials	Victoria, Canada	
100 m butterfly	49.99		Joshua Liendo	Canada	3 August 2024	Olympic Games	Paris, France	
200 m butterfly	1:52.80		Ilya Kharun	Canada	31 July 2024	Olympic Games	Paris, France	
200 m individual medley	1:55.28		Duncan Scott	Great Britain	30 July 2021	Olympic Games	Tokyo, Japan	
400 m individual medley	4:08.70	OC	Lewis Clareburt	New Zealand	30 July 2022	Commonwealth Games	Birmingham, United Kingdom	
4 × 100 m freestyle relay	3:08.97	OC	Flynn Southam (47.77); Kai Taylor (47.04); Maximillian Giuliani (47.63); Kyle Chalmers (46.53)	Australia	27 July 2025	World Championships	Singapore, Singapore	
4 × 200 m freestyle relay	6:58.58	ER	Tom Dean (1:45.72); James Guy (1:44.40); Matthew Richards (1:45.01); Duncan Scott (1:43.45)	Great Britain	28 July 2021	Olympic Games	Tokyo, Japan	
4 × 100 m medley relay	3:27.51		Luke Greenbank (53.63); Adam Peaty (56.53); James Guy (50.27); Duncan Scott (47.08)	Great Britain	1 August 2021	Olympic Games	Tokyo, Japan	

Legend: WR – World record; AF – African record; AS – Asian record; ER – European record; OC – Oceanian record; e – equalled existing record;
Records not set in finals: h – heat; sf – semifinal; r – relay 1st leg; rh – relay heat 1st leg; b – B final; † – en route to final mark; so – swim-off; tt – time trial

=== Women ===
Event	Time		Name	Nationality	Date	Meet	Location	Ref
50 m freestyle	23.78	OC	Cate Campbell	Australia	7 April 2018	Commonwealth Games	Gold Coast, Australia	
100 m freestyle	51.96	OC	Emma McKeon	Australia	30 July 2021	Olympic Games	Tokyo, Japan	
200 m freestyle	1:52.23	WR	Ariarne Titmus	Australia	12 June 2024	Australian Olympic Trials	Brisbane, Australia	
400 m freestyle	3:54.18	WR	Summer McIntosh	Canada	7 June 2025	Canadian Trials	Victoria, Canada	
800 m freestyle	8:05.07		Summer McIntosh	Canada	8 June 2025	Canadian Trials	Victoria, Canada	
1500 m freestyle	15:38.62	OC	Lani Pallister	Australia	12 August 2026	Pan Pacific Championships	Irvine, United States	
50 m backstroke	26.86	WR	Kaylee McKeown	Australia	20 October 2023	World Cup	Budapest, Hungary	
100 m backstroke	57.16	OC	Kaylee McKeown	Australia	29 July 2025	World Championships	Singapore, Singapore	
200 m backstroke	2:03.14	WR	Kaylee McKeown	Australia	10 March 2023	NSW State Championships	Sydney, Australia	
50 m breaststroke	29.72	h, AF	Lara van Niekerk	South Africa	6 April 2022	South African Championships	Port Elizabeth, South Africa	
100 m breaststroke	1:04.82	h, AF	Tatjana Schoenmaker	South Africa	25 July 2021	Olympic Games	Tokyo, Japan	
200 m breaststroke	2:18.95	AF	Tatjana Schoenmaker	South Africa	30 July 2021	Olympic Games	Tokyo, Japan	
50 m butterfly	25.20		Francesca Halsall	Great Britain	27 July 2014	Commonwealth Games	Glasgow, United Kingdom	
100 m butterfly	55.59		Margaret MacNeil	Canada	26 July 2021	Olympic Games	Tokyo, Japan	
200 m butterfly	2:01.65	WR	Summer McIntosh	Canada	5 July 2026	Canadian Trials	Montreal, Canada	
200 m individual medley	2:05.70	WR	Summer McIntosh	Canada	9 June 2025	Canadian Trials	Victoria, Canada	
400 m individual medley	4:23.65	WR	Summer McIntosh	Canada	11 June 2025	Canadian Trials	Victoria, Canada	
4 × 100 m freestyle relay	3:27.96	WR	Mollie O'Callaghan (52.08); Shayna Jack (51.69); Meg Harris (52.29); Emma McKeon (51.90)	Australia	23 July 2023	World Championships	Fukuoka, Japan	
4 × 200 m freestyle relay	7:37.50	WR	Mollie O'Callaghan (1:53.66); Shayna Jack (1:55.63); Brianna Throssell (1:55.80); Ariarne Titmus (1:52.41)	Australia	27 July 2023	World Championships	Fukuoka, Japan	
4 × 100 m medley relay	3:51.60	OC	Kaylee McKeown (58.01); Chelsea Hodges (1:05.57); Emma McKeon (55.91); Cate Campbell (52.11)	Australia	1 August 2021	Olympic Games	Tokyo, Japan	

Legend: WR – World record; AF – African record; AM – Americas record; ER – European record; OC – Oceanian record; e – equalled existing record;
Records not set in finals: h – heat; sf – semifinal; r – relay 1st leg; rh – relay heat 1st leg; b – B final; † – en route to final mark; so – swim-off; tt – time trial

=== Mixed relay ===
Event	Time		Name	Nationality	Date	Meet	Location	Ref
4 × 100 m freestyle relay	3:18.83	OC	Jack Cartwright (48.14); Kyle Chalmers (47.25); Shayna Jack (51.73); Mollie O'Callaghan (51.71)	Australia	29 July 2023	World Championships	Fukuoka, Japan	
4 × 100 m medley relay	3:37.58	ER	Kathleen Dawson (58.80); Adam Peaty (56.78); James Guy (50.00); Anna Hopkin (52.00)	Great Britain	31 July 2021	Olympic Games	Tokyo, Japan	

Legend: WR – World record; AF – African record; AS – Asian record; ER – European record; OC – Oceanian record; e – equalled existing record;
Records not set in finals: h – heat; so – swim-off

== Short course (25 metres) ==
=== Men ===
Event	Time		Name	Nationality	Date	Meet	Location	Ref
50 m freestyle	19.90	sf, WR	Jordan Crooks	Cayman Islands	14 December 2024	World Championships	Budapest, Hungary	
100 m freestyle	44.84	WR	Kyle Chalmers	Australia	29 October 2021	World Cup	Kazan, Russia	
200 m freestyle	1:39.83		Duncan Scott	Great Britain	2 November 2024	World Cup	Incheon, South Korea	
400 m freestyle	3:34.46		Duncan Scott	Great Britain	31 October 2024	World Cup	Singapore, Singapore	
800 m freestyle	7:23.42	OC	Grant Hackett	Australia	20 July 2008	Victorian Championships	Melbourne, Australia	
1500 m freestyle	14:10.10	OC	Grant Hackett	Australia	7 August 2001	Australian Championships	Perth, Australia	
50 m backstroke	22.49	OC	Isaac Cooper	Australia	13 December 2024	World Championships	Budapest, Hungary	
100 m backstroke	49.03	r, OC	Mitch Larkin	Australia	28 November 2015	Australian Championships	Sydney, Australia	
200 m backstroke	1:45.63	OC	Mitch Larkin	Australia	27 November 2015	Australian Championships	Sydney, Australia	
50 m breaststroke	25.25	AF	Cameron van der Burgh	South Africa	14 November 2009	World Cup	Berlin, Germany	
100 m breaststroke	55.41		Adam Peaty	Great Britain	22 November 2020	International Swimming League	Budapest, Hungary	
200 m breaststroke	2:01.43		Michael Jamieson	Great Britain	15 December 2013	European Championships	Herning, Denmark	
50 m butterfly	21.67	AM	Ilya Kharun	Canada	11 December 2024	World Championships	Budapest, Hungary	
100 m butterfly	47.68	WR	Joshua Liendo	Canada	23 October 2025	World Cup	Toronto, Canada	
200 m butterfly	1:48.24	AM	Ilya Kharun	Canada	12 December 2024	World Championships	Budapest, Hungary	
100 m individual medley	51.05	=, AF	Gerhard Zandberg	South Africa	15 November 2009	World Cup	Berlin, Germany	
100 m individual medley	51.05	=	Javier Acevedo	Canada	16 December 2022	World Championships	Melbourne, Australia	
100 m individual medley	51.05	=	Finlay Knox	Canada	23 October 2025	World Cup	Toronto, Canada	
200 m individual medley	1:50.15	AF	Matthew Sates	South Africa	13 December 2022	World Championships	Melbourne, Australia	
400 m individual medley	3:57.91	OC	Thomas Fraser-Holmes	Australia	28 November 2015	Australian Championships	Sydney, Australia	
4 × 50 m freestyle relay	1:23.44	OC	Isaac Cooper (21.25); Matthew Temple (20.75); Flynn Southam (21.10); Kyle Chalmers (20.34)	Australia	15 December 2022	World Championships	Melbourne, Australia	
4 × 100 m freestyle relay	3:04.63	OC	Flynn Southam (47.04); Matthew Temple (46.06); Thomas Neill (46.55); Kyle Chalmers (44.98)	Australia	13 December 2022	World Championships	Melbourne, Australia	
4 × 200 m freestyle relay	6:45.54	OC	Maximillian Giuliani (1:40.73); Edward Sommerville (1:41.03); Harrison Turner (1:42.21); Elijah Winnington (1:41.57)	Australia	13 December 2024	World Championships	Budapest, Hungary	
4 × 50 m medley relay	1:30.81	OC	Isaac Cooper (22.66); Grayson Bell (25.92); Matthew Temple (21.75); Kyle Chalmers (20.48)	Australia	17 December 2022	World Championships	Melbourne, Australia	
4 × 100 m medley relay	3:18.98	OC	Isaac Cooper (49.46); Joshua Yong (56.55); Matthew Temple (48.34); Kyle Chalmers (44.63)	Australia	18 December 2022	World Championships	Melbourne, Australia	

Legend: WR – World record; AF – African record; AM – Americas record; ER – European record; OC – Oceanian record; e – equalled existing record;
Records not set in finals: h – heat; sf – semifinal; r – relay 1st leg; rh – relay heat 1st leg; b – B final; † – en route to final mark; so – swim-off; tt – time trial

=== Women ===
Event	Time		Name	Nationality	Date	Meet	Location	Ref
50 m freestyle	23.04	OC	Emma McKeon	Australia	17 December 2022	World Championships	Melbourne, Australia	
100 m freestyle	50.25	OC	Cate Campbell	Australia	26 October 2017	Australian Championships	Adelaide, Australia	
200 m freestyle	1:49.36	WR	Mollie O'Callaghan	Australia	24 October 2025	World Cup	Toronto, Canada	
400 m freestyle	3:50.25	WR	Summer McIntosh	Canada	10 December 2024	World Championships	Budapest, Hungary	
800 m freestyle	7:54.00	WR	Lani Pallister	Australia	25 October 2025	World Cup	Toronto, Canada	
1500 m freestyle	15:13.83	OC	Lani Pallister	Australia	19 October 2025	World Cup	Westmont, United States	
50 m backstroke	25.25		Maggie MacNeil	Canada	16 December 2022	World Championships	Melbourne, Australia	
100 m backstroke	54.49	OC	Kaylee McKeown	Australia	24 October 2025	World Cup	Toronto, Canada	
200 m backstroke	1:57.33	WR	Kaylee McKeown	Australia	25 October 2025	World Cup	Toronto, Canada	
50 m breaststroke	28.56	AM	Alia Atkinson	Jamaica	6 October 2018	World Cup	Budapest, Hungary	
100 m breaststroke	1:02.36	=, WR	Alia Atkinson	Jamaica	6 December 2014	World Championships	Doha, Qatar	
100 m breaststroke	1:02.36	=, WR	Alia Atkinson	Jamaica	26 August 2016	World Cup	Chartres, France	
200 m breaststroke	2:15.42	OC	Leisel Jones	Australia	15 November 2009	World Cup	Berlin, Germany	
50 m butterfly	24.60	OC	Alexandria Perkins	Australia	18 October 2025	World Cup	Westmont, United States	
100 m butterfly	54.05		Maggie MacNeil	Canada	18 December 2022	World Championships	Melbourne, Australia	
200 m butterfly	1:59.32	WR	Summer McIntosh	Canada	12 December 2024	World Championships	Budapest, Hungary	
100 m individual medley	57.04		Mary-Sophie Harvey	Canada	13 December 2024	World Championships	Budapest, Hungary	
200 m individual medley	2:02.75		Abbie Wood	Great Britain	10 December 2024	World Championships	Budapest, Hungary	
400 m individual medley	4:15.48	WR	Summer McIntosh	Canada	14 December 2024	World Championships	Budapest, Hungary	
4 × 50 m freestyle relay	1:34.23	OC	Meg Harris (23.98); Madison Wilson (23.51); Mollie O'Callaghan (24.01); Emma McKeon (22.73)	Australia	15 December 2022	World Championships	Melbourne, Australia	
4 × 100 m freestyle relay	3:25.43	OC	Mollie O'Callaghan (52.19); Madison Wilson (51.28); Meg Harris (52.00); Emma McKeon (49.96)	Australia	13 December 2022	World Championships	Melbourne, Australia	
4 × 200 m freestyle relay	7:30.87	OC	Madison Wilson (1:53.13); Mollie O'Callaghan (1:52.83); Leah Neale (1:52.67); Lani Pallister (1:52.24)	Australia	14 December 2022	World Championships	Melbourne, Australia	
4 × 50 m medley relay	1:42.35	WR	Mollie O'Callaghan (25.49); Chelsea Hodges (29.11); Emma Mckeon (24.43); Madison Wilson (23.32)	Australia	17 December 2022	World Championships	Melbourne, Australia	
4 × 100 m medley relay	3:44.92	OC	Kaylee McKeown (55.74); Jenna Strauch (1:04.49); Emma Mckeon (53.93); Meg Harris (50.76)	Australia	18 December 2022	World Championships	Melbourne, Australia	

Legend: WR – World record; AF – African record; AM – Americas record; ER – European record; OC – Oceanian record; e – equalled existing record;
Records not set in finals: h – heat; sf – semifinal; r – relay 1st leg; rh – relay heat 1st leg; b – B final; † – en route to final mark; so – swim-off; tt – time trial

=== Mixed relay ===
Event	Time		Name	Nationality	Date	Meet	Location	Ref
4 × 50 m freestyle relay	1:28.03	OC	Kyle Chalmers (20.97); Matthew Temple (20.71); Meg Harris (23.73); Emma McKeon (22.62)	Australia	16 December 2022	World Championships	Melbourne, Australia	
4 × 50 m medley relay	1:35.94		Kylie Masse (25.87); Finlay Knox (25.53); Ilya Kharun (20.73); Ingrid Wilm (23.81)	Canada	11 December 2024	World Championships	Budapest, Hungary	
4 × 100 m medley relay	3:31.97		Ingrid Wilm (55.82); Finlay Knox (56.39); Ilya Kharun (48.27); Mary-Sophie Harvey (51.49)	Canada	14 December 2024	World Championships	Budapest, Hungary	

Legend: WR – World record; ER – European record; OC – Oceanian record; e – equalled existing record;
Records not set in finals: h – heat; so – swim-off
