= Para swimming classification =

Function-based classification system in Para swimming

Para swimming classification is a function-based classification system for Para swimming, designed to allow for fair competition. The classes are prefixed with "S" for freestyle, butterfly and backstroke events, "SB" for breaststroke and "SM" for individual medley events. Swimmers with physical disabilities are divided into ten classes based on their degree of functional disability: S1, S2, S3, S4, S5, S6, S7, S8, S9 and S10. The lower number indicates a greater degree of impairment. Those with visual impairments are placed in classes S11, S12 and S13. Class S15 is for athletes with hearing loss. Additional classes may be reserved for swimmers with intellectual impairment: S14, S18 for swimmers with Down Syndrome or class-S14 intellectual impairment combined with a physical impairment, and S19 for swimmers with autism.

Swimming was one of the first organised sports for people with disabilities, and was contested at the first Summer Paralympics in 1960. Both the rules for the sport and approval of classifications were the responsibility of the Fédération International de Natation Amateur (FINA) until 1992, when the International Paralympic Committee took over the governance of classification. As of 2012, people with visual, physical and intellectual disabilities are eligible to compete in the sport. The classification system was originally based on medical criteria, but has since moved to one largely based on functional disability to make Para swimming more competitive. The sport is moving towards an evidence-based classification system.

== Definition ==
Para-swimming classification is based on a system in which functional criteria are assessed. Athletes who have different physical disabilities may compete in the same class so long as their functional impairments are similar. In swimming, amputations of the arms below the elbow have a significant impact on functional ability. As a result, swimming classifications differ from athletics classifications. Swimmers are divided into ten classes based on degree of functional disability: S1, S2, S3, S4, S5, S6, S7, S8, S9 and S10. The most severely affected are in class S1; these swimmers normally use wheelchairs outside of the pool. Classes are prefixed with the letter "S" for freestyle, butterfly and backstroke events, while those prefixed with "SB" are for breaststroke, and those with "SM" for individual medley events. This is because different strokes require the use of different muscle groups. In the case of the breaststroke, for example, the hand and the hip play a crucial role. Because of this, a swimmer may compete in one class for one stroke and a different class for another. It also means that swimmers with cerebral palsy, spinal cord injuries and limb deficiencies may compete against each other. For the individual medley, the class assigned is the mean average of the classes assigned for each individual stroke (rounded to the nearest whole number with .5 rounding up).

There are three additional classes, S11, S12 and S13, for visually impaired swimmers. The lower number indicates a greater degree of impairment: class S11 swimmers are blind or nearly blind, and compete in blacked-out goggles. They each have a "tapper" who uses a pole or "bonker" to warn the swimmer that they are approaching the end of the pool. The visual classifications are based on medical classification, and not on functional mobility. One more class, S14, is for intellectually disabled swimmers. This class was not contested at the 2004 and the 2008 Summer Paralympics after the International Paralympic Committee (IPC) dropped all intellectual disability events following the basketball ID controversy at the 2000 Summer Paralympics, but was restored for the 2012 Summer Paralympics.

The general rules for Paralympic swimming are based on those intended for able-bodied competitors. The rules regarding strokes, turns and the length of time that swimmers may remain under water are similar to those for the Olympic Games. Events take place in a standard 50m pool. Swimmers may dive in or start in the water. Swimmers may not use any assistive technology while competing.

A final class, S15, is for athletes with hearing loss.

=== Gallery ===
Visualisation of functional mobility for a S1 competitor

Visualisation of functional mobility for a S2 competitor

Visualisation of functional mobility for a S3 competitor

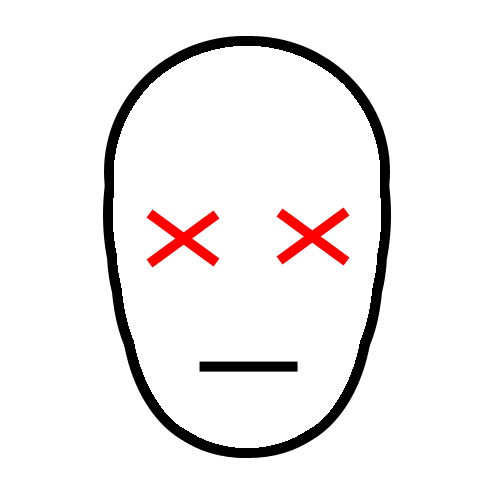
Visualisation of functional vision for a S11 competitor

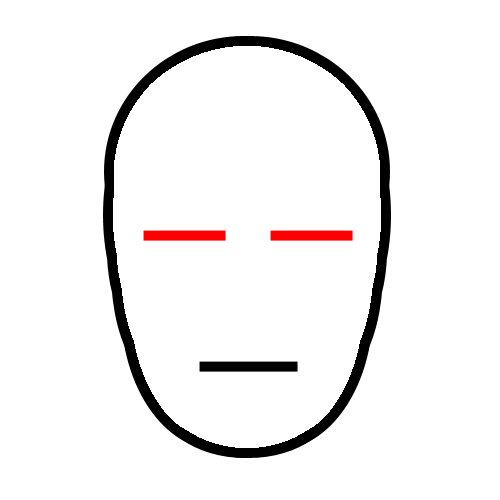
Visualisation of functional vision for a S12 competitor

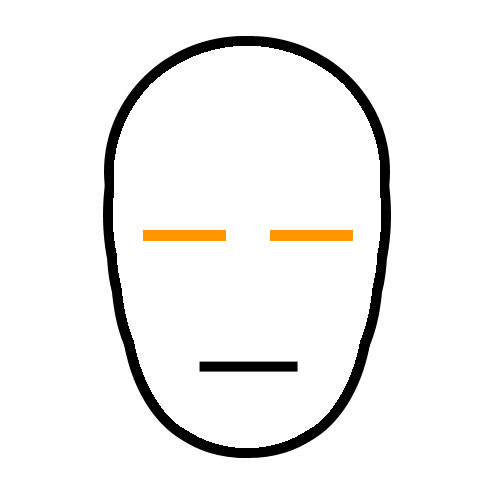
Visualisation of functional vision for a S13 competitor

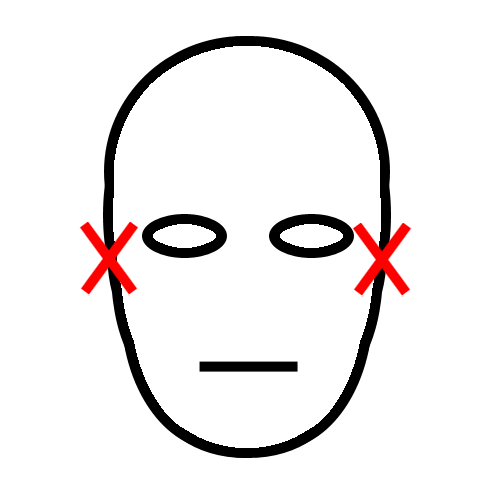
Visualisation of functional hearing for a S15 competitor

== Governance ==
Swimming was one of the eight sports contested in the first Paralympics, the 1960 Summer Paralympics in Rome. Both the rules for the sport and for the approval of swimmers' classifications were set by the Fédération International de Natation Amateur (FINA). In 1992, the IPC formally became the governing body for disability swimming. Four different sporting bodies, the International Blind Sports Federation (IBSA), International Sports Federation of the Disabled (ISOD), International Wheelchair and Amputee Sports Federation (ISMWSF) and the Cerebral Palsy International Sports and Recreation Association (CP-ISRA), assisted the IPC in governing swimming at the 1992 Summer Paralympics. The IPC Classification Code and IPC Swimming govern the classification process. Classification of swimmers is performed by classifiers that are recognised by the IPC.

== History ==
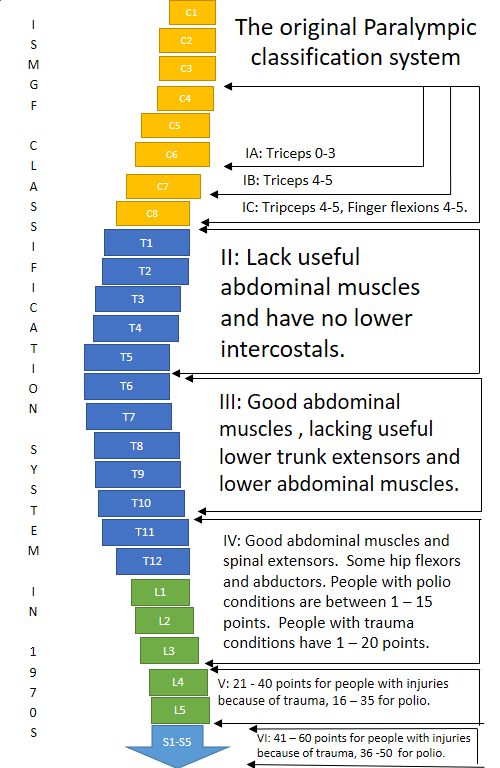
The original ISMGF classification system used at early Paralympic Games

The earliest classification system for Para swimming was created during the 1940s. At this time, swimmers were classified based on their medical conditions. During the late 1960s and early 1970s, the classification system was set up as a series of "handicaps". In an effort to clearly describe disabilities and promote fairness, the number of classifications ballooned. This made organizing competitive events difficult as there were too few people in each classification; international events for people with disabilities were said to have as many winners as competitors. At the 1988 Summer Paralympics in Seoul, the number of eligible classes was so great that 60 gold medals were awarded in one swimming event.

During the 1960s and 1970s, classification involved being examined in a supine position on an examination table, where multiple medical classifiers would often stand around the player, poke and prod their muscles with their hands and with pins. The system had no built-in privacy safeguards and players being classified were not ensured privacy during medical classification nor with their medical records.

During the 1960s and 1970s, ISMGF classification cheating occurred in both swimming and wheelchair basketball. Some of the medical classifications appeared arbitrary, with people of different functional levels being put into the same class. This made the results for many games and swimming races appear to be completely arbitrary. Impacted sportspeople were starting to demand that changes be made to address this.

In 1974, the Disabled of the German State of North Rhine-Westphalia (BSNW) developed a swimming classification system that stayed in use until 1982. This system had seven classifications. There was a CP class for athletes with hemispasticity who would also compete in the same class against competitors who were single arm above the elbow amputees, had double-arm dysmelia type ectromelia, had single arm paralysis or had a fixed shoulder joint. There was an intellectual disability class called Class J, and a Class H for people with severe disabilities. BSNW classification events included swimming races from 50 to 1500 metres. The system was later expanded to include nine classes before it was discontinued. The BSNW system did not gain international support, and only was used inside Germany. It was discarded because of a need to have athletes classified for international competitions.

In 1983, classification for swimmers with cerebral palsy was governed by CP-ISRA. There were five cerebral palsy classifications. Class 1 competitors could compete in the 25 metre freestyle event with flotation devices with or without flotation devices. Class 2 competitors could compete in the same events, but only against class 2 competitors. That year, 80 to 85 per cent of all competitors with cerebral palsy competed in the same classification in international competitions.

Classification for swimming relied on a points system to assess the severity of physical disability without considering athlete functionality specifically as it applied to the ability to swim a particular stroke. This caused problems because certain types of disability had a greater negative impact on swimming than others, and the point system did not directly address functional ability. To address this, in 1990 point consideration was eliminated for disability types that did not impact performance. The IPC decided to reduce the number of classifications, and to try to fix classification so that competitors could have more certainty in which classification they would compete in before attending an event. This was a major change, as previously, athletes would be classified immediately before, and even during, an event. As a result, the number of swimming classifications dropped from 31 at Seoul in 1988 to 10 at the 1992 Summer Paralympics in Barcelona.

Going into the 1992 Summer Paralympics, the International Coordinating Committee and the Technical Committee of the IPC push for a move towards a functional classification system. This came to a head at the November 1989 meeting of the Barcelona Olympics Organising Committee (Comite Organitzador Olimpic Barcelona - COOB), when a discussion started about what events and classifications should be eligible for the Games. A study by the organising committee and the Polytechnic University of Catalonia in the lead-up to the meeting looked at the results of recent international competitions. It proposed a series of classes, based on the competitive results, for use in Barcelona. COOB insisted that such a system be implemented to ensure the sport at the Paralympic Games was serious and competitive, instead of recreational. The suggestions were implemented for sports such as swimming and athletics. The Games were the first ones where swimmers of different types of disabilities competed against each other, swimmers had a guaranteed right to appeal their classification.

The move to functional classification coincided with the rise of sports science. The first detailed international swimming sport science project was conducted at the 1988 Summer Olympics in Seoul. This was followed by a similar project at the 1992 Summer Paralympics in Barcelona. These studies provided an increasingly detailed understanding of the factors involved in high performance swimming. Henceforth sports science became the driver of both performance and classification.

Ahead of the 2000 Summer Paralympics in Sydney, changes were made in classification for the breaststroke, bringing the total number of functional classifications down from ten that had competed in Atlanta to nine. Swimmers who had been classified as SB10 at the 1996 Summer Paralympics in Atlanta opted not to compete in Sydney. Several former SB8 and SB9 swimmers moved down a class to compete, and made the finals in their classifications. The IPC's Olympian aspiration to become a premier elite international sporting competition still fell short. In Sydney, 561 gold medals were awarded in 18 sports, compared with 300 in 28 sports at the 2000 Summer Olympics.

== Classification process ==
During the classification process, classifiers evaluate factors including whether a swimmer's physical limitations require him or her to start in the water, and how the swimmer enters the water in competition. A two-person panel that includes at least one person with a medical background handles classification at international competitions. Classifiers are required to be familiar with the type of disability they are classifying, whether physical, visual or intellectual. Classification by national sports bodies mirrors the international classification process, conducted by nationally recognised IPC classifiers. For Australian competitors, for example, classification is managed by the national sport federation, Swimming Australia, with support from the Australian Paralympic Committee. There are three types of classification available for Australian competitors: provisional, national and international. The first is for club-level competitions, the second for state and national competitions, and the third for international competitions.

Internationally, all classification is handled in English but athletes are allowed to have an interpreter present during the process. Swimmers are required to disclose any medications they regularly use, and provide detailed records of their medical history if a classifier deems them relevant. They are allowed to have someone familiar with their swimming limitations present during the process. The process includes a physical assessment, observation assessment, and a functional assessment that may include performance in the pool. Swimmers with visual impairment do not require the functional and observational components of assessment. If a swimmer intentionally misrepresents his or her disability, he or she is barred from the classification process for a minimum of two years, and is unable to compete.

If swimmers do not agree with their classifications, they can appeal through the IPC Board of Appeal on Classification, which is the body recognised by IPC Swimming. Formal processes exist for how to do this in both non-competition and competition periods. Classification assessment took roughly 30 to 45 minutes at the 1996 Summer Paralympics. Classification for blind swimmers only lasted about 15 minutes.

== Classification at the Paralympics ==
All disability types were eligible to participate at the 1992 Summer Paralympics. The IPC oversaw classification based on functional disability. General and functional classification took place in the Paralympic Village, with functional swimming classification taking place on the same dates at the Piscines Bernat Picronell. The process became a contentious issue at the Paralympics because of on-the-spot reclassifications that resulted in changes to the competition schedule. On-the-spot classification or re-classification was viewed as a negative aspect of the 1996 Summer Paralympics, and the Paralympic movement overall. At the 2000 Summer Paralympics, 54 assessments were conducted, resulting in 13 class changes. There was one Paralympic New Status (PNS) protest and two Paralympic Permanent Status (PPS) protests by a national Paralympic committee, with one classification upheld and two denied. Six classification appeals were lodged for swimming at the 2000 Summer Paralympics involving four athletes, resulting in two class changes. For the 2016 Summer Paralympics in Rio de Janeiro, the IPC had a zero classification at the Games policy. This policy was put into place in 2014, with the goal of avoiding last minute changes in classes that would negatively impact athlete training preparations. All competitors needed to be internationally classified with their classification status confirmed prior to the Games, with exceptions to this policy being dealt with on a case-by-case basis. In case there was a need for classification or reclassification at the Games despite best efforts otherwise, swimming classification was scheduled to take place at the Olympic Aquatics Stadium, with visually impaired swimmers getting classified from September 4 to 6 and all other swimmers being classified from September 3 to 5. For sportspeople with physical or intellectual disabilities going through classification or reclassification in Rio de Janeiro, their in-competition observation event is their first appearance in competition at the Games.

== Future ==
Disability sport's major classification body, the IPC, is working on improving classification to be more of an evidence-based system, as opposed to a performance-based system, so as not to punish elite athletes whose performance makes them appear in a higher class compared to competitors who train less.
