= Swimming at the 2026 Commonwealth Games – Men's 4 × 100 metre medley relay =

Men's 4 × 100 metre medley relay at the 2026 Commonwealth Games
- Venue: Tollcross International Swimming Centre
- Dates: 29 July
- Winning time: 3:28.71 GR

Medalists
gold medal	Henry Allan; Samuel Williamson; Matthew Temple; Flynn Southam; Isaac Cooper*; Zac Stubblety-Cook*; Ben Armbruster*; Jamie Jack*	Australia
silver medal	Oliver Morgan; Adam Ramsay-Peaty; Edward Mildred; Jacob Mills; Luke Greenbank*; Gregory Butler*; Jacob Peters*; Jacob Whittle*	England
bronze medal	Pieter Coetze; Michael Houlie; Chad le Clos; Ruard van Renen; Chris Smith*; Jarden Eaton*; Guy Brooks*	South Africa

The men's 4 × 100 metre medley relay event at the 2026 Commonwealth Games will be held on 29 July at the Tollcross International Swimming Centre.

== Schedule ==
The schedule is as follows:

All times are British Summer Time (UTC+1)

Date	Time	Round
Wednesday 29 July 2026	10:30	Heats
Wednesday 29 July 2026	19:00	Final

== Results ==
=== Heats ===
The heats was held on the morning of 29 July 2026.

Heat results
Rank	Heat	Lane	Nation	Swimmers	Time	Notes
1	2	5	Australia	Isaac Cooper (55.00); Zac Stubblety-Cook (1:00.30); Ben Armbruster (51.23); Jamie Jack (48.14)	3:34.67	Q
2	1	4	England	Luke Greenbank (54.51); Gregory Butler (59.78); Jacob Peters (52.64); Jacob Whittle (48.91)	3:35.84	Q
3	2	6	South Africa	Ruard van Renen (55.99); Chris Smith (1:01.92); Jarden Eaton (52.84); Guy Brooks (48.23)	3:38.98	Q
4	2	4	Canada	Benjamin Winterborn (55.47); Oliver Dawson (1:00.02); Benjamin Loewen (53.80); Lorne Wigginton (50.53)	3:39.82	Q
5	1	5	Scotland	Jamie Ferguson (55.64); Joshua Mitchell (1:01.82); Evan Jones (53.26); Jensen Norris (49.58)	3:40.30	Q
6	2	3	Northern Ireland	Patrick Johnston (55.79); Adam Bradley (1:02.68); Matthew Hamilton (53.39); Jack McMillan (49.20)	3:41.06	Q
7	1	3	Wales	Jack Knight (56.92); Kyle Booth (1:02.36); Harry Milne (54.51); Dan Jones (49.58)	3:43.37	Q
8	2	1	Namibia	Oliver Durand (57.64); Ronan Wantenaar (1:01.43); José Canjulo (55.24); Luke Beukes (50.30)	3:44.61	Q
9	1	6	Jersey	Isaac Thompson (58.31); Filip Nowacki (58.85); Isaac Dodds (56.05); Samuel Sterry (52.12)	3:45.33	R
10	1	1	Uganda	Tendo Kaumi (57.27); Jordan Ssamula (1:08.35); Jesse Ssengonzi (54.22); Tendo Mukalazi (52.18)	3:52.02	R
11	2	2	Isle of Man	Charles Foster (59.59); Alexander Turnbull (1:06.73); Peter Allen (56.21); Joel Watterson (51.21)	3:53.74	
12	1	7	Cayman Islands	Luke Higgo (58.93); Will Sellars (1:10.34); Danny Kish (54.71); Connor MacDonald (55.68)	3:59.66	
13	1	2	Fiji	Reuben Taylor (1:06.96); Samuel Yalimaiwai (1:05.68); Hansel McCaig (57.84); David Young (52.29)	4:02.77	
	2	7	Guernsey	Zachary Maiden (1:04.48); Charlie-Joe Hallett (1:05.08); Ronny Hallett (1:00.98); Henry Bolton		DQ
	2	8	Seychelles			DNS

=== Final ===
The final will take place during of the evening of 29 July 2026.

Final results
Rank	Lane	Nation	Swimmers	Time	Notes
1st place, gold medalist(s)	4	Australia	Henry Allan (53.58); Sam Williamson (58.40); Matthew Temple (50.18); Flynn Southam (46.55)	3:28.71	GR
2nd place, silver medalist(s)	5	England	Oliver Morgan (53.20); Adam Ramsay-Peaty (58.74); Edward Mildred (51.04); Jacob Mills (47.70)	3:30.68	
3rd place, bronze medalist(s)	3	South Africa	Pieter Coetze (51.71); Michael Houlie (59.41); Chad le Clos (51.27); Ruard van Renen (48.74)	3:31.13	AF
4	6	Canada	Benjamin Winterborn (55.13); Oliver Dawson (59.86); Joshua Liendo (50.19); Antoine Sauve (48.38)	3:33.56	
5	2	Scotland	Matthew Ward (53.73); Archie Goodburn (1:00.25); Dean Fearn (52.31); Duncan Scott (48.38)	3:34.67	
6	7	Northern Ireland	Patrick Johnston(55.67); Adam Bradley (1:00.80); Matthew Hamilton (52.45); Jack McMillan (48.66)	3:37.58	
7	1	Wales	Jack Knight (56.01); Josh Inglis (1:01.92); Lewis Fraser (52.67); Harry Milne (48.32)	3:38.92	
8	8	Namibia	Oliver Durand (56.87); Ronan Wantenaar (1:02.38); Jose Canjulo (55.55); Luke Beukes (49.78)	3:44.58	
