= S15 (classification) =

Para-swimming classification

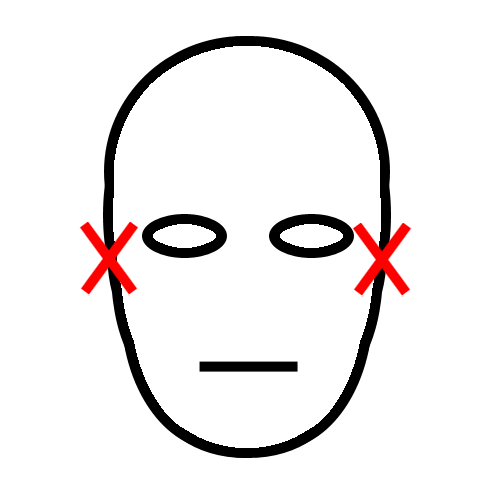
Visualisation of disability for this swimming classification

S15, SB15, SM15 are Para swimming classifications used for categorising swimmers based on their level of disability. These classifications are for athletes with hearing loss.

== Definition ==
The S15, SB15 and SM15 classifications are for people with hearing loss.

The classification was created by the International Paralympic Committee. In 2003 the committee approved a plan which recommended the development of a universal classification code. The code was approved in 2007, and defines the "objective of classification as developing and implementing accurate, reliable and consistent sport focused classification systems", which are known as "evidence based, sport specific classification". In November 2015, they approved the revised classification code, which "aims to further develop evidence based, sport specific classification in all sports".

In Australia, to be classified in this category, athletes contact the Australian Paralympic Committee or their state swimming governing body.

== See also ==
- Para swimming classification
- Swimming at the Summer Paralympics
