= Beau Matthews =

Australian Paralympic swimmer

Personal information
- Full name: Beau R. Matthews
- Nationality: Australian
- Born: 2009 (age 16–17) New South Wales
- Education: Inaburra School (2015–2025)
- Height: 5 ft 8 in (172 cm)

Sport
- Sport: Paralympic swimming
- Disability: Cerebral palsy
- Disability class: S9, SB9
- Club: Aquablitz Toongabbie Swim Club
- Coached by: Gavin Stewart
Medal record
Men's para swimming
Representing Australia
Commonwealth Games
Gold medal – first place	2026 Glasgow	100 m breaststroke SB9

Beau Matthews (born 2009) is an Australian Paralympic swimmer who competes in the S10, SB9, and SM10 classifications. Specialising in breaststroke and individual medley events, Matthews represents Australia in international competition and trains at the Aquablitz Toongabbie Swim Club under coach Gavin Stewart. He made his senior Australian team debut after being selected for the 2026 Commonwealth Games in Glasgow.

== Career ==
In June 2026, he competed at the 2026 Australian Swimming Trials and qualified to represent Australia at the 2026 Commonwealth Games. He was also named to the Pan Pacific Para Swimming Championships team. Beau trains with the NSW Institute of Sport (NSWIS) and has progressed rapidly through Australia's Para swimming pathway. During the Commonwealth Games, he won a gold medal in the 100 metre breaststroke SB9 event with a time of 1:09.41.

== Personal life ==
Matthews was born with cerebral palsy. When he was very young, doctors warned his family that he might never walk, talk, or live independently. His parents, particularly his mother, refused to accept those predictions and spent years helping him build strength and mobility through therapy and physical activity. Swimming eventually became both rehabilitation and a pathway to elite sport. Matthews went to school at Inaburra School in Bangor NSW. Nicknamed the "Running Man" by friends and coaches, Matthews received this nickname from his signature warm up jog-on-the-spot prior to starting a race.

== Other Qualifications ==
Matthews competes in the following Para swimming classifications: - S10 – Freestyle, backstroke and butterfly - SB9 – Breaststroke - SM10 – Individual medley
