= 2024 World Aquatics Swimming Championships (25 m) – Men's 50 metre backstroke =

Swimming competition

Men's 50 metre backstroke at the 2024 World Aquatics Swimming Championships (25 m)
- Venue: Duna Arena
- Location: Budapest, Hungary
- Dates: 12 December (heats and semifinals); 13 December (final)
- Competitors: 51 from 45 nations
- Winning time: 22.47 WJ

Medalists
gold medal	Miron Lifintsev
silver medal	Isaac Cooper	Australia
bronze medal	Shane Ryan	Ireland

The men's 50 metre backstroke event at the 2024 World Aquatics Swimming Championships (25 m) was held from 12 to 13 December 2024 at the Duna Arena in Budapest, Hungary.

== Records ==
Prior to the competition, the existing world and championship records were as follows.

World record	Kliment Kolesnikov (RUS)	22.11	Kazan, Russia	23 November 2022
Competition record	Florent Manaudou (FRA)	22.22	Doha, Qatar	6 December 2014

== Background ==
With defending champion Ryan Murphy absent, Australia’s Isaac Cooper entered the event as the top seed. Cooper, the reigning long course world champion, won silver at the 2022 Short Course World Championships and led the world rankings in 2024 with a 22.58 from the World Cup in Shanghai. Pieter Coetze (22.75) and Kliment Kolesnikov (22.78), who ranked second and third globally in the season so far, were not competing. Russian teenager Miron Lifintsev, competing as a neutral athlete, recorded a 22.79 at the Russian Championships and was considered a strong medal contender. Italy’s Lorenzo Mora entered with a season best of 22.89 and a lifetime best of 22.65 from the 2022 Worlds, where he placed fourth. France’s Mewen Tomac (22.84) and Japan’s Kaiya Seki (22.85) were also entered with sub-23 performances. Other contenders included Hungary’s Hubert Kós, Poland’s Kacper Stokowski (23.05), Trinidad and Tobago's Dylan Carter, and the USA's Michael Andrew.

SwimSwam predicted Cooper would win, Lifintsev would finish second, and Mora would finish third.

== Results ==
=== Heats ===
The heats were started on 12 December at 9:17.

Rank	Heat	Lane	Name	Nationality	Time	Notes
1	5	4	Miron Lifintsev	Neutral Athletes B	22.87	Q
2	6	3	Kacper Stokowski	Poland	22.89	Q
3	5	6	Shane Ryan	Ireland	22.98	Q
4	6	4	Isaac Cooper	Australia	23.01	Q
5	4	2	Pavel Samusenko	Neutral Athletes B	23.02	Q
6	3	5	Hubert Kós	Hungary	23.05	Q, NR
7	4	6	Ralf Tribuntsov	Estonia	23.06	Q, NR
8	5	2	Guilherme Basseto	Brazil	23.11	Q
9	6	7	Miroslav Knedla	Czech Republic	23.13	Q, NR
10	4	3	Marius Kusch	Germany	23.28	Q
11	4	7	Ruard van Renen	South Africa	23.29	Q
11	6	6	Thierry Bollin	Switzerland	23.29	Q
13	4	4	Mewen Tomac	France	23.32	Q
14	4	5	Ole Braunschweig	Germany	23.33	Q
15	2	5	Finlay Knox	Canada	23.35	Q
16	3	3	Yohann Ndoye-Brouard	France	23.37	QSO
16	5	9	Mantas Kaušpėdas	Lithuania	23.37	QSO, NR
18	6	5	Kaiya Seki	Japan	23.41	R
19	5	1	Denis Popescu	Romania	23.44	
20	5	5	Lorenzo Mora	Italy	23.45	
21	3	1	Lamar Taylor	Bahamas	23.51	NR
21	5	3	Masaki Yura	Japan	23.51	
21	6	0	Cooper Morley	New Zealand	23.51	
24	5	7	Iván Martínez	Spain	23.61	
25	6	1	Oliver Morgan	Great Britain	23.64	
26	6	8	Grigori Pekarski	Neutral Athletes A	23.66	
27	4	0	Ksawery Masiuk	Poland	23.69	
28	5	8	Simon Bucher	Austria	23.70	
29	4	1	Markus Lie	Norway	23.76	
30	2	3	Maximillian Wilson	United States Virgin Islands	23.81	NR
31	5	0	Dino Hasibović Sirotanović	Bosnia and Herzegovina	23.84	
32	3	7	Ulises Saravia	Argentina	23.91	
33	4	9	Evangelos Makrygiannis	Greece	23.95	
34	3	2	Ádám Jászó	Hungary	23.98	
35	3	6	Oleksandr Zheltiakov	Ukraine	23.99	
36	4	8	Xu Yifan	China	24.01	
37	3	8	Mert Ali Satır	Turkey	24.02	
38	2	2	Samuel Törnqvist	Sweden	24.05	
39	3	0	Chuang Mu-lun	Chinese Taipei	24.28	
40	2	4	Noe Pantskhava	Georgia	24.29	NR
40	3	4	Jason Mahmutoglu	Philippines	24.29	NR
42	2	7	Ģirts Feldbergs	Latvia	24.55	
43	2	8	Mikhail Kleshko	Uzbekistan	24.64	NR
43	3	9	Meiron Amir Cheruti	Israel	24.64	
45	2	1	Charles Hockin	Paraguay	24.76	
46	1	2	Akash Mani	India	24.87	
47	2	0	Mohamad Zubaid	Kuwait	25.06	NR
48	2	9	Samiul Islam Rafi	Bangladesh	25.09	NR
49	2	6	Kokoro Frost	Samoa	25.58	NR
50	1	5	Tendo Kaumi	Uganda	27.30	NR
51	1	4	Amos Ferley	Seychelles	27.35	
	1	6	Fahim Anwari	Afghanistan	Did not start	
	1	7	Joash McKonie	Zimbabwe	Did not start	
	6	2	Dylan Carter	Trinidad and Tobago	Did not start	
	6	9	Michael Andrew	United States	Did not start	

=== Swim-off ===
The swim-off was held on 12 December at 11:45.

Rank	Lane	Name	Nationality	Time	Notes
1	5	Mantas Kaušpėdas	Lithuania	22.91	Q, NR
2	4	Yohann Ndoye-Brouard	France	23.27	

=== Semifinals ===
The semifinals were started on 12 December at 17:57.

Rank	Heat	Lane	Name	Nationality	Time	Notes
1	2	4	Miron Lifintsev	Neutral Athletes B	22.70	Q
2	2	3	Pavel Samusenko	Neutral Athletes B	22.72	Q
3	1	4	Kacper Stokowski	Poland	22.73	Q, NR
3	1	7	Thierry Bollin	Switzerland	22.73	Q, NR
5	2	2	Miroslav Knedla	Czech Republic	22.74	Q, NR
6	1	5	Isaac Cooper	Australia	22.79	Q
7	1	3	Hubert Kós	Hungary	22.85	Q, NR
8	2	5	Shane Ryan	Ireland	22.89	Q
9	2	8	Finlay Knox	Canada	23.03	R, NR
10	2	1	Mewen Tomac	France	23.06	R
11	1	8	Mantas Kaušpėdas	Lithuania	23.09	
12	2	7	Ruard van Renen	South Africa	23.21	
13	2	6	Ralf Tribuntsov	Estonia	23.23	
14	1	6	Guilherme Basseto	Brazil	23.30	
15	1	1	Ole Braunschweig	Germany	23.48	
16	1	2	Marius Kusch	Germany	23.55	

=== Final ===
The final was started on 13 December at 18:12.

Rank	Lane	Name	Nationality	Time	Notes
1st place, gold medalist(s)	4	Miron Lifintsev	Neutral Athletes B	22.47	WJ
2nd place, silver medalist(s)	7	Isaac Cooper	Australia	22.49	OC
3rd place, bronze medalist(s)	8	Shane Ryan	Ireland	22.56	NR
4	1	Hubert Kós	Hungary	22.64	NR
5	3	Kacper Stokowski	Poland	22.68	NR
6	5	Pavel Samusenko	Neutral Athletes B	22.74	
7	2	Miroslav Knedla	Czech Republic	22.89	
8	6	Thierry Bollin	Switzerland	22.97	
