= Isaac Cooper =

Australian swimmer (born 2004)

Personal information
- Full name: Isaac Alan Cooper
- Nationality: Australian
- Born: 7 January 2004 (age 22) Bundaberg, Queensland, Australia

Sport
- Sport: Swimming
- Strokes: Backstroke
Medal record
Representing Australia
Olympic Games
Bronze medal – third place	2020 Tokyo	4×100 m mixed medley
World Championships (LC)
Gold medal – first place	2024 Doha	50 m backstroke
Silver medal – second place	2022 Budapest	4×100 m mixed medley
World Championships (SC)
Gold medal – first place	2022 Melbourne	4×50 m freestyle
Gold medal – first place	2022 Melbourne	4×100 m medley
Silver medal – second place	2022 Melbourne	50 m backstroke
Silver medal – second place	2024 Budapest	50 m backstroke
Bronze medal – third place	2022 Melbourne	100 m backstroke
Bronze medal – third place	2022 Melbourne	4×50 m medley
Commonwealth Games
Gold medal – first place	2026 Glasgow	4×100 m medley
Pan Pacific Championships
Silver medal – second place	2026 Irvine	50 m backstroke

Isaac Cooper (born 7 January 2004) is an Australian swimmer.

At the 2020 Summer Olympics, he won a bronze medal in the mixed 4 × 100 m medley relay. At the 2022 World Championships (25 m), he won two gold medals, and broke the world record in the 4 × 100 m medley relay. He won the 50 m backstroke at the 2024 World Championships. He holds the Australian record in the 50 m backstroke.

In July 2022, Cooper was removed from the Australian team for the 2022 Commonwealth Games due to "wellbeing challenges, including the use of medication". In August 2026, he stepped down from a leadership position on the Australian team, after he skipped a swimming session at the 2026 Commonwealth Games to go out drinking.

== Career ==
=== 2021–2022 ===
In July 2021, Cooper competed at the Olympics in Tokyo. He finished twelfth in the 100 m backstroke in a personal best time of 53.43. He then competed in the heats of the mixed 4 × 100 m medley relay. He was replaced by Kaylee McKeown in the final, where Australia won the bronze medal.

In May 2022, Cooper competed at the Australian Championships in Adelaide. He went 24.44 in the 50 m backstroke, breaking the Australian record of 24.54 set by Ben Treffers in 2014.

In June 2022, Cooper competed at the World Championships in Budapest. He finished twelfth in the 100 m backstroke in a time of 53.55. He swam in the heats of the mixed 4 × 100 m medley relay and was replaced by McKeown in the final; Australia eventually won the silver medal. Cooper finished eighth in the 50 m backstroke in a time of 24.76. He swam the backstroke leg of the men's 4 × 100 m medley relay, splitting 54.29; Australia finished fourth in a time of 3:31.81.

In December 2022, Cooper competed at the World Championships (25 m) in Melbourne. His first event was the 100 m backstroke, where he won the bronze medal in a personal best time of 49.52. He then competed in the 50 m backstroke. He went 22.79 in the heats, breaking the Australian record of 22.91 set by Mitch Larkin in 2015. In the semifinals, Cooper lowered the mark to 22.52, also breaking the world junior record. He then swam in the men's 4 × 50 m freestyle relay, splitting 21.25 on the first leg. Australia won the gold medal in an Oceanian record time of 1:23.44. The following day, Cooper swam in the 50 m backstroke final, which he appeared to win in a time of 22.49, however, due to a technical error, the results were not made official. The final was rescheduled; Cooper ultimately won the silver medal in a time of 22.73. He then swam the backstroke leg of the 4 × 50 m medley relay, splitting 22.66; Australia won the bronze medal in a time of 1:30.81. In his final event of the competition, Cooper swam the backstroke leg of the 4 × 100 m medley relay, recording a personal best time of 49.46. Australia tied with the US for the gold medal, recording a time of 3:18.98 to break Russia's world record of 3:19.16 from 2009.

=== 2023–2026 ===
In March 2023, Cooper competed at the New South Wales Championships in Sydney, where he went 24.38 to set a new Australian record in the 50 m backstroke.

In July 2023, Cooper competed at the World Championships in Fukuoka. His first event was the 100 m backstroke, where he finished seventeenth in a time of 53.95. He then competed in the 50 m freestyle. He finished fourth in the final in a time of 21.70. He then finished ninth in the 50 m backstroke in a time of 24.86.

In February 2024, Cooper competed at the World Championships in Doha. He finished fourth in the 50 m butterfly in a time of 23.12. He then swam in the 50 m freestyle, finishing fifth in a time of 21.77. His final event was the 50 m backstroke. He set an Australian record of 24.12 in the semifinals, then in the final, won the gold medal in a time of 24.13.

In July 2024, Cooper competed at the Olympics in Paris. In the 100 m backstroke, he went 54.21, tying with the Netherlands' Kai van Westering for twenty-first place.

In December 2024, Cooper competed at the World Championships (25 m) in Budapest. He finished twenty-first in the 50 m butterfly in a time of 22.66. Cooper swam in the 100 m backstroke, finishing seventh in a time of 49.60. He then swam the backstroke leg of the mixed 4 × 50 m medley relay, splitting 22.68 on the backstroke leg; Australia finished fourth in a Oceanian record time of 1:36.78. Cooper then swam in the 50 m backstroke, winning the silver medal in an Australian record time of 22.49. His final event was the 4 × 100 m medley relay, in which he split 49.81 on the backstroke leg; Australia finished sixth in a time of 3:22.03.

In August 2025, Cooper competed at the World Championships in Singapore. He finished seventh in the 50 m backstroke in a time of 24.61.

In July 2026, Cooper competed at the Commonwealth Games in Glasgow. In the 50 m backstroke, he finished sixth in a time of 24.73. He then swam in the 100 m backstroke, where in the semifinals, he went 54.58 to qualify eighth-fastest for the final; he later withdrew from the final. 4 × 100 m medley relay, in which he swam the backstroke leg. He split 55.00 in the heats and was replaced in the final; Australia eventually won the gold medal.

== Controversies ==
In July 2022, Cooper was sent home from a training camp in France due to "wellbeing challenges, including the use of medication", thereby missing the 2022 Commonwealth Games in Birmingham. Following the dismissal, he left Rackley Centenary after the club "had no alternative but to part ways" with him. Cooper subsequently started training with Ashley Delaney at St Andrews Anglican College.

In August 2026, Cooper stepped down from his leadership role on the Australian team, after he skipped the final session of swimming at the 2026 Commonwealth Games to go out drinking; he also missed a team meeting. Swimming Australia requires athletes to attend all swimming sessions.

== World records ==
=== Short course metres ===
No.	Event	Time	Meet	Location	Date	Status	Ref
1	4x100 m medley relay^{[a]}	3:18.98	2022 World Championships (25 m)	Melbourne, Australia	18 December 2022	Former	

^{a} split 49.46 (backstroke leg); with Joshua Yong (breaststroke leg), Matthew Temple (butterfly leg), Kyle Chalmers (freestyle leg)
