= 2026 Pan Pacific Swimming Championships – Men's 100 metre backstroke =

Men's 100 metre backstroke at the 2026 Pan Pacific Swimming Championships
- Venue: William Woollett Jr. Aquatics Center
- Dates: August 12
- Competitors: 19 from 10 nations
- Winning time: 53.18

Medalists
| gold medal | Blake Tierney | Canada |
| silver medal | Will Modglin | United States |
| bronze medal | Jack Aikins | United States |

Official Video (heats)

Official Video (B and A final)

The men's 100 metre backstroke event at the 2026 Pan Pacific Swimming Championships was held on August 12 at the William Woollett Jr. Aquatics Center in Irvine, California. The event was won by Canada's Blake Tierney in a time of 53.18, ahead of American Will Modglin, who claimed the silver medal in 53.37. Modglin's compatriot Jack Aikins won the bronze medal in 53.46, while Mexico's Marcus Reyes-Gentry finished fourth in 54.04.

Earlier in the morning heats, Tierney recorded the fastest qualifying time of 53.13, narrowly ahead of Modglin, who finished in 53.17. Bermuda's Jack Harvey was the only swimmer advancing to the A final to establish a new personal best, lowering his own Bermudian national record by 0.05 seconds to 54.51. South Africa's Michael van Heerden qualified as the sole reserve for the finals, while his compatriot Matthew Mann, who finished 18th overall in 58.29, was ineligible for a reserve position due to the restriction on the number of swimmers from each nation. In the evening session, American Daniel Diehl won the B final in 53.67, a time that would have placed fourth in the A final.

== Records ==
Prior to this competition, the existing records were as follows:

Records before the 2026 Pan Pacific Swimming Championships
| Record | Time (s) | Athlete (nation) | Meet | Location | Date | Ref |
|---|---|---|---|---|---|---|
| World record | 51.60 | Thomas Ceccon (ITA) | 2022 World Championships | Budapest, Hungary | June 20, 2022 | |
| Championship record | 51.94 | Ryan Murphy (USA) | 2018 Pan Pacs | Tokyo, Japan | August 9, 2018 | |

== Schedule ==
The schedule was as follows:

All times are Pacific Daylight Time (UTC−7)

| Date | Time | Round |
|---|---|---|
| Wednesday, August 12, 2026 | 11:04 | Heats |
| Wednesday, August 12, 2026 | 20:08 | Finals |

== Results ==
=== Heats ===
The heats were held at 11:04 on August 12, 2026.

Heat results
| Rank | Heat | Lane | Swimmer | Nation | Time | Notes |
|---|---|---|---|---|---|---|
| 1 | 3 | 5 | Blake Tierney | Canada | 53.13 | QA |
| 2 | 3 | 4 | Will Modglin | United States | 53.17 | QA |
| 3 | 3 | 3 | Marcus Reyes-Gentry | Mexico | 53.69 | QA |
| 4 | 2 | 4 | Jack Aikins | United States | 53.90 | QA |
| 5 | 2 | 5 | Hidekazu Takehara | Japan | 54.10 | QA |
| 6 | 1 | 4 | Daniel Diehl | United States | 54.16 | QB |
| =7 | 1 | 5 | Raben Dommann | Canada | 54.36 | QA |
| =7 | 2 | 3 | Kodai Nishiono | Japan | 54.36 | QA |
| 9 | 2 | 6 | Jack Harvey | Bermuda | 54.51 | QA, NR |
| 10 | 1 | 2 | Zac Dell | New Zealand | 54.78 | QB |
| 11 | 1 | 6 | Stuart Swinburn | Australia | 54.81 | QB |
| 12 | 3 | 7 | Loic Courville-Fortin | Canada | 55.16 | QB |
| 13 | 2 | 2 | Anthony Rincon | Colombia | 55.26 | QB |
| 14 | 3 | 6 | Reo Miura | Japan | 55.33 | QB |
| 15 | 1 | 3 | Chuang Mu-Lun | Chinese Taipei | 55.51 | QB |
| 16 | 2 | 7 | Adrian van Wyk | South Africa | 56.63 | QB |
| 17 | 1 | 7 | Michael van Heerden | South Africa | 57.75 | R |
| 18 | 3 | 1 | Matthew Mann | South Africa | 58.29 | |
| | 3 | 2 | Ethan Ekk | Canada | DNS | |

=== B Final ===
The B final was held at 20:08 on August 12, 2026.

B Final results
| Rank | Lane | Swimmer | Nation | Time | Notes |
|---|---|---|---|---|---|
| 9 | 4 | Daniel Diehl | United States | 53.67 | |
| 10 | 3 | Stuart Swinburn | Australia | 55.05 | |
| 11 | 1 | Chuang Mu-Lun | Chinese Taipei | 55.44 | |
| 12 | 6 | Loic Courville-Fortin | Canada | 55.56 | |
| 13 | 7 | Reo Miura | Japan | 55.69 | |
| 14 | 2 | Anthony Rincon | Colombia | 55.81 | |
| 15 | 8 | Adrian van Wyk | South Africa | 56.58 | |
| 16 | 5 | Zac Dell | New Zealand | 56.65 | |

=== A Final ===
The A final was held after the B final on August 12, 2026.

A Final results
| Rank | Lane | Swimmer | Nation | Time | Notes |
|---|---|---|---|---|---|
| 1st place, gold medalist(s) | 4 | Blake Tierney | Canada | 53.18 | |
| 2nd place, silver medalist(s) | 5 | Will Modglin | United States | 53.37 | |
| 3rd place, bronze medalist(s) | 6 | Jack Aikins | United States | 53.46 | |
| 4 | 3 | Marcus Reyes-Gentry | Mexico | 54.04 | |
| 5 | 2 | Hidekazu Takehara | Japan | 54.33 | |
| 6 | 1 | Kodai Nishiono | Japan | 54.51 | |
| 7 | 7 | Raben Dommann | Canada | 55.01 | |
| 8 | 8 | Jack Harvey | Bermuda | 55.16 | |
