= 2026 USA Swimming Short Course World Championship trials =

- Host city: Westmont, Illinois, U.S.
- Date: October 28–31, 2026
- Events: 36 (men: 18; women: 18)

The 2026 USA Swimming Short Course World Championship trials were held from 28 to 31 October, 2026, at the FMC Natatorium in Westmont, Illinois. The meet served as the Short Course National Championships in swimming for the United States and the qualifier for 2026 World Aquatics Swimming Championships (25 m).

== Results ==
Key: Highlighted swimmers achieved the qualification conditions to be included in the Short Course World Championships team in that respective event.

=== Men's events ===
Event	Gold		Silver		Bronze	
50 m freestyle	Caeleb Dressel	20.57	Jack Alexy	20.59	Chris Guiliano	20.66
100 m freestyle	Jack Alexy	44.64 WR	Chris Guiliano	45.22	Caeleb Dressel	45.65
200 m freestyle	Luke Hobson	1:39.93 US	Chris Guiliano	1:40.26	Gabriel Jett	1:40.58
400 m freestyle	Luke Hobson	3:36.24	Kieran Smith	3:37.13	Ryan Erisman	3:38.43
800 m freestyle	Ryan Erisman	7:34.84	Leonardo Barbieri Alcantara	7:47.31	Jakub Poliacik	7:51.70
1500 m freestyle	Ryan Erisman	14:51.71	Luke Brennan	14:56.94	James Darcy	15:08.48
50 m backstroke	Adam Chaney	22.71	Johnny Crush	23.28	Nick Simons	23.36
100 m backstroke	Adam Chaney	49.50	Owen McDonald	49.96	Luca Urlando	50.04
200 m backstroke	Gabriel Jett	1:47.75	Destin Lasco	1:47.94	Owen McDonald	1:50.10
50 m breaststroke	Van Mathias	25.21 AR, US	Finn Brooks	25.52	Mitch Mason	26.09
100 m breaststroke	Van Mathias	55.14 WR	Brian Benzing	56.23	Josh Bey	57.23
200 m breaststroke	Josh Bey	2:02.23	Noah Cakir	2:02.24	AJ Pouch	2:03.91
50 m butterfly	Ilya Kharun	21.46 AR, US	Caeleb Dressel	21.62	Tyler Ray	21.95
100 m butterfly	Ilya Kharun	48.45 US	Tyler Ray	48.56	Luca Urlando Caeleb Dressel	48.57
200 m butterfly	Luca Urlando	1:47.65 AR, US	Ilya Kharun	1:48.12	Tyler Ray	1:48.24
100 m individual medley	Caeleb Dressel	50.34 US	Grant House	51.33	Maximus Williamson	51.39
200 m individual medley	Maximus Williamson	1:49.70	Destin Lasco	1:50.59	Grant House	1:53.58
400 m individual medley	Josh Bey	4:00.05	Ryan Erisman	4:02.28	Noah Cakir	4:03.62

=== Women's events ===
Event	Gold		Silver		Bronze	
50 m freestyle	Kate Douglass	22.75 =WR	Gretchen Walsh	22.99	Camille Spink	23.26
100 m freestyle	Kate Douglass	49.64 WR	Gretchen Walsh	50.61	Liberty Clark	50.94
200 m freestyle	Liberty Clark	1:51.31 AR	Rylee Erisman	1:51.96	Simone Manuel	1:52.05
400 m freestyle	Claire Weinstein	4:00.18	Rylee Erisman	4:00.25	Chloe Stepanek	4:08.52
800 m freestyle	Claire Weinstein	8:25.15	Katie McCarthy	8:30.55	Zoe Nordmann	8:31.09
1500 m freestyle	Katie McCarthy	16:10.50	Not awarded			
50 m backstroke	Katharine Berkoff	25.21 WR	Claire Curzan	25.26	Olivia Smoliga	25.70
100 m backstroke	Claire Curzan	53.92 WR	Katharine Berkoff	54.72	Regan Smith	54.82
200 m backstroke	Claire Curzan	1:57.65 AR, US	Regan Smith	1:58.49	Phoebe Bacon	2:01.18
50 m breaststroke	Skyler Smith	29.65	Piper Enge	29.74	Caroline Larsen	29.77
100 m breaststroke	Piper Enge	1:03.91	Alex Walsh	1:04.59	Maddy Huggins	1:04.90
200 m breaststroke	Kate Douglass	2:14.12	Alex Walsh	2:18.76	Lucy Bell	2:21.71
50 m butterfly	Gretchen Walsh	23.80	Claire Curzan	24.75	Alex Shackell	25.45
100 m butterfly	Gretchen Walsh	53.50	Alex Shackell	55.93	Lillie Nordmann	57.26
200 m butterfly	Regan Smith	2:00.87	Alex Shackell	2:02.76	Rachel Klinker	2:05.04
100 m individual medley	Gretchen Walsh	56.58	Torri Huske	58.24	Phoebe Bacon	58.34
200 m individual medley	Kate Douglass	2:01.66 US	Alex Walsh	2:04.54	Torri Huske	2:07.83
400 m individual medley	Alex Walsh	4:29.18	Isabelle Odgers	4:35.85	Adalyn Lee	4:45.87

=== Freestyle relay qualifiers ===
Key: Highlighted swimmers achieved the qualification conditions to be included in the Short Course World Championships team in that respective relay event based on their performance in the corresponding 100 meter or 200 meter freestyle individual event.

==== Men ====
Place →	1st	2nd	3rd	4th	5th	6th	7th	8th
4×100 m freestyle	Jack Alexy; 44.64	Chris Guiliano; 45.22	Caeleb Dressel; 45.65	Matt King; 46.03	Gabriel Jett; 46.18	Destin Lasco; 46.20	Grant House; 46.26	Patrick Sammon; 46.49
4×200 m freestyle	Luke Hobson; 1:39.93	Chris Guiliano; 1:40.26	Gabriel Jett; 1:40.58	Jack Alexy; 1:41.05	Brooks Curry; 1:41.72	Kieran Smith; 1:42.30	Mitchell Schott; 1:43.00	Jack Dahlgren; 1:43.76

==== Women ====
Place →	1st	2nd	3rd	4th	5th	6th	7th	8th
4×100 m freestyle	Kate Douglass; 49.64	Gretchen Walsh; 50.61	Liberty Clark; 50.94	Rylee Erisman; 51.22	Camille Spink; 51.66	Simone Manuel; 52.26	Cadence Vincent; 52.34	Chloe Stepanek; 53.23
4×200 m freestyle	Liberty Clark; 1:51.31	Rylee Erisman; 1:51.96	Simone Manuel; 1:52.05	Camille Spink; 1:54.14	Alex Shackell; 1:54.46	Claire Weinstein; 1:56.50	Chloe Stepanek; 1:56.59	—N/a

== U.S. Short Course World Championships Team ==
=== Men ===
Carson Foster*, Luke Barr*, Ryan Erisman, Ilya Kharun, Tyler Ray, Gabriel Jett, Destin Lasco, Van Mathias, Brian Benzing, Caeleb Dressel, Jack Alexy, Luke Hobson, Kieran Smith, Grant House, Josh Bey, Adam Chaney, Chris Guiliano, Luca Urlando, Finn Brooks, Noah Cakir, Maximus Williamson, Owen McDonald

=== Women ===
Anna Peplowski*, Katie McCarthy, Katharine Berkoff, Claire Curzan, Kate Douglass, Alex Walsh, Rylee Erisman, Gretchen Walsh, Regan Smith, Alex Shackell, Phoebe Bacon, Liberty Clark, Piper Enge, Simone Manuel, Camille Spink, Skyler Smith, Isabelle Odgers

(*) The wild card qualified from the 2026 World Aquatics Swimming World Cup.
