= 2025 USA Swimming Championships =

- Host city: Indianapolis, Indiana, U.S.
- Date: June 3 – 7, 2025
- Venue: Indiana University Natatorium
- Events: 34 (men: 17; women: 17)

The 2025 Toyota National Swimming Championships were held from June 3 to 7, 2025, at the Indiana University Natatorium in Indianapolis, Indiana.

== Results ==
Key: Highlighted swimmers achieved the qualification conditions to be included in the World Championships team in that respective event.

=== Men's events ===
Event	Gold		Silver		Bronze	
50 m freestyle	Jack Alexy	21.36	Santo Condorelli	21.68	Jonny Kulow	21.73
100 m freestyle	Jack Alexy	47.17	Patrick Sammon	47.47	Chris Guiliano	47.49
200 m freestyle	Luke Hobson	1:43.73 US, CR	Gabriel Jett	1:44.70	Rex Maurer	1:45.13
400 m freestyle	Rex Maurer	3:43.33 US, CR	Luka Mijatovic	3:45.71	Ryan Erisman	3:46.01
800 m freestyle	Bobby Finke	7:43.13	Rex Maurer	7:49.53	David Johnston	7:49.85
1500 m freestyle	Bobby Finke	14:48.65	David Johnston	14:57.83	Aiden Hammer	15:05.13
50 m backstroke	Quintin McCarty	24.34	Shaine Casas	24.44	Will Modglin	24.76
100 m backstroke	Tommy Janton	53.00	Jack Aikins	53.19	Daniel Diehl	53.35
200 m backstroke	Jack Aikins	1:54.25	Keaton Jones	1:54.85	Daniel Diehl	1:55.08
50 m breaststroke	Campbell McKean	26.90	Michael Andrew	26.92	Brian Benzing	27.40
100 m breaststroke	Campbell McKean	58.96	Josh Matheny	59.18	Nate Germonprez	59.89
200 m breaststroke	Josh Matheny	2:08.87	AJ Pouch	2:09.31	Gabe Nunziata	2:09.71
50 m butterfly	Dare Rose	23.06	Michael Andrew	23.21	Shaine Casas	23.32
100 m butterfly	Shaine Casas	50.51	Thomas Heilman	50.70	Dare Rose	51.06
200 m butterfly	Luca Urlando	1:53.42	Carson Foster	1:53.70	Thomas Heilman	1:54.03
200 m individual medley	Shaine Casas	1:55.73	Carson Foster	1:55.76	Trenton Julian	1:57.59
400 m individual medley	Bobby Finke (Note: Bobby Finke declining his spot in the 400 IM)	4:07.46	Carson Foster	4:07.92	Rex Maurer	4:09.65

=== Women's events ===
Event	Gold		Silver		Bronze	
50 m freestyle	Gretchen Walsh	23.91 =AR, US, CR	Torri Huske	23.98	Kate Douglass	24.04
100 m freestyle	Torri Huske	52.43 US, CR	Gretchen Walsh	52.78	Simone Manuel	52.83
200 m freestyle	Claire Weinstein	1:54.92	Katie Ledecky	1:55.26	Torri Huske	1:55.71
400 m freestyle	Katie Ledecky	3:58.56	Claire Weinstein	4:00.05	Bella Sims	4:07.11
800 m freestyle	Katie Ledecky	8:05.76 CR	Claire Weinstein	8:19.67	Jillian Cox	8:19.88
1500 m freestyle	Katie Ledecky	15:36.76	Claire Weinstein	16:01.96	Jillian Cox	16:05.88
50 m backstroke	Katharine Berkoff	26.97 AR, US, CR	Regan Smith	27.20	Claire Curzan	27.26
100 m backstroke	Regan Smith	57.69	Katharine Berkoff	58.13	Claire Curzan Leah Shackley	58.60
200 m backstroke	Claire Curzan	2:05.09	Regan Smith	2:05.84	Leah Shackley	2:06.66
50 m breaststroke	Lilly King	29.88	McKenzie Siroky	30.43	Not awarded	
50 m breaststroke	Lilly King	29.88	Emma Weber	30.43	Not awarded	
100 m breaststroke	Kate Douglass	1:05.79	Lilly King	1:06.02	Alex Walsh	1:06.50
200 m breaststroke	Kate Douglass	2:21.45	Alex Walsh	2:22.45	Katie Christopherson	2:26.65
50 m butterfly	Gretchen Walsh	24.66 AR, US, CR	Kate Douglass	25.39	Brady Kendall	26.02
100 m butterfly	Gretchen Walsh	54.76 CR	Torri Huske	56.61	Alex Shackell	57.71
200 m butterfly	Caroline Bricker	2:05.80	Regan Smith	2:05.85	Tess Howley	2:06.79
200 m individual medley	Alex Walsh	2:08.45	Phoebe Bacon	2:09.22	Caroline Bricker	2:10.12
400 m individual medley	Emma Weyant	4:34.81	Katie Grimes	4:37.22	Leah Hayes	4:38.46

=== Freestyle relay qualifiers ===
Key: Highlighted swimmers achieved the qualification conditions to be included in the World Championships team in that respective relay event based on their performance in the corresponding 100 meter or 200 meter freestyle individual event.

==== Men ====
Place →	1st	2nd	3rd	4th	5th	6th	7th	8th
4×100 m freestyle	Jack Alexy; 47.17	Patrick Sammon; 47.47	Chris Guiliano; 47.49	Destin Lasco; 47.58	Jonny Kulow; 47.82	Shaine Casas; 47.92	Henry McFadden; 47.97	Grant House; 48.02
4×200 m freestyle	Luke Hobson; 1:43.73	Gabriel Jett; 1:44.70	Rex Maurer; 1:45.13	Henry McFadden; 1:45.22	Carson Foster; 1:45.45	Kieran Smith; 1:45.72	Chris Guiliano; 1:45.73	Luke Mijatovic; 1:46.39

==== Women ====
Place →	1st	2nd	3rd	4th	5th	6th	7th	8th
4×100 m freestyle	Torri Huske; 52.43	Gretchen Walsh; 52.78	Simone Manuel; 52.83	Kate Douglass; 53.16	Erin Gemmel; 53.51	Anna Moesch; 53.54	Maxine Parker; 53.56	Claire Weinstein; 53.72
4×200 m freestyle	Claire Weinstein; 1:54.92	Katie Ledecky; 1:55.26	Torri Huske; 1:55.71	Erin Gemmell Anna Peplowski; 1:55.82	—N/a	Bella Sims; 1:57.18	Simone Manuel; 1:57.44	Isabel Ivey; 1:58.05

== U.S. World Championships Team ==
=== Men ===
Luca Urlando, Jack Alexy, Patrick Sammon, Chris Guiliano, Destin Lasco, Bobby Finke, Luke Hobson, Gabriel Jett, Rex Maurer, Henry McFadden, Josh Matheny, Jack Aikins, Dare Rose, Shaine Casas, Quintin McCarty, Campbell McKean, Tommy Janton, Carson Foster, Santo Condorelli, AJ Pouch, Luka Mijatovic, Thomas Heilman, David Johnston, Michael Andrew, Keaton Jones, Jonny Kulow, Charlie Clark*, Dylan Gravley*, Ivan Puskovitch*, Joey Tepper*

=== Women ===
Caroline Bricker, Katie Ledecky, Torri Huske, Gretchen Walsh, Simone Manuel, Kate Douglass, Claire Weinstein, Claire Curzan, Emma Weyant, Katharine Berkoff, Lilly King, Regan Smith, McKenzie Siroky, Phoebe Bacon, Katie Grimes, Bella Sims, Alex Walsh, Jillian Cox, Erin Gemmel, Anna Moesch, Anna Peplowski, Mariah Denigan*, Brinkleigh Hansen*, Brooke Travis*

(*) Not for pool events
