= Mare Nostrum (swimming) =

Swimming meet series

Mare Nostrum is a series of swimming meets with three meets around the Mediterranean in June annually. Until 2005 the Trofeo Settecolli of Rome (the world's oldest meet, since 1963) was also included in the series. Awards series are:

== Prize money ==
- Overall Series Winner (by FINA points) – 21,000 €
- I position (Men/Women) – 7000 €
- II position – €4000
- III position – €3000
- IV position – €2200
- V position – €1600
- VI position – €1400
- VII position – €1200
- VIII position – €800 .
- Mare Nostrum Record – €600
- Meet Record – €300
- Event Winner – €330
- Event Runner Up – €180
- Event 3rd Place – €90

== Meets ==
- Meeting Arena, Canet-en-Roussillon, France
- Gran Premi Internacional Ciutat de Barcelona, Barcelona, Spain
- International Swimming Meeting of Monte-Carlo, Monaco

== Mare Nostrum records ==
=== Men ===
Event	Time		Name	Nationality	Date	Meet	Location	Ref
50 m freestyle	21.31		Bruno Fratus	Brazil	9 June 2019	International Swimming Meeting of Monte-Carlo	Monte Carlo, Monaco	
100 m freestyle	47.88	h	Patrick Sammon	United States	31 May 2026	Gran Premi Internacional Ciutat de Barcelona	Barcelona, Spain	
200 m freestyle	1:44.74		David Popovici	Romania	29 May 2024	Gran Premi Internacional Ciutat de Barcelona	Barcelona, Spain	
400 m freestyle	3:41.71		Ian Thorpe	Australia	12 June 2001	International Swimming Meeting of Monte-Carlo	Monte Carlo, Monaco	
800 m freestyle	7:45.17		Daniel Wiffen	Ireland	21 May 2025	Gran Premi Internacional Ciutat de Barcelona	Barcelona, Spain	
1500 m freestyle	14:54.81		Daniel Wiffen	Ireland	25 May 2025	Meeting Arena	Canet-en-Roussillon, France	
50 m backstroke	24.23	sf	Pavel Samusenko	Russia	24 May 2026	International Swimming Meeting of Monte-Carlo	Monte Carlo, Monaco	
100 m backstroke	53.00		Ryosuke Irie	Japan	29 May 2022	Meeting Arena	Canet-en-Roussillon, France	
200 m backstroke	1:54.34		Ryosuke Irie	Japan	12 June 2011	International Swimming Meeting of Monte-Carlo	Monte Carlo, Monaco	
50m breaststroke	26.33		Felipe Lima	Brazil	9 June 2019	International Swimming Meeting of Monte-Carlo	Monte Carlo, Monaco	
100m breaststroke	58.15		Adam Peaty	Great Britain	15 June 2019	Gran Premi Internacional Ciutat de Barcelona	Barcelona, Spain	
200m breaststroke	2:07.23		Arno Kamminga	Netherlands	5 June 2021	Gran Premi Internacional Ciutat de Barcelona	Barcelona, Spain	
50m butterfly	22.53		Andriy Govorov	Ukraine	17 June 2018	International Swimming Meeting of Monte-Carlo	Monte Carlo, Monaco	
100m butterfly	50.66		Kristóf Milák	Hungary	24 May 2026	International Swimming Meeting of Monte-Carlo	Monte Carlo, Monaco	
200m butterfly	1:53.89		Kristof Milak	Hungary	26 May 2022	Gran Premi Internacional Ciutat de Barcelona	Barcelona, Spain	
200m individual medley	1:56.31		Hugo González	Spain	6 June 2021	Gran Premi Internacional Ciutat de Barcelona	Barcelona, Spain	
400m individual medley	4:07.96		László Cseh	Hungary	14 June 2008	Meeting Arena	Canet-en-Roussillon, France	

Legend: WR – World record; ER – European record;
Records not set in finals: h – heat; sf – semifinal; r – relay 1st leg; rh – relay heat 1st leg; b – B final; † – en route to final mark; so – swim-off; tt – time trial

=== Women ===
Event	Time		Name	Nationality	Date	Meet	Location	Ref
50m freestyle	23.82	sf	Sarah Sjöström	Sweden	21 May 2023	International Swimming Meeting of Monte-Carlo	Monte Carlo, Monaco	
100m freestyle	51.86		Marrit Steenbergen	Netherlands	27 May 2026	Meeting Arena	Canet-en-Roussillon, France	
200m freestyle	1:54.13		Siobhan Haughey	Hong Kong	28 May 2026	Meeting Arena	Canet-en-Roussillon, France	
400m freestyle	4:01.75		Erika Fairweather	New Zealand	30 May 2026	Gran Premi Internacional Ciutat de Barcelona	Barcelona, Spain	
800m freestyle	8:19.86		Rebecca Adlington	Great Britain	2 June 2012	Gran Premi Internacional Ciutat de Barcelona	Barcelona, Spain	
1500m freestyle	15:51.68		Delfina Pignatiello	Argentina	15 June 2019	Gran Premi Internacional Ciutat de Barcelona	Barcelona, Spain	
50m backstroke	27.24		Kylie Masse	Canada	29 May 2024	Gran Premi Internacional Ciutat de Barcelona	Barcelona, Spain	
100m backstroke	58.57		Kylie Masse	Canada	29 May 2022	Meeting Arena	Canet-en-Roussillon, France	
200m backstroke	2:06.66		Emily Seebohm	Australia	17 June 2017	Meeting Arena	Canet-en-Roussillon, France	
50m breaststroke	29.64		McKenzie Siroky	United States	23 May 2026	International Swimming Meeting of Monte-Carlo	Monte Carlo, Monaco	
100m breaststroke	1:04.82		Yulia Yefimova	Russia	17 June 2017	Meeting Arena	Canet-en-Roussillon, France	
200m breaststroke	2:19.67		Rikke Møller-Pedersen	Denmark	12 June 2014	Meeting Arena	Canet-en-Roussillon, France	
50m butterfly	24.76		Sarah Sjöström	Sweden	14 June 2017	Gran Premi Internacional Ciutat de Barcelona	Barcelona, Spain	
100m butterfly	55.76		Sarah Sjöström	Sweden	17 June 2017	Meeting Arena	Canet-en-Roussillon, France	
200m butterfly	2:06.70		Suzuka Hasegawa	Japan	11 June 2017	International Swimming Meeting of Monte-Carlo	Monte Carlo, Monaco	
200m individual medley	2:08.49		Katinka Hosszú	Hungary	11 June 2017	International Swimming Meeting of Monte-Carlo	Monte Carlo, Monaco	
400m individual medley	4:30.75		Katinka Hosszú	Hungary	11 June 2016	Gran Premi Internacional Ciutat de Barcelona	Barcelona, Spain	

Legend: WR – World record; ER – European record;
Records not set in finals: h – heat; sf – semifinal; r – relay 1st leg; rh – relay heat 1st leg; b – B final; † – en route to final mark; so – swim-off; tt – time trial

== Winners ==
Year	Gold	Silver	Bronze
2000	Denys Sylantyev (UKR)	Camelia Potec (ROM)	Sarah Poewe (RSA)
2001	Denys Sylantyev (UKR)	Claudia Poll (CRC)	Alexander Popov (RUS)
2002	Denys Sylantyev (UKR)	Oleg Lisogor (UKR)	Igor Martchenko (RUS)
2003	Martina Moravcová (SVK)	Mirna Jukić (AUT)	Andriy Serdinov (UKR)
2004	Camelia Potec (ROM)	Răzvan Florea (ROM)	Andriy Serdinov (UKR)
2005	László Cseh (HUN)	Nikolay Skvortsov (RUS)	Andriy Serdinov (UKR)
2006	Leisel Jones (AUS)	Libby Lenton (AUS)	Tayliah Zimmer (AUS)
2007	Tara Kirk (USA)	Sophie Edington (AUS)	Stefan Nystrand (SWE)
2008	Sophie Edington (AUS)	Mirna Jukić (AUT)	Nina Zhivanevskaya (ESP)
2009	Anastasia Zuyeva (RUS)	Therese Alshammar (SWE)	Valentina Artemyeva (RUS)
2010	Rebecca Soni (USA)	Therese Alshammar (SWE)	Yuliya Yefimova (RUS)
2011	Ryosuke Irie (JPN)	Shiho Sakai (JPN)	Anastasia Zuyeva (RUS)
2012			
