= 2026 Pan Pacific Swimming Championships – Mixed 4 × 100 metre medley relay =

Mixed 4 × 100 metre medley relay at the 2026 Pan Pacific Swimming Championships
- Venue: William Woollett Jr. Aquatics Center
- Dates: August 12
- Nations: 5
- Teams: 7
- Winning time: 3:36.70 WR

Medalists
gold medal	Will Modglin; Van Mathias; Gretchen Walsh; Kate Douglass	United States
silver medal	Iona Anderson; Sam Williamson; Matthew Temple; Meg Harris	Australia
bronze medal	Ingrid Wilm; Oliver Dawson; Finlay Knox; Taylor Ruck	Canada

Official Video

The mixed 4 × 100 metre medley relay event at the 2026 Pan Pacific Swimming Championships was held on August 12 at the William Woollett Jr. Aquatics Center in Irvine, California. The event was won by the United States team of Will Modglin, Van Mathias, Gretchen Walsh and Kate Douglass in a world record time of 3:36.70, breaking the previous record of 3:37.43 set by the United States at the 2024 Summer Olympics in Paris. The performance also broke the championship record of 3:38.91, established by Australia at the 2018 championships, when the event was contested for the first time. Australia, represented by Iona Anderson, Sam Williamson, Matthew Temple and Meg Harris, claimed the silver medal in 3:39.30, while Canada's Ingrid Wilm, Oliver Dawson, Finlay Knox and Taylor Ruck won the bronze medal in 3:43.22.

The event was contested as a single race, with seven teams representing five nations. Under the competition regulations, each nation was permitted to enter one A relay eligible for medals and team points, as well as a B relay that was ineligible for either. Although the regulations stipulated that B relays would compete in a separate heat preceding the A final, all seven teams competed together in a single heat for this event. Canada and South Africa each entered two teams, while the United States, Australia and Japan entered one team each. Australia entered as the top-seeded and defending champion, selecting a female–male–male–female lineup, while the United States adopted a male–male–female–female combination. The American team included Mathias, the national record holder in the men's 100 metre breaststroke, and Walsh, the world record holder in the women's 100 metre butterfly. Australia selected Temple, the national record holder in the men's 100 metre butterfly, but was without Kaylee McKeown and Mollie O'Callaghan, who had withdrawn from the championships due to illness and injury, respectively. Like the United States, Japan selected male swimmers for the opening backstroke and breaststroke legs, while one of South Africa's teams selected female swimmers for both opening legs. Canada's second team of Blake Tierney, Alexanne Lepage, Mary-Sophie Harvey and Ruslan Gaziev finished fourth overall in 3:45.62, followed by Japan's Hidekazu Takehara, Shin Ohashi, Rikako Ikee and Nagisa Ikemoto in fifth place with 3:46.10. South Africa's two teams finished sixth and seventh in 3:53.14 and 3:58.57, respectively.

Modglin completed the opening backstroke leg in 53.40 seconds to give the United States an early lead, although the team remained more than a second behind the existing world-record pace. Mathias subsequently recorded a breaststroke split of 57.30 seconds, bringing the Americans to the halfway mark in 1:50.70 and significantly reducing the deficit to world-record pace. Competing at his first senior international championships, Mathias recorded the 11th-fastest relay breaststroke split in history and became the third-fastest performer in the discipline, behind Adam Ramsay-Peaty and Qin Haiyang. Walsh extended the American lead with a butterfly split of 54.99 seconds, the second-fastest women's 100 metre butterfly relay split in history, surpassed only by her own 54.98 in the women's 4 × 100 metre medley relay at the 2025 World Aquatics Championships. Walsh had also been a member of the United States team that established the previous mixed medley relay world record, contributing a butterfly split of 55.18 seconds. Douglass completed the freestyle leg in 51.01 seconds, the fourth-fastest women's 100 metre freestyle relay split in history, to secure the gold medal and establish the new world record.

Compared with the previous world-record performance at the 2024 Olympics, the American team was 1.32 seconds slower on the opening backstroke leg but gained 0.99 seconds on breaststroke, 0.19 seconds on butterfly and 0.87 seconds on freestyle, improving the overall record by 0.73 seconds. The United States finished 2.60 seconds ahead of Australia and 6.52 seconds ahead of Canada, recording the first world record of the 2026 championships. Following the race, Douglass said that the team had discussed the possibility of breaking the world record before the event and that she had been confident in her ability to produce a fast freestyle split. Mathias and Modglin both expressed surprise at the result, with Modglin describing the opportunity to set a world record alongside Walsh and Douglass as an honor. The victory represented a reversal of the team's performance at the 2025 World Championships, where the United States had failed to qualify for the final after placing tenth in the preliminary heats with a time of 3:44.50. The world-record performance was subsequently named Relay of the Year at the 2026 Golden Goggle Awards, held on September 26, with Modglin, Mathias, Walsh and Douglass receiving the recognition.

== Records ==
Prior to this competition, the existing records were as follows:

Records before the 2026 Pan Pacific Swimming Championships
Record	Time	Nation	Meet	Location	Date	Ref
World record	3:37.43	United States (USA)	2024 Olympics	Paris, France	August 3, 2024	
Championship record	3:38.91	Australia (AUS)	2018 Pan Pacs	Tokyo, Japan	August 9, 2018	

== Schedule ==
The schedule was as follows:

All times are Pacific Daylight Time (UTC-7)

Date	Time	Round
Wednesday, August 12, 2026	21:37	Final

== Results ==
The event was held at 21:37 on August 12, 2026.

Results
Rank	Lane	Nation	Swimmers	Time	Points (Note: A team trophy was awarded to the nation scoring the most points. In individual events, points were awarded on a 9–7–6–5–4–3–2–1 basis for first through eighth place in the A final. In relay events, points were awarded on an 18–14–12–10–8–6–4–2 basis. B relay teams were ineligible to score points.)	Notes
1st place, gold medalist(s)	5	United States	Will Modglin (53.40); Van Mathias (57.30); Gretchen Walsh (54.99); Kate Douglass (51.01)	3:36.70	18	WR
2nd place, silver medalist(s)	4	Australia	Iona Anderson (59.14); Sam Williamson (58.50); Matthew Temple (49.60); Meg Harris (52.06)	3:39.30	14	
3rd place, bronze medalist(s)	3	Canada	Ingrid Wilm (59.73); Oliver Dawson (59.36); Finlay Knox (51.60); Taylor Ruck (52.53)	3:43.22	12	
4	1	Canada 2	Blake Tierney (53.44); Alexanne Lepage (1:05.21); Mary-Sophie Harvey (58.04); Ruslan Gaziev (48.93)	3:45.62		
5	6	Japan	Hidekazu Takehara (54.87); Shin Ohashi (58.24); Rikako Ikee (58.06); Nagisa Ikemoto (54.93)	3:46.10	10	
6	2	South Africa	Adrian van Wyk (56.79); Kaylene Corbett (1:09.39); Erin Gallagher (57.09); Kris Mihaylov (49.87)	3:53.14	8	
7	7	South Africa 2	Tayla Jonker (1:03.50); Simone Moll (1:09.39); Jarden Eaton (54.20); Arno Kruger (51.48)	3:58.57		
