= List of Americas records in swimming =

Americas

The Americas records in swimming are the fastest times ever by a swimmer representing a member country from PanAm Aquatics (PAQ), the swimming continental association for the Americas. PAQ doesn't maintain an official list for such performances. All bests shown on this list are tracked by statisticians not officially sanctioned by the governing body. These records should not be confused with the USA national records, typically referred to as the "American records", despite their similarities.

All records were set in finals unless noted otherwise.

== Long course (50 m) ==
=== Men ===
Event	Time		Name	Nationality	Date	Meet	Location	Ref
50 m freestyle	20.91		César Cielo	Brazil	18 December 2009	Brazilian Championships	São Paulo, Brazil	
100 m freestyle	46.81	sf	Jack Alexy	United States	30 July 2025	World Championships	Singapore, Singapore	
200 m freestyle	1:42.96		Michael Phelps	United States	12 August 2008	Olympic Games	Beijing, China	
400 m freestyle	3:42.76		Guilherme Costa	Brazil	27 July 2024	Olympic Games	Paris, France	
800 m freestyle	7:38.67		Bobby Finke	United States	26 July 2023	World Championships	Fukuoka, Japan	
1500 m freestyle	14:30.67	WR	Bobby Finke	United States	4 August 2024	Olympic Games	Paris, France	
50 m backstroke	23.71		Hunter Armstrong	United States	28 April 2022	U.S. International Team Trials	Greensboro, United States	
100 m backstroke	51.85	r	Ryan Murphy	United States	13 August 2016	Olympic Games	Rio de Janeiro, Brazil	
200 m backstroke	1:51.92	WR	Aaron Peirsol	United States	31 July 2009	World Championships	Rome, Italy	
50 m breaststroke	26.30		Van Mathias	United States	17 June 2026	TYR Pro Swim Series	Indianapolis, United States	
100 m breaststroke	58.01		Van Mathias	United States	20 June 2026	TYR Pro Swim Series	Indianapolis, United States	
200 m breaststroke	2:06.54		Matthew Fallon	United States	19 June 2024	U.S. Olympic Trials	Indianapolis, United States	
50 m butterfly	22.35		Caeleb Dressel	United States	22 July 2019	World Championships	Gwangju, South Korea	
100 m butterfly	49.45	WR	Caeleb Dressel	United States	31 July 2021	Olympic Games	Tokyo, Japan	
200 m butterfly	1:51.51		Michael Phelps	United States	29 July 2009	World Championships	Rome, Italy	
200 m individual medley	1:54.00		Ryan Lochte	United States	28 July 2011	World Championships	Shanghai, China	
400 m individual medley	4:03.84		Michael Phelps	United States	10 August 2008	Olympic Games	Beijing, China	
4×100 m freestyle relay	3:08.24	WR	Michael Phelps (47.51); Garrett Weber-Gale (47.02); Cullen Jones (47.65); Jason Lezak (46.06)	United States	11 August 2008	Olympic Games	Beijing, China	
4×200 m freestyle relay	6:58.55	WR	Michael Phelps (1:44.49); Ricky Berens (1:44.13); David Walters (1:45.47); Ryan Lochte (1:44.46)	United States	31 July 2009	World Championships	Rome, Italy	
4×100 m medley relay	3:26.78	WR	Ryan Murphy (52.31); Michael Andrew (58.49); Caeleb Dressel (49.03); Zach Apple (46.95)	United States	1 August 2021	Olympic Games	Tokyo, Japan	

Legend: # – Record awaiting ratification by UANA; WR – World record; e – equalled existing record;
Records not set in finals: h – heat; sf – semifinal; r – relay 1st leg; rh – relay heat 1st leg; b – B final; † – en route to final mark; so – swim-off; tt – time trial

=== Women ===
Event	Time		Name	Nationality	Date	Meet	Location	Ref
50 m freestyle	23.19	WR	Kate Douglass	United States	15 August 2026	Pan Pacific Championships	Irvine, United States	
100 m freestyle	51.69	r	Kate Douglass	United States	14 August 2026	Pan Pacific Championships	Irvine, United States	
200 m freestyle	1:53.61		Allison Schmitt	United States	31 July 2012	Olympic Games	London, United Kingdom	
400 m freestyle	3:54.18	WR	Summer McIntosh	Canada	7 June 2025	Canadian Trials	Victoria, Canada	
800 m freestyle	8:04.12	WR	Katie Ledecky	United States	3 May 2025	TYR Pro Swim Series	Fort Lauderdale, United States	
1500 m freestyle	15:20.48	WR	Katie Ledecky	United States	16 May 2018	Pro Swim Series	Indianapolis, United States	
50 m backstroke	26.90		Katharine Berkoff	United States	13 August 2026	Pan Pacific Championships	Irvine, United States	
100 m backstroke	57.13	WR	Regan Smith	United States	18 June 2024	U.S. Olympic Trials	Indianapolis, United States	
200 m backstroke	2:03.35	sf	Regan Smith	United States	26 July 2019	World Championships	Gwangju, South Korea	
50 m breaststroke	29.40		Lilly King	United States	30 July 2017	World Championships	Budapest, Hungary	
100 m breaststroke	1:04.13	WR	Lilly King	United States	25 July 2017	World Championships	Budapest, Hungary	
200 m breaststroke	2:18.50		Kate Douglass	United States	1 August 2025	World Championships	Singapore, Singapore	
50 m butterfly	24.51		Gretchen Walsh	United States	26 June 2026	Sette Colli Trophy	Rome, Italy	
100 m butterfly	54.33	WR	Gretchen Walsh	United States	2 May 2026	Fort Lauderdale Open	Fort Lauderdale, United States	
200 m butterfly	2:01.65	WR	Summer McIntosh	Canada	5 July 2026	Canadian Trials	Montreal, Canada	
200 m individual medley	2:05.70	WR	Summer McIntosh	Canada	9 June 2025	Canadian Trials	Victoria, Canada	
400 m individual medley	4:23.65	WR	Summer McIntosh	Canada	11 June 2025	Canadian Trials	Victoria, Canada	
4×100m freestyle relay	3:29.32		Kate Douglass (51.69); Gretchen Walsh (52.23); Torri Huske (52.79); Simone Manuel (52.61)	United States	14 August 2026	Pan Pacific Championships	Irvine, United States	
4×200m freestyle relay	7:40.01		Claire Weinstein (1:54.83); Anna Peplowski (1:54.75); Erin Gemmell (1:56.72); Katie Ledecky (1:53.71)	United States	31 July 2025	World Championships	Singapore, Singapore	
4×100m medley relay	3:49.34	WR	Regan Smith (57.57); Kate Douglass (1:04.27); Gretchen Walsh (54.98); Torri Huske (52.52)	United States	3 August 2025	World Championships	Singapore, Singapore	

Legend: # – Record awaiting ratification by UANA; WR – World record; CR – Commonwealth record; e – equalled existing record;
Records not set in finals: h – heat; sf – semifinal; r – relay 1st leg; rh – relay heat 1st leg; b – B final; † – en route to final mark; so – swim-off; tt – time trial

=== Mixed relay ===
Event	Time		Name	Club	Date	Meet	Location	Ref
4×100 m freestyle relay	3:18.48	WR	Jack Alexy (46.91); Patrick Sammon (46.70); Kate Douglass (52.43); Torri Huske (52.44)	United States	2 August 2025	World Championships	Singapore, Singapore	
4×100 m medley relay	3:36.70	WR	Will Modglin (53.40); Van Mathias (57.30); Gretchen Walsh (54.99); Kate Douglass (51.01)	United States	12 August 2026	Pan Pacific Championships	Irvine, United States	

Legend: # – Record awaiting ratification by UANA; WR – World record; e – equalled existing record;
Records not set in finals: h – heat; so – swim-off

== Short course (25 m) ==
=== Men ===
Event	Time		Name	Nationality	Date	Meet	Location	Ref
50 m freestyle	19.90	sf, WR	Jordan Crooks	Cayman Islands	14 December 2024	World Championships	Budapest, Hungary	
100 m freestyle	44.64	WR	Jack Alexy	United States	30 October 2026	World Championship Trials	Westmont, United States	
200 m freestyle	1:38.61	WR	Luke Hobson	United States	15 December 2024	World Championships	Budapest, Hungary	
400 m freestyle	3:34.38		Kieran Smith	United States	15 December 2022	World Championships	Melbourne, Australia	
800 m freestyle	7:30.41		David Johnston	United States	24 August 2022	Australian Championships	Sydney, Australia	
1500 m freestyle	14:19.29		Connor Jaeger	United States	12 December 2015	Duel in the Pool	Indianapolis, United States	
50 m backstroke	22.53		Ryan Murphy	United States	25 November 2021	International Swimming League	Eindhoven, Netherlands	
100 m backstroke	48.33		Coleman Stewart	United States	29 August 2021	International Swimming League	Naples, Italy	
200 m backstroke	1:46.68		Ryan Lochte	United States	19 December 2010	World Championships	Dubai, United Arab Emirates	
50m breaststroke	25.21		Van Mathias	United States	30 October 2026	World Championship Trials	Westmont, United States	
100m breaststroke	55.14	WR	Van Mathias	United States	29 October 2026	World Championship Trials	Westmont, United States	
200m breaststroke	2:01.60		Nic Fink	United States	16 December 2022	World Championships	Melbourne, Australia	
50m butterfly	21.46		Ilya Kharun	United States	31 October 2026	World Championship Trials	Westmont, United States	
100m butterfly	47.68	WR	Joshua Liendo	Canada	23 October 2025	World Cup	Toronto, Canada	
200m butterfly	1:47.65		Luca Urlando	United States	30 October 2026	World Championship Trials	Westmont, United States	
100m individual medley	49.28	WR	Caeleb Dressel	United States	22 November 2020	International Swimming League	Budapest, Hungary	
200m individual medley	1:49.43		Shaine Casas	United States	11 October 2025	World Cup	Carmel, United States	
400m individual medley	3:55.50		Ryan Lochte	United States	16 December 2010	World Championships	Dubai, United Arab Emirates	
4×50m freestyle relay	1:21.80	WR	Caeleb Dressel (20.43); Ryan Held (20.25); Jack Conger (20.59); Michael Chadwick (20.53)	United States	14 December 2018	World Championships	Hangzhou, China	
4×100m freestyle relay	3:01.66	WR	Jack Alexy (45.05); Luke Hobson (45.18); Kieran Smith (46.01); Chris Guiliano (45.42)	United States	10 December 2024	World Championships	Budapest, Hungary	
4×200m freestyle relay	6:40.51	WR	Luke Hobson (1:38.91); Carson Foster (1:40.77); Shaine Casas (1:40.34); Kieran Smith (1:40.49)	United States	13 December 2024	World Championships	Budapest, Hungary	
4×50m medley relay	1:30.37		Ryan Murphy (22.61); Nic Fink (25.24); Shaine Casas (22.13); Michael Andrew (20.39)	United States	17 December 2022	World Championships	Melbourne, Australia	
4×100m medley relay	3:18.98		Ryan Murphy (48.96); Nic Fink (54.88); Trenton Julian (49.19); Kieran Smith (45.95)	United States	18 December 2022	World Championships	Melbourne, Australia	

Legend: # – Record awaiting ratification by UANA; WR – World record; CR – Commonwealth record; e – equalled existing record;
Records not set in finals: h – heat; sf – semifinal; r – relay 1st leg; rh – relay heat 1st leg; b – B final; † – en route to final mark; so – swim-off; tt – time trial

=== Women ===
Event	Time		Name	Nationality	Date	Meet	Location	Ref
50m freestyle	22.75	=WR	Gretchen Walsh	United States	16 October 2026	UVA Pro Elite SCM Worlds Prep Meet	Charlottesville, United States	
50m freestyle	22.75	=WR	Kate Douglass	United States	29 October 2026	World Championship Trials	Westmont, United States	
100m freestyle	49.64	WR	Kate Douglass	United States	31 October 2026	World Championship Trials	Westmont, United States	
200m freestyle	1:51.31		Liberty Clark	United States	30 October 2026	World Championship Trials	Westmont, United States	
400m freestyle	3:50.25	WR	Summer McIntosh	Canada	10 December 2024	World Championships	Budapest, Hungary	
800m freestyle	7:57.42		Katie Ledecky	United States	5 November 2022	World Cup	Indianapolis, United States	
1500m freestyle	15:08.24	WR	Katie Ledecky	United States	29 October 2022	World Cup	Toronto, Canada	
50m backstroke	25.21	WR	Katharine Berkoff	United States	29 October 2026	World Championship Trials	Westmont, United States	
100m backstroke	53.92	WR	Claire Curzan	United States	30 October 2026	World Championship Trials	Westmont, United States	
200m backstroke	1:57.65		Claire Curzan	United States	31 October 2026	World Championship Trials	Westmont, United States	
50m breaststroke	28.56	CR	Alia Atkinson	Jamaica	6 October 2018	World Cup	Budapest, Hungary	
100m breaststroke	1:02.36	=WR	Alia Atkinson	Jamaica	6 December 2014	World Championships	Doha, Qatar	
100m breaststroke	1:02.36	=WR	Alia Atkinson	Jamaica	26 August 2016	World Cup	Chartres, France	
200m breaststroke	2:12.50	WR	Kate Douglass	United States	13 December 2024	World Championships	Budapest, Hungary	
50m butterfly	23.72	WR	Gretchen Walsh	United States	11 October 2025	World Cup	Carmel, United States	
100m butterfly	52.71	WR	Gretchen Walsh	United States	14 December 2024	World Championships	Budapest, Hungary	
200m butterfly	1:59.32	WR	Summer McIntosh	Canada	12 December 2024	World Championships	Budapest, Hungary	
100m individual medley	55.11	WR	Gretchen Walsh	United States	13 December 2024	World Championships	Budapest, Hungary	
200m individual medley	2:01.63	WR	Kate Douglass	United States	10 December 2024	World Championships	Budapest, Hungary	
400m individual medley	4:15.48	WR	Summer McIntosh	Canada	14 December 2024	World Championships	Budapest, Hungary	
4×50m freestyle relay	1:33.89		Torri Huske (24.08); Claire Curzan (23.30); Erika Brown (23.74); Kate Douglass (22.77)	United States	15 December 2022	World Championships	Melbourne, Australia	
4×100m freestyle relay	3:25.01	WR	Kate Douglass (50.95); Katharine Berkoff (51.38); Alex Shackell (52.01); Gretchen Walsh (50.67)	United States	10 December 2024	World Championships	Budapest, Hungary	
4×200m freestyle relay	7:30.13	WR	Alex Walsh (1:53.25); Paige Madden (1:53.18); Katie Grimes (1:53.39); Claire Weinstein (1:50.31)	United States	12 December 2024	World Championships	Budapest, Hungary	
4×50m medley relay	1:42.38		Olivia Smoliga (25.97); Katie Meili (29.29); Kelsi Dahlia (24.02); Mallory Comerford (23.10)	United States	12 December 2018	World Championships	Hangzhou, China	
4×100m medley relay	3:40.41	WR	Regan Smith (54.02); Lilly King (1:03.02); Gretchen Walsh (52.84); Kate Douglass (50.53)	United States	15 December 2024	World Championships	Budapest, Hungary	

Legend: # – Record awaiting ratification by UANA; WR – World record; CR – Commonwealth record; e – equalled existing record;
Records not set in finals: h – heat; sf – semifinal; r – relay 1st leg; rh – relay heat 1st leg; b – B final; † – en route to final mark; so – swim-off; tt – time trial

=== Mixed relay ===
Event	Time		Name	Nationality	Date	Meet	Location	Ref
4×50 m freestyle relay	1:27.89		Caeleb Dressel (20.43); Ryan Held (20.60); Mallory Comerford (23.44); Kelsi Dahlia (23.42)	United States	12 December 2018	World Championships	Hangzhou, China	
4×50 m medley relay	1:35.15	WR	Ryan Murphy (22.37); Nic Fink (24.96); Kate Douglass (24.09); Torri Huske (23.73)	United States	14 December 2022	World Championships	Melbourne, Australia	
4×100 m medley relay	3:30.55		Regan Smith (54.19); Lilly King (1:03.05); Dare Rose (48.68); Jack Alexy (44.63)	United States	14 December 2024	World Championships	Budapest, Hungary	

Legend: # – Record awaiting ratification by UANA; WR – World record; e – equalled existing record;
Records not set in finals: h – heat; † – en route to final mark; so – swim-off
