= Swimming at the 2023 Pan American Games – Men's 100 metre backstroke =

Men's 100 metre backstroke at the 2023 Pan American Games
- Venue: Aquatic Center
- Date: October 23, 2023
- Competitors: 26 from 19 nations
- Winning time: 54.20

Medalists
Gold medal	Adam Chaney	United States
Silver medal	Ulises Saravia	Argentina
Bronze medal	Blake Tierney	Canada

The men's 100 metre backstroke competition of the swimming events at the 2023 Pan American Games were held on October 23, 2023, at the Aquatic Center in Santiago, Chile.

== Records ==
World record	Thomas Ceccon (ITA)	51.60	Budapest, Hungary	June 20, 2022
Pan American Games record	Guilherme Guido (BRA)	53.12	Toronto, Canada	July 18, 2015

== Results ==
KEY:	QA	Qualified for A final	QB	Qualified for B final	GR	Games record	NR	National record	PB	Personal best	SB	Seasonal best

=== Heats ===
The first round was held on October 23.

Rank	Heat	Lane	Name	Nationality	Time	Notes
1	3	5	Blake Tierney	Canada	54.68	QA
2	4	4	Adam Chaney	United States	54.71	QA
3	2	5	Guilherme Basseto	Brazil	54.75	QA
4	3	4	Christopher O'Connor	United States	54.96	QA
5	4	5	Ulises Saravia	Argentina	55.07	QA
6	4	3	Gabriel Fantoni	Brazil	55.21	QA
7	4	6	Omar Pinzón	Colombia	55.29	QA
8	3	3	Yeziel Morales	Puerto Rico	55.90	QA
9	2	6	Jack Kirby	Barbados	56.11	QB
10	4	2	Anthony Rincón	Colombia	56.22	QB
11	3	7	Andy Xianyang	Mexico	56.31	QB
12	2	1	Patrick Groters	Aruba	56.36	QB
13	3	6	Diego Camacho	Mexico	56.39	QB
13	2	3	Lamar Taylor	Bahamas	56.39	QB
15	3	2	Charles Hockin	Paraguay	56.71	QB
16	2	2	Maximillian Wilson	Virgin Islands	56.74	QB
17	4	7	Agustín Hernandez	Argentina	56.78	
18	2	7	Jack Harvey	Bermuda	57.04	
19	4	1	Guido Montero	Costa Rica	58.22	
20	3	8	Edhy Vargas	Chile	58.30	
21	4	8	Zarek Wilson	Trinidad and Tobago	58.37	
22	3	1	Max Ahumada	Chile	58.86	
23	1	5	Miguel Turcios	Independent Athletes Team	1:00.03	
24	1	4	Zackary Gresham	Grenada	1:00.42	
	2	4	Javier Acevedo	Canada	DNS	
	1	3	Noah Mascoll-Gomes	Antigua and Barbuda	DNS	

=== Final B ===
The B final was also held on October 23.

Rank	Lane	Name	Nationality	Time	Notes
9	6	Patrick Groters	Aruba	55.96	
10	4	Jack Kirby	Barbados	56.12	
11	2	Diego Camacho	Mexico	56.30	
12	3	Andy Xianyang	Mexico	56.50	
13	8	Agustín Hernandez	Argentina	56.53	
14	5	Anthony Rincón	Colombia	56.70	
15	1	Maximillian Wilson	Virgin Islands	57.14	
16	7	Charles Hockin	Paraguay	57.55	
		Lamar Talor	Bahamas	DNS	

=== Final A ===
The A final was also held on October 23.

Rank	Lane	Name	Nationality	Time	Notes
1st place, gold medalist(s)	5	Adam Chaney	United States	54.20	
2nd place, silver medalist(s)	2	Ulises Saravia	Argentina	54.23	
3rd place, bronze medalist(s)	4	Blake Tierney	Canada	54.25	
4	3	Guilherme Basseto	Brazil	54.40	
5	6	Christopher O'Connor	United States	54.61	
6	7	Gabriel Fantoni	Brazil	54.82	
7	1	Omar Pinzón	Colombia	55.16	
8	8	Yeziel Morales	Puerto Rico	56.38	
