= 2026 Pan Pacific Swimming Championships =

International swimming competition

- Host city: Irvine, California
- Date: 12–15 August
- Venue(s): William Woollett Jr. Aquatics Center and Long Beach
- Events: 43

The 2026 Pan Pacific Swimming Championships, a long course (50 m) event, were held at the William Woollett Jr. Aquatics Center in Irvine, California, from August 12 to 15, 2026. The 2022 edition, set to be held in Canada, was skipped due to the COVID-19 pandemic.

The roster for the United States was set in September 2025.

== Schedule ==
H	Heats	F	Final	TF	Timed final

M = Morning session (starting at 10:00), E = Evening session (starting at 18:00)

Men
Date →	10 August		11 August		12 August		13 August		14 August		15 August	
Event ↓	M	E	M	E	M	E	M	E	M	E	M	E
50 metre freestyle											H	F
100 metre freestyle							H	F				
200 metre freestyle					H	F						
400 metre freestyle									H	F		
800 metre freestyle					TF	TF						
1500 metre freestyle											TF	TF
50 metre backstroke							H	F				
100 metre backstroke					H	F						
200 metre backstroke									H	F		
50 metre breaststroke									H	F		
100 metre breaststroke							H	F				
200 metre breaststroke											H	F
50 metre butterfly					H	F						
100 metre butterfly									H	F		
200 metre butterfly					H	F						
200 metre individual medley											H	F
400 metre individual medley							H	F				
4 × 100 metre freestyle relay										TF		
4 × 200 metre freestyle relay								TF				
4 × 100 metre medley relay												TF
10 km open water	F											

Women
Date →	10 August		11 August		12 August		13 August		14 August		15 August	
Event ↓	M	E	M	E	M	E	M	E	M	E	M	E
50 metre freestyle											H	F
100 metre freestyle							H	F				
200 metre freestyle					H	F						
400 metre freestyle									H	F		
800 metre freestyle											TF	TF
1500 metre freestyle					TF	TF						
50 metre backstroke							H	F				
100 metre backstroke					H	F						
200 metre backstroke									H	F		
50 metre breaststroke									H	F		
100 metre breaststroke							H	F				
200 metre breaststroke											H	F
50 metre butterfly					H	F						
100 metre butterfly									H	F		
200 metre butterfly					H	F						
200 metre individual medley											H	F
400 metre individual medley							H	F				
4 × 100 metre freestyle relay										TF		
4 × 200 metre freestyle relay								TF				
4 × 100 metre medley relay												TF
10 km open water	F											

Mixed
Date →	10 August		11 August		12 August		13 August		14 August		15 August	
Event ↓	M	E	M	E	M	E	M	E	M	E	M	E
4 × 100 metre medley relay						TF						

== Medal table ==
* Host nation (United States)

Rank	Nation	Gold	Silver	Bronze	Total
1	United States*	19	22	9	50
2	Australia	15	11	9	35
3	Canada	3	4	6	13
4	Japan	3	3	6	12
5	China	2	2	3	7
6	Germany	1	0	0	1
7	South Africa	0	1	1	2
8	Mexico	0	1	0	1
9	Brazil	0	0	3	3
9	New Zealand	0	0	3	3
11	Argentina	0	0	1	1
11	Italy	0	0	1	1
Totals (12 entries)		43	44	42	129

== Medalists ==
=== Men's events ===
Event	Gold		Silver		Bronze	
50 m freestyle	Jamie Jack; Australia	21.35; CR	Jack Alexy; United States	21.42	Guilherme Caribé; Brazil	21.54
100 m freestyle	Jack Alexy; United States	47.14; CR	Patrick Sammon; United States	47.62	Guilherme Caribé; Brazil	47.89
200 m freestyle	Luke Hobson; United States	1:43.85; CR	Gabriel Jett; United States	1:43.96	Zhang Zhanshuo; China	1:44.59
400 m freestyle	Samuel Short; Australia	3:40.52; CR	Zhang Zhanshuo; China	3:42.42	Aaron Shackell; United States	3:43.44
800 m freestyle	Samuel Short; Australia	7:37.02; CR	Bobby Finke; United States	7:42.52	Ben Goedemans; Australia	7:44.67
1500 m freestyle	Samuel Short; Australia	14:33.97; CR, OC	Kazushi Imafuku; Japan	14:42.59; NR	Bobby Finke; United States	14:44.26
50 m backstroke	Quintin McCarty; United States	24.51; CR	Isaac Cooper; Australia	24.59	Will Modglin; United States	24.66
100 m backstroke	Blake Tierney; Canada	53.18	Will Modglin; United States	53.37	Jack Aikins; United States	53.46
200 m backstroke	Yumeki Kojima; Japan	1:55.38	Blake Tierney; Canada	1:56.29	Ethan Ekk; Canada	1:56.85
50 m breaststroke	Sam Williamson; Australia	26.36; CR	Michael Houlie; South Africa Van Mathias; United States	26.42	Not awarded	
100 m breaststroke	Van Mathias; United States	58.02; CR	Shin Ohashi; Japan	58.54; WJ, NR	Sam Williamson; Australia	59.34
200 m breaststroke	Zac Stubblety-Cook; Australia	2:08.09	Josh Matheny; United States	2:08.25	Shin Ohashi; Japan	2:08.27
50 m butterfly	Ben Armbruster; Australia	22.75; CR	Van Mathias; United States	22.84	Guilherme Caribé; Brazil	22.88
100 m butterfly	Matthew Temple; Australia	50.39; CR	Ben Armbruster; Australia	50.59	Luca Urlando; United States	50.99
200 m butterfly	Luca Urlando; United States	1:53.11; CR	Carson Foster; United States	1:53.67	Harrison Turner; Australia	1:54.44
200 m individual medley	Tomoyuki Matsushita; Japan	1:56.02	Carson Foster; United States	1:56.37	William Petric; Australia	1:56.65
400 m individual medley	Tomoyuki Matsushita; Japan	4:06.75; CR	Carson Foster; United States	4:07.11	Bobby Finke; United States	4:07.59
4 × 100 m freestyle relay	United States; Chris Guiliano (47.51); Patrick Sammon (46.98); Destin Lasco (47.74); Jack Alexy (46.78)	3:09.01; CR	Australia; Kai Taylor (47.81); Jamie Jack (47.46); Edward Sommerville (47.31); Harrison Turner (46.99)	3:09.57	Japan; Tatsuya Murasa (48.29); Shoon Mitsunaga (47.72); Katsuhiro Matsumoto (48.08); Shuya Matsumoto (49.44)	3:13.53
4 × 200 m freestyle relay	United States; Luke Hobson (1:44.13); Aaron Shackell (1:44.23); Patrick Sammon (1:46.92); Gabriel Jett (1:44.09)	6:59.37; CR	Australia; Maximillian Giuliani (1:45.65); Kai Taylor (1:45.91); Charlie Hawke (1:44.37); Samuel Short (1:45.17)	7:01.10	Japan; Tatsuya Murasa (1:44.75); Katsuhiro Matsumoto (1:46.15); Kazusa Kuroda (1:46.72); Tomoyuki Matsushita (1:45.12)	7:02.74
4 × 100 m medley relay (Note: The United States 'B' finish in the third place swim in 3:30.83, but not eligible the medals due to per country rule and Japan earned the bronze medal.)	United States; Will Modglin (53.86); Van Mathias (57.72); Luca Urlando (50.51); Jack Alexy (46.97)	3:29.06; CR	Australia; Stuart Swinburn (54.66); Sam Williamson (58.64); Matthew Temple (49.70); Harrison Turner (47.16)	3:30.15	Japan; Hidekazu Takehera (54.09); Shin Ohashi (58.01); Shoon Mitsunaga (50.86); Tatsuya Murasa (48.03)	3:30.99
10 km open water	Florian Wellbrock; Germany	1:49:51	Paulo Strehlke; Mexico	1:49:58	Dario Verani; Italy	1:50:01

=== Women's events ===
Event	Gold		Silver		Bronze	
50 m freestyle	Kate Douglass; United States	23.19; WR	Gretchen Walsh; United States	23.74	Meg Harris; Australia	23.89
100 m freestyle	Meg Harris; Australia	52.60	Gretchen Walsh; United States	52.78	Olivia Wunsch; Australia	52.98
200 m freestyle	Lani Pallister; Australia	1:53.67; CR	Summer McIntosh; Canada	1:53.86	Erika Fairweather; New Zealand	1:55.05
400 m freestyle	Lani Pallister; Australia	3:58.42	Katie Ledecky; United States	4:00.15	Erika Fairweather; New Zealand	4:02.35
800 m freestyle	Lani Pallister; Australia	8:06.10; CR	Katie Ledecky; United States	8:07.26	Erika Fairweather; New Zealand	8:18.81
1500 m freestyle	Katie Ledecky; United States	15:36.06	Lani Pallister; Australia	15:38.62; OC	Moesha Johnson; Australia	15:53.49
50 m backstroke	Katharine Berkoff; United States	26.90; CR, AM	Regan Smith; United States	27.14	Iona Anderson; Australia	27.60
100 m backstroke	Katharine Berkoff; United States	57.93	Regan Smith; United States	58.11	Taylor Ruck; Canada	58.40
200 m backstroke	Regan Smith; United States	2:05.57	Claire Curzan; United States	2:06.44	Peng Xuwei; China	2:07.45
50 m breaststroke	Tang Qianting; China	29.67	McKenzie Siroky; United States	29.70	Skyler Smith; United States	29.90
100 m breaststroke	McKenzie Siroky; United States	1:05.32	Tang Qianting; China	1:05.46	Satomi Suzuki; Japan	1:05.65
200 m breaststroke	Alexanne Lepage; Canada	2:21.73	Kate Douglass; United States	2:22.57	Kaylene Corbett; South Africa	2:22.97
50 m butterfly	Gretchen Walsh; United States	24.65; CR	Kate Douglass; United States	25.06	Taylor Ruck; Canada	25.23; NR
100 m butterfly	Gretchen Walsh; United States	55.15; CR	Taylor Ruck; Canada	56.71	Alexandria Perkins; Australia	56.75
200 m butterfly	Brittany Castelluzzo; Australia	2:06.24	Elizabeth Dekkers; Australia	2:06.46	Tess Howley; United States	2:07.43
200 m individual medley	Yu Yiting; China	2:07.45; CR	Summer McIntosh; Canada	2:07.47	Alex Walsh; United States	2:07.66
400 m individual medley	Summer McIntosh; Canada	4:28.01; CR	Jenna Forrester; Australia	4:31.50	Agostina Hein; Argentina	4:32.54; NR
4 × 100 m freestyle relay	United States; Kate Douglass (51.69) CR, AM; Gretchen Walsh (52.23); Torri Huske (52.79); Simone Manuel (52.61)	3:29.32; CR, AM	Australia; Meg Harris (52.51); Alexandria Perkins (53.05); Milla Jansen (53.03); Olivia Wunsch (52.52)	3:31.11	Canada; Taylor Ruck (53.59); Mary-Sophie Harvey (54.20); Leah Tigert (54.04); Leilani Fack (54.61)	3:36.44
4 × 200 m freestyle relay	Australia; Inez Miller (1:55.83); Lani Pallister (1:53.46); Hannah Casey (1:57.84); Milla Jansen (1:55.27)	7:42.40; CR	United States; Erin Gemmell (1:57.00); Anna Peplowski (1:55.62); Rylee Erisman (1:56.11); Katie Ledecky (1:54.37)	7:43.10	Canada; Mary-Sophie Harvey (1:57.95); Summer McIntosh (1:55.82); Emma O'Croinin (1:59.86); Brooklyn Douthwright (1:59.11)	7:52.74
4 × 100 m medley relay	United States; Katharine Berkoff (58.35); McKenzie Siroky (1:05.07); Gretchen Walsh (54.78); Kate Douglass (52.23)	3:50.43; CR	Australia; Iona Anderson (59.23); Ella Ramsay (1:06.21); Alexandria Perkins (57.04); Meg Harris (52.61)	3:55.09	China; Wan Letian (1:00.40); Tang Qianting (1:05.70); Yu Yiting (56.49); Cheng Yujie (53.74)	3:56.33
10 km open water	Moesha Johnson; Australia	1:55:33	Airi Ebina; Japan	1:55:59	Ichika Kajimoto; Japan	1:56:07

=== Mixed events ===
Event	Gold		Silver		Bronze	
4 × 100 m medley relay	United States; Will Modglin (53.40); Van Mathias (57.30); Gretchen Walsh (54.99); Kate Douglass (51.01)	3:36.70; WR	Australia; Iona Anderson (59.14); Sam Williamson (58.50); Matthew Temple (49.60); Meg Harris (52.06)	3:39.30	Canada; Ingrid Wilm (59.73); Oliver Dawson (59.36); Finlay Knox (51.60); Taylor Ruck (52.53)	3:43.22

== Participating nations ==
A total of 24 countries entered competitors to compete in swimming.

- Argentina (4)
- Australia (38)
- Bermuda (3)
- Bolivia (1)
- Brazil (11)
- Canada (44)
- China (12)
- Chinese Taipei (5)
- Colombia (1)
- Eritrea (1)
- Germany (2)
- Guatemala (1)
- Italy (2)
- Jamaica (4)
- Japan (37)
- Mexico (9)
- (Federated States of Micronesia) Micronesia (1)
- New Zealand (17)
- Palau (1)
- Peru (1)
- Philippines (4)
- Singapore (3)
- South Africa (26)
- United States (60) (host)

Additionally, four European swimmers (two from Germany and two from Italy) were permitted to compete in open water events. Bolivia also entered only one competitor in men's open water.

Australian swimmers Mollie O'Callaghan and Kaylee McKeown withdrew from the championships due to health concerns; for O'Callaghan, who was managing a spinal stress fracture, it would have been her first appearance at the senior Pan Pacs, while McKeown was forced to pull out after being diagnosed with glandular fever.

Cameron McEvoy and Kyle Chalmers both chose not to participate in the Pan Pacific Championships, opting to focus on the 2026 Commonwealth Games instead.

A report by Swimming World highlighted several major omissions from the United States roster—including American record-holder Anna Moesch, Isabelle Stadden, Ryan Erisman, and Luka Mijatovic—due to USA Swimming selecting the team a year in advance based on 2025 competition times rather than holding a dedicated 2026 selection meet.
