= 2026 USA Swimming Championships =

- Host city: Irvine, California, U.S.
- Date: July 28 – August 1, 2026
- Venue: William Woollett Jr. Aquatics Center
- Events: 34 (men: 17; women: 17)

The 2026 Toyota National Swimming Championships were held from July 28 to August 1, 2026, at the William Woollett Jr. Aquatics Center in Irvine, California.

== Results ==
=== Men's events ===
Event	Gold		Silver		Bronze	
50 m freestyle	Caeleb Dressel	21.35	Quintin McCarty	21.75	Nikita Sheremet	21.76
100 m freestyle	Caeleb Dressel	47.70	Brooks Curry	47.81	Patrick Sammon	47.87
200 m freestyle	Ryan Erisman	1:45.23	Patrick Sammon	1:45.67	Mitchell Schott	1:45.78
400 m freestyle	Luka Mijatovic	3:43.45	Ryan Erisman	3:44.39	William Mulgrew	3:47.88
800 m freestyle	Ryan Erisman	7:43.53	William Mulgrew	7:45.21	Luka Mijatovic	7:46.57
1500 m freestyle	William Mulgrew	14:58.50	Sean Green	15:07.03	Luka Mijatovic	15:08.12
50 m backstroke	Quintin McCarty	24.73	Jack Wilkening	24.75	Ulises Saravia	24.90
100 m backstroke	Owen Mcdonald	53.43	Ulises Saravia	53.70	Jack Wilkening	53.78
200 m backstroke	David King	1:55.01	David Melnychuk	1:57.56	Michael Hochwalt	1:57.59
50 m breaststroke	Watson Nguyen	26.65	Michael Andrew	26.91	Mitch Mason	27.08
100 m breaststroke	Alexei Avakov	58.87	Nate Germonprez	59.51	Watson Nguyen	59.79
200 m breaststroke	Josh Bey	2:07.58	Gabe Nunziata	2:07.62	Finnley Conklin	2:08.94
50 m butterfly	Ilya Kharun	22.59 US, CR	Caeleb Dressel	22.86	Michael Andrew	23.07
100 m butterfly	Ilya Kharun	50.05	Caeleb Dressel	50.45	Rowan Cox	50.64
200 m butterfly	Luca Urlando	1:54.45	Ilya Kharun	1:54.59	Enzo Solitario	1:54.99
200 m individual medley	Maximus Williamson	1:56.40	Owen Mcdonald	1:57.68	Kieran Smith	1:58.36
400 m individual medley	Ryan Erisman	4:09.57	Noah Cakir	4:13.28	Michael Hochwalt	4:13.37

=== Women's events ===
Event	Gold		Silver		Bronze	
50 m freestyle	Gretchen Walsh	23.60 CR	Anna Moesch	24.05	Liberty Clark	24.28
100 m freestyle	Anna Moesch	51.88 AR, US, CR	Rylee Erisman	52.92	Liberty Clark	52.97
200 m freestyle	Anna Moesch	1:55.05	Rylee Erisman	1:55.86	Madi Mintenko	1:55.87
400 m freestyle	Madi Mintenko	4:04.54	Kate Hurst	4:06.45	Cavan Gormsen	4:07.81
800 m freestyle	Kate Hurst	8:28.33	Gena Jorgenson	8:31.18	Sydney Schoeck	8:32.44
1500 m freestyle	Katie Grimes	15:55.69	Kate Hurst	16:04.46	Gena Jorgenson	16:12.73
50 m backstroke	Isabelle Stadden	27.09	Maggie Wanezek	27.88	Rhyan White	27.93
100 m backstroke	Isabelle Stadden	58.06	Maggie Wanezek	58.76	Claire Curzan	58.83
200 m backstroke	Isabelle Stadden	2:04.76	Maggie Wanezek	2:07.08	Rylee Erisman	2:07.55
50 m breaststroke	McKenzie Siroky	29.99	Piper Enge	30.28	Anita Bottazzo	30.51
100 m breaststroke	McKenzie Siroky	1:05.64	Kate Douglass	1:05.66	Emma Weber	1:06.92
200 m breaststroke	Sophia Umstead	2:25.57	Adalene Robillard	2:26.07	Maddy Huggins	2:26.42
50 m butterfly	Brady Kendall	25.87	Mizuki Hirai	26.06	Gabi Brito	26.08
100 m butterfly	Mizuki Hirai	57.52	Hannah Bellard	58.27	Erika Pelaez Bailey Hartman	58.43
200 m butterfly	Hannah Bellard	2:06.86	Bella Sims	2:07.19	Lindsay Looney	2:07.26
200 m individual medley	Alex Walsh	2:08.59	Campbell Chase	2:10.09	Teagan O'Dell	2:10.20
400 m individual medley	Katie Grimes	4:33.26	Bella Sims	4:37.33	Sydney Schoeck	4:38.68
