= List of Pan Pacific Championships records in swimming =

The fastest swims recorded at the Pan Pacific Swimming Championships are listed by the championship organisers in a list of records. The events are held in a long course (50 m) pool, with the last championships held in Tokyo, Japan, in August 2018.

All records were set in finals, unless noted otherwise.

== Men ==
Event	Time	Name	Nationality	Date	Location	Ref
50 m freestyle	21.35	Jamie Jack	Australia	15 August 2026	Irvine, United States	
100 m freestyle	47.14	Jack Alexy	United States	13 August 2026	Irvine, United States	
200 m freestyle	1:43.85	Luke Hobson	United States	12 August 2026	Irvine, United States	
400 m freestyle	3:40.52	Samuel Short	Australia	14 August 2026	Irvine, United States	
800 m freestyle	7:37.02	Samuel Short	Australia	12 August 2026	Irvine, United States	
1500 m freestyle	14:33.97	Samuel Short	Australia	15 August 2026	Irvine, United States	
50 m backstroke	24.51	Quintin McCarty	United States	13 August 2026	Irvine, United States	
100 m backstroke	51.94	Ryan Murphy	United States	10 August 2018	Tokyo, Japan	
200 m backstroke	1:53.57	Ryan Murphy	United States	12 August 2018	Tokyo, Japan	
50 m breaststroke	26.36	Samuel Williamson	Australia	14 August 2026	Irvine, United States	
100 m breaststroke	58.02	Van Mathias	United States	13 August 2026	Irvine, United States	
200 m breaststroke	2:07.75	Ippei Watanabe	Japan	12 August 2018	Tokyo, Japan	
50m butterfly	22.75	Ben Armbruster	Australia	12 August 2026	Irvine, United States	
100m butterfly	50.39	Matthew Temple	Australia	14 August 2026	Irvine, United States	
200m butterfly	1:53.11	Luca Urlando	United States	12 August 2026	Irvine, United States	
200m individual medley	1:54.43	Ryan Lochte	United States	21 August 2010	Irvine, United States	
400m individual medley	4:06.75	Tomoyuki Matsushita	Japan	13 August 2026	Irvine, United States	
4×100m freestyle relay	3:09.01	Chris Guiliano (47.51); Patrick Sammon (46.98); Destin Lasco (47.74); Jack Alexy (46.78)	United States	14 August 2026	Irvine, United States	
4×200m freestyle relay	6:59.37	Luke Hobson (1:44.13); Aaron Shackell (1:44.23); Patrick Sammon (1:46.92); Gabriel Jett (1:44.09)	United States	13 August 2026	Irvine, United States	
4×100m medley relay	3:29.06	Will Modglin (53.86); Van Mathias (57.72); Luca Urlando (50.51); Jack Alexy (46.97)	United States	15 August 2026	Irvine, United States	

Legend: WR – World record;
Records not set in finals: h – heat; r – relay 1st leg; rh – relay heat 1st leg; b – B final; so – swim-off

== Women ==
Event	Time		Name	Nationality	Date	Location	Ref
50m freestyle	23.19	WR	Kate Douglass	United States	15 August 2026	Irvine, United States	
100m freestyle	51.69	r	Kate Douglass	United States	14 August 2026	Irvine, United States	
200m freestyle	1:53.67		Lani Pallister	Australia	12 August 2026	Irvine, United States	
400m freestyle	3:58.37		Katie Ledecky	United States	23 August 2014	Gold Coast, Australia	
800m freestyle	8:06.10		Lani Pallister	Australia	15 August 2026	Irvine, United States	
1500m freestyle	15:28.36		Katie Ledecky	United States	24 August 2014	Gold Coast, Australia	
50m backstroke	26.90		Katharine Berkoff	United States	13 August 2026	Irvine, United States	
100m backstroke	57.86	h	Regan Smith	United States	12 August 2026	Irvine, United States	
200m backstroke	2:04.13	h	Regan Smith	United States	14 August 2026	Irvine, United States	
50m breaststroke	29.59	h	Tang Qianting	China	14 August 2026	Irvine, United States	
100m breaststroke	1:04.93		Rebecca Soni	United States	19 August 2010	Irvine, United States	
200m breaststroke	2:20.69		Rebecca Soni	United States	21 August 2010	Irvine, United States	
50m butterfly	24.65		Gretchen Walsh	United States	12 August 2026	Irvine, United States	
100m butterfly	55.15		Gretchen Walsh	United States	14 August 2026	Irvine, United States	
200m butterfly	2:05.40		Jessicah Schipper	Australia	17 August 2006	Victoria, Canada	
200m individual medley	2:07.45		Yu Yiting	China	15 August 2026	Irvine, United States	
400m individual medley	4:28.01		Summer McIntosh	Canada	13 August 2026	Irvine, United States	
4×100m freestyle relay	3:29.32		Kate Douglass (51.69); Gretchen Walsh (52.23); Torri Huske (52.79); Simone Manuel (52.61)	United States	14 August 2026	Irvine, United States	
4×200m freestyle relay	7:42.40		Inez Miller (1:55.83); Lani Pallister (1:53.46); Hannah Casey (1:57.84); Milla Jansen (1:55.27)	Australia	13 August 2026	Irvine, United States	
4×100m medley relay	3:50.43		Katharine Berkoff (58.35); McKenzie Siroky (1:05.07); Gretchen Walsh (54.78); Kate Douglass (52.23)	United States	15 August 2026	Irvine, United States	

Legend: WR – World record;
Records not set in finals: h – heat; r – relay 1st leg; rh – relay heat 1st leg; b – B final; so – swim-off

== Mixed relay ==
Event	Time		Name	Nationality	Date	Location	Ref
4×100m medley relay	3:36.70	WR	Will Modglin (53.40); Van Mathias (57.30); Gretchen Walsh (54.99); Kate Douglass (51.01)	United States	12 August 2026	Irvine, United States	

Legend: WR – World record;
Records not set in finals: h – heat; so – swim-off
