= Swimming at the 2025 Summer World University Games – Men's 4 × 100 metre medley relay =

Men's 4 × 100 metre medley relay at the 2025 Summer World University Games
- Venue: Schwimm- und Sprunghalle im Europasportpark
- Location: Berlin
- Dates: 23 July (heats and final)
- Nations: 27

Medalists
gold medal	William Modglin; Benjamin Delmar; Kamal Muhammad; Matthew King; Nathaniel Germonprez; Matthew Klinge; Owen McDonald; Mitchel Schott	United States
silver medal	Pietro Ubertalli; Alessandro Fusco; Gianmarco Sansone; Lorenzo Actis; Michele Busa; Giovanni Caserta; Flavio Mangiamele; Simone Stefanì	Italy
bronze medal	Yuga Nishimura; Reo Okura; Riku Kitagawa; Takaki Hara; Yusuke Sato; Yuma Yoshida	Japan

The men's 4 × 100 metre medley relay at the 2025 Summer World University Games in Rhine-Ruhr, Germany was held 23 July 2025. United States won the gold medal, Italy took the silver medal and Japan earned the bronze medal.

== Schedule ==
All times are Central European Time (UTC+1)

Date	Time	Round
23 July	10:12	Heats
23 July	20:48	Final

== Records ==
Prior to the competition, the world and Universiade records were as follows.

Category	Team	Record	Date	Place	Event
World record	United States	3:26.78	1 August 2021	Tokyo, Japan	2020 Summer Olympics
Universiade record	China	3:32.58	7 August 2023	Chengdu, China	2021 Summer World University Games

== Results ==
=== Heats ===
All entered teams competed across multiple seeded heats in the morning session. Teams with the top 8 fastest times advanced, regardless of which individual heat they swam.

Rank	Heat	Lane	Nation	Swimmers	Time	Notes
1	3	4	United States	Owen McDonald (54.12); Nathaniel Germonprez (59.66); Matthew Klinge (52.01); Mitchell Schott (48.63)	3:34.42	Q
2	3	5	Germany	Cornelius Jahn (55.50); Jeremias Pock (1:01.33); Björn Kammann (51.74); Moritz Schaller (48.87)	3:37.44	Q
3	4	6	Individual Neutral Athletes	Aleksei Tkachev (54.89); Aleksei Sudarev (1:01.39); Aleksandr Shchegolev (52.68); Dmitrii Zhavoronkov (48.61)	3:37.57	Q
4	3	3	Japan	Yusuke Sato (54.46); Yuma Yoshida (1:01.32); Riku Kitagawa (52.15); Takaki Hara (50.16)	3:38.09	Q
5	4	4	Poland	Filip Kosiński (56.10); Dawid Wiekiera (1:00.83); Adrian Jaśkiewicz (52.20); Michał Pruszyński (49.90)	3:39.03	Q
6	4	3	Italy	Simone Stefanì (57.04); Flavio Mangiamele (1:01.23); Michele Busa (51.97); Giovanni Caserta (49.70)	3:39.94	Q
7	4	2	Great Britain	Alexander Casey (57.34); Christian Ryan (1:01.45); Brodie Gordon-Gibson (53.01); Maddox Roberts (48.95)	3:40.75	Q
8	4	7	Brazil	Pedro Souza (56.11); Guilherme Camossato (1:00.95); Gustavo Saldo (53.86); Theo Alloza (49.96)	3:40.88	Q
9	4	1	Canada	Collyn Gagne (56.96); Brayden Taivassalo (1:02.25); Patrick Hussey (52.57); Chris Weeks (49.43)	3:41.21	
10	3	1	Switzerland	Tiago Behar (55.90); Maël Allegrini (1:02.09); Noah Retzler (53.93); Robin Yeboah (49.67)	3:41.59	
11	3	8	Hong Kong	Hayden Kwan (55.81); Nicholas Cheung (1:00.85); Ng Cheuk Yin (54.42); Ho Siu Lun (50.63)	3:41.71	
12	2	4	South Africa	Ruard van Renen (54.66); Matthew Randle (1:02.04); Guy Brooks (54.31); Owethu Mahan (50.91)	3:41.92	
13	3	2	Chinese Taipei	Chuang Mu-lun (56.64); Liu Ching-hung (1:02.60); Wang Kuan-hung (52.54); Fan Chen-wei (50.51)	3:42.29	
14	4	8	Malaysia	Khiew Hoe Yean (56.70); Andrew Goh (1:01.41); Bryan Leong (54.82); Arvin Chahal (49.54)	3:42.47	
15	2	1	India	Srihari Nataraj (55.74); Vidith Shiva (1:01.80); Benedicton Beniston (53.81); Jashua Durai (51.60)	3:42.95	
16	4	5	South Korea	Yoon Ji-hwan (56.96); Park Geon (1:00.98); Kim Ji-hun (53.40); Han Seung-yun (51.81)	3:43.15	
17	2	5	Sweden	Vidar Carlbaum (56.15); Linus Forsgren (1:03.02); Charlie Skoglund (54.08); Erik Falk (50.24)	3:43.49	
18	2	8	Estonia	Lars Kuljus (57.35); Christopher Palvadre (1:02.14); Artur Tobler (54.31); Siim Kesküla (51.07)	3:44.87	
19	3	6	Kazakhstan	Gleb Kovalenya (57.65); Artur Mironov (1:02.94); Rishat Zhumagulov (54.40); Aibat Myrzamuratov (51.63)	3:46.62	
20	1	3	Azerbaijan	Rashad Alguliyev (59.15); Said Hamidov (1:05.55); Ramil Valizada (55.21); Abdurrahman Rustamov (51.70)	3:51.61	
21	2	6	Slovenia	Jaka Pušnik (57.62); Erik Hrovat (1:04.43); Jaš Berložnik (57.77); Arne Furlan (52.04)	3:51.86	
22	2	3	Uzbekistan	Mikhail Kleshko (1:01.41); Eldorbek Usmonov (1:03.82); Iskandar Sadullaev (54.47); Abdulazizbek Abdumajidov (52.85)	3:52.55	
23	1	5	Singapore	Brandon Yap (1:02.98); Nicholas Cheong (1:05.67); Ephraim Tan (55.94); Sage Tan (51.79)	3:56.38	
24	1	4	Ecuador	Steven Jaramillo (58.72); Derek Velasco (1:07.65); Martín Álvarez (59.21); Carlos Castillo (54.03)	3:59.61	
25	2	2	Latvia	Germans Čiļeks (59.09); Maksis Veğeris (1:09.21); Staņislavs Šakels (59.03); Jegors Mihailovs (53.73)	4:01.06	
26	2	7	Argentina	Nicolas Retrive (59.85); Enzo Macedo (1:13.22); Agustin Rasche (57.23); Gianluca Bertotto (56.17)	4:06.47	
—	3	7	Australia	—	DNS	

=== Final ===
The fastest 8 teams competed in a single race to determine the gold, silver and bronze medalists.

Rank	Lane	Nation	Swimmers	Time	Notes
1st place, gold medalist(s)	4	United States	William Modglin (53.40); Benjamin Delmar (59.83); Kamal Muhammad (52.89); Matthew King (47.47)	3:33.59	
2nd place, silver medalist(s)	7	Italy	Pietro Ubertalli (54.27); Alessandro Fusco (59.79); Gianmarco Sansone (51.69); Lorenzo Actis (48.95)	3:34.70	
3rd place, bronze medalist(s)	6	Japan	Yuga Nishimura (55.00); Reo Okura (59.38); Riku Kitagawa (52.12); Takaki Hara (48.47)	3:34.97	
4	3	Individual Neutral Athletes	Aleksei Tkachev (54.47); Aleksei Sudarev (1:00.92); Aleksandr Shchegolev (52.79); Dmitrii Zhavoronkov (48.00)	3:36.18	
5	2	Poland	Aleksander Sienkiewicz (55.56); Dawid Wiekiera (1:00.03); Adrian Jaśkiewicz (51.83); Dominik Dudys (48.90)	3:36.32	
6	5	Germany	Cornelius Jahn (54.89); Jeremias Pock (1:01.23); Björn Kammann (52.12); Ole Eidam (48.23)	3:36.47	
7	8	Brazil	Pedro Souza (55.98); Guilherme Camossato (1:00.60); Gustavo Saldo (54.99); Theo Alloza (50.05)	3:41.62	
—	1	Great Britain	Alexander Casey (56.49); Archie Goodburn; Brodie Gordon-Gibson; Maddox Roberts	DSQ	
