= Quintin McCarty =

American swimmer (born 2003)

Personal information
- National team: United States
- Born: November 29, 2003 (age 22)

Sport
- Sport: Swimming
- Strokes: Backstroke
- College team: North Carolina State University
Medal record
Men's swimming
Representing the United States
Pan Pacific Championships
Gold medal – first place	2026 Irvine	50 m backstroke

Quintin McCarty (born November 29, 2003) is an American competitive swimmer. He currently competes at the collegiate level for the NC State Wolfpack.

== Career ==
McCarty competes at the collegiate level for NC State. During the 2026 Atlantic Coast Conference (ACC) Championships, he helped NC State win the 200 freestyle relay with an ACC, meet, and school record time of 1:14.02. He swam the free leg with an 18.19 second split, the fastest on the team.

In June 2025, he competed at the 2025 USA Swimming Championships and won gold in the 50 meter backstroke with a time of 24.34 seconds. As a result, he qualified to represent the United States at the 2025 World Aquatics Championships. During his World Aquatics Championships debut he finished in fifth place in the 50 meter backstroke with a time of 24.58 seconds.

In July 2026, he competed at the 2026 USA Swimming Championships and won gold in the 50 meter backstroke with a time 24.73 seconds, and qualified to represent the United States at the 2026 Pan Pacific Swimming Championships. During the Pan Pacific Championships he won a gold medal in the 50 meter backstroke with a Pan Pacific Championships record time of 24.51 seconds.
