= Van Mathias =

American swimmer (born 2000)

Personal information
- National team: United States
- Born: August 24, 2000 (age 26)

Sport
- Sport: Swimming
- Strokes: Breaststroke, Butterfly
- Club: Multinomah Athletic Club
- College team: Indiana University
Medal record
Men's swimming
Representing the United States
Pan Pacific Championships
Gold medal – first place	2026 Irvine	100 m breastroke
Gold medal – first place	2026 Irvine	4×100 m medley
Gold medal – first place	2026 Irvine	4×100 m mixed medley
Silver medal – second place	2026 Irvine	50 m butterfly
Silver medal – second place	2026 Irvine	50 m breaststroke

Van Mathias (born August 24, 2000) is an American swimmer and world record holder. He swam collegiately for Indiana University. He won five medals at the 2026 Pan Pacific Swimming Championships, including three gold medals.

== Early life and education ==
Mathias was born to Chris Mathias and Nabcy Maxwell, and has two brothers, Khalif-Munir Kalahiki and Nabil Kalahiki. He attended Beaverton High School in Portland, Oregon, where he swam for Judy Rusaw.

He swam for the Indiana Hoosiers for five seasons under head coach Ray Looze. After the 2023 NCAA Division I Men's Swimming and Diving Championships he retired from swimming, and later became the director of operations for the Hoosiers swim and dive program.

== Career ==
In 2025, he returned to part-time training. On June 17, 2026, during the 2026 USA Swimming Pro Swim Series, he set an Americas record in the 50 meter breaststroke with a time of 26.30 seconds. On June 20, 2026, he set an Americas record in the 100 meter breaststroke with a time of 58.01 seconds.

In August 2026, he competed at the 2026 Pan Pacific Swimming Championships and won a total of three golds and two silver medals. He won a gold medal in the 100 meter breaststroke with a Pan Pacific Championships record time of 58.02 seconds. He also won gold medals in the 4 × 100 meter medley relay and the 4 × 100 meter mixed medley. During the mixed medley he had a 57.30 split to put the Americans back in world record contention and extend their lead over the field, finishing with a world record time of 3:36.70. He won silver medals in the 50 meter butterfly, with a personal best time of 22.84 seconds, and the 50 meter breaststroke, with a time of 26.42 seconds.

In October 2026, he competed at the 2026 USA Swimming Short Course World Championship trials. During the prelims of the 100 meter breaststroke he set a new U.S. Open and American record with a time of 55.48 seconds. During the final he finished with a world record time of 55.14 seconds.
