= Swimming at the 2025 Summer World University Games – Mixed 4 × 100 metre medley relay =

Mixed 4 × 100 metre medley relay at the 2025 Summer World University Games
- Venue: Schwimm- und Sprunghalle im Europasportpark
- Location: Berlin
- Dates: 19 July (heats and final)
- Nations: 20

Medalists
gold medal	William Modglin; Benjamin Delmar; Leah Shackley; Maxine Parker; Nathaniel Germonprez; Isabel Ivey; David King; Ella Welch	United States
silver medal	Adela Piskorska; Dawid Wiekiera; Adrian Jaśkiewicz; Julia Maik; Dominik Dudys; Barbara Mazurkiewicz; Wiktoria Piotrowska; Aleksander Sienkiewicz	Poland
bronze medal	Ruard van Renen; Simone Moll; Guy Brooks; Olivia Nel; Michaela de Villiers	South Africa

The mixed 4 × 100 metre medley relay at the 2025 Summer World University Games in Rhine-Ruhr, Germany was held 19 July 2025. United States won the gold medal, Poland took the silver medal and South Africa earned the bronze medal.

== Schedule ==
All times are Central European Time (UTC+1)

Date	Time	Round
19 July	10:38	Heats
19 July	20:52	Final

== Records ==
Prior to the competition, the world and Universiade records were as follows.

Category	Team	Record	Date	Place	Event
World record	United States	3:37.43	3 August 2024	Paris, France	2024 Summer Olympics
Universiade record	China	3:44.02	2 August 2023	Chengdu, China	2021 Summer World University Games

== Results ==
=== Heats ===
All entered teams competed across multiple seeded heats in the morning session. Teams with the top 8 fastest times advanced, regardless of which individual heat they swam.

Rank	Heat	Lane	Nation	Swimmers	Time	Notes
1	3	4	United States	David King (53.91); Nathaniel Germonprez (1:54.03); Ella Welch (2:52.58); Isabel Ivey (3:46.34)	3:46.34	Q
2	2	3	Italy	Pietro Ubertalli (54.44); Francesca Zucca (2:01.87); Gianmarco Sansone (2:53.83); Agata Ambler (3:49.28)	3:49.28	Q
3	2	4	Japan	Nanami Ito (1:01.61); Reo Okura (2:01.91); Riku Kitagawa (2:54.19); Sakura Ohshima (3:49.64)	3:49.64	Q
4	3	5	Germany	Cornelius Jahn (54.69); Kim Herkle (2:04.26); Ole Eidam (2:56.01); Nicole Maier (3:51.13)	3:51.13	Q
5	3	2	South Africa	Ruard van Renen (54.37); Simone Moll (2:02.27); Guy Brooks (2:55.92); Michaela de Villiers (3:51.25)	3:51.25	Q
6	3	3	Poland	Aleksander Sienkiewicz (55.40); Barbara Mazurkiewicz (2:03.09); Wiktoria Piotrowska (3:02.38); Dominik Dudys (3:51.49)	3:51.49	Q
7	3	7	Switzerland	Gaia Rasmussen (1:03.74); Maël Allegrini (2:05.72); Julia Ullmann (3:05.59); Tiago Behar (3:55.49)	3:55.49	Q
8	1	1	Sweden	Charlie Skoglund (56.90); Moa Bergdahl (2:05.60); Hanna Bergman (3:06.25); Erik Albin Falk (3:55.75)	3:55.75	Q
9	2	5	South Korea	Kim Seong-ju (56.36); Park Geon (1:58.37); Yang Ha-jung (3:00.06); Hong Jin-yeong (3:56.56)	3:56.56	
10	2	7	Turkey	Sudem Denizli (1:02.08); Hazal Özkan (2:13.01); Polat Uzer Turnalı (3:07.39); Emre Gürdenli (3:57.99)	3:57.99	
11	1	5	Slovenia	Primož Šenica (56.77); Sara Mihalič (2:08.74); Tia Primc (3:09.83); Jaka Pušnik (4:01.04)	4:01.04	
12	2	1	Hong Kong	Cindy Cheung (1:03.02); Lam Hoi Kiu (2:15.86); Ng Cheuk Yin (3:10.26); Ho Siu Lun (4:01.08)	4:01.08	
13	3	1	Austria	Leon Opatril (56.36); Cornelia Pammer (2:09.63); Andreas Rizek (3:02.38); Johanna Enkner (4:01.60)	4:01.60	
14	1	2	Slovakia	Laura Benková (1:06.82); Phillip Osadský (2:10.28); Zora Ripková (3:11.79); Ondrej Duša (4:02.66)	4:02.66	
15	1	4	Latvia	Ieva Maļuka (1:03.16); Kristaps Miķelsons (2:05.58); Staņislavs Šakels (3:02.47); Kristiāna Maskava-Pudāne (4:04.29)	4:04.29	
16	1	8	Singapore	Ashley Lim (1:08.53); Nicholas Cheong (2:13.80); Yeo Chiok Sze (3:14.66); Sage Tan (4:05.37)	4:05.37	
17	1	6	Argentina	Nicolas Retrive (59.93); Martina Barbeito (2:11.34); Agustin Rasche (3:08.53); Aixa Recchioni (4:08.89)	4:08.89	
18	1	3	Chile	Patricio Bobadilla (58.62); Antonia Cubillos (2:14.78); Elías Ardiles (3:08.88); Fernanda Reyes (4:08.94)	4:08.94	
19	1	7	Ecuador	María Contreras (1:04.98); Derek Velasco (2:12.30); Martín Álvarez (3:10.51); Kimberly Uyaguari (4:10.81)	4:10.81	
20	2	8	India	Pratyasa Ray (1:06.99); Yadesh Suresh (2:12.01); Nina Venkatesh (3:19.26); Jashua Durai (4:12.70)	4:12.70	

=== Final ===
The fastest 8 teams competed in a single race to determine the gold, silver and bronze medalists.

Rank	Lane	Nation	Swimmers	Time	Notes
1st place, gold medalist(s)	4	United States	William Modglin (52.83); Benjamin Delmar (1:52.91); Leah Shackley (2:50.84); Maxine Parker (3:44.40)	3:44.40	
2nd place, silver medalist(s)	7	Poland	Adela Piskorska (1:00.31); Dawid Wiekiera (1:59.88); Adrian Jaśkiewicz (2:51.91); Julia Maik (3:47.14)	3:47.14	
3rd place, bronze medalist(s)	2	South Africa	Ruard Van Renen (54.24); Simone Moll (2:01.47); Guy Connor Brooks (2:54.65); Olivia Nel (3:48.34)	3:48.34	
4	5	Italy	Federica Toma (1:01.14); Alessandro Fusco (2:01.57); Viola Scotto di Carlo (2:59.78); Lorenzo Actis Dato (3:48.65)	3:48.65	
5	3	Japan	Aimi Nagaoka (1:01.81); Reo Okura (2:01.99); Uran Noda (3:01.34); Takaki Hara (3:49.69)	3:49.69	
6	6	Germany	Cornelius Jahn (54.78); Kim Herkle (2:04.78); Ole Eidam (2:56.23); Nicole Maier (3:51.13)	3:51.13	
7	8	Sweden	Charlie Skoglund (56.59); Moa Bergdahl (2:04.51); Hanna Bergman (3:05.23); Erik Falk (3:54.93)	3:54.93	
—	1	Switzerland	Gaia Rasmussen (1:02.75); Maël Allegrini (2:04.75); Julia Ullmann; Tiago Behar	DSQ	
