= Luke Brennan =

Luke Brennan may refer to:

- Luke Brennan (Australian footballer) (born 1985), Australian rules footballer for Hawthorn and Sydney
- Luke Brennan (English footballer) (born 2001), English footballer for Blackburn Rovers
- Luke Brennan (soccer, born 2005), American soccer player for Atlanta United
