= James Darcy =

James Darcy may refer to:

- James Darcy (1617–1673), English politician
- James Darcy, 1st Baron Darcy of Navan (c. 1650–1731), his son, British politician and peer
- James Darcy (New York politician) (1834–1863), member of the New York State Assembly
- James Riabhach Darcy, mayor of Galway, 1602–1603
- Jim Darcy (1875–1932), Australian rules footballer

== See also ==
- James D'Arcy, English actor
- Brian d'Arcy James (born 1968), American actor and musician
