= Jamie Jack (swimmer) =

Australian swimmer (born 2002)

Personal information
- Nationality: Australian
- Born: 19 September 2002 (age 24)

Sport
- Sport: Swimming
- Strokes: Freestyle
Medal record
Men's swimming
Representing Australia
Commonwealth Games
Gold medal – first place	2026 Glasgow	4×100 m freestyle
Gold medal – first place	2026 Glasgow	4×100 m medley
Bronze medal – third place	2026 Glasgow	50 m freestyle
Pan Pacific Championships
Gold medal – first place	2026 Irvine	50 m freestyle
Silver medal – second place	2026 Irvine	4×100 m freestyle

Jamie Jack (born 19 September 2002) is an Australian swimmer.

== Career ==
In June 2026, he competed at the 2026 Australian Swimming Trials and won a silver medal in the 50 metre freestyle. As a result, he was selected to represent Australia at the 2026 Commonwealth Games and 2026 Pan Pacific Swimming Championships. During the Commonwealth Games he won a gold medal in the 4×100 m freestyle. He swam the fastest leg during the heats for Australia with a time of 48.36 seconds. He then competed in the 50 metre freestyle. During the semifinals he finished with the fastest time of 21.55 seconds. During the finals he won a bronze medal with a time of 21.47 seconds.

== Personal life ==
Jack's older sister, Shayna, is an Olympic swimmer.
