= Gabriel Jett =

American swimmer (born 2002)

Personal information
- Full name: Gabriel Tanner Jett
- National team: United States
- Born: October 14, 2002 (age 24) Augusta, Georgia, U.S.
- Height: 6 ft 2 in (188 cm)
- Weight: 185 lb (84 kg)

Sport
- Sport: Swimming
- Strokes: Freestyle (primary); Medley, Butterfly, Backstroke (U. Cal.)
- Club: Clovis Swim Club
- College team: University of California, Berkeley
- Coach: John McGough (Clovis Swim); Dave Durden (U. Cal. Berkeley)
Medal record
Men's swimming
Representing the United States
Pan Pacific Championships
| Gold medal – first place | 2026 Irvine | 4×200 m freestyle |
| Silver medal – second place | 2026 Irvine | 200 m freestyle |

Gabriel Tanner Jett (born October 14, 2002) is an American competitive swimmer who competed for the University of California Berkeley and won a gold and silver medal at the 2026 Pan Pacific Championships in Irvine, California in 2026.

== Early life and education ==
Jett was born on October 14, 2002 in Augusta, Georgia to Scott Jett, who worked as a Dental Surgeon and Kristie Kreuger Jett, one of four siblings that included Chrissy, Sierra and Bek. From a strong family of swimmers, his parents, who were primarily sprinters, and his sister, Sierra, all swam collegiately at Auburn. His father was an All American sixteen times, and his mother fifteen. Gabriel attended Clovis North High School in Clovis, California, graduating in 2021, and competing for the team in his Senior Year. Coached by John McGough as a 16-year old in mid-June, 2019, he represented the Clovis Swim Club, competing in the TYR pro swim series at the Clovis North Aquatics Complex. With the Clovis Swim Club, he held 16 age group records, and captained the team in 2020-21. A multi-stroke competitor in High School, he won titles in the 100, 200 and 400-meter freestyle, as well as the 200-meter Individual Medley, and the 100-meter back in College Station, as part of Speedo's Championship Series in 2020.

== University of California Berkeley ==
Jett attended the University of California Berkeley, enrolling as a Freshman in 2021, and competed under Head Coach Dave Durden through 2025. He majored in Film and Media. During Jett's tenure with the team, UC Berkeley won NCAA National Championships in 2023, 2022, and were runner-ups in 2024. In conference tournaments, he was part of a PAC-12 team championship in 2022, and was a Pac-12 champion 200 fly, 500 freestyle, and 200 freestyle relay in 2023. As a Cal Senior, on March 26, 2025, during the 2025 NCAA Division I Men's Swimming and Diving Championships, Jett set an NCAA championships and U.S. Open record in the 800-yard freestyle relay with a time of 5:59.75. He also won a bronze medal in the 200 freestyle with a time of 1:30.08, the second-fastest time in Cal history.

=== 2026 Pan Pacifics ===
In August 2026, he competed at the 2026 Pan Pacific Swimming Championships and set a Pan Pacific Championships record time of 6:59.37 in the 4×200 meter freestyle relay. He swam the final leg in 1:44.09 to help the United States win gold. He also won a silver medal in the 200 meter freestyle with a time of 1:43.96. He became the ninth swimmer in history to swim under 1:44 in the event.
