= Blake Tierney =

Canadian swimmer (born 2002)

Personal information
- Born: January 10, 2002 (age 24) Mississauga, Ontario, Canada
- Home town: Saskatoon, Saskatchewan, Canada

Sport
- Country: Canada
- Sport: Swimming
- Strokes: Backstroke
- Club: High Performance Centre- Vancouver
- Coach: Scott Talbot
Medal record
Men's swimming
Representing Canada
World Championships (SC)
Bronze medal – third place	2024 Budapest	4×100 m mixed medley
Pan Pacific Championships
Gold medal – first place	2026 Irvine	100 m backstroke
Silver medal – second place	2026 Irvine	200 m backstroke
Pan American Games
Silver medal – second place	2023 Santiago	4×100 m mixed medley
Bronze medal – third place	2023 Santiago	100 m backstroke
Bronze medal – third place	2023 Santiago	4×100 m freestyle
Bronze medal – third place	2023 Santiago	4×200 m freestyle
Bronze medal – third place	2023 Santiago	4×100 m medley

Blake Tierney (born January 10, 2002) is a Canadian competitive swimmer, primarily competing in the backstroke events.

== Career ==
In April 2023, Tierney was named to Canada's 2023 Pan American Games team. At the games, Tierney won five medals, including four in relays. Tierney's only individual medal came in the 100 m backstroke event.

At the 2024 Canadian Swim Trials, Tierney broke the national record in the 200 metres backstroke event, with a timing of 1:56.74. At the conclusion of the trials, Tierney was named to Canada's 2024 Olympics team.
