= McKenzie Siroky =

American swimmer (born 2005)

Personal information
- National team: United States
- Born: May 23, 2005 (age 21) Livonia, Michigan, U.S.

Sport
- Sport: Swimming
- Strokes: Breaststroke
- College team: University of Tennessee
Medal record
Women's swimming
Representing the United States
Pan Pacific Championships
| Gold medal – first place | 2026 Irvine | 100 m breaststroke |
| Gold medal – first place | 2026 Irvine | 4×100 m medley |
| Silver medal – second place | 2026 Irvine | 50 m breaststroke |

McKenzie Siroky (born May 23, 2005) is an American swimmer. She currently competes at the collegiate level for the Tennessee Volunteers.

== Early life and education ==
Siroky attended Adlai E. Stevenson High School in Livonia, Michigan where she played ice hockey, competing on the high school boys’ varsity team. During her junior year of high school, she committed to play college ice hockey at the University of Minnesota Duluth. She was in consideration to make team USA's roster for the 2022 IIHF U18 Women's World Championship, however, she didn't make the final cut.

She also swam in high school, winning three Michigan high school state titles in the 100 breast and breaking the state record twice. In February 2023, she officially decided to give up ice hockey to focus on swimming. She committed to swim at the University of Tennessee for the fall of 2024. She also chose to take a gap year to qualify for the Olympic trials.

== Career ==
In July 2026, she competed at the 2026 USA Swimming Championships and won the national title in the 50 meter breaststroke with a time of 29.99 seconds. She also won the national title in the 100 meter breaststroke with a time of 1:05.64, defeating Kate Douglass by two hundredths of a second. In August 2026, she competed at the 2026 Pan Pacific Swimming Championships and won a gold medal in the 100 meter breaststroke with a time of 1:05.32.

== Personal life ==
Siroky's mother, Michele Ann Siroky, swam at Stevenson High and Michigan State University. Michele died from brain cancer in 2017, when McKenzie was 12 years old.

Roommates at the University of Tennessee with legendary manager of the Swim and Dive team Shelby Pautsch, South African swimmer Simone Moll, and fellow Team USA swimmer Camille Spink.
