= Patrick Sammon =

American swimmer (born 2003)

Personal information
- National team: United States
- Born: August 6, 2003 (age 23) El Dorado Hills, California, U.S.

Sport
- Sport: Swimming
- Strokes: freestyle
- College team: Arizona State University
Medal record
Men's swimming
Representing the United States
World Championships (LC)
Gold medal – first place	2025 Singapore	4×100 m mixed freestyle
Bronze medal – third place	2025 Singapore	4×100 m freestyle
Pan Pacific Championships
Gold medal – first place	2026 Irvine	4×100 m freestyle
Gold medal – first place	2026 Irvine	4×200 m freestyle
Silver medal – second place	2026 Irvine	100 m freestyle

Patrick Sammon (born August 6, 2003) is an American competitive swimmer. At the 2025 World Aquatics Championships, he won a gold medal in the mixed 4×100 metre freestyle relay. He currently competes at the collegiate level for Arizona State University.

== Career ==
In 2021, Sammon committed to Arizona State University where he is a member of the swim team.

=== 2024 ===
During the 2024 NCAA Division I Men's Swimming and Diving Championships, Sammon won a gold medal in the 400 freestyle relay with an NCAA record time of 2:43.40 and helped Arizona State win their first NCAA swimming and diving championship in program history.

=== 2025 ===
At the 2025 USA Swimming Championships, he placed second in the 100-meter freestyle with a personal-best time of 47.47. As a result, he was named to team USA's roster for the 2025 World Aquatics Championships. During the competition he won a gold medal in the mixed 4×100 metre freestyle relay with a world record time of 3:18.48.

=== 2026 ===
In August, he competed at the 2026 Pan Pacific Swimming Championships and won a gold medal in the 4×200 meter freestyle relay with a Pan Pacific Championships record time of 6:59.37.
