= Will Modglin =

American swimmer (born 2004)

Personal information
- National team: United States
- Born: April 26, 2004 (age 22)

Sport
- Sport: Swimming
- Strokes: Backstroke, Breaststroke
- College team: University of Texas at Austin
Medal record
Men's swimming
Representing the United States
Pan Pacific Championships
Gold medal – first place	2026 Irvine	4×100 m mixed medley
Gold medal – first place	2026 Irvine	4×100 m medley
Silver medal – second place	2026 Irvine	100 m backstroke
Bronze medal – third place	2026 Irvine	50 m backstroke
World University Games
Gold medal – first place	2025 Rhine-Ruhr	4x100 m medley
Gold medal – first place	2025 Rhine-Ruhr	4x100 m mixed medley
Silver medal – second place	2025 Rhine-Ruhr	100 m backstroke

Will Modglin (born April 26, 2004) is an American swimmer. He currently competes at the collegiate level for the Texas Longhorns.

== Early life and education ==
Modglin was born to Chris and Michele Modglin, and has two brothers, Sanders and Coleman. He attended Zionsville Community High School in Zionsville, Indiana. He was named the 2023 USA Today High School Swimmer of the Year and the No. 1 recruit in the class of 2023.

== Career ==
Modglin swims collegiately for the Texas Longhorns. During his freshman year he won the 100 back consolation final at the NCAA Championships, breaking the Big 12 record with a time of 44.20. He also earned honorable mention All-American honors in the 200 back, 200 medley relay and 400 free relay. He was subsequently named the Big 12 Newcomer of the Year. During the 2025 NCAA Division I Men's Swimming and Diving Championships, he helped Texas win the 200 medley relay with a program record time of 1:20.28. In November 2025, he competed at the Texas Hall of Fame Invitational and broke the American record with a 43.26 swim in the 100-yard backstroke.

In August 2026, he competed at the 2026 Pan Pacific Swimming Championships and won a gold medal in the 4 × 100 meter mixed medley with a world record time of 3:36.70. He led off the Americans with a 53.40 backstroke split. This was three hundredths off his 100 meter backstroke finals time of 53.37, but still put the United States in the overall lead.
