= List of world records in swimming =

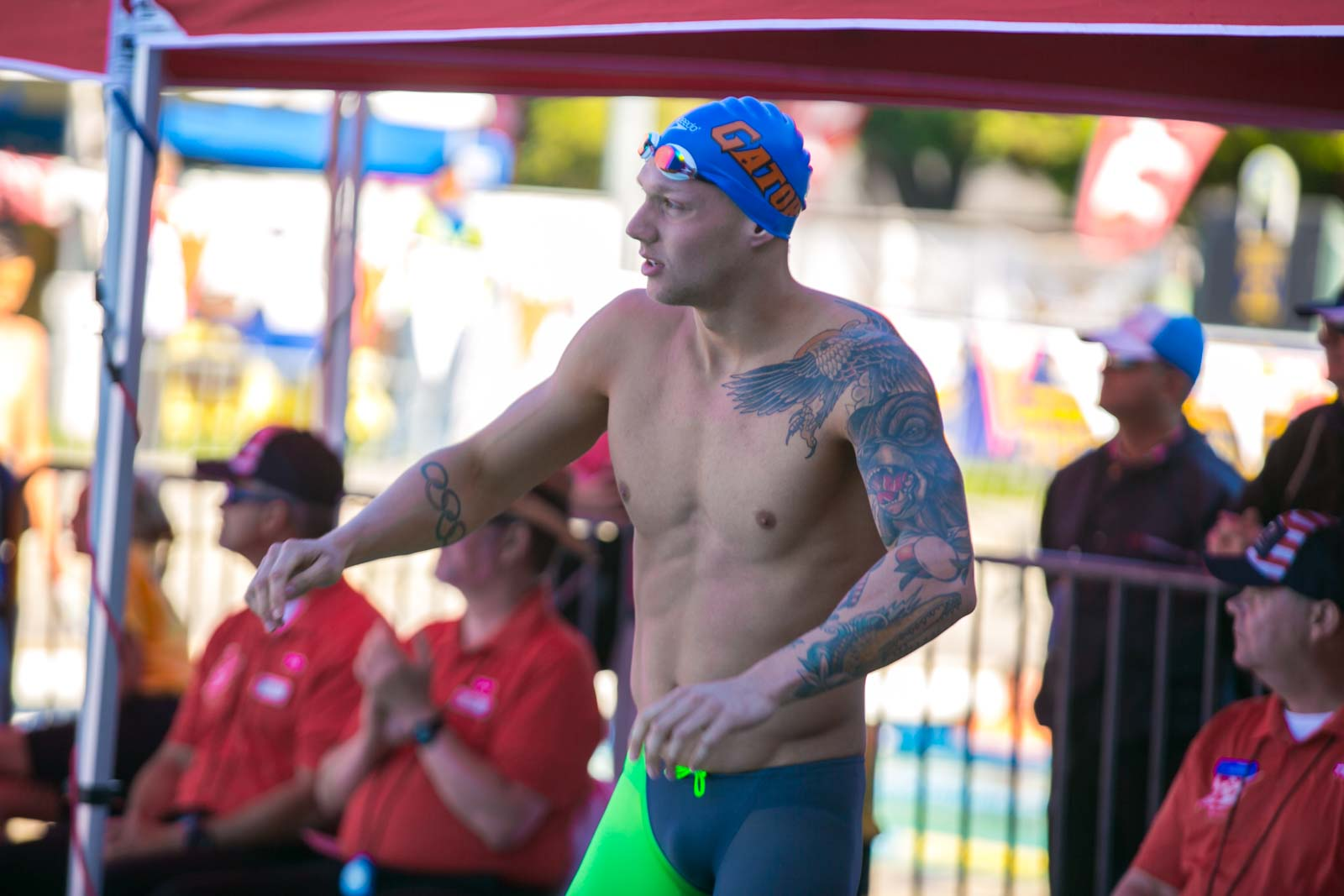
Caeleb Dressel (pictured) holds the most world records in men's swimming with four (two individual and two relays). Léon Marchand holds the most individual world records, with three.

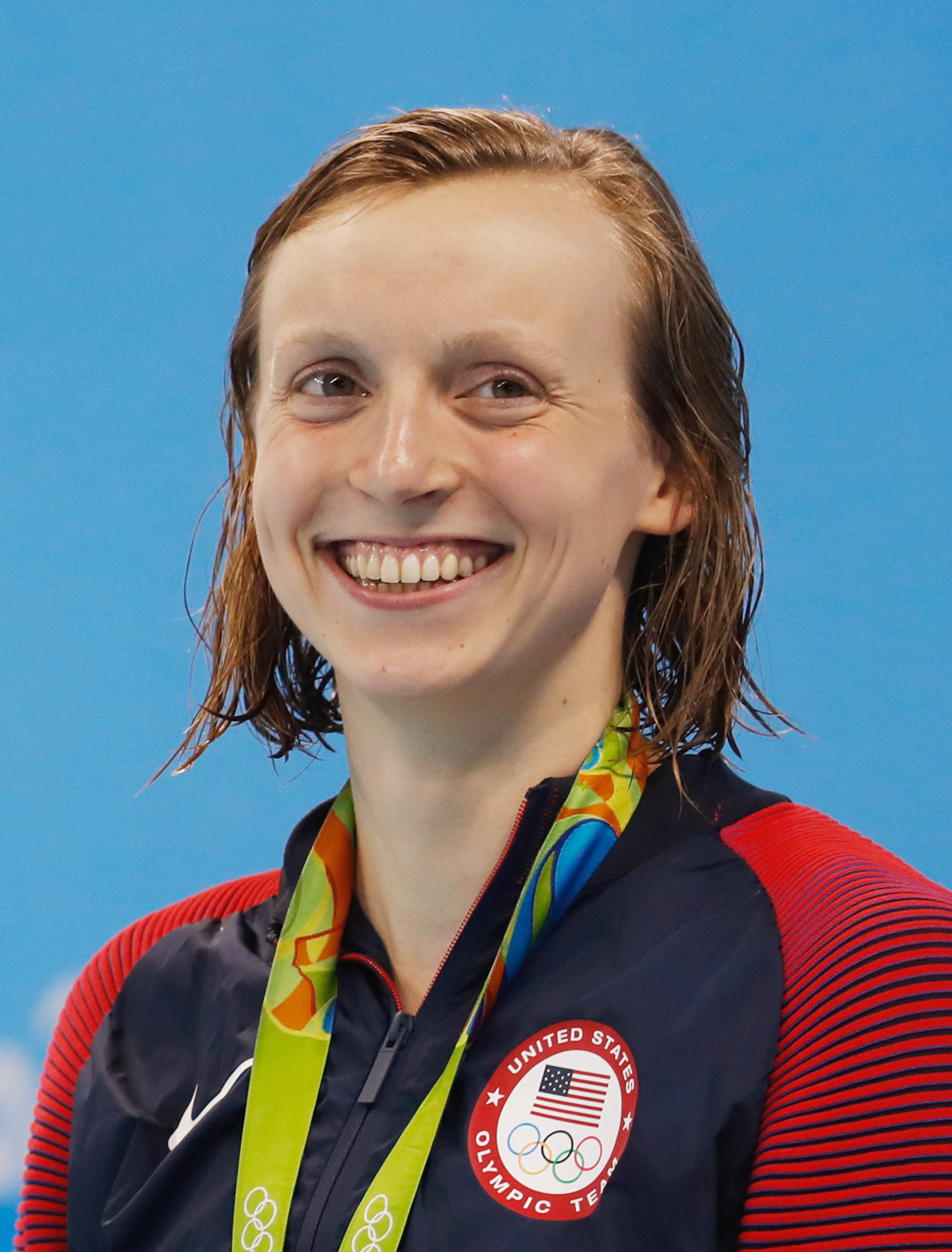
Katie Ledecky (pictured) holds two long course world records (three total). Kate Douglass (five individual and six relays) holds the most world records, with eleven. Summer McIntosh holds the most individual world records, with seven.

The world records in swimming are ratified by World Aquatics (formerly known as FINA), the international governing body of swimming. Records can be set in long course (50 metres) or short course (25 metres) swimming pools. World Aquatics recognizes world records in the following events for both men and women, except for the mixed relays, where teams consist of two men and two women, in any order.

- Freestyle: 50m, 100m, 200m, 400m, 800m, 1500m
- Backstroke: 50m, 100m, 200m
- Breaststroke: 50m, 100m, 200m
- Butterfly: 50m, 100m, 200m
- Individual medley: 100m (short course only), 200m, 400m
- Relays: 4 × 50 m freestyle relay (short course only), 4 × 100 m freestyle, 4 × 200 m freestyle, 4 × 50 m medley relay (short course only), 4 × 100 m medley
- Mixed relays: 4 × 50 m mixed freestyle (short course only), 4 × 100 m mixed freestyle (long course only), 4 × 50 m mixed medley (short course only), 4 × 100 m mixed medley (long course only)

The ratification process is described in FINA Rule SW12, and involves submission of paperwork certifying the accuracy of the timing system and the length of the pool, satisfaction of FINA rules regarding swimwear and a negative doping test by the swimmer(s) involved. Records can be set at intermediate distances in an individual race and for the first leg of a relay race. Records which have not yet been fully ratified are marked with a '#' symbol in these lists.

Some of the records below were established by swimmers wearing bodysuits or suits made of polyurethane or other non-textile materials allowed in the race pool from February 2008 until December 2009. On the eve of the 2009 FINA World Championships in Rome, the international governing body for five Olympic aquatic sports voted to ban the use of bodysuits and all suits made of non-textile materials starting 1 January 2010. The suits seemed to improve the performance in those with larger physiques, boosting performance in some athletes more than others, depending on morphology and physiology. Since then, best times set by swimmers wearing textile materials have once again overtaken more than half of the world records recognized by World Aquatics.

On 25 July 2013, FINA Technical Swimming Congress voted to allow world records in the long course mixed 400 free relay and mixed 400 medley relay, as well as in six events in short course metres: the mixed 200 medley and 200 free relays, as well as the men's and women's 200 free relays and the men's and women's 200 medley relays. In October 2013, FINA decided to establish "standards" before something can be recognized as the first World Record in these events. But later on 13 March 2014 FINA has officially ratified the eight world records set by Indiana University swimmers at the IU Relay Rally held on 26 September 2013 in Bloomington.

== Long course (50m pool) ==
=== Men ===
Event	Time		Name	Nationality	Date	Meet	Location	Ref
50m freestyle	20.88		Cameron McEvoy	Australia	20 March 2026	China Open	Shenzhen, China	
100m freestyle	46.40		Pan Zhanle	China	31 July 2024	Olympic Games	Paris, France	
200m freestyle	1:42.00	ss	Paul Biedermann	Germany	28 July 2009	World Championships	Rome, Italy	
400m freestyle	3:39.96		Lukas Märtens	Germany	12 April 2025	Swim Open Stockholm	Stockholm, Sweden	
800m freestyle	7:32.12	ss	Zhang Lin	China	29 July 2009	World Championships	Rome, Italy	
1500m freestyle	14:26.79		Johannes Liebmann	Germany	15 August 2026	European Championships	Paris, France	
50m backstroke	23.55	sf	Kliment Kolesnikov	Russia	27 July 2023	Russian Cup	Kazan, Russia	
100m backstroke	51.60		Thomas Ceccon	Italy	20 June 2022	World Championships	Budapest, Hungary	
200m backstroke	1:51.92	ss	Aaron Peirsol	United States	31 July 2009	World Championships	Rome, Italy	
50m breaststroke	25.95	sf	Adam Peaty	Great Britain	25 July 2017	World Championships	Budapest, Hungary	
100m breaststroke	56.88	sf	Adam Peaty	Great Britain	21 July 2019	World Championships	Gwangju, South Korea	
200m breaststroke	2:04.83		Shin Ohashi	Japan	24 September 2026	Asian Games	Tokyo, Japan	
50m butterfly	22.27		Andriy Govorov	Ukraine	1 July 2018	Sette Colli Trophy	Rome, Italy	
100m butterfly	49.45		Caeleb Dressel	United States	31 July 2021	Olympic Games	Tokyo, Japan	
200m butterfly	1:50.34		Kristóf Milák	Hungary	21 June 2022	World Championships	Budapest, Hungary	
200m individual medley	1:52.69	sf	Léon Marchand	France	30 July 2025	World Championships	Singapore, Singapore	
400m individual medley	4:02.50		Léon Marchand	France	23 July 2023	World Championships	Fukuoka, Japan	
4 × 100 m freestyle relay	3:08.24	ss	Michael Phelps (47.51); Garrett Weber-Gale (47.02); Cullen Jones (47.65); Jason Lezak (46.06)	United States	11 August 2008	Olympic Games	Beijing, China	
4 × 200 m freestyle relay	6:58.55	ss	Michael Phelps (1:44.49); Ricky Berens (1:44.13); David Walters (1:45.47); Ryan Lochte (1:44.46)	United States	31 July 2009	World Championships	Rome, Italy	
4 × 100 m medley relay	3:26.78		Ryan Murphy (52.31); Michael Andrew (58.49); Caeleb Dressel (49.03); Zach Apple (46.95)	United States	1 August 2021	Olympic Games	Tokyo, Japan	

Legend: # – Record awaiting ratification by World Aquatics; ss – set in a now banned super suit; e – equalled existing record;
Records not set in finals: h – heat; sf – semifinal; r – relay 1st leg; rh – relay heat 1st leg; b – B final; † – en route to final mark; so – swim-off; tt – time trial

=== Women ===
Event	Time	Name	Nationality	Date	Meet	Location	Ref
50m freestyle	23.19	Kate Douglass	United States	15 August 2026	Pan Pacific Championships	Irvine, United States	
100m freestyle	51.68	Marrit Steenbergen	Netherlands	27 June 2026	Sette Colli Trophy	Rome, Italy	
200m freestyle	1:52.23	Ariarne Titmus	Australia	12 June 2024	Australian Olympic Trials	Brisbane, Australia	
400m freestyle	3:54.18	Summer McIntosh	Canada	7 June 2025	Canadian Trials	Victoria, Canada	
800m freestyle	8:04.12	Katie Ledecky	United States	3 May 2025	TYR Pro Swim Series	Fort Lauderdale, United States	
1500m freestyle	15:20.48	Katie Ledecky	United States	16 May 2018	TYR Pro Swim Series	Indianapolis, United States	
50m backstroke	26.56	Sara Curtis	Italy	13 August 2026	European Championships	Paris, France	
100m backstroke	57.13	Regan Smith	United States	18 June 2024	U.S. Olympic Trials	Indianapolis, United States	
200m backstroke	2:03.14	Kaylee McKeown	Australia	10 March 2023	NSW State Championships	Sydney, Australia	
50m breaststroke	29.16	Rūta Meilutytė	Lithuania	30 July 2023	World Championships	Fukuoka, Japan	
100m breaststroke	1:04.13	Lilly King	United States	25 July 2017	World Championships	Budapest, Hungary	
200m breaststroke	2:17.55	Evgeniia Chikunova	Russia	21 April 2023	Russian Championships	Kazan, Russia	
50m butterfly	24.43	Sarah Sjöström	Sweden	5 July 2014	Swedish Championships	Borås, Sweden	
100m butterfly	54.33	Gretchen Walsh	United States	2 May 2026	Fort Lauderdale Open	Fort Lauderdale, United States	
200m butterfly	2:01.65	Summer McIntosh	Canada	5 July 2026	Canadian Trials	Montreal, Canada	
200m individual medley	2:05.70	Summer McIntosh	Canada	9 June 2025	Canadian Trials	Victoria, Canada	
400m individual medley	4:23.65	Summer McIntosh	Canada	11 June 2025	Canadian Trials	Victoria, Canada	
4 × 100 m freestyle relay	3:27.96	Mollie O'Callaghan (52.08); Shayna Jack (51.69); Meg Harris (52.29); Emma McKeon (51.90)	Australia	23 July 2023	World Championships	Fukuoka, Japan	
4 × 200 m freestyle relay	7:37.50	Mollie O'Callaghan (1:53.66); Shayna Jack (1:55.63); Brianna Throssell (1:55.80); Ariarne Titmus (1:52.41)	Australia	27 July 2023	World Championships	Fukuoka, Japan	
4 × 100 m medley relay	3:49.34	Regan Smith (57.57); Kate Douglass (1:04.27); Gretchen Walsh (54.98); Torri Huske (52.52)	United States	3 August 2025	World Championships	Singapore, Singapore	

Legend: # – Record awaiting ratification by World Aquatics; e – equalled existing record;
Records not set in finals: h – heat; sf – semifinal; r – relay 1st leg; rh – relay heat 1st leg; b – B final; † – en route to final mark; so – swim-off; tt – time trial

=== Mixed relay ===
Event	Time	Name	Nationality	Date	Meet	Location	Ref
4 × 100 m freestyle relay	3:18.48	Jack Alexy (46.91); Patrick Sammon (46.70); Kate Douglass (52.43); Torri Huske (52.44)	United States	2 August 2025	World Championships	Singapore, Singapore	
4 × 100 m medley relay	3:36.70	Will Modglin (53.40); Van Mathias (57.30); Gretchen Walsh (54.99); Kate Douglass (51.01)	United States	12 August 2026	Pan Pacific Championships	Irvine, United States	

Legend: # – Record awaiting ratification by World Aquatics; e – equalled existing record;
Records not set in finals: h – heat; so – swim-off

== Short course (25m pool) ==
=== Men ===
Event	Time		Name	Nationality	Date	Meet	Location	Ref
50m freestyle	19.90	sf	Jordan Crooks	Cayman Islands	14 December 2024	World Championships	Budapest, Hungary	
100m freestyle	44.64	#	Jack Alexy	United States	30 October 2026	USA World Championship Trials	Westmont, United States	
100m freestyle	44.84	e	Kyle Chalmers	Australia	29 October 2021	World Cup	Kazan, Russia	
100m freestyle	44.84	e	Egor Kornev	Russia	2 October 2026	World Cup	Baku, Azerbaijan	
200m freestyle	1:38.61		Luke Hobson	United States	15 December 2024	World Championships	Budapest, Hungary	
400m freestyle	3:32.25		Yannick Agnel	France	15 November 2012	French Nationals	Angers, France	
800m freestyle	7:20.46		Daniel Wiffen	Ireland	10 December 2023	European Championships	Otopeni, Romania	
1500m freestyle	14:06.88		Florian Wellbrock	Germany	21 December 2021	World Championships	Abu Dhabi, United Arab Emirates	
50m backstroke	22.09		Pieter Coetze	South Africa	9 October 2026	World Cup	Tashkent, Uzbekistan	
50m backstroke	22.03	r, #	Xu Jiayu	China	24 October 2026	Chinese Championships	Beijing, China	
100m backstroke	48.16		Hubert Kós	Hungary	25 October 2025	World Cup	Toronto, Canada	
200m backstroke	1:45.12		Hubert Kós	Hungary	23 October 2025	World Cup	Toronto, Canada	
50m breaststroke	24.95		Emre Sakçı	Turkey	27 December 2021	Turkish Championships	Gaziantep, Turkey	
100m breaststroke	55.28		Ilya Shymanovich	Belarus	26 November 2021	International Swimming League	Eindhoven, Netherlands	
100m breaststroke	55.14	#	Van Mathias	United States	29 October 2026	USA World Championship Trials	Westmont, United States	
200m breaststroke	1:59.52		Caspar Corbeau	Netherlands	25 October 2025	World Cup	Toronto, Canada	
50m butterfly	21.28		Egor Kornev	Russia	10 October 2026	World Cup	Tashkent, Uzbekistan	
100m butterfly	47.68		Joshua Liendo	Canada	23 October 2025	World Cup	Toronto, Canada	
200m butterfly	1:46.85		Tomoru Honda	Japan	22 October 2022	Japanese Championships	Tokyo, Japan	
100m individual medley	49.28		Caeleb Dressel	United States	22 November 2020	International Swimming League	Budapest, Hungary	
200m individual medley	1:48.88		Léon Marchand	France	1 November 2024	World Cup	Singapore, Singapore	
400m individual medley	3:54.81		Daiya Seto	Japan	20 December 2019	International Swimming League	Las Vegas, United States	
400m individual medley	3:54.33	#	Tomoyuki Matsushita	Japan	11 October 2026	Japanese Championships	Saga, Japan	
4 × 50 m freestyle relay	1:21.80		Caeleb Dressel (20.43); Ryan Held (20.25); Jack Conger (20.59); Michael Chadwick (20.53)	United States	14 December 2018	World Championships	Hangzhou, China	
4 × 100 m freestyle relay	3:01.66		Jack Alexy (45.05); Luke Hobson (45.18); Kieran Smith (46.01); Chris Guiliano (45.42)	United States	10 December 2024	World Championships	Budapest, Hungary	
4 × 200 m freestyle relay	6:40.51		Luke Hobson (1:38.91); Carson Foster (1:40.77); Shaine Casas (1:40.34); Kieran Smith (1:40.49)	United States	13 December 2024	World Championships	Budapest, Hungary	
4 × 50 m medley relay	1:29.72		Lorenzo Mora (22.65); Nicolò Martinenghi (24.95); Matteo Rivolta (21.60); Leonardo Deplano (20.52)	Italy	17 December 2022	World Championships	Melbourne, Australia	
4 × 100 m medley relay	3:18.68		Miron Lifintsev (49.31); Kirill Prigoda (55.15); Andrei Minakov (48.80); Egor Kornev (45.42)	Russia	15 December 2024	World Championships	Budapest, Hungary	

Legend: # – Record awaiting ratification by World Aquatics; ss – set in a now banned super suit; e – equalled existing record;
Records not set in finals: h – heat; sf – semifinal; r – relay 1st leg; rh – relay heat 1st leg; b – B final; † – en route to final mark; so – swim-off; tt – time trial

=== Women ===
Event	Time		Name	Nationality	Date	Meet	Location	Ref
50m freestyle	22.75	# e	Gretchen Walsh	United States	16 October 2026	UVA Pro Elite SCM Worlds Prep Meet	Charlottesville, Virginia, United States	
50m freestyle	22.75	# e	Kate Douglass	United States	29 October 2026	USA World Championship Trials	Westmont, United States	
50m freestyle	22.83		Gretchen Walsh	United States	15 December 2024	World Championships	Budapest, Hungary	
100m freestyle	49.64	#	Kate Douglass	United States	31 October 2026	USA World Championship Trials	Westmont, United States	
100m freestyle	49.93		Kate Douglass	United States	25 October 2025	World Cup	Toronto, Canada	
200m freestyle	1:49.36		Mollie O'Callaghan	Australia	24 October 2025	World Cup	Toronto, Canada	
400m freestyle	3:50.25		Summer McIntosh	Canada	10 December 2024	World Championships	Budapest, Hungary	
800m freestyle	7:54.00		Lani Pallister	Australia	25 October 2025	World Cup	Toronto, Canada	
1500m freestyle	15:08.24		Katie Ledecky	United States	29 October 2022	World Cup	Toronto, Canada	
50m backstroke	25.21	#	Katharine Berkoff	United States	29 October 2026	USA World Championship Trials	Westmont, United States	
50m backstroke	25.23		Regan Smith	United States	13 December 2024	World Championships	Budapest, Hungary	
100m backstroke	53.92	#	Claire Curzan	United States	30 October 2026	USA World Championship Trials	Westmont, United States	
100m backstroke	54.02	e	Regan Smith	United States	15 December 2024	World Championships	Budapest, Hungary	
100m backstroke	54.02	e	Regan Smith	United States	18 October 2025	World Cup	Westmont, United States	
200m backstroke	1:57.33		Kaylee McKeown	Australia	25 October 2025	World Cup	Toronto, Canada	
50m breaststroke	28.37	sf	Rūta Meilutytė	Lithuania	17 December 2022	World Championships	Melbourne, Australia	
100m breaststroke	1:02.36	e	Rūta Meilutytė	Lithuania	12 October 2013	World Cup	Moscow, Russia	
100m breaststroke	1:02.36	e	Alia Atkinson	Jamaica	6 December 2014	World Championships	Doha, Qatar	
100m breaststroke	1:02.36	e	Alia Atkinson	Jamaica	26 August 2016	World Cup	Chartres, France	
200m breaststroke	2:12.50		Kate Douglass	United States	13 December 2024	World Championships	Budapest, Hungary	
50m butterfly	23.72		Gretchen Walsh	United States	11 October 2025	World Cup	Carmel, United States	
100m butterfly	52.71		Gretchen Walsh	United States	14 December 2024	World Championships	Budapest, Hungary	
200m butterfly	1:59.32		Summer McIntosh	Canada	12 December 2024	World Championships	Budapest, Hungary	
100m individual medley	55.11		Gretchen Walsh	United States	13 December 2024	World Championships	Budapest, Hungary	
200m individual medley	2:01.63		Kate Douglass	United States	10 December 2024	World Championships	Budapest, Hungary	
400m individual medley	4:15.48		Summer McIntosh	Canada	14 December 2024	World Championships	Budapest, Hungary	
4 × 50 m freestyle relay	1:32.50	tt	Ranomi Kromowidjojo (23.05); Maaike de Waard (23.16); Kim Busch (23.47); Femke Heemskerk (22.82)	Netherlands	12 December 2020	Wouda Cup	Eindhoven, Netherlands	
4 × 100 m freestyle relay	3:25.01		Kate Douglass (50.95); Katharine Berkoff (51.38); Alex Shackell (52.01); Gretchen Walsh (50.67)	United States	10 December 2024	World Championships	Budapest, Hungary	
4 × 200 m freestyle relay	7:30.13		Alex Walsh (1:53.25); Paige Madden (1:53.18); Katie Grimes (1:53.39); Claire Weinstein (1:50.31)	United States	12 December 2024	World Championships	Budapest, Hungary	
4 × 50 m medley relay	1:42.35		Mollie O'Callaghan (25.49); Chelsea Hodges (29.11); Emma McKeon (24.43); Madison Wilson (23.32)	Australia	17 December 2022	World Championships	Melbourne, Australia	
4 × 100 m medley relay	3:40.41		Regan Smith (54.02); Lilly King (1:03.02); Gretchen Walsh (52.84); Kate Douglass (50.53)	United States	15 December 2024	World Championships	Budapest, Hungary	

Legend: # – Record awaiting ratification by World Aquatics; e – equalled existing record;
Records not set in finals: h – heat; sf – semifinal; r – relay 1st leg; rh – relay heat 1st leg; b – B final; † – en route to final mark; so – swim-off; tt – time trial

=== Mixed relay ===
Event	Time	Name	Nationality	Date	Meet	Location	Ref
4 × 50 m freestyle relay	1:27.26	Leonardo Deplano (20.97); Lorenzo Zazzeri (20.51); Silvia Di Pietro (23.07); Sara Curtis (22.71)	Italy	4 December 2025	European Championships	Lublin, Poland	
4 × 50 m medley relay	1:35.15	Ryan Murphy (22.37); Nic Fink (24.96); Kate Douglass (24.09); Torri Huske (23.73)	United States	14 December 2022	World Championships	Melbourne, Australia	
4 × 100 m medley relay	3:30.47	Miron Lifintsev (48.90); Kirill Prigoda (54.86); Arina Surkova (55.63); Daria Klepikova (51.08)	Neutral Athletes B	14 December 2024	World Championships	Budapest, Hungary	

Legend: # – Record awaiting ratification by World Aquatics; e – equalled existing record;
Records not set in finals: h – heat; so – swim-off

== Record holders' rankings ==
=== By nation ===
Nation	Record tally	LC	SC	Total	LC	SC	Total	LC	SC	Total
Nation	Record tally	Men			Women			Mixed		
United States	35	5	7	12	7	13	20	2	1	3
Australia	9	1		1	4	4	8			
Canada	8		1	1	4	3	7			
France	4	2	2	4						
Germany	4	3	1	4						
Italy	4	1	1	2	1		1		1	1
Russia	4	1	2	3	1		1			
China	3	2	1	3						
Hungary	3	1	2	3						
Japan	3	1	2	3						
Lithuania	3				1	2	3			
Netherlands	3		1	1	1	1	2			
Great Britain	2	2		2						
Cayman Islands	1		1	1						
Ireland	1		1	1						
Jamaica	1					1	1			
Sweden	1				1		1			
Turkey	1		1	1						
Ukraine	1	1		1						
Total	91	20	23	43	20	24	44	2	2	4

=== By athlete (men) ===
Record count	Name (last record)	Nationality	Events
4	Caeleb Dressel (2021)	United States	100m butterfly LC; 4 × 100m medley relay LC; 100m individual medley SC; 4 × 50m freestyle relay SC
3	Jack Alexy (2026)	United States	Mixed 4 × 100m freestyle relay LC; 100m freestyle SC; 4 × 100m freestyle relay SC
3	Léon Marchand (2025)	France	200m individual medley LC; 400m individual medley LC; 200m individual medley SC
3	Luke Hobson (2024)	United States	200m freestyle SC; 4 × 100m freestyle relay SC; 4 × 200m freestyle relay SC
2	Egor Kornev (2026)	Russia	50m butterfly SC; 4 × 100m medley relay SC
2	Van Mathias (2026)	United States	Mixed 4 × 100m medley relay LC; 100m breaststroke SC
2	Hubert Kós (2025)	Hungary	100m backstroke SC; 200m backstroke SC
2	Leonardo Deplano (2025)	Italy	4 × 50m medley relay SC; Mixed 4 × 50m freestyle relay SC
2	Kieran Smith (2024)	United States	4 × 100m freestyle relay SC; 4 × 200m freestyle relay SC
2	Ryan Murphy (2022)	United States	4 × 100m medley relay LC; Mixed 4 × 50m medley relay SC
2	Adam Peaty (2019)	Great Britain	50m breaststroke LC; 100m breaststroke LC
2	Michael Phelps (2009)	United States	4 × 100m freestyle relay LC; 4 × 200m freestyle relay LC

=== By athlete (women) ===
Record count	Name (last record)	Nationality	Events
11	Kate Douglass (2026)	United States	50m freestyle LC; 4 × 100m medley relay LC; Mixed 4 × 100m freestyle relay LC; Mixed 4 × 100m medley relay LC; 50m freestyle SC; 100m freestyle SC; 200m breaststroke SC; 200m individual medley SC; 4 × 100m freestyle relay SC; 4 × 100m medley relay SC; Mixed 4 × 50m medley relay SC
9	Gretchen Walsh (2026)	United States	100m butterfly LC; 4 × 100m medley relay LC; Mixed 4 × 100m medley relay LC; 50m freestyle SC; 50m butterfly SC; 100m butterfly SC; 100m individual medley SC; 4 × 100m freestyle relay SC; 4 × 100m medley relay SC
7	Summer McIntosh (2026)	Canada	400m freestyle LC; 200m butterfly LC; 200m individual medley LC; 400m individual medley LC; 400m freestyle SC; 200m butterfly SC; 400m individual medley SC
4	Mollie O'Callaghan (2025)	Australia	4 × 100m freestyle relay LC; 4 × 200m freestyle relay LC; 200m freestyle SC; 4 × 50m medley relay SC
4	Torri Huske (2025)	United States	4 × 100m medley relay LC; Mixed 4 × 100m freestyle relay LC; Mixed 4 × 100m medley relay LC; Mixed 4 × 50m medley relay SC
3	Regan Smith (2025)	United States	100m backstroke LC; 4 × 100m medley relay LC; 4 × 100m medley relay SC
3	Katie Ledecky (2025)	United States	800m freestyle LC; 1500m freestyle LC; 1500m freestyle SC
3	Rūta Meilutytė (2023)	Lithuania	50m breaststroke LC; 50m breaststroke SC; 100m breaststroke SC
2	Katharine Berkoff (2026)	United States	50m backstroke SC; 4 × 100m freestyle relay SC
2	Sara Curtis (2026)	Italy	50m backstroke LC; Mixed 4 × 50m freestyle relay SC
2	Kaylee McKeown (2025)	Australia	200m backstroke LC; 200m backstroke SC
2	Ariarne Titmus (2024)	Australia	200m freestyle LC; 4 × 200m freestyle relay LC
2	Lilly King (2024)	United States	100m breaststroke LC; 4 × 100m medley relay SC
2	Shayna Jack (2023)	Australia	4 × 100m freestyle relay LC; 4 × 200m freestyle relay LC
2	Emma McKeon (2023)	Australia	4 × 100m freestyle relay LC; 4 × 50m medley relay SC

== World bests and other relay performances ==
World Aquatics recognises mixed 4 × 100 m freestyle and medley relay world records in 50 m pools, and mixed 4 × 50 m freestyle and medley relay world records in 25 m pools. For a relay world record to be recognised, all team members must have the same sporting nationality.

The tables below list documented world bests and championship or league records that are not ratified World Aquatics world records.

=== Long course (50m pool) ===
==== Mixed ====
Event	Time		Name	Team	Date	Meet	Location	Ref
4 × 200 m freestyle relay	7:24.13	CR	Jack McMillan (1:47.09); Matthew Richards (1:45.85); Freya Colbert (1:55.23); Freya Anderson (1:55.96)	Great Britain	15 August 2026	European Championships	Paris, France	

Legend: e – equalled existing record; CR – championship record;
Records not set in finals: h – heat

=== Short course (25m pool) ===
==== Men ====
France's 1:20.77 predates FINA's recognition of world records in the 4 × 50 m freestyle relay; the official world record is 1:21.80. Energy Standard's 3:18.28 was swum by a team of different sporting nationalities.

Event	Time		Name	Team	Date	Meet	Location	Ref
4 × 50 m freestyle relay	1:20.77	WB; ER; CR ss	Alain Bernard (20.64); Fabien Gilot (20.33); Amaury Leveaux (19.93); Frédérick Bousquet (19.87)	France	14 December 2008	European Championships	Rijeka, Croatia	
4 × 100 m medley relay	3:18.28	WB; LR	Kliment Kolesnikov (48.58); Ilya Shymanovich (55.38); Chad le Clos (48.53); Florent Manaudou (45.79)	Energy Standard	21 November 2020	International Swimming League	Budapest, Hungary	

Legend: ER – European record; ss – set in a now banned super suit; e – equalled existing record; WB – world best; CR – championship record; LR – International Swimming League record;
Records not set in finals: h – heat

==== Mixed ====
Event	Time		Name	Team	Date	Meet	Location	Ref
4 × 100 m freestyle relay	3:14.21	LR	Evgeny Rylov (46.58); Florent Manaudou (45.44); Sarah Sjöström (51.01); Siobhán Haughey (51.18)	Energy Standard	22 November 2020	International Swimming League	Budapest, Hungary	

Legend: e – equalled existing record; WB – world best; LR – International Swimming League record;
Records not set in finals: h – heat
