= Australia at the 2019 World Aquatics Championships =

- Flag of Australia
- World Aquatics code: AUS
- National federation: Swimming Australia
- Website: swimming.org.au

in Gwangju, South Korea
- Competitors: 90 in 6 sports
- Medals Ranked 4th: Gold 7 Silver 9 Bronze 7 Total 23

World Aquatics Championships appearances
- 1973; 1975; 1978; 1982; 1986; 1991; 1994; 1998; 2001; 2003; 2005; 2007; 2009; 2011; 2013; 2015; 2017; 2019; 2022; 2023; 2024; 2025

Australia competed at the 2019 World Aquatics Championships in Gwangju, South Korea from 12 to 28 July.

== Medalists ==
Medal	Name	Sport	Event	Date
Gold	Matthew Carter; Maddison Keeney	Diving	Mixed synchronized 3 m springboard	20 July
Gold	Ariarne Titmus	Swimming	Women's 400 metre freestyle	21 July
Gold	Bronte Campbell; Brianna Throssell; Emma McKeon; Cate Campbell; Madison Wilson*	Swimming	Women's 4 x 100 metre freestyle relay	21 July
Gold	Rhiannan Iffland	High diving	Women's high diving	23 July
Gold	Mitch Larkin; Matthew Wilson; Emma McKeon; Cate Campbell; Minna Atherton*; Matthew Temple*; Bronte Campbell*	Swimming	4 x 100 metre mixed medley relay	24 July
Gold	Ariarne Titmus; Madison Wilson; Brianna Throssell; Emma McKeon; Leah Neale*; Kiah Melverton*	Swimming	Women's 4 x 200 metre freestyle relay	25 July
Gold	Clyde Lewis; Kyle Chalmers; Alexander Graham; Mack Horton; Jack McLoughlin*; Thomas Fraser-Holmes*	Swimming	Men's 4×200 m freestyle relay	26 July
Silver	Mack Horton	Swimming	Men's 400 metre freestyle	21 July
Silver	Minna Atherton	Swimming	Women's 100 metre backstroke	23 July
Silver	Ariarne Titmus	Swimming	Women's 200 metre freestyle	24 July
Silver	Kyle Chalmers	Swimming	Men's 100 metre freestyle	25 July
Silver	Cate Campbell	Swimming	Women's 100 metre freestyle	26 July
Silver	Matthew Wilson	Swimming	Men's 200 metre breaststroke	26 July
Silver	Kaylee McKeown	Swimming	Women's 200 metre backstroke	27 July
Silver	Kyle Chalmers; Clyde Lewis; Emma McKeon; Bronte Campbell; Cameron McEvoy*; Alexander Graham*; Brianna Throssell*; Madison Wilson*	Swimming	4 × 100 metre mixed freestyle relay	27 July
Silver	Minna Atherton; Jessica Hansen; Emma McKeon; Cate Campbell; Kaylee McKeown*; Brianna Throssell*; Madison Wilson*	Swimming	Women's 4 × 100 metre medley relay	28 July
Bronze	Maddison Keeney	Diving	Women's 3 m springboard	19 July
Bronze	Cameron McEvoy; Clyde Lewis; Alexander Graham; Kyle Chalmers	Swimming	Men's 4 x 100 metre freestyle relay	21 July
Bronze	Emma McKeon	Swimming	Women's 100 metre butterfly	22 July
Bronze	Mitch Larkin	Swimming	Men's 100 metre backstroke	23 July
Bronze	Australia women's national water polo team: Gabriella Palm; Keesja Gofers; Hannah Buckling; Bronte Halligan; Iso Bishop; Bronwen Knox; Rowie Webster; Amy Ridge; Zoe Arancini; Lena Mihailovic; Elle Armit; Madeleine Steere; Lea Yanitsas	Water polo	Women's tournament	26 July
Bronze	Ariarne Titmus	Swimming	Women's 800 metre freestyle	27 July
Bronze	Cate Campbell	Swimming	Women's 50 metre freestyle	28 July

== Artistic swimming ==
Australia's artistic swimming team consisted of 14 athletes (13 female and 1 male).

Women

Athlete	Event	Preliminaries		Final	
Athlete	Event	Points	Rank	Points	Rank
Rose Stackpole; Amie Thompson	Duet technical routine	74.1141	35	Did not advance	
Rose Stackpole; Amie Thompson	Duet free routine	74.2667	35	Did not advance	
Jane Fruzynski; Alessandra Ho; Kirsten Kinash; Rachel Presser; Emily Rogers; Rose Stackpole; Amie Thompson; Kazia Zenke; Kiera Gazzard (R); Erica Li (R)	Team technical routine	73.4450	20	Did not advance	
Hannah Burkhill; Hannah Cross; Jane Fruzynski; Kirsten Kinash; Rachel Presser; Emily Rogers; Rose Stackpole; Amie Thompson; Kiera Gazzard (R); Alessandra Ho (R)	Team free routine	74.5333	22	Did not advance	

Mixed

Athlete	Event	Preliminaries		Final	
Athlete	Event	Points	Rank	Points	Rank
Ethan Calleja; Danielle Kettlewell	Duet free routine	68.9667	11 Q	68.7000	11

Legend: (R) = Reserve Athlete

== Diving ==
Australia entered 13 divers.

Men

Athlete	Event	Preliminaries		Semifinals		Final	
Athlete	Event	Points	Rank	Points	Rank	Points	Rank
Kevin Chávez	1 m springboard	322.25	24	—N/a		Did not advance	
Li Shixin	1 m springboard	338.60	15	—N/a		Did not advance	
Li Shixin	3 m springboard	377.75	24	Did not advance			
Matthew Carter	3 m springboard	416.35	13 Q	420.00	13	Did not advance	
Cassiel Rousseau	10 m platform	393.95	17 Q	416.80	12 Q	455.35	9
Matthew Carter; Li Shixin	3 m synchronized springboard	338.40	14	—N/a		Did not advance	
Domonic Bedggood; Declan Stacey	10 m synchronized platform	370.29	9 Q	—N/a		411.24	5

Women

Athlete	Event	Preliminaries		Semifinals		Final	
Athlete	Event	Points	Rank	Points	Rank	Points	Rank
Georgia Sheehan	1 m springboard	238.25	9 Q	—N/a		244.20	8
Esther Qin	1 m springboard	225.55	15	—N/a		Did not advance	
Esther Qin	3 m springboard	272.10	15 Q	286.40	12 Q	302.85	6
Maddison Keeney	3 m springboard	341.00	3 Q	348.10	2 Q	367.05	3rd place, bronze medalist(s)
Laura Hingston	10 m platform	281.00	18 Q	283.70	18	Did not advance	
Melissa Wu	10 m platform	343.70	3 Q	322.50	6 Q	360.20	4
Maddison Keeney; Anabelle Smith	3 m synchronized springboard	287.43	3 Q	—N/a		278.13	6
Emily Chinnock; Melissa Wu	10 m synchronized platform	274.20	9 Q	—N/a		277.44	8

Mixed

Athlete	Event	Final	
Athlete	Event	Points	Rank
Matthew Carter; Maddison Keeney	3 m synchronized springboard	304.86	1st place, gold medalist(s)
Cassiel Rousseau; Laura Hingston	Team	329.30	5

== High diving ==
Australia qualified two female high divers.

Athlete	Event	Points	Rank
Rhiannan Iffland	Women's high diving	298.05	1st place, gold medalist(s)
Xantheia Pennisi	Women's high diving	248.60	6

== Open water swimming ==
Australia qualified four male and four female open water swimmers.

Men

Athlete	Event	Time	Rank
Bailey Armstrong	Men's 5 km	53:34.8	7
Bailey Armstrong	Men's 25 km	5:04:10.7	18
Hayden Cotter	Men's 5 km	53:35.5	9
Kai Edwards	Men's 10 km	1:48:16.2	14
Kai Edwards	Men's 25 km	4:51:17.2	5
Nicholas Sloman	Men's 10 km	1:49:22.7	21

Women

Athlete	Event	Time	Rank
Mackenzie Brazier	Women's 5 km	59:56.1	33
Chelsea Gubecka	Women's 10 km	1:55:45.2	29
Chelsea Gubecka	Women's 25 km	DNF	
Chloe Gubecka	Women's 5 km	59:50.6	30
Kareena Lee	Women's 10 km	1:54:50.5	7

Mixed

Athlete	Event	Time	Rank
Hayden Cotter; Chelsea Gubecka; Kareena Lee; Nicholas Sloman	Team	54:36.8	5

== Swimming ==
Australia entered 27 swimmers.

Men

Athlete	Event	Heat		Semifinal		Final	
Athlete	Event	Time	Rank	Time	Rank	Time	Rank
Kyle Chalmers	100 m freestyle	48.66	10 Q	47.58	1 Q	47.08	2nd place, silver medalist(s)
Kyle Chalmers	200 m freestyle	1:46.36	4 Q	1:46.21	6	Did not advance	
Thomas Fraser-Holmes	200 m individual medley	1:58.86	9 Q	1:58.86	7	Did not advance	
Thomas Fraser-Holmes	400 m individual medley	4:16.93	12	—N/a		Did not advance	
Mack Horton	400 m freestyle	3:45.51	5 Q	—N/a		3:43.17	2nd place, silver medalist(s)
Mack Horton	800 m freestyle	7:52.65	14	—N/a		Did not advance	
Mitch Larkin	50 m backstroke	25.33	20	Did not advance			
Mitch Larkin	100 m backstroke	53.12	3 Q	52.91	3 Q	52.77	3rd place, bronze medalist(s)
Mitch Larkin	200 m backstroke	DNS					
Mitch Larkin	200 m individual medley	1:58.75	8 Q	1:57.45	4 Q	1:57.32	7
Clyde Lewis	100 m freestyle	48.63	9 Q	48.45	5	Did not advance	
Clyde Lewis	200 m freestyle	1:46.93	14 Q	1:44.90	1 Q	1:45.78	6
Jack McLoughlin	400 m freestyle	3:44.79	3 Q	—N/a		3:45.19	6
Jack McLoughlin	800 m freestyle	7:46.42	3 Q	—N/a		7:42.64	4
Jack McLoughlin	1500 m freestyle	15:04.64	16	—N/a		Did not advance	
David Morgan	100 m butterfly	52.44	14 Q	52.20	8	Did not advance	
David Morgan	200 m butterfly	1:56.90	12 Q	1:59.57	8	Did not advance	
Zac Stubblety-Cook	200 m breaststroke	2:09.05	5 Q	2:07.95	2 Q	2:07.36	4
Matthew Temple	100 m butterfly	51.89	8 Q	51.70	4 Q	51.51	6
Matthew Temple	200 m butterfly	1:56.54	9 Q	1:56.52	5	Did not advance	
Matthew Wilson	100 m breaststroke	59.17	6 Q	59.26	10	Did not advance	
Matthew Wilson	200 m breaststroke	2:07.29	1 Q	2:06.67 =WR	1 Q	2:06.68	2nd place, silver medalist(s)
Bradley Woodward	100 m backstroke	54.41	24	Did not advance			
Bradley Woodward	200 m backstroke	1:58.31	18	Did not advance			
Cameron McEvoy; Clyde Lewis; Alexander Graham; Kyle Chalmers	4×100 m freestyle relay	3:12.65	4 Q	—N/a		3:11.22	3rd place, bronze medalist(s)
Clyde Lewis; Kyle Chalmers; Alexander Graham; Mack Horton; Jack McLoughlin*; Thomas Fraser-Holmes*	4×200 m freestyle relay	7:06.97	4 Q	—N/a		7:00.85	1st place, gold medalist(s)
Mitch Larkin; Matthew Wilson; Matthew Temple; Kyle Chalmers; Clyde Lewis*	4×100 m medley relay	3:32.50	5 Q	—N/a		3:30.42	5

Women

Athlete	Event	Heat		Semifinal		Final	
Athlete	Event	Time	Rank	Time	Rank	Time	Rank
Minna Atherton	50 m backstroke	28.32	19	Did not advance			
Minna Atherton	100 m backstroke	59.22	2 Q	58.60	1 Q	58.85	2nd place, silver medalist(s)
Minna Atherton	200 m backstroke	2:09.32	6 Q	2:07.38	1 Q	2:08.26	6
Bronte Campbell	50 m freestyle	24.74	9 Q	24.38	6 Q	24.48	8
Cate Campbell	50 m freestyle	24.40	2 Q	24.09	1 Q	24.11	3rd place, bronze medalist(s)
Cate Campbell	100 m freestyle	53.36	4 Q	52.71	2 Q	52.43	2nd place, silver medalist(s)
Maddy Gough	1500 m freestyle	16:02.75	8 Q	—N/a		15:59.40	5
Jessica Hansen	50 m breaststroke	30.69	6 Q	30.92	4 Q	30.84	6
Jessica Hansen	100 m breaststroke	1:07.38	12 Q	1:06.98	4	Did not advance	
Jessica Hansen	200 m breaststroke	2:29.18	21	Did not advance			
Emma McKeon	100 m freestyle	53.58	7 Q	52.77	1 Q	52.75	4
Emma McKeon	200 m freestyle	DNS					
Emma McKeon	100 m butterfly	56.90	2 Q	57.01	4 Q	56.61	3rd place, bronze medalist(s)
Kaylee McKeown	50 m backstroke	28.23	14 Q	27.73	3 Q	27.65	=4
Kaylee McKeown	100 m backstroke	59.25	3 Q	59.13	2 Q	59.10	5
Kaylee McKeown	200 m backstroke	2:09.17	4 Q	2:08.19	3 Q	2:06.26	2nd place, silver medalist(s)
Kiah Melverton	400 m freestyle	4:09.56	11	—N/a		Did not advance	
Kiah Melverton	800 m freestyle	8:29.70	8 Q	—N/a		8:25.07	7
Kiah Melverton	1500 m freestyle	15:59.92	6 Q	—N/a		16:01.38	7
Jenna Strauch	200 m breaststroke	2:26.25	15 Q	2:26.65	8	Did not advance	
Brianna Throssell	50 m butterfly	26.14	11 Q	25.93	4 Q	26.11	8
Brianna Throssell	100 m butterfly	57.88	9 Q	57.02	5 Q	57.09	5
Brianna Throssell	200 m butterfly	2:09.91	11 Q	Withdrew			
Ariarne Titmus	200 m freestyle	1:56.34	3 Q	1:55.36	2 Q	1:54.66	2nd place, silver medalist(s)
Ariarne Titmus	400 m freestyle	4:02.42	2 Q	—N/a		3:58.76	1st place, gold medalist(s)
Ariarne Titmus	800 m freestyle	8:19.43	3 Q	—N/a		8:15.70	3rd place, bronze medalist(s)
Cate Campbell; Brianna Throssell; Emma McKeon; Bronte Campbell; Madison Wilson*	4×100 m freestyle relay	3:33.39	1 Q	—N/a		3:30.21	1st place, gold medalist(s)
Ariarne Titmus; Madison Wilson; Brianna Throssell; Emma McKeon; Leah Neale*; Kiah Melverton*	4×200 m freestyle relay	7:50.64	1 Q	—N/a		7:41.50 WR	1st place, gold medalist(s)
Minna Atherton; Jessica Hansen; Emma McKeon; Cate Campbell; Kaylee McKeown*; Brianna Throssell*; Madison Wilson*	4×100 m medley relay	3:58.19	2 Q	—N/a		3:53.42	2nd place, silver medalist(s)

Mixed

Athlete	Event	Heat		Final	
Athlete	Event	Time	Rank	Time	Rank
Kyle Chalmers; Clyde Lewis; Emma McKeon; Bronte Campbell; Cameron McEvoy*; Alexander Graham*; Brianna Throssell*; Madison Wilson*	4×100 m freestyle relay	3:23.77	2 Q	3:19.97	2nd place, silver medalist(s)
Mitch Larkin; Matthew Wilson; Emma McKeon; Cate Campbell; Minna Atherton*; Matthew Temple*; Bronte Campbell*	4×100 m medley relay	3:42.22	2 Q	3:39.08	1st place, gold medalist(s)

Legend: (*) = Swimmers who participated in the heat only.

== Water polo ==
=== Men's tournament ===
Team roster

- Joel Dennerley
- Richard Campbell
- George Ford
- Joe Kayes
- Nathan Power
- Lachlan Edwards
- Aidan Roach
- Aaron Younger (C)
- Andrew Ford
- Timothy Putt
- Rhys Howden
- Blake Edwards
- Anthony Hrysanthos
- Coach: Elvis Fatović

Group B

Pos	Team	Pld	W	D	L	GF	GA	GD	Pts	Qualification
1	Croatia	3	3	0	0	52	16	+36	6	Quarterfinals
2	United States	3	2	0	1	35	35	0	4	Playoffs
3	Australia	3	1	0	2	32	34	−2	2	Playoffs
4	Kazakhstan	3	0	0	3	20	54	−34	0	

Source: Sportresult
Rules for classification: 1) points; 2) head-to-head points; 3) head-to-head goal difference; 4) head-to-head number of goals scored; 5) Goal difference.

15 July 2019; 12:30	Report	Croatia	14–4	Australia	Nambu University Aquatics Center, Gwangju; Referees: Germán Moller (ARG), Alessandro Severo (ITA)
15 July 2019; 12:30	Report	Score by quarters: 4–1, 2–1, 4–0, 4–2			Nambu University Aquatics Center, Gwangju; Referees: Germán Moller (ARG), Alessandro Severo (ITA)
15 July 2019; 12:30	Report	Vukičević 6	Goals	Younger 2	Nambu University Aquatics Center, Gwangju; Referees: Germán Moller (ARG), Alessandro Severo (ITA)

17 July 2019; 08:30	Report	Australia	17–8	Kazakhstan	Nambu University Aquatics Center, Gwangju; Referees: Germán Moller (ARG), Dion Willis (RSA)
17 July 2019; 08:30	Report	Score by quarters: 4–1, 5–1, 3–4, 5–2			Nambu University Aquatics Center, Gwangju; Referees: Germán Moller (ARG), Dion Willis (RSA)
17 July 2019; 08:30	Report	Howden 4	Goals	Zhardan 3	Nambu University Aquatics Center, Gwangju; Referees: Germán Moller (ARG), Dion Willis (RSA)

19 July 2019; 19:10	Report	United States	12–11	Australia	Nambu University Aquatics Center, Gwangju; Referees: Adrian Alxandrescu (ROU), Arkadiy Voevodin (RUS)
19 July 2019; 19:10	Report	Score by quarters: 4–3, 3–3, 2–2, 3–3			Nambu University Aquatics Center, Gwangju; Referees: Adrian Alxandrescu (ROU), Arkadiy Voevodin (RUS)
19 July 2019; 19:10	Report	Cupido 3	Goals	four players 2	Nambu University Aquatics Center, Gwangju; Referees: Adrian Alxandrescu (ROU), Arkadiy Voevodin (RUS)

Playoffs

21 July 2019; 14:00	Report	Montenegro	11–13 (PSO)	Australia	Nambu University Aquatics Center, Gwangju; Referees: Michael Goldenberg (USA), Viktor Salnichenko (KAZ)
21 July 2019; 14:00	Report	Score by quarters: 1–3, 3–2, 4–2, 1–2 PSO: 2–4			Nambu University Aquatics Center, Gwangju; Referees: Michael Goldenberg (USA), Viktor Salnichenko (KAZ)
21 July 2019; 14:00	Report	Ivović 3	Goals	Kayes 4	Nambu University Aquatics Center, Gwangju; Referees: Michael Goldenberg (USA), Viktor Salnichenko (KAZ)

Quarterfinal

23 July 2019; 17:00	Report	Hungary	10–9	Australia	Nambu University Aquatics Center, Gwangju; Referees: Arkadiy Voevodin (RUS), Vojin Putniković (SRB)
23 July 2019; 17:00	Report	Score by quarters: 3–3, 2–3, 3–1, 2–2			Nambu University Aquatics Center, Gwangju; Referees: Arkadiy Voevodin (RUS), Vojin Putniković (SRB)
23 July 2019; 17:00	Report	Vámos, Zalánki 3	Goals	four players 2	Nambu University Aquatics Center, Gwangju; Referees: Arkadiy Voevodin (RUS), Vojin Putniković (SRB)

5th–8th place semifinals

25 July 2019; 15:30	Report	Australia	9–8	Greece	Nambu University Aquatics Center, Gwangju; Referees: Michael Goldenberg (USA), Nenad Peris (CRO)
25 July 2019; 15:30	Report	Score by quarters: 3–2, 2–3, 3–3, 1–0			Nambu University Aquatics Center, Gwangju; Referees: Michael Goldenberg (USA), Nenad Peris (CRO)
25 July 2019; 15:30	Report	Kayes 3	Goals	Kapotsis, Kolomvos 2	Nambu University Aquatics Center, Gwangju; Referees: Michael Goldenberg (USA), Nenad Peris (CRO)

Fifth place game

27 July 2019; 15:30	Report	Serbia	13–9	Australia	Nambu University Aquatics Center, Gwangju; Referees: Dion Willis (RSA), Sebastien Dervieux (FRA)
27 July 2019; 15:30	Report	Score by quarters: 6–1, 3–2, 1–2, 3–4			Nambu University Aquatics Center, Gwangju; Referees: Dion Willis (RSA), Sebastien Dervieux (FRA)
27 July 2019; 15:30	Report	Ćuk, Rašović 4	Goals	Ford, Younger 2	Nambu University Aquatics Center, Gwangju; Referees: Dion Willis (RSA), Sebastien Dervieux (FRA)

=== Women's tournament ===
Team roster

- Gabriella Palm
- Keesja Gofers
- Hannah Buckling
- Bronte Halligan
- Iso Bishop
- Bronwen Knox
- Rowie Webster (C)
- Amy Ridge
- Zoe Arancini
- Lena Mihailovic
- Elle Armit
- Madeleine Steere
- Lea Yanitsas
- Coach: Predrag Mihailović

Group D

Pos	Team	Pld	W	D	L	GF	GA	GD	Pts	Qualification
1	Italy	3	3	0	0	33	22	+11	6	Quarterfinals
2	Australia	3	2	0	1	32	29	+3	4	Playoffs
3	China	3	1	0	2	26	34	−8	2	Playoffs
4	Japan	3	0	0	3	20	26	−6	0	

Source: Sportresult
Rules for classification: 1) points; 2) head-to-head points; 3) head-to-head goal difference; 4) head-to-head number of goals scored; 5) Goal difference.

14 July 2019; 20:30	Report	Italy	10–9	Australia	Nambu University Aquatics Center, Gwangju; Referees: Sebastien Dervieux (FRA), Germán Moller (ARG)
14 July 2019; 20:30	Report	Score by quarters: 3–0, 3–2, 3–3, 1–4			Nambu University Aquatics Center, Gwangju; Referees: Sebastien Dervieux (FRA), Germán Moller (ARG)
14 July 2019; 20:30	Report	Garibotti 3	Goals	Webster 4	Nambu University Aquatics Center, Gwangju; Referees: Sebastien Dervieux (FRA), Germán Moller (ARG)

16 July 2019; 16:30	Report	Australia	14–12	China	Nambu University Aquatics Center, Gwangju; Referees: Viktor Salnichenko (KAZ), Michael Goldenberg (USA)
16 July 2019; 16:30	Report	Score by quarters: 4–4, 5–3, 3–3, 2–2			Nambu University Aquatics Center, Gwangju; Referees: Viktor Salnichenko (KAZ), Michael Goldenberg (USA)
16 July 2019; 16:30	Report	Gofers, Webster 3	Goals	Zhao 4	Nambu University Aquatics Center, Gwangju; Referees: Viktor Salnichenko (KAZ), Michael Goldenberg (USA)

18 July 2019; 11:10	Report	Japan	7–9	Australia	Nambu University Aquatics Center, Gwangju; Referees: Gabriella Várkonyi (HUN), Stanko Ivanovski (MNE)
18 July 2019; 11:10	Report	Score by quarters: 2–3, 2–1, 1–2, 2–3			Nambu University Aquatics Center, Gwangju; Referees: Gabriella Várkonyi (HUN), Stanko Ivanovski (MNE)
18 July 2019; 11:10	Report	three players 2	Goals	Buckling 3	Nambu University Aquatics Center, Gwangju; Referees: Gabriella Várkonyi (HUN), Stanko Ivanovski (MNE)

Playoffs

20 July 2019; 18:30	Report	Kazakhstan	3–13	Australia	Nambu University Aquatics Center, Gwangju; Referees: Vojin Putniković (SRB), Marie-Claude Deslieres (CAN)
20 July 2019; 18:30	Report	Score by quarters: 0–4, 1–2, 2–3, 0–4			Nambu University Aquatics Center, Gwangju; Referees: Vojin Putniković (SRB), Marie-Claude Deslieres (CAN)
20 July 2019; 18:30	Report	Myrzabekova 2	Goals	Halligan 4	Nambu University Aquatics Center, Gwangju; Referees: Vojin Putniković (SRB), Marie-Claude Deslieres (CAN)

Quarterfinals

22 July 2019; 15:30	Report	Russia	7–9	Australia	Nambu University Aquatics Center, Gwangju; Referees: Alessandro Severo (ITA), Adrian Alexandrescu (ROU)
22 July 2019; 15:30	Report	Score by quarters: 1–2, 0–2, 3–2, 3–3			Nambu University Aquatics Center, Gwangju; Referees: Alessandro Severo (ITA), Adrian Alexandrescu (ROU)
22 July 2019; 15:30	Report	Karimova 2	Goals	Webster 3	Nambu University Aquatics Center, Gwangju; Referees: Alessandro Severo (ITA), Adrian Alexandrescu (ROU)

Semifinals

24 July 2019; 17:00	Report	United States	7–2	Australia	Nambu University Aquatics Center, Gwangju; Referees: Nenad Peris (CRO), Adrian Alexandrescu (ROU)
24 July 2019; 17:00	Report	Score by quarters: 3–0, 2–0, 1–1, 1–1			Nambu University Aquatics Center, Gwangju; Referees: Nenad Peris (CRO), Adrian Alexandrescu (ROU)
24 July 2019; 17:00	Report	three players 2	Goals	Halligan, Webster 1	Nambu University Aquatics Center, Gwangju; Referees: Nenad Peris (CRO), Adrian Alexandrescu (ROU)

Third place game

26 July 2019; 17:00	Report	Australia	10–9	Hungary	Nambu University Aquatics Center, Gwangju; Referees: Marie-Claude Deslieres (CAN), Jaume Teixidó (ESP)
26 July 2019; 17:00	Report	Score by quarters: 3–3, 4–3, 1–1, 2–2			Nambu University Aquatics Center, Gwangju; Referees: Marie-Claude Deslieres (CAN), Jaume Teixidó (ESP)
26 July 2019; 17:00	Report	Arancini 3	Goals	Keszthelyi 3	Nambu University Aquatics Center, Gwangju; Referees: Marie-Claude Deslieres (CAN), Jaume Teixidó (ESP)
