= Australia at the 2017 World Aquatics Championships =

- Flag of Australia
- World Aquatics code: AUS
- National federation: Swimming Australia
- Website: swimming.org.au

in Budapest, Hungary
- Competitors: 83 in 6 sports
- Medals Ranked 7th: Gold 3 Silver 5 Bronze 4 Total 12

World Aquatics Championships appearances
- 1973; 1975; 1978; 1982; 1986; 1991; 1994; 1998; 2001; 2003; 2005; 2007; 2009; 2011; 2013; 2015; 2017; 2019; 2022; 2023; 2024; 2025

Australia competed at the 2017 World Aquatics Championships in Budapest, Hungary from 14 to 30 July.

== Medalists ==
| Medal | Name | Sport | Event | Date |
|---|---|---|---|---|
| Gold | Maddison Keeney | Diving | Women's 1 m springboard | 15 July |
| Gold | Rhiannan Iffland | High diving | Women's high diving | 29 July |
| Gold | Emily Seebohm | Swimming | Women's 200 m backstroke | 29 July |
| Silver | Mack Horton | Swimming | Men's 400 m freestyle | 23 July |
| Silver | Bronte Campbell; Brittany Elmslie; Shayna Jack; Emma McKeon; Emily Seebohm*; Madison Wilson* | Swimming | Women's 4 × 100 m freestyle relay | 23 July |
| Silver | Emma McKeon | Swimming | Women's 100 m butterfly | 24 July |
| Silver | Emma McKeon | Swimming | Women's 200 m freestyle | 26 July |
| Silver | Bronte Campbell; Daniel Cave; Grant Irvine*; Mitch Larkin; Shayna Jack*; Emma McKeon; Kaylee McKeown*; Matthew Wilson* | Swimming | Mixed 4 × 100 m medley relay | 26 July |
| Bronze | Emily Seebohm | Swimming | Women's 100 m backstroke | 25 July |
| Bronze | Shayna Jack*; Emma McKeon; Leah Neale*; Kotuku Ngawati; Ariarne Titmus; Madison Wilson | Swimming | Women's 4 × 200 m freestyle relay | 27 July |
| Bronze | Mack Horton | Swimming | Men's 1500 m freestyle | 30 July |
| Bronze | Holly Barratt*; Bronte Campbell; Jessica Hansen*; Shayna Jack*; Emma McKeon; Taylor McKeown; Emily Seebohm; Brianna Throssell* | Swimming | Women's 4 × 100 m medley relay | 30 July |

== Diving ==
Australia has entered 10 divers (five male and five female).

Men

| Athlete | Event | Preliminaries | | Semifinals | | Final | |
| Athlete | Event | Points | Rank | Points | Rank | Points | Rank |
|---|---|---|---|---|---|---|---|
| Kevin Chávez | 1 m springboard | 330.10 | 24 | —N/a | | Did not advance | |
| James Connor | 1 m springboard | 323.40 | 26 | —N/a | | Did not advance | |
| Kevin Chávez | 3 m springboard | 382.85 | 31 | Did not advance | | | |
| James Connor | 3 m springboard | 431.90 | 9 Q | 462.30 | 8 Q | 453.80 | 9 |
| Domonic Bedggood | 10 m platform | 450.30 | 6 Q | 404.45 | 13 | Did not advance | |
| Declan Stacey | 10 m platform | 409.45 | 15 Q | 305.00 | 18 | Did not advance | |
| Matthew Carter; Kevin Chávez | 3 m synchronized springboard | 377.91 | 11 Q | —N/a | | 357.33 | 12 |
| Domonic Bedggood; Declan Stacey | 10 m synchronized platform | 388.20 | 9 Q | —N/a | | 387.30 | 8 |

Women

| Athlete | Event | Preliminaries | | Semifinals | | Final | |
| Athlete | Event | Points | Rank | Points | Rank | Points | Rank |
|---|---|---|---|---|---|---|---|
| Maddison Keeney | 1 m springboard | 283.80 | 1 Q | —N/a | | 314.95 | 1st place, gold medalist(s) |
| Esther Qin | 1 m springboard | 259.45 | 7 Q | —N/a | | 281.20 | 7 |
| Maddison Keeney | 3 m springboard | 310.95 | 6 Q | 324.80 | 5 Q | 335.50 | 5 |
| Anabelle Smith | 3 m springboard | 299.10 | 8 Q | 306.75 | 9 Q | 268.95 | 11 |
| Taneka Kovchenko | 10 m platform | 318.50 | 8 Q | 282.45 | 18 | Did not advance | |
| Melissa Wu | 10 m platform | 360.30 | 2 Q | 318.70 | 11 Q | 370.20 | 5 |
| Maddison Keeney; Anabelle Smith | 3 m synchronized springboard | 297.66 | 4 Q | —N/a | | 301.23 | 4 |
| Taneka Kovchenko; Melissa Wu | 10 m synchronized platform | 311.16 | 3 Q | —N/a | | 308.10 | 5 |

Mixed

| Athlete | Event | Final | |
| Athlete | Event | Points | Rank |
|---|---|---|---|
| Esther Qin; Matthew Carter | 3 m synchronized springboard | 282.00 | 5 |
| Melissa Wu; Domonic Bedggood | 10 m synchronized platform | 306.30 | 7 |
| Melissa Wu; Matthew Carter | Team | 325.35 | 12 |

== High diving ==
Australia qualified two female high divers.

| Athlete | Event | Points | Rank |
|---|---|---|---|
| Rhiannan Iffland | Women's high diving | 320.70 | 1st place, gold medalist(s) |
| Helena Merten | Women's high diving | 267.35 | 7 |

== Open water swimming ==
Australia has entered five open water swimmers

| Athlete | Event | Time | Rank |
|---|---|---|---|
| Jack Brazier | Men's 10 km | 1:52:32.8 | 17 |
| Jack Brazier | Men's 25 km | 5:16:35.0 | 21 |
| Jack McLoughlin | Men's 5 km | 55:04.1 | 22 |
| Chelsea Gubecka | Women's 10 km | 2:00:30.0 | 9 |
| Chelsea Gubecka | Women's 25 km | 5:28:41.6 | 9 |
| Kareena Lee | Women's 5 km | 59:28.9 | 10 |
| Kareena Lee | Women's 10 km | 2:02:08.1 | 19 |
| Kiah Melverton | Women's 5 km | 59:27.5 | =7 |
| Kareena Lee; Kiah Melverton; Jack Brazier; Jack McLoughlin | Mixed team | 54:42.9 | 4 |

== Swimming ==
Men

| Athlete | Event | Heat | | Semifinal | | Final | |
| Athlete | Event | Time | Rank | Time | Rank | Time | Rank |
|---|---|---|---|---|---|---|---|
| Josh Beaver | 50 m backstroke | 25.44 | 22 | Did not advance | | | |
| Josh Beaver | 200 m backstroke | 1:57.67 | 10 Q | 1:58.10 | 12 | Did not advance | |
| Jack Cartwright | 100 m freestyle | 48.43 | 4 Q | 48.97 | 5 Q | 48.24 | 7 |
| Daniel Cave | 100 m breaststroke | 1:00.22 | 20 | Did not advance | | | |
| Alexander Graham | 200 m freestyle | 1:48.67 | 34 | Did not advance | | | |
| Mack Horton | 200 m freestyle | 1:46.97 | 11 Q | 1:46.81 | 11 | Did not advance | |
| Mack Horton | 400 m freestyle | 3:45.60 | 5 Q | —N/a | | 3:43.85 | 2nd place, silver medalist(s) |
| Mack Horton | 800 m freestyle | DNS | | —N/a | | Did not advance | |
| Mack Horton | 1500 m freestyle | 14:59.24 | 7 Q | —N/a | | 14:47.70 | 3rd place, bronze medalist(s) |
| Zac Incerti | 100 m backstroke | 54.82 | 20 | Did not advance | | | |
| Grant Irvine | 100 m butterfly | 51.67 | 12 Q | 51.31 | 8 Q | 51.00 | 7 |
| Grant Irvine | 200 m butterfly | 1:56.61 | 15 Q | 1:56.33 | 12 | Did not advance | |
| Mitch Larkin | 50 m backstroke | 25.24 | =18 | Did not advance | | | |
| Mitch Larkin | 100 m backstroke | 53.72 | 7 Q | 53.19 | 6 Q | 53.24 | 6 |
| Mitch Larkin | 200 m backstroke | 1:58.00 | 13 Q | 1:59.10 | 15 | Did not advance | |
| Clyde Lewis | 200 m individual medley | 1:58.06 | 6 Q | 1:59.80 | 15 | Did not advance | |
| Clyde Lewis | 400 m individual medley | 4:20.32 | 21 | —N/a | | Did not advance | |
| Cameron McEvoy | 50 m freestyle | 21.95 | 7 Q | 21.89 | 9 | Did not advance | |
| Cameron McEvoy | 100 m freestyle | 47.97 | 1 Q | 47.95 | 4 Q | 47.92 | 4 |
| David McKeon | 400 m freestyle | 3:45.56 | 3 Q | —N/a | | 3:46.27 | 8 |
| Jack McLoughlin | 800 m freestyle | 7:53.51 | 13 | —N/a | | Did not advance | |
| Jack McLoughlin | 1500 m freestyle | 15:01.55 | 11 | —N/a | | Did not advance | |
| David Morgan | 50 m butterfly | 24.19 | 33 | Did not advance | | | |
| David Morgan | 100 m butterfly | 51.90 | 15 Q | 51.73 | 14 | Did not advance | |
| David Morgan | 200 m butterfly | 1:56.57 | 13 Q | 1:57.66 | 16 | Did not advance | |
| James Roberts | 50 m freestyle | 22.29 | 22 | Did not advance | | | |
| Matthew Wilson | 50 m breaststroke | 27.69 | 24 | Did not advance | | | |
| Matthew Wilson | 200 m breaststroke | 2:09.98 | 8 Q | 2:08.64 | 7 Q | 2:10.37 | 8 |
| Jack Cartwright; Alexander Graham; Zac Incerti; Cameron McEvoy | 4 × 100 m freestyle relay | 3:12.45 | 2 Q | —N/a | | DSQ | |
| Jack Cartwright; Alexander Graham; Mack Horton; Clyde Lewis; David McKeon* | 4 × 200 m freestyle relay | 7:05.68 | 1 Q | —N/a | | 7:05.98 | 4 |
| Mitch Larkin; Cameron McEvoy; David Morgan; Matthew Wilson | 4 × 100 m medley relay | 3:33.91 | 9 | —N/a | | Did not advance | |

Women

| Athlete | Event | Heat | | Semifinal | | Final | |
| Athlete | Event | Time | Rank | Time | Rank | Time | Rank |
|---|---|---|---|---|---|---|---|
| Holly Barratt | 50 m backstroke | 27.75 | 5 Q | 27.51 | =5 Q | 27.60 | 7 |
| Holly Barratt | 100 m backstroke | 59.87 | 7 Q | 59.95 | 11 | Did not advance | |
| Holly Barratt | 50 m butterfly | 25.94 | 12 Q | 25.76 | 9 | Did not advance | |
| Bronte Campbell | 50 m freestyle | 24.61 | 5 Q | 24.43 | 5 Q | 24.58 | =6 |
| Bronte Campbell | 100 m freestyle | 53.56 | 8 Q | 53.04 | 5 Q | 53.18 | 7 |
| Brittany Elmslie | 50 m butterfly | 26.61 | 21 | Did not advance | | | |
| Jessica Hansen | 50 m breaststroke | 30.59 | 7 Q | 30.67 | 9 | Did not advance | |
| Jessica Hansen | 100 m breaststroke | 1:07.12 | 9 Q | 1:07.21 | 13 | Did not advance | |
| Shayna Jack | 50 m freestyle | 24.85 | 12 Q | 24.69 | 13 | Did not advance | |
| Emma McKeon | 100 m freestyle | 53.47 | 7 Q | 53.20 | 8 Q | 53.21 | 8 |
| Emma McKeon | 200 m freestyle | 1:56.61 | 4 Q | 1:54.99 | 2 Q | 1:55.18 | 2nd place, silver medalist(s) |
| Emma McKeon | 100 m butterfly | 56.81 | 3 Q | 56.23 | 2 Q | 56.18 OC | 2nd place, silver medalist(s) |
| Kaylee McKeown | 200 m backstroke | 2:09.42 | 8 Q | 2:07.40 | 6 Q | 2:06.76 WJ | 4 |
| Kaylee McKeown | 400 m individual medley | 4:43.61 | 16 | —N/a | | Did not advance | |
| Taylor McKeown | 100 m breaststroke | 1:06.64 | 5 Q | 1:06.93 | 9 | Did not advance | |
| Taylor McKeown | 200 m breaststroke | 2:24.31 | 3 Q | 2:22.10 | 3 Q | 2:23.06 | 7 |
| Leah Neale | 400 m freestyle | 4:13.38 | 16 | —N/a | | Did not advance | |
| Kotuku Ngawati | 200 m individual medley | 2:13.03 | 16 Q | 2:14.07 | 16 | Did not advance | |
| Emily Seebohm | 50 m backstroke | 27.91 | 8 Q | 27.51 | =5 Q | 27.37 OC | 4 |
| Emily Seebohm | 100 m backstroke | 58.95 | 3 Q | 58.85 | 2 Q | 58.59 | 3rd place, bronze medalist(s) |
| Emily Seebohm | 200 m backstroke | 2:07.94 | 3 Q | 2:05.81 =OC | 1 Q | 2:05.68 OC | 1st place, gold medalist(s) |
| Brianna Throssell | 100 m butterfly | 58.66 | 16 Q | 58.21 | 12 | Did not advance | |
| Brianna Throssell | 200 m butterfly | 2:08.98 | 11 Q | 2:10.58 | 16 | Did not advance | |
| Ariarne Titmus | 200 m freestyle | 1:58.79 | 17 | Did not advance | | | |
| Ariarne Titmus | 400 m freestyle | 4:04.26 | 3 Q | —N/a | | 4:04.26 | 4 |
| Ariarne Titmus | 800 m freestyle | 8:37.10 | 14 | —N/a | | Did not advance | |
| Bronte Campbell; Brittany Elmslie; Shayna Jack; Emma McKeon; Emily Seebohm*; Madison Wilson* | 4 × 100 m freestyle relay | 3:35.18 | 3 Q | —N/a | | 3:32.01 | 2nd place, silver medalist(s) |
| Shayna Jack*; Emma McKeon; Leah Neale*; Kotuku Ngawati; Ariarne Titmus; Madison Wilson | 4 × 200 m freestyle relay | 7:54.74 | 4 Q | —N/a | | 7:48.51 | 3rd place, bronze medalist(s) |
| Holly Barratt*; Bronte Campbell; Jessica Hansen*; Shayna Jack*; Emma McKeon; Taylor McKeown; Emily Seebohm; Brianna Throssell* | 4 × 100 m medley relay | 3:58.74 | 5 Q | —N/a | | 3:54.29 | 3rd place, bronze medalist(s) |

Mixed

| Athlete | Event | Heat | | Final | |
| Athlete | Event | Time | Rank | Time | Rank |
|---|---|---|---|---|---|
| Alexander Graham; Zac Incerti*; Louis Townsend; Brittany Elmslie; Brianna Throssell*; Madison Wilson | 4 × 100 m freestyle relay | 3:27.49 | 8 Q | 3:25.51 | 8 |
| Bronte Campbell; Daniel Cave; Grant Irvine*; Shayna Jack*; Mitch Larkin; Emma McKeon; Kaylee McKeown*; Matthew Wilson* | 4 × 100 m medley relay | 3:44.13 OC | 2 Q | 3:41.21 OC | 2nd place, silver medalist(s) |

== Synchronized swimming ==
Australia's synchronized swimming team consisted of 12 athletes (12 female).

Women

| Athlete | Event | Preliminaries | | Final | |
| Athlete | Event | Points | Rank | Points | Rank |
|---|---|---|---|---|---|
| Hannah Cross; Jane Fruzynski; Kiera Gazzard; Danielle Kettlewell; Kirsten Kinash (R); Sue-Ann Lim (R); Nikita Pablo; Rachel Presser; Emily Rogers; Amie Thompson | Team technical routine | 72.6056 | 20 | Did not advance | |
| Hannah Cross; Jane Fruzynski; Kiera Gazzard; Danielle Kettlewell; Erica Li (R); Nikita Pablo; Rachel Presser; Emily Rogers; Amie Thompson; Kazia Zenke (R) | Team free routine | 76.0333 | 18 | Did not advance | |

Legend: (R) = Reserve Athlete

== Water polo ==
Australia qualified both a men's and women's teams.

=== Men's tournament ===
Team roster

- Edward Slade
- Timothy Putt
- George Ford
- Joe Kayes
- Nathan Power
- Lachlan Edwards
- Jarrod Gilchrist
- Aaron Younger (C)
- Andrew Ford
- James Fannon
- Lachlan Hollis
- Nicolas Brooks
- Anthony Hrysanthos

Group play

| Pos | Team | Pld | W | D | L | GF | GA | GD | Pts | Qualification |
|---|---|---|---|---|---|---|---|---|---|---|
| 1 | Hungary (H) | 3 | 2 | 1 | 0 | 35 | 19 | +16 | 5 (Note: Hungary placed higher because of better goal difference against Australia.) | Quarterfinals |
| 2 | Italy | 3 | 2 | 1 | 0 | 40 | 23 | +17 | 5 | Playoffs |
| 3 | Australia | 3 | 1 | 0 | 2 | 19 | 36 | −17 | 2 | Playoffs |
| 4 | France | 3 | 0 | 0 | 3 | 26 | 42 | −16 | 0 | |

Source: Sportresult
Rules for classification: 1) points; 2) head-to-head points; 3) head-to-head goal difference; 4) head-to-head number of goals scored; 5) better result against higher placed team.
(H) Hosts
Notes:

| 17 July 2017; 20:10 | Report | Australia | 3–13 | Hungary | Alfréd Hajós National Swimming Stadium, Budapest; Referees: Andrej Franulović (CRO), Steven Rotsart (USA) |
| 17 July 2017; 20:10 | Report | Score by quarters: 1–1, 1–4, 1–2, 0–6 | | | Alfréd Hajós National Swimming Stadium, Budapest; Referees: Andrej Franulović (CRO), Steven Rotsart (USA) |
| 17 July 2017; 20:10 | Report | three players 1 | Goals | Varga 4 | Alfréd Hajós National Swimming Stadium, Budapest; Referees: Andrej Franulović (CRO), Steven Rotsart (USA) |

| 19 July 2017; 09:30 | Report | France | 10–11 | Australia | Alfréd Hajós National Swimming Stadium, Budapest; Referees: Vojin Putniković (SRB), Andrej Franulović (CRO) |
| 19 July 2017; 09:30 | Report | Score by quarters: 5–4, 1–2, 1–3, 3–2 | | | Alfréd Hajós National Swimming Stadium, Budapest; Referees: Vojin Putniković (SRB), Andrej Franulović (CRO) |
| 19 July 2017; 09:30 | Report | Crousillat 3 | Goals | Younger 3 | Alfréd Hajós National Swimming Stadium, Budapest; Referees: Vojin Putniković (SRB), Andrej Franulović (CRO) |

| 21 July 2017; 21:30 | Report | Australia | 5–13 | Italy | Alfréd Hajós National Swimming Stadium, Budapest; Referees: Francesc Buch (ESP), Stanko Ivanovski (MNE) |
| 21 July 2017; 21:30 | Report | Score by quarters: 2–5, 0–3, 3–2, 0–3 | | | Alfréd Hajós National Swimming Stadium, Budapest; Referees: Francesc Buch (ESP), Stanko Ivanovski (MNE) |
| 21 July 2017; 21:30 | Report | five players 1 | Goals | Figlioli, Bodegas 3 | Alfréd Hajós National Swimming Stadium, Budapest; Referees: Francesc Buch (ESP), Stanko Ivanovski (MNE) |

Playoffs

| 23 July 2017; 13:30 | Report | Brazil | 3–8 | Australia | Alfréd Hajós National Swimming Stadium, Budapest; Referees: Georgios Stavridis (GRE), Andrej Franulović (CRO) |
| 23 July 2017; 13:30 | Report | Score by quarters: 2–2, 0–2, 1–2, 0–2 | | | Alfréd Hajós National Swimming Stadium, Budapest; Referees: Georgios Stavridis (GRE), Andrej Franulović (CRO) |
| 23 July 2017; 13:30 | Report | G. Guimarães 2 | Goals | Kayes 3 | Alfréd Hajós National Swimming Stadium, Budapest; Referees: Georgios Stavridis (GRE), Andrej Franulović (CRO) |

Quarterfinals

| 25 July 2017; 16:10 | Report | Serbia | 15–5 | Australia | Alfréd Hajós National Swimming Stadium, Budapest; Referees: Sergey Naumov (RUS), Frank Ohme (GER) |
| 25 July 2017; 16:10 | Report | Score by quarters: 4–1, 4–2, 4–2, 3–0 | | | Alfréd Hajós National Swimming Stadium, Budapest; Referees: Sergey Naumov (RUS), Frank Ohme (GER) |
| 25 July 2017; 16:10 | Report | Filipović 3 | Goals | five players 1 | Alfréd Hajós National Swimming Stadium, Budapest; Referees: Sergey Naumov (RUS), Frank Ohme (GER) |

5th–8th place semifinals

| 27 July 2017; 15:00 | Report | Australia | 4–8 | Italy | Alfréd Hajós National Swimming Stadium, Budapest; Referees: Péter Molnár (HUN), Vojin Putniković (SRB) |
| 27 July 2017; 15:00 | Report | Score by quarters: 2–4, 2–2, 1–1, 0–2 | | | Alfréd Hajós National Swimming Stadium, Budapest; Referees: Péter Molnár (HUN), Vojin Putniković (SRB) |
| 27 July 2017; 15:00 | Report | Hollis 2 | Goals | Di Fulvio, Figlioli 2 | Alfréd Hajós National Swimming Stadium, Budapest; Referees: Péter Molnár (HUN), Vojin Putniković (SRB) |

Seventh place game

| 29 July 2017; 12:00 | Report | Russia | 7–10 | Australia | Alfréd Hajós National Swimming Stadium, Budapest; Referees: Stanko Ivanovski (MNE), Frank Ohme (GER) |
| 29 July 2017; 12:00 | Report | Score by quarters: 3–4, 2–2, 1–3, 1–1 | | | Alfréd Hajós National Swimming Stadium, Budapest; Referees: Stanko Ivanovski (MNE), Frank Ohme (GER) |
| 29 July 2017; 12:00 | Report | Kholod 3 | Goals | Younger 2 | Alfréd Hajós National Swimming Stadium, Budapest; Referees: Stanko Ivanovski (MNE), Frank Ohme (GER) |

=== Women's tournament ===
Team roster

- Lea Yanitsas
- Keesja Gofers
- Hannah Buckling
- Bronte Halligan
- Isobel Bishop
- Amy Ridge
- Rowie Webster (C)
- Jessica Zimmerman
- Joe Arancini
- Lena Mihailovic
- Morgan Baxter
- Madeleine Steere
- Lilian Hedges

Group play

| Pos | Team | Pld | W | D | L | GF | GA | GD | Pts | Qualification |
|---|---|---|---|---|---|---|---|---|---|---|
| 1 | Greece | 3 | 2 | 0 | 1 | 37 | 22 | +15 | 4 (Note: Greece 2 Pts, +1 GD; Australia 2 Pts, 0 GD; Russia 2 Pts, −1 GD) | Quarterfinals |
| 2 | Australia | 3 | 2 | 0 | 1 | 32 | 20 | +12 | 4 | Playoffs |
| 3 | Russia | 3 | 2 | 0 | 1 | 29 | 21 | +8 | 4 | Playoffs |
| 4 | Kazakhstan | 3 | 0 | 0 | 3 | 15 | 50 | −35 | 0 | |

Source: Sportresult
Rules for classification: 1) points; 2) head-to-head points; 3) head-to-head goal difference; 4) head-to-head number of goals scored; 5) Goal difference.
Notes:

| 16 July 2017; 18:50 | Report | Australia | 16–4 | Kazakhstan | Alfréd Hajós National Swimming Stadium, Budapest; Referees: Mikhail Dykman (CAN), Dion Willis (RSA) |
| 16 July 2017; 18:50 | Report | Score by quarters: 4–1, 4–1, 4–2, 4–0 | | | Alfréd Hajós National Swimming Stadium, Budapest; Referees: Mikhail Dykman (CAN), Dion Willis (RSA) |
| 16 July 2017; 18:50 | Report | Webster 5 | Goals | Zakirova 2 | Alfréd Hajós National Swimming Stadium, Budapest; Referees: Mikhail Dykman (CAN), Dion Willis (RSA) |

| 18 July 2017; 17:30 | Report | Australia | 8–5 | Russia | Alfréd Hajós National Swimming Stadium, Budapest; Referees: Alessandro Severo (ITA), Francesc Buch (ESP) |
| 18 July 2017; 17:30 | Report | Score by quarters: 1–2, 2–1, 3–1, 2–1 | | | Alfréd Hajós National Swimming Stadium, Budapest; Referees: Alessandro Severo (ITA), Francesc Buch (ESP) |
| 18 July 2017; 17:30 | Report | three players 2 | Goals | Borisova 2 | Alfréd Hajós National Swimming Stadium, Budapest; Referees: Alessandro Severo (ITA), Francesc Buch (ESP) |

| 20 July 2017; 10:50 | Report | Australia | 8–11 | Greece | Alfréd Hajós National Swimming Stadium, Budapest; Referees: Adrian Alexandrescu (ROU), Vojin Putniković (SRB) |
| 20 July 2017; 10:50 | Report | Score by quarters: 2–2, 3–3, 2–3, 1–3 | | | Alfréd Hajós National Swimming Stadium, Budapest; Referees: Adrian Alexandrescu (ROU), Vojin Putniković (SRB) |
| 20 July 2017; 10:50 | Report | Gofers 3 | Goals | Asimaki, El. Plevritou 3 | Alfréd Hajós National Swimming Stadium, Budapest; Referees: Adrian Alexandrescu (ROU), Vojin Putniković (SRB) |

Playoffs

| 22 July 2017; 22:00 | Report | France | 2–16 | Australia | Alfréd Hajós National Swimming Stadium, Budapest; Referees: Dion Willis (RSA), Mikhail Dykman (CAN) |
| 22 July 2017; 22:00 | Report | Score by quarters: 0–5, 0–4, 1–1, 1–6 | | | Alfréd Hajós National Swimming Stadium, Budapest; Referees: Dion Willis (RSA), Mikhail Dykman (CAN) |
| 22 July 2017; 22:00 | Report | Millot, Battu 1 | Goals | Arancini 4 | Alfréd Hajós National Swimming Stadium, Budapest; Referees: Dion Willis (RSA), Mikhail Dykman (CAN) |

Quarterfinals

| 24 July 2017; 16:10 | Report | United States | 7–5 | Australia | Alfréd Hajós National Swimming Stadium, Budapest; Referees: Francesc Buch (ESP), Frank Ohme (GER) |
| 24 July 2017; 16:10 | Report | Score by quarters: 0–0, 3–0, 2–2, 2–3 | | | Alfréd Hajós National Swimming Stadium, Budapest; Referees: Francesc Buch (ESP), Frank Ohme (GER) |
| 24 July 2017; 16:10 | Report | Musselman, Raney 2 | Goals | Gofers 4 | Alfréd Hajós National Swimming Stadium, Budapest; Referees: Francesc Buch (ESP), Frank Ohme (GER) |

5th–8th place semifinals

| 26 July 2017; 13:30 | Report | Italy | 11–11 ^{(7–6 PSO)} (PSO) | Australia | Alfréd Hajós National Swimming Stadium, Budapest; Referees: Sergey Naumov (RUS), Steven Rotsart (USA) |
| 26 July 2017; 13:30 | Report | Score by quarters: 5–3, 2–3, 1–3, 3–2 PSO: 7–6 | | | Alfréd Hajós National Swimming Stadium, Budapest; Referees: Sergey Naumov (RUS), Steven Rotsart (USA) |
| 26 July 2017; 13:30 | Report | Bianconi 5 | Goals | Webster 4 | Alfréd Hajós National Swimming Stadium, Budapest; Referees: Sergey Naumov (RUS), Steven Rotsart (USA) |

Seventh place game

| 28 July 2017; 12:00 | Report | Australia | 6–8 | Greece | Alfréd Hajós National Swimming Stadium, Budapest; Referees: Natacha Florestano (BRA), Andrej Franulović (CRO) |
| 28 July 2017; 12:00 | Report | Score by quarters: 0–1, 1–4, 3–3, 2–0 | | | Alfréd Hajós National Swimming Stadium, Budapest; Referees: Natacha Florestano (BRA), Andrej Franulović (CRO) |
| 28 July 2017; 12:00 | Report | six players 1 | Goals | Tsoukala 3 | Alfréd Hajós National Swimming Stadium, Budapest; Referees: Natacha Florestano (BRA), Andrej Franulović (CRO) |
