= Australia at the 2023 World Aquatics Championships =

- Flag of Australia
- World Aquatics code: AUS
- National federation: Swimming Australia
- Website: swimming.org.au

in Fukuoka, Japan
- Competitors: 91 in 6 sports
- Medals Ranked 2nd: Gold 15 Silver 9 Bronze 6 Total 30

World Aquatics Championships appearances
- 1973; 1975; 1978; 1982; 1986; 1991; 1994; 1998; 2001; 2003; 2005; 2007; 2009; 2011; 2013; 2015; 2017; 2019; 2022; 2023; 2024; 2025

Australia competed at the 2023 World Aquatics Championships in Fukuoka, Japan from 14 to 30 July.

== Medalists ==
Medal	Name	Sport	Event	Date
1st place, gold medalist(s)	Cassiel Rousseau	Diving	Men's 10 metre platform	22 July 2023
1st place, gold medalist(s)	Samuel Short	Swimming	Men's 400 metre freestyle	23 July 2023
1st place, gold medalist(s)	Ariarne Titmus	Swimming	Women's 400 metre freestyle	23 July 2023
1st place, gold medalist(s)	Mollie O'Callaghan Shayna Jack Meg Harris Emma McKeon; Brianna Throssell (heat); Madison Wilson (heat)	Swimming	Women's 4 × 100 metre freestyle relay	23 July 2023
1st place, gold medalist(s)	Jack Cartwright Flynn Southam Kai Taylor Kyle Chalmers; Matthew Temple (heat)	Swimming	Men's 4 × 100 metre freestyle relay	23 July 2023
1st place, gold medalist(s)	Kaylee McKeown	Swimming	Women's 100 metre backstroke	25 July 2023
1st place, gold medalist(s)	Rhiannan Iffland	High diving	Women's high diving	26 July 2023
1st place, gold medalist(s)	Mollie O'Callaghan	Swimming	Women's 200 metre freestyle	26 July 2023
1st place, gold medalist(s)	Kyle Chalmers	Swimming	Men's 100 metre freestyle	27 July 2023
1st place, gold medalist(s)	Kaylee McKeown	Swimming	Women's 50 metre backstroke	27 July 2023
1st place, gold medalist(s)	Mollie O'Callaghan Shayna Jack Brianna Throssell Ariarne Titmus; Madison Wilson (heat); Lani Pallister (heat); Kiah Melverton (heat)	Swimming	Women's 4 × 200 metre freestyle relay	27 July 2023
1st place, gold medalist(s)	Mollie O'Callaghan	Swimming	Women's 100 metre freestyle	28 July 2023
1st place, gold medalist(s)	Cameron McEvoy	Swimming	Men's 50 metre freestyle	29 July 2023
1st place, gold medalist(s)	Kaylee McKeown	Swimming	Women's 200 metre backstroke	29 July 2023
1st place, gold medalist(s)	Jack Cartwright Kyle Chalmers Shayna Jack Mollie O'Callaghan; Flynn Southam (heat) Madison Wilson (heat) Meg Harris (heat)	Swimming	Mixed 4 × 100 metre freestyle relay	29 July 2023
2nd place, silver medalist(s)	Chelsea Gubecka	Open water swimming	Women's 10 km	15 July 2023
2nd place, silver medalist(s)	Domonic Bedggood; Maddison Keeney	Diving	Mixed synchronized 3 metre springboard	22 July 2023
2nd place, silver medalist(s)	Samuel Short	Swimming	Men's 800 metre freestyle	26 July 2023
2nd place, silver medalist(s)	Ariarne Titmus	Swimming	Women's 200 metre freestyle	26 July 2023
2nd place, silver medalist(s)	Kaylee McKeown Zac Stubblety-Cook Matthew Temple Shayna Jack; Bradley Woodward (heat); Samuel Williamson (heat); Emma McKeon (heat)	Swimming	Mixed 4 × 100 metre medley relay	26 July 2023
2nd place, silver medalist(s)	Elizabeth Dekkers	Swimming	Women's 200 metre butterfly	27 July 2023
2nd place, silver medalist(s)	Zac Stubblety-Cook	Swimming	Men's 200 metre breaststroke	28 July 2023
2nd place, silver medalist(s)	Shayna Jack	Swimming	Women's 50 metre freestyle	30 July 2023
2nd place, silver medalist(s)	Kaylee McKeown Abbey Harkin Emma McKeon Mollie O'Callaghan; Madison Wilson (heat) Brianna Throssell (heat) Meg Harris (heat)	Swimming	Women's 4 × 100 metre medley relay	30 July 2023
3rd place, bronze medalist(s)	Chelsea Gubecka; Moesha Johnson; Nicholas Sloman; Kyle Lee	Open water swimming	Team Relay	20 July 2023
3rd place, bronze medalist(s)	Kai Taylor Kyle Chalmers Alexander Graham Thomas Neill; Elijah Winnington (heat); Flynn Southam (heat)	Swimming	Men's 4 × 200 metre freestyle relay	28 July 2023
3rd place, bronze medalist(s)	Ariarne Titmus	Swimming	Women's 800 metre freestyle	29 July 2023
3rd place, bronze medalist(s)	Samuel Short	Swimming	Men's 1500 metre freestyle	30 July 2023
3rd place, bronze medalist(s)	Jenna Forrester	Swimming	Women's 400 metre individual medley	30 July 2023
3rd place, bronze medalist(s)	Bradley Woodward Zac Stubblety-Cook Matthew Temple Kyle Chalmers; Samuel Williamson (heat) Kai Taylor (heat)	Swimming	Men's 4 × 100 metre medley relay	30 July 2023

== Athletes by discipline ==
The following is the list of number of competitors participating at the Championships per discipline.

Sport	Men	Women	Total
Artistic swimming	0	11	11
Diving	4	5	9
High diving	0	3	3
Open water swimming	4	4*	8*
Swimming	16	15*	31*
Water polo	15	15	30
Total	39	52	91

- Moesha Johnson was compete in both open water swimming and indoor swimming.

== Artistic swimming ==
Australia's artistic swimming team consisted of eleven athletes (all women).

Women

Athlete	Event	Preliminaries		Final	
Athlete	Event	Points	Rank	Points	Rank
Carolyn Buckle; Kiera Gazzard	Duet technical routine	189.6634	19	Did not advance	
Georgia Courage-Gardiner; Zoe Poulis	Duet free routine	139.7875	22	Did not advance	

Mixed

Athlete	Event	Preliminaries		Final	
Athlete	Event	Points	Rank	Points	Rank
Hannah Burkhill; Natalia Caloiero; Georgia Courage-Gardener; Alessandra Ho; Margo Joseph-Kuo; Anastasia Kusmawan; Zoe Poulis; Milena Waldman	Team acrobatic routine	159.7100	14	Did not advance	
Hannah Burkhill; Natalia Caloiero; Georgia Courage-Gardener; Alessandra Ho; Margo Joseph-Kuo; Pam Kurosawa; Anastasia Kusmawan; Zoe Poulis	Team free routine	191.7478	11 Q	221.6416	8
Carolyn Buckle; Hannah Burkhill; Zoe Poulis; Milena Waldman; Kiera Gazzard; Alessandra Ho; Georgia Courage-Gardener; Margo Joseph-Kuo	Team technical routine	200.7701	11 Q	196.4087	12

== Diving ==
Australia's diving team consisted of nine athletes (4 men and 5 women). Lauren Flint was originally named in the team, however withdrew days before competition due to breaking her elbow in training.

Men

Athlete	Event	Preliminaries		Semifinal		Final	
Athlete	Event	Points	Rank	Points	Rank	Points	Rank
Li Shixin	1 m springboard	374.50	4 Q	—N/a		400.55	5
Li Shixin	3 m springboard	393.45	14 Q	394.55	15	Did not advance	
Sam Fricker	10 m platform	370.35	19	Did not advance			
Cassiel Rousseau	10 m platform	423.80	5 Q	494.10	2 Q	520.85	1st place, gold medalist(s)
Sam Fricker; Li Shixin	3 m synchronized springboard	348.06	10 Q	—N/a		356.49	12
Domonic Bedggood; Cassiel Rousseau	10 m synchronized platform	377.70	6 Q	—N/a		407.46	5

Women

Athlete	Event	Preliminaries		Semifinal		Final	
Athlete	Event	Points	Rank	Points	Rank	Points	Rank
Brittany O'Brien	1 m springboard	221.45	27	Did not advance			
Georgia Sheehan	1 m springboard	242.25	6 Q	—N/a		256.75	9
Maddison Keeney	3 m springboard	301.00	6 Q	319.75	6 Q	327.95	4
Georgia Sheehan	3 m springboard	274.90	19	Did not advance			
Nikita Hains	10 m platform	288.50	16 Q	286.50	15	Did not advance	
Milly Puckeridge	10 m platform	267.90	21	Did not advance			
Brittany O'Brien; Georgia Sheehan	3 m synchronized springboard	275.40	8 Q	—N/a		279.60	6

Mixed

Athlete	Event	Final	
Athlete	Event	Points	Rank
Domonic Bedggood; Maddison Keeney	3 m synchronized springboard	307.38	2nd place, silver medalist(s)
Nikita Hains; Maddison Keeney; Cassiel Rousseau; Li Shixin	Team event	426.15	4

== High diving ==
Australia's high diving team consisted of three athletes (all women).

Women

Athlete	Event	Points	Rank
Emily Chinnock	Women's high diving	194.20	19
Rhiannan Iffland	Women's high diving	357.40	1st place, gold medalist(s)
Xantheia Pennisi	Women's high diving	290.20	6

== Open water swimming ==
Australia's open water swimming team consisted of eight athletes (4 men and 4 women).

Men

Athlete	Event	Time	Rank
Kyle Lee	Men's 5 km	55:32.70	8
Jack Wilson	Men's 5 km	56:24.00	13
Bailey Armstrong	Men's 10 km	1:55:32.8	34
Nicholas Sloman	Men's 10 km	1:51:42.2	7

Women

Athlete	Event	Time	Rank
Bianca Crisp	Women's 5 km	1:01:19.8	20
Moesha Johnson	Women's 5 km	59:46.3	10
Maddy Gough	Women's 10 km	2:04:18.6	23
Chelsea Gubecka	Women's 10 km	2:02:38.1	2nd place, silver medalist(s)

Mixed

Athlete	Event	Time	Rank
Chelsea Gubecka; Moesha Johnson; Nicholas Sloman; Kyle Lee	Team relay	1:11:26.7	3rd place, bronze medalist(s)

== Swimming ==
Australia's swimming team consisted of thirty-one athletes (16 men and 15 women).

Men

Athlete	Event	Heat		Semifinal		Final	
Athlete	Event	Time	Rank	Time	Rank	Time	Rank
Cameron McEvoy	50 m freestyle	21.35	1 Q	21.25	1 Q	21.06 OC	1st place, gold medalist(s)
Isaac Cooper	50 m freestyle	21.82	5 Q	21.65	4 Q	21.70	4
Kyle Chalmers	100 m freestyle	47.71	3 Q	47.52	2 Q	47.15	1st place, gold medalist(s)
Flynn Southam	100 m freestyle	48.18	11 Q	48.15	11	Did not advance	
Alexander Graham	200 m freestyle	1:46.58	12 Q	1:46.61	13	Did not advance	
Kai Taylor	200 m freestyle	1:46.94	20	Did not advance			
Samuel Short	400 m freestyle	3:42.44	1 Q	—N/a		3:40.68	1st place, gold medalist(s)
Elijah Winnington	400 m freestyle	3:44.63	7 Q	—N/a		3:44.26	7
Samuel Short	800 m freestyle	7:40.90	1 Q	—N/a		7:37.76 OC	2nd place, silver medalist(s)
Elijah Winnington	800 m freestyle	7:49.24	17	—N/a		Did not advance	
Samuel Short	1500 m freestyle	14:53.38	6 Q	—N/a		14:37.28	3rd place, bronze medalist(s)
Isaac Cooper	50 m backstroke	24.73	6 Q	24.86	9	Did not advance	
Bradley Woodward	50 m backstroke	DNS					
Isaac Cooper	100 m backstroke	53.95	17	Did not advance			
Bradley Woodward	100 m backstroke	53.72	11 Q	53.73	13	Did not advance	
Bradley Woodward	200 m backstroke	1:57.14	1 Q	1:56.16	6 Q	1:56.29	6
Samuel Williamson	50 m breaststroke	26.76	3 Q	27.06	8 Q	26.82	4
Zac Stubblety-Cook	100 m breaststroke	1:00.22	16 Q	59.69	12	Did not advance	
Zac Stubblety-Cook	200 m breaststroke	2:08.98	1 Q	2:07.37	1 Q	2:06.40	2nd place, silver medalist(s)
Shaun Champion	50 m butterfly	23.60	26	Did not advance			
Cameron McEvoy	50 m butterfly	23.40	18	Did not advance			
Shaun Champion	100 m butterfly	52.15	24	Did not advance			
Matthew Temple	100 m butterfly	50.76	1 Q	50.89	4 Q	50.81	4
Matthew Temple	200 m butterfly	1:56.51	16 Q	Withdrew			
Thomas Neill	200 m individual medley	1:58.30	8 Q	1:57.51	10	Did not advance	
Brendon Smith	200 m individual medley	1:59.03	15 Q	1:59.35	15	Did not advance	
Thomas Neill	400 m individual medley	4:14.98	11	—N/a		Did not advance	
Brendon Smith	400 m individual medley	4:11.75	5 Q	—N/a		4:10.37	5
Jack Cartwright; Flynn Southam; Kai Taylor; Kyle Chalmers; Matthew Temple (heat)	4 × 100 m freestyle relay	3:11.64	2 Q	—N/a		3:10.16	1st place, gold medalist(s)
Kai Taylor; Kyle Chalmers; Alexander Graham; Thomas Neill; Elijah Winnington (heat); Flynn Southam (heat)	4 × 200 m freestyle relay	7:04.37	1 Q	—N/a		7:02.13	3rd place, bronze medalist(s)
Bradley Woodward; Zac Stubblety-Cook; Matthew Temple; Kyle Chalmers; Samuel Williamson (heat); Kai Taylor (heat)	4 × 100 m medley relay	3:31.75	3 Q	—N/a		3:29.62	3rd place, bronze medalist(s)

Women

Athlete	Event	Heat		Semifinal		Final	
Athlete	Event	Time	Rank	Time	Rank	Time	Rank
Shayna Jack	50 m freestyle	24.02	2 Q	24.01	2 Q	24.10	2nd place, silver medalist(s)
Emma McKeon	50 m freestyle	24.69	8 Q	24.67	7 Q	24.35	5
Emma McKeon	100 m freestyle	53.40	3 Q	53.00	4 Q	52.83	5
Mollie O'Callaghan	100 m freestyle	54.01	7 Q	52.86	2 Q	52.16	1st place, gold medalist(s)
Mollie O'Callaghan	200 m freestyle	1:55.68	1 Q	1:54.91	3 Q	1:52.85 WR	1st place, gold medalist(s)
Ariarne Titmus	200 m freestyle	1:56.20	3 Q	1:54.64	1 Q	1:53.01	2nd place, silver medalist(s)
Lani Pallister	400 m freestyle	4:03.49	6 Q	—N/a		4:05.17	6
Ariarne Titmus	400 m freestyle	4:01.39	2 Q	—N/a		3:55.38 WR	1st place, gold medalist(s)
Lani Pallister	800 m freestyle	8:21.38	5 Q	—N/a		8:21.33	7
Ariarne Titmus	800 m freestyle	8:21.25	4 Q	—N/a		8:13.59 OC	3rd place, bronze medalist(s)
Moesha Johnson	1500 m freestyle	16:05.01	9	—N/a		Did not advance	
Lani Pallister	1500 m freestyle	15:58.11	3 Q	—N/a		15:49.17	5
Kaylee McKeown	50 m backstroke	27.60	4 Q	27.26	2 Q	27.08 OC	1st place, gold medalist(s)
Mollie O'Callaghan	50 m backstroke	DNS					
Kaylee McKeown	100 m backstroke	58.90	2 Q	58.48	2 Q	57.53 CR	1st place, gold medalist(s)
Madison Wilson	100 m backstroke	1:00.04	10 Q	59.63	9	Did not advance	
Jenna Forrester	200 m backstroke	2:10.46	10 Q	2:09.74	8 Q	2:11.44	8
Kaylee McKeown	200 m backstroke	2:09.30	5 Q	2:07.89	3 Q	2:03.85	1st place, gold medalist(s)
Abbey Harkin	50 m breaststroke	31.63	29	Did not advance			
Abbey Harkin	100 m breaststroke	1:06.86	15 Q	1:07.11	15	Did not advance	
Abbey Harkin	200 m breaststroke	2:25.11	6 Q	2:23.65	6 Q	2:24.55	7
Brianna Throssell	50 m butterfly	26.30	18	Did not advance			
Emma McKeon	100 m butterfly	57.05	2 Q	56.89	4 Q	56.88	4
Brianna Throssell	100 m butterfly	57.94	9 Q	57.14	6 Q	57.34	7
Abbey Connor	200 m butterfly	2:10.04	12 Q	2:10.35	14	Did not advance	
Elizabeth Dekkers	200 m butterfly	2:07.71	2 Q	2:07.11	4 Q	2:05.46	2nd place, silver medalist(s)
Jenna Forrester	200 m individual medley	2:09.79	6 Q	2:10.03	4 Q	2:08.98	4
Kaylee McKeown	200 m individual medley	2:09.50	2 Q	DSQ			
Jenna Forrester	400 m individual medley	4:35.88	1 Q	—N/a		4:32.30	3rd place, bronze medalist(s)
Kiah Melverton	400 m individual medley	4:41.96	13	—N/a		Did not advance	
Mollie O'Callaghan; Shayna Jack; Meg Harris; Emma McKeon; Brianna Throssell (heat); Madison Wilson (heat)	4 × 100 m freestyle relay	3:31.52	1 Q	—N/a		3:27.96 WR	1st place, gold medalist(s)
Mollie O'Callaghan; Shayna Jack; Brianna Throssell; Ariarne Titmus; Madison Wilson (heat); Lani Pallister (heat); Kiah Melverton (heat)	4 × 200 m freestyle relay	7:47.84	2 Q	—N/a		7:37.50 WR	1st place, gold medalist(s)
Kaylee McKeown; Abbey Harkin; Emma McKeon; Mollie O'Callaghan; Madison Wilson (heat); Brianna Throssell (heat); Meg Harris (heat)	4 × 100 m medley relay	3:57.74	4 Q	—N/a		3:53.37	2nd place, silver medalist(s)

Mixed

Athlete	Event	Heat		Semifinal		Final	
Athlete	Event	Time	Rank	Time	Rank	Time	Rank
Jack Cartwright; Kyle Chalmers; Shayna Jack; Mollie O'Callaghan; Flynn Southam (heat); Madison Wilson (heat); Meg Harris (heat)	4 × 100 m freestyle relay	3:21.88	1 Q	—N/a		3:18.83 WR	1st place, gold medalist(s)
Kaylee McKeown; Zac Stubblety-Cook; Matthew Temple; Shayna Jack; Bradley Woodward (heat); Samuel Williamson (heat); Emma McKeon (heat)	4 × 100 m medley relay	3:40.87	2 Q	—N/a		3:39.03	2nd place, silver medalist(s)

== Water polo ==
Summary

Team	Event	Group stage				Playoff	Quarterfinal	Semifinal	Final / BM	
Team	Event	Opposition Score	Opposition Score	Opposition Score	Rank	Opposition Score	Opposition Score	Opposition Score	Opposition Score	Rank
Australia	Men's tournament	Greece; L 9–13	United States; L 8–16	Kazakhstan; W 22–6	3 QP	France; L 8–11	—N/a	Japan; W 16–15	Croatia; L 10–17	10
Australia	Women's tournament	France; W 10–8	United States; L 5–9	China; W 11–7	2 QP	Israel; W 16–7	Greece; W 9–8	Spain; L 10–12	Italy; L 14–16	4

=== Men's tournament ===
Team roster

The following is the Australian roster.

Head coach: Timothy Hamill

- 1 Nick Porter GK
- 2 Angus Lambie FP
- 3 George Ford FP
- 4 Charlie Negus FP
- 5 Nathan Power FP
- 6 Lachlan Edwards FP
- 7 Luke Pavillard FP
- 8 Matthew Byrnes FP
- 9 Marcus Berehulak FP
- 10 Timothy Putt FP
- 11 Chaz Poot FP
- 12 Blake Edwards FP
- 13 John Hedges GK
- Reilly Townsend FP
- Samuel Slobodien FP

Group play

Pos	Team	Pld	W	PSW	PSL	L	GF	GA	GD	Pts	Qualification
1	Greece	3	3	0	0	0	46	25	+21	9	Quarterfinals
2	United States	3	2	0	0	1	48	28	+20	6	Playoffs
3	Australia	3	1	0	0	2	39	35	+4	3	Playoffs
4	Kazakhstan	3	0	0	0	3	13	58	−45	0	

Source: Sportresult
Rules for classification: 1) points; 2) head-to-head points; 3) head-to-head goal difference; 4) head-to-head number of goals scored; 5) Goal difference.

17 July 2023; 10:30	Report	Australia	9–13	Greece	Marine Messe Fukuoka, Fukuoka; Referees: Adrian-Tiberiu Alexandrescu (ROU), Veselin Mišković (MNE)
17 July 2023; 10:30	Report	Score by quarters: 2–2, 1–3, 3–3, 3–5			Marine Messe Fukuoka, Fukuoka; Referees: Adrian-Tiberiu Alexandrescu (ROU), Veselin Mišković (MNE)
17 July 2023; 10:30	Report	Power 4	Goals	Argyropoulos 3	Marine Messe Fukuoka, Fukuoka; Referees: Adrian-Tiberiu Alexandrescu (ROU), Veselin Mišković (MNE)

19 July 2023; 20:30	Report	United States	16–8	Australia	Marine Messe Fukuoka, Fukuoka; Referees: Boris Margeta (SLO), Vojin Putniković (SRB)
19 July 2023; 20:30	Report	Score by quarters: 3–4, 3–2, 4–1, 6–1			Marine Messe Fukuoka, Fukuoka; Referees: Boris Margeta (SLO), Vojin Putniković (SRB)
19 July 2023; 20:30	Report	Daube 5	Goals	Pavillard, Power 3	Marine Messe Fukuoka, Fukuoka; Referees: Boris Margeta (SLO), Vojin Putniković (SRB)

21 July 2023; 16:00	Report	Australia	22–6	Kazakhstan	Marine Messe Fukuoka, Fukuoka; Referees: Tamás Kovács-Csatlós (HUN), David Gómez (ESP)
21 July 2023; 16:00	Report	Score by quarters: 7–2, 3–0, 4–2, 8–2			Marine Messe Fukuoka, Fukuoka; Referees: Tamás Kovács-Csatlós (HUN), David Gómez (ESP)
21 July 2023; 16:00	Report	Negus, Poot 4	Goals	Artyukh 2	Marine Messe Fukuoka, Fukuoka; Referees: Tamás Kovács-Csatlós (HUN), David Gómez (ESP)

Playoffs

23 July 2023; 15:30	Report	Australia	8–11	France	Marine Messe Fukuoka, Fukuoka; Referees: Adrian-Tiberiu Alexandrescu (ROU), Darren Spiritsanto (USA)
23 July 2023; 15:30	Report	Score by quarters: 0–4, 5–2, 2–4, 1–1			Marine Messe Fukuoka, Fukuoka; Referees: Adrian-Tiberiu Alexandrescu (ROU), Darren Spiritsanto (USA)
23 July 2023; 15:30	Report	Negus, Pavillard 2	Goals	Vernoux 4	Marine Messe Fukuoka, Fukuoka; Referees: Adrian-Tiberiu Alexandrescu (ROU), Darren Spiritsanto (USA)

9–12th place semifinals

25 July 2023; 13:30	Report	Australia	16–15	Japan	Marine Messe Fukuoka, Fukuoka; Referees: David Gómez (ESP), Darren Spiritsanto (USA)
25 July 2023; 13:30	Report	Score by quarters: 5–3, 4–7, 4–3, 3–2			Marine Messe Fukuoka, Fukuoka; Referees: David Gómez (ESP), Darren Spiritsanto (USA)
25 July 2023; 13:30	Report	Pavillard 4	Goals	Adachi, Takata 4	Marine Messe Fukuoka, Fukuoka; Referees: David Gómez (ESP), Darren Spiritsanto (USA)

Ninth place game

27 July 2023; 10:30	Report	Croatia	17–10	Australia	Marine Messe Fukuoka, Fukuoka; Referees: Georgios Stavridis (GRE), Veselin Mišković (MNE)
27 July 2023; 10:30	Report	Score by quarters: 3–2, 5–4, 6–2, 3–2			Marine Messe Fukuoka, Fukuoka; Referees: Georgios Stavridis (GRE), Veselin Mišković (MNE)
27 July 2023; 10:30	Report	Vukičević 5	Goals	Poot 3	Marine Messe Fukuoka, Fukuoka; Referees: Georgios Stavridis (GRE), Veselin Mišković (MNE)

=== Women's tournament ===
Team roster

The following is the Australian roster.

Head coach: Paul Oberman

- 1 Gabriella Palm GK
- 2 Pascalle Casey FP
- 3 Elle Armit FP
- 4 Bronte Halligan FP
- 5 Bridget Leeson-Smith FP
- 6 Abby Andrews FP
- 7 Charlize Andrews FP
- 8 Amy Ridge FP
- 9 Zoe Arancini FP
- 10 Alice Williams FP
- 11 Matilda Kearns FP
- 12 Tenealle Fasala FP
- 13 Genevieve Longman GK
- Ruby Swadling FP
- Sofie Pontre FP

Group play

Pos	Team	Pld	W	PSW	PSL	L	GF	GA	GD	Pts	Qualification
1	United States	3	3	0	0	0	40	16	+24	9	Quarterfinals
2	Australia	3	2	0	0	1	26	24	+2	6	Playoffs
3	France	3	1	0	0	2	25	37	−12	3	Playoffs
4	China	3	0	0	0	3	24	38	−14	0	

Source: Sportresult
Rules for classification: 1) points; 2) head-to-head points; 3) head-to-head goal difference; 4) head-to-head number of goals scored; 5) Goal difference.

16 July 2023; 10:30	Report	France	8–10	Australia	Marine Messe Fukuoka, Fukuoka; Referees: Hélène Painchaud (CAN), Germán Moller (ARG)
16 July 2023; 10:30	Report	Score by quarters: 3–3, 2–4, 2–1, 1–2			Marine Messe Fukuoka, Fukuoka; Referees: Hélène Painchaud (CAN), Germán Moller (ARG)
16 July 2023; 10:30	Report	Bouloukbachi 3	Goals	Andrews, Fasala 2	Marine Messe Fukuoka, Fukuoka; Referees: Hélène Painchaud (CAN), Germán Moller (ARG)

18 July 2023; 17:30	Report	Australia	5–9	United States	Marine Messe Fukuoka, Fukuoka; Referees: Natalia Markopoulou (GRE), Nóra Debreceni (HUN)
18 July 2023; 17:30	Report	Score by quarters: 3–5, 0–0, 1–3, 1–1			Marine Messe Fukuoka, Fukuoka; Referees: Natalia Markopoulou (GRE), Nóra Debreceni (HUN)
18 July 2023; 17:30	Report	Williams 3	Goals	three players 2	Marine Messe Fukuoka, Fukuoka; Referees: Natalia Markopoulou (GRE), Nóra Debreceni (HUN)

20 July 2023; 13:00	Report	China	7–11	Australia	Marine Messe Fukuoka, Fukuoka; Referees: Raffaele Colombo (ITA), Hélène Painchaud (CAN)
20 July 2023; 13:00	Report	Score by quarters: 1–4, 3–2, 1–3, 2–2			Marine Messe Fukuoka, Fukuoka; Referees: Raffaele Colombo (ITA), Hélène Painchaud (CAN)
20 July 2023; 13:00	Report	Lu, Zhang Jin. 2	Goals	five players 2	Marine Messe Fukuoka, Fukuoka; Referees: Raffaele Colombo (ITA), Hélène Painchaud (CAN)

Playoffs

22 July 2023; 14:00	Report	Australia	16–7	Israel	Marine Messe Fukuoka, Fukuoka; Referees: Marta Cabanas (ESP), Adil Aimbetov (KAZ)
22 July 2023; 14:00	Report	Score by quarters: 7–2, 4–1, 3–1, 2–3			Marine Messe Fukuoka, Fukuoka; Referees: Marta Cabanas (ESP), Adil Aimbetov (KAZ)
22 July 2023; 14:00	Report	Armit 4	Goals	Kordonskaia 3	Marine Messe Fukuoka, Fukuoka; Referees: Marta Cabanas (ESP), Adil Aimbetov (KAZ)

Quarterfinals

24 July 2023; 18:00	Report	Greece	8–9	Australia	Marine Messe Fukuoka, Fukuoka; Referees: Jennifer McCall (USA), Sébastien Dervieux (FRA)
24 July 2023; 18:00	Report	Score by quarters: 4–3, 1–4, 3–2, 0–0			Marine Messe Fukuoka, Fukuoka; Referees: Jennifer McCall (USA), Sébastien Dervieux (FRA)
24 July 2023; 18:00	Report	Xenaki 3	Goals	four players 2	Marine Messe Fukuoka, Fukuoka; Referees: Jennifer McCall (USA), Sébastien Dervieux (FRA)

Semifinals

26 July 2023; 18:30	Report	Australia	10–12	Spain	Marine Messe Fukuoka, Fukuoka; Referees: Georgios Stavridis (GRE), Jennifer McCall (USA)
26 July 2023; 18:30	Report	Score by quarters: 2–5, 4–3, 2–2, 2–2			Marine Messe Fukuoka, Fukuoka; Referees: Georgios Stavridis (GRE), Jennifer McCall (USA)
26 July 2023; 18:30	Report	Kearns 3	Goals	E. Ruiz 4	Marine Messe Fukuoka, Fukuoka; Referees: Georgios Stavridis (GRE), Jennifer McCall (USA)

Third place game

28 July 2023; 13:00	Report	Italy	16–14	Australia	Marine Messe Fukuoka, Fukuoka; Referees: Darren Spiritosanto (USA), Matan Schwartz (ISR)
28 July 2023; 13:00	Report	Score by quarters: 5–4, 5–6, 3–1, 3–3			Marine Messe Fukuoka, Fukuoka; Referees: Darren Spiritosanto (USA), Matan Schwartz (ISR)
28 July 2023; 13:00	Report	Bianconi 6	Goals	Williams 3	Marine Messe Fukuoka, Fukuoka; Referees: Darren Spiritosanto (USA), Matan Schwartz (ISR)
