= Australia at the 2024 World Aquatics Championships =

- Flag of Australia
- World Aquatics code: AUS
- National federation: Swimming Australia
- Website: swimming.org.au

in Doha, Qatar
- Competitors: 78 in 6 sports
- Medals Ranked 3rd: Gold 7 Silver 12 Bronze 5 Total 24

World Aquatics Championships appearances
- 1973; 1975; 1978; 1982; 1986; 1991; 1994; 1998; 2001; 2003; 2005; 2007; 2009; 2011; 2013; 2015; 2017; 2019; 2022; 2023; 2024; 2025

Australia competed at the 2024 World Aquatics Championships in Doha, Qatar from 2 to 18 February.

== Medalists ==
Medal	Name	Sport	Event	Date
1st place, gold medalist(s)	Alysha Koloi	Diving	Women's 1 metre springboard	2 February 2024
1st place, gold medalist(s)	Moesha Johnson; Chelsea Gubecka; Nicholas Sloman; Kyle Lee	Open water swimming	Team Relay	8 February 2024
1st place, gold medalist(s)	Domonic Bedggood; Maddison Keeney	Diving	Mixed synchronized 3 metre springboard	10 February 2024
1st place, gold medalist(s)	Rhiannan Iffland	High diving	Women's high diving	14 February 2024
1st place, gold medalist(s)	Samuel Williamson	Swimming	Men's 50 metre breaststroke	14 February 2024
1st place, gold medalist(s)	Isaac Cooper	Swimming	Men's 50 metre backstroke	18 February 2024
1st place, gold medalist(s)	Iona Anderson Abbey Harkin Brianna Throssell Shayna Jack; Jaclyn Barclay (heat) Alexandria Perkins (heat)	Swimming	Women's 4 × 100 metre medley relay	18 February 2024
2nd place, silver medalist(s)	Li Shixin	Diving	Men's 1 metre springboard	3 February 2024
2nd place, silver medalist(s)	Chelsea Gubecka	Open water swimming	Women's 5 km	7 February 2024
2nd place, silver medalist(s)	Maddison Keeney; Anabelle Smith	Diving	Women's synchronized 3 metre springboard	7 February 2024
2nd place, silver medalist(s)	Elijah Winnington	Swimming	Men's 400 metre freestyle	11 February 2024
2nd place, silver medalist(s)	Brianna Throssell Alexandria Perkins Abbey Harkin Shayna Jack; Jaclyn Barclay (heat)	Swimming	Women's 4 × 100 metre freestyle relay	11 February 2024
2nd place, silver medalist(s)	Iona Anderson	Swimming	Women's 100 metre backstroke	13 February 2024
2nd place, silver medalist(s)	Elijah Winnington	Swimming	Men's 800 metre freestyle	14 February 2024
2nd place, silver medalist(s)	Bradley Woodward Samuel Williamson Brianna Throssell Shayna Jack; Abbey Harkin (heat) Alexandria Perkins (heat)	Swimming	Mixed 4 × 100 metre medley relay	14 February 2024
2nd place, silver medalist(s)	Iona Anderson	Swimming	Women's 50 metre backstroke	15 February 2024
2nd place, silver medalist(s)	Cameron McEvoy	Swimming	Men's 50 metre freestyle	17 February 2024
2nd place, silver medalist(s)	Jaclyn Barclay	Swimming	Women's 200 metre backstroke	17 February 2024
2nd place, silver medalist(s)	Kai Taylor Jack Cartwright Brianna Throssell Shayna Jack; Abbey Harkin (heat); Alexandria Perkins (heat)	Swimming	Mixed 4 × 100 metre freestyle relay	17 February 2024
3rd place, bronze medalist(s)	Cassiel Rousseau; Maddison Keeney; Nikita Hains; Li Shixin	Diving	Team event	2 February 2024
3rd place, bronze medalist(s)	Cameron McEvoy	Swimming	Men's 50 metre butterfly	12 February 2024
3rd place, bronze medalist(s)	Brianna Throssell	Swimming	Women's 200 metre freestyle	14 February 2024
3rd place, bronze medalist(s)	Brianna Throssell Shayna Jack Abbey Harkin Kiah Melverton; Jaclyn Barclay (heat)	Swimming	Women's 4 × 200 metre freestyle relay	15 February 2024
3rd place, bronze medalist(s)	Shayna Jack	Swimming	Women's 100 metre freestyle	16 February 2024

== Athletes by discipline ==
The following is the list of number of competitors participating at the Championships per discipline.

Sport	Men	Women	Total
Artistic swimming	0	10	10
Diving	6	6	12
High diving	1	3	4
Open water swimming	4	4*	8*
Swimming	7	8*	15*
Water polo	15	15	30
Total	33	45	78

- Maddy Gough competed in both open water swimming and pool swimming.

== Artistic swimming ==
Australia's artistic swimming team consisted of ten athletes (all women).

Women

Athlete	Event	Preliminaries		Final	
Athlete	Event	Points	Rank	Points	Rank
Carolyn Buckle; Kiera Gazzard	Duet technical routine	211.1166	19	Did not advance	
Carolyn Buckle; Kiera Gazzard	Duet free routine	161.2521	21	Did not advance	

Mixed

Athlete	Event	Preliminaries		Final	
Athlete	Event	Points	Rank	Points	Rank
Carolyn Buckle; Natalia Caloiero; Georgia Courage-Gardiner; Kiera Gazzard; Margo Joseph-Kuo; Anastasia Kusmawan; Zoe Poulis; Milena Waldman	Team acrobatic routine	172.9033	15	Did not advance	
Carolyn Buckle; Natalia Caloiero; Georgia Courage-Gardiner; Kiera Gazzard; Alessandra Ho; Margo Joseph-Kuo; Zoe Poulis; Milena Waldman	Team free routine	222.7791	10 Q	229.6751	10
Carolyn Buckle; Georgia Courage-Gardiner; Raphaelle Gauthier; Kiera Gazzard; Margo Joseph-Kuo; Anastasia Kusmawan; Zoe Poulis; Milena Waldman	Team technical routine	220.6945	9 Q	224.0447	8

== Diving ==
Australia's diving team consisted of 12 athletes (6 men and 6 women).

Men

Athlete	Event	Preliminaries		Semifinal		Final	
Athlete	Event	Points	Rank	Points	Rank	Points	Rank
Li Shixin	1 m springboard	379.95	3 Q	—		395.70	2nd place, silver medalist(s)
Kurtis Mathews	1 m springboard	367.90	7 Q			372.90	6
Li Shixin	3 m springboard	389.55	8 Q	398.20	7 Q	406.40	10
Kurtis Mathews	3 m springboard	338.55	=32	Did not advance			
Jaxon Bowshire	10 m platform	357.35	21	Did not advance			
Sam Fricker; Kurtis Mathews	3 m synchronized springboard	—				311.61	20
Domonic Bedggood; Cassiel Rousseau	10 m synchronized platform	—				384.15	6

Women

Athlete	Event	Preliminaries		Semifinal		Final	
Athlete	Event	Points	Rank	Points	Rank	Points	Rank
Brittany O'Brien	1 m springboard	194.10	32	Did not advance			
Alysha Koloi	1 m springboard	240.00	6 Q	—		260.50	1st place, gold medalist(s)
Maddison Keeney	3 m springboard	304.45	1 Q	294.80	5 Q	302.95	4
Alysha Koloi	3 m springboard	276.20	9 Q	252.30	14	Did not advance	
Nikita Hains	10 m platform	223.60	35	Did not advance			
Melissa Wu	10 m platform	301.40	8 Q	293.70	8 Q	267.10	12
Maddison Keeney; Anabelle Smith	3 m synchronized springboard	—				300.45	2nd place, silver medalist(s)
Nikita Hains; Melissa Wu	10 m synchronized platform	—				266.58	10

Mixed

Athlete	Event	Final	
Athlete	Event	Points	Rank
Domonic Bedggood; Maddison Keeney	3 m synchronized springboard	300.93	1st place, gold medalist(s)
Cassiel Rousseau; Maddison Keeney; Nikita Hains; Li Shixin	Team event	385.35	3rd place, bronze medalist(s)

== High diving ==
Australia's high diving team consisted of four athletes (one man and three women).

Men

Athlete	Event	Points	Rank
Zach Picton	Men's high diving	262.35	19

Women

Athlete	Event	Points	Rank
Rhiannan Iffland	Women's high diving	342.00	1st place, gold medalist(s)
Emily Chinnock	Women's high diving	Did not finish	
Xantheia Pennisi	Women's high diving	291.95	5

== Open water swimming ==
Australia's open water swimming team consisted of eight athletes (4 men and 4 women).

Men

Athlete	Event	Time	Rank
Bailey Armstrong	Men's 5 km	53:23.5	23
Robert Thorpe	Men's 5 km	51:59.1	16
Kyle Lee	Men's 10 km	1:48:31.2	9
Nicholas Sloman	Men's 10 km	1:48:29.6	5

Women

Athlete	Event	Time	Rank
Bianca Crisp	Women's 5 km	59:06.0	24
Chelsea Gubecka	Women's 5 km	57:35.0	2nd place, silver medalist(s)
Maddy Gough	Women's 10 km	1:57:51.7	18
Moesha Johnson	Women's 10 km	1:57:30.8	4

Mixed

Athlete	Event	Time	Rank
Moesha Johnson; Chelsea Gubecka; Nicholas Sloman; Kyle Lee	Team relay	1:03:28.0	1st place, gold medalist(s)

== Swimming ==
Australia's swimming team consisted of 15 athletes (7 men and 8 women).

Men

Athlete	Event	Heat		Semifinal		Final	
Athlete	Event	Time	Rank	Time	Rank	Time	Rank
Isaac Cooper	50 m freestyle	21.86	7 Q	21.74	7 Q	21.77	5
Cameron McEvoy	50 m freestyle	21.13	1 Q	21.23	1 Q	21.45	2nd place, silver medalist(s)
Jack Cartwright	100 m freestyle	49.01	17	Did not advance			
Kai Taylor	100 m freestyle	48.88	15 Q	48.50	13	Did not advance	
Kai Taylor	200 m freestyle	1:46.81	7 Q	1:46.37	9	Did not advance	
Elijah Winnington	200 m freestyle	1:46.69	6 Q	1:45.90	5 Q	1:46.20	7
Elijah Winnington	400 m freestyle	3:44.37	1 Q	—		3:42.86	2nd place, silver medalist(s)
Elijah Winnington	800 m freestyle	7:47.59	8 Q	—		7:42.95	2nd place, silver medalist(s)
Isaac Cooper	50 m backstroke	24.75	4 Q	24.12 OC	1 Q	24.13	1st place, gold medalist(s)
Bradley Woodward	50 m backstroke	25.41	18	Did not advance			
Bradley Woodward	100 m backstroke	53.76	6 Q	54.20	16	Did not advance	
Bradley Woodward	200 m backstroke	1:58.26	8 Q	1:57.58	11	Did not advance	
Samuel Williamson	50 m breaststroke	26.69	3 Q	26.41 OC	1 Q	26.32 OC	1st place, gold medalist(s)
Samuel Williamson	100 m breaststroke	59.81	=9 Q	59.35	7 Q	59.21	4
Isaac Cooper	50 m butterfly	23.15	3 Q	23.18	=4 Q	23.12	4
Cameron McEvoy	50 m butterfly	23.19	7 Q	23.21	6 Q	23.08	3rd place, bronze medalist(s)
Bradley Woodward; Sam Williamson; Kai Taylor; Jack Cartwright	4 × 100 m medley relay	3:35.55	9	—		Did not advance	

Women

Athlete	Event	Heat		Semifinal		Final	
Athlete	Event	Time	Rank	Time	Rank	Time	Rank
Shayna Jack	50 m freestyle	24.30	3 Q	24.44	4 Q	24.27	4
Shayna Jack	100 m freestyle	53.50	1 Q	53.16	4 Q	52.83	3rd place, bronze medalist(s)
Shayna Jack	200 m freestyle	1:58.40	=11 Q	1:56.80	3 Q	1:57.24	7
Brianna Throssell	200 m freestyle	1:58.29	9 Q	1:57.09	5 Q	1:56.00	3rd place, bronze medalist(s)
Kiah Melverton	400 m freestyle	4:10.61	12	—		Did not advance	
Maddy Gough	800 m freestyle	8:35.25	=8 Q	—		8:36.43	9
Kiah Melverton	800 m freestyle	8:35.22	7 Q	—		8:29.35	7
Maddy Gough	1500 m freestyle	16:14.48	4 Q	—		16:16.85	7
Iona Anderson	50 m backstroke	28.02	4 Q	27.51	1 Q	27.45	2nd place, silver medalist(s)
Jaclyn Barclay	50 m backstroke	28.36	11 Q	28.17	11	Did not advance	
Iona Anderson	100 m backstroke	59.88	3 Q	59.94	4 Q	59.12	2nd place, silver medalist(s)
Jaclyn Barclay	100 m backstroke	1:00.05	4 Q	59.83	3 Q	59.28	4
Jaclyn Barclay	200 m backstroke	2:10.82	2 Q	2:08.85	2 Q	2:07.03	2nd place, silver medalist(s)
Abbey Harkin	100 m breaststroke	1:09.01	25	Did not advance			
Abbey Harkin	200 m breaststroke	2:31.93	22	Did not advance			
Alexandria Perkins	50 m butterfly	25.89	5 Q	25.81	4 Q	25.85	6
Brianna Throssell	50 m butterfly	26.04	9 Q	25.97	8 Q	25.96	8
Alexandria Perkins	100 m butterfly	58.10	6 Q	58.05	8 Q	57.68	6
Brianna Throssell	100 m butterfly	57.78	4 Q	57.22	3 Q	56.97	4
Kiah Melverton	400 m individual medley	4:53.82	19	—		Did not advance	
Brianna Throssell; Alexandria Perkins; Abbey Harkin; Shayna Jack; Jaclyn Barclay (heat)	4 × 100 m freestyle relay	3:38.33	1 Q	—		3:36.93	2nd place, silver medalist(s)
Brianna Throssell; Shayna Jack; Abbey Harkin; Kiah Melverton; Jaclyn Barclay (heat)	4 × 200 m freestyle relay	7:58.19	7 Q	—		7:51.41	3rd place, bronze medalist(s)
Iona Anderson; Abbey Harkin; Brianna Throssell; Shayna Jack; Jaclyn Barclay (heat); Alexandria Perkins (heat)	4 × 100 m medley relay	4:00.09	3 Q	—		3:55.98	1st place, gold medalist(s)

Mixed

Athlete	Event	Heat		Semifinal		Final	
Athlete	Event	Time	Rank	Time	Rank	Time	Rank
Kai Taylor; Jack Cartwright; Shayna Jack; Brianna Throssell; Alexandria Perkins(heat); Abbey Harkin(heat)	4 × 100 m freestyle relay	3:25.30	3 Q	—		3:21.78	2nd place, silver medalist(s)
Bradley Woodward; Samuel Williamson; Brianna Throssell; Shayna Jack; Alexandria Perkins (heat); Abbey Harkin (heat)	4 × 100 m medley relay	3:45.54	2 Q	—		3:43.12	2nd place, silver medalist(s)

== Water polo ==
Summary

Team	Event	Group stage				Playoff	Quarterfinal	Semifinal	Final / BM	
Team	Event	Opposition Score	Opposition Score	Opposition Score	Rank	Opposition Score	Opposition Score	Opposition Score	Opposition Score	Rank
Australia	Men's tournament	Croatia; L 8–13	South Africa; W 29–7	Spain; L 9-15	3 QP	France; L 8–11	—	United States; L 10–16	China; W 17–7	11
Australia	Women's tournament	Singapore; W 32–1	New Zealand; W 13–6	Hungary; L 9–13	2 QP	Great Britain; W 20–8	United States; L 9–10	Canada; W 10–8	Netherlands; L 8-10	6

=== Men's tournament ===
Team roster

The following is the Australian roster.

Head coach: Timothy Hamill

- 1 Nick Porter GK
- 2 Angus Lambie FP
- 3 George Ford FP
- 4 Charlie Negus FP
- 5 Nathan Power FP
- 6 Lachlan Edwards FP
- 7 Luke Pavillard FP
- 8 Matthew Byrnes FP
- 9 Milos Maksimovic FP
- 10 Timothy Putt FP
- 11 Chaz Poot FP
- 12 Blake Edwards FP
- 13 John Hedges GK
- 14 Marcus Berehulak FP
- 15 Samuel Slobodien FP

Group play

Pos	Team	Pld	W	PSW	PSL	L	GF	GA	GD	Pts	Qualification
1	Spain	3	3	0	0	0	46	20	+26	9	Quarterfinals
2	Croatia	3	2	0	0	1	48	24	+24	6	Playoffs
3	Australia	3	1	0	0	2	46	35	+11	3	Playoffs
4	South Africa	3	0	0	0	3	18	79	−61	0	13–16th place semifinals

Source: World Aquatics
Rules for classification: 1) points; 2) head-to-head points; 3) head-to-head goal difference; 4) head-to-head number of goals scored; 5) Goal difference.

5 February 2024; 13:30	Report	Croatia	13–8	Australia	Aspire Dome, Doha; Referees: Michiel Zwart (NED), György Kun (HUN)
5 February 2024; 13:30	Report	Score by quarters: 5–1, 4–2, 2–2, 2–3			Aspire Dome, Doha; Referees: Michiel Zwart (NED), György Kun (HUN)
5 February 2024; 13:30	Report	six players 2	Goals	Berehulak, Pavillard 2	Aspire Dome, Doha; Referees: Michiel Zwart (NED), György Kun (HUN)

7 February 2024; 13:30	Report	Australia	29–7	South Africa	Aspire Dome, Doha; Referees: David Couper (NZL), Cheng Beng Guan (SGP)
7 February 2024; 13:30	Report	Score by quarters: 6–2, 8–1, 7–1, 8–3			Aspire Dome, Doha; Referees: David Couper (NZL), Cheng Beng Guan (SGP)
7 February 2024; 13:30	Report	Edwards 6	Goals	Stone 2	Aspire Dome, Doha; Referees: David Couper (NZL), Cheng Beng Guan (SGP)

9 February 2024; 13:30	Report	Australia	9–15	Spain	Aspire Dome, Doha; Referees: György Kun (HUN), Darren Spiritosanto (USA)
9 February 2024; 13:30	Report	Score by quarters: 2–4, 3–2, 2–4, 2–5			Aspire Dome, Doha; Referees: György Kun (HUN), Darren Spiritosanto (USA)
9 February 2024; 13:30	Report	Mercep 3	Goals	three players 3	Aspire Dome, Doha; Referees: György Kun (HUN), Darren Spiritosanto (USA)

Playoffs

11 February 2024; 16:00	Report	Australia	8–11	France	Aspire Dome, Doha; Referees: Frank Ohme (GER), Andreia Stanojević (SRB)
11 February 2024; 16:00	Report	Score by quarters: 3–2, 3–4, 1–2, 1–3			Aspire Dome, Doha; Referees: Frank Ohme (GER), Andreia Stanojević (SRB)
11 February 2024; 16:00	Report	Maksimović 2	Goals	Bouet 4	Aspire Dome, Doha; Referees: Frank Ohme (GER), Andreia Stanojević (SRB)

9–12th place semifinals

13 February 2024; 13:30	Report	Australia	10–16	United States	Aspire Dome, Doha; Referees: Alessandro Severo (ITA), Stanko Ivanovski (MNE)
13 February 2024; 13:30	Report	Score by quarters: 3–4, 4–5, 1–3, 2–4			Aspire Dome, Doha; Referees: Alessandro Severo (ITA), Stanko Ivanovski (MNE)
13 February 2024; 13:30	Report	Pavillard 6	Goals	Bowen, Woodhead 3	Aspire Dome, Doha; Referees: Alessandro Severo (ITA), Stanko Ivanovski (MNE)

11th place game

15 February 2024; 09:00	Report	China	7–17	Australia	Aspire Dome, Doha; Referees: Andreia Stanojević (SRB), Hélène Painchaud (CAN)
15 February 2024; 09:00	Report	Score by quarters: 2–8, 0–4, 1–4, 4–1			Aspire Dome, Doha; Referees: Andreia Stanojević (SRB), Hélène Painchaud (CAN)
15 February 2024; 09:00	Report	Chen Z. 3	Goals	Maksimović, Mercep 4	Aspire Dome, Doha; Referees: Andreia Stanojević (SRB), Hélène Painchaud (CAN)

=== Women's tournament ===
Team roster

The following is the Australian roster.

Head coach: Rebecca Rippon

- 1 Gabriella Palm GK
- 2 Keesja Gofers FP
- 3 Sienna Hearn FP
- 4 Bronte Halligan FP
- 5 Bridget Leeson-Smith FP
- 6 Abby Andrews FP
- 7 Charlize Andrews FP
- 8 Sofie Pontre FP
- 9 Zoe Arancini FP
- 10 Alice Williams FP
- 11 Matilda Kearns FP
- 12 Tenealle Fasala FP
- 13 Genevieve Longman GK
- 14 Sienna Green FP
- 15 Danijela Jackvoch FP

Group play

Pos	Team	Pld	W	PSW	PSL	L	GF	GA	GD	Pts	Qualification
1	Hungary	3	3	0	0	0	71	19	+52	9	Quarterfinals
2	Australia	3	2	0	0	1	54	20	+34	6	Playoffs
3	New Zealand	3	1	0	0	2	44	36	+8	3	Playoffs
4	Singapore	3	0	0	0	3	7	101	−94	0	13–16th place semifinals

Source: World Aquatics
Rules for classification: 1) points; 2) head-to-head points; 3) head-to-head goal difference; 4) head-to-head number of goals scored; 5) Goal difference.

4 February 2024; 13:30	Report	Australia	32–1	Singapore	Aspire Dome, Doha; Referees: Matan Schwartz (ISR), Lucas Letshabo (RSA)
4 February 2024; 13:30	Report	Score by quarters: 7–1, 13–0, 6–0, 6–0			Aspire Dome, Doha; Referees: Matan Schwartz (ISR), Lucas Letshabo (RSA)
4 February 2024; 13:30	Report	Gofers 5	Goals	Wan 1	Aspire Dome, Doha; Referees: Matan Schwartz (ISR), Lucas Letshabo (RSA)

6 February 2024; 10:30	Report	New Zealand	6–13	Australia	Aspire Dome, Doha; Referees: Matan Schwartz (ISR), Viktor Salnichenko (KAZ)
6 February 2024; 10:30	Report	Score by quarters: 2–3, 2–3, 1–3, 1–4			Aspire Dome, Doha; Referees: Matan Schwartz (ISR), Viktor Salnichenko (KAZ)
6 February 2024; 10:30	Report	Doyle, Houghton 2	Goals	Williams 4	Aspire Dome, Doha; Referees: Matan Schwartz (ISR), Viktor Salnichenko (KAZ)

8 February 2024; 13:30	Report	Hungary	13–9	Australia	Aspire Dome, Doha; Referees: Xavi Buch (ESP), Natalia Markopoulou (GRE)
8 February 2024; 13:30	Report	Score by quarters: 4–2, 4–3, 3–1, 2–3			Aspire Dome, Doha; Referees: Xavi Buch (ESP), Natalia Markopoulou (GRE)
8 February 2024; 13:30	Report	Keszthelyi 5	Goals	Williams 3	Aspire Dome, Doha; Referees: Xavi Buch (ESP), Natalia Markopoulou (GRE)

Playoffs

10 February 2024; 17:30	Report	Australia	20–8	Great Britain	Aspire Dome, Doha; Referees: Natalia Markopoulou (GRE), Yuri Maciel (BRA)
10 February 2024; 17:30	Report	Score by quarters: 6–1, 6–2, 4–1, 4–4			Aspire Dome, Doha; Referees: Natalia Markopoulou (GRE), Yuri Maciel (BRA)
10 February 2024; 17:30	Report	A. Andrews 6	Goals	Cutler, Falvey 2	Aspire Dome, Doha; Referees: Natalia Markopoulou (GRE), Yuri Maciel (BRA)

Quarterfinals

12 February 2024; 16:00	Report	United States	10–9	Australia	Aspire Dome, Doha; Referees: Frank Ohme (GER), David Couper (NZL)
12 February 2024; 16:00	Report	Score by quarters: 2–2, 3–1, 3–0, 2–6			Aspire Dome, Doha; Referees: Frank Ohme (GER), David Couper (NZL)
12 February 2024; 16:00	Report	Musselman 3	Goals	four players 2	Aspire Dome, Doha; Referees: Frank Ohme (GER), David Couper (NZL)

5–8th place semifinals

14 February 2024; 12:00	Report	Australia	10–8	Canada	Aspire Dome, Doha; Referees: Darren Spiritosanto (USA), Sébastien Dervieux (FRA)
14 February 2024; 12:00	Report	Score by quarters: 3–1, 0–2, 2–3, 5–2			Aspire Dome, Doha; Referees: Darren Spiritosanto (USA), Sébastien Dervieux (FRA)
14 February 2024; 12:00	Report	Williams 3	Goals	Wright 3	Aspire Dome, Doha; Referees: Darren Spiritosanto (USA), Sébastien Dervieux (FRA)

Fifth place game

16 February 2024; 16:00	Report	Australia	8–10	Netherlands	Aspire Dome, Doha; Referees: Jennifer McCall (USA), Nóra Debreceni (HUN)
16 February 2024; 16:00	Report	Score by quarters: 1–2, 5–1, 1–3, 1–4			Aspire Dome, Doha; Referees: Jennifer McCall (USA), Nóra Debreceni (HUN)
16 February 2024; 16:00	Report	Kearns 3	Goals	Van de Kraats 3	Aspire Dome, Doha; Referees: Jennifer McCall (USA), Nóra Debreceni (HUN)
