= Open water swimming at the 2023 World Aquatics Championships =

- Host city: Fukuoka, Japan
- Date(s): 15–20 July
- Venue(s): Seaside Momochi Beach Park
- Events: 5

The open water swimming events at the 2023 World Aquatics Championships were held from 15 to 20 July 2023 at the Seaside Momochi Beach Park in Fukuoka, Japan.

== Schedule ==
Five events were held.

All times are local (UTC+9).

Date	Time	Event
15 July 2023	08:00	10 km Women
16 July 2023	08:00	10 km Men
18 July 2023	08:00	5 km Women
18 July 2023	10:00	5 km Men
20 July 2023	08:00	6 km Team Relay

== Medal summary ==
=== Medal table ===
* Host nation (Japan)

Rank	Nation	Gold	Silver	Bronze	Total
1	Germany	4	0	1	5
2	Italy	1	1	1	3
3	Hungary	0	2	0	2
4	Australia	0	1	1	2
5	Netherlands	0	1	0	1
6	Brazil	0	0	1	1
6	United States	0	0	1	1
Totals (7 entries)		5	5	5	15

=== Men ===
Event	Gold		Silver		Bronze	
5 km	Florian Wellbrock; Germany	53:58.0	Gregorio Paltrinieri; Italy	54:02.5	Domenico Acerenza; Italy	54:04.2
10 km	Florian Wellbrock; Germany	1:50:40.3	Kristóf Rasovszky; Hungary	1:50:59.0	Oliver Klemet; Germany	1:51:00.8

=== Women ===
Event	Gold		Silver		Bronze	
5 km	Leonie Beck; Germany	59:31.7	Sharon van Rouwendaal; Netherlands	59:32.7	Ana Marcela Cunha; Brazil	59:33.9
10 km	Leonie Beck; Germany	2:02:34.0	Chelsea Gubecka; Australia	2:02:38.1	Katie Grimes; United States	2:02:42.3

=== Team ===
Event	Gold		Silver		Bronze	
Team	Italy; Barbara Pozzobon; Ginevra Taddeucci; Domenico Acerenza; Gregorio Paltrinieri	1:10:31.2	Hungary; Bettina Fábián; Anna Olasz; Kristóf Rasovszky; Dávid Betlehem	1:10:35.3	Australia; Chelsea Gubecka; Moesha Johnson; Nicholas Sloman; Kyle Lee	1:11:26.7
