= Diving at the 2024 World Aquatics Championships – Team event =

Team event at the 2024 World Aquatics Championships
- Venue: Hamad Aquatic Centre
- Location: Doha, Qatar
- Dates: 2 February
- Competitors: 47 from 12 nations
- Teams: 12
- Winning points: 421.65

Medalists
| gold medal | Tom Daley; Scarlett Mew Jensen; Daniel Goodfellow; Andrea Spendolini-Sirieix | Great Britain |
| silver medal | Gabriela Agúndez; Randal Willars; Jahir Ocampo; Aranza Vázquez | Mexico |
| bronze medal | Cassiel Rousseau; Maddison Keeney; Nikita Hains; Li Shixin | Australia |

The Team event competition at the 2024 World Aquatics Championships was held on 2 February 2024.

== Results ==
The event was started at 15:32.

| Rank | Nation | Divers | Points |
|---|---|---|---|
| 1st place, gold medalist(s) | Great Britain | Tom Daley; Scarlett Mew Jensen; Daniel Goodfellow; Andrea Spendolini-Sirieix | 421.65 |
| 2nd place, silver medalist(s) | Mexico | Gabriela Agúndez; Randal Willars; Jahir Ocampo; Aranza Vázquez | 412.80 |
| 3rd place, bronze medalist(s) | Australia | Cassiel Rousseau; Maddison Keeney; Nikita Hains; Li Shixin | 385.35 |
| 4 | Germany | Moritz Wesemann; Elena Wassen; Lena Hentschel; Timo Barthel | 362.05 |
| 5 | United States | Lyle Yost; Brandon Loschiavo; Katrina Young; Sarah Bacon | 344.75 |
| 6 | Indonesia | Andriyan; Adityo Restu Putra; Gladies Lariesa Garina Haga | 330.60 |
| 7 | North Korea | Jo Jin-mi; Im Yong-myong; Ko Che-won; Kim Hui-yon | 320.85 |
| 8 | Spain | Valeria Antolino; Nicolás García; Carlos Camacho; Rocío Velázquez | 310.55 |
| 9 | New Zealand | Mikali Dawson; Elizabeth Roussel; Nathan Brown; Frazer Tavener | 306.40 |
| 10 | Italy | Eduard Timbretti Gugiu; Chiara Pellacani; Irene Pesce; Matteo Santoro | 271.70 |
| 11 | Malaysia | Kimberly Bong; Bertrand Rhodict Lises; Nur Eilisha Rania Muhammad Abrar Raj; Hanis Jaya Surya | 245.90 |
| 12 | Macau | Zhao Hang U Zhang Hoi; He Heung Wing; Lo Ka Wai | 212.70 |
