= Anthony Hrysanthos =

Australian water polo player

Personal information
- Nationality: Australia
- Born: 28 November 1995 (age 30)

Sport
- Sport: Water polo
- College team: Newington College
- Club: Sydney University Lions

Anthony Hrysanthos (born 28 November 1995) is an Australian water polo player of Greek descent who plays as a goalkeeper for Australia men's national water polo team. He made his debut appearance at the Olympics representing Australia at the 2020 Summer Olympics.

== Biography ==
His grandparents were born in Greece. He was born in Australia and spent most of his life in Australia. Hrysannthos was educated at Newington College completing is Higher School Certificate in 2013. After leaving school he was coach of the Newington 1sts water polo team. He gained Greek citizenship during his stay in Greece when he was signed up to play for Greek club Vouliagmeni in 2018 prior to the start of 2018/19 season.

== Career ==
=== National team ===
He was part of Australian team which finished at eighth position in the 2015 FINA Youth World Championships.

He made his senior international debut for Australia in 2017 and was selected to the national water polo squad to represent Australia at the 2017 World Aquatics Championships. He was part of the Australian team which won silver at the 2018 FINA Men's Water Polo World League. He played a key role in helping Sydney University Lions in winning the 2018 Australian Waterpolo League title whereas he saved three penalties in the final.

Hrysanthos was picked in the water polo Sharks squad to compete in the men's water polo tournament at the 2020 Summer Olympics. Coached by Elvis Fatović, the team finished joint fourth on points in their pool but their inferior goal average meant they finished fifth overall and out of medal contention. They were able to upset Croatia in a group stage match 11–8. Australia at the 2020 Summer Olympics details the results in depth.

=== Club career ===
From 2018 to 2019, Hrysanthos went to Greece to play professionally for NC Vouliagmeni. In the playoff series against Olympiacos CFP, Hrysanthos helped to win through a penalty shootout. For Olympiacos, it was the first loss in a domestic league game in around 150 games.
