= Laura Hingston =

Australian diver

Personal information
- Nationality: Australian
- Born: 11 August 1995 (age 29)

Sport
- Sport: Diving

Laura Hingston (born 11 August 1995) is an Australian diver. She competed in the women's 10 metre platform event at the 2019 World Aquatics Championships.
