= Predrag Mihailović =

Australian water polo coach

Personal information
- Born: February 24, 1974 (age 52)

Sport
- Sport: Water polo

Predrag Mihailović (born 24 February 1974) is an Australian water polo coach. He was the head coach of the Australia women's national water polo team at the 2020 Summer Olympics. His daughter, Lena Mihailovic competed at the 2020 Summer Olympics in the Australian team.
