= Carolyn Rayna Buckle =

Australian synchronised swimmer

Rayna Buckle
Personal information
- Full name: Carolyn Rayna Buckle
- Nationality: Australian
- Born: 29 August 2000 (age 25) Singapore

Sport
- Sport: Swimming
- Strokes: Synchronised swimming
- Club: Sydney Emeralds

Carolyn Rayna Buckle (born 29 August 2000), known as Rayna Buckle, is a Singaporean-born Australian synchronised swimmer. She represented Australia at the 2020 Summer Olympics, where artistic swimming team consisting of Hannah Burkhill, Kiera Gazzard, Alessandra Ho, Kirsten Kinash, Rachel Presser, Emily Rogers, Amie Thompson and Buckle were able to progress to the final, however, they finished ninth. Buckle and Gazzard also competed for Australia at the 2024 Summer Olympics, finishing 16th in the duet and 9th in the team event along with Georgia Courage-Gardiner, Raphaelle Gauthier, Margo Joseph-Kuo, Anastasia Kusmawan, Zoe Poulis and Milena Waldmann.

== Early years ==
Buckle was born on 29 August 2000 in Singapore to a Singaporean mother and an Australian father. At the age of 15, she competed at the 2015 FINA World Championships. Buckle was part of Singapore's squad in the Team event who finished in the top-20 (19th). At the 2019 FINA World Championships in South Korea. Buckle achieved two top-20 results, placed 20th in the Team Free and 19th in the Team Technical competitions. At FINA's World Series event in April 2019 held in Japan, Buckle was part of Team Singapore that finished 5th in the Team Technical and 6th in the Team Free competitions.

Buckle moved to Australia in 2020 to study for her Bachelor of Applied Science (Physiotherapy) at the University of Sydney, after completing her studies at the Methodist Girls School in Singapore. She is currently a member of the Sydney Emeralds artistic swimming team, who train at Cook and Phillip Pool at Hyde Park.
