= Emily Rogers =

Australian synchronised swimmer

Personal information
- Born: 25 March 1998 (age 28) Auchenflower, Queensland, Australia
- Education: The University of Notre Dame Australia

Sport
- Sport: Swimming
- Strokes: Synchronised swimming

Emily Rogers (born 25 March 1998) is an Australian synchronised (artistic) swimmer. Artistic Swimming made its Olympic debut in 1984 (named Synchronised Swimming) and is one of only two events that is female only at the Olympics. Teams perform a 3-minute technical routine of five technical elements and a 4-minute free routine that emphasises creativity and choreography.

Rogers competed in the team event at the 2016 Summer Olympics. She qualified to represent Australia at the 2020 Summer Olympics. The artistic swimming duet of Rogers and Amie Thompson failed to qualify for the final and finished 20th in the preliminary rounds. The full team consisting of Carolyn Rayna Buckle, Hannah Burkhill, Kiera Gazzard, Alessandra Ho, Kirsten Kinash, Rachel Presser, Amie Thompson and Rogers were able to progress to the final, however, they finished ninth.

== Early years ==
Rogers discovered the sport of Artistic Swimming whilst watching 2010 Commonwealth Games on television. Artistic swimming combined her passion for both dancing and swimming.

Rogers moved from Queensland to Victoria and joined the Golden Fish Synchronised Swimming Club in Footscray, Victoria as a junior. At the club she was able to build her skills and confidence in the sport. Rogers qualified for the National squad only two years after starting the sport, and in 2015 she qualified for her debut Olympic Games at the FINA World Championships in Kazan, Russia in 2015.
