= Amie Thompson =

Australian synchronised swimmer

Personal information
- Nationality: Australian
- Born: 31 January 1996 (age 30) London, England

Sport
- Sport: Swimming
- Strokes: Synchronised swimming

Amie Thompson (born 31 January 1996) is an Australian synchronised (artistic) swimmer. Artistic Swimming made its Olympic debut in 1984 (named Synchronised Swimming) and is one of only two events that is female only at the Olympics. Teams perform a 3-minute technical routine of five technical elements and a 4-minute free routine that emphasises creativity and choreography.

Thompson competed in the team event at the 2016 Summer Olympics. She qualified to represent Australia at the 2020 Summer Olympics. The artistic swimming duet of Emily Rogers and Thompson failed to qualify for the final and finished 20th in the preliminary rounds. The full team consisting of Carolyn Rayna Buckle, Hannah Burkhill, Kiera Gazzard, Alessandra Ho, Kirsten Kinash, Rachel Presser, Emily Rogers and Thompson were able to progress to the final, however, they finished ninth.

== Early years ==
Thompson began as a lap swimmer and gymnast. In 2008, as a 12-year old her school swim teacher advised her to take up Artistic Swimming. When only 15-years-old she was selected as a reserve for the 2011 FINA World Championships Team. When she finished high school, Thompson moved from Sydney to Perth to pursue her Olympic dream. Thompson was part of the 2015 World Championships Australian team that qualified for Rio 2016 Olympics by beating New Zealand.
