= Hannah Cross (synchronised swimmer) =

Australian synchronised swimmer

Personal information
- Born: 27 January 1997 (age 29) Melbourne

Sport
- Country: Australia
- Sport: Synchronized swimming

Hannah Cross (born 27 January 1997) is an Australian synchronised swimmer. She competed in the women's team event at the 2016 Summer Olympics. She has qualified to represent Australia at the 2020 Summer Olympics.
