= Hannah Burkhill =

Australian synchronised swimmer

Personal information
- Born: 22 July 2000 (age 25)
- Height: 165 cm (5 ft 5 in)

Sport
- Sport: Swimming
- Strokes: Synchronised swimming

Hannah Burkhill (born 22 July 2000) is an Australian synchronised (artistic) swimmer.

Burkhill represented Australia at the 2020 Summer Olympics. The artistic swimming team consisting of Kiera Gazzard, Alessandra Ho, Kirsten Kinash, Rachel Presser, Emily Rogers, Amie Thompson, Carolyn Rayna Buckle and Burkhill were able to progress to the final, however, they finished ninth.

== Early years ==
Born in Brunei to English parents Burkhill grew up in Western Australia. She excelled in Artistic Swimming and was a member of the SupaNova Synchronised Swimming Club in Booragoon.

In 2016, Burkhill qualified for the Australian Junior Synchronised Swimming Team and represented Australia in the 2016 Junior World Championships, held in Kazan, Russia. The team achieve a 17th placing in the Women's Team competition and 13th in the Women's Free Combination competition. She was named to the Australian Team in and helped Australia secure Olympic qualification in the Women's Free competition at the 2019 FINA World Championships. in Korea.
