= Lea Yanitsas =

Australian water polo player

Personal information
- Born: Lea Terese Barta; 15 March 1989 (age 37) Sydney, Australia
- Height: 172 cm (5 ft 8 in)
- Weight: 78 kg (172 lb)

Sport
- Sport: Water polo
Medal record
World Championships
Silver medal – second place	2013 Barcelona	Team competition
Bronze medal – third place	2019 Gwangju	Team competition

Lea Yanitsas (née Barta;born 15 March 1989) is an Australian water polo player who plays the position of goalkeeper. She was part of the Australian team at the 2015, 2017 and 2019 World Aquatics Championships.

Yanitsas was a member of the Australian Stingrays squad that competed at the 2016 and Tokyo 2020 Olympics.

== Career ==
Yanitsas made her senior debut in 2007. She won a silver medal in 2010 World Cup in Christchurch and competed in the World Championships at Barcelona in 2013, and Kazan in 2015. She was co Captain of Sydney Uni who were National League Champions in 2016.

Yanitsas played in both the 2016 Rio Olympics and the postponed 2020 Tokyo Olympics.

In the 2020 Olympics, the Aussie Stingers went through to the quarterfinals. They were beaten 8-9 by Russia and therefore did not compete for an Olympic medal.

Lea played for UNSW and Sydney Uni in the Australian Water Polo League, winning 3 consecutive years from 2016-2018

== Personal life ==
Yanitsas grew up on Sydney's Northern Beaches. Yanitsas is the daughter of a New Zealand-born mother and Czech father. She is married to Andrew Yanitsas who she met through water polo and they have 3 children.

== See also ==
- Australia women's Olympic water polo team records and statistics
- List of women's Olympic water polo tournament goalkeepers
- List of World Aquatics Championships medalists in water polo
