= Rachel Presser =

Australian synchronised swimmer

Personal information
- Born: 14 January 2000 (age 26) New South Wales

Sport
- Sport: Swimming
- Strokes: Synchronised swimming

Rachel Presser (born 14 January 2000) is an Australian synchronised swimmer. Artistic Swimming made its Olympic debut in 1984 (named Synchronised Swimming) and is one of only two events that is female only at the Olympics. Teams perform a 3-minute technical routine of five technical elements and a 4-minute free routine that emphasises creativity and choreography.

Rachel represented Australia at the 2020 Summer Olympics. The artistic swimming team consisting of Emily Rogers, Amie Thompson, Carolyn Rayna Buckle, Hannah Burkhill, Kiera Gazzard, Alessandra Ho, Kirsten Kinash and Presser were able to progress to the final, however, they finished ninth.

== Early years ==
Presser grew up on the far North Coast of NSW. She was an extremely active child and participated in many sports including dancing, gymnastics and swimming. When she was nine years old she began artistic swimming after her mother found an advertisement for the local club in the newspaper. She found she was a natural artistic swimmer as she combined her water awareness, flexibility and dancing abilities.

Presser became a member of the Gold Coast Mermaids Synchronised Swimming Club. While completing her Higher School Certificate, she also competed in her first senior competition representing Australia at the 2017 FINA World Championships in Budapest. She competed as the team flyer, who is thrown into the air to perform specific acrobatic skills.

She competed at both the 2017 FINA World Championships and 2019 FINA World Championships.
