= Kevin Chávez =

Mexican diver

Personal information
- Full name: Kevin Alejandro Chávez Banda
- Citizenship: Australia
- Born: 9 July 1991 (age 35) Mexico City, Mexico
Medal record
Men's diving
Representing Mexico
World Championships
Bronze medal – third place	2013 Barcelona	1 m springboard

Kevin Alejandro Chávez Banda (born 9 July 1991 in Mexico City) is a Mexican-born Australian diver who won the bronze medal at the 2013 World Aquatics Championships in Barcelona at the 1 m Springboard event. Chavez competed for Australia at the 2016 Rio Olympics.
