= Nikita Hains =

Australian diver (born 2000)

Personal information
- Nationality: Australian
- Born: 2 November 2000 (age 25) Perth, Australia

Sport
- Sport: Diving
- Event: 10 metre springboard
Medal record
Women's diving
Representing Australia
World Championships
Bronze medal – third place	2024 Doha	Team event

Nikita Hains (born 2 November 2000) is an Australian diver who competes in the 10m individual events, as well as the 10m synchronised.

== Early life ==
Hains was born in Perth, Western Australia. She started out as a gymnast in her hometown of Perth at age 3. She transitioned from gymnastics into the sport of diving at age 13 and made her international debut just two years later.

Hains previously trained as a member of the Western Australian Institute of Sport. She was nominated for WAIS Junior Athlete of the Year in 2016, which was won by Tamsin Cook.

Early success prompted her to move to Adelaide to train at the National Training Centre in 2019 under coach Rick Schavone where she joined the South Australian Sports Institute. She was awarded a Tier 2 Scholarship within the 2022 Sport Australia Hall of Fame Scholarship and Mentoring Program. She is currently enrolled at the University of Adelaide pursuing a Bachelor of Biomedical Science degree.

== Career ==
Hains focusses primarily on the 10m platform individual and synchronised disciplines. She has won more than 10 international medals between 2016 and 2020, as well as national titles in 2018, 2020, 2021 and 2022.

Hains, first senior international competition was in 2016 where she competed at the 2016 FINA Diving Grand Prix 2016, Leg 8 in Singapore. She won bronze in the women's 10 metre platform behind Japan's Nana Sasaki and Matsuri Arai. In the women's 10m synchronised session, she won silver alongside Tamara Irvine.

In August 2018, despite qualifying for the 2018 Summer Youth Olympics slated for November, Hains withdrew from the competition to focus on her Western Australian Certificate of Education exams.

In November 2019, Hains placed third and earned a bronze medal in the 2019 FINA Diving Grand Prix 2019 - Leg 7 in Gold Coast, Australia. In December 2019, during the 2019 Oceania Championships, New Zealand, she won gold in the 10m individual platform. She dominated the competition with a score of 286.1 points n the preliminary round before producing 270.7 points in the final to take the title ahead of New Zealand duo Mikali Dawson and Alyssa Bond.

With the gold medal she earned Australia an Olympic quota in the women's 10m platform at the Tokyo Olympic Games.

In July 2019, Hains competed at the 30th Summer Universiade in Naples, Italy.

Due to COVID-19 the Australian team withdrew from the qualification event for Tokyo Olympics games and therefore could not qualify for any synchronised event, which prevented Nikita from competing in the 10m platform synchronised event.

Hains won silver in the individual platform and bronze in the 10m platform synchronised event at the 2020 FINA Diving Grand Prix, Madrid Spain. The results propelled for the Aussies Olympic Trial where a personal best earned her selection for the Tokyo Olympic Games. At Tokyo Olympics she placed 21st in the 10m Platform.

In June 2022, Hains won gold in the 10m women's platform and silver in 10m platform synchronised in the Australian Diving Championships to secure a spot at the 2022 FINA World Championships and 2022 Commonwealth Games, her debut games. The following week, Hains won bronze in the women's 10m synchronized at the FINA Diving Grand Prix in Calgary, Canada competing along with Emily Boyd.

== Personal life ==
Hains aspires to become a doctor after completing her Bachelor of Biomedical Science at the University of Adelaide.
