= Lena Mihailovic =

Australian water polo player

Personal information
- Nationality: Australian
- Born: 10 August 1996 (age 28); Belgrade
- Height: 168 cm (5 ft 6 in)

Sport
- Sport: Water polo
- Team: Australia women's national water polo team; Cronulla Sharks Water Polo Club

Lena Mihailovic (born 10 August 1996) is an Australian female water polo Olympian.

== Early life ==
Mihailovic was born in Belgrade, Serbia in 1996. Her father was a professional water polo player until 2005 and she lived in many different parts of the world including Montenegro, Italy and Turkey.

== Achievements ==
Mihailovic was a member of the Australian Stingrays squad that competed at the Tokyo 2020 Olympics. The Head Coach was her father Predrag Mihailović. By finishing second in their pool, the Aussie Stingers went through to the quarterfinals. They were beaten 8-9 by Russia and therefore did not compete for an Olympic medal.
