= Clyde Lewis =

Australian swimmer

Personal information
- Nickname: McQueen
- National team: Australia
- Born: 25 September 1997 (age 28) Herston, Queensland
- Height: 1.95 m (6 ft 5 in)
- Weight: 86 kg (190 lb)

Sport
- Sport: Swimming
- Strokes: Freestyle; Medley
- Club: Cali Condors; Griffith University
- Coach: Michael Bohl
Medal record
Men's swimming
Representing Australia
World Championships (LC)
Gold medal – first place	2019 Gwangju	4×200 m freestyle
Silver medal – second place	2019 Gwangju	4×100 m mixed freestyle
Bronze medal – third place	2019 Gwangju	4×100 m freestyle
World Championships (SC)
Silver medal – second place	2022 Melbourne	4×200 m freestyle
Bronze medal – third place	2016 Windsor	4×200 m freestyle
Pan Pacific Championships
Silver medal – second place	2018 Tokyo	4×200 m freestyle
Commonwealth Games
Gold medal – first place	2018 Gold Coast	400 m medley
Bronze medal – third place	2018 Gold Coast	200 m medley
World Junior Championships
Gold medal – first place	2015 Singapore	200 m medley
Silver medal – second place	2015 Singapore	4×200 m freestyle
Commonwealth Youth Games
Gold medal – first place	2015 Samoa	200 m freestyle
Gold medal – first place	2015 Samoa	400 m medley
Gold medal – first place	2015 Samoa	200 m medley
Gold medal – first place	2015 Samoa	4×100 m freestyle
Gold medal – first place	2015 Samoa	4×200 m freestyle
Silver medal – second place	2015 Samoa	100 m backstroke
Silver medal – second place	2015 Samoa	4×100 m medley
Bronze medal – third place	2015 Samoa	50 m backstroke

Clyde Lewis (born 25 September 1997) is an Australian competitive swimmer. Lewis won the gold medal in the 400 metre individual medley at the 2018 Commonwealth Games. He also won the gold medal in the 200 metre individual medley at the 2015 FINA World Junior Swimming Championships. He also won a silver medal in the 4 × 200 m freestyle, swimming the second leg. Lewis competed at the 2015 Commonwealth Youth Games where he brought back a total of 8 medals, 5 of them being gold. There, he also set a personal best time in the 50 metre backstroke and the 400 m individual medley.
