= Matthew Carter (diver) =

Australian diver

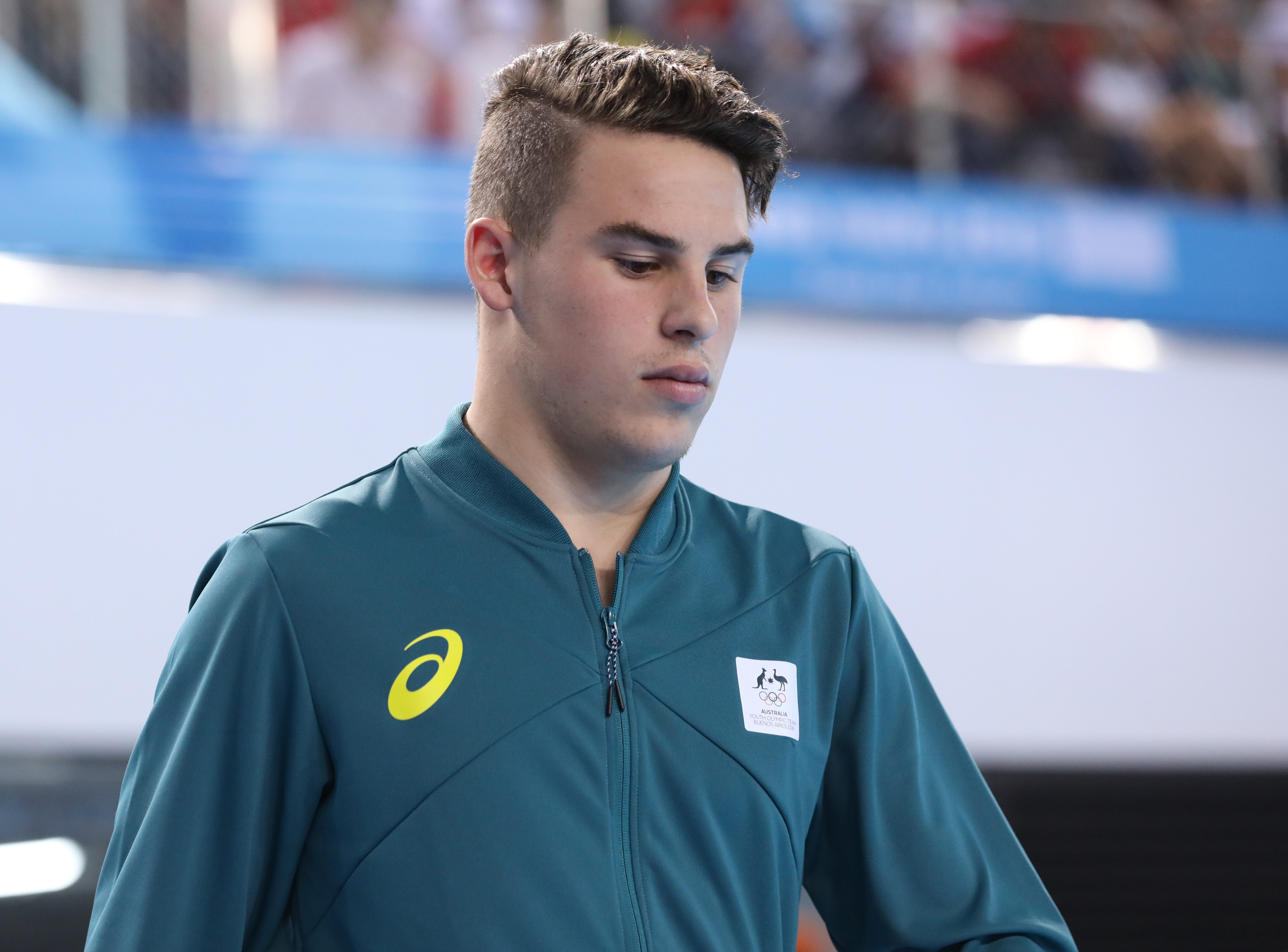

Personal information
- Nationality: Australian
- Born: 11 September 2000 (age 25) Adelaide, Australia
- Height: 1.78 m (5 ft 10 in)

Sport
- Country: Australia
- Sport: Diving
- Event: 3 m synchro
Medal record
World Championships
Gold medal – first place	2019 Gwangju	3 m mixed synchro
Commonwealth Games
Bronze medal – third place	2018 Gold Coast	3 m synchro

Matthew Carter (born 11 September 2000) is an Australian diver. He participated at the 2019 World Aquatics Championships, winning a medal.
