= Kirsten Kinash =

Australian synchronised swimmer

Personal information
- Nationality: Australian
- Born: 30 May 1998 (age 28) Calgary, Alberta, Canada

Sport
- Sport: Swimming
- Strokes: Synchronised swimming

Kirsten Kinash (born 30 May 1998) is an Australian synchronised (artistic) swimmer. Artistic Swimming made its Olympic debut in 1984 (named Synchronised Swimming) and is one of only two events that is female only at the Olympics. Teams perform a 3-minute technical routine of five technical elements and a 4-minute free routine that emphasises creativity and choreography.

Kinash represented Australia at the 2020 Summer Olympics. The artistic swimming team consisting of Rachel Presser, Emily Rogers, Amie Thompson, Carolyn Rayna Buckle, Hannah Burkhill, Kiera Gazzard, Alessandra Ho and Kinash were able to progress to the final, however, they finished ninth.

== Early years ==
Kinash grew up in Canada and was a good swimmer. However, she found that speed swimming up and down between the lanes was monotonous. When she was 7-years-old she joined a local Artistic Swimming Club and loved the sport. In 2008 her family moved to Australia and Kinash joined the Gold Coast Mermaids in Queensland.

In 2017 Kinash was selected as a reserve in the team that competed at the World Swimming Championships in Budapest, She then competed at the 2019 FINA World Championships in Gwanju, South Korea.
