= Georgia Courage-Gardiner =

Australian synchronised swimmer

Personal information
- Nationality: Australian
- Born: 17 March 2003 (age 23) South Brisbane

Sport
- Sport: Swimming
- Strokes: Synchronised swimming

Georgia Courage-Gardiner (born 17 March 2003 in South Brisbane) is an Australian synchronised swimmer. She represented Australia at the 2024 Summer Olympics in Artistic Swimming. She grew up on the Gold Coast and attended Aquinas College throughout her schooling years.
