= Amy Ridge =

Australian water polo player

Personal information
- Nationality: Australian
- Born: 15 August 1996 (age 29) Sydney

Sport
- Sport: Water polo
- Team: Australia women's national water polo team; University of New South Wales; University of Michigan

Amy Ridge (born 15 August 1996) is an Australian water polo player who is a member of the Australia women's national water polo team. She was part of the team at the 2017 World Aquatics Championships, 2018 FINA World Cup, 2019 World Aquatics Championships, and 2019 FINA Women's Water Polo World League.

She played for University of New South Wales's water polo team, and University of Michigan's women's water polo team.

Ridge was a member of the Australian Stingers squad that competed at the Tokyo 2020 Olympics. By finishing second in their pool, the Aussie Stingers went through to the quarterfinals. They were beaten 8-9 by Russia and therefore did not compete for an Olympic medal.
