= Alessandra Ho =

Australian synchronised swimmer

Personal information
- Born: 27 February 2000 (age 26)

Sport
- Sport: Swimming
- Strokes: Synchronised swimming

Alessandra Ho (born 27 February 2000) is an Australian synchronised (artistic) swimmer. Artistic Swimming made its Olympic debut in 1984 (named Synchronised Swimming) and is one of only two events that is female only at the Olympics. Teams perform a 3 minute technical routine of five technical elements and a 4 minute free routine that emphasises creativity and choreography.

Ho represented Australia at the 2020 Summer Olympics. The artistic swimming team consisting of Kirsten Kinash, Rachel Presser, Emily Rogers, Amie Thompson, Carolyn Rayna Buckle, Hannah Burkhill, Kiera Gazzard and Ho were able to progress to the final, however, they finished ninth.

== Early years ==
Ho did not know much about synchronised swimming however her mum, a marathon runner, convinced her to give it a go. In 2011, Ho became a member of the Western Australian West Coast Splash Synchronised Swimming Club. In 2015 she moved to the SupaNova Synchronised Swimming Club.

Ho finished school in 2017 and took up a Bachelor of Nursing at The University of Notre Dame. She still continued with her career in Artistic Swimming.

Ho competed at the 2019 FINA World Championships. in Gwanju, South Korea, where she helped her team to qualify for the 2020 Olympic Games.
