= Maddy Gough =

Australian swimmer (born 1999)

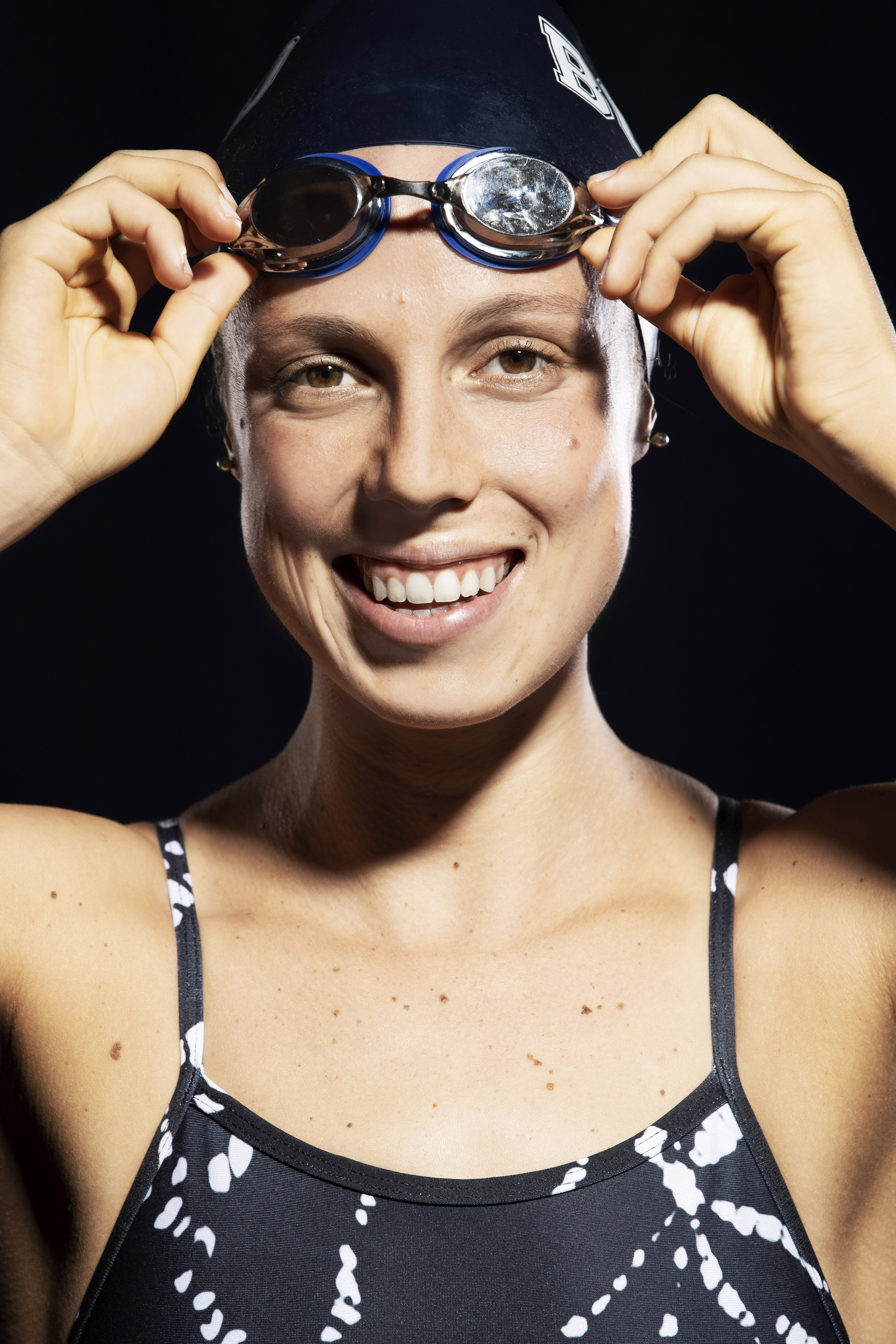
- Gough in 2020

Personal information
- Full name: Madeleine Gough
- National team: Australia
- Born: 8 June 1999 (age 27) Coffs Harbour, New South Wales, Australia

Sport
- Sport: Swimming
- Strokes: Freestyle

Madeleine Gough (born 8 June 1999) is an Australian competitive swimmer. She began her junior swimming as a 7 year old swimming for Sawtell Swimming Club before moving to TSS Aquatic when she was 16. She then moved to Carlisle Swimming Club in 2023.

She competed in the women's 1500 metre freestyle at the 2019 World Aquatics Championships held in Gwangju, South Korea. She finished in fifth place in the final. In 2020 she set the Australian short course record for the women's 1500 metre freestyle at the McDonald's Championship and then in 2021 she broke the long course record at the Hancock Prospecting Olympic swimming trials.

In 2021, she made her Olympic debut at the Tokyo games. She qualified for the final of the women's 1500m freestyle event where she swam outside her best time and finished in 8th place in the race. In 2024 she competed at the World Aquatics Championship in Doha in the 10 km open water swim and the 800m & 1500m freestyle where she finished 9th and 7th respectively.
