= Timothy Putt =

Australian water polo player

Personal information
- Full name: Timothy Francis Putt
- Nationality: Australia
- Born: 6 November 1998 (age 26)

Sport
- Sport: Water polo

Timothy Francis Putt (born 6 November 1998) is an Australian water polo player.

Putt was picked in the water polo Sharks squad to compete in the men's water polo tournament at the 2020 Summer Olympics. The team finished joint fourth on points in their pool but their inferior goal average meant they finished fifth overall and out of medal contention. They were able to upset Croatia in a group stage match 11–8.
