= Nathan Power =

Australian water polo player

Personal information
- Born: 13 February 1993 (age 32); New Lambton, New South Wales, Australia
- Home town: Newcastle, New South Wales, Australia
- Height: 200 cm (6 ft 7 in)

Sport
- Country: Australia
- Sport: Water polo
- Club: UNSW Wests Magpies

Nathan Power (born 13 February 1993) is an Australian water polo player.

Power was picked in the water polo Sharks squad to compete in the men's water polo tournament at the 2020 Summer Olympics. The team finished joint fourth on points in their pool but their inferior goal average meant they finished fifth overall and out of medal contention. They were able to upset Croatia in a group stage match 11–8.

He also competed at the 2024 Summer Olympics as a member of the Australian men's water polo team which finished in 8th place.

== Early life ==
Power was born 13 February 1993 and raised in Newcastle, New South Wales. He attended Merewether High School. Power graduated from the University of New South Wales in 2020, completing a Bachelor of Economics.
