= George Ford (water polo) =

Australian water polo player

Personal information
- Born: 24 February 1993 (age 33) Subiaco, Western Australia, Australia
- Height: 192 cm (6 ft 4 in)
- Weight: 95 kg (209 lb)

Sport
- Sport: water polo
- Updated on 19 August 2015

George Ford (born 24 February 1993) is a water polo player from Australia. He was part of the Australian team at the 2015 World Aquatics Championships, as well as part of the team attending the 2016 Olympics in Rio de Janeiro.

Ford was picked in the water polo Sharks squad to compete in the men's water polo tournament at the 2020 Summer Olympics. The team finished joint fourth on points in their pool but their inferior goal average meant they finished fifth overall and out of medal contention. They were able to upset Croatia in a group stage match 11–8.
