= Kiera Gazzard =

Australian synchronised swimmer

Personal information
- Nationality: Australian
- Born: 5 November 2001 (age 24) New South Wales
- Height: 182 cm (6 ft 0 in)

Sport
- Sport: Swimming
- Strokes: Synchronised swimming
- Club: Gold Coast Mermaids

Kiera Gazzard (born 5 November 2001) is an Australian synchronised (artistic) swimmer. Artistic Swimming made its Olympic debut in 1984 (named Synchronised Swimming) and is one of only two events that is female only at the Olympics. Teams perform a 3-minute technical routine of five technical elements and a 4-minute free routine that emphasises creativity and choreography.

Gazzard represented Australia at the 2020 Summer Olympics. The artistic swimming team consisting of Alessandra Ho, Kirsten Kinash, Rachel Presser, Emily Rogers, Amie Thompson, Carolyn Rayna Buckle, Hannah Burkhill and Gazzard were able to progress to the final, however, they finished ninth.

== Early years ==
Gazzard was a keen swimmer from a very young age. When she was 8-years-old she watched the Artistic Swimming team training at her local pool. She decided to attend a ‘come and try' lesson and was recruited for the 12-and-under team. She trained at the Sydney Emerald Synchronised Swimming Club. Keira then moved to Queensland and trains at The Gold Coast Mermaids Club.

In 2017, Gazzard competed at the FINA World Championships as a member of the Australian team. Australia beat Egypt for the first time in six years. Gazzard set herself a goal to become the first Australian soloist to compete at the Junior World Championships and in 2018 she was selected to swim solo at the FINA World Junior Championships. As well as the Solo swim, she competed in the Duet and Team events. Gazzard suffered a major setback leading into the 2019 FINA World Championships when she was diagnosed with concussion when kicked in the head during a training session. This did not deter her and she continued training for the 2020 Olympics.
