= Lachlan Edwards (water polo) =

Australian water polo player

Personal information
- Full name: Lachlan Robert Edwards
- Born: 6 February 1995 (age 30); East Melbourne, Victoria, Australia
- Home town: Melbourne, Victoria, Australia
- Height: 196 cm (6 ft 5 in)

Sport
- Country: Australia
- Sport: Water polo
- Club: Drummoyne Devils

Lachlan Robert Edwards (born 6 February 1995) is an Australian water polo player.

Edwards was picked in the water polo Sharks squad to compete in the men's water polo tournament at the 2020 Summer Olympics. The team finished joint fourth on points in their pool but their inferior goal average meant they finished fifth overall and out of medal contention. They were able to upset Croatia in a group stage match 11–8.

He also competed at the 2024 Summer Olympics as a member of the Australian men's water polo team which finished in 8th place.
