= Chelsea Gubecka =

Australian swimmer (born 1998)

Personal information
- Full name: Chelsea Lea Gubecka
- Nationality: Australian
- Born: 8 September 1998 (age 28) Nambour, Queensland, Australia
- Height: 1.62 m (5 ft 4 in)
- Weight: 62 kg (137 lb)

Sport
- Sport: Swimming
- Club: Kawana Waters Swimming Club
Medal record
Women's swimming
Representing Australia
World Championships
Gold medal – first place	2024 Doha	Team open water
Silver medal – second place	2023 Fukuoka	10 km open water
Silver medal – second place	2024 Doha	5 km open water
Bronze medal – third place	2023 Fukuoka	Team open water
Pan Pacific Championships
Silver medal – second place	2014 Gold Coast	10 km open water

Chelsea Lea Douyere (née Gubecka; born 8 September 1998) is an Australian swimmer. In 2023, she finished in second, claiming the silver in the 10km Women’s World Championship open water, also alongside Australian teammates clinched the bronze in the 4x1500 open water mixed event in Fukuoka. She competed in the women's marathon 10 kilometre event at the 2016 Summer Olympics. In 2018, she finished in 7th place in the women's 10 kilometre open water at the 2018 Pan Pacific Swimming Championships in Tokyo, Japan.
