= Open water swimming at the 2024 World Aquatics Championships – Women's 5 km =

Women's 5 km at the 2024 World Aquatics Championships
- Venue: Old Doha Port
- Location: Doha, Qatar
- Dates: 7 February
- Competitors: 62 from 38 nations
- Winning time: 57:33.9

Medalists
| gold medal | Sharon van Rouwendaal | Netherlands |
| silver medal | Chelsea Gubecka | Australia |
| bronze medal | Ana Marcela Cunha | Brazil |

The Women's 5 km competition at the 2024 World Aquatics Championships was held on 7 February 2024.

== Results ==
The race was held at 10:30.

| Rank | Swimmer | Nationality | Time |
|---|---|---|---|
| 1st place, gold medalist(s) | Sharon van Rouwendaal | Netherlands | 57:33.9 |
| 2nd place, silver medalist(s) | Chelsea Gubecka | Australia | 57:35.0 |
| 3rd place, bronze medalist(s) | Ana Marcela Cunha | Brazil | 57:36.8 |
| 4 | Katie Grimes | United States | 57:38.4 |
| 5 | Océane Cassignol | France | 57:38.9 |
| 6 | María de Valdés | Spain | 57:39.5 |
| 7 | Giulia Gabbrielleschi | Italy | 57:47.6 |
| 8 | Caroline Jouisse | France | 57:51.5 |
| 9 | Viviane Jungblut | Brazil | 57:52.9 |
| 10 | Angélica André | Portugal | 57:54.1 |
| 11 | Lisa Pou | Monaco | 57:54.5 |
| 12 | Mariah Denigan | United States | 57:55.3 |
| 13 | Mafalda Rosa | Portugal | 57:55.4 |
| 14 | Leonie Beck | Germany | 57:56.6 |
| 15 | Barbara Pozzobon | Italy | 57:58.5 |
| 16 | Jeannette Spiwoks | Germany | 58:03.3 |
| 17 | Candela Sánchez | Spain | 58:03.4 |
| 18 | Xin Xin | China | 58:07.2 |
| 19 | Mao Yihan | China | 58:57.5 |
| 20 | Mira Szimcsák | Hungary | 59:00.6 |
| 21 | Martha Sandoval | Mexico | 59:03.6 |
| 22 | Amica de Jager | South Africa | 59:04.0 |
| 23 | Emma Finlin | Canada | 59:04.4 |
| 24 | Bianca Crisp | Australia | 59:06.0 |
| 25 | Tory Earle | South Africa | 59:06.3 |
| 26 | Tuna Erdoğan | Turkey | 59:07.8 |
| 27 | Alena Benešová | Czech Republic | 59:07.8 |
| 28 | Špela Perše | Slovenia | 59:10.4 |
| 29 | Samantha Arévalo | Ecuador | 59:10.5 |
| 30 | María Bramont-Arias | Peru | 59:10.8 |
| 31 | Lenka Pavlacká | Czech Republic | 59:14.3 |
| 32 | Paola Pérez | Venezuela | 59:14.9 |
| 33 | Anna Olasz | Hungary | 59:15.0 |
| 34 | Lee Hae-rim | South Korea | 59:16.9 |
| 35 | Nip Tsz Yin | Hong Kong | 59:18.7 |
| 36 | Georgia Makri | Greece | 59:21.3 |
| 37 | Ana Abad | Ecuador | 59:21.9 |
| 38 | Laila Oravsky | Canada | 59:22.4 |
| 39 | Park Jung-ju | South Korea | 1:01:18.0 |
| 40 | Katja Fain | Slovenia | 1:01:20.4 |
| 41 | Diana Taszhanova | Kazakhstan | 1:01:20.7 |
| 42 | Teng Yu-wen | Chinese Taipei | 1:01:22.9 |
| 43 | Nikita Lam | Hong Kong | 1:01:25.0 |
| 44 | Yanci Vanegas | Guatemala | 1:04:47.7 |
| 45 | Fátima Portillo | El Salvador | 1:04:47.7 |
| 46 | Wang Yi-chen | Chinese Taipei | 1:04:53.7 |
| 47 | Darya Pushko | Kazakhstan | 1:04:55.2 |
| 48 | Malak Meqdar | Morocco | 1:04:55.8 |
| 49 | Karla Edith de la Rosa | Mexico | 1:04:56.4 |
| 50 | Ruthseli Aponte | Venezuela | 1:04:56.8 |
| 51 | Alondra Quiles | Puerto Rico | 1:05:01.1 |
| 52 | Sezen Akanda Boz | Turkey | 1:05:02.5 |
| 53 | Isabella Hernández | Dominican Republic | 1:07:56.8 |
| 54 | Bangalore Mahesh Rithika | India | 1:08:47.2 |
| 55 | Kathriana Mella Gustianjani | Indonesia | 1:09:00.4 |
| 56 | Mariela Guadamuro | Puerto Rico | 1:09:25.0 |
| 57 | Brynne Kinnaird | Namibia | 1:12:33.5 |
| | Carissa Steyn | Namibia | OTL |
| | María Rodríguez | Bolivia | OTL |
| | Dorianne Bristol | Seychelles | OTL |
| | Swagiah Mubiru | Uganda | OTL |
| | Chantal Liew | Singapore | DNF |
| | María Porres | Guatemala | DNS |
| | Michell Ramírez | Honduras | DNS |
| | Maria Bianchi | Kenya | DNS |
