= Open water swimming at the 2024 World Aquatics Championships – Men's 5 km =

Men's 5 km at the 2024 World Aquatics Championships
- Venue: Old Doha Port
- Location: Doha, Qatar
- Dates: 7 February
- Competitors: 76 from 48 nations
- Winning time: 51:29.3

Medalists
gold medal	Logan Fontaine	France
silver medal	Marc-Antoine Olivier	France
bronze medal	Domenico Acerenza	Italy

The Men's 5 km competition at the 2024 World Aquatics Championships was held on 7 February 2024.

== Results ==
The race was held at 13:00.

Rank	Swimmer	Nationality	Time
1st place, gold medalist(s)	Logan Fontaine	France	51:29.3
2nd place, silver medalist(s)	Marc-Antoine Olivier	France	51:29.6
3rd place, bronze medalist(s)	Domenico Acerenza	Italy	51:30.0
4	Kristóf Rasovszky	Hungary	51:30.5
5	Gregorio Paltrinieri	Italy	51:31.7
6	Dávid Betlehem	Hungary	51:34.8
7	Athanasios Kynigakis	Greece	51:36.1
8	Oliver Klemet	Germany	51:36.4
9	Florian Wellbrock	Germany	51:36.7
10	Paulo Strehlke	Mexico	51:36.8
11	Eric Hedlin	Canada	51:39.1
12	David Farinango	Ecuador	51:40.4
13	Cho Cheng-chi	Chinese Taipei	51:48.1
14	Piotr Woźniak	Poland	51:56.5
15	Martin Straka	Czech Republic	51:56.9
16	Robert Thorpe	Australia	51:59.1
17	Tiago Campos	Portugal	53:19.4
18	Emir Batur Albayrak	Turkey	53:20.7
19	Christian Schreiber	Switzerland	53:22.0
20	Esteban Enderica	Ecuador	53:22.1
21	Guillem Pujol	Spain	53:22.2
22	Logan Vanhuys	Belgium	53:23.4
23	Bailey Armstrong	Australia	53:23.5
24	Joshua Brown	United States	53:23.9
25	Jan Hercog	Austria	53:24.0
26	Lev Cherepanov	Kazakhstan	53:26.0
27	Park Jae-hun	South Korea	53:45.9
28	Diego Dulieu	Honduras	53:50.6
29	Henrique Figueirinha	Brazil	53:50.8
30	Ivan Puskovitch	United States	53:51.0
31	Matěj Kozubek	Czech Republic	54:11.3
32	Diogo Cardoso	Portugal	54:13.3
33	Ronaldo Zambrano	Venezuela	54:13.9
34	Nik Peterlin	Slovenia	54:14.8
35	Pedro Farias	Brazil	54:16.6
36	Bartosz Kapała	Poland	54:16.7
37	Burhanettin Hacı Sağır	Turkey	55:01.2
38	Oh Se-beom	South Korea	55:07.7
39	Asterios Daldogiannis	Greece	55:10.5
40	Zhang Jinhou	China	55:11.5
41	Hau-Li Fan	Canada	55:12.4
42	Tomáš Peciar	Slovakia	55:14.4
43	Liu Peixin	China	55:16.8
44	William Yan Thorley	Hong Kong	55:17.0
45	Aflah Fadlan Prawira	Indonesia	55:17.3
46	Jamarr Bruno	Puerto Rico	55:19.5
47	Connor Albertyn	South Africa	55:19.7
48	Adrián Ywanaga	Peru	55:21.0
49	Santiago Gutiérrez	Mexico	55:22.6
50	Galymzhan Balabek	Kazakhstan	55:23.2
51	Maximiliano Paccot	Uruguay	55:24.7
52	Diego Vera	Venezuela	55:28.2
53	Jeison Rojas	Costa Rica	55:32.2
54	Christian Bayo	Puerto Rico	56:42.1
55	Ilias El Fallaki	Morocco	57:03.2
56	Keith Sin	Hong Kong	57:04.8
57	Richard Urban	Slovakia	57:06.0
58	Théo Druenne	Monaco	57:08.1
59	Ernest Fabian Wijaya	Indonesia	57:35.5
60	Cho Pei-chi	Chinese Taipei	57:37.7
61	Juan Nuñez	Dominican Republic	57:39.7
62	Damien Payet	Seychelles	57:39.7
63	Rossouw Venter	South Africa	57:40.8
64	Nico Esslinger	Namibia	57:41.2
65	Prashans Manjunath Hiremagalur	India	57:43.8
66	Dilanka Shehan	Sri Lanka	1:00:42.9
67	Santiago Reyes	Guatemala	1:00:45.5
68	Diego Solano	Bolivia	1:00:47.3
69	Rayven de los Santos	Dominican Republic	1:00:52.7
70	Thierry Payet	Seychelles	1:01:24.5
71	Army Pal	India	1:01:26.1
72	Davit Sikharulidze	Georgia	1:04:52.1
	Atuhaire Ambala	Uganda	OTL
	Igbaal Bayusuf	Kenya	OTL
	Benco van Rooyen	Botswana	OTL
	Yano Elias	Angola	OTL
