= Brazil at the 2024 World Aquatics Championships =

- Flag of Brazil
- World Aquatics code: BRA
- National federation: Brazilian Confederation of Aquatic Sports
- Website: cbda.org.br (in Portuguese)

in Doha, Qatar
- Competitors: 63 in 6 sports
- Medals Ranked 34th: Gold 0 Silver 0 Bronze 1 Total 1

World Aquatics Championships appearances (overview)
- 1973; 1975; 1978; 1982; 1986; 1991; 1994; 1998; 2001; 2003; 2005; 2007; 2009; 2011; 2013; 2015; 2017; 2019; 2022; 2023; 2024; 2025

Brazil competed at the 2024 World Aquatics Championships in Doha, Qatar from 2 to 18 February.

== Medalists ==
Medal	Name	Sport	Event	Date
Bronze	Ana Marcela Cunha	Open water swimming	Women's 5 km	7 February 2024

== Athletes by discipline ==
The following is the number of competitors who participated at the Championships per discipline.

Sport	Men	Women	Total
Artistic swimming	1	11	12
Diving	3	3	6
High diving	1	1	2
Open water swimming	2	2	4
Swimming	5	7	12
Water polo	13	13	26
Total	25	37	61

== Artistic swimming ==
Brazil entered 12 artistic swimmers.

Men

Athlete	Event	Preliminaries		Final	
Athlete	Event	Points	Rank	Points	Rank
Bernardo Santos	Solo technical routine	182.6351	8 Q	177.2900	11

Women

Athlete	Event	Preliminaries		Final	
Athlete	Event	Points	Rank	Points	Rank
Jullia Catharino	Solo technical routine	209.1350	16	Did not advance	
Jullia Catharino	Solo free routine	191.0187	15	Did not advance	
Laura Miccuci; Gabriela Regly	Duet technical routine	203.9932	24	Did not advance	
Laura Miccuci; Gabriela Regly	Duet free routine	179.1250	17	Did not advance	

Mixed

Athlete	Event	Preliminaries		Final	
Athlete	Event	Points	Rank	Points	Rank
Bernardo Santos; Anna Giulia Veloso	Duet technical routine	196.6817	9 Q	196.6433	9
Bernardo Santos; Anna Giulia Veloso	Duet free routine	141.3770	6 Q	118.0980	8
Vitória Casale; Luzia Galvez; Luiza Lopes; Sara Marinho; Ana Beatriz Nunes; Jaddy Passos; Celina Rangel; Anna Giulia Veloso	Team acrobatic routine	147.3167	19	Did not advance	
Vitória Casale; Luzia Galvez; Luiza Lopes; Sara Marinho; Ana Beatriz Nunes; Jaddy Passos; Celina Rangel; Anna Giulia Veloso	Team technical routine	183.5283	15	Did not advance	
Vitória Casale; Jullia Catharino; Luiza Lopes; Sara Marinho; Ana Beatriz Nunes; Jaddy Passos; Celina Rangel; Anna Giulia Veloso	Team free routine	219.9521	11 Q	225.0126	11

== Diving ==
Brazil entered 6 divers.

Men

Athlete	Event	Preliminaries		Semi-finals		Final	
Athlete	Event	Points	Rank	Points	Rank	Points	Rank
Rafael Borges	1 m springboard	248.80	33	—		Did not advance	
Luis Moura	1 m springboard	315.40	16	—		Did not advance	
Rafael Max	3 m springboard	288.15	48	Did not advance			
Luis Moura	3 m springboard	294.95	46	Did not advance			
Rafael Borges; Luis Moura	3 m synchronized springboard	—				313.71	19

Women

Athlete	Event	Preliminaries		Semi-finals		Final	
Athlete	Event	Points	Rank	Points	Rank	Points	Rank
Luana Lira	1 m springboard	213.55	22	—		Did not advance	
Anna Lúcia dos Santos	1 m springboard	228.65	17	—		Did not advance	
Luana Lira	3 m springboard	219.40	35	Did not advance			
Anna Lúcia dos Santos	3 m springboard	192.00	47	Did not advance			
Luana Lira; Anna Lúcia dos Santos	3 m synchronized springboard	—				230.70	13
Giovanna Pedroso	10 m platform	204.20	38	Did not advance			

== High diving ==
Brazil entered 2 high divers.

Men

Athlete	Event	Points	Rank
Jucelino Lima	Men's high diving	192.90	25

Women

Athlete	Event	Points	Rank
Patrícia Valente	Women's high diving	102.50	18

== Open water swimming ==
Brazil entered 4 open water swimmers.

Men

Athlete	Event	Time	Rank
Pedro Farias	Men's 5 km	54:16.6	35
Henrique Figueirinha	Men's 5 km	53:50.8	29
Pedro Farias	Men's 10 km	1:52:10.9	38
Henrique Figueirinha	Men's 10 km	1:51:43.7	34

Women

Athlete	Event	Time	Rank
Ana Marcela Cunha	Women's 5 km	57:36.8	3rd place, bronze medalist(s)
Viviane Jungblut	Women's 5 km	57:52.9	9
Ana Marcela Cunha	Women's 10 km	1:57:30.8	4
Viviane Jungblut	Women's 10 km	1:57:39.3	14

Mixed

Athlete	Event	Time	Rank
Pedro Farias; Henrique Figueirinha; Ana Marcela Cunha; Viviane Jungblut	Team relay	1:05:36.2	8

== Swimming ==
Brazil entered 12 swimmers.

Men

Athlete	Event	Heat		Semifinal		Final	
Athlete	Event	Time	Rank	Time	Rank	Time	Rank
Breno Correia	100 m freestyle	49.29	27	Did not advance			
Fernando Scheffer	200 m freestyle	1:47.42	18	Did not advance			
Guilherme Costa	200 m freestyle	1:47.28	14 Q	1:46.06	7 Q	1:46.87	8
Guilherme Costa	400 m freestyle	3:46.03	6 Q	—		3:44.22	4
Guilherme Costa	800 m freestyle	7:58.02	27	—		Did not advance	
Guilherme Costa	1500 m freestyle	Did not start					
Matheus Gonche	100 m butterfly	52.44	14 Q	52.12	13	Did not advance	
Matheus Gonche	200 m butterfly	1:58.79	20	Did not advance			
Guilherme Costa; Fernando Scheffer; Breno Correia; Eduardo Moraes	4 × 200 m freestyle relay	7:11.79	9	—		Did not advance	

Women

Athlete	Event	Heat		Semifinal		Final	
Athlete	Event	Time	Rank	Time	Rank	Time	Rank
Stephanie Balduccini	100 m freestyle	54.25	6 Q	54.07	8 Q	54.05	6
Maria Fernanda Costa	200 m freestyle	1:58.22	7 Q	1:57.11 SA	6 Q	1:56.85 SA	5
Maria Fernanda Costa	400 m freestyle	4:05.52 SA	4 Q	—		4:02.86 SA	4
Maria Fernanda Costa	200 m butterfly	Did not start					
Gabrielle Roncatto	400 m freestyle	4:06.13	6 Q	—		4:04.18	5
Gabrielle Roncatto	800 m freestyle	8:37.00	11	—		Did not advance	
Gabrielle Roncatto	400 m medley	4:48.44	15	—		Did not advance	
Beatriz Dizotti	800 m freestyle	8:43.73	17	—		Did not advance	
Beatriz Dizotti	1500 m freestyle	16:25.90	12	—		Did not advance	
Ana Carolina Vieira	50 m breaststroke	31.81	24	Did not advance			
Ana Carolina Vieira	100 m breaststroke	1:10.83	33	Did not advance			
Gabrielle Assis	200 m breaststroke	2:26.28	7 Q	2:25.62	9 Q	2:25.66	7
Ana Carolina Vieira; Stephanie Balduccini; Maria Fernanda Costa; Aline Rodrigues	4 × 100 m freestyle relay	3:41.67	6 Q	—		3:40.56	6
Stephanie Balduccini; Gabrielle Roncatto; Aline Rodrigues; Maria Fernanda Costa	4 × 200 m freestyle relay	7:57.12	4 Q	—		7:52.71 SA	4

== Water polo ==
Summary

Team	Event	Group stage				Playoff	Quarterfinal	Semi-final	Final / BM	
Team	Event	Opposition Score	Opposition Score	Opposition Score	Rank	Opposition Score	Opposition Score	Opposition Score	Opposition Score	Rank
Brazil	Men's tournament	France; L 11–16	Greece; L 4–23	Serbia; L 8–10	4	—		South Africa; W 18–5	Japan; L 11–22	14
Brazil	Women's tournament	Kazakhstan; L 15–16	United States; L 5–21	Netherlands; L 5–27	4	—		France; L 8–17	Singapore; W 18–2	15

=== Men's tournament ===
Team roster

The following is Brazilian roster.

Head coach: Bárbaro Díaz

- 1 Guilherme Barrella GK
- 2 Logan Cabral CB
- 3 Alipio Nardaci FP
- 4 Gustavo Coutinho D
- 5 Roberto Freitas D
- 6 Lucas Andrade FP
- 7 Rafael Real D
- 8 Pedro Real FP
- 9 Marcos Pires FP
- 10 Gabriel da Silva FP
- 11 Gustavo Guimarães D
- 12 Luis Ricardo Silva CF
- 13 Alexandre Mendes GK
- 14 Frederico Carsalade FP

Group play

Pos	Team	Pld	W	PSW	PSL	L	GF	GA	GD	Pts	Qualification
1	Greece	3	3	0	0	0	60	22	+38	9	Quarterfinals
2	France	3	2	0	0	1	44	33	+11	6	Playoffs
3	China	3	1	0	0	2	25	48	−23	3	Playoffs
4	Brazil	3	0	0	0	3	23	49	−26	0	13–16th place semifinals

Source: World Aquatics
Rules for classification: 1) points; 2) head-to-head points; 3) head-to-head goal difference; 4) head-to-head number of goals scored; 5) Goal difference.

5 February 2024; 12:00	Report	Brazil	11–16	France	Aspire Dome, Doha; Referees: Darren Spiritosanto (USA), Andreia Stanojević (SRB)
5 February 2024; 12:00	Report	Score by quarters: 1–3, 4–5, 3–4, 3–4			Aspire Dome, Doha; Referees: Darren Spiritosanto (USA), Andreia Stanojević (SRB)
5 February 2024; 12:00	Report	R. Real 5	Goals	Vernoux 6	Aspire Dome, Doha; Referees: Darren Spiritosanto (USA), Andreia Stanojević (SRB)

7 February 2024; 10:30	Report	Greece	23–4	Brazil	Aspire Dome, Doha; Referees: György Kun (HUN), Alessandro Severo (ITA)
7 February 2024; 10:30	Report	Score by quarters: 6–3, 4–0, 6–0, 7–1			Aspire Dome, Doha; Referees: György Kun (HUN), Alessandro Severo (ITA)
7 February 2024; 10:30	Report	Fountoulis 4	Goals	Pires 2	Aspire Dome, Doha; Referees: György Kun (HUN), Alessandro Severo (ITA)

9 February 2024; 20:30	Report	Brazil	8–10	China	Aspire Dome, Doha; Referees: Alessandro Severo (ITA), David Couper (NZL)
9 February 2024; 20:30	Report	Score by quarters: 3–2, 2–1, 1–3, 2–4			Aspire Dome, Doha; Referees: Alessandro Severo (ITA), David Couper (NZL)
9 February 2024; 20:30	Report	Freitas 3	Goals	Chen Z. 3	Aspire Dome, Doha; Referees: Alessandro Severo (ITA), David Couper (NZL)

13–16th place semifinals

11 February 2024; 09:00	Report	South Africa	5–18	Brazil	Aspire Dome, Doha; Referees: Matan Schwartz (ISR), Giuliana Nicolosi (ITA)
11 February 2024; 09:00	Report	Score by quarters: 4–5, 0–4, 0–3, 1–6			Aspire Dome, Doha; Referees: Matan Schwartz (ISR), Giuliana Nicolosi (ITA)
11 February 2024; 09:00	Report	Howard 2	Goals	Freitas, R. Real 4	Aspire Dome, Doha; Referees: Matan Schwartz (ISR), Giuliana Nicolosi (ITA)

13th place game

13 February 2024; 10:30	Report	Brazil	11–22	Japan	Aspire Dome, Doha; Referees: Zhang Liang (CHN), Nóra Debreceni (HUN)
13 February 2024; 10:30	Report	Score by quarters: 4–6, 2–5, 3–5, 2–6			Aspire Dome, Doha; Referees: Zhang Liang (CHN), Nóra Debreceni (HUN)
13 February 2024; 10:30	Report	R. Real 3	Goals	Inaba 7	Aspire Dome, Doha; Referees: Zhang Liang (CHN), Nóra Debreceni (HUN)

=== Women's tournament ===
Team roster

The following is Brazilian roster.

Head coach: Paulo Rocha

- 1 Isabela Souza GK
- 2 Yandra Ramos FP
- 3 Luana Bonetti FP
- 4 Karen Silva FP
- 5 Stefany Azevedo FP
- 6 Jennifer Cavalcante FP
- 7 Samantha Ferreira FP
- 8 Debora Silva FP
- 9 Letícia Belorio FP
- 10 Rebecca Moreir FP
- 11 Mirella Coutinho FP
- 12 Maiah Nascimento FP
- 13 Hemanuelle Scalabrin GK
- 14 Ana Vasconcelos FP

Group play

Pos	Team	Pld	W	PSW	PSL	L	GF	GA	GD	Pts	Qualification
1	United States	3	3	0	0	0	63	16	+47	9	Quarterfinals
2	Netherlands	3	2	0	0	1	62	19	+43	6	Playoffs
3	Kazakhstan	3	0	1	0	2	17	69	−52	2	Playoffs
4	Brazil	3	0	0	1	2	20	58	−38	1	13–16th place semifinals

Source: World Aquatics
Rules for classification: 1) points; 2) head-to-head points; 3) head-to-head goal difference; 4) head-to-head number of goals scored; 5) Goal difference.

4 February 2024; 09:00	Report	Kazakhstan	16–15 (PSO)	Brazil	Aspire Dome, Doha; Referees: Tamas Couper (NZL), Matan Painchaud (CAN)
4 February 2024; 09:00	Report	Score by quarters: 1–2, 2–2, 5–3, 2–3 PSO: 6–5			Aspire Dome, Doha; Referees: Tamas Couper (NZL), Matan Painchaud (CAN)
4 February 2024; 09:00	Report	Novikova, Pochinok 3	Goals	Cavalcante 4	Aspire Dome, Doha; Referees: Tamas Couper (NZL), Matan Painchaud (CAN)

6 February 2024; 20:30	Report	Brazil	5–21	United States	Aspire Dome, Doha; Referees: György Kun (HUN), Stanko Ivanovski (MNE)
6 February 2024; 20:30	Report	Score by quarters: 2–7, 1–6, 0–4, 2–4			Aspire Dome, Doha; Referees: György Kun (HUN), Stanko Ivanovski (MNE)
6 February 2024; 20:30	Report	Belorio 2	Goals	Steffens 5	Aspire Dome, Doha; Referees: György Kun (HUN), Stanko Ivanovski (MNE)

8 February 2024; 16:00	Report	Brazil	5–27	Netherlands	Aspire Dome, Doha; Referees: Giuliana Nicolosi (ITA), David Couper (NZL)
8 February 2024; 16:00	Report	Score by quarters: 1–7, 1–4, 2–7, 1–9			Aspire Dome, Doha; Referees: Giuliana Nicolosi (ITA), David Couper (NZL)
8 February 2024; 16:00	Report	Ferreira 2	Goals	three players 5	Aspire Dome, Doha; Referees: Giuliana Nicolosi (ITA), David Couper (NZL)

13–16th place semifinals

10 February 2024; 09:00	Report	Brazil	8–17	France	Aspire Dome, Doha; Referees: Hélène Painchaud (CAN), Asumi Tsuzaki (JPN)
10 February 2024; 09:00	Report	Score by quarters: 1–4, 1–3, 2–5, 4–5			Aspire Dome, Doha; Referees: Hélène Painchaud (CAN), Asumi Tsuzaki (JPN)
10 February 2024; 09:00	Report	Belorio 4	Goals	Hertzka, Vernoux 4	Aspire Dome, Doha; Referees: Hélène Painchaud (CAN), Asumi Tsuzaki (JPN)

15th place game

12 February 2024; 09:00	Report	Brazil	18–2	Singapore	Aspire Dome, Doha; Referees: Viktor Salnichenko (KAZ), Lucas Letshabo (RSA)
12 February 2024; 09:00	Report	Score by quarters: 4–0, 2–0, 4–0, 8–2			Aspire Dome, Doha; Referees: Viktor Salnichenko (KAZ), Lucas Letshabo (RSA)
12 February 2024; 09:00	Report	three players 3	Goals	Lee, Lim 1	Aspire Dome, Doha; Referees: Viktor Salnichenko (KAZ), Lucas Letshabo (RSA)
