= Netherlands at the 2024 World Aquatics Championships =

- Flag of the Netherlands
- World Aquatics code: NED
- National federation: Royal Dutch Swimming Federation
- Website: knzb.nl

in Doha, Qatar
- Competitors: 41 in 6 sports
- Medals Ranked 4th: Gold 5 Silver 4 Bronze 0 Total 9

World Aquatics Championships appearances
- 1973; 1975; 1978; 1982; 1986; 1991; 1994; 1998; 2001; 2003; 2005; 2007; 2009; 2011; 2013; 2015; 2017; 2019; 2022; 2023; 2024; 2025

The Netherlands competed at the 2024 World Aquatics Championships in Doha, Qatar from 2 to 18 February.

== Medalists ==
Medal	Name	Sport	Event	Date
1st place, gold medalist(s)	Sharon van Rouwendaal	Open water swimming	Women's 10 km	3 February 2024
1st place, gold medalist(s)	Sharon van Rouwendaal	Open water swimming	Women's 5 km	7 February 2024
1st place, gold medalist(s)	Kim Busch; Janna van Kooten; Kira Toussaint; Marrit Steenbergen; Milou van Wijk	Swimming	Women's 4 × 100 metre freestyle relay	11 February 2024
1st place, gold medalist(s)	Marrit Steenbergen	Swimming	Women's 100 metre freestyle	16 February 2024
1st place, gold medalist(s)	Tes Schouten	Swimming	Women's 200 metre breaststroke	16 February 2024
2nd place, silver medalist(s)	Bregje de Brouwer; Noortje de Brouwer	Artistic swimming	Women's duet free routine	8 February 2024
2nd place, silver medalist(s)	Tes Schouten	Swimming	Women's 100 metre breaststroke	13 February 2024
2nd place, silver medalist(s)	Caspar Corbeau	Swimming	Men's 200 metre breaststroke	16 February 2024
2nd place, silver medalist(s)	Kai van Westering; Arno Kamminga; Nyls Korstanje; Stan Pijnenburg; Caspar Corbeau	Swimming	Men's 4 × 100 metre medley relay	18 February 2024

== Competitors ==
The following is the list of competitors in the Championships.

Sport	Men	Women	Total
Artistic swimming	0	3	3
Diving	0	3	3
High diving	0	1	1
Open water swimming	0	1	1
Swimming	8	10	18
Water polo	0	15	15
Total	8	33	41

== Artistic swimming ==
Women

Athlete	Event	Preliminaries		Final	
Athlete	Event	Points	Rank	Points	Rank
Marloes Steenbeek	Solo technical routine	231.9267	8 Q	210.9300	10
Marloes Steenbeek	Solo free routine	200.9729	11 Q	207.0979	8
Bregje de Brouwer; Noortje de Brouwer	Duet technical routine	251.5750	7 Q	251.8633	4
Bregje de Brouwer; Noortje de Brouwer	Duet free routine	244.2439	2 Q	250.4979	2nd place, silver medalist(s)

== Diving ==
Women

Athlete	Event	Preliminaries		Semifinals		Final	
Athlete	Event	Points	Rank	Points	Rank	Points	Rank
Else Praasterink	10 m platform	286.90	12 Q	285.80	9 Q	271.10	11
Inge Jansen; Celine van Duijn	3 m synchro springboard	—N/a				255.30	11

== High diving ==
Athlete	Event	Points	Rank
Ginni van Katwijk	Women's high diving	224.80	13

== Open water swimming ==
Women

Athlete	Event	Time	Rank
Sharon van Rouwendaal	Women's 5 km	57:33.9	1st place, gold medalist(s)
Sharon van Rouwendaal	Women's 10 km	1:57:26.8	1st place, gold medalist(s)

== Swimming ==
Netherlands entered 18 swimmers.

Men

Athlete	Event	Heat		Semifinal		Final	
Athlete	Event	Time	Rank	Time	Rank	Time	Rank
Caspar Corbeau	50 metre breaststroke	27.11	10 Q	27.30	15	Did not advance	
Caspar Corbeau	100 metre breaststroke	59.38	4 Q	59.33	6 Q	59.37	7
Caspar Corbeau	200 metre breaststroke	2:10.85	4 Q	2:09.34	3 Q	2:08.24	2nd place, silver medalist(s)
Thom de Boer	50 metre freestyle	22.13	17	Did not advance			
Thomas Jansen	400 metre individual medley	Disqualified		—N/a		Did not advance	
Arno Kamminga	100 metre breaststroke	59.61	6 Q	58.87	3 Q	59.22	5
Arno Kamminga	200 metre breaststroke	2:11.22	8 Q	2:10.30	8 Q	2:10.06	7
Nyls Korstanje	50 metre butterfly	23.02	1 Q	23.25	9	Did not advance	
Nyls Korstanje	100 metre butterfly	51.70	3 Q	51.75	7 Q	51.41	4
Kenzo Simons	50 metre freestyle	21.89	9 Q	21.73	6 Q	21.81	6
Kai van Westering	100 metre backstroke	53.84	9 Q	53.80	9	Did not advance	
Kai van Westering	200 metre backstroke	1:57.29	2 Q	1:56.91	7 Q	1:57.19	8
Kai van Westering; Arno Kamminga; Nyls Korstanje; Stan Pijnenburg; Caspar Corbeau	4 × 100 m medley relay	3:32.89 NR	2 Q	—N/a		3:31.23 NR	2nd place, silver medalist(s)

Women

Athlete	Event	Heat		Semifinal		Final	
Athlete	Event	Time	Rank	Time	Rank	Time	Rank
Kim Busch	50 metre freestyle	25.08	14 Q	24.86	12	Did not advance	
Kim Busch	50 metre butterfly	25.93	7 Q	26.25	13	Did not advance	
Imani de Jong	400 metre freestyle	4:14.20	16	—N/a		Did not advance	
Imani de Jong	800 metre freestyle	8:49.08	20	—N/a		Did not advance	
Imani de Jong	1500 metre freestyle	16:43.55	20	—N/a		Did not advance	
Maaike de Waard	50 metre backstroke	28.39	14 Q	28.14	9	Did not advance	
Maaike de Waard	100 metre backstroke	1:00.61	9 Q	1:00.68	8 Q	1:00.64	7
Maaike de Waard	50 metre butterfly	26.13	12 Q	26.05	11	Did not advance	
Tes Schouten	100 metre breaststroke	1:06.46	2 Q	1:06.30	4 Q	1:05.82	2nd place, silver medalist(s)
Tes Schouten	200 metre breaststroke	2:25.90	5 Q	2:21.50 NR	1 Q	2:19.81 NR	1st place, gold medalist(s)
Marrit Steenbergen	50 metre freestyle	24.86	10 Q	24.74	9	Did not advance	
Marrit Steenbergen	100 metre freestyle	53.66	2 Q	52.53 NR	1 Q	52.26 NR	1st place, gold medalist(s)
Marrit Steenbergen	200 metre freestyle	1:58.18	6 Q	1:57.30	9	Did not advance	
Marrit Steenbergen	200 metre individual medley	2:11.45	3 Q	2:11.23	6	2:10.24	5
Kira Toussaint	50 metre backstroke	28.33	9 Q	28.13	7 Q	28.18	7
Kira Toussaint	100 metre backstroke	1:00.50	8 Q	1:00.37	6 Q	1:00.73	8
Janna van Kooten	200 metre freestyle	1:59.41	16 Q	2:00.44	16	Did not advance	
Kim Busch; Janna van Kooten; Kira Toussaint; Marrit Steenbergen; Milou van Wijk	4 × 100 m freestyle relay	3:40.42	4 Q	—N/a		3:36.61	1st place, gold medalist(s)
Imani de Jong; Silke Holkenborg; Marrit Steenbergen; Janna van Kooten; Yara van Kalmthout	4 × 200 m freestyle relay	7:58.63	8 Q	—N/a		7:55.84	7
Kira Toussaint; Tes Schouten; Maaike de Waard; Kim Busch	4 × 100 m medley relay	4:02.09	4 Q	—N/a		4:00.24	5

Mixed

Athlete	Event	Heat		Semifinal		Final	
Athlete	Event	Time	Rank	Time	Rank	Time	Rank
Stan Pijnenburg; Caspar Corbeau; Kira Toussaint; Marrit Steenbergen; Thom de Boer; Milou van Wijk; Janna van Kooten	4 × 100 m freestyle relay	3:29.23	6 Q	—N/a		3:25.14	6
Maaike de Waard; Caspar Corbeau; Nyls Korstanje; Kira Toussaint	4 × 100 m medley relay	Disqualified		—N/a		Did not advance	

== Water polo ==
Summary

Team	Event	Group stage				Playoff	Quarterfinal	Semifinal	Final / BM	
Team	Event	Opposition Score	Opposition Score	Opposition Score	Rank	Opposition Score	Opposition Score	Opposition Score	Opposition Score	Rank
Netherlands	Women's tournament	United States; L 8–10	Kazakhstan; W 27–4	Brazil; W 27–5	2 QP	China; W 16–14	Hungary; L 12–13	Italy; W 10–5	Australia; W 10–8	5

=== Women's tournament ===
Team roster

The following is the Dutch roster.

Head coach: Evangelos Doudesis

- 1 Laura Aarts GK
- 2 Iris Wolves FP
- 3 Brigitte Sleeking FP
- 4 Sabrina van der Sloot FP
- 5 Maartje Keuning FP
- 6 Simone van de Kraats FP
- 7 Bente Rogge FP
- 8 Vivian Sevenich FP
- 9 Kitty-Lynn Joustra FP
- 10 Lieke Rogge FP
- 11 Lola Moolhuijzen FP
- 12 Nina ten Broek FP
- 13 Sarah Buis GK
- 14 Marit van der Weijden FP
- 15 Maxine Schaap FP

Group play

Pos	Team	Pld	W	PSW	PSL	L	GF	GA	GD	Pts	Qualification
1	United States	3	3	0	0	0	63	16	+47	9	Quarterfinals
2	Netherlands	3	2	0	0	1	62	19	+43	6	Playoffs
3	Kazakhstan	3	0	1	0	2	17	69	−52	2	Playoffs
4	Brazil	3	0	0	1	2	20	58	−38	1	13–16th place semifinals

Source: World Aquatics
Rules for classification: 1) points; 2) head-to-head points; 3) head-to-head goal difference; 4) head-to-head number of goals scored; 5) Goal difference.

4 February 2024; 18:45	Report	United States	10–8	Netherlands	Aspire Dome, Doha; Referees: Nóra Debreceni (HUN), Giuliana Nicolosi (ITA)
4 February 2024; 18:45	Report	Score by quarters: 3–2, 3–3, 3–1, 1–2			Aspire Dome, Doha; Referees: Nóra Debreceni (HUN), Giuliana Nicolosi (ITA)
4 February 2024; 18:45	Report	three players 2	Goals	Van de Kraats 4	Aspire Dome, Doha; Referees: Nóra Debreceni (HUN), Giuliana Nicolosi (ITA)

6 February 2024; 17:30	Report	Netherlands	27–4	Kazakhstan	Aspire Dome, Doha; Referees: David Couper (NZL), Asumi Tsuzaki (JPN)
6 February 2024; 17:30	Report	Score by quarters: 6–0, 4–1, 8–3, 9–0			Aspire Dome, Doha; Referees: David Couper (NZL), Asumi Tsuzaki (JPN)
6 February 2024; 17:30	Report	Joustra 7	Goals	Tsoy 2	Aspire Dome, Doha; Referees: David Couper (NZL), Asumi Tsuzaki (JPN)

8 February 2024; 16:00	Report	Brazil	5–27	Netherlands	Aspire Dome, Doha; Referees: Giuliana Nicolosi (ITA), David Couper (NZL)
8 February 2024; 16:00	Report	Score by quarters: 1–7, 1–4, 2–7, 1–9			Aspire Dome, Doha; Referees: Giuliana Nicolosi (ITA), David Couper (NZL)
8 February 2024; 16:00	Report	Ferreira 2	Goals	three players 5	Aspire Dome, Doha; Referees: Giuliana Nicolosi (ITA), David Couper (NZL)

Playoffs

10 February 2024; 12:00	Report	Netherlands	16–14	China	Aspire Dome, Doha; Referees: Jennifer McCall (USA), Lucas Letshabo (RSA)
10 February 2024; 12:00	Report	Score by quarters: 5–5, 3–2, 5–4, 3–3			Aspire Dome, Doha; Referees: Jennifer McCall (USA), Lucas Letshabo (RSA)
10 February 2024; 12:00	Report	three players 3	Goals	Lu 5	Aspire Dome, Doha; Referees: Jennifer McCall (USA), Lucas Letshabo (RSA)

Quarterfinals

12 February 2024; 19:00	Report	Hungary	13–12 (PSO)	Netherlands	Aspire Dome, Doha; Referees: Sébastien Dervieux (FRA), Jennifer McCall (USA)
12 February 2024; 19:00	Report	Score by quarters: 1–1, 3–1, 1–2, 3–4 PSO: 5–4			Aspire Dome, Doha; Referees: Sébastien Dervieux (FRA), Jennifer McCall (USA)
12 February 2024; 19:00	Report	Keszthelyi 3	Goals	three players 2	Aspire Dome, Doha; Referees: Sébastien Dervieux (FRA), Jennifer McCall (USA)

5–8th place semifinals

14 February 2024; 14:30	Report	Netherlands	10–5	Italy	Aspire Dome, Doha; Referees: Boris Margeta (SLO), György Kun (HUN)
14 February 2024; 14:30	Report	Score by quarters: 5–1, 2–3, 1–1, 2–0			Aspire Dome, Doha; Referees: Boris Margeta (SLO), György Kun (HUN)
14 February 2024; 14:30	Report	L. Rogge, van de Kraats 3	Goals	Giustini 2	Aspire Dome, Doha; Referees: Boris Margeta (SLO), György Kun (HUN)

Fifth place game

16 February 2024; 16:00	Report	Australia	8–10	Netherlands	Aspire Dome, Doha; Referees: Jennifer McCall (USA), Nóra Debreceni (HUN)
16 February 2024; 16:00	Report	Score by quarters: 1–2, 5–1, 1–3, 1–4			Aspire Dome, Doha; Referees: Jennifer McCall (USA), Nóra Debreceni (HUN)
16 February 2024; 16:00	Report	Kearns 3	Goals	Van de Kraats 3	Aspire Dome, Doha; Referees: Jennifer McCall (USA), Nóra Debreceni (HUN)
