= Open water swimming at the 2024 World Aquatics Championships – Women's 10 km =

Women's 10 km at the 2024 World Aquatics Championships
- Venue: Old Doha Port
- Location: Doha, Qatar
- Dates: 3 February
- Competitors: 71 from 40 nations
- Winning time: 1:57:26.8

Medalists
gold medal	Sharon van Rouwendaal	Netherlands
silver medal	María de Valdés	Spain
bronze medal	Angélica André	Portugal

The Women's 10 km competition at the 2024 World Aquatics Championships was held on 3 February 2024.

== Results ==
The race was held at 10:30.

Rank	Swimmer	Nationality	Time
1st place, gold medalist(s)	Sharon van Rouwendaal	Netherlands	1:57:26.8
2nd place, silver medalist(s)	María de Valdés	Spain	1:57:26.9
3rd place, bronze medalist(s)	Angélica André	Portugal	1:57:28.2
4	Moesha Johnson	Australia	1:57:30.8
4	Ana Marcela Cunha	Brazil	1:57:30.8
6	Mariah Denigan	United States	1:57:31.1
7	Caroline Jouisse	France	1:57:32.3
8	Arianna Bridi	Italy	1:57:33.2
9	Lisa Pou	Monaco	1:57:33.4
10	Océane Cassignol	France	1:57:34.9
11	Airi Ebina	Japan	1:57:35.5
12	Bettina Fábián	Hungary	1:57:36.5
13	Ángela Martínez	Spain	1:57:36.6
14	Viviane Jungblut	Brazil	1:57:39.3
15	Katie Grimes	United States	1:57:39.4
16	Jeannette Spiwoks	Germany	1:57:46.0
17	Leah Crisp	Great Britain	1:57:50.0
18	Maddy Gough	Australia	1:57:51.7
19	Mafalda Rosa	Portugal	1:57:52.9
20	Leonie Beck	Germany	1:58:11.8
21	Ichika Kajimoto	Japan	1:58:17.4
22	Ginevra Taddeucci	Italy	1:58:21.1
23	Martha Sandoval	Mexico	1:58:21.6
24	Emma Finlin	Canada	1:58:22.3
25	María Bramont-Arias	Peru	1:58:35.2
26	Mira Szimcsák	Hungary	1:58:37.5
27	Amica de Jager	South Africa	1:58:38.6
28	Amber Keegan	Great Britain	1:59:00.4
29	Callan Lotter	South Africa	2:00:07.9
30	Paola Pérez	Venezuela	2:00:22.5
31	Samantha Arévalo	Ecuador	2:00:55.8
32	Eva Fabian	Israel	2:02:19.8
33	Candela Giordanino	Argentina	2:03:09.1
34	Eden Girloanta	Israel	2:03:56.7
35	Alena Benešová	Czech Republic	2:03:58.9
36	Georgia Makri	Greece	2:04:05.9
37	Xin Xin	China	2:04:21.1
38	Chantal Liew	Singapore	2:04:22.8
39	Nip Tsz Yin	Hong Kong	2:05:10.6
40	Mao Yihan	China	2:06:07.6
41	Lenka Pavlacká	Czech Republic	2:06:12.6
42	Lee Hae-rim	South Korea	2:06:14.6
43	Paulina Alanís	Mexico	2:06:16.6
44	Klara Bošnjak	Croatia	2:06:25.3
45	Tuna Erdoğan	Turkey	2:06:42.6
46	Ana Abad	Ecuador	2:07:26.7
47	Teng Yu-wen	Chinese Taipei	2:07:28.6
48	Špela Perše	Slovenia	2:07:38.7
49	Kamonchanok Kwanmuang	Thailand	2:07:42.1
50	Nikita Lam	Hong Kong	2:08:05.8
51	Laila Oravsky	Canada	2:09:16.4
52	Katja Fain	Slovenia	2:11:00.3
53	Park Jung-ju	South Korea	2:12:15.2
54	Britta Schwengle	Aruba	2:13:36.9
55	Wang Yi-chen	Chinese Taipei	2:15:32.6
56	Yanci Vanegas	Guatemala	2:15:33.2
57	Mariya Fedotova	Kazakhstan	2:16:01.9
58	Diana Taszhanova	Kazakhstan	2:17:32.7
59	Pimpun Choopong	Thailand	2:17:34.9
60	María Porres	Guatemala	2:17:36.9
61	Alondra Quiles	Puerto Rico	2:17:38.8
62	Ruthseli Aponte	Venezuela	2:17:43.6
63	Fátima Portillo	El Salvador	2:21:11.7
64	Ashmitha Chandra	India	2:21:11.8
65	Isabella Hernández	Dominican Republic	2:21:38.7
66	Mariela Guadamuro	Puerto Rico	2:22:31.3
67	Ashley Ng	Singapore	2:26:08.4
	Mahalakshmi Porur Kalan Rajagopal Ravi	India	OTL
	Sezen Akanda Boz	Turkey	DNF
	Cecilia Biagioli	Argentina	DNF
	Rafaela Santo	Angola	DNF
