= Open water swimming at the 2024 World Aquatics Championships – Men's 10 km =

Event at World Aquatics Championships

Men's 10 km at the 2024 World Aquatics Championships
- Venue: Old Doha Port
- Location: Doha, Qatar
- Dates: 4 February
- Competitors: 79 from 49 nations
- Winning time: 1:48:21.2

Medalists
| gold medal | Kristóf Rasovszky | Hungary |
| silver medal | Marc-Antoine Olivier | France |
| bronze medal | Hector Pardoe | Great Britain |

The Men's 10 km competition at the 2024 World Aquatics Championships was held on 4 February 2024.

== Results ==
The race was held at 10:30.

| Rank | Swimmer | Nationality | Time |
|---|---|---|---|
| 1st place, gold medalist(s) | Kristóf Rasovszky | Hungary | 1:48:21.2 |
| 2nd place, silver medalist(s) | Marc-Antoine Olivier | France | 1:48:23.6 |
| 3rd place, bronze medalist(s) | Hector Pardoe | Great Britain | 1:48:29.2 |
| 4 | Logan Fontaine | France | 1:48:29.5 |
| 5 | Nicholas Sloman | Australia | 1:48:29.6 |
| 6 | Dávid Betlehem | Hungary | 1:48:29.9 |
| 7 | Domenico Acerenza | Italy | 1:48:30.4 |
| 8 | Dario Verani | Italy | 1:48:30.8 |
| 9 | Kyle Lee | Australia | 1:48:31.2 |
| 10 | Matan Roditi | Israel | 1:48:31.7 |
| 11 | Oliver Klemet | Germany | 1:48:32.3 |
| 12 | David Farinango | Ecuador | 1:48:34.4 |
| 13 | Athanasios Kynigakis | Greece | 1:48:34.6 |
| 14 | Ivan Puskovitch | United States | 1:48:54.4 |
| 15 | Toby Robinson | Great Britain | 1:48:54.7 |
| 16 | Jan Hercog | Austria | 1:48:58.7 |
| 17 | Martin Straka | Czech Republic | 1:48:58.8 |
| 18 | Paulo Strehlke | Mexico | 1:49:05.9 |
| 19 | Michael Brinegar | United States | 1:49:18.8 |
| 20 | Piotr Woźniak | Poland | 1:49:45.5 |
| 21 | Matěj Kozubek | Czech Republic | 1:49:47.3 |
| 22 | Esteban Enderica | Ecuador | 1:49:53.5 |
| 23 | Tiago Campos | Portugal | 1:49:54.5 |
| 24 | Guillem Pujol | Spain | 1:49:55.5 |
| 25 | Taishin Minamide | Japan | 1:49:57.2 |
| 26 | Diogo Cardoso | Portugal | 1:49:58.2 |
| 27 | Emir Batur Albayrak | Turkey | 1:49:58.6 |
| 28 | Cho Cheng-chi | Chinese Taipei | 1:49:58.7 |
| 29 | Florian Wellbrock | Germany | 1:49:59.0 |
| 30 | Lucas Alba | Argentina | 1:50:08.5 |
| 31 | Eric Hedlin | Canada | 1:50:17.9 |
| 32 | Juan Morales | Colombia | 1:50:43.8 |
| 33 | Logan Vanhuys | Belgium | 1:51:25.0 |
| 34 | Henrique Figueirinha | Brazil | 1:51:43.7 |
| 35 | Franco Cassini | Argentina | 1:52:08.6 |
| 36 | Hau-Li Fan | Canada | 1:52:08.7 |
| 37 | Ido Gal | Israel | 1:52:08.7 |
| 38 | Pedro Farias | Brazil | 1:52:10.9 |
| 39 | William Yan Thorley | Hong Kong | 1:52:11.5 |
| 40 | Johndry Segovia | Venezuela | 1:52:14.1 |
| 41 | Bartosz Kapała | Poland | 1:53:47.4 |
| 42 | Christian Schreiber | Switzerland | 1:53:48.0 |
| 43 | Asterios Daldogiannis | Greece | 1:53:51.7 |
| 44 | Adrián Ywanaga | Peru | 1:53:54.6 |
| 45 | Kaiki Furuhata | Japan | 1:53:58.5 |
| 46 | Burhanettin Hacı Sağır | Turkey | 1:54:00.3 |
| 47 | Ratthawit Thammananthachote | Thailand | 1:54:02.0 |
| 48 | Phillip Seidler | Namibia | 1:54:04.2 |
| 49 | Artyom Lukasevits | Singapore | 1:54:05.0 |
| 50 | Jaan Pasko | Estonia | 1:54:05.3 |
| 51 | Zhang Jinhou | China | 1:54:06.0 |
| 52 | Théo Druenne | Monaco | 1:54:20.8 |
| 53 | Henre Louw | South Africa | 1:54:33.1 |
| 54 | Park Jae-hun | South Korea | 1:54:33.9 |
| 55 | Aflah Fadlan Prawira | Indonesia | 1:54:33.9 |
| 56 | Oh Se-beom | South Korea | 1:54:34.5 |
| 57 | Nik Peterlin | Slovenia | 1:54:34.9 |
| 58 | Ruan Breytenbach | South Africa | 1:54:41.2 |
| 59 | Lev Cherepanov | Kazakhstan | 1:55:24.7 |
| 60 | Daniel Delgadillo | Mexico | 1:57:05.0 |
| 61 | Marin Mogić | Croatia | 1:58:08.3 |
| 62 | Diego Dulieu | Honduras | 1:58:51.5 |
| 63 | Liu Peixin | China | 1:59:41.7 |
| 64 | Jeison Rojas | Costa Rica | 2:00:09.6 |
| 65 | Maximiliano Paccot | Uruguay | 2:01:03.5 |
| 66 | Anurag Singh | India | 2:01:42.0 |
| 67 | Jamarr Bruno | Puerto Rico | 2:01:52.5 |
| 68 | Keith Sin | Hong Kong | 2:02:12.3 |
| 69 | Daniil Androssov | Kazakhstan | 2:03:37.2 |
| 70 | Diego Vera | Venezuela | 2:06:09.9 |
| 71 | Ilias El Fallaki | Morocco | 2:07:31.0 |
| 72 | Cho Pei-chi | Chinese Taipei | 2:07:35.8 |
| 73 | Navaphat Wongcharoen | Thailand | 2:09:34.0 |
| 74 | Santiago Reyes | Guatemala | 2:09:54.0 |
| 75 | Rayven de los Santos | Dominican Republic | 2:12:53.9 |
| 76 | Juan Nuñez | Dominican Republic | 2:13:40.5 |
| 77 | Sheldon Tan | Singapore | 2:14:57.3 |
| | Alejandro Plaza | Bolivia | OTL |
| | Christian Bayo | Puerto Rico | DNF |
