= Ecuador at the 2024 World Aquatics Championships =

- Flag of Ecuador
- FINA code: ECU
- National federation: Federación Ecuatoriana de Natación
- Website: fena-ecuador.org

in Doha, Qatar
- Competitors: 5 in 2 sports
- Medals: Gold 0 Silver 0 Bronze 0 Total 0

World Aquatics Championships appearances
- 1973; 1975; 1978; 1982; 1986; 1991; 1994; 1998; 2001; 2003; 2005; 2007; 2009; 2011; 2013; 2015; 2017; 2019; 2022; 2023; 2024

Ecuador competed at the 2024 World Aquatics Championships in Doha, Qatar from 2 to 18 February.

== Competitors ==
The following is the list of competitors in the Championships.

| Sport | Men | Women | Total |
|---|---|---|---|
| Open water swimming | 2 | 2 | 4 |
| Swimming | 1 | 0 | 1 |
| Total | 3 | 2 | 5 |

== Open water swimming ==
Men

| Athlete | Event | Time | Rank |
|---|---|---|---|
| Esteban Enderica | Men's 5 km | 53:22.1 | 20 |
| Esteban Enderica | Men's 10 km | 1:49:53.5 | 22 |
| David Farinango | Men's 5 km | 51:40.4 | 12 |
| David Farinango | Men's 10 km | 1:48:34.4 | 12 |

Women

| Athlete | Event | Time | Rank |
|---|---|---|---|
| Ana Abad | Women's 5 km | 59:21.9 | 37 |
| Ana Abad | Women's 10 km | 2:07:26.7 | 46 |
| Samantha Arévalo | Women's 5 km | 59:10.5 | 29 |
| Samantha Arévalo | Women's 10 km | 2:00:55.8 | 31 |

== Swimming ==
Ecuador entered 1 swimmers.

Men

| Athlete | Event | Heat | | Semifinal | | Final | |
| Athlete | Event | Time | Rank | Time | Rank | Time | Rank |
|---|---|---|---|---|---|---|---|
| Tomás Peribonio | 100 metre breaststroke | 1:04.74 | 56 | Did not advance | | | |
| Tomás Peribonio | 200 metre individual medley | 2:04.97 | 29 | Did not advance | | | |
