= Japan at the 2024 World Aquatics Championships =

- Flag of Japan
- FINA code: JPN
- National federation: Japan Swimming Federation
- Website: swim.or.jp (in Japanese)

in Doha, Qatar
- Competitors: 50 in 5 sports
- Medals Ranked 17th: Gold 1 Silver 1 Bronze 2 Total 4

World Aquatics Championships appearances
- 1973; 1975; 1978; 1982; 1986; 1991; 1994; 1998; 2001; 2003; 2005; 2007; 2009; 2011; 2013; 2015; 2017; 2019; 2022; 2023; 2024

Japan competed at the 2024 World Aquatics Championships in Doha, Qatar from 2 to 18 February.

== Medalists ==
Medal	Name	Sport	Event	Date
1st place, gold medalist(s)	Tomoru Honda	Swimming	Men's 200 metre butterfly	14 February 2024
2nd place, silver medalist(s)	Moe Higa Moeka Kijima Uta Kobayashi Tomoka Sato; Ami Wada Akane Yanagisawa Mashiro Yasunaga Megumu Yoshida	Artistic swimming	Team free routine	9 February 2024
3rd place, bronze medalist(s)	Moe Higa Moeka Kijima Uta Kobayashi Tomoka Sato; Ayano Shimada Ami Wada Mashiro Yasunaga Megumu Yoshida	Artistic swimming	Team technical routine	4 February 2024
3rd place, bronze medalist(s)	Daiya Seto	Swimming	Men's 400 metre individual medley	18 February 2024

== Competitors ==
The following is the list of competitors in the Championships.

Sport	Men	Women	Total
Artistic swimming	0	10	10
Diving	5	5	10
Open water swimming	2	2*	4*
Swimming	9	3*	12*
Water polo	15	0	15
Total	31	19*	50*

Ichika Kajimoto competed in both open water swimming and pool swimming.

== Artistic swimming ==
Women

Athlete	Event	Preliminaries		Final	
Athlete	Event	Points	Rank	Points	Rank
Moe Higa; Mashiro Yasunaga	Duet technical routine	Did not start		Did not advance	

Mixed

Athlete	Event	Preliminaries		Final	
Athlete	Event	Points	Rank	Points	Rank
Moe Higa; Moeka Kijima; Uta Kobayashi; Tomoka Sato; Ayano Shimada; Ami Wada; Mashiro Yasunaga; Megumu Yoshida	Team technical routine	282.4379	2 Q	275.8787	3rd place, bronze medalist(s)
Moe Higa; Moeka Kijima; Uta Kobayashi; Tomoka Sato; Ami Wada; Akane Yanagisawa; Mashiro Yasunaga; Megumu Yoshida	Team free routine	319.4124	2 Q	315.2229	2nd place, silver medalist(s)
Moka Fujii; Moe Higa; Tomoka Sato; Ayano Shimada; Ami Wada; Akane Yanagisawa; Mashiro Yasunaga; Megumu Yoshida	Team acrobatic routine	209.8801	8 Q	206.7434	7

== Diving ==
Men

Athlete	Event	Preliminaries		Semifinals		Final	
Athlete	Event	Points	Rank	Points	Rank	Points	Rank
Kai Kaneto	1 m springboard	290.55	23	—		Did not advance	
Kai Kaneto	10 m platform	261.30	39	Did not advance			
Sho Sakai	3 m springboard	383.50	12 Q	393.25	8 Q	414.60	9
Haruki Suyama	3 m springboard	371.40	19	Did not advance			
Reo Nishida; Shuta Yamada	10 m synchro platform	—				319.98	16

Women

Athlete	Event	Preliminaries		Semifinals		Final	
Athlete	Event	Points	Rank	Points	Rank	Points	Rank
Matsuri Arai	10 m platform	253.20	23	Did not advance			
Haruka Enomoto	3 m springboard	258.50	14 Q	282.40	8 Q	265.20	11
Rin Kaneto	10 m platform	279.75	15 Q	271.10	13	Did not advance	
Sayaka Mikami	3 m springboard	279.45	7 Q	258.70	13	Did not advance	
Matsuri Arai; Minami Itahashi	10 m synchro platform	—				270.90	9

== Open water swimming ==
Men

Athlete	Event	Time	Rank
Kaiki Furuhata	Men's 10 km	1:53:58.5	45
Taishin Minamide	Men's 10 km	1:49:57.2	25

Women

Athlete	Event	Time	Rank
Airi Ebina	Women's 10 km	1:57:35.5	11
Ichika Kajimoto	Women's 10 km	1:58:17.4	21

== Swimming ==
Japan entered 12 swimmers.

Men

Athlete	Event	Heat		Semifinal		Final	
Athlete	Event	Time	Rank	Time	Rank	Time	Rank
Riki Abe	200 metre individual medley	1:59.48	4 Q	1:59.60	10	Did not advance	
Ikuru Hiroshima	200 metre breaststroke	2:10.73	3 Q	2:09.43	4 Q	2:09.37	5
Tomoru Honda	100 metre butterfly	Did not start		Did not advance			
Tomoru Honda	200 metre butterfly	1:56.56	9 Q	1:55.20	2 Q	1:53.88	1st place, gold medalist(s)
Tomoru Honda	400 metre individual medley	Did not start		—		Did not advance	
Nao Horomura	200 metre butterfly	1:57.52; 1:57.46	16 S/off; 2	Did not advance			
Osamu Kato	100 metre backstroke	54.70	22	Did not advance			
Osamu Kato	200 metre backstroke	1:58.82	13 Q	1:58.97	15	Did not advance	
Katsuhiro Matsumoto	200 metre freestyle	1:46.84	8 Q	1:46.53	10	Did not advance	
Katsuhiro Matsumoto	100 metre butterfly	51.60	2 Q	51.85	9	Did not advance	
Daiya Seto	200 metre individual medley	1:58.26	2 Q	1:57.85	4 Q	1:57.54	4
Daiya Seto	400 metre individual medley	4:13.06	3 Q	—		4:12.51	3rd place, bronze medalist(s)
Shinri Shioura	50 metre freestyle	22.22	22	Did not advance			
Shinri Shioura	50 metre butterfly	24.16	31	Did not advance			
Shogo Takeda	800 metre freestyle	7:57.54	25	—		Did not advance	
Shogo Takeda	1500 metre freestyle	15:04.50	14	—		Did not advance	
Osamu Kato; Ikuru Hiroshima; Nao Horomura; Riki Abe	4 × 100 m medley relay	3:39.91	20	—		Did not advance	

Women

Athlete	Event	Heat		Semifinal		Final	
Athlete	Event	Time	Rank	Time	Rank	Time	Rank
Chiharu Iitsuka	50 metre butterfly	26.85	24	Did not advance			
Chiharu Iitsuka	100 metre butterfly	58.35	7 Q	58.01	7 Q	58.23	8
Nagisa Ikemoto	50 metre freestyle	25.65	28	Did not advance			
Nagisa Ikemoto	100 metre freestyle	54.70	10 Q	54.76	13	Did not advance	
Nagisa Ikemoto	200 metre freestyle	2:00.11	21	Did not advance			
Nagisa Ikemoto	100 metre butterfly	58.73	11 Q	58.61	11	Did not advance	
Ichika Kajimoto	400 metre freestyle	4:09.65	10	—		Did not advance	
Ichika Kajimoto	800 metre freestyle	8:35.25	8 Q	—		8:29.24	6
Ichika Kajimoto	1500 metre freestyle	16:27.96	13	—		Did not advance	
Ichika Kajimoto	400 metre individual medley	4:42.85	6 Q	—		4:43.61	8

Mixed

Athlete	Event	Heat		Semifinal		Final	
Athlete	Event	Time	Rank	Time	Rank	Time	Rank
Osamu Kato; Ikuru Hiroshima; Chiharu Iitsuka; Nagisa Ikemoto	4 × 100 m medley relay	3:46.92	6	—		3:47.60	8

== Water polo ==
Summary

Team	Event	Group stage				Playoff	Quarterfinal	Semifinal	Final / BM	
Team	Event	Opposition Score	Opposition Score	Opposition Score	Rank	Opposition Score	Opposition Score	Opposition Score	Opposition Score	Rank
Japan	Men's tournament	Serbia; L 10–17	United States; L 5–18	Montenegro; L 11–13	4	—	—	Kazakhstan; W 17–4	Brazil; W 22–11	13

=== Men's tournament ===
Team roster

The following is the Japanese roster.

Head coach: Yoshinori Shiota

- 1 Katsuyuki Tanamura GK
- 2 Seiya Adachi FP
- 3 Taiyo Watanabe FP
- 4 Daichi Ogihara FP
- 5 Kai Inoue FP
- 6 Toi Suzuki FP
- 7 Kiyomu Date FP
- 8 Mitsuru Takata FP
- 9 Ikkei Nitta FP
- 10 Yusuke Inaba FP
- 11 Keigo Okawa FP
- 12 Kenta Araki FP
- 13 Towa Nishimura GK
- 14 Taiki Katayama FP
- 15 Ren Sasano FP

Group play

Pos	Team	Pld	W	PSW	PSL	L	GF	GA	GD	Pts	Qualification
1	Serbia	3	3	0	0	0	45	28	+17	9	Quarterfinals
2	Montenegro	3	1	1	0	1	30	36	−6	5	Playoffs
3	United States	3	1	0	1	1	41	30	+11	4	Playoffs
4	Japan	3	0	0	0	3	26	48	−22	0	13–16th place semifinals

Source: World Aquatics
Rules for classification: 1) points; 2) head-to-head points; 3) head-to-head goal difference; 4) head-to-head number of goals scored; 5) Goal difference.

5 February 2024; 16:00	Report	Japan	10–17	Serbia	Aspire Dome, Doha; Referees: Georgios Stavridis (GRE), Andrej Franulović (CRO)
5 February 2024; 16:00	Report	Score by quarters: 3–4, 4–4, 1–5, 2–4			Aspire Dome, Doha; Referees: Georgios Stavridis (GRE), Andrej Franulović (CRO)
5 February 2024; 16:00	Report	three players 2	Goals	Jakšić 4	Aspire Dome, Doha; Referees: Georgios Stavridis (GRE), Andrej Franulović (CRO)

7 February 2024; 12:00	Report	United States	18–5	Japan	Aspire Dome, Doha; Referees: Xavi Buch (ESP), Sébastien Dervieux (FRA)
7 February 2024; 12:00	Report	Score by quarters: 4–1, 4–0, 4–2, 6–2			Aspire Dome, Doha; Referees: Xavi Buch (ESP), Sébastien Dervieux (FRA)
7 February 2024; 12:00	Report	Hooper 6	Goals	Ogihara 2	Aspire Dome, Doha; Referees: Xavi Buch (ESP), Sébastien Dervieux (FRA)

9 February 2024; 09:00	Report	Montenegro	13–11	Japan	Aspire Dome, Doha; Referees: Michiel Zwart (NED), Frank Ohme (GER)
9 February 2024; 09:00	Report	Score by quarters: 3–2, 2–3, 4–0, 4–6			Aspire Dome, Doha; Referees: Michiel Zwart (NED), Frank Ohme (GER)
9 February 2024; 09:00	Report	Matković 4	Goals	Watanabe 5	Aspire Dome, Doha; Referees: Michiel Zwart (NED), Frank Ohme (GER)

13–16th place semifinals

11 February 2024; 10:30	Report	Japan	17–4	Kazakhstan	Aspire Dome, Doha; Referees: Natalia Markopoulou (GRE), Jennifer McCall (USA)
11 February 2024; 10:30	Report	Score by quarters: 3–2, 5–0, 5–2, 4–0			Aspire Dome, Doha; Referees: Natalia Markopoulou (GRE), Jennifer McCall (USA)
11 February 2024; 10:30	Report	Inaba 3	Goals	four players 1	Aspire Dome, Doha; Referees: Natalia Markopoulou (GRE), Jennifer McCall (USA)

13th place game

13 February 2024; 10:30	Report	Brazil	11–22	Japan	Aspire Dome, Doha; Referees: Zhang Liang (CHN), Nóra Debreceni (HUN)
13 February 2024; 10:30	Report	Score by quarters: 4–6, 2–5, 3–5, 2–6			Aspire Dome, Doha; Referees: Zhang Liang (CHN), Nóra Debreceni (HUN)
13 February 2024; 10:30	Report	R. Real 3	Goals	Inaba 7	Aspire Dome, Doha; Referees: Zhang Liang (CHN), Nóra Debreceni (HUN)
