= France at the 2024 World Aquatics Championships =

- Flag of France
- World Aquatics code: FRA
- National federation: French Swimming Federation
- Website: www.ffnatation.fr (in French)

in Doha, Qatar
- Competitors: 73 in 5 sports
- Medals Ranked 14th: Gold 1 Silver 4 Bronze 1 Total 6

World Aquatics Championships appearances
- 1973; 1975; 1978; 1982; 1986; 1991; 1994; 1998; 2001; 2003; 2005; 2007; 2009; 2011; 2013; 2015; 2017; 2019; 2022; 2023; 2024; 2025

France competed at the 2024 World Aquatics Championships in Doha, Qatar from 2 to 18 February.

== Medalists ==
| Medal | Name | Sport | Event | Date |
|---|---|---|---|---|
| 1st place, gold medalist(s) | Logan Fontaine | Open water swimming | Men's 5 km | 7 February 2024 |
| 2nd place, silver medalist(s) | Marc-Antoine Olivier | Open water swimming | Men's 10 km | 4 February 2024 |
| 2nd place, silver medalist(s) | Marc-Antoine Olivier | Open water swimming | Men's 5 km | 7 February 2024 |
| 2nd place, silver medalist(s) | Gary Hunt | High diving | Men | 15 February 2024 |
| 2nd place, silver medalist(s) | Mélanie Henique | Swimming | Women's 50 metre butterfly | 17 February 2024 |
| 3rd place, bronze medalist(s) | David Aubry | Swimming | Men's 1500 metre freestyle | 18 February 2024 |

== Competitors ==
The following is the list of competitors in the Championships.

| Sport | Men | Women | Total |
|---|---|---|---|
| Diving | 5* | 3 | 8* |
| High diving | 1* | 1 | 2* |
| Open water swimming | 2 | 2 | 4 |
| Swimming | 4* | 8 | 12* |
| Water polo | 15 | 15 | 30 |
| Total | 24* | 29 | 53* |

- Gary Hunt competed in both diving and high diving. Logan Fontaine and Marc-Antoine Olivier competed in both open water swimming and pool swimming.

== Diving ==
Men

| Athlete | Event | Preliminaries | | Semifinals | | Final | |
| Athlete | Event | Points | Rank | Points | Rank | Points | Rank |
|---|---|---|---|---|---|---|---|
| Gwendal Bisch | 1 m springboard | 330.10 | 12 Q | — | | 352.55 | 7 |
| Gwendal Bisch | 3 m springboard | 371.75 | 18 Q | 387.30 | 11 Q | 380.80 | 11 |
| Jules Bouyer | 1 m springboard | 321.35 | 14 | — | | Did not advance | |
| Jules Bouyer | 3 m springboard | 404.25 | 7 Q | 422.55 | 6 Q | 439.50 | 5 |
| Jules Bouyer; Alexis Jandard | 3 m synchro springboard | — | | | | 338.85 | 12 |
| Gary Hunt; Loïs Szymczak | 10 m synchro platform | — | | | | 295.83 | 19 |

Women

| Athlete | Event | Preliminaries | | Semifinals | | Final | |
| Athlete | Event | Points | Rank | Points | Rank | Points | Rank |
|---|---|---|---|---|---|---|---|
| Naïs Gillet | 1 m springboard | 229.40 | 14 | — | | Did not advance | |
| Naïs Gillet | 3 m springboard | 182.80 | 49 | Did not advance | | | |
| Jade Gillet | 10 m platform | 205.10 | 37 | Did not advance | | | |
| Jade Gillet; Naïs Gillet | 3 m synchro springboard | — | | | | 224.88 | 14 |
| Jade Gillet; Emily Halifax | 10 m synchro platform | — | | | | 231.60 | 14 |

Mixed

| Athlete | Event | Final | |
| Athlete | Event | Points | Rank |
|---|---|---|---|
| Gwendal Bisch; Naïs Gillet | 3 m synchro springboard | 260.85 | 8 |

== High diving ==
| Athlete | Event | Points | Rank |
|---|---|---|---|
| Gary Hunt | Men's high diving | 413.25 | 2nd place, silver medalist(s) |
| Madeleine Bayon | Women's high diving | 208.85 | 14 |

== Open water swimming ==
Men

| Athlete | Event | Time | Rank |
|---|---|---|---|
| Logan Fontaine | Men's 5 km | 51:29.3 | 1st place, gold medalist(s) |
| Logan Fontaine | Men's 10 km | 1:48:29.5 | 4 |
| Marc-Antoine Olivier | Men's 5 km | 51:29.6 | 2nd place, silver medalist(s) |
| Marc-Antoine Olivier | Men's 10 km | 1:48:23.6 | 2nd place, silver medalist(s) |

Women

| Athlete | Event | Time | Rank |
|---|---|---|---|
| Océane Cassignol | Women's 5 km | 57:38.9 | 5 |
| Océane Cassignol | Women's 10 km | 1:57:34.9 | 10 |
| Caroline Jouisse | Women's 5 km | 57:51.5 | 8 |
| Caroline Jouisse | Women's 10 km | 1:57:32.3 | 7 |

Mixed

| Athlete | Event | Time | Rank |
|---|---|---|---|
| Océane Cassignol; Logan Fontaine; Caroline Jouisse; Marc-Antoine Olivier | Team relay | 1:05:05.5 | 6 |

== Swimming ==
France entered 12 swimmers.

Men

| Athlete | Event | Heat | | Semifinal | | Final | |
| Athlete | Event | Time | Rank | Time | Rank | Time | Rank |
|---|---|---|---|---|---|---|---|
| David Aubry | 400 metre freestyle | 3:46.40 | 9 | — | | Did not advance | |
| David Aubry | 1500 metre freestyle | 14:49.01 | 2 Q | — | | 14:44.85 | 3rd place, bronze medalist(s) |
| Logan Fontaine | 400 metre freestyle | 3:55.60 | 35 | — | | Did not advance | |
| Damien Joly | 800 metre freestyle | 7:53.42 | 20 | — | | Did not advance | |
| Damien Joly | 1500 metre freestyle | 15:05.76 | 16 | — | | Did not advance | |
| Marc-Antoine Olivier | 800 metre freestyle | 8:08.54 | 33 | — | | Did not advance | |

Women

| Athlete | Event | Heat | | Semifinal | | Final | |
| Athlete | Event | Time | Rank | Time | Rank | Time | Rank |
|---|---|---|---|---|---|---|---|
| Charlotte Bonnet | 100 metre freestyle | 55.12 | 14 Q | 54.72 | 12 | Did not advance | |
| Charlotte Bonnet | 50 metre breaststroke | Did not start | | Did not advance | | | |
| Charlotte Bonnet | 200 metre individual medley | 2:12.32 | 6 Q | 2:10.24 | 5 Q | 2:11.23 | 7 |
| Cyrielle Duhamel | 200 metre individual medley | 2:15.24 | 15 Q | 2:13.93 | 14 | Did not advance | |
| Cyrielle Duhamel | 400 metre individual medley | 4:42.68 | 4 Q | — | | 4:41.95 | 6 |
| Melanie Henique | 50 metre freestyle | 24.85 | 8 Q | 24.74 | 9 | Did not advance | |
| Melanie Henique | 50 metre butterfly | 25.44 | 2 Q | 25.27 | 2 Q | 25.44 | 2nd place, silver medalist(s) |
| Anastasiya Kirpichnikova | 400 metre freestyle | 4:13.95 | 15 | — | | Did not advance | |
| Anastasiya Kirpichnikova | 800 metre freestyle | Did not start | | — | | Did not advance | |
| Anastasiya Kirpichnikova | 1500 metre freestyle | 16:14.76 | 5 Q | — | | 16:12.98 | 5 |
| Lucile Tessariol; Assia Touati; Océane Carnez; Giulia Rossi-Bene | 4 × 200 metre freestyle relay | 7:59.27 | 9 | — | | Did not advance | |

== Water polo ==
Summary

| Team | Event | Group stage | | | | Playoff | Quarterfinal | Semifinal | Final / BM | |
| Team | Event | Opposition Score | Opposition Score | Opposition Score | Rank | Opposition Score | Opposition Score | Opposition Score | Opposition Score | Rank |
|---|---|---|---|---|---|---|---|---|---|---|
| France | Men's tournament | Brazil; W 16–11 | China; W 16–9 | Greece; L 12-13 | 2 QP | Australia; W 11–8 | Hungary; W 11–10 | Croatia; L 16–17 | Spain; L 10–14 | 4 |
| France | Women's tournament | Greece; L 6–11 | China; L 10–11 | Spain; L 7–14 | 4 | — | — | Brazil; W 17–8 | South Africa; W 19-8 | 13 |

=== Men's tournament ===
Team roster

The following is the French roster.

Head coach: Florian Bruzzo

- 1 Clément Dubois GK
- 2 Rémi Saudadier FP
- 3 Ugo Crousillat FP
- 4 Alexandre Bouet FP
- 5 Enzo Khasz FP
- 6 Thomas Vernoux FP
- 7 Romain Marion-Vernoux FP
- 8 Emil Bjorch FP
- 9 Duje Živković FP
- 10 Michaël Bodegas FP
- 11 Pierre-Frédéric Vanpeperstraete FP
- 12 Andrea De Nardi FP
- 13 Hugo Fontani GK
- 14 Charles Canonne FP
- 15 Enzo Nardon FP

Group play

| Pos | Team | Pld | W | PSW | PSL | L | GF | GA | GD | Pts | Qualification |
|---|---|---|---|---|---|---|---|---|---|---|---|
| 1 | Greece | 3 | 3 | 0 | 0 | 0 | 60 | 22 | +38 | 9 | Quarterfinals |
| 2 | France | 3 | 2 | 0 | 0 | 1 | 44 | 33 | +11 | 6 | Playoffs |
| 3 | China | 3 | 1 | 0 | 0 | 2 | 25 | 48 | −23 | 3 | Playoffs |
| 4 | Brazil | 3 | 0 | 0 | 0 | 3 | 23 | 49 | −26 | 0 | 13–16th place semifinals |

Source: World Aquatics
Rules for classification: 1) points; 2) head-to-head points; 3) head-to-head goal difference; 4) head-to-head number of goals scored; 5) Goal difference.

| 5 February 2024; 12:00 | Report | Brazil | 11–16 | France | Aspire Dome, Doha; Referees: Darren Spiritosanto (USA), Andreia Stanojević (SRB) |
| 5 February 2024; 12:00 | Report | Score by quarters: 1–3, 4–5, 3–4, 3–4 | | | Aspire Dome, Doha; Referees: Darren Spiritosanto (USA), Andreia Stanojević (SRB) |
| 5 February 2024; 12:00 | Report | R. Real 5 | Goals | Vernoux 6 | Aspire Dome, Doha; Referees: Darren Spiritosanto (USA), Andreia Stanojević (SRB) |

| 7 February 2024; 09:00 | Report | France | 16–9 | China | Aspire Dome, Doha; Referees: Stanko Ivanovski (MNE), Andreia Stanojević (SRB) |
| 7 February 2024; 09:00 | Report | Score by quarters: 3–3, 4–2, 2–1, 7–3 | | | Aspire Dome, Doha; Referees: Stanko Ivanovski (MNE), Andreia Stanojević (SRB) |
| 7 February 2024; 09:00 | Report | Vernoux 6 | Goals | Chen Z. 3 | Aspire Dome, Doha; Referees: Stanko Ivanovski (MNE), Andreia Stanojević (SRB) |

| 9 February 2024; 19:00 | Report | Greece | 13–12 | France | Aspire Dome, Doha; Referees: Andrej Franulović (CRO), Zhang Liang (CHN) |
| 9 February 2024; 19:00 | Report | Score by quarters: 3–3, 4–3, 3–2, 3–4 | | | Aspire Dome, Doha; Referees: Andrej Franulović (CRO), Zhang Liang (CHN) |
| 9 February 2024; 19:00 | Report | four players 2 | Goals | Marion-Vernoux 4 | Aspire Dome, Doha; Referees: Andrej Franulović (CRO), Zhang Liang (CHN) |

Playoffs

| 11 February 2024; 16:00 | Report | Australia | 8–11 | France | Aspire Dome, Doha; Referees: Frank Ohme (GER), Andreia Stanojević (SRB) |
| 11 February 2024; 16:00 | Report | Score by quarters: 3–2, 3–4, 1–2, 1–3 | | | Aspire Dome, Doha; Referees: Frank Ohme (GER), Andreia Stanojević (SRB) |
| 11 February 2024; 16:00 | Report | Maksimović 2 | Goals | Bouet 4 | Aspire Dome, Doha; Referees: Frank Ohme (GER), Andreia Stanojević (SRB) |

Quarterfinals

| 13 February 2024; 20:30 | Report | Hungary | 10–11 | France | Aspire Dome, Doha; Referees: Xavi Buch (ESP), Darren Spiritosanto (USA) |
| 13 February 2024; 20:30 | Report | Score by quarters: 4–2, 3–1, 1–3, 2–5 | | | Aspire Dome, Doha; Referees: Xavi Buch (ESP), Darren Spiritosanto (USA) |
| 13 February 2024; 20:30 | Report | Zalánki 3 | Goals | Vernoux 5 | Aspire Dome, Doha; Referees: Xavi Buch (ESP), Darren Spiritosanto (USA) |

Semifinals

| 15 February 2024; 17:30 | Report | Croatia | 17–16 | France | Aspire Dome, Doha; Referees: Michiel Zwart (NED), Zhang Liang (CHN) |
| 15 February 2024; 17:30 | Report | Score by quarters: 3–2, 3–3, 3–1, 2–5 PSO: 6–5 | | | Aspire Dome, Doha; Referees: Michiel Zwart (NED), Zhang Liang (CHN) |
| 15 February 2024; 17:30 | Report | Fatović 3 | Goals | Bouet 3 | Aspire Dome, Doha; Referees: Michiel Zwart (NED), Zhang Liang (CHN) |

Third place game

| 17 February 2024; 11:30 | Report | Spain | 14–10 | France | Aspire Dome, Doha; Referees: György Kun (HUN), Darren Spiritosanto (USA) |
| 17 February 2024; 11:30 | Report | Score by quarters: 4–1, 5–3, 2–2, 3–4 | | | Aspire Dome, Doha; Referees: György Kun (HUN), Darren Spiritosanto (USA) |
| 17 February 2024; 11:30 | Report | Granados, Sanahuja 4 | Goals | three players 2 | Aspire Dome, Doha; Referees: György Kun (HUN), Darren Spiritosanto (USA) |

=== Women's tournament ===
Team roster

The following is French roster.

Head coach: (France) Theodoros Lorantos

- 1 Mia Rycraw GK
- 2 Lara Andres D
- 3 Valentine Heurtaux CB
- 4 Camelia Bouloukbachi FP
- 5 Louise Guillet D
- 6 Orsolya Hertzka D
- 7 Juliette Dhalluin D
- 8 Aurelie Battu CF
- 9 Ema Vernoux FP
- 10 Camille Radosavljevic FP
- 11 Tiziana Raspo FP
- 12 Audrey Daule D
- 13 Pasiphaé Martineaud Peret GK
- 14 Erica Hardy FP
- 15 Lily Vernoux FP

Group play

| Pos | Team | Pld | W | PSW | PSL | L | GF | GA | GD | Pts | Qualification |
|---|---|---|---|---|---|---|---|---|---|---|---|
| 1 | Spain | 3 | 3 | 0 | 0 | 0 | 48 | 20 | +28 | 9 | Quarterfinals |
| 2 | Greece | 3 | 2 | 0 | 0 | 1 | 41 | 31 | +10 | 6 | Playoffs |
| 3 | China | 3 | 0 | 1 | 0 | 2 | 20 | 46 | −26 | 2 | Playoffs |
| 4 | France | 3 | 0 | 0 | 1 | 2 | 19 | 31 | −12 | 1 | 13–16th place semifinals |

Source: World Aquatics
Rules for classification: 1) points; 2) head-to-head points; 3) head-to-head goal difference; 4) head-to-head number of goals scored; 5) Goal difference.

| 4 February 2024; 12:00 | Report | Greece | 11–6 | France | Aspire Dome, Doha; Referees: Frank Ohme (GER), Andrej Franulović (CRO) |
| 4 February 2024; 12:00 | Report | Score by quarters: 3–2, 2–1, 4–2, 2–1 | | | Aspire Dome, Doha; Referees: Frank Ohme (GER), Andrej Franulović (CRO) |
| 4 February 2024; 12:00 | Report | Plevritou 3 | Goals | Guillet 2 | Aspire Dome, Doha; Referees: Frank Ohme (GER), Andrej Franulović (CRO) |

| 6 February 2024; 09:00 | Report | France | 10–11 | China | Aspire Dome, Doha; Referees: Nóra Debreceni (HUN), Helen Painchaud (CAN) |
| 6 February 2024; 09:00 | Report | Score by quarters: 0–2, 2–1, 3–3, 1–0 PSO: 4–5 | | | Aspire Dome, Doha; Referees: Nóra Debreceni (HUN), Helen Painchaud (CAN) |
| 6 February 2024; 09:00 | Report | Battu, Bouloukbakchi 2 | Goals | Zhang J. 5 | Aspire Dome, Doha; Referees: Nóra Debreceni (HUN), Helen Painchaud (CAN) |

| 8 February 2024; 19:00 | Report | Spain | 14–7 | France | Aspire Dome, Doha; Referees: Hélène Painchaud (CAN), Darren Spiritosanto (USA) |
| 8 February 2024; 19:00 | Report | Score by quarters: 2–0, 5–4, 4–1, 3–2 | | | Aspire Dome, Doha; Referees: Hélène Painchaud (CAN), Darren Spiritosanto (USA) |
| 8 February 2024; 19:00 | Report | Nogué 3 | Goals | Bouloukbakchi, Vernoux 2 | Aspire Dome, Doha; Referees: Hélène Painchaud (CAN), Darren Spiritosanto (USA) |

13–16th place semifinals

| 10 February 2024; 09:00 | Report | Brazil | 8–17 | France | Aspire Dome, Doha; Referees: Hélène Painchaud (CAN), Asumi Tsuzaki (JPN) |
| 10 February 2024; 09:00 | Report | Score by quarters: 1–4, 1–3, 2–5, 4–5 | | | Aspire Dome, Doha; Referees: Hélène Painchaud (CAN), Asumi Tsuzaki (JPN) |
| 10 February 2024; 09:00 | Report | Belorio 4 | Goals | Hertzka, Vernoux 4 | Aspire Dome, Doha; Referees: Hélène Painchaud (CAN), Asumi Tsuzaki (JPN) |

13th place game

| 12 February 2024; 10:30 | Report | France | 19–8 | South Africa | Aspire Dome, Doha; Referees: Yuri Maciel (BRA), Cheng Beng Guan (SGP) |
| 12 February 2024; 10:30 | Report | Score by quarters: 5–0, 5–3, 6–3, 3–2 | | | Aspire Dome, Doha; Referees: Yuri Maciel (BRA), Cheng Beng Guan (SGP) |
| 12 February 2024; 10:30 | Report | Vernoux 5 | Goals | Geber, Versfeld 2 | Aspire Dome, Doha; Referees: Yuri Maciel (BRA), Cheng Beng Guan (SGP) |
