= High diving at the 2024 World Aquatics Championships =

- Host city: Doha, Qatar
- Date(s): 13–15 February
- Venue(s): Old Doha Port
- Events: 2

High diving at the 2024 World Aquatics Championships was held from 13 to 15 February 2024 at the old Doha Port in Doha, Qatar.

== Schedule ==
Two events were held.

All times are local (UTC+3).

Date	Time	Event
13 February 2024	11:00	Women Rounds 1–2
13 February 2024	14:00	Men Rounds 1–2
14 February 2024	11:00	Women Rounds 3–4
15 February 2024	11:00	Men Rounds 3–4

== Medal summary ==
=== Medal table ===
* Host nation (Qatar)

Rank	Nation	Gold	Silver	Bronze	Total
1	Australia	1	0	0	1
1	Great Britain	1	0	0	1
3	Canada	0	1	1	2
4	France	0	1	0	1
5	Romania	0	0	1	1
Totals (5 entries)		2	2	2	6

Source: Worldaquatics

=== Medal events ===
Event	Gold		Silver		Bronze	
Men	Aidan Heslop; Great Britain	422.95	Gary Hunt; France	413.25	Cătălin Preda; Romania	410.20
Women	Rhiannan Iffland; Australia	342.00	Molly Carlson; Canada	320.70	Jessica Macaulay; Canada	320.35
