= Germany at the 2024 World Aquatics Championships =

- Flag of Germany
- FINA code: GER
- National federation: Deutscher Schwimmverband
- Website: www.dsv.de

in Doha, Qatar
- Competitors: 36 in 5 sports
- Medals Ranked 15th: Gold 1 Silver 2 Bronze 3 Total 6

World Aquatics Championships appearances
- 1991; 1994; 1998; 2001; 2003; 2005; 2007; 2009; 2011; 2013; 2015; 2017; 2019; 2022; 2023; 2024

Other related appearances
- East Germany (1973–1986); West Germany (1973–1986)

Germany competed at the 2024 World Aquatics Championships in Doha, Qatar from 2 to 18 February.

== Medalists ==
Medal	Name	Sport	Event	Date
1st place, gold medalist(s)	Angelina Köhler	Swimming	Women's 100 metre butterfly	12 February 2024
2nd place, silver medalist(s)	Isabel Gose	Swimming	Women's 800 metre freestyle	17 February 2024
2nd place, silver medalist(s)	Florian Wellbrock	Swimming	Men's 1500 metre freestyle	18 February 2024
3rd place, bronze medalist(s)	Lukas Märtens	Swimming	Men's 400 metre freestyle	11 February 2024
3rd place, bronze medalist(s)	Isabel Gose	Swimming	Women's 400 metre freestyle	11 February 2024
3rd place, bronze medalist(s)	Isabel Gose	Swimming	Women's 1500 metre freestyle	13 February 2024

== Athletes by discipline ==
The following is the list of number of competitors participating at the Championships per discipline.

Sport	Men	Women	Total
Artistic swimming	0	3	3
Diving	7	7	14
High diving	2	3	5
Open water swimming	3*	3	6*
Swimming	7*	2	9*
Total	18	18	36

- Florian Wellbrock competed in both open water swimming and indoor swimming.

== Artistic swimming ==
Women

Athlete	Event	Preliminaries		Final	
Athlete	Event	Points	Rank	Points	Rank
Klara Bleyer	Solo technical routine	231.8401	9 Q	237.1333	5
Klara Bleyer	Solo free routine	206.9958	10 Q	230.8894	5
Johanna Bleyer; Klara Bleyer	Duet technical routine	204.9199	22	Did not advance	
Klara Bleyer; Susana Rovner	Duet free routine	186.8874	15	Did not advance	

== Diving ==
Men

Athlete	Event	Preliminaries		Semifinals		Final	
Athlete	Event	Points	Rank	Points	Rank	Points	Rank
Lars Rüdiger	1 m springboard	328.55	13	—		Did not advance	
Alexander Lube	3 m springboard	387.05	10 Q	335.45	18	Did not advance	
Moritz Wesemann	3 m springboard	412.45	5 Q	392.50	10 Q	433.75	7
Luis Avila Sanchez	10 m platform	272.20	38	Did not advance			
Jaden Eikermann	10 m platform	351.60	24	Did not advance			
Alexander Lube; Moritz Wesemann	Synchronized 3 m springboard	—				328.62	16
Timo Barthel; Jaden Eikermann	Synchronized 10 m platform	—				373.71	7

Women

Athlete	Event	Preliminaries		Semifinals		Final	
Athlete	Event	Points	Rank	Points	Rank	Points	Rank
Jette Müller	1 m springboard	236.95	8 Q	—		253.70	4
Saskia Oettinghaus	1 m springboard	203.90	28	—		Did not advance	
Lena Hentschel	3 m springboard	267.45	12 Q	282.15	9 Q	289.95	6
Saskia Oettinghaus	3 m springboard	268.65	11 Q	241.35	15	Did not advance	
Pauline Pfeif	10 m platform	267.90	17 Q	278.20	10 Q	277.60	10
Christina Wassen	10 m platform	295.70	10 Q	266.40	14	Did not advance	
Lena Hentschel; Jette Müller	Synchronized 3 m springboard	—				273.93	6
Christina Wassen; Elena Wassen	Synchronized 10 m platform	—				277.98	7

Mixed

Athlete	Event	Final	
Athlete	Event	Points	Rank
Alexander Lube; Jana Rother	Synchronized 3 m springboard	257.64	9
Tom Waldsteiner; Elena Wassen	Synchronized 10 m platform	291.42	5
Timo Barthel; Lena Hentschel; Elena Wassen; Moritz Wesemann	Team event	362.05	4

== High diving ==
Athlete	Event	Points	Rank
Manuel Halbisch	Men	218.30	22
Tim Thesing	Men	WD	
Anna Bader	Women	291.80	6
Maike Halbisch	Women	196.35	15
Iris Schmidbauer	Women	WD	

== Open water swimming ==
Men

Athlete	Event	Time	Rank
Oliver Klemet	Men's 5 km	51:36.4	8
Oliver Klemet	Men's 10 km	1:48:32.3	11
Florian Wellbrock	Men's 5 km	51:36.7	9
Florian Wellbrock	Men's 10 km	1:49:59.0	29

Women

Athlete	Event	Time	Rank
Leonie Beck	Women's 5 km	57:56.6	14
Leonie Beck	Women's 10 km	1:58:11.8	20
Jeannette Spiwoks	Women's 5 km	58:03.3	16
Jeannette Spiwoks	Women's 10 km	1:57:46.0	16

Mixed

Athlete	Event	Time	Rank
Leonie Beck; Oliver Klemet; Celine Rieder; Arne Schubert	Team relay	1:04:11.6	4

== Swimming ==
Men

Athlete	Event	Heat		Semifinal		Final	
Athlete	Event	Time	Rank	Time	Rank	Time	Rank
Ole Braunschweig	50 metre backstroke	24.94	8 Q	24.74	8 Q	24.74	5
Ole Braunschweig	100 metre backstroke	54.10	12 Q	53.89	11	Did not advance	
Melvin Imoudu	50 metre breaststroke	26.91	6 Q	27.06	9	Did not advance	
Melvin Imoudu	100 metre breaststroke	59.72	8 Q	1:00.08	14	Did not advance	
Lukas Märtens	200 metre freestyle	1:45.74	1 Q	1:45.21	3 Q	1:45.33	4
Lukas Märtens	400 metre freestyle	3:44.77	2 Q	—		3:42.96	3rd place, bronze medalist(s)
Lukas Märtens	200 metre backstroke	1:58.45	10 Q	1:58.24	13	Did not advance	
Lucas Matzerath	50 metre breaststroke	27.40	13 Q	27.01	6 Q	26.80	5
Lucas Matzerath	100 metre breaststroke	59.43	5 Q	59.30	5 Q	59.37	7
Rafael Miroslaw	200 metre freestyle	1:45.89	2 Q	1:45.95	6 Q	1:45.84	5
Sven Schwarz	400 metre freestyle	3:47.82	16	—		Did not advance	
Sven Schwarz	800 metre freestyle	7:46.95	3 Q	—		7:44.29	4
Sven Schwarz	1500 metre freestyle	14:53.08	5 Q	—		14:47.89	6
Florian Wellbrock	800 metre freestyle	7:48.17	10	—		Did not advance	
Florian Wellbrock	1500 metre freestyle	14:48.43	1 Q	—		14:44.61	2nd place, silver medalist(s)

Women

Athlete	Event	Heat		Semifinal		Final	
Athlete	Event	Time	Rank	Time	Rank	Time	Rank
Isabel Gose	400 metre freestyle	4:05.48	3 Q	—		4:02.39 NR	3rd place, bronze medalist(s)
Isabel Gose	800 metre freestyle	8:26.49	1 Q	—		8:17.53	2nd place, silver medalist(s)
Isabel Gose	1500 metre freestyle	16:10.60	2 Q	—		15:57.55	3rd place, bronze medalist(s)
Angelina Köhler	50 metre freestyle	25.47	20	Did not advance			
Angelina Köhler	50 metre butterfly	25.92	6 Q	25.98	8 Q	25.71	5
Angelina Köhler	100 metre butterfly	56.41 NR	1 Q	56.11 NR	1 Q	56.28	1st place, gold medalist(s)
