= Swimming at the 2024 World Aquatics Championships – Women's 50 metre butterfly =

Women's 50 metre butterfly at the Swimming at the 2024 World Aquatics Championships
- Venue: Aspire Dome
- Location: Doha, Qatar
- Dates: 16 February (heats and semifinals); 17 February (final)
- Competitors: 58 from 54 nations
- Winning time: 24.63

Medalists
gold medal	Sarah Sjöström	Sweden
silver medal	Melanie Henique	France
bronze medal	Farida Osman	Egypt

The Women's 50 metre butterfly competition at the 2024 World Aquatics Championships was held on 16 and 17 February 2024.

== Qualification ==
Each National Federation was permitted to enter a maximum of two qualified athletes in each individual event, but only if both of them had attained the "A" standard qualification time at approved qualifying events. For this event, the "A" standard qualification time was 26.32 seconds. Federations could enter one athlete into the event if they met the "B" standard qualification time. For this event, the "B" standard qualification time was 27.24. Athletes could also enter the event if they had met an "A" or "B" standard in a different event and their Federation had not entered anyone else. Additional considerations applied to Federations who had few swimmers enter through the standard qualification times. Federations in this category could at least enter two men and two women into the competition, all of whom could enter into up to two events.

== Records ==
Prior to the competition, the existing world and championship records were as follows.

World record	Sarah Sjöström (SWE)	24.43	Borås, Sweden	5 July 2014
Competition record	Sarah Sjöström (SWE)	24.60	Budapest, Hungary	29 July 2017

== Results ==
=== Heats ===
The heats were started on 16 February at 10:33.

Rank	Heat	Lane	Name	Nationality	Time	Notes
1	7	4	Sarah Sjöström	Sweden	24.88	Q
2	6	4	Melanie Henique	France	25.44	Q
3	6	5	Erin Gallagher	South Africa	25.69	Q
4	5	4	Farida Osman	Egypt	25.88	Q
5	7	6	Alexandria Perkins	Australia	25.89	Q
6	7	3	Angelina Köhler	Germany	25.92	Q
7	5	7	Kim Busch	Netherlands	25.93	Q
8	6	6	Louise Hansson	Sweden	25.98	Q
9	6	2	Brianna Throssell	Australia	26.04	Q
10	5	2	Yu Yiting	China	26.06	Q
11	6	3	Neža Klančar	Slovenia	26.07	Q
12	7	5	Maaike de Waard	Netherlands	26.13	Q
13	5	3	Anna Ntountounaki	Greece	26.26	Q
14	4	6	Anastasiya Kuliashova	Neutral Independent Athletes	26.32	Q
15	7	7	Sofia Spodarenko	Kazakhstan	26.38	Q
16	6	7	Paulina Peda	Poland	26.44	
17	5	6	Roos Vanotterdijk	Belgium	26.47	
17	7	2	Katerine Savard	Canada	26.47	
19	4	5	Lismar Lyon	Venezuela	26.57	
20	6	1	Julia Maik	Poland	26.75	
21	6	8	Quah Ting Wen	Singapore	26.78	
22	6	0	Jenjira Srisaard	Thailand	26.84	
22	7	1	Sonia Laquintana	Italy	26.84	
24	5	8	Chiharu Iitsuka	Japan	26.85	
25	4	2	Emma Harvey	Bermuda	26.88	NR
26	7	9	Huang Mei-chien	Chinese Taipei	27.07	
27	7	8	Tam Hoi Lam	Hong Kong	27.09	
28	7	0	Tayde Sansores	Mexico	27.18	
29	5	9	Sirena Rowe	Colombia	27.29	
30	4	3	Jasmine Alkhaldi	Philippines	27.32	
31	4	1	Amel Melih	Algeria	27.34	
32	5	0	Jessica Calderbank	Jamaica	27.47	
33	4	4	Marina Spadoni	El Salvador	27.64	
34	4	7	Gabriela Ņikitina	Latvia	27.87	
35	4	8	Luana Alonso	Paraguay	28.06	
36	4	0	Jóhanna Elin Guðmundsdóttir	Iceland	28.19	
37	4	9	Imara Thorpe	Kenya	28.34	
38	3	5	Adaku Nwandu	Nigeria	28.87	
39	3	6	Cheang Weng Chi	Macau	29.03	
40	3	3	Victoria Russell	Bahamas	29.16	
41	3	4	Cherelle Thompson	Trinidad and Tobago	29.58	
42	1	3	Kirabo Namutebi	Uganda	29.62	
43	2	2	Mia Laban	Cook Islands	30.08	
44	3	2	Naekeisha Louis	Saint Lucia	30.44	
45	3	1	Ekaterina Bordachyova	Tajikistan	30.65	NR
46	2	1	Denise Donelli	Mozambique	30.69	
47	3	7	Mira Al-Shehhi	United Arab Emirates	30.82	
48	3	8	Taffi Illis	Sint Maarten	31.37	
49	2	8	Rana Saadeldin	Sudan	32.03	
50	3	0	Arleigha Hall	Turks and Caicos Islands	32.94	
51	2	6	Amylia Chali	Tanzania	33.14	
52	2	5	Galyah Mikel	Palau	35.60	
53	3	9	Jessica Makwenda	Malawi	35.65	
54	1	4	Grâce Nguelo'o	Cameroon	35.96	
55	2	7	Neema Nyirabyenda	Rwanda	36.27	
56	2	4	Lina Selo	Ethiopia	36.34	
57	2	3	Daknishael Sanon	Haiti	36.94	
	5	1	Tamara Potocká	Slovakia	Disqualified	
	1	5	Hearmela Melke	Eritrea	Did not start	
	2	0	Yaba Kamara	Sierra Leone	Did not start	
	5	5	Claire Curzan	United States	Did not start	
	6	9	Barbora Seemanová	Czech Republic	Did not start	

=== Semifinals ===
The semifinals were held on 16 February at 20:17.

Rank	Heat	Lane	Name	Nationality	Time	Notes
1	2	4	Sarah Sjöström	Sweden	25.08	Q
2	1	4	Melanie Henique	France	25.27	Q
3	1	5	Farida Osman	Egypt	25.80	Q
4	1	2	Yu Yiting	China	25.81	Q-->WD
4	2	3	Alexandria Perkins	Australia	25.81	Q
6	2	5	Erin Gallagher	South Africa	25.86	Q
7	2	2	Brianna Throssell	Australia	25.97	Q
8	1	3	Angelina Köhler	Germany	25.98	SO
8	2	1	Anna Ntountounaki	Greece	25.98	SO
10	1	6	Louise Hansson	Sweden	26.01	
11	1	7	Maaike de Waard	Netherlands	26.05	
12	2	7	Neža Klančar	Slovenia	26.08	
13	2	6	Kim Busch	Netherlands	26.25	
14	1	8	Paulina Peda	Poland	26.44	
15	2	8	Sofia Spodarenko	Kazakhstan	26.46	
16	1	1	Anastasiya Kuliashova	Neutral Independent Athletes	26.57	

==== Swim-off ====
The swim-off was held on 16 February at 21:10.

Rank	Lane	Name	Nationality	Time	Notes
1	4	Angelina Köhler	Germany	25.79	Q
2	5	Anna Ntountounaki	Greece	25.97	Q

=== Final ===
The final was held on 17 February at 19:02.

Rank	Lane	Name	Nationality	Time	Notes
1st place, gold medalist(s)	4	Sarah Sjöström	Sweden	24.63	
2nd place, silver medalist(s)	5	Melanie Henique	France	25.44	
3rd place, bronze medalist(s)	3	Farida Osman	Egypt	25.67	
4	7	Erin Gallagher	South Africa	25.69	
5	8	Angelina Köhler	Germany	25.71	
6	2	Alexandria Perkins	Australia	25.85	
7	6	Anna Ntountounaki	Greece	25.89	
8	1	Brianna Throssell	Australia	25.96	

== Sources ==
- "Competition Regulations" (PDF). World Aquatics. Archived (PDF) from the original on 15 February 2026.
