= Water polo at the 2024 World Aquatics Championships – Women's tournament =

Tournament details
- Host country: Qatar
- Venue: Aspire Dome (in Doha host cities)
- Dates: 4–16 February
- Teams: 16 (from 5 confederations)

Final positions
- Champions: United States (8th title)
- Runners-up: Hungary
- Third place: Spain
- Fourth place: Greece

Tournament statistics
- Matches played: 48
- Goals scored: 1,163 (24.23 per match)
- Top scorers: (New Zealand) Morgan McDowall (31 goals)

Awards
- Best player: (Hungary) Rita Keszthelyi
- Best goalkeeper: (United States) Ashleigh Johnson

The women's water polo tournament at the 2024 World Aquatics Championships was held from 4 to 16 February 2024 in Doha. This was the 17th time that the women's water polo tournament has been played since the first edition in 1986.

The United States won their eighth overall title.

== Qualification ==
Of the qualified teams, thirteen returned from 2023. Singapore qualified for the first time ever after Japan withdrew for financial reasons, becoming the second country from Southeast Asia to qualify for this event after Thailand in 2022. Great Britain qualified after an eleven-year absence, and Brazil qualified again after withdrawing from 2023. Argentina, Israel and Japan were the only teams that failed to make this edition but made 2023.

As of 2025, this was the last time Brazil and Canada qualified and the last time Argentina, Croatia and Japan failed to qualify.

Event	Dates	Hosts	Quota	Qualifier(s)
2023 World Cup	11 April – 25 June 2023	(United States) Long Beach	2	United States; Netherlands
2023 World Championships	16–28 July 2023	(Japan) Fukuoka	4	Spain; Italy; Australia; Hungary
2022 Asian Games	25 September – 1 October 2023	(China) Hangzhou	3	China; ~~Japan~~; Kazakhstan; Singapore
2023 Pan American Games	30 October – 4 November 2023	(Chile) Santiago	2	Canada; Brazil
2024 European Championship	5–13 January 2024	(Netherlands) Eindhoven	3	Greece; France; Great Britain
African selection	—N/a	—N/a	1	South Africa
Oceanian selection	—N/a	—N/a	1	New Zealand
Total			16	

- Due a limited budget Japan was forced to withdraw from tournament and was replaced by Singapore.

== Schedule ==
All times are local (UTC+3).

Date	Time	Round
4 February 2024	09:00	Preliminary round
6 February 2024	09:00	Preliminary round
8 February 2024	09:00	Preliminary round
10 February 2024	09:00	Play-offs/Placement matches
12 February 2024	09:00	Quarterfinals/Placement matches
14 February 2024	09:00	Semifinals/Placement matches
16 February 2024	10:00	Finals

== Draw ==
The draw was held on 7 November 2023.

=== Seeding ===
Pot 1	Pot 2	Pot 3	Pot 4
Netherlands; Spain; Italy; Australia	United States; Hungary; Greece (Note: Team known as Europe 1 at the time of the draw.); Canada	France (Note: Team known as Europe 2 at the time of the draw.); Great Britain (Note: Team known as Europe 3 at the time of the draw.); Brazil; New Zealand	China; Kazakhstan; Singapore; South Africa

== Preliminary round ==
All times are local (UTC+3).

=== Group A ===
Pos	Team	Pld	W	PSW	PSL	L	GF	GA	GD	Pts	Qualification
1	United States	3	3	0	0	0	63	16	+47	9	Quarterfinals
2	Netherlands	3	2	0	0	1	62	19	+43	6	Playoffs
3	Kazakhstan	3	0	1	0	2	17	69	−52	2	Playoffs
4	Brazil	3	0	0	1	2	20	58	−38	1	13–16th place semifinals

Source: World Aquatics
Rules for classification: 1) points; 2) head-to-head points; 3) head-to-head goal difference; 4) head-to-head number of goals scored; 5) Goal difference.

4 February 2024; 09:00	Report	Kazakhstan	16–15 (PSO)	Brazil	Aspire Dome, Doha; Referees: Tamas Couper (NZL), Matan Painchaud (CAN)
4 February 2024; 09:00	Report	Score by quarters: 1–2, 2–2, 5–3, 2–3 PSO: 6–5			Aspire Dome, Doha; Referees: Tamas Couper (NZL), Matan Painchaud (CAN)
4 February 2024; 09:00	Report	Novikova, Pochinok 3	Goals	Cavalcante 4	Aspire Dome, Doha; Referees: Tamas Couper (NZL), Matan Painchaud (CAN)

4 February 2024; 18:45	Report	United States	10–8	Netherlands	Aspire Dome, Doha; Referees: Nóra Debreceni (HUN), Giuliana Nicolosi (ITA)
4 February 2024; 18:45	Report	Score by quarters: 3–2, 3–3, 3–1, 1–2			Aspire Dome, Doha; Referees: Nóra Debreceni (HUN), Giuliana Nicolosi (ITA)
4 February 2024; 18:45	Report	three players 2	Goals	Van de Kraats 4	Aspire Dome, Doha; Referees: Nóra Debreceni (HUN), Giuliana Nicolosi (ITA)

6 February 2024; 17:30	Report	Netherlands	27–4	Kazakhstan	Aspire Dome, Doha; Referees: David Couper (NZL), Asumi Tsuzaki (JPN)
6 February 2024; 17:30	Report	Score by quarters: 6–0, 4–1, 8–3, 9–0			Aspire Dome, Doha; Referees: David Couper (NZL), Asumi Tsuzaki (JPN)
6 February 2024; 17:30	Report	Joustra 7	Goals	Tsoy 2	Aspire Dome, Doha; Referees: David Couper (NZL), Asumi Tsuzaki (JPN)

6 February 2024; 20:30	Report	Brazil	5–21	United States	Aspire Dome, Doha; Referees: György Kun (HUN), Stanko Ivanovski (MNE)
6 February 2024; 20:30	Report	Score by quarters: 2–7, 1–6, 0–4, 2–4			Aspire Dome, Doha; Referees: György Kun (HUN), Stanko Ivanovski (MNE)
6 February 2024; 20:30	Report	Belorio 2	Goals	Steffens 5	Aspire Dome, Doha; Referees: György Kun (HUN), Stanko Ivanovski (MNE)

8 February 2024; 16:00	Report	Brazil	5–27	Netherlands	Aspire Dome, Doha; Referees: Giuliana Nicolosi (ITA), David Couper (NZL)
8 February 2024; 16:00	Report	Score by quarters: 1–7, 1–4, 2–7, 1–9			Aspire Dome, Doha; Referees: Giuliana Nicolosi (ITA), David Couper (NZL)
8 February 2024; 16:00	Report	Ferreira 2	Goals	three players 5	Aspire Dome, Doha; Referees: Giuliana Nicolosi (ITA), David Couper (NZL)

8 February 2024; 17:30	Report	United States	32–3	Kazakhstan	Aspire Dome, Doha; Referees: Ashleigh Kaeshler (AUS), Cheng Beng Guan (SGP)
8 February 2024; 17:30	Report	Score by quarters: 8–0, 8–0, 9–1, 7–2			Aspire Dome, Doha; Referees: Ashleigh Kaeshler (AUS), Cheng Beng Guan (SGP)
8 February 2024; 17:30	Report	Fattal, Steffens 5	Goals	three players 1	Aspire Dome, Doha; Referees: Ashleigh Kaeshler (AUS), Cheng Beng Guan (SGP)

=== Group B ===
Pos	Team	Pld	W	PSW	PSL	L	GF	GA	GD	Pts	Qualification
1	Spain	3	3	0	0	0	48	20	+28	9	Quarterfinals
2	Greece	3	2	0	0	1	41	31	+10	6	Playoffs
3	China	3	0	1	0	2	20	46	−26	2	Playoffs
4	France	3	0	0	1	2	19	31	−12	1	13–16th place semifinals

Source: World Aquatics
Rules for classification: 1) points; 2) head-to-head points; 3) head-to-head goal difference; 4) head-to-head number of goals scored; 5) Goal difference.

4 February 2024; 10:30	Report	China	5–18	Spain	Aspire Dome, Doha; Referees: Ashley Kaeshler (AUS), Andreia Stanojević (SRB)
4 February 2024; 10:30	Report	Score by quarters: 2–3, 2–5, 1–4, 0–6			Aspire Dome, Doha; Referees: Ashley Kaeshler (AUS), Andreia Stanojević (SRB)
4 February 2024; 10:30	Report	Lu 2	Goals	Crespí 4	Aspire Dome, Doha; Referees: Ashley Kaeshler (AUS), Andreia Stanojević (SRB)

4 February 2024; 12:00	Report	Greece	11–6	France	Aspire Dome, Doha; Referees: Frank Ohme (GER), Andrej Franulović (CRO)
4 February 2024; 12:00	Report	Score by quarters: 3–2, 2–1, 4–2, 2–1			Aspire Dome, Doha; Referees: Frank Ohme (GER), Andrej Franulović (CRO)
4 February 2024; 12:00	Report	Plevritou 3	Goals	Guillet 2	Aspire Dome, Doha; Referees: Frank Ohme (GER), Andrej Franulović (CRO)

6 February 2024; 09:00	Report	France	10–11 (PSO)	China	Aspire Dome, Doha; Referees: Nóra Debreceni (HUN), Helen Painchaud (CAN)
6 February 2024; 09:00	Report	Score by quarters: 0–2, 2–1, 3–3, 1–0 PSO: 4–5			Aspire Dome, Doha; Referees: Nóra Debreceni (HUN), Helen Painchaud (CAN)
6 February 2024; 09:00	Report	Battu, Bouloukbakchi 2	Goals	Zhang J. 5	Aspire Dome, Doha; Referees: Nóra Debreceni (HUN), Helen Painchaud (CAN)

6 February 2024; 19:00	Report	Spain	16–8	Greece	Aspire Dome, Doha; Referees: Alessandro Severo (ITA), Ashleigh Kaeshler (AUS)
6 February 2024; 19:00	Report	Score by quarters: 2–2, 5–2, 4–2, 5–2			Aspire Dome, Doha; Referees: Alessandro Severo (ITA), Ashleigh Kaeshler (AUS)
6 February 2024; 19:00	Report	Ortiz 4	Goals	three players 2	Aspire Dome, Doha; Referees: Alessandro Severo (ITA), Ashleigh Kaeshler (AUS)

8 February 2024; 19:00	Report	Spain	14–7	France	Aspire Dome, Doha; Referees: Hélène Painchaud (CAN), Darren Spiritosanto (USA)
8 February 2024; 19:00	Report	Score by quarters: 2–0, 5–4, 4–1, 3–2			Aspire Dome, Doha; Referees: Hélène Painchaud (CAN), Darren Spiritosanto (USA)
8 February 2024; 19:00	Report	Nogué 3	Goals	Bouloukbakchi, Vernoux 2	Aspire Dome, Doha; Referees: Hélène Painchaud (CAN), Darren Spiritosanto (USA)

8 February 2024; 20:30	Report	Greece	22–9	China	Aspire Dome, Doha; Referees: Nóra Debreceni (HUN), Lucas Letshabo (RSA)
8 February 2024; 20:30	Report	Score by quarters: 7–2, 4–2, 6–1, 5–4			Aspire Dome, Doha; Referees: Nóra Debreceni (HUN), Lucas Letshabo (RSA)
8 February 2024; 20:30	Report	Ninou, Plevritou 4	Goals	Deng 3	Aspire Dome, Doha; Referees: Nóra Debreceni (HUN), Lucas Letshabo (RSA)

=== Group C ===
Pos	Team	Pld	W	PSW	PSL	L	GF	GA	GD	Pts	Qualification
1	Hungary	3	3	0	0	0	71	19	+52	9	Quarterfinals
2	Australia	3	2	0	0	1	54	20	+34	6	Playoffs
3	New Zealand	3	1	0	0	2	44	36	+8	3	Playoffs
4	Singapore	3	0	0	0	3	7	101	−94	0	13–16th place semifinals

Source: World Aquatics
Rules for classification: 1) points; 2) head-to-head points; 3) head-to-head goal difference; 4) head-to-head number of goals scored; 5) Goal difference.

4 February 2024; 13:30	Report	Australia	32–1	Singapore	Aspire Dome, Doha; Referees: Matan Schwartz (ISR), Lucas Letshabo (RSA)
4 February 2024; 13:30	Report	Score by quarters: 7–1, 13–0, 6–0, 6–0			Aspire Dome, Doha; Referees: Matan Schwartz (ISR), Lucas Letshabo (RSA)
4 February 2024; 13:30	Report	Gofers 5	Goals	Wan 1	Aspire Dome, Doha; Referees: Matan Schwartz (ISR), Lucas Letshabo (RSA)

4 February 2024; 15:00	Report	Hungary	19–8	New Zealand	Aspire Dome, Doha; Referees: Asumi Tsuzaki (JPN), Natalia Markopoulou (GRE)
4 February 2024; 15:00	Report	Score by quarters: 5–2, 4–2, 2–1, 8–3			Aspire Dome, Doha; Referees: Asumi Tsuzaki (JPN), Natalia Markopoulou (GRE)
4 February 2024; 15:00	Report	Gurisatti 6	Goals	McDowall 4	Aspire Dome, Doha; Referees: Asumi Tsuzaki (JPN), Natalia Markopoulou (GRE)

6 February 2024; 10:30	Report	New Zealand	6–13	Australia	Aspire Dome, Doha; Referees: Matan Schwartz (ISR), Viktor Salnichenko (KAZ)
6 February 2024; 10:30	Report	Score by quarters: 2–3, 2–3, 1–3, 1–4			Aspire Dome, Doha; Referees: Matan Schwartz (ISR), Viktor Salnichenko (KAZ)
6 February 2024; 10:30	Report	Doyle, Houghton 2	Goals	Williams 4	Aspire Dome, Doha; Referees: Matan Schwartz (ISR), Viktor Salnichenko (KAZ)

6 February 2024; 13:30	Report	Singapore	2–39	Hungary	Aspire Dome, Doha; Referees: Lucas Letshabo (RSA), Giuliana Nicolosi (ITA)
6 February 2024; 13:30	Report	Score by quarters: 0–11, 0–7, 2–11, 0–10			Aspire Dome, Doha; Referees: Lucas Letshabo (RSA), Giuliana Nicolosi (ITA)
6 February 2024; 13:30	Report	Yap 2	Goals	Gurisatti, Rybanska 6	Aspire Dome, Doha; Referees: Lucas Letshabo (RSA), Giuliana Nicolosi (ITA)

8 February 2024; 09:00	Report	Singapore	4–30	New Zealand	Aspire Dome, Doha; Referees: Stanko Ivanovski (MNE), Yuri Maciel (BRA)
8 February 2024; 09:00	Report	Score by quarters: 1–10, 0–9, 0–5, 3–6			Aspire Dome, Doha; Referees: Stanko Ivanovski (MNE), Yuri Maciel (BRA)
8 February 2024; 09:00	Report	Yap 2	Goals	McDowall 9	Aspire Dome, Doha; Referees: Stanko Ivanovski (MNE), Yuri Maciel (BRA)

8 February 2024; 13:30	Report	Hungary	13–9	Australia	Aspire Dome, Doha; Referees: Xavi Buch (ESP), Natalia Markopoulou (GRE)
8 February 2024; 13:30	Report	Score by quarters: 4–2, 4–3, 3–1, 2–3			Aspire Dome, Doha; Referees: Xavi Buch (ESP), Natalia Markopoulou (GRE)
8 February 2024; 13:30	Report	Keszthelyi 5	Goals	Williams 3	Aspire Dome, Doha; Referees: Xavi Buch (ESP), Natalia Markopoulou (GRE)

=== Group D ===
Pos	Team	Pld	W	PSW	PSL	L	GF	GA	GD	Pts	Qualification
1	Italy	3	3	0	0	0	59	21	+38	9	Quarterfinals
2	Canada	3	2	0	0	1	52	19	+33	6	Playoffs
3	Great Britain	3	1	0	0	2	29	47	−18	3	Playoffs
4	South Africa	3	0	0	0	3	10	63	−53	0	13–16th place semifinals

Source: World Aquatics
Rules for classification: 1) points; 2) head-to-head points; 3) head-to-head goal difference; 4) head-to-head number of goals scored; 5) Goal difference.

4 February 2024; 16:30	Report	Great Britain	10–22	Italy	Aspire Dome, Doha; Referees: Jennifer McCall (USA), Cheng Beng Guan (SGP)
4 February 2024; 16:30	Report	Score by quarters: 3–5, 2–6, 2–6, 3–5			Aspire Dome, Doha; Referees: Jennifer McCall (USA), Cheng Beng Guan (SGP)
4 February 2024; 16:30	Report	Turner 3	Goals	Avegno, Bianconi 4	Aspire Dome, Doha; Referees: Jennifer McCall (USA), Cheng Beng Guan (SGP)

4 February 2024; 20:30	Report	South Africa	2–24	Canada	Aspire Dome, Doha; Referees: Viktor Salnichenko (KAZ), Yuri Maciel (BRA)
4 February 2024; 20:30	Report	Score by quarters: 0–6, 0–3, 2–8, 0–7			Aspire Dome, Doha; Referees: Viktor Salnichenko (KAZ), Yuri Maciel (BRA)
4 February 2024; 20:30	Report	Meecham, Zondo 1	Goals	three players 5	Aspire Dome, Doha; Referees: Viktor Salnichenko (KAZ), Yuri Maciel (BRA)

6 February 2024; 12:00	Report	Canada	20–5	Great Britain	Aspire Dome, Doha; Referees: Natalia Markopoulou (GRE), Jennifer McCall (USA)
6 February 2024; 12:00	Report	Score by quarters: 6–1, 5–2, 3–0, 6–2			Aspire Dome, Doha; Referees: Natalia Markopoulou (GRE), Jennifer McCall (USA)
6 February 2024; 12:00	Report	Lemay-Lavoie 4	Goals	Falvey 2	Aspire Dome, Doha; Referees: Natalia Markopoulou (GRE), Jennifer McCall (USA)

6 February 2024; 16:00	Report	Italy	25–3	South Africa	Aspire Dome, Doha; Referees: Andreia Stanojević (SRB), Yuri Maciel (BRA)
6 February 2024; 16:00	Report	Score by quarters: 6–1, 5–1, 6–1, 8–0			Aspire Dome, Doha; Referees: Andreia Stanojević (SRB), Yuri Maciel (BRA)
6 February 2024; 16:00	Report	Giustini 5	Goals	Versfeld 2	Aspire Dome, Doha; Referees: Andreia Stanojević (SRB), Yuri Maciel (BRA)

8 February 2024; 10:30	Report	South Africa	5–14	Great Britain	Aspire Dome, Doha; Referees: Viktor Salnichenko (KAZ), Asumi Tsuzaki (JPN)
8 February 2024; 10:30	Report	Score by quarters: 2–5, 0–4, 1–5, 2–0			Aspire Dome, Doha; Referees: Viktor Salnichenko (KAZ), Asumi Tsuzaki (JPN)
8 February 2024; 10:30	Report	Penney 2	Goals	Falvey 3	Aspire Dome, Doha; Referees: Viktor Salnichenko (KAZ), Asumi Tsuzaki (JPN)

8 February 2024; 12:00	Report	Italy	12–8	Canada	Aspire Dome, Doha; Referees: Jennifer McCall (USA), Zhang Liang (CHN)
8 February 2024; 12:00	Report	Score by quarters: 4–4, 4–2, 2–2, 2–0			Aspire Dome, Doha; Referees: Jennifer McCall (USA), Zhang Liang (CHN)
8 February 2024; 12:00	Report	Marletta 4	Goals	Bakoc, Wright 2	Aspire Dome, Doha; Referees: Jennifer McCall (USA), Zhang Liang (CHN)

== Knockout stage ==
=== Bracket ===
Championship bracket

Playoffs
10 February
Australia	20
Great Britain	8
10 February
New Zealand	12
Canada	14
10 February
Netherlands	16
China	14
10 February
Kazakhstan	5
Greece	24

Quarter-finals
12 February
United States	10
Australia	9
12 February
Spain	12
Canada	9
12 February
Hungary (PSO)	8 (5)
Netherlands	8 (4)
12 February
Italy	12
Greece	14

Semi-finals
14 February
United States	11
Spain	9
14 February
Hungary (PSO)	9 (4)
Greece	9 (2)

Final
16 February
United States	8
Hungary	7
Third place
16 February
Spain	10
Greece	9

5th place bracket

5th–8th place semifinals
14 February
Australia	10
Canada	8
14 February
Netherlands	10
Italy	5

Fifth place game
16 February
Australia	8
Netherlands	10
Seventh place game
16 February
Canada	12
Italy	18

9th place bracket

9th–12th place semifinals
12 February
China	15
Great Britain	10
12 February
Kazakhstan	8
New Zealand	23

Ninth place game
14 February
China	15
New Zealand	16
Eleventh place game
14 February
Great Britain	8
Kazakhstan	6

13th place bracket

13th–16th place semifinals
10 February
Brazil	8
France	17
10 February
Singapore	6
South Africa	20

13th place game
12 February
France	19
South Africa	8
15th place game
12 February
Brazil	18
Singapore	2

=== Playoffs ===
10 February 2024; 12:00	Report	Netherlands	16–14	China	Aspire Dome, Doha; Referees: Jennifer McCall (USA), Lucas Letshabo (RSA)
10 February 2024; 12:00	Report	Score by quarters: 5–5, 3–2, 5–4, 3–3			Aspire Dome, Doha; Referees: Jennifer McCall (USA), Lucas Letshabo (RSA)
10 February 2024; 12:00	Report	three players 3	Goals	Lu 5	Aspire Dome, Doha; Referees: Jennifer McCall (USA), Lucas Letshabo (RSA)

10 February 2024; 16:00	Report	Kazakhstan	5–24	Greece	Aspire Dome, Doha; Referees: Ashleigh Kaeshler (AUS), Cheng Beng Guan (SGP)
10 February 2024; 16:00	Report	Score by quarters: 2–8, 0–4, 1–7, 2–5			Aspire Dome, Doha; Referees: Ashleigh Kaeshler (AUS), Cheng Beng Guan (SGP)
10 February 2024; 16:00	Report	five players 1	Goals	Ninou 4	Aspire Dome, Doha; Referees: Ashleigh Kaeshler (AUS), Cheng Beng Guan (SGP)

10 February 2024; 17:30	Report	Australia	20–8	Great Britain	Aspire Dome, Doha; Referees: Natalia Markopoulou (GRE), Yuri Maciel (BRA)
10 February 2024; 17:30	Report	Score by quarters: 6–1, 6–2, 4–1, 4–4			Aspire Dome, Doha; Referees: Natalia Markopoulou (GRE), Yuri Maciel (BRA)
10 February 2024; 17:30	Report	A. Andrews 6	Goals	Cutler, Falvey 2	Aspire Dome, Doha; Referees: Natalia Markopoulou (GRE), Yuri Maciel (BRA)

10 February 2024; 19:00	Report	New Zealand	12–14	Canada	Aspire Dome, Doha; Referees: Nóra Debreceni (HUN), Viktor Salnichenko (KAZ)
10 February 2024; 19:00	Report	Score by quarters: 2–5, 3–5, 4–2, 3–2			Aspire Dome, Doha; Referees: Nóra Debreceni (HUN), Viktor Salnichenko (KAZ)
10 February 2024; 19:00	Report	Houghton 5	Goals	Crevier 3	Aspire Dome, Doha; Referees: Nóra Debreceni (HUN), Viktor Salnichenko (KAZ)

=== Quarterfinals ===
12 February 2024; 16:00	Report	United States	10–9	Australia	Aspire Dome, Doha; Referees: Frank Ohme (GER), David Couper (NZL)
12 February 2024; 16:00	Report	Score by quarters: 2–2, 3–1, 3–0, 2–6			Aspire Dome, Doha; Referees: Frank Ohme (GER), David Couper (NZL)
12 February 2024; 16:00	Report	Musselman 3	Goals	four players 2	Aspire Dome, Doha; Referees: Frank Ohme (GER), David Couper (NZL)

12 February 2024; 17:30	Report	Spain	12–9	Canada	Aspire Dome, Doha; Referees: Zhang Liang (CHN), Natalia Markopoulou (GRE)
12 February 2024; 17:30	Report	Score by quarters: 3–1, 4–1, 2–3, 3–4			Aspire Dome, Doha; Referees: Zhang Liang (CHN), Natalia Markopoulou (GRE)
12 February 2024; 17:30	Report	Forca 5	Goals	Crevier 3	Aspire Dome, Doha; Referees: Zhang Liang (CHN), Natalia Markopoulou (GRE)

12 February 2024; 19:00	Report	Hungary	13–12 (PSO)	Netherlands	Aspire Dome, Doha; Referees: Sébastien Dervieux (FRA), Jennifer McCall (USA)
12 February 2024; 19:00	Report	Score by quarters: 1–1, 3–1, 1–2, 3–4 PSO: 5–4			Aspire Dome, Doha; Referees: Sébastien Dervieux (FRA), Jennifer McCall (USA)
12 February 2024; 19:00	Report	Keszthelyi 3	Goals	three players 2	Aspire Dome, Doha; Referees: Sébastien Dervieux (FRA), Jennifer McCall (USA)

12 February 2024; 20:30	Report	Italy	12–14	Greece	Aspire Dome, Doha; Referees: Matan Schwartz (ISR), Ashleigh Kaeshler (AUS)
12 February 2024; 20:30	Report	Score by quarters: 0–3, 3–4, 4–4, 5–3			Aspire Dome, Doha; Referees: Matan Schwartz (ISR), Ashleigh Kaeshler (AUS)
12 February 2024; 20:30	Report	Picozzi 3	Goals	Ninou 5	Aspire Dome, Doha; Referees: Matan Schwartz (ISR), Ashleigh Kaeshler (AUS)

=== 13–16th place semifinals ===
10 February 2024; 09:00	Report	Brazil	8–17	France	Aspire Dome, Doha; Referees: Hélène Painchaud (CAN), Asumi Tsuzaki (JPN)
10 February 2024; 09:00	Report	Score by quarters: 1–4, 1–3, 2–5, 4–5			Aspire Dome, Doha; Referees: Hélène Painchaud (CAN), Asumi Tsuzaki (JPN)
10 February 2024; 09:00	Report	Belorio 4	Goals	Hertzka, Vernoux 4	Aspire Dome, Doha; Referees: Hélène Painchaud (CAN), Asumi Tsuzaki (JPN)

10 February 2024; 10:30	Report	Singapore	6–20	South Africa	Aspire Dome, Doha; Referees: Giuliana Nicolosi (ITA), David Couper (NZL)
10 February 2024; 10:30	Report	Score by quarters: 3–4, 1–5, 0–5, 2–6			Aspire Dome, Doha; Referees: Giuliana Nicolosi (ITA), David Couper (NZL)
10 February 2024; 10:30	Report	Yap 2	Goals	Versfeld 4	Aspire Dome, Doha; Referees: Giuliana Nicolosi (ITA), David Couper (NZL)

=== 9–12th place semifinals ===
12 February 2024; 12:00	Report	China	15–10	Great Britain	Aspire Dome, Doha; Referees: Asumi Tsuzaki (JPN), Nóra Debreceni (HUN)
12 February 2024; 12:00	Report	Score by quarters: 4–2, 5–3, 2–1, 4–4			Aspire Dome, Doha; Referees: Asumi Tsuzaki (JPN), Nóra Debreceni (HUN)
12 February 2024; 12:00	Report	three players 3	Goals	Turner 4	Aspire Dome, Doha; Referees: Asumi Tsuzaki (JPN), Nóra Debreceni (HUN)

12 February 2024; 13:30	Report	Kazakhstan	8–23	New Zealand	Aspire Dome, Doha; Referees: Giuliana Nicolosi (ITA), Hélène Painchaud (CAN)
12 February 2024; 13:30	Report	Score by quarters: 2–6, 1–5, 3–7, 2–5			Aspire Dome, Doha; Referees: Giuliana Nicolosi (ITA), Hélène Painchaud (CAN)
12 February 2024; 13:30	Report	Mirshina 3	Goals	McDowall 11	Aspire Dome, Doha; Referees: Giuliana Nicolosi (ITA), Hélène Painchaud (CAN)

=== 5–8th place semifinals ===
14 February 2024; 12:00	Report	Australia	10–8	Canada	Aspire Dome, Doha; Referees: Darren Spiritosanto (USA), Sébastien Dervieux (FRA)
14 February 2024; 12:00	Report	Score by quarters: 3–1, 0–2, 2–3, 5–2			Aspire Dome, Doha; Referees: Darren Spiritosanto (USA), Sébastien Dervieux (FRA)
14 February 2024; 12:00	Report	Williams 3	Goals	Wright 3	Aspire Dome, Doha; Referees: Darren Spiritosanto (USA), Sébastien Dervieux (FRA)

14 February 2024; 14:30	Report	Netherlands	10–5	Italy	Aspire Dome, Doha; Referees: Boris Margeta (SLO), György Kun (HUN)
14 February 2024; 14:30	Report	Score by quarters: 5–1, 2–3, 1–1, 2–0			Aspire Dome, Doha; Referees: Boris Margeta (SLO), György Kun (HUN)
14 February 2024; 14:30	Report	L. Rogge, van de Kraats 3	Goals	Giustini 2	Aspire Dome, Doha; Referees: Boris Margeta (SLO), György Kun (HUN)

=== Semifinals ===
14 February 2024; 16:00	Report	United States	11–9	Spain	Aspire Dome, Doha; Referees: Michiel Zwart (NED), Alessandro Severo (ITA)
14 February 2024; 16:00	Report	Score by quarters: 3–1, 3–3, 4–3, 1–2			Aspire Dome, Doha; Referees: Michiel Zwart (NED), Alessandro Severo (ITA)
14 February 2024; 16:00	Report	Flynn 3	Goals	Piralkova, E. Ruiz 3	Aspire Dome, Doha; Referees: Michiel Zwart (NED), Alessandro Severo (ITA)

14 February 2024; 17:30	Report	Hungary	13–11 (PSO)	Greece	Aspire Dome, Doha; Referees: Frank Ohme (GER), Zhang Liang (CHN)
14 February 2024; 17:30	Report	Score by quarters: 3–3, 3–3, 1–1, 2–2 PSO: 4–2			Aspire Dome, Doha; Referees: Frank Ohme (GER), Zhang Liang (CHN)
14 February 2024; 17:30	Report	Parkes 3	Goals	Ninou 4	Aspire Dome, Doha; Referees: Frank Ohme (GER), Zhang Liang (CHN)

=== 15th place game ===
12 February 2024; 09:00	Report	Brazil	18–2	Singapore	Aspire Dome, Doha; Referees: Viktor Salnichenko (KAZ), Lucas Letshabo (RSA)
12 February 2024; 09:00	Report	Score by quarters: 4–0, 2–0, 4–0, 8–2			Aspire Dome, Doha; Referees: Viktor Salnichenko (KAZ), Lucas Letshabo (RSA)
12 February 2024; 09:00	Report	three players 3	Goals	Lee, Lim 1	Aspire Dome, Doha; Referees: Viktor Salnichenko (KAZ), Lucas Letshabo (RSA)

=== 13th place game ===
12 February 2024; 10:30	Report	France	19–8	South Africa	Aspire Dome, Doha; Referees: Yuri Maciel (BRA), Cheng Beng Guan (SGP)
12 February 2024; 10:30	Report	Score by quarters: 5–0, 5–3, 6–3, 3–2			Aspire Dome, Doha; Referees: Yuri Maciel (BRA), Cheng Beng Guan (SGP)
12 February 2024; 10:30	Report	Vernoux 5	Goals	Geber, Versfeld 2	Aspire Dome, Doha; Referees: Yuri Maciel (BRA), Cheng Beng Guan (SGP)

=== Eleventh place game ===
14 February 2024; 09:00	Report	Great Britain	8–6	Kazakhstan	Aspire Dome, Doha; Referees: Cheng Beng Guan (SGP), Asumi Tsuzaki (JPN)
14 February 2024; 09:00	Report	Score by quarters: 3–1, 2–2, 0–3, 3–0			Aspire Dome, Doha; Referees: Cheng Beng Guan (SGP), Asumi Tsuzaki (JPN)
14 February 2024; 09:00	Report	Tafazolli 4	Goals	Novikova, Rakhmanova 2	Aspire Dome, Doha; Referees: Cheng Beng Guan (SGP), Asumi Tsuzaki (JPN)

=== Ninth place game ===
14 February 2024; 10:30	Report	China	15–16	New Zealand	Aspire Dome, Doha; Referees: Viktor Salnichenko (KAZ), Giuliana Nicolosi (ITA)
14 February 2024; 10:30	Report	Score by quarters: 4–4, 3–5, 3–4, 5–3			Aspire Dome, Doha; Referees: Viktor Salnichenko (KAZ), Giuliana Nicolosi (ITA)
14 February 2024; 10:30	Report	Lu 5	Goals	Houghton 5	Aspire Dome, Doha; Referees: Viktor Salnichenko (KAZ), Giuliana Nicolosi (ITA)

=== Seventh place game ===
16 February 2024; 10:00	Report	Canada	12–18	Italy	Aspire Dome, Doha; Referees: Boris Margeta (SLO), Darren Spiritosanto (USA)
16 February 2024; 10:00	Report	Score by quarters: 4–5, 4–6, 1–2, 3–5			Aspire Dome, Doha; Referees: Boris Margeta (SLO), Darren Spiritosanto (USA)
16 February 2024; 10:00	Report	Bakoc 4	Goals	Bianconi 5	Aspire Dome, Doha; Referees: Boris Margeta (SLO), Darren Spiritosanto (USA)

=== Fifth place game ===
16 February 2024; 16:00	Report	Australia	8–10	Netherlands	Aspire Dome, Doha; Referees: Jennifer McCall (USA), Nóra Debreceni (HUN)
16 February 2024; 16:00	Report	Score by quarters: 1–2, 5–1, 1–3, 1–4			Aspire Dome, Doha; Referees: Jennifer McCall (USA), Nóra Debreceni (HUN)
16 February 2024; 16:00	Report	Kearns 3	Goals	Van de Kraats 3	Aspire Dome, Doha; Referees: Jennifer McCall (USA), Nóra Debreceni (HUN)

=== Third place game ===
16 February 2024; 11:30	Report	Spain	10–9	Greece	Aspire Dome, Doha; Referees: Michiel Zwart (NED), Hélène Painchaud (CAN)
16 February 2024; 11:30	Report	Score by quarters: 2–1, 4–4, 1–1, 3–3			Aspire Dome, Doha; Referees: Michiel Zwart (NED), Hélène Painchaud (CAN)
16 February 2024; 11:30	Report	Forca 3	Goals	Ninou 3	Aspire Dome, Doha; Referees: Michiel Zwart (NED), Hélène Painchaud (CAN)

=== Final ===
16 February 2024; 17:30	Report	United States	8–7	Hungary	Aspire Dome, Doha; Referees: Xavi Buch (ESP), Natalia Markopoulou (GRE)
16 February 2024; 17:30	Report	Score by quarters: 3–2, 2–2, 0–1, 3–2			Aspire Dome, Doha; Referees: Xavi Buch (ESP), Natalia Markopoulou (GRE)
16 February 2024; 17:30	Report	Fattal 3	Goals	Garda, Keszthelyi 2	Aspire Dome, Doha; Referees: Xavi Buch (ESP), Natalia Markopoulou (GRE)

== Final ranking ==
Rank	Team
1st place, gold medalist(s)	United States
2nd place, silver medalist(s)	Hungary
3rd place, bronze medalist(s)	Spain
4	Greece
5	Netherlands
6	Australia
7	Italy
8	Canada
9	New Zealand
10	China
11	Great Britain
12	Kazakhstan
13	France
14	South Africa
15	Brazil
16	Singapore

Qualified for the 2024 Summer Olympics

2024 Women's Water Polo World Champions

United States
Eighth title

== Statistics and awards ==
=== Top goalscorers ===
Rank	Name	Goals	Shots	%
1	(New Zealand) Morgan McDowall	31	42	74
2	(Greece) Eirini Ninou	24	37	65
3	(Hungary) Rita Keszthelyi	20	37	54
4	(Netherlands) Kitty-Lynn Joustra	19	19	100
5	(New Zealand) Emmerson Houghton	18	47	38
6	(Hungary) Gréta Gurisatti	17	33	52
6	(Netherlands) Simone van de Kraats	17	25	68
6	(Australia) Alice Williams	17	32	53
9	(Italy) Roberta Bianconi	16	33	48
9	(Italy) Sofia Giustini	16	27	59
9	(China) Zhang Jing	16	31	52

=== Awards ===
The awards were announced on 16 February 2024.

All-star team
Goalkeeper	(United States) Ashleigh Johnson
Centre Forward	(Spain) Maica García
Field player	(United States) Jenna Flynn
Field player	(Hungary) Rita Keszthelyi
Field player	(New Zealand) Morgan McDowall
Field player	(Greece) Eleftheria Plevritou
Field player	(Netherlands) Simone van de Kraats
Other awards
Most Valuable Player	(Hungary) Rita Keszthelyi
Best Goalkeeper	(United States) Ashleigh Johnson
