= Time in Qatar =

Time in Qatar is given by Arabia Standard Time (AST) (UTC+03:00). Qatar does not observe daylight saving time as of April 2025.
