= Open water swimming at the 2024 World Aquatics Championships =

- Host city: Doha, Qatar
- Date(s): 3–8 February
- Venue(s): Doha Old Port
- Events: 5

Open water swimming at the 2024 World Aquatics Championships was held from 3 to 8 February 2024 at the Doha Old Port, Qatar.

== Schedule ==
Five events were held.

All times are local (UTC+3).

Date	Time	Event
3 February 2024	10:30	10 km Women
4 February 2024	10:30	10 km Men
7 February 2024	10:30	5 km Women
7 February 2024	13:00	5 km Men
8 February 2024	10:30	6 km Team Relay

== Medal summary ==
=== Medal table ===
* Host nation (Qatar)

Rank	Nation	Gold	Silver	Bronze	Total
1	Netherlands	2	0	0	2
2	France	1	2	0	3
3	Australia	1	1	0	2
4	Hungary	1	0	1	2
5	Italy	0	1	1	2
6	Spain	0	1	0	1
7	Brazil	0	0	1	1
7	Great Britain	0	0	1	1
7	Portugal	0	0	1	1
Totals (9 entries)		5	5	5	15

Source: Worldaquatics

=== Men ===
Event	Gold		Silver		Bronze	
5 km	Logan Fontaine; France	51:29.3	Marc-Antoine Olivier; France	51:29.6	Domenico Acerenza; Italy	51:30.0
10 km	Kristóf Rasovszky; Hungary	1:48:21.2	Marc-Antoine Olivier; France	1:48:23.6	Hector Pardoe; Great Britain	1:48:29.2

=== Women ===
Event	Gold		Silver		Bronze	
5 km	Sharon van Rouwendaal; Netherlands	57:33.9	Chelsea Gubecka; Australia	57:35.0	Ana Marcela Cunha; Brazil	57:36.8
10 km	Sharon van Rouwendaal; Netherlands	1:57:26.8	María de Valdés; Spain	1:57:26.9	Angélica André; Portugal	1:57:28.2

=== Team ===
Event	Gold		Silver		Bronze	
Team	Australia; Moesha Johnson; Chelsea Gubecka; Nicholas Sloman; Kyle Lee	1:03:28.0	Italy; Giulia Gabbrielleschi; Arianna Bridi; Gregorio Paltrinieri; Domenico Acerenza	1:03:28.2	Hungary; Bettina Fábián; Mira Szimcsák; Dávid Betlehem; Kristóf Rasovszky	1:04:06.8
