= Doha Port =

Doha Port ميناء الدوحة
- Location within Doha Location within Qatar
- Coordinates: 25.2950°N 51.5439°E
- Country: Qatar
- Municipality: Doha
- Zone: Zone 19
- District no.: 18

Area
  - Total: 1.5 km^{2} (0.58 sq mi)

Doha Port (Arabic: ميناء الدوحة, romanized: Mīnā’ ad Dawḩah) is a census-designated port district in Doha, the capital city of Qatar. It was established as a deepwater port by the government in 1971 and initially had four berths. As of 2025, this increased to 450 berths.

Doha Port is centrally located in Doha, and is adjacent to some of the country's most popular tourist destinations such as Doha Corniche and Souq Waqif. Milaha Port Services gained control of the port in February 2011. Until the inauguration of Hamad Port in December 2016, Doha Port was the country's sole commercial port, capable of processing most types of cargo. Immediately after Hamad Port was commissioned in December 2016 near Al Wakrah, Doha Port suspended all commercial operations.

== History ==
Thought to be the country's oldest port, it was historically used to import goods from India and Persia to Doha's souqs. However, access to Doha by large vessels was impeded by a broad coral bar separating the city's shoreline from the deeper waters of the Persian Gulf. In 1970, the Qatari government reached an agreement with Japanese company Penta-Ocean to dredge a channel to enable the direct reception of ocean-going ships. This made it the second deepwater port in Qatar after Mesaieed Port.

In 1971, the project was completed, with a wharf with 2,407 feet of frontage and four berths having been constructed. The total cost was valued at £10 million and required a massive-scale dredging of approaches. This included an outer approach channel with a bottom depth of 27 feet and a bottom width of 350 feet running for 3.5 miles. A 1.5 mile-long inner approach channel, with a bottom depth of 30 feet and a bottom width of 400 feet, broadened into a maneuvering basin. The wharf was connected to the port through a 3,600 feet-long and 40-feet wide causeway. The government started work on another 757-long wharf valued at £250,000 in 1973. In the years following its inauguration, imports grew markedly; between 1975 and 1976 alone, cargo handled at Doha increased by 770,000 tons to reach 1.2 million tons.

Doha Port remained the country's main commercial port until December 2016, when its operations were transferred to the newly-opened Hamad Port in Umm Al Houl, south of Doha.

== Gallery ==
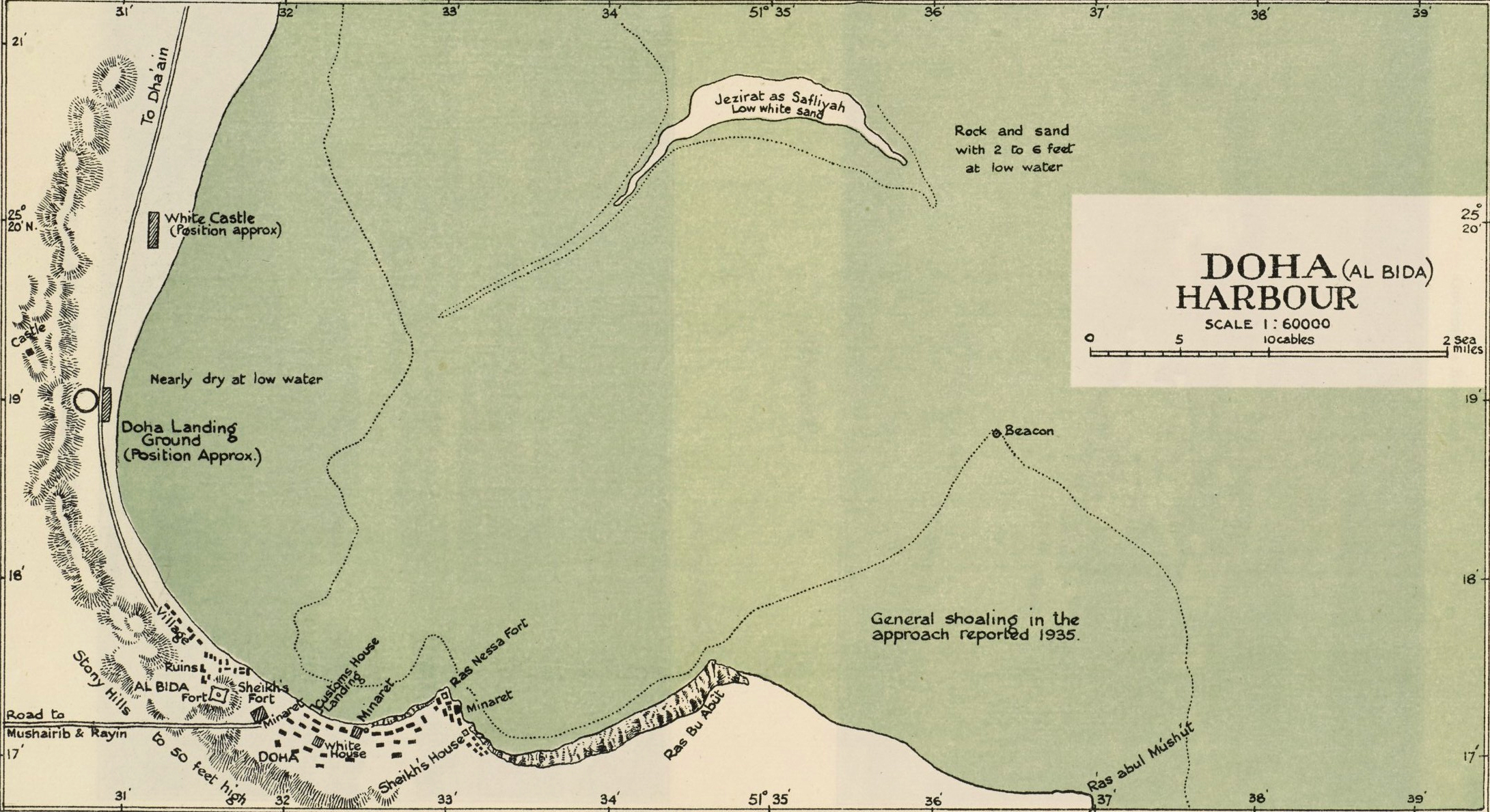
"Doha (Al Bidda) Harbour" (1937), designating Doha Port as "Customs House Landing"

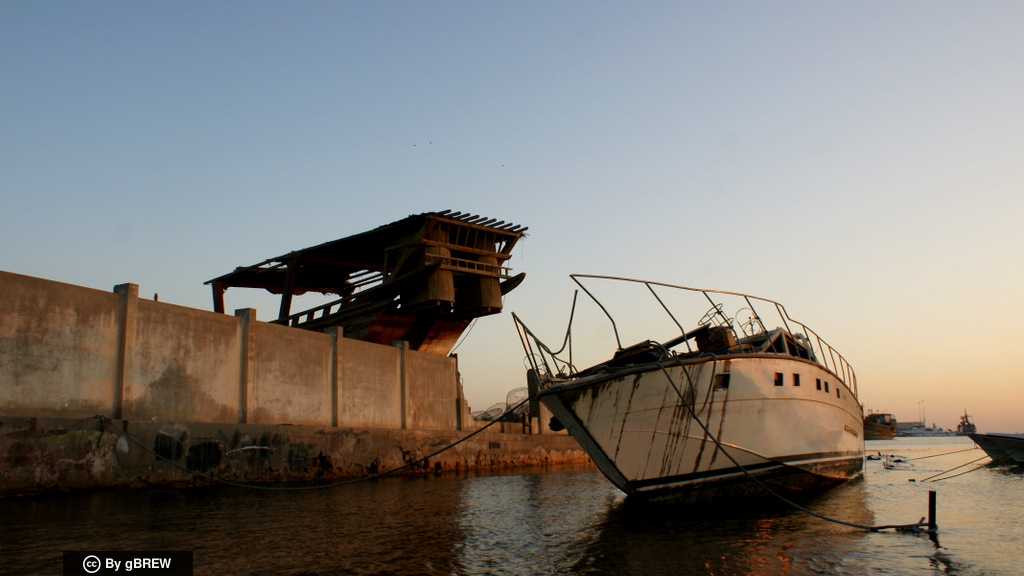
Abandoned boats at Doha Port (2012)

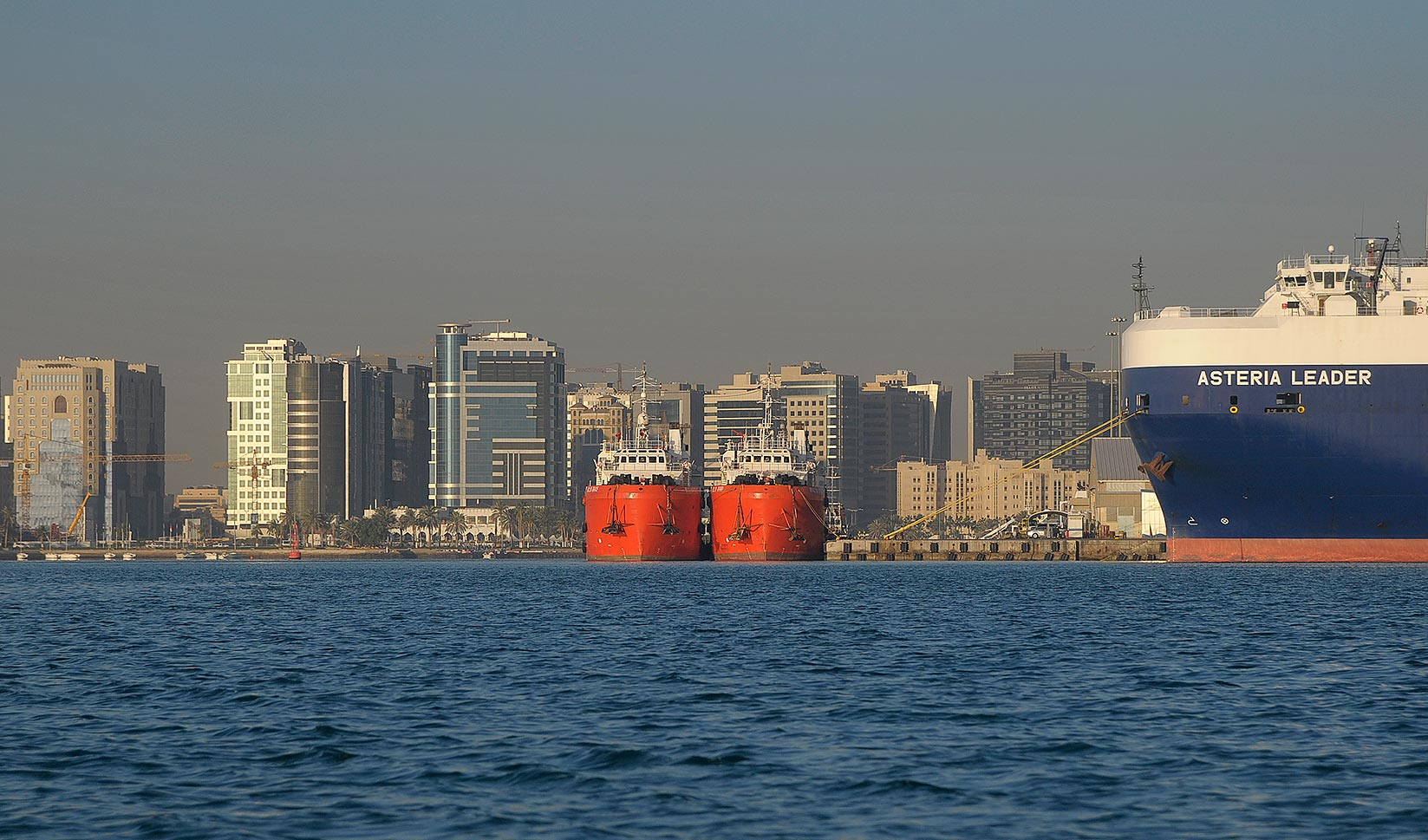
View of boats docked at Doha Port (2013)
