= United States at the 2024 World Aquatics Championships =

- Flag of the United States
- World Aquatics code: USA
- National federation: United States Aquatic Sports
- Website: usaquaticsports.org

in Doha, Qatar
- Competitors: 92 in 6 sports
- Medals Ranked 2nd: Gold 9 Silver 6 Bronze 8 Total 23

World Aquatics Championships appearances
- 1973; 1975; 1978; 1982; 1986; 1991; 1994; 1998; 2001; 2003; 2005; 2007; 2009; 2011; 2013; 2015; 2017; 2019; 2022; 2023; 2024; 2025

The United States competed at the 2024 World Aquatics Championships in Doha, Qatar from 2 to 18 February.

== Athletes by discipline ==
The following is the number of competitors who participated at the Championships per discipline.

Sport	Men	Women	Total
Artistic swimming	2	11	13
Diving	11	10	21
High diving	3	3	6
Open water swimming	4*	2	6*
Swimming	12*	8	20*
Water polo	15	15	30
Total	46*	49	95*

- Charlie Clark competed in both open water swimming and pool swimming.

== Medalists ==
Medal	Name	Sport	Event	Date
1st place, gold medalist(s)	Nic Fink	Swimming	Men's 100 metre breaststroke	12 February 2024
1st place, gold medalist(s)	Kate Douglass	Swimming	Women's 200 metre individual medley	12 February 2024
1st place, gold medalist(s)	Claire Curzan	Swimming	Women's 100 metre backstroke	13 February 2024
1st place, gold medalist(s)	Hunter Armstrong	Swimming	Men's 100 metre backstroke	13 February 2024
1st place, gold medalist(s)	Hunter Armstrong; Nic Fink; Claire Curzan; Kate Douglass; Jack Aikins*; Jake Foster*; Rachel Klinker*; Addison Sauickie*	Swimming	Mixed 4 × 100 metre medley relay	14 February 2024
1st place, gold medalist(s)	Claire Curzan	Swimming	Women's 50 metre backstroke	15 February 2024
1st place, gold medalist(s)	United States women's national water polo team: Ashleigh Johnson (gk); Maddie Musselman; Tara Prentice; Rachel Fattal; Jenna Flynn; Maggie Steffens; Jordan Raney; Ryann Neushul; Jewel Roemer; Emily Ausmus; Amanda Longan (gk); Jovana Sekulic; Denise Mammolito; Kaleigh Gilchrist*; Bayley Weber*	Water polo	Women's tournament	16 February 2024
1st place, gold medalist(s)	Claire Curzan	Swimming	Women's 200 metre backstroke	17 February 2024
1st place, gold medalist(s)	Hunter Armstrong; Nic Fink; Zach Harting; Matt King; Jack Aikins*; Jake Foster*; Shaine Casas*; Luke Hobson*	Swimming	Men's 4 × 100 metre medley relay	18 February 2024
2nd place, silver medalist(s)	Michael Andrew	Swimming	Men's 50 metre butterfly	12 February 2024
2nd place, silver medalist(s)	Claire Curzan	Swimming	Women's 100 metre butterfly	12 February 2024
2nd place, silver medalist(s)	Carson Foster	Swimming	Men's 200 metre individual medley	15 February 2024
2nd place, silver medalist(s)	Kate Douglass	Swimming	Women's 200 metre breaststroke	16 February 2024
2nd place, silver medalist(s)	Hunter Armstrong	Swimming	Men's 50 metre backstroke	18 February 2024
2nd place, silver medalist(s)	Kate Douglass	Swimming	Women's 50 metre freestyle	18 February 2024
3rd place, bronze medalist(s)	Anita Alvarez; Jaime Czarkowski; Nicole Dzurko; Keana Hunter; Audrey Kwon; Calista Liu; Bill May; Daniella Ramirez	Artistic swimming	Team acrobatic routine	4 February 2024
3rd place, bronze medalist(s)	Anita Alvarez; Daniella Ramirez; Jacklyn Luu; Calista Liu; Audrey Kwon; Megumi Field; Jaime Czarkowski; Natalia Vega Figueroa	Artistic swimming	Team free routine	9 February 2024
3rd place, bronze medalist(s)	Matt King; Shaine Casas; Luke Hobson; Carson Foster; Hunter Armstrong*; Jack Aikins*	Swimming	Men's 4 × 100 metre freestyle relay	11 February 2024
3rd place, bronze medalist(s)	Luke Hobson	Swimming	Men's 200 metre freestyle	13 February 2024
3rd place, bronze medalist(s)	Nic Fink	Swimming	Men's 50 metre breaststroke	14 February 2024
3rd place, bronze medalist(s)	Nic Fink	Swimming	Men's 200 metre breaststroke	16 February 2024
3rd place, bronze medalist(s)	Luke Hobson; Carson Foster; Hunter Armstrong; David Johnston; Shaine Casas*	Swimming	Men's 4 × 200 metre freestyle relay	16 February 2024
3rd place, bronze medalist(s)	Hunter Armstrong; Matt King; Claire Curzan; Kate Douglass; Luke Hobson*; Jack Aikins*; Addison Sauickie*; Kayla Han*	Swimming	Mixed 4 × 100 metre freestyle relay	17 February 2024

== Awards ==
- 2024 World Aquatics Championships: Best Team

== Artistic swimming ==
13 athletes were named to the World Championships roster.

Men

Athlete	Event	Preliminaries		Final	
Athlete	Event	Points	Rank	Points	Rank
Kenneth Gaudet	Solo technical routine	180.8534	10 Q	215.4533	7
Kenneth Gaudet	Solo free routine	159.7918	4 Q	166.6250	5

Mixed

Athlete	Event	Preliminaries		Final	
Athlete	Event	Points	Rank	Points	Rank
Anita Alvarez; Daniella Ramirez; Bill May; Calista Liu; Audrey Kwon; Jaime Czarkowski; Keana Hunter; Nicole Dzurko	Team acrobatic routine	220.0534	6 Q	242.2300	3rd place, bronze medalist(s)
Anita Alvarez; Ruby Remati; Daniella Ramirez; Jacklyn Luu; Calista Liu; Megumi Field; Jaime Czarkowski; Keana Hunter	Team technical routine	273.2900	4 Q	266.9333	4
Anita Alvarez; Daniella Ramirez; Jacklyn Luu; Calista Liu; Audrey Kwon; Megumi Field; Jaime Czarkowski; Natalia Vega Figueroa	Team free routine	305.8229	4 Q	304.9021	3rd place, bronze medalist(s)

== Diving ==
21 athletes were named to the World Championships roster.

Men

Athlete	Event	Preliminaries		Semi-finals		Final	
Athlete	Event	Points	Rank	Points	Rank	Points	Rank
Jack Ryan	1 m springboard	270.10	27	—		Did not advance	
Lyle Yost	1 m springboard	354.30	9 Q	—		347.25	9
Grayson Campbell	3 m springboard	328.00	37	Did not advance			
Tyler Downs	3 m springboard	342.35	29	Did not advance			
Andrew Capobianco; Quinn Henninger	3 m synchronized springboard	—				351.18	9
Joshua Hedberg	10 m platform	365.75	19	Did not advance			
Brandon Loschiavo	10 m platform	409.00	10 Q	413.65	9 Q	453.35	8
Joshua Hedberg; Carson Tyler	10 m synchronized platform	—				324.51	14

Women

Athlete	Event	Preliminaries		Semi-finals		Final	
Athlete	Event	Points	Rank	Points	Rank	Points	Rank
Alison Gibson	1 m springboard	240.45	5 Q	—		249.35	7
Hailey Hernandez	1 m springboard	232.05	11 Q	—		249.60	6
Sarah Bacon	3 m springboard	297.45	3 Q	273.45	11 Q	302.65	5
Alison Gibson; Krysta Palmer	3 m synchronized springboard	—				279.30	4
Daryn Wright	10 m platform	252.35	24	Did not advance			
Katrina Young	10 m platform	259.10	20	Did not advance			
Jessica Parratto; Delaney Schnell	10 m synchronized platform	—				271.26	8

Mixed

Athlete	Event	Final	
Athlete	Event	Points	Rank
Noah Duperre; Bridget O'Neil	3 m synchronized springboard	262.17	7
Bayleigh Cranford; Tyler Wills	10 m synchronized platform	291.90	4
Lyle Yost; Brandon Loschiavo; Katrina Young; Sarah Bacon	Team event	344.75	5

== High diving ==
6 athletes were named to the World Championships roster.

Men

Athlete	Event	Points	Rank
David Colturi	Men's high diving	302.70	13
Scott Lazeroff	Men's high diving	286.60	16
James Lichtenstein	Men's high diving	376.60	4

Women

Athlete	Event	Points	Rank
Kaylea Arnett	Women's high diving	300.05	4
Genevieve Sangpan	Women's high diving	250.45	12
Ellie Smart	Women's high diving	260.60	9

== Open water swimming ==
On 14 December 2023, six athletes were named to the World Championships roster.

Men

Athlete	Event	Time	Rank
Josh Brown	Men's 5 km	53:23.9	24
Ivan Puskovitch	Men's 5 km	53:51.0	30
Michael Brinegar	Men's 10 km	1:49:18.8	19
Ivan Puskovitch	Men's 10 km	1:48:54.4	14

Women

Athlete	Event	Time	Rank
Mariah Denigan	Women's 5 km	57:55.3	12
Katie Grimes	Women's 5 km	57:38.4	4
Mariah Denigan	Women's 10 km	1:57:31.1	6
Katie Grimes	Women's 10 km	1:57:39.4	15

Mixed

Athlete	Event	Time	Rank
Michael Brinegar; Charlie Clark; Mariah Denigan; Katie Grimes	Team relay	1:04:16.1	5

== Swimming ==
On 25 January 2024, 20 athletes were named to the World Championships roster.

Men

Athlete	Event	Heat		Semi-final		Final	
Athlete	Event	Time	Rank	Time	Rank	Time	Rank
Michael Andrew	50 m freestyle	21.78	4 Q	21.77	8 Q	21.71	4
Matt King	50 m freestyle	22.03	14 Q	21.99	14	Did not advance	
Matt King	100 m freestyle	48.11	5 Q	48.17	7 Q	48.06	=7
Luke Hobson	200 m freestyle	1:46.54	5 Q	1:45.53	4 Q	1:45.26	3rd place, bronze medalist(s)
David Johnston	400 m freestyle	3:46.99	12	—		Did not advance	
Charlie Clark	800 m freestyle	7:54.87	22	—		Did not advance	
David Johnston	800 m freestyle	7:48.20	11	—		Did not advance	
Charlie Clark	1500 m freestyle	14:57.44	10	—		Did not advance	
Michael Andrew	50 m backstroke	24.82	6 Q	24.70	7 Q	24.86	8
Hunter Armstrong	50 m backstroke	24.66	2 Q	24.43	2 Q	24.33	2nd place, silver medalist(s)
Jack Aikins	100 m backstroke	53.87	10 Q	53.72	8 Q	54.50	8
Hunter Armstrong	100 m backstroke	53.66	4 Q	53.04	1 Q	52.68	1st place, gold medalist(s)
Jack Aikins	200 m backstroke	1:58.50	11 Q	1:56.32	1 Q	1:56.21	4
Michael Andrew	50 m breaststroke	26.94	7 Q	27.18	=11	Did not advance	
Nic Fink	50 m breaststroke	26.66	=1 Q	26.77	3 Q	26.49	3rd place, bronze medalist(s)
Nic Fink	100 m breaststroke	59.19	1 Q	58.73	2 Q	58.57	1st place, gold medalist(s)
Jake Foster	100 m breaststroke	59.61	=6 Q	59.48	9	Did not advance	
Nic Fink	200 m breaststroke	2:11.00	6 Q	2:09.87	6 Q	2:08.85	3rd place, bronze medalist(s)
Jake Foster	200 m breaststroke	2:11.27	9 Q	2:08.78	1 Q	2:09.31	4
Michael Andrew	50 m butterfly	23.03	2 Q	22.94	1 Q	23.07	2nd place, silver medalist(s)
Shaine Casas	50 m butterfly	23.37	=10 Q	23.22	7 Q	23.47	8
Shaine Casas	100 m butterfly	52.21	12 Q	52.75	16	Did not advance	
Zach Harting	100 m butterfly	51.94	6 Q	51.78	8 Q	51.68	6
Zach Harting	200 m butterfly	1:56.12	3 Q	1:56.81	11	Did not advance	
Shaine Casas	200 m individual medley	2:00.46	13 Q	1:57.62	2 Q	1:57.73	5
Carson Foster	200 m individual medley	1:58.71	3 Q	1:57.13	1 Q	1:56.97	2nd place, silver medalist(s)
Carson Foster	400 m individual medley	4:13.24	4 Q	—		4:12.62	4
David Johnston	400 m individual medley	4:12.51	1 Q	—		4:13.05	=5
Matt King; Shaine Casas; Luke Hobson; Carson Foster; Hunter Armstrong*; Jack Aikins*	4 × 100 m freestyle relay	3:12.32	1 Q	—		3:12.29	3rd place, bronze medalist(s)
Luke Hobson; Carson Foster; Hunter Armstrong; David Johnston; Shaine Casas*	4 × 200 m freestyle relay	7:10.70	8 Q	—		7:02.08	3rd place, bronze medalist(s)
Hunter Armstrong; Nic Fink; Zach Harting; Matt King; Jack Aikins*; Jake Foster*; Shaine Casas*; Luke Hobson*	4 × 100 m medley relay	3:32.53	1 Q	—		3:29.80	1st place, gold medalist(s)

Women

Athlete	Event	Heat		Semi-final		Final	
Athlete	Event	Time	Rank	Time	Rank	Time	Rank
Kate Douglass	50 m freestyle	24.19	2 Q	24.24	3 Q	23.91 AM	2nd place, silver medalist(s)
Kate Douglass	100 m freestyle	54.12	5 Q	53.31	5 Q	53.02	4
Addison Sauickie	200 m freestyle	1:58.33	10 Q	1:58.51	12	Did not advance	
Addison Sauickie	400 m freestyle	4:09.67	11	—		Did not advance	
Kayla Han	800 m freestyle	8:40.36	15	—		Did not advance	
Kayla Han	1500 m freestyle	16:35.02	17	—		Did not advance	
Kate Hurst	1500 m freestyle	16:17.83	9	—		Did not advance	
Claire Curzan	50 m backstroke	27.99	3 Q	27.65	3 Q	27.43	1st place, gold medalist(s)
Claire Curzan	100 m backstroke	59.72	1 Q	58.73	1 Q	58.29	1st place, gold medalist(s)
Claire Curzan	200 m backstroke	2:10.50	1 Q	2:07.01	1 Q	2:05.77	1st place, gold medalist(s)
Lilla Bognar	200 m backstroke	2:12.56	13 Q	2:11.26	10	Did not advance	
Piper Enge	50 m breaststroke	31.09	15 Q	30.53	4 Q	30.69	6
Piper Enge	100 m breaststroke	1:08.14	18	Did not advance			
Kate Douglass	200 m breaststroke	2:24.15	1 Q	2:23.17	2 Q	2:20.91	2nd place, silver medalist(s)
Claire Curzan	50 m butterfly	DNS	—	Did not advance			
Claire Curzan	100 m butterfly	57.94	5 Q	57.06	2 Q	56.61	2nd place, silver medalist(s)
Rachel Klinker	200 m butterfly	2:09.85	4 Q	2:07.70	2 Q	2:08.19	4
Kate Douglass	200 m individual medley	2:10.01	1 Q	2:08.41	1 Q	2:07.05	1st place, gold medalist(s)
Lilla Bognar	400 m individual medley	4:44.22	9	—		Did not advance	
Kayla Han	400 m individual medley	4:47.12	13	—		Did not advance	
Addison Sauickie; Kayla Han; Kate Hurst; Rachel Klinker	4 × 200 m freestyle relay	8:01.97	11	—		Did not advance	
	4 × 100 m medley relay	DNS	—			Did not advance	

Mixed

Athlete	Event	Heat		Final	
Athlete	Event	Time	Rank	Time	Rank
Hunter Armstrong; Matt King; Claire Curzan; Kate Douglass; Luke Hobson*; Jack Aikins*; Addison Sauickie*; Kayla Han*	4 × 100 m freestyle relay	3:28.76	5 Q	3:22.28	3rd place, bronze medalist(s)
Hunter Armstrong; Nic Fink; Claire Curzan; Kate Douglass; Jack Aikins*; Jake Foster*; Rachel Klinker*; Addison Sauickie*	4 × 100 m medley relay	3:45.93	3 Q	3:40.22	1st place, gold medalist(s)

== Water polo ==
Summary

Team	Event	Group stage				Playoff	Quarterfinal	Semi-final	Final / BM	
Team	Event	Opposition Score	Opposition Score	Opposition Score	Rank	Opposition Score	Opposition Score	Opposition Score	Opposition Score	Rank
United States	Men's tournament	Montenegro; L 15–16	Japan; W 18–5	Serbia; L 12–14	3 QP	Italy; L 12–13	Did not advance	9th-12th place Australia; W 16–10	Ninth place game Romania; W 13–9	9
United States	Women's tournament	Netherlands; W 10–8	Brazil; W 21–5	Kazakhstan; W 32–3	1 Q	Bye	Australia; W 10–9	Spain; W 11–9	Hungary; W 8–7	1st place, gold medalist(s)

=== Men's tournament ===
Team roster

The following is the American roster.

Head coach: Dejan Udovičić

- 1 Adrian Weinberg GK
- 2 Johnny Hooper FP
- 3 Marko Vavic FP
- 4 Alexander Obert FP
- 5 Hannes Daube FP
- 6 Luca Cupido FP
- 7 Ben Hallock FP
- 8 Dylan Woodhead FP
- 9 Alex Bowen FP
- 10 Chase Dodd FP
- 11 Ryder Dodd FP
- 12 Max Irving FP
- 13 Drew Holland GK
- 14 Tyler Abramson FP
- 15 Quinn Woodhead FP

Group play

Pos	Team	Pld	W	PSW	PSL	L	GF	GA	GD	Pts	Qualification
1	Serbia	3	3	0	0	0	45	28	+17	9	Quarterfinals
2	Montenegro	3	1	1	0	1	30	36	−6	5	Playoffs
3	United States	3	1	0	1	1	41	30	+11	4	Playoffs
4	Japan	3	0	0	0	3	26	48	−22	0	13–16th place semifinals

Source: World Aquatics
Rules for classification: 1) points; 2) head-to-head points; 3) head-to-head goal difference; 4) head-to-head number of goals scored; 5) Goal difference.

5 February 2024; 17:30	Report	Montenegro	16–15 (PSO)	United States	Aspire Dome, Doha; Referees: Boris Margeta (SLO), Frank Ohme (GER)
5 February 2024; 17:30	Report	Score by quarters: 3–1, 2–3, 4–3, 2–4 PSO: 5–4			Aspire Dome, Doha; Referees: Boris Margeta (SLO), Frank Ohme (GER)
5 February 2024; 17:30	Report	three players 2	Goals	Bowen 5	Aspire Dome, Doha; Referees: Boris Margeta (SLO), Frank Ohme (GER)

7 February 2024; 12:00	Report	United States	18–5	Japan	Aspire Dome, Doha; Referees: Xavi Buch (ESP), Sébastien Dervieux (FRA)
7 February 2024; 12:00	Report	Score by quarters: 4–1, 4–0, 4–2, 6–2			Aspire Dome, Doha; Referees: Xavi Buch (ESP), Sébastien Dervieux (FRA)
7 February 2024; 12:00	Report	Hooper 6	Goals	Ogihara 2	Aspire Dome, Doha; Referees: Xavi Buch (ESP), Sébastien Dervieux (FRA)

9 February 2024; 17:30	Report	Serbia	14–12	United States	Aspire Dome, Doha; Referees: Boris Margeta (SLO), Georgios Stavridis (GRE)
9 February 2024; 17:30	Report	Score by quarters: 2–3, 3–4, 6–1, 3–4			Aspire Dome, Doha; Referees: Boris Margeta (SLO), Georgios Stavridis (GRE)
9 February 2024; 17:30	Report	three players 3	Goals	Daube 4	Aspire Dome, Doha; Referees: Boris Margeta (SLO), Georgios Stavridis (GRE)

Playoffs

11 February 2024; 19:00	Report	United States	12–13	Italy	Aspire Dome, Doha; Referees: Xavi Buch (ESP), Michiel Zwart (NED)
11 February 2024; 19:00	Report	Score by quarters: 3–3, 1–3, 4–4, 4–3			Aspire Dome, Doha; Referees: Xavi Buch (ESP), Michiel Zwart (NED)
11 February 2024; 19:00	Report	Daube 4	Goals	Di Fulvio, Fondelli 3	Aspire Dome, Doha; Referees: Xavi Buch (ESP), Michiel Zwart (NED)

9–12th place semifinals

13 February 2024; 13:30	Report	Australia	10–16	United States	Aspire Dome, Doha; Referees: Alessandro Severo (ITA), Stanko Ivanovski (MNE)
13 February 2024; 13:30	Report	Score by quarters: 3–4, 4–5, 1–3, 2–4			Aspire Dome, Doha; Referees: Alessandro Severo (ITA), Stanko Ivanovski (MNE)
13 February 2024; 13:30	Report	Pavillard 6	Goals	Bowen, Woodhead 3	Aspire Dome, Doha; Referees: Alessandro Severo (ITA), Stanko Ivanovski (MNE)

Eleventh place game

15 February 2024; 10:30	Report	Romania	9–13	United States	Aspire Dome, Doha; Referees: Stanko Ivanovski (MNE), David Couper (NZL)
15 February 2024; 10:30	Report	Score by quarters: 2–5, 2–2, 4–3, 1–3			Aspire Dome, Doha; Referees: Stanko Ivanovski (MNE), David Couper (NZL)
15 February 2024; 10:30	Report	Georgescu 4	Goals	Bowen, Irving 3	Aspire Dome, Doha; Referees: Stanko Ivanovski (MNE), David Couper (NZL)

=== Women's tournament ===
Team roster

The following is the American roster.

Head coach: Adam Krikorian

- 1 Ashleigh Johnson GK
- 2 Maddie Musselman FP
- 3 Tara Prentice FF
- 4 Rachel Fattal FP
- 5 Jenna Flynn FP
- 6 Maggie Steffens FP
- 7 Jordan Raney FP
- 8 Ryann Neushul FP
- 9 Jewel Roemer FP
- 10 Kaleigh Gilchrist FP
- 11 Bayley Weber FP
- 12 Emily Ausmus FP
- 13 Amanda Longan GK
- 14 Jovana Sekulic FP
- 15 Denise Mammolito FP

Group play

Pos	Team	Pld	W	PSW	PSL	L	GF	GA	GD	Pts	Qualification
1	United States	3	3	0	0	0	63	16	+47	9	Quarterfinals
2	Netherlands	3	2	0	0	1	62	19	+43	6	Playoffs
3	Kazakhstan	3	0	1	0	2	17	69	−52	2	Playoffs
4	Brazil	3	0	0	1	2	20	58	−38	1	13–16th place semifinals

Source: World Aquatics
Rules for classification: 1) points; 2) head-to-head points; 3) head-to-head goal difference; 4) head-to-head number of goals scored; 5) Goal difference.

4 February 2024; 18:45	Report	United States	10–8	Netherlands	Aspire Dome, Doha; Referees: Nóra Debreceni (HUN), Giuliana Nicolosi (ITA)
4 February 2024; 18:45	Report	Score by quarters: 3–2, 3–3, 3–1, 1–2			Aspire Dome, Doha; Referees: Nóra Debreceni (HUN), Giuliana Nicolosi (ITA)
4 February 2024; 18:45	Report	three players 2	Goals	Van de Kraats 4	Aspire Dome, Doha; Referees: Nóra Debreceni (HUN), Giuliana Nicolosi (ITA)

6 February 2024; 20:30	Report	Brazil	5–21	United States	Aspire Dome, Doha; Referees: György Kun (HUN), Stanko Ivanovski (MNE)
6 February 2024; 20:30	Report	Score by quarters: 2–7, 1–6, 0–4, 2–4			Aspire Dome, Doha; Referees: György Kun (HUN), Stanko Ivanovski (MNE)
6 February 2024; 20:30	Report	Belorio 2	Goals	Steffens 5	Aspire Dome, Doha; Referees: György Kun (HUN), Stanko Ivanovski (MNE)

8 February 2024; 17:30	Report	United States	32–3	Kazakhstan	Aspire Dome, Doha; Referees: Ashleigh Kaeshler (AUS), Cheng Beng Guan (SGP)
8 February 2024; 17:30	Report	Score by quarters: 8–0, 8–0, 9–1, 7–2			Aspire Dome, Doha; Referees: Ashleigh Kaeshler (AUS), Cheng Beng Guan (SGP)
8 February 2024; 17:30	Report	Fattal, Steffens 5	Goals	three players 1	Aspire Dome, Doha; Referees: Ashleigh Kaeshler (AUS), Cheng Beng Guan (SGP)

Quarterfinals

12 February 2024; 16:00	Report	United States	10–9	Australia	Aspire Dome, Doha; Referees: Frank Ohme (GER), David Couper (NZL)
12 February 2024; 16:00	Report	Score by quarters: 2–2, 3–1, 3–0, 2–6			Aspire Dome, Doha; Referees: Frank Ohme (GER), David Couper (NZL)
12 February 2024; 16:00	Report	Musselman 3	Goals	four players 2	Aspire Dome, Doha; Referees: Frank Ohme (GER), David Couper (NZL)

Semifinals

14 February 2024; 16:00	Report	United States	11–9	Spain	Aspire Dome, Doha; Referees: Michiel Zwart (NED), Alessandro Severo (ITA)
14 February 2024; 16:00	Report	Score by quarters: 3–1, 3–3, 4–3, 1–2			Aspire Dome, Doha; Referees: Michiel Zwart (NED), Alessandro Severo (ITA)
14 February 2024; 16:00	Report	Flynn 3	Goals	Piralkova, E. Ruiz 3	Aspire Dome, Doha; Referees: Michiel Zwart (NED), Alessandro Severo (ITA)

Final

16 February 2024; 17:30	Report	United States	8–7	Hungary	Aspire Dome, Doha; Referees: Xavi Buch (ESP), Natalia Markopoulou (GRE)
16 February 2024; 17:30	Report	Score by quarters: 3–2, 2–2, 0–1, 3–2			Aspire Dome, Doha; Referees: Xavi Buch (ESP), Natalia Markopoulou (GRE)
16 February 2024; 17:30	Report	Fattal 3	Goals	Garda, Keszthelyi 2	Aspire Dome, Doha; Referees: Xavi Buch (ESP), Natalia Markopoulou (GRE)
