= Canada at the 2023 World Aquatics Championships =

- Flag of Canada
- World Aquatics code: CAN
- National federation: Aquatic Federation of Canada
- Website: aquaticscanadaaquatiques.com

in Fukuoka, Japan 14 July 2023 – 30 July 2023
- Competitors: 84 (31 men and 53 women) in 6 sports
- Medals: Gold 2 Silver 3 Bronze 5 Total 10

World Aquatics Championships appearances
- 1973; 1975; 1978; 1982; 1986; 1991; 1994; 1998; 2001; 2003; 2005; 2007; 2009; 2011; 2013; 2015; 2017; 2019; 2022; 2023; 2024; 2025

Canada is scheduled to compete at the 2023 World Aquatics Championships in Fukuoka, Japan from 14 to 30 July 2023.

== Medallists ==
Medal	Name	Sport	Event	Date
1st place, gold medalist(s)	Summer McIntosh	Swimming	Women's 200 m butterfly	27 July 2023
1st place, gold medalist(s)	Summer McIntosh	Swimming	Women's 400 m medley	30 July 2023
2nd place, silver medalist(s)	Maggie MacNeil	Swimming	Women's 100 m butterfly	24 July 2023
2nd place, silver medalist(s)	Molly Carlson	High diving	Women's high diving	26 July 2023
2nd place, silver medalist(s)	Josh Liendo	Swimming	Men's 100 m butterfly	29 July 2023
3rd place, bronze medalist(s)	Caeli McKay	Diving	Women's 10 m platform	19 July 2023
3rd place, bronze medalist(s)	Pamela Ware	Diving	Women's 3 m springboard	21 July 2023
3rd place, bronze medalist(s)	Jessica Macaulay	High diving	Women's high diving	26 July 2023
3rd place, bronze medalist(s)	Summer McIntosh	Swimming	Women's 200 m freestyle	26 July 2023
3rd place, bronze medalist(s)	Kylie Masse; Sophie Angus; Maggie Mac Neil; Summer McIntosh; Ingrid Wilm; Mary-Sophie Harvey	Swimming	Women's 4 × 100 metre medley	30 July 2023

== Athletes by discipline ==
The following is the list of number of competitors participating at the Championships per discipline.

Sport	Men	Women	Total
Artistic swimming	0	11	11
Diving	2	5	7
High diving	1	3	4
Open water swimming	3*	2*	5*
Swimming	13*	14*	27
Water polo	14	14	28
Total	32	48	80

- Eric Brown and Emma Finlin will compete in both open water swimming and indoor swimming.

== Artistic swimming ==
Women

Athlete	Event	Preliminaries		Final	
Athlete	Event	Points	Rank	Points	Rank
Audrey Lamothe	Solo technical routine	214.9417	6 Q	216.4351	6
Audrey Lamothe	Solo free routine	167.3625	8 Q	207.4480	4
Scarlett Finn; Kenzie Priddell	Duet technical routine	192.0200	18	Did not advance	

Mixed

Athlete	Event	Preliminaries		Final	
Athlete	Event	Points	Rank	Points	Rank
Olena Verbinska; Florence Tremblay; Laurianne Imbeau; Raphaelle Plante; Jonnie Newman; Claire Scheffel; Kiara Quieti; Kenzie Priddell	Team acrobatic routine	203.6600	6 Q	205.4900	6
Jonnie Newman; Scarlett Finn; Raphaelle Plante; Florence Tremblay; Kenzie Priddell; Sydney Carroll; Laurianne Imbeau; Olena Verbinska	Team technical routine	190.7666	14	Did not advance	

== Diving ==
Canada's diving team consisted of eight athletes (three men and five women). Rylan Wiens was originally set to compete, however he later withdrew after suffering a back injury

Men

Athlete	Event	Preliminaries		Semifinals		Final	
Athlete	Event	Points	Rank	Points	Rank	Points	Rank
Bryden Hattie	1 m springboard	311.30	28	—N/a		Did not advance	
Bryden Hattie	3 m springboard	326.30	43	Did not advance			
Nathan Zsombor-Murray	10 m platform	391.55	13 Q	422.55	9 Q	468.00	7

Women

Athlete	Event	Preliminaries		Semifinals		Final	
Athlete	Event	Points	Rank	Points	Rank	Points	Rank
Mia Vallée	1 m springboard	232.15	15	—N/a		Did not advance	
Pamela Ware	1 m springboard	237.35	12 Q	—N/a		284.40	4
Mia Vallée	3 m springboard	274.80	21	Did not advance			
Pamela Ware	3 m springboard	304.95	3 Q	332.40	4 Q	332.00	3rd place, bronze medalist(s)
Elaena Dick	10 m platform	283.90	18 Q	271.50	17	Did not advance	
Caeli McKay	10 m platform	322.15	5 Q	324.05	5 Q	340.25	3rd place, bronze medalist(s)
Mia Vallée; Pamela Ware	3 m synchronized springboard	275.73	7 Q	—N/a		284.22	5
Caeli McKay; Kate Miller	10 m synchronized platform	292.50	4 Q	—N/a		279.93	8

Mixed

Athlete	Event	Final	
Athlete	Event	Points	Rank
Bryden Hattie; Pamela Ware	3 m synchronized springboard	DNS	
Nathan Zsombor-Murray; Kate Miller	10 m synchronized platform	290.43	5

== High diving ==
Canada's high diving team consisted of four athletes (one man and three women).

Athlete	Event	Points	Rank
Michael Foisy	Men's high diving	236.50	19
Molly Carlson	Women's high diving	322.80	2nd place, silver medalist(s)
Simone Leathead	Women's high diving	312.40	4
Jessica Macaulay	Women's high diving	320.95	3rd place, bronze medalist(s)

== Open water swimming ==
Canada's open water swimming team consisted of six athletes (three men and three women). Eric Brown and Emma Finlin also qualified for events in the indoor pool competition.

Men

Athlete	Event	Time	Rank
Benjamin Cote	Men's 5 km	57:24.1	29
Eric Hedlin	Men's 5 km	56:54.0	26
Eric Brown	Men's 10 km	1:55:31.2	32
Eric Hedlin	Men's 10 km	1:54:25.4	31

Women

Athlete	Event	Time	Rank
Bailey O'Regan	Women's 5 km	1:02:27.0	33
Emma Finlin	Women's 10 km	2:07:09.5	30
Bailey O'Regan	Women's 10 km	2:10:08.1	38

Mixed

Athlete	Event	Time	Rank
Emma Finlin; Eric Hedlin; Bailey O'Regan; Eric Brown	Team relay	1:14:11.8	10

== Swimming ==
Canada's swimming team consisted of 28 swimmers (14 men and 14 women). Penny Oleksiak was originally named in the team, however withdrew due to injury. Sydney Pickrem and Mabel Zavaros withdrew from the event due to personal circumstances and injury respectively.

Men

Athlete	Event	Heat		Semifinal		Final	
Athlete	Event	Time	Rank	Time	Rank	Time	Rank
Javier Acevedo	100 metre freestyle	48.67	24	Did not advance			
Javier Acevedo	50 metre backstroke	25.18	19	Did not advance			
Javier Acevedo	100 metre backstroke	54.58	26	Did not advance			
Eric Brown	400 m freestyle	3:50.68	23	—N/a		Did not advance	
Eric Brown	800 metre freestyle	8:01.41	28	—N/a		Did not advance	
James Dergousoff	50 metre breaststroke	27.53	21	Did not advance			
James Dergousoff	100 metre breaststroke	1:01.19	28	Did not advance			
Collyn Gagne	400 metre individual medley	4:16.08	13	—N/a		Did not advance	
Patrick Hussey	200 metre freestyle	DNS					
Ilya Kharun	50 metre butterfly	23.27	9 Q	23.27	14	Did not advance	
Ilya Kharun	100 metre butterfly	51.33	7 Q	51.22	9	Did not advance	
Ilya Kharun	200 metre butterfly	1:55.93	13 Q	1:54.28 NR	3 Q	1:53.82 NR	4
Finlay Knox	200 metre individual medley	1:58.64	12 Q	1:58.23	13	Did not advance	
Joshua Liendo	50 metre freestyle	21.97	13 Q	21.88	8 Q	Withdraw	
Joshua Liendo	100 metre freestyle	48.03	7 Q	48.22	14	Did not advance	
Joshua Liendo	50 metre butterfly	23.36	15 Q	23.33	15	Did not advance	
Joshua Liendo	100 metre butterfly	50.98	3 Q	50.75	3 Q	50.34 NR	2nd place, silver medalist(s)
Hugh McNeill	200 metre backstroke	1:57.73	7 Q	1:58.86	15	Did not advance	
Brayden Taivassalo	200 metre breaststroke	2:13.81	30	Did not advance			
Lorne Wigginton	400 metre individual medley	4:13.75	9	—N/a		Did not advance	
Joshua Liendo; Ruslan Gaziev; Finlay Knox; Javier Acevedo; Édouard Fullum-Huot	4 × 100 m freestyle relay	3:13.49	4 Q	—N/a		3:12.05	5
Ruslan Gaziev; Patrick Hussey; Finlay Knox; Javier Acevedo	4 × 200 m freestyle relay	7:10.67	12	—N/a		Did not advance	
Javier Acevedo; James Dergousoff; Joshua Liendo; Ruslan Gaziev	4 × 100 m medley relay	3:32.11	6 Q	—N/a		3:32.61	7

Women

Athlete	Event	Heat		Semifinal		Final	
Athlete	Event	Time	Rank	Time	Rank	Time	Rank
Emma Finlin	800 metre freestyle	8:36.47	18	—N/a		Did not advance	
Emma Finlin	1500 metre freestyle	16:15.77	12	—N/a		Did not advance	
Sophie Angus	50 metre breaststroke	31.01	22	Did not advance			
Sophie Angus	100 metre breaststroke	1:07.34	22	Did not advance			
Mary-Sophie Harvey	200 metre freestyle	1:58.50	19	Did not advance			
Mary-Sophie Harvey	200 metre individual medley	2:09.65	3 Q	2:11.47	11	Did not advance	
Hanna Henderson	50 metre freestyle	25.71	36	Did not advance			
Ella Jansen	400 metre freestyle	4:12.77	22	—N/a		Did not advance	
Ella Jansen	400 metre individual medley	4:43.35	17	—N/a		Did not advance	
Maggie Mac Neil	50 metre butterfly	26.33	19	Did not advance			
Maggie Mac Neil	100 metre butterfly	57.56	5 Q	56.78	3 Q	56.45	2nd place, silver medalist(s)
Kylie Masse	50 metre backstroke	27.48	2 Q	27.49	4 Q	27.28	4
Kylie Masse	100 metre backstroke	59.14	4 Q	59.06	4 Q	59.09	4
Kylie Masse	200 metre backstroke	2:09.31	6 Q	2:08.51	5 Q	2:07.52	5
Summer McIntosh	200 metre freestyle	1:55.88	2 Q	1:54.67	2 Q	1:53.65 WJ, NR	3rd place, bronze medalist(s)
Summer McIntosh	400 metre freestyle	4:01.72	3 Q	—N/a		3:59.94	4
Summer McIntosh	200 metre butterfly	2:07.91	3 Q	2:06.85	3 Q	2:04.06 AM, WJ	1st place, gold medalist(s)
Summer McIntosh	400 metre individual medley	4:36.57	2 Q	—N/a		4:27.11 CR	1st place, gold medalist(s)
Katerine Savard	50 metre butterfly	26.23	15 Q	25.98	12	Did not advance	
Katerine Savard	100 metre butterfly	58.56	16 Q	58.18	13	Did not advance	
Ingrid Wilm	50 metre backstroke	27.75	6 Q	27.71	7 Q	27.41	6
Ingrid Wilm	100 metre backstroke	59.96	9 Q	59.35	6 Q	59.31	5
Ingrid Wilm	200 metre backstroke	2:12.67	19	Did not advance			
Kelsey Wog	200 metre breaststroke	2:25.60	10 Q	2:24.16	8 Q	2:25.21	8
Summer McIntosh; Maggie Mac Neil; Mary-Sophie Harvey; Taylor Ruck; Katerine Savard	4 × 100 m freestyle relay	3:36.39	7 Q	—N/a		3:36.62	7
Mary-Sophie Harvey; Summer McIntosh; Emma O'Croinin; Brooklyn Douthwright; Ella Jansen; Katerine Savard	4 × 200 m freestyle relay	7:54.73	6 Q	—N/a		7:49.98	5
Kylie Masse; Sophie Angus; Maggie Mac Neil; Summer McIntosh; Ingrid Wilm; Mary-Sophie Harvey	4 × 100 m medley relay	3:55.93	1 Q	—N/a		3:54.12	3rd place, bronze medalist(s)

Mixed

Athlete	Event	Heat		Final	
Athlete	Event	Time	Rank	Time	Rank
Joshua Liendo; Ruslan Gaziev; Maggie Mac Neil; Mary-Sophie Harvey; Javier Acevedo; Taylor Ruck	4 × 100 m freestyle relay	3:24.63	5 Q	3:23.82	4
Kylie Masse; James Dergousoff; Margaret MacNeil; Ruslan Gaziev; Ingrid Wilm	4 × 100 m medley relay	3:44.32	6 Q	3:43.72	6

== Water polo ==
Summary

Team	Event	Group stage				Playoff	Quarterfinal	Semifinal	Final / BM	
Team	Event	Opposition Score	Opposition Score	Opposition Score	Rank	Opposition Score	Opposition Score	Opposition Score	Opposition Score	Rank
Canada	Men's tournament	China; W 13–10	Italy; L 6–24	France; L 11–15	3 QP	United States; L 10–13	—N/a	Croatia; L 5–13	Japan; L 11–23	12
Canada	Women's tournament	Hungary; L 10–11	New Zealand; W 13–11	Japan; W 17–12	2 QP	South Africa; W 21–6	Netherlands; L 10–17	United States; L 4–16	Greece; W 14–12	7

=== Men's tournament ===
Team roster

The following is the Canadian roster.

Head coach: Patrick Oaten

- 1 Milan Radenovic GK
- 2 Gaelan Patterson FP
- 3 Bogdan Djerkovic FP
- 4 Nicolas Constantin-Bicari FP
- 5 Matt Halajian FP
- 6 Jérémie Blanchard FP
- 7 Nikos Gerakoudis FP
- 8 Jeremie Cote FP
- 9 Aleksa Gardijan FP
- 10 Aria Soleimanipak FP
- 11 David Lapins FP
- 12 Léo Hachem FP
- 13 Brody McKnight GK
- Reuel D'Souza FP

Group play

Pos	Team	Pld	W	PSW	PSL	L	GF	GA	GD	Pts	Qualification
1	Italy	3	3	0	0	0	55	17	+38	9	Quarterfinals
2	France	3	2	0	0	1	38	32	+6	6	Playoffs
3	Canada	3	1	0	0	2	30	49	−19	3	Playoffs
4	China	3	0	0	0	3	23	48	−25	0	

Source: Sportresult
Rules for classification: 1) points; 2) head-to-head points; 3) head-to-head goal difference; 4) head-to-head number of goals scored; 5) Goal difference.

17 July 2023; 12:00	Report	Canada	13–10	China	Marine Messe Fukuoka, Fukuoka; Referees: Tamás Kovács-Csatlós (HUN), Nenad Peris (CRO)
17 July 2023; 12:00	Report	Score by quarters: 4–0, 3–6, 4–4, 2–0			Marine Messe Fukuoka, Fukuoka; Referees: Tamás Kovács-Csatlós (HUN), Nenad Peris (CRO)
17 July 2023; 12:00	Report	Constantin-Bicari, Gardijan 3	Goals	Peng 4	Marine Messe Fukuoka, Fukuoka; Referees: Tamás Kovács-Csatlós (HUN), Nenad Peris (CRO)

19 July 2023; 09:00	Report	Italy	24–6	Canada	Marine Messe Fukuoka, Fukuoka; Referees: Tamás Kovács-Csatlós (HUN), David Gómez (ESP)
19 July 2023; 09:00	Report	Score by quarters: 6–0, 4–2, 8–4, 6–0			Marine Messe Fukuoka, Fukuoka; Referees: Tamás Kovács-Csatlós (HUN), David Gómez (ESP)
19 July 2023; 09:00	Report	three players 4	Goals	Constantin-Bicari 3	Marine Messe Fukuoka, Fukuoka; Referees: Tamás Kovács-Csatlós (HUN), David Gómez (ESP)

21 July 2023; 20:30	Report	France	15–11	Canada	Marine Messe Fukuoka, Fukuoka; Referees: Nenad Peris (CRO), Vojin Putniković (SRB)
21 July 2023; 20:30	Report	Score by quarters: 5–4, 5–3, 3–2, 2–2			Marine Messe Fukuoka, Fukuoka; Referees: Nenad Peris (CRO), Vojin Putniković (SRB)
21 July 2023; 20:30	Report	three players 3	Goals	three players 3	Marine Messe Fukuoka, Fukuoka; Referees: Nenad Peris (CRO), Vojin Putniković (SRB)

Playoffs

23 July 2023; 14:00	Report	United States	13–10	Canada	Marine Messe Fukuoka, Fukuoka; Referees: Sebastien Dervieux (FRA), David Gómez (ESP)
23 July 2023; 14:00	Report	Score by quarters: 3–1, 3–4, 2–1, 5–4			Marine Messe Fukuoka, Fukuoka; Referees: Sebastien Dervieux (FRA), David Gómez (ESP)
23 July 2023; 14:00	Report	Daube 7	Goals	Constantin-Bicari 4	Marine Messe Fukuoka, Fukuoka; Referees: Sebastien Dervieux (FRA), David Gómez (ESP)

9–12th place semifinals

25 July 2023; 12:00	Report	Canada	5–13	Croatia	Marine Messe Fukuoka, Fukuoka; Referees: Veselin Mišković (MNE), Zhang Liang (CHN)
25 July 2023; 12:00	Report	Score by quarters: 2–3, 1–3, 1–5, 1–2			Marine Messe Fukuoka, Fukuoka; Referees: Veselin Mišković (MNE), Zhang Liang (CHN)
25 July 2023; 12:00	Report	five players 1	Goals	Butić, Lazić 3	Marine Messe Fukuoka, Fukuoka; Referees: Veselin Mišković (MNE), Zhang Liang (CHN)

Eleventh place game

27 July 2023; 09:00	Report	Canada	11–23	Japan	Marine Messe Fukuoka, Fukuoka; Referees: Vojin Putniković (SRB), Darren Spiritosanto (USA)
27 July 2023; 09:00	Report	Score by quarters: 3–6, 3–6, 2–8, 3–3			Marine Messe Fukuoka, Fukuoka; Referees: Vojin Putniković (SRB), Darren Spiritosanto (USA)
27 July 2023; 09:00	Report	Djerkovic 3	Goals	Inaba 5	Marine Messe Fukuoka, Fukuoka; Referees: Vojin Putniković (SRB), Darren Spiritosanto (USA)

=== Women's tournament ===
Team roster

The following is the Canadian roster.

Head coach: David Paradelo

- 1 Jessica Gaudreault GK
- 2 Marilia Mimides FP
- 3 Axelle Crevier FP
- 4 Emma Wright FP
- 5 Daphné Guèvremont FP
- 6 Blaire McDowell FP
- 7 Verica Bakoc FP
- 8 Elyse Lemay-Lavoie FP
- 9 Hayley McKelvey FP
- 10 Serena Browne FP
- 11 Kindred Paul FP
- 12 Shae La Roche FP
- 13 Rachael Jaffe GK
- Floranne Carroll FP

Group play

Pos	Team	Pld	W	PSW	PSL	L	GF	GA	GD	Pts	Qualification
1	Hungary	3	3	0	0	0	60	36	+24	9	Quarterfinals
2	Canada	3	2	0	0	1	40	34	+6	6	Playoffs
3	New Zealand	3	1	0	0	2	33	52	−19	3	Playoffs
4	Japan (H)	3	0	0	0	3	49	60	−11	0	

Source: Sportresult
Rules for classification: 1) points; 2) head-to-head points; 3) head-to-head goal difference; 4) head-to-head number of goals scored; 5) Goal difference.
(H) Host

16 July 2023; 20:30	Report	Hungary	11–10	Canada	Marine Messe Fukuoka, Fukuoka; Referees: Marta Cabanas (ESP), Zhang Liang (CHN)
16 July 2023; 20:30	Report	Score by quarters: 5–3, 2–2, 1–2, 3–3			Marine Messe Fukuoka, Fukuoka; Referees: Marta Cabanas (ESP), Zhang Liang (CHN)
16 July 2023; 20:30	Report	Keszthelyi 4	Goals	four players 2	Marine Messe Fukuoka, Fukuoka; Referees: Marta Cabanas (ESP), Zhang Liang (CHN)

18 July 2023; 16:00	Report	Canada	13–11	New Zealand	Marine Messe Fukuoka, Fukuoka; Referees: Marta Cabanas (ESP), Darren Spiritsanto (USA)
18 July 2023; 16:00	Report	Score by quarters: 7–4, 1–3, 3–0, 2–4			Marine Messe Fukuoka, Fukuoka; Referees: Marta Cabanas (ESP), Darren Spiritsanto (USA)
18 July 2023; 16:00	Report	La Roche 3	Goals	Howarth 4	Marine Messe Fukuoka, Fukuoka; Referees: Marta Cabanas (ESP), Darren Spiritsanto (USA)

20 July 2023; 19:00	Report	Canada	17–12	Japan	Marine Messe Fukuoka, Fukuoka; Referees: Adil Aimbetov (KAZ), Nicola Johnson (AUS)
20 July 2023; 19:00	Report	Score by quarters: 5–1, 3–3, 5–4, 4–4			Marine Messe Fukuoka, Fukuoka; Referees: Adil Aimbetov (KAZ), Nicola Johnson (AUS)
20 July 2023; 19:00	Report	Lemay-Lavoie 5	Goals	Arima, Kawaguchi 4	Marine Messe Fukuoka, Fukuoka; Referees: Adil Aimbetov (KAZ), Nicola Johnson (AUS)

Playoffs

22 July 2023; 18:30	Report	South Africa	6–21	Canada	Marine Messe Fukuoka, Fukuoka; Referees: Nicola Johnson (AUS), David Couper (NZL)
22 July 2023; 18:30	Report	Score by quarters: 1–6, 1–4, 1–4, 3–7			Marine Messe Fukuoka, Fukuoka; Referees: Nicola Johnson (AUS), David Couper (NZL)
22 July 2023; 18:30	Report	Thornton-Dibb 2	Goals	Wright 4	Marine Messe Fukuoka, Fukuoka; Referees: Nicola Johnson (AUS), David Couper (NZL)

Quarterfinals

24 July 2023; 16:30	Report	Netherlands	17–10	Canada	Marine Messe Fukuoka, Fukuoka; Referees: Marta Cabanas (ESP), Natalia Markopoulou (GRE)
24 July 2023; 16:30	Report	Score by quarters: 6–2, 5–3, 3–4, 3–1			Marine Messe Fukuoka, Fukuoka; Referees: Marta Cabanas (ESP), Natalia Markopoulou (GRE)
24 July 2023; 16:30	Report	three players 3	Goals	McKelvey 4	Marine Messe Fukuoka, Fukuoka; Referees: Marta Cabanas (ESP), Natalia Markopoulou (GRE)

5–8th place semifinals

26 July 2023; 14:00	Report	United States	16–4	Canada	Marine Messe Fukuoka, Fukuoka; Referees: Alessia Ferrari (ITA), Lee-Anne Stewart (RSA)
26 July 2023; 14:00	Report	Score by quarters: 5–1, 2–1, 6–1, 3–1			Marine Messe Fukuoka, Fukuoka; Referees: Alessia Ferrari (ITA), Lee-Anne Stewart (RSA)
26 July 2023; 14:00	Report	Flynn 5	Goals	Browne 2	Marine Messe Fukuoka, Fukuoka; Referees: Alessia Ferrari (ITA), Lee-Anne Stewart (RSA)

Seventh place game

28 July 2023; 11:30	Report	Canada	14–12 (PSO)	Greece	Marine Messe Fukuoka, Fukuoka; Referees: Nóra Debreceni (HUN), Nicola Johnson (AUS)
28 July 2023; 11:30	Report	Score by quarters: 4–1, 1–4, 4–1, 1–4 PSO: 4–2			Marine Messe Fukuoka, Fukuoka; Referees: Nóra Debreceni (HUN), Nicola Johnson (AUS)
28 July 2023; 11:30	Report	Wright 3	Goals	Xenaki 3	Marine Messe Fukuoka, Fukuoka; Referees: Nóra Debreceni (HUN), Nicola Johnson (AUS)
