= Canada at the 2024 World Aquatics Championships =

- Flag of Canada
- World Aquatics code: CAN
- National federation: Aquatic Federation of Canada

in Doha, Qatar
- Competitors: 64 in 6 sports
- Medals Ranked 7th: Gold 2 Silver 3 Bronze 6 Total 11

World Aquatics Championships appearances
- 1973; 1975; 1978; 1982; 1986; 1991; 1994; 1998; 2001; 2003; 2005; 2007; 2009; 2011; 2013; 2015; 2017; 2019; 2022; 2023; 2024; 2025

Canada competed at the 2024 World Aquatics Championships in Doha, Qatar from February 2 to 18, 2024.

== Athletes by discipline ==
The following is the number of competitors who participated at the Championships per discipline.

Sport	Men	Women	Total
Artistic swimming	0	11	11
Diving	4	4	8
High diving	1	3	4
Open water swimming	2	2	4
Swimming	9	13	22
Water polo	0	15	15
Total	16	48	64

== Medalists ==
Medal	Name	Sport	Event
1st place, gold medalist(s)	Jacqueline Simoneau	Artistic swimming	Women's solo free routine
1st place, gold medalist(s)	Finlay Knox	Swimming	Men's 200 metre individual medley
2nd place, silver medalist(s)	Jacqueline Simoneau	Artistic swimming	Women's solo technical routine
2nd place, silver medalist(s)	Sydney Pickrem	Swimming	Women's 200 metre individual medley
2nd place, silver medalist(s)	Molly Carlson	High diving	Women's 20m High Dive
3rd place, bronze medalist(s)	Jessica Macaulay	High diving	Women's 20m High Dive
3rd place, bronze medalist(s)	Rebecca Smith; Sarah Fournier; Katerine Savard; Taylor Ruck; Ella Jansen	Swimming	Women's 4 × 100 metre freestyle relay
3rd place, bronze medalist(s)	Ingrid Wilm; Sophie Angus; Rebecca Smith; Taylor Ruck; Sydney Pickrem; Katerine Savard	Swimming	Women's 4 × 100 metre medley relay
3rd place, bronze medalist(s)	Ingrid Wilm	Swimming	Women's 100 metre backstroke
3rd place, bronze medalist(s)	Ingrid Wilm	Swimming	Women's 50 metre backstroke
3rd place, bronze medalist(s)	Sydney Pickrem	Swimming	Women's 200 metre breaststroke

== Artistic swimming ==
Women

Athlete	Event	Preliminaries		Final	
Athlete	Event	Points	Rank	Points	Rank
Jacqueline Simoneau	Solo technical routine	260.7500	3 Q	269.2767	2nd place, silver medalist(s)
Jacqueline Simoneau	Solo free routine	248.9189	3 Q	264.8207	1st place, gold medalist(s)
Audrey Lamothe; Jacqueline Simoneau	Duet technical routine	243.9016	8 Q	247.1533	6
Audrey Lamothe; Jacqueline Simoneau	Duet free routine	234.9855	5 Q	239.0563	5

Mixed

Athlete	Event	Preliminaries		Final	
Athlete	Event	Points	Rank	Points	Rank
Sydney Carroll; Scarlett Finn; Audrey Lamothe; Raphaelle Plante; Kenzie Priddell; Claire Scheffel; Jacqueline Simoneau; Florence Tremblay	Team technical routine	259.4950	5 Q	253.3550	6
Sydney Carroll; Scarlett Finn; Jonnie Newman; Raphaelle Plante; Kenzie Priddell; Claire Scheffel; Florence Tremblay; Olena Verbinska	Team free routine	268.5854	9 Q	263.3980	7
Sydney Carroll; Scarlett Finn; Laurianne Imbeau; Jonnie Newman; Raphaelle Plante; Kenzie Priddell; Claire Scheffel; Olena Verbinska	Team acrobatic routine	220.8767	4 Q	222.1367	4

== Diving ==
Men

Athlete	Event	Preliminaries		Semifinals		Final	
Athlete	Event	Points	Rank	Points	Rank	Points	Rank
Cédric Fofana	1 m springboard	255.55	32	—N/a		Did not advance	
Cédric Fofana	3 m springboard	338.20	34	Did not advance			
Carson Paul	3 m springboard	330.80	36	Did not advance			
Rylan Wiens	10 m platform	415.95	9 Q	456.95	4 Q	489.20	5
Nathan Zsombor-Murray	10 m platform	433.55	7	415.40	8	452.25	9
Rylan Wiens; Nathan Zsombor-Murray	10 m synchro platform	—N/a				388.20	5

Women

Athlete	Event	Preliminaries		Semifinals		Final	
Athlete	Event	Points	Rank	Points	Rank	Points	Rank
Caeli McKay	10 m platform	318.40	5 Q	273.15	12 Q	310.05	8
Kate Miller	10 m platform	248.80	25	Did not advance			
Mia Vallée	1 m springboard	229.35	15	—N/a		Did not advance	
Mia Vallée	3 m springboard	226.45	29	Did not advance			
Pamela Ware	3 m springboard	238.10	25	Did not advance			
Mia Vallée; Pamela Ware	3 m synchro springboard	—N/a				201.27	15
Caeli McKay; Kate Miller	10 m synchro platform	—N/a				287.34	6

== High diving ==
Athlete	Event	Points	Rank
Frédéric Gagné	Men's high diving	238.40	21
Molly Carlson	Women's high diving	320.70	2nd place, silver medalist(s)
Simone Leathead	Women's high diving	279.70	7
Jessica Macaulay	Women's high diving	320.35	3rd place, bronze medalist(s)

== Open water swimming ==
Men

Athlete	Event	Time	Rank
Hau-Li Fan	Men's 5 km	55:12.4	41
Eric Hedlin	Men's 5 km	51:39.1	11
Hau-Li Fan	Men's 10 km	1:52:08.7	36
Eric Hedlin	Men's 10 km	1:50:17.9	31

Women

Athlete	Event	Time	Rank
Emma Finlin	Women's 5 km	59:04.4	23
Laila Oravsky	Women's 5 km	59:22.4	38
Emma Finlin	Women's 10 km	1:58:22.3	24
Laila Oravsky	Women's 10 km	2:09:16.4	51

Mixed

Athlete	Event	Time	Rank
Emma Finlin; Laila Oravsky; Eric Hedlin; Hau-Li Fan	Team relay	1:07:03.4	10

== Swimming ==
Canada entered 22 swimmers.

Men

Athlete	Event	Heat		Semifinal		Final	
Athlete	Event	Time	Rank	Time	Rank	Time	Rank
Javier Acevedo	100 metre freestyle	49.19	24	Did not advance			
Javier Acevedo	200 metre freestyle	1:48.89	31	Did not advance			
Javier Acevedo	50 metre backstroke	25.28	17	Did not advance			
Stephen Calkins	50 metre freestyle	23.15	44	Did not advance			
James Dergousoff	50 metre breaststroke	28.08	22	Did not advance			
James Dergousoff	100 metre breaststroke	1:00.77	23	Did not advance			
James Dergousoff	200 metre breaststroke	2:12.34	13 Q	2:12.59	16	Did not advance	
Raben Dommann	200 metre backstroke	1:59.10	15 Q	2:00.75	16	Did not advance	
Raben Dommann	200 metre butterfly	1:59.45	24	Did not advance			
Collyn Gagne	400 metre individual medley	4:18.74	10	—N/a		Did not advance	
Finlay Knox	50 metre butterfly	23.52	15 Q	23.25 NR	9	Did not advance	
Finlay Knox	100 metre butterfly	52.04	8 Q	52.07	12	Did not advance	
Finlay Knox	200 metre individual medley	1:59.48	4 Q	1:58.50	6 Q	1:56.64 NR	1st place, gold medalist(s)
Blake Tierney	100 metre backstroke	54.46	18	Did not advance			
Lorne Wigginton	400 metre freestyle	3:50.91	28	—N/a		Did not advance	
Lorne Wigginton	200 metre individual medley	2:00.63	14 Q	2:00.32	13	Did not advance	
Lorne Wigginton	400 metre individual medley	4:14.54	7 Q	—N/a		4:14.98	7
Javier Acevedo; Finlay Knox; Antoine Sauvé; Stephen Calkins	4 × 100 m freestyle relay	3:15.74	11	—N/a		Did not advance	
Finlay Knox; Javier Acevedo; Blake Tierney; Lorne Wigginton	4 × 200 m freestyle relay	7:13.29	10	—N/a		Did not advance	
Blake Tierney; James Dergousoff; Finlay Knox; Javier Acevedo	4 × 100 m medley relay	3:34.16	5 Q	—N/a		3:32.89	4

Women

Athlete	Event	Heat		Semifinal		Final	
Athlete	Event	Time	Rank	Time	Rank	Time	Rank
Sophie Angus	50 metre breaststroke	30.86	9 Q	30.87	12	Did not advance	
Sophie Angus	100 metre breaststroke	1:07.37	11 Q	1:06.66	8 Q	1:07.09	8
Tessa Cieplucha	400 metre individual medley	4:40.80	1 Q	—N/a		4:43.02	7
Ella Cosgrove	800 metre freestyle	8:43.33	16	—N/a		Did not advance	
Sarah Fournier	100 metre freestyle	56.39	26	Did not advance			
Ella Jansen	400 metre freestyle	4:17.01	21	—N/a		Did not advance	
Ella Jansen	200 metre butterfly	2:14.77	20	Did not advance			
Ella Jansen	400 metre individual medley	4:44.93	10	—N/a		Did not advance	
Ashley McMillan	200 metre individual medley	2:12.65	7 Q	2:12.23	8 Q	2:13.48	8
Sydney Pickrem	200 metre breaststroke	2:25.18	4 Q	2:23.77	3 Q	2:22.94	3rd place, bronze medalist(s)
Sydney Pickrem	200 metre individual medley	2:10.97	2 Q	2:08.76	2 Q	2:08.56	2nd place, silver medalist(s)
Taylor Ruck	50 metre freestyle	24.84	7 Q	24.72	8 Q	24.50	5
Katerine Savard	50 metre butterfly	26.47	17	Did not advance			
Katerine Savard	100 metre butterfly	59.24	15 Q	58.73	12	Did not advance	
Rebecca Smith	200 metre freestyle	1:59.00	13 Q	1:58.08	11	Did not advance	
Ingrid Wilm	50 metre backstroke	27.81	1 Q	27.68	4 Q	27.61	3rd place, bronze medalist(s)
Ingrid Wilm	100 metre backstroke	59.82	2 Q	59.55	2 Q	59.18	3rd place, bronze medalist(s)
Ingrid Wilm	200 metre backstroke	2:12.67	14 Q	2:11.88	13	Did not advance	
Rebecca Smith; Sarah Fournier; Katerine Savard; Taylor Ruck; Ella Jansen	4 × 100 m freestyle relay	3:39.75	3 Q	—N/a		3:37.95	3rd place, bronze medalist(s)
Rebecca Smith; Emma O'Croinin; Sienna Angove; Taylor Ruck; Katerine Savard; Ella Jansen	4 × 200 m freestyle relay	7:56.07	3 Q	—N/a		7:55.71	6
Ingrid Wilm; Sophie Angus; Rebecca Smith; Taylor Ruck; Sydney Pickrem; Katerine Savard	4 × 100 m freestyle relay	3:58.63	1 Q	—N/a		3:56.43	3rd place, bronze medalist(s)

Mixed

Athlete	Event	Heat		Semifinal		Final	
Athlete	Event	Time	Rank	Time	Rank	Time	Rank
Finlay Knox; Javier Acevedo; Taylor Ruck; Rebecca Smith	4 × 100 m freestyle relay	3:24.78	2 Q	—N/a		3:23.79	4
Blake Tierney; James Dergousoff; Katerine Savard; Taylor Ruck	4 × 100 m medley relay	3:47.99	9	—N/a		Did not advance	

== Water polo ==
Summary

Team	Event	Group stage				Playoff	Quarterfinal	Semifinal	Final / BM	
Team	Event	Opposition Score	Opposition Score	Opposition Score	Rank	Opposition Score	Opposition Score	Opposition Score	Opposition Score	Rank
Canada	Women's tournament	South Africa; W 24–2	Great Britain; W 20–4	Italy; L 8–12	2 QP	New Zealand; W 14–12	Spain; L 9–12	Australia; L 8–10	Italy; L 12–18	8

=== Women's tournament ===
Team roster

The following is the Canadian roster.

Head coach: David Paradelo

- 1 Jessica Gaudreault GK
- 2 Rae Lekness FP
- 3 Axelle Crevier D
- 4 Emma Wright CB
- 5 Daphne Guevremont FP
- 6 Blaire McDowell FP
- 7 Verica Bakoc D
- 8 Elyse Lemay-Lavoie FP
- 9 Hayley McKelvey CB
- 10 Serena Browne FP
- 11 Kindred Paul D
- 12 Shae La Roche D
- 13 Clara Vulpisi GK
- 14 Marilia Mimides FP
- 15 Floranne Carroll FP

Group play

Pos	Team	Pld	W	PSW	PSL	L	GF	GA	GD	Pts	Qualification
1	Italy	3	3	0	0	0	59	21	+38	9	Quarterfinals
2	Canada	3	2	0	0	1	52	19	+33	6	Playoffs
3	Great Britain	3	1	0	0	2	29	47	−18	3	Playoffs
4	South Africa	3	0	0	0	3	10	63	−53	0	13–16th place semifinals

Source: World Aquatics
Rules for classification: 1) points; 2) head-to-head points; 3) head-to-head goal difference; 4) head-to-head number of goals scored; 5) Goal difference.

4 February 2024; 20:30	Report	South Africa	2–24	Canada	Aspire Dome, Doha; Referees: Viktor Salnichenko (KAZ), Yuri Maciel (BRA)
4 February 2024; 20:30	Report	Score by quarters: 0–6, 0–3, 2–8, 0–7			Aspire Dome, Doha; Referees: Viktor Salnichenko (KAZ), Yuri Maciel (BRA)
4 February 2024; 20:30	Report	Meecham, Zondo 1	Goals	three players 5	Aspire Dome, Doha; Referees: Viktor Salnichenko (KAZ), Yuri Maciel (BRA)

6 February 2024; 12:00	Report	Canada	20–5	Great Britain	Aspire Dome, Doha; Referees: Natalia Markopoulou (GRE), Jennifer McCall (USA)
6 February 2024; 12:00	Report	Score by quarters: 6–1, 5–2, 3–0, 6–2			Aspire Dome, Doha; Referees: Natalia Markopoulou (GRE), Jennifer McCall (USA)
6 February 2024; 12:00	Report	Lemay-Lavoie 4	Goals	Falvey 2	Aspire Dome, Doha; Referees: Natalia Markopoulou (GRE), Jennifer McCall (USA)

8 February 2024; 12:00	Report	Italy	12–8	Canada	Aspire Dome, Doha; Referees: Jennifer McCall (USA), Zhang Liang (CHN)
8 February 2024; 12:00	Report	Score by quarters: 4–4, 4–2, 2–2, 2–0			Aspire Dome, Doha; Referees: Jennifer McCall (USA), Zhang Liang (CHN)
8 February 2024; 12:00	Report	Marletta 4	Goals	Bakoc, Wright 2	Aspire Dome, Doha; Referees: Jennifer McCall (USA), Zhang Liang (CHN)

Playoffs

10 February 2024; 19:00	Report	New Zealand	12–14	Canada	Aspire Dome, Doha; Referees: Nóra Debreceni (HUN), Viktor Salnichenko (KAZ)
10 February 2024; 19:00	Report	Score by quarters: 2–5, 3–5, 4–2, 3–2			Aspire Dome, Doha; Referees: Nóra Debreceni (HUN), Viktor Salnichenko (KAZ)
10 February 2024; 19:00	Report	Houghton 5	Goals	Crevier 3	Aspire Dome, Doha; Referees: Nóra Debreceni (HUN), Viktor Salnichenko (KAZ)

Quarterfinals

12 February 2024; 17:30	Report	Spain	12–9	Canada	Aspire Dome, Doha; Referees: Zhang Liang (CHN), Natalia Markopoulou (GRE)
12 February 2024; 17:30	Report	Score by quarters: 3–1, 4–1, 2–3, 3–4			Aspire Dome, Doha; Referees: Zhang Liang (CHN), Natalia Markopoulou (GRE)
12 February 2024; 17:30	Report	Forca 5	Goals	Crevier 3	Aspire Dome, Doha; Referees: Zhang Liang (CHN), Natalia Markopoulou (GRE)

5–8th place semifinals

14 February 2024; 12:00	Report	Australia	10–8	Canada	Aspire Dome, Doha; Referees: Darren Spiritosanto (USA), Sébastien Dervieux (FRA)
14 February 2024; 12:00	Report	Score by quarters: 3–1, 0–2, 2–3, 5–2			Aspire Dome, Doha; Referees: Darren Spiritosanto (USA), Sébastien Dervieux (FRA)
14 February 2024; 12:00	Report	Williams 3	Goals	Wright 3	Aspire Dome, Doha; Referees: Darren Spiritosanto (USA), Sébastien Dervieux (FRA)

Seventh place game

16 February 2024; 10:00	Report	Canada	12–18	Italy	Aspire Dome, Doha; Referees: Boris Margeta (SLO), Darren Spiritosanto (USA)
16 February 2024; 10:00	Report	Score by quarters: 4–5, 4–6, 1–2, 3–5			Aspire Dome, Doha; Referees: Boris Margeta (SLO), Darren Spiritosanto (USA)
16 February 2024; 10:00	Report	Bakoc 4	Goals	Bianconi 5	Aspire Dome, Doha; Referees: Boris Margeta (SLO), Darren Spiritosanto (USA)
