= United States at the 2023 World Aquatics Championships =

- Flag of the United States
- World Aquatics code: USA
- National federation: United States Aquatic Sports
- Website: usaquaticsports.org

in Fukuoka, Japan
- Competitors: 120 in 6 sports
- Medals Ranked 3rd: Gold 7 Silver 22 Bronze 15 Total 44

World Aquatics Championships appearances
- 1973; 1975; 1978; 1982; 1986; 1991; 1994; 1998; 2001; 2003; 2005; 2007; 2009; 2011; 2013; 2015; 2017; 2019; 2022; 2023; 2024; 2025

The United States competed at the 2023 World Aquatics Championships in Fukuoka, Japan from 14 to 30 July. The United States ranked first among all countries in medals (44) and ranked third in gold medals (7).

== Medalists ==
Medal	Name	Sport	Event	Date
1st place, gold medalist(s)	Kate Douglass	Swimming	Women's 200 m individual medley	24 July 2023
1st place, gold medalist(s)	Katie Ledecky	Swimming	Women's 1500 m freestyle	25 July 2023
1st place, gold medalist(s)	Ryan Murphy	Swimming	Men's 100 m backstroke	25 July 2023
1st place, gold medalist(s)	Katie Ledecky	Swimming	Women's 800 m freestyle	29 July 2023
1st place, gold medalist(s)	Hunter Armstrong	Swimming	Men's 50 m backstroke	30 July 2023
1st place, gold medalist(s)	Ryan Murphy; Nic Fink; Dare Rose; Jack Alexy; Hunter Armstrong; Josh Matheny; Thomas Heilman; Matt King	Swimming	Men's 4 × 100 m medley relay	30 July 2023
1st place, gold medalist(s)	Regan Smith; Lilly King; Gretchen Walsh; Kate Douglass; Katharine Berkoff; Lydia Jacoby; Torri Huske; Abbey Weitzeil	Swimming	Women's 4 × 100 m medley relay	30 July 2023
2nd place, silver medalist(s)	Kenneth Gaudet	Artistic swimming	Men's solo technical routine	17 July 2023
2nd place, silver medalist(s)	Anita Alvarez; Audrey Kwon; Keana Hunter; Nicole Dzurko; Calista Liu; Jaime Czarkowski; Daniella Ramirez; Bill May	Artistic swimming	Team acrobatic routine	17 July 2023
2nd place, silver medalist(s)	Katie Ledecky	Swimming	Women's 400 m freestyle	23 July 2023
2nd place, silver medalist(s)	Carson Foster	Swimming	Men's 400 m individual medley	23 July 2023
2nd place, silver medalist(s)	Gretchen Walsh; Abbey Weitzeil; Olivia Smoliga; Kate Douglass; Torri Huske; Maxine Parker	Swimming	Women's 4 × 100 m freestyle relay	23 July 2023
2nd place, silver medalist(s)	Nic Fink	Swimming	Men's 100 m breaststroke	24 July 2023
2nd place, silver medalist(s)	Alexandra Walsh	Swimming	Women's 200 m individual medley	24 July 2023
2nd place, silver medalist(s)	Regan Smith	Swimming	Women's 100 m backstroke	25 July 2023
2nd place, silver medalist(s)	Nic Fink	Swimming	Men's 50 m breaststroke	26 July 2023
2nd place, silver medalist(s)	Jack Alexy	Swimming	Men's 100 m freestyle	27 July 2023
2nd place, silver medalist(s)	Regan Smith	Swimming	Women's 50 m backstroke	27 July 2023
2nd place, silver medalist(s)	Erin Gemmell; Katie Ledecky; Bella Sims; Alex Shackell; Leah Smith; Anna Peplowski	Swimming	Women's 4 × 200 m freestyle relay	27 July 2023
2nd place, silver medalist(s)	Kate Douglass	Swimming	Women's 200 m breaststroke	28 July 2023
2nd place, silver medalist(s)	Ryan Murphy	Swimming	Men's 200 m backstroke	28 July 2023
2nd place, silver medalist(s)	Luke Hobson; Carson Foster; Jake Mitchell; Kieran Smith; Drew Kibler; Baylor Nelson; Henry McFadden	Swimming	Men's 4 × 200 m freestyle relay	28 July 2023
2nd place, silver medalist(s)	Jack Alexy	Swimming	Men's 50 m freestyle	29 July 2023
2nd place, silver medalist(s)	Regan Smith	Swimming	Women's 200 m backstroke	29 July 2023
2nd place, silver medalist(s)	Jack Alexy; Matt King; Abbey Weitzeil; Kate Douglass; Chris Guiliano; Olivia Smoliga; Bella Sims	Swimming	Mixed 4 × 100 m freestyle relay	29 July 2023
2nd place, silver medalist(s)	Justin Ress	Swimming	Men's 50 m backstroke	30 July 2023
2nd place, silver medalist(s)	Lilly King	Swimming	Women's 50 m breaststroke	30 July 2023
2nd place, silver medalist(s)	Bobby Finke	Swimming	Men's 1500 m freestyle	30 July 2023
2nd place, silver medalist(s)	Katie Grimes	Swimming	Women's 400 m individual medley	30 July 2023
3rd place, bronze medalist(s)	Katie Grimes	Open water swimming	Women's 10 km	15 July 2023
3rd place, bronze medalist(s)	Jessica Parratto; Delaney Schnell	Diving	Women's 10 m synchro platform	16 July 2023
3rd place, bronze medalist(s)	Daniella Ramirez; Jacklyn Luu; Ruby Remati; Jaime Czarkowski; Anita Alvarez; Natalia Vega Figueroa; Megumi Field; Audrey Kwon	Artistic swimming	Team technical routine	18 July 2023
3rd place, bronze medalist(s)	Kenneth Gaudet	Artistic swimming	Men's solo free routine	19 July 2023
3rd place, bronze medalist(s)	Ryan Held; Jack Alexy; Chris Guiliano; Matt King; Destin Lasco; Justin Ress	Swimming	Men's 4 × 100 m freestyle relay	23 July 2023
3rd place, bronze medalist(s)	Torri Huske	Swimming	Women's 100 m butterfly	24 July 2023
3rd place, bronze medalist(s)	Katharine Berkoff	Swimming	Women's 100 m backstroke	25 July 2023
3rd place, bronze medalist(s)	Hunter Armstrong	Swimming	Men's 100 m backstroke	25 July 2023
3rd place, bronze medalist(s)	Lydia Jacoby	Swimming	Women's 100 m breaststroke	25 July 2023
3rd place, bronze medalist(s)	Bobby Finke	Swimming	Men's 800 m freestyle	26 July 2023
3rd place, bronze medalist(s)	Ryan Murphy; Nic Fink; Torri Huske; Kate Douglass; Katharine Berkoff; Josh Matheny; Dare Rose; Abbey Weitzeil	Swimming	Mixed 4 × 100 m medley relay	26 July 2023
3rd place, bronze medalist(s)	Regan Smith	Swimming	Women's 200 m butterfly	27 July 2023
3rd place, bronze medalist(s)	Matt Fallon	Swimming	Men's 200 m breaststroke	28 July 2023
3rd place, bronze medalist(s)	Gretchen Walsh	Swimming	Women's 50 m butterfly	29 July 2023
3rd place, bronze medalist(s)	Dare Rose	Swimming	Men's 100 m butterfly	29 July 2023

== Awards ==
- 2023 World Aquatics Championships: Best Team

== Athletes by discipline ==
The following is the number of competitors who participated at the Championships per discipline.

Sport	Men	Women	Total
Artistic swimming	2	11	13
Diving	9	9	18
High diving	3	4	7
Open water swimming	3	2*	5*
Swimming	26	22*	48*
Water polo	15	15	30
Total	58	62	120

- Katie Grimes competed in both open water swimming and indoor swimming.

== Artistic swimming ==
Men

Athlete	Event	Preliminaries		Final	
Athlete	Event	Points	Rank	Points	Rank
Kenneth Gaudet	Solo technical routine	214.4916	2 Q	216.8000	2nd place, silver medalist(s)
Kenneth Gaudet	Solo free routine	179.7834	1 Q	179.5562	3rd place, bronze medalist(s)

Women

Athlete	Event	Preliminaries		Final	
Athlete	Event	Points	Rank	Points	Rank
Megumi Field; Ruby Remati	Duet technical routine	196.0066	17	Did not advance	
Megumi Field; Ruby Remati	Duet free routine	225.9459	3 Q	209.5187	7

Mixed

Athlete	Event	Preliminaries		Final	
Athlete	Event	Points	Rank	Points	Rank
Anita Alvarez; Jaime Czarkowski; Nicole Dzurko; Keana Hunter; Audrey Kwon; Calista Liu; Bill May; Daniella Ramirez	Team acrobatic routine	233.9333	2 Q	232.4033	2nd place, silver medalist(s)
Anita Alvarez; Jaime Czarkowski; Megumi Field; Audrey Kwon; Jacklyn Luu; Daniella Ramirez; Ruby Remati; Natalia Vega Figueroa	Team technical routine	248.7274	4 Q	273.7396	3rd place, bronze medalist(s)
Anita Alvarez; Jaime Czarkowski; Megumi Field; Audrey Kwon; Calista Liu; Jacklyn Luu; Daniella Ramirez; Natalia Vega Figueroa	Team free routine	251.9500	5 Q	218.6605	9

== Diving ==
On 24 May 2023, 18 athletes were named to the World Championships roster.

Men

Athlete	Event	Preliminaries		Semifinals		Final	
Athlete	Event	Points	Rank	Points	Rank	Points	Rank
Andrew Capobianco	3 m springboard	385.40	17 Q	427.35	9 Q	448.00	4
Tyler Downs	3 m springboard	416.65	8 Q	415.30	10 Q	389.00	9
Max Flory	10 m platform	384.95	16 Q	382.95	16	Did not advance	
Brandon Loschiavo	10 m platform	356.55	23	Did not advance			
Jack Ryan	1 m springboard	363.75	8 Q	—N/a		376.35	9
Lyle Yost	1 m springboard	355.05	13	—N/a		Did not advance	
Tyler Downs; Greg Duncan	3 m synchronized springboard	362.94	7 Q	—N/a		385.23	4
Brandon Loschiavo; Jordan Rzepka	10 m synchronized platform	359.46	10 Q	—N/a		375.90	6

Women

Athlete	Event	Preliminaries		Semifinals		Final	
Athlete	Event	Points	Rank	Points	Rank	Points	Rank
Nike Agunbiade	10 m platform	264.15	22	Did not advance			
Sarah Bacon	3 m springboard	292.95	7 Q	320.10	5 Q	293.20	11
Hailey Hernandez	1 m springboard	239.40	10 Q	—N/a		259.20	7
Hailey Hernandez	3 m springboard	277.45	16 Q	291.75	12 Q	307.15	6
Joslyn Oakley	1 m springboard	231.95	16	—N/a		Did not advance	
Delaney Schnell	10 m platform	310.40	8 Q	336.55	4 Q	313.95	6
Sarah Bacon; Kassidy Cook	3 m synchronized springboard	307.29	2 Q	—N/a		285.39	4
Jessica Parratto; Delaney Schnell	10 m synchronized platform	294.12	2 Q	—N/a		294.42	3rd place, bronze medalist(s)

Mixed

Athlete	Event	Final	
Athlete	Event	Points	Rank
Krysta Palmer; Jack Ryan	3 m synchronized springboard	263.88	8
Kaylee Bishop; Max Weinrich	10 m synchronized platform	256.02	11
Krysta Palmer; Jack Ryan; Jessica Parratto; Jordan Rzepka	Team event	421.40	5

== High diving ==
Seven athletes were named to the World Championships roster.

Men

Athlete	Event	Points	Rank
David Colturi	Men's high diving	348.90	12
Matt Cooper	Men's high diving	363.15	9
James Lichtenstein	Men's high diving	390.20	7

Women

Athlete	Event	Points	Rank
Meili Carpenter	Women's high diving	299.55	5
Susanna Fish	Women's high diving	203.10	16
Ellie Smart	Women's high diving	248.50	10
Maria Smirnov	Women's high diving	208.35	14

== Open water swimming ==
On 23 June 2023, five athletes were named to the World Championships roster.

Men

Athlete	Event	Time	Rank
Brennan Gravley	Men's 5 km	57:20.0	28
Brennan Gravley	Men's 10 km	1:54:13.0	30
Dylan Gravley	Men's 5 km	56:48.5	17
Joey Tepper	Men's 10 km	1:57:23.9	36

Women

Athlete	Event	Time	Rank
Mariah Denigan	Women's 5 km	1:01:18.3	18
Mariah Denigan	Women's 10 km	2:03:13.5	8
Katie Grimes	Women's 10 km	2:02:42.3	3rd place, bronze medalist(s)

Mixed

Athlete	Event	Time	Rank
Mariah Denigan; Brennan Gravley; Katie Grimes; Joey Tepper	Team relay	1:13:58.6	9

== Swimming ==
On 1 July 2023, 48 athletes were named to the World Championships roster. The United States ranked first among all countries in swimming medals (38) and ranked second in swimming gold medals (7). Kate Douglass led the American athletes in medals, with two golds, three silvers, and one bronze.

Men

Athlete	Event	Heat		Semifinal		Final	
Athlete	Event	Time	Rank	Time	Rank	Time	Rank
Jack Alexy	50 m freestyle	21.73	4 Q	21.60	2 Q	21.57	2nd place, silver medalist(s)
Jack Alexy	100 m freestyle	47.68	2 Q	48.06	8 Q	47.31	2nd place, silver medalist(s)
Hunter Armstrong	50 m backstroke	24.49	3 Q	24.41	2 Q	24.05	1st place, gold medalist(s)
Hunter Armstrong	100 m backstroke	53.94	16 Q	53.21	8 Q	52.58	3rd place, bronze medalist(s)
Shaine Casas	50 m butterfly	23.69	29	Did not advance			
Shaine Casas	200 m individual medley	1:58.56	11 Q	1:57.23	8 Q	1:56.35	4
Charlie Clark	1500 m freestyle	14:57.16	11	—N/a		Did not advance	
Ross Dant	800 m freestyle	7:54.23	19	—N/a		Did not advance	
Matt Fallon	200 m breaststroke	2:09.32	3 Q	2:07.90	3 Q	2:07.74	3rd place, bronze medalist(s)
Nic Fink	50 m breaststroke	26.91	6 Q	26.95	6 Q	26.59	2nd place, silver medalist(s)
Nic Fink	100 m breaststroke	59.38	5 Q	58.88	3 Q	58.72	2nd place, silver medalist(s)
Bobby Finke	800 m freestyle	7:43.87	5 Q	—N/a		7:38.67 AM	3rd place, bronze medalist(s)
Bobby Finke	1500 m freestyle	14:43.06	1 Q	—N/a		14:31.59 AM	2nd place, silver medalist(s)
Carson Foster	200 m butterfly	1:55.36	6 Q	1:53.85	1 Q	1:54.74	6
Carson Foster	200 m individual medley	1:58.24	7 Q	1:56.55	3 Q	1:56.43	5
Carson Foster	400 m individual medley	4:09.83	1 Q	—N/a		4:06.56	2nd place, silver medalist(s)
Chris Guiliano	100 m freestyle	48.41	18	Did not advance			
Thomas Heilman	100 m butterfly	51.77	16 S/off	Did not advance			
Thomas Heilman	200 m butterfly	1:55.59	8 Q	1:54.57	7 Q	1:53.82	4
Ryan Held	50 m freestyle	21.91	9 Q	21.91	9 S/off	21.72	5
Luke Hobson	200 m freestyle	1:45.69	1 Q	1:44.87	2 Q	1:45.09	5
David Johnston	400 m freestyle	3:48.68	17	—N/a		Did not advance	
Chase Kalisz	400 m individual medley	4:12.37	6 Q	—N/a		4:10.23	4
Destin Lasco	200 m backstroke	1:57.84	8 Q	1:59.18	16	Did not advance	
Josh Matheny	100 m breaststroke	59.40	6 Q	59.20	6 Q	59.45	7
Josh Matheny	200 m breaststroke	2:09.90	6 Q	2:09.04	6 Q	2:10.41	8
Ryan Murphy	100 m backstroke	53.43	4 Q	52.56	3 Q	52.22	1st place, gold medalist(s)
Ryan Murphy	200 m backstroke	1:57.37	4 Q	1:56.02	4 Q	1:54.83	2nd place, silver medalist(s)
Justin Ress	50 m backstroke	24.18	1 Q	24.35	1 Q	24.24	2nd place, silver medalist(s)
Dare Rose	50 m butterfly	23.27	9 Q	22.79	2 Q	23.01	6
Dare Rose	100 m butterfly	51.17	6 Q	50.53	1 Q	50.46	3rd place, bronze medalist(s)
Kieran Smith	200 m freestyle	1:46.38	6 Q	1:45.96	7 Q	1:46.10	7
Kieran Smith	400 m freestyle	3:45.77	9	—N/a		Did not advance	
Ryan Held; Jack Alexy; Chris Guiliano; Matt King; Destin Lasco; Justin Ress	4 × 100 m freestyle relay	3:11.63	1 Q	—N/a		3:10.81	3rd place, bronze medalist(s)
Luke Hobson; Carson Foster; Jake Mitchell; Kieran Smith; Drew Kibler; Baylor Nelson; Henry McFadden	4 × 200 m freestyle relay	7:06.12	2 Q	—N/a		7:00.02	2nd place, silver medalist(s)
Ryan Murphy; Nic Fink; Dare Rose; Jack Alexy; Hunter Armstrong; Josh Matheny; Thomas Heilman; Matt King	4 × 100 m medley relay	3:30.51	1 Q	—N/a		3:27.20 CR	1st place, gold medalist(s)

Women

Athlete	Event	Heat		Semifinal		Final	
Athlete	Event	Time	Rank	Time	Rank	Time	Rank
Katharine Berkoff	50 m backstroke	27.56	3 Q	27.49	4 Q	27.38	5
Katharine Berkoff	100 m backstroke	59.04	3 Q	58.60	3 Q	58.25	3rd place, bronze medalist(s)
Jillian Cox	800 m freestyle	8:22.20	8 Q	—N/a		8:19.73	6
Kate Douglass	100 m freestyle	54.41	11 Q	53.38	6 Q	52.81	4
Kate Douglass	200 m breaststroke	2:25.50	9 Q	2:21.99	3 Q	2:21.23	2nd place, silver medalist(s)
Kate Douglass	200 m individual medley	2:09.17	1 Q	2:10.38	6 Q	2:07.17	1st place, gold medalist(s)
Katie Grimes	1500 m freestyle	16:01.47	7 Q	—N/a		16:04.21	8
Katie Grimes	400 m individual medley	4:38.39	5 Q	—N/a		4:31.41	2nd place, silver medalist(s)
Torri Huske	50 m butterfly	25.98	9 Q	25.75	7 Q	25.64	5
Torri Huske	100 m butterfly	57.66	6 Q	56.76	2 Q	56.61	3rd place, bronze medalist(s)
Lydia Jacoby	50 m breaststroke	30.44	11 Q	30.40	9	Did not advance	
Lydia Jacoby	100 m breaststroke	1:06.71	14 Q	1:06.29	7 Q	1:05.94	3rd place, bronze medalist(s)
Lilly King	50 m breaststroke	30.05	3 Q	29.72	2 Q	29.94	2nd place, silver medalist(s)
Lilly King	100 m breaststroke	1:05.93	4 Q	1:05.45	2 Q	1:06.02	4
Lilly King	200 m breaststroke	2:23.68	4 Q	2:22.68	4 Q	2:22.25	4
Katie Ledecky	400 m freestyle	4:00.80	1 Q	—N/a		3:58.73	2nd place, silver medalist(s)
Katie Ledecky	800 m freestyle	8:15.60	1 Q	—N/a		8:08.87	1st place, gold medalist(s)
Katie Ledecky	1500 m freestyle	15:41.22	1 Q	—N/a		15:26.27	1st place, gold medalist(s)
Lindsay Looney	200 m butterfly	2:09.27	9 Q	2:07.72	8 Q	2:07.90	8
Bella Sims	200 m freestyle	1:57.71	11 Q	1:55.45	4 Q	1:56.00	6
Bella Sims	400 m freestyle	4:04.25	7 Q	—N/a		4:05.37	8
Regan Smith	50 m backstroke	27.31	1 Q	27.10	1 Q AM	27.11	2nd place, silver medalist(s)
Regan Smith	100 m backstroke	58.47	1 Q	58.33	1 Q	57.78	2nd place, silver medalist(s)
Regan Smith	200 m backstroke	2:07.24	1 Q	2:07.52	2 Q	2:04.94	2nd place, silver medalist(s)
Regan Smith	200 m butterfly	2:10.80	15 Q	2:06.83	2 Q	2:06.58	3rd place, bronze medalist(s)
Alexandra Walsh	200 m individual medley	2:09.65	3 Q	2:08.27	1 Q	2:07.97	2nd place, silver medalist(s)
Alexandra Walsh	400 m individual medley	4:39.42	7 Q	—N/a		4:34.46	4
Gretchen Walsh	50 m freestyle	24.83	13 Q	24.71	11	Did not advance	
Gretchen Walsh	50 m butterfly	25.78	6 Q	25.48	3 Q	25.46	3rd place, bronze medalist(s)
Gretchen Walsh	100 m butterfly	57.74	8 Q	57.14	6 Q	57.58	8
Claire Weinstein	200 m freestyle	1:57.93	12 Q	1:57.03	12	Did not advance	
Abbey Weitzeil	50 m freestyle	24.29	3 Q	24.27	4 Q	24.32	4
Abbey Weitzeil	100 m freestyle	53.25	2 Q	53.36	5 Q	53.34	6
Rhyan White	200 m backstroke	2:09.68	7 Q	2:09.13	7 Q	2:08.43	6
Gretchen Walsh; Abbey Weitzeil; Olivia Smoliga; Kate Douglass; Torri Huske; Maxine Parker	4 × 100 m freestyle relay	3:33.34	2 Q	—N/a		3:31.93	2nd place, silver medalist(s)
Erin Gemmell; Katie Ledecky; Bella Sims; Alex Shackell; Leah Smith; Anna Peplowski	4 × 200 m freestyle relay	7:46.36	1 Q	—N/a		7:41.38	2nd place, silver medalist(s)
Regan Smith; Lilly King; Gretchen Walsh; Kate Douglass; Katharine Berkoff; Lydia Jacoby; Torri Huske; Abbey Weitzeil	4 x 100 m medley relay	3:56.31	2 Q	—N/a		3:52.08	1st place, gold medalist(s)

Mixed

Athlete	Event	Heat		Final	
Athlete	Event	Time	Rank	Time	Rank
Jack Alexy; Matt King; Abbey Weitzeil; Kate Douglass; Chris Guiliano; Olivia Smoliga; Bella Sims	4 × 100 m freestyle relay	3:23.85	2 Q	3:20.82	2nd place, silver medalist(s)
Ryan Murphy; Nic Fink; Torri Huske; Kate Douglass; Katharine Berkoff; Josh Matheny; Dare Rose; Abbey Weitzeil	4 × 100 m medley relay	3:40.47	1 Q	3:40.19	3rd place, bronze medalist(s)

== Water polo ==
Summary

Team	Event	Group stage				Playoff	Quarterfinal	Semifinal	Final / BM	
Team	Event	Opposition Score	Opposition Score	Opposition Score	Rank	Opposition Score	Opposition Score	Opposition Score	Opposition Score	Rank
United States	Men's tournament	Kazakhstan; W 18–5	Australia; W 16–8	Greece; L 14–15	2 QP	Canada; W 13–10	Hungary; L 12–13	France; L 16–18	Montenegro; W 17–15	7
United States	Women's tournament	China; W 15–6	Australia; W 9–5	France; W 16–5	1 Q	—N/a	Italy; L 7–8	Canada; W 16–4	Hungary; W 15–13	5

=== Men's tournament ===
Team roster

The following is the American roster.

Head coach: Dejan Udovičić

- 1 Adrian Weinberg GK
- 2 Johnny Hooper FP
- 3 Tommy Gruwell FP
- 4 Tyler Abramson FP
- 5 Hannes Daube FP
- 6 Luca Cupido FP
- 7 Ben Hallock FP
- 8 Dylan Woodhead FP
- 9 Alex Bowen FP
- 10 Chase Dodd FP
- 11 Ryder Dodd FP
- 12 Max Irving FP
- 13 Drew Holland GK
- Marko Vavic FP
- Quinn Woodhead FP

Group play

Pos	Team	Pld	W	PSW	PSL	L	GF	GA	GD	Pts	Qualification
1	Greece	3	3	0	0	0	46	25	+21	9	Quarterfinals
2	United States	3	2	0	0	1	48	28	+20	6	Playoffs
3	Australia	3	1	0	0	2	39	35	+4	3	Playoffs
4	Kazakhstan	3	0	0	0	3	13	58	−45	0	

Source: Sportresult
Rules for classification: 1) points; 2) head-to-head points; 3) head-to-head goal difference; 4) head-to-head number of goals scored; 5) Goal difference.

17 July 2023; 09:00	Report	Kazakhstan	5–18	United States	Marine Messe Fukuoka, Fukuoka; Referees: Chisato Kurosaki (JPN), David Gómez (ESP)
17 July 2023; 09:00	Report	Score by quarters: 1–5, 4–4, 0–4, 0–5			Marine Messe Fukuoka, Fukuoka; Referees: Chisato Kurosaki (JPN), David Gómez (ESP)
17 July 2023; 09:00	Report	Markovich 3	Goals	Abramson 5	Marine Messe Fukuoka, Fukuoka; Referees: Chisato Kurosaki (JPN), David Gómez (ESP)

19 July 2023; 20:30	Report	United States	16–8	Australia	Marine Messe Fukuoka, Fukuoka; Referees: Boris Margeta (SLO), Vojin Putniković (SRB)
19 July 2023; 20:30	Report	Score by quarters: 3–4, 3–2, 4–1, 6–1			Marine Messe Fukuoka, Fukuoka; Referees: Boris Margeta (SLO), Vojin Putniković (SRB)
19 July 2023; 20:30	Report	Daube 5	Goals	Pavillard, Power 3	Marine Messe Fukuoka, Fukuoka; Referees: Boris Margeta (SLO), Vojin Putniković (SRB)

21 July 2023; 13:30	Report	United States	14–15	Greece	Marine Messe Fukuoka, Fukuoka; Referees: Boris Margeta (SLO), Frank Ohme (GER)
21 July 2023; 13:30	Report	Score by quarters: 3–3, 6–1, 2–4, 3–7			Marine Messe Fukuoka, Fukuoka; Referees: Boris Margeta (SLO), Frank Ohme (GER)
21 July 2023; 13:30	Report	Irving 6	Goals	Genidounias, Papanastasiou 4	Marine Messe Fukuoka, Fukuoka; Referees: Boris Margeta (SLO), Frank Ohme (GER)

Playoffs

23 July 2023; 14:00	Report	United States	13–10	Canada	Marine Messe Fukuoka, Fukuoka; Referees: Sebastien Dervieux (FRA), David Gómez (ESP)
23 July 2023; 14:00	Report	Score by quarters: 3–1, 3–4, 2–1, 5–4			Marine Messe Fukuoka, Fukuoka; Referees: Sebastien Dervieux (FRA), David Gómez (ESP)
23 July 2023; 14:00	Report	Daube 7	Goals	Constantin-Bicari 4	Marine Messe Fukuoka, Fukuoka; Referees: Sebastien Dervieux (FRA), David Gómez (ESP)

Quarterfinals

25 July 2023; 18:00	Report	Hungary	13–12	United States	Marine Messe Fukuoka, Fukuoka; Referees: Adrian-Tiberiu Alexandrescu (ROU), Vojin Putniković (SRB)
25 July 2023; 18:00	Report	Score by quarters: 4–4, 3–1, 3–2, 3–5			Marine Messe Fukuoka, Fukuoka; Referees: Adrian-Tiberiu Alexandrescu (ROU), Vojin Putniković (SRB)
25 July 2023; 18:00	Report	Zalánki 6	Goals	Bowen 4	Marine Messe Fukuoka, Fukuoka; Referees: Adrian-Tiberiu Alexandrescu (ROU), Vojin Putniković (SRB)

5–8th place semifinals

27 July 2023; 15:30	Report	United States	16–18 (PSO)	France	Marine Messe Fukuoka, Fukuoka; Referees: Michiel Zwartt (NED), David Gómez (ESP)
27 July 2023; 15:30	Report	Score by quarters: 3–1, 3–3, 5–4, 2–5 PSO: 3–5			Marine Messe Fukuoka, Fukuoka; Referees: Michiel Zwartt (NED), David Gómez (ESP)
27 July 2023; 15:30	Report	Bowen 5	Goals	Crousillat, Vernoux 3	Marine Messe Fukuoka, Fukuoka; Referees: Michiel Zwartt (NED), David Gómez (ESP)

Seventh place game

29 July 2023; 11:30	Report	Montenegro	15–17 (PSO)	United States	Marine Messe Fukuoka, Fukuoka; Referees: Matan Schwartz (ISR), Zhang Liang (CHN)
29 July 2023; 11:30	Report	Score by quarters: 3–3, 4–4, 3–3, 2–2 PSO: 3–5			Marine Messe Fukuoka, Fukuoka; Referees: Matan Schwartz (ISR), Zhang Liang (CHN)
29 July 2023; 11:30	Report	three players 2	Goals	Hallock 4	Marine Messe Fukuoka, Fukuoka; Referees: Matan Schwartz (ISR), Zhang Liang (CHN)

=== Women's tournament ===
Team roster

The following is the American roster.

Head coach: Adam Krikorian

- 1 Ashleigh Johnson GK
- 2 Maddie Musselman FP
- 3 Tara Prentice FF
- 4 Rachel Fattal FP
- 5 Jenna Flynn FP
- 6 Maggie Steffens FP
- 7 Jewel Roemer FP
- 8 Ryann Neushul FP
- 9 Emily Ausmus FP
- 10 Kaleigh Gilchrist FP
- 11 Bayley Weber FP
- 12 Jordan Raney FP
- 13 Amanda Longan GK
- Jovana Sekulic FP
- Ellen Woodhead FP

Group play

Pos	Team	Pld	W	PSW	PSL	L	GF	GA	GD	Pts	Qualification
1	United States	3	3	0	0	0	40	16	+24	9	Quarterfinals
2	Australia	3	2	0	0	1	26	24	+2	6	Playoffs
3	France	3	1	0	0	2	25	37	−12	3	Playoffs
4	China	3	0	0	0	3	24	38	−14	0	

Source: Sportresult
Rules for classification: 1) points; 2) head-to-head points; 3) head-to-head goal difference; 4) head-to-head number of goals scored; 5) Goal difference.

16 July 2023; 09:00	Report	United States	15–6	China	Marine Messe Fukuoka, Fukuoka; Referees: Nóra Debreceni (HUN), Frank Ohme (GER)
16 July 2023; 09:00	Report	Score by quarters: 1–0, 6–2, 3–1, 5–3			Marine Messe Fukuoka, Fukuoka; Referees: Nóra Debreceni (HUN), Frank Ohme (GER)
16 July 2023; 09:00	Report	Musselman 4	Goals	Zhang Jin. 3	Marine Messe Fukuoka, Fukuoka; Referees: Nóra Debreceni (HUN), Frank Ohme (GER)

18 July 2023; 17:30	Report	Australia	5–9	United States	Marine Messe Fukuoka, Fukuoka; Referees: Natalia Markopoulou (GRE), Nóra Debreceni (HUN)
18 July 2023; 17:30	Report	Score by quarters: 3–5, 0–0, 1–3, 1–1			Marine Messe Fukuoka, Fukuoka; Referees: Natalia Markopoulou (GRE), Nóra Debreceni (HUN)
18 July 2023; 17:30	Report	Williams 3	Goals	three players 2	Marine Messe Fukuoka, Fukuoka; Referees: Natalia Markopoulou (GRE), Nóra Debreceni (HUN)

20 July 2023; 16:00	Report	France	5–16	United States	Marine Messe Fukuoka, Fukuoka; Referees: Chisato Kurosaki (JPN), Alessia Ferrari (ITA)
20 July 2023; 16:00	Report	Score by quarters: 1–5, 1–2, 0–4, 3–5			Marine Messe Fukuoka, Fukuoka; Referees: Chisato Kurosaki (JPN), Alessia Ferrari (ITA)
20 July 2023; 16:00	Report	Bouloukbachi 2	Goals	Prentice 4	Marine Messe Fukuoka, Fukuoka; Referees: Chisato Kurosaki (JPN), Alessia Ferrari (ITA)

Quarterfinals

24 July 2023; 15:00	Report	United States	7–8	Italy	Marine Messe Fukuoka, Fukuoka; Referees: Matan Schwartz (ISR), Zhang Liang (CHN)
24 July 2023; 15:00	Report	Score by quarters: 2–3, 2–1, 2–2, 1–2			Marine Messe Fukuoka, Fukuoka; Referees: Matan Schwartz (ISR), Zhang Liang (CHN)
24 July 2023; 15:00	Report	Steffens 4	Goals	Giustini 3	Marine Messe Fukuoka, Fukuoka; Referees: Matan Schwartz (ISR), Zhang Liang (CHN)

5–8th place semifinals

26 July 2023; 14:00	Report	United States	16–4	Canada	Marine Messe Fukuoka, Fukuoka; Referees: Alessia Ferrari (ITA), Lee-Anne Stewart (RSA)
26 July 2023; 14:00	Report	Score by quarters: 5–1, 2–1, 6–1, 3–1			Marine Messe Fukuoka, Fukuoka; Referees: Alessia Ferrari (ITA), Lee-Anne Stewart (RSA)
26 July 2023; 14:00	Report	Flynn 5	Goals	Browne 2	Marine Messe Fukuoka, Fukuoka; Referees: Alessia Ferrari (ITA), Lee-Anne Stewart (RSA)

Fifth place game

28 July 2023; 16:30	Report	United States	15–13 (PSO)	Hungary	Marine Messe Fukuoka, Fukuoka; Referees: Zhang Liang (CHN), Marta Cabanas (ESP)
28 July 2023; 16:30	Report	Score by quarters: 4–2, 1–3, 5–4, 1–2 PSO: 4–2			Marine Messe Fukuoka, Fukuoka; Referees: Zhang Liang (CHN), Marta Cabanas (ESP)
28 July 2023; 16:30	Report	Raney 3	Goals	Keszthelyi 4	Marine Messe Fukuoka, Fukuoka; Referees: Zhang Liang (CHN), Marta Cabanas (ESP)
