= Artistic swimming at the 2023 World Aquatics Championships – Team technical routine =

Team technical routine at the 2023 World Aquatics Championships
- Venue: Marine Messe Fukuoka
- Location: Fukuoka, Japan
- Dates: 16 July (preliminary); 18 July (final)
- Competitors: 176 from 22 nations
- Teams: 22
- Winning points: 281.6893

Medalists
gold medal	Cristina Arámbula; Marina García Polo; Meritxell Mas; Alisa Ozhogina; Paula Ramírez; Sara Saldaña; Iris Tió; Blanca Toledano	Spain
silver medal	Linda Cerruti; Marta Iacoacci; Sofia Mastroianni; Enrica Piccoli; Lucrezia Ruggiero; Isotta Sportelli; Giulia Vernice; Francesca Zunino	Italy
bronze medal	Anita Álvarez; Jaime Czarkowski; Megumi Field; Audrey Kwon; Jacklyn Luu; Daniella Ramirez; Ruby Remati; Natalia Vega	United States

The team technical routine was an artistic swimming competition at the 2023 World Aquatics Championships was held on 16 and 18 July 2023.

== Results ==
The preliminary round was started on 16 July at 10:00. The final was held on 18 July at 19:30.

Green denotes finalists

Rank	Nation	Preliminary		Final	
Rank	Nation	Points	Rank	Points	Rank
1st place, gold medalist(s)	Spain	246.7484	6	281.6893	1
2nd place, silver medalist(s)	Italy	251.5379	3	274.5155	2
3rd place, bronze medalist(s)	United States	248.7274	4	273.7396	3
4	Japan	235.2972	7	260.1055	4
5	Greece	261.7013	2	259.4729	5
6	Mexico	219.5325	9	257.1380	6
7	China	304.3992	1	253.4558	7
8	Israel	247.1383	5	248.4117	8
9	France	208.6443	10	248.1573	9
10	Egypt	195.2551	12	214.1084	10
11	Ukraine	230.0000	8	202.7401	11
12	Australia	200.7701	11	196.4087	12
13	Singapore	192.3279	13	Did not advance	
14	Canada	190.7666	14	Did not advance	
15	Great Britain	186.8912	15	Did not advance	
16	Slovakia	180.9629	16	Did not advance	
17	Kazakhstan	179.5535	17	Did not advance	
18	Chile	176.9279	18	Did not advance	
19	New Zealand	162.9192	19	Did not advance	
20	Costa Rica	162.0811	20	Did not advance	
21	Macau	161.7933	21	Did not advance	
22	Thailand	152.9763	22	Did not advance	
