= Artistic swimming at the 2023 Pan American Games =

- Artistic swimming pictogram
- Venue: Aquatic Center
- Start date: October 31, 2023
- End date: November 3, 2023
- No. of events: 2 (1 women, 1 open)
- Competitors: 80 from 12 nations

Artistic swimming competitions at the 2023 Pan American Games in Santiago, Chile were held between October 31 and November 3, 2023, at the Aquatic Center in the National Stadium Park cluster.

A total of two events, the duet and team, will be contested. The duet will be open to women, while the team event will be a mixed competition, with men being allowed to compete for the first time ever. A total of 80 athletes from 12 nations will compete.

A total of ten quotas will be awarded for the artistic swimming competitions at the 2024 Summer Olympics in Paris, France.

== Qualification ==
A total of 80 artistic swimmers will qualify to compete at the games. As host nation, Chile qualifies the maximum team size of nine athletes. Seven other teams will qualify (each with nine athletes). Each team will also be required to compete in the duet event with athletes already qualified for the team event. A further four countries will qualify a duet only.

== Participating nations ==
A total of 12 countries qualified athletes.

- Argentina (2)
- Aruba (2)
- Brazil (9)
- Canada (9)
- Chile (9)
- Colombia (9)
- Costa Rica (2)
- Cuba (9)
- El Salvador (9)
- Mexico (9)
- United States (9)
- Uruguay (2)

== Medal summary ==
=== Medal table ===
Rank	Nation	Gold	Silver	Bronze	Total
1	Mexico	2	0	0	2
2	United States	0	2	0	2
3	Brazil	0	0	1	1
3	Canada	0	0	1	1
Totals (4 entries)		2	2	2	6

=== Medalists ===
Event	Gold	Silver	Bronze
Duet	Mexico; Nuria Diosdado; Joana Jiménez	United States; Megumi Field; Ruby Remati	Brazil; Laura Miccuci; Gabriela Regly
Team	Mexico; Regina Alferez; Marla Arellano; Nuria Diosdado; Daniela Estrada; Itzamary González; Luisa Jailib; Joana Jiménez; Jessica Sobrino; Pamela Toscano	United States; Anita Alvarez; Jaime Czarkowski; Megumi Field; Audrey Kwon; Calista Liu; Jacklyn Luu; Bill May; Dani Ramirez; Ruby Remati	Canada; Sydney Carroll; Scarlett Finn; Audrey Lamothe; Jonnie Newman; Raphaelle Plante; Kenzie Priddell; Claire Scheffel; Florence Tremblay; Olena Verbinska

== 2024 Summer Olympics Qualification ==
This event is a direct qualification event for the 2024 Summer Olympics. A total of 10 quota places (eight for one team, and two for one pair) will be awarded to the winner of each respective event.

Event	Qualification path	Quotas	NOC
Team	One NOC of the highest placed team, will earn eight women’s quota places for one team.	8 (1 team)	Mexico
Duet	One NOC of the highest placed unqualified duet pair, will earn two women’s quota places for one duet pair.	2 (1 duet)	United States
Total quota places awarded		10	

== See also ==
- Artistic swimming at the 2024 Summer Olympics
