= Artistic swimming at the 2024 Summer Olympics – Team event =

Women's Team at the Games of the XXXIII Olympiad
- Venues: Paris Aquatic Centre
- Dates: 5–7 August 2024
- Competitors: 80 from 10 nations
- Winning score: 996.1389

Medalists
1st place, gold medalist(s)		Chang Hao; Feng Yu; Wang Ciyue; Wang Liuyi; Wang Qianyi; Xiang Binxuan; Xiao Yanning; Zhang Yayi	China
2nd place, silver medalist(s)		Anita Alvarez; Jaime Czarkowski; Megumi Field; Keana Hunter; Audrey Kwon; Jacklyn Luu; Daniella Ramirez; Ruby Remati	United States
3rd place, bronze medalist(s)		Txell Ferré; Marina García Polo; Lilou Lluís Valette; Meritxell Mas; Alisa Ozhogina; Paula Ramírez; Iris Tió; Blanca Toledano	Spain

The team event at the 2024 Summer Olympics was held from 5 to 7 August 2024 at the Paris Aquatic Centre.

On 7 October 2022, World Aquatics (then FINA) voted to amend the artistic swimming rules for allow for an eight-member mixed team (previously a women-only team event) with a maximum number of two males in the team. However, no men were selected to compete in Paris 2024.

== Qualification ==
For the team event, the highest-ranked NOC in each of the five continental meets, except for the host nation France (representing Europe), obtained a quota place, while the remaining NOCs competed for the five available spots at the 2024 World Aquatics Championships.

== Competition format ==
The competition consisted of the technical routine, free routine and acrobatic routine. The points accumulated from each of these routines were added together to determine the final ranking.

== Schedule ==
All times are Central European Summer Time (UTC+2)

Schedule
Date	Time	Round
5 August 2024	19:30	Technical routine
6 August 2024	19:30	Free routine
7 August 2024	19:30	Acrobatic routine

== Results ==
Rank	NOC	Technical Routine	Free Routine	Acrobatic Routine	Total points
1st place, gold medalist(s)	China: Chang Hao; Feng Yu; Wang Ciyue; Wang Liuyi / Wang Qianyi; Xiang Binxuan; Xiao Yanning; Zhang Yayi	313.5538	398.8917	283.6934	996.1389
2nd place, silver medalist(s)	United States: Anita Alvarez; Jaime Czarkowski; Megumi Field; Keana Hunter / Audrey Kwon; Jacklyn Luu; Daniella Ramirez; Ruby Remati	282.7567	360.2688	271.3166	914.3421
3rd place, bronze medalist(s)	Spain: Txell Ferré; Marina García Polo; Lilou Lluís Valette; Meritxell Mas / Alisa Ozhogina; Paula Ramírez; Iris Tió; Blanca Toledano	287.1475	346.4644	267.1200	900.7319
4	France: Laelys Alavez; Anastasia Bayandina; Ambre Esnault; Laura Gonzalez / Romane Lunel; Eve Planeix; Charlotte Tremble; Laura Tremble	277.7925	340.0561	268.8001	886.6487
5	Japan: Moe Higa; Moeka Kijima; Uta Kobayashi; Tomoka Sato / Ayano Shimada; Ami Wada; Mashiro Yasunaga; Megumu Yoshida	284.9017	343.0291	252.7533	880.6841
6	Canada: Scarlett Finn; Audrey Lamothe; Jonnie Newman; Raphaelle Plante / Kenzie Priddell; Claire Scheffel; Jacqueline Simoneau; Florence Tremblay	262.4808	343.6854	253.0567	859.2229
7	Mexico: Regina Alférez; Fernanda Arellano; Nuria Diosdado; Itzamary González / Joana Jiménez; Samanta Rodríguez; Jessica Sobrino; Pamela Toscano	242.9491	347.3874	263.4567	853.7932
8	Italy: Linda Cerruti; Marta Iacoacci; Sofia Mastroianni; Enrica Piccoli / Lucrezia Ruggiero; Isotta Sportelli; Giulia Vernice; Francesca Zunino	277.8304	326.1500	241.9866	845.9670
9	Australia: Carolyn Rayna Buckle; Georgia Courage-Gardiner; Raphaelle Gauthier; Kiera Gazzard / Margo Joseph-Kuo; Anastasia Kusmawan; Zoe Poulis; Milena Waldmann	235.9071	280.5521	211.9766	728.4358
10	Egypt: Farida Abdelbary; Mariam Ahmed; Nadine Barsoum; Amina Elfeky / Hanna Hiekal; Salma Marei; Sondos Mohamed; Nehal Saafan	242.7651	243.9896	219.2267	705.9814
