= Artistic swimming at the 2023 Pan American Games – Team =

Team at the 2023 Pan American Games
- Venue: Aquatic Centre
- Dates: October 31, November 2, November 3
- Competitors: 72 from 8 nations
- Winning score: 786.2546

Medalists
Gold medal	Regina Alferez; Nuria Diosdado; Itzamary González; Joana Jiménez; Pamela Toscano; Marla Arellano; Daniela Estrada; Luisa Jalib; Jessica Sobrino	Mexico
Silver medal	Anita Alvarez; Megumi Field; Calista Liu; Bill May; Daniella Ramirez; Jaime Czarkowski; Audrey Kwon; Jacklyn Luu; Ruby Remati	United States
Bronze medal	Sydney Carroll; Audrey Lamothe; Raphaelle Plante; Claire Scheffel; Olena Verbinska; Scarlett Finn; Jonnie Newman; Kenzie Priddell; Florence Tremblay	Canada

The teams competition of the artistic swimming events at the 2023 Pan American Games in Santiago was held on October 31, 2023, November 2, and November 3, at the Aquatic Centre in the National Stadium Park cluster.

All eight teams competed in three rounds of the competition. The first round consisted of a technical, the second round was a free routine, and the third routing was an acrobatic routine. The winner was the team with the highest combined score.

For the first time, men were allowed to compete in artistic swimming at the Pan American Games. Each team could include up to two men out of nine participants in each team. Gustavo Sánchez from Colombia, Nicolás Campos from Chile and Bill May from the United States were the first men to participate in this event.

== Schedule ==
Date	Start	Round
October 31, 2023	21:00	Technical routine
November 1, 2023	21:00	Free routine
November 2, 2023	14:00	Acrobatic routine

== Results ==
The results were as follows:

Rank	Country	Athlete	Technical	Free	Acrobatic	Total
1st place, gold medalist(s)	Mexico	Regina Alferez; Nuria Diosdado; Itzamary González; Joana Jiménez; Pamela Toscano; Marla Arellano; Daniela Estrada; Luisa Jalib; Jessica Sobrino	267.5942	290.2604	228.4000	786.2546
2nd place, silver medalist(s)	United States	Anita Alvarez; Megumi Field; Calista Liu; Bill May; Daniella Ramirez; Jaime Czarkowski; Audrey Kwon; Jacklyn Luu; Ruby Remati	253.8008	295.3667	236.4233	785.5908
3rd place, bronze medalist(s)	Canada	Sydney Carroll; Audrey Lamothe; Raphaelle Plante; Claire Scheffel; Olena Verbinska; Scarlett Finn; Jonnie Newman; Kenzie Priddell; Florence Tremblay	233.2679	230.1042	198.6800	662.0521
4	Brazil	Vitoria Casale; Anna Giulia Franca; Laura Miccuci; Celina Tiemi Rangel; Luiza Lopes; Jullia Catharino; Sara Marinho; Jaddy Milla; Gabriela Regly Silva	214.0904	217.7750	193.1600	625.0254
5	Chile	Nicolás Campos; Trinidad García; Isadora Letelier; Josefa Morales; Rocío Vargas; Soledad García; Theodora Garrido; Antonia Mella; Valentina Valdivia	203.7129	189.3635	187.6833	580.7598
6	Colombia	Mónica Arango; Sara Castañeda; Jennifer Cerquera; Estefanía Roa; Gustavo Sánchez; Kerly Barrera; Isabella Franco; Melisa Ceballos; Sara Rodríguez	204.1163	191.7229	179.1933	575.0325
7	El Salvador	María José Argueta; Brigitte Guadron; Grecia Mendoza; Gabriela Mercado; Daira Sanchez; Cesia Castañeda; Gabriela Magaña; Andrea Mercado; Gabriela Moran	148.7154	158.3417	132.6300	439.6871
8	Cuba	Gabriela Alpajón; Gabriela Batista; Talia Joa; Nathaly Ramos; Dayaris Varona; Andy Avila; Kamila Frías; Alejandra Molina; Soila Valdés	139.7113	121.4729	142.4400	403.6242
