= Artistic swimming at the 2024 Summer Olympics =

Artistic swimming at the Games of the XXXIII Olympiad
- Venue: Paris Aquatic Centre
- Dates: 5–10 August 2024
- No. of events: 2 (1 women, 1 mixed)
- Competitors: 96 from 18 nations

Artistic swimming (formerly called synchronized swimming) competitions at the 2024 Summer Olympics in Paris, France, ran between 5 and 10 August at the Paris Aquatic Centre. For the first time since the 1996 Summer Olympics in Atlanta, the competition featured fewer than 100 athletes, with a total of 96 athletes competing in two medal events, namely the women's duet and the mixed team.

Several significant changes were instituted in the artistic swimming program for Paris 2024 to reinforce the Games-wide effort to achieve gender equality and vast diversity among the nations in the qualifying process. On 7 October 2022, World Aquatics (then FINA) favored nearly 99 percent of the votes to amend the artistic swimming rules between 2022 and 2025, such as the composition of an eight-member mixed team (previously a women's team event) with a maximum number of two males in the team. However, no men were selected to compete.

This was also the first time since 2000 that a team other than Russia won the gold in either discipline, as Russia was banned from the 2024 Olympics due to the Russian invasion of Ukraine.

== Qualification ==
For the team event, the highest-ranked NOC in each of the five continental meets, except for the host nation France (representing Europe), obtained a quota place, while the remaining NOCs competed for the five available spots at the 2024 World Aquatics Championships. For the duet, the highest-ranked NOC from each of the five continental meets that did not have a qualified team received a spot, with the remaining NOCs competing for the three remaining spots through the 2024 Worlds. All ten NOCs eligible to compete in the team event were required to select two members to form a duet.

=== Qualification summary ===
Nation	Team	Duet	Athletes
Australia	Yes	Yes	8
Austria	—N/a	Yes	2
Canada	Yes	Yes	8
China	Yes	Yes	8
Egypt	Yes	Yes	8
France	Yes	Yes	8
Great Britain	—N/a	Yes	2
Greece	—N/a	Yes	2
Italy	Yes	Yes	8
Israel	—N/a	Yes	2
Japan	Yes	Yes	8
South Korea	—N/a	Yes	2
Mexico	Yes	Yes	8
Netherlands	—N/a	Yes	2
New Zealand	—N/a	Yes	2
Spain	Yes	Yes	8
Ukraine	—N/a	Yes	2
United States	Yes	Yes	8
Total: 18 NOCs	80	16	96

== Participating nations ==
- Australia (8)
- Austria (2)
- Canada (8)
- China (8)
- Egypt (8)
- France (8)
- Great Britain (2)
- Greece (2)
- Italy (8)
- Israel (2)
- Japan (8)
- South Korea (2)
- Mexico (8)
- Netherlands (2)
- New Zealand (2)
- Spain (8)
- Ukraine (2)
- United States (8)

== Competition schedule ==
All times use Central European Summer Time (UTC+2)

Day	Date	Start	Finish	Event	Phase
Day 10	Monday 5 August 2024	19:30	21:00	Team	Technical routine
Day 11	Tuesday 6 August 2024	19:30	21:00	Team	Free routine
Day 12	Wednesday 7 August 2024	19:30	21:15	Team	Acrobatic routine
Day 14	Friday 9 August 2024	19:30	21:30	Duet	Technical routine
Day 15	Saturday 10 August 2024	19:30	22:00	Duet	Free routine

Competition on August 6th was opened by Bill May.

== Medal summary ==
=== Medal table ===
* Host nation (France)

Rank	NOC	Gold	Silver	Bronze	Total
1	China	2	0	0	2
2	Great Britain	0	1	0	1
2	United States	0	1	0	1
4	Netherlands	0	0	1	1
4	Spain	0	0	1	1
Totals (5 entries)		2	2	2	6

=== Medalists ===
Event	Gold	Silver	Bronze
Duet	China; Wang Qianyi; Wang Liuyi	Great Britain; Kate Shortman; Isabelle Thorpe	Netherlands; Bregje de Brouwer; Noortje de Brouwer
Team	China; Chang Hao; Feng Yu; Wang Ciyue; Wang Liuyi; Wang Qianyi; Xiang Binxuan; Xiao Yanning; Zhang Yayi	United States; Anita Alvarez; Jaime Czarkowski; Megumi Field; Keana Hunter; Audrey Kwon; Jacklyn Luu; Daniella Ramirez; Ruby Remati	Spain; Txell Ferré; Marina García Polo; Lilou Lluís Valette; Meritxell Mas; Alisa Ozhogina; Paula Ramírez; Iris Tió; Blanca Toledano

== See also ==
- Artistic swimming at the 2022 Asian Games
- Artistic swimming at the 2023 European Games
- Artistic swimming at the 2023 Pan American Games
