= Artistic swimming at the 2023 Pan American Games – Women's duet =

Women's duet at the 2019 Pan American Games
- Venue: Aquatic Centre
- Dates: October 31 and November 1
- Competitors: 24 from 12 nations
- Winning score: 486.0208

Medalists
Gold medal	Nuria Diosdado; Joana Jiménez	Mexico
Silver medal	Megumi Field; Ruby Remati	United States
Bronze medal	Laura Miccuci; Gabriela Regly	Brazil

The women's duet competition of the artistic swimming events at the 2023 Pan American Games in Santiago was held on October 31, 2023, and November 1 at the Aquatic Centre in the National Stadium Park cluster.

All twelve duets competed in both rounds of the competition. The first round consisted of a technical, while the second round was a free routine. The winner was the duet with the highest combined score.

== Schedule ==
Date	Start	Round
October 31, 2023	13:00	Technical routine
November 1, 2023	13:00	Free routine

== Results ==
The results were as follows:

Rank	Country	Athlete	Technical	Free	Total
1st place, gold medalist(s)	Mexico	Nuria Diosdado; Joana Jiménez	250.2333	235.7875	486.0208
2nd place, silver medalist(s)	United States	Megumi Field; Ruby Remati	238.8467	212.8292	451.6758
3rd place, bronze medalist(s)	Brazil	Laura Miccuci; Gabriela Regly	198.2833	191.9604	390.2437
4	Colombia	Melisa Ceballos; Estefanía Roa	212.2917	160.2125	372.5042
5	Canada	Audrey Lamothe; Olena Verbinska	197.6000	163.6458	361.2458
6	Chile	Soledad García; Trinidad García	180.3567	156.3396	336.6963
7	Uruguay	Agustina Medina; Lucía Ververis	158.2250	154.1938	312.4188
8	El Salvador	Cesia Castañeda; Grecia Mendoza	174.0567	122.8563	296.9129
9	Cuba	Gabriela Alpajón; Dayaris Varona	156.2467	134.3708	290.6175
10	Argentina	Tiziana Bonucci; Luisina Caussi	159.0233	92.9854	252.0088
11	Costa Rica	Andrea Maroto; Raquel Zuñiga	131.0217	109.4188	240.4405
—N/a	Aruba	Kyra Hoevertsz; Mikayla Morales	Did not start		
