= Wang Ciyue =

Chinese synchronised swimmer (born 1999)

Personal information
- National team: China
- Born: 14 November 1999 (age 26) Nanjing, Jiangsu, China

Sport
- Sport: Swimming
- Strokes: Synchronised swimming
Medal record
Women's synchronised swimming
Representing China
Olympic Games
| Gold medal – first place | 2024 Paris | Team |
World Championships
| Gold medal – first place | 2022 Budapest | Team technical routine |
| Gold medal – first place | 2022 Budapest | Team free routine |
| Gold medal – first place | 2023 Fukuoka | Team acrobatic routine |
| Gold medal – first place | 2023 Fukuoka | Team free routine |
| Gold medal – first place | 2024 Doha | Team acrobatic routine |
| Gold medal – first place | 2024 Doha | Team technical routine |
| Gold medal – first place | 2024 Doha | Team free routine |
Asian Games
| Gold medal – first place | 2022 Hangzhou | Women's team |
Asian Swimming Championships
| Silver medal – second place | 2016 Tokyo | Solo technical routine |
| Silver medal – second place | 2016 Tokyo | Team technical routine |
| Silver medal – second place | 2016 Tokyo | Team free routine |

Wang Ciyue (Chinese: 王赐月, born 14 November 1999) is a Chinese synchronised swimmer.

== Career ==
In November 2016 at the Asian Swimming Championships in Tokyo, Wang took silver in the solo technical routine as well as being part of the Chinese team that took silver in both the technical and free routine.

In June 2022 at the World Aquatics Championships in Budapest, Wang was part of the Chinese team that won gold in both the technical and free routines. In July 2023 at the World Championships in Fukuoka, she was part of the Chinese team that won gold in both the team free routine and the team acrobatic routine. In October 2023 at the delayed 2022 Asian Games in Hangzhou, Wang was part of China's team that won gold in the team competition.

In February 2024 at the World Championships in Doha, Wang was part of the Chinese team that won gold in the acrobatic, free and technical team routines. At the 2024 Summer Olympics in Paris, she was part of China's team that won gold in the team event.
