= Daniella Ramirez =

American synchronized swimmer (born 2001)

Personal information
- Born: October 6, 2001 (age 25) Indianapolis, Indiana, U.S
- Home town: Miami, Florida, U.S.
- Education: University of California, Los Angeles
- Height: 5 ft 5 in (165 cm)

Sport
- Country: United States
- Sport: Artistic swimming
Medal record
Artistic swimming
Representing United States
Olympic Games
Silver medal – second place	2024 Paris	Team
Pan American Games
Silver medal – second place	2023 Santiago	Team
Bronze medal – third place	2019 Lima	Women's team

Daniella Ramirez (born October 6, 2001) is an American synchronized swimmer. She competed at the 2024 Summer Olympics and won a silver medal in the team event.

== Biography ==
Ramirez was born on October 6, 2001, the youngest of three children. Her parents are from Venezuela. She started competing in synchronized swimming at a young age, as her mother, grandmother, and sister each competed in the sport, and both her father and brother were also swimmers. She grew up in Miami, Florida, where she was a member of the Coral Springs Aquacades club. Ramirez was educated at Florida Virtual School and later the University of California, Los Angeles (UCLA).

Ramirez moved to the San Francisco Bay Area at age 15 to try to make the U.S. national team. She made the national team in 2018. She made her international debut at the 2018 FINA Artistic Swimming World Series, winning three silver and two bronze medals. She won two silver medals at the 2019 Artistic Swimming World Series, one silver medal at the 2020 World Series, and three gold medals at the 2021 World Series, followed by nine golds and a bronze at the 2022 World Series. She was also a part of the U.S. bronze medal-winning team at the 2019 Pan American Games and the silver medal-winning team at the 2023 Pan American Games.

Ramirez won two silver and two bronze medals at the 2023 Artistic Swimming World Cup and one silver and one bronze at the 2023 World Aquatics Championships. She won two bronze medals at the 2024 World Aquatics Championships and four golds and a bronze at the 2024 World Cup. She helped the U.S. qualify for the 2024 Summer Olympics and was selected to compete there, in the team event. The U.S. won a silver medal at the Olympics, their first medal in the event since 2004.
