= Audrey Kwon =

South Korean-American synchronised swimmer (born 2006)

Personal information
- National team: United States
- Born: June 16, 2006 (age 20) Seoul, South Korea
- Home town: Los Angeles, California, U.S.
- Height: 5 ft 3 in (160 cm)

Sport
- Sport: Artistic swimming
- Club: La Mirada Aquabelles
Medal record
Artistic swimming
Representing United States
Olympic Games
Silver medal – second place	2024 Paris	Team
World Championships
Silver medal – second place	2023 Fukuoka	Team acrobatic routine
Bronze medal – third place	2023 Fukuoka	Team technical routine
Bronze medal – third place	2024 Doha	Team acrobatic routine
Bronze medal – third place	2024 Doha	Team free routine
Pan American Games
Silver medal – second place	2023 Santiago	Team

Audrey Kwon (born June 16, 2006) is a South Korean-American synchronised swimmer.

== Early life ==
Kwon moved to the United States when she was two years old. She began artistic swimming when she was eight.

== Career ==
In July 2023 at the World Championships in Fukuoka, Kwon was part of the American team that won silver in the team acrobatic routine and bronze in the team technical routine. In November 2023 at the Pan American Games in Santiago, she was part of the American team that took silver in the team event. In February 2024 at the World Championships in Doha, Kwon was part of the American team that won bronze in the acrobatic team routine and team free routine. Kwon was part of the swim team that won silver during the 2024 Summer Olympics.
