= Jaime Czarkowski =

Canadian-American synchronized swimmer

Personal information
- Nationality: American
- Born: December 5, 2003 (age 22) Calgary, Canada
- Height: 5 ft 6 in (168 cm)

Sport
- Country: United States
- Sport: Artistic swimming
Medal record
Artistic swimming
Representing United States
Olympic Games
Silver medal – second place	2024 Paris	Team
Pan American Games
Silver medal – second place	2023 Santiago	Team

Jaime Czarkowski (born December 5, 2003) is a Canadian-born American synchronized swimmer. She competed at the 2024 Summer Olympics for the United States, winning a silver medal in the team event.

== Biography ==
Czarkowski was born on December 5, 2003, in Calgary, where she grew up. Her father, Mark, was a minor league baseball player with the Seattle Mariners. She holds dual Canadian-American citizenship. Czarkowski first began competing in synchronized swimming at age six, following after a neighbour. She made it her goal to become an Olympian at age eight, after meeting Olympic medallist Cari Read. She is a graduate of Western Canada High School in Calgary.

A member of the Calgary Aquabelles club, Czarkowski initially competed in events for Canada. She made her first Canadian national team at age 13 and became a member of the junior national team aged 14, being selected for the FINA Junior World Championships. During the COVID-19 pandemic, while training from home, she noticed the American national team hired Andrea Fuentes as a coach, someone whom Czarkowski admired.

Czarkowski reached out to Team USA about the possibility of joining them. After a successful tryout, she made the team and moved to Los Angeles in 2021. She competed for the U.S. at the 2022 FINA Artistic Swimming World Series, winning gold medals in six events, and at the 2022 World Aquatics Championships, with a best placement of fifth. She won four medals at the 2023 World Cup, two at the 2023 World Aquatics Championships, two at the 2024 World Aquatics Championships, and six at the 2024 World Cup.

Czarkowski was selected to compete at the 2024 Summer Olympics in the team and duet events. In the team event, she helped the U.S. win the silver medal, the first medal for the country in the event since 2004, while in the duet, she placed 10th with Megumi Field.
