= Jake Foster (swimmer) =

American swimmer

Personal information
- Nationality: American
- Born: September 6, 2000 (age 25) Cincinnati, Ohio, U.S.
- Height: 6 ft 0 in (183 cm)
- Weight: 170 lb (77 kg)
- Relative: Carson Foster (brother)

Sport
- Country: United States
- Sport: Men's swimming
- Strokes: Freestyle
- Club: Mason Manta Rays
- Coach: Eddie Reese

Jake Foster is a retired American swimmer and 2024 World Aquatics Championships team member for the United States. Foster qualified for the 100m and 200m breaststroke and was part of the winning 400m medley relays, both men's and mixed. He placed sixth in the 200m breaststroke at the 2024 US Olympic Team Trials.
