= Keana Hunter =

American artistic Swimmer (born 2004)

Personal information
- National team: United States
- Born: March 4, 2004 (age 22) Seattle, Washington, U.S.
- Height: 5 ft 8 in (173 cm)

Sport
- Sport: Artistic swimming
Medal record
Artistic swimming
Representing United States
Olympic Games
Silver medal – second place	2024 Paris	Team
World Championships
Silver medal – second place	2023 Fukuoka	Team acrobatic routine
Bronze medal – third place	2024 Doha	Team acrobatic routine
Junior Pan American Games
Silver medal – second place	2021 Cali	Team
Silver medal – second place	2021 Cali	Highlight

Keana Hunter (born March 4, 2004) is an American artistic swimmer.

== Career ==
In December 2021 at the Junior Pan American Games held in Cali, Colombia, Hunter was part of the American team that won silver in both the team routine and the highlight routine.

In July 2023 at the World Championships held in Fukuoka, Japan, Hunter was part of the American team that won silver in the team acrobatic routine. In February 2024 at the World Championships in Doha, Qatar, she was part of the American team that won bronze in the acrobatic team routine.
