= Kindred Paul =

Canadian water polo player (born 1996)

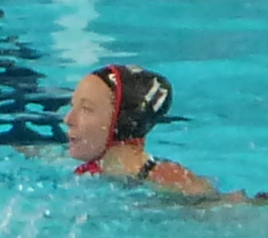
- Paul in 2024

Personal information
- Born: February 22, 1996 (age 30) Spruce Grove, Alberta, Canada
- Height: 1.80 m (5 ft 11 in)
- Weight: 74 kg (163 lb)

Sport
- Country: Canada
- Sport: Water polo
- University team: University of California, Berkeley
Medal record
Women's water polo
Representing Canada
Pan American Games
Silver medal – second place	2019 Lima	Team
Silver medal – second place	2023 Santiago	Team

Kindred Paul (born February 22, 1996) is a Canadian water polo player from Alberta. She is a member of the Canada women's national water polo team. She participated in two Olympic games; the 2020 Summer Olympics and the 2024 Summer Olympics.

She participated at the 2016 FINA Women's Water Polo World League, 2018 FINA Women's Water Polo World League, 2019 FINA Women's Water Polo World League, 2021 FINA Women's Water Polo World League, and 2018 FINA Women's Water Polo World Cup.

During her professional career, she played at UVSE Vizilabda in Budapest, Hungary, Sydney Uni Lions in Sydney, Australia, and CN Terrassa in Barcelona, Spain. She played in the NCAA for University of California, Berkeley.

In June 2021, Paul was named to Canada's 2020 Summer Olympics team.
