= Tara Prentice =

American water polo player (born 1997)

Personal information
- Full name: Tara Mary Elizabeth Prentice
- Nationality: American
- Born: December 20, 1997 (age 28) Temecula, California, U.S.
- Height: 5 ft 11 in (1.80 m)

Sport
- Sport: Water Polo
- Position: Utility Player (WP)
- College team: University of California Irvine
- Coached by: Dan Klatt (UC Irvine); Adam Krikorian (24 Olympics)
Medal record
World Cup
Gold medal – first place	2026 Sydney

Tara Mary Elizabeth Prentice (/ˈprɛntɪs/ PREN-tiss; born December 20, 1997) is an American water polo player who competed for the University of California Irvine and attended the 2024 Paris Olympics where the U.S. team placed fourth overall.

== Early life ==
Prentice was born on December 20, 1997 in Temecula, California, one of four siblings to Samuel and Michelle Prentice, natives of Northern Ireland. She attended Southern California's Murrieta Valley High School in the greater San Diego, Los Angeles area. In 2016 she received California Interscholastic Federation Division II Championship honors, and was an age-group junior Olympic champion for ages 18 and under in 2016 as well.

== University of California Irvine ==
Prentice attended the University of California Irvine, graduating in 2020 with majors in both political science and criminality and law. She played water polo from 2018-2022 at U.C. Irvine under Head Coach Dan Klatt. In her Senior year in 2022, she was an All Big-West and All-American honoree, and scored a notable total of 74 goals. She received academic honors as an Association of Collegiate Water Polo Coaches (ACWPC) All Academic team and Academic All American in 2021-2022. A particularly accomplished student by her Senior year, she received Honor Roll recognition as part of the Big West Commissioners Honor Roll, the highest academic honors bestowed by the Big West conference.

She has completed Masters' Degrees from UC Irvine in Innovation and Entrepreneurship and a second Masters in Demographic and Social Analysis.

In non-Olympic international competition, she earned the gold medal at the 2024 World Championships in Doha, Qatar, and another gold medal at the 2023 Pan American Games in Santiago, Chile. She won a gold medal at the 2023 World Aquatics World Cup in Long Beach, and a gold medal at the 2022 FINA World Championships in Budapest, Hungary.

== 2024 Olympics ==
Tara was part of the American women's water polo team at the 2024 Summer Olympics under Head Coach Adam Krikorian that placed fourth overall. The women's team from Spain took the gold, with Australia taking the silver, and the Netherlands winning the bronze.
