= Aquatics Canada Aquatiques =

Aquatics organization

Aquatic Federation of Canada
- Fédération aquatique du Canada
- Abbreviation: AFC
- Formation: 1968
- Purpose: Federation of the Olympic, Aquatics federations of Canada
- Official language: English, French
- Subsidiaries: Diving Canada, Canada Artistic Swimming, Swimming Canada, Water Polo Canada
- Affiliations: FINA, ASUA

The Aquatic Federation of Canada (AFC) (in French: Fédération aquatique du Canada, FAC) is a federation of the Olympic, Aquatics federations of Canada: Diving Canada, Canada Artistic Swimming, Swimming Canada, and Water Polo Canada. AFC is Canada's member federation to FINA, the International Federation which oversees Aquatics, as well as ASUA, the Aquatics continental organization for the Americas.
