= Jovana Sekulic =

Serbian-American water polo player

Personal information
- Born: November 7, 2002 (age 23) Belgrade, Serbia
- Education: Princeton University

Sport
- Country: United States
- Sport: Water polo
- College team: Princeton Tigers

Jovana Sekulic (/joʊˈvɑːnə ˈsɛkuːliːtʃ/ yoh-VAH-nə SEK-oo-leetch; born November 7, 2002) is a Serbian-American water polo player. She was selected as part of the United States team at the 2024 Summer Olympics.

== Biography ==
Sekulic was born on November 7, 2002, in Belgrade, Serbia. Her family moved to the United States in c. 2014, settling in Media, Pennsylvania. She played water polo in Serbia, a country in which that sport was very popular, and struggled to find a club when she moved to the U.S., later joining that country's Maverick Water Polo club. Early on in the U.S., she often played against boys due to her advanced skill level, and still was successful. She attended Episcopal Academy in Newtown Square, Pennsylvania, where she competed in water polo, track and swimming, and was a member of its Vocal Ensemble. In water polo, she was selected twice to the All-Eastern first-team, was a two-time Eastern most valuable player and led her team to three Eastern championships.

Sekulic was a member of the U.S. women's youth national water polo team in high school. She graduated from Episcopal in 2022 and enrolled at Princeton University, where she continued her career. In the 2022 season at Princeton, she played 27 games and scored 74 goals, being named the Collegiate Water Polo Association Rookie of the Year, third-team All-American, first-team All-Conference and first-team CWPA All-Tournament. The following season, she played 28 games and recorded a team-leading 76 goals, being named second-team All-American, first-team CWPA All-Tournament, first-team NCAA first-team All-Tournament, first-team All-Conference and the CWPA Player of the Year.

Sekulic was selected for the U.S. national team which competed at the 2023 World Aquatics Championships. She scored two goals at the World Aquatics Championships and also competed at the 2023 World Aquatics World Cup, scoring twice. She redshirted at Princeton in 2024 to focus on international competitions. She scored four goals for the U.S. at the 2024 World Aquatics Championships and later was chosen for the U.S. squad at the 2024 Summer Olympics.
