= Emma Finlin =

Canadian swimmer (born 2005)

Personal information
- Born: April 27, 2005 (age 21) Edmonton, Alberta, Canada
- Height: 165 cm (5 ft 5 in)

Sport
- Country: Canada
- Sport: Swimming
- Strokes: Freestyle; Open water

Emma Finlin (born April 27, 2005) is a Canadian competitive swimmer, primarily competing in the long distance freestyle and open water events.

== Career ==
In April 2023, Finlin was named to Canada's 2023 Pan American Games team. At the 2024 World Aquatics Championships, Finlin finished one place outside qualifying for the 2024 Summer Olympics. However, Finlin received an unused quota spot as the best ranked athlete not already qualified.

At the conclusion of the 2024 Canadian Swim trials, Finlin was officially named to Canada's 2024 Olympics team.
