= David Paradelo =

Canadian water polo player and coach

Personal information
- Born: October 7, 1985 (age 40)

Sport
- Sport: Water polo

David Paradelo (born 7 October 1985) is a Canadian water polo coach. He was the head coach of the Canada women's national water polo team at the 2020 Summer Olympics.
