= Ruby Remati =

American synchronized swimmer (born 2002)

Personal information
- Nationality: American
- Born: August 14, 2002 (age 24) Sydney, Australia
- Education: Ohio State University
- Height: 5 ft 7 in (170 cm)

Sport
- Country: United States
- Sport: Artistic swimming
- College team: Ohio State Buckeyes
Medal record
Artistic swimming
Representing United States
Olympic Games
Silver medal – second place	2024 Paris	Team
Pan American Games
Silver medal – second place	2023 Santiago	Women's duet
Silver medal – second place	2023 Santiago	Women's team

Ruby Remati (born August 14, 2002) is an American synchronized swimmer. She represented the United States at the 2024 Summer Olympics and won a silver medal.

== Biography ==
=== Early life ===
Remati was born in Sydney, Australia, but grew up in Andover, Massachusetts, United States. She started swimming at a young age and discovered synchronized swimming at age five. She recalled that at the local YMCA, "I saw a competition going on in the main pool and I saw all these sparkly suits and someone flying in the air. I turned to my dad, and I said, 'I want to do that. I want to wear a sparkly suit.' He's like, 'You want to swim.' I'm like, 'No, I just want the sparkly suit.' Eventually, I got to wanting to do the swimming part."

=== Youth career (2013 – 2022) ===
Remati joined the ANA Synchro swimming club in Andover later that year. She was coached by Pan American Games medalist Leah Pinette and by age 11, she made the U.S. national team for her age group. In 2014, she was a member of the team that won gold in the 12 & Under bracket at the UANA Pan American Synchronized Swimming Championships. She moved to California when she was age 14 to train full-time in the sport. She won the U.S. national championship in both solo and figures artistic swimming in 2016 and 2017. Paired with Anita Alvarez, she won two bronze medals at the 2018 China Open.

Remati competed at the 2019 Pan American Games and won two bronze medals. She won bronze at the 2020 French Open event. She was a member of the U.S. team that narrowly missed qualification for the 2020 Summer Olympics, missing out by a fraction of a point. The U.S. qualified in the duet, with Remati being a substitute in the qualifying tournament, although she did not compete at the Olympics. In 2021, she competed at the FINA Artistic Swimming World Series, placing fourth in two team events and fifth in the duet.

=== Adult career (2022 – present) ===
Remati enrolled at Ohio State University in 2022, competing for the synchronized swimming team and winning consecutive national championships while being an All-American. In 2023, she competed in the duet and team events at the 2023 Pan American Games and won two silver medals. She helped the U.S. team qualify for the 2024 Summer Olympics and was selected to compete there.
