= Jacklyn Luu =

American synchronized swimmer (born 1999)

Personal information
- Born: April 30, 1999 (age 27) Milpitas, California, U.S.
- Education: Stanford University
- Height: 5 ft 5 in (165 cm)

Sport
- Country: United States
- Sport: Artistic swimming
- College team: Stanford Cardinal
Medal record
Artistic swimming
Representing United States
Olympic Games
Silver medal – second place	2024 Paris	Team
Pan American Games
Silver medal – second place	2023 Santiago	Team

Jacklyn Luu (born April 30, 1999) is an American synchronized swimmer. She competed at the 2024 Summer Olympics and won a silver medal in the team event.

== Biography ==
Luu was born on April 30, 1999. One of three children, she grew up in Milpitas, California. She is a second-generation Vietnamese-American, with her mother having been a Vietnamese refugee. She started competing in synchronized swimming in 2011 and was initially a member of the Milpitas Tidal Waves before training with the Santa Clara Swim Club's Santa Clara Aquamaids.

Luu quickly saw success in competitions, placing first in the team event and second in the duet event at the 2011 UANA Pan American Championships. She placed first again at the 2012 UANA Championships in the team event and placed second in the team and third in the duet event at the 2013 Age Group Championships. She placed first in four events at the 2014 UANA Championships and in three events at the 2015 Junior National Championships, including the solo competition. In 2016, she won first place in three events at the national championships and second place in the solo event. She competed as part of the U.S. team at the world championships in 2017, helping them place 11th.

Luu attended Valley Christian High School, where she graduated from in 2017. Afterwards, she enrolled at Stanford University where she continued her swimming career, competing for the Stanford Cardinal from 2018 to 2022. At Stanford, she was a five-time All-American selection, a three-time individual national champion, and was a two-time national athlete of the year as chosen by USA Artistic Swimming. She won two medals at the 2018 national championships, five medals at the 2019 national championships, four medals at the 2021 national championships, and three medals at the 2022 national championships. She graduated from Stanford following the 2022 season.

Luu competed for the U.S. at the 2023 World Aquatics Swimming World Cup, winning three medals, and at the 2023 World Aquatics Championships, winning a bronze medal. She won a bronze at the 2024 World Aquatics Championships and three medals at the 2024 World Cup. She was selected to compete as part of the U.S. team at the 2024 Summer Olympics and helped them win the silver medal, the country's first medal in the event since 2004.
