= Hayley McKelvey =

Canadian water polo player (born 1996)

Personal information
- Nationality: Canadian
- Born: 11 March 1996 (age 30) Delta, British Columbia, Canada
- Height: 180 cm (5 ft 11 in)

Sport
- Sport: Water polo
- Team: Canada women's national water polo team; Plebiscito Padova
Medal record
Women's water polo
Representing Canada
Pan American Games
Silver medal – second place	2019 Lima	Team

Hayley McKelvey (born 11 March 1996) is a Canadian water polo player who is a member of the Canada women's national water polo team. She was part of the team at the 2017 World Aquatics Championships and 2019 Pan American Games. She was part of the team in the women's water polo tournament at the 2020 Summer Olympics.

She played for University of Southern California's women's water polo team and currently plays for Plebiscito Padova in the Italian Serie A1: she had previously played for Fiorentina and Orizzonte Catania in the same league.
