= Megumi Field =

American synchronized swimmer (born 2005)

Personal information
- Born: October 15, 2005 (age 21) Wilmington, Delaware, U.S.
- Height: 5 ft 6 in (168 cm)

Sport
- Sport: Artistic swimming
Medal record
Artistic swimming
Representing United States
Olympic Games
Silver medal – second place	2024 Paris	Team
Pan American Games
Silver medal – second place	2023 Santiago	Women's duet
Silver medal – second place	2023 Santiago	Team

Megumi Field (born October 15, 2005) is an American synchronized swimmer who competed in the 2024 Olympic Games, winning silver in the team event and placing 10th in the duet.

Field began synchronized swimming when she was five years old. In 2010, Field and her mother Naomi moved from Wilmington, Delaware to Cerritos, California, so she could train at University of California, Los Angeles.

Field won three silver medals at the Junior Pan American Games in 2021. In 2024, she qualified for the 2024 Paris Olympics in artistic swimming women's duet and team events.

She is committed to Stanford University.
