= Florence Tremblay =

Canadian artistic swimmer

Personal information
- Born: July 13, 2004 (age 21) Rimouski, Quebec, Canada

Sport
- Sport: Artistic swimming
Medal record
Women's artistic swimming
Representing Canada
Pan American Games
Bronze medal – third place	2023 Santiago	Team

Florence Tremblay (born July 13, 2004) is a Canadian artistic swimmer.

== Career ==
Tremblay has represented Canada at two World Aquatics Championships. In September 2023, Tremblay was named to Canada's 2023 Pan American Games team. At the games, Tremblay was part of the bronze medal-winning team.

In June 2024, Tremblay was named to Canada's 2024 Olympic team.
