= Jonnie Newman =

Canadian artistic swimmer

Personal information
- Born: March 7, 2006 (age 20) Grande Prairie, Alberta, Canada

Sport
- Sport: Artistic swimming
Medal record
Women's artistic swimming
Representing Canada
Pan American Games
Bronze medal – third place	2023 Santiago	Team

Jonnie Newman (born March 7, 2006) is a Canadian artistic swimmer and kayaker.

== Career ==
Newman has represented Canada at two World Aquatics Championships. In September 2023, Newman was named to Canada's 2023 Pan American Games team. At the games, Newman was part of the bronze medal-winning team.

In June 2024, Newman was named to Canada's 2024 Olympic team.

Following the Olympics, Newman switched to focus on the sport of canoe-kayak, and will represent Alberta at the 2025 Canada Summer Games in that discipline.
