= Kenzie Priddell =

Canadian artistic swimmer

Personal information
- Born: July 8, 1997 (age 29) Regina, Saskatchewan, Canada

Sport
- Sport: Artistic swimming
Medal record
Women's artistic swimming
Representing Canada
Pan American Games
Bronze medal – third place	2023 Santiago	Team

Kenzie Priddell (born July 8, 1997) is a Canadian artistic swimmer.

== Career ==
Priddell has represented Canada at four World Aquatics Championships. In September 2023, Priddell was named to Canada's 2023 Pan American Games team. At the games, Priddell was part of the bronze medal-winning team.

In June 2024, Priddell was named to Canada's 2024 Olympic team. This will mark Priddell's first Olympic appearance as she was the alternate for Canada at the 2020 Summer Olympics.
