= Raphaelle Plante =

Canadian artistic swimmer

Personal information
- Nationality: Canadian
- Born: August 19, 2002 (age 23) Vienna, Austria

Sport
- Sport: Artistic swimming
Medal record
Women's artistic swimming
Representing Canada
Pan American Games
Bronze medal – third place	2023 Santiago	Team

Raphaelle Plante (born August 19, 2002) is a Canadian artistic swimmer.

== Career ==
Plante started swimming at the age of seven. Plante was born in Austria and lived in Las Vegas for most of her life, as her father worked for Cirque du Soleil. Plante has represented Canada at three World Aquatics Championships. In September 2023, Plante was named to Canada's 2023 Pan American Games team. At the games, Plante was part of the bronze medal-winning team.

In June 2024, Plante was named to Canada's 2024 Olympic team.
