= Claire Scheffel =

Canadian artistic swimmer

Personal information
- Born: September 19, 2003 (age 22) Brantford, Ontario, Canada
- Height: 185 cm (6 ft 1 in)

Sport
- Sport: Artistic swimming
- Club: Brant artistic swimming club

Achievements and titles
- Olympic finals: Paris 2024
Medal record
Women's artistic swimming
Representing Canada
Pan American Games
Bronze medal – third place	2023 Santiago	Team

Claire Scheffel (born September 19, 2003) is a Canadian artistic swimmer.

== Career ==
Scheffel has represented Canada at two World Aquatics Championships. In September 2023, Scheffel was named to Canada's 2023 Pan American Games team. At the games, Scheffel was part of the bronze medal-winning team.

In June 2024, Scheffel was named to Canada's 2024 Olympic team.
