= Scarlett Finn =

Canadian artistic swimmer

Personal information
- Born: February 25, 2002 (age 24) Toronto, Ontario, Canada

Sport
- Sport: Artistic swimming
Medal record
Women's artistic swimming
Representing Canada
Pan American Games
Bronze medal – third place	2023 Santiago	Team

Scarlett Finn (born February 25, 2002) is a Canadian artistic swimmer.

== Career ==
Finn has represented Canada at three World Aquatics Championships. In September 2023, Finn was named to Canada's 2023 Pan American Games team. At the games, Finn was part of the bronze medal-winning team.

In June 2024, Finn was named to Canada's 2024 Olympic team.
