= Artistic swimming at the Pan American Games =

- No. of events: 2 (women)

Artistic swimming (previously known as synchronized swimming) has been a part of the Pan American Games since the Games' second edition in 1955. In 2017, the sport was renamed to artistic swimming, and future games had that as the sport's title.

== Events ==
Event	Edition																		Year
Event	Mexico	USA	Brazil	Canada	Colombia	Mexico	Puerto Rico	Venezuela	USA	Cuba	Argentina	Canada	Dominican Republic	Brazil	Mexico	Canada	Peru	Chile	Year
Event	1955	1959	1963	1967	1971	1975	1979	1983	1987	1991	1995	1999	2003	2007	2011	2015	2019	2023	Year
Solo	•	—N/a	•	—N/a	•	•	•	•	•	•	•								9
Duet	•	—N/a	•	—N/a	•	•	•	•	•	•	•	•	•	•	•	•	•	•	16
Team	•	—N/a	•	—N/a	•	•	•	•	•	•	•	•	•	•	•	•	•	•	16

== Medal table ==
Updated to include the 2023 edition.

Rank	Nation	Gold	Silver	Bronze	Total
1	United States	28	11	5	44
2	Canada	11	21	5	37
3	Mexico	2	8	15	25
4	Venezuela	0	1	2	3
5	Brazil	0	0	9	9
6	Cuba	0	0	5	5
Totals (6 entries)		41	41	41	123
