= Bolivia at the 2025 World Aquatics Championships =

- Flag of Bolivia
- World Aquatics code: BOL
- National federation: Swimming Federation of Bolivia
- Website: febona.org

in Singapore
- Competitors: 9 in 2 sports
- Medals: Gold 0 Silver 0 Bronze 0 Total 0

World Aquatics Championships appearances
- 1973; 1975; 1978; 1982; 1986; 1991; 1994; 1998; 2001; 2003; 2005; 2007; 2009; 2011; 2013; 2015; 2017; 2019; 2022; 2023; 2024; 2025

Bolivia is competing at the 2025 World Aquatics Championships in Singapore from 11 July to 3 August 2025.

== Competitors ==
The following is the list of competitors in the Championships.

Sport	Men	Women	Total
Open water swimming	4	1	5
Swimming	2	2	4
Total	6	3	9

== Open water swimming ==
Men

Athlete	Event	Final	
Athlete	Event	Time	Rank
Percy Escobar	5 km	1:11:26.20	71
Diego Solano	5 km	DNF	
Santiago Castedo	10 km	OTL	
Alejandro Plaza	10 km	DNF	

Women

Athlete	Event	Final	
Athlete	Event	Time	Rank
Loreley Daleney	5 km	DNF	

== Swimming ==
Men

Athlete	Event	Heat		Semifinal		Final	
Athlete	Event	Time	Rank	Time	Rank	Time	Rank
Jesus Cabrera	50 m breaststroke	30.35	67	Did not advance			
Esteban Nuñez del Prado	100 m breaststroke	DSQ		Did not advance			
Esteban Nuñez del Prado	100 m butterfly	54.82	51	Did not advance			

Women

Athlete	Event	Heat		Semifinal		Final	
Athlete	Event	Time	Rank	Time	Rank	Time	Rank
Estela Duran	100 m freestyle	1:00.78	58	Did not advance			
Adriana Giles	50 m freestyle	26.88	50	Did not advance			
Adriana Giles	50 m butterfly	28.23	48	Did not advance			
