= Dominican Republic at the 2025 World Aquatics Championships =

- Flag of the Dominican Republic
- World Aquatics code: DOM

in Singapore
- Competitors: 11 in 3 sports
- Medals: Gold 0 Silver 0 Bronze 0 Total 0

World Aquatics Championships appearances
- 1973; 1975; 1978; 1982; 1986; 1991; 1994; 1998; 2001; 2003; 2005; 2007; 2009; 2011; 2013; 2015; 2017; 2019; 2022; 2023; 2024; 2025

Dominican Republic competed at the 2025 World Aquatics Championships in Singapore from July 11 to August 3, 2025.

== Athletes by discipline ==
Sport	Men	Women	Total
Diving	3	1	4
Open water swimming	1	2	3
Swimming	2	2	4
Total	6	5	11

== Diving ==
Men

Athlete	Event	Preliminaries		Semi-finals		Final	
Athlete	Event	Points	Rank	Points	Rank	Points	Rank
Frandiel Gómez	1 m springboard	270.90	45	—N/a		Did not advance	
Jonathan Ruvalcaba	1 m springboard	358.30	9 Q	—N/a		354.50	10
Frandiel Gómez	3 m springboard	298.70	56	Did not advance			
Jonathan Ruvalcaba	3 m springboard	374.05	18 Q	400.40	10 Q	404.50	12
Frandiel Gómez; Jonathan Ruvalcaba	3 m synchronized springboard	334.32	17	—N/a		Did not advance	
Saymol Sánchez	10 m platform	155.50	48	Did not advance			

Women

Athlete	Event	Preliminaries		Semi-finals		Final	
Athlete	Event	Points	Rank	Points	Rank	Points	Rank
Victoria Garza	10 m platform	246.80	23	Did not advance			

Mixed

Athlete	Event	Final	
Athlete	Event	Points	Rank
Victoria Garza; Saymol Sánchez	3 m synchronized springboard	146.76	19

== Open water swimming ==
Men

Athlete	Event	Heats		Semifinal		Final	
Athlete	Event	Time	Rank	Time	Rank	Time	Rank
Juan Diego Núñez	Men's 3 km knockout sprints	19:38.5	28	Did not advance			
Juan Diego Núñez	Men's 5 km	—N/a				1:09:07.7	70
Juan Diego Núñez	Men's 10 km	—N/a				2:21:58.4	58

Women

Athlete	Event	Heats		Semifinal		Final	
Athlete	Event	Time	Rank	Time	Rank	Time	Rank
Isabella Hernández	Women's 3 km knockout sprints	20:33.3	27	Did not advance			
Christina Durán	Women's 5 km	—N/a				1:15:31.4	63
Isabella Hernández	Women's 5 km	—N/a				1:12:35.6	56
Christina Durán	Women's 10 km	—N/a				DNF	
Isabella Hernández	Women's 10 km	—N/a				DNF	

== Swimming ==
Men

Athlete	Event	Heat		Semi-final		Final	
Athlete	Event	Time	Rank	Time	Rank	Time	Rank
Javier Núñez	50 m freestyle	22.82	51	Did not advance			
Javier Núñez	100 m freestyle	50.87	53	Did not advance			
Josué Domínguez	50 m breaststroke	28.07	43	Did not advance			
Josué Domínguez	100 m breaststroke	1:03.76	52	Did not advance			

Women

Athlete	Event	Heat		Semi-final		Final	
Athlete	Event	Time	Rank	Time	Rank	Time	Rank
María Alejandra Fernández	50 m freestyle	27.77	61	Did not advance			
María Alejandra Fernández	100 m freestyle	1:00.06	53	Did not advance			
Elizabeth Jiménez	100 m backstroke	1:04.32	39	Did not advance			
Elizabeth Jiménez	200 m backstroke	2:19.03	36	Did not advance			

Mixed

Athlete	Event	Heat		Final	
Athlete	Event	Time	Rank	Time	Rank
Javier Núñez; Josué Domínguez; María Alejandra Fernández; Elizabeth Jiménez	4 × 100 m freestyle relay	3:46.82	25	Did not advance	
Javier Núñez; Josué Domínguez; María Alejandra Fernández; Elizabeth Jiménez	4 × 100 m medley relay	4:03.12	21	Did not advance	
