= Swimming at the 2015 World Aquatics Championships – Mixed 4 × 100 metre medley relay =

4 × 100 metre mixed medley relay at the 2015 World Aquatics Championships
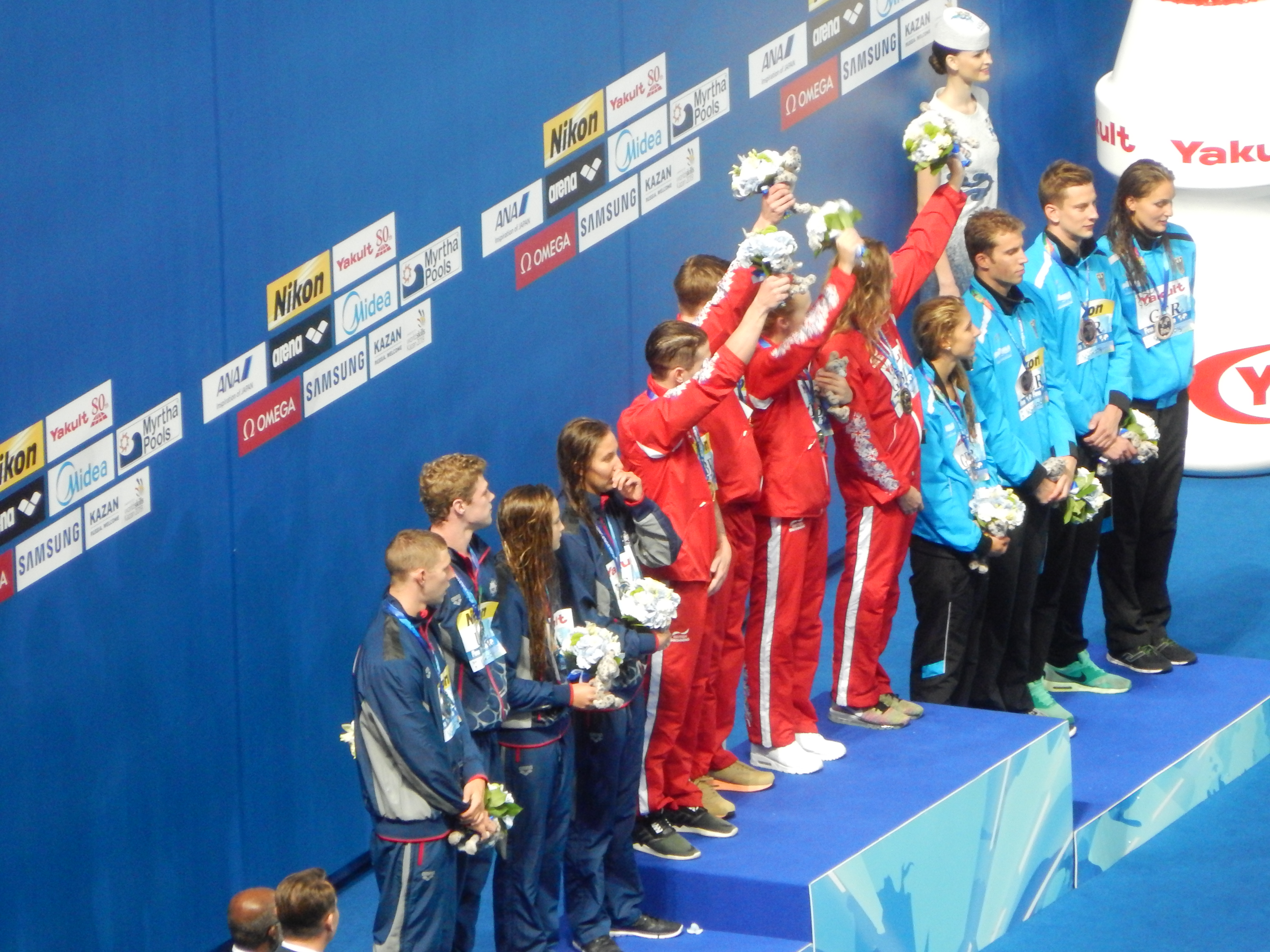
- Victory Ceremony
- Dates: 5 August (heats and final)
- Competitors: 125 from 28 nations
- Winning time: 3:41.71 WR

Medalists
gold medal	Chris Walker-Hebborn; Adam Peaty; Siobhan-Marie O'Connor; Fran Halsall; Ross Murdoch; Rachael Kelly	Great Britain
silver medal	Ryan Murphy; Kevin Cordes; Katie McLaughlin; Margo Geer; Kendyl Stewart; Lia Neal	United States
bronze medal	Jan-Philip Glania; Hendrik Feldwehr; Alexandra Wenk; Annika Bruhn	Germany

The 4 × 100 metre mixed medley relay competition of the swimming events at the 2015 World Aquatics Championships was held on 5 August with the heats and the final.

== Records ==
Prior to the competition, the existing world and championship records were as follows.

World record	United Kingdom	3:44.02	Berlin, Germany	19 August 2014
Competition record				

The following new records were set during this competition

Date	Event	Nation	Time	Record
5 August	Heats	Russia	3:45.87	CR
5 August	Heats	United States	3:42.33	WR
5 August	Final	Great Britain	3:41.71	WR

== Results ==
=== Heats ===
The heats were held at 10:49.

Rank	Heat	Lane	Nation	Swimmers	Time	Notes
1	3	2	United States	Ryan Murphy (52.18); Kevin Cordes (58.33); Kendyl Stewart (57.78); Lia Neal (54.04)	3:42.33	Q, WR
2	3	0	Great Britain	Chris Walker-Hebborn (53.40); Ross Murdoch (59.14); Rachael Kelly (58.02); Fran Halsall (53.83)	3:44.39	Q
3	4	3	Germany	Jan-Philip Glania (53.89); Hendrik Feldwehr (59.22); Alexandra Wenk (57.88); Annika Bruhn (54.40)	3:45.39	Q, NR
4	2	4	Russia	Daria Ustinova (59.89); Kirill Prigoda (59.99); Daniil Pakhomov (51.52); Veronika Popova (54.47)	3:45.87	Q
5	3	7	Italy	Simone Sabbioni (53.46); Arianna Castiglioni (1:07.13); Matteo Rivolta (51.29); Erika Ferraioli (54.15)	3:46.03	Q, NR
6	1	6	China	Xu Jiayu (53.44); Li Xiang (1:01.38); Chen Xinyi (58.51); Zhu Menghui (54.15)	3:47.48	Q, AS
7	3	1	Hungary	Gábor Balog (54.03); David Horvath (1:01.66); Evelyn Verrasztó (59.19); Zsuzsanna Jakabos (54.62)	3:49.50	Q
8	4	9	Canada	Russell Wood (54.76); Rachel Nicol (1:07.60); Noemie Thomas (57.96); Karl Krug (49.28)	3:49.60	Q
9	4	4	Brazil	Daynara de Paula (1:02.58); Felipe Lima (1:00.86); Daiene Dias (1:00.17); João de Lucca (49.84)	3:53.45	
10	3	5	Switzerland	Nils Liess (56.01); Martin Schweizer (1:01.81); Danielle Villars (59.47); Megan Connor (56.27)	3:53.56	
11	1	4	Finland	Mimosa Jallow (1:01.48); Sami Aaltomaa (1:01.64); Emilia Pikkarainen (59.79); Ari-Pekka Liukkonen (52.46)	3:55.37	
12	4	7	Colombia	Omar Pinzón (57.42); Jorge Murillo (1:01.57); Jessica Camposano (1:00.84); Isabella Arcila (55.59)	3:55.42	
13	4	6	Singapore	Quah Zheng Wen (54.63); Ho Ru'En Roanne (1:11.98); Quah Ting Wen (59.80); Yeo Kai Quan (51.10)	3:57.51	
14	2	8	Mexico	Lourdes Villaseñor (1:04.70); Daniela Carrillo (1:10.01); Daniel Ramirez Carranza (55.15); Alejandro Escudero (50.95)	4:00.81	
15	1	3	Thailand	Kasipat Chograthin (59.13); Radomyos Matjiur (1:04.03); Sutasinee Pankaew (1:03.60); Jenjira Srisa-Ard (1:00.43)	4:07.19	
16	2	3	Azerbaijan	Boris Kirillov (58.16); Anton Zheltyakov (1:02.95); Alsu Bayramova (1:06.50); Fatima Alkaramova (1:00.32)	4:07.93	NR
17	2	0	Costa Rica	Mario Montoya (1:01.81); Esteban Araya (1:07.64); Marie Laura Meza (1:01.11); Helena Moreno (1:00.19)	4:10.75	
18	2	9	Bolivia	Andrew Rutherfurd (59.14); José Quintanilla (1:08.95); Karen Torrez (1:02.83); María José Ribera (1:01.57)	4:12.49	
19	2	2	Papua New Guinea	Ryan Pini (56.38); Tegan McCarthy (1:17.87); Sam Seghers (56.07); Barbara Vali-Skelton (1:03.58)	4:13.90	NR
20	3	6	Zambia	Jade Howard (1:08.07); Alex Axiotis (1:07.06); Ralph Goveia (56.41); Tilka Paljk (1:02.86)	4:14.40	
21	4	0	Macau	Ngou Pok Man (59.43); Lei On Kei (1:14.85); Chao Man Hou (1:00.80); Long Chi Wai (1:00.94)	4.16.02	
22	2	5	Sri Lanka	Kimiko Raheem (1:05.47); Machiko Raheem (1:24.19); Matthew Abeysinghe (56.34); Cherantha de Silva (53.24)	4:19.24	
23	3	8	Jordan	Mohammed Bedour (1:04.16); Lydia Musleh (1:18.81); Khader Baqlah (57.68); Talita Baqlah (59.06)	4:19.71	
24	3	9	Dominican Republic	Arianna Sanna (1:10.71); Jean Luis Gómez (1:10.40); Dorian McMenemy (1:06.93); Jhonny Pérez (51.75)	4:19.79	
25	4	1	Kenya	Talisa Lanoe (1:09.32); Issa Mohamed (1:13.15); Emily Muteti (1:05.72); Hamdan Bayusuf (55.80)	4:23.99	
26	4	5	Mongolia	Enkhkhuslen Batbayar (1:13.20); Delgerkhuu Myagmar (1:14.17); Batsaikhan Dulguun (59.05); Yesui Bayar (1:08.04)	4:34.46	
	2	7	Turkey	Ekaterina Avramova (1:02.97); Viktoriya Zeynep Gunes (DSQ); Kaan Türker Ayar; Kemal Arda Gürdal	DSQ	
	3	4	France	Benjamin Stasiulis (54.43); Giacomo Perez-Dortona (59.55); Marie Wattel (58.62); Anna Santamans (DSQ)	DSQ	
	1	2	Albania		DNS	
	1	5	Philippines		DNS	
	2	1	Suriname		DNS	
	2	6	Egypt		DNS	
	3	3	Japan		DNS	
	4	2	Argentina		DNS	
	4	8	Mozambique		DNS	

=== Final ===
The final was held at 19:19.

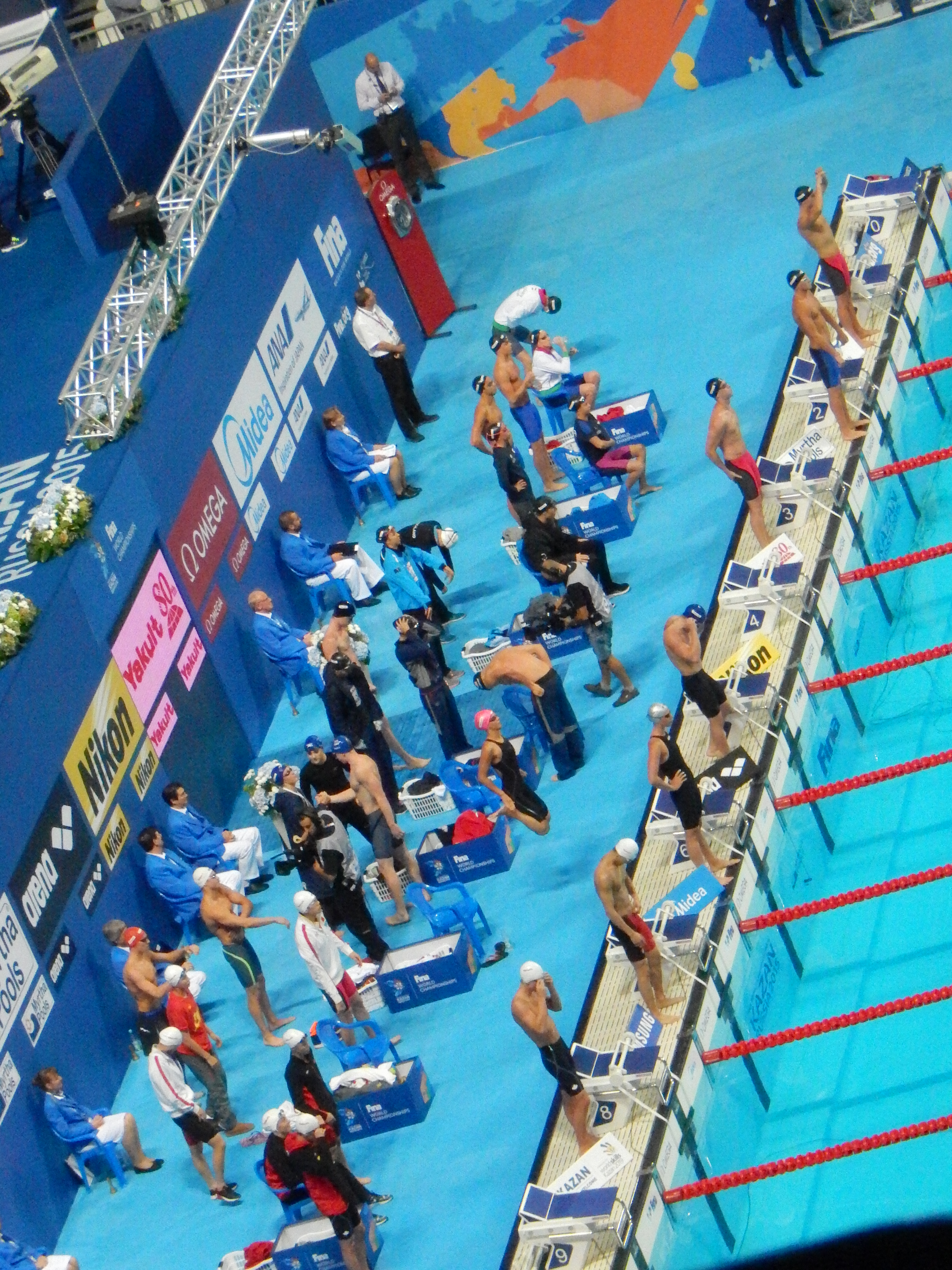
Start of the final

Rank	Lane	Nation	Swimmers	Time	Notes
1st place, gold medalist(s)	5	Great Britain	Chris Walker-Hebborn (52.94); Adam Peaty (57.98); Siobhan-Marie O'Connor (57.02); Fran Halsall (53.77)	3:41.71	WR
2nd place, silver medalist(s)	4	United States	Ryan Murphy (53.31); Kevin Cordes (58.63); Katie McLaughlin (57.56); Margo Geer (53.77)	3:43.27	
3rd place, bronze medalist(s)	3	Germany	Jan-Philip Glania (53.52); Hendrik Feldwehr (59.16); Alexandra Wenk (57.21); Annika Bruhn (54.24)	3:44.13	NR
4	7	China	Xu Jiayu (52.74); Li Xiang (1:00.47); Lu Ying (57.39); Zhu Menghui (54.05)	3:44.65	AS
5	6	Russia	Anastasia Fesikova (1:00.48); Yuliya Yefimova (1:05.46); Daniil Pakhomov (51.60); Vladimir Morozov (47.29)	3:44.83	
6	2	Italy	Simone Sabbioni (53.68); Arianna Castiglioni (1:06.44); Piero Codia (51.59); Silvia Di Pietro (53.88)	3:45.59	NR
7	8	Canada	Russell Wood (54.51); Richard Funk (59.69); Katerine Savard (57.83); Sandrine Mainville (54.20)	3:46.23	
8	1	Hungary	Gábor Balog (54.32); Dávid Horváth (1:01.80); Evelyn Verrasztó (59.46); Zsuzsanna Jakabos (54.48)	3:50.06	

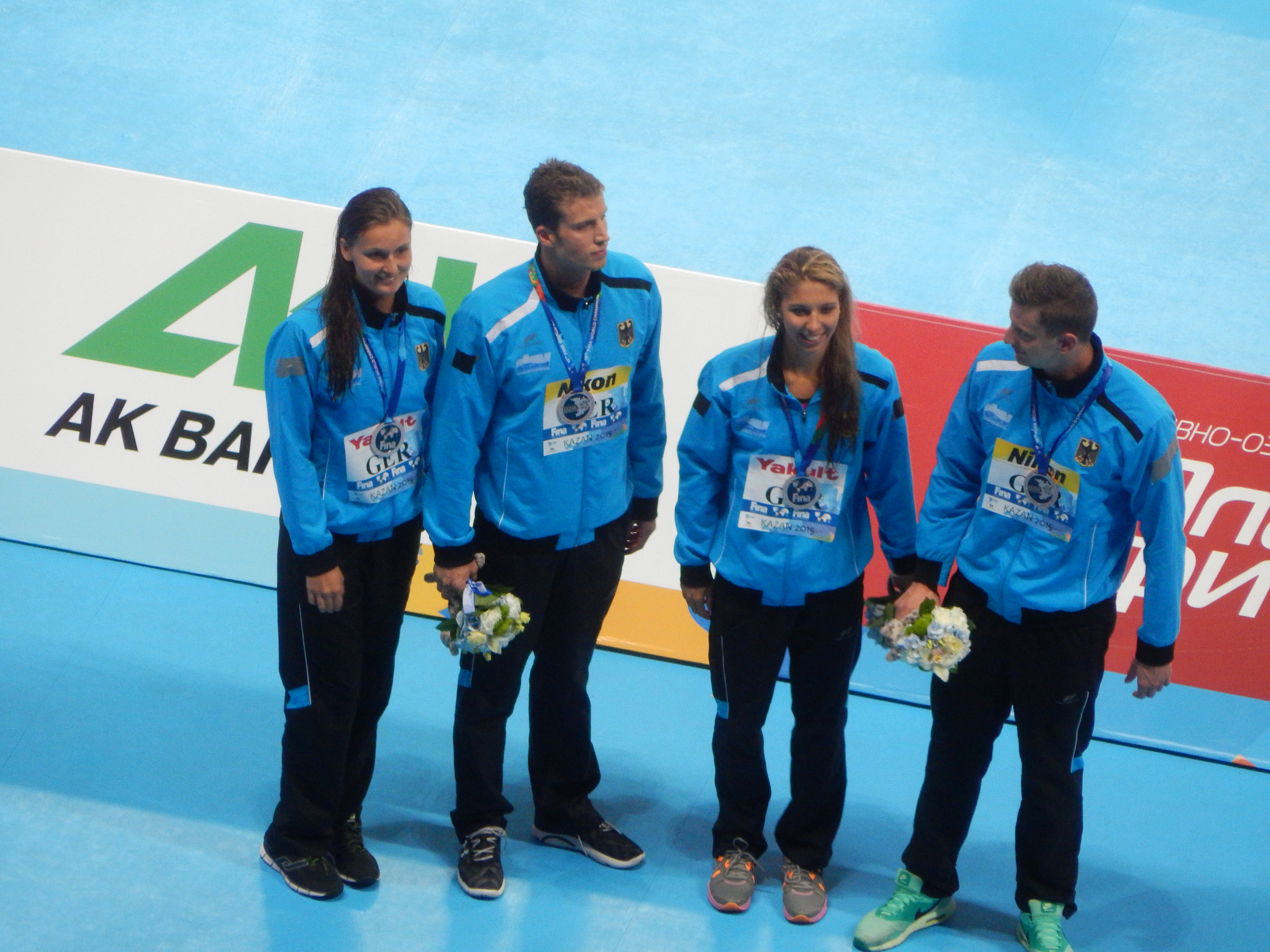
Team Germany

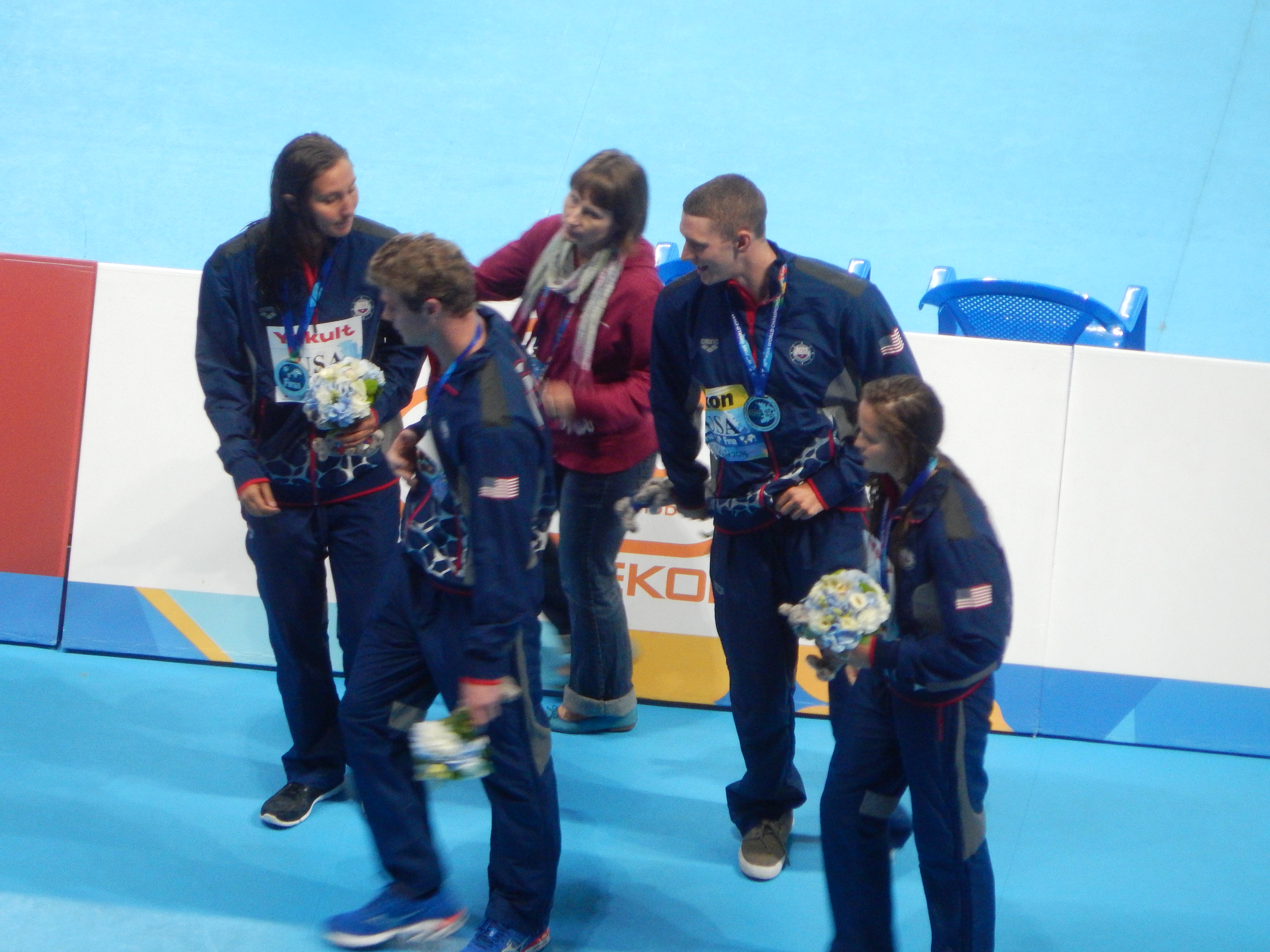
Team USA

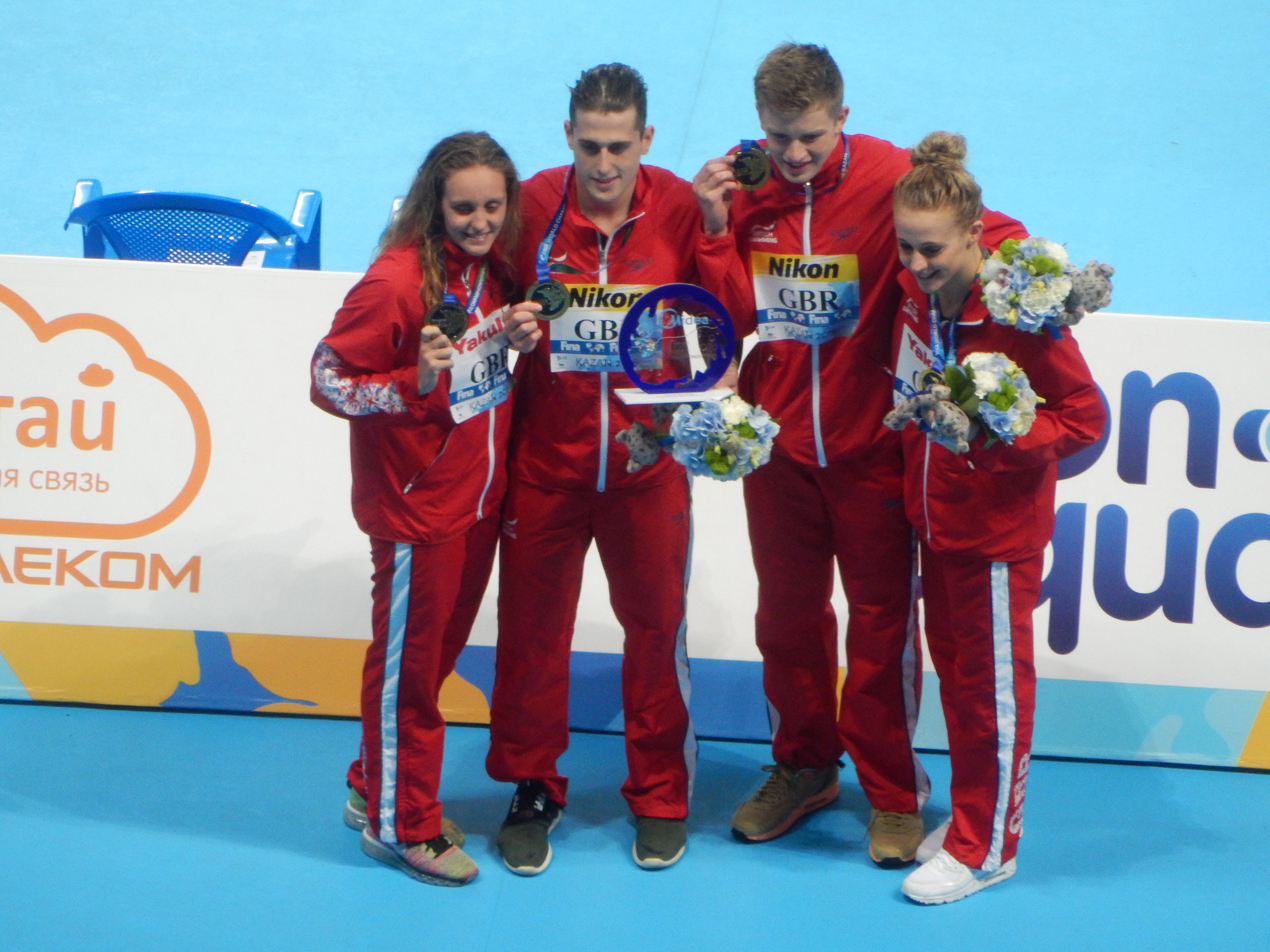
Team UK
