= Bolivia at the 2017 World Aquatics Championships =

- Flag of Bolivia
- World Aquatics code: BOL
- National federation: Federación Boliviana de Natación
- Website: www.febona.org

in Budapest, Hungary
- Competitors: 6 in 2 sports
- Medals: Gold 0 Silver 0 Bronze 0 Total 0

World Aquatics Championships appearances
- 1973; 1975; 1978; 1982; 1986; 1991; 1994; 1998; 2001; 2003; 2005; 2007; 2009; 2011; 2013; 2015; 2017; 2019; 2022; 2023; 2024; 2025

Bolivia is scheduled to compete at the 2017 World Aquatics Championships in Budapest, Hungary from 14 July to 30 July.

== Open water swimming ==
Bolivia has entered two open water swimmers

Athlete	Event	Time	Rank
Rodrigo Caballero	Men's 5 km	57:33.5	48
Rodrigo Caballero	Men's 10 km	2:01:59.1	53
Zedheir Torrez	Men's 5 km	1:02:36.8	58
Zedheir Torrez	Men's 10 km	2:10:34.1	62

== Swimming ==
Bolivia has received a Universality invitation from FINA to send a maximum of four swimmers (two men and two women) to the World Championships.

Athlete	Event	Heat		Semifinal		Final	
Athlete	Event	Time	Rank	Time	Rank	Time	Rank
Santiago Cavanagh	Men's 50 m breaststroke	29.29	49	did not advance			
Santiago Cavanagh	Men's 100 m breaststroke	1:04.58	53	did not advance			
José Alberto Quintanilla	Men's 50 m freestyle	24.43	90	did not advance			
José Alberto Quintanilla	Men's 50 m butterfly	25.35	54	did not advance			
Karen Torrez	Women's 50 m freestyle	26.16	38	did not advance			
Karen Torrez	Women's 100 m freestyle	57.28	39	did not advance			
María José Ribera	Women's 50 m backstroke	31.53	53	did not advance			
María José Ribera	Women's 50 m butterfly	28.48	42	did not advance			
