= Dominican Republic at the 2015 World Aquatics Championships =

- Flag of the Dominican Republic
- World Aquatics code: DOM
- National federation: Federación Dominicana de Natación
- Website: www.fedona.org

in Kazan, Russia
- Competitors: 5 in 2 sports
- Medals: Gold 0 Silver 0 Bronze 0 Total 0

World Aquatics Championships appearances
- 1973; 1975; 1978; 1982; 1986; 1991; 1994; 1998; 2001; 2003; 2005; 2007; 2009; 2011; 2013; 2015; 2017; 2019; 2022; 2023; 2024; 2025

Dominican Republic competed at the 2015 World Aquatics Championships in Kazan, Russia from 24 July to 9 August 2015.

== Diving ==
Dominican Republic divers qualified for the individual spots at the World Championships.

Men

Athlete	Event	Preliminaries		Semifinals		Final	
Athlete	Event	Points	Rank	Points	Rank	Points	Rank
Frandiel Gómez	1 m springboard	282.35	33	—N/a		did not advance	
Frandiel Gómez	3 m springboard	318.60	49	did not advance			
Frandiel Gómez	10 m platform	306.95	43	did not advance			

== Swimming ==
Dominican Republic swimmers have achieved qualifying standards in the following events (up to a maximum of 2 swimmers in each event at the A-standard entry time, and 1 at the B-standard):

Men

Athlete	Event	Heat		Semifinal		Final	
Athlete	Event	Time	Rank	Time	Rank	Time	Rank
Jean Luis Gómez	100 m backstroke	59.69	55	did not advance			
Jean Luis Gómez	200 m individual medley	2:09.59	45	did not advance			
Jhonny Pérez	50 m freestyle	24.11	58	did not advance			
Jhonny Pérez	100 m freestyle	53.16	80	did not advance			

Women

Athlete	Event	Heat		Semifinal		Final	
Athlete	Event	Time	Rank	Time	Rank	Time	Rank
Dorian McMenemy	50 m freestyle	26.87	55	did not advance			
Dorian McMenemy	100 m freestyle	59.37	63	did not advance			
Arianna Sanna	200 m freestyle	2:07.24	51	did not advance			
Arianna Sanna	400 m freestyle	4:39.87	47	—N/a		did not advance	

Mixed

Athlete	Event	Heat		Final	
Athlete	Event	Time	Rank	Time	Rank
Jhonny Pérez; Arianna Sanna; Dorian McMenemy; Jean Luis Gómez	4 × 100 m freestyle relay	3:43.85	18	did not advance	
Arianna Sanna; Jean Luis Gómez; Dorian McMenemy; Jhonny Pérez	4 × 100 m medley relay	4:19.79	24	did not advance	
