= Bolivia at the 2015 World Aquatics Championships =

- Flag of Bolivia
- FINA code: BOL
- National federation: Federación Boliviana de Natación
- Website: www.febona.org

in Kazan, Russia
- Competitors: 7 in 2 sports
- Medals: Gold 0 Silver 0 Bronze 0 Total 0

World Aquatics Championships appearances
- 1973; 1975; 1978; 1982; 1986; 1991; 1994; 1998; 2001; 2003; 2005; 2007; 2009; 2011; 2013; 2015; 2017; 2019; 2022; 2023; 2024

Bolivia competed at the 2015 World Aquatics Championships in Kazan, Russia from 24 July to 9 August 2015.

== Open water swimming ==
Bolivia has qualified two swimmers to compete in the open water marathon.

Athlete	Event	Time	Rank
Walter Caballero	Men's 5 km	59:50.8	40
Walter Caballero	Men's 10 km	2:08:15.3	62
Alondra Castillo	Women's 5 km	1:10:27.4	38
Alondra Castillo	Women's 10 km	OTL	

== Swimming ==
Bolivian swimmers have achieved qualifying standards in the following events (up to a maximum of 2 swimmers in each event at the A-standard entry time, and 1 at the B-standard):

Men

Athlete	Event	Heat		Semifinal		Final	
Athlete	Event	Time	Rank	Time	Rank	Time	Rank
Aldo Castillo	100 m butterfly	57.38	57	did not advance			
Aldo Castillo	200 m butterfly	2:15.38	39	did not advance			
José Quintanilla	50 m freestyle	24.19	61	did not advance			
José Quintanilla	100 m breaststroke	1:08.36	68	did not advance			

Women

Athlete	Event	Heat		Semifinal		Final	
Athlete	Event	Time	Rank	Time	Rank	Time	Rank
Maria José Ribera	50 m butterfly	29.22	47	did not advance			
Maria José Ribera	100 m butterfly	1:07.09	60	did not advance			
Karen Torrez	50 m freestyle	26.41	52	did not advance			
Karen Torrez	100 m freestyle	57.93	53	did not advance			

Mixed

Athlete	Event	Heat		Final	
Athlete	Event	Time	Rank	Time	Rank
Andrew Rutherfurd; Maria José Ribera; Karen Torrez; Aldo Castillo	4 × 100 m freestyle relay	3:46.46	20	did not advance	
Andrew Rutherfurd; José Quintanilla; Karen Torrez; Maria José Ribera	4 × 100 m medley relay	4:12.49	18	did not advance	
