= Bolivia at the 2011 World Aquatics Championships =

- Flag of Bolivia
- FINA code: BOL
- National federation: Federación Boliviana de Natación
- Website: www.febona.org

in Shanghai, China
- Medals: Gold 0 Silver 0 Bronze 0 Total 0

World Aquatics Championships appearances
- 1973; 1975; 1978; 1982; 1986; 1991; 1994; 1998; 2001; 2003; 2005; 2007; 2009; 2011; 2013; 2015; 2017; 2019; 2022; 2023; 2024

Bolivia competed at the 2011 World Aquatics Championships in Shanghai, China between July 16 and 31, 2011.

== Swimming ==
Bolivia qualified 3 swimmers.

Men

Athlete	Event	Heats		Semifinals		Final	
Athlete	Event	Time	Rank	Time	Rank	Time	Rank
Andrew Rutherfurd	Men's 100m Freestyle	53.57	67	did not advance			
Andrew Rutherfurd	Men's 200m Breaststroke	2:30.78	53	did not advance			
Tarco Liobet	Men's 100m Breaststroke	1:09.80	74	did not advance			
Tarco Liobet	Men's 200m Breaststroke	2:30.98	54	did not advance			

Women

Athlete	Event	Heats		Semifinals		Final	
Athlete	Event	Time	Rank	Time	Rank	Time	Rank
Karen Torrez	Women's 50m Freestyle	27.08	39	did not advance			
Karen Torrez	Women's 100m Freestyle	58.05	45	did not advance			
