= Bolivia at the 2013 World Aquatics Championships =

- Flag of Bolivia
- FINA code: BOL
- National federation: Federación Boliviana de Natación
- Website: www.febona.org

in Barcelona, Spain
- Competitors: 5 in 1 sports
- Medals: Gold 0 Silver 0 Bronze 0 Total 0

World Aquatics Championships appearances
- 1973; 1975; 1978; 1982; 1986; 1991; 1994; 1998; 2001; 2003; 2005; 2007; 2009; 2011; 2013; 2015; 2017; 2019; 2022; 2023; 2024

Bolivia is competing at the 2013 World Aquatics Championships in Barcelona, Spain between 19 July and 4 August 2013.

== Open water swimming ==
Bolivia qualified two quota places for the following events in open water swimming.

| Athlete | Event | Time | Rank |
|---|---|---|---|
| Walter Caballero | Men's 5 km | 1:00:11.9 | 48 |
| María Aponte | Women's 5 km | 1:10:21.2 | 42 |

== Swimming ==
Bolivian swimmers earned qualifying standards in the following events (up to a maximum of 2 swimmers in each event at the A-standard entry time, and 1 at the B-standard):

Men

| Athlete | Event | Heat | | Semifinal | | Final | |
| Athlete | Event | Time | Rank | Time | Rank | Time | Rank |
|---|---|---|---|---|---|---|---|
| Andrew Rutherfurd | 50 m breaststroke | 30.29 | 60 | did not advance | | | |
| Andrew Rutherfurd | 100 m freestyle | 52.79 | 57 | did not advance | | | |

Women

| Athlete | Event | Heat | | Semifinal | | Final | |
| Athlete | Event | Time | Rank | Time | Rank | Time | Rank |
|---|---|---|---|---|---|---|---|
| María José Ribera | 50 m butterfly | 29.23 | 44 | did not advance | | | |
| María José Ribera | 100 m butterfly | 1:07.02 | 47 | did not advance | | | |
| Karen Torrez | 50 m freestyle | 26.69 | 43 | did not advance | | | |
| Karen Torrez | 100 m freestyle | 58.27 | 49 | did not advance | | | |
