= Bolivia at the 2023 World Aquatics Championships =

- Flag of Bolivia
- FINA code: BOL
- National federation: Swimming Federation of Bolivia
- Website: febona.info

in Fukuoka, Japan
- Competitors: 7 in 2 sports
- Medals: Gold 0 Silver 0 Bronze 0 Total 0

World Aquatics Championships appearances
- 1973; 1975; 1978; 1982; 1986; 1991; 1994; 1998; 2001; 2003; 2005; 2007; 2009; 2011; 2013; 2015; 2017; 2019; 2022; 2023; 2024

Bolivia is set to compete at the 2023 World Aquatics Championships in Fukuoka, Japan from 14 to 30 July.

== Open water swimming ==
Bolivia entered 4 open water swimmers.

Men

Athlete	Event	Time	Rank
David Calderón	Men's 10 km	DNF	
Alejandro Plaza	Men's 5 km	OTL	

Women

Athlete	Event	Time	Rank
Sabrina Condori	Women's 5 km	DNS	
Fernanda Ramírez	Women's 10 km	OTL	

== Swimming ==
Bolivia entered 4 swimmers.

Men

Athlete	Event	Heat		Semifinal		Final	
Athlete	Event	Time	Rank	Time	Rank	Time	Rank
Esteban Nuñez del Prado	100 metre butterfly	55.26	50	Did not advance			
Esteban Nuñez del Prado	200 metre individual medley	2:06.60	39	Did not advance			
José Alberto Quintanilla	50 metre freestyle	24.06	70	Did not advance			
José Alberto Quintanilla	100 metre freestyle	53.32	84	Did not advance			

Women

Athlete	Event	Heat		Semifinal		Final	
Athlete	Event	Time	Rank	Time	Rank	Time	Rank
Adriana Giles	100 metre freestyle	59.17	41	Did not advance			
Adriana Giles	100 metre butterfly	1:05.70	45	Did not advance			
María José Ribera	50 metre freestyle	26.37	48	Did not advance			
María José Ribera	50 metre butterfly	28.58	41	Did not advance			
