= Bolivia at the 2024 World Aquatics Championships =

- Flag of Bolivia
- FINA code: BOL
- National federation: Swimming Federation of Bolivia
- Website: febona.org

in Doha, Qatar
- Competitors: 7 in 2 sports
- Medals: Gold 0 Silver 0 Bronze 0 Total 0

World Aquatics Championships appearances
- 1973; 1975; 1978; 1982; 1986; 1991; 1994; 1998; 2001; 2003; 2005; 2007; 2009; 2011; 2013; 2015; 2017; 2019; 2022; 2023; 2024

Bolivia competed at the 2024 World Aquatics Championships in Doha, Qatar from 2 to 18 February.

== Competitors ==
The following is the list of competitors in the Championships.

Sport	Men	Women	Total
Open water swimming	2	1	3
Swimming	2	2	4
Total	4	3	7

== Open water swimming ==
Men

Athlete	Event	Time	Rank
Alejandro Plaza	Men's 10 km	OTL	
Diego Solano	Men's 5 km	1:00:47.3	68

Women

Athlete	Event	Time	Rank
María Rodríguez	Women's 5 km	OTL	

== Swimming ==
Bolivia entered 4 swimmers.

Men

Athlete	Event	Heat		Semifinal		Final	
Athlete	Event	Time	Rank	Time	Rank	Time	Rank
Esteban Nuñez del Prado	100 metre butterfly	56.68	48	Did not advance			
Esteban Nuñez del Prado	200 metre individual medley	DSQ		Did not advance			
José Alberto Quintanilla	50 metre freestyle	23.87	60	Did not advance			
José Alberto Quintanilla	100 metre freestyle	53.08	77	Did not advance			

Women

Athlete	Event	Heat		Semifinal		Final	
Athlete	Event	Time	Rank	Time	Rank	Time	Rank
Adriana Giles	50 metre freestyle	26.60	48	Did not advance			
Adriana Giles	100 metre freestyle	58.53	35	Did not advance			
Naiara Roca	50 metre breaststroke	35.20	36	Did not advance			
Naiara Roca	100 metre breaststroke	1:16.41	46	Did not advance			
