= National anthem of Bolivia =

Himno Nacional de Bolivia
English: National Anthem of Bolivia
- Coat of arms of Bolivia
- National anthem of Bolivia
- Also known as: Bolivianos, el Hado Propicio (English: Bolivians, A Propitious Fate); Canción Patriótica (English: Patriotic Song)
- Lyrics: José Ignacio de Sanjinés
- Music: Leopoldo Benedetto Vincenti
- Adopted: 1851

Audio sample
- U.S. Navy Band instrumental version (one verse and chorus): file; help

The national anthem of Bolivia (himno nacional de Bolivia), also known by its incipit "Bolivians, the Propitious Fate" (Bolivianos, el Hado Propicio) and by its original title "Patriotic Song" (Canción Patriótica), was adopted in 1851. José Ignacio de Sanjinés, a signer of both the Bolivian Declaration of Independence and the first Bolivian Constitution, wrote the lyrics. The music was composed by an Italian, Leopoldo Benedetto Vincenti.

It is a march in 4/4 time, although it is popularly sung in 12/8. It was premiered in the city of La Paz, in front of the Palacio de Gobierno, at noon on 18 November 1845, by about 90 instrumentalists belonging to the military bands of the 5th, 6th and 8th battalions. That day, the fourth anniversary of the Battle of Ingavi was celebrated with several acts of extraordinary magnitude, a highlight of which was the opening of the Municipal Theatre.

In 1851, during the government of General Manuel Isidoro Belzu, the national anthem of Bolivia was made official by a supreme decree. It was then printed for distribution in schools. It has since been performed and sung in all official school functions.

== History ==
=== Background ===
In the city of Chuquisaca (modern Sucre) in 1835, the composition called "Marcha Nacional" ("National March") came to light, the first national anthem, the work of the Peruvian teacher Pedro Ximénez Abril Tirado, who was the chapelmaster of Chuquisaca Cathedral. This composition did not become official, quite possibly due to the creation, organization and subsequent elimination of the Peru–Bolivian Confederation (1836–1839).

The original scores are found in the Historical Archive of Chuquisaca Cathedral, where they are part of the musical heritage of Bolivia. A piano performance, performed by the teacher María Antonieta García Meza de Pacheco, exists in a compilation on CD as a tribute to the work of Ximenez Abrill Tirado.

=== National anthem ===
Once the independence and sovereignty of Bolivia were consolidated in the Battle of Ingavi on 18 November 1841, the need for a patriotic song was noted again because General José Ballivián, then president of Bolivia, noted that small bands of the Army were not managing to conquer popular fervor by performing inherited Spanish marches and popular pieces.

It was under these circumstances that Ballivián learned of the visit to Chile of Italian teacher and composer Leopoldo Benedetto Vincenti, whom he invited in 1844 to exercise the position of general director of bands of the Bolivian army and to compose, under contract, the music of the "Canción Patriótica" ("Patriotic Song"), under which name it was to be known at the time. Vincenti arrived in La Paz in September 1844 and found the musical bands in a dire state, as could be established in his family letters. His work was exhausting; many times, he went to bed dressed to go to the barracks at dawn. The trials were long and pressing. Vincenti rejected one text after another; it was then that lawyer and poet José Ignacio Sanjinéz presented him with the verses of what is now the Bolivian national anthem, originally written in Spanish.

In the La Paz Plaza Murillo at noon on 18 November 1845, after Te Deum was performed at the Cathedral of La Paz in honor of the Battle of Ingavi, the military bands of the Battalions 5th, 6th and 8th played, for the first time, the chords of the Bolivian national anthem. Ballivián came out excited to one of the balconies of the Palacio Quemado, profusely congratulating the performance.

That same night, simultaneously, the Municipal Theatre of La Paz was premiered in a lyrical-musical program, a central part of which was the interpretation of the "Canción Patriótica". The new theatre was packed: the president of the republic, José Ballivián, attended with his cabinet; prefectural, municipal, and public authorities gathered.

== Lyrics ==
The first verse and chorus are usually performed at official events. If brevity is required, only the chorus may be performed.

=== Spanish original ===
Spanish lyrics

I
Bolivianos: el hado propicio
coronó nuestros votos y anhelo. (Note: Anhelo is sometimes written anhelos.)
Es ya libre, ya libre este suelo, (Note: Occasionally written and sung as Es ya libre, es ya libre este suelo.)
ya cesó su servil condición.

Al estruendo marcial que ayer fuera
y al clamor de la guerra horroroso, (Note: Occasionally written and sung without the initial y.)
𝄆 siguen hoy, en contraste armonioso,
dulces himnos de paz y de unión. 𝄇

Coro:
De la Patria, el alto nombre,
en glorioso esplendor conservemos.
Y en sus aras de nuevo juremos:
¡Morir antes que esclavos vivir!
¡Morir antes que esclavos vivir!
¡Morir antes que esclavos vivir!

II
Loor eterno a los bravos guerreros,
cuyo heroico valor y firmeza,
conquistaron las glorias que empieza
hoy Bolivia feliz a gozar.

Que sus nombres, en mármol y en bronce,
a remotas edades transmitan,
𝄆 y en sonoros cantares repitan:
¡Libertad, Libertad, Libertad! 𝄇

Coro

III
Aquí alzó la justicia su trono
que la vil opresión desconoce,
y en su timbre glorioso legose
libertad, libertad, libertad.

Esta tierra innocente y hermosa
que ha debido a Bolívar su nombre
𝄆 es la patria feliz donde el hombre
goza el bien de la dicha y la paz. 𝄇

Coro

IV
Si extranjero poder algún día
sojuzgar a Bolivia intentare,
al destino fatal se prepare
que amenaza a soberbio agresor.

Que los hijos del grande Bolívar
han ya mil y mil veces jurado:
𝄆 morir antes que ver humillado
de la Patria el augusto pendón. 𝄇

Coro

English translation

I
Bolivians, a propitious fate
has at long last crowned our vows and longings;
This land is free, free at last.
Its servile state has now finally ceased.

The martial turmoil of yesterday,
and the horrible clamor of war,
𝄆 are followed today, in harmonious contrast,
by sweet hymns of peace and unity. 𝄇

Chorus:
Let us keep the lofty name of our Fatherland
in glorious splendor.
And, on its altars, once more we must swear:
To die before we would live as slaves!
To die before we would live as slaves!
To die before we would live as slaves!

II
Eternal praise to the brave warriors
whose heroic valor and firmness
conquered the freedom and glories that now
a happy Bolivia justly begins to enjoy!

Let their names, preserved forever in marble and bronze,
transmit their glory to remote future ages.
𝄆 And in resounding songs let them repeat:
Freedom! Freedom! Freedom! 𝄇

Chorus

III
Here has Justice erected its throne
which vile oppression ignores
and, on its glorious laurel it bequeathed us
Freedom, freedom, freedom

This innocent and beautiful land,
which owes its name to Bolívar,
𝄆 is the happy homeland where mankind
enjoys the benefits of bliss and peace. 𝄇

Chorus

IV
If a foreigner may, any given day
even attempt to subjugate Bolivia,
let him prepare for a fatal destiny,
which menaces such haughty aggressor.

For the sons of the mighty Bolívar
have sworn, thousands upon thousands of times:
𝄆 to die rather than see the country's
majestic banner humiliated. 𝄇

Chorus

=== In indigenous languages ===
Aymara lyrics

I
Bolivian jaqinakatakixa
Phuqhasiw jiwasan suyt'ataru
Qhisphiyataw qhisphiyataw markasaxa
T'aqisit jakañax tukusxiw.

Ch'axwañanakana sarnakaña
Nuwasiñas warariñas tukusxiwa,
𝄆 Uka ch'axwañanakata mistusïna,
Jichhürux kusisit q'uchuñän. 𝄇

Taq'itaki:
Markasäna, suma sutipa,
Jach'ar aptasa suma arsuñäni,
Markasatxa sayt'asipxañäni:
Jiwañan janïr t'aqiskasïn!
Jiwañan janïr t'aqiskasïn!
Jiwañan janïr t'aqiskasïn!

II
Wiñay q'uchuñaw wakt'istu,
Markaslayku jiwir jaqinakäru:
Jupanakaw markas ut'ayapxi,
Jichhurun kusisit jakañani.

Sutinakpax qilqantatawa,
Uka pachtapachaw jiwasax yatipxtana,
𝄆 Wali ch'amamp arsuñasawa:
Qhisphiyataw, qhisphiyataw, qhisphiyataw! 𝄇

Taq'itaki

Aymara IPA (Note: See Help:IPA and Aymara language § Phonology.)

1
[bo.li.vjan ha.qe.na.ka.ta.ke.χa]
[pʰo.qʰa.siw hi.wa.san suj.tʼa.ta.ɾu]
[qʰes.pʰja.taw qʰes.pʰja.taw maɾ.ka.sa.χa]
[tʼa.qe.sit ha.ka.ɲaχ tu.kus.χew]

[t͡ʃʼaχ.wa.ɲa.na.ka.na saɾ.na.ka.ɲa]
[nu.wa.si.ɲas wa.ɾa.ɾi.ɲas tu.kus.χe.wa]
𝄆 [u.ka t͡ʃʼaχ.wa.ɲa.na.ka.ta mis.tu.siː.na]
[hi.t͡ʃʰuː.ɾuχ ku.si.sit qʼo.t͡ʃu.ɲaːn] 𝄇

[ta.qʼi.ta.ki]
[maɾ.ka.saː.na su.ma su.ti.pa]
[ha.t͡ʃʼaɾ ap.ta.sa su.ma aɾ.su.ɲaː.ni]
[maɾ.ka.sat.χa saj.tʼa.sip.χa.ɲaː.ni]
[hi.wa.ɲan ha.niːɾ tʼa.qes.ka.siːn]
[hi.wa.ɲan ha.niːɾ tʼa.qes.ka.siːn]
[hi.wa.ɲan ha.niːɾ tʼa.qes.ka.siːn]

2
[wi.ɲaj qʼo.t͡ʃu.ɲaw wak.tʼis.tu]
[maɾ.kas.laj.ku hi.wiɾ ha.qe.na.kaː.ɾu]
𝄆 [hu.pa.na.kaw maɾ.kas u.tʼa.jap.χe]
[hi.t͡ʃʰu.ɾun ku.si.sit ha.ka.ɲa.ni] 𝄇

[su.ti.nak.paχ qel.qan.ta.ta.wa]
[u.ka pat͡ʃ.ta.pa.t͡ʃaw hi.wa.saχ ja.tipχ.ta.na]
[wa.li t͡ʃʼa.mamp aɾ.su.ɲa.sa.wa]
[qʰes.pʰja.taw qʰes.pʰja.taw qʰes.pʰja.taw]

[ta.qʼi.ta.ki]

Quechua lyrics

I
Qullasuyunchik may sumaqchasqa
munasqanchikmanjina junt'akun,
kacharisqaña kay llaqtanchikqa
ñak'ariy kamachiypi kaymanta.

Allin sinchi ch'aqwa qayna karqa
Tinkupi q'upaypi qhapariynin
𝄆 Kunanqa t'inkisqa may kusiypi
Misk'i takiyninchikwan jukchasqa. 𝄇

Coro:
Llaqtanchikpa jatun sutinta
Sumaq kusiy k'anchaypi (Note: Sometimes written kawsaypi ([kæw.sæj.pɪ]).) jap'inanchik
Sutinrayku tatalitananchik
Kamachi kanata wañuna.
Kamachi kanata wañuna.
Kamachi kanata wañuna.

Quechua IPA (Note: See Help:IPA/Quechua and Quechuan languages § Phonology.)

1
[qɔ.ʎæ.sʊ.jʊn.t͡ʃɪɣ‿mæj sʊ.mæʁ.t͡ʃæs.ɢɑ]
[mʊ.næs.ɢɑn.t͡ʃɪɣ.mæn.hi.næ hʊn.tʼæ.kʊn]
[kæ.t͡ʃæ.ɾɪs.ɢɑ.ɲæ kæj ʎæχ.tæn.t͡ʃɪx.ɢɑ]
[ɲæ.kʼæ.ɾij kæ.mæ.t͡ʃɪj.pi kæj.mæn.tæ]

[æ.ʎin sin.t͡ʃi t͡ʃʼɑʁ.wæ qɑj.næ kæɾ.ʁɑ]
[tɪn.kʊ.pi qʼɔ.pæj.pi qʰɑ.pæ.ɾij.nin]
𝄆 [kʊ.næn.ɢɑ tʼɪn.kis.ɢɑ mæj kʊ.sɪj.pi]
[mɪs.kʼi tæ.kij.nin.t͡ʃɪɣ.wæn hʊx.t͡ʃæs.ɢɑ] 𝄇

[ko.ɾo]
[ʎæχ.tæn.t͡ʃɪx.pæ hæ.tʊn sʊ.tin.tæ]
[sʊ.mæχ kʊ.sɪj kʼæn.t͡ʃæj.pi hæpʼ.ʔɪ.næn.t͡ʃɪx]
[sʊ.tɪn.ɾæj.kʊ tæ.tæ.li.tæ.næn.t͡ʃɪx]
[kæ.mæ.t͡ʃi kæ.næ.tæ wæ.ɲʊ.næ]
[kæ.mæ.t͡ʃi kæ.næ.tæ wæ.ɲʊ.næ]
[kæ.mæ.t͡ʃi kæ.næ.tæ wæ.ɲʊ.næ]

Guaraní lyrics

I
Mboriviaygua jerovia tuichague
temimbota jaipotavae ojeapoma,
ojejorama kuae ñandeyvy
opama tembiokuairã jaikovae.

Maemegua pychyĩ oñenduama
ñandeypy (Note: Occasionally written ñendeypy.) reta hokope omano,
𝄆 ipoepykape añave jaiko vaerã
mboroayu reve pãve kuae yvype. 𝄇

Coro:
Ñamboeteuka ñandeyvy
yvate rupi hembipe jaechauka,
jasapukai metei rami:
Ngaraama tembipyrã jaikoje!
Ngaraama tembipyrã jaikoje!
Ngaraama tembipyrã jaikoje!

Guaraní IPA (Note: See Help:IPA, Guarani language § Phonology and Guarani alphabet.)

1
[ᵐbo.ɾi.ʋjaɨ̯.wa ᵈje.ɾo.ʋja tui̯.ɕa.we]
[te.mi.ᵐbo.ta ᵈjai̯.po.ta.ʋae̯ o.ᵈjea̯.po.ma]
[o.ᵈje.ᵈjo.ɾa.ma kʷae̯ ɲa.ⁿde.ɨ.ʋɨ]
[o.pa.ma te.ᵐbjo.kʷai̯.ɾã ᵈjai̯.ko.ʋae̯]

[mae̯.me.wa pɨ.ɕɨ.ĩ o.ɲe.ⁿdu.a.ma]
[ɲa.ⁿde.ɨ.pɨ ɾe.ta ho.ko.pe o.ma.no]
𝄆 [i.poe̯.pɨ.ka.pe a.ɲa.ʋe ᵈjai̯.ko ʋae̯.ɾã]
[ᵐbo.ɾoa̯(.)ɨu̯ ɾeʋ(e) pã.ʋe kʷai̯(‿)ɨ.ʋɨ.pe] 𝄇

[ko.ɾo]
[ɲa.ᵐboe̯.teu̯.ka ɲa.ⁿde.ɨ.ʋɨ]
[ɨ.ʋa.te ɾu.pi he.ᵐbi.pe ᵈja.e.ɕau̯.ka]
[ᵈja.sa.pu.kai̯ me.tei̯ ɾa.mi]
[ᵑɡa.ɾaː.ma te.ᵐbi.pɨ.ɾã ᵈjai̯.ko.ᵈje]
[ᵑɡa.ɾaː.ma te.ᵐbi.pɨ.ɾã ᵈjai̯.ko.ᵈje]
[ᵑɡa.ɾaː.ma te.ᵐbi.pɨ.ɾã ᵈjai̯.ko.ᵈje]

Trinitario Moxos lyrics

I
Bolivianos Viuusamrecre viti
Titecpopo yvoo"ogne viti
Tiuchcu"po pjoca vye"e "pog"e
Tputaimaretovopo to naemponnosiravi

Tiutsio"choo"ini "chopegiene nae"rorisra
Taegnepo to "chopegiene guerra
𝄆 Tcutcucompo tiuriono tajicho
Taegnepo titotijvocrepo vjirosare 𝄇

Coro:
Pjoca "pog"e toonagne taéjare
Vechpojricgienenajíchapo viti
Te tamíro"u vijroca vechjiriivo
Vepenapo vovcuquimponnojcosi.
Vepenapo vovcuquimponnojcosi.
Vepenapo vovcuquimponnojcosi.

Trinitario Moxos IPA (Note: See Help:IPA and es:Idioma trinitario § Fonología.)

1
[bo.li.vja.nos βʲuː.sam.ɾek.ɾe βi.ti]
[ti.tek.po.po i.voː.ʔoç.ne βi.ti]
[tjut͡ʃ.kuʔ.po pho.ka βje.ʔe ʔpoç.ʔe]
[(pu.tai̯.ma.)ɾe.to.βo.po to nə͡em.pon.no.si.ɾa.βi]

[tju.t͡sʲoʔ.t͡ʃoː.ʔi.ni ʔt͡ʃo.pe.çʲe.ne nə͡eʔ.ɾo.ɾis.ɾa]
[tə͡eç.ne.po to ʔt͡ʃo.pe.çʲe.ne ge.ra]
𝄆 [kut.ku.kom.po tju.ɾʲo.no ta.hi.t͡ʃo]
[tə͡eç.ne.po ti.to.ti.hʷok.ɾe.po βʲi.ɾo.sa.ɾe] 𝄇

[ko.ɾo]
[pʲo.ka ʔpoç.ʔe toː.naç.ne tə͡e.ha.ɾe]
[βet͡ʃ.poh.ɾik.çʲe.ne.na.hi.t͡ʃa.po βi.ti]
[te ta.mi.ɾo.ʔu βih.ɾo.ka βet͡ʃ.hi.ɾiː.βo]
[βe.pe.na.po βoβ.ku.kim.pon.noh.ko.si]
[βe.pe.na.po βoβ.ku.kim.pon.noh.ko.si]
[βe.pe.na.po βoβ.ku.kim.pon.noh.ko.si]

== See also ==
- Read full texts on Wikisource
- Read full Spanish texts on the Spanish Wikisource
