= Dominican Republic at the 2011 World Aquatics Championships =

- Flag of the Dominican Republic
- FINA code: DOM
- National federation: Federación Dominicana de Natación
- Website: www.fedona.org

in Shanghai, China
- Competitors: 3 in 1 sports
- Medals: Gold 0 Silver 0 Bronze 0 Total 0

World Aquatics Championships appearances
- 1973; 1975; 1978; 1982; 1986; 1991; 1994; 1998; 2001; 2003; 2005; 2007; 2009; 2011; 2013; 2015; 2017; 2019; 2022; 2023; 2024

Dominican Republic competed at the 2011 World Aquatics Championships in Shanghai, China between July 16 and 31, 2011.

== Swimming ==
Dominican Republic qualified 3 swimmers.

Men

Athlete	Event	Heats		Semifinals		Final	
Athlete	Event	Time	Rank	Time	Rank	Time	Rank
Nicholas Schwab	Men's 200m Freestyle	1:54.95	47	did not advance			
Nicholas Schwab	Men's 400m Freestyle	4:08.40	40			did not advance	
Rommie Benjamin	Men's 100m Butterfly	57.11	51	did not advance			
Rommie Benjamin	Men's 200m Butterfly	2:06.75	40	did not advance			

Women

Athlete	Event	Heats		Semifinals		Final	
Athlete	Event	Time	Rank	Time	Rank	Time	Rank
Dorian McMenemy	Women's 50m Butterfly	29.37	36	did not advance			
Dorian McMenemy	Women's 100m Butterfly	1:06.58	46	did not advance			
