= José Ignacio de Sanjinés =

Bolivian poet and legislator (1786–1864)

José Ignacio de Sanjinés Barriga (1786 – August 15, 1864) was a Bolivian poet and legislator.

== Background and relation with historical events ==
Born in Chuquisaca, he was a delegate to the Asambleas Deliberante y Constituyente (Deliberative and Constituent Assemblies) of 1825 and 1826, when Bolivia first became an independent republic.

He signed the Bolivian Declaration of Independence and the first Bolivian Constitution.

== Writer of lyrics of Bolivian national anthem ==
Sanjinés is perhaps best known for writing the lyrics to the National Anthem of Bolivia.

=== Themes of lyrics ===
His lyrics were meant to inspire patriotism, hatred of tyranny and love of freedom, and admiration for Bolivian soldiers who had recently won Bolivia's war of independence against Spain.

== Death ==
He died in Sucre in 1864.
