= Bolivia at the 2019 World Aquatics Championships =

- Flag of Bolivia
- FINA code: BOL
- National federation: Bolivian Swimming Federation
- Website: febona.org (in Spanish)

in Gwangju, South Korea
- Competitors: 7 in 2 sports
- Medals: Gold 0 Silver 0 Bronze 0 Total 0

World Aquatics Championships appearances
- 1973; 1975; 1978; 1982; 1986; 1991; 1994; 1998; 2001; 2003; 2005; 2007; 2009; 2011; 2013; 2015; 2017; 2019; 2022; 2023; 2024

Bolivia competed at the 2019 World Aquatics Championships in Gwangju, South Korea from 12 to 28 July.

== Open water swimming ==
Bolivia qualified two male and one female open water swimmers.

Men

Athlete	Event	Time	Rank
Rodrigo Caballero	Men's 5 km	54:08.0	44
Rodrigo Caballero	Men's 10 km	1:59:41.5	62
Zedheir Torrez	Men's 5 km	1:00:36.2	54
Zedheir Torrez	Men's 10 km	2:08:27.7	70

Women

Athlete	Event	Time	Rank
Camila Mercado	Women's 5 km	1:11:17.4	52
Camila Mercado	Women's 10 km	2:23:09.7	62

== Swimming ==
Bolivia has entered four swimmers.

Men

Athlete	Event	Heat		Semifinal		Final	
Athlete	Event	Time	Rank	Time	Rank	Time	Rank
Gabriel Castillo	50 m backstroke	26.94	52	did not advance			
Gabriel Castillo	100 m backstroke	58.47	50	did not advance			
Santiago Cavanagh	50 m breaststroke	29.26	53	did not advance			
Santiago Cavanagh	100 m breaststroke	1:06.44	73	did not advance			

Women

Athlete	Event	Heat		Semifinal		Final	
Athlete	Event	Time	Rank	Time	Rank	Time	Rank
Alexis Margett	50 m butterfly	28.21	39	did not advance			
Alexis Margett	100 m butterfly	1:02.59	39	did not advance			
Karen Torrez	50 m freestyle	26.01	36	did not advance			
Karen Torrez	100 m freestyle	57.37	44	did not advance			
