= Bolivia at the 2022 World Aquatics Championships =

- Flag of Bolivia
- FINA code: BOL
- National federation: Swimming Federation of Bolivia

in Budapest, Hungary
- Competitors: 5 in 2 sports
- Medals: Gold 0 Silver 0 Bronze 0 Total 0

World Aquatics Championships appearances
- 1973; 1975; 1978; 1982; 1986; 1991; 1994; 1998; 2001; 2003; 2005; 2007; 2009; 2011; 2013; 2015; 2017; 2019; 2022; 2023; 2024

Bolivia competed at the 2022 World Aquatics Championships in Budapest, Hungary from 18 June to 3 July.

== Open water swimming ==
Athlete	Event	Time	Rank
Jaime Arevalo	Men's 5 km	1:07:42.1	52
Fernando Nava	Men's 5 km	OTL	
Leslie Rojas	Women's 5 km	OTL	

== Swimming ==
Athlete	Event	Heat		Semifinal		Final	
Athlete	Event	Time	Rank	Time	Rank	Time	Rank
Esteban Nuñez del Prado	Men's 100 m butterfly	55.61	50	did not advance			
Esteban Nuñez del Prado	Men's 200 m individual medley	DQ		did not advance			
Karen Torrez	Women's 50 m freestyle	26.46	39	did not advance			
Karen Torrez	Women's 100 m freestyle	58.96	34	did not advance			
