= Dominican Republic at the 2013 World Aquatics Championships =

- Flag of the Dominican Republic
- FINA code: DOM
- National federation: Federación Dominicana de Natación
- Website: www.fedona.org

in Barcelona, Spain
- Competitors: 6 in 2 sports
- Medals: Gold 0 Silver 0 Bronze 0 Total 0

World Aquatics Championships appearances
- 1973; 1975; 1978; 1982; 1986; 1991; 1994; 1998; 2001; 2003; 2005; 2007; 2009; 2011; 2013; 2015; 2017; 2019; 2022; 2023; 2024

Dominican Republic is competing at the 2013 World Aquatics Championships in Barcelona, Spain between 19 July and 4 August 2013.

== Diving ==
Dominican Republic qualified two quota places for the following diving events.

Men

| Athlete | Event | Preliminaries | | Semifinals | | Final | |
| Athlete | Event | Points | Rank | Points | Rank | Points | Rank |
|---|---|---|---|---|---|---|---|
| Argenis Alvarez | 3 m springboard | 200.75 | 46 | did not advance | | | |
| Frandiel Gomez | 3 m springboard | 309.10 | 41 | did not advance | | | |
| Argenis Alvarez; Frandiel Gomez | 3 m synchronized springboard | 323.46 | 16 | — | | did not advance | |

== Swimming ==
Dominican Republic swimmers achieved qualifying standards in the following events (up to a maximum of 2 swimmers in each event at the A-standard entry time, and 1 at the B-standard):

Men

| Athlete | Event | Heat | | Semifinal | | Final | |
| Athlete | Event | Time | Rank | Time | Rank | Time | Rank |
|---|---|---|---|---|---|---|---|
| Jean Luis Gómez | 100 m backstroke | 59.30 | 40 | did not advance | | | |
| Jean Luis Gómez | 200 m individual medley | 2:10.78 | 51 | did not advance | | | |
| Nicholas Schwab | 200 m freestyle | 1:53.07 | 49 | did not advance | | | |
| Nicholas Schwab | 400 m freestyle | 3:59.29 | 38 | — | | did not advance | |

Women

| Athlete | Event | Heat | | Semifinal | | Final | |
| Athlete | Event | Time | Rank | Time | Rank | Time | Rank |
|---|---|---|---|---|---|---|---|
| Dorian McMenemy | 50 m butterfly | 28.53 | 42 | did not advance | | | |
| Dorian McMenemy | 100 m butterfly | 1:03.53 | 37 | did not advance | | | |
| Vanessa Rivas | 50 m breaststroke | 34.52 | 57 | did not advance | | | |
| Vanessa Rivas | 100 m breaststroke | 1:14.77 | 48 | did not advance | | | |
