= Dominican Republic at the 2023 World Aquatics Championships =

- Flag of the Dominican Republic
- FINA code: DOM
- National federation: Federación Dominicana de Natación
- Website: www.fedona.org

in Fukuoka, Japan
- Competitors: 6 in 2 sports
- Medals: Gold 0 Silver Bronze 0 Total 0

World Aquatics Championships appearances
- 1973; 1975; 1978; 1982; 1986; 1991; 1994; 1998; 2001; 2003; 2005; 2007; 2009; 2011; 2013; 2015; 2017; 2019; 2022; 2023; 2024

Dominican Republic competed at the 2023 World Aquatics Championships in Fukuoka, Japan from 14 to 30 July.

== Diving ==
Dominican Republic entered 2 divers.

Men

| Athlete | Event | Preliminaries | | Semifinals | | Final | |
| Athlete | Event | Points | Rank | Points | Rank | Points | Rank |
|---|---|---|---|---|---|---|---|
| Frandiel Gómez | 1 m springboard | 289.60 | 37 | — | | Did not advance | |
| Frandiel Gómez | 3 m springboard | 278.00 | 55 | Did not advance | | | |
| Jonathan Ruvalcaba | 1 m springboard | 353.85 | 15 | — | | Did not advance | |
| Jonathan Ruvalcaba | 3 m springboard | 399.00 | 13 Q | 409.45 | 13 | Did not advance | |
| Frandiel Gómez; Jonathan Ruvalcaba | Synchronized 3 m springboard | 335.31 | 16 | — | | Did not advance | |

== Swimming ==
Dominican Republic entered 4 swimmers.

Men

| Athlete | Event | Heat | | Semifinal | | Final | |
| Athlete | Event | Time | Rank | Time | Rank | Time | Rank |
|---|---|---|---|---|---|---|---|
| Mauricio Arias | 200 metre freestyle | 1:55.90 | 56 | Did not advance | | | |
| Mauricio Arias | 400 metre freestyle | 4:11.15 | 49 | — | | Did not advance | |
| Andres Martijena | 50 metre breaststroke | 28.86 | 38 | Did not advance | | | |
| Andres Martijena | 100 metre breaststroke | 1:03.80 | 50 | Did not advance | | | |

Women

| Athlete | Event | Heat | | Semifinal | | Final | |
| Athlete | Event | Time | Rank | Time | Rank | Time | Rank |
|---|---|---|---|---|---|---|---|
| Elizabeth Jiménez | 100 metre backstroke | 1:03.45 | 41 | Did not advance | | | |
| Elizabeth Jiménez | 200 metre backstroke | 2:19.84 | 33 | Did not advance | | | |
| Mariel Mencia | 50 metre freestyle | 26.96 | 54 | Did not advance | | | |
| Mariel Mencia | 100 metre freestyle | 1:00.13 | 47 | Did not advance | | | |
