= Dominican Republic at the 2017 World Aquatics Championships =

- Flag of the Dominican Republic
- FINA code: DOM
- National federation: Federación Dominicana de Natación
- Website: www.fedona.org

in Budapest, Hungary
- Competitors: 5 in 2 sports
- Medals: Gold 0 Silver 0 Bronze 0 Total 0

World Aquatics Championships appearances
- 1973; 1975; 1978; 1982; 1986; 1991; 1994; 1998; 2001; 2003; 2005; 2007; 2009; 2011; 2013; 2015; 2017; 2019; 2022; 2023; 2024

Dominican Republic is scheduled to compete at the 2017 World Aquatics Championships in Budapest, Hungary from 14 July to 30 July.

== Diving ==
Dominican Republic has entered 1 diver (one male).

Athlete	Event	Preliminaries		Semifinals		Final	
Athlete	Event	Points	Rank	Points	Rank	Points	Rank
Frandiel Gómez	Men's 1 m springboard	287.35	39	—		did not advance	
Frandiel Gómez	Men's 10 m platform	282.10	40	did not advance			

== Swimming ==
Dominican Republic has received a Universality invitation from FINA to send a maximum of four swimmers (two men and two women) to the World Championships.

Athlete	Event	Heat		Semifinal		Final	
Athlete	Event	Time	Rank	Time	Rank	Time	Rank
Marc Rojas	Men's 50 m breaststroke	29.84	52	did not advance			
Marc Rojas	Men's 100 m breaststroke	1:03.65	52	did not advance			
Sperandio Sánchez	Men's 100 m freestyle	51.15	60	did not advance			
Sperandio Sánchez	Men's 100 m butterfly	54.98	54	did not advance			
Vanessa Rivas	Women's 50 m breaststroke	34.40	36	did not advance			
Vanessa Rivas	Women's 100 m breaststroke	1:14.14	40	did not advance			
Arianna Sanna	Women's 100 m freestyle	59.03	49	did not advance			
Arianna Sanna	Women's 200 m freestyle	2:08.45	41	did not advance			
