= Mariel Mencia =

Dominican Republic swimmer (born 2001)

Personal information
- Born: 13 February 2001 (age 25)

Sport
- Sport: Swimming

Mariel Mencia (born 13 February 2001) is a Dominican Republic swimmer.

In 2019, she represented Dominican Republic at the 2019 World Aquatics Championships held in Gwangju, South Korea. She competed in the women's 50 metre freestyle and women's 100 metre freestyle events. In both events she did not advance to compete in the semi-finals.
