= Dominican Republic at the 2024 World Aquatics Championships =

- Flag of the Dominican Republic
- FINA code: DOM
- National federation: Federación Dominicana de Natación
- Website: www.fedona.org

in Doha, Qatar
- Competitors: 11 in 3 sports
- Medals: Gold 0 Silver 0 Bronze 0 Total 0

World Aquatics Championships appearances
- 1973; 1975; 1978; 1982; 1986; 1991; 1994; 1998; 2001; 2003; 2005; 2007; 2009; 2011; 2013; 2015; 2017; 2019; 2022; 2023; 2024

Dominican Republic competed at the 2024 World Aquatics Championships in Doha, Qatar from 2 to 18 February.

== Competitors ==
The following is the list of competitors in the Championships.

Sport	Men	Women	Total
Diving	3	1	4
Open water swimming	2	1	3
Swimming	2	2	4
Total	7	4	11

== Diving ==
Men

Athlete	Event	Preliminaries		Semifinals		Final	
Athlete	Event	Points	Rank	Points	Rank	Points	Rank
José Calderón	1 m springboard	188.55	41	—		Did not advance	
Frandiel Gómez	1 m springboard	263.70	29	—		Did not advance	
Frandiel Gómez	3 m springboard	356.85	22	Did not advance			
Jonathan Ruvalcaba	3 m springboard	387.15	9 Q	371.75	13	Did not advance	
Frandiel Gómez; Jonathan Ruvalcaba	3 m synchro springboard	—				342.63	11

Women

Athlete	Event	Preliminaries		Semifinals		Final	
Athlete	Event	Points	Rank	Points	Rank	Points	Rank
Victoria Garza	1 m springboard	183.15	34	—		Did not advance	
Victoria Garza	3 m springboard	185.00	48	Did not advance			
Victoria Garza	10 m platform	253.90	22	Did not advance			

Mixed

Athlete	Event	Preliminaries		Semifinals		Final	
Athlete	Event	Points	Rank	Points	Rank	Points	Rank
José Calderón; Victoria Garza	3 m synchro springboard	—				198.12	15

== Open water swimming ==
Men

Athlete	Event	Time	Rank
Rayven de los Santos	Men's 5 km	1:00:52.7	69
Rayven de los Santos	Men's 10 km	2:12:53.9	75
Juan Nuñez	Men's 5 km	57:39.7	61
Juan Nuñez	Men's 10 km	2:13:40.5	76

Women

Athlete	Event	Time	Rank
Isabella Hernández	Men's 5 km	1:07:56.8	53
Isabella Hernández	Men's 10 km	2:21:38.7	65

== Swimming ==
Dominican Republic entered 4 swimmers.

Men

Athlete	Event	Heat		Semifinal		Final	
Athlete	Event	Time	Rank	Time	Rank	Time	Rank
Javier Núñez	50 metre freestyle	22.95	39	Did not advance			
Javier Núñez	100 metre freestyle	50.54	38	Did not advance			
Anthony Piñeiro	200 metre freestyle	1:55.85	53	Did not advance			
Anthony Piñeiro	100 metre backstroke	57.41	39	Did not advance			

Women

Athlete	Event	Heat		Semifinal		Final	
Athlete	Event	Time	Rank	Time	Rank	Time	Rank
María Alejandra Fernández	100 metre freestyle	1:01.03	48	Did not advance			
María Alejandra Fernández	100 metre butterfly	1:05.08	36	Did not advance			
Alejandra Santana	50 metre freestyle	27.60	61	Did not advance			
Alejandra Santana	100 metre backstroke	1:09.27	48	Did not advance			

Mixed

Athlete	Event	Heat		Final	
Athlete	Event	Time	Rank	Time	Rank
María Alejandra Fernández; Javier Núñez; Anthony Piñeiro; Alejandra Santana	4 × 100 m freestyle relay	3:48.17	14	Did not advance	
María Alejandra Fernández; Javier Núñez; Anthony Piñeiro; Alejandra Santana	4 × 100 m medley relay	4:14.44	28	Did not advance	
