= Dominican Republic at the 2019 World Aquatics Championships =

- Flag of the Dominican Republic
- FINA code: DOM
- National federation: Federación Dominicana de Natación
- Website: www.fedona.org

in Gwangju, South Korea
- Competitors: 6 in 2 sports
- Medals: Gold 0 Silver 0 Bronze 0 Total 0

World Aquatics Championships appearances
- 1973; 1975; 1978; 1982; 1986; 1991; 1994; 1998; 2001; 2003; 2005; 2007; 2009; 2011; 2013; 2015; 2017; 2019; 2022; 2023; 2024

Dominican Republic competed at the 2019 World Aquatics Championships in Gwangju, South Korea from 12 to 28 July.

== Diving ==
Dominican Republic entered two divers.

Men

Athlete	Event	Preliminaries		Final	
Athlete	Event	Points	Rank	Points	Rank
Frandiel Gómez	1 m springboard	258.90	38	did not advance	
Frandiel Gómez	10 m platform	220.45	47	did not advance	
José Ruvalcaba	10 m platform	341.20	25	did not advance	
Frandiel Gómez; José Ruvalcaba	3 m synchronized springboard	335.25	15	did not advance	
Frandiel Gómez; José Ruvalcaba	10 m synchronized platform	330.99	15	did not advance	

== Swimming ==
Dominican Republic has entered four swimmers.

Men

Athlete	Event	Heat		Semifinal		Final	
Athlete	Event	Time	Rank	Time	Rank	Time	Rank
Josue Dominguez Ramos	50 m breaststroke	28.50	45	did not advance			
Josue Dominguez Ramos	200 m breaststroke	2:23.21	49	did not advance			
Fausto Huerta	100 m breaststroke	1:04.65	63	did not advance			
Fausto Huerta	200 m individual medley	2:13.64	50	did not advance			

Women

Athlete	Event	Heat		Semifinal		Final	
Athlete	Event	Time	Rank	Time	Rank	Time	Rank
Krystal Lara	100 m backstroke	1:02.71	36	did not advance			
Krystal Lara	100 m butterfly	1:00.79	34	did not advance			
Mariel Mencia	50 m freestyle	26.81	=45	did not advance			
Mariel Mencia	100 m freestyle	58.82	49	did not advance			
