= Dominican Republic at the 2022 World Aquatics Championships =

- Flag of the Dominican Republic
- FINA code: DOM
- National federation: Federación Dominicana de Natación
- Website: www.fedona.org

in Budapest, Hungary
- Competitors: 4 in 2 sports
- Medals: Gold 0 Silver 0 Bronze 0 Total 0

World Aquatics Championships appearances
- 1973; 1975; 1978; 1982; 1986; 1991; 1994; 1998; 2001; 2003; 2005; 2007; 2009; 2011; 2013; 2015; 2017; 2019; 2022; 2023; 2024

Dominican Republic competed at the 2022 World Aquatics Championships in Budapest, Hungary from 17 June to 3 July.

== Diving ==
Dominican Republic entered two divers.

Men

| Athlete | Event | Preliminaries | | Final | |
| Athlete | Event | Points | Rank | Points | Rank |
|---|---|---|---|---|---|
| Frandiel Gómez | 1 m springboard | 322.10 | 25 | did not advance | |
| Frandiel Gómez | 3 m springboard | 351.75 | 26 | did not advance | |
| José Ruvalcaba | 1 m springboard | 359.35 | 10 Q | 346.15 | 9 |
| José Ruvalcaba | 3 m springboard | 358.45 | 24 | did not advance | |
| Frandiel Gómez; José Ruvalcaba | 3 m synchronized springboard | 327.63 | 13 | did not advance | |

== Swimming ==
Dominican Republic has entered two swimmers.

Men

| Athlete | Event | Heat | | Semifinal | | Final | |
| Athlete | Event | Time | Rank | Time | Rank | Time | Rank |
|---|---|---|---|---|---|---|---|
| Andrés Martijena | 50 m breaststroke | 28.78 | 36 | did not advance | | | |
| Andrés Martijena | 100 m breaststroke | 1:04.24 | 47 | did not advance | | | |

Women

| Athlete | Event | Heat | | Semifinal | | Final | |
| Athlete | Event | Time | Rank | Time | Rank | Time | Rank |
|---|---|---|---|---|---|---|---|
| Elizabeth Jiménez | 100 m backstroke | 1:04.15 | 31 | did not advance | | | |
| Elizabeth Jiménez | 200 m medley | 2:26.64 | 35 | did not advance | | | |
