= Santiago Cavanagh =

Bolivian swimmer

Personal information
- Born: 2 August 1985 (age 40)

Sport
- Sport: Swimming

Santiago Cavanagh (born 2 August 1985) is a Bolivian swimmer. He competed in the men's 50 metre breaststroke event at the 2017 World Aquatics Championships. In 2019, he represented Bolivia at the 2019 World Aquatics Championships held in Gwangju, South Korea and he competed in the men's 50 metre breaststroke and men's 100 metre breaststroke events.
