= Coat of arms of Bolivia =

- Armiger: Plurinational State of Bolivia
- Adopted: 2004
- Crest: Andean condor
- Supporters: Flags of Bolivia

The coat of arms of Bolivia has a central cartouche surrounded by Bolivian flags, cannons, laurel branches, and has an Andean condor on top.

== Official description ==
Bolivian law describes the coat of arms as follows:

The coat of arms of the Republic of Bolivia is elliptical in shape. In the upper part is a rising sun appearing behind the Cerro Rico with skies at dawn. In the center, the Cerro Rico of Potosí and the Cerro Menor. On the upper part of the smaller hill, is the Chapel of the Sacred Heart of Jesus. In the lower left part of the landscape formed by the hills, a llama. To its right a sheaf of wheat and a palm. Around the shield, a blue oval with a golden inner edge. In the upper half of the oval, the inscription BOLIVIA is in golden capital letters. In the lower half of the oval, ten golden stars of five points. At each flank, three national flags, a cannon, two rifles, an axe to the right, and a liberty cap to the left. Surmounting the shield, an Andean condor in rising attitude. Behind the condor, two interlaced branches of laurel and olive. The laurel to the left and the olive to the right form a wreath. When relevant, the field outside the shield shall be pearl blue.

== Gallery ==
Historical Coat of arms

First coat of arms of Bolivia, formerly named the Republic of Bolívar in honor of Simón Bolívar.

Second Coat of arms of Bolivia, adopted in 1826.

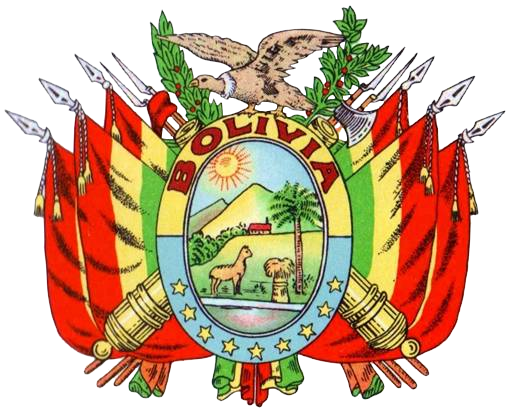
Third Coat of arms of Bolivia, adopted in 1888.

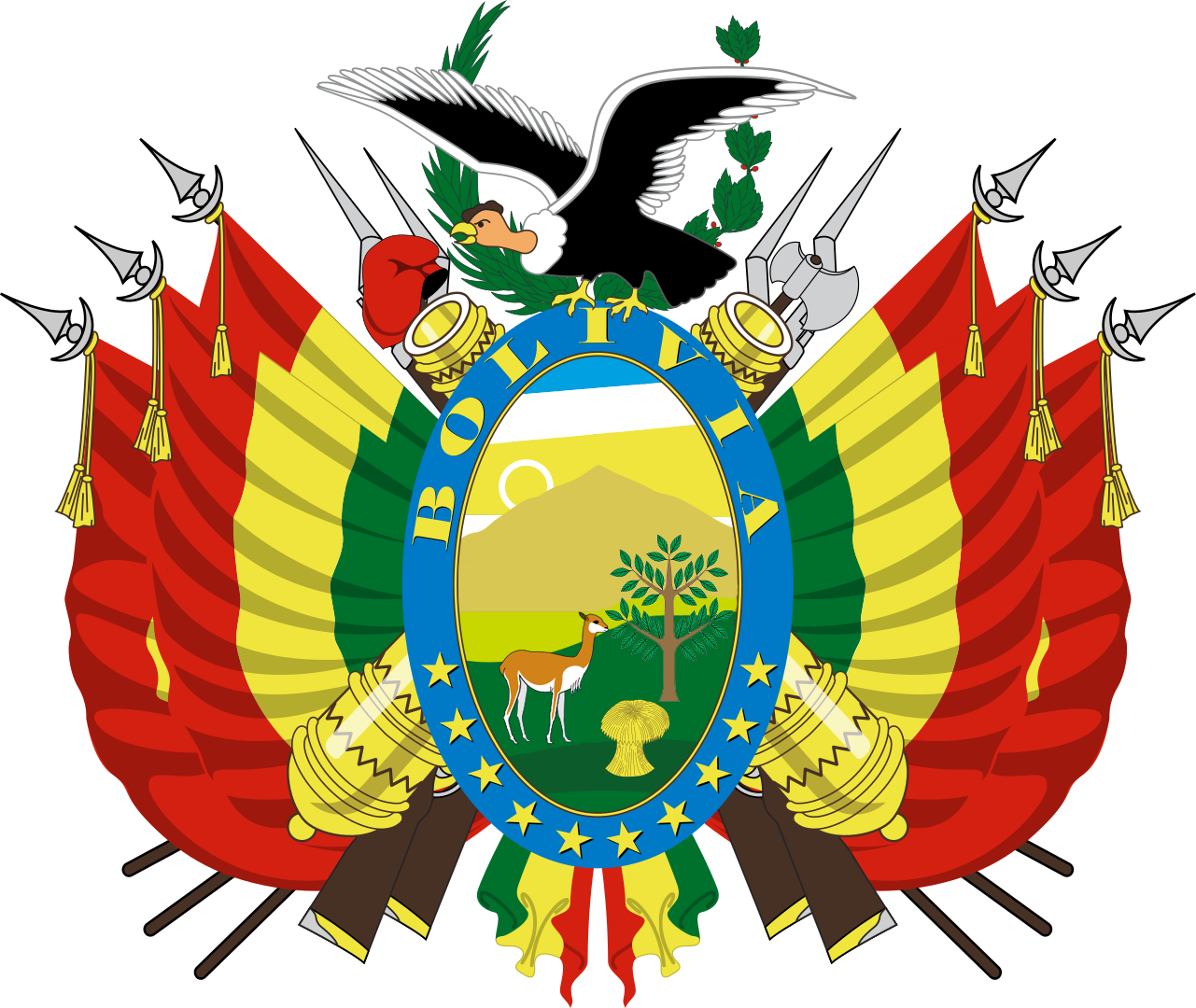
In 1961, the third Coat of Arms was modified to include a tenth star.

Fourth Coat of arms of Bolivia, adopted in 2004.
Gallery of images

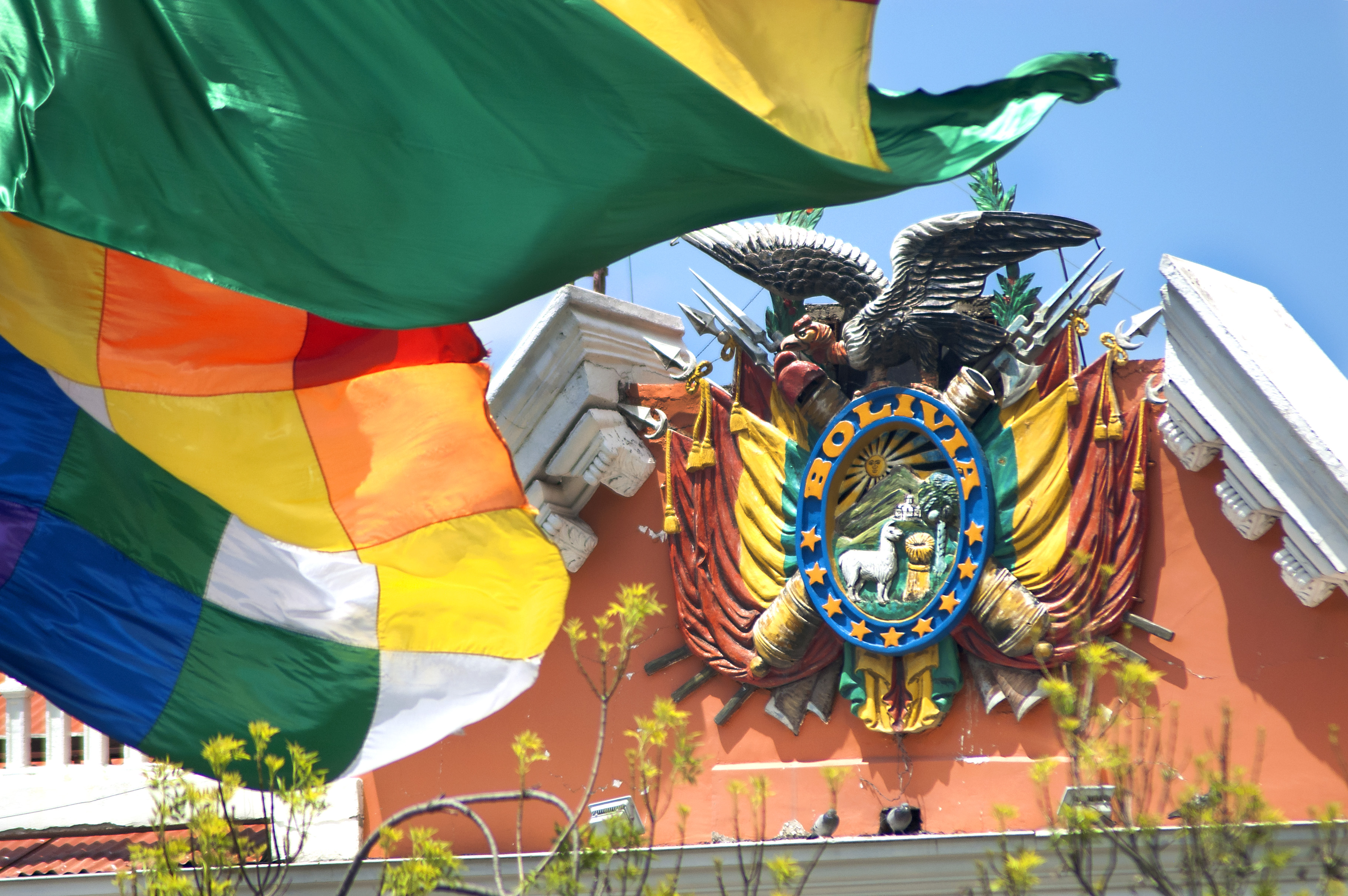
Coat of arms of Bolivia on top of the Government palace in the capital city of La Paz

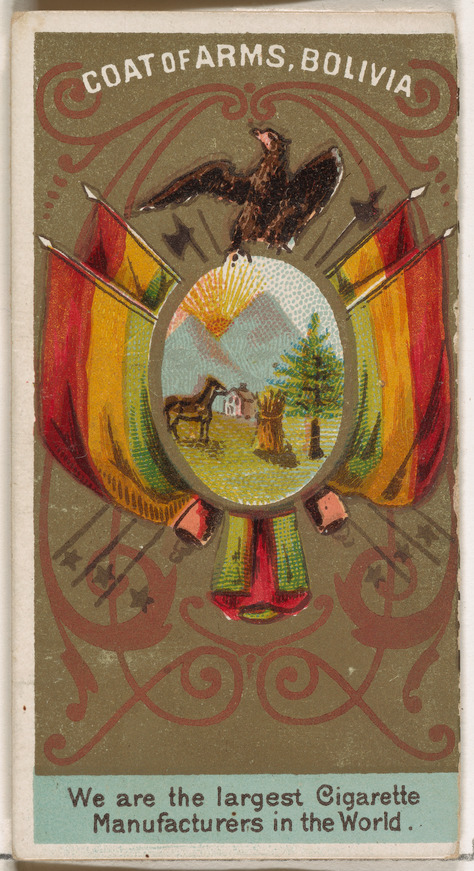
Coat of arms of Bolivia on an 1888 cigarette card, omitting the laurel branches and cap of liberty

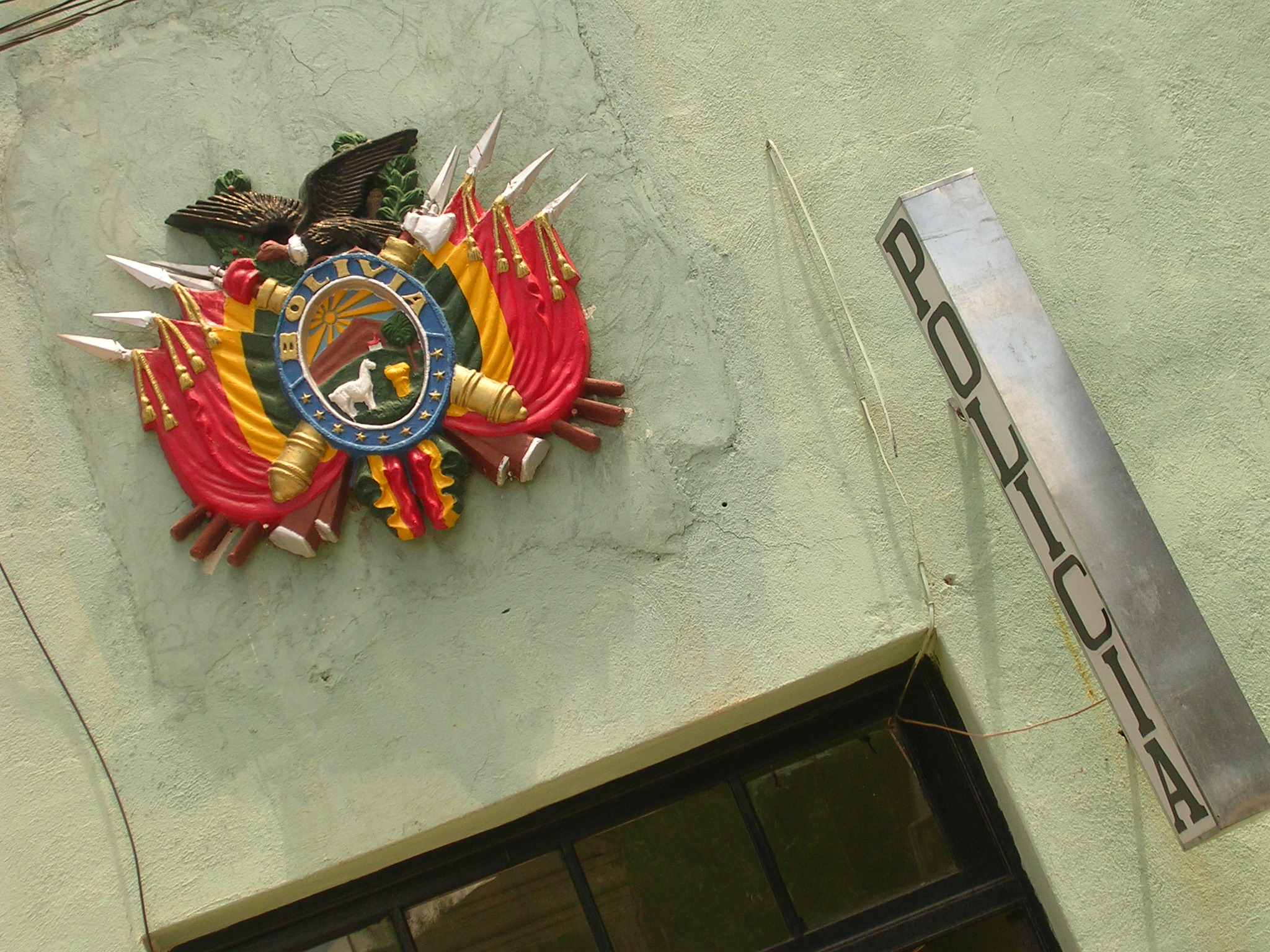
Coat of arms of Bolivia in a police station in the city of Tupiza.

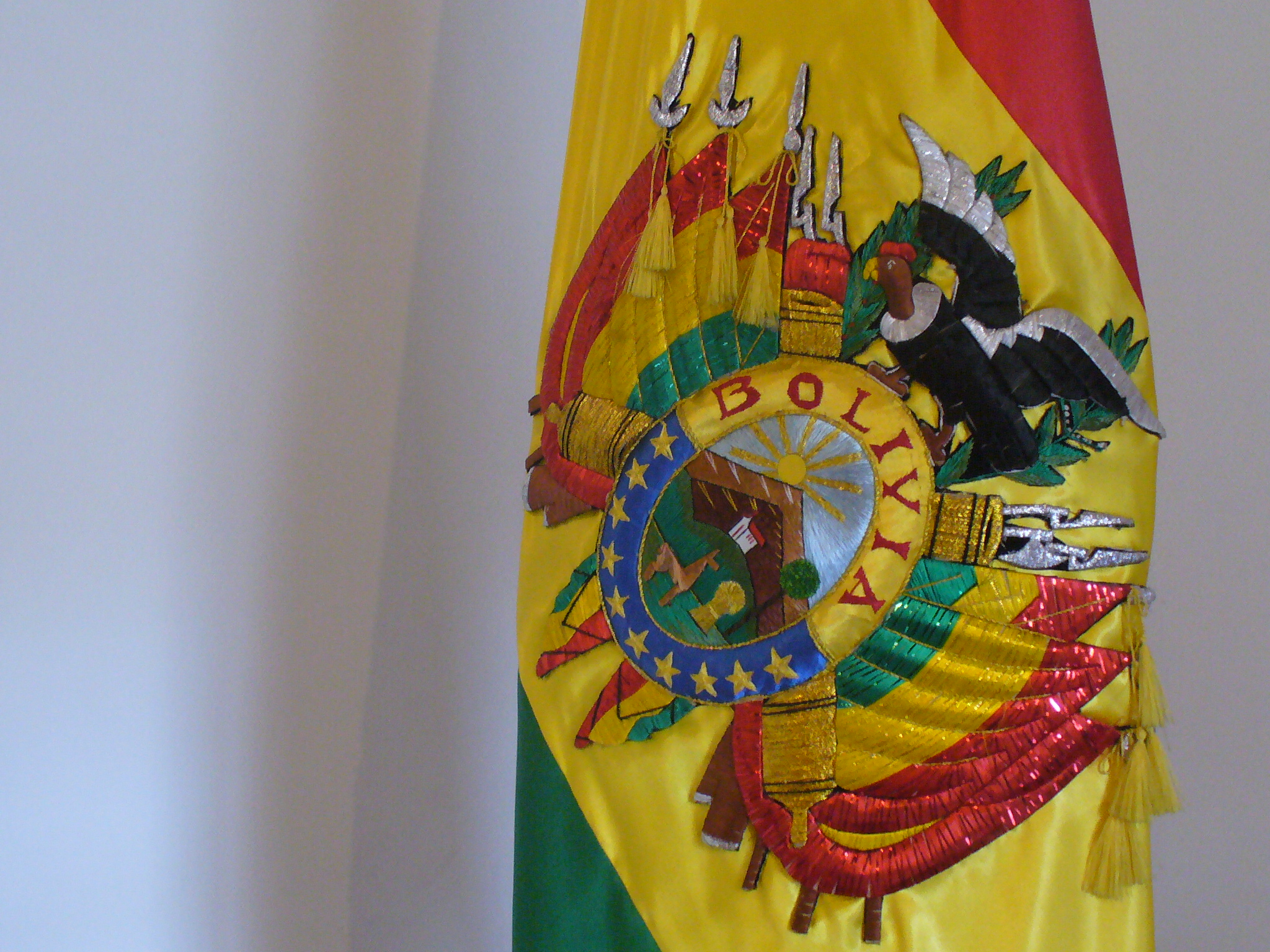
Coat of arms of Bolivia in the National Flag.

== See also ==
- Flag of Bolivia

== Sources ==
- FlagsoftheWorld.com: Bolivia
- Bolivian.com: Reformas y Deformaciones del Escudo de las Armas de la República de Bolivia (in Spanish)
