= Jhonny Pérez (swimmer) =

Dominican Republic swimmer (born 1997)

Jhonny Jose Perez Pena
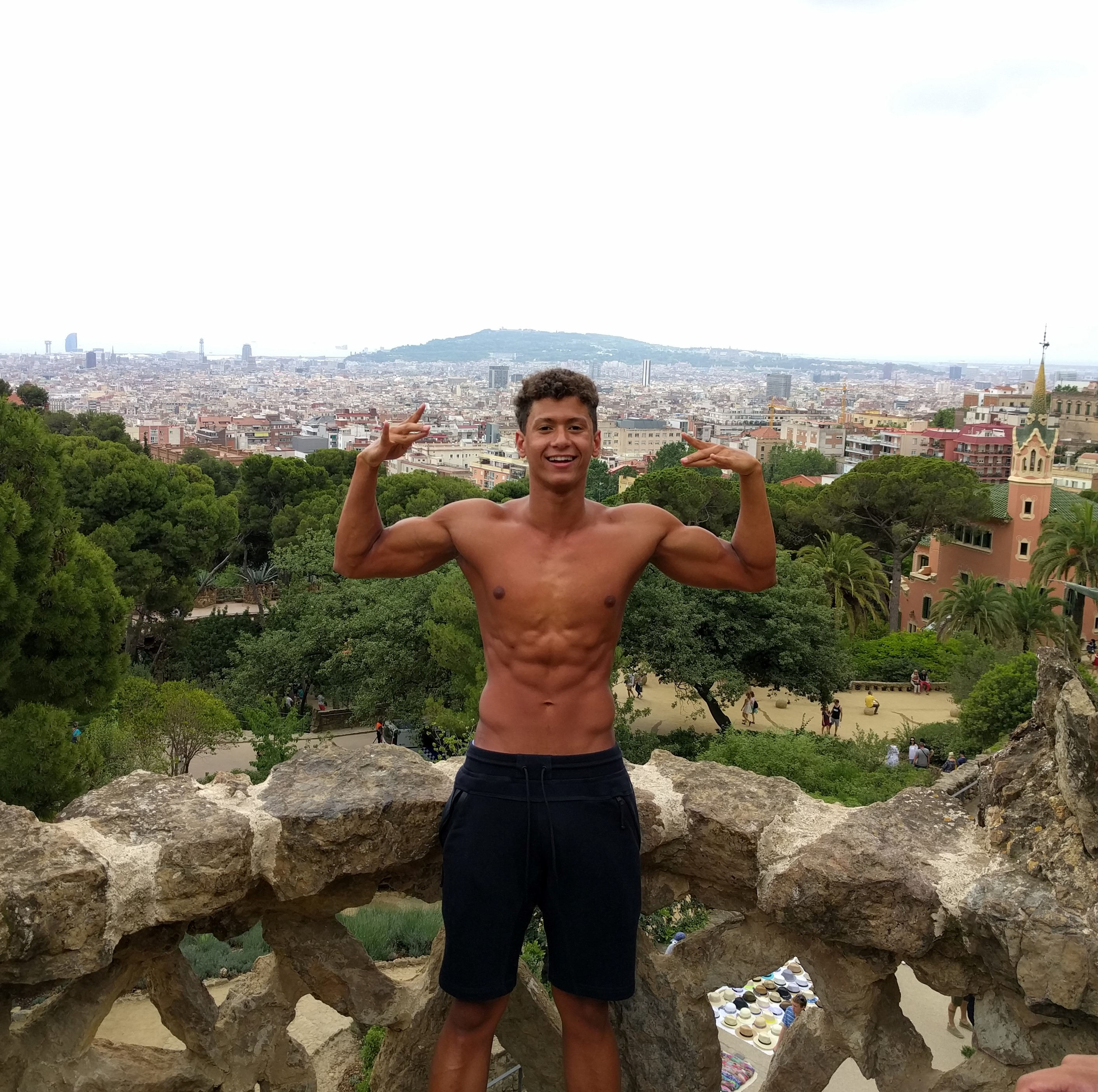

Personal information
- Full name: Jhonny Jose Perez Pena
- Nationality: Dominican
- Born: 16 September 1997 (age 28)
- Height: 1.81 m (5 ft 11 in)
- Weight: 160

Sport
- Country: Dominican Republic
- Sport: Swimming
- Event(s): 50M, 100M Freestyle, 50M Butterfly
- College team: Saint Peter's University
- Club: Azura Florida Aquatic
- Team: Dominican Republic

Achievements and titles
- Olympic finals: 2016 Rio
- World finals: 2015 Kazan, 2016 Windsor, 2018 Hangzhou

Jhonny Jose Pérez Pena (born 16 September 1997) is a Dominican competitive swimmer. He competed at the 2016 Summer Olympics in Rio de Janeiro, in the men's 100 metre freestyle. Also competed at the 2015 World Aquatics Championships, 2016 FINA World Swimming Championships (25 m), and 2018 FINA World Swimming Championships (25 m).
