= Arianna Sanna =

Dominican Republic swimmer (born 1998)

Personal information
- Born: 8 May 1998 (age 28)

Sport
- Sport: Swimming

Arianna Sanna (born 8 May 1998) is a Dominican Republic swimmer. She competed in the women's 200 metre freestyle event at the 2017 World Aquatics Championships.
