= Dorian McMenemy =

Dominican Republic swimmer (born 1996)

Personal information
- Nationality: Dominican Republic; United States
- Born: October 28, 1996 (age 30) United States
- Height: 6 ft 2 in (1.88 m)

Sport
- Sport: Swimming
- Strokes: Butterfly; Freestyle
- Club: Evolution Aquatic Club

Dorian McMenemy (born October 28, 1996) is a swimmer who competes for the Dominican Republic in the women's 100 meter butterfly. At the 2012 Summer Olympics she finished 41st overall in the heats in the Women's 100 metre butterfly. In 2016, Dorian competed in the 50 Freestyle in Rio de Janeiro.

McMenemy was born in the United States and lives with her mother, father, and three sisters in Northborough, Massachusetts, where she attended Algonquin Regional High School. Her mother, Luisa, is from the Dominican Republic and Dorian has dual citizenship with both countries. She was the only female swimmer on the Dominican team and was named the Dominican Female Athlete of the Year.

In 2015, she started attending Wagner College in Staten Island, New York on a full athletic scholarship.
