= Andrew Rutherfurd (swimmer) =

Bolivian swimmer (born 1988)

Personal information
- Full name: Andrew Mark Rutherfurd Aliaga
- Nationality: Bolivia
- Born: December 21, 1988 (age 37) California, Pennsylvania, U.S.
- Height: 1.78 m (5 ft 10 in)
- Weight: 80 kg (176 lb)

Sport
- Sport: Swimming
- Strokes: Freestyle

Andrew Mark Rutherfurd Aliaga (born December 21, 1988) is a Bolivian swimmer. At the 2012 Summer Olympics, he competed in the Men's 100 metre freestyle, finishing in 41st place overall in the heats, failing to qualify for the semifinals. Rutherfurd is a former member of the Church of Jesus Christ of Latter-day Saints.
