= José Alberto Quintanilla =

Bolivian swimmer (born 1997)

Jose Quintanilla
Personal information
- Full name: Jose Alberto Quintanilla Moreno
- Nationality: Bolivia
- Born: January 1, 1997 (age 29) Santa Cruz de la Sierra, Bolivia
- Height: 2.00 m (6 ft 7 in)
- Weight: 89 kg (196 lb)

Sport
- Sport: Swimming
- Strokes: Freestyle

José Alberto Quintanilla (born January 1, 1997) is an Olympic swimmer in the Men's 50 meters freestyle representing Bolivia. He competed in the 2016 Rio Olympics. José Quintanilla was a worldwide sensation when he cried of joy at the opening ceremony in the 2016 Olympics. He competed in the Men's 50 metre freestyle event where he ranked at #46 with a time of 23.35 seconds. He did not advance to the semifinals.

== See also ==
- Swimming at the 2016 Summer Olympics – Men's 50 metre freestyle
