= Flag of Bolivia =

Bolivia
- La Tricolor ('The Tricolor')
- Use: Civil flag and ensign
- Proportion: 15:22
- Adopted: 31 October 1851; 175 years ago
- Design: A horizontal tricolor of red, yellow and green
- Designed by: Manuel Isidoro Belzu
- Use: State flag and ensign, war flag
- Proportion: 15:22
- Adopted: 31 October 1851; 175 years ago
- Design: A horizontal tricolor of red, yellow and green with the coat of arms
- Designed by: Manuel Isidoro Belzu
- Use: Naval ensign
- Proportion: 5:7

The original national flag of the Plurinational State of Bolivia was created in 1851. The state and war flag is a horizontal tricolor of red, yellow and green with the Bolivian coat of arms in the center, whereas the civil flag is just the three colors without the coat of arms.

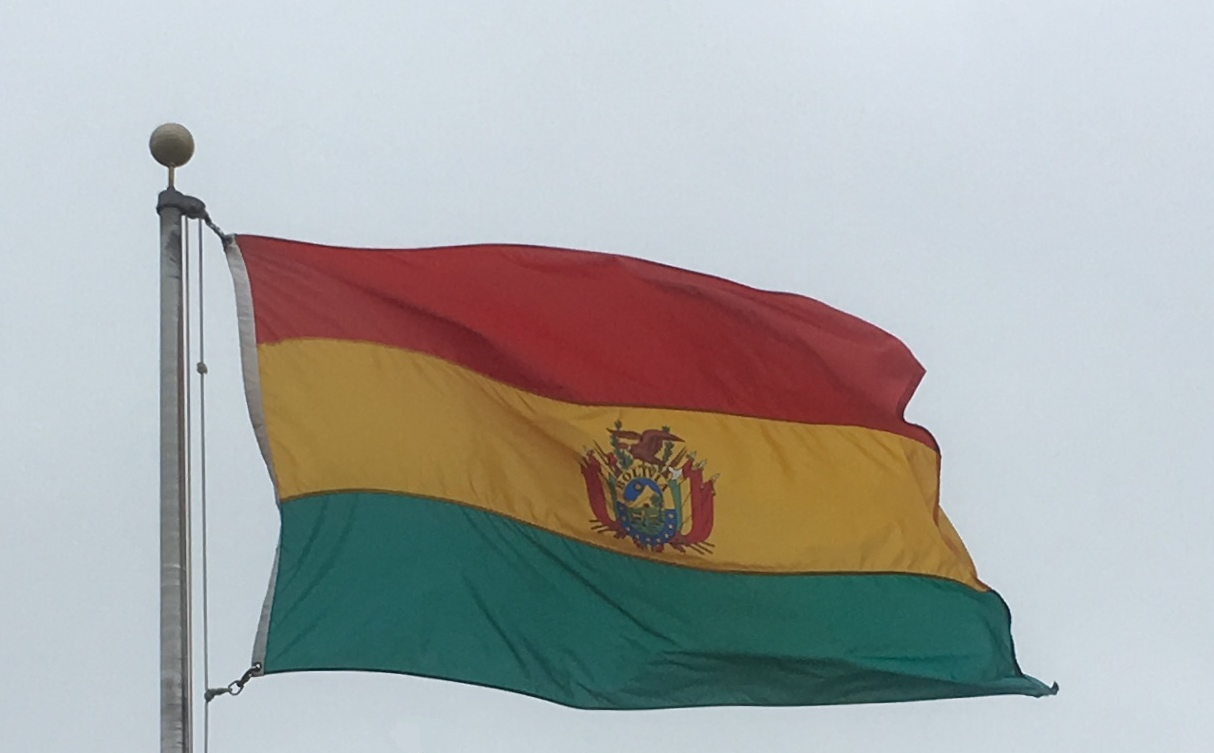
State Flag of Bolivia on flagpole

According to the revised Constitution of Bolivia of 2009, the Wiphala is considered to be a national symbol of Bolivia (along with the tricolor flag, national anthem, coat of arms, the cockade; and the kantuta and patujú flowers).

Despite its landlocked status, Bolivia has a naval ensign that is used by navy vessels on rivers and lakes. It consists of a blue field with the state flag in the canton bordered by nine small yellow five-pointed stars, with a larger yellow five-pointed star in the fly. The nine small stars represent the nine departments of Bolivia, and the larger star the nation's right to sea access (lost in 1884 during the War of the Pacific).

== Design and dimensions ==
The national flag of Bolivia is a horizontal tricolor of three equal bands: red at the top, yellow in the middle, and green at the bottom.

The flag's proportions went undefined from its 1851 adoption until Supreme Decree No. 27630 (2004) set them at 7.5 by 11 squares, a ratio of 15:22.

=== Color and symbolism ===
An 1888 Supreme Decree, under President Gregorio Pacheco, first described the colors:

- Red: "represents the blood shed by our heroes for the birth and preservation of the Republic"
- Yellow: "represents our wealth and resources."
- Green: "represents the richness of our natural areas as well as hope, a foundational value of our society"

The exact colors of the Bolivian flag were established by the Supreme Decree of 2004, and they are:

Color model	Red	Yellow	Green
Pantone	485	Process Yellow	356
RGB	218–41–28	244–228–0	0–122–51
RGB hex triplet	#DA291C	#F4E400	#007A33
CMYK	C0 M95 Y100 K0	C0 M0 Y100 K0	C91 M0 Y100 K26

Also, the Wiphala has been included into the national colors of the Bolivian Air Force such as on the executive Dassault Falcon 900EX. The Wiphala is also officially flown on governmental buildings such as the Palacio Quemado and parliament alongside the tricolor since the introduction of the revised 2009 constitution.

=== Co-official flag ===
The 2009 Constitution of Bolivia (Article 6, section II) established the southern Qullasuyu Wiphala as another national symbol of Bolivia, along with the tricolor. In official situations, the Wiphala must be flown to the left of the tricolor.

Wiphala

== Historical flags ==
The current Bolivian flag was officially adopted on 31 October 1851 during the presidency of Manuel Isidoro Belzu.

According to Supreme Decree No. 27630 of 19 July 2004, during the presidency of Carlos Mesa, it was established that the civil flag used in civic, public and patriotic celebrations would be used without the National Shield, while the flag used by the state in official acts would include the shield in its center.

During the presidency of Evo Morales, through Supreme Decree No. 241 of 5 August 2009, some symbolic modifications were made to the flag. It was also established that both the civil flag and the flag used by the state in official acts should be raised on the right side, with the wiphala on the left.

Colonial flag, Spanish Empire flag (1506–1825/1821 in Peru, and Bolivia), (1506–1785/1701 in other colonies), (1506–1821 in Philippines)

Bandera Menor, Civil flag (1825–1826)

Bandera Mayor, State flag (1825–1826)

Bandera Menor, Civil flag (1831–1851)

Bandera Mayor, State flag (1831–1851)

Peru-Bolivian Confederation (1836–1839)

Wiphala banner (used since 2009, Incan)

Former naval ensign of Bolivia (1966–2013)

Flag of the Armed Forces of Bolivia

== Pre-columbian precursors of the Bolivian flag ==
According to Javier Gonzalez Sfeir based on his research at the George Washington University Museum and Textile Museum, at least 300 years before the establishment of the Republic of Bolivia in 1825, the red-yellow-green tricolor was used as their identifying banner by both the Aymara and the Quechua (Inka) peoples who inhabited what is current-day Bolivia. He believes, therefore, that the flag of Bolivia is a product of cultural continuity in the southern Andes; however, he does admit that it might be the result of "convergent evolution" independently inspired by the colors of the rainbow.

== See also ==
- Coat of arms of Bolivia
- Flag of the Patujú flower
- Wiphala
- Flag of Rojava, similar flag to the pre-1851 flag
- Flag of Hungary, nearly identical design (white stripe instead of yellow)
- Flag of Ghana, nearly identical design (defaced with a black five-pointed star)
- Flag of Mali, a rotated version of the flag
- Flag of Guinea, a rotated version of the flag
- Flag of Ethiopia, an inverted version of the flag
