= Swimming at the 2024 World Aquatics Championships – Men's 400 metre freestyle =

Men's 400 metre freestyle at the 2024 World Aquatics Championships
- Venue: Aspire Dome
- Location: Doha, Qatar
- Dates: 11 February (heats and final)
- Competitors: 56 from 51 nations
- Winning time: 3:42.71

Medalists
gold medal	Kim Woo-min	South Korea
silver medal	Elijah Winnington	Australia
bronze medal	Lukas Märtens	Germany

The men's 400 metre freestyle competition at the 2024 World Aquatics Championships was held on 11 February 2024.

== Qualification ==
Each National Federation was permitted to enter a maximum of two qualified athletes in each individual event, but only if both of them had attained the "A" standard qualification time at approved qualifying events. For this event, the "A" standard qualification time was 3:48.15. Federations could enter one athlete into the event if they met the "B" standard qualification time. For this event, the "B" standard qualification time was 3:56.14. Athletes could also enter the event if they had met an "A" or "B" standard in a different event and their Federation had not entered anyone else. Additional considerations applied to Federations who had few swimmers enter through the standard qualification times. Federations in this category could at least enter two men and two women into the competition, all of whom could enter into up to two events.

== Records ==
Prior to the competition, the existing world and championship records were as follows.

World record	Paul Biedermann (GER)	3:40.07	Rome, Italy	26 July 2009
Competition record	Paul Biedermann (GER)	3:40.07	Rome, Italy	26 July 2009

== Results ==
=== Heats ===
The heats were started at 09:44.

Rank	Heat	Lane	Name	Nationality	Time	Notes
1	6	5	Elijah Winnington	Australia	3:44.37	Q
2	5	4	Lukas Märtens	Germany	3:44.77	Q
3	6	3	Kim Woo-min	South Korea	3:45.14	Q
4	6	2	Daniel Wiffen	Ireland	3:45.52	Q
5	5	3	Felix Auböck	Austria	3:45.53	Q
6	5	5	Guilherme Costa	Brazil	3:46.03	Q
7	5	0	Lucas Henveaux	Belgium	3:46.15	Q, NR
8	4	6	Victor Johansson	Sweden	3:46.20	Q, NR
9	4	5	David Aubry	France	3:46.40	
10	5	7	Zhang Zhanshuo	China	3:46.46	
11	5	8	Kristóf Rasovszky	Hungary	3:46.77	
12	6	1	David Johnston	United States	3:46.99	
13	6	8	Fei Liwei	China	3:47.06	
14	6	0	Matteo Ciampi	Italy	3:47.23	
15	6	6	Antonio Djakovic	Switzerland	3:47.81	
16	5	1	Sven Schwarz	Germany	3:47.82	
17	6	4	Ahmed Hafnaoui	Tunisia	3:48.05	
18	5	9	Alfonso Mestre	Venezuela	3:48.38	
19	3	5	Krzysztof Chmielewski	Poland	3:48.71	
20	6	7	Danas Rapšys	Lithuania	3:48.72	
21	4	9	Khiew Hoe Yean	Malaysia	3:49.14	
22	4	2	Kregor Zirk	Estonia	3:49.34	
23	5	6	Petar Mitsin	Bulgaria	3:49.43	
24	5	2	Marco De Tullio	Italy	3:49.44	
25	4	3	Ahmed Jaouadi	Tunisia	3:49.85	
26	4	1	Ilia Sibirtsev	Uzbekistan	3:50.09	NR
27	4	7	Jon Joentvedt	Norway	3:50.71	
28	4	8	Lorne Wigginton	Canada	3:50.91	
29	3	4	Carlos Quijada	Spain	3:52.86	
30	3	2	Glen Lim Jun Wei	Singapore	3:52.91	
31	4	4	Vlad Stancu	Romania	3:52.97	
32	3	1	Dylan Porges	Mexico	3:53.11	
33	3	6	Juan Morales	Colombia	3:54.22	
34	2	5	Samuel Kostal	Slovakia	3:54.78	
35	6	9	Logan Fontaine	France	3:55.60	
36	3	3	Emir Batur Albayrak	Turkey	3:56.34	
37	3	7	Sašo Boškan	Slovenia	3:56.38	
38	2	4	Loris Bianchi	San Marino	3:58.47	
39	3	9	Rafael Ponce	Peru	3:59.63	
40	4	0	Nguyễn Huy Hoàng	Vietnam	4:02.13	
41	2	3	Omar Abbass	Syria	4:03.21	
42	1	1	Matheo Mateos	Paraguay	4:04.14	
43	2	2	Nikola Ǵuretanoviḱ	North Macedonia	4:04.76	
44	2	0	Nasir Hussain	Nepal	4:05.65	NR
45	2	9	Ridhwan Mohamed	Kenya	4:06.44	NR
46	2	6	Alberto Vega	Costa Rica	4:06.89	
47	1	4	Xavier Ventura	El Salvador	4:07.35	
48	2	1	Mal Gashi	Kosovo	4:08.51	
49	2	8	Liggjas Joensen	Faroe Islands	4:08.59	
50	3	0	Tonnam Kanteemool	Thailand	4:09.41	
51	1	5	Khaled Alotaibi	Kuwait	4:14.64	
52	1	7	Mahmoud Abu Gharbieh	Palestine	4:15.85	
53	3	8	Ryan Barbe	Morocco	4:16.08	
54	1	6	Kaeden Gleason	U.S. Virgin Islands	4:17.52	
55	1	3	Mohammed Al-Zaki	Saudi Arabia	4:21.18	
56	1	2	Mohamed Shiham	Maldives	4:31.96	
	2	7	Gerald Hernández	Nicaragua	Did not start	

=== Final ===
The final was started at 19:02.

Rank	Lane	Name	Nationality	Time	Notes
1st place, gold medalist(s)	3	Kim Woo-min	South Korea	3:42.71	
2nd place, silver medalist(s)	4	Elijah Winnington	Australia	3:42.86	
3rd place, bronze medalist(s)	5	Lukas Märtens	Germany	3:42.96	
4	7	Guilherme Costa	Brazil	3:44.22	
5	1	Lucas Henveaux	Belgium	3:44.61	NR
6	8	Victor Johansson	Sweden	3:45.87	NR
7	6	Daniel Wiffen	Ireland	3:46.65	
8	2	Felix Auböck	Austria	3:51.60	

== Sources ==
- "Competition Regulations" (PDF). World Aquatics. Archived (PDF) from the original on 15 February 2026.
