= Diving at the 2024 World Aquatics Championships – Men's 1 metre springboard =

Men's 1 metre springboard at the 2024 World Aquatics Championships
- Venue: Hamad Aquatic Centre
- Location: Doha, Qatar
- Dates: 3 February (preliminary and final)
- Competitors: 45 from 32 nations
- Winning points: 431.75

Medalists
| gold medal | Osmar Olvera | Mexico |
| silver medal | Li Shixin | Australia |
| bronze medal | Ross Haslam | Great Britain |

The Men's 1 metre springboard competition at the 2024 World Aquatics Championships was held on 3 February 2024.

== Results ==
The preliminary round was started at 10:02. The final was started at 19:02.

Green denotes finalists

| Rank | Diver | Nationality | Preliminary | | Final | |
| Rank | Diver | Nationality | Points | Rank | Points | Rank |
|---|---|---|---|---|---|---|
| 1st place, gold medalist(s) | Osmar Olvera | Mexico | 406.30 | 1 | 431.75 | 1 |
| 2nd place, silver medalist(s) | Li Shixin | Australia | 379.95 | 3 | 395.70 | 2 |
| 3rd place, bronze medalist(s) | Ross Haslam | Great Britain | 373.90 | 5 | 393.10 | 3 |
| 4 | Giovanni Tocci | Italy | 385.05 | 2 | 388.75 | 4 |
| 5 | Lorenzo Marsaglia | Italy | 342.90 | 11 | 378.25 | 5 |
| 6 | Kurtis Mathews | Australia | 367.90 | 7 | 372.90 | 6 |
| 7 | Gwendal Bisch | France | 330.10 | 12 | 352.55 | 7 |
| 8 | Danylo Konovalov | Ukraine | 356.90 | 8 | 349.55 | 8 |
| 9 | Lyle Yost | United States | 354.30 | 9 | 347.25 | 9 |
| 10 | Sebastián Morales | Colombia | 350.70 | 10 | 340.60 | 10 |
| 11 | Zheng Jiuyuan | China | 378.60 | 4 | 334.35 | 11 |
| 12 | Juan Celaya | Mexico | 373.70 | 6 | 324.15 | 12 |
| 13 | Lars Rüdiger | Germany | 328.55 | 13 | Did not advance | |
| 14 | Jules Bouyer | France | 321.35 | 14 | Did not advance | |
| 15 | Frank Rosales | Cuba | 317.40 | 15 | Did not advance | |
| 16 | Luis Moura | Brazil | 315.40 | 16 | Did not advance | |
| 17 | Kyrylo Azarov | Ukraine | 311.80 | 17 | Did not advance | |
| 18 | Mohamed Noaman | Egypt | 305.65 | 18 | Did not advance | |
| 19 | Yi Jae-gyeong | South Korea | 295.45 | 19 | Did not advance | |
| 20 | David Ekdahl | Sweden | 293.10 | 20 | Did not advance | |
| 21 | Mohamed Farouk | Egypt | 292.55 | 21 | Did not advance | |
| 22 | Dariush Lotfi | Austria | 292.30 | 22 | Did not advance | |
| 23 | Kai Kaneto | Japan | 290.55 | 23 | Did not advance | |
| 24 | David Ledinski | Croatia | 290.50 | 24 | Did not advance | |
| 25 | Donato Neglia | Chile | 289.65 | 25 | Did not advance | |
| 26 | Martynas Lisauskas | Lithuania | 276.70 | 26 | Did not advance | |
| 27 | Jack Ryan | United States | 270.10 | 27 | Did not advance | |
| 28 | Elias Petersen | Sweden | 265.30 | 28 | Did not advance | |
| 29 | Frandiel Gómez | Dominican Republic | 263.70 | 29 | Did not advance | |
| 30 | Vyacheslav Kachanov | Uzbekistan | 258.45 | 30 | Did not advance | |
| 31 | Hanis Jaya Surya | Malaysia | 258.00 | 31 | Did not advance | |
| 32 | Cédric Fofana | Canada | 255.55 | 32 | Did not advance | |
| 33 | Rafael Borges | Brazil | 248.80 | 33 | Did not advance | |
| 34 | Sebastian Konecki | Lithuania | 243.55 | 34 | Did not advance | |
| 35 | Kim Yeong-taek | South Korea | 242.90 | 35 | Did not advance | |
| 36 | Irakli Sakandelidze | Georgia | 223.35 | 36 | Did not advance | |
| 37 | Nikola Paraušić | Serbia | 210.55 | 37 | Did not advance | |
| 38 | Avvir Tham | Singapore | 198.05 | 38 | Did not advance | |
| 39 | Hemam London Singh | India | 197.05 | 39 | Did not advance | |
| 40 | Surajit Rajbanshi | India | 192.20 | 40 | Did not advance | |
| 41 | José Calderón | Dominican Republic | 188.55 | 41 | Did not advance | |
| 42 | Adityo Restu Putra | Indonesia | 185.15 | 42 | Did not advance | |
| 43 | Curtis Yuen | Hong Kong | 179.00 | 43 | Did not advance | |
| 44 | Dulanjan Fernando | Sri Lanka | 150.40 | 44 | Did not advance | |
| 45 | Anathi Shozi | South Africa | 128.45 | 45 | Did not advance | |
