= Swimming at the 2024 World Aquatics Championships – Men's 200 metre individual medley =

Men's 200 metre individual medley at the Swimming at the 2024 World Aquatics Championships
- Venue: Aspire Dome
- Location: Doha, Qatar
- Dates: 14 February (heats and semifinals); 15 February (final)
- Competitors: 40 from 35 nations
- Winning time: 1:56.64

Medalists
| gold medal | Finlay Knox | Canada |
| silver medal | Carson Foster | United States |
| bronze medal | Alberto Razzetti | Italy |

The Men's 200 metre individual medley competition at the 2024 World Aquatics Championships was held on 14 and 15 February 2024.

== Qualification ==
Each National Federation was permitted to enter a maximum of two qualified athletes in each individual event, but only if both of them had attained the "A" standard qualification time at approved qualifying events. For this event, the "A" standard qualification time was 1:59.53. Federations could enter one athlete into the event if they met the "B" standard qualification time. For this event, the "B" standard qualification time was 2:03.71. Athletes could also enter the event if they had met an "A" or "B" standard in a different event and their Federation had not entered anyone else. Additional considerations applied to Federations who had few swimmers enter through the standard qualification times. Federations in this category could at least enter two men and two women into the competition, all of whom could enter into up to two events.

== Records ==
Prior to the competition, the existing world and championship records were as follows.

| World record | Ryan Lochte (USA) | 1:54.00 | Shanghai, China | 28 July 2011 |
| Competition record | Ryan Lochte (USA) | 1:54.00 | Shanghai, China | 28 July 2011 |

== Results ==
=== Heats ===
The heats were started on 14 February at 10:16.

| Rank | Heat | Lane | Name | Nationality | Time | Notes |
|---|---|---|---|---|---|---|
| 1 | 3 | 3 | Jérémy Desplanches | Switzerland | 1:58.17 | Q |
| 2 | 3 | 5 | Daiya Seto | Japan | 1:58.26 | Q |
| 3 | 3 | 4 | Carson Foster | United States | 1:58.71 | Q |
| 4 | 3 | 6 | Riki Abe | Japan | 1:59.48 | Q |
| 4 | 5 | 3 | Finlay Knox | Canada | 1:59.48 | Q |
| 6 | 4 | 6 | Gabriel Lopes | Portugal | 1:59.80 | Q |
| 7 | 5 | 7 | Zhang Zhanshuo | China | 1:59.87 | Q |
| 8 | 5 | 4 | Duncan Scott | Great Britain | 1:59.91 | Q |
| 9 | 5 | 5 | Alberto Razzetti | Italy | 2:00.14 | Q |
| 10 | 4 | 3 | Matthew Sates | South Africa | 2:00.28 | Q |
| 11 | 5 | 6 | Lewis Clareburt | New Zealand | 2:00.37 | Q |
| 12 | 4 | 2 | Balázs Holló | Hungary | 2:00.40 | Q |
| 13 | 4 | 4 | Shaine Casas | United States | 2:00.46 | Q |
| 14 | 3 | 2 | Lorne Wigginton | Canada | 2:00.63 | Q |
| 15 | 5 | 1 | Jaouad Syoud | Algeria | 2:01.13 | Q |
| 16 | 3 | 7 | Kim Min-suk | South Korea | 2:01.52 | Q |
| 17 | 3 | 8 | Anže Ferš Eržen | Slovenia | 2:01.71 | |
| 18 | 3 | 9 | Robert-Andrei Badea | Romania | 2:01.78 | |
| 19 | 3 | 1 | Vadym Naumenko | Ukraine | 2:01.87 | |
| 20 | 4 | 5 | Hugo González | Spain | 2:02.10 | |
| 21 | 5 | 8 | Miroslav Knedla | Czech Republic | 2:02.44 | |
| 22 | 2 | 3 | Richard Nagy | Slovakia | 2:02.89 | |
| 23 | 2 | 5 | Munzer Kabbara | Lebanon | 2:03.31 | |
| 24 | 4 | 1 | Wang Hsing-hao | Chinese Taipei | 2:03.85 | |
| 25 | 2 | 4 | Daniil Pancerevas | Lithuania | 2:04.16 | |
| 26 | 4 | 8 | Erick Gordillo | Guatemala | 2:04.34 | |
| 27 | 4 | 0 | Trần Hưng Nguyên | Vietnam | 2:04.75 | |
| 28 | 2 | 2 | Jarod Arroyo | Puerto Rico | 2:04.83 | |
| 29 | 5 | 0 | Tomas Peribonio | Ecuador | 2:04.97 | |
| 30 | 2 | 7 | Tan Khai Xin | Malaysia | 2:05.08 | |
| 31 | 2 | 6 | Ronan Wantenaar | Namibia | 2:05.16 | |
| 32 | 5 | 9 | José Martínez | Mexico | 2:05.21 | |
| 33 | 3 | 0 | Patrick Groters | Aruba | 2:05.59 | |
| 34 | 2 | 8 | Simon Bachmann | Seychelles | 2:07.85 | |
| 35 | 1 | 4 | Filipe Gomes | Malawi | 2:12.53 | |
| 36 | 4 | 9 | Dulyawat Kaewsriyong | Thailand | 2:14.64 | |
| 37 | 2 | 0 | Caio Lobo | Mozambique | 2:15.55 | |
| | 4 | 7 | Andreas Vazaios | Greece | Did not start | |
| | 5 | 2 | Carles Coll | Spain | Did not start | |
| | 1 | 3 | Josh Kirlew | Jamaica | Disqualified | |
| | 1 | 5 | Isaiah Aleksenko | Northern Mariana Islands | Disqualified | |
| | 2 | 1 | Esteban Nuñez del Prado | Bolivia | Disqualified | |

=== Semifinals ===
The semifinals were started on 14 February at 20:29.

| Rank | Heat | Lane | Name | Nationality | Time | Notes |
|---|---|---|---|---|---|---|
| 1 | 2 | 5 | Carson Foster | United States | 1:57.13 | Q |
| 2 | 2 | 1 | Shaine Casas | United States | 1:57.62 | Q |
| 3 | 1 | 6 | Duncan Scott | Great Britain | 1:57.83 | Q |
| 4 | 1 | 4 | Daiya Seto | Japan | 1:57.85 | Q |
| 5 | 2 | 2 | Alberto Razzetti | Italy | 1:58.21 | Q |
| 6 | 2 | 3 | Finlay Knox | Canada | 1:58.50 | Q |
| 7 | 2 | 7 | Lewis Clareburt | New Zealand | 1:58.59 | Q |
| 8 | 2 | 6 | Zhang Zhanshuo | China | 1:58.98 | Q |
| 9 | 2 | 4 | Jérémy Desplanches | Switzerland | 1:59.08 | |
| 10 | 1 | 5 | Riki Abe | Japan | 1:59.60 | |
| 11 | 2 | 8 | Jaouad Syoud | Algeria | 2:00.11 | |
| 12 | 1 | 3 | Gabriel Lopes | Portugal | 2:00.27 | |
| 13 | 1 | 1 | Lorne Wigginton | Canada | 2:00.32 | |
| 14 | 1 | 7 | Balázs Holló | Hungary | 2:00.39 | |
| 15 | 1 | 8 | Kim Min-suk | South Korea | 2:00.75 | |
| 16 | 1 | 2 | Matthew Sates | South Africa | 2:01.21 | |

=== Final ===
The final was held on 15 February at 20:03.

| Rank | Lane | Name | Nationality | Time | Notes |
|---|---|---|---|---|---|
| 1st place, gold medalist(s) | 7 | Finlay Knox | Canada | 1:56.64 | NR |
| 2nd place, silver medalist(s) | 4 | Carson Foster | United States | 1:56.97 | |
| 3rd place, bronze medalist(s) | 2 | Alberto Razzetti | Italy | 1:57.42 | |
| 4 | 6 | Daiya Seto | Japan | 1:57.54 | |
| 5 | 5 | Shaine Casas | United States | 1:57.73 | |
| 6 | 3 | Duncan Scott | Great Britain | 1:57.75 | |
| 7 | 1 | Lewis Clareburt | New Zealand | 1:58.66 | |
| 8 | 8 | Zhang Zhanshuo | China | 1:59.17 | |

== Sources ==
- "Competition Regulations" (PDF). World Aquatics. Archived (PDF) from the original on 15 February 2026.
