= Diving at the 2024 World Aquatics Championships – Men's synchronized 3 metre springboard =

Men's synchronized 3 metre springboard at the 2024 World Aquatics Championships
- Venue: Hamad Aquatic Centre
- Location: Doha, Qatar
- Dates: 4 February
- Competitors: 54 from 27 nations
- Teams: 27
- Winning points: 442.41

Medalists
gold medal	Long Daoyi; Wang Zongyuan	China
silver medal	Lorenzo Marsaglia; Giovanni Tocci	Italy
bronze medal	Adrián Abadía; Nicolás García	Spain

The Men's synchronized 3 metre springboard competition at the 2024 World Aquatics Championships was held on 4 February 2024.

== Results ==
The final was started at 15:32.

Rank	Nation	Divers	Points
1st place, gold medalist(s)	China	Long Daoyi; Wang Zongyuan	442.41
2nd place, silver medalist(s)	Italy	Lorenzo Marsaglia; Giovanni Tocci	384.24
3rd place, bronze medalist(s)	Spain	Adrián Abadía; Nicolás García	383.28
4	Mexico	Rodrigo Diego; Osmar Olvera	383.19
5	Great Britain	Anthony Harding; Jack Laugher	376.26
6	Ukraine	Oleh Kolodiy; Danylo Konovalov	363.12
7	Poland	Kacper Lesiak; Andrzej Rzeszutek	362.04
8	South Korea	Yi Jae-gyeong; Kim Yeong-taek	351.21
9	United States	Andrew Capobianco; Quentin Henninger	351.18
10	Switzerland	Guillaume Dutoit; Jonathan Suckow	344.37
11	Dominican Republic	Frandiel Gómez; Jonathan Ruvalcaba	342.63
12	France	Jules Bouyer; Alexis Jandard	338.85
13	Jamaica	Yohan Eskrick-Parkinson; Yona Knight-Wisdom	337.17
14	Malaysia	Ooi Tze Liang; Muhammad Syafiq Puteh	333.57
15	Croatia	David Ledinski; Matej Neveščanin	333.48
16	Germany	Alexander Lube; Moritz Wesemann	328.62
17	Colombia	Daniel Restrepo; Luis Uribe	320.13
18	New Zealand	Liam Stone; Frazer Tavener	319.38
19	Brazil	Luis Moura; Rafael Borges	313.71
20	Australia	Sam Fricker; Kurtis Mathews	311.61
21	Uzbekistan	Vyacheslav Kachanov; Igor Myalin	310.62
22	Indonesia	Tri Anggoro Priambodo; Adityo Restu Putra	288.18
23	Austria	Alexander Hart; Nikolaj Schaller	275.91
24	Lithuania	Sebastian Konecki; Martynas Lisauskas	247.35
25	Kazakhstan	Nazar Kozhanov; Kirill Novikov	232.29
26	Hong Kong	Robben Yiu; Curtis Yuen	208.41
27	Macau	He Heung Wing; Zhang Hoi	202.53
