= Diving at the 2024 World Aquatics Championships – Men's 3 metre springboard =

Men's 3 metre springboard at the 2024 World Aquatics Championships
- Venue: Hamad Aquatic Centre
- Location: Doha, Qatar
- Dates: 6 February (preliminary); 7 February (semifinal and final)
- Competitors: 70 from 41 nations
- Winning points: 538.70

Medalists
gold medal	Wang Zongyuan	China
silver medal	Xie Siyi	China
bronze medal	Osmar Olvera	Mexico

The Men's 3 metre springboard competition at the 2024 World Aquatics Championships was held on 6 and 7 February 2024.

== Results ==
The preliminary round was started on 6 February at 10:02. The semifinal was started on 7 February at 10:02. The final was started on 7 February at 18:32.

Green denotes finalists

Blue denotes semifinalists

Rank	Diver	Nationality	Preliminary		Semifinal		Final	
Rank	Diver	Nationality	Points	Rank	Points	Rank	Points	Rank
1st place, gold medalist(s)	Wang Zongyuan	China	474.30	2	469.95	2	538.70	1
2nd place, silver medalist(s)	Xie Siyi	China	493.05	1	518.00	1	516.10	2
3rd place, bronze medalist(s)	Osmar Olvera	Mexico	445.55	3	458.35	3	498.40	3
4	Luis Uribe	Colombia	381.95	13	440.75	4	443.15	4
5	Jules Bouyer	France	404.25	7	422.55	6	439.50	5
6	Ross Haslam	Great Britain	429.05	4	427.00	5	438.60	6
7	Moritz Wesemann	Germany	412.45	5	392.50	10	433.75	7
8	Woo Ha-ram	South Korea	380.20	15	392.95	9	424.50	8
9	Sho Sakai	Japan	383.50	12	393.25	8	414.60	9
10	Li Shixin	Australia	389.55	8	398.20	7	406.40	10
11	Gwendal Bisch	France	371.75	18	387.30	11	380.80	11
12	Lorenzo Marsaglia	Italy	377.65	16	372.50	12	366.25	12
13	Jonathan Ruvalcaba	Dominican Republic	387.15	9	371.75	13	Did not advance	
14	Yona Knight-Wisdom	Jamaica	385.65	11	368.95	14	Did not advance	
15	Yi Jae-gyeong	South Korea	381.60	14	367.85	15	Did not advance	
16	Mohamed Farouk	Egypt	404.70	6	366.80	16	Did not advance	
17	Jake Passmore	Ireland	374.15	17	364.50	17	Did not advance	
18	Alexander Lube	Germany	387.05	10	335.45	18	Did not advance	
19	Haruki Suyama	Japan	371.40	19	Did not advance			
20	Jack Laugher	Great Britain	363.10	20	Did not advance			
21	Giovanni Tocci	Italy	359.00	21	Did not advance			
22	Frandiel Gómez	Dominican Republic	356.85	22	Did not advance			
23	Ooi Tze Liang	Malaysia	352.10	23	Did not advance			
24	Matej Nevešćanin	Croatia	351.75	24	Did not advance			
25	Adrián Abadía	Spain	348.20	25	Did not advance			
26	Liam Stone	New Zealand	344.30	26	Did not advance			
27	Emanuel Vázquez	Puerto Rico	343.80	27	Did not advance			
28	Nicolás García	Spain	342.75	28	Did not advance			
29	Tyler Downs	United States	342.35	29	Did not advance			
30	Nikolaj Schaller	Austria	341.55	30	Did not advance			
31	Rodrigo Diego	Mexico	340.40	31	Did not advance			
32	Frazer Tavener	New Zealand	338.55	32	Did not advance			
32	Kurtis Mathews	Australia	338.55	32	Did not advance			
34	Cédric Fofana	Canada	338.20	34	Did not advance			
35	Jonathan Suckow	Switzerland	332.45	35	Did not advance			
36	Carson Paul	Canada	330.80	36	Did not advance			
37	Grayson Campbell	United States	328.00	37	Did not advance			
38	Danylo Konovalov	Ukraine	325.90	38	Did not advance			
39	Mohamed Noaman	Egypt	325.50	39	Did not advance			
40	Isak Børslien	Norway	323.45	40	Did not advance			
41	Elias Petersen	Sweden	322.65	41	Did not advance			
42	Alexander Hart	Austria	321.85	42	Did not advance			
43	Andrzej Rzeszutek	Poland	312.35	43	Did not advance			
44	Kacper Lesiak	Poland	299.70	44	Did not advance			
45	Muhammad Syafiq Puteh	Malaysia	296.35	45	Did not advance			
46	Luis Moura	Brazil	294.95	46	Did not advance			
47	Kyrylo Azarov	Ukraine	294.25	47	Did not advance			
48	Rafael Max	Brazil	288.15	48	Did not advance			
49	Guillaume Dutoit	Switzerland	283.70	49	Did not advance			
50	Sebastian Konecki	Lithuania	283.35	50	Did not advance			
51	Adityo Restu Putra	Indonesia	279.95	51	Did not advance			
52	Vyacheslav Kachanov	Uzbekistan	279.55	52	Did not advance			
53	Chawanwat Juntaphadawon	Thailand	276.30	53	Did not advance			
54	Tornike Onikashvili	Georgia	274.75	54	Did not advance			
55	Sebastián Morales	Colombia	274.75	55	Did not advance			
56	Frank Rosales	Cuba	272.70	56	Did not advance			
57	Avvir Tham	Singapore	266.20	57	Did not advance			
58	David Ekdahl	Sweden	263.90	58	Did not advance			
59	Martynas Lisauskas	Lithuania	262.90	59	Did not advance			
60	David Ledinski	Croatia	252.65	60	Did not advance			
61	Yohan Eskrick-Parkinson	Jamaica	250.65	61	Did not advance			
62	Hemam London Singh	India	238.80	62	Did not advance			
63	Curtis Yuen	Hong Kong	237.30	63	Did not advance			
64	Surajit Rajbanshi	India	231.90	64	Did not advance			
65	Tri Anggoro Priambodo	Indonesia	207.30	65	Did not advance			
66	Nazar Kozhanov	Kazakhstan	202.25	66	Did not advance			
67	Nikola Paraušić	Serbia	197.40	67	Did not advance			
68	Dulanjan Fernando	Sri Lanka	180.25	68	Did not advance			
69	Robben Yiu	Hong Kong	161.25	69	Did not advance			
	Donato Neglia	Chile	Did not finish		Did not advance			
