= Swimming at the 2024 World Aquatics Championships – Men's 200 metre backstroke =

Men's 200 metre backstroke at the Swimming at the 2024 World Aquatics Championships
- Venue: Aspire Dome
- Location: Doha, Qatar
- Dates: 15 February (heats and semifinals); 16 February (final)
- Competitors: 33 from 32 nations
- Winning time: 1:55.30

Medalists
gold medal	Hugo González	Spain
silver medal	Roman Mityukov	Switzerland
bronze medal	Pieter Coetze	South Africa

The men's 200 metre backstroke competition at the 2024 World Aquatics Championships was held on 15 and 16 February 2024.

== Qualification ==
Each National Federation was permitted to enter a maximum of two qualified athletes in each individual event, but only if both of them had attained the "A" standard qualification time at approved qualifying events. For this event, the "A" standard qualification time was 1:58.07. Federations could enter one athlete into the event if they met the "B" standard qualification time. For this event, the "B" standard qualification time was 2:02.20. Athletes could also enter the event if they had met an "A" or "B" standard in a different event and their Federation had not entered anyone else. Additional considerations applied to Federations who had few swimmers enter through the standard qualification times. Federations in this category could at least enter two men and two women into the competition, all of whom could enter into up to two events.

== Records ==
Prior to the competition, the existing world and championship records were as follows.

World record	Aaron Peirsol (USA)	1:51.92	Rome, Italy	31 July 2009
Competition record	Aaron Peirsol (USA)	1:51.92	Rome, Italy	31 July 2009

== Results ==
=== Heats ===
The heats were started on 15 February at 09:56.

Rank	Heat	Lane	Name	Nationality	Time	Notes
1	2	3	Apostolos Siskos	Greece	1:56.64	Q, NR
2	4	7	Kai van Westering	Netherlands	1:57.29	Q
3	2	5	Pieter Coetze	South Africa	1:57.90	Q
4	4	4	Roman Mityukov	Switzerland	1:58.03	Q
5	2	2	Ádám Telegdy	Hungary	1:58.07	Q
6	3	3	Ksawery Masiuk	Poland	1:58.20	Q
7	4	6	Luke Greenbank	Great Britain	1:58.23	Q
8	3	4	Bradley Woodward	Australia	1:58.26	Q
9	3	5	Lee Ju-ho	South Korea	1:58.29	Q
10	2	7	Lukas Märtens	Germany	1:58.45	Q
11	4	5	Jack Aikins	United States	1:58.50	Q
12	3	6	Brodie Williams	Great Britain	1:58.72	Q
13	3	7	Osamu Kato	Japan	1:58.82	Q
14	4	3	Hugo González	Spain	1:59.00	Q
15	3	1	Raben Dommann	Canada	1:59.10	Q
16	4	1	John Shortt	Ireland	1:59.27	Q
17	2	1	Yeziel Morales	Puerto Rico	1:59.38	
18	4	8	Kaloyan Levterov	Bulgaria	1:59.42	
19	2	6	Lorenzo Mora	Italy	1:59.80	
20	3	0	Ziyad Ahmed	Sudan	2:00.53	
21	2	8	Erikas Grigaitis	Lithuania	2:01.32	
22	1	5	Yegor Popov	Kazakhstan	2:01.61	
23	2	4	Oleksandr Zheltyakov	Ukraine	2:01.81	
24	1	4	Denis-Laurean Popescu	Romania	2:02.05	
25	3	8	Primož Šenica	Slovenia	2:04.11	
26	4	9	Denilson Cyprianos	Zimbabwe	2:04.70	
27	2	9	Farrel Tangkas	Indonesia	2:05.49	
28	4	0	Patrick Groters	Aruba	2:06.10	
29	3	9	Diego Camacho Salgado	Mexico	2:07.00	
30	1	3	Alexis Kpade	Benin	2:07.25	
31	1	6	Ahmad Safie	Lebanon	2:08.37	
32	2	0	Trần Hưng Nguyên	Vietnam	2:08.71	
33	1	2	Zeke Chan	Brunei	2:12.94	
	3	2	Apostolos Christou	Greece	Did not start	
	4	2	Andrew Jeffcoat	New Zealand	Did not start	

=== Semifinals ===
The semifinals were held on 15 February at 20:33.

Rank	Heat	Lane	Name	Nationality	Time	Notes
1	2	7	Jack Aikins	United States	1:56.32	Q
2	1	1	Hugo González	Spain	1:56.38	Q
3	2	2	Lee Ju-ho	South Korea	1:56.40	Q
4	2	3	Ádám Telegdy	Hungary	1:56.65	Q
5	1	5	Roman Mityukov	Switzerland	1:56.72	Q
6	2	4	Apostolos Siskos	Greece	1:56.82	Q
7	1	4	Kai van Westering	Netherlands	1:56.91	Q
8	2	5	Pieter Coetze	South Africa	1:57.07	Q
9	2	6	Luke Greenbank	Great Britain	1:57.29	
10	1	3	Ksawery Masiuk	Poland	1:57.48	
11	1	6	Bradley Woodward	Australia	1:57.58	
12	1	7	Brodie Williams	Great Britain	1:58.23	
13	1	2	Lukas Märtens	Germany	1:58.24	
14	1	8	John Shortt	Ireland	1:58.47	NR
15	2	1	Osamu Kato	Japan	1:58.97	
16	2	8	Raben Dommann	Canada	2:00.75	

=== Final ===
The final was held on 16 February at 19:59.

Rank	Lane	Name	Nationality	Time	Notes
1st place, gold medalist(s)	5	Hugo González	Spain	1:55.30	
2nd place, silver medalist(s)	2	Roman Mityukov	Switzerland	1:55.40	
3rd place, bronze medalist(s)	8	Pieter Coetze	South Africa	1:55.99	
4	4	Jack Aikins	United States	1:56.21	
5	3	Lee Ju-ho	South Korea	1:56.38	
6	7	Apostolos Siskos	Greece	1:56.64	=NR
7	6	Ádám Telegdy	Hungary	1:56.66	
8	1	Kai van Westering	Netherlands	1:57.19	

== Sources ==
- "Competition Regulations" (PDF). World Aquatics. Archived (PDF) from the original on 15 February 2026.
