= South Korea at the 2024 World Aquatics Championships =

- Flag of South Korea
- FINA code: KOR
- National federation: Korea Swimming Federation

in Doha, Qatar
- Competitors: 37 in 5 sports
- Medals Ranked 8th: Gold 2 Silver 1 Bronze 2 Total 5

World Aquatics Championships appearances
- 1973; 1975; 1978; 1982; 1986; 1991; 1994; 1998; 2001; 2003; 2005; 2007; 2009; 2011; 2013; 2015; 2017; 2019; 2022; 2023; 2024

South Korea competed at the 2024 World Aquatics Championships in Doha, Qatar from 2 to 18 February.

== Medalists ==
Medal	Name	Sport	Event	Date
1st place, gold medalist(s)	Kim Woo-min	Swimming	Men's 400 metre freestyle	11 February 2024
1st place, gold medalist(s)	Hwang Sun-woo	Swimming	Men's 200 metre freestyle	13 February 2024
2nd place, silver medalist(s)	Yang Jae-hoon; Kim Woo-min; Lee Ho-joon; Hwang Sun-woo; Lee Yoo-yeon	Swimming	Men's 4 × 200 metre freestyle relay	16 February 2024
3rd place, bronze medalist(s)	Kim Su-ji	Diving	Women's 3 metre springboard	9 February 2024
3rd place, bronze medalist(s)	Yi Jae-gyeong; Kim Su-ji	Diving	Mixed synchronized 3 metre springboard	10 February 2024

== Competitors ==
The following is the list of competitors in the Championships.

Sport	Men	Women	Total
Artistic swimming	0	2	2
Diving	4	4	8
High diving	1	0	1
Open water swimming	2	2	4
Swimming	14	8	22
Total	21	16	37

== Artistic swimming ==
Women

Athlete	Event	Preliminaries		Final	
Athlete	Event	Points	Rank	Points	Rank
Hur Yoon-seo; Lee Ri-young	Duet technical routine	232.7351	9 Q	204.5667	10
Hur Yoon-seo; Lee Ri-young	Duet free routine	215.2875	10 Q	213.5979	10

== Diving ==
Men

Athlete	Event	Preliminaries		Semifinals		Final	
Athlete	Event	Points	Rank	Points	Rank	Points	Rank
Kim Yeong-taek	1 m springboard	242.90	35	—		Did not advance	
Kim Yeong-taek	10 m platform	Did not start		Did not advance			
Shin Jung-whi	10 m platform	379.85	12 Q	302.55	18	Did not advance	
Woo Ha-ram	3 m springboard	380.20	15 Q	392.95	9 Q	424.50	8
Yi Jae-gyeong	1 m springboard	295.45	19	—		Did not advance	
Yi Jae-gyeong	3 m springboard	381.60	14 Q	367.85	15	Did not advance	
Yi Jae-gyeong; Kim Yeong-taek	3 m synchro springboard	—				351.21	8
Kim Yeong-taek; Shin Jung-whi	10 m synchro platform	—				344.70	11

Women

Athlete	Event	Preliminaries		Semifinals		Final	
Athlete	Event	Points	Rank	Points	Rank	Points	Rank
Cho Eun-bi	10 m platform	230.25	30	Did not advance			
Kim Su-ji	1 m springboard	243.85	2 Q	—		248.60	8
Kim Su-ji	3 m springboard	257.55	15 Q	302.10	3 Q	311.25	3rd place, bronze medalist(s)
Kim Na-hyun	1 m springboard	212.05	23	—		Did not advance	
Kim Na-hyun	10 m platform	275.45	16 Q	250.95	16	Did not advance	
Kwon Ha-lim	3 m springboard	204.95	43	Did not advance			
Kim Su-ji; Kwon Ha-lim	3 m synchro springboard	—				257.10	10
Kim Na-hyun; Kwon Ha-lim	10 m synchro platform	—				240.36	11

Mixed

Athlete	Event	Final	
Athlete	Event	Points	Rank
Yi Jae-gyeong; Kim Su-ji	3 m synchro springboard	285.03	3rd place, bronze medalist(s)
Shin Jung-whi; Kim Na-hyun	10 m synchro platform	262.80	6

== High diving ==
Athlete	Event	Points	Rank
Choi Byung-hwa	Men's high diving	217.30	23

== Open water swimming ==
Men

Athlete	Event	Time	Rank
Oh Se-beom	Men's 5 km	55:07.7	38
Oh Se-beom	Men's 10 km	1:54:34.5	56
Park Jae-hun	Men's 5 km	53:45.9	27
Park Jae-hun	Men's 10 km	1:54:33.9	54

Women

Athlete	Event	Time	Rank
Lee Hae-rim	Women's 5 km	59:16.9	34
Lee Hae-rim	Women's 10 km	2:06:14.6	42
Park Jung-ju	Women's 5 km	1:01:18.0	39
Park Jung-ju	Women's 10 km	2:12:15.2	53

Mixed

Athlete	Event	Time	Rank
Lee Hae-rim; Oh Se-beom; Park Jae-hun; Park Jung-ju	Team relay	1:07:55.3	13

== Swimming ==
South Korea entered 22 swimmers.

Men

Athlete	Event	Heat		Semifinal		Final	
Athlete	Event	Time	Rank	Time	Rank	Time	Rank
Baek In-chul	50 metre butterfly	23.34	8 Q	23.24	8 Q	23.35	7
Choi Dong-yeol	50 metre breaststroke	Disqualified		Did not advance			
Choi Dong-yeol	100 metre breaststroke	1:00.15	14 Q	59.74	11	Did not advance	
Hwang Sun-woo	100 metre freestyle	48.15	6 Q	47.93	3 Q	47.93	5
Hwang Sun-woo	200 metre freestyle	1:46.99	11 Q	1:45.15	2 Q	1:44.75	1st place, gold medalist(s)
Ji Yu-chan	50 metre freestyle	21.93	10 Q	21.87	12	Did not advance	
Kim Min-suk	200 metre individual medley	2:01.52	16 Q	2:00.75	15	Did not advance	
Kim Woo-min	400 metre freestyle	3:45.14	3 Q	—		3:42.71	1st place, gold medalist(s)
Kim Woo-min	800 metre freestyle	Did not start		—		Did not advance	
Kim Min-seop	400 metre individual medley	4:20.93	14	—		Did not advance	
Lee Ho-joon	200 metre freestyle	1:46.97	10 Q	1:47.38	15	Did not advance	
Lee Ju-ho	100 metre backstroke	53.81	8 Q	53.82	10	Did not advance	
Lee Ju-ho	200 metre backstroke	1:58.29	9 Q	1:56.40	3 Q	1:56.38	5
Lee Sang-hoon	200 metre breaststroke	2:12.43	14 Q	2:11.87	13	Did not advance	
Park Jung-hun	200 metre butterfly	1:58.29	19	Did not advance			
Yang Jae-hoon	100 metre butterfly	55.39	44	Did not advance			
Yoon Ji-hwan	50 metre backstroke	25.01	9 Q	25.14	16	Did not advance	
Yang Jae-hoon; Ji Yu-chan; Lee Yoo-yeon; Kim Min-suk	4 × 100 m freestyle relay	3:17.11	12	—		Did not advance	
Yang Jae-hoon; Kim Woo-min; Lee Ho-joon; Hwang Sun-woo; Lee Yoo-yeon	4 × 200 m freestyle relay	7:07.61	2 Q	—		7:01.94	2nd place, silver medalist(s)
Lee Ju-ho; Choi Dong-yeol; Yang Jae-hoon; Hwang Sun-woo	4 × 100 m medley relay	3:35.85	11	—		Did not advance	

Women

Athlete	Event	Heat		Semifinal		Final	
Athlete	Event	Time	Rank	Time	Rank	Time	Rank
Han Da-kyung	400 metre freestyle	4:18.38	24	—		Did not advance	
Han Da-kyung	800 metre freestyle	8:54.74	22	—		Did not advance	
Hur Yeon-kyung	200 metre freestyle	2:00.78	26	Did not advance			
Kim Seo-yeong	200 metre individual medley	2:13.85	10 Q	2:12.72	10	Did not advance	
Kim Seung-won	50 metre backstroke	28.96	23	Did not advance			
Kim Seung-won	200 metre backstroke	2:17.16	22	Did not advance			
Moon Su-a	100 metre breaststroke	1:09.93	28	Did not advance			
Moon Su-a	200 metre breaststroke	2:27.53	14 Q	2:26.76	11	Did not advance	
Park Su-jin	200 metre butterfly	2:10.28	6 Q	2:09.22	7 Q	2:10.09	8
Park Jung-won	100 metre butterfly	59.32	16 Q	58.75	13	Did not advance	
Song Jae-yun	100 metre backstroke	1:02.74	25	Did not advance			
Han Da-kyung; Hur Yeon-kyung; Kim Seo-yeong; Park Su-jin	4 × 200 m freestyle relay	8:06.40	14	—		Did not advance	
Song Jae-yun; Moon Su-a; Kim Seo-yeong; Hur Yeon-kyung	4 × 100 metre medley relay	Disqualified		—		Did not advance	
