= South Africa at the 2024 World Aquatics Championships =

- Flag of South Africa
- FINA code: RSA
- National federation: Swimming South Africa
- Website: swimsa.org

in Doha, Qatar
- Competitors: 60 in 5 sports
- Medals Ranked 34th: Gold 0 Silver 0 Bronze 1 Total 1

World Aquatics Championships appearances
- 1973; 1975; 1978; 1982; 1986; 1991; 1994; 1998; 2001; 2003; 2005; 2007; 2009; 2011; 2013; 2015; 2017; 2019; 2022; 2023; 2024

South Africa competed at the 2024 World Aquatics Championships in Doha, Qatar from 2 to 18 February.

== Medalists ==
Medal	Name	Sport	Event	Date
3rd place, bronze medalist(s)	Pieter Coetze	Swimming	Men's 200 metre backstroke	16 February 2024

== Competitors ==
The following is the list of competitors in the Championships.

Sport	Men	Women	Total
Artistic swimming	0	6	6
Diving	1	3	4
Open water swimming	4	3	7
Swimming	5	8	13
Water polo	15	15	30
Total	25	35	60

== Artistic swimming ==
Women

Athlete	Event	Preliminaries		Final	
Athlete	Event	Points	Rank	Points	Rank
Jessica Hayes-Hill; Laura Strugnell	Duet technical routine	Did not start		Did not advance	
Jessica Hayes-Hill; Laura Strugnell	Duet free routine	Did not start		Did not advance	

Mixed

Athlete	Event	Preliminaries		Final	
Athlete	Event	Points	Rank	Points	Rank
Holly de Bruyn; Ella Huang; Phindy Makhaye; Tayla-Jade van Huyssteen; Casey Williams; Sarah Williams	Team technical routine	118.8650	17	Did not advance	

== Diving ==
Men

Athlete	Event	Preliminaries		Semifinals		Final	
Athlete	Event	Points	Rank	Points	Rank	Points	Rank
Anathi Shozi	1 m springboard	128.45	45	—		Did not advance	

Women

Athlete	Event	Preliminaries		Semifinals		Final	
Athlete	Event	Points	Rank	Points	Rank	Points	Rank
Bailey Heydra	1 m springboard	201.35	29	—		Did not advance	
Bailey Heydra	3 m springboard	206.40	42	Did not advance			
Zalika Methula	1 m springboard	181.05	35	—		Did not advance	
Julia Vincent	3 m springboard	247.80	16 Q	280.90	10 Q	279.40	9

== Open water swimming ==
Men

Athlete	Event	Time	Rank
Connor Albertyn	Men's 5 km	55:19.7	47
Ruan Breytenbach	Men's 10 km	1:54:41.2	58
Henre Louw	Men's 10 km	1:54:33.1	53
Rossouw Venter	Men's 5 km	57:40.8	63

Women

Athlete	Event	Time	Rank
Amica de Jager	Women's 5 km	59:04.0	22
Amica de Jager	Women's 10 km	1:58:38.6	27
Tory Earle	Women's 5 km	59:06.3	25
Callan Lotter	Women's 10 km	2:00:07.9	29

Mixed

Athlete	Event	Time	Rank
Ruan Breytenbach; Amica de Jager; Callan Lotter; Rossouw Venter	Team relay	1:08:42.0	15

== Swimming ==
South Africa entered 13 swimmers.

Men

Athlete	Event	Heat		Semifinal		Final	
Athlete	Event	Time	Rank	Time	Rank	Time	Rank
Pieter Coetze	50 metre backstroke	24.75	4 Q	24.46	3 Q	24.59	4
Pieter Coetze	100 metre backstroke	53.32	1 Q	53.07	2 Q	53.51	5
Pieter Coetze	200 metre backstroke	1:57.90	3 Q	1:57.07	8 Q	1:55.99	3rd place, bronze medalist(s)
Clayton Jimmie	50 metre freestyle	22.33	31	Did not advance			
Chad le Clos	100 metre freestyle	49.04	18	Did not advance			
Chad le Clos	50 metre butterfly	23.47	13 Q	23.68	16	Did not advance	
Chad le Clos	100 metre butterfly	52.04	8 Q	51.70	5 Q	51.48	5
Chad le Clos	200 metre butterfly	Did not start		Did not advance			
Matthew Randle	100 metre breaststroke	1:01.80	28	Did not advance			
Matthew Randle	200 metre breaststroke	2:16.10	22	Did not advance			
Matthew Sates	200 metre freestyle	1:47.98	27	Did not advance			
Matthew Sates	100 metre butterfly	52.52; 51.80	16 S/off; 1 q	51.99	10	Did not advance	
Matthew Sates	200 metre butterfly	1:56.40	6 Q	1:55.88	7 Q	1:57.23	8
Matthew Sates	200 metre individual medley	2:00.28	10 Q	2:01.21	16	Did not advance	
Matthew Sates	400 metre individual medley	4:25.04	17	—		Did not advance	
Pieter Coetze; Matthew Randle; Chad le Clos; Clayton Jimmie	4 × 100 m medley relay	3:37.29	16	—		Did not advance	

Women

Athlete	Event	Heat		Semifinal		Final	
Athlete	Event	Time	Rank	Time	Rank	Time	Rank
Emma Chelius	50 metre freestyle	25.50	23	Did not advance			
Duné Coetzee	200 metre freestyle	2:01.02	28	Did not advance			
Duné Coetzee	400 metre freestyle	4:12.03	14	—		Did not advance	
Duné Coetzee	800 metre freestyle	Did not start		—		Did not advance	
Milla Drakopoulos	100 metre backstroke	1:02.80	26	Did not advance			
Erin Gallagher	50 metre freestyle	25.37	17	Did not advance			
Erin Gallagher	100 metre freestyle	55.36	18 Q	54.53	11	Did not advance	
Erin Gallagher	50 metre butterfly	25.69	3 Q	25.86	6 Q	25.69	4
Erin Gallagher	100 metre butterfly	57.59 AF	3 Q	57.92	6 Q	57.83	7
Stephanie Houtman	1500 metre freestyle	16:35.39	18	—		Did not advance	
Tayla Jonker	50 metre backstroke	28.37 NR	12 Q	28.48	15	Did not advance	
Hannah Pearse	200 metre backstroke	2:13.26	16 Q	2:13.29	15	Did not advance	
Lara van Niekerk	50 metre breaststroke	30.28	4 Q	30.56	5 Q	30.47	4
Lara van Niekerk	100 metre breaststroke	1:07.61	14 Q	1:07.25	13	Did not advance	
Milla Drakopoulos; Lara van Niekerk; Erin Gallagher; Emma Chelius	4 × 100 m medley relay	4:03.54	10	—		Did not advance	

Mixed

Athlete	Event	Heat		Semifinal		Final	
Athlete	Event	Time	Rank	Time	Rank	Time	Rank
Pieter Coetze; Lara van Niekerk; Erin Gallagher; Clayton Jimmie	4 × 100 m medley relay	3:48.03	10	—		Did not advance	

== Water polo ==
Summary

Team	Event	Group stage				Playoff	Quarterfinal	Semifinal	Final / BM	
Team	Event	Opposition Score	Opposition Score	Opposition Score	Rank	Opposition Score	Opposition Score	Opposition Score	Opposition Score	Rank
South Africa	Men's tournament	Spain; L 5–21	Australia; L 7–29	Croatia; L 6-29	4	—	—	Brazil; L 5–18	Kazakhstan; W 11–10	15
South Africa	Women's tournament	Canada; L 2–24	Italy; L 3–25	Great Britain; L 5–14	4	—	—	Singapore; W 20–6	France; L 8-19	14

=== Men's tournament ===
Team roster

The following is the South African roster.

Head coach: Jon Marc De Carvalho

- 1 Lwazi Madi GK
- 2 Farouk Mayman FP
- 3 Niall Wheeler FP
- 4 Cameron Laurenson FP
- 5 Todd Howard FP
- 6 Ross Stone FP
- 7 Sven van Zyl FP
- 8 Manqoba Bungane FP
- 9 Dane Tucker FP
- 10 Joshua Faber FP
- 11 Matthew Neser FP
- 12 Jonathan Swanepoel FP
- 13 Gareth May GK
- 14 Liam Neill FP
- 15 Janco Rademeyer FP

Group play

Pos	Team	Pld	W	PSW	PSL	L	GF	GA	GD	Pts	Qualification
1	Spain	3	3	0	0	0	46	20	+26	9	Quarterfinals
2	Croatia	3	2	0	0	1	48	24	+24	6	Playoffs
3	Australia	3	1	0	0	2	46	35	+11	3	Playoffs
4	South Africa	3	0	0	0	3	18	79	−61	0	13–16th place semifinals

Source: World Aquatics
Rules for classification: 1) points; 2) head-to-head points; 3) head-to-head goal difference; 4) head-to-head number of goals scored; 5) Goal difference.

5 February 2024; 09:00	Report	South Africa	5–21	Spain	Aspire Dome, Doha; Referees: Viktor Salnichenko (KAZ), Cheng Beng Guan (SGP)
5 February 2024; 09:00	Report	Score by quarters: 1–6, 0–7, 0–4, 4–4			Aspire Dome, Doha; Referees: Viktor Salnichenko (KAZ), Cheng Beng Guan (SGP)
5 February 2024; 09:00	Report	Van Zyl 3	Goals	Biel, Granados 4	Aspire Dome, Doha; Referees: Viktor Salnichenko (KAZ), Cheng Beng Guan (SGP)

7 February 2024; 13:30	Report	Australia	29–7	South Africa	Aspire Dome, Doha; Referees: David Couper (NZL), Cheng Beng Guan (SGP)
7 February 2024; 13:30	Report	Score by quarters: 6–2, 8–1, 7–1, 8–3			Aspire Dome, Doha; Referees: David Couper (NZL), Cheng Beng Guan (SGP)
7 February 2024; 13:30	Report	Edwards 6	Goals	Stone 2	Aspire Dome, Doha; Referees: David Couper (NZL), Cheng Beng Guan (SGP)

9 February 2024; 16:00	Report	South Africa	6–29	Croatia	Aspire Dome, Doha; Referees: Ashleigh Kaeshler (AUS), Yuri Maciel (BRA)
9 February 2024; 16:00	Report	Score by quarters: 2–7, 1–7, 3–7, 0–8			Aspire Dome, Doha; Referees: Ashleigh Kaeshler (AUS), Yuri Maciel (BRA)
9 February 2024; 16:00	Report	Tucker 2	Goals	Marinić Kragić 5	Aspire Dome, Doha; Referees: Ashleigh Kaeshler (AUS), Yuri Maciel (BRA)

13–16th place semifinals

11 February 2024; 09:00	Report	South Africa	5–18	Brazil	Aspire Dome, Doha; Referees: Matan Schwartz (ISR), Giuliana Nicolosi (ITA)
11 February 2024; 09:00	Report	Score by quarters: 4–5, 0–4, 0–3, 1–6			Aspire Dome, Doha; Referees: Matan Schwartz (ISR), Giuliana Nicolosi (ITA)
11 February 2024; 09:00	Report	Howard 2	Goals	Freitas, R. Real 4	Aspire Dome, Doha; Referees: Matan Schwartz (ISR), Giuliana Nicolosi (ITA)

15th place game

13 February 2024; 09:00	Report	South Africa	11–10	Kazakhstan	Aspire Dome, Doha; Referees: David Couper (NZL), Asumi Tsuzaki (JPN)
13 February 2024; 09:00	Report	Score by quarters: 3–0, 4–3, 1–4, 3–3			Aspire Dome, Doha; Referees: David Couper (NZL), Asumi Tsuzaki (JPN)
13 February 2024; 09:00	Report	Swanepoel 4	Goals	Akhmetov 3	Aspire Dome, Doha; Referees: David Couper (NZL), Asumi Tsuzaki (JPN)

=== Women's tournament ===
Team roster

The following is the South African roster.

Head coach: Nicola Barrett

- 1 Meghan Maartens GK
- 2 Amber Penney FP
- 3 Annie Thornton-Dibb FP
- 4 Boati Motau FP
- 5 Megan Sileno FP
- 6 Amica Hallendorff FP
- 7 Shakira January FP
- 8 Esihle Zondo FP
- 9 Ruby Versfeld FP
- 10 Nicola Macleod FP
- 11 Chloe Meecham FP
- 12 Kelsey White FP
- 13 Daniela Passoni GK
- 14 Tumaini Macdonell FP
- 15 Yanah Geber FP

Group play

Pos	Team	Pld	W	PSW	PSL	L	GF	GA	GD	Pts	Qualification
1	Italy	3	3	0	0	0	59	21	+38	9	Quarterfinals
2	Canada	3	2	0	0	1	52	19	+33	6	Playoffs
3	Great Britain	3	1	0	0	2	29	47	−18	3	Playoffs
4	South Africa	3	0	0	0	3	10	63	−53	0	13–16th place semifinals

Source: World Aquatics
Rules for classification: 1) points; 2) head-to-head points; 3) head-to-head goal difference; 4) head-to-head number of goals scored; 5) Goal difference.

4 February 2024; 20:30	Report	South Africa	2–24	Canada	Aspire Dome, Doha; Referees: Viktor Salnichenko (KAZ), Yuri Maciel (BRA)
4 February 2024; 20:30	Report	Score by quarters: 0–6, 0–3, 2–8, 0–7			Aspire Dome, Doha; Referees: Viktor Salnichenko (KAZ), Yuri Maciel (BRA)
4 February 2024; 20:30	Report	Meecham, Zondo 1	Goals	three players 5	Aspire Dome, Doha; Referees: Viktor Salnichenko (KAZ), Yuri Maciel (BRA)

6 February 2024; 16:00	Report	Italy	25–3	South Africa	Aspire Dome, Doha; Referees: Andreia Stanojević (SRB), Yuri Maciel (BRA)
6 February 2024; 16:00	Report	Score by quarters: 6–1, 5–1, 6–1, 8–0			Aspire Dome, Doha; Referees: Andreia Stanojević (SRB), Yuri Maciel (BRA)
6 February 2024; 16:00	Report	Giustini 5	Goals	Versfeld 2	Aspire Dome, Doha; Referees: Andreia Stanojević (SRB), Yuri Maciel (BRA)

8 February 2024; 10:30	Report	South Africa	5–14	Great Britain	Aspire Dome, Doha; Referees: Viktor Salnichenko (KAZ), Asumi Tsuzaki (JPN)
8 February 2024; 10:30	Report	Score by quarters: 2–5, 0–4, 1–5, 2–0			Aspire Dome, Doha; Referees: Viktor Salnichenko (KAZ), Asumi Tsuzaki (JPN)
8 February 2024; 10:30	Report	Penney 2	Goals	Falvey 3	Aspire Dome, Doha; Referees: Viktor Salnichenko (KAZ), Asumi Tsuzaki (JPN)

13–16th place semifinals

10 February 2024; 10:30	Report	Singapore	6–20	South Africa	Aspire Dome, Doha; Referees: Giuliana Nicolosi (ITA), David Couper (NZL)
10 February 2024; 10:30	Report	Score by quarters: 3–4, 1–5, 0–5, 2–6			Aspire Dome, Doha; Referees: Giuliana Nicolosi (ITA), David Couper (NZL)
10 February 2024; 10:30	Report	Yap 2	Goals	Versfeld 4	Aspire Dome, Doha; Referees: Giuliana Nicolosi (ITA), David Couper (NZL)

13th place game

12 February 2024; 10:30	Report	France	19–8	South Africa	Aspire Dome, Doha; Referees: Yuri Maciel (BRA), Cheng Beng Guan (SGP)
12 February 2024; 10:30	Report	Score by quarters: 5–0, 5–3, 6–3, 3–2			Aspire Dome, Doha; Referees: Yuri Maciel (BRA), Cheng Beng Guan (SGP)
12 February 2024; 10:30	Report	Vernoux 5	Goals	Geber, Versfeld 2	Aspire Dome, Doha; Referees: Yuri Maciel (BRA), Cheng Beng Guan (SGP)
