= Swimming at the 2024 World Aquatics Championships – Women's 200 metre freestyle =

Women's 200 metre freestyle at the Swimming at the 2024 World Aquatics Championships
- Venue: Aspire Dome
- Location: Doha, Qatar
- Dates: 13 February (heats and semifinals); 14 February (final)
- Competitors: 50 from 46 nations
- Winning time: 1:54.89

Medalists
gold medal	Siobhán Haughey	Hong Kong
silver medal	Erika Fairweather	New Zealand
bronze medal	Brianna Throssell	Australia

The Women's 200 metre freestyle competition at the 2024 World Aquatics Championships was held on 13 and 14 February 2024.

== Qualification ==
Each National Federation was permitted to enter a maximum of two qualified athletes in each individual event, but only if both of them had attained the "A" standard qualification time at approved qualifying events. For this event, the "A" standard qualification time was 1:58.66. Federations could enter one athlete into the event if they met the "B" standard qualification time. For this event, the "B" standard qualification time was 2:02.81. Athletes could also enter the event if they had met an "A" or "B" standard in a different event and their Federation had not entered anyone else. Additional considerations applied to Federations who had few swimmers enter through the standard qualification times. Federations in this category could at least enter two men and two women into the competition, all of whom could enter into up to two events.

== Records ==
Prior to the competition, the existing world and championship records were as follows.

World record	Mollie O'Callaghan (AUS)	1:52.85	Fukuoka, Japan	26 July 2023
Competition record	Mollie O'Callaghan (AUS)	1:52.85	Fukuoka, Japan	26 July 2023

== Results ==
=== Heats ===
The heats were started on 13 February at 09:45.

Rank	Heat	Lane	Name	Nationality	Time	Notes
1	3	5	Li Bingjie	China	1:57.16	Q
2	3	4	Erika Fairweather	New Zealand	1:57.40	Q
3	5	3	Nikolett Pádár	Hungary	1:57.42	Q
4	5	4	Siobhán Haughey	Hong Kong	1:57.62	Q
5	3	3	Ai Yanhan	China	1:58.06	Q
6	5	5	Marrit Steenbergen	Netherlands	1:58.18	Q
7	4	6	Maria Fernanda Costa	Brazil	1:58.22	Q
8	4	5	Barbora Seemanová	Czech Republic	1:58.25	Q
9	4	3	Brianna Throssell	Australia	1:58.29	Q
10	5	2	Addison Sauickie	United States	1:58.33	Q
11	4	4	Shayna Jack	Australia	1:58.40	Q
11	5	6	Valentine Dumont	Belgium	1:58.40	Q
13	3	1	Rebecca Smith	Canada	1:59.00	Q
14	5	1	Daria Golovaty	Israel	1:59.11	Q
15	4	2	Janja Šegel	Slovenia	1:59.37	Q
16	5	7	Janna van Kooten	Netherlands	1:59.41	Q
17	3	6	Lucy Hope	Great Britain	1:59.56	
18	3	7	Giulia D'Innocenzo	Italy	1:59.57	
19	4	0	Victoria Catterson	Ireland	1:59.75	
20	4	1	Francisca Soares Martins	Portugal	2:00.10	
21	3	2	Nagisa Ikemoto	Japan	2:00.11	
22	3	0	Iris Julia Berger	Austria	2:00.20	
23	4	9	Batbayaryn Enkhkhüslen	Mongolia	2:00.22	
24	4	7	Anastasia Gorbenko	Israel	2:00.25	
25	2	3	Maria Daza Garcia	Spain	2:00.42	
26	5	8	Hur Yeon-kyung	South Korea	2:00.78	
27	3	8	Elisbet Gámez	Cuba	2:00.83	
28	4	8	Duné Coetzee	South Africa	2:01.02	
29	3	9	Ela Naz Özdemir	Turkey	2:01.51	
30	5	9	Maria Yegres	Venezuela	2:01.96	
31	5	0	Aleksandra Polańska	Poland	2:02.10	
32	2	5	Sylvia Statkevičius	Lithuania	2:03.03	
33	2	4	Kamonchanok Kwanmuang	Thailand	2:03.22	
34	2	1	Beatriz Padrón	Costa Rica	2:04.39	
35	2	8	Julimar Ávila	Honduras	2:04.43	
36	2	6	Ashley Lim	Singapore	2:05.05	
37	2	0	Harper Barrowman	Cayman Islands	2:06.36	
38	2	7	Teia Salvino	Philippines	2:08.02	
39	1	4	Hiruki de Silva	Sri Lanka	2:10.00	
40	2	2	Dhinidhi Desinghu	India	2:10.41	
41	2	9	Ani Poghosyan	Armenia	2:10.55	
42	1	5	Jehanara Nabi	Pakistan	2:10.59	
43	1	0	Lana Hijazi	Lebanon	2:11.95	
44	1	3	Duana Lama	Nepal	2:14.59	
45	1	6	Kaltra Meca	Albania	2:15.95	
46	1	9	Sara Akasha	United Arab Emirates	2:17.90	
47	1	2	Mia Lee	Guam	2:18.01	
48	1	8	Mashael Al-Ayed	Saudi Arabia	2:21.04	
49	1	7	Charissa Panuve	Tonga	2:23.33	
50	1	1	Galyah Mikel	Palau	2:37.22	

=== Semifinals ===
The semifinals were held on 13 February at 20:13.

Rank	Heat	Lane	Name	Nationality	Time	Notes
1	1	4	Erika Fairweather	New Zealand	1:55.75	Q
2	1	5	Siobhán Haughey	Hong Kong	1:56.04	Q
3	2	7	Shayna Jack	Australia	1:56.80	Q
4	1	6	Barbora Seemanová	Czech Republic	1:57.00	Q
5	2	2	Brianna Throssell	Australia	1:57.09	Q
6	2	6	Maria Fernanda Costa	Brazil	1:57.11	Q, SA
7	2	4	Li Bingjie	China	1:57.13	Q-->WD
8	2	5	Nikolett Pádár	Hungary	1:57.13	Q
9	1	3	Marrit Steenbergen	Netherlands	1:57.30	WD
10	2	3	Ai Yanhan	China	1:57.33	Q
11	2	1	Rebecca Smith	Canada	1:58.08	
12	1	2	Addison Sauickie	United States	1:58.51	
13	1	7	Valentine Dumont	Belgium	1:58.57	
14	1	1	Daria Golovaty	Israel	1:59.36	
15	2	8	Janja Šegel	Slovenia	1:59.95	
16	1	8	Janna van Kooten	Netherlands	2:00.44	

=== Final ===
The final was started on 14 February at 19:17.

Rank	Lane	Name	Nationality	Time	Notes
1st place, gold medalist(s)	5	Siobhán Haughey	Hong Kong	1:54.89	
2nd place, silver medalist(s)	4	Erika Fairweather	New Zealand	1:55.77	
3rd place, bronze medalist(s)	2	Brianna Throssell	Australia	1:56.00	
4	6	Barbora Seemanová	Czech Republic	1:56.13	
5	7	Maria Fernanda Costa	Brazil	1:56.85	SA
6	8	Nikolett Pádár	Hungary	1:56.89	
7	3	Shayna Jack	Australia	1:57.24	
8	1	Ai Yanhan	China	1:57.53	

== Sources ==
- "Competition Regulations" (PDF). World Aquatics. Archived (PDF) from the original on 15 February 2026.
