= Swimming at the 2024 World Aquatics Championships – Women's 800 metre freestyle =

Women's 800 metre freestyle at the Swimming at the 2024 World Aquatics Championships
- Venue: Aspire Dome
- Location: Doha, Qatar
- Dates: 16 February (heats); 17 February (final)
- Competitors: 28 from 24 nations
- Winning time: 8:17.44

Medalists
gold medal	Simona Quadarella	Italy
silver medal	Isabel Gose	Germany
bronze medal	Erika Fairweather	New Zealand

The Women's 800 metre freestyle competition at the 2024 World Aquatics Championships was held on 16 and 17 February 2024.

== Qualification ==
Each National Federation was permitted to enter a maximum of two qualified athletes in each individual event, but only if both of them had attained the "A" standard qualification time at approved qualifying events. For this event, the "A" standard qualification time was 8:37.90. Federations could enter one athlete into the event if they met the "B" standard qualification time. For this event, the "B" standard qualification time was 8:56.03. Athletes could also enter the event if they had met an "A" or "B" standard in a different event and their Federation had not entered anyone else. Additional considerations applied to Federations who had few swimmers enter through the standard qualification times. Federations in this category could at least enter two men and two women into the competition, all of whom could enter into up to two events.

== Records ==
Prior to the competition, the existing world and championship records were as follows.

World record	Katie Ledecky (USA)	8:04.79	Rio de Janeiro, Brazil	12 August 2016
Competition record	Katie Ledecky (USA)	8:07.39	Kazan, Russia	8 August 2015

== Results ==
=== Heats ===
The heats were started on 16 February at 11:07.

Rank	Heat	Lane	Name	Nationality	Time	Notes
1	2	4	Isabel Gose	Germany	8:26.49	Q
2	3	4	Simona Quadarella	Italy	8:27.80	Q
3	3	5	Erika Fairweather	New Zealand	8:28.15	Q
4	3	3	Eve Thomas	New Zealand	8:29.30	Q
5	3	2	Agostina Hein	Argentina	8:29.44	Q
6	2	3	Ajna Késely	Hungary	8:32.88	Q
7	2	6	Kiah Melverton	Australia	8:35.22	Q
8	2	8	Ichika Kajimoto	Japan	8:35.25	Q
8	3	6	Maddy Gough	Australia	8:35.25	Q
10	3	7	Yang Peiqi	China	8:36.75	
11	3	9	Gabrielle Roncatto	Brazil	8:37.00	
12	2	7	Ma Yonghui	China	8:37.66	
13	2	0	Merve Tuncel	Turkey	8:38.10	
14	2	9	Kristel Köbrich	Chile	8:38.81	
15	2	2	Kayla Han	United States	8:40.36	
16	1	4	Ella Cosgrove	Canada	8:43.33	
17	3	1	Beatriz Dizotti	Brazil	8:43.73	
18	2	1	Alisée Pisane	Belgium	8:45.28	
19	3	0	Tamila Holub	Portugal	8:45.94	
20	1	3	Imani de Jong	Netherlands	8:49.08	
21	1	6	Ashley Lim	Singapore	8:54.29	
22	1	5	Han Da-kyung	South Korea	8:54.74	
23	1	2	Diana Taszhanova	Kazakhstan	8:55.78	
24	1	1	Eva Petrovska	North Macedonia	9:04.27	
25	1	8	Lana Hijazi	Lebanon	9:33.90	
	1	7	Marlene Kahler	Austria	Did not start	
	2	5	Anastasiia Kirpichnikova	France	Did not start	
	3	8	Dune Coetzee	South Africa	Did not start	

=== Final ===
The final was held on 17 February at 20:23.

Rank	Lane	Name	Nationality	Time	Notes
1st place, gold medalist(s)	5	Simona Quadarella	Italy	8:17.44	
2nd place, silver medalist(s)	4	Isabel Gose	Germany	8:17.53	
3rd place, bronze medalist(s)	3	Erika Fairweather	New Zealand	8:22.26	
4	6	Eve Thomas	New Zealand	8:24.86	
5	2	Agostina Hein	Argentina	8:29.19	
6	8	Ichika Kajimoto	Japan	8:29.24	
7	1	Kiah Melverton	Australia	8:29.35	
8	7	Ajna Késely	Hungary	8:29.83	
9	0	Maddy Gough	Australia	8:36.43	

== Sources ==
- "Competition Regulations" (PDF). World Aquatics. Archived (PDF) from the original on 15 February 2026.
