= Mexico at the 2024 World Aquatics Championships =

- Flag of Mexico
- FINA code: MEX
- National federation: Mexican Swimming Federation

in Doha, Qatar
- Competitors: 44 in 5 sports
- Medals Ranked 16th: Gold 1 Silver 1 Bronze 4 Total 6

World Aquatics Championships appearances
- 1973; 1975; 1978; 1982; 1986; 1991; 1994; 1998; 2001; 2003; 2005; 2007; 2009; 2011; 2013; 2015; 2017; 2019; 2022; 2023; 2024

Mexico competed at the 2024 World Aquatics Championships in Doha, Qatar, from 2 to 18 February.

== Medalists ==
| Medal | Name | Sport | Event | Date |
|---|---|---|---|---|
| 1st place, gold medalist(s) | Osmar Olvera | Diving | Men's 1 metre springboard | 3 February 2024 |
| 2nd place, silver medalist(s) | Gabriela Agúndez; Randal Willars; Jahir Ocampo; Aranza Vázquez | Diving | Team event | 2 February 2024 |
| 3rd place, bronze medalist(s) | Kevin Berlín; Alejandra Estudillo | Diving | Mixed synchronized 10 metre platform | 3 February 2024 |
| 3rd place, bronze medalist(s) | Miranda Barrera; Diego Villalobos | Artistic swimming | Mixed duet technical routine | 4 February 2024 |
| 3rd place, bronze medalist(s) | Osmar Olvera | Diving | Men's 3 metre springboard | 7 February 2024 |
| 3rd place, bronze medalist(s) | Trinidad Meza; Diego Villalobos | Artistic swimming | Mixed duet free routine | 10 February 2024 |

== Competitors ==
The following is the list of competitors in the Championships.

| Sport | Men | Women | Total |
|---|---|---|---|
| Artistic swimming | 2 | 11 | 13 |
| Diving | 6 | 6 | 12 |
| High diving | 2 | 0 | 2 |
| Open water swimming | 3 | 3 | 6 |
| Swimming | 7 | 4 | 11 |
| Total | 20 | 24 | 44 |

== Artistic swimming ==
Men

| Athlete | Event | Preliminaries | | Final | |
| Athlete | Event | Points | Rank | Points | Rank |
|---|---|---|---|---|---|
| Diego Villalobos | Solo technical routine | 210.7850 | 6 Q | 221.5433 | 5 |
| Joel Benavides | Solo free routine | 140.6459 | 7 Q | 134.2562 | 7 |

Women

| Athlete | Event | Preliminaries | | Final | |
| Athlete | Event | Points | Rank | Points | Rank |
|---|---|---|---|---|---|
| Nuria Diosdado; Joana Jiménez | Duet technical routine | 223.2233 | 12 Q | 203.8166 | 11 |

Mixed

| Athlete | Event | Preliminaries | | Final | |
| Athlete | Event | Points | Rank | Points | Rank |
|---|---|---|---|---|---|
| Miranda Barrera; Diego Villalobos | Duet technical routine | 217.6450 | 5 Q | 217.5192 | 3rd place, bronze medalist(s) |
| Trinidad Meza; Diego Villalobos | Duet free routine | 183.4813 | 3 Q | 192.5772 | 3rd place, bronze medalist(s) |
| Nuria Diosdado; Daniela Estrada; Itzamary Gonzalez; Glenda Inzunza; Joana Jiménez; Luisa Rodríguez; Jessica Sobrino; Pamela Toscano | Team acrobatic routine | 225.0267 | 3 Q | 187.6499 | 10 |

== Diving ==
Men

| Athlete | Event | Preliminaries | | Semifinals | | Final | |
| Athlete | Event | Points | Rank | Points | Rank | Points | Rank |
|---|---|---|---|---|---|---|---|
| Kevin Berlín | 10 m platform | 435.80 | 6 Q | 410.60 | 10 | 389.25 | 10 |
| Juan Celaya | 1 m springboard | 373.70 | 6 Q | — | | 324.15 | 12 |
| Rodrigo Diego | 3 m springboard | 340.40 | 31 | Did not advance | | | |
| Osmar Olvera | 1 m springboard | 406.30 | 1 Q | — | | 431.75 | 1st place, gold medalist(s) |
| Osmar Olvera | 3 m springboard | 445.55 | 3 Q | 458.35 | 3 Q | 498.40 | 3rd place, bronze medalist(s) |
| Randal Willars | 10 m platform | 449.75 | 4 Q | 468.55 | 2 Q | 505.00 | 4 |
| Rodrigo Diego; Osmar Olvera | 3 m synchro springboard | — | | | | 383.19 | 4 |
| Kevin Berlín; Randal Willars | 10 m synchro platform | — | | | | 390.87 | 4 |

Women

| Athlete | Event | Preliminaries | | Semifinals | | Final | |
| Athlete | Event | Points | Rank | Points | Rank | Points | Rank |
|---|---|---|---|---|---|---|---|
| Gabriela Agúndez | 10 m platform | 301.80 | 7 Q | 311.45 | 6 Q | 316.30 | 7 |
| Arantxa Chávez | 1 m springboard | 232.80 | 10 Q | — | | 249.70 | 5 |
| Alejandra Estudillo | 3 m springboard | 241.80 | 22 | Did not advance | | | |
| Alejandra Orozco | 10 m platform | 305.70 | 6 Q | 317.50 | 5 Q | 291.80 | 9 |
| Paola Pineda | 1 m springboard | 230.85 | 13 | — | | Did not advance | |
| Aranza Vázquez | 3 m springboard | 283.80 | 5 Q | 291.40 | 6 | 284.10 | 7 |
| Arantxa Chávez; Paola Pineda | 3 m synchro springboard | — | | | | 269.55 | 7 |
| Gabriela Agúndez; Alejandra Orozco | 10 m synchro platform | — | | | | 296.34 | 4 |

Mixed

| Athlete | Event | Final | |
| Athlete | Event | Points | Rank |
|---|---|---|---|
| Jahir Ocampo; Paola Pineda | 3 m synchro springboard | 275.31 | 5 |
| Kevin Berlín; Alejandra Estudillo | 10 m synchro platform | 296.13 | 3rd place, bronze medalist(s) |
| Gabriela Agúndez; Randal Willars; Jahir Ocampo; Aranza Vázquez | Team event | 412.80 | 2nd place, silver medalist(s) |

== High diving ==
| Athlete | Event | Points | Rank |
|---|---|---|---|
| Sergio Guzmán | Men's high diving | 357.15 | 6 |
| Yolotl Martínez | Men's high diving | 363.30 | 5 |

== Open water swimming ==
Men

| Athlete | Event | Time | Rank |
|---|---|---|---|
| Daniel Delgadillo | Men's 10 km | 1:57:05.0 | 60 |
| Santiago Gutiérrez | Men's 5 km | 55:22.6 | 49 |
| Paulo Strehlke | Men's 5 km | 51:36.8 | 10 |
| Paulo Strehlke | Men's 10 km | 1:49:05.9 | 18 |

Women

| Athlete | Event | Time | Rank |
|---|---|---|---|
| Paulina Alanís | Women's 10 km | 2:06:16.6 | 43 |
| Karla Edith de la Rosa | Women's 5 km | 1:04:56.4 | 49 |
| Martha Sandoval | Women's 5 km | 59:03.6 | 21 |
| Martha Sandoval | Women's 10 km | 1:58:21.6 | 23 |

Mixed

| Athlete | Event | Time | Rank |
|---|---|---|---|
| Martha Sandoval; Santiago Gutiérrez; Paulina Alanís; Paulo Strehlke | Team relay | 1:07:29.5 | 12 |

== Swimming ==
Mexico entered 11 swimmers.

Men

| Athlete | Event | Heat | | Semifinal | | Final | |
| Athlete | Event | Time | Rank | Time | Rank | Time | Rank |
|---|---|---|---|---|---|---|---|
| Diego Camacho | 50 metre backstroke | 25.97 | 24 | Did not advance | | | |
| Diego Camacho | 200 metre backstroke | 2:07.00 | 29 | Did not advance | | | |
| Miguel de Lara | 50 metre breaststroke | 27.89 | 20 | Did not advance | | | |
| Miguel de Lara | 100 metre breaststroke | 1:00.88 | 25 | Did not advance | | | |
| Miguel de Lara | 200 metre breaststroke | 2:12.50 | 15 Q | 2:12.58 | 15 | Did not advance | |
| Andrés Dupont | 50 metre butterfly | Did not start | | Did not advance | | | |
| Jorge Iga | 100 metre freestyle | 49.35 | 29 | Did not advance | | | |
| Jorge Iga | 200 metre freestyle | 1:47.56 | 22 | Did not advance | | | |
| Jorge Iga | 100 metre butterfly | 53.58 | 30 | Did not advance | | | |
| José Martínez | 200 metre individual medley | 2:05.21 | 32 | Did not advance | | | |
| Dylan Porges | 400 metre freestyle | 3:53.11 | 32 | Did not advance | | Did not advance | |
| Dylan Porges | 800 metre freestyle | 8:05.83 | 30 | Did not advance | | Did not advance | |
| Dylan Porges | 1500 metre freestyle | 15:32.79 | 26 | Did not advance | | Did not advance | |
| Héctor Ruvalcaba | 200 metre butterfly | 1:59.08 | 22 | Did not advance | | | |
| Andres Dupont; Héctor Ruvalcaba; José Ángel Martínez; Jorge Iga | 4 × 100 m freestyle relay | 3:20.41 | 15 | — | | Did not advance | |
| Jorge Iga; Andrés Dupont; Héctor Ruvalcaba; Dylan Porges | 4 × 200 m freestyle relay | 7:15.76 NR | 12 | — | | Did not advance | |
| Diego Camacho; Miguel de Lara; Jorge Iga; Andres Dupont | 4 × 100 m medley relay | 3:36.88 NR | 14 | — | | Did not advance | |

Women

| Athlete | Event | Heat | | Semifinal | | Final | |
| Athlete | Event | Time | Rank | Time | Rank | Time | Rank |
|---|---|---|---|---|---|---|---|
| María José Mata Cocco | 100 metre butterfly | 1:00.39 | 24 | Did not advance | | | |
| María José Mata Cocco | 200 metre butterfly | 2:11.08 | 9 Q | 2:11.17 | 11 | Did not advance | |
| Tayde Revilak | 50 metre freestyle | 25.73 | 31 | Did not advance | | | |
| Melissa Rodríguez | 50 metre breaststroke | 32.15 | 28 | Did not advance | | | |
| Melissa Rodríguez | 100 metre breaststroke | 1:08.91 | 23 | Did not advance | | | |
| Melissa Rodríguez | 200 metre breaststroke | 2:28.90 | 16 Q | 2:29.18 | 15 | Did not advance | |
| Tayde Sansores | 50 metre backstroke | 28.76 | 21 | Did not advance | | | |
| Tayde Sansores | 50 metre butterfly | 27.18 | 28 | Did not advance | | | |
| Tayde Sansores; Melissa Rodríguez; María José Mata Cocco; Tayde Revilak | 4 × 100 m medley relay | 4:08.30 | 16 | — | | Did not advance | |
