= Swimming at the 2024 World Aquatics Championships – Men's 400 metre individual medley =

Men's 400 metre individual medley at the Swimming at the 2024 World Aquatics Championships
- Venue: Aspire Dome
- Location: Doha, Qatar
- Dates: 18 February (heats and final)
- Competitors: 26 from 24 nations
- Winning time: 4:09.72

Medalists
gold medal	Lewis Clareburt	New Zealand
silver medal	Max Litchfield	Great Britain
bronze medal	Daiya Seto	Japan

The Men's 400 metre individual medley competition at the 2024 World Aquatics Championships was held on 18 February 2024.

== Qualification ==
Each National Federation was permitted to enter a maximum of two qualified athletes in each individual event, but only if both of them had attained the "A" standard qualification time at approved qualifying events. For this event, the "A" standard qualification time was 4:17.48. Federations could enter one athlete into the event if they met the "B" standard qualification time. For this event, the "B" standard qualification time was 4:26.49. Athletes could also enter the event if they had met an "A" or "B" standard in a different event and their Federation had not entered anyone else. Additional considerations applied to Federations who had few swimmers enter through the standard qualification times. Federations in this category could at least enter two men and two women into the competition, all of whom could enter into up to two events.

== Records ==
Prior to the competition, the existing world and championship records were as follows.

World record	Léon Marchand (FRA)	4:02.50	Fukuoka, Japan	23 July 2023
Competition record	Léon Marchand (FRA)	4:02.50	Fukuoka, Japan	23 July 2023

== Results ==
=== Heats ===
The heats were held at 09:32.

Rank	Heat	Lane	Name	Nationality	Time	Notes
1	2	1	David Johnston	United States	4:12.51	Q
2	2	3	Max Litchfield	Great Britain	4:12.54	Q
3	2	4	Daiya Seto	Japan	4:13.06	Q
4	3	4	Carson Foster	United States	4:13.24	Q
5	3	3	Lewis Clareburt	New Zealand	4:13.61	Q
6	3	6	Balázs Holló	Hungary	4:13.93	Q
7	2	6	Lorne Wigginton	Canada	4:14.54	Q
8	3	5	Alberto Razzetti	Italy	4:15.84	Q
9	3	9	Robert-Andrei Badea	Romania	4:18.43	NR
10	3	1	Collyn Gagne	Canada	4:18.74	
11	2	0	Marius Toscan	Switzerland	4:19.24	
12	3	7	Zhang Zhanshuo	China	4:19.86	
13	3	8	Richard Nagy	Slovakia	4:20.76	
14	2	8	Kim Min-seop	South Korea	4:20.93	
15	1	6	Anže Ferš Eržen	Slovenia	4:23.64	
16	1	5	Jaouad Syoud	Algeria	4:23.66	
17	3	2	Matthew Sates	South Africa	4:25.04	
18	1	3	Tan Khai Xin	Malaysia	4:25.16	
19	1	4	Erick Gordillo	Guatemala	4:25.34	
20	2	9	Nguyễn Quang Thuấn	Vietnam	4:28.72	
21	3	0	Wang Hsing-hao	Chinese Taipei	4:39.53	
22	1	7	Oliver Durand	Namibia	4:42.64	
23	1	1	Ahmed Theibich	Bahrain	4:54.79	NR
	2	5	Tomoru Honda	Japan	Did not start	
	1	2	Jarod Arroyo	Puerto Rico	Disqualified	
	2	2	Apostolos Papastamos	Greece	Disqualified	
	2	7	Thomas Jansen	Netherlands	Disqualified	

=== Final ===
The final was held at 20:01.

Rank	Lane	Name	Nationality	Time	Notes
1st place, gold medalist(s)	2	Lewis Clareburt	New Zealand	4:09.72	
2nd place, silver medalist(s)	5	Max Litchfield	Great Britain	4:10.40	
3rd place, bronze medalist(s)	3	Daiya Seto	Japan	4:12.51	
4	6	Carson Foster	United States	4:12.62	
5	4	David Johnston	United States	4:13.05	
5	8	Alberto Razzetti	Italy	4:13.05	
7	1	Lorne Wigginton	Canada	4:14.98	
8	7	Balázs Holló	Hungary	4:19.66	

== Sources ==
- "Competition Regulations" (PDF). World Aquatics. Archived (PDF) from the original on 15 February 2026.
