= Swimming at the 2024 World Aquatics Championships – Men's 4 × 100 metre medley relay =

Men's 4 × 100 metre medley relay at the Swimming at the 2024 World Aquatics Championships
- Venue: Aspire Dome
- Location: Doha, Qatar
- Dates: 18 February (heats and final)
- Competitors: 88 from 22 nations
- Teams: 22
- Winning time: 3:29.80

Medalists
gold medal	Hunter Armstrong; Nic Fink; Zach Harting; Matt King; Jack Aikins; Jake Foster; Shaine Casas; Luke Hobson	United States
silver medal	Kai van Westering; Arno Kamminga; Nyls Korstanje; Stan Pijnenburg; Caspar Corbeau	Netherlands
bronze medal	Michele Lamberti; Nicolò Martinenghi; Gianmarco Sansone; Alessandro Miressi; Ludovico Viberti; Federico Burdisso	Italy

The Men's 4 × 100 metre medley relay competition at the 2024 World Aquatics Championships was held on 18 February 2024.

== Records ==
Prior to the competition, the existing world and championship records were as follows.

World record	United States	3:26.78	Tokyo, Japan	1 August 2021
Competition record	United States	3:27.20	Fukuoka, Japan	30 July 2023

== Results ==
=== Heats ===
The heats were held at 10:09.

Rank	Heat	Lane	Nation	Swimmers	Time	Notes
1	2	4	United States	Jack Aikins (53.84); Jake Foster (59.45); Shaine Casas (50.99); Luke Hobson (48.25)	3:32.53	Q
2	1	4	Netherlands	Kai van Westering (54.11); Caspar Corbeau (59.02); Nyls Korstanje (51.42); Stan Pijnenburg (48.34)	3:32.89	Q, NR
3	2	7	Spain	Hugo González (53.19); Carles Coll (1:00.56); Mario Molla Yanes (51.69); Sergio De Celis Montalban (48.13)	3:33.57	Q
4	3	2	Poland	Ksawery Masiuk (53.57); Jan Kałusowski (1:00.44); Jakub Majerski (51.29); Kamil Sieradzki (48.49)	3:33.79	Q
5	3	3	Canada	Blake Tierney (53.98)); James Dergousoff (1:00.77); Finlay Knox (51.90); Javier Acevedo (47.51)	3:34.16	Q
6	3	6	Italy	Michele Lamberti (54.23); Ludovico Blu Art Viberti (59.19); Federico Burdisso (52.25); Alessandro Miressi (48.53)	3:34.20	Q
7	2	6	Austria	Bernhard Reitshammer (54.77); Valentin Bayer (1:00.21); Simon Bucher (51.38); Heiko Gigler (47.93)	3:34.29	Q
8	3	7	Ireland	Conor Ferguson (54.04); Darragh Greene (1:00.16); Max McCusker (51.83); Shane Ryan (48.94)	3:34.97	Q
9	3	5	Australia	Bradley Woodward (54.17); Sam Williamson (59.11); Kai James Taylor (53.64); Jack Cartwright (48.63)	3:35.55	
10	3	1	Portugal	Gabriel Lopes (54.80); Francisco Robalo Quintas (1:01.15); Diogo Ribeiro (51.26); Miguel Nascimento (48.42)	3:35.63	=NR
11	2	5	South Korea	Lee Ju-ho (54.10); Choi Dong-yeol (1:00.07); Yang Jae-hoon (52.95); Hwang Sun-woo (48.73)	3:35.85	
12	3	4	China	Xu Yifan (56.44); Dong Zhihao (59.23); Wang Xizhe (52.76); Ji Xinjie (48.25)	3:36.68	
13	2	2	Hungary	Adam Jaszo (54.89); Daniel Sos (1:01.66); Richard Marton (52.50); Nandor Nemeth (47.81)	3:36.86	
14	2	1	Mexico	Diego Camacho Salgado (55.83); Miguel Alejandro de Lara Ojeda (1:00.52); Jorge Iga (52.46); Andres Dupont Cabrera (48.07)	3:36.88	NR
15	2	9	Greece	Evangelos Makrygiannis (53.61); Arkadios Aspougalis (1:01.97); Konstantinos Emmanouil Stamou (52.58); Stergios Marios Bilas (48.95)	3:37.11	
16	3	0	South Africa	Pieter Coetze (53.69); Matthew Randle (1:02.83); Chad le Clos (51.60); Clayton Jimmie (49.17)	3:37.29	
17	1	3	Bulgaria	Kaloyan Levterov (56.10); Lyubomir Epitropov (1:00.65); Josif Miladinov (52.61); Kaloyan Bratanov (48.56)	3:37.92	
18	1	5	Serbia	Velimir Stjepanovic (55.79); Uros Zivanovic (1:02.42); Durde Matic (51.89); Andrej Barna (47.88)	3:37.98	NR
19	2	8	Kazakhstan	Yegor Popov (55.86); Arsen Kozhakhmetov (1:01.92); Maxim Skazobtsov (52.92); Adilbek Mussin (48.51)	3:39.21	
20	2	3	Japan	Osamu Kato (54.55); Ikuru Hiroshima (1:01.28); Nao Horomura (53.00); Riki Abe (51.08)	3:39.91	
21	2	0	Thailand	Ratthawit Thammananthachote (58.54); Dulyawat Kaewsriyong (1:07.07); Navaphat Wongcharoen (54.22); Tonnam Kanteemool (51.69)	3:51.52	
22	3	9	Vietnam	Tran Hung Nguyen (1:00.72); Pham Thanh Bao (1:04.05); Nguyen Hoang Khang (58.70); Ngo Dinh Chuyen (54.52)	3:57.99	
	3	8	Sweden		Did not start	

=== Final ===
The final was held at 20:37.

Rank	Lane	Nation	Swimmers	Time	Notes
1st place, gold medalist(s)	4	United States	Hunter Armstrong (53.15); Nic Fink (58.20); Zach Harting (51.13); Matt King (47.32)	3:29.80	
2nd place, silver medalist(s)	5	Netherlands	Kai van Westering (53.84); Arno Kamminga (58.23); Nyls Korstanje (51.12); Stan Pijnenburg (48.04)	3:31.23	NR
3rd place, bronze medalist(s)	7	Italy	Michele Lamberti (54.28); Nicolò Martinenghi (57.97); Gianmarco Sansone (52.14); Alessandro Miressi (47.20)	3:31.59	
4	2	Canada	Blake Tierney (53.65)); James Dergousoff (59.89); Finlay Knox (51.60); Javier Acevedo (47.75)	3:32.89	
5	3	Spain	Hugo González (53.11); Carles Coll (1:00.88); Mario Molla Yanes (51.14); Sergio De Celis Montalban (48.07)	3:33.20	
6	1	Austria	Bernhard Reitshammer (54.72); Valentin Bayer (1:00.61); Simon Bucher (51.27); Heiko Gigler (48.02)	3:34.62	
7	8	Ireland	Conor Ferguson (54.46); Darragh Greene (1:00.20); Max McCusker (51.78); Shane Ryan (48.84)	3:35.28	
	6	Poland	Ksawery Masiuk (53.55); Jan Kałusowski; Jakub Majerski; Kamil Sieradzki	Disqualified	
