= Swimming at the 2024 World Aquatics Championships – Men's 100 metre backstroke =

Men's 100 metre backstroke at the 2024 World Aquatics Championships
- Venue: Aspire Dome
- Location: Doha, Qatar
- Dates: 12 February (heats and semifinals); 13 February (final)
- Competitors: 53 from 50 nations
- Winning time: 52.68

Medalists
gold medal	Hunter Armstrong	United States
silver medal	Hugo González	Spain
bronze medal	Apostolos Christou	Greece

The Men's 100 metre backstroke competition at the 2024 World Aquatics Championships was held on 12 and 13 February 2024.

== Qualification ==
Each National Federation was permitted to enter a maximum of two qualified athletes in each individual event, but only if both of them had attained the "A" standard qualification time at approved qualifying events. For this event, the "A" standard qualification time was 54.03 seconds. Federations could enter one athlete into the event if they met the "B" standard qualification time. For this event, the "B" standard qualification time was 55.92. Athletes could also enter the event if they had met an "A" or "B" standard in a different event and their Federation had not entered anyone else. Additional considerations applied to Federations who had few swimmers enter through the standard qualification times. Federations in this category could at least enter two men and two women into the competition, all of whom could enter into up to two events.

== Records ==
Prior to the competition, the existing world and championship records were as follows.

World record	Thomas Ceccon (ITA)	51.60	Budapest, Hungary	20 June 2022
Competition record	Thomas Ceccon (ITA)	51.60	Budapest, Hungary	20 June 2022

== Results ==
=== Heats ===
The heats were started on 12 February at 09:48.

Rank	Heat	Lane	Name	Nationality	Time	Notes
1	5	4	Pieter Coetze	South Africa	53.32	Q
2	6	1	Evangelos Makrygiannis	Greece	53.43	Q
3	4	3	Hugo González	Spain	53.61	Q
4	6	4	Hunter Armstrong	United States	53.66	Q
5	6	7	Michele Lamberti	Italy	53.73	Q
6	5	3	Bradley Woodward	Australia	53.76	Q
7	6	5	Apostolos Christou	Greece	53.79	Q
8	6	2	Lee Ju-ho	South Korea	53.81	Q
9	5	1	Kai van Westering	Netherlands	53.84	Q
10	6	6	Jack Aikins	United States	53.87	Q
11	4	7	Conor Ferguson	Ireland	53.95	Q
12	4	5	Roman Mityukov	Switzerland	54.10	Q
12	4	6	Ole Braunschweig	Germany	54.10	Q
14	5	5	Miroslav Knedla	Czech Republic	54.20	Q
15	4	2	Kacper Stokowski	Poland	54.23	Q
16	5	2	Oleksandr Zheltiakov	Ukraine	54.24	Q
17	4	4	Ksawery Masiuk	Poland	54.33	
18	4	1	Blake Tierney	Canada	54.46	
19	6	3	Ádám Jászo	Hungary	54.51	
20	5	7	Ulises Saravia	Argentina	54.60	
21	5	6	Andrew Jeffcoat	New Zealand	54.63	
22	6	8	Osamu Kato	Japan	54.70	
23	4	8	Luke Greenbank	Great Britain	54.93	
24	4	0	Gabriel Lopes	Portugal	55.08	
25	5	8	Denis-Laurean Popescu	Romania	55.33	
26	3	3	Kaloyan Levterov	Bulgaria	55.44	
26	3	6	Ziyad Saleem	Sudan	55.44	
26	6	0	Bernhard Reitshammer	Austria	55.44	
29	5	0	Erikas Grigaitis	Lithuania	55.48	
30	6	9	Yeziel Morales	Puerto Rico	55.50	
31	4	9	Girts Feldbergs	Latvia	56.02	
32	1	4	Remi Fabiani	Luxembourg	56.21	
33	3	5	Yegor Popov	Kazakhstan	56.59	
34	3	8	Denilson Cyprianos	Zimbabwe	56.82	
35	3	4	Jerard Jacinto	Philippines	57.18	
36	3	2	Charles Hockin	Paraguay	57.20	
37	3	7	Merdan Atayev	Turkmenistan	57.21	
37	5	9	Farrel Tangkas	Indonesia	57.21	
39	2	5	Anthony Piñeiro	Dominican Republic	57.41	
40	2	9	Akalanka Peiris	Sri Lanka	57.52	
41	3	0	Lau Shiu Yue	Hong Kong	57.76	
42	2	3	Alexis Kpade	Benin	58.03	
43	2	4	Ahmad Safie	Lebanon	58.32	
44	2	6	Dino Sirotanović	Bosnia and Herzegovina	58.81	
45	3	9	Guido Montero	Costa Rica	58.88	
46	2	2	Erkhes Enkhtur	Mongolia	58.89	
47	1	5	Samiul Rafi	Bangladesh	58.95	NR
48	3	1	Yazan Al-Bawwab	Palestine	59.31	
49	2	8	Zackary Gresham	Grenada	59.81	
50	2	1	Zeke Chan	Brunei	1:00.49	
51	2	0	Alan Uhi	Tonga	1:01.47	
52	1	3	Israel Poppe	Guam	1:02.83	
53	2	7	Oscar Peyre	Rwanda	1:03.56	

=== Semifinals ===
The semifinals were held on 12 February at 19:17.

Rank	Heat	Lane	Name	Nationality	Time	Notes
1	1	5	Hunter Armstrong	United States	53.04	Q
2	2	4	Pieter Coetze	South Africa	53.07	Q
3	2	5	Hugo González	Spain	53.22	Q
4	2	6	Apostolos Christou	Greece	53.62	Q
5	1	7	Roman Mityukov	Switzerland	53.64	Q
6	1	4	Evangelos Makrygiannis	Greece	53.67	Q
7	1	1	Miroslav Knedla	Czech Republic	53.70	Q
8	1	2	Jack Aikins	United States	53.72	Q
9	2	2	Kai van Westering	Netherlands	53.80	
10	1	6	Lee Ju-ho	South Korea	53.82	
11	2	1	Ole Braunschweig	Germany	53.89	
11	2	3	Michele Lamberti	Italy	53.89	
13	2	7	Conor Ferguson	Ireland	53.90	
14	2	8	Kacper Stokowski	Poland	54.03	
15	1	8	Oleksandr Zheltiakov	Ukraine	54.05	
16	1	3	Bradley Woodward	Australia	54.20	

=== Final ===
The final was held on 13 February at 19:59.

Rank	Lane	Name	Nationality	Time	Notes
1st place, gold medalist(s)	4	Hunter Armstrong	United States	52.68	
2nd place, silver medalist(s)	3	Hugo González	Spain	52.70	
3rd place, bronze medalist(s)	6	Apostolos Christou	Greece	53.36	
4	7	Evangelos Makrygiannis	Greece	53.38	
5	5	Pieter Coetze	South Africa	53.51	
6	2	Roman Mityukov	Switzerland	53.64	
7	1	Miroslav Knedla	Czech Republic	53.74	
8	8	Jack Aikins	United States	54.50	

== Sources ==
- "Competition Regulations" (PDF). World Aquatics. Archived (PDF) from the original on 15 February 2026.
