= Poland at the 2024 World Aquatics Championships =

- Flag of Poland
- FINA code: POL
- National federation: Polish Swimming Federation
- Website: polswim.pl (in Polish)

in Doha, Qatar
- Competitors: 30 in 3 sports
- Medals Ranked 30th: Gold 0 Silver 0 Bronze 3 Total 3

World Aquatics Championships appearances
- 1973; 1975; 1978; 1982; 1986; 1991; 1994; 1998; 2001; 2003; 2005; 2007; 2009; 2011; 2013; 2015; 2017; 2019; 2022; 2023; 2024

Poland competed at the 2024 World Aquatics Championships in Doha, Qatar from 2 to 18 February.

== Medalists ==
| Medal | Name | Sport | Event | Date |
|---|---|---|---|---|
| 3rd place, bronze medalist(s) | Jakub Majerski | Swimming | Men's 100 metre butterfly | 17 February 2024 |
| 3rd place, bronze medalist(s) | Ksawery Masiuk | Swimming | Men's 50 metre backstroke | 18 February 2024 |
| 3rd place, bronze medalist(s) | Katarzyna Wasick | Swimming | Women's 50 metre freestyle | 18 February 2024 |

== Competitors ==
The following is the list of competitors in the Championships.

| Sport | Men | Women | Total |
|---|---|---|---|
| Diving | 4 | 2 | 6 |
| Open water swimming | 2 | 0 | 2 |
| Swimming | 13 | 9 | 22 |
| Total | 19 | 11 | 30 |

== Diving ==
Men

| Athlete | Event | Preliminaries | | Semifinals | | Final | |
| Athlete | Event | Points | Rank | Points | Rank | Points | Rank |
|---|---|---|---|---|---|---|---|
| Kacper Lesiak | 3 m springboard | 299.70 | 44 | Did not advance | | | |
| Robert Łukaszewicz | 10 m platform | 372.25 | 15 Q | 406.80 | 12 Q | 387.55 | 11 |
| Andrzej Rzeszutek | 3 m springboard | 312.35 | 43 | Did not advance | | | |
| Kacper Lesiak; Andrzej Rzeszutek | 3 m synchro springboard | — | | | | 362.04 | 7 |
| Filip Jachim; Robert Łukaszewicz | 10 m synchro platform | — | | | | 338.82 | 12 |

Women

| Athlete | Event | Preliminaries | | Semifinals | | Final | |
| Athlete | Event | Points | Rank | Points | Rank | Points | Rank |
|---|---|---|---|---|---|---|---|
| Aleksandra Błażowska | 1 m springboard | 214.60 | 21 | — | | Did not advance | |
| Aleksandra Błażowska | 3 m springboard | 228.75 | 27 | Did not advance | | | |
| Kaja Skrzek | 1 m springboard | 225.55 | 19 | — | | Did not advance | |
| Kaja Skrzek | 3 m springboard | 214.70 | 40 | Did not advance | | | |

Mixed

| Athlete | Event | Final | |
| Athlete | Event | Points | Rank |
|---|---|---|---|
| Kacper Lesiak; Aleksandra Błażowska | 3 m synchro springboard | 252.30 | 11 |

== Open water swimming ==
Men

| Athlete | Event | Time | Rank |
|---|---|---|---|
| Bartosz Kapała | 5 km | 54:16.7 | 36 |
| Bartosz Kapała | 10 km | 1:53:47.4 | 41 |
| Piotr Woźniak | 5 km | 51:56.5 | 14 |
| Piotr Woźniak | 10 km | 1:49:45.5 | 20 |

== Swimming ==
Poland entered 22 swimmers.

Men

| Athlete | Event | Heat | | Semifinal | | Final | |
| Athlete | Event | Time | Rank | Time | Rank | Time | Rank |
|---|---|---|---|---|---|---|---|
| Michał Chmielewski | 200 metre butterfly | 1:56.83 | 10 Q | 1:55.38 | 3 Q | 1:55.36 | 4 |
| Krzysztof Chmielewski | 400 metre freestyle | 3:48.71 | 19 | — | | Did not advance | |
| Krzysztof Chmielewski | 1500 metre freestyle | 15:04.93 | 15 | — | | Did not advance | |
| Krzysztof Chmielewski | 200 metre butterfly | 1:56.37 | 5 Q | Disqualified | | Did not advance | |
| Adrian Jaśkiewicz | 100 metre butterfly | 52.31 | 13 Q | 52.28 | 15 | Did not advance | |
| Paweł Juraszek | 50 metre freestyle | 22.20 | 20 | Did not advance | | | |
| Jan Kałusowski | 50 metre breaststroke | 27.50 | 15 Q | 27.38 | 16 | Did not advance | |
| Jan Kałusowski | 100 metre breaststroke | 1:00.74 | 22 | Did not advance | | | |
| Jakub Majerski | 50 metre butterfly | 23.68 | 24 | Did not advance | | | |
| Jakub Majerski | 100 metre butterfly | 51.96 | 7 Q | 51.33 | 2 Q | 51.32 | 3rd place, bronze medalist(s) |
| Ksawery Masiuk | 50 metre backstroke | 24.58 | 1 Q | 24.46 | 3 Q | 24.44 =NR | 3rd place, bronze medalist(s) |
| Ksawery Masiuk | 100 metre backstroke | 54.33 | 17 | Did not advance | | | |
| Ksawery Masiuk | 200 metre backstroke | 1:58.20 | 6 Q | 1:57.48 | 10 | Did not advance | |
| Kamil Sieradzki | 100 metre freestyle | 48.93 | 16 Q | 48.80 | 15 | Did not advance | |
| Kamil Sieradzki | 200 metre freestyle | 1:47.25 | 13 Q | 1:47.33 | 14 | Did not advance | |
| Kacper Stokowski | 100 metre backstroke | 54.23 | 15 Q | 54.03 | 14 | Did not advance | |
| Kamil Sieradzki; Ksawery Masiuk; Mateusz Chowaniec; Kacper Majchrzak | 4 × 100 m freestyle relay | 3:15.71 | 10 | — | | Did not advance | |
| Kamil Sieradzki; Mateusz Chowaniec; Mikołaj Filipiak; Christian Sztolcman | 4 × 200 m freestyle relay | 7:14.98 | 11 | — | | Did not advance | |
| Ksawery Masiuk; Jan Kałusowski; Jakub Majerski; Kamil Sieradzki | 4 × 100 m medley relay | 3:33.79 | 4 Q | — | | Disqualified | |

Women

| Athlete | Event | Heat | | Semifinal | | Final | |
| Athlete | Event | Time | Rank | Time | Rank | Time | Rank |
|---|---|---|---|---|---|---|---|
| Laura Bernat | 200 metre backstroke | 2:11.51 | 7 Q | 2:10.00 | 6 Q | 2:09.92 | 5 |
| Zuzanna Famulok | 200 metre butterfly | 2:13.20 | 17 | Did not advance | | | |
| Zuzanna Famulok | 400 metre individual medley | 4:48.53 | 16 | — | | Did not advance | |
| Kornelia Fiedkiewicz | 50 metre freestyle | 24.85 | 8 Q | 24.71 | 7 Q | 24.69 | 7 |
| Kornelia Fiedkiewicz | 100 metre freestyle | 54.58 | 9 Q | 54.01 NR | 7 Q | 54.06 | 7 |
| Julia Maik | 50 metre butterfly | 26.75 | 20 | Did not advance | | | |
| Paulina Peda | 50 metre backstroke | 28.42 | 15 Q | 28.33 | 13 | Did not advance | |
| Paulina Peda | 100 metre backstroke | 1:01.87 | 18 | Did not advance | | | |
| Paulina Peda | 50 metre butterfly | 26.44 | 16 Q | 26.44 | 14 | Did not advance | |
| Paulina Peda | 100 metre butterfly | 59.47 | 17 | Did not advance | | | |
| Adela Piskorska | 50 metre backstroke | 28.16 | 6 Q | 28.06 | 6 Q | 28.09 | 6 |
| Adela Piskorska | 100 metre backstroke | 1:01.03 | 10 Q | 1:00.99 | 11 | Did not advance | |
| Adela Piskorska | 200 metre backstroke | 2:11.65 | 8 Q | 2:11.57 | 12 | Did not advance | |
| Aleksandra Polańska | 200 metre freestyle | 2:02.10 | 31 | Did not advance | | | |
| Dominika Sztandera | 50 metre breaststroke | 30.91 | 11 Q | 30.78 | 10 | Did not advance | |
| Dominika Sztandera | 100 metre breaststroke | 1:07.17 | 8 Q | 1:07.20 | 12 | Did not advance | |
| Katarzyna Wasick | 50 metre freestyle | 24.36 | 4 Q | 24.01 NR | 2 Q | 23.95 | 3rd place, bronze medalist(s) |
| Katarzyna Wasick; Kornelia Fiedkiewicz; Zuzanna Famulok; Julia Maik; Aleksandra Polańska | 4 × 100 metre freestyle relay | 3:41.43 | 5 Q | — | | 3:38.65 NR | 4 |
| Adela Piskorska; Dominika Sztandera; Paulina Peda; Kornelia Fiedkiewicz | 4 × 100 metre medley relay | 4:02.63 | 8 Q | — | | 4:01.73 | 7 |

Mixed

| Athlete | Event | Heat | | Semifinal | | Final | |
| Athlete | Event | Time | Rank | Time | Rank | Time | Rank |
|---|---|---|---|---|---|---|---|
| Ksawery Masiuk; Dominika Sztandera; Jakub Majerski; Katarzyna Wasick; Adrian Jaśkiewicz; Kornelia Fiedkiewicz | 4 × 100 m medley relay | 3:46.57 | 5 Q | — | | 3:46.04 | 4 |
