= Swimming at the 2024 World Aquatics Championships – Men's 50 metre backstroke =

Men's 50 metre backstroke at the Swimming at the 2024 World Aquatics Championships
- Venue: Aspire Dome
- Location: Doha, Qatar
- Dates: 17 February (heats and semifinal); 18 February (final)
- Competitors: 45 from 41 nations
- Winning time: 24.13

Medalists
gold medal	Isaac Cooper	Australia
silver medal	Hunter Armstrong	United States
bronze medal	Ksawery Masiuk	Poland

The Men's 50 metre backstroke competition at the 2024 World Aquatics Championships was held on 17 and 18 February 2024.

== Qualification ==
Each National Federation was permitted to enter a maximum of two qualified athletes in each individual event, but only if both of them had attained the "A" standard qualification time at approved qualifying events. For this event, the "A" standard qualification time was 25.16 seconds. Federations could enter one athlete into the event if they met the "B" standard qualification time. For this event, the "B" standard qualification time was 26.04. Athletes could also enter the event if they had met an "A" or "B" standard in a different event and their Federation had not entered anyone else. Additional considerations applied to Federations who had few swimmers enter through the standard qualification times. Federations in this category could at least enter two men and two women into the competition, all of whom could enter into up to two events.

== Records ==
Prior to the competition, the existing world and championship records were as follows.

World record	Kliment Kolesnikov (RUS)	23.55	Kazan, Russia	27 July 2023
Competition record	Liam Tancock (GBR)	24.04	Rome, Italy	2 August 2009

== Results ==
=== Heats ===
The heats were held on 17 February at 09:57.

Rank	Heat	Lane	Name	Nationality	Time	Notes
1	5	5	Ksawery Masiuk	Poland	24.58	Q
1	5	4	Hunter Armstrong	United States	24.66	Q
3	3	7	Hugo González	Spain	24.72	Q
4	3	4	Isaac Cooper	Australia	24.75	Q
4	4	4	Pieter Coetze	South Africa	24.75	Q
6	4	5	Michael Andrew	United States	24.82	Q
7	5	6	Michele Lamberti	Italy	24.88	Q
8	5	3	Ole Braunschweig	Germany	24.94	Q
9	5	7	Yoon Ji-hwan	South Korea	25.01	Q
10	3	2	Ulises Saravia	Argentina	25.02	Q
11	3	5	Apostolos Christou	Greece	25.03	Q
12	4	7	Björn Seeliger	Sweden	25.10	Q
13	4	3	Miroslav Knedla	Czech Republic	25.14	Q
14	5	8	Adrian Santos	Spain	25.15	Q
15	3	3	Andrew Jeffcoat	New Zealand	25.16	Q
16	3	1	Evangelos Makrygiannis	Greece	25.18	Q
17	3	6	Javier Acevedo	Canada	25.28	
18	4	1	Bradley Woodward	Australia	25.41	
19	2	4	Ádám Jászó	Hungary	25.43	
20	5	2	Oleksandr Zheltiakov	Ukraine	25.60	
21	5	1	Lamar Taylor	Bahamas	25.80	
22	2	7	Dimuth Peiris	Sri Lanka	25.86	
23	5	0	Jerard Jacinto	Philippines	25.92	
24	5	9	Diego Camacho	Mexico	25.97	
25	3	9	Dino Hasibović	Bosnia and Herzegovina	26.06	
25	4	8	I Gede Siman Sudartawa	Indonesia	26.06	
27	2	6	Ģirts Feldbergs	Latvia	26.08	
28	3	8	Yeziel Morales	Puerto Rico	26.17	
29	2	3	Kaloyan Levterov	Bulgaria	26.25	
29	2	8	Merdan Ataýew	Turkmenistan	26.25	
31	4	9	Bernhard Reitshammer	Austria	26.33	
32	4	6	Andrei-Mircea Anghel	Romania	26.36	
33	2	2	Xu Yifan	China	26.37	
34	2	5	Filippos Iakovidis	Cyprus	26.43	
35	4	0	Charles Hockin	Paraguay	26.45	
36	2	9	Erkhes Enkhtur	Mongolia	26.72	
37	2	1	Lau Shiu Yue	Hong Kong	26.74	
38	1	4	Guido Montero	Costa Rica	27.71	
39	1	5	Oscar Peyre	Rwanda	27.79	
40	2	0	Antoine De Lapparent	Cambodia	27.93	
41	1	6	Tajhari Williams	Turks and Caicos Islands	28.78	
42	1	3	Hasan Al-Zinkee	Iraq	28.97	
43	1	1	Brandon George	Saint Vincent and the Grenadines	29.16	
44	1	2	Giorgio Nguichie	Cameroon	33.95	
	1	7	Ibrahim Kamara	Sierra Leone	Did not start	
	1	8	Yousef Al-Khulaifi	Qatar	Did not start	
	4	2	Conor Ferguson	Ireland	Did not start	
	3	0	Mantas Kauspedas	Lithuania	Disqualified	

=== Semifinals ===
The semifinals were held on 17 February at 20:06.

Rank	Heat	Lane	Name	Nationality	Time	Notes
1	1	5	Isaac Cooper	Australia	24.12	Q, OC
2	1	4	Hunter Armstrong	United States	24.43	Q
3	2	3	Pieter Coetze	South Africa	24.46	Q
3	2	4	Ksawery Masiuk	Poland	24.46	Q
5	2	5	Hugo González	Spain	24.60	Q
6	2	6	Michele Lamberti	Italy	24.68	Q
7	1	3	Michael Andrew	United States	24.70	Q
8	1	6	Ole Braunschweig	Germany	24.74	Q
9	1	8	Evangelos Makrygiannis	Greece	24.84	
10	2	8	Andrew Jeffcoat	New Zealand	24.88	
11	2	7	Apostolos Christou	Greece	25.01	
12	2	1	Miroslav Knedla	Czech Republic	25.06	
13	1	1	Adrian Santos	Spain	25.09	
14	1	7	Björn Seeliger	Sweden	25.10	
15	1	2	Ulises Saravia	Argentina	25.13	
16	2	2	Yoon Ji-hwan	South Korea	25.14	

=== Final ===
The final was held on 18 February at 19:02.

Rank	Lane	Name	Nationality	Time	Notes
1st place, gold medalist(s)	4	Isaac Cooper	Australia	24.13	
2nd place, silver medalist(s)	5	Hunter Armstrong	United States	24.33	
3rd place, bronze medalist(s)	6	Ksawery Masiuk	Poland	24.44	=NR
4	3	Pieter Coetze	South Africa	24.59	
5	8	Ole Braunschweig	Germany	24.74	
6	2	Hugo González	Spain	24.77	
7	7	Michele Lamberti	Italy	24.82	
8	1	Michael Andrew	United States	24.86	

== Sources ==
- "Competition Regulations" (PDF). World Aquatics. Archived (PDF) from the original on 15 February 2026.
