= Diving at the 2024 World Aquatics Championships – Mixed synchronized 3 metre springboard =

Mixed synchronized 3 metre springboard at the 2024 World Aquatics Championships
- Venue: Hamad Aquatic Centre
- Location: Doha, Qatar
- Dates: 10 February
- Competitors: 34 from 17 nations
- Teams: 17
- Winning points: 287.49

Medalists
| gold medal | Domonic Bedggood; Maddison Keeney | Australia |
| silver medal | Matteo Santoro; Chiara Pellacani | Italy |
| bronze medal | Yi Jae-gyeong; Kim Su-ji | South Korea |

The Mixed synchronized 3 metre springboard competition at the 2024 World Aquatics Championships was held on 10 February 2024.

== Results ==
The event was started at 13:32.

| Rank | Nation | Divers | Points |
|---|---|---|---|
| 1st place, gold medalist(s) | Australia | Domonic Bedggood; Maddison Keeney | 300.93 |
| 2nd place, silver medalist(s) | Italy | Matteo Santoro; Chiara Pellacani | 287.49 |
| 3rd place, bronze medalist(s) | South Korea | Yi Jae-gyeong; Kim Su-ji | 285.03 |
| 4 | Great Britain | Ross Haslam; Grace Reid | 278.28 |
| 5 | Mexico | Jahir Ocampo; Paola Pineda | 275.31 |
| 6 | Sweden | Elias Petersen; Emilia Nilsson Garip | 267.39 |
| 7 | United States | Noah Duperre; Bridget O'Neil | 262.17 |
| 8 | France | Gwendal Bisch; Naïs Gillet | 260.85 |
| 9 | Germany | Alexander Lube; Jana Rother | 257.64 |
| 10 | New Zealand | Liam Stone; Elizabeth Roussel | 252.66 |
| 11 | Poland | Kacper Lesiak; Aleksandra Błażowska | 252.30 |
| 12 | Ireland | Jake Passmore; Clare Cryan | 249.12 |
| 13 | Ukraine | Kyrylo Azarov; Hanna Pysmenska | 235.50 |
| 14 | Indonesia | Andriyan Andriyan; Gladies Lariesa Garina Haga | 207.00 |
| 15 | Dominican Republic | José Calderón; Victoria Garza | 198.12 |
| 16 | Georgia | Giorgi Tsulukidze; Tekle Sharia | 198.72 |
| 17 | Macau | He Heung Wing; Zhao Hang U | 166.17 |
