= Swimming at the 2024 World Aquatics Championships – Women's 50 metre backstroke =

Women's 50 metre backstroke at the Swimming at the 2024 World Aquatics Championships
- Venue: Aspire Dome
- Location: Doha, Qatar
- Dates: 14 February (heats and semifinals); 15 February (final)
- Competitors: 55 from 51 nations
- Winning time: 27.43

Medalists
| gold medal | Claire Curzan | United States |
| silver medal | Iona Anderson | Australia |
| bronze medal | Ingrid Wilm | Canada |

The Women's 50 metre backstroke competition at the 2024 World Aquatics Championships was held on 14 and 15 February 2024.

== Qualification ==
Each National Federation was permitted to enter a maximum of two qualified athletes in each individual event, but only if both of them had attained the "A" standard qualification time at approved qualifying events. For this event, the "A" standard qualification time was 28.22 seconds. Federations could enter one athlete into the event if they met the "B" standard qualification time. For this event, the "B" standard qualification time was 29.21. Athletes could also enter the event if they had met an "A" or "B" standard in a different event and their Federation had not entered anyone else. Additional considerations applied to Federations who had few swimmers enter through the standard qualification times. Federations in this category could at least enter two men and two women into the competition, all of whom could enter into up to two events.

== Records ==
Prior to the competition, the existing world and championship records were as follows.

| World record | Kaylee McKeown (AUS) | 26.86 | Budapest, Hungary | 20 October 2023 |
| Competition record | Zhao Jing (CHN) | 27.06 | Rome, Italy | 30 July 2009 |

== Results ==
=== Heats ===
The heats were started on 14 February at 09:32.

| Rank | Heat | Lane | Name | Nationality | Time | Notes |
|---|---|---|---|---|---|---|
| 1 | 5 | 4 | Ingrid Wilm | Canada | 27.81 | Q |
| 2 | 6 | 4 | Lauren Cox | Great Britain | 27.89 | Q |
| 3 | 6 | 2 | Claire Curzan | United States | 27.99 | Q |
| 4 | 5 | 3 | Iona Anderson | Australia | 28.02 | Q |
| 5 | 6 | 5 | Theodora Drakou | Greece | 28.09 | Q |
| 6 | 4 | 4 | Adela Piskorska | Poland | 28.16 | Q |
| 7 | 5 | 7 | Stephanie Au | Hong Kong | 28.27 | Q |
| 8 | 5 | 6 | Costanza Cocconcelli | Italy | 28.28 | Q |
| 9 | 4 | 3 | Kira Toussaint | Netherlands | 28.33 | Q |
| 10 | 5 | 8 | Emma Harvey | Bermuda | 28.34 | Q, NR |
| 11 | 4 | 5 | Jaclyn Barclay | Australia | 28.36 | Q |
| 12 | 6 | 8 | Tayla Jonker | South Africa | 28.37 | Q, NR |
| 13 | 5 | 2 | Louise Hansson | Sweden | 28.38 | Q |
| 14 | 5 | 5 | Maaike de Waard | Netherlands | 28.39 | Q |
| 15 | 4 | 6 | Paulina Peda | Poland | 28.42 | Q |
| 16 | 6 | 6 | Kathleen Dawson | Great Britain | 28.46 | Q |
| 17 | 6 | 0 | Barbora Janíčková | Czech Republic | 28.65 | |
| 18 | 4 | 2 | Chen Jie | China | 28.67 | |
| 19 | 4 | 7 | Carmen Weiler | Spain | 28.68 | |
| 20 | 6 | 7 | Andrea Berrino | Argentina | 28.70 | |
| 21 | 6 | 1 | Tayde Sansores | Mexico | 28.76 | |
| 22 | 3 | 7 | Teresa Ivan | Slovakia | 28.90 | |
| 23 | 5 | 9 | Kim Seung-won | South Korea | 28.96 | |
| 24 | 6 | 3 | Roos Vanotterdijk | Belgium | 28.98 | |
| 25 | 6 | 9 | Nina Stanisavljević | Serbia | 29.00 | |
| 26 | 3 | 4 | Maria Godden | Ireland | 29.13 | |
| 27 | 5 | 1 | Camila Rebelo | Portugal | 29.19 | |
| 28 | 4 | 9 | Saovanee Boonamphai | Thailand | 29.22 | |
| 29 | 4 | 0 | Levenia Sim | Singapore | 29.35 | |
| 30 | 4 | 1 | Xeniya Ignatova | Kazakhstan | 29.40 | |
| 31 | 4 | 8 | Fanny Teijonsalo | Finland | 29.41 | |
| 32 | 3 | 8 | Donata Katai | Zimbabwe | 29.52 | |
| 33 | 3 | 3 | Anastasiya Shkurdai | | 29.58 | |
| 34 | 3 | 9 | Mia Phiri | Zambia | 29.61 | |
| 35 | 5 | 0 | Masniari Wolf | Indonesia | 29.80 | |
| 36 | 3 | 5 | Patricija Geriksonaitė | Lithuania | 29.88 | |
| 37 | 3 | 6 | Abril Aunchayna | Uruguay | 30.21 | |
| 38 | 3 | 1 | Suvana Chetana | India | 30.23 | |
| 39 | 3 | 0 | Ariuntamir Enkh-Amgalan | Mongolia | 30.32 | |
| 40 | 2 | 4 | Jessica Humphrey | Namibia | 30.43 | |
| 41 | 2 | 5 | Eda Zeqiri | Kosovo | 30.69 | |
| 42 | 2 | 3 | Gaurika Singh | Nepal | 30.80 | NR |
| 43 | 3 | 2 | Wu Yi-en | Chinese Taipei | 31.11 | |
| 44 | 2 | 6 | Chanchakriya Kheun | Cambodia | 31.18 | |
| 45 | 1 | 1 | Aaliyah Palestrini | Seychelles | 32.07 | |
| 46 | 2 | 8 | Carolann Faeamani | Tonga | 32.13 | |
| 47 | 2 | 7 | Denise Donelli | Mozambique | 32.21 | |
| 48 | 2 | 2 | Noor Yusuf | Bahrain | 32.39 | |
| 49 | 1 | 7 | Maleek Almukthar | Libya | 32.41 | |
| 50 | 2 | 1 | Idealy Tendrinavalona | Madagascar | 32.44 | |
| 51 | 2 | 0 | Jennifer Harding-Marlin | Saint Kitts and Nevis | 35.29 | |
| 52 | 2 | 9 | Tayamika Changanamuno | Malawi | 36.40 | |
| 53 | 1 | 5 | Kamila Ibrahim | Comoros | 40.21 | |
| 54 | 1 | 4 | Aïchata Diabaté | Mali | 52.22 | |
| 55 | 1 | 6 | Assita Diarra | Ivory Coast | 58.14 | |
| | 1 | 2 | Hearmela Melke | Eritrea | Did not start | |
| | 1 | 3 | Yaba Kamara | Sierra Leone | Did not start | |

=== Semifinals ===
The semifinals were started on 14 February at 19:36.

| Rank | Heat | Lane | Name | Nationality | Time | Notes |
|---|---|---|---|---|---|---|
| 1 | 1 | 5 | Iona Anderson | Australia | 27.51 | Q |
| 2 | 1 | 4 | Lauren Cox | Great Britain | 27.55 | Q |
| 3 | 2 | 5 | Claire Curzan | United States | 27.65 | Q |
| 4 | 2 | 4 | Ingrid Wilm | Canada | 27.68 | Q |
| 5 | 2 | 3 | Theodora Drakou | Greece | 28.00 | Q |
| 6 | 1 | 3 | Adela Piskorska | Poland | 28.06 | Q |
| 7 | 2 | 1 | Louise Hansson | Sweden | 28.13 | Q |
| 7 | 2 | 2 | Kira Toussaint | Netherlands | 28.13 | Q |
| 9 | 1 | 1 | Maaike de Waard | Netherlands | 28.14 | |
| 9 | 1 | 6 | Costanza Cocconcelli | Italy | 28.14 | |
| 11 | 2 | 7 | Jaclyn Barclay | Australia | 28.17 | |
| 12 | 1 | 8 | Kathleen Dawson | Great Britain | 28.22 | |
| 13 | 2 | 8 | Paulina Peda | Poland | 28.33 | |
| 14 | 1 | 2 | Emma Harvey | Bermuda | 28.47 | |
| 15 | 1 | 7 | Tayla Jonker | South Africa | 28.48 | |
| 15 | 2 | 6 | Stephanie Au | Hong Kong | 28.48 | |

==== Swim-off ====
The swim-off was started on 14 February at 21:14.

| Rank | Lane | Name | Nationality | Time | Notes |
|---|---|---|---|---|---|
| 1 | 4 | Maaike de Waard | Netherlands | 27.89 | |
| 2 | 5 | Costanza Cocconcelli | Italy | 28.24 | |

=== Final ===
The final was held on 15 February at 19:36.

| Rank | Lane | Name | Nationality | Time | Notes |
|---|---|---|---|---|---|
| 1st place, gold medalist(s) | 3 | Claire Curzan | United States | 27.43 | |
| 2nd place, silver medalist(s) | 4 | Iona Anderson | Australia | 27.45 | |
| 3rd place, bronze medalist(s) | 6 | Ingrid Wilm | Canada | 27.61 | |
| 4 | 5 | Lauren Cox | Great Britain | 27.65 | |
| 5 | 2 | Theodora Drakou | Greece | 27.84 | NR |
| 6 | 7 | Adela Piskorska | Poland | 28.09 | |
| 7 | 8 | Kira Toussaint | Netherlands | 28.18 | |
| 8 | 1 | Louise Hansson | Sweden | 28.32 | |

== Sources ==
- "Competition Regulations" (PDF). World Aquatics. Archived (PDF) from the original on 15 February 2026.
