= Switzerland at the 2024 World Aquatics Championships =

- Flag of Switzerland
- FINA code: SUI
- National federation: Swiss Swimming Federation

in Doha, Qatar
- Competitors: 13 in 4 sports
- Medals Ranked 27th: Gold 0 Silver 1 Bronze 0 Total 1

World Aquatics Championships appearances
- 1973; 1975; 1978; 1982; 1986; 1991; 1994; 1998; 2001; 2003; 2005; 2007; 2009; 2011; 2013; 2015; 2017; 2019; 2022; 2023; 2024

Switzerland competed at the 2024 World Aquatics Championships in Doha, Qatar from 2 to 18 February.

== Medalists ==
Medal	Name	Sport	Event	Date
2nd place, silver medalist(s)	Roman Mityukov	Swimming	Men's 200 metre backstroke	16 February 2024

== Competitors ==
The following is the list of competitors in the Championships.

Sport	Men	Women	Total
Diving	2	2	4
High diving	2	1	3
Open water swimming	1	0	1
Swimming	4	1	5
Total	9	4	13

== Diving ==
Men

Athlete	Event	Preliminaries		Semifinals		Final	
Athlete	Event	Points	Rank	Points	Rank	Points	Rank
Guillaume Dutoit	3 m springboard	283.70	49	Did not advance			
Jonathan Suckow	3 m springboard	332.45	35	Did not advance			
Guillaume Dutoit; Jonathan Suckow	3 m synchro springboard	—				344.37	10

Women

Athlete	Event	Preliminaries		Semifinals		Final	
Athlete	Event	Points	Rank	Points	Rank	Points	Rank
Madeline Coquoz	1 m springboard	207.35	25	—		Did not advance	
Madeline Coquoz	3 m springboard	225.90	30	Did not advance			
Michelle Heimberg	1 m springboard	230.95	12 Q	—		248.50	9
Michelle Heimberg	3 m springboard	224.40	33	Did not advance			

== High diving ==
Athlete	Event	Points	Rank
Jean-David Duval	Men's high diving	204.50	24
Pierrick Schafer	Men's high diving	287.20	15
Matthias Appenzeller	Men's high diving	Withdrawn	
Morgane Herculano	Women's high diving	257.90	11

== Open water swimming ==
Men

Athlete	Event	Time	Rank
Christian Schreiber	5 km	53:22.0	19
Christian Schreiber	10 km	1:53:48.0	42

== Swimming ==
Switzerland entered 5 swimmers.

Men

Athlete	Event	Heat		Semifinal		Final	
Athlete	Event	Time	Rank	Time	Rank	Time	Rank
Jérémy Desplanches	100 metre breaststroke	1:00.90	26	Did not advance			
Jérémy Desplanches	200 metre individual medley	1:58.17	1 Q	1:59.08	9	Did not advance	
Antonio Djakovic	200 metre freestyle	1:47.67	25	Did not advance			
Antonio Djakovic	400 metre freestyle	3:47.81	15	—		Did not advance	
Antonio Djakovic	800 metre freestyle	Did not start		—		Did not advance	
Roman Mityukov	100 metre backstroke	54.10	12 Q	53.64	5 Q	53.64	6
Roman Mityukov	200 metre backstroke	1:58.03	4 Q	1:56.72	5 Q	1:55.40	2nd place, silver medalist(s)
Marius Toscan	200 metre butterfly	1:58.99	21	Did not advance			
Marius Toscan	400 metre individual medley	4:19.24	11	—		Did not advance	

Women

Athlete	Event	Heat		Semifinal		Final	
Athlete	Event	Time	Rank	Time	Rank	Time	Rank
Lisa Mamié	50 metre breaststroke	32.88	32	Did not advance			
Lisa Mamié	100 metre breaststroke	1:07.75	16 Q	1:07.48	14	Did not advance	
Lisa Mamié	200 metre breaststroke	2:27.42	11 Q	2:24.62	5 Q	2:26.23	8
