= Swimming at the 2024 World Aquatics Championships – Women's 100 metre breaststroke =

Women's 100 metre breaststroke at the 2024 World Aquatics Championships
- Venue: Aspire Dome
- Location: Doha, Qatar
- Dates: 12 February (heats and semifinal); 13 February (final)
- Competitors: 53 from 50 nations
- Winning time: 1:05.27

Medalists
gold medal	Tang Qianting	China
silver medal	Tes Schouten	Netherlands
bronze medal	Siobhán Haughey	Hong Kong

The Women's 100 metre breaststroke competition at the 2024 World Aquatics Championships was held on 12 and 13 February 2024.

== Qualification ==
Each National Federation was permitted to enter a maximum of two qualified athletes in each individual event, but only if both of them had attained the "A" standard qualification time at approved qualifying events. For this event, the "A" standard qualification time was 1:07.35. Federations could enter one athlete into the event if they met the "B" standard qualification time. For this event, the "B" standard qualification time was 1:09.71. Athletes could also enter the event if they had met an "A" or "B" standard in a different event and their Federation had not entered anyone else. Additional considerations applied to Federations who had few swimmers enter through the standard qualification times. Federations in this category could at least enter two men and two women into the competition, all of whom could enter into up to two events.

== Records ==
Prior to the competition, the existing world and championship records were as follows.

World record	Lilly King (USA)	1:04.13	Budapest, Hungary	25 July 2017
Competition record	Lilly King (USA)	1:04.13	Budapest, Hungary	25 July 2017

== Results ==
=== Heats ===
The heats were started on 12 February at 10:04.

Rank	Heat	Lane	Name	Nationality	Time	Notes
1	5	7	Tang Qianting	China	1:06.16	Q
2	4	4	Tes Schouten	Netherlands	1:06.46	Q
3	5	4	Mona McSharry	Ireland	1:06.49	Q
4	6	7	Alina Zmushka	Neutral Independent Athletes	1:06.77	Q
5	5	3	Yang Chang	China	1:06.80	Q
6	6	2	Kotryna Teterevkova	Lithuania	1:06.85	Q
7	6	3	Letitia Sim	Singapore	1:06.97	Q
8	6	6	Dominika Sztandera	Poland	1:07.17	Q
9	4	5	Sophie Hansson	Sweden	1:07.19	Q
10	6	5	Benedetta Pilato	Italy	1:07.24	Q
11	5	1	Sophie Angus	Canada	1:07.37	Q
12	5	5	Siobhán Haughey	Hong Kong	1:07.41	Q
13	4	3	Arianna Castiglioni	Italy	1:07.48	Q
14	4	6	Macarena Ceballos	Argentina	1:07.61	Q
14	5	6	Lara van Niekerk	South Africa	1:07.61	Q
16	4	2	Lisa Mamié	Switzerland	1:07.75	Q
17	6	4	Rūta Meilutytė	Lithuania	1:07.79	
18	6	1	Piper Enge	United States	1:08.14	
19	4	1	Ida Hulkko	Finland	1:08.21	
20	6	8	Stefanía Gómez	Colombia	1:08.67	
21	4	7	Jimena Ruiz	Spain	1:08.74	
22	4	0	Ana Blažević	Croatia	1:08.88	
23	4	8	Melissa Rodríguez	Mexico	1:08.91	
24	3	5	Kristýna Horská	Czech Republic	1:08.95	
25	5	2	Abbey Harkin	Australia	1:09.01	
26	3	8	Thanya Dela Cruz	Philippines	1:09.12	
27	5	8	Ana Rodrigues	Portugal	1:09.82	
28	3	4	Moon Su-a	South Korea	1:09.93	
29	3	3	Emily Santos	Panama	1:09.96	
30	3	2	Adelaida Pchelintseva	Kazakhstan	1:10.16	
31	5	9	Silje Slyngstadli	Norway	1:10.42	
32	6	0	Lin Pei-wun	Chinese Taipei	1:10.77	
33	5	0	Ana Carolina Vieira	Brazil	1:10.83	
34	3	0	Lanihei Connolly	Cook Islands	1:10.87	
35	3	6	Phee Jinq En	Malaysia	1:11.31	
36	6	9	Tara Vovk	Slovenia	1:11.81	
37	3	1	Chen Pui Lam	Macau	1:12.08	
38	2	4	Rhanishka Gibbs	Bahamas	1:12.27	
39	3	7	Nicole Frank	Uruguay	1:12.81	
40	2	2	Marina Abu Shamaleh	Palestine	1:14.15	
41	1	6	Tessa Ip Hen Cheung	Mauritius	1:14.25	
42	3	9	Imane El Barodi	Morocco	1:14.55	
43	2	3	Ellie Shaw	Antigua and Barbuda	1:15.20	
44	2	5	Kelera Mudunasoko	Fiji	1:15.64	
45	2	6	Tara Aloul	Jordan	1:15.87	
46	2	7	Naiara Roca	Bolivia	1:16.41	
47	2	1	Lara Dashti	Kuwait	1:18.83	
48	2	8	Maria Battalones	Northern Mariana Islands	1:19.79	
49	1	5	Hayley Wong	Brunei	1:20.28	
50	2	0	Makelyta Singsombath	Laos	1:23.98	
51	2	9	Taeyanna Adams	Federated States of Micronesia	1:24.70	
52	1	3	Troya Pina	Cape Verde	1:25.17	
53	1	4	Mariama Touré	Guinea	1:37.98	
	4	9	Martina Bukvić	Serbia	Did not start	

=== Semifinals ===
The semifinals were held on 12 February at 19:28.

Rank	Heat	Lane	Name	Nationality	Time	Notes
1	2	4	Tang Qianting	China	1:05.36	Q
2	2	5	Mona McSharry	Ireland	1:06.11	Q
3	2	3	Yang Chang	China	1:06.27	Q
4	1	4	Tes Schouten	Netherlands	1:06.30	Q
5	1	7	Siobhán Haughey	Hong Kong	1:06.41	Q
6	1	5	Alina Zmushka	Neutral Independent Athletes	1:06.53	Q
7	1	3	Kotryna Teterevkova	Lithuania	1:06.61	Q
8	2	7	Sophie Angus	Canada	1:06.66	Q
9	1	2	Benedetta Pilato	Italy	1:06.70	
10	2	2	Sophie Hansson	Sweden	1:06.78	
11	2	6	Letitia Sim	Singapore	1:07.14	
12	1	6	Dominika Sztandera	Poland	1:07.20	
13	2	8	Lara van Niekerk	South Africa	1:07.25	
14	1	8	Lisa Mamié	Switzerland	1:07.48	
15	1	1	Macarena Ceballos	Argentina	1:07.49	
16	2	1	Arianna Castogiloni	Italy	1:07.57	

=== Final ===
The final was held on 13 February at 20:45.

Rank	Lane	Name	Nationality	Time	Notes
1st place, gold medalist(s)	4	Tang Qianting	China	1:05.27	NR
2nd place, silver medalist(s)	6	Tes Schouten	Netherlands	1:05.82	
3rd place, bronze medalist(s)	2	Siobhán Haughey	Hong Kong	1:05.92	NR
4	1	Kotryna Teterevkova	Lithuania	1:06.02	
5	5	Mona McSharry	Ireland	1:06.42	
6	7	Alina Zmushka	Neutral Independent Athletes	1:06.58	
7	3	Yang Chang	China	1:06.75	
8	8	Sophie Angus	Canada	1:07.09	

== Sources ==
- "Competition Regulations" (PDF). World Aquatics. Archived (PDF) from the original on 15 February 2026.
