= New Zealand at the 2024 World Aquatics Championships =

- Flag of New Zealand
- FINA code: NZL
- National federation: Swimming New Zealand
- Website: swimmingnz.org

in Doha, Qatar
- Competitors: 33 in 5 sports
- Medals Ranked =9th: Gold 2 Silver 1 Bronze 1 Total 4

World Aquatics Championships appearances
- 1973; 1975; 1978; 1982; 1986; 1991; 1994; 1998; 2001; 2003; 2005; 2007; 2009; 2011; 2013; 2015; 2017; 2019; 2022; 2023; 2024

New Zealand competed at the 2024 World Aquatics Championships in Doha, Qatar from 2 to 18 February.

== Medalists ==
Medal	Name	Sport	Event	Date
1st place, gold medalist(s)	Erika Fairweather	Swimming	Women's 400 m freestyle	February 11
1st place, gold medalist(s)	Lewis Clareburt	Swimming	Men's 400 m individual medley	February 18
2nd place, silver medalist(s)	Erika Fairweather	Swimming	Women's 200 m freestyle	February 14
3rd place, bronze medalist(s)	Erika Fairweather	Swimming	Women's 800 m freestyle	February 17

== Athletes by discipline ==
The following is the list of number of competitors who participated at the Championships per discipline.

Sport	Men	Women	Total
Artistic swimming	0	3	3
Diving	5	2	7
High diving	1	0	1
Swimming	3	5	8
Water polo	0	14	14
Total	9	24	33

== Artistic swimming ==
New Zealand entered 3 artistic swimmers.

Women

Athlete	Event	Preliminaries		Final	
Athlete	Event	Points	Rank	Points	Rank
Nina Brown; Eva Morris	Duet technical routine	175.5834	36	Did not advance	
Nina Brown; Eva Morris	Duet free routine	116.8854	33	Did not advance	
Jennifer Russanov	Solo technical routine	187.1066	21	Did not advance	
Jennifer Russanov	Solo free routine	163.4624	20	Did not advance	

== Diving ==
New Zealand entered 7 divers.

Men

Athlete	Event	Preliminaries		Semifinal		Final	
Athlete	Event	Points	Rank	Points	Rank	Points	Rank
Liam Stone	3 m springboard	344.30	26	Did not advance			
Frazer Tavener	3 m springboard	338.55	32	Did not advance			
Nathan Brown	10 m platform	331.10	29	Did not advance			
Luke Sipkes	10 m platform	252.00	42	Did not advance			
Liam Stone; Frazer Tavener	3 m synchronized springboard	—				319.38	18
Arno Lee; Luke Sipkes	10 m synchronized platform	—				269.64	20

Women

Athlete	Event	Preliminaries		Semifinal		Final	
Athlete	Event	Points	Rank	Points	Rank	Points	Rank
Mikali Dawson	10 m platform	237.80	27	Did not advance			
Elizabeth Roussel	1 m springboard	205.10	27	—		Did not advance	
Elizabeth Roussel	3 m springboard	243.00	21	Did not advance			

Mixed

Athlete	Event	Final	
Athlete	Event	Points	Rank
Liam Stone; Elizabeth Roussel	3 m synchronized springboard	252.66	10
Mikali Dawson; Elizabeth Roussel; Nathan Brown; Frazer Tavener	Team event	306.40	9

== High diving ==
New Zealand entered 1 male high diver.

Athlete	Event	Points	Rank
Braden Rumpit	Men's high diving	302.20	14

== Swimming ==
New Zealand entered 8 swimmers.

Men

Athlete	Event	Heat		Semifinal		Final	
Athlete	Event	Time	Rank	Time	Rank	Time	Rank
Lewis Clareburt	200 metre butterfly	1:56.10	2 Q	1:55.82	6 Q	1:55.86	7
Lewis Clareburt	200 metre individual medley	2:00.37	11 Q	1:58.59	7 Q	1:58.66	7
Lewis Clareburt	400 metre individual medley	4:13.61	5 Q	—		4:09.72	1st place, gold medalist(s)
Cameron Gray	50 metre freestyle	22.84	38	Did not advance			
Cameron Gray	100 metre freestyle	48.81	13 Q	48.73	14	Did not advance	
Cameron Gray	50 metre butterfly	23.62	20	Did not advance			
Cameron Gray	100 metre butterfly	Did not start		Did not advance			
Andrew Jeffcoat	50 metre backstroke	25.16	15 Q	24.88	10	Did not advance	
Andrew Jeffcoat	100 metre backstroke	54.63	21	Did not advance			
Andrew Jeffcoat	200 metre backstroke	Did not start		Did not advance			

Women

Athlete	Event	Heat		Semifinal		Final	
Athlete	Event	Time	Rank	Time	Rank	Time	Rank
Caitlin Deans	1500 metre freestyle	16:17.98	10	—		Did not advance	
Erika Fairweather	200 metre freestyle	1:57.40	2 Q	1:55.75	1 Q	1:55.77	2nd place, silver medalist(s)
Erika Fairweather	400 metre freestyle	4:04.70	2 Q	—		3:59.44	1st place, gold medalist(s)
Erika Fairweather	800 metre freestyle	8:28.15	3 Q	—		8:22.26	3rd place, bronze medalist(s)
Eve Thomas	400 metre freestyle	4:06.12	5 Q	—		4:05.87	7
Eve Thomas	800 metre freestyle	8:29.30	4 Q	—		8:24.86	4
Eve Thomas	1500 metre freestyle	16:16.43	7 Q	—		16:09.43	4
Erika Fairweather; Laticia Transom; Eve Thomas; Caitlin Deans; Summer Osborne (heat)	4 × 200 m freestyle relay	7:54.97	2 Q	—		7:53.02	5

== Water polo ==
Summary

Team	Event	Group stage				Playoff	Quarterfinal	Semifinal	Final / BM	
Team	Event	Opposition Score	Opposition Score	Opposition Score	Rank	Opposition Score	Opposition Score	Opposition Score	Opposition Score	Rank
New Zealand	Women's tournament	Hungary; L 8–19	Australia; L 6–13	Singapore; W 30–4	3 QP	Canada; L 12–14	—	Kazakhstan; W 23–8	China; W 16–15	9

=== Women's tournament ===
Team roster

The following is the New Zealand roster.

Head coach: Angela Winstanley-Smith

- 1 Jessica Milicich GK
- 2 Emily Nicholson FP
- 3 Bernadette Doyle FP
- 4 Libby Gault FP
- 5 Gabrielle Milicich FP
- 6 Morgan McDowall FP
- 7 Emmerson Houghton FP
- 8 Katie McKenty FP
- 9 Isabelle Jackson FP
- 10 Kaitlin Howarth FP
- 11 Kate Henderson FP
- 12 Gabriella MacDonald FP
- 13 Bridget Layburn GK
- 14 Gabrielle Doyle FP

Group play

Pos	Team	Pld	W	PSW	PSL	L	GF	GA	GD	Pts	Qualification
1	Hungary	3	3	0	0	0	71	19	+52	9	Quarterfinals
2	Australia	3	2	0	0	1	54	20	+34	6	Playoffs
3	New Zealand	3	1	0	0	2	44	36	+8	3	Playoffs
4	Singapore	3	0	0	0	3	7	101	−94	0	13–16th place semifinals

Source: World Aquatics
Rules for classification: 1) points; 2) head-to-head points; 3) head-to-head goal difference; 4) head-to-head number of goals scored; 5) Goal difference.

4 February 2024; 15:00	Report	Hungary	19–8	New Zealand	Aspire Dome, Doha; Referees: Asumi Tsuzaki (JPN), Natalia Markopoulou (GRE)
4 February 2024; 15:00	Report	Score by quarters: 5–2, 4–2, 2–1, 8–3			Aspire Dome, Doha; Referees: Asumi Tsuzaki (JPN), Natalia Markopoulou (GRE)
4 February 2024; 15:00	Report	Gurisatti 6	Goals	McDowall 4	Aspire Dome, Doha; Referees: Asumi Tsuzaki (JPN), Natalia Markopoulou (GRE)

6 February 2024; 10:30	Report	New Zealand	6–13	Australia	Aspire Dome, Doha; Referees: Matan Schwartz (ISR), Viktor Salnichenko (KAZ)
6 February 2024; 10:30	Report	Score by quarters: 2–3, 2–3, 1–3, 1–4			Aspire Dome, Doha; Referees: Matan Schwartz (ISR), Viktor Salnichenko (KAZ)
6 February 2024; 10:30	Report	Doyle, Houghton 2	Goals	Williams 4	Aspire Dome, Doha; Referees: Matan Schwartz (ISR), Viktor Salnichenko (KAZ)

8 February 2024; 09:00	Report	Singapore	4–30	New Zealand	Aspire Dome, Doha; Referees: Stanko Ivanovski (MNE), Yuri Maciel (BRA)
8 February 2024; 09:00	Report	Score by quarters: 1–10, 0–9, 0–5, 3–6			Aspire Dome, Doha; Referees: Stanko Ivanovski (MNE), Yuri Maciel (BRA)
8 February 2024; 09:00	Report	Yap 2	Goals	McDowall 9	Aspire Dome, Doha; Referees: Stanko Ivanovski (MNE), Yuri Maciel (BRA)

Playoffs

10 February 2024; 19:00	Report	New Zealand	12–14	Canada	Aspire Dome, Doha; Referees: Nóra Debreceni (HUN), Viktor Salnichenko (KAZ)
10 February 2024; 19:00	Report	Score by quarters: 2–5, 3–5, 4–2, 3–2			Aspire Dome, Doha; Referees: Nóra Debreceni (HUN), Viktor Salnichenko (KAZ)
10 February 2024; 19:00	Report	Houghton 5	Goals	Crevier 3	Aspire Dome, Doha; Referees: Nóra Debreceni (HUN), Viktor Salnichenko (KAZ)

9–12th place semifinals

12 February 2024; 13:30	Report	Kazakhstan	8–23	New Zealand	Aspire Dome, Doha; Referees: Giuliana Nicolosi (ITA), Hélène Painchaud (CAN)
12 February 2024; 13:30	Report	Score by quarters: 2–6, 1–5, 3–7, 2–5			Aspire Dome, Doha; Referees: Giuliana Nicolosi (ITA), Hélène Painchaud (CAN)
12 February 2024; 13:30	Report	Mirshina 3	Goals	McDowall 11	Aspire Dome, Doha; Referees: Giuliana Nicolosi (ITA), Hélène Painchaud (CAN)

Ninth place game

14 February 2024; 10:30	Report	China	15–16	New Zealand	Aspire Dome, Doha; Referees: Viktor Salnichenko (KAZ), Giuliana Nicolosi (ITA)
14 February 2024; 10:30	Report	Score by quarters: 4–4, 3–5, 3–4, 5–3			Aspire Dome, Doha; Referees: Viktor Salnichenko (KAZ), Giuliana Nicolosi (ITA)
14 February 2024; 10:30	Report	Lu 5	Goals	Houghton 5	Aspire Dome, Doha; Referees: Viktor Salnichenko (KAZ), Giuliana Nicolosi (ITA)
