= High diving at the 2024 World Aquatics Championships – Men =

Men's high diving at the 2024 World Aquatics Championships
- Venue: Old Doha Port
- Location: Doha, Qatar
- Dates: 13 February (round 1–2); 15 February (round 3–4)
- Competitors: 27 from 16 nations
- Winning points: 422.95

Medalists
gold medal	Aidan Heslop	Great Britain
silver medal	Gary Hunt	France
bronze medal	Cătălin Preda	Romania

The men's high diving competition at the 2024 World Aquatics Championships was held on 13 and 15 February 2024.

== Results ==
The first two rounds were started on 13 February at 14:02. Round three was held on 15 February at 11:02. The final round was started on 15 February at 11:55.

Rank	Diver	Nationality	Round 1	Round 2	Round 3	Round 4	Total
1st place, gold medalist(s)	Aidan Heslop	Great Britain	71.40	115.05	84.60	151.90	422.95
2nd place, silver medalist(s)	Gary Hunt	France	75.60	129.85	88.20	119.60	413.25
3rd place, bronze medalist(s)	Cătălin Preda	Romania	77.00	103.70	91.80	137.70	410.20
4	James Lichtenstein	United States	58.80	120.40	70.20	127.20	376.60
5	Yolotl Martínez	Mexico	71.40	106.60	82.80	102.50	363.30
6	Sergio Guzmán	Mexico	67.20	103.20	90.00	96.75	357.15
7	Carlos Gimeno	Spain	71.40	103.60	84.60	95.40	355.00
8	Constantin Popovici	Romania	54.60	113.10	91.80	81.00	340.50
9	Andrea Barnaba	Italy	64.40	98.40	86.40	75.85	325.05
10	Oleksiy Pryhorov	Ukraine	54.60	112.20	90.00	62.10	318.90
11	Miguel García	Colombia	57.40	115.15	81.00	64.40	317.95
12	Davide Baraldi	Italy	50.40	98.40	84.60	82.00	315.40
13	David Colturi	United States	60.20	78.20	79.20	85.10	302.70
14	Braden Rumpit	New Zealand	49.00	70.40	68.40	114.40	302.20
15	Pierrick Schafer	Switzerland	50.40	73.80	68.40	94.60	287.20
16	Scott Lazeroff	United States	64.40	60.20	81.00	81.00	286.60
17	Víctor Ortega	Colombia	40.60	83.25	68.40	75.25	267.50
18	Vadym Nevinhlovskyi	Ukraine	51.80	54.05	64.75	94.35	264.95
19	Zach Picton	Australia	50.40	86.00	61.20	64.75	262.35
20	Juan Gil	Colombia	47.60	67.65	77.40	48.30	240.95
21	Frédéric Gagné	Canada	39.20	57.00	68.40	73.80	238.40
22	Manuel Halbisch	Germany	43.40	55.50	51.00	68.40	218.30
23	Choi Byung-hwa	South Korea	43.40	68.40	56.10	49.40	217.30
24	Jean-David Duval	Switzerland	42.00	65.60	48.60	48.30	204.50
25	Jucelino Lima	Brazil	44.80	49.20	64.80	34.10	192.90
–	Matthias Appenzeller	Switzerland	44.80	Withdrawn			
–	Tim Thesing	Germany	5.60	Withdrawn			
