= Lorne Wigginton =

Canadian swimmer (born 2005)

Personal information
- National team: Canada
- Born: October 27, 2005 (age 21) Calgary, Alberta, Canada

Sport
- Sport: Swimming
- Strokes: Freestyle; Medley
Medal record
Men's swimming
Representing Canada
FINA World Junior Swimming Championships
Bronze medal – third place	2023 Netanya	200 m Individual medley
Bronze medal – third place	2023 Netanya	400 m Individual medley

Lorne Wigginton (born October 27, 2005) is a Canadian competitive swimmer, primarily competing in the freestyle and medley events.

== Career ==
At the 2023 World Aquatics Junior Swimming Championships, Wigginton won a bronze medal in both individual medley events. Wigginton would finish seventh in the 400 m individual medley at the 2024 Senior Worlds.

At the conclusion of the 2024 Canadian Swim trials, Wigginton was named to Canada's 2024 Olympics team.
