= Kurtis Mathews =

Australian diver (born 1999)

Personal information
- Birth name: Kurtis John Mathews
- Nationality: Australian
- Born: 15 April 1999 (age 25); Wodonga, Victoria, Australia
- Height: 173 cm (5 ft 8 in)
- Weight: 81 kg (179 lb)

Sport
- Sport: Diving

Kurtis John Mathews (born 15 April 1999) is an Australian diver who reached the final of the men's 3 metre springboard at the 2024 Summer Olympics. He also competed at the 2018 Commonwealth Games and the 2024 World Aquatics Championships.

Mathews was born in Wodonga, Victoria. He has a twin sister, Jayah. He studied biomedical sciences at Texas A&M University in the United States.
