= Greece at the 2024 World Aquatics Championships =

- Flag of Greece
- FINA code: GRE
- National federation: Hellenic Swimming Federation
- Website: koe.org.gr (in Greek)

in Doha, Qatar
- Competitors: 64 in 5 sports
- Medals Ranked 20th: Gold 1 Silver 1 Bronze 1 Total 3

World Aquatics Championships appearances
- 1973; 1975; 1978; 1982; 1986; 1991; 1994; 1998; 2001; 2003; 2005; 2007; 2009; 2011; 2013; 2015; 2017; 2019; 2022; 2023; 2024

Greece competed at the 2024 World Aquatics Championships in Doha, Qatar from 2 to 18 February.

== Medalists ==
Medal	Name	Sport	Event	Date
1st place, gold medalist(s)	Evangelia Platanioti	Artistic swimming	Women's solo technical routine	3 February 2024
2nd place, silver medalist(s)	Evangelia Platanioti	Artistic swimming	Women's solo free routine	6 February 2024
3rd place, bronze medalist(s)	Apostolos Christou	Swimming	Men's 100 metre backstroke	13 February 2024

== Competitors ==
The following is the list of competitors in the Championships.

Sport	Men	Women	Total
Artistic swimming	0	10	10
Diving	1	0	1
Open water swimming	2	1	3
Swimming	11	9	20
Water polo	15	15	30
Total	29	35	64

== Artistic swimming ==
Women

Athlete	Event	Preliminaries		Final	
Athlete	Event	Points	Rank	Points	Rank
Evangelia Platanioti	Solo technical routine	270.1901	1 Q	272.9633	1st place, gold medalist(s)
Evangelia Platanioti	Solo free routine	253.7353	2 Q	253.2833	2nd place, silver medalist(s)
Sofia Malkogeorgou; Evangelia Platanioti	Duet technical routine	251.7183	5 Q	245.9084	7
Sofia Malkogeorgou; Evangelia Platanioti	Duet free routine	232.8188	6 Q	236.7834	6

Mixed

Athlete	Event	Preliminaries		Final	
Athlete	Event	Points	Rank	Points	Rank
Maria Alzigkouzi Kominea; Thaleia Dampali; Zoi Karangelou; Maria Karapanagiotou; Danai Kariori; Ifigeneia Krommydaki; Sofia Malkogeorgou; Sofia Rigakou	Team technical routine	185.5846	14	Did not advance	
Maria Alzigkouzi Kominea; Thaleia Dampali; Zoi Karangelou; Maria Karapanagiotou; Danai Kariori; Ifigeneia Krommydaki; Sofia Malkogeorgou; Sofia Rigakou	Team free routine	270.9751	8 Q	267.8292	6
Maria Alzigkouzi Kominea; Thaleia Dampali; Zoi Karangelou; Maria Karapanagiotou; Danai Kariori; Artemi Koutraki; Ifigeneia Krommydaki; Sofia Malkogeorgou	Team acrobatic routine	214.2368	7 Q	173.0234	12

== Diving ==
Men

Athlete	Event	Preliminaries		Semifinals		Final	
Athlete	Event	Points	Rank	Points	Rank	Points	Rank
Athanasios Tsirikos	10 m platform	305.30	35	Did not advance			

== Open water swimming ==
Men

Athlete	Event	Time	Rank
Asterios Daldogiannis	Men's 5 km	55:10.5	39
Asterios Daldogiannis	Men's 10 km	1:53:51.7	43
Athanasios Kynigakis	Men's 5 km	51:36.1	7
Athanasios Kynigakis	Men's 10 km	1:48:34.6	13

Women

Athlete	Event	Time	Rank
Georgia Makri	Women's 5 km	59:21.3	36
Georgia Makri	Women's 10 km	2:04:05.9	36

== Swimming ==
Greece entered 20 swimmers.

Men

Athlete	Event	Heat		Semifinal		Final	
Athlete	Event	Time	Rank	Time	Rank	Time	Rank
Arkadios Aspougalis	50 metre breaststroke	27.62	16 Q	27.18	11	Did not advance	
Stergios Bilas	50 metre freestyle	22.23	24	Did not advance			
Stergios Bilas	50 metre butterfly	23.53; 24.87	16 S/off; 3	Did not advance			
Apostolos Christou	50 metre backstroke	25.03	11 Q	25.01	11	Did not advance	
Apostolos Christou	100 metre backstroke	53.79	7 Q	53.62	4 Q	53.36	3rd place, bronze medalist(s)
Apostolos Christou	200 metre backstroke	Did not start		Did not advance			
Kristian Gkolomeev	50 metre freestyle	21.70	3 Q	21.72	5 Q	21.84	8
Evangelos Makrygiannis	50 metre backstroke	25.18	16 Q	24.84	9	Did not advance	
Evangelos Makrygiannis	100 metre backstroke	53.43	2 Q	53.67	6 Q	53.38	4
Dimitrios Markos	800 metre freestyle	7:49.97 NR	14	—		Did not advance	
Apostolos Papastamos	200 metre butterfly	2:00.56	27	Did not advance			
Apostolos Papastamos	400 metre individual medley	Disqualified		—		Did not advance	
Apostolos Siskos	200 metre backstroke	1:56.64 NR	1 Q	1:56.82	6 Q	1:56.64	6 =NR
Konstantinos Stamou	100 metre butterfly	Did not start		Did not advance			
Andreas Vazaios	200 metre individual medley	Did not start		Did not advance			
Apostolos Christou; Kristian Gkolomeev; Stergios Bilas; Andreas Vazaios	4 × 100 m freestyle relay	3:14.33	5 Q	—		3:13.67	6
Dimitrios Markos; Konstantinos Englezakis; Konstantinos Stamou; Andreas Vazaios	4 × 200 m freestyle relay	7:09.90 NR	4 Q	—		7:09.10 NR	6
Evangelos Makrygiannis; Arkadios Aspougalis; Konstantinos Stamou; Stergios Bilas	4 × 100 m medley relay	3:37.11	15	—		Did not advance	

Women

Athlete	Event	Heat		Semifinal		Final	
Athlete	Event	Time	Rank	Time	Rank	Time	Rank
Georgia Damasioti	200 metre butterfly	2:12.09	15 Q	2:13.07	14	Did not advance	
Theodora Drakou	50 metre freestyle	Did not start		Did not advance			
Theodora Drakou	50 metre backstroke	28.09	5 Q	28.00	5 Q	27.84 NR	5
Maria-Thaleia Drasidou	50 metre breaststroke	31.49	20	Did not advance			
Eleni Kontogeorgou	200 metre breaststroke	2:28.53	15 Q	2:28.14	13	Did not advance	
Anna Ntountounaki	50 metre butterfly	26.26	13 Q	25.98; 25.97	8 S/off; 2 q	25.89	7
Anna Ntountounaki	100 metre butterfly	58.72	10 Q	57.86	5 Q	57.62	5
Artemis Vasilaki; Zacharoula Kalogeri; Maria Zafeiratou; Anastasia Boutou	4 × 200 m freestyle relay	8:13.59 NR	17	—		Did not advance	
Theodora Drakou; Eleni Kontogeorgou; Anna Ntountounaki; Maria Thaleia Drasidou	4 × 100 m medley relay	4:04.01 NR	11	—		Did not advance	

Mixed

Athlete	Event	Heat		Semifinal		Final	
Athlete	Event	Time	Rank	Time	Rank	Time	Rank
Apostolos Christou; Arkadios Aspougalis; Anna Ntountounaki; Theodora Drakou	4 × 100 m medley relay	3:46.54	4 Q	—		3:46.69	5

== Water polo ==
Summary

Team	Event	Group stage				Playoff	Quarterfinal	Semifinal	Final / BM	
Team	Event	Opposition Score	Opposition Score	Opposition Score	Rank	Opposition Score	Opposition Score	Opposition Score	Opposition Score	Rank
Greece	Men's tournament	China; W 24–6	Brazil; W 23–4	France; W 13–12	1 QF	—	Italy; L 10–11	Montenegro; W 14–13	Serbia; W 15–11	5
Greece	Women's tournament	France; W 11–6	Spain; L 8–16	China; W 22–9	2 QP	Kazakhstan; W 24–5	Italy; W 14–12	Hungary; L 11–13	Spain; L 9-10	4

=== Men's tournament ===
Team roster

The following is the Greek roster.

Head coach: Theodoros Vlachos

- 1 Emmanouil Zerdevas GK
- 2 Konstantinos Genidounias FP
- 3 Dimitrios Skoumpakis FP
- 4 Konstantinos Gkiouvetsis FP
- 5 Ioannis Fountoulis FP
- 6 Alexandros Papanastasiou FP
- 7 Nikolaos Gkillas FP
- 8 Stylianos Argyropoulos FP
- 9 Ioannis Alafragkis FP
- 10 Konstantinos Kakaris FP
- 11 Dimitrios Nikolaidis FP
- 12 Angelos Vlachopoulos FP
- 13 Panagiotis Tzortzatos GK
- 14 Efstathios Kalogeropoulos FP
- 15 Nikolaos Papanikolaou FP

Group play

Pos	Team	Pld	W	PSW	PSL	L	GF	GA	GD	Pts	Qualification
1	Greece	3	3	0	0	0	60	22	+38	9	Quarterfinals
2	France	3	2	0	0	1	44	33	+11	6	Playoffs
3	China	3	1	0	0	2	25	48	−23	3	Playoffs
4	Brazil	3	0	0	0	3	23	49	−26	0	13–16th place semifinals

Source: World Aquatics
Rules for classification: 1) points; 2) head-to-head points; 3) head-to-head goal difference; 4) head-to-head number of goals scored; 5) Goal difference.

5 February 2024; 10:30	Report	China	6–24	Greece	Aspire Dome, Doha; Referees: Alessandro Severo (ITA), Stanko Ivanovski (MNE)
5 February 2024; 10:30	Report	Score by quarters: 1–4, 0–6, 3–7, 2–7			Aspire Dome, Doha; Referees: Alessandro Severo (ITA), Stanko Ivanovski (MNE)
5 February 2024; 10:30	Report	Xie 2	Goals	Genidounias 5	Aspire Dome, Doha; Referees: Alessandro Severo (ITA), Stanko Ivanovski (MNE)

7 February 2024; 10:30	Report	Greece	23–4	Brazil	Aspire Dome, Doha; Referees: György Kun (HUN), Alessandro Severo (ITA)
7 February 2024; 10:30	Report	Score by quarters: 6–3, 4–0, 6–0, 7–1			Aspire Dome, Doha; Referees: György Kun (HUN), Alessandro Severo (ITA)
7 February 2024; 10:30	Report	Fountoulis 4	Goals	Pires 2	Aspire Dome, Doha; Referees: György Kun (HUN), Alessandro Severo (ITA)

9 February 2024; 19:00	Report	Greece	13–12	France	Aspire Dome, Doha; Referees: Andrej Franulović (CRO), Zhang Liang (CHN)
9 February 2024; 19:00	Report	Score by quarters: 3–3, 4–3, 3–2, 3–4			Aspire Dome, Doha; Referees: Andrej Franulović (CRO), Zhang Liang (CHN)
9 February 2024; 19:00	Report	four players 2	Goals	Marion-Vernoux 4	Aspire Dome, Doha; Referees: Andrej Franulović (CRO), Zhang Liang (CHN)

Quarterfinals

13 February 2024; 17:30	Report	Greece	10–11	Italy	Aspire Dome, Doha; Referees: Boris Margeta (SLO), Sébastien Dervieux (FRA)
13 February 2024; 17:30	Report	Score by quarters: 3–1, 2–5, 3–2, 2–3			Aspire Dome, Doha; Referees: Boris Margeta (SLO), Sébastien Dervieux (FRA)
13 February 2024; 17:30	Report	Genidounias 3	Goals	three players 2	Aspire Dome, Doha; Referees: Boris Margeta (SLO), Sébastien Dervieux (FRA)

5–8th place semifinals

15 February 2024; 12:00	Report	Montenegro	13–14	Greece	Aspire Dome, Doha; Referees: Alessandro Severo (ITA), Xavi Buch (ESP)
15 February 2024; 12:00	Report	Score by quarters: 2–2, 3–4, 1–2, 4–2 PSO: 3–4			Aspire Dome, Doha; Referees: Alessandro Severo (ITA), Xavi Buch (ESP)
15 February 2024; 12:00	Report	Đ. Radović 3	Goals	Kakaris 3	Aspire Dome, Doha; Referees: Alessandro Severo (ITA), Xavi Buch (ESP)

Fifth place game

17 February 2024; 16:00	Report	Greece	15–11	Serbia	Aspire Dome, Doha; Referees: Andrei Franulovic (CRO), Matan Schwartz (ISR)
17 February 2024; 16:00	Report	Score by quarters: 5–2, 3–3, 2–4, 5–2			Aspire Dome, Doha; Referees: Andrei Franulovic (CRO), Matan Schwartz (ISR)
17 February 2024; 16:00	Report	Gkiouvetsis, Kakaris 3	Goals	Drašović 3	Aspire Dome, Doha; Referees: Andrei Franulovic (CRO), Matan Schwartz (ISR)

=== Women's tournament ===
Team roster

The following is the Greek roster.

Head coach: Alexia Kammenou

- 1 Chrysi Diamantopoulou GK
- 2 Eleftheria Plevritou FP
- 3 Ioanna Chydirioti FP
- 4 Nikoleta Eleftheriadou FP
- 5 Margarita Plevritou FP
- 6 Eleni Xenaki FP
- 7 Alexandra Asimaki FP
- 8 Maria Patra FP
- 9 Eirini Ninou FP
- 10 Vasiliki Plevritou FP
- 11 Athina Giannopoulos FP
- 12 Maria Myriokefalitaki FP
- 13 Ioanna Stamatopoulou GK
- 14 Eleni Elliniadi FP
- 15 Foteini Tricha FP

Group play

Pos	Team	Pld	W	PSW	PSL	L	GF	GA	GD	Pts	Qualification
1	Spain	3	3	0	0	0	48	20	+28	9	Quarterfinals
2	Greece	3	2	0	0	1	41	31	+10	6	Playoffs
3	China	3	0	1	0	2	20	46	−26	2	Playoffs
4	France	3	0	0	1	2	19	31	−12	1	13–16th place semifinals

Source: World Aquatics
Rules for classification: 1) points; 2) head-to-head points; 3) head-to-head goal difference; 4) head-to-head number of goals scored; 5) Goal difference.

4 February 2024; 12:00	Report	Greece	11–6	France	Aspire Dome, Doha; Referees: Frank Ohme (GER), Andrej Franulović (CRO)
4 February 2024; 12:00	Report	Score by quarters: 3–2, 2–1, 4–2, 2–1			Aspire Dome, Doha; Referees: Frank Ohme (GER), Andrej Franulović (CRO)
4 February 2024; 12:00	Report	Plevritou 3	Goals	Guillet 2	Aspire Dome, Doha; Referees: Frank Ohme (GER), Andrej Franulović (CRO)

6 February 2024; 19:00	Report	Spain	16–8	Greece	Aspire Dome, Doha; Referees: Alessandro Severo (ITA), Ashleigh Kaeshler (AUS)
6 February 2024; 19:00	Report	Score by quarters: 2–2, 5–2, 4–2, 5–2			Aspire Dome, Doha; Referees: Alessandro Severo (ITA), Ashleigh Kaeshler (AUS)
6 February 2024; 19:00	Report	Ortiz 4	Goals	three players 2	Aspire Dome, Doha; Referees: Alessandro Severo (ITA), Ashleigh Kaeshler (AUS)

8 February 2024; 20:30	Report	Greece	22–9	China	Aspire Dome, Doha; Referees: Nóra Debreceni (HUN), Lucas Letshabo (RSA)
8 February 2024; 20:30	Report	Score by quarters: 7–2, 4–2, 6–1, 5–4			Aspire Dome, Doha; Referees: Nóra Debreceni (HUN), Lucas Letshabo (RSA)
8 February 2024; 20:30	Report	Ninou, Plevritou 4	Goals	Deng 3	Aspire Dome, Doha; Referees: Nóra Debreceni (HUN), Lucas Letshabo (RSA)

Playoffs

10 February 2024; 16:00	Report	Kazakhstan	5–24	Greece	Aspire Dome, Doha; Referees: Ashleigh Kaeshler (AUS), Cheng Beng Guan (SGP)
10 February 2024; 16:00	Report	Score by quarters: 2–8, 0–4, 1–7, 2–5			Aspire Dome, Doha; Referees: Ashleigh Kaeshler (AUS), Cheng Beng Guan (SGP)
10 February 2024; 16:00	Report	five players 1	Goals	Ninou 4	Aspire Dome, Doha; Referees: Ashleigh Kaeshler (AUS), Cheng Beng Guan (SGP)

Quarterfinals

12 February 2024; 20:30	Report	Italy	12–14	Greece	Aspire Dome, Doha; Referees: Matan Schwartz (ISR), Ashleigh Kaeshler (AUS)
12 February 2024; 20:30	Report	Score by quarters: 0–3, 3–4, 4–4, 5–3			Aspire Dome, Doha; Referees: Matan Schwartz (ISR), Ashleigh Kaeshler (AUS)
12 February 2024; 20:30	Report	Picozzi 3	Goals	Ninou 5	Aspire Dome, Doha; Referees: Matan Schwartz (ISR), Ashleigh Kaeshler (AUS)

Semifinals

14 February 2024; 17:30	Report	Hungary	13–11	Greece	Aspire Dome, Doha; Referees: Frank Ohme (GER), Zhang Liang (CHN)
14 February 2024; 17:30	Report	Score by quarters: 3–3, 3–3, 1–1, 2–2 PSO: 4–2			Aspire Dome, Doha; Referees: Frank Ohme (GER), Zhang Liang (CHN)
14 February 2024; 17:30	Report	Parkes 3	Goals	Ninou 4	Aspire Dome, Doha; Referees: Frank Ohme (GER), Zhang Liang (CHN)

Third place game

16 February 2024; 11:30	Report	Spain	10–9	Greece	Aspire Dome, Doha; Referees: Michiel Zwart (NED), Hélène Painchaud (CAN)
16 February 2024; 11:30	Report	Score by quarters: 2–1, 4–4, 1–1, 3–3			Aspire Dome, Doha; Referees: Michiel Zwart (NED), Hélène Painchaud (CAN)
16 February 2024; 11:30	Report	Forca 3	Goals	Ninou 3	Aspire Dome, Doha; Referees: Michiel Zwart (NED), Hélène Painchaud (CAN)
