= Diving at the 2024 World Aquatics Championships – Women's 1 metre springboard =

Women's 1 metre springboard at the 2024 World Aquatics Championships
- Venue: Hamad Aquatic Centre
- Location: Doha, Qatar
- Dates: 2 February (preliminary and final)
- Competitors: 47 from 32 nations
- Winning points: 260.50

Medalists
gold medal	Alysha Koloi	Australia
silver medal	Grace Reid	Great Britain
bronze medal	Maha Amer	Egypt

The Women's 1 metre springboard competition at the 2024 World Aquatics Championships was held on 2 February 2024.

== Results ==
The preliminary round was started at 10:02. The final was held at 19:02.

Green denotes finalists

Rank	Diver	Nationality	Preliminary		Final	
Rank	Diver	Nationality	Points	Rank	Points	Rank
1st place, gold medalist(s)	Alysha Koloi	Australia	240.00	6	260.50	1
2nd place, silver medalist(s)	Grace Reid	Great Britain	242.55	3	257.25	2
3rd place, bronze medalist(s)	Maha Amer	Egypt	257.95	1	257.15	3
4	Jette Müller	Germany	236.95	8	253.70	4
5	Arantxa Chávez	Mexico	232.80	10	249.70	5
6	Hailey Hernandez	United States	232.05	11	249.60	6
7	Alison Gibson	United States	240.45	5	249.35	7
8	Kim Su-ji	South Korea	243.85	2	248.60	8
9	Michelle Heimberg	Switzerland	230.95	12	248.50	9
10	Emilia Nilsson Garip	Sweden	242.15	4	247.45	10
11	Elena Bertocchi	Italy	239.95	7	236.55	11
12	Elna Widerström	Sweden	233.35	9	235.50	12
13	Paola Pineda	Mexico	230.85	13	Did not advance	
14	Naïs Gillet	France	229.40	14	Did not advance	
15	Mia Vallée	Canada	229.35	15	Did not advance	
16	Lauren Hallaselkä	Finland	229.30	16	Did not advance	
17	Anna Santos	Brazil	228.65	17	Did not advance	
18	Prisis Ruiz	Cuba	227.80	18	Did not advance	
19	Kaja Skrzek	Poland	225.55	19	Did not advance	
20	Lauren Burch	Puerto Rico	215.25	20	Did not advance	
21	Aleksandra Błażowska	Poland	214.60	21	Did not advance	
22	Luana Lira	Brazil	213.55	22	Did not advance	
23	Kim Na-hyun	South Korea	212.05	23	Did not advance	
24	Elizabeth Pérez	Venezuela	208.55	24	Did not advance	
25	Madeline Coquoz	Switzerland	207.35	25	Did not advance	
26	Kimberly Bong	Malaysia	205.80	26	Did not advance	
27	Elizabeth Roussel	New Zealand	205.10	27	Did not advance	
28	Saskia Oettinghaus	Germany	203.90	28	Did not advance	
29	Bailey Heydra	South Africa	201.35	29	Did not advance	
30	Caroline Kupka	Norway	199.30	30	Did not advance	
31	Ong Ker Ying	Malaysia	198.00	31	Did not advance	
32	Brittany O'Brien	Australia	194.10	32	Did not advance	
33	Chiara Pellacani	Italy	193.05	33	Did not advance	
34	Victoria Garza	Dominican Republic	183.15	34	Did not advance	
35	Zalika Methula	South Africa	181.05	35	Did not advance	
36	Tereza Jelínková	Czech Republic	180.00	36	Did not advance	
37	Estilla Mosena	Hungary	178.95	37	Did not advance	
38	Sude Köprülü	Turkey	167.30	38	Did not advance	
39	Laura Valore	Denmark	165.25	39	Did not advance	
40	Patrícia Kun	Hungary	156.40	40	Did not advance	
41	Ashlee Tan	Singapore	155.05	41	Did not advance	
42	Ivana Medková	Czech Republic	148.55	42	Did not advance	
43	Tekle Sharia	Georgia	148.30	43	Did not advance	
44	Chan Tsz Ming	Hong Kong	141.95	44	Did not advance	
45	Gladies Lariesa Garina Haga	Indonesia	135.65	45	Did not advance	
46	Mariam Shanidze	Georgia	127.80	46	Did not advance	
47	Palak Sharma	India	117.65	47	Did not advance	
