= Singapore at the 2024 World Aquatics Championships =

- Flag of Singapore
- World Aquatics code: SGP
- National federation: Singapore Swimming Federation
- Website: singaporeswimming.org

in Doha, Qatar
- Competitors: 35 in 5 sports
- Medals: Gold 0 Silver 0 Bronze 0 Total 0

World Aquatics Championships appearances
- 1973; 1975; 1978; 1982; 1986; 1991; 1994; 1998; 2001; 2003; 2005; 2007; 2009; 2011; 2013; 2015; 2017; 2019; 2022; 2023; 2024; 2025

Singapore competed at the 2024 World Aquatics Championships in Doha, Qatar from 2 to 18 February.

== Competitors ==
The following is the list of competitors in the Championships.

Sport	Men	Women	Total
Artistic swimming	0	2	2
Diving	2	2	4
Open water swimming	2	2	4
Swimming	6	6	12
Water polo	0	13	13
Total	10	25	35

== Artistic swimming ==
Women

Athlete	Event	Preliminaries		Final	
Athlete	Event	Points	Rank	Points	Rank
Yvette Chong; Debbie Soh	Duet technical routine	206.6867	21	Did not advance	
Yvette Chong; Debbie Soh	Duet free routine	170.9959	20	Did not advance	

== Diving ==
Men

Athlete	Event	Preliminaries		Semifinals		Final	
Athlete	Event	Points	Rank	Points	Rank	Points	Rank
Shen Lee	10 m platform	313.50	34	Did not advance			
Avvir Tham	1 m springboard	198.05	38	—		Did not advance	
Avvir Tham	3 m springboard	266.20	57	Did not advance			

Women

Athlete	Event	Preliminaries		Semifinals		Final	
Athlete	Event	Points	Rank	Points	Rank	Points	Rank
Ashlee Tan	1 m springboard	155.05	41	—		Did not advance	
Ashlee Tan	3 m springboardm	217.20	37	Did not advance			
Megan Yow	10 m platform	186.40	41	Did not advance			

== Open water swimming ==
Men

Athlete	Event	Time	Rank
Artyom Lukasevits	Men's 10 km	1:54:05.0	49
Sheldon Tan	Men's 10 km	2:14:57.3	77

Women

Athlete	Event	Time	Rank
Chantal Liew	Women's 5 km	Did not finish}	
Chantal Liew	Women's 10 km	2:04:22.8	38
Ashley Ng	Women's 10 km	2:26:08.4	67

== Swimming ==
Singapore entered 12 swimmers.

Men

Athlete	Event	Heat		Semifinal		Final	
Athlete	Event	Time	Rank	Time	Rank	Time	Rank
Mikkel Lee	50 metre butterfly	Did not start		Did not advance			
Glen Lim Jun Wei	200 metre freestyle	1:49.71	34	Did not advance			
Glen Lim Jun Wei	400 metre freestyle	3:52.91	30	—		Did not advance	
Glen Lim Jun Wei	800 metre freestyle	8:09.34	34	—		Did not advance	
Jonathan Tan	50 metre freestyle	22.27	28	Did not advance			
Jonathan Tan	100 metre freestyle	49.32	28	Did not advance			
Teong Tzen Wei	50 metre butterfly	23.53; 23.42	16 S/off; 1 q	23.49	15	Did not advance	
Teong Tzen Wei	100 metre butterfly	52.62	18	Did not advance			
Mikkel Lee; Jonathan Tan; Ardi Azman; Darren Lim	4 × 100 m freestyle relay	3:18.52	14	—		Did not advance	

Women

Athlete	Event	Heat		Semifinal		Final	
Athlete	Event	Time	Rank	Time	Rank	Time	Rank
Gan Ching Hwee	400 metre freestyle	4:14.54	19	—		Did not advance	
Gan Ching Hwee	1500 metre freestyle	16:29.74	14	—		Did not advance	
Ashley Lim	200 metre freestyle	2:05.05	36	Did not advance			
Ashley Lim	800 metre freestyle	8:54.29	21	—		Did not advance	
Quah Jing Wen	100 metre butterfly	59.61	18	Did not advance			
Quah Jing Wen	200 metre butterfly	2:11.86	12 Q	2:10.31	10	Did not advance	
Quah Ting Wen	50 metre freestyle	25.47	20	Did not advance			
Quah Ting Wen	100 metre freestyle	55.82	22	Did not advance			
Quah Ting Wen	50 metre butterfly	26.78	21	Did not advance			
Levenia Sim	50 metre backstroke	29.35	29	Did not advance			
Levenia Sim	100 metre backstroke	1:02.72	24	Did not advance			
Letitia Sim	100 metre breaststroke	1:06.97	7 Q	1:07.14	11	Did not advance	
Letitia Sim	200 metre breaststroke	2:27.08	10 Q	2:27.04	12	Did not advance	
Letitia Sim	200 metre individual medley	2:14.26	13 WD	Did not advance			
Levenia Sim; Letitia Sim; Quah Jing Wen; Quah Ting Wen	4 × 100 m medley relay	4:02.88 NR	9	—		Did not advance	

Mixed

Athlete	Event	Heat		Semifinal		Final	
Athlete	Event	Time	Rank	Time	Rank	Time	Rank
Levenia Sim; Letitia Sim; Tzen Wei Teong; Mikkel Lee	4 × 100 m medley relay	3:51.02	14	—		Did not advance	

== Water polo ==
Summary

Team	Event	Group stage				Playoff	Quarterfinal	Semifinal	Final / BM	
Team	Event	Opposition Score	Opposition Score	Opposition Score	Rank	Opposition Score	Opposition Score	Opposition Score	Opposition Score	Rank
Singapore	Women's tournament	Australia; L 1–32	Hungary; L 2–39	New Zealand; L 4–30	4	—	—	South Africa; L 6–20	Brazil; L 2–18	16

=== Women's tournament ===
Team roster

The following is the Singaporian roster.

Head coach: Yu Lei

- 1 Rochelle Ong GK
- 2 Charlene Tio FP
- 3 Zhu Zhiyun FP
- 4 Yap Jingxuan FP
- 5 Koh Ting Ting FP
- 6 Nicole Lim FP
- 7 Abielle Yeo FP
- 8 Melissa Chan FP
- 9 Heather Lee FP
- 10 Gan Huimin FP
- 11 Wan Celeste FP
- 12 Juni Ong FP
- 13 Mounisha Devi GK

Group play

Pos	Team	Pld	W	PSW	PSL	L	GF	GA	GD	Pts	Qualification
1	Hungary	3	3	0	0	0	71	19	+52	9	Quarterfinals
2	Australia	3	2	0	0	1	54	20	+34	6	Playoffs
3	New Zealand	3	1	0	0	2	44	36	+8	3	Playoffs
4	Singapore	3	0	0	0	3	7	101	−94	0	13–16th place semifinals

Source: World Aquatics
Rules for classification: 1) points; 2) head-to-head points; 3) head-to-head goal difference; 4) head-to-head number of goals scored; 5) Goal difference.

4 February 2024; 13:30	Report	Australia	32–1	Singapore	Aspire Dome, Doha; Referees: Matan Schwartz (ISR), Lucas Letshabo (RSA)
4 February 2024; 13:30	Report	Score by quarters: 7–1, 13–0, 6–0, 6–0			Aspire Dome, Doha; Referees: Matan Schwartz (ISR), Lucas Letshabo (RSA)
4 February 2024; 13:30	Report	Gofers 5	Goals	Wan 1	Aspire Dome, Doha; Referees: Matan Schwartz (ISR), Lucas Letshabo (RSA)

6 February 2024; 13:30	Report	Singapore	2–39	Hungary	Aspire Dome, Doha; Referees: Lucas Letshabo (RSA), Giuliana Nicolosi (ITA)
6 February 2024; 13:30	Report	Score by quarters: 0–11, 0–7, 2–11, 0–10			Aspire Dome, Doha; Referees: Lucas Letshabo (RSA), Giuliana Nicolosi (ITA)
6 February 2024; 13:30	Report	Yap 2	Goals	Gurisatti, Rybanska 6	Aspire Dome, Doha; Referees: Lucas Letshabo (RSA), Giuliana Nicolosi (ITA)

8 February 2024; 09:00	Report	Singapore	4–30	New Zealand	Aspire Dome, Doha; Referees: Stanko Ivanovski (MNE), Yuri Maciel (BRA)
8 February 2024; 09:00	Report	Score by quarters: 1–10, 0–9, 0–5, 3–6			Aspire Dome, Doha; Referees: Stanko Ivanovski (MNE), Yuri Maciel (BRA)
8 February 2024; 09:00	Report	Yap 2	Goals	McDowall 9	Aspire Dome, Doha; Referees: Stanko Ivanovski (MNE), Yuri Maciel (BRA)

13–16th place semifinals

10 February 2024; 10:30	Report	Singapore	6–20	South Africa	Aspire Dome, Doha; Referees: Giuliana Nicolosi (ITA), David Couper (NZL)
10 February 2024; 10:30	Report	Score by quarters: 3–4, 1–5, 0–5, 2–6			Aspire Dome, Doha; Referees: Giuliana Nicolosi (ITA), David Couper (NZL)
10 February 2024; 10:30	Report	Yap 2	Goals	Versfeld 4	Aspire Dome, Doha; Referees: Giuliana Nicolosi (ITA), David Couper (NZL)

15th place game

12 February 2024; 09:00	Report	Brazil	18–2	Singapore	Aspire Dome, Doha; Referees: Viktor Salnichenko (KAZ), Lucas Letshabo (RSA)
12 February 2024; 09:00	Report	Score by quarters: 4–0, 2–0, 4–0, 8–2			Aspire Dome, Doha; Referees: Viktor Salnichenko (KAZ), Lucas Letshabo (RSA)
12 February 2024; 09:00	Report	three players 3	Goals	Lee, Lim 1	Aspire Dome, Doha; Referees: Viktor Salnichenko (KAZ), Lucas Letshabo (RSA)
