= Venezuela at the 2024 World Aquatics Championships =

- Flag of Venezuela
- FINA code: VEN
- National federation: Venezuelan Water Sports Federation
- Website: feveda.org.ve (in Spanish)

in Doha, Qatar
- Competitors: 15 in 3 sports
- Medals: Gold 0 Silver 0 Bronze 0 Total 0

World Aquatics Championships appearances
- 1973; 1975; 1978; 1982; 1986; 1991; 1994; 1998; 2001; 2003; 2005; 2007; 2009; 2011; 2013; 2015; 2017; 2019; 2022; 2023; 2024

Venezuela competed at the 2024 World Aquatics Championships in Doha, Qatar from 2 to 18 February.

== Competitors ==
The following is the list of competitors in the Championships.

Sport	Men	Women	Total
Diving	2	2	4
Open water swimming	3	2	5
Swimming	3	3	6
Total	8	7	15

== Diving ==
Men

Athlete	Event	Preliminaries		Semifinals		Final	
Athlete	Event	Points	Rank	Points	Rank	Points	Rank
Jesus González	10 m platform	347.10	26	Did not advance			
Walter Rojas	10 m platform	241.90	43	Did not advance			

Women

Athlete	Event	Preliminaries		Semifinals		Final	
Athlete	Event	Points	Rank	Points	Rank	Points	Rank
Dhavgely Mendoza	10 m platform	173.25	43	Did not advance			
Elizabeth Pérez	1 m springboard	208.55	24	—		Did not advance	
Elizabeth Pérez	3 m springboard	215.25	39	Did not advance			

== Open water swimming ==
Men

Athlete	Event	Time	Rank
Johndry Segovia	Men's 10 km	1:52:14.1	40
Diego Vera	Men's 5 km	55:28.2	52
Diego Vera	Men's 10 km	2:06:09.9	70
Ronaldo Zambrano	Men's 5 km	54:13.9	33

Women

Athlete	Event	Time	Rank
Ruthseli Aponte	Women's 5 km	1:04:56.8	50
Ruthseli Aponte	Women's 10 km	2:17:43.6	62
Paola Pérez	Women's 5 km	59:14.9	32
Paola Pérez	Women's 10 km	2:00:22.5	30

Mixed

Athlete	Event	Time	Rank
Ruthseli Aponte; Paola Pérez; Johndry Segovia; Ronaldo Zambrano	Team relay	1:10:45.5	20

== Swimming ==
Venezuela entered 6 swimmers.

Men

Athlete	Event	Heat		Semifinal		Final	
Athlete	Event	Time	Rank	Time	Rank	Time	Rank
Alberto Mestre	50 metre freestyle	22.26	27	Did not advance			
Alberto Mestre	100 metre freestyle	49.09	19	Did not advance			
Alfonso Mestre	200 metre freestyle	1:48.74	30	Did not advance			
Alfonso Mestre	400 metre freestyle	3:48.38	18	—		Did not advance	
Alfonso Mestre	800 metre freestyle	7:48.84	13	—		Did not advance	
Jorge Otaiza	50 metre butterfly	23.87	27	Did not advance			
Jorge Otaiza	100 metre butterfly	53.10	24	Did not advance			

Women

Athlete	Event	Heat		Semifinal		Final	
Athlete	Event	Time	Rank	Time	Rank	Time	Rank
Carla Gonzalez	100 metre freestyle	56.68	28	Did not advance			
Carla Gonzalez	100 metre backstroke	1:01.83	17	Did not advance			
Lismar Lyon	50 metre freestyle	25.50	23	Did not advance			
Lismar Lyon	50 metre butterfly	26.57	19	Did not advance			
Maria Yegres	200 metre freestyle	2:01.96	30	Did not advance			
Maria Yegres	400 metre freestyle	4:17.65	22	—		Did not advance	
