= Diving at the 2024 World Aquatics Championships – Men's 10 metre platform =

Men's 10 metre platform at the 2024 World Aquatics Championships
- Venue: Hamad Aquatic Centre
- Location: Doha, Qatar
- Dates: 9 February (preliminary); 10 February (semifinal and final)
- Competitors: 45 from 29 nations
- Winning points: 564.05

Medalists
gold medal	Yang Hao	China
silver medal	Cao Yuan	China
bronze medal	Oleksiy Sereda	Ukraine

The Men's 10 metre platform competition at the 2024 World Aquatics Championships was held on 9 and 10 February 2024.

== Results ==
The preliminary round was started on 9 February at 12:32. The semifinal was held on 10 February at 10:02. The final was started on 10 February at 18:32.

Green denotes finalists

Blue denotes semifinalists

Rank	Diver	Nationality	Preliminary		Semifinal		Final	
Rank	Diver	Nationality	Points	Rank	Points	Rank	Points	Rank
1st place, gold medalist(s)	Yang Hao	China	497.70	2	468.15	3	564.05	1
2nd place, silver medalist(s)	Cao Yuan	China	503.80	1	492.75	1	553.20	2
3rd place, bronze medalist(s)	Oleksiy Sereda	Ukraine	446.40	5	441.70	5	528.65	3
4	Randal Willars	Mexico	449.75	4	468.55	2	505.00	4
5	Rylan Wiens	Canada	415.95	9	456.95	4	489.20	5
6	Kyle Kothari	Great Britain	398.10	11	409.00	11	482.20	6
7	Noah Williams	Great Britain	451.95	3	439.70	6	479.05	7
8	Brandon Loschiavo	United States	409.00	10	413.65	9	453.35	8
9	Nathan Zsombor-Murray	Canada	433.55	7	415.40	8	452.25	9
10	Kevin Berlín	Mexico	435.80	6	410.60	10	389.25	10
11	Robert Łukaszewicz	Poland	372.25	15	406.80	12	387.55	11
12	Igor Myalin	Uzbekistan	377.85	14	415.80	7	379.80	12
13	Sebastián Villa	Colombia	372.15	16	385.40	13	Did not advance	
14	Im Yong-myong	North Korea	416.60	8	383.45	14	Did not advance	
15	Andreas Sargent Larsen	Italy	365.85	18	361.15	15	Did not advance	
16	Riccardo Giovannini	Italy	379.75	13	360.05	16	Did not advance	
17	Anton Knoll	Austria	368.00	17	320.95	17	Did not advance	
18	Shin Jung-whi	South Korea	379.85	12	302.55	18	Did not advance	
19	Joshua Hedberg	United States	365.75	19	Did not advance			
20	Emanuel Vázquez	Puerto Rico	359.30	20	Did not advance			
21	Jaxon Bowshire	Australia	357.35	21	Did not advance			
22	Yevhen Naumenko	Ukraine	354.70	22	Did not advance			
23	Jorge Rodríguez	Spain	353.35	23	Did not advance			
24	Jaden Eikermann	Germany	351.60	24	Did not advance			
25	Carlos Camacho	Spain	350.70	25	Did not advance			
26	Jesus González	Venezuela	347.10	26	Did not advance			
27	Enrique Harold	Malaysia	340.40	27	Did not advance			
28	Isak Børslien	Norway	338.15	28	Did not advance			
29	Nathan Brown	New Zealand	331.10	29	Did not advance			
30	Carlos Ramos	Cuba	329.45	30	Did not advance			
31	Leonardo García	Colombia	318.75	31	Did not advance			
32	Jellson Jabillin	Malaysia	318.10	32	Did not advance			
33	Omar El-Sayed	Egypt	315.10	33	Did not advance			
34	Shen Lee	Singapore	313.50	34	Did not advance			
35	Athanasios Tsirikos	Greece	305.30	35	Did not advance			
36	Dariush Lotfi	Austria	290.15	36	Did not advance			
37	Ko Che-won	North Korea	281.20	37	Did not advance			
38	Luis Avila Sanchez	Germany	272.20	38	Did not advance			
39	Kai Kaneto	Japan	261.30	39	Did not advance			
40	Constantin Popovici	Romania	257.10	40	Did not advance			
41	Ningthoujam Wilson Singh	India	254.85	41	Did not advance			
42	Luke Sipkes	New Zealand	252.00	42	Did not advance			
43	Walter Rojas	Venezuela	241.90	43	Did not advance			
44	Aleksa Teofilović	Serbia	234.95	44	Did not advance			
45	Ramez Sobhy	Egypt	233.50	45	Did not advance			
	Kim Yeong-taek	South Korea	Did not start					
