= Diving at the 2024 World Aquatics Championships – Women's 10 metre platform =

Women's 10 metre platform at the 2024 World Aquatics Championships
- Venue: Hamad Aquatic Centre
- Location: Doha, Qatar
- Dates: 4 February (preliminary); 5 February (semifinal and final)
- Competitors: 46 from 32 nations
- Winning points: 436.25

Medalists
gold medal	Quan Hongchan	China
silver medal	Chen Yuxi	China
bronze medal	Andrea Spendolini-Sirieix	Great Britain

The Women's 10 metre platform competition at the 2024 World Aquatics Championships was held on 4 and 5 February 2024.

== Results ==
The preliminary round was started on 4 February at 10:02. The semifinal was started on 5 February at 10:02. The final was started on 5 February at 18:32.

Green denotes finalists

Blue denotes semifinalists

Rank	Diver	Nationality	Preliminary		Semifinal		Final	
Rank	Diver	Nationality	Points	Rank	Points	Rank	Points	Rank
1st place, gold medalist(s)	Quan Hongchan	China	399.30	2	405.30	2	436.25	1
2nd place, silver medalist(s)	Chen Yuxi	China	435.20	1	421.85	1	427.80	2
3rd place, bronze medalist(s)	Andrea Spendolini-Sirieix	Great Britain	344.00	3	320.10	4	377.10	3
4	Kim Mi-rae	North Korea	295.50	11	325.20	3	349.10	4
5	Sarah Jodoin Di Maria	Italy	319.45	4	293.75	7	322.15	5
6	Lois Toulson	Great Britain	283.40	13	273.90	11	321.60	6
7	Gabriela Agúndez	Mexico	301.80	7	311.45	6	316.30	7
8	Caeli McKay	Canada	318.40	5	273.15	12	310.05	8
9	Alejandra Orozco	Mexico	305.70	6	317.50	5	291.80	9
10	Pauline Pfeif	Germany	267.90	17	278.20	10	277.60	10
11	Else Praasterink	Netherlands	286.90	12	285.80	9	271.10	11
12	Melissa Wu	Australia	301.40	8	293.70	8	267.10	12
13	Rin Kaneto	Japan	279.75	15	271.10	13	Did not advance	
14	Christina Wassen	Germany	295.70	10	266.40	14	Did not advance	
15	Maycey Vieta	Puerto Rico	296.50	9	261.50	15	Did not advance	
16	Kim Na-hyun	South Korea	275.45	16	250.95	16	Did not advance	
17	Sofiya Lyskun	Ukraine	281.70	14	249.70	17	Did not advance	
18	Maia Biginelli	Italy	263.25	18	241.40	18	Did not advance	
19	Anisley García	Cuba	259.90	19	Did not advance			
20	Katrina Young	United States	259.10	20	Did not advance			
21	Džeja Patrika	Latvia	257.30	21	Did not advance			
22	Victoria Garza	Dominican Republic	253.90	22	Did not advance			
23	Matsuri Arai	Japan	253.20	23	Did not advance			
24	Daryn Wright	United States	252.35	24	Did not advance			
25	Kate Miller	Canada	248.80	25	Did not advance			
26	Ciara McGing	Ireland	243.20	26	Did not advance			
27	Mikali Dawson	New Zealand	237.80	27	Did not advance			
28	Karina Hlyzhina	Ukraine	237.00	28	Did not advance			
29	Pandelela Rinong	Malaysia	231.15	29	Did not advance			
30	Cho Eun-bi	South Korea	230.25	30	Did not advance			
31	Kim Hui-yon	North Korea	228.35	31	Did not advance			
32	Helle Tuxen	Norway	227.70	32	Did not advance			
33	Elizabeth Miclau	Puerto Rico	225.40	33	Did not advance			
34	Valeria Antolino	Spain	224.90	34	Did not advance			
35	Nikita Hains	Australia	223.60	35	Did not advance			
36	Nicoleta Muscalu	Romania	209.40	36	Did not advance			
37	Jade Gillet	France	205.10	37	Did not advance			
38	Giovanna Pedroso	Brazil	204.20	38	Did not advance			
39	Mariana Osorio	Colombia	199.10	39	Did not advance			
40	Eszter Kovács	Hungary	193.80	40	Did not advance			
41	Megan Yow	Singapore	186.40	41	Did not advance			
42	Malak Tawfik	Egypt	175.65	42	Did not advance			
43	Dhavgely Mendoza	Venezuela	173.25	43	Did not advance			
44	Nur Eilisha Rania Muhammad Abrar Raj	Malaysia	167.55	44	Did not advance			
45	Palak Sharma	India	137.60	45	Did not advance			
46	Alisa Zakaryan	Armenia	129.70	46	Did not advance			
