= Hungary at the 2024 World Aquatics Championships =

- Flag of Hungary
- World Aquatics code: HUN
- National federation: Hungarian Swimming Association
- Website: musz.hu (in Hungarian)

in Doha, Qatar
- Competitors: 67 in 5 sports
- Medals Ranked 17th: Gold 1 Silver 1 Bronze 2 Total 4

World Aquatics Championships appearances (overview)
- 1973; 1975; 1978; 1982; 1986; 1991; 1994; 1998; 2001; 2003; 2005; 2007; 2009; 2011; 2013; 2015; 2017; 2019; 2022; 2023; 2024; 2025

Hungary competed at the 2024 World Aquatics Championships in Doha, Qatar from 2 to 18 February.

== Medalists ==
Medal	Name	Sport	Event	Date
1st place, gold medalist(s)	Kristóf Rasovszky	Open water swimming	Men's 10 km	4 February 2024
2nd place, silver medalist(s)	Hungary women's national water polo team: Alda Magyari Dorottya Szilágyi Vanda Vályi Gréta Gurisatti Géraldine Mahieu Rebecca Parkes Zsuzsanna Máté Rita Keszthelyi; Dóra Leimeter Natasa Rybanska Kamilla Faragó Krisztina Garda Boglárka Neszmély Brigitta Horváth Szonja Kuna	Water polo	Women's tournament	16 February 2024
3rd place, bronze medalist(s)	Bettina Fábián; Mira Szimcsák; Dávid Betlehem; Kristóf Rasovszky	Open water swimming	Team	8 February 2024
3rd place, bronze medalist(s)	Nándor Németh	Swimming	Men's 100 metre freestyle	15 February 2024

== Competitors ==
The following is the list of competitors in the Championships.

Sport	Men	Women	Total
Artistic swimming	0	10	10
Diving	0	3	3
Open water swimming	2*	3	5*
Swimming	10*	11	21*
Water polo	15	15	30
Total	25*	42	67*

Dávid Betlehem and Kristóf Rasovszky competed in both open water swimming and pool swimming.

== Artistic swimming ==
Women

Athlete	Event	Preliminaries		Final	
Athlete	Event	Points	Rank	Points	Rank
Blanka Barbócz; Angelika Bastianelli	Duet technical routine	204.3967	23	Did not advance	
Blanka Barbócz; Angelika Bastianelli	Duet free routine	150.5209	26	Did not advance	

Mixed

Athlete	Event	Preliminaries		Final	
Athlete	Event	Points	Rank	Points	Rank
Gréta Fehér; Lilien Götz; Szabina Hungler; Titanilla Janku; Kira Kecskés; Réka Márialigeti; Léna Szórát; Blanka Taksonyi	Team acrobatic routine	174.3800	14	Did not advance	

== Diving ==
Women

Athlete	Event	Preliminaries		Semifinals		Final	
Athlete	Event	Points	Rank	Points	Rank	Points	Rank
Eszter Kovács	10 m platform	193.80	40	Did not advance			
Patrícia Kun	1 m springboard	156.40	40	—		Did not advance	
Patrícia Kun	3 m springboard	Did not finish		Did not advance			
Estilla Mosena	1 m springboard	178.95	37	—		Did not advance	
Estilla Mosena	3 m springboard	194.80	45	Did not advance			

== Open water swimming ==
Men

Athlete	Event	Time	Rank
Dávid Betlehem	Men's 5 km	51:34.8	5
Dávid Betlehem	Men's 10 km	1:48:29.9	6
Kristóf Rasovszky	Men's 5 km	51:30.5	4
Kristóf Rasovszky	Men's 10 km	1:48:21.2	1st place, gold medalist(s)

Women

Athlete	Event	Time	Rank
Bettina Fábián	Women's 10 km	1:57:36.5	12
Anna Olasz	Women's 5 km	59:15.0	33
Mira Szimcsák	Women's 5 km	59:00.6	20
Mira Szimcsák	Women's 10 km	1:58:37.5	26

Mixed

Athlete	Event	Time	Rank
Dávid Betlehem; Bettina Fábián; Kristóf Rasovszky; Mira Szimcsák	Team relay	1:04:06.8	3rd place, bronze medalist(s)

== Swimming ==
Hungary entered 21 swimmers.

Men

Athlete	Event	Heat		Semifinal		Final	
Athlete	Event	Time	Rank	Time	Rank	Time	Rank
Dávid Betlehem	800 metre freestyle	7:48.06	9	—		Did not advance	
Dávid Betlehem	1500 metre freestyle	14:51.48	3 Q	—		14:46.44	4
Balázs Holló	200 metre individual medley	2:00.40	12 Q	2:00.39	14	Did not advance	
Balázs Holló	400 metre individual medley	4:13.93	6 Q	—		4:19.66	8
Ádám Jászó	50 metre backstroke	25.43	19	Did not advance			
Ádám Jászó	100 metre backstroke	54.51	19	Did not advance			
Richárd Márton	200 metre butterfly	1:56.54	8 Q	1:56.04	8 Q	1:55.76	6
Nándor Németh	100 metre freestyle	48.03	3 Q	47.96	4 Q	47.78	3rd place, bronze medalist(s)
Nándor Németh	200 metre freestyle	1:47.52	19	Did not advance			
Kristóf Rasovszky	400 metre freestyle	3:46.77	11	—		Did not advance	
Kristóf Rasovszky	800 metre freestyle	7:47.19	5 Q	—		7:44.42 NR	5
Kristóf Rasovszky	1500 metre freestyle	14:59.44	12	—		Did not advance	
Szebasztian Szabo	50 metre freestyle	22.32	30	Did not advance			
Szebasztian Szabo	100 metre freestyle	49.10	20	Did not advance			
Szebasztian Szabo	50 metre butterfly	23.35	9 Q	23.32	11	Did not advance	
Ádám Telegdy	200 metre backstroke	1:58.07'	5 Q	1:56.65	4 Q	1:56.66	7
Nándor Németh; Szebasztián Szabó; Dániel Mészáros; Ádám Jászó	4 × 100 m freestyle relay	3:14.73	8 Q	—		3:13.66	5
Ádám Jászó; Dániel Sós; Richárd Márton; Nándor Németh	4 × 100 m medley relay	3:36.86	13	—		Did not advance	

Women

Athlete	Event	Heat		Semifinal		Final	
Athlete	Event	Time	Rank	Time	Rank	Time	Rank
Boglárka Kapás	200 metre butterfly	2:09.99	5 Q	2:08.48	4 Q	2:08.81	6
Boglárka Kapás	400 metre individual medley	4:43.53	7 Q	—		4:39.78	5
Ajna Késely	800 metre freestyle	8:32.88	6 Q	—		8:29.83	8
Ajna Késely	1500 metre freestyle	16:34.84	16	—		Did not advance	
Dóra Molnár	200 metre backstroke	2:11.35	6 Q	2:10.31	7 Q	2:11.01	7
Nikolett Pádár	100 metre freestyle	55.21	16 WD	Did not advance			
Nikolett Pádár	200 metre freestyle	1:57.42	3 Q	1:57.13	8 Q	1:56.89	6
Nikolett Pádár	400 metre freestyle	4:09.21	9	—		Did not advance	
Dalma Sebestyén	200 metre butterfly	2:10.34	7 Q	2:09.14	6 Q	2:09.80	7
Dalma Sebestyén	200 metre individual medley	2:14.27	14 Q	2:13.25	11	Did not advance	
Eszter Szabó-Feltóthy	100 metre backstroke	1:02.80	26	Did not advance			
Eszter Szabó-Feltóthy	200 metre backstroke	2:10.95	4 Q	2:09.42	3 Q	2:09.76	4
Nikolett Pádár; Minna Ábrahám; Dóra Molnár; Ajna Késely	4 × 200 m freestyle relay	7:57.46	5 Q	—		7:56.58	8
Lora Komoróczy; Eszter Békési; Panna Ugrai; Petra Senánszky	4 × 100 m medley relay	4:05.25	13	—		Did not advance	

Mixed

Athlete	Event	Heat		Semifinal		Final	
Athlete	Event	Time	Rank	Time	Rank	Time	Rank
Ádám Jászó; Eszter Békési; Richárd Márton; Petra Senánszky	4 × 100 m medley relay	3:50.40	13	—		Did not advance	

== Water polo ==
Summary

Team	Event	Group stage				Playoff	Quarterfinal	Semifinal	Final / BM	
Team	Event	Opposition Score	Opposition Score	Opposition Score	Rank	Opposition Score	Opposition Score	Opposition Score	Opposition Score	Rank
Hungary	Men's tournament	Romania; W 15–8	Italy; W 15–14	Kazakhstan; W 28–1	1 QF	Bye	France; L 10–11	Serbia; L 10–11	Montenegro; W 18–16	7
Hungary	Women's tournament	New Zealand; W 19–8	Singapore; W 39–2	Australia; W 13–9	1 QF	Bye	Netherlands; W 13–12	Greece; W 13–11	United States; L 7-8	2nd place, silver medalist(s)

=== Men's tournament ===
Team roster

The following is the Hungarian roster.

Head coach: Zsolt Varga

- 1 Soma Vogel GK
- 2 Dániel Angyal FP
- 3 Krisztián Manhercz FP
- 4 Zoltán Pohl FP
- 5 Márton Vámos FP
- 6 Ádám Nagy FP
- 7 Gergő Zalánki FP
- 8 Gergő Fekete FP
- 9 Toni Német FP
- 10 Dénes Varga FP
- 11 Szilárd Jansik FP
- 12 Péter Kovács FP
- 13 Márk Bányai GK
- 14 Vince Vigvári FP
- 15 Dávid Tátrai FP

Group play

Pos	Team	Pld	W	PSW	PSL	L	GF	GA	GD	Pts	Qualification
1	Hungary	3	2	1	0	0	52	18	+34	8	Quarterfinals
2	Italy	3	2	0	1	0	58	22	+36	7	Playoffs
3	Romania	3	1	0	0	2	43	34	+9	3	Playoffs
4	Kazakhstan	3	0	0	0	3	7	86	−79	0	13–16th place semifinals

Source: World Aquatics
Rules for classification: 1) points; 2) head-to-head points; 3) head-to-head goal difference; 4) head-to-head number of goals scored; 5) Goal difference.

5 February 2024; 20:30	Report	Romania	8–15	Hungary	Aspire Dome, Doha; Referees: Xavi Buch (ESP), Sébastien Dervieux (FRA)
5 February 2024; 20:30	Report	Score by quarters: 2–5, 2–5, 3–2, 1–3			Aspire Dome, Doha; Referees: Xavi Buch (ESP), Sébastien Dervieux (FRA)
5 February 2024; 20:30	Report	Fulea, Georgescu 2	Goals	Vámos, Zalánki 3	Aspire Dome, Doha; Referees: Xavi Buch (ESP), Sébastien Dervieux (FRA)

7 February 2024; 20:30	Report	Hungary	15–14	Italy	Aspire Dome, Doha; Referees: Georgios Stavridis (GRE), Frank Ohme (GER)
7 February 2024; 20:30	Report	Score by quarters: 2–2, 2–2, 3–3, 2–2 PSO: 6–5			Aspire Dome, Doha; Referees: Georgios Stavridis (GRE), Frank Ohme (GER)
7 February 2024; 20:30	Report	three players 2	Goals	Di Fulvio 3	Aspire Dome, Doha; Referees: Georgios Stavridis (GRE), Frank Ohme (GER)

9 February 2024; 10:30	Report	Kazakhstan	1–28	Hungary	Aspire Dome, Doha; Referees: Hélène Painchaud (CAN), Cheng Beng Guan (SGP)
9 February 2024; 10:30	Report	Score by quarters: 0–8, 0–5, 0–8, 1–7			Aspire Dome, Doha; Referees: Hélène Painchaud (CAN), Cheng Beng Guan (SGP)
9 February 2024; 10:30	Report	Yeremin 1	Goals	Vigvári 5	Aspire Dome, Doha; Referees: Hélène Painchaud (CAN), Cheng Beng Guan (SGP)

Quarterfinals

13 February 2024; 20:30	Report	Hungary	10–11	France	Aspire Dome, Doha; Referees: Xavi Buch (ESP), Darren Spiritosanto (USA)
13 February 2024; 20:30	Report	Score by quarters: 4–2, 3–1, 1–3, 2–5			Aspire Dome, Doha; Referees: Xavi Buch (ESP), Darren Spiritosanto (USA)
13 February 2024; 20:30	Report	Zalánki 3	Goals	Vernoux 5	Aspire Dome, Doha; Referees: Xavi Buch (ESP), Darren Spiritosanto (USA)

5–8th place semifinals

15 February 2024; 14:30	Report	Serbia	11–10	Hungary	Aspire Dome, Doha; Referees: Andrei Franulovic (CRO), Darren Spiritosanto (USA)
15 February 2024; 14:30	Report	Score by quarters: 5–2, 2–5, 2–1, 2–2			Aspire Dome, Doha; Referees: Andrei Franulovic (CRO), Darren Spiritosanto (USA)
15 February 2024; 14:30	Report	S. Rašović 3	Goals	Zalánki 3	Aspire Dome, Doha; Referees: Andrei Franulovic (CRO), Darren Spiritosanto (USA)

Seventh place game

17 February 2024; 10:00	Report	Montenegro	16–18	Hungary	Aspire Dome, Doha; Referees: Alessandro Severo (ITA), Andreia Stanojević (SRB)
17 February 2024; 10:00	Report	Score by quarters: 3–4, 3–2, 3–3, 5–5 PSO: 2–4			Aspire Dome, Doha; Referees: Alessandro Severo (ITA), Andreia Stanojević (SRB)
17 February 2024; 10:00	Report	Vujović 4	Goals	Zalánki 4	Aspire Dome, Doha; Referees: Alessandro Severo (ITA), Andreia Stanojević (SRB)

=== Women's tournament ===
Team roster

The following is the Hungarian roster.

Head coach: Attila Mihók

- 1 Alda Magyari GK
- 2 Dorottya Szilágyi FP
- 3 Vanda Vályi FP
- 4 Gréta Gurisatti FP
- 5 Géraldine Mahieu FP
- 6 Rebecca Parkes FP
- 7 Zsuzsanna Máté FP
- 8 Rita Keszthelyi FP
- 9 Dóra Leimeter FP
- 10 Natasa Rybanska FP
- 11 Kamilla Faragó FP
- 12 Krisztina Garda FP
- 13 Boglárka Neszmély GK
- 14 Brigitta Horváth FP
- 15 Szonja Kuna FP

Group play

Pos	Team	Pld	W	PSW	PSL	L	GF	GA	GD	Pts	Qualification
1	Hungary	3	3	0	0	0	71	19	+52	9	Quarterfinals
2	Australia	3	2	0	0	1	54	20	+34	6	Playoffs
3	New Zealand	3	1	0	0	2	44	36	+8	3	Playoffs
4	Singapore	3	0	0	0	3	7	101	−94	0	13–16th place semifinals

Source: World Aquatics
Rules for classification: 1) points; 2) head-to-head points; 3) head-to-head goal difference; 4) head-to-head number of goals scored; 5) Goal difference.

4 February 2024; 15:00	Report	Hungary	19–8	New Zealand	Aspire Dome, Doha; Referees: Asumi Tsuzaki (JPN), Natalia Markopoulou (GRE)
4 February 2024; 15:00	Report	Score by quarters: 5–2, 4–2, 2–1, 8–3			Aspire Dome, Doha; Referees: Asumi Tsuzaki (JPN), Natalia Markopoulou (GRE)
4 February 2024; 15:00	Report	Gurisatti 6	Goals	McDowall 4	Aspire Dome, Doha; Referees: Asumi Tsuzaki (JPN), Natalia Markopoulou (GRE)

6 February 2024; 13:30	Report	Singapore	2–39	Hungary	Aspire Dome, Doha; Referees: Lucas Letshabo (RSA), Giuliana Nicolosi (ITA)
6 February 2024; 13:30	Report	Score by quarters: 0–11, 0–7, 2–11, 0–10			Aspire Dome, Doha; Referees: Lucas Letshabo (RSA), Giuliana Nicolosi (ITA)
6 February 2024; 13:30	Report	Yap 2	Goals	Gurisatti, Rybanska 6	Aspire Dome, Doha; Referees: Lucas Letshabo (RSA), Giuliana Nicolosi (ITA)

8 February 2024; 13:30	Report	Hungary	13–9	Australia	Aspire Dome, Doha; Referees: Xavi Buch (ESP), Natalia Markopoulou (GRE)
8 February 2024; 13:30	Report	Score by quarters: 4–2, 4–3, 3–1, 2–3			Aspire Dome, Doha; Referees: Xavi Buch (ESP), Natalia Markopoulou (GRE)
8 February 2024; 13:30	Report	Keszthelyi 5	Goals	Williams 3	Aspire Dome, Doha; Referees: Xavi Buch (ESP), Natalia Markopoulou (GRE)

Quarterfinals

12 February 2024; 19:00	Report	Hungary	13–12	Netherlands	Aspire Dome, Doha; Referees: Sébastien Dervieux (FRA), Jennifer McCall (USA)
12 February 2024; 19:00	Report	Score by quarters: 1–1, 3–1, 1–2, 3–4 PSO: 5–4			Aspire Dome, Doha; Referees: Sébastien Dervieux (FRA), Jennifer McCall (USA)
12 February 2024; 19:00	Report	Keszthelyi 3	Goals	three players 2	Aspire Dome, Doha; Referees: Sébastien Dervieux (FRA), Jennifer McCall (USA)

Semifinals

14 February 2024; 17:30	Report	Hungary	13–11	Greece	Aspire Dome, Doha; Referees: Frank Ohme (GER), Zhang Liang (CHN)
14 February 2024; 17:30	Report	Score by quarters: 3–3, 3–3, 1–1, 2–2 PSO: 4–2			Aspire Dome, Doha; Referees: Frank Ohme (GER), Zhang Liang (CHN)
14 February 2024; 17:30	Report	Parkes 3	Goals	Ninou 4	Aspire Dome, Doha; Referees: Frank Ohme (GER), Zhang Liang (CHN)

Final

16 February 2024; 17:30	Report	United States	8–7	Hungary	Aspire Dome, Doha; Referees: Xavi Buch (ESP), Natalia Markopoulou (GRE)
16 February 2024; 17:30	Report	Score by quarters: 3–2, 2–2, 0–1, 3–2			Aspire Dome, Doha; Referees: Xavi Buch (ESP), Natalia Markopoulou (GRE)
16 February 2024; 17:30	Report	Fattal 3	Goals	Garda, Keszthelyi 2	Aspire Dome, Doha; Referees: Xavi Buch (ESP), Natalia Markopoulou (GRE)
