= Malaysia at the 2024 World Aquatics Championships =

- Flag of Malaysia
- FINA code: MAS
- National federation: Malaysia Swimming Federation
- Website: malaysiaswimming.org

in Doha, Qatar
- Competitors: 16 in 2 sports
- Medals: Gold 0 Silver 0 Bronze 0 Total 0

World Aquatics Championships appearances
- 1973; 1975; 1978; 1982; 1986; 1991; 1994; 1998; 2001; 2003; 2005; 2007; 2009; 2011; 2013; 2015; 2017; 2019; 2022; 2023; 2024

Malaysia competed at the 2024 World Aquatics Championships in Doha, Qatar from 2 to 18 February.

== Competitors ==
The following is the list of competitors in the Championships.

Sport	Men	Women	Total
Diving	6	6	12
Swimming	3	1	4
Total	9	7	16

== Diving ==
Men

Athlete	Event	Preliminaries		Semifinals		Final	
Athlete	Event	Points	Rank	Points	Rank	Points	Rank
Enrique Harold	10 m platform	340.40	27	Did not advance			
Jellson Jabillin	10 m platform	318.10	32	Did not advance			
Hanis Jaya Surya	1 m springboard	258.00	31	—		Did not advance	
Ooi Tze Liang	3 m springboard	352.10	23	Did not advance			
Syafiq Puteh	3 m springboard	296.35	45	Did not advance			
Ooi Tze Liang; Syafiq Puteh	3 m synchro springboard	—				333.57	14
Bertrand Rhodict Lises; Enrique Harold	10 m synchro platform	—				355.71	9

Women

Athlete	Event	Preliminaries		Semifinals		Final	
Athlete	Event	Points	Rank	Points	Rank	Points	Rank
Nur Eilisha Rania Muhammad Abrar Raj	10 m platform	167.55	44	Did not advance			
Kimberly Bong	1 m springboard	205.80	26	—		Did not advance	
Ng Yan Yee	3 m springboard	216.00	38	Did not advance			
Ong Ker Ying	1 m springboard	198.00	31	—		Did not advance	
Pandelela Rinong	10 m platform	231.15	29	Did not advance			
Nur Dhabitah Sabri	3 m springboard	238.15	24	Did not advance			
Ng Yan Yee; Nur Dhabitah Sabri	3 m synchro springboard	—				258.30	9
Pandelela Rinong; Nur Dhabitah Sabri	10 m synchro platform	—				240.06	12

Mixed

Athlete	Event	Final	
Athlete	Event	Points	Rank
Kimberly Bong; Bertrand Rhodict Lises; Nur Eilisha Rania Muhammad Abrar Raj; Hanis Jaya Surya	Team event	245.90	11

== Swimming ==
Malaysia entered 4 swimmers.

Men

Athlete	Event	Heat		Semifinal		Final	
Athlete	Event	Time	Rank	Time	Rank	Time	Rank
Khiew Hoe Yean	200 metre freestyle	1:49.14	32	Did not advance			
Khiew Hoe Yean	400 metre freestyle	3:49.14	21	—		Did not advance	
Khiew Hoe Yean	800 metre freestyle	8:02.78 NR	28	—		Did not advance	
Khiew Hoe Yean	1500 metre freestyle	15:31.23	25	—		Did not advance	
Bryan Leong	100 metre butterfly	52.78 NR	21	Did not advance			
Tan Khai Xin	200 metre individual medley	2:05.08	30	Did not advance			
Tan Khai Xin	400 metre individual medley	4:25.16	18	—		Did not advance	

Women

Athlete	Event	Heat		Semifinal		Final	
Athlete	Event	Time	Rank	Time	Rank	Time	Rank
Phee Jinq En	50 metre breaststroke	32.70	30	Did not advance			
Phee Jinq En	100 metre breaststroke	1:11.31	35	Did not advance			
