= North Korea at the 2024 World Aquatics Championships =

- Flag of North Korea
- FINA code: PRK
- National federation: North Korean Aquatics Federation

in Doha, Qatar
- Competitors: 5 in 1 sport
- Medals Ranked 25th: Gold 0 Silver 2 Bronze 0 Total 2

World Aquatics Championships appearances
- 1973; 1975; 1978; 1982; 1986; 1991; 1994; 1998; 2001; 2003; 2005; 2007; 2009; 2011; 2013; 2015; 2017; 2019; 2022; 2023; 2024

North Korea competed at the 2024 World Aquatics Championships in Doha, Qatar from 2 to 18 February.

== Medalists ==
Medal	Name	Sport	Event	Date
2nd place, silver medalist(s)	Im Yong-myong; Jo Jin-mi	Diving	Mixed synchronized 10 metre platform	3 February 2024
2nd place, silver medalist(s)	Jo Jin-mi; Kim Mi-rae	Diving	Women's synchronized 10 metre platform	6 February 2024

== Competitors ==
The following is the list of competitors in the Championships.

Sport	Men	Women	Total
Diving	2	3	5
Total	2	3	5

== Diving ==
Men

Athlete	Event	Preliminaries		Semifinals		Final	
Athlete	Event	Points	Rank	Points	Rank	Points	Rank
Im Yong-myong	10 m platform	416.60	8 Q	383.45	14	Did not advance	
Ko Che-won	10 m platform	281.20	37	Did not advance			
Im Yong-myong; Ko Che-won	10 m synchro platform	—				372.96	8

Women

Athlete	Event	Preliminaries		Semifinals		Final	
Athlete	Event	Points	Rank	Points	Rank	Points	Rank
Kim Mi-rae	10 m platform	295.50	11 Q	325.20	3 Q	349.10	4
Kim Hui-yon	10 m platform	228.35	31	Did not advance			
Jo Jin-mi; Kim Mi-rae	3 m synchro springboard	—				320.70	2nd place, silver medalist(s)

Mixed

Athlete	Event	Final	
Athlete	Event	Points	Rank
Im Yong-myong; Jo Jin-mi	10 m platform	303.96	2nd place, silver medalist(s)
Jo Jin-mi; Im Yong-myong; Ko Che-won; Kim Hui-yon	Team event	320.85	7
