= Swimming at the 2024 World Aquatics Championships – Men's 100 metre butterfly =

Men's 100 metre butterfly at the Swimming at the 2024 World Aquatics Championships
- Venue: Aspire Dome
- Location: Doha, Qatar
- Dates: 16 February (heats and semifinals); 17 February (final)
- Competitors: 66 from 63 nations
- Winning time: 51.17

Medalists
gold medal	Diogo Ribeiro	Portugal
silver medal	Simon Bucher	Austria
bronze medal	Jakub Majerski	Poland

The Men's 100 metre butterfly competition at the 2024 World Aquatics Championships was held on 16 and 17 February 2024.

== Qualification ==
Each National Federation was permitted to enter a maximum of two qualified athletes in each individual event, but only if both of them had attained the "A" standard qualification time at approved qualifying events. For this event, the "A" standard qualification time was 51.96 seconds. Federations could enter one athlete into the event if they met the "B" standard qualification time. For this event, the "B" standard qualification time was 53.78. Athletes could also enter the event if they had met an "A" or "B" standard in a different event and their Federation had not entered anyone else. Additional considerations applied to Federations who had few swimmers enter through the standard qualification times. Federations in this category could at least enter two men and two women into the competition, all of whom could enter into up to two events.

== Records ==
Prior to the competition, the existing world and championship records were as follows.

World record	Caeleb Dressel (USA)	49.45	Tokyo, Japan	31 July 2021
Competition record	Caeleb Dressel (USA)	49.50	Gwangju, South Korea	26 July 2019

== Results ==
=== Heats ===
The heats were started on 16 February at 09:31.

Rank	Heat	Lane	Name	Nationality	Time	Notes
1	8	5	Simon Bucher	Austria	51.42	Q
2	6	4	Katsuhiro Matsumoto	Japan	51.60	Q
3	8	4	Nyls Korstanje	Netherlands	51.70	Q
4	7	6	Adilbek Mussin	Kazakhstan	51.75	Q
5	8	3	Diogo Ribeiro	Portugal	51.78	Q
6	6	3	Zach Harting	United States	51.94	Q
7	6	5	Jakub Majerski	Poland	51.96	Q
8	7	5	Chad le Clos	South Africa	52.04	Q
8	8	7	Finlay Knox	Canada	52.04	Q
10	7	3	Josif Miladinov	Bulgaria	52.10	Q
11	6	2	Mario Molla	Spain	52.12	Q
12	7	4	Shaine Casas	United States	52.21	Q
13	6	6	Adrian Jaśkiewicz	Poland	52.31	Q
14	7	2	Matheus Gonche	Brazil	52.44	Q
15	7	7	Gianmarco Sansone	Italy	52.46	Q
16	8	6	Matthew Sates	South Africa	52.52	SO
16	8	9	Max McCusker	Ireland	52.52	SO
18	8	8	Teong Tzen Wei	Singapore	52.62	
19	5	4	David Arias	Colombia	52.72	
20	6	1	Daniel Gracík	Czech Republic	52.77	
21	7	9	Bryan Leong	Malaysia	52.78	NR
22	5	9	Đurđe Matić	Serbia	52.81	
23	6	7	Eldor Usmonov	Uzbekistan	52.83	
24	6	0	Jorge Otaiza	Venezuela	53.10	
24	8	0	Wang Xizhe	China	53.10	
26	6	9	Navaphat Wongcharoen	Thailand	53.27	
27	5	2	Abdalla Nasr	Egypt	53.31	
28	5	8	Mehrshad Afghari	Iran	53.32	
29	5	3	Denys Kesil	Ukraine	53.57	
30	8	1	Jorge Iga	Mexico	53.58	
31	5	1	Diego Balbi	Peru	53.62	
32	7	0	Jarod Hatch	Philippines	53.75	
33	4	6	Benjamin Schnapp	Chile	53.77	NR
34	5	5	Jaouad Syoud	Algeria	53.96	
35	5	6	Joe Kurniawan	Indonesia	53.97	
36	4	7	Artur Barseghyan	Armenia	54.22	
37	4	4	Steven Aimable	Senegal	54.23	
38	5	0	Abeku Jackson	Ghana	54.28	
39	4	5	Jesse Ssengonzi	Uganda	54.48	
40	4	2	Nika Tchitchiashvili	Georgia	54.71	
41	4	1	Josh Kirlew	Jamaica	54.75	
42	4	9	Ramil Valizade	Azerbaijan	54.88	
43	4	3	Tibor Tistan	Slovakia	55.27	
44	6	8	Yang Jae-hoon	South Korea	55.39	
45	1	3	Leo Nolles	Uruguay	55.86	
45	3	4	Jayhan Odlum-Smith	Saint Lucia	55.86	
47	3	2	Raekwon Noel	Guyana	56.24	
48	4	8	Esteban Nuñez	Bolivia	56.68	
49	3	6	Clinton Opute	Nigeria	56.95	
50	3	3	Zackary Gresham	Grenada	57.26	
51	3	5	Marvin Johnson	Bahamas	57.29	
52	3	8	Lam Chi Chong	Macau	57.39	
53	2	1	Mohammad Al-Otaibi	Kuwait	58.47	
54	3	1	Jeno Heyns	Suriname	58.51	
55	3	9	Mohamad Masoud	Athlete Refugee Team	58.61	
56	2	5	Finau Ohuafi	Tonga	58.62	
57	3	0	Paolo Priska	Albania	59.01	
57	3	7	James Hendrix	Guam	59.01	
59	2	3	Kokoro Frost	Samoa	59.75	
60	2	4	Hasan Al-Zinkee	Iraq	59.77	
61	2	2	Thomas Chen	Papua New Guinea	1:00.66	
62	2	6	Kinley Lhendup	Bhutan	1:01.87	
63	1	5	Abdul Al-Kulaibi	Oman	1:02.36	
64	2	7	Elhadj Diallo	Guinea	1:03.53	
65	2	8	Aaron Owusu	Eritrea	1:05.63	
66	1	4	Yusuf Nasser	Yemen	1:12.93	
	4	0	Miloš Milenković	Montenegro	Did not start	
	5	7	Yeziel Morales	Puerto Rico	Did not start	
	7	1	Cameron Gray	New Zealand	Did not start	
	7	8	Konstantinos Stamou	Greece	Did not start	
	8	2	Tomoru Honda	Japan	Did not start	

=== Swim-off ===
The swim-off was started on 16 February at 11:38.

Rank	Lane	Name	Nationality	Time	Notes
1	4	Matthew Sates	South Africa	51.80	Q
2	5	Max McCusker	Ireland	52.31	NR

=== Semifinals ===
The semifinals were held on 16 February at 19:09.

Rank	Heat	Lane	Name	Nationality	Time	Notes
1	2	3	Diogo Ribeiro	Portugal	51.30	Q, NR
2	2	6	Jakub Majerski	Poland	51.33	Q
3	2	4	Simon Bucher	Austria	51.39	Q
4	2	7	Mario Molla	Spain	51.48	Q
5	1	6	Chad le Clos	South Africa	51.70	Q
6	1	2	Josif Miladinov	Bulgaria	51.72	Q
7	2	5	Nyls Korstanje	Netherlands	51.75	Q
8	1	3	Zach Harting	United States	51.78	Q
9	1	4	Katsuhiro Matsumoto	Japan	51.85	
10	1	8	Matthew Sates	South Africa	51.99	
11	1	5	Adilbek Mussin	Kazakhstan	52.06	
12	2	2	Finlay Knox	Canada	52.07	
13	1	1	Matheus Gonche	Brazil	52.12	
14	2	8	Gianmarco Sansone	Italy	52.15	
15	2	1	Adrian Jaśkiewicz	Poland	52.28	
16	1	7	Shaine Casas	United States	52.75	

=== Final ===
The final was held on 17 February at 19:42.

Rank	Lane	Name	Nationality	Time	Notes
1st place, gold medalist(s)	4	Diogo Ribeiro	Portugal	51.17	NR
2nd place, silver medalist(s)	3	Simon Bucher	Austria	51.28	
3rd place, bronze medalist(s)	5	Jakub Majerski	Poland	51.32	
4	1	Nyls Korstanje	Netherlands	51.41	
5	2	Chad le Clos	South Africa	51.48	
6	8	Zach Harting	United States	51.68	
7	6	Mario Molla	Spain	51.72	
8	7	Josif Miladinov	Bulgaria	51.73	

== Sources ==
- "Competition Regulations" (PDF). World Aquatics. Archived (PDF) from the original on 15 February 2026.
