= Swimming at the 2024 World Aquatics Championships – Men's 800 metre freestyle =

Men's 800 metre freestyle at the 2024 World Aquatics Championships
- Venue: Aspire Dome
- Location: Doha, Qatar
- Dates: 13 February (heats); 14 February (final)
- Competitors: 43 from 36 nations
- Winning time: 7:40.94

Medalists
gold medal	Daniel Wiffen	Ireland
silver medal	Elijah Winnington	Australia
bronze medal	Gregorio Paltrinieri	Italy

The men's 800 metre freestyle competition at the 2024 World Aquatics Championships was held on 13 and 14 February 2024.

== Qualification ==
Each National Federation was permitted to enter a maximum of two qualified athletes in each individual event, but only if both of them had attained the "A" standard qualification time at approved qualifying events. For this event, the "A" standard qualification time was 7:53.11. Federations could enter one athlete into the event if they met the "B" standard qualification time. For this event, the "B" standard qualification time was 8:09.67. Athletes could also enter the event if they had met an "A" or "B" standard in a different event and their Federation had not entered anyone else. Additional considerations applied to Federations who had few swimmers enter through the standard qualification times. Federations in this category could at least enter two men and two women into the competition, all of whom could enter into up to two events.

== Records ==
Prior to the competition, the existing world and championship records were as follows.

World record	Zhang Lin (CHN)	7:32.12	Rome, Italy	26 July 2009
Competition record	Zhang Lin (CHN)	7:32.12	Rome, Italy	26 July 2009

== Results ==
=== Heats ===
The heats were started on 13 February at 10:22

Rank	Heat	Lane	Name	Nationality	Time	Notes
1	4	2	Luca De Tullio	Italy	7:46.52	Q
2	4	4	Daniel Wiffen	Ireland	7:46.90	Q
3	5	5	Sven Schwarz	Germany	7:46.95	Q
4	4	9	Victor Johansson	Sweden	7:47.04	Q, NR
5	5	1	Kristóf Rasovszky	Hungary	7:47.19	Q
6	5	3	Mykhailo Romanchuk	Ukraine	7:47.20	Q
7	4	3	Gregorio Paltrinieri	Italy	7:47.38	Q
8	5	6	Elijah Winnington	Australia	7:47.59	Q
9	5	7	David Betlehem	Hungary	7:48.06	
10	4	5	Florian Wellbrock	Germany	7:48.17	
11	3	7	David Johnston	United States	7:48.20	
12	5	8	Kuzey Tunçelli	Turkey	7:48.53	NR
13	4	1	Alfonso Mestre	Venezuela	7:48.84	
14	2	4	Dimitrios Markos	Greece	7:49.97	NR
15	3	3	Carlos Garach Benito	Spain	7:50.56	
16	3	1	Fei Liwei	China	7:51.18	
17	5	0	Henrik Christiansen	Norway	7:51.21	
18	5	4	Ahmed Hafnaoui	Tunisia	7:51.72	
19	2	3	Lucas Henveaux	Belgium	7:52.10	NR
20	4	7	Damien Joly	France	7:53.42	
21	3	8	Ilia Sibirtsev	Uzbekistan	7:53.87	NR
22	3	5	Charlie Clark	United States	7:54.87	
23	5	9	Zhang Zhanshuo	China	7:55.86	
24	4	8	Jon Joentvedt	Norway	7:56.28	
25	3	9	Shogo Takeda	Japan	7:57.54	
26	3	6	Felix Auböck	Austria	7:57.63	
27	4	6	Guilherme Costa	Brazil	7:58.02	
28	2	2	Khiew Hoe Yean	Malaysia	8:02.78	NR
29	3	2	Nguyễn Huy Hoàng	Vietnam	8:05.17	
30	2	6	Dylan Porges	Mexico	8:05.83	
31	4	0	Vlad Stancu	Romania	8:06.50	
32	2	1	Ratthawit Thammananthachote	Thailand	8:06.82	NR
33	3	4	Marc-Antoine Olivier	France	8:08.54	
34	2	7	Glen Lim Jun Wei	Singapore	8:09.34	
35	3	0	Juan Morales	Colombia	8:11.31	
36	2	8	Diego Dulieu	Honduras	8:11.97	
37	2	9	Loris Bianchi	San Marino	8:17.70	NR
38	1	4	Ilias El Fallaki	Morocco	8:27.22	
39	1	5	Alberto Vega	Costa Rica	8:30.93	
40	1	3	Liggjas Joensen	Faroe Islands	8:32.54	
41	1	6	Mal Gashi	Kosovo	8:35.97	
42	2	0	Rodolfo Falcón Jr.	Cuba	8:38.90	
43	1	2	Mohammed Al-Zaki	Saudi Arabia	9:06.29	
	2	5	Antonio Djakovic	Switzerland	Did not start	
	5	2	Kim Woo-min	South Korea	Did not start	

=== Final ===
The final was started on 14 February at 19:02.

Rank	Lane	Name	Nationality	Time	Notes
1st place, gold medalist(s)	5	Daniel Wiffen	Ireland	7:40.94	
2nd place, silver medalist(s)	8	Elijah Winnington	Australia	7:42.95	
3rd place, bronze medalist(s)	1	Gregorio Paltrinieri	Italy	7:42.98	
4	3	Sven Schwarz	Germany	7:44.29	
5	2	Kristóf Rasovszky	Hungary	7:44.42	NR
6	6	Victor Johansson	Sweden	7:47.08	
7	4	Luca De Tullio	Italy	7:49.79	
8	7	Mykhailo Romanchuk	Ukraine	7:54.51	

== Sources ==
- "Competition Regulations" (PDF). World Aquatics. Archived (PDF) from the original on 15 February 2026.
