= Swimming at the 2024 World Aquatics Championships – Men's 200 metre freestyle =

Men's 200 metre freestyle at the Swimming at the 2024 World Aquatics Championships
- Venue: Aspire Dome
- Location: Doha, Qatar
- Dates: 12 February (heats and semifinals); 13 February (final)
- Competitors: 67 from 60 nations
- Winning time: 1:44.75

Medalists
gold medal	Hwang Sun-woo	South Korea
silver medal	Danas Rapšys	Lithuania
bronze medal	Luke Hobson	United States

The Men's 200 metre freestyle competition at the 2024 World Aquatics Championships was held on 12 and 13 February 2024.

== Qualification ==
Each National Federation was permitted to enter a maximum of two qualified athletes in each individual event, but only if both of them had attained the "A" standard qualification time at approved qualifying events. For this event, the "A" standard qualification time was 1:47.06. Federations could enter one athlete into the event if they met the "B" standard qualification time. For this event, the "B" standard qualification time was 1:50.81. Athletes could also enter the event if they had met an "A" or "B" standard in a different event and their Federation had not entered anyone else. Additional considerations applied to Federations who had few swimmers enter through the standard qualification times. Federations in this category could at least enter two men and two women into the competition, all of whom could enter into up to two events.

== Records ==
Prior to the competition, the existing world and championship records were as follows.

World record	Paul Biedermann (GER)	1:42.00	Rome, Italy	28 July 2009
Competition record	Paul Biedermann (GER)	1:42.00	Rome, Italy	28 July 2009

== Results ==
=== Heats ===
The heats were started on 12 February at 10:21.

Rank	Heat	Lane	Name	Nationality	Time	Notes
1	6	4	Lukas Märtens	Germany	1:45.74	Q
2	5	3	Rafael Miroslaw	Germany	1:45.89	Q
3	7	3	Danas Rapšys	Lithuania	1:45.95	Q
4	6	5	Duncan Scott	Great Britain	1:46.09	Q
5	5	4	Luke Hobson	United States	1:46.54	Q
6	6	1	Elijah Winnington	Australia	1:46.69	Q
7	6	3	Kai Taylor	Australia	1:46.81	Q
8	7	5	Katsuhiro Matsumoto	Japan	1:46.84	Q
9	6	2	Lucas Henveaux	Belgium	1:46.93	Q
10	5	5	Lee Ho-joon	South Korea	1:46.97	Q
11	7	4	Hwang Sun-woo	South Korea	1:46.99	Q
12	7	7	Ji Xinjie	China	1:47.13	Q
13	6	0	Kamil Sieradzki	Poland	1:47.25	Q
14	7	1	Guilherme Costa	Brazil	1:47.28	Q
15	7	6	Felix Auböck	Austria	1:47.30	Q
16	5	6	Denis Loktev	Israel	1:47.37	Q
17	5	0	César Castro	Spain	1:47.40	
18	7	2	Fernando Scheffer	Brazil	1:47.42	
19	7	0	Nándor Németh	Hungary	1:47.52	
20	4	4	Kregor Zirk	Estonia	1:47.54	
21	6	8	Velimir Stjepanović	Serbia	1:47.55	
22	5	1	Jorge Iga	Mexico	1:47.56	
22	5	8	Robin Hanson	Sweden	1:47.56	
24	7	8	Matteo Ciampi	Italy	1:47.65	
25	5	2	Antonio Djakovic	Switzerland	1:47.67	
26	5	7	Jack McMillan	Great Britain	1:47.85	
27	6	9	Matthew Sates	South Africa	1:47.98	
28	4	6	Niko Janković	Croatia	1:48.39	
29	6	6	Marco De Tullio	Italy	1:48.46	
30	7	9	Alfonso Mestre	Venezuela	1:48.74	
31	4	5	Javier Acevedo	Canada	1:48.89	
32	4	3	Khiew Hoe Yean	Malaysia	1:49.14	
33	5	9	Sašo Boškan	Slovenia	1:49.66	
34	4	2	Glen Lim Jun Wei	Singapore	1:49.71	
35	3	4	Ondrej Gemov	Czech Republic	1:49.78	
35	4	1	Wesley Roberts	Cook Islands	1:49.78	
37	3	5	František Jablcnik	Slovakia	1:50.88	
38	6	7	Pan Zhanle	China	1:51.03	
39	3	7	Tanish Mathew	India	1:51.68	
40	2	5	Reds Rullis	Latvia	1:52.42	
41	4	0	Yordan Yanchev	Bulgaria	1:52.43	
42	3	1	Rafael Ponce	Peru	1:52.75	
43	4	8	Max Mannes	Luxembourg	1:52.76	
44	2	3	Enkhtamir Batbayar	Mongolia	1:52.96	
45	4	7	Dulyawat Kaewsriyong	Thailand	1:53.01	
46	4	9	Ngô Đình Chuyền	Vietnam	1:53.64	
47	1	2	Alex Sobers	Barbados	1:53.93	
48	3	9	Matthieu Seye	Senegal	1:54.16	
49	1	3	Oliver Durand	Namibia	1:54.22	
50	3	2	Omar Abbass	Syria	1:54.28	
51	3	8	Egor Covaliov	Moldova	1:54.43	
52	2	6	Henrique Mascarenhas	Angola	1:54.82	
53	2	4	Anthony Piñeiro	Dominican Republic	1:55.85	
54	2	2	Monyo Maina	Kenya	1:56.15	
55	3	3	James Richard Allison	Cayman Islands	1:56.18	
56	2	7	Isaac Beitia	Panama	1:56.31	
57	2	8	Nasir Hussain	Nepal	1:56.39	NR
58	1	7	Zaid Al-Sarraj	Saudi Arabia	1:57.85	
59	2	0	Khaled Al-Otaibi	Kuwait	1:58.02	
60	3	6	Ryan Barbe	Morocco	1:58.07	
61	2	1	Mahmoud Abu Gharbieh	Palestine	1:58.24	
62	3	0	Luka Kukhalashvili	Georgia	1:58.79	
63	2	9	Kaeden Gleason	U.S. Virgin Islands	1:59.66	
64	1	4	Israel Poppe	Guam	2:02.60	
65	1	5	Sangay Tenzin	Bhutan	2:04.13	
66	1	6	Mohamed Shiham	Maldives	2:06.32	
67	1	1	Ali Abdulla Al-Nuaimi	Qatar	2:07.82	

=== Semifinals ===
The semifinals were held on 12 February at 20:11.

Rank	Heat	Lane	Name	Nationality	Time	Notes
1	2	5	Danas Rapšys	Lithuania	1:44.96	Q
2	2	7	Hwang Sun-woo	South Korea	1:45.15	Q
3	2	4	Lukas Märtens	Germany	1:45.21	Q
4	2	3	Luke Hobson	United States	1:45.53	Q
5	1	3	Elijah Winnington	Australia	1:45.90	Q
6	1	4	Rafael Miroslaw	Germany	1:45.95	Q
7	1	1	Guilherme Costa	Brazil	1:46.06	Q
8	1	5	Duncan Scott	Great Britain	1:46.24	Q
9	2	6	Kai Taylor	Australia	1:46.37	
10	1	6	Katsuhiro Matsumoto	Japan	1:46.53	
11	2	2	Lucas Henveaux	Belgium	1:46.75	
12	1	7	Ji Xinjie	China	1:46.92	
13	1	8	Denis Loktev	Israel	1:47.11	
14	2	1	Kamil Sieradzki	Poland	1:47.33	
15	1	2	Lee Ho-joon	South Korea	1:47.38	
16	2	8	Felix Auböck	Austria	1:48.03	

=== Final ===
The final was held on 13 February at 19:02.

Rank	Lane	Name	Nationality	Time	Notes
1st place, gold medalist(s)	5	Hwang Sun-woo	South Korea	1:44.75	
2nd place, silver medalist(s)	4	Danas Rapšys	Lithuania	1:45.05	
3rd place, bronze medalist(s)	6	Luke Hobson	United States	1:45.26	
4	3	Lukas Märtens	Germany	1:45.33	
5	7	Rafael Miroslaw	Germany	1:45.84	
6	8	Duncan Scott	Great Britain	1:45.86	
7	2	Elijah Winnington	Australia	1:46.20	
8	1	Guilherme Costa	Brazil	1:46.87	

== Sources ==
- "Competition Regulations" (PDF). World Aquatics. Archived (PDF) from the original on 15 February 2026.
