= Swimming at the 2024 World Aquatics Championships – Men's 50 metre butterfly =

Men's 50 metre butterfly at the 2024 World Aquatics Championships
- Venue: Aspire Dome
- Location: Doha, Qatar
- Dates: 11 February (heats and semifinals); 12 February (final)
- Competitors: 67 from 65 nations
- Winning time: 22.97

Medalists
gold medal	Diogo Ribeiro	Portugal
silver medal	Michael Andrew	United States
bronze medal	Cameron McEvoy	Australia

The Men's 50 metre butterfly competition at the 2024 World Aquatics Championships was held on 11 and 12 February 2024.

== Qualification ==
Each National Federation was permitted to enter a maximum of two qualified athletes in each individual event, but only if both of them had attained the "A" standard qualification time at approved qualifying events. For this event, the "A" standard qualification time was 23.53 seconds. Federations could enter one athlete into the event if they met the "B" standard qualification time. For this event, the "B" standard qualification time was 24.35. Athletes could also enter the event if they had met an "A" or "B" standard in a different event and their Federation had not entered anyone else. Additional considerations applied to Federations who had few swimmers enter through the standard qualification times. Federations in this category could at least enter two men and two women into the competition, all of whom could enter into up to two events.

== Records ==
Prior to the competition, the existing world and championship records were as follows.

World record	Andriy Govorov (UKR)	22.27	Rome, Italy	1 July 2018
Competition record	Caeleb Dressel (USA)	22.35	Gwangju, South Korea	22 July 2019

== Results ==
=== Heats ===
The heats were started on 11 February at 10:31.

Rank	Heat	Lane	Name	Nationality	Time	Notes
1	5	3	Nyls Korstanje	Netherlands	23.02	Q
2	6	4	Michael Andrew	United States	23.03	Q
3	7	6	Isaac Cooper	Australia	23.15	Q
4	5	4	Dylan Carter	Trinidad and Tobago	23.16	Q
5	7	4	Diogo Ribeiro	Portugal	23.18	Q
5	7	7	Nicholas Lia	Norway	23.18	Q, NR
7	5	5	Cameron McEvoy	Australia	23.19	Q
8	5	6	Baek In-chul	South Korea	23.34	Q
9	7	5	Szebasztián Szabó	Hungary	23.35	Q
10	6	1	Shaine Casas	United States	23.37	Q
10	6	3	Mario Molla	Spain	23.37	Q
12	6	9	Nikola Miljenić	Croatia	23.41	Q
13	4	5	Chad le Clos	South Africa	23.47	Q
14	7	8	Daniel Gracík	Czech Republic	23.51	Q
15	4	2	Finlay Knox	Canada	23.52	Q
16	6	5	Simon Bucher	Austria	23.53	SO
16	7	2	Teong Tzen Wei	Singapore	23.53	SO
16	7	3	Stergios Bilas	Greece	23.53	SO
19	5	7	Eldor Usmonov	Uzbekistan	23.54	
20	6	6	Cameron Gray	New Zealand	23.62	
21	6	2	Josif Miladinov	Bulgaria	23.63	
21	6	7	Andrii Govorov	Ukraine	23.63	
23	5	8	Tibor Tistan	Slovakia	23.65	NR
24	5	2	Jakub Majerski	Poland	23.68	
25	6	8	Julien Henx	Luxembourg	23.77	
26	7	0	Shane Ryan	Ireland	23.83	
27	5	0	Jorge Otaiza	Venezuela	23.87	
28	5	1	Federico Burdisso	Italy	23.92	
29	4	0	Đorđe Matić	Serbia	23.97	
30	6	0	Jarod Hatch	Philippines	24.13	
31	5	9	Shinri Shioura	Japan	24.16	
32	4	8	Miloš Milenković	Montenegro	24.17	NR
33	4	4	Nguyễn Hoàng Khang	Vietnam	24.20	
34	4	3	Maxim Skazobtsov	Kazakhstan	24.23	
35	4	9	Mehrshad Afghari	Iran	24.25	
36	4	7	Abeiku Jackson	Ghana	24.29	
37	4	6	Jaouad Syoud	Algeria	24.32	
38	3	3	Jesse Ssengonzi	Uganda	24.41	
39	3	4	Mohamed Mahmoud	Qatar	24.62	
40	7	9	Lamar Taylor	Bahamas	24.85	
41	3	5	Jeancarlo Calderon	Panama	24.95	
42	3	1	Mohamad Masoud	Athlete Refugee Team	25.38	
43	3	6	Adam Moncherry	Seychelles	25.40	
44	3	7	Tristan Dorville	Saint Lucia	25.50	
45	3	0	Lam Chi Chong	Macau	25.74	
46	3	2	Kokoro Frost	Samoa	25.86	
47	3	8	Filippos Iakovidis	Cyprus	26.00	
48	2	4	Irvin Hoost	Suriname	26.38	
49	3	9	Paolo Priska	Albania	26.56	
50	2	5	Phansovannarun Montross	Cambodia	26.93	
51	2	3	Fakhriddin Madkamov	Tajikistan	27.25	
52	1	1	Mohammad Al-Otaibi	Kuwait	27.41	
53	2	6	Katerson Moya	Federated States of Micronesia	27.66	
54	2	2	Travis Sakurai	Palau	28.02	
55	2	7	Souleymane Napare	Burkina Faso	28.22	
56	1	4	Troy Pina	Cape Verde	28.44	
57	2	9	Joshua Wyse	Sierra Leone	28.69	
58	2	1	Houmed Houssein	Djibouti	28.72	
59	1	0	Asher Banda	Malawi	29.51	
60	2	8	Slava Sihanouvong	Laos	29.55	
61	1	7	Ethan Alimanya	Tanzania	30.07	
62	1	5	Charles Avi	Ivory Coast	30.19	
63	1	3	Bereket Girkebo	Ethiopia	30.26	
64	2	0	Pap Jonga	Gambia	30.81	
65	1	6	Yusuf Nasser	Yemen	31.35	
66	1	8	Aristote Ndombe	Democratic Republic of the Congo	31.51	
67	1	2	Ibrahim Mohamed	Comoros	34.35	
	4	1	Andrés Dupont	Mexico	Did not start	
	7	1	Mikkel Lee	Singapore	Did not start	

=== Swim-off ===
The swim-off was started on 11 February at 12:17.

Rank	Lane	Name	Nationality	Time	Notes
1	5	Teong Tzen Wei	Singapore	23.42	Q
2	4	Simon Bucher	Austria	23.54	
3	3	Stergios Bilas	Greece	24.87	

=== Semifinals ===
The semifinals were started on 11 February at 19:23.

Rank	Heat	Lane	Name	Nationality	Time	Notes
1	1	4	Michael Andrew	United States	22.94	Q
2	1	5	Dylan Carter	Trinidad and Tobago	23.15	Q
3	2	7	Mario Molla	Spain	23.17	Q
4	2	3	Diogo Ribeiro	Portugal	23.18	Q
4	2	5	Isaac Cooper	Australia	23.18	Q
6	2	6	Cameron McEvoy	Australia	23.21	Q
7	1	2	Shaine Casas	United States	23.22	Q
8	1	6	Baek In-chul	South Korea	23.24	Q
9	2	4	Nyls Korstanje	Netherlands	23.25	
9	2	8	Finlay Knox	Canada	23.25	NR
11	2	2	Szebasztián Szabó	Hungary	23.32	
12	1	7	Nikola Miljenić	Croatia	23.37	
13	1	1	Daniel Gracík	Czech Republic	23.45	NR
14	1	3	Nicholas Lia	Norway	23.47	
15	1	8	Teong Tzen Wei	Singapore	23.49	
16	2	1	Chad le Clos	South Africa	23.68	

=== Final ===
The final was held on 12 February at 19:46.

Rank	Lane	Name	Nationality	Time	Notes
1st place, gold medalist(s)	6	Diogo Ribeiro	Portugal	22.97	
2nd place, silver medalist(s)	4	Michael Andrew	United States	23.07	
3rd place, bronze medalist(s)	7	Cameron McEvoy	Australia	23.08	
4	2	Isaac Cooper	Australia	23.12	
5	5	Dylan Carter	Trinidad and Tobago	23.17	
6	3	Mario Molla	Spain	23.29	
7	8	Baek In-chul	South Korea	23.35	
8	1	Shaine Casas	United States	23.47	

== Sources ==
- "Competition Regulations" (PDF). World Aquatics. Archived (PDF) from the original on 15 February 2026.
