= Swimming at the 2024 World Aquatics Championships – Mixed 4 × 100 metre medley relay =

Mixed 4 × 100 metre medley relay at the Swimming at the 2024 World Aquatics Championships
- Venue: Aspire Dome
- Location: Doha, Qatar
- Dates: 14 February (heats and final)
- Competitors: 144 from 33 nations
- Teams: 33
- Winning time: 3:40.22

Medalists
gold medal	Hunter Armstrong; Nic Fink; Claire Curzan; Kate Douglass; Jack Aikins; Jake Foster; Rachel Klinker; Addison Sauickie	United States
silver medal	Bradley Woodward; Sam Williamson; Brianna Throssell; Shayna Jack; Alexandria Perkins; Abbey Harkin	Australia
bronze medal	Medi Harris; Adam Peaty; Matthew Richards; Anna Hopkin; James Wilby; Duncan Scott	Great Britain

The Mixed 4 × 100 metre medley relay competition at the 2024 World Aquatics Championships was held on 14 February 2024.

== Records ==
Prior to the competition, the existing world and championship records were as follows.

World record	Great Britain	3:37.58	Tokyo, Japan	31 July 2021
Competition record	United States	3:38.56	Budapest, Hungary	26 July 2017

== Results ==
=== Heats ===
The heats were started at 10:47.

Rank	Heat	Lane	Nation	Swimmers	Time	Notes
1	4	3	Great Britain	Medi Harris (1:00.62); James Wilby (1:00.00); Duncan Scott (52.15); Anna Hopkin (52.73)	3:45.50	Q
2	3	4	Australia	Bradley Woodward (53.89); Sam Williamson (59.49); Alexandria Perkins (57.47); Abbey Harkin (54.69)	3:45.54	Q
3	4	5	United States	Jack Aikins (53.49); Jake Foster (59.29); Rachel Klinker (58.18); Addison Sauickie (54.97)	3:45.93	Q
4	4	7	Greece	Apostolos Christou (53.67); Arkadios Aspougalis (1:00.54); Anna Ntountounaki (57.37); Theodora Drakou (54.96)	3:46.54	Q
5	4	2	Poland	Ksawery Masiuk (53.09); Dominika Sztandera (1:07.28); Adrian Jaśkiewicz (51.63); Kornelia Fiedkiewicz (54.57)	3:46.57	Q
6	4	6	Japan	Osamu Kato (54.30); Ikuru Hiroshima (1:00.44); Chiharu Iitsuka (58.13); Nagisa Ikemoto (54.05)	3:46.92	Q
7	3	6	Sweden	Hanna Rosvall (1:01.21); Erik Persson (1:00.52); Louise Hansson (56.99); Robin Hanson (48.78)	3:47.50	Q
8	3	2	Italy	Michele Lamberti (54.12); Ludovico Viberti (59.63); Giulia D'Innocenzo (59.45); Chiara Tarantino (54.45)	3:47.65	Q
9	3	3	Canada	Blake Tierney (54.12); James Dergousoff (1:01.46); Katerine Savard (58.70); Taylor Ruck (53.71)	3:47.99	
10	4	9	South Africa	Pieter Coetze (53.95); Lara van Niekerk (1:07.23); Erin Gallagher (57.46); Clayton Jimmie (49.39)	3:48.03	
11	4	4	China	Chen Jie (1:02.38); Dong Zhihao (59.18); Yu Yiting (58.27); Ji Xinjie (48.33)	3:48.16	
12	3	7	Spain	Carmen Weiler (1:01.00); Carles Coll (1:00.56); Mario Mollá (51.98); María Daza (55.53)	3:49.07	
13	4	8	Hungary	Ádám Jászó (54.23); Eszter Békési (1:08.99); Richárd Márton (52.69); Petra Senánszky (54.49)	3:50.40	
14	4	1	Singapore	Levenia Sim (1:02.89); Letitia Sim (1:06.94); Tzen Wei Teong (52.26); Mikkel Lee (48.93)	3:51.02	
15	2	5	Lithuania	Erikas Grigaitis (55.49); Rūta Meilutytė (1:07.39); Andrius Ŝidlauskas (53.67); Smilte Plytnykaitė (55.44)	3:51.99	
16	4	0	Philippines	Jerard Jacinto (57.38); Thanya Dela Cruz (1:08.87); Jarod Hatch (53.35); Kayla Sanchez (54.31)	3:53.91	
17	3	1	Kazakhstan	Xeniya Ignatova (1:02.36); Arsen Korzhakhmetov (1:03.32); Sofia Spodarenko (59.51); Adilbek Mussin (49.26)	3:54.45	
18	3	9	Slovakia	Teresa Ivan (1:02.55); František Jablčník (1:04.84); Tibor Tišťan (54.88); Tamara Potocká (55.57)	3:57.84	
19	3	8	Hong Kong	Cindy Cheung (1:02.18); Lau Shiu Yue (1:10.14); Natalie Kan (1:00.00); Ian Ho (50.77)	4:03.09	
20	2	2	Mongolia	Ariuntamir Enkh-Amgalan (1:04.72); Erkhes Enkhtur (1:05.48); Enkhtamir Batbayar (58.42); Batbayaryn Enkhkhüslen (56.47)	4:05.09	NR
21	2	8	India	Suvana Chetana Baskar (1:06.32); Likhith Selvaraj Prema (1:03.53); Tanish George Mathew (56.04); Dhinidhi Desinghu (59.21)	4:05.10	
22	1	6	Cook Islands	Jacob Story (59.91); Lanihei Connolly (1:10.66); Wesley Roberts (54.69); Mia Laban (1:00.54)	4:05.80	
23	3	0	Thailand	Ratthawit Thammananthachote (58.10); Saovanee Boonamphai (1:11.32); Navaphat Wongcharoen (53.71); Jenjira Srisaard (1:02.81)	4:05.94	
24	2	3	Bahamas	Lamar Taylor (56.82); Rhanishka Gibbs (1:12.42); Marvin Johnson (56.94); Victoria Russell (1:00.73)	4:06.91	
25	2	6	Armenia	Artur Barseghyan (1:00.88); Ashot Chakhoyan (1:05.44); Varsenik Manucharyan (1:03.62); Ani Poghosyan (58.65)	4:08.59	NR
26	2	0	Uganda	Kirabo Namutebi (1:12.34); Tendo Mukalazi (1:07.69); Jesse Ssengonzi (53.76); Gloria Muzito (56.15)	4:09.94	NR
27	1	3	Kenya	Imara Thorpe (1:09.59); Maria Brunlehner (1:14.09); Ridhwan Mohamed (57.84); Monyo Maina (52.29)	4:13.81	
28	2	4	Dominican Republic	Anthony Pineiro (57.62); Javier Núñez (1:07.44); María Alejandra Fernández (1:06.43); Alejandra Santana (1:02.95)	4:14.44	
29	2	7	Bahrain	Amani Al-Obaidli (1:06.02); Saud Ghali (1:07.15); Ahmed Theibich (1:02.54); Noor Yusuf Abdulla (1:04.97)	4:20.68	NR
30	2	9	Micronesia	Katerson Moya (1:07.31); Tasi Limtiaco (1:04.60); Kestra Kihleng (1:11.67); Taeyanna Adams (1:05.67)	4:29.25	NR
31	1	4	Guam	James Hendrix (1:04.34); Israel Poppe (1:11.84); Amaya Bollinger (1:13.33); Mia Lee (1:01.23)	4:30.74	NR
32	1	5	Maldives	Hamna Ahmed (1:19.87); Mubal Azzam Ibrahim (1:14.47); Mohamed Rihan Shiham (1:01.39); Aishath Ulya Shaig (1:06.10)	4:41.83	
	2	1	Czech Republic		Did not start	
	3	5	Netherlands	Maaike de Waard (1:00.67); Caspar Corbeau (59.00); Nyls Korstanje (51.36); Kira Toussaint	Disqualified	

=== Final ===
The final was started at 20:48.

Rank	Lane	Nation	Swimmers	Time	Notes
1st place, gold medalist(s)	3	United States	Hunter Armstrong (53.07); Nic Fink (58.27); Claire Curzan (56.54); Kate Douglass (52.34)	3:40.22	
2nd place, silver medalist(s)	5	Australia	Bradley Woodward (53.92); Sam Williamson (59.54); Brianna Throssell (57.22); Shayna Jack (52.44)	3:43.12	
3rd place, bronze medalist(s)	4	Great Britain	Medi Harris (1:00.28); Adam Peaty (59.42); Matthew Richards (52.87); Anna Hopkin (52.52)	3:45.09	
4	2	Poland	Ksawery Masiuk (53.39); Dominika Sztandera (1:06.98); Jakub Majerski (51.05); Katarzyna Wasick (54.62)	3:46.04	
5	6	Greece	Apostolos Christou (53.50); Arkadios Aspougalis (1:01.22); Anna Ntountounaki (56.88); Theodora Drakou (55.09)	3:46.69	
6	8	Italy	Michele Lamberti (54.48); Nicolò Martinenghi (58.21); Giulia D'Innocenzo (1:00.22); Chiara Tarantino (54.38)	3:47.29	
7	1	Sweden	Hanna Rosvall (1:01.50); Erik Persson (1:00.16); Louise Hansson (57.39); Björn Seeliger (48.41)	3:47.46	
8	7	Japan	Osamu Kato (54.68); Ikuru Hiroshima (1:00.50); Chiharu Iitsuka (58.16); Nagisa Ikemoto (54.26)	3:47.60	
