= Spain at the 2024 World Aquatics Championships =

- Flag of Spain
- World Aquatics code: ESP
- National federation: Royal Spanish Swimming Federation
- Website: rfen.es (in Spanish)

in Doha, Qatar
- Competitors: 73 in 6 sports
- Medals Ranked 13th: Gold 1 Silver 5 Bronze 4 Total 10

World Aquatics Championships appearances
- 1973; 1975; 1978; 1982; 1986; 1991; 1994; 1998; 2001; 2003; 2005; 2007; 2009; 2011; 2013; 2015; 2017; 2019; 2022; 2023; 2024; 2025

Spain competed at the 2024 World Aquatics Championships in Doha, Qatar from 2 to 18 February.

== Medalists ==
| Medal | Name | Sport | Event | Date |
|---|---|---|---|---|
| 1st place, gold medalist(s) | Hugo González | Swimming | Men's 200 metre backstroke | 16 February 2024 |
| 2nd place, silver medalist(s) | María de Valdés | Open water swimming | Women's 10 km | 3 February 2024 |
| 2nd place, silver medalist(s) | Dennis González | Artistic swimming | Men's solo technical routine | 5 February 2024 |
| 2nd place, silver medalist(s) | Marina García Polo; Lilou Lluis Valette; Meritxell Mas; Alisa Ozhogina; Paula Ramírez; Sara Saldaña; Iris Tió; Blanca Toledano | Artistic swimming | Team technical routine | 6 February 2024 |
| 2nd place, silver medalist(s) | Dennis González; Mireia Hernández | Artistic swimming | Mixed duet free routine | 10 February 2024 |
| 2nd place, silver medalist(s) | Hugo González | Swimming | Men's 100 metre backstroke | 13 February 2024 |
| 3rd place, bronze medalist(s) | Adrián Abadía; Nicolás García | Diving | Men's synchronized 3 metre springboard | 4 February 2024 |
| 3rd place, bronze medalist(s) | Alisa Ozhogina; Iris Tió | Artistic swimming | Women's duet technical routine | 5 February 2024 |
| 3rd place, bronze medalist(s) | Spain women's national water polo team: Laura Ester Cristina Nogué Anni Espar Beatriz Ortiz Nona Pérez Paula Crespí Elena Ruiz Pili Peña; Judith Forca Paula Camus Maica García Godoy Paula Leitón Martina Terré Ariadna Ruiz Isabel Piralkova | Water polo | Women's tournament | 16 February 2024 |
| 3rd place, bronze medalist(s) | Spain men's national water polo team: Unai Aguirre Alberto Munárriz Álvaro Granados Bernat Sanahuja Miguel del Toro Marc Larumbe Martin Famera Sergi Cabanas; Roger Tahull Felipe Perrone Blai Mallarach Alejandro Bustos Eduardo Lorrio Unai Biel Fran Valera | Water polo | Men's tournament | 17 February 2024 |

== Competitors ==
The following is the list of competitors in the Championships.

| Sport | Men | Women | Total |
|---|---|---|---|
| Artistic swimming | 1 | 12 | 13 |
| Diving | 5 | 4 | 9 |
| High diving | 1 | 0 | 1 |
| Open water swimming | 1 | 3 | 4 |
| Swimming | 10 | 6 | 16 |
| Water polo | 15 | 15 | 30 |
| Total | 33 | 40 | 73 |

== Artistic swimming ==
Men

| Athlete | Event | Preliminaries | | Final | |
| Athlete | Event | Points | Rank | Points | Rank |
|---|---|---|---|---|---|
| Dennis González | Solo technical routine | 228.7550 | 3 Q | 227.6000 | 4 |
| Dennis González | Solo free routine | 191.3562 | 2 Q | 196.2750 | 2nd place, silver medalist(s) |

Women

| Athlete | Event | Preliminaries | | Final | |
| Athlete | Event | Points | Rank | Points | Rank |
|---|---|---|---|---|---|
| Alisa Ozhogina; Iris Tió | Duet technical routine | 258.7199 | 2 Q | 258.0333 | 3rd place, bronze medalist(s) |
| Alisa Ozhogina; Iris Tió | Duet free routine | 236.9958 | 4 Q | 243.9918 | 4 |

Mixed

| Athlete | Event | Preliminaries | | Final | |
| Athlete | Event | Points | Rank | Points | Rank |
|---|---|---|---|---|---|
| Dennis González; Mireia Hernández | Duet technical routine | 237.6200 | 3 Q | 214.4833 | 4 |
| Dennis González; Mireia Hernández | Duet free routine | 202.6041 | 2 Q | 208.3583 | 2nd place, silver medalist(s) |
| Marina García Polo; Lilou Lluis Valette; Meritxell Mas; Alisa Ozhogina; Paula Ramírez; Sara Saldaña; Iris Tió; Blanca Toledano | Team technical routine | 278.0675 | 3 Q | 275.8925 | 2nd place, silver medalist(s) |
| Cristina Arámbula; Berta Ferreras; Marina García Polo; Meritxell Mas; Alisa Ozhogina; Paula Ramírez; Sara Saldaña; Iris Tió | Team free routine | 308.2480 | 3 Q | 302.8228 | 4 |
| Cristina Arámbula; Berta Ferreras; Marina García Polo; Lilou Lluis Valette; Meritxell Mas; Alisa Ozhogina; Sara Saldaña; Iris Tió | Team acrobatic routine | 220.3767 | 5 Q | 219.9367 | 5 |

== Diving ==
Men

| Athlete | Event | Preliminaries | | Semifinals | | Final | |
| Athlete | Event | Points | Rank | Points | Rank | Points | Rank |
|---|---|---|---|---|---|---|---|
| Adrián Abadía | 3 m springboard | 348.20 | 25 | Did not advance | | | |
| Nicolás García | 3 m springboard | 342.75 | 28 | Did not advance | | | |
| Carlos Camacho | 10 m platform | 350.70 | 25 | Did not advance | | | |
| Jorge Rodríguez | 10 m platform | 353.35 | 23 | Did not advance | | | |
| Adrián Abadía; Nicolás García | 3 m synchro springboard | — | | | | 383.28 | 3rd place, bronze medalist(s) |
| Carlos Camacho; Max Liñán | 10 m synchro platform | — | | | | 332.88 | 13 |

Women

| Athlete | Event | Preliminaries | | Semifinals | | Final | |
| Athlete | Event | Points | Rank | Points | Rank | Points | Rank |
|---|---|---|---|---|---|---|---|
| María Papworth | 3 m springboard | 246.10 | 18 Q | 224.90 | 17 | Did not advance | |
| Rocío Velázquez | 3 m springboard | 193.35 | 46 | Did not advance | | | |
| Valeria Antolino | 10 m platform | 224.90 | 34 | Did not advance | | | |
| Valeria Antolino; Ana Carvajal | 10 m synchro platform | — | | | | 237.24 | 13 |

Mixed

| Athlete | Event | Final | |
| Athlete | Event | Points | Rank |
|---|---|---|---|
| Max Liñan; Ana Carvajal | 10 m synchro platform | 242.76 | 7 |
| Valeria Antolino; Nicolás García; Carlos Camacho; Rocío Velázquez | Team event | 310.55 | 8 |

== High diving ==
| Athlete | Event | Points | Rank |
|---|---|---|---|
| Carlos Gimeno | Men's high diving | 355.00 | 7 |

== Open water swimming ==
Men

| Athlete | Event | Time | Rank |
|---|---|---|---|
| Guillem Pujol | Men's 5 km | 53:22.2 | 21 |
| Guillem Pujol | Men's 10 km | 1:49:55.5 | 24 |

Women

| Athlete | Event | Time | Rank |
|---|---|---|---|
| María de Valdés | Women's 5 km | 57:39.5 | 6 |
| María de Valdés | Women's 10 km | 1:57:26.9 | 2nd place, silver medalist(s) |
| Ángela Martínez | Women's 10 km | 1:57:36.6 | 13 |
| Candela Sánchez | Women's 5 km | 58:03.4 | 37 |

== Swimming ==
Spain entered 21 swimmers.

Men

| Athlete | Event | Heat | | Semifinal | | Final | |
| Athlete | Event | Time | Rank | Time | Rank | Time | Rank |
|---|---|---|---|---|---|---|---|
| César Castro | 200 metre freestyle | 1:47.40 | 17 | Did not advance | | | |
| Carles Coll | 100 metre breaststroke | 1:01.50 | 27 | Did not advance | | | |
| Carles Coll | 200 metre breaststroke | 2:12.72 | 16 Q | 2:10.77 | 9 | Did not advance | |
| Carles Coll | 200 metre individual medley | Did not start | | Did not advance | | | |
| Sergio de Celis | 100 metre freestyle | 48.68 | 11 Q | 48.39 NR | 10 | Did not advance | |
| Carlos Garach Benito | 800 metre freestyle | 7:50.56 | 15 | — | | Did not advance | |
| Carlos Garach Benito | 1500 metre freestyle | 15:16.00 | 19 | — | | Did not advance | |
| Hugo González | 50 metre backstroke | 24.72 | 3 Q | 24.60 | 5 Q | 24.77 | 6 |
| Hugo González | 100 metre backstroke | 53.61 | 3 Q | 53.22 | 3 Q | 52.70 | 2nd place, silver medalist(s) |
| Hugo González | 200 metre backstroke | 1:59.00 | 14 Q | 1:56.38 | 2 Q | 1:55.30 | 1st place, gold medalist(s) |
| Hugo González | 200 metre individual medley | 2:02.10 | 20 | Did not advance | | | |
| Arbidel González | 200 metre butterfly | 1:57.20 | 11 Q | 1:56.77 | 10 | Did not advance | |
| Mario Molla | 50 metre butterfly | 23.37 | 10 Q | 23.17 | 3 Q | 23.29 | 6 |
| Mario Molla | 100 metre butterfly | 52.12 | 11 Q | 51.48 | 4 Q | 51.72 | 7 |
| Carlos Quijada | 400 metre freestyle | 3:52.86 | 29 | — | | Did not advance | |
| Adrian Santos | 50 metre backstroke | 25.15 | 14 Q | 25.09 | 13 | Did not advance | |
| Sergio de Celis; Luis Domínguez; Carles Coll; Mario Mollà; César Castro | 4 × 100 m freestyle relay | 3:14.71 | 7 Q | — | | 3:14.93 | 8 |
| César Castro; Luis Domínguez; Sergio de Celis; Mario Mollà; Carlos Quijada | 4 × 200 m freestyle relay | 7:10.63 NR | 7 Q | — | | 7:11.65 | 8 |
| Hugo González; Carles Coll; Mario Molla; Sergio de Celis | 4 × 100 m medley relay | 3:33.57 | 3 Q | — | | 3:33.20 | 5 |

Women

| Athlete | Event | Heat | | Semifinal | | Final | |
| Athlete | Event | Time | Rank | Time | Rank | Time | Rank |
|---|---|---|---|---|---|---|---|
| Maria Daza | 50 metre freestyle | 25.55 | 25 | Did not advance | | | |
| Maria Daza | 100 metre freestyle | 55.34 | 17 Q | 55.49 | 16 | Did not advance | |
| Maria Daza | 200 metre freestyle | 2:00.42 | 25 | Did not advance | | | |
| Paula Juste | 100 metre butterfly | 59.82 | 19 | Did not advance | | | |
| Paula Juste | 200 metre butterfly | 2:14.25 | 19 | Did not advance | | | |
| Nayara Pineda | 200 metre breaststroke | 2:27.45 | 12 Q | 2:29.74 | 16 | Did not advance | |
| Jimena Ruiz | 50 metre breaststroke | 31.99 | 25 | Did not advance | | | |
| Jimena Ruiz | 100 metre breaststroke | 1:08.74 | 21 | Did not advance | | | |
| Carmen Weiler | 50 metre backstroke | 28.68 | 19 | Did not advance | | | |
| Carmen Weiler | 100 metre backstroke | 1:00.44 | 7 Q | 1:00.81 | 9 | Did not advance | |
| África Zamorano | 200 metre backstroke | 2:12.55 | 12 Q | 2:11.44 | 11 | Did not advance | |
| Carmen Weiler; Jimena Ruiz; Paula Juste; María Daza | 4 × 100 m medley relay | 4:04.01 | 11 | — | | Did not advance | |

Mixed

| Athlete | Event | Heat | | Semifinal | | Final | |
| Athlete | Event | Time | Rank | Time | Rank | Time | Rank |
|---|---|---|---|---|---|---|---|
| Carmen Weiler; Carles Coll; Mario Mollá; María Daza | 4 × 100 m medley relay | 3:49.07 | 12 | — | | Did not advance | |

== Water polo ==
Summary

| Team | Event | Group stage | | | | Playoff | Quarterfinal | Semifinal | Final / BM | |
| Team | Event | Opposition Score | Opposition Score | Opposition Score | Rank | Opposition Score | Opposition Score | Opposition Score | Opposition Score | Rank |
|---|---|---|---|---|---|---|---|---|---|---|
| Spain | Men's tournament | South Africa; W 21–5 | Croatia; W 10–6 | Australia; W 15=9 | 1 QF | — | Montenegro; W 15–12 | Italy; L 6–8 | France; W 14–10 | 3rd place, bronze medalist(s) |
| Spain | Women's tournament | China; W 18–5 | Greece; W 16–8 | France; W 14–7 | 1 QF | — | Canada; W 12–9 | United States; L 9–11 | Greece; W 10-9 | 3rd place, bronze medalist(s) |

=== Men's tournament ===
Team roster

The following is the Spanish roster.

Head coach: David Martín

- 1 Unai Aguirre GK
- 2 Alberto Munárriz FP
- 3 Álvaro Granados FP
- 4 Bernat Sanahuja FP
- 5 Miguel del Toro FP
- 6 Marc Larumbe FP
- 7 Martin Famera FP
- 8 Sergi Cabanas FP
- 9 Roger Tahull FP
- 10 Felipe Perrone FP
- 11 Blai Mallarach FP
- 12 Alejandro Bustos FP
- 13 Eduardo Lorrio GK
- 14 Unai Biel FP
- 15 Fran Valera FP

Group play

| Pos | Team | Pld | W | PSW | PSL | L | GF | GA | GD | Pts | Qualification |
|---|---|---|---|---|---|---|---|---|---|---|---|
| 1 | Spain | 3 | 3 | 0 | 0 | 0 | 46 | 20 | +26 | 9 | Quarterfinals |
| 2 | Croatia | 3 | 2 | 0 | 0 | 1 | 48 | 24 | +24 | 6 | Playoffs |
| 3 | Australia | 3 | 1 | 0 | 0 | 2 | 46 | 35 | +11 | 3 | Playoffs |
| 4 | South Africa | 3 | 0 | 0 | 0 | 3 | 18 | 79 | −61 | 0 | 13–16th place semifinals |

Source: World Aquatics
Rules for classification: 1) points; 2) head-to-head points; 3) head-to-head goal difference; 4) head-to-head number of goals scored; 5) Goal difference.

| 5 February 2024; 09:00 | Report | South Africa | 5–21 | Spain | Aspire Dome, Doha; Referees: Viktor Salnichenko (KAZ), Cheng Beng Guan (SGP) |
| 5 February 2024; 09:00 | Report | Score by quarters: 1–6, 0–7, 0–4, 4–4 | | | Aspire Dome, Doha; Referees: Viktor Salnichenko (KAZ), Cheng Beng Guan (SGP) |
| 5 February 2024; 09:00 | Report | Van Zyl 3 | Goals | Biel, Granados 4 | Aspire Dome, Doha; Referees: Viktor Salnichenko (KAZ), Cheng Beng Guan (SGP) |

| 7 February 2024; 19:00 | Report | Spain | 10–6 | Croatia | Aspire Dome, Doha; Referees: Boris Margeta (SLO), Darren Spiritosanto (USA) |
| 7 February 2024; 19:00 | Report | Score by quarters: 2–1, 3–2, 1–0, 4–3 | | | Aspire Dome, Doha; Referees: Boris Margeta (SLO), Darren Spiritosanto (USA) |
| 7 February 2024; 19:00 | Report | Granados 3 | Goals | Fatović 3 | Aspire Dome, Doha; Referees: Boris Margeta (SLO), Darren Spiritosanto (USA) |

| 9 February 2024; 13:30 | Report | Australia | 9–15 | Spain | Aspire Dome, Doha; Referees: György Kun (HUN), Darren Spiritosanto (USA) |
| 9 February 2024; 13:30 | Report | Score by quarters: 2–4, 3–2, 2–4, 2–5 | | | Aspire Dome, Doha; Referees: György Kun (HUN), Darren Spiritosanto (USA) |
| 9 February 2024; 13:30 | Report | Mercep 3 | Goals | three players 3 | Aspire Dome, Doha; Referees: György Kun (HUN), Darren Spiritosanto (USA) |

Quarterfinals

| 13 February 2024; 16:00 | Report | Spain | 15–12 | Montenegro | Aspire Dome, Doha; Referees: Michiel Zwart (NED), Andrej Franulović (CRO) |
| 13 February 2024; 16:00 | Report | Score by quarters: 5–2, 3–5, 5–0, 2–5 | | | Aspire Dome, Doha; Referees: Michiel Zwart (NED), Andrej Franulović (CRO) |
| 13 February 2024; 16:00 | Report | Perrone 5 | Goals | Mršić 4 | Aspire Dome, Doha; Referees: Michiel Zwart (NED), Andrej Franulović (CRO) |

Semifinals

| 15 February 2024; 16:00 | Report | Spain | 6–8 | Italy | Aspire Dome, Doha; Referees: Boris Margeta (SLO), György Kun (HUN) |
| 15 February 2024; 16:00 | Report | Score by quarters: 1–1, 1–3, 1–2, 3–2 | | | Aspire Dome, Doha; Referees: Boris Margeta (SLO), György Kun (HUN) |
| 15 February 2024; 16:00 | Report | Larumbe, Munárriz 2 | Goals | three players 2 | Aspire Dome, Doha; Referees: Boris Margeta (SLO), György Kun (HUN) |

Third place game

| 17 February 2024; 11:30 | Report | Spain | 14–10 | France | Aspire Dome, Doha; Referees: György Kun (HUN), Darren Spiritosanto (USA) |
| 17 February 2024; 11:30 | Report | Score by quarters: 4–1, 5–3, 2–2, 3–4 | | | Aspire Dome, Doha; Referees: György Kun (HUN), Darren Spiritosanto (USA) |
| 17 February 2024; 11:30 | Report | Granados, Sanahuja 4 | Goals | three players 2 | Aspire Dome, Doha; Referees: György Kun (HUN), Darren Spiritosanto (USA) |

=== Women's tournament ===
Team roster

The following is the Spanish roster.

Head coach: Miki Oca

- 1 Laura Ester GK
- 2 Cristina Nogué FP
- 3 Anni Espar FP
- 4 Beatriz Ortiz FP
- 5 Nona Pérez FP
- 6 Paula Crespí FP
- 7 Elena Ruiz FP
- 8 Pili Peña FP
- 9 Judith Forca FP
- 10 Paula Camus FP
- 11 Maica García Godoy FP
- 12 Paula Leitón FP
- 13 Martina Terré GK
- 14 Ariadna Ruiz FP
- 15 Isabel Piralkova FP

Group play

| Pos | Team | Pld | W | PSW | PSL | L | GF | GA | GD | Pts | Qualification |
|---|---|---|---|---|---|---|---|---|---|---|---|
| 1 | Spain | 3 | 3 | 0 | 0 | 0 | 48 | 20 | +28 | 9 | Quarterfinals |
| 2 | Greece | 3 | 2 | 0 | 0 | 1 | 41 | 31 | +10 | 6 | Playoffs |
| 3 | China | 3 | 0 | 1 | 0 | 2 | 20 | 46 | −26 | 2 | Playoffs |
| 4 | France | 3 | 0 | 0 | 1 | 2 | 19 | 31 | −12 | 1 | 13–16th place semifinals |

Source: World Aquatics
Rules for classification: 1) points; 2) head-to-head points; 3) head-to-head goal difference; 4) head-to-head number of goals scored; 5) Goal difference.

| 4 February 2024; 10:30 | Report | China | 5–18 | Spain | Aspire Dome, Doha; Referees: Ashley Kaeshler (AUS), Andreia Stanojević (SRB) |
| 4 February 2024; 10:30 | Report | Score by quarters: 2–3, 2–5, 1–4, 0–6 | | | Aspire Dome, Doha; Referees: Ashley Kaeshler (AUS), Andreia Stanojević (SRB) |
| 4 February 2024; 10:30 | Report | Lu 2 | Goals | Crespí 4 | Aspire Dome, Doha; Referees: Ashley Kaeshler (AUS), Andreia Stanojević (SRB) |

| 6 February 2024; 19:00 | Report | Spain | 16–8 | Greece | Aspire Dome, Doha; Referees: Alessandro Severo (ITA), Ashleigh Kaeshler (AUS) |
| 6 February 2024; 19:00 | Report | Score by quarters: 2–2, 5–2, 4–2, 5–2 | | | Aspire Dome, Doha; Referees: Alessandro Severo (ITA), Ashleigh Kaeshler (AUS) |
| 6 February 2024; 19:00 | Report | Ortiz 4 | Goals | three players 2 | Aspire Dome, Doha; Referees: Alessandro Severo (ITA), Ashleigh Kaeshler (AUS) |

| 8 February 2024; 19:00 | Report | Spain | 14–7 | France | Aspire Dome, Doha; Referees: Hélène Painchaud (CAN), Darren Spiritosanto (USA) |
| 8 February 2024; 19:00 | Report | Score by quarters: 2–0, 5–4, 4–1, 3–2 | | | Aspire Dome, Doha; Referees: Hélène Painchaud (CAN), Darren Spiritosanto (USA) |
| 8 February 2024; 19:00 | Report | Nogué 3 | Goals | Bouloukbakchi, Vernoux 2 | Aspire Dome, Doha; Referees: Hélène Painchaud (CAN), Darren Spiritosanto (USA) |

Quarterfinals

| 12 February 2024; 17:30 | Report | Spain | 12–9 | Canada | Aspire Dome, Doha; Referees: Zhang Liang (CHN), Natalia Markopoulou (GRE) |
| 12 February 2024; 17:30 | Report | Score by quarters: 3–1, 4–1, 2–3, 3–4 | | | Aspire Dome, Doha; Referees: Zhang Liang (CHN), Natalia Markopoulou (GRE) |
| 12 February 2024; 17:30 | Report | Forca 5 | Goals | Crevier 3 | Aspire Dome, Doha; Referees: Zhang Liang (CHN), Natalia Markopoulou (GRE) |

Semifinals

| 14 February 2024; 16:00 | Report | United States | 11–9 | Spain | Aspire Dome, Doha; Referees: Michiel Zwart (NED), Alessandro Severo (ITA) |
| 14 February 2024; 16:00 | Report | Score by quarters: 3–1, 3–3, 4–3, 1–2 | | | Aspire Dome, Doha; Referees: Michiel Zwart (NED), Alessandro Severo (ITA) |
| 14 February 2024; 16:00 | Report | Flynn 3 | Goals | Piralkova, E. Ruiz 3 | Aspire Dome, Doha; Referees: Michiel Zwart (NED), Alessandro Severo (ITA) |

Third place game

| 16 February 2024; 11:30 | Report | Spain | 10–9 | Greece | Aspire Dome, Doha; Referees: Michiel Zwart (NED), Hélène Painchaud (CAN) |
| 16 February 2024; 11:30 | Report | Score by quarters: 2–1, 4–4, 1–1, 3–3 | | | Aspire Dome, Doha; Referees: Michiel Zwart (NED), Hélène Painchaud (CAN) |
| 16 February 2024; 11:30 | Report | Forca 3 | Goals | Ninou 3 | Aspire Dome, Doha; Referees: Michiel Zwart (NED), Hélène Painchaud (CAN) |
