= Great Britain at the 2024 World Aquatics Championships =

- Flag of Great Britain
- FINA code: GBR
- National federation: British Swimming
- Website: britishswimming.org

in Doha, Qatar
- Competitors: 52 in 6 sports
- Medals Ranked 5th: Gold 4 Silver 5 Bronze 9 Total 18

World Aquatics Championships appearances
- 1973; 1975; 1978; 1982; 1986; 1991; 1994; 1998; 2001; 2003; 2005; 2007; 2009; 2011; 2013; 2015; 2017; 2019; 2022; 2023; 2024

Great Britain competed at the 2024 World Aquatics Championships in Doha, Qatar from 2 to 18 February.

== Medalists ==
Medal	Name	Sport	Event	Date
1st place, gold medalist(s)	Tom Daley; Scarlett Mew Jensen; Daniel Goodfellow; Andrea Spendolini-Sirieix	Diving	Team event	2 February 2024
1st place, gold medalist(s)	Aidan Heslop	High diving	Men	15 February 2024
1st place, gold medalist(s)	Laura Stephens	Swimming	Women's 200 metre butterfly	15 February 2024
1st place, gold medalist(s)	Freya Colbert	Swimming	Women's 400 metre individual medley	18 February 2024
2nd place, silver medalist(s)	Grace Reid	Diving	Women's 1 metre springboard	2 February 2024
2nd place, silver medalist(s)	Kate Shortman; Isabelle Thorpe	Artistic swimming	Women's duet technical routine	5 February 2024
2nd place, silver medalist(s)	Tom Daley; Noah Williams	Diving	Men's synchronized 10 metre platform	8 February 2024
2nd place, silver medalist(s)	Freya Colbert; Abbie Wood; Lucy Hope; Medi Harris	Swimming	Women's 4 × 200 metre freestyle relay	15 February 2024
2nd place, silver medalist(s)	Max Litchfield	Swimming	Men's 400 metre individual medley	18 February 2024
3rd place, bronze medalist(s)	Ross Haslam	Diving	Men's 1 metre springboard	3 February 2024
3rd place, bronze medalist(s)	Hector Pardoe	Open water swimming	Men's 10 km	4 February 2024
3rd place, bronze medalist(s)	Andrea Spendolini-Sirieix	Diving	Women's 10 metre platform	5 February 2024
3rd place, bronze medalist(s)	Andrea Spendolini-Sirieix; Lois Toulson	Diving	Women's synchronized 10 metre platform	6 February 2024
3rd place, bronze medalist(s)	Yasmin Harper; Scarlett Mew Jensen	Diving	Women's synchronized 3 metre springboard	7 February 2024
3rd place, bronze medalist(s)	Kate Shortman; Isabelle Thorpe	Artistic swimming	Women's duet free routine	8 February 2024
3rd place, bronze medalist(s)	Adam Peaty	Swimming	Men's 100 metre breaststroke	12 February 2024
3rd place, bronze medalist(s)	Medi Harris; Adam Peaty; Matthew Richards; Anna Hopkin; James Wilby; Duncan Scott	Swimming	Mixed 4 × 100 metre medley relay	14 February 2024
3rd place, bronze medalist(s)	Ben Proud	Swimming	Men's 50 metre freestyle	17 February 2024

== Competitors ==
The following is the list of competitors in the Championships.

Sport	Men	Women	Total
Artistic swimming	0	2	2
Diving	7	5	12
High diving	1	0	1
Open water swimming	2	2	4
Swimming	12	8	20
Water polo	0	13	13
Total	22	30	52

== Artistic swimming ==
Women

Athlete	Event	Preliminaries		Final	
Athlete	Event	Points	Rank	Points	Rank
Kate Shortman; Isabelle Thorpe	Duet technical routine	253.6733	3 Q	259.560	2nd place, silver medalist(s)
Kate Shortman; Isabelle Thorpe	Duet free routine	237.1042	3 Q	247.2626	3rd place, bronze medalist(s)

== Diving ==
Men

Athlete	Event	Preliminaries		Semifinals		Final	
Athlete	Event	Points	Rank	Points	Rank	Points	Rank
Ross Haslam	1 m springboard	373.90	5 Q	—		393.10	3rd place, bronze medalist(s)
Ross Haslam	3 m springboard	429.05	4 Q	427.00	5 Q	438.60	6
Kyle Kothari	10 m platform	398.10	11 Q	409.00	11 Q	482.20	6
Jack Laugher	3 m springboard	363.10	20	Did not advance			
Noah Williams	10 m platform	451.95	3 Q	439.70	6 Q	479.05	7
Anthony Harding; Jack Laugher	3 m synchro springboard	—				376.26	5
Tom Daley; Noah Williams	10 m synchro platform	—				422.37	2nd place, silver medalist(s)

Women

Athlete	Event	Preliminaries		Semifinals		Final	
Athlete	Event	Points	Rank	Points	Rank	Points	Rank
Yasmin Harper	3 m springboard	238.80	23	Did not advance			
Grace Reid	1 m springboard	242.55	3 Q	—		257.25	2nd place, silver medalist(s)
Grace Reid	3 m springboard	282.55	6 Q	283.80	7 Q	284.00	8
Andrea Spendolini-Sirieix	10 m platform	344.00	3 Q	320.10	4 Q	377.10	3rd place, bronze medalist(s)
Lois Toulson	10 m platform	283.40	13 Q	273.90	11 Q	321.60	6
Yasmin Harper; Scarlett Mew Jensen	3 m synchro springboard	—				281.70	3rd place, bronze medalist(s)
Andrea Spendolini-Sirieix; Lois Toulson	10 m synchro platform	—				299.34	3rd place, bronze medalist(s)

Mixed

Athlete	Event	Final	
Athlete	Event	Points	Rank
Ross Haslam; Grace Reid	3 m synchro springboard	278.28	4
Tom Daley; Scarlett Mew Jensen; Daniel Goodfellow; Andrea Spendolini-Sirieix	Team event	421.65	1st place, gold medalist(s)

== High diving ==
Athlete	Event	Points	Rank
Aidan Heslop	Men's high diving	422.95	1st place, gold medalist(s)

== Open water swimming ==
Men

Athlete	Event	Time	Rank
Hector Pardoe	Men's 10 km	1:48:29.2	3rd place, bronze medalist(s)
Toby Robinson	Men's 10 km	1:48:54.7	15

Women

Athlete	Event	Time	Rank
Leah Crisp	Women's 10 km	1:57:50.0	17
Amber Keegan	Women's 10 km	1:59:00.4	28

== Swimming ==
Great Britain entered 20 swimmers.

Men

Athlete	Event	Heat		Semifinal		Final	
Athlete	Event	Time	Rank	Time	Rank	Time	Rank
Luke Greenbank	100 metre backstroke	54.93	23	Did not advance			
Luke Greenbank	200 metre backstroke	1:58.23	7 Q	1:57.29	9	Did not advance	
Max Litchfield	200 metre butterfly	1:57.48	14 Q	1:56.93	12	Did not advance	
Max Litchfield	400 metre individual medley	4:12.54	2 Q	—		4:10.40	2nd place, silver medalist(s)
Jack McMillan	200 metre freestyle	1:47.85	26	Did not advance			
Adam Peaty	50 metre breaststroke	27.23	12 Q	26.85	4 Q	26.77	4
Adam Peaty	100 metre breaststroke	59.34	3 Q	58.60	1 Q	59.10	3rd place, bronze medalist(s)
Ben Proud	50 metre freestyle	21.88	8 Q	21.54	3 Q	21.53	3rd place, bronze medalist(s)
Matt Richards	100 metre freestyle	48.05	4 Q	48.22	8 Q	47.82	4
Duncan Scott	200 metre freestyle	1:46.09	4 Q	1:46.24	8 Q	1:45.86	6
Duncan Scott	200 metre individual medley	1:59.91	8 Q	1:57.83	3 Q	1:57.75	6
Brodie Williams	200 metre backstroke	1:58.72	12 Q	1:58.23	12	Did not advance	
Matt Richards; Jacob Whittle; Tom Dean; Duncan Scott	4 × 100 m freestyle relay	3:13.96	3 Q	—		3:12.55	4
Matt Richards; Max Litchfield; Jack McMillan; Duncan Scott; Joe Litchfield	4 × 200 m freestyle relay	7:10.15	6 Q	—		7:05.09	4

Women

Athlete	Event	Heat		Semifinal		Final	
Athlete	Event	Time	Rank	Time	Rank	Time	Rank
Freya Colbert	200 metre backstroke	2:12.08	11 Q	2:10.67	8 Q	2:11.22	8
Freya Colbert	400 metre individual medley	4:42.33	3 Q	—		4:37.14	1st place, gold medalist(s)
Lauren Cox	50 metre backstroke	27.89	2 Q	27.55	2 Q	27.65	4
Lauren Cox	100 metre backstroke	1:00.27	5 Q	1:00.03	5 Q	59.60	5
Kathleen Dawson	50 metre backstroke	28.46	16 Q	28.22	12	Did not advance	
Kathleen Dawson	100 metre backstroke	1:00.36	6 Q	1:00.40	7 Q	1:00.42	6
Lucy Hope	200 metre freestyle	1:59.56	17	Did not advance			
Anna Hopkin	50 metre freestyle	24.70	5 Q	24.51	5 Q	24.51	6
Anna Hopkin	100 metre freestyle	54.49	7 Q	53.12	3 Q	53.09	5
Laura Stephens	200 metre butterfly	2:09.31	2 Q	2:07.97	3 Q	2:07.35	1st place, gold medalist(s)
Abbie Wood	200 metre individual medley	2:11.57	5 Q	2:11.35	7 Q	2:11.20	6
Freya Colbert; Abbie Wood; Lucy Hope; Medi Harris	4 × 200 m freestyle relay	7:58.18	6 Q	—		7:50.90	2nd place, silver medalist(s)

Mixed

Athlete	Event	Heat		Semifinal		Final	
Athlete	Event	Time	Rank	Time	Rank	Time	Rank
Medi Harris; Adam Peaty; Matthew Richards; Anna Hopkin; James Wilby; Duncan Scott	4 × 100 m medley relay	3:45.50	1 Q	—		3:45.09	3rd place, bronze medalist(s)

== Water polo ==
Summary

Team	Event	Group stage				Playoff	Quarterfinal	Semifinal	Final / BM	
Team	Event	Opposition Score	Opposition Score	Opposition Score	Rank	Opposition Score	Opposition Score	Opposition Score	Opposition Score	Rank
Great Britain	Women's tournament	Italy; L 10–22	Canada; L 5–20	South Africa; W 14–5	3 QP	Australia; L 8–20	—	China; L 10–15	Kazakhstan; W 8–6	11

=== Women's tournament ===
Team roster

The following is the Britain roster.

Head coach: Nick Buller

- 1 Sophie Jackson GK
- 2 Anya Clapperton FP
- 3 Amelia Peters FP
- 4 Cecily Turner FP
- 5 Toula Falvey FP
- 6 Katie Brown FP
- 7 Katy Cutler FP
- 8 Brooke Tafazolli FP
- 9 Katherine Rogers FP
- 10 Niamh Moloney FP
- 11 Lotte van Wingerden FP
- 12 Victoria Hawkins FP
- 13 Alexandria Robinson GK

Group play

Pos	Team	Pld	W	PSW	PSL	L	GF	GA	GD	Pts	Qualification
1	Italy	3	3	0	0	0	59	21	+38	9	Quarterfinals
2	Canada	3	2	0	0	1	52	19	+33	6	Playoffs
3	Great Britain	3	1	0	0	2	29	47	−18	3	Playoffs
4	South Africa	3	0	0	0	3	10	63	−53	0	13–16th place semifinals

Source: World Aquatics
Rules for classification: 1) points; 2) head-to-head points; 3) head-to-head goal difference; 4) head-to-head number of goals scored; 5) Goal difference.

4 February 2024; 16:30	Report	Great Britain	10–22	Italy	Aspire Dome, Doha; Referees: Jennifer McCall (USA), Cheng Beng Guan (SGP)
4 February 2024; 16:30	Report	Score by quarters: 3–5, 2–6, 2–6, 3–5			Aspire Dome, Doha; Referees: Jennifer McCall (USA), Cheng Beng Guan (SGP)
4 February 2024; 16:30	Report	Turner 3	Goals	Avegno, Bianconi 4	Aspire Dome, Doha; Referees: Jennifer McCall (USA), Cheng Beng Guan (SGP)

6 February 2024; 12:00	Report	Canada	20–5	Great Britain	Aspire Dome, Doha; Referees: Natalia Markopoulou (GRE), Jennifer McCall (USA)
6 February 2024; 12:00	Report	Score by quarters: 6–1, 5–2, 3–0, 6–2			Aspire Dome, Doha; Referees: Natalia Markopoulou (GRE), Jennifer McCall (USA)
6 February 2024; 12:00	Report	Lemay-Lavoie 4	Goals	Falvey 2	Aspire Dome, Doha; Referees: Natalia Markopoulou (GRE), Jennifer McCall (USA)

8 February 2024; 10:30	Report	South Africa	5–14	Great Britain	Aspire Dome, Doha; Referees: Viktor Salnichenko (KAZ), Asumi Tsuzaki (JPN)
8 February 2024; 10:30	Report	Score by quarters: 2–5, 0–4, 1–5, 2–0			Aspire Dome, Doha; Referees: Viktor Salnichenko (KAZ), Asumi Tsuzaki (JPN)
8 February 2024; 10:30	Report	Penney 2	Goals	Falvey 3	Aspire Dome, Doha; Referees: Viktor Salnichenko (KAZ), Asumi Tsuzaki (JPN)

Playoffs

10 February 2024; 17:30	Report	Australia	20–8	Great Britain	Aspire Dome, Doha; Referees: Natalia Markopoulou (GRE), Yuri Maciel (BRA)
10 February 2024; 17:30	Report	Score by quarters: 6–1, 6–2, 4–1, 4–4			Aspire Dome, Doha; Referees: Natalia Markopoulou (GRE), Yuri Maciel (BRA)
10 February 2024; 17:30	Report	A. Andrews 6	Goals	Cutler, Falvey 2	Aspire Dome, Doha; Referees: Natalia Markopoulou (GRE), Yuri Maciel (BRA)

9–12th place semifinals

12 February 2024; 12:00	Report	China	15–10	Great Britain	Aspire Dome, Doha; Referees: Asumi Tsuzaki (JPN), Nóra Debreceni (HUN)
12 February 2024; 12:00	Report	Score by quarters: 4–2, 5–3, 2–1, 4–4			Aspire Dome, Doha; Referees: Asumi Tsuzaki (JPN), Nóra Debreceni (HUN)
12 February 2024; 12:00	Report	three players 3	Goals	Turner 4	Aspire Dome, Doha; Referees: Asumi Tsuzaki (JPN), Nóra Debreceni (HUN)

Eleventh place game

14 February 2024; 09:00	Report	Great Britain	8–6	Kazakhstan	Aspire Dome, Doha; Referees: Cheng Beng Guan (SGP), Asumi Tsuzaki (JPN)
14 February 2024; 09:00	Report	Score by quarters: 3–1, 2–2, 0–3, 3–0			Aspire Dome, Doha; Referees: Cheng Beng Guan (SGP), Asumi Tsuzaki (JPN)
14 February 2024; 09:00	Report	Tafazolli 4	Goals	Novikova, Rakhmanova 2	Aspire Dome, Doha; Referees: Cheng Beng Guan (SGP), Asumi Tsuzaki (JPN)
