= Nikolaos Papanikolaou =

Nikolaos Papanikolaou may refer to:

- Nikos Papanikolaou (basketball), Greek basketball player
- Nikolaos Papanikolaou (athlete), Greek triple jumper
- Nikolaos Papanikolaou (water polo), Greek water polo player
