= Alysha Koloi =

Australian diver (born 2001)

Personal information
- Nationality: Australian
- Born: 8 September 2001 (age 24) Brisbane, Australia
- Height: 165 cm (5 ft 5 in)
- Weight: 65 kg (143 lb)

Sport
- Country: Australia
- Sport: Diving
Medal record
Women's diving
Representing Australia
World Championships
Gold medal – first place	2024 Doha	1 m springboard

Alysha Koloi (born 8 September 2001) is an Australian diver. She competed at the 2018 Summer Youth Olympics in the girl's 3m springboard event.

Koloi won the gold medal in the women's 1m springboard event at her first senior world championships, Doha 2024.

== Diving achievements ==
Competition	Event	2017	2018	2019	2020	2021	2022	2023	2024
International representing Australia (Senior)
FINA World Aquatics Championships	1m Springboard								1st place, gold medalist(s)
FINA World Aquatics Championships	3m Springboard								14th
FINA Diving World Cup	3m Springboard Synchro							7th	
FINA Diving World Cup (Super Final)	3m Springboard Synchro							5th	
International representing Australia (Junior)
Youth Olympic Games	3m Springboard		15th						
Domestic representing Queensland
Australian Open Championships	1m Springboard	6th	2nd place, silver medalist(s)	3rd place, bronze medalist(s)			4th		
Australian Open Championships	3m Springboard	8th	3rd place, bronze medalist(s)	4th		4th	6th	4th	
Australian Open Championships	3m Springboard Synchro	4th	2nd place, silver medalist(s)				3rd place, bronze medalist(s)	2nd place, silver medalist(s)	
