= Diving at the 2024 World Aquatics Championships =

- Host city: Doha, Qatar
- Date(s): 2–10 February
- Venue(s): Hamad Aquatic Centre
- Events: 13

Diving at the 2024 World Aquatics Championships was held from 2 to 10 February 2024 at the Hamad Aquatic Centre in Doha, Qatar.

== Schedule ==
13 events were held.

All times are local (UTC+3).

Date	Time	Event
2 February 2024	10:00	1m Springboard Women
2 February 2024	15:00	Mixed team event
2 February 2024	19:00	1m Springboard Women
3 February 2024	10:00	1m Springboard Men
3 February 2024	16:00	10m Platform synchro mixed
3 February 2024	19:00	1m Springboard Men
4 February 2024	10:00	10m Platform Women
4 February 2024	15:30	3m Springboard synchro Men
5 February 2024	10:00	10m Platform Women semifinal
5 February 2024	18:30	10m Platform Women
6 February 2024	10:00	3m Springboard Men
6 February 2024	18:30	10m Platform synchro Women
7 February 2024	10:00	3m Springboard Men semifinal
7 February 2024	13:00	3m Springboard synchro Women
7 February 2024	18:30	3m Springboard Men
8 February 2024	10:00	3m Springboard Women
8 February 2024	18:30	10m Platform synchro Men
9 February 2024	10:00	3m Springboard Women semifinal
9 February 2024	13:00	10m Platform Men
9 February 2024	18:30	3m Springboard Women
10 February 2024	10:00	10m Platform Men semifinal
10 February 2024	13:30	3m Springboard synchro mixed
10 February 2024	18:30	10m Platform Men

== Medal summary ==
=== Medal table ===
* Host nation (Qatar)

Rank	Nation	Gold	Silver	Bronze	Total
1	China	9	4	0	13
2	Australia	2	2	1	5
3	Great Britain	1	2	4	7
4	Mexico	1	1	2	4
5	Italy	0	2	0	2
5	North Korea	0	2	0	2
7	South Korea	0	0	2	2
7	Ukraine	0	0	2	2
9	Egypt	0	0	1	1
9	Spain	0	0	1	1
Totals (10 entries)		13	13	13	39

Source: World Aquatics

=== Men ===
Event	Gold		Silver		Bronze	
1 metre springboard	Osmar Olvera; Mexico	431.75	Li Shixin; Australia	395.70	Ross Haslam; Great Britain	393.10
3 metre springboard	Wang Zongyuan; China	538.70	Xie Siyi; China	516.10	Osmar Olvera; Mexico	498.40
10 metre platform	Yang Hao; China	564.05	Cao Yuan; China	553.20	Oleksiy Sereda; Ukraine	528.65
Synchronized; 3 metre springboard	China; Long Daoyi; Wang Zongyuan	442.41	Italy; Lorenzo Marsaglia; Giovanni Tocci	384.24	Spain; Adrián Abadía; Nicolás García	383.28
Synchronized; 10 metre platform	China; Lian Junjie; Yang Hao	470.76	Great Britain; Tom Daley; Noah Williams	422.57	Ukraine; Kirill Boliukh; Oleksiy Sereda	406.47

=== Women ===
Event	Gold		Silver		Bronze	
1 metre springboard	Alysha Koloi; Australia	260.50	Grace Reid; Great Britain	257.25	Maha Eissa; Egypt	257.15
3 metre springboard	Chang Yani; China	354.75	Chen Yiwen; China	336.60	Kim Su-ji; South Korea	311.25
10 metre platform	Quan Hongchan; China	436.25	Chen Yuxi; China	427.80	Andrea Spendolini-Sirieix; Great Britain	377.10
Synchronized; 3 metre springboard	China; Chang Yani; Chen Yiwen	323.43	Australia; Maddison Keeney; Anabelle Smith	300.45	Great Britain; Yasmin Harper; Scarlett Mew Jensen	281.70
Synchronized; 10 metre platform	China; Chen Yuxi; Quan Hongchan	362.22	North Korea; Jo Jin-mi; Kim Mi-rae	320.70	Great Britain; Andrea Spendolini-Sirieix; Lois Toulson	299.34

=== Mixed ===
Event	Gold		Silver		Bronze	
3 metre springboard	Australia; Domonic Bedggood; Maddison Keeney	300.93	Italy; Matteo Santoro; Chiara Pellacani	287.49	South Korea; Yi Jae-gyeong; Kim Su-ji	285.03
10 metre platform	China; Huang Jianjie; Zhang Jiaqi	353.82	North Korea; Im Yong-myong; Jo Jin-mi	303.96	Mexico; Kevin Berlín; Alejandra Estudillo	296.13
Team	Great Britain; Tom Daley; Scarlett Mew Jensen; Daniel Goodfellow; Andrea Spendolini-Sirieix	421.65	Mexico; Gabriela Agúndez; Randal Willars; Jahir Ocampo; Aranza Vázquez	412.80	Australia; Cassiel Rousseau; Maddison Keeney; Nikita Hains; Li Shixin	385.35
