= Turkmenistan at the 2025 World Aquatics Championships =

- Flag of Turkmenistan
- World Aquatics code: TKM
- National federation: National Federation of Aquatics of Turkmenistan

in Singapore
- Competitors: 4 in 1 sport
- Medals: Gold 0 Silver 0 Bronze 0 Total 0

World Aquatics Championships appearances
- 1994; 1998; 2001; 2003; 2005; 2007; 2009; 2011; 2013; 2015; 2017; 2019; 2022; 2023; 2024; 2025

Other related appearances
- Soviet Union (1973–1991)

Turkmenistan competed at the 2025 World Aquatics Championships in Singapore from July 11 to August 3, 2025.

== Competitors ==
The following is the list of competitors in the Championships.

Sport	Men	Women	Total
Swimming	2	2	4
Total	2	2	4

== Swimming ==
Turkmenistan entered 4 swimmers.

Men

Athlete	Event	Heat		Semi-final		Final	
Athlete	Event	Time	Rank	Time	Rank	Time	Rank
David Akopyan	50 m butterfly	25.66	69	Did not advance			
David Akopyan	200 m individual medley	2:16.21	45	Did not advance			
Musa Zhalayev	50 m freestyle	23.71	63	Did not advance			
Musa Zhalayev	100 m freestyle	52.29	66	Did not advance			

Women

Athlete	Event	Heat		Semi-final		Final	
Athlete	Event	Time	Rank	Time	Rank	Time	Rank
Anastasiya Morginshtern	50 m freestyle	28.15	65	Did not advance			
Anastasiya Morginshtern	100 m freestyle	1:02.62	66	Did not advance			
Aynura Primova	50 m backstroke	31.27	50	Did not advance			
Aynura Primova	100 m backstroke	1:08.05 NR	51	Did not advance			
