= Bulgaria at the 2025 World Aquatics Championships =

- Flag of Bulgaria
- World Aquatics code: BUL
- National federation: Bulgarian Swimming Federation
- Website: bul-swimming.org

in Singapore
- Competitors: 7 in 2 sports
- Medals: Gold 0 Silver 0 Bronze 0 Total 0

World Aquatics Championships appearances
- 1973; 1975; 1978; 1982; 1986; 1991; 1994; 1998; 2001; 2003; 2005; 2007; 2009; 2011; 2013; 2015; 2017; 2019; 2022; 2023; 2024; 2025

Bulgaria is competing at the 2025 World Aquatics Championships in Singapore from 11 July to 3 August 2025.

== Competitors ==
The following is the list of competitors in the Championships.

Sport	Men	Women	Total
Diving	1	0	1
Swimming	3	3	6
Total	4	3	7

== Diving ==
Men

Athlete	Event	Preliminary		Semifinal		Final	
Athlete	Event	Points	Rank	Points	Rank	Points	Rank
Tsvetomir Ereminov	1 m springboard	232.60	58	—		Did not advance	
Tsvetomir Ereminov	10 m platform	295.25	41	Did not advance			

== Swimming ==
Men

Athlete	Event	Heat		Semifinal		Final	
Athlete	Event	Time	Rank	Time	Rank	Time	Rank
Kaloyan Bratanov	50 m freestyle	22.48	41	Did not advance			
Kaloyan Bratanov	100 m freestyle	50.20	46	Did not advance			
Petar Petrov Mitsin	200 m freestyle	1:47.88	26	Did not advance			
Petar Petrov Mitsin	400 m freestyle	3:45.01	4 Q	—		3:45.28	7
Petar Petrov Mitsin	200 m butterfly	1:59.37	25	Did not advance			
Lyubomir Epitropov	100 m breaststroke	1:00.93	26	Did not advance			
Lyubomir Epitropov	200 m breaststroke	2:12.28	22	Did not advance			

Women

Athlete	Event	Heat		Semifinal		Final	
Athlete	Event	Time	Rank	Time	Rank	Time	Rank
Gabriela Georgieva	100 m backstroke	1:01.42	24	Did not advance			
Gabriela Georgieva	200 m backstroke	2:10.71	18	Did not advance			
Teya Nikolova	50 m breaststroke	30.67 NR	13 Q	30.88	15	Did not advance	
Teya Nikolova	100 m breaststroke	1:08.59	33	Did not advance			
Diana Petkova	50 m freestyle	Did not start		Did not advance			
Diana Petkova	200 m medley	2:16.03	28	Did not advance			
