= Iraq at the 2025 World Aquatics Championships =

- Flag of Iraq
- World Aquatics code: IRQ
- National federation: Iraq Aquatics

in Singapore
- Competitors: 2 in 1 sport
- Medals: Gold 0 Silver 0 Bronze 0 Total 0

World Aquatics Championships appearances
- 1998; 2001; 2003; 2005; 2007; 2009; 2011; 2013; 2015; 2017; 2019; 2022; 2023; 2024; 2025

Iraq is competing at the 2025 World Aquatics Championships in Singapore from 11 July to 3 August 2025.

== Competitors ==
The following is the list of competitors in the Championships.

Sport	Men	Women	Total
Swimming	2	0	2
Total	2	0	2

== Swimming ==
Men

Athlete	Event	Heat		Semifinal		Final	
Athlete	Event	Time	Rank	Time	Rank	Time	Rank
Ahmed Al-Mutairy	50 m freestyle	25.56	90	Did not advance			
Ahmed Al-Mutairy	100 m freestyle	54.37	83	Did not advance			
Mohammed Al-Khalidi	50 m breaststroke	30.16	66	Did not advance			
Mohammed Al-Khalidi	100 m breaststroke	1:05.87	60	Did not advance			
