= Bulgaria at the 2017 World Aquatics Championships =

- Flag of Bulgaria
- World Aquatics code: BUL
- National federation: Bulgarian Swimming
- Website: www.bul-swimming.org

in Budapest, Hungary
- Competitors: 8 in 4 sports
- Medals: Gold 0 Silver 0 Bronze 0 Total 0

World Aquatics Championships appearances
- 1973; 1975; 1978; 1982; 1986; 1991; 1994; 1998; 2001; 2003; 2005; 2007; 2009; 2011; 2013; 2015; 2017; 2019; 2022; 2023; 2024; 2025

Bulgaria competed at the 2017 World Aquatics Championships in Budapest, Hungary from 14 to 30 July.

== High diving ==
Bulgaria qualified one male high diver.

Athlete	Event	Points	Rank
Todor Spasov	Men's high diving	204.90	18

== Open water swimming ==
Bulgaria has entered one open water swimmer

Athlete	Event	Time	Rank
Ventsislav Aydarski	Men's 5 km	54:59.5	19
Ventsislav Aydarski	Men's 10 km	1:52:30.2	14

== Swimming ==
Bulgarian swimmers have achieved qualifying standards in the following events (up to a maximum of 2 swimmers in each event at the A-standard entry time, and 1 at the B-standard):

Athlete	Event	Heat		Semifinal		Final	
Athlete	Event	Time	Rank	Time	Rank	Time	Rank
Antani Ivanov	Men's 50 m butterfly	24.54	38	did not advance			
Antani Ivanov	Men's 100 m butterfly	53.66	=41	did not advance			
Antani Ivanov	Men's 200 m butterfly	1:55.55 NR	4 Q	1:55.58	8 Q	1:55.98	8
Aleksandar Nikolov	Men's 50 m freestyle	23.08	56	did not advance			
Aleksandar Nikolov	Men's 100 m freestyle	49.99	=46	did not advance			
Lachezar Shumkov	Men's 50 m breaststroke	28.07	=33	did not advance			
Lachezar Shumkov	Men's 100 m breaststroke	1:01.96	39	did not advance			
Gabriela Georgieva	Women's 50 m backstroke	29.29	38	did not advance			
Gabriela Georgieva	Women's 100 m backstroke	1:03.56	38	did not advance			
Gabriela Georgieva	Women's 200 m backstroke	2:18.69	28	did not advance			

== Synchronized swimming ==
Bulgaria's synchronized swimming team consisted of 2 athletes (2 female).

Women

Athlete	Event	Preliminaries		Final	
Athlete	Event	Points	Rank	Points	Rank
Hristina Damyanova	Solo technical routine	70.3736	25	did not advance	
Hristina Damyanova	Solo free routine	72.3667	26	did not advance	
Daniela Bozadzhieva; Hristina Damyanova	Duet technical routine	72.4098	32	did not advance	
Daniela Bozadzhieva; Hristina Damyanova	Duet free routine	72.0667	36	did not advance	
