= Swimming at the 2025 World Aquatics Championships – Women's 200 metre backstroke =

Women's 200 metre backstroke at the 2025 World Aquatics Championships
- Venue: World Aquatics Championships Arena
- Location: Singapore Sports Hub, Kallang
- Dates: 1 August (heats and semifinals); 2 August (final)
- Competitors: 42 from 32 nations
- Winning time: 2:03.33

Medalists
gold medal	Kaylee McKeown	Australia
silver medal	Regan Smith	United States
bronze medal	Claire Curzan	United States

The women's 200 metre backstroke event at the 2025 World Aquatics Championships was held from 1 to 2 August 2025 at the World Aquatics Championships Arena at the Singapore Sports Hub in Kallang, Singapore.

== Background ==
Australia's Kaylee McKeown, the two-time defending champion and world record holder (2:03.14), was the clear favorite to win the event. She held the world’s fastest time in 2025 (2:04.47) and had been under 2:04 six times.

Americans Regan Smith and Claire Curzan were the top challengers. Smith, the former world record holder (2:03.35), won silver at the last two major meets and had swum 2:05.84 in 2025. Curzan, the 2024 World champion in McKeown’s absence, swam a lifetime best of 2:05.09 at the United States Nationals, ranking her second in 2025.

Other medal threats included China’s Peng Xuwei (2:06.54 this season, 2023 Worlds bronze) and Britain’s Katie Shanahan (2:07.45). China’s Liu Yaxin (2:06.71) and Spain’s Estella Tonrath (2:08.03) led a tight group aiming for final spots.

== Qualification ==
Each National Federation was permitted to enter a maximum of two qualified athletes in each individual event, but they could do so only if both of them had attained the "A" standard qualification time. For this event, the "A" standard qualification time was 2:11.08. Federations could enter one athlete into the event if they met the "B" standard qualification time. For this event, the "B" standard qualification time was 2:15.67. Athletes could also enter the event if they had met an "A" or "B" standard in a different event and their Federation had not entered anyone else. Additional considerations applied to Federations who had few swimmers enter through the standard qualification times. Federations in this category could at least enter two men and two women to the competition, all of whom could enter into up to two events.

Top 10 fastest qualification times (Note: Only including swimmers who were on the start list for this event)
Swimmer	Country	Time	Competition
Kaylee McKeown	Australia	2:03.30	2024 Australian Trials
Regan Smith	United States	2:03.99	2024 TYR Pro Swim Series (Westmont)
Claire Curzan	United States	2:05.09	2025 United States Championships
Katie Shanahan	Great Britain	2:07.53	2024 Summer Olympics
Peng Xuwei	China	2:07.57	2024 Chinese Championships
Estella Tonrath	Spain	2:08.03	2025 Spanish Championships
Holly McGill	Great Britain	2:08.20	2025 Aquatics GB Championships
Hannah Fredericks	Australia	2:08.25	2024 Australian Trials
Pauline Mahieu	France	2:08.28	2025 French Elite Chammpionships
Liu Yaxin	China	2:08.41	2024 Chinese Championships

== Records ==
Prior to the competition, the existing world and championship records were as follows.

World record	Kaylee McKeown (AUS)	2:03.14	Sydney, Australia	10 March 2023
Competition record	Regan Smith (USA)	2:03.35	Gwangju, South Korea	26 July 2019

The following new records were set during this competition.

Date	Event	Name	Nationality	Time	Record
2 August	Final	Kaylee McKeown	Australia	2:03.33	CR

== Heats ==
The hats took place on 1 August 2025 at 10:27.

Rank	Heat	Lane	Swimmer	Nation	Time	Notes
1	5	4	Kaylee McKeown	Australia	2:08.01	Q
2	5	7	Dóra Molnár	Hungary	2:08.53	Q
3	3	4	Claire Curzan	United States	2:08.58	Q
4	4	5	Peng Xuwei	China	2:08.59	Q
5	4	4	Regan Smith	United States	2:08.65	Q
6	5	2	Anastasiya Shkurdai	Neutral Athletes A	2:08.96	Q
7	3	5	Estella Tonrath	Spain	2:09.29	Q
8	5	6	Liu Yaxin	China	2:09.67	Q
9	4	2	Camila Rebelo	Portugal	2:09.79	Q
10	5	5	Katie Shanahan	Great Britain	2:09.96	WD
11	4	0	Lise Seidel	Germany	2:10.00	Q
12	5	3	Holly McGill	Great Britain	2:10.07	Q
13	3	6	Carmen Weiler	Spain	2:10.08	Q
14	5	0	Ingrid Wilm	Canada	2:10.11	Q
15	4	3	Hannah Fredericks	Australia	2:10.23	Q
16	5	8	Daria Zarubenkova	Neutral Athletes B	2:10.35	Q
17	4	8	Milana Stepanova	Neutral Athletes B	2:10.60	Q
18	4	9	Gabriela Georgieva	Bulgaria	2:10.71	
19	5	1	Madison Kryger	Canada	2:11.40	
20	4	1	Mio Narita	Japan	2:11.58	
21	3	1	Aleksandra Knop	Poland	2:11.63	
22	4	7	Aviv Barzelay	Israel	2:11.85	
23	3	2	Eszter Szabó-Feltóthy	Hungary	2:12.08	
24	3	3	Pauline Mahieu	France	2:12.33	
25	3	8	Chiaki Yamamoto	Japan	2:12.63	
26	5	9	Miranda Grana	Mexico	2:12.70	
27	3	7	Laura Bernat	Poland	2:12.86	
28	2	4	Xeniya Ignatova	Kazakhstan	2:14.09	
29	3	9	Justine Murdock	Lithuania	2:14.14	
30	2	2	Alexia Sotomayor	Peru	2:14.56	
31	3	0	Cindy Cheung	Hong Kong	2:14.73	
32	2	6	Chang Ya-jia	Chinese Taipei	2:17.34	
33	2	1	Mia Millar	Thailand	2:18.50	
34	2	8	Anishta Teeluck	Mauritius	2:18.88	
35	2	3	Zuri Ferguson	Trinidad and Tobago	2:18.89	
36	2	0	Elizabeth Jiménez	Dominican Republic	2:19.03	
37	2	5	Natalia Zaiteva	Moldova	2:19.38	
38	2	9	Taline Mourad	Lebanon	2:22.74	
39	1	4	Carolina Cermelli	Panama	2:23.30	
40	1	5	Minagi Rupesinghe	Sri Lanka	2:23.70	
41	1	3	Marseleima Moss	Fiji	2:30.72	
42	1	6	Piper Raho	Northern Mariana Islands	2:38.43	
	2	7	Kristen Romano	Puerto Rico	Did not start	
	4	6	Anastasia Gorbenko	Israel	Did not start	

== Semifinals ==
The semifinals took place on 1 August at 19:21.

Rank	Heat	Lane	Swimmer	Nation	Time	Notes
1	1	5	Peng Xuwei	China	2:07.76	Q
2	1	3	Anastasiya Shkurdai	Neutral Athletes A	2:07.85	Q
3	2	5	Claire Curzan	United States	2:08.13	Q
4	2	4	Kaylee McKeown	Australia	2:08.36	Q
5	2	3	Regan Smith	United States	2:08.67	Q
6	2	7	Lise Seidel	Germany	2:08.75	Q
7	1	6	Liu Yaxin	China	2:09.04	Q
8	1	4	Dóra Molnár	Hungary	2:09.09	Q
9	2	2	Camila Rebelo	Portugal	2:09.40	
10	1	7	Holly McGill	Great Britain	2:09.51	
11	1	2	Milana Stepanova	Neutral Athletes B	2:09.57	
12	2	6	Estella Tonrath	Spain	2:09.84	
13	1	1	Ingrid Wilm	Canada	2:10.28	
14	2	1	Carmen Weiler	Spain	2:10.40	
15	2	8	Hannah Fredericks	Australia	2:10.83	
16	1	8	Daria Zarubenkova	Neutral Athletes B	2:10.92	

== Final ==
The final took place on 2 August at 19:17.

Rank	Lane	Name	Nationality	Time	Notes
1st place, gold medalist(s)	6	Kaylee McKeown	Australia	2:03.33	CR
2nd place, silver medalist(s)	2	Regan Smith	United States	2:04.29	
3rd place, bronze medalist(s)	3	Claire Curzan	United States	2:06.04	
4	4	Peng Xuwei	China	2:07.22	
5	5	Anastasiya Shkurdai	Neutral Athletes A	2:08.09	
6	1	Liu Yaxin	China	2:09.71	
7	8	Dóra Molnár	Hungary	2:09.74	
8	7	Lise Seidel	Germany	2:10.01	
