= Saint Kitts and Nevis at the 2025 World Aquatics Championships =

- Flag of Saint Kitts and Nevis
- World Aquatics code: SKN
- National federation: St. Kitts and Nevis Swimming Federation

in Singapore
- Competitors: 1 in 1 sport
- Medals: Gold 0 Silver 0 Bronze 0 Total 0

World Aquatics Championships appearances
- 2019; 2022; 2023; 2024; 2025

Saint Kitts and Nevis will compete at the 2025 World Aquatics Championships in Singapore from July 11 to August 3, 2025.

== Swimming ==
Swimmer from Saint Kitts and Nevis has achieved qualifying standards in the following events. 13 year old Skyla Connor represented the country.

Women
Athlete	Event	Heat		Semifinal		Final	
Athlete	Event	Time	Rank	Time	Rank	Time	Rank
Skyla Connor	50 m freestyle	30.47	88	Did not advance			
Skyla Connor	50 m breaststroke	42.19	52	Did not advance			
