= Bulgaria at the 2015 World Aquatics Championships =

- Flag of Bulgaria
- FINA code: BUL
- National federation: Bulgarian Swimming
- Website: www.bul-swimming.org

in Kazan, Russia
- Competitors: 9 in 4 sports
- Medals: Gold 0 Silver 0 Bronze 0 Total 0

World Aquatics Championships appearances
- 1973; 1975; 1978; 1982; 1986; 1991; 1994; 1998; 2001; 2003; 2005; 2007; 2009; 2011; 2013; 2015; 2017; 2019; 2022; 2023; 2024

Bulgaria competed at the 2015 World Aquatics Championships in Kazan, Russia from July 21 to August 9, 2015.

== High diving ==
Bulgaria has qualified one high diver at the World Championships.

Athlete	Event	Points	Rank
Todor Spasov	Men's high diving	517.50	11

== Open water swimming ==
Bulgaria has qualified one swimmer to compete in the open water marathon.

Athlete	Event	Time	Rank
Ventsislav Aydarski	Men's 10 km	1:53:58.6	46

== Swimming ==
Bulgarian swimmers have achieved qualifying standards in the following events (up to a maximum of 2 swimmers in each event at the A-standard entry time, and 1 at the B-standard):

Men

Athlete	Event	Heat		Semifinal		Final	
Athlete	Event	Time	Rank	Time	Rank	Time	Rank
Nikola Dimitrov	400 m individual medley	4:30.78	39	—		did not advance	
Aleksandar Nikolov	100 m freestyle	51.01	56	did not advance			
Lachezar Shumkov	50 m breaststroke	28.36	35	did not advance			
Lachezar Shumkov	100 m breaststroke	1:03.08	47	did not advance			
Martin Zhelev	50 m backstroke	26.66	46	did not advance			
Martin Zhelev	100 m backstroke	57.55	48	did not advance			

Women

Athlete	Event	Heat		Semifinal		Final	
Athlete	Event	Time	Rank	Time	Rank	Time	Rank
Nina Rangelova	50 m freestyle	25.94	=39	did not advance			
Nina Rangelova	100 m freestyle	55.22	23	did not advance			
Nina Rangelova	200 m freestyle	1:58.41	15 Q	1:59.54	16	did not advance	

== Synchronized swimming ==
Bulgaria has qualified three synchronized swimmers to compete in each of the following events.

Athlete	Event	Preliminaries		Final						
Athlete	Event	Points	Rank	Points	Rank					
Hristina Damyanova	Solo technical routine	72.8160	20	did not advance						
Daniela Bozadzhieva	Solo free routine	72.3000	24	did not advance						
Hristina Damyanova; Daniela Bozadzhieva	Duet technical routine	71.1065	31	did not advance		Zlatina Dimitrova; Hristina Damyanova	Duet free routine	71.8667	32	did not advance
