= Bulgaria at the 2022 World Aquatics Championships =

- Flag of Bulgaria
- World Aquatics code: BUL
- National federation: Bulgarian Swimming
- Website: www.bul-swimming.org

in Budapest, Hungary
- Medals: Gold 0 Silver 0 Bronze 0 Total 0

World Aquatics Championships appearances
- 1973; 1975; 1978; 1982; 1986; 1991; 1994; 1998; 2001; 2003; 2005; 2007; 2009; 2011; 2013; 2015; 2017; 2019; 2022; 2023; 2024; 2025

Bulgaria competed at the 2022 World Aquatics Championships in Budapest, Hungary from 17 June to 3 July.

== Swimming ==
Bulgaria entered eight swimmers.

Men

Athlete	Event	Heat		Semifinal		Final	
Athlete	Event	Time	Rank	Time	Rank	Time	Rank
Kaloyan Bratanov	50 m freestyle	22.68	=38	did not advance			
Kaloyan Bratanov	200 m medley	2:01.22	21	did not advance			
Lyubomir Epitropov	50 m breaststroke	DSQ		did not advance			
Lyubomir Epitropov	100 m breaststroke	1:01.06	21	did not advance			
Lyubomir Epitropov	200 m breaststroke	2:11.52	14 Q	2:11.01	14	did not advance	
Antani Ivanov	50 m butterfly	Withdrawn		did not advance			
Antani Ivanov	100 m butterfly	53.36	35	did not advance			
Antani Ivanov	200 m butterfly	1:57.00	18	did not advance			
Deniel Nankov	100 m freestyle	50.30	46	did not advance			
Yordan Yanchev	200 m freestyle	1:52.62	45	did not advance			
Yordan Yanchev	400 m freestyle	3:56.52	29	—N/a		did not advance	

Women

Athlete	Event	Heat		Semifinal		Final	
Athlete	Event	Time	Rank	Time	Rank	Time	Rank
Zhanet Angelova	200 m freestyle	2:05.88	29	did not advance			
Zhanet Angelova	400 m freestyle	4:20.55	25	—N/a		did not advance	
Zhanet Angelova	800 m freestyle	Withdrawn		—N/a		did not advance	
Gabriela Georgieva	100 m backstroke	1:02.86	24	did not advance			
Gabriela Georgieva	200 m backstroke	2:12.69	12 Q	2:13.15	13	did not advance	
Diana Petkova	50 m freestyle	25.97	=24	did not advance			
Diana Petkova	100 m freestyle	DNS		did not advance			
Diana Petkova	50 m breaststroke	32.32	33	did not advance			
Diana Petkova	100 m breaststroke	1:10.81	34	did not advance			
Diana Petkova	200 m medley	2:19.40	30	did not advance			
