= Bulgaria at the 2013 World Aquatics Championships =

- Flag of Bulgaria
- World Aquatics code: BUL
- National federation: Bulgarian Swimming
- Website: www.bul-swimming.org

in Barcelona, Spain
- Competitors: 6 in 3 sports
- Medals: Gold 0 Silver 0 Bronze 0 Total 0

World Aquatics Championships appearances
- 1973; 1975; 1978; 1982; 1986; 1991; 1994; 1998; 2001; 2003; 2005; 2007; 2009; 2011; 2013; 2015; 2017; 2019; 2022; 2023; 2024; 2025

Bulgaria competed at the 2013 World Aquatics Championships in Barcelona, Spain between 19 July and 4 August 2013.

== Open water swimming ==
Bulgaria qualified a single quota in open water swimming.

Athlete	Event	Time	Rank
Ventsislav Aydarski	Men's 5 km	53:45.6	20
Ventsislav Aydarski	Men's 10 km	1:50:00.2	25

== Swimming ==
Bulgarian swimmers achieved qualifying standards in the following events (up to a maximum of 2 swimmers in each event at the A-standard entry time, and 1 at the B-standard):

Men

Athlete	Event	Heat		Final	
Athlete	Event	Time	Rank	Time	Rank
Nikola Dimitrov	400 m individual medley	4:28.73	31	Did not advance	

Women

Athlete	Event	Heat		Semifinal		Final	
Athlete	Event	Time	Rank	Time	Rank	Time	Rank
Ekaterina Avramova	50 m backstroke	29.75	35	Did not advance			
Ekaterina Avramova	100 m backstroke	1:02.79	29	Did not advance			
Ekaterina Avramova	200 m backstroke	DNS		Did not advance			
Vangelina Draganova	50 m breaststroke	33.10	47	Did not advance			
Nina Rangelova	100 m freestyle	55.95	31	Did not advance			
Nina Rangelova	200 m freestyle	2:00.41	24	Did not advance			
Nina Rangelova	400 m freestyle	4:18.94	24	—N/a		Did not advance	

== Synchronized swimming ==
Bulgaria had qualified two synchronized swimmers.

Athlete	Event	Preliminaries		Final	
Athlete	Event	Points	Rank	Points	Rank
Kalina Yordanova	Solo free routine	76.490	23	Did not advance	
Kalina Yordanova	Solo technical routine	74.900	24	Did not advance	
Maria Kirkova; Kalina Yordanova	Duet free routine	71.430	27	Did not advance	
Maria Kirkova; Kalina Yordanova	Duet technical routine	68.500	28	Did not advance	
