= Bulgaria at the 2023 World Aquatics Championships =

- Flag of Bulgaria
- FINA code: BUL
- National federation: Bulgarian Swimming Federation
- Website: bul-swimming.org

in Fukuoka, Japan
- Competitors: 6 in 2 sports
- Medals: Gold 0 Silver 0 Bronze 0 Total 0

World Aquatics Championships appearances
- 1973; 1975; 1978; 1982; 1986; 1991; 1994; 1998; 2001; 2003; 2005; 2007; 2009; 2011; 2013; 2015; 2017; 2019; 2022; 2023; 2024

Bulgaria is set to compete at the 2023 World Aquatics Championships in Fukuoka, Japan from 14 to 30 July.

== Artistic swimming ==
Bulgaria entered 3 artistic swimmers.

Women

Athlete	Event	Preliminaries		Final	
Athlete	Event	Points	Rank	Points	Rank
Aleksandra Atanasova	Solo technical routine	168.2733	18	did not advance	
Aleksandra Atanasova	Solo free routine	132.9146	18	did not advance	
Sasha Miteva; Dalia Penkova	Duet technical routine	168.6933	29	did not advance	
Sasha Miteva; Dalia Penkova	Duet free routine	132.2832	26	did not advance	

== Swimming ==
Bulgaria entered 3 swimmers.

Men

Athlete	Event	Heat		Semifinal		Final	
Athlete	Event	Time	Rank	Time	Rank	Time	Rank
Lyubomir Epitropov	100 metre breaststroke	1:01.16	27	Did not advance			
Lyubomir Epitropov	200 metre breaststroke	2:10.76	13 Q	2:11.28	15	Did not advance	
Josif Miladinov	50 metre butterfly	23.36	15 Q	23.40	16	Did not advance	
Josif Miladinov	100 metre butterfly	51.47	8 Q	51.81	14	Did not advance	

Women

Athlete	Event	Heat		Semifinal		Final	
Athlete	Event	Time	Rank	Time	Rank	Time	Rank
Gabriela Georgieva	100 metre backstroke	1:01.66	28	Did not advance			
Gabriela Georgieva	200 metre backstroke	2:11.22	12 Q	2:11.99	13	Did not advance	
