= Curaçao at the 2025 World Aquatics Championships =

- Flag of Curaçao
- World Aquatics code: CUR
- National federation: Curaçao Aquatics Federation

in Singapore
- Competitors: 4 in 2 sports
- Medals: Gold 0 Silver 0 Bronze 0 Total 0

World Aquatics Championships appearances
- 2015; 2017; 2019; 2022; 2023; 2024; 2025

Curaçao is competing at the 2025 World Aquatics Championships in Singapore from 11 July to 3 August 2025.

== Competitors ==
The following is the list of competitors in the Championships.

Sport	Men	Women	Total
Artistic swimming	1	1	2
Swimming	1	1	2
Total	2	2	4

== Artistic swimming ==
Mixed

Athlete	Event	Final	
Athlete	Event	Points	Rank
Yaqil Alberto; Kyra Van Den Berg	Duet technical	108.2151	14

== Swimming ==
Men

Athlete	Event	Heat		Semifinal		Final	
Athlete	Event	Time	Rank	Time	Rank	Time	Rank
Jayden Loran	50 m breaststroke	29.78	64	Did not advance			
Jayden Loran	100 m breaststroke	1:06.10	61	Did not advance			

Women

Athlete	Event	Heat		Semifinal		Final	
Athlete	Event	Time	Rank	Time	Rank	Time	Rank
Kyra De Cuba	50 m freestyle	28.30	68	Did not advance			
Kyra De Cuba	50 m butterfly	29.36	59	Did not advance			
