= Bulgaria at the 2019 World Aquatics Championships =

- Flag of Bulgaria
- FINA code: BUL
- National federation: Bulgarian Swimming
- Website: www.bul-swimming.org

World Aquatics Championships appearances
- 1973; 1975; 1978; 1982; 1986; 1991; 1994; 1998; 2001; 2003; 2005; 2007; 2009; 2011; 2013; 2015; 2017; 2019; 2022; 2023; 2024

Bulgaria competed at the 2019 World Aquatics Championships in Gwangju, South Korea from 12 to 28 July.

== Artistic swimming ==
Bulgaria's artistic swimming team consisted of 2 athletes (2 female).

Women

Athlete	Event	Preliminaries		Final	
Athlete	Event	Points	Rank	Points	Rank
Aleksandra Atanasova	Solo technical routine	75.4207	18	Did not advance	
Aleksandra Atanasova	Solo free routine	76.1333	22	Did not advance	
Aleksandra Atanasova; Dalia Penkova	Duet technical routine	72.3751	38	Did not advance	
Aleksandra Atanasova; Dalia Penkova	Duet free routine	74.1667	36	Did not advance	

== Swimming ==
Bulgaria entered six swimmers.

Men

Athlete	Event	Heat		Semifinal		Final	
Athlete	Event	Time	Rank	Time	Rank	Time	Rank
Lyubomir Epitropov	100 m breaststroke	1:02.04	40	Did not advance			
Lyubomir Epitropov	200 m breaststroke	2:11.78	25	Did not advance			
Antani Ivanov	50 m butterfly	24.28	40	Did not advance			
Antani Ivanov	100 m butterfly	DNS		Did not advance			
Antani Ivanov	200 m butterfly	1:56.35	=6 Q	1:56.25; SO: 1:59.52	9	Did not advance	
Svetlozar Nikolov	400 m individual medley	4:26.88	27	—		Did not advance	
Svetlozar Nikolov	200 m individual medley	2:04.99	37	Did not advance			
Lachezar Shumkov	50 m breaststroke	28.00	35	Did not advance			

Women

Athlete	Event	Heat		Semifinal		Final	
Athlete	Event	Time	Rank	Time	Rank	Time	Rank
Gabriela Georgieva	100 m backstroke	1:01.81	33	Did not advance			
Gabriela Georgieva	200 m backstroke	2:11.16	17	Did not advance			
