= Bulgaria at the 2024 World Aquatics Championships =

- Flag of Bulgaria
- FINA code: BUL
- National federation: Bulgarian Swimming Federation
- Website: bul-swimming.org

in Doha, Qatar
- Competitors: 10 in 2 sports
- Medals: Gold 0 Silver 0 Bronze 0 Total 0

World Aquatics Championships appearances
- 1973; 1975; 1978; 1982; 1986; 1991; 1994; 1998; 2001; 2003; 2005; 2007; 2009; 2011; 2013; 2015; 2017; 2019; 2022; 2023; 2024

Bulgaria competed at the 2024 World Aquatics Championships in Doha, Qatar from 2 to 18 February.

== Competitors ==
The following is the list of competitors in the Championships.

Sport	Men	Women	Total
Artistic swimming	1	1	2
Swimming	7	1	8
Total	8	2	10

== Artistic swimming ==
Men

Athlete	Event	Preliminaries		Final	
Athlete	Event	Points	Rank	Points	Rank
Dimitar Isaev	Solo technical routine	121.4600	14	Did not advance	

Mixed

Athlete	Event	Preliminaries		Final	
Athlete	Event	Points	Rank	Points	Rank
Hristina Cherkezova; Dimitar Isaev	Duet technical routine	151.0600	12 Q	155.3433	12
Hristina Cherkezova; Dimitar Isaev	Duet free routine	108.2458	9 Q	93.7938	10

== Swimming ==
Bulgaria entered 8 swimmers.

Men

Athlete	Event	Heat		Semifinal		Final	
Athlete	Event	Time	Rank	Time	Rank	Time	Rank
Kaloyan Bratanov	50 metre freestyle	22.48	33	Did not advance			
Kaloyan Bratanov	100 metre freestyle	49.67	34	Did not advance			
Lyubomir Epitropov	200 metre breaststroke	2:10.57	2 Q	2:10.89	11	Did not advance	
Kaloyan Levterov	50 metre backstroke	26.25	29	Did not advance			
Kaloyan Levterov	100 metre backstroke	55.44	26	Did not advance			
Kaloyan Levterov	200 metre backstroke	1:59.42	18	Did not advance			
Josif Miladinov	50 metre butterfly	23.63	21	Did not advance			
Josif Miladinov	100 metre butterfly	52.10	10 Q	51.72	6 Q	51.73	8
Petar Mitsin	400 metre freestyle	3:49.43	23	—		Did not advance	
Petar Mitsin	200 metre butterfly	1:57.52; 1:56.91	16 S/off; 1 Q	1:57.77	14	Did not advance	
Tonislav Sabev	50 metre breaststroke	28.13	23	Did not advance			
Tonislav Sabev	100 metre breaststroke	1:01.95	31	Did not advance			
Yordan Yanchev	200 metre freestyle	1:52.43	41	Did not advance			
Josif Miladinov; Kaloyan Bratanov; Petar Mitsin; Yordan Yanchev	4 × 100 metre freestyle relay	3:20.53 NR	16	—		Did not advance	
Petar Mitsin; Kaloyan Bratanov; Kaloyan Levterov; Yordan Yanchev	4 × 200 metre freestyle relay	7:21.06	13	—		Did not advance	
Kaloyan Levterov; Lyubomir Epitropov; Josif Miladinov; Kaloyan Bratanov	4 × 100 metre medley relay	3:37.92	17	—		Did not advance	

Women

Athlete	Event	Heat		Semifinal		Final	
Athlete	Event	Time	Rank	Time	Rank	Time	Rank
Gabriela Georgieva	100 metre backstroke	1:01.65	15 Q	1:01.42	13	Did not advance	
Gabriela Georgieva	200 metre backstroke	2:10.86	3 Q	2:09.95 NR	5 Q	2:10.11	6
