= Swimming at the 2024 World Aquatics Championships – Women's 100 metre backstroke =

Women's 100 metre backstroke at the 2024 World Aquatics Championships
- Venue: Aspire Dome
- Location: Doha, Qatar
- Dates: 12 February (heats and semifinals); 13 February (final)
- Competitors: 56 from 53 nations
- Winning time: 58.29

Medalists
gold medal	Claire Curzan	United States
silver medal	Iona Anderson	Australia
bronze medal	Ingrid Wilm	Canada

The Women's 100 metre backstroke competition at the 2024 World Aquatics Championships was held on 12 and 13 February 2024.

== Qualification ==
Each National Federation was permitted to enter a maximum of two qualified athletes in each individual event, but only if both of them had attained the "A" standard qualification time at approved qualifying events. For this event, the "A" standard qualification time was 1:00.59. Federations could enter one athlete into the event if they met the "B" standard qualification time. For this event, the "B" standard qualification time was 1:02.71. Athletes could also enter the event if they had met an "A" or "B" standard in a different event and their Federation had not entered anyone else. Additional considerations applied to Federations who had few swimmers enter through the standard qualification times. Federations in this category could at least enter two men and two women into the competition, all of whom could enter into up to two events.

== Records ==
Prior to the competition, the existing world and championship records were as follows.

World record	Kaylee McKeown (AUS)	57.33	Budapest, Hungary	21 October 2023
Competition record	Kaylee McKeown (AUS)	57.53	Fukuoka, Japan	25 July 2023

== Results ==
=== Heats ===
The heats were started on 12 February at 09:32.

Rank	Heat	Lane	Name	Nationality	Time	Notes
1	6	4	Claire Curzan	United States	59.72	Q
2	5	4	Ingrid Wilm	Canada	59.82	Q
3	4	3	Iona Anderson	Australia	59.88	Q
4	4	4	Jaclyn Barclay	Australia	1:00.05	Q
5	6	3	Lauren Cox	Great Britain	1:00.27	Q
6	4	6	Kathleen Dawson	Great Britain	1:00.36	Q
7	4	5	Carmen Weiler	Spain	1:00.44	Q
8	5	3	Kira Toussaint	Netherlands	1:00.50	Q
9	6	5	Maaike de Waard	Netherlands	1:00.61	Q
10	5	5	Adela Piskorska	Poland	1:01.03	Q
11	5	6	Hanna Rosvall	Sweden	1:01.20	Q
12	6	6	Anastasiya Shkurdai	Neutral Independent Athletes	1:01.43	Q
13	6	2	Camila Rebelo	Portugal	1:01.51	Q
14	6	7	Francesca Pasquino	Italy	1:01.54	Q
15	5	8	Gabriela Georgieva	Bulgaria	1:01.65	Q
16	4	2	Stephanie Au	Hong Kong	1:01.80	Q
17	4	0	Carla González	Venezuela	1:01.83	
18	5	2	Paulina Peda	Poland	1:01.87	
19	5	9	Emma Harvey	Bermuda	1:01.88	NR
20	4	7	Maria Godden	Ireland	1:01.99	
21	5	1	Andrea Berrino	Argentina	1:02.02	
22	6	9	Jillian Crooks	Cayman Islands	1:02.19	
23	5	0	Chen Xin	China	1:02.49	
24	4	8	Levenia Sim	Singapore	1:02.72	
25	6	1	Song Jae-yun	South Korea	1:02.74	
26	4	1	Eszter Szabó-Feltóthy	Hungary	1:02.80	
26	5	7	Milla Drakopoulos	South Africa	1:02.80	
28	6	8	Teia Salvino	Philippines	1:02.81	
29	6	0	Xeniya Ignatova	Kazakhstan	1:02.83	
30	3	4	Jana Marković	Serbia	1:03.70	
31	3	2	Andrea Becali	Cuba	1:04.22	
32	3	6	Celina Márquez	El Salvador	1:04.29	
33	3	7	Valerie Tarazi	Palestine	1:04.41	
33	4	9	Alexia Sotomayor	Peru	1:04.41	
35	3	1	Natalia Zaiteva	Moldova	1:04.50	
36	3	9	Donata Katai	Zimbabwe	1:04.51	
37	3	3	Carolina Cermelli	Panama	1:04.83	
38	3	0	Ganga Senavirathne	Sri Lanka	1:04.93	
39	2	4	Suvana Chetana	India	1:05.26	
40	2	2	Ariuntamir Enkh-Amgalan	Mongolia	1:05.27	NR
41	3	5	Abril Aunchayna	Uruguay	1:05.31	
42	3	8	Masniari Wolf	Indonesia	1:05.39	
43	2	3	Gaurika Singh	Nepal	1:05.47	NR
44	2	7	Elizaveta Pecherskikh	Kyrgyzstan	1:05.68	
45	2	5	Amani Al-Obaidli	Bahrain	1:06.06	
46	2	6	Eda Zeqiri	Kosovo	1:06.64	
47	1	4	Idealy Tendrinavalona	Madagascar	1:09.14	
48	2	8	Alejandra Santana	Dominican Republic	1:09.27	
49	2	0	Chanchakriya Kheun	Cambodia	1:09.31	
50	2	9	Riley Miller	U.S. Virgin Islands	1:09.47	
51	2	1	Aynura Primova	Turkmenistan	1:09.56	
52	1	5	Angelina Smythe	Seychelles	1:10.37	
53	1	7	Maleek Al-Mukthar	Libya	1:10.61	
54	1	6	Natalia Ladha	Tanzania	1:13.56	
55	1	3	Jennifer Harding-Marlin	Saint Kitts and Nevis	1:14.93	
56	1	2	Hamna Ahmed	Maldives	1:18.71	

=== Semifinals ===
The semifinals were held on 12 February at 19:53.

Rank	Heat	Lane	Name	Nationality	Time	Notes
1	2	4	Claire Curzan	United States	58.73	Q
2	1	4	Ingrid Wilm	Canada	59.55	Q
3	1	5	Jaclyn Barclay	Australia	59.83	Q
4	2	5	Iona Anderson	Australia	59.94	Q
5	2	3	Lauren Cox	Great Britain	1:00.03	Q
6	1	6	Kira Toussaint	Netherlands	1:00.37	Q
7	1	3	Kathleen Dawson	Great Britain	1:00.40	Q
8	2	2	Maaike de Waard	Netherlands	1:00.68	Q
9	2	6	Carmen Weiler	Spain	1:00.81	
10	2	1	Camila Rebelo	Portugal	1:00.91	
11	1	2	Adela Piskorska	Poland	1:00.99	
12	1	7	Anastasiya Shkurdai	Neutral Independent Athletes	1:01.24	
13	2	8	Gabriela Georgieva	Bulgaria	1:01.42	
14	1	8	Stephanie Au	Hong Kong	1:01.50	
15	2	7	Hanna Rosvall	Sweden	1:01.67	
16	1	1	Francesca Pasquino	Italy	1:01.68	

=== Final ===
The final were was on 13 February at 19:51.

Rank	Lane	Name	Nationality	Time	Notes
1st place, gold medalist(s)	4	Claire Curzan	United States	58.29	
2nd place, silver medalist(s)	6	Iona Anderson	Australia	59.12	
3rd place, bronze medalist(s)	5	Ingrid Wilm	Canada	59.18	
4	3	Jaclyn Barclay	Australia	59.28	
5	2	Lauren Cox	Great Britain	59.60	
6	1	Kathleen Dawson	Great Britain	1:00.42	
7	8	Maaike de Waard	Netherlands	1:00.64	
8	7	Kira Toussaint	Netherlands	1:00.73	

== Sources ==
- "Competition Regulations" (PDF). World Aquatics. Archived (PDF) from the original on 15 February 2026.
