= Bulgaria at the 1973 World Aquatics Championships =

- Flag of Bulgaria
- World Aquatics code: BUL
- National federation: Bulgarian Swimming
- Website: www.bul-swimming.org

in Belgrade, Yugoslavia
- Medals: Gold 0 Silver 0 Bronze 0 Total 0

World Aquatics Championships appearances
- 1973; 1975; 1978; 1982; 1986; 1991; 1994; 1998; 2001; 2003; 2005; 2007; 2009; 2011; 2013; 2015; 2017; 2019; 2022; 2023; 2024; 2025

Bulgaria competed at the 1973 World Aquatics Championships in Belgrade, Yugoslavia from August 31 to September 9.

== Swimming ==
Men

Athlete	Event	Heat		Final	
Athlete	Event	Time	Rank	Time	Rank
Stefan Georgiev	100 m freestyle	55.06	22	did not advance	
Lyudmil Stoev	100 m freestyle	56.23	28	did not advance	
Krasimir Enchev	400 m freestyle	4:24.53	24	did not advance	
Dimitar Kolarov	100 m backstroke	1:04.04	29	did not advance	
Angel Chakarov	100 m breaststroke	1:11.29	27	did not advance	
Angel Chakarov	200 m breaststroke	did not start		did not advance	
Angel Chakarov	400 m individual medley	5:08.22	26	did not advance	
Vasil Dobrev	100 m butterfly	59.99	17	did not advance	
Vasil Dobrev	200 m butterfly	2:11.95	17	did not advance	
Bulgarian team	4 × 100 m medley relay	4:14.63	14	did not advance	

Women

Athlete	Event	Heat		Final	
Athlete	Event	Time	Rank	Time	Rank
Janet Slavcheva	100 m butterfly	1:09.61	27	did not advance	
