= Curaçao at the 2022 World Aquatics Championships =

- Flag of Curaçao
- World Aquatics code: CUR
- National federation: Swimming Federation of Curaçao

in Budapest, Hungary
- Competitors: 3 in 2 sports
- Medals: Gold 0 Silver 0 Bronze 0 Total 0

World Aquatics Championships appearances
- 2015; 2017; 2019; 2022; 2023; 2024; 2025

Curaçao competed at the 2022 World Aquatics Championships in Budapest, Hungary from 17 June to 3 July.

== Artistic swimming ==
Curaçao entered one artistic swimmer.

Women

Athlete	Event	Preliminaries		Final	
Athlete	Event	Points	Rank	Points	Rank
Moramay Koomen	Solo free routine	64.9667	28	did not advance	

== Swimming ==
Curaçao entered two swimmers.

Men

Athlete	Event	Heat		Semifinal		Final	
Athlete	Event	Time	Rank	Time	Rank	Time	Rank
Mekhayl Engel	50 m backstroke	28.10	40	did not advance			
Mekhayl Engel	100 m backstroke	1:01.46	42	did not advance			

Women

Athlete	Event	Heat		Semifinal		Final	
Athlete	Event	Time	Rank	Time	Rank	Time	Rank
Samantha van Vuure	200 m backstroke	2:29.87	21	did not advance			
Samantha van Vuure	400 m medley	5:34.75	19	—N/a		did not advance	
