= Neutral Independent Athletes at the 2024 World Aquatics Championships =

- World Aquatics code: NIA
- National federation: World Aquatics

in Doha, Qatar
- Competitors: 5 in 2 sports
- Medals Ranked 31st: Gold 0 Silver 0 Bronze 2 Total 2

World Aquatics Championships appearances
- 1973; 1975; 1978; 1982; 1986; 1991; 1994; 1998; 2001; 2003; 2005; 2007; 2009; 2011; 2013; 2015; 2017; 2019; 2022; 2023; 2024; 2025

Neutral Independent Athletes competed at the 2024 World Aquatics Championships in Doha, Qatar, from 2 to 18 February.

== Medalists ==
Medal	Name	Sport	Event	Date
3rd place, bronze medalist(s)	Vasilina Khandoshka	Artistic swimming	Women's solo free routine	6 February 2024
3rd place, bronze medalist(s)	Anastasiya Shkurdai	Swimming	Women's 200 metre backstroke	17 February 2024

== Competitors ==
The following is the list of competitors in the Championships.

Neutral Independent Athletes
Sport	Belarus		Total
Sport	Men	Women	Total
Artistic swimming	0	1	1
Swimming	1	3	4
Total	1	4	5

== Artistic swimming ==
Women

Athlete	Event	Preliminaries		Final	
Athlete	Event	Points	Rank	Points	Rank
Vasilina Khandoshka	Solo technical routine	253.1917	5 Q	261.7466	4
Vasilina Khandoshka	Solo free routine	224.1771	5 Q	245.1042	3rd place, bronze medalist(s)

== Swimming ==
Neutral Independent Athletes entered 4 swimmers.

Men

Athlete	Event	Heat		Semifinal		Final	
Athlete	Event	Time	Rank	Time	Rank	Time	Rank
Ilya Shymanovich	50 metre breaststroke	26.66	1 Q	27.07	10	Did not advance	
Ilya Shymanovich	100 metre breaststroke	59.81	9 Q	59.40	8 Q	59.35	6

Women

Athlete	Event	Heat		Semifinal		Final	
Athlete	Event	Time	Rank	Time	Rank	Time	Rank
Anastasiya Kuliashova	50 metre butterfly	26.32	14 Q	26.57	16	Did not advance	
Anastasiya Kuliashova	100 metre butterfly	58.94	12 Q	59.03	14	Did not advance	
Anastasiya Shkurdai	50 metre backstroke	29.58	33	Did not advance			
Anastasiya Shkurdai	100 metre backstroke	1:01.43	12 Q	1:01.24	12	Did not advance	
Anastasiya Shkurdai	200 metre backstroke	2:11.34	5 Q	2:09.76	4 Q	2:09.08	3rd place, bronze medalist(s)
Alina Zmushka	100 metre breaststroke	1:06.77	4 Q	1:06.53	6 Q	1:06.58	6
Alina Zmushka	200 metre breaststroke	2:26.31	8 Q	2:24.14 NR	4 Q	2:24.44	4
