= Turkmenistan at the 2024 World Aquatics Championships =

- Flag of Turkmenistan
- FINA code: TKM
- National federation: National Federation of Aquatics of Turkmenistan

in Doha, Qatar
- Competitors: 4 in 1 sport
- Medals: Gold 0 Silver 0 Bronze 0 Total 0

World Aquatics Championships appearances
- 1994; 1998; 2001; 2003; 2005; 2007; 2009; 2011; 2013; 2015; 2017; 2019; 2022; 2023; 2024

Other related appearances
- Soviet Union (1973–1991)

Turkmenistan competed at the 2024 World Aquatics Championships in Doha, Qatar from 2 to 18 February.

== Competitors ==
The following is the list of competitors in the Championships.

| Sport | Men | Women | Total |
|---|---|---|---|
| Swimming | 2 | 2 | 4 |
| Total | 2 | 2 | 4 |

== Swimming ==
Turkmenistan entered 4 swimmers.

Men

| Athlete | Event | Heat | | Semifinal | | Final | |
| Athlete | Event | Time | Rank | Time | Rank | Time | Rank |
|---|---|---|---|---|---|---|---|
| Merdan Ataýew | 50 metre backstroke | 26.25 | 29 | Did not advance | | | |
| Merdan Ataýew | 100 metre backstroke | 57.21 | 37 | Did not advance | | | |
| Musa Zhalayev | 50 metre freestyle | 24.10 | 63 | Did not advance | | | |
| Musa Zhalayev | 100 metre freestyle | 52.04 | 58 | Did not advance | | | |

Women

| Athlete | Event | Heat | | Semifinal | | Final | |
| Athlete | Event | Time | Rank | Time | Rank | Time | Rank |
|---|---|---|---|---|---|---|---|
| Anastasiya Morginshtern | 50 metre freestyle | 28.98 | 75 | Did not advance | | | |
| Anastasiya Morginshtern | 100 metre freestyle | 1:02.63 | 62 | Did not advance | | | |
| Aynura Primova | 100 metre backstroke | 1:09.56 | 51 | Did not advance | | | |
| Aynura Primova | 200 metre backstroke | 2:33.02 | 32 | Did not advance | | | |
