= Swimming at the 2024 World Aquatics Championships – Women's 200 metre backstroke =

Women's 200 metre backstroke at the Swimming at the 2024 World Aquatics Championships
- Venue: Aspire Dome
- Location: Doha, Qatar
- Dates: 16 February (heats and semifinals); 17 February (final)
- Competitors: 32 from 29 nations
- Winning time: 2:05.77

Medalists
gold medal	Claire Curzan	United States
silver medal	Jaclyn Barclay	Australia
bronze medal	Anastasiya Shkurdai

The Women's 200 metre backstroke competition at the 2024 World Aquatics Championships was held on 16 and 17 February 2024.

== Qualification ==
Each National Federation was permitted to enter a maximum of two qualified athletes in each individual event, but only if both of them had attained the "A" standard qualification time at approved qualifying events. For this event, the "A" standard qualification time was 2:11.08. Federations could enter one athlete into the event if they met the "B" standard qualification time. For this event, the "B" standard qualification time was 2:15.67. Athletes could also enter the event if they had met an "A" or "B" standard in a different event and their Federation had not entered anyone else. Additional considerations applied to Federations who had few swimmers enter through the standard qualification times. Federations in this category could at least enter two men and two women into the competition, all of whom could enter into up to two events.

== Records ==
Prior to the competition, the existing world and championship records were as follows.

World record	Kaylee McKeown (AUS)	2:03.14	Sydney, Australia	10 March 2023
Competition record	Regan Smith (USA)	2:03.35	Gwangju, South Korea	26 July 2019

== Results ==
=== Heats ===
The Heats were held on 16 February at 09:52.

Rank	Heat	Lane	Name	Nationality	Time	Notes
1	4	4	Claire Curzan	United States	2:10.50	Q
2	2	4	Jaclyn Barclay	Australia	2:10.82	Q
3	2	2	Gabriela Georgieva	Bulgaria	2:10.86	Q
4	4	5	Eszter Szabó-Feltóthy	Hungary	2:10.95	Q
5	4	3	Anastasiya Shkurdai	Neutral Independent Athletes	2:11.34	Q
6	3	6	Dóra Molnár	Hungary	2:11.35	Q
7	3	5	Laura Bernat	Poland	2:11.51	Q
8	2	5	Adela Piskorska	Poland	2:11.65	Q
9	3	2	Anastasia Gorbenko	Israel	2:11.78	Q
10	4	7	Sun Mingxia	China	2:11.79	Q
11	3	4	Freya Colbert	Great Britain	2:12.08	Q
12	4	6	África Zamorano	Spain	2:12.55	Q
13	2	3	Lilla Bognar	United States	2:12.56	Q
14	2	6	Ingrid Wilm	Canada	2:12.67	Q
15	4	2	Cindy Cheung	Hong Kong	2:13.11	Q
16	3	7	Hannah Pearse	South Africa	2:13.26	Q
17	2	7	Maria Godden	Ireland	2:13.30	
18	3	3	Camila Rebelo	Portugal	2:13.33	
19	3	1	Xeniya Ignatova	Kazakhstan	2:14.22	
20	4	1	Kristen Romano	Puerto Rico	2:14.46	
21	4	8	Chua Xiandi	Philippines	2:15.01	
22	2	1	Kim Seung-won	South Korea	2:17.16	
23	2	8	Janja Šegel	Slovenia	2:17.31	
24	2	0	Celina Márquez	El Salvador	2:18.69	
25	3	8	Alexia Sotomayor	Peru	2:20.05	
26	4	0	Natalia Zaiteva	Moldova	2:20.07	
27	3	0	Carolina Cermelli	Panama	2:20.33	
28	4	9	Andrea Becali	Cuba	2:21.54	
29	1	4	Ariana Dirkzwager	Laos	2:24.69	
30	1	5	Jessica Humphrey	Namibia	2:26.07	
31	3	9	Ganga Senavirathne	Sri Lanka	2:29.23	
32	1	3	Aynura Primova	Turkmenistan	2:33.02	

=== Semifinals ===
The semifinals were held on 16 February at 19:20.

Rank	Heat	Lane	Name	Nationality	Time	Notes
1	2	4	Claire Curzan	United States	2:07.01	Q
2	1	4	Jaclyn Barclay	Australia	2:08.85	Q
3	1	5	Eszter Szabó-Feltóthy	Hungary	2:09.42	Q
4	2	3	Anastasiya Shkurdai	Neutral Independent Athletes	2:09.76	Q
5	2	5	Gabriela Georgieva	Bulgaria	2:09.95	Q, NR
6	2	6	Laura Bernat	Poland	2:10.00	Q
7	1	3	Dóra Molnár	Hungary	2:10.31	Q
8	2	7	Freya Colbert	Great Britain	2:10.67	Q
9	2	2	Anastasia Gorbenko	Israel	2:10.94	
10	2	1	Lilla Bognar	United States	2:11.26	
11	1	7	África Zamorano	Spain	2:11.44	
12	1	6	Adela Piskorska	Poland	2:11.57	
13	1	1	Ingrid Wilm	Canada	2:11.88	
14	1	2	Sun Mingxia	China	2:12.07	
15	1	8	Hannah Pearse	South Africa	2:13.29	
16	2	8	Cindy Cheung	Hong Kong	2:13.85	

=== Final ===
The final was held on 17 February at 19:16.

Rank	Lane	Name	Nationality	Time	Notes
1st place, gold medalist(s)	4	Claire Curzan	United States	2:05.77	
2nd place, silver medalist(s)	5	Jaclyn Barclay	Australia	2:07.03	
3rd place, bronze medalist(s)	6	Anastasiya Shkurdai	Neutral Independent Athletes	2:09.08	
4	3	Eszter Szabó-Feltóthy	Hungary	2:09.76	
5	7	Laura Bernat	Poland	2:09.92	
6	2	Gabriela Georgieva	Bulgaria	2:10.11	
7	1	Dóra Molnár	Hungary	2:11.01	
8	8	Freya Colbert	Great Britain	2:11.22	

== Sources ==
- "Competition Regulations" (PDF). World Aquatics. Archived (PDF) from the original on 15 February 2026.
