= Turkmenistan at the 2023 World Aquatics Championships =

- Flag of Turkmenistan
- FINA code: TKM
- National federation: National Federation of Aquatics of Turkmenistan

in Fukuoka, Japan
- Competitors: 4 in 1 sport
- Medals: Gold 0 Silver 0 Bronze 0 Total 0

World Aquatics Championships appearances
- 1994; 1998; 2001; 2003; 2005; 2007; 2009; 2011; 2013; 2015; 2017; 2019; 2022; 2023; 2024

Other related appearances
- Soviet Union (1973–1991)

Turkmenistan is set to compete at the 2023 World Aquatics Championships in Fukuoka, Japan from 14 to 30 July.

== Swimming ==
Turkmenistan entered 4 swimmers.

Men

Athlete	Event	Heat		Semifinal		Final	
Athlete	Event	Time	Rank	Time	Rank	Time	Rank
Merdan Ataýew	100 metre backstroke	56.96	41	Did not advance			
Merdan Ataýew	200 metre backstroke	2:07.48	35	Did not advance			
Musa Zhalayev	50 metre freestyle	24.29	75	Did not advance			
Musa Zhalayev	100 metre freestyle	52.29	74	Did not advance			

Women

Athlete	Event	Heat		Semifinal		Final	
Athlete	Event	Time	Rank	Time	Rank	Time	Rank
Anastasiya Morginshtern	50 metre freestyle	28.73	74	Did not advance			
Anastasiya Morginshtern	100 metre freestyle	1:03.86	65	Did not advance			
Aynura Primova	100 metre backstroke	1:08.97	55	Did not advance			
Aynura Primova	200 metre backstroke	2:32.68	40	Did not advance			
