= Curaçao at the 2017 World Aquatics Championships =

- Flag of Curaçao
- World Aquatics code: CUR
- National federation: Swimming Federation of Curaçao

in Budapest, Hungary
- Competitors: 3 in 1 sport
- Medals: Gold 0 Silver 0 Bronze 0 Total 0

World Aquatics Championships appearances
- 2015; 2017; 2019; 2022; 2023; 2024; 2025

Curaçao competed at the 2017 World Aquatics Championships in Budapest, Hungary, from 14 July to 30 July.

== Swimming ==
Curaçao has received a Universality invitation from FINA to send three swimmers (two men and one woman) to the World Championships.

Athlete	Event	Heat		Semifinal		Final	
Athlete	Event	Time	Rank	Time	Rank	Time	Rank
Serginni Marten	Men's 50 m freestyle	24.27	=86	did not advance			
Serginni Marten	Men's 100 m freestyle	53.18	76	did not advance			
Rainier Rafaela	Men's 50 m breaststroke	29.97	56	did not advance			
Rainier Rafaela	Men's 100 m breaststroke	1:06.96	62	did not advance			
Chade Nersicio	Women's 50 m freestyle	26.91	46	did not advance			
Chade Nersicio	Women's 50 m butterfly	28.41	41	did not advance			
