= Curaçao at the 2019 World Aquatics Championships =

- Flag of Curaçao
- World Aquatics code: CUR
- National federation: Swimming Federation of Curaçao

in Gwangju, South Korea
- Competitors: 3 in 1 sport
- Medals: Gold 0 Silver 0 Bronze 0 Total 0

World Aquatics Championships appearances
- 2015; 2017; 2019; 2022; 2023; 2024; 2025

Curaçao competed at the 2019 World Aquatics Championships in Gwangju, South Korea from 12 to 28 July.

== Swimming ==
Curaçao entered three swimmers.

Men

Athlete	Event	Heat		Semifinal		Final	
Athlete	Event	Time	Rank	Time	Rank	Time	Rank
Seggio Bernardina	50 m butterfly	25.24	=58	did not advance			
Seggio Bernardina	100 m butterfly	56.54	57	did not advance			
Rainier Rafaela	50 m breaststroke	29.23	52	did not advance			
Rainier Rafaela	100 m breaststroke	1:06.41	71	did not advance			

Women

Athlete	Event	Heat		Semifinal		Final	
Athlete	Event	Time	Rank	Time	Rank	Time	Rank
Chade Nersicio	50 m freestyle	27.13	49	did not advance			
Chade Nersicio	50 m butterfly	28.45	41	did not advance			
