= Curaçao at the 2023 World Aquatics Championships =

- Flag of Curaçao
- World Aquatics code: CUR
- National federation: Curacao Aquatics Federation

in Fukuoka, Japan
- Competitors: 2 in 1 sport
- Medals: Gold 0 Silver 0 Bronze 0 Total 0

World Aquatics Championships appearances
- 2015; 2017; 2019; 2022; 2023; 2024; 2025

Curaçao is set to compete at the 2023 World Aquatics Championships in Fukuoka, Japan from 14 to 30 July.

== Swimming ==
Curaçao entered 2 swimmers.

Men

Athlete	Event	Heat		Semifinal		Final	
Athlete	Event	Time	Rank	Time	Rank	Time	Rank
Jayden Loran	50 metre breaststroke	30.32	50	Did not advance			
Jayden Loran	100 metre breaststroke	1:08.47	64	Did not advance			

Women

Athlete	Event	Heat		Semifinal		Final	
Athlete	Event	Time	Rank	Time	Rank	Time	Rank
Samantha van Vuure	200 metre backstroke	2:31.60	39	Did not advance			
Samantha van Vuure	400 metre individual medley	5:32.86	34	—N/a		Did not advance	
