= Swimming at the 2023 World Aquatics Championships – Women's 200 metre backstroke =

Women's 200 metre backstroke at the 2023 World Aquatics Championships
- Venue: Marine Messe Fukuoka
- Location: Fukuoka, Japan
- Dates: 28 July (heats and semifinals); 29 July (final)
- Competitors: 42 from 35 nations
- Winning time: 2:03.85

Medalists
gold medal	Kaylee McKeown	Australia
silver medal	Regan Smith	United States
bronze medal	Peng Xuwei	China

The Women's 200 metre backstroke competition at the 2023 World Aquatics Championships was held on 28 and 29 July 2023.

== Records ==
Prior to the competition, the existing world and championship records were as follows.

World record	Kaylee McKeown (AUS)	2:03.14	Sydney, Australia	10 March 2023
Competition record	Regan Smith (USA)	2:03.35	Gwangju, South Korea	26 July 2019

== Results ==
=== Heats ===
The heats were started on 28 July at 10:52.

Rank	Heat	Lane	Name	Nationality	Time	Notes
1	4	4	Regan Smith	United States	2:07.24	Q
2	5	5	Peng Xuwei	China	2:08.68	Q
3	5	2	Laura Bernat	Poland	2:09.08	Q, NR
4	4	3	Katie Shanahan	Great Britain	2:09.18	Q
5	5	4	Kaylee McKeown	Australia	2:09.30	Q
6	4	5	Kylie Masse	Canada	2:09.31	Q
7	3	4	Rhyan White	United States	2:09.68	Q
8	4	2	Africa Zamorano	Spain	2:09.99	Q
9	3	3	Eszter Szabó-Feltóthy	Hungary	2:10.38	Q
10	4	7	Jenna Forrester	Australia	2:10.46	Q
11	3	5	Margherita Panziera	Italy	2:10.90	Q
12	3	8	Gabriela Georgieva	Bulgaria	2:11.22	Q
13	3	2	Rio Shirai	Japan	2:11.24	Q
14	5	8	Lee Eun-ji	South Korea	2:11.78	Q
15	3	1	Camila Rebelo	Portugal	2:11.80	Q
16	5	6	Katalin Burián	Hungary	2:11.94	Q
17	4	1	Hanane Hironaka	Japan	2:12.57	
18	4	8	Tatiana Salcutan	Moldova	2:12.65	
19	5	7	Ingrid Wilm	Canada	2:12.67	
20	5	1	Lena Grabowski	Austria	2:12.79	
21	5	3	Liu Yaxin	China	2:13.42	
22	3	6	Adela Piskorska	Poland	2:13.74	
23	4	0	Chua Xiandi	Suspended Member Federation	2:13.80	
24	4	6	Emma Terebo	France	2:13.95	
25	2	4	Ingeborg Løyning	Norway	2:13.97	
26	5	0	Athena Meneses	Mexico	2:15.14	
27	4	9	Xeniya Ignatova	Kazakhstan	2:16.06	
28	3	9	Janja Šegel	Slovenia	2:17.20	
29	2	6	Carolina Cermelli	Panama	2:18.50	NR
30	2	2	Anishta Teeluck	Mauritius	2:18.63	NR
31	2	1	Andrea Becali	Cuba	2:18.65	
32	3	0	Aleksa Gold	Estonia	2:19.47	
33	2	8	Elizabeth Jimenez	Dominican Republic	2:19.84	
34	5	9	Alexia Sotomayor	Peru	2:20.78	
35	2	7	Danielle Titus	Barbados	2:21.36	
36	2	3	Elisabeth Erlendsdóttir	Faroe Islands	2:22.28	
37	2	0	Ganga Senavirathne	Sri Lanka	2:23.36	
38	1	3	Vivian Xhemollari	Albania	2:24.30	
39	2	9	Samantha van Vuure	Curaçao	2:31.60	
40	1	4	Aynura Primova	Turkmenistan	2:32.68	
41	1	5	Jennifer Harding-Marlin	Saint Kitts and Nevis	2:37.83	
	2	5	Hanna Rosvall	Sweden	DNS	
	3	7	Aviv Barzelay	Israel	DSQ	

=== Semifinals ===
The semifinals were held on 28 July at 20:20.

Rank	Heat	Lane	Name	Nationality	Time	Notes
1	1	4	Peng Xuwei	China	2:07.40	Q
2	2	4	Regan Smith	United States	2:07.52	Q
3	2	3	Kaylee McKeown	Australia	2:07.89	Q
4	1	5	Katie Shanahan	Great Britain	2:08.32	Q
5	1	3	Kylie Masse	Canada	2:08.51	Q
6	2	5	Laura Bernat	Poland	2:08.96	Q, NR
7	2	6	Rhyan White	United States	2:09.13	Q
8	1	2	Jenna Forrester	Australia	2:09.74	Q
9	2	2	Eszter Szabó-Feltóthy	Hungary	2:09.90	
10	2	7	Margherita Panziera	Italy	2:10.65	
11	1	6	Africa Zamorano	Spain	2:10.76	
12	1	8	Katalin Burián	Hungary	2:11.47	
13	1	7	Gabriela Georgieva	Bulgaria	2:11.99	
14	2	1	Rio Shirai	Japan	2:12.45	
15	2	8	Camila Rebelo	Portugal	2:12.47	
16	1	1	Lee Eun-ji	South Korea	2:13.65	

=== Final ===
The final was started on 29 July at 20:57.

Rank	Lane	Name	Nationality	Time	Notes
1st place, gold medalist(s)	3	Kaylee McKeown	Australia	2:03.85	
2nd place, silver medalist(s)	5	Regan Smith	United States	2:04.94	
3rd place, bronze medalist(s)	4	Peng Xuwei	China	2:06.74	
4	6	Katie Shanahan	Great Britain	2:07.45	
5	2	Kylie Masse	Canada	2:07.52	
6	1	Rhyan White	United States	2:08.43	
7	7	Laura Bernat	Poland	2:10.68	
8	8	Jenna Forrester	Australia	2:11.44	
