= Turkmenistan at the 2022 World Aquatics Championships =

- Flag of Turkmenistan
- FINA code: TKM
- National federation: Turkmenistan Swimming Federation

in Budapest, Hungary
- Competitors: 4 in 1 sport
- Medals: Gold 0 Silver 0 Bronze 0 Total 0

World Aquatics Championships appearances
- 1994; 1998; 2001; 2003; 2005; 2007; 2009; 2011; 2013; 2015; 2017; 2019; 2022; 2023; 2024

Other related appearances
- Soviet Union (1973–1991)

Turkmenistan competed at the 2022 World Aquatics Championships in Budapest, Hungary from 17 June to 3 July.

== Swimming ==
Turkmenistan entered four swimmers.

Men

Athlete	Event	Heat		Semifinal		Final	
Athlete	Event	Time	Rank	Time	Rank	Time	Rank
Eminguly Ballykov	100 m freestyle	55.99	87	did not advance			
Eminguly Ballykov	200 m freestyle	2:05.06	60	did not advance			
Musa Zhalayev	50 m freestyle	24.15	61	did not advance			
Musa Zhalayev	50 m butterfly	26.21	58	did not advance			

Women

Athlete	Event	Heat		Semifinal		Final	
Athlete	Event	Time	Rank	Time	Rank	Time	Rank
Anastasiya Morginshtern	100 m freestyle	1:02.43	47	did not advance			
Anastasiya Morginshtern	50 m butterfly	30.59	51	did not advance			
Aynura Primova	50 m backstroke	32.91	35	did not advance			
Aynura Primova	100 m backstroke	1:13.05	41	did not advance			
