= Curaçao at the 2024 World Aquatics Championships =

- Flag of Curaçao
- World Aquatics code: CUR
- National federation: Curacao Aquatics Federation

in Doha, Qatar
- Competitors: 3 in 2 sports
- Medals: Gold 0 Silver 0 Bronze 0 Total 0

World Aquatics Championships appearances
- 2015; 2017; 2019; 2022; 2023; 2024; 2025

Curaçao competed at the 2024 World Aquatics Championships in Doha, Qatar from 2 to 18 February.

== Competitors ==
The following is the list of competitors in the Championships.

Sport	Men	Women	Total
Artistic swimming	0	2	2
Swimming	1	0	1
Total	1	2	3

== Artistic swimming ==
Women

Athlete	Event	Preliminaries		Final	
Athlete	Event	Points	Rank	Points	Rank
Grace Borrebach; Kyra van den Berg	Duet technical routine	137.0949	40	Did not advance	
Grace Borrebach; Kyra van den Berg	Duet free routine	81.0250	38	Did not advance	

== Swimming ==
Curaçao entered 1 swimmers.

Men

Athlete	Event	Heat		Semifinal		Final	
Athlete	Event	Time	Rank	Time	Rank	Time	Rank
Jayden Loran	50 metre breaststroke	29.78	45	Did not advance			
Jayden Loran	100 metre breaststroke	1:08.70	66	Did not advance			
