= Iraq at the 2024 World Aquatics Championships =

- Flag of Iraq
- FINA code: IRQ
- National federation: Iraq Aquatics

in Doha, Qatar
- Competitors: 2 in 1 sport
- Medals: Gold 0 Silver 0 Bronze 0 Total 0

World Aquatics Championships appearances
- 1998; 2001; 2003; 2005; 2007; 2009; 2011; 2013; 2015; 2017; 2019; 2022; 2023; 2024

Iraq competed at the 2024 World Aquatics Championships in Doha, Qatar from 2 to 18 February.

== Competitors ==
The following is the list of competitors in the Championships.

Sport	Men	Women	Total
Swimming	2	0	2
Total	2	0	2

== Swimming ==
Iraq entered 2 swimmers.

Men

Athlete	Event	Heat		Semifinal		Final	
Athlete	Event	Time	Rank	Time	Rank	Time	Rank
Hasan Al-Zinkee	50 metre backstroke	28.97	42	Did not advance			
Hasan Al-Zinkee	100 metre butterfly	59.77	60	Did not advance			
Ghaith Hussein	50 metre breaststroke	31.95	50	Did not advance			
Ghaith Hussein	100 metre breaststroke	1:10.28	68	Did not advance			
