= Iraq at the 2017 World Aquatics Championships =

- Flag of Iraq
- FINA code: IRQ
- National federation: Iraq Swimming Federation

in Budapest, Hungary
- Competitors: 3 in 1 sport
- Medals: Gold 0 Silver 0 Bronze 0 Total 0

World Aquatics Championships appearances
- 1998; 2001; 2003; 2005; 2007; 2009; 2011; 2013; 2015; 2017; 2019; 2022; 2023; 2024

Iraq competed at the 2017 World Aquatics Championships in Budapest, Hungary from 14 July to 30 July.

== Swimming ==
Iraq has received a Universality invitation from FINA to send three swimmers (two men and one woman) to the World Championships.

Athlete	Event	Heat		Semifinal		Final	
Athlete	Event	Time	Rank	Time	Rank	Time	Rank
Abdullah Al-Doori	Men's 50 m butterfly	26.28	60	did not advance			
Abdullah Al-Doori	Men's 100 m butterfly	58.01	64	did not advance			
Bakr Al-Dulaimi	Men's 50 m freestyle	24.49	=91	did not advance			
Bakr Al-Dulaimi	Men's 100 m freestyle	53.12	75	did not advance			
Honia Ibrahim	Women's 100 m breaststroke	1:17.48	=44	did not advance			
Honia Ibrahim	Women's 200 m breaststroke	2:45.37	31	did not advance			
