= Swimming at the 2024 World Aquatics Championships – Men's 100 metre breaststroke =

Men's 100 metre breaststroke at the 2024 World Aquatics Championships
- Venue: Aspire Dome
- Location: Doha, Qatar
- Dates: 11 February (heats and semifinals); 12 February (final)
- Competitors: 75 from 70 nations
- Winning time: 58.57

Medalists
gold medal	Nic Fink	United States
silver medal	Nicolò Martinenghi	Italy
bronze medal	Adam Peaty	Great Britain

The Men's 100 metre breaststroke competition at the 2024 World Aquatics Championships was held on 11 and 12 February 2024.

== Qualification ==
Each National Federation was permitted to enter a maximum of two qualified athletes in each individual event, but only if both of them had attained the "A" standard qualification time at approved qualifying events. For this event, the "A" standard qualification time was 59.75 seconds. Federations could enter one athlete into the event if they met the "B" standard qualification time. For this event, the "B" standard qualification time was 1:01.84. Athletes could also enter the event if they had met an "A" or "B" standard in a different event and their Federation had not entered anyone else. Additional considerations applied to Federations who had few swimmers enter through the standard qualification times. Federations in this category could at least enter two men and two women into the competition, all of whom could enter into up to two events.

== Records ==
Prior to the competition, the existing world and championship records were as follows.

World record	Adam Peaty (GBR)	56.88	Gwangju, South Korea	21 July 2019
Competition record	Adam Peaty (GBR)	56.88	Gwangju, South Korea	21 July 2019

== Results ==
=== Heats ===
The heats were started on 11 February at 11:10.

Rank	Heat	Lane	Name	Nationality	Time	Notes
1	8	4	Nic Fink	United States	59.19	Q
2	6	4	Nicolò Martinenghi	Italy	59.27	Q
3	8	3	Adam Peaty	Great Britain	59.34	Q
4	6	3	Caspar Corbeau	Netherlands	59.38	Q
5	8	5	Lucas Matzerath	Germany	59.43	Q
6	6	2	Jake Foster	United States	59.61	Q
6	7	4	Arno Kamminga	Netherlands	59.61	Q
8	7	5	Melvin Imoudu	Germany	59.72	Q
9	6	1	Ilya Shymanovich	Neutral Independent Athletes	59.81	Q
9	7	3	Sam Williamson	Australia	59.81	Q
11	7	2	Andrius Šidlauskas	Lithuania	59.84	Q
12	8	6	Ludovico Viberti	Italy	59.86	Q
13	7	7	Dong Zhihao	China	59.97	Q
14	8	2	Choi Dong-yeol	South Korea	1:00.15	Q
15	6	5	Berkay Ömer Öğretir	Turkey	1:00.27	Q
16	7	6	Denis Petrashov	Kyrgyzstan	1:00.47	Q
17	6	6	James Wilby	Great Britain	1:00.49	
18	8	7	Bernhard Reitshammer	Austria	1:00.50	
19	8	8	Matti Mattsson	Finland	1:00.57	
20	7	1	Darragh Greene	Ireland	1:00.70	
21	6	0	Maksym Ovchinnikov	Ukraine	1:00.72	
22	6	7	Jan Kałusowski	Poland	1:00.74	
23	6	8	James Dergousoff	Canada	1:00.77	
24	5	7	Peter John Stevens	Slovenia	1:00.87	
25	8	1	Miguel de Lara	Mexico	1:00.88	
26	8	0	Jérémy Desplanches	Switzerland	1:00.90	
27	6	9	Carles Coll	Spain	1:01.50	
28	5	5	Matthew Randle	South Africa	1:01.80	
29	5	3	Francisco Robalo	Portugal	1:01.83	
30	4	2	Alexandre Grand'Pierre	Haiti	1:01.85	
31	8	9	Tonislav Sabev	Bulgaria	1:01.95	
32	5	8	Xavier Ruiz	Puerto Rico	1:02.05	
33	5	4	Ronan Wantenaar	Namibia	1:02.09	
34	7	9	Vojtěch Netrh	Czech Republic	1:02.13	
35	4	6	Adam Chillingworth	Hong Kong	1:02.44	
35	7	8	Jorge Murillo	Colombia	1:02.44	
37	5	6	Arsen Kozhakhmetov	Kazakhstan	1:02.53	
38	5	9	Jadon Wuilliez	Antigua and Barbuda	1:02.54	
39	5	1	Julio Horrego	Honduras	1:02.64	
40	7	0	Phạm Thanh Bảo	Vietnam	1:02.94	
41	4	3	Likhith Selvaraj	India	1:02.96	
42	3	7	Patrick Pelegrina	Andorra	1:03.08	
43	4	8	Panayiotis Panaretos	Cyprus	1:03.35	
44	3	5	Adrian Robinson	Botswana	1:03.42	
45	5	0	Chao Man Hou	Macau	1:03.40	
46	4	5	Muhammad Raharjo	Indonesia	1:03.46	
47	3	4	Denis Svet	Moldova	1:03.62	
48	5	2	Amro Al-Wir	Jordan	1:03.72	
49	4	1	Daniils Bobrovs	Latvia	1:03.85	
50	3	3	Vicente Villanueva	Chile	1:03.91	
51	3	6	Giacomo Casadei	San Marino	1:04.11	
52	4	0	Tasi Limtiaco	Federated States of Micronesia	1:04.16	
53	3	0	Jacob Story	Cook Islands	1:04.32	
54	2	6	Abobakr Abass	Sudan	1:04.40	
55	1	6	Munzer Kabbara	Lebanon	1:04.54	NR
56	4	4	Tomas Peribonio	Ecuador	1:04.74	
57	2	4	Matthew Lawrence	Mozambique	1:04.75	
58	3	8	Ashot Chakhoyan	Armenia	1:04.92	
59	4	7	Jonathan Raharvel	Madagascar	1:05.08	
60	3	1	Luis Weekes	Barbados	1:06.27	
61	2	5	Jonathan Chung	Mauritius	1:06.31	
62	3	9	Saud Ghali	Bahrain	1:07.19	
63	2	1	Omar Al-Hammadi	United Arab Emirates	1:08.23	
64	1	5	Thomas Chen	Papua New Guinea	1:08.39	
65	2	7	Osama Trabulsi	Syria	1:08.62	
66	2	2	Jayden Loran	Curaçao	1:08.70	
67	3	2	Roberto Bonilla	Guatemala	1:09.46	
68	2	0	Ghaith Hussein	Iraq	1:10.28	
69	2	8	Chadd Ng	Eswatini	1:10.55	
70	1	8	Fahim Anwari	Afghanistan	1:10.86	
71	1	1	Sébastien Kouma	Mali	1:14.39	
72	1	0	Mubal Azzam Ibrahim	Maldives	1:14.58	NR
73	1	3	Fodé Camara	Guinea	1:16.17	
74	2	9	Jion Hosei	Palau	1:16.30	
	1	4	Rashed Al-Tarmoom	Kuwait	Did not start	
	1	7	Jainny Pinto	São Tomé and Príncipe	Did not start	
	2	3	Micah Masei	American Samoa	Did not start	
	4	9	Abdul Aziz Al-Obaidly	Qatar	Did not start	
	1	2	Damien Shamambo	Zambia	Disqualified	

=== Semifinals ===
The semifinals were started on 11 February at 19:50.

Rank	Heat	Lane	Name	Nationality	Time	Notes
1	2	5	Adam Peaty	Great Britain	58.60	Q
2	2	4	Nic Fink	United States	58.73	Q
3	2	6	Arno Kamminga	Netherlands	58.87	Q
4	1	4	Nicolò Martinenghi	Italy	59.13	Q
5	2	3	Lucas Matzerath	Germany	59.30	Q
6	1	5	Caspar Corbeau	Netherlands	59.33	Q
7	1	2	Sam Williamson	Australia	59.35	Q
8	2	2	Ilya Shymanovich	Neutral Independent Athletes	59.40	Q
9	1	3	Jake Foster	United States	59.48	
10	1	7	Ludovico Viberti	Italy	59.61	
11	1	1	Choi Dong-yeol	South Korea	59.74	
12	2	7	Andrius Šidlauskas	Lithuania	59.79	
13	1	8	Denis Petrashov	Kyrgyzstan	59.82	
14	1	6	Melvin Imoudu	Germany	1:00.08	
15	2	8	Berkay Ömer Öğretir	Turkey	1:00.18	
16	2	1	Dong Zhihao	China	1:00.45	

=== Final ===
The final was held on 12 February at 19:02.

Rank	Lane	Name	Nationality	Time	Notes
1st place, gold medalist(s)	5	Nic Fink	United States	58.57	
2nd place, silver medalist(s)	6	Nicolò Martinenghi	Italy	58.84	
3rd place, bronze medalist(s)	4	Adam Peaty	Great Britain	59.10	
4	1	Sam Williamson	Australia	59.21	
5	3	Arno Kamminga	Netherlands	59.22	
6	8	Ilya Shymanovich	Neutral Independent Athletes	59.35	
7	2	Lucas Matzerath	Germany	59.37	
7	7	Caspar Corbeau	Netherlands	59.37	

== Sources ==
- "Competition Regulations" (PDF). World Aquatics. Archived (PDF) from the original on 15 February 2026.
