= Curaçao at the 2015 World Aquatics Championships =

- Flag of Curaçao
- FINA code: CUR
- National federation: Swimming Federation of Curaçao

in Kazan, Russia
- Competitors: 3 in 1 sport
- Medals: Gold 0 Silver 0 Bronze 0 Total 0

World Aquatics Championships appearances
- 2015; 2017; 2019; 2022; 2023; 2024

Curaçao competed at the 2015 World Aquatics Championships in Kazan, Russia from 24 July to 9 August 2015.

== Swimming ==
Curaçao swimmers have achieved qualifying standards in the following events (up to a maximum of 2 swimmers in each event at the A-standard entry time, and 1 at the B-standard):

Men

Athlete	Event	Heat		Semifinal		Final	
Athlete	Event	Time	Rank	Time	Rank	Time	Rank
Serginni Marten	50 m breaststroke	30.97	60	did not advance			
Serginni Marten	100 m breaststroke	1:07.34	66	did not advance			

Women

Athlete	Event	Heat		Semifinal		Final	
Athlete	Event	Time	Rank	Time	Rank	Time	Rank
Bo-Anne Bos	1500 m freestyle	18:57.27	25	—		did not advance	
Bo-Anne Bos	100 m butterfly	1:12.43	64	did not advance			
Chade Nercisio	50 m breaststroke	35.30	54	did not advance			
Chade Nercisio	50 m butterfly	30.23	54	did not advance			
