= Turkmenistan at the 2013 World Aquatics Championships =

- Flag of Turkmenistan
- FINA code: TKM
- National federation: Turkmenistan Swimming Federation

in Barcelona, Spain
- Competitors: 3 in 1 sports
- Medals: Gold 0 Silver 0 Bronze 0 Total 0

World Aquatics Championships appearances
- 1994; 1998; 2001; 2003; 2005; 2007; 2009; 2011; 2013; 2015; 2017; 2019; 2022; 2023; 2024

Other related appearances
- Soviet Union (1973–1991)

Turkmenistan competed at the 2013 World Aquatics Championships in Barcelona, Spain between 19 July and 4 August 2013.

== Swimming ==
Turkmenistani swimmers achieved qualifying standards in the following events (up to a maximum of 2 swimmers in each event at the A-standard entry time, and 1 at the B-standard):

Men

Athlete	Event	Heat		Semifinal		Final	
Athlete	Event	Time	Rank	Time	Rank	Time	Rank
Suleyman Atayev	50 m freestyle	25.81	75	did not advance			
Suleyman Atayev	200 m freestyle	2:13.46	67	did not advance			
Sergeý Krowýakow	100 m freestyle	55.41	70	did not advance			
Sergeý Krowýakow	50 m butterfly	26.79	64	did not advance			

Women

Athlete	Event	Heat		Semifinal		Final	
Athlete	Event	Time	Rank	Time	Rank	Time	Rank
Merjen Saryýewa	50 m freestyle	29.63	65	did not advance			
Merjen Saryýewa	100 m freestyle	1:05.96	65	did not advance			
