= Iraq at the 2023 World Aquatics Championships =

- Flag of Iraq
- FINA code: IRQ
- National federation: Iraq Aquatics

in Fukuoka, Japan
- Competitors: 2 in 1 sport

World Aquatics Championships appearances
- 1998; 2001; 2003; 2005; 2007; 2009; 2011; 2013; 2015; 2017; 2019; 2022; 2023; 2024

Iraq is set to compete at the 2023 World Aquatics Championships in Fukuoka, Japan from 14 to 30 July.

== Swimming ==
Iraq entered 2 swimmers.

Men

Athlete	Event	Heat		Semifinal		Final	
Athlete	Event	Time	Rank	Time	Rank	Time	Rank
Omer Huraish	50 metre backstroke	29.88	57	Did not advance			
Omer Huraish	100 metre backstroke	1:03.15	59	Did not advance			
Hussein Suwaed	200 metre freestyle	1:59.69	67	Did not advance			
Hussein Suwaed	200 metre individual medley	2:20.23	47	Did not advance			
