= Turkmenistan at the 2015 World Aquatics Championships =

- Flag of Turkmenistan
- FINA code: TKM
- National federation: Turkmenistan Swimming Federation

in Kazan, Russia
- Competitors: 4 in 1 sport
- Medals: Gold 0 Silver 0 Bronze 0 Total 0

World Aquatics Championships appearances
- 1994; 1998; 2001; 2003; 2005; 2007; 2009; 2011; 2013; 2015; 2017; 2019; 2022; 2023; 2024

Other related appearances
- Soviet Union (1973–1991)

Turkmenistan competed at the 2015 World Aquatics Championships in Kazan, Russia from 24 July to 9 August 2015.

== Swimming ==
Turkmen swimmers have achieved qualifying standards in the following events (up to a maximum of 2 swimmers in each event at the A-standard entry time, and 1 at the B-standard):

Men

| Athlete | Event | Heat | | Semifinal | | Final | |
| Athlete | Event | Time | Rank | Time | Rank | Time | Rank |
|---|---|---|---|---|---|---|---|
| Merdan Ataýew | 50 m backstroke | 26.64 | 45 | did not advance | | | |
| Merdan Ataýew | 100 m backstroke | 57.57 | 49 | did not advance | | | |
| Valentin Gorshkov | 50 m freestyle | 25.07 | 77 | did not advance | | | |
| Valentin Gorshkov | 100 m freestyle | 54.28 | 88 | did not advance | | | |

Women

| Athlete | Event | Heat | | Semifinal | | Final | |
| Athlete | Event | Time | Rank | Time | Rank | Time | Rank |
|---|---|---|---|---|---|---|---|
| Merjen Saryýewa | 50 m freestyle | 30.17 | 90 | did not advance | | | |
| Merjen Saryýewa | 100 m freestyle | 1:05.85 | 85 | did not advance | | | |
| Darya Semënova | 50 m breaststroke | 37.64 | 59 | did not advance | | | |
| Darya Semënova | 100 m breaststroke | 1:23.19 | 65 | did not advance | | | |
