= Iraq at the 2013 World Aquatics Championships =

- Flag of Iraq
- FINA code: IRQ
- National federation: Iraq Swimming Federation

in Barcelona, Spain
- Competitors: 2 in 1 sports
- Medals: Gold 0 Silver 0 Bronze 0 Total 0

World Aquatics Championships appearances
- 1998; 2001; 2003; 2005; 2007; 2009; 2011; 2013; 2015; 2017; 2019; 2022; 2023; 2024

Iraq competed at the 2013 World Aquatics Championships in Barcelona, Spain between 19 July and 4 August 2013.

== Swimming ==
Iraqi swimmers achieved qualifying standards in the following events (up to a maximum of 2 swimmers in each event at the A-standard entry time, and 1 at the B-standard):

Men

Athlete	Event	Heat		Semifinal		Final	
Athlete	Event	Time	Rank	Time	Rank	Time	Rank
Ahmed Al-Dulaimi	50 m freestyle	25.32	67	did not advance			
Ahmed Al-Dulaimi	100 m freestyle	55.13	68	did not advance			
Ameer Ali	50 m butterfly	27.06	65	did not advance			
Ameer Ali	100 m butterfly	59.81	52	did not advance			
