= Iraq at the 2022 World Aquatics Championships =

- Flag of Iraq
- FINA code: IRQ
- National federation: Iraq Swimming Federation

in Budapest, Hungary
- Competitors: 2 in 1 sport
- Medals: Gold 0 Silver 0 Bronze 0 Total 0

World Aquatics Championships appearances
- 1998; 2001; 2003; 2005; 2007; 2009; 2011; 2013; 2015; 2017; 2019; 2022; 2023; 2024

Iraq competed at the 2022 World Aquatics Championships in Budapest, Hungary from 14 July to 30 July.

== Swimming ==
Iraq entered two swimmers.

Men

Athlete	Event	Heat		Semifinal		Final	
Athlete	Event	Time	Rank	Time	Rank	Time	Rank
Ahmed Al-Hasani	100 m freestyle	DNS		did not advance			
Ahmed Al-Hasani	100 m breaststroke	DNS		did not advance			
Hasan Al-Zinkee	50 m backstroke	DNS		did not advance			
Hasan Al-Zinkee	50 m butterfly	DNS		did not advance			
