= Turkmenistan at the 2019 World Aquatics Championships =

- Flag of Turkmenistan
- FINA code: TKM
- National federation: Turkmenistan Swimming Federation

World Aquatics Championships appearances
- 1994; 1998; 2001; 2003; 2005; 2007; 2009; 2011; 2013; 2015; 2017; 2019; 2022; 2023; 2024

Other related appearances
- Soviet Union (1973–1991)

Turkmenistan competed at the 2019 World Aquatics Championships in Gwangju, South Korea from 12 to 28 July.

== Swimming ==
Turkmenistan entered three swimmers.

Men

Athlete	Event	Heat		Semifinal		Final	
Athlete	Event	Time	Rank	Time	Rank	Time	Rank
Merdan Ataýew	50 m backstroke	25.84	35	did not advance			
Merdan Ataýew	100 m backstroke	55.34	32	did not advance			
Musa Zhalayev	50 m freestyle	24.71	88	did not advance			
Musa Zhalayev	100 m freestyle	54.14	91	did not advance			

Women

Athlete	Event	Heat		Semifinal		Final	
Athlete	Event	Time	Rank	Time	Rank	Time	Rank
Darya Semyonova	50 m breaststroke	35.33	43	did not advance			
Darya Semyonova	100 m breaststroke	1:16.73	47	did not advance			
