= Saint Kitts and Nevis at the 2023 World Aquatics Championships =

- Flag of Saint Kitts and Nevis
- FINA code: SKN
- National federation: St. Kitts and Nevis Swimming Federation

in Fukuoka, Japan
- Competitors: 1 in 1 sport
- Medals: Gold 0 Silver 0 Bronze 0 Total 0

World Aquatics Championships appearances
- 2019; 2022; 2023; 2024

Saint Kitts and Nevis is set to compete at the 2023 World Aquatics Championships in Fukuoka, Japan from 14 to 30 July.

== Swimming ==
Saint Kitts and Nevis entered 1 swimmer.

Women

Athlete	Event	Heat		Semifinal		Final	
Athlete	Event	Time	Rank	Time	Rank	Time	Rank
Jennifer Harding-Marlin	100 metre backstroke	1:12.19	58	Did not advance			
Jennifer Harding-Marlin	200 metre backstroke	2:37.83	41	Did not advance			
