= Anastasiya Shkurdai =

Belarusian swimmer (born 2003)

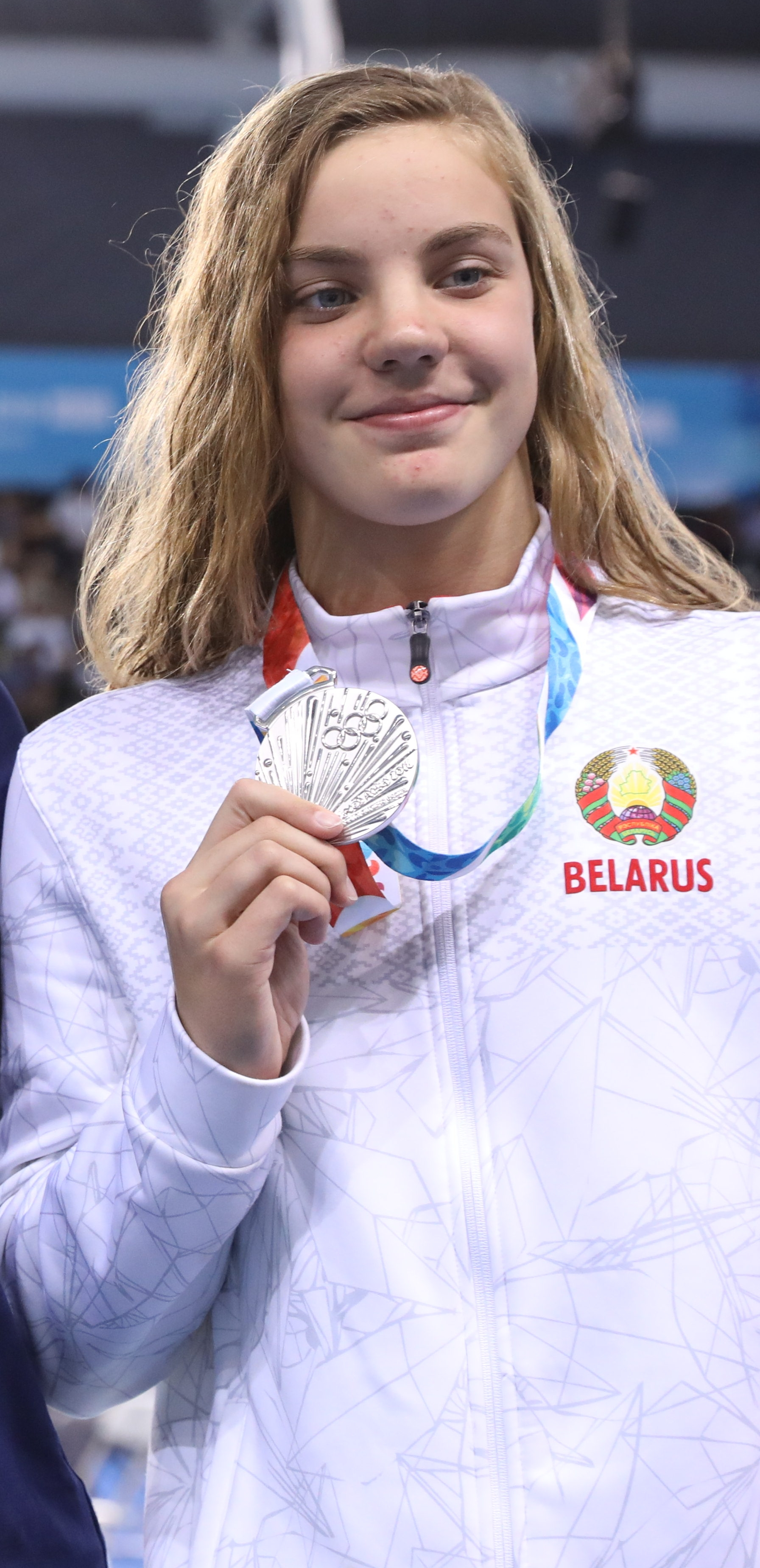
- Anastasiya Shkurdai in 2018

Personal information
- Nationality: (Belarus) Belarusian
- Born: 3 January 2003 (age 23) Brest, Belarus

Sport
- Country: Belarus
- Sport: Swimming
- Strokes: Backstroke
Medal record
Women's swimming
Representing Neutral Athletes A
World Championships (SC)
Bronze medal – third place	2024 Budapest	200 m backstroke
Representing Neutral Independent Athletes
World Championships (LC)
Bronze medal – third place	2024 Doha	200 m backstroke
Representing Belarus
European Championships (SC)
Gold medal – first place	2019 Glasgow	100 m butterfly
Silver medal – second place	2021 Kazan	100 m butterfly
Summer Youth Olympics
Silver medal – second place	2018 Buenos Aires	50 m butterfly
Bronze medal – third place	2018 Buenos Aires	100 m butterfly
World Junior Championships
Silver medal – second place	2019 Budapest	50 m butterfly
Silver medal – second place	2019 Budapest	100 m butterfly

Anastasiya Shkurdai (Belarusian: Анастасія Шкурдай, romanized: Anastasiya Shkurdai; born January 3, 2003) is a professional Belarusian swimmer. She won the bronze medal in the women's 200 metre backstroke event at the 2024 World Aquatics Championships held in Qatar. She won a gold medal at the 2019 European Short Course Swimming Championships held in Great Britain.

== Career ==
Shkurdai competed at the 2017 European Short Course Swimming Championships in Copenhagen, Denmark and the 2019 European Short Course Swimming Championships in Glasgow, Scotland.

In 2018, Shkurdai won the silver medal in the girls' 50 metre butterfly event and the bronze medal in the girls' 100 metre butterfly event at the Summer Youth Olympics held in Buenos Aires, Argentina. In the same year, she also competed in several events at the 2018 FINA World Swimming Championships (25 m) held in Hangzhou, China.

Shkurdai represented Belarus at the 2019 World Aquatics Championships in Gwangju, South Korea and she competed in the 4 × 100 metre mixed medley relay event.

In 2021, Shkurdai represented Belarus at the 2020 Summer Olympics held in Tokyo, Japan. She finished in 8th place in the final of the women's 100 metre butterfly event. She also competed in the women's 100 metre freestyle event and she did not start in the women's 100 metre backstroke event. She competed in two relays events: the women's 4 × 100 metre medley relay and mixed 4 × 100 metre medley relay.

She competed in the women's 50 metre, women's 100 metre and women's 200 metre backstroke events at the 2024 World Aquatics Championships held in Doha, Qatar. She won the bronze medal in the women's 200 metre backstroke event.
