= Saint Kitts and Nevis at the 2022 World Aquatics Championships =

- Flag of Saint Kitts and Nevis
- FINA code: SKN
- National federation: St. Kitts and Nevis Swimming Federation

in Budapest, Hungary
- Competitors: 1 in 1 sport
- Medals: Gold 0 Silver 0 Bronze 0 Total 0

World Aquatics Championships appearances
- 2019; 2022; 2023; 2024

Saint Kitts and Nevis competed at the 2022 World Aquatics Championships in Budapest, Hungary from 18 June to 3 July.

== Swimming ==
Swimmers from Saint Kitts and Nevis have achieved qualifying standards in the following events.

Athlete	Event	Heat		Semifinal		Final	
Athlete	Event	Time	Rank	Time	Rank	Time	Rank
Jennifer Harding-Marlin	Women's 50 m freestyle	31.80	75	did not advance			
Jennifer Harding-Marlin	Women's 100 m backstroke	1:16.28	42	did not advance			
