= Saint Kitts and Nevis at the 2024 World Aquatics Championships =

- Flag of Saint Kitts and Nevis
- FINA code: SKN
- National federation: St. Kitts and Nevis Swimming Federation

in Doha, Qatar
- Competitors: 2 in 1 sport
- Medals: Gold 0 Silver 0 Bronze 0 Total 0

World Aquatics Championships appearances
- 2019; 2022; 2023; 2024

Saint Kitts and Nevis competed at the 2024 World Aquatics Championships in Doha, Qatar from 2 to 18 February.

== Competitors ==
The following is the list of competitors in the Championships.

| Sport | Men | Women | Total |
|---|---|---|---|
| Swimming | 1 | 1 | 2 |
| Total | 1 | 1 | 2 |

== Swimming ==
Saint Kitts and Nevis entered 2 swimmers.

Men

| Athlete | Event | Heat | | Semifinal | | Final | |
| Athlete | Event | Time | Rank | Time | Rank | Time | Rank |
|---|---|---|---|---|---|---|---|
| Troy Nisbett | 50 metre freestyle | 29.23 | 111 | Did not advance | | | |
| Troy Nisbett | 100 metre freestyle | 1:05.84 | 106 | Did not advance | | | |

Women

| Athlete | Event | Heat | | Semifinal | | Final | |
| Athlete | Event | Time | Rank | Time | Rank | Time | Rank |
|---|---|---|---|---|---|---|---|
| Jennifer Harding-Marlin | 50 metre backstroke | 35.29 | 51 | Did not advance | | | |
| Jennifer Harding-Marlin | 100 metre backstroke | 1:14.93 | 55 | Did not advance | | | |
