= Saint Kitts and Nevis at the 2019 World Aquatics Championships =

- Flag of Saint Kitts and Nevis
- FINA code: SKN
- National federation: St. Kitts and Nevis Swimming Federation

in Gwangju, South Korea
- Competitors: 1 in 1 sport
- Medals: Gold 0 Silver 0 Bronze 0 Total 0

World Aquatics Championships appearances
- 2019; 2022; 2023; 2024

Saint Kitts and Nevis competed at the 2019 World Aquatics Championships in Gwangju, South Korea from 12 to 28 July.

== Swimming ==
Saint Kitts and Nevis entered one swimmer.

Women

Athlete	Event	Heat		Semifinal		Final	
Athlete	Event	Time	Rank	Time	Rank	Time	Rank
Jennifer Harding-Marlin	100 m freestyle	1:08.05	85	did not advance			
Jennifer Harding-Marlin	50 m backstroke	34.08	41	did not advance			
