= Peng Xuwei =

Chinese swimmer (born 2003)

Personal information
- Nationality: Chinese
- Born: 15 January 2003 (age 23) Macheng, Hubei, China
- Height: 1.79 m (5 ft 10 in)
- Weight: 70 kg (154 lb)

Sport
- Sport: Swimming
- Strokes: Backstroke
Medal record
Women's swimming
Representing China
Event	1st	2nd	3rd
World Championships (LC)	0	0	2
World Championships (SC)	0	0	1
Asian Games	4	0	1
Summer Youth Olympics	2	0	0
Total	6	0	4
Women's swimming
Representing China
World Championships (LC)
Bronze medal – third place	2023 Fukuoka	200 m backstroke
Bronze medal – third place	2025 Singapore	4×100 m medley
World Championships (SC)
Bronze medal – third place	2021 Abu Dhabi	4×100m medley
Pan Pacific Championships
Bronze medal – third place	2026 Irvine	200 m backstroke
Asian Games
Gold medal – first place	2022 Hangzhou	200 m backstroke
Gold medal – first place	2026 Aichi–Nagoya	100 m backstroke
Gold medal – first place	2026 Aichi–Nagoya	200 m backstroke
Gold medal – first place	2026 Aichi–Nagoya	4×100 m medley
Bronze medal – third place	2018 Jakarta	200 m backstroke
Summer Youth Olympics
Gold medal – first place	2018 Buenos Aires	4×100 m medley
Gold medal – first place	2018 Buenos Aires	4×100 m mixed medley

Peng Xuwei (Chinese: 彭旭玮, born 15 January 2003) is a Chinese swimmer and the reigning Asian Games champion in the women's 200 metre backstroke. She won a bronze medal in the event at the 2018 Asian Games before winning gold at the 2022 Asian Games. At the 2026 Asian Games, she successfully defended her title in an Asian record time of 2:05.77, becoming the first Asian woman to swim the event in under 2:06 and breaking the previous record of 2:06.46 set by Zhao Jing at the 2010 Asian Games.
