= 2024 World Aquatics Championships =

21st FINA World Championships

21st World Aquatics Championships
- Host city: Doha, Qatar
- Date: 2–18 February 2024
- Venue: 3
- Nations: 199
- Athletes: ~2,600
- Events: 75 in 6 sports
- Opened by: Tamim bin Hamad Al Thani
- Closed by: Husain Al-Musallam
- Website: worldaquatics-doha2024.com

The 2024 World Aquatics Championships, the 21st edition of the World Aquatics Championships, were held in Doha, Qatar, from 2 to 18 February 2024. Originally scheduled to be held in November 2023, the championships were postponed until February 2024 in response to the rescheduling of the 20th edition of the World Aquatics Championships in Fukuoka, Japan, from 2021 to 2022 due to the COVID-19 pandemic, and then again to 14 to 30 July 2023 due to travel restrictions and safety measures in place in Japan.

It was the first time the World Aquatics Championships was staged in the Middle East. Doha staged the World Aquatics Swimming Championships (25m) in 2014, and has also staged nine legs of the World Aquatics Swimming World Cup series between 2012 and 2021.

The tournament featured the largest number of athletes in comparison with previous events, in which more than 2,600 participants hailing from 201 countries, in addition to the World Aquatics Refugee team, competed in 75 medals events. However, the competition witnessed the notable absence of numerous top swimmers, with only six out of the 22 individual gold medalists from the 2023 World Aquatics Championships in Fukuoka taking part in the event in order to defend their last year's titles. A number of swimmers and member federations have expressed concerns regarding the timing of these championships, given they take place just five months before the 2024 Summer Olympics in Paris; in fact, this marks the first time (and the only) a long-course world championship has been held in an Olympic year.

== Host selection ==
On 9 June 2015, World Aquatics (then FINA) reported it had received expressions of interest for the 2021 and 2023 FINA World Championships from Argentina, Australia (Melbourne or Sydney), China (Wuhan or Nanjing), Germany (two potential cities), Japan, Turkey and Qatar.

On 30 June 2015, an information meeting was organised for the nations and cities which had shown interest in bidding. This meeting was attended by representatives of cities from six countries: Abu Dhabi (United Arab Emirates), Buenos Aires (Argentina), Istanbul (Turkey), Nanjing (China), Fukuoka (Japan), Doha (Qatar).

Bidding cities were then asked to present FINA with an executed Host City Agreement by 26 October 2015, and to make a formal presentation to the FINA Bureau on 8 November 2015. Australia and Germany were the first two countries to quit the bidding race and were followed by Argentina. Two others, Turkey and the United Arab Emirates, had also shown interest, but withdrew before the presentation stage.

With all other interested cities formerly withdrawing, on 2 October 2015, FINA executive director Cornel Marculescu confirmed there were three final bidders: Nanjing (China), Fukuoka (Japan), and Doha (Qatar).

On 31 January 2016, each of the bids were presented in a formal presentation at the FINA Bureau meeting in Budapest. After a vote, FINA announced Fukuoka as 2021 hosts and Doha as 2023 hosts.

In a press release issued on the same day, FINA President Julio Maglione stated: “Today we were presented three extraordinary bids fulfilling all requirements and having great facilities. Both winning cities, Fukuoka and Doha, are strong partners of FINA and will offer optimal conditions for the organisation of these Championships. There is a very strong commitment from the local authorities to welcome this event in their respective dynamic metropolis.”

Secretary General of Qatar Olympic Committee, Thani Al Kuwari, who led the Doha delegation, stated: “The FINA Family has been many times in Doha and everyone knows our true passion for organising top-events. Sport is an important tool for the development of our youth and of our country. Hosting the FINA World Championships for the first time in Middle East will be a great way to develop Aquatics on a global scale.”

== Venues ==
Three venues hosted competition at the Championships. The Aspire Dome, built for the 2006 Asian Games, hosted swimming and artistic swimming in a temporary pool constructed in the indoor football stadium, and water polo in a temporary pool constructed in the velodrome. Hamad Aquatic Centre, within the Aspire Academy, hosted diving competition and was also the host venue of the World Aquatics Swimming Championships (25m) in 2014. Open water swimming and high diving took place at Old Doha Port.

- Aspire Dome (swimming, artistic swimming, water polo)
- Hamad Aquatic Centre (diving)
- Old Doha Port (open water swimming, high diving)

== Symbols ==
=== Mascots ===
On 20 September 2023, the mascots were announced as: Nahim, a Qatari whale shark, and Mayfara, a coral.

The press release from World Aquatics stated: “Nahim and Mayfara are intimately tied to Qatar’s heritage and represent the inclusivity of the World Aquatics Championships and its commitment to promoting sustainability. The whale shark is the world’s biggest fish and commonly found in the safety of Qatari waters..”

== Schedule ==
A total of 75 medal events will be held across six disciplines.

●	Opening ceremony	●	Preliminaries	●	Finals	●	Closing ceremony	M	Men's matches	W	Women's matches

February	2	3	4	5	6	7	8	9	10	11	12	13	14	15	16	17	18	Total
Ceremonies			●														●	–
Swimming										4	4	5	5	5	5	6	8	42
Open water swimming		1	1			2	1											5
Artistic swimming	●	1	2	2	2	1	1	1	1									11
Diving	2	2	1	1	1	2	1	1	2									13
High diving												●	1	1				2
Water polo			W	M	W	M	W	M	W	M	W	M	W	M	W	M		2
Total	2	4	4	3	3	5	3	2	3	4	4	5	6	6	6	7	8	75
Cumulative Total	2	6	10	13	16	21	24	26	29	33	37	42	48	54	60	67	75	75

== Medal table ==
* Host nation (Qatar)

Rank	Nation	Gold	Silver	Bronze	Total
1	China	23	8	2	33
2	United States	9	6	8	23
3	Australia	7	12	5	24
4	Netherlands	5	4	0	9
5	France	4	5	9	18
5	Great Britain	4	5	9	18
7	Italy	3	10	6	19
8	Canada	2	3	6	11
9	South Korea	2	1	2	5
10	New Zealand	2	1	1	4
10	Sweden	2	1	1	4
12	Portugal	2	0	1	3
13	Ireland	2	0	0	2
14	Spain	1	5	4	10
15	Germany	1	2	3	6
16	Mexico	1	1	4	6
17	Hungary	1	1	2	4
17	Japan	1	1	2	4
17	Ukraine	1	1	2	4
20	Greece	1	1	1	3
20	Hong Kong	1	1	1	3
22	Lithuania	1	1	0	2
23	Croatia	1	0	0	1
23	Kazakhstan	1	0	0	1
25	North Korea	0	2	0	2
26	Austria	0	1	1	2
27	Denmark	0	1	0	1
27	Israel	0	1	0	1
27	Switzerland	0	1	0	1
30	Poland	0	0	3	3
31	Colombia	0	0	2	2
31	Egypt	0	0	2	2
31	Neutral Independent Athletes (Note: In accordance with sanctions imposed following by the 2022 Russian invasion of Ukraine, athletes from Belarus were not permitted to use the name, flag, or anthem of Belarus. They instead participated as "Neutral Independent Athletes (NIA)" and under the World Aquatics flag.)	0	0	2	2
34	Bosnia and Herzegovina	0	0	1	1
34	Brazil	0	0	1	1
34	Romania	0	0	1	1
34	South Africa	0	0	1	1
Totals (37 entries)		78	76	83	237

Source: Worldaquatics

== Participating National Federations ==
- Afghanistan (1)
- Albania (4)
- Algeria (3)
- American Samoa (1)
- Andorra (3)
- Angola (5)
- Antigua and Barbuda (4)
- Argentina (10)
- Armenia (7)
- Athlete Refugee Team (2)
- Aruba (5)
- Australia (78)
- Austria (16)
- Azerbaijan (1)
- Bahamas (4)
- Bahrain (4)
- Bangladesh (2)
- Barbados (2)
- Belgium (11)
- Benin (3)
- Bermuda (1)
- Bhutan (2)
- Bolivia (7)
- Bosnia and Herzegovina (3)
- Botswana (3)
- Brazil (64)
- Brunei (3)
- Bulgaria (10)
- Burkina Faso (2)
- Burundi (2)
- Cambodia (3)
- Cameroon (3)
- Canada (64)
- Cape Verde (2)
- Cayman Islands (3)
- Central African Republic (2)
- Chile (12)
- China (80)
- Chinese Taipei (10)
- Colombia (22)
- Comoros (2)
- Cook Islands (4)
- Costa Rica (12)
- Croatia (24)
- Cuba (11)
- Curaçao (3)
- Cyprus (3)
- Czech Republic (15)
- Democratic Republic of the Congo (2)
- Denmark (4)
- Djibouti (2)
- Dominica (1)
- Dominican Republic (11)
- Timor-Leste (2)
- Ecuador (5)
- Egypt (20)
- El Salvador (7)
- Eritrea (2)
- Estonia (2)
- Eswatini (2)
- Ethiopia (2)
- Faroe Islands (1)
- Federated States of Micronesia (4)
- Fiji (2)
- Finland (10)
- France (53)
- Gabon (2)
- The Gambia (2)
- Georgia (13)
- Germany (35)
- Ghana (3)
- Great Britain (52)
- Greece (64)
- Grenada (2)
- Guam (4)
- Guatemala (6)
- Guinea (5)
- Guinea-Bissau (1)
- Guyana (2)
- Haiti (2)
- Honduras (4)
- Hong Kong (20)
- Hungary (67)
- Iceland (1)
- India (14)
- Indonesia (14)
- Iran (2)
- Iraq (2)
- Ireland (16)
- Israel (16)
- Italy (94)
- Ivory Coast (2)
- Jamaica (6)
- Japan (50)
- Jordan (5)
- Kazakhstan (57)
- Kenya (5)
- Kosovo (2)
- Kuwait (5)
- Kyrgyzstan (2)
- Laos (3)
- Latvia (5)
- Lebanon (4)
- Lesotho (1)
- Libya (2)
- Liechtenstein (2)
- Lithuania (15)
- Luxembourg (3)
- Macau (17)
- Madagascar (2)
- Malawi (4)
- Malaysia (16)
- Maldives (4)
- Mali (3)
- Malta (3)
- Marshall Islands (2)
- Mauritania (1)
- Mauritius (4)
- Mexico (44)
- Moldova (3)
- Monaco (2)
- Mongolia (4)
- Montenegro (17)
- Morocco (5)
- Mozambique (4)
- Namibia (7)
- Nepal (4)
- Netherlands (41)
- Neutral Independent Athletes (5)
- New Zealand (33)
- Nicaragua (2)
- Niger (2)
- Nigeria (3)
- North Korea (5)
- North Macedonia (2)
- Northern Mariana Islands (2)
- Norway (7)
- Oman (2)
- Pakistan (2)
- Palau (4)
- Palestine (4)
- Panama (4)
- Papua New Guinea (3)
- Paraguay (3)
- Peru (9)
- Philippines (7)
- Poland (30)
- Portugal (15)
- Puerto Rico (12)
- Qatar (5) (host)
- Republic of the Congo (1)
- Romania (23)
- Rwanda (3)
- Saint Kitts and Nevis (2)
- Saint Lucia (4)
- Saint Vincent and the Grenadines (2)
- Samoa (3)
- San Marino (3)
- Saudi Arabia (3)
- Senegal (3)
- Serbia (30)
- Seychelles (7)
- Sierra Leone (2)
- Singapore (35)
- Sint Maarten (1)
- Slovakia (22)
- Slovenia (11)
- Solomon Islands (1)
- South Africa (60)
- South Korea (37)
- Spain (73)
- Sri Lanka (6)
- Sudan (4)
- Suriname (2)
- Sweden (18)
- Switzerland (13)
- Syria (3)
- Tajikistan (2)
- Tanzania (4)
- Thailand (19)
- Togo (2)
- Tonga (4)
- Trinidad and Tobago (2)
- Tunisia (3)
- Turkey (15)
- Turkmenistan (4)
- Turks and Caicos Islands (2)
- Uganda (6)
- Ukraine (28)
- United Arab Emirates (4)
- United States (95)
- Uruguay (7)
- Uzbekistan (6)
- Vanuatu (2)
- Venezuela (15)
- Vietnam (6)
- Virgin Islands (2)
- Yemen (2)
- Zambia (2)
- Zimbabwe (4)
