= Aleksandar Nikolov (swimmer) =

Bulgarian swimmer

Personal information
- Born: 18 June 1992 (age 34)

Sport
- Sport: Swimming

Aleksandar Nikolov (Bulgarian: Александър Николов, born 18 June 1992) is a Bulgarian swimmer. He competed in the men's 100 metre freestyle event at the 2016 Summer Olympics.
