= Ventsislav Aydarski =

Bulgarian swimmer (born 1991)

Personal information
- Born: February 17, 1991 (age 35) Sandanski, Bulgaria

Sport
- Sport: Swimming

Ventsislav Aydarski (Bulgarian: Венцислав Айдарски, born 17 February 1991) is a former Bulgarian swimmer. At the 2012 Summer Olympics, he competed in the Men's 1500 metre freestyle, finishing in 28th place overall in the heats, failing to qualify for the final. At the 2016 Summer Olympics, he raced in the 10 km open water marathon event, finishing in 15th place.

Aydarski began swimming at the age of seven, and retired in 2018.
