= Aynura Primova =

Turkmen swimmer (born 2006)

Aynura Primova (Turkmen: Aýnur Primowa; born 2 September 2006) is a Turkmen swimmer. Representing Turkmenistan at the 2024 Summer Olympics, she competed in the women's 100m backstroke, where she was ranked 35th overall.
