= Iraq at the 2011 World Aquatics Championships =

Sporting event delegation

Flag of Iraq

Iraq competed at the 2011 World Aquatics Championships in Shanghai, China between July 16 and 31, 2011.

== Swimming ==
Iraq qualified 2 swimmers.

Men

Athlete	Event	Heats		Semifinals		Final	
Athlete	Event	Time	Rank	Time	Rank	Time	Rank
Mohanad Al-Azzawi	Men's 50m Butterfly	27.51	42	did not advance			
Mohanad Al-Azzawi	Men's 100m Butterfly	1:01.10	59	did not advance			
Amer Ali	Men's 50m Butterfly	DSQ		did not advance			
Amer Ali	Men's 100m Butterfly	1:01.88	61	did not advance			
