= Flag of Curaçao =

Curaçao
- Use: Civil and state flag, state ensign
- Proportion: 2:3
- Adopted: 2 July 1984; 42 years ago
- Design: A blue field with a horizontal yellow stripe slightly below the midline and two white five-pointed stars in the canton.
- Use: Governor's standard
- Design: A white field with along the top and bottom three horizontal stripes red, white, and blue. Blue disk in the center with two white five-pointed stars and a yellow stripe.

The national flag of Curaçao represents the country of Curaçao. It also represented the island area within the Netherlands Antilles from 1984 until its dissolution in 2010.

The flag is a blue field with a horizontal yellow stripe slightly below the midline and two white, five-pointed stars in the canton. The blue symbolises the sea and sky (the bottom and top blue sections, respectively), divided by a yellow stroke representing the bright sun which bathes the island. The two stars represent Curaçao and Klein Curaçao, with the five points on each star symbolising the five continents from which Curaçao's people descend.

After Aruba's adoption of its own flag (while still part of the Netherlands Antilles), Curaçao received approval for a flag in 1979. Two thousand designs were submitted to a special council; ten were shortlisted, and the council decided on 29 November 1982. With some modifications, the flag was adopted on 2 July 1984.

== Design ==
The horizontal stripes have a ratio of 5:1:2 (blue:yellow:blue). The stars have diameters 1/6 and 2/9 of the flag height. The centre of the smaller one is 1/6 the flag height from the left and top edges, and the centre of the larger is 1/3 from the left and top edges. The blue is Pantone 280, and the yellow, Pantone 102.

=== Colors ===
| Colors scheme | Blue | Yellow | White |
|---|---|---|---|
| Pantone | 280 | 102 | |
| CMYK | 100-66-0-50 | 0-7-92-2 | 0-0-0-0 |
| HEX | #002B7F | #F9E814 | #FFFFFF |
| RGB | 0-43-127 | 249-232-20 | 255-255-255 |

== Gallery ==
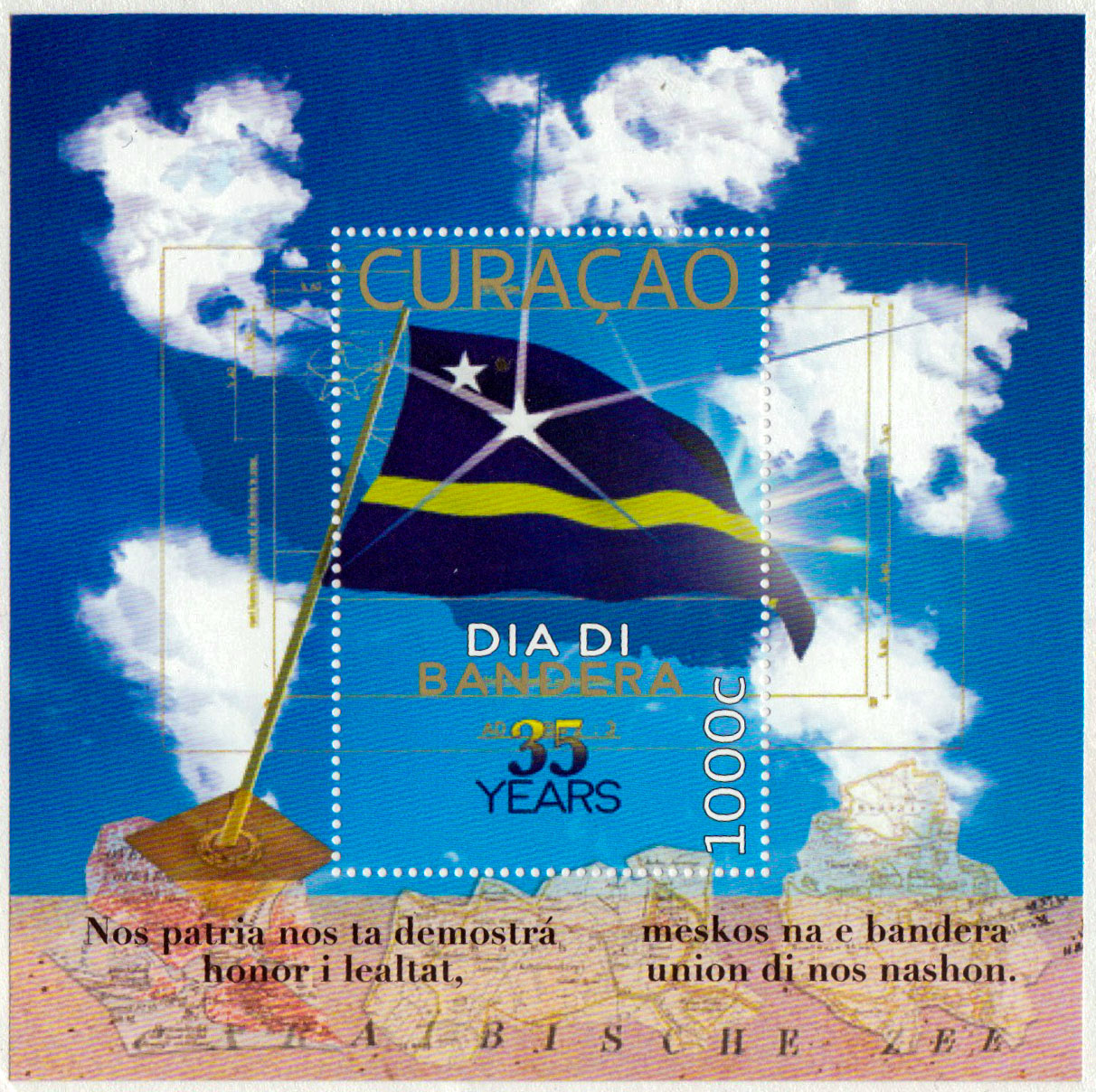
Stamp commemorating the national flag

Flag of Curaçao before modification (1982–1984)

== See also ==
- Flag of the Netherlands Antilles
- Flag of the Netherlands
