= Turkmenistan at the 2011 World Aquatics Championships =

Sporting event delegation

Flag of Turkmenistan

Turkmenistan competed at the 2011 World Aquatics Championships in Shanghai, China between July 16 and 31, 2011.

== Swimming ==
Turkmenistan qualified 3 swimmers.

Men

Athlete	Event	Heats		Semifinals		Final	
Athlete	Event	Time	Rank	Time	Rank	Time	Rank
Sergey Krovyakov	Men's 50m Freestyle	25.11	65	did not advance			
Sergey Krovyakov	Men's 100m Freestyle	55.99	77	did not advance			
Andrey Molchanov	Men's 100m Backstroke	1:05.39	50	did not advance			
Andrey Molchanov	Men's 100m Butterfly	1:00.83	58	did not advance			

Women

Athlete	Event	Heats		Semifinals		Final	
Athlete	Event	Time	Rank	Time	Rank	Time	Rank
Jennet Saryyeva	Women's 200m Freestyle	2:41.27	49	did not advance			
Jennet Saryyeva	Women's 400m Freestyle	5:41.09	37			did not advance	
