= Bulgaria at the 2011 World Aquatics Championships =

Sporting event delegation

Flag of Bulgaria

Bulgaria competed at the 2011 World Aquatics Championships in Shanghai, China between July 16 and 31, 2011.

== Medalists ==
| Medal | Name | Sport | Event | Date |
|---|---|---|---|---|
| Gold | Petar Stoychev | Open Water Swimming | Men's 25km | 23 July |

== Open water swimming ==
Men

| Athlete | Event | Final | |
| Athlete | Event | Time | Position |
|---|---|---|---|
| Petar Stoychev | Men's 10km | 1:55:39.5 | 27 |
| Petar Stoychev | Men's 25km | 5:10:39.8 | Gold medal |

== Swimming ==
Bulgaria qualified 3 swimmers.

Men

| Athlete | Event | Heats | | Semifinals | | Final | |
| Athlete | Event | Time | Rank | Time | Rank | Time | Rank |
|---|---|---|---|---|---|---|---|
| Ventsislav Aydarski | Men's 800m Freestyle | 8:13.07 | 35 | | | did not advance | |
| Ventsislav Aydarski | Men's 1500m Freestyle | 15:46.33 | 23 | | | did not advance | |

Women

| Athlete | Event | Heats | | Semifinals | | Final | |
| Athlete | Event | Time | Rank | Time | Rank | Time | Rank |
|---|---|---|---|---|---|---|---|
| Nina Rangelova | Women's 100m Freestyle | 55.81 | 32 | did not advance | | | |
| Nina Rangelova | Women's 200m Freestyle | 1:59.30 | 22 | did not advance | | | |
| Nina Rangelova | Women's 400m Freestyle | 4:12.38 | 19 | | | did not advance | |
| Ekaterina Avramova | Women's 50m Backstroke | 28.66 | 13 Q | 28.64 | 12 | did not advance | |
| Ekaterina Avramova | Women's 100m Backstroke | 1:01.39 | 16 Q | 1:01.10 | 15 | did not advance | |
| Ekaterina Avramova | Women's 200m Backstroke | 2:14.85 | 27 | did not advance | | | |

== Synchronised swimming ==
Bulgaria has qualified 2 athletes in synchronised swimming.

Women

| Athlete | Event | Preliminary | | Final | |
| Athlete | Event | Points | Rank | Points | Rank |
|---|---|---|---|---|---|
| Kalina Yordanova | Solo Technical Routine | 77.000 | 19 | did not advance | |
| Kalina Yordanova | Solo Free Routine | 76.210 | 19 | did not advance | |
| Iglika Goleminova; Kalina Yordanova | Duet Technical Routine | 74.400 | 30 | did not advance | |
| Iglika Goleminova; Kalina Yordanova | Duet Free Routine | 76.650 | 28 | did not advance | |
