= Gabriela Georgieva =

Bulgarian swimmer (born 1997)

Personal information
- Born: 16 June 1997 (age 29) Sofia, Bulgaria

Sport
- Sport: Swimming

Gabriela Georgieva (Bulgarian: Габриела Георгиева, born 16 June 1997) is a Bulgarian swimmer. She competed in the women's 50 metre backstroke event at the 2017 World Aquatics Championships.She competed in the final event in 200m backstroke at the 2024 World Aquatics Championships.
