= Flag of Bulgaria =

Republic of Bulgaria
- Use: Civil and state flag, civil ensign
- Proportion: 3:5
- Adopted: 1879 (first adoption); 27 November 1990 (readoption)
- Design: A horizontal tricolour of white, green and red.
- Designed by: Stiliana Parashkevova (original version)
- Use: Flag using official specifications for internet use
- Proportion: 3:5
- Design: A horizontal tricolour of white, green and red.

The national flag of the Republic of Bulgaria is a tricolour consisting of three equal-sized horizontal bands of (from top to bottom) white, green, and red. The flag was first adopted after the 1877–1878 Russo-Turkish War, when Bulgaria gained de facto independence. The national flag at times had as a supplement the state emblem, especially during the communist era. The current flag was re-established with the 1991 Constitution of Bulgaria and was confirmed in a 1998 law.

== Historical flags ==
=== First Bulgarian Empire ===
In 866, Pope Nicholas I advised Prince Boris who had recently Christianised his people to switch from the practice of using a horse tail as a banner to adopting the Holy Cross.

Later illuminated versions of the chronicles of John Skylitzes and Constantine Manasses depict the army of Khan Krum carrying flags either in monotone red, or red with a black border. The army of Simeon the Great is also depicted carrying red banners of varying shape. The Radziwiłł Chronicle also depicts Tzar Simeon I's army under a red flag in the 921–922 campaign against Byzantium, but the depiction of the Hungarian invasion of 894 featured the Bulgarian fortress of Drastar under a white flag with a crescent and a six-pointed star. Any pictorial representations of flags in the manuscripts mentioned above, regardless of the faction or time depicted, conform strongly to the overall illustration style used in each manuscript. In addition, none of those manuscripts dates to the time of the First Bulgarian Empire. The historicity of those flags is thus impossible to verify.

=== Second Bulgarian Empire ===
Depictions of Bulgarian flags can be seen on various portolan maps from the 14th and 15th centuries. On those maps, the flags commonly have a white or golden background and depict either the insignia of the ruling House of Shishman, or unknown symbols in red. Those drawings are markedly more diverse than the flags of the neighbouring countries such as the Eastern Roman Empire, the Golden Horde or the Serbian Empire, which in the same maps are largely consistent.

=== Third Bulgarian state ===
After the liberation of Bulgaria following the Russo-Turkish War in 1878, the flag was described in the Tarnovo Constitution of 1879 as follows:

Art. 23. The Bulgarian people's flag is three-coloured and consists of white, green and red colours, placed horizontally.

After the establishment of the People's Republic of Bulgaria in 1946, the new Dimitrov Constitution of 1947 changed the flag: the colors and their order remained the same, but the new national emblem was placed on the left side of the white stripe. The new emblem contained a lion within a wreath of wheat ears below a red star and above a ribbon bearing the date 9.IХ.1944 (9 September 1944), the day of the coup d'état of 1944 which had ended the monarchy. In 1971, the emblem (and thus the flag) was slightly modified - the ribbon was parted in two, bearing the years 681 and 1944, the former being the year of the establishment of the First Bulgarian Empire.

After the fall of Communism in 1990, the then-enforced Zhivkov Constitution was amended so the flag could be reverted to the pre-Communist era. The new Constitution of Bulgaria, adopted in 1991, describes the Bulgarian flag as follows:

Art. 166. The flag of the Republic of Bulgaria shall be a tricolour: white, green and red from top, placed horizontally.

A popular version of the flag, which has no official status, is also commonly known. It has the full coat of arms on the left of the flag, placed across the white and green fields only.

== Flag law ==
According to the Law for the State Seal and National Flag of the Republic of Bulgaria, promulgated on 24 April 1998:

Art. 15. (1) The national flag of the Republic of Bulgaria is a national symbol which expresses the independence and sovereignty of the Bulgarian state.

(2) The national flag of the Republic of Bulgaria is tricolour: white, green and red fields, placed horizontally from the top downwards. On fixing the national flag in a vertical situation of the carrying body the colours shall be arranged from left to right - white, green, red.

(3) The national flag is of a rectangular shape. The fields of the individual colours shall be equal in size and shall be situated along the horizontal of the rectangular.

== Colours ==
Appendix 2 to the Law for the State Seal and National Flag of the Republic of Bulgaria specifies colours when the flag is sewn from textiles or printed on paper.

The law does not specify what colour values should be used in digital renderings of the flag but the website of the Bulgarian civil service recommends specific RGB values for electronic applications and legacy web-safe values for websites.

Flag colours
Proportions and colours of the flag in Pantone
	White	Green (Digital)	Red (Digital)	Green (Textile)	Red (Textile)
Pantone textile	Whiteness greater than 80%			17-5936 TCX	18-1664 TCX
Pantone	Whiteness greater than 80%	347 U	032 U		
RGB	Red = 255; Green = 255; Blue = 255; Hex = #FFFFFF	Red = 0 Green = 128; Blue = 0 Hex = #009900	Red = 200; Green = 0 Blue = 0 Hex = #CC0000	Red = 0 Green = 150; Blue = 110; Hex = #00966E	Red = 214; Green = 38; Blue = 18; Hex = #D62612
CMYK	Cyan = 0% Magenta = 0% Yellow = 0% Black = 0%	Cyan = 100% Magenta = 0% Yellow = 100% Black = 0%	Cyan = 0% Magenta = 100% Yellow = 100% Black = 0%	Cyan = 100% Magenta = 0% Yellow = 26.67% Black = 41.18%	Cyan = 0% Magenta = 82.24% Yellow = 91.59% Black = 16.18%

== Gallery ==
=== Flags of the Second Bulgarian Empire ===
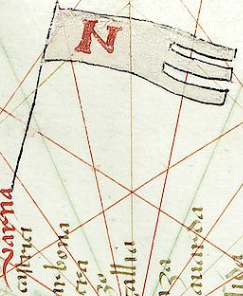
Flag of Bulgaria on Pietro Vesconte's 1321 nautical chart

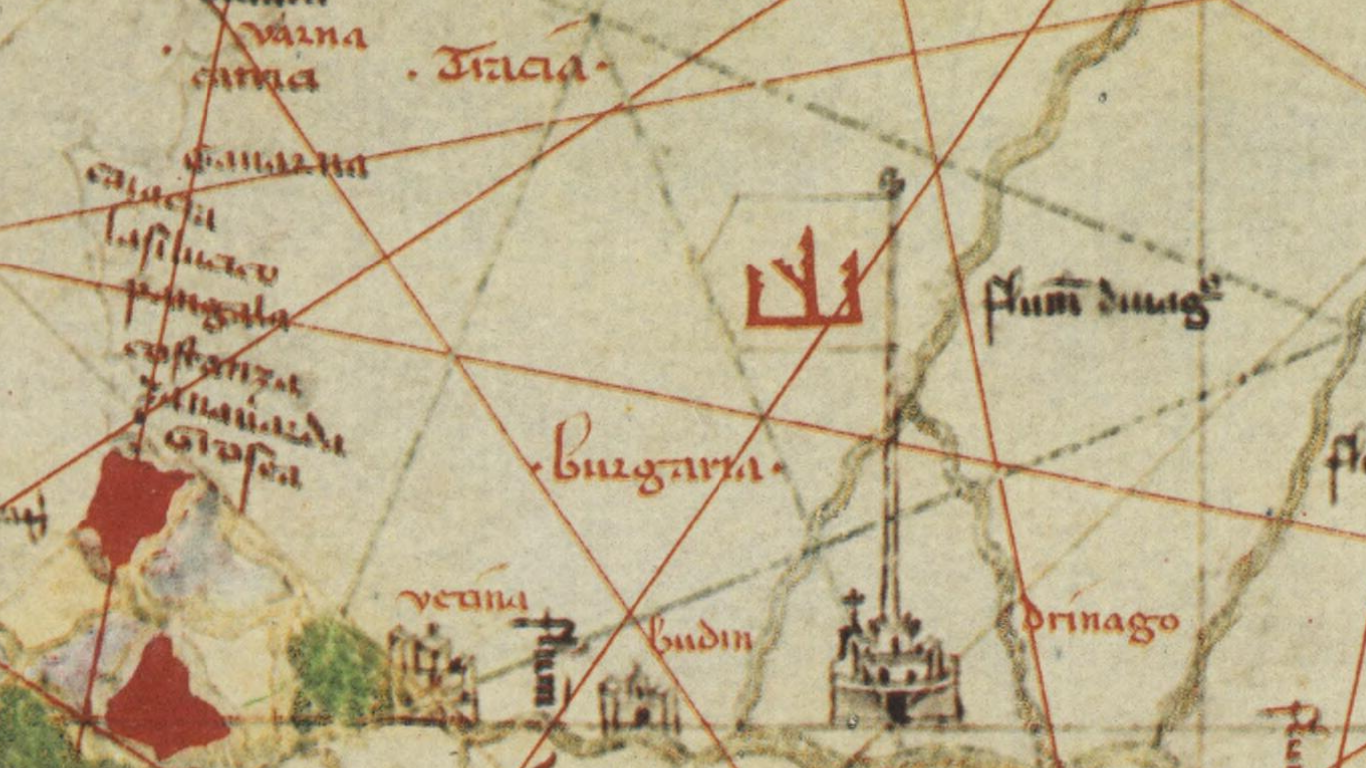
Flag of the Shishman dynasty west of Vidin on a map (dated 1325–1340) by Angelino Dalorto

Approximate replica of Dalorto's portolan chart

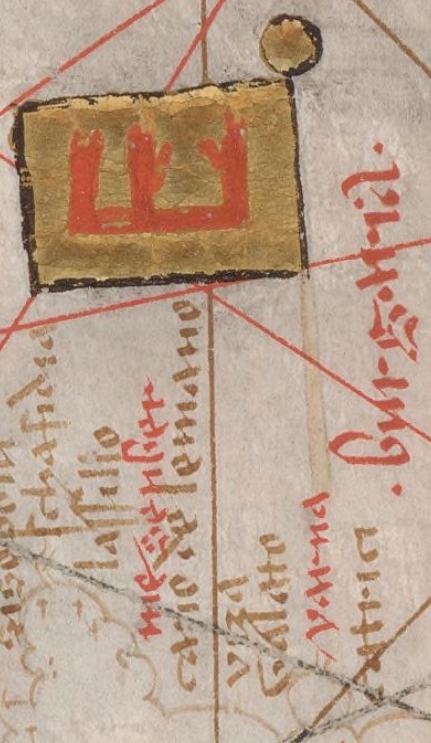
Flag over Varna on Guillem Soler's Portolan chart (c.1385)

Approximate replica of Soler's portolan chart

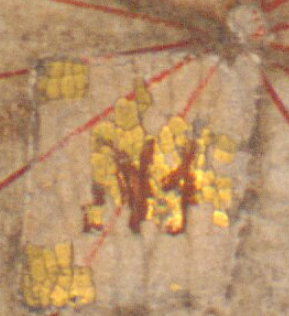
Flag of Bulgaria on Battista Beccario's 1426 map

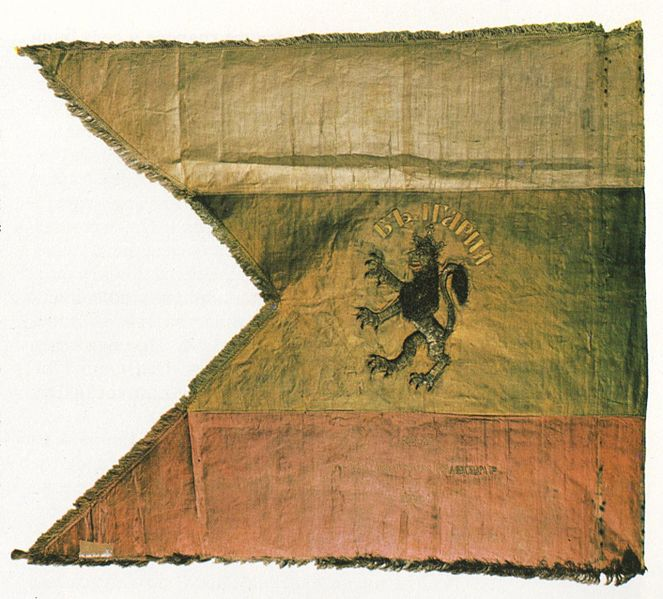
Flag of the Bulgarian Volunteer Corps in the Russo-Turkish War (1877–1878)

=== Flags of the modern Bulgarian state ===
Flag of Bulgaria (1879–1947, 1990–present). Valid as of 27 November 1990.

Sideways flag of Bulgaria. Valid as of 27 November 1990.

Flag of Bulgaria (1947–1948)

Flag of Bulgaria (1948–1967). Valid as of 27 January 1948.

Flag of Bulgaria (1967–1971). The design of the emblem has changed slightly from the previous version. Valid as of 5 January 1967.

Flag of Bulgaria (1971–1990). The indication of 681, the year of the establishment of the First Bulgarian Empire by Asparukh, was added to 1944. Hoisted for the first time on 21 May 1971.

Flag of the Bulgarian ethnic minority in SFR Yugoslavia.
Bulgarian People's Army war flag from the Communist era. The motto in Bulgarian means "For our Socialist motherland".

Current Bulgarian war flag, similar to Bulgarian war flags from period 1880s–mid 1940s. The motto in Bulgarian means "God is with us".

Naval ensign of Bulgaria

Naval jack of Bulgaria
Flag for the Bulgarian Ministry of War (1912–1944)

Naval ensign of Bulgaria (1879–1949)

Naval ensign of Bulgaria (1949–1955)

Naval ensign of Bulgaria (1955–1991)

Naval ensign of Bulgaria (1991–2005)

Standard of the Tsar (approx. 1937–1946)

== See also ==
- List of Bulgarian flags
- Coat of arms of Bulgaria
- Mila Rodino
- National Guards Unit of Bulgaria
