= Mauritius at the 2025 World Aquatics Championships =

- Flag of Mauritius
- World Aquatics code: MRI
- National federation: Fédération Mauricienne de Natation

in Singapore
- Competitors: 4 in 2 sports
- Medals: Gold 0 Silver 0 Bronze 0 Total 0

World Aquatics Championships appearances
- 1973; 1975; 1978; 1982; 1986; 1991; 1994; 1998; 2001; 2003; 2005; 2007; 2009; 2011; 2013; 2015; 2017; 2019; 2022; 2023; 2024; 2025

Mauritius is competing at the 2025 World Aquatics Championships in Singapore from 11 July to 3 August 2025.

== Competitors ==
The following is the list of competitors in the Championships.

Sport	Men	Women	Total
Open water swimming	0	1	1
Swimming	1	2	3
Total	1	3	4

== Open water swimming ==
Women

Athlete	Event	Final	
Athlete	Event	Time	Rank
Micheline Bathfield	5 km	OTL	
Micheline Bathfield	10 km	DNF	

== Swimming ==
Men

Athlete	Event	Heat		Semifinal		Final	
Athlete	Event	Time	Rank	Time	Rank	Time	Rank
Victor Ah Yong	100 m butterfly	55.76 NR	56	Did not advance			
Victor Ah Yong	200 m butterfly	2:07.95	33	Did not advance			

Women

Athlete	Event	Heat		Semifinal		Final	
Athlete	Event	Time	Rank	Time	Rank	Time	Rank
Alicia Kok Shun	50 m freestyle	27.35	55	Did not advance			
Alicia Kok Shun	50 m breaststroke	34.40	44	Did not advance			
Anishta Teeluck	100 m backstroke	1:05.20	43	Did not advance			
Anishta Teeluck	200 m backstroke	2:18.88	34	Did not advance			
