= Madagascar at the 2025 World Aquatics Championships =

- Flag of Madagascar
- World Aquatics code: MAD
- National federation: Fédération Malgache de Natation

in Singapore
- Competitors: 4 in 1 sport
- Medals: Gold 0 Silver 0 Bronze 0 Total 0

World Aquatics Championships appearances
- 1973; 1975; 1978; 1982; 1986; 1991; 1994; 1998; 2001; 2003; 2005; 2007; 2009; 2011; 2013; 2015; 2017; 2019; 2022; 2023; 2024; 2025

Madagascar is competing at the 2025 World Aquatics Championships in Singapore from 11 July to 3 August 2025.

== Competitors ==
The following is the list of competitors in the Championships.

Sport	Men	Women	Total
Swimming	2	2	4
Total	2	2	4

== Swimming ==
Men

Athlete	Event	Heat		Semifinal		Final	
Athlete	Event	Time	Rank	Time	Rank	Time	Rank
Francky Ramiakatrarivo	50 m freestyle	24.80	83	Did not advance			
Jonathan Raharvel	50 m breaststroke	29.25	61	Did not advance			
Jonathan Raharvel	200 m breaststroke	2:25.59	36	Did not advance			
Francky Ramiakatrarivo	50 m butterfly	26.56	79	Did not advance			

Women

Athlete	Event	Heat		Semifinal		Final	
Athlete	Event	Time	Rank	Time	Rank	Time	Rank
Antsa Rabejaona	50 m backstroke	30.78	46	Did not advance			
Antsa Rabejaona	50 m butterfly	29.31	58	Did not advance			
Ony Andrianaivo	100 m butterfly	1:13.31	56	Did not advance			
Ony Andrianaivo	200 m butterfly	2:59.22	27	Did not advance			

Mixed

Athlete	Event	Heat		Final	
Athlete	Event	Time	Rank	Time	Rank
Ony Andrianaivo; Antsa Rabejaona; Jonathan Raharvel; Francky Ramiakatrarivo	4 × 100 m medley relay	4:26.77	32	Did not advance	
