= List of Mauritian records in swimming =

The Mauritian records in swimming are the fastest ever performances of swimmers from Mauritius, which are recognised and ratified by the Federation Mauricienne De Natation.

All records were set in finals unless noted otherwise.

== Long Course (50 m) ==
=== Men ===
Event	Time		Name	Club	Date	Meet	Location	Ref
50 m freestyle	22.30		Bradley Vincent	Mauritius	9 May 2026	African Championships	Oran, Algeria	
100 m freestyle	49.93	h	Bradley Vincent	Mauritius	7 April 2018	Commonwealth Games	Gold Coast, Australia	
200 m freestyle	1:53.18	h	Mathieu Marquet	Mauritius	24 July 2017	World Championships	Budapest, Hungary	
400 m freestyle	4:07.28	h	Mathieu Marquet	Mauritius	23 July 2017	World Championships	Budapest, Hungary	
800 m freestyle	8:38.52	h, ✝	Timothy Leberl	Mauritius	29 July 2023	World Championships	Fukuoka, Japan	
1500 m freestyle	16:27.67	h	Timothy Leberl	Mauritius	29 July 2023	World Championships	Fukuoka, Japan	
50 m backstroke	27.00	h	Bradley Vincent	Mauritius	10 September 2018	African Championships	Algiers, Algeria	
100 m backstroke	58.78		Bradley Vincent	Mauritius	14 September 2018	African Championships	Algiers, Algeria	
200 m backstroke	2:13.06	h	Mathieu Marquet	Mauritius	12 September 2018	African Championships	Algiers, Algeria	
50 m breaststroke	28.89	h	Hans Li Ying Pin	Mauritius	26 July 2026	Commonwealth Games	Glasgow, United Kingdom	
100 m breaststroke	1:04.37	h	Hans Li Ying Pin	Mauritius	24 July 2026	Commonwealth Games	Glasgow, United Kingdom	
200 m breaststroke	2:20.47		Jonathan Chung Yee	SG HT16 Hamburg	1 April 2023	Nord Test	Hamburg, Germany	
50 m butterfly	24.23	h	Bradley Vincent	Mauritius	6 May 2026	African Championships	Oran, Algeria	
100 m butterfly	55.76	h	Victor Ah Yong	Mauritius	1 August 2025	World Championships	Singapore, Singapore	
200 m butterfly	2:07.78		Victor Ah Yong	Mauritius	23 July 2019	Indian Ocean Island Games	Côte d'Or, Mauritius	
200m individual medley	2:10.83	h	Mathieu Marquet	Mauritius	15 September 2018	African Championships	Algiers, Algeria	
400m individual medley	4:47.78		Mathieu Marquet	Mauritius	11 September 2018	African Championships	Algiers, Algeria	
4×100m freestyle relay	3:34.50		Simon Bachmann; Amos Ferley; Adam Moncherry; Nathan Nagapin	Mauritius	26 August 2023	Indian Ocean Island Games	Antananarivo, Madagascar	
4×200m freestyle relay	8:17.15			Mauritius	29 August 2023	Indian Ocean Island Games	Antananarivo, Madagascar	
4×100m medley relay	3:54.69		Victor Ah Yong; Kushen Govinden; Hans Li Ying Pin; Ovesh Purahoo	Mauritius	28 August 2023	Indian Ocean Island Games	Antananarivo, Madagascar	

Legend: # – Record awaiting ratification by Federation Mauricienne De Natation; WR – World record; AF – African record;
Records not set in finals: h – heat; sf – semifinal; r – relay 1st leg; rh – relay heat 1st leg; b – B final; † – en route to final mark; so – swim-off; tt – time trial

=== Women ===
Event	Time		Name	Club	Date	Meet	Location	Ref
50 m freestyle	26.99	h	Olivia Plateau de Maroussen	Mauritius	25 July 2014	Commonwealth Games	Glasgow, United Kingdom	
100 m freestyle	58.73	h	Heather Arseth	Mauritius	1 August 2013	World Championships	Barcelona, Spain	
200 m freestyle	2:07.98	h	Olivia Plateau de Maroussen	Mauritius	24 July 2014	Commonwealth Games	Glasgow, United Kingdom	
400 m freestyle	4:33.41		Anishta Teeluck	Mauritius	7 May 2026	African Championships	Oran, Algeria	
800 m freestyle	9:49.27		Layne Lim Ah Tock					
1500 m freestyle	19:30.53		Gabrielle Bathfield	Mauritius	6 December 2023	African Junior Championships	Mauritius, Mauritius	
50 m backstroke	30.61	h	Heather Arseth	Mauritius	31 July 2013	World Championships	Barcelona, Spain	
100 m backstroke	1:04.25	b	Anishta Teeluck	Aquamore Acqua13	13 April 2024	Eindhoven Qualification Meet	Eindhoven, Netherlands	
200 m backstroke	2:17.71		Anishta Teeluck	Mauritius	10 March 2024	African Games	Accra, Ghana	
50 m breaststroke	32.50	h	Alicia Kok Shun	Mauritius	27 July 2026	Commonwealth Games	Glasgow, United Kingdom	
100 m breaststroke	1:12.80		Ruth Ip Hen Cheung	Mauritius	27 August 2023	Indian Ocean Island Games	Antananarivo, Madagascar	
200 m breaststroke	2:43.83		Alicia Kok Shun	Mauritius	7 April 2024	Thailand Age Group Championships	Samut Prakan, Thailand	
50 m butterfly	28.31	h	Heather Arseth	Mauritius	7 September 2015	African Games	Brazzaville, Congo	
100 m butterfly	1:03.68	h	Elodie Poo-cheong	Mauritius	23 July 2017	World Championships	Budapest, Hungary	
200 m butterfly	2:30.70		Micheline Bathfield	Mauritius	29 August 2023	Indian Ocean Island Games	Antananarivo, Madagascar	
200 m individual medley	2:35.39	h	Ruth Ip Hen Cheung	Mauritius	10 September 2015	African Games	Brazzaville, Congo	
400 m individual medley	5:29.66		Alysson Yene	Mauritius	6 December 2023	African Junior Championships	Mauritius, Mauritius	
4×100 m freestyle relay	4:09.08		Anishta Teeluck; Micheline Bathfield; Ruth Ip Hen Cheung	Mauritius	26 August 2023	Indian Ocean Island Games	Antananarivo, Madagascar	
4×200 m freestyle relay	9:10.58			Mauritius	29 August 2023	Indian Ocean Island Games	Antananarivo, Madagascar	
4×100 m medley relay	3:52.26			Mauritius	23 July 2019	Indian Ocean Island Games	Côte d'Or, Mauritius	

Legend: # – Record awaiting ratification by Federation Mauricienne De Natation; WR – World record; AF – African record;
Records not set in finals: h – heat; sf – semifinal; r – relay 1st leg; rh – relay heat 1st leg; b – B final; † – en route to final mark; so – swim-off; tt – time trial

=== Mixed relay ===
Event	Time	Name	Club	Date	Meet	Location	Ref
4×100 m freestyle relay	3:44.80		Mauritius	27 August 2023	Indian Ocean Island Games	Antananarivo, Madagascar	
4×100 m medley relay	4:07.72		Mauritius	30 August 2023	Indian Ocean Island Games	Antananarivo, Madagascar	

Legend: # – Record awaiting ratification by Federation Mauricienne De Natation; WR – World record; AF – African record;
Records not set in finals: h – heat; so – swim-off

== Short Course (25 m) ==
=== Men ===
Event	Time		Name	Club	Date	Meet	Location	Ref
50m freestyle	21.96		Bradley Vincent	Mauritius	2 November 2018	World Cup	Beijing, China	
100m freestyle	48.06		Bradley Vincent	Mauritius	3 November 2018	World Cup	Beijing, China	
200m freestyle	1:50.19	h	Mathieu Marquet	Mauritius	12 December 2018	World Championships	Hangzhou, China	
400m freestyle	3:57.99	h	Mathieu Marquet	Mauritius	2 November 2018	World Cup	Beijing, China	
800m freestyle	8:24.20	†	Timothy Leberl	Mauritius	10 December 2024	World Championships	Budapest, Hungary	
1500m freestyle	15:55.08		Timothy Leberl	Mauritius	10 December 2024	World Championships	Budapest, Hungary	
50m backstroke	26.02	rh	Bradley Vincent	Mauritius	13 December 2018	World Championships	Hangzhou, China	
100m backstroke	1:00.03	h	Gael Adam	Mauritius	9 April 2008	World Championships	Manchester, Great Britain	
200m backstroke	2:06.89	h	Gael Adam	Mauritius	13 April 2008	Short Course Worlds	Manchester, Great Britain	
50m breaststroke	29.20	h	Darren Can Chin Wah	Mauritius	10 December 2016	World Championships	Windsor, Canada	
100m breaststroke	1:02.72	h	Jonathan Chung yee	Mauritius	21 October 2022	World Cup	Berlin, Germany	
200m breaststroke	2:15.36		Jonathan Chung Yee	HT16 Hamburg	4 February 2023	North German Teams Championships	Hannover, Germany	
50m butterfly	24.69		Bradley Vincent	Camo Beau Bassin	13 December 2025	MSF Summer Championships	Beau Bassin-Rose Hill, Mauritius	
100m butterfly	56.23		Mathieu Marquet	CAMO	28 December 2015	Indian Ocean Meet	Saint-Paul, Réunion	
200m butterfly	2:05.27		Victor Ah Yong	CAMO	24 October 2020	Grand Prix	Quatre Bornes, Mauritius	
100m individual medley	1:00.16	h	Mathieu Marquet	Mauritius	8 December 2016	World Championships	Windsor, Canada	
200m individual medley	2:05.71	h	Mathieu Marquet	Mauritius	3 November 2018	World Cup	Beijing, China	
400m individual medley	4:33.24	h	Mathieu Marquet	Mauritius	15 December 2018	World Championships	Hangzhou, China	
4×50m freestyle relay	1:33.99		Mathieu Marquet; Olivier Ah Ching; Hau Kim Fong; Bradley Vincent	CAMO	28 December 2015	Indian Ocean Meet	Saint-Paul, Réunion	
4×100m freestyle relay	3:49.97		Sebastien Rene (58.00); Jean-Didier Rousselin (56.83); Mathieu Anodin (56.88); Gregory Anodin (58.26)	CNQB	28 December 2014	Indian Ocean Meet	Saint-Paul, Réunion	
4×200m freestyle relay								
4×50m medley relay	1:46.41		Bradley Vincent; Olivier Ah Ching; Hau Kim Fong; Mathieu Marquet	CAMO	29 December 2015	Indian Ocean Meet	Saint-Paul, Réunion	
4×100m medley relay								

Legend: # – Record awaiting ratification by Federation Mauricienne De Natation; WR – World record; AF – African record;
Records not set in finals: h – heat; sf – semifinal; r – relay 1st leg; rh – relay heat 1st leg; b – B final; † – en route to final mark; so – swim-off; tt – time trial

=== Women ===
Event	Time		Name	Club	Date	Meet	Location	Ref
50 m freestyle	26.39	h	Olivia de Maroussem	Mauritius	6 December 2014	World Championships	Doha, Qatar	
100 m freestyle	57.41	h	Olivia de Maroussem	Mauritius	4 December 2014	World Championships	Doha, Qatar	
200 m freestyle	2:06.47		Anishta Teeluck	Ile Maurice	12 October 2025	International Meeting of Saint-Dizier	Saint-Dizier, France	
400 m freestyle	4:34.95	h	Elodie Poo-cheong	CAMO	29 December 2013	Indian Ocean Meet	Saint-Paul, Réunion	
800 m freestyle	9:34.58		Layne Lim Ah Tock	CAMO	30 December 2015	Indian Ocean Meet	Saint-Paul, Réunion	
1500 m freestyle								
50 m backstroke	29.49		Anishta Teeluck	Acqua13 ssd	4 November 2023	Swimmicup - Sprint Edition	Milan, Italy	
100 m backstroke	1:02.46		Anishta Teeluck	Acqua13 ssd	5 November 2023	Swimmicup - Sprint Edition	Milan, Italy	
200 m backstroke	2:13.71	h	Anishta Teeluck	Mauritius	18 December 2022	World Championships	Melbourne, Australia	
50m breaststroke	32.31		Alicia Kok Shun	Stipendium Hungaricum	9 November 2024	Hungarian Championships	Kaposvár, Hungary	
100m breaststroke	1:13.18	h	Alicia Kok Shun	Mauritius	19 December 2021	World Championships	Abu Dhabi, United Arab Emirates	
200m breaststroke	2:41.78	h	Alicia Kok Shun	Stipendium Hungaricum	8 November 2024	Hungarian Championships	Kaposvár, Hungary	
50m butterfly	28.56		Elodie Poo-cheong	CAMO	30 December 2013	Indian Ocean Meet	Saint-Paul, Réunion	
100m butterfly	1:02.08	h	Elodie Poo-cheong	Mauritius	15 December 2018	World Championships	Hangzhou, China	
200m butterfly	2:32.48	h	Elodie Poo-cheong	CAMO	29 December 2013	Indian Ocean Meet	Saint-Paul, Réunion	
100m individual medley	1:09.57		Varuna Jasodanand	CNQB	29 December 2015	Indian Ocean Meet	Saint-Paul, Réunion	
200m individual medley	2:24.01		Elodie Poo-cheong	Mauritius	30 December 2012	Indian Ocean Meet	Saint-Paul, Réunion	
400m individual medley	5:10.77	h	Elodie Poo-cheong	Mauritius	15 December 2010	World Championships	Dubai, United Arab Emirates	
4×50m freestyle relay	1:54.83		Annah Auckburaullee; Sonia Jayram; Sherrilynn Tse Chi Shum; Varuna Jasodanand	CNQB	28 December 2015	Indian Ocean Meet	Saint-Paul, Réunion	
4×100m freestyle relay	4:58.21		Sonia Jayram (1:06.59); Celia Glover (1:17.47); Varuna Jasodanand (1:09.53); Sandya Carpen (1:24.62)	CNQB	28 December 2014	Indian Ocean Meet	Saint-Paul, Réunion	
4×200m freestyle relay								
4×50m medley relay	2:06.49		Varuna Jasodanand (30.92); Annah Auckburaullee (36.50); Sherrilynn Tse Chi Shum (30.25); Sonia Jayram (28.82)	CNQB	29 December 2015	Indian Ocean Meet	Saint-Paul, Réunion	
4×100m medley relay								

Legend: # – Record awaiting ratification by Federation Mauricienne De Natation; WR – World record; AF – African record;
Records not set in finals: h – heat; sf – semifinal; r – relay 1st leg; rh – relay heat 1st leg; b – B final; † – en route to final mark; so – swim-off; tt – time trial

=== Mixed relay ===
Event	Time		Name	Club	Date	Meet	Location	Ref
4×50 m freestyle relay	1:39.78	h	Bradley Vincent (22.01); Mathieu Marquet (23.81); Elodie Poo-cheong (26.70); Camille Koenig (27.26)	Mauritius	12 December 2018	World Championships	Hangzhou, China	
4×50 m medley relay	1:52.89	h	Bradley Vincent (26.02); Elodie Poo-cheong (33.55); Mathieu Marquet (25.74); Camille Koenig (27.58)	Mauritius	13 December 2018	World Championships	Hangzhou, China	

Legend: # – Record awaiting ratification by Federation Mauricienne De Natation; WR – World record; AF – African record;
Records not set in finals: h – heat; so – swim-off
