= Madagascar at the 2017 World Aquatics Championships =

- Flag of Madagascar
- World Aquatics code: MAD
- National federation: Federation Malgache de Natation

in Budapest, Hungary
- Competitors: 4 in 1 sport
- Medals: Gold 0 Silver 0 Bronze 0 Total 0

World Aquatics Championships appearances
- 1973; 1975; 1978; 1982; 1986; 1991; 1994; 1998; 2001; 2003; 2005; 2007; 2009; 2011; 2013; 2015; 2017; 2019; 2022; 2023; 2024; 2025

Madagascar competed at the 2017 World Aquatics Championships in Budapest, Hungary from 14 July to 30 July.

== Swimming ==
Madagascar has received a Universality invitation from FINA to send a maximum of four swimmers (two men and two women) to the World Championships.

Athlete	Event	Heat		Semifinal		Final	
Athlete	Event	Time	Rank	Time	Rank	Time	Rank
Lalanomena Andrianirina	Men's 200 m backstroke	2:21.04	40	did not advance			
Lalanomena Andrianirina	Men's 200 m individual medley	2:23.97	44	did not advance			
Heriniavo Rasolonjatovo	Men's 100 m freestyle	54.70	83	did not advance			
Heriniavo Rasolonjatovo	Men's 200 m freestyle	2:01.00	67	did not advance			
Hantan Raharvel	Women's 50 m freestyle	28.84	65	did not advance			
Hantan Raharvel	Women's 50 m butterfly	30.89	49	did not advance			
Elodie Razafy	Women's 50 m backstroke	31.26	52	did not advance			
Elodie Razafy	Women's 100 m backstroke	1:07.49	48	did not advance			
Lalanomena Andrianirina; Heriniavo Rasolonjatovo; Hantan Raharvel; Elodie Razafy	Mixed 4 × 100 m freestyle relay	3:59.39	19	—N/a		did not advance	
