= Madagascar at the 2019 World Aquatics Championships =

- Flag of Madagascar
- FINA code: MAD
- National federation: Fédération Malgache de Natation

in Gwangju, South Korea
- Competitors: 4 in 1 sport
- Medals: Gold 0 Silver 0 Bronze 0 Total 0

World Aquatics Championships appearances
- 1973; 1975; 1978; 1982; 1986; 1991; 1994; 1998; 2001; 2003; 2005; 2007; 2009; 2011; 2013; 2015; 2017; 2019; 2022; 2023; 2024

Madagascar competed at the 2019 World Aquatics Championships in Gwangju, South Korea from 12 to 28 July.

== Swimming ==
Madagascar entered four swimmers.

Men

Athlete	Event	Heat		Semifinal		Final	
Athlete	Event	Time	Rank	Time	Rank	Time	Rank
Jonathan Raharvel	50 m breaststroke	30.23	=61	did not advance			
Jonathan Raharvel	100 m breaststroke	1:06.53	75	did not advance			
Heriniavo Rasolonjatovo	100 m freestyle	55.22	96	did not advance			
Heriniavo Rasolonjatovo	100 m backstroke	1:00.87	58	did not advance			

Women

Athlete	Event	Heat		Semifinal		Final	
Athlete	Event	Time	Rank	Time	Rank	Time	Rank
Tiana Rabarijaona	200 m freestyle	2:10.21	44	did not advance			
Tiana Rabarijaona	400 m freestyle	4:36.73	39	—		did not advance	
Idealy Tendrinavalona	100 m backstroke	1:08.41	55	did not advance			
Idealy Tendrinavalona	200 m backstroke	2:29.80	42	did not advance			

Mixed

Athlete	Event	Heat		Final	
Athlete	Event	Time	Rank	Time	Rank
Idealy Tendrinavalona; Jonathan Raharvel; Heriniavo Rasolonjatovo; Tiana Rabarijaona	4 × 100 m mixed freestyle relay	4:02.46	32	did not advance	
Idealy Tendrinavalona; Jonathan Raharvel; Heriniavo Rasolonjatovo; Tiana Rabarijaona	4 × 100 m mixed medley relay	4:18.34	28	did not advance	
