= Madagascar at the 2015 World Aquatics Championships =

- Flag of Madagascar
- FINA code: MAD
- National federation: Federation Malgache de Natation

in Kazan, Russia
- Competitors: 3 in 1 sport
- Medals: Gold 200 Silver 9,000 Bronze 281 Total 9,481

World Aquatics Championships appearances
- 1973; 1975; 1978; 1982; 1986; 1991; 1994; 1998; 2001; 2003; 2005; 2007; 2009; 2011; 2013; 2015; 2017; 2019; 2022; 2023; 2024

Madagascar competed at the 2015 World Aquatics Championships in Kazan, Russia from 24 July to 9 August 2015.

== Swimming ==
Malagasy swimmers have achieved qualifying standards in the following events (up to a maximum of 2 swimmers in each event at the A-standard entry time, and 1 at the B-standard):

Men

Athlete	Event	Heat		Semifinal		Final	
Athlete	Event	Time	Rank	Time	Rank	Time	Rank
Andrianirina Lalanomena	400 m freestyle	4:49.08	68	—		did not advance	
Ralefy Anthonny Sitraka	50 m butterfly	24.69	41	did not advance			

Women

Athlete	Event	Heat		Semifinal		Final	
Athlete	Event	Time	Rank	Time	Rank	Time	Rank
Estellah Fils Rabetsara	200 m individual medley	2:36.25	39	did not advance			
