= Madagascar at the 2023 World Aquatics Championships =

- Flag of Madagascar
- FINA code: MAD
- National federation: Fédération Malgache de Natation

in Fukuoka, Japan
- Competitors: 2 in 1 sport
- Medals: Gold 0 Silver 0 Bronze 0 Total 0

World Aquatics Championships appearances
- 1973; 1975; 1978; 1982; 1986; 1991; 1994; 1998; 2001; 2003; 2005; 2007; 2009; 2011; 2013; 2015; 2017; 2019; 2022; 2023; 2024

Madagascar is set to compete at the 2023 World Aquatics Championships in Fukuoka, Japan from 14 to 30 July.

== Swimming ==
Madagascar entered 2 swimmers.

Men

| Athlete | Event | Heat | | Semifinal | | Final | |
| Athlete | Event | Time | Rank | Time | Rank | Time | Rank |
|---|---|---|---|---|---|---|---|
| Jonathan Raharvel | 100 metre freestyle | 57.64 | 104 | Did not advance | | | |
| Jonathan Raharvel | 100 metre breaststroke | 1:04.39 | 53 | Did not advance | | | |

Women

| Athlete | Event | Heat | | Semifinal | | Final | |
| Athlete | Event | Time | Rank | Time | Rank | Time | Rank |
|---|---|---|---|---|---|---|---|
| Idealy Tendrinavalona | 50 metre backstroke | 32.41 | 51 | Did not advance | | | |
| Idealy Tendrinavalona | 100 metre backstroke | 1:10.29 | 56 | Did not advance | | | |
