= 2018 African Swimming Championships – Men's 100 metre backstroke =

Men's 100 metre backstroke at the 2018 African Swimming Championships
- Venue: Mohamed Boudiaf Olympic Complex
- Dates: 14 September (heats and final)
- Competitors: 15 from 12 nations
- Winning time: 55.49

Medalists
gold medal	Mohamed Samy	Egypt
silver medal	Jacques van Wyk	South Africa
bronze medal	Ali Khalafalla	Egypt

The Men's 100 metre backstroke competition of the 2018 African Swimming Championships was held on 14 September 2018.

== Records ==
Prior to the competition, the existing world and championship records were as follows.

	Name	Nation	Time	Location	Date
World record	Ryan Murphy	United States	51.85	Rio de Janeiro	13 August 2016
African record	Christopher Reid	South Africa	53.12	Durban	11 April 2016
Championship record	Darren Murray	South Africa	55.67	Casablanca	17 September 2010

The following new records were set during this competition.

Date	Event	Name	Nationality	Time	Record
14 September	Final	Mohamed Samy	Egypt	55.49	CR

== Results ==
=== Heats ===
The heats were started on 14 September at 09:50.

Rank	Name	Nationality	Time	Notes
1	Mohamed Samy	Egypt	57.66	Q
2	Ali Khalafalla	Egypt	57.78	Q
3	Jacques van Wyk	South Africa	58.01	Q
4	Driss Lahrichi	Morocco	58.34	Q
5	Mehdi Nazim Benbara	Algeria	58.50	Q
6	Abdellah Ardjoune	Algeria	59.08	Q
7	Bradley Vincent	Mauritius	59.10	Q
8	Kobe Ndebele	South Africa	1:00.77	Q
9	Alvin Omondi	Kenya	1:04.01	
10	Daniel Francisco	Angola	1:05.79	
11	Adnan Kabuye	Uganda	1:06.77	
12	Maemo Sebikiri	Botswana	1:16.31	
	Heriniavo Rasolonjatovo	Madagascar	Did not start	
	Sadiq Yahaya	Nigeria	Did not start	
	Mohamed Aziz Ghaffari	Tunisia	Did not start	

=== Final ===
The final was started on 14 September.

Rank	Lane	Name	Nationality	Time	Notes
1st place, gold medalist(s)	4	Mohamed Samy	Egypt	55.49	CR
2nd place, silver medalist(s)	3	Jacques van Wyk	South Africa	55.54	
3rd place, bronze medalist(s)	5	Ali Khalafalla	Egypt	56.70	
4	7	Abdellah Ardjoune	Algeria	57.27	
5	6	Driss Lahrichi	Morocco	57.99	
6	2	Mehdi Nazim Benbara	Algeria	58.44	
7	1	Bradley Vincent	Mauritius	58.78	
8	8	Kobe Ndebele	South Africa	1:01.38	
