= Madagascar at the 2024 World Aquatics Championships =

- Flag of Madagascar
- FINA code: MAD
- National federation: Fédération Malgache de Natation

in Doha, Qatar
- Competitors: 2 in 1 sport
- Medals: Gold 0 Silver 0 Bronze 0 Total 0

World Aquatics Championships appearances
- 1973; 1975; 1978; 1982; 1986; 1991; 1994; 1998; 2001; 2003; 2005; 2007; 2009; 2011; 2013; 2015; 2017; 2019; 2022; 2023; 2024

Madagascar competed at the 2024 World Aquatics Championships in Doha, Qatar from 2 to 18 February.

== Competitors ==
The following is the list of competitors in the Championships.

Sport	Men	Women	Total
Swimming	1	1	2
Total	1	1	2

== Swimming ==
Madagascar entered 2 swimmers.

Men

Athlete	Event	Heat		Semifinal		Final	
Athlete	Event	Time	Rank	Time	Rank	Time	Rank
Jonathan Raharvel	50 metre breaststroke	29.02	42	Did not advance			
Jonathan Raharvel	100 metre breaststroke	1:05.08	59	Did not advance			

Women

Athlete	Event	Heat		Semifinal		Final	
Athlete	Event	Time	Rank	Time	Rank	Time	Rank
Idealy Tendrinavalona	50 metre backstroke	32.44	50	Did not advance			
Idealy Tendrinavalona	100 metre backstroke	1:09.14	47	Did not advance			
