= Mauritius at the 2017 World Aquatics Championships =

- Flag of Mauritius
- FINA code: MRI
- National federation: Mauritius Swimming Federation

in Budapest, Hungary
- Competitors: 3 in 1 sport
- Medals: Gold 0 Silver 0 Bronze 0 Total 0

World Aquatics Championships appearances
- 1973; 1975; 1978; 1982; 1986; 1991; 1994; 1998; 2001; 2003; 2005; 2007; 2009; 2011; 2013; 2015; 2017; 2019; 2022; 2023; 2024

Mauritius competed at the 2017 World Aquatics Championships in Budapest, Hungary from 14 July to 30 July.

== Swimming ==
Mauritius has received a Universality invitation from FINA to send three swimmers (two men and one woman) to the World Championships.

Athlete	Event	Heat		Semifinal		Final	
Athlete	Event	Time	Rank	Time	Rank	Time	Rank
Mathieu Marquet	Men's 200 m freestyle	1:53.18 NR	57	did not advance			
Mathieu Marquet	Men's 400 m freestyle	4:07.28	48	—		did not advance	
Bradley Vincent	Men's 50 m freestyle	22.82 NR	43	did not advance			
Bradley Vincent	Men's 100 m freestyle	50.38	54	did not advance			
Elodie Poo-Cheong	Women's 100 m freestyle	58.76	46	did not advance			
Elodie Poo-Cheong	Women's 100 m butterfly	1:03.68	38	did not advance			
