= Mauritius at the 2023 World Aquatics Championships =

- Flag of Mauritius
- FINA code: MRI
- National federation: Fédération Mauricienne de Natation

in Fukuoka, Japan
- Competitors: 3 in 1 sport
- Medals: Gold 0 Silver 0 Bronze 0 Total 0

World Aquatics Championships appearances
- 1973; 1975; 1978; 1982; 1986; 1991; 1994; 1998; 2001; 2003; 2005; 2007; 2009; 2011; 2013; 2015; 2017; 2019; 2022; 2023; 2024

Mauritius is set to compete at the 2023 World Aquatics Championships in Fukuoka, Japan from 14 to 30 July.

== Swimming ==
Mauritius entered 3 swimmers.

Men

Athlete	Event	Heat		Semifinal		Final	
Athlete	Event	Time	Rank	Time	Rank	Time	Rank
Jonathan Chung Yee	100 metre breaststroke	1:06.05	60	Did not advance			
Jonathan Chung Yee	200 metre breaststroke	2:23.21	40	Did not advance			
Timothy Leberl	400 metre freestyle	4:09.47	48	—		Did not advance	
Timothy Leberl	1500 metre freestyle	16:27.67	28	—		Did not advance	

Women

Athlete	Event	Heat		Semifinal		Final	
Athlete	Event	Time	Rank	Time	Rank	Time	Rank
Anishta Teeluck	100 metre backstroke	1:05.32	49	Did not advance			
Anishta Teeluck	200 metre backstroke	2:18.63 NR	30	Did not advance			
