= 2018 African Swimming Championships – Men's 50 metre backstroke =

Men's 50 metre backstroke at the 2018 African Swimming Championships
- Venue: Mohamed Boudiaf Olympic Complex
- Dates: 10 September (heats and final)
- Competitors: 19 from 14 nations
- Winning time: 25.49

Medalists
gold medal	Mohamed Samy	Egypt
silver medal	Jacques van Wyk	South Africa
bronze medal	Abdellah Ardjoune	Algeria

The Men's 50 metre backstroke competition of the 2018 African Swimming Championships was held on 10 September 2018.

== Records ==
Prior to the competition, the existing world and championship records were as follows.

	Name	Nation	Time	Location	Date
World record	Kliment Kolesnikov	Russia	24.00	Glasgow	4 August 2018
African record	Gerhard Zandberg	South Africa	24.34	Rome	2 August 2009
Championship record	Ahmed Hussein	Egypt	26.00	Cairo	12 August 2002

The following new records were set during this competition.

Date	Event	Name	Nationality	Time	Record
10 September	Final	Mohamed Samy	Egypt	25.49	CR

== Results ==
=== Heats ===
The heats were started on 10 September at 10:25.

Rank	Name	Nationality	Time	Notes
1	Jacques van Wyk	South Africa	26.12	Q
2	Mohamed Samy	Egypt	26.23	Q
3	Abdellah Ardjoune	Algeria	26.77	Q
4	Ali Khalafalla	Egypt	26.81	Q
5	Mehdi Nazim Benbara	Algeria	26.83	Q
6	Bradley Vincent	Mauritius	27.00	Q
7	Driss Lahrichi	Morocco	27.55	Q
8	Mohamed Aziz Ghaffari	Tunisia	28.12	Q
9	Kobe Ndebele	South Africa	28.35	
10	Daniel Francisco	Angola	29.43	
11	Alvin Omondi	Kenya	29.77	
12	Adama Ndir	Senegal	29.92	
13	Mohammed Yousuf Bin Mousa	Libya	30.20	
14	Swaleh Talib	Kenya	30.22	
15	Adnan Kabuye	Uganda	30.89	
16	Maemo Sebikiri	Botswana	33.04	
	Heriniavo Rasolonjatovo	Madagascar	Did not start	
	Onyemeehi Opute	Nigeria	Did not start	
	Sadiq Yahaya	Nigeria	Did not start	

=== Final ===
The final was started on 10 September.

Rank	Lane	Name	Nationality	Time	Notes
1st place, gold medalist(s)	5	Mohamed Samy	Egypt	25.49	CR
2nd place, silver medalist(s)	4	Jacques van Wyk	South Africa	25.90	
3rd place, bronze medalist(s)	3	Abdellah Ardjoune	Algeria	26.54	
4	6	Ali Khalafalla	Egypt	26.89	
5	2	Mehdi Nazim Benbara	Algeria	26.96	
6	1	Driss Lahrichi	Morocco	27.05	
7	7	Bradley Vincent	Mauritius	27.24	
8	8	Mohamed Aziz Ghaffari	Tunisia	27.51	
