= Mauritius at the 2011 World Aquatics Championships =

- Flag of Mauritius
- FINA code: MRI
- National federation: Mauritius Swimming Federation

in Shanghai, China
- Competitors: 3 in 1 sports
- Medals: Gold 0 Silver 0 Bronze 0 Total 0

World Aquatics Championships appearances
- 1973; 1975; 1978; 1982; 1986; 1991; 1994; 1998; 2001; 2003; 2005; 2007; 2009; 2011; 2013; 2015; 2017; 2019; 2022; 2023; 2024

Mauritius competed at the 2011 World Aquatics Championships in Shanghai, China between July 16 and 31, 2011.

== Swimming ==
Mauritius qualified three swimmers.

Men

Athlete	Event	Heats		Semifinals		Final	
Athlete	Event	Time	Rank	Time	Rank	Time	Rank
Mathieu Marquet	Men's 200m Freestyle	2:02.41	57	did not advance			

Women

Athlete	Event	Heats		Semifinals		Final	
Athlete	Event	Time	Rank	Time	Rank	Time	Rank
Heather Arseth	Women's 200m Freestyle	2:10.93	43	did not advance			
Olivia de Maroussem	Women's 200m Freestyle	2:12.28	44	did not advance			
