= 2018 African Swimming Championships – Men's 200 metre backstroke =

Men's 200 metre backstroke at the 2018 African Swimming Championships
- Venue: Mohamed Boudiaf Olympic Complex
- Dates: 12 September (heats and final)
- Competitors: 11 from 8 nations
- Winning time: 2:05.13

Medalists
gold medal	Mohamed Ryad Bouhamidi	Algeria
silver medal	Jacques van Wyk	South Africa
bronze medal	Mohamed Samy	Egypt

The Men's 200 metre backstroke competition of the 2018 African Swimming Championships was held on 12 September 2018.

== Records ==
Prior to the competition, the existing world and championship records were as follows.

	Name	Nation	Time	Location	Date
World record	Aaron Peirsol	United States	1:51.92	Rome	31 July 2009
African record	George du Rand	South Africa	1:55.75	Rome	30 July 2009
Championship record	George du Rand	South Africa	2:01.02	Johannesburg	3 December 2008

== Results ==
=== Heats ===
The heats were started on 12 September at 10:10.

Rank	Name	Nationality	Time	Notes
1	Mohamed Ryad Bouhamidi	Algeria	2:05.56	Q
2	Jacques van Wyk	South Africa	2:07.32	Q
3	Abdellah Ardjoune	Algeria	2:08.47	Q
4	Driss Lahrichi	Morocco	2:10.45	Q
5	Mohamed Samy	Egypt	2:10.72	Q
6	Ahmed Hamdy	Egypt	2:11.95	Q
7	Mathieu Marquet	Mauritius	2:13.06	Q
8	Ruan Breytenbach	South Africa	2:15.13	Q
9	Alvin Omondi	Kenya	2:26.16	
	Heriniavo Rasolonjatovo	Madagascar	Did not start	
	Mohamed Aziz Ghaffari	Tunisia	Did not start	

=== Final ===
The final was started on 14 September.

Rank	Lane	Name	Nationality	Time	Notes
1st place, gold medalist(s)	4	Mohamed Ryad Bouhamidi	Algeria	2:05.13	
2nd place, silver medalist(s)	5	Jacques van Wyk	South Africa	2:05.76	
3rd place, bronze medalist(s)	2	Mohamed Samy	Egypt	2:06.88	
4	7	Ahmed Hamdy	Egypt	2:07.42	
5	3	Abdellah Ardjoune	Algeria	2:07.56	
6	6	Driss Lahrichi	Morocco	2:09.11	
7	1	Mathieu Marquet	Mauritius	2:14.83	
8	8	Ruan Breytenbach	South Africa	2:18.49	
