= Mauritius at the 2022 World Aquatics Championships =

- Flag of Mauritius
- FINA code: MRI
- National federation: Fédération Mauricienne de Natation

in Budapest, Hungary
- Competitors: 3 in 1 sport
- Medals: Gold 0 Silver 0 Bronze 0 Total 0

World Aquatics Championships appearances
- 1973; 1975; 1978; 1982; 1986; 1991; 1994; 1998; 2001; 2003; 2005; 2007; 2009; 2011; 2013; 2015; 2017; 2019; 2022; 2023; 2024

Mauritius competed at the 2022 World Aquatics Championships in Budapest, Hungary from 18 June to 3 July.

== Swimming ==
Mauritian swimmers have achieved qualifying standards in the following events.

| Athlete | Event | Heat | | Semifinal | | Final | |
| Athlete | Event | Time | Rank | Time | Rank | Time | Rank |
|---|---|---|---|---|---|---|---|
| Gregory Anodin | Men's 50 m freestyle | 24.38 | 63 | did not advance | | | |
| Gregory Anodin | Men's 100 m freestyle | 53.68 | 73 | did not advance | | | |
| Jonathan Chung Yee | Men's 100 m breaststroke | 1:06.04 | 54 | did not advance | | | |
| Jonathan Chung Yee | Men's 200 m breaststroke | 2:24.36 | 37 | did not advance | | | |
| Tessa Ip Hen Cheung | Women's 50 m breaststroke | 35.04 | 46 | did not advance | | | |
| Tessa Ip Hen Cheung | Women's 100 m breaststroke | 1:14.83 | 43 | did not advance | | | |
