= Mauritius at the 2024 World Aquatics Championships =

- Flag of Mauritius
- FINA code: MRI
- National federation: Fédération Mauricienne de Natation

in Doha, Qatar
- Competitors: 4 in 1 sport
- Medals: Gold 0 Silver 0 Bronze 0 Total 0

World Aquatics Championships appearances
- 1973; 1975; 1978; 1982; 1986; 1991; 1994; 1998; 2001; 2003; 2005; 2007; 2009; 2011; 2013; 2015; 2017; 2019; 2022; 2023; 2024

Mauritius competed at the 2024 World Aquatics Championships in Doha, Qatar from 2 to 18 February.

== Competitors ==
The following is the list of competitors in the Championships.

| Sport | Men | Women | Total |
|---|---|---|---|
| Swimming | 2 | 2 | 4 |
| Total | 2 | 2 | 4 |

== Swimming ==
Mauritius entered 4 swimmers.

Men

| Athlete | Event | Heat | | Semifinal | | Final | |
| Athlete | Event | Time | Rank | Time | Rank | Time | Rank |
|---|---|---|---|---|---|---|---|
| Jonathan Chung | 100 metre breaststroke | 1:06.31 | 61 | Did not advance | | | |
| Jonathan Chung | 200 metre breaststroke | 2:26.00 | 33 | Did not advance | | | |
| Ovesh Purahoo | 50 metre freestyle | 24.35 | 71 | Did not advance | | | |
| Ovesh Purahoo | 100 metre freestyle | 52.55 | 69 | Did not advance | | | |

Women

| Athlete | Event | Heat | | Semifinal | | Final | |
| Athlete | Event | Time | Rank | Time | Rank | Time | Rank |
|---|---|---|---|---|---|---|---|
| Tessa Ip Hen Cheung | 100 metre freestyle | 1:01.60 | 53 | Did not advance | | | |
| Tessa Ip Hen Cheung | 100 metre breaststroke | 1:14.25 | 41 | Did not advance | | | |
| Alicia Kok Shun | 50 metre freestyle | 27.04 | 55 | Did not advance | | | |
| Alicia Kok Shun | 50 metre breaststroke | 33.19 | 33 | Did not advance | | | |
