= Mauritius at the 2019 World Aquatics Championships =

- Flag of Mauritius
- FINA code: MRI
- National federation: Fédération Mauricienne de Natation

in Gwangju, South Korea
- Competitors: 4 in 1 sport
- Medals: Gold 0 Silver 0 Bronze 0 Total 0

World Aquatics Championships appearances
- 1973; 1975; 1978; 1982; 1986; 1991; 1994; 1998; 2001; 2003; 2005; 2007; 2009; 2011; 2013; 2015; 2017; 2019; 2022; 2023; 2024

Mauritius competed at the 2019 World Aquatics Championships in Gwangju, South Korea from 12 to 28 July.

== Swimming ==
Mauritius entered four swimmers.

Men

Athlete	Event	Heat		Semifinal		Final	
Athlete	Event	Time	Rank	Time	Rank	Time	Rank
Mathieu Marquet	100 m butterfly	1:00.03	70	did not advance			
Bradley Vincent	50 m freestyle	23.23	57	did not advance			
Bradley Vincent	50 m backstroke	27.97	57	did not advance			

Women

Athlete	Event	Heat		Semifinal		Final	
Athlete	Event	Time	Rank	Time	Rank	Time	Rank
Camille Koenig	50 m freestyle	29.14	73	did not advance			
Camille Koenig	200 m backstroke	2:28.32	41	did not advance			
Elodie Poo-Cheong	50 m breaststroke	36.72	45	did not advance			
Elodie Poo-Cheong	50 m butterfly	30.26	48	did not advance			
