= 2018 African Swimming Championships – Men's 200 metre butterfly =

Men's 200 metre butterfly at the 2018 African Swimming Championships
- Venue: Mohamed Boudiaf Olympic Complex
- Dates: 14 September (heats and final)
- Competitors: 12 from 9 nations
- Winning time: 2:00.96

Medalists
gold medal	Marwan Elkamash	Egypt
silver medal	Ruan Breytenbach	South Africa
bronze medal	Said Saber	Morocco

The Men's 200 metre butterfly competition of the 2018 African Swimming Championships was held on 14 September 2018.

== Records ==
Prior to the competition, the existing world and championship records were as follows.

	Name	Nation	Time	Location	Date
World record	Michael Phelps	United States	1:51.51	Rome	29 July 2009
African record	Chad le Clos	South Africa	1:52.96	London	31 July 2012
Championship record	Wesley Gilchrist	South Africa	2:00.72	Casablanca	18 September 2010

== Results ==
=== Heats ===
The heats were started on 14 September at 09:30. The first 8 finishers would qualify for the final.

Rank	Name	Nationality	Time	Notes
1	Ruan Breytenbach	South Africa	2:03.37	Q
2	Marwan Elkamash	Egypt	2:05.56	Q
3	Said Saber	Morocco	2:05.80	Q
4	Ahmed Hamdy	Egypt	2:05.85	Q
5	Lounis Khendriche	Algeria	2:06.03	Q
6	Mohamed Malek Masmoudi	Tunisia	2:07.17	Q
7	Alaric Basson	South Africa	2:08.11	Q
8	Ramzi Chouchar	Algeria	2:08.48	Q
9	Mathieu Marquet	Mauritius	2:13.12	
10	Herinirina John Rakotomavo	Madagascar	2:15.88	
11	Edilson Paco	Mozambique	2:37.00	
	Onyemeehi Opute	Nigeria	Did not start	

=== Final ===
The final was started on 14 September.

Rank	Lane	Name	Nationality	Time	Notes
1st place, gold medalist(s)	5	Marwan Elkamash	Egypt	2:00.96	
2nd place, silver medalist(s)	4	Ruan Breytenbach	South Africa	2:01.20	
3rd place, bronze medalist(s)	3	Said Saber	Morocco	2:02.49	NR
4	6	Ahmed Hamdy	Egypt	2:02.79	
5	2	Lounis Khendriche	Algeria	2:02.98	
6	1	Alaric Basson	South Africa	2:05.60	
7	7	Mohamed Malek Masmoudi	Tunisia	2:05.95	
8	8	Ramzi Chouchar	Algeria	2:07.21	
