= Camille Koenig =

Mauritian swimmer

Personal information
- Born: 23 June 2001 (age 25)

Sport
- Sport: Swimming

Camille Koenig (born 23 June 2001) is a Mauritian swimmer.

In 2019, she represented Mauritius at the 2019 World Aquatics Championships held in Gwangju, South Korea. She competed in the women's 50 metre freestyle event. She did not advance to compete in the semi-finals. She also competed in the women's 200 metre backstroke event and in this event she also did not advance to the semi-finals. In 2019, she also represented Mauritius at the 2019 African Games held in Rabat, Morocco without winning a medal.
