= Jacques van Wyk =

South African cricketer (born 1978)

Personal information
- Born: 27 January 1978 (age 48); Stellenbosch, South Africa
- Source: Cricinfo, 1 December 2020

Jacques van Wyk (born 27 January 1978) is a South African former cricketer. He played in 23 first-class and 31 List A matches for Boland from 1998 to 2009.

== See also ==
- List of Boland representative cricketers
