= Heather Arseth =

American-Mauritian swimmer

Heather Ann Arseth
Personal information
- Full name: Heather Ann Arseth
- Nationality: United States
- Born: August 9, 1993 (age 33) New York, New York, U.S.
- Height: 5 ft 7 in (170 cm)
- Weight: 132 lb (60 kg)

Sport
- Sport: Swimming
- Strokes: Freestyle
- Club: Aquajets Swim Club; TSM Aquatics, Santa Monica
- College team: Miami Hurricanes; Iowa Hawkeyes
- Coach: Kate Lundsten, Aquajets; Marc Long, Iowa; Andy Kershaw, Miami

Achievements and titles
- Personal best: 2:07:81 2012 Olympics,

Heather Ann Arseth is an American-born swimmer who competed for the East African Island nation of Mauritius, near Madagascar, in the 2012 and 2016 Olympics. Heather's French-speaking mother was born in Mauritius and Heather maintained a dual nationality. In other International Competition, she competed in the 2011 China, 2013 Spain, and 2015 FINA World Aquatics Championships in Russia, as well as the 2015 African Games.

At the 2012 Summer Olympics Heather finished 34th overall in the preliminary heats in the Women's 200 metre freestyle, and also swam the 100 meter preliminary heats in the Women's 100 metre freestyle at the 2016 Summer Olympics in Rio de Janeiro in Brazil without advancing to the semi-final heat.

Heather was born to Paul and Caroline Arseth on August 9, 1993 in New York, New York, according to one source, Olympedia, though the family soon moved to Plymouth, Minnesota. Her mother was born in Mauritius, and her grandfather had competed for Mauritius in bodybuilding. She attended Wayzata High School, a Minnesota State Champion from 2013-15 with a large enrollment and in the summers swam and competed with the Aquajets Swim Club under coach Kate Lundsten in Eden Prairie, which allowed her to swim year round. In college, she swam for the University of Iowa as a Freshman and Sophomore, and then for the University of Miami.

== Wayzata High school swimming ==
Swimming at Wayzata High School, she was a four-time All-American and a Scholastic All-American in her Sophomore and Junior years. She held the Wayzata High School record in the 50 and 100 meter freestyle, and was a member of the 200 meter and 400 meter freestyle relays that won the Minnesota State Tournament. She also competed in track and field in high school and won a varsity letter.

== U. of Iowa swimming ==
Between 2011-12 as a Freshman at Iowa, at the Big Ten championships, she swam her personal college bests for the 50 m of 23.49 and in the 100 m of 51.32 free. At the Hawkeye Invitational, she swam her best college time for the 100 m back in 56.43. Also at the Big Ten Championships, she was a part of the 200 m free relay with her time of 1:31:68 that set a school record. As a Freshman letter winner, she swam on nine relays that placed first. She was coached by Marc Long, who had over six years as head coach and had coached swimmer's with a high level of academic success.

In her sophomore year at Iowa, she led her team in the 100 m back, and was second fastest on the team in the 50 m and 100m free. She was a member of a record setting 200 m relay with her own time of at 1:40:97, and 400 m relay with her own time of 3:42:52. She was in the Academic All Big Ten, and a Big Ten distinguished scholar, and was named to the University Dean's list in May 2014 with a 4.0 grade point average. She was a Sophomore letter winner as well.

== U. of Miami swimming ==
In her Junior Year at Miami (2013–14), she was chosen with seven other team representatives to compete in the SMU Classic on Oct. 18-19. While at the SMU Classic in Dallas, she competed in the 400 medley relay with a time of 3:48.63 and in the 50 free with a time of 23.53. Injury forced her to miss time midseason. On January 31, she finished first in the 100 backstroke with a time of 56.54 in a dual meet with Florida State. She took Biology courses, majoring in Neuroscience and attended labs as part of her education. At the University of Miami, an accomplished swimming school, she was coached by Andy Kershaw with over nine years as a Miami coach, having begun his tenure in 2013.

== International competition ==
=== 2011, China, FINA World Championships ===
On July 26, 2011, she competed in the 15th FINA World Championships in China, and received a 2:10.93 in the Women's 200 M freestyle, placing her 43rd.

== Olympics, 2012 London, 200 m free ==
As an American competing for the Island nation of Mauritius, off East Africa, she completed her 2012 Olympic 200 meter freestyle with a time of 2:07.81 at the London Aquatics Center on July 30, 2012, failing to make it to the semi-final round. The time, however, was a personal best, and required focus, effort, and training. Against some of the world's top competition, she swam in the first 200 m qualifying heat of five women and placed fourth in the heat finishing 34th overall.

=== 2013, Spain, FINA World Championships ===
On January 18, 2013, she competed in the 15th FINA World Championships in China, and received a 58.73 in the Women's 100 M freestyle, placing her 54th. On July 31, 2013, she received a 30.61 in the Women's 50 M backstroke, placing her 41st.

=== 2015 Russia, FINA World Championships, African Games ===
On March 8, 2015, she swam in the Women's 100 meter backstroke at the 15th FINA World Championships in Russia, with a time of 1:06:25, placing her 52nd in competition.

At the 11th African Games on July 9, 2015, she swam a personal best in the 50 m butterfly of 28.31 at the age of 22, and also swam the 100 m backstroke, the 50 m backstroke and the 100 m freestyle.

== Olympics, 2016 Rio, 100 m free ==
Around August 10–11, 2016, she swam the 100-meter freestyle at the Rio Olympics, in the outdoor Maria Lenk Aquatic Center, and finished 37th overall with a time of 58.89. Due to her time and position, she did not advance past her first heat or to the following semi-final round though she did compete against the world's best.

To maintain her conditioning, she swam for a period for TSM Aquatics in Santa Monica during the 2018-19 season.

== Professional life ==
According to an online profile, after 2016 Heather worked as a Swim coach at a quality gym in Plymouth, Minnesota and for several years as the Swim and Dive Coach at Wayzata High School in Minnesota, where she had previously graduated. She has also tutored Math and Science students for extra income. From her mother, who was born in Mauritius, and her mother's relatives, she had some French language ability.
