= Heriniavo Rasolonjatovo =

Malagasy swimmer

Personal information
- Nationality: Malagasy
- Born: 24 May 1998 (age 26)

Sport
- Sport: Swimming

Heriniavo Rasolonjatovo (born 24 May 1998) is a Malagasy swimmer. He competed in the men's 100 metre backstroke at the 2020 Summer Olympics.
