= Madagascar at the 2011 World Aquatics Championships =

Sporting event delegation

Flag of Madagascar

Madagascar competed at the 2011 World Aquatics Championships in Shanghai, China between July 16 and 31, 2011.

== Swimming ==
Madagascar qualified 3 swimmers.

Men

Athlete	Event	Heats		Semifinals		Final	
Athlete	Event	Time	Rank	Time	Rank	Time	Rank
Indra Rakotondrazanaka	Men's 50m Freestyle	25.72	69	did not advance			
Indra Rakotondrazanaka	Men's 100m Breaststroke	1:13.38	77	did not advance			
Mamitina Ramanantsoa	Men's 100m Breaststroke	1:11.96	76	did not advance			
Mamitina Ramanantsoa	Men's 200m Breaststroke	2:35.35	55	did not advance			

Women

Athlete	Event	Heats		Semifinals		Final	
Athlete	Event	Time	Rank	Time	Rank	Time	Rank
Estellah Fils Rabetsara	Women's 100m Freestyle	1:03.62	61	did not advance			
Estellah Fils Rabetsara	Women's 200m Backstroke	2:33.83	38	did not advance			
