= Flag of Madagascar =

Republic of Madagascar
- Use: National flag and ensign
- Proportion: 2:3
- Adopted: 21 October 1958; 68 years ago
- Design: Two equal horizontal bands of red and green with a vertical white band of the same size on the hoist side
- Designed by: Andrianome Ranaivosoa

The national flag of Madagascar is a tricolour featuring two equal horizontal bands of red and green with a vertical white band of the same size on the hoist side. It was designed by Andrianome Ranaivosoa, an agent of the Malagasy National Geographic Institute. The design was chosen by a technical commission on 15 October 1958 and officially adopted on 21 October, one day and one week after the Malagasy Republic was proclaimed, respectively.

== Design and symbolism ==
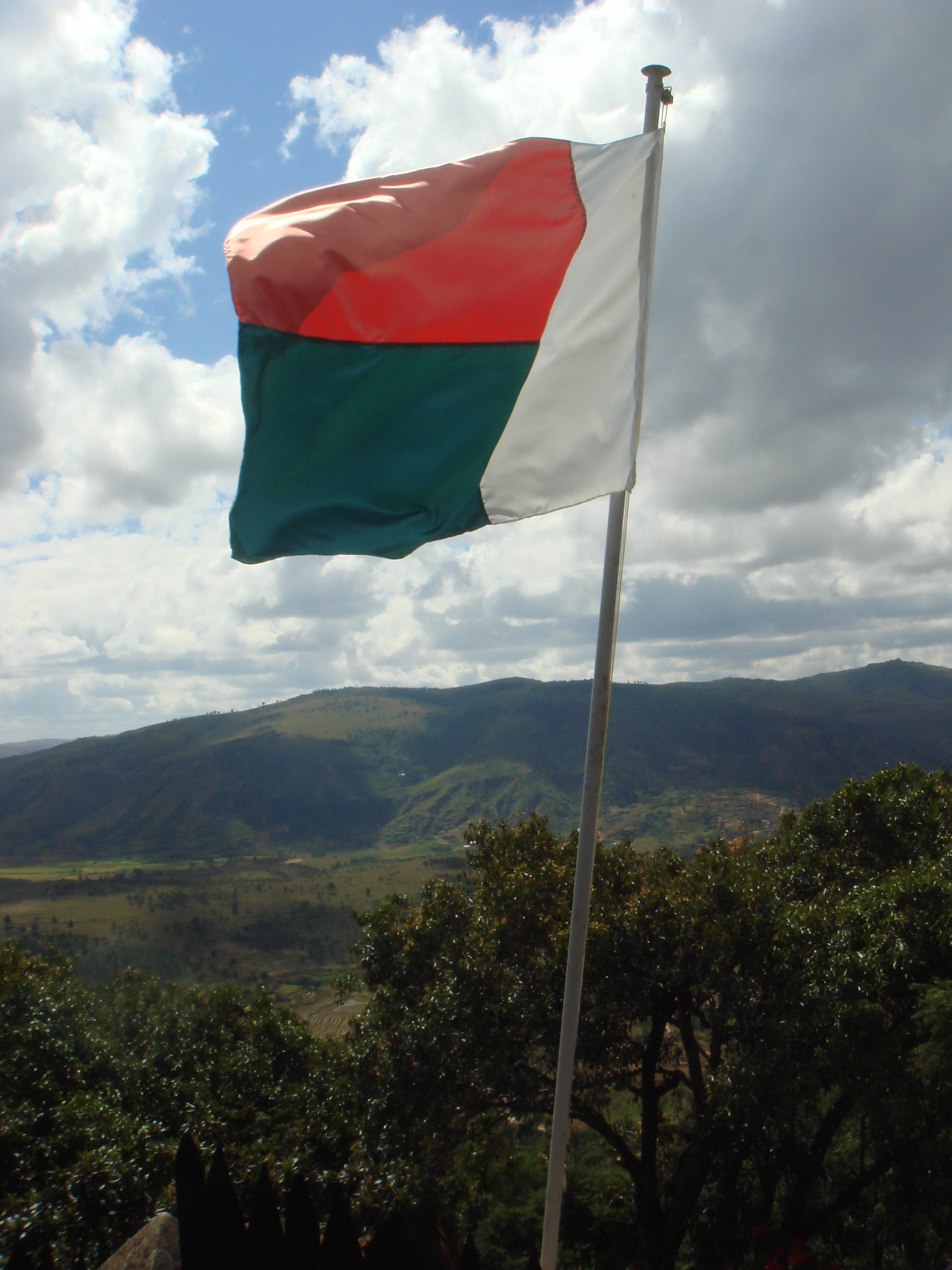
Reverse side of the flag

The design of the flag is described in Title I, Article 4 of the Constitution of Madagascar, 2010:

[Madagascar's] national emblem is the tricolour flag of white, red, and green, composed of three rectangular bands of equal dimensions: the first vertical of white on the side of the pole, the other two horizontal, the superior red and the inferior green.

The colours of the flag originally had no meaning. Upon the adoption of the flag on 21 October 1958, Barinia Tsara of the Bureau of the Constituent National Assembly gave the following significance to its colours: "White is purity; red is sovereignty. As for green, gentlemen, it is hope". The meanings of the colours have since changed, with more complex meanings being attributed to them. The office of the Malagasy president describes the present significance of the flag's colours as such: red represents national unity, green represents hope, and white represents freedom, security, and cleanliness. Additionally, the office connects the colours to different elements of Madagascar's geography and society. Red was a symbol of the country's historical monarchies and is the colour of the clay bricks used to construct most Malagasy houses. Nearly all of Madagascar is covered in lush greenery, such as the Ravenala of the coastal hinterlands and the forests of the central highlands. White is the colour of the clothing traditionally worn by Malagasy women and of rice, a staple food of the Malagasy.

== Creation and adoption ==
In 1958, the colonial broadcaster Radio Tananarive issued a call for designs for a national flag, in preparation for Madagascar's impending independence. A technical commission of Malagasy delegates from across the country was formed to select the final design. The commission met on 15 October, the day after the Malagasy Republic was proclaimed, to make the decision. The submissions were narrowed down to five proposals deemed most relevant to Madagascar, which were then presented by hostesses on a podium in front of the delegates. The second design by Andrianome Ranaivosoa, an agent of the Malagasy National Geographical Institute, was ultimately chosen by the delegates. According to Malagasy historian Tsiory Randriamanantena, the delegates believed that the design was aesthetically pleasing and that the colours would be easily recognisable and memorable for the Malagasy people. The national flag of Madagascar was officially adopted on 21 October, one week after the proclamation of the Malagasy Republic. It was raised for the first time on the same day, at a public ceremony held on Liberation Avenue (renamed Independence Avenue upon Madagascar's independence from France on 26 June 1960). Despite multiple changes in government and constitution, the national flag has remained unaltered since.

The flag initially received significant criticism for its choice of colours. Some critics argued that it could not be a symbol of national unity because it incorporated red and white, the royal colours of the Merina Kingdom, whose rulers came from the Merina ethnic majority. Meanwhile, the country's political opposition criticised the use of red and green, which were the colours of the Social Democratic Party of Madagascar, the ruling party at the time.

== Historical flags ==
Europeans were the first to plant flags in Madagascar, and the concept was adopted by the island's indigenous peoples after contact between the two. Portugal planted its flag in 1515, followed by the Netherlands in 1595 and France in 1602. In 1772, Count Maurice Benyovszky of Hungary arrived in Madagascar with 300 soldiers. He and his army fought against the Sakalava people, winning the support of the indigenous peoples of Antongil Bay, who proclaimed him their king. Benyovszky purportedly adopted as his standard blue flags charged with one or two white crescents, or a white crescent and two white stars.

Red and white have historically been the predominant flag colours in Madagascar. The Antalaotra ethnic group of northwest Madagascar reportedly flew a horizontal tricolour of red, white, and black. When trading out at sea with people from the Comoros and continental Africa, the Antalaotra displayed red, white or black ensigns with Arabic inscriptions. The Sakalava royal family, which ruled the western Kingdom of Menabé (Menabé meaning "great red"), was divided into two bloodlines: the Volaména, descendants of the first wife of Andrianisara represented by red; and the Volafotsi, descendants of other women represented by white. The flag of the Antankarana Kingdom was a white field charged with a red star and crescent, a reference to the Antankarana people's Islamic heritage. Andrianampoinimerina of Imerina had his son Radama accompanied by two standards whenever he travelled: a white one representing the idol Kelinalaza, and a red one representing the idols Manjakatsiroa and Fantaka. After succeeding his father in 1810, Radama had his kingdom adopt a white-and-red bicolour, a combination of his personal standards. From then on, it was regular practice for the rulers of Imerina to put their name and title in red lettering on a white or white-and-red flag.

Purported standard of Count Maurice Benyovszky

Flag of the Antalaotra

Flag of the Antankarana Kingdom

Flag of the Kingdom of Imerina

== See also ==
- List of Malagasy flags
- Seal of Madagascar
