= Flag of Mauritius =

Republic of Mauritius
- The Four Bands, Les Quatre Bandes
- Use: National flag
- Proportion: 2:3
- Adopted: March 12, 1968; 58 years ago
- Design: Four horizontal bands of red, blue, yellow and green.
- Designed by: Gurudutt Moher
- Use: Civil ensign
- Proportion: 1:2
- Design: A red field with the national flag in and the coat of arms in a white circle on the fly side.
- Use: State ensign
- Proportion: 1:2
- Design: A navy blue field with the national flag in the canton corner, with the coat of arms on the fly side of the flag.
- Use: Naval ensign
- Proportion: 26:57
- Design: A white field with a blue band on each side, followed by two red stripes with the middle red stripe being thinner, charged with an anchor with a gold five-pointed star above it.
- Use: Presidential standard
- Proportion: 2:3
- Design: The national flag with a white circle, within it the coat of arms, below it, a golden wreath and the letters RM.

The national flag of Mauritius, also known as The Four Bands (Les Quatre Bandes), was adopted upon independence, 12 March 1968. It consists of four horizontal bands of equal width, coloured (from top to bottom) red, blue, yellow, and green. The flag was recorded at the College of Arms in London on 9 January 1968.

The flag was designed by Gurudutt Moher whose contribution was recognised posthumously in March 2018 in the form of the national title Member of the Star and Key of the Indian Ocean (MSK). Moher, who was a retired school teacher, died of a heart attack on 7 October 2017, at the age of 93.

The civil ensign (for private vessels) and government ensign (for state vessels) are red and blue flags, respectively, each with the national flag in the canton and the coat of arms of Mauritius in the fly. They are based on the British Red and Blue Ensigns.

The naval ensign (used by coast guard vessels) is an unusual design consisting of red, white, and blue vertical stripes of unequal widths defaced by a central anchor/key emblem.

== Colours ==
Under current legislation through The National Flag, Arms of Mauritius, National Anthem and Other National Symbols of Mauritius Act (2022), it sets out the flag of Mauritius as consisting of red, blue, yellow and green bands.

It also indicates the symbolism behind the meaning of the colours of the flag:

- Red represents the struggle for freedom and independence.
- Blue represents the Indian Ocean, in which Mauritius is situated.
- Yellow represents the light of freedom shining over the island.
- Green represents the agriculture of Mauritius and its colour throughout the 12 months of the year.

In an attempt to unite the nation, especially following the deadly and divisive riots of 1965 and those of 1968, the colours also have political origins. Indeed, the colours also represent the main political parties which existed at the time, namely:

- Red: Parti Travailliste, a social-democrat party
- Blue: PMSD, conservative
- Yellow: IFB, socialist, Indo-Mauritian
- Green: CAM, Muslim Indo-Mauritians interests

The colour codes set for the four colours of the flag under law are dictated in Pantone fashion home cotton and that the tolerance for overlapping between 2 different colours be no more than one millimetre. The table below converts the Pantone colours in various other colour codes, corresponding to the official colours:

Colours	Red	Blue	Yellow	Green
Pantone	18-1664TC	19-3939TC	14-0957TC	17-6030TC
CMYK	0/87/85/19	49/43/0/65	0/26/90/3	100/0/34/47
RGB	208/28/31	45/51/89	247/183/24	0/134/88
Hexadecimal	#D01C1F	#2D3359	#F7B718	#008658

== Sizes ==
The official sizes of the flag are in accordance with The National Flag, Arms of Mauritius, National Anthem and Other National Symbols of Mauritius Act (2022). The flag size is in the ratio of 2:3.

Flag type	Width × Height (mm)	Colour band height (mm)
Mast	1800 × 1200	300
Desk/Handheld	150 × 100	25
Car	300 × 200	50

== Historical flags ==
Dutch Mauritius; Flag of the Dutch East India Company (1638–1710)

French Mauritius; Royal Standard of the King of France (1715–1792)

French Mauritius; Flag of France (1792–1810)

British Mauritius colonial flag (1810-1869)

British Mauritius colonial flag (1869-1906)

British Mauritius colonial flag (1906-1923)

British Mauritius colonial flag (1923-1968)

British Mauritius colonial civil ensign (1906-1968)

Flag of Mauritius 1989 Based on Flags Of World Poster 1989

== See also ==
- List of Mauritian flags
- Flag of Seychelles
- Flag of the Central African Republic
